= The Little Mermaid (franchise) =

Disney media franchise

- Created by: Walt Disney Animation Studios; John Musker; Ron Clements
- Original work: The Little Mermaid (1989)
- Owner: The Walt Disney Company
- Years: 1989–present
- Based on: The Little Mermaid by Hans Christian Andersen

Films and television
- Films: The Little Mermaid (1989); The Little Mermaid (2023)
- Animated series: The Little Mermaid (1992–1994); Ariel (2024–present)
- Television special: The Little Mermaid Live! (2019)
- Direct-to-video: The Little Mermaid II: Return to the Sea (2000); The Little Mermaid: Ariel's Beginning (2008)

Theatrical presentations
- Musicals: The Little Mermaid (2007); The Little Mermaid – A Musical Adventure (2025)

Games
- Video games: The Little Mermaid (1991); Ariel the Little Mermaid (1992); Ariel's Story Studio (1997); Disney's The Little Mermaid Print Studio (1998); Disney's The Little Mermaid 2 Activity Center (2000); The Little Mermaid 2: Pinball Frenzy (2000); The Little Mermaid Pinball (2005)

Audio
- Soundtracks: The Little Mermaid: Original Motion Picture Soundtrack (1989); The Little Mermaid: Splash Hits (1993); Songs from The Little Mermaid II: Return to the Sea & More! (2000); The Little Mermaid (2023)
- Original music: Sebastian from The Little Mermaid (1990); Sebastian: Party Gras! (1991); The Little Mermaid: Songs from the Sea (1992)

Miscellaneous
- Theme park attractions: Voyage of the Little Mermaid (1992–2020); Ariel's Grotto (1996–2020); Jumpin' Jellyfish (2001–present); King Triton's Carousel of the Sea (2001–2018); Mermaid Lagoon (2001–present); Scuttle's Scooters (2001–present); The Little Mermaid ~ Ariel's Undersea Adventure/Under the Sea ~ Journey of the Little Mermaid (2011–present)

The Little Mermaid is an American media franchise created by The Walt Disney Company based on "The Little Mermaid", written by Danish poet Hans Christian Andersen. The success of the 1989 animated film led to a sequel, a prequel, a television series, a musical, several video games, theme park attractions, and other merchandise. A live-action remake of the film was released in 2023. The Little Mermaid paved the way for what would become the Disney Renaissance, with the original film becoming the first film of that era. It is also one of the highest-grossing media franchises.

== Development ==
=== History ===
The Little Mermaid was originally planned as part of one of Walt Disney's earliest feature films, a proposed package film featuring vignettes of Hans Christian Andersen tales. Development started soon after Snow White and the Seven Dwarfs in the late 1930s, but was put on hold due to various circumstances.

In 1985, The Great Mouse Detective co-director Ron Clements discovered a collection of Andersen's fairy tales while browsing a bookstore. He presented a two-page draft of a movie based on "The Little Mermaid" to CEO Michael Eisner and Walt Disney Studios chairman Jeffrey Katzenberg at a "gong show" idea suggestion meeting. Eisner and Katzenberg passed the project over, because at that time the studio was in development on a sequel to their live-action mermaid comedy Splash (1984) and felt The Little Mermaid would be too similar a project. The next day, however, Walt Disney Studios chairman Katzenberg greenlit the idea for possible development. While in production in the 1980s, the staff found, by chance, original story and visual development work done by Kay Nielsen for Disney's proposed 1930s Anderson feature. Many of the changes made by the staff in the 1930s to Hans Christian Andersen's original story were coincidentally the same as the changes made by Disney writers in the 1980s. That year, Clements and Great Mouse Detective co-director John Musker expanded the two-page idea into a 20-page rough script, eliminating the role of the mermaid's grandmother and expanding the roles of the Merman King and the sea witch.

=== Music ===
In 1987, songwriter Howard Ashman became involved with the writing and development of Mermaid after he was asked to contribute a song to Oliver & Company. He proposed changing the minor character Clarence, the English-butler crab, to a Jamaican Rastafarian crab and shifting the music style throughout the film to reflect this. At the same time, Katzenberg, Clements, Musker, and Ashman revised the story format to make Mermaid a musical with a Broadway-style story structure, with the song sequences serving as the tentpoles of the film. Ashman and composer Alan Menken, both noted for their work as the writers of the successful Off-Broadway stage musical Little Shop of Horrors, teamed up to compose the entire song score.

The first film's soundtrack, The Little Mermaid: Original Motion Picture Soundtrack contains songs from the film written by Ashman and Menken, as well as the film's score composed by Menken. The album received the Academy Award for Best Original Score and the Golden Globe Award for Best Original Score. As of February 2007, the album is certified 6× Platinum by the RIAA. In 2010, Rhapsody called it one of the all-time great Disney soundtracks. To commemorate the film's 25th anniversary, an extended version of the soundtrack was released on November 24, 2014, as part of Walt Disney Records: The Legacy Collection.

Apart from the soundtrack, The Little Mermaid has inspired several more albums. Sebastian from The Little Mermaid and Sebastian: Party Gras! contain cover versions of calypso and reggae songs. All of the songs are performed by Samuel E. Wright as Sebastian the crab with the exception of "Dancing Mood" and "Dance the Day Away", which are performed by Jodi Benson as Ariel, who also joins Sebastian on "Day-O". Jason Marin plays the speaking role of Flounder in the beginning of some tracks. The Little Mermaid: Songs from the Sea is a concept album; listening to the tracks in order will present the story of a typical day in the life of the mermaid Ariel (set sometime before the events of the first film).

Disney's The Little Mermaid: Original Broadway Cast Recording is the cast album for the musical The Little Mermaid. It features performances from the show's cast, which includes Tituss Burgess, Sherie Rene Scott, Norm Lewis, Eddie Korbich, and newcomer Sierra Boggess as Ariel, the little mermaid.

== Common elements ==
=== Plot and themes ===
Ariel, a beautiful sixteen-year-old mermaid princess, is dissatisfied with life under the sea and curious about the human world, despite her father, King Triton who holds a grudge against humans. One night, Ariel, her best friend Flounder and an unwilling Sebastian travel to the ocean surface to watch a celebration for the birthday of Prince Eric, with whom Ariel falls in love. A sudden storm hits, and Eric almost drowns saving his dog Max but is saved by Ariel, who drags him to the beach. She sings to him but dives underwater when Max returns to Eric. Upon waking, Eric has a vague impression that he was rescued by a girl with a beautiful voice; he vows to find her, and Ariel vows to find a way to join Eric.

Triton and his daughters notice a change in Ariel, who is openly lovesick. Triton questions Sebastian about Ariel's behavior, during which Sebastian accidentally reveals the incident with Eric. Triton furiously confronts Ariel in her grotto, using his trident to destroy her collection of human treasures. After Triton leaves, a pair of eels, Flotsam and Jetsam, convince a crying Ariel that she must visit Ursula the sea witch, if she wants all of her dreams to come true. Ursula makes a deal with Ariel to transform her into a human for three days. Within these three days, Ariel must receive the 'kiss of true love' from Eric; otherwise, she will transform back into a mermaid on the third day and belong to Ursula. As payment for legs, Ariel has to give up her voice, which Ursula takes by magically removing the energy from Ariel's vocal cords and storing it in a nautilus shell.

Eric and Max find Ariel on the beach. He initially suspects that she is the one who saved his life, but when he learns that she cannot speak, he discards that notion. Nonetheless, Ariel spends time with Eric, and at the end of the second day, they almost kiss but are thwarted by Flotsam and Jetsam. Angered at their narrow escape, Ursula takes the disguise of a beautiful young woman named "Vanessa" and appears onshore singing with Ariel's voice. Eric recognizes the song and, in her disguise, Vanessa/Ursula casts a hypnotic enchantment on Eric to make him forget about Ariel. The next day, Ariel finds out that Eric will be married to the disguised Ursula on a ship. She cries and is left behind when the wedding barge departs. Scuttle discovers that Vanessa is Ursula in disguise, and informs Ariel. As Ariel and Flounder chase the wedding barge, Sebastian informs Triton, and Scuttle is assigned to literally "stall the wedding." With the help of various animals, the nautilus shell around Ursula's neck is broken, restoring Ariel's voice and breaking Ursula's enchantment over Eric. Realizing that Ariel was the girl who saved his life, Eric rushes to kiss her, but the sun sets and Ariel transforms back into a mermaid. Ursula reverts to her true form and kidnaps Ariel.

Triton appears and confronts Ursula, but cannot destroy Ursula's contract with Ariel. Triton chooses to sacrifice himself for his daughter, and is transformed into a polyp. Ursula takes Triton's crown and trident, which was her plan from the beginning. Ursula uses her new power to gloat, transforming into a giant, and forming a whirlpool that disturbs several shipwrecks to the surface, one of which Eric commandeers. Just as Ursula is set to use the trident to destroy Ariel, Eric turns the wheel hard to port and runs Ursula through the abdomen with the ship's splintered bowsprit, mortally wounding her. With Ursula gone, her power breaks and the polyps in Ursula's garden (including Triton) turn back into the old merpeople. Later, after seeing that Ariel really loves Eric and that Eric also saved her in the process, Triton willingly changes her from a mermaid into a human using his trident. She runs into Eric's arms, and the two finally get married.

The plot of The Little Mermaid II: Return to the Sea focuses on Ariel's daughter Melody who longs to be a part of the ocean world and is ultimately manipulated by Ursula's vengeful sister, Morgana, into stealing the Trident for her. The film is essentially a re-telling of the first film, to the point that Morgana has two manta ray cohorts very similar to Flotsam and Jetsam, desires the trident and revenge against Triton, and is even voiced by Pat Carroll.

The Little Mermaid: Ariel's Beginning is set before the events of the original film, in which King Triton has banned music from Atlantica, and Ariel, her sisters, Sebastian and Flounder rebel against this new law while a greedy palace official, Marina Del Rey, seeks to claim Sebastian's position for herself.

=== Cast and characters ===
List indicators

This section includes characters who have appeared in the franchise in major or notable supporting roles.

- An empty grey cell indicates the character was not in the film.
- ^{V} indicates a voice-only role.
- ^{D} indicates an appearance as a character's disguised voice.
- ^{S} indicates an appearance as a character's singing voice.
- ^{Y} indicates an appearance as a younger version of a character.

Characters	Films			Television series				Video game	Live-action film
Characters	The Little Mermaid	The Little Mermaid II: Return to the Sea	The Little Mermaid: Ariel's Beginning	The Little Mermaid			Ariel	Ariel's Undersea Adventure	The Little Mermaid
Characters	The Little Mermaid	The Little Mermaid II: Return to the Sea	The Little Mermaid: Ariel's Beginning	Season 1	Season 2	Season 3	Ariel	Ariel's Undersea Adventure	The Little Mermaid
Princess Ariel	Jodi Benson	Jodi Benson	Jodi Benson	Jodi Benson	Jodi Benson	Jodi Benson	Mykal-Michelle Harris	Jodi Benson	Halle Bailey
Sebastian (Note: Full name is revealed in the first film to be "Horatio Thelonious Ignacious Crustaceous Sebastian")	Samuel E. Wright	Samuel E. Wright	Samuel E. Wright	Samuel E. Wright	Samuel E. Wright	Samuel E. Wright	Kevin Michael Richardson	Character is mute	Daveed Diggs
King Triton	Kenneth Mars	Kenneth Mars	Jim Cummings	Kenneth Mars	Kenneth Mars	Kenneth Mars	Taye Diggs Jeremiah Felder^{Y}	Character is mute	Javier Bardem
Flounder	Jason Marin	Cam Clarke	Parker Goris	Edan Gross	Bradley Pierce	Bradley Pierce	Gracen Newton	Parker Goris	Jacob Tremblay
Prince Eric	Christopher Daniel Barnes	Rob Paulsen		Jeff Bennett		Jeff Bennett			Jonah Hauer-King
Ursula	Pat Carroll	Painting			Pat Carroll	Pat Carroll	Amber Riley	Character is mute	Melissa McCarthy
Ursula	Jodi Benson^{D}	Painting			Pat Carroll	Pat Carroll	Amber Riley	Character is mute	Jessica Alexander^{D} (Note: Disguised as a separate character named Vanessa.)
Scuttle	Buddy Hackett	Buddy Hackett	Silent cameo			Maurice LaMarche		Character is mute	Awkwafina
Grimsby	Ben Wright	Kay E. Kuter				Kay E. Kuter			Art Malik
Chef Louis	René Auberjonois	René Auberjonois				René Auberjonois	Yanic Truesdale		
Carlotta	Edie McClurg	Edie McClurg							Martina Laird
Max	Animal sounds only	Animal sounds only		Animal sounds only		Animal sounds only			Gary and Edna
Flotsam and Jetsam	Paddi Edwards				Paddi Edwards	Paddi Edwards		Characters are mute	Characters are mute
Alana	Kimmy Robertson		Jennifer Hale	Kimmy Robertson	Kimmy Robertson	Kimmy Robertson	Jessica Mikayla		Simone Ashley
Arista	Kimmy Robertson		Grey DeLisle	Mary Kay Bergman	Mary Kay Bergman	Mary Kay Bergman		Character is mute	Kajsa Mohammar
Adella	Kimmy Robertson	Silent cameo	Tara Strong	Sherry Lynn	Sherry Lynn	Sherry Lynn			Nathalie Sorrell
Andrina	Kimmy Robertson	Silent cameo	Tara Strong	Cathy Cavadini	Cathy Cavadini	Cathy Cavadini			Lorena Andrea
Attina	Caroline Vasicek	Silent cameo	Kari Wahlgren	Kath Soucie	Kath Soucie	Kath Soucie			Karolina Conchet
Aquata	Caroline Vasicek	Silent cameo	Grey DeLisle	Mona Marshall	Mona Marshall	Mona Marshall		Character is mute	Sienna King
Seahorse Herald	Will Ryan	Unspecified voice actor		Charlie Adler					
Princess Melody		Tara Strong							
Morgana		Pat Carroll							
Tip		Max Casella							
Dash		Stephen Furst							
Undertow		Clancy Brown							
Marina Del Ray			Sally Field						
Benjamin			Jeff Bennett						
Ray-Ray			Kevin Michael Richardson						
Cheeks			Kevin Michael Richardson						
Ink Spot			Rob Paulsen						
Shelbow			Jim Cummings						
Swifty			Rob Paulsen						
Queen Athena			Lorelei Hill Butters						
Queen Athena			Andrea Robinson^{S}						
Swordfish Guards			Jeff Bennett						
Urchin				Danny Cooksey	Danny Cooksey	Danny Cooksey			
Evil Manta				Tim Curry	Tim Curry	Tim Curry			
Moray				Dave Coulier	Dave Coulier	Dave Coulier			
Dudley				Dave Coulier	Dave Coulier	Dave Coulier			
Emperor Sharga				Jim Cummings		Jim Cummings			
Spot				Frank Welker	Frank Welker				
Lobster Mobster				Joe Alaskey					
Da Shrimp				David Lander					
Gabriella					Character is mute, uses sign language	Character is mute, uses sign language			
Ollie					Whitby Hertford	Whitby Hertford			

== Crew ==
Occupation	Film			
Occupation	The Little Mermaid	The Little Mermaid II: Return to the Sea	The Little Mermaid: Ariel's Beginning	The Little Mermaid
Director(s)	John Musker; Ron Clements	Jim Kammerud; Brian Smith	Peggy Holmes	Rob Marshall
Producer(s)	Howard Ashman; John Musker	Leslie Hough; David Lovegren	Kendra Halland	Marc Platt; Lin-Manuel Miranda; John DeLuca; Rob Marshall
Writer(s)	John Musker; Ron Clements	Elizabeth Anderson; Temple Mathews; Elise D'Haene; Eddie Guzelian	Robert Reece; Evan Spiliotopoulos; Jule Selbo; Jenny Wingfield	David Magee
Composer(s)	Alan Menken	Danny Troob	James Dooley	Alan Menken
Songwriter(s)	Howard Ashman; Alan Menken	Michael Silversher; Patty Silversher	Jeanine Tesori	Alan Menken; Howard Ashman; Lin-Manuel Miranda
Editor(s)	Mark Hester	—N/a	John Royer	Wyatt Smith

== Animated feature films ==
=== The Little Mermaid ===
The Little Mermaid is the original film of the franchise. It was produced by Walt Disney Animation Studios, and was released to theaters on November 17, 1989, by Walt Disney Pictures. It was directed by Ron Clements and John Musker, and produced by Musker and Howard Ashman. The film was a critical and commercial success. The Little Mermaid belongs to an era known as the Disney Renaissance. It is based on Hans Christian Andersen's 1837 fairy tale of the same name. In 2022, The Little Mermaid was selected for preservation in the National Film Registry by the Library of Congress for being "culturally, historically, or aesthetically significant".

=== The Little Mermaid II: Return to the Sea ===
The Little Mermaid II: Return to the Sea is a direct-to-video sequel to the first film. It was released by Walt Disney Studios Home Entertainment on VHS in the United States on September 19, 2000. It was directed by Jim Kammerud and Brian Smith, and produced by Leslie Hough and David Lovegren. In 2006, the film was bundled together with the original film in the Region 2 release. The original DVD release has been discontinued. A special edition DVD with a deleted song, "Gonna Get My Wish", and a new game was released on December 16, 2008. Unlike its predecessor, The Little Mermaid II: Return to the Sea received generally negative reviews from critics, with the criticism reserved for the film being a repetition of the first film, but the character of Melody was praised.

=== The Little Mermaid: Ariel's Beginning ===
The Little Mermaid: Ariel's Beginning is a direct-to-video prequel to the original film. The film was released on Region 1 DVD in the United States on August 26, 2008, and on Region 2 DVD in Europe on September 22, 2008. It was directed by Peggy Holmes and produced by Kendra Halland. The film contains special features including deleted scenes, a production featurette hosted by the director, games and activities, and a featurette hosted by Sierra Boggess about the Broadway musical. The Little Mermaid: Ariel's Beginning received mixed reviews, with praise given to the animation quality, but the film's music and new villain, Marina Del Rey, were criticized for being inferior to those found in the original film.

== Live-action remake ==
In May 2016, Deadline Hollywood reported that Disney was in early development for a live-action adaptation of the film. Three months later, it was announced that Alan Menken would return as the film's composer and write new songs alongside Lin-Manuel Miranda, who will also co-produce the movie with Marc Platt. In December 2018, Rob Marshall was officially hired as director for the film.

Halle Bailey was cast in the starring role as Ariel, and Jonah Hauer-King was cast as Prince Eric. Javier Bardem plays her father King Triton, while Melissa McCarthy, Jacob Tremblay, and Nora "Awkwafina" Lum portray Ursula, Flounder, and a gender-swapped Scuttle, respectively.

Principal photography was originally scheduled to begin in April 2020, but production on the film was temporarily halted in March 2020 due to the COVID-19 pandemic. Filming was expected to begin as early as July or August 2020. Ultimately filming had finally begun by the end of January 2021, at Pinewood Studios in Iver, England. Additional filming took place in Sardinia for a total of "roughly three months" in the summer of 2021. Filming was completed on July 11, 2021. The film was released on May 26, 2023.

== Television ==
=== The Little Mermaid TV series ===
Disney's The Little Mermaid is an animated television series featuring the adventures of Ariel as a mermaid prior to the events of the first film. This series is the first Disney television series to be spun off from a major animated film. The Little Mermaid premiered in the fall of 1992 with the animated prime time special called "A Whale of a Tale", then moved to Saturday mornings. This series originally appeared on CBS, with an original run from 1992 to 1994. It was later shown in reruns on The Disney Channel and Toon Disney. Some of the episodes contain musical segments, featuring original songs written for the series. The opening theme to the show is a combination of the songs "Part of Your World", "Under the Sea" and "Kiss the Girl".

=== Sebastian shorts ===
A series of shorts starring Sebastian were aired as part of another Disney Saturday morning series for CBS, Marsupilami, which ran from 1993 to 1995.

=== The Little Mermaid Live! ===
On May 16, 2017, ABC announced that it planned to air The Wonderful World of Disney: The Little Mermaid Live, on October 3, 2017, which would have featured a broadcast of the film with a similar concert format (aiming to appeal to the recent trend of live made-for-TV productions of Broadway musicals on television). However, on August 3, 2017, it was announced that the special had been dropped due to budget issues. On August 5, 2019, ABC announced that the project was revived and would air November 5 of that year with Auliʻi Cravalho, Queen Latifah and Shaggy starring as Ariel, Ursula and Sebastian, respectively. The cast also included John Stamos as Chef Louis, Amber Riley as Daughters of Triton Emcee and Graham Phillips as Prince Eric. The special featured music from both the film and the Tony Award-nominated Broadway adaptation and would be performed in front of a live audience with giant projection surface. The show was produced by Done+Dusted with director-executive producer Hamish Hamilton and executive producer Richard Kraft and is still expected to be ABC's first live musical. The air date was selected to allow the program to have advertising for the November 12, 2019 launch of Disney+ streaming service and to mark the film's 30th anniversary. Jodi Benson introduced the special.

=== Ariel ===
At the 2023 Annecy Festival, Disney announced an animated series titled Ariel for Disney Junior. The series will follow a young Ariel, bearing an appearance and design with influence taken from Halle Bailey's portrayal of the character and an artstyle that more closely resembles the aesthetic of the original. It premiered on June 27, 2024.

== Stage musical ==
A pre-Broadway stage version premiered in September 2007 in Denver, Colorado, at the Ellie Caulkins Opera House, with music by Alan Menken, new lyrics by Glenn Slater, and a book by Doug Wright. The musical began performances on Broadway at the Lunt-Fontanne Theatre on November 3, 2007, and officially opened on January 10, 2008. The original cast featured Sierra Boggess as Ariel, Norm Lewis as King Triton, Sherie Rene Scott as Ursula, Eddie Korbich as Scuttle, Tituss Burgess as Sebastian, Sean Palmer as Prince Eric, Jonathan Freeman as Grimsby, Derrick Baskin as Jetsam, Tyler Maynard as Flotsam, Cody Hanford and J.J. Singleton as Flounder, and John Treacy Egan as Chef Louis. Notable replacements included Faith Prince as Ursula and Drew Seeley as Eric.

The show closed on Broadway August 30, 2009, after 685 performances and 50 previews.

== Video games ==
There are several video games based on the films, and the characters have made appearances in other crossover video games.

=== The Little Mermaid video game ===
The Little Mermaid the video game was developed by Capcom for the NES and Game Boy, and published in 1991. It is a single player side-scrolling action game where the player controls Ariel on a quest to defeat Ursula. Ariel has already met Eric, and they plan to wed, but Ursula has taken control of the ocean. So Ariel (After explaining what's going on to Eric) becomes a mermaid once more and sets off to rescue the sea. The game takes place from a side view and Ariel (swimming most of the time, but hopping around on the land occasionally) can shoot bubbles to trap her foes and can then throw them at each other. She can also dig through sand to find treasure and pick up sea shells to break chests open with. The treasure she finds in the sand is usually just bonus points, but the treasure you find in chests will increase your bubble's power and range. The gameplay is similar to other Capcom games such as Chip 'n Dale Rescue Rangers and DuckTales in that Ariel shoots air bubbles from her tail that when they hit certain enemies, can be picked up and thrown at other enemies or bosses. Ariel can also collect icons scattered throughout the levels to restore health, gain extra lives, or increase the range/power of her air bubbles.

There are some differences between the NES and the Game Boy versions. When a stage begins, Ariel descends from the top of the screen to the recommended starting point in the NES version, but just starts out in the recommended position in the Game Boy version. The featured SFX are different in both versions. The start of the stage's BGM can be heard only once in the NES version; although the whole BGM can be repeated in the Game Boy version. The stage backgrounds were more restricted in the Game Boy version than in the NES version. When you lose a heart, the heart turns into a heart frame in the NES version, but disappears in the Game Boy version. The key scales of the Boss BGM are different in both versions. The BGM speed in the NES version is much faster than in the Game Boy version.

=== Ariel the Little Mermaid ===
Ariel the Little Mermaid is a video game published by Sega in 1992 for the Mega Drive/Genesis and Game Gear (a Master System version was released by Tec Toy in Brazil). The player controls either Ariel or King Triton to defeat Ursula. Rescuing requires the player to simply swim into the unfortunate little victims as they hang about at fixed places in the watery world; while fending off and dodging enemies like eels, clams, sharks, and several other sea meanies. Friends like Flounder and Sebastian can also be summoned for a little helping hand.

=== The Little Mermaid Pinball ===
The Little Mermaid Pinball is based on The Little Mermaid. It is a Windows pinball video game developed by Disney Online. It was released worldwide in multiple languages, including English, German, French, Italian, and Spanish.

=== The Little Mermaid: Magic in Two Kingdoms ===
The Little Mermaid: Magic in Two Kingdoms, by Buena Vista Games, was released for the Game Boy Advance. A The Little Mermaid hand-held LCD game from Tiger Electronics was also released in 1993.

=== Ariel's Story Studio Create, Learn and Play In A Living World ===
It's an animated storybook that was released on November 25, 1997. It's a PC game and it's an interactive storybook where you can create your own story and allows the player to create their own little story through words and pictures.

=== The Little Mermaid II video game ===
The Little Mermaid II is based on The Little Mermaid II: Return to the Sea. Including elements of both Little Mermaid movies, this game finds Ariel and her daughter Melody on a mission to rescue Prince Eric and foil Ursula and Morgana's nefarious plot. It is a side-scrolling video game developed by Blitz Games and published by THQ for the PlayStation console. It was first released in North America on September 24, 2000, and was later released in PAL regions.

=== The Little Mermaid 2: Pinball Frenzy ===
The Little Mermaid 2: Pinball Frenzy is based on The Little Mermaid II: Return to the Sea. It is a pinball video game developed by Left Field Productions and published by Nintendo for the Game Boy Color handheld video game console. It was first released in North America and was later released in PAL regions.

=== Disney's The Little Mermaid: Ariel's Undersea Adventure ===
Disney's The Little Mermaid: Ariel's Undersea Adventure was released on the Nintendo DS on October 2, 2006.

=== Kingdom Hearts series ===
Characters and the setting from the first film appear in Disney/Square's Kingdom Hearts series of video games. Atlantica appears as a world in Kingdom Hearts, Kingdom Hearts: Chain of Memories and Kingdom Hearts II, where Ariel appears as a party member in the first game, while Ursula is the boss in the world and one of the members of Maleficent's inner circle. Other characters from the film also make appearances. Ursula returns as a boss in Kingdom Hearts 3D: Dream Drop Distance, while Ariel returns as a character to summon in Kingdom Hearts III.

=== Ariel's Musical Surprise ===
Ariel's Musical Surprise, was released on iOS and published by Disney Mobile Studios on October 10, 2013.

=== The Little Mermaid: Undersea Treasures ===
The Little Mermaid: Undersea Treasures, a hidden object PC game by Microsoft Studios was released in a preview playable form on December 20, 2013, with plans for further game options in the future.

=== Disney Magic Kingdoms ===
In the world builder video game Disney Magic Kingdoms, Eric's castle appear as part of the environment. A limited time Event based on The Little Mermaid introduced Ariel, Prince Eric, Flounder, Sebastian, Scuttle, King Triton and Ursula as playable characters, as well as Atlantica, Ariel's Grotto, Ursula's Lair and Under the Sea as attractions. In the game, the characters are involved in new storylines that serve as a continuation of The Little Mermaid (ignoring other material in the franchise).

=== Disney Mirrorverse ===
The video game Disney Mirrorverse includes an alternate version of Ariel from the 1989 film and another of the King Triton from the 2023 film.

=== Disney Dreamlight Valley ===
Ariel, Eric, and Ursula appear as villagers of the titular valley of the video game Disney Dreamlight Valley.

=== Disney Speedstorm ===
Ariel, Eric, Ursula, Triton, and a map based on Atlantica are expected to appear in the sixth season of the kart racing game Disney Speedstorm on February 8, 2024.

== Other media ==
Several attractions based on The Little Mermaid have been released. Mermaid Lagoon at Tokyo DisneySea is a themed land made to look like the Palace of King Triton and features fanciful seashell-inspired architecture. It includes the meet-and-greet attraction Ariel's Grotto, as well as the parachute jump–style ride Jumpin' Jellyfish (also present in Disney California Adventure). King Triton's Carousel of the Sea is a Carousel at Disney California Adventure that uses sea horses, flying fish, whales, dolphins, sea lions, otters and garibaldi. Voyage of the Little Mermaid (which was being replaced by a new show, The Little Mermaid - A Musical Adventure) is a live show attraction at Disney Hollywood Studios in Florida that features puppets and live actors. Other attractions based on the film include The Little Mermaid: Ariel's Undersea Adventure, a dark ride at Disney California Adventure in Paradise Pier and the Magic Kingdom in Fantasyland.

Ariel is part of the Disney Princess franchise, an extensive line of merchandise that includes dolls, sing-along videos, and a variety of other children's products, apparel, and even adhesive bandages. Ursula, on the other hand, is part of the official line-up of the Disney Villains franchise.

Many characters from the franchise appear in the television series House of Mouse. Some of them also appear in the series' spin-off film Mickey's Magical Christmas: Snowed in at the House of Mouse, and Ursula appears as one of the main villains in Mickey's House of Villains. The characters also appear at Walt Disney Parks and Resorts as a meet and greet characters.

Ariel appears in Sofia the First: The Floating Palace, a television special that was aired as part of the series Sofia the First and released on Region 1 DVD on November 24, 2013.

The Disney Wish cruise ship of the Disney Cruise Line has a live show adaptation of the film that premiered in 2022.

=== Printed adaptations ===
Disney Comics released a four-issue "The Little Mermaid Limited Series" comic series and two issues of "Sebastian from The Little Mermaid" comics in 1992. Marvel Comics released its own title, "Disney's The Little Mermaid" in 1994, which ran for twelve issues. All the comics are prequels to the film, and feature Ariel still a mermaid living under the sea.

A series of twelve prequel novels were published in 1994, following the adventures of young Ariel living under the sea with her sisters and father. The titles are: "Green-Eyed Pearl" and "Nefazia Visits the Palace" by Suzanne Weyn; "Reflections of Arsulu" and "The Same Old Song" by Marilyn Kaye; "Arista's New Boyfriend" and "Ariel the Spy" by M. J. Carr; "King Triton, Beware!", "The Haunted Palace" and "The Boyfriend Mix-Up" by Katherine Applegate; "The Practical-Joke War" by Stephanie St. Pierre; "The Dolphins of Coral Cove" by K. S. Rodriguez; and "Alana's Secret Friend" by Jess Christopher. Also published in 1994 is "Tales from Under the Sea", an illustrated book containing 22 stories and poems about the characters from the film.

In 2009 Disney Press started a young adult novel series retelling various films of the animated Disney canon but set from the point of view of its villains. The novels are written by Serena Valentino, and the third entry in the series was Poor Unfortunate Soul: A Tale of the Sea Witch, which was released in July 2016.

Between 2019 and 2020, Dark Horse Comics published a three-issue adaptation of the original film. Written by Cecil Castellucci, the comics retold the film from Ariel's point of view, including her interior dialogue while she was on land.

A series of books based on the 2023 live-action adaptation film were released on April 11, 2023, by Disney Press. It includes an illustrated picture book titled The Little Mermaid: Make A Splash by Ashley Franklin and Paul Kellam. The guidebook The Little Mermaid: Guide to Merfolk detailing the depictions of Ariel, her sisters, and universe from the film by Eric Geron. The novelization of the film titled The Little Mermaid: The Novelization by Faith Noelle. The Little Mermaid: This is Ariel by Colin Hosten. And the young adult novel The Little Mermaid: Against the Tide by American author J. Elle. The novel serves as a prequel. It featured on The New York Times Best Seller list, where it spent several weeks in the top ten and reached the fifth spot in the category "Young Adult Hardcover Books."
