= The Little Mermaid II: Return to the Sea =

2000 animated film directed by Jim Kammerud

- Home video release poster
- Directed by: Jim Kammerud
- Written by: Elizabeth Anderson; Temple Mathews; Elise D'Haene; Eddie Guzelian
- Based on: The Little Mermaid by Hans Christian Andersen
- Produced by: Leslie Hough; David Lovegren
- Starring: Tara Strong; Jodi Benson; Samuel E. Wright; Pat Carroll; Max Casella; Stephen Furst; Rob Paulsen; Kenneth Mars; Buddy Hackett; Cam Clarke; Clancy Brown
- Music by: Danny Troob
- Production company: Walt Disney Television Animation (Note: Animation services handled by Walt Disney Animation Australia and Disney Animation Canada.)
- Distributed by: Buena Vista Home Entertainment (Note: Under Walt Disney Home Video imprint and the Walt Disney Pictures banner.)
- Release date: September 19, 2000
- Running time: 75 minutes
- Countries: Australia; Canada; United States
- Language: English

The Little Mermaid II: Return to the Sea is a 2000 animated direct-to-video musical fantasy film produced by Walt Disney Television Animation. It is the sequel to the 1989 Walt Disney Animation Studios film, The Little Mermaid and the second installment in The Little Mermaid trilogy. Directed by Jim Kammerud, the film focuses on Ariel and Eric's daughter Melody, a human princess who longs to swim in the ocean despite her parents' refusing to let her because of them trying to protect her from Morgana, Ursula's younger sister.

Many voice actors from the original film reprised their roles, including Jodi Benson as Ariel, Kenneth Mars as King Triton, Samuel E. Wright as Sebastian, and Buddy Hackett (in his final film role before his death in 2003) as Scuttle. Pat Carroll, who voiced Ursula in the first film, returned as Morgana. Tara Strong joined the cast as Melody, with Rob Paulsen replacing Christopher Daniel Barnes as Prince Eric. Ben Wright, the original voice of Grimsby, died four months before the first film was released and, as a result, was replaced by Kay E. Kuter. Additionally, Cam Clarke portrayed a now adult Flounder, previously voiced by Jason Marin.

The Little Mermaid II: Return to the Sea was released by Buena Vista Home Entertainment on September 19, 2000. The film received generally negative reviews. In 2008, Disney released a third film, The Little Mermaid: Ariel's Beginning, which is a prequel to the first film.

== Plot ==
Some time after Ursula's demise, Ariel and Eric have had a daughter, named Melody, who is the first human-mermaid hybrid in existence. On the day of Melody's christening at sea, Ariel's father King Triton presents Melody with a magic locket that bears her name, meant to remind her that a part of her will always belong to the ocean.

The party is interrupted by Ursula's vengeful sister Morgana, who threatens to have Melody fed to her tiger shark sidekick, Undertow, unless Triton gives his trident to her as part of her plan to seize rule of the ocean. Ariel and Eric work together to foil Morgana's plan, and Triton transforms Undertow into a piranha who retains his stripes and big dorsal fin. Morgana escapes, eluding the attempts of Triton's forces to capture her and vowing revenge on both Ariel and Triton for Ursula's death. Fearing Morgana, and remembering Ursula's terrible power, Ariel decides to withhold all knowledge of Melody’s mermaid heritage from her until Morgana is captured. Triton tosses the locket into the ocean, and a wall is built to separate the royal castle from the sea. Triton assigns Sebastian to watch over Melody.

As Melody grows, she remains unaware of her mother's mermaid heritage. She disregards Ariel's warning against going out to sea regularly to swim, and one year finds the locket on her birthday. When she is reminded by Sebastian of her birthday party, she rushes home to get ready, but once she appears at the party it becomes a huge disaster and the kingdom's subjects make fun of her. Melody runs to her room and holds the locket for consolation. Seeing her name on the locket, Melody asks Ariel about it, but receives no answers, so she slips out and sails away from home. Melody is discovered by Undertow, who leads her to Morgana. A desperate Sebastian tells Ariel and Eric that Melody went out to the sea.

Meanwhile, Melody meets Morgana, who reveals Melody's background, and uses the remnants of Ursula's magic to transform Melody into a mermaid. Triton prepares search parties and is convinced by Ariel and Eric to use his trident to transform Ariel back into a mermaid in order to help in the search for Melody. Ariel searches the sea for Melody, regretting not sharing her heritage with her, while Melody explores her newfound abilities as a mermaid, and has a strong feeling that she was meant to be part of the world under the sea.

Morgana tells Melody she can only make the spell permanent if she retrieves Triton's trident. During her search for the trident, Melody befriends Tip and Dash, a penguin and walrus duo, who join her. After Melody steals the trident, Ariel implores her not to give it to Morgana. Frustrated by Ariel's decision to lie to her, Melody gives the trident to Morgana, who reveals her true intentions and traps Melody in a cave by sealing the entrance with a thick layer of ice. Soon afterward, Morgana's spell on Melody wears off, causing her to revert into human form and nearly drown. Tip and Dash manage to free her and drag her to the shore.

Morgana uses the trident's magic to become lord of the ocean, rising to the surface to gloat. Scuttle, Triton, Sebastian, and Eric arrive, and a battle ensues against Morgana and her minions. Melody grabs the trident and throws it back to Triton, who encases Morgana in a block of ice, which sinks underwater. Melody reunites with her family, and Triton offers to let his granddaughter become a mermaid permanently. Melody instead uses the trident to destroy the wall separating her home from the sea, reuniting the humans and the merpeople.

== Voice cast ==
- Tara Strong as Melody
- Jodi Benson as Ariel
- Samuel E. Wright as Sebastian
- Pat Carroll as Morgana
- Max Casella as Tip
- Stephen Furst as Dash
- Rob Paulsen as Eric
- Kenneth Mars as King Triton
- Cam Clarke as Flounder
- Buddy Hackett as Scuttle
- Clancy Brown as Undertow
- René Auberjonois as Chef Louis
- Kay E. Kuter as Grimsby
- Edie McClurg as Carlotta
- Dee Bradley Baker as Cloak and Dagger
- Frank Welker as Max

== Release ==
The film was released directly to video on September 19, 2000. It was released on May 7, 2001, in the UK. On November 6, 2006, the film was released in a bundle together with the original film in the Region 2 release. The original DVD release was later discontinued and a special edition DVD with a deleted song, "Gonna Get My Wish", and a new game was released on December 16, 2008. A package called The Little Mermaid Trilogy, which includes all three Little Mermaid films, was released on the same day. This film, along with The Little Mermaid: Ariel's Beginning, was released in a 2-Movie collection on DVD and Blu-ray on November 19, 2013.

== Reception ==
=== Critical reception ===
Review aggregator Rotten Tomatoes reports that 20% of 5 critics gave the film a positive review, and the average rating is 4.1/10. In 2011, Total Film ranked it as 27th among the 50 worst children's films ever made.

=== Home video sales ===
The film was the tenth most successful direct-to-video release of 2000, with retail revenues of $121 million. The film sold 6 million VHS and DVD units in 2000.

== Soundtrack ==
Songs from The Little Mermaid 2: Return to the Sea & More!

Soundtrack album by Various artists
- Released: September 19, 2000
- Length: 25:21
- Label: Walt Disney Records
- Producer: Bambi Moe

The film's official soundtrack was released on September 19, 2000, and again on October 31, 2000, in a special edition double pack with the original film's soundtrack. Additionally, two limited-edition two-track samplers were released on CD as a promotion for the soundtrack.

No.	Title	Writer(s)	Recording artist(s)	Length
1.	"Down to the Sea"	Michael and Patty Silversher	Jodi Benson, Rob Paulsen, Clancy Brown, Kay E. Kuter, Samuel E. Wright and Chorus	3:29
2.	"Tip and Dash"	Michael and Patty Silversher	Max Casella, Stephen Furst and Tara Charendoff	1:59
3.	"Iko Iko" (*)	Barbara Ann Hawkins, Jessie Thomas, Joan Johnson, Maralyn Jones, Joe Jones, Rose Lee Hawkins, Sharon Jones	Wright	3:49
4.	"Octopus's Garden" (*)	Richard Starkey	Wright	2:47
5.	"For a Moment"	Michael and Patty Silversher	Benson, Charendoff	2:28
6.	"Give a Little Love" (*)	Albert Hammond, Diane Warren	Wright	3:57
7.	"Hot, Hot, Hot" (-)	Alphonsus Cassell	Wright	5:08
8.	"Here on the Land and Sea" (Finale)	Michael and Patty Silversher	Benson, Charendoff, Wright and Chorus	1:44
Total length:				25:21

Limited edition two track CD 1
No.	Title	Writer(s)	Recording artist(s)	Length
1.	"Part of Your World"	Alan Menken, Howard Ashman	Chely Wright	3:25
2.	"Limbo Rock" (*)		Wright	2:29

Limited edition two track CD 2
No.	Title	Writer(s)	Recording artist(s)	Length
1.	"Here on the Land and Sea" (Finale)	Michael and Patty Silversher	Benson, Charendoff, Wright and Chorus	1:44
2.	"Coconut" (*)	Harry Nilsson	Wright

Note #1: *This track was taken from the album Sebastian: Party Gras!.

Note #2: -This track was taken from the album Sebastian from The Little Mermaid.

The end credits play a new recording of "Part of Your World", performed by country singer Chely Wright. Another version of the song, performed by Ann Marie Boskovich, was used in some international releases.

== Legacy ==
When asked about a possible sequel for the 2023 live-action remake of The Little Mermaid, stars Halle Bailey (Ariel) and Jonah Hauer-King (Eric) mentioned Return to the Sea and considered a similar plot with Melody's character. In the same interview, Bailey added that she "loves" the sequel, while Hauer-King suggested that Eric, too, be transformed into a merman in the potential sequel as well.

== See also ==
- List of films about witchcraft
