= You Can Get It If You Really Want =

- UK 7" vinyl single cover

Single by Desmond Dekker

from the album You Can Get It If You Really Want
- B-side: "Perseverance"
- Released: 21 July 1970
- Genre: Reggae
- Length: 2:44
- Label: Trojan
- Songwriter: Jimmy Cliff
- Producers: Leslie Kong; John Kelly

Desmond Dekker singles chronology
"Pickney Gal" (1969)	"You Can Get It If You Really Want" (1970)	"The Song We Used to Sing" (1970)

"You Can Get It If You Really Want" is a reggae song written and originally recorded by Jamaican singer songwriter Jimmy Cliff and released as a single in July 1970. Another version, recorded by Jamaican singer Desmond Dekker (using the same instrumental tracks as Cliff's version) and released within a few weeks of Cliff's version, became a hit single in a number of markets, reaching number 2 on the UK Singles Chart.

== Charts ==
=== Weekly charts ===
Chart (1970–71)	Peak position
Australia (Go-Set)	12
Australia (Kent Music Report)	17
Belgium (Ultratop 50 Wallonia)	35
Germany (GfK)	9
Netherlands (Dutch Top 40)	17
Netherlands (Single Top 100)	17
Ireland (IRMA)	4
South Africa (Springbok Radio)	4
UK Singles (Official Charts)	2
US Bubbling Under Hot 100 (Billboard)	3

=== Year-end charts ===
Chart (1970)	Position
UK Singles (Official Charts Company)	23

== Certifications ==
Region	Certification	Certified units/sales
United Kingdom (BPI)	Silver	200,000^{‡}
^{‡} Sales+streaming figures based on certification alone.

== Covers ==
- Desmond Dekker released a successful cover version in 1970.
- The UK's Jamaican origin reggae band The Cimarons released it as a single in 1974.
- The song has been covered by a great number of artists including by Italian pop singer Sabrina (Sabrina Salerno) in her 1991 album Over the Pop and by Stiff Little Fingers on their 1999 album Hope Street where the song is retitled "You Can Get It (If Yu Really Want It)".
- French singer Johnny Hallyday sang it in French under the title T'as le bonjour de l'amour released on his album Hollywood in 1979.
- American ska band, The Siren Six, covered the song for their album Young and Professional in 1998.

== In popular culture ==
The Jimmy Cliff song was used in the 1972 film The Harder They Come.

In 1990 the song was used on the album Sebastian from The Little Mermaid as most of the songs were performed by Samuel E. Wright as Sebastian the crab. Wright also performed this version in Sebastian's Caribbean Jambore.

The Jimmy Cliff version was used in the soundtrack of the 1997 film Speed 2: Cruise Control and the 2005 Will Smith film Hitch.

Cliff’s version was used as a musical number in the inaugural episode of the British television musical comedy drama serial Blackpool, whereas Dekker's version was also used in the soundtrack of the 2010 British film Made in Dagenham.

The Jimmy Cliff version was featured in the Marvel Studios I Am Groot short "Magnum Opus".

Desmond Dekker's version was used in the credits sequence of Aardman's 2012 stop motion animated feature film The Pirates! In an Adventure with Scientists!.

== Appearances ==
Jimmy Cliff included his own version of the song on his 2004 compilation album Reggae Night. The Dekker version was included in the triple-disc compilation album released Now That's What I Call Reggae in June 2012.
