= The Little Mermaid: Songs from the Sea =

Studio album by Jodi Benson (as Ariel)
- Released: March 10, 1992 (original release); 1996 (re-release)
- Recorded: 1991–1992
- Studio: Studio Sound Recorders, North Hollywood; Digital Magnetics, Hollywood
- Genre: Pop
- Label: Walt Disney
- Producer: Robin Frederick

Jodi Benson (as Ariel) chronology
Sebastian from The Little Mermaid (1990)	The Little Mermaid: Songs from the Sea (1992)	The Little Mermaid: Splash Hits (1993)

The Little Mermaid: Songs from the Sea is the third of three original albums inspired by Disney's The Little Mermaid film. It is a concept album; listening to the tracks in order will present the story of a typical day in the life of the mermaid Ariel (set sometime before the events of the film).

== Track listing ==
No.	Title	Writer(s)	Performer(s)	Length
1.	"The Sea Kingdom"	Rick Dempsey, Joel Jacks	Jodi Benson, Kenneth Mars, Aleta Braxton, Angie Jaree, Janis Liebhart, Kath Souci, Susie Stevens, Jaclyn Angelotti, Liza Hale Baron, Ray Benson, Edward Delaplaine, Ray McLeod, Ken Neufeld, Julia Parminter, Elaine Reed, Tim Thompson	2:23
2.	"What's it Like to Be a Mermaid?"	Diana Rae, Patty Way	Jodi Benson	3:28
3.	"The Scuttle Strut"	Elli Baer, Tod Cooper	Jodi Benson, Buddy Hackett	2:42
4.	"There's Only One Ariel"	Alan O'Day, Janis Liebhart	Aleta Braxton, Angie Jaree, Janis Liebhart, Kath Souci, Susie Stevens	2:46
5.	"He's a Friend"	Carl Graves, John Finley	Jodi Benson, Samuel E. Wright	3:12
6.	"At the Mermaid's Ball"	Andy DiTaranto, Samuel Wisner	Jodi Benson	2:25
7.	"Party with Me"	Richard Friedman, Phil Baron	Jodi Benson	2:36
8.	"My Room in the Sea"	Nancy Bryan, Elizabeth Pavone	Jodi Benson	2:58
9.	"Dreaming"	Harriet Schock	Jodi Benson	3:36
10.	"H2O, What a Feeling!"	Dave Kinnoin, Jimmy Hammer	Jodi Benson	3:24
11.	"We Share the Earth"	Richard Friedman, George Wilkins, Phil Baron	Jodi Benson	2:56
12.	"Where Mermaids Dwell"	Robin Frederick	Jodi Benson	2:58
Total length:				35:39

== Publishing ==
- Tracks 1–2, 5, 7 and 11 © 1992 Walt Disney Music Company (ASCAP)/Wonderland Music Company, Inc. (BMI).
- Tracks 3–4 and 6 © 1992 Wonderland Music Company, Inc. (BMI).
- Tracks 8–10 and 12 © 1992 Walt Disney Music Company (ASCAP).

== Personnel ==
Credits for The Little Mermaid: Songs from the Sea adapted from album liner notes.

- Executive Producer: Harold J. Kleiner
- Recorded by Gary Lux
- Mixed by Michael Becker
- Recorded and mixed at Studio Sound Recorders, North Hollywood, CA, assisted by Lee Kaiser
- Mastered by Bruce Botnik at Digital Magnetics, Hollywood, CA
- Ariel (credited as The Little Mermaid) vocals by Jodi Benson
- Sebastian vocals by Samuel E. Wright
- Scuttle vocals by Buddy Hackett
- King Triton vocals by Kenneth Mars
- Ariel's sisters' vocals by Aleta Braxton, Angie Jaree, Janis Liebhart, Kath Souci (Princesses Adella, Andrina, and/or Attina), and Susie Stevens
- Merfolk Chorus vocals by Jaclyn Angelotti, Liza Hale Baron, Ray Benson, Edward Delaplaine, Ray McLeod, Ken Neufeld, Julia Parminter, Elaine Reed and Tim Thompson
- Mermaid background vocals by Angie Jaree, Janis Liebhart and Susie Stevens
- Special thanks to Les Perkins, Paula Sigman and Rick Dempsey of Disney Character Voices
