= Enos (TV series) =

- Genre: Sitcom; Action comedy
- Directed by: Rodney Amateau; Michael Caffey; Dennis Donnelly; Bruce Kessler; Bernard McEveety; Hollingsworth Morse
- Starring: Sonny Shroyer; Samuel E. Wright
- Composer: Dennis McCarthy
- Country of origin: United States
- Original language: English
- No. of seasons: 1
- No. of episodes: 18

Production
- Executive producers: Paul R. Picard; Gy Waldron
- Producers: James Heinz; B. W. Sandefur
- Running time: 60 minutes
- Production companies: Lou Step Productions; Warner Bros. Television

Original release
- Network: CBS
- Release: November 12, 1980 – May 20, 1981

Related
- The Dukes of Hazzard

Enos is an American action comedy television series and a spin-off of The Dukes of Hazzard. It originally aired on CBS from November 12, 1980, to May 20, 1981.

The series focused on the adventures of Enos Strate, a former deputy in rural Hazzard County, after he moved to Los Angeles to join the LAPD. Sonny Shroyer played the character of Enos on both shows. One reviewer stated that the series was "basically Gomer Pyle in a new uniform."

Enos was broadcast in Canada on both CTV and ATV, now named CTV Atlantic.

== Synopsis ==
While working as a rural deputy in Hazzard County Enos accidentally captured two most-wanted criminals, so impressing the Los Angeles Police Department that they offered him a job in their a newly formed Special Branch. He was teamed with a street-smart black partner, Turk Adams, and was under the watch of Lt. Jacob Broggi.

At times friends from Hazzard County came to see him. In one episode Daisy Duke visited while taking part in an auto race, not knowing she was being used to smuggle a diamond. Enos narrated each episode as viewers heard parts of a letter he was writing to Daisy.

The character Enos Strate returned to The Dukes of Hazzard in autumn 1982, at the start of the show's fifth season. It had been written into Shroyer's contract that he be allowed to return to the series if the spin-off was canceled. In the CBS film specials made years after the series ended—The Dukes of Hazzard: Reunion! (1997) and The Dukes of Hazzard: Hazzard in Hollywood (2000)—Enos appeared as a California lawman. It was explained that he had returned to the LAPD and eventually become a detective.

== Cast ==
- Sonny Shroyer as Enos Strate
- Samuel E. Wright as Turk Adams
- John Dehner as Lt. Joseph Broggi
- John Milford as Captain Dempsey
- C. Peter Munro as Detective Bigelow
- Leo V. Gordon as Sergeant Theodore Kick
- Michelle Pfeiffer as Joy

== Cancellation ==
The series never achieved the ratings CBS had hoped for, partly because it was up against two popular series, Eight Is Enough and Real People. It was cancelled after one season.

== Episodes ==
No.	Title	Directed by	Written by	Original release date
1	"Enos"	Rod Amateau	Gy Waldron	November 12, 1980
Accepted by the LAPD, Enos uses his hometown methods to help break up a prostitution-blackmail case the Department is working on.
2	"Uncle Jesse's Visit"	Rod Amateau	Gy Waldron	November 19, 1980
Uncle Jesse comes to visit Enos and see how he is liking his new job.
3	"Where's the Corpus?"	Michael Caffey	B.W. Sandefur	November 26, 1980
When a noted mobster is killed, and there's no corpse, Enos solves the case with his homespun knowledge.
4	"Blu Flu"	Hollingsworth Morse	Richard Christian Matheson, Thomas E. Szollosi	December 10, 1980
During a police protest known as the "blue flu" when no one but Enos is on duty, a criminal seeks revenge on the judge who sentenced him.
5	"Grits and Greens Strike Again"	Rod Amateau	Gy Waldron	December 17, 1980
Enos and Turk meet a silent film star in a hunt for teenage muggers that leads them to a high class burglary ring.
6	"Snow Job"	Bernard McEveety	A.L. Christopher, Jim Rogers	January 7, 1981
When Enos asks for a Coca-Cola at the local bowling alley, he and Turk get involved in a cocaine smuggling ring.
7	"House Cleaners"	Robert Totten	Milt Rosen	January 14, 1981
When robbers posing as policemen make trouble for Lieutenant Broggi, Enos and Turk help him out.
8	"One Daisy Per Summer"	Richard C. Bennett	Jim Rogers, B.W. Sandefur	January 21, 1981
Daisy Duke arrives in Los Angeles to drive in the Baja Auto Race as Enos and Turk rush to save her from involvement with diamond smugglers.
9	"Horse Cops"	Bruce Kessler	Leonard B. Kaufman, William Kelley	January 28, 1981
When Sheriff Rosco P. Coltrane comes to the big city, he finds more excitement than he expected.
10	"The Head Hunter"	Bernard McEveety	Max Hodge	February 11, 1981
Enos wants $5,000 so he can send it to his old elementary school teacher back in Hazzard County so she won’t be evicted by Boss Hogg. Enos and Turk chase a bank robber, retrieving most of the stolen money. The robber gets away with $5,000—but not before Enos sees his face. In order to get the one cop who’s seen his face disgraced, the robber has a false report filed stating that Officer Strait pocketed the $5,000 before turning in the rest of the money. When the bank confirms that exactly $5,000 was never recovered, Internal Affairs is called in to investigate. Eventually, the real bank robber is caught and Enos’s reputation is cleared. Also, Enos is rewarded with $5,000—which he sends to his old elementary school teacher in Hazzard County so she doesn’t get evicted by Boss Hogg.
11	"The Hostage"	Bruce Kessler	Ray Brenner	February 18, 1981
Counterfeiters take Lt. Broggi prisoner, and Enos and Turk use creative police methods to free him.
12	"Now You See Him, Now You Don't"	Michael Caffey	Robert I. Holt, Stephen Thornley	March 4, 1981
A bank robber of many disguises keeps Enos and Turk on the run.
13	"Once and Fur All"	Bruce Kessler	Jim Rogers	March 11, 1981
Enos is busy with a series of fur robberies while playing Big Brother to Hobie, a young black boy.
14	"Cops at Sea"	Don McDougall	Simon Muntner	March 18, 1981
Turk has been seeing a police psychologist to help him cope with Enos’s wild driving; the psychologist thinks it’s all in Turk’s head, but wants Turk to agree to dispartnering from Enos. When a rash of burglaries sweep the Marina, Enos—who has familiarity with boats and boating—volunteers Turk and himself. The two officers end up falling out of their boat, and are rescued by a ship manned by none other than the burglars; the burglars come to learn that Enos and Turk are cops. The next day, one of the burglars holds his left side and pretends to experience a burst appendix, prompting Enos and Turk to leave their post in the Marina to help get him to an ambulance; since they had abandoned their post, the burglar’s ship was able to sail away undetected. As a result, the two are reassigned away from the Marina. Also, thanks to the psychologist, Turk and Enos are told they can no longer be partner. Turk leaves with his new partner while the psychologist goes on a ride-along with Enos. When the psychologist mentions that the appendix is on the right side, Enos realizes who the burglars are. He calls the cop he trusts the most, Turk, who abandons his new partner to go meet up with Enos to apprehend the crooks; When the psychologist observes Enos’s wild driving, Turk tells him it’s all in his head. After Enos and Turk capture the crooks, the department decides to reinstate their partnership.
15	"The Moonshiners"	Dennis Donnelly	Gerald Sanford	April 1, 1981
When moonshine shows up in the big city, Enos tracks down the perpetrators with the help of a young female singer he knew in Hazzard.
16	"The Shaming of the Shrew"	Hollingsworth Morse	Leo Gordon	April 8, 1981
Enos and Turk have the misfortune to give citations to the Deputy Chief's wife, but their luck changes when they locate and close down an illegal gambling casino.
17	"Pistol Packing Enos"	Dennis Donnelly	Elroy Schwartz	April 15, 1981
Bullets and heroin don't mix, but it takes Enos and Turk a while before they decipher what's happening.
18	"Forever Blowing Baubles"	Bernard McEveety	Rick Mittleman	May 20, 1981
An ancient Egyptian ruby is stolen from a museum and Enos employs some ancient country skills to get it back.
