= List of The Little Mermaid characters =

The main characters in the first film. Top row, from left to right: Ursula, King Triton, Ariel, Eric, and Scuttle. Bottom row: Flounder, Sebastian, and Max.

The following is a list of original characters from Disney's The Little Mermaid franchise, covering the 1989 film, its prequel television series, its direct-to-video sequel and prequel films, stage musical adaptation, and the live-action adaption.

== Introduced in The Little Mermaid ==
=== Ariel ===
Ariel (voiced by Jodi Benson and portrayed by Auli'i Cravalho in The Little Mermaid Live!, Sierra Boggess in the Broadway musical and portrayed by Halle Bailey in the 2023 live-action film) is the protagonist of the franchise. The seventh-born and the youngest daughter of King Triton and the late Queen Athena of the merfolk, Ariel is a fun-loving and mischievous mermaid who, over the course of the original film, becomes human and marries Eric, a human prince. She is the only Disney Princess to reach parenthood in Disney's history, although in a direct-to-video sequel, as in The Little Mermaid II: Return to the Sea, Ariel is the mother of Melody, the film's protagonist.

=== Prince Eric ===
Eric
- First appearance: The Little Mermaid (1989)
- Created by: Ron Clements and John Musker
- Based on: The Prince from "The Little Mermaid" by Hans Christian Andersen
- Portrayed by: Sean Palmer (Broadway debut); Erik Santos (2011 Broadway); Graham Phillips (The Little Mermaid Live!); Jonah Hauer-King (live-action film)
- Voiced by: Christopher Daniel Barnes (1989 film, Kingdom Hearts II, Disney Dreamlight Valley, Disney Speedstorm); Jeff Bennett (TV series); Rob Paulsen (The Little Mermaid II: Return to the Sea)

In-universe information
- Title: Prince
- Family: Queen Selina (adoptive mother; in live-action film); Unnamed father (mentioned)
- Spouse: Ariel (wife)
- Significant other: "Vanessa" (ex-fiancée)
- Children: Melody (daughter)
- Relatives: King Triton (father-in-law); Queen Athena (mother-in-law; deceased); Attina, Alana, Adella, Aquata, Arista and Andrina (sisters-in-law)

Eric is based on the "prince" character of Hans Christian Andersen's 1837 fairy tale "The Little Mermaid", but was adapted by the writer-directors Ron Clements and John Musker for the film adaptation. According to the film's screenplay, Eric had just turned eighteen in the film, which would make him two years older than Ariel. Prince Eric is the only prince in the Disney Princess franchise not to sing in an original movie.

Eric is an eighteen-year-old human prince who lives in a castle in a small coastal town in Europe. After Ariel saves him from drowning in a storm at sea, she drags him to shore and sings to him, leaving Eric haunted by her voice. He searches the kingdom for her to no avail; when he crosses paths with Ariel again, he is unable to identify her, as she has given her voice to Ursula in exchange for legs. He brings her back to his palace and develops feelings for her as they spend time together. However, before he can approach her about them, Ursula, disguised as a human girl named Vanessa, hypnotizes Eric, forcing him to forget about Ariel and believe that Vanessa is the one who saved his life. He nearly marries Vanessa, but Ariel and her friends intervene, breaking Ursula's spell and restoring Ariel's voice to her. Eric realizes that Ariel is the girl he has been looking for, but before they can kiss, the sun sets and Ursula claims Ariel. Eric dives into the sea to help Ariel, and, in the ensuing battle, climbs onto a ship and kills Ursula by impaling her on its prow.

Eric makes cameo appearances in three episodes of the prequel television series: "Thingamajigger" in a non-speaking appearance, "Scuttle", and "Ariel's Treasures".

In the 2000 direct-to-video sequel, Eric is a supporting character. Although he and Ariel are happily married, in order to keep their new daughter Melody safe, they raise her away from the sea, keeping her mermaid heritage secret. They are attacked by Ursula's sister Morgana, who wishes to avenge Ursula.

In the 2007 Broadway musical, the role of Eric was originated by Sean Palmer. Following the death of Eric's father, it is Grimsby's duty to help Eric find a bride so he can return to the throne properly, despite Eric's affinity for exploring the seas. Eric contributes singing vocals to the opening song "Fathoms Below", and performs two solo songs: "Her Voice", a song about Eric's obsession with Ariel's voice that had been written for the original film but discarded, and "One Step Closer", a new song where Eric helps Ariel express herself through dance. Eric also provides vocals in the quartet "If Only", where he expresses confusion over his attraction to Ariel, and his fear that if he finds the girl with the right voice, he might lose Ariel. A new subplot in the stage musical is a singing competition where the eligible princesses in all the land are invited to sing for Eric. The princesses perform in the song "The Contest", which is set to the tune of Ariel's song "Part of Your World". At the end of the performance, Ariel dances for Eric, and he chooses her. The role was also performed by Drew Seeley.

In video games, Eric appears in Kingdom Hearts II in the world of Atlantica. Eric also appears in the video game Disney Magic Kingdoms, as a playable character to unlock for a limited time. In Disney Dreamlight Valley, Eric is one of the villagers of the titular valley.

In the live-action remake of The Little Mermaid, he performs an original song for the character named "Wild Uncharted Waters", where he dreams of going on adventures and voyages.

=== Sebastian ===
Sebastian
- First appearance: The Little Mermaid (1989)
- Created by: Ron Clements & John Musker
- Portrayed by: Tituss Burgess (Broadway debut); OJ Mariano (2011 Broadway); Shaggy (The Little Mermaid Live!)
- Voiced by: Samuel E. Wright (1989–2008); Kevin Michael Richardson (Kingdom Hearts series, Ariel); Keith Ferguson (Disney Parks); Philip Lawrence (2007–present); Daveed Diggs (live-action film)
- Full name: Horatio Thelonious Ignacious Crustaceous Sebastian
- Nationality: Jamaican

Horatio Thelonious Ignacious Crustaceous Sebastian is a red Trinidadian-accented crab. He is the servant and advisor of King Triton, and his main musical composer and best friend. His main songs are "Under the Sea" and "Kiss the Girl".

The character was developed solely for the Disney film and is not derived from the original Hans Christian Andersen story. Early on in the writing and development of the film, the character was originally an English-butler lobster named Clarence; songwriter Howard Ashman proposed changing Clarence to a Jamaican Rastafari crab and shifting the music style throughout the film to reflect this. Duncan Marjoribanks served as Sebastian's supervising animator.

Wright auditioned for the role as though for a stage musical. He could not do a Jamaican accent, so he did a Trinidadian accent during his audition, which Ashman decided to keep. His physicality impressed co-director Ron Clements, who videotaped a repeat performance in order to inspire the animators.

Two reggae albums featuring Wright performing in-character as Sebastian were released under the Walt Disney Records label. The first was Sebastian from The Little Mermaid, featuring one song from The Little Mermaid, along with covers including Three Little Birds, and one original tune. The second, released in October 1991, is Sebastian: Party Gras! This consists of reggae covers of classic songs such as "Iko Iko", "Octopus's Garden", "Twist and Shout", and "What a Wonderful World", as well as one original tune.

Sebastian makes a cameo appearance in Aladdin as the Genie is looking for "Royal Recipes" to transform Aladdin into a prince and sees a recipe for "Alaskan king crab". Sebastian comes out of the book and pinches the Genie's finger as a snippet of "Under the Sea" is played. The Genie responds, "I hate when they do that".

Sebastian appears in the Little Mermaid Broadway musical, where he was originally portrayed by Tituss Burgess, and has also been performed by Alan Mingo Jr. and Rodgelio Douglas Jr. He also appears in The Little Mermaid Live!, portrayed by Shaggy.

Sebastian made an appearance in the first three titles of the Kingdom Hearts series of video games. He also appears in the video game Disney Magic Kingdoms, as a playable character to unlock for a limited time. This version is a fiddler crab. He also appears in the short film Once Upon a Studio, where he stands on the Golden Harp from Fun and Fancy Free composing the music for "When You Wish Upon a Star".

=== Flounder ===
Flounder
- First appearance: The Little Mermaid (1989)
- Created by: Ron Clements & John Musker
- Portrayed by: Trevor Braun (Broadway debut); Lee Viloria (2011 Broadway)
- Voiced by: Jason Marin (1989 film, Sebastian from The Little Mermaid album); Edan Gross (TV series); Cam Clarke (sequel); Anthony Skillman (Disney Princess: Enchanted Journey); Parker Goris (Ariel's Beginning, Kingdom Hearts series); Jacob Tremblay (live-action film); Rachel Bloom (Chip 'n Dale: Rescue Rangers, 2022); Luke Lowe (Once Upon a Studio); Gracen Newton (Ariel); Carson Minniear (Lego Disney Princess: Magical Mayhem)

Flounder is one of the main characters of the franchise. He is a yellow and blue tropical fish and Ariel's best friend. Though easily afraid and prone to panicking under stressful situations like a shark breaching the sunken ship, when Ariel is in trouble, he comes through for her without hesitation. In the film, he is the only character aside from Scuttle, to support Ariel's fascination with human things, giving her a statue of Eric as a gift.

Flounder appears in all episodes of the prequel television series, sharing constant adventures with Ariel, with the episode "The Evil Manta" showing how he first met Ariel when they were children. According to the television series, Flounder's real name is "Guppy Number 35".

Flounder also appears in Jim Henson's Little Mermaid's Island, where he has a twin sister named Sandy.

Flounder has a small role in The Little Mermaid II: Return to the Sea, where he is reunited with Ariel and helps search for Ariel and Eric's daughter Melody, meeting Melody in Morgana's lair. He has grown up and became a father himself, with five children of his own.

He has a larger role in The Little Mermaid: Ariel's Beginning, which shows an alternate version of how he first meets Ariel and later unknowingly leads her to the Catfish Club. He beatboxes and initiates a reprise of "Jump in the Line (Shake, Senora)" when he, Ariel, Sebastian, and the Catfish Club Band are on the run from Atlantica.

Flounder appears in the Kingdom Hearts series, where he retains his role as Ariel's friend. His biggest role in the series is in Kingdom Hearts: Chain of Memories, where Ursula kidnaps him to force Ariel to give her the trident. He also sings his part in the song called "A New Day is Dawning". He also appears in Disney Princess: Enchanted Journey as Ariel's sidekick, voiced by Anthony Skillman. In the game, he is a remote-controlled playable character, holding a big conch shell on his head and catching voice orbs with the player's help. Flounder also appears in the video game Disney Magic Kingdoms, as a playable character to unlock for a limited time.

At the Disney theme parks, Flounder makes cameo appearances in the Mickey's Philharmagic 3D show and in the Hong Kong Disneyland version of "It's a Small World". He has also appeared in the parks as a walk-around character, primarily in parades, shows and special events such as "Mickey's Pirate & Princess Party".

Flounder appears in the stage adaptation of The Little Mermaid. His supporting role is similar to in the film, but he does not give Ariel the statue of Eric and does not help Ariel reach Eric's wedding barge, as the Vanessa subplot has been removed. Flounder performs a new song titled "She's in Love", which he sings with Ariel's sisters when they notice that Ariel has been acting "fishy lately". The stage role was originated by Cody Hanford and J.J. Singleton, who had to leave the show when they grew taller than Sierra Boggess, who originated Ariel. The role was taken over by Trevor Braun and Brian D'Addario. On the Original Broadway Cast Recording, Brian D'Addario performs as Flounder.

Flounder also appears as a puppet in The Little Mermaid Live!.

Flounder also makes a cameo appearance in the 2022 film Chip 'n Dale: Rescue Rangers, voiced by Rachel Bloom. He is among the Toons that are abducted by the Valley Gang for lack of payment, having his appearance altered and made to work in a bootleg version of The Little Mermaid.

Flounder also appears in the special Lego Disney Princess: Magical Mayhem, voiced by Carson Minniear.

=== Scuttle ===
Scuttle
- First appearance: The Little Mermaid (1989)
- Created by: Ron Clements and John Musker
- Portrayed by: Eddie Korbich (Broadway debut); Enrique Canoy (2011 Broadway)
- Voiced by: Buddy Hackett (film, sequel & The Little Mermaid: Songs from the Sea); Maurice LaMarche (all other appearances except ride); Chris Edgerly (The Little Mermaid: Ariel's Undersea Adventure, Disney Princess: My Fairytale Adventure); Awkwafina (live-action film); Jess Harnell (Once Upon a Studio)

Scuttle is a seagull and friend of Ariel. He presents himself as an expert on human objects, with whom Ariel consults about items she salvages, but refers to objects with incorrect names, referring to a fork as a "dinglehopper" and a smoking pipe as a "snarfblatt". He also provides support and advice when he learns that Ariel has to win Eric's heart in three days. On the third day, Scuttle discovers that Vanessa is actually Ursula and tells Ariel.

Scuttle appears in a small role in The Little Mermaid II: Return to the Sea, in which he helps Ariel find her daughter Melody after she runs away.

Scuttle appears in two episodes of the third season of the prequel television series; "Scuttle", where Ariel, Flounder and Sebastian meet him for the first time and he claims his name was originally "Scuttlebutt", but he changed it "for obvious reasons", and "Island of Fear". In these episodes, Scuttle's explanation of human things is a mixture of correct and erroneous.

Scuttle also made a cameo appearance in the Quack Pack episode "Phoniest Home Videos". He also appears in House of Mouse as one of the guests. In the episode "Donald Wants to Fly", Scuttle unsuccessfully tries to teach Donald by telling him to flap his arms. He and Ariel are excited to see Timon using a "dinglehopper" for his magic trick to eat Jiminy Cricket in the episode "Timon and Pumbaa".

In the album The Little Mermaid: Songs from the Sea, Scuttle performs a song called "The Scuttle Strut", which is the third track of the album.

Scuttle appears in the stage adaptation of the original film, where he sings two songs: "Human Stuff" and "Positivity". The role is originated by Eddie Korbich. In the stage musical, Scuttle has a group of seagull friends, and together they perform a tap dance during the "Positoovity" number.

Scuttle has a non-speaking cameo in The Little Mermaid: Ariel's Beginning, appearing when Marina is on a rock at the surface, animated the same way with Ariel when she sings a reprise for "Part of Your World", and is splashed by a wave.

Scuttle also appears in the video game Disney Magic Kingdoms, as a playable character to unlock for a limited time. He also appears in the 2023 short film Once Upon a Studio where he sings "When You Wish Upon a Star" off key like in the original film until his beak was shut by Baloo from The Jungle Book.

In the live-action film, Scuttle is changed into a female Northern gannet, voiced by Awkwafina, in order to be featured in underwater scenes.

=== Ursula ===
Ursula (voiced by Pat Carroll, who also provides her vocals for all canonical animated media until her death in 2022, portrayed by Queen Latifah in The Little Mermaid Live! and Melissa McCarthy in the live-action film) is the main antagonist of the 1989 film. Ursula is based on the "sea witch/sorceress" character in Hans Christian Andersen's story "The Little Mermaid". In the 2007 Broadway musical, the role of Ursula was originated by Sherie Rene Scott. Ursula goes by the nickname of 'wella' to her sorceress friends and minions.

=== King Triton ===
King Triton
- First appearance: The Little Mermaid (1989)
- Created by: Ron Clements & John Musker
- Based on: The Sea King from "The Little Mermaid" by Hans Christian Andersen
- Portrayed by: Norm Lewis (Broadway debut); Calvin Millado (2011 Broadway); Javier Bardem (live-action film)
- Voiced by: Kenneth Mars (1989 film, TV series, sequel, Kingdom Hearts series); Jim Cummings (2008-present)

In-universe information
- Alias: The Sea King
- Title: King of Atlantica
- Family: Poseidon (father); Ursula (sister in some media)
- Spouse: Queen Athena (widowed)
- Children: Attina, Alana, Adella, Aquata, Arista, Andrina and Ariel (daughters)
- Relatives: Crustacea (aunt); Eric (son-in-law); Melody (granddaughter)

King Triton is the ruler of Atlantica, widower of Queen Athena, the father of Ariel and her sisters, and grandfather of Melody. He is based on the sea king, who was unnamed in the original Hans Christian Andersen story. Triton wields a powerful trident, the source of his apparently unlimited power. He has white hair, a white beard, and a white mustache; in the prologue of the prequel film, he has auburn brown hair. The character is inspired by the son of the Greek sea god Poseidon, although the actual Triton is from Greek mythology and has two finned feet.

In The Little Mermaid, Triton shows severe distaste for humans, and Ariel's fascination with them strains their relationship. Because of this, Triton orders his servant, Sebastian, to look after Ariel. When Triton discovers that Ariel has fallen in love with a human prince, Eric, he destroys her grotto and collection of human artifacts in a fit of rage. After Ariel disappears, Triton subsequently blames himself and orders a search for her to apologize, not knowing that she has accepted Ursula's deal and become a human. When Sebastian arrives with news of Ursula's scheme, he offers to take his daughter's place. Triton is transformed into a polyp by Ursula, but is restored to his original form after she is defeated by Eric. Seeing that Ariel is happy with Eric, Triton uses his trident to transform her into a human.

Triton is a regular character in the prequel television series, in which he is stated to be the son of Poseidon. A number of episodes show conflict between him and Ariel.

Triton appears in the sequel, The Little Mermaid II: Return to the Sea, where he meets his newborn granddaughter Melody and gifts her a necklace to show her mermaid heritage. However, after Melody's life is threatened by Ursula's sister Morgana, Ariel decides that for Melody's safety, she must not know about the sea or her mermaid heritage, meaning that she cannot have contact with Triton and the other merfolk. Triton reluctantly throws the necklace away and assigns Sebastian to watch over Melody for him. Twelve years later, after Melody goes out to sea, Triton turns Ariel back into a mermaid to look for her. Morgana tricks Melody into stealing Triton's trident and makes Triton and the other merfolk bow to her, but Melody, being human, is immune to the spell and takes back the trident and throws it to Triton, who defeats Morgana by trapping her in a block of ice. Triton then asks Melody if she wishes to be a mermaid permanently, but Melody instead wishes to destroy the wall that was built to prevent her from getting to the sea.

In the 2008 direct-to-DVD prequel The Little Mermaid: Ariel's Beginning, Triton bans music from Atlantica after his wife Athena is crushed to death by a pirate ship. He forces everyone and the city to follow a strict daily schedule, straining his relationship with free-spirited Ariel. He eventually lifts the ban on music and appoints Sebastian as his court composer. Jim Cummings replaces Kenneth Mars as the current voice of King Triton, due to Mars' pancreatic cancer diagnosis.

In the stage musical, Triton is Ursula's older brother, and the two are each given equal share of the sea and one magical item each. When Ursula began to abuse her power, Triton exiled her, though he did not take away her Nautilus shell. This stage role is originated by Norm Lewis.

In the Kingdom Hearts series of video games, Triton reprises his role as over-protective father and king of Atlantica. In the first game, his relationship with Ariel becomes strained due to his daughter's desire to see other worlds, and he initially distrusts Sora, Donald, and Goofy when they first arrive in Atlantica, having heard from legend the potential the Keyblade has for destruction. However, he comes to respect Sora after he defeats Ursula and locks the world's keyhole. In Kingdom Hearts II, Triton's relationship with Ariel is strained, this time thanks to Ariel's fascination with the human world. He asks Sora, Donald and Goofy to take part in the music concert with Ariel, but Sora ignores Triton's request and helps Ariel become human to find and fall in love with Eric. He is also part of the song called "A New Day is Dawning". After Ursula is defeated once again, he respectfully bids a final farewell to Sora. King Triton is referenced in the film The Princess and the Frog, as a parade float during the Mardi Gras. Triton also appears in the video game Disney Magic Kingdoms, as a playable character to unlock for a limited time.

King Triton appears in the live-action film, portrayed by Javier Bardem. In this version, like the stage musical, Triton is Ursula's brother. In addition, he is depicted as being less grumpy, though still having distaste for humans after his wife was killed by one.

King Triton also appears prominently in books that have been written by authors based on the film. In Part of Your World, a part of the A Twisted Tale series and written by author Liz Braswell, Triton is kidnapped and held by Ursula for a much longer time following Ariel's defeat and her installment as Queen of Atlantica. Towards the end of the book, Triton is freed and resumes his position as ruler, while Ariel becomes an ambassador between the land and the sea to be with Eric.

King Triton plays a prominent role in Poor Unfortunate Souls: A Tale of the Sea Witch, the third volume in the Villains series by Serena Valentino. In the book, Triton reveals himself to Ursula after she had been living among the humans of Ipswich and took revenge on them for the death of her adoptive father. Rather than being a loving and accepting brother, Triton forces her to take the form of a mermaid at court, rather than her true tentacled form. It is eventually revealed that Triton sought her out only to prove that she was dead so he could take the throne. Triton banishes Ursula to the depths of the oceans, where she cannot touch his kingdom.

King Triton also appears in the Lego animated special Lego Disney Princess: The Castle Quest, where he is trapped in a giant fish tank by Gaston.

=== Ariel's sisters ===
Attina, Alana, Adella, Aquata, Arista and Andrina
- First appearance: The Little Mermaid (1989)
- Created by: Ron Clements & John Musker
- Based on: The Sea King's daughters from "The Little Mermaid" by Hans Christian Andersen
- Voiced by: Full list
- Alias: Mersisters
- Family: King Triton (father); Queen Athena (mother; deceased); Ariel (sister)
- Relatives: Eric (brother-in-law); Melody (niece)

Attina, Alana, Adella, Aquata, Arista and Andrina are Ariel's older sisters. In the 1989 film, they perform the song "Daughters of Triton". They later notice a change in Ariel's mood and conclude that she is in love. All six sisters appear again in the end of the film together with Triton, smiling and waving to Ariel after she marries Eric.

In the second film, the sisters play a minor role, with only Attina, Andrina, Aquata and Adella having dialogue. In the prequel film, the six sisters play a major role in the plot.

Attina and Andrina also appear in Kingdom Hearts II.

In the 2023 live-action remake, Ariel's sisters have diverse ethnicities and are renamed as Perla (portrayed by Lorena Andrea), Indira (Simone Ashley), Karina (Kajsa Mohammar), Caspia (Nathalie Sorrell), Mala (Karolina Conchet) and Tamika (Sienna King).

==== Voice actors ====
- Attina:
  - Caroline Vasicek (first film)
  - Kath Soucie (TV series)
  - Christie Houser (Kingdom Hearts II)
  - Kari Wahlgren (Ariel's Beginning)
- Alana:
  - Kimmy Robertson (first film and TV series)
  - Jennifer Hale (Ariel's Beginning)
- Adella:
  - Kimmy Robertson (first film)
  - Sherry Lynn (TV series)
  - Tara Strong (Ariel's Beginning)
- Aquata:
  - Caroline Vasicek (first film)
  - Mona Marshall (TV series)
  - Grey DeLisle (Ariel's Beginning)
- Arista:
  - Kimmy Robertson (first film)
  - Mary Kay Bergman (TV series)
  - Grey DeLisle (Ariel's Beginning)
- Andrina:
  - Kimmy Robertson (first film)
  - Catherine Cavadini (TV series)
  - Susan Stevens Logan (Kingdom Hearts II)
  - Tara Strong (Ariel's Beginning)

=== Glut ===
Glut is a ferocious great white shark who is the opening antagonist of the film. He first appears where Ariel and Flounder are exploring the Sunken Ship and collecting human artifacts. He pursues them and tries to kill them, but gets his head stuck in an anchor and does not appear again.

In an original draft for the movie, Glut managed to survive and escape from his predicament and would fight Ariel and Flounder again while they are chasing the wedding ship to stop Eric and "Vanessa"'s wedding. Flounder musters up the strength and courage to trick Glut into getting Ariel close enough to the ship for her to get up onto it and then he manages to bite the barrel she was on (which is later revealed to be a gunpowder keg) as Flounder manages to escape from the results. It is implied that Glut died in the ensuing explosion. Glut's death in this scrapped scene may have been a reference to the climax of the original Jaws film. However, besides trying to simplify the story and focus the climax of the film on Ursula, gunpowder needs a very strong heat source to explode. So, realistically (physically and chemically), it would have been impossible for the barrel to explode by simply biting it, even less possible if surrounded by water and with wet shark teeth.

He makes minor appearances in the television series and also appears as a boss in Kingdom Hearts, initially as an optional boss, but must be defeated later to enter Ursula's lair.

Glut appears in the 2023 live-action remake portrayed through CGI. Like the original animated film, he does not speak and still serves as the film's opening antagonist. He is first seen when Ariel and Flounder are exploring a sunken ship, much to Flounder's worry that King Triton will not be pleased for not being present during the meeting. When Glut sees them, he chases Ariel and Flounder across the sunken ship. Flounder tries to escape, but ends up getting caught on the seafloor below, leaving him unable to swim while Ariel drops a barrel onto Glut, causing him to charge towards her, only to crash through a mirror and get stuck. Glut does not appear again afterwards, and his fate is left unknown.

=== Flotsam and Jetsam ===
Flotsam and Jetsam
- First appearance: The Little Mermaid (1989)
- Created by: Ron Clements & John Musker
- Portrayed by: Felix Rivera and Jamie Barcelon (2011 Broadway)
- Voiced by: Paddi Edwards (original); Corey Burton (Kingdom Hearts series and Disney parks)

Flotsam and Jetsam are minions of Ursula.

They are green morays which are identical and only able to be told apart by their eyes; Flotsam has a left white eye and a yellow right eye, while Jetsam has a yellow left eye and a right white eye. When their white eyes combine, it forms a portal that lets Ursula see what they are seeing from her lair. They are tasked with following Ariel and reporting her actions back to Ursula, eventually manipulating Ariel into visiting Ursula to attain human legs. In the climax, they are inadvertently killed by Ursula when she shoots them with a fatal energy blast from King Triton's trident that Ariel redirected from Eric.

Flotsam and Jetsam appear in the prequel television series alongside Ursula. They also appear in the Broadway stage musical, where the roles were originated by Tyler Maynard and Derrick Baskin. The eels also appear as puppets in The Little Mermaid Live!.

Flotsam and Jetsam appear in CGI form in the 2023 live-action film, in which they do not speak. They also appear to be hybridized with electric eels, as they can generate electricity.

=== Grimsby ===
Grimsby
- First appearance: The Little Mermaid (1989)
- Portrayed by: Dominique Kelley (The Little Mermaid Live!); Art Malik (live-action film)
- Voiced by: Ben Wright (1989 film); Kay E. Kuter (TV series, The Little Mermaid II: Return to the Sea)

In-universe information
- Alias: Grim
- Title: Sir

Grimsby is Eric's majordomo and confidant. In the opening scene, Grimsby is shown as not having the stomach for the sea, and dismisses the sailors' stories about merpeople living under the sea. He reveals that he worries for Eric, and has been hoping that the prince will settle down with the right girl. For Eric's birthday, Grimsby presents a statue he had commissioned of Eric in a dramatic pose, which he is proud of despite Eric and Max disapproving of it. Later, when Ariel has become human, Grimsby grows fond of her and encourages Eric to give up his dream girl for one "of flesh and blood".

Grimsby appears in some scenes in the sequel.

In the 2007 stage musical adaptation, Grimsby says that the reason he wants Eric to marry is because he had made a promise to Eric's late father to ensure it. Though Grimsby is reluctant to believe Eric's story of being saved from drowning by a girl, he comes up with the idea of holding a contest in which the princesses of the land are to sing for Eric, in the hopes that one of them will be the right girl. In the stage musical, the role is originated by Jonathan Freeman.

Grimsby also appears in The Little Mermaid Live!, and in the 2023 live-action remake of the film. In the latter, not only is he portrayed as Eric's confidant, but also prime minister of Queen Selina's kingdom, and acts as a father figure to him.

=== Max ===
Max is an Old English Sheepdog and Eric's pet. Unlike all the other animals in the film, Max is minimally anthropomorphic and does not speak human language. Max's barking and growling is provided by Frank Welker throughout his animated incarnations.

During Eric's birthday celebration, Max catches Ariel's scent and tracks her down, licking her on the cheek in an apparent show of affection. When the ship catches fire, the sailors escape safely, but Max is left behind. Seeing this, Eric dives out of his lifeboat and climbs back on board, grabbing Max and tossing him to safety. Later, when Eric is brought to shore safely by Ariel, Max smells out his master and rushes out to greet him. Max is also able to smell Ariel, who is hidden off-shore behind rocks, but Eric does not understand his barking. After Ariel has made her deal with Ursula and is brought to shore as a human, Max leads Eric to her, recognizing her as the same person, though Eric cannot. Eventually, Ursula appears in the guise of a human girl named Vanessa to distract Eric from kissing Ariel before the third day is up. Max is the only character in the human world who can sense Vanessa's true self and growls furiously at her during her and Eric's wedding, only for her to kick him in the face. When Scuttle and the sea animals try to stop the wedding, Max assists by biting Vanessa's rear, allowing Scuttle to break the conch shell containing Ariel's voice.

Max makes a few appearances in the prequel television series and the direct-to-video sequel, and is the only named character of the original film other than Vanessa who does not appear in the 2007 stage musical.

Max appears in The Little Mermaid Live!, portrayed by Bagel the sheepdog, and in the 2023 live-action film.

=== Chef Louis ===
Louis is the chef in Eric's castle, voiced by René Auberjonois. His accent implies that he is French, and he performs the song "Les Poissons" in which he cooks seafood in the castle kitchen. According to Carlotta the house maid, Louis' specialty is stuffed crab, which puts him at odds with Sebastian, who accidentally ends up in his kitchen and tries to escape. This rivalry is extended to the wedding in the finale, where Louis again chases Sebastian in an attempt to cut him up, and the sequel The Little Mermaid II: Return to the Sea.

Louis also stars in one episode of Disney's Marsupilami and Raw Toonage as a noise hating hotel guest with his victim, Sebastian as the hotel manager. Louis also makes an appearance in the episode "Ariel's Treasures" of the prequel TV series, where he accidentally steps on a whisk called a "whirly twirly" by Ariel and it slips into the water when he is making recipes.

In the 2007 stage musical, Louis is head of a group of chefs that work in Eric's castle. He performs the song "Les Poissons" from the original movie. A reprise is performed by Louis and the other chefs as they present their fish masterpieces to Ariel, Eric, and Grimsby. The role was originated by John Treacy Egan.

Chef Louis appears in The Little Mermaid Live!, portrayed by John Stamos. He does not appear in the 2023 live-action remake of the original film.

=== Carlotta ===
Carlotta (voiced by Edie McClurg) works in Eric's castle in a role suggested to be similar to a housekeeper, though it is not stated outright. She reappears in the sequel, apparently continuing her role after Eric and Ariel are married and have a daughter of their own.

In the 2007 stage musical, Carlotta develops an affectionate maternal relationship with Ariel. Carlotta sings in the musical number "Beyond My Wildest Dreams", where she berates the other servants who gossip about Ariel. Near the end of the musical, there is a contest where the princesses of the land are to sing for Eric, in the hope that one of them will have the voice of the girl who saved his life. The role is originated by Heidi Blickenstaff.

She is renamed as Lashana in the 2023 live-action film, portrayed by Martina Laird.

=== Seahorse ===
The Seahorse (voiced by Will Ryan in the film and Charlie Adler in the TV series) is King Triton's herald, master-of-ceremonies, and messenger.

== Introduced in the television series ==
=== Urchin ===
Urchin (voiced by Danny Cooksey) is an orphaned merboy with an olive-green tail and a recurring character of the prequel television series, in which he is a close friend of Ariel, Sebastian and Flounder, and often goes on adventures with them.

In the series, Urchin is seen to be an orphan who lives by himself and seek to have friends. He is approached by minor villains Lobster Mobster and Da Shrimp, who recruit him into their gang and have him to steal food for them. Urchin manages to steal food from the palace, but is confronted by Ariel, who tries to befriend Urchin, though he rebuffs her. Urchin shows his true colors when he helps Ariel escape after she is kidnapped by Lobster Mobster and Da Shrimp and stops Crab Louie from stealing from the royal treasury. This earns him a kiss from Ariel, and they become friends when Urchin follows Ariel's advice and apologizes to King Triton for his behavior.

In the episode "Trident True", Urchin plays pranks on Ariel's sisters Arista, Attina, Andrina, and Adella and buys a Father's Day present for King Triton, implying his closeness with the royal family, and Ariel's sisters admit that they see him as a little brother.

=== Gabriella ===
Gabriella is one of Ariel's friends. She is a mute mermaid with a pink tail and matching shells who communicates with sign language. In Gabriella's first appearance, before she meets Ariel, she sees her singing the first part of a song called "Daring to Dance" and sees her twirling about a music box with a figure of a ballerina on top of it. Ariel stops upon seeing her, but Gabriella encourages her to continue, wishing to sing as beautifully as Ariel, and identifies with Ariel's desire to dance. She decides to journey with Ariel to visit the Magical Wishing Starfish, passing through many dangers along the way. She is saddened when the Magical Wishing Starfish proves to be a fraud, but Ariel reassures her that she can express her feelings just as well through sign language. She joins Ariel in the second part of "Daring to Dance".

In Gabriella's second appearance, she returns to Atlantica for a visit. She and Ariel gush over Ariel's new additions to her collection of human objects, as well as the music box that Ariel found when they first met. Unbeknownst to either of them, Ursula has launched another scheme to take over Atlantica, this time casting a spell that causes Ariel's treasures to come to life and terrorize people. She is confused and shocked by this, but works with Ariel to break Ursula's spell.

The character was added to the series in its second season and was named after Gabriella Angelina Bommino, a fan of the film who watched it repeatedly while under treatment at the San Diego Children's Hospital, and died of leukemia during the run of the first season, on November 17, 1992. The character design was based on photographs of her.

==== Ollie ====
Ollie (voiced by Whitby Hertford) is a blue vocal octopus who is Gabriella's close friend and interpreter. He has spots on the sides of his head and a patch on his left eye. In his first appearance, he is shown with Gabriella, watching Ariel sing. After Ariel notices them, he explains Gabriella's disability and introduces himself. He is also the one to tell the tale of the Magical Wishing Starfish, and he accompanies them along the way. In his second appearance, he is visiting Atlantica with Gabriella and helps her stop Ursula's plot to take over the kingdom.

=== Pearl ===
Pearl (voiced by Cree Summer) is a fun-loving mermaid with a blue tail and matching shells who is familiar with Ariel and Alana. She is blonde, with a blue tail and blue, ruffle-edged shells. She makes her first appearance in the episode "Red" at a party held by Ariel, arriving with a crowd of friends on "squid-cycles". She is apparently popular and seems friendly, though snobbish. After she comments that the party is a bit dull, Ariel requests that the live band play louder, against her father's instructions, and Pearl leaves with the other guests when Triton puts a halt to the party.

In her second appearance in the episode "Eel-ectric City", she shows up at the palace to pick up Alana, who has been invited to a party at her house. Ariel is shocked and impressed when Pearl comments that her parents allow her to do as she pleases, and is invited to join them. As they are leaving, Pearl spies Triton's new chariot and coerces Ariel into driving the three mermaids in it while she gives directions. However, they are not heading for Pearl's house; they are instead going to Eel-ectric City, a party town reminiscent of Las Vegas, where Pearl is going to meet her friends. Upon arriving, they have fun until a gang known as the "Orange Roughies" led by Big Barracuda show up and Pearl taunts them, challenging them to a chariot race. Ariel and Alana try to reason with Pearl, but she wants to see the race through to the end. They start the race, but quickly lose control of the chariot in the rush of the arctic current, only saved through Ariel's quick thinking and the timely appearance of Triton. Pearl is shocked that her parents bothered coming, but happy that they cared about her, and her mother decides to keep a closer eye on her.

=== Spot ===
Spot (vocal effects provided by Frank Welker) is a fun-loving orca whale calf named after the single white spot birthmarked on his tail. In the episode "Whale of a Tale", when the human poachers approach, he frightenedly swims away from his real family until Ariel encounters him and cares for him until she lets him go to be with his real family. He returns in "Save the Whale" as a grown-up whale and, as Sebastian announces him, excitedly begins to perform for the citizens of Atlantica until he gets caught.

=== Dudley ===
Dudley (voiced by Dave Coulier) is an elderly sea turtle and assistant to King Triton. Dudley mumbles when he speaks and does not swim like other sea turtles in real life; instead he walks slowly along the sea floor like a land turtle and keeps important documents within his shell when he retracts his head. His conversation is always interrupted by his employer as he understands what the former is about to say.

=== Hans Christian Andersen ===
Hans Christian Andersen (voiced by Mark Hamill), is the author of the original Little Mermaid fairy tale. He appears in the episode "Metal Fish". Based on rumors he hears from other sailors about the existence of merfolk, he attempts to verify these claims by exploring the undersea world with the invention of his primitive submarine. While exploring the undersea world, his sub springs a leak and his steering controls are affected, causing his sub to lose control and eventually sink to the bottom. However, to his surprise he encounters Ariel and his claims are verified.

Later on, Archimedes, Sebastian, Flounder, The Crabscouts, and King Triton appear to assist Andersen's damaged vessel in getting back to the surface. At the end of this episode, Andersen is inspired by the encounter to "write" the story of The Little Mermaid. This encounter contradicts the idea that Ariel's first face-to-face contact with humans is with Prince Eric, and forces Ariel to confront her father with the fact that she, Triton, and all merfolk are half human when she appeals to Triton for help in saving Andersen's life.

=== Lobster Mobster and Da Shrimp ===
Lobster Mobster (voiced by Joe Alaskey) and Da Shrimp (voiced by David Lander) are a lobster and shrimp duo who are bumbling con-artists and recurring antagonists in the television series. They are modeled after stereotypes of gangsters from the 1920s.

=== Manta ===
Manta (voiced by Tim Curry) is a recurring villain in the TV series. Although his exact age is unknown, he appears to be potentially ageless, being referenced in a legend as nearly destroying Atlantica before imprisoned in an undersea volcano many years before the events of the series. The character is freed from an undersea volcano by a well-meaning Ariel, after which he becomes a recurring character, intent on taking control of Atlantica for himself. He later has a son, "Little Evil" (voiced by Bradley Pierce), who becomes a friend of Ariel's, resulting in his father's redemption.

=== Other characters ===
- Neptune (voiced by an unknown actor) is the late grandfather of Triton and the great-grandfather of Attina, Alana, Adella, Aquata, Arista, Andrina and Ariel. When Triton was young, Neptune would play the sea calliope every night at bedtime.
- Simon (voiced by Brian Cummings) is a sea dragon. After being imprisoned in a cave and looking to be rescued, Simon writes a message and puts it in a bottle, which Ariel, Sebastian, and Flounder find. They set out to save him and facve fdanger along the way before facing a giant sea dragon who turns out to be Simon himself, the writer of the message, who sought to have a party with new friends. Bringing Simon home to King Triton poses another challenge until Simon helps King Triton to save Atlantica and its merpeople from an invasion of evil sea anemones.
- Archimedes (voiced by Rod McKuen) is a merman scholar, explorer, and adventurer who is fascinated with humans, particularly human objects, and like Ariel, he wants to know as much about the human world as possible. Because of his fascination with humans, he is ostracized and disliked by his own people, as his only friend is Ariel. Because Archimedes goes to the surface very often, his knowledge on human culture is far more accurate than Ariel's, prior to the latter becoming human herself and her marriage to Eric. Due to Archimedes being ostracized by the merpeople, he lives in an abandoned sunken ship in the wilderness outside of Atlantica, where he keeps his collection of human objects. Initially, unlike Ariel, he has directly met humans and has even interacted with them.
- Moray (voiced by Dave Coulier) is an eel who works as a cave-to-cave salesman.
- The Sharkanians are a race of merfolk who are human-shark hybrids. They have often plotted to invade Atlantica.
  - Emperor Sharga (voiced by Jim Cummings impersonating Marlon Brando) is the ruler of the Sharkanians.
  - Commander Shaabala (voiced by Charlie Adler) is a Sharkanian that works under Sharga.
- Howling Hairfish (vocal effects provided by Jim Cummings) are monstrous fish, analogous to werewolves. Flounder is the only Howling Hairfish that can speak. To cure anyone who was bitten by a Howling Hairfish, one must expose them to the mist of a school of silver fish.
- Stormy is a wild giant seahorse. Ariel once tried to ride him despite her father's warnings in the series, after which he had to be released back into the wild, where he is much happier.
- Big Barracuda (voiced by Tino Insana) is the leader of the Orange Roughies, which consists of two other unnamed members.
- Zeus (voiced by Mark Hamill) is an athletic crab who was Sebastian's old rival.
- Dr. Vile (voiced by Kenneth Mars) is a mad scientist who does experiments on crabs.
- Flo (voiced by Kath Soucie) and Ebb (voiced by Jim Cummings) are two alligators who arrived in Altantica.
- Apollo (voiced by Ron Perlman) is a Merman who helped to fend off an Octopan invasion, with no one knowing that Apollo did it through dumb luck.
- The Octopans are Ursula's kind who once attacked Atlantica and are led by an unnamed leader (voiced by Clancy Brown).

== Introduced in The Little Mermaid II: Return to the Sea ==
=== Melody ===
Melody
- First appearance: The Little Mermaid II: Return to the Sea
- Created by: Elizabeth Anderson & Temple Mathews (screenplay)
- Voiced by: Tara Strong
- Family: Queen Ariel (mother); King Eric (father)
- Relatives: Princesses Attina, Alana, Adella, Aquata, Arista and Andrina (maternal aunts); King Triton (maternal grandfather); Queen Athena (maternal grandmother; deceased); Poseidon (great-grandfather); Crustacea (great-great-aunt); Neptune (great-great-grandfather)

Melody is the daughter of Eric and Ariel, the niece of Ariel's sisters, and the granddaughter of Eric's unnamed father, Queen Selina, adoptive; live-action sequel adaptation, King Triton and Queen Athena, Eric's human father and adoptive mother, and Ariel's mermaid family. She is also the princess and future queen of her father's kingdom.

The film opens to the celebration of Melody's birth and her being the first child born of both land and sea; her parents sail out to sea to present Melody to King Triton and the merfolk. As Triton gives her the locket, the celebration is interrupted by Morgana, who threatens to hurt Melody if Triton does not hand over the trident. Eric and Ariel manage to save Melody, but Morgana escapes. Ariel vows to keep all knowledge of the sea from Melody until Morgana is found.

By Melody's twelfth birthday, she has been regularly sneaking out of the palace to swim. She finds the locket and questions Ariel about it, causing an argument that, ends in Melody runs away from the castle in a boat, before Ariel can explain and apologize. Melody is discovered by Morgana's shark Undertow, who is currently transformed into a piranha, and convinced to meet Morgana, who uses Melody's love of the sea against her. She transforms Melody into a mermaid, promising that the transformation will be permanent if she retrieves the trident from Triton.

Melody succeeds in stealing the trident and gives it to Morgana, who subsequently traps her in a cave as the spell on Melody wears off, causing her to revert into a human and nearly drown. Melody sneaks up behind Morgana and stabs her with the trident, before giving it to Triton, who encases Morgana in ice.

In the wake of their victory, Triton offers Melody the option of becoming a mermaid permanently, but Melody declines. Instead, she decides to use the trident to destroy the wall that separates the sea from her home, reuniting the land and sea once again.

Melody performs one song in the film, "For a Moment", in which Ariel, voiced by Jodi Benson, also provides vocals.

Melody is also a playable character in the PlayStation game, The Little Mermaid II, based on the two film.

=== Morgana ===
Morgana
- First appearance: The Little Mermaid II: Return to the Sea (2000)
- Created by: Elizabeth Anderson & Temple Mathews (screenplay)
- Voiced by: Pat Carroll

In-universe information
- Species: Cecaelia; Half-human, half-octopus
- Gender: Female
- Title(s): The Sea Witch; Queen of Atlantica (temporarily)
- Occupation: Failed Sorceress
- Family: Ursula (older sister); Unnamed father (deceased); Unnamed mother (deceased)
- Pet(s): Undertow, Cloak and Dagger

Morgana is the younger, equally villainous sister of Ursula, who is bent on both avenging Ursula and proving to their late mother, who favoured Ursula, that she was wrong to underestimate her.

Morgana attacks Melody during her birth celebration and uses her as a hostage to gain Triton's trident. Morgana eventually meets a twelve-year-old Melody, who she tricks into retrieving the trident by saying that it belongs to her. After attaining the trident and proclaiming herself the new ruler of the seas, she tries to enslave Triton, Ariel and the rest of the merfolk. Melody manages to snatch back the trident and return it to Triton, who traps Morgana in a block of ice which sinks into the depths of the sea.

Due to Ursula's death in the original film, she does not appear in the sequel Return to the Sea. But Morgana has a picture of Ursula that she throws starfish at, and often mentions how Ursula was the favorite of their mother. Unlike Ursula, Morgana is bad at magic and thinner, with liver spots and longer thicker hair compared to Ursula's short hair, and tall and slender compared to Ursula being short and obese. She also has eight tentacles, unlike Ursula's six. Morgana had a song "Gonna Get My Wish", which was cut from the final film.

Morgana is the first antagonist in a Disney animated film to be the sibling of another Disney villain.

Morgana appears in the video games The Little Mermaid II: Return to the Sea Activity Center and The Little Mermaid II: Pinball Frenzy.

=== Undertow ===
Undertow
- First appearance: The Little Mermaid II: Return to the Sea
- Created by: Elizabeth Anderson & Temple Mathews (screenplay)
- Voiced by: Clancy Brown

Undertow is a main minion of Morgana.

He is a large purple and black tiger shark, who was transformed into a piranha by Triton while retaining his stripes and a big dorsal fin. Undertow convinces Melody to visit Morgana, who, upon attaining the trident, transforms him back into a tiger shark. In the climax, he becomes trapped in Morgana's lair and is killed when it collapses.

=== Cloak and Dagger ===
Cloak and Dagger
- First appearance: The Little Mermaid II: Return to the Sea
- Created by: Elizabeth Anderson & Temple Mathews (screenplay)
- Voiced by: Dee Bradley Baker

Cloak and Dagger are minions of Morgana.

They are dark blue manta rays. In the climax, Sebastian ties them to an icicle in Morgana's lair, trapping them, and they are killed when her lair collapses.

=== Tip and Dash ===
Tip and Dash
- First appearance: The Little Mermaid II: Return to the Sea
- Created by: Elizabeth Anderson & Temple Mathews (screenplay)
- Voiced by: Max Casella (Tip); Stephen Furst (Dash)

Tip and Dash are supporting characters in The Little Mermaid II: Return to the Sea and friends of Melody. Tip is an emperor penguin voiced by Max Casella, and Dash is a walrus voiced by Stephen Furst. Their names are derived from the convention of Morse Code, which uses dots (or "tips") and dashes to communicate messages. They are based on Timon and Pumbaa from Disney's The Lion King.

In the film, Tip and Dash are established odd couple best friends whom Melody encounters when she has been transformed into a mermaid. Tip and Dash join Melody on her journey to retrieve the trident for Morgana. In the final battle, both characters find their inner courage and help to save the day.

The duo perform the song "Tip and Dash" with Melody.

=== Ursula and Morgana's Mother ===
Ursula and Morgana's unnamed mother was a widowed witch, who loved Ursula more than Morgana. She is briefly mentioned in The Little Mermaid II, though her role is expanded in the Special Edition, as Morgana elaborates on her motives and backstory through the song "Gonna Get My Wish".

== Introduced in The Little Mermaid: Ariel's Beginning ==
=== Queen Athena ===
Athena
- First appearance: The Little Mermaid: Ariel's Beginning
- Voiced by: Lorelei Hill Butters (Speaking); Andrea Robinson (Singing)
- Spouse: King Triton
- Children: Ariel; Attina; Alana; Adella; Aquata; Arista; Andrina
- Relatives: Neptune (grandfather-in-law); Poseidon (father-in-law); Crustacea (aunt-in-law); Eric (son-in-law); Melody (granddaughter)

Athena was Triton's wife, queen of Atlantica, and the mother of Ariel, Aquata, Andrina, Arista, Attina, Adella and Alana. Her speaking voice is provided by Lorelei Hill Butters, and her singing voice is provided by Andrea Robinson. She appears in the opening prologue of the prequel, in which she is shown singing her and Triton's special song to the girls before bedtime. She is then seen relaxing in a cove on the ocean surface with her husband, children, and other merfolk. Triton gives her a music box that plays their song as an anniversary present before a pirate ship appears and attacks the merpeople, and Athena is crushed to death by the ship while trying to save the music box. Triton responds to this tragedy by banning music from Atlantica, with it being implied that her death caused Triton's prejudice towards humans. Prior to the film, Ariel's mother had been mentioned in the prequel television series, but had then remained nameless.

The character was reported to appear in the live-action film adaptation of The Little Mermaid, with the film also focusing on Ariel and her mother's relationship. The final film does not include Athena, but she is mentioned as having been killed by a human.

=== Marina Del Rey ===
Marina Del Rey
- First appearance: The Little Mermaid: Ariel's Beginning
- Voiced by: Sally Field

Marina Del Rey is a mermaid and the governess of King Triton's seven daughters, in charge of enforcing Triton's distant and formal parenting style, and is the main villainess. She feels she has been stuck as the governess for too long, and her primary motivation is to take over Sebastian's job as the king's attaché. She temporarily succeeds after getting Sebastian, Flounder, and their secret music band sent to prison after music is forbidden from Atlantica. Upon learning of the gang's escape with Ariel, Marina resolves to kill them by sending her electric eels after them. Marina is eventually caught, and Triton has her remanded to the dungeon for her crimes along with Benjamin. She is last seen in her cell with Benjamin as they do the conga.

=== Benjamin ===
Benjamin
- First appearance: The Little Mermaid: Ariel's Beginning
- Voiced by: Jeff Bennett

Benjamin is a light green manatee and Marina's sidekick. Unlike Marina, Benjamin loves Ariel and her sisters, and wishes that Marina would be nice. Following Marina's defeat, Benjamin is shown to have been remanded to the dungeon as he persuades Marina to join him in the conga.

=== Catfish Club Band ===
Ray-Ray, Cheeks, Ink Spot, and Shelbow
- First appearance: The Little Mermaid: Ariel's Beginning
- Voiced by: Kevin Michael Richardson as Ray-Ray and Cheeks; Rob Paulsen as Ink Spot; Jim Cummings as Shelbow

The Catfish Club Band are a quartet house band in the Catfish Club, the underground music club in Atlantica that exists in opposition to King Triton's ban on music. Their bandleader and vocalist is Sebastian, who also plays maracas.

Other members are:

- Ray-Ray - A sky-blue manta ray who plays the bass.
- Cheeks - A green blowfish who plays the saxophone.
- Ink Spot - A violet octopus who plays the piano.
- Shelbow - A teal sea turtle who plays the drums.

== Introduced in the live-action film ==
=== Queen Selina ===
Selina
- First appearance: The Little Mermaid (2023)
- Created by: David Magee (adaptation)
- Portrayed by: Noma Dumezweni

In-universe information
- Title: Queen
- Family: Eric (adopted son)

Queen Selina is the adoptive mother of Prince Eric and the ruler of a Caribbean island kingdom. She was created for the 2023 live-action film.
