= The Little Mermaid: Ariel's Beginning =

2008 animated Disney film directed by Peggy Holmes

- DVD cover
- Directed by: Peggy Holmes
- Screenplay by: Robert Reece; Evan Spiliotopoulos
- Story by: Jule Selbo; Jenny Wingfield
- Based on: The Little Mermaid by Hans Christian Andersen; Disney's The Little Mermaid by Walt Disney Animation Studios; Disney's The Little Mermaid by Walt Disney Animation Japan and Walt Disney Television
- Produced by: Kendra Halland
- Starring: Jodi Benson; Samuel E. Wright; Jim Cummings; Sally Field
- Edited by: John Royer
- Music by: James Dooley
- Production companies: Disneytoon Studios (Note: Animation outsourced to Toon City Animation.); Toon City Animation
- Distributed by: Walt Disney Studios Home Entertainment (Note: Released through the Walt Disney Pictures banner.)
- Release date: August 26, 2008
- Running time: 77 minutes
- Countries: Canada; Australia; United States; Philippines
- Language: English

The Little Mermaid: Ariel's Beginning (also known by the working title, The Little Mermaid III: Ariel's Beginning or The Little Mermaid 3: Ariel's Beginning) is a 2008 animated direct-to-video musical fantasy film produced by Disneytoon Studios, with the animation production being done by Toon City Animation, Inc. and DisneyToon Studios Australia. This film is the prequel to Disney's 1989 animated feature film The Little Mermaid, the third and final installment in The Little Mermaid animated trilogy, and the last direct-to-video sequel after John Lasseter took over as chairman for the Disney Animation Division. It is also the first in the chronology of the story running through the series, and it is based on the fairy tale The Little Mermaid by Hans Christian Andersen, but ignores the events of the The Little Mermaid animated television series which ran for three seasons.

Directed by Peggy Holmes, the film's main events are set a year before the events of the original film, when all music has been banned from the underwater kingdom of Atlantica by King Triton following the tragic death of his beloved wife. Years later, his spirited youngest daughter, Ariel, sets out to challenge her father’s decision and rediscovers the joy of music and love.

Jodi Benson and Samuel E. Wright (in his final film role) reprise their roles as Ariel and Sebastian respectively, while Sally Field voices the film's new villainess, Marina Del Rey. Jim Cummings takes over the role as King Triton, replacing Kenneth Mars.

The film was released by Walt Disney Studios Home Entertainment on August 26, 2008. Unlike most of Disney's Classics direct-to-video follow up films and its predecessor, the film received mixed reviews.

== Plot ==
King Triton and his wife, Queen Athena, rule over the underwater kingdom of Atlantica, filled with music and laughter. They have seven young daughters: Attina, Alana, Adella, Aquata, Arista, Andrina, and Ariel. One day, while the merpeople relax in a lagoon at the surface, King Triton gifts Queen Athena a music box. However, the merfolk flee at the approach of a pirate ship. Everyone escapes except Athena who, while trying to recover her music box, is killed when the ship crashes into the lagoon. Devastated by her death, Triton throws the music box away and bans music from Atlantica. He also bans any of his subjects from going to the surface again.

Ten years later, Ariel and her sisters live under a strict routine maintained by their governess, Marina Del Rey, and her kind hearted assistant, Benjamin the manatee. Marina hates being the girls' governess and longs to be King Triton's attaché, a job currently filled by Horatio Thelonious Ignacious Crustaceous Sebastian the crab. Ariel is equally frustrated by her and her sisters' dull lifestyle, which causes arguments with her father and drives a wedge between the two.

One day, Ariel befriends Flounder, a young tropical fish whom she later follows to an underground music club. She is overjoyed by the presence of music and is shocked when she sees Sebastian performing there. When her presence is revealed, the entire band stops playing and hides, believing Ariel will tell her father about them. Instead, Ariel is moved by her mother’s memory and sings I Remember, recalling the joy that filled her family’s life when music was a part of the kingdom. She is accepted as a member of the club after swearing an oath of secrecy.

Ariel returns to the palace and her sisters confront her over her disappearance, she explains where she was and, the following night, all seven princesses go to the club and have fun. However, Marina follows them, discovers the club and later reveals its existence to an angry King Triton, who destroys the club. He imprisons Sebastian, Flounder, and the band and assigns Marina to take over Sebastian's duties while Ariel and her sisters are confined to the palace as punishment for their disobedience, but she gets into an argument again with her father, who losing his temper and saying that he will not have music in his kingdom, which horrifies Ariel.

Unable to live in the kingdom without music any further, Ariel decides to runs away from the palace and frees her friends from jail. Although initially against the idea, Sebastian leads them to a deserted place far away from the palace where Ariel discovers her mother's music box, as Sebastian hoped. Ariel realizes her father has forgotten how to feel happy since Athena's death and decides to bring the music box back to him, hoping it will remind him. Meanwhile, Attina informs Triton that Ariel and Sebastian have run away and he orders his guards to find them. Knowing that Triton is regretting his hasty dismissal of Sebastian and desperate to hold onto her newfound power, an enraged Marina releases her electric eels to hunt down and kill Ariel and Sebastian.

Ariel and the band are confronted by the eels on their way back, but Flounder defeats them. Sebastian and Marina fight, but she is apparently defeated when he traps her in a coral tube. However, just as King Triton arrives, Ariel notices Marina barreling towards an unaware Sebastian, intent on killing him. Triton watches in horror as Ariel rushes to protect Sebastian and takes a very hard hit, knocking her unconscious as she falls to the sea floor. As Triton dives down and holds Ariel, he blames himself for the lack of joy in the kingdom; upon hearing the music box play, he sings to Ariel, who revives. Triton apologizes and the two reconcile.

Following this, King Triton lifts his decade-long banishment of music and welcomes it back into his kingdom, much to everyone's delight. Sebastian is reinstated as right hand to the King, as well as appointed as Atlantica's first official Court Composer. Marina is imprisoned in the dungeon for her crimes, Benjamin becomes a prison psychologist, and Ariel shares a dance with her father.

== Voice cast ==
- Jodi Benson as Ariel, an independent, headstrong and determined young mermaid. She is the youngest and prettiest princess of the sea but spends most of her time outside the palace walls of Atlantica singing, daydreaming, and adventuring.
- Jim Cummings as King Triton, Ariel's strict and overprotective father and the ruler of Atlantica who is prejudiced towards humans. He replaces Kenneth Mars, who was unavailable to reprise his role due to battling cancer at the time. Now with Mars' passing in 2011, Cummings became the current voice of Triton.
  - Jim Cummings also voices Shelbow, a member of the Catfish Club Band.
- Samuel E. Wright as Sebastian, a red Caribbean crab with a Jamaican accent who serves as King Triton's advisor and court composer. This was Wright's final film role before his retirement in 2008 until his death from prostate cancer in 2021.
- Parker Goris as Flounder, a yellow tropical fish who is Ariel's best friend.
- Sally Field as Marina Del Rey.
- Kari Wahlgren as Attina, the eldest sister who keeps the others in order and is always following her father's words.
- Tara Strong (previously the voice of Melody, the daughter of Ariel, in Return to the Sea) as:
  - Adella, the third eldest sister who dreams of falling in love with a boy named Stevie.
  - Andrina, the second youngest sister who is sarcastic and likes to joke around.
- Jennifer Hale as Alana, the second eldest sister who is interested in beauty, fashion and is very cautious with her appearance.
- Grey DeLisle as:
  - Aquata, the middle sister who is tough, but shy and can't dance.
  - Arista, the third youngest sister who is very quirky and often "borrows" other people's things. She joins the band at the end of the movie.
- Jeff Bennett as Benjamin, Marina's mild-mannered manatee sidekick.
  - Bennett also voices the Swordfish Guards who patrol the palace.
- Lorelei Hill Butters as Queen Athena
  - Andrea Robinson as Queen Athena's singing voice
- Rob Paulsen (previously the voice of Prince Eric in Return to the Sea) as Ink Spot and Swifty, members of the Catfish Club Band.
- Kevin Michael Richardson as Cheeks and Ray-Ray, members of the Catfish Club Band.

== Production ==
The film's working title was The Little Mermaid III, and it was originally scheduled for a mid-2007 release. When John Lasseter took over Disney Animation, more resources were spent on completing Cinderella III: A Twist in Time, and attention only returned to Ariel's Beginning in July 2006 after the wrap-up of Cinderella III.

A teaser trailer and musical preview of the film (an alternate version of "Jump in the Line") were attached to the Platinum Edition DVD of The Little Mermaid, which was released in October 2006. At the time, the working title The Little Mermaid III was still being used.

Like The Little Mermaid II: Return to the Sea, this film uses digital ink and paint with the use of the Toon Boom Harmony software.

== Soundtrack ==
The score to the film was composed by James Dooley, who recorded the score with a 72-piece ensemble of the Hollywood Studio Symphony, as well as a big band, at the Sony Scoring Stage. The film features new songs written by Jeanine Tesori, along with covers of previously recorded calypso songs that were arranged by Dooley. No soundtrack has been released yet for the film.

No.	Title	Performer(s)	Length
1.	"Athena's Song (Endless Sky)"	Andrea Robinson
2.	"Just One Mistake"	Sally Field
3.	"Jump in the Line"	Samuel E. Wright & Chorus
4.	"Jump in the Line (Reprise)"	Jodi Benson, Parker Goris, Samuel E. Wright & Chorus
5.	"I Remember"	Jodi Benson
6.	"Man Smart (Woman Smarter)"
7.	"Just One Mistake (Reprise)"	Sally Field
8.	"I Will Sing"	Jeannette Bayardelle

== Release ==
The film was released on Region 1 DVD in the United States on August 26, 2008, and on Region 2 DVD in the United Kingdom and Europe on September 22, 2008. The DVD contains special features including deleted scenes, a production featurette hosted by the director, games and activities, and a featurette hosted by Sierra Boggess (who played Ariel on Broadway) about the Broadway musical.

On December 16, 2008, the film was released in a "The Little Mermaid Trilogy" boxed set that includes The Little Mermaid (Platinum Edition) and The Little Mermaid II: Return to the Sea. On November 19, 2013, it was released on Blu-ray as a 2-movie collection alongside the sequel.

In 2019, the film was released on Disney+.

=== Censorship in the United Kingdom ===
In the United Kingdom, the word "spastic" was cut from an interactive game in the extra features of the DVD and Blu-Ray releases by the BBFC to achieve a "U" rating. An uncut version was available rated "12".

The word appears uncensored in all versions of the full-length feature.

== Reception ==
On the review aggregate website Rotten Tomatoes, 33% of 6 critic reviews are positive. The new villain, Marina Del Rey, was criticized as a poor follow-up to Ursula. The animation quality of the film has been praised as being "impressive" for a direct-to-video and comparable to that of the original film. A mildly negative review has described that in the film "goofiness often gets buried too often underneath a blah story that's much too run-of-the-mill to allow the emotional oomph of the characters' plights to truly impact". The music has also been criticized as being unmemorable, with one review stating that "to label this a musical would be false advertising".
