= Sebastian: Party Gras! =

Studio album by Samuel E. Wright (as Sebastian)
- Released: October 1991
- Recorded: 1990–1991
- Studio: Manzanita Recording, Arrington, TN, The Hit Factory, NYC, Recording Arts, Nashville
- Genre: Calypso, reggae
- Length: 43:03
- Label: Walt Disney
- Producer: Shepard Stern

Samuel E. Wright (as Sebastian) chronology
Sebastian from The Little Mermaid (1990)	Sebastian: Party Gras! (1991)	The Little Mermaid: Songs from the Sea (1992)

Professional ratings
Review scores
Source	Rating
Allmusic	4.5/5 stars

Sebastian: Party Gras! is the second of three original albums inspired by Disney's The Little Mermaid film. Many of the songs are cover versions of classic calypso and reggae songs and other songs recorded in calypso and reggae styles. All of the songs are performed by Samuel E. Wright as Sebastian the crab.

== Track listing ==
No.	Title	Writer(s)	Length
1.	"Sing Along"	Alphonsus Cassell	4:54
2.	"Iko Iko"	Barbara Anne Hawkins, Joan Marie Johnson, Jesse Thomas, Maralyn Jones, Joe Jones, Rose Lee Hawkins, Sharon Jones	3:52
3.	"Limbo Rock"	Jon Sheldon, Billy Strange	2:32
4.	"Carousel"	Lawrence Dermer, Joe Galdo, Rafael Vigil	4:07
5.	"I'm a Crustacean"	Shepard Stern, Jack Cuffari	3:03
6.	"Octopus's Garden"	Ringo Starr	2:50
7.	"Give a Little Love"	Albert Hammond, Diane Warren	4:01
8.	"In De Congaline"	Alan Sheppard, Dean Straker	3:11
9.	"Twist and Shout"	Phil Medley, Bert Russell	3:11
10.	"Coconut"	Harry Nilsson	3:44
11.	"Life Is a Magic Thing"	Barry Reynolds, Anijia Shockley	4:05
12.	"What a Wonderful World"	Bob Thiele, George David Weiss	4:05
Total length:			43:03

== Personnel ==
Credits for Sebastian: Party Gras! adapted from album liner notes.

- Terry Bates - assistant engineer
- Andy Grassi - assistant engineer
- Joe Pirrera - assistant engineer
- Willie Pevear - engineer, mixing
- Bruce Botnick - mastering
- Harold J. Kleiner - executive producer
- Eric Silver - associate producer
- Shepard Stern - producer
- Thomas Cain - backing vocals
- Erin Dorris - backing vocals
- Ricky Dorris - backing vocals
- Tionna Dorris - backing vocals
- Kim Fleming - backing vocals
- Vicki Hampton - backing vocals
- Shannon Holland - backing vocals
- Donna McElroy - backing vocals
- Michael Mishaw - backing vocals
- Tiffany Sims - backing vocals
- Tomeka Sims - backing vocals
- Kenneth "Scat" Springs - backing vocals
- Victor Wooten, Michael Rhodes - bass
- Larry Chaney - guitars
- Jeff Roach - synthesizers, programming
- Dale Armstrong - drums
- Bill Cuomo - keys
- The "No Clams" Horns - horns
