= The Little Mermaid: Splash Hits =

Compilation album by various artists
- Released: Q1 1993
- Recorded: 1992
- Studios: Battery Sound; The Hit Factory; Sear Sound; Studio Sound Recorders; MCA Music Media
- Genre: Pop
- Length: 30:34
- Label: Walt Disney
- Producers: Harold J. Kleiner; Michael Becker

The Little Mermaid: Splash Hits is a compilation album, which mostly contained songs from The Little Mermaid TV series.

== Track list ==
No.	Title	Writer(s)	Performer(s)	Length
1.	"In Harmony"	Michael and Patty Silversher	Jodi Benson	2:00
2.	"You Got to Be You"	Jack Feldman, Tom Snow	Samuel E. Wright	2:30
3.	"Sing a New Song"	Randy Petersen, Kevin Quinn	Jodi Benson, Brian Cummings	1:39
4.	"Just a Little Love"	Jack Feldman, Tom Snow	Jodi Benson	2:17
5.	"Sea Floor Strut" (*)	Dave Kinnoin, Jimmy Hammer	Samuel E. Wright, Shelby Daniel, Angie Jaree, Janis Liebhart	3:18
6.	"Beddie-Bye Blues"	Randy Petersen, Kevin Quinn	Joe Alaskey, David Lander	1:48
7.	"Please Don't Wake the Whale" (*)	Dennis Scott	Jodi Benson, Shelby Daniel, Angie Jaree, Janis Liebhart	2:09
8.	"Reef with a View" (*)	Rick Dempsey, Joel Jacks	Randy Crenshaw	2:37
9.	"The Lobster Mobster's Mob"	Ted Anasti, Patsy Cameron, Michael Silversher	Joe Alaskey, David Lander	1:19
10.	"Dis is de Life"	Michael and Patty Silversher	Samuel E. Wright	3:24
11.	"The Edge of the Edge of the Sea"	Michael and Patty Silversher	Jodi Benson	1:39
12.	"In My Blue Backyard" (*)	William Robinson	Jodi Benson	3:31
13.	"Home Is" (*)	Paul Parnes, Dennis Scott	Jodi Benson	2:23
Total length:				30:34

Note: *These tracks were written specifically for this album.

== Publishing ==
- Tracks 1–4, 7 and 9–11 © 1993 Wonderland Music Company, Inc. (BMI).
- Tracks 5–6 and 12–13 © 1993 Walt Disney Music Company, Inc. (ASCAP).
- Track 8 © 1993 Walt Disney Music Company, Inc. (ASCAP)/Wonderland Music Company, Inc. (BMI).
- International copyright secured for all tracks.

== Personnel ==
Credits for The Little Mermaid: Splash Hits adapted from album liner notes.

- Executive Producer: Harold J. Kleiner
- Associate Producers: Robin Frederick, Steve Gelfand, Robby Merkin and Bambi Moe
- Mixed by Michael Becker at Battery Sound and the Hit Factory
- Assistant Engineers: Pete Christensen, Rob Groome and Mike Thompson
- Mastered by Eric Dobson at MCA Music Media, Hollywood, CA
- Ariel vocals by Jodi Benson
- Sebastian vocals by Samuel E. Wright
- Lobster Mobster vocals by Joe Alaskey
- Da Shrimp vocals by David Lander
- Wayne the Newt vocals by Randy Crenshaw
- Simon the Sea Monster vocals by Brian Cummings
- Ariel's sisters vocals by Shelby Daniel, Angie Jaree and Janis Liebhart
- Art direction by Claudia Mielnik and Cyndee Whitney
- Illustrated by Michael Humphries
- Special thanks to Rick Dempsey of Disney Character Voices
- Tracks 1–4, 6 and 9–11 originally produced by Robby Merkin and Steve Gelfand, Executive Producer: Bambi Moe (except tracks 2 and 4), recorded by Steve Goldman
- Tracks 5, 7–8 and 12–13 recorded by Alan Hirshberg
