= Kenneth Mars =

American actor (1935–2011)

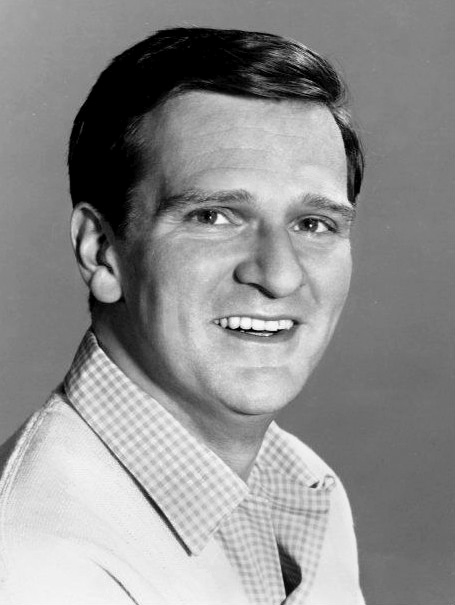
- Mars in 1967
- Born: April 4, 1935; Chicago, Illinois, U.S.
- Died: February 12, 2011 (aged 75); Granada Hills, California, U.S.
- Other name: Ken Mars
- Education: Northwestern University
- Occupation: Actor
- Years active: 1962–2008
- Spouse: Barbara Newborn (m. 1977)
- Children: 2

Kenneth Mars (April 4, 1935 – February 12, 2011) was an American actor. He appeared in two Mel Brooks films: as the deranged Nazi playwright Franz Liebkind in The Producers (1967) and Police Inspector Hans Wilhelm Friedrich Kemp in Young Frankenstein (1974). He also co-starred in Peter Bogdanovich's What's Up, Doc? (1972) as well as appearing in Woody Allen's Radio Days (1987) and Shadows and Fog (1991).

Mars appeared in two seasons of Malcolm in the Middle as Otto Mannkusser, Francis's well-meaning but dimwitted boss, a German immigrant who owns a dude ranch. He voiced roles such as King Triton in Disney’s The Little Mermaid Franchise, Littlefoot's grandfather Longneck in The Land Before Time series (1994–2008), Professor Screweyes in We're Back! A Dinosaur's Story (1993), King Colbert in Thumbelina (1994), and Tuskernini in Darkwing Duck (1991–1992). He voiced the Vault 13 Overseer in Interplay's Fallout. In 2001 he played Grace's Uncle Sid on Will and Grace.

== Early life ==
Mars was born in Chicago. His father, Bernard "Sonny" Mars, was a radio and television personality. Kenneth studied fine arts and acting at Northwestern University.

== Career ==
Mars made his acting debut in 1962 as a book publisher on Car 54, Where Are You?. He later appeared on such television series as Gunsmoke, Get Smart, McMillan & Wife, Columbo, Harry O, The Bob Crane Show, and Police Woman. He also appeared in dramatic roles such as Will Turner, a former FBI agent, in Warren Beatty's The Parallax View.

Mars played Harry Zarakartos on the Richard Benjamin-Paula Prentiss 1967 CBS-TV sitcom He & She. He was featured in several small roles in broadcasts such as the Misfits of Science pilot episode and the Star Trek: Deep Space Nine episode "Shadowplay". He was cast opposite Bette Davis in Hello Mother, Goodbye!, a 1973 television pilot aired by NBC but never picked up as a series. From 1970 to 1974, Mars guest starred in five episodes of Love, American Style, playing various characters.

In 1977, Mars became a series regular on both the Sha Na Na variety series and on Norman Lear's talk show parody Fernwood 2-Night in the recurring role of eccentric William W.D. 'Bud' Prize, from the Fernwood Chamber of Commerce, reprising the role on America 2-Night in 1978. In 2001, Mars portrayed a comedic famous but washed-up photographer on Just Shoot Me. Before his death, his final television roles were Otto, the German dude ranch owner on Fox's Malcolm in the Middle, an appearance on Disney Channel's Hannah Montana, and reprising his role as Grandpa Longneck in The Land Before Time television series.

In 1969, Mars portrayed a marshal trying to raise a posse to pursue Butch Cassidy and the Sundance Kid, only to have his address to the townsfolk hijacked by a friendly bicycle salesman. He frequently played characters with exaggerated accents, portraying German characters in The Producers (1967) and Young Frankenstein (1974) and a Croatian musicologist, Hugh Simon, in What's Up, Doc? (1972). His first broadly accented character was that of Sir Evelyn Oakleigh in the 1962 Off-Broadway revival of the Cole Porter musical Anything Goes. He also appeared in the 1962 Broadway play The Affair.

In 1975, ABC/Dunhill released a comedy LP produced by Earl Doud, Henry the First, featuring Mars in several comedy bits as Henry Kissinger, including a cover version of the Bachman–Turner Overdrive song, "Takin' Care of Business".

Mars also had a voice acting career, which began with voicing several characters on Uncle Croc's Block. In film, he voiced Ariel's father King Triton in The Little Mermaid and Littlefoot's grandfather Longneck in The Land Before Time franchise and its spin-off television series, as well as the villainous Professor Screweyes in We're Back! A Dinosaur's Story and Sweet William in Fievel's American Tails, sequel to An American Tail: Fievel Goes West. He had voice roles in various animated television series, such as The Smurfs, The Biskitts, A Pup Named Scooby-Doo, TaleSpin, and Ludwig van Beethoven in the Animaniacs episode sketch "Roll Over, Beethoven", as well as video games such as Fallout and Kingdom Hearts, in which he reprised his role as Triton. He also played various minor roles on the popular radio show, Adventures in Odyssey.

In 2008, Mars retired from acting after being diagnosed with pancreatic cancer two years prior. His final performance was as Grandpa Longneck in the animated television series The Land Before Time.

== Personal life ==
In 1977, Mars married Barbara Newborn. They had two daughters, and the marriage lasted until his death in 2011.

== Illness and death ==
In 2006, Mars was diagnosed with pancreatic cancer that had already spread beyond his pancreas. Due to the cancer, he was unable to reprise his role as Triton in The Little Mermaid: Ariel's Beginning, with Jim Cummings taking over the role, and Grandpa Longneck, his Land Before Time character, did not have a speaking role in the thirteenth film, The Wisdom of Friends. Mars died from cancer on February 12, 2011, at the age of 75.

== Filmography ==
=== Film ===
Year	Title	Role	Notes
1963	Act One	Robert E. Sherwood	
1967	The Producers	Franz Liebkind	
1969	The April Fools	Les Hopkins	
1969	Butch Cassidy and the Sundance Kid	Marshal	
1969	Viva Max!	Dr. Sam Gillison	
1971	Desperate Characters	Otto Bentwood	
1972	What's Up, Doc?	Hugh Simon	
1974	The Parallax View	Former FBI Agent Will	
1974	Young Frankenstein	Police Inspector Hans Wilhelm Friedrich Kemp	
1975	Night Moves	Nick	
1978	Goin' Coconuts	Kruse	
1979	The Apple Dumpling Gang Rides Again	Marshal Woolly Bill Hitchcock	
1981	Full Moon High	Coach Cleveland, Principal Cleveland	
1983	Yellowbeard	Mr. Crisp and Verdugo (dual role)	
1984	Prince Jack	Lyndon B. Johnson	
1984	Protocol	Lou	
1985	Fletch	Stanton Boyd	
1985	Beer	Adolphe Norbecker	
1986	The Adventures of the American Rabbit	Walt, Vultor the Buzzard	Voice
1987	Radio Days	Rabbi Baumel	
1988	For Keeps	Mr. Bobrucz	
1988	Illegally Yours	Hal B. Keeler	
1988	Rented Lips	Rev. Farrell	
1989	Police Academy 6: City Under Siege	The Mayor	
1989	The Little Mermaid	King Triton	Voice
1991	Shadows and Fog	Armstead the Magician	
1993	We're Back! A Dinosaur's Story	Professor Screweyes	Voice
1994	The Land Before Time II: The Great Valley Adventure	Grandpa Longneck	Voice, direct-to-video
1994	Thumbelina	King Colbert	Voice
1995	Rough Magic	Magician	
1995	The Land Before Time III: The Time of the Great Giving	Grandpa Longneck	Voice, direct-to-video
1996	Citizen Ruth	Dr. Charlie Rollins	
1996	The Land Before Time IV: Journey Through the Mists	Grandpa Longneck	Voice, direct-to-video
1996	Bruno the Kid: The Animated Movie	Professor Van Trapp	Voice, direct-to-video
1997	The Land Before Time V: The Mysterious Island	Grandpa Longneck	Voice, direct-to-video
1998	The Land Before Time VI: The Secret of Saurus Rock	Grandpa Longneck	Voice, direct-to-video
2000	The Little Mermaid II: Return to the Sea	King Triton	Voice, direct-to-video
2000	The Land Before Time VII: The Stone of Cold Fire	Grandpa Longneck	Voice, direct-to-video
2001	The Land Before Time VIII: The Big Freeze	Grandpa Longneck	Voice, direct-to-video
2002	The Land Before Time IX: Journey to Big Water	Grandpa Longneck	Voice, direct-to-video
2002	Teddy Bears' Picnic	Gene Molinari	
2003	The Land Before Time X: The Great Longneck Migration	Grandpa Longneck	Voice, direct-to-video
2005	The Land Before Time XI: Invasion of the Tinysauruses	Grandpa Longneck	Voice, direct-to-video
2006	The Land Before Time XII: The Great Day of the Flyers	Grandpa Longneck	Voice, direct-to-video

=== Television ===
Year	Title	Role	Notes
1967	Gunsmoke	Clyde Hayes	Episode: "The Returning"
1967–68	He & She	Harry Zarakartos	21 episodes
1968–70	The Ghost & Mrs. Muir	Joshua T. Albertson, Ellsworth Gordon	2 episodes
1973	Hawkins	Lester De Ville	Episode: "Murder in Movieland"
1973	Guess Who's Sleeping in My Bed?	Mitchell Bernard	Television film
1974	Hello Mother, Goodbye!		Television pilot
1975	Wonder Woman	Colonel Von Blasko	Episode: "The New Original Wonder Woman"
1975	It's a Bird...It's a Plane...It's Superman	Max Mencken	Television special
1977	Columbo	Mike	Episode: "The Bye-Bye Sky High I.Q. Murder Case"
1977	Fernwood 2 Night	William W.D. "Bud" Prize	8 episodes
1977	Baa Baa Black Sheep	Harold French	Episode: "Five the Hard Way"
1978	America 2-Night	William W.D. "Bud" Prize	3 episodes
1979	Carol Burnett & Company	Various	
1980	Hart to Hart	Dr. Cobb	Episode: "Murder Is a Man's Best Friend"
1981	The Facts of Life	Mr. Harris	Episode: "Gossip"
1981–89	The Smurfs	King Bullrush, additional voices	Voice, 21 episodes
1983	The Biskitts	Max, Fetch, Snarl	Voice
1983	The New Scooby Doo Mysteries	Orson Kane	Voice, episode: "The Hand of Horror"
1985	Misfits of Science	Sen. Donner	Episode: "Deep Freeze"
1987–90	DuckTales	Vulcan	Voice, 2 episodes
1988–91	A Pup Named Scooby-Doo	Mr. Trixenstuff, Ghost of McMuttmauler, additional voices	Voice, 14 episodes
1989	Get Smart, Again!	Cmdr. Drury	Television film
1989	The Further Adventures of SuperTed	Sleepless Knight	Voice, episode: "Sheepless Nights"
1990–91	TaleSpin	Heimlich Menudo, Buzz	Voice, 3 episodes
1990	227	Joe Bouvier	Episode: "Nightmare on 227"
1990	The Adventures of Don Coyote and Sancho Panda	Additional Voices	Episode: "Pity the Poor Pirate"
1990	Timeless Tales from Hallmark	Mr. Budgeknot	Episode: "Thumbelina"
1990	Garfield and Friends	Sherlock Holmes	Voice (as Ken Mars), episode: "Hound of the Arbuckles / U.S. Acres: Read Alert / Urban Arbuckle
1990	Tiny Toon Adventures	Flavio	Voice, episode: "Hollywood Plucky"
1990	Perfect Strangers	Alvin 'Ace' Atkins	Episode: "Call Me Indestructible"
1990	Shades of LA	Uncle Louis Burton	3 episodes
1990	Potsworth & Co	Greystone Giant	Voice, 13 episodes
1990	She'll Take Romance	Smokey	(as Ken Mars), Television film
1990	New Kids on the Block		(Voice, as Ken Mars), 14 episodes
1991	Bobby's World		(Voice, as Ken Mars), Episode: "Clubhouse Bobby"
1991	Darkwing Duck	Tuskernini	Voice, 6 episodes
1992	A Different World	Homeless Man	Episode: "Honeymoon in L.A.: Part 2"
1992	Captain Planet and the Planeteers	Moisha Lowkowitz	Voice, episode: "If It's Doomsday, This Must Be Belfast" Credited as Ken Mars
1992–94	The Little Mermaid	King Triton	Voice, 25 episodes
1992	Fievel's American Tails	Sweet William	Voice, 6 episodes
1993	The Pink Panther	The Commissioner	Voice, 5 episodes
1993	Bonkers	Gloomy	Voice, episode: "The Toon That Ate Hollywood"
1993	Animaniacs	Beethoven	Voice, episode: "Roll Over, Beethoven"
1993	Rugrats	Policeman	Voice, episode: "Party Animals"
1994	Star Trek: Deep Space Nine	Colyus	Episode: "Shadowplay"
1994–95	Batman: The Animated Series	M2, Richard	Voice, 2 episodes
1995	Diagnosis: Murder	Walter Carstairs	Episode: "How to Murder Your Lawyer"
1995	Freakazoid!	Dr. Gunter Hunterhanker	Voice, episode: "Candle Jack"
1996	Lois & Clark: The New Adventures of Superman	Grant Gendell	Episode : "Bob and Carol and Lois and Clark"
1996	The Real Adventures of Jonny Quest	Faust	Voice, episode: "The Alchemist"
1997	The Drew Carey Show	Mr. Tinsley	Episode: "Hello/Goodbye"
1997	The Naked Truth	Judge	Episode: "The Truth"
1997–98	Life with Louie	The Mayor, Priest, Rabbi, Doctor	Voice, 4 episodes
1997	Police Academy: The Series	Dr. Otis P. Quackenbush	Episode: "Les Is More"
1998	Godzilla: The Series	Dr. Alexander Preloran	Voice, episode: "Leviathan"
2001	Becker	Melvin Golar	3 episodes
2001	Just Shoot Me!	Horst	Episode: "Fanny Finch"
2001	The Legend of Tarzan	Uncle Bert/Gorilla Elder (voice)	Episode: "Tarzan and the Challenger"
2001	Will and Grace	Uncle Sid	2 episodes
2002	Good Morning, Miami	Marty	Episode: "Penny Wise, Jake Foolish
2002–04	Malcolm in the Middle	Otto Mannkusser	25 episodes
2004	Oliver Beene	Carl the Super	Episode: "Fallout"
2007	Hannah Montana	Gunter the Innkeeper	Episode: "School Bully"
2007–08	The Land Before Time	Grandpa Longneck	Voice, 9 episodes

=== Video games ===
Year	Title	Voice role
1995	Shannara	Leah Guard, King of the Silver River, Dwarf Leader
1997	Fallout	Vault 13 Overseer
2002	Kingdom Hearts	King Triton (final role)
2006	Kingdom Hearts II	King Triton (final role)

== Discography ==
- Henry the First (1974) - Henry Kissinger
