= Samuel E. Wright =

American actor (1946–2021)

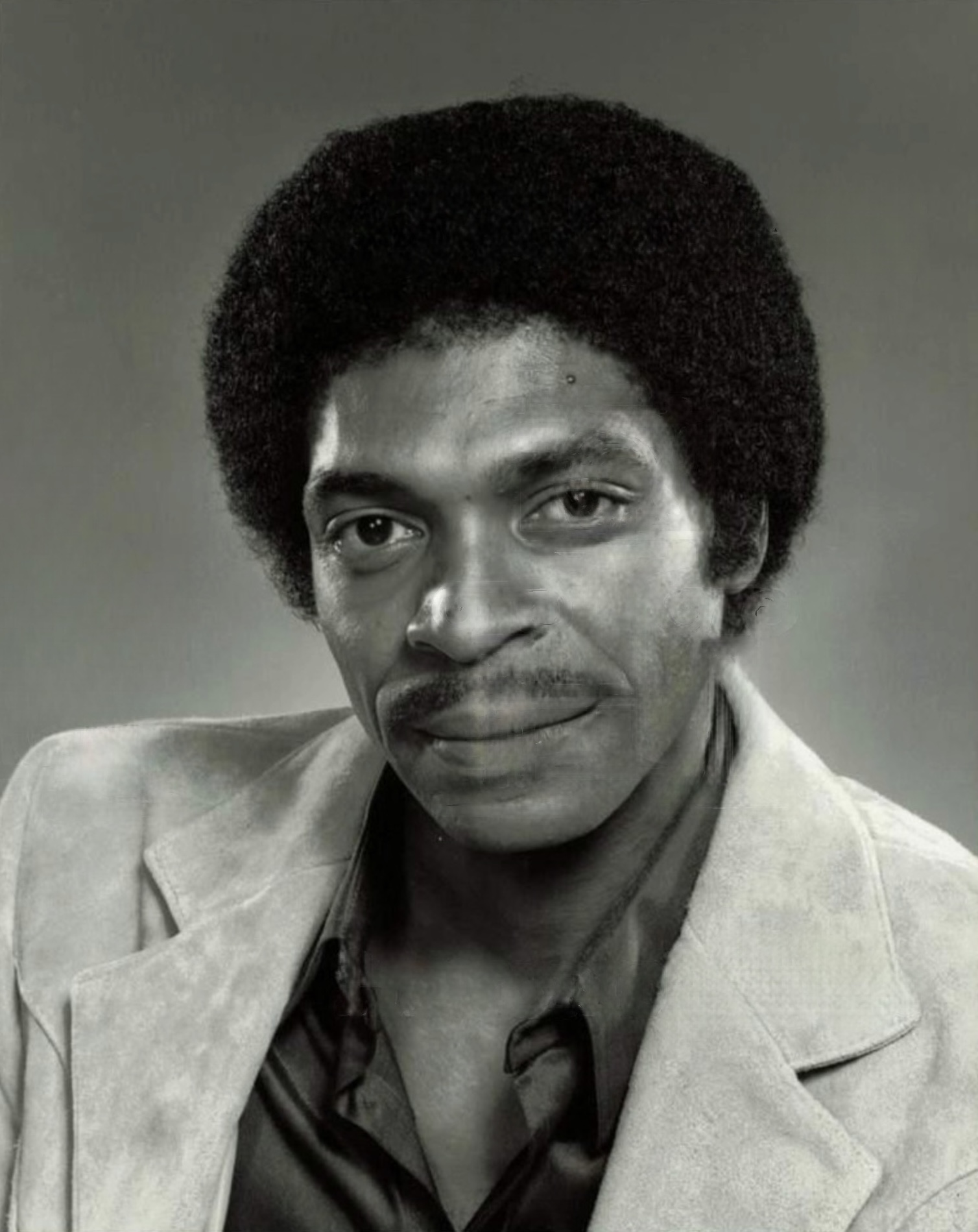
- Wright in Enos, 1981
- Born: Samuel Ernest Wright; November 20, 1946; Camden, South Carolina, U.S.
- Died: May 24, 2021 (aged 74); Walden, New York, U.S.
- Resting place: Wallkill Valley Cemetery, Walden, New York, U.S.
- Occupations: Actor; singer
- Years active: 1968–2008
- Spouse: Amanda Wright (m. 1974)
- Children: 3

Samuel Ernest Wright (November 20, 1946 – May 24, 2021) was an American actor. He was best known as the voice of Sebastian the Crab in Disney's The Little Mermaid, for which he provided the lead vocals to "Under the Sea", which won the Academy Award for Best Original Song. He played Dizzy Gillespie in Bird, the biographical film about Charlie Parker. Wright also played the part of Mufasa in the original cast of The Lion King on Broadway and voiced Kron the Iguanodon in the 2000 CGI film Dinosaur.

== Early life ==
Wright was born on November 20, 1946, in Camden, South Carolina. He was a student at Camden High School, where he was involved with sports and the arts.

== Career ==
In 1968, Wright moved to New York City to pursue his acting career full time. Wright originated the part of "Sam" in Over Here! on Broadway (1974). In addition, on Broadway, Wright replaced Ben Vereen as the Leading Player in Pippin (1972).

Wright played Enos' partner Officer Turk Adams in the TV series Enos, the Dukes of Hazzard spin-off in 1980–81. Wright was nominated for a Tony Award in 1984 for Best Featured Actor in a Musical for his performance in The Tap Dance Kid. He portrayed jazz trumpeter and composer Dizzy Gillespie in the 1988 Clint Eastwood film Bird.

He originated the role of Mayor Joe Clark in Mule Bone (1991). He was nominated for a Tony Award again in 1998 for Best Featured Actor in a Musical as the original lead actor for Mufasa in The Lion King, the Broadway version of Disney's animated classic of the same name.

He also played the part of Jericho on the short-lived Fox television program Jonny Zero in 2005.

=== Music and voice-over work ===
Wright narrated the 1988 documentary film Thelonious Monk: Straight, No Chaser, produced by Clint Eastwood.

Wright performed and recorded several songs for the Walt Disney Pictures animated film The Little Mermaid, as Sebastian the Crab, and is widely known for the songs "Under the Sea", and "Kiss the Girl". He voiced Sebastian in The Little Mermaid's sequels and spin-offs, including The Little Mermaid 2: Return to the Sea and The Little Mermaid: Ariel's Beginning (the latter being his final voice role), and recorded several albums in reggae style, among them Sebastian from The Little Mermaid and Sebastian: Party Gras!. Wright also voiced Kron, the leader of the Iguanadon herd, Dinosaur, another Disney animated film.

He released a soul music single in 1973, "There's Something Funny Going On" backed with "Three Hundred Pounds of Hungry" on the Paramount Records label.

== Personal life and death ==
Wright met his wife Amanda Wright, a dance director, at a production of William Shakespeare's The Two Gentlemen of Verona in London's West End. They married on June 14, 1974. Together they had three children: Keely, Dee, and Sam Jr.

Wright died from prostate cancer at his home in Walden, New York, on May 24, 2021, aged 74. The cancer had been diagnosed 3 years earlier.

== Filmography ==
=== Film ===
Year	Title	Role	Notes	Ref(s)
1988	Bird	Dizzy Gillespie		
1988	Me and Him	Paramedic #1		
1989	The Little Mermaid	Sebastian (voice)		
1993	Strapped	Dave		
2000	Dinosaur	Kron (voice)		
2000	The Little Mermaid II: Return to the Sea	Sebastian (voice)	Direct-to-video	
2008	The Little Mermaid: Ariel's Beginning	Sebastian (voice)	Direct-to-video; Final role	

=== Television ===
Year	Title	Role	Notes	Ref(s)
1976	Ball Four	C. B. Travis	5 episodes	
1979	Hollow Image	Scotty	Television film	
1980–1981	Enos	Officer Turk Adams	18 episodes	
1982	The Neighborhood	Moving Man	Television film	
1985	Brass	Captain Michael Shore	Television film	
1986	The Gift of Amazing Grace	Morris	Episode: "The Gift of Amazing Grace"	
1986	The Cosby Show	Dr. Dan Morgan	Episode: "Close to Home"	
1991	Separate but Equal	Artis Patterson	TV mini-series	
1991	Sebastian's Caribbean Jamboree	Sebastian (voice)	Television special	
1991	Sebastian's Party Gras!	Sebastian (voice)	Television special	
1992–1994	The Little Mermaid	Sebastian (voice)	31 episodes	
1992	Raw Toonage	Sebastian (voice)	Episode: "Draining Cats and Dogs/Mars vs. Man"	
1993	Alex Haley's Queen	Alfred	2 episodes	
1993	Marsupilami	Sebastian (voice)	8 episodes	
1994–2000	Law & Order	Jerome Osborn, Dubois, and Morris Stokely	3 episodes	
1997	New York Undercover	Gil Jefferson	Episode: "Fade Out"	
2001–2002	House of Mouse	Sebastian (voice)	6 episodes	

=== Video games ===
Year	Title	Role	Ref(s)
1992	Ariel the Little Mermaid	Sebastian	
1997	Ariel's Story Studio	Sebastian	
1999	Disney's Arcade Frenzy	Sebastian	
2000	The Little Mermaid II: The Video Game	Sebastian	

== Theatre ==
Year	Title	Role	Notes	Ref(s)
1971	Jesus Christ Superstar	Reporter, Leper, Apostle	Broadway	
1971, 1973	Two Gentlemen of Verona	Valentine, Performer	Broadway, West End	
1972	Pippin	Leading player	Broadway	
1974	Over Here!	Sam	Broadway	
1983	The Tap Dance Kid	William Sheridan	Broadway	
1989	Welcome to the Club	Bruce Aiken	Broadway	
1991	Mule Bone	Mayor Joe Clark	Broadway	
1997	Promises, Promises	Mr. Kirkeby	Off-Broadway	
1997	The Lion King	Mufasa	Broadway	

== Discography ==
- Sebastian from The Little Mermaid (1990)
- Sebastian: Party Gras! (1991)
- The Little Mermaid: Songs from the Sea (1992)
