= Sebastian from The Little Mermaid =

Studio album by Samuel E. Wright (as Sebastian)
- Released: October 1990
- Recorded: 1988–1990
- Studio: Grove Music Studios, Ocho Rios, Jamaica
- Genre: Calypso, reggae
- Label: Walt Disney
- Producer: Don Mizell; Leonard Jones

Samuel E. Wright (as Sebastian) chronology
The Little Mermaid: Original Motion Picture Soundtrack (1989)	Sebastian from The Little Mermaid (1990)	Sebastian: Party Gras! (1991)

Professional ratings
Review scores
Source	Rating
Allmusic	3.5/5 stars

Sebastian from The Little Mermaid (credited as Disney's Sebastian) is the first of three original albums inspired by Disney's The Little Mermaid film. Many of the songs are cover versions of classic calypso and reggae songs. All of the songs are performed by Samuel E. Wright as Sebastian the crab with the exception of "Dancing Mood" and "Dance the Day Away", performed by Jodi Benson as Ariel, who also joins Sebastian on "Day-O". Jason Marin plays the speaking role of Flounder in the beginning and end of some tracks. The album was recorded in Jamaica and the reggae group Third World performs rhythm tracks and background vocals.

== Track listing ==
No.	Title	Writer(s)	Length
1.	"Arise"	Michael Cooper	4:49
2.	"Three Little Birds"	Bob Marley	4:05
3.	"You Can Get It If You Really Want"	Jimmy Cliff	3:52
4.	"Music Sweet"	Winston Bailey	3:59
5.	"Hot, Hot, Hot"	Alphonsus Cassell	3:09
6.	"Under the Sea"	Howard Ashman, Alan Menken	3:25
7.	"Dancing Mood"	Alphonsus Cassell	3:58
8.	"Dance the Day Away"	Don Mizell, Leonard Jones	3:11
9.	"Day-O (The Banana Boat Song)"	Irving Burgie, William Attaway	2:59
10.	"Take This Song"	William Clarke, Michael Cooper, Stephen Coore, Richard Daley, Kenny Gamble, Cladine Nesbeth, William Stewart	3:11
11.	"Jamaica Farewell"	Irving Burgie	3:33
Total length:			40:06

== Personnel ==
- Producer: Don Mizell
- Co-Producer: Leonard Jones
- Executive Producers: Don Mizell and Harold Kleiner
- Recording Engineers: Stephen Stewart and Barry O'Hare
- Remix Engineer: Micheal Becker
- Assistant Remix Engineers: George Felden and Tim Malcolm
- MIDI programming by Leonard Jones
- Production Coordination by Lousie Foster and Karl Young
- Sebastian vocals by Samuel E. Wright (credited as Sam Wright)
- Ariel vocals by Jodi Benson
- Rhythm tracks and background vocals performed by Third World:
  - Ibo Cooper: synthesizers, background vocals
  - Cat Coore: guitar, background vocals
  - Richie Daley: bass
  - Willie Stewart: drums, percussion
  - Bunny Rugs Clarke: background vocals
- Additional background vocals: Pam Hall, J.C. Lodge, Nadine Sutherland, Judy Emmanuel and Leonard Jones
- Additional background vocals on Three Little Birds by the children of St. Johns Preparatory School, Ocho Rios, Jamaica
- Dave Madden: trumpet
- Glen Dacosta: sax
- Bubbles Cameron: trombone
