= The Little Mermaid Live! =

2019 American TV program

- Promotional poster
- Genre: Musical fantasy
- Based on: The Little Mermaid by: John Musker; Ron Clements
- Directed by: Hamish Hamilton
- Presented by: Jodi Benson
- Starring: Auliʻi Cravalho; Graham Phillips; Queen Latifah; Shaggy; Amber Riley; John Stamos
- Composer: Alan Menken
- Country of origin: United States
- Original language: English

Production
- Executive producers: Hamish Hamilton; Katy Mullan; David Jammy; Raj Kapoor; Ian Stewart; Richard Kraft
- Production locations: Walt Disney Studios, Burbank, California
- Editors: Bill DeRonde; Guy Harding; John Zimmer
- Running time: 83 minutes
- Production company: Done and Dusted

Original release
- Network: ABC
- Release: November 5, 2019

The Wonderful World of Disney Presents The Little Mermaid Live!, or simply The Little Mermaid Live! is a 2019 musical television special created for ABC, based on Disney's 1989 animated feature film The Little Mermaid. It is produced by Done and Dusted and directed by Hamish Hamilton, who also executive produced alongside Katy Mullan, David Jammy, Raj Kapoor, Ian Stewart, and Richard Kraft, with the original voice of Ariel, Jodi Benson, introducing the special.

Auliʻi Cravalho stars as Princess Ariel, alongside Queen Latifah, Shaggy, John Stamos, Amber Riley and Graham Phillips. The hybrid format special was performed in front of a live audience on the Disney lot, where the film was projected on a giant projection surface and interwoven with live musical performances of songs from the film and the Broadway stage version.

The Little Mermaid Live! aired on ABC on November 5, 2019, as part of The Wonderful World of Disney brand, and according to Nielsen Media Research, was watched by 9.01 million viewers, making it the highest-rated made-for-TV musical on any network since Grease Live! in January 2016. It was the highest-rated entertainment telecast since the series finale of The Big Bang Theory in May 2019. The special received mixed reviews, particularly for the limited amount of live portions.

== Cast ==
- Auliʻi Cravalho as Ariel, the sixteen-year old mermaid princess of Atlantica who is obsessed with humans.
- Graham Phillips as Prince Eric, a traveling prince who was saved by Ariel, only remembering her voice.
- Queen Latifah as Ursula, a sea witch who takes Ariel's voice and is determined to replace Ariel's father, King Triton, as ruler of Atlantica.
- Shaggy as Sebastian, a Jamaican crab who is King Triton's royal advisor and court composer.
- John Stamos as Chef Louis, Eric's chef who loves fish food and tries to cook Sebastian. Stamos reprises his role from the live concert event at the Hollywood Bowl.
- Amber Riley as Emcee, an original character who introduces the daughters of Triton.
- Dominique Kelley as Grimsby, Prince Eric's valet.
- Bagel as Max, Prince Eric's pet sheepdog.

Ariel's fish best friend Flounder and Ursula's pet eels Flotsam and Jetsam appear as puppets, but they are silent. Guillermo Rodriguez from Jimmy Kimmel Live! has a cameo as "dat blowfish" during "Under the Sea".

== Musical numbers ==
All music composed by Alan Menken with lyrics by Howard Ashman, except where indicated.

- "Fathoms Below"† – Eric, Grimsby, and Sailors
- "Daughters of Triton"† – Emcee and Mersisters
- "Part of Your World" – Ariel
- "Part of Your World" (reprise) – Ariel
- "Under the Sea" – Sebastian, Ariel and Sea Creatures
- "Poor Unfortunate Souls" – Ursula and Ariel
- "Her Voice"‡ – Eric
- "Les Poissons"† – Chef Louis
- "Kiss the Girl" – Sebastian and Sea Creatures
- "If Only"‡ – Ariel and Eric
- "Poor Unfortunate Souls"† (reprise) – Vanessa and Ursula
- "Happy Ending"† – Cast

"†" indicates lyrics by Ashman and Glenn Slater

"‡" indicates lyrics by Slater

== Production ==
=== Development ===
In May 2017, ABC announced plans to broadcast a live adaptation of the 1989 musical film The Little Mermaid for the 2017–18 season titled The Wonderful World of Disney: The Little Mermaid Live. The title is a nod to ABC's long-running The Wonderful World of Disney brand used over the years for various Disney specials. The two-hour special, produced by Done and Dusted and set to air on October 3, 2017, would intertwine the film with live musical performances via cutting-edge technology. It would be similar to the format of the live concerts at the Hollywood Bowl, which combined a screening of the film with live accompaniment by guest musicians and celebrities. The Hollywood Bowl's production of The Little Mermaid Live-to-Film featured Lea Michele (as Ariel), Harvey Fierstein (as Ursula), Cheech Marin (as Chef Louis), Joshua Turchin (as Flounder), Peter Gallagher (as King Triton), Leo Gallo (as Prince Eric), Ken Page (as Sebastian) and composer Alan Menken. The special aimed to appeal to the recent trend of live made-for-television productions of Broadway musicals on network television, such as those of NBC. In August 2017, it was announced that the special had been postponed due to budget issues.

In August 2019, ABC announced that the project had been revived to mark the 30th anniversary of the film's original release, and would air on November 5, 2019. The special was a mix of live action, animation and puppetry, and feature performances of songs from the film and its 2007 Broadway stage version. It was produced by Done and Dusted and directed by Hamish Hamilton, who is also executive producing alongside Katy Mullan, David Jammy, Raj Kapoor, Ian Stewart, and Richard Kraft.

=== Casting ===
In August 2019, Auliʻi Cravalho was cast as Princess Ariel, along with Queen Latifah as Ursula and Shaggy as Sebastian. The following month, John Stamos was announced as reprising his role of Chef Louis from the Hollywood Bowl production and Graham Phillips joining the cast as Prince Eric. In October, Amber Riley was announced as an original character called Emcee, erroneously reported to be the host of the special. In November 2019, Jodi Benson, the original voice of Ariel, announced that she would be making a special appearance in the live spectacular.

=== Filming ===
At the Television Critics Association, Hamilton explained that the special will be half-live musical and half-original animated feature—an "interesting hybrid". He elaborated that a live audience would be invited to a Little Mermaid "dive-in theater" built on the Disney lot in Burbank, California, where the film was projected on a giant projection surface and "when we get to one of [the] songs, essentially we transition beautifully and smoothly into a world of live performance." In September 2019, Nick Florez and RJ Durell joined as choreographers.

== Release ==
The Little Mermaid Live! aired in the United States on ABC on November 5, 2019. In August 2019, ABC Entertainment president Karey Burke stated that in addition to marking the film's anniversary, the special would also be used as a pre-launch promotional push for the new streaming service Disney+, which would launch the following week. Burke said, "We wanted to launch it in November, in time to coincide with the launch of Disney+. It felt like a great promotional platform to speak to that." The special was subsequently released for streaming on Disney+ on November 27.

== Reception ==
=== Ratings ===
In the United States, the telecast received a 2.6/12 percent share among adults between the ages of 18 and 49, meaning that it was seen by 2.6 percent of all households, and 12 percent of all of those watching television at the time of the broadcast. It was watched by 9.01 million viewers. The special was the highest-rated made-for-TV musical on any network since Grease: Live in January 2016, and was the top-rated entertainment telecast since the series finale of The Big Bang Theory in May 2019. It ranked fourth in the modern era of live televised musicals among adults 18–49, and seventh in terms of total viewers.

=== Critical response ===
The special received mixed reviews by both critics and social media. On Metacritic, the special has received a weighted average score of 51 out of 100 based on 8 critics, indicating "mixed or average reviews". Deadline's Dino-Ray Ramos called the production "enjoyable" and "could very well be a solid". The Hollywood Reporter's Robyn Bahr criticized ABC's decision to just show the musical numbers live, but applauded the live performances, saying they were "so engaging it's a shame most of this show was spent replaying the animated film". Kelly Lawler of USA Today also gave a negative review, saying the special was "a solid, full-throated effort by the actors and chorus members, but a spectacular failure of a live TV event that couldn't get past its own awkwardness." Daniel D'Addario of Variety, however, was more positive in his review, calling it "often-jittery" but "ultimately charming". Noel Murray of The New York Times also gave the special a mixed review, essentially stating that while it worked in concept, and the performers did an admirable job, the execution was muddled. Darren Franich of Entertainment Weekly gave the special a "D" grade, stating it "felt like watching [the original film] with regular interruptions for commercials and karaoke."

On social media, particular attention was given toward the "creepy-looking" Flounder puppet and Shaggy's costume. In the latter's case, the common complaint was that during "Les Poissons" the audience was wearing crab claws while Shaggy did not during "Under the Sea", even though he was supposed to be portraying a crab. In response to this, ABC senior vice president Robert Mills responded on Twitter that Shaggy did wear crab claws during the dress rehearsal, but they were removed because it was thought they "looked ridiculous", and at the end of the special, shared a photo of Shaggy with the crab claws on.

Queen Latifah was widely praised for her performance, even in reviews criticizing the overall production, with The Hollywood Reporter calling her performance "the best moment of the evening".

=== Accolades ===
Award	Category	Recipient	Result	Ref.
72nd Primetime Creative Arts Emmy Awards	Outstanding Contemporary Makeup for a Variety, Nonfiction or Reality Program (Non-Prosthetic)	Bruce Grayson, Angela Moos, Julie Socash, Alison Gladieux, Valerie Hunt, Tym Buacharen, Jennifer Nigh and Robin Beauchesne	Nominated	
72nd Primetime Creative Arts Emmy Awards	Outstanding Production Design for a Variety Special	Misty Buckley, Joe Celli and Jason Howard	Nominated	
72nd Primetime Creative Arts Emmy Awards	Outstanding Technical Direction, Camerawork, Video Control for a Special	Iqbal Hans, Rod Wardell, Emilie Scaminaci, Michael Miatico, Damien Tuffereau, Nathanial Havholm, Freddy Frederick, Salvatore Livia, Jofre Rosero, Easter Xua, David Plakos, Patrick Gleason, Keyan Safyari and David Eastwood	Nominated	
