= The Little Mermaid Jr. =

- Music: Alan Menken
- Lyrics: Howard Ashman; Glenn Slater
- Book: Doug Wright
- Basis: The Little Mermaid by Hans Christian Andersen; The Little Mermaid by John Musker; Ron Clements

The Little Mermaid Jr. is a stage musical produced by Disney Theatrical, based on the animated 1989 Disney film of the same name and the classic story of the same name by Hans Christian Andersen about a mermaid who dreams of the world above the sea and gives up her voice to find love. Its book is by Doug Wright, music by Alan Menken and lyrics by Howard Ashman (written for the film), with additional lyrics by Glenn Slater. The Little Mermaid Jr. first became available to license by the company Music Theater International and Disney Theatrical Productions.

A 60-minute adaption of the musical was produced, containing appropriate song keys for young children and accompaniment tracks so that live music is not necessary.

== Plot ==
Prince Eric, his adviser, Grimsby, and sailors are aboard a ship at sea, discussing the "mythical" merfolk that supposedly live under the sea. Grimsby wants Eric to return to court to fulfill his birthright as king. However, Eric hears a beautiful voice and commands it to be followed ("Fathoms Below").

Deep on the ocean floor in the merfolk kingdom, a concert in honor of a thwarted coup d'état by Ursula is underway, being performed by the daughters of Triton the sea king. King Triton's court composer, Sebastian the crab, has composed a song for girls to perform ("Daughters of Triton"). However, the youngest daughter, Ariel, is not there for her solo, bringing the concert to a halt. Ariel has forgotten about the concert and is swimming around the surface, admiring a new item for her collection, a fork. She reveals that she is fascinated with the human world. Together with her best friend Flounder, Ariel visits Scuttle and his fellow seagulls to ask about the human things she's collected, and he explains them somewhat erroneously ("Human Stuff").

Elsewhere, the sea witch Ursula is planning revenge against, King Triton. She was banished from the palace for using black magic, and tells her minions Flotsam and Jetsam to keep an eye on Ariel, whom she thinks will be the key to getting the crown and trident.

When Ariel returns home, she is berated by King Triton, who is angered to learn that she has been on the surface, since contact between the merfolk and the human world is forbidden. Ariel rushes off upset, and King Triton assigns Sebastian to watch over Ariel to make sure she doesn't get into trouble. Ariel sits alone in her grotto, which contains her collection of human things, and imagines living in the human world ("Part of Your World"). Sebastian shows up and finds out about Ariel's collection of human things, and tells her that the ocean is better than land (“Under the sea”) After, Sebastian notices Ariel has left, so he sets out to look for her. Ariel and Flounder meet Scuttle at the surface to see Prince Eric's ship up close. On board, Grimsby tells Eric that he must find a bride and take his place as king. A storm suddenly hits, and Eric is tossed overboard. Ariel saves him from drowning and drags him to shore. She realizes that she is falling in love with him, and vows to find a way to be with him ("Part of Your World (Reprise)").

After Ariel returns home, her behavior makes her sisters and Flounder suspect that she has fallen in love ("She's in Love"). Sebastian reveals to King Triton that Ariel has saved a human. Triton angrily confronts her about it and uses his trident to destroy Ariel's human collection. . Ariel is encountered by Flotsam and Jetsam, who sweet talk her into seeking help from Ursula.

Ariel goes to meet Ursula, who presents a deal: Ariel will be turned into a human for three days, during which she has to win the kiss of true love from Eric. If she does, she will be human permanently; if not, her soul will belong to Ursula. In exchange, Ariel must give up her voice, which will stay in Ursula's magic nautilus shell ("Poor Unfortunate Souls"). Ariel signs the agreement and sings into the shell, after which she is transformed into a human and swims up to the surface.

Sebastian and Flounder bring Ariel, newly human, to shore. Scuttle and the seagulls give her a pep talk to raise her spirits and help her get used to her new legs. Eric arrives, but when Ariel tries to talk to him, she cannot speak. Eric brings Ariel back to his palace, where Carlotta, the head mistress, and the maids bathe and dress Ariel. Ariel is fascinated by the human world, while the maids wonder why Eric has brought such a girl to the palace. That night Chef Louis cooks dinner for Ariel, Grimsby, and Eric, and almost cooks Sebastian for the grand finale ("Les Poissons").

Eric and Ariel spend time together, during which Eric teaches her to dance ("One Step Closer"). After a tour of the kingdom, Eric takes Ariel on a quiet boat ride through a lagoon. Sebastian and Scuttle watch anxiously and try to create a romantic atmosphere for Eric to kiss Ariel ("Kiss the Girl"). Just before they kiss, Flotsam and Jetsam give the boat an "electric shock" and swim away. As the second day ends, Ariel wishes she had more time and could tell Eric everything, Triton worries about where his daughter has gone, Sebastian is concerned that Ariel's time as a human is almost up, and Eric still dreams of finding the girl who saved him even though he does not want to lose Ariel. Sebastian returns to the sea and tells an angry King Triton about Ariel's deal with Ursula.

On Ariel's last day as a human, Grimsby has arranged a contest for all foreign princesses to sing for Eric, so he may choose one for his bride ("The Contest"). Eric isn't interested in any of them, and Ariel asks to participate, dancing for him. Eric picks her, but before they can embrace, Ursula appears, declaring that the sun has set and Ariel now belongs to her. Flotsam and Jetsam grab Ariel to take her back to the sea. King Triton arrives to confront his sister, agreeing to take Ariel's place. Ursula claims the trident and declares herself queen ("Poor Unfortunate Souls" (Reprise)). She banishes Triton with a wave of the trident. During a battle with Eric's ship, Ariel grabs Ursula's Nautilus shell and regains her voice. Ursula begs Ariel to return the shell to her, as her power is contained within it. Ariel is torn but destroys the shell just in time, which restores King Triton to his throne and daughter.

Eric and Ariel are reunited on the beach, and Eric asks King Triton for his blessing to marry Ariel. King Triton says that it is Ariel's place to answer, and she accepts Eric's proposal. King Triton then says goodbye to his daughter. In honor of his daughter, Triton declares peace between the humans and merfolk. Ariel and Eric are married and sail away on a ship ("Finale").

== Changes from the 1989 film ==
In adapting the film to a live stage production, the following significant changes are made:

New songs are "Human Stuff", "One Step Closer", and "The Contest", and some songs from the film are extended, such as "Fathoms Below". "Under the Sea" is the same as the film version, but in the film it was performed while Sebastian is trying to stop Ariel from daydreaming about Eric; in the musical it occurs later, after King Triton destroys Ariel's collection of human things. In some later productions, however, the song is sung to try to stop Ariel from thinking about Eric like in the film.

In the musical, the storm at sea sequence is simplified, and Eric merely falls overboard; his sheepdog, Max, is not included, and there is no gunpowder explosion. Ursula's alter ego, Vanessa, is also not included, thereby omitting the subplot of Eric's brainwashing, leading to "The Contest". In the film, Flotsam and Jetsam are killed when Ursula accidentally zaps them with the trident; in the musical they swim away after Ariel takes Ursula's nautilus shell.

== Musical numbers ==
- "Fathoms Below" – Pilot, Sailors, Prince Eric, & Grimsby
- "Daughters of Triton" – Mersisters
- "Human Stuff" – Scuttle, Gulls, &Ariel
- "Part of Your World" – Ariel
- "Under the Sea"* – Sebastian & Sea Creatures
- "Storm at Sea" - Prince Eric, Grimbsy, & Sailors
- "Part of Your World (Reprise)" – Ariel
- "She's In Love" – Flounder & Mersisters
- "Poor Unfortunate Souls" – Ursula, Ariel, Flotsam, Jetsam, & Tentacles
- "Les Poissons" – Chef Louis & Chefs
- "One Step Closer" – Prince Eric
- "Kiss The Girl" – Sebastian & Swamp Animals
- "The Contest" – Grimsby & Princesses
- "Poor Unfortunate Souls (Reprise)" – Ursula
- "Finale" – Prince Eric, Ariel, & Company
- "Under the Sea (Bows)" – Company

Music by Alan Menken and Lyrics by Howard Ashman & Glenn Slater.

== Characters ==
- Princess Ariel, a mermaid dreaming of life on land instead of "under the sea". She is the youngest daughter of King Triton.
- Prince Eric, who Ariel rescues from drowning and falls in love with her.
- King Triton, the strict but caring father of Ariel, and ruler over Atlantica.
- Ursula, who tricks Ariel into trading her voice for a pair of human legs in order to hopefully win Prince Eric's heart, only to attempt to take advantage of Ariel's naîvete.
- Sebastian, Ariel's musical and practical guardian, Triton's faithful servant, and court composer. He serves as the musical's primary comic relief, and reluctantly assists Ariel in her efforts to charm Prince Eric.
- Flounder, Ariel's loyal companion. He often accompanies Ariel on her excursions in search of human artifacts.
- Scuttle, who believes he is an expert on human artifacts, although he is mainly incorrect, and is often consulted by Ariel for information on her discovered "treasures". He also serves as a comic relief, alongside Sebastian.
- Flotsam and Jetsam, Ursula's henchmen.
- Grimsby, Prince Eric's faithful servant and friend.
- Chef Louis, the castle chef, who tries to capture Sebastian and cook him for dinner.
- Carlotta, the castle's primary maid and housekeeper.
