= The Little Mermaid (2023 soundtrack) =

2023 soundtrack album by various artists

The Little Mermaid (2023 Original Motion Picture Soundtrack)

Soundtrack album by various artists
- Released: May 19, 2023
- Studio: Air Studios
- Genres: Soundtrack, musical theatre, reggae
- Length: 40:00
- Label: Walt Disney
- Producers: Alan Menken; Howard Ashman; Lin-Manuel Miranda

Lin-Manuel Miranda chronology
Encanto (2021)	The Little Mermaid (2023)	Warriors (2024)

Alan Menken chronology
Beauty and the Beast: A 30th Celebration (2022)	The Little Mermaid (2023)	Spellbound (2024)

Singles from The Little Mermaid
- 1. "Part of Your World" Released: April 26, 2023; 2. "Impossible Child" Released: September 8, 2023

The Little Mermaid (2023 Original Motion Picture Soundtrack) is the soundtrack album to the 2023 live-action adaptation of Disney's 1989 animated film of the same name. The soundtrack features score and songs from the original film, three new songs composed by the original film's composer Alan Menken, Howard Ashman and Lin-Manuel Miranda. The soundtrack was released digitally on May 19, 2023, and on physical CD and vinyl on May 26, 2023, by Walt Disney Records. A deluxe edition of the album was released on the same date, featuring the complete original score.

== Background ==
On March 17, 2017, it was announced that Alan Menken, who previously scored and co-wrote songs for the original film, would return as the film's composer and to write new songs alongside producer Lin-Manuel Miranda. Three months later, Menken stated that his work on the film's music had been put on hold due to Miranda and Marc Platt's schedules with Mary Poppins Returns. On May 20, 2019, Menken stated that The Little Mermaid would be his next project, following the release of the live-action adaptation of Aladdin, and on July 9, he and Miranda started working on new songs for the film. On replacing the original film's lyricist, the late Howard Ashman, Miranda felt that "[he] will definitely fall short" to Ashman's work, arguing that "no one can write like him". On January 16, 2020, Halle Bailey confirmed that the song "Part of Your World", from the original film, will appear in the remake. On February 10, 2020, Miranda revealed that he and Menken wrote four new songs for the film. On February 19, 2021, Menken said that the new songs would be a "blend" of his and Miranda's styles. He elaborated that the songs would feature "some rapping" in the vein of Miranda's previous works, as well as a closer style to his usual work.

On September 22, 2021, Menken sat down with Disney's For Scores podcast and confirmed that the film will feature four new songs. He also recalled that Miranda was "daunted" by the prospect of following in the footsteps of the late Howard Ashman, the lyricist who worked with Menken to write the original film's songs. On November 24, 2021, in a recent interview with Collider, Miranda talked about his admiration for The Little Mermaid and how Ashman and Menken helped shape his childhood. He said:

"Oh, man. So much of my work on The Little Mermaid was that wish fulfillment. I actually didn't write any new songs for Sebastian the Crab because I love his songs so much. I was like, 'I can't. Nope, not me. I can't do it.' I did get to write for some of the other characters in that movie. Every song you love in The Little Mermaid is still in The Little Mermaid, we just found some new moments to musicalize. That's really tricky."

— Lin-Manuel Miranda

On January 20, 2022, Halle spoke with Stylecater, saying that she was so emotional while filming "Part of Your World". She said:

"It was really surreal to film. It was really emotional for me. It was three days of intense being all over the place. I was crying the whole time because I was just like, 'What the heck?' We're all connected to that song and it means a lot to each of us."

— Halle Bailey

On February 17, 2022, during a podcast interview with Variety, Miranda revealed that one of the new songs for the live-action film, "For the First Time", will take place when Ariel is on land in her human form. He also revealed that star Daveed Diggs might rap in the film. This was confirmed later on March 31, 2023, by Menken, revealing the title of the new rap song as "The Scuttlebutt". He described it as a "harebrained" song for Scuttle and Sebastian "...trying to figure out what's going on because they hear rumors that the prince has decided to marry. They think it must be Ariel but of course, it's Ursula in the form of Vanessa. It's all this delicious imagination. Lin's lyrics are to die for."

Menken then provided more details on the new songs, revealing that the first of the four that was written during the film's development was a solo for Prince Eric, "Wild Uncharted Waters", resulting from Marshall wanting "...a new song for this moment of waves and all the wildness of what's out there in the ocean...[Ariel] represented that to [Prince Eric]; she is the girl who saved his life. Live action films are really a director's medium." He then revealed that the fourth song did not make the final cut and was supposed to be a new song for King Triton entitled "Impossible Child", as he and the filmmakers felt that it "dramaturgically" was not needed, but did say that the song would be released to the public at a later date, possibly on the film's home media release. The song was featured as an additional track on a physical version of the soundtrack released as a HSN exclusive. Some of the lyrics for "Poor Unfortunate Souls" and "Kiss the Girl" were updated as well, with Menken explaining that for "Kiss the Girl", it was because "people have gotten very sensitive about the idea that [Prince Eric] would, in any way, force himself on [Ariel]," while that for "Poor Unfortunate Souls", it was because of "...lines that might make young girls somehow feel that they shouldn't speak out of turn, even though Ursula is clearly manipulating Ariel to give up her voice."

In a first for the live-action remakes of Disney's animated musical films, two songs from the original film were cut: "Daughters of Triton," sung by Ariel's sisters and "Les Poissons," sung by the character of Eric's French cook Chef Louis, who also was cut from the film. Menken explained the reasons for cutting the former, saying that it felt "not needed" given the new approach the filmmakers gave to the sisters, and that they wanted the film to begin "with a much more of a live-action feel of the ocean and meeting Ariel, and then we wait a little bit, make you wait until we get to 'Part of Your World.' And I think that was, you know, it was an amazing choice because it just builds the power and anticipation."

== Release ==
The soundtrack album was made available to pre-save and pre-order on March 13, 2023. and will be released digitally on May 19, 2023, and on physical CD and vinyl on May 26, 2023, by Walt Disney Records. The deluxe edition of the soundtrack featuring Menken's complete original score was also released on the same date. Bailey's version of "Part of Your World" was released a digital download single on April 26, 2023, one week before the film's release, along with its Korean version by Danielle Marsh of NewJeans. Bailey performed the song live under non-competition performance, at the "Disney Night" episode of the 21st season of American Idol on May 14, 2023. An outtake of "Impossible Child", performed by Javier Bardem, was released as a digital single on September 8, 2023.

== Track listing ==
All music is composed by Alan Menken.

The Little Mermaid (2023 Original Motion Picture Soundtrack)
No.	Title	Lyrics	Performer(s)	Length
1.	"Triton's Kingdom"			2:32
2.	"Part of Your World"	Howard Ashman	Halle Bailey	3:34
3.	"Fathoms Below"	Ashman	Jonah Hauer-King, John Dagleish, Christopher Fairbank and Ensemble	1:28
4.	"Part of Your World (Reprise)"	Ashman	Bailey	2:37
5.	"Under the Sea"	Ashman	Daveed Diggs and Cast	3:04
6.	"Wild Uncharted Waters"	Lin-Manuel Miranda	Hauer-King	2:59
7.	"Poor Unfortunate Souls"	Ashman; Miranda	Melissa McCarthy	4:42
8.	"For the First Time"	Miranda	Bailey	4:08
9.	"Kiss the Girl"	Ashman; Miranda	Diggs, Awkwafina, Jacob Tremblay and Ensemble	3:16
10.	"The Scuttlebutt"	Miranda	Awkwafina and Diggs	2:01
11.	"Eric's Decision"			2:21
12.	"Vanessa's Trick"		Bailey	1:03
13.	"Part of Your World (Reprise II)"	Ashman; Miranda	Bailey	1:33
14.	"Kiss the Girl (Island Band Reprise)"			2:17
15.	"Finale"			2:25
Total length:				40:00

The Little Mermaid (2023 Original Motion Picture Soundtrack) – deluxe edition
No.	Title	Lyrics	Performer(s)	Length
1.	"Triton's Kingdom"			2:32
2.	"Part of Your World"	Howard Ashman	Halle Bailey	3:34
3.	"Fathoms Below"	Ashman	Jonah Hauer-King, John Dagleish, Christopher Fairbank and Ensemble	1:28
4.	"Part of Your World (Reprise)"	Ashman	Bailey	2:37
5.	"Under the Sea"	Ashman	Daveed Diggs and Cast	3:04
6.	"Wild Uncharted Waters"	Lin-Manuel Miranda	Hauer-King	2:59
7.	"Poor Unfortunate Souls"	Ashman; Miranda	Melissa McCarthy	4:42
8.	"For the First Time"	Miranda	Bailey	4:08
9.	"Kiss the Girl"	Ashman; Miranda	Diggs, Awkwafina, Jacob Tremblay and Ensemble	3:16
10.	"The Scuttlebutt"	Miranda	Awkwafina and Diggs	2:01
11.	"Eric's Decision"			2:21
12.	"Vanessa's Trick"		Bailey	1:03
13.	"Part of Your World (Reprise II)"	Ashman; Miranda	Bailey	1:33
14.	"Kiss the Girl (Island Band Reprise)"			2:17
15.	"Finale"			2:25
16.	"Opening Title"			1:00
17.	"Eric's Ship"			1:31
18.	"Shipwreck Graveyard"			1:53
19.	"Shark Attack"			1:33
20.	"Dinglehopper"			1:37
21.	"Ursula's Reveal"			1:30
22.	"Ariel's Grotto"			0:45
23.	"Shipwreck"			3:31
24.	"The Rescue"			1:07
25.	"Triton's Fury"			2:31
26.	"Journey to Ursula"			1:54
27.	"Ursula's Lair"			1:52
28.	"Eric's Library"			1:24
29.	"Carriage Ride"			2:36
30.	"Marketplace"			1:42
31.	"Ursula's Potion"			1:32
32.	"Ariel Regains Her Voice"		Bailey (Uncredited)	1:39
33.	"The Sun Sets"			1:14
34.	"Ursula Battle"			4:28
35.	"Metamorphosis"			1:02
36.	"The Kiss"			0:53
37.	"Ariel's Goodbye"			1:23
Total length:				1:18:00

== Charts ==
=== Weekly charts ===
Weekly chart performance for The Little Mermaid (2023 Original Motion Picture Soundtrack)
Chart (2023)	Peak position
Belgian Albums (Ultratop Flanders)	54
New Zealand Albums (RMNZ)	32
Spanish Albums (Promusicae)	94
UK Compilation Albums (OCC)	4
UK Album Downloads (OCC)	15
UK Soundtrack Albums (OCC)	3
US Billboard 200	21
US Top Soundtracks (Billboard)	1

=== Year-end charts ===
2023 year-end chart performance for The Little Mermaid (2023 Original Motion Picture Soundtrack)
Chart (2023)	Position
US Soundtrack Albums (Billboard)	17

== See also ==
- The Little Mermaid (1989 soundtrack)
