= The Little Mermaid (musical) =

2007 musical based on the 1989 film of the same name

- Playbill cover at the Lunt-Fontanne Theatre
- Music: Alan Menken
- Lyrics: Howard Ashman; Glenn Slater
- Book: Doug Wright
- Basis: The Little Mermaid by John Musker; Ron Clements; The Little Mermaid by Hans Christian Andersen
- Productions: 2007 Denver (tryout); 2008 Broadway

The Little Mermaid is a stage musical produced by Disney Theatrical Productions, based on the 1989 film by Walt Disney Animation Studios and the fairy tale by Hans Christian Andersen about a mermaid who dreams of the world above the sea and gives up her voice to find true love. Its book is by Doug Wright, music by Alan Menken and lyrics by Howard Ashman (written for the film), with additional lyrics by Glenn Slater. Its underwater setting and story about aquatic characters requires unusual technical designs and strategies to create gliding movements for the actors.

After a pre-Broadway tryout in Denver, Colorado from July to September 2007, the musical began Broadway previews on November 3, 2007, at the Lunt-Fontanne Theatre, replacing Disney's Beauty and the Beast. The production officially opened on January 10, 2008, and closed on August 30, 2009, after 685 performances and 50 previews. It introduced Broadway debuts by director Francesca Zambello and Sierra Boggess in the title role.

Subsequent productions have been seen in US regional theatres and internationally. A modified version of the musical with a new book and direction by Glenn Casale was developed in 2012, and this version is the basis for subsequent productions.

== Development ==
"It [then] becomes about how does she live underwater, and how do you make that world? It's about the truthfulness to the story and that, in essence, gave me the idea to create something that was really a jewel-box – something that was very simple and in terms of the set, very translucent, takes light beautifully and [is] architectural and sculptural to suggest an underwater world without actually being in real water or having people swimming.'"
— Francesca Zambello, director

Disney Theatrical had success with stage adaptations of its animated musical films Beauty and the Beast in 1994 and The Lion King in 1997. Thomas Schumacher, head of Disney Theatrical, proposed another adaptation, this time of the 1989 film The Little Mermaid, approaching songwriter Alan Menken, who had composed the music for the film, to be part of the production team. Schumacher initially brought on director/choreographer Matthew Bourne to helm the musical, but Bourne left when their visions on the project differed. Schumacher then approached Francesca Zambello, telling her that "We haven't found a way to do the water". Zambello's experience with the fantasy elements of opera made her open to the project, and the decision was made that there would be no water, wires or flying in the production. Playwright Doug Wright was brought on as book writer, focusing the story line on Ariel's longing not for her prince, but for "a world in which she feels truly realized in her own terms. ... Her ambitions are bigger than any one man." For the songs, Menken brought on lyricist Glenn Slater, whom he'd worked with on Home on the Range, and together they wrote ten new songs for the stage musical, adding '60s rock, vaudeville and 1920s Brechtian cabaret to the sound of the show.

In creating the underwater world on stage, director Zambello asked her design team to use translucent materials to create abstract shapes and manipulate light to give the watery illusion. The design team consisted of George Tsypin for sets, Natasha Katz for lighting, and Tatiana Noginova for costumes – all three of whom had previously worked with Zambello. For the performers' movements, choreographer Stephen Mear had the actors wear Heelys wheeled footwear, dubbed "merblades", while tails on sprung-steel rods, designed by Michael Curry, were attached to their hips. Sierra Boggess, who originated the role of Ariel, was an ice-skater and had no trouble with the Heelys, but the rest of the cast took some getting used to the footwear. Ariel's tail originally had a motor inside that allowed the fluke to move independently, but the mechanics made the tail heavy and loud and were removed.

Rehearsals for the Broadway production began on May 29, 2007, at the New 42nd Street Studios in New York. The cast had six weeks of rehearsals before the pre-Broadway tryout.

=== Reimagining ===
After the Broadway production underperformed at the box office and closed in 2009, director Glenn Casale was brought on to reinvent the musical for the 2012 Dutch production. He made changes to the score and book, adding the new song "Daddy's Little Angel" to replace "I Want the Good Times Back" (which gives Ursula and Triton a new backstory), and replacing the Heelys worn by the actors to introduce aerial effects and flying harnesses to create the illusion of being underwater. The new stage design was made by Bob Crowley, with the world above water made to look like a pop-up book, using cardboard waves and rocks. The character of Carlotta was entirely omitted in this version, leaving Grimsby with her lines, and Flounder was a teenager. Following the success of the Dutch production, Casale then worked with California Musical Theatre to present a regional production of the musical in the round. The various changes introduced by Casale in these productions have been incorporated into the official version of the show that Disney Theatrical currently licenses for amateur and professional productions.

== Productions ==
=== Denver tryout (2007) ===
The Little Mermaid had a pre-Broadway tryout at the Denver Center for the Performing Arts' Ellie Caulkins Opera House from July 26, 2007, through September 9, 2007. Every seat available (approximately 95,000 seats) for the 6-week run was sold out.

=== Broadway (2008–2009) ===
The musical began previews on Broadway at the Lunt-Fontanne Theatre on November 3, 2007, and was temporarily shut down on November 10, 2007, due to the 2007 Broadway stagehand strike. The strike ended on November 28, 2007, and the show resumed previews the next day. The official opening date was postponed from December 6, 2007, to January 10, 2008. Jodi Benson and Pat Carroll, who starred in the 1989 animated film as Ariel and Ursula, respectively, attended the opening night ceremony.

Direction was by Francesca Zambello, making her Broadway debut, with choreography by Stephen Mear. Scenic design was by George Tsypin, costumes by Tatiana Noginova, lighting by Natasha Katz and projections by Sven Ortel. The original cast featured newcomer Sierra Boggess in the title role of Ariel, Sean Palmer as Prince Eric, Brian D'Addario and Trevor Braun alternated as Flounder, Norm Lewis as King Triton, Sherie Rene Scott as Ursula, Tituss Burgess as Sebastian, Tyler Maynard as Flotsam, Derrick Baskin as Jetsam, Jonathan Freeman as Grimsby, and John Treacy Egan as Chef Louis. Notable replacements included Faith Prince as Ursula and Drew Seeley as Prince Eric. The production closed on August 30, 2009, after 50 previews and 685 performances. Thomas Schumacher, producer and president of Disney Theatrical Productions said, "it would be fiscally irresponsible to our shareholders to risk operating losses with such a big show in the historically challenging fall months. We are closing the Broadway production to concentrate on the long future life of this title."

=== Regional US and Canada productions ===
Regional US productions include the Tuacahn Amphitheatre in Ivins, Utah (2011, 2014, 2019); The Muny, St. Louis, Missouri (2011, 2017); the Sacramento Music Circus, Sacramento (2012); the Paper Mill Playhouse in Millburn, New Jersey (2013), the Chanhassen Dinner Theatres in Minneapolis-Saint Paul, Minnesota (2014), the Music Hall at Fair Park in Dallas, Texas (2014), and the White Plains Performing Arts Center, New York (2014). There have also been limited tours of regional productions, such as a 2015 tour by Theatre Under the Stars, and a 2016 tour which launched at the 5th Avenue Theatre on November 23, 2016, and made stops in Orlando, Cincinnati, Atlanta and Louisville, among other cities. A production at California Musical Theatre in Sacramento, directed by Casale, was performed in the round.

The first Canadian production opened on August 13, 2014, and ran until August 29, 2014, at Rainbow Stage, Winnipeg, MB. Colleen Furlan starred as Ariel along with Marc Devigne as Prince Eric and Jennifer Lyon as Ursula. The production was directed by Ann Hodges and choreographed by Linda Garneau, with music direction by Elizabeth Baird. The costumes used were made for this original cast by Kansas City Costumes. Another Canadian production opened on November 19, 2014, at the Dunfield Theatre in Cambridge, Ontario, where it ran until December 21, 2014.

=== International productions ===
==== Israel (2010–2011) ====
A Hebrew production ran in Tel Aviv and other cities in Israel during the 2010/2011 season, directed by Moshe Kaftan and starring Rinat Gabay as Ariel and Guy Zu-Aretz as Prince Eric.

==== Philippines (2011) ====
Atlantis Productions staged its own version on the show at the Meralco Theater in Manila, where it ran from November 18, 2011, to December 11, 2011, with Rachelle Ann Go as Ariel and Erik Santos as Prince Eric. The production incorporated Asian elements into its costume design by Eric Pineda. A majority of the cast members played as puppeteer-actors, who controlled wayang or shadow puppets, bunraku or traditional Japanese puppets, and nang kaloung or Cambodian puppets during certain parts of the show.

==== The Netherlands (2012–2013) ====
The Dutch version, produced by Stage Entertainment, officially opened on June 16, 2012, at the Nieuwe Luxor Theater in Rotterdam and after touring The Netherlands, it performed a whole season at the Beatrix Theater in Utrecht, from September 5, 2012, to July 7, 2013, playing more than 400 performances. This was the first revised production, directed by Glen Casale and featuring new set design by Bob Crowley. The new song "Daddy's Little Angel" was added and the set design was changed to include flying harnesses and aerial effects to create the underwater illusion, while the world above was depicted with a storybook design. Casale's changes to the production have since been incorporated into the official licensed version of the musical.

==== Russia (2012–2014) ====
In Russia The Little Mermaid opened on October 8, 2012, at the Rossiya Theatre in Moscow, using the Dutch designs and directions by Bob Crowley and Glenn Casale, respectively. Produced by Stage Entertainment, the show took its final curtain call on April 13, 2014, after 502 performances and having been seen by more than 700.000 people. This production won two Golden Mask National Theatre Awards, for Best Production for an Operetta/Musical and Best Actress for Manana Gogitidze's portrayal of Ursula.

==== Japan (2013–present) ====
A Japanese production ran in Tokyo from April 7, 2013, to April 9, 2017, with the designs and directions used in the Dutch production by Bob Crowley and Glenn Casale, respectively. A live album recording with the original cast was released in 2013. After closing in Tokyo, the show was transferred to Fukuoka from August 11, 2017, to November 4, 2018, and Sapporo from December 22, 2018, to February 26, 2020. The final performance in Sapporo was initially expected to take place on March 15, 2020, but it was moved forward due to the COVID-19 pandemic.

Concurrently, a second production ran in Nagoya from October 15, 2016, to August 26, 2018. After closing in Nagoya, the show was transferred to Osaka from October 13, 2018, to November 21, 2021, Shizuoka from April 2 to May 29, 2022, Hiroshima from July 11 to October 10, 2022, Sendai from November 26, 2022, to March 12, 2023, and Sapporo from May 28 to November 26, 2023.

A reworked sit-down production opened on August 26, 2026 at Tokyo Disney Resort.

==== Denmark (2014) ====
After its successful production of Aladdin during the 2012/2013 season, the Fredericia Teater teamed up once again with Disney Theatrical to stage a local version of The Little Mermaid in Denmark, where it ran from July 17 to August 17, 2014, at the Copenhagen Opera House, and from August 28 to October 26, 2014, at the Fredericia Teater.

==== Belgium (2017–2018) ====
A Dutch-language production directed by Frank Van Laecke ran at the Flanders Expo in Ghent from a December 13, 2017, to January 7, 2018. After closing in Ghent, the show was transferred to Ethias Arena in Hasselt from April 13–15, 2018.

==== Brazil (2018–2022) ====
The first Latin American production opened on March 30, 2018, at the Teatro Santander in São Paulo, produced by IMM and EGG Entretenimento, and closed on July 29, 2018.

A second production premiered at Teatro Santander on July 17, 2022, using the same sets and costumes, besides retaining most of the 2018 cast. The new production was acclaimed for having Gabriel Vicente as the first black actor to play Prince Eric in Brazil.

==== Finland (2019–2024) ====
In Finland The Little Mermaid premiered on August 29, 2019, at the Helsinki City Theatre, under the direction of Samuel Harjanne. The show was well received, but it was forced to close on March 12, 2020, due to the COVID-19 pandemic. The production reopened on August 17, 2023, and ran until February 3, 2024

==== Argentina (2025) ====
A 90-minute Spanish-language production ran from June 5 to August 3, 2025 at the Teatro Gran Rex in Buenos Aires, directed by Ariel del Mastro.

== Synopsis ==
=== Act I ===
Sierra Boggess as Ariel in "Part of Your World"

Prince Eric, his nautical expert Pilot, and his advisor, Grimsby, and sailors are aboard a ship at sea, discussing the "mythical" merfolk that supposedly live under the sea. Grimsby wants Eric to return to court to fulfill his birthright as king. However, Eric hears a beautiful voice and commands it to be followed ("Fathoms Below").

Deep on the ocean floor in the merfolk kingdom, a concert in honor of a thwarted coup d'état by the sea witch Ursula is underway, being performed by the daughters of King Triton, the ruler of the sea. King Triton's court composer, Sebastian the crab, has composed a song for the girls to perform ("Daughters of Triton"). However, the youngest daughter, Ariel, is not there for her solo, bringing the concert to a halt. Ariel has forgotten about the concert and is swimming around the surface, admiring a new item for her collection, a fork. She reveals that she is fascinated with the human world ("The World Above"). Together with her best friend Flounder, Ariel visits Scuttle and his fellow seagulls to ask about the human things she's collected, and he explains them somewhat erroneously ("Human Stuff").

Elsewhere, Ursula is seeking revenge against her brother, King Triton. She was banished from the palace for using black magic, and tells her minions Flotsam and Jetsam to keep an eye on Ariel, whom she thinks will be the key to getting the crown and trident ("I Want the Good Times Back").

When Ariel returns home, King Triton is angered to learn that she has been on the surface and reprimands her: King Triton is xenophobic towards humans, believing them to be nothing but savage fish-eaters. Ariel rushes off distraught, and King Triton assigns Sebastian to watch over Ariel to make sure she doesn't get into trouble. Ariel sits alone in her grotto, which contains her collection of human things, and imagines living in the human world ("Part of Your World"). Ariel and Flounder meet Scuttle at the surface to see Prince Eric's ship up close. On board, Grimsby tells Eric that he must find a bride and take his place as king. A storm suddenly hits, and Eric is tossed overboard. Ariel saves him from drowning and drags him to shore. She realizes that she is falling in love with him, and vows to find a way to be with him ("Part of Your World (Reprise)").

After Ariel returns home, her behavior makes her sisters and Flounder suspect that she has fallen in love ("She's in Love"). On land, Eric is determined to find the woman who saved his life, but the only clue he has is ("Her Voice"). Sebastian reveals to King Triton that Ariel has saved a human. Triton angrily confronts her about it ("The World Above (Reprise)"), uncovers her grotto and uses his trident to destroy Ariel's human collection. After the king leaves, Sebastian tries to comfort Ariel by pointing out the wonders of the undersea world ("Under the Sea"), but she is disappointed with him for reporting to her father and sneaks off with Flounder during the song. Once she is away, she is stopped by Flotsam and Jetsam, who sweet talk her into seeking help from Ursula ("Sweet Child").

Ariel goes to meet Ursula, who presents a deal: Ariel will be turned into a human for three days, during which she has to win the kiss of true love from Eric. If she does, she will be human permanently; if not, her soul will belong to Ursula. In exchange, Ariel must give up her voice, which will stay in Ursula's magic nautilus shell ("Poor Unfortunate Souls"). Ariel signs the agreement and sings into the shell, after which she is transformed into a human and swims up to the surface.

=== Act II ===
Sebastian and Flounder bring Ariel, newly human, to shore. Scuttle and the seagulls give her a pep talk to raise her spirits and help her get used to her new legs ("Positoovity"). Eric arrives, but when Ariel tries to talk to him, she cannot speak. Eric brings Ariel back to his palace, where Carlotta, the head mistress, and the maids bathe and dress Ariel. Ariel is fascinated by the human world, while the maids wonder why Eric has brought such a girl to the palace ("Beyond My Wildest Dreams"). That night Chef Louis cooks dinner for Ariel, Grimsby, and Eric, and almost cooks Sebastian for the grand finale ("Les Poissons"/"Les Poissons (Reprise)").

Eric and Ariel spend time together, during which Eric teaches her to dance ("One Step Closer"). Meanwhile, Ursula is anxiously waiting for the three days to end and sends Flotsam and Jetsam to hurry things along ("I Want the Good Times Back (Reprise)"). After a tour of the kingdom, Eric takes Ariel on a quiet boat ride through a lagoon. Sebastian and Scuttle watch anxiously and try to create a romantic atmosphere for Eric to kiss Ariel ("Kiss the Girl"). As they are about to kiss, Flotsam and Jetsam give the boat an "electric shock", scare the animals away, and swim away gloating ("Sweet Child (Reprise)"). As the second day ends, Ariel wishes she had more time and could tell Eric everything, Triton worries about where his daughter has gone and vows to change if she were to return, Sebastian is concerned that Ariel's time as a human is almost up, and Eric still dreams of finding the girl who saved him even though he does not want to lose Ariel ("If Only (Quartet)"). Sebastian returns to the sea and tells an angry King Triton about Ariel's deal with Ursula.

On Ariel's last day as a human, Grimsby has arranged a contest for all foreign princesses to sing for Eric, so he may choose one for his bride ("The Contest"). Eric isn't interested in any of them, and Ariel asks to participate, dancing for him. Eric picks her, but before they can embrace, Ursula appears, declaring that the sun has set and Ariel now belongs to her. Flotsam and Jetsam grab Ariel to take her back to the sea. King Triton arrives to confront his sister, agreeing to take Ariel's place. Ursula claims the trident and declares herself queen ("Poor Unfortunate Souls (Reprise)"). She banishes Triton with a wave of the trident. During a battle with Eric's ship, Ariel grabs Ursula's nautilus shell and regains her voice (which causes a horrified Flotsam and Jetsam to swim away). Ursula begs Ariel to return the shell to her, as her power is contained within it, and even tries to sweet-talk her into doing so, saying she can turn her human again and reunite her with her prince. Ariel is torn, but ultimately destroys the shell just in time, which destroys Ursula and restores King Triton to his throne and daughter.

Eric and Ariel are reunited on the beach, and Eric asks King Triton for his blessing to marry Ariel. King Triton says that it is Ariel's place to answer, and she accepts Eric's proposal. King Triton then says goodbye to his daughter ("If Only (Reprise)"). In honor of his daughter, Triton declares peace between the humans and merfolk. Ariel and Eric are married and sail away on a ship ("Finale").

== Changes from the 1989 film ==
In adapting the film into a live stage musical, the following significant changes are made:

- The shark chase sequence that introduced Ariel and Flounder early in the film has been replaced by a new introductory song for Ariel in which she admires a fork from "The World Above". Other new songs are "Human Stuff", "I Want the Good Times Back", "She's in Love", "Her Voice", "Sweet Child", "Positoovity", "Beyond My Wildest Dreams", "One Step Closer", "If Only" and "The Contest", and some songs from the film are extended, such as "Fathoms Below". "Under the Sea" is the same as the film version, but in the film it was performed while Sebastian is trying to stop Ariel from daydreaming about Eric; in the musical it occurs later, after King Triton destroys Ariel's collection of human things. In some later productions, however, the song is sung to try to stop Ariel from thinking about Eric like in the film.
- The musical depicts Ursula as King Triton's sister, a concept that was included in an early version of the film but did not make the final product. The musical's writer Doug Wright was given the early notes and scripts of the film, and used this element in adapting the story. In the final stage version, Ursula and Triton are explicitly equal, and upon the death of their father, Poseidon, she received a magic nautilus shell while he received the trident. Each ruled half the oceans, until her cruelty and use of black magic led to him deposing her and assuming full reign over the entire ocean world. Her nautilus shell embodies her power, while in the film it was merely a necklace she used to store Ariel's voice. Ursula also uses the shell to spy on Ariel, while in the film she used Flotsam and Jetsam for that purpose. In the musical Ariel defeats her by destroying the shell. She is destroyed when her shell is broken; she does not grow to monstrous proportions as in the film.
- In the reinvented version of the musical, Ursula and Triton had multiple older sisters, who were all killed by Ursula out of jealousy. When Ursula became the ruler of the seven seas, Triton overthrew her and became king, which is why she wants revenge. The magic nautilus shell was a gift to Ursula from Poseidon, to ease his guilt because he didn't give her as much attention as his other daughters. At the climax of the show it's revealed that Ursula is also responsible for the death of Ariel's mother.
- In the musical, the storm at sea sequence is simplified, and Eric merely falls overboard; his sheepdog, Max, is not included, and there is no gunpowder explosion. Ursula's alter ego, Vanessa, is also not included, thereby omitting the subplot of Eric's brainwashing, leading to "The Contest". In the film, Flotsam and Jetsam are killed when Ursula accidentally zaps them with the trident; in the musical they swim away after Ariel takes Ursula's nautilus shell.

== Musical numbers ==
Act I

- "Overture" – Orchestra
- "Fathoms Below" † – Pilot, Prince Eric, Grimsby, Ensemble
- "Daughters of Triton" * – Mersisters
- "The World Above" – Ariel
- "Human Stuff" – Scuttle, Ensemble
- "I Want the Good Times Back" – Ursula, Flotsam, Jetsam, Ensemble
- "Part of Your World" * – Ariel
- "Storm at Sea" – Orchestra
- "Part of Your World (Reprise)" * – Ariel
- "She's in Love" – Mersisters, Flounder
- "Her Voice" – Prince Eric
- "The World Above (Reprise)" – King Triton
- "Under the Sea" * – Sebastian, Ensemble
- "Under the Sea (Reprise)" * – Sebastian, Ensemble
- "Sweet Child" – Flotsam, Jetsam
- "Poor Unfortunate Souls" * – Ursula, Ariel

Act II

- "Entr'acte" – Orchestra
- "Positoovity" – Scuttle, Ensemble
- "Beyond My Wildest Dreams" – Ariel, Carlotta, Ensemble
- "Les Poissons" * – Chef Louis
- "Les Poissons (Reprise)" – Chef Louis, Ensemble
- "One Step Closer" – Prince Eric
- "I Want the Good Times Back (Reprise)" – Ursula, Flotsam, Jetsam
- "Kiss the Girl" * – Sebastian, Ensemble
- "Sweet Child (Reprise)" – Flotsam, Jetsam
- "If Only" (Quartet) – Ariel, Prince Eric, Sebastian, King Triton
- "The Contest" – Grimsby, Ensemble
- "Poor Unfortunate Souls (Reprise)" – Ursula
- "If Only (Reprise)" – King Triton, Ariel
- "Finale" – Prince Eric, Ariel, Ensemble

Original Broadway Production. Lyrics are by Glenn Slater, except as noted:

* Lyrics by Howard Ashman

† Lyrics by Howard Ashman and Glenn Slater

The songs "Where I Belong" (Eric) and Ursula's reprise of "Her Voice" were cut, and the "Finale" was re-worked after the Denver tryout. It included a short reprise of "Fathoms Below". Also, the duet between Ariel and Eric was originally a bit longer with a poetic device about him being her land and her being his sea. Three other songs were cut from the show before the tryout but were available on the leaked demo tape. These included Ursula's "Wasting Away", "All Good Things Must End", and an alternate version of "Poor Unfortunate Souls (Reprise)".

In the Dutch production reinvented by Glenn Casale, a new song called "Daddy's Little Angel" replaced "I Want the Good Times Back", while "Human Stuff" and "Sweet Child (Reprise)" were cut. Ariel sang a reprise of "If Only" after the grotto destruction and the songlist order was substantially altered.

The official version currently licensed for amateur and professional productions incorporates more changes in the songlist order and adds a new reprise of "If Only" in which Triton laments over the loss of his wife. Another difference in this version is the entire omission of the song "The World Above (Reprise)".

== Roles and casts ==
Character	Original Broadway Cast	Character Description	Voice type	Other notable stage performers in noteworthy productions
Ariel	Sierra Boggess	She dreams of life on land instead of "under the sea". She is the youngest daughter of King Triton, and the apparent niece of Ursula.	Mezzo-soprano	Patti Murin, Rachelle Ann Go, Desi Oakley, Kerry Butler, Emma Degerstedt, Sara Bareilles
Ursula	Sherie Rene Scott	She tricks Ariel into trading her voice for a pair of human legs in order to hopefully win Prince Eric's heart, only to attempt to take advantage of Ariel's naivety. She is the apparent sister of King Triton, and aunt of Ariel.	Alto	Faith Prince, Heidi Blickenstaff, Vicki Lewis, Emily Skinner, Rebel Wilson
Prince Eric	Sean Palmer	He is determined to recover the girl that saved him from drowning, ignorant to the fact that it is Ariel, with whom he eventually falls in love.	Tenor	Drew Seeley, Gavin Creel, Michael Maliakel, Guy Zu-Aretz, Erik Santos, Eric Kunze, Nick Adams, Darren Criss
King Triton	Norm Lewis	The strict but caring father of Ariel, and ruler over Atlantica. He originally hates humans, due to the loss of his wife, causing him to commonly reprimand Ariel for her constant human explorations, but eventually realizes it is best to let her follow her dreams. He is the apparent brother of Ursula.	Baritone	Jerry Dixon, Jeff McCarthy, Steve Blanchard, Ben Davis, Terrence Mann, Peter Gallagher, Ken Page
Sebastian	Tituss Burgess	Ariel's musical and practical guardian, Triton's faithful servant, and court composer. He serves as the musical's primary comic relief, and reluctantly assists Ariel in her efforts to charm Prince Eric.	Tenor	Alan Mingo Jr., Francis Jue, James T. Lane, Ken Page, Derrick Baskin
Scuttle	Eddie Korbich	He believes he is an expert on human artifacts, although he is mainly incorrect, and is often consulted by Ariel for information on her discovered "treasures". He also serves as a comic relief, alongside Sebastian.	Tenor	Lara Teeter, Tim Federle
Grimsby	Jonathan Freeman	Prince Eric's faithful servant and friend. Seemingly a close friend of Eric's late father, Grimsby's main initiative is to ensure that Eric marries a princess to maintain his promise to the deceased king. He realizes Ariel is a princess, and is more than happy to let them wed.	Baritone	
Flotsam	Tyler Maynard	One of Ursula's sly and slippery henchmen.	Tenor	
Jetsam	Derrick Baskin	Another one of Ursula's cunning henchmen.	Baritone	Tim Federle
Flounder	Trevor Braun, Brian D'Addario, Cody Hanford, J.J. Singleton †	Ariel's loyal companion. He often accompanies Ariel on her excursions in search of human artifacts.	Boy soprano/Tenor	Henry Hodges, Joshua Colley
Chef Louis	John Treacy Egan	The castle chef, who tries to capture Sebastian and cook him for dinner. He also serves as comic relief.	Tenor	Jimmy Smagula, Lee Roy Reams, Frank Vlastnik, John Stamos, Cheech Marin

† Hanford and Singleton were cast as Flounder but had to leave the show shortly after opening because they had grown taller than Boggess. Braun and D'Addario replaced them. D'Addario was the vocalist on the original cast recording and performed on the show's opening night.

== Instrumentation ==
The orchestration for a stage musical adaptation of the beloved Walt Disney Animation Studios classic was scored on 1 piccolo, 1 flute, 1 alto flute, 1 oboe, 1 cor anglais, 2 clarinets, 1 bass clarinet, 1 soprano saxophone, 1 tenor saxophone, 1 french horn, 1 trumpet, 4 keyboards, 1 double bass, 1 bass guitar, 1 drum kit, 1 timpani, 1 snare drum, 1 bass drum, 1 cymbal, 1 triangle, 1 timbale, 1 woodblock, and 1 tambourine.

== Original Broadway cast recording ==
Disney's The Little Mermaid: Original Broadway Cast Recording is the cast album for the 2008 musical. It was released on February 26, 2008, by Walt Disney Records, produced by Alan Menken and features performances from the show's cast, which includes Boggess, Burgess, Scott, Lewis and Korbich. The recording contains twenty-nine songs from the musical. It was nominated for a Grammy Award. It ranked No. 26 when it entered the Billboard 200 albums chart in March 2008, the second highest position for a cast album in 25 years (after Rent).

All music is composed by Alan Menken and Glenn Slater.

Disney's The Little Mermaid: Original Broadway Cast Recording
No.	Title	Performer(s)	Length
1.	"Overture"	Alan Menken	2:52
2.	"Fathoms Below"	Sean Palmer, Jonathan Freeman, Ensemble	2:34
3.	"Daughters of Triton"	Kay Trinidad, Chelsea Morgan Stock, Cathryn Basile, Zakiya Young Mizen, Michelle Loucadoux, Cicily Daniels, Tituss Burgess	1:19
4.	"The World Above"	Sierra Boggess	1:34
5.	"Human Stuff"	Eddie Korbich, Tituss Burgess, Ensemble	2:31
6.	"I Want the Good Times Back"	Sherie René Scott*, Tyler Maynard, Derrick Baskin	4:57
7.	"Part of Your World"	Sierra Boggess	3:24
8.	"Storm at Sea"	Alan Menken	2:00
9.	"Part of Your World (Reprise)"	Sierra Boggess, Eddie Korbich	2:02
10.	"She's in Love"	Brian D'Addario, Kay Trinidad, Cicily Daniels, Michelle Loucadoux, Zakiya Young Mizen, Chelsea Morgan Stock	3:39
11.	"Her Voice"	Sean Palmer	3:15
12.	"The World Above (Reprise)"	Norm Lewis & Sierra Boggess	1:17
13.	"Under the Sea"	Tituss Burgess, Ensemble	4:06
14.	"Under the Sea (Reprise)"	Tituss Burgess, Ensemble	1:14
15.	"Sweet Child"	Tyler Maynard, Derrick Baskin, Sierra Boggess	1:53
16.	"Poor Unfortunate Souls"	Sherie René Scott, Sierra Boggess	5:20
17.	"Positoovity"	Eddie Korbich, Ensemble	4:04
18.	"Beyond My Wildest Dreams"	Sierra Boggess, Heidi Blickenstaff, Ensemble	3:03
19.	"Les Poissons"	John Treacy Egan	1:54
20.	"Les Poissons (Reprise)"	John Treacy Egan, Ensemble	1:56
21.	"One Step Closer"	Sean Palmer	4:22
22.	"I Want the Good Times Back (Reprise)"	Sherie René Scott, Tyler Maynard, Derrick Baskin	1:38
23.	"Kiss the Girl"	Tituss Burgess, Eddie Korbich, Sean Palmer, Ensemble	3:10
24.	"Sweet Child (Reprise)"	Tyler Maynard, Derrick Baskin	1:12
25.	"If Only (Quartet)"	Sierra Boggess, Sean Palmer, Tituss Burgess, Norm Lewis	4:55
26.	"The Contest"	Jonathan Freeman, Ensemble	1:33
27.	"Poor Unfortunate Souls (Reprise)"	Norm Lewis, Sherie René Scott	1:51
28.	"If Only (Reprise)"	Sierra Boggess, Norm Lewis	1:45
29.	"Finale Ultimo"	Sean Palmer, Sierra Boggess, Company	2:33

== Response ==
Audience response of the targeted family demographic to the musical has been generally positive. Critics gave the show a mixed response, with some praising it, and some calling it "less than witty" and "bloated". Ben Brantley of the New York Times was especially critical, saying that the "charm-free" musical is "stripped of the movie’s generation-crossing appeal. Coherence of plot, endearing quirks of character, even the melodious wit of the original score (supplemented by new, substandard songs...) have been swallowed by an unfocused spectacle." Time Magazine, however, commented, "It was one of the most ravishing things I have ever seen on a Broadway stage."

== Awards and nominations ==
Year	Award Ceremony	Category	Nominee	Result
2008	Tony Awards	Best Original Score	Alan Menken (music), Howard Ashman and Glenn Slater (lyrics)	Nominated
2008	Tony Awards	Best Lighting Design of a Musical	Natasha Katz	Nominated
2008	Drama Desk Awards	Outstanding Actress in a Musical	Sierra Boggess	Nominated
2008	Drama Desk Awards	Outstanding Set Design	George Tsypin	Nominated
2008	Drama Desk Awards	Outstanding Lighting Design	Natasha Katz	Nominated
2008	Outer Critics Circle Awards	Outstanding Featured Actress in a Musical	Sherie Rene Scott	Nominated
2008	Drama League Award	Distinguished Performance Award	Sierra Boggess	Nominated
2008	Grammy Awards	Best Musical Show Album		Nominated
