= Poor Unfortunate Souls =

Song from the Walt Disney Pictures film The Little Mermaid

Single by Pat Carroll

from the album Disney's The Little Mermaid: Original Motion Picture Soundtrack
- Released: 1989
- Genre: Broadway musical-style soundtrack
- Label: Walt Disney Records
- Composer: Alan Menken
- Lyricist: Howard Ashman
- Producers: Menken; Ashman

"Poor Unfortunate Souls" is a song from the Walt Disney Pictures animated film The Little Mermaid. Written by Howard Ashman and Alan Menken and performed by Pat Carroll, "Poor Unfortunate Souls" is sung to Ariel by Ursula the Sea Witch, the film's villainess. In a style that combines Broadway theatre with Burlesque, Ursula uses the song to persuade Ariel into trading her voice for the chance to temporarily become human.

Howard Ashman recorded a version of the song with himself in the role of Ursula, to send to Carroll to convince her to take the role, which it did. This version was released in the four-CD set The Music Behind the Magic. Carroll admits that she borrowed some of the inflections she used in the song from Ashman's performance, and that he had been delighted she had done so.

Carroll's original rendition of "Poor Unfortunate Souls" was included on a 1996 compilation CD of songs performed by or about various Disney villains called Rascal Songs. The CD was released as part of a three-disc Disney song series as a McDonald's promotional item.

== Reprise(s) ==
Four versions of a reprise have been written and produced for Ursula to sing in various incarnations of the Disney story.

A short reprise of this song is featured later in the original Disney movie being sung by Vanessa (Jodi Benson). This reprise is sometimes referred to as "Vanessa's Song". It was included in The Legacy Collection: The Little Mermaid, released as a two-disc album on November 24, 2014, to coincide with the film's twenty-fifth anniversary.

A new reprise was featured in The Little Mermaid Live!, produced in November 2019 and with Queen Latifah in the role of Ursula.

== Covers and other versions ==
Jonas Brothers

"Poor Unfortunate Souls"

Song by Jonas Brothers

from the album Disney's The Little Mermaid special edition soundtrack
- Released: October 3, 2006
- Recorded: 2006
- Length: 2:28
- Label: Walt Disney
- Composer: Alan Menken
- Lyricist: Howard Ashman

The Jonas Brothers covered "Poor Unfortunate Souls" for the Little Mermaid two-disc special edition of the soundtrack, released on October 3, 2006, to correspond with the two-disc The Little Mermaid Platinum Edition DVD. The Special Edition Soundtrack includes a music video for the song, where the boys are singing around the Boring Hills Country Club.

Other appearances

The song is also featured on Disney's On the Record along with "Part of Your World", "Under the Sea" and "Kiss the Girl" of songs from The Little Mermaid.

A portion of the song is performed twice in the Walt Disney World Magic Kingdom Halloween-themed fireworks show HalloWishes during Mickey's Not-So-Scary Halloween Party and in Disneyland's similarly themed Halloween Screams during Mickey's Halloween Party. Also at Walt Disney World, an instrumental snippet of the song is featured in the Electrical Water Pageant to accompany the appearance of a red octopus.

Other performers'

- Actor and singer Tituss Burgess performed the song as part of his set at the 2017 Vulture Festival.
- American singer Michelle Visage performed a parody version, entitled "Poor Unfortunate Queens", during RuPaul's Drag Race Battle of the Seasons Tour.
- A pop rendition is sung by the American actress and singer China Anne McClain, in the Disney Channel Original Movie, Descendants 2.
- The song is featured in the 2023 live-action adaptation of the film, performed by Melissa McCarthy as Ursula. For this new adaptation some of the song's lyrics were updated, with Menken explaining that it was because of "…lines that might make young girls somehow feel that they shouldn't speak out of turn, even though Ursula is clearly manipulating Ariel to give up her voice."

== Certifications ==
Region	Certification	Certified units/sales
United States (RIAA)	Platinum	1,000,000^{‡}
^{‡} Sales+streaming figures based on certification alone.
