= John Treacy Egan =

American actor and singer

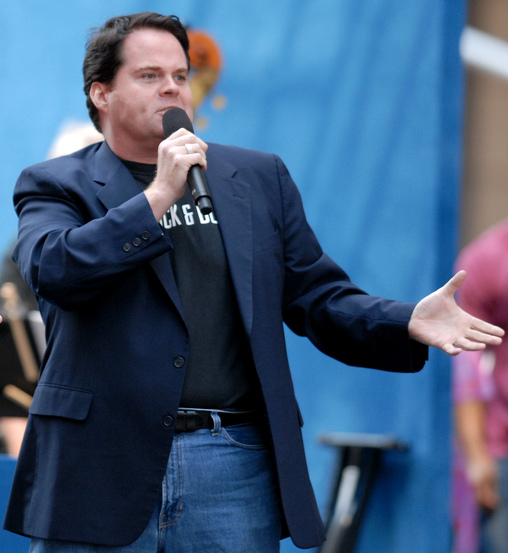
- Egan in 2006
- Born: July 10, 1962 (age 64); New York City, New York, U.S.
- Education: SUNY Purchase
- Occupations: Singer, actor
- Years active: 1996–present

John Treacy Egan (born July 10, 1962) is an American actor and singer known for starring in the Broadway productions of The Producers and The Little Mermaid.

== Early life ==
Egan was born in New York City. He attended the Rye Country Day School and graduated from SUNY Purchase.

== Career ==
Egan first appeared off-Broadway in When Pigs Fly at the Douglas Fairbanks Theater in 1996. In 1997 Egan made his Broadway debut in Jekyll & Hyde, playing the roles of Groom and Mike while understudying Utterson, Glossop, and the Bishop. He is also in the film version Broadway Television Networks/Atlantic Recordings.

In 2001, Egan was in the Off-Broadway show Bat Boy: The Musical. Also in 2001, Egan appeared as Hortensio in Kiss Me, Kate at the Shubert Theatre in Los Angeles. Egan then starred in the musical The Producers. He played Franz Liebkind from May 2002 to April 2003 and then took over the role of Roger De Bris from April to October. He returned to the show a year later, playing Max Bialystock for one week in December 2004.

On November 1, 2005, he officially took over the role of Max, and he played the role through the end of the Broadway run in 2007 (except for a break of several months in 2006, in which sitcom star Tony Danza assumed the role). He is currently the only actor to have played three principal roles in the musical. Egan was also in the 2005 film The Producers with Nathan Lane and Matthew Broderick, as First Nighter. Egan appeared with Josh Groban in the Actors Fund Benefit Concert of Chess on September 22, 2003, at the New Amsterdam Theatre.

In 2007, he originated the role of Chef Louis in The Little Mermaid. From October 2009 to January 2010, Egan played a parent and reporter in the Roundabout Theatre Company's Broadway production of Bye Bye Birdie. He then played Joey in the Tony Award-nominated musical Sister Act on Broadway, from April 2011 to August 2012. In the early 2010s, he was in concert versions of Oliver! at the Shubert Theatre as Mr. Bumble and Guys and Dolls at Carnegie Hall playing Nicely-Nicely Johnson. In 2023, he played Vlad in the regional premiere of Anastasia. In February 2024, he began performances as Colonel Mustard in the national tour of Clue: On Stage.

John released his first solo CD, Count The Stars, in April 2008. His second solo CD, On Christmas Morning, was released in October 2009.

Egan was in the movie Last Night with Eva Mendes and Keira Knightley. He has appeared on 30 Rock, Law & Order, As the World Turns, and Late Night with Conan O'Brien.

Egan contributed to the cast albums of When Pigs Fly, Jekyll & Hyde, Bat Boy, and The Little Mermaid as well as the 2005 soundtrack for film remake of The Producers.
