= The Little Mermaid (1989 soundtrack) =

The Little Mermaid: Original Motion Picture Soundtrack

Soundtrack album by Various Artists
- Released: October 19, 1989
- Studios: Evergreen Studios, Los Angeles
- Genres: Broadway musical-style soundtrack, film score, classical music, calypso
- Length: 43:18
- Label: Walt Disney
- Producers: Alan Menken; Howard Ashman; Robert Kraft

1997 Re-release

2006 Special Edition

Singles from The Little Mermaid: Original Walt Disney Records Soundtrack
- 1. "Poor Unfortunate Souls" Released: 1989; 2. "Part of Your World" Released: October 13, 1989; 3. "Under the Sea" Released: December 13, 1989

Singles from The Little Mermaid: An Original Walt Disney Records Soundtrack (Special Edition)
- 1. "Kiss the Girl" Released: September 4, 2006 (Radio Disney)

The Little Mermaid: Original Motion Picture Soundtrack is the soundtrack to the 1989 Disney animated film The Little Mermaid. It contains the songs from the film composed by Alan Menken and Howard Ashman, as well as the film's score composed by Alan Menken. The score was orchestrated by Thomas Pasatieri. The score’s orchestral recording was conducted by J.A.C. Redford, who also contributed much to the music composition. The album has achieved multi-platinum sales and won the Grammy Award for Best Recording for Children. The album includes recordings of the music that won the Grammy for Best Instrumental Composition Written for a Motion Picture or for Television ("Under the Sea"), the Academy Awards for Best Original Score and Best Original Song ("Under the Sea") and the Golden Globe Award for Best Original Score.

The soundtrack was first released by Walt Disney Records on October 19, 1989, on both CD and cassette tape. The album was also included in a four-disc box set entitled The Music Behind the Magic: The Musical Artistry of Alan Menken, Howard Ashman & Tim Rice, which was released on November 22, 1994. The box set included work tapes and demos intertwined into the finished original soundtrack. The soundtrack (without the demos and work tapes) was re-released with different artwork, on October 14, 1997, and it was released internationally on October 31, 2000, in a double pack with The Little Mermaid II soundtrack. On October 3, 2006, a new two-disc special edition version of the soundtrack was released to correspond with the two-disc Platinum Edition DVD release of The Little Mermaid. The first disc remains identical to the original release, yet with remastered audio while the newly added second disc is composed of various newly recorded versions of the film's songs by different artists, such as Ashley Tisdale, Raven-Symoné, the Jonas Brothers, and Jessica Simpson. It also included two music videos, as well as new cover art. The Legacy Collection: The Little Mermaid was released as a two-disc album on November 24, 2014, to coincide with the film's twenty-fifth anniversary.

== Reception ==
Professional ratings
Review scores
Source	Rating
AllMusic	4.5/5 stars
Filmtracks	4/5 stars

As of February 2007, the album is certified 6× Platinum by the RIAA. In 2010, Rhapsody called it one of the all-time great Disney and/or Pixar soundtracks.

== Track listing ==
All lyrics are written by Howard Ashman; all music is composed by Alan Menken.

No.	Title	Recording artist(s)	Length
1.	"Fathoms Below"	Ship's Chorus	1:41
2.	"Main Titles" (Score)		1:26
3.	"Fanfare" (Score)		0:27
4.	"Daughters of Triton"	Kimmy Robertson	0:38
5.	"Part of Your World"	Jodi Benson	3:13
6.	"Under the Sea"	Samuel E. Wright & Choir	3:12
7.	"Part of Your World (Reprise)"	Jodi Benson	2:15
8.	"Poor Unfortunate Souls"	Pat Carroll	4:49
9.	"Les Poissons"	René Auberjonois	1:33
10.	"Kiss the Girl"	Samuel E. Wright & Choir	2:41
11.	"Fireworks" (Score)		0:38
12.	"Jig" (Score)		1:32
13.	"The Storm" (Score)		3:18
14.	"Destruction of the Grotto" (Score)		1:52
15.	"Flotsam and Jetsam" (Score)		1:22
16.	"Tour of the Kingdom" (Score)		1:24
17.	"Bedtime" (Score)		1:20
18.	"Wedding Announcement" (Score)		2:16
19.	"Eric to the Rescue" (Score)		3:40
20.	"Happy Ending"	Disney Chorus	3:11
Total length:			43:18

Australian Bonus Track
No.	Title	Recording artist(s)	Length
21.	"Part of Your World"	Alana De Roma	3:16

The Music Behind the Magic box set track listing
No.	Title	Recording artist(s)	Length
1.	"Fathoms Below/Main Title" (Demo)	Menken, Ashman	4:41
2.	"Fathoms Below" (Final)	Ship's Chorus	1:41
3.	"Main Title" (Final) (Score)		1:26
4.	"Fanfare" (Final) (Score)		0:27
5.	"Daughters of Triton"	Robertson	0:38
6.	"Part of Your World" (Work Tape)	Menken, Ashman	0:45
7.	"Part of Your World" (Demo)	Menken	0:49
8.	"Part of Your World" (Final)	Benson	3:13
9.	"Fireworks" (Final) (Score)		0:38
10.	"Jig" (Final) (Score)		1:32
11.	"Under the Sea" (Work Tape)	Menken, Ashman	1:20
12.	"Under the Sea" (Demo)	Ashman	2:34
13.	"Under the Sea" (Final)	Samuel E. Wright	3:12
14.	"Sebastian and Triton" (Final) (Score)		1:43
15.	"Part of Your World" (Reprise) (Demo)	Menken	1:34
16.	"The Storm" (Final) (Score)		3:18
17.	"Part of Your World" (Reprise) (Final)	Benson	2:15
18.	"Silence Is Golden" (Demo)	Menken	2:37
19.	"Poor Unfortunate Souls" (Demo)	Ashman	5:07
20.	"Poor Unfortunate Souls" (Final)	Pat Carroll	4:49
21.	"Les Poissons" (Demo)	Ashman	2:09
22.	"Les Poissons"	René Auberjonois	1:33
23.	"Kiss the Girl" (Demo)	Ashman	1:05
24.	"Kiss the Girl" (Final)	Samuel E. Wright	1:37
25.	"Bedtime" (Final) (Score)		1:20
26.	"Wedding Announcement" (Final) (Score)
27.	Untitled		2:16
28.	"Eric to the Rescue" (Final) (Score)		3:40
29.	"Part of Your World/Happy Ending" (Work Tape) (Final)	Menken, Disney Chorus	2:34

Disc Two (Special Edition)
No.	Title	Recording artist(s)	Length
1.	"Kiss the Girl"	Ashley Tisdale	3:25
2.	"Poor Unfortunate Souls"	Jonas Brothers	2:29
3.	"Part of Your World"	Jessica Simpson	3:29
4.	"Under the Sea"	Raven-Symoné	3:16
5.	"Poor Unfortunate Souls" (Music Video Enhanced feature)	Jonas Brothers	2:29
6.	"Making of "Kiss the Girl" Music Video" (Enhanced feature)	Ashley Tisdale	1:03

Legacy Collection Disc 1
No.	Title	Performer(s)	Length
1.	"Fathoms Below"	Ship's Chorus	1:42
2.	"Main Titles"		1:26
3.	"Fanfare"		0:28
4.	"Daughters of Triton"	Kimmy Robertson	0:52
5.	"Intro Ariel"		3:12
6.	"Intro Ursula"		2:38
7.	"Triton Reprimands"		1:49
8.	"Sebastian's Dilemma"		0:44
9.	"Part of Your World"	Jodi Benson	3:31
10.	"Fireworks"		2:11
11.	"The Storm"		3:18
12.	"Part of Your World (Reprise) / Ursula Plots"	Jodi Benson	3:03
13.	"Ariel in Love"		0:23
14.	"Under the Sea"	Samuel E. Wright	3:23
15.	"Sebastian and Triton"		1:40
16.	"Destroying the Grotto"		1:55
17.	"Flotsam and Jetsam"		1:47
18.	"Ursula's Lair"		2:17
19.	"Poor Unfortunate Souls"	Pat Carroll	4:49
20.	"She's Got Legs"		1:22
21.	"Sebastian Relents"		0:28
22.	"On Land"		2:25
23.	"Miss Manners"		1:09
24.	"Les Poissons"	René Auberjonois	2:11
25.	"Crab On a Plate / Bedtime"		2:20
26.	"Tour of the Kingdom"		1:26
27.	"Kiss the Girl"	Samuel E. Wright	2:40
28.	"Ariel Left Behind"		4:09
29.	"Poor Unfortunate Souls (Reprise)"	Jodi Benson	0:31
30.	"The Truth"		1:23
31.	"Interrupting the Wedding / Ursula's Defeat"		6:44
32.	"Happy Ending"		3:22
Total length:			71:18

Legacy Collection Disc 2
No.	Title	Performer(s)	Length
1.	"Fathoms Below (Work Tape)"	Howard Ashman and Alan Menken	2:15
2.	"Daughters of Triton (Synth Demo)"	Howard Ashman and Alan Menken	0:56
3.	"Part of Your World (Synth Demo)"	Howard Ashman and Alan Menken	3:15
4.	"Fireworks / Jig (Score Piano)"	Alan Menken	2:10
5.	"The Storm (Score Piano Demo)"	Alan Menken	2:35
6.	"Under the Sea (Synth Demo)"	Howard Ashman and Alan Menken	4:42
7.	"Poor Unfortunate Souls (Basic Synth Demo)"	Howard Ashman and Alan Menken	5:06
8.	"Poor Unfortunate Souls (Final Synth Mockup)"	Howard Ashman and Alan Menken	5:31
9.	"Les Poissons (Work Tape Demo)"	Howard Ashman and Alan Menken	2:09
10.	"Les Poissons (Synth Demo)"	Howard Ashman and Alan Menken	2:03
11.	"Kiss the Girl (Synth Demo B)"	Howard Ashman and Alan Menken	2:41
12.	"Happy Ending (Score Piano Demo)"	Alan Menken	2:32
Total length:			35:55

== Score composition and orchestration ==
Alan Menken's first songs-and-underscore project garnered him an Academy Award for the Best Score of 1989. This would prove to give him a very high nomination-to-win ratio of awards. Menken was originally hired for the songs only, but after writing an underscore demo for the film's executives, his assignment grew. The following are some details on the film's score overall:

- The most common key signature in this score is G major (including "Main Titles", the beginning portion of "Happy Ending", "Les Poissons", "Bedtime", and most instances of Ariel's solo aria). "Tour of the Kingdom" alternates between G major and E major throughout.
- In darker moments, and for Ursula's theme, the key of G minor is prominent ("Poor Unfortunate Souls (Reprise)", most of "The Storm", "Eric to the Rescue" among others).
- The French horn is used to symbolize King Triton (listen to "Destruction of the Grotto"), the oboe is used to symbolize Prince Eric (the beginning of "The Storm", as well as "Happy Ending" when Ariel is looking at Eric on the shore). Usually, the brass section represents Ursula and the flute almost always portrays Ariel's vocal aria. Clarinets represent Scuttle.
- Synthesizers and electric pianos are used quite often in the orchestration (namely for the songs, such as "Part of Your World"), but the grand piano is almost never used.
- Scuttle's leitmotif can be heard in the beginning of "Wedding Announcement", the scene after Ariel becomes a human and was the basis for "Beyond My Wildest Dreams" in the 2007 broadway production. The Scuttle leitmotif is presented in a minor key variation during the Stalling the Wedding scenes.
- Ursula's leitmotif is most obvious in the track "Flotsam and Jetsam" but it comes from the melody notes for the chorus of "Poor Unfortunate Souls". This theme is also used while Ariel is being transformed, and it is played fast and supported by a harsh brass section.

== Cue List ==
The following is a list of the official cue names and numbers as used in the handwritten orchestra score for recording purposes. In the Legacy Collection soundtrack version, some cues were merged into one track (i.e. 9m1, 9m2, 9m2a, 9m3, 9m4 and 9m5 are one track titled "The Truth").

Cue List
1M1 Fathoms Below
1M2 Opening Credits
1M3S Fanfare
1M5 Daughters of Triton
1M6 Triton (Sting)
1M7 Intro Ariel
1M7A Shark Chase
2M0 Intro Scuttle
2M1 Intro Ursula
2M2 Triton Reprimands Ariel
2m2 Insert
2m3 You're Just the Crab
2m3 Insert
2m4 Sebastian's Dilemma
2m5 Sebastian Discovers
2m5 Sebastian Discovers (ver 2)
2m6 Part of Your World
3m1 Fireworks
3m2 Gigue
3m3 She's Out There
3m4 Storm
4m1 Is He Dead?
4m2 Part of Your World (Reprise)
4m3 Ursula Plots
4m3a Bucolic
4m4 Ariel in Love
4m5 Under the Sea
4m5a Under the Sea (Tag)
5m1 Sebastian and Triton
5m2 It's a Surprise
5m3 Destroying the Grotto
5m4 Flotsam and Jetsam
6m1 The Deal (Insert)
6M1 The Deal
6m1r (To Ursula's Lair)
6m1a (alternate)
6m1a Insert
6m2 Poor Unfortunate Souls (Part 1)
6m3 Poor Unfortunate Souls (Part 2)
6m4 Poor Unfortunate Souls (Part 3)
6m4a Beluga Sevruga
6m5 Fife 1
6m6 She's Got Legs
6m7 Sebastian Relents
7m1 Eric Finds Ariel
7m2 The Bath
7m3 Dead Fish (Sting)
7m4 Miss Manners
7m5 (Louis Singing)
7m6 Les Poissons
7m6a Can-Can
7m7 Button
7m8 Crab on the Plate
7m9 Bedtime
7m10/8m0 Messenger and Triton
8m1 Tour of the Kingdom
8m2 (Scuttle Singing)
8m3 Kiss the Girl
8m4 Ursula Transforms
8m5 Fife 2
8m6 Eric Hears Maiden
8m7 Wedding Announcement
8m8 Ariel Left Behind
8m9 (Scuttle Singing)
8m10 Poor Unfortunate Souls (Reprise)
9m1 The Truth
9m2 Wedding March
9m2a Almost There
9m3 The Attack
9m4 Ariel's Voice Returns
9m5 You're Too Late
9m6 Eric to the Rescue
9m6a Ursula Rising
9m6b Whirlpool
10m1 Peace Returns
10m2 Happy Ending

== Chart ==
=== Weekly charts ===
Year(s)	Chart	Peak position
1989	US Billboard 200	32
1991	Swiss Albums (Schweizer Hitparade)	25
2006, 2012	US Top Soundtracks (Billboard)	4

=== Year-end charts ===
Chart (2023)	Position
US Top Soundtracks (Billboard)	23

== Certifications ==
Region	Certification	Certified units/sales
Canada (Music Canada)	3× Platinum	300,000^{^}
Germany (BVMI)	3× Gold	750,000^{^}
United Kingdom (BPI) sales since 1992	Gold	100,000^{^}
United States (RIAA)	6× Platinum	6,000,000^{^}
^{^} Shipments figures based on certification alone.

== See also ==
- The Music Behind the Magic
- Walt Disney Records: The Legacy Collection
- The Little Mermaid (2023 soundtrack)
