= Part of Your World =

Song from Disney's The Little Mermaid

Song by Jodi Benson

from the album The Little Mermaid: Original Motion Picture Soundtrack
- Released: October 13, 1989
- Recorded: August 16, 1989
- Length: 3:16
- Label: Walt Disney
- Composer: Alan Menken
- Lyricist: Howard Ashman
- Producers: Ashman; Menken

"Part of Your World" is a song written by lyricist Howard Ashman and composer Alan Menken for Disney's animated feature film The Little Mermaid (1989). Performed by American actress and singer Jodi Benson in the titular role as Ariel, a mermaid princess, "Part of Your World" is a power ballad in which the main character expresses her strong desire to become human; its lyrics use placeholder names in lieu of several human-related terms that would be unfamiliar to a mermaid. The film's theme song is later reprised by Ariel after she rescues Eric, a human prince with whom she has fallen in love, from drowning.

Directly influenced by Broadway and musical theatre, Ashman strongly believed that The Little Mermaid would benefit from an "I Want" song–a musical number during which the main character sings about what they hope to accomplish by the end of their story. Directors Ron Clements and John Musker originally asked Ashman to write a song for Ariel in which she expresses her romantic feelings for Prince Eric, but the lyricist felt that a song that details the character's fascination with the human world would better serve the film's plot. Ashman recruited Benson, with whom he had previously collaborated on the stage musical Smile (1986), to record "Part of Your World", and worked closely with her to ensure that she delivered a desirable performance. Disney executive Jeffrey Katzenberg initially ordered that "Part of Your World" be removed from the final film due to concerns that the ballad would bore young children. However, Ashman, Clements, Musker and animator Glen Keane ultimately convinced Katzenberg that "Part of Your World" is essential to the film's narrative, and the song was spared after audiences appeared to enjoy it during a subsequent test screening.

"Part of Your World" has garnered critical acclaim; both film and music critics praised the song's quality and Benson's vocal performance. Several media publications agree that "Part of Your World" ranks among the greatest Disney songs ever written, and credit the success of the ballad with making "I Want" songs a standard component of future animated musical films. Critics have offered various interpretations of the song's empowering lyrics, ranging from seeking independence from overprotective parents to feminism. In addition to becoming Benson's signature song, which she continues to perform live, "Part of Your World" has been covered extensively by several artists of various genres, including Faith Hill, Jessica Simpson, Skye Sweetnam, Miley Cyrus, Bruno Mars, Carly Rae Jepsen, Jessie J, Olivia Newton-John, and Sara Bareilles. Actress Sierra Boggess debuted the song in the stage musical adaptation of the film, for which she originated the role of Ariel. Halle Bailey performed the song as Ariel in the 2023 live-action film adaptation of the film.

== Writing and recording ==
"Part of Your World" was written in 1986 by lyricist Howard Ashman and composer Alan Menken. It was the first song they wrote for The Little Mermaid, although Menken had not officially been enlisted as Ashman's composer when the song was first conceived. Directly inspired by some of Broadway's most successful musicals, Ashman believed The Little Mermaid's story would benefit from a song that serves as its heroine's "inner diary of thoughts". Having always intended for Ariel to perform a song in her grotto, Ashman suggested a song about her fascination with the human world. He explained to the filmmakers that "Part of Your World" would be Ariel's "I Want" song, likening it to moments in stage musicals when the heroine sings about her dreams so the audience can begin caring about the character and her journey. Menken believes Disney had not yet included explicit "I Want" songs in the studio's films prior to The Little Mermaid, making "Part of Your World" the first time one had been written intentionally for a Disney film. However, Disney princesses had technically been singing "I Want" songs since Snow White and the Seven Dwarfs (1937) and Cinderella (1950). Observing structural similarities between the song and "Somewhere That's Green" from their musical Little Shop of Horrors (1982), the songwriters nicknamed "Part of Your World" "Somewhere That's Wet" because they believe it resembles an "underwater version" of the Little Shop of Horrors song. Additionally, Ashman had written a song entitled "Disneyland" with composer Marvin Hamlisch for their Broadway musical Smile (1986) in which a young girl, much like Ariel, sings about regularly watching Disney anthology series as a means of escaping her troubled childhood. Menken identified the musical motif he composed for the beginning of the ballad as his favorite part of the song. Ashman debuted "Part of Your World" for directors Ron Clements and John Musker at his home. Only the directors' second time meeting Ashman and first time meeting Menken, Menken provided the piano accompaniment while Ashman sang Ariel's melody himself, instead of their traditional method of Menken singing lead vocals.

Clements and Musker enjoyed the song but disagreed with some of Ashman's lyrics. Musker specifically wanted to change the line "I wanna be where the people are" because he felt it sounded too political, suggesting that "the" be removed. Ashman insisted that the line remain unchanged to prevent the word "where" from needing to be held longer; Musker eventually admitted his suggestion was "idiotic". Although Ashman typically dismissed most of the directors' suggestions, he agreed to revise lyrics that originally described the contents of Ariel's grotto using eloquent terms such as "fine china" and "books bound in leather and gold", and replaced them with words that would be more familiar to a mermaid who learns about humans from an uneducated seagull named Scuttle. Ashman's revisions integrated funnier lyrics such as "thingamabobs" and "whozits and whatzits" into the song, making "Part of Your World" more consistent with the film's lighthearted tone. He initially pitched Ariel's reprise of "Part of Your World" as a sad lament in which the character sings "I'll never be...part of that world", but Clements and Musker argued that the reprise should instead convey Ariel's determined nature as she decides to pursue her dream of becoming part of Eric's world. Howard agreed to rewrite the reprise into a more positive anthem that ultimately reads "I don't know when, I don't know how, but I know something's starting right now...Watch and you'll see...someday I'll be...part of your world", providing the film with more momentum while establishing further conflict between Ariel and her father King Triton. Ashman's willingness to rewrite both versions of the song's lyrics pleasantly surprised the directors.

Ashman had met actress and singer Jodi Benson while directing her in Smile; she had also performed "Disneyland" in the show. After the production closed, Ashman invited Smile's entire female cast to audition for The Little Mermaid using "Part of Your World", although he did not disclose the name of the project. Ashman mailed a copy of his demo of "Part of Your World" to Benson, to which she listened in preparation for her audition. Benson then recorded a brief sample of the song on a reel-to-reel tape with casting director Albert Tavares, which she mailed to Disney. All audition tapes were left unidentified so that the candidates would remain anonymous to Musker and Clements, delighting Ashman when the directors ultimately selected Benson's tape to be the voice of Ariel, about which she was informed one year after submitting the tape. Her first voice acting role, for which she had to be carefully trained on properly projecting into the studio microphone, Benson found the process of recording "Part of Your World" somewhat difficult after Ashman instructed her to approach it as though she was reciting a monologue as opposed to singing a song. Despite being frustrated because she longed "to sing the crap out of it", she found Ashman telling her exactly how he wanted her to perform his lyrics beneficial to her entire performance. Ashman remained in the recording booth with Benson during the entire recording process, advising her on performing the song with realism and intensity as opposed to belting it and whispering lines to her as she sang them, as Benson sometimes struggled with over-singing. Recorded on August 16, 1989, it was rare for a filmmaker to direct a performer from within the booth, requiring Ashman to move carefully to prevent his gestures from being recorded by the microphone. According to Benson, some of Ashman's breathing can still be heard on the final track. Initially struggling to capture Ariel's "tomboyish-ness and yearning", Benson requested that the studio's lights be dimmed to simulate the feeling of being underwater. Menken and Ashman deliberately selected segments from Benson's recording session that "are not perfectly sung" to include in the final version, ranging from unsustained, incorrect notes lacking in vibrato to spoken words, because the songwriters wanted her performance to sound as "real" as possible.

== Context ==
=== Background and animation ===
The scene in which the camera is animated to appear as though it is rotating around Ariel as she sings proved challenging for the animators.

Although Clements and Musker had originally intended to hire animator Glen Keane to animate Ursula due to his history of animating Disney villains, Keane specifically requested that he be allowed to animate Ariel after hearing Benson sing "Part of Your World" for the first time. Captivated by her performance, he decided to make the scene his most important assignment, volunteering to animate the entire "Part of Your World" musical sequence himself and becoming its lead animator. Animating one particular scene to appear as though the camera is rotating around Ariel while she sings "Look at this trove, treasures untold. How many wonders can one cavern hold?" was particularly challenging for the animators to perfect without the aid of computer animation, taking them considerably longer to complete. Keane described the song as the moment "the audience starts thinking of Ariel as this real, living thing. A girl who's dreaming of something more. And since so many of us feel just like that ... that's when the audience falls in love with this character."

Ashman was aware that writing a ballad capable of captivating young audiences during the "modern era" of animation would be challenging. In an effort to keep children interested, Ashman suggested that Ariel should own a grotto in which she hides human artifacts she has collected from various shipwrecks and refer to them throughout the scene. Disney executive Jeffrey Katzenberg ordered that "Part of Your World" be removed from the film after observing that some children appeared to grow restless during the sparsely animated musical sequence while attending an early test screening of The Little Mermaid. One child in particular spilled his popcorn during the scene, which measured three minutes and forty-three seconds at the time, prompting Katzenberg to worry that children would find the song uninteresting. Bored by "Part of Your World" himself, Katzenberg felt that the ballad only slowed down the film.

Nearly everyone involved in the project protested and defended "Part of Your World"; Ashman reportedly voiced that the song could only be removed over his dead body, delivering an ultimatum and threatening to depart from the project altogether should Katzenberg proceed. Ashman argued that audiences would struggle to "root for" and fall in love with Ariel should the song be discarded. Clements and Musker reminded Katzenberg that Snow White and the Seven Dwarfs, Disney's first animated film, features a song similar to "Part of Your World" entitled "Someday My Prince Will Come" which ultimately became very successful. The directors also reminded him that MGM executives had wanted to remove Judy Garland's song "Over the Rainbow" from the film The Wizard of Oz (1939) until they reconsidered. Keane argued that "Part of Your World" is essential to the film's narrative and eventually convinced Katzenberg to let the sequence remain at least until the film's next test screening, by which time it would be fully animated. Children responded better towards the song during the second screening, some of whom enjoyed it to the point of which they mimed some of its lyrics. The song even moved some older audience members to tears, who ultimately applauded. "Part of Your World" was ultimately spared; Katzenberg eventually admitted that he now feels embarrassed that he had ever wanted to dismiss "Part of Your World", expressing gratitude towards the fact that no one agreed with him at the time because he is now unable to imagine The Little Mermaid without the song.

=== Sequence and use in The Little Mermaid ===
Set prior to most of the film's action, "Part of Your World" is the second proper song in The Little Mermaid, and takes place in Ariel's grotto before she meets Eric. A character song used to progress the plot, "Part of Your World" resembles a monologue in which Ariel expresses her desire to become part of the human world while reveling in her expansive collection of discarded human items and artifacts. Singing about her interest in exploring the human world and learning as much as she can about it, Ariel performs the ballad. She sings while gazing up towards the surface longingly, wishing that she could be human herself and live among other humans, and refusing to believe that they are as horrible as her father describes them. "Part of Your World" reveals that Ariel feels suppressed and unhappy in her current environment despite her belongings and royal lineage, "want[ing] to be a part of something else." A wind-up toy resembling a woman dancing is used to demonstrate that Ariel would much rather be like her. The character also sings the line "What's a fire and why does it ... What's the word? Burn!" to Georges de La Tour's painting Magdalene with the Smoking Flame to indicate a similar sentiment.

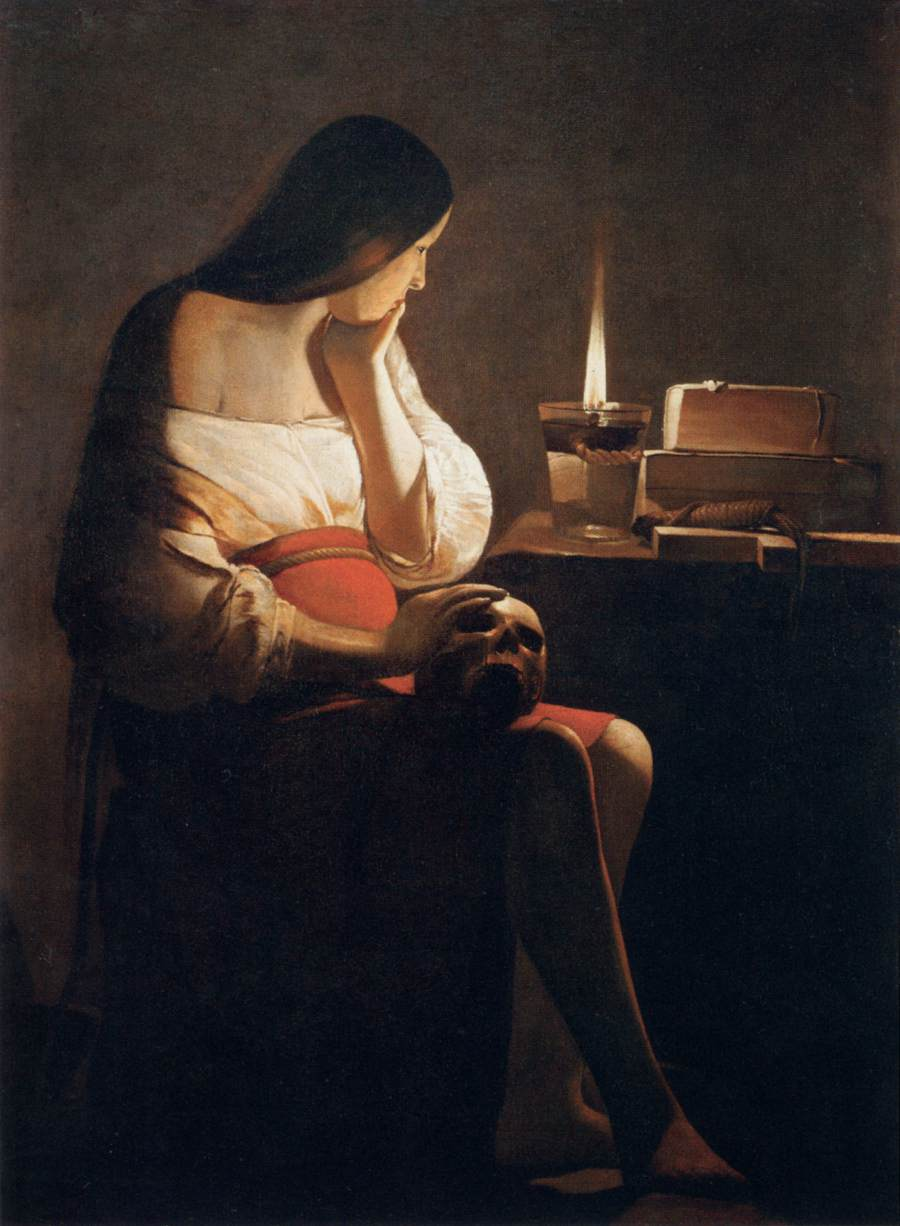
Georges de La Tour's painting Magdalene with the Smoking Flame (1640) is shown during a portion of the song

Offering character development, the song explores and voices the inner goings-on of Ariel's mind. Ariel's craving for adventure makes it difficult for the character to enjoy her current surroundings while knowing there is much left for her to explore, causing her to grow increasingly despondent; "change", a non-physical concept that can not be purchased or stolen, is the only thing that could make her truly happy. In the meantime, Ariel uses material belongings to fill the void of what is missing from her life, attempting to live among humans vicariously via what she has salvaged from sunken ships. Voicing her frustration over being confined to the ocean, Ariel is not shy about what she wants, choosing to belt out her desires instead. The Animated Movie Guide author Jerry Beck wrote that the song "capture's Ariel's yearning so intensely that when she extends her hand toward the surface we long to reach out with her", ending with Ariel gesturing while sighing longingly and descending back down to the ocean floor.

"Part of Your World" serves as The Little Mermaid's theme song. The entire film is defined around "Part of Your World", which provides the film with momentum within its first 15 minutes. As "the heart and centre of the score", several instrumental versions of "Part of Your World" are heard throughout the film in the form of a leitmotif, overtures incorporated into its orchestral score. Although the theme belongs to Ariel, it remains "the film's most consistent thematic idea" and is thus manipulated throughout The Little Mermaid to various affects for other characters as well that range from melancholic to sinister. The film's main title is a choral arrangement of the ballad, performed without any lyrics. After Ariel rescues Eric and returns him to safety on a nearby beach, she sings a shorter reprise of "Part of Your World" to him as he regains consciousness. A distorted version of "Part of Your World" plays while Triton destroys Ariel's items, Eric constantly plays the melody on his flute to show that he continues to be haunted by the memory of the mysterious girl who saved his life, and a brass arrangement of the song is heard while Ursula magically transforms into a human named "Vanessa" in order to trick Eric into marrying her. Lastly, a final choral version, entitled "Happy Ending", is performed after Ariel and Eric's wedding.

=== Interpretations ===
Crystal Bell of MTV wrote that the ballad "gives Ariel a purpose, reveals her deepest desire—to be where the people are—and shows us a glimpse of her strengths, vulnerabilities, and individual quirks", while establishing Ariel as an outsider. Writing for The Atlantic, Akash Nikolas agreed that as the film's "I Want" song, "Part of Your World" follows Disney's trend of establishing the main character as an outcast "set apart from society by some innate desire" as Ariel literally longs to be belong to a different world. Film critic Theresa Basile identified "Part of Your World" as a song that belongs to an adventurer who wants to explore new environments. Zaron Burnett III, writing for Thought Catalog, described the selection as a ballad in which "a curious young woman ... who doesn't fully understand the world she longs to be a part of, bravely dreams of how she can move into a new world, and reject the limitations of her father's world (read: patriarchy)", identifying Ariel as "a young feminist". Meanwhile, the New York Daily News film critic Kathleen Carroll identified "Part of Your World" as a "typically plaintive solo" that helps establish Ariel as a Broadway ingenue. Distinguished from earlier "wish songs" that discuss searching for "happiness in everyday life", "Part of Your World" is about longing to abandon normalcy in favor of seeking happiness elsewhere. Comparing "Part of Your World" to "A Dream Is a Wish Your Heart Makes" from Cinderella, Entertainment Weekly writer Esther Zuckerman observed that the song proves how different Ariel is from Disney princesses by whom she was preceded. While Cinderella's "A Dream Is a Wish Your Heart Makes" is a passive song performed in third person, Ariel's number "is brimming with agency" to demonstrate the character's thirst for knowledge. Zuckerman credits Ashman's lyrics with providing Ariel with a personality, something she believes Snow White, Cinderella and Aurora from Sleeping Beauty (1959) lacked, while giving Ariel a motive that is not romance-oriented. Additionally, "Part of Your World" is delivered directly to the camera as opposed to an audience of woodland animals; Ariel appears as though she is speaking directly to young girls who are watching the scene.

The context of "Part of Your World" and the fact that it occurs before Ariel meets and falls in love with Eric is often used to defend Ariel against critics who accuse her of sacrificing her talents for a man. Boing Boing's Caroline Siede explained that Ariel "just happens to end up with a prince in the process of achieving her larger dream" to become human. Writing for Yahoo! Movies, Gwynne Watkins penned "There's little doubt that Ariel's crush on Prince Eric strengthens her resolve to be part of the human world. But crucially, her love of 'the world above' is established long before she sets eyes on the prince" during "Part of Your World". Laura Stampler, writing for Time, agreed that the character "[fell] in love with the human world before she even knew who Eric was" because "she has always dreamed of being a 'part of your world'". Ariel sings "Bright young women, sick of swimmin', ready to stand" to indicate that she fantasizes about "living in a feminist-friendly society where she can speak her mind freely and grow intellectually", demonstrating envy towards women who are capable of doing this on land. However, Time's Laura Stampler joked that Ariel will find the human world disappointing "considering my dad definitely still reprimanded me (even though I had legs)." In the reprise, the lyrics "part of that world" are replaced with "part of your world" to distinguish that the character is now referring to her feelings for Eric, whom Ariel had not yet met when she sang the original song.

== Composition ==
=== Music ===
Written in the key of F major at a "moderately bright" tempo of 135, "Part of Your World" is a yearning, downtempo Broadway and musical theatre-influenced power ballad, that gradually crescendos into a "showstopping" conclusion, bolstered by Benson's "powerhouse performance". Variety's Andrew Barker summarized "Part of Your World" as a "slow-building, Broadway-style showstopper" that "moves effortlessly from busy, literate verses to a longing pre-chorus and a belted-to-the-rafters refrain", incorporating "dramatic" violins into its orchestration. Described as a "big ballad", the song pairs Ashman's lyrics about pining for life on land with Menken's "soaring melody", beginning with a musical motif that resembles the sound of flowing water, described by D23 as "tinkling piano keystrokes". Both the song's music and vocals swell with "passion and longing".

Vocally, Benson performs "Part of Your World" using a whispered, "intense" singing voice as opposed to belting, although her performance has also been described as "bigger-than-yourself". Spanning exactly one octave from C_{4} to C_{5}, the song's limited vocal range allows Benson to effortlessly transition from her speaking to her singing voice, raising and lowering her volume throughout in a manner that resembles normal speech. In addition to singing using "a light, speech-driven ‘mix'", the singer also incorporates "quirky little comments and girly gestures". According to Screen Rant's Turner Minton, Benson's vocals "[add] a rawness to the song, giving a depth of eagerness to Ariel's voice that makes for a genuine performance", by delivering a vocal track that is a combination of passion, strength, sincerity, angst, emotion and innocence. Described as "wistful pleas", Bustle's Emma Lord observed that Benson sings the song using a combination of "tomboyish-ness and yearning". Meanwhile, the final line of the song's reprise is sung with "a bit more oomph" than the original, declaring "I don't know when, I don't know how/But I know something's starting right now". Musical similarities have been drawn between "Part of Your World" and "Somewhere That's Green" from Ashman and Menken's musical Little Shop of Horrors, specifically the manner in which the lines "part of your world" and "somewhere that's green" are sung. The song has also been compared to Judy Garland's song "Over the Rainbow" due to their shared themes about "wish[ing] for something new and different." Kyle Turner, a writer for Vice, observed that both "Part of Your World" and "Over the Rainbow" are gay anthems "that plead for a place where 'the dreams that you dream of [...] really do come true.' Meanwhile, Variety observed similarities between the ballad and some selections from the stage musical Les Misérables (1980).

The Broadway version features the song performed by Sierra Boggess as Ariel. This version was performed in the key of G Major, a full step up from the original. Boggess' vocals span D_{4} to D_{5}. The 2023 live-action film features the song performed by Halle Bailey as Ariel. Unlike the Broadway version, this version was performed in the key of F# Major. Unlike the original, Bailey makes use of belting, vocal riffs, and opt-ups. Bailey's vocals span Db_{4} to D_{5}.

=== Lyrical analysis ===
Despite its title, the word "your" is not heard in the song until its reprise. The track's introduction is preceded by a spoken monologue. According to Lindsey Romain of Marie Claire, Ariel begins the ballad by "acknowledging her privilege as a princess ('Wouldn't you think I'm the girl who has everything?')" before admitting to wanting more. Similarly, KQED contributor Emmanuel Hapsis wrote that the character "laments that, despite a life of privilege and spoils, there's still a deep loneliness inside her". Beginning "Look at this stuff, isn't it neat? Wouldn't you think my collection's complete? Wouldn't you think I'm the girl/The girl who has everything?", "Part of Your World" is "a plea for a life of discovery" and "inquisitiveness" as opposed to love, using "nonsensical expressions" such as "gadgets", "gizmos", "whosits" and "whatsits" in lieu of various human artifacts.

Lyrically, the ballad employs several "twist[s] and turns", using very specific lyrics to describe both the performer's fascination with the human world and desire to walk among them, including "walking around on those what-do-you-call-them?... feet" and "Up where they walk, up where they run/Up where they stay all day in the sun/Wanderin' free, wish I could be/Part of that world." Comprising "impeccable rhymes" while incorporating the term "thingamabobs" into the line "You want thing-a-ma-bobs? I've got twenty but who cares? No big deal, I want more", "Part of Your World"'s "empowering" lyrics convey several messages, such as facing one's fears, believing in oneself, and wishing for new life experiences. The ballad concludes with a final chorus belted "When's it my turn? Wouldn't I love, love to explore that world up above? Out of the sea/Wish I could be/Part of that world".

Bustle's Tracy Dye wrote that, in addition to "7 Lessons About Life & Facing Fear", the song also reinforces the importance of pursuing other opportunities, the belief that "material items don't lead to fulfillment", building new relationships and friendships, exploring new environments, and the concept of girl power. BuzzFeed's Aylin Zafar described "Part of Your World" as "an anthem for anyone who has ever felt they were on the outside, looking into a place ... that they yearned to be a part of." The Daily Dot's Aja Romano believes that the ballad mirrors "every young girl's wish to get away from her over-protective parents and explore the world", a sentiment shared by Rebecca Rose of Cosmopolitan who dubbed it "every young girl's lament about wanting to be part of something she idolizes." Donna Dickens of HitFix concurred that the song's lyrics are about "yearning to break free from suffocating parental expectations". Writing for Billboard, Taylor Weatherby identified "Part of Your World" as a song about "fantasizing over living a life you can't," to which he believes many people are able to relate. Derrick Gill of KXKX believes that the song is also based around the traditional saying "Is the grass greener on the other side?"

Featuring "multi-layered" lyrics, "Part of Your World" has been the subject of various interpretations; common inferences range from an adventurous teenager seeking independence from overprotective parenting, to "deeper meaning[s] relating to gender" and longing to be part of "a different kind of society". The overall sentiment remains empowering. The line "Bet you on land, they understand/Bet they don't reprimand their daughters/Bright young women sick of swimming, ready to stand" has been widely interpreted as a feminist statement. Hapsis described the verse as "super feminist". Jenny Shelton, writing for Standard Issue Magazine, identified "Part of Your World" as "a protest song" that is both proactive and pro-feminist. Thought Catalog's Zaron Burnett III described the lyrics as "feminist-sounding". One critic believes that since "Part of Your World" was released in 1989 during "an uncertain time for women" amidst backlash resulting from the women's movement, the song "could represent the disillusionment of women in this decade – sick of being told to settle with their lot and placate their dreams of true liberation with capitalist consumerism; in the same way that Ariel has been forced to satiate her true desires with meaningless trophies by her father's patriarchal subjugation." A number of critics have also identified the song's lyrics as an allegory for the LGBT community seeking public acceptance and a place in which they feel as though they belong. BuzzFeed's Chris Hernandez wrote that closeted gay people can "relate to Ariel's longing to be a part of a world that is immensely different than the one she's living in" and "that there is freedom in that world". Writing for KQED, Tony Bravo agreed that "Part of Your World" discusses "The longing that all gay kids feel to belong". Citing that Ashman himself was openly gay, Tinker Belles and Evil Queens: The Walt Disney Company from the Inside Out author Sean P. Griffin wrote that the lyricist uses the song to demonstrate "a gay dilemma of trying to choose between different worlds" by discussing "fantasy, escape and forbidden romance".

== International versions ==
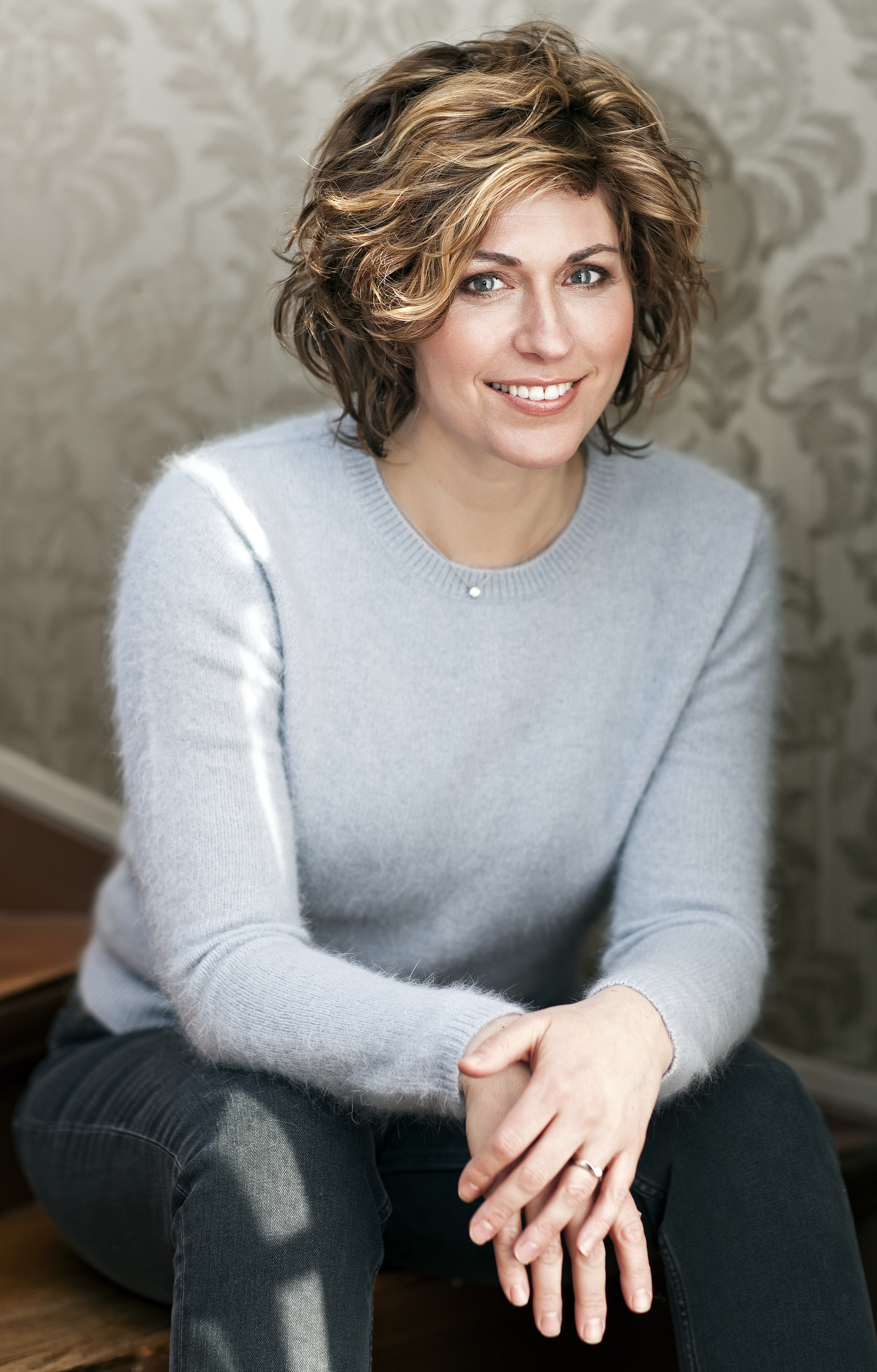
Norwegian singer Sissel Kyrkjebø sang "Part of Your World" in three languages: Danish, Norwegian and Swedish

When The Little Mermaid was released in 1989, a dubbing process was started which, in the space of two years, brought the movie to number 21 dubbings by 1991. In 1998, all existing dubbings underwent a big review process which caused 8 of them to be partially or fully redubbed and a second wave of 8 new versions to be released, for a total of 29 dubbings worldwide. In the following years, 11 more versions were added, raising the number of official versions to 40.

Norwegian singer Sissel Kyrkjebø was chosen to dub Ariel in three Nordic languages: she voiced all Ariel's parts in Norwegian and Swedish, while she only sang for the Danish version and redubbed the songs in 1998. The Austrian German version of the movie is not a full dubbing: only some characters were dubbed, while the rest of the dubbing, including the adaptation of the lyrics, was taken from the German version released in 1998.

Simona Patitucci, who dubbed Ariel in Italian as part of the versions released between 1989 and 1991, was awarded by Disney best European Ariel, while Svetlana Svetikova, who voiced Ariel in Russian only in 2006, was awarded best Ariel worldwide. Danielle Marsh of NewJeans dubbed Ariel in Korean as part of Disney's 2023 localization.

== Reception ==
"Part of Your World" has garnered widespread acclaim from both film and music critics, who continue to praise the song constantly. It has been praised for both its empowering lyrics and Benson's vocal performance. Calling it a "musical bull's-eye", The New York Times film critic Janet Maslin wrote that "Any Broadway musical would be lucky to include a single number" as good as "Part of Your World". Scott Holleran of Box Office Mojo reviewed the song as a "triumphant tune", writing that listening to Benson "belt it out takes one's breath away." Holleran continued to write that the song "captures the buoyant idealism that drives this mythical tale and sets it sailing". Sputnikmusic opined that Benson sings the song both brilliantly and convincingly. Filmtracks.com described "Part of Your World" as a "gorgeous ballad" while describing Benson's performance as "tender enough to be believable ... while also accurately resonating at the necessary high ranges." The New York Daily News' Kathleen Carroll called Benson's voice "exceptionally lovely", while Variety wrote that the singer "exhibits a show-stopping set of pipes" during "Part of Your World". Writing for The Morton Report, Chaz Lipp agreed that Benson's performance is "positively charming". Darryn King of The Sydney Morning Herald described it as the film's centerpiece and "a Menken masterclass in underlining an emotional journey in music".

Upon release of The Little Mermaid in 1989, Disney was unprepared for the success that would be achieved by both the film's soundtrack and its songs, particularly that of "Part of Your World", which became an instant hit. The studio had not thought to prepare a single version of the song at the time because they did not expect that it would soon be demanded by local radio stations, at which it was heavily rotated. The success of "Part of Your World" has been overshadowed by "Under the Sea" and "Kiss the Girl", two other popular songs from the film. While both "Under the Sea" and "Kiss the Girl" were nominated for an Academy Award for Best Original Song at the 62nd Academy Awards, which "Under the Sea" ultimately won, "Part of Your World" did not receive a nomination, which some critics have viewed as a snub. Benson believes that the Academy of Motion Picture Arts and Sciences did not recognize "Part of Your World" because "a story song at the time was probably not recognised really as much". Aja Romano of The Daily Dot argued that Ashman and Menken should have won for "Part of Your World" over "Under the Sea". Similarly, GoldDerby's Andrew Carden wrote that "Part of Your World" was "more deserving" of "Kiss the Girl"'s nomination. However, when the film was released to VHS in 1998, Disney included a music video for "Part of Your World" starring Benson that appears towards the end of its closing credits. When The Little Mermaid was re-released to theaters in 1997, The Boston Phoenix's Jeffrey Gantz wrote that "Part of Your World" remains "as poignant as ever". Tracy Dye of Bustle identified "Part of Your World" as her "favorite Disney song of all time." Entertainment Weekly's Esther Zuckerman described "Part of Your World" as "a perfect 'I Want' song," comparing it positively to "Wouldn't It Be Loverly" from the stage musical My Fair Lady (1956). The Mary Sue's Jessica Mason declared it "hands down, the best 'I want' song in the Disney canon", describing it as "a seminal number that speaks to a near universal desire to escape our loneliness and adolescence into something bigger and better".

In 2013, Disney released a digitally remastered Diamond Edition of The Little Mermaid on Blu-ray/DVD. Some fans of the film noticed that an error had occurred during the remastering process that resulted in two brief segments from the "Part of Your World" sequence to play in reversed order, appearing in the opposite order of the way in which they appeared in the original film. Specifically, Flounder is shown sighing while Ariel is singing one line, whose lips are later shown to be out of sync with the words she is singing in the following scene for a few seconds. The edit upset some purist fans who demanded that Disney recall the DVDs. While acknowledging that a "minor oversight" did occur during the editing process that resulted in the switching of two scenes during "Part of Your World", Disney originally assured customers that "There is no impact on the quality or overall experience of the film". However, the studio eventually allowed owners of the defective discs to contact them to receive a free replacement with the error corrected.

"Part of Your World"

Single by Halle Bailey

from the album The Little Mermaid: Original Motion Picture Soundtrack
- Released: April 26, 2023
- Recorded: 2022
- Genre: Musical theatre, pop ballad
- Length: 3:33
- Label: Walt Disney
- Composer: Alan Menken
- Lyricist: Howard Ashman
- Producer: Alan Menken

== Halle Bailey version ==
In the 2023 live-action adaptation of The Little Mermaid, Halle Bailey performs "Part of Your World" as Ariel. The song was issued as a digital single on April 26, 2023, ahead of the full soundtrack's release.

Bailey's rendition modulates the original key, with the new arrangement set in G major rather than the F major of Jodi Benson's 1989 version. Unlike the original, Bailey incorporates belting, vocal riffs, and opt-ups into her performance, with her vocal range on the track spanning D_{4} to E♭_{5}.

Bailey also performed "Part of Your World" live at Disneyland during American Idol's "Disney Night" episode on May 14, 2023.

== Live performances and stage versions ==
Benson continues to perform "Part of Your World" live in concert around the world. Benson sang "Part of Your World" at the Walt Disney World Very Merry Christmas Parade in 1995. In 2011, Benson performed the song live at the grand opening ceremony of the Disneyland Resort attraction The Little Mermaid: Ariel's Undersea Adventure in California. At the 2011 D23 Expo, the actress sang "Part of Your World" live during the Disney Legends ceremony, where she also accepted a Disney Legends Award for her continued contributions to the Walt Disney Company.

"Part of Your World" was featured in the stage musical adaptation of The Little Mermaid, which ran on Broadway at the Lunt-Fontanne Theatre from 2008 to 2009. Actress Sierra Boggess originated the role of Ariel in her Broadway debut, becoming the first actress to perform "Part of Your World" in the production. To promote the musical, Boggess performed "Part of Your World" live on The Today Show, which marked her first live television appearance. Reviewing a performance of the musical during its pre-Broadway tryout run in Denver, Colorado, John Moore of The Denver Post observed that audiences enjoyed "Part of Your World" the most out of the show's songs. Variety's David Rooney opined that the ballad "fares better" than the production's other musical numbers "despite Boggess being stuck in a plastic cave for most of it." Boggess also recorded "Part of Your World" for the musical's original Broadway cast album. Furthermore, the actress included a live rendition of the song on her debut studio album Awakening: Live at 54 Below (2013), which was first performed and recorded live at the restaurant 54 Below in Manhattan, New York. Reviewing Boggess' 2017 concert at the State Theatre in Sydney, Australia, Ben Neutze of the Daily Review described Boggess' performance of "Part of Your World" as "physically cartoon-esque, but deeply felt". In the Broadway musical, Boggess was eventually replaced by actress Chelsea Morgan Stock, who performed "Part of Your World" for the remainder of the show's run, describing the song as her "favorite moment". Stock reprised her role as Ariel and performed "Part of Your World" in Dallas Summer Musicals' stage adaptation of The Little Mermaid at the Music Hall at Fair Park in 2014. As part of the production's reimagining, Stock sang "Part of Your World" while attached to a harness and hoisted several feet above the stage in mid-air to simulate the act of swimming.

In June 2016, singer-songwriter Sara Bareilles performed "Part of Your World" live while starring as Ariel in a concert adaptation of The Little Mermaid at the Hollywood Bowl. At the end of both evenings' performances, Benson herself made a surprise guest appearance to reprise "Part of Your World", which the audience greeted with rapturous applause. Introduced to the stage by Bareilles, the two singers hugged before Benson began her performance, wearing a sparkling blue mermaid-cut gown inspired by Ariel. Benson's performance was rewarded with a standing ovation from the audience, moving her to tears. Variety's Jenelle Riley described Benson's rendition as "captivating", while Ethan Anderton of Slash Film was impressed that the actress "still has some incredible pipes" despite being 54 years old at the time. Emily Rome, writing for Uproxx, observed that the singer alternated between "Ariel"s teen voice" and "her own beautiful soprano". For the concert's third and final performance, Benson replaced Bareilles entirely to reprise her role as Ariel and perform "Part of Your World" once again, while Bareilles was attending the Tony Awards in New York. "Part of Your World" was the first cover actor and singer Darren Criss, who appeared in the show opposite Bareilles and Benson as Prince Eric, uploaded to YouTube in 2007 prior to landing his breakout role on the musical television series Glee.

== Cover versions and use in media ==
"Part of Your World" continues to be covered extensively by various recording artists and musicians, leading some critics to name it one of the most covered Disney songs in recent memory. According to the music database SecondHandSongs, "Part of Your World" is the 10th most covered song released in 1989, with over 45 recognized versions. Although Benson has never been overprotective of the song, she admitted "some of the covers were not necessarily what I think Howard would have liked", particularly "dance versions" of the ballad. In 1996, singer Faith Hill recorded a cover of "Part of Your World" for the country music compilation album The Best of Country Sing the Best of Disney. Chely Wright contributed a rendition to the film's sequel, The Little Mermaid II: Return to the Sea (2000). Wright also performed "Part of Your World" live at the sequel's Hollywood premiere. Jessica Simpson covered the ballad for the compilation album Disneymania in 2002, one of three The Little Mermaid songs on the album. "Part of Your World" is used as a minigame in the video game Kingdom Hearts II (2005), in which players help Sebastian prepare for a musical showcase. Players are required to achieve five "Excellent" combos while playing "Part of Your World" before advancing to the next level. In 2005, Skye Sweetnam recorded a pop punk rendition of the song for the compilation album Disneymania 3 which is accompanied with a music video. Miley Cyrus recorded a pop rock version of the song for the compilation album Disneymania 5 (2007), which MTV retrospectively ranked the seventh best track on the album in 2015, criticizing its fast tempo but crowning Cyrus "the Princess Ariel of the OG Disney Channel squad." In 2007, actor Darren Criss uploaded a video of himself performing "Part of Your World" to YouTube. Actress Anna Maria Perez de Tagle recorded a "high energized dance remix" of the song for the compilation album Disneymania 7 (2010), interpreting how Ariel "would sound today". Jack Johnson of E! described Perez de Tagle's cover as "fit for a princess". In 2012, Bruno Mars performed "Part of Your World" at BBC's Live Lounge. Mars introduced the ballad as "the best song ever written", claiming that he has always struggled to sing it without crying. Lyrically, Mars changed Ariel's amount of thingamabobs owned from 20 to 30. Video footage of Mars' performance became very popular on the Internet, which Sally Mercedes of Latina opined "made us love him even more". German opera singer Diana Damrau covered "Part of Your World" in her native language ("Ein Mensch zu sein") for her album Forever (2013). Writing for Opera News, Judith Malafronte dismissed Damrau's rendition as one of the album's "near-misses", accusing her of sounding too "syrupy" and "brassy" on the track. However, Gramophone's Adrian Edwards enjoyed Jason Carr's arrangement.

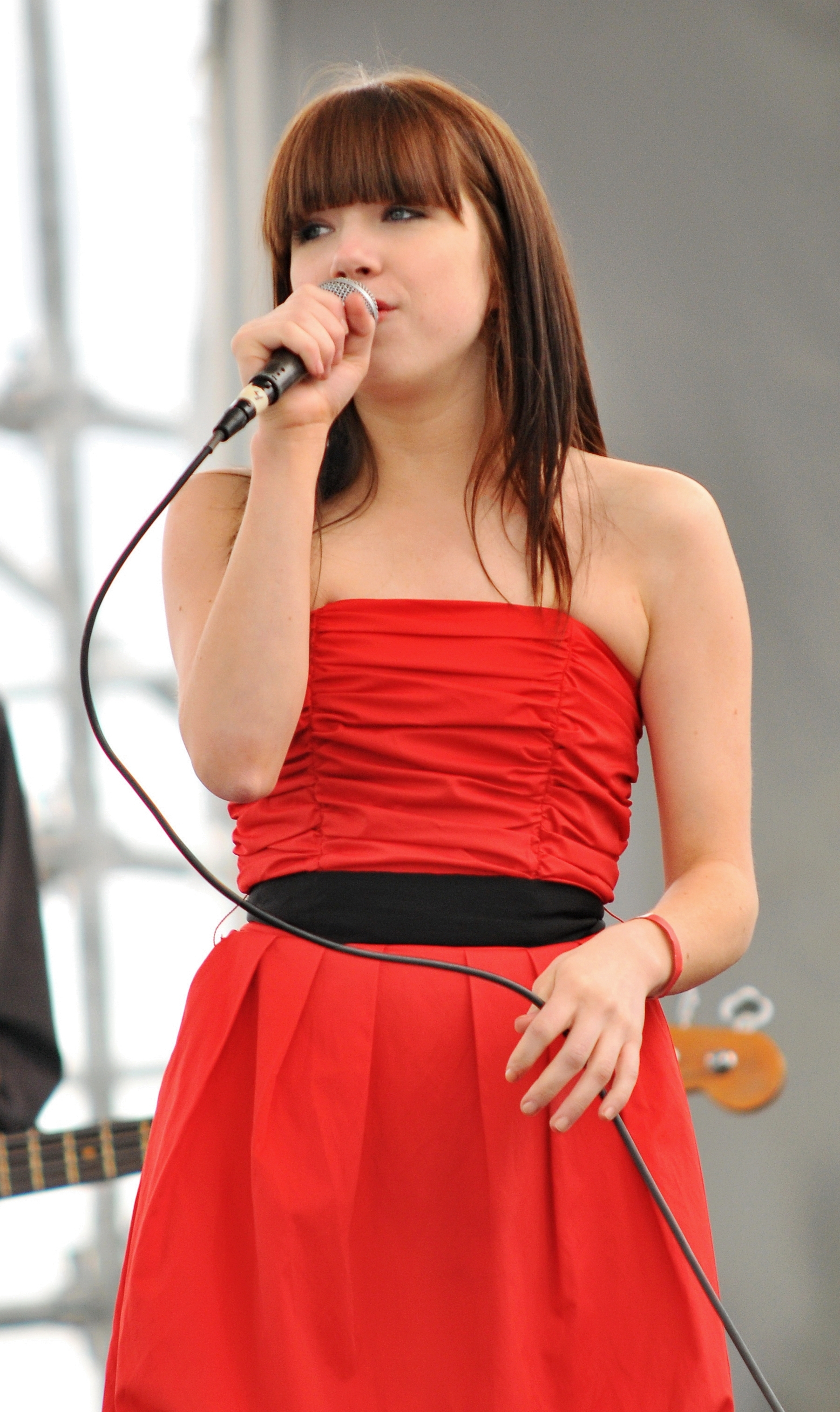
Canadian singer-songwriter Carly Rae Jepsen covered "Part of Your World" for The Little Mermaid's Diamond Edition re-release.

In 2013, Carly Rae Jepsen covered "Part of Your World" for The Little Mermaid's Diamond Edition re-release, accompanied by a music video. Buyers of the DVD were issued a download code to obtain the cover free, which was also included on the album The Little Mermaid Greatest Hits (2013). The singer credits "Part of the World" with reintroducing her to her musical theatre background, which she incorporated into her cover. Studying Benson's version for inspiration, Jepsen was initially intimidated by the idea of covering "Part of Your World" before deciding to simply "have fun" and "do it in my own way". Jepsen borrows Ariel's monologue from the original version for her own introduction. The singer portrays a "real life" version of Ariel in the music video, for which she volunteered to dye her hair red. Jepsen also wears a mechanically operated mermaid tail in the video, which she found difficult to both put on and remove. Jepsen's cover has been met with mixed reviews from music critics. Praising both the singer's interpretation and music video, Benson preferred Jepson's rendition over some previous covers because she felt that it focused "on telling the story", which she believes Ashman also would have appreciated. Jezebel contributor Kate Dries hailed the cover as a "perfect alignment of recording artist and song". Canada.com's Jon Dekel described Jepsen's cover as "fittingly saccharine". Mike Wass of Idolator wrote, "it's nice to hear [Jepsen] try something different" despite believing that her voice is better suited for up-tempo songs. Heather Phares of AllMusic reviewed Jepsen's interpretation as less "inspired" than Benson's, while The Morton Report's Chaz Lipp dismissed the cover as "bland". Japanese Frozen voice actress Sayaka Kanda also sang the song in English.

British singer-songwriter Jessie J recorded a cover of "Part of Your World" for the compilation album We Love Disney (2015). Jessie J decided to record it because she had enjoyed it as a child. She said that she would sometimes envision herself singing the song while combing her hair using a fork. The cover's arrangement is similar to that of the original, combined with the singer's "uniquely feminine self-awareness". Jessie J's performance has been met with very positive reviews. AllMusic critic Neil Z. Yeung deemed it "a stunner". Entertainment Weekly's Madison Vain commended Jessie J's "power and control [for] highlighting the best nuances of Ariel's famous tune." While admitting her preference for Benson's original, Rebecca Rose of Cosmopolitan agreed that Jessie J's version is "stunning" and "extremely enchanting", demonstrating the singer's "perfect" vocals. E! ranked the cover the album's best track, joking, "It's how we all wish we sounded when we sing it in the shower." In 2016, singer-songwriter Sara Bareilles performed an impromptu rendition of "Part of Your World" live at the Brooks Atkinson Theatre to entertain audiences while waiting for a production of her Broadway musical Waitress (2015), to recover from a technical malfunction involving a set piece. The performance was humorous and interactive, with Bareilles encouraging the initially confused audience members to sing along with her. Bareilles would eventually perform the same song in a concert adaptation of The Little Mermaid at the Hollywood Bowl, in which played Ariel. To commemorate the film's 25th anniversary in 2014, Billboard published a list of the website's "Favorite 'Part Of Your World' Covers".

In 2021, Apple used "Part of Your World" to advertise their iPad Pro tablet. In 2024, New Found Glory covered "Part of Your World" for A Whole New Sound, a compilation album featuring pop-punk covers of songs from classic Disney films.

== Legacy ==
Considered a "classic" Disney song, "Part of Your World" has since established itself as both The Little Mermaid's hallmark song and signature ballad. Believed to be responsible for introducing "Disney's Broadway age", the song is also credited with making the "I Want" song a popular staple of future animated Disney musical films, at the same time introducing film audiences to a period known as the Disney Renaissance. Darryn King of The Sydney Morning Herald believes the song "signified...the triumphant return of the American musical tradition", after the American musical had fallen out of favor. Latina contributor Sally Mercedes dubbed the song "one of the most memorable Disney songs ever". "Part of Your World" is also considered Benson's signature song, which she has yet to grow tired of singing. Benson believes that the popularity of the song is one of the main reasons The Little Mermaid was instrumental in helping revive the animated film genre during the 1990s. HitFix contributor Donna Dickens credits much of the film's success with Benson's performance of the song. Time selected "Part of Your World" as one of the Disney Renaissance's most iconic moments, writing, "If you are a female-identified child of the ‘90s, chances are good that you have belted this song into your hairbrush or showerhead on more than one occasion." Billboard's Erin Strecker agreed that "every single child has sung ['Part of Your World'] into a hairbrush". Yahoo! Movies contributor Gwynne Watkins crowned the song "one of Disney's all-time greatest character songs". Amy Valm of Today's Parent believes that "Part of Your World" resonated particularly strongly among millennial audiences, crediting it with introducing many of them to the word "reprimand". Music streaming service Deezer revealed that "Part of Your World" was the 19th most streamed Disney song of 2017. It is also one of the "most enduring" songs in the Disney canon, and remains one of the studio's most popular songs to-date. Writers for Vulture named "Part of Your World" one of the 100 most influential sequences in animation history, calling it "not only the start of Disney's resurrection, but gave them an emotion to inhabit for the next 30 years".

Den of Geek placed both "Part of Your World" and its reprise at number one on the website's ranking of "The Top 25 Best Disney Songs from the Renaissance Era", with author David Crow referring to it as the song that "defined the Disney formula to come", identifying it as "the heart and soul of The Little Mermaid, and defined the Disney formula to come." Crow concluded that the reprise "brings out better than any 'I Want' song that came afterward the sense of pained and potent adolescent longing, with a bittersweetness worthy of Eliza Doolittle." Mic also ranked the song first, with author Jordan Appugliesi calling it "everything Disney fans want and need." M Magazine concurred, highlighting "You want thing-a-ma-bobs? I've got twenty but who cares? No big deal, I want more" as the magazine's favorite lyric. Variety agreed that "Part of Your World" is the second "Best Disney Song of All Time", crowning it Ashman and Menken's "most flawlessly constructed [Disney] composition". Billboard considers "Part of Your World" to be the Disney Renaissance's eighth best song, with contributor Taylor Weatherby crediting it with inspiring an entire generation to use the term "thingamabob". Ranking the ballad the eighth greatest Disney song, IGN's Lucy O'brien wrote that "Part of Your World" "has since become a shower-staple for girls the world over, with particular emphasis given to 'bet they don't...REPRIMAND their daughters,' universally." Awarding the song the same placement, HitFix's Donna Dickens wrote that the ballad "spoke to everyone from six to ninety-six" with Ariel becoming "the stand-in for every child who ever felt like an outsider, every teen navigating the waters of becoming an adult, every parent struggling to remember the urgency of adolescence" and "every human who ever burned to do more than exist in a mundane town". ET Canada placed the song at number 11 on their ranking of "The Top 12 Disney Songs Of All Time", joking, "Singing to a fork has never been so memorable".

"Part of Your World" is also considered one of Disney's best "I Want" songs, credited with initiating a trend of Disney heroines singing about wanting more out of their lives. On MTV's ranking of "Disney's 'I Want' Songs from Worst to Best", "Part of Your World" was placed first. Space.ca agreed with MTV's ranking, at the same time crediting it with the success of "Let It Go", a popular "I Want" song from Disney's Frozen (2013). Boing Boing also ranked "Part of Your World" first on the website's countdown of "All of Disney's 'I Want' songs", with author Caroline Siede lauding it as "potentially one of the best ['I Want' songs] in musical theater as a whole." The Daily Dot ranked "Part of Your World" the third greatest Disney "I Want" song, believing it deserved to win the Academy Award over "Under the Sea". Author Aja Romano credits the song with making princess characters "relevant again" by introducing "a girl with something to fight for instead of vague wishes about princes". Additionally, "Part of Your World" has had a profound influence on subsequent Disney ballads and "I Want" songs. Filmtracks.com credits the song with "Setting the table for songs like 'Belle' [from Beauty and the Beast (1991)] and several others in the years to come ... becom[ing] a concept that Menken attempted to infuse in each subsequent effort." Decider.com's Tyler Coates believes that the song directly influenced "Let it Go", writing, "While the composition of 'Let It Go' and 'Part of Your World' are very different ... the former would not exist if it were not for the latter."

"Part of Your World" is considered to be a feminist anthem by some. The song is also regarded as a gay anthem, with The Guardian's Guy Lodge dubbing it "something of an all-purpose anthem for LGBT not-belongers." Romain "an anthem for anyone whose personal identification might not align with their physical presentation". Part of Your World" is also often parodied in subsequent media. An instrumental version of the song is heard in the film Enchanted (2007) during the scene in which Giselle (Amy Adams) examines the aquarium in Robert's (Patrick Dempsey) office. Benson also appears in the film as Robert's secretary; "Part of Your World" is used to underscore some of Benson's scenes. Video footage showing Ashman coaching Benson during one of the earliest recording sessions for "Part of Your World" continues to garner attention on the internet.

== Charts ==
=== Weekly charts ===
Weekly chart performance for "Part of Your World" by Halle Bailey
Chart (2023)	Peak position
US Bubbling Under Hot 100 (Billboard)	19
New Zealand Hot Singles (Recorded Music NZ)	12
UK Singles (OCC)	58

== Certifications ==
Certifications for "Part of Your World" by Jodi Benson
Region	Certification	Certified units/sales
United Kingdom (BPI)	Platinum	600,000^{‡}
United States (RIAA)	4× Platinum	4,000,000^{‡}
^{‡} Sales+streaming figures based on certification alone.

Certifications for "Part of Your World" by Halle Bailey
Region	Certification	Certified units/sales
Brazil (Pro-Música Brasil)	Gold	20,000^{‡}
^{‡} Sales+streaming figures based on certification alone.
