= Fathoms Below =

Song by the Ship's Chorus

from the album The Little Mermaid: Original Motion Picture Soundtrack
- Released: 1989
- Genre: Soundtrack
- Length: 1:41
- Label: Walt Disney
- Composer: Alan Menken
- Lyricist: Howard Ashman
- Producers: Menken; Ashman

"Fathoms Below" is the opening song from the 1989 animated Disney feature film The Little Mermaid. A rousing sea shanty written by Alan Menken and Howard Ashman, the song is sung by the ship's crew on the film's original soundtrack. An extended version with additional lyrics by Glenn Slater appears in the 2008 stage adaptation of the musical.

The song has since appeared in a 2015 episode of Once Upon a Time, sung by a teenaged Ursula during a flashback, as well as the 2023 live-action adaptation of the film, sung by Prince Eric (Jonah Hauer-King) and the ensemble.

== Production ==
Ashman decided to structure the opening sequence as an underwater montage, and so along with Menken wrote the song "Fathoms Below". The song was severely cut in size as Jeffrey Katzenberg that thought in a film, unlike a Broadway show, audiences would be unwilling to watch a lengthy opening number. The extended sequence was meant to show that Ursula is King Triton's sister. The storyboarded and pencil animation of this can be found on YouTube.

The song is featured in the Walt Disney World attraction Electric Water Pageant.

== Synopsis ==
The "ship full of sailors first came onto the stage in the “Fathoms Below” number", and they sing about the mysteriousness of the deep blue sea, and mythical stories of the merfolk, such as "look out lad, a mermaid be waiting for you". The song it introduces the film and the legend of the merfolk from the perspective of sailors reciting to Prince Eric and foreshadows the love story between Ariel and Prince Eric.

In the 2023 live-action film, however, it is moved to after "Part of Your World" when Ariel discovers Eric's ship amidst the fireworks being launched from it and observes Eric's birthday celebration before the storm.

== Reception ==
Filmtracks wrote that "of the seven songs in "The Little Mermaid", the first two Fathoms Below and Daughters of Triton are weaker ensemble pieces that cannot compete with the lengthier production numbers that follow". In regard to the former song, the site added "The working voices of 'Fathoms Below' are strong both in their representation of the sailors and in their recording quality. Had this song been expanded for the film as it would be for the Broadway show, it could have been a hit." While describing the film's album as "flat and dull", it noted "Only the vocals in "Fathoms Below" and some of the percussion in "Jig" seem to exhibit a three-dimensional sound".

Reviewing the Broadway musical, Variety wrote "“Under the Sea” would have been a more obvious scene-setting opener than the ho-hum sea chanty “Fathoms Below,” expanded from a few throwaway bars in the film".
