= Les Poissons =

Song by René Auberjonois

from the album Disney's The Little Mermaid: Original Motion Picture Soundtrack
- Released: 1989
- Length: 1:35
- Label: Walt Disney Records
- Composer: Alan Menken
- Lyricist: Howard Ashman
- Producers: Menken; Ashman; Robert Kraft; Ted Kryczko

"Les Poissons" (in French les poissons simply means 'the fishes') is a song from the 1989 film The Little Mermaid, which is sung in the film and in The Little Mermaid Broadway show by the French character Chef Louis. Chef Louis is voiced by René Auberjonois in the film, and by John Treacy Egan in the Broadway show. The song was composed by Alan Menken with lyrics by Howard Ashman, and is followed by a chase scene featuring Jacques Offenbach's "Can-Can".

Sebastian the crab (voiced by Samuel E. Wright) is trapped in a kitchen with Chef Louis who sings the song while preparing a seafood dinner for the newly human Ariel and Prince Eric. The song is on the Classic Disney Vol. 3: 60 Years of Musical Magic CD.

Both the song and character of Chef Louis do not appear in the 2023 live-action remake of the film due to the new approach given to the story to have the second half focus more on the developing romantic relationship between Ariel and Eric. Explaining its exclusion, director Rob Marshall stated: "It's literally a Saturday morning cartoon section. If we had filmed it – I don’t know how we would've filmed it –- it never would have played. It's also a vacation from the story and has nothing to do with the story, so you can't do that in a live-action film."
