= Kiss the Girl =

Song from Disney's The Little Mermaid

Song by Samuel E. Wright

from the album Disney's The Little Mermaid: Original Motion Picture Soundtrack
- Released: 1989
- Recorded: 1988–1989
- Genre: Calypso, pop
- Length: 2:43
- Label: Walt Disney Records
- Composer: Alan Menken
- Lyricist: Howard Ashman
- Producers: Menken; Ashman; Robert Kraft

"Kiss the Girl" is a song written by lyricist Howard Ashman and composer Alan Menken for Walt Disney Pictures' animated film The Little Mermaid (1989). Originally recorded by American actor Samuel Wright in his film role as Sebastian, "Kiss the Girl" is a romantic calypso love song; the song's lyrics encourages Prince Eric to kiss Ariel before it's too late.

"Kiss the Girl" had a mostly positive reception. The song was nominated for both an Academy and Golden Globe Award for Best Original Song, but lost both to "Under the Sea", another song from The Little Mermaid soundtrack.

== Background and composition ==
The song takes place during Ariel's second day as human. Ariel and Eric are in a boat and Sebastian tries to set a romantic mood in order to inspire Eric to kiss Ariel.

== Lyrics ==
The lyrics of the song are written in 6 stanzas of 7 verses each, each stanza closing with the refrain sung as a slight variation of expressing the expectation of what happens when "You kiss the girl". The variations of the single verse refrain start with "You wanna kiss the girl", going through slight variations in each stanza, which also include one stanza stating "Aint gonna kiss the girl", until the closing stanza which sings the refrain as "You gotta kiss the girl". The song closes with an outro which repeats each version of the refrain one after the other. The song's lyrics express the expectations of a boyfriend about to bestow a first kiss to his romantic interest. For the 2023 live-action film, some of the lyrics were updated in response to viewers who have gotten "sensitive about the idea that (Prince Eric) would, in any way, force himself on (Ariel)."

== Certifications ==
Region	Certification	Certified units/sales
United Kingdom (BPI)	Silver	200,000^{‡}
United States (RIAA)	2× Platinum	2,000,000^{‡}
^{‡} Sales+streaming figures based on certification alone.

== Peter André version ==
"Kiss the Girl"

Single by Peter Andre
- Released: July 13, 1998
- Recorded: 1997
- Genre: Pop, calypso
- Length: 2:52
- Label: Mushroom Records
- Composer: Alan Menken
- Lyricist: Howard Ashman
- Producer: Peter Andre

Peter Andre singles chronology
"All Night, All Right" (1998)	"Kiss the Girl" (1998)	"Mysterious Girl (2004)" (2004)

Licensed audio
- "Kiss the Girl" on YouTube
- "Kiss the Girl" on YouTube

When The Little Mermaid was re-released in cinemas, Peter André recorded a version of the song, which reached #9 on the UK Singles Chart.

=== Music video ===
The video shows Andre performing the song in a recording studio. Scenes from the film are intercut with the video or shown on a backdrop behind Andre and the backing singers. There are slight references to water and the undersea world in the video. As Andre performs a beautiful girl comes in carrying water. Andre sees her and is immediately taken with her. He helps her clean up the water as she spills it and follows her into the next room where they gaze at each other through a fishtank. Andre tries to kiss the girl but she backs away. He follows her again as she goes outside and they kiss.

=== Track listing ===
CD1

1. "Kiss The Girl" - 2:52
2. "Mysterious Girl (1998)" (feat. Shaggy) - 4:14
3. "Just For You" - 5:02

CD2

1. "Kiss The Girl" - 2:52
2. "Kiss The Girl" (Original Disney Version) - 2:49
3. "Best Of Me" - 4:03

Cassette / 7" vinyl

1. "Kiss The Girl" - 2:52
2. "Mysterious Girl (1998)" (feat. Shaggy) - 4:14

== Ashley Tisdale version ==
"Kiss the Girl"

Promotional single by Ashley Tisdale

from the album Disney's The Little Mermaid: An Original Walt Disney Records Soundtrack (Special Edition) and Disneymania 5
- Released: September 4, 2006 (Radio Disney)
- Recorded: 2006
- Genre: Pop rock
- Length: 3:23
- Label: Warner Bros. Records
- Composer: Alan Menken
- Lyricist: Howard Ashman

Licensed audio
- "Kiss the Girl" on YouTube
- "Kiss the Girl" on YouTube

In 2006, when The Little Mermaid was re-released on DVD as a 2-Disc Platinum Edition, another rendition of the song was recorded by Ashley Tisdale. It was included on the Special Edition re-release of the film's soundtrack. It was later included on DisneyMania 5.

=== Music video ===
The music video, released on September 6, 2006, consists of a girl at a school dance. As she hangs out with her friends, she notices a boy repeatedly glancing at her. The boy's friend encourages him to talk to Tisdale, but every time he gets close, she goes somewhere else. The video ends with Tisdale asking him to dance, and then at the end she kisses him on the cheek. Tooth Tunes included the song in one of their products. The music video is included as a bonus feature on the 2006 Platinum Edition release of the film.

=== Charts ===
In the first week of April 2007, Tisdale's version of "Kiss the Girl" debuted on the Billboard's Bubbling Under Hot 100 Singles at #16. One week later, the song debuted on the Billboard Hot 100 at #81.

Chart (2007)	Peak position
U.S. Billboard Hot 100	81
U.S. Billboard Pop 100	74
U.S. Billboard Hot Digital Songs	68
UK Singles Chart	86

== Other notable versions ==
In 1991, Soul II Soul released a version for the compilation Simply Mad About the Mouse: A Musical Celebration of Imagination. Their version also appeared in part one of the Family Matters episode "We're Going to Disney World" during the montage with Stefan Urquelle (played by Jaleel White) and Laura Winslow (played by Kellie Shanygne Williams) in Disney World.

Country music band Little Texas recorded a version on the 1996 album The Best of Country Sing the Best of Disney. This rendition peaked at number 52 on the Hot Country Songs charts. The song was performed on the talent show American Idol season 16 by Cade Foehner in 2018.
