= Under the Sea =

1989 song

Single by Samuel E. Wright

from the album The Little Mermaid: Original Motion Picture Soundtrack
- Released: December 13, 1989
- Recorded: 1988
- Genre: Pop; calypso; show tune; reggae
- Length: 3:16
- Label: Walt Disney
- Composer: Alan Menken
- Lyricist: Howard Ashman
- Producers: Menken; Ashman

Audio video
- "Under the Sea" on YouTube

"Under the Sea" is a song from Disney's 1989 animated film The Little Mermaid, composed by Alan Menken with lyrics by Howard Ashman. It is influenced by the calypso style of the Caribbean as well as reggae. The song was performed in the film by Samuel E. Wright. The track won the Academy Award for Best Original Song in 1989, the first for a Disney film since "Chim Chim Cher-ee" from Mary Poppins in 1964. Additionally, the song won the Grammy Award for Best Song Written for Visual Media in 1991.

The song is a plea by the crab Sebastian convincing Ariel to remain sea-bound and resist her desire to become a human in order to spend her life with Prince Eric, with whom she has fallen in love. Sebastian warns of the struggles of human life, while at the same time expounding the benefits of a care-free life underwater. Unfortunately, his plea falls on deaf ears as Ariel leaves before the end of the song.

The song is present throughout all the Walt Disney parks and resorts and the Disney Cruise Line.

The song was later performed by Daveed Diggs in the 2023 remake.

== Single release ==
The song was released as a 12" single in 1990 by Hollywood Records. The record listed the artist as "Sebastian C." for "Sebastian Crab".

US 12-inch single (ST-ED-66621A-SP)

1. "Under the Sea" (Atlantic Ocean Single Mix) - 3:36
2. "Under the Sea" (Jellyfish Mix) - 5:20
3. "Under the Sea" (Mermaid Dub) - 3:27
4. "Under the Sea" (Pacific Ocean Single Mix) - 3:10
5. "Under the Sea" (Polka Dot Bikini Mix) - 5:33
6. "Under the Sea" (Sub Dub) - 3:46

== Certifications ==
Region	Certification	Certified units/sales
New Zealand (RMNZ)	Platinum	30,000^{‡}
United Kingdom (BPI)	Platinum	600,000^{‡}
United States (RIAA)	3× Platinum	3,000,000^{‡}
^{‡} Sales+streaming figures based on certification alone.

== Live and stage versions ==
"Under the Sea"

Song by Tituss Burgess

from the album Disney's The Little Mermaid: Original Broadway Cast Recording
- Released: February 26, 2008
- Genre: Pop; calypso; show tune; reggae
- Length: 4:06
- Label: Walt Disney
- Composer: Alan Menken
- Lyricist: Howard Ashman
- Producer: Alan Menken

The song makes an appearance on the Disney Cruise Line shows "Disney Dreams: An Enchanted Classic" on the Disney Magic and Wonder, as well as in "The Golden Mickeys" on the Disney Dream. The song was also performed by the Resonanz Children's Choir during the When You Wish Upon a Star concert in 2019, accompanied by the Jakarta Concert Orchestra conducted by Avip Priatna.

In 2007, the Broadway musical version used this as the featured production number, with the role of Sebastian played by Tituss Burgess. For Burgess, a tenor (unlike the baritone Wright), the key of the song was raised from B-flat to D. On the Original Broadway Cast Recording, the placing of the song was also moved to after the scene in which King Triton destroys Ariel's collection of "human stuff". Later in some local productions after the Broadway production closed, the placing of the song is the same as it was in the original film. The key was lowered slightly to the key of C (in which Ashman and Menken recorded their initial demos for The Little Mermaid). A reprise of the song was also featured in the Broadway musical.
