= The Little Mermaid (2023 film) =

American musical fantasy film

- Theatrical release poster
- Directed by: Rob Marshall
- Screenplay by: David Magee
- Based on: "The Little Mermaid" by Hans Christian Andersen; Disney's The Little Mermaid by; John Musker; Ron Clements
- Produced by: Marc Platt; Lin-Manuel Miranda; John DeLuca; Rob Marshall
- Starring: Halle Bailey; Jonah Hauer-King; Daveed Diggs; Awkwafina; Jacob Tremblay; Noma Dumezweni; Art Malik; Javier Bardem; Melissa McCarthy
- Cinematography: Dion Beebe
- Edited by: Wyatt Smith
- Music by: Alan Menken
- Production companies: Walt Disney Pictures; DeLuca Marshall; Marc Platt Productions
- Distributed by: Walt Disney Studios Motion Pictures
- Release dates: May 8, 2023 (Dolby Theatre); May 26, 2023 (United States)
- Running time: 135 minutes
- Country: United States
- Language: English
- Budget: $240.2 million
- Box office: $569.6 million

The Little Mermaid is a 2023 American musical fantasy film and a live-action adaptation of Disney's 1989 animated film, itself loosely based on the 1837 fairy tale by Hans Christian Andersen. Directed by Rob Marshall and written by David Magee, the film stars Halle Bailey as the title character, with Jonah Hauer-King, Daveed Diggs, Awkwafina, Jacob Tremblay, Noma Dumezweni, Art Malik, Javier Bardem, and Melissa McCarthy in supporting roles. The story follows the mermaid princess Ariel, who is fascinated with the human world; after saving Prince Eric from a shipwreck, she makes a deal with the sea witch Ursula to walk on land.

Plans for a Little Mermaid remake were confirmed in May 2016. In December 2017, Disney announced Marshall was being courted to direct the film. Bailey, Hauer-King, McCarthy, Bardem, Diggs, Tremblay, Awkwafina, and the rest of the cast joined between July and November 2019. Principal photography was slated to begin in London in early 2020, but was delayed by the COVID-19 pandemic. Filming ultimately took place from January to July 2021, primarily at Pinewood Studios in England and on the island of Sardinia. Composer Alan Menken returned to augment the score and write new songs alongside Lin-Manuel Miranda, who serves as a producer with Marc Platt, John DeLuca, and Marshall. The film is dedicated to the late Howard Ashman, who co-produced and co-wrote the songs from the original film.

The Little Mermaid premiered at the Dolby Theatre in Los Angeles on May 8, 2023, and was released in the United States on May 26 by Walt Disney Studios Motion Pictures. The film received mixed reviews from critics and grossed over $569 million worldwide, including $298 million in the United States and Canada. Produced on a budget of $240.2 million, it became Disney's twenty-third most expensive film production to date.

== Plot ==
Under the Caribbean Sea, in the kingdom of Atlantica, mermaid princess Ariel is fascinated with the human world and collects human artifacts in her grotto, despite never having seen it. Her father King Triton, forbids merfolk from surfacing there because Ariel's mother was killed by a human. With her best friend Flounder, Ariel visits Scuttle, a northern gannet who provides inaccurate information about humans.

One night, Ariel sees fireworks above the ocean and surfaces to investigate. They come from the ship of Eric, whose vessel crashes against rocks during a storm. Ariel rescues Eric and brings him to shore, singing to him before leaving as he begins to regain consciousness. Triton notices Ariel's distracted behavior and learns from his advisor Sebastian that she saved a human. Enraged, he visits her grotto and demands that she promise never to return to the surface. When she refuses, he destroys her collection. Heartbroken, Ariel is approached by two moray eels working for Ursula, Triton's estranged sister and a sea witch who was banished from Atlantica fifteen years earlier.

Ariel makes a deal with Ursula to become human for three days in exchange for her voice, which Ursula stores in a nautilus shell. During that time, Ariel must receive true love's kiss to remain human permanently. Otherwise, she will return to being a mermaid, and Ursula will claim her soul. After gaining human legs, Ariel reaches the surface with Sebastian and Flounder and is rescued and taken to Eric's castle. Eric, who has been searching for his mysterious rescuer, welcomes her. They bond while exploring his collection of objects gathered during his travels.

The following day, Eric takes Ariel sightseeing. Sebastian discovers that Ursula has secretly enchanted Ariel to forget that she must kiss Eric. With help from Scuttle and Flounder, he tries to bring the couple together, but Ursula’s eels interfere. Frustrated by Ariel’s near success, Ursula transforms herself into a young woman named Vanessa and uses Ariel’s stolen voice to hypnotize Eric. Back in Atlantica, Triton has the kingdom search for Ariel and begins to regret the way he treated her.

The next morning, Ariel and her friends discover that Eric plans to announce his engagement to Vanessa, believing she is the woman who rescued him. Scuttle uncovers Ursula’s disguise and alerts Ariel. She rushes to the engagement party and breaks the nautilus shell, restoring her voice and freeing Eric from the enchantment. However, the sun sets before they can kiss, and Ariel transforms back into a mermaid. Reverting to her original form, Ursula drags her into the ocean.

Triton confronts Ursula to save Ariel, but their agreement cannot be broken. He sacrifices himself in exchange for his daughter and is turned to dust by Ursula’s eels. Ursula then declares herself Queen of the Seven Seas and takes Triton’s trident. When Eric arrives to fight her, Ariel intervenes. Ursula accidentally kills her eels, Flotsam and Jetsam, and grows into a gigantic creature using the trident. Ariel and Eric reunite on the surface just before a gigantic Ursula separates them. She then gains full control of the ocean, creating a storm and bringing sunken ships to the surface before Ariel gets on one. When Eric is in danger, Ariel commandeers a wrecked ship and impales Ursula with its broken bowsprit, killing her. Triton is resurrected, and he and Ariel recognize the sacrifices they made for each other.

Although Ariel returns to Atlantica, she remains unhappy without Eric. Following Sebastian's advice, Triton permanently transforms Ariel into a human. She reunites with Eric on the beach, and, with the blessings of both their parents and the support of both worlds, they decide to travel together.

== Cast ==
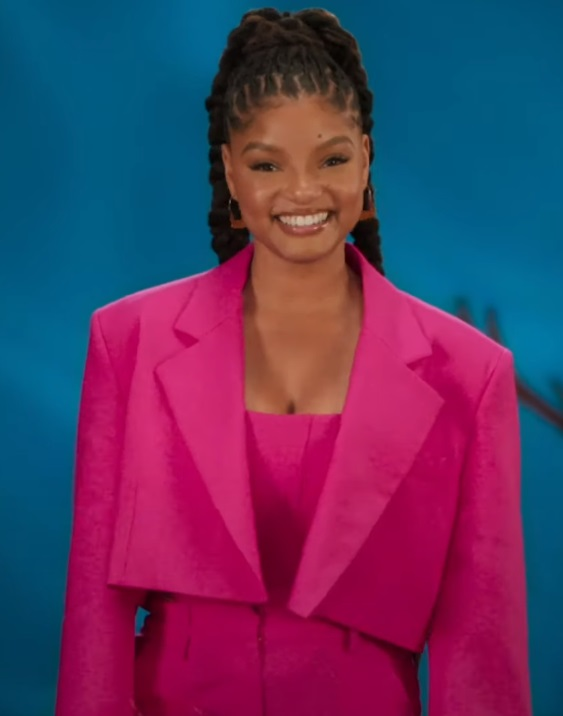
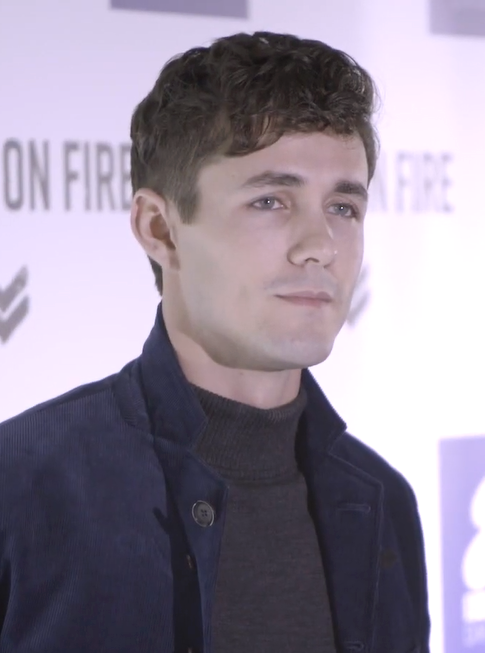
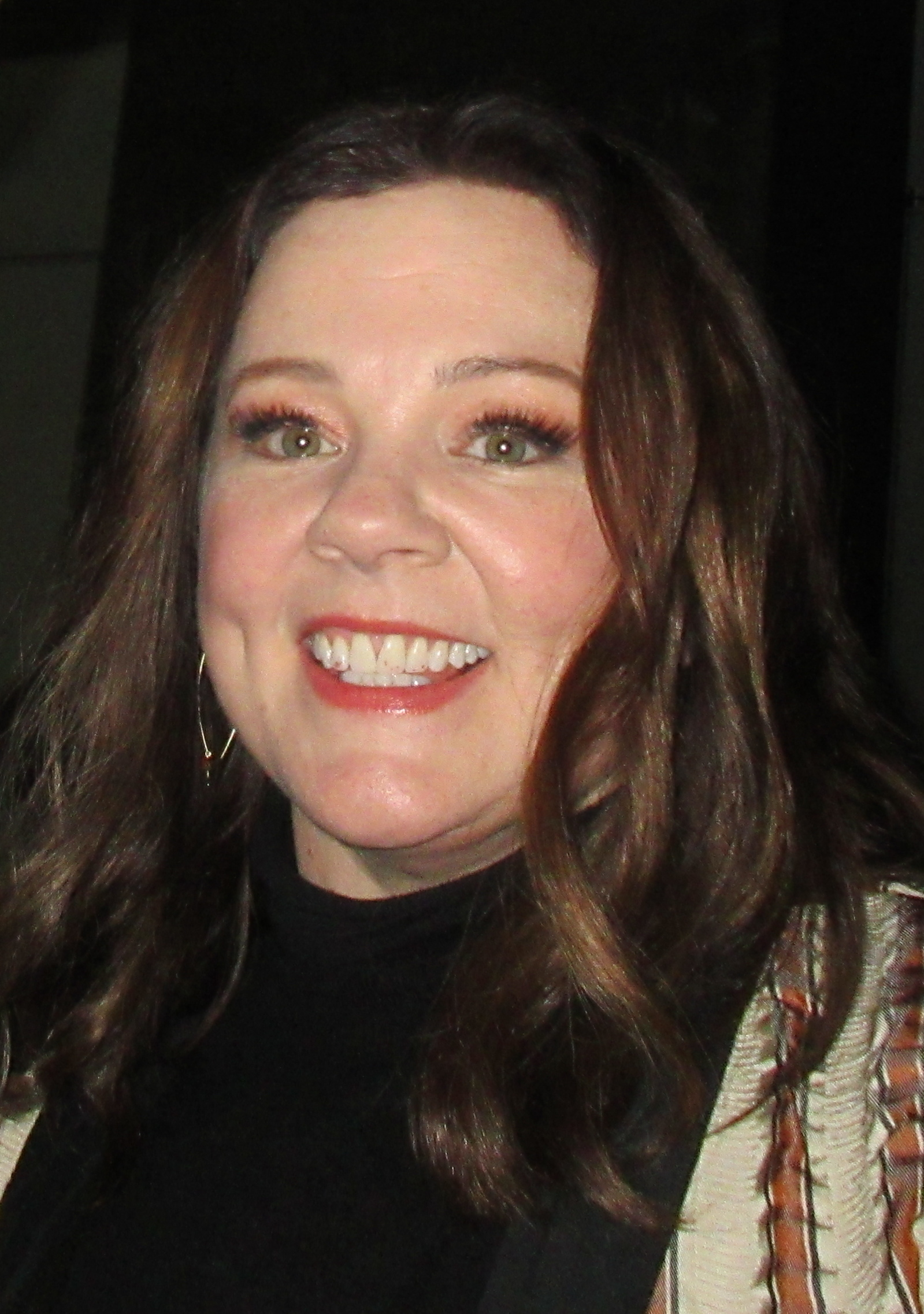
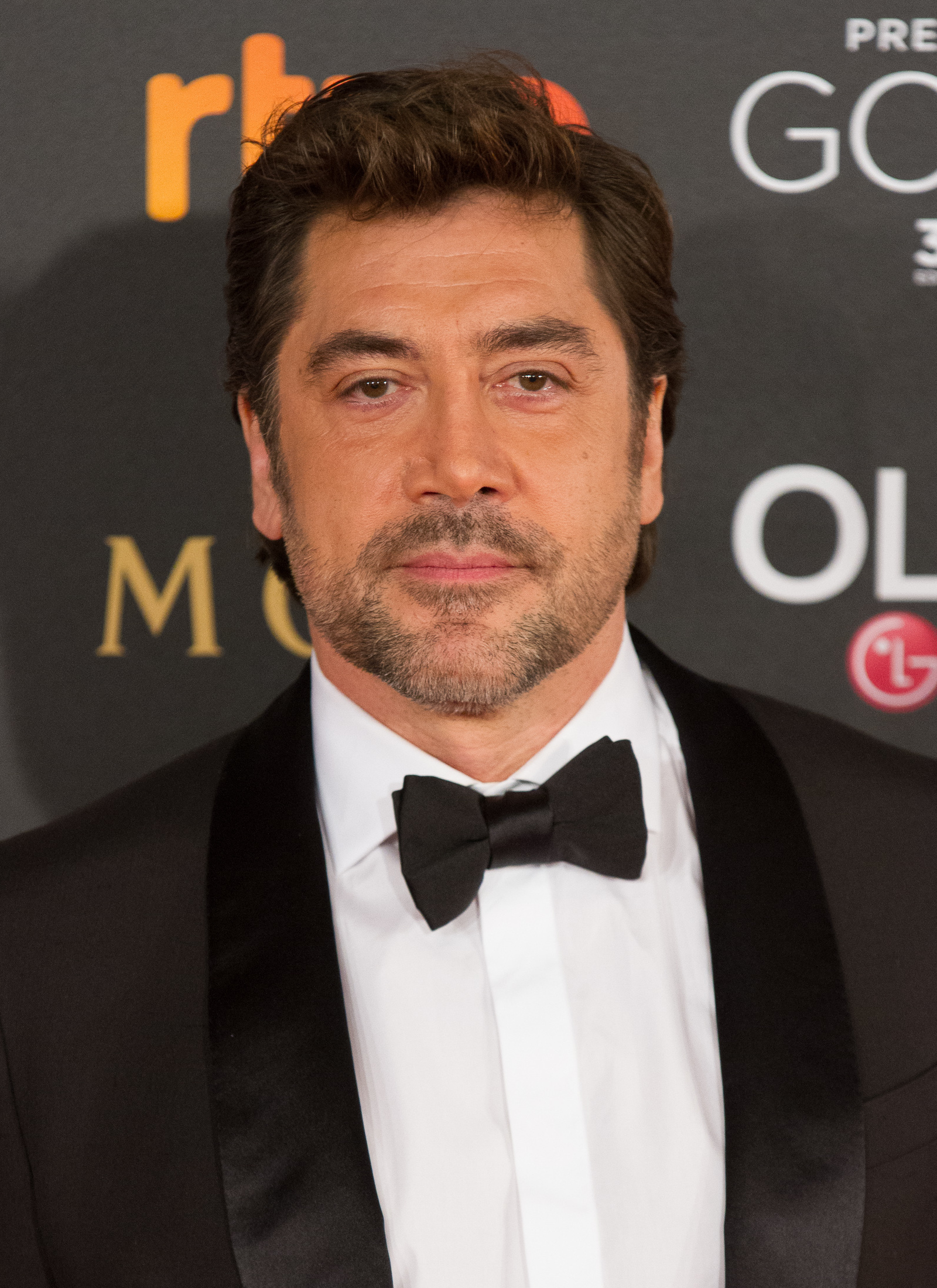
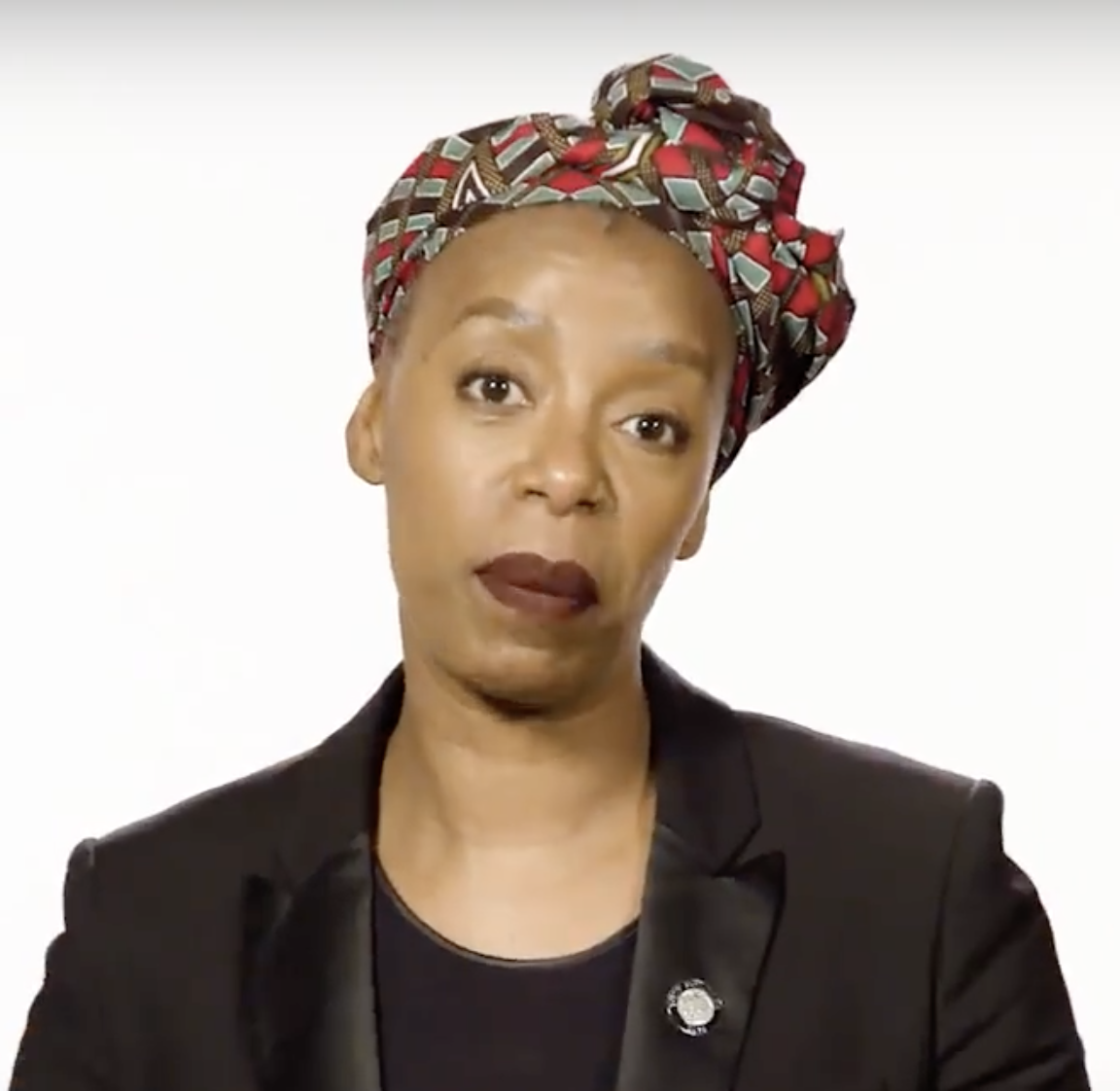
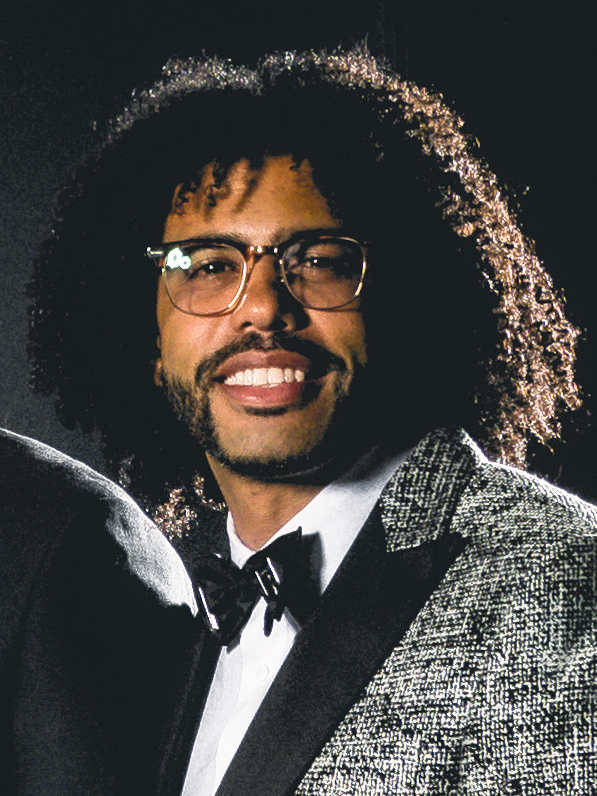
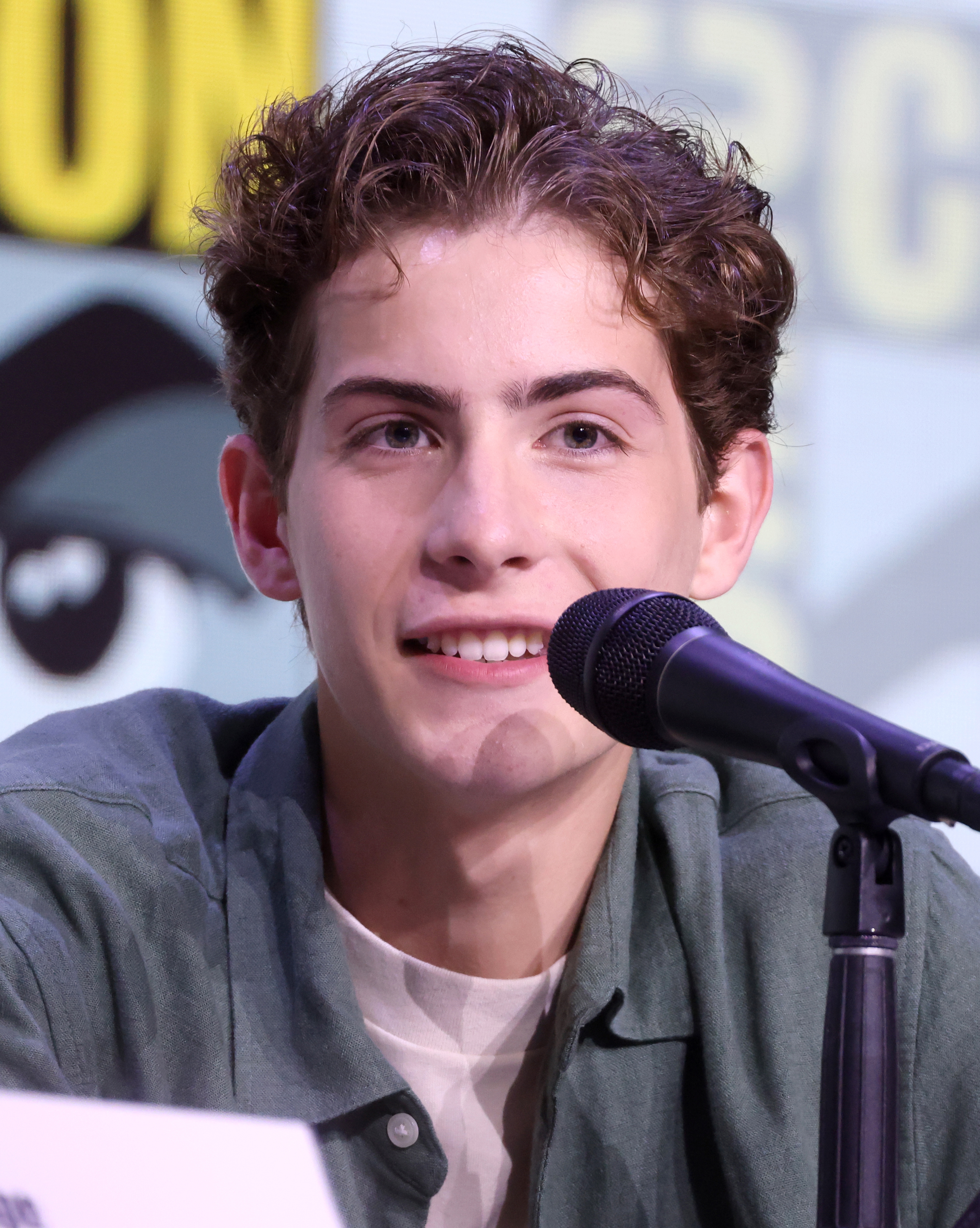
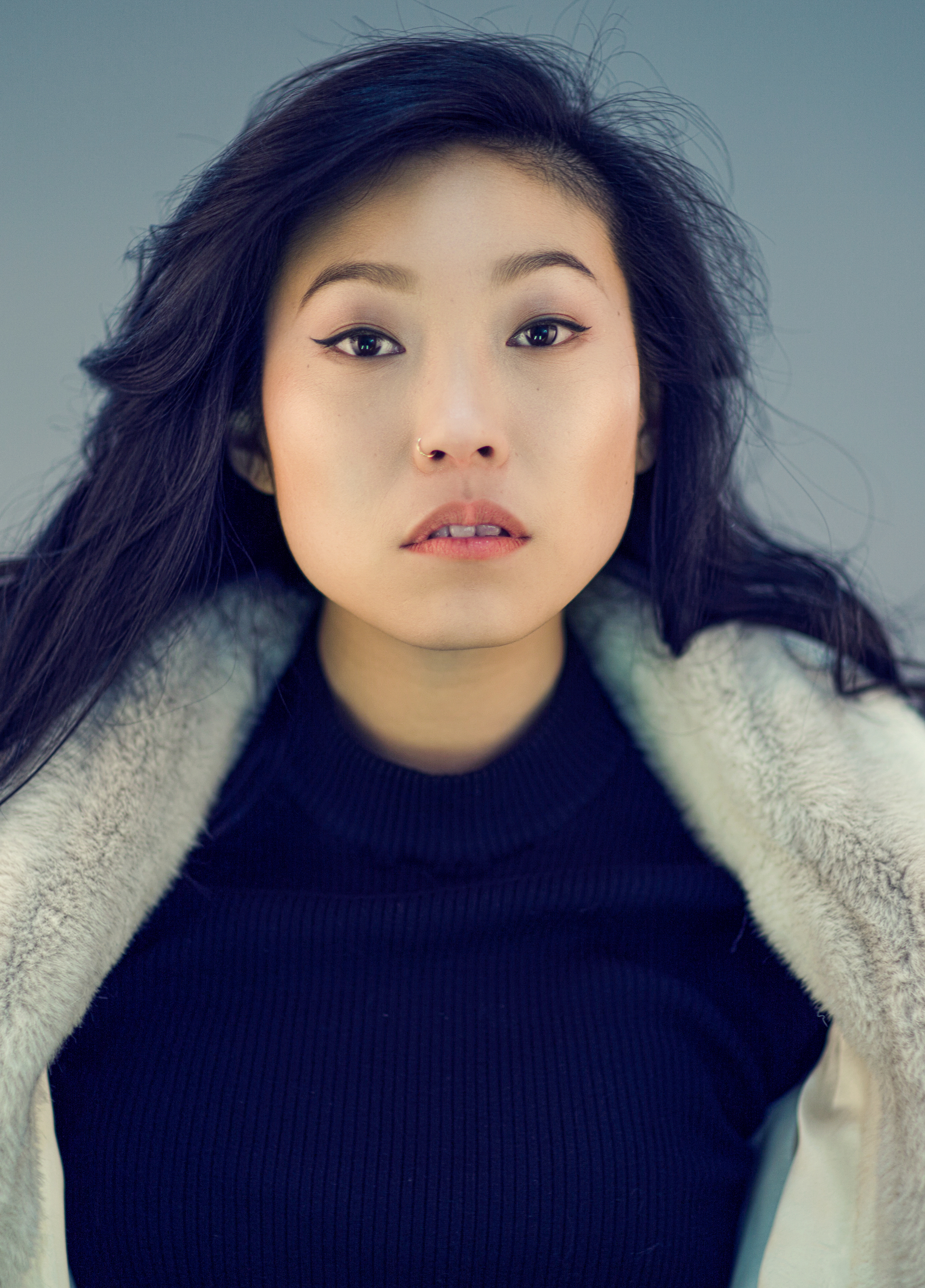
Top row: Halle Bailey, Jonah Hauer-King, Melissa McCarthy, and Javier Bardem play Ariel, Eric, Ursula and King Triton.
Bottom row: Noma Dumezweni plays Queen Selina, with Daveed Diggs, Jacob Tremblay, and Awkwafina voicing Sebastian, Flounder and Scuttle.

=== Live-action cast ===
- Halle Bailey as Ariel, a curious, adventurous, and headstrong mermaid princess and King Triton's youngest daughter who is fascinated with the human world.
- Jonah Hauer-King as Eric, an adventurer and free-spirited human prince whom Ariel falls in love with after saving him from drowning. Hauer-King described his character as "restless and inquisitive about where he is in the world, like Ariel... He's quite isolated and sensitive."
- Melissa McCarthy as Ursula, a treacherous and conniving sea witch and King Triton's estranged sister, with whom Ariel makes a deal to become a human, which is secretly part of Ursula's plan to conquer Atlantica. McCarthy described her character as "so funny. There's wit, there's manipulation. She's a great broad and at the same time, I have to think about what armor does she put in? And I don't think her mental health is great."
  - Jessica Alexander as Vanessa, Ursula's human alter ego, which she uses to sabotage her deal with Ariel. Alexander described her character as "a seductress, a temptress, the definition of a femme fatale and a sexy female villain."
- Javier Bardem as King Triton, Ariel's strict and overprotective father and the ruler of Atlantica who is prejudiced against humans due to the death of his wife at the hands of one of them. Bardem described his character as "a little bit less grumpy than the original because we were intending to bring more conflict to his behavior, like his fear and insecurity as a father. Being scared of letting his last daughter leave home ends up translating into being angry or too controlling."
- Noma Dumezweni as Queen Selina, Eric's adoptive mother and the ruler of a Caribbean island kingdom. She is a new character for the film. Dumezweni described her character as a "loving queen and a mother queen and a parent and a land lover learning about herself through letting go of her children."
- Art Malik as Sir Grimsby, the prime minister of Selina's kingdom and Eric's loyal confidant who acts as a father figure to him.

=== Voice cast ===
- Daveed Diggs as Sebastian, a loyal fiddler crab and King Triton's majordomo who watches over Ariel.
- Jacob Tremblay as Flounder, an anxious yet noble sergeant major who is Ariel's best friend.
- Awkwafina as Scuttle, a dimwitted northern gannet and a friend of Ariel's to whom she provides inaccurate descriptions of any human/surface world object Ariel finds. The character is portrayed as a female gannet instead of a male seagull as in the original to feature the character in underwater scenes.

Additionally, Martina Laird appears as Lashana, one of the maids in Eric's castle, who is based on Carlotta from the animated film; Emily Coates appears as Rosa, a young girl who works as a maid in Eric's castle; Christopher Fairbank and John Dagleish appear as Hawkins and Mulligan, two of Eric's shipmates; Jude Akuwudike appears as Joshua, a fisherman who discovers Ariel in her human form; and Russell Balogh and Adrian Christopher appear as two of King Triton's guards. Also appearing as the daughters of Triton and Ariel's sisters (renamed for the film) are Lorena Andrea as Perla, Simone Ashley as Indira, Karolina Conchet as Mala, Sienna King as Tamika, Kajsa Mohammar as Karina, and Nathalie Sorrell as Caspia.

Flotsam and Jetsam, Ursula's green moray eel minions appear. Jodi Benson, the original voice of Ariel in the animated film, cameos as a market vendor who hands Ariel a dinglehopper during her tour of the kingdom. Eric's Old English Sheepdog Max appears, portrayed by Gary and Edna respectively, with the latter being uncredited.

== Production ==
=== Development ===
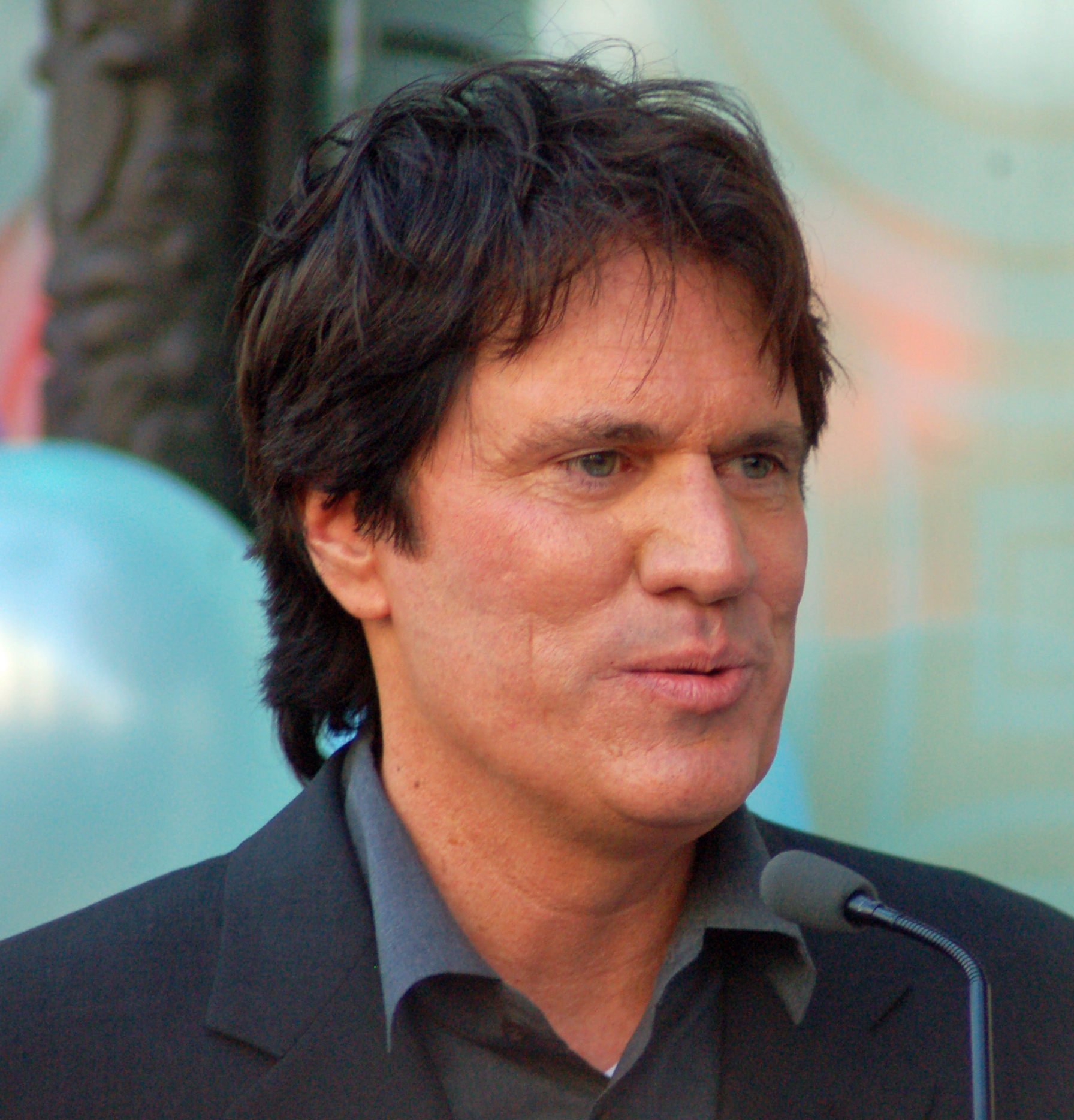
Rob Marshall directed the film.

In May 2016, Walt Disney Pictures began developing a live-action adaptation of Hans Christian Andersen's fairy tale "The Little Mermaid". Three months later, Lin-Manuel Miranda and Marc Platt signed on to produce the film, which was confirmed to be a remake of the Disney's 1989 animated film of the same name. On December 6, 2017, it was reported that Rob Marshall was being courted by the Walt Disney Company to direct the film, while Jane Goldman would serve as screenwriter. On December 5, 2018, Marshall revealed that he, along with John DeLuca and Marc Platt were hired to begin developing the project for film adaptation, and said that "John and [Marshall] have begun our work trying to explore it and figure it out", as he felt that "it's a very complicated movie to take from animation to live-action. Live-action's a whole other world so you have to be very careful about how that's done, but so we're starting the exploration phase". Later in December, Marshall was officially hired as director for the film. During an interview on December 21, 2018, Marshall revealed that the film is in very early stages of development, stating that the studio is trying to explore ways to translate the original film's story into live-action. On July 3, 2019, David Magee, who previously wrote the screenplay for Marshall's Mary Poppins Returns, was revealed to have written the script with Goldman. Magee would receive sole credit for the screenplay. On February 10, 2020, Miranda revealed that rehearsals for the film had already begun.

=== Casting ===
In the early stages of the film's development, Lindsay Lohan expressed interest in playing the role of Ariel. Zendaya was reported to have been offered the part in August 2018, but she herself eventually stated that this was "just a rumor". Halle Bailey was the first to audition for the role after Rob Marshall saw her perform Donny Hathaway's 1972 single "Where Is the Love" at the 61st Annual Grammy Awards. According to Marshall, hundreds of other girls also tried out for the part, including Odessa A'zion, but she "set the bar so high that nobody surpassed it." Hundreds of candidates auditioned for the role of Eric, including actors Asher Angel, Gavin Leatherwood, Christian Navarro, Jack Whitehall, and Cameron Cuffe, with the latter, along with Jonah Hauer-King, doing a screen test alongside Bailey. Harry Styles was in early negotiations to play the part, but ultimately turned it down in favor of doing a concert tour. Marshall later elaborated that Styles also refused because he wanted to do darker, non-musical roles.

By March 2021, Jessica Alexander was cast in an undisclosed role, which was eventually revealed to be Vanessa. Of her casting, director Rob Marshall stated it was a conscious decision to cast a relatively unknown actress as Vanessa since McCarthy was already portraying Ursula. He also said: "She's just a beautiful, beautiful actress, and she went there. It's sort of rare for someone that beautiful and charismatic to be able to then turn into the sea witch literally in front of you and just lose it. It was exciting to see that change." Alexander enjoyed playing the role, commenting that she "love[s] being demonic, and just going crazy on screen, so this was a perfect opportunity for that". Kacey Musgraves was also considered for the role.

=== Filming ===
Filming was originally scheduled to begin in London between late March and early April 2020; however, it was delayed due to the COVID-19 pandemic. Set photos at Pinewood Studios in London, England leaked a few weeks after the production was shut down, it showed aerial images featuring Prince Eric's ship as well as indoor images of what seemed to be his castle. Jacob Tremblay began recording his lines for the film right before the height of the pandemic. Filming was scheduled to re-commence on August 10, 2020. By November 2020, Disney's new CEO Bob Chapek announced that filming on all films that had been postponed during pandemic shutdowns had resumed filming, and in some cases completed principal photography.

In December 2020, McCarthy stated that she would hopefully begin filming in January 2021. The following month, Diggs discussed the large amount of work he had to do when it came to preparing for and recording dialogue for the role of Sebastian.

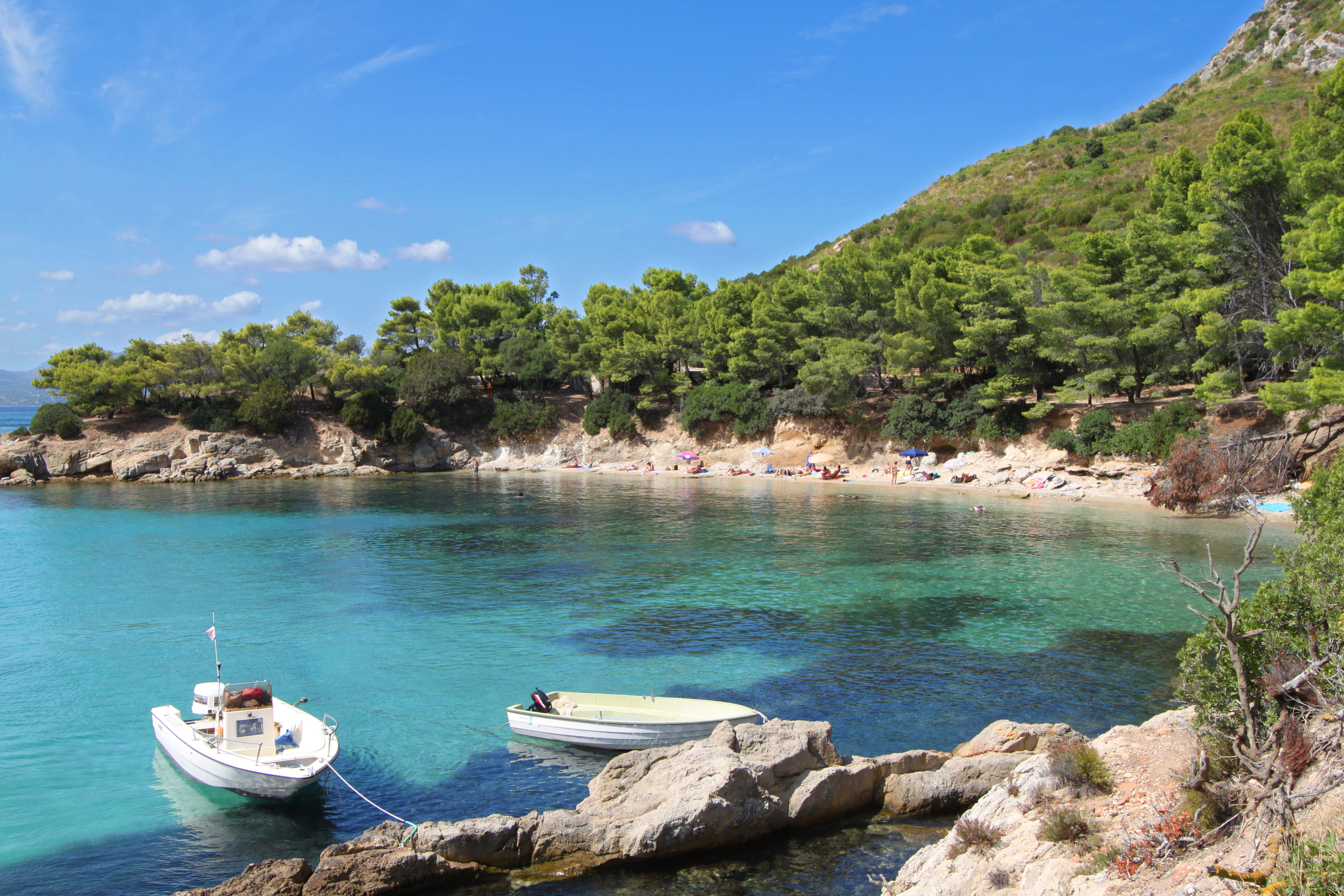
Cala Moresca in Sardinia, Italy, among the movie's filming locations

Principal photography officially began at Pinewood Studios in Iver, England on January 30, 2021. Filming for McCarthy's scenes eventually began in April 2021. On April 6, it was announced that additional filming would be happening in summer in Sardinia, Italy, for a total of "roughly three months". In June 2021, production was temporarily halted due to multiple crew members of the film contracting COVID-19. Filming resumed about a week later and officially wrapped on July 11, 2021. On December 30, 2021, Bailey shared some new behind-the-scenes photos of the set, including a glimpse of her portrayal of Ariel. The actress took to Instagram to wrap up her year and shared photos of moments of shooting the film. The first photo showed the film's script, which was blurred to avoid spoilers, but still showed her character name "Ariel" in bold print. One photo showed her swimming in Sardinia's waters, while another showed the process of film-making using CGI. In February 2023, Marshall revealed that he hopes post-production work on the film will be completed by March, saying:

"I'm very proud of the film. It's the most challenging film I've ever done, for sure. No question ... Using complicated, cutting-edge techniques to make this work. I don't think anybody's ever done an underwater musical before. I have to say every single moment of the film had to be choreographed in advance so that we could have a flow to the whole piece. It's crazy the apparatuses we worked with from wires to things called tuning forks to teeter-totters. Thank God we had the rehearsal time. You always need it on a musical anyway."

— Rob Marshall

On March 22, 2023, Bailey revealed that she had to spend 13 hours underwater during certain days of filming and that practical water tanks and CGI were used to create the underwater environments, saying "I pushed myself as far as I've ever pushed myself in life ... And I feel like the message from [Ariel] was to know that you've always had it in you." She also revealed that the film's themes were updated so that it is not put at the forefront that Ariel "leaves the ocean for a boy" in response to recent criticism surrounding the portrayal of that desire in the original film. On that, she added "I'm really excited for my version of the film because we've definitely changed that perspective ... It's way bigger than that. It's about herself, her purpose, her freedom, her life and what she wants. As women we are amazing, we are independent, we are modern, we are everything and above, and I'm glad that Disney is updating some of those themes."

=== Visual effects ===
Visual effects were provided by Industrial Light & Magic, Wētā FX, Moving Picture Company and Framestore. DNEG also provided the stereo conversion. For the "Under the Sea" sequence, Marshall called it a "big, massive musical number" and said that creating the underwater environments involved "a lot of work in advance with John DeLuca and myself creating these musical sequences, to prep it in advance from storyboards to something called pre-visualization, which is almost like a little mini-animated film, so we know how it flowed and how it worked ... You are creating a world, you're creating creatures, but it's very important to me that it feels real – you have to believe, you have to care about them, you have to follow their journey."

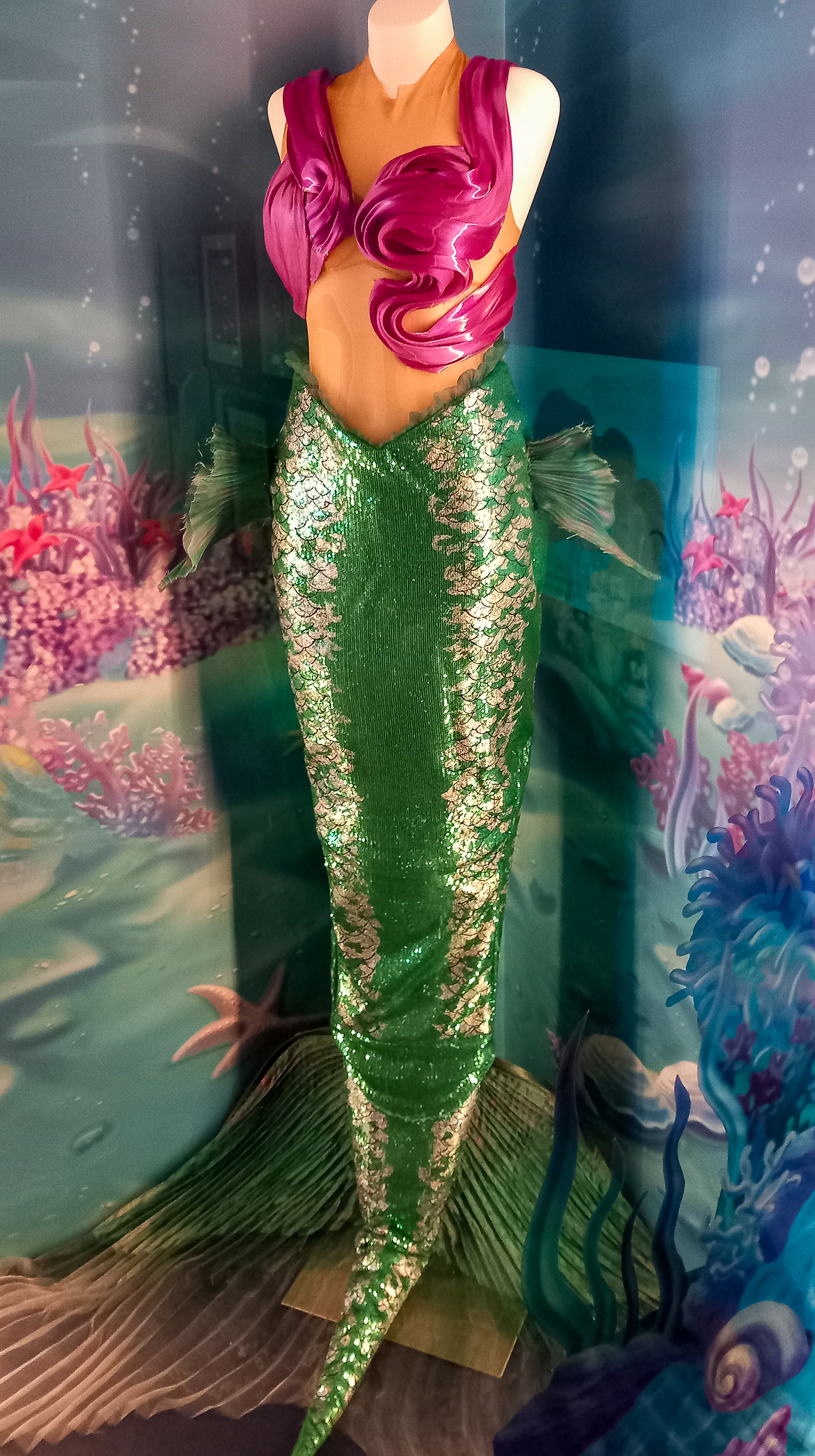
The original Little Mermaid Ariel costume

On May 19, 2023, Marshall revealed that his work on Disney's Pirates of the Caribbean: On Stranger Tides (which featured a mermaid character named Tamara) helped influence his work on The Little Mermaid, using similar live-action and CGI techniques to bring Ariel, her sisters and King Triton to life. He called it "a great launching point for us" and showed his work on Pirates to the crew and visual effects team to break down the process. The colorful tails of the merpeople characters were designed by Marshall's frequent costume designer Colleen Atwood, who used real fish as references to make each of the tails of Ariel and her sisters look more distinct from one another, and also designed the costumes for the human characters.

==== Lawsuit ====
In August 2023, special effects artist Christine Overs filed a lawsuit against the film's producers over an accident that occurred on the film set that resulted in a broken wrist. In the lawsuit, Christine seeks compensation of 150,000 euros (US$190,000). Sandcastle Pictures, the Disney-owned production company responsible for filming, has admitted responsibility for the accident but disputes the amount Overs is seeking.

== Music ==
The soundtrack album to the movie is The Little Mermaid (2023 Original Motion Picture Soundtrack). It features score and songs from the original film, three new songs composed by the original film's composer Alan Menken, Howard Ashman and Lin-Manuel Miranda. The soundtrack was released digitally on May 19, 2023, and on physical CD and vinyl on May 26, 2023, by Walt Disney Records. A deluxe edition of the album was released on the same date, featuring the complete original score.

== Release ==
The Little Mermaid held its world premiere at the Dolby Theatre in Los Angeles on May 8, 2023, followed by the London premiere at the Odeon Luxe Leicester Square on May 15. It was released theatrically on May 26, 2023, in the United States by Walt Disney Studios Motion Pictures. A sing-along edition of the film was released in theaters on August 25, 2023.

=== Marketing ===
On September 9, 2022, Rob Marshall and Halle Bailey appeared at the 2022 D23 Expo to introduce an exclusive presentation of the film's "Part of Your World" sequence, which received a positive response from the attendees, who praised Bailey's vocal performance. The film's teaser trailer was released to the public the same day. On October 13, 2022, the first poster was released to the public, which Bailey synchronously captioned on Twitter: "Words can't describe how immensely honored I feel to play the mermaid of my dreams."

In an interview with Entertainment Weekly, Marshall says that this new take on Ariel spotlights a "modern woman". He says that the character goes back to Hans Christian Andersen from another century, but at the same time in 1989, that it felt in some ways like a very modern woman, someone who sees Ariel's life differently than anyone around her, and goes to find that dream. On January 21, 2023, Disney Live Entertainment announced a casting call for character look-alike actresses to portray Bailey's version of Ariel as a character meet-and-greet at Disneyland in Anaheim, California near the "It's a Small World" attraction, Disney's Hollywood Studios at Walt Disney World in Orlando, Florida and the Walt Disney Studios park at Disneyland Paris in Paris, France, as part of the film's promotional campaign. It was later confirmed by Disney Parks that these meet-and-greets would run for a limited engagement throughout the summer, with the original, classic Ariel being reinstated afterward.

On March 12, 2023, the official trailer was shown during the 95th Academy Awards, introduced on stage by Bailey and McCarthy, and then released online alongside a new poster.

Disney spent an estimated $140 million promoting The Little Mermaid. The film had the biggest global promotional campaign for a Disney branded live-action title at $80 million in value, with partner deals with the likes of McDonald's, Booking.com, and Kellogg's.

=== Home media ===
The Little Mermaid was released by Walt Disney Studios Home Entertainment for digital download on July 25, 2023, and on Ultra HD Blu-ray, Blu-ray and DVD on September 19, 2023. The film was released on Disney+ on September 6, 2023.

In the United Kingdom, The Little Mermaid topped the Official Charts Company's Official Film Chart for the week of August 2. It retained the No. 1 position for the week ending August 9. The film ranked No. 2 for the period ending August 16, No. 3 for the week ending August 23, and No. 7 for the week ending August 30. For the week ending September 6, the film placed at No. 9 on the chart. In the United States, The Little Mermaid debuted at No. 1 on Fandango's Vudu chart of the ten most popular films for the week of July 30. It also topped the video-on-demand charts on iTunes and Google Play during the same period. The film ranked as the No. 5 best-selling physical-media title in the U.S. for September 2023, according to Circana's VideoScan chart.

The Walt Disney Company announced that The Little Mermaid was viewed 16 million times in the five days following its release on Disney+, making it the platform's most-streamed film during its debut week since the release of Hocus Pocus 2 (2022). The company defined views as total streaming time divided by runtime. The film also ranked as the most-streamed live-action Disney film premiere on the platform. Nielsen Media Research, which records streaming viewership on certain American television screens, calculated that the film was streamed for 1.374 billion minutes from September 4—10. It was the most-streamed film that week and ranked as the fourth most-streamed program overall. In the following week, from September 11–17, the film recorded 588 million minutes of watch time, making it the second most-streamed film that week. The Little Mermaid was subsequently streamed for 393 million minutes from September 18–24, remaining the second most-streamed film that week.

=== Broadcast ===
On October 6, 2024, ABC broadcast The Little Mermaid as part of its Wonderful World of Disney programming block. The airing was viewed in approximately 1.09 million households (0.87 rating), with a total audience of 1.47 million viewers (0.46 rating), including 268,500 adults aged 18–49 (0.20 rating). On June 7, 2025, The Little Mermaid aired on Freeform as part of its 30 Days of Disney programming block. The film reached about 126,000 households (0.10 rating) and 226,000 total viewers (0.07 rating), of which 92,000 were adults aged 18–49 (0.07 rating) and 104,000 were aged 25–54 (0.08 rating).

== Reception ==
=== Pre-release ===
Variety reported that the official teaser trailer of The Little Mermaid garnered more than 104 million global views during the first weekend following its release. It surpassed recent Disney live-action releases including Beauty and the Beast with 94 million, Aladdin with 74 million and Cruella with 68 million. After the release of the trailer in September 2022, videos of Black girls positively reacting to it went viral. In December 2022, the film ranked number three as the "Most Anticipated Family Film" of 2023 in a poll conducted by Fandango Media while Halle Bailey and Melissa McCarthy ranked number one as the "Most Anticipated New Performance on the Big Screen" and "Most Anticipated Villain", respectively.

Following its premiere at the 95th Academy Awards on March 12, 2023, the official trailer reportedly generated over 108 million global views within its first 24 hours. It is now among the most watched trailers for any reimagined title in Disney's growing stable of live-action adaptations, and the biggest for a Disney live-action title since the 2019 remake of The Lion King.

An early private test screening of the film's final cut took place on April 30, 2023, at The Whitby Hotel in New York City. The event, hosted by Marshall and DeLuca, was attended by 80 celebrities and industry professionals.

=== Box office ===
The Little Mermaid grossed $298.2 million in the United States and Canada, and $271.5 million in other territories, for a worldwide total of $569.6 million. Disney received a total of £46.6 million ($56.8 million) in tax reimbursements equivalent to 25% of the film's UK-based net spend, from the UK government's Film Tax Relief scheme.

In the United States and Canada, The Little Mermaid—released alongside The Machine, Kandahar, About My Father, and You Hurt My Feelings—was projected to gross $120–125 million from 4,320 theaters over its four-day Memorial Day opening weekend. The film made $38 million on its first day, including $10.3 million from Thursday night previews. It went on to debut to $95.6 million in the traditional three-day weekend, and $118.8 million over the four-day frame, topping the box office and making it the fifth highest Memorial Day opening in history (20th after inflation adjustment). In its second weekend, the film declined 57% to $41.4 million while finishing in second place to newcomer Spider-Man: Across the Spider-Verse. The film then made $23.2 million in its third weekend, finishing third behind newcomer Transformers: Rise of the Beasts and Across the Spider-Verse. It remained in the top ten for five more weeks. In the United States and Canada, The Little Mermaid was the sixth-highest-grossing film of 2023.

Outside of the U.S. and Canada, the opening weekend box office results fell short of expectations, grossing just $68.3 million. A financial insider described the film's opening weekend to Deadline as "not a huge disappointment, but a disappointment, nonetheless." The film's biggest markets were Mexico ($8.5 million), the United Kingdom ($6.3 million), Italy ($4.7 million), Brazil and Australia (both around $4 million). The film also grossed $415,672 in India and $184,214 in South Africa during its opening weekend.

The film's biggest markets in gross value were the United Kingdom ($34.1 million), Japan ($23.9 million), Mexico ($20.9 million), Brazil (17.3 million) and Australia ($15 million). In the Philippines, the film earned more than The Super Mario Bros. Movie and Guardians of the Galaxy Vol. 3 at the box office. Its performance in China and South Korea was considered disappointing; it grossed only $3.6 million in China, and $4.4 million in South Korea in first 10 days. In contrast, The Hollywood Reporter reported that the film had achieved success in Japan after it had earned $10.3 million in its first two weeks of release.

=== Critical response ===
The film received mixed reviews from critics. On the review aggregator website Rotten Tomatoes, 67% of 349 critics' reviews are positive, with an average rating of 6.3/10. The website's consensus reads: "With Halle Bailey making a major splash in the title role, Disney's live-action Little Mermaid ranks among the studio's most enjoyable reimaginings." Metacritic, which uses a weighted average, assigned the film a score of 59 out of 100, based on 54 critics, indicating "mixed or average" reviews. Audiences polled by CinemaScore gave the film an average grade of "A" on an A+ to F scale, while those polled by PostTrak gave it an overall 91% positive score, with 76% saying they would definitely recommend it.

Brian Lowry of CNN wrote that the film "holds up nicely under the weight of those expectations, preserving the original's essence while updating undernourished aspects of it and riding a warm, hard-to-resist wave of nostalgia." Ross Bonaime of Collider wrote that it "might not match the greatness of the original, but it's the rare remake that feels worthy of being part of our world." Lex Briscuso of TheWrap called it "a fresh take on a beloved classic that isn't afraid to take a fairy tale and make it as real as it can, inviting its audience to dive into uncharted waters alongside its engaging and charming central characters." Pete Hammond of Deadline Hollywood wrote that "Marshall has made a movie with all the magic required to pull it off and, if not replace the original in our hearts, at least has made a movie that can stand next to that one to also become a memorable part of our cinematic world." Vanessa Armstrong of /Film called it a live-action remake "done well" that "improves on the original" and had no doubt that "it will become an indelible part of many a young person's childhood, and I can't wait to watch it with my daughter."

Zoë Rose Bryant of Next Best Picture praised its sense of nostalgia and called Bailey and Hauer-King the "stars of the show". She did, however, criticize the visual effects, but said that they were "far better than the oft-maligned trailers would lead you to believe." Molly Edwards of Total Film gave it four stars out of five and called it "A sparkling, enchanting new spin that out-swims the original, with a pitch-perfect performance from Halle Bailey." Brian Truitt of USA Today wrote that "While not everything goes swimmingly, Halle Bailey splendidly buoys this Mermaid as the naive underwater youngster with dreams of exploring the surface." Maureen Lee Lenker of Entertainment Weekly praised the performances of Bailey, Hauer-King and McCarthy, and named the "Under the Sea" sequence as the film's best musical highlight. Peter Debruge of Variety lauded the film, saying that "Halle Bailey is all the reason that any audience should need to justify Disney revisiting this classic."

Ann Hornaday of The Washington Post called it an "on-the-other-fin mixed bag of a movie that honors its source material with a big, color-saturated production, while never precisely proving that it ever needed to exist." Rachel LaBonte of Screen Rant felt mixed, saying that the film is "bolstered by deeper characterization and a grand scope, even as it grapples with flaws." Helen O'Hara of Empire called it "Another 'live-action' remake that's darker and less compelling than the animated original, but it's saved by Bailey's charming performance, McCarthy's sass and the story's own eternal magic." Moira MacDonald of The Seattle Times praised Bailey's performance, saying that "her singing voice has both sweetness and power, and her smile is the sort on which dreams dance."

On the critical side, Angelica Jade Bastién of Vulture panned the film, writing that with this film, "Disney betrays its own lack of imagination and an essential misreading of what made its original children's fare such a joy to audiences in the first place." Hillary Busis of Vanity Fair criticized the runtime and called it an "uneasy mix of carbon copy and superfluous added material, presented in "live-action" that looks and feels (and is) as artificial as Lightning McQueen." Johnny Oleksinski of New York Post wrote that "Despite real actors, CGI and brand new material, 'Mermaid' is the studio's latest flesh-and-blood cash grab that's more lifeless than far better two-dimensional painted drawings." Justin Chang of Los Angeles Times wrote that "What's on-screen too often feels like wan, second-rate imitation, and the few differences seem motivated less by a spirit of imagination than one of joyless anxiety." Kat Rosenfield, writing for UnHerd, panned the film for being "propaganda" and for paling in comparison to the original, writing that "This is perhaps the worst thing about Disney's contemporary remakes: not that they are blatant cash grabs, but that they are infantilizing. The original Little Mermaid placed infinitely more trust in its intended audience of children than the new version places in those same children, now that they're grown up." Kelly Lawler, writing for USA Today, panned the film and noted that the story does not translate well to live-action as it did in animation and was particularly critical of the uncanny valley CGI and murky lighting, writing that "Every change − to aesthetics, to story, to soundtracks, to length − that is required to make these films 'live action' chips away at the magic of the originals. This relentless pursuit of realism doesn't make a good kids' movie: It may be dark underwater in the real ocean, but we want to see Ariel dance properly lit on the screen. The new films are too long, too monotone, too bland and full of photorealistic talking animals that range from boring to horrifying."

Lindsey Bahr of Associated Press wrote that "For all its pizazz, everything about this Little Mermaid is just more muted. Miranda's new songs are odd, too, and don't seem to fit." "The Scuttlebutt" musical number was widely criticized by critics and audiences for Awkwafina's vocal performance, Lin-Manuel Miranda's lyrics (particularly the line "Remember the swamp? Remember my song in the swamp? When I was like 'Womp, chicka womp-womp, chicka womp-woooomp'") and its rap style not fitting in with the musical style of the other songs. Raven Brunner of Decider called the number "awkward" and that it felt "forced". A. Felicia Wade of DiscussingFilm wrote that "Considering the setting, it's really out of place for the film in general."

John Musker, the co-writer and co-director of the original 1989 film, disapproved of the film stating: "They didn't play up the father-daughter story, and that was the heart of the movie, in a way. And the crab — you could look at live animals in a zoo and they have more expression."

=== Controversies ===
After the announcement of Bailey's involvement in July 2019 and the release of first teaser in September 2022, the film gained negative responses and backlash from the public for casting an African-American actress as Ariel, who was Caucasian with red hair in the 1989 animated film. Arguments for the negative response have included the fact that a black mermaid does not adhere to the original story (Hans Christian Andersen's description of the mermaid is that "her skin was as clear and delicate as a rose-leaf, and her eyes as blue as the deepest sea", and Andersen also wrote that the mermaid was "stretching her white arms up", and that after becoming human, "she had the loveliest pair of white legs any young maid could hope to have"), the claim that the adaptation should be as close to the original as possible, and the idea that mermaids should be pale, not black, as they are underwater creatures.

Criticism of the casting after the teaser trailer release became viral and elicited the hashtag #NotMyAriel. Many media outlets as well as Lin-Manuel Miranda, the film's producer and lyricist, criticized the negative response and described it as being racist. Stuart Heritage of The Guardian argued, "The boring spat over the Disney trailer makes idiots of us all – whether Ariel is Black or White, it is clearly a film that should rightfully be ignored then forgotten forever", suggesting instead that there should be a "grotesque scaly mutant as the lead".

During an interview in August 2019, Bailey said that "[she doesn't] pay attention to the negativity", while Auliʻi Cravalho, who played Ariel in a musical presentation as a part of The Wonderful World of Disney, expressed excitement at watching Bailey's portrayal of the character. Jodi Benson, the voice actress for Ariel in the 1989 film, praised Bailey, stating, "I think that the spirit of a character is what really matters". Brandy Norwood, the first woman of color to play Cinderella in the 1997 Disney television film of the same, and Anika Noni Rose, the voice of Tiana (Disney's first official African-American Princess), also both praised the casting of Bailey as Ariel. Rachel Zegler, who played Maria in Steven Spielberg's 2021 film version of West Side Story and the titular role in Disney's 2025 live-action remake of Snow White, also voiced her support for Bailey. In February 2023, Bailey said that she was trying to ignore the criticisms leveled by racist trolls on social media and focus on the anticipation for the film's release. In a cover story for The Face, Bailey further added "I know people are like: 'It's not about race.' But now that I'm her... People don't understand that when you're Black there's this whole other community... It's so important for us to see ourselves."

In May 2023, an editorial from Chinese state-run tabloid Global Times accused Disney of "forced inclusion of minorities" and "lazy and irresponsible storytelling", echoing the views of some social media users in China, Japan, and South Korea. The Global Times similarly attributed the film's poor performance in China to "Disney turning classic tales into 'sacrificial lambs' for political correctness."

In April 2023, Forbes reported that the visuals and CGI of the film, which it described as "an easy target for criticism", sparked viral discussions, criticism and memes on social media. Deadline Hollywood reported that the film was suffering from review bombing online, and that sites such as IMDb in the United States, Canada, United Kingdom, Brazil, and Mexico, and AlloCiné in France had added warnings to the rating pages for the film about "unusual" activity. IMDb's warning read, "Our rating mechanism has detected unusual voting activity on this title. To preserve the reliability of our rating system, an alternate weighting calculation has been applied." Deadline Hollywood cited these low user ratings as well as "backlash... over the casting of star Halle Bailey in the title role" in countries such as Korea, China, France, and Germany as contributing factors in the disappointing overseas box office.

=== Accolades ===
Award	Date of ceremony	Category	Recipient(s)	Result	Ref.
The Queerties	February 28, 2023	Next Big Thing	The Little Mermaid	Won	
Golden Trailer Awards	June 29, 2023	Best Original Score	"Above" (Level Up AV)	Nominated	
The Bulletin Awards	August 18, 2023	Best Actress In A Motion Picture	Halle Bailey	Won	
The Bulletin Awards	August 18, 2023	Film of the Year	The Little Mermaid	Won	
Hollywood Music in Media Awards	November 15, 2023	Original Song — Sci-Fi/Fantasy Film	Alan Menken and Lin-Manuel Miranda ("For The First Time")	Nominated	
Hollywood Music in Media Awards	November 15, 2023	Original Song — Sci-Fi/Fantasy Film	Alan Menken and Lin-Manuel Miranda ("Wild Uncharted Waters")	Nominated	
Hollywood Music in Media Awards	November 15, 2023	Best Song – Onscreen Performance (Film)	Halle Bailey ("For The First Time")	Nominated	
Hollywood Music in Media Awards	November 15, 2023	Music Themed Film, Biopic, or Musical	The Little Mermaid	Nominated	
North Texas Film Critics Association	December 14, 2023	Best Newcomer	Halle Bailey (also for The Color Purple)	Nominated	
Black Reel Awards	January 16, 2024	Outstanding Breakthrough Performance	Halle Bailey	Nominated	
Black Reel Awards	January 16, 2024	Outstanding Soundtrack	The Little Mermaid	Nominated	
Saturn Awards	February 4, 2024	Best Fantasy Film	The Little Mermaid	Nominated	
Saturn Awards	February 4, 2024	Best Supporting Actress in a Film	Melissa McCarthy	Nominated	
Saturn Awards	February 4, 2024	Best Younger Actor in a Film	Halle Bailey	Nominated	
Saturn Awards	February 4, 2024	Best Music in a Film	Alan Menken	Nominated	
Set Decorators Society of America Awards	February 13, 2024	Best Achievement in Décor/Design of a Comedy or Musical Feature Film	Gordon Sim and John Myhre	Nominated	
Annie Awards	February 17, 2024	Outstanding Achievement for Character Animation in a Live Action Production	Pablo Grillo, Kayn Garcia, Ferran Casas, Stuart Ellis, and Joseph Lewis	Nominated	
People's Choice Awards	February 18, 2024	The Movie of the Year	The Little Mermaid	Nominated	
People's Choice Awards	February 18, 2024	The Female Movie Star of the Year	Halle Bailey	Nominated	
People's Choice Awards	February 18, 2024	The Movie Performance of the Year	Melissa McCarthy	Nominated	
The Fidos Awards	March 10, 2024	Blockbuster Bowser	Gary, the Australian labradoodle (aka Max, the Old English Sheepdog)	Won	
NAACP Image Awards	March 16, 2024	Outstanding Actress in a Motion Picture	Halle Bailey	Nominated	
NAACP Image Awards	March 16, 2024	Outstanding Soundtrack/Compilation Album	The Little Mermaid	Nominated	
BET Awards	June 30, 2024	Best Movie	The Little Mermaid	Nominated	
BET Awards	June 30, 2024	Best Actress	Halle Bailey (also for The Color Purple)	Nominated	
Nickelodeon Kids' Choice Awards	July 13, 2024	Favorite Movie	The Little Mermaid	Nominated	
Nickelodeon Kids' Choice Awards	July 13, 2024	Favorite Movie Actress	Halle Bailey	Nominated	
Nickelodeon Kids' Choice Awards	July 13, 2024	Favorite Movie Actress	Melissa McCarthy	Nominated	
Nickelodeon Kids' Choice Awards	July 13, 2024	Favorite Villain	Melissa McCarthy	Nominated	

== In other media ==
=== Printed adaptations ===
A series of books based on the film was released on April 11, 2023, by Disney Press. It includes an illustrated picture book titled The Little Mermaid: Make a Splash by Ashley Franklin and Paul Kellam; the guidebook The Little Mermaid: Guide to Merfolk detailing the depictions of Ariel, her sisters, and universe from the film by Eric Geron; the novelization of the film titled The Little Mermaid: The Novelization by Faith Noelle; The Little Mermaid: This is Ariel by Colin Hosten; and the young adult novel The Little Mermaid: Against the Tide by American author J. Elle. The novel serves as a prequel. It featured on The New York Times Best Seller list, where it spent several weeks in the top ten and reached the fifth spot in the category "Young Adult Hardcover Books".

=== Spin-off television series ===
In June 2023, a CGI-animated series inspired by the film was announced for Disney Junior. The series, entitled Ariel, follows a young version of the titular character whose design takes influence from Bailey's portrayal. The series premiered on June 27, 2024.

== Future ==
In October 2022, after the positive responses from black children watching the trailer, rumors emerged that Disney had contacted Halle Bailey to negotiate a possible sequel. In April 2023, Marshall hinted at the potential for sequels if the film is successful: "It's a classic story that has a lot of characters and a lot of interesting stories. I do think it's right for certain things. But you have to see how a movie plays, and how it does... I think there's always opportunity to find stories within stories. That's always a wonderful thing." The following month, Bailey and Jonah Hauer-King spoke about the animated sequel The Little Mermaid II: Return to the Sea, saying that they liked it and they would agree to reprise their roles if it were adapted into live action.

== See also ==
- List of films about witchcraft
