= Into the Woods (film) =

2014 film produced by Walt Disney Pictures

- Theatrical release poster
- Directed by: Rob Marshall
- Screenplay by: James Lapine
- Based on: Into the Woods by Stephen Sondheim; James Lapine
- Produced by: Rob Marshall; John DeLuca; Marc Platt; Callum McDougall
- Starring: Meryl Streep; Emily Blunt; James Corden; Anna Kendrick; Chris Pine; Tracey Ullman; Christine Baranski; Johnny Depp
- Cinematography: Dion Beebe
- Edited by: Wyatt Smith
- Music by: Stephen Sondheim
- Production companies: Walt Disney Pictures; Lucamar Productions; Marc Platt Productions
- Distributed by: Walt Disney Studios; Motion Pictures
- Release dates: December 8, 2014 (Ziegfeld Theatre); December 25, 2014 (United States)
- Running time: 124 minutes
- Country: United States
- Language: English
- Budget: $50 million
- Box office: $212.9 million

Into the Woods is a 2014 American musical fantasy film directed by Rob Marshall, with a screenplay by James Lapine based on his and Stephen Sondheim's 1987 Broadway musical of the same name. Produced by Walt Disney Pictures, it features an ensemble cast, including Meryl Streep, Emily Blunt, James Corden, Anna Kendrick, Chris Pine, Tracey Ullman, Christine Baranski, and Johnny Depp. The film is centred on a childless couple who set out to end a curse placed on them by a vengeful witch, and the characters are forced to experience the consequences of their actions. It is inspired by the Grimm Brothers' fairy-tales of "Little Red Riding Hood", "Cinderella", "Jack and the Beanstalk", and "Rapunzel".

After several unsuccessful attempts by other studios and producers to adapt the musical to film, Disney announced in 2012 that it was producing an adaptation, with Marshall directing and John DeLuca serving as producer. Principal photography commenced in September 2013, and took place entirely in the United Kingdom, including at Shepperton Studios in London.

Into the Woods had its world premiere in New York City on December 8, 2014, and was released theatrically in the United States on December 25, 2014. It was commercially successful and received generally positive reviews, receiving praise for its acting performances (particularly Streep and Blunt), visual style, production values, and musical numbers, and criticism for its tone in the final act. Into the Woods was named one of the top-eleven best films of 2014 by the American Film Institute; the film received three Academy Award nominations, including a Best Supporting Actress nomination for Streep, and three Golden Globe Award nominations, including Best Motion Picture – Musical or Comedy.

== Plot ==
A Baker and his wife wish for a child but suffer under a curse laid upon their family by a Witch. The Witch had found the baker's father robbing her garden when his wife was pregnant, and demanded their baby in return. Because the Baker's father also stole her magic beans, the Witch's own mother punished her with the curse of age and ugliness. The Witch can lift the curse and allow the Baker and his wife to have a child only if they obtain four items for a potion to break her curse, to restore her youth and beauty: a cow as white as milk, a cape as red as blood, hair as yellow as corn, and a slipper as pure as gold—none of which she is allowed to touch.

The Witch's demands bring the Baker and his wife into contact with Jack, who is selling his beloved cow, Milky-White, and to whom the Baker offers the Witch's stolen magic beans, found in his father's coat pocket. When Jack's Mother tosses the beans away, they grow into a huge beanstalk. The Baker and his wife also encounter Red Riding Hood, who had visited to buy from their bakery on her way to her grandmother's house, and notice her red cape. The blonde Rapunzel (the Witch's adopted daughter and Baker's biological sister), is observed by the Baker's wife letting her hair down for her Prince. Cinderella runs into the Baker's wife while fleeing her Prince and whose ball outfit includes gold slippers.

After a series of failed attempts and misadventures, the Baker and his wife are finally able to gather the necessary items. After the Witch regains her youth and beauty after drinking the potion, each of the characters receives a "happy ending". The Baker and his wife have a son; Cinderella marries the Prince; Rapunzel is freed from the Witch by the Prince's brother, whom she marries; Jack provides for his mother by stealing riches from the Giant in the sky, courtesy of the beanstalk, and kills the pursuing Giant by cutting down the beanstalk; and Red Riding Hood and her grandmother are saved from the Big Bad Wolf.

However, each of the characters learns that their endings don't remain happy: the Baker is worried that he is a poor father to his newborn baby; the Baker's wife lets the Prince temporarily seduce her; Cinderella is disenchanted by her cheating Prince; and the Witch lost her powers in exchange for her youth and beauty and is rejected by Rapunzel, who then runs off with her Prince. The growth of a second beanstalk from the last remaining magic bean allows the Giant's widow to climb down and threaten the kingdom if no one delivers Jack in retribution for killing her husband. The characters attempt to find and protect Jack. In the process, Red Riding Hood's mother and grandmother, as well as Jack's mother, are killed, and the Baker's wife is killed after she considers having an affair with Cinderella's Prince. The Baker, Cinderella, Jack and Red Riding Hood all blame each other for their actions that led to the tragedy, ultimately blaming the Witch for growing the beans in the first place. She curses them all for their inability to accept any responsibility, as well as their refusal to hand Jack over. Casting all the remaining beans away, the Witch begs her mother to punish her again, and she abandons the group by melting into a large pit of boiling tar.

The remaining characters resolve to kill the threatening Giant's widow, though they discuss the complicated morality of retribution and revenge in the process. They lure the Giant's widow into stepping in the tar pit, where she is attacked by Cinderella's birds and rocks slung by Jack and the Baker. She trips and falls, with a tree crushing her. With the Giant's widow dead, the characters move forward with their lives. The Baker, thinking of his wife, is determined to be a good father. Cinderella decides to leave her Prince and help the Baker with Jack and Red Riding Hood, who are now orphans and will be moving into the bakery. The Baker comforts his son by retelling the film's story, as it ends with the Witch's moral, where children will listen and learn from their parents' actions and behaviors.

== Cast ==
- Meryl Streep as Witch
- Emily Blunt as Baker's Wife
- James Corden as Baker
- Anna Kendrick as Cinderella
- Chris Pine as Cinderella's Prince
- Johnny Depp as Wolf
- Lilla Crawford as Little Red Riding Hood
- Daniel Huttlestone as Jack
- Billy Magnussen as Rapunzel's Prince
- MacKenzie Mauzy as Rapunzel
- Tracey Ullman as Jack's Mother
- Christine Baranski as Cinderella's Stepmother
- Tammy Blanchard as Florinda
- Lucy Punch as Lucinda
- Frances de la Tour as Giant
- Simon Russell Beale as Baker's Father
- Richard Glover as the Steward
- Joanna Riding as Cinderella's Mother
- Annette Crosbie as Granny
- Molly as Milky-White

== Stage-to-screen changes ==
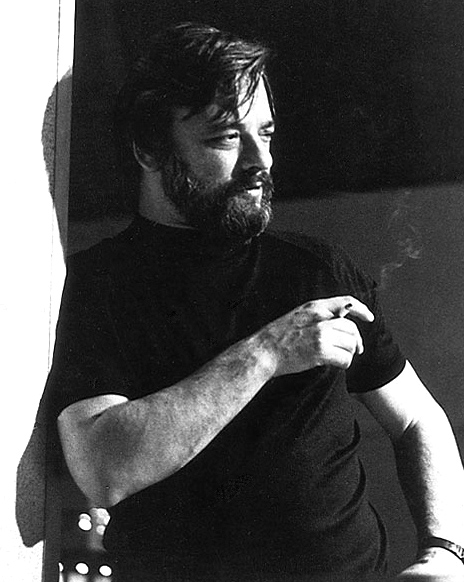
Several alterations to the musical were made for the film, with the approval of Stephen Sondheim (pictured), and James Lapine.

While it was initially reported that Disney had decided to make some major plot changes for the film version, Stephen Sondheim revealed that this was not the case and that any changes in the film version had been approved by him and James Lapine.

The film does differ from the stage production. The songs "I Guess This Is Goodbye", "Maybe They're Magic", "First Midnight" and "Second Midnight" interludes, "Ever After" (Act I finale of the original play), "So Happy", "Into the Woods" Reprise, "Agony" Reprise and "No More" (performed by the Baker) were cut from the film, although both "Ever After" and "No More" are used as instrumentals in the film. Meanwhile, many of the songs in the film have slightly different lyrics than their stage counterparts due to the tweaking of story lines.

Other changes include a major reduction of the significant role of the "mysterious man", who manipulates much of the action in the first act and is eventually revealed to be the Baker's father. Additionally, the character of the narrator was cut, and the film is instead narrated by the Baker. The minor role of Cinderella's father was cut; he is instead mentioned as deceased. Due to the film's compressed story line, Rapunzel's pregnancy is eliminated, as is the subplot where the two princes have affairs with Snow White and Sleeping Beauty. In the film, the Giant's wife first attacks during the marriages of Cinderella and Rapunzel to their respective princes; in the stage show, the Giant's wife first attacks the Witch's garden. Rapunzel's ultimate fate is also changed: rather than being killed by the Giant, she refuses to cooperate with the Witch and flees with her prince.

== Production ==
=== Early development ===
Early attempts to adapt Into the Woods to film occurred in the early 1990s, with a script by Lowell Ganz and Babaloo Mandel. A reading was held with a cast that included Robin Williams as the Baker, Goldie Hawn as the Baker's Wife, Cher as the Witch, Danny DeVito as the Giant, Steve Martin as the Wolf, and Roseanne as Jack's Mother. By 1991, Columbia Pictures and Jim Henson Productions were also developing a film adaptation with Craig Zadan as producer and Rob Minkoff as director. In 1997, Columbia put the film into turnaround, with Minkoff still attached as director, and Billy Crystal, Meg Ryan, and Susan Sarandon reportedly in talks to star. After the report by Variety, a film adaptation of Into the Woods remained inactive for 15 years.

=== Disney development ===
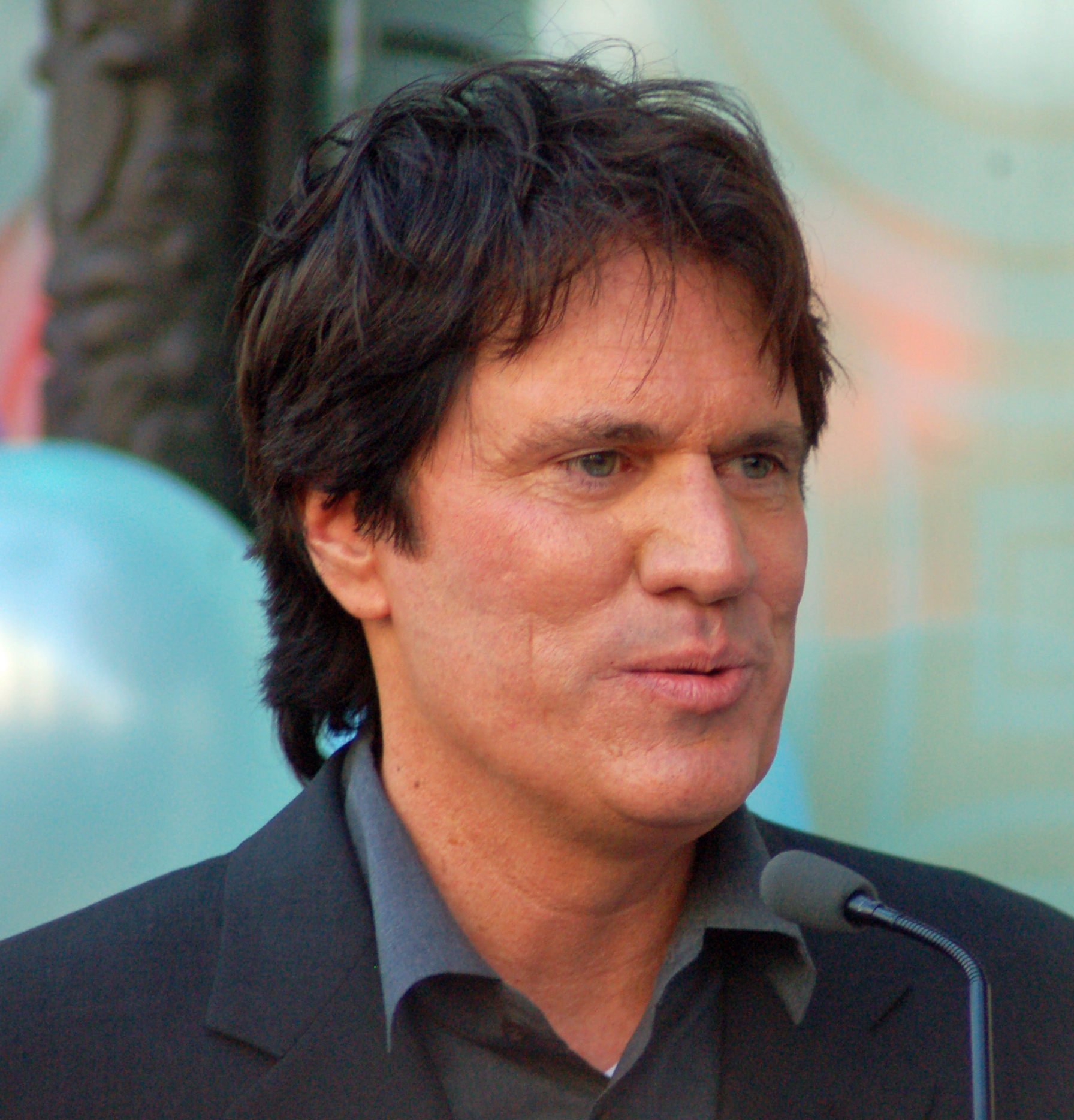
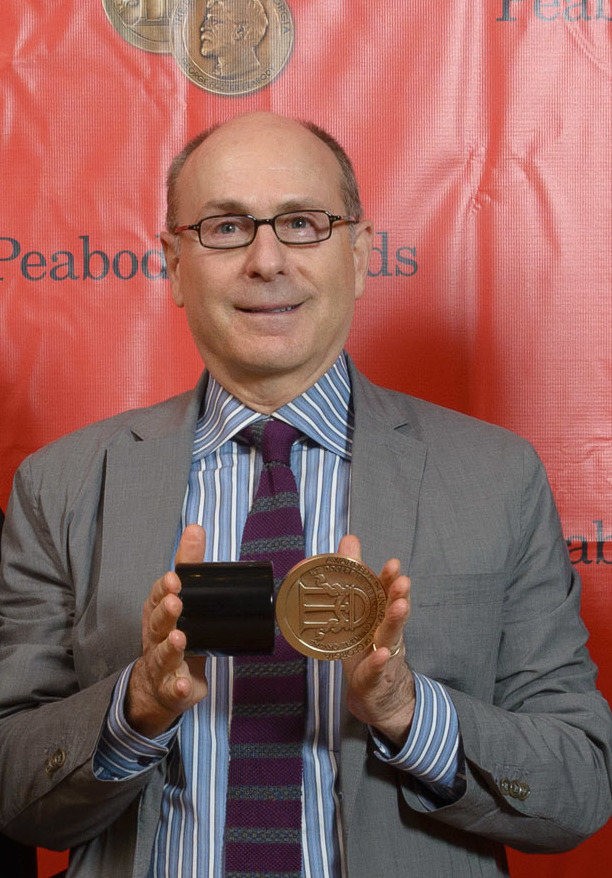
Rob Marshall directed and co-produced the film, while James Lapine adapted his own stage libretto for the screen.

After the critical and commercial success of Chicago in 2002, director Rob Marshall approached Sondheim with a proposal to adapt one of his musicals. Marshall was initially interested in adapting Follies and Sweeney Todd: The Demon Barber of Fleet Street, Sondheim suggested Into the Woods instead. Marshall concurred, but the project was postponed while he focused on directing Memoirs of a Geisha and Nine. In 2011, Marshall's interest in the project was rekindled when he heard a speech by President Barack Obama on the tenth anniversary of the September 11, 2001, attacks to the families of the victims, which seemed to evoke the same message as the musical's most important song, "No One Is Alone". Marshall firmly believed that Into the Woods was "a fairy-tale for the post-9/11 generation". In January 2012, he approached Walt Disney Pictures—for which he had just directed Pirates of the Caribbean: On Stranger Tides—and pitched the idea to the studio, with Lapine writing the script and Sondheim "expected" to write new songs. Academy Award–winner Dion Beebe, who previously collaborated with Marshall on Chicago, Memoirs of a Geisha, and Nine, served as cinematographer. Sondheim confirmed that a new song had been written for the film in an April 2013 interview with The Independent.

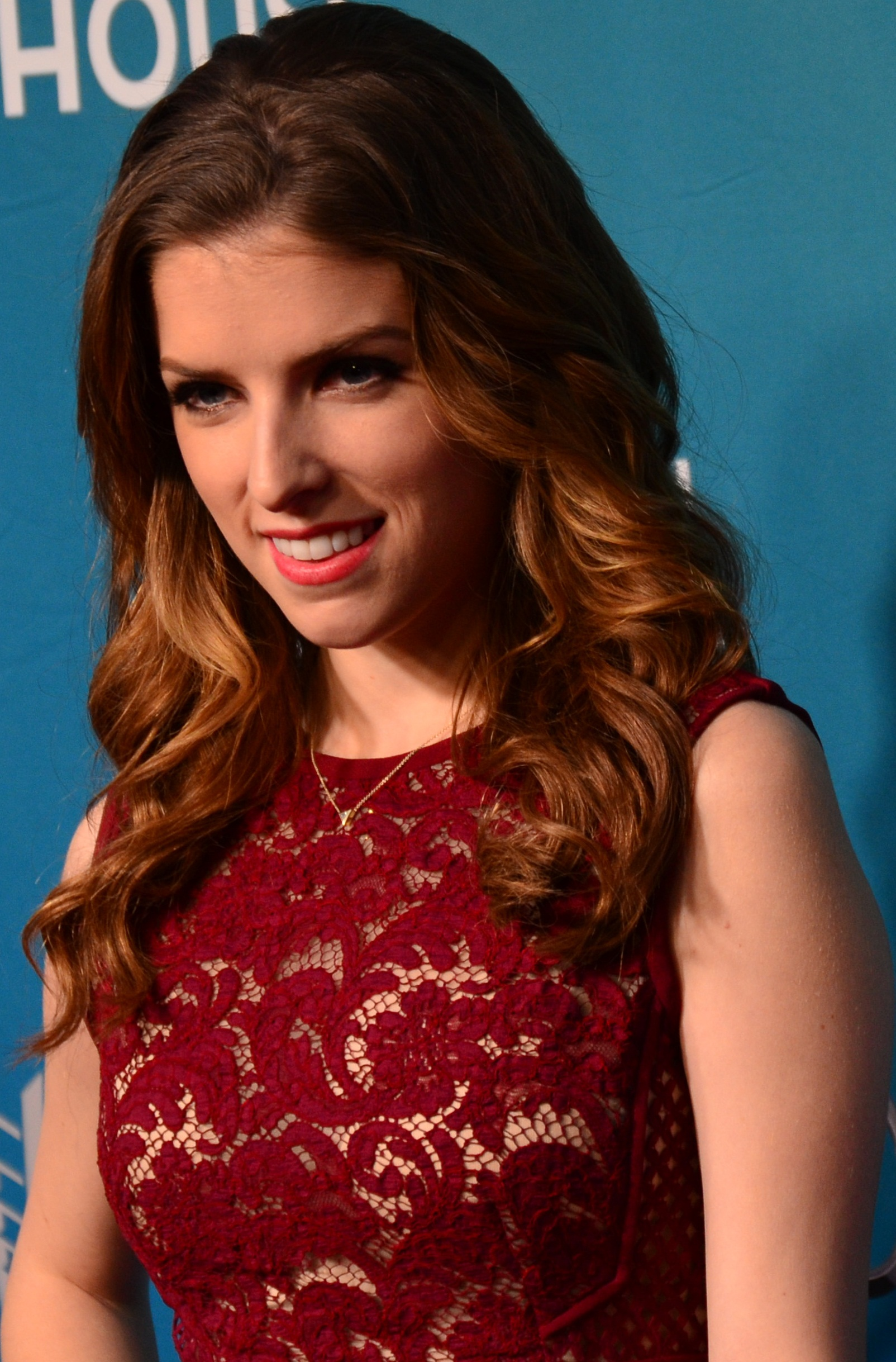
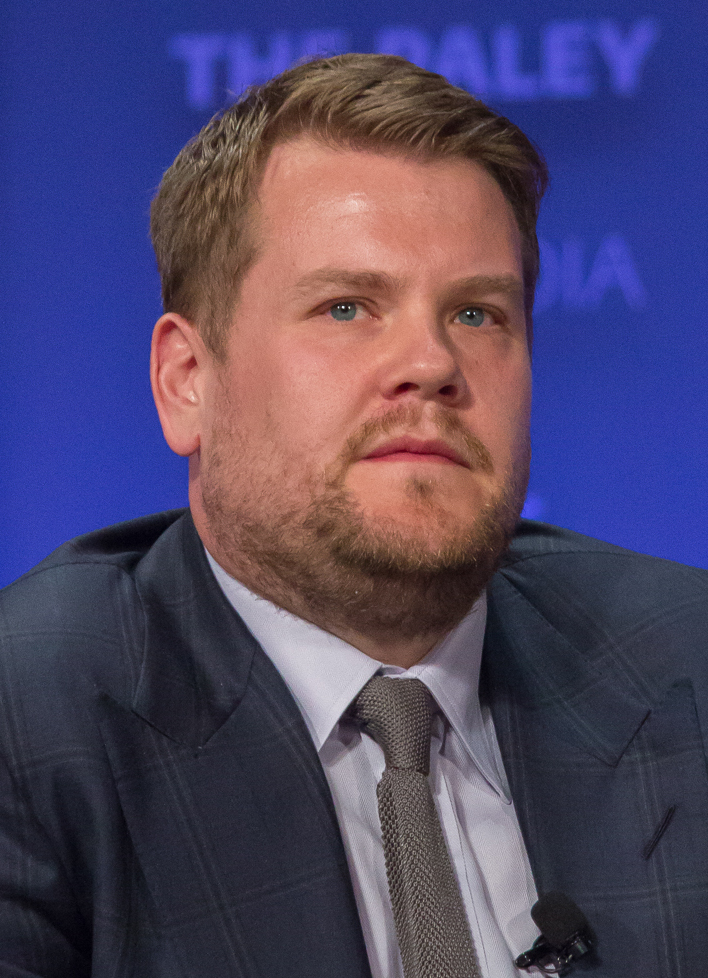
Actors Anna Kendrick and James Corden participated in an October 2012 reading of the screenplay that would convince Disney to greenlight the film. They would reprise their roles as Cinderella and The Baker for the film.

With Disney's backing, a three-day reading of the entire updated screenplay took place in New York in October 2012 under Marshall's direction, with Nina Arianda as the Baker's Wife, Victoria Clark as Cinderella's Mother/Granny/Giant, James Corden as the Baker, Donna Murphy as the Witch, Christine Baranski as Cinderella's Stepmother, Tammy Blanchard as Florinda, Ivan Hernandez as the Wolf, Megan Hilty as Lucinda, Cheyenne Jackson as Rapunzel's Prince, Allison Janney as Jack's Mother, Anna Kendrick as Cinderella, Michael McGrath as Steward/Mysterious Man, Laura Osnes as Rapunzel, Taylor Trensch as Jack, Casey Whyland as Little Red Riding Hood, and Patrick Wilson as Cinderella's Prince. This reading convinced Walt Disney Studios president Sean Bailey to green-light the film despite ongoing concerns about the original musical's dark nature (which Disney executives had begun to understand since Marshall's original pitch). Disney (which self-finances all its films) provided only a relatively small production budget of $50 million (relative to other feature-length fantasy films on its development slate), in turn forcing both cast and crew to accept pay cuts to work on the film.

Reports surfaced in January 2013 that Meryl Streep had been cast as the Witch. Streep had instituted a personal "no witch" rule after she turned 40 and was offered three witch roles, but ultimately broke the rule to do a Sondheim role again; she had been in the original production of Sondheim's The Frogs as a student at Yale University. During the same month, it was reported that Janney had been confirmed to join the film, but five months later, Tracey Ullman was cast as Jack's Mother instead.

In April 2013, Johnny Depp was in final negotiations to join the film. The Hollywood Reporter reported that to help make the film on such a tight budget, Depp agreed as a favor to Disney and to Marshall to a "boarding" arrangement, in which he would appear in a minor role for a fee of $1 million, instead of his typical fee of $20 million for a starring role. In May, Corden, who took part in the reading of the screenplay, was in talks to play the role of the Baker. On May 10, 2013, Disney confirmed the casting of Streep, Depp, and Corden as the Witch, the Big Bad Wolf, and the Baker, respectively. That same month, Emily Blunt and Christine Baranski were cast, respectively, as the Baker's Wife and Cinderella's Stepmother. Marshall later confirmed that Blunt was selected for her "warm[th]" and likeability to ensure the emotional impact of the sudden death of the Baker's Wife: "[T]hat's very important for that character because it's the heart of the piece and you really have to love her so when she's gone it should feel like a kick in the gut." After she was cast, Blunt discovered she was pregnant; her costume and choreography had to be adjusted accordingly. Her appearance during production seemed to befit the Baker's Wife; as she explained, "I feel like she would have eaten a lot of carbs working in the bakery."

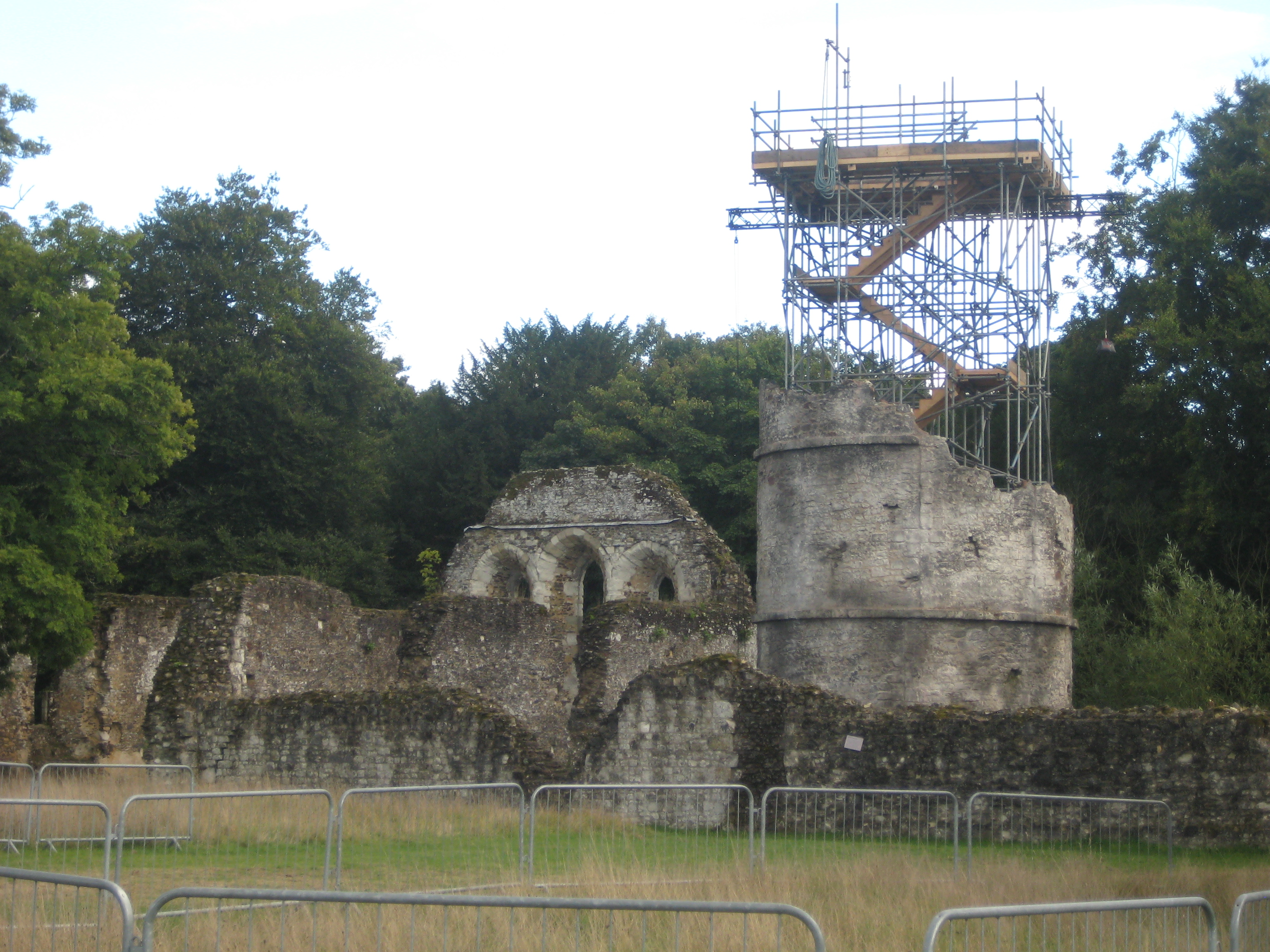
Rapunzel's tower under construction at Waverley Abbey in Farnham, Surrey.

Also in May, Jake Gyllenhaal and Chris Pine entered negotiations to play the Princes. Gyllenhaal dropped out due to scheduling conflicts with another film, Nightcrawler, and was replaced by Billy Magnussen. One month later, Anna Kendrick began talks to play Cinderella. In June 2013, Walt Disney Studios publicly announced that the film had been greenlighted, and scheduled a release date for Christmas Day 2014. In July, MacKenzie Mauzy, Tammy Blanchard, Lucy Punch and Daniel Huttlestone joined the cast. Mauzy later said she had auditioned for Cinderella but did not get the part. Marshall saw her audition tape and brought her back in for Rapunzel, after recognizing "the 'vulnerability' and 'emotion' Mauzy could bring to Rapunzel after she read just one line", as he recalled. In early August, Sophia Grace Brownlee's representatives announced that she had been cast as Little Red Riding Hood. The announcement of Brownlee's casting, which was widely reported but never confirmed by Disney, was criticized as "a stunt" and was met with concern due to her age and the sexual undertones between Little Red and the Wolf. The film's synopsis and the official casting of Streep, Depp, Kendrick, Pine, and Blunt were revealed at the D23 Expo on August 10, 2013. On September 16, 2013, Lilla Crawford was confirmed as playing the character of Little Red Riding Hood, despite previous reports suggesting Brownlee. Crawford auditioned for Marshall via Skype, who offered her the role within two hours. Crawford was on a flight to London the next day as a result. Later on, Dominic Brownlee spoke about the withdrawal of his daughter Sophia Grace from the movie: "After careful consideration, we, the parents of Sophia Grace, felt that as rehearsals progressed that she was too young for this part. It was a joint decision between us and the director and producer of Into the Woods to withdraw Sophia Grace from the film." The casting of Richard Glover, Frances de la Tour, Simon Russell Beale, Joanna Riding, and Annette Crosbie in other roles was separately announced later on September 16.

=== Filming ===
In July 2013, before filming began, Marshall put the cast through six weeks of rehearsal on a soundstage and blocked their scenes. In August, the cast visited Angel Recording Studios to record their parts in Sondheim's presence. Over 90% of the vocal tracks in the film are from the recording studio sessions; the rest were recorded on location or on set. The advantage of blocking and rehearsing all scenes first was that the cast members could then precisely calibrate their voices in the recording studio to the planned appearance of each scene when it was filmed, thereby minimizing the disconnection between vocals and choreography typical of music videos.

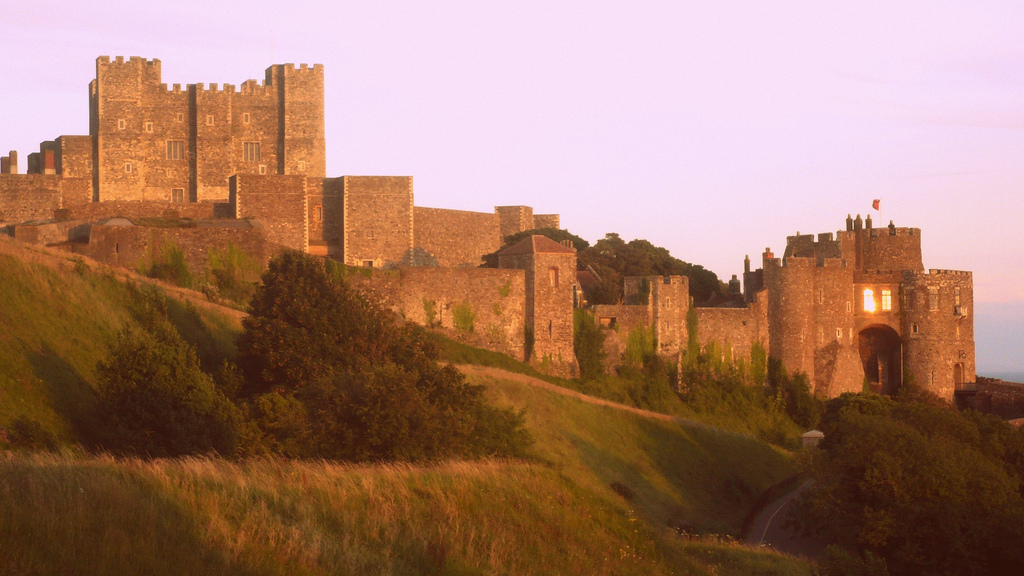
Dover Castle in Kent was used as the exterior for the Prince's castle.

Principal photography took place at London's Shepperton Studios in September 2013, with additional filming at Dover Castle, Hambleden, Waverley Abbey, and Richmond Park. A forest of ancient pine trees in Windsor Great Park was used for many of the scenes in the woods. Marshall struggled with how to stage the melodramatic duet "Agony" in the forest until discovering online that Windsor had an artificial waterfall at Virginia Water Lake, which turned out to be the perfect setting. The production was shot digitally, using Arri Alexa cameras configured in a two-camera setup, and footage was edited together in Avid Media Composer. The exterior of Byfleet Manor in Surrey served as Cinderella's home.

The filmmakers spent a whole day shooting scenes involving Rapunzel's hair being climbed. Mauzy said the filmmakers wanted to take advantage of her blonde hair, and that the top of Rapunzel's hair was her real hair; makeup artists only braided it into the extension. This hair extension was engineered by hair designer Peter King. After testing loose, flowing hair that King found "uncontrollable", he decided to have 27 wefts of real hair woven into a 30-foot braid, a design inspired by an Arthur Rackham illustration of Rapunzel. To bring in enough real Russian hair strands for the extension, King and his team worked with several distributors from Germany and England. The hair-braiding process required three people, each holding a separate strand and weaving in and out. King also dyed the wefts to match Mauzy's hair color, and blended together six different shades from ash and strawberry to create realistic gradations and highlights. Between scenes, Mauzy had to "wrap [the hair] around her arm like huge rolls of wool", King recalled. A stuntman was used to shoot the hair-climbing scenes, with thin rope and metal rings the only tools concealed in the braid to hold a climbing person's weight.

The film's final shot, which essentially merges into and links back to its first shot, actually transitions digitally between three shots: a Technocrane on location lifting as high as possible into the sky, an aerial drone flying down a valley in Wales, and a shot of an overcast sky in Manhattan, New York City. Filming concluded on November 27, 2013.

On July 14, 2014, Steve Baldwin posted on a social networking site that reshoots were made during all of July. The next month, however, Marshall denied the film went through reshoots. Instead, they spent three days shooting new material that had been cut and readded to the script after Disney screened the movie. For his role as the Wolf, Depp worked closely with the film's costume designer, Colleen Atwood, to create a Tex Avery-inspired costume, complete with zoot suit and fedora.

=== Music ===
As noted above, the majority of the songs were pre-recorded by the cast. Music producer Mike Higham, who had worked with Sondheim on Sweeney Todd: The Demon Barber of Fleet Street, recorded the film's score with the London Symphony Orchestra and London Philharmonic. Music supervisor and conductor Paul Gemignani instructed the actors how to sing, including singing live to a camera on set, to prerecorded music in studio, and with a live studio orchestra. Jonathan Tunick reorchestrated Sondheim's music. The key of the song, "Hello, Little Girl," was altered to suit Depp's lower vocal range. Of the song's musical arrangement, Higham said, "we emphasized the woodwinds to make it feel a little lighter, especially the flutes. And we just made it a little jazzier — played more on the walking bass line. Inherently, when it has a jazz feel, it just feels lighter." The soundtrack was released by Walt Disney Records on December 15, 2014.

It was initially reported that the film would feature two new songs: a duet for the Baker and his Wife, "Rainbows"—originally written for a 1992 film adaptation that was never made—and a new song for the Witch, "She'll Be Back". But neither song appears in the film: "Rainbows" was cut before shooting began and "She'll Be Back", though filmed, was cut on the grounds that it slowed the story down. "She'll Be Back" was included as a bonus feature on the film's home media release.

== Release ==
The first official company presentation took place at the 2013 Disney D23 expo. The official teaser trailer debuted on July 31, 2014. A featurette was released showing behind-the-scenes clips and the vocals of Streep, Kendrick, Blunt and others. A second trailer was released on November 6, 2014.

The film held its world premiere at the Ziegfeld Theatre in New York City on December 8, 2014. It was released theatrically in the United States on December 25, 2014.

=== Home media ===
Walt Disney Studios Home Entertainment released the film on Blu-ray, DVD, and digital download in North America on March 24, 2015. The film debuted in second place on the home media charts behind The Hobbit: The Battle of the Five Armies. The home media version includes Sondheim and Lapine's original song "She'll Be Back". A sing-along version of the film was released on Disney+ on October 14, 2022.

== Reception ==
=== Box office ===
Into the Woods grossed $128 million in North America and $84.9 million in other territories, for a worldwide total of $212.9 million, against a budget of $50 million.

Into the Woods opened across North America on December 24, 2014, and earned $1.1 million from late-night Christmas Eve showings and $15.08 million on opening day (including previews) from 2,440 theaters. Its opening-day gross was the fourth-biggest Christmas Day debut and the sixth-biggest Christmas Day gross ever. The film was one of four films put into wide release on December 25, 2014, the other three being Universal Pictures' Unbroken (3,131 theaters), Paramount Pictures' The Gambler (2,478 theaters), and TWC's Big Eyes (1,307 theaters). It earned $31.1 million in its traditional three-day opening ($46.1 million including its Christmas Day gross), debuting at #2 at the box office behind The Hobbit: The Battle of the Five Armies and achieving the highest opening weekend for a film based on a Broadway musical (previously held by Mamma Mia!). It would hold this record until 2024 with the release of Universal's Wicked, the first film of that musical's two-part film adaptation. The film's $3.5 million debut in Japan marked the largest opening for a 21st-century live-action musical film.

=== Critical response ===
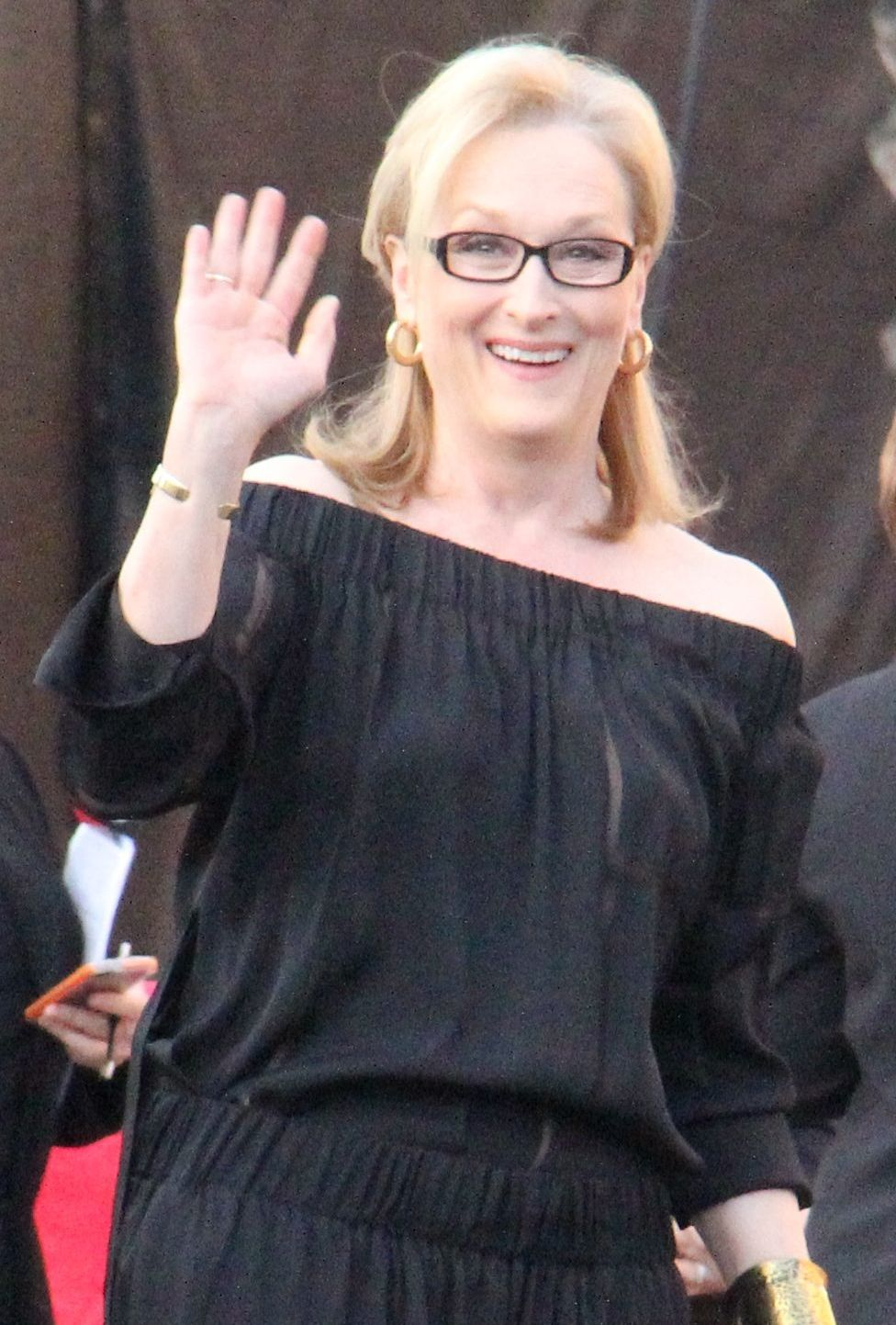
Meryl Streep's performance as The Witch garnered critical acclaim and she received an Academy Award nomination for Best Supporting Actress.

The review aggregation website Rotten Tomatoes reports an approval rating of 71% based on 221 reviews with an average rating of 6.7/10. The site's consensus reads: "On the whole, this Disney adaptation of the Sondheim classic sits comfortably at the corner of Hollywood and Broadway—even if it darkens to its detriment in the final act." Another review aggregator, Metacritic, calculated a weighted average score of 69 out of 100, based on 41 critics, indicating "generally favorable" reviews. In CinemaScore polls conducted during the opening weekend, audiences gave the film an average grade of "B" on an A+ to F scale.

Streep was immensely applauded for her performance as the Witch, with many critics and audiences believing she was the film's heart. Susan Wloszczyna for RogerEbert.com praised Streep's performances of the songs "Stay with Me" and "Last Midnight", and summed her performance up as leaving "practically everyone else in the dust and by design."

The Hollywood Reporter wrote that the film "benefits from respect for the source material, enticing production values and a populous gallery of sharp character portraits from a delightful cast". Stephen Holden of The New York Times lauded the film, writing; "Into the Woods, the splendid Disney screen adaptation of the Stephen Sondheim-James Lapine musical, infuses new vitality into the tired marketing concept of entertainment for 'children of all ages'". Leonard Maltin called the movie "one of the year's best films". Similarly, Pete Hammond of Deadline praised the film as "the most dazzling movie musical since Marshall's own Chicago." and praised the performance of the cast, particularly Streep. Lou Lumerick of the New York Post called the film "this century's best musical" and lauded the performances of Streep and Blunt as the best female performances of the year. Scott Mendelson of Forbes gave a positive review declaring the film "Rob Marshall's best movie ever" and praised it for its genuine entertainment and strong cast performances. Richard Corliss of Time gave a positive review, stating that the film was a "smart, appealing, upside-down children's story for adults of all ages". Gregory Ellwood of HitFix tapped Streep as an Academy Award contender in the Best Supporting Actress category, and also praised the performance of Chris Pine.

Richard Lawson of Vanity Fair, Karen D'Souza of the San Jose Mercury News, and Dana Stevens of Slate all published critical reviews of the film. All three found much to like in the acting (especially Blunt and Pine's performances), but also concluded that after the various cuts and changes, the film had failed to adequately preserve the power of the dark existentialist message at the heart of the original musical's second act. Stevens characterized the result as a "generic dystopian bummer," while Lawson criticized the film as a "dutiful but perfunctory adaptation" that lacked "genuine heart". Paul Katz of The Huffington Post felt the change in tone between the last two acts was too abrupt, and also criticized the film's faithfulness to the stage musical. Conversely, Alyssa Rosenberg of The Washington Post disliked the performances by Streep and Depp, while simultaneously calling the film's first two acts a "surprising delight".

In February 2025, The Washington Post ranked the film at number 9 on its list of "The 25 best movie musicals of the 21st century," with Naveen Kumar writing "Stephen Sondheim and James Lapine’s 1986 musical is the Justice League of Brothers Grimm fairy tales and a natural fit for the big screen. The Disney film from director Rob Marshall lends the story a lush grandiosity while staying rooted in cleverly drawn takes on familiar characters."

=== Accolades ===
List of awards and nominations
| Award | Date of ceremony | Category | Recipient(s) | Result |
|---|---|---|---|---|
| Academy Awards | February 22, 2015 | Best Supporting Actress | Meryl Streep | Nominated |
| Academy Awards | February 22, 2015 | Best Costume Design | Colleen Atwood | Nominated |
| Academy Awards | February 22, 2015 | Best Production Design | Production Design: Dennis Gassner; Set Decoration: Anna Pinnock | Nominated |
| AACTA International Awards | January 31, 2015 | Best Supporting Actress | Meryl Streep | Nominated |
| Art Directors Guild Awards | January 31, 2015 | Excellence in Production Design for a Fantasy Film | Dennis Gassner | Nominated |
| American Cinema Editors | January 30, 2015 | Best Edited Feature Film – Comedy or Musical | Wyatt Smith | Nominated |
| American Film Institute | December 9, 2014 | Top Eleven Films of the Year | Into the Woods | Won |
| Billboard Music Awards | May 17, 2015 | Top Soundtrack | Into the Woods | Nominated |
| British Academy Film Awards | February 8, 2015 | Best Costume Design | Colleen Atwood | Nominated |
| British Academy Film Awards | February 8, 2015 | Best Makeup and Hair | Peter Swords King, J. Roy Helland | Nominated |
| Broadcast Film Critics Association | January 15, 2015 | Best Supporting Actress | Meryl Streep | Nominated |
| Broadcast Film Critics Association | January 15, 2015 | Best Acting Ensemble | The Cast of Into the Woods | Nominated |
| Broadcast Film Critics Association | January 15, 2015 | Best Art Direction | Dennis Gassner/Production Designer, Anna Pinnock/Set Decorator | Nominated |
| Broadcast Film Critics Association | January 15, 2015 | Best Costume Design | Colleen Atwood | Nominated |
| Broadcast Film Critics Association | January 15, 2015 | Best Hair & Makeup | | Nominated |
| Casting Society of America | January 22, 2015 | Big Budget Comedy | Francine Maisler, Bernard Telsey, Tiffany Little Canfield | Nominated |
| Chicago Film Critics Association | December 15, 2014 | Best Art direction/Production Design | Dennis Gassner, Anna Pinnock | Nominated |
| Costume Designers Guild | February 17, 2015 | Excellence in Fantasy Film | Colleen Atwood | Won |
| Detroit Film Critics Society | December 15, 2014 | Best Ensemble | The Cast of Into the Woods | Nominated |
| Empire Awards | March 29, 2015 | Best Male Newcomer | Daniel Huttlestone | Nominated |
| Florida Film Critics Circle | December 19, 2014 | Best Art Direction/Production Design | Dennis Gassner, Anna Pinnock | Nominated |
| Golden Globe Awards | January 11, 2015 | Best Motion Picture – Musical or Comedy | Into the Woods | Nominated |
| Golden Globe Awards | January 11, 2015 | Best Actress in a Motion Picture – Comedy or Musical | Emily Blunt | Nominated |
| Golden Globe Awards | January 11, 2015 | Best Supporting Actress – Motion Picture | Meryl Streep | Nominated |
| Kids' Choice Awards | March 28, 2015 | Best Villain | Meryl Streep | Nominated |
| MPSE Golden Reel Awards | February 15, 2015 | Feature Musical | Mike Higham, Jennifer Dunnington | Nominated |
| MTV Movie Awards | April 12, 2015 | Best Villain | Meryl Streep | Won |
| San Diego Film Critics Society | December 15, 2014 | Best Production Design | Dennis Gassner, Anna Pinnock | Nominated |
| Satellite Awards | February 15, 2015 | Best Ensemble – Motion Picture | Meryl Streep, Emily Blunt, James Corden, Anna Kendrick, Chris Pine, Johnny Depp, Lilla Crawford, Daniel Huttlestone, MacKenzie Mauzy, Tracey Ullman, Christine Baranski, Tammy Blanchard, Lucy Punch, Billy Magnussen, and Frances de la Tour | Won |
| Satellite Awards | February 15, 2015 | Best Costume Design | Colleen Atwood | Nominated |
| Satellite Awards | February 15, 2015 | Best Sound (Editing and Mixing) | Blake Leyh, John Casali, Michael Keller, Michael Prestwoood Smith, and Renee Tondelli | Nominated |
| Satellite Awards | February 15, 2015 | Best Visual Effects | Christian Irles, Matt Johnson, and Stefano Pepin | Nominated |
| Saturn Awards | June 25, 2015 | Best Fantasy Film | Into the Woods | Nominated |
| Saturn Awards | June 25, 2015 | Best Supporting Actress | Meryl Streep | Nominated |
| Saturn Awards | June 25, 2015 | Best Production Design | Dennis Gassner | Nominated |
| Saturn Awards | June 25, 2015 | Best Costume | Colleen Atwood | Nominated |
| Saturn Awards | June 25, 2015 | Best Make-up | Peter King and Matthew Smith | Nominated |
| Screen Actors Guild Awards | January 25, 2015 | Outstanding Performance by a Female Actor in a Supporting Role | Meryl Streep | Nominated |
| St. Louis Film Critics | December 15, 2014 | Best Music Soundtrack | | Nominated |
| Washington D.C. Area Film Critics Association Awards | December 8, 2014 | Best Ensemble | The Cast of Into the Woods | Nominated |
| Washington D.C. Area Film Critics Association Awards | December 8, 2014 | Best Art Direction | Dennis Gassner and Anna Pinnock | Nominated |
| Young Artist Awards | May 15, 2015 | Best Performance in a Feature Film – Supporting Young Actor | Daniel Huttlestone | Nominated |
| Young Artist Awards | May 15, 2015 | Best Performance in a Feature Film – Supporting Young Actress | Lilla Crawford | Won |
