= John DeLuca (producer) =

American film producer and choreographer

- Born: Orange, New Jersey, U.S.
- Occupations: Film producer and choreographer
- Spouse: Rob Marshall (m. 2012)

John DeLuca is an American film producer and choreographer from Orange, New Jersey. He most frequently works with his partner, director Rob Marshall. They met as Off-Broadway performers.

== Career ==
For his choreography on Mary Poppins Returns, DeLuca, with Rob Marshall, won the 2019 Chita Rivera Award for theatrical release.

== Personal life ==
DeLuca is gay. As of at least 2007, DeLuca lives in New York City with his husband, director, producer and choreographer Rob Marshall, whom he married in 2012. In 2004, they bought a $4.2 million summer home in Sagaponack, New York, part of The Hamptons.

== Filmography ==
- Memoirs of a Geisha (2005, co-producer)
- Tony Bennett: An American Classic (2006, executive)
- Nine (2009)
- Pirates of the Caribbean: On Stranger Tides (2011, executive)
- Into the Woods (2014)
- Mary Poppins Returns (2018)
- The Little Mermaid (2023)
