= Rob Marshall =

American film and theatre director and producer (born 1960)

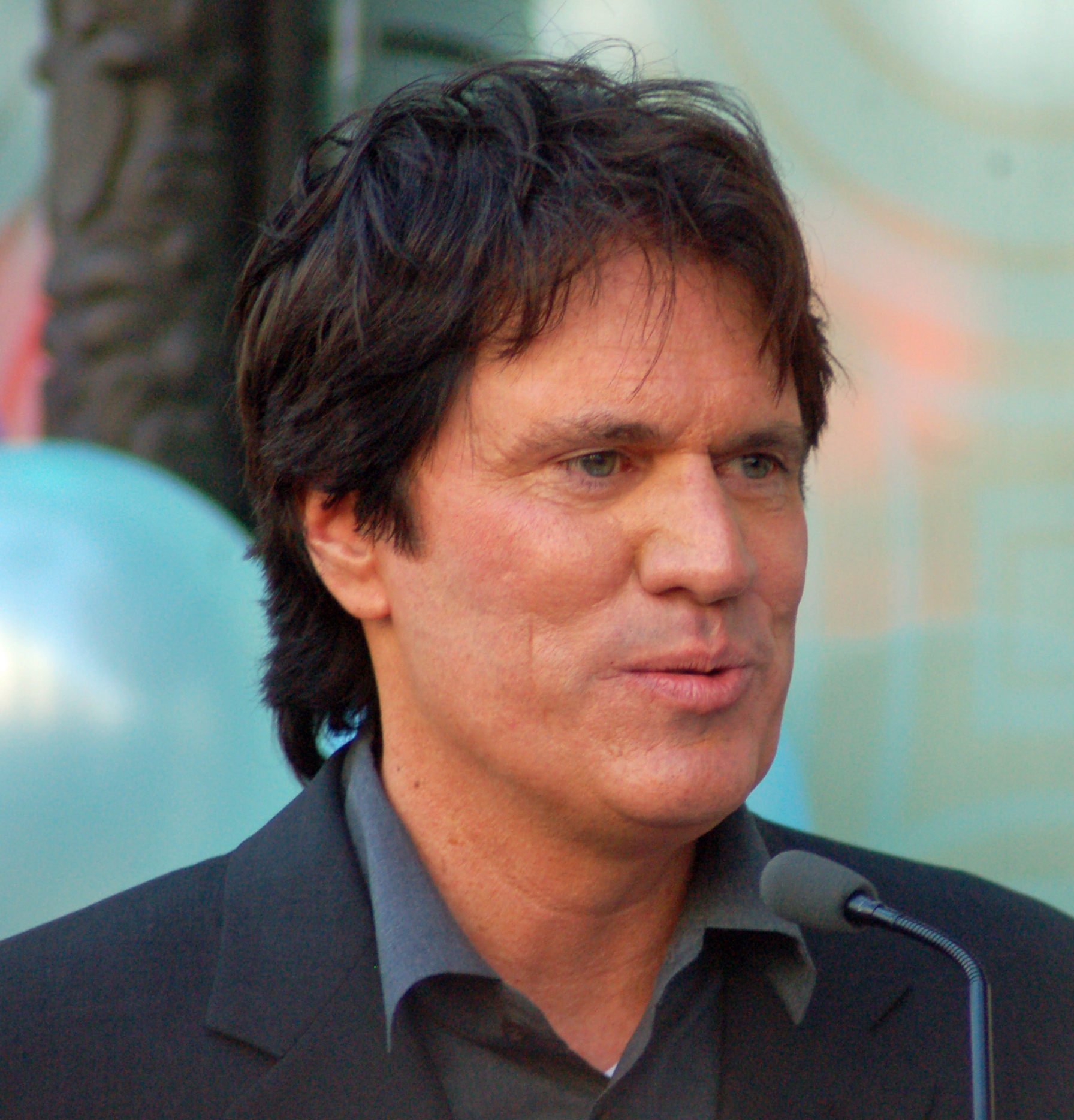
- Marshall in April 2011
- Born: Robert Doyle Marshall Jr. October 17, 1960 (age 66); Madison, Wisconsin, U.S.
- Education: Carnegie Mellon University (BFA)
- Occupations: Film director; film producer; theater director; choreographer
- Spouse: John DeLuca (m. 2012)
- Relatives: Kathleen Marshall (sister)
- Awards: Directors Guild of America Award for Outstanding Directing – Feature Film; Chicago (2002)

Robert Doyle Marshall Jr. (born October 17, 1960) is an American film and theater director, producer, and choreographer. He is best known for directing the film version of the Broadway musical Chicago, which was based on the play of the same name by playwright Maurine Dallas Watkins. His work on the film earned him the Directors Guild of America Award for Outstanding Directing – Feature Film, as well as nominations for the Academy Award for Best Director, the Golden Globe Award for Best Director, and the BAFTA Award for Best Direction. He also directed the films Memoirs of a Geisha, Nine, Pirates of the Caribbean: On Stranger Tides, Into the Woods, Mary Poppins Returns, and The Little Mermaid.

== Early life and education ==
Robert Doyle Marshall Jr. was born in Madison, Wisconsin. His father and namesake, Robert Doyle Marshall Sr., was a Ph.D. student at the University of Wisconsin–Madison, and his mother Anne was a teacher. Like him, his younger sister Kathleen became a choreographer and director.

In 1964, Robert Marshall joined the English department at the University of Pittsburgh, and the Marshall family relocated to Pittsburgh. Anne would later work for Pittsburgh Public Schools and the University of Pittsburgh School of Education, and Robert would become associate professor of English and dean of the College of Arts and Sciences at the same university.

Rob Marshall graduated from the Falk School, and then in 1978 from Taylor Allderdice High School, into whose alumni hall of fame he later was inducted. Graduating from Carnegie Mellon University in 1982, Marshall worked in the Pittsburgh theatre scene, performing with such companies as Pittsburgh Civic Light Opera.

== Career ==
Marshall went on to perform as a dancer in various Broadway shows, but suffered a herniated disc while performing in Cats and after recovering, transitioned into choreography and then directing.

He debuted as a director in the film industry with the TV adaptation of the musical Annie by Charles Strouse and Martin Charnin. He went on to direct the 2002 adaptation of the Kander and Ebb musical Chicago, for which he was nominated for an Academy Award for Best Director. His next feature film was the drama Memoirs of a Geisha based on the best-selling book of the same name by Arthur Golden starring Zhang Ziyi, Gong Li, Michelle Yeoh and Ken Watanabe. The film went on to win three Academy Awards and gross $162.2 million at the worldwide box office.

Marshall went on to direct the 2009 film Nine, an adaptation of the Broadway production with the same name starring Daniel Day-Lewis, Marion Cotillard, Nicole Kidman, Sophia Loren and Penélope Cruz, who was nominated for an Academy Award for Best Supporting Actress. In August 2009, it was reported that Marshall was to direct Pirates of the Caribbean: On Stranger Tides, the fourth chapter of Disney's Pirates of the Caribbean film series starring Johnny Depp, Penélope Cruz, Ian McShane and Geoffrey Rush, which opened on May 20, 2011 and grossed $1 billion worldwide.

After working with Disney on Pirates, Marshall directed Disney's film adaptation of Stephen Sondheim's Into the Woods (2014), and produced the film under his Lucamar Productions banner. His next film was the sequel to the 1964 film Mary Poppins, titled Mary Poppins Returns, reuniting two Into the Woods actresses: Emily Blunt as the title character and Meryl Streep in a supporting role.

By December 2017, Disney was considering Marshall to direct the live-action/CGI adaptation of The Little Mermaid, which he was officially confirmed to direct in December 2018. In 2024, Marshall was hired to take over for Bill Condon as director of the remake of Guys and Dolls, for which he will also co-produce and co-write the screenplay with John DeLuca, John Requa and Glenn Ficarra.

== Personal life ==
Marshall is gay. As of at least 2007, Marshall lives in New York City with his husband, producer and choreographer John DeLuca, whom he married in 2012. In 2004, they bought a $4.2 million summer home in Sagaponack, New York, part of The Hamptons.

== Works ==
=== Theater ===
Year	Title	Credit	Venue
1983	Zorba	Actor	Broadway Theatre, Broadway
1984	The Rink	Dance captain, Actor	Martin Beck Theatre, Broadway
1985	The Mystery of Edwin Drood	Dance captain, Actor, Assistant to the choreographer	Imperial Theatre, Broadway
1987	Blithe Spirit	Movement consultant	Neil Simon Theatre, Broadway
1993	Kiss of the Spider Woman	Additional choreography	Broadhurst Theatre, Broadway
1993	She Loves Me	Musical staging	Criterion Center Stage Right, Broadway
1994	Damn Yankees	Choreographer	Marquis Theatre, Broadway
1995	Company	Musical staging	Criterion Center Stage Right, Broadway
1995	Victor/Victoria	Choreographer	Marquis Theatre, Broadway
1996	A Funny Thing Happened on the Way to the Forum	Choreographer	St. James Theatre, Broadway
1997	The Petrified Prince	Musical staging	The Public Theater, Off-Broadway
1998	Cabaret	Co-director, Choreographer	Kit Kat Club, Broadway
1998	Little Me	Director, Choreographer	Criterion Center Stage Right, Broadway
2000	Seussical	Director (uncredited)	Richard Rodgers Theatre, Broadway
2014	Cabaret	Co-director, Choreographer	Studio 54, Broadway

=== Film ===
Year	Title	Director	Producer	Choreographer	Story writer	Notes
2002	Chicago	Yes	No	Yes	No	Feature directorial debut
2005	Memoirs of a Geisha	Yes	No	No	No	
2009	Nine	Yes	Yes	Yes	No	
2011	Pirates of the Caribbean: On Stranger Tides	Yes	No	No	No	
2014	Into the Woods	Yes	Yes	Yes	No	Also musical stager
2014	Chicago in the Spotlight: A Retrospective with the Cast and Crew	Yes	No	No	No	Making-of documentary
2018	Mary Poppins Returns	Yes	Yes	Yes	Yes	
2023	The Little Mermaid	Yes	Yes	No	No	

=== Television ===
Year	Title	Director	Choreographer	Notes
2001	The Kennedy Center Honors: A Celebration of the Performing Arts	Yes	No	TV event
2013	85th Academy Awards	No	Yes	TV special; Segment "All that Jazz" from Chicago

TV movies

Year	Title	Director	Executive; Producer	Choreographer	Notes
1995	Victor/Victoria	No	No	Yes	
1996	Mrs. Santa Claus	No	No	Yes	
1997	Rodgers and Hammerstein's Cinderella	No	No	Yes	Also musical stager
1999	Annie	Yes	No	Yes	
2006	Tony Bennett: An American Classic	Yes	Yes	Yes	

== Awards and nominations ==
=== Theater ===
Year	Work	Award	Category	Result
1993	Kiss of the Spider Woman	Tony Awards	Best Choreography	Nominated
1994	Damn Yankees	Tony Awards	Best Choreography	Nominated
1994	Damn Yankees	Outer Critics Circle Award	Outstanding Choreography (also for She Loves Me)	Won
1994	She Loves Me	Tony Awards	Best Choreography	Nominated
1994	She Loves Me	Drama Desk Award	Outstanding Choreography	Nominated
1994	She Loves Me	Outer Critics Circle Award	Outstanding Choreography (also for Damn Yankees)	Won
1998	Cabaret	Tony Awards	Best Direction of a Musical	Nominated
1998	Cabaret	Tony Awards	Best Choreography	Nominated
1998	Cabaret	Drama Desk Award	Outstanding Director of a Musical	Nominated
1998	Cabaret	Drama Desk Award	Outstanding Choreography	Nominated
1998	Cabaret	Outer Critics Circle Award	Outstanding Director of a Musical	Nominated
1998	Cabaret	Outer Critics Circle Award	Outstanding Choreography	Nominated
1999	Little Me	Tony Awards	Best Choreography	Nominated
1999	Little Me	Drama Desk Award	Outstanding Choreography	Nominated
1999	Little Me	Outer Critics Circle Award	Outstanding Choreography	Nominated
2014	Cabaret	Astaire Awards	Outstanding Choreographer in a Broadway Show	Nominated

=== Film and television ===
Year	Title	Award/nomination
1996	Mrs. Santa Claus	Nominated — Emmy Award for Outstanding Choreography
1997	Rodgers and Hammerstein's Cinderella	Nominated — Emmy Award for Outstanding Choreography
1999	Annie	Emmy Award for Outstanding Choreography; Nominated — Emmy Award for Outstanding Directing for a TV Movie
2001	The Kennedy Center Honors: A Celebration of the Performing Arts	Directors Guild of America Award for Outstanding Directorial Achievement in Musical/Variety
2002	Chicago	Directors Guild of America Award for Outstanding Directing; Nominated — Academy Award for Best Director; Nominated — Golden Globe Award for Best Director; Nominated — BAFTA Award for Best Direction; Nominated — David di Donatello for Best Foreign Film; Nominated — Online Film Critics Award for Best Breakthrough
2005	Memoirs of a Geisha	Nominated — Satellite Award for Best Director
2006	Tony Bennett: An American Classic	Emmy Award for Outstanding Variety Special, Emmy Award for Outstanding Directing for a Variety, Music or Comedy Program; Emmy Award for Outstanding Choreography
2009	Nine	Nominated — Satellite Award for Best Director
2019	Mary Poppins Returns	Chita Rivera Awards for Outstanding Choreography of a Theatrical Release

Awards and nominations received by Marshall's films
Year	Title	Academy Awards		BAFTA Awards		Golden Globe Awards	
Year	Title	Nominations	Wins	Nominations	Wins	Nominations	Wins
2002	Chicago	13	6	12	2	8	3
2005	Memoirs of a Geisha	6	3	6	3	2	1
2009	Nine	4		1		5	
2014	Into the Woods	3		2		3	
2018	Mary Poppins Returns	4		3		4	
Total		30	9	24	5	18	4

Directed Academy Award performances
Under Marshall's direction, these actors have received Academy Award nominations (and one win) for their performances in their respective roles.

Year	Performer	Film	Result
Academy Award for Best Actress
2002	Renée Zellweger	Chicago	Nominated
Academy Award for Best Supporting Actor
2002	John C. Reilly	Chicago	Nominated
Academy Award for Best Supporting Actress
2002	Queen Latifah	Chicago	Nominated
2002	Catherine Zeta-Jones	Chicago	Won
2009	Penélope Cruz	Nine	Nominated
2014	Meryl Streep	Into the Woods	Nominated

== See also ==
- LGBTQ culture in New York City
- List of LGBTQ people in New York City
