= Robert Westenberg =

American actor

- Born: October 26, 1953 (age 72); Miami Beach, Florida
- Other name: Bob Westenberg
- Education: Bullard High School; California State University, Fresno
- Alma mater: National Theatre Conservatory
- Occupations: Actor; singer; educator
- Years active: 1975–present
- Known for: Into the Woods; Sunday in the Park with George; The Secret Garden
- Spouse: Kim Crosby (m. 1991)
- Children: 3

Robert Westenberg (born October 26, 1953) is an American stage actor and singer, acting teacher, and professor. He received a Tony Award nomination for his performance in the original Broadway cast of Into the Woods.

He appeared on Broadway in Sunday in the Park with George (as the title role), Les Misérables (as Inspector Javert), Into the Woods (as The Big Bad Wolf and Cinderella’s Prince), The Secret Garden (as Dr. Neville Craven), as well as several other musicals. In 2024, he returned to the stage performing as a part of the United States national tour of A Beautiful Noise.

He was the musical theatre coordinator and associate professor in the theatre and dance department at Missouri State University and now serves as a lecturer of Musical Theatre at the University of Colorado Boulder.

== Early life and education ==
Born in Miami Beach, Florida, but raised in Fresno, California, with his six siblings. Westenberg graduated Bullard High School in 1971, where he was active in sports, specifically football. He then attended California State University, Fresno.

Westenberg received a master's degree from Denver’s National Theatre Conservatory.

== Career ==
=== Broadway ===
He made his Broadway debut in the 1983 revival of Zorba as Nikos, for which he won the Theatre World Award.

He played the dual role of a Soldier/Alex and understudied Mandy Patinkin in Stephen Sondheim's Sunday in the Park with George which opened in May 1984. He later took over Patinkin's leading roles of Georges Seurat/George where he played opposite Bernadette Peters in September of that year and played the role until April 1985.

He received a Tony Award nomination and won a Drama Desk Award for his performance as Cinderella's Prince and the Wolf in Sondheim's Into the Woods (1987). It was during this show where he met his wife, Kim Crosby, who played Cinderella.

In 1990, he starred as Inspector Javert in Les Misérables opposite Craig Schulman as Jean Valjean.

In 1991, he starred as Dr. Neville Craven in the original Broadway production of The Secret Garden playing opposite Patinkin again along with Daisy Eagan, Alison Fraser and Rebecca Luker. In 2020, Westenberg directed the same production at Missouri State University, where he served as the head of the Musical Theatre department until joining the Musical Theatre faculty at the University of Colorado Boulder in 2023.

In 1995, he was featured as Harry in the Broadway revival of Company. Two years later he portrayed Lyman Hall in the revival of 1776.

=== Other ===
In 1981, Westenberg played Norman Mushari in Kurt Vonnegut’s God Bless You, Mr. Rosewater at Arena Stage.

In 1994 and 2001, Westenberg starred as Scrooge’s nephew Fred in the musical adaptation of A Christmas Carol in Madison Square Garden.

In 1996, Westenberg was in the US National tour of Funny Girl as Nick Arnstein opposite Debbie Gibson as Fanny Brice. It ended prematurely in November 1996 in Green Bay, Wisconsin.

In 2002, Westenberg was in the US and Japan tour of The Full Monty.

Westenberg has been in several MUNY (St. Louis) productions. He played Henry Higgins in My Fair Lady in 2001 opposite his wife, Kim Crosby, as Eliza Doolittle.

He played the roles of both Mr. Darling and Captain Hook in the July 2007 St. Louis MUNY production of Peter Pan. He reprised these roles in a 2009 production in Branson, Missouri, with Cathy Rigby as Peter Pan. In 2012, he directed a production of Les Misérables at Springfield Little Theatre.

Westenberg is currently starring as the older Neil Diamond in the 2024 national tour of A Beautiful Noise.

=== Television and film ===
Westenberg's film credits include Mr. and Mrs. Bridge and The Ice Storm. He has made guest appearances on Third Watch, Law & Order: Special Victims Unit, and the short-lived series Aliens in the Family. He played Prince Raymond on the soap opera, One Life to Live from 1989-90.

He reprised his roles of a Soldier/Alex and the Wolf/Cinderella’s Prince in the American Playhouse episodes of Sunday in the Park with George and Into the Woods.

== Stage credits ==
Show	Role(s)	Year(s)	Production
Bye Bye Birdie	Conrad Birdie	1975	Good Company Players
Minnie's Boys	Herbert “Zeppo” Marx	1975	Good Company Players
Carousel	Billy Bigelow	1976	Good Company Players
Sweet Charity	Vittorio Vidal	1977	Good Company Players
God Bless You, Mr. Rosewater	Norman Mushari	1981	Arena Stage
Henry IV, Part 1	Vintner / Vernon / Ensemble	1981	Delacorte Theatre in Central Park
The Death of Von Richthofen As Witnessed From Earth	R. Raymond-Barker u/s Manfred Von Richthofen	1982	Off-Broadway
Hamlet	Laertes	1982-1983	Off-Broadway
Zorba	Nikos	1983	National tour
Zorba	Nikos	1983	Original Broadway Revival cast
Sunday in the Park with George	A Soldier / Alex u/s Georges Seurat / George	1984	Original Broadway cast
Sunday in the Park with George	Georges Seurat / George	1984-1985	Broadway replacement
Into the Woods	The Wolf / Cinderella's Prince	1987-1989	Original Broadway cast
She Loves Me	Georg Nowack	1990	Berkshire Theatre Festival
Les Misérables	Inspector Javert	1990	Broadway replacement
The Secret Garden	Dr. Neville Craven	1991-1992	Original Broadway cast
Gay Divorce	Guy	1993	Concert
Abe Lincoln in Illinois	Ninian Edwards	1993-1994	Original Broadway Revival cast
Three Birds Alighting on a Field	Auctioneer / David / Constantin / Ahmet	1994	Off-Broadway
The King and I	The King of Siam	1994	The Muny
A Christmas Carol	Fred Anderson	1994	The Theater at Madison Square Garden
I Sent a Letter to My Love	Stan	1995	Off-Broadway
Company	Harry	1995	Original Broadway Revival cast
Funny Girl	Nick Arnstein	1996	US National tour
Violet	Preacher / Bus Driver 1 / Radio Singer / Bus Driver 4	1997	Off-Broadway
1776	Dr. Lyman Hall	1997	Original Broadway Revival cast
Macbeth	Macduff	1998	Denver Center Theatre Company
Travels with My Aunt	Henry Pulling / Wordsworth / Col. Hakim, Hatty	1998	Denver Center Theatre Company
A Christmas Carol	Charles Dickens / Ghost of Christmas Past	1998	American Conservatory Theater
1776	John Adams	1999	The Muny
The Sound of Music	Captain Georg von Trapp	2000	The Muny
A Funny Thing Happened on the Way to the Forum	Marcus Lycus	2000	The Muny
Art	Marc	2001	Old Globe Theatre
My Fair Lady	Professor Henry Higgins	2001	The Muny
A Christmas Carol	Fred Anderson	2001	The Theater at Madison Square Garden
The Full Monty	Harold Nichols	2002-2004	International tour
The Sound of Music	Captain Georg von Trapp	2005	The Muny
Oliver!	Mr. Brownlow	2006	The Muny
Peter Pan	Captain Hook / Mr. Darling	2007	The Muny
My Fair Lady	Professor Henry Higgins	2008	The Muny
Peter Pan	Captain Hook / Mr. Darling	2009	Branson, Missouri
Les Misérables	Director	2012	Springfield Little Theatre
A Little Night Music	Director	2017	Missouri State University
Pippin	Director	2017	Missouri State University
Amélie	Director	2018	Missouri State University
The Secret Garden	Director	2020	Missouri State University
Brigadoon	Director	2021	Missouri State University
Titanic	Director	2024	University of Colorado Boulder
A Beautiful Noise	Neil Diamond (Now)	2024-2026	US National Tour

== Filmography ==
=== Film ===
Year	Title	Role	Notes
1984	Bearskin, or The Man Who Didn't Wash for Seven Years	Bearskin	Short film
1990	Mr. & Mrs. Bridge	Ruth's Boyfriend	
1995	The Stars Fell on Henrietta	Mr. Rumsfelk	
1996	Before and After	Journalist #1	
1997	The Ice Storm	Rob Halford	

=== Television ===
Year	Title	Role	Notes
1986	American Playhouse	A Soldier / Alex	Episode: "Sunday in the Park With George"
1989-1990	One Life to Live	Prince Raymond Hohenstein	Recurring role
1991	American Playhouse	The Wolf / Cinderella's Prince	Episode: "Into the Woods"
1996	Swift Justice	Leo	Episode: "Where Were You in '72?"
1996	C.P.W.		Episode: "Out On Bail"
1996	Aliens in the Family	High Elder Prissy	Episode: "Respect Your Elders"
2001	Third Watch	Dr. Gambetti	Episode: "Unfinished Business"
2001	Law & Order: Special Victims Unit	Col. Marsden	Episode: "Manhunt"

== Personal life ==
He married actress and singer Kim Crosby on June 19, 1991, and the couple now have three children, Emily, Katie, and Joel.

Westenberg and Crosby currently reside in Longmont, Colorado, where Westenberg serves as a lecturer in Musical Theatre in the College of Music at the University of Colorado Boulder. He was previously the chair of the theatre program at Drury University and coordinator of the musical theatre program at Missouri State University.

== Awards and nominations ==
Year	Work	Award	Category	Result
1984	Zorba	Theatre World Award		Won
1988	Into the Woods	Tony Award	Best Featured Actor In A Musical	Nominated
1988	Into the Woods	Drama Desk Award	Outstanding Featured Actor In A Musical	Won
