= Howard Sings Ashman =

Compilation album by Howard Ashman
- Released: November 11, 2008
- Recorded: 1984–1991
- Genre: Musical theater
- Label: PS Classics
- Producer: Steve Nelson

Howard Sings Ashman is a two-disc album compiled by PS Classics as part of their Songwriter Series. The album features Howard Ashman singing selections from his musicals, including God Bless You, Mr. Rosewater (1979), Little Shop of Horrors (1982), Smile (1986), The Little Mermaid (1989), Beauty and the Beast (1991) and Aladdin (1992).

== Production ==
The album is produced with the assistance and cooperation of Howard's sister Sarah Ashman Gillespie, and his life partner William Lauch. According to PS Classics website, the album "captures the diverse and memorable accomplishments of one of the geniuses of the contemporary American musical theatre."

The album consists of private demo recordings of Howard Ashman. The first disc has 18 tracks which feature Howard's works with Alan Menken, including hits from shows Little Shop of Horrors, The Little Mermaid and Beauty and the Beast, deleted songs from Aladdin, songs from lesser known musical called God Bless You, Mr. Rosewater, individual tracks from Diamonds (with Jonathan Sheffer) and a song from the unfinished musical Babe.

The second disc, a bonus CD, features 15 complete demo tracks from Ashman's collaboration with Marvin Hamlisch, the musical Smile, with Ashman and Hamlisch singing the songs. Smile was a short-lived musical about a teen beauty pageant and did not have a cast album. William Ruhlmann, in his review on AllMusic wrote of Smile: "...the score comes off as witty and appealing, even with two adult men portraying a bunch of teenage girls."

== Track listing ==
=== Disc one ===
No.	Title	Writer(s)	Length
1.	"Da-Doo (from Little Shop of Horrors)"	Howard Ashman, Alan Menken	1:26
2.	"Bad (a song cut from film version of Little Shop of Horrors)"	Ashman, Menken	2:38
3.	"The Rosewater Foundation (from God Bless You, Mr. Rosewater)"	Ashman, Menken	3:34
4.	"Mushari's Waltz [Magical Moment] (from God Bless You, Mr. Rosewater)"	Ashman, Menken	2:56
5.	"Cheese Nips (from God Bless You, Mr. Rosewater)"	Ashman, Menken	2:30
6.	"Growing Boy (from Babe)"	Ashman, Menken	3:52
7.	"The Straw Boater Rag (from Diamonds)"	Ashman, Jonathan Sheffer	3:54
8.	"Sheridan Square"	Ashman, Menken	4:44
9.	"Part of Your World (from The Little Mermaid)"	Ashman, Menken	3:07
10.	"Under the Sea (from The Little Mermaid)"	Ashman, Menken	3:20
11.	"Poor Unfortunate Souls (from The Little Mermaid)"	Ashman, Menken	5:11
12.	"Les Poissons (from The Little Mermaid)"	Ashman, Menken	2:00
13.	"Arabian Nights (from Aladdin)"	Ashman, Menken	3:34
14.	"Bakkak, Omar, Aladdin, Kassim (deleted song from Aladdin)"	Ashman, Menken	2:14
15.	"Call Me a Princess (deleted song from Aladdin)"	Ashman, Menken	3:42
16.	"Gaston (from Beauty and the Beast)"	Ashman, Menken	3:45
17.	"Be Our Guest (from Beauty and the Beast)"	Ashman, Menken	4:42
18.	"Beauty and the Beast (from Beauty and the Beast)"	Ashman, Menken	2:17

=== Disc two ===
No.	Title	Writer(s)	Length
1.	"Typical High School Senior (from Smile)"	Ashman, Marvin Hamlisch	5:13
2.	"Welcom to Santa Rosa"	Ashman, Hamlisch	4:57
3.	"Disneyland"	Ashman, Hamlisch	2:58
4.	"Shine"	Ashman, Hamlisch	7:34
5.	"Postcard 2 - What Was I Thinking?"	Ashman, Hamlisch	1:36
6.	"Nerves"	Ashman, Hamlisch	2:03
7.	"Young and American"	Ashman, Hamlisch	9:36
8.	"Tonight (Act One Finale)"	Ashman, Hamlisch	4:34
9.	"Act 2 Opening / Do It For Me"	Ashman, Hamlisch	4:03
10.	"Ted Farley Sequence"	Ashman, Hamlisch	2:39
11.	"Smile"	Ashman, Hamlisch	6:46
12.	"We Wish We Were You"	Ashman, Hamlisch	3:21
13.	"In Our Hands"	Ashman, Hamlisch	5:12
14.	"Pretty as a Picture (Finale)"	Ashman, Hamlisch	7:54
15.	"Big Bob's Song"	Ashman, Hamlisch	3:30

*"Bad" is an unused song for the 1986 movie, Little Shop Of Horrors. It was replaced by "Mean Green Mother from Outer Space". The song did not make it past the demo stage, but the sequence was storyboarded for the film
