= Kim Crosby (singer) =

American actress and singer (born 1960)

- Born: July 11, 1960 (age 66); Fort Smith, Arkansas
- Education: Southern Methodist University; Manhattan School of Music
- Occupations: Actress, singer
- Years active: 1980–present
- Spouse: Robert Westenberg (m. 1991)
- Children: 3

Kim Crosby (born July 11, 1960) is an American singer and musical theatre actress. She is best known as the original Cinderella in the Sondheim–Lapine musical Into the Woods.

== Early life and education ==
Crosby was born in Fort Smith, Arkansas and grew up in Springfield, Missouri. She attended Southern Methodist University and the Manhattan School of Music, and she is a former America's Junior Miss.

== Career ==
=== Stage work ===
Crosby appeared in the Broadway production of Jerry's Girls in 1985–86. She then created the role of Cinderella in Into the Woods in 1987, playing the role in the tryout at The Old Globe Theatre in San Diego and then on Broadway. It was in this production that she met her future husband, actor Robert Westenberg, who starred opposite her as Cinderella's Prince (and also as the Wolf).

Her next Broadway role was in the 1992 revival of Guys and Dolls, where she was a replacement as Sarah Brown.

She reprised the role of Cinderella at the benefit performance of Into the Woods on November 9, 1997, at The Broadway Theatre.

Off-Broadway, at the York Theatre, she played Anne Boleyn, Catherine Howard and Jane Seymour in the musical Six Wives in 1992, and Marsius in Philemon in 1991.

Crosby starred as Laurey in the national tour of Oklahoma! opposite John Davidson and Jamie Farr. She also toured for two years with Fred Waring and His Young Pennsylvanians. In regional theatre, she played Maria in West Side Story at The Springfield Little Theatre, Anne in A Little Night Music at the Berkshire Theatre Festival, Stockbridge, Massachusetts (1986), Hope Langdon in Something's Afoot at the Birmingham Theatre; David Gordon's The Mysteries and What's So Funny? at the American Repertory Theater, Cambridge, Massachusetts; and Jessie Pullman in the musical Georgia Avenue (July - August 1985) at Goodspeed Musicals, Norma Terris Theater in East Haddam, Connecticut. She appeared in workshop productions of Six Wives, Fahrenheit 451, Grovers Corners, and Jekyll & Hyde. She appeared as Lily Garland in On the Twentieth Century at Barrington Stage in 2001. More recently, she played Sally Durant Plummer in Follies (2005) with the Barrington Stage Company.

She has appeared in several productions at The Muny Repertory in St. Louis, Missouri. She played Eliza Doolittle in My Fair Lady in 2001 opposite Westenberg. She also played Marian in The Music Man in 2004 and Guinevere in Camelot in 2002. Of this performance, the Riverfront Times reviewer wrote: "Crosby can sing a lesser-known song such as "Before I Gaze at You Again" and make us wonder why we've overlooked it all these years. She can sing a popular tune like "I Loved You Once in Silence" and make us realize that Frederick Loewe's score is possessed of a haunting quality reminiscent of Schubert."

Crosby recently played Mrs. Darling and other characters in the new national tour of Peter Pan alongside Cathy Rigby in the title role, which began performances August 2011 and concluded on April 28, 2013. Crosby temporarily left Peter Pan to star in a production of Into The Woods (her first since the original cast) as The Baker's Wife at Springfield Little Theatre from May 13–29, 2012. Her most recent show was Hello, Dolly! at Springfield Little Theatre where she played the title role. Kim also lead Springfield Contemporary Theatre's production of Jerry's Girls in 2016, coming full circle after making her Broadway debut in the ensemble of this show. Ms. Crosby's other productions with Springfield Contemporary Theatre include The Light in the Piazza, Fun Home, and Sweeney Todd: The Demon Barber of Fleet Street.

=== Television and concerts ===
Crosby's television credits include Jane in Tarzan in Manhattan (CBS, 1989). In this version, Jane was a tough-talking New York City cabbie who befriended Tarzan (played by Joe Lara), they are in search of Cheeta and other animals captured and taken from the jungle. She appeared in the soap operas Guiding Light and All My Children, and in The Cosby Mysteries as "Mrs. Pierce" in the episode "Big Brother Is Watching" (1995).

Crosby has sung in concert with orchestras both in the U.S. and abroad. She performed with the Florida Orchestra, in Tampa, at Kaleidoscope of Broadway in 2004. She sang with the South Arkansas Symphony in a Christmas pops concert in December 2004. She has toured frequently with the ensemble Broadway Nights. In the Broadway Nights concert with the Lincoln Symphony in March 2002, the reviewer noted that when singing songs from Phantom, "Crosby stole the show with 'Think of Me'".

== Acting credits ==
=== Theatre ===
Year	Title	Role	Notes
1985	Jerry's Girls	Performer	Broadway
1986-87	Into the Woods	Cinderella	Old Globe Theatre Premiere
1987	Into the Woods	Cinderella	Original Broadway cast
1989	Into the Woods	Cinderella	Original Broadway cast
1990	Oklahoma!	Laurey Williams	
1992-95	Guys and Dolls	Martha u/s Sarah Brown u/s Agatha	Broadway replacement
1992-95	Guys and Dolls	Sarah Brown	Broadway replacement
1995	Guys and Dolls	Sarah Brown	Desert Inn and Country Club
1997	Into the Woods	Cinderella	10th Anniversary Concert
2001	My Fair Lady	Eliza Doolittle	The Muny opposite Robert Westenberg
2002	Camelot	Guinevere	The Muny
2004	The Music Man	Marian Paroo	The Muny
2008	90 Years of Muny Magic		The Muny
2010	The Light in the Piazza	Margaret Johnson	Springfield Contemporary Theatre
2011	Peter Pan	Mrs. Darling/Mermaid/Adult Wendy	National tour
2012	Into the Woods	The Baker's Wife	Landers Theatre
2013	Rodgers & Hart: A Celebration	Performer	Springfield Contemporary Theatre
2016	Jerry's Girls	Performer	Springfield Contemporary Theatre
2018	Fun Home	Helen Bechdel	Springfield Contemporary Theatre
2020	Hello, Dolly!	Dolly Gallagher Levi	Landers Theatre
2022	Sweeney Todd: The Demon Barber of Fleet Street	Mrs. Nellie Lovett	Springfield Contemporary Theatre

=== Filmography ===
Year	Title	Role	Notes
1979	The Mike Douglas Show	Self	Episode: "18.119"
1989	Tarzan in Manhattan	Jane Porter	Television film
1991	American Playhouse	Cinderella	Episode: "Into the Woods"
1995	The Cosby Mysteries	Mrs. Pierce	Episode: "Big Brother is Watching"
2012	The Mystery Hour	Self	Episode: "Kim Crosby/John Pinney"

== Personal life ==
Crosby and Robert Westenberg married on June 19, 1991. They live in Springfield, Missouri with their three children, Emily, Katie, and Joel. The family has since moved to Colorado, following Kim and Robert's retirement.
