= Stephen Mark Lukas =

American actor

- Born: Kennebunkport, Maine, U.S.
- Occupations: Actor; singer
- Years active: 2005–present
- Known for: Funny Girl

Stephen Mark Lukas is an American actor. He’s best known for his roles on the Broadway stage. His Broadway and touring credits include roles in the musicals Funny Girl, The Book of Mormon, and Beauty and the Beast.

== Filmography ==
=== Television ===
Ref:

| Year | Production | Role | Notes |
|---|---|---|---|
| 2012 | Gossip Girl | Reporter #2 | Episode: "Despicable B" |
| 2021 | FBI: Most Wanted | Daniel Carter | Episode: "Lovesick" |
| 2024 | Elsbeth | Fire Marshal Lee Sparks | Episode: "Gold, Frankincense, and Murder" |

== Theatre credits ==
Ref:

| Year | Production | Role | Theatre |
|---|---|---|---|
| 2006 | Hello, Dolly! | Ensemble | Ogunquit Playhouse |
| 2006 | Cinderella | Ensemble | Ogunquit Playhouse |
| 2008 | Little Women | Theodore "Laurie" Laurence / Rodrigo | US National Tour |
| 2011 | Oklahoma! | Curly McLain | Reagle Music Theatre of Greater Boston |
| 2012 | The Book of Mormon | Elder Price (standby) | Eugene O'Neill Theatre, Broadway |
| 2012-2014 | The Book of Mormon | Elder Price (standby) | US National Tour |
| 2014 | Damn Yankees | Joe Hardy | Goodspeed Musicals |
| 2016 | Oklahoma! | Curly McLain | Merry-Go-Round Playhouse |
| 2016 | Camelot | Sir Lancelot | Westport Country Playhouse |
| 2017 | Guys and Dolls | Sky Masterson | Pickard Theater at Bowdoin College |
| 2018 | South Pacific | Lt. Joseph Cable, USMC | Maltz Jupiter Theatre |
| 2018 | Oklahoma! | Curly McLain | Ogunquit Playhouse |
| 2019 | Beauty and the Beast | Gaston | Paper Mill Playhouse |
| 2019 | Guys and Dolls | Sky Masterson | Axelrod Performing Arts Center |
| 2022-2023 | Funny Girl | Ensemble u/s Nick Arnstein u/s Ziegfeld Tenor | August Wilson Theatre, Broadway |
| 2023 | Funny Girl | Nick Arnstein | August Wilson Theatre, Broadway |
| 2023 | Funny Girl | Ensemble u/s Nick Arnstein u/s Ziegfeld Tenor | August Wilson Theatre, Broadway |
| 2023-2025 | Funny Girl | Nick Arnstein | US National Tour |
| 2025-2026 | Beauty and the Beast | Gaston | US National Tour |
