= Janie Sell =

American actress (1939–2026)

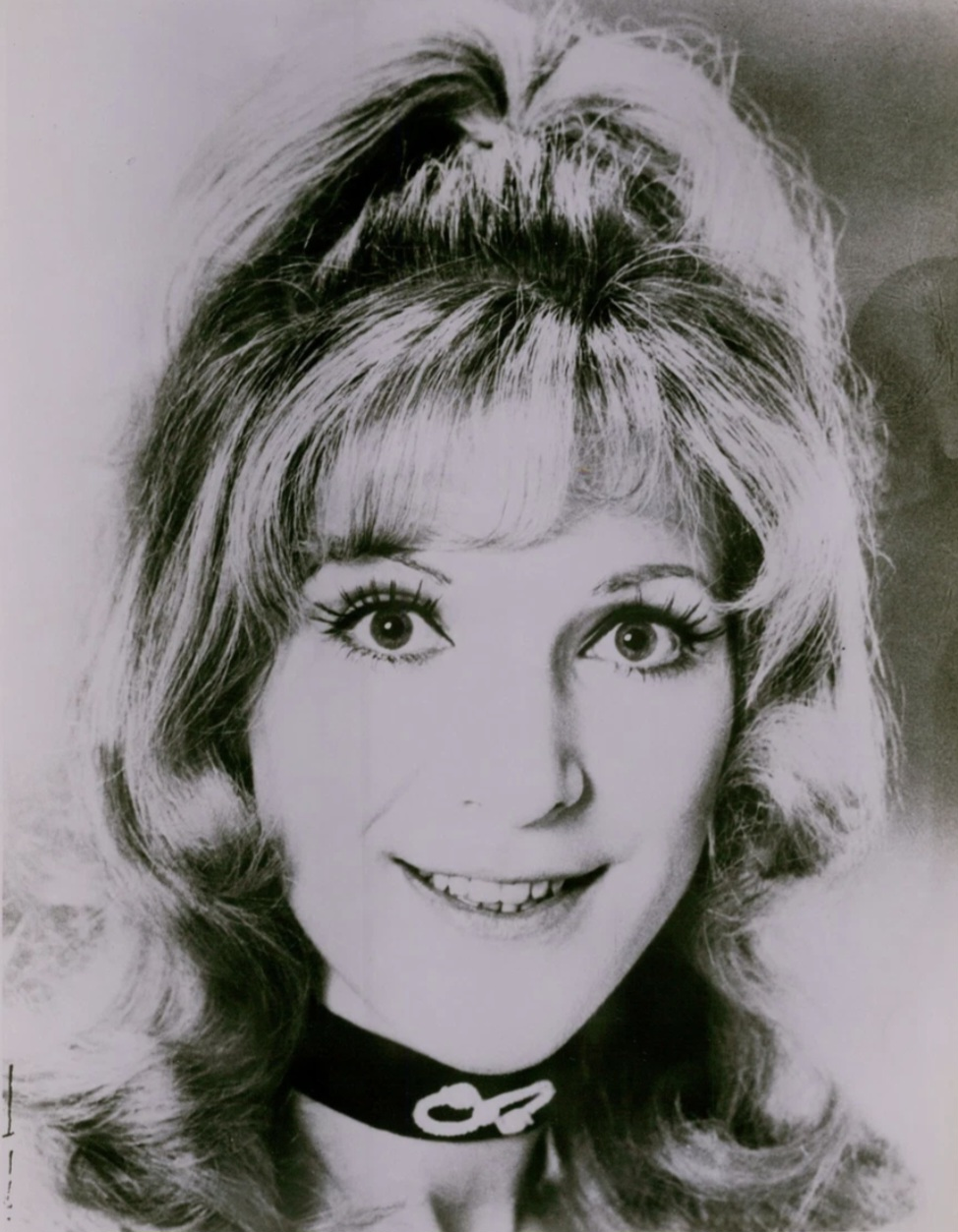
- Sell in 1974
- Born: Jane Ann Sell; October 1, 1939; Detroit, Michigan, U.S.
- Died: June 9, 2026 (aged 86)
- Other name: Jane Ann Trese (married name)
- Occupations: Actress, singer
- Spouse(s): Patrick Trese (secondly; c. 1990-)
- Children: 1 (by her first marriage)
- Awards: Best Featured Actress in a Musical; 1974 Over Here!

Jane Ann Sell (October 1, 1939 – June 9, 2026) was an American stage actress. She performed in plays and musicals both on and off-Broadway, as well as in some films and television episodes.

== Life and career ==
Sell won the Tony Award for Best Featured Actress in a Musical for Over Here!, which also starred the then-surviving Andrews Sisters Maxene and Patty, and introduced John Travolta and Marilu Henner to Broadway. She also appeared in George M!, I Love My Wife, Irene, Dames at Sea and a revival of Pal Joey. She appeared off-Broadway in Kurt Vonnegut's God Bless You, Mr. Rosewater in 1979 at the Entermedia Theater. The musical comedy version of Vonnegut's novel was adapted and directed by Howard Ashman, with music by Alan Menken, and lyrics by Ashman and Dennis Green.

She substituted for Carol Burnett in each Wednesday matinée performance of the comedy Moon Over Buffalo, which co-starred Philip Bosco, in the mid-1990s.

Sell died after a brief illness on June 9, 2026, at the age of 86.

== Acting credits ==
=== Theatre ===
Year	Title	Role	Notes
1968	George M!	Mrs. Baker/Mme. Grimaldi/Flamethrower's Assistant	Broadway
1973	Irene	Jane Burke, Irene O'Dare (u/s)	Broadway
1974	Over Here!	Mitzi	Broadway
1976	Pal Joey	Gladys Bumps	Broadway
1977	I Love My Wife	Monica	Broadway
1977	Happy End	Lillian Holiday	Broadway
1979	Kurt Vonnegut's God Bless You, Mr. Rosewater	Sylvia Rosewater	Off-Broadway
1995	Moon Over Buffalo	Charlotte Hay (standby), Ethel (standby)	Broadway

=== Television and film ===
Year	Title	Role	Notes
1975	Wives	Frannie	TV movie
1979	Starting Fresh	Phoebe Johnson	TV movie
1979	Lost and Found	Zelda	
1980	Captain Kangaroo	Old Mother Hubbard	1 episode
1983	Your Place...Or Mine	Sandy	TV movie
1984	A Good Sport	Sherry	TV movie
