= Howard Ashman =

American playwright, lyricist, and director (1950–1991)

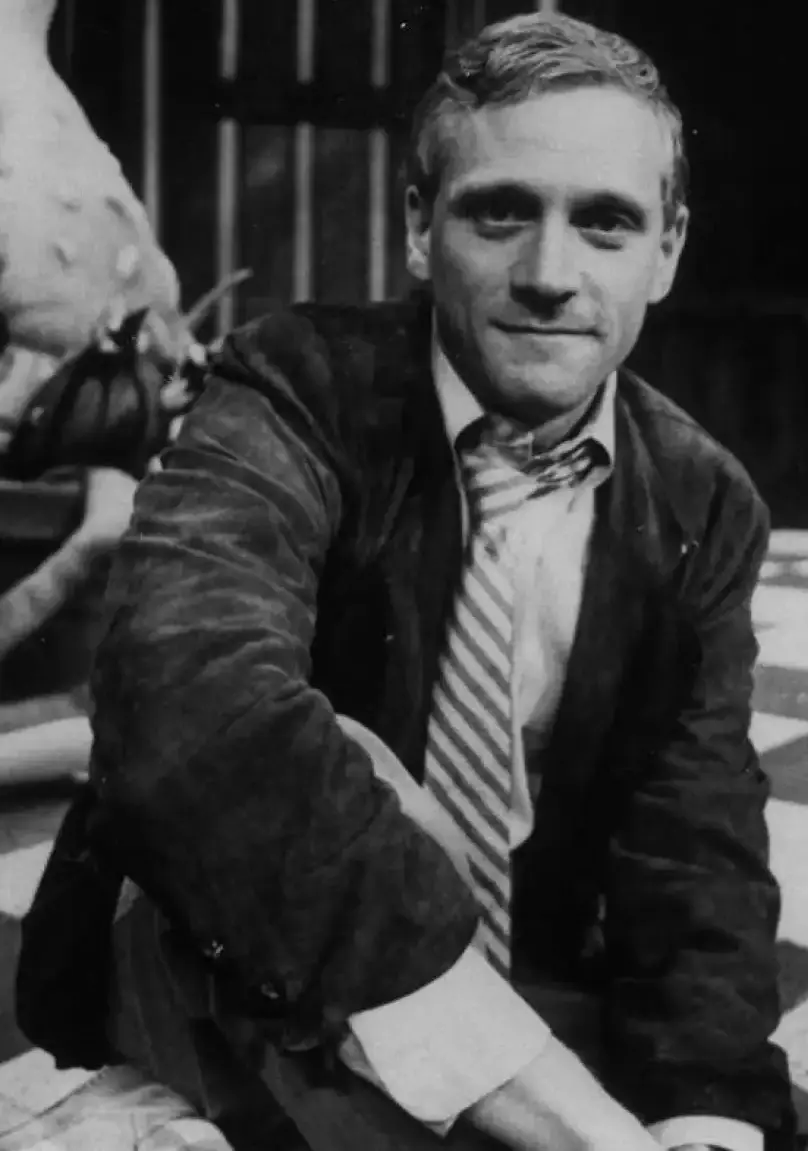
- Ashman in 1987 on the set of the musical Little Shop of Horrors
- Born: Howard Elliott Ashman; May 17, 1950; Baltimore, Maryland, U.S.
- Died: March 14, 1991 (aged 40); New York City, U.S.
- Resting place: Ohev Shalom Memorial Park, Reisterstown, Maryland, U.S.
- Education: Boston University; Goddard College (BA); Indiana University (MFA)
- Occupations: Playwright; lyricist; stage director
- Years active: 1977–1991
- Notable work: Little Shop of Horrors; The Little Mermaid; Beauty and the Beast; Aladdin
- Partner(s): Stuart White (1969–1980, 1983); Bill Lauch (1984–1991)
- Awards: 2 Academy Awards (1989, 1991); 5 Grammy Awards (1991, 1993, 1994)

Howard Elliott Ashman (May 17, 1950 – March 14, 1991) was an American playwright, lyricist, and stage director. He is most widely known for his work on feature films for Walt Disney Animation Studios, for which Ashman wrote the lyrics and Alan Menken composed the music. Ashman has been credited as being a main driving force behind the Disney Renaissance. His work included songs for Little Shop of Horrors, The Little Mermaid, Beauty and the Beast, and Aladdin. He died of AIDS complications in 1991.

== Early life and education ==
Ashman was born in Baltimore, Maryland, the son of Shirley Thelma (née Glass) and Raymond Albert Ashman, an ice cream cone manufacturer. His family was Jewish. He started his theater experiences with the Children's Theater Association (CTA), playing roles such as Peter Pan. Ashman spent his first year of college as a theatre major at Boston University, before transferring to Goddard College where he earned his Bachelor of Arts in 1971. In the summer of 1969, he attended Tufts University's Summer Theater. He went on to earn a Master of Fine Arts at Indiana University in 1974.

== Career ==
After graduating from Indiana University in 1974, Ashman moved to New York and worked as an editor at Grosset & Dunlap. His first two plays, Cause Maggie's Afraid of the Dark and Dreamstuff, were met with mixed reviews. Ashman's play The Confirmation was produced in 1977 at Princeton's McCarter Theater and starred Herschel Bernardi. In 1977, he became the artistic director of the Workshop of the Players Art Foundation's WPA Theater in New York. Ashman met future collaborator Alan Menken at the BMI Workshop, where he was classmates with Maury Yeston and Ed Kleban, among others. He first worked with Menken on the 1979 musical Kurt Vonnegut's God Bless You, Mr. Rosewater, adapted from Vonnegut's novel of the same name. The pair won critical acclaim with Little Shop of Horrors with Ashman as director, lyricist, and librettist. The show became a cult Off-Broadway hit, winning the Drama Desk Award for Outstanding Lyrics and receiving a Grammy Award nomination. In 1981 Ashman also directed the workshop of Nine by Yeston at the Eugene O'Neill Theater Center, and after asking why Guido's wife stays with him after she knows he has not been faithful, inspired Yeston to write "My Husband Makes Movies".

Ashman was director, lyricist, and book writer for the 1986 Broadway musical Smile (music by Marvin Hamlisch). It was here he met Jodi Benson, who would go on to play Ariel. This musical was generally not well received and closed with only 48 performances. However, Ashman received a nomination at the Tony Awards for Best Book of a Musical. Also in 1986, Ashman wrote the screenplay for the Frank Oz–directed film adaptation of his musical Little Shop of Horrors, as well as contributing the lyrics for two new songs, "Some Fun Now" and "Mean Green Mother from Outer Space", the latter of which received an Academy Award nomination.

In 1986, Ashman was brought in to write lyrics for a song in Walt Disney Animation Studios' Oliver & Company. He then also worked with Tina Turner on a script which never came to fruition. While at Disney, Ashman was offered several works which had been on the back burner. He eventually chose to work on The Little Mermaid, a project Disney had been working on for a couple years. Ashman joined the production as the producer and lyricist. Menken, who Ashman requested join in the project, composed the score. As producer of The Little Mermaid Ashman advocated for integrating the medium of animation with musicals, becoming a driving force during the early years of the "Disney Renaissance". Part of this was casting actors with strong musical theater and acting backgrounds. The Little Mermaid was released in November 1989 and was an enormous success. Ashman and Menken received two nominations at the Golden Globe Awards and three nominations at the Academy Awards, including two Best Original Song nominations for "Kiss the Girl" and "Under The Sea." Ashman and Menken won for the latter.

In 1988, while working on The Little Mermaid, Ashman pitched the idea of an animated musical adaptation of Aladdin to Disney. After he wrote a film treatment and a group of songs with partner Alan Menken, Linda Woolverton, who would also work on Beauty and the Beast, contributed a screenplay. At the time, this was turned down by Jeffrey Katzenberg who did not like the treatment. When production continued after Ashman's death, the story underwent many changes with several elements of the original treatment being dropped. Out of all the songs written for Aladdin, three of Ashman's songs ended up in the finished film.

During the early production of Aladdin, Ashman and Menken were approached to help reinvigorate and save the production of Beauty and the Beast, which was not a musical. Ashman, whose health was beginning to decline reluctantly agreed. Disney accommodated his illness by shifting much of the production process to New York. He completed the lyrics. The film was released mere months after his death and is dedicated to him. In May 2020, Beauty and the Beast co-director Kirk Wise said, "If you had to point to one person responsible for the 'Disney Renaissance', I would say it was Howard."

In March 1992, a little over a year following Ashman's death, he and Alan Menken won the Oscar for Best Original Song for "Beauty and the Beast", the theme song from the film of the same name. In March 1993, Ashman and Menken received another Best Original Score nomination at the Oscars for the song "Friend Like Me", ultimately losing to "A Whole New World", which Menken cowrote with Tim Rice after Ashman's death. Both songs were from Aladdin. Along with Menken, Ashman was the co-recipient of two Grammy Awards, two Golden Globe Awards, and two Academy Awards.

== Personal life ==
Ashman met Stuart White, one of his first partners, at a summer university program in 1969. Originally close friends, the two formed a bond which led to a relationship. They both completed master's degrees at Indiana University and then moved to New York. Ashman and White re-opened the WPA Theater together as artistic directors. The two fell out in 1980, but reacquainted briefly in 1983, slightly before White's death as a result of AIDS. Ashman then met Bill Lauch in 1984, who worked as an architect. Lauch accepted Ashman's posthumous Oscar for Beauty and the Beast in 1992.

== Death ==
Ashman was diagnosed with HIV/AIDS in 1988 during production of The Little Mermaid, as he continued to write songs. Peter Kunze noted that Ashman was supported by Jeffrey Katzenberg; Disney created a production unit near his home in Beacon, New York, allowing him to continue working on Beauty and the Beast while undergoing treatment at the Saint Vincent's Catholic Medical Centers in New York City. Ashman died at Saint Vincent's on March 14, 1991, at the age of 40, prior to the film's completion. Beauty and the Beast was dedicated to his memory, featuring the message after the end credits: "To our friend, Howard, who gave a mermaid her voice and a beast his soul, we will be forever grateful. Howard Ashman 1950–1991". He was buried in the Oheb Shalom Cemetery in Reisterstown, Maryland.

== Awards and nominations ==
Over the course of his career, Ashman won two Academy Awards (one posthumous) out of seven nominations. Of these nominations, four are posthumous nominations, the most in Academy Awards history. He also won a posthumous Laurence Olivier Award and five Grammy Awards (three of them posthumous), among other accolades.

=== Accolades ===
| Award | Year | Project | Category | Outcome |
|---|---|---|---|---|
| Academy Awards | 1986 | Little Shop of Horrors | Best Original Song for the song "Mean Green Mother from Outer Space" | Nominated |
| Academy Awards | 1989 | The Little Mermaid | Best Original Song for the song "Under the Sea" | Won |
| Academy Awards | 1989 | The Little Mermaid | Best Original Song for the song "Kiss the Girl" | Nominated |
| Academy Awards | 1991 | Beauty and the Beast | Best Original Song for the song "Beauty and the Beast" (Posthumous) | Won |
| Academy Awards | 1991 | Beauty and the Beast | Best Original Song for the song "Be Our Guest" (Posthumous) | Nominated |
| Academy Awards | 1991 | Beauty and the Beast | Best Original Song for the song "Belle" (Posthumous) | Nominated |
| Academy Awards | 1992 | Aladdin | Best Original Song for the song "Friend Like Me" (Posthumous) | Nominated |
| British Academy Film Awards | 1992 | Beauty and the Beast | Best Film Music | Nominated |
| Drama Desk Awards | 1983 | Little Shop of Horrors | Outstanding Lyrics | Won |
| Drama Desk Awards | 1983 | Little Shop of Horrors | Outstanding Director of a Musical | Nominated |
| Drama Desk Awards | 1994 | Beauty and the Beast | Outstanding Lyrics (Posthumous) | Nominated |
| Drama Desk Awards | 2014 | Aladdin | Outstanding Lyrics (Posthumous) | Nominated |
| Evening Standard Awards | 1983 | Little Shop of Horrors | Best Musical | Won |
| Golden Globe Awards | 1989 | The Little Mermaid | Best Original Song for the song "Under the Sea" | Won |
| Golden Globe Awards | 1989 | The Little Mermaid | Best Original Song for the song "Kiss the Girl" | Nominated |
| Golden Globe Awards | 1991 | Beauty and the Beast | Best Original Song for the song "Beauty and the Beast" (Posthumous) | Won |
| Golden Globe Awards | 1991 | Beauty and the Beast | Best Original Song for the song "Be Our Guest" (Posthumous) | Nominated |
| Golden Globe Awards | 1992 | Aladdin | Best Original Song for the song "Friend Like Me" (Posthumous) | Nominated |
| Golden Globe Awards | 1992 | Aladdin | Best Original Song for the song "Prince Ali" (Posthumous) | Nominated |
| Grammy Awards | 1984 | Little Shop of Horrors | Best Musical Cast Show Album | Nominated |
| Grammy Awards | 1990 | Oliver and Company: Story and Songs from the Motion Picture | Best Recording for Children | Nominated |
| Grammy Awards | 1991 | The Little Mermaid: Original Walt Disney Records Soundtrack | Best Recording for Children | Won |
| Grammy Awards | 1991 | The Little Mermaid | Best Song Written Specifically for a Motion Picture or Television for the song "Under the Sea" | Won |
| Grammy Awards | 1991 | The Little Mermaid | Best Song Written Specifically for a Motion Picture or Television for the song "Kiss the Girl" | Nominated |
| Grammy Awards | 1993 | Beauty and the Beast: Original Motion Picture Soundtrack | Best Musical Album for Children (Posthumous) | Won |
| Grammy Awards | 1993 | Beauty and the Beast: Original Motion Picture Soundtrack | Album of the Year (Posthumous) | Nominated |
| Grammy Awards | 1993 | Beauty and the Beast | Best Song Written Specifically for a Motion Picture or Television for the song "Beauty and the Beast" (Posthumous) | Won |
| Grammy Awards | 1993 | Beauty and the Beast | Song of the Year for the song "Beauty and the Beast" (Posthumous) | Nominated |
| Grammy Awards | 1994 | Aladdin: Original Motion Picture Soundtrack | Best Musical Album for Children (Posthumous) | Won |
| Grammy Awards | 1994 | Aladdin | Best Song Written Specifically for a Motion Picture or Television for the song "Friend Like Me" (Posthumous) | Nominated |
| Laurence Olivier Awards | 1983 | Little Shop of Horrors | Musical of the Year | Nominated |
| Laurence Olivier Awards | 1998 | Beauty and the Beast | Best New Musical (Posthumous) | Won |
| New York Drama Critics' Circle Awards | 1983 | Little Shop of Horrors | Best Musical | Won |
| Outer Critics Circle Awards | 1983 | Little Shop of Horrors | Best Off-Broadway Musical | Won |
| Outer Critics Circle Awards | 1983 | Little Shop of Horrors | Best Score | Won |
| Tony Awards | 1987 | Smile | Best Book of a Musical | Nominated |
| Tony Awards | 1994 | Beauty and the Beast | Best Original Score (Posthumous) | Nominated |
| Tony Awards | 2008 | The Little Mermaid | Best Original Score (Posthumous) | Nominated |
| Tony Awards | 2014 | Aladdin | Best Original Score (Posthumous) | Nominated |

=== Special recognitions ===
- 1990 – Special Award for outstanding contribution to the success of the Academy of Television Arts and Sciences' anti-drug special for children, for the song "Wonderful Ways to Say No" from the TV special Cartoon All-Stars to the Rescue
- 2001 – Disney Legend Award (posthumous)

=== Tributes ===
On the 2002 Special Edition DVD of Beauty and the Beast, the Disney animators teamed up again and added a new song called "Human Again", which Ashman and Menken had written for the film but had been cut from the finished product. On Disc 2, there is a short documentary entitled Howard Ashman: In Memoriam that features many people who worked on Beauty and the Beast who talk about Ashman's involvement on the film and how his death was truly a loss for them.

Jeffrey Katzenberg claims there are two angels watching down on them that put their magic touch on every film they made. Those two angels are Ashman and Walt Disney himself.

An album of Ashman singing his own work entitled Howard Sings Ashman was released on November 11, 2008, by PS Classics as part of the Library of Congress "Songwriter Series".

The 2009 documentary, Waking Sleeping Beauty, which centers around Disney's animation renaissance, is dedicated to him, as well as Frank Wells, Joe Ranft, and Roy E. Disney.

In March 2017, Don Hahn confirmed he was working on a documentary biographical film about Howard Ashman. The documentary film titled Howard premiered at the Tribeca Film Festival on April 22, 2018, before having a limited theatrical run on December 18, 2018. It was released on Disney+ on August 7, 2020, and was initially slated for removal on May 26, 2023. However, Disney reversed course in response to fan outcry.

Like with the original Beauty and the Beast, the 2023 live-action adaptation of The Little Mermaid was also dedicated to his memory.

== Credits ==
- The Confirmation (1977) (writer)
- God Bless You, Mr. Rosewater (1979) (lyricist, librettist and director)
- Little Shop of Horrors (1982) (lyricist, librettist and director)
- Smile (1986) (lyricist, librettist and director)
- Little Shop of Horrors (1986) (lyricist and screenwriter)
- Oliver & Company (1988) (lyricist for "Once Upon a Time in New York City")
- The Little Mermaid (1989) (lyricist, producer, additional dialogue)
- Cartoon All-Stars to the Rescue (1990) (lyricist for "Wonderful Way to Say No")
- Beauty and the Beast (1991) (lyricist, executive producer) (dedicated)
- Aladdin (1992) (lyricist for "Arabian Nights", "Friend Like Me", and "Prince Ali").
- What's Love Got to Do with It (1993) (uncredited story draft)
