= Funny Girl (musical) =

1964 musical based on the life of Fanny Brice

- Original cast album
- Music: Jule Styne
- Lyrics: Bob Merrill
- Book: Isobel Lennart
- Basis: The life of Fanny Brice
- Productions: 1964 Broadway; 1966 West End; 1966 Australasian tour 1996 US Tour; 1999 Melbourne; 2015 Menier Chocolate Factory; 2016 West End revival 2016 Melbourne; 2017 UK Tour; 2022 Broadway revival 2023 US Tour

Funny Girl is a musical with score by Jule Styne, lyrics by Bob Merrill, and book by Isobel Lennart, that first opened on Broadway in 1964. The semi-biographical plot is based on the life and career of comedian and Broadway star Fanny Brice, featuring her stormy relationship with entrepreneur and gambler Nicky Arnstein.

Barbra Streisand starred in the original Broadway musical, produced by Brice's son-in-law Ray Stark. The production received eight nominations at the 18th Tony Awards. The original cast recording of Funny Girl was inducted into the Grammy Hall of Fame in 2004.

A Broadway revival opened April 24, 2022, starring Beanie Feldstein as Brice and Ramin Karimloo as Arnstein. Lea Michele stepped into the lead role that September, with rave reviews prompting a new Broadway cast recording two months later.

== Background ==
Stark married Fanny Brice's and Nicky Arnstein's daughter Frances Brice in 1940. In telling Fanny's story, Stark produced the Broadway musical, film version and film sequel Funny Lady.

Ray Stark commissioned an authorized biography of Brice, based on taped recollections that she had dictated, but the result of which she was unhappy with. Stopping the publication of The Fabulous Fanny, as it had been titled by the author, eventually cost him $50,000. Stark then turned to Ben Hecht to write the screenplay for a biopic, but neither Hecht nor the 10 writers who succeeded him were able to produce a version that satisfied Stark. Finally, Isobel Lennart submitted My Man, which pleased both Stark and Columbia Pictures executives, who offered Stark $400,000 plus a percentage of the gross for the property.

After reading the screenplay, Mary Martin contacted Stark and proposed it be adapted for a stage musical. Stark discussed the possibility with producer David Merrick, who suggested Jule Styne and Stephen Sondheim compose the score. Sondheim told Styne "I don't want to do the life of Fanny Brice with Mary Martin. She's not Jewish. You need someone ethnic for the part." Shortly after, Martin lost interest in the project and withdrew.

Merrick discussed the project with Jerome Robbins, who gave the screenplay to Anne Bancroft. She agreed to play Brice if she could handle the score. Merrick suggested Styne collaborate with Dorothy Fields, but the composer was not interested. He went to Palm Beach, Florida for a month and composed music he thought Bancroft would be able to sing. While he was there, he met Bob Merrill, and he played the five melodies he already had written for him. Merrill agreed to write lyrics for them; these included "Who Are You Now?" and "The Music That Makes Me Dance". Styne was happy with the results and the two men completed the rest of the score, then flew to Los Angeles to play it for Stark, Robbins, and Bancroft. Bancroft was at odds with Merrill because of an earlier personal conflict, and after listening to the score, she stated "I want no part of this. It's not for me".

With Bancroft out of the picture, Eydie Gormé was considered, but she agreed to play Brice only if her husband Steve Lawrence was cast as Nick Arnstein. Because they thought he was wrong for the role, Stark and Robbins approached Carol Burnett, who said "I'd love to do it but what you need is a Jewish girl." With options running out, Styne recalled Barbra Streisand, whom he remembered from I Can Get It for You Wholesale, and thought that she would be perfect. She was performing at the Bon Soir in Greenwich Village at the time; Styne urged Robbins to go see her there. He was impressed and asked her to audition. Styne later recalled, "She looked awful ... All her clothes were out of thrift shops. I saw Fran Stark staring at her, obvious distaste on her face." Despite his wife's objections, Stark hired Streisand on the spot.

Robbins had an argument with Lennart and told Stark he wanted her replaced because he thought she was not capable of adapting her screenplay into a viable book for a stage musical. Stark refused and Robbins quit the project.

Funny Girl temporarily was shelved, and Styne moved on to other projects, including Fade Out – Fade In for Carol Burnett. Merrick signed Bob Fosse to direct Funny Girl, and work began on it again, until Fosse quit and the show went into limbo for several months, at which point Merrick suggested that Stark hire Garson Kanin. It was Merrick's last contribution to the production; shortly afterward he bowed out, and Stark became sole producer.

Streisand was not enthusiastic about Kanin as a director and insisted she wanted Robbins back, especially after Kanin suggested "People" be cut from the score because it didn't fit the character. Streisand already had recorded the song for a single release, and Merrill insisted, "It has to be in the show because it's the greatest thing she's ever done." Based on audience reaction to it, Kanin agreed to let it remain. By the time the show opened in Boston, audiences were so familiar with "People" that they applauded it during the overture.

There were problems with the script and score throughout rehearsals, and when Funny Girl opened at the Shubert Theatre in Boston, it was still too long, even after thirty minutes had been cut. The critics praised Streisand but disliked the show. Lennart continued to edit her book and deleted another thirty minutes before the show moved to Philadelphia, where critics thought the show could be a hit if the libretto problems were rectified.

The New York opening was postponed five times while extra weeks were played out of town. Funny Girl played two tryout periods in Philadelphia at the Forrest and Erlanger theaters. Five songs were cut, and "You Are Woman", a solo for Sydney Chaplin, was rewritten as a counterpoint duet. Streisand was still unhappy with Kanin and was pleased when Robbins returned to oversee the choreography by Carol Haney.

Kanin's novel Smash is based loosely on his experience directing Funny Girl.

== Productions ==
=== Broadway ===
After 17 previews, the Broadway production opened March 26, 1964 at the Winter Garden Theatre, subsequently transferring to the Majestic Theatre and The Broadway Theatre, where it closed on July 1, 1967 to complete its total run of 1,348 performances. The musical was directed by Garson Kanin and choreographed by Carol Haney under the supervision of Jerome Robbins. In addition to Streisand and Chaplin, the original cast included Kay Medford, Danny Meehan, Jean Stapleton, and Lainie Kazan, who also served as Streisand's understudy. Later in the run, Streisand and Chaplin were replaced by Mimi Hines and Johnny Desmond, and Hines' husband and comedy partner Phil Ford also joined the cast. A young Alan Weeks portrayed Five Finger Finney and was a dancer in the original cast.

=== West End ===
Streisand reprised her role in the West End production at the Prince of Wales Theatre directed by Lawrence Kasha, which opened April 13, 1966. She insisted upon having British film and stage star Michael Craig as her leading man. When Streisand became pregnant and had to drop out of the show, her understudy Lisa Shane, wife of The Italian Job director Peter Collinson, took over, and continued to perform until the show closed.

=== Australia ===
The Australasian premiere season commenced March 4, 1966, at Her Majesty's Theatre, Sydney. The production starred Jill Perryman as Fanny Brice, Bruce Barry as Nick Arnstein, Evie Hayes as Mrs. Brice, and Bill Yule as Eddie Ryan.

In 1999, The Production Company produced Funny Girl at the Arts Centre Melbourne, starring Caroline O'Connor and Nancye Hayes. The production was revived in 2016, with O'Connor and Hayes reprising their roles.

A concert version was staged at the Sydney Opera House from July 12–14, 2018. The role of Fanny Brice on stage was shared by Michala Banas, Natalie Bassingthwaighte, Casey Donovan, Virginia Gay, Verity Hunt-Ballard, Dami Im, Maggie McKenna, Zahra Newman, Caroline O’Connor, Queenie van de Zandt and Megan Washington. The show also starred Trevor Ashley, Nancye Hayes and Don Hany as Nick Arnstein.

=== North American tours ===
The First National Tour gave top billing to Lillian Roth as Mrs. Brice, Anthony George as Nick, with Marilyn Michaels as Fanny billed third.

A 1996 United States National tour starred Debbie Gibson as Fanny Brice and Robert Westenberg as Nick Arnstein. The planned 30-city tour started in Pittsburgh, Pennsylvania in October 1996, but ended prematurely in November 1996 in Green Bay, Wisconsin.

A 2023 United States national tour of the 2022 Broadway revival opened in Providence, Rhode Island on September 9, 2023, starring Katerina McCrimmon, Stephen Mark Lukas, and Melissa Manchester.

=== West End revival ===
The show's first ever full-scale revival began previews at the Menier Chocolate Factory on November 20, 2015, officially opening December 2 for a limited run to March 5, 2016. The production starred Sheridan Smith, with Darius Campbell as Nick, directed by Michael Mayer, with a revised book by Harvey Fierstein. The entire run sold out within a day, making it the Menier's fastest selling show on record. Following this, the show transferred to London's Savoy Theatre on April 9, 2016, for a run through to September 10, 2016. The show subsequently extended until October 8 due to phenomenal public demand. However, Smith became indisposed on April 28, 2016, and the show was halted 15 minutes in. She was replaced by her understudy Natasha J Barnes, who continued to play the role until Smith's eventual return on July 8.

A UK tour of the Menier production began in February 2017 at the Palace Theatre, Manchester. After very favourable reviews, both Smith and Barnes returned to the role of Fanny Brice and alternative venues throughout the UK tour.

=== Paris ===
A Paris production opened in November 2019 at Théâtre Marigny, directed and choreographed by Stephen Mear and featuring Christina Bianco as Fanny. The show received unanimous rave reviews, with significant praise for Bianco. The production was extended, doubling its initial run dates.

=== Broadway revival ===
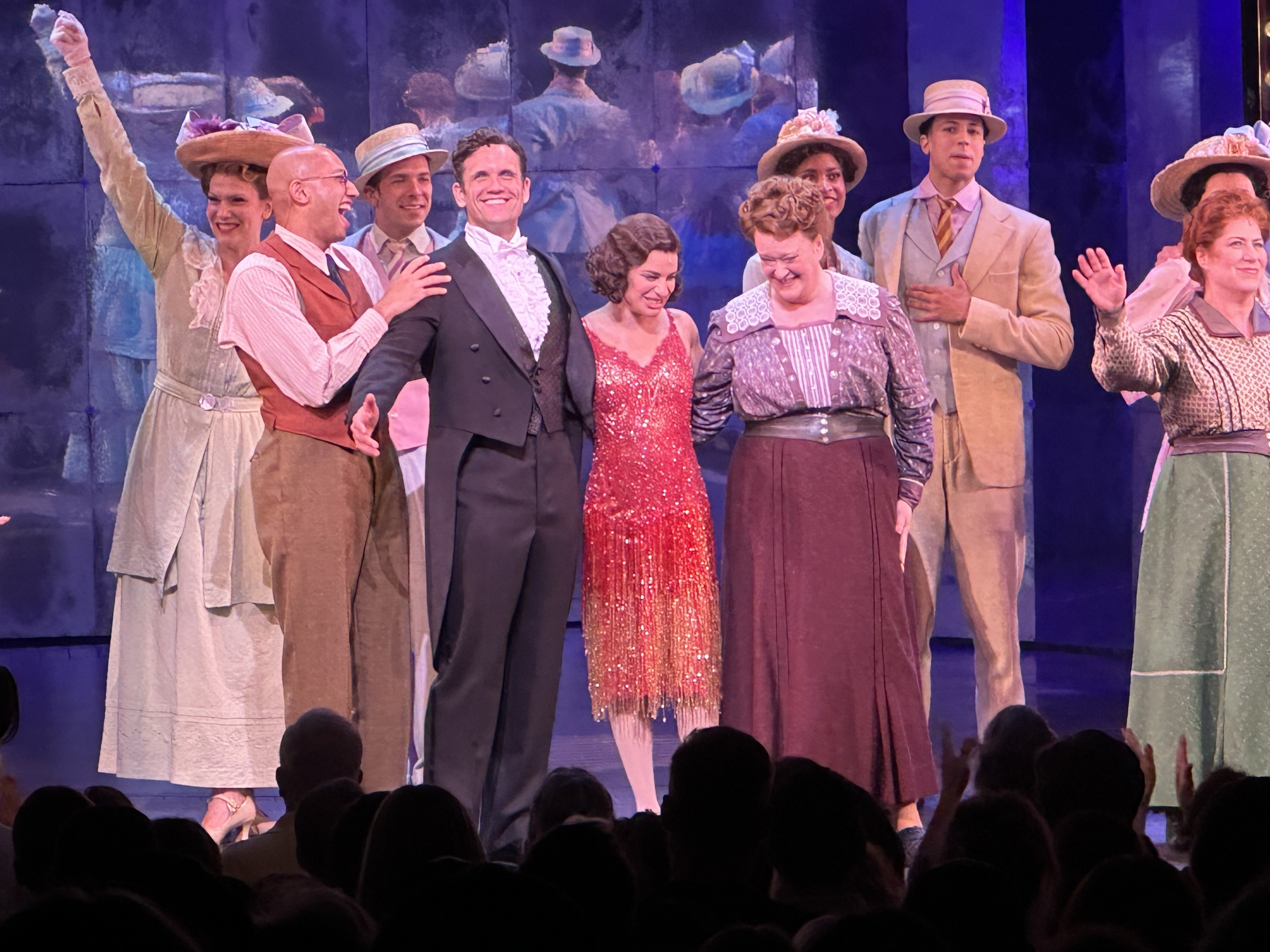
Cast of Funny Girl, including Lea Michele, after a show on Broadway in July 2023

A revival production began Broadway previews on March 26, 2022, at the August Wilson Theatre with an official opening on April 24, 2022, starring Beanie Feldstein as Fanny Brice, directed by Michael Mayer, music directed by Michael Rafter, with a revised book by Harvey Fierstein. The production also starred Ramin Karimloo as Nick Arnstein, Jared Grimes as Eddie Ryan, and Jane Lynch as Mrs. Brice. The production received mostly negative reviews from critics, though Grimes received a Tony Award nomination for Best Featured Actor in a Musical. On July 10, 2022, Feldstein announced that she would depart the production at the end of the month, instead of September as previously planned; the following day, the production confirmed that Lea Michele and Tovah Feldshuh would replace Feldstein and Lynch respectively from September 6, with Julie Benko as Fanny in the interim. On August 9, 2022, Lynch announced that she would depart the production on August 14 instead of the previously planned date in September and that standby Liz McCartney would play the role of Mrs. Brice until Feldshuh began her run. On March 28, 2023, Paolo Montalban and Anne L. Nathan replaced Peter Francis James and Toni DiBuono as Florenz Ziegfeld and Mrs. Strakosh, respectively. From June 27 to July 16, Stephen Mark Lukas played Nick Arnstein when Karimloo went to Italy to star in The Phantom of the Opera.

Producers announced in March 2023 that the show would close September 3 after 599 performances. The production successfully recouped its $16.5M capitalization.

Lea Michele assuming the role of Fanny Brice parallels her Glee character storyline, where Rachel Berry lands her dream role in Broadway's (fictional) first revival of Funny Girl. Michele's performance turned declining box office numbers around and received critical acclaim in the role with universally positive reviews, including many citing superior vocals compared to her predecessor.

=== Other productions ===
On September 23, 2002, a concert version for the benefit of the Actors' Fund was staged in New York City at the New Amsterdam Theatre. Performers included Carolee Carmello, Kristin Chenoweth, Sutton Foster, Ana Gasteyer, Whoopi Goldberg, Jane Krakowski, Judy Kuhn, Julia Murney, LaChanze, Ricki Lake, Andrea Martin, Idina Menzel, Bebe Neuwirth, Kaye Ballard, Alice Playten, Lillias White, Len Cariou, Jason Danieley, Peter Gallagher, Gary Beach, Brad Oscar, Richard Kind, and The Rockettes.

In regional theatre the Paper Mill Playhouse, Millburn, New Jersey, production ran in April to May 2001 with Leslie Kritzer and Robert Cuccioli. The New York Times reviewer noted: "What makes it all the more impressive is that few actors, or theater companies outside of summer stock, dare to attempt Jule Styne's and Bob Merrill's grand spectacle that propelled Barbra Streisand's career nearly 40 years ago." The Westchester Broadway Theatre production ran from March to June 2009, with Jill Abramovitz as Fanny. The production at Drury Lane Oakbrook ran from December 2009 to March 7, 2010. Gary Griffin was the co-director with Drury Lane artistic director William Osetek, with the cast that featured Sara Sheperd.

A revival directed by Bartlett Sher had been announced to premiere at the Ahmanson Theatre in Los Angeles in January 2012 with Lauren Ambrose starring as Fanny Brice and Bobby Cannavale as Nick Arnstein, and then open on Broadway in April 2012. However, on November 3, 2011, producer Bob Boyett announced that this production has been postponed. He said "We have made the extremely difficult decision today to postpone our production of Funny Girl. Given the current economic climate, many Broadway producing investors have found it impossible to maintain their standard level of financial commitment."

The first lavish Israeli production of the musical premiered in 2016, 52 years after the original Broadway premiere. There was a controversy about the casting for the role of Fanny Brice. The role was promised for actress Tali Oren, who was a freelanced actress, but then the role was offered to Mia Dagan who was signed with Beit Lessin Theatre. Dagan, who jumped on the opportunity in the first minute, took the role and signed off the contract with Beit Lessin. The production also included Amos Tamam as Nick Arnstein.

== Synopsis ==
The musical is set in and around New York City just before and following World War I. Ziegfeld Follies star Fanny Brice, awaiting the return of her husband Nicky Arnstein from prison, reflects on their life together, and their story is told as a flashback.

=== Original Broadway version ===
Act 1

Fanny is a stage-struck teen who gets her first job in vaudeville. Her mother and her mother’s friend Mrs. Strakosh try to dissuade her from show business because Fanny is not the typical beauty ("If a Girl Isn't Pretty"). But Fanny perseveres ("I'm the Greatest Star") and is helped and encouraged by Eddie Ryan, a dancer she meets in the vaudeville shows. Once Fanny's career takes off, Eddie and Mrs. Brice lament that once she's on Broadway she'll forget about them ("Who Taught Her Everything?"). Fanny performs a supposedly romantic number in the Follies, but she turns it into a classic comic routine, ending the number as a pregnant bride ("His Love Makes Me Beautiful"), causing an uproar.

She meets the sophisticated and handsome Nick Arnstein, who accompanies Fanny to her mother's opening night party on "Henry Street". Fanny is clearly falling in love with Nick, while acknowledging their complex vulnerabilities ("People"). Later they meet in Baltimore and have a private dinner at a swanky restaurant and declare their feelings ("You Are Woman, I Am Man"). Fanny is determined to marry Nick, regardless of his gambling past ("Don't Rain on My Parade").

Act 2

The two marry, move to a mansion on Long Island, and have a daughter, Frances ("Sadie, Sadie"). In the meantime, Mrs. Strakosh and Eddie suggest to Mrs. Brice that she should find a man to marry, now that her daughter is supporting her ("Find Yourself a Man"). Fanny has become a major star with the Ziegfeld Follies ("Rat-Tat-Tat-Tat"). Nick asks Ziegfeld to invest in a gambling casino, but although Ziegfeld passes, Fanny insists on investing. When the venture fails and they lose their money, Fanny tries to make light of it, which propels Nick to get involved in a shady bond deal, resulting in his arrest for embezzlement. Fanny feels helpless but stronger than ever in her love for him ("The Music That Makes Me Dance").

In the present, Fanny is waiting for Nick to arrive and has time to reflect on her situation. Nick arrives, newly released from prison, and he and Fanny decide to separate. She is heartbroken, but resolves to pick up her life again ("Don't Rain on My Parade (Reprise)").

=== 2022 Broadway revival ===
Act 1

In the present, Fanny Brice sits in her dressing room whilst preparing to star in the Ziegfeld Follies, awaiting news to hear if her husband, Nicky Arnstein, has been freed from prison and reminiscing on her earlier life ("Who Are You Now?") In the past, Fanny is a stage-struck teen, though her mother and her mother’s friends Mrs. Strakosh and Mrs. Meeker try to dissuade her from show business because Fanny is not the typical beauty ("If a Girl Isn't Pretty"). This is proved true when at her first vaudeville job as a chorus dancer, she is fired by the theater's owner, Tom Keeney. She confides to her friend Eddie Ryan, who got her the job, that she knows she will succeed ("I'm the Greatest Star"). Later, rehearsing with Eddie to re-audition for Keeney, Mrs. Brice echos Fanny's point ("I'm the Greatest Star (Reprise)") and Fanny revolves to audition again for Keeney. After "Eddie's Tap," Fanny nervously performs her first number "Cornet Man," though eventually, she wins over the audience and the attention of handsome gambler, Nicky Arnstein, who is able to wager Keeney a higher pay for Fanny and gives her his card.

A year later, Fanny receives a telegram from Florenz Ziegfeld Jr. asking her to meet him at his theater, which Fanny proposes is connected to her interaction with Nick. At the theater, Fanny argues with Ziegfeld over his song choice for her but is forced to perform the song. However, she turns the supposedly romantic number, "His Love Makes Me Beautiful," into a comedy in which she portrays a pregnant bride. Backstage, Fanny's family and friends are thrilled but Ziegfeld reprimands her to which she apologizes, though he admits he found the act funny. Nick appears backstage, congratulating Fanny on her performance, and escorts her home ("I Wanna Be Seen With You Tonight") where her mother and close friends have thrown her a party, celebrating her success ("Henry Street"). Later in the evening, Fanny opens up to Nick about her desire to find love ("People"), and Nick admits that he would initiate a relationship between them, but acknowledges that he is leaving New York the next day.

Sometime later, Fanny is touring with the follies and she and Nick both find themselves in Baltimore. Nick brings her to dinner at a fancy establishment, where she panics in response to his somewhat rapid advances, though she eventually gives in ("You Are Woman, I Am Man"). Later, the follies company is preparing to leave Cleveland and Fanny and Nick appear arm in arm. However, he tells her he will not be following the company, as he has to win back his money in Monte Carlo. He tells her he loves her but when she asks him to marry her, he insists that they cannot wed until he is rich again. In a last minute decision, she decides that she needs to follow him in pursuit of marriage, no matter what it means for her career ("Don't Rain on my Parade").

Act 2

Fanny surprises Nick in Monte Carlo ("Entr'acte"/"Don't Rain on my Parade (Reprise)"). He tells her that he has won back his wealth and the two are married and move to a mansion on Long Island, with Fanny soon revealing that she is pregnant ("Sadie, Sadie"). Back on Henry Street ("Sadie, Sadie (Playoff)"), Mrs. Brice and Eddie lament that Fanny no longer needs them ("Who Taught Her Everything She Knows?"). A few months later, as Fanny prepares to go back to rehearsals for a new show, Nick abruptly tells her that he is heading to Philadelphia to find investors for a casino he's building in Miami. Fanny reacts badly, nervous about leaving their daughter, Frances, for a whole day, though Nick promises that he will only be gone for a day, but in the end, she convinces him to stay and she is welcomed back to the theater ("You Are Woman (Reprise)"/"Henry Street (Reprise)"). Nick follows her to the theater and attempts to convince Ziegfeld to invest in his project, but Ziegfeld dismisses him. In response, Fanny decides to invest $68,000 of her money into Nick's project. Over the next few days, Nick travels to Florida and enters in a series of business deals with Fanny's money ("Temporary Arrangement").

On Fanny's opening night for her new show, she anxiously waits Nick's arrival, who is still traveling, telling Eddie that this would be the first opening night of hers he has missed. After her performance ("Rat-Tat-Tat-Tat"), Fanny's mother comforts her before Nick appears in her dressing room, revealing that a hurricane in Florida has destroyed the casino and lost them their money. She assures him that they will rebuild their success and that the most important thing to her is him ("Who Are You Now? (Reprise)"/"People (Reprise)"). The following year, Nick is involved in a business proposal to become a partner at a talent agency without putting up any money, though he sees through the act and realizes that Fanny has put up the money on their behalf. Nick reacts badly, insisting that he does not need her help to succeed and calls about a mob deal he was informed about, agreeing to join the deal in exchange for $68,000 ("You're a Funny Girl/Beekman Call"). Back at the follies, Fanny prepares a new routine ("What Do Happy People Do?"), but her mother arrives to inform her that Nick has been arrested for embezzlement. When Fanny insists that Nick couldn't have known the deal was faulty, her mother calls her out for making him feel unimportant in her life. Alone, Fanny reflects on how important he is to her ("The Music That Makes Me Dance").

Flashing back to the present, ("Dream Ballet"), three years after the arrest, Fanny and Eddie share one last tender moment as Nick appears in the doorway. She insists that she's willing to change to make their relationship better but he abruptly asks her for a divorce. She is taken aback but thanks him for making her feel "almost, sorta...beautiful." He assures her that she is beautiful, then leaves. Fanny somberly reflects on their marriage ("Funny Girl") but as she is called to the stage, she resolves to start again, stating "That's life in the theatre!" ("Don't Rain on my Parade (Reprise II)").

== Cast ==
Character	Broadway	First US National Tour	West End	Australia	Second US National Tour	West End Revival	Paris	Broadway Revival	Third US National Tour
Character	1964	1965	1966		1996	2016	2019	2022	2023
Fanny Brice	Barbra Streisand	Marilyn Michaels	Barbra Streisand	Jill Perryman	Debbie Gibson	Sheridan Smith	Christina Bianco	Beanie Feldstein	Katerina McCrimmon
Nicky Arnstein	Sydney Chaplin	Anthony George	Michael Craig	Bruce Barry	Robert Westenberg	Darius Campbell	Ashley Day	Ramin Karimloo	Stephen Mark Lukas
Mrs. Brice	Kay Medford	Lillian Roth	Kay Medford	Evie Hayes	Barbara Spiegel	Marilyn Cutts	Rachel Stanley	Jane Lynch	Melissa Manchester
Eddie Ryan	Danny Meehan	Danny Carroll	Lee Allen	Bill Yule	Jonathan Brody	Joel Montague	Matthew Jeans	Jared Grimes	Izaiah Montaque Harris
Florenz Ziegfeld Jr.	Roger DeKoven	Richard Buck	Ronald Leigh-Hunt	Walter Sullivan	Casper Roos	Bruce Montague	Mark Inscoe	Peter Francis James	Walter Coppage
Mrs. Strakosh	Jean Stapleton	Dena Dietrich	Stella Moray	Margaret Christensen	Mamie Bensinger	Gay Soper	Shirley Jameson	Toni DiBuono	Eileen T'Kaye
Emma	Royce Wallace	Isabel Sanford	Isabelle Lucas	Tessa Mallos	—N/a	Natasha J. Barnes	—N/a	Ephie Aardema	Leah Platt
Tom Keeney	Joseph Macauley	Sam Kressen	Jack Cunningham	Will Mahoney	William Linton	Maurice Lane	Ashley Knight	Martin Moran	David Foley, Jr.
Mrs. Meeker	Lydia Fredericks	Carole Love	Frances Wells Robertson	Lesley Baker	Debra Cardona	Valda Aviks	—N/a	Debra Cardona	Christine Bunuan
Ziegfeld Tenor	John Lankston	Ray Rocknak	David Wheldon Williams	Gil Dalzell	Jack Doyle	Philip Bertioli	—N/a	Daniel Beeman	Jackson Grove

=== Notable replacements ===
Broadway (1964–66)

- Fanny Brice: Mimi Hines, Lainie Kazan (s/b)
- Nick Arnstein: Johnny Desmond

First National Tour (1965–66)

- Mrs. Brice: Dena Dietrich (u/s)

Broadway revival (2022–23)

- Fanny Brice: Julie Benko, Lea Michele
- Nick Arnstein: Stephen Mark Lukas
- Mrs. Brice: Tovah Feldshuh
- Florenz Ziegfeld: Paolo Montalban
- Mrs. Strakosh: Anne L. Nathan
- Tom Keeney: Michael Mastro

== Musical numbers ==
Numerous songs were tried and cut during the show's initial development.

=== Original production ===
Act I

- "Overture" – Orchestra
- "If a Girl Isn't Pretty" – Mrs. Strakosh, Mrs. Brice, Eddie Ryan and People
- "I'm the Greatest Star" – Fanny Brice
- "Cornet Man" – Fanny Brice, Snub Taylor and Keeney Chorus
- "Who Taught Her Everything?" – Mrs. Brice and Eddie Ryan
- "His Love Makes Me Beautiful" – Ziegfeld Tenor, Ziegfeld Girls and Fanny Brice
- "I Want to Be Seen with You Tonight" – Nick Arnstein and Fanny Brice
- "Henry Street" – Henry Street Neighbors
- "People" – Fanny Brice
- "You Are Woman" – Nick Arnstein and Fanny Brice
- "Don't Rain on My Parade" – Fanny Brice

Act II

- "Sadie, Sadie" – Fanny Brice and Friends
- "Find Yourself a Man" – Mrs. Strakosh, Mrs. Brice and Eddie Ryan
- "Rat-Tat-Tat-Tat" – Ziegfeld Company and Fanny Brice
- "Who Are You Now?" – Fanny Brice
- "The Music That Makes Me Dance" – Fanny Brice
- "Don't Rain on My Parade" (Reprise) – Fanny Brice

=== West End revival (2016) ===
Act I

- "Overture" – Orchestra
- "If a Girl Isn't Pretty" – Mrs. Brice, Mrs. Meeker, Mrs. Strakosh, Mr. Keeney, Eddie Ryan and Keeney Company
- "I'm the Greatest Star" – Fanny Brice
- "I'm the Greatest Star (Reprise)" – Mrs. Brice and Fanny Brice†
- "Cornet Man" – Fanny Brice and Keeney Company
- "His Love Makes Me Beautiful" – Ziegfeld Tenor, Fanny Brice and Ziegfeld Company
- "I Want to Be Seen with You Tonight" – Nick Arnstein and Fanny Brice
- "Henry Street" – Mrs. Meeker, Mrs. Brice, Mrs Strakosh and Henry Street Neighbors
- "People" – Fanny Brice
- "You Are Woman" – Nick Arnstein and Fanny Brice
- "Don't Rain on My Parade" – Fanny Brice

Act II

- "Entr'acte" – Orchestra†
- "Don't Rain on My Parade (Reprise I)" – Fanny Brice†
- "Sadie, Sadie" – Fanny Brice and Friends
- "Who Taught Her Everything She Knows?" – Eddie Ryan and Mrs. Brice
- "Temporary Arrangement" – Nick Arnstein and Businessmen
- "Rat-Tat-Tat-Tat" – Fanny Brice and Ziegfeld Company
- "Who Are You Now? / People (Reprise)" – Fanny Brice and Nick Arnstein
- "The Music That Makes Me Dance / Dream Ballet" – Fanny Brice
- "Funny Girl / Don't Rain On My Parade (Reprise II)" – Fanny Brice
- "Bows / People (Reprise II)" – Full Company†

=== Broadway revival (2022) ===
Act I

- "Overture" – Orchestra
- "Who Are You Now?" – Fanny Brice
- "If a Girl Isn't Pretty" – Mrs. Brice, Mrs. Meeker, Mrs. Strakosh, Mr. Keeney, Eddie Ryan and Keeney Company
- "I'm the Greatest Star" – Fanny Brice
- "I'm the Greatest Star (Reprise)" – Mrs. Brice and Fanny Brice†
- "Eddie's Tap" – Orchestra
- "Cornet Man" – Fanny Brice and Cornet Men
- "His Love Makes Me Beautiful" – Ziegfeld Tenor, Fanny Brice, and Ensemble
- "I Want to Be Seen with You Tonight" – Nick Arnstein and Fanny Brice
- "Henry Street" – Company
- "People" – Fanny Brice
- "You Are Woman" – Nick Arnstein and Fanny Brice
- "Don't Rain on My Parade" – Fanny Brice

Act II

- "Entr'acte" – Orchestra†
- "Don't Rain on My Parade (Reprise)" – Fanny Brice†
- "Sadie, Sadie" – Fanny Brice and Company
- "Sadie, Sadie (Playoff)" – Mrs. Brice, Mrs. Meeker, and Mrs. Strakosh†
- "Who Taught Her Everything?" – Mrs. Brice and Eddie Ryan
- "You Are Woman, I Am Man (Reprise) / Henry Street (Reprise)" – Nick Arnstein and Follies Girls†
- "Temporary Arrangement" – Nick Arnstein and Men
- "Rat-Tat-Tat-Tat" – Fanny Brice and Ensemble
- "Who Are You Now? (Reprise) / People (Reprise)" – Fanny Brice and Nick Arnstein
- "You're a Funny Girl / Beekman Call" – Nick Arnstein
- "What Do Happy People Do?" – Follies Girls
- "The Music That Makes Me Dance" – Fanny Brice
- "Dream Ballet" – Orchestra
- "Funny Girl / Don't Rain On My Parade (Reprise II)" – Fanny Brice
- "Bows / People (Reprise II)" – Company†

† = Not included on the cast recording

== Cast recordings ==
The cast album was released on Capitol Records when Streisand's label Columbia Records declined to produce the recording. It peaked at No. 2 on the Billboard 200 and achieved gold record status. The recording was issued on CD in 1987 on Capitol and then in 1992 on EMI's Broadway Angel label. The album received a commemorative 50th anniversary box set edition, released April 29, 2014, with an LP, remastered CD, and 48-page book of photographs from the original Broadway production.

A cast recording of the West End revival starring Sheridan Smith was released on August 5, 2016. A new Broadway cast recording with Lea Michele was digitally released November 18, 2022. Michele and the cast received praise for their vocals, and the album topped the Billboard Cast Albums Chart.

== Awards and nominations ==
=== Broadway debut ===
Year	Award	Category	Nominee	Result
1964	Tony Award	Best Musical		Nominated
1964	Tony Award	Best Actor in a Musical	Sydney Chaplin	Nominated
1964	Tony Award	Best Actress in a Musical	Barbra Streisand	Nominated
1964	Tony Award	Best by a Featured Actor in a Musical	Danny Meehan	Nominated
1964	Tony Award	Best Featured Actress in a Musical	Kay Medford	Nominated
1964	Tony Award	Best Choreography	Carol Haney	Nominated
1964	Tony Award	Best Composer and Lyricist	Jule Styne and Bob Merrill	Nominated
1964	Tony Award	Best Producer of a Musical	Ray Stark	Nominated

=== 2016 West End revival ===
Year	Award	Category	Nominee	Result
2016	Evening Standard Theatre Award	Best Musical Performance	Sheridan Smith	Nominated
2017	Whatsonstage.com Awards	Best Musical Revival		Won
2017	Whatsonstage.com Awards	Best Actress in a Musical	Sheridan Smith	Nominated
2017	Whatsonstage.com Awards	Best Supporting Actor in a Musical	Joel Montague	Nominated
2017	Whatsonstage.com Awards	Best Direction	Michael Mayer	Nominated
2017	Whatsonstage.com Awards	Best Costume Design	Matthew Wright	Nominated
2017	Laurence Olivier Award	Best Musical Revival		Nominated
2017	Laurence Olivier Award	Best Actress in a Musical	Sheridan Smith	Nominated

=== 2022 Broadway revival ===
Year	Award	Category	Nominee	Result
2022	Tony Awards	Best Featured Actor in a Musical	Jared Grimes	Nominated
2022	Drama Desk Awards	Outstanding Featured Actor in a Musical	Jared Grimes	Nominated
2022	Drama Desk Awards	Outstanding Choreography	Ayodele Casel	Nominated
2022	Drama Desk Awards	Outstanding Costume Design for a Musical	Susan Hilferty	Nominated
2022	Drama League Awards	Outstanding Revival of a Musical		Nominated
2022	Drama League Awards	Outstanding Direction of a Musical	Michael Mayer	Nominated
2022	Drama League Awards	Distinguished Performance	Beanie Feldstein	Nominated
2022	Drama League Awards	Distinguished Performance	Jane Lynch	Nominated
2022	Chita Rivera Awards	Outstanding Male Dancer in a Broadway Show	Jared Grimes	Won
2023	Theatre World Award	Dorothy Loudon Award for Excellence in the Theater	Julie Benko	Honored

== Film adaptation ==
The namesake 1968 screen adaptation directed by William Wyler paired Streisand with Omar Sharif in the role of Arnstein. Medford repeated her stage role, and Walter Pidgeon was cast as Flo Ziegfeld. The film earned Streisand the Academy Award for Best Actress as well as the Golden Globe. The film was nominated for various awards, including the Academy Award for Best Picture, and became the top-grossing film of 1968.

The sequel Funny Lady was released in 1975, with Herbert Ross directing and Streisand and Sharif reprising their roles. The film received mixed to negative reviews from critics, but it was the eighth-highest grossing film of 1975.
