= Walnut Street Commercial Historic District =

Historic district in Missouri, United States

- U.S. National Register of Historic Places
- U.S. Historic district
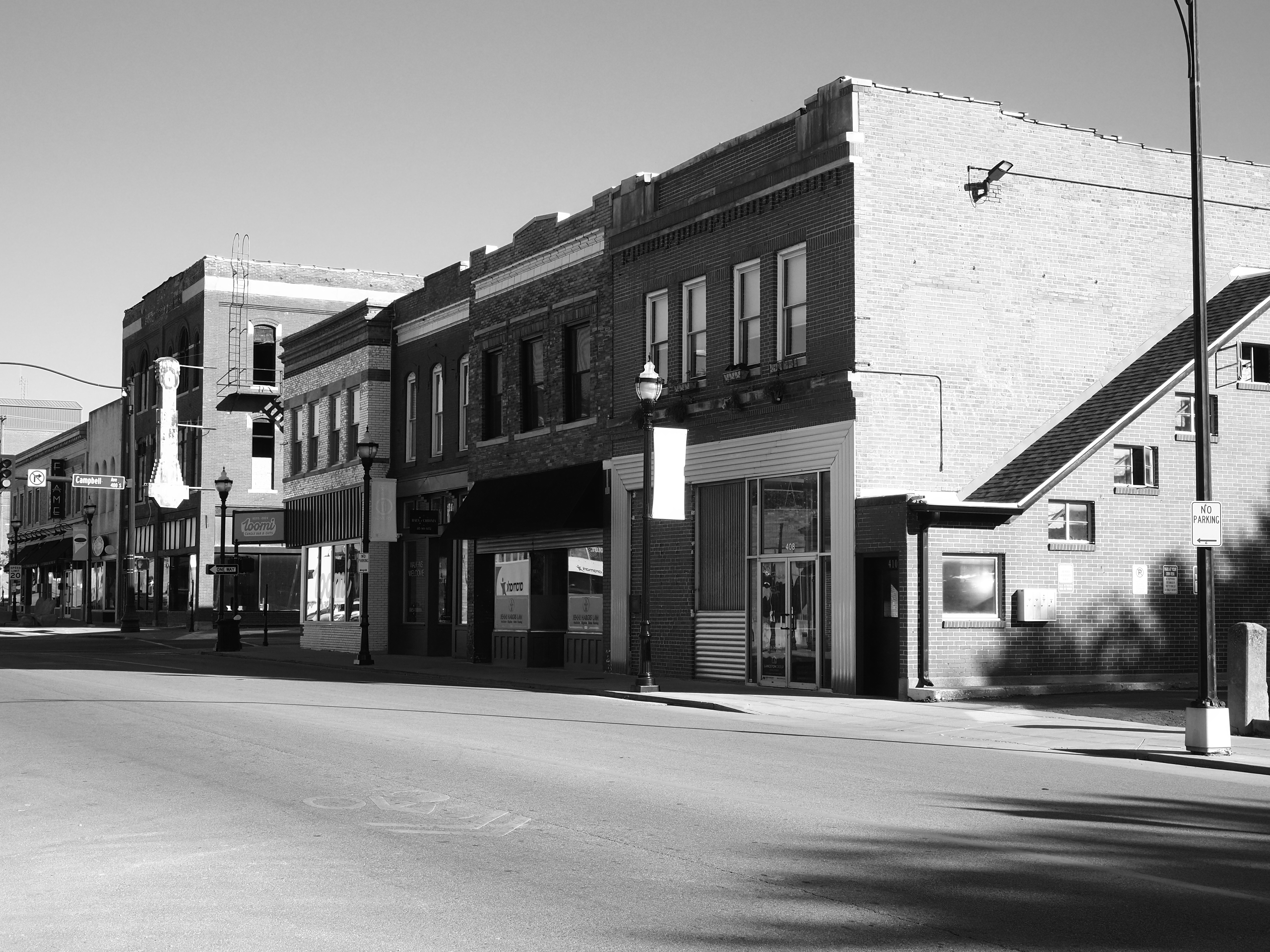

- Location within Missouri Location within the United States
- Location: Walnut St., Springfield, Missouri
- Coordinates: 37°12′26″N 93°17′27″W
- Area: less than one acre
- Built: 1895
- Architect: Boller, Carl
- Architectural style: Italianate, Colonial Revival, et al.
- MPS: Springfield MPS
- NRHP reference No.: 99000717
- Added to NRHP: June 25, 1999

Walnut Street Commercial Historic District is a national historic district located at Springfield, Greene County, Missouri. The district encompasses seven contributing buildings in a commercial section of Springfield. The district developed between about 1895 and 1949, and includes representative examples of Italianate and Colonial Revival style architecture. Located in the district is the separately listed Landers Theater. Other notable buildings include the Masonic Temple (1906).

It was added to the National Register of Historic Places in 1999.
