= Evan McGill =

American theatre producer

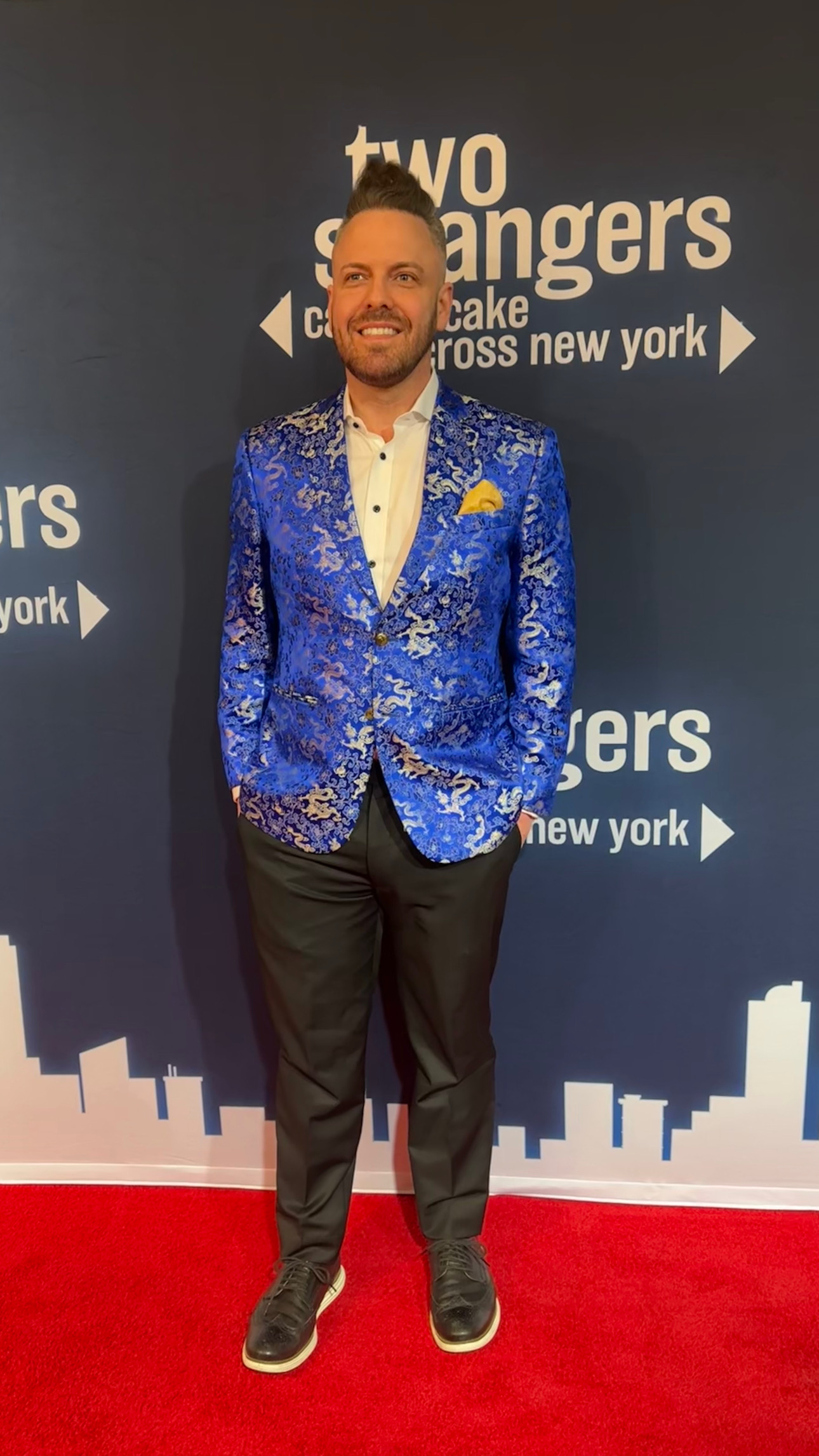
- McGill in 2025
- Born: Wrentham, Massachusetts
- Education: University of Miami
- Occupation: Theatrical producer
- Years active: 2021–present
- Awards: Tony Award (2023-2025), Drama Desk Award (2023)
- Website: http://www.evanmcgill.com

Evan McGill is an American Tony Award and Drama Desk Award-winning theatre producer and music producer recognized for his contributions to several Broadway productions and cast albums. He is the founder of Evan McGill Productions.

== Early life ==
McGill is a native of Wrentham, Massachusetts. His grandmother took him to productions such as Oliver! and Fiddler on the Roof at local theater companies near her home in Marblehead, Massachusetts. His interests differed from those of his peers, leaning more towards what adults were engaged in. In an effort to spark his enthusiasm, his mother enrolled him in theater classes. Starting at age 6 and throughout his childhood, he was actively involved in theater, performing in local productions such as Tom Sawyer, Alice in Wonderland, and a touring production of Hansel and Gretel with the Mansfield, Massachusetts-based Un-Common Theatre Company. He graduated from King Philip Regional High School in 2002. At King Philip, he played football and was a member of DECA, where he was a state champion. He went on to graduate from the University of Miami in 2006. In 2012, McGill relocated to Kansas City to work for a medical device company called Knit-Rite. Over the years, he transitioned into an ownership role within the company. Subsequently, he rekindled his passion for attending live performances. He began yearly visits to New York City to see various productions, gradually increasing from one weekend to two to three. This reignited his passion for theater, prompting him to proactively reach out to different producers to become involved with producing new works. After Knit-Rite was sold to Thuasne in December 2020, he decided to pursue a career in the industry.

== Theater career ==
McGill has participated in numerous Broadway shows, such as Mr. Saturday Night, Kimberly Akimbo, Parade (2023), The Sign in Sidney Brustein's Window (2023), The Outsiders, Sunset Boulevard (2024) and Two Strangers (Carry a Cake Across New York). Additionally, he has overseen the production of several Broadway cast albums, including The Music Man (The 2022 Broadway Cast Recording) with Hugh Jackman and Sutton Foster, as well as Funny Girl (New Broadway Cast Recording) with Lea Michele. Both albums achieved the top position on the Billboard Cast Albums chart.

=== Cast albums ===
Year	Title	Credited As	Reference
2022	The Music Man (The 2022 Broadway Cast Recording)	Co-Producer	
2022	Funny Girl (New Broadway Cast Recording)	Executive Producer	
2023	Guys and Dolls (The 2023 London Cast Recording)	Executive Producer	

== Television ==
McGill is the creator of Broadway Bound: The Search For Broadway's Next Star, an international television format centered on musical theater performance. The series features contestants competing through a series of challenges in singing, dancing, and acting for the opportunity to originate a leading role in a fully produced stage musical in their home market. The project is being developed in collaboration with Diamond Moving Pictures.

Designed as a scalable global format, Broadway Bound is intended for rollout across multiple territories, including the United States, the United Kingdom, the Philippines, and South Korea. The format incorporates industry judges and rotating mentors, including directors, choreographers, and professional performers, and aims to identify emerging talent while expanding the audience for musical theater through broadcast and digital platforms.

== Awards ==
On May 2, 2023, McGill received two Tony Award nominations for his role as a co-producer of Parade and The Sign In Sidney Brustein's Window, respectively nominated for Best Revival of a Musical and Best Revival of a Play. At the 76th Tony Awards, he won for Parade. In June 2023, he received a Drama Desk Award for Outstanding Revival of a Musical for Parade. At the 77th Tony Awards, he received a Tony Award for Best Musical for The Outsiders (in partnership with Tanninger Entertainment). At the 78th Tony Awards, he received a Tony Award for Best Revival of a Musical for Sunset Boulevard.

== Personal life ==
McGill is Jewish and many of his productions focus on Jewish characters and Jewish themes. He graduated with his Master of Business Administration in 2014 from Columbus State University. The university presented him the Young Alumni Award in 2023.
