= Funny Girl (New Broadway Cast Recording) =

2022 cast recording by various artists

Cast recording by Lea Michele / various artists
- Released: November 18, 2022
- Studio: Power Station
- Genre: Pop
- Label: Gemini; Accidental Jacket; Sony
- Producer: Evan McGill

Lea Michele chronology
Forever (2021)	Funny Girl (New Broadway Cast Recording) (2022)

Funny Girl (New Broadway Cast Recording) is the cast recording for the 2022 Broadway revival of the musical of the same name, starring Lea Michele. Released digitally on November 18, 2022, the album's physical release followed January 20, 2023, on the Sony Masterworks Broadway label. The album reached number one on the US Billboard Cast Albums chart.

== Production ==
Recording for a new Funny Girl album started at Power Station Studios in Manhattan during fall 2022, produced by Gemini Theatricals, Accidental Jacket, and Masterworks Broadway. In a surprise announcement at a performance of Funny Girl on November 16, 2022, Lea Michele announced the release of the album; the announcement was live streamed on Instagram. The release would be the first Broadway cast recording since the original cast recording which was released 58 years prior. The album was released on November 18, 2022, digitally, while a physical CD version was released on January 20, 2023.

Although Beanie Feldstein opened the Broadway revival as Fanny Brice, she is notably absent from the Funny Girl recording.

== Tracklist ==
No.	Title	Performer(s)	Length
1.	"Overture"	Orchestra	4:12
2.	"Who Are You Now?"	Lea Michele	0:52
3.	"If a Girl Isn't Pretty"	Tovah Feldshuh; Jared Grimes; Cast	3:41
4.	"I'm the Greatest Star"	Michele	3:32
5.	"Eddie's Tap"	Grimes	1:54
6.	"Cornet Man"	Michele; Cast	2:23
7.	"His Love Makes Me Beautiful"	Michele; Daniel Beeman; Cast	4:41
8.	"I Want to Be Seen with You"	Michele; Ramin Karimloo	2:05
9.	"Henry Street"	Feldshuh; Grimes; Cast	2:39
10.	"People"	Michele	3:37
11.	"You Are Woman, I Am Man"	Michele; Karimloo	3:13
12.	"Don't Rain On My Parade"	Michele	2:38
13.	"Sadie, Sadie"	Michele; Karimloo; Cast	4:08
14.	"Who Taught Her Everything She Knows?"	Feldshuh; Grimes	3:02
15.	"Temporary Arrangement"	Karimloo; Cast	2:46
16.	"Rat-Tat-Tat-Tat"	Michele; Cast	5:12
17.	"Who Are You Now? - Reprise"	Michele; Karimloo	4:17
18.	"You're A Funny Girl / Beekman Call"	Karimloo	2:02
19.	"What Do Happy People Do?"	Cast	0:48
20.	"The Music That Makes Me Dance"	Michele	3:02
21.	"Dream Ballet"	Orchestra	1:48
22.	"Finale Act 2"	Michele	4:42

== Charts ==
Chart	Peak position
US Billboard Cast Albums	1
