= Tarzan in Manhattan =

- DVD cover
- Genre: Action; Adventure
- Written by: Anna Sandor; William Gough based on characters created by Edgar Rice Burroughs
- Directed by: Michael Schultz
- Starring: Joe Lara; Kim Crosby; Tony Curtis; Jan-Michael Vincent
- Music by: Charles Fox
- Country of origin: United States
- Original language: English

Production
- Executive producers: Max A. Keller; Micheline H. Keller
- Producers: Charles Hairston; Max A. Keller; Micheline H. Keller
- Production locations: New York City; Hawaii; The Burbank Studios
- Cinematography: Laszlo George
- Editor: Dann Cahn
- Running time: 94 minutes
- Production company: American First Run Studios

Original release
- Network: CBS
- Release: April 15, 1989

Tarzan in Manhattan is a 1989 action adventure CBS television film. Joe Lara portrays Tarzan, and Kim Crosby appears as Jane Porter. Tony Curtis and Jan-Michael Vincent co-star. The telefilm was produced by Max A. Keller, Micheline H. Keller and Gina Scheerer, written by Anna Sandor and William Gough (based on characters created by Edgar Rice Burroughs), and directed by Michael Schultz. It aired on April 15, 1989.

Lara also later starred in Tarzan: The Epic Adventures, an otherwise unrelated interpretation of the character.

== Plot ==
Tarzan leaves Africa and goes to present-day New York City to seek vengeance for the murder of his Ape mother Kala, and to rescue a chimp, Cheeta who had been taken by hunters working for B. B. Brightmore and his Brightmore Foundation. Soon Tarzan discovers this supposed philanthropic organization is conducting illegal tests on animal brains in an effort to transfer the thoughts and knowledge of one creature to another, and he sets out to rescue the animals and expose Brightmore. He is aided by Jane Porter (a cab driver) and her father, Archimedes "Archie" Porter, a retired police officer, now the head of his own security agency.

With Brightmore's operations shut down, Jane joins her father's security agency, and both talk Tarzan into coming on board at minimum wage, but with all the bananas Cheeta can eat.

== Cast ==
- Joe Lara as Tarzan, Jane's love interest.
- Kim Crosby as Jane Porter, Tarzan's ally and love interest.
- Tony Curtis as Archimedes "Archie" Porter, Jane's father.
- Jan-Michael Vincent as Brightmore, villain who kidnaps animals for illicit research.
- Joe Seneca as Joseph, An African storekeeper, and Tarzan's friend and mentor.
- Sloan Fischer as Some Man

=== Soundtrack ===
Warren Zevon's "Leave My Monkey Alone" plays on the soundtrack as Tarzan's plane flies over prominent New York landmarks. Also, Grace Jones's "Pull Up to the Bumper" plays on the soundtrack in Jane's taxicab.

| Preceded by Tarzan, Lord of the Jungle; 1976–1980 | Tarzan in Manhattan; Tarzan in Manhattan; April 15, 1989 | Succeeded by Tarzán; 1991–1994 |
