= William Brice =

American artist (1921–2008)

- Born: April 23, 1921; New York City, U.S.
- Died: March 3, 2008 (aged 86); California, U.S.
- Known for: Abstract expressionism, Painting
- Spouse: Shirley Bardeen (m. 1942)

William Arnstein, professionally William Brice (April 23, 1921 – March 3, 2008) was an American artist known for his large-scale abstract paintings.

Born to actress Fanny Brice and her second husband, professional gambler Julius W. "Nicky" Arnstein, April 23, 1921, he spent his early years living with his mother and his sister, Frances (later the wife of producer Ray Stark), while their father was in prison on a variety of charges stemming from a history of thefts, swindles, and confidence schemes. Artists such as Clifford Odets and the Gershwin brothers were frequent visitors.

William's talent was recognized early, and even in childhood, he had the services of a private art tutor. Important influences included then-active artists Henri Matisse and Pablo Picasso (one of whose works Brice acquired at the age of fourteen).

Their mother, pursuing a career in radio, moved them to Beverly Hills. There he attended the Chouinard Art Institute in Los Angeles (1937–39, 1940–42), as well as the Art Students League of New York in New York City (1939–40). His first solo show of paintings and drawings was presented at the Santa Barbara Museum of Art in 1947. The early work was figural and representational. A 1950 L.A. Times review of his solo exhibition at the Frank Perls Gallery (Beverly Hills) praises the still lifes "that stress the geometrical aspects of common objects." Over time, he moved in the direction of greater abstraction, but rejected more progressive movements such as Abstract Expressionism and Action Painting. His work was characterized by expert draughtsmanship. He is particularly remembered for the "classic modernism" of his late work, in which masses reminiscent of ancient ruins figure prominently, inspired in part by an important trip to Greece in 1970.

From 1948 until 1952, he taught at the Jepson Art Institute in Los Angeles, and the following year began his long tenure at UCLA, continuing until his retirement in 1991, when he was a beloved teacher, and mentored generations of artists, for whom he "offered a connection to European Modernism."

Brice's work is part of the permanent collections of such major museums as the Los Angeles County Museum of Art, the Los Angeles Museum of Contemporary Art, the Art Institute of Chicago and the Whitney Museum of American Art in New York City.

At age 86, he suffered injuries in a fall and never regained consciousness before dying at the UCLA Medical Center on March 3, 2008. He was survived by his wife, Shirley Bardeen, whom he had married in 1942, their son, John, and two grandsons.
