= Smile (musical) =

American musical

- Windowcard
- Music: Marvin Hamlisch
- Lyrics: Howard Ashman
- Book: Howard Ashman
- Basis: Smile by Jerry Belson
- Productions: 1986 Broadway

Smile is a musical about a fictitious beauty pageant in California, with music by Marvin Hamlisch and book and lyrics by Howard Ashman. It was originally produced on Broadway in 1986. The musical is based loosely on the 1975 comedy film of the same title, from a screenplay by Jerry Belson.

== Original film ==
The original 1975 film was directed by Michael Ritchie with a screenplay by Jerry Belson. It starred Barbara Feldon as Brenda DiCarlo, Nicholas Pryor as Andy DiCarlo (Brenda's husband in the film), Bruce Dern as Big Bob Freelander, Geoffrey Lewis as Wilson Shears, Joan Prather as Robin Gibson, Annette O'Toole as Doria Hudson, Melanie Griffith as Karen Love, and choreographer Michael Kidd as Tommy French. The movie was filmed on location in Santa Rosa, California with the pageant festivities at Veteran's Memorial Auditorium.

== Production and premiere ==
The original production opened on Broadway on November 24, 1986 at the Lunt-Fontanne Theatre and closed on January 3, 1987 after 48 performances. It was directed by Howard Ashman with musical staging by Mary Kyte. It received a Tony Award nomination for Best Book of a Musical as well as Drama Desk Award nominations for Outstanding Featured Actor in a Musical (Michael O'Gorman) and Outstanding Costume Design (William Ivey Long).

Smile is considered a "lost" musical because no official cast recording was ever made. However, there does exist a demo CD by Broadway Original cast for Samuel French Publishing, which is a primary source for groups performing the show. Because of that, demos by original cast are audible at their merchandizing site, but they have never been released publicly. Some of the songs from the show, "Disneyland," "Smile," and "In Our Hands," received their first recordings on Bruce Kimmel's Unsung Musicals album, released by Varèse Sarabande. "Disneyland" was sung by Jodi Benson, who originated it in the show. On a subsequent volume "Maria's Song" was also recorded. In November 2008, the record label PS Classics rectified this loss, releasing the album Howard Sings Ashman. The second disc is comprised completely of songs from Smile, sung by Ashman and Marvin Hamlisch, with Hamlisch at the piano. They also put a transcript of a taped conversation between Ashman, Hamlisch and Bob Fosse discussing the development of the musical on their website.

== Subsequent activity ==
After the Broadway production of Smile flopped, Ashman and Hamlisch revised the show for stock productions. Book changes include the change of Shawn's roommate from Connie-Sue to Maria, and the addition of some material for Bob. The score was further revised, gaining a completely re-structured opening number (though retaining most of the original melody and words), a new song for Brenda ("Very Best Week of Your Lives") that completely replaced the Orientation Sequence musically, a new song for Bob ("Bob's Song"), a new number for the winner of the pageant ("There Goes the Girl") and a completely new melody and lyric set for Robin's letters home and a slight decrease in the time given to them. The ending was also re-worked giving Bob a significant musical section new to the revised version.

Many of the small lyric changes to the licensed version actually originated before the Broadway production. When reading Lincoln Center's photocopy of the Broadway rehearsal script to Smile, many of the licensed lyrics are printed but scratched out and replaced with what was sung at the Lunt-Fontanne, handwritten.

An hour-long recording of the licensed version was made for Samuel French (the licensing agent) to distribute to groups interested in performing Smile. It uses many of the original Broadway cast, including Marsha Waterbury, Jodi Benson, Anne Marie Bobby, Tia Riebling and Dick Patterson. Director and author Howard Ashman played the role of Big Bob in Jeff McCarthy's absence. This recording is often referred to incorrectly as an unreleased cast recording when it is in fact a demo.

A private "industry" reading was scheduled for November 19, 2010, reflecting the revisions.

A production of Smile was presented by Awkward Stage Productions in Vancouver, British Columbia, Canada. Awkward Stage's production featured all the adult characters being played by puppets (a la "Avenue Q" style puppetry). Awkward Stage Productions' version of Smile was presented at the Firehall Arts Centre as part of the Vancouver International Fringe Festival September 8–18 2011, as well as at the Norman Rothstein Theatre in Vancouver, October 26–30, 2011.

The Smile reunion concert was presented at 54 Below, New York City, New York, on September 22, 2014. The concert featured Jodi Benson, Mana Allen, Anne Bobby, Cheryl-Ann Rossi, and other original Broadway casts.

== Summary ==
Smile chronicles the backstage troubles of the fictional 1985 California Young American Miss beauty pageant held in Santa Rosa, California. The main characters include Robin Gibson and Doria Hudson, two contestants who befriend and help each other throughout the week; Brenda DiCarlo Freelander, an ex-Young American Miss second-runner-up coordinating the pageant; and Brenda's husband Big Bob, an RV salesman trying to help her through the week.

== Story ==
Synopsis follows the plot of the revised licensed version.

=== Act 1 ===
The show opens with Dale Wilson Shears, chairman of the fictitious Young American Miss Foundation, explaining to the audience the qualities of an ideal Young American Miss. The contestants begin to enter and, throughout the course of the song, prepare for their journey to the pageant in Santa Rosa, waving goodbye as the number ends. ("Typical High School Senior"). In Santa Rosa, pageant coordinator Brenda Dicarlo Freelander and head judge Big Bob Freelander are photographed for a Jaycee newsletter. Brenda receives a letter that Wilson Shears himself will be attending the pageant. When the girls arrive, Brenda gives them an orientation presentation of what to expect during the upcoming week ("The Very Best Week of Your Lives"). The audience learns that Brenda is a former Young American Miss herself. The story then switches over to the dorms, where two sets of roommates, Maria and Shawn and Doria and Robin, are getting ready for bed. Doria, an experienced contestant, talks about her passion for pageants with Robin while the latter writes a postcard to her mother ("Dear Mom #1"). When Robin is finished, Doria relates the memory of her first pageant, a television broadcast of the Miss Anaheim pageant in Disneyland, and sings of her dream to someday go there in person ("Disneyland").

The next morning, Little Bob is caught staring at the pageant applications by his father. Oblivious to Little Bob's less-than-wholesome interest in the girls, Big Bob praises him for taking an interest in the pageant. The girls enter and begin to learn a difficult dance routine under famed choreographer Tommy French ("Shine"). During the song, several girls break away from the dance and give short speeches to Social Clubs, the local sponsors of the event. The girls exit and Brenda vows that she will stay cool under the watchful eye of Wilson Shears and the national foundation, unlike her own Young American Miss finals eighteen years ago.

Robin, who has no experience in pageants, is worn out and wants to leave ("Dear Mom #2"). Meanwhile, Shawn has become angry over the attention Mexican-American Maria is garnering from the judges and sponsors. Shawn voices her wishes to get Maria out of the competition to Valerie, another contestant. The scene shifts to Big Bob in a meeting with the other judges. He asks them to look beyond the appearance of the girls and look into their hearts, and how nobody does this. ("Bob's Song"). Late that night, Little Bob and his friend Freddy are seen sneaking around the building where the pageant will be held. Their plan, to sell nude photos of the girls to local kids, is revealed. The scene changes to the next morning, as the girls complain of various ailments brought on by the intense dance workouts, a lack of sleep, and the subpar food as Brenda passes out the day's schedule ("Nerves"). Private interviews with the judges are held. Robin, who is fatherless but refuses to play for sympathy, panics and runs out of the room when asked about her family. The girls, led by Tommy, rehearse for the upcoming Preliminary Night competition. However, the rehearsal is abruptly cut short when Tommy and Brenda argue over a large ramp extending into the audience. Although featured in Tommy's plans, the ramp made unusable many seats that had already been sold. Brenda offers to deduct the cost of the seats from Tommy's check, which prompts him to strike the ramp. When the girls try to rehearse without it, one of the contestants falls. Seeing Brenda's lack of sympathy, Tommy tells her to deduct the money and proceed with the ramp. Preliminary night begins and the girls compete in three categories: Vim and Vigor, Scholastic Achievement, and Creative Talent. ("Young and American"). Sandra-Kay Macaffee, Robin Gibson, and Maria Gonzales win respectively in each category.

The girls return to the dorms and Doria, who believes she has no chance of winning the competition now, begins to pass on her knowledge of pageantry. The girls begin to sing of their anxiety for the pageant the next night, later joined by Brenda and Big Bob ("Until Tomorrow Night"). Shawn catches Little Bob and Freddy taking pictures of her in the shower and, though initially angry, strikes up a deal with them. The song ends in state of high anticipation.

=== Act 2 ===
In the dressing room just before the pageant Robin writes a third letter to her mother ("Dear Mom #3"). The girls anxiously sing of the pageant as they make their final preparations and are introduced to the event's MC, radio and television personality Ted Farley ("Opening Act 2"). The girls, preparations complete, exit. The "pageant" opens with Ted Farley greeting the audience and introducing the previous year's winner, Joanne Marshall. The two dance briefly and the girls enter, carrying parasols ("Smile"). As they sing, each girl gets a chance to open her parasol and perform a brief quip. When Robin's turn comes, her parasol breaks and she runs offstage. Encouraged by Tommy French, she runs on and ad-libs a quip before the dance moves on. The girls continue their dance as a slideshow of their photographs appear on a large screen. Each girl has a chance to pose in front of her photograph, concluding with Maria. However, to Maria's shock and horror, the photo she sees is not a posed glamour shot, but a nude photo taken in the shower. Maria runs off and the action switches backstage. As Ted continues the show, Brenda attempts to persuade Maria to go back on stage and perform. Maria refuses and leaves.

Dale Wilson-Shears confronts Brenda about the catastrophe on stage as the girls perform an (off-stage) number ("Get The Girls"). After realizing that Maria was a finalist in the competition, she crosses her name off of the list and marches onto the pageant stage. After she gives an impassioned defense of the pageant and its honor, Ted announces the four finalists: Shawn, Sandra-Kay, Robin, and Doria. The girls sing as Ted introduces the finalists ("We Wish We Were You"). Backstage, Bob informs Brenda that the judges do not want to pick a winner in light of what happened. He and Brenda fight and Brenda fires Bob. The four finalists then give their final remarks before the winner is announced. ("In Our Hands"). Robin finally reveals to the judges that she is fatherless, and Big Bob finds out that his son is the one who took that picture. Ted and Joanne announce the first runner-up of the pageant, Doria Hudson. After a brief moment, the winner is announced as Sandra-Kay, Bakerfield's Young American Miss. Ted sings as Sandra-Kay walks the runway ("There Goes The Girl")

Wilson Shears congratulates Brenda on saving the pageant and offers her a spot on the National Committee. Brenda tries to reconcile with Bob, but to no avail. Bob, alone on stage, wonders how he can reconcile with his family. In their dorm room, Doria tries to convince Robin to join her in the Miss Sunbelt Pageant. Robin ultimately decides to go home to find her own destiny. When she sees that Robin has left without her, Doria takes a winner's stance in her runner-up tiara and roses, once again singing of Disneyland, the only place she can feel loved and accepted ("Finale")

== Musical numbers ==
Broadway Production

Act I

- "Overture" – Orchestra
- "Prologue/Typical High School Senior" – Contestants
- "Orientation/Postcard #1" – Brenda, Robin and Contestants
- "Disneyland" – Doria
- "Shine" – Contestants, Tommy and Brenda
- "Postcard #2" – Robin
- "Nerves" – Contestants
- "Young and American (Preliminary Night)" – Contestants
- "Until Tomorrow Night" – Doria, Contestants, Brenda and Big Bob

Act II

- "Postcard #3/Dressing Room Scene" – Robin, Doria, Ted and Contestants
- "Smile" – Ted and Contestants
- "We Wish We Were You" — Contestants
- "In Our Hands" – Contestants
- "Pretty as a Picture" – Ted, Big Bob, Robin and Contestants
- "Disneyland (Reprise)" – Doria

== Original Broadway characters and cast ==
The original Broadway cast included 16 contestants, a number of incidental roles, and the principal roles listed below.

Performer	Character	Description
Marsha Waterbury	Brenda DiCarlo Freelander	Pageant organizer
Jeff McCarthy	Big Bob Freelander	Brenda's husband
Jodi Benson	Doria Hudson	Contestant/Yuba City
Veanne Cox	Sandra-Kay Macaffee	Contestant/Bakersfield
Anne Marie Bobby	Robin Gibson	Contestant/Antelope Valley
Tia Riebling	Shawn Christianson	Contestant/La Jolla
Cheryl-Ann Rossi	Maria Gonzales	Contestant/Salinas
Michael O'Gorman	Tommy French	The pageant choreographer
Andrew Cassese	Freddy	Little Bob's friend
Tommy Daggett	Little Bob Freelander	Brenda and Big Bob's son
Dick Patterson	Ted Farley	The emcee

== Accolades ==
- Tony Award for Best Book of a Musical - nominated
- Drama Desk Award for Outstanding Featured Actor in a Musical (O'Gorman) and Drama Desk Award for Outstanding Costume Design (William Ivey Long) - nominated
