= Kurt Vonnegut's God Bless You, Mr. Rosewater =

- Promo art for the 2016 Encores! production
- Music: Alan Menken
- Lyrics: Howard Ashman; Dennis Green
- Book: Howard Ashman
- Basis: God Bless You, Mr. Rosewater by Kurt Vonnegut
- Productions: 1979 Off-Broadway; 1981 Arena Stage; 2016 Encores! Off-Center

Kurt Vonnegut's God Bless You, Mr. Rosewater is a 1979 musical that marked the first collaboration of composer Alan Menken and writer Howard Ashman. Based on Kurt Vonnegut's 1965 novel of the same name, the musical tells the story of Eliot Rosewater, a millionaire who develops a social conscience and creates a foundation to improve the lives of the citizens of an impoverished Indiana town.

== Productions ==
The musical had a showcase in May 1979 at the WPA Theater in New York City. Directed by Ashman, Frederick Coffin played Eliot Rosewater and Jonathan Hadary played Mushari. Menken played the keyboards.

The musical transferred to the Entermedia Theatre Off-Broadway, where it opened on October 14, 1979 and closed on November 24, after 49 performances. Directed by Ashman, the production featured Frederick Coffin (Eliot Rosewater), Janie Sell (Sylvia Rosewater), and Jonathan Hadary (Norman Mushari).

The musical was produced at the Arena Stage in Washington, D.C. in May to June 1981, again directed by Ashman and starring Coffin. The cast also featured Robert Westenberg, Steve Liebman, Theresa Rabov, and Leslie Cass.

In March 2003, Rosewater was performed in concert as part of the CooperArts series at the Cooper Union; the concert featured Jim Walton (Eliot Rosewater), Carolee Carmello (Sylvia Rosewater), and David Pittu (Norman Mushari).

The New England premiere of the show was performed from April 14–24, 2016 by Cape Cod Community College, in West Barnstable, Massachusetts. The cast was made up of primarily students and most had heard of the book (Kurt Vonnegut was a resident of the area), however, not many knew that it had been made into a musical.

An Encores! Off-Center staged concert ran at New York City Center from July 27–30, 2016. The production starred Skylar Astin (Norman Mushari), Santino Fontana (Eliot Rosewater), Brynn O'Malley (Sylvia), and James Earl Jones (Kilgore Trout). The production also featured Rebecca Naomi Jones and was directed by Michael Mayer. This cast recorded the first studio recording of this musical in 2017.

== Cast and characters ==
Characters	WPA Theater (1979)	Off-Broadway (1979)	Arena Stage (1981)	Cooper Union (2003)	Encores! (2016)
Eliot Rosewater	Frederick Coffin	Frederick Coffin	Frederick Coffin	Jim Walton	Santino Fontana
Sylvia Rosewater	Mimi Turque	Janie Sell	Barbara Andres	Carolee Carmello	Brynn O'Malley
Norman Mushari	Jonathan Hadary	Jonathan Hadary	Robert Westenberg	David Pittu	Skylar Astin

== Musical numbers ==
Source: CurtainUp

Act I

- Overture — Orchestra
- The Rosewater Foundation — Rosewater Foundation Office Workers, Eliot, Company
- The Rosewater Foundation (Reprise) — Eliot
- Dear Ophelia — Eliot
- Thank God for the Volunteer Fire Brigade — Firefighters, Eliot, Company
- Mushari's Waltz (Magical Moment) — Mushari
- Thirty Miles From the Banks of the Ohio/Look Who's Here — Eliot, Rosewater Township Citizens
- Cheese Nips — Sylvia, Company
- The Rosewater Foundation (Reprise II) — Eliot, Township Citizens
- Since You Came to This Town — Rosewater Township Citizens, Company

Act II

- A Poem by William Blake — A Voice Not Unlike God's, Company
- The Rhode Island Tango — Fred, Caroline, Mushari
- Eliot/Sylvia — Eliot, Sylvia
- Plain Clean Average Americans — Mushari, Eliot, Caroline, Fred, Company
- A Firestorm Consuming Indianapolis — Eliot
- Dear Ophelia (Reprise) — Sylvia
- I, Eliot Rosewater — Eliot, Company
