= 1992 Academy Awards =

1992 Academy Awards may refer to:

- 64th Academy Awards, the Academy Awards ceremony that took place in 1992
- 65th Academy Awards, the 1993 ceremony honoring the best in film of 1992
