= 1993 Academy Awards =

1993 Academy Awards may refer to:

- 65th Academy Awards, the Academy Awards ceremony that took place in 1993
- 66th Academy Awards, the 1994 ceremony honoring the best in film for 1993
