= Nicky Arnstein =

American professional gambler and con artist

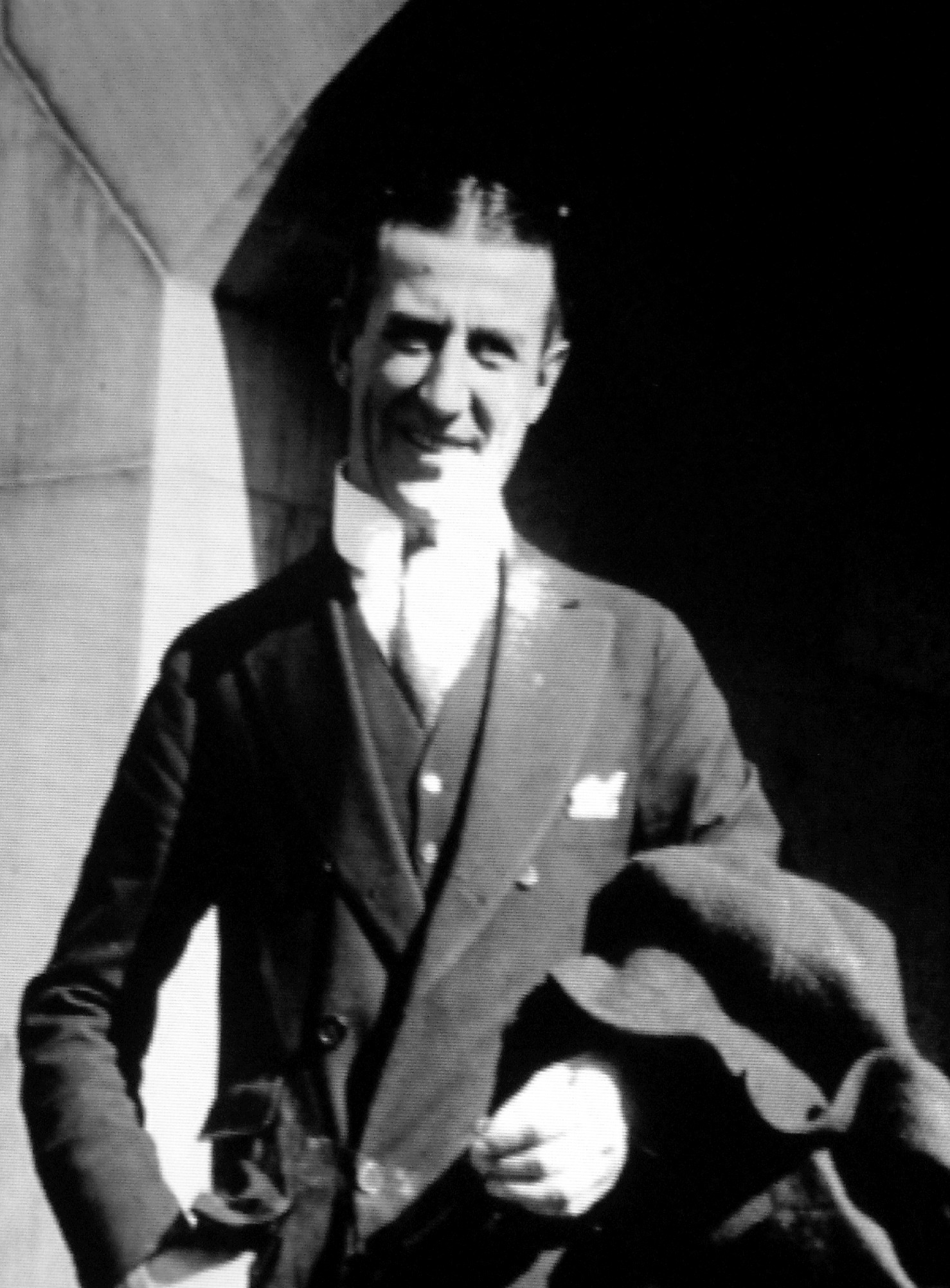
- Born: Julius Wilford Arndstein; July 1, 1879; Berlin, German Empire
- Died: October 2, 1965 (aged 86); Los Angeles, California, U.S.
- Other names: Julius Arnold, Jules Arndtsteyn, Nick Arnold, Nicholas Arnold, Wallace Ames, John Adams, J. Willard Adair
- Occupations: Professional gambler, confidence trickster
- Spouses: Carrie Greenthal (m. 1906–1918) Fanny Brice (m. 1918–1927) Isabelle McCullough (m. 1929)
- Children: Frances (1919–1992); William (1921–2008)

Julius Wilford "Nicky" Arnstein (born Arndstein; July 1, 1879 – October 2, 1965) was an American professional gambler and con artist. He was known primarily as Julius Arnold, but among his aliases were "Jules Arndtsteyn", "Nick Arnold," "Nicholas Arnold", "Wallace Ames", "John Adams", and "J. Willard Adair". He was best known as the second husband of entertainer Fanny Brice.

== Early life ==
Arnstein was born Julius Arndstein in Berlin, German Empire. His father, Moses Arndstein, was a German Jew from Berlin who fought in the Franco-Prussian War. His mother, born Thekla van Shaw, was Dutch. The couple raised their children in the Episcopal Church. First settling in New Jersey, the couple had two other children besides middle-child Nicky – son Louis (born 1877) and daughter Gesina (born 1883). Nicky was short for "nickel plate", a nickname he received in the 1890s when, as a teenager, Arnstein rode a bicycle with nickel-plated spokes in professional bike races. The bike races drew Arnstein into the company of gamblers and he enjoyed throwing races more than winning them.

== Adult life and marriages ==
On May 5, 1906, Arnstein married Carrie Greenthal of New Jersey and abandoned her after three years. He gambled cards on transatlantic liners and in European casinos, and eventually fell in with Arnold Rothstein, a loan shark, bookmaker, fence, Wall Street swindler, real estate speculator, and labor racketeer, who was best known for fixing the 1919 World Series. Arnstein was arrested multiple times between 1909 and 1912 for various cons in London, Paris and Monte Carlo, but wasn't convicted.

=== Fanny Brice ===
Arnstein met Fanny Brice in Philadelphia in 1912 where she was performing in The Whirl of Society. Brice fell in love with Arnstein even though she knew his background, and he soon moved in with Brice and her mother in New York City.

In 1915, Arnstein was convicted of a wiretapping swindle as a member of the Gondorff gang. He entered Sing Sing and served two years of a three year sentence before Brice got him pardoned. Brice visited him every week while he was there.

In 1918, Arnstein's wife Carrie sued Brice for alienation of his affection. She subsequently divorced him, leaving him free to marry Brice in October of that year. Arnstein and Brice had two children, daughter Frances Arnstein Stark (1919–1992) and son William Arnstein (1921–2008), a graphic artist later known professionally as William Brice.

On May 16, 1924, having been convicted of conspiracy to sell $5 million of stolen securities, Arnstein entered Leavenworth prison, where he remained for almost two years. Brice divorced him on September 17, 1927 on grounds of infidelity.

=== Third marriage ===
On October 18, 1929, Arnstein married Isabelle McCullough whom he met in 1927 through her husband, Chicago promoter Charles McCullough. She had a fortune of $2 million and the couple lived at Sutton Place in New York City. Arnstein, using the alias Jules Arnold, was briefly arrested in New York City on April 5, 1929 for allegedly swindling $32,000 from a Massachusetts man, but was released two days later when it was shown he only resembled the actual culprit.

According to Arnstein, he "tried industriously" to find legitimate work during the 1930s. He said he tried advertising in Manhattan but failed, then moved to Los Angeles and tried an air conditioning business that struggled during the depression. Following the release of the 1939 film musical Rose of Washington Square which depicted the lives of Fanny Brice and Arnstein, Arnstein sued 20th Century Fox for $400,000 for defamation of character. Arnstein said his character as portrayed by Tyrone Power depicted him as "a coward, weakling, confidence man, swindler to say nothing of a faithless deceitful husband." Although he lived in a mansion in Pasadena, Arnstein said he and his wife lived a quiet life, but the continual linking of his name to swindling was "unfair.". The lawsuit was settled out of court for a reported cash payment of $20–25,000.

The stage musical Funny Girl opened on Broadway in 1964, in which Arnstein was portrayed by Sydney Chaplin. In the musical, Arnstein is found guilty of embezzlement, has never been married to anyone but Fanny, and serves only one prison sentence – after being married for several years. Three years later, Omar Sharif assumed the role in the 1968 Barbra Streisand film and its 1975 sequel Funny Lady.

== Death ==
Arnstein died October 2, 1965 in Los Angeles, California. His death notice and burial at Mount Olive Memorial Park were listed under the name of Jules Arnold.
