= Landers Theatre =

- U.S. National Register of Historic Places
- U.S. Historic district – Contributing property
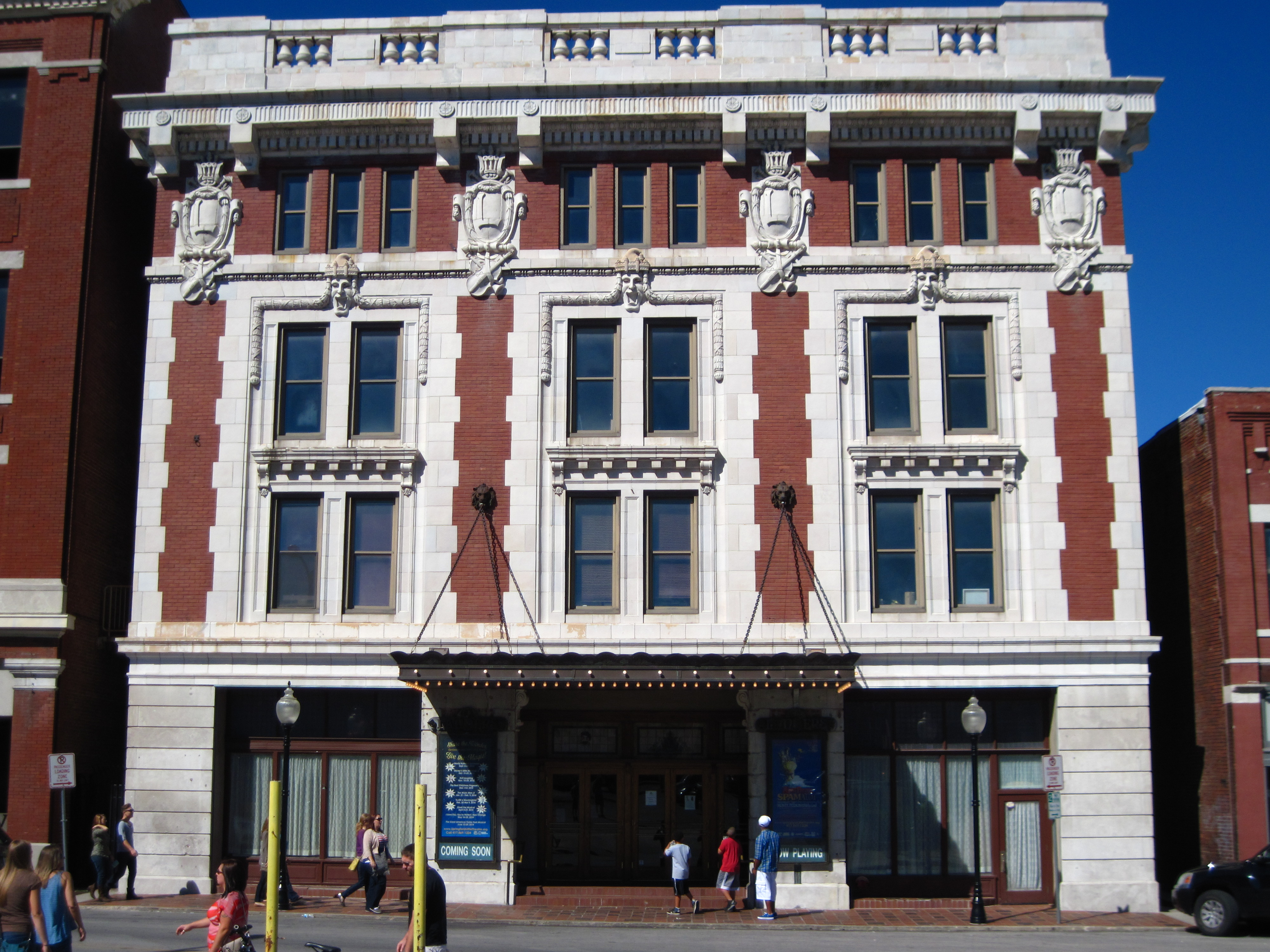

- Location within Missouri
- Location: Springfield, Missouri
- Coordinates: 37°12′26.44″N 93°17′26.7″W
- Built: 1909
- Architect: Carl Boller
- Architectural style: neoclassical
- NRHP reference No.: 77000806
- Added to NRHP: August 12, 1977

The Landers Theatre in Springfield, Missouri, built in 1909, is the second oldest and largest civic theater operation in Missouri. It has been in continuous use either as a legitimate theatre or a movie theater since it opened. In 1928, the theater became the 35th facility in the world to acquire sound film. It was designed by architects Carl Boller and Brother in association with Hickenlively and Mark of Springfield in a French-influenced neoclassical style. It is located in the Walnut Street Commercial Historic District.

The theater is unusual in its use of wood for nearly all structural framing, in contrast with the steel and cast iron more usually employed in its time. D.J. Landers, the original owner, was in the lumber business, providing a possible explanation. Where steel is employed, it uses unusual bonded steel and masonry assemblies. The theater was designed for live performance, with a large stage and supporting spaces.

The theater's street facade employs Missouri limestone piers with terra cotta cornices, cartouches, quoins and parapets. Infill between these decorative elements is brick.

A fire in 1920 completely gutted the stage area, but the remainder was saved by the fireproof asbestos curtain. Subsequent renovations moved the orchestra pit behind the curtain and raised the boxes. Heavy clear-span beams replaced columns supporting the balconies, and the Jim Crow-era ticket booth for "coloreds" and its separate entrance were removed.

From March 17–September 22, 1961, NBC-TV carried a live country music variety program from the theater, Five Star Jubilee, on Friday nights; the first network color television series to originate outside of New York City or Hollywood. First-run films continued to be shown on the other six nights of the week.

Landers was placed on the National Register of Historic Places in 1977, significant for the preserved Baroque Renaissance, Napoleon architectural style. A number of major restoration projects have been undertaken, and the most recent restorations have been cited with awards from the American Institute of Architects.

It is currently the home of the Springfield Little Theatre.
