= Dan Kuenster =

American character animator and director (born 1955)

Dan Kuenster (born December 29, 1955, in Chicago, Illinois) is an American character animator and director, who worked for Walt Disney Animation Studios, BrainPower Studio and Sullivan Bluth Studios, before pursuing educational multimedia projects. He is also formerly Executive Vice President of Design and Animation at Istation in Dallas, Texas.

== Career ==
While working on The Fox and the Hound, Kuenster met animator Don Bluth, and later left Disney for Bluth's newly formed independent studio. He continued to work through the growth of Sullivan Bluth studios, and when production facilities moved to Dublin, Ireland, he relocated to co-direct two of its most ambitious films, All Dogs Go to Heaven and Rock-a-Doodle. He returned to Los Angeles in the mid-1990s, to focus on the budding interactive and multimedia industry, where he designed games and animated for software developer 7th Level. Kuenster has also worked on many live action projects as a director, screenwriter, and storyboard artist, and he has voice acted in many of his films.

The Emmy Award for Outstanding Individual Achievement in Animation was presented to him in 2004, for storyboarding the PBS show Jakers! The Adventures of Piggley Winks.

He retired in October 2024 from his role as Executive Vice President of Design and Animation at Istation (Imagination Station), a software developer and publisher of integrated reading and math intervention programs.”

In 2017, Kuenster was a 2D animator and storyboard artist for the HBO Show, A Little Curious for "The Mop Mambo", "Terrible Terrible", "Sweet Soda" and "Hot or Cold".

== Selected filmography ==
- The Small One (assistant animator: The Donkey, Boy's Father, Auctioneer) (uncredited)
- Banjo the Woodpile Cat (special thanks)
- Xanadu (assistant animator: animated sequence)
- The Fox and the Hound (assistant animator: Big Mama, Vixey, Widow Tweed) (uncredited)
- The Secret of NIMH (animator)
- Dragon's Lair (animator)
- An American Tail (directing animator, uncredited voice of Jake)
- The Land Before Time (directing animator: Littlefoot's mother)
- All Dogs Go To Heaven (co-director, voice of Doberman Bookie)
- Dragon's Lair II: Time Warp (animation staff)
- Rock-A-Doodle (co-director, uncredited voice of Rhino Waiter)
- FernGully: The Last Rainforest (character animation lead: Batty Koda)
- Tom and Jerry: The Movie (animator: Creative Capers Cartoons)
- Once Upon A Forest (animator: The Hollywood Cartoon Company) (uncredited)
- A Troll in Central Park (storyboard artist)
- Felidae (director and producer: Kuenster Bros. Animation) (uncredited)
- The Pagemaster (additional animator) (uncredited)
- Timon & Pumbaa's Jungle Games (game designer, animation director: 7th Level)
- The Pebble and the Penguin (additional character animator)
- The Secret of NIMH 2: Timmy to the Rescue (storyboard artist)
- Jakers! The Adventures of Piggley Winks (storyboard artist)
- Tamagotchi Video Adventures (actor, animator)
- Tamagotchi CD-ROM (animator, writer)
