= Morris Sullivan =

American film producer

- Born: December 8, 1916; Seattle, Washington
- Died: August 24, 2008 (aged 91); Toluca Lake, California
- Other names: Morris F. Sullivan
- Occupations: Studio executive/Film producer and businessman
- Years active: 1982–1995
- Known for: Sullivan Bluth Studios
- Spouse: Rose Sullivan

Morris Francis Sullivan (December 8, 1916 – August 24, 2008) was an American businessman who co-founded the Sullivan Bluth Studios with three former Disney animators. Sullivan Bluth Studios employed approximately 400 people at the peak of its success. Under Sullivan's direction, the former animation studio created such films as The Land Before Time and An American Tail.

== Biography ==
=== Early life ===
Morris F. Sullivan was born in Seattle, Washington, on December 8, 1916, to parents Frank and Pauline Sullivan. His father, Frank, owned a local lumber company in the Pacific Northwest.

Sullivan received his bachelor's degree in business finance from Seattle College. Sullivan married his wife, Rose, in 1941. The family relocated to La Crescenta, California, in 1948. The family relocated to a large home in La Cañada Flintridge, California, after the ninth of Sullivan's ten children were born in 1954.

=== Career ===
Sullivan founded his own financial consulting company, M.F. Sullivan and Co., a corporate mergers and acquisitions firm, in 1960. The company was based in downtown Los Angeles.

=== Sullivan Bluth Studios ===
Three of Walt Disney Productions' highest ranking animators — Don Bluth, Gary Goldman and John Pomeroy — left Walt Disney Productions in 1979, along with a group of artists and animators. The animators and artists, led by Bluth, felt that the company had turned against its traditional production values in favor of pursuing a profitable bottom line. Bluth, Pomerory and Goldman set up a new animation studio based in Van Nuys, California. The new company was struggling financially and looking for a source of financing. According to the Los Angeles Times, Morris Sullivan, who was semi-retired in the early 1980s, was persuaded to join the new company and provide financing by a golf partner.

Bluth and the other animators screened their 1982 animated film, The Secret of NIMH, to persuade Sullivan to join the company. At the end of The Secret of NIMH screening an impressed Sullivan told Bluth and the other animators that, "I'm your guardian angel. I'm going to make this work for you." In a 1989 interview with the Los Angeles Times, Don Bluth said of Morris' early involvement with the company that, "He came along at a time when we were desperate, and he saved us."

Sullivan, who provided financing to the company, which eventually became known as Sullivan Bluth Studios, became its owner-president. During the production of the 1986 film, An American Tail, Sullivan began orchestrating a plan to move the majority of the studio's operations to Dublin, Ireland. Sullivan had discovered that animated feature films could be made for much less in Ireland due to grants and Tax Incentives. According to Sullivan's daughter, Terry Sullivan Maphis, "He orchestrated the move to Dublin . . . to capitalize on the Irish government's special tax subsidies to filmmakers." By moving to Ireland, Bluth Sullivan Studios had a major impact in the emergence of an Irish animation industry, including the National College of Art and Design.

Sullivan Bluth Studios had approximately 400 employees at the peak of its success and produced landmark animated films including The Land Before Time in 1988 and All Dogs Go to Heaven in 1989. However, the Studio struggled after another major investor withdrew financial support, partially due to a string of films which were unsuccessful at the box office. Don Bluth and Gary Goldman, two of the co-founders of the company, left Sullivan Bluth Studios in 1994 to set up the now defunct Fox Animation Studios. With a string of unsuccessful films and the departure of two of its founders, Sullivan Bluth Studios closed in 1995.

=== Death ===
Morris Sullivan died on August 24, 2008, at his home in Toluca Lake, California, of complications from old age. He was 91 years old. Morris was survived by nine of his ten children — David, Kathleen, Patrick, Michael, Kelly, Mary, Tim, Terry and Dan; as well as nine grandchildren; and four great-grandchildren. His wife, Rose, died in 1971, while his daughter, Maureen, died in 1998.

Sullivan's memorial service was held at St. Charles Borromeo Catholic Church in North Hollywood.
