= Fox Animation Studios =

American animation studio founded by Don Bluth (1994–2000)

- Type: Subsidiary
- Industry: 2D hand-drawn/CGI animation
- Predecessor: Don Bluth Entertainment
- Founded: August 8, 1994; 32 years ago
- Founders: Don Bluth; Gary Goldman; Bill Mechanic
- Defunct: June 26, 2000; 26 years ago
- Fate: Folded into 20th Century Fox Animation
- Successors: 20th Century Fox Animation; Blue Sky Studios
- Headquarters: 2747 E. Camelback Road, Phoenix, Arizona
- Key people: Don Bluth (president); Gary Goldman (Senior VIP President); Anne Noakes (CEO)
- Products: Animated features
- Number of employees: 80 (2000)
- Parent: 20th Century Fox Animation

Fox Animation Studios was an American animation studio owned by 20th Century Fox and located in Phoenix, Arizona. It was a subsidiary of 20th Century Fox Animation and was established by animators Don Bluth and Gary Goldman on August 8, 1994. It operated for six years, until the studio was shut down on June 26, 2000, ten days after the release of its final film, Titan A.E.. Most of the Fox Animation Studios library was later acquired by Disney (via 20th Century Studios) on March 20, 2019. Anastasia (1997) is the studio's most critically praised and commercially successful film, as well as the most commercially successful film by Bluth.

== History ==
=== Founding ===
After the financially unsuccessful release of the Don Bluth Entertainment-produced film Thumbelina on March 30, 1994, animators Don Bluth and Gary Goldman were hired by Bill Mechanic, then-chairman of 20th Century Fox, to create a brand new Fox animation studio. Mechanic and John Matoian, president of Fox Family Films, also brought in Stephen Brain (Executive VP at Silver Pictures) as Senior VP/General Manager to oversee the startup of the studio and run day-to-day operations of the division.

The company was designed to compete with Walt Disney Feature Animation (owned by The Walt Disney Company – which would later acquire certain Fox assets in March 2019, including the rights to Fox Animation Studios' film library), which had phenomenal success during the late 1980s and early 1990s with the releases of films such as The Little Mermaid (1989), Beauty and the Beast (1991), Aladdin (1992) and The Lion King (1994). Disney veterans Bluth and Goldman came in 1994 to Fox from Sullivan Bluth Studios, which had produced The Secret of NIMH (1982), An American Tail (1986), The Land Before Time (1988), and All Dogs Go to Heaven (1989), among other films.

Before Bluth came to Fox, the studio distributed three animated features during the 1990s which were produced by outside studios – FernGully: The Last Rainforest (1992), Once Upon a Forest (1993) and The Pagemaster (1994), the last two of which were both commercial and critical failures. Even before, Fox distributed Hugo the Hippo (1975) by William Feigenbaum and József Gémes, two Ralph Bakshi features, Wizards (1977) and Fire and Ice (1983), as well as Raggedy Ann & Andy: A Musical Adventure (1977) by Richard Williams. Also, Fox distributed Asterix Conquers America (1994) in France and the United Kingdom.

=== Productions ===
Fox Animation Studios did not achieve the same level of success as Disney's animated crop, due to increasingly stiff competition from Pixar and DreamWorks Animation with their computer-generated animated films and the declining revenues of the Disney Renaissance. The films used digital ink and paint similar to Disney's CAPS software, more specifically the Toonz software program. The studio's first theatrical release Anastasia (1997) was a critical and box-office success (and was and still remains the most successful film by its director Don Bluth), but their second and final theatrical release Titan A.E. (2000) got mixed reviews and was a costly flop, losing $100 million for 20th Century Fox. Nearly a year before its closure, 20th Century Fox laid off 300 of the nearly 380 people who worked at the Phoenix studio in order to "make films more efficiently".

=== Shutdown and legacy ===
On June 26, 2000, the studio was shut down after 6 years of operation as a result of the box office failure of Titan A.E.. The film was set to be made would have been an adaptation of Wayne Barlowe's illustrated novel Barlowe's Inferno, and was set to be done entirely with computer animation, which would have made it 20th Century Fox's first fully computer animated film, predating Ice Age, which was released in 2002. Another film they would have made was The Little Beauty King, an adult animated film directed by Steve Oedekerk, which would have been a satire of the films from the Disney Renaissance. It would predate DreamWorks' Shrek, which was released in 2001.

Fox Animation Studios' only other productions were the PBS television series Adventures from the Book of Virtues (1996–2000) and the direct-to-video spin-off to Anastasia, Bartok the Magnificent (1999), along with sub-contract work for DreamWorks Animation's The Prince of Egypt (1998). Out of all the television shows, sequels and spin-offs based on Don Bluth properties, Bartok was the only one to actually have Bluth and Goldman as directors. Anastasia would later be adapted into a stage musical that premiered in 2016 in Hartford, Connecticut. The former headquarters for the studio sat unused and abandoned until it was torn down in 2017. An apartment complex was built on the site in 2019. As of March 20, 2019, most of the studio's library is now currently owned by The Walt Disney Company due to its finished acquisition of 21st Century Fox, with the exception of The Prince of Egypt, which is currently owned by Universal Pictures via DreamWorks Animation, and Adventures from the Book of Virtues, which is owned by PBS.

== Filmography ==
Title	Release date	Directed by	Story by	Screenplay by	Produced by	Budget	Gross	Rotten Tomatoes	Metacritic	Notes
Anastasia	November 21, 1997	Don Bluth and Gary Goldman	Eric Tuchman	Susan Gauthier, Bruce Graham, Bob Tzudiker, and Noni White	Don Bluth and Gary Goldman	$53 million	$140 million	83% (58 reviews)	61	co-production with Fox Family Films
Bartok the Magnificent	November 16, 1999	Don Bluth and Gary Goldman	Jay Lacopo		Don Bluth and Gary Goldman	$24.8 million	—N/a	—N/a (3 reviews)	—N/a	Direct-to-video release, co-production with 20th Century Fox Animation
Titan A.E.	June 16, 2000	Don Bluth and Gary Goldman	Hans Bauer and Randall McCormick	Ben Edlund, John August, and Joss Whedon	Don Bluth, Gary Goldman, and David Kirschner	$75–85 million	$36.8 million	50% (103 reviews)	48	co-production with 20th Century Fox Animation and David Kirschner Productions

=== Animation service ===
Title	Release date	Studio(s)	Notes
Adventures from the Book of Virtues	1996–2000	KCET Los Angeles; PorchLight Entertainment	TV series; aired on PBS
The Prince of Egypt	1998	DreamWorks Pictures; DreamWorks Animation	additional final line animation

=== Cancelled projects ===
Title	Notes
Betty of the Jungle	In 1995, animator Bill Kopp (creator of Fox Kids' Eek! The Cat) pitched an idea for an original adult animated film called Betty of the Jungle, in which he describes it as a sexy George of the Jungle about jungle warrior woman Betty (set to be voiced by Loni Anderson) and her gun-carrying poodle (set to be voiced by Bruce Willis) who battle evil to protect their jungle village. However, after an animation test and conceptual artwork, Fox Animation declined to approve the project.
Dracula	At one time, Fox Animation had planned to produce an adult animated musical adaptation of Dracula, described as a Disney style Rocky Horror Picture Show.
Barlowe's Inferno	A computer-animated film based on Wayne Barlowe's novel of the same name. Was to be Fox Animation Studios' next film after Titan A.E. and would have been 20th Century Fox's first fully computer-animated film, before Ice Age.
Rhapsody	Fox Animation had intended to produce an animated film based on the first installment of the Rhapsody trilogy by Elizabeth Haydon. The story was to tell of a human girl named Rhapsody going on an epic quest with the warrior Achmed and a Firbolg named Grunthor.
The Little Beauty King	An adult animated film directed by Steve Oedekerk, which would have been a satire of the films from the Disney Renaissance. It would predate Shrek.
Over the Hedge	Based on the comic of the same name by Michael Fry and T. Lewis. Later picked up by DreamWorks Animation.
Africa	An adult animated epic film set in Africa. Animator Will Makra posted concept art of the film later on.
Fathom	In June 2000, the reports circulated that Fox was adapting the comic book series Fathom.
Ice Age	Fox Animation Studios was originally working on a traditionally animated action-oriented comedy-drama film set in the Ice age. Around the same time, Blue Sky Studios, a small visual effects studio in White Plains, New York, was bought out by Fox and reshaped into a full-fledged CG animation film studio. In light of this, Fox Animation head Chris Meledandri and executive producer Steve Bannerman approached Forte with the proposition of developing the film as a computer-animated film, which Forte realized was "basically a no-brainer", according to her.

== See also ==
- Don Bluth Entertainment
- 20th Century Animation
- Blue Sky Studios
- 20th Television Animation
- Walt Disney Animation Studios
- Pixar
- Disneytoon Studios
- List of 20th Century Studios theatrical animated feature films
