= Michael Nunes (actor) =

American actor

Michael John Nunes (born August 7, 1986, in Seattle) is an American actor who played Howie in Full House, Timmy in Parker Lewis Can't Lose, Li'l Bee in Thumbelina (1994) and Beany in The Pebble and the Penguin (1995), before Don Bluth and Gary Goldman went to 20th Century Fox to direct the film Anastasia (1997).

== Filmography ==
Year	Title	Role	Notes	Ref
1994	Thumbelina	Li'l Bee	Voice	
1995	The Pebble and the Penguin	Beany	Voice, (final film role)	
