= The Pebble and the Penguin =

- Theatrical release poster
- Directed by: Don Bluth (uncredited); Gary Goldman (uncredited)
- Screenplay by: Rachel Koretsky; Steven Whitestone
- Produced by: Russell Boland; Don Bluth (uncredited); Gary Goldman (uncredited); John Pomeroy (uncredited)
- Starring: Martin Short; James Belushi; Tim Curry; Annie Golden
- Narrated by: Shani Wallis
- Edited by: Fiona Trayler; Aran O'Reilly
- Music by: Mark Watters (score); Barry Manilow (songs); Bruce Sussman (songs)
- Production company: Don Bluth Ireland Limited
- Distributed by: MGM/UA Distribution Co. (United States and Canada); Warner Bros. (International)
- Release date: April 12, 1995 (United States)
- Running time: 74 minutes
- Countries: United States; Ireland
- Language: English
- Budget: $28 million
- Box office: $3.9 million

The Pebble and the Penguin is a 1995 independent animated musical romance comedy-adventure film directed by Don Bluth and Gary Goldman. The film stars the voices of Martin Short, Jim Belushi, Tim Curry, and Annie Golden. Based on the true life mating rituals of the Adélie penguins in Antarctica, the film focuses on a timid, stuttering penguin named Hubie who tries to impress a beautiful penguin named Marina by giving her a pebble that fell from the sky and keep her from the clutches of an evil penguin named Drake who wants Marina for himself, causing Hubie to team up with a cantankerous yet good-hearted rockhopper penguin named Rocko.

Towards the end of production, Metro-Goldwyn-Mayer Pictures significantly changed the film, resulting in Bluth and Goldman leaving the film and asking to have their names taken off of it. The two would later start working at Fox Animation Studios.

The film was released in the United States on April 12, 1995, by MGM/UA Distribution Co. in the United States and Canada and by Warner Bros. in other territories, was panned by critics and became a box office failure, grossing $3.9 million against a $28 million budget. It is the final film to be produced by Don Bluth Ireland Limited before the studio went bankrupt and ceased operations.

== Plot ==
In Antarctica, the Adélie penguins practice a tradition in which during the mating season, the male birds gather on the beaches to find a pebble to use in a mating ritual, and during the night of the full moon mating ceremony, the males propose to the female they love by presenting their pebble to them, and if they accept it, they become a married couple. Hubie, a shy and good-hearted male penguin, loves Marina, the most beautiful penguin in the rookery who also seems to like him, but his evil archrival Drake, a muscular penguin who is said to always get his way, similarly covets Marina's affection. One night, Hubie and Marina discuss their feelings for each other, but Hubie is unable to secure a suitable pebble to propose to Marina with. He wishes on a star to make his dream come true, and he receives a beautiful emerald cube from the sky.

The next morning, Hubie ecstatically rushes to find Marina, but is intercepted by Drake, who demands the emerald. Hubie refuses and Drake throws him into the water. Hubie narrowly escapes from a leopard seal and climbs onto a piece of an iceberg, where he is swept away from Antarctica.

Three days later, Hubie is picked up by humans and brought aboard a ship en route to a zoo, and he meets a gruff and feisty Northern rockhopper penguin named Rocko. Through the emerald, Hubie sees Drake attempting to press Marina into his hand in mating by threatening her with expulsion from the rookery if she refuses. Hubie escapes the ship with Rocko and they lay low on a beach. Rocko reluctantly tells Hubie about his desire to fly and live in a tropical climate. Hubie convinces Rocko to join him in his journey back to Antarctica by concocting an imaginary flying penguin named Waldo. Rocko soon discovers Hubie's deception, but recognizes Hubie's will to return to Marina and remains at his side. The pair's friendship is further fortified following an escape from a leopard seal. They are later attacked by a pod of killer whales. During the altercation, Hubie's pebble is lost and Rocko goes missing, leaving Hubie to believe he has been killed.

Hubie manages to locate Drake and confronts him in a fight before defeating him. As Hubie and Marina reunite, Rocko, who survived the killer whale attack, returns, much to Hubie's joy. Drake resurfaces to finish the three off, but his efforts bring about the collapse of his tower and he is crushed beneath the rubble. During the escape, Rocko achieves flight and rescues Hubie and Marina.

After bringing them to the ceremony, Rocko reveals to Hubie that he managed to save the pebble and encourages him to give it to Marina. Marina accepts Hubie's proposal, stating that she loves him more than the pebble, and the two become mates. Rocko decides to stay in Antarctica and teaches Hubie and Marina's offspring how to fly.

== Cast ==
- Martin Short as Hubie, a shy and kind-hearted Adélie penguin.
- Annie Golden as Marina, a beautiful female Adélie penguin.
- Jim Belushi as Rocko, a stubborn but loyal Northern rockhopper penguin who dreams of flying.
- Tim Curry as Drake, an arrogant, vindictive and mean-spirited Adélie penguin who wants Marina to be his mate.
- Alissa King as Petra
- Louise Vallance as:
  - Priscilla
  - Chinstrap 2
- Will Ryan as:
  - Royal
  - Tika
- Neil Ross as Scrawny
- Stanley Jones as McCallister
- S. Scott Bullock as:
  - Chubby
  - Gentoo
- Philip L. Clarke as King
- Shani Wallis as the narrator
- B. J. Ward as Magellanic 1
- Hamilton Camp as Megellenic 2
- Angeline Ball as:
  - Gwynne
  - Chinstrap 3
- Kendall Cunningham as Timmy
- Pat Musick as:
  - Pola
  - Chinstrap 1
- Michael Nunes as Beany
- Maggie Roswell as additional voices (uncredited)

== Production ==
=== Conception ===
The Animated Movie Guide said "considering the artistic and financial success of Disney's Beauty and the Beast, Don Bluth and Gary Goldman decided to cater to the dating crowd, in addition to preschoolers". The Pebble and the Penguin was produced by Don Bluth Ireland Limited. Production began in November 1991. The working titles of the film were A Penguin Story and Hubie the Romantic Penguin. In 1994, "Bluth spoke enthusiastically of such pending projects as The Pebble and the Penguin and A Troll in Central Park". The film was originally slated for release in summer 1994 (while Thumbelina was scheduled for November 1993 and A Troll in Central Park was scheduled for March 1994), but due to some production difficulties, the film's release date was changed to April 1995.

=== Animation and research ===
Though Bluth Productions was based in Dublin, artists from Ireland, England and Hungary worked on the project, at least seven directing animators working on the film, among them John Pomeroy. The penguins in the film are clothed. Humans wearing penguin costumes were filmed and then used as photostat references for the animators. The quote from Hubie, "Goodness glaciers!" as well as his overall appearance, is a reference to Gentleman Glacier, an old Canadian newspaper cartoon used to illustrate snow accumulation each year. Only two scenes in the film were "augmented by computer animation", one of which being "The Good Ship Misery" song sequence. The opening credit and overture sequence has the animated penguin characters playing and dancing on the sheet music for the songs in the film. According to The Free Lance–Star, the animators researched for the film by "watching documentaries and visiting zoos, such as San Diego's SeaWorld and Scotland's Glasgow Zoo". The site added that in promotional material, the animators explained they "discovered that the land of snow and ice shines with many different hues". The Pebble and the Penguin is Don Bluth's last feature film to use the traditional hand-painted cel method of animation. Don Bluth's next film, Anastasia, produced at Fox Animation Studios, would use a digital method of coloring and combining scanned drawings similar to Disney's CAPS software, which would eliminate the need for cels, the multiplane camera, and many of the optical effects used for the last time in The Pebble and the Penguin.

=== Post-production ===
During a late stage in the production, MGM insisted for numerous changes to be made to the film, such as removing some characters, trimming down some sequences, scenes being cut from the final product, and having the voices be re-recorded. As a result, the animation, in particular the special effects, fell behind and to make sure the movie made it to the deadline, additional coloring had to be done at Reflex Animation Ltd, a Hungarian animation studio. Don Bluth and Gary Goldman were dissatisfied with the changes MGM was insisting, so they left during production (to help set up Fox Animation Studios) and asked to be uncredited as the directors. The book Animated Films said, "changes at MGM during production...resulted in the project being affected in terms of production value". In a 2001 edition of his magazine Toon Talk, Bluth stated: "Penguin had story problems. We knew it. The crew knew it". Though he attempted to fix these issues when his Irish studio got taken over by the Hong Kong company Media Assets, "the story and film were now compromised", so neither he nor Goldman stayed. They had their names removed from the film's credits and accepted an offer by Bill Mechanic – 20th Century Fox's then-president – to set up a new animation studio in the US (which would become Fox Animation Studios). Bluth said to his animation crew, "I can't chew with someone else's mouth". Despite this executive interference, The Animated Movie Guide noted MGM/UA producer Walter Mirisch's comments on the film: "I think it's one of Don's best films ever...There's no issue of our claiming the credit for this. It's his film".

== Music ==
The Pebble and the Penguin

Soundtrack album by Barry Manilow, Mark Watters and various artists
- Released: April 11, 1995
- Studios: Windmill Lane Recording Studios; Group Four
- Genres: Film score; soundtrack
- Length: 46:40
- Label: Kid Rhino
- Producer: Barry Manilow

Barry Manilow, Mark Watters and various artists chronology
A Troll in Central Park (1994)	The Pebble and the Penguin (1995)	Anastasia (1997)

The songs were written by Barry Manilow, who previously wrote the songs for Thumbelina, along with longtime collaborator and lyricist Bruce Sussman. The film's score was composed by Mark Watters. Manilow, who had "started off wanting to be a composer", got an opportunity to do this when he was approached to "compose songs and the underscore" for the film and Thumbelina. The songs and score for the soundtrack were both performed by the Irish Film Orchestra and the Irish Chamber Choir. Barbadian singer Geoffrey Holder sang the deleted song "The Beachmaster" for the film.

An accompanying soundtrack was released on April 11, 1995. This soundtrack is currently out of print. The soundtrack includes various artists with actors singing their parts for the film, including Martin Short, Annie Golden, Tim Curry, and James Belushi among others. The album was given a rating of 2 1/2 stars at Allmusic.com. Reviewer Peter Fawthrop wrote: "Barry Manilow's soundtrack would have upped the mediocrity on a better project, but The Pebble and the Penguin as a film was conceived with such dismal effort from the then struggling Don Bluth studio that the songs and score work on a somewhat passing level".

The version of "Now and Forever" sung by Barry Manilow and Sheena Easton during the film's end credits is not on the soundtrack, but was later put on Barry Manilow's album Duets and a later reissue of this soundtrack as a bonus track when Kid Rhino re-acquired the rights to the soundtrack in 2012.

=== Songs ===
Original songs performed in the film include:

No.	Title	Performer(s)	Length
1.	"Now and Forever"	Annie Golden & Chorus	5:19
2.	"Sometimes I Wonder"	Martin Short	4:17
3.	"The Good Ship Misery"	Neil Ross, Will Ryan, Philip L. Clarke & Chorus	2:37
4.	"Don't Make Me Laugh"	Tim Curry	2:07
5.	"Sometimes I Wonder (Reprise)"	Annie Golden	2:29
6.	"Looks Like I Got Me a Friend"	Martin Short & Jim Belushi	3:30
7.	"Now and Forever (Finale)"	Chorus	1:04
8.	"Now and Forever (End Credits Version)"	Barry Manilow & Sheena Easton	4:13

== Release ==
=== Theatrical ===
The Pebble and the Penguin was released in the United States and Canada on April 12, 1995. When the film was nearing completion, Metro-Goldwyn-Mayer Pictures purchased the distribution rights in North America, while Warner Bros. under its Family Entertainment label obtained the foreign distribution rights.

=== Marketing ===
The film's tagline was "The adventure of a lifetime begins with one small pebble". Seventy-five readers of the San Antonio Express-News each won four tickets to the film. The special showing was held at 11 a.m. on April 8 at the Embassy Theater in San Antonio. The Pebble and the Penguin was cross-promoted with Anheuser-Busch's Sea World Parks.

=== Driving Mr. Pink ===
The Pebble and the Penguin was accompanied in North American theaters by a new Pink Panther short entitled Driving Mr. Pink, which was adapted from an episode of the successful Pink Panther TV series (though The Pebble and the Penguin was accompanied by a Looney Tunes short entitled Carrotblanca internationally). The short was produced and directed by Paul Sabella, and was co-directed by David Feiss, who would go on to create Cow and Chicken and I Am Weasel. The short also featured the character of Voodoo Man from the 1995 TV show. It is a late one-off short in the Pink Panther short series – they were abundant and popular until 1980.

== Reception ==
=== Box office ===
The Pebble and the Penguin grossed a little over $3.9 million against a $28 million budget The film became popular among fans and audiences of Bluth's films and later gained a cult following through home video releases.

=== Critical reception ===
One of animator Don Bluth's lesser efforts, The Pebble and the Penguin is cute but little more. The primary culprit is the script; aside from the unusual setting and small parcels of information about Emperor penguins, is hackneyed and uninvolving. The decision to focus on the relationship between Hubie and Rocko (while relegating the leading female character to nothing more than a trite damsel-in-distress role) is unfortunate, as the writers bring nothing new to the "buddy" concept and their attempts at humorous dialogue for the pair are often painful. With the exception of a song that pays homage to Bertolt Brecht and Kurt Weill, the Barry Manilow-Bruce Sussman songs are even worse. Bluth is incapable of creating bad animation, and there are several sequences (especially those taking place underwater) that have moments of beauty; overall, however, the animation doesn't have enough sparkle to breathe life into the movie. The cast is certainly not at fault, with Martin Short doing everything short of bursting through the screen to hold the viewer's attention, Tim Curry turning in a reliably sinister performance, and Annie Golden lending her powerful and unique belt to the little she is given to sing. Penguin is not totally without charm -- but the amount it has could almost be fit into a pebble.

— A review of the film by Craig Butler on AllMovie, concisely summing up the general consensus among reviews.

Upon release, the film was widely panned by critics. On Rotten Tomatoes the film has a rating of 31% based on 13 reviews, with an average rating of 4.4/10. The film was given a Two Thumbs Down rating on Siskel & Ebert, with Gene Siskel noting that the film's animation looks "cheap and unfinished" and that "none of the songs are memorable"; Roger Ebert added his dislike of the "dumb songs", "silly story", and the film's color-coding of its heroes and villains, noting the lighter color scheme of Hubie when compared to Drake. The latter took this a step further by arguing: "What do kids learn from this? Nothing overt. Just a quiet, unstated impression: White is good and brave, and brown is scheming and negative. Reinforce that through lots of cartoons (examples: Aladdin and The Rescuers Down Under) and no wonder even black children choose white dolls in some psychological experiments". The Salt Lake City-based Deseret News said that "the songs are forgettable, the story one-note and the characterizations quite weak". Louis Black of The Austin Chronicle said the film "lacks dramatic structure and narrative drive: Songs and animated action pieces are narratively connected but the film doesn't feel as though it is an organic whole. All the elements are here, they just don't come together". Time Out wrote that "the characterisations are weak and unendearing. Worse, the big 'action' sequences turn up with the pacing and predictability of clock chimes. And, in what is perhaps the last great medium for musicals, the perfunctoriness of Barry Manilow's songs and arrangements seem guaranteed to put off yet another generation". Caryn James of The New York Times wrote that four would be "the optimum age for viewers of this gentle, animated musical", adding that "the action seems flat and low-rent compared to those earlier movies", and that it "doesn't have the vivid characters, first-rate animation or sense of adventure that turns movies like The Lion King into endlessly watchable favorites".

Washington Post film critic Hal Hinson wrote that "the banality of the story, the pallid look, the flatness of the characters add up to a product that is, at best, second rate". Peter Stack of the San Francisco Chronicle said that the "gnashing whale scenes are intense enough to push the G-rating envelope". Dan Webster of The Spokesman-Review in Spokane wrote that the film "is only an average effort in virtually every respect". The Record said "the orchestration is too fancy, too loud and often drowns out the lyrics. This is a kid's movie, but musically it sounds like a full-costume Broadway show with full-supporting chorus line. It's a little disturbing to see a children's movie that perpetuates the erroneous image of killer whales as violent creatures. It is, however, a perfect indication of the limited imagination which went into writing The Pebble and the Penguin". Jane Sumner of The Dallas Morning News said the film got a "charming mating ritual" and turned into "sappy action romance with celebrity voices". The book Contemporary North American Film Directors suggested that the film suffered from containing elements of "the same unimaginative and clichéd Disney of the 1970s that Bluth had been so critical of". The Animated Movie Guide said that "the hero was a stuttering wimp, the songs didn't advance the plot, the dialogue was incessant and superfluous, and the pacing was plodding and dull", and also said the film was an "utter waste of talent and resources", due to interference from external forces.

Some critics did praise various aspects of the film, particularly in regard to Bluth's animation. These reviews, however, were almost exclusively mixed. Common Sense Media said that "the background animation of capricious weather conditions is lovely, as are the top-notch original songs by Barry Manilow and Mark Watters". The Deseret News wrote: "Bluth's strength continues to be colorful, classical-style animation, and there are some gorgeous moments here — especially some underwater sequences". The Austin Chronicle wrote: "The Pebble and the Penguin features some beautifully animated sequences [...] The characters are great and the voice talents of Martin Short...and James Belushi...are terrific". Variety said the film has a "heartwarming story, some lively songs and professional animation", adding that it is "a sweet, enjoyable romantic tale more likely to succeed as an afternoon diversion on home video than on the big screen". James wrote "the tunes Mr. Manilow has written for the movie are, like his familiar pop standards, bouncy and catchy", and commented that "the animation is fine". Hinson wrote that "a flourishing opening number—titled 'Here and Now'—proves that Short can belt out a song with the best of them", adding that the "Bluth studio style of animation is passable, and, in the case of a Brecht-Weill flavored production number, occasionally inspired".

Stack described the "show-tune-style songs" as "pleasant but forgettable", adding that "the singing by Short, Belushi, Curry and Broadway belter Golden is the best thing about the film". It also noted that "one of the obvious obstacles was how to color a film whose natural shadings tend toward black, white and degrees of gray. The result is a lot of odd but fascinating colorations -- the sky might turn up yellow at times, or the sea a deep maroon". Webster wrote: "In an era when G-rated movies are as rare as Hollywood humility, any attempt at family entertainment should be lauded", adding "let us salute Don Bluth and his team of animators". In a rare case, The Daily Gazette in Schenectady gave the film 4 stars. Monica Sullivan of Movie Magazine International noted that the film was "heartily enjoyed by the two little girls who saw it with me at a kiddie matinee".

=== Awards ===
The 2007 DVD release of The Pebble and the Penguin was nominated for a Satellite Award for "Best Youth DVD" from the International Press Academy but was beaten by Pixar's Ratatouille.

Year	Nominee / work	Award	Result
2007	The Pebble and the Penguin	Satellite Award for Best Youth DVD	Nominated

== Home media ==
The Pebble and the Penguin was released on VHS and LaserDisc by MGM/UA Home Video on August 15, 1995.

Throughout 1997, songs from the film were released alongside others from the MGM vaults in four MGM Sing-Along cassettes released by MGM/UA Home Video. The loosely themed tapes had titles such as "Searching for Your Dreams", "Having Fun", and "Being Happy". The Pebble and the Penguin was first released by MGM Home Entertainment on DVD on January 19, 1999.

A "Family Fun Edition" of the film was released only in the United States and Canada on March 27, 2007, by 20th Century Fox Home Entertainment. Though they were initially unsatisfied with how the film turned out, Don Bluth and Gary Goldman returned to supervise the restoration for the "Family Fun Edition", which features color corrections, refielded scenes to hide missing effects and correct other errors from the theatrical release.

The 2007 DVD release of The Pebble and the Penguin was, according to The Hindu News, a part of a wave of penguin-related media consisting of March of the Penguins, Happy Feet, Farce of the Penguins and Surf's Up. This trend was also picked up on by The Paramas Post and The Age. In 2010, the film was re-released, along with Rock-a-Doodle, as a double-sided DVD, but the print used was the un-restored 1999 DVD.

The film was released on Blu-ray for the first time on October 11, 2011.
