= Don Bluth Entertainment =

Irish-American animation studio (1979–1995)

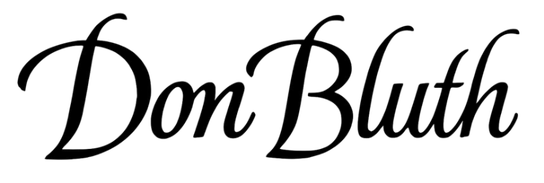

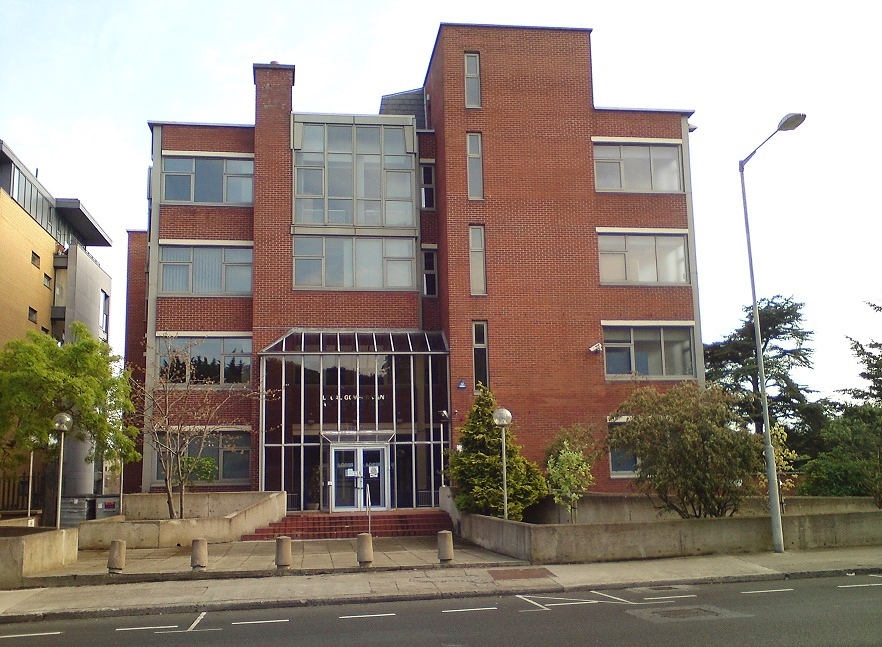
- Local Government Management Agency in Dublin, Ireland is the former home of Sullivan Bluth Studios.
- Formerly: Don Bluth Productions (1979–1983); Bluth Group (1983–1985); Sullivan Bluth Studios Ireland Limited (1985–1992); Don Bluth Ireland Limited (1992–1995); Screen Animation Ireland Limited (1995)
- Type: Private
- Industry: Animation
- Founded: September 13, 1979; 47 years ago (as Don Bluth Productions)
- Founder: Don Bluth
- Defunct: October 31, 1995; 31 years ago (bankruptcy)
- Fate: Don Bluth Ireland Limited assets folded into Fox Animation Studios
- Headquarters: 16134 Hart Street, Van Nuys, California, United States
- Key people: Don Bluth; Gary Goldman; John Pomeroy; Morris Sullivan
- Products: Animated feature films
- Owners: Media Assets; Don Bluth; Morris Sullivan
- Number of employees: 350 at peak

Don Bluth Entertainment (formerly Sullivan Bluth Studios) was an Irish-American animation studio established in 1979 by animator Don Bluth. Bluth and several colleagues, all of whom were former Disney animators, left Disney on September 13, 1979, to form Don Bluth Productions, later known as the Bluth Group. The studio produced the short film Banjo the Woodpile Cat, the feature film The Secret of NIMH, a brief animation sequence in the musical Xanadu, and the video games Dragon's Lair and Space Ace. Bluth then co-founded Sullivan Bluth Studios with American businessman Gary Goldman, John Pomeroy and Morris Sullivan in 1985.

The studio had initially operated from an animation facility in Van Nuys, California, and negotiated with Steven Spielberg and Amblin Entertainment to produce the animated feature An American Tail. During its production, Sullivan began to move the studio to Dublin, Ireland, to take advantage of government investment and incentives offered by the Industrial Development Authority (IDA). Most of the staff from the US studio moved to the new Dublin facility during production on the studio's second feature film, The Land Before Time. The studio also recruited heavily from Ireland, and helped set up an animation course at Ballyfermot College of Further Education to train new artists.

After The Land Before Time, the studio severed its connection with Amblin and negotiated with UK-based Goldcrest Films, which invested in and distributed two additional features, All Dogs Go to Heaven and Rock-a-Doodle. In 1989, during the production of All Dogs Go to Heaven, founding member John Pomeroy and many of the remaining American staff members returned to the United States to form a satellite studio in Burbank, California. The studio found itself in financial difficulty in 1992 when Goldcrest withdrew funding due to concerns about the poor box office returns of its most recent films and budgetary over-runs in its in-production films, Thumbelina, A Troll in Central Park and The Pebble and the Penguin. A British film company, Merlin Films, and Hong Kong media company Media Assets invested in the studio to fund the completion and release of the three partially completed films.

Bluth and Goldman were drawn away from the studio when they were approached in late 1993 to set up a new animation studio for 20th Century Fox. Sullivan Bluth Studio's films continued to suffer losses at the box office, and the studio was closed down on October 31, 1995, after the release of their final feature, The Pebble and the Penguin. Don Bluth and Gary Goldman went on to head up Fox Animation Studios in Phoenix, Arizona to work on Anastasia, Bartok the Magnificent and Titan A.E.. After this, the studio was closed and folded into 20th Century Fox Animation.

== History ==
=== Early history and early troubles (1979–1984) ===
On September 13, 1979, Don Bluth, an animator and animation director at Walt Disney Productions, fellow animators John Pomeroy and Gary Goldman, and eight other animation staff left the studio during production on The Fox and the Hound. Bluth cited as his reasons dissatisfaction with the studio's stifling bureaucracy and its "churn 'em out" attitude to filmmaking. Bluth, Pomeroy and Goldman had been working for four years prior to leaving Disney on a project of their own, Banjo the Woodpile Cat. Upon leaving Disney, they and the other defecting animators formed the independent studio Don Bluth Productions, working out of Bluth's garage and home in Ventura, California, and made the completion of this short film their first project. After four years of production, much of it part-time, Banjo the Woodpile Cat was completed and given theatrical screenings in two theatres in December 1979. The short was then offered to various television stations, airing on HBO in February 1980 and ABC in 1982.

After the completion of Banjo, the studio moved out of Bluth's house and into a two-storey facility in nearby Studio City. The studio's first commission was to produce a two-minute animated sequence for the song "Don't Walk Away" in the live-action musical Xanadu. The brief sequence might ordinarily have taken four or five months to produce, though Bluth's studio completed it in under three. The studio then started work on its first feature film, an adaptation of the Newbery Medal-winning children's book Mrs. Frisby and the Rats of NIMH. Backed by Aurora Productions, The Secret of NIMH started production in 1980 and was completed and released in 1982. Though generally well-received by critics, who praised the richness and fluidity of the animation, some found the narrative unsatisfying. The Secret of NIMH earned $12 million in the United States, which was blamed on distributor MGM/UA's poor promotion, regionally staggered releases and competition from E.T. the Extra-Terrestrial, which had been released the previous month (which most likely brought NIMH into near-obscurity). Between this and an industry-wide animators strike in 1982, the studio found itself in financial trouble and filed for bankruptcy.

Reforming under the name Bluth Group, the studio's next project was to produce the animation for Cinematronics' arcade video games Dragon's Lair and Space Ace, both released in 1983. The games were very successful, attracting considerable attention for the animated visuals quite unlike the simplistic graphics of other games of the era, but were criticized for their limited interactivity. The collapse of the video game industry in late 1983 and early 1984 halted production on the sequel Dragon's Lair II: Time Warp. Cinematronics, now in debt and trying to cut its own losses, froze fees and royalties of over US$3 million to Bluth Group, driving the studio once again into bankruptcy. The unfinished sequel to Dragon's Lair, despite having almost all of its animated footage completed, remained unreleased until 1991.

=== Amblin and Spielberg / Sullivan Bluth (1984–1988) ===
During Bluth Group's period working with Cinematronics, Don Bluth met Morris Sullivan, a mergers and acquisitions broker and enthusiast of traditional animation, who quickly saw the potential in the studio. When the studio declared its second bankruptcy, Sullivan stepped in to assist, combining his experience of the business world with Bluth and his crew's talent to form Sullivan Studios (later becoming Sullivan Bluth Studios). Moving out of the smaller Studio City facility and into a dedicated building in Van Nuys, California, the studio opened in 1985.

In its early days, the studio worked on undeveloped projects—which included Beauty and the Beast and Satyrday—and commercials while seeking a suitable feature film project. In 1984, as the studio was preparing to move to its new headquarters, Bluth was approached by Steven Spielberg with an idea for a feature film about a mouse family emigrating to America, An American Tail. Bluth and Spielberg worked together to develop the story for the film, and production began in earnest later that year. With backing from Spielberg's production company Amblin Entertainment, and distributors Universal Pictures, the film was released in November 1986, accompanied by a major publicity campaign. An American Tail was very successful at the box-office, grossing $47 million in the United States and becoming the highest-grossing animated film during its initial release.

During production on An American Tail, Morris Sullivan drew plans to move the majority of the studio's operations to Ireland to take advantage of a scheme set up by the Industrial Development Authority encouraging filmmakers to invest in the country by offering grants, tax benefits, and lower operating costs. Difficulties with American trade unions that arose when Bluth offered his employees wages below union rates during the financially tense production of An American Tail may also have influenced the decision to relocate. The IDA offered Sullivan Bluth Studios the largest grant in the country's history to relocate to Dublin, in return for a 5% government ownership of the studio. This, along with Sullivan's own investment, funded the foundation of a large and sophisticated new animation studio near Dublin's Phoenix Park. The studio opened with a staff of 85, mostly handling the ink-and-paint process, but expanded to employ over 300 people, including some 100 staff relocated from the California studio, and to cover all aspects of the animation process and even film processing. To build up this workforce, the studio brought young Irish people to the USA studio to train, and Bluth helped to set up an animation course at the nearby Ballyfermot Senior College. Despite the majority of operations eventually being moved to the Dublin studio, an executive office was retained in Burbank, California to maintain ties with US producers and distributors.

During the move to Ireland, production had started on the studio's second feature, The Land Before Time. Again, Amblin and Spielberg backed the production, with additional input from Star Wars creator George Lucas, a friend of Spielberg's, who had worked with him on the initial story treatment. The film had been rushed into its early production stages even before the release of An American Tail to meet an autumn 1987 release date, a very tight schedule for a feature-length animated film. However, between delays caused by the disruption of the move to Dublin, and the unwillingness of Amblin and Universal to fully commit to the project until An American Tail's release, production fell behind by several months, and it wasn't until spring 1987 that The Land Before Time went into full production.

Spielberg and Lucas's control over the story and production of The Land Before Time was notably greater than with An American Tail; substantial changes to the story were imposed mid-production, and around 10 minutes of footage, an expenditure for the studio of over $1 million, was removed. Production was completed in 1988 for a November release, the film vying for box-office receipts with Disney's Oliver & Company. The Land Before Time received positive reviews from film critics and broke the record for the highest-grossing animated film on its opening weekend, and would have retained the record for highest overall gross ($48 million) had Oliver & Company not surpassed it ($53 million).

=== Diversification (1987–1989) ===
During the production of The Land Before Time, Morris Sullivan detailed plans to diversify the studio's output into other areas. In late 1987, a further $4.5 million was invested in improvements to the studio as part of a plan to move into television. At around the same time, plans were also announced to go into live-action film production, and to purchase a film distribution company to distribute not only the studio's own in-house output but also other outside Irish productions, and Michael T. Murphy was hired by Don Bluth to head the company's live-action operation and the company would employ more than 300 people, including 90 animators and technicians from America who were transferred from Los Angeles. However, the live-action and distribution plans were put on hold when the studio struck a deal with British producers Goldcrest Films in early 1988 to partially finance and distribute a further three animated films.

Later that year, the plans were revived, along with the possibility of opening a television animation division to produce high-quality Saturday morning cartoons, to be led by former Marvel boss Lee Gunther, but these plans were halted by April 1989. Out of all the plans to diversify, only the studio's commercial animation department was kept, producing advertisements for American and European television. They also formed the video game division Sullivan Bluth Interactive Media to supervise home computer ports and console versions of the Dragon's Lair games.

=== Goldcrest and downturn (1988–1992) ===
During the production of The Land Before Time, development work was already beginning on the studio's next feature. Sullivan had been keen to fund the next feature with a combination of the studio's own revenue and Irish investment, as opposed to Hollywood producers; the deal with Goldcrest (which had an Irish office) would make this possible. Working under Goldcrest also afforded director Bluth more free rein over the development of the story than under Amblin and Spielberg.

Early ideas for a dog-based story starring Burt Reynolds had been mooted after the completion of The Secret of NIMH, but never progressed beyond rough storyboards. The idea was revisited in late 1987 and developed into a feature-length story, titled All Dogs Go to Heaven. The film entered full production in late 1988, following directly on from The Land Before Time.

In 1989, during the production of All Dogs Go to Heaven, Pomeroy and several original crew members left the Dublin studio to return to the United States, setting up a studio in Burbank, California named West Olive, later to become Sullivan Bluth Animation Studios. The new studio handled some of the animation for All Dogs Go to Heaven, as well as some television commercials. The move helped strengthen the studio's presence in the North American market, and early promotion for All Dogs Go to Heaven included a presentation at the 1989 San Diego Comic-Con and sales of animation cels from previous productions. Initially, the new American studio handled only the rough animation, with the drawings then sent to the Dublin studio for cleanup, ink-and-paint, and shooting. As the studio expanded, it took on more and more of the animation process, with the paper animation completed there and sent to Dublin for Xerography and painting.

All Dogs Go to Heaven was completed in late 1989, opening in November. On Pomeroy's insistence, some cuts were made to bring the film down from its initial MPAA rating of PG to a G rating. Like their previous feature, the studio's latest would be going head-to-head against Disney's newest release, this time The Little Mermaid. Critics gave mixed reviews, with some drawing unfavorable comparisons with The Little Mermaid. Commercially, it fell short of the studio's previous two features, grossing $27 million domestically, but it was a great success when released on home video; accompanied by a $13 million advertising campaign, the video sold over three million copies in the first month alone, topping the charts and becoming one of the top-selling VHS releases of all time.

The unspectacular reception for All Dogs Go to Heaven led the studio to reconsider its approach to public relations in hopes to impress the American film critics. For its next feature film, Rock-a-Doodle, a greater emphasis was placed on audience reception. Several screenings of early test footage were held, and changes were made to the film's content to reduce the intensity or suggestiveness of several scenes and broaden its commercial appeal.

Rock-a-Doodle was released on April 3, 1992, and was the last of the studio's films to have Goldcrest involved in its financing; in May 1991, Goldcrest terminated its three-picture deal with Bluth and struck an agreement with fellow animator Richard Rich's Rich Entertainment. The Samuel Goldwyn Company picked up the rights for its distribution in the United States. The production's goal for success failed abysmally (even worse than All Dogs Go to Heaven), as the critical reception was poor to indifferent, and it performed poorly at the box office, grossing just $11.7 million, losing to its apparent competitor, Kroyer Films, Inc./20th Century Fox's FernGully: The Last Rainforest (which grossed over $32 million). The film's poor theatrical performance, along with the loss of financial backing for several other features the studio had in development, led the studio to declare bankruptcy in October 1992. Despite the bankruptcy being reported to have been connected to Rock-a-Doodle's financial performance, it was reported by Variety on November 1, 1992 that Rock-a-Doodle was already successful in its home video sales, having already grossed $28 million through 2 million shipping units.

Rock-A-Doodle was loosely based on the play Chantecler by poet and playwright Edmond Rostand (itself based on a fable popularized by Chaucer in The Canterbury Tales). The idea for an adaptation of Chantecler dates back to the late 1930s at Walt Disney Productions, and was revisited repeatedly in the decades to follow, but never entered production. It was not until 1982 that Bluth, having left Disney, took a similar idea into pre-production, though the project stalled following the collapse of Don Bluth Productions in the same year. As work on All Dogs Go to Heaven neared completion, the idea was revived and Rock-a-Doodle entered production in late 1989.

During production of Rock-a-Doodle, the studio found itself in difficulties again. Following a buyout of Goldcrest, the new owners of the production company, after finding out the end results of their previous film, decided to end its dealings with Sullivan Bluth Studios. Shortly after, Goldcrest took steps to liquidate the studio, claiming it could not pay back a $300,000 loan and other debts. However, the petition was withdrawn and the issue was settled outside court. Though the precise reasons for the withdrawal were not made public, as part of the settlement the ownership of the studio's artwork was turned over to Goldcrest, putting an end to the studio's selling of animation cels. Around this time, Sullivan Bluth was contracted by Hanna-Barbera Productions and Universal Studios to provide animation for The Funtastic World of Hanna-Barbera ride at Universal Studios Florida; they also provided additional services for Hyperion Films' Rover Dangerfield.

In January 1992, Sullivan Bluth Studios renamed itself to Don Bluth Entertainment following Morris Sullivan's retirement.

=== Decline (1992–1995) ===
With Goldcrest's withdrawal, the future of Don Bluth Entertainment was uncertain. Three further films were already well into development; A Troll in Central Park had been in production since mid-1990, Thumbelina since early 1991 and The Pebble and the Penguin since late 1991. The studio's in-development features were going over budget, and the studio's Belgian investors and a Netherlands bank, who had invested heavily in them, suffered financial difficulties as a result and withdrew further funding. The threat of the closure of the studio was raised that month in the Dáil Éireann (the lower house of the Oireachtas, also known as Ireland's national parliament) in the hopes of securing its future. Thirty employees were laid off at the Los Angeles studio, many of the staff at the Dublin studio continued working unpaid, and Don Bluth reportedly met some operating expenses out of his own pocket.

On November 12, 1992, Don Bluth Entertainment found investment from filmmaker John Boorman's production company Merlin Films and Hong Kong-based company Media Assets. Merlin Films and Media Assets invested $14 million to purchase the studio and a further $6 million to acquire the rights to partially completed films A Troll in Central Park and Thumbelina and ensure their completion, with further investment to follow on the third film, The Pebble and the Penguin, then still in early development. A condition of the investment was that Merlin Films and Media Assets would have a close involvement in the management of Don Bluth Entertainment's financial operations, following reports of the studio's past mismanagement. On July 27, 1993, Star TV, the parent company of Media Assets, was purchased by News Corporation, also owner of 20th Century Fox.

Although A Troll in Central Park was closer to completion, Merlin and Media Assets decided that Thumbelina was more likely to be a commercial success, and pressed for its completion and release first. By March 6, 1993, Media Assets became the sole owner of the studio. MGM/UA, who planned to distribute the films in the United States, had already backed off in the wake of Don Bluth Entertainment's bankruptcy, doubtful that the pictures would ever be completed. J&M Entertainment, which was slated to release the films overseas, sold their rights to Media Assets. During Sullivan Bluth's bankruptcy proceedings, the court trustee presented the film to Disney's film distribution unit, Buena Vista Pictures Distribution. The trustee ultimately declined Disney's offer to distribute the film as they were also trying to find a new owner for the studio. Warner Bros. Pictures picked up Thumbelina and subsequent films for worldwide distribution. The film was released on March 30, 1994. Critical reception was generally negative, and the film performed poorly at the box office, grossing just over $11 million.

The studio's next feature suffered a much weaker commercial performance. A Troll in Central Park, almost complete at the time of the Merlin deal, was given a limited regional release on October 7, 1994. Like Thumbelina before it, A Troll in Central Park was poorly received by critics, and it grossed just $71,000. This poor performance has been attributed to Warner Bros.' lack of promotion; there was no television promotion, no advance screenings and only a low-key print campaign. In the July 2001 issue of Bluth's animation magazine Toon Talk, Bluth explained the film's troubled production, faulting his own unwillingness to accept outside input, and lack of time to refine the story, likening the film to "a child [...] born prematurely".

The third of the studio's partially completed features, The Pebble and the Penguin, was also dogged by production difficulties. MGM/UA stepped in to become distributors for the film in the United States, and at a relatively late stage in production insisted on making extensive changes, cutting some sequences, removing some characters, and re-recording many of the voices. The changes meant that the animation, the effects animation in particular, fell behind, and some of the ink-and-paint work had to be farmed out to Hungarian animation studio Reflex Animation Ltd. to meet the release deadline. Directors Bluth and Goldman were so dissatisfied at the enforced changes that they insisted on their names being removed from the credits (though the company name "Don Bluth Limited" remained). The Pebble and the Penguin was released on April 14, 1995, and again made a loss at the box office, grossing almost $4 million in the United States. The film performed better on home video when released that August, becoming a fast seller alongside other animated films released in the same month. Bluth did not remain disassociated with The Pebble and the Penguin, supervising a high-definition remaster on March 27, 2007 that corrected some of the animation and shooting errors caused by the rushed production.

In addition, MGM hired the Dublin studio to work on the animation for their All Dogs Go to Heaven sequel, albeit with no involvement from Bluth himself and no creative input.

=== Closure / Fox Animation Studios (1994–2000) ===
In late 1993, shortly after the Merlin Films/Media Assets deal, founders Bluth and Goldman met with then-President of 20th Century Fox Television, Peter Chernin, and CEO and Chairman of Fox Filmed Entertainment, Bill Mechanic, to discuss the creation of a feature animation division. While Bluth and Goldman wanted to remain at the Dublin studio, arguing that, because Media Assets was owned by Fox's parent company News Corporation, Fox effectively had a working animation studio already, and Mechanic wanted Bluth and Goldman to head up a new studio in Phoenix, Arizona instead. Fox had seen that Bluth's Dublin studio had a seven-year distribution contract with Warner Bros. Pictures, meaning that they would have to give up their distribution fee to a competitor, and it was thus decided to shut down Don Bluth Ireland entirely instead of waiting for the Warner Bros. contract to expire. Bluth and Goldman intended to remain in Ireland to complete work on The Pebble and the Penguin, but when they were forced to make changes to the film, they left the studio and began working with Mechanic to set up Fox Animation Studios.

With the departure of Bluth and Goldman, Media Assets received offers to have the Dublin studio sold off and delayed the company's closure to consider them. After the release of The Pebble and the Penguin on April 14, 1995, the studio was renamed to Screen Animation Ireland Limited as they could no longer use Bluth's name while US branches were dissolved. New York-based investor Richard McDonald was in serious talks to acquire the studio but negotiations broke down in September 1995 after his group was unable to propose a substantial deal. This gave Media Assets the initiative to finally close the studio on October 31, 1995. Work on All Dogs Go to Heaven 2 was aborted, forcing MGM to farm out the remaining scenes to different animation houses, and rest of the staff moved to the new Fox Animation studio.

Working at the new Arizona animation facility, Bluth and Goldman co-directed Fox Animation Studio's first film, Anastasia, released on November 21, 1997, a 1999 direct-to-video prequel Bartok the Magnificent and Titan A.E., released on June 16, 2000. Titan A.E. grossed just $22.7 million against its estimated budget of $75 million; Fox Animation Studios had already laid off two-thirds of its staff several months previously, and it closed entirely shortly after Titan A.E.'s release.

== Influence ==
The departure on September 13, 1979, of animators Bluth, Goldman and Pomeroy, along with a further four animators and four assistant animators from Disney's feature animation studio, caused a considerable disturbance in the animation industry. The eleven animators who left represented about 17% of the studio's animation staff, a loss that delayed the release of The Fox and the Hound by six months. Ron W. Miller, the future president and future CEO of The Walt Disney Company at the time, remarked that although the timing of their departure was unfortunate, it was "possibly the best thing that could happen to our animation group". Bluth expressed concerns that as Disney's productions became more technically advanced, the story seemed to lose importance. The aim of his new studio was to "return animation to its glorious past", concentrating on strong stories, and using traditional animation techniques that had fallen out of favor at Disney. Animation historian Jerry Beck observed that Don Bluth Productions was clearly set up in direct opposition to Disney; even Aurora Productions, who backed the studio's first feature, The Secret of NIMH, was made up of former Disney executives.

While Bluth's early output did not match Disney's success at the box office, critics praised the studio's visual style, and by 1986 Sullivan Bluth Studios' An American Tail had broken the box-office record for a first-release animated feature. As animation columnist Jim Hill notes, this critical and commercial reception forced Disney to rethink its approach to animated features. Throughout the 1980s, Disney strove to revitalize its output, and while the next feature after Bluth's departure, The Black Cauldron, was a commercial and critical failure (attributed by Hill to the use of the latest animation technology at the expense of the story), the films that followed (The Great Mouse Detective and Oliver & Company) marked the beginning of a period of increasing success for the studio in the late 1980s and early 1990s, with each successive film earning 40–50% more than its predecessor, culminating in The Lion King earning nearly $800 million worldwide in 1994.

Sullivan Bluth Studios has also been regarded as a major influence in the development of Ireland's animation industry. Animator Jimmy Murakami had been operating his studio Murakami Films in Ireland throughout the 1980s, and the opening of Sullivan Bluth Studios brought about expansion in the sector, with Murakami Films expanding to become Murakami-Wolf Dublin (later Fred Wolf Films Dublin), and another studio of American origins, Emerald City, opening in Dublin. By 1990, Dublin's animation industry employed around 530 people.

Sullivan Bluth Studios was also instrumental in setting up education programmes in Dublin to train new artists and animators. At the Ballyfermot Senior College an animation department was set up, modelled on the school of Art and Design at Sheridan College, Ontario, Canada. Many of Ballyfermot's graduates went on to work at Sullivan Bluth and the city's other animation studios. In 1989, around 75% of the 350 staff employed at the Dublin studio were Irish, and by late 1990, most of the original American crew had returned to the United States to be replaced by Irish artists and animators. Some senior staff at the studio became part-time instructors at the college. The success of the animation course at Ballyfermot spurred the creation of an animation programme at Dún Laoghaire Institute of Art, Design and Technology, focused more on experimental and arthouse techniques compared to Ballyfermot's traditional animation approach.

The closure of Sullivan Bluth Studios on October 31, 1995, brought about a near collapse in the Irish animation industry. Emerald City closed soon after, and Fred Wolf Films Dublin downsized. By 1997, the industry's annual turnover had dropped from around £12 million to just £100,000. The industry began to recover as numerous smaller animation studios were set up. Several former Sullivan Bluth employees started studios of their own, including Brown Bag Films, Monster Animation and Design and Terraglyph Animation. The animation sector in Ireland has grown to become a very successful industry as indigenous studios have all produced films and TV series for international markets.

== Filmography ==
=== Feature films ===
#	Title	Release date	Director(s)	Story by	Screenplay by	Producer(s)	Distributor	Budget	Box office	Rotten Tomatoes	Metacritic	Notes
1	The Secret of NIMH	July 2, 1982	Don Bluth	Don Bluth, John Pomeroy, Gary Goldman, and Will Finn	—N/a	Don Bluth, Gary Goldman, and John Pomeroy	MGM/UA (North America); United International Pictures (International)	$6.3 million	$14,665,733	93%	76 (15 reviews)	Don Bluth's first independent feature film after leaving Walt Disney Productions.
2	An American Tail	November 21, 1986	Don Bluth	David Kirschner, Judy Freudberg, and Tony Geiss	Judy Freudberg and Tony Geiss	Don Bluth, Gary Goldman, and John Pomeroy	Universal Pictures	$9 million	$84,542,002	71%	38 (7 reviews)	First feature film with Amblin Entertainment.
3	The Land Before Time	November 18, 1988	Don Bluth	Judy Freudberg and Tony Geiss	Stu Krieger	Don Bluth, Gary Goldman, and John Pomeroy	Universal Pictures	$12 million	$84,460,846	70%	66 (15 reviews)	Second and last feature film with Amblin Entertainment.
4	All Dogs Go to Heaven	November 17, 1989	Don Bluth	Don Bluth, Ken Cromar, Gary Goldman, Larry Leker, Linda Miller, Monica Parker, John Pomeroy, Guy Schulman, David J. Steinberg, and David N. Weiss	David N. Weiss	Don Bluth, Gary Goldman, and John Pomeroy	MGM/UA (North America); Rank Film Distributors (United Kingdom)	$13.8 million	$27,100,027	44%	50	Last Don Bluth film to be shot in open matte.
5	Rock-a-Doodle	April 3, 1992	Don Bluth	Don Bluth, John Pomeroy, David J. Steinberg, David N. Weiss, T.J. Kuenster, and Gary Goldman	David N. Weiss	Don Bluth, Gary Goldman, and John Pomeroy	The Samuel Goldwyn Company (North America); Rank Film Distributors (United Kingdom)	$18 million	$11,657,385	20%	N/A	Only live-action/animated film by Don Bluth and only Don Bluth film to be created using two dual aspect ratios, with all animated sequences still shot in open matte, while the live-action portions were shot in widescreen.
6	Thumbelina	March 30, 1994	Don Bluth and Gary Goldman	—N/a	Don Bluth	Don Bluth, Gary Goldman, and John Pomeroy	Warner Bros. Pictures	$28 million	$11,373,501	40%	N/A	First Don Bluth film to be in widescreen and first film to be directed by the studio's co-founder Gary Goldman.
7	A Troll in Central Park	October 7, 1994	Don Bluth and Gary Goldman	Don Bluth, Gary Goldman, John Pomeroy, T.J. Kuenster, and Stu Krieger	Stu Krieger	Don Bluth, Gary Goldman, and John Pomeroy	Warner Bros. Pictures	N/A	$71,368	14%	N/A	—N/a
8	The Pebble and the Penguin	April 12, 1995	Don Bluth and Gary Goldman	—N/a	Rachel Koretsky and Steven Whitestone	Russell Boland, Don Bluth, Gary Goldman, and John Pomeroy	MGM/UA (North America); Warner Bros. Pictures (International)	$28 million	$3,983,912	31%	N/A	The studio's final feature film and last Don Bluth film to use traditional cels, starting with his next film Anastasia, Don Bluth would start using digital ink and paint.

=== Short film ===
- Banjo the Woodpile Cat (1979; animated short)

=== Animation service ===
- Xanadu (1980; animated sequence)
- When the Wind Blows (1986; additional trace and paint services)
- The Chipmunk Adventure (1987; additional animation)
- The Funtastic World of Hanna-Barbera (1990, ride film for Universal Studios Florida; character animation)
- Rover Dangerfield (1991; ink/paint, production camera and xerox work)
- Kaguya Hime: Princess of the Moon (1991; animated short for Japanese theme park Harmonyland)
- The Thief and the Cobbler (1993; additional visual effects and animation)
- A Man of No Importance (1994; projection theatre)
- All Dogs Go to Heaven 2 (1996; animation) (Note: Only post-Bluth project the Dublin studio worked on prior to shutting down.)

=== Logo idents ===
- PBS Kids (1993; animated P-Pals character & animated sequences created)

=== Cancelled films ===
- Piper, a Disney animated short film that is based on the famous Pied Piper of Hamelin story. While the production for the short was cancelled, a clip of an animation drawing is shown online.
- East of the Sun and West of the Moon, an animated film that was to be produced after The Secret of NIMH, but production was halted due to the 1982 animators' strike.
- Beauty and the Beast, an adaptation of the fairy-tale of the same name. Bluth began development on the project in 1984, and following The Land Before Time, it was expected to be his next film, intending to have it distributed by Columbia Pictures. Both Bluth and Columbia Pictures dropped the project after learning that Disney already announced plans for its own film adaptation, knowing that they would not complete it before Disney's.
- The Velveteen Rabbit, an animated feature based on the story about a toy rabbit and its owner.
- Satyrday, another animated film that Don Bluth was developing prior to An American Tail. Based on the story by Steven Bauer, the story centers on the last human, living in a fantasy world, who goes on a quest to get the moon back from a giant owl. The human teams up with a satyr and a snow-fox to rescue the moon and discover the fate of the human race. Some of the film's concepts were later used in the otherwise unrelated French animated film Mune: Guardian of the Moon.
- The Baby Blue Whale, an animated film which was described as "an underwater Bambi". The story was about a little girl and her animal friends who try to protect a little whale from evil whalers. Throughout the 1980s, Bluth and his team collaborated with screenwriter Robert Towne on the project, but the project was dropped and given entirely to Towne.
- A Song of the Ice Whale, another animated feature film that involves whales caught in the Arctic ice and the efforts from several countries to free them.
- Jawbreaker, a TV mini-series of a boy who finds a magical tooth.
- Quintaglio Ascension, The Belgariad, and The Hitchhiker's Guide to the Galaxy, the projects which became abandoned during the opening of Fox Animation Studios.

=== Video games ===
- Dragon's Lair (1983)
- Space Ace (1984)
- Dragon's Lair II: Time Warp (1991)
- Maelstrom (1992; storyline and concepts)

=== Cancelled video games ===
- The Sea Beast, a video game in the same style as Dragon's Lair and Space Ace, where a 1940s sailor named Barnacle Bill tries to rescue a mermaid princess from a nasty sea beast.
- Jason and the Golden Fleece, another video game in the same style as Dragon's Lair and Space Ace that is based on the famous Greek legend Jason.
- Devil's Island, a video game where a shipwreck passenger tries to find treasure, rescue a jungle princess and take down a corrupt civilization.
- Haywire, where a Charlie Chaplin-like character tries to survive and escape a huge factory run by an evil business man.
- Drac, where Van Helsing has to save his girlfriend from Dracula and his monster minions of evil before she becomes one of his brides.
- Cro Magnon, where a Cro Magnon caveman battles vicious dinosaurs, scary creatures and an evil warlord.
- Sorceress, where a sorceress has to protect her island from temple robbers and poachers.
- Pac-Man Adventures, a partnership with Namco which was later rebranded into Pac-Man World 3 without Bluth's involvement.

== See also ==
- Fox Animation Studios

== Bibliography ==
- Beck, Jerry (2005). The Animated Movie Guide. Chicago Review Press. ISBN 1-55652-591-5.
- Cawley, John (1991). The Animated Films of Don Bluth. Image Pub of New York. ISBN 0-685-50334-8.
- Enterprise Ireland (November 1999). "Opportunities for Ireland in the Media Sector" (PDF). pp. 30–31. Archived from the original (PDF) on February 10, 2005.
- Grant, John (2001). Masters of Animation. B.T. Batsford Ltd. ISBN 0-7134-8628-7.
- Lauria, Larry (September 2000). "A Conversation With The New Don Bluth". Animation World Magazine. Archived from the original on April 23, 2009.
- Lenburg, Jeff (2006). Who's Who in Animated Cartoons: An International Guide to Film and Television's Award-Winning and Legendary Animators. Applause Books. pp. 32–33. ISBN 1-55783-671-X.
- "Adjournment Debate - Animation Film Company Closure". Dáil Éireann – Volume 423 – October 13, 1992. Archived from the original on June 7, 2011.
- "British Film Institute Film & TV Database – Sullivan Bluth Studios". Archived from the original on December 15, 2007.
- "Don Bluth Entertainment Ltd. credit report". Archived from the original on September 28, 2007.
