= Rock-a-Doodle =

1991 film directed by Don Bluth

- Theatrical release poster
- Directed by: Don Bluth
- Screenplay by: David N. Weiss
- Story by: Don Bluth; John Pomeroy; David J. Steinberg; David N. Weiss; T.J. Kuenster; Gary Goldman
- Based on: Chantecler by Edmond Rostand
- Produced by: Don Bluth; Gary Goldman; John Pomeroy
- Starring: Glen Campbell; Eddie Deezen; Sandy Duncan; Ellen Greene; Phil Harris; Christopher Plummer; Charles Nelson Reilly; Toby Scott Ganger
- Cinematography: Robert Paynter
- Edited by: Lisa Dorney; Dan Molina; Fiona Trayler
- Music by: Robert Folk
- Production companies: Goldcrest Films; Sullivan Bluth Studios
- Distributed by: The Samuel Goldwyn Company (United States); Rank Film Distributors (United Kingdom)
- Release dates: 2 August 1991 (United Kingdom); 23 August 1991 (Ireland); 3 April 1992 (United States)
- Running time: 74 minutes
- Countries: Ireland; United Kingdom; United States
- Language: English
- Budget: $18 million
- Box office: $11.6 million

Rock-a-Doodle is a 1991 American-Irish live-action animated musical comedy film directed by Don Bluth, written by David N. Weiss, and released by The Samuel Goldwyn Company. The story, loosely based on Edmond Rostand's 1910 comedy play Chantecler, centers on Chanticleer, a rooster who crows each morning to raise the sun, but leaves his farm life to become a rock and roll singer in the city after being tricked into believing his role is unnecessary. A young boy named Edmond, transformed into a kitten by the villainous Grand Duke of Owls, joins the other farm animals to retrieve Chanticleer and prevent a catastrophic flood caused by endless rainfall. The film features the voices of Glen Campbell, Eddie Deezen, Sandy Duncan, Ellen Greene, Phil Harris (in his final film role), Christopher Plummer, Charles Nelson Reilly, and Toby Scott Ganger.

Produced by Sullivan Bluth Studios Ireland Limited and Goldcrest Films, Rock-a-Doodle was released in the United Kingdom on 2 August 1991 and in the United States and Canada on 3 April 1992. The film received mostly negative reviews and was a box-office failure, grossing $11 million on a budget of $18 million. Nevertheless, it would achieve greater success on home video.

== Plot ==
Chanticleer, a rooster whose singing raises the sun every morning, gets into a fight with the Farmyard Bully sent by the Grand Duke of Owls, whose kind hates sunlight. Chanticleer defeats his attacker, but forgets to crow, and the sun rises anyway. Ridiculed and rejected by the other animals, Chanticleer leaves the farm in shame, and the sun goes back down as Chanticleer had not crowed. Afterward, perpetual darkness and rainfall threaten the farm with flooding.

This story is a fairy tale read to a young boy named Edmond by his mother. Their family's farm is in danger of being destroyed in a storm, and when his mother leaves to assist the rest of the family, Edmond calls for Chanticleer's return. He is instead greeted by the Duke, who is angered by Edmond's interference and uses his magical breath to transform Edmond into a kitten with the intent to eat him. Edmond is saved by Patou, a Basset Hound from Chanticleer's farm, and Edmond manages to drive away the Duke with a flashlight. Edmond then meets several other animals from the farm, all of whom hope to find Chanticleer and apologize to him for their behavior. Edmond accompanies Patou, a cowardly magpie named Snipes, and the intellectual field mouse Peepers, to the city, while the rest of the animals remain at Edmond's house.

The Duke sends his pygmy nephew Hunch to stop Edmond and the others from finding Chanticleer. The group narrowly escapes him and enters the city through an aqueduct pipe. Chanticleer, now under the name of "The King", has become a famous Elvis impersonator under his manager Pinky, a fox who is secretly employed by the Duke to keep Chanticleer in the city and prevent his friends from finding him. During a concert, he is introduced to Goldie Pheasant as a distraction in case Chanticleer's friends come to find him. Goldie soon grows genuinely attracted to Chanticleer, and realizes Pinky's true intentions when he captures Edmond and the others trying to get a letter to Chanticleer. Meanwhile, the Duke and his party stalk the farm animals at Edmond's house, who continually use Edmond's flashlight to drive them off as long as the batteries hold out. Realizing that she is in love with him, Goldie confesses to Chanticleer that his friends have come to see him. Pinky blackmails Chanticleer into attending his show by holding his friends hostage. Hunch inadvertently frees Edmond and the others, and they help Chanticleer and Goldie make a grand escape in a helicopter, which they use to return to the farm.

After their batteries run out, the denizens of the farm are nearly made a meal of by the Duke and his minions when they are driven off by the helicopter's spotlight. Edmond and the others try to get Chanticleer to crow, but his ongoing sense of dejection limits his ability. The Duke taunts Chanticleer and tries to drown him, but Edmond starts chanting Chanticleer's name in hopes of reviving his spirit, enraging the Duke into strangling Edmond unconscious. Inspired by Edmond, the other animals begin chanting Chanticleer's name, driving an angry Duke to transform himself into a tornado. Chanticleer finally regains his confidence and crows loud enough to raise the sun, diminishing the Duke into a harmless miniature version of himself. The floods begin to subside and Edmond transforms back into a human. Edmond awakes in the real world, where the sun is shining outside, and the floods have ended, but Edmond's mother assumes that his adventures were only a dream. Nevertheless, Edmond picks up Chanticleer's book and thanks him for coming back before he is magically transported into Chanticleer's world, where he witnesses the rooster singing to make the sun shine.

== Cast ==
- Glen Campbell as Chanticleer, a rooster who lives on a farm with many other animals, who love him and are fond of him. When the sun rises without his crowing due to the Farmyard Bully's interference, his friends, believing he was lying to them about his crowing bringing up the sun (a fact he himself thought was true), reject him. In a miserable state, he goes to the city and becomes a popular singer. This was Campbell's final film role before his death in 2017.
- Toby Scott Ganger as Edmond, the 8-year-old son of a human farmer in the live-action segment who is being read the story of Chanticleer by his mother Dory. He is transformed into an animated kitten by the Grand Duke after trying to summon back Chanticleer.
- Kathryn Holcomb as Dory, Edmond's mother in the live-action segment who is overprotective of keeping her youngest child safe from the storm. Dory's voice is provided by Dee Wallace.
- Stan Ivar as Frank, Edmond's father in the live-action segment who is a farmer.
- Christian Hoff as Scott, one of Edmond's older brothers in the live-action segment.
- Jason Marin as Mark, one of Edmond's older brothers in the live-action segment.
- Ellen Greene as Goldie, a golden pheasant and singer who is in Pinky's employment. She is initially jealous of Chanticleer for stealing her spotlight but falls in love with him upon becoming more acquainted with him.
- Christopher Plummer as the Grand Duke of Owls, a magical Eurasian eagle-owl who despises Chanticleer. The Duke is a malevolent powerful creature of the night, with a penchant for eating smaller animals as meals and commanding other villainous owls to do his bidding. The Duke possesses magical breath that can transform anyone into any creature.
- Phil Harris as Patou, a Basset Hound who is a good friend to both Chanticleer and Edmond, and is the narrator of the story. He despises the Grand Duke and is dedicated to Edmond's cause to bring Chanticleer back home. This was Harris's final acting role before his retirement from acting and his death in 1995.
- Eddie Deezen as Snipes, a black-billed magpie. Snipes has claustrophobia and despises garbage and dirt.
- Sandy Duncan as Peepers, a mouse. She is initially terrified of Edmond and tries to convince everyone that he used to be a human.
- Charles Nelson Reilly as Hunch, the Duke's pygmy nephew and lead henchman. He carries an all-purpose Swiss Army Knife in a lidless soda can strapped to his back and uses its various bladed objects, tools, and household objects (such as a flyswatter) as weapons.
- Sorrell Booke as Pinky, a fat red fox who loves money and works as Chanticleer's manager in the city. He intends to make sure that Chanticleer never feels the compulsion to return home by convincing him that his friends hate him, making it easy to profit off of Chanticleer's singing skills. This was Booke's final film role before his retirement from acting and his death in 1994.
- Will Ryan as Stuey, a chronically nervous pig from Chanticleer's farm.
- Louise Chamis as Minnie, a rabbit from the farm.
- Bob Gallico as Radio Announcer
- Jake Steinfeld as:
  - The Farmyard Bully, a rooster and minion of the Duke sent by him to stop Chanticleer from crowing.
  - Max, the leader of a group of bouncer frogs who are Pinky's henchmen.
- T. J. Kuenster, Jim Doherty, John Drummond, and Frank Kelly as the Duke's owl henchmen.

== Production ==
=== Development ===
Plans for an animated version of the Chanticleer tale dated as far back as the early years of the Disney studios, where several of its artists were interested in combining elements of the story with those about an anthropomorphic fox named Reynard. Though character designs by Marc Davis survive, Walt Disney personally rejected the pitch in 1961, eventually passing on the project in favor of The Sword in the Stone. Eleven years later, Don Bluth, himself a former Disney animator, had begun pre-production on an fully animated film based on Chanticleer in 1982, before the release of The Secret of NIMH. In 1985, the film was mentioned as being in development limbo. Three years later, as a response to the success of the groundbreaking live-action animated film Who Framed Roger Rabbit, Bluth ultimately revived his proposal, intending to tell the rooster's story through live action and animation. Originally, the story's first and last scenes were to be shot in black and white, similar to 1939's The Wizard of Oz. The film's opening, which took place on a farm, had Edmond's mother reading the book The Story of Chanticleer to him. Victor French, who had directed several episodes of Get Smart and Highway to Heaven, was set to direct these sequences, but terminal lung cancer forced him out of production. Bluth, who had never done anything in this field, took over from this point, but very little of this footage made it in the final cut.

In a 1990 magazine article, Bluth described the plot of the film thusly:

"ROCK-A-DOODLE is a fantasy, something that we just made up. It's about a character named Chanticleer who thinks that when he crows the sun comes up. The truth is, it does; until one day into the farm yard comes another rooster who fights with Chanticleer and keeps him so busy that the sun, who has a habit of coming up every morning at that time, peeks its little head over the hill. Well, Chanticleer has not crowed and when he sees that the sun has come up without him, he's devastated. All the farm yard animals ridicule and laugh at him, so he walks away and says 'I'm nobody'. The sun becomes very upset after that and hides behind the clouds never to come out again. Meanwhile, the rooster goes away to the city and becomes a rock star, very reminiscent of Elvis Presley. The farm yard animals realize they're in trouble because the rains have come, the world's flooding, and there's no more sunshine. So they go to the city and try to bring Chanticleer home to crow".

=== Filming ===
The live-action sequences were done at Ardmore Studios in Dublin, Ireland. When the live-action footage was finished during production, Goldcrest Films recruited Sullivan Bluth Studios to animate the rest of the film. Animation took place in both Burbank, California and Dublin, Ireland. Chanticleer's girlfriend, Goldie the Pheasant, was designed to have attributes similar to Jessica Rabbit from Who Framed Roger Rabbit (as seen in the original trailer). In response to reactions from mothers during test screenings of her scenes, Goldcrest requested that Sullivan Bluth reanimate the scenes by covering her chest with feathers as cel overlays, or simply painting her cleavage out.

=== Aspect ratio ===
The live-action and animation sequences were filmed in two separate aspect ratios. The animation was shot on an open-matte full-screen negative, meaning the top and bottom of the image was cropped to fit the theatre screen along with the new Olive Films DVD and Blu-ray releases. The live-action scenes, including all animated elements, were shot in hard-matted widescreen. When viewed in full-screen (except the theatre screen and the new Olive Films DVD and Blu-ray releases), all the animated sequences (except for parts of the finale) can be seen in full, but the live-action segments lose information on the sides.

=== Post-production ===
To avoid a potential PG rating, Bluth edited out the showing of The Duke's "skunk pie" (the pie is not seen in full view in the final version), the animators had to replace Chanticleer's glass of wine with a transparent cup of soda in the "Kiss and Coo" sequence, and had to draw colored effects into The Grand Duke's breath to make him less scary for young audiences. Test audiences also felt confused by the storytelling so the filmmakers decided to include narration told by the dog character, Patou, voiced by Phil Harris. The crew, because of these changes, had to work overtime to finish the film by Thanksgiving 1990. (Note: The copyright date of 1990 appears in the film's end credits, VHS, DVD, although it was not released until at least a year later.)

== Release ==
The film was originally going to be released by MGM-Pathe Communications in November 1990, but Giancarlo Parretti was mismanaging the studio, so Bluth rescheduled the film for release around Thanksgiving 1991 and selected The Samuel Goldwyn Company as the film's distributor, who had previously released two other animated films (The Care Bears Movie and The Chipmunk Adventure) in 1985 and 1987, respectively. That date was further moved to April 1992 to avoid competition with Walt Disney Pictures and Walt Disney Feature Animation's Beauty and the Beast, as well as Universal Pictures and Amblin Entertainment's An American Tail: Fievel Goes West, a sequel to An American Tail, in which Bluth himself was not involved. The Samuel Goldwyn Company was acquired by MGM in 1998, and as a result, MGM now hold the rights to the film. Prior to the North American theatrical release, a sneak preview of the film was included on the 1990 VHS release of All Dogs Go to Heaven.

Rock-a-Doodle was the first feature-length live-action/animated film since 1988's Who Framed Roger Rabbit, but unlike the live-action characters from that film sharing the screen with animated characters like Roger Rabbit, Edmond is the only live-action character to share the screen with the animated farm animals; this was at the beginning, when The Grand Duke confronts Edmond before turning him into an animated cat, and at the end, where Chanticleer is singing a reprise of Sun Do Shine like he does at the beginning. Bluth chose this direction because he was influenced by Roger Rabbit.

=== Home media history ===
In the United States and Canada, Rock-a-Doodle was first released on VHS and LaserDisc on 18 August 1992, and then on DVD on 20 July 1999 by HBO Video. A second edition was released by MGM Home Entertainment through Sony Pictures Home Entertainment on 8 November 2005.

In 2010, the film was released along with The Pebble and the Penguin as a double-sided DVD. For the 25th anniversary of Rock-a-Doodle's North American release, a third edition was released on DVD and Blu-ray by Olive Films (under license from 20th Century Fox and MGM) on 31 October 2017. That edition marked the film's first widescreen debut in an American home media release. Unlike the previous home media releases, both the new Olive Films DVD and Blu-ray releases were sourced from telecine masters made for PAL, resulting in a slightly higher audio pitch than normal, despite the running time remaining the same as its NTSC counterpart. This even removes the Don Bluth logo and replaces the 1991 Goldcrest logo with that from the original UK release.

A copyright date of 1990 appears in the film's end credits, although it was not released until at least a year later.

== Reception ==
=== Box office ===
The film took in $11,657,385 at the US box office after an opening weekend gross of $2,603,286, which forced Bluth's studio into liquidation half a year after its release. Moreover, a Hong Kong company, Media Assets, purchased Bluth's next three films, Thumbelina (1994), A Troll in Central Park (1994), and The Pebble and the Penguin (1995). All of these did even worse than Rock-a-Doodle commercially despite all doing better critically, though still receiving negative reviews except for A Troll In Central Park which got panned. All of them preceded 1997's Anastasia, his comeback hit. Despite the film's dismal theatrical performance, Rock-a-Doodle did sell quite well once it hit home video, shipping an estimated 2 million units, worth about $28 million gross, by November 1992.

=== Critical reception ===
Rock-a-Doodle received generally negative reviews from critics. Rotten Tomatoes reported that 20% of critics gave the film a positive review based on 15 reviews, with an average score of 4/10. In a positive review, The Washington Post wrote: "The young ones, who certainly don't give a sticky-fingered hoot about animation production values, are likely to have a good time with this. There are many passing delights. Composer T. J. Kuenster has some funny songs. They're not Ashman and Menken (The Little Mermaid songwriting team), but they're sprightly. The best is probably a Bach-like fugue number, in which the Grand Duke and his owlish goons sing "Never Let Him Crow" around a church organ. But in a movie like this, it ain't over till the rooster sings". Empire found it more compelling than Bluth's previous effort All Dogs Go to Heaven, labeling Chanticleer "good-natured kitsch" and praising the film's "successful if unspectacular" live-action/animation mixture and the use of the real-life Jordanaires as backing vocalists.

Halliwell's Film Guide commended its "excellent animation", but complained of the "poor and confusing narrative" that "rendered [it] pointless". Roger Ebert of the Chicago Sun-Times gave the film two stars out of four. In his review, he gave mild praise to the songs and the animation and said the film may entertain younger audiences, but said the film "doesn't feel as bright as it should". He also called the live-action segments unnecessary. Dave Kehr of the Chicago Tribune criticized the film's overwhelming amount of characters and subplots as well as its "frantic" altering in pacing and tone, but acclaimed the hand-drawn animation, calling it superior to the "shabby rotoscoping techniques" of Beauty and the Beast (1991). Hartford Courant reviewer Malcolm L. Johnson, while feeling that Rock-a-Doodle lacked a story, highlighted its "technical feats" in animation, such as the use of live action and moments where the animation "zoomps us through layers of action, as though a camera were riding on the back of a freewheeling bird". He also praised the voice acting and "witty" take of the "Bach vs. rock" story.

Charles Soloman, a critic for the Los Angeles Times, disliked the film's writing, reasoning that it was filled with plot holes, forced "fun" elements, and rejection of the source material's "powerful message about the importance of self-knowledge". He also criticized its cheap-looking special effects: "The Grand Duke's magic breath sprays twinkling stars and crescent moons that look like the glitter sold by the scoop in card shops. The matte lines are clearly visible in the final live-action/animation scenes, and a weird glow suffuses the entire sequence, as if it had been shot at Chernobyl". Entertainment Weekly panned Rock-a-Doodle's "limp rock homages", forgettable song, "washed-out" colors, and the "cheap" look of the live-actions sequences.

In 2011, Total Film ranked it as 24th among the 50 worst children's films ever made.

== Music ==
Rock-a-Doodle: Music from the Original Soundtrack

Soundtrack album by Glen Campbell and various artists
- Released: 13 April 1992
- Studios: The Music Mill; Ropewalk Studios; Devonshire Studios; Ringsend Road Studios
- Genre: Soundtrack
- Length: 20:38
- Label: Liberty
- Producers: T.J. Kuenster; Robert Folk; Nicky Moss

Professional ratings
Review scores
Source	Rating
AllMusic	1.5/5 stars

The soundtrack for Rock-a-Doodle was composed by Robert Folk and performed by the Irish Film Orchestra, with songs written and produced by T.J. Kuenster, one of the songwriters for All Dogs Go to Heaven. Background vocals on "We Hate the Sun", "Tweedle Le Dee", and "The Owls' Picnic" were all sung by a triple-tracked Kuenster himself. The tracks "Sun Do Shine", "Come Back to You", "Rock-a-Doodle", "Treasure Hunting Fever", "Sink or Swim", "Kiss 'n Coo", and "Tyin' Your Shoes" contained background vocals by The Jordanaires.

The soundtrack is the forty-ninth album by American singer/guitarist Glen Campbell, released in 1992. Campbell voiced the main character. The soundtrack was recorded at The Music Mill, Nashville; Ropewalk Studios, Dublin, Ireland; and Devonshire Audio, Los Angeles. It was produced by T.J. Kuenster, Robert Folk, and Nicky Moss. The album was released on the Liberty Records label.

=== Songs ===
All tracks are written by T.J. Kuenster:

No.	Title	Performer(s)	Length
1.	"Sun Do Shine"	Glen Campbell
2.	"We Hate the Sun"	Christopher Plummer
3.	"Come Back to You"	Glen Campbell
4.	"Rock-a-Doodle"	Glen Campbell
5.	"The Bouncer's Song"	The Don Bluth Players
6.	"Tweedle Le Dee"	Christopher Plummer
7.	"Treasure Hunting Fever"	Glen Campbell
8.	"Sink or Swim"	Ellen Greene
9.	"Kiss 'n Coo"	Glen Campbell & Ellen Greene
10.	"Back to the Country"	Glen Campbell
11.	"The Owls' Picnic"	Christopher Plummer
12.	"Tyin' Your Shoes"	Phil Harris & Toby Scott Ganger

== Merchandise ==
A novelization of the film, written by Don Bluth and Chip Lovitt, was published by Troll Communications LLC (ISBN 0-8167-2475-X). The film also inspired a Computerized Coloring Book by Capstone Software and IntraCorp called The Rock-A-Doodle Computerized Coloring Book.

== See also ==
- List of animated feature-length films
- Twice Upon a Time
