= Thumbelina (1994 film) =

American animated film by Don Bluth and Gary Goldman

- Theatrical release poster by John Alvin.
- Directed by: Don Bluth; Gary Goldman
- Screenplay by: Don Bluth
- Based on: Thumbelina by Hans Christian Andersen
- Produced by: Don Bluth; Gary Goldman; John Pomeroy
- Starring: Jodi Benson; Barbara Cook; Carol Channing; Gilbert Gottfried; Charo; John Hurt; Gino Conforti; Gary Imhoff; Joe Lynch
- Edited by: Fiona Trayler
- Music by: Barry Manilow; William Ross
- Production company: Don Bluth Ireland Limited
- Distributed by: Warner Bros.
- Release date: March 30, 1994 (United States)
- Running time: 86 minutes
- Countries: United States; Ireland
- Language: English
- Budget: $28 million
- Box office: $17 million

Thumbelina (also known as Hans Christian Andersen's Thumbelina) is a 1994 independent animated musical romance fantasy film directed by Don Bluth and Gary Goldman, based on the story Thumbelina by Hans Christian Andersen. The film stars the voices of Jodi Benson and Gary Imhoff, with supporting roles from Gino Conforti, Joe Lynch (in his final film role before his death in 2001), John Hurt, Gilbert Gottfried, Kenneth Mars, Carol Channing, Barbara Cook, and Charo.

Thumbelina was produced by Don Bluth Ireland Ltd. and distributed by Warner Bros. under its Family Entertainment label. (Note: In 2002, the film's distribution rights were transferred from Warner Bros. Pictures to 20th Century Fox.) The film was released in theaters on March 30, 1994, to generally mixed reviews from film critics, and became a box-office failure, grossing $17 million against a $28 million budget.

== Plot ==
The camera fades to a windmill, then it turns to a town called Paris, where a romantic and wisecracking swallow named Jacquimo flies through the town and into a library where he tells the story of a tiny girl who was smaller than a thumb.

A lonely widow longing for a child of her own is given a barley seed by a friendly witch. The planted seed grows into a flower, and a tiny girl emerges from inside, no bigger than the old woman's thumb. The old woman names the tiny girl Thumbelina and raises her as her own. Although Thumbelina loves her mother, she craves the companionship of someone her own size. One night, the fairy prince Cornelius stumbles upon Thumbelina after hearing her singing. He is the first person whom she has ever met who is roughly her own size. The two take a ride on Cornelius' bumblebee and fall in love. That night, Mrs. Toad, who was enchanted by the singing during the ride, kidnaps Thumbelina, desiring her to join the troupe and marry her son Grundel. Thumbelina is rescued by Jacquimo. Meanwhile, Cornelius learns of her being kidnapped, and returns to his kingdom, the Vale of the Fairies, to ask his parents to try holding back the winter as long as they can, but they can only hold it for a day.

Grundel learns that Thumbelina has escaped and ventures out to find her. While heading home with the help of Jacquimo's bug friends, Thumbelina meets Berkeley Beetle, a sleazy nightclub singer who promises to show her the way home if she sings at his Beetle Ball. She reluctantly complies, but her bug disguise falls off during the concert, and the insect audience denounces her as ugly. Beetle abandons Thumbelina without helping her. However, she is again found by Jacquimo, who promises to find Cornelius for her. Beetle is confronted by Grundel and suggests that Grundel kidnap Cornelius and use him to lure Thumbelina. Inspired by that idea, Grundel coerces Beetle into capturing the prince for him while he sets up the trap for Thumbelina.

Winter arrives. Jacquimo injures his wing and loses consciousness in the cold, while Cornelius is blown into a pond where he freezes. Beetle finds the frozen Cornelius and takes him to Grundel. Meanwhile, Thumbelina has been taken in by a greedy mouse named Miss Fieldmouse. After relaying Cornelius' fate to her, Miss Fieldmouse introduces Thumbelina to her wealthy neighbor Mr. Mole, who also becomes infatuated with Thumbelina and has Miss Fieldmouse persuade Thumbelina to marry him. Thumbelina is devastated by the apparent loss of Cornelius, gives in to hopelessness, and accepts Mr. Mole's proposal. As Thumbelina reluctantly makes up her mind to wed, Jacquimo revives and rushes off to find Cornelius before the wedding, unaware that the prince is supposedly dead.

Meanwhile, Beetle learns of Thumbelina's wedding and warns Grundel, who rushes off after her. When Grundel leaves Cornelius behind in his haste to reach Thumbelina, the trio of insect children who helped Thumbelina earlier find and thaw Cornelius out. At the wedding, Thumbelina finds herself unable to marry Mr. Mole after remembering Cornelius' promise to always love her. Grundel crashes the wedding, and Thumbelina flees. Cornelius arrives and engages Grundel in a fight, which culminates with the two falling into a hole as Thumbelina escapes by climbing a pile of Mr. Mole's treasure to the surface.

Jacquimo finds the Vale of the Fairies and takes Thumbelina there. As Thumbelina sings to thaw winter and usher in spring, she and Cornelius reunite. As they embrace, Thumbelina magically grows her own pair of wings. With Jacquimo, the three insect children, Thumbelina's mother, and the fairy court in attendance, the two marry and depart on Cornelius's bumblebee. Meanwhile, Beetle resumes his pop career after his wings regrow, Grundel survives the fall with a broken leg and falls in love with a female toad to his mother's delight, and Mr. Mole marries Miss Fieldmouse.

== Voice cast ==
- Jodi Benson as Thumbelina, a tiny young girl who is not as big as her mother's thumb and falls in love with the handsome fairy prince Cornelius.
- Gary Imhoff as Prince Cornelius, the Prince of the Fairies and Thumbelina's love interest.
- Gino Conforti as Jacquimo, a wise swallow who speaks with a French accent. He is the partial narrator of the story.
- Barbara Cook as Thumbelina's Mother, the kind widow who mothers Thumbelina since her birth from a flower.
- Kenneth Mars as King Colbert, Cornelius' father.
- June Foray as Queen Tabitha, Cornelius' mother.
- Joe Lynch as Grundel Toad, a lustful toad in love with Thumbelina.
- Tawny Sunshine Glover as Gnatty, one of the jitterbugs.
- Michael Nunes as Li'l Bee, one of the jitterbugs.
- Kendall Cunningham as Baby Bug, one of the jitterbugs.
- Gilbert Gottfried as Berkeley Beetle, a beetle singer who owns his own "beetle band" and a so-called "connoisseur of sweet nectars, a designer of rare threads, and a judge of beautiful Thumbelina". He is forced by Grundel to help him to find Thumbelina.
- Carol Channing as Ms. Fieldmouse, a seemingly kind but rather greedy field mouse who takes Thumbelina in from the cold and persuades her to marry Mr. Mole.
- John Hurt as Mr. Mole, a fabulously wealthy but self-involved and cynical mole who falls in love with Thumbelina after hearing her voice.
- Charo as Mrs. Toad, a glamorous and famous Spanish singer and mother to her three sons Mozo, Gringo, and Grundel.
- Danny Mann as Mozo, Grundel's younger brother.
- Loren Lester as Gringo, Grundel's younger brother.
- Will Ryan as Hero Dog and Reverend Rat. Additionally, Ryan, along with Louise Vallance, voiced multiple background characters, including several beetles, barnyard animals, and other various insects.
- Pat Musick as Mrs. Rabbit
- Neil Ross as Mr. Bear, Mr. Fox
- Tony Jay (uncredited) as a bull on the farm of Thumbelina's mother.

== Production ==
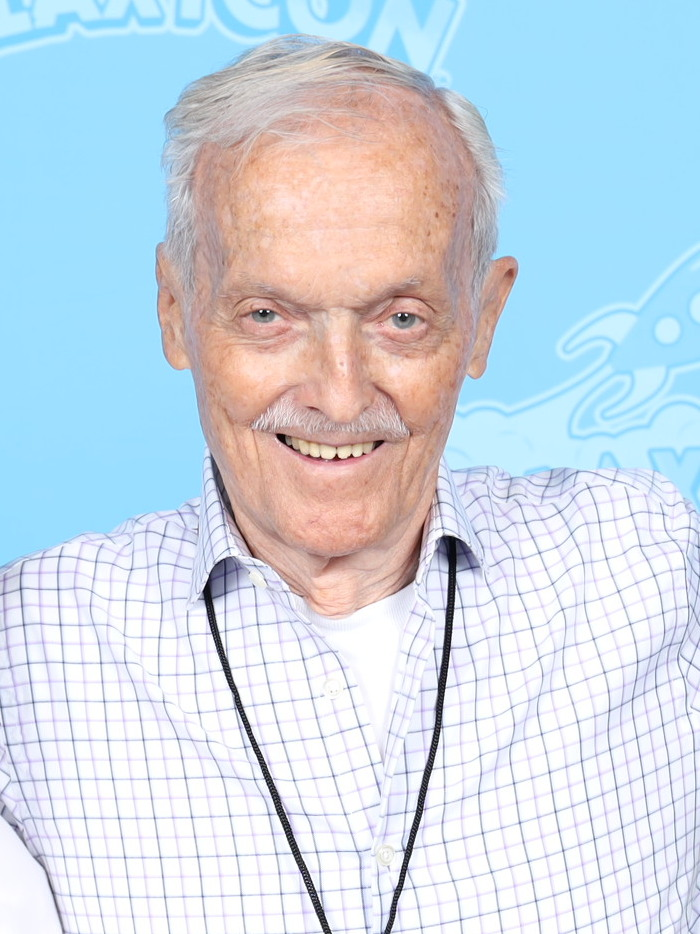
Don Bluth (pictured here in 2023) hoped the message of Thumbelina would tell young girls they "can solve their problems themselves".

Having watched the 1952 film Hans Christian Andersen, Don Bluth decided to adapt the fairy tale Thumbelina into an animated feature film. Bluth stated, "I wanted every little girl in the world to love Thumbelina, and I was determined to get an early start on the script." To write the screenplay, Bluth hired American writer Carol Lynn Pearson, who also admired the fairy tale. She arrived at the Sullivan Bluth Studios in Dublin with her family to meet with Bluth. After she had submitted a story treatment, the two held several story meetings, in which Bluth gave Pearson nine months to complete the screenplay. By the eighth month, Pearson turned in her final script draft. Bluth read the draft later that night, and held a follow-up meeting with Pearson the next morning. He said, "There are some great moments ... But there's also some stuff missing." He explained that Cornelius, the fairy prince, was a "wimp" and that Thumbelina is too pitiful on herself.

Pearson was told to improve Thumbelina and Cornelius's love story, and have Thumbelina act more optimistically. She flew back to the United States to be with her children, who were starting school. A month later, Bluth and Pearson met again in Century City, Los Angeles to discuss her script revisions. However, she held firm to her vision for the story. Bluth then decided to rewrite the script himself. In February 1991, Thumbelina went into production at Sullivan Bluth Studios Ireland Ltd. (formerly known as Sullivan Bluth Studios at that time) in Dublin. During the film's production, Sullivan Bluth faced financial difficulties when the UK-based Goldcrest Films threatened to liquidate the studio when they had failed to repay a loan statement of $300,000. The Irish High Court gave Sullivan Bluth time to prove they could make the necessary payments. However, in April 1991, Goldcrest repealed its lawsuit.

After the release of Rock-a-Doodle (1991), and its disappointing box office performance, the studio (which was renamed Don Bluth Entertainment) filed for bankruptcy protection in October 1992. Due to Bluth Entertainment's liquidation proceedings, the production staff had been laid off. A month later, John Boorman's production company Merlin Films, along with the Hong Kong-based Media Assets, made bids to spend $14 million to acquire the studio. By this time, Bluth had three films in development: Thumbelina, A Troll in Central Park (1994), and The Pebble and the Penguin (1995). The acquisition was approved by the Irish High Court, with Merlin Films and Media Assets spending $6 million to immediately complete the first two films, though financiers wanted Thumbelina released first. With Boorman as the company's new chairman, the production staff of 500 people, who had lost their jobs, were rehired to finish the film.

=== Casting ===
Jodi Benson, best known for voicing Ariel in Disney Animation's The Little Mermaid (1989), was cast as the title character, and began recording her role in early 1992. Gilbert Gottfried was cast as Berkeley Beetle. Gottfried was hired for the role before he had been cast as Iago in Disney Animation's Aladdin (1992). John Hurt, who lived in Ireland at the time, was cast as Mr. Mole. He recorded his part at the Windmill Lane Studios.

Betty White was initially hired to voice the character Mrs. Fieldmouse, and recorded her part in Los Angeles. Bluth however decided her voice "lacked energy" and flew back to Dublin. Without informing White, Bluth hired Carol Channing for the role. Channing and White had been lifelong friends, so Channing called her stating: "I just recorded the voice of a field mouse for an animated movie. It was so fun." White replied she did the same, and Bluth was soon met with an angry phone call from White's agents. Regretting how he handled the situation, Bluth wrote an apology letter to White.

== Release ==
Thumbelina was originally slated for a Thanksgiving 1993 release, with Metro-Goldwyn-Mayer (MGM) as the distributor in North America, and J&M Entertainment as the distributor internationally. However, by the time it was completed, both companies dropped the arrangement due to concerns about the bankruptcy of Bluth's studio. During Sullivan Bluth's bankruptcy proceedings, the court trustee presented the film to Disney's film distribution unit, Buena Vista Pictures Distribution. The trustee ultimately declined Disney's offer to distribute the film as they were also trying to find a new owner for the studio.

In March 1993, Warner Bros. acquired the film's distribution rights. During test screenings, the film reportedly received higher scores when Warner Bros. replaced its logo with that of Walt Disney Pictures.

The film was released in theaters in the U.S. on March 30, 1994, accompanied by the Animaniacs short I'm Mad.

=== Home media ===
On July 26, 1994, Warner Home Video released Thumbelina on VHS and LaserDisc in the United States and Canada and internationally throughout the 1990s. The film was re-released on VHS in the United Kingdom on March 20, 1995. Warner Home Video released the film on DVD on September 21, 1999. Thumbelina was re-released on VHS and DVD by 20th Century Fox Home Entertainment on February 19, 2002, alongside Anastasia and FernGully: The Last Rainforest as part of the Fox Family Features lineup and on Blu-ray on March 6, 2012.

The film was available to view on Disney+ when it launched on November 12, 2019, following Disney's acquisition of 21st Century Fox earlier that year. It has been intermittently available on the service since then.

== Music ==
Barry Manilow agreed to compose the songs for three Don Bluth pictures. Thumbelina is the first, followed by The Pebble and the Penguin, and the third, a retelling of the story of Rapunzel, in which Manilow also had a voice role, was canceled. The soundtrack was released for a limited time and has since gone out of print. "Marry the Mole" won the Razzie Award for Worst Original Song.

== Reception ==
=== Box office ===
During its opening weekend, the film opened at eighth place at the box office, earning $2.3 million. During its second weekend, its weekend box office grosses fell by less than 4 percent, and earned $2.2 million. It ultimately earned $11.4 million within the United States and Canada. In 24 markets internationally, it grossed $5.2 million for a worldwide total of at least $16.6 million against a budget of $28 million.

=== Critical reception ===
On the review aggregator website Rotten Tomatoes, 40% of 15 critics' reviews were positive, with an average rating of 5.3/10.

Kevin Thomas of the Los Angeles Times called Thumbelina "another success from Bluth and his partner Gary Goldman [which] is a work of lilting pace and charm with an array of enjoyable rather than memorable songs, with lyrics by Jack Feldman and Bruce Sussman and music by Barry Manilow". James Berardinelli of ReelViews gave the film three stars out of four, and wrote: "Thumbelina is close to, but not quite at, the level of The Little Mermaid, the weakest of Disney's recent entries". Dave Kehr of the Chicago Tribune also gave the film three stars out of four, writing: Thumbelina "rivals some of Disney's best work". He felt the film's best moments were "its star-studded comedic cast and a memorable score by Barry Manilow. Most notable is the voice of Thumbelina, melodically performed by Jodi Benson, the voice of Ariel in The Little Mermaid."

Roger Ebert of the Chicago Sun-Times gave the film two stars out of four, concluding his review: "It is difficult to imagine anyone over the age of 12 finding much to enjoy in Thumbelina". Stephen Holden of The New York Times favorably compared Manilow's music to Alan Menken's in The Little Mermaid and Beauty and the Beast (1991), but said the lyrics "lack the chiseled-in-stone wit of Howard Ashman's brilliant lyrics for those films". Rita Kempley of The Washington Post criticized Bluth's deviations from the original fairy tale, writing: "By turning the story upside down, Bluth has stripped away its natural tension. The Lilliputian heroine never really grows or changes; she just wanders about the forest fighting off horny toads, marriage-minded moles and other quirky little critters. There's plenty of talent here -- Carol Channing, Barbara Cook, Gilbert Gottfried and John Hurt -- but it's wasted on this fallow ground."

It won a Golden Raspberry Award for Worst Original Song for the song "Marry the Mole", sung by Carol Channing.

== See also ==
- List of Warner Bros. theatrical animated feature films
- List of American films of 1994
