= John Pomeroy =

American animator

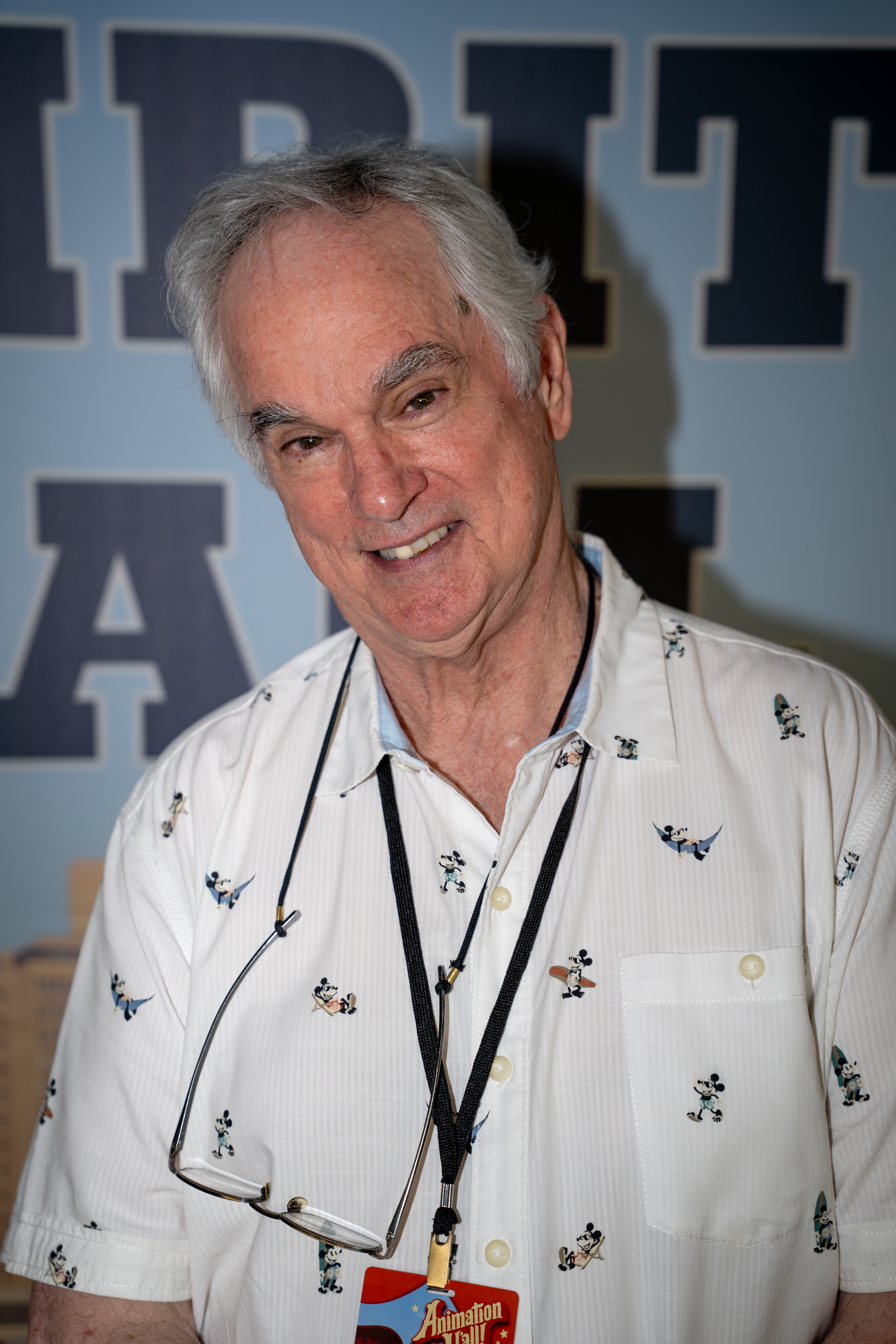
- Pomeroy in 2026
- Born: John Foster Pomeroy; Los Angeles, California, U.S.
- Occupations: Animator, film producer, writer, painter
- Years active: 1970–present
- Known for: Various work with Disney and Don Bluth

John Foster Pomeroy is an American animator who has worked for several major studios, including Walt Disney Animation Studios and Sullivan Bluth Studios. He has also worked as producer, and screenwriter on several animated feature films.

== Career ==
John Pomeroy started work at Walt Disney Animation Studios in 1973 as a background artist, and became a full animator in 1974 to work on Winnie the Pooh and Tigger Too. While working at Disney, he met fellow animators Don Bluth and Gary Goldman, and began working with them on an independent short film project, Banjo the Woodpile Cat.

In 1979 he, Bluth, Goldman and several other Disney animators left the studio to form the independent studio Don Bluth Productions (later to become Bluth Group), which produced the film The Secret of NIMH and the animation for laserdisc video games Dragon's Lair and Space Ace. The independent studio encountered financial difficulties and declared bankruptcy in 1984, but reformed soon after as Sullivan Bluth Studios and opened a major animation facility in Dublin, Ireland.

Pomeroy remained at the Dublin studio to work as the directing animator and producer on An American Tail and The Land Before Time, before moving back to America in 1989 to form a new US wing of the company.

Learn to Draw Anatomy. Video by John Pomeroy.

After working with Sullivan Bluth for thirteen years, Pomeroy was convinced to return to Disney by Don Hahn to work as the supervising animator on John Smith for Pocahontas. While working at Disney, Pomeroy also provided animation for the films Fantasia 2000, The Tigger Movie, Atlantis: The Lost Empire and Treasure Planet.

Pomeroy then left Disney once again in 2003 during the period where they briefly shut down their traditional animation department and subsequently started to do freelance work and was an animator for Curious George and The Simpsons Movie, as well as Tom and Jerry and the Wizard of Oz, Tom and Jerry: The Lost Dragon, Tom and Jerry: Spy Quest, Tom and Jerry: Back to Oz, Tom and Jerry: Willy Wonka and the Chocolate Factory, Space Jam: A New Legacy and Disenchanted.

Pomeroy is also a sculptor, and creates busts that animated film artists use to visualize a 3-D model of their character.

John Pomeroy is also a painter of historic events, and builder of historic weapons used in movies.

He is currently on the elders board at a Village Christian School in Sun Valley, California.

== Filmography ==
Year	Title	Credits	Characters	Notes
1974	Winnie the Pooh and Tigger Too (Short)	Animator		
1977	The Many Adventures of Winnie the Pooh	Animator		
1977	The Rescuers	Character Animator		
1977	Pete's Dragon	Character Animator		
1978	The Small One (Short)	Directing Animator		
1979	Banjo the Woodpile Cat (TV Short)	Animator / Producer		
1982	The Secret of NIMH	Producer / Directing Animator / Story Adaptation		
1982	The Magical World of Disney (TV Series)	Animator - 1 Episode		
1983	Dragon's Lair (Video Game)	Producer / Animator		
1984	Space Ace (Video Game)	Producer		
1986	An American Tail	Producer / Directing Animator		
1988	The Land Before Time	Producer / Directing Animator		
1989	All Dogs Go to Heaven	Producer / Story / Directing Animator		
1990	Dragon's Lair II: Time Warp (Video Game)	Producer / Animator		
1990	Rock-a-Doodle	Producer / Story / Directing Animator		
1994	Thumbelina	Producer / Supervising Directing Animator: Los Angeles		
1994	A Troll in Central Park	Producer / Story / Supervising Directing Animator		
1995	The Pebble and the Penguin	Producer / Directing Animator		
1995	Pocahontas	Supervising Animator	John Smith	
2000	Fantasia 2000	Lead Character Animator - Segment "Firebird Suite - 1919 Version"	Firebird	
2000	The Tigger Movie	Additional Animator		
2001	Atlantis: The Lost Empire	Supervising Animator	Milo James Thatch	
2002	Dragon's Lair 3D: Return to the Lair (Video Game)	Animator: Intro and Ending		
2002	Treasure Planet	Supervising Animator	Captain Nathaniel Flint & His Crew	
2006	Curious George	Storyboard Artist / Lead Animator	Maggie and Clovis	
2007	The Simpsons Movie	Animator		
2009	Wild About Safety: Timon and Pumbaa Safety Smart: Goes Green! (Video short)	Animator		
2009	Wild About Safety: Timon and Pumbaa Safety Smart: In the Water! (Video short)	Animator		
2009	Tinker Bell and the Lost Treasure (Video)	Story Artist		
2010	Tinker Bell and the Great Fairy Rescue (Video)	Additional Story Artist		
2011	Tom and Jerry and the Wizard of Oz (Video)	Character Layout And Animation		
2013	Planes	Story Artist		
2014	Tom and Jerry: The Lost Dragon (Video)	Storyboard Artist / Character Layout and Animation		
2015	Alpha and Omega: Family Vacation	Story Artist		
2015	Tom and Jerry: Spy Quest (Video)	Character Layout and Animation		
2016	Tom and Jerry: Back to Oz (Video)	Storyboard Artist / Character Layout And Animation		
2016	Elena of Avalor (TV Series)	Character Designer - 1 Episode / Storyboard Artist - 2 Episodes		
2016	The Swan Princess: Princess Tomorrow, Pirate Today (Video)	Storyboard Artist		
2017	Bunyan and Babe	Storyboard Artist		
2017	The Swan Princess: Royally Undercover (Video)	Storyboard Artist		
2017	Tom and Jerry: Willy Wonka and the Chocolate Factory (Video)	Character Layout And Animation		
2017	Animal Crackers	Storyboard Artist		
2016–2017	Sofia the First (TV Series)	Character Designer - 2 Episodes		
2018	The Swan Princess: A Royal Myztery (Video)	Storyboard Artist		
2018	Sofia the First (TV Series)	Storyboard Artist - 1 Episode		
2019	Klaus	Additional Animator		
2021	Space Jam: A New Legacy	Animator: Tonic DNA		
2021–2023	Looney Tunes Cartoons	Character Designer		
2022	Green Eggs and Ham: The Second Serving	Animator		
2022	Disenchanted	Animator: Tonic DNA		
2026	Drawing Prada: Animated by Hand	Animation Director		
