= A Troll in Central Park =

1994 film by Don Bluth and Gary Goldman

- Theatrical release poster by John Alvin
- Directed by: Don Bluth; Gary Goldman
- Screenplay by: Stu Krieger
- Story by: Don Bluth; Gary Goldman; John Pomeroy; T. J. Kuenster; Stu Krieger
- Produced by: Don Bluth; Gary Goldman; John Pomeroy
- Starring: Dom DeLuise; Cloris Leachman; Charles Nelson Reilly; Phillip Glasser; Tawny Sunshine Glover; Hayley Mills; Jonathan Pryce
- Edited by: Fiona Trayler
- Music by: Robert Folk
- Production company: Don Bluth Ireland Limited
- Distributed by: Warner Bros.
- Release date: October 7, 1994
- Running time: 76 minutes
- Countries: United States; Ireland
- Language: English
- Box office: $71,368

A Troll in Central Park (released in some countries as Stanley's Magic Garden) is a 1994 independent animated musical fantasy comedy film co-directed by Don Bluth and Gary Goldman. The film stars the voice talents of Dom DeLuise, Cloris Leachman, Charles Nelson Reilly, Phillip Glasser, Tawny Sunshine Glover, Hayley Mills and Jonathan Pryce. It tells the story of a troll who is exiled from the Kingdom of Trolls by an evil troll queen for growing flowers and lands in Central Park where he befriends two children. This is the final Bluth film to star DeLuise.

Theatrically released in the United States on October 7, 1994, by Warner Bros. under their Family Entertainment label, the film was panned by critics who criticized its pacing, characters, corniness, visuals, and songs although its animation and voice acting (aside from Dom DeLuise) were praised. The film was also a box-office bomb, grossing just $71,368 at the North American box office.

== Plot ==
Stanley is a cheerful troll with the ability to grow sentient flowers with his magical green thumb. He lives in the Kingdom of Trolls, ruled by the evil Queen Gnorga, who despises flowers and has the ability to turn anything to stone with her purple thumb. As such, Stanley is forced to keep his ability secret from the rest of the trolls in the Kingdom.

One day, Stanley's collection of flowers is accidentally exposed to the other trolls, who take him to Gnorga as punishment. Gnorga insists that Stanley be turned to stone. Gnorga's husband King Llort, who is often attacked by Gnorga's pet troll dog, convinces her to banish Stanley to New York City instead. Feeling frightened by his surroundings in New York, Stanley sadly resigns himself to living in a cave under a bridge in Central Park.

Elsewhere, a young boy named Gus and his baby sister, Rosie, feel neglected by their busy parents and decide to sneak away to Central Park. While playing with their toy boat, Gus and Rosie meet Stanley, who shows off his magical talent. Distrustful of Stanley, Gus tries to force Rosie to come home with him, leading to a fight between Gus and Stanley that causes Rosie to cry.

Meanwhile, in the Kingdom of Trolls, Gnorga watches Stanley interacting with Rosie and Gus and becomes enraged that Stanley is happy in his exile. Noticing Gus' frustration towards Stanley, Gnorga decides to take advantage of this by casting a spell on Gus that makes him cry uncontrollably and causes his tears to flood Stanley's cave. Using his green thumb, Stanley enlarges Gus and Rosie's toy boat which the three board to escape.

Having learned of Stanley's survival, Gnorga and Llort transport themselves to Central Park via a tornado, leaving the park devastated as a result of the impact. When Gus and Rosie decide to return home, they are suddenly attacked by Gnorga, who successfully kidnaps Rosie. Gus returns to Stanley's cave and asks for his help, but a frightened Stanley refuses. Angered, Gus berates Stanley for his cowardice and leaves to confront Gnorga, with Stanley's flower friends following.

At an abandoned building where Rosie is being held captive, Gus and the flowers free Rosie and battle Gnorga and Llort. Gnorga transforms Gus into a troll who shares Gnorga's stone powers. During the battle, Rosie falls off the building but is saved by Stanley, who used his powers to give Gus and Rosie's boat the ability to fly. Stanley then engages Gnorga in a thumb-wrestling match and causes her to slowly turn into a flower bush before he flees with Gus, Rosie, and the flowers. Before fully succumbing to her curse, Gnorga manipulates Gus into turning Stanley to stone.

After Stanley gets turned to stone, Gus and Rosie return home with Gus regaining his human form. The next morning, Gus, Rosie, and their parents visit Central Park, where Gus and Rosie place the petrified Stanley on a makeshift pedestal. Using Stanley's green thumb trick, Gus manages to revive Stanley, who uses his magic to restore Central Park and cover New York City in flowers.

Back in the Kingdom of Trolls, the Wursta Times newspaper states that Gnorga is now the Queen of Posies who has been potted in a posie garden, the case against Stanley has been dropped, and Llort is now the sole ruler of the Kingdom of Trolls. He is amused with the news as he is attacked by Gnorga's pet troll dog again as the end credits roll.

== Cast ==
- Dom DeLuise as Stanley, a troll with a magical green thumb that can grow plants.
- Cloris Leachman as Gnorga, an evil Queen who rules the Kingdom of Trolls.
- Charles Nelson Reilly as Llort, Gnorga's husband who is the king consort of the Kingdom of Trolls and is constantly attacked by his wife's pet troll dog.
- Phillip Glasser as Gus, a bratty 7-year-old boy.
- Tawny Sunshine Glover as Rosie, a 2-year-old girl and Gus's younger sister.
- Jonathan Pryce as Alan, the father of Gus and Rosie.
- Hayley Mills as Hillary, the mother of Gus and Rosie.
- Neil Ross as Generic Pansy, a talking pansy.
- Will Ryan as:
  - Plant Boss, a talking plant that is in charge of the other talking plants.
  - A troll guard (uncredited)
- Pat Musick as Snuffy, a talking flower.

== Production ==
Production on the film began in 1990, following the near completion of Rock-a-Doodle. Buddy Hackett and Robert Morley were originally considered for the roles of Stanley and King Llort respectively but were eventually replaced by Dom DeLuise and Charles Nelson Reilly. Even though the film was completed in 1992, it was not released in theaters until 1994. At that time, the film was originally slated for a March 1994 release, but due to production difficulties and Merlin Films and Media Assets, co-financers of the film, deciding to release Thumbelina first, and the film's release date was changed to October 7, 1994.

== Soundtrack ==
A Troll in Central Park

Soundtrack album by various artists
- Released: February 14, 2012
- Genre: Soundtrack
- Length: 64:27
- Label: Intrada Records
- Producer: Robert Folk

Don Bluth Music of Films chronology
Thumbelina (1994)	A Troll in Central Park (1994)	The Pebble and the Penguin (1995)

The music for A Troll in Central Park was composed and conducted by Robert Folk, who previously provided the soundtrack for Rock-a-Doodle (1991), and was performed by the Irish Film Orchestra. Although a commercial soundtrack was not released alongside the film in 1994, a limited edition CD containing 15 tracks from the film was made available on February 12, 2012, by Intrada Records as part of their Intrada Special Collection. The tracks were taken from the original digital session masters, with three songs written by Barry Mann, Cynthia Weil, Norman Gimbel and Robert Folk ultimately omitted due to being permanently wedded to sound effects and dialogue from the film.

== Reception ==
=== Box office ===
The film grossed $71,368 in North America. It was Don Bluth's lowest-grossing film to date, though not the film to lose him the most money overall. Gary Goldman said the reason for this was that the film was released without any promotion and its release was limited. He also said that distributor Warner Bros. Pictures did not have any confidence in the film.

=== Critical reception ===
A Troll in Central Park holds an approval rating of 14% with an average of 3.48 out of 10 based on seven reviews from Rotten Tomatoes. TV Guide gave the film two out of five stars and felt that the film's appeal was very age-limited, calling it "pastel-pretty and cloyingly sweet" and that "A Troll in Central Park is strictly for the youngest members of the moviegoing audience". The A.V. Club wrote that A Troll in Central Park is "widely considered to be Don Bluth's worst film".

Bluth has distanced himself from the film, stating in the July 2001 issue of his magazine ToonTalk that "the development of a story is like the development of a child in a womb; it takes time and it must be done right, and building A Troll in Central Park taught us this lesson, the hard way".

== Home media ==
On January 10, 1995, Warner Home Video released A Troll in Central Park on VHS and LaserDisc in the United States and Canada. In the United Kingdom, the film was released on VHS under the title Stanley's Magic Garden. 20th Century Fox Home Entertainment (Note: In 2002, Warner Bros. sold the copyright of the film to 20th Century Fox Home Entertainment.) released the film on DVD for the first time on February 19, 2002.

== See also ==
- List of Warner Bros. theatrical animated features
- List of American films of 1994
