= Gary Goldman =

American film director and producer (born 1944)

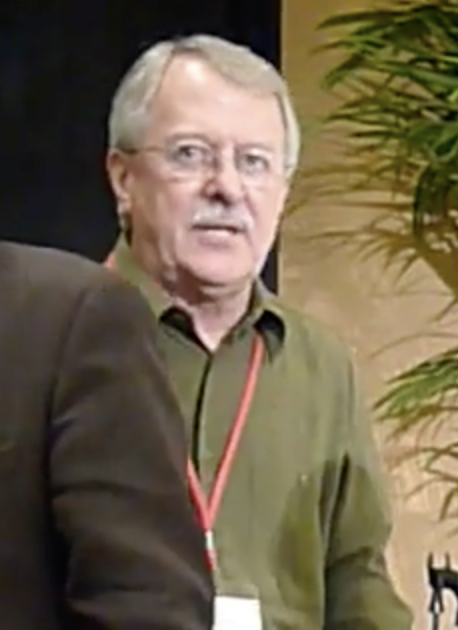
- Goldman in 2009
- Born: Gary Wayne Goldman; November 17, 1944 (age 81); Oakland, California, U.S.
- Occupations: Film producer; director; animator; writer; voice actor
- Years active: 1973–present
- Employer(s): Walt Disney Productions (1972–1979); Don Bluth Entertainment (1979–1995); 20th Century Fox (1994–2000); Don Bluth Studios (2020–present)
- Known for: Various animation work with Don Bluth
- Spouses: Janith Eileen Brand (m. 1968; div. 1987); Cathy Carr (m. 1988)
- Children: 2

Gary Wayne Goldman (born November 17, 1944) is an American film producer, director, animator, writer and voice actor. He is best known for his collaboration with animation filmmaker Don Bluth and producing the animated films The Secret of NIMH, An American Tail, The Land Before Time, All Dogs Go to Heaven, Anastasia, and Titan A.E., the latter two he co-directed with Bluth. He worked as an animator at Disney before working at Don Bluth Productions with Bluth.

== Early life ==
Goldman was born in Oakland, California and raised in Watsonville, California. As a youth, Goldman was active in sports, an infielder in baseball and quarterback in high school football, he studied piano and enjoyed model-making and drawing. Before devoting himself entirely to the arts, he served as an electronics technician in the United States Air Force from 1962 to 1967, assigned duties in Japan and Germany. He received his Associate of Arts Degree in 1969 from Cabrillo College, and he graduated in December 1971 with a Bachelor of Fine Arts degree in Life Drawing and Art History from the University of Hawaii.

== Career ==
=== Disney ===
Goldman began his career in animation when he joined Walt Disney Productions in February 1972. His first assignment was as an in-betweener to legendary Disney animator Frank Thomas on the film Robin Hood. He then worked alongside Don Bluth, as an animator, on Winnie the Pooh and Tigger Too! and The Rescuers before serving as directing animator on Pete's Dragon and The Small One.

In an effort to accelerate their skills in preparation for leadership assignments within the Disney organization, Goldman and Bluth began to purchase used animation equipment and probe every aspect of animated production, at Don Bluth's home. United by the common goal of restoring the lost techniques of classical animation, Goldman and Bluth, along with animator John Pomeroy, produced, directed and animated the classically animated 27-minute, filmed-featurette Banjo the Woodpile Cat. Their enthusiasm attracted many other artists at Disney, who came by the garage to contribute their time and artistry to the project. It took four years, working nights and weekends in Bluth's garage. In December 1979, the film was shown at the Egyptian theater in Hollywood and the Peppertree theater in Northridge. It received the National Film Advisory Board Award for Excellence, and the Golden Scroll Award from the Academy of Science Fiction, Fantasy and Horror Films. Using what they learned on their project, they attempted to implement their techniques on projects at Disney. Banjo the Woodpile Cat was later shown on ABC Television (June 1982), as a prime time special.

=== Post-Disney ===
Divided by disagreements over story and production values, Goldman, along with Bluth and Pomeroy, resigned from Walt Disney Productions to establish their independent animation studio, Don Bluth Productions, in 1979. The departure was highly publicized and the trio was dubbed "Disney Defectors" by news reporters.

Since leaving Disney, the team produced several feature films, starting with The Secret of NIMH, which won the Saturn Award for "Best Animated Feature" from the Science Fiction, Fantasy and Horror Film Academy. In late 1982, composer Jerry Goldsmith introduced them to director Steven Spielberg. Their first collaboration with Spielberg, which began production in January 1985, An American Tail, was released in November 1986 and ushered in a new era of success for the full-length animated feature, becoming the highest-grossing animated film up to that time.

Goldman was a producer on the highly successful animated laser disc interactive video games Dragon's Lair, Space Ace and Dragon's Lair II: Time Warp. Dragon's Lair received the Inkpot Award for the "First Interactive Laser Disc Arcade Game" and an Arkie Award for the "Best Arcade Audio/Visuals". Financial difficulties with their distributor cut them off from financing and forced them to seek protection from bankruptcy in 1984. It was at this time that they met mergers and acquisitions expert, Morris Sullivan, who set up a corporation, Sullivan Studios to allow the trio to continue while the bankruptcy courts slowly settled their company's case against its distributor.

In 1986, Sullivan moved Goldman, Bluth & Pomeroy, and the entire operation, including 87 employees and their families to Dublin, Ireland, at the invitation of IDA Ireland. Their third feature film, The Land Before Time, was their first production created primarily in Ireland. Sullivan transferred much of the ownership of the Dublin studio to the three animators and renamed the company Sullivan Bluth Studios. The company produced six feature films from 1986 until 1994. Sullivan retired in 1991 and the company was renamed Don Bluth Entertainment, Ireland, Ltd.

In August 1994, Goldman and Bluth returned from Ireland to head up the Fox Animation Studio located in Phoenix, Arizona where they shared creative leadership as producers and directors. The first production completed by the studio was the award-winning Anastasia in 1997. Also produced there was Bartok the Magnificent in 1999, and the animated science fiction post-apocalyptic film Titan A.E. in 2000. A fourth feature film, Africa, was in production when 20th Century Fox shut down its Phoenix animation facility.

Goldman and Bluth have reestablished their independence with their production company Don Bluth Films, Inc., developing feature-length properties. The company established a website where they communicate with their audience on a personal level and provide animation information online.

In August 2007, Goldman was named an artist in residence at the Savannah College of Art and Design for the college's 10-week winter quarter starting in January 2008. Goldman lectured on animation, as well as taught undergraduate and graduate level classes in traditional 2-D animation production.

=== Miscellaneous ===
Goldman has been a member of the Academy of Motion Picture Arts and Sciences since 1978.

== Personal life ==
While in college he married elementary teacher Janith Eileen Brand in April 1968. They separated in 1983 and divorced in 1987. They have two children, Kip and Andrew. In 2000 Goldman & Bluth received Lifetime Achievement Awards for their dedication and contribution to the art of animation from Animation Magazine, and in 2005, at the Savannah Film Festival, Lifetime Achievement Awards for animation, from the Savannah College of Art & Design, to which they gave their animation art archive. Goldman remarried in late 1988 to film cutter Cathy (Bassett) Carr. She and her three children John Carr, Jason Carr and Joanna Carr moved with him to Dublin, Ireland in 1986. Together they have nine grandchildren.

== Illness ==
On April 8, 2026, Goldman's family revealed that Gary has been suffering from dementia since last year. His family also made a GoFundMe page to financially help his wife so that she can take care of him.

== Filmography ==
Title	Year	Functioned as				Notes
Title	Year	Director	Producer	Writer	Animation department	Notes
The Mini-Munsters (direct-to-TV)	1973	No	No	No	Yes	animator
Robin Hood	1973	No	No	No Uncredited	Yes	assistant animator
Winnie the Pooh and Tigger Too (short)	1974	No	No	Yes	Yes	story - uncredited / animator
The Many Adventures of Winnie the Pooh	1977	No	No	No	Yes	animator
The Rescuers	1977	No	No	No	Yes	character animator
Pete's Dragon	1977	No	No	No	Yes	character animator
The Small One (short)	1978	No	No	No	Yes	directing animator
Banjo the Woodpile Cat (direct-to-TV short)	1979	No	Yes	No	Yes	animator
Xanadu	1980	No	No	No	Yes	camera planning: animation sequence unit
The Fox and the Hound	1981	No	No	No	Yes	animator Uncredited
The Secret of NIMH	1982	No	Yes	Yes	Yes	story adaptation / directing animator
An American Tail	1986	No	Yes	No	No	
The Land Before Time	1988	No	Yes	No	No	
All Dogs Go to Heaven	1989	Yes	Yes	Yes	No	co-director / story
Rock-a-Doodle	1991	Yes	Yes	Yes	No	co-director / story
Thumbelina	1994	Yes	Yes	No	No	director
A Troll in Central Park	1994	Yes	Yes	Yes	No	director / story
The Pebble and the Penguin	1995	Yes	Yes	No	No	co-director (uncredited)
Anastasia	1997	Yes	Yes	No	No	director
Bartok the Magnificent (direct-to-DVD)	1999	Yes	Yes	No	No	director
Titan A.E.	2000	Yes	Yes	No	No	director
Gift of the Hoopoe (short)	2009	Yes	No	No	No	co-directing credit only
Dragon's Lair: The Movie		Yes	Yes			

== Video games ==
Title	Year	Functioned as		Voice role	Notes
Title	Year	Producer	Animator	Voice role	Notes
Dragon's Lair	1983	Yes	Yes		
Space Ace	1983	Yes	No		
Dragon's Lair II: Time Warp	1991	Yes	No		
Dragon's Lair 3D: Return to the Lair	2002	Yes	No	Mordroc	
I-Ninja	2003	Yes	No		producer: cinematics

== Awards and nominations ==
Year	Award	Category	Film	Result
1998	Annie Award	Outstanding Individual Achievement for Directing in an Animated Feature Production; Shared with Don Bluth	Anastasia	Nominated
1998	Annie Award	Outstanding Individual Achievement for Producing in an Animated Feature Production; Shared with Don Bluth	Anastasia	Nominated
1998	Online Film & Television Association Award	Best Animated Picture; Shared with Don Bluth	Anastasia	Won
1998	Satellite Awards	Best Motion Picture, Animated or Mixed Media; Shared with Don Bluth	Anastasia	Nominated
