= The Land Before Time (film) =

1988 animated adventure film directed by Don Bluth

- Theatrical release poster by Drew Struzan
- Directed by: Don Bluth
- Screenplay by: Stu Krieger
- Story by: Judy Freudberg; Tony Geiss
- Produced by: Don Bluth; Gary Goldman; John Pomeroy
- Starring: Judith Barsi; Burke Byrnes; Gabriel Damon; Bill Erwin; Pat Hingle; Candace Hutson; Will Ryan; Helen Shaver
- Edited by: John K. Carr; Dan Molina
- Music by: James Horner
- Production companies: Amblin Entertainment; Sullivan Bluth Studios
- Distributed by: Universal Pictures
- Release date: November 18, 1988
- Running time: 69 minutes
- Countries: Ireland; United States
- Language: English
- Budget: $12.3 million
- Box office: $84.5 million

The Land Before Time is a 1988 animated adventure drama film directed and co-produced by Don Bluth from a screenplay by Stu Krieger and a story by Judy Freudberg and Tony Geiss. Its executive producers are Steven Spielberg, George Lucas, Kathleen Kennedy, and Frank Marshall. The film stars the voices of Judith Barsi (posthumously), Burke Byrnes, Gabriel Damon, Bill Erwin, Pat Hingle, Candace Hutson, Will Ryan, and Helen Shaver. It is the first film in the Land Before Time franchise. It was produced by Amblin Entertainment and Sullivan Bluth Studios.

The plot features a young brown Apatosaurus named Littlefoot, who ends up alone after his mother dies protecting him from a villainous Tyrannosaurus rex. Littlefoot flees famine and upheaval to search for the Great Valley, an area spared from devastation, where the adult dinosaurs have moved on to. On his journey, he meets four young companions: Cera, an orange Triceratops, Ducky, a green Saurolophus, Petrie, a brown Pteranodon, and Spike, a green Stegosaurus. The film explores issues of prejudice between the different species and the hardships they endure in their journey as they are guided by the spirit of Littlefoot's mother and forced to deal with the Tyrannosaurus rex that killed her.

The Land Before Time is the only Don Bluth film of the 1980s in which Dom DeLuise did not participate (instead, he starred in Disney's Oliver & Company released that same day), and the only film in the Land Before Time series that is not a musical, as well as the only one to be released theatrically worldwide. It was also the last film that Bluth directed that was scored by James Horner, executive produced by Spielberg, and distributed by Universal Pictures.

The film was released by Universal Pictures on November 18, 1988, to generally positive reviews from critics and was a box office success, grossing $84.5 million against a $12.3 million budget. Its success, along with An American Tail and the 1988 live-action/animated film Who Framed Roger Rabbit, led Spielberg to found his animation studio, Amblimation. The first film spawned a franchise with thirteen direct-to-video sequels, a television series, video games and merchandise, none of which had Bluth, Spielberg nor Lucas' involvement (though Amblin Entertainment was involved in the television series like it was for Fievel's American Tails). It is currently Don Bluth's second highest-grossing animated film, only behind Anastasia (1997).

== Plot ==
During the Mesozoic, a famine forces groups of dinosaurs to look for an oasis known as the Great Valley. A "longneck" dinosaur hatches a single baby named Littlefoot. While traveling to the Great Valley, Littlefoot encounters and plays with Cera, a young "three-horn" dinosaur until her father sends him away, citing the belief that dinosaurs should keep to their own species. In the evening Littlefoot plays with Cera again until a large "sharptooth" dinosaur pursues them. Littlefoot's mother eventually comes to their rescue but is fatally wounded. During the struggle, an earthshake strikes and splits the land, swallowing up the sharptooth and dividing Littlefoot, Cera, and other dinosaurs from their herds; several die in the process. Before dying, Littlefoot's wounded mother gives him some words of advice about finding the Great Valley: "let your heart guide you. It whispers, so listen closely". Confused and grieving, Littlefoot meets Rooter, an old "clubtail" who is initially grumpy towards him, but proceeds to console him after he opens up about his mother. Littlefoot is then guided by his mother's voice telling him to follow the sun to the Great Valley. First, he must pass several landmarks, such as a rock formation that resembles a longneck and the "Mountains that Burn".

Later on, Littlefoot meets a young "bigmouth" dinosaur named Ducky and a young "flyer" pterosaur named Petrie who has yet to learn to fly, themselves separated from their families during the earthshake, who accompany him on his journey. Looking for her own kind herself, Cera finds the unconscious sharptooth inside a ravine and, believing him to be dead, rams him until she wakes him up. She escapes and bumps into Littlefoot, Ducky, and Petrie. While describing her encounter, she accidentally flings Ducky in the direction of a lone hatching "spiketail" egg, from which a male emerges; Ducky names the hatchling "Spike" and inducts him into the group. Seeking the Great Valley themselves, Littlefoot and the others discover a cluster of trees, which is depleted by a herd of longnecks. Searching for remaining growth, they discover a single leaf-bearing tree, and obtain food by stacking atop each other and pulling it down. Cera remains aloof, but at nightfall, she and everyone else gravitate to Littlefoot's side for warmth and companionship.

The next morning, Littlefoot and the group are attacked by the sharptooth but manage to escape through a tunnel which is too small for him to follow. They discover the landmarks mentioned by Littlefoot's mother. At the Mountains that Burn, a clash between Littlefoot's intention to follow his mother's directions and Cera's insistence on leaving the group results in a fight between them which causes the others to follow Cera, forcing Littlefoot to continue alone. When Ducky and Spike become endangered by lava, and Petrie gets stuck in a tar pit, Littlefoot returns to rescue them. Cera gets ambushed by a group of "domeheads" who live in the Mountains that Burn; the rest of the group pose as a tar monster, scaring away the domeheads and frightening Cera. After realizing who it really is, Cera angrily leaves the group and breaks down in tears, ashamed of her selfishness. Later, while crossing a pond, Petrie overhears the sharptooth nearby. The group devises a plan to lure him to the pond and drown him in the deep side using a nearby boulder. During the ensuing struggle, a draft from the sharptooth's nostrils enables Petrie to fly for the first time.

The plan nearly fails when the sharptooth begins attacking the boulder while the group attempts to push it onto him. However, Cera, having overcome her sorrow, reunites with the group and headbutts the boulder, causing the sharptooth to fall into the water, the boulder crashing into him in the process. The sharptooth momentarily takes Petrie down with him, but Petrie emerges unharmed while the sharptooth has drowned. Littlefoot, alone and about to give up on the search, sees his mother as a cloud; she guides him to the Great Valley, and Littlefoot is then joined by the others. After arrival, the five are reunited with their families: Petrie impresses his family with his newfound flight; Ducky introduces Spike to her family, who adopt him; Cera reunites with her father; and Littlefoot finds and rejoins his grandparents. The group reunites at the top of a hill and embrace each other in a hug.

== Cast ==
- Gabriel Damon as Littlefoot
- Candace Hutson as Cera
- Judith Barsi as Ducky, Spike's adoptive sister
- Will Ryan as Petrie
- Pat Hingle as Narrator
  - Hingle also voices Rooter, a "Clubtail".
- Helen Shaver as Littlefoot's mother
- Burke Byrnes as Daddy Topps, Cera's father
- Bill Erwin as Grandfather, Littlefoot's grandfather (credit only, cut from the final edit)

== Production ==
=== Development ===
During production of An American Tail, talk began of the next feature with Bluth and executive producer Steven Spielberg. Bluth and Spielberg wanted to do a film similar to Bambi, but with dinosaurs. Steven Spielberg's longtime friend George Lucas was also brought in on the project after being interested with it. The three persuaded An American Tail writers Judy Freudberg and Tony Geiss (both of whom were also prominent writers for Sesame Street) to write the screenplay for the film. Their initial draft was based on their early ideas, but when it was felt the story was too juvenile, Stu Krieger was brought on to revise their draft.

Early into story development, the film was about a group of young dinosaurs looking for a wise, older dinosaur. Later on, Bluth explained, "...we came up with another idea that none of these dinosaurs get along with each other, they all hate each other. They're taught from the time they were born not to associate with each other, that's racism". An early working title for the film was The Land Before Time Began. Bluth, Spielberg and Lucas originally wanted the film to have no dialogue, like The Rite of Spring sequence in Fantasia, but the idea was abandoned in favor of using voice actors in order to make it appealing to children.

=== Animation ===
As work on the script continued, Bluth delegated some of the animation staff to begin creating concept art. As with his previous films, Bluth handled the storyboarding, but with final revisions by Larry Leker. Production was initially delayed by several months as the studio moved to Ireland. Production would eventually begin in spring 1987, a few months after the release of An American Tail.

The production was preceded by extensive research, including visits to natural history museums in New York, Chicago, Los Angeles, and the Smithsonian Institution, Washington, DC. Skeletons, fossils, and paleoart from the turn of the century were consulted to help create a credible landscape and animals. Further research was conducted using live-action footage of quadrupedal modern animals, including elephants and giraffes.

=== Editing ===
Late into production, The Land Before Time underwent a severe cutting and editing of footage. Spielberg and Lucas thought that some scenes in the film would appear too dark and intense for young children. At a screening in Soho Square, London in late April 1988, six months before the film was completed, Spielberg told Bluth while looking at the scenes from the film: "It's too scary. We'll have kids crying in the lobby, and a lot of angry parents. You don't want that".

19 fully animated shots from the sharptooth attack were cut from the final film. Examples can be seen in the storyboards of the chase sequence in the briar patch. POV shots of sharptooth's snapping jaws were deleted, and shots were rearranged to shorten the sequence. This results in continuity errors, depicting the Tyrannosaur with his right eye still open after it had been blinded.

Perhaps just weeks before the film's release, more than 10 additional minutes of footage was cut from the film by Spielberg "to be sure it would not disturb parents or their children", according to producer Gary Goldman, reducing the runtime from 80 to 82 minutes to just 69 minutes. Much of the cut footage also consisted of sequences of the five young dinosaurs in grave danger and distress. An extended scene involving the introduction of Spike was deleted, as was some of the "Green Food" sequence.

Petrie's apparent death scene originally went longer, and was followed by a group hug where Littlefoot says "Now we'll always be together". This line survives in the form of a Pizza Hut promotional advertisement for the film. The film's final act was also heavily altered and rearranged; originally, Littlefoot was to find the Great Valley on his own before turning back to rescue his friends, kill sharptooth, and enter the valley as a group. This ending survives in multiple book adaptations, and the music accompanying it still exists in the official soundtrack release. Some screams were re-voiced using milder exclamations.

The scenes are believed to be destroyed, but some did make it into multiple advertisements and trailers created before the release of the film, and multiple stills can be found in storybook adaptations and press kits for the movie. Much of the unused music from the film score was meant to play over the deleted scenes. Many animation cels and drawings from the deleted scenes have surfaced on the internet.

== Music ==
The music for The Land Before Time was composed by James Horner, who had previously provided the soundtrack for Bluth's An American Tail, and performed by the London Symphony Orchestra and the Choir of King's College. An official soundtrack was released on audio cassette and vinyl record on November 21, 1988, and later on CD by MCA Records. It features seven tracks from the film: The Great Migration, Sharptooth and the Earthquake, Whispering Winds, If we Hold on Together, Foraging for Food, The Rescue/ Discovery of the Great Valley, and End Credits.

The film's theme song "If We Hold on Together", written by Horner and Will Jennings, was sung by Diana Ross and released as the lead single on November 5, though not included in the soundtrack. The album was digitally released in January 2013, by Geffen Records. An expanded version of the soundtrack album was released by Intrada Records in October 2020.

== Release ==
Along with Disney's Oliver & Company, The Land Before Time opened on November 18, 1988. Attached to the film, Universal and Amblin issued Brad Bird's Family Dog short from their television anthology Amazing Stories.

== Reception ==
=== Box office ===
During its opening weekend, the film opened at number one in the United States and Canada, grossing $7.5 million; the largest opening for an animated film at the time. By the end of its theatrical run, it had grossed $48.1 million at the US and Canadian box office, slightly more than Don Bluth's previous film, An American Tail, but $5 million less than Oliver & Company which was released at the same time. Overall, The Land Before Time grossed $84.5 million worldwide.

=== Critical response ===
The Land Before Time holds a 65% approval rating on review aggregator site Rotten Tomatoes, based on 65 critics with an average rating of 6.4/10, with the consensus: "Beautifully animated and genuinely endearing, The Land Before Time is sure to please dino-obsessed tykes, even if it's a little too cutesy for older viewers". Metacritic gave the film a weighted average score of 66/100, based on reviews by 15 critics, indicating "generally favorable" reviews.

Critics Gene Siskel and Roger Ebert gave the film "two thumbs up" on a November 19, 1988, episode of their television program At the Movies. Siskel found it to be "sweet more than it was scary" and "quite beautiful", also praising its straightforward story and remarked that he would recommend it to children over Disney's Oliver and Company, released on the same day. In his own review for the Chicago Sun-Times, Ebert gave the film three out of four stars; he wrote, "I guess I sort of liked the film, although I wonder why it couldn't have spent more time on natural history and the sense of discovery, and less time on tragedy".

Peter Travers of People magazine felt the film had an unclear audience: "The animation is fine. But the Stu Krieger screenplay contains violence that might be hard on the younger ones, [...] and a never-let-up cuteness that can turn minds of all ages to mush". Los Angeles Times writer Sheila Benson also stated that the film's enjoyment was limited to younger viewers, remarking "do dinosaurs really lend themselves to ootsie-cutesiness?" Hal Hinson of The Washington Post wrote "though it's not a great film, it is an entertaining and, at times, emotionally rich one".

Many reviewers compared The Land Before Time to films from Disney's Golden Age. Steven Rea of the Philadelphia Inquirer said that the film "looks and sounds as if it came out of the Disney Studios of the '40s or '50s. Which isn't necessarily a bad thing", calling it "meticulously crafted" but was also "mildly disappoint[ed]" that the dialog wasn't sophisticated as the older films were. In her review for the Sun-Sentinel, Candice Russel remarked, "The Land Before Time works by evoking the simple virtues of this art aimed at children, as it was in the beginning when Disney animated Mickey Mouse".

A review from the Motion Picture Guide 1989 Annual noted that the film "has been called a sort of prehistoric Bambi". David Kehr from the Chicago Tribune felt that the film's title "also refers to the Disney past, but it goes for all the marbles. Its model is nothing less than the life-cycle saga of Bambi, and that Bluth gets even half the way there is proof of a major talent". Kehr gave the film three-and-a-half out of four stars, calling it "as handsome and honest an animated feature as any produced since Walt Disney's death; it may even be the best".

Don Bluth's membership in the Church of Jesus Christ of Latter-day Saints influenced the themes of the film. In an interview with Church News he said, "Everything I do is centered around the gospel. Even our films are, although the secular world would never realize it". Randy Astle said that Littlefoot can be read as a Christ figure because of his special birth circumstances and position as a leader of his people. The journey to the Great Valley, which is to the west, mirrors that of the Mormon pioneers, who moved from fertile lands in the east to the arid and mountainous great basin. Astle concluded that "Littlefoot is both a Joseph Smith—he sees a pillar of light and receives heavenly visitors—and a Brigham Young –he leads his followers across the plains".

== Accolades ==
The Land Before Time was nominated for "Best Family Animation or Fantasy Motion Picture" at the 10th annual Youth in Film Awards, losing out to Tim Burton's Beetlejuice. It received a nomination for "Best Fantasy Film" at the 16th Saturn Awards ceremony in 1990, beaten by Who Framed Roger Rabbit.

Award	Nomination	Nominee	Result
Saturn Award	Best Fantasy Film	The Land Before Time	Nominated
Youth in Film Award	Best Family Animation or Fantasy Motion Picture	The Land Before Time	Nominated

== Home media ==
The Land Before Time was released on VHS by MCA Home Video on September 14, 1989, and on November 22, 1991, as well as LaserDisc in regular pan and scan and "Special Collector's Edition" CAV-play editions by MCA/Universal Home Video in North America, and CIC Video internationally. According to the book The Animated Films of Don Bluth, the original release had "very successful business" on the home video market, and included a promotional tie-in with Pizza Hut in North America, which was offering rubber hand puppets based on the film at the time. Pizza Hut also had its partnership with the film's VHS release in Australia. The VHS version was made available once more on February 20, 1996, under the Universal Family Features label, and was later packaged with following three films in the series as part of the Land Before Time Collection on December 4, 2001.

The film was released on DVD for the first time on April 30, 1997, and re-released on December 2, 2003, as the "Anniversary Edition" for the movie's 15th anniversary, which included games and sing-along songs. The Anniversary Edition was later included with An American Tail and Balto as a three-movie pack in November 2007. A widescreen Blu-ray version was available for the first time on January 13, 2015, which included digital HD and UltraViolet copies, which was accompanied by a new widescreen DVD release on the same day. The Blu-ray was re-released on January 15, 2019.

== Legacy ==
The film generated 13 direct-to-video sequels, which differ from the original by adding "sing-along" musical numbers. Bluth, Spielberg, and Lucas have no affiliation with any of the film's sequels. The sequels have generally been met with mixed reception: many fans of the original disregarded the sequels, while others have embraced the sequels into the canon of the story.

In 2007, a television series was released in North America. It follows the style of the sequels in terms of the morality and the musical numbers (with some of the songs being shortened and reworked).

== See also ==
- List of films featuring dinosaurs

== Bibliography ==
- Cawley, John (1991). "The Land Before Time". The Animated Films of Don Bluth. Image Pub of New York. pp. 103–116. ISBN 0-685-50334-8.
