= Dragon's Lair (disambiguation) =

Dragon's Lair is a video game franchise.

Dragon's Lair may also refer to:

== Associated with the 1983 laserdisc game ==
- Dragon's Lair (1983 video game), a laserdisc arcade video game
- Dragon's Lair (TV series), a mid-1980s animated TV series
- Dragon's Lair (1990 video game), a 1990 NES platform game
- Dragon's Lair: The Legend, a 1991 Game Boy platform game
- Dragon's Lair II: Time Warp, a 1991 arcade sequel to the original 1983 Dragon's Lair
- Dragon's Lair III: The Curse of Mordread, a 1993 video game
- Dragon's Lair 3D: Return to the Lair, a 2002 adventure video game
  - Dragon's Lair III, a 2004 video game
- Escape from Singe's Castle (sometimes incorrectly known as Dragon's Lair II), a 1987 video game

== Other uses ==
- Dragon's Lair (novel), a 2003 book by Sharon Kay Penman
- Dragon's Lair, associated with the British TV series Dream Team
- The Dragon's Lair (novel), the third book in The Lost Journals of Ven Polypheme series by Elizabeth Haydon, 2009
