= Dragon's Lair (GBC video game) =

2001 Game Boy Color port

- Developer: Digital Eclipse
- Publisher: Capcom USA
- Director: Mike Mika
- Programmers: Cathryn Mataga; Jeremy Mika
- Series: Dragon's Lair
- Platform: Game Boy Color
- Release: NA: February 14, 2001; EU: August 24, 2001
- Genre: Action
- Mode: Single-player

Dragon's Lair is a 2001 action video game developed by Digital Eclipse and published by Capcom for the Game Boy Color handheld game console. An adaptation of the 1983 arcade title, players control protagonist Dirk the Daring who is tasked with rescuing Princess Daphne from the dragon Singe. In doing so, players must avoid various obstacles and foes using quick reaction inputs to get from one scene to another. If an action command is failed, Dirk loses a life. A new feature introduced into this game was the tutorial, which allowed players to practice certain parts of the game.

The Game Boy Color version originated as a demonstration of Digital Eclipse's full-motion video compression technology, displayed at the Classic Gaming Expo. It was later presented to Dragon's Lair creators Rick Dyer and Don Bluth, and gained Dyer's approval. Designers Jeremy Mika and Mike Mika brought on programmer Cathryn Mataga to help with development, who scrapped much of what they had done. Capcom USA was ultimately chosen as the publisher for this game due to their prior history with both Digital Eclipse and the Dragon's Lair franchise with Dragon's Lair 3D: Return to the Lair.

Dragon's Lair received generally positive reception upon release, with the developer in particular praised for how much they were able to do to get Dragon's Lair running on a Game Boy Color. Another point of praise came from Craig Harris of IGN, who opined that the game's accessibility made it suitable for the console. Despite this praise, some have criticized the game for poor audio, low replay value, and inconsistent controls.

== Gameplay ==
Dragon's Lair for the Game Boy Color plays similarly to the original arcade release. Players control protagonist Dirk the Daring as he enters a castle to rescue Princess Daphne from the dragon Singe. Along the way, he has to deal with a number of obstacles, ranging from enemies to environmental hazards. Players have to make quick reaction inputs in order to progress through scenes. If they fail to do the inputs in time, or they pick the wrong input, Dirk the Daring dies. Players are given five lives, and once all lives are depleted, the game is over. This contrasts with the original arcade version, where you can continue after putting money into the arcade machine. One new feature is the tutorial, which allows players to practice the gameplay.

== Development ==
Dragon's Lair's animation was executed using Digital Eclipse's full-motion video compression technology; its relative quality was well-received by critics

Designer Jeremy Mika, working for Digital Eclipse, created a full-motion video compression technology, which was first used in the Game Boy Color game Tarzan, published by Activision. Because of the recognition Tarzan garnered for Digital Eclipse, they decided to use it on another game, and Dragon's Lair seemed like a good fit.

A proof-of-concept demo of Dragon's Lair was first shown at the Classic Gaming Expo, where it was presented as one-level demonstration of the game that lacked any sound drivers. Development took approximately eight months to complete. This demo was created by Jeremy Mika, and was presented in high-color mode, which the final version was not. This mode was not used for the final version due to how much space it would take up on the cartridge.

The demo was intended to show what the compression technology could do, but chief technical officer Jeff Vavasour wanted to do something official with it just to see what could be done. At the time, creative director Mike Mika was not sure if Dragon's Lair could fit on a Game Boy Color cartridge using their compression technology, though after doing the math, Vavasour believed it could be done. Vavasour took a quantizer to quantize the current data and some extra scenes, discovering that they would have to the team would have to do more cleanup. The demo had been presented to Rick Dyer and Don Bluth, the creators of the original game. Vavasour made official contact with Dyer to get the rights to make the port, and Dyer responded enthusiastically.

After production began, both Jeremy and Mike Mika were busy with other projects, and so they hired programmer Cathryn Mataga, a programmer who has worked on Game Boy games before who the team were fans of. Mike Mika explained that, when approaching what they had already made, she discarded much of it and began working on how to take the same kind of approach to compress it down.

The compression technology was not able to fit all of the content from Dragon's Lair on the Game Boy Color's 8 megabyte cartridge, requiring the game's artists to do repeated tiling in each frame. A quantizer called tile killer was created to do this, where they would put frames through it, clean up the output, and run it through it again to see if it got big or small. The artists attempted to reduce the amount of data in the art assets, using tactics such as replacing backgrounds with small details with monochrome blocks. The artists had about three months to complete this, causing multiple artists to work "day and night." The animation was reduced to 10 frames per second. The art team consisted of eight members, including Ronnie Fike, Kevin Jamees, and Arvin Bautista. In order to speed up development time, the team received archives from past Dragon's Lair games from Digital Leisure, including an archive of a planned Atari Lynx version, which Mike Mika identified as the most useful. This was because Digital Leisure had a box of floppy disks of hand conversions for the Lynx version, where they attempted the same process as Digital Eclipse. However, this version never got to a quality playable state.

During development, the team had to cut most of the audio out of the game, with only a handful of sound effects from the original being retained.

=== Release ===
Digital Eclipse shopped for publishers who were willing to buy the largest cartridge size available for the Game Boy Color. They eventually signing with Capcom USA to publish the game. Mike Mika explained that the reason why Capcom signed with them was due to their prior history with Digital Eclipse and the fact that Capcom was in talks to publish Dragon's Lair 3D: Return to the Lair for consoles. Capcom initially wanted them to go with a smaller cartridge size, but the team argued that it couldn't reasonably be done. In response, Capcom elected to manufacture fewer copies instead in order to match how much money they wanted to invest in the game. There were also issues with there being only so many types of this cartridge, as well as Nintendo changing prices at times. It was slated to release during the holiday season of 2000, but manufacturing issues forced a delay to January 2001. It launched on February 14, 2001 in North America, and eventually on August 24, 2001 in Europe.

== Reception ==
Reception

Aggregate score
Aggregator	Score
GameRankings	76.50%

Review scores
Publication	Score
GameSpot	7.5/10
IGN	8/10
Nintendo Power	6.3/10

Dragon's Lair has received generally positive reception, holding a 76.50% score on Game Rankings. The Seattle Times writer Steven L. Kent praised the game as a "technological breakthrough" and "possibly the most impressive technological display ever created on Game Boy."

In their preview, GamePro writer Bad Hare praised the designers' seemingly impossible accomplishment in accurately adapting the game. Bad Hare reviewed it in the next issue, commenting that despite some shorter stages and frustrating controls, the visuals were worthwhile for arcade game fans. Nintendo Power staff praised the visuals, but felt that the appeal of the original was lost in this version. GameSpot writer Frank Provo, despite noting some cuts that had to be made, considered the transition from arcade to Game Boy Color to be "amazingly faithful." While he noted it had a limited color palette compared to the original, the artwork was largely unchanged. He did note that the game has relatively low replay value, but it might be enjoyed multiple times by someone looking to master the game. Nintendojo writer Ed Griffiths described it as a "labor of love," stating that fans of Dragon's Lair will enjoy it. He praised the visuals, though felt that the audio was less consistent, describing one voice clip as sounding "horrifically butchered." He also criticized the gameplay for being dated and lacking replay value.

IGN writer Craig Harris praised the game's visuals and technical achievement, and said that its accessibility made it suitable for a handheld console. Although he found that inputs sometimes did not register, he added that this was a flaw of any Dragon's Lair conversion. AllGame writer Skyler Miller praised the game for its visuals, but felt that the audio detracted from the overall experience. They also criticized its lack of replay value and potentially frustrating controls. Hardcore Gaming 101 writer Collin Pierce praised it as a "shockingly good" version of Dragon's Lair due to the hardware's limitations.
