= Thayer's Quest =

1984 video game

- Developer: RDI Video Systems
- Publishers: RDI Video Systems; Digital Leisure (DVD)
- Designer: Rick Dyer
- Platforms: Arcade, 3DO, Philips CD-i, MS-DOS, Mac OS, Windows, DVD
- Release: 1984 (arcade); 1995 (ports); 2005 (DVD)
- Genre: Interactive movie
- Mode: Single-player

Thayer's Quest is a LaserDisc video game initially developed by RDI Video Systems in 1984 for their unreleased Halcyon console, and later released in arcades as a conversion kit for Dragon's Lair and Space Ace. The arcade machine had a membrane keypad for controls instead of a joystick. To help players learn the daunting—for an arcade game—controls, a small holder containing instructional leaflets was attached to the cabinet.

In 1995 Kingdom: The Far Reaches was released, a point and click adventure game for PC, 3DO and CD-i that re-uses the animation and some elements from Thayer's Quest with a new voice over to give the game a new story. A sequel to this reworked version, Kingdom II: Shadoan, was released in 1996.

== Plot ==
One thousand years ago, the Five Kingdoms (Weigard, Illes, Iscar, the Far Reaches, and Shadoan) were united under the benevolent rule of the Elder Kings until the evil wizard Sorsabal allied himself with dark forces from the land of Shadoan. With their dreadful power, Sorsabal destroyed the Elder Kings and claimed Shadoan as his own domain. The Elder Kings preserved their power by parting the Hand of Quoid (pronounced "kwode") - the great Amulet that was the source and focus of all true magic - and creating the Five Relics. They concealed one Relic in each of the Five Kingdoms knowing that, if Sorsabal possessed the Hand, he would wield absolute control over all he surveyed. Indeed, Sorsabal and his dark minions are searching for the Relics. As Thayer Alconred - a sorcerer's apprentice and the last survivor of the Elder Kings' bloodline - the player must find the Relics and restore the Amulet of Power before Sorsabal does.

During the game, Thayer visits only three of the kingdoms and finds their relics.

== Gameplay ==
The game is fully animated like Dragon's Lair but requires more than simply choosing when to fight or which way to dodge in accordance with the animation. Instead the player has full control over Thayer Alconred's movement to different areas and must find and use a variety of magical objects to overcome enemies and obstacles like in most later graphic adventure games. There are many ways to mess up and permanently lose the game. There are several branching paths, resulting in different dialogue. The RDI'S Computer voice sometimes gives hints and the player's score.

== Reception ==
Reception

Review scores
Publication	Score
AllGame	4/5 (MAC)
Next Generation	2/5 (3DO)
Entertainment Weekly	B− (CD-i)
Maximum	2/5 (3DO)
CD-i	86% (CD-i)

In Electronic Games, Roger Sharpe concluded "For the home computer adventurer, who has long eschewed joysticks and buttons for the headier comforts of the keyboard, Thayer's Quest is reason enough to leave the computer behind for awhile and pass some time in the local arcade again."

The home versions of the game received mostly mediocre reviews. Critics disparaged the trial-and-error gameplay, general repetitiveness, limited interaction, and unimaginative and poor quality full-motion video (likened by many critics to a Saturday-morning cartoon). While Scary Larry of GamePro praised the gameplay for being much less linear than Dragon's Lair, he felt this was insufficient to make it appeal to seasoned gamers.

== Legacy ==
A sequel incorporating the rest of Thayer Alconred's journey was planned, but the company went bankrupt before it could be completed. In the mid-1990s, Thayer's Quest was released to home computers and CD-based consoles titled Kingdom: The Far Reaches, with the characters' names changed (Thayer Alconred became Lathan Kandor, Sorsabal became Torlock, etc., because creator Rick Dyer thought the original character and names were "too 70's") and additional animation and puzzles.

In 1996 Kingdom II: Shadoan was released for PC and CD-i, including the final two kingdoms and the final battle with Torlock. Shadoan was developed over nine months on a budget of over 3 million US dollars, with more than 300 animators working on the project. In 2005 the original Thayer's Quest was released as a DVD video game by Digital Leisure, Inc. (true to the original Halcyon version) and could be played on an ordinary DVD player using the remote control. Thayer's Quest was also released for the CD-ROM by Digital Leisure.

== See also ==
- List of LaserDisc games
