= Dragon's Lair III =

Dragon's Lair III may refer to:

- Dragon's Lair III: The Curse of Mordread, a 1993 game for Amiga and DOS formats that mixed material omitted from the conversions of Dragon's Lair II with original footage
- Dragon's Lair 3D: Return to the Lair, a 2002 adventure video game by Dragonstone Software
  - Dragon's Lair III (Digital Leisure), a game based on footage from Dragon's Lair 3D
