= Tapper World Tour =

- App icon
- Developer: Square One Studios
- Publisher: WB Games
- Platform: iOS
- Release: March 16, 2011
- Genre: Action
- Mode: Single-player

Tapper World Tour is a reinterpretation of the 1983 Bally Midway arcade game Tapper for iOS. Players take the role of a bartender with the goal of serving drinks and collecting empty glasses and tips from a demanding group of patrons. The game was developed by Square One Studios and published by WB Games.

== Gameplay ==
In Tapper World Tour, players wander to different watering holes around the globe to serve libations to patrons. As the tender of the bar, players have three or more countertops to manage. Patrons arrive sporadically at the end of each bar slowly advancing and demanding drinks.

Customers are served by filling a mug with their drink of choice and sliding the mug towards the advancing customer. Once caught, the satisfied patron gulps his drink and heads to the end of the line. As the game progresses, customers appear more frequently, move faster along the bar, and are pushed back shorter distances after catching their drinks.

Bartenders must clear the entire lot of customers to proceed to the next level.

Tapper World Tour lets players choose between two playable bartenders: the returning Sam from the original arcade game, or his daughter Nikki, introduced for this installment. The story follows the pair traveling the globe together, with Sam showing Nikki the trade as they serve customers in each new location.

== Development ==
Developer logo

Tapper World Tour was developed by Square One Studios, a US-based company, located in Phoenix, Arizona. It was founded in 2010 by Michelle Bizzarro. Tapper World Tour was the company's debut title. In Fall of 2011, Square One released two more mobile titles for iOS: The Recycler and Season Pass Football with Steve Overmyer. Another title, Shanghai Dragon Club, was in development in 2012.

Warner Bros. Digital Distribution distributed Tapper World Tour for iOS. The game was released in March 2011.

In May 2011, Square One Studios released an update for Tapper World Tour that expanded the game into Europe, adding 40 new levels. A free, ad-supported version of the game, offering a trial of the base gameplay with an option to unlock the full version, was later released in June 2011.

== Reception ==
=== Previews ===
Preview coverage of the game has been positive. Jared Nelson of Touch Arcade said that he was eager to see new version of the original game playing on iOS.

IGN'S Levi Buchanan expressed that he was "really excited for the iOS remake from Warner Bros. because Don Bluth – the genius behind two of my favorite arcade games: Dragon's Lair and Space Ace – has been signed to do the art and animation".

IGN gave the game an 8.5 out of 10, calling it a revival of the arcade original for both longtime fans and newer players.[6] Pocketgamer rated it 8 out of 10, describing it as a strong example of arcade gameplay done well on iOS.

After the 2011 Game Developers Conference, Tapper World Tour was included in PocketGamer's "Top 10 most promising iPhone, iPod touch, and iPad games from GDC 2011" and IGN's "GDC: 5 Great iPhone and iPad Games".

=== Reviews ===
Tapper World Tour garnered generally positive reviews, and holds an average of 81/100 on aggregate web site Metacritic.
