= Dragon's Lair (TV series) =

- Genre: Fantasy; Animation; Action; Adventure; Sword and sorcery
- Based on: Dragon's Lair by: Rick Dyer; Don Bluth
- Developed by: Ruby-Spears Productions
- Written by: Michael Charles Hill
- Voices of: Bob Sarlatte; Ellen Gerstell; Fred Travalena; Michael Mish; Arthur Burghardt; Peter Cullen
- Narrated by: Clive Revill
- Composer: John Debney
- Country of origin: United States
- Original language: English
- No. of episodes: 13

Production
- Running time: 30 minutes (including commercials)
- Production company: Ruby-Spears Productions

Original release
- Network: ABC
- Release: September 8 – December 1, 1984

Related
- Dragon's Lair; Dragon's Lair II: Time Warp

Dragon's Lair is an American animated television series by Ruby-Spears Productions based on the 1983 video game of the same name. Thirteen half-hour episodes were produced and aired from September 8 to December 1, 1984 on ABC.

== Synopsis ==
The series chronicles the adventures of Dirk the Daring, who is the best knight in the kingdom of King Ethelred. Dirk performs all sorts of great deeds while protecting the kingdom and his love Princess Daphne from the forces of the evil dragon Singe. In his adventures there are several original characters like his stallion Bertram, his squire Timothy, and arrogant knight Sir Hubert Blunt who is Dirk the Daring's rival.

Before each commercial break, Dirk the Daring faces a cliffhanger situation. In keeping with the spirit of the game, the storyteller narrates Dirk's options and asks the viewer "What would you do?" After the commercial break, the outcomes of the various choices were shown before Dirk acts on the correct idea (with the occasional exception) to advance the story.

Several enemies from the original game also make their appearance as adversaries: the Lizard King, the Phantom Knight, the Smithee, the Giddy Goons, and the Mudmen. In the episode "The Legend of the Giant's Name", an Ardu giant awakened by Singe forces Dirk to find his way out of an enchanted cave, which gradually transforms him into a skeleton, much like the death animations of the game.

== Episodes ==
No.	Title	Original release date
1	"The Tale of the Enchanted Gift"	September 8, 1984
In an effort to outdo his competition, Dirk the Daring gives Princess Daphne a golden bird for her birthday. The bird, however, is enchanted and kidnaps the princess, delivering her to Singe the Dragon so that he can get King Ethelred to surrender his kingdom.
2	"Sir Timothy's Quest"	September 15, 1984
Timothy's friend, fellow squire Torgren, is wrongly imprisoned when the King's map to his gold is stolen. Timothy sets out in search of the map which leads him to the kingdom of the Lizard King, the true culprit.
3	"The Tournament of the Phantom Knight"	September 22, 1984
The Phantom Knight invades a tournament and kidnaps the King. Dirk the Daring must battle the Phantom Knight, rescue the King, and restore him to the castle.
4	"The Smithee's Haunted Armor"	September 29, 1984
Long ago, two sorcerers gave a smithee a magic hammer. The smithee used this hammer for evil so they turned him into bronze. When the King needs a suit of armor, Dirk finds the magic armor created by the evil smithee and must fight the sorcerers and the reanimated smithee to get it.
5	"The Pool of Youth"	October 6, 1984
Dirk, Daphne, and Timothy travel to Avalon to stop the ancient evil witch Biralla from drinking from the waters of the "Pool of Youth" which will give her the power to rule the world.
6	"The Story of Old Alf"	October 13, 1984
Old Alf the magician chooses Daphne as his new apprentice, but her impetuous use of magic brings the wrath of Singe down on Ethelred and his kingdom. Dirk must battle Singe to restore order to the kingdom.
7	"The Song of the Chimes"	October 20, 1984
The evil Urisk wants to employ magical wind chimes to turn the world into a hot desert that he can rule with his lava men and other fire creatures.
8	"The Girl from Crow's Wood"	October 27, 1984
Princess Daphne and the pauper girl Bronwen trade places when they discover their uncanny likeness. Bronwen uses Dirk to free the evil Sybilla.
9	"Mirror, Mirror"	November 3, 1984
In a plan to fool King Ethelred and his people into believing Dirk is a villain, Singe uses a magical mirror to masquerade as Dirk while attacking the village.
10	"The Snow Witch"	November 10, 1984
Dirk is confronted by a snow witch when he discovers a potion that turns fire to ice. Dirk is coerced into giving the snow witch a vial of the substance so that she can free the world enabling the snow witch and her arctic creatures to rule it.
11	"The Tale of Dirk's New Sword"	November 17, 1984
Dirk and his friends meet Shortbread, the sole defender of the town of Havenwood against the Trolls. The Trolls steal the town's enchanted timber from which they build an invincible war machine and Dirk must help get it back.
12	"The Legend of the Giant's Name"	November 24, 1984
Singe awakens the last remaining Arddu Giant to wreak havoc on the kingdom. Dirk bargains with Singe that if he survives a night alone in the magical Black Hill of Arddu, the Giant will be banished and the safety of the kingdom guaranteed.
13	"The Mist of Wishes"	December 1, 1984
Dirk and Sir Blunt sneak into the dragon's lair to steal the one weapon that will destroy Singe. However, Singe has captured Puck the Elf to extort the secret of the Mist of Wishes. Sir Blunt ends up with the Mist and turns into a bigger threat than Singe when he wishes to be king and successful in entrapping Singe.

== Voice cast ==
=== Principal voice actors ===
- Bob Sarlatte as Dirk the Daring
- Ellen Gerstell as Princess Daphne
- Fred Travalena as King Ethelred
- Michael Mish as Timothy
- Arthur Burghardt as Singe the Dragon
- Peter Cullen as Bertram the Horse, Sir Hubert Blunt
- Clive Revill as Storyteller

=== Additional voices ===
- Marilyn Schreffler
- Michael Sheehan

== Crew ==
- Alan Dinehart - Voice Director
- Howard Morris - Voice Director

== Home media ==
On September 20, 2011, Warner Bros. released Dragon's Lair: The Complete Series on DVD in region 1 via their Warner Archive Collection. This is a manufacture-on-demand (MOD) release, available exclusively through Warner's online store and only in the US.
