= Time Traveler (video game) =

1991 video game

- Title logo
- Developers: Virtual Image Productions (arcade); GTE Interactive Media (arcade/PC/DVD)
- Publishers: Sega (arcade); Digital Leisure (PC/DVD)
- Designers: Rick Dyer, engine; David Salizzoni (arcade); David Foster (DVD); Calvin Lee (DVD); Steve Zuloff (arcade optics); Barry Benjamin (arcade optics)
- Platforms: Arcade, DVD
- Release: 1991 (arcade); 2001 (home)
- Genre: Interactive movie
- Mode: Single player
- Arcade system: Sega LaserDisc

Time Traveler or Hologram Time Traveler is a LaserDisc interactive movie arcade game designed by Dragon's Lair creator Rick Dyer, and released in 1991 by Sega. Its plot is that an American old west cowboy named Marshal Gram travels to various timelines to rescue Princess Kyi-La and defeat the evil time lord Vulcor. The game is best known for its arcade cabinet which displays a "holographic" like projection, produced using optical technology from Dentsu.

In 2001, a home version was published by Digital Leisure in PC CD-ROM and standard DVD format. The DVD version includes a red-blue stereographic presentation intended partially to mimic the arcade original.

== Plot ==
American old west cowboy Marshal Gram (played by Stephen Wilber, also hired to coordinate the game's stunts) must save the universe from scientist turned evil time lord Vulcor, who's found a way to manipulate and distort time itself; and to also rescue Princess Kyi-La (played by LeAnn McVicker) of the Galactic Federation, whom Vulcor is holding prisoner in his quest to disrupt the flow of time. The player must pursue the villain across time through the ages overcoming various obstacles along the way while undoing all the damage done by Vulcor.

== Gameplay ==
Game screenshot

The gameplay of Time Traveler is similar to that of other LaserDisc games such as Dragon's Lair. The player moves a joystick in a specific direction or presses a button at certain points in the game. By entering the correct command, a movie clip plays showing the player's character progression through the game, while the wrong move results in a unique death scene for each segment. The game offers a short tutorial and hints on gameplay.

The player controls consist of a 4-way joystick, an action button and a time reversal button. The latter is a feature that allows the player to rewind and repeat the last few seconds of a failed segment. This gives the player a second chance to try and escape his death without having to repeat the complete Full-motion video (FMV) sequence all over again. Between levels, players can buy more time-reversal cubes by inserting more coins into the arcade machine.

The game starts with three lives and one time-reversal cube, lasting potentially ten minutes of perfect gameplay. Sometimes the game sequences have intentional latency, and "time malfunction" is displayed. It has a total of seven levels called "time periods". Every level consists of randomized FMV sequences within a time era theme such as pre-historic, Middle Ages, the future, and the Age of Magic.

As the game progresses players randomly encounter a slot machine mini-game called "Hellgate" where the player can bet a life to win or lose extra lives or a free credit, or lose the whole game.

== Development ==
The game's action sequences were filmed in San Diego, California, with a small production crew of about five people headed by Producer/Director Mark E. Watson of Fallbrook, California. The game takes place across many iconic settings from different time periods. All the game's footage was shot as if it were a live action movie. Few props were used during filming as the actors had to imagine fantastical locations while being filmed in front of a green screen stage. Some actors performed multiple roles, for example, the same actor played the obese "amazon queen" in the bonus DVD features and a chainsaw-wielding character in the game. The game's special effects, music and character voices were later added at a special effects studio in Carlsbad, California.

The arcade version has two easter eggs: Pressing both game buttons while pressing down on the joystick with a credit on the machine shows Rick Dyer dancing around with his son on his back. Doing the same procedure while pressing up on the joystick shows the game's development team. There are video clips of production footage and interviews on the disc.

The game had a development budget of $2 million.

== Arcade design ==
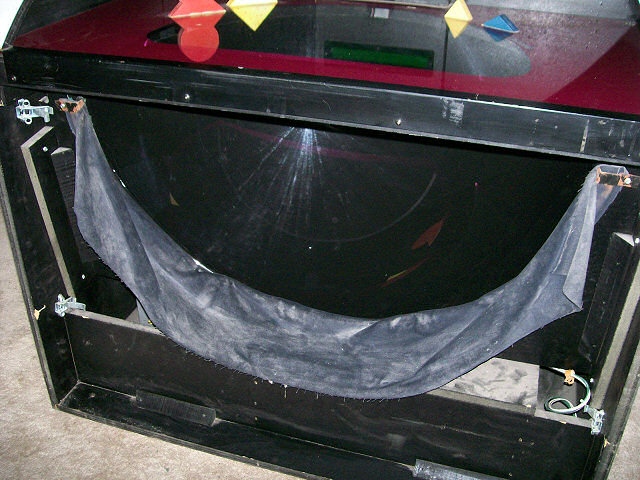
Concave mirror used for the "holographic" effect

Sega billed Time Traveler as "the World's First 3-D Holographic Video Game". The game uses a special arcade cabinet that projects the game's characters using reflection, making them appear free-standing. The "holographic" effect is an optical illusion using a large black spherical mirror and a CRT television set. Characters appear to stand in mid-air as tiny images about five inches (12.7 cm) tall.

Time Traveler has a non-standard shape for an upright arcade cabinet. Though the game is played standing up, the cabinet is larger and shorter resembling an oversized cocktail design (50"H x 43"W x 45"D) (127 cm x 109.2 cm x 114.3 cm) weighing 370 lb (170 kg). It doesn't have a monitor but instead uses a flat, dark stage called the "Micro-theater", which was invented by engineers Steve Zuloff and Barry Benjamin. The Micro-theater is composed of a big concave mirror that lies underneath the stage. This holographic mirror-like optical device was invented by the Japanese firm Dentsu. Along with it, a 20-inch (50.8 cm) Sony TV sits in front of the mirror. The player controls are located on top of the TV equipment. Several neon colored geometric blocks placed at the back of the stage serves as the only background for the game. It is decorated with white formica all around and with a tall "SEGA Hologram Time Traveler" sign on its back.

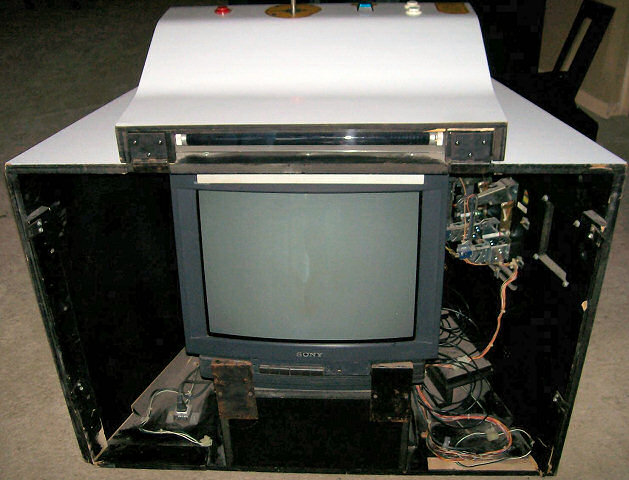
Sony TV inside the cabinet

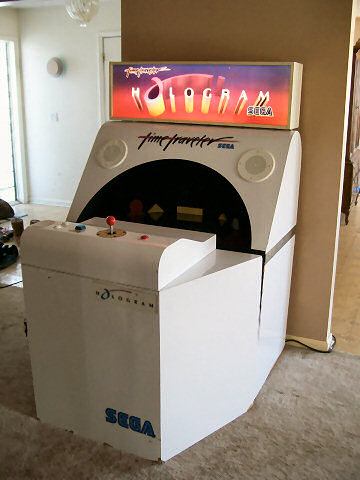
Hologram Time Traveler arcade cabinet

== DVD release ==
In 2001, the game was published by Digital Leisure in PC CD-ROM and standard DVD formats. These home versions have the option to simulate the mirror reflection of the original arcade cabinet through a pair of anaglyph stereoscopic glasses. This adds a whirlpool-like moving background to provide an illusory stereoscopic effect.

As with other Digital Leisure DVD releases, the game's box advertises being "PlayStation 2 [or Xbox] Compatible" on the cover to attract console owners. Bonus features include interviews with creator Rick Dyer about the making of Time Traveler, as well as some of the actors in the game. It also shows behind the scenes footage from some of the scenes without the special effects.

== Reception ==
In Japan, Game Machine listed Time Traveler on their November 15, 1991 issue as being the eighth most-successful upright/cockpit arcade unit of the month. The game generated over $18 million in revenue in its arcade debut.

British gaming magazine The One reviewed Time Traveler in 1991, calling the holographic effect "novel" and compares the structure of the game to Dragon's Lair, although stating "The difference is, Time Traveller does it better than ever before. All the action has been filmed using real actors ... and lavished with a considerable amount of expensive post-production special effects." The One furthermore praises the variety of the game, noting that the game can take twenty scenes to finish, but there are sixty in the game, allowing different playthroughs to play out differently, and expresses that this is an improvement over other LaserDisc games. The One states that "Time Traveller plays well and is an exceptionally well polished piece of software. Although the gameplay isn't to my personal taste, a great many people will marvel at the 'hologram' effect, and have a great time getting the girl."

The Amusement & Music Operators Association (AMOA) nominated Time Traveler for the "Most Innovative New Technology" award in 1992.

The DVD release received confused and mocking review, being given the only 0/10 score in the Official UK PlayStation 2 Magazine.

== See also ==
- Computer-Generated Holography
- MIT Media Lab
- Holography
- Holosseum
- Laserdisc video games
- List of LaserDisc games
