= Kingdom II: Shadoan =

1996 video game

- Developer: Virtual Image Productions
- Publisher: Philips Interactive Media
- Platforms: MS-DOS, Classic Mac OS, DVD
- Release: 1996 (DOS, Mac); 2000 (DVD)
- Genre: Interactive film
- Mode: Single-player

Kingdom II: Shadoan is a video game for MS-DOS and Classic Mac OS published by Philips Interactive Media in 1996. A sequel to Kingdom: The Far Reaches, it was designed by Rick Dyer, the creator of Dragon's Lair.

== Gameplay ==
In Shadoan, players take on the role of Lathan, the last of the Argent Kings, on a quest to recover two ancient relics scattered across the Five Kingdoms. The game unfolds through animated sequences, with interactivity triggered at key moments when the player must quickly select the correct item to avoid peril—signaled by a falling hourglass. Navigation is handled via mouse, using tools like the Scrying Glass, Farsight Window, and Map of Journey, while the interface itself is complete with animated item selections and detailed graphics. The game does require some specific item acquisition—such as needing the Dagger of Arnes before pursuing the Crown of Malric. Magical scrolls from Daelon's Portal must be collected across multiple visits. Players manage inventory through the Scrying Glass, with items in the Pouch only usable once they appear in this interface. Supplementary tools like Lathan's Journal and the Book of History offer lore and note-taking, as well as the whimsical Shadoanomicon. The game also features unlimited healing and save options.

== Development ==
The budget for Kingdom II: Shadoan exceeded $3 million.

== Reception ==
Reception

Review scores
Publication	Score
All Game Guide	4/5
GameSpot	7.3/10
PC Gamer	35%
PC Joker	39%
PC Player	2/5
Power Play	32%
PC Gameworld	35%

All Game Guide said "Shadoan is a wonderful game that will afford many hours of interesting play for gamers. If you are looking for a good adventure game, look this one up".

GameSpot said "If you simply like really beautiful animation and fairy tales, this game is at least worth considering".
