= Holosseum =

1992 video game

- Title screen of Holosseum.
- Developer: Sega
- Publisher: Sega
- Engine: Sega Laserdisc
- Platform: Arcade
- Release: December 30, 1992
- Genre: 2D Versus Fighting
- Mode: Up to 2 players simultaneously
- Arcade system: Sega System 32 hardware

Holosseum (ホロシアム) is a 1992 fighting arcade game developed and published by Sega. The name is a portmanteau of holography and colosseum, due to it being a fighting game created exclusively for Sega's hi-tech hologram theater cabinet, and is the second and last game created for it after Time Traveler. It was one of Sega's earliest attempts at creating a competitive fighting game along with Dark Edge, after the success of Capcom's Street Fighter II.

== Gameplay ==
Holosseum plays similarly to other 2D versus fighting games during its release, which the player's character fights against his or her opponent in best two-out-of-three matches in a single player tournament mode with the computer or against another human player. The player has a character roster of four selectable fighters to choose from, each with their own fighting style and special techniques. Unlike most characters in Street Fighter II, these four characters lack fictional moves. In one player mode, after selecting a character, the arcade randomly selects an opponent. After the player knocks out the other three characters, the player will fight against the same character the player controls, followed by numerous extra fights against all four opponents randomly. Like Data East's Karate Champ, the amount of space to move around in Holosseum is very small.

=== Characters ===
- Dave (Karate Shihan)
- Professor Chen (Chinese Wushu Master)
- Somchay Dompayagen (Muay Thai Warrior)
- Jack Garrison (Self-Taught Martial Arts Expert)
