= Dragon's Lair 3D: Return to the Lair =

2002 video game

- North American cover art
- Developer: Dragonstone Software
- Publishers: WW: Ubi Soft; NA: Encore Software (GCN); EU: THQ (GCN)
- Series: Dragon's Lair
- Engine: Genesis3D
- Platforms: Windows, Xbox, GameCube, PlayStation 2
- Release: November 18, 2002: Windows; NA: November 18, 2002; EU: September 12, 2003; EU: November 8, 2004 (DL3); NA: November 23, 2004 (DL3) Xbox; NA: November 18, 2002; EU: March 5, 2004 GameCube; NA: January 6, 2003; EU: March 26, 2004 PS2; EU: March 26, 2004
- Genre: Action-adventure
- Mode: Single-player

Dragon's Lair 3D: Return to the Lair (titled Dragon's Lair 3D: Special Edition in Europe) is an action-adventure game released in 2002 by Ubi Soft. It is based on 1983 arcade video game Dragon's Lair and follows a similar story: Dirk the Daring must enter the evil wizard Mordroc's castle to rescue Princess Daphne from Singe the Dragon. Many of the characters and locations from the 1983 original make appearances in the game, along with new puzzles, rooms and enemies. Animator and director Don Bluth, who produced the cartoon animation for the original Dragon's Lair, produced new animated sequences for the opening and ending of the game. The game uses cel shading to mimic the style of the hand-drawn art of the 1983 game.

== Gameplay ==
The game is the first in the series to host non-restricted movement for the player. A mostly linear exploration of the castle is broken up with boss fights, many of which are characters from the original arcade game, but not all. Many of the rooms seen in the original are seen again, though some are modified. New mechanics are introduced by the Dragon Essences that grant new powers. Health and Mana meters are also introduced and can be given upgrades throughout the game. A crossbow is also introduced and is used as an alternative weapon and resourceful object for puzzles. Treasure is also brought into the game to act as optional challenges to complete; collecting all 100 treasures unlocks extra gameplay options such as unlimited mana, alternate character skins, and faster sword charging for use when the player starts a new game.

== Plot ==
The story starts as the Princess Daphne is captured by the dragon Singe commanded by the wizard Mordroc. Dirk sees this as he is riding his horse, Bertram, and unsuccessfully tries to rescue her. Daphne is taken through a portal but leaves behind an amulet that allows her to talk to Dirk as he works his way through the castle withholding her. Daphne explains to Dirk how the wizard has become extremely powerful and would be undefeatable without the help of the Dragon Essences: magical objects that grant their users abilities and are each guarded by the strongest beings in the castle. Dirk manages to find the princess and goes into battle with Singe, largely mirroring the original arcade's version of the fight. As the knight walks away with the princess in his arms, he notices a different reflection in a nearby crystal and drops her to find that she is really a dark alter-ego version of himself in disguise. The evil Dirk laughs at the hero for almost falling for his trap and goes on to explain how he is one of the beings holding an essence and that long ago, those who held the essences grew corrupt, thus a civil war between the forces broke out. Dirk defeats the alter-ego and goes on to gather the rest of the essences, but as he gains a magical set of arrows that are the only weapon capable of dispatching the wizard, Daphne begins to chastise Dirk for picking them up. Soon after, it is revealed that the real Daphne speaking to Dirk up to this point was Mordroc impersonating her (much like in Dragon's Lair II: Time Warp). Nevertheless, Dirk travels to where the princess is held captive and duels the wizard, who transforms into a dragon. Ultimately, he is defeated by the magical arrows and the knight saves the princess.

== Reception ==
Reception

Aggregate score
Aggregator	Score			
Aggregator	GameCube	PC	PS2	Xbox
Metacritic	65/100	61/100	70/100	62/100

Review scores
Publication	Score			
Publication	GameCube	PC	PS2	Xbox
AllGame	N/A	N/A	N/A	2.5/5
Electronic Gaming Monthly	N/A	N/A	N/A	4.5 / 10
Eurogamer	4 / 10	N/A	N/A	N/A
Game Informer	7.75 / 10	N/A	N/A	7 / 10
GamePro	3.5/5	N/A	N/A	N/A
GameRevolution	N/A	N/A	N/A	C−
GameSpot	5.1 / 10	5.3 / 10	N/A	5.1 / 10
GameSpy	2/5	3/5	N/A	2/5
GameZone	7 / 10	7.5 / 10	N/A	7.5 / 10
IGN	6.8 / 10	7.4 / 10	N/A	7.8 / 10
Nintendo Power	3 / 5	N/A	N/A	N/A
Official Xbox Magazine (US)	N/A	N/A	N/A	8.1 / 10
PC Gamer (US)	N/A	80%	N/A	N/A
X-Play	N/A	N/A	N/A	1/5
The Cincinnati Enquirer	2.5/5	2.5/5	N/A	2.5/5
Entertainment Weekly	N/A	N/A	N/A	C−

The game received "mixed or average reviews" on all platforms according to video game review aggregator website Metacritic.

== Legacy ==
In late 2004, Digital Leisure released Dragon's Lair III (unrelated to the earlier Dragon's Lair III: The Curse of Mordread). It is based on footage taken from Dragon's Lair 3D, but using a control system closer to the original and akin to their DVD version of the original Dragon's Lair.
