= I-Ninja =

2003 video game

- North American GameCube box art
- Developer: Argonaut Games
- Publishers: Namco Hometek: EU: Sony Computer Entertainment (PS2); EU: Zoo Digital Publishing (Windows)
- Director: Don Bluth (cutscenes)
- Producers: Sebastian Canniff; Jamie Walker
- Designer: Dax Ginn
- Programmers: Ben Wyatt; Lewis Gordon
- Artists: Wayne Billingham; Tanguy Dewavrin; James Norman
- Composers: Nick Arundel; Mark Bandola; Rob Lord
- Platforms: PlayStation 2 GameCube; Xbox; Microsoft Windows
- Release: PlayStation 2: NA: 18 November 2003; PAL: 11 February 2004; GameCube, Xbox: NA: 4 December 2003; Windows: PAL: 22 April 2004
- Genre: Platform
- Mode: Single-player

I-Ninja is a 2003 platform video game developed by Argonaut Games and published by Namco Hometek for the PlayStation 2. Versions for GameCube, Xbox and Microsoft Windows were released later, with Namco Hometek releasing the game in North America. A Game Boy Advance version of the game was announced, then later cancelled.

== Gameplay ==
The main character in I-Ninja has a variety of acrobatic abilities that are used throughout the game to defeat the Ranx army led by Master O-Dor. In addition to basic skills such as running and jumping, Ninja can also double jump, spin his sword around while midair for a limited time and use it to fall slower than normal, and use the shape of the environment to his advantage. Throughout the game there are several uniquely designed walls that Ninja can run on, and points where Ninja can use his grappling hook to swing across a gap.

Certain levels also provide Ninja with explosive darts and ricocheting shuriken to use against his foes; both of these can be aimed using a first-person view, but shuriken can also be thrown with an auto-aim feature. Occasionally, Ninja will encounter an enemy that will leap into the air with him (in anime fashion) to battle, and the two will remain suspended in a sort of flying void until the foe is defeated. While in this void, Ninja flies around and can dash, slash with his sword, perform an unblockable but heavily delayed thrusting attack, and throw shuriken if he has them. As Ninja attacks he will build an attack gauge that, when filled to certain levels, can be spent to temporarily enhance his abilities.

As the player progresses through the game he will gain access to more of these abilities; using them he can increase his strength, heal his life bar, ride a giant shuriken to quickly slay foes, or even become invincible, which allows him to greatly harm enemies in his vicinity without even touching them. When Ninja activates invincibility, he says "I-Ninja!", which provides the game with its namesake.

== Plot ==
The game starts with the protagonist, a hot-blooded yet very rude Ninja in training (simply named Ninja), who comes to rescue his Sensei (simply named Sensei) from the Ranx sent by Ninja's nemesis, Emperor O-Dor. Ninja saves Sensei by defeating the Ranx. Then, a creature comes to attack Ninja which he deals with easily. The creature then spits out a Rage Stone which Ninja touches and goes into a fit of rage and accidentally kills Sensei. Sensei comes back as a ghost and tells Ninja that there are more Rage Stones and with their power, he can defeat O-Dor. Sensei then sends Ninja to find the second Rage Stone in Robot Beach. Ninja then arrives at Robot Beach.

Ninja arrives in Robot Beach and is told to rebuild Tekeyama, a giant robot that guarded Robot Beach before Kyza came. Ninja rebuilds Tekeyama and starts to fight Kyza in which he defeats him. Inside Kyza, a Rage Stone is found and Ninja retrieves it. Like before, he is unable to control the stone at first, and dashes around the area before heading for the next level. The guardian of Robot Beach and creator of Tekeyama, Yang, thanks Ninja by opening the gate to Bomb Bay, the location of the next Rage Stone.

Ninja arrives at Bomb Bay and saves it from many of the dangers the Ranx have set up. Ninja then finds a submarine inside a giant bomb and fights the mechanical fish, Ventis for the next Rage Stone. Ninja then meets the guardian of Bomb Bay, Aria. If anybody saves Aria from something, she always rewards the hero with hugs and kisses, with Ninja being no exception. She then tries to hug and kiss him, while he struggles not to harm her with the rage stone's power. Ninja opens the gate and gets away from Aria, not before calling her a "fish girl" and walking off.

The next area Ninja lands in is the Jungle Falls which is being haunted by the underworld demon, Psyamon. Ninja saves the jungle by defeating the Ranx. When Psyamon finds Ninja, Ninja is not ready to fight so he finds a battle suit which destroys the underworld demon. Ninja then meets Twikki, the guardian of the Jungle Falls (and a passive/cowardly one at that). Ninja also locates O-Dor's Rage Stone which he uses, despite Twikki's warning to save him from an army of Ranx.

Ninja then enters Mountain Gorge where he saves the Mountains from the new, more powerful Ranx. After saving the mountains, Ninja meets O-Dor's right-hand man, Malakai, who can control the elements. Ninja wins and takes a moon-shaped Rage Stone. After a confusing moment of Ninja climbing all over the large stone, trying to use it, a female ninja, Zarola, tells Ninja that the stone was a Teleport Stone, not a Rage Stone which will take him to O-Dor's secret moon base. She also tells him about the stone of life which can resurrect the dead or grant immortality to the living, offering Ninja a chance to resurrect Sensei or live forever. Then, Zarola sends Ninja off.

Ninja arrives at the Moon Base and fights all sorts of Ranx until Ninja finds where O-Dor was hiding out. Ninja and O-Dor then have a battle across space until Ninja makes O-Dor blow up. Ninja then finds the stone of light and decides to use it on himself. Sensei feels disappointed by Ninja's selfishness and floats away. Ninja starts to feel bad and then remembers Sensei saying that "Actions speak louder than words." Ninja throws the shuriken shaped stone at Sensei, and giving Sensei his life back. With everything back to normal, Ninja and Sensei teleport back to Earth. As soon as they leave, O-Dor manages to resurrect himself, ending the game on a cliffhanger.

== Development ==
The game was announced on 5 November 2002, as part of a two-game deal between publisher Namco Hometek and developer Argonaut Games. Initially announced only for the PlayStation 2 and GameCube, an Xbox version was announced on 4 August 2003. On 3 July, Namco Hometek announced that Don Bluth and Gary Goldman would handle the game's 3D cutscenes. On 25 September, it was announced that Sony Computer Entertainment would publish the game in Europe as a PlayStation 2 exclusive.

== Reception ==
Reception

Aggregate scores
Aggregator	Score			
Aggregator	GameCube	PC	PS2	Xbox
GameRankings	76%	75%	76%	76%
Metacritic	77/100	N/A	73/100	75/100

Review scores
Publication	Score			
Publication	GameCube	PC	PS2	Xbox
Edge	N/A	N/A	6/10	N/A
Electronic Gaming Monthly	6.83/10 (Note: Three critics of Electronic Gaming Monthly gave the game each a score of 8/10, 6/10, and 6.5/10.)	N/A	6.83/10	6.83/10
Eurogamer	N/A	N/A	7/10	N/A
Game Informer	N/A	N/A	7.5/10	N/A
GameSpot	7.5/10	N/A	7.5/10	7.5/10
GameSpy	3/5	N/A	3/5	N/A
GameZone	N/A	N/A	7.7/10	N/A
IGN	8/10	N/A	8/10	8/10
Jeuxvideo.com	N/A	14/20	12/20	N/A
Nintendo Power	4.3/5	N/A	N/A	N/A
Nintendo World Report	8.5/10	N/A	N/A	N/A
Official U.S. PlayStation Magazine	N/A	N/A	3.5/5	N/A
Official Xbox Magazine (US)	N/A	N/A	N/A	7.5/10
X-Play	N/A	N/A	3/5	N/A

The GameCube and Xbox versions received "generally favorable reviews", while the PlayStation 2 version received "average" reviews, according to the review aggregation website Metacritic.

IGN's Douglass C. Perry said, "I-Ninja packs so much personality and attitude into its formulaic design that its charm and personality lift it above the fray of me-too titles." GameSpot reviewer Ryan Davis said, "At first glance, I-Ninja may appear to be a simple action game designed for kids, but in reality, it is anything but. The visual style may seem kid-friendly, but the level of challenge I-Ninja has to offer keeps the game interesting for a wider audience." Pong Sifu of GamePro said of the PlayStation 2 version, "An innocuous, lighthearted romp that's been done, and done much better with plumbers, hedgehogs, and marsupials, what really makes I-Ninja more Michael Dudikoff than Sonny Chiba are the cheap-shot challenges that make you replay levels, only against a clock...woah." (Note: GamePro gave the PlayStation 2 version two 2.5/5 scores for graphics and fun factor, 2/5 for sound, and 3/5 for control.)

The game's protagonist has been included on the lists of video gaming's top 10 ninja characters by 1Up.com in 2004 and PC World in 2010.
