= Escape from Singe's Castle =

1987 video game

- Publishers: Software Projects (8 bit, Europe), Electronic Arts (Commodore 64, USA), ReadySoft (16 bit)
- Series: Dragon's Lair
- Platforms: Amstrad CPC, Commodore 64, ZX Spectrum, Amiga, Atari ST, MS-DOS, Mac OS, Apple IIGS
- Release: 1987 (8-bit); 1989 (16-bit)
- Mode: Single-player

Escape from Singe's Castle, also known as Dragon's Lair Part II - Escape From Singe's Castle, is a 1987 video game from Software Projects. The game is sometimes referred to as Dragon's Lair II, but is not the official arcade sequel. The actual arcade sequel is Dragon's Lair II: Time Warp.

== Gameplay ==
Players control Dirk the Daring, the player character from Dragon's Lair, who has returned to the lair of Singe the dragon in order to claim a pot of gold. Singe has laid traps throughout his lair, forcing players to guide Dirk across a number of differently themed screens in order to steal the gold and escape. In the 8 bit versions, there are eight different levels.

In the 16-bit version, Dirk is supposed to rescue Daphne again, this time from the Shapeshifter. Unlike the earlier 8-bit version, this is a cartoon-based interactive movie, like its predecessor, where the player is supposed to choose the correct movement for Dirk in the right time.

== Development ==
Bethesda Softworks developed the MS-DOS version of the game in 1989.

An Apple IIGS version had reportedly been completed by ReadySoft and scheduled to be released in 1991 (manuals from other ports list detailed IIGS-specific loading instructions and features), but was never publicly released. In 2022, decades later with the original ReadySoft port still missing or lost, Brutal Deluxe created and released a new Apple IIGS port based on the PC version.

== Reception ==
Reception

Review scores
Publication	Score
Amtix!	94%
Computer Gamer	94%
Zzap!	90%
Computer and Video Games	80%
Commodore User	8/10
Aktueller Software Markt	9/11
Amiga Computing	85%
The Games Machine	80%

Allen L. Greenberg reviewed the ReadySoft game for Computer Gaming World, and stated that "Dragon's Lair II: Escape From Singe's Castle is an odd creature, an exceptional program which suffers from uninteresting game-play."
