= Don Bluth =

American filmmaker and animator (born 1937)

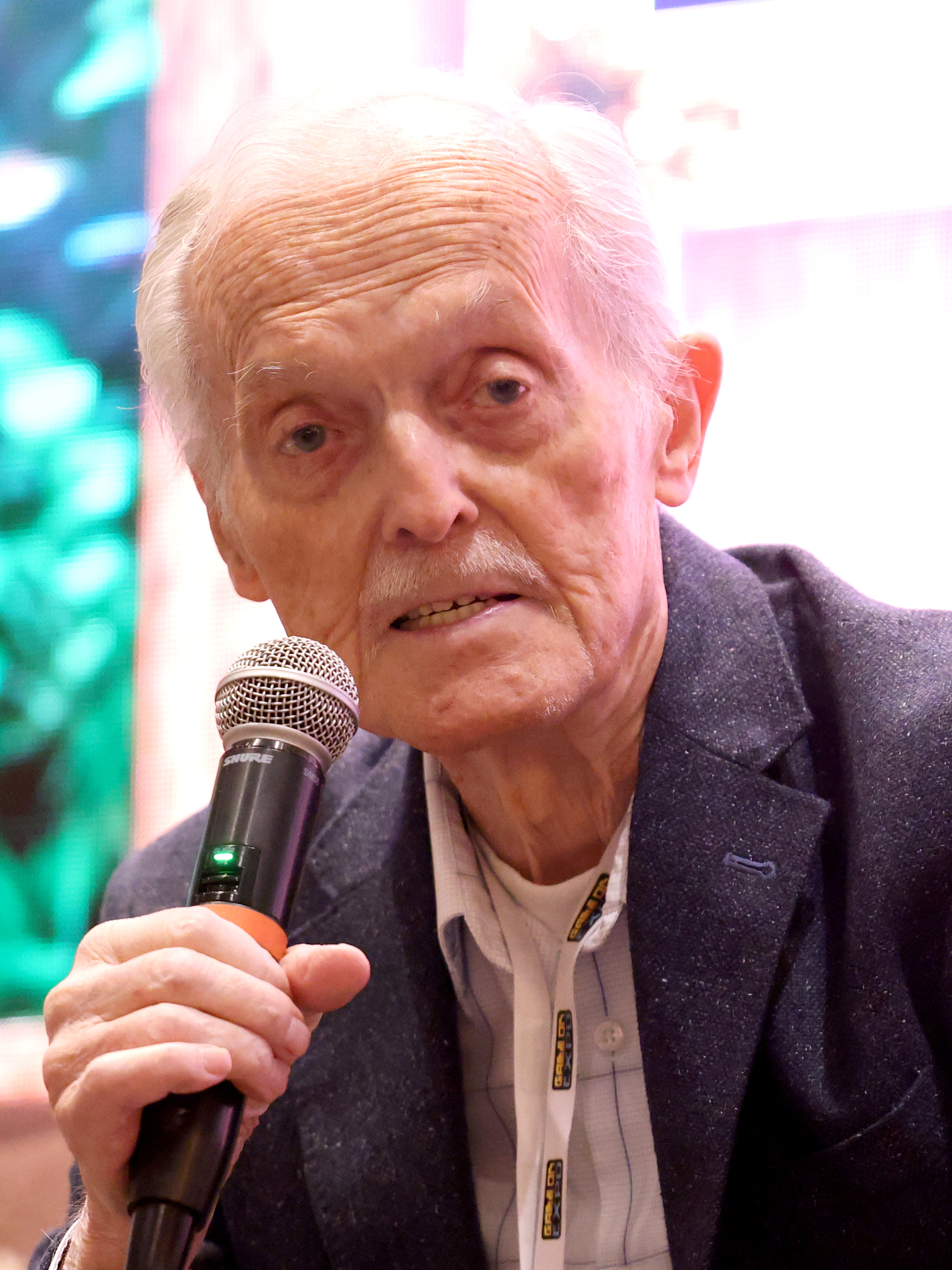
- Bluth in 2025
- Born: Donald Virgil Bluth; September 13, 1937 (age 89); El Paso, Texas, U.S.
- Education: Brigham Young University
- Occupations: Film director; animator; producer; writer; production designer; animation instructor
- Years active: 1955–present
- Employers: Walt Disney Productions (1955–1979); Filmation (1967–1970); Don Bluth Entertainment (1979–1995); Fox Animation Studios (1994–2000); Don Bluth Studios (2020–present)
- Notable work: The Secret of NIMH (1982); An American Tail (1986); The Land Before Time (1988); All Dogs Go to Heaven (1989); Thumbelina (1994); Anastasia (1997); Titan A.E. (2000); Dragon's Lair (1983); Space Ace (1984)
- Relatives: Toby Bluth (brother)
- Family: Pratt family
- Awards: Inkpot Award (1983)
- Website: donbluth.com

Signature
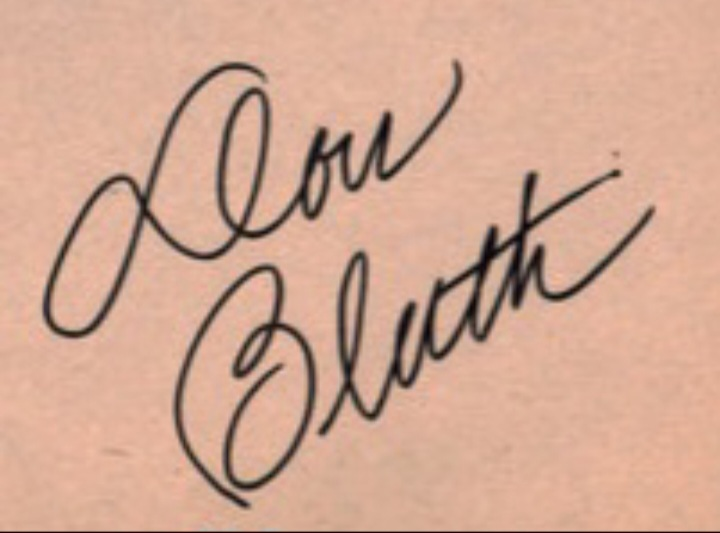

Donald Virgil Bluth (/bluːθ/ BLOOTH; born September 13, 1937) is an American filmmaker, animator, video game designer and author. Bluth came to prominence working for Walt Disney Productions before creating his own film studio in the early 1980s. He is best known for directing the animated films The Secret of NIMH, An American Tail, The Land Before Time, All Dogs Go to Heaven, Anastasia, and Titan A.E., and for his involvement in the well-known Laserdisc game Dragon's Lair. An animation studio under his name hired many animators away from Disney, and Bluth's films were a major competitor to Disney during the Renaissance under CEO Michael Eisner.

== Early life ==
Bluth was born on September 13, 1937, in El Paso, Texas, to Emaline (née Pratt) and Virgil Roneal Bluth. His maternal grandfather was Rey Pratt from the Pratt family, and his great-grandfather Helaman Pratt was an early leader in the Church of Jesus Christ of Latter-day Saints as well as a grandfather of George W. Romney and great-grandfather of Mitt Romney. He is of Swedish, English, Irish, Scottish, and German descent.

As a child in El Paso, he rode his horse to the town movie theater to watch Disney films. Bluth later said, "then I'd go home and copy every Disney comic book I could find". At the age of six, his family moved to Payson, Utah, where he lived on a family farm. Bluth has stated that he and his siblings do not communicate with each other as adults. In 1954, his family moved to Santa Monica, California. Bluth attended Brigham Young University in Utah for one year, and then returned later to complete a degree in English.

== Career ==
=== Early work ===
After graduating high school, Bluth was hired in 1955 by Walt Disney Productions as an assistant to John Lounsbery for Sleeping Beauty. In 1957, Bluth left Disney, recalling he found the work to be "kind of boring". For two and a half years, Bluth resided in Argentina on a mission for the Church of Jesus Christ of Latter-day Saints. He returned to the United States where he opened a local theater in Culver City, producing musicals such as The Music Man and The Sound of Music.

Bluth returned to college and earned a degree in English literature from Brigham Young University. In 1964, Bluth illustrated Affairs of the Harp, a harp maintenance manual by Samuel O Pratt, with dozens of anthropomorphic cartoon harp characters he called "Harpoons". In 1967, Bluth returned to the animation industry, and joined Filmation working on layouts for The Archie Show and Sabrina the Teenage Witch. In 1971, he returned full-time to Disney as an animation trainee. His first project was Robin Hood, in which he animated sequences of Robin Hood stealing gold from Prince John, rescuing a rabbit infant, and romancing Maid Marian near a waterfall. For Winnie the Pooh and Tigger Too, he animated Rabbit alongside John Lounsbery. During production on The Rescuers, Bluth was promoted to directing animator alongside the remaining members of Disney's Nine Old Men. He then worked as an animation director on Pete's Dragon. His last completed project with Disney was the short The Small One; he then left the studio in 1979 during production of The Fox and the Hound. Meanwhile, he produced his first independent film, Banjo the Woodpile Cat.

=== 1981–1985: Departure from Disney and early critical success ===
For The Fox and the Hound, Bluth animated several scenes of the character Widow Tweed. During production, creative differences between Bluth and studio executives had arisen concerning artistic control and animation training practices. On his 42nd birthday in 1979, Bluth resigned from the studio to establish his own animation studio, Don Bluth Productions, along with Gary Goldman, John Pomeroy, and nine fellow Disney animators. To this end, Don Bluth Productions demonstrated its ability in its first production, a short film titled Banjo the Woodpile Cat, and this led to work on an animated segment of the live-action film Xanadu. The studio's first feature-length film was The Secret of NIMH. Bluth employed 160 animators during the production and agreed to the first profit sharing contract in the animation industry. Though only a moderate success in the box office, the movie received critical acclaim. Later, with the home video release and cable showings, it became a cult classic. Nevertheless, due to the modest gross and an industry-wide animation strike, Don Bluth Productions filed for bankruptcy.

His next film would have been an animated version of the Norwegian folk tale East of the Sun and West of the Moon, but the financial resources were drawn back and it was never made. In 1983, he, Rick Dyer, Goldman, and Pomeroy started the Bluth Group and created the arcade game Dragon's Lair, an on rails game which let the player choose between simple paths for an animated-cartoon character on screen (whose adventures were played off a LaserDisc). This was followed in 1984 by Space Ace, a science-fiction game based on the same technology, but which gave the player a choice of different routes to take through the story. Bluth not only created the animation for Space Ace, but he also supplied the voice of the villain, Borf. Work on a Dragon's Lair sequel was underway when the video arcade business crashed. Bluth's studio was left without a source of income and the Bluth Group filed for bankruptcy on March 1, 1985. A sequel called Dragon's Lair II: Time Warp was made in 1991, but it was rarely seen in arcades.

An adaptation of Beauty and the Beast was also planned to be directed by Bluth in 1984, but the project was canceled by Columbia Pictures upon discovering that Walt Disney Pictures had plans for their own adaptation. In 1985, Bluth, Pomeroy, and Goldman established, with businessman Morris Sullivan, the Sullivan Bluth Studios. It initially operated from an animation facility in Van Nuys, California, but later moved to Dublin, Ireland, to take advantage of government investment and incentives. Sullivan Bluth Studios also helped boost animation as an industry within Ireland. Bluth and his colleagues taught an animation course at Ballyfermot Senior College.

=== 1986–1995: Affiliation with Steven Spielberg ===
Teaming up with producer Steven Spielberg, Bluth's next project was An American Tail, which at the time of its release became the highest grossing non-Disney animated film of all time, grossing $45 million in the United States and over $84 million worldwide. The second Spielberg-Bluth collaboration The Land Before Time did even better in theaters, and both found a successful life on home video. The main character in An American Tail (Fievel Mouskewitz) became the mascot for Amblimation while The Land Before Time was followed by thirteen direct-to-video sequels and the animated series (none of which had any involvement from Bluth or Spielberg). Bluth ended his working relationship with Spielberg before his next film, All Dogs Go to Heaven and was not involved with An American Tail: Fievel Goes West, the first film produced by Spielberg's new Amblimation studio. Although All Dogs Go To Heaven only had moderate theatrical success, it was highly successful in its release to home video. He also directed films, such as Rock-a-Doodle, Thumbelina, A Troll in Central Park, and The Pebble and the Penguin, which were all critical and box office failures; however, Rock-a-Doodle would find greater success on home video.

=== 1990s–2000: Youth theater and Fox Animation Studios ===
In the 1990s, Bluth began hosting youth theater productions in the living room of his Scottsdale, Arizona, home. As the popularity of these productions grew and adults expressed their wishes to become involved, Bluth formed an adult and youth theatre troupe called Don Bluth Front Row Theatre. The troupe's productions were presented in Bluth's home until 2012, when their administrative team leased a space off Shea Boulevard in Scottsdale and converted it into a small theater.

Bluth scored a hit in 1997 with Anastasia, produced at Fox Animation Studios in Phoenix, Arizona, which grossed nearly US$140 million worldwide. In a positive review of the film, critic Roger Ebert observed that its creators "consciously include[d] the three key ingredients in the big Disney hits: action, romance, and music". Anastasia became Don Bluth's most commercially successful film and it established 20th Century Fox as a Disney competitor until 2019, when Disney purchased the company.

Despite the success of Anastasia, Bluth resumed his string of box office failures with Titan A.E., which made less than $37 million worldwide in 2000 despite an estimated $75 million budget. In 2000, 20th Century Fox Studios shut down the Fox Animation Studio facility in Phoenix, making Titan A.E. the last American-made traditionally animated film released by 20th Century Fox in theaters to be fully animated and not a live-action/animation hybrid until the release of 2007's The Simpsons Movie. It also stands as Bluth's most recent theatrical film as a director.

=== 2002–2011 ===
In 2002, Bluth and video game company Ubisoft developed the video game Dragon's Lair 3D: Return to the Lair, an attempt to recreate the feel of the original Dragon's Lair LaserDisc game in a more interactive, three-dimensional environment. Reviews were mixed, with critics both praising and panning the controls and storyline, but the visuals were noteworthy, using groundbreaking cel-shading techniques that lent the game a hand-animated feel. As of 2012, Don Bluth and Gary Goldman were seeking funding for a film version of Dragon's Lair. After apparently sitting in development for over a decade, the project raised over $570,000 via a successful crowdfunding campaign in January 2016. Bluth and Goldman continued to work in video games and were hired to create the in-game cinematics for Namco's I-Ninja, released in 2003. In October 2004, Polydor Records released the song "Mary", by the Scissor Sisters, which was accompanied by a music video for which Bluth did the animation.

The following month, Dark Horse Books released Bluth's The Art of Storyboard. This was followed in May 2005 by the companion book, The Art of Animation Drawing. In 2009, Bluth was asked to produce storyboards for, and to direct, the 30-minute Saudi Arabian festival film Gift of the Hoopoe. He ultimately had little say in the animation and content of the film and asked that he not be credited as the director or producer. Despite this, he was credited as the director. In 2011, Bluth and his game development company Square One Studios worked with Warner Bros. Digital Distribution to develop a modern reinterpretation of the 1983 arcade classic Tapper, titled Tapper World Tour.

=== 2015–present: return to animation ===
In October 2015, Bluth and Goldman started a Kickstarter campaign in hopes of resurrecting hand-drawn animation by creating an animated feature-length film of Dragon's Lair. Bluth plans for the film to provide more backstory for Dirk and Daphne and show that she is not a "blonde airhead". The Kickstarter campaign was canceled when not enough funds were reached when the deadline was closed, but an Indiegogo page for the project was created in its place. Two months later, the Indiegogo campaign reached its goal of $250,000, 14 days after the campaign launched. As of February 2018, the total exceeded $728,000. A live-action Dragon's Lair film starring Ryan Reynolds was announced for a 2020 release, but was postponed due to the COVID-19 pandemic. Bluth was listed as a producer.

In 2020, Bluth launched a new animation studio called Don Bluth Studios with animator and vice president of the company Lavalle Lee, founder of traditionalanimation.com. His goal is to bring a "renaissance of hand-drawn animation", in the belief that there is an audience demand for it. His first project is called Bluth's Fables, an anthology of short stories written, narrated, and drawn by Bluth. The stories are intended to stylistically resemble Aesop's Fables and nursery rhymes. The studio's productions are live-streamed first and then uploaded to YouTube. Bluth's Fables was done with pencil tests and then traced and colored in Clip Studio Paint. Bluth's memoir, Somewhere Out There: My Animated Life, was released on July 19, 2022. His first children's picture book, Yuki, Star of the Sea, was released on April 1, 2024. It tells the story of an orca who is captured and taken to Hollywood to become a movie star.

A biographical documentary titled Don Bluth: Somewhere Out There, which chronicles his animation career, is scheduled to release on Amazon Prime on November 20, 2026.

== Unproduced projects ==
Throughout Bluth's career, there were many projects that ended up unproduced or unfinished due to studio closures, his severed partnership with Steven Spielberg, or the video game crash of 1983. Many art designs, filmed animation tests and videos of these unfinished projects still circulate online.

=== Unproduced films ===
The earliest of Bluth's unfinished film projects is a Disney-produced animated short film adaptation of the fairy tale The Pied Piper of Hamelin from the early 1970s. After The Secret of NIMH, Bluth began developing an animated feature film adaptation of Beauty and the Beast. While a few scenes were produced in 1984, the film's production was officially cancelled in 1989, when Don Bluth and the film's distributor Columbia Pictures heard the news of Disney beginning work on their own animated adaptation. That same time, Bluth began developing an animated adaptation of East of the Sun and West of the Moon. Ultimately, the film was never made due to a loss of financial backing. Following Don Bluth's partnership with Steven Spielberg, 1986's An American Tail was released as Bluth's second film instead. During production of East of the Sun and West of the Moon, Bluth also animated a demo reel of Jawbreaker, a proposed television series by Phil Mendez of a boy who finds a magical tooth. The series however, was not greenlit.

Two more films were planned during Bluth's partnership with Steven Spielberg and George Lucas. The first film was an animated adaptation of The Velveteen Rabbit, a story about an abandoned toy rabbit in pursuit of its child owner. The second film was Satyrday, based on a story by Steven Bauer about a young boy in a fantasy world who defends the moon and sun from evil forces. Some of the film's concepts were later realized as the 2014 French animated film Mune: Guardian of the Moon. After his partnership with Spielberg ended, Bluth began planning another film titled The Little Blue Whale with screenwriter Robert Towne. The planned film was about a little girl and her animal friends who try to protect a little whale from evil whalers. Other unrealized projects also included plans for an animated short film centered around a magical talking pencil starring Dom DeLuise, animated film adaptations of the books Quintaglio Ascension, The Belgariad, and The Hitchhiker's Guide to the Galaxy. The latter productions were canceled following the box office failure of Titan A.E. and subsequent closure of Fox Animation Studios. In 2005, a live-action Hitchhiker's film was released by Touchstone Pictures.

=== Unproduced games ===
Following the success of Dragon's Lair in 1983, Don Bluth began plans for seven more arcade games: "The Sea Beast", "Jason and the Golden Fleece", "Devil's Island", "Haywire", "Drac", "Cro Magnon", and "Sorceress". Due to the budgeting issues and the 1983 video game crash, these projects were abandoned. The sequel to Dragon's Lair, Dragon's Lair II: Time Warp, would be shelved until its eventual release in 1991. Blitz Games planned a video game adaptation of Titan A.E. for the PlayStation and PC in fall 2000 in North America, following the film's summer release. Development on both platforms had begun in March 1999 under the film's original title Planet Ice, and an early playable version was showcased at the 2000 Electronic Entertainment Expo in Los Angeles. In July 2000, a spokesman from the game's publisher, Fox Interactive, announced that development on the title had been halted largely due to the film's poor box office performance which was "only one of many different factors" that led to its cancellation. A sequel to the 2003 game I-Ninja was planned, which had input from Bluth. Work on the sequel started soon after the first game's release, but its studio Argonaut Games had some economic problems and eventually closed down in October 2004. The few aspects remaining from I-Ninja 2's development are some concept drawings. A project called Pac-Man Adventures was originally planned in partnership with Namco around 2003 but was scrapped due to financial problems on Namco's part leading to their merger with Bandai in 2007 and whatever development assets were left over was made into Pac-Man World 3 with no involvement from Bluth.

== Filmography ==
=== Filmmaking credits ===
Title	Year	Functioned as			
Title	Year	Director	Producer	Writer	Other credits
The Small One (short film)	1978	Yes	Yes	No	animator: auction scene - uncredited
Banjo the Woodpile Cat (short film, direct-to-TV)	1979	Yes	Yes	Yes	animator
The Secret of NIMH	1982	Yes	Yes	Story	Layout Artist / Directing Animator
An American Tail	1986	Yes	Yes	No	Production Designer / Storyboard Artist / Title Designer
The Land Before Time	1988	Yes	Yes	No	production designer / storyboard artist
All Dogs Go to Heaven	1989	Yes	Yes	Story	production designer / storyboard artist / voice role: Policeman (uncredited)
Rock-a-Doodle	1991	Yes	Yes	Story	storyboard artist / animator (uncredited)
Thumbelina	1994	Yes	Yes	Yes	
A Troll in Central Park	1994	Yes	Yes	Story	voice role: Trolls - uncredited
The Pebble and the Penguin	1995	Yes	Yes	No	(uncredited)
Anastasia	1997	Yes	Yes	No	
Bartok the Magnificent (direct-to-video)	1999	Yes	Yes	No	
Titan A.E.	2000	Yes	Yes	No	Most recent theatrical film
Scissor Sisters – "Mary" (music video)	2004	Yes	No	No	animation director
Gift of the Hoopoe (short film)	2009	Yes	No	No	nominally director / storyboard artist
Dragon's Lair: The Movie	TBA	No	Yes	No	

=== Animation department ===
Title	Year(s)	Role	Characters	Notes
Sleeping Beauty	1959	in between artist		uncredited
Fantastic Voyage (television series)	1968–69	layout artist		17 episodes
The Archie Show (television series)	1969	production designer		special episode Archie and His New Pals
Sabrina, the Teenage Witch (television series)	1969–72	layout artist		58 episodes
Will the Real Jerry Lewis Please Sit Down (television series)	1970	layout artist		episode "Computer Suitor"
Groovie Goolies (television series)	1970	layout artist		16 episodes
Lost and Foundation (short film)	1970	layout artist		
Train Terrain (short film)	1971	layout artist		
Journey Back to Oz	1972	layout artist		
Robin Hood	1973	character animator	Robin Hood, Skippy, Sis and Tagalong	
Winnie the Pooh and Tigger Too	1974	animator	Rabbit	
Escape to Witch Mountain	1975	animator: titles		uncredited
The Many Adventures of Winnie the Pooh	1977	animator	Rabbit	
The Rescuers	1977	directing animator	Bernard and Miss Bianca	
Pete's Dragon	1977	animation director	Elliott	
Xanadu	1980	animator: animation sequence unit		
The Fox and the Hound	1981	animator	Widow Tweed	uncredited
You Are Mine (short film)	2002	storyboard artist		
Circus Sam (short film)	2019	animator		

== Video games ==
Title	Year	Functioned as		
Title	Year	Director	Producer	Other credits
Dragon's Lair	1983	Yes	Yes	animator
Space Ace	1983	Yes	Yes	voice role: Borf / game designer
Dragon's Lair II: Time Warp	1991	Yes	Yes	
Dragon's Lair 3D: Return to the Lair	2002	Yes	Yes	intro and ending: animation director / background artist
I-Ninja	2003	Yes	No	cinematics: director / storyboard artist
Tapper World Tour	2011	Yes	No	animator

== Bibliography ==
- Somewhere Out There: My Animated Life (2022)
- Yuki, Star of the Sea: A Don Bluth Fable (2023)

== See also ==
- Don Bluth Entertainment
- Fox Animation Studios
- Sony Pictures Animation
- Threshold Entertainment
- Vanguard Animation
- Worker Studio
