= Dragon's Lair (1990 video game) =

- North American cover art
- Developer: Motivetime
- Publishers: NA: CSG Imagesoft; JP: Epic/Sony Records; PAL: Elite Systems
- Programmer: Andy Williams
- Artist: David Percival
- Composer: Mark Cooksey
- Series: Dragon's Lair
- Platform: Nintendo Entertainment System
- Release: NA: December 1990; JP: September 20, 1991; EU: January 3, 1992
- Genre: Cinematic platformer
- Modes: Single-player, multiplayer (Note: Up to 2 players with alternating turns.)

Dragon's Lair (Note: Japanese: ドラゴンズレア, Hepburn: Doragonzu Rea) (Note: titled as Sullivan Bluth Presents: Dragon's Lair on the cover art and in-game as Sullivan Bluth's Dragon's Lair or Don Bluth's Dragon's Lair) is a cinematic platform video game developed by Motivetime and published by CSG Imagesoft for the Nintendo Entertainment System. Based on the LaserDisc game of the same name, it is identical plotwise to the original, but features two-dimensional gameplay. In the years following its release, the game became infamous for its difficulty, attributed to its sluggish gameplay and cryptic progress.

== Gameplay and premise ==
The Drawbridge, the first level of the game

Dragon's Lair is an action-adventure side-scrolling platforming game. Players control Dirk the Daring who must complete levels to defeat Singe the Dragon and rescue Princess Daphne. As Dirk, players can walk, crawl, or jump forward, and he has an array of weapons that he can discover and use to dispose of enemies. Dirk also disposes of two meters, which allows him to generate light and take damage, respectively. The game is divided seven areas of the castle and four main levels to play—the Drawbridge, the Entrance Hall, the Gold Mines, the Hall of the Grim Reaper, and Singe's Cavern. Each level is interconnected by a hub level called the Elevator Shaft, which leads to the three other levels and a unique level consisting of one room where the player can recover their gold from the Lizard King, though this specific encounter is notoriously difficult in contrast of his encounters in the other levels. The game supports multiplayer, where each player controls Dirk by turn to achieve a higher score than the other player. The game also features an arcade-style leaderboard system, though it resets when turning off the console.

=== Regional differences ===
PAL and Famicom versions have faster gameplay than the original North American release due to improved framerate. Both versions also use 256 KB ROMs compared to the US's 128 KB ROM.

Furthermore, the PAL version has additional enemies in The Entrance Hall level: spiders, flying insects, and a giant snake boss at the end; a new death animation when Dirk gets flattened; splash screens that appear as the player enters each level, besides The Dungeon stage; and increased difficulty in The Elevator Shaft, with added projectiles flying around. Touching one is instant death. The Japanese and PAL versions play most of the songs faster. Also, a part of the ending theme was changed.

The 30 Life Code was added exclusively to the PAL and Japanese versions. It gives 30 lives to the player after they gain a high score and enter "BATS" as their name. The player will get the extra lives in their next game.

== Reception ==
The game was panned by critics due to its poor controls, sluggish movement, and immense difficulty level. The game was especially criticized for the player dying in one hit from most obstacles (even by touching a door) and enemies, despite the player having a health bar.

GamePro's Charlie T. Astan were one of the few to give the game a positive score, noting it as having "brilliant graphics" and a "high frustration factor", though Astan speculated that with how the player is defeated in "all sorts of amusing and creative ways", that "you might come to like it."

Mean Machines was far more negative towards it, giving it a 21% score, with Julian Rignall starting positive by praising the graphics, but then criticizing the rest, calling it an "utterly, utterly tedious" trail-and-error game, before concluding with "This thing is simply the most dire console game yet seen in the MEAN MACHINES offices and should be avoided at all costs. Richard "Rich" Leadbetter stated "Progress is almost always rewarded by instant death - getting further into the game is just a case of remembering EXACTLY what to do and when." and ended with "I hated every minute I spent "playing" it."

Reception

Review scores
Publication	Score
AllGame	1.5/5
Electronic Gaming Monthly	4/10 (Note: In Electronic Gaming Monthly's review, two critics gave Dragon's Lair a 4/10, one a 3/10, and another a 5/10.)
GamePro	18/25
Mean Machines	21%

== See also ==
- List of video games notable for negative reception
- Nintendo hard
