= Roller Coaster (video game) =

1985 video game

- Publisher: Elite Systems
- Designer: S. Brocklehurst
- Composer: Mark Cooksey (Game Boy)
- Platform: ZX Spectrum
- Release: 1985
- Genre: Platform
- Mode: Single-player

Roller Coaster is a platform game containing some strategy and puzzle elements, which was released in 1985 by British video game developer Elite Systems to overwhelmingly positive reviews. It was, for a time, one of the most popular games for the ZX Spectrum. A version for the Commodore 64 was planned but never released.

== Gameplay ==
Start of the game

The game takes place in and around an amusement park after closing time. The player takes control of the park's owner, Colonel G. Bogey. A disgruntled employee has scattered the takings all over the fairground in the form of money bags. The goal is to collect the money.

To complete the game, the player must collect every money bag strewn across the city-sized amusement park, including those that are placed on precarious perches and in the middle of rides, increasing the dangers when trying to collect them. The player can be killed instantaneously by some dangers in a number of ways, such as jumping from a great height or getting skewered by an erratic turnstile. The player has ten lives and when all are lost, the game is over.

== Reception ==
Reception

Award
Publication	Award
Crash	Smash

A 1985 review in CRASH gave Roller Coaster a 94%.

Four years later, in a review of the budget re-release, CRASH magazine were still full of praise writing: "The emphasis in Roller Coaster is to have vast amounts of fun, and, boy, do you! Each screen is deviously devised, but not difficult to master once you get to grips with the gameplay. And the gameplay—it's so addictive! Don't hesitate to buy Roller Coaster!"

== Legacy ==
Start of Dragon's Lair: The Legend

Roller Coaster was reworked into Dragon's Lair: The Legend, released for the Game Boy in 1991. The plot and graphics were adjusted to resemble those of the 1983 Dragon's Lair arcade video game. As less of the playing area is visible in the Game Boy port than in the Spectrum version, the display is effectively a window on each of the original version's screens, scrolling within each one and flicking to the next when the edge of the screen is reached.
