= Dragon's Lair (1983 video game) =

1983 LaserDisc-based arcade game

- Promotional poster
- Developer: Advanced Microcomputer Systems
- Publishers: NA: Cinematronics; EU: Atari Europe; JP: Universal
- Director: Don Bluth
- Producers: Don Bluth; Gary Goldman; John Pomeroy; Rick Dyer
- Designer: Don Bluth
- Programmers: Michael Knauer; Vince Lee
- Writer: Rick Dyer
- Composer: Chris Stone
- Series: Dragon's Lair
- Platforms: Arcade; Various
- Release: NA: June 19, 1983 (Note: Some sources erroneously list the release day as June 23, July 1, or late July.); EU: Fall 1983; JP: July 1984; AU: 1984
- Genre: Interactive film
- Modes: Single-player, multiplayer (Note: Up to 2 players with alternating turns.)
- Arcade system: Z80 LaserDisc

Dragon's Lair is an interactive film LaserDisc video game developed by Advanced Microcomputer Systems and published by Cinematronics in 1983, as the first game in the Dragon's Lair series. In the game, the protagonist Dirk the Daring is a knight attempting to rescue Princess Daphne from the evil dragon Singe who has locked the princess in the foul wizard Mordroc's castle. It featured animation by ex-Disney animator Don Bluth.

Most other games of the era represented the character as a sprite, which consisted of a series of pixels displayed in succession. Due to hardware limitations of the era, artists were greatly restricted in the detail they could achieve using that technique; the resolution, framerate and number of frames were severely constrained. Dragon's Lair overcame those limitations by tapping into the vast storage potential of the LaserDisc but imposed other limitations on the actual gameplay.

The success of the game sparked numerous home ports, sequels and related games. In the 21st century it has been repackaged in a number of formats as a retro or historic game.

== Gameplay ==
Home version screenshot

The game is "on rails", meaning the narrative is predetermined and the player has very limited influence on its progression. The game consists almost entirely of animated cutscenes. The player does not control the character's actions directly, but controls his reflexes, with actions determined by selecting a direction or pressing a button in order to clear each quick time event, with different full-motion video segments showing the outcomes. The game consists of a sequence of challenges played in a dynamic structure that resembles a random order. Some scenes are played more than once before reaching the end, some of which are flipped or mirrored such that the opposite actions (e.g. left instead of right) are required.

In the original arcade release, the game could be configured by the operator to pause after a certain number of levels and ask the player to insert more coins to continue playing. If the player does so under the right conditions, (Note: In order to be awarded an extra life, the game must be set to three lives per game, and the player must have lost at least one of them when the game is stopped) they are awarded an extra life.

=== Level sequencing ===
Contrary to popular belief, the level sequence in the original version of Dragon's Lair is not randomised, but is instead structured dynamically depending on the player's skill.

The game consists of three cycles, each of which contain groups of two levels. In the first cycle, the game creates a sequence by selecting one level from each group and playing them in order. (Note: In certain instances, the game may also substitute a level with its mirrored counterpart) Once the player has finished all the levels that were selected, they enter the second cycle, where the game creates a new sequence from the levels that were not selected in the first. Once those levels have been cleared, the remaining unselected levels are then presented in a linear order.

If the player dies in any level, they are moved to the next one in the current sequence. Once all of the remaining sequences of levels have been successfully cleared, the player must repeat any failed levels before they can move on to the titular Dragon's Lair. (Note: If the player dies during a repeated level, they simply replay it indefinitely until it is cleared, or the player runs out of lives.)

== Plot ==
The attract mode of the game displays various short vignettes of gameplay accompanied by the following narration: "Dragon's Lair: The fantasy adventure where you become a valiant knight, on a quest to rescue the fair princess from the clutches of an evil dragon. You control the actions of a daring adventurer, finding his way through the castle of a dark wizard, who has enchanted it with treacherous monsters and obstacles. In the mysterious caverns below the castle, your odyssey continues against the awesome forces that oppose your efforts to reach the Dragon's Lair. Lead on, adventurer. Your quest awaits!" Comedic aspects of the game include bizarre-looking creatures and humorous death scenes, and the portrayal of the player character as a clumsy, easily scared and reluctant hero.

== Development ==
Dragon's Lair began as a concept by Rick Dyer, president of Advanced Microcomputer Systems (which later became RDI Video Systems). A team of game designers created the characters and locations, then choreographed Dirk's movements as he encountered the monsters and obstacles in the castle. The art department at AMS created storyboards for each episode as a guide for the final animation. Dyer was inspired by the text game Adventure. This game gave rise to an invention he dubbed "The Fantasy Machine". This device went through many incarnations from a rudimentary computer using paper tape (with illustrations and text) to a system that manipulated a videodisc containing mostly still images and narration. The game it played was a graphic adventure, The Secrets of the Lost Woods. The game's concept as an interactive movie LaserDisc game was inspired by Sega's Astron Belt, which Dyer saw at the 1982 AMOA show.

Attempts to market The Fantasy Machine had repeatedly failed. Allegedly, an Ideal Toy Company representative walked out in the middle of one presentation. Dyer's inspiration allegedly came during his viewing of The Secret of NIMH, whereby he realized he needed quality animation and an action script to bring excitement to his game. He elected to take a reserved but unscripted location from The Secrets of the Lost Woods known as The Dragon's Lair.

The game was animated by veteran Disney animator and The Secret of NIMH director Don Bluth and his studio. The game had a development budget of US$3 million and took seven months to complete. Since the studio could not afford to hire any models, the animators used photos from Playboy magazines for inspiration for the character Princess Daphne. The animators also used their own voices for all the characters instead of hiring voice actors in order to keep costs down, although it does feature one professional voice actor, Michael Rye, as the narrator in the attract sequence (he is also the narrator for Space Ace and Dragon's Lair II: Time Warp). The voice of Princess Daphne was portrayed by Vera Lanpher, who was head of the clean-up department at the time. Dirk the Daring's voice was provided by film editor Dan Molina, who later went on to perform the bubbling sound effects for another animated character, Fish Out of Water, from the 2005 Disney film Chicken Little, which he also edited. The music and many sound effects were scored and performed by Chris Stone at EFX Systems in Burbank. Bryan Rusenko and Glen Berkovitz were the recording engineers. The 43-second "Attract Loop" was recorded in a straight 18-hour session. Featured instruments, all keyboards, were the E-mu Emulator and Memorymoog.

The original LaserDisc players shipped with the game (Pioneer LD-V1000 or PR-7820) often failed. Although the players were of good quality, the game imposed unusually high strain: LaserDisc players were designed primarily for playing movies, in which the laser assembly would gradually move across the disc as the data was read linearly. However, Dragon's Lair required seeking different animation sequences on the disc every few seconds—indeed, less than a second in some cases—as dictated by gameplay. The high amount of seeking, coupled with the length of time the unit was required to operate, could result in failure of the LaserDisc player after a relatively short time. This was compounded by the game's popularity. As a result, the LaserDisc player often had to be repaired or replaced. The life of the original player's gas laser was about 650 hours; although later models had solid state lasers with an estimated life of 50,000 hours, the spindle motor typically failed long before that. It is rare to find a Dragon's Lair game intact with the original player, and conversion kits have been developed so the units can use more modern players.

The original USA 1983 game used a single side NTSC LaserDisc player manufactured by Pioneer; the other side of the disc was metal backed to prevent bending. This made the disc heavier than a typical laser disc, which accelerated the failure of the spindle bearings of the player motor.

The European versions of the game were manufactured by Atari under license and used single side PAL discs manufactured by Philips (not metal backed).

A prototype made its debut at Chicago's Amusement Operators Expo (AOE) in March 1983. The complete laserdisc and ROM sets of this preview demo version have not survived to this day. The European arcade version of Dragon's Lair was licensed to Atari Ireland (as was Space Ace later). The cabinet design was therefore different from the Cinematronics version. The main differences were that the LED digital scoring panel was replaced with an on-screen scoring display appearing after each level. The Atari branding was present in various places on the machine (marquee, coin slots, control panel and speaker grill area), and the machines featured the cone LED player start button used extensively on Atari machines. Although licensing for this region was exclusive to Atari, a number of Cinematronics machines were also available from suppliers mostly via a gray import. The original Fantasy Machine was later released as a prototype video game console known as Halcyon. Dirk the Daring also appeared in the 1993 Game Boy puzzle game, Franky, Joe & Dirk: On the Tiles, along with Franky from Dr. Franken and Joe from Joe & Mac.

== Home versions ==
Dragon's Lair led to the creation of numerous video game ports for home systems. Since some original sequences did not fit in the ports for those systems, they were re-released only in a virtual sequel called Escape from Singe's Castle:

- A nonlinear arcade interpretation of Dragon's Lair and Escape from Singe's Castle with elements of platform and puzzle was made by Software Projects for 8-bit machines in 1986.
- A side-scrolling cinematic platformer adaptation of the game was also made for the Nintendo Entertainment System, titled Dragon's Lair.
- The Game Boy version (entitled Dragon's Lair: The Legend) in particular has almost nothing to do with the source game aside from Dirk as the protagonist, Mordroc as the villain, and saving Princess Daphne as the objective. In fact, the game is a port of a five-year-old ZX Spectrum game, Roller Coaster, the result being a platform game where Dirk has to negotiate a series of thinly-disguised fairground rides. The later Game Boy Color version of the same name, however, is a relatively faithful rendition of the original game.
- Another platformer adaptation of the game was also made for the Super NES, also titled Dragon's Lair.
- The Dragon's Lair Deluxe Pack was released for home computers containing all the FMVs for all three games. Though it contains all the video including some scenes cut from the North American version of the game, the gameplay was reported as lackluster.
- ReadySoft ported and released Dragon's Lair for the Macintosh computers on CD-ROM in 1994. A Sega CD version was also released.
- DAPHNE, an emulator for LaserDisc-based games, can emulate the original 1983 version. DAPHNE requires the ROM files plus the original LaserDisc to run. Alternatively, an MPEG-2 video stream and Ogg Vorbis audio stream can be substituted for the LaserDisc. These streams can be generated from the original LaserDisc or from Digital Leisure's 2002 DVD.

Various home computer adaptations of Dragon's Lair were released during the 1980s and 1990s, but because of (at the time) high memory consumption due to the detailed animation of the games, not all scenes from the original game were included. Reviewers of the home computer versions differed widely in their appraisal of the game, with one Amiga magazine awarding 92% due to the unprecedented audio-visual quality, while another magazine gave the same version a score of only 32%, on account of the "wooden" gameplay. This led to Escape from Singe's Castle, a pseudo-sequel where Daphne is kidnapped at the moment of Dirk's victory by a shapeshifter, forcing him to venture even further into the castle to save her again. The game was made up of unused scenes from the LaserDisc version, though some portions (such as the lizard king and mud men) were shortened. The 8-bit versions were created by Software Projects, while ReadySoft handled the 16-bit versions. These used video compression and new storage techniques but came on multiple 5 1/4-inch and 3 1/2-inch floppy disks.

In late 2002, to commemorate the 20th anniversary of the original arcade release, Digital Leisure produced a special edition DVD box set containing Dragon's Lair, Space Ace and Dragon's Lair II: Time Warp. All the scenes from the original arcade releases were included and optionally the player could select new scenes that were animated in 1983, but not included in any previous Dragon's Lair release. The games were also updated to include higher quality video, authentic scene order and a new difficulty selection to make it more challenging. Digital Leisure worked with a small independent game developer, Derek Sweet, to release a CD-ROM 4-disc box set for Windows-based PCs.

In late 2006, Digital Leisure released Dragon's Lair HD, which features an all-new high-definition transfer from the original negatives (as opposed to just sourcing the LaserDisc). The original mono soundtrack has also been remastered into Dolby Digital 5.1 sound (on PCs that can support it). On April 9, 2007, a Blu-ray version of Dragon's Lair was released. This uses the same HD transfer as the aforementioned PC release but went through a 6-month process to clean and remaster the image. Dragon's Lair Blu-ray is the first title to fully utilize BD-J technology. In 2013, Dragon's Lair was released on Steam via Steam Greenlight. This iteration of Dragon's Lair features 720p remastered video, remastered game footage, and bonus content.

The home conversions received mixed reviews. The Commodore 64/128 version of the game was reviewed in 1988 in Dragon #133 by Hartley, Patricia, and Kirk Lesser in "The Role of Computers" column. The reviewers gave the game 3 out of 5 stars.

GameFan reviewed the Sega CD version, scoring it 297 out of 400. GamePro reviewed the Sega CD version in 1994. They commented that the controls require such precise timing that the game can be very frustrating, and criticized the lack of replay value and grainy video quality, but were positive in their assessment of the game, asserting that "Time Gal, Road Avenger, and Sewer Shark are all coy imitators of the best LaserDisc arcade game there ever was... Dragon's Lair!" In 1994, Electronic Gaming Monthly gave the Sega CD version a 6.2 out of 10, criticizing that "pinpoint accuracy" was required to complete the game, making it too frustrating.

Electronic Gaming Monthly gave the 3DO version a 7 out of 10, praising the superior graphics and short load times. They gave the CD-i version a 7.5 out of 10, with all four of their reviewers agreeing it to be the best home version of the game to date. Next Generation reviewed the CD-i version of the game, rating it two stars out of five. Though they concurred that it was an arcade-perfect conversion, they concluded that "People who like the stand-up version or enjoyed any of Don Bluth's other titles [...] will be in heaven, otherwise it's probably best avoided."

- In July 2010, the iOS version was released by Electronic Arts on Apple's App Store. The game's graphics have been cleaned up for the iPhone screen.
- In early 2019, HarmlessLion released Dragon's Lair under a license from Digital Leisure for the TI-99/4A home computer. It was released as a 128MB cartridge playable on the stock console.
- In March 2022, Brutal Deluxe, in celebrating their 30th anniversary, ported Dragon's Lair to the Apple IIGS computer, using resources from ReadySoft's Amiga, Atari ST and PC DOS versions from decades earlier.

== Reception ==
Dragon's Lair initially represented high hopes for the then-sagging arcade industry, fronting the new wave of immersive LaserDisc video games. Arcade operators at its release reported long lines, even though the game was the first video arcade game to cost 50 cents. By July 1983, 1,000 machines had been distributed, with a backlog of about 7,500. The game’s growing popularity was covered by Dan Rather in a three-minute report on CBS Evening News. Newsweek hailed the game as "this summer's hottest new toy: the first arcade game in the United States with a movie-quality image to go along with the action." By the end of 1983, Electronic Games and Electronic Fun were rating Dragon's Lair as the number one video arcade game in USA, while the arcade industry gave it recognition for helping turn around its 1983 financial slump. Dragon's Lair received recognition as the most influential game of 1983, to the point that regular computer graphics looked "rather elementary compared to top-quality animation".

John Nubbin reviewed Dragon's Lair for Different Worlds magazine and stated that "Most who have tried Dragon's Lair [...] like it - enough to keep shoving 50 cents into it time and time again."

The game topped the monthly US RePlay charts for upright arcade cabinets from September 1983 through November 1983, and topped the US Play Meter arcade charts for arcade locations (such as ShowBiz Pizza Place) from September 1983 through January 1984 and again in March 1984. It was listed by Cash Box magazine as America's third highest-grossing arcade game of 1983, below Ms. Pac-Man and Pole Position. By February 1984, Dragon's Lair was reported to have earned over $32 million ($103 million adjusted for inflation) for Cinematronics. In Japan, Game Machine listed Dragon's Lair on their October 1, 1984 issue as being the eleventh most-successful upright/cockpit arcade unit of the month.

One element of the game that was negatively received was the blackout time in between loading of scenes, which Dyer promised would be eliminated by the forthcoming Space Ace and planned Dragon's Lair sequel. By the middle of 1984, however, after Space Ace and other similar games were released to little success, sentiment on Dragon's Lair's position in the industry had shifted and it was being cited as a failure due to its expensive cost for a game that would "lose popularity". Arcade owners were also displeased with the mechanical unreliability of the LaserDisc drive. In 1995, Flux rated the arcade version 47th on its Top 100 Video Games writing: "A somewhat frustrating movement-timing factor, but still fun to play and watch." In 2001, GameSpy ranked Dragon's Lair as number 7 on the list of "Top 50 Arcade Games of All-Time". It was one of only three video games (along with Pong and Pac-Man) put in storage at the Smithsonian Institution. Lifetime sales exceeded 16,000 cabinets.

== Releases ==
Year	Platform	Media	Developer	Publisher	Notes
1983	Arcade	LaserDisc	Advanced Microcomputer Systems	Cinematronics	Original release
1984	Coleco Adam	Cartridge		Coleco	
1984	Coleco Adam	5¼" Floppy disk		Coleco	
1986	Amstrad CPC	Cassette		Software Projects	
1986	Amstrad CPC	5¼" Floppy disk		Software Projects	
1986	ZX Spectrum	Cassette		Software Projects	
1986	Commodore 64	Cassette		Software Projects	
1987	ZX Spectrum	Cartridge		Software Projects	Budget release
1987	Amstrad CPC	Cassette		Software Projects	Released as Dragon's Lair: Escape from Singe's Castle
1987	Amstrad CPC	5¼" Floppy disk		Software Projects	Released as Dragon's Lair: Escape from Singe's Castle
1987	ZX Spectrum	Cassette		Software Projects	Released as Dragon's Lair: Escape from Singe's Castle
1987	Commodore 64	Cassette		Software Projects	Released as Dragon's Lair: Escape from Singe's Castle
1987	Commodore 64	5¼" Floppy disk		Amazing Software	Republished version includes both cassette versions on a single floppy disk
1989	Amiga	3½" Floppy disk	Visionary Design Technologies	ReadySoft	
1989	MS-DOS	5¼" Floppy disk		Sullivan Bluth / Merit Software	
1989	MS-DOS	3½" Floppy disk		Sullivan Bluth / Merit Software	
1990	Atari ST	3½" Floppy disk	ReadySoft	ReadySoft	
1990	Macintosh Plus/SE	3½" Floppy disk		ReadySoft	
1990	Amiga	3½" Floppy disk	Visionary Design Technologies	ReadySoft	Released as Dragon's Lair: Escape from Singe's Castle
1990	NES	Cartridge	MotiveTime	CSG Imagesoft	Platformer
unreleased	Apple IIGS	3½" Floppy disk	ReadySoft	ReadySoft	Was to be released as Dragon's Lair (1990) and Dragon's Lair: Escape from Singe's Castle (1991)
1991	Game Boy	Cartridge	MotiveTime	CSG Imagesoft	Platformer, released as Dragon's Lair: The Legend
1991	Atari ST	3½" Floppy disk	ReadySoft	ReadySoft	Released as Dragon's Lair: Escape from Singe's Castle
1991	MS-DOS	3½" Floppy disk	ReadySoft	ReadySoft	
1991	MS-DOS	3½" Floppy disk	ReadySoft	ReadySoft	Released as Dragon's Lair: Escape from Singe's Castle (includes some non-original arcade levels)
1991	MS-DOS	3½" Floppy disk	ReadySoft	ReadySoft	Released as Dragon's Lair: Escape from Singe's Castle
1991	Macintosh	3½" Floppy disk		ReadySoft	Released as Dragon's Lair: Escape from Singe's Castle
1993	Super NES	Cartridge	MotiveTime	Data East	Platformer, Published by Konami as Dragon's Magic (ドラゴンズマジック, Doragonzumajikku) in Japan.
1993	Sega CD	CD-ROM	Epicenter Interactive	ReadySoft	
1993	MS-DOS	CD-ROM		ReadySoft	
1993	3DO	CD-ROM		ReadySoft	
unreleased	Genesis	Cartridge	Eden Entertainment Software	Sega / Taito	Was to be released as Dragon's Lair: The Adventure Continues.
1994	Macintosh	CD-ROM	ReadySoft	ReadySoft	
1994	CD-i	CD-ROM		ReadySoft	
1995	Jaguar CD	CD-ROM	ReadySoft	ReadySoft	
1997	Windows 95	CD-ROM		Digital Leisure	Released as Deluxe Pack (also contained Space Ace and Dragon's Lair II: Time Warp)
1997	Windows	DVD		Digital Leisure	
1998	Home DVD players	DVD		Digital Leisure	
1998	Windows 98	DVD		Digital Leisure	
2000	Game Boy Color	Cartridge	Digital Eclipse	Capcom	
2001	Windows XP	CD-ROM		Digital Leisure	Arcade authentic
2002	Home DVD players	DVD		Digital Leisure	Released as 20th Anniversary Pack
2002	Macintosh	DVD		Digital Leisure	
2003	Windows XP	CD-ROM		Digital Leisure	Released as 20th Anniversary Pack
2005	Mobile Phone	Download	MMJ Games	Starwave	
2006	Windows XP	DVD		Digital Leisure	High Definition WMV
2007	Home Blu-ray players	BD-R	Infinite HD	Digital Leisure	
2007	PlayStation 3	BD-R	Infinite HD	Digital Leisure	
2007	Home HD DVD players	HD DVD	Infinite HD	Digital Leisure	
2007	Xbox 360	HD DVD		Digital Leisure	
2007	Windows	DVD		Digital Leisure	20th Anniversary Pack released on 1 DVD instead of 4 disks
2009	iPhone	Download	Digital Leisure	Electronic Arts	
2009	Nintendo DSi	Download	Code Mystics	Digital Leisure	
2010	Wii	Wii Optical Disc	Digital Leisure	Destineer	Released as Dragon's Lair Trilogy (includes Dragon's Lair, Dragon's Lair II: Time Warp, and Space Ace)
2010	iPad	App Store	Digital Leisure	Dragon's Lair LLC	
2010	Nintendo DS	DS Game Card	Code Mystics	Destineer	
2010	PlayStation Network	Download	Digital Leisure	Digital Leisure	
2011	PSP	Download	Digital Leisure	Digital Leisure	
2011	Android	Download	Digital Leisure	Digital Leisure	
2011	Nintendo 3DS	Download	Digital Leisure	Digital Leisure	
2012	Xbox Live Arcade	Download	Digital Leisure	Microsoft Studios	Kinect-enabled version with Xbox 360 controller
2013	Windows	Download (Steam)	Digital Leisure	Digital Leisure	
2013	macOS	Download (Steam)	Digital Leisure	Digital Leisure	
2017	Linux	Download (Steam)	Digital Leisure	Digital Leisure	
2017	PlayStation 4	Download (PSN)	Digital Leisure	Digital Leisure	Released as Dragon's Lair Trilogy (includes Dragon's Lair, Dragon's Lair II: Time Warp, and Space Ace)
2019	Nintendo Switch	Download	Digital Leisure	Digital Leisure	Released as Dragon's Lair Trilogy (includes Dragon's Lair, Dragon's Lair II: Time Warp, and Space Ace)
2019	TI-99/4A	Cartridge	HarmlessLion	HarmlessLion	Limited run of cartridges produced under a license from Digital Leisure
2019	Xbox One	Download	Digital Leisure	Digital Leisure	Released as Dragon's Lair Trilogy (includes Dragon's Lair, Dragon's Lair II: Time Warp, and Space Ace)
2022	Apple IIGS	Download	Brutal Deluxe	Brutal Deluxe	Released as Dragon's Lair, Dragon's Lair: Escape from Singe's Castle, Dragon's Lair II: Time Warp

== Cultural references ==
Dragon's Lair appears in the Stranger Things episode "Chapter One: MADMAX" (2017).

== See also ==
- Dragon's Lair (TV series) (1984–85)
- List of LaserDisc games
