= Dragon's Lair: The Legend =

1991 video game

- North American box art
- Developer: Elite Systems
- Publishers: NA: CSG Imagesoft; EU: Elite Systems; JP: Epic/Sony Records
- Programmer: Mark Crane
- Artist: David Percival
- Composer: Mark Cooksey
- Series: Dragon's Lair
- Platform: Game Boy
- Release: JP: October 25, 1991; NA: January 1991; EU: 1991
- Genre: Platform
- Mode: Single-player

Dragon's Lair: The Legend is a 1991 platform video game developed by Elite Systems and published by CSG Imagesoft for the Game Boy. The game is part of the Dragon's Lair franchise and stars Dirk the Daring, who explores the world attempting to collect all 194 fragments of the mythical Life Stone. The gameplay is an extreme departure from other games in the series as it includes no enemies and aside from its protagonist, no other established characters. It does however retain the grueling difficulty that the series is known for.

== Plot ==
Dirk the Daring held the maid's limp and lifeless body gently in his arms, as he surveyed the carnage of the bloody battle scene. With the last gasps of her dying breath, Princess Daphne's loyal servant, Dirk, had been told the horrible tale of their undoing. It seemed a traitor in their ranks had informed the evil Mordroc that the princess' caravan was carrying the mythical Life Stone, an ancient artifact rumored to give its owner limitless power and eternal life. His barbaric army had ambushed the princess' helpless band, mercilessly slaying all but the beautiful Princess whom they had taken into captivity. Fortunately, before the attack, the maid has used her limited powers of sorcery to shatter the Life Stone into hundreds of pieces and scatter them throughout the land. Dirk knew what he must now do, though he did not relish the task. The Life Stone must be reassembled before Princess Daphne could be rescued from Mordroc's evil clutches!

== Gameplay ==
The player can use either the A or B button to jump and left or right on the control pad to walk. The Start button pauses and the Select button resets if pressed on the pause screen.

The goal of the game is to move screen-by-screen collecting all 194 fragments of the Life Stone, then reach the final screen where the Good Knight lies in a deathlike trance. Each screen has a set width and the player advances to the next by reaching the edge. Dirk begins with 10 lives and loses a life by either landing on a deadly object (certain spikes, rail tracks, deadly water), falling from a great height, or depleting all of his energy meter. Dirk has no weapon, as there are no enemies or bosses. There is also no on-screen display that shows the player their remaining lives, energy meter, number of Life Stone fragments collected, or score. Only after a death does the game show the remaining lives and fragments collected. The score is revealed after a game over.

The world consists of 11 distinct regions covering themes from the medieval Dragon's Lair setting.

== Regional differences ==
There are some differences in gameplay between the European release and the Japanese/North American releases:

=== Fall damage ===
In US/JP versions, falling from about two-thirds screen height is an instant death. Fall damage can be canceled if Dirk transitions to a new screen mid-fall, collects a stone fragment, or lands on a moving platform. The EU version does not include any fall damage at all.

=== Extra lives ===
In all versions, the player begins with 10 lives. In the EU release, Dirk is given 1 extra life for every 42 Life Stones collected but never exceeds the maximum of 10. Extra lives are not awarded at all in US/JP versions.

=== Infinite jumping ===
In the US/JP versions, holding down the jump button will make Dirk continuously jump. In the EU version, holding down jump will only jump once but tapping quickly will register inputs fast enough to simulate infinite jumping.

=== Design differences ===
In the EU version, there's a large gap between the mine cart in "The Cells" and the beginning of the track, leaving Dirk more room to jump onto it. In US/JP versions, the mine cart has been re-positioned against the far edge of the track. This can result in the player unintentionally launching the cart before jumping onto it.

In "The Cells," there's a long moving platform where Dirk has to elevate to the top of the screen and jump through a narrow gap. In the EU version, this gap is twice as wide as the US/JP versions.

== Development and reception ==
Reception

Review scores
Publication	Score
Electronic Gaming Monthly	NA: 17 / 40
GamePro	NA: 2 / 5
ASM	EU: 75%
Consoles Plus	EU: 93%
Player One	EU: 59%
Power Play	EU: 69%
VideoGame	EU: 5/5

Developed by Elite Systems, the game is a port and re-skin of the 1985 ZX Spectrum game Roller Coaster. Even though the graphics have been altered to a medieval theme, many areas resemble amusement park rides. There are three mine cart sections that were clearly roller coasters, spinning objects that match a Ferris wheel, and several buildings that were once bumper car rides. Elite Systems acted as publisher for European regions, Epic/Sony Records published in Japan, and CSG Imagesoft and UbiSoft both published North American versions.

The US version of the game received almost entirely negative reviews. EGM rated the game a 17 out of 40. It currently holds a 1.63 out of 5 user rating on GameFAQs, placing it 1,052 out of 1,068 Game Boy games.

Reviews of the European version were more favorable, even receiving scores as high as 93% and 5/5 stars.
