= Dragon's Lair III: The Curse of Mordread =

1992 video game

- Developer: Don Bluth Multimedia
- Publisher: ReadySoft
- Designers: Tony Bozek; David Quesnelle
- Composer: Shawn Moore
- Series: Dragon's Lair
- Platforms: Amiga, Atari ST, MS-DOS, Apple IIGS
- Release: 1992
- Mode: Single-player

Dragon's Lair III: The Curse of Mordread is a video game in the Dragon's Lair series, developed by Don Bluth Multimedia and published by ReadySoft for the Amiga, Atari ST and MS-DOS in 1992. An Apple IIGS port was released in 2022.

It mixes original footage with scenes from Dragon's Lair II: Time Warp that were not included in the original PC release due to memory constraints. The game also includes a newly produced "Blackbeard the Pirate" stage that was originally intended to be in the arcade game but was never completed.

== Plot ==
The wizard Mordroc's witch sister Mordread seeks revenge for her brother's death and captures Dirk the Daring's homestead into an orb on her staff. Dirk was not in the house, so he begins pursuing Mordread to restore his home, and Princess Daphne inside it.

Two levels also in Dragon's Lair II ("Dirk in Wonderland" and "Beethoven's Creative Gust") are featured, in addition to said game's lost and unfinished "Blackbeard the Pirate", and the final stage is an original one: "Father Time's Castle".

== Critical reception ==
Reception

Aggregate score
| Aggregator | Score |
|---|---|
| Metacritic | 23/100 |

Review scores
| Publication | Score |
|---|---|
| Amiga Action | 74% |
| Amiga Computing | 41% |
| Amiga Format | 57% |
| Amiga Power | 24% |

The game received generally negative reviews in the gaming press when released. Reviewers praised the graphics, sound effects, and humor, but were critical of the limited gameplay.
