= Space Ace =

1983 LaserDisc-based arcade game

- North American arcade flyer
- Developer: Advanced Microcomputer Systems
- Publishers: Cinematronics; Digital Leisure (current)
- Producers: Rick Dyer; Don Bluth
- Designer: Don Bluth
- Platform: Arcade: Amiga, Apple IIGS, 3DO, CD-i, Jaguar CD, Macintosh, MS-DOS, Atari ST, Sega CD, DVD Player, Blu-ray, Wii, DSiWare, iOS, PlayStation 3, Android, Nintendo Switch
- Release: NA: December 1983 (limited); NA: April 29 1984 (wide release); EU: April 1984; JP: July 1984
- Genre: Interactive movie
- Mode: Up to 2 players alternating turns

Space Ace is a LaserDisc video game produced by Bluth Group, Cinematronics and Advanced Microcomputer Systems (later renamed RDI Video Systems). It was unveiled in October 1983, just four months after the Dragon's Lair game, followed by a limited release in December 1983 and a wide release on April 29, 1984. Like its predecessor, it uses film-quality animation played back from a LaserDisc.

The gameplay is similar to Dragon's Lair, requiring the player to move the joystick or press the fire button at key moments in the animated sequences to govern the hero's actions. There is also the occasional option to either temporarily have the character transform into his adult form or remain as a boy with different styles of challenge.

The arcade game was a commercial success in North America, but was unable to achieve the same level of success as Dragon's Lair. It was ported to a number of home systems.

== Gameplay ==
Arcade version screenshot

Like Dragon's Lair, Space Ace is composed of numerous individual scenes, which require the player to move the joystick in the right direction or press the fire button at the right moment to overcome the various hazards Dexter/Ace faces. Space Ace introduced a few gameplay enhancements, most notably selectable skill levels and multiple paths through several of the scenes. At the start of the game, the player could select one of three skill levels: "Cadet", "Captain" or "Space Ace" for easy, medium and hard respectively; only by choosing the toughest skill level could the player see all the sequences in the game (only around half the scenes are played on the easiest setting). A number of the scenes had "multiple choice" moments when the player could select how to act, sometimes by deciding which way to turn in a passageway, or by choosing whether or not to react to the on-screen "ENERGIZE" message and transform back into his Ace form. Most scenes also have separate, horizontally flipped versions. Dexter usually progresses through scenes by avoiding obstacles and enemies, but Ace goes on the offensive, attacking enemies rather than running away; although Dexter does occasionally have to use his pistol on enemies when it is necessary to advance. An example can be seen in the first scene of the game, when Dexter is escaping from Borf's robot drones. If the player presses the fire button at the right moment, Dexter transforms temporarily into Ace and can fight them, whereas if the player chooses to stay as Dexter, the robots' drill attacks must be dodged instead.

== Plot ==
Space Ace follows the adventures of the dashing hero Dexter, better known as "Ace". Ace is on a mission to stop the villainous Commander Borf, who is seeking to attack Earth with his "Infanto Ray" to render Earthlings helpless by reverting them into infants. At the start of the game, Ace is partially hit by the Infanto Ray, which reverts him into an adolescent, and Borf kidnaps his female sidekick Kimberly, who thus becomes the game's damsel in distress. It is up to the player to guide Ace, in his adolescent form of Dexter, through a series of obstacles in pursuit of Borf, in order to rescue Kimberly and prevent Borf from using the Infanto Ray to conquer Earth. However, Dexter has a wristwatch gadget which optionally allows him to "ENERGIZE" and temporarily reverse the effects of the Infanto-Ray, to turn him back into Ace for a short time and overcome more difficult obstacles in a heroic manner. The game's attract mode introduces the player to the story via narration and dialogue.

== Voice cast ==
- Will Finn as Dexter/Baby Borf
- Jeff Etter as Ace
- Lorna Cook as Kimberly
- Don Bluth as Borf/Aliens/Dark Side Dexter/Dark Side Ace
- Michael Rye as Narrator

== Development ==
The animation for Space Ace was produced by the same team that tackled the earlier Dragon's Lair, headed by ex-Disney animator Don Bluth. To keep the production costs down, the studio again chose to use its staff to provide voices for the characters rather than hire actors (one exception is Michael Rye, who reprises his role as the narrator of the attract sequence in Dragon's Lair). Bluth himself provides the (electronically altered) voice of Commander Borf. In an interview about the game, Bluth stated that had the studio been able to afford more professional actors, he thought Paul Shenar would have been more suitable for the role of Borf than himself. The game's animation features some rotoscoping, wherein models were built of Ace's spaceship "Star Pac", his motorcycle, and the tunnel in the game's dogfight sequence, then filmed and traced over to render moving animated images with very realistic depth and perspective.

The game's budget was $2.5 million.

=== Format ===
Space Ace was made available to distributors in two different formats: a dedicated cabinet, and a conversion kit that could be used to turn an existing copy of Dragon's Lair into a Space Ace game. Early version #1 production units of the dedicated Space Ace game were actually issued in Dragon's Lair style cabinets. The latter version #2 dedicated Space Ace units came in a different, inverted style cabinet. The conversion kit included the Space Ace LaserDisc, new EPROMs containing the game program, an additional circuit board to add the skill level buttons, and replacement artwork for the cabinet. The game originally used the Pioneer LD-V1000 or PR-7820 LaserDisc players, but an adaptor kit now exists to allow Sony LDP series players to be used as replacements if the original player is no longer functional.

== Ports ==
Numerous versions of Space Ace were created for home computers and game systems, most of which attempted to mimic the arcade version's lushly animated hand-drawn footage, with varying degrees of success. Along with the floppy disk-based versions for Amiga, Apple IIGS, Atari ST, MS-DOS and Macintosh, ReadySoft issued a CD-ROM version featuring downsampled video for MS-DOS and Macintosh which preserved almost all of the original LaserDisc content. A sequel, Space Ace II: Borf's Revenge, was created and shipped on floppy disk for the aforementioned computer platforms mixing new animation with scenes from the original game that were left out of the previous version due to large file sizes.

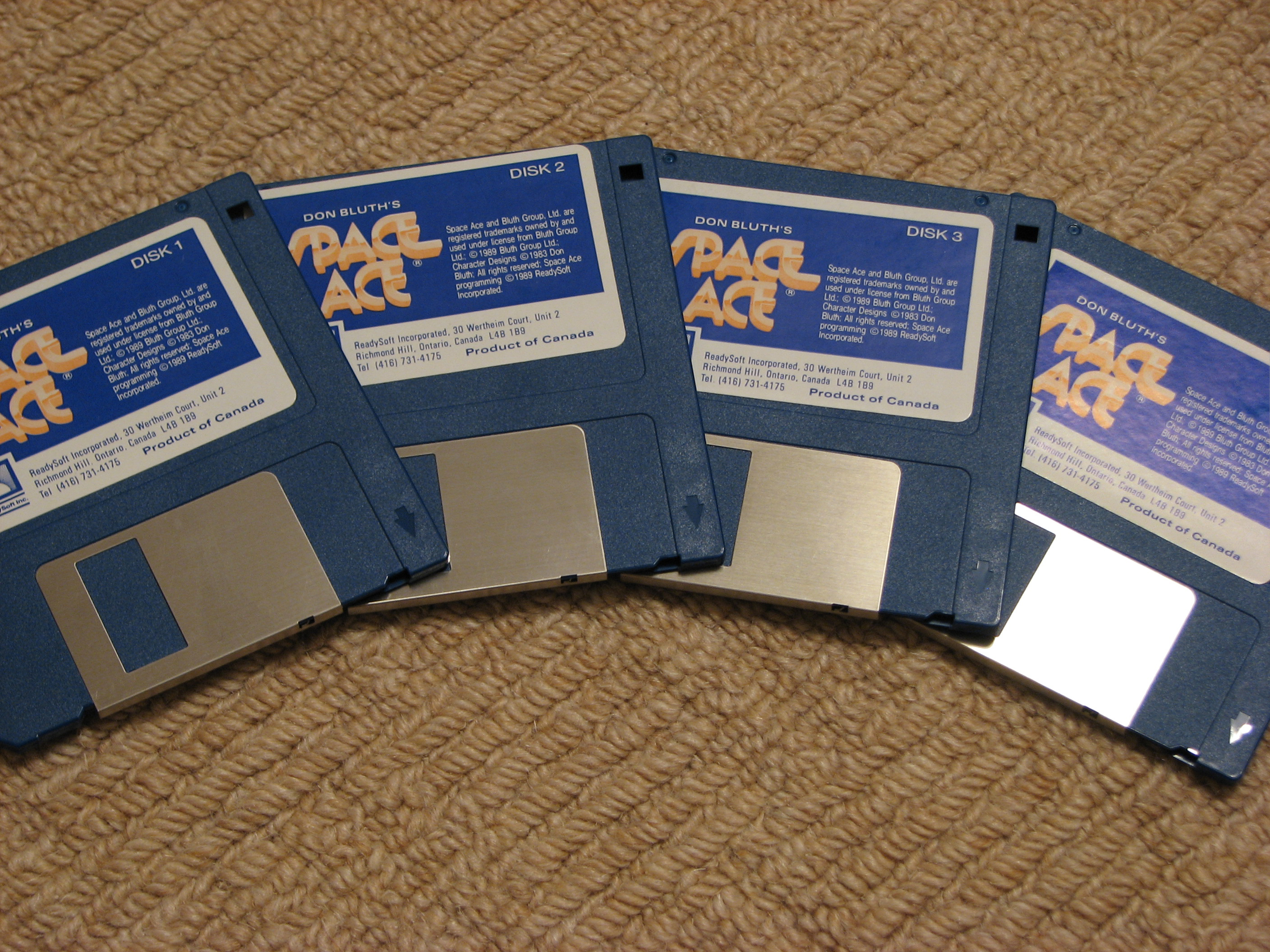
The Atari ST version of the game which used 4 floppy disks

In 1991, Leland Corporation released a slightly updated version of Space Ace in the form of a conversion kit for the then recently released Dragon's Lair II: Time Warp. The updated version added more complicated moves (including diagonal moves), and dropped the easier skill levels, meaning only the "Ace" (difficult) level could be played.

In 1993, Space Ace was released for the Philips CD-i (Compact Disc Interactive). It was later released on the Sega CD in 1994.

Space Ace was also released for the Super NES by Absolute Entertainment in 1994 under the same name. Because a SNES cartridge has limited storage however, it ended up being a top-down perspective action game with levels based on the scenes from the original. In order to see the credits, the player must get an "Ace" rank on every level, meaning that they must have near-perfect accuracy and collect all the disks found throughout the game. However, some scenes from the original have been kept in video format albeit in low resolution.

A port for the Sega Saturn was to be released in November 1995, but was cancelled for unknown reasons.

The Dragon's Lair Deluxe Pack released by Digital Leisure in 1997 featured Space Ace along with both arcade Dragon's Lair games. They also released a version of Space Ace on DVD that could be played on most DVD players, although it lacked the skill level select of the arcade version, and also played somewhat differently (if the player made a mistake on the arcade version they simply picked up again roughly where they left off, whereas the DVD version made the player replay the entire scene from the beginning).

DAPHNE, an emulator for LaserDisc-based games, can emulate both the original and 1991 versions. It requires the ROM files plus the original LaserDisc to run. Alternatively, an MPEG-2 video stream and Ogg Vorbis audio stream can be substituted for the LaserDisc. These streams can be generated from the original LaserDisc or from Digital Leisure's DVD.

As with Dragon's Lair, a comic book miniseries incorporating elements from both the game and its Saturday Supercade version (such as Ace randomly changing into Dexter and back, instead of "energizing" back into Ace) was released in 2003 by Crossgen Publishing.

In the December 2003 issues of PSW (PlayStation World) and XBW (Xbox World), a free disk was given away with the magazine featuring Space Ace on one side (accompanied by trailers for similar games), and trailers for upcoming games on the other.

In May 2009, the game was made available on iOS.

In October 2010, Space Ace appeared on Wii as part of the Dragon's Lair Trilogy, which also features Dragon's Lair and Dragon's Lair II: Time Warp. It was later released as DSiWare in North America on December 6 and in the PAL region on December 31.

The PlayStation 3 port by Digital Leisure was released through the PlayStation Network on February 22, 2011.

An Android port of the game was released on December 28, 2012, via Google Play.

In August 2013, the game was made available through Steam.

In July 2015, Rebecca Heineman released the source code from a reverse engineered Apple IIGS version (dating back from 1990) on GitHub.

There is a compilation sold on the PlayStation Store also called Dragon's Lair Trilogy, which contains the original Dragon's Lair, Space Ace, and Dragon's Lair II: Time Warp as a set.

Space Ace appeared on Nintendo Switch as part of the Dragon's Lair Trilogy (a possible port of the Wii release), which also features Dragon's Lair and Dragon's Lair II: Time Warp in January 2019.

An NES version of Space Ace was developed, but never released.

In July 2022, Brutal Deluxe developed and released an improved version of the existing Space Ace port, as well a new port of Space Ace II: Borg's Revenge, for the Apple IIGS (the latter reportedly completed in 1991 by ReadySoft, but never released)

== Reception ==
Reviews (ports)

Review scores
Publication	Score
AllGame	4/5 (ARC); 2/5 (DVD Video); 2/5 (PC); 3.5/5 (MAC); 3/5 (Sega CD)
GamePro	3.9/5 (Sega CD)
Electronic Gaming Monthly	7.75/10 (CD-i)
Entertainment Weekly	B−
Next Generation	2/5 (MS-DOS); 2/5 (Sega CD)
CD-i	97% (CD-i)
Power Unlimited	91% (CD-i)

In the United Kingdom, it was the top-selling CD-i game in April 1994.

The four reviewers of Electronic Gaming Monthly gave the CD-i version a 7.75 out of 10. They described it as a "pixel perfect" conversion of the arcade game, though they criticized that the game lacks replay value.

In their review of the Sega CD version, GamePro gave the game an overall score of 3.9 out of 5, remarking that the game 'unfortunately highlights the color bleeding of the Sega CD', but praised the story, voicing, and music, and concluded "Space Ace is great for animation buffs or gamers who enjoyed Dragon's Lair". Next Generation gave the Sega CD version two out of five stars, criticizing the game's story as "juvenile" and the gameplay as 'overly limited': "The only way to beat any of the game's 13 stages is to play through it over and over until your reactions are automatic. You could surely train a monkey to do the same thing".

A reviewer for Next Generation gave the PC version two out of five stars, commenting that "Don Bluth's LaserDisc classic remains an entertaining cartoon attached to the antithesis of interactivity. ... Space Ace does manage to come out looking and sounding almost exactly like the original arcade adventure, but in the end, that's not necessarily a good thing".

Entertainment Weekly gave the game a B− and wrote that "Space Ace is part of a unique genre of CD games, the so-called decision point disc, in which, instead of controlling your character's every movement, you respond to specific threats. But Space Ace is a mixed blessing at best. It features terrific Don Bluth animation and an amusing plot involving the evil Commander Borf and his Infanto Ray. On the other hand, thanks to very tricky timing, it's such a frustrating experience you may want to turn the disc into a Frisbee". Power Unlimited reviewed the CD-i version and game, awarding it a score of 91%, summarizing: "In this eye-catching interactive cartoon you do not control a character, but the course of events. However, you have to be almost supernaturally fast, because you hardly have time to make a choice. Unique, but only suitable for speed freaks."

== Legacy ==
=== Sequel ===
Space Ace II: Borf's Revenge is a continuation of the home computer version of Space Ace, mostly featuring content that could not fit in available storage space on said version. It was released for Amiga, Atari ST, MS-DOS and Macintosh in 1991. An Apple IIGS port was also completed, but never released (detailed IIGS loading instructions appear in the manual for the other ports). A new Apple IIGS conversion was developed and released by Brutal Deluxe in 2022, based on the DOS version.

=== Other media ===
A short-lived cartoon series based on Space Ace was produced in 1984 as part of the Saturday Supercade cartoon block (which was composed of animated shorts based on then-current video games) with Ace voiced by Jim Piper, Dexter voiced by Sparky Marcus, Kimberly voiced by Nancy Cartwright, and Commander Borf voiced by Arthur Burghardt. Twelve Space Ace episodes were produced.

== See also ==
- List of LaserDisc games
