= Dragon's Lair =

Video game franchise

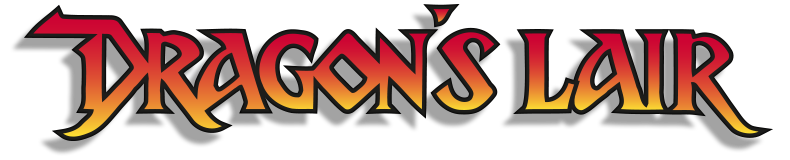
- Genres: Interactive film; Action-adventure
- Developers: RDI Video Systems; Software Projects; Motivetime; Elite Systems; Sullivan Bluth Studios; Dragonstone Software
- Publishers: Cinematronics; CSG Imagesoft; Leland Corporation; Data East; Ubisoft; Digital Leisure
- Creators: Rick Dyer; Don Bluth; Gary Goldman; John Pomeroy
- Platform: Arcade Adam Commodore 64 ZX Spectrum Amstrad CPC Amiga Atari ST Mac MS-DOS NES Game Boy SNES Sega CD 3DO CD-i Jaguar CD Windows Game Boy Color GameCube Xbox PlayStation 2 iOS Nintendo DS Wii PlayStation 3 PlayStation Portable Android Xbox 360 Linux TI-99/4A Apple IIGS
- First release: Dragon's Lair; July 1, 1983
- Latest release: Dragon's Lair 3D: Return to the Lair; November 18, 2002

Dragon's Lair is a video game franchise created by Rick Dyer. The series is notable for its film-quality animation by ex-Disney animator Don Bluth, and complex decades-long history of being ported to many platforms. It has also been adapted into television and comic books.

The first game in the series, Dragon's Lair, was originally released for arcades in 1983 by Cinematronics. It used LaserDisc technology, offering greatly superior graphics compared to other contemporary video games. While many home ports were released in the following years, developers often had to make severe compromises to make the game work on the target platforms of the era, such as splitting it into two halves. A sequel, Dragon's Lair II: Time Warp, had started development as early as 1984, but would only see release in arcades in 1991. While its graphics were once again praised, its limited interactivity compared to the newer generation of arcade games was considered outdated, and kept it from reaching the same popularity as the original.

The first two games in the series are considered gaming classics, and are frequently re-released on each new generation of consoles, often bundled alongside the 1984 LaserDisc game Space Ace.

The franchise has since expanded into other media, including a short-lived animated series that aired on ABC in 1984 and a comic-book miniseries released in 2003. Plans for a feature-length film have existed since the 1980s and resurfaced in 2015, when Bluth launched two crowd-funding campaigns. While the Kickstarter campaign was unsuccessful, the Indiegogo campaign reached its target in early 2016.

== Gameplay ==
Most games in the Dragon's Lair series are interactive films where the player controls Dirk the Daring, in a quest to save Princess Daphne. The game presents predetermined animated scenes, and the player must select a direction on the joystick or press the action button in order to clear each quick time event, with different full motion video segments showing the outcome. A perfect run of the 1983 arcade game with no deaths lasts no more than 12 minutes. In total, the game has 22 minutes or 50,000 frames of animated footage, including individual death scenes and game over screens.

== Characters ==
=== Dirk the Daring ===
Dirk the Daring
- Dragon's Lair character
- Dirk the Daring
- First appearance: Dragon's Lair (1983)
- Created by: Rick Dyer
- Designed by: Don Bluth
- Voiced by: Dan Molina (Dragon's Lair, Dragon's Lair II); Bob Sarlatte (television series)

Dirk the Daring is the main protagonist of the first game and subsequent franchise. As a knight of the kingdom, Dirk was entrusted with the rescue of Princess Daphne from Mordroc and Singe because all other knights were killed. He becomes heir to the throne upon saving Princess Daphne; following her rescue, Dirk and Daphne are married. In both games, Dirk is voiced by sound editor Dan Molina. Retro Gamer included Dirk on their list of top 50 game characters in the category "Top Ten Forces of Good" and called him "without a doubt, the epitome of the heroic knight".

=== Princess Daphne ===
Princess Daphne
- Dragon's Lair character
- Princess Daphne
- First appearance: Dragon's Lair (1983)
- Created by: Rick Dyer
- Designed by: Don Bluth
- Voiced by: Vera Lanpher (Dragon's Lair, Dragon's Lair II); Ellen Gerstell (television series); Darcy Harvier (Dragon's Lair 3D)

In the games, Princess Daphne is the beautiful daughter of King Aethelred and an unnamed queen. She serves as the series' damsel in distress. A beautiful maiden coveted by many princes and knights, her heart belongs to the kingdom's champion, Dirk the Daring.

==== Design and portrayal ====
Princess Daphne was originally created by Rick Dyer's Advanced Microcomputer Systems (AMS, later RDI Video Systems) team, then completely redesigned by the ex-Disney artist and animator Don Bluth. Bluth took his inspiration from photographs from the producer Gary Goldman's collection of old issues of Playboy magazine, ultimately putting Daphne "in a very-revealing one-piece 'thong' bathing suit with a sheer veil that partially covered her". Due to the limited budget's constraints, Daphne's in-game vocals were supplied by the head of AMS' Clean-up Department, Vera Lanpher.

For Dragon's Lair II, where Daphne has experienced more than a dozen births, Bluth said "he thought it would be interesting if Daphne looked just as beautiful as ever; there's absolutely no sign she's been through anything". Professional voice actress Ellen Gerstell voiced the character in the cartoon, wherein her attire is a less-revealing dress.

==== Reception ====
Princess Daphne was met with mostly positive reception and greatly contributed to the success of the game, which was then ported to various home platforms and followed by several sequels, remakes and spin-offs. She has been cited by multiple publications as one of the most attractive characters in video game history. UGO included her on their 2010 list of top 50 "video game hotties": "When the game was released, Daphne was the best-looking video game heroine around, so we still have a bit of a soft spot for her today". Including her at the 14th place on a similar list in 2012, Larry Hester of Complex opined Daphne "might be the finest damsel in distress ever. Sorry, Peach, Disney-style cel animation wins again".

Back in 1983, JoyStik's Joe Mendsky wrote "Daphne may look like the closest thing to a porn star in the annals of the video game, but she's not dumb. She's seen the line of quarters across the floor at the Denver arcade". Nearly three decades later, Complex said of her that there has "only ever really been one reason to play Dragon's Lair", and stated: "Never mind that the gameplay was nothing more than a quarter-sucking game of trial-and-error and memorization. And, oh, God: Princess Daphne and her little sheer black dress. Jesus Christ. She was way too sexy. Our little brains exploded". Ranking her as the 14th "hottest video game girl of all time" in 2013, Steve Jenkins of CheatCodes.com wrote: "Don Bluth's animated portrayal of Daphne, the princess who just can't seem to keep out of trouble, was the real attraction in this game… and attractive she was. (...) Princess Daphne's love of shear(sic!) clothing, plunging necklines, and her eternal 'damsel in distress' neediness made 50 cents a bargain to spend some quality time with her". Writing about the reason Dragon's Lair became so popular, Nikola Suprak of Hardcore Gamer stated: "Years of playing video games has made me very familiar with the 'save the princess' motif, which makes me extremely suspicious about Daphne's princess credentials. There is a far greater chance that she is just a stripper with the stage name Princess than an actual princess, because if actual princesses dressed like she did the royal weddings wouldn't be so boring to watch".

Jon M. Gibson of GameSpy called Daphne "the epitome of a damsel in distress". Rob Mead of ST Format wrote "Daphne has to be the dippiest woman on the planet. She's gone and got herself kidnapped again. Can you believe it? The woman is a victim. She might as well walk around with the words 'Kidnap me' tattooed on her forehead". Charlie Barratt of GamesRadar included her among the seven "damsels you DON'T want to save", arguing that "underneath the skimpy leotard and fluttering eyelashes, Daphne's no deeper than a cardboard cutout. No smarter than a blow-up doll bimbo. Nothing more than salacious and cynical bait for your hard-earned quarters (and Dragon's Lair swallowed a LOT of quarters)". Glamour model Tara Babcock ranked the "beyond beautiful" Daphne as the 16th "hottest video game" and wrote that "her half-naked, yet regal appearance, flowing blonde hair, big eyes with batting lashes and cute, ditzy appearance ... has been the subject of much controversy over 'sexism' in gaming!"

Daphne's voice was described by Earl Green of Classic Gamer Magazine as "a high pitched voice that could cause harm to small pets". Green also wrote that "those of us who were entering adolescence at the time never quite forgave the TV show for covering Princess Daphne up, even though a vast improvement was made in giving her more personality and more intelligence, rather than the original game's helium-voiced ditzy blonde". Reviewing Dragon's Lair 3D in 2002, GameSpot's Ryan Davis wrote Daphne "sounds just as squeaky and ditzy as she did in 1983". Kristan Reed of Eurogamer wrote it "remains as simultaneously amusing and irritating as ever".

=== Singe ===
Singe is a dragon who kidnaps Daphne.

== Games ==
Release timeline
1983	Dragon's Lair
1984–1986
1987	Escape from Singe's Castle
1988–1989
1990	Dragon's Lair (NES)
1991	Dragon's Lair: The Legend
1991	Dragon's Lair II: Time Warp
1992	Dragon's Lair III: The Curse of Mordread
1992	Dragon's Lair (SNES)
1993	Franky, Joe & Dirk: On the Tiles
1994–2001
2002	Dragon's Lair 3D: Return to the Lair

=== Main series ===
- Dragon's Lair is a 1983 LaserDisc video game developed by Advanced Microcomputer Systems. The game follows protagonist Dirk the Daring, a knight attempting to rescue Princess Daphne from the evil Singe the Dragon, who has imprisoned the princess in Mordroc's castle. While most other contemporary games were rendered with sprites or vector graphics, Dragon's Lair had its graphics streamed from a LaserDisc in real-time, with animation created by ex-Disney animator Don Bluth. This however imposed limitations on gameplay, with the game boiling down to a sequence of quick time events. It was advertised as the meeting point of video games and animated films. It is currently one of only three video games (along with Pong and Pac-Man) in storage at the Smithsonian Institution in Washington, D.C.
  - Escape from Singe's Castle is a 1987 video game published by Software Projects for Amstrad CPC, Commodore 64, and ZX Spectrum. It was later released for Amiga, Atari ST, MS-DOS and Macintosh by ReadySoft in 1990 and 1991. The game is composed of levels from the arcade game that did not make it into original home conversions. An Apple IIGS version was released in 2022.
- Dragon's Lair II: Time Warp is a 1991 LaserDisc video game developed by Sullivan Bluth Interactive. The game once again follows Dirk the Daring attempting to save Princess Daphne, whom he is now married to, from the evil wizard Mordroc. Dirk travels through several dimensions and historical eras searching for Daphne, some inspired by classic stories and fairy tales, such as Alice in Wonderland and Sleeping Beauty.
  - Dragon's Lair III: The Curse of Mordread is a 1992 video game published by ReadySoft for Amiga, Atari ST, MS-DOS and Macintosh. The game is composed of levels from the arcade version of Time Warp that were not included in the original home conversions. Additionally, it features a newly produced "Blackbeard the Pirate" stage that was originally intended to be in the arcade game, but was never completed. An Apple IIGS version was released in 2022.
- Dragon's Lair 3D: Return to the Lair is a 2002 action-adventure game developed by Dragonstone Software for Microsoft Windows, Xbox, GameCube and PlayStation 2. It is a re-imagining of the original Dragon's Lair and follows a similar story, as Dirk must enter Mordroc's castle to rescue Princess Daphne from a dragon. The game features many of the characters and locations from the 1983 arcade game, along with new puzzles, rooms, and enemies. The game uses cel shading to mimic the distinctive style of the original. Don Bluth produced two new animated sequences for the opening and ending of the game. It received mixed reviews upon release.

=== Spin-offs ===
- Dragon's Lair is a 1990 platform game developed by MotiveTime and published by CSG Imagesoft in North America, Elite Systems in Europe and Epic/Sony Records in Japan for the Nintendo Entertainment System. Its plot is identical to that of the original arcade game.
- Dragon's Lair: The Legend is a 1991 platform game developed by Elite Systems and published by CSG Imagesoft in North America, Elite Software in Europe and Epic/Sony Records in Japan for the Game Boy. This game is actually a port of Elite's 1985 ZX Spectrum game Roller Coaster.
- Dragon's Lair is a 1992 platform game developed by MotiveTime and published by Data East in North America, Elite Systems in Europe and Konami in Japan for the Super Nintendo Entertainment System. Its plot is identical to that of the original arcade game.
- Franky, Joe & Dirk: On the Tiles is a 1993 puzzle game developed by Audio Visual Magic and published by Elite Systems, released exclusively in Europe. It is a sliding block puzzle game featuring characters from previous Elite-published games: Franky from Dr. Franken, Joe from Joe & Mac and Dirk the Daring from Dragon's Lair.

== Other media ==
=== TV series ===
The game led to the creation of a short-lived television cartoon series, Dragon's Lair by Ruby-Spears Productions, where Dirk the Daring is voiced by Bob Sarlatte and the unseen storyteller that narrates each episode is voiced by Clive Revill. Changes in the TV series include the originally nameless Dragon being given the name Singe (voiced by Arthur Burghardt), Princess Daphne (voiced by Ellen Gerstell) wears a long pink dress, and includes some exclusive characters like Princess Daphne's father King Ethelred (voiced by Fred Travalena), Dirk the Daring's horse Bertram (vocal effects provided by Peter Cullen), Dirk the Daring's squire Timothy (voiced by Michael Mish), and Dirk the Daring's rival Sir Hubert Blunt (voiced by Peter Cullen). Enemies include the Lizard King, the Phantom Knight, the Giddy Goons, and the Mudmen. Thirteen half-hour episodes were produced and aired on the ABC network from September 8, 1984, to April 27, 1985. It was last aired on the USA Cartoon Express between the late '80s and the early '90s. To keep the show in the spirit of the game, before each commercial break the storyteller asks what the viewer would do to solve the problem facing Dirk. After the commercial break, the outcomes of the various choices are shown before Dirk acts on the correct idea (with the occasional exception) to save the day. Don Bluth had no involvement in the TV series.

=== Comic books ===
A comic book miniseries based on the game, but incorporating elements from the cartoon series as well, like Dirk's horse Bertram, was released in 2003 by CrossGen, concurrent with a miniseries based on Space Ace. Arcana Studio published the entire comic book series in 2006, as there are three issues that were previously unpublished.

=== Film ===
In the 1980s, a film version of Dragon's Lair was planned, with Alan Dean Foster involved in shaping the story. The project fell apart due to low interest from other studios.

In 2015 and 2016, Bluth and Goldman crowdfunded US$731,172 for a 10-minute teaser for an animated feature-length Dragon's Lair prequel film, their first feature film since Titan A.E. Bluth and Goldman have announced that the film will provide more backstory for Dirk and Daphne and that Daphne will show that she is not a "blonde airhead".

In March 2020, a live action film adaptation was approved by Netflix after one year of negotiations. Ryan Reynolds was in talks for the lead role. Reynolds, Roy Lee, Trevor Engelson, Bluth, Goldman, and former Bluth collaborator John Pomeroy are producers, with Dan and Kevin Hageman as writers. In June 2025, it was reported that James Bobin is in talks to direct the film, with Reynolds no longer starring but remains attached as a producer.
