= Rick Dyer (video game designer) =

American video game designer and writer

- Born: United States
- Occupations: Video game designer, writer, realtor
- Years active: 1982–present
- Known for: Dragon's Lair

Rick Dyer is an American video game designer and writer best known for creating Dragon's Lair. He founded RDI Video Systems, the developer of Dragon's Lair, Space Ace, and also Thayer's Quest, which was a conversion kit for Dragon's Lair.

Dyer next designed the video games Kingdom: The Far Reaches and Kingdom II: Shadoan, the former being a remake of Thayer's Quest and the latter a new game based on it.

Dyer is also known for being the person responsible for RDI Video System's Halcyon gaming console, named after the 2001: A Space Odyssey AI 'HAL 9000'. He also appeared on multiple news networks for the technological advances the LaserDisc system offered between 1983 and 1985 as the figurehead for RDI systems. Despite the TV appearances and being branded as 'David' among videogame companies in a David and Goliath comparison, Rick Dyer Industries (RDI) Systems went out of business in 1985 and the console was never released. In the late 1980s, he designed a line of fitness equipment called Powercise. One of his last major successes in the gaming industry was the development of Time Traveler in 1991.

Rick Dyer became a realtor for Apple Tree Realty based in Julian, California.

== Works ==
Year	Name			
Year	Name	Director	Writer	Producer
1983	Dragon's Lair	No	Concept	Yes
1984	Space Ace	No	No	Yes
1984	Thayer's Quest a.k.a. Kingdom: The Far Reaches	Yes	Creator	Yes
1991	Time Traveler	No	Creator	No
1996	Kingdom II: Shadoan	Yes	Creator	Yes
