= Dragon's Lair II: Time Warp =

1990 video game

- Arcade flyer
- Developers: Sullivan Bluth Interactive; ReadySoft (Amiga, ST, PC)
- Publishers: Leland Corporation; Digital Leisure; ReadySoft (Amiga, ST, PC); EA (iOS)
- Designer: Don Bluth
- Series: Dragon's Lair
- Platforms: Arcade, CD-i, DVD, Blu-ray, iOS, PlayStation 3, Wii, DSiWare, Amiga, Atari ST, Apple IIGS, MS-DOS, Macintosh, Nintendo Switch
- Release: September 1991: Arcade September 1991 Amiga, ST, MS-DOS November 1990 CD-i; NA: 1994 Mac; NA: November 15, 1996 DSiWare; NA: December 20, 2010; EU: July 7, 2011 PlayStation 3; NA: June 1, 2011
- Genre: Interactive movie
- Modes: Single-player, multiplayer

Dragon's Lair II: Time Warp is a 1990 LaserDisc video game made by the Leland Corporation, and the first true sequel to Dragon's Lair. As with the original, it consists of an animated short film that requires the player to move the joystick or press a fire button at certain times in order to continue. It takes place years after the original Dragon's Lair. Dirk has married Daphne, and the marriage has produced many children. When Daphne is kidnapped by the evil wizard Mordroc in order to be forced into marriage, Dirk's children and his mother-in-law are clearly upset by the abduction of Daphne, and Dirk must once again save her.

Home ports were announced for the Saturn, CD-i, 3DO, and Jaguar CD. Only the CD-i version was released. The game was later ported to the Wii as part of the compilation release Dragon's Lair Trilogy. A PlayStation 3 port was released on June 1, 2011. A Nintendo Switch port of the Wii Dragon's Lair Trilogy compilation was released on January 17, 2019.

== Plot ==
Dirk the Daring must find and rescue Princess Daphne with the help of a well-spoken time machine. It seems that the time machine is (or has been) possessed by the brother of Mordroc, the foul wizard that has kidnapped Daphne. Dirk travels through several dimensions and historical eras searching for Daphne, some inspired by classic stories and Disney fairy tales such as Alice in Wonderland (1951) and Sleeping Beauty (1959), to prevent Mordroc from enslaving Daphne to his whim with the dreaded Death Ring. Voice actor Michael Rye reprises his role as the narrator in the attract sequence, as he did with Dragon's Lair and Space Ace:

Dragon's Lair: Time Warp. Spirited away to a wrinkle in time by the evil wizard Mordroc, Daphne will be forced to marry the wicked Mordroc unless Dirk can save her. Transported by a bumbling old time machine, Dirk begins the rescue mission. Do it for the children! Once the Casket of Doom has opened, Mordroc will place the Death Ring upon Daphne's finger in marriage, and she will be lost forever... in the Time Warp!

== Gameplay ==
Gameplay differs from the original in two important ways. First, it follows a linear sequence of events which flow one into the next, as opposed to the randomized sequences of rooms from the first game; "dying" in the sequel also forces the player to resume from a checkpoint in the level rather than starting a randomly different level as in the original. Second, golden treasures are scattered throughout the game; getting each treasure is required to reach the final scenes. If the player misses any, at the end of the game it loops back to the first treasure missed. Unlike in the first game, the actions the player must do are prompted by a brief flash of what Dirk should use or where he should go next. However, to retrieve a golden treasure, the player may need to make a move in a direction other than what is flashing. Some scenes are randomly mirrored from left to right on a replay, limiting the player's ability to rely on memorizing the input sequence and requiring close attention during repeat attempts.

== Development ==
Development began in 1983 after the success of the original Dragon's Lair, and finally reached arcades eight years later. An advertisement from Don Bluth Productions featuring completed animation from stage 3 in the game had aired on television in 1984. Creating the game's animation took three years. The game's budget was $2.3 million.

The Amiga, Atari ST, and MS-DOS versions were released in November 1990, and cost £44.95. An Apple IIGS version was also reportedly completed during the same period (IIGS-specific loading instructions and game features appear in the manual), but never released, unlike the other versions. In May 2022, a new Apple IIGS conversion was developed and released by Brutal Deluxe, based on the resources from the DOS version. The home computer versions by ReadySoft were developed over the course of about one year. In a January 1991 issue of British gaming magazine The One, David Foster was interviewed as the founder of ReadySoft and a programmer for the home computer versions of Dragon's Lair II. He said it spans six floppy disks, due to higher resolution imagery than previous LaserDisc games by the Bluth Group, such as Space Ace.

Due to the arcade version of Dragon's Lair II having been unreleased at this stage in development, the game's home computer versions were made using a VHS tape as a reference, instead of a LaserDisc. Foster said, "conversion is obviously easier with the LaserDisc as you can get a good quality freezeframe. We digitize a series of images from the LaserDisc, then we separate the foreground from the background, giving each element to the respective artists to touch up, which includes outlining all the characters ... when you're converting from a high-resolution LaserDisc to a lower resolution screen a lot of detail is lost, so a lot has to be put back in". The conversion is then edited to match the 16-color palette to that of the original footage, and compressed. He said "On average it takes about two hours of 68030 computer time to compress a single frame - that's thousands of computer hours in all. So we have four machines with 25Mhz processor speed working on it - two Great Valley Products '030s, a Commodore '030 board, and an Amiga 3000."

== Stages ==
- Stage 1: Singe's Castle – Dirk must escape his angry mother-in-law who is furious about Princess Daphne's kidnapping by Mordroc. He must flee from her while getting past several creatures and obstacles in Singe's old castle, including a ravenous snake wearing a tam o' shanter, in order to reach the time machine that will allow him to pursue Mordroc.
- Stage 2: Land Before Time – In prehistory, Mordroc takes a moment to taunt Dirk as he battles pterodactyls, a T-rex, and two bat-winged centaurs that carry Daphne away. As this happens, the tiny island they are on gradually crumbles into the sea.
- Stage 3: Dirk in Wonderland – In 1865, Dirk is materialized in Alice Liddell's house and goes through the looking-glass that hangs over the fireplace. While being dressed as Alice by enemy characters, he tumbles into Wonderland where he faces Tweedledum and Tweedledee, the Queen of Hearts, her army of playing card soldiers, the Mad Hatter and the March Hare, the Jabberwock and the Cheshire Cat.
- Stage 4: Garden of Eden – In the Garden of Eden, Dirk has to escape from guardian angels, the advances of Eve, two snakes (one wanting to eat Dirk and the other a smooth-talker), and finally, the ruin of Eden itself when Eve accidentally eats the forbidden apple.
- Stage 5: Beethoven's Creative Gust – In 1808, Dirk is shrunk to the size of a mouse in Ludwig van Beethoven's study, where he must avoid the composer's constant playing the piano with his hands, his wicked hungry cat, and the sheer chaos of his creative gust.
- Stage 6: Ancient Egypt – In Ancient Egypt, Dirk finds what appears to be Daphne (wrapped completely in linen bandages) but is actually Mordroc in disguise, leading Dirk on a wild goose chase as he explores an ancient tomb while narrowly avoiding poison gas, spiders, giant bats, corrosive acid, scarabs, and a giant mummy.
- Stage 7: The Ring – At his castle, Mordroc puts the Death Ring on Daphne's finger, which transforms her into a monstrous banshee. Dirk must avoid the monstrous Daphne's mindless attempts to devour him. He must get the ring off her finger, restore her to normal, and defeat Mordroc at the same time. In addition to the alternate scene in the non-arcade version, Dirk has to remove the ring from Daphne and throw it at Mordroc.
- Stage 8: Daphne Awakens – Although Mordroc is defeated, Dirk must fight off Mordroc's last surviving minions, who are trying to get their revenge on him for defeating their master, so that Dirk safely escapes the crumbling castle with Daphne.

During the course of the game, the player must find and collect "treasures" in order to reach Mordroc. In the Director's Cut version of the game, gathering all the treasures offers an alternate, shorter and easier second-to-last stage. In it, Dirk must get the Death Ring and then throw it at Mordroc. This also includes three death scenes that were not used in the final release.

== Release ==
=== Home computers ===
Around the time the arcade version was out, an abridged version was released for the Amiga home computers by ReadySoft. It included only some of the scenes and most stages were absent altogether. It included the introduction reaching the machine, followed by the prehistoric stage, the Garden of Eden, and the final stage.

The game was followed by Dragon's Lair III: The Curse of Mordread also by ReadySoft. It presented an original storyline with Mordroc's sister, the evil witch "Mordread". She arrives at Dirk's and Daphne's home, and absorbing both the house and Daphne into an orb. This game incorporated the stages of Wonderland and Beethoven's piano from Time Warp but also included some original sequences: an intro, a stage on a pirate ship, a stage in the time realm, and an original ending.

Dragon's Lair II was released on DVD in 1998.

Following the release of Dragon's Lair and Space Ace in high-definition for Blu-ray, Digital Leisure released a Blu-ray version of Dragon's Lair II on June 2, 2009.

Dragon's Lair II was released on the PlayStation 3 on June 1, 2011.

A compilation titled Dragon's Lair Trilogy includes Dragon's Lair, Dragon's Lair II: Time Warp, and Space Ace. It has been released for both the Wii and Nintendo Switch.

== Reception ==
Reception

Review scores
| Publication | Score |
|---|---|
| AllGame | 2/5 (Arcade); 1.5/5 (DVD Video); 3.5/5 (PC); 1.5/5 (Xbox) |
| Amiga Action | 60% |
| Amiga Format | 65% |
| Amiga User International | 60% |
| Computer and Video Games | 4.2/10 |
| Electronic Gaming Monthly | 7.25 (CD-i) |
| CD-i | 81% |
| Power Unlimited | 81% (CD-i) |

In the United States, it was the top-grossing new video game on the RePlay arcade charts in October 1991.

The four reviewers of Electronic Gaming Monthly gave the CD-i version of Dragon's Lair II a 7.25 out of 10, commenting that it looks and plays just as good as the arcade version, and praising the addition of collectable items. One of the reviewers dissented with the majority opinion, saying that FMV games had lost their novelty and that the game was lacking in interaction. GamePro gave it a rave review. They applauded the sharp and colorful graphics, absence of slowdown, high frame rate, realistic sound effects, and outstanding controls, elaborating that "The CD-i's circular directional pad gives you quicker, more accurate button presses that help you get past every snake, dragon, and mother-in-law in sight." CD-i Magazine praised the game's Disney quality animation and sound. They commented that though as with all "interactive cartoons", the gameplay is very basic, there are more action-packed moments compared to its predecessor, and the graphics are among the best in its genre. They concluded, "DL2 is far from perfect, but it is a great improvement on the original." Power Unlimited reviewed the CD-i version and gave a score of 81% writing: "Incredibly fast interactive cartoon with beautiful images. Here, too, you do not control a game character, but rather the course of the story. Incidentally, the controls have been greatly improved compared to the previous part."

== See also ==
- List of LaserDisc games
