= Donnelly (surname) =

Donnelly is an Irish surname. Also used as: O’Donnelly or Donley. It is derived from the Gaelic Ó Donnghaile meaning 'descendant of Donnghal', a given name composed of the elements donn ('dark, brown') and gal ('valour'). O'Donnelly was historically of the Northern Uí Néill's Cenél nEoghain, descended from Donnghal, the great-grandson of Domhnall, King of Ailech.

It is most commonly found in Ulster, especially in County Tyrone and in parts of County Donegal. Donnelly is also prevalent in Connacht, particularly in County Galway.

The stronghold of the O'Donnelly family sept was Castlecaulfield was formerly known as Ballydonnelly (Irish: Baile Uí Dhonnaíle, meaning 'town or territory of O'Donnelly') a village in the south-east of County Tyrone in Northern Ireland.

Castle Caulfield, located in Castlecaulfield

== Origins ==
The Donnellys (O’Donnellys) held the role of marshalls to the O'Neills of Tyrone. According to Gaelic Irish tradition, the Donnellys were part of the Cenél nEoghain making them kin of the O'Neills.

In their role as Marshalls to the O'Neills, they were responsible for fostering the children of 'The O'Neill'.

The Donnellys reached the height of their role during the time of Shane O'Neill when Dean Terrence Danyell (Turlough O'Donnelly) of Armagh played a key role in communications between Shane O'Neill and Elizabeth I.

== Ballydonnelly ==
The earliest mention of Ballydonnelly is the Annals of the Four Masters in 1531 when it is said Baile-Ui-Donnghaile was assaulted by Niall Oge, son of Art, son of Con O'Neill. He demolished the castle; and he made a prisoner of the son of O'Neill, who was foster-son of Donnelly, and carried him off, together with the horses and the other spoils of the town.

At the start of the Plantation of Ulster, Ballydonnelly was allocated as a 'Servitor' portion and as such was granted to Sir Toby Caulfeild who had served in the Crown forces during the Nine Years' War. The Donnellys were involved in the 1641 rebellion where Castle Caulfield, was badly damaged by fire.

== Notable Donnellys ==
- Alan Donnelly (born 1957), British politician and former trade unionist
- Arthur Barrett Donnelly (1875–1919), US Army general
- Arthur Donnelly (1890–1954), New Zealand lawyer, sports administrator, and chairman of the Bank of New Zealand
- Brendan Donnelly (born 1950), British politician
- Brendan Donnelly (born 1971), baseball player
- Brian Donnelly (disambiguation)
- Charles Donnelly (disambiguation)
- Charley Donnelly (1885–1967), American educator, golfer, and football and golf coach
- Christine Donnelly, founder and CEO of the Aboriginal Dance Theatre Redfern in Sydney, Australia
- Ciaran Donnelly (footballer) (born 1984), English footballer
- Dan Donnelly (disambiguation)
- Danny Donnelly (politician), Northern Irish politician
- Davis A. Donnelly (1927–2020), Wisconsin senator
- Declan Donnelly (born 1975), English television presenter, producer and actor, one half of Ant & Dec
- Desmond Donnelly (1920–1974), British politician, author and journalist
- Dick Donnelly (1941–2016), Scottish football player, journalist and broadcaster
- Donal Donnelly (1931–2010), Irish theatre and film actor
- Dougie Donnelly (born 1953), Scottish television presenter
- Edward Terence Donnelly (1871–1929), US Army general
- Elfie Donnelly (born 1950), British-Austrian children books writer
- Eoghan Ó Donnghaile (Fl. c. 1690) Irish poet, took part in the controversy involving the Red Hand of Ulster
- Fin Donnelly (born 1966), Canadian politician
- Gary Donnelly (born 1962), American tennis player
- Gary Donnelly, Irish republican
- Giselle Donnelly (born 1953), American writer and director of the Center for Defense Studies at the American Enterprise Institute
- Greg Donnelly, Australian politician
- Henry Edmund Donnelly (1904–1967), American Catholic bishop
- Ian Donnelly (born 1981), Australian rugby league footballer
- Ignatius L. Donnelly (1831–1901), Minnesota politician
- Jack Donnelly (born 1985), English actor
- James Donnelly (disambiguation) (also people named Jim and Jimmy)
- Jamie Donnelly (born 1947), American actress
- Jason Donnelly (born 1970), New Zealand rugby league footballer
- Jennifer Donnelly (born 1963), American novelist
- Joe Donnelly (born 1955), American attorney and politician
- John Donnelly (disambiguation)
- Joseph Francis Donnelly (1909–1977), American Catholic bishop
- Ken Donnelly (born 1950–2017), American politician
- Kieran Donnelly, Irish Gaelic footballer
- Liza Donnelly, American cartoonist and writer
- Luke Donnelly (born 1996), Scottish footballer
- Laura Donnelly (born 1982), Irish actress
- Meg Donnelly (born 2000), American singer and actress
- Malcolm Donnelly (born 1943), Australian baritone singer
- Mark Donnelly (born 1955), Professor, Publisher, Author
- Martin Donnelly (disambiguation)
- Mattie Donnelly, Irish Gaelic footballer
- Mattie Donnelly, Irish hurler
- Melinda Romero Donnelly (born 1971), Puerto Rico politician
- Michael Donnelly (1927–1982), Roman Catholic priest from Ireland
- Michael Donnelly (1959–2005), Gulf War veteran, activist, and author
- Mike Donnelly (born 1963), American hockey player
- Patrick Donnelly (disambiguation)
- Peter Donnelly (born 1959), Australian mathematician
- Peter F. Donnelly (1938–2009), American patron of the arts
- Phil M. Donnelly (1891–1961), Missouri governor 1945-49 and 1953–57
- Rich Donnelly (born 1946), American baseball coach
- Ruth Donnelly (1896–1982), American stage and film actress
- Ryann Donnelly, American musician
- Samuel Donnelly (born 2010), professional sim racer
- Scott Donnelly (footballer) (born 1987), English football player
- Scott C. Donnelly (born 1961), Chief Operating Officer of Textron
- Seamus Donnelly (disambiguation)
- Shannon Donnelly, Children's novelist
- Sharon Donnelly (born 1967), Canadian athlete
- Simon Donnelly (born 1971), Scottish footballer
- Sinéad Donnelly, Irish professor of palliative medicine
- Tanya Donelly (born 1966), American musician
- Tara Donnelly (born 1998), Irish Gymnast
- Thomas Donnelly (Saskatchewan politician) (Thomas F. Donnelly, 1874–1948), Canadian member of Parliament
- Thomas Donnelly (sergeant-at-arms) (1764–1835), New York legislative officer
- Thomas Charles Donnelly (1933–1997), former Alberta MLA
- Thomas Dean Donnelly, American screenwriter
- Thomas F. Donnelly (New York City) (1863–1924), New York politician and judge
- Tim Donnelly (disambiguation)
- Tom Donnelly (rugby union) (Thomas Mathew Donnelly, born 1981), New Zealand rugby union player
- Tom Donnelly (Scottish footballer) (born 1947), Scottish footballer for Motherwell and East Stirlingshire
- Tommy Donnelly (footballer), Irish association football player
- William Donnelly (disambiguation)
- The Black Donnellys, a feuding Canadian family

== Fictional people ==
- Elizabeth Donnelly, character in American crime drama, Law & Order: Special Victims Unit
- Glen Donnelly, character from Australian soap opera, Neighbours
- Helen Elliott Donnelly, character in American soap opera, Love is a Many Splendored Thin

== See also ==
- Donnally
- Donnellan
- O'Neill dynasty
- Cenel nEoghain
- List of Irish clans
