= Controversies in the 2011 Canadian federal election =

This article lists some of the controversies in the 2011 Canadian federal election.

- In February 2012 a Conservative Party of Canada staffer resigned among widespread calls of election fraud. This fraud involved both live and robocalls in 39 ridings and were linked to the Conservative government. These calls were aimed at opposition party voters directing them to incorrect or non-existent polling stations. Several employees of a call center have come forward to claiming to have received directions to misinform voters from the Conservatives. Prime Minister Stephen Harper and his government have denied any knowledge of the incidents. RCMP and Elections Canada are investigating these claims.
- In Vaughan, Deputy Defence Minister and former police chief Julian Fantino has been accused of holding a second bank account for the election, in contravention of electoral law.
- In Eglinton—Lawrence, 2,700 voters with fraudulent or no addresses voted in the election.
- Raymond Sturgeon, the Conservative candidate for Algoma—Manitoulin—Kapuskasing, was until December 2010 a lobbyist for Lockheed Martin Aeronautics, the manufacturer of the Lockheed Martin F-35 Lightning II fighter plane, which the Canadian government agreed to purchase in July 2010.
- A former Conservative Party staffer who is under investigation by the Royal Canadian Mounted Police, Sebastien Togneri, was found to be volunteering for Edmonton—Strathcona Conservative candidate Ryan Hastman. After news of this was released by The Canadian Press, he was removed from the campaign, although his mere involvement in political affairs was criticized by opposition leaders.
- Yvon Lévesque, the Bloc Québécois MP for Abitibi—Baie-James—Nunavik—Eeyou, was quoted as saying that "Certain voters will not choose the New Democratic Party now that they're running an aboriginal candidate." He was referring to New Democratic Party (NDP) candidate Roméo Saganash, who won the election.
- Cheryl Gallant, the Conservative candidate for Renfrew—Nipissing—Pembroke, compared Liberal leader Michael Ignatieff to Libyan dictator Muammar Gaddafi. She later apologized.
- On March 18, Mark Strahl (son of incumbent Conservative MP Chuck Strahl) was nominated as the candidate in his father's riding of Chilliwack—Fraser Canyon. The nomination process, which usually takes four weeks, lasted only a week. During the nomination Mark Strahl was endorsed by former Reform leader Preston Manning, who said "Mark Strahl—by virtue of his family background … is well prepared for service in the House of Commons." This was criticized by members of the Conservative party: former Chilliwack city council Casey Langbroek said most Conservative party members from the riding were upset, and Alex Moens said "High public office should not be like a family business, where it's passed on from father to son."
- At a tightly controlled event aimed at immigrant communities in Brampton, Ontario, Harper used the phrase "you people" to attendees. Ignatieff and NDP leader Jack Layton immediately criticized Harper and pointed to his record of reducing family reunification quotas for immigration and criminal justice policies that allegedly disadvantage non-white populations.
- Two veterans, including Jim Lowther of the Veterans Emergency Transition Team were not permitted to enter a Harper Halifax news conference nor even watch his speech.
- During a Conservative rally in London, Ontario, an RCMP officer asked two students to leave the event for having supposed ties to the Liberal Party. One of the students later complained that the only reason she could think of for being removed was the fact she had a Facebook profile photo showing her posing for a picture with Michael Ignatieff, after having previously attended an NDP and Liberal rally. Both Ignatieff and Jack Layton immediately criticized their forced removal.
- On April 6, André Forbes, the Liberal candidate for the rural Quebec riding of Manicouagan, was criticized by the NDP for calling First Nations and Inuit "featherheads," as well as being the founder of the white supremacist group l'Association des Droits des Blancs (literally the Association for White Rights), despite being Métis himself. Liberal leader Michael Ignatieff stated that he was "shocked" by the Forbes comments and that "if he really said that, it's not possible to remain a candidate for the Liberal Party of Canada." Later the same day, Ignatieff announced that Forbes was no longer the Liberal candidate for Manicouagan. While Forbes remained on the ballot as a Liberal, he would not have been allowed to sit with the Liberal caucus had he won.
- Liberal Party leader Michael Ignatieff's wife, Zsuzsanna Zsohar, came under attack from conservative lobby group National Citizens Coalition president Peter Coleman over the fact that she is not yet a Canadian citizen, and will therefore be unable to vote for her husband on May 2. Zsohar explained in the interview that she, like any other immigrant arriving in Canada, was waiting in line for her Citizenship application to be accepted and that the campaign was not about her.
- The Conservative Party came under heavy fire on April 11 when a draft report for the G8 summit was leaked to the Canadian Press, which indicated that the Tories misled the Parliament of Canada to seek approval for $50 million tax dollars to be spread on dubious projects, which over half of it was spent on the riding of Parry Sound-Muskoka, Industry Minister Tony Clement's riding. It prompted calls from the other leaders to release the report immediately, but the Auditor General of Canada, Sheila Fraser, told reporters the rules forbid her to release it because she has to release it to the Speaker of the House of Commons.
- A Green Party candidate, Alan Saldanha, resigned after making a rape comment on Facebook. Saldanha, running for a seat in British Columbia's Fleetwood—Port Kells riding, has since removed the comment.
- Two Conservative riding association members (Richard Lorello and Tracey Kent) quit their own riding association in Vaughan after money was earmarked for the Vaughan Health Campus of Care (VHCC), which has two key fund-raisers for incumbent Tory candidate Julian Fantino as backers. Liberal leader Michael Ignatieff responded to the incident, saying that "it doesn't sit well, it doesn't look right, it doesn't feel right and Conservatives themselves are embarrassed by it."
- Canadian Arab Federation president Khaled Mouamar received an email from Etobicoke Centre Conservative campaign staffer Zeljko Zidaric asking him if he had any groups that would like to participate in a Conservative rally "by having someone at the event in an ethnic costume". The email further elaborated that they wanted them for a "photo-op about all the multicultural groups that support Ted Opitz our local Conservative candidate and the Prime Minister." Mouamar took offence to the email. A counter rally was made to protest the email.
- Conservative candidate Gavan Paranchothy (previously known as Ragavan Paranchothy), who is running in the riding of Scarborough Southwest, has in the past praised the Tamil Tiger movement, including hosting a televised tribute to the Tamil Tigers in November 2010. When questioned about the candidate Conservative leader Stephen Harper simply stated that his party has "taken a strong position against the Tamil Tigers", but did not comment specifically about the candidate.
- One-term Penticton city councillor Dan Albas was nominated as the Conservative Party candidate in Okanagan—Coquihalla, the riding of Stockwell Day, the former Canadian Alliance leader and president of the Treasury Board. The nomination process lasted only a week, causing at least five prospective candidates not to make the nomination deadline. Albas and the two other candidates who managed to file their paperwork in time were both close associates of Stockwell Day and are alleged to have had prior notification of Day's surprise resignation. The process was criticized by members of the Conservative party including Day's fundraising chair, who says he ripped up his Conservative Party membership card. One of the candidates who missed the deadline, party veteran Sean Upshaw, ran as an 'independent conservative' candidate in the riding.
- The Conservative Party alleged that a special ballot held at the University of Guelph on April 13, 2011 could in fact be illegal under the Canada Elections Act, claiming that partisan election material was present. Elections Canada, who are responsible for enforcing the act, responded that the ballots were legal. The action by the Conservatives, especially after allegations that a party volunteer attempted to grab the ballot box in an attempt to halt the voting, was criticized by the opposition parties, who accused the Conservatives of discouraging youth from voting.
- Conservative candidate Wally Daudrich had posted on his Facebook page that Barack Obama was the "worst president that America has ever had" as well as "the biggest lying president America has ever had". His comments were primarily motivated by the candidate's stance on abortion, with him being against certain aspects of the President's health-care reform bill. After his post became widely publicized he deleted the comment. Conservative leader Stephen Harper refused to admonish the candidate, stating instead that he and Obama "have a very good working relationship".
- Brad Trost, the Conservative incumbent for Saskatoon—Humboldt, spoke at a Saskatchewan Pro-life Association convention and told the audience that the government had denied funding to Planned Parenthood. Prime Minister Stephen Harper did not comment on Trost's remarks, instead stating that the Conservative Party does not intend to reopen the abortion debate in Parliament.
- Conservative candidate Wai Young (Vancouver South) came under fire for being endorsed by the man acquitted in the Air India bombing, Ripudaman Singh Malik, Young said she had no idea that Malik was involved with the Khalsa School.
- Conservatives condemned a Liberal television ad which wrongly quoted Harper saying he would scrap the Canada Health Act. This was actually a quote from a National Citizens Coalition colleague of Harper's. The Liberals replaced the quote, which they had found misattributed to Harper in a Globe and Mail story, with another one of Harper's statements about health care that they said delivered the same message.
- Michael Ignatieff criticized Conservative candidates for not attending local debates. Later Ignatieff said that he would not attend the debates in his riding of Etobicoke—Lakeshore because of his duties to campaign nationally as party leader. Stephen Harper also planned not to be attending any debates in his riding, Calgary Southwest, because he would be campaigning nationally.
- A Liberal campaign volunteer for Joe Volpe in Eglinton—Lawrence was caught on camera removing Green Party pamphlets from mailboxes, throwing them away, and replacing them with Liberal campaign materials, as Volpe looked on. Tampering with mail is a criminal offence in Canada. Volpe has since fired the worker, but only after being caught on camera standing next to the worker as he committed these actions.
- On April 29, 2011, a retired police officer told the Sun News Network and the Toronto Sun newspaper that in 1996, Layton had been found naked in a massage parlour when police, looking for underage prostitutes, raided the establishment. The police informed Layton of the potentially questionable use of the business and recommended that he avoid it in the future. No charges were laid. The Sun later ran a follow-up piece, in which Toronto city councillor Giorgio Mammoliti criticized Layton. Layton has said there was no wrongdoing in the matter, saying that he simply "went for a massage at a community clinic" and did not return after the police advised him not to. He also referred to the release of the police report as a smear campaign against him. Bloc Québécois leader Gilles Duceppe has also dismissed the claim. A subsequent Toronto Star column stated that most contributors to online discussions agreed there was a smear campaign against Layton. As for political damage from this story, that same day's update of the Nanos Leadership Index, which assesses public opinion on the Canadian federal leaders' trustworthiness, competence and vision for Canada, Layton rose from 80% to 97%, surpassing Harper at 88% and Ignatieff 39%. The polling company speculated this improvement is due to strong sympathy by the public for a political candidate they judged as being unfairly maligned. Toronto Police have launched an investigation into how official police notes were leaked to Sun Media. Police notebooks are closely guarded and may contain unfounded and unproven allegations.
