= Alexander Bell Patterson =

Canadian politician

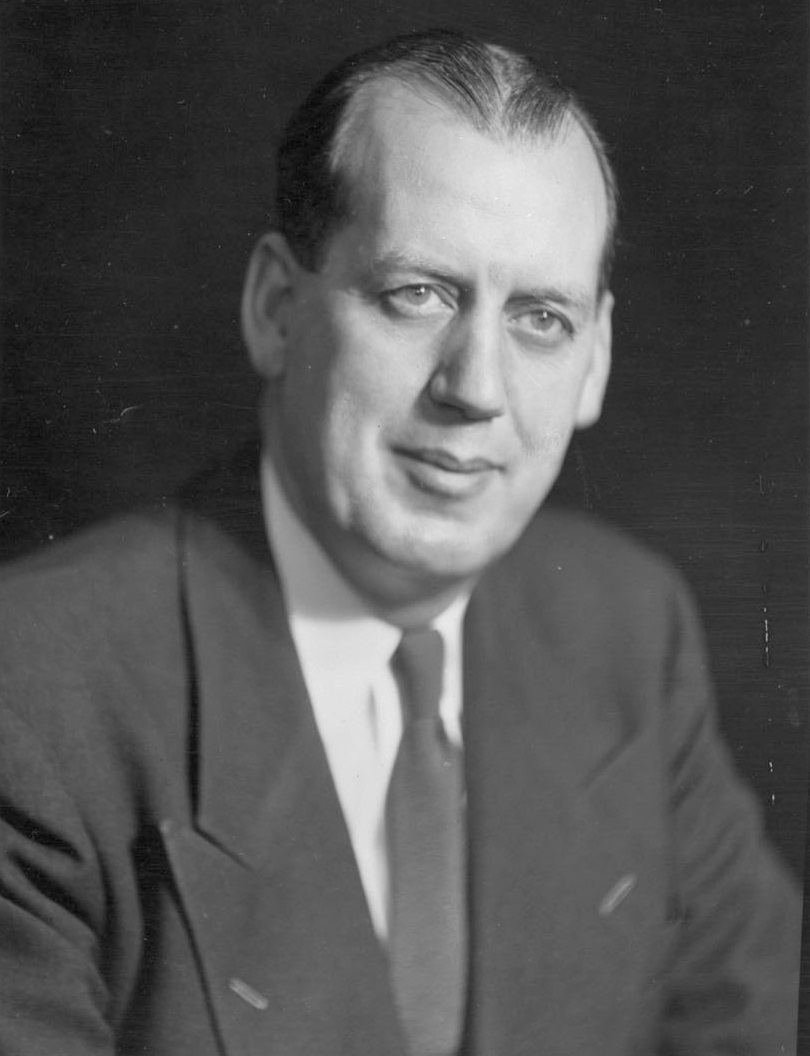

Leader of the Social Credit Party of Canada
- Acting
- In office March 1967 – June 1968
- Preceded by: Robert N. Thompson
- Succeeded by: Réal Caouette (1971)

Member of Parliament for Fraser Valley East
- In office October 30, 1972 – September 4, 1984
- Preceded by: Ervin Pringle
- Succeeded by: Ross Belsher

Member of Parliament for Fraser Valley
- In office June 18, 1962 – June 24, 1968
- Preceded by: William Harold Hicks
- Succeeded by: Riding abolished
- In office August 10, 1953 – March 31, 1958
- Preceded by: George Cruickshank
- Succeeded by: William Harold Hicks

Personal details
- Born: Alexander Bell Patterson; April 22, 1911; Raymore, Saskatchewan, Canada
- Died: April 2, 1993 (aged 81); Abbotsford, British Columbia, Canada
- Political party: Progressive Conservative (1972–1984); Independent (1971–1972); Social Credit (1953–1971)
- Spouse: Charlotte Nice
- Children: 4
- Profession: Clergyman

Alexander Bell Patterson (April 22, 1911 – April 2, 1993) was a long-time Canadian member of Parliament (MP) and was briefly leader of the Social Credit Party of Canada.

== Life and career ==
Bell was born in Raymore, Saskatchewan, the son of an Irish father, Robert Patterson, and a Scottish mother, Mary Bell, who immigrated to Canada in 1901. He grew up on the family's farm until moving to Portage la Prairie to work in a grocery store. Later he attended the Salvation Army Leadership Training School in Toronto. In 1938, he married Charlotte Nice, a Salvation Army officer from Neepawa, Manitoba. They raised four children.

From 1935 until 1953, he led churches in Saskatchewan, Alberta and British Columbia. In 1953, while minister of the Church of the Nazarene in Abbotsford, British Columbia, he was elected to House of Commons of Canada in the 1953 election from the riding of Fraser Valley, British Columbia. He was defeated in the 1958 election. He ran for the party leadership at the 1961 Social Credit leadership convention but withdrew before the first ballot.

Patterson returned to Parliament in 1962. He became acting leader of the Social Credit Party in 1967 when leader Robert N. Thompson resigned citing the party's lack of financial support from its BC and Alberta wings. Once the writs were dropped for the 1968 election, Thompson sought and won the Progressive Conservative Party of Canada nomination in his riding. Bud Olson had left the party a few months before joining the Liberal Party of Canada, leaving Patterson as the acting leader of the remaining three-person Social Credit caucus into the 1968 election in which all three MPs were defeated, including Patterson in Fraser Valley East.

Patterson returned to Parliament in the 1972 election representing Fraser Valley East as a Progressive Conservative, and was subsequently re-elected as a Tory until his retirement from politics in 1984.

Preceded by Robert N. Thompson	National Leaders of Social Credit; 1967–1968	Succeeded by Réal Caouette
