= Belsher =

Belsher is a surname. Notable people with the surname include:

- Jon L. Belsher (fl. 1998), American physician
- Ross Belsher (1933–2003), Canadian politician and businessman

== See also ==
- Merlis Belsher Place, an arena in Saskatchewan, Canada
