= John Donnelly =

John Donnelly may refer to:

- John Donnelly (Australian politician) (1885–1956), Australian politician
- John Donnelly (baseball) (1850–1913), American baseball player
- John Donnelly (footballer, born 1936) (1936–2009), Scottish footballer (Celtic, Preston North End)
- John Donnelly (footballer, born 1961), Scottish footballer (Motherwell, Leeds United)
- John Donnelly (hurler) (born 1998), Irish hurler in Kilkenny
- John Donnelly (ice hockey) (born 1948), Canadian ice hockey defenceman who played in the WHA with the Ottawa Nationals
- John Donnelly (Irish farmer), Irish farmer who was President of the Irish Farmers' Association, 1994–1998
- John Donnelly (rowing) (1905–1986), Canadian Olympic rower
- John Donnelly (rugby league) (1955–1986), Australian rugby league footballer
- John Donnelly (whaler) (1822–1904), New Zealand whaler and gold prospector
- John Aiden Donnelly (born 1952), Gardaí officer and recipient of the Scott Medal
- John C. Donnelly (1839–1895), American Civil War sailor and Medal of Honor recipient
- John H. Donnelly (1857–1926), American politician and government official
- John J. Donnelly (born 1952), Vice Admiral in the US Navy
- John P. Donnelly (1886–1949), American politician
- John Donnelly (playwright), author of Going Forward in 2020 UK drama series Unprecedented

== See also ==
- Joe Donnelly (born 1955), American attorney, diplomat and politician (senator from Indiana)
