= Meyronne, Saskatchewan =

Community in Saskatchewan, Canada

Meyronne
- Special service area
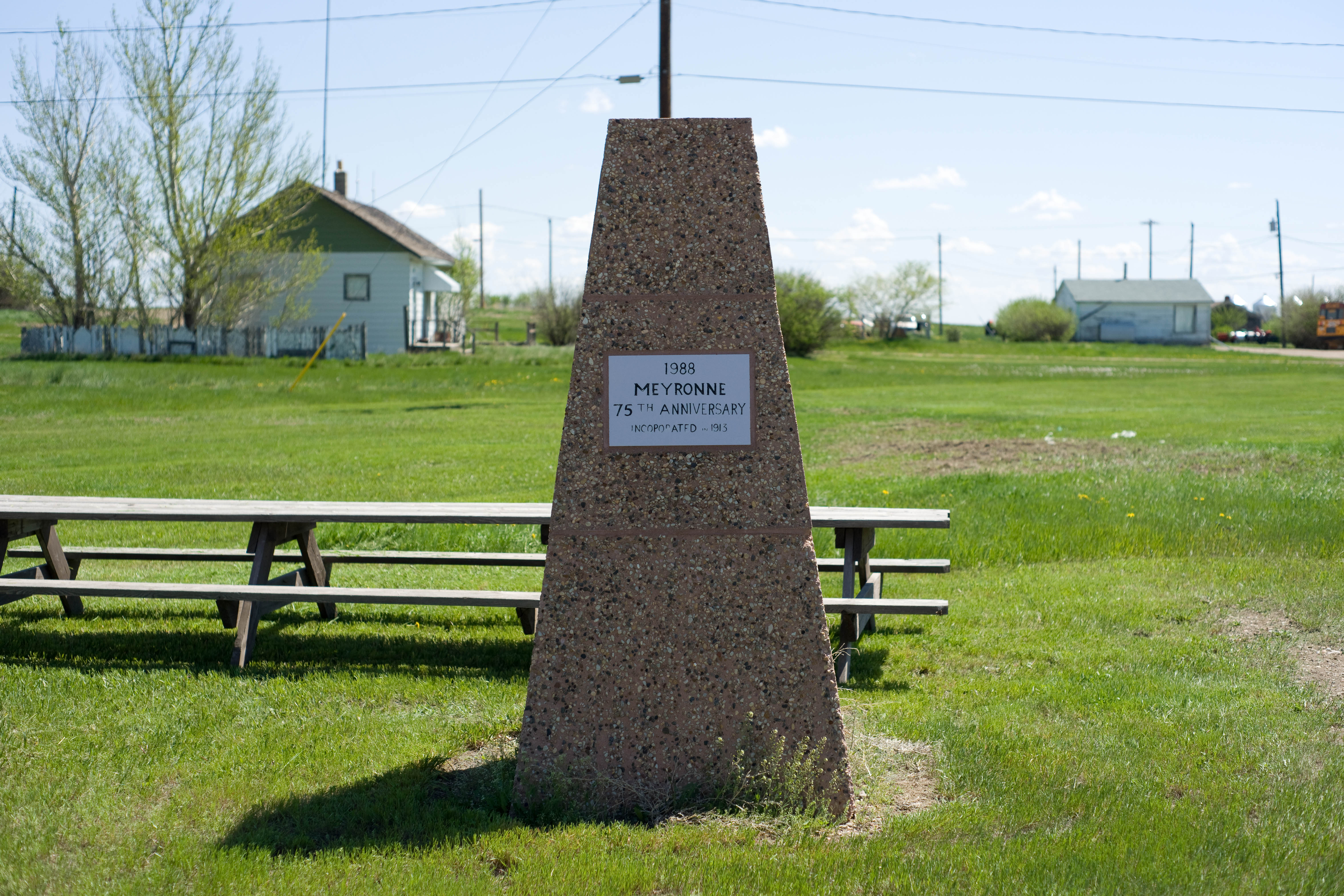
- Memorial commemorating Meyronne's 75th anniversary in 1988

- Location within Pinto Creek No. 75 Location within Saskatchewan
- Coordinates: 49.666°N 106.847°W
- Country: Canada
- Province: Saskatchewan
- Census division: 3
- Rural Municipality: Pinto Creek No. 75
- Post office founded: June 1, 1909
- Incorporated (village): N/A
- Restructured (special service area): September 5, 2006

Government
  - Governing body: RM Pinto Creek No. 75
  - Mayor: Laurie Schwab

Area
  - Total: 0.53 km^{2} (0.20 sq mi)

Population (2001)
  - Total: 35
  - Density: 65.5/km^{2} (170/sq mi)
- Time zone: CST
- Area code: 306
- Highways: Highway 13; Highway 611

Meyronne is a special service area in the Canadian province of Saskatchewan. It is situated along the course of Pinto Creek in the RM of Pinto Creek No. 75. Access is from Highway 611, about a mile south of Highway 13.

== History ==
Known history of the Wood Mountain area goes back to the March West by the NWMP in 1874 and the founding of the Wood Mountain Post that same year. Land in the area was opened for homesteading in 1908. When the railway went through in 1913, the settlement moved to its present site.

It was reorganised from a village into a special service area on September 5, 2006.

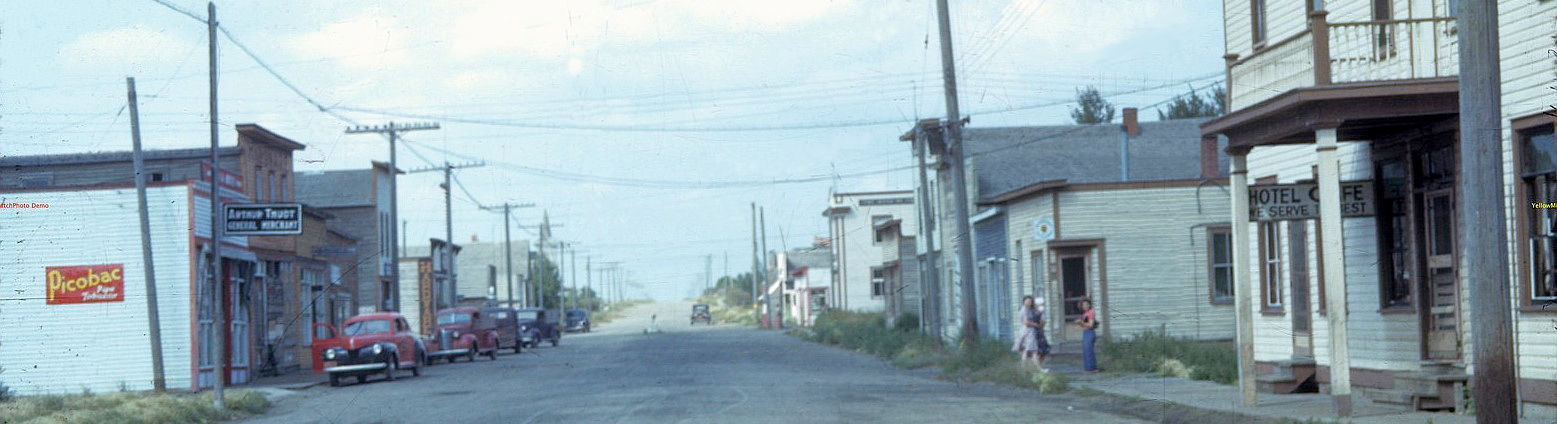
Meyronne, 1942

== Demographics ==
In the 2021 Census of Population conducted by Statistics Canada, Meyronne had a population of 20 living in 9 of its 13 total private dwellings, a change of −42.9% from its 2016 population of 35. With a land area of 0.41 km^{2} (0.16 sq mi), it had a population density of 48.8/km^{2} (126.3/sq mi) in 2021.

== Infrastructure ==
Saskatchewan Transportation Company used to provide intercity bus service to Meyronne before it was dismantled.

== See also ==
- List of communities in Saskatchewan
