= Shannon Donnelly =

American novelist

Shannon Donnelly (b. March 15 CA) is an author of children’s books, romance novels, video games, and non-fiction books.

Her work has repeatedly earned 4½ Star Top Pick reviews from Romantic Times magazine, as well as praise from Booklist and other reviewers, who note: "simply superb"..."wonderfully uplifting"... and "beautifully written."

In addition to her many published romance novels, Donnelly was an early pioneer in the field of interactive fiction, expressed in the form of video games and internet websites. Her writing and interactive design skills were instrumental in the creation of the 1983 Space Ace, a LaserDisc videogame created as a follow-up to the highly successful Dragon's Lair—which was also LaserDisc-based—on whose creating she had also been involved.

Next came Thayer's Quest, another LaserDisc medium but this time targeted at home using Halcyon (console) home game system created by RDI Video Systems.

Donnelly is a member of Los Angeles Romance Authors (LARA), Orange County Chapter (OCC) of RWA, Published Author Special Interest Chapter (PASIC). She regularly teaches online workshops, including a class for UCLA, and has spoken at RWA's National Conference, as well as at chapter meetings and other conferences.

== Awards and honors ==
Donnelly’s writing has won numerous awards, including finalist for Best Regency Romance in Romance Writers of America's RITA and RWA's Golden Heart. Other awards include the Grand Prize in the "Minute Maid Sensational Romance Writer" contest, judged by Nora Roberts, which gave her a trip to Paris, the Laurel Wreath and the Winter Rose, and multiple finalists in the Bookseller's Best, Orange Rose, Holt Medallion, Colorado ACE, Wisconsin Write Touch Award, Golden Quill, and Beacon contests.

== Books published ==
Lady Scandal ISBN 0-8217-7412-3 © July 2004 Romantic Times Top Pick - 4½ Stars Romantic Times Bookclub Nominated "Best Regency" 2004

Barely Proper ISBN 0-8217-7411-5 © December 2003

A Proper Mistress ISBN 0-8217-7410-7 © May 2003 Bookseller's Best Award Finalist, Golden Quill Finalist, Orange Rose Finalist Romantic Times Top Pick - 4½ Stars

Proper Conduct ISBN 0-8217-7106-X © December 2002 Winner Winter Rose Contest Finalist Blue Boa Contest

A Much Compromised Lady ISBN 0-8217-7105-1 © February 2002 Romantic Times Top Pick - 4½ Stars, Finalist Blue Boa Contest

Under the Kissing Bough ISBN 0-8217-6752-6 © November 2001 RITA Finalist, Best Regency Romance 2001, Winner Laurel Wreath Beacon Finalist, Golden Quill Finalist

A Dangerous Compromise ISBN 0-8217-6752-6 © June 2001 Award of Excellence Finalist, Holt Medallion Finalist, Laurel Wreath Finalist

A Compromising Situation ISBN 0-8217-6751-8 © October 2001 Golden Heart Winner, Holt Medallion Finalist, Award of Excellence Finalist, Beacon Finalist

Anthologies With this Ring ISBN 0-8217-7677-0 © June 2004 Romantic Times Top Pick - 4½ Stars

My Dashing Groom ISBN 0-8217-7260-0 © June 2002

My Sweet Valentine Anthology ISBN 0-8217-7184-1 © January 2002

Autumn Kittens Anthology ISBN 0-8217-7036-5 © September 2001

Young Adult Phantom of the Opera, (adaptation), Baronet Books

Go, Team, Go, Children's, Baronet Books

Bug Out, Children's, Baronet Books

Escape From Evil, Fright Time #13, Baronet Books

Terror-Go-Round, Fright Time #12, Baronet Books

It’s Really Me!, Fright Time #11, Baronet Books

After Shock, Fright Time # 8, Baronet Books

Something’s in the Sewer, Fright Time #5, Baronet Books

Night Creatures, Fright Time Series #6, Baronet Books
