= South West Terminal Ltd. =

Canadian grain handling and agricultural inputs company

- Trade name: SWT
- Industry: Agribusiness
- Founded: April 4, 1994
- Headquarters: Antelope, Saskatchewan, Canada
- Area served: Southwestern Saskatchewan and southern Alberta
- Key people: Monty Reich (CEO)
- Products: Grain handling, grain marketing, crop inputs, agronomy
- Website: swt.ca

South West Terminal Ltd. (SWT) is a Canadian producer-owned grain handling and agricultural inputs company based near Gull Lake, Saskatchewan. Established in 1994 by farmers from southwestern Saskatchewan, the company operates an inland grain terminal at Antelope, approximately 11 kilometres (6.8 mi) east of Gull Lake, along the Trans-Canada Highway and the Canadian Pacific Railway main line.

The company provides grain handling and marketing services, as well as fertilizer, crop protection, and agronomy services through locations in southwestern Saskatchewan and southern Alberta.

== History ==
=== Establishment and construction ===
South West Terminal originated in the early 1990s amid changes to the grain handling industry in western Canada. As grain companies closed smaller wooden elevators and consolidated operations into larger facilities, a group of producers in the Gull Lake area began exploring the development of an independently operated grain terminal.

In March 1994, The Western Producer reported that a group of approximately 20 farmers, led by Ernie Sommer, was seeking to establish a producer-owned terminal to provide an alternative to existing grain handling companies in southwestern Saskatchewan.

South West Terminal Ltd. was incorporated on April 4, 1994. The company subsequently raised capital through a local share offering and secured a partnership with Cargill. Construction of the terminal began in late 1995, at a reported cost of approximately $9 million. The facility received its first grain deliveries in January 1997.

=== Expansion ===
Following the opening of the Antelope terminal, SWT expanded into the agricultural inputs business. Its first crop inputs facility opened at the grain terminal site in 2000, followed by locations at Hazenmore in 2003, Cabri in 2009, Shaunavon in 2011, Wymark in 2016, and Kyle in 2019.

By 2013, SWT had expanded its grain storage capacity to approximately 53,000 tonnes. At that time, Cargill held a 44 percent non-voting ownership interest, while local investors controlled the company's voting shares and board of directors.

=== Rail transportation ===
On May 26, 2020, South West Terminal loaded a 224-car Canadian Pacific Railway grain train at its Antelope facility. Carrying approximately 22,223 tonnes of durum wheat to Thunder Bay, Ontario, the shipment was reported as the largest single-origin grain train moved on the Canadian Prairies by Canadian Pacific at that time.

=== Recent developments ===
In November 2025, SWT acquired a minority ownership interest in Independent Crop Inputs Inc. and entered into a joint venture to operate an agricultural retail and rail transloading facility at Whitla, Alberta.

In 2026, SWT acquired Solo Italia Fine Pasta Inc., a pasta and pizza manufacturer based in Ogema, Saskatchewan. The acquisition marked the company's expansion into value-added food manufacturing.

Later that year, SWT and Solo Italia announced plans to establish a commercial pasta production facility in Swift Current, Saskatchewan. The project received federal support for production equipment, facility renovations, and cold-storage infrastructure.

== Operations ==
South West Terminal operates the Antelope inland grain terminal near Gull Lake. The facility handles agricultural commodities including wheat, durum, canola, barley, flax, peas, and lentils. Its operations include grain cleaning, storage, railcar loading, and grain marketing.

The company is licensed by the Canadian Grain Commission as a grain dealer and primary elevator operator.
