= Pat Donnelly =

Pat Donnelly may refer to:

- Patrice Donnelly (born 1950), American track and field athlete who competed at the 1976 Summer Olympics
- Pat Donnelly (ice hockey, born 1942), Canadian ice hockey player
- Pat Donnelly (ice hockey, born 1953), American ice hockey player who played in the World Hockey Association

== See also ==
- Patrick Donnelly (disambiguation)
- Patricia Donnelly, beauty queen
