= Kincaid, Saskatchewan =

Village in Saskatchewan, Canada

Kincaid
- Village
- Village of Kincaid
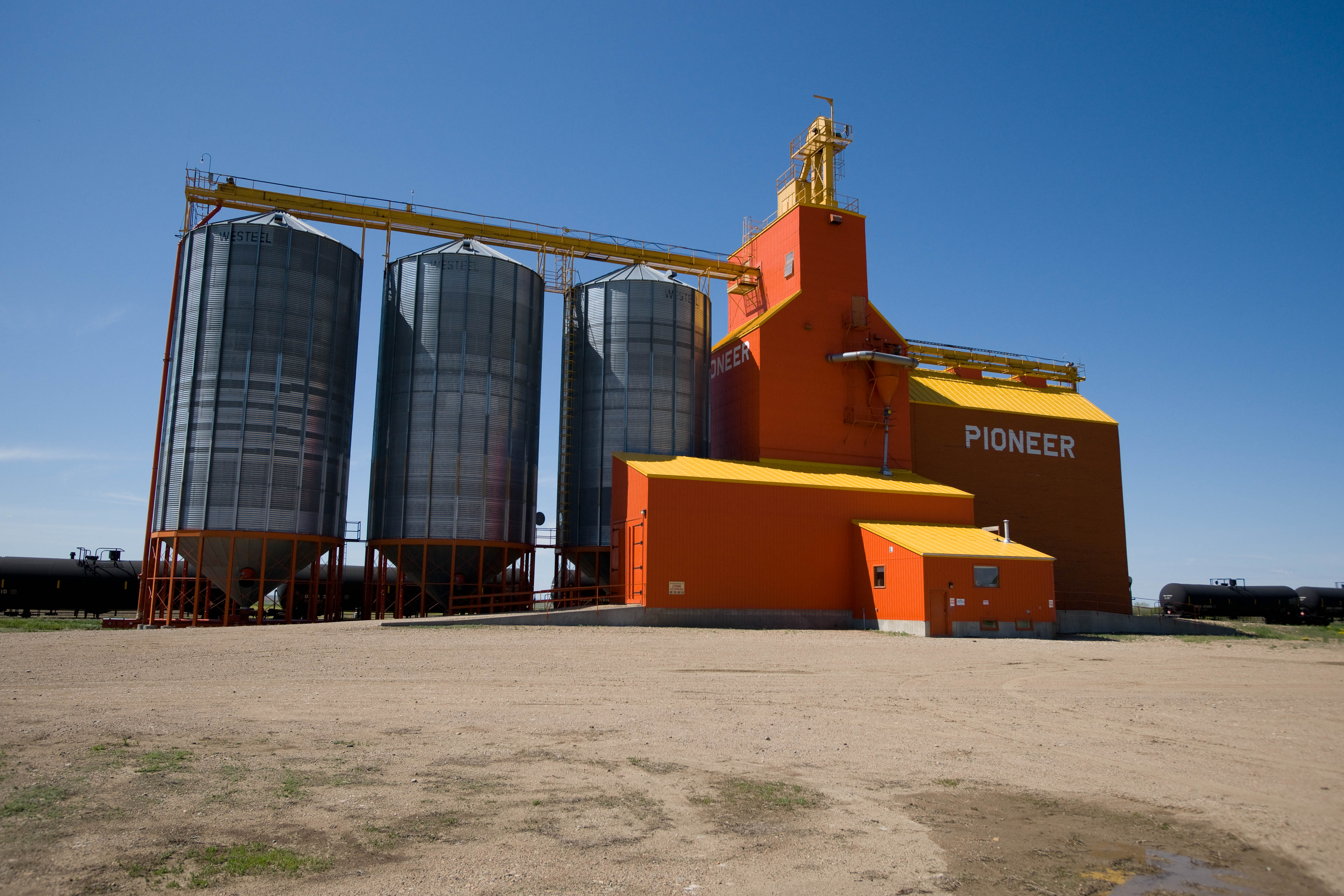
- Grain elevator in Kincaid

- Location within Pinto Creek No. 75 Location within Saskatchewan
- Coordinates: 49.671°N 107.006°W
- Country: Canada
- Province: Saskatchewan
- Region: South-central
- Census division: 3
- Rural Municipality: Pinto Creek No. 75
- Post office Founded: November 1, 193
- Incorporated (Village): July 19, 1913

Government
  - Type: Municipal
  - Governing body: Kincaid Village Council
  - Mayor: Kayla Marshall
  - Administrator: Melissa Masse

Area
  - Total: 0.82 km^{2} (0.32 sq mi)

Population (2016)
  - Total: 111
  - Density: 135.7/km^{2} (351/sq mi)
- Time zone: UTC-6 (CST)
- Postal code: S0H 2J0
- Area code: 306
- Highways: Highway 13; Highway 19
- Railways: Great Western Railway
- Website: Village of Kincaid

Kincaid (2016 population: 111) is a village in the Canadian province of Saskatchewan within the Rural Municipality of Pinto Creek No. 75 and Census Division No. 3.

== History ==
Kincaid incorporated as a village on July 19, 1913.

== Demographics ==
Population history (1981–2016)
| Year | Pop. | ±% |
|---|---|---|
| 1981 | 256 | — |
| 1986 | 237 | −7.4% |
| 1991 | 197 | −16.9% |
| 1996 | 177 | −10.2% |
| 2001 | 161 | −9.0% |
| 2006 | 135 | −16.1% |
| 2011 | 114 | −15.6% |
| 2016 | 111 | −2.6% |
Source: Statistics Canada via Saskatchewan Bureau of Statistics

In the 2021 Census of Population conducted by Statistics Canada, Kincaid had a population of 120 living in 59 of its 83 total private dwellings, a change of 8.1% from its 2016 population of 111. With a land area of 0.54 km^{2} (0.21 sq mi), it had a population density of 222.2/km^{2} (575.6/sq mi) in 2021.

In the 2016 Census of Population, the Village of Kincaid recorded a population of 111 living in 56 of its 65 total private dwellings, a −2.7% change from its 2011 population of 114. With a land area of 0.82 km^{2} (0.32 sq mi), it had a population density of 135.4/km^{2} (350.6/sq mi) in 2016.

== Climate ==
Climate data for Kincaid
| Month | Jan | Feb | Mar | Apr | May | Jun | Jul | Aug | Sep | Oct | Nov | Dec | Year |
|---|---|---|---|---|---|---|---|---|---|---|---|---|---|
| Record high °C (°F) | 12.8 (55.0) | 17 (63) | 23 (73) | 32 (90) | 37 (99) | 43.5 (110.3) | 39 (102) | 39.5 (103.1) | 37.2 (99.0) | 33 (91) | 21.7 (71.1) | 12.2 (54.0) | 43.5 (110.3) |
| Mean daily maximum °C (°F) | −7.2 (19.0) | −3.6 (25.5) | 3.4 (38.1) | 12.3 (54.1) | 19.1 (66.4) | 23.5 (74.3) | 26.4 (79.5) | 26.5 (79.7) | 19.8 (67.6) | 12.5 (54.5) | 1.2 (34.2) | −5.5 (22.1) | 10.7 (51.3) |
| Daily mean °C (°F) | −13 (9) | −9.4 (15.1) | −2.6 (27.3) | 4.9 (40.8) | 11.3 (52.3) | 15.9 (60.6) | 18.3 (64.9) | 18.1 (64.6) | 11.9 (53.4) | 5.3 (41.5) | −4.5 (23.9) | −11.4 (11.5) | 3.7 (38.7) |
| Mean daily minimum °C (°F) | −18.8 (−1.8) | −15.2 (4.6) | −8.7 (16.3) | −2.5 (27.5) | 3.5 (38.3) | 8.3 (46.9) | 10.3 (50.5) | 9.7 (49.5) | 4.1 (39.4) | −1.9 (28.6) | −10.2 (13.6) | −17.2 (1.0) | −3.2 (26.2) |
| Record low °C (°F) | −41.7 (−43.1) | −42 (−44) | −34.4 (−29.9) | −28.3 (−18.9) | −11 (12) | −6.1 (21.0) | 0 (32) | −3 (27) | −14 (7) | −25 (−13) | −36.5 (−33.7) | −45 (−49) | −45 (−49) |
| Average precipitation mm (inches) | 16.7 (0.66) | 13.1 (0.52) | 17.3 (0.68) | 18.2 (0.72) | 50.7 (2.00) | 65.1 (2.56) | 57.6 (2.27) | 35.6 (1.40) | 32.2 (1.27) | 18.2 (0.72) | 14.3 (0.56) | 19.6 (0.77) | 358.5 (14.11) |
Source: Environment Canada

== Infrastructure ==
Saskatchewan Transportation Company provided regular intercity bus service to Kincaid, until STC was dissolved in 2017.

== Notable people ==
- Ross Belsher, politician and businessman
- Pat Donnelly, retired ice hockey winger
- Billy Taylor, ice hockey player who played two games for the New York Rangers in the 1964–65 season

== See also ==
- List of communities in Saskatchewan
- List of villages in Saskatchewan
