= Frank Bainard Stacey =

Canadian politician

Frank Bainard Stacey (October 27, 1859 – March 18, 1930) was a minister, fruit grower and political figure in British Columbia, Canada. He represented Westminster District in the House of Commons of Canada from 1917 to 1921 as a supporter of Sir Robert Borden's wartime Union Government.

He was born in St. Thomas, Canada West (now St. Thomas, Ontario). He was the son of Samuel Stacey and Emma Bainard, and educated there and at Victoria University in Cobourg. In 1885, he married Sue J. Fish. Stacey was a Methodist minister in London, Ontario and Neepawa, Manitoba from 1878 to 1910. In 1910, he established a fruit farm in Chilliwack, British Columbia. Stacey was defeated by Elgin Albert Munro when he ran for reelection in the riding, now named Fraser Valley in 1921. He died in Chilliwack at the age of 70.
