= Chuck Strahl =

Canadian politician (1957–2024)

The Honourable Chuck Strahl PC
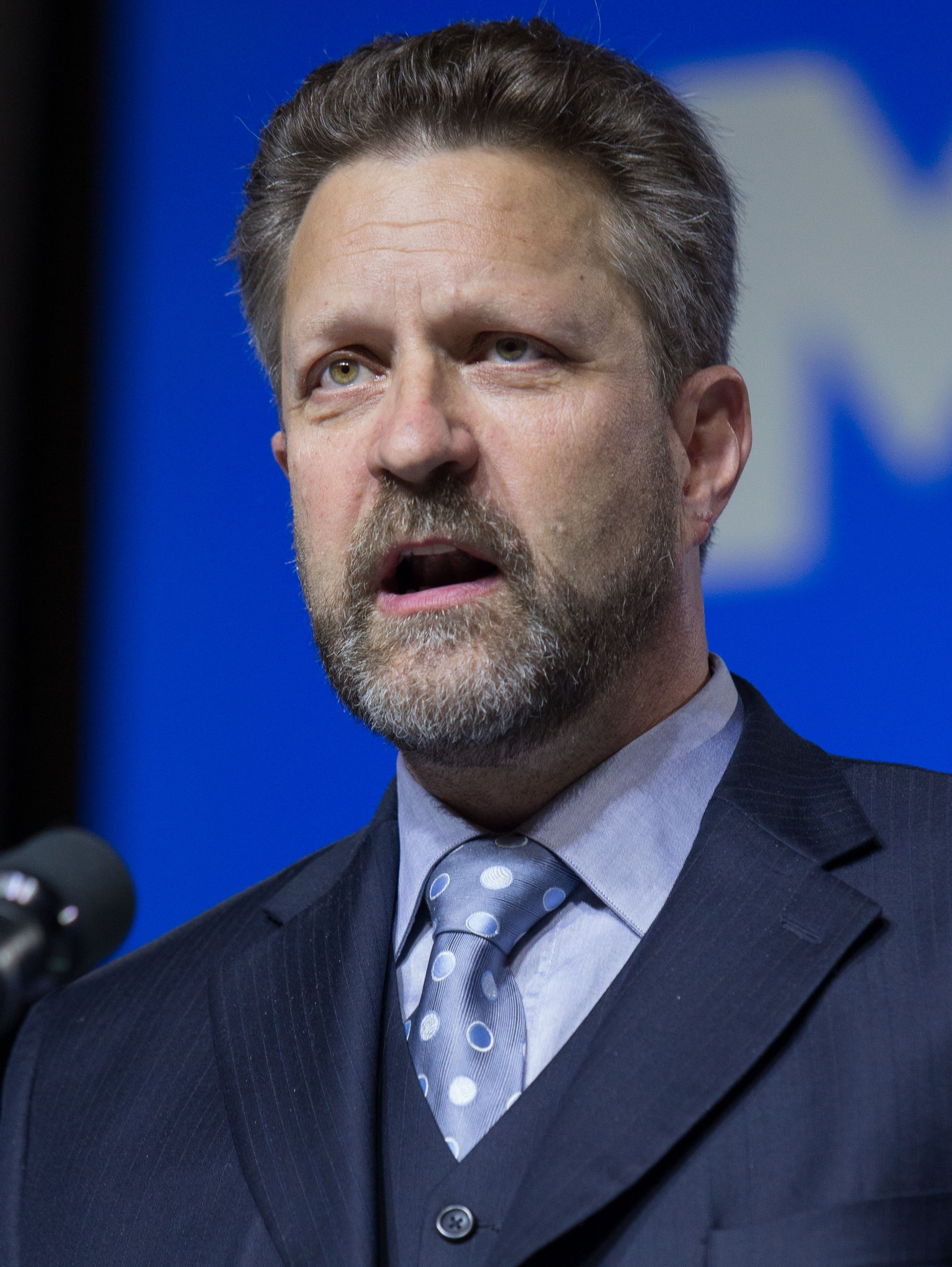
- Strahl in 2014

Minister of Transport, Infrastructure and Communities
- In office August 6, 2010 – May 18, 2011
- Prime Minister: Stephen Harper
- Preceded by: John Baird
- Succeeded by: Denis Lebel

Minister of Indian Affairs and Northern Development
- In office August 14, 2007 – August 6, 2010
- Prime Minister: Stephen Harper
- Preceded by: Jim Prentice
- Succeeded by: John Duncan

Minister of Agriculture
- In office February 6, 2006 – August 14, 2007
- Prime Minister: Stephen Harper
- Preceded by: Andy Mitchell
- Succeeded by: Gerry Ritz

Member of Parliament for Chilliwack—Fraser Canyon (Fraser Valley; 1997–2004) (Fraser Valley East; 1993–1997)
- In office October 25, 1993 – May 2, 2011
- Preceded by: Ross Belsher
- Succeeded by: Mark Strahl

Personal details
- Born: Charles Richard Strahl; February 25, 1957 New Westminster, British Columbia, Canada
- Died: August 13, 2024 (aged 67) Chilliwack, British Columbia, Canada
- Party: Conservative (from 2003)
- Other political affiliations: Reform (1993–2000); Canadian Alliance (2000–2001, 2002–2003); Democratic Representative Caucus (2001–2002)
- Spouse: Deb Strahl
- Children: 4, including Karina Strahl Loewen and Mark Strahl
- Education: Trinity Western University
- Occupation: Businessman, politician

Charles Richard Strahl PC (February 25, 1957 – August 13, 2024) was a Canadian businessman and politician from British Columbia who served as a Member of Parliament (MP) from 1993 to 2011. First elected for the Reform Party of Canada (which became the Canadian Alliance), he was the leader of the Democratic Representative Caucus that left the Alliance in opposition to Stockwell Day's leadership. He subsequently returned to the Alliance caucus, and became a member of the Conservative Party in 2003. After the Conservatives won power in 2006, he joined the cabinet of Prime Minister Stephen Harper, and served as Minister of Agriculture, Indian and Northern Affairs, and Transportation.

On June 14, 2012, Strahl was appointed to serve a five-year term as chair of the Security Intelligence Review Committee, but resigned in controversy over conflict of interest accusations resulting from his lobbying efforts for oil and pipeline companies.

== Background ==
Strahl was born in New Westminster, British Columbia, the son of Martha (Ens) Schroeder and Omer William "Bill" Strahl. After moving around rural British Columbia in his childhood, he settled in the Chilliwack community of Ryder Lake at age 10. He attended Trinity Western University, and worked for Cheam Construction, a logging and road-building company owned by his father. Chuck Strahl and his siblings took over the business after their father died.

== Member of Parliament ==
=== Opposition (1993–2006) ===
Strahl ran in the 1993 federal election as a Reform Party candidate in Fraser Valley East, and defeated the incumbent Progressive Conservative (PC) candidate Ross Belsher to become the riding's MP as part of Reform's sweep in the region. He introduced four private member's bills during his first term as an MP, including Bill C-295, the Peacekeeping Act, which proposed to amend the National Defence Act to mandate parliamentary approval for Canadian Forces missions. He was the Reform Party's deputy whip from 1993 to 1995, then became whip in May 1996, and served as critic for the Treasury Board (1994-1995) and natural resources (1995-1997) in the 35th Parliament.

Following the dissolution of the Fraser Valley East riding, Strahl ran in the re-constituted district of Fraser Valley in the 1997 election, defeating Liberal candidate John Les and others to remain in the House of Commons. With Reform becoming the official opposition in the 36th Parliament, he served as chief opposition whip from 1997 to January 2000, then as Opposition House Leader; he was also assistant critic for foreign affairs.

He was re-elected in the 2000 election as a member of the Canadian Alliance, which had replaced Reform earlier in the year. He continued in his role as Opposition House Leader, but resigned in April 2001 over differences with party leader Stockwell Day. He remained an Alliance MP, but was suspended from caucus in May 2001 before being expelled that September. The expelled Alliance MPs formed the Democratic Representative Caucus with Strahl as parliamentary leader, and entered into a coalition with the Progressive Conservatives.

Strahl returned to the Alliance caucus in 2002 after Stephen Harper took over as party leader, and was named Alliance deputy house leader in June 2003. He became part of the Conservative Party caucus in December 2003 following the Alliance/PC merger, and had intended to launch a bid for the merged party's leadership, but failed to secure enough financial or political support. His inability to speak French and lingering distrust among many colleagues over the perceived disloyalty shown to his party in 2001 also frustrated his own leadership ambitions. He then supported Tony Clement in the latter's failed leadership bid.

He was re-elected in the 2004 election in the newly established district of Chilliwack—Fraser Canyon. The riding comprises the Upper Fraser Valley, a primarily agricultural area of the province, and the Fraser Canyon-Lillooet-Bridge River regions, which are mostly wilderness with a resource-based economy and, like the Chilliwack area, have a significant First Nations population. At the outset of the 38th Parliament in October 2004, Strahl was appointed Deputy Speaker and Chairman of Committees of the Whole under the new rules brought about as a result of the Liberal minority government situation.

=== Government (2006–2011) ===
After the Conservatives won minority government in the 2006 election, the re-elected Strahl was appointed Minister of Agriculture and Agri-Food, Minister responsible for the Canadian Wheat Board (CWB), and Minister responsible for the Canadian Dairy Commission at the beginning of the 39th Parliament on 6 February 2006. Strahl removed upwards of 16,000 farmers from the voters list in the midst of the 2006 election to the CWB. They were disqualified for such reasons as not having delivered any grain to the Wheat Board in the previous two years or not having produced enough wheat or malt barley to have generated significant enough income from which to subsist. On 19 December 2006 he dismissed CWB president Adrian Measner, because "It's a position that [he] serves at pleasure. And that position was no longer his" because he displeased the Cabinet.

Strahl was appointed Minister of Indian Affairs and Northern Development and Federal Interlocutor for Métis and Non-Status Indians in a cabinet shuffle on 14 August 2007. He retained that role after his re-election in 2008, and added to his responsibilities the title of Minister of the Canadian Northern Economic Development Agency in August 2009. He was re-assigned as Minister of Transport, Infrastructure and Communities in August 2010. On March 12, 2011, Strahl announced he would not seek re-election in the upcoming federal election, which was held on May 2, 2011.

== Chair of Security Intelligence Review Committee (2012–2014) Controversy ==
On June 14, 2012, Strahl was appointed to serve a five-year term as chair of the Security Intelligence Review Committee (SIRC), the watchdog for the Canadian Security Intelligence Service. In January 2014, he resigned his position as chair after the media revealed that he was a registered lobbyist for the Enbridge Northern Gateway project. Former Conservative MP Deborah Grey, already a SIRC member, was appointed Strahl's successor by Prime Minister Stephen Harper.

== Personal life ==
Strahl married Debby Bateman in 1975; they had four children together. In August 2005, he announced that he had lung cancer as the result of exposure to asbestos many years prior; the illness was diagnosed after one of his lungs collapsed twice.

On March 18, 2011, his son Mark secured the nomination for the Conservative Party in the riding of Chilliwack—Fraser Canyon. The nomination process, which is usually open for four weeks, lasted only a week. Mark Strahl was endorsed by Preston Manning, former leader of the Reform Party of Canada, who said "Mark Strahl—by virtue of his family background … is well prepared for service in the House of Commons." Former Chilliwack City Councillor Casey Langbroek said most Conservative Party members from the riding were upset and that the nomination process effectively barred 80% of party members from running. Party member Alex Moens said "High public office should not be like a family business, where it's passed on from father to son."

After a prolonged battle with mesothelioma, Strahl died in Chilliwack on August 13, 2024, at the age of 67.

28th Canadian Ministry (2006–2015) – Cabinet of Stephen Harper
Cabinet posts (3)
Predecessor	Office	Successor
John Baird	Minister of Transport, Infrastructure and Communities; August 6, 2010 – May 2, 2011	Denis Lebel
Jim Prentice	Minister of Indian Affairs and Northern Development; August 14, 2007 – August 6, 2010	John Duncan
Andy Mitchell	Minister of Agriculture; February 6, 2006 – August 14, 2007	Gerry Ritz
Political offices
Preceded by Bob Kilger	Deputy Speaker of the House of Commons & Chairman of Committees of the Whole; 2004–2006	Succeeded by Bill Blaikie
