= Westminster District (federal electoral district) =

Former federal electoral district in British Columbia, Canada

British Columbia electoral district

Defunct federal electoral district
- Legislature: House of Commons
- District created: 1914
- District abolished: 1919
- First contested: 1917
- Last contested: 1917

Westminster District was a federal electoral district in British Columbia, Canada, that was represented in the House of Commons of Canada from 1917 to 1921.

This riding was created in 1914 and was used only in the federal election of 1917. It was partly created out of the New Westminster and partly from the Yale—Cariboo electoral district. It was renamed to "Fraser Valley" from 1919 to 1966.

== Members of Parliament ==
Parliament	Years	Member	Party
Riding created from New Westminster and Yale—Cariboo
13th	1917–1921	Frank Bainard Stacey	Government (Unionist)
Riding dissolved into Fraser Valley

== Election results ==
1917 Canadian federal election
Party	Candidate	Votes	%
Government (Unionist)	Frank Bainard Stacey	4,074	69.45
Opposition (Laurier Liberals)	Peter Bethavan Hamilton Ramsey	1,792	30.55
Total valid votes		5,866	100.00
This riding was created from parts of New Westminster and Yale—Cariboo, both of which elected a Conservative in the last election.

== See also ==
- List of Canadian electoral districts
- Historical federal electoral districts of Canada
