= Fraser Valley (electoral district) =

Former federal electoral district in British Columbia, Canada

British Columbia electoral district

Defunct federal electoral district
- Legislature: House of Commons
- District created: 1997
- District abolished: 2004
- First contested: 1997
- Last contested: 2000

Fraser Valley was a federal electoral district in British Columbia, Canada, that was represented in the House of Commons of Canada from 1921 to 1968 and from 1997 to 2004.

== History ==
This electoral district has existed twice. It was first created in 1919 from Westminster District. In 1966, it was abolished when it was redistributed into Fraser Valley East, Fraser Valley West and Coast Chilcotin ridings.

It was reformed in 1996 from Fraser Valley East and Fraser Valley West ridings. It was again abolished in 2003 when it was divided between Abbotsford and Chilliwack—Fraser Canyon ridings.

== Members of Parliament ==
This riding elected the following members of Parliament:

| Parliament | Years | Member | Party |
|---|---|---|---|
Riding created from Westminster District
| 14th | 1921–1925 | Elgin Albert Munro | Liberal |
| 15th | 1925–1926 | Harry James Barber | Conservative |
| 16th | 1926–1930 | Harry James Barber | Conservative |
| 17th | 1930–1935 | Harry James Barber | Conservative |
| 18th | 1935–1940 | Harry James Barber | Conservative |
| 19th | 1940–1945 | George Cruickshank | Liberal |
| 20th | 1945–1949 | George Cruickshank | Liberal |
| 21st | 1949–1953 | George Cruickshank | Liberal |
| 22nd | 1953–1957 | Alexander Bell Patterson | Social Credit |
| 23rd | 1957–1958 | Alexander Bell Patterson | Social Credit |
| 24th | 1958–1962 | William Harold Hicks | Progressive Conservative |
| 25th | 1962–1963 | Alexander Bell Patterson | Social Credit |
| 26th | 1963–1965 | Alexander Bell Patterson | Social Credit |
| 27th | 1965–1968 | Alexander Bell Patterson | Social Credit |
Riding dissolved into Fraser Valley East, Fraser Valley West and Coast Chilcotin
Riding re-created from Fraser Valley East and Fraser Valley West
| 36th | 1997–2000 | Chuck Strahl | Reform |
| 36th | 2000–2000 | Chuck Strahl | Alliance |
| 37th | 2000–2001 | Chuck Strahl | Alliance |
| 37th | 2001–2002 | Chuck Strahl | Democratic Representative |
| 37th | 2002–2003 | Chuck Strahl | Alliance |
| 37th | 2003–2004 | Chuck Strahl | Conservative |
Riding dissolved into Abbotsford and Chilliwack—Fraser Canyon

== Election results ==
=== Fraser Valley, 1997–2004 ===
2000 Canadian federal election
| Party | Candidate | Votes | % | ±% | Expenditures |
|---|---|---|---|---|---|
| Alliance | Chuck Strahl | 38,509 | 69.97 | +7.12 | $60,527 |
| Liberal | Hal Singleton | 8,965 | 16.29 | –5.68 | $60,527 |
| New Democratic | Rob Lees | 3,185 | 5.79 | –3.10 | $2,392 |
| Progressive Conservative | Rocky Nenka | 2,330 | 4.23 | +0.98 | $2,582 |
| Marijuana | Norm Siefken | 811 | 1.47 | – | none listed |
| Green | Carol Battaglio | 528 | 0.96 | +0.31 | none listed |
| Canadian Action | Debbie Anderson | 425 | 0.77 | – | none listed |
| Independent | Edward John Van Woudenberg | 212 | 0.39 | – | $1,798 |
| Communist | Chris Bolster | 69 | 0.13 | – | $189 |
| Total valid votes | | 55,034 | 99.70 | | |
| Total rejected ballots | | 164 | 0.30 | –0.05 | |
| Turnout | | 55,198 | 63.90 | –3.12 | |
| Eligible voters | | 86,387 | | | |
| Alliance hold | | Swing | | +6.40 | |
Change for the Canadian Alliance is based on the Reform Party.
Source: Elections Canada

1997 Canadian federal election
| Party | Candidate | Votes | % | Expenditures |
|---|---|---|---|---|
| Reform | Chuck Strahl | 33,101 | 62.85 | $57,306 |
| Liberal | John Les | 11,569 | 21.97 | $63,061 |
| New Democratic | Rob Lees | 4,680 | 8.89 | $21,339 |
| Progressive Conservative | Harry Wiens | 1,714 | 3.25 | $6,999 |
| Christian Heritage | Rodger N. Brown | 1,047 | 1.99 | $23,870 |
| Green | Carol Battaglio | 342 | 0.65 | none listed |
| Natural Law | Patrick Boylan | 118 | 0.22 | $5 |
| Independent | Sa Tan | 95 | 0.18 | none listed |
| Total valid votes | | 52,666 | 99.66 | |
| Total rejected ballots | | 182 | 0.34 | |
| Turnout | | 52,848 | 67.02 | |
| Eligible voters | | 78,853 | | |
| Reform notional hold | | Swing | | – |
This riding was re-created from Fraser Valley East and Fraser Valley West, both of which elected a Reform Party candidate. Chuck Strahl was the incumbent from Fraser Valley East.
Source: Elections Canada

=== Fraser Valley, 1921–1968 ===
1965 Canadian federal election
| Party | Candidate | Votes | % | ±% |
|---|---|---|---|---|
| Social Credit | Alexander Bell Patterson | 12,611 | 34.98 | +4.87 |
| New Democratic | Mark Rose | 10,563 | 29.30 | +3.81 |
| Liberal | Harold Martyn McDonald | 8,167 | 22.65 | –1.50 |
| Progressive Conservative | Don Hall | 4,442 | 12.32 | –7.32 |
| Independent | Frank Krenn | 272 | 0.75 | – |
| Total valid votes | | 36,055 | 99.21 | |
| Total rejected ballots | | 286 | 0.79 | +0.13 |
| Turnout | | 36,341 | 77.39 | –6.31 |
| Eligible voters | | 46,956 | | |
| Social Credit hold | | Swing | | +4.34 |
Source: Library of Parliament

1963 Canadian federal election
| Party | Candidate | Votes | % | ±% |
|---|---|---|---|---|
| Social Credit | Alexander Bell Patterson | 11,500 | 30.11 | +2.25 |
| New Democratic | Erhart Regier | 9,735 | 25.49 | +0.63 |
| Liberal | Wilfred R. Jack | 9,226 | 24.16 | +0.80 |
| Progressive Conservative | William Harold Hicks | 7,500 | 19.64 | –4.29 |
| Independent | Helen Millar | 232 | 0.61 | – |
| Total valid votes | | 38,193 | 99.35 | |
| Total rejected ballots | | 251 | 0.65 | –0.20 |
| Turnout | | 38,444 | 83.70 | +3.38 |
| Eligible voters | | 45,929 | | |
| Social Credit hold | | Swing | | +1.44 |
Source: Library of Parliament

1962 Canadian federal election
| Party | Candidate | Votes | % | ±% |
|---|---|---|---|---|
| Social Credit | Alexander Bell Patterson | 9,970 | 27.86 | +4.33 |
| New Democratic | Bill Hartley | 8,896 | 24.86 | +6.96 |
| Progressive Conservative | William Harold Hicks | 8,562 | 23.93 | –20.16 |
| Liberal | Walter Richard Ferguson | 8,357 | 23.35 | +8.87 |
| Total valid votes | | 35,785 | 99.15 | |
| Total rejected ballots | | 308 | 0.85 | +0.25 |
| Turnout | | 36,093 | 80.32 | +1.99 |
| Eligible voters | | 44,934 | | |
| Social Credit gain from Progressive Conservative | | Swing | | +12.25 |
Source: Library of Parliament

1958 Canadian federal election
| Party | Candidate | Votes | % | ±% |
|---|---|---|---|---|
| Progressive Conservative | William Harold Hicks | 13,890 | 44.09 | +19.98 |
| Social Credit | Alexander Bell Patterson | 7,414 | 23.53 | –15.15 |
| Co-operative Commonwealth | Wesley N. Watson | 5,640 | 17.90 | –0.95 |
| Liberal | Thomas Foster Isherwood | 4,562 | 14.48 | –3.87 |
| Total valid votes | | 31,506 | 99.40 | |
| Total rejected ballots | | 190 | 0.60 | –0.22 |
| Turnout | | 31,696 | 78.33 | +4.32 |
| Eligible voters | | 40,464 | | |
| Progressive Conservative gain from Social Credit | | Swing | | +17.57 |
Source: Library of Parliament

1957 Canadian federal election
| Party | Candidate | Votes | % | ±% |
|---|---|---|---|---|
| Social Credit | Alexander Bell Patterson | 11,091 | 38.69 | –2.95 |
| Progressive Conservative | Ernest McLauchlin Adair | 6,911 | 24.11 | – |
| Co-operative Commonwealth | Kenneth William Pattern | 5,405 | 18.85 | +3.58 |
| Liberal | Douglas Scott Steinson | 5,262 | 18.35 | –21.99 |
| Total valid votes | | 28,669 | 99.18 | |
| Total rejected ballots | | 237 | 0.82 | –0.11 |
| Turnout | | 28,906 | 74.02 | +8.69 |
| Eligible voters | | 39,054 | | |
| Social Credit hold | | Swing | | – |
Source: Library of Parliament

1953 Canadian federal election
| Party | Candidate | Votes | % | ±% |
|---|---|---|---|---|
| Social Credit | Alexander Bell Patterson | 9,618 | 41.64 | – |
| Liberal | George Cruickshank | 9,318 | 40.34 | –15.17 |
| Co-operative Commonwealth | John Hampson Wilde | 3,527 | 15.27 | –9.31 |
| Labor–Progressive | Carl Christian Hilland | 635 | 2.75 | – |
| Total valid votes | | 23,098 | 99.07 | |
| Total rejected ballots | | 216 | 0.93 | +0.14 |
| Turnout | | 23,314 | 65.33 | –3.22 |
| Eligible voters | | 35,689 | | |
| Social Credit gain from Liberal | | Swing | | +28.40 |
Source: Library of Parliament

1949 Canadian federal election
| Party | Candidate | Votes | % | ±% |
|---|---|---|---|---|
| Liberal | George Cruickshank | 12,587 | 55.51 | +15.59 |
| Co-operative Commonwealth | Eric Symonds Flowerdew | 5,573 | 24.58 | –3.56 |
| Progressive Conservative | Edward Stuart Davidson | 4,514 | 19.91 | –12.03 |
| Total valid votes | | 22,674 | 99.21 | |
| Total rejected ballots | | 180 | 0.79 | –0.03 |
| Turnout | | 22,854 | 68.55 | –15.26 |
| Eligible voters | | 33,341 | | |
| Liberal hold | | Swing | | +9.57 |
Source: Library of Parliament

1945 Canadian federal election
| Party | Candidate | Votes | % | ±% |
|---|---|---|---|---|
| Liberal | George Cruickshank | 7,629 | 39.93 | –2.28 |
| Progressive Conservative | Earl Leslie Macleod | 6,102 | 31.93 | –7.56 |
| Co-operative Commonwealth | Henry Peter Tyson | 5,377 | 28.14 | +9.85 |
| Total valid votes | | 19,108 | 99.18 | |
| Total rejected ballots | | 158 | 0.82 | –0.58 |
| Turnout | | 19,266 | 83.80 | +4.82 |
| Eligible voters | | 22,990 | | |
| Liberal hold | | Swing | | +2.64 |
Source: Library of Parliament

1940 Canadian federal election
| Party | Candidate | Votes | % | ±% |
|---|---|---|---|---|
| Liberal | George Cruickshank | 6,638 | 42.21 | +15.45 |
| National Government | Harry James Barber | 6,211 | 39.50 | +4.98 |
| Co-operative Commonwealth | James Warren Penberthy | 2,877 | 18.29 | –10.45 |
| Total valid votes | | 15,726 | 98.60 | |
| Total rejected ballots | | 223 | 1.40 | +0.39 |
| Turnout | | 15,949 | 78.99 | +2.03 |
| Eligible voters | | 20,192 | | |
| Liberal gain from Conservative | | Swing | | +12.95 |
Source: Library of Parliament

1935 Canadian federal election
| Party | Candidate | Votes | % | ±% |
|---|---|---|---|---|
| Conservative | Harry James Barber | 4,359 | 34.52 | –17.63 |
| Co-operative Commonwealth | James Miller Cameron | 3,630 | 28.74 | – |
| Liberal | James Frederick Semple | 3,379 | 26.76 | –21.10 |
| Reconstruction | George Foster Partt | 1,261 | 9.98 | – |
| Total valid votes | | 12,629 | 98.99 | |
| Total rejected ballots | | 129 | 1.01 | +1.01 |
| Turnout | | 12,758 | 76.95 | –7.34 |
| Eligible voters | | 16,579 | | |
| Conservative hold | | Swing | | +19.37 |
Source: Library of Parliament

1930 Canadian federal election
| Party | Candidate | Votes | % | ±% |
|---|---|---|---|---|
| Conservative | Harry James Barber | 6,946 | 52.15 | –8.01 |
| Liberal | Gerry McGeer | 6,374 | 47.85 | +8.01 |
| Total valid votes | | 13,320 | 100.00 | |
| Total rejected ballots | | – | | |
| Turnout | | 13,320 | 84.29 | +41.24 |
| Eligible voters | | 15,802 | | |
| Conservative hold | | Swing | | –8.01 |
Source: Library of Parliament

1926 Canadian federal election
| Party | Candidate | Votes | % | ±% |
|---|---|---|---|---|
| Conservative | Harry James Barber | 6,217 | 60.16 | +3.98 |
| Liberal | Elihu Manuel | 4,117 | 39.84 | –3.98 |
| Total valid votes | | 10,334 | 100.00 | |
| Total rejected ballots | | – | | |
| Turnout | | 10,334 | 43.05 | –34.99 |
| Eligible voters | | 24,004 | | |
| Conservative hold | | Swing | | +3.98 |
Source: Library of Parliament

1925 Canadian federal election
| Party | Candidate | Votes | % | ±% |
|---|---|---|---|---|
| Conservative | Harry James Barber | 5,751 | 56.18 | +7.46 |
| Liberal | Elgin Albert Munro | 4,485 | 43.82 | –7.46 |
| Total valid votes | | 10,236 | 100.00 | |
| Total rejected ballots | | – | | |
| Turnout | | 10,236 | 78.04 | +2.58 |
| Eligible voters | | 13,116 | | |
| Conservative gain from Liberal | | Swing | | +7.46 |
Source: Library of Parliament

1921 Canadian federal election
| Party | Candidate | Votes | % | ±% |
|---|---|---|---|---|
| Liberal | Elgin Albert Munro | 4,307 | 51.28 | – |
| Conservative | Frank Bainard Stacey | 4,092 | 48.72 | – |
| Total valid votes | | 8,399 | 100.00 | |
| Total rejected ballots | | – | | |
| Turnout | | 8,399 | 75.46 | – |
| Eligible voters | | 11,130 | | |
| Liberal notional gain | | Swing | | – |
This riding was created from Westminster District, where Unionist Frank Bainard Stacey was the incumbent.
Source: Library of Parliament

== See also ==
- List of Canadian federal electoral districts
- Historical federal electoral districts of Canada
