= Fraser Valley East =

Former federal electoral district in British Columbia, Canada

British Columbia electoral district

Defunct federal electoral district
- Legislature: House of Commons
- District created: 1966
- District abolished: 1996
- First contested: 1968
- Last contested: 1993

Fraser Valley East was a federal electoral district in British Columbia, Canada, that was represented in the House of Commons of Canada from 1968 to 1997. This riding was created in 1966 from parts of Fraser Valley, Kamloops and Okanagan Boundary ridings.

It was abolished in 1996 when it was merged into the Fraser Valley riding.

It initially consisted of:

- the Fraser-Cheam Regional District; and
- the part of the Central Fraser Valley Regional District lying east of Bradner Road in Matsqui District Municipality.

In 1987, it was redefined to consist of:

- the Fraser-Cheam Regional District;
- the part of Central Fraser Regional District lying east of a line drawn from the north boundary of the regional district south to Glenmore Road, along that road and the British Columbia Hydro & Power Railway right-of-way to the south boundary of Matsqui District Municipality, and west and south along that boundary to the southeast corner of Matsqui.

== Members of Parliament ==
This riding elected the following members of Parliament:

Parliament	Years	Member	Party
Riding created from Fraser Valley, Kamloops and Okanagan Boundary
28th	1968–1972	Jerry Pringle	Liberal
29th	1972–1974	Alexander Bell Patterson	Progressive Conservative
30th	1974–1979	Alexander Bell Patterson	Progressive Conservative
31st	1979–1980	Alexander Bell Patterson	Progressive Conservative
32nd	1980–1984	Alexander Bell Patterson	Progressive Conservative
33rd	1984–1988	Ross Belsher	Progressive Conservative
34th	1988–1993	Ross Belsher	Progressive Conservative
35th	1993–1997	Chuck Strahl	Reform
Riding dissolved into Fraser Valley

== Election results ==
=== 1993 ===
1993 Canadian federal election
Party	Candidate	Votes	%	±%
Reform	Chuck Strahl	23,494	45.91	+42.81
Liberal	Hal Singleton	15,782	30.84	+9.67
Progressive Conservative	Ross Belsher	6,648	12.99	–25.79
New Democratic	Rollie Keith	2,724	5.32	–22.69
Christian Heritage	Bill Boesterd	1,158	2.26	–6.04
National	Ernie Pope	851	1.66	–
Green	Richard Steven Kisby	243	0.47	–
Natural Law	Estelle Rachel Brooke	205	0.40	–
Canada Party	Croft Egan	67	0.13	–
Total valid votes		51,172	99.71	
Total rejected ballots		149	0.29	–0.01
Turnout		51,321	69.26	–9.71
Eligible voters		74,102		
Reform gain from Progressive Conservative		Swing		+16.69
Source: Elections Canada

=== 1988 ===
1988 Canadian federal election
Party	Candidate	Votes	%	±%
Progressive Conservative	Ross Belsher	16,631	38.79	–21.13
New Democratic	Don Olds	12,011	28.01	+4.14
Liberal	Janet Chisholm	9,076	21.17	+6.33
Christian Heritage	Ron Gray	3,560	8.30	–
Reform	Ray Renwick	1,329	3.10	–
Rhinoceros	B.J. Wills	272	0.63	–
Total valid votes		42,879	99.70	
Total rejected ballots		128	0.30	+0.03
Turnout		43,007	78.96	+5.34
Eligible voters		54,465		
Progressive Conservative hold		Swing		–12.64
Source: Elections Canada

=== 1984 ===
1984 Canadian federal election
Party	Candidate	Votes	%	±%
Progressive Conservative	Ross Belsher	32,073	59.92	+10.20
New Democratic	David Carstairs Menzies	12,779	23.87	–0.31
Liberal	John H. Vollebregt	7,942	14.84	–6.62
Libertarian	J. Wayne Marsden	735	1.37	–
Total valid votes		53,529	99.74	
Total rejected ballots		141	0.26	+0.01
Turnout		53,670	73.63	+2.71
Eligible voters		72,896		
Progressive Conservative hold		Swing		+5.26
Source: Elections Canada

=== 1980 ===
1980 Canadian federal election
Party	Candidate	Votes	%	±%
Progressive Conservative	Alexander Bell Patterson	21,989	49.71	–7.35
New Democratic	Harry W. Fontaine	10,695	24.18	+2.80
Liberal	Jack Suderman	9,490	21.46	+0.59
Independent	John Pankratz	2,057	4.65	–
Total valid votes		44,231	99.75	
Total rejected ballots		111	0.25	+0.04
Turnout		44,342	70.92	–1.02
Eligible voters		62,527		
Progressive Conservative hold		Swing		–5.08
Source: Elections Canada

=== 1979 ===
1979 Canadian federal election
Party	Candidate	Votes	%	±%
Progressive Conservative	Alexander Bell Patterson	24,363	57.07	+10.74
New Democratic	Harry W. Fontaine	9,126	21.38	+5.37
Liberal	Johann Joe Erickson	8,910	20.87	–16.79
Independent	Ken Brownlee	293	0.69	–
Total valid votes		42,692	99.79	
Total rejected ballots		89	0.21	–0.08
Turnout		42,781	71.93	–1.72
Eligible voters		59,472		
Progressive Conservative hold		Swing		+2.68
Source: Elections Canada

=== 1974 ===
1974 Canadian federal election
Party	Candidate	Votes	%	±%
Progressive Conservative	Alexander Bell Patterson	18,780	46.33	+11.59
Liberal	Ervin (Jerry) Pringle	15,268	37.66	+8.59
New Democratic	David Carstairs Menzies	6,489	16.01	–7.68
Total valid votes		40,537	99.71	
Total rejected ballots		119	0.29	–0.47
Turnout		40,656	73.66	+1.93
Eligible voters		55,196		
Progressive Conservative hold		Swing		+1.50
Source: Library of Parliament

=== 1972 ===
1972 Canadian federal election
Party	Candidate	Votes	%	±%
Progressive Conservative	Alexander Bell Patterson	12,302	34.74	+22.14
Liberal	Ervin (Jerry) Pringle	10,297	29.08	–5.66
New Democratic	Walt Heinrich	8,390	23.69	–0.17
Social Credit	Cyril Morley Shelford	4,426	12.50	–16.31
Total valid votes		35,415	99.24	
Total rejected ballots		273	0.77	+0.00
Turnout		35,688	71.73	–2.55
Eligible voters		49,753		
Progressive Conservative gain from Liberal		Swing		+13.90
Progressive Conservative candidate Alexander Bell Patterson gained 5.93 percentage points from the 1968 election, when he ran as a Social Credit.
Source: Library of Parliament

=== 1968 ===
1968 Canadian federal election
Party	Candidate	Votes	%	±%
Liberal	Ervin (Jerry) Pringle	9,689	34.74	–
Social Credit	Alexander Bell Patterson	8,035	28.81	–
New Democratic	Glenn C. Haddrell	6,654	23.86	–
Progressive Conservative	Oscar Dayton	3,514	12.60	–
Total valid votes		27,892	99.24	
Total rejected ballots		215	0.76	–
Turnout		28,107	74.28	–
Eligible voters		37,838		
Liberal notional gain		Swing		–
This riding was created from parts of Fraser Valley, Kamloops and Okanagan Boundary, which elected two Progressive Conservatives and a Social Credit (Fraser Valley) in the last election. Alexander Bell Patterson was the incumbent from Fraser Valley.
Source: Library of Parliament

== See also ==
- List of Canadian electoral districts
- Historical federal electoral districts of Canada
