= Hazenmore =

Village in Saskatchewan, Canada

- Village
- Village of Hazenmore
- Location within Pinto Creek No. 75 Location within Saskatchewan
- Coordinates: 49.687°N 107.138°W
- Country: Canada
- Province: Saskatchewan
- Rural municipality: Pinto Creek No. 75
- Post office Founded: 1913

Government
  - Type: Municipal
  - Governing body: Hazenmore Village Council
  - Mayor: Trevor Stender
  - Administrator: Abbie Bergen
  - MLA: Dave Marit
  - MP: Jeremy Patzer

Area
  - Total: 0.73 km^{2} (0.28 sq mi)

Population (2016)
  - Total: 70
  - Density: 96.2/km^{2} (249/sq mi)
- Time zone: UTC-6 (CST)
- Postal code: S0N 1C0
- Area code: 306
- Highways: Highway 13
- Railways: Great Western Railway

Hazenmore (2016 population: 70) is a village in the Canadian province of Saskatchewan within the Rural Municipality of Pinto Creek No. 75 and Census Division No. 3.

== History ==
Hazenmore incorporated as a village on August 20, 1913.

== Demographics ==
Population history (1981–2016)
Year	Pop.	±%
1981	124	—
1986	105	−15.3%
1991	89	−15.2%
1996	73	−18.0%
2001	71	−2.7%
2006	57	−19.7%
2011	50	−12.3%
2016	70	+40.0%
Source: Statistics Canada via Saskatchewan Bureau of Statistics

In the 2021 Census of Population conducted by Statistics Canada, Hazenmore had a population of 75 living in 26 of its 34 total private dwellings, a change of 15.4% from its 2016 population of 65. With a land area of 0.68 km^{2} (0.26 sq mi), it had a population density of 110.3/km^{2} (285.7/sq mi) in 2021.

In the 2016 Census of Population, the Village of Hazenmore recorded a population of 70 living in 28 of its 34 total private dwellings, a 28.6% change from its 2011 population of 50. With a land area of 0.73 km^{2} (0.28 sq mi), it had a population density of 95.9/km^{2} (248.4/sq mi) in 2016.

== Infrastructure ==
Saskatchewan Transportation Company once provided intercity bus service to Hazenmore, but the publicly owned and subsidized provincial bus service known as the Saskatchewan Transit Corporation or STC shut down in 2017.

== See also ==
- List of communities in Saskatchewan
- List of villages in Saskatchewan
