= James Donnelly =

James Donnelly may refer to:

== Politicians ==
- James A. Donnelly (1870–1952), American lawyer, politician and judge from New York
- James J. Donnelly (1866–1948), Canadian senator
- Jim Donnelly (politician) (born 1967), American politician from Maine

== Sportspeople ==
- James C. Donnelly (1881–1952), American football player and coach
- Boots Donnelly (James F. Donnelly, born 1942), American football coach
- James Donnelly (baseball) (1867–1933), baseball player
- Jim Donnelly (baseball) (1865–1915), Major League Baseball third baseman
- Jimmy Donnelly (bowls) (1928–1980), Irish lawn bowler
- Jim Donnelly (cricketer) (1906–1978), Australian cricketer
- James Donnelly (footballer) (1893–1959), Irish association football player and manager
- Jamesie Donnelly (fl. 2000s), Irish hurler
- Babe Donnelly (James Joseph Donnelly, 1894–1968), ice hockey player
- Jim Donnelly (snooker player) (1946–2026), Scottish snooker player
- Jimmy Donnelly (footballer) (1879–?), English footballer

== Others ==
- James Donnelly (bishop) (1823–1893), Irish Catholic bishop
- James S. Donnelly Jr. (born 1943), British and Irish historian

== See also ==
- Black Donnellys, whose patriarch was James Donnelly (1816–1880), an Irish Catholic immigrant family massacred in Canada, 1880
