= Rural Municipality of Pinto Creek No. 75 =

Rural municipality in Saskatchewan, Canada

Pinto Creek No. 75
- Rural municipality
- Rural Municipality of Pinto Creek No. 75

- Location of the RM of Pinto Creek No. 75 in Saskatchewan
- Coordinates: 49.639°N 107.036°W
- Country: Canada
- Province: Saskatchewan
- Census division: 3
- SARM division: 3
- Federal riding: Cypress Hills—Grasslands
- Provincial riding: Wood River
- Formed: January 1, 1913

Government
  - Reeve: Brian Corcoran
  - Governing body: RM of Pinto Creek No. 75 Council
  - Administrator: Roxanne Empey
  - Office location: Kincaid

Area (2016)
  - Land: 845.49 km^{2} (326.45 sq mi)

Population (2016)
  - Total: 283
  - Density: 0.3/km^{2} (0.78/sq mi)
- Time zone: CST
  - Summer (DST): CST
- Postal code: S0H 2J0
- Area codes: 306 and 639

The Rural Municipality of Pinto Creek No. 75 (2016 population: 283) is a rural municipality (RM) in the Canadian province of Saskatchewan within Census Division No. 3 and SARM Division No. 3. It is located in the southern portion of the province.

== History ==
The RM of Pinto Creek No. 75 incorporated as a rural municipality on January 1, 1913. It is named after Pinto Creek that flows through the RM.

== Geography ==
=== Communities and localities ===
The following urban municipalities are surrounded by the RM.

Villages

- Hazenmore
- Kincaid

The following unincorporated communities are within the RM.

Hamlets

- Meyronne

== Demographics ==
Population history (1981–2016)
| Year | Pop. | ±% |
|---|---|---|
| 1981 | 354 | — |
| 1986 | 317 | −10.5% |
| 1991 | 301 | −5.0% |
| 1996 | 271 | −10.0% |
| 2001 | 229 | −15.5% |
| 2006 | 204 | −10.9% |
| 2011 | 239 | +17.2% |
| 2016 | 283 | +18.4% |
Source: Statistics Canada via Saskatchewan Bureau of Statistics

In the 2021 Census of Population conducted by Statistics Canada, the RM of Pinto Creek No. 75 had a population of 251 living in 85 of its 104 total private dwellings, a change of −12.8% from its 2016 population of 288. With a land area of 838.82 km^{2} (323.87 sq mi), it had a population density of 0.3/km^{2} (0.8/sq mi) in 2021.

In the 2016 Census of Population, the RM of Pinto Creek No. 75 recorded a population of 283 living in 93 of its 115 total private dwellings, a 18.4% change from its 2011 population of 239. With a land area of 845.49 km^{2} (326.45 sq mi), it had a population density of 0.3/km^{2} (0.9/sq mi) in 2016.

== Government ==
The RM of Pinto Creek No. 75 is governed by an elected municipal council and an appointed administrator that meets on the first Thursday of every month. The reeve of the RM is Brian Corcoran while its administrator is Roxanne Empey. The RM's office is located in Kincaid.

== See also ==
- List of rural municipalities in Saskatchewan
