= Harry James Barber =

Canadian politician

Member of the Canadian Parliament for Fraser Valley
- In office 1925–1940
- Preceded by: Elgin Albert Munro
- Succeeded by: George Alexander Cruickshank

Personal details
- Born: March 29, 1875 Alton, Ontario, Canada
- Died: February 11, 1959 (aged 83) Chilliwack, British Columbia, Canada
- Party: Conservative
- Occupation: pharmacist

Harry James Barber (March 29, 1875 – February 11, 1959) was a Canadian politician. He was elected to the House of Commons of Canada in the 1925 election as a Member of the historical Conservative Party in the riding of Fraser Valley. He was re-elected in 1926, 1930, 1935 and defeated in 1940. Prior to his federal political experience, he was mayor of Chilliwack, British Columbia between 1914 and 1916 and also Chairman of the Chilliwack school board for eight years.
