= George Cruickshank (Canadian politician) =

Canadian politician

George Alexander Cruickshank

Member of Parliament for Fraser Valley
- In office March 1940 – August 1953
- Preceded by: Harry James Barber
- Succeeded by: Alexander Bell Patterson

Personal details
- Born: George Alexander Cruickshank; 13 February 1897 Minot, North Dakota, United States
- Died: 17 November 1970 (aged 73) Abbotsford, British Columbia
- Party: Liberal
- Spouse(s): Agnes Leslie Paterson m. May 1940
- Profession: farmer

George Alexander Cruickshank (13 February 1897 – 17 November 1970) was a Liberal party member of the House of Commons of Canada. He was born in Minot, North Dakota, United States and moved to Canada later in 1897. He became a farmer by career.

He was first elected to Parliament at the Fraser Valley riding in the 1940 general election then re-elected in 1945 and 1949. Cruickshank was defeated by Alexander Bell Patterson in the 1953 election.

Cruickshank served as reeve of Matsqui, British Columbia from 1931 to 1940. He died in Abbotsford, British Columbia in on 17 November 1970.
