= Charles Donnelly =

Charles Donnelly may refer to:

- Charles Donnelly (poet) (1914–1937), Irish poet and political activist
- Charles Donnelly (railroad) (1869–1939), president of Northern Pacific Railway, 1920–1939
- Charles L. Donnelly Jr. (1929–1994), United States Air Force general
- Charley Donnelly, Maryland Agricultural College football coach
- Charlie Donnelly, Irish motor racing driver
