= Patrick Donnelly =

Patrick Donnelly may refer to:

- Patrick Donnelly (bishop) (1650–1716), Irish Catholic bishop known as The Bard of Armagh
- Patrick Donnelly (politician) (1878–1947), Irish Parliamentary Party politician
- Patrick Donnelly (poet) (born 1956), American poet
- Patrick Donnelly (Irish republican), IRA member

== See also ==
- Pat Donnelly (disambiguation)
