= Mark Strahl =

Canadian politician

Mark Strahl MP
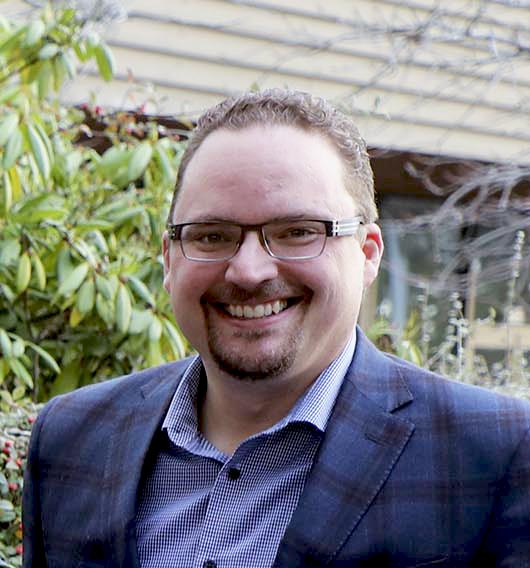
- Strahl in 2017

Official Opposition Critic for Labour
- In office September 8, 2020 – November 9, 2021
- Leader: Erin O'Toole
- Shadowing: Carla Qualtrough
- Succeeded by: Scott Aitchison

Chief Opposition Whip
- In office July 20, 2017 – September 2, 2020
- Leader: Andrew Scheer; Erin O'Toole
- Preceded by: Gord Brown
- Succeeded by: Blake Richards

Official Opposition Critic for Natural Resources
- In office September 15, 2016 – August 29, 2017
- Leader: Rona Ambrose; Andrew Scheer
- Shadowing: Jim Carr
- Preceded by: Candice Bergen
- Succeeded by: Shannon Stubbs

Official Opposition Critic for Fisheries & Oceans
- In office November 20, 2015 – September 14, 2016
- Leader: Rona Ambrose
- Shadowing: Hunter Tootoo; Dominic LeBlanc
- Preceded by: Robert Chisholm
- Succeeded by: Todd Doherty

Member of Parliament for Chilliwack—Hope Chilliwack—Fraser Canyon (2011-2015)
- Incumbent
- Assumed office May 2, 2011
- Preceded by: Chuck Strahl

Personal details
- Born: March 26, 1978 (age 48) Chilliwack, British Columbia
- Party: Conservative
- Relations: Chuck Strahl (father); Deb Strahl (mother)
- Profession: Politician

Mark R. Strahl MP (born March 26, 1978) is a Canadian politician. He is the current Conservative Member of Parliament for the riding of Chilliwack—Hope and was first elected in 2011. Strahl is the son of former Conservative MP and federal Cabinet Minister Chuck Strahl, who was the predecessor of the riding.

== Career ==
Strahl was elected to the House of Commons as a Conservative Party of Canada candidate in the riding of Chilliwack—Fraser Canyon in the 2011 federal election. Following the redistribution of seats, he was re-elected and now serves as the Member of Parliament for Chilliwack—Hope. He was re-elected in 2015, 2019, 2021, and 2025.

Strahl held several positions within Stephen Harper’s government including Parliamentary Secretary to the Minister of Aboriginal Affairs and Northern Development, and BC Caucus Chair. As a Member of the Official Opposition, he served as Chief Opposition Whip from 2017 to 2020. He also held a number of Shadow Cabinet roles, including (but not limited to) portfolios such as Fisheries and Oceans, Natural Resources, Labor, and Transport. Strahl was recently appointed by Pierre Poilievre as the Special Advisor for British Columbia.

== Personal life ==
Strahl was born in Chilliwack, British Columbia, the son of Debra Ann "Deb" (Bateman) and former Conservative MP and federal Cabinet Minister Chuck Strahl, who held the same riding (with adjustments) from 1993 to 2011.

Strahl and his wife have been married since 1999; they have one son. They currently reside in Chilliwack, British Columbia.

== Election results ==
2025 Canadian federal election: Chilliwack—Hope
Party	Candidate	Votes	%	±%	Expenditures
Conservative	Mark Strahl	36,027	54.79	+8.80	$90,994.68
Liberal	Zeeshan Khan	23,254	35.37	+18.25	$34,016.34
New Democratic	Teri Westerby	4,779	7.27	–19.15	$17,752.05
Green	Salina Derish	1,083	1.65	–1.16	none listed
People's	Jeff Galbraith	482	0.73	–6.92	$7,816.44
United	Christopher Adam	129	0.20	–	none listed
Total valid votes/expense limit		65,754	99.54	–	$142,106.97
Total rejected ballots		305	0.46	–0.02	
Turnout		66,059	67.83	+6.75	
Eligible voters		97,390			
Conservative notional hold		Swing		–4.73	
Source: Elections Canada

2021 Canadian federal election: Chilliwack—Hope
Party	Candidate	Votes	%	±%	Expenditures
Conservative	Mark Strahl	23,987	45.99	–3.63	$91,344.54
New Democratic	DJ Pohl	13,927	26.70	+10.04	$41,511.72
Liberal	Kelly Velonis	8,851	16.97	–3.21	$17,745.64
People's	Rob Bogunovic	4,004	7.68	+4.40	none listed
Green	Arthur Green	1,391	2.67	–7.09	$3,746.80
Total valid votes/expense limit		52,160	99.52	–	$114,712.45
Total rejected ballots		250	0.48	+0.06	
Turnout		52,410	61.08	–4.10	
Eligible voters		85,809			
Conservative hold		Swing		–	
Source: Elections Canada

2019 Canadian federal election: Chilliwack—Hope
Party	Candidate	Votes	%	±%	Expenditures
Conservative	Mark Strahl	26,672	49.62	+7.29	$83,272.16
Liberal	Kelly Velonis	10,848	20.18	–13.60	$33,281.74
New Democratic	Heather McQuillan	8,957	16.66	–1.53	$9,116.65
Green	Arthur Green	5,243	9.75	+5.04	$9,533.31
People's	Rob Bogunovic	1,760	3.27	–	$5,190.90
Christian Heritage	Daniel Lamache	202	0.38	–	$2,024.46
Marxist–Leninist	Dorothy-Jean O'Donnell	73	0.14	–0.03	none listed
Total valid votes/expense limit		53,755	99.58	–	$109,082.36
Total rejected ballots		226	0.42	+0.12	
Turnout		53,981	65.18	–4.55	
Eligible voters		82,824			
Conservative hold		Swing		+10.44	
Source: Elections Canada

2015 Canadian federal election: Chilliwack—Hope
Party	Candidate	Votes	%	±%	Expenditures
Conservative	Mark Strahl	21,445	42.33	–17.23	$124,817.44
Liberal	Louis De Jaeger	17,114	33.78	+22.60	$60,637.40
New Democratic	Seonaigh MacPherson	9,218	18.20	–5.30	$33,220.27
Green	Thomas Cheney	2,386	4.71	–0.32	$1,715.67
Libertarian	Alexander Johnson	416	0.82	–	none listed
Marxist–Leninist	Dorothy-Jean O'Donnell	82	0.16	–	none listed
Total valid votes/expense limit		50,661	99.70	–	$204,841.51
Total rejected ballots		154	0.30	–	
Turnout		50,815	69.73	–	
Eligible voters		72,874			
Conservative notional hold		Swing		–19.92	
Source: Elections Canada

2011 Canadian federal election: Chilliwack—Fraser Canyon
Party	Candidate	Votes	%	±%	Expenditures
Conservative	Mark Strahl	28,160	57.20	–5.12	$85,783.33
New Democratic	Gwen O'Mahony	12,691	25.78	+7.02	$24,136.83
Liberal	Diane Janzen	5,320	10.81	+2.29	$64,386.66
Green	Jamie Hoskins	2,706	5.50	–3.27	$1,351.18
Western Block	Clive Edwards	180	0.37	–	none listed
Marxist–Leninist	Dorothy-Jean O'Donnell	173	0.35	+0.11	none listed
Total valid votes/expense limit		49,230	99.69	–	$101,975.64
Total rejected ballots		152	0.31	+0.03	
Turnout		49,382	58.14	+0.62	
Eligible voters		84,930			
Conservative hold		Swing		–6.07	
Source: Elections Canada
