= Alex Moens =

Alexander Moens (born 1959) is a professor of political science at Simon Fraser University in Vancouver and a Senior Fellow at the Fraser Institute in the Centre for Canadian-American Relations. He teaches American foreign policy and the political and security relations between Europe and North America. He is the author of The Foreign Policy of George W. Bush: Values, Strategy, Loyalty (Aldershot, Hampshire: Ashgate Publishing, November 2004) as well as Foreign Policy Under Carter (Boulder: Westview Press, 1990).

His edited and co-edited books are: Disconcerted Europe: The Search for a New Security Architecture (Boulder: Westview Press, 1994), NATO and European Security: Alliance Politics from the Cold War's End to the Age of Terrorism (Westport, Connecticut: Praeger Publishers, 2003), and Foreign Policy Realignment in the Age of Terror (Toronto: Canadian Institute of Strategic Studies, 2003).

Moens has published in numerous Canadian, American and European journals on foreign, security and defence issues, including most recently, "Transatlantic Bipolarity and NATO's Global Role," Journal of Transatlantic Studies, 4, (2) 2006, pp. 241–252 He periodically contributes to U.S., Canadian, and Dutch newspapers. In 2006, Moens published two major papers on Canada—US relations: Mad Cow: A Case Study in Canadian-American Relations," Fraser Institute Digital Publication (www.fraserinstitute.ca), 66p, March 30, 2006, and Achieving Energy Security Through Integrated Canadian-American Markets, Fraser Institute Digital Publication, Vancouver, October 2006, 52pp. (www.fraserinstitute.ca). In 2007 he published: Canadian-American Relations in 2007: Recent Trouble, Current Hope, Future Work," Fraser Institute Digital Publication, 32 pages, May 2007.

Moens served in the Policy Planning Staff of Canada's Foreign Affairs Department in 1992 and was a visiting fellow at the National Defense University in Washington, D.C. in 1999. He is also a researcher with the Council For Canadian Security in the 21st Century, and a Fellow of the Canadian Defence & Foreign Affairs Institute.
