= William Harold Hicks =

Canadian politician

Member of Parliament for Fraser Valley
- In office March 1958 – June 1962

Personal details
- Born: 12 November 1888 Lauder, Manitoba, Canada
- Died: 14 May 1974 (aged 85) Chilliwack, British Columbia, Canada
- Party: Progressive Conservative
- Profession: agrologist

William Harold Hicks (12 November 1888 – 14 May 1974) was a Progressive Conservative party member of the House of Commons of Canada. He was born in Lauder, Manitoba and became an agrologist by career.

He was first elected at the Fraser Valley riding in the 1958 general election, but defeated in the 1962 and 1963 general elections. He served only one term, the 24th Parliament.
