= Ervin Pringle =

Canadian politician

Maurice Ervin Pringle

Member of Parliament for Fraser Valley East
- In office June 1968 – September 1972

Personal details
- Born: 8 November 1910 Dugald, Manitoba, Canada
- Died: 9 February 1991 (aged 80) White Rock, British Columbia, Canada
- Party: Liberal
- Profession: business consultant, director, hatcheryman

Maurice Ervin "Jerry" Pringle (8 November 1910 – 9 February 1991) was a Liberal party member of the House of Commons of Canada. Born in Dugald, Manitoba, he was a business consultant, director and hatcheryman by career.

He was first elected at the Fraser Valley East riding in the 1968 general election and served only one term, the 28th Canadian Parliament, before being defeated at the riding in the 1972 and 1974 elections.
