= William Donnelly =

William Donnelly or Willie Donnelly may refer to:

- William Ewart Donnelly, New Zealand schoolteacher
- William J. S. Donnelly (1844–1914), Newfoundland politician
- William M. Donnelly (1885–1946), American politician in Michigan
- William Donnelly (1845–1897), member of the Black Donnellys
- Willie Donnelly (footballer) (1872–1934), Irish footballer
- Willie Donnelly (hurler), Irish hurler
- William Donnelly, Scottish artist and archaeologist

== Fictional ==
- Will Donnelly, character on television series Love Is a Many Splendored Thing
