= Jimmy Donnelly (footballer) =

English footballer

Personal information
- Full name: James Donnelly
- Date of birth: 1879
- Place of birth: South Bank, England
- Position: Winger

Senior career*
Years	Team	Apps	(Gls)
1900–1901	South Bank		
1900–1901	Darlington St Augustine's		
1902–1907	Sheffield United	89	(24)
1907–1910	Leicester Fosse	74	(26)
1910	Darlington		
Total		163	(50)
- * Club domestic league appearances and goals

James Donnelly (1879–unknown) was an English footballer who played in the Football League for Leicester Fosse and Sheffield United.
