= Chilliwack—Fraser Canyon =

Former federal electoral district in British Columbia, Canada

Coordinates: 50.4°N 121.9°W

British Columbia electoral district
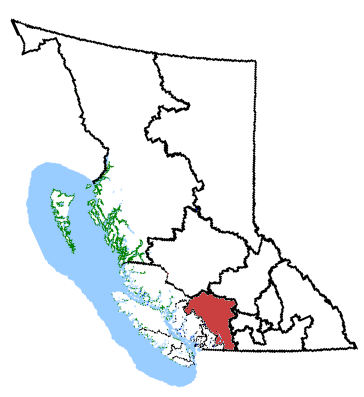
- Chilliwack-Fraser Canyon in relation to other British Columbia federal electoral districts

Defunct federal electoral district
- Legislature: House of Commons
- District created: 2003
- District abolished: 2013
- First contested: 2004
- Last contested: 2011
- District webpage: profile, map

Demographics
- Population (2011): 121,737
- Electors (2011): 81,677
- Area (km²): 29,553.57
- Census subdivision(s): Chilliwack, Hope, Kent, Fraser Valley E, Lillooet, Pemberton

Chilliwack-Fraser Canyon was a federal electoral district in the province of British Columbia, Canada, that was represented in the House of Commons of Canada from 2004 to 2015.

== Geography ==
The district includes the City of Chilliwack, the Districts of Hope and Kent (which includes the town of Agassiz, the small towns along the Fraser Canyon north to and including the Village of Lytton and the District of Lillooet, plus the rural settlements and mountain towns of the Bridge River Country.

== History ==
The electoral district was created in 2003 principally from Fraser Valley riding with additional parts from Cariboo—Chilcotin, Pitt Meadows—Maple Ridge—Mission, Okanagan—Coquihalla and West Vancouver—Sunshine Coast.

The 2012 electoral redistribution dissolved this riding into Chilliwack—Hope and Mission—Matsqui—Fraser Canyon, with a small portion going to West Vancouver—Sunshine Coast—Sea to Sky Country. This came into effect for the 2015 election.

=== Members of Parliament ===
Chilliwack—Fraser Canyon
Parliament	Years	Member	Party
Riding created from Fraser Valley, Cariboo—Chilcotin, Pitt Meadows—Maple Ridge—Mission, Okanagan—Coquihalla and West Vancouver—Sunshine Coast
38th	2004–2006	Chuck Strahl	Conservative
39th	2006–2008	Chuck Strahl	Conservative
40th	2008–2011	Chuck Strahl	Conservative
41st	2011–2015	Mark Strahl	Conservative
Riding dissolved into Chilliwack—Hope, Mission—Matsqui—Fraser Canyon and West Vancouver—Sunshine Coast—Sea to Sky Country

== Election results ==
2011 Canadian federal election
Party	Candidate	Votes	%	±%	Expenditures
Conservative	Mark Strahl	28,160	57.20	–5.12	$85,783.33
New Democratic	Gwen O'Mahony	12,691	25.78	+7.02	$24,136.83
Liberal	Diane Janzen	5,320	10.81	+2.29	$64,386.66
Green	Jamie Hoskins	2,706	5.50	–3.27	$1,351.18
Western Block	Clive Edwards	180	0.37	–	none listed
Marxist–Leninist	Dorothy-Jean O'Donnell	173	0.35	+0.11	none listed
Total valid votes/expense limit		49,230	99.69	–	$101,975.64
Total rejected ballots		152	0.31	+0.03	
Turnout		49,382	58.14	+0.62	
Eligible voters		84,930			
Conservative hold		Swing		–6.07	
Source: Elections Canada

2008 Canadian federal election
Party	Candidate	Votes	%	±%	Expenditures
Conservative	Chuck Strahl	29,198	62.32	+6.33	$50,363.88
New Democratic	Helen Kormendy	8,791	18.76	–2.13	$15,291.01
Green	Barbara Lebeau	4,107	8.77	+4.74	$1,138.94
Liberal	Myra Sweeney	3,990	8.52	–8.39	$484.27
Christian Heritage	Harold J. Ludwig	653	1.39	–0.56	$10,242.87
Marxist–Leninist	Dorothy-Jean O'Donnell	113	0.24	+0.00	none listed
Total valid votes/expense limit		46,852	99.73	–	$97,307.19
Total rejected ballots		129	0.27	–0.00	
Turnout		46,981	57.52	–5.30	
Eligible voters		81,677			
Conservative hold		Swing		+4.23	
Source: Elections Canada

2006 Canadian federal election
Party	Candidate	Votes	%	±%	Expenditures
Conservative	Chuck Strahl	26,842	55.99	+2.32	$73,315.08
New Democratic	Malcolm James	10,015	20.89	+0.30	$17,607.95
Liberal	Myra Sweeney	8,106	16.91	–1.47	$6,640.43
Green	Ed Baye	1,929	4.02	+0.80	$15.00
Christian Heritage	Ron Gray	935	1.95	–0.63	$14,108.38
Marxist–Leninist	Dorothy-Jean O'Donnell	114	0.24	+0.03	none listed
Total valid votes/expense limit		47,941	99.72	–	$88,254.37
Total rejected ballots		134	0.28	+0.05	
Turnout		48,075	62.83	+1.01	
Eligible voters		76,522			
Conservative hold		Swing		+1.31	
Source: Elections Canada

2004 Canadian federal election
Party	Candidate	Votes	%	±%	Expenditures
Conservative	Chuck Strahl	24,096	53.68	–	$61,610.17
New Democratic	Rollie Keith	9,244	20.59	–	$15,156.73
Liberal	Bob Besner	8,249	18.38	–	$22,151.65
Green	Aisha Coghlan	1,449	3.23	–	none listed
Christian Heritage	Ron Gray	1,156	2.58	–	$23,859.51
Marijuana	Norm Siefken	603	1.34	–	none listed
Marxist–Leninist	Dorothy-Jean O'Donnell	95	0.21	–	$173.83
Total valid votes/expense limit		44,892	99.78	–	$84,597.43
Total rejected ballots		101	0.22	–	
Turnout		44,993	61.82	–	
Eligible voters		72,782			
Conservative notional hold		Swing		–	
This riding was created from parts of Fraser Valley, Cariboo—Chilcotin, Pitt Meadows—Maple Ridge—Mission, Okanagan—Coquihalla and West Vancouver—Sunshine Coast, all of which elected a Canadian Alliance member in the last election. Chuck Strahl was the incumbent from Fraser Valley.
Source: Elections Canada

== See also ==
- List of Canadian electoral districts
- Historical federal electoral districts of Canada
