= Brian Donnelly =

Brian Donnelly may refer to:

- Brian Donnelly (hurler) (born 1961), Irish retired hurler
- Brian Donnelly (New Zealand politician) (1949–2008), member of the New Zealand First party
- Brian Donnelly (British diplomat), retired United Kingdom diplomat
- Brian J. Donnelly (1946–2023), U.S. Representative from Massachusetts, 1979–1993
- Bryan Donnelly (rower) (born 1975), Canadian Olympic rower
- Kaws (Brian Donnelly, born 1974), American artist and designer
