= Ross Belsher =

Canadian politician

Member of Parliament for Fraser Valley East
- In office 4 September 1984 – 25 October 1993
- Preceded by: Alexander Bell Patterson
- Succeeded by: Chuck Strahl

Personal details
- Born: Douglas Ross Belsher; 19 January 1933; Kincaid, Saskatchewan, Canada
- Died: 12 December 2003 (aged 70); Abbotsford, British Columbia, Canada
- Political party: Progressive Conservative
- Education: University of Saskatchewan

Douglas Ross Belsher (19 January 1933 – 12 December 2003) was a Canadian politician and businessman who served as a member of the House of Commons of Canada. His career included managing Eaton's stores at various British Columbia locations.

== Early life ==
Belsher was born in Kincaid, Saskatchewan, and raised on his family's farm in McCord. He graduated from Luther College and earned a diploma from the University of Saskatchewan College of Agriculture.

== Career ==
Belsher represented the British Columbia riding of Fraser Valley East where he was first elected in the 1984 federal election and re-elected in 1988, becoming a member in the 33rd and 34th Canadian Parliaments. During his tenure, he also served as parliamentary secretary to the minister of fisheries and oceans.

Belsher left federal politics in the 1993 federal election when he was defeated by Chuck Strahl of the Reform Party of Canada.

== Personal life ==
Belsher died of cancer at the Abbotsford Regional Hospital and Cancer Centre in 2003. He was a member of the Alliance World Fellowship, an evangelical denomination.
