= Elgin Albert Munro =

Canadian politician

Member of Parliament for Fraser Valley
- In office December 1921 – September 1925
- Preceded by: riding created
- Succeeded by: Harry James Barber

Personal details
- Born: Elgin Albert Munro; 11 October 1874 Iroquois, Ontario, Canada
- Died: 17 June 1931 (aged 56)
- Party: Liberal
- Profession: Farmer

Elgin Albert Munro (11 October 1874 – 17 June 1931) was a Liberal party member of the House of Commons of Canada. He was born in Iroquois, Ontario, and became a farmer.

He was elected to Parliament at the Fraser Valley riding in the 1921 general election. After serving his only federal term, the 14th Canadian Parliament, Munro was defeated by Harry James Barber of the Conservatives in the 1925 federal election.
