= John Donnelly (ice hockey) =

Canadian ice hockey player (born 1948)

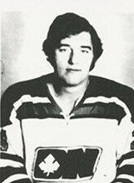
- Donnelly in 1972 photo
- Born: September 28, 1948 (age 77) Montreal, Quebec, Canada
- Height: 6 ft 0 in (183 cm)
- Weight: 195 lb (88 kg; 13 st 13 lb)
- Position: Defence
- Played for: WHA; Ottawa Nationals; EHL; Clinton Comets; NAHL; Broome Dusters; Mohawk Valley Comets
- NHL draft: Undrafted
- Playing career: 1972–1975

John Donnelly (born September 28, 1948) is a Canadian former professional ice hockey defenceman. During the 1972–73 season, Donnelly played 15 games in the World Hockey Association with the Ottawa Nationals.

== Career statistics ==
=== Regular season and playoffs ===
			Regular season					Playoffs
Season	Team	League	GP	G	A	Pts	PIM	GP	G	A	Pts	PIM
1972–73	Clinton Comets	EHL	55	8	20	28	62	—	—	—	—	—
1972–73	Ottawa Nationals	WHA	15	1	1	2	44	—	—	—	—	—
1973–74	Broome County Dusters	NAHL	29	2	7	9	40	—	—	—	—	—
1973–74	Mohawk Valley Comets	NAHL	25	4	14	18	64	—	—	—	—	—
1974–75	Broome County Dusters	NAHL	44	4	20	24	39	12	3	5	8	17
WHA totals			15	1	1	2	44	–	–	–	–	–
