= Dan Donnelly =

Dan Donnelly may refer to:

- Dan Donnelly (boxer) (1788–1820), Irish-born heavyweight champion
- Dan Donnelly (singer) (born 1974), Irish singer-songwriter
- Danny Donnelly, founder of drum and bass/rave label Suburban Base Records
- Danny Donnelly (politician), Northern Irish politician
