= RDI Video Systems =

American video game developer

- Type: Incentive Corporation Limited
- Industry: Video game industry
- Founded: 1982
- Founder: Rick Dyer
- Defunct: 1985
- Fate: Bankrupt
- Products: Games; Halcyon

RDI Video Systems (Rick Dyer Industries) was a video game company founded by Rick Dyer originally as Advanced Microcomputer Systems, and was well known for its Laserdisc video games, beginning with the immensely popular Dragon's Lair. The company went bankrupt shortly after completing, but before releasing, the Halcyon gaming console.

== History ==
Rick Dyer initially experimented with interactive novel games "in the early 1980s" and decided to use a "LaserDisc player in an arcade machine" after witnessing a 1982 Amusement & Music Operators Association trade show "demo of Sega's LaserDisc game Astron Belt". He also saw Don Bluth's The Secret of NIMH (1982) which led Dyer "to draft in Bluth's company to do the animation for what would become Dragon's Lair" (1983) for his "newly formed" company Advanced Microcomputer Systems. The game was unlike other arcade games and was an "instant success". While it was considered "expensive, at 50 cents a play," Dragon's Lair "generated $48 million in revenue and was the top arcade game of 1983". Following this, Dyer and Bluth developed their next arcade game Space Ace (1984). Dryer also renamed Advanced Microcomputer Systems to "RDI Video Systems, with the RDI standing for 'Rick Dyer Industries', and formed plans to go beyond the arcade".

RDI Video Systems went on to develop the Halcyon gaming console for home entertainment. Simone de Rochefort, for Polygon in 2018, noted that this console "came on the heels of Dyer's success with the one-two punch of Dragon's Lair and Space Ace. These laserdisc arcade games stunned people because they looked like movies and played like – well, a series of stressful quick-time events that made players suffer". In 1984, for the Colorado Springs Gazette, Jonathan Greer highlighted the "novel" Halcyon which attracted a lot of visibility and "enthusiasm" at the Consumer Electronics Show, noting that "Dyer says the problem he's facing is not generating interest, 'it's how to control the growth'". Greer also commented that regardless of the attention the Halcyon received, "the ups-and-downs of the $33 billion consumer electronics industry mean that there's no guarantee it will be a bigger hit than any of the dozens of other new products introduced at the show". John Free, for Popular Science in May 1985, highlighted that "most U.S. homes these days have VCRs, not laser video machines, so few interactive videodiscs for home use are available", however, RDI Video Systems was "attempting to change that" with their upcoming "voice-actuated computer" Halcyon.

However, RDI Video Systems went bankrupt around the planned 1985 launch of Halcyon. The home video game industry had crashed in 1983, and by "1985, a once billion-dollar industry would be valued at just $100 million". The Halcyon, with an estimated $2,500 price tag and costly production requirements, failed to attract enough investor confidence or consumer interest and "RDI's financiers pulled out". The company folded before the console was released.

== Games ==
- Zzyzzyxx (1982)
- Dragon's Lair (1983)
- Space Ace (1984)
- Thayer's Quest (1984) (Originally for the Halcyon, and later released in arcades)
- NFL Football (1985) (Originally for the Halcyon, and later released in arcades)
- Orpheus, not released
- The Spirits of Whittier Mansion, not released
- The Shadow of the Stars, not released
- Voyage to the New World, not released
- Dallas vs. Washington, not released
