= Seamus Donnelly =

Seamus Donnelly is the name of:

- Seamus Donnelly (footballer), Irish retired professional footballer
- Seamus Donnelly (IRA), member of the Provisional IRA
