= Martin Donnelly =

Martin Donnelly may refer to:

- Martin Donnelly (civil servant) (born 1958), former Permanent Secretary of the Department for Business, Innovation and Skills in the UK
- Martin Donnelly (sportsman) (1917–1999), sportsman who represented New Zealand at cricket and England at rugby union
- Martin Donnelly (footballer, born 1951), Northern Irish footballer active in the NASL in the 1970s and 1980s
- Martin Donnelly (footballer, born 1988), Northern Irish footballer who plays for Cliftonville
- Martin Donnelly (racing driver) (born 1964), Northern Irish racing driver
