= Tim Donnelly =

Tim Donnelly may refer to:

- Tim Donnelly (actor) (1944–2021), American actor
- Tim Donnelly (politician) (born 1966), American politician, member of Republican Party
- Tim Donnelly (baseball) (born 1980), American baseball coach
- Tim Donnelly (rugby union) (born 1980), rugby player in Australia

== See also ==
- Timothy Donnelly (born 1969), American poet
