= Journal of Transatlantic Studies =

- Discipline: International Relations Transatlantic relations
- Language: English

Publication details
- History: 2002-now
- Publisher: Routledge for the Transatlantic Studies Association
- Frequency: quarterly

Standard abbreviations
- ISO 4: J. Transatl. Stud.

Indexing
- ISSN: 1479-4012 (print); 1754-1018 (web)

Links
- Journal homepage

The Journal of Transatlantic Studies (JTS) is a multi-disciplinary, peer-reviewed academic journal that covers all aspects pertaining to transatlantic relations.

The Journal of Transatlantic Studies is the official publication of the Transatlantic Studies Association (TSA) and is the only scholarly journal dedicated to the study of transatlantic relations. It approaches this subject from an explicitly multi-disciplinary perspective and covers the following range of subjects:

- Political science
- Comparative constitutionalism
- International relations
- Security studies
- History
- Literature and culture
- Geography and population studies
- Planning and environment

The Journal of Transatlantic Studies not only seeks to study Euro-American relations, but also issues relating to interactions between Europe and Latin America.

Prof. Alan P. Dobson (University of Swansea) is currently the editor. The Journal of Transatlantic Studies is published quarterly by Taylor and Francis.
