= Pat Donnelly (ice hockey, born 1942) =

Canadian ice hockey player

- Born: September 28, 1942 (age 83) Kincaid, Saskatchewan, Canada
- Height: 5 ft 10 in (178 cm)
- Weight: 165 lb (75 kg; 11 st 11 lb)
- Position: Left wing
- Shot: Left
- Played for: EHL; Nashville Dixie Flyers; Jersey Devils; IHL; Dayton Gems; Toledo Blades; Des Moines Oak Leafs
- Playing career: 1963–1972

Pat Donnelly (born September 28, 1942) is a Canadian former professional ice hockey player.

== Early life ==
Donnelly was born in Kincaid, Saskatchewan. He played four seasons of junior hockey (1959–1963) in the Saskatchewan Junior Hockey League with the Prince Albert Mintos and the Estevan Bruins.

== Career ==
Known as an “excellent back-checker and a tough forward”, Donnelly started his professional career in the Eastern Hockey League (EHL), playing the 1963–64 season with the Nashville Dixie Flyers, and continued the next season in the EHL with the Jersey Devils, before moving to join the Dayton Gems of the International Hockey League (IHL) mid-way through the 1964–65 season. He stayed with the Gems for three seasons, before being traded to the Toledo Blades in exchange for Don Westbrooke prior to the 1967–68 season. Donnelly also played three seasons (1967–1970) with the Des Moines Oak Leafs of the IHL.
