= Halcyon (console) =

Home video game console by RDI Video Systems

- Manufacturer: RDI Video Systems
- Type: Home video game console
- Generation: Third
- Released: Unreleased
- Introductory price: US$1800–2500
- Media: LaserDisc (video); ROM cartridge (game program)
- CPU: Zilog Z80
- Sound: Votrax Speech Synthesizer

The Halcyon is a home video game console produced by RDI Video Systems. The system was planned to be released in January 1985, with the initial retail price for the system being US$2,500 (equivalent to $7,484 in 2025). Fewer than a dozen units are known to exist and it never reached most retailers because of a lack of affordable disc players. The design featured a LaserDisc player and an attached computer, each the size of an early-model VCR. Of the six games planned, only two games were released: Thayer's Quest and NFL Football LA Raiders vs SD Chargers. RDI Video Systems claimed that the system would be entirely voice-activated, and would have an artificial intelligence akin to HAL 9000 from 2001: A Space Odyssey.

== History ==
Rick Dyer was one of the many fans of the interactive fiction game, Adventure, and wanted to develop his own game, Shadoan, which was an expansive fantasy game inspired by The Lord of the Rings. System costs were intended to range from $1,800 to $2,100 (equivalent to $5,388 to $6,286 in 2025), depending on the model.

Although there wasn't a nationwide release, a few consoles were sold at Beverly Stereo and Video for $2,498 and later on clearance for $999. It was sold at Video Scene in San Diego, California for $1,898.

The console is on display at the National Videogame Museum in Frisco, Texas.

== Technical details ==
=== Hardware ===
Halcyon was based around the Z80 microprocessor, with its 64K memory partitioned out to ROM and RAM. A separate speech recognition computer provided the additional power needed to recognize human speech. Its firmware was proprietary, and its chief communications with the Z80 were indications of what word it had recognized, and what probability of confidence it calculated for the match. Other functions this subsystem provided were non-volatile memory storage, and speech recognition training.

Video content existed on a special computer-controlled CED player provided by RCA. Because of video encoding and stylus positioning constraints inherent in this technology, still frames (where action would be suspended pending player input) had to be encoded as a repeat of 2 or 3 seconds of video. Late in its development, Halcyon had to be re-designed to use Laserdisc players because CED units were put out of production by RCA. The Laserdisc player used by Halcyon was an unbadged unit made by Pioneer Corporation.

Communications with CED players were serial. Communications with Laserdisc players were via infrared LED attached via suction cup.

Speech synthesis was produced using a licensed text-to-speech algorithm included as part of the base Halcyon Operating System, including a special English vocabulary which would correctly pronounce hundreds of proper names. The phonetic output of this algorithm was fed into a Votrax chip.

=== Software ===
Firmware unique to the game being played existed as a removable ROM cartridge containing 16K memory, including the entire game node layout, vocabulary of the game (both for the speech synthesizer and speech recognizer), inventory data (both for gameplay as well as video still frames depicting items), and certain executable data sections to assist in the processing of game flow.

Save for the words "Yes" and "No", Halcyon required each player to train it to recognize their voice. The words "Yes" and "No" existed as four samples of human voices pre-loaded into memory, two female and two male. Each voice was selected for their unique pitch and timbre properties. These four gave a high probability match for Halcyon to recognize from any given English speaker.

Speech recognition was discontiguous, meaning the player had only a few seconds to speak into a headset when prompted. This headset was equipped with a noise-canceling microphone to help isolate speech from any other sounds. Speech samples would be compared against allowed responses, and a match, along with probability of accuracy, would be sent to the Halcyon main processor.

To acknowledge voice commands, Halcyon would reiterate what it believed it "heard" the player say. This sometimes resulted in incorrect actions taken, especially if the player had a significantly different inflection or spoke something different from the choices expected. Probability ranking could trigger Halcyon to ask the player to repeat their choice when it received a poor match to all expected responses. Mis-recognitions were chiefly the result of a sample of speech given sufficient probability to match one of the anticipated words or phrases.

Halcyon was intended to have a voice much like the HAL 9000, but memory constraints prohibited the use of tailored speech parameters for the Votrax synthesizer that was built into the console. The compromise was to use a licensed text-to-speech algorithm that had several built-in rules for pronouncing English text properly. Modified spellings were also used where needed to correct pronunciation issues, though this did not apply to words such as user names typed by the player.

A video game would follow a general design of "nodes", which interconnected based on responses and lack of responses from a player. Certain triggers, such as a real-time constraint under which the game would be interrupted if its associated event did not occur, were also part of the game's dynamic.

Scenes existed as two or more scripts: One for the "normal" or first encounter with the scene, one for subsequent visits, and optionally one or two for where certain actions required the scene animation or graphics to deviate, usually where an item has been removed or used.

A scene had to be identical in animation and graphics between its normal and subsequent visit, differing only in the audio track used. For this reason, lip sync typically could not be used, often resulting in speaking characters having their mouths obscured or speaking with their backs turned.

A scene with an item used or removed would have separate animation and graphics, allowing for 2 additional audio tracks, again without lip sync.

Audio tracks were encoded into the left and right channels of a stereo encoding; therefore, only monaural audio would be played from any given instance of a scene.

Almost all scenes in a game would have some information revealed that would contribute to solving the puzzle of obtaining the final goal of the game. Since Halcyon needed to keep track of first versus subsequent visits, a count of visits (up to a maximum of 15) would be used to trigger its speech synthesized hints and comments. One example from Thayer's Quest would be the direct instruction to take the right door when the wrong door (leading to instant death) was chosen more than once.

To break up the monotony of robotic speech, Halcyon was given prompt and response phrases that had markers that would include interchangeable words and phrases, along with the player's name, which it would include occasionally. "Enter your name on my keyboard" and "Please spell your name" would be two examples of phrases it would use to prompt the player.

Halcyon's game authoring method would easily accommodate playing Dragon's Lair, except for the restraint that speech recognition would take too long to process each move before the time allowed would expire, limiting it to keyboard-only use. This game's inclusion was not considered for this reason as well as license restrictions.

Each player's game record was represented in non-volatile memory as the set of items they had in their inventory, the visit counters of all possible nodes in the game (unvisited nodes having a count of zero), the scene toggle information (item used / taken / etc.), applicable timers (real-time events would suspend when games were saved), and their trained speech sampled data. To resume play, all one had to do was speak their name when asked to do so by Halcyon.

=== Games ===
- Thayer's Quest
- NFL Football: Chargers vs. Raiders
- Voyage to the New World (Unreleased)
- Shadow of the Stars (Unreleased)
- Orpheus (Unreleased)
- The Spirit of the Whittier Mansion (Unreleased)
