= Jon L. Belsher =

American physician, former chief of aerospace medicine

- Born: California, U.S.
- Education: Amherst College; University of Arizona; University of Texas Southwestern Medical School
- Occupation: Physician
- Years active: 1998–present
- Known for: Special Representative in White House
- Website: jonbelsher.com

Jon L. Belsher is an American physician and health executive. He is the founder and current chief executive officer (CEO) of Visura. Previously, he served as president and CEO of UCI Medical Affiliates.

Belsher served as a political aide for the White House during the George W. Bush administration.

== Early life and education ==
Belsher was born in California. He attended Amherst College and the University of Arizona and later earned his Doctor of Medicine from the University of Texas Southwestern Medical School in 1998. He completed residencies in family medicine and internal medicine at Mayo Clinic Scottsdale, followed by a fellowship in critical care medicine at Mayo Clinic in Rochester.

== Career ==
During his early career, Belsher served as chief of aerospace medicine for the Arizona Air National Guard's 162nd Fighter Wing and, as a lieutenant colonel, acted as second-in-command of an Air National Guard Medical Group.

In 2011, Belsher helped found MedSpring Urgent Care. He served as chief medical officer. As part of MedSpring, he facilitated public shift towards affordable urgent care instead of hospital emergency rooms. As chief medical officer, he helped expand MedSpring in Illinois.

Belsher has been a member of the Healthcare Summit at Jackson Hole since 2023.

== Publications ==
- Belsher, Jon L.; Gay, Peter; Brinton, Margo; DellaValla, Joseph; Ridenour, Robert; Lanciotti, Robert; Perelygin, Andrey; Zaki, Sherif; Paddock, Christopher; Querec, Troy; Zhu, Tuofu; Pulendran, Bali; Eidex, Rachel B.; Hayes, Edward (5 December 2007). "Fatal multiorgan failure due to yellow fever vaccine-associated viscerotropic disease". Vaccine. 25 (50): 8480–8485. doi:10.1016/j.vaccine.2007.08.061. PMC 7115366. PMID 18023511.
- Khan, Hasrat; Belsher, Jon; Yilmaz, Murat; Afessa, Bekele; Winters, Jeffrey L.; Moore, S. Breanndan; Hubmayr, Rolf D.; Gajic, Ognjen (May 2007). "Fresh-Frozen Plasma and Platelet Transfusions Are Associated With Development of Acute Lung Injury in Critically Ill Medical Patients". Chest. 131 (5): 1308–1314. doi:10.1378/chest.06-3048. PMID 17400669.
- Rehman, Ahmer; Iscimen, Remzi; Yilmaz, Murat; Khan, Hasrat; Belsher, Jon; Gomez, Javier Fernandez; Hanson, Andrew C.; Afessa, Bekele; Baron, Todd H.; Gajic, Ognjen (June 2009). "Prophylactic endotracheal intubation in critically ill patients undergoing endoscopy for upper GI hemorrhage". Gastrointestinal Endoscopy. 69 (7): e55–e59. doi:10.1016/j.gie.2009.03.002. PMC 2737482. PMID 19481643.
