= John Donnelly (whaler) =

New Zealand whaler and gold prospector

- Born: c. 1822; London, England
- Died: 3 June 1904
- Occupations: Whaler, gold prospector
- Known for: Early whaling and gold prospecting activities in New Zealand

John Donnelly (c. 1822 – 3 June 1904) was a New Zealand whaler and gold prospector. He was born in London, England.
