= Saskatchewan Transportation Company =

Former Saskatchewan Crown corporation

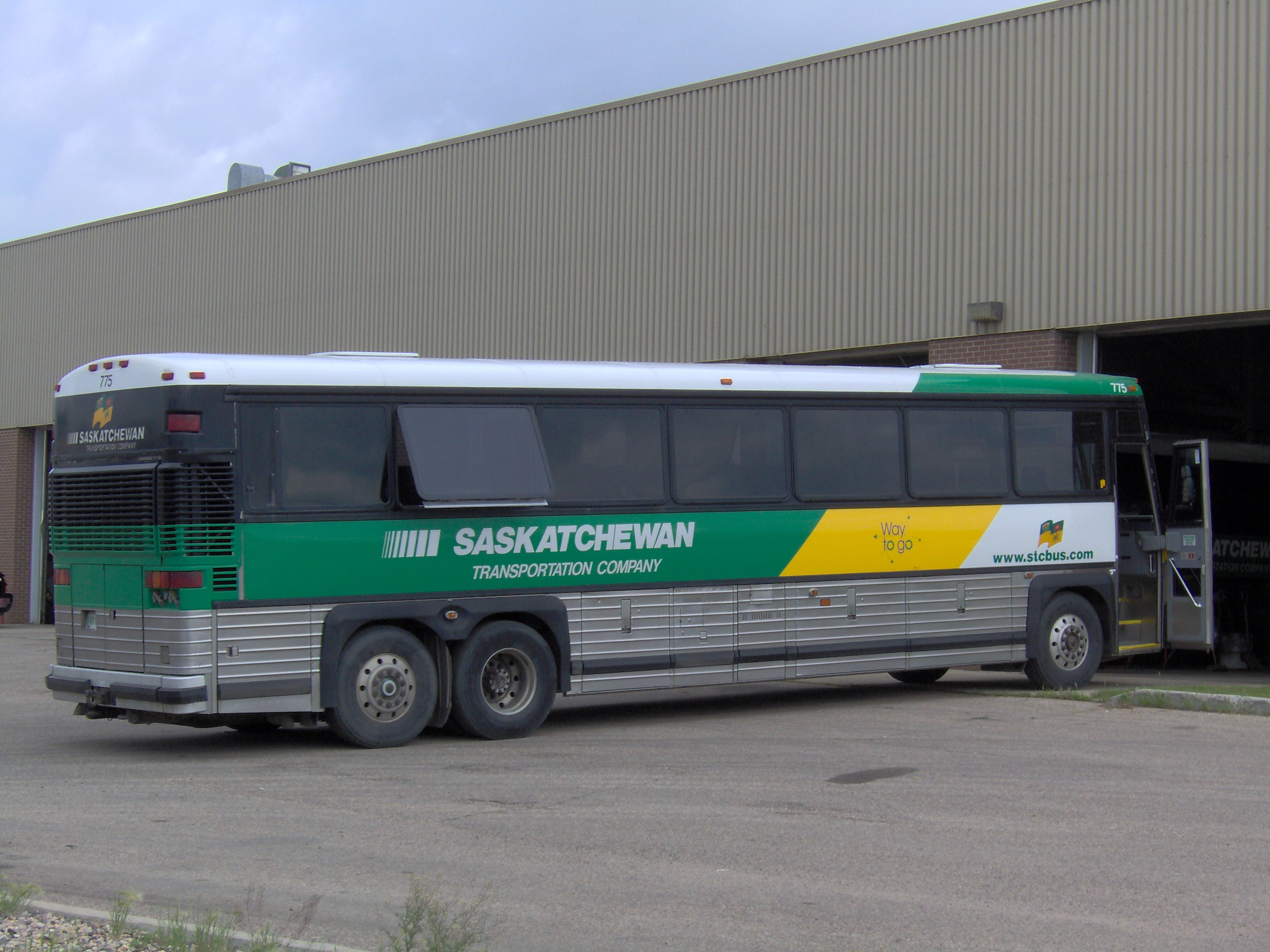
- An MCI bus being serviced in Saskatoon
- Parent: Crown Investments Corporation of Saskatchewan
- Founded: 1946
- Ceased operation: May 31, 2017
- Headquarters: 1717 Saskatchewan Drive; Regina, Saskatchewan
- Service area: Saskatchewan
- Service type: bus service, bus charter and bus parcel express
- Routes: 27
- Destinations: Over 250
- Stations: Over 170
- Fleet: Over 40
- Website: www.stcbus.com

The Saskatchewan Transportation Company (STC) was a Crown corporation in the Canadian province of Saskatchewan responsible for operating intercity bus routes in the province from 1946 to 2017. Created in 1946 by an Order in Council giving the company a mandate to provide service between major urban centres and to as much of the rural population as possible, STC was a wholly owned subsidiary of the Crown Investments Corporation of Saskatchewan.

The government of Saskatchewan announced on March 22, 2017 that it planned to shut down STC by the end of May 2017. Freight services were terminated effective May 19, and passenger services were terminated effective May 31.

== Facilities ==
STC owned and operated bus depots in Regina, Saskatoon, and Prince Albert. It also had numerous ticket agencies in communities throughout the province and served as an agent for Greyhound tickets at many of its locations. Since the closure of STC and the discontinuation of Greyhound Canada service, these facilities have since been redeveloped for other uses such as offices and retail.

=== Regina Terminal ===
Address: 1717 Saskatchewan Drive, Regina
Coordinates: 50°27′06″N 104°36′19″W
Facility includes: Head office, STC bus station, STC freight terminal, Greyhound Canada service, Robin's Donuts
Opened: October 8, 2008

=== Saskatoon Terminal ===
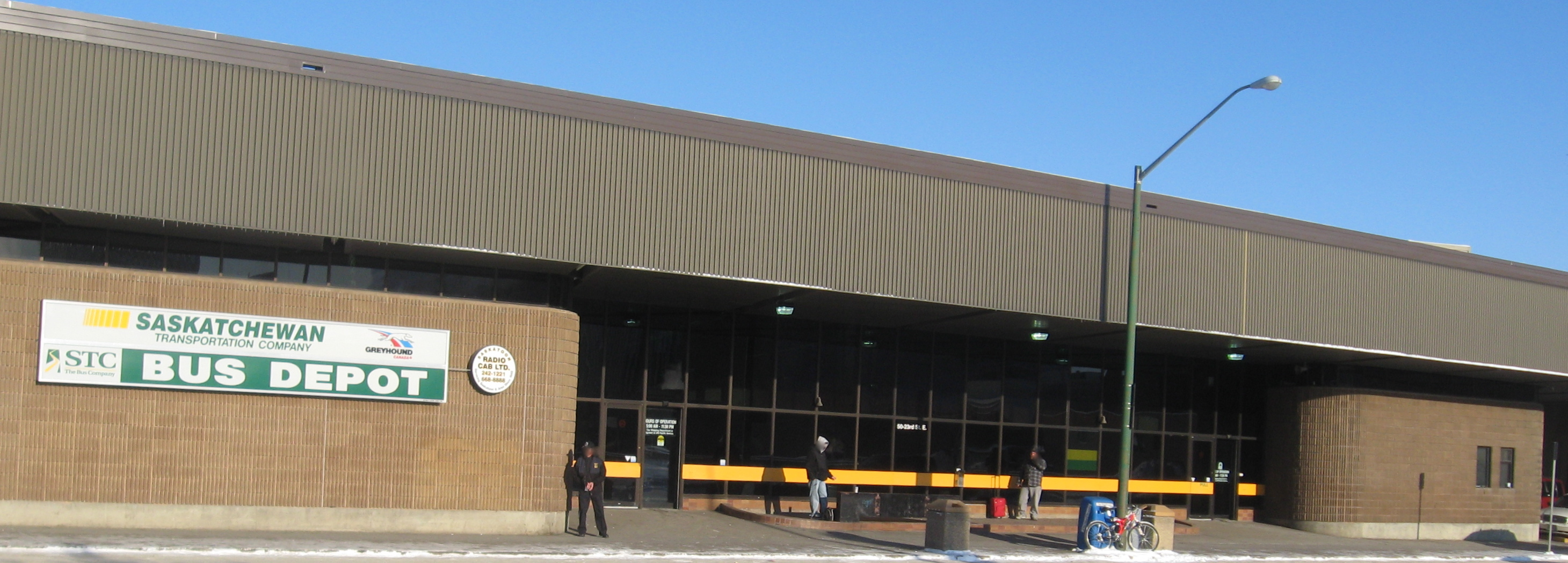
Saskatoon Depot

Address: 50 – 23rd Street East, Saskatoon
Coordinates: 52°07′52″N 106°40′02″W
Facility includes: STC bus station, STC freight terminal, Greyhound Canada service, Robin's Donuts

=== Prince Albert Terminal ===
Address: 99 – 15th Street East, Prince Albert
Coordinates: 53°11′57″N 105°45′06″W
Facility includes: STC bus station, STC freight terminal, Greyhound Canada service

=== Agencies ===
The Saskatchewan Transportation Company worked with over 170 private companies within the province to provide local passenger and express depots to rural communities. These locations were referred to as agencies and made up the ground work by which STC was able to provide service to the people of Saskatchewan.

== Services ==
=== Maintenance ===
The Saskatchewan Transportation Company operated maintenance facilities in Regina and Saskatoon, which allowed for the efficient operation of their fleet and provided an array of services to foreign fleet customers.

==== Saskatoon Bus Service Centre ====
Address: 88 King Street, Saskatoon
Coordinates: 52°08′21″N 106°39′47″W

==== Regina Bus Maintenance Centre ====
Address: 9th Avenue and Wallace Street, Regina
Coordinates: 50°27′14″N 104°35′38″W

=== Passenger ===
STC operated a number of routes to both urban and rural communities across Saskatchewan. Many STC passenger coaches were wheelchair accessible and all were Wi-Fi equipped.

=== Express ===
STC had a history of package delivery across Saskatchewan. Many people relied on STC to transport packages, parcels, and equipment to rural areas. While providing overnight service to many locations, STC also provided customers with door-to-door pick-up and delivery in major centres.

=== Charter ===
STC provided charter services to a number of groups and organizations every year in Saskatchewan. Many corporations, sports teams, and clubs chose STC when travelling to functions both in and out of province. Charters were available any day of the week and for various lengths of time subject to availability.

== Employees ==
STC employed over 230 people. All In Scope employees were members of the Amalgamated Transit Union.

== Closure and sale of assets ==
The provincial government shut down STC in 2017 as part of spending cutbacks. Ridership had decreased 77 percent since its peak in 1980, and only two of its 27 routes turned a profit. The opposition NDP criticized the shutdown, saying it would hurt rural residents who relied upon the service for parcel delivery and transportation for medical appointments in larger centres.

The company's assets were sold for $29 million, slightly more than their appraised value of $25.7 million (CAD).
