= 1967 in animation =

Events in 1967 in animation.

== Events ==
=== January ===
- January 20: Chuck Jones' Tom and Jerry cartoon Cat and Dupli-cat premieres.
- January 21: Robert McKimson's Speedy Gonzales and Daffy Duck cartoon Daffy's Diner premieres, this was the final Looney Tunes/Merrie Melodies short to be produced by DePatie–Freleng Enterprises & the final Speedy and Daffy short to be directed by McKimson.

=== February ===
- February 24: Abe Levitow's Tom and Jerry cartoon O-Solar-Meow premieres, produced by Chuck Jones.

=== March ===
- March 8: Rankin/Bass Productions releases Mad Monster Party?.
- March 10: Abe Levitow's Tom and Jerry cartoon Guided Mouse-ille premieres, produced by Chuck Jones.

=== April ===
- April 2:
  - Speed Racer premieres.
  - The first episode of Osamu Tezuka's Princess Knight airs.
- April 7: Abe Levitow's Tom and Jerry cartoon Rock 'n' Rodent premieres, produced by Chuck Jones.
- April 10: 39th Academy Awards: A Herb Alpert and the Tijuana Brass Double Feature by John Hubley and Faith Hubley wins the Academy Award for Best Animated Short.
- April 14: Chuck Jones' Tom and Jerry cartoon Cannery Rodent premieres.
- April 21: Abe Levitow's Tom and Jerry cartoon The Mouse from H.U.N.G.E.R. premieres, produced by Chuck Jones.
- April 28: Karel Zeman's The Stolen Airship premieres.
- April 29: The Speedy Gonzales and Daffy Duck cartoon Quacker Tracker premieres, it was one of the 3 Speedy & Daffy shorts to be directed by Rudy Larriva & produced by Format Films.

=== May ===
- May 5: Abe Levitow's Tom and Jerry cartoon Surf-Bored Cat premieres, produced by Chuck Jones.
- May 27: The Speedy Gonzales and Daffy Duck cartoon The Music Mice-Tro premieres, it was one of the 3 Speedy & Daffy shorts to be directed by Rudy Larriva & produced by Format Films.

=== June ===
- June 12: The Peanuts TV special You're in Love, Charlie Brown premieres on CBS. This special marks the animated debut of Peppermint Patty.
- June 23: The Tom and Jerry cartoon, Shutter Bugged Cat (directed by Tom Ray and produced by Chuck Jones), premieres. The short featured footage from William Hanna & Joseph Barbera's following Tom and Jerry cartoons: Part Time Pal, The Yankee Doodle Mouse, Nit-Witty Kitty, Johann Mouse, Heavenly Puss, & Designs on Jerry.
- June 24: The Speedy Gonzales and Daffy Duck cartoon The Spy Swatter premieres, it was the final Speedy & Daffy short to be directed by Rudy Larriva & produced by Format Films.

=== July ===
- July 29: The Speedy Gonzales and Daffy Duck cartoon Speedy Ghost to Town premieres, it was the first Looney Tunes/Merrie Melodies short to be directed by Alex Lovy & produced by Warner Bros.-Seven Arts Animation.

=== August ===
- August 25: Ben Washam's Tom and Jerry cartoon Advance and Be Mechanized premieres.

=== September ===
- September 8: The final Tom and Jerry theatrical short, Purr-Chance to Dream (directed by Ben Washam and produced by Chuck Jones), premieres.
- September 9:
  - The first episode of George of the Jungle airs, along with the segment Super Chicken.
  - The first episode of Spider-Man airs.
- September 23: Alex Lovy's Speedy Gonzales and Daffy Duck cartoon Rodent to Stardom premieres, produced by Warner Bros.-Seven Arts Animation.
- September 29: The first episode of Captain Scarlet and the Mysterons airs.
- September 30: Alex Lovy's Speedy Gonzales and Daffy Duck cartoon Go Away Stowaway premieres, produced by Warner Bros.-Seven Arts Animation.

=== October ===
- October 18: Walt Disney's 19th full-length animated feature The Jungle Book, the last animated film personally supervised by Disney, is first released and becomes an enormous box-office and critical success. On a double bill with the film is the (now) much less well-known film Charlie the Lonesome Cougar.

=== December ===
- December 2: The film The Wacky World of Mother Goose, produced by Rankin/Bass Productions, premieres.
- December 6: The first episode of Théâtre de Monsieur & Madame Kabal (Mr. and Mrs. Kabal's Theatre) airs.
- December 9: Alex Lovy's Speedy Gonzales and Daffy Duck cartoon Fiesta Fiasco premieres, produced by Warner Bros.-Seven Arts Animation This short was made to celebrate Daffy's 30th anniversary.
- December 20: Belvision releases the first Astérix movie, Asterix the Gaul which is directed by Ray Goossens.
- December 26: The first episode of the British children's TV show Do Not Adjust Your Set airs, which is the first time audiences can watch Terry Gilliam's cut-and-paste animated sequences.
- December 31: Chuck Jones' The Bear That Wasn't produced by MGM Animation/Visual Arts, is released.

=== Specific date unknown ===
- The first episode of Professor Balthazar airs.

== Films released ==
- January 21 - A Story of Hong Gil-dong (South Korea)
- February 15 - Band of Ninja (Japan)
- February 26 - Jack and the Beanstalk (United States)
- March 8 - Mad Monster Party? (United States and Japan)
- March 19:
  - Cyborg 009: Monster Wars (Japan)
  - Jack and the Witch (Japan)
- April 28 - The Stolen Airship (Czechoslovakia)
- July 21 - The Madcap Island (Japan)
- July 30 - Heungbu and Nolbu (South Korea)
- August 15 - Hopi and Chadol Bawi (South Korea)
- September 27 - The Wacky World of Mother Goose (United States and Japan)
- October 18 - The Jungle Book (United States)
- December 6 - Mr. and Mrs. Kabal's Theatre (France)
- December 18 - Cricket on the Hearth (United States and Japan)
- December 20 - Asterix the Gaul (France and Belgium)
- Specific date unknown - The Halas & Batchelor Ruddigore (United Kingdom)

== Television series ==
- January 1 - Araa, Gudzulla Da To debuts on Fuji TV.
- January 3 - Trumpton debuts on BBC1.
- January 7 - Gokū no Daibōken debuts on Fuji TV.
- January 29 - Subarashii Sekai Ryoho: Alaska No Tabi: Daigo Hyogaki debuts on Fuji TV.
- March 15 - Johnny Cypher in Dimension Zero debuts in syndication.
- April 1:
  - Kaminari-Bôya Pikkari-Bî debuts on TV Asahi.
  - Ogon Bat debuts on Yomiuri TV and Nippon TV.
- April 2:
  - Mach Go Go Go (Speed Racer in the U.S.) debuts on Fuji TV.
  - Princess Knight debuts on Fuji TV.
- April 4:
  - 001/7 Oyayubi Tom debuts on TV Asahi.
  - Bôken Gaboten-Jima debuts on TBS.
- April 5 - Sekai no Osha King Kong Daikai debuts on TV Asahi.
- May 15 - Professor Balthazar debuts on HRT 2.
- July 3 - Pyun Pyun Maru debuts on TV Asahi.
- August 7 - The Adventures of Hijitus debuts on Canal 13.
- September 7 - Donkikko debuts on TBS.
- September 8 - Off To See The Wizard debuts on ABC.
- September 9:
  - Fantastic Four, Spider-Man, Super Chicken, Tom Slick, George of the Jungle, and Journey to the Center of the Earth debut on ABC.
  - Aquaman, Shazzan, The Herculoids, The Superman/Aquaman Hour of Adventure, and Moby Dick and Mighty Mightor debut on CBS.
  - Birdman and the Galaxy Trio, Spy Shadow, Super President, and Samson & Goliath debut on NBC.
  - The Abbott and Costello Cartoon Show debuts in syndication.
- September 18 - Bôken Shônen Shadar debuts on TV Asahi.
- September 29 - Captain Scarlet and the Mysterons debuts on ITV.
- October 2 - Chibikko Kaiju Yadamon debuts on Fuji TV.
- October 4 - Skyers 5 debuts on TBS.
- October 7 - Oraa Guzura Dado debuts on Fuji TV.
- Specific date unknown - Reksio debuts on Telewizja Polska.

== Births ==
=== January ===
- January 1: John Requa, American screenwriter (The Wild Thornberrys, The Angry Beavers, Smallfoot).
- January 2: Tia Carrere, American voice actress (voice of Nani Pelekai in the Lilo & Stitch franchise, Queen Tyr'ahnee in Duck Dodgers, Amy Cavenaugh and Judy Reeves in Scooby-Doo! Mystery Incorporated, Jezebel Jade in Tom and Jerry: Spy Quest, Marigold in the Hercules episode "Hercules and the Golden Touch", Darklos in the Megas XLR episode "DMV: Department of Megas Violations", Yan Yan in the American Dragon: Jake Long episode "Fu and Tell", Mija in the Happily Ever After: Fairy Tales for Every Child episode "The Little Mermaid"), and singer (sang "I Never Even Told You" from Batman: Mask of the Phantasm).
- January 7: Irrfan Khan, Indian actor (dub voice of Baloo in The Jungle Book), (d. 2020).
- January 8: R. Kelly, American singer, songwriter, record producer and convicted sex offender (wrote and performed "I Believe I Can Fly" in Space Jam).
- January 9: Steve Harwell, American singer and member of Smash Mouth (voice of Papa Bear, Drum Bear and Keyboard Bear in the We Bare Bears episode "Pizza Band", himself in the Kim Possible episode "Queen Bebe" and the What's New, Scooby-Doo? episode "Reef Grief!", performed "All Star" and a cover of "I'm a Believer" in Shrek, and "Hot" in Highway 35), (d. 2023).
- January 15: Brandon Kruse, American animator (Baby Blues, Whatever Happened to... Robot Jones?), storyboard artist (The Tick, Godzilla: The Series, Family Guy, Time Squad, Nickelodeon Animation Studio, The Replacements, Star vs. the Forces of Evil, Be Cool, Scooby-Doo!, Transformers: Robots in Disguise, Stretch Armstrong and the Flex Fighters, Wacky Races, T.O.T.S., Puppy Dog Pals), writer (My Life as a Teenage Robot) and director (Fanboy & Chum Chum).
- January 23: Steve Box, English animator and director (Aardman Animations).
- January 24: Phil LaMarr, American voice actor and comedian (voice of the title character in Samurai Jack, Static and John Stewart in the DC Animated Universe, Hermes Conrad in Futurama, Wilt and Jackie Khones in Foster's Home for Imaginary Friends, Jar Jar Binks, Bail Organa and Kit Fisto in Star Wars: The Clone Wars, Dormammu in Ultimate Spider-Man, Avengers Assemble, and Hulk and the Agents of S.M.A.S.H., Aquaman in Young Justice, Baron Mordo in Avengers Assemble, Black Manta and Lucius Fox in Harley Quinn, Flash and Hawkman in DC Super Hero Girls, J.A.R.V.I.S. in The Avengers: Earth's Mightiest Heroes and Ultimate Spider-Man, Gambit in Wolverine and the X-Men, Hector Con Carne in The Grim Adventures of Billy & Mandy and Evil Con Carne, Osmosis Jones in Ozzy & Drix).
- January 26: Rachel Pulido, American television writer (The Simpsons, Mission Hill).
- January 30: Chris Loudon, American animator (Rugrats, Rocko's Modern Life, The Critic), sheet timer (The Simpsons, Family Guy) and director (Futurama).

=== February ===
- February 2: Doc Hammer, American voice actor, musician, writer and artist (The Venture Bros.).
- February 5: Chris Parnell, American actor and comedian (voice of Jerry Smith in Rick and Morty, Cyril Figgis in Archer, Fly in the Hotel Transylvania franchise, the Narrator in WordGirl, Mr. Peabody in The Mr. Peabody & Sherman Show, Migs in Elena of Avalor, Deathstroke in My Adventures with Superman).
- February 8: Suzie Templeton, British animator (Peter and the Wolf).
- February 10:
  - Vince Gilligan, American television writer, producer, and actor (voice of Axalon in the Penn Zero: Part-Time Hero episode "Mr. Rippen", himself in the American Dad! episode "(You Gotta) Strike For Your Right").
  - Armand Serrano, Filipino animator (Walt Disney Animation Studios).
- February 11: Fabrice Josso, French actor and voice actor (voice of Spleen in Mune: Guardian of the Moon, Zack Fair in the French dub of Final Fantasy VII: Advent Children).
- February 13:
  - Carolyn Lawrence, American voice actress, comedienne and sister of Mr. Lawrence (voice of Sandy Cheeks in SpongeBob SquarePants, Cindy Vortex in Jimmy Neutron: Boy Genius and The Adventures of Jimmy Neutron, Boy Genius, Orel in Moral Orel).
  - Arik Marshall, American musician, author and member of the Red Hot Chili Peppers (voiced himself in The Simpsons episode "Krusty Gets Kancelled").
- February 20: David Herman, American actor and comedian (voice of Mr. Gar and Brandon in OK K.O.! Let's Be Heroes, Buckley, Jimmy Wichard, and Eustace in King of the Hill, Scruffy and Mayor C. Randall Poopenmeyer in Futurama, Guard Shack Elf in Olive, the Other Reindeer, various characters in Invader Zim, Roy Horn in Father of the Pride, Buzz in Bee Movie, Arboreus in American Dad!, Principal Fakey in Moral Orel, Ubuntu Goode in The Goode Family, Phillip Frond in Bob's Burgers, Steve Williams in Brickleberry, The Herald, Jerry, Chazzzzz, and Guysbert in Disenchantment, Kevin Crawford in Paradise PD, Peter in Bless the Harts, Dmitry in Central Park, Santiago Carpaccio and Gill Beavers in The Great North, German Tourist, Gage and Jail Warden in Beavis and Butt-Head Do the Universe).
- February 23: Eric Kaplan, American television producer and writer (Futurama, Out of Jimmy's Head, The Problem Solverz, The Simpsons, King Star King, creator of Zombie College, co-creator of The Drinky Crow Show).

=== March ===
- March 1: George Eads, American actor (voice of Flash in Young Justice, Captain Atom in the Justice League Unlimited episode "Initiation").
- March 9: Neil Kaplan, American voice actor (voice of Shigekuni Yamamoto in Bleach, Dormammu, Colossus, and Magneto in Marvel Disk Wars: The Avengers, Optimus Prime in Transformers: Robots in Disguise, Venus Claptrap and Porkasaurus in Big Bad Beetleborgs, Sheriff Longarm D. Law in the Wacky Races episode "Smokey and the Racers").
- March 15:
  - Naoko Takeuchi, Japanese manga artist (Sailor Moon).
  - Pierre Coffin, French animator (We're Back! A Dinosaur's Story, Warner Bros. Animation), film director (Illumination), producer (Pat & Stan), and voice actor (voice of the Minions in the Despicable Me franchise).
- March 16: Lauren Graham, American actress (voice of Oxana Hauntley in Vampirina, Fran Lockwood in Cloudy with a Chance of Meatballs, Maggie in the Family Guy episode "Road to Europe").
- March 17: Billy Corgan, American musician and member of The Smashing Pumpkins (voiced himself in The Simpsons episode "Homerpalooza").
- March 18: Taiten Kusunoki, Japanese actor (voice of Tosuke Megishima in Food Wars!: Shokugeki no Soma, Antonio Lopez / Rock Bison in Tiger & Bunny, Japanese dub voice of John Stewart in Justice League and Justice League Unlimited, Goliath in Gargoyles, Tank Evans in Surf's Up and Surf's Up 2: WaveMania, Chief in Isle of Dogs).
- March 19: Vinny Montello, American television writer (Rugrats, Toonsylvania, Rayman: The Animated Series, Sitting Ducks, Loonatics Unleashed, Firehouse Tales).
- March 20: Frederick Gardner, American animator and background designer (Warner Bros. Animation, The Simpsons, The Replacements, Johnny Test, Hercules).
- March 22: Henry Madden, American animator, storyboard artist (King of the Hill), sheet timer (The Simpsons, King of the Hill, Dora the Explorer), writer (Dora the Explorer), director (Nickelodeon Animation Studio) and producer (Nickelodeon Animation Studio, Where's Waldo?).
- March 29: Randy Myers, American animator (The Pagemaster, Cats Don't Dance, Quest for Camelot, The Iron Giant, What a Cartoon!), storyboard artist (Victor and Valentino), sheet timer (Cartoon Network Studios, My Life as a Teenage Robot, Codename: Kids Next Door, Warner Bros. Animation, Random! Cartoons, NFL Rush Zone, Marvel Animation, Gravity Falls, Big Mouth), writer (Dexter's Laboratory, The Powerpuff Girls), producer (We Bare Bears) and director (Cartoon Network Studios, Nickelodeon Animation Studio, G.I. Joe: Renegades).
- March 30: Megumi Hayashibara, Japanese voice actress, singer, lyricist and radio personality (voice of Rei Ayanami in Neon Genesis Evangelion, Lina Inverse in Slayers, Ai Haibara in Detective Conan, Ranma Saotome (female) in Ranma ½, Faye Valentine in Cowboy Bebop, Musashi/Jessie in Pokémon, Lime in Saber Marionette J, Himiko Shinobibe in Mashin Hero Wataru).

=== April ===
- April 4: Lisa Hammer, American filmmaker, actress, composer and singer (voice of Triana Orpheus in The Venture Bros.).
- April 5: Tasia Valenza, American voice actress (voice of Jade in The Real Adventures of Jonny Quest, Maria Amino in Ozzy & Drix, Shaak Ti in Star Wars: The Clone Wars, Venisa Doza in Star Wars Resistance, Mariam in the Batman: The Animated Series episode "Baby-Doll").
- April 6:
  - Kathleen Barr, Canadian voice actress (voice of Dot Matrix in ReBoot, Marie Kanker and Kevin in Ed, Edd n Eddy, Trixie Lulamoon and Queen Chrysalis in My Little Pony: Friendship is Magic, Isis in Krypto the Superdog, Mrs. Twombly and Jasper in Littlest Pet Shop, Evil-Lyn in He-Man and the Masters of the Universe, the title character in Rudolph the Red-Nosed Reindeer: The Movie and Rudolph the Red-Nosed Reindeer and the Island of Misfit Toys).
  - Kelli Rabke, American musician and former actress (voice of Kat in Kenny the Shark).
- April 14: Brian Sheesley, American animator (A Wish for Wings That Work, The Ren & Stimpy Show, The Critic), storyboard artist (The Critic, King of the Hill, The Road to El Dorado, 3-South, The Harper House), sheet timer (The Simpsons, Rugrats Go Wild, What's New, Scooby-Doo?, 3-South, Cartoon Network Studios, Sanjay and Craig), writer (The Twisted Tales of Felix the Cat), producer and director (Film Roman, Futurama, Baby Blues, Cartoon Network Studios, Fanboy & Chum Chum, Danger & Eggs, Disenchantment).
- April 20: Lara Jill Miller, American voice actress (voice of Kari Kamiya in Digimon Adventure, the title characters in The Life and Times of Juniper Lee and Henry Hugglemonster, Widget in Wow! Wow! Wubbzy!, Lisa Loud in The Loud House, Chatta, Tune, and Livy in Winx Club, Libby Stein-Torres in The Ghost and Molly McGee, Fink in OK K.O.! Let's Be Heroes, Lambie in Doc McStuffins, Allie from Curious George, Clifford in Clifford's Puppy Days, Izzie in SciGirls, and Petunia Pig in Looney Tunes Cartoons).
- April 21: Denise Blakely Fuller, American background artist (Walt Disney Animation Studios, Jackie Chan Adventures, Coconut Fred's Fruit Salad Island) and matte painter (Toy Story 3, Brave, Hotel Transylvania, Cloudy with a Chance of Meatballs 2, The Book of Life), (d. 2020).
- April 22: Sherri Shepherd, American actress (voice of Cheryl and Heryl in Brandy & Mr. Whiskers, MC Honey in Kim Possible, Queen Fastine in the Blaze and the Monster Machines episode "The Fastest of Them All").
- April 24: Sergey Seryogin, Russian animation director and writer (Alice's Birthday), (d. 2023).
- April 28:
  - Melissa Fahn, American actress (voice of Dorothy in Mobile Suit Gundam 0080: War in the Pocket, Lilith, Shizuko and Mei-Fah in Vampire Princess Miyu, Edward Tivruski IV in Cowboy Bebop, Chante in Arc the Lad, Eri Ninamori in FLCL, the Narrator, Rika Nonaka and Sakuyamon in Digimon: Digital Monsters, Chizuko Oe in Mahoromatic, Kanako Urashima in Love Hina Again, Kaede Misumi in Please Teacher!, Ray Beams in Eureka Seven, Kristy Damon in Digimon Data Squad, Nene Amano in Digimon Fusion, Clara Yotsuba/Glitter Clover in Glitter Force Doki Doki, Himawari Uzumaki in Boruto: Naruto Next Generations, Duusu in Miraculous: Tales of Ladybug & Cat Noir, Tachikoma and Student in Ghost in the Shell: SAC 2045, Dendy in OK K.O.! Let's Be Heroes, Gaz Membrane in Invader Zim, Jessica in Gormiti).
  - Kari Wuhrer, American actress (voice of Maria Hill in The Avengers: Earth's Mightiest Heroes, Silver Banshee in Batman Unlimited: Monster Mayhem, Barbara Kean in Batman: Gotham by Gaslight).

=== May ===
- May 4: Ana Gasteyer, American actress (voice of Reirei in The Lion Guard, Krolia in Voltron: Legendary Defender, Meep in Dawn of the Croods, Genevieve in the Mike Tyson Mysteries episode "The Bard's Curse", Speed Dater in the Family Guy episode "The 2000-Year-Old Virgin").
- May 12: Brent Forrester, American television writer and producer (The Simpsons, King of the Hill).
- May 15:
  - Ron Pardo, Canadian actor (voice of Captain Turbot and Mayor Humdinger in PAW Patrol, Quest in World of Quest, Deputy Mouse in Elinor Wonders Why, Maxum Man in Sidekick, continued voice of Digit in Cyberchase).
  - Brigitte Bako, Canadian actress (voice of Angela in Gargoyles, Monique DuPre in Godzilla: The Series).
- May 16: Jon Schnepp, American animator and television director (Space Ghost Coast to Coast, Aqua Teen Hunger Force, Metalocalypse, The Venture Bros.), (d. 2018).
- May 23: Philip Selway, English musician, drummer and member of Radiohead (voiced himself in the South Park episode "Scott Tenorman Must Die").
- May 24: James Baxter, English animator (Walt Disney Animation Studios, DreamWorks Animation, Cartoon Network Studios, Curious George, Gravity Falls, Klaus, Wolfwalkers).

=== June ===
- June 6: Max Casella, American actor (voice of the title character in Cro, Zini in Dinosaur, Studd Puppy in The Adventures of Hyperman, Tip in The Little Mermaid II: Return to the Sea, Tony B. and Philly D. in the Hey Arnold! episode "Cool Jerk", Fungi in The Legend of Tarzan episode "Tarzan and the Enemy Within", Beaver in the Courage the Cowardly Dog episode "A Beaver's Tale", Vincent Wheeler in the Kim Possible episode "Triple S").
- June 8: Ian Boothby, Canadian comic book and television writer (Casper's Haunted Christmas, Yakkity Yak, Scary Godmother: The Revenge of Jimmy, Ricky Sprocket: Showbiz Boy, Casper's Scare School, Pirate Express).
- June 15: Fred Tatasciore, American voice actor (voice of Hulk in various series for Marvel Animation, Ben 10,000, Cannonbolt, Ripjaws, and Way Big in Ben 10, Pacha in the first season of The Emperor's New School, Buff Frog in Star vs. the Forces of Evil, Solomon Grundy in Justice League Action, DC Super Hero Girls, and Batman: The Long Halloween, Yosemite Sam, Tasmanian Devil, and Gossamer in Looney Tunes Cartoons, Tuna Sandwich in Kid Cosmic, Drax the Destroyer in What If...?, the title character in Hit-Monkey, Devil Dinosaur in Moon Girl and Devil Dinosaur, Jim Gordon in DC Super Hero Girls, Metamorpho and Deathstroke in Young Justice, Beast in Wolverine and the X-Men).
- June 20: Nicole Kidman, American actress and producer (voice of Norma Jean in Happy Feet, Queen Ellsmere in Spellbound).
- June 27: Samantha Newark, English-American musician, singer and actress (voice of the title character and Jerrica in Jem).

=== July ===
- July 1: Pamela Anderson, Canadian-American actress and model (voice of the title character in Stripperella, Cyndi in the King of the Hill episode "The Fat and the Furious", Dixie and herself in the Futurama episodes "Fry and the Slurm Factory" and "A Fishful of Dollars").
- July 16:
  - Will Ferrell, American actor and comedian (voice of Bob Oblong in The Oblongs, the Man with the Yellow Hat in Curious George, the title character in Megamind, Lord Business in The Lego Movie franchise).
  - Jonathan Adams, American actor (voice of Atrocitus in Green Lantern: The Animated Series, Kang the Conqueror in The Avengers: Earth's Mightiest Heroes, Vaatu in The Legend of Korra, Ronan the Accuser in Guardians of the Galaxy, Darkseid in Justice League Action, Ultralak in Teen Titans Go!).
- July 18: Vin Diesel, American actor and producer (voice of the title character in The Iron Giant, Riddick in The Chronicles of Riddick: Dark Fury, Groot in the Marvel Cinematic Universe, Dominic Toretto in Fast & Furious Spy Racers, Santiago in Ark: The Animated Series).
- July 19: Peter Bennett, American art director (SpongeBob SquarePants, ChalkZone), (d. 2024).
- July 22: Irene Bedard, American voice actress (voice of the title character in Pocahontas, Pocahontas II: Journey to a New World, the House of Mouse episode "Thanks to Minnie", and Ralph Breaks the Internet, Alice Starseer in The Real Adventures of Jonny Quest, Jean DeWolff in The Spectacular Spider-Man, Catori in Turok: Son of Stone, Cody Long in the What's New Scooby-Doo? episode "New Mexico, Old Monster", Shelly Longshadow in the Young Justice episode "Beneath").
- July 23: Philip Seymour Hoffman, American actor, director and producer (voice of Max Jerry Horowitz in Mary and Max, Will Toffman in the Arthur episode "No Acting, Please"), (d. 2014).
- July 28: Tom Pope, American animator (Futurama), visual effects artist (Walt Disney Animation Studios, Cool World, Cats Don't Dance, Sinbad: Legend of the Seven Seas) and sheet timer (American Dad!, The Cleveland Show, Turbo Fast, Warner Bros. Animation, Clarence, Marvel Animation, Billy Dilley's Super-Duper Subterranean Summer, Big Mouth).
- July 31: Tony Bancroft, American animator, artist and director (Walt Disney Animation Studios, founder of Toonacious Family Entertainment).

=== August ===
- August 8: Lee Unkrich, American film director, editor, screenwriter and animator (Pixar).
- August 16: Mark McCorkle, American recording assistant (DIC Entertainment), television writer (DIC Entertainment, Disney Television Animation) and producer (The Penguins of Madagascar, Monsters vs. Aliens, co-creator of Kim Possible).
- August 18: Brian Michael Bendis, American comic book and television writer (Spider-Man, Spider-Man: The New Animated Series).
- August 19: Louie del Carmen, American animator, storyboard artist (Nickelodeon Animation Studio, Disney Television Animation, DreamWorks Animation, Warner Bros. Animation, Klasky Csupo, 3-South, Stripperella, Drawn Together, The Star, Luck), character designer (Klasky Csupo), illustrator, writer (The Grim Adventures of Billy & Mandy) and director (Rugrats, Rocket Power, DreamWorks Dragons).
- August 22:
  - Ty Burrell, American actor and comedian (voice of Mr. Peabody in Mr. Peabody & Sherman, Captain Marvel in The Super Hero Squad Show, Jack Harris in Duncanville, Bailey in Finding Dory, Henry Gardner in Storks).
  - Adewale Akinnuoye-Agbaje, English actor (voice of Abbas in Fired on Mars, Xavier in Rapunzel's Tangled Adventure, Captain Vervain in Watership Down).
- August 25: Tom Hollander, British actor (voice of Charles Darwin in Extinct, The Mole in The Boy, the Mole, the Fox and the Horse, Alfred Pennyworth in Harley Quinn).
- August 26: Michelle St. John, Canadian actress (voice of Nakoma in Pocahontas and Pocahontas II: Journey to a New World, Shanelle in Beverly Hills Teens).

=== September ===
- September 6: Macy Gray, American singer and actress (voice of Trixie's Grandmother in American Dragon: Jake Long, Kara Karaoke in the Big City Greens episode "Okay Karaoke").
- September 11: Harry Connick Jr., American singer and songwriter (voice of Dean McCoppin in The Iron Giant, Big Baby in the Action League Now! episode "Rock-A-Big-Baby", Lil' Farley in The Happy Elf).
- September 12:
  - Rob Renzetti, American animator and director (Nickelodeon Animation Studio, Cartoon Network, Walt Disney Animation Studios, creator of My Life as a Teenage Robot).
  - Louis C.K., American comedian and actor (voice of Louis in Dr. Katz, Professional Therapist, Max in The Secret Life of Pets).
- September 21: Tim Biskup, American background artist (Nickelodeon Animation Studio, Nightmare Ned, Johnny Bravo, Dexter's Laboratory, Time Squad), character designer (Jumanji) and art director (Happily Ever After: Fairy Tales for Every Child, Time Squad).
- September 22:
  - Parry Gripp, American musician, composer (The 7D), singer and songwriter (Hoops & Yoyo, voiced himself in the Phineas and Ferb episode "Backyard Hodge Podge", performed the theme songs of The Super Hero Squad Show, Ben 10: Omniverse, The 7D, and Ask the StoryBots).
  - Michelle Ruff, American voice actress (voice of Fujiko Mine in Lupin the Third, Rukia Kuchiki in Bleach, Euphemia li Britannia in Code Geass, Elie in Rave Master, Nat in The Promised Neverland, Yuki Nagato in Haruhi Suzumiya, Yoko Littner in Gurren Lagann, Sinon Asada in Sword Art Online, Luna in the Viz Media dub of Sailor Moon).
- September 25: Audrey Wasilewski, American voice actress (voice of Megan Olsen in Infinity Train, Tavern Keeper in Over the Garden Wall, Tucker Carbunkle in My Life as a Teenage Robot, Elke Hubsch in Archer, Arlene in The Garfield Show).
- September 29: Christian McLaughlin, American author, television producer and writer (Brandy & Mr. Whiskers, Drawn Together).
- September 30: Paul Boyd, American-Canadian animator (Ed, Edd n Eddy, Aaagh! It's the Mr. Hell Show!, ¡Mucha Lucha!, Fetch! with Ruff Ruffman), (d. 2007).

=== October ===
- October 2: Lew Temple, American actor (voice of Furgus and Hitch in Rango, Wrangler and Conductor in Spirit Untamed, Caine in Parasite Dolls, Cactus Outlaw #2 in the Super Duper Bunny League episode "Long Tall Sally").
- October 4: Liev Schreiber, American actor, director, screenwriter, and producer (voice of Storm King in My Little Pony: The Movie, Kingpin in Spider-Man: Into the Spider-Verse, Spots in Isle of Dogs, Sam Fisher in Splinter Cell: Deathwatch).
- October 5: Chris Moeller, American animator, storyboard artist (The Simpsons, Recess, King of the Hill), director (The Twisted Tales of Felix the Cat, King of the Hill) and producer (creator of Tripping the Rift), (d. 2014).
- October 10: Michael Giacchino, American composer (Pixar, Zootopia, Extinct, composed the song "World's Worst Internet Troll" for The Simpsons episode "Do Pizza Bots Dream of Electric Guitars").
- October 12: Steve Ressel, American comic book artist, animator, storyboard artist (Rocko's Modern Life, Wild C.A.T.s, Jumanji, Klasky Csupo), sheet timer (Duckman), producer and director (Jumanji, Klasky Csupo, God, the Devil and Bob, Invader Zim).
- October 16: Taiki Matsuno, Japanese actor (voice of Agumon in Digimon Savers, Arthur Jung in Mobile Suit Gundam F91, Billy in Moomin, Mr. Rascal and Kankan and Foxy in Akazukin Chacha, Rokusuke and Nishikawi in Rurouni Kenshin, Helios and Pegasus in Sailor Moon, Miguel in The Vision of Escaflowne, Kouga in Inuyasha, Japanese dub voice of SpongeBob SquarePants in the SpongeBob SquarePants franchise), (d. 2024).
- October 17: Venus Terzo, Canadian actress (voice of Jean Grey in X-Men: Evolution, Lady Elaine in King Arthur and the Knights of Justice, Princess Lana in Captain N: The Game Master, Lucia von Bardas in Fantastic Four: World's Greatest Heroes, Blackarachnia in the Beast Wars franchise, Wedy in Death Note, Talia Gladys in Mobile Suit Gundam Seed Destiny, female Ranma Saotome in Ranma ½).
- October 18:
  - Alexander Williams, English animator, designer and cartoonist (Who Framed Roger Rabbit, The Princess and the Cobbler, Quest For Camelot, The Iron Giant, Piglet's Big Movie, Robots, Open Season, DreamWorks Animation, voice of Tiny Tim in A Christmas Carol).
  - Eric Stuart, American voice actor and musician (voice of Brock and James in seasons 1-8 of Pokémon, Seto Kaiba in Yu-Gi-Oh! Duel Monsters, Gourry Gabriev in Slayers).
- October 22: Carlos Mencia, Honduran-American actor, comedian and writer (voice of Poncho and Xolotl in Happily Ever After: Fairy Tales for Every Child, Felix Boulevardez in The Proud Family and The Proud Family: Louder and Prouder, King of Mexico in the Drawn Together episode "Mexican't Buy Me Love").
- October 24: Neal Boushell, American television writer (Baby Blues, The Simpsons, American Dad!, George of the Jungle, Back at the Barnyard, The Emperor's New School, Rekkit Rabbit, Kick Buttowski: Suburban Daredevil, Nella the Princess Knight, The Unstoppable Yellow Yeti).
- October 28: Julia Roberts, American actress (voice of Hava in The Ant Bully, Charlotte in Charlotte's Web, Willow in Smurfs: The Lost Village).
- October 29:
  - Rufus Sewell, British actor (voice of Sir Claude in Blinky Bill the Movie).
  - Joely Fisher, American actress (voice of Lana Lang in Superman: The Animated Series, Princess Pamina in the ABC Weekend Special episode "The Magic Flute").
- October 31: Adam Schlesinger, American musician, songwriter, composer (TV Funhouse) and record producer (performed the theme songs for T.U.F.F. Puppy, Supernoobs and Johnny Test), (d. 2020).

=== November ===
- November 1: Kara Vallow, American animation producer (Teenage Mutant Ninja Turtles, Dino Babies, Johnny Bravo, Men in Black: The Series, Dilbert, Family Guy, 3-South, American Dad!, The Cleveland Show).
- November 2: Akira Ishida, Japanese actor and voice actor (voice of Cho Hakkai in Saiyuki, Saki Abdusha in You're Under Arrest, Setsuna Aoki in Sakura Wars, Makoto Kurumizawa in Boys Be, Athrun Zala in Mobile Suit Gundam SEED and Mobile Suit Gundam SEED Destiny, Kaworu Nagisa in Neon Genesis Evangelion, Katsura Kotaro in Gintama, Fyodor Dostoyevsky in Bungou Stray Dogs, Zeref Dragneel in Fairy Tail, Gaara in the Naruto franchise, Xerxes Break in Pandora Hearts, Tamazuki in Nurarihyon no Mago, Gabriel Miller/Subtilizer in Sword Art Online, Cavendish in One Piece, Keiji Mogami in Mob Psycho 100, Hideo Shimada in Parasyte, Shuichi Natori in Natsume's Book of Friends, Mutsumi Houjou in Sgt. Frog, Akaza in Demon Slayer: Kimetsu no Yaiba the Movie: Infinity Train, Eishi Tsukasa in Food Wars! Shokugeki no Soma).
- November 3: Mike Bell, American actor and writer (voice of Santa Claus and Fisherman in SpongeBob SquarePants).
- November 7: Dave Cooper, Canadian cartoonist oil painter and animator (Pig Goat Banana Cricket).
- November 10: Michael Jai White, American actor (voice of Bronze Tiger in Batman: Soul of the Dragon, Doomsday in Justice League and Justice League Unlimited, the title character in Black Dynamite, Osebo in Static Shock, Bushido Brown in The Boondocks episode "Stinkmeaner 3: The Hateocracy", Tattooed Man in the Batman: The Brave and the Bold episode "Scorn of the Star Sapphire!").
- November 13:
  - Jimmy Kimmel, American television host, actor, comedian, and producer (voice of Spanky in Garfield: The Movie, Mrs. Ham in Drawn Together, Passive-Aggressive Smurf in The Smurfs 2, Ted Templeton in The Boss Baby and The Boss Baby: Family Business, Batman in Teen Titans Go! To the Movies, Marty Muckracker in PAW Patrol: The Movie, Death's Dog, Man in Suit and Renaissance Guy in the Family Guy episode "Mr. Saturday Knight", himself in the Glenn Martin, DDS episode "Camp Part 2").
  - Steve Zahn, American actor (voice of Runt of the Litter in Chicken Little, Thunderclap in The Good Dinosaur, Hawk in Escape from Planet Earth, Swampy in Phineas and Ferb, Terry McFist in the Randy Cunningham: 9th Grade Ninja episode "Fart-Topia").

=== December ===
- December 1: Néstor Carbonell, American actor (voice of Señor Senior Jr. in Kim Possible, Savio in The Penguins of Madagascar, Chief Cruz in Big Hero 6: The Series, Eagle-Eye in Jake and the Never Land Pirates, King Raul in Elena of Avalor, El Diablo in the Justice League Unlimited episode "The Once and Future Thing", Tito in the Brandy & Mr. Whiskers episode "Rain Delay", Cupid in the American Dragon: Jake Long episode "The Love Cruise", Ponce de Leon in the DuckTales episode "The Forbidden Fountain of the Foreverglades!").
- December 6:
  - Judd Apatow, American actor, comedian (voice of Jay Leno in The Critic episode "L.A. Jay", himself in The Simpsons episode "Steal This Episode"), director, producer (The Critic) and screenwriter (The Critic, The Simpsons).
  - Sparky Marcus, American former voice actor (voice of Banjo in Banjo the Woodpile Cat, the title character in Richie Rich, Dorno in Space Stars, T.J. Tiger in Shirt Tales, Dexter in the Space Ace segment of Saturday Supercade, Montgomery Moose in The Get-Along Gang, Nick Burns in Challenge of the GoBots).
- December 8: Kotono Mitsuishi, Japanese actress, singer and narrator (voice of the title character in the Sailor Moon franchise, Misato Katsuragi in Neon Genesis Evangelion, Boa Hancock in One Piece, Juri Arisugawa in Revolutionary Girl Utena, Masimo Ageo in Crayon Shin-chan, Hummy in Suite PreCure).
- December 11: Peter Kelamis, Australian-Canadian actor, comedian and impressionist (voice of Goku in the Ocean dub of Dragon Ball Z, Rolf in Ed, Edd n Eddy, Tail Terrier in Krypto the Superdog).
- December 12: Pat Shortt, Irish actor, comedian, writer and entertainer (voice of Lug in Song of the Sea).
- December 13: Jamie Foxx, American actor, comedian, and musician (voice of Joe Gardner in Soul, Nico in Rio and Rio 2, Jungata in The Samurai of Tsushima).

=== Specific date unknown ===
- Howy Parkins, American animator and director (Nickelodeon Animation Studios, Disney Television Animation).
- Jamie Kezlarian Bolio, American marketer and animator (Rocko's Modern Life, We're Back! A Dinosaur's Story, Walt Disney Animation Studios, The Illusionist), (d. 2021).
- Jane O'Brien, American television producer (Futurama) and writer (The Simpsons).
- Jim Pirri, American actor (voice of Alador Blight in The Owl House, Krang One in Rise of the Teenage Mutant Ninja Turtles: The Movie, Sal Maroni in Batman: The Long Halloween, Mr. Branzino in Luca, Vandal Savage in Suicide Squad: Hell to Pay).
- Jim Short, Australian-born American comedian (voice of Keith Richards in the God, the Devil and Bob episode "Keith Richards"), (d. 2025).
- Michael Ouweleen, American television executive and screenwriter (Cartoon Network).
- Adam Somner, American producer (The Adventures of Tintin, Who Framed Roger Rabbit) and assistant director (The Adventures of Tintin, Rango, The Cat Returns), (d. 2024).

== Deaths ==
=== January ===
- January 11: Wolfgang Zeller, German film composer (composed the orchestral score for the animated film The Adventures of Prince Achmed), dies at age 73.
- January 31: Oskar Fischinger, German-American painter and animator (Motion Painting No. 1, Pinocchio, Fantasia), dies at age 66.

=== February ===
- February 2: Jack Carr, American animator (Charles Mintz, Warner Bros. Cartoons, Hanna-Barbera), and actor (voice of Buddy in Looney Tunes), dies at age 60.

=== March ===
- March 6: Nelson Eddy, American singer and actor (narrator and voice of Willie the Whale in "The Whale Who Wanted to Sing at the Met" in Make Mine Music), dies at age 65.
- March 19: Gil Turner, American animator, comics artist and film producer (Walt Disney Animation Studios, Warner Bros. Cartoons, MGM, Walter Lantz Productions, UPA, Hanna-Barbera, Format Films), dies at age 54.

=== April ===
- April 22: Tom Conway, British actor (narrator in Peter Pan, voice of Collie and Quizmaster in One Hundred and One Dalmatians), dies at age 62.

=== May ===
- May 8: LaVerne Andrews, American singer (co-sang the "Johnny Fedora and Alice Blue Bonnet" segment in Make Mine Music, and "Little Toot" in Melody Time), dies at age 55.
- May 9: Wallace Carlson, American animator, film director and comics artist (worked for J.R. Bray, founder of Carlson Studios), dies at age 73.

=== June ===
- June 7: Willy Lateste, Belgian animator and comics artist (Belvision), dies at age 36.
- July 21: Basil Rathbone, South African-British actor (narrator of "The Wind in the Willows" segment in The Adventures of Ichabod and Mr. Toad), dies at age 75.

=== October ===
- October 3: Pinto Colvig, American clown, actor, and cartoonist (voice of Goofy and Pluto, Practical Pig in Three Little Pigs, Sleepy and Grumpy in Snow White and the Seven Dwarfs, Bluto in Popeye, Gabby in Gulliver's Travels, the title character in Conrad the Sailor), dies at age 75.

=== December ===
- December 31: Hoàng Việt, Vietnamese composer and animator, dies at age 39.

== See also ==
- 1967 in anime
