= 1967 in anime =

The events of 1967 in anime.

== Releases ==
English name	Japanese name	Type	Demographic	Regions
Adventures of the Monkey King	悟空の大冒険 (Gokū no Daibōken)	TV	Shōnen	JA
Tales of the Ninja	忍者武芸帳 (Ninja Bugei-chō)	Movie	General	JA
Cyborg 009: Monster Wars	サイボーグゼロゼロナイン 怪獣戦争 (Saibōgu Zero-Zero-Nain: Kaijū Sensō)	Movie	Shōnen	JA
Jack and the Witch	少年ジャックと魔法使い (Shōnen Jakku to Mahōtsukai)	Movie	Family, Children	JA
Pikkaribee, Boy of the Thunders	かみなり坊やピッカリ★ビー (Kaminari Boy Pikkari★bee)	TV	Shōnen	JA
Golden Bat	黄金バット (Ōgon Bat)	TV	Shōnen	JA, EU
Perman	パーマン (Pāman)	TV	Shōnen, Children	JA
Speed Racer	マッハGoGoGo (Mahha GōGōGō)	TV	Shōnen	JA, NA
Princess Knight	リボンの騎士 (Ribon no Kishi)	TV	Shōjo	JA
Adventure on the Gaboten Island	冒険ガボテン島 (Bōken Gabotenjima)	TV	Shōnen	JA, KO
The King Kong Show	キングコング00 1/7親指トム (Kingu Kongu 00 1/7 Oyayubi Tomu)	TV	Shōnen	JA
Pyun Pyun Maru	ピュンピュン丸 (Pyunpyunmaru)	TV	Shōnen	JA
Don Quijote	ドンキッコ (Donkikko)	TV	Shōnen	JA
Adventures of the Young Shadar	冒険少年シャダー (Bōken Shōnen Shadar)	TV	Shōnen	JA, EU
Yadamon the Little Monster	ちびっこ怪獣ヤダモン (Chibikko Kaiju Yadamon)	TV	Children	JA
Skyers 5	スカイヤーズ5 (Skyers 5)	TV	Shōnen	JA
Gazula the Amicable Monster	おらぁグズラだど (Oraa Guzura Dado)	TV	Children	JA
Heidi, Girl of the Alps: Pilot Version	アルプスの少女ハイジ パイロット版 (Arupusu no Shōjo Haiji: Pairotto ban)	TV special	Shōjo	JA
The Room	部屋 (Heya)	Short	General	JA

== See also ==
- 1967 in animation

== Births ==
- March 11 - Morio Asaka, director, storyboard artist, animator
