= Odd Jobs (1986 film) =

- VHS cover
- Directed by: Mark Story
- Written by: Robert Conte; Peter Martin Wortmann
- Produced by: Keith Rubinstein
- Starring: Paul Reiser; Robert Townsend
- Cinematography: Arthur Albert
- Edited by: Dennis M. Hill
- Music by: Robert Folk
- Production companies: HBO Pictures; Silver Screen Partners
- Distributed by: Tri-Star Pictures
- Release date: March 1986
- Running time: 88 minutes
- Country: United States
- Language: English

Odd Jobs is a 1986 American comedy film directed by Mark Story. It was the last film distributed by TriStar Pictures before HBO dropped out of the TriStar venture and sold half of its shares to Columbia Pictures (later sold to Sony).

== Plot ==
College students Max and Dwight form a moving company to pay for tuition. Along the way, they cross the Mob, which runs a rival moving company.

== Cast ==
- Paul Reiser as Max
- Robert Townsend as Dwight
- Scott McGinnis as Woody
- Rick Overton as Roy
- Paul Provenza as Byron
- Leo Burmester as Wylie D. Daiken
- Thomas Quinn as Frankie
- Savannah Smith Boucher as Loretta & Lynette
- Richard Dean Anderson as "Spud"
- Richard Foronjy as Manny
- Ken Olfson as Mayor Brady
- Charlie Dell as Earl
- Starletta DuPois as Dwight's Mother
- Don Imus as Monty Leader
- Wayne Grace as Roy's Father
- Julianne Phillips as Sally
- Leon Askin as Don Carlucci
- Andra Akers as Mrs. Finelli
- Chuck Pfeiffer as The Doris Bodyguard & Dead Meat
- Jill Goodacre as Co-Ed
- Tom Dugan as Lester
- David Barco as College Student 1
- Jason Ainley as College Student 2

== Critical reception ==
The movie received generally poor reviews. The Sun-Sentinel called it "insufferable" and full of "stupid sight gags and pointless jokes." It currently holds a score of 26% on Rotten Tomatoes.
