= Oliver Clark =

American character actor

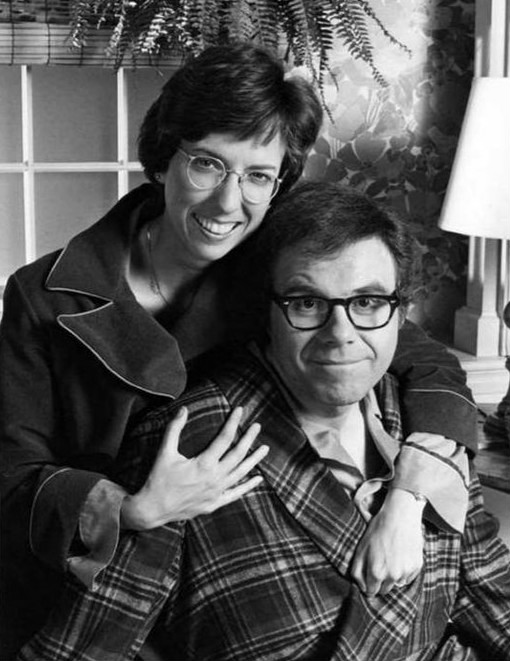
- Clark with Beverly Archer in We've Got Each Other, 1977
- Born: Richard Mardirosian; January 4, 1939 (age 87); Buffalo, New York, U.S.
- Occupation: Actor
- Years active: 1964–2003
- Relatives: Tom Mardirosian (brother)

Oliver Clark (born Richard Mardirosian; January 4, 1939) is an American character actor.

== Early life ==
Clark was born in Buffalo, New York, the son of Afro (née Karahos) and Matthew Mardirosian. He is of Armenian heritage. His brother, Tom Mardirosian, is also an actor.

== Career ==
Clark made numerous appearances in film and television, particularly in the 1970s (notably as Mr. Farcus in the 1970 movie The Landlord, as Mr. Small in the 1971 film They Might Be Giants, and in the 1976 remake of A Star Is Born). Two of his best-known TV characters were John Doe #6 on the NBC drama St. Elsewhere, a likeable and humorous psychiatric patient, and Mr. Herd, a patient of psychologist Bob Hartley on The Bob Newhart Show, a long running CBS situation comedy. He played Mr. Belding in the original pilot of the series Good Morning, Miss Bliss but was subsequently replaced by Dennis Haskins.

Clark also played Roger Barton on an episode of The Golden Girls, and played Joe Carruthers, the man who later becomes Santa Claus, in the holiday comedy film Ernest Saves Christmas. He portrayed his Santa role again in the 1996 animated Christmas in Cartoontown.

Clark also appeared on two episodes of M*A*S*H, once as Hawkeye's college buddy, a Navy doctor on board an aircraft carrier off the Korean coast. Later Clark played another Benjamin Pierce who came to the 4077th to retrieve mail that Hawkeye had received in an Army mixup.

Clark also played roles on Barney Miller, appearing in six episodes. He was a regular on the 1975 situation comedy Karen. In 1977, he appeared in an episode of the ABC crime drama The Feather and Father Gang.

In 1995, he had a guest appearance on the sitcom Full House as DJ Tanner's (Candace Cameron-Bure) high school principal, Mr. Robolard, in the eighth-season episode "Up on the Roof".

== Filmography ==
=== Film ===
Year	Title	Role	Notes
1970	End of the Road	Dog Man	
1970	The Landlord	Mr. Farcus	
1971	They Might Be Giants	Mr. Small	
1972	Deadhead Miles	Durazno	
1976	The Great Texas Dynamite Chase	Officer Andy	
1976	A Star Is Born	Gary Danziger	
1977	Billy Jack Goes to Washington	Man with Students	
1977	Fire Sale	Mr. Blossom	
1977	Another Man, Another Chance	Evans	
1980	The Last Married Couple in America	Max Dryden	
1983	Doctor Detroit	Shaky Alcoholic Lawyer	
1988	Ernest Saves Christmas	Joe Carruthers	
1996	Christmas in Cartoontown	Santa Claus	Voice
1999	Mystery Men	Reverse Psychologist	
1999	Crazy in Alabama	Endora's Stand-in	
2000	Lost Souls	Mr. Silberman	

=== Television ===
Year	Title	Role	Notes
1968	N.Y.P.D.	Novik	Episode: "Naked in the Streets"
1972	Emergency!	Homer Breedlove	Episode: "Musical Mania"
1973	The Delphi Bureau	Roly Poly	Episode: "The Face That Never Was Project"
1973	Ghost Story	Marks	Episode: "Earth, Air, Fire and Water"
1973	Tenafly	Sam	Episode: "Joyride to Nowhere"
1973	Love, American Style	Josef	Episode: "Love and the Generation Gasp"
1974–1977	The Bob Newhart Show	Mr. Ed Herd	9 episodes
1975	Judgment: The Court Martial of Lieutenant William Calley	Mr. Stover	Television film
1975	The ABC Afternoon Playbreak	Judd Moore	Episode: "The Girl Who Couldn't Lose"
1975	Khan!	Lincoln	Episode: "A Game of Terror"
1975	The Rockford Files	K. Julian Krubm	Episode: "Just by Accident"
1975	Tony Orlando and Dawn	Mate-O-Matic Date #1	Episode: "Ted Knight/Georgia Engel/Henry Aaron"
1975	Karen	Jerry Siegel	2 episodes
1975	The Orphan and the Dude	Oliver 'The Orphan' Smith	Television film
1975	Cannon	Various roles	2 episodes
1975–1982	Barney Miller	Various roles	6 episodes
1976	The Blue Knight	Charlie	Episode: "The Creeper"
1976	Family	T-Shirt Salesman	Episode: "Monday Is Forever"
1976	Arthur Hailey's the Moneychangers	Salesman	Episode: "Part IV"
1976–1977	Mary Hartman, Mary Hartman	Dr. Fermin	30 episodes
1977–1978	We've Got Each Other	Stuart Hibbard	13 episodes
1977, 1978	M*A*S*H	Ben Pierce / Tippy Brooks	2 episodes
1978	Operating Room	Dr Charles Webner	Television film
1978	Fame	Billy Dorfman	Television film
1979	Hanging by a Thread	Eddie Minton	Television film
1981–1982	The Two of Us	Cubby Royce	20 episodes
1982	Hart to Hart	Dr. Oliver Jackson	Episode: "Harts on Campus"
1982, 1989	Knots Landing	Dr. McGee / Carl Berman	2 episodes
1983	I Take These Men	Dr. Norman Krevoy	Television film
1983	Voyagers!	Sam Winthrop	Episode: "Destiny's Choice"
1983	It Takes Two	Ethan	Episode: "Instinct"
1983	Small & Frye	Oliver	Episode: "The Case of the Concerned Husband"
1983	One Cooks, the Other Doesn't	Danny	Television film
1983	Happy Endings	Murray Cramer	Television film
1983	Sawyer and Finn	Railroad man	Television film
1983, 1984	Trapper John, M.D.	Various roles	2 episodes
1984	Legmen	Louis Dantley	Episode: "Still Alive at Five"
1984	The Master	Kendal	Episode: "The Good, the Bad, and the Priceless"
1985	Night Court	Nick Wilson	Episode: "The Birthday Visitor"
1985	The Jeffersons	Whitney Emmett	Episode: "The Truth Hurts"
1985	Rockhopper	Carl Seldon	Television film
1985	Growing Pains	Mr. Ellis	Episode: "Standardized Test"
1985–1987	St. Elsewhere	John Doe #6	8 episodes
1986	Shadow Chasers	Oliver Wendell Holmes	Episode: "Let's Make a Deal"
1986	The Twilight Zone	Dr. Walter Pinkham	Episode: "Tooth and Consequences"
1986	The Fall Guy		Episode: "Beach Blanket Bounty"
1987	Good Morning, Miss Bliss	Mr. Gerald Belding	Episode: "Pilot"
1987, 1988	Mr. Belvedere	Lloyd / Burt Bilinski	2 episodes
1988–1989	Santa Barbara	Mario Tagliatti	7 episodes
1989	Nightlife	Bill	Television film
1989	Dear John	Arthur Prescott	Episode: "The Secret of Success"
1989	The Golden Girls	Roger	Episode: "Comedy of Errors"
1989–1990	Life Goes On	Mr. Leighton	3 episodes
1993	Civil Wars	Gerald Snyder	Episode: "A Liver Runs Through It"
1995	Full House	Principal Robolard	Episode: "Up on the Roof"
1995	Land's End	Mr. Green	Episode: "The Curse of Willis"
1995–1997	Murder One	Judge Douglas Harrigan	3 episodes
1997	George and Leo	Oliver	Episode: "The Cameo Episode"
1997	Murder One: Diary of a Serial Killer	Judge Douglas Harrigan	6 episodes
2000	Walker, Texas Ranger	Dr. Lamarr	Episode: "Thunderhawk"
2003	Ed	Mr. Walsh	Episode: "Business as Usual"
