= Ken Olfson =

American actor

Ken Olfson (April 2, 1937 – December 31, 1997) was an American film, theatre and television actor in the 1970s and 1980s.

== Early life ==
Olfson was born on April 2, 1937, in Dorchester, Massachusetts. He began acting at the age of 10 and was active in Boston Children's Theatre until he was 18. He attended Syracuse University, then studied at the American Theatre Wing. In 1967, he created the role of Dr. Schoenfeld in Bruce Jay Friedman's off-Broadway play Scuba Duba. He was cast as a standby for Charles Nelson Reilly in Neil Simon's God's Favorite, produced on Broadway in 1974.

== Career ==
In 1976, he co-starred on The Nancy Walker Show as Terry Folson, the first gay principal character on American television. In 1978, he appeared on the short-lived series Flying High. Other series included: Mary Hartman, Mary Hartman; One Day at a Time; Happy Days; Charlie's Angels; Eight Is Enough; Gimme a Break!; Three's Company; Diff'rent Strokes; The Jeffersons; Murder, She Wrote; Trapper John, M.D.; and Amazing Stories. His films included Spaceballs, Mr. Mom, Odd Jobs, and Breakin' 2: Electric Boogaloo.

== Personal life and death ==
After volunteering as a lay counselor at the Southern California Counseling Center, the organization appointed him to a staff position as the head of the Training Lay Counselors program. He designed the program, which was attended by the public.

He had a twin, Lewy Olfson, who wrote children's books.

Ken Olfson died of a heart attack on December 31, 1997 in Los Angeles after a two-month illness. He was age 60.

== Filmography ==
=== Film ===
Year	Title	Role	Notes
1977	You Light Up My Life	1st Commercial Director	
1977	Prime Time a.k.a. American Raspberry	Mr. Sloan	
1978	The One and Only	Mr. Arnold	
1978	House Calls	Make-Up man	
1979	H.O.T.S.	Dean Larry Chase	
1983	Mr. Mom	Exec. #3	
1984	Angel	Mr. Saunders	
1984	Breakin' 2: Electric Boogaloo	Randall	
1984	Micki & Maude	Interior Decorator	
1986	Odd Jobs	Mayor Brady	Also known as Summer Jobs in the United States
1986	The Check Is in the Mail...	Assessor	
1987	Spaceballs	Head Usher	
1988	Kandyland	Cleaner Customer	
1989	Trust Me	Benjamin Greenberg	

=== Television ===
Year	Title	Role	Notes
1976	Mary Hartman, Mary Hartman	The Librarian	episode: "Episode 006" (S 1:Ep 6)
1976	One Day at a Time	Mr. Faraday	episode: "Fighting City Hall" (S 1:Ep 9)
1976–1977	The Nancy Walker Show	Terry Folson	
1977	Happy Days	Simpson	episode: "Fonz-How, Inc." (S 4:Ep 22)
1977	Charlie's Angels	Seth	episode:" Unidentified Flying Angels" (S 2:Ep 9)
1978	Flying High	Raymond Strickman	
1978	Starsky & Hutch	Big Ed	episode: "Cover Girl" (a.k.a. "No Deposit, No Return") (S 4:11)
1978	Match Game '78	Himself	episodes: "MG78-47" (S 6:Ep 47); "MG78-48" (S 6:Ep 48); "MG78-49" (S 6:Ep 49); "MG78-50" (S 6:Ep 50); "MG78-51" (S 6:Ep 51)
1982	Madame's Place	Bernie of Culver City	Episode: "The Man is an Artist"
1983	The Jeffersons	Ben	episode: "My Maid...My Wife" (S 9:Ep 14)
1983	Three's Company	Patrick Townsend	episode: "Out On a Limb"
1983	Gimme a Break!	Jason Swinborn III	episode: "Grandpa Robs a Bank" (S 2:Ep 19)
1983	Small & Frye	Freddie the Fence	episode: "Fiddler on the Hoof (Pilot)" (S 1:Ep 1)
1983	Diff'rent Strokes	Mr. Cribbs	episode: "Drafted" (S 6:Ep 5)
1984	Murder, She Wrote	TV Book Critic	episode: "The Murder Of Sherlock Holmes (Pilot)" (S 1:Ep 1)
1985	Remington Steele	Guest	episode: "Steele of Approval" (S 3:Ep 22)
1986	Cagney & Lacey	Lazaroff	episode: "Exit Stage Centre" (S 5:Ep 19)
1986	Amazing Stories	Clifford Monroe	episode: "Hell Toupee" (S 1:Ep 21)
1986	It's Garry Shandling's Show	The Executive	episode: "The Graduate" (S 1:Ep 5)
1988	21 Jump Street	Guest	episode: "Chapel of Love" (S 2:Ep 14)
