= We've Got Each Other =

- Genre: Sitcom
- Created by: Jay Tarses; Tom Patchett
- Starring: Oliver Clark; Beverly Archer
- Country of origin: United States
- Original language: English
- No. of seasons: 1
- No. of episodes: 13

Production
- Executive producers: Jay Tarses; Tom Patchett
- Producer: Jack Burns
- Camera setup: Multi-camera
- Running time: 30 mins.
- Production companies: Company Four; MTM Enterprises

Original release
- Network: CBS
- Release: October 1, 1977 – January 7, 1978

We've Got Each Other is an American television sitcom that aired on CBS from October 1, 1977, to January 7, 1978.

== Premise ==
The television series follows the lives of the Hibbard couple as they navigate their neighbors, work, and daily life. In this series, the roles of housewife and business-man are reversed. Judy is the family's breadwinner.

Stuart Hibbard (Oliver Clark), who works from home and writes for a mail order catalogue ("Herman Gutman Mail Order Catalogs") is married to Judy Hibbard (Beverly Archer) who works as an office manager for forgetful photographer Damon Jerome (Tom Poston). Both Judy and Stuart had a nemesis in their daily lives: self-centered model, Dee Dee Baldwin (Joan Van Ark) was Judy's, and their next door neighbor, Ken Redford (Martin Kove) was Stuart's.

== Cast ==
- Oliver Clark as Stuart Hibbard
- Beverly Archer as Judy Hibbard
- Tom Poston as Damon Jerome
- Joan Van Ark as Dee Dee
- Renn Woods as Donna
- Martin Kove as Ken

== Production ==
The show was created by Tom Patchett and Jay Tarses for MTM Enterprises and CBS, it aired Saturdays following The Bob Newhart Show (also produced by MTM Enterprises), replacing The Mary Tyler Moore Show. The show did not garner critical or commercial success, with cancellation coming after just 13 episodes. At the time, Tarses was quoted in TV Guide as saying he wouldn’t have watched it if he’d been a viewer: “I have better things to do with my time.”

== Episodes ==
No.	Title	Directed by	Written by	Original release date
1	"Pilot"	James Burrows	Jay Tarses & Tom Patchett	October 1, 1977
Judy walks off the job because of an egotistic model.
2	"The Old-Beau Incident"	George Tyne	Mary-David Sheiner	October 8, 1977
Judy goes out to lunch with an old flame.
3	"The Collector"	Will Mackenzie	Sy Rosen	October 15, 1977
Stuart purchases a valuable collector's item for 1 dollar.
4	"Mother McCree"	Harvey Medlinsky	Jack Burns	October 22, 1977
Judy's mother stays with them and Stuart is determined to impress her.
5	"The 101st Hibbard"	Lee Bernhardi	Sy Rosen	October 29, 1977
Stuart finds out that he is responsible for the Hibbards having no children.
6	"Incomplete Pass"	Asaad Kelada	Mary-David Sheiner	November 12, 1977
Damon finds out that his ex-wife is getting married.
7	"A Space Odyssey"	Will Mackenzie	Madeline Di Maggio	November 19, 1977
8	"My Brother's Keeper"	Will Mackenzie	Jack Burns	November 26, 1977
Stuart's brother and his bride sleeps over at the Hibbards'.
9	"Oil Spill"	Tony Mordente	Madeline Di Maggio	December 3, 1977
The tomboy daughter of Dee Dee refuses to follow in her mother's glamorous footsteps.
10	"Miss Wonderful"	Lee Bernhardi	Sy Rosen	December 17, 1977
Judy is chosen as the model for a soap ad.
11	"The Magic Show"	Michael Zinberg	Sy Rosen	December 24, 1977
Stuart tries to become a professional magician.
12	"The Long Vacation"	James Burrows	Lloyd Garver	December 31, 1977
Stuart misses out on the Hibbards' Hawaiian vacation because of last-minute work.
13	"Pumping Iron"	Lee Bernhardi	Jack Burns	January 7, 1978
Judy wants Stuart to shape up.
