= Allan Lurie =

American actor

- Born: July 25, 1923; Hamilton, Ohio, U.S.
- Died: March 10, 2015 (aged 91)
- Occupation: Voice actor
- Years active: 1958–2004
- Children: Peter Lurie

Allan Lurie (July 25, 1923 – March 10, 2015) was an American voice actor. He was also known as Al Laurie and Bert Stewart. He was the father of Peter Lurie, also a voice actor.

== Career ==
Lurie is best known for his voice-over for Mezmaron in the 1982 cartoon Pac-Man and as Uglor the Alien in Space Stars. His name has constantly been shown in Hanna-Barbera cartoon credits, mostly as an additional voice.

He appeared on Gunsmoke in 1959 as a singer in the episode “Wind” (S4E28).

He later died on March 10, 2015.

== Filmography ==
=== Animation ===
- A Pup Named Scooby-Doo - Additional Voices
- Droopy, Master Detective - Additional Voices
- Foofur - Additional Voices (Season 2)
- Midnight Patrol: Adventures in the Dream Zone - Additional Voices
- Pac-Man - Mezmaron
- Pink Panther and Sons - Additional Voices
- Popeye and Son - Additional Voices
- Space Stars - Uglor
- The Adventures of Don Coyote and Sancho Panda - Additional Voices
- The Flintstone Kids - Additional Voices
- The Jetsons - Additional Voices (1985–1987)
- The New Adventures of Jonny Quest - Additional Voices
- The New Yogi Bear Show - Additional Voices
- The Pirates of Dark Water - Additional Voices
- The Smurfs - Additional Voices
- Tom & Jerry Kids - Additional Voices

=== Film ===
- Hollyrock-a-Bye Baby - Additional Voices

=== Video games ===
- Blood Omen 2 (2002) - Bishop

== Dubbing roles ==
=== Video games English dubbing ===
- Metal Gear Solid (1998) - Kenneth Baker
- Metal Gear Solid: The Twin Snakes (2004) - Kenneth Baker
