= Beverly Archer =

American actress

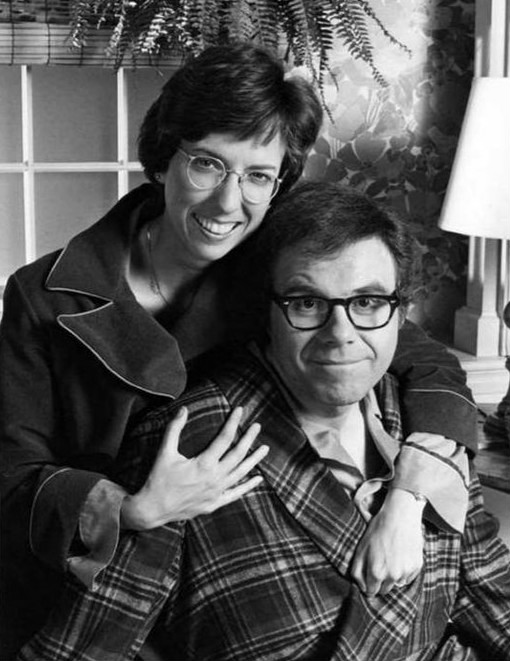
- Archer and Oliver Clark in We've Got Each Other (1977)
- Occupation: Actress
- Years active: 1976–2002

Beverly Archer is an American actress who is perhaps best known as Iola Boylen on Mama's Family and Gunnery Sgt. Alva Bricker on Major Dad.

== Career ==
Early roles for Archer included portraying Nancy Walker's daughter in The Nancy Walker Show, the breadwinner of the family in We've Got Each Other, and a congressman's secretary on Washingtoon.

She became known in the late 1980s and early 1990s for her roles as Iola Boylen on Mama's Family (1986–1990) and as Gunnery Sgt. Alva Bricker on Major Dad (1990–1993). In addition to those roles, she also appeared on The Young and the Restless, ALF, and the movie Project: ALF. She played Charlie's dull teacher in Vice Versa, a thieving teacher in The Brady Bunch Movie, and appeared in two episodes of Married... with Children as Miss Hardaway, a sexually repressed librarian and abstinence counselor who is in love with Bud.

She also appeared in a 1994 episode of Full House, where she played the role of an unsympathetic SAT test monitor. She made guest appearances on episodes of Family Ties, The Fall Guy, and Grace Under Fire.

She retired from acting in 2002.

== Filmography ==
=== Film ===
Year	Title	Role	Notes
1978	A Different Approach	Grocery Shopper	Short film
1988	The Couch Trip	Mrs. Guber	
1988	Vice Versa	Mrs. Luttrell	
1995	The Brady Bunch Movie	Mrs. Whitfield	
1996	Project: ALF	Dr. Carnage	Television film
1998	Walking to the Waterline	Pam Whitman	
1998	The Christmas Wish	Miss Enid Cook	Television film
2000	Going Home	Mrs. Morris	Television film

=== Television ===
Year	Title	Role	Notes
1976-1977	The Nancy Walker Show	Lorraine	13 episodes
1977-1978	We've Got Each Other	Judy Hubbard	13 episodes
1978	ABC Weekend Special	Ms. Greenfield	Episode: "Little Lulu" (S2.E5)
1982	The Magical World of Disney	Angelica	Episode: "The Adventures of Pollyanna" (S28.E22)
1983	It Takes Two	Beatrice	Episode: "The Suit" (S1.E21)
1984	Mama Malone	Iris	Episode: "Dino's Fan" (S1.E11)
1984	Family Ties	Sue Barker	Episode: "4 Rms Ocn Vu" (S3.E8)
1984-1985	Spencer	Miss Spier	11 episodes
1985	Washingtoon	Laura Esterjack	10 episodes
1986	The Fall Guy	Nurse Dievel	Episode: "Lady in Green" (S5.E19)
1986	Comedy Factory	Miss. Carp	Episode: "Chameleon" (S2.E5)
1986-1990	Mama's Family	Iola Boylen	92 episodes
1988	ALF	Mrs. Byrd	3 episodes
1988	My Sister Sam		Episode: "Camp Burn-out" (S2.E15)
1990-1993	Major Dad	GySgt. Alva Bricker	70 episodes
1991	What a Dummy	Mrs. Fine	Episode: "My Imaginary Friend" (S1.E18)
1992	Tiny Toon Adventures	Nurse Kleinerman/Miss Heberly #1 (voice)	Episode: "Grandma's Dead" (S3.E13)
1994	Full House	Mrs. Twitchel	Episode: "The Test" (S7.E15)
1994-1996	Married... with Children	Miss Hardaway	Episodes: "Dial 'B' for Virgin" (S9.E7) and "Bud Hits the Books" (S10.E24)
1994	Love & War	Technician	Episode: "Jack's Breast" (S3.E7)
1994	Grace Under Fire	Alice Dailey	Episode: "Ka-Boom" (S2.E10)
1994-1997	Aaahh!!! Real Monsters	The Liberty Monster/Woman/Maid (all voice roles)	5 episodes
1995	The George Wendt Show	Eleanor	Episode: "And Here's to You, Mrs. Robertson" (S1.E7)
1995	The Mommies	Ms. Clark	Episode: "Four Mommies and a Funeral" (S2.E13)
1996-1998	Jumanji	Ms. Burnbaum (voice)	4 episodes
1997	Duckman: Private Dick/Family Man	Lady Calowina Worthington-Ford (voice)	Episode: "Duckman and Cornfed in 'Haunted Society Plumbers" (S4.E14)
1997	Clueless	Mrs. DeMichael	Episodes: "Suddenly Stupid" (S2.E3) and "A Very P.C. Christmas (Holiday)" (S2.E12)
1999	The Young and the Restless	Shirley Sherwood	12 episodes
2002	Rugrats	Librarian (voice)	Episode: "Quiet, Please/Early Retirement" (S8.E5)

=== Video games ===
Year	Title	Role	Notes
2001	Who Wants to Be a Millionaire: 3rd Edition	Voice talent	Voice role
