= The Nancy Walker Show =

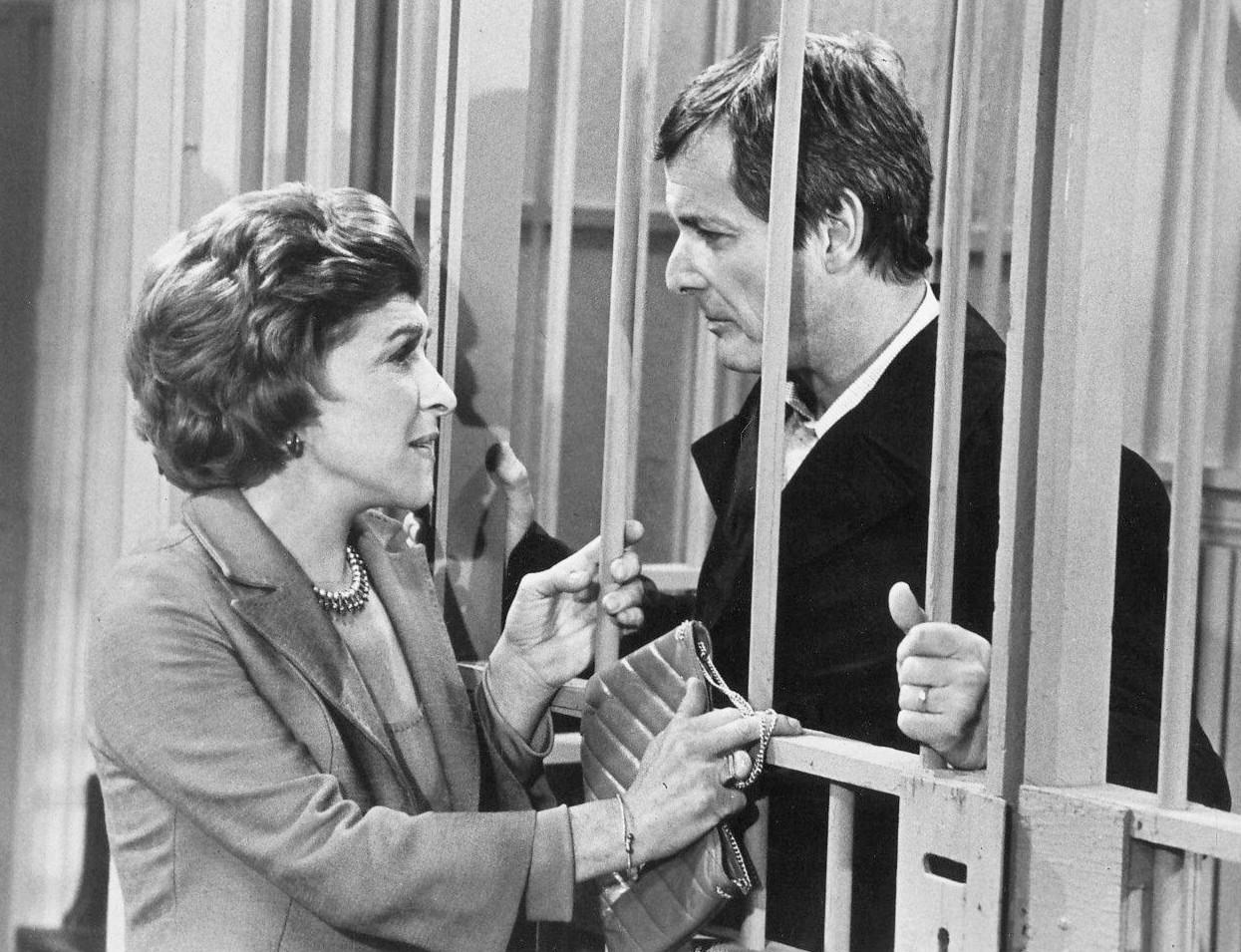
- Nancy Walker and William Daniels as Nancy and Ken Kitteridge
- Genre: Sitcom
- Created by: Norman Lear; Rod Parker
- Starring: Nancy Walker; William Daniels; Ken Olfson; Beverly Archer; James Cromwell; William Schallert; Sparky Marcus
- Opening theme: "Nancy's Blues" by Marvin Hamlisch & Alan and Marilyn Bergman
- Country of origin: United States
- Original language: English
- No. of seasons: 1
- No. of episodes: 13 (1 unaired)

Production
- Executive producer: Norman Lear
- Running time: 30 minutes
- Production company: T.A.T. Communications Company

Original release
- Network: ABC
- Release: September 30 – December 23, 1976

Related
- All in the Family; Maude; Good Times; The Jeffersons; Mary Hartman, Mary Hartman

The Nancy Walker Show is an American sitcom television series that aired from September 30, 1976, to December 23, 1976. The series, produced by Norman Lear, was a starring vehicle for Nancy Walker after she gained a new-found television following as both the McMillans' housekeeper Mildred on McMillan & Wife and as Rhoda Morgenstern's mother Ida Morgenstern on Rhoda. The series was a ratings flop and was cancelled after only 12 aired episodes.

== Synopsis ==
Walker portrayed Nancy Kitteridge, owner of the Nancy Kitteridge Talent Agency in Los Angeles, who led a life that many would find enviable. Nancy operated her agency from her fancy apartment suite, which housed a stream of actors, models, and other showbiz hopefuls who came to Nancy to get advice and their big break; that is, if they weren't famous already. She was happily married, but her husband of 29 years, Lt. Commander Kenneth Kitteridge (William Daniels) was stationed out with the U.S. Navy ten months out of the year, leaving Nancy even more time to devote to her career and all the exciting perks and adventures of a high society Los Angeles life. During the two months that Ken was home, he and Nancy found themselves as newlyweds madly in love. Nancy and Ken had a grown daughter, slow-witted hypochondriac Lorraine (Beverly Archer), who lived nearby with her new husband, Glen (James Cromwell). Although Nancy was hardly lonely when Ken was away, she did have regular male company at home and work (which were practically the same) in unemployed actor and client Terry Folson (Ken Olfson), who was living with his agent while paying room and board as Nancy's secretary. Nancy never had to worry about anything more developing between them because Terry was gay.

However, all this happiness was soon marred when unexpectedly, Ken decided to come home full-time and work locally, primarily to make up for nearly three decades of lost time and devotion to Nancy. Nancy would have been delighted if it weren't for the fact that Ken insisted on bringing Navy-style order and discipline into her life while suggesting that other changes be made that would better accommodate him. Needless to say, Nancy was aghast, and their fast repartee and squabbles were a centerpiece of the comedy. While the two often sparred over Ken's prim conduct, Ken also went as far as trying to throw Terry out of their home (he was "deadwood" in Ken's eyes), and at one point suggested to Nancy that she close down the talent agency so that they could have enough time to spend together. Lorraine and Glen often dropped by to help them sort their disagreements out.

Also seen were hot-shot network TV executive Teddy Futterman (William Schallert), who met with Nancy whenever one of her clients had a shot at further stardom, and Futterman's precocious young son, Michael (Sparky Marcus).

== Cast ==
- Nancy Walker as Nancy Kitteridge
- Sparky Marcus as Michael Futterman
- William Daniels as Kenneth Kitteridge
- Beverly Archer as Lorraine
- William Schallert as Teddy Futterman
- James Cromwell as Glen
- Ken Olfson as Terry Folson

== Episodes ==
No.	Title	Directed by	Written by	Original release date
1	"The Homecoming"	Hal Cooper	Rod Parker	September 30, 1976
2	"The Affair"	Unknown	Unknown	October 7, 1976
3	"Television and War" "Kenneth's Memoirs"	Unknown	Unknown	October 14, 1976
4	"The Anniversary: Part 1"	Alan Rafkin	Unknown	October 21, 1976
5	"The Anniversary: Part 2"	Alan Rafkin	Unknown	October 28, 1976
6	"Debbie of the Derby"	Unknown	Unknown	November 4, 1976
7	"The Partners"	Alan Rafkin	Unknown	November 11, 1976
8	"Nancy's Romantic Evening"	Unknown	Unknown	November 18, 1976
9	"Terry's Depression"	Alan Rafkin	Unknown	November 25, 1976
10	"Dear Dr. Dora"	Alan Rafkin	Unknown	December 2, 1976
11	"Rival Agents"	Alan Rafkin	Unknown	December 9, 1976
12	"Lorraine's Career"	Alan Rafkin	Unknown	December 18, 1976
13	"The Reunion"	Alan Rafkin	Unknown	December 23, 1976

== Notability ==
The Nancy Walker Show featured one of TV's early portrayals of homosexuality, with the character of Terry Folson. At least one American TV series had preceded The Nancy Walker Show with a regular character who was gay; the 1972-1973 ABC sitcom The Corner Bar was the first in TV history to have one, with Vincent Schiavelli's bar patron Peter Panama.

When Nancy Walker signed on to star in this series, her new contract with ABC permitted her to quickly join another existing project before the 1976-77 season ended if The Nancy Walker Show was cancelled after a very short run. ABC did, indeed, drop the series after 10 episodes, and Walker was quickly hired by Garry Marshall to star in his upcoming sitcom Blansky's Beauties, a spin-off from his top-rated Happy Days. Production on the series started so soon that Blansky's Beauties premiered on February 12, 1977, less than two months after the cancellation and last broadcast of The Nancy Walker Show. Walker also had time to film a guest appearance as her new character, Nancy Blansky (who, like Nancy Kitteridge in her previous series, also worked in showbiz) on an episode of Happy Days in order to validate Blansky's as a spin-off of the former.

Blansky's Beauties also failed in the ratings, and was cancelled in the spring of 1977. Thus, Walker is one of the few actors in television to have starred in two failed vehicles in the same season (Walker's Blansky's Beauties co-star, Pat Morita, also earned this distinction in the 1976-77 season, having headlined his own short-lived ABC sitcom, Mr. T and Tina, in the fall of 1976, before the launch of Blansky's). After her infamous season at ABC, Walker returned to her popular role as Ida Morgenstern on Rhoda in the fall of 1977.

== Connections to other Norman Lear series ==
Two cast members of The Nancy Walker Show worked with Norman Lear more than once in their careers. James Cromwell was seen as Stretch Cunningham in a number of episodes of All in the Family during 1974 (Cromwell's character had been referred to in the scripts during the show's first few seasons before he appeared on-screen) and as Bill Lewis, in the short-lived Hot l Baltimore. Child actor Sparky Marcus was cast in Lear's controversial parody Mary Hartman, Mary Hartman soon after the cancellation of The Nancy Walker Show. Mary Hartman mentions the show in episode 178, saying she wishes it was still on the air when she learned about her gay neighbors.
