= Armand Serrano =

Filipino artist

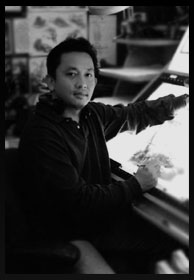
- Photo above taken at the Disney studio in Florida c. 2000 while working on Lilo & Stitch
- Born: Manila, Philippines

Armand Serrano Armand is a Filipino American visual development artist who is known for his works in animated feature film studios such as Walt Disney Animation Studios, Marvel Studios, Sony Pictures Animation, and Skydance Animation. He has been in the animation industry for more than three decades. Armand is currently working as a production designer and art director. He is also known as a lecturer in the field of animation and design and conducts workshops and demos internationally.

== Personal ==
Born and raised in the Philippines, Armand grew up in Quezon City and studied engineering at the University of Santo Tomas in Manila. He received his Bachelor of Science Degree in Civil Engineering in 1989. He practiced as an apprentice engineer for a short time before joining the animation industry.

== Career ==
In May 1990, Armand started in animation as an inbetweener at Fil-Cartoons in Manila, a subsidiary studio of Hanna-Barbera Productions. After ten months as an inbetweener, in March 1991, he moved to layout department, and that was the start of his career. While working for Fil-Cartoons, he was involved in the productions of Captain Planet and the Planeteers, The Addams Family (1992–93), The Pirates of Dark Water, Tom & Jerry Kids and Young Robin Hood, among others.

In 1994, Armand moved to the Philippine Animation Studio, an independent studio also in Manila producing TV series projects for Marvel Productions. He supervised layout for the overseas production of The Fantastic Four (1994–96), X-Men (1992–97), Biker Mice From Mars, and an animated music video for Prince.

In the spring of 1996, Armand moved to the US to work for 7th Level, Inc., a multimedia company which develops games, in Glendale, California. That same year, he completed a Layout Visualization and Background Design course at Associates in Art in Sherman Oaks, California. After a few months, he made a major step by moving to feature animated films at Walt Disney Animation Studios in February 1997. He and his family were relocated to Orlando, Florida to work on their then-ongoing project Mulan (1998).

After seven and a half years and four feature films, Armand decided to move back to the west coast after Disney announced that it is closing its doors to their Florida studio. Sony Pictures Animation took him in to start development on Surf's Up. Armand and his family were relocated back to Los Angeles in 2004. Armand is currently holding an art director post at Sony Pictures Animation.

== Filmography ==
- Open Season 2 (2009, animated film) - Visual Development
- Cloudy with a Chance of Meatballs (2009, animated film) - Visual Development
- Surf's Up (2007, animated film) - Visual Development
- Brother Bear (2003, animated film) - Layout Journeyman
- Lilo & Stitch (2002, animated film) - Layout Journeyman
- Tarzan (1999, animated film) - Layout Key Assistant
- Mulan (1998, animated film) - Layout Key Assistant
- Fantastic Four (1995, animated TV Series) - Layout Supervisor
- X-Men (1995, animated TV Series) - Layout Supervisor
- Biker Mice From Mars (1994, animated TV Series) - Layout Supervisor
