= Banjo the Woodpile Cat =

- Original theatrical poster
- Directed by: Don Bluth
- Story by: Don Bluth; Toby Bluth (both unc.)
- Produced by: Don Bluth; Gary Goldman; John Pomeroy
- Starring: Scatman Crothers; Beah Richards; Sparky Marcus; Ken Sansom
- Cinematography: Rob Maine
- Edited by: Sam Horta
- Music by: Robert F. Brunner
- Animation by: Don Bluth; Gary Goldman; John Pomeroy
- Production company: Don Bluth Productions
- Distributed by: Sunrise Entertainment (II)
- Release date: November 16, 1979 (Hollywood, California)
- Running time: 26 minutes
- Country: United States
- Language: English

Banjo the Woodpile Cat is a 1979 American indie animated short film directed by Don Bluth. It follows the story of Banjo, an overly curious and rebellious kitten. After getting in trouble, Banjo runs away from his woodpile home in his owners' farm in Payson, Utah by catching a truck to Salt Lake City.

Produced on a low budget and created in Bluth's garage and set in his childhood home of Payson, the film took four years to make and it was the first production of Don Bluth Productions, later Sullivan Bluth Studios. It premiered theatrically on November 16, 1979, and at the USA Film Festival one year later on March 28, 1980. It was released on DVD by 20th Century Fox Home Entertainment on May 20, 2014.

== Plot ==
In a woodpile on a farm in Payson, Utah, a rambunctious orange kitten named Banjo constantly makes mischief, to his family's dismay. After Banjo ignores his father's warnings of learning to mind Banjo's little sisters and, after one of Banjo's stunts nearly gets his little sisters killed, Banjo's father prepares to spank the kitten and orders Banjo to retrieve the switch that will be used against him; Banjo instead runs away. He hitches a ride on a feed truck to Salt Lake City.

In the big city, Banjo finds excitement at first, but soon he causes a massive traffic accident. He eventually retreats to the alleys, homesick and hungry during a thunderstorm. Another cat named Crazy Legs discovers Banjo and offers to help him find his way back home. During their search one snowy night, Crazy Legs and Banjo come to a nightclub and enlist the help of more cats, including a singing cat trio (sisters Cleo, Melina and Zazu) who are close with Crazy Legs. Later that night, while searching for the truck that could take him back to the farm, Banjo and Crazy Legs are chased by a pack of dogs. The pair barely escape and end up at the singing cats' home for the night.

The next morning, Banjo wakes up and hears the driver of the truck out in the street. The cats rejoice and say many goodbyes before Banjo gets on the truck and eventually reunites with his family, who are happy to see him home and more mature.

== Cast ==
- Sparky Marcus as Banjo
- Scatman Crothers as Crazy Legs
- Beah Richards as Zazu

=== Additional voices ===
- Jerry Harper as Freeman (Feed Truck Driver)
- Ken Sansom as Farmer / Warehouse Man / Papa Cat
- Ann E. Beasley as Jean
- Robin Muir as Emily
- Georgette Rampone as Mama Cat / Cleo / Melina

=== Singers ===
- Jackie Ward - Melina
- Sally Stevens - Cleo
- Sue Allen - Zazu

== Production ==
This film was started as a side project, while Don Bluth was still working at Walt Disney Productions. Bluth had previously considered producing a short film based on the fairy tale The Pied Piper of Hamelin, but felt that it was too large a production. He invited several other young animators to his house on nights and weekends to discover secrets of classical animation that he felt had been lost at Disney. The team worked in Bluth's garage. Bluth, and animators such as Gary Goldman, felt that Disney were only attempting to reduce the cost of films without paying attention to any artistic values. Eventually he resigned from Disney, along with 17 other animators, to finish this film and begin The Secret of NIMH. That bold walk-out caused a delay in the release of Disney's The Fox and the Hound which was still in mid-production. The story is partially based on one of Don Bluth's real-life experiences: while living on a farm, his family's cat, who lived in a woodpile nearby, disappeared, only to return to the farm several weeks later.

During the filming stage, it was considered to become a feature film. It included a fleshed-out villain: a scarred, cigar-smoking cat named Rocko, who bears similarities to Warren T. Rat (from An American Tail) and Carface Caruthers (from All Dogs Go to Heaven). A termite that saves Banjo from a group of young children in Salt Lake City later became Digit in An American Tail. The tone of the film was darker and more akin to All Dogs Go to Heaven, and the climactic battle between Crazy Legs and Rocko was inspired by Disney's The Jungle Book. However, it was found that padding the film and adding darker elements did not strengthen the storyline, so the filmmakers kept the film as a short.

It was considered to be made into a Christmas special, and would have featured live-action scenes of Sparky Marcus talking to Santa Claus, and the animation would have more of a Christmas theme. Don Bluth recalled: "We forced Christmas into it, and it didn't work". Despite this claim, Crazy Legs briefly wearing the Santa Claus suit, the wintry landscapes, and decorations, are still evident in the final film.

Don Bluth pitched this film, during pre-production, to then-studio head Ron W. Miller, as a future property for Disney. Seeing no value in it, Miller turned it down.

The rain and snow effects seen in this film are re-used live-action passes, thrown away by the Disney studio, in favor of cheaper and faster techniques.

== Release ==
The film was broadcast in the United States on ABC on May 1, 1982 as the lead-in program for Stanley, the Ugly Duckling. The film was rebroadcast on ABC on August 7, 1983.

== Video Game Adaptation ==
A video game version of the film under the name Banjo the Woodpile Cat Adventure Game was developed and released on the iPhone and iPod Touch by Iconic Apps in March 2009. The game was reminiscent of Bluth's animation on the Dragon's Lair franchise.

== Possible sequel ==
Although there has been interest in a revival of the film and characters, including a sequel Banjo meets the King of the Goblins, Bluth has stated that he so far wishes to leave the film behind.
