= Rodent to Stardom =

- Directed by: Alex Lovy
- Story by: Cal Howard
- Starring: Mel Blanc
- Edited by: Hal Geer
- Music by: William Lava
- Animation by: Volus Jones; Ted Bonnicksen; Laverne Harding; Ed Solomon
- Backgrounds by: Bob Abrams
- Color process: Technicolor
- Production company: Warner Bros.-Seven Arts Animation
- Distributed by: Warner Bros.-Seven Arts; Vitagraph Company of America
- Release date: September 23, 1967
- Running time: 6 minutes
- Language: English

Rodent to Stardom is a 1967 Warner Bros. Looney Tunes cartoon directed by Alex Lovy. The short was released on September 23, 1967, and stars Daffy Duck and Speedy Gonzales.

== Plot ==
Daffy is plucked for stardom by director Harvey Hassenpfeffer of Colossal Studios — or so he thinks. However, as he was in A Star Is Bored (1956), Daffy's real fate is to be the stuntman for the star, in this case Speedy Gonzales. The picture is The Nursery Rhyme Review. First, "the sky is falling"; next, the "rockabye baby" cradle falls from a treetop. Daffy realizes he needs to get rid of Speedy, so he asks for an autograph and traps Speedy in a book, which he deposits in a library. Daffy gets the love scene with Ducky Lamour, but after a number of stunts and just before the kiss, his stand-in, Speedy, takes over, and tells the duck, "There's no business like show business, eh, Señores Daffy?" Disgusted, Daffy replies, "Boy, you can say that again!" as he watches Speedy kissing Ducky on the cheek.
