= Sparky Marcus =

American former actor (born 1967)

- Born: Marcus Issoglio; December 6, 1967 (age 58); Hollywood, California, United States
- Other name: Sparkey Marcus
- Occupation: Actor
- Years active: 1973–1986

Sparky Marcus (born Marcus Issoglio; December 6, 1967) is an American former actor. Marcus, who started acting at five playing Shelby on Sigmund and the Sea Monsters (1973–1975), specialized in playing precocious children, but also worked extensively as a voice actor for Hanna-Barbera throughout the 1980s. He also appeared on The Nancy Walker Show (1976), Mary Hartman, Mary Hartman (1976–77) (Marcus played child evangelist Jimmy Joe Jeeter, who died of electrocution in the bathtub), Grandpa Goes to Washington (1978), The Bad News Bears and Goodtime Girls (1980). He retired from acting at the age of 18.

== Career ==
=== Voice acting ===
As a voice actor for cartoons, Marcus is probably best known for his role as Richie Rich from the Hanna-Barbera series Richie Rich (1980–1982). He later had regular roles as a voice actor on Shirt Tales (1982–1984), Space Stars (1981), Saturday Supercade as the voice of Dexter on Space Ace (1984), Challenge of the GoBots (1984), The Puppy's Further Adventures (1983), The Reluctant Dragon (1981), Cabbage Patch Kids: First Christmas (1984), Banjo the Woodpile Cat (1979), CBS Library (1980–1982) and The Get Along Gang (1984–86).

=== Television guest appearances ===
Marcus was a series regular on both The Nancy Walker Show (1976) and The Bad News Bears (1979). He also made numerous TV guest appearances, including on Trapper John, M.D., Happy Days, WKRP in Cincinnati, What's Happening!!, Maude, Emergency!, The Hardy Boys/Nancy Drew Mysteries, The Bob Newhart Show, Eight Is Enough and Starsky and Hutch. He is probably best remembered for his continuing role as child evangelist Jimmy Joe Jeeter on Mary Hartman, Mary Hartman, as well as his appearance as Arthur Carlson, Jr., om WKRP.

=== Film roles ===
Marcus also appeared in the feature films Freaky Friday (1976) and The Pinballs (1977), as well as in many TV movies, including The Stableboy's Christmas (1978) and Goldie and the Boxer (1979). His last movie role was a brief cameo as a bellboy in the 1983 Steve Martin comedy The Man with Two Brains.

== Filmography ==
Year	Title	Role	Notes
1973–74	Sigmund and the Sea Monsters	Shelby	Main cast (6 episodes)
1975	ABC Afterschool Special	Young Tuck	Episode: "The Skating Rink"
1975	The Last Day	Adam Spence	Television film
1975	Someone I Touched	Mathew	Television film
1975	Friendly Persuasion	Little Jess	Television film
1976	ABC Afterschool Special	Brian Varner	Episode: "The Amazing Cosmic Awareness of Duffy Moon"
1976	Emergency!	Johnny Elder	Episode: "Grateful"
1976	Mary Hartman, Mary Hartman	Jimmy Joe Jeeter	Main cast (20 episodes)
1976–77	The Nancy Walker Show	Michael Futterman	Main cast (13 episodes)
1976	Starsky & Hutch	Tommy	Episode: "Nightmare"
1976	Freaky Friday	Ben Andrews	Feature film
1977	ABC Afterschool Special	Tootie	Episode: "Very Good Friends"
1977	Instant Family	Alexander Beane	Television pilot
1977	Eight Is Enough		Episode: "Double Trouble"
1977	Insight	Jeffrey Drill	Episode: "Christmas 2025"
1977	The Bob Newhart Show	Billy	Episode: "Carlin's New Suit"
1977	ABC Afterschool Special	Thomas J.	Episode: "The Pinballs"
1977	The Hardy Boys/Nancy Drew Mysteries	Charles	Episode: "Will the Real Santa Claus...?"
1978	This Is the Life	The Stableboy	Episode: "The Stableboy's Christmas"
1978	Maude	Ian Harmon	Episode: "Arthur's Grandson"
1978–79	Grandpa Goes to Washington	Kevin Kelley Jr.	Main cast (7 episodes)
1979–80	The Bad News Bears	Leslie Ogilvie	Main cast (26 episodes)
1979	What's Happening!!	Danny	Episode: "First Class Coach"
1979	WKRP in Cincinnati	Arthur Carlson Jr.	Episode: "Young Master Carlson"
1979	Banjo the Woodpile Cat	Banjo (voice)	Animated short film
1979	Goldie and the Boxer	Petey	Television film
1980	The Furious Flycycle	Melvin Spitznagle (voice)	Animated short film
1980	Goodtime Girls	Skeeter	Episodes: "Homefront" and "Too Many Fiances"
1980	Happy Days	Billy	Episode: "The Hucksters"
1980	CBS Library	Melvin Spitznagle (voice)	Episode: "The Incredible Book Escape"
1980–82	The Richie Rich/Scooby-Doo Show	Richie Rich (voice)	Richie Rich segment (21 episodes)
1981	The Reluctant Dragon	The Boy (voice)	Animated short film
1981	Goldie and the Boxer Go to Hollywood	Petey	Television film
1981	CBS Library	The Boy (voice)	Episode: "Misunderstood Monsters"
1981	ABC Weekend Special	Petey the Puppy (voice)	Episode: "The Puppy Saves the Circus"
1981–82	Space Stars	Dorno (voice)	The Herculoids segment (11 episodes)
1982	Trapper John, M.D.	Richard Tobin	Episode: "The Peter Pan Syndrome"
1982	Shirt Tales	T.J. Tiger (voice)	10 episodes
1982–83	The Pac-Man/Little Rascals/Richie Rich Show	Richie Rich (voice)	Richie Rich segment (16 episodes)
1983	The Man with Two Brains	Bellboy	Feature film
1983–84	The Monchhichis/Little Rascals/Richie Rich Show	Richie Rich (voice)	Richie Rich segment (4 episodes)
1984	Saturday Supercade	Dexter (voice)	Space Ace segment (13 episodes)
1984	Cabbage Patch Kids: First Christmas	Xavier Roberts (voice)	Television special
1984–85	The Get Along Gang	Montgomery Moose (voice)	13 episodes
1984–85	Challenge of the GoBots	Nick Burns (voice)	7 episodes

=== Post-acting career ===
Going by his given name of Marcus Issoglio, as of 2020 he had been working as a physical therapist for over three decades in northern California. Issoglio is married, with one son.
