= Space Stars =

American animated television series

- Title card
- Genre: Superhero fiction; Adventure; Fantasy; Science fiction; Comedy-drama
- Directed by: Ray Patterson; George Gordon; Rudy Zamora
- Voices of: Michael Bell; Virginia Gregg; Darryl Hickman; Allan Lurie; Sparky Marcus; Don Messick; Gary Owens; David Raynr; Mike Road; Steve J. Spears; Alexandra Stoddart; B. J. Ward; Lennie Weinrib; Frank Welker; Michael Winslow
- Narrated by: Keene Curtis
- Theme music composer: Hoyt Curtin
- Composer: Hoyt Curtin
- Country of origin: United States
- Original language: English
- No. of episodes: 11 (66 segments)

Production
- Executive producers: William Hanna; Joseph Barbera
- Producers: Oscar Dufau; Gerald Baldwin
- Running time: 60 minutes
- Production company: Hanna-Barbera Productions

Original release
- Network: NBC
- Release: September 12, 1981 – January 8, 1982

Space Stars is a 60-minute American Saturday morning animated program block produced by Hanna-Barbera Productions and broadcast on NBC from September 12, 1981, to January 8, 1982.

Space Stars was narrated by Keene Curtis and featured five cartoon segments each week:

- Space Ghost (2 segments, 6 minutes each)
- The Herculoids (1 segment, 10 minutes)
- Teen Force (1 segment, 7 minutes)
- Astro and the Space Mutts (1 segment, 7 minutes)
- Space Stars Finale (1 segment, 7 minutes)

The cartoons would occasionally cross over into one another. Space Ghost and The Herculoids both had their own respective series in the 1960s. Teen Force and Astro and the Space Mutts were both new segments, although the Astro character was the family dog from The Jetsons.

== Opening title narration ==
The opening title narration was provided by Michael Rye and consisted of the following:

"Space Stars! A galaxy of heroes teamed together in an interstellar battle against evil! Blast off on adventures as big as the cosmos itself! Race, poised on the edge of time, with Space Ghost and his young friends! Streak through the universe with Space Ace, Astro and the Space Mutts as they spring into action! And somewhere deep in space, super-danger threatens the Teen Force! Join the famed Herculoids in their new battles to preserve peace on the planet Quasar! Now...get set for 60 laser-blasting minutes of action, adventure, fun...on Space Stars!"

== Plot and segments ==
=== Space Ghost ===
A total of 22 episodes were produced for Space Ghost (two segments aired each week), featuring a new assortment of villains, including an evil version of Space Ghost called Space Spectre (who came from an alternate universe). The Phantom Cruiser and its Scout Ship were also given sleeker and more modernized looks. Space Ghost often came to the aid of the Herculoids and vice versa (as in the original Space Ghost series' "Council of Doom" storyline, where they teamed up for the first time). They also frequently crossed paths with the Teen Force and it appeared that Jan and Teen Force member Kid Comet were dating as well. Gary Owens reprised his role as Space Ghost, but Tim Matheson was replaced by Steve Spears as the voice of Jace, Ginny Tyler was replaced by Alexandra Stoddart as the voice of Jan, and Don Messick was replaced by Frank Welker as the vocal effects for Blip.

==== Episodes ====
#	Title	Original air date	Summary
1	"Microworld"	September 12, 1981	The Toymaker has shrunk the planet of Cetia 3 where Jan, Jace and Blip are vacationing and threatens to remove its atmosphere if Space Ghost does not surrender his Power Bands to him.
2	"Planet of the Space Monkeys"	September 12, 1981	Upon being neglected by Space Ghost, Jan, and Jace, Blip runs away and lands on a planet filled with space monkeys.
3	"The Starfly"	September 19, 1981	Jan, Jace, and Blip find a Starfly on the Ghost Planet. What they do not know is that Starflies evolve into Starbeasts as one is attacking the Space Transport Ship Ulysses.
4	"The Antimatter Man"	September 19, 1981	An accident with an anti-matter experiment transforms scientist Dr. Contra into the Anti-Matter Man. Now Space Ghost, Jan, Jace, and Blip must make a perilous journey through the Galactic Core to return Dr. Conta to normal.
5	"City in Space"	September 26, 1981	To stop for supplies, Space Ghost, Jan, Jace, and Blip stop at a floating city in space that is heading for the sun. When the city ends up getting closer to the sun, Space Ghost turns to Elektra to help get it away from the sun.
6	"The Toymaker"	September 26, 1981	While on vacation on a distant planet, Jan, Jace, and Blip are captured by mechanical knights and are taken to a spaceship run by the Toymaker. It is up to Space Ghost to save them.
7	"Nomads"	October 3, 1981	Lord Ibal and his people are attacked by a giant Space Snake and are saved by Space Ghost. Space Ghost later learns that they are really robots seeking to conquer the galaxy with their disguised warships.
8	"The Space Dragons"	October 3, 1981	A fleet of Space Dragon Ships have been attacking mining operations and stealing Caburite, an extremely powerful element that can be refined into fuel. Space Ghost discovers that the Space Dragon Ships were created by Repto, who plans to use the Caburite in a plot to turn the refined Caburite into fuel for his Space Dragon Ships in a plot to take over the galaxy.
9	"Eclipse Woman"	October 10, 1981	Eclipse Woman is draining energy from the planet Halcion. With help from Kid Comet, Space Ghost, Jan, Jace, and Blip fight Eclipse Woman to keep her from draining Halcion of its power.
10	"Attack of the Space Sharks"	October 10, 1981	A pair of shark-like warships are attacking spaceships. As Space Ghost battles them, Jan, Jace and Blip are captured by the Space Sharks and discover that the shark-like Remora and his soldiers from the water planet Liquo have been capturing ships and its passengers for souvenirs.
11	"Time Chase"	October 17, 1981	Jan and Kid Comet land on Coros IV when it is in its prehistoric state when Kid Comet uses his powers to travel faster than time. At the same time, Space Ghost, Jace, and Blip pursue a space pirate named Barbos to Coros IV and end up going through a Time Arch to Coros IV in its prehistoric state as well.
12	"The Haunted Space Station"	October 17, 1981	Upon receiving a distress signal from the Outworld Station, Space Ghost, Jan, Jace, and Blip investigate. They soon discover that a Forvalokka (a soul vampire) has turned its crew into zombies that obey his every command and will soon become Forvalokkas themselves.
13	"Time of the Giants"	October 24, 1981	After capturing the space pirate Krugar, Space Ghost, Jan, Jace, and Blip fly the Phantom Cruiser through a space cloud that shrinks them. Krugar escapes from them when they are shrinking and it is up to a miniature Space Ghost to catch Krugar.
14	"The Sorceress"	October 24, 1981	The Sorceress plans to use her magic (which is based on technology) to take control of Space Ghost's mind and marry him. It is up to Jan, Jace, and Blip to save Space Ghost.
15	"Space Spectre"	October 31, 1981	Space Spectre, an evil version of Space Ghost from an alternate dimension, arrives through a black hole into Space Ghost's dimension. Now Space Ghost must defeat Space Spectre and send him back to his own dimension.
16	"The Big Freeze"	October 31, 1981	Feron is freezing the planet Vanderfor with his freeze ray and plans to do the same to all planets in the galaxy in order to colonize them for his people.
17	"Devilship"	November 7, 1981	When Jace is investigating a shuttle during an investigation, he ends up under the evil control of the Wizard. Now it is up to Space Ghost to free Jace from the Wizard's control.
18	"The Deadly Comet"	November 7, 1981	The Commander is using remote-controlled comets to attack ships. Space Ghost calls upon Kid Comet to help stop the Commander before he sends a comet towards the Galactic Council.
19	"Spacecube of Doom"	November 14, 1981	After helping the Herculoids free a mammoth from a tar pit, Space Ghost discovers that a space cube is stealing all the precious metals in the universe. When the Phantom Cruiser is also stolen, Space Ghost discover that the robot Cubus is wanting to save the logical universe with his super computer Ultima and brainwash the creatures of the universe to think logically.
20	"The Time Master"	November 14, 1981	A Time Satellite fires beams on the planet Glax-3 that turns back time on Glax-3. Space Ghost discovers that Tempus the Time Master is behind this in a plot to harvest Luxor in order to use it to build a Time Shredder.
21	"Web of the Wizard"	November 21, 1981	The Wizard uses a device to make Space Ghost, Jan, Jace, and Blip see illusions. He plans to have the Phantom Cruiser crash into a planet when it is chasing an illusion.
22	"The Shadow People"	November 21, 1981	Space Ghost, Jan, Jace, Blip, and Elektra investigate Rombula Station (a floating space refinery) when its people have taken flight from it. They soon discover that the refinery has been invaded by the Shadow People.

=== The Herculoids ===
As a departure from the original series, this incarnation of The Herculoids had story direction and content similar to Jonny Quest and Space Ghost. This series takes place on a far-away planet named Quasar in the land of Amzot (the planet was only named as such in this series, though Amzot was first mentioned by name in "The Time Creatures", an episode of the original series). Eleven episodes were produced. Mike Road and Virginia Gregg reprised their roles as Zandor and Tara, respectively. Ted Eccles was replaced by Sparky Marcus as Dorno. Mike Road and Don Messick also reprised their roles as the voices of the Herculoids.

==== Episodes ====
#	Title	Original air date	Summary
1	"The Firebird"	September 12, 1981	A volcano erupts on Quasar, revealing a firebird who has taken up residency in the volcano's crater and threatens the Herculoids.
2	"The Ice Monster"	September 19, 1981	Dorno is feeling depressed when Zandor treats him like a child because of his size and age. At the same time, an ancient robotic monster emerges from a block of ice-and it is indestructible.
3	"The Snake Riders"	September 26, 1981	Dorno and Gleep discover a plot by the Snake Riders to take over the planet. It is up to the Herculoids to stop their plans for planetary conquest.
4	"The Invisibles"	October 3, 1981	A chunk of magnilite lands in the Lost Lake of Quasar. Before long, the Herculoids go up against enemies that they cannot see. Zandor soon learns from the Zelos King Zel that his son Eezo and his followers might be the culprits—a theory proven correct when Space Ghost arrives to return the magnilite to space.
5	"The Energy Creature"	October 10, 1981	A meteorite containing an energy creature lands on Quasar. When it imprisons creatures in its coils, it takes on their forms and properties also.
6	"The Purple Menace"	October 17, 1981	Glowing purple rocks have brought to life purple vines that cause havoc.
7	"The Buccaneer"	October 24, 1981	The Buccaneer and his band of pirates arrive on Quasar to look for buried treasure.
8	"The Thunderbolt"	October 31, 1981	Saiju, a benevolent creature with a voracious appetite, comes upon some electrical-charged rocks and turns into a living electrical monster upon eating them. The Herculoids learn that the effects of those rocks are temporary and try to get Saiju back to normal.
9	"Return of the Ancients"	November 7, 1981	The descendants/survivors of a highly developed race that was wiped out on Quasar return to the planet after a 1,000-year mission, and they are not too happy to find out that their civilization is gone.
10	"Space Trappers"	November 14, 1981	The Space Trappers arrive on Quasar and capture the Herculoids for their intergalactic circus.
11	"Mindbender"	November 21, 1981	While playing, Dorno, Gloop, and Gleep discover and unearth a metal cylinder which contains a big-brained alien. When they release him, he reveals himself to be a member of a race that ruled Quasar thousands of years ago. It is up to the Herculoids to reseal the Mindbender.

=== Teen Force ===
Teen Force focused on three superhumanly gifted young students who hail from an unknown alternate universe which is located beyond the confines of the mysterious Black Hole X, which serves as a gateway into the universe in which the other main characters from Space Stars exist.

The Teen Force consists of Kid Comet, who possesses tremendous levels of superhuman speed, enabling him move at speeds exceeding the speed of light, and can even move quickly enough to travel through time; Moleculad, who can control his molecular structure for various effects; and Elektra, who possesses the psionic disciplines of telepathy, telekinesis, and teleportation. Accompanying them are a pair of diminutive blue-skinned aliens named Plutem and Glax, also known as the Astromites. Their principal enemy in the series is Uglor, a mutant native and tyrannical ruler of the planet Uris (whose inhabitants are a race of evolved simians) in Galaxy Q-2. Uglor's mutation granted him bird-like wings and the ability to generate destructive energy blasts from his bionic eyes, which allowed him to see through Space Ghost's Inviso-Power and Elektra's telepathic illusions.

==== Episodes ====
#	Title	Original air date	Summary
1	"Nebulon"	September 12, 1981	In his latest plan for galactic conquest, Uglor creates an energy creature called Nebulon. When Nebulon becomes too powerful, Uglor ends up working together with the Teen Force to stop it.
2	"The Death Ray"	September 19, 1981	Uglor plots to destroy Black Hole X, the gateway into the Space Stars universe used by the Teen Force, in order to trap them in his dimension and subsequently destroy them.
3	"Prison Planet"	September 26, 1981	The Teen Force must travel to Maldor, Uglor's prison planet, in order to rescue the Solvanite president Krisa.
4	"Trojan Teen Force"	October 3, 1981	The Teen Force must rescue the Troy galaxy's royal family from Uglor's clutches and prevent him from marrying the Trojan princess, Keena.
5	"Decoy of Doom"	October 10, 1981	Under the guise of a phony distress call, the Teen Force are seized by Uglor's magnetron gravity warp where he hopes to drain the heroes' powers and add their energy to his new weapon.
6	"Elektra's Twin"	October 17, 1981	Using a false distress signal, Uglor manages to capture the Teen Force with the aid of a doppelganger of Elektra. With the Teen Force imprisoned, Uglor plots to destroy Helios, the star-sun of the Free Planets, from his space platform Techno.
7	"Uglor's Power Play"	October 24, 1981	Uglor manages to mimic the Teen Force's powers through the use of his energizer in order to conquer the space station Centrex as well as the rest of the galaxy.
8	"Ultimate Battle"	October 31, 1981	Uglor challenges the Teen Force to a battle on the desolate and hostile continent of Evil Island. The Teen Force discover that its creatures consider humans evil after they were convinced of this by Uglor.
9	"The Space Slime"	November 7, 1981	The Teen Force battle Uglor's new bio-weapon that threatens countless civilizations unless they surrender to his tyrannical rule.
10	"Wordstar"	November 14, 1981	The Teen Force become embroiled in a race against time when Uglor learns of the existence of an ancient object of tremendous power called the Wordstar. He seeks to wrest control of it from its guardian, the cosmic entity known as Ananda.
11	"Pandora's Warp"	November 21, 1981	Uglor plots to destroy Fredonia, a space station/power plant that provides vital energy to the rebel worlds that oppose his tyranny. To that end, he opens a rift to the Dimension of Magic and recruits Trentino the Black Knight and his legion of demons to aid him.

=== Astro and the Space Mutts ===
Astro and the Space Mutts features Astro, the family dog from The Jetsons. He teams up with two other dogs named Cosmo and Dipper, led by their human leader Space Ace. Together, the trio act as galactic police officers and travel through outer space. Don Messick reprised his role as Astro. Unlike the original cartoon, Astro spoke normally instead of using the "R" consonant mutation in his dialogue.

==== Episodes ====
#	Title	Original air date	Summary
1	"Will the Real Mr. Galaxy Please Stand Up"	September 12, 1981	Mr. Galaxy has stolen the First Galaxy Bank's vault. Space Ace and the Space Mutts track him to Muscle Beach Moon to get the vault back.
2	"Reverso"	September 19, 1981	In his plan for universal domination, Reverso crashes the Spaceman's Ball at the Space Palace and demands that he be made ruler of the universe or else everything will end up in reverse.
3	"The Education of Puglor"	September 26, 1981	Uglor gives his nephew Puglor his simian strength and laser glare for 12 hours in a plot to take over the resort world of Solar Springs.
4	"Wonder Dog"	October 3, 1981	When the Lieutenant gives Space Ace a robot mutt named Brucie the Robot Wonder Dog for a trial run, this causes problems for the Space Mutts. Meanwhile, the Scavenger steals the Aceship from Space Ace so that he can eliminate Space Ace for Lord Raider.
5	"Menace of the Magnet Maniac"	October 10, 1981	Mario Magnetti is on a metal-robbing spree.
6	"The Night of the Crab"	October 17, 1981	The Crab crashes the Space Awards at the Space Palace and steals the awards. It is up to Space Ace and the Space Mutts to get the award back and defeat him.
7	"Rock Punk"	October 24, 1981	When Rock Punk steals the recently created Mount Spacemore, Space Ace and the Space Mutts end up going after Rock Punk to keep him from completing his rock collection.
8	"The Greatest Show Off Earth"	October 31, 1981	The Spaceling Brothers Circus has been abducted by the Cosmic Clown. Space Ace and the Space Mutts follow him to Galaxy Q-2 to get it back and defeat the Cosmic Clown.
9	"Jewlie Newstar"	November 7, 1981	Renowned jewel thief Jewlie Newstar steals the Jupiter Jewel from the Interplanetary Museum. It is up to Space Ace and the Space Mutts to reclaim the Jupiter Jewel and defeat her.
10	"Galactic Vac is Back"	November 14, 1981	Galactic Vac is sucking up everything in the galaxy.
11	"Rampage of the Zodiac Man"	November 21, 1981	The Zodiac Man steals the Stardust Constellation Ring from the Moona Lisa Museum.

=== Space Stars Finale ===
Space Stars Finale was the last segment where Space Ghost, the Herculoids, the Teen Force, and Astro and the Space Mutts team up to battle the scourges of the universe.

==== Episodes ====
#	Title	Original air date	Summary
1	"Polaris"	September 12, 1981	Jace, Elektra, and Moleculad pursue the malevolent Polaris while Jan, Kid Comet, and the Astromites try to rescue Space Ghost and Blip from a space warp dimension created by Polaris.
2	"Dimension of Doom"	September 19, 1981	Space Ghost and the Teen Force must rescue the mutated Jan and Jace from Uglor and his dimension distorter weapon.
3	"Worlds in Collision"	September 26, 1981	With help from Elektra, Space Ghost and the Herculoids learn that Uglor has set the Ghost Planet on a collision course with Quasar in order to destroy both groups of heroes.
4	"Mindwitch"	October 3, 1981	Space Ghost and the Herculoids battle a powerful evil witch who is accidentally revived by nomads and aims to conquer all of Quasar.
5	"Magnus"	October 10, 1981	Space Ghost and the Herculoids must deal with the villain Magnus and a mysterious childlike alien whose toys are reaping havoc on Quasar.
6	"The Crystal Menace"	October 17, 1981	In pursuit of the menacing Crystal Cyborg, Space Ghost and the Herculoids join forces against this enemy in order to prevent all life on Quasar from being crystallized.
7	"The Olympians"	October 24, 1981	The Herculoids and the Teen Force battle Uglor and his Olympian warriors to prevent him from stealing all of Quasar's energy rock deposits.
8	"Endangered Species"	October 31, 1981	Dorno and Zok must team up with the Space Mutts to help rescue Space Ace, Zandor and Tara who were kidnapped by the sinister Borox for his alien zoo.
9	"The Outworlder"	November 7, 1981	Space Ghost and the Teen Force face double trouble when they tackle an energy vampire and a crazed freighter captain bent on saving his ship at all costs-including risking the lives of everyone on board.
10	"Uglor Conquers the Universe"	November 14, 1981	By absorbing the cosmic energies of a neutron galaxy, Uglor obtains omnipotent power over the universe. The Teen Force, along with the Herculoids, must discover the only way to defeat him-which is on the planet Quasar.
11	"The Cosmic Mousetrap"	November 21, 1981	A hostile artificial intelligence named Megamind captures Space Ghost, Jace, Blip, and Elektra in an attempt to gauge the heroes' weaknesses with a series of perilous tests. Jan and the rest of the Teen Force attempt to rescue them from their captor.

== Voice cast ==
- Michael Bell – Space Ace, Mario Magnetti (in "Menace of the Magnet Maniac"), the Scavenger (in "Wonder Dog")
- Keene Curtis – Narrator
- Richard Erdman –
- June Foray - The Mindwitch (in "Mindwitch")
- Kathy Garver - Krisa (in "Prison Planet")
- Virginia Gregg – Tara
- Darryl Hickman – Kid Comet
- Casey Kasem – Announcer
- Allan Lurie – Uglor
- Sparky Marcus – Dorno
- Chuck McCann –
- Don Messick – Astro, Gloop, Gleep, Director (in "The Education of Puglor"), Reverso (in "Reverso")
- Gary Owens – Space Ghost
- David Raynr (credited as David Hubbard) – Moleculad
- Mike Road – Zandor, Tundro, Zok, Igoo
- Stanley Ralph Ross – Buccaneer (in "The Buccaneer")
- Michael Rye - Opening Narration
- Steve J. Spears – Jace
- John Stephenson – Space Spectre (in "Space Spectre"), Elder (in "City in Space"), Jev (in "City in Space")
- Alexandra Stoddart – Jan
- B. J. Ward – Elektra
- Lennie Weinrib – Dipper, Brucie (in "Wonder Dog"), Puglor (in "The Education of Puglor")
- Frank Welker – Cosmo, Blip, Wizard (in "Web of the Wizard," "Devilship"), Computer (in "City in Space"), Crab (in "The Night of the Crab"), Cubus (in "Spacecube of Doom"), Destroyer (in "Nomads"), Feron (in "The Big Freeze"), Galactic Vac (in "Galactic Vac is Back"), Lord Raider (in "Wonder Dog"), Noxie (in "Nomads"), Repto (in "The Space Dragons"), Rock Punk (in "Rock Punk"), Shadow Creature (in "The Shadow People"), Starfly (in "The Starfly"), Starbeast (in "The Starfly")
- Michael Winslow – Glax, Plutem

== Syndication ==
In syndication as a 30-minute series, USA Network had one segment each of Space Ghost, Teen Force and The Herculoids, but the Astro and the Space Mutts segments were never shown.

The Space Ghost, The Herculoids and Astro and the Space Mutts segments have been seen on Cartoon Network and Boomerang, but not the Teen Force segments. Furthermore, the series has never been shown in its entirety on Cartoon Network, Toonami or Boomerang. These shorts were only broadcast on occasion as an interstitial segment between shows on Boomerang until the mid-2010s.

The Space Ghost and The Herculoids segments air on MeTV Toons as The New Space Ghost and Herculoids Show starting February 7, 2026.

Astro and the Space Mutts was formerly available on Tubi. It will later return on an unknown date.

== Home video ==
On October 8, 2013, Warner Archive released Space Stars: The Complete Series on DVD in region 1 as part of their Hanna–Barbera Classics Collection. This is a Manufacture-on-Demand (MOD) release, available exclusively through Warner's online store and Amazon.com.

== Popular culture ==
Elektra appeared in the Jellystone! season three episode "Girl, You My Friend!" voiced by Ulka Simone Mohanty. She is an actress in the titular Sex and the City-esque series on Jellystone Television and has electric powers rather than psychic powers.
