= Chibikko Kaiju Yadamon =

1967–68 Japanese anime series

ちびっこ怪獣ヤダモン
- Genre: Comedy
- Anime television series
- Directed by: Ushio Souji
- Written by: Keisuke Fujikawa, Daisaku Ikuta, Fujigo Wakabayashi
- Music by: Seichiro Uno
- Studio: P Productions
- Original network: Fuji TV
- Original run: October 2, 1967 – March 25, 1968
- Episodes: 26
- Manga
- Written by: Ushio Souji
- Illustrated by: Go Nagai
- Published by: Kodansha
- Magazine: Bokura
- Original run: December 1967 – July 1968
- Volumes: 1

Chibikko Kaiju Yadamon (ちびっこ怪獣ヤダモン; "Little Monster Yadamon") is a Japanese black-and-white anime series created by Ushio Souji, an alias of Tomio Sagisu. Yadamon is also famous for its manga adaptation, which was the second professional work of Go Nagai.
