= The Land Before Time IX: Journey to Big Water =

- DVD cover
- Directed by: Charles Grosvenor
- Written by: Dev Ross
- Based on: Characters by Judy Freudberg; Tony Geiss
- Produced by: Charles Grosvenor
- Starring: John Ingle; Kenneth Mars; Miriam Flynn; Thomas Dekker; Anndi McAfee; Aria Noelle Curzon; Rob Paulsen; Tress MacNeille; Jeff Bennett
- Edited by: Jay Bixsen
- Music by: Michael Tavera; James Horner (music from The Land Before Time)
- Production company: Universal Cartoon Studios
- Distributed by: Universal Studios Home Video
- Release date: December 10, 2002
- Running time: 75 minutes
- Country: United States
- Language: English

The Land Before Time IX: Journey to Big Water (aka Journey to the Big Water) is a 2002 direct-to-video animated adventure musical film and the ninth film in The Land Before Time series. It was produced and directed by Charles Grosvenor. This is also the last film to use the soundtrack composed by James Horner. The film was produced by Universal Cartoon Studios and released by Universal Studios Home Video on December 10, 2002. During the year this was released, Universal brought back on DVD, for the first time, two of the previous The Land Before Time films: The Great Valley Adventure and The Time of the Great Giving.

When heavy rains create a mysterious "new water", Littlefoot sets off to explore the Great Valley. He quickly becomes friends with Mo the mischievous Ophthalmosaurus who has been isolated from his pod by the weather. When Littlefoot and friends get separated from their parents because of an Earthshake, they help Mo get back home to the Big Water, while avoiding a hungry "Sharptooth Swimmer". On the way, Littlefoot and Mo discuss such interesting and see dangerous things like imaginary friends, the Sharptooth Swimmer, the concept of loneliness, and the true meaning of a brother.

== Plot ==
After a period of harsh rain, the Great Valley is partially flooded and covered in debris. Littlefoot tries to play with his friends, but they are preoccupied: Cera and her father are removing a large log from their nesting area, Ducky and Spike are relocating their nest with their family, and Petrie has gotten a cold. A bored Littlefoot wishes for a brother, but eventually explores on his own and discovers a large area flooded by the rains. The adults advise their children to stay away, fearing that dangerous creatures from the outside may have been washed into the Valley. However, Littlefoot returns and meets Mo, a playful young Ophthalmosaurus that had been caught in the floodwater.

Littlefoot quickly strikes a friendship with Mo and describes him as his mud brother. His other friends also eventually befriend him. Mo explains that he is from the Big Water, and he swam into the Valley during the flooding. He confirms that he is alone, but soon after, a Liopleurodon attacks the group. Littlefoot requests help from the adults to help Mo return home, but they refuse, not wanting to risk leaving the Valley to aid an outsider. A subsequent earthshake separates the children and Mo from the rest of the Valley, but it also imprisons the Sharptooth in an underwater cavern. Unable to return, they decide to take Mo home on their own.

The children follow a river that they believe leads to the ocean. A Diplodocus mother allows them to take refuge at her nest for the night, and the friends are present to witness the hatching of her offspring. The next day, Littlefoot and the others realize that they are near the ocean, as they have begun to taste salt in the water. Suddenly, the Sharptooth – who has escaped from the cave – attacks them that night. The land – which surrounds the river – is steep and slick with mud, and the children are unable to escape. Mo distracts the Sharptooth and lures it further down the river. Reappearing the next day, Mo explains that the Sharptooth had smelled the ocean in the distance and abandoned the chase, choosing to return to the sea.

The children reach the ocean, but Mo is saddened to learn that his friends must depart. He wishes to remain with them, but the others explain that he cannot, and Littlefoot reminds Mo that the two will always be brothers. Mo reunites with his family and asks them for directions to the smoky mountains, as the children know how to find the Valley from that location. Before leaving, Mo offers to show Littlefoot his home. Littlefoot accepts the offer, and is amazed by the underwater world's beauty. Littlefoot and his friends say goodbye to Mo and return home, where they are greeted by the adults.

== Cast ==
- Thomas Dekker as Littlefoot
- Anndi McAfee as Cera
- Aria Noelle Curzon as Ducky
- Jeff Bennett as Petrie
- Rob Paulsen as Spike / Mo
- Kenneth Mars as Grandpa Longneck
- Miriam Flynn as Grandma Longneck / Diplodocus Mom
- Tress MacNeille as Ducky's mother / Petrie's mother
- John Ingle as Narrator / Topsy

== Production ==
By June 2000, a ninth film in the Land Before Time series was in development by Universal. This was the first Land Before Time film in which the eggs are animated; they can be seen when Littlefoot and his friends find Ducky in a female Diplodocus's nest. When the eggs hatch, hand-drawn elements are mapped onto each egg.

== Music ==
The music score of this film was composed by Michael Tavera. The music that plays in the background when the gang cool off is the cheese factory scene music from An American Tail: The Treasure of Manhattan Island. This is the second and last time the music is used in the series, after The Land Before Time VIII: The Big Freeze. It is also the last time James Horner's original themes (including instrumental uses of "If We Hold on Together") from the first film are heard in a Land Before Time film, despite Tavera's rearrangements of Horner's old themes still being heard in some shots of Invasion of the Tinysauruses.

Big Water is borrowed from the fifth film, The Mysterious Island, in which the songwriters also collaborated. This was the first The Land Before Time film to contain more than three songs.

All track are written by Michele Brourman and Amanda McBroom.

No.	Title	Performer(s)	Length
1.	"Chanson D'Ennui (Song of Boredom)"	Thomas Dekker, Anndi McAfee, Aria Curzon & Jeff Bennett
2.	"Imaginary Friend"	Thomas Dekker, Anndi McAfee, Aria Curzon & Jeff Bennett
3.	"Big Water"	Thomas Dekker, Anndi McAfee, Aria Curzon & Jeff Bennett
4.	"No One Has to Be Alone"	Thomas Dekker, Anndi McAfee, Aria Curzon, Jeff Bennett & Miriam Flynn
5.	"No One Has to Be Alone (Reprise)"	Donny Osmond
6.	"If We Hold on Together"

== Release ==
- December 10, 2002 (VHS and DVD)
- December 2, 2003 (VHS and DVD - 9 Movie Dino Pack)
- February 7, 2006 (DVD - 2 Dino-Riffic Adventures)
- August 5, 2008 (Carrying Case DVD with Fun Activity Book - 2 Dino-Riffic Adventures - Universal Watch on the Go)

== Reception ==
Bruce Fretts of Entertainment Weekly gave the film a "B" and wrote: "Exposing innocents' ears to Donny Osmond (who whimpers the syrupy ballad 'No One Has to Be Alone' over the closing credits) borders on child endangerment". In August 2014, the New York Post ranked each of the 13 Land Before Time films released up to that point, placing Journey to Big Water at number 6 and writing that it "provides a breath of fresh air" by introducing underwater species.

Thomas Dekker received an award for "Outstanding Young Voice-Over" at the 24th Young Artist Awards in 2003 for his role as Littlefoot. It was nominated for "Outstanding Achievement in an Animated Home Video Production" at the 30th Annie Awards that same year, losing to Rolie Polie Olie: The Great Defender of Fun. Journey to Big Water received five nominations from the DVD Exclusive Awards in 2002, including "Best Animated DVD Premiere Movie", "Best Animated Character Performance", "Best Original Score", and two "Best Original Song" nods.

Award	Date	Nomination	Nominee	Result
Annie Award	February 1, 2003	Outstanding Achievement in an Animated Home Video Production	The Land Before Time IX	Nominated
DVD Exclusive Awards	2002	Best Animated DVD Premiere Movie	Charles Grosvenor (producer)	Nominated
DVD Exclusive Awards	2002	Best Animated Character Performance	Kenneth Mars (voice, Grandpa), Bunis Yang (character animation, Grandpa)	Nominated
DVD Exclusive Awards	2002	Best Original Song	"Imaginary Friend" performed by Aria Curzon, Anndi McAfee, Thomas Dekker, and Jeff Bennett	Nominated
DVD Exclusive Awards	2002	Best Original Song	"No One Has to Be Alone (End Title Version)" performed by Donny Osmond	Nominated
DVD Exclusive Awards	2002	Best Original Score	Michael Tavera (composer)	Nominated
Young Artist Award	March 29, 2003	Outstanding Young Voice-Over	Thomas Dekker (Littlefoot)	Won

== See also ==
- List of films featuring dinosaurs
