= The Land Before Time VII: The Stone of Cold Fire =

2000 animated film by Charles Grosvenor

- DVD cover
- Directed by: Charles Grosvenor
- Written by: Len Uhley
- Produced by: Charles Grosvenor
- Starring: Jeff Glen Bennett; Anndi McAfee; Thomas Dekker; Aria Noelle Curzon; Rob Paulsen; Kenneth Mars; Miriam Flynn; John Ingle; Tress MacNeille; Jim Cummings; Charles Kimbrough; Patti Deutsch; Michael York
- Edited by: Jay Bixsen
- Music by: Michael Tavera; James Horner (music from The Land Before Time)
- Production company: Universal Cartoon Studios
- Distributed by: Universal Studios Home Video
- Release date: December 5, 2000
- Running time: 75 minutes
- Country: United States
- Language: English

The Land Before Time VII: The Stone of Cold Fire is a 2000 American direct-to-video animated adventure musical drama and the seventh film in The Land Before Time series, produced and directed by Charles Grosvenor. It stars the voices of Jeff Glen Bennett, Anndi McAfee, Thomas Dekker, Aria Noelle Curzon, Rob Paulsen, Kenneth Mars, Miriam Flynn, John Ingle, Tress MacNeille, Jim Cummings, Charles Kimbrough, Patti Deutsch and Michael York.

The Land Before Time VII: The Stone of Cold Fire was produced by Universal Cartoon Studios and released by Universal Studios Home Video on December 5, 2000. This was the only Land Before Time film to be written by Len Uhley. This is the first installment to not have John Ingle's narration. Starting with The Stone of Cold Fire, Taiwanese-American studio Wang Film Productions takes over the overseas animation work on the entire Land Before Time series until the 2007–08 television series of the same name and The Land Before Time XIII: The Wisdom of Friends, after South Korean studio AKOM provided their animation for the last five direct-to-video sequels: The Great Valley Adventure, The Time of the Great Giving, Journey Through the Mists, The Mysterious Island, and The Secret of Saurus Rock.

== Plot ==
Late one night, Littlefoot sees a meteor fall from the sky and crashing into the volcano Threehorn's Peak. When Littlefoot describes it the next morning, the adults in Great Valley do not take it seriously, except for two mysterious newcomer dinosaurs, the rainbow-beaked and long-necked "Rainbow Faces". The Rainbow Faces tell them of possibilities of wonders beyond what they know, and suggest the rock may be a magic stone of cold fire. Littlefoot tries to tell Cera's father he knows where the flying rock was and how to find it. But Cera's father warns Littlefoot of the Mysterious Beyond, especially parts with volcanoes, are off-limits. Littlefoot's grandfather agrees and tells Littlefoot that until some far-walkers leave the Great Valley, it would be better for them to not worry about the flying rock.

Pterano, the outcast uncle of Littlefoot's friend Petrie, overhears the conversation and conspires to find the rock to use its powers to control the valley. Pterano gets Petrie, who idolizes him, to tell him the rock's location. Littlefoot's friend Ducky overhears Pterano's plan, but before she can warn the others, Pterano and his cronies, Rinkus and Sierra, capture her and set out to find the Stone. Upon discovering Ducky's abduction, the adults tell the young ones how Pterano previously led some of their herd during their search for the valley and encountered a pack of Deinonychus. Despite Pterano's ability to escape, the event left him emotionally scarred and he was ordered to leave the herd as punishment for leading his followers into danger and leaving them for dead. Since the adults are slow to reach a decision, Littlefoot, Petrie, Cera, and Spike take it upon themselves to search for Ducky.

Meanwhile, Ducky escapes the Flyers and falls into a cave while fleeing. After the children find her, Ducky comforts Petrie, who is distraught about his uncle's actions, by stating she could tell that Pterano is the least wicked of the three Flyers and has potential to do good. Rinkus and Sierra suddenly re-capture Ducky and pursue the children in violation of Pterano's orders, but the children outsmart them. As the Flyers fly away, Petrie tells them not to go and a thunderstorm comes. Later, the adult dinosaurs meet and Grandpa Longneck tells Petrie's mother to find another flier to help her find the children. Meanwhile, Sierra displays mutinous feelings towards Pterano, but Rinkus convinces him to hold off betraying him until they find the Stone.

The children pursue the Flyers, hoping to reach the Stone before them. The Rainbow Faces help them get there, where they discover the Stone is just an ordinary meteorite. Lamenting over this realization, Pterano explains that he meant to create a paradise with the stone's power, not realizing that this paradise already exists in the form of the Great Valley. Unwilling to believe the Stone is not magic, Rinkus and Sierra betray Pterano. However, as they hit the Stone to make it give them power, the volcano begins to erupt.

Petrie's mother arrives to evacuate the children, and they land back at the site where they camped earlier. Pterano is thanked for saving Ducky's life and his exile is reduced to five years. Petrie cuts in and tries to appeal against the punishment, pleading with the grown-ups to let Pterano stay in the Great Valley. However, Petrie's mother states that even though Pterano may be remorseful, it does not change his previous actions and he must still be held accountable. Pterano, agreeing with the verdict, tells Petrie that everyone has to take accountability for their actions and assures Petrie that he should be fine. Accepting the verdict, Petrie tearfully bids Pterano farewell.

That night, Littlefoot finds the Rainbow Faces, who tell him that the stone was not magic, but his search for it was what really mattered, and reiterate that there are many unknowns to be discovered. They then disappear in a beam of light just as an object similar to the meteorite soars overhead, implying that they're aliens and the meteorite is their spacecraft. As his friends find him, Littlefoot reflects that there are many unknowns and that such unknowns make life wonderful. And Petrie admits that although he still loves and idolizes him, his Uncle Pterano isn't as smart as he thought after all.

== Voice cast ==
- Jeff Bennett as Petrie / Spokes Dinosaur
- Michael York as Pterano
- Thomas Dekker as Littlefoot
- Anndi McAfee as Cera
- Aria Curzon as Ducky
- Rob Paulsen as Rinkus/ Spike
- Jim Cummings as Sierra
- Kenneth Mars as Grandpa Longneck
- Miriam Flynn as Grandma Longneck
- John Ingle as Topsy
- Tress MacNeille as Ducky's Mom / Petrie's Mom
- Charles Kimbrough as Rainbow Face #1
- Patti Deutsch as Rainbow Face #2 (speaking voice)
- B.J. Ward as Rainbow Face #2 (singing voice)

== Production ==
Production of the film had concluded by June 2000. This is the first film in the series to use digital ink-and-paint rather than traditional cel animation that was used in the first 6 films.

== Songs ==
All tracks are written by Michele Brourman and Amanda McBroom.

No.	Title	Performer(s)	Length
1.	"Beyond the Mysterious Beyond"	Thomas Dekker, Anndi McAfee, Charles Kimbrough & B. J. Ward
2.	"Good Inside"	Thomas Dekker, Anndi McAfee, Aria Curzon & Jeff Bennett
3.	"Very Important Creature"	Michael York, Jim Cummings & Rob Paulsen
4.	"Beyond The Mysterious Beyond (Reprise)"	Charles Kimbrough & B. J. Ward
5.	"If We Hold on Together"

== Release ==
- December 5, 2000 (VHS and DVD)
- December 4, 2001 (VHS and DVD)
- December 2, 2003 (VHS and DVD - 4 Movie Dino Pack (Volume 2) and 9 Movie Dino Pack)
- November 29, 2005 (DVD - 2 Mysteries Beyond the Great Valley)

== Reception ==
Entertainment Weekly gave the film a "B" and wrote that it "beats the heck out of Barney's infantile dinosaur tales", with its "velociraptor-fast pace and a minimum of treacle". In August 2014, the New York Post ranked each of the 13 Land Before Time films released up to that point and placed The Stone of Cold Fire at number 10, writing: "Though not quite as annoying as 'Tinysauruses', the name 'Rainbow Faces' comes pretty close".

=== Accolades ===
The film received nominations for "Best Animated Video Premier" and "Best Animated Character Performance" for Littlefoot and Pterano at the Video Premiere Awards in 2001, losing to Joseph: King of Dreams and Batman Beyond: Return of the Joker, respectively. Aria Curzon received an award for "Outstanding Young Voice-Over" at the 23rd Young Artist Awards in 2002 for her role as Ducky in this film, as well as V, VI, and VIII.

Award	Date	Nomination	Nominee	Result
Video Premiere Award	2001	Best Animated Character Performance	Thomas Dekker (voice, Littlefoot), Zeon Davush (supervising animator, Littlefoot)	Nominated
Video Premiere Award	2001	Best Animated Character Performance	Michael York (voice, Pterano), Zeon Davush (supervising animator, Pterano)	Nominated
Video Premiere Award	2001	Best Animated Video Premier	Charles Grosvenor (producer)	Nominated
Young Artist Award	April 7, 2002	Outstanding Young Voice-Over	Aria Curzon (Ducky) (1997-2001)	Won

== See also ==
- List of films featuring dinosaurs
