= The Land Before Time XIII: The Wisdom of Friends =

- DVD cover
- Directed by: Jamie Mitchell
- Written by: John Loy
- Based on: Characters by Judy Freudberg; Tony Geiss
- Produced by: Charles Grosvenor
- Starring: Cuba Gooding Jr. Sandra Oh
- Music by: Michael Tavera; Michele Brourman; Amanda McBroom
- Production company: Universal Animation Studios
- Distributed by: Universal Studios Home Entertainment
- Release date: November 27, 2007
- Running time: 76 minutes
- Country: United States
- Language: English

The Land Before Time XIII: The Wisdom of Friends is a 2007 direct-to-video animated film and the thirteenth film in The Land Before Time series. The film was released by Universal Studios Home Entertainment on November 27, 2007.

== Plot ==
Littlefoot has been having nightmares of Grandma Longneck falling to her death, which almost occurred during an earthquake, but Grandma Longneck luckily saved herself before she fell. Grandma Longneck comforts and teaches Littlefoot important life lessons called "Wisdoms". Later on, Littlefoot, Cera, Ducky, Spike, and Petrie meet three yellow-bellied dinosaurs, Loofah, Doofah, and Foobie. They have lost their way while traveling to distant Berry Valley. Loofah, Doofah, and Foobie seem to be too unintelligent to find their way back, so Littlefoot and the others decide to help their new friends whilst sharing Wisdoms along the way.

During the trip, Littlefoot and his friends have been pursued by a quartet of Sharpteeth, led by one with a scar that goes around his head. They made it to a Watering Hole and meet other yellow bellies. Earlier, Loofah mentioned a so-called "wise one" among the Yellow Bellies but Littlefoot cannot find no sign of him. Littlefoot begins to lead the Yellow Bellies across the Mysterious Beyond to reach the Berry Valley, but Littlefoot has never been to Berry Valley and worries that he might make unwise decisions while he came to teach the Yellow Bellies how to be wise. His friends reassure him that he should trust in his feelings to let him know what to listen to.

As an intense storm occurs, Littlefoot leads the Yellow Bellies onto a plateau for shelter, but Doofah becomes separated from the group, going the wrong direction. Once the storm ends, Littlefoot and his friends were able to find her and she rejoins the group. The Sharpteeth attack again, but they were able to defeat them when the Yellow Bellies bounced up and down. After the Sharpteeth were defeated, they finally made it to Berry Valley. Foobie is revealed to be the "Wise One" all along. Littlefoot and his friends reunite with their family and they return to the Great Valley.

== Voice cast ==
- John Ingle as Narrator/Topsy
- Cody Arens/Logan Arens as Littlefoot
- Anthony Skillman as Littlefoot (singing)
- Anndi McAfee as Cera
- Aria Curzon as Ducky
- Jeff Bennett as Petrie
- Rob Paulsen as Spike/Beipiaosaurus #4
- Cuba Gooding Jr. as Loofah
- Sandra Oh as Doofah
- Jessica Gee as Tria
- Miriam Flynn as Grandma Longneck
- Pete Sepenuk as Foobie

== Music ==
The music was composed by Michael Tavera and the new songs were written by Michele Brourman and Amanda McBroom.

This was the third film in the series without James Horner's original score from the first film; the first two were The Great Longneck Migration and The Great Day of the Flyers, although Michael Tavera's older themes from previous sequels can still be heard.

== Production ==
The film was revealed on the official Land Before Time website seen in a trailer. Almost every sequel is highlighted by a celebrity guest voice; in the case of this film, they are Academy Award winner Cuba Gooding Jr. of Jerry Maguire and Golden Globe winner Sandra Oh of Grey's Anatomy.

The same production team remains, although this marks the debut of Jamie Mitchell, who replaces Charles Grosvenor as director. Therefore, Grosvenor is credited as a supervising director.

== Release date ==
The film was released on DVD on November 27, 2007, with the TV series's episode, "The Hidden Canyon", included as a bonus feature.

== Reception ==
The Wisdom of Friends received a nomination for "Best Feature Film, Ages 5-8" at the 2008 Kids First! Film Festival, losing to Barbie & the Diamond Castle.

Award	Date	Nomination	Nominee	Result
Kids First! Best Award	October 4, 2008	Best Feature Film, Ages 5–8	The Land Before Time XIII	Nominated

== See also ==
- List of films featuring dinosaurs
