= The Land Before Time XIV: Journey of the Brave =

- DVD cover
- Directed by: Davis Doi
- Screenplay by: Cliff Ruby; Elana Lesser
- Based on: Characters created by Judy Freudberg; Tony Geiss
- Produced by: Lisa Melbye; Deidre Brenner
- Starring: Reba McEntire; Damon Wayans Jr.
- Narrated by: Tony Amendola
- Edited by: Luke Guidici
- Music by: Michael Tavera
- Production companies: Universal Animation Studios; Universal 1440 Entertainment
- Distributed by: Universal Pictures Home Entertainment
- Release date: February 2, 2016
- Running time: 82 minutes
- Country: United States
- Language: English

The Land Before Time XIV: Journey of the Brave is a 2016 American direct-to-video animated feature film and the fourteenth and final installment in The Land Before Time franchise. Its nearly 9-year gap from 2007's The Wisdom of Friends marked the longest between two films in the series. The film was directed by Davis Doi and written by Cliff Ruby and Elana Lesser. It was made available on DVD and Digital HD by Universal Pictures Home Entertainment on February 2, 2016, with the DVD version exclusive to Walmart stores in North America until May 10, when it became available in other stores. The film features the voices of Reba McEntire, who performs the song "Look for the Light", and Damon Wayans Jr.

== Plot ==
Littlefoot is awaiting the arrival of his father, Bron, who visits the Great Valley with his herd once a year. However, he learns from a member of his father’s herd, a Nothronychus named Wild Arms that his father became stranded at the fire mountain, leaving the rest of the herd to go on without him. He asks Wild Arms for help, but Wild Arms belligerently says no. After worrying about his father, Littlefoot sets out alone. However, the others soon catch up with him. They do fine at first, but run into the earth divide. It is suggested that they follow the Long Valley, but Littlefoot says that will take too long, and that they must cross the earth divide. Luckily, they are able to knock down a tree, and get across.

After two close encounters with Yutyrannus, night falls and the children go to sleep. Meanwhile, the adults learn about their children's trek, and decide to go after them with two younger ones - Chomper and Ruby. They attempt to have Wild Arms guide them back to where Bron was last seen, but he faints at the mere sight of Chomper, a sharptooth, and has to be carried, leaving Chomper to lead the way with his nose. The next morning, a disagreement between Littlefoot and Cera on which path to take causes Littlefoot to decide to go ahead alone. A sand cloud occurs, and Littlefoot is trapped in a cave, where he meets a Pteranodon named Etta, who knows his father. Meanwhile, Cera, Ducky, and Spike lose Petrie, who comes across a tribe of diggers. They soon find him, and they leave the diggers, who elect themselves another leader.

Etta tells Littlefoot what happened to Bron, and that he may well be dead. She also says that it was because Bron had to rescue Wild Arms that he got into that mess. After many failed attempts to dig their way out of the cave, they head deeper into the cave itself, she sings a song to lead him on his way. The rest of the kids run into a Carnotaurus, though Etta is able to hit a hole through the cave ceiling and help them get away where they reunite with Littlefoot who makes up with Cera. Etta leads Littlefoot and his friends out of the cave, and to the fire mountain where they finally find Bron. It looks hopeless as he is surrounded by flowing fire and one of his legs is stuck under boulders. Bron tells them to go so they do not get hurt, but Littlefoot refuses.

Later, the adults, plus Chomper and Ruby, come across the Carnotaurus. Chomper smells it and they are able to hide from it, but are nearly discovered due to Wild Arms cowering in fear and making noise. Just before the Carnotaurus discovers them, it is distracted by Archaeornithomimus. Etta and the kids spring into action to save Bron. They are able to stop the Flowing Fire by sending water onto it, and use a tree to free Bron, though the flowing fire returns and Littlefoot and his father are trapped. Bron scoops him up, however, and jumps across the lava, and right after, the adults, Chomper, and Ruby, find them. Reunited with his father and the rest of the herd led by Chomper back home to the Valley, the group extol the virtues of working together, and finding bravery through companionship.

== Voice cast ==
- Felix Avitia as Littlefoot
- Anndi McAfee as Cera and Petrie's Mother (replacing Tress MacNeille) and diggers
- Aria Curzon as Ducky and diggers
- Jeff Bennett as Petrie and diggers
- Rob Paulsen as Spike and Skinny Digger
- Damon Wayans Jr. as Wild Arms
- Reba McEntire as Etta
- Barry Bostwick as Grandpa Longneck (replacing Kenneth Mars)
- Miriam Flynn as Grandma Longneck
- George Ball as Mr. Topps (replacing John Ingle)
- Issac Brown as Chomper
- Meghan Strange as Ruby and Ducky and Spike's Mother (replacing Tress MacNeille)
- Scott Whyte as Bron
- Tony Amendola as the Narrator (replacing John Ingle)

== Production ==
News of a new Land Before Time film was first revealed in a November 2014 Yahoo! Finance article detailing Universal Studios' future film plans, though no further information was given. An interview from January 2015 with child actor Felix Avitia revealed that he had been cast as Littlefoot in the tentatively-titled The Land Before Time XIV: Journey of the Heart, which was planned for release later that year. The following July, the first trailer for the film was released on Rotten Tomatoes, revealing the film's finalized title Journey of the Brave, along with a new release date on DVD and Digital HD on February 2, 2016. The North American DVD version was available exclusively at Walmart and Walmart.com, and was preceded by a Land Before Time compilation album featuring songs from the series on January 29 the same year by Back Lot Music.

Journey of the Brave was directed by series newcomer Davis Doi and written by fellow series newcomers Cliff Ruby and Elana Lesser, with music by Land Before Time series veteran Michael Tavera. It features four sing-along songs, including "Look for the Light" performed by country singer Reba McEntire, who also provides the voice for the Pteranodon character Etta. McEntire finished recording her dialogue in August 2015, and later remarked on how the cast of characters "remind me a lot of my friends when I was a kid". Actor Damon Wayans, Jr. was also cast as the character Wild Arms.

== Reception ==
In its first week of release the film debuted at No. 11 on the top 20 Home Video titles. Common Sense Media rated the film 3 out of 5 stars:

There's a gentle sweetness to this story which, when accompanied by four original upbeat songs, softens the danger and suspense that occur in the action sequences. Yes, the dinos do run into some fierce Sharpteeth creatures who chase them, and they do have mountains to climb and a sandstorm to outrun, and they find themselves on the brink of disaster several times, but for kids who are clear about the difference between make-believe and real, there is nothing truly scary or unsettling. The characters are original, quirky, and funny and have been well established in the earlier DVDs so that audiences, both old and new, will find them engaging. The addition of the voice talent of Reba McEntire, who sings, and Damon Wayans, Jr., who jokes a lot, is another plus. A solid entry in the franchise.

== See also ==
- List of films featuring dinosaurs
