= The Land Before Time VIII: The Big Freeze =

2001 US animated film by Charles Grosvenor

- DVD cover
- Directed by: Charles Grosvenor
- Written by: John Loy
- Based on: Characters by Judy Freudberg; Tony Geiss
- Produced by: Charles Grosvenor
- Starring: John Ingle; Aria Noelle Curzon; Rob Paulsen; Thomas Dekker; Anndi McAfee; Jeff Bennett; Tress MacNeille; Susan Krebs; Jeremy Suarez; Kenneth Mars; Miriam Flynn; Robert Guillaume
- Narrated by: John Ingle
- Edited by: Danik Thomas
- Music by: Michael Tavera; James Horner (music from The Land Before Time); London Symphony Orchestra (uncredited)
- Production company: Universal Cartoon Studios
- Distributed by: Universal Studios Home Video
- Release date: December 4, 2001
- Running time: 76 minutes
- Country: United States
- Language: English

The Land Before Time VIII: The Big Freeze, directed by Charles Grosvenor and written by John Loy, is a 2001 direct-to-video animated adventure musical film and the eighth film in The Land Before Time series.

The Land Before Time VIII: The Big Freeze was produced by Universal Cartoon Studios and released by Universal Studios Home Video on December 4, 2001.

== Plot ==
Ducky's relationship with her brother Spike becomes rambunctious and turbulent when he repeatedly keeps her awake at night with his snoring and after he ate her tree stars (which their mother packed specifically for her on their first day of school). She tells Cera about her feelings, and confides that she does not know how to express them; Cera agrees to teach her. Meanwhile, the children are attending a school in which they are taught by an old Pachyrhinosaurus named Mr. Thicknose, who professes to have been everywhere and seen everything. Littlefoot eagerly questions the topics they cover, to the old dinosaur's irritation. Eventually, Mr. Thicknose complains to Grandpa Longneck about Littlefoot's behavior. Littlefoot's Grandpa, knowing Littlefoot meant no harm, explains to him why he must be more respectful to Mr. Thicknose.

Meanwhile, as Ducky treats Spike coldly, Spike meets and befriends Tippy, a young dinosaur from a migrating Spiketail herd that has recently arrived in the Great Valley. Ducky begins to miss Spike when he spends more and more time with the Spiketail herd. One day, the entire Valley is surprised by an overnight snowfall. While the children together have fun frolicking in the snow, the adults complain that Mr. Thicknose, purportedly the wisest in all of the Valley, did not warn them about this impending weather, and suspect that he does not know as much as he claims.

As time goes on, the dinosaurs begin to suffer from the freezing temperatures (through the Big Freeze) and the lack of food growth. The Spiketail herd leaves, as they consume more food than most species. Tippy's mother asks Ducky and Spike's mother, Mama Swimmer, if she can take Spike along during the cold time; Mama Swimmer decides that Spike should choose between staying in the Valley or leaving with the Spiketails. Spike is unsure, so Ducky angrily tells him to leave, which he agrees to do. Afterwards, however, she regrets her actions, and later sneaks away to follow the herd and ask Spike to come back with her.

When her friends find out, they head off into the Mysterious Beyond to find her, but are interrupted by Mr. Thicknose, who decides to accompany them. After several mishaps, they encounter a sharptooth (Albertosaurus), but the kids defeat it with a giant snowball. In the process, they join up with Ducky, who was being chased by it earlier. Soon, they come across a frozen pool of water that they accidentally break. Underneath the ice is a warm spring, and they notice there is lush food nearby. While they relax in the water and feed, Mr. Thicknose confesses that most of his knowledge comes from secondary sources; he listened to the stories of other travelers when he was a child, and in his adult years, he shared those stories to the children in the Valley.

The sharptooth from earlier attacks them again, but Mr. Thicknose saves the children by pushing a log off the hill, causing the sharptooth to trip onto it and roll off a cliff to its unknown fate. Later, the group tries to contact the Valley's residents but find that a wall of snow has blocked them from entry. Ducky, remembering what Cera taught her, exhorts Cera to get riled at the snow. Cera does so, and her enraged screaming causes a snowfall, enabling the Valley's residents to pass through. Meanwhile, the Spiketail herd is starving until Spike picks up the spring's scent. He leads the Spiketails there and reunites with Ducky. However, he falls into a deep part of the spring, and as he is unable to swim, Mama Swimmer jumps in to save him. When she places him on dry ground again, Tippy's mother says that Spike should stay with his family, rather than her herd. Ducky promises to Spike that she will not get angry at him whenever he snores, ever again.

== Voice cast ==
- Aria Curzon as Ducky
- Rob Paulsen as Spike / Leading Stegosaurus
- Jeremy Suarez as Tippy
- Thomas Dekker as Littlefoot
- Anndi McAfee as Cera
- Jeff Bennett as Petrie / Corythosaurus
- Robert Guillaume as Mr. Thicknose
- Tress MacNeille as Ducky's Mom / Petrie's Mom
- Susan Krebs as Tippy's Mom / Ankylosaurus
- Kenneth Mars as Grandpa Longneck / Lambeosaurus
- Miriam Flynn as Grandma Longneck
- John Ingle as Narrator / Topsy

== Production ==
By June 2000, Universal had begun working on the film.

== Songs ==
All tracks are written by Michele Brourman and Amanda McBroom.

No.	Title	Performer(s)	Length
1.	"The Mad Song"	Anndi McAfee & Aria Curzon
2.	"Family"	Aria Curzon, Tress MacNeille, Thomas Dekker, Anndi McAfee & Jeff Bennett
3.	"The Lesson"	Robert Guillaume, Thomas Dekker, Anndi McAfee, Aria Curzon & Jeff Bennett
4.	"If We Hold on Together"

== Release ==
- December 4, 2001 (VHS and DVD)
- December 2, 2003 (VHS and DVD - 4 Movie Dino Pack (Volume 2) and 9 Movie Dino Pack)
- February 7, 2006 (DVD - 2 Dino-Riffic Adventures)
- August 5, 2008 (Carrying Case DVD with Fun Activity Book - 2 Dino-Riffic Adventures - Universal Watch on the Go)

== Reception ==
The film received nominations for "Best Animated Character Performance" for Robert Guillaume as Mr. Thicknose and "Best Animated Video Premier" at the Video Premiere Awards in 2001, losing to Lady and the Tramp II: Scamp's Adventure and Barbie in the Nutcracker, respectively. The Big Freeze was also nominated for Best Sound Editing at the 49th Gold Reel Awards in 2002, beaten by Ruby's Bucket of Blood. Aria Curzon received an award for "Outstanding Young Voice-Over" at the 23rd Young Artist Awards in 2002 for her role as Ducky in this film, as well as V, VI, and VII. When the film was released on home video, it sold 2.5 million copies exceeding the previous entry's sales by 20%, and bringing the total lifetime sales of the entire series to 50 million at that point.

Award	Date	Nomination	Nominee	Result
Gold Reel Award	March 23, 2002	Best Sound Editing in Television - Music, Movies and Specials	Gregory Cathcart (music editor)	Nominated
Video Premiere Award	October 23, 2001	Best Animated Character Performance	Robert Guillaume (voice, Mr. Thicknose), Zeon Davush (supervising animator, Mr. Thicknose)	Nominated
Video Premiere Award	October 23, 2001	Best Animated Video Premier	Charles Grosvenor (producer)	Nominated
Young Artist Award	April 7, 2002	Outstanding Young Voice-Over	Aria Curzon (Ducky) (1997-2001)	Won

== See also ==
- List of films featuring dinosaurs
