= The Land Before Time V: The Mysterious Island =

- Original VHS cover
- Directed by: Charles Grosvenor
- Written by: John Loy
- Based on: Characters by Judy Freudberg; Tony Geiss
- Produced by: Charles Grosvenor
- Starring: John Ingle; Brandon La Croix; Aria Noelle Curzon; Rob Paulsen; Anndi McAfee; Jeff Glenn Bennett; Kenneth Mars; Miriam Flynn; Tress MacNeille; Cannon Young; Christina Pickles
- Narrated by: John Ingle
- Edited by: Jay Bixsen
- Music by: Michael Tavera; James Horner (music from The Land Before Time); London Symphony Orchestra (uncredited)
- Production company: Universal Cartoon Studios
- Distributed by: Universal Studios Home Video
- Release date: December 9, 1997
- Running time: 74 minutes
- Country: United States
- Language: English

The Land Before Time V: The Mysterious Island is a 1997 direct-to-video animated adventure musical film produced and directed by Charles Grosvenor. This is the first film in the series to be directed by Grosvenor, as well as the first film in which Anndi McAfee voices Cera (replacing Candace Hutson, the final remaining cast member from the first installment), Aria Noelle Curzon voices Ducky, and Miriam Flynn voices Grandma Longneck. It is also the only film in which Brandon LaCroix plays Littlefoot; it is the first in which Thomas Dekker provides the singing voice for Littlefoot. Three songs for the film were written by Michele Brourman and Amanda McBroom, with music composed by Michael Tavera and the London Symphony Orchestra. The Land Before Time V: The Mysterious Island was produced by Universal Cartoon Studios and released by Universal Studios Home Video on December 9, 1997.

== Plot ==
One day, "leaf-gobblers" descend upon the Great Valley, devouring all plants and reducing it to a barren wasteland. The Great Valley's inhabitants must find another place where they can survive until the plants have grown back. However, the leaf-gobblers have left a path of devastation behind them, leaving no food for anyone to find. After searching for days, tension enters the group as Cera's father and Littlefoot's grandfather argue over changing their course, beginning a fight between Littlefoot and Cera. The fight breaks up when Cera's father announces that every herd should go its own way the next morning. Not wanting to be separated, Littlefoot leads his friends off in the night, in the hope they can find food before they are caught. They leave a trail for the grownups to follow, and reach the "Big Water". Disheartened by the undrinkable water, the children spy a verdant island connected to the mainland by a land bridge. En route, an earthshake occurs, which creates a tsunami from which they escape. They tuck in to the plentiful bounty of the island, but are then horrified to discover the tsunami has destroyed the land bridge.

Isolated on the island, they try out Cera's idea to return by using a log as a boat. The plan works well, despite Cera suffering seasickness and Petrie being too terrified of the Big Water to act as lookout. However, a "swimming sharptooth" attacks, and in the confusion and fright which follows, they end up on the island again. That night, they remember their families, while the herd, having followed the trail, sleep on the shores of the beach on the mainland, worrying for them while Cera's father blames their leave on Littlefoot.

The next morning, the children wake up to the shadow of a Sharptooth, only to find that it is Chomper, the young Sharptooth who previously hatched in their care before returning to his parents. (Note: This happened in the second film.) Since then, Chomper has learned how to speak. Chomper takes them to a safe refuge to hide from his parents. Unaware of Chomper and the others, a Giganotosaurus has been living on the island and begins hunting down the children. Afterwards, Ducky is captured by a Pterodactylus, but escapes before coming to any harm. Chomper hides the children in odorous plants, (Note: implied to be garlic.) and provides them with leafy food upon their request. However, Cera displays distrust to Chomper, leaving him heartbroken as he departs in tears. Littlefoot follows him and apologizes, but is interrupted by Chomper's mother. She nuzzles him, then leaves. Littlefoot is intrigued by her display of love for Chomper.

As Littlefoot went back to the hideout, the Giganotosaurus finds and chases the children towards a cliff above the big water. Chomper tries to help, but is overcome by the Sharptooth. His parents come to the rescue on Chomper (and the same thing for the kids) and battle the Sharptooth near the edge of the island, during which he falls into the Big Water and takes Chomper with him, much to his parents' shock. Littlefoot plunges in to save Chomper while the Sharptooth is swept away by the ocean current. Another swimming Sharptooth appears, but this time, they discovered Elsie, an Elasmosaurus who saves them both from drowning. She returns them to the island, where Chomper's grateful parents promise never to eat the children; Chomper's father promises the same while admitting that, after sniffing Spike (who had eaten some of the foul-smelling hideout), anything that smelt that bad would not taste good anyway. Chomper's mother also nuzzles Littlefoot, in gratitude for his actions to save Chomper from drowning. Cera realizes her mistake and accepts that not all Sharpteeth are so bad as she thought. Elsie offers to take them across the sea, so Chomper and his parents bid them farewell, promising that they will see each other again. When they get back on the mainland, they find that the herd found a lush, green, sanctuary on the shore where they can stay. When the Great Valley becomes fertile again, the herd returns home.

== Voice cast ==
- Brandon LaCroix as Littlefoot (speaking voice)
  - Thomas Dekker as Littlefoot (singing voice)
- Cannon Young as Chomper
- Anndi McAfee as Cera
- Aria Curzon as Ducky
- Jeff Bennett as Petrie / Mr. Clubtail
- Rob Paulsen as Spike
- Kenneth Mars as Grandpa Longneck
- Miriam Flynn as Grandma Longneck
- Christina Pickles as Elsie
- John Ingle as Narrator / Topsy
- Tress MacNeille as Ducky's mother / Petrie's mother

== Songs ==
All tracks are written by Michele Brourman and Amanda McBroom.

No.	Title	Performer(s)	Length
1.	"Big Water"	Thomas Dekker, Anndi McAfee, Aria Curzon & Jeff Bennett
2.	"Always There"	Thomas Dekker, Anndi McAfee, Aria Curzon & Jeff Bennett
3.	"Friends For Dinner"	Thomas Dekker, Anndi McAfee, Aria Curzon, Jeff Bennett & Cannon Young
4.	"If We Hold on Together"

== Release ==
- December 9, 1997 (VHS and laserdisc)
- December 9, 1998 (VHS and laserdisc, the last laserdisc release - Universal Family Features)
- December 4, 2001 (VHS)
- April 1, 2003 (DVD)
- December 5, 2003 (VHS and DVD - 4 Movie Dino Pack (Volume 2) and 9 Movie Dino Pack)
- February 8, 2005 (DVD - 2 Great Movies Featuring Chomper)

== Reception ==
Denise Lanctot of Entertainment Weekly gave the film an "A" and praised the "first-class orchestral score" and its "tail-thumping" songs. Aria Curzon received an award for "Outstanding Young Voice-Over" at the 23rd Young Artist Awards in 2002 for her role as Ducky in this film, as well as VI, VII, and VIII.

Award	Date	Nomination	Nominee	Result
Young Artist Award	April 7, 2002	Outstanding Young Voice-Over	Aria Curzon (Ducky) (1997-2001)	Won

== See also ==
- List of films featuring dinosaurs
