= The Land Before Time XII: The Great Day of the Flyers =

- DVD cover
- Directed by: Charles Grosvenor
- Written by: John Loy
- Based on: Characters by Judy Freudberg; Tony Geiss
- Produced by: Charles Grosvenor
- Starring: John Ingle; Nick Price; Aria Noelle Curzon; Rob Paulsen; Camryn Manheim; Anndi McAfee; Jeff Bennett; Nika Futterman; Susan Blu; Tress MacNeille; Kenneth Mars
- Edited by: Jay Bixsen
- Music by: Michael Tavera
- Production companies: Universal Animation Studios; Wang Film Productions
- Distributed by: Universal Studios Home Entertainment
- Release dates: December 6, 2006 (TV); February 27, 2007 (DVD)
- Running time: 81 minutes
- Country: United States
- Language: English

The Land Before Time XII: The Great Day of the Flyers is a 2006 animated musical direct-to-video film, and is the twelfth film in the Land Before Time series. It was released on TV on December 6, 2006, and then on DVD on February 27, 2007, by Universal Studios Home Entertainment. This was the final film role of Kenneth Mars before his retirement and death in 2008 and 2011 respectively.

== Plot ==
Petrie is having a difficult time preparing for the Day of the Flyers, when all of the young flyers must participate in a precise flying exhibition to prove that they are ready to fly with the adults. Always a nervous flyer, Petrie has even more trouble flying with his siblings in precise group formations. At the same time, a strange newcomer to the Great Valley has Littlefoot and his friends trying to help figure out just exactly what he is. Named Guido, a Microraptor, he is a strange looking creature. Cera is having her own troubles, as her grumpy father and his new mate, Tria, get ready to welcome a hatchling to the family. The hatchling's name is Tricia and Cera begins to slowly bond with her new sister.

All of these issues come together on the night before the Day of the Flyers, when Guido starts to figure out what he is. Guido begins sleep walking and Petrie and his friends follow him, inadvertently leading all of the gang on a perilous adventure into the Mysterious Beyond. In the Mysterious Beyond, Guido wakes up from sleep walking and accidentally wakes up a Spinosaurus which gives chase and tried to eat them. But Petrie, Guido, and the others defeat the Spinosaurus by trapping and wedging it between two rocks and they returned to the Great Valley.

As the Day of the Flyers arrives, Petrie and his siblings begin to participate. Following Guido's advice to be himself, Petrie's performs his own unique flying and inspires the other flyers to do the same. While watching and following the flyers, Tricia falls into a river and was carrying her straight to the waterfall. Guido, Petrie, and Petrie's siblings rescue her just in time but they accidentally drop her and Cera saves her before she lands in the river again. Tricia then says her first words, which is "Cera". The film ends with Cera and her family loving on Tricia while the other Dinosaurs watch in awe.

== Voice cast ==
- Jeff Bennett as Petrie / Petrie's Sibling #2
- Rob Paulsen as Guido / Spike / Kosh
- Nick Price as Littlefoot
- Anndi McAfee as Cera
- Aria Curzon as Ducky
- Tress MacNeille as Petrie's Mother
- John Ingle as Topsy / Narrator
- Camryn Manheim as Tria
- Kenneth Mars as Grandpa Longneck / Parasaurolophus
- Nika Futterman as Petrie's Sibling #1 / Tricia
- Susan Blu as Petrie's Sibling #3

== Production ==
The project was announced in August 2005, along with The Land Before Time TV series, both set to debut in 2007. It was the first sequel in the series to be filmed in widescreen and the first to be filmed in the high-definition format, although the Region 1 DVD was in full screen (cropping the left and right of the image), though not pan and scan as the camera stays directly in the center of the image. However, the previous film The Land Before Time X: The Great Longneck Migration was matted to anamorphic widescreen on DVD in Israel. To help promote the film, the music video for the film's song Flip, Flap and Fly was shown during early theatrical screenings of Curious George and later screenings of The Chronicles of Narnia: The Lion, the Witch and the Wardrobe and was then released as part of the opening previews on the DVD release of that film and PollyWorld with the music video two times.

The Universal Studios website notes this film as a "tween film".

The same production team remains, with Charles Grosvenor as director and producer. It was produced by Universal Animation Studios and distributed by Universal Studios Home Entertainment.

This was the second film in the series to contain slow-motion; as Littlefoot jumps off the falling tree, he is very slow until he lands on the cliff.

Animation was provided by Wang Film and Cuckoo's Nest studios in Taiwan.

== Release ==
The film was released on DVD in the United States and Canada on February 27, 2007. Bonus features included a read-along, two sing-alongs, and two interactive games. On the same day, the film was also given a Walmart exclusive DVD 2-pack with a bonus DVD containing two episodes of The Land Before Time TV series to promote the Cartoon Network airing of the TV series in the United States.

== Music ==
The music score was composed by Michael Tavera and Kyle Kenneth Batter with additional music composed by Billy Martin. This was the second film in the series without James Horner's original score from the first film (the first was The Land Before Time X: The Great Longneck Migration), although Michael Tavera's older themes from the previous sequels can still be heard in this film.

All tracks are written by Michele Brourman and Amanda McBroom.

No.	Title	Performer(s)	Length
1.	"One of a Kind"	Nick Price, Anndi McAfee, Aria Curzon, Jeff Bennett & Rob Paulsen
2.	"Things Change"	Nick Price, Anndi McAfee & Aria Curzon
3.	"Flip, Flap and Fly"	Jeff Bennett, Rob Paulsen & Cast

== See also ==
- List of animated feature-length films
- List of films featuring dinosaurs
