= The Land Before Time X: The Great Longneck Migration =

- DVD cover
- Directed by: Charles Grosvenor
- Written by: John Loy
- Based on: Characters by Judy Freudberg; Tony Geiss
- Produced by: Charles Grosvenor
- Starring: John Ingle; Alec Medlock; Kenneth Mars; Miriam Flynn; Aria Noelle Curzon; Jeff Bennett; Rob Paulsen; Anndi McAfee; Brandon Michael DePaul; James Garner; Bernadette Peters; Kiefer Sutherland
- Edited by: Jay Bixsen
- Music by: Michael Tavera
- Production company: Universal Cartoon Studios
- Distributed by: Universal Studios Home Video
- Release date: December 2, 2003
- Running time: 85 minutes
- Country: United States
- Language: English

The Land Before Time X: The Great Longneck Migration (aka The Great Migration) is a 2003 direct-to-video animated adventure musical drama film and the tenth film in The Land Before Time series.

The film was produced by Universal Cartoon Studios and released by Universal Studios Home Video on December 2, 2003.

== Plot ==
Littlefoot has an ominous "sleep story" (dream) where he sees the "Great Circle" (the sun) falling out of the sky, and when he mentions it to his grandparents, they reveal they are sharing the same experience, with his grandpa lamenting that they need to go somewhere. Littlefoot explains his situation to his friends and they become interested. Led only by their instinct, they leave the next day. Out of curiosity, Cera, Spike, Ducky, and Petrie follow them. During their trek, Littlefoot is nearly eaten by a Sarcosuchus while playing in a swamp, but a Supersaurus named Sue saves his life by stepping on the predator and joins him and his grandparents, as she is driven on by the same sense as them. They are soon joined by dozens of other Longnecks feeling the same instincts. Meanwhile, Littlefoot's friends are attacked by the Sarcosuchus in the same swamp that Littlefoot and his grandparents passed through, but they manage to escape. That night, they sleep next to a large boulder, which the next morning, turns out to be a sleeping gray Tyrannosaurus, which wakes up and chases them. They escape into a small cave and meet Pat, an elderly Apatosaurus.

Littlefoot, his grandparents, and Sue reach a large crater where hundreds of Longnecks have gathered. There, he meets his long-lost biological father, Bron, for the first time. Bron tells Littlefoot how he was separated from Littlefoot's mother during the great “earthshake” in the first film. During his wanderings in search of Littlefoot, Bron became the leader of a herd of longnecks and the guardian to a young, mischievous Brachiosaurus, Shorty, who becomes jealous of Littlefoot taking all of his father's attention. Meanwhile, Pat tells Littlefoot's friends that the Longnecks are being driven by a tradition involving a solar eclipse, which was taken as a sign that the sun will be sent crashing down into the Earth by the "Night Circle" (the moon), which is said to have been jealous of the sun's brightness. Every solar eclipse, Longnecks from all around the world gather in one location to stretch their necks up and "catch" the sun, so they can propel it back up into the sky. Soon after, Pat steps into a pool of lava, which scalds his foot badly, but he is still able to move as they escape the lava field.

On the day of the eclipse, Littlefoot wakes up to see Shorty traveling over the crater walls and running away, out of spite for being ignored by Bron. He catches up to Shorty and convinces him to stay; they reconcile and agree to see themselves as brothers. Moments later, Littlefoot's friends appear, with a brown Tyrannosaurus pursuing them. Pat defends the children, but is slowed down by his burnt foot. Bron rushes to their aid and is able to temporarily knock out the Sharptooth. Then, a green Tyrannosaurus and the same gray Sharptooth from earlier arrive. Littlefoot's grandparents join in the fight and defeat the green Sharptooth. Bron fights the brown Sharptooth again while Pat fights the gray one. As soon as all three Sharpteeth are defeated, the eclipse begins, and the sudden darkness forces the Sharpteeth to retreat towards the end.

Littlefoot, his grandparents, Bron, Shorty, Sue, and Pat take their place among the other Longnecks, who have all gathered on top of the crater walls. They succeed in "catching" the sun, and everyone rejoices as the eclipse ends. With their mission completed, the different Longneck herds depart on their separate ways. Sue departs with an Ultrasaurus. Littlefoot's friends ask Pat to come live with them in the Great Valley, which he accepts. Littlefoot is initially hesitant in leaving Bron, as he is the leader of a migratory herd, but he eventually realizes that he belongs in the Great Valley. Accepting this, Bron leaves with Shorty and his herd, promising to keep in touch with Littlefoot and visit him. Littlefoot returns to the Valley with his friends, grandparents, and Pat.

== Voice cast ==
- Alec Medlock as Littlefoot
- Kiefer Sutherland as Bron
- Kenneth Mars as Grandpa Longneck
- Miriam Flynn as Grandma Longneck
- Anndi McAfee as Cera
- Aria Curzon as Ducky
- Jeff Bennett as Petrie
- Rob Paulsen as Spike
- James Garner as Pat
- Brandon Michael DePaul as Shorty
- Bernadette Peters as Sue
- John Ingle as Narrator / Topsy

== Production ==
The film is known internationally as "The Great Migration", rather than "The Great Longneck Migration". It was the first film in the series to use fully computer-generated dinosaurs.

=== Aspect ratio ===
Even though this film was presented in full screen on DVD worldwide (since that is what aspect ratio the film was created in), the film is matted to anamorphic widescreen (cropping the top and bottom of the image) on a Hebrew DVD in Israel.

== Marketing ==
The film was the subject of a massive marketing push for Universal. Prior to the release of Journey to Big Water, Universal orchestrated a yearlong 15th anniversary promotion between the release of the 9th and 10th entries including DVD re-releases of previous franchise entries, "Land Before Time" events at Universal theme parks, introducing merchandise like a "Land Before Time" ear thermometer and creating a club named after lead character Littlefoot with newsletters and activities.

== Music ==
The music was scored by Michael Tavera with additional music composed by Stephen Coleman. This was the first film in the series that did not use James Horner's original score.

All tracks are written by Michele Brourman and Amanda McBroom.

No.	Title	Performer(s)	Length
1.	"Adventuring"	Alec Medlock, Anndi McAfee, Aria Curzon & Jeff Bennett
2.	"Me and My Dad"	Alec Medlock
3.	"Bestest Friends (a.k.a. Best of Friends)"	Anndi McAfee, Aria Curzon & Jeff Bennett
4.	"Bestest Friends (Reprise)"	Olivia Newton-John

== Release ==
- December 2, 2003 (VHS and DVD)
- September 19, 2006 (DVD - 2 Tales of Discovery and Friendship)
- August 5, 2008 (Carrying Case DVD with Fun Activity Book - 2 Tales of Discovery and Friendship - Universal Watch on the Go)

== Reception ==
The Great Longneck Migration received nominations for "Best Animated DVD Premiere Movie" and "Best Original Song" at the 2003 DVD Exclusive Awards, losing to 101 Dalmatians II: Patch's London Adventure and Run Ronnie Run!, respectively.

Award	Date	Nomination	Nominee	Result
DVD Exclusive Awards	2003	Best Animated DVD Premiere Movie	Charles Grosvenor (producer)	Nominated
DVD Exclusive Awards	2003	Best Original Song in a DVD Premiere Movie	"Best of Friends" performed by Olivia Newton-John	Nominated

== See also ==
- List of films featuring dinosaurs
- List of films featuring eclipses
