= The Land Before Time III: The Time of the Great Giving =

- Original VHS cover
- Directed by: Roy Allen Smith
- Written by: Dev Ross
- Based on: Characters by Judy Freudberg; Tony Geiss
- Produced by: Roy Allen Smith; Zahra Dowlatabadi
- Starring: Jeff Bennett; Linda Gary; Nicholas Guest; Whitby Hertford; Heather Hogan; Candace Hutson; John Ingle; Kenneth Mars; Tress MacNeille; Scott McAfee; Scott Menville; Rob Paulsen; Frank Welker
- Edited by: Jay Bixsen
- Music by: Michael Tavera; James Horner (themes)
- Production company: Universal Cartoon Studios
- Distributed by: MCA/Universal Home Video
- Release date: December 12, 1995
- Running time: 70 minutes
- Country: United States
- Language: English

The Land Before Time III: The Time of the Great Giving is a 1995 direct-to-video animated adventure musical film directed by Roy Allen Smith. It is the second sequel to The Land Before Time and the third film in the film franchise. The film was produced by Universal Cartoon Studios and released by MCA/Universal Home Video on December 12, 1995.

== Plot ==
Meteorites near the Great Valley cause a drought that threatens the inhabitants' lives. Mr. Threehorn becomes incredibly protective of the remaining water and mean to the inhabitants, forcing Littlefoot and the others to set out to find more water. The group is pursued by a trio of teenage dinosaurs consisting of a Hypsilophodon named Hyp, a Muttaburrasaurus named Mutt, and a Nodosaurus named Nod, who inadvertently cause Mr. Threehorn to think that Littlefoot is a bad influence. When Littlefoot and the others find a small lake, the bullies emerge and claim the waterhole for themselves, demanding that Littlefoot and the others keep silent about their discovery. Littlefoot and the others flee from the bullies, but during the pursuit, Hyp, Mutt and Nod are chased away by a wasp, and the children discover the reason behind the blockage of the water source.

Before they can return and tell the other inhabitants the truth, lightning strikes a tree, igniting a wildfire that spreads throughout the Great Valley. The dinosaurs barely make it to safety at the edge of the Mysterious Beyond. When the children tell the adults of their discovery, disagreements about what to do erupts among the adults. Hyp, Nod, and Mutt set out into the Mysterious Beyond on their own to get to the water first. Anticipating danger that Hyp and his cohorts have gotten into and recognizing commonality with them, Littlefoot and the others follow to help if necessary. It becomes so when Hyp mistakes a tar pit for water and gets stuck in it. After Littlefoot and his friends haul Hyp out, the adults arrive and Hyp is harshly scolded by his father. Realizing that he has been acting no different than Hyp’s father and feeling sorry for Hyp, Mr. Threehorn kindly lectures Hyp's father on how Hyp is a bully from being mistreated. Afterwards, they all decide to work together to find the water.

Before they can take further steps, the herd is attacked by a pack of Velociraptors. The pursuit leads to a dam of boulders created by the meteorites that caused the drought. As the raptors and the adults battle, the children, including Hyp and his cronies, work together to break the dam. They all watch as the freed water washes away the raptors. The water also puts out the fires which are still burning in the valley. Finally, they manage to survive and land on the opposite bank. The herd returns to the Great Valley, but they discover that the fire has destroyed most of their green food. Luckily, the dinosaurs find the spots in the Great Valley where green food still grows. They proportionately move from one verdant area to another and share everything they find. This pattern results in the event being called the Time of the Great Giving.

== Voice cast ==
- Scott McAfee as Littlefoot
- Candace Hutson as Cera
- Heather Hogan as Ducky
- Jeff Bennett as Petrie / Mutt / Iguanodon
- Rob Paulsen as Spike / Kosh
- John Ingle as Narrator / Topsy
- Whit Hertford as Hyp
- Scott Menville as Nod
- Kenneth Mars as Grandpa Longneck
- Linda Gary as Grandma Longneck / Mother Quetzalcoatlus
- Nicholas Guest as Hyp's Father
- Tress MacNeille as Stegosaurus / Spike & Ducky's mother / Petrie's Mother
- Frank Welker as the Velociraptors

== Songs ==
All tracks are written by Michele Brourman and Amanda McBroom.

No.	Title	Performer(s)	Length
1.	"When You're Big"	Whit Hertford, Jeff Bennett & Scott Menville
2.	"Standing Tough"	John Ingle
3.	"Kids Like Us"	Scott McAfee, Candace Hutson, Heather Hogan & Jeff Bennett
4.	"If We Hold on Together"

== Reception ==
In a brief Entertainment Weekly review, Michael Sauter criticized some modernisms in the dialogue but said that "Littlefoot and his friends still retain their youthful charm". In August 2014, the New York Post ranked each of the 13 Land Before Time films released up to that point and placed The Time of the Great Giving at number 2, noting the "genuinely terrifying" velociraptors. The film holds a 60% "Fresh" rating on Rotten Tomatoes, with an average critic score of 5.4 out of 10.

In his 2002 book Welcome to the Desert of the Real, Slovenian Marxist philosopher Slavoj Žižek cited a song from this movie, "When You're Big", as an example of "hegemonic liberal multiculturalist ideology". Quoting the song's lyrics, Žižek wrote: "The same message is repeated again and again: we are all different — some of us are big, some are small; some know how to fight, others know how to flee — but we should learn to live with these differences, to perceive them as something which makes our lives richer". Žižek notes the inconsistency of this vision in the fact that the dinosaurs prey on each other, and have other irreconcilable differences: "The problem, of course, is: how far do we go? It takes all sorts - does that mean nice and brutal, poor and rich, victims and torturers? The reference to the dinosaur kingdom is especially ambiguous here, with its brutal character of animal species devouring each other - is this also one of the things that 'need to be done to make our life fun'? The very inner inconsistency of this vision of the prelapsarian 'land before time' thus bears witness to how the message of collaboration-in-differences is ideology at its purest".

The film won "Best Animated Video Production" at the 24th Annie Awards in 1996, and was nominated for "Best Genre Video Release" at the 22nd Saturn Awards that same year, losing to V: The Final Battle.

Award	Date	Nomination	Nominee	Result
Annie Award	November 10, 1996	Best Animated Video Production	The Land Before Time III	Won
Saturn Award	June 25, 1996	Best Genre Video Release	The Land Before Time III	Nominated

== Home media ==
The original VHS release contained a sneak preview of The Land Before Time IV: Journey Through the Mists (1996) prior to the film, which is a music video for the song "It Takes All Sorts".

- December 12, 1995 (VHS and laserdisc)
- May 13, 1997 (VHS and laserdisc - The Land Before Time Collection)
- December 1, 1998 (VHS and laserdisc, the last laserdisc release - Universal Family Feature)
- December 4, 2001 (VHS)
- December 10, 2002 (DVD)
- December 2, 2003 (VHS and DVD - 4 Movie Dino Pack (Volume 1) and 9 Movie Dino Pack)
- September 27, 2005 (DVD - 2 Dino-Mite Movies)

== See also ==
- List of films featuring dinosaurs
