= The Land Before Time VI: The Secret of Saurus Rock =

- Original VHS cover
- Directed by: Charles Grosvenor
- Written by: Libby Hinson; John Loy
- Produced by: Charles Grosvenor
- Starring: Thomas Dekker; Kenneth Mars; Anndi McAfee; Aria Curzon; Jeff Glen Bennett; Nancy Cartwright; Sandy Fox; Miriam Flynn; John Ingle; Danny Mann; Kris Kristofferson
- Edited by: Jay Bixsen
- Music by: Michael Tavera; James Horner (music from The Land Before Time)
- Production company: Universal Cartoon Studios
- Distributed by: Universal Studios Home Video
- Release date: December 1, 1998
- Running time: 76 minutes
- Country: United States
- Language: English

The Land Before Time VI: The Secret of Saurus Rock is a 1998 direct-to-video animated adventure musical film and the sixth film in The Land Before Time series about four dinosaurs and a pterosaur who live in the Great Valley. It is the first film in which Thomas Dekker is the voice of Littlefoot. This was the second The Land Before Time direct-to-video film to be produced and directed by Charles Grosvenor. It was produced by Universal Cartoon Studios and released by Universal Studios Home Video on December 1, 1998.

== Plot ==
One night, Littlefoot's grandfather tells the children stories about how their universe was created, as well as the "Lone Dinosaur", a legendary Longneck (Diplodocus) who protected the Great Valley from a ferocious Sharptooth (Tyrannosaurus). During the fight, the Sharptooth was killed and the Lone Dinosaur suffered a scar across his right eye. Soon after the battle, a huge dinosaur-like monolith emerged during an earthquake. The dinosaurs called it "Saurus Rock". The legend also states that if anyone damages the monolith, bad luck would descend upon the Valley.

The next day, while the children are playing, Littlefoot accidentally falls off a cliff and is saved by a mysterious Diplodocus named Doc. Littlefoot is intrigued by Doc, who is scarred across one eye and displays prior knowledge of the Great Valley's topography. This causes him to assume Doc is the Lone Dinosaur. He tells his friends this, narrating a legend to support his assumption. Inspired, Cera's infant niece and nephew, Dinah and Dana, go to Saurus Rock unnoticed. The next day, a worried Cera informs Littlefoot that Dinah and Dana are missing, and the group deduces where they are headed.

When Littlefoot and his friends finally reach Saurus Rock, they see Dinah and Dana on the top. As they climb up to rescue them, Dinah and Dana fall off the top, breaking off one of the rock's teeth. As they head home, an Allosaurus chases them. The children cross a gorge via a suspended log, but when the Sharptooth tries to follow them, the log breaks under its weight and it falls to its apparent death. On the way home, they are confronted by Cera's father, who scolds Cera for not properly caring for the twins. As Cera marches herself home, he continues with his talk to her that she still must be watched herself. That night, Littlefoot has a nightmare in which he falls off a tooth on Saurus Rock and the entire monolith collapses. Grandpa Longneck comforts his grandson after he wakes up from the nightmare, but Littlefoot asks him what would happen if Saurus Rock was broken. His Grandpa replies that "bad luck would descend upon the valley".

Over the next few days, incidents of bad luck plague the Valley, starting with the watering hole drying up. Then a tornado hits the valley, causing damage, but Cera saves the twins and Doc also saves Littlefoot. Dinah and Dana tell Cera's father of her courage for saving them, in which he tells his daughter that he is proud of her. Littlefoot's grandfather finds Doc with his grandson. Doc protected Littlefoot from the worst of the storm and his Grandpa thanks him. The adults, however, blame Doc, as the misfortunes apparently occurred after his arrival, while Littlefoot blames himself and his friends, recalling the breaking of Saurus Rock. Eager to exonerate Doc, Littlefoot attempts to take one of the Sharptooth's teeth to replace the broken stone. In the process, he discovers the Allosaurus is still alive. After escaping, Littlefoot is attacked by a Tyrannosaurus, with his Grandpa intervening, having been led there by Littlefoot's friends. Soon, the Allosaurus returns and works together with the Tyrannosaurus to take down Grandpa Longneck. However, Doc comes to the rescue. The sharpteeth charge through and run into the rock spire and fall down. The two long necks work together to pull down the rock tower to crush the carnivores to death. One of the teeth from the Allosaurus falls out, and the children use it to repair Saurus Rock.

Doc departs, remarking that Littlefoot already has a hero on whom to depend, referring to his Grandpa. Littlefoot asks his Grandpa if the bad luck will finally be over. They both agree that while there is no such thing as bad luck, there is also no harm in making sure. Littlefoot and Cera later build a legend of their own based on this new paradigm, portraying Grandpa Longneck as a hero called "The Brave, Great Dinosaur".

== Voice cast ==
- Thomas Dekker as Littlefoot
- Kenneth Mars as Grandpa Longneck
- Kris Kristofferson as Doc
- Anndi McAfee as Cera
- Aria Curzon as Ducky
- Jeff Bennett as Petrie / Spike
- Nancy Cartwright as Dana
- Sandy Fox as Dinah
- Miriam Flynn as Grandma Longneck
- John Ingle as Topsy
- Danny Mann as Allosaurus

== Songs ==
All tracks are written by Michele Brourman and Amanda McBroom.

No.	Title	Performer(s)	Length
1.	"The Legend of the Lone Dinosaur"	Thomas Dekker, Anndi McAfee, Aria Curzon & Jeff Bennett
2.	"Bad Luck"	Thomas Dekker, Anndi McAfee, Aria Curzon & Jeff Bennett
3.	"On Your Own"	Thomas Dekker
4.	"If We Hold on Together"

== Release ==
Universal Studios Home Video released it on home video on December 1, 1998.

== Reception ==
In August 2014, the New York Post ranked each of the 13 Land Before Time films released up to that point and placed The Secret of Saurus Rock at number 11, calling it "boring and uninspired".

Aria Curzon received an award for "Outstanding Young Voice-Over" at the 2002 Young Artist Awards for her role as Ducky in this film, as well as V, VII, and VIII. The film was nominated for "Outstanding Achievement in an Animated Home Video Production" at the 27th Annie Awards in 1999, losing to Disney's The Lion King II: Simba's Pride, as well as "Most Unwelcome Direct-to-Video Release" at the 1999 Stinkers Bad Movie Awards, beaten by "Bill Clinton's Grand Jury Testimony".

Award	Date	Nomination	Nominee	Result
Annie Award	November 6, 1999	Outstanding Achievement in an Animated Home Video Production	The Land Before Time VI	Nominated
Stinkers Bad Movie Awards	1999	Most Unwelcome Direct-to-Video Release	The Land Before Time VI	Nominated
Young Artist Award	April 7, 2002	Outstanding Young Voice-Over	Aria Curzon (Ducky) (1997-2001)	Won

== Cultural references ==
- Beethoven's 3rd shows some scenes from this film.
- "The Lone Dinosaur" is based on The Lone Ranger.
- The American Dad! episode "Who Smarted?" mentions this film, and plays what it purports to be a clip from it at the end, but the clip is not actually from the film.

== See also ==
- List of films featuring dinosaurs
