= List of The Land Before Time characters =

The main characters of The Land Before Time from the television series. From left to right: Spike, Ducky, Cera, Littlefoot, Petrie, Ruby, and Chomper.

This is a list of characters in The Land Before Time, a series of animated feature films and a television series. The main characters include Littlefoot (Apatosaurus), Cera (Triceratops), Ducky (Saurolophus), Petrie (Pteranodon), Spike (Stegosaurus), and in the spin-off television series and the fourteenth film, Chomper (Tyrannosaurus) and Ruby (Oviraptor). Other characters include the families of the main characters, the residents of their home, the Great Valley, and outsiders to the Great Valley.

== Creation and development ==
The idea for The Land Before Time came during production of An American Tail. Steven Spielberg's studio Amblin Entertainment was interested in doing a film about dinosaurs, which were popular at the time, leading Spielberg, director Don Bluth, and producer George Lucas to develop the prehistoric setting and its cast. Inspired by the dinosaur-themed "Rite of Spring" sequence from Disney's Fantasia, Spielberg had originally intended for the movie to have no speech, with music cues and body language telling the story, effectively rendering all the characters mute. However, it was decided that the film could not carry a story without dialogue, and each character was given a speaking language accordingly. The film's artists used the Fantasia sequence and characters as guides when creating their first concept art.

Bluth had to learn most of his information about specific dinosaur species before work began, stating "I had to do lots and lots of research because I never was a fanatic about dinosaurs as a kid. But in many ways it became a fictional fantasy because it's about these young children who are taught to hate each other; anyone who is different from him. When they are separated from their parents, these five little children have to learn to get along with each other for survival. So there is a bit of a moral in it, too". The films creators decided to have a Tyrannosaurus as the main villain.

While Bluth had originally wanted to portray a more "forceful, dramatic" representation of prehistoric times, the idea was sometimes at odds with studio executives who wanted a more child-friendly "get-along gang" approach, which called for the main characters becoming cuter, but still distinctly detailed, as a compromise. After the release of the first film, neither Bluth, Spielberg, nor Lucas had further creative input in the series, with character development and design tweaks now guided by Universal Pictures Home Entertainment and associated studios.

== Main characters ==
=== Littlefoot ===
Littlefoot, voiced by Gabriel Damon (I), Scott McAfee (II-IV), Brandon LaCroix (V), Thomas Dekker (singing voice, V; singing and speaking, VI-IX), Alec Medlock (X), Aaron Spann (XI), Nick Price (XII), Cody Arens (XIII, TV series), Logan Arens (XIII), Anthony Skillman (singing voice, XIII, TV series) and Felix Avitia (XIV), is a brown male Apatosaurus, or "Long Neck". He was born in the beginning of the very first film. When his mother dies protecting him from a sharptooth, he is forced to travel through the harsh wilderness alone to find his surviving grandparents. After meeting several young dinosaurs along the way who would become his best friends, they arrive in the verdant Great Valley where the series primarily takes place. In Journey Through the Mists, Littlefoot is introduced to his female cousin Ali, a member of another Longneck herd. He eventually meets his father, Bron, in the film The Great Longneck Migration. Bron adopts an orphan named Shorty, who becomes his foster brother.

Littlefoot has been called a Brontosaurus, a Brachiosaurus, and also an Apatosaurus.

He was originally named "Thunderfoot" by the creators of the first film, until it was discovered that a Triceratops character from a children's book had the same name. The original name was kept very late into production, up until just before the film's release. Littlefoot has been compared to characters such as Disney's Bambi, and Dorothy from The Wizard of Oz, on how he goes on a strange journey and meets many new friends along the way.

=== Cera ===
Cera, voiced by Candace Hutson (I-IV), and Anndi McAfee (V-XIV, TV series) is an orange female Triceratops or "Three Horn". Like Littlefoot, she hatches in the first film, and is later separated from her parents and sisters during an earthquake. She accompanies Littlefoot to the Great Valley where she is eventually reunited with her father. She is stubborn, boastful, sometimes reckless, and occasionally belligerent, but is often made to look foolish when she is proven wrong. The initial film, and a few sequels, attributed an ego to her species, especially to herself and her father, but this is diminished in later appearances. In the Invasion of the Tinysauruses, her dad begins a new relationship with a Threehorn named Tria, who Cera initially dislikes, but eventually comes to accept. By the following film, Tria and Cera's father have become mates, and have a child named Tricia, Cera's half-sister.

The character was originally conceived as a male Triceratops named "Bambo", but was changed to a female named "Cera" at the suggestion of producer George Lucas midway through animation of the first film. Hal Hinson of The Washington Post called Cera "a fiercely cute and rambunctious little dynamo" in his review of the 1988 original, with critic Mark R. Leeper likewise calling her "cute and pugnacious". She was the main character of the 2001 children's book The Land Before Time: Cera's Big Day Out by Molly Goode, Judy Freudeberg, and Tony Geiss, as well as the 2007 book Cera's Shiny Stone based on the TV series episode "The Canyon of Shiny Stones".

=== Ducky ===
Ducky, voiced by Judith Barsi (I), Heather Hogan (II-IV) and Aria Noelle Curzon (V-XIV, TV series), is a green female Saurolophus, known colloquially as a "Big Mouth", "Duck Bill" or "Swimmer". She was one of the young dinosaurs who accompanied Littlefoot to the Great Valley when she was separated from her family. After arriving in her new home, her mother adopted the orphaned Spike, who became her foster younger brother. She has numerous biological siblings, with many being born in the original film and Journey of the Brave. Characterized as having an energetic, cheerful and child-like personality, she speaks enthusiastically, often replying to things in triplicate ("Yep, yep, yep!" or "Nope, nope, nope!") and usually avoiding the use of contractions.

The series' official website referred to her as a Parasaurolophus, while other sources have referred to her as an Anatosaurus.

=== Petrie ===
Petrie, voiced by Will Ryan (I) and Jeff Bennett (II-XIV, TV series), is a brown male Pteranodon, or "Flyer". He is characterized as panicky and anxious, and traveled with Littlefoot to find his mother and siblings in the Great Valley while learning the basics of flight along the way. He is talkative, but speaks in broken English, usually omitting such linking verbs as "is", "are", and "am", using "me" in place of "I", and referring to himself in third person. He was originally meant to have a larger role in his debut, but much of his screen time was given to Ducky due to how impressed the producers were with Judith Barsi's performance. He was a central character in the twelfth film The Great Day of the Flyers.

The producers of the original film had difficulty deciding on a voice for the character until it was suggested by Steven Spielberg's son, Max, that he sound similar to Digit from the previous Don Bluth film, An American Tail. Digit's voice actor Will Ryan was then asked to fill the role. Petrie is the only one of the original five principal characters that is not a dinosaur.

The series' official website referred to him as a Pterodactyl.

=== Spike ===
Spike, possibly effects by Frank Welker (I), then voiced by Rob Paulsen (II-V, VII-XIV, TV series) and Jeff Bennett (VI), is a green male Stegosaurus or "Spiketail". Despite being the largest, he is actually the youngest of the original main characters; his hatching being witnessed by Ducky whose parents later adopted him. He is characterized as gluttonous, laid-back and rarely speaks, communicating mostly in grunts or scat singing. During the fourth film, Journey Through the Mists, he speaks for the first time, calling Ducky's name, and again in the eighth film The Big Freeze, where he calls out to his mother. In the same film, it is mentioned that his birth parents were probably lost in the earthquake of the first film, and becomes close friends with another Stegosaurus named Tippy. The TV series episode "Through the Eyes of a Spiketail", is told largely from Spike's point of view, where he speaks, internally, with a low voice, and can "hear" the song of plants that guide him to them.

Spike's design was based on Bluth's pet Chow Chow, Cubby, with the director commenting that he had a personal fondness for the character, calling him "a pure soul, simple, accommodating, and eager to please". He has been described by journalists as the "fat kid" of the group, "quiet and shy", and a "tagalong".

=== Chomper ===
Chomper, voiced by Rob Paulsen (II), Cannon Young (V), Max Burkholder (TV series), and Issac Ryan Brown (XIV) is a purple male Tyrannosaurus or "Sharptooth". He first appeared in the second film, The Great Valley Adventure, as a newborn hatchling whom Littlefoot and the others attempt to raise before returning him to his parents. He re-appeared as a supporting character in the fifth film The Mysterious Island, in which he is now able to speak the language of both Sharpteeth and leaf-eaters, but must convince his parents and Cera that both groups can get along. He became a main character in the TV series, having migrated to the Great Valley under the care of Ruby, and attempts to discover how its residents can live in harmony so he can pass this knowledge to his own kind. He is also known for having an amazing sense of smell, which comes in handy on occasion. Chomper also appears in the fourteenth film Journey of the Brave, when he attempts to greet Wild Arms, who passes out.

In his debut in The Great Valley Adventure, Steve Rhodes of Rotten Tomatoes UK commended the character's design, calling him "a real scene stealer". Chomper is the star of the children's book The Lonely Dinosaur, based on the TV series episode "The Lonely Journey".

=== Ruby ===
Ruby, voiced by Meghan Strange, is a pink female Oviraptor or "Fast Runner", who first appeared in the television series, debuting in the inaugural episode "The Cave of Many Voices". Originally from the Mysterious Beyond, she meets Chomper and agrees to accompany him to the Great Valley after being separated from her parents and two siblings from being ambushed by a Sharptooth named Red Claw. Later, she reunites with her family in the episode "Return to Hanging Rock", but returns to the Valley in order to keep looking after Chomper as she promised his parents. She made her film debut in the fourteenth film Journey of the Brave. Ruby is characterized as being the wisest of her friends, giving advice or encouragement, and often makes repetitive or redundant statements ("Hello my friends, my friends hello" or "I think I need to go do some thinking at my thinking place").

== Secondary characters ==
=== Grandpa and Grandma Longneck ===
Grandpa Longneck, voiced by Bill Erwin (I) and Kenneth Mars (II – XII, TV series) and Barry Bostwick (XIV), and Grandma Longneck, voiced by Linda Gary (II – IV) and Miriam Flynn (V – XIV, TV series), are two elder bluish gray Apatosaurus and are Littlefoot's maternal grandparents. They are his primary caregivers after his mother's death; whereas Grandpa Longneck, together with Topsy, serves as a leader of the combined herds of the Great Valley. Littlefoot idolizes his grandfather. Although both elders seldom fight, each is fully capable of opposing a tyrannosaur.

Grandma and Grandpa Longneck appear in all of the Land Before Time films, and in many episodes of the TV series. Their names have never been given: all the characters (even they themselves) address them by title, or by the species name of "Longneck". Only Bron, their son-in-law, calls them something different, identifying them as "Papa and Mama Longneck".

=== Ducky and Spike's Mother ===
Ducky and Spike's mother, voiced by Tress MacNeille (II-XI, TV series) and Meghan Strange (XIV), is a brown Saurolophus who appears in most of the films. Ducky and Spike's father appears in the initial film and The Big Freeze. Their mother is a kindly, attentive figure, and is treated with respect by all children and adults in the Great Valley. She occasionally has doubts on whether to raise Spike in keeping with her own values or with those of his racial heritage; this was seen in The Big Freeze when a herd met and befriended Spike, but Spike recognises her as his mother and remains with his adoptive family rather than the herd.

=== Petrie's mother ===
Petrie's mother, voiced by Tress MacNeille (II-XII, TV series) and Anndi McAfee (XIV), is a cerulean Pteranodon and has major appearances in The Mysterious Island, The Stone of Cold Fire, and The Great Day of the Flyers. In the seventh film, she flies to the "Mysterious Beyond" to find Petrie and Ducky, blaming her brother Pterano for endangering them.

=== Ducky and Spike's siblings ===
Ducky and Spike have several siblings. In the first film, Ducky's parents' nest contained about half a dozen eggs, whereas in the second film, Ducky's parents have another nest from which several are hatched.

=== Petrie's siblings ===
Petrie’s siblings (Voiced by Jeff Bennett, Nika Futterman and Susan Blu) have appeared in various movies and episodes throughout the series.

=== Daddy Topps ===
Daddy Topps, voiced by Burke Byrnes (I), John Ingle (II – XIII, TV series) and George Ball (XIV), is a dark grey Triceratops and Cera's father. He was credited as "Daddy Topps" in the first film and is otherwise called "Mr. Threehorn". In Invasion of the Tinysauruses, Tria refers to him by the pet name "Topsy", much to the annoyance of Cera. He is portrayed as belligerent, domineering, sometimes hostile and stubborn like his daughter.

=== Tria ===
Tria, voiced by Camryn Manheim (XI – XII) and Jessica Gee (XIII, TV series), is Topps' second mate. Tria is introduced in Invasion of the Tinysauruses, where she is opposed by Cera until later in the story. Tria and Topps have a child in The Great Day of the Flyers.

=== Tricia ===
Tricia, voiced by Nika Futterman (XII) and Meghan Strange (TV series), is Topsy and Tria's daughter and Cera's half-sister. Tricia is introduced in The Land Before Time XII: The Great Day of the Flyers.

== Recurring characters ==
=== Ali ===
Ali, voiced by Juliana Hansen (IV) and Nika Futterman (TV series), is a young female pink (IV) and purple (TV series) Apatosaurus, who first appeared in The Land Before Time IV: Journey Through the Mists. She quickly befriends Littlefoot, but is wary of the other main characters since they are not Longnecks. However, she befriends them after they all cooperate against common danger. She is their guide through the 'Land of Mists' through which her family formerly traveled. Ali appears again in the TV episode "The Brave Longneck Scheme".

=== Old One ===
Old One, voiced by Carol Bruce (IV) and Jessica Walter (TV series), is an old female Apatosaurus who is the matriarch of the tribe of migrating longnecks, which includes Ali, who first appeared in The Land Before Time IV: Journey Through the Mists. She is old and wise and bears a prominent scar (or perhaps just advanced age creases) on the left side of her face. Her long life of constant migration has given her much life experience, allowing her to speak on topics that others find hard to believe. Old One appears again in the TV episode "The Brave Longneck Scheme".

=== Mr. Thicknose ===
The elderly Mr. Thicknose is voiced by Robert Guillaume (VIII) and Dorian Harewood (TV series) is an old male Pachyrhinosaurus. In his first appearance, The Land Before Time VIII: The Big Freeze, he is a very respected resident of the Great Valley, having convinced the others that he has been everywhere and seen everything. When snow falls in the Valley for the first known time, and he is unable to explain it, the other adults lose faith in him. While stranded in the Mysterious Beyond, he reveals to the children, to whom he acted as a teacher, that most of his knowledge comes from secondary sources. Despite this, he is able to use the knowledge he learned to guide them back to the Great Valley.

=== Shorty ===
Shorty, voiced by Brandon Michael DePaul (X) and E. G. Daily (TV series) is a young dark green Brachiosaurus who first appears in The Land Before Time X: The Great Longneck Migration. When Bron found Shorty, he was defending a group of much younger dinosaurs. Shorty bullies Littlefoot at first; he antagonizes him until Littlefoot decides that he can be his adopted older brother, and Shorty accepts. In the end, while Littlefoot decides to stay with his grandparents, Shorty stays with Bron.

=== Tippy ===
Tippy, voiced by Jeremy Suarez (VIII) and Cree Summer (TV series), is a pinkish orange Stegosaurus who first appeared in The Land Before Time VIII: The Big Freeze in which his herd migrates into the Great Valley temporarily, after which he quickly befriends Spike. Unlike Spike, Tippy, though with limited use of words, is very vocal.

=== Bron ===
Bron, voiced by Kiefer Sutherland (X) and Cam Clarke (TV series), and Scott Whyte (XIV) is a brown Apatosaurus, the father of Littlefoot, the adoptive father of Shorty, and the son-in-law of Grandpa and Grandma Longneck. He first appears in The Land Before Time X: The Great Longneck Migration, wherein Bron reveals that he was separated from his wife and in-laws before Littlefoot hatched. Although Littlefoot and Bron are affectionate, they separate at the end of the film, promising to reunite. Bron eventually fulfills this in the TV episode "The Big Longneck Test", in which he tests Littlefoot's skills at leadership. He reappears in the 14th film Journey of The Brave, where he is trapped near a volcano and is hurt, which urges Littlefoot and his friends to journey there to rescue him. He is shown to have great admiration for Littlefoot's friends and is deeply proud of the children's determination to save him.

=== Hyp, Mutt and Nod ===
Hyp, Mutt and Nod are a trio of adolescent dinosaurs, who first appeared in The Land Before Time III: The Time of the Great Giving, in which they often bully Littlefoot, Cera, and the others. It is also implied and later revealed near the end of the film that Hyp the gray Hypsilophodon behaves in this manner because of the aggressive treatment that he receives from his father. His lackey, Mutt the Muttaburrasaurus, is shown to be much softer-hearted, as well as dim-witted, whereas Hyp's other lackey, Nod the nodosaur, frequently emphasizes Hyp's statements, as well as allowing him to ride on his back. They become friends with the others after all eight cooperate against a pack of "Fast Biters".

The trio appear again in the season one finale of the television series, "The Great Egg Adventure".

In the film, they were voiced by Whit Hertford (Hyp), Jeff Bennett (Mutt), and Scott Menville (Nod). In the TV series, Bennett and Menville resume their roles, but Hyp is voiced by Mikey Kelley.

=== Mo ===
Mo, voiced by Rob Paulsen, is a colorful Ophthalmosaurus who first appeared in The Land Before Time IX: Journey to Big Water. The character is bilingual, speaking a broken form of the herbivore language, as well as his native dolphin-like language. He is very playful, and becomes popular with the main characters aside from Cera, who is at first annoyed by his playful antics.

Though the character's only prominent roles are in the ninth film and in the TV episode "The Missing Fast-Water Adventure", he has made a few appearances in the films. In The Great Longneck Migration, he jumps out of the water during the song "Adventuring", and he says "And fly!" during the song "Flip, Flap and Fly" in The Great Day of the Flyers.

=== Doc ===
Doc, voiced by Kris Kristofferson (VI) and Jeff Bennett (TV series), is a nomadic elderly grayish blue Diplodocus. In his first appearance, The Land Before Time VI: The Secret of Saurus Rock, he saves Littlefoot shortly after arriving in the Great Valley and Littlefoot idolizes him thereafter as the legendary "Lone Dinosaur", who purportedly saved the Great Valley from a particularly powerful Sharptooth long before; Doc's own statements about having visited the Great Valley before, as well as a large scar on his face resembling one of the legend, support Littlefoot's ideas. At the end of the film, after Doc and Grandpa Longneck defeat two marauding dinosaurs together, Doc leaves the Valley. He appears again in the TV episode "The Lone Dinosaur Returns", in which he now has a lady-friend. During the episode, he is initially appalled by Littlefoot's friendship with Chomper, but is gradually convinced to respect the latter.

=== Guido ===
Guido, voiced by Rob Paulsen, is a teal Microraptor who first appears in The Land Before Time XII: The Great Day of the Flyers. He is convinced that he's the only one of his kind, having never seen another of his kind before. His origins are unknown, as he apparently has no idea what he is or where he came from. Though he tries to fly, he can only glide for a brief period of time. He reappears in the TV episode "The Hermit of Black Rock", in which he meets an old blind purple pterosaur named Swooper (voiced by Jess Harnell) and learns to fly properly. Guido often appears neurotic or panicky at times, and easily confused.

== Supporting characters ==
=== Chomper's parents ===
Chomper's parents are featured in Chomper's first two film appearances. They are sexually dimorphic, with Chomper's father being dark green and his mother having an olive green color. They are very protective of their son, as when they invade the Great Valley to search for his egg in The Land Before Time II: The Great Valley Adventure, and fighting to protect him in The Mysterious Island. Although the two initially treat the protagonists as prey, they promise to spare them, as a reward for rescuing Chomper. They are unique among Sharpteeth as the audience is shown what they are saying via subtitles. They entrust Ruby to take care of Chomper in the Great Valley after Red Claw separated them from their families.

=== Littlefoot's mother ===
Littlefoot's mother, voiced by Helen Shaver, dies in the first film to save Littlefoot and Cera from the Sharptooth pursuing them. Before her death, she is Littlefoot's teacher and caregiver, and introduces the story's principal themes. After death, she appears as a ghost to reveal his destination. She is also shown in a flashback scene in The Land Before Time X: The Great Longneck Migration.

=== Rhett ===
Rhett (voiced by Elizabeth Daily) is a new friend of Littlefoot's friend Ali, who is introduced in the TV series episode "The Brave Longneck Scheme". He initially had an arrogant personality and tried to pass himself off as a hero.

=== Tippy's mother ===
Tippy's mother (voiced by Susan Krebs) is a kindly female Stegosaurus who invites Spike to spend time with her herd upon learning that he has been adopted by another species and has not spent time around his species. She later invites him to travel with the herd when they leave the Valley in search of food during the freeze. She and her son, together with their herd, reappear in the episode "The Forbidden Friendship".

=== Spiketail Leader ===
Spiketail Leader (voiced by Rob Paulsen) is the leader of Tippy’s herd, appears with Tippy, his Mother and their herd in The Land Before Time VIII: The Big Freeze and in the episode "The Forbidden Friendship".

=== Ruby's Family ===
Ruby's Family (Parents voiced by Rob Paulsen and Nika Futterman, siblings voiced by Jeff Bennett and Meghan Strange) is a family of Oviraptors, who appeared in "The Star Day Celebration" and "Return to Hanging Rock".

=== Mrs. Twoped ===
Mrs. Twoped was an unseen friend of Tria around the time of Tricia's hatching. After Tricia ran for the very first time in The Land Before Time XII: The Great Day of the Flyers, Tria remarked that she could not wait to tell Mrs. Twoped about it.

== Allies ==
=== Tinysauruses ===
The Tinysauruses are an underground colony of Mussaurus who appear in The Land Before Time XI: Invasion of the Tinysauruses. Their leader is old and cranky but warm-hearted with a huge voice, named Big Daddy (voiced by Michael Clarke Duncan) along with his daughter Lizzie (Cree Summer). Other individuals include Skitter (Leigh Kelly), Dusty (Ashley Rose Orr) and Rocky (Nika Futterman).

The Tinysauruses make a brief appearance in The Great Day of the Flyers, and later are mentioned in the TV episode "Stranger From the Mysterious Above".

=== Kosh ===
Kosh, voiced by Rob Paulsen (III, XI – XII), Jeff Bennett (V, TV series) and Pete Sepenuk (TV series), is a gluttonous, pink Ankylosaurus who appears in some of The Land Before Time films and the TV series. He is almost always seen eating, and usually ends up having his meal disturbed or interrupted in some way. He is also rather quick to anger. He is usually the first to agree with Mr. Threehorn, but often argues with him too.

=== Rooter ===
Rooter, voiced by Pat Hingle (who also narrated the first film), is an old male Scolosaurus who consoles Littlefoot after his mother has died. His only appearance was in the first film.

=== Foobie ===
Foobie, voiced by Pete Sepenuk, is a mute "Yellow Belly" who is considered the wise one of his herd. Foobie makes friends with Spike. He appears in The Land Before Time XIII: The Wisdom of Friends.

=== Hidden Runner ===
Hidden Runner, voiced by Rob Paulsen, is a green and blue theropod whose only appearance is in the TV series episode "The Spooky Nighttime Adventure". Hidden Runner has the ability to blend in with its habitat due to its multi-colored markings.

=== Loofah and Doofah ===
Loofah and Doofah are two "Yellow Bellies" who appear in The Land Before Time XIII: The Wisdom of Friends. Loofah is voiced by Cuba Gooding Jr. and Doofah by Sandra Oh. Loofah is the cheerful leader of a herd of Yellow bellies who are looking for the Berry Valley. Doofah is a prominent female in her herd, and is equally friendly and optimistic. Both of them have short-term memory loss and are motivated by impulsive needs.

=== Milo, Lydia and Plower ===
Milo, Lydia and Plower are three Ceratogaulus featured in the TV episode "Stranger From the Mysterious Above". They believe Spike to be "The Big Wise One". Milo was voiced by Rob Paulsen, Plower by Meghan Strange, and Lydia by Anndi McAfee.

=== Archie ===
Archie is a male Archelon who lives in a cave system just outside the Land of Mists. He appears in The Land Before Time IV: Journey Through the Mists where he guides Littlefoot and his friends through the caves. He is voiced by Charles Durning.

=== Tickles ===
Tickles is a mammal who appears in The Land Before Time IV: Journey Through the Mists. He is voiced by Frank Welker.

=== Elsie ===
Elsie is a green female Elasmosaurus who returns Littlefoot, Ducky, Cera, Petrie, and Spike to their families at the end of The Land Before Time V: The Mysterious Island. She is voiced by Christina Pickles.

=== Dinah and Dana ===
Dinah and Dana are Cera's niece and nephew who appear in The Land Before Time VI: The Secret of Saurus Rock. They are voiced by Sandy Fox and Nancy Cartwright.

=== Sue ===
Sue is a female Supersaurus who saved Littlefoot from a Belly Dragger by crushing its face in The Land Before Time X: The Great Longneck Migration. Sue is kind and gentle. She is voiced by Bernadette Peters.

=== Pat ===
Pat is an elderly Apatosaurus who appears in The Land Before Time X: The Great Longneck Migration and is voiced by James Garner.

=== Saro ===
Saro is a male Apatosaurus who is an old friend of Grandpa Longneck, who has been interested in the stories of the longnecks all his life. He appears in the episode of the TV episode "The Legend of the Story Speaker". He is voiced by Pete Sepenuk.

=== Rainbow Faces ===
Rainbow Faces are a pair of theropods who appear in The Land Before Time VII: The Stone of Cold Fire. They show scientific knowledge exceeding that attributed to other characters. The male Rainbow Face also appears in The Invasion of the Tinysauruses. The male Rainbow Face is voiced by Charles Kimbrough, The female Rainbow Face is voiced by Patti Deutsch while B.J. Ward does her singing voice.

=== Dara ===
Dara is a wandering female Diplodocus who first appeared in the TV episode "The Lone Dinosaur Returns". She is the lady-friend of Doc, the "Lone Dinosaur". She is voiced by Susan Blu.

=== Swooper ===
Petrie and Guido meet the blind and elderly Swooper in Black Rock in the TV episode "The Hermit of Black Rock". He is voiced by Jess Harnell.

=== Skip ===
Skip is a mammal who appears in the episode "Return to Hanging Rock". He is voiced by Jeff Bennett.

=== Etta ===
Etta is a yellow Pteranodon who appears in The Land Before Time XIV: Journey of the Brave. After Littlefoot meets her while looking for shelter during a "Sand cloud", she forces Littlefoot into a cave. To cheer up the downtrodden Longneck, Etta tells Littlefoot to "look for the light". Etta has a burn mark on her arm when a small lava bomb hit her when she was near a volcano called Fire Mountain. She is voiced by Reba McEntire.

=== Wild Arms ===
Wild Arms is a Nothronychus who notifies Littlefoot and the rest of the valley that Bron has been imperiled in the Mysterious Beyond. Appearing in The Land Before Time XIV: Journey of the Brave, Wild Arms is selfish, cowardly and somewhat mean spirited. He is narcissistic and reluctant to help others. He is voiced by Damon Wayans Jr.

== Villains ==
=== Sharptooth ===
Sharptooth is a strong, athletic, and powerful dark green Tyrannosaurus and the main antagonist of the first film, injured in pursuit of Littlefoot and Cera, and the slayer of Littlefoot's mother. Having fallen into a crack in the earth during an earthquake, he remains comatose until awoken by Cera and thereafter pursues them until the end of the film, wherein they drown him in a lake.

In the book adaptation of the first film, he appears to have a grudge against them after Littlefoot inadvertently injured his right eye; during his first encounter with him.

=== Egg Stealer ===
An "Egg Stealer", that almost took Littlefoot's egg, appeared in the first film.

=== Ozzy and Strut ===
Ozzy and Strut are a pair of Struthiomimus brothers who appear in The Land Before Time II: The Great Valley Adventure. They are driven from the Valley by Chomper's parents. Ozzy and Strut are voiced by Jeff Bennett and Rob Paulsen, both with British accents.

=== Dil and Ichy ===
Dil and Ichy appear in The Land Before Time IV: Journey Through the Mists. Dil is a female "big-mouthed bellydragger" (Deinosuchus), while Ichy is a male "sharp beak" (Ichthyornis). They pursue Littlefoot and his friends throughout the film, but often quarrel among themselves, partly because of the lack of food and partly because Dil is very nearsighted. Dil is voiced by Tress MacNeille and Ichy by Jeff Bennett.

=== Pterano ===
Pterano, voiced by Michael York, is an orange-brown Pteranodon from The Land Before Time VII: The Stone of Cold Fire who is Petrie and his siblings' uncle, but exiled from the herd for abandoning his own followers.

=== Rinkus and Sierra ===
Rinkus and Sierra are the henchmen of Pterano in The Land Before Time VII: The Stone of Cold Fire. Rinkus is a pink Rhamphorhynchus voiced by Rob Paulsen with a Cockney accent and Sierra is a brown Cearadactylus voiced by Jim Cummings with a somewhat Southern accent.

=== Red Claw ===
Red Claw is a gray Tyrannosaurus, voiced by Pete Sepenuk. He has a distinctive scar extending from his left eye to his left hand and bright red claws. He separated Chomper and Ruby from their families leading them to move to the Great Valley. He appears as the main antagonist of the show.

=== Screech and Thud ===
Screech and Thud are a pair of Deinonychus, voiced by Pete Sepenuk and Rob Paulsen, respectively, and are companions of Red Claw.

=== Great Hideous Beast ===
The Great Hideous Beast (voiced by Dorian Harewood) is a Microceratus who lives in the caves alongside horned gophers. He appears in the TV episode "Stranger From the Mysterious Above".

=== Scuttle ===
Scuttle (voiced by Kevin Michael Richardson) is the leader of the "Sand Creepers" appears in the TV episode "March of the Sand Creepers".

=== Unnamed sharpteeth ===
Many "sharpteeth" are featured in Land Before Time films and television:

- A Dimetrodon appeared in the first film.
- A Tyrannosaurus that looks like Chomper's dad appeared in the opening narration of The Land Before Time II: The Great Valley Adventure.
- A trio of small, quilled Sharpteeth appeared in the opening narration to The Land Before Time III: The Time of the Great Giving.
- A duo of quilled dromaeosaurs appeared in the opening narration of The Land Before Time III: The Time of the Great Giving battling a Chasmosaurus.
- A pack of Fast Biters (Velociraptors), voiced by Frank Welker, appeared near the end of The Land Before Time III: The Time of the Great Giving.
- Two marine reptiles appeared in the opening narration in The Land Before Time IV: Journey Through the Mists.
- A Tyrannosaurus also appeared in the opening narration to The Land Before Time IV: Journey Through the Mists chasing a flock of small ornithopods.
- A "Swimming Sharptooth" (plesiosaur) appeared near the end of The Land Before Time IV: Journey Through the Mists chasing Dil away.
- A Tyrannosaurus that looks like Chomper's mom appeared in the opening narration of The Land Before Time V: The Mysterious Island.
- A "Swimming Sharptooth" (shark) appeared in The Land Before Time V: The Mysterious Island.
- A distinctive Sharptooth with dorsal armor and small horns (Carnotaurus) appeared in The Land Before Time V: The Mysterious Island.
- The "biggest, meanest, most ferocious Sharptooth ever" (Tyrannosaurus) appeared in The Land Before Time VI: The Secret of Saurus Rock film during Littlefoot's grandpa's story of the Lone Dinosaur.
- An Allosaurus, voiced by Danny Mann, appeared in The Land Before Time VI: The Secret of Saurus Rock and in a recreated flashback in “The Lone Dinosaur Returns”.
- A Tyrannosaurus appeared along with the Allosaurus in the climax of the sixth film. More Tyrannosaurids would appear in opening narrations and in “The Legend of the Lone Dinosaur” song.
- A pack of Fast Biters (dromaeosaurs) appeared in The Land Before Time VII: The Stone of Cold Fire in a flashback.
- A Tyrannosaurus appeared in The Land Before Time VIII: The Big Freeze wandering around the landscape during a blizzard.
- A pliosaur "Sharptooth Swimmer" (Liopleurodon) appeared in The Land Before Time IX: Journey to Big Water.
- A Tyrannosaurus appeared in the opening narration to The Land Before Time X: The Great Longneck Migration fighting an Apatosaurus.
- A Bellydragger (crocodilians) appeared in The Land Before Time X: The Great Longneck Migration.
- A trio of Sharpteeth (Tyrannosaurus) appeared in The Land Before Time X: The Great Longneck Migration.
- A pair of large Fast Biters (Velociraptors) appeared in The Land Before Time XI: Invasion of the Tinysauruses.
- A sail-backed Sharptooth (Spinosaurus) appeared in The Land Before Time XII: The Great Day of the Flyers.
- A Tyrannosaurus appeared in the opening narration to The Land Before Time XIII: The Wisdom of Friends chasing a massive pack of dromaeosaurs.
- A quartet of long-snouted Sharpteeth appeared in The Land Before Time XIII: The Wisdom of Friends, led by a purple-brown individual with a scar running over its jaw.
- Pairs of fantasy Sharpteeth (Tyrannosaurus) appeared in Rhett's story in the episode "The Brave Longneck Scheme".
- A trio of Fast Biters (Deinonychus) appeared in the episode "The Lonely Journey".
- A stampede of Fast Biters (dromaeosaurs) appeared in the episode "The Lonely Journey" being pursued by Red Claw.
- A family of Sharpteeth (large theropods) also appeared in the episode "The Lonely Journey".
- A pair of fantasy Tyrannosaurus and a Deinonychus appear in the episode “The Spooky Nightmare Adventure” in a spooky legend.
- A pair of sail-backed Sharpteeth (Spinosaurus) appeared in the episode "The Hermit of Black Rock".
- A pack of big-mouthed Bellydraggers (crocodilians) appeared in the episode "The Amazing Threehorn Girl".
- A mother Fast Biter (Deinonychus) appeared in the episode "The Great Egg Adventure". She and Screech are a lot alike, the only difference is that her eyes are red. The mother Deinonychus has 3 Deinonychus babies.
- A Tyrannosaurus appeared in the opening narration to The Land Before Time XIV: Journey of the Brave fighting a Stegosaurus.
- A pair of Featherhead Sharpteeth (Yutyrannus) appeared in The Land Before Time XIV: Journey of the Brave.
- A horned Sharptooth (Carnotaurus) also appeared in Journey of the Brave.
