= The Land Before Time IV: Journey Through the Mists =

- Original VHS cover
- Directed by: Roy Allen Smith
- Written by: Dev Ross
- Based on: Characters by Judy Freudberg; Tony Geiss
- Produced by: Roy Allen Smith
- Starring: Jeff Bennett; Carol Bruce; Charles Durning; Linda Gary; Juliana Hansen; Heather Hogan; Candace Hutson; John Ingle; Kenneth Mars; Tress MacNeille; Scott McAfee; Rob Paulsen; Frank Welker
- Edited by: Warren Taylor
- Music by: Michael Tavera; James Horner (themes)
- Production company: Universal Cartoon Studios
- Distributed by: MCA/Universal Home Video
- Release date: December 10, 1996
- Running time: 74 minutes
- Country: United States
- Language: English

The Land Before Time IV: Journey Through the Mists is a 1996 American direct-to-video animated adventure musical film produced by Universal Cartoon Studios and directed by Roy Allen Smith. It is the fourth installment in the Land Before Time series as well as the final installment to feature any cast members from the original film. The Land Before Time IV: Journey Through the Mists was released by MCA/Universal Home Video on December 10, 1996. The film was nominated for two Annie Awards. This was also the final film to feature Linda Gary as the voice of Grandma Longneck, as she died on October 5, 1995.

== Plot ==
Littlefoot notices Longnecks entering the Great Valley and informs his grandparents, who say that the Longnecks are their cousins and that they must greet them. The leader, the Old One, tells the Great Valley's residents that her herd had come there since a period of rain turned their old home into "The Land of Mists," a marshland which became the home of dangerous creatures. Littlefoot meets Ali, a female Longneck, and invites her to play. He introduces her to his friends, but being not used to associating with diverse species, she is afraid of them. Meanwhile, Littlefoot's Grandpa becomes ill. According to the Old One, the illness is lethal to any dinosaur and can only be cured by eating the petals of the "golden night flower", which only grows in the Land of Mists. When Littlefoot's Grandma asks who should take her to the night flower, the Longnecks refuse to take her there due to the risk.

Knowing that his grandpa could die, Littlefoot is determined to save him and asks Ali to take him there. She agrees on the condition that Cera, Ducky, Petrie and Spike do not come along, claiming that they will only slow them down. As the pair pass through a cave, an earthshake causes stalagmites and stalactites to crash down, separating them. Ali returns to the Valley and convinces Littlefoot's friends to help her free him. Meanwhile, Littlefoot tries to find a way out and meets Archie, an old male Archelon who helps him dig through the rocks. Littlefoot and Archie are eventually interrupted by a mostly-blind Deinosuchus named Dil and an Ichthyornis named Ichy, who intend to eat them. Dil and Ichy pursue Littlefoot and Archie, but are knocked out when Ali and Littlefoot's friends dig a hole in a nearby wall and send rocks tumbling down on them. Archie shows Littlefoot and his friends a way to the Land of Mists and reminds them to stay close together before departing. In the Land of Mists, Cera is separated from the group. The others meet a Megazostrodon that Ducky names Tickles.

Tickles helps them find Cera. However, Cera falls into a river and is pursued by Dil and Ichy. Ali saves Cera and distracts the predators, after which Cera softens her earlier stance towards Ali. Later, Ali explains her prejudicial behavior, having never interacted with species outside of her own, but remarks that her attitude towards Littlefoot's friends has now changed. The seven stop for the night and realize they are in a field of night flowers after they bloom and stock up on them. As they make their way home, Ichy and Dil return for another attack. During a chase, Petrie is grabbed by Ichy but rescued by Tickles, who tricks Ichy into biting Dil's tail rather than Petrie, giving him time to rejoin his friends. Dil becomes upset at Ichy, but they resume the chase after Cera gives their alternate hiding spot away, during which Ducky falls into a river and becomes unconscious. Spike then speaks for the first time by calling out Ducky's name, which awakens her as she is about to be consumed by Dil. Ichy comes up to Littlefoot and says that he and the others are going to be his and Dil's next targets. Ducky escapes when Spike uses his tail to knock Ichy toward Dil's open jaws as she tries to consume Ducky, but she instead gets Ichy after mistaking him for Ducky. Ichy escapes that, and the two get into another argument. The two eventually declare that they have had enough of each other and are going their separate ways forever. Later, after swatting Ichy away with her tail, Dil bumps into a Hydrotherosaurus, who chases her away.

With their enemies gone, Littlefoot and company say goodbye to Tickles and head home. They give Littlefoot’s Grandpa the flowers to eat and he fully recovers hours later. Ali then leaves with her herd, but not before saying goodbye to Littlefoot and his friends.

== Voice cast ==
- Scott McAfee as Littlefoot
- Juliana Hansen as Ali
- Candace Hutson as Cera
- Heather Hogan as Ducky
- Rob Paulsen as Spike
- Jeff Bennett as Petrie / Ichy
- Tress MacNeille as Ali's Mother / Dil
- Frank Welker as Tickles
- Linda Gary as Grandma Longneck (in her final film role before her death of complications from brain cancer on October 5, 1995)
- Kenneth Mars as Grandpa Longneck
- Charles Durning as Archie
- Carol Bruce as Old One
- John Ingle as Narrator

== Songs ==
All tracks are written by Leslie Bricusse.

No.	Title	Performer(s)	Length
1.	"Grandma's Lullaby"	Linda Gary
2.	"Who Needs You?"	Tress MacNeille & Jeff Bennett
3.	"It Takes All Sorts"	Juliana Hansen, Scott McAfee, Candace Hutson, Heather Hogan & Jeff Bennett
4.	"If We Hold on Together"

== Release ==
The film was released on December 10, 1996 on VHS and April 1, 2003 on DVD.

== Reception ==
Joe Leydon of Variety recommended it to young children who enjoy Barney & Friends. TV Guide rated it 2/5 stars and wrote: "Memories of Don Bluth's engaging original The Land Before Time continue to grow dimmer with this indifferent sequel to the animated dinosaur saga". Michael Sauter of Entertainment Weekly rated a letter grade of "B" and wrote: "But if the formula hasn't changed, it hasn't fossilized, either". In August 2014, the New York Post ranked each of the 13 Land Before Time films released up to that point and placed Journey Through the Mists at number 7. The New York Post praised the character of Ali for adding "a little more girl power" to the series. The film received nominations for "Best Animated Video Production" and "Best Individual Achievement: Music in a Feature/Home Video Production" at the 25th Annie Awards in 1997, losing to Aladdin and the King of Thieves and Cats Don't Dance, respectively.

Award	Date	Nomination	Nominee	Result
Annie Award	November 16, 1997	Best Animated Video Production	The Land Before Time IV	Nominated
Annie Award	November 16, 1997	Best Music in a Home Video Production	The Land Before Time IV	Nominated

== See also ==
- List of films featuring dinosaurs
