= The Land Before Time II: The Great Valley Adventure =

- Original VHS cover
- Directed by: Roy Allen Smith
- Written by: John Loy; John Ludin; Dev Ross
- Based on: characters by: Judy Freudberg; Tony Geiss
- Produced by: Roy Allen Smith
- Starring: Jeff Bennett; Linda Gary; Heather Hogan; Candace Hutson; John Ingle; Kenneth Mars; Scott McAfee; Rob Paulsen
- Edited by: Jay Bixsen
- Music by: Michael Tavera; James Horner (archive music)
- Production company: Universal Cartoon Studios
- Distributed by: MCA/Universal Home Video
- Release dates: December 23, 1994 (LaserDisc); December 26, 1994 (VHS)
- Running time: 75 minutes
- Country: United States
- Language: English

The Land Before Time II: The Great Valley Adventure is a 1994 American direct-to-video animated adventure musical film directed by Roy Allen Smith without any involvement, support and input from Don Bluth. It is the second installment and a sequel to the 1988 film The Land Before Time. It was first released by MCA/Universal Home Video on LaserDisc on December 23, 1994, for retail availability – and on VHS on December 26, 1994, for national-availability advertising, six years after the original and was the first in the series to be a direct-to-video production.

== Plot ==
Littlefoot, Cera, Ducky, Petrie, and Spike live a carefree life in the Great Valley under their families' watchful eyes. One day, the gang attempts to get to the sheltering grass to play, but land in the sinking sand surrounding it. The adults rescue them and chastise them for their recklessness. The next night, the children have a secret meeting and decide to prove their bravery and maturity by venturing into the Mysterious Beyond, a location outside the Valley that is inhabited by Sharpteeth. Before they leave, they notice two eggnappers, Ozzy and Strut, stealing an egg from the nest of Ducky's mother. The children pursue the intruders into the Mysterious Beyond. During a thunderstorm, an ensuing landslide damages the Great Wall that surrounds the Valley and protects it from the Sharpteeth, and the stolen egg rolls safely back to the nest, but the group does not notice this in the confusion.

In the Mysterious Beyond, the group discover another, larger egg and mistake it for the original. The gang transports the egg into the Valley, and despite finding the original egg back in Ducky's nest, they decide to hatch it. The gang doesn't realize it's from another nest. The egg eventually hatches, revealing a baby Sharptooth. Although Littlefoot's friends are frightened off, Littlefoot quickly realizes that the baby Sharptooth is not yet dangerous, and decides to raise the newly christened "Chomper" as his parent.

This task proves difficult as Chomper is not an herbivore, and Littlefoot has no experience raising a child. Ozzy and Strut appear to exact revenge on the group for foiling their earlier theft, but are driven away by Chomper's enlarged shadow, which they mistake for that of an adult Sharptooth. The rest of the gang meets Chomper and they accept him as part of the group until he hungrily bites Cera by accident. The group's knee-jerk reaction causes Chomper to run off in tears. The others follow him to a smoking mountain, where Ozzy and Strut attempt once more to attack the children, but are stopped when the mountain's eruption sends them plummeting down a canyon. After the group escapes, they encounter two adult Sharpteeth, who have managed to enter the Valley through the opening in the Great Wall. The whole Great Valley population drives the Sharpteeth off, and the children make it back to their families, but Chomper feels left out and runs away again.

The adults inquire as to how the Sharpteeth entered the Valley, prompting the children to explain the events that resulted in the landslide. The adults set off to put together a plan to close the opening for good, telling the children to stay behind. Littlefoot runs to the forest to find Chomper. After finding him, they are chased and cornered by the two Sharpteeth. Chomper roars at them, and they recognize him as their son and leave with him. Littlefoot is then kidnapped by Ozzy and Strut, who plan to throw him off the Great Wall. Chomper hears Littlefoot screaming and leads his parents to Littlefoot's location.

Chomper's parents rescue Chomper from an attempted intervention, and inadvertently do the same thing for Littlefoot by chasing Ozzy and Strut back into the Mysterious Beyond. Littlefoot bids Chomper farewell as he follows his parents, and he returns to the Valley to assist the adults in sealing up the entrance between the Valley and the Mysterious Beyond. Following his experiences, Littlefoot tells his grandparents that being young is not so bad after all, but decides he still looks forward to growing up.

== Voice cast ==
- Scott McAfee as Littlefoot
- Candace Hutson as Cera. Hutson was the sole cast member to reprise her role from the original film.
- Heather Hogan as Ducky
- Jeff Bennett as Petrie / Ozzy
- Rob Paulsen as Spike / Strut / Chomper
- Kenneth Mars as Grandpa Longneck
- Linda Gary as Grandma Longneck
- Tress MacNeille as Petrie's Mother / Ducky's Mother / Maiasaura
- John Ingle as Narrator / Topsy

== Production ==
By July 1993, Universal Cartoon Studios began the production on a direct-to-video sequel to The Land Before Time; a release date was not set at that time.

=== Music ===
This was the film that introduced the musical format to the series and every subsequent film has followed this style ever since. Even though the film features an original score by Michael Tavera, it contains musical cues from James Horner's score of the original film. Tavera has been the main music composer for the sequels ever since.

All tracks are written by The Roches.

No.	Title	Performer(s)	Length
1.	"Peaceful Valley"	Scott McAfee, Candace Hutson, Heather Hogan & Jeff Bennett
2.	"Eggs"	Jeff Bennett & Rob Paulsen
3.	"You're One of Us Now"	Scott McAfee, Candace Hutson, Heather Hogan & Jeff Bennett
4.	"Peaceful Valley (Reprise)"	Scott McAfee, Candace Hutson, Heather Hogan & Jeff Bennett

== Release ==
In the United States, the film was originally released on LaserDisc on December 23, 1994, for retail availability – and on VHS three days later (which was the 26 of that same month and year) for national-availability advertising.

== Reception ==
In 2011, Total Film ranked it as 7th among the "50 Worst Kids Movies". In August 2014, the New York Post ranked each of the 13 Land Before Time films released up to that point and placed The Great Valley Adventure at number 5. The New York Post wrote that out of each film, The Great Valley Adventure "does the best job of maintaining some of the darker tone of the original movie while broadening its humor for younger audiences. But it's also responsible for introducing the musical format, so, boo". The film received a nomination for "Best Animated Video Production" at the 23rd Annie Awards in 1995, losing to The Gate to the Mind's Eye.

Award	Date	Nomination	Nominee	Result
Annie Award	November 11, 1995	Best Animated Video Production	The Land Before Time II	Nominated

== See also ==
- List of films featuring dinosaurs
