= Scott McAfee =

American actor

- Born: Los Angeles, California, U.S.
- Occupation: Actor
- Years active: 1987–2006
- Relatives: Anndi McAfee (sister)

Scott McAfee is an American former actor known as the second voice of Littlefoot in The Land Before Time franchise. He is the younger brother of Anndi McAfee, who is the current voice of The Land Before Time character Cera.

== Filmography ==
=== Television ===
Year	Title	Role	Notes
1992	Her Final Fury: Betty Broderick, the Last Chapter	Todd Wells	Television film
1993	Home Free	Lucas Bailey	13 episodes
1993	Lois & Clark: The New Adventures of Superman	Phillip Manning	Episode: "Smart Kids"
1994	Batman: The Animated Series	Chris Carlyle (voice)	Episode: "House and Garden"
1994–1995	Bump in the Night	Boy (voice)	6 episodes
1995	Animaniacs	Scooter (voice)	Episode: "The Kid in the Lid"
1995	Freakazoid!	Louis (voice)	Episode: "Fatman and Boy Blubber"
1999	Batman Beyond	Willie Watt (voice)	2 episodes

=== Film ===
Year	Title	Role	Notes
1988	Midnight Run	Boy on Plane	
1994	The Land Before Time II: The Great Valley Adventure	Littlefoot (voice)	Direct-to-video
1995	The Land Before Time III: The Time of the Great Giving	Littlefoot (voice)	Direct-to-video
1995	Toy Story	Kid (voice)	
1996	The Oz Kids series	Scarecrow Jr. (voice)	Direct-to-video
1996	The Land Before Time IV: Journey Through the Mists	Littlefoot (voice)	Direct-to-video

== Recognition ==
In 1994, McAfee was nominated for a Young Artist Award for "Best Youth Actor in a Voiceover Role - TV or Movie" for his work in Batman: The Animated Series and Best Youth Actor Leading Role in a Television Series for his 1993 work in Home Free.
