= Charles Grosvenor =

American animator

- Born: New Jersey, U.S.
- Education: CalArts
- Occupations: Animator, storyboard artist, director, producer
- Years active: 1978–present

Charles Grosvenor is an American animator, storyboard artist, film director, and television producer.

== Early work ==
Originally from Hillsdale, New Jersey, he moved to Los Angeles in 1978 to work in the animation industry, at a time when most of the work was still being done in the US. His first job was for Hanna-Barbera, as a model designer on The Buford Files. He soon joined the layout department and quickly advanced to crew chief, and ultimately to head of layout, thereby having a hand in every Hanna-Barbera show that was produced in those years, including Richie Rich, The Smurfs and Pac-Man.

== Evolving into direction ==
With Yogi's Treasure Hunt, Grosvenor made the move to directing. His success at that effort led to more directing assignments, including some of the first long form (an hour or more) animated shows, beginning with The Good, the Bad, and Huckleberry Hound. He graduated to feature film directing with Hanna-Barbera's Once Upon a Forest.

== Current work ==
When Hanna-Barbera was absorbed by Warner Bros., Grosvenor moved to MGM, where he directed yet another incarnation of The Pink Panther as well as an animated feature based on Babes in Toyland. In 1997, he joined Universal Cartoon Studios (later renamed Universal Animation Studios), taking over the highly successful The Land Before Time direct-to-video series, beginning with The Land Before Time V: The Mysterious Island. As of 2006 he has produced and directed an additional seven sequels (The Land Before Time VII: The Stone of Cold Fire, The Land Before Time VIII: The Big Freeze, The Land Before Time IX: Journey to Big Water, The Land Before Time X: The Great Longneck Migration, The Land Before Time XI: Invasion of the Tinysauruses, and The Land Before Time XII: The Great Day of the Flyers), in addition to overseeing 26 half-hours of a television series based on the movies. While critical reception of the series has varied (many of the first sequels received lukewarm to negative reviews, while the latter sequels received more positive reviews), the series has gained a loyal fanbase.

== Filmography ==
=== Television series ===
Year	Title	Notes
1978–1979	Godzilla	layout artist
1980	The Richie Rich/Scooby-Doo Show	layout artist/character designer
1981–1986	The Smurfs	layout artist/story director/associate producer
1981	The Kwicky Koala Show	layout artist
1982	Pac-Man	layout artist
1983	The Dukes	layout supervisor
1983	The New Scooby and Scrappy-Doo Show	layout supervisor
1985	The 13 Ghosts of Scooby-Doo	layout supervisor
1985	Galtar and the Golden Lance	layout supervisor
1985	The Jetsons	layout supervisor
1985	Snorks	layout supervisor
1985–1986	Paw Paws	layout supervisor
1987	Yogi's Treasure Hunt	producer (season 3)
1987	Popeye and Son	story director/key layout artist/producer
1989	Fantastic Max	storyboard artist/producer
1989	The Further Adventures of SuperTed	storyboard artist/producer
1994	Animaniacs	storyboard artist
1994	Beavis and Butt-Head	storyboard artist
1995	The Pink Panther	director/producer
1998	Mad Jack the Pirate	storyboard artist/layout designer
2000	Capertown Cops	storyboard artist
2005	Krypto the Superdog	storyboard artist
2006–2008	Shaggy & Scooby-Doo Get a Clue!	storyboard artist
2007–2008	The Land Before Time	producer
2009	Curious George	storyboard artist
2009	Angelina Ballerina: The Next Steps	storyboard artist
2009	The Secret Saturdays	storyboard artist
2010–2011	Bob the Builder	storyboard artist
2012–2013	Peter Rabbit	storyboard artist
2012–2020	Doc McStuffins	storyboard artist
2013	Henry Hugglemonster	storyboard artist

=== Film ===
Year	Title	Notes
1993	Once Upon a Forest	Director/Storyboard Artist
1997	Babes in Toyland	director
1997	The Land Before Time V: The Mysterious Island	director/producer
1998	The Land Before Time VI: The Secret of Saurus Rock	director/producer
2000	The Land Before Time VII: The Stone of Cold Fire	director/producer
2001	The Land Before Time VIII: The Big Freeze	director/producer
2002	The Land Before Time IX: Journey to Big Water	director/producer
2003	The Land Before Time X: The Great Longneck Migration	director/producer
2005	The Land Before Time XI: Invasion of the Tinysauruses	director/producer
2006	The Land Before Time XII: The Great Day of the Flyers	director/producer
2007	The Land Before Time XIII: The Wisdom of Friends	producer
