= Roy Allen Smith =

American animator

- Born: Roy Allen Smith; December 12, 1954 (age 71); Cedar City, Utah, U.S.
- Occupations: Animator, film director and producer
- Years active: 1990—2007

Roy Allen Smith (born December 12, 1954, in Cedar City, Utah) is an American animator, film director and producer, who is well known for the Land Before Time series and Family Guy.

== Filmography ==
=== Film ===
Year	Film	Director	Producer
1994	The Land Before Time II: The Great Valley Adventure	☒	☒
1995	The Land Before Time III: The Time of the Great Giving	☒	☒
1996	The Land Before Time IV: Journey Through the Mists	☒	☒
2003–2005	LeapFrog Learning Videos	☒	
2007	Mosaic	☒	
2007	LeapFrog Presents A Tad of Christmas Cheer	☒	

=== Television ===
Year	TV show	Episode title	Director	Producer
1990–1991	Muppet Babies	Various		☒
1992–1993	The Ren & Stimpy Show	Various		☒
1995–1996	Earthworm Jim	Various		☒
1997–1998	Silver Surfer		☒	☒
1999	Family Guy	"Mind Over Murder"	☒	
