= Whit Hertford =

American actor

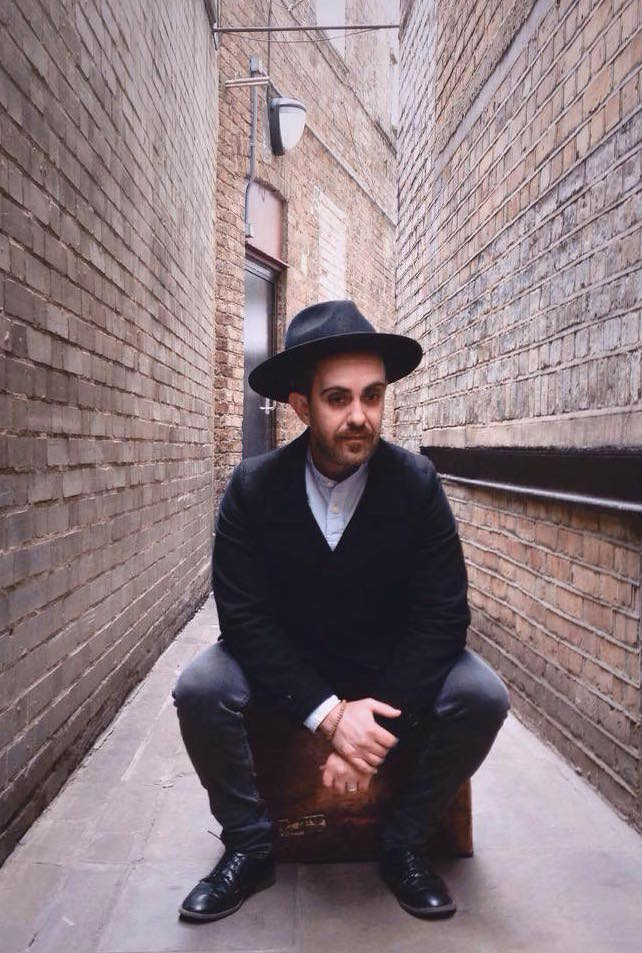
- Hertford in East London, England
- Occupations: Theatre director; writer; actor
- Years active: 1984–present

Whit Hertford is an American theatre director, writer, and actor.

== Film and television ==
Hertford began his career at an early age, most notably with his appearance in Steven Spielberg's Jurassic Park. In 2009 and 2010, he recurred as Ross on the FOX comedy Raising Hope and as the tyrannical rival choreographer Dakota Stanley during the first season of Glee. Other TV credits include Psych, various appearances on Conan and as the voice of Cadet Kryze in Star Wars: The Clone Wars.

In 2009, Hertford co-founded the independent film company Sneak Attack with director Ryan Darst. Their American New Wave short and full-length films (written by Hertford) have screened at festivals in the US and Europe, including the premiere of the revenge short film Wildlife at the Cannes Film Festival (2015) in the "Short Film Corner", which is not affiliated with the Festival de Cannes Official Short Film Competition or with the main Cannes Film Festival. The "Short Film Corner" film market screens all entries that pay the required entry fee. The production was shot all on location in rural Utah with co-stars Jon Heder and Lauren Lapkus. It was scored by Joshua James.

== Theatre ==
He is the artistic director of the theatre company Riot Act, founded in the UK in 2015.

== Filmography ==
=== Television ===
Year	Title	Role	Notes
1986	The Twilight Zone	Young Boy	Episode: "To See the Invisible Man"
1986	Second Serve	Richard, young Renee	Television film
1987	In Self Defense	Evan	Television film
1987	Home Fires	Will Ash	Television film
1988	Cagney & Lacey	Bobby Gorvel	Episode: "Hello Goodbye"
1988	Side by Side	Newsboy	Television film
1988	Family Man	Josh Tobin	7 episodes
1989	Mr. Belvedere	James Montgomery	Episode: "Stakeout"
1989–1990	Full House	Walter Berman	3 episodes
1989–1991	Empty Nest	Timmy, Alec	2 episodes
1989–1992	McGee and Me!	Phillip Monroe Jr.	3 episodes
1990	The Munsters Today	Kid Grandpa	Episode: "Misadventures in Time"
1990	Midnight Patrol: Adventures in the Dream Zone	Nick (voice)	Main voice cast (13 episodes)
1990–1991	Fox's Peter Pan & the Pirates	Michael Darling (voice)	Main voice cast
1990–1991	TaleSpin	Ernie (voice)	2 episodes
1990–1992	Tiny Toon Adventures	Duncan Duff, Fliorello (voice)	4 episodes
1992–1994	The Little Mermaid	Ollie, Crab Scout, young King Triton (voice)	3 episodes
1993	Civil Wars	Boy	Episode: "Captain Kangaroo Court"
1993	2 Stupid Dogs	Buzz (voice)	3 episodes
1994	Batman: The Animated Series	Billy (voice)	Episode: "Sideshow"
1995	The Ben Stiller Show	Kreepee Kid	Episode: "ZooTV at Night"
1996	Minor Adjustments	Rocky Demond	3 episodes
2000	Mad TV	Billy	1 episode
2009	Glee	Dakota Stanley	Episode: "Acafellas"
2009	How I Met Your Mother	Robot	Episode: "The Rough Patch"
2010	The Tonight Show Starring Johnny Carson	Passenger	1 episode
2010–2013	Star Wars: The Clone Wars	Korkie Kryze, Mandalorian Commander (voice)	2 episodes
2011	Glory Daze	Leprechaun	Episode: "Shamrock You Like A Hurricane"
2011	Psych	Donald	Episode: "Last Night Gus"
2011	Mad	Scott Pilgrim (voice)	Episode: "Snott Pilgrim vs. the Wonderful World of Disney"
2011–2013	Raising Hope	Officer Ross	3 episodes

=== Film ===
Year	Title	Role	Notes
1986	Poltergeist II: The Other Side	Kane's People	
1987	Rampage	Andrew Tippetts	
1988	Beaches	Tom	Uncredited
1989	A Nightmare on Elm Street 5: The Dream Child	Jacob Johnson	
1990	Taking Care of Business	Yuppie Son	
1991	The Addams Family	Little Tully	
1992	Mikey	Ben Owens	
1993	Jurassic Park	Volunteer Boy	
1994	My Summer Story	Lug Ditka	
1995	The Land Before Time III: The Time of the Great Giving	Hyp (voice)	Direct-to-video
2007	The Pink Conspiracy	Nursey	
2007	Moving McAllister	Fast Food Cashier	
2008	Break	Lawyer	
2008	Dark Reel	Chef	
2008	Gerald	Funeral Director	
2010	Long Story Short	Fisher	Short film; also writer and producer
2011	Hit List	Phil	
2011	Elliott	Graham	Short film; also writer and producer
2012	Dreamworld	Oliver Hayes	Also writer and producer
2012	Peter at the End	Harrison	Short film; also writer and producer
2012	Tomorrow	Miles	Short film; also writer and producer
2013	The Caper Kind	Rascal Woods	Short film; also writer, director, and producer
2013	Midway	Otis Alabaster	Short film; also writer and producer
2014	The Perfect 46	Jesse Darden	Also producer
2014	Wildlife	Possum Mutz	Short film; also writer and producer
2016	Prettyface	Charlie Manson	

=== Miscellaneous ===
Year	Title	Role	Notes
1985	Lay It Down	Child at Birthday Party	Music video
