= Aria Curzon =

American actress

- Occupation: Actress
- Years active: 1995–present

Aria Curzon is an American actress. She voiced the roles Ducky in The Land Before Time franchise, Teresa ("The Cornchip Girl") in Recess, and Mandy Straussberg in the radio drama Adventures in Odyssey.

== Life and career ==
Curzon has guest starred on Gigantic, Without A Trace, JAG, The Pretender, and Sabrina, the Teenage Witch. Her credits include Treehouse Hostage (with Jim Varney) and Santa With Muscles, starring Hulk Hogan, Adam Wylie, and Mila Kunis, and the 2011 film The Muppets.

Curzon has performed voiceover work in The Land Before Time film series. She is a regular in the animated series The Land Before Time which premiered in March 2007. Other voiceover work includes radio and TV commercials.

== Filmography ==
=== Television ===
| Year | Title | Role | Notes |
|---|---|---|---|
| 1995 | America's Most Wanted | Wendy | Episode: "The Daniel Brewster Story" |
| 1997 | Cave Kids | Pebbles Flintstone (voice) | 8 episodes |
| 1997 | Nightmare Ned | Joanie (voice) | 2 episodes |
| 1997 | Superman: The Animated Series | Young Lucy Lane (voice) | Episode: "Monkey Fun" |
| 1998–2001 | Recess | Theresa LaMaise / Cornchip Girl (voice) | 20 episodes |
| 1999–2002 | Oh Yeah! Cartoons | Various voices | 4 episodes |
| 2001–2003 | Stanley | Ben (voice) | 2 episodes |
| 2007 | The Land Before Time | Ducky / Tickly Fuzzy Girl (voice) | 26 episodes |

=== Film ===
| Year | Title | Role | Notes |
|---|---|---|---|
| 1996 | Santa with Muscles | Elizabeth | Direct-to-video |
| 1997 | Annabelle's Wish | Emily (voice) | Direct-to-video |
| 1997 | The Land Before Time V: The Mysterious Island | Ducky (voice) | Direct-to-video |
| 1998 | The Land Before Time VI: The Secret of Saurus Rock | Ducky (voice) | Direct-to-video |
| 1998 | I'm Losing You | Tiffany Krohn | |
| 1998 | The Prince of Egypt | Jethrodiadah (voice) | Uncredited |
| 1998 | Treehouse Hostage | Janie Paulson | |
| 2000 | The Land Before Time VII: The Stone of Cold Fire | Ducky (voice) | Direct-to-video |
| 2001 | The Land Before Time VIII: The Big Freeze | Ducky (voice) | Direct-to-video |
| 2002 | The Land Before Time IX: Journey to Big Water | Ducky (voice) | Direct-to-video |
| 2003 | The Land Before Time X: The Great Longneck Migration | Ducky (voice) | Direct-to-video |
| 2005 | The Land Before Time XI: Invasion of the Tinysauruses | Ducky (voice) | Direct-to-video |
| 2006 | The Land Before Time XII: The Great Day of the Flyers | Ducky (voice) | Direct-to-video |
| 2007 | The Land Before Time XIII: The Wisdom of Friends | Ducky (voice) | Direct-to-video |
| 2011 | The Muppets | Marge | |
| 2016 | The Land Before Time XIV: Journey of the Brave | Ducky, Diggers (voice) | Direct-to-video |
