= DVD Exclusive Awards =

Former awards ceremony

The DVD Exclusive Awards were an awards program that honored direct to video productions released on DVD. From 2001 to 2006, honorees were selected and the awards were presented by periodical DVD Exclusive, a sister publication of Variety and Video Business, and The Digital Entertainment Group (DEG). When the magazine ceased publication, the program was discontinued.
