= Amanda McBroom =

American singer-songwriter and actress

- Born: August 9, 1947 (age 79)
- Occupations: Singer-songwriter, actress
- Spouse: George Ball (1974-present)

Amanda McBroom (born August 9, 1947) is an American singer-songwriter and actress. Notable among the songs she has written is "The Rose", which Bette Midler sang in the film of the same name, and which has been sung by many other recording artists. McBroom is also known for her collaborations as lyricist with songwriter Michele Brourman, writing lyrics for 14 animated films including some of the songs in The Land Before Time film series, Balto II: Wolf Quest, and the musical Dangerous Beauty based on the film of the same name, which had its world premiere at the Pasadena Playhouse on February 13, 2011.

McBroom starred in the New York City, Los Angeles, San Francisco, and European productions of Jacques Brel Is Alive and Well and Living in Paris, and she made her Broadway debut in the Cy Coleman and Dorothy Fields musical Seesaw.

As an actress, McBroom has had guest-starring or recurring roles on such television series as Starsky & Hutch, Star Trek: The Next Generation, Hart to Hart, Taxi, Charlie's Angels, Remington Steele, Hawaii Five-O, Magnum, P.I., M*A*S*H, Lou Grant, Gunsmoke, Dance Your Pants Off! and Love, American Style. She has also worked as a voice actress for children's cartoon shows, including Wildfire, The Fonz and the Happy Days Gang, Challenge of the GoBots, The Smurfs, and The Richie Rich/Scooby-Doo Show.

In 2016, she raised more than $43,000 in a Kickstarter campaign for her album Voices, which was released in 2017.
