= Judy Freudberg =

American screenwriter (1949–2012)

- Born: Judith Freudberg; July 12, 1949; Memphis, Tennessee, U.S.
- Died: June 10, 2012 (aged 62); Manhattan, New York, U.S.
- Education: Syracuse University (BA)
- Occupation: Television writer
- Years active: 1971–2010

Judith Freudberg (July 12, 1949 – June 10, 2012) was an American TV and film writer. She was born in Memphis, Tennessee, and graduated from Syracuse University with a degree in speech and dramatic arts. Freudberg identified as gay.

In 1971, she started working on Sesame Street, two years after the show's debut, as an assistant in the music department and became a writer for the children's television show in 1975. Freudberg worked on the show for 35 years and shared 17 daytime Emmys. One of the creators and developers of Elmo's World, she served as head writer for the popular segment.

Freudberg collaborated with Tony Geiss on Sesame Street's first feature film, Sesame Street Presents: Follow That Bird (1985) as well as An American Tail (1986) and The Land Before Time (1988), two feature animated films directed by Don Bluth and executive produced by Steven Spielberg. She and Molly Boylan were nominated for a Daytime Emmy for Outstanding Writing in a Children's Special for the home video Elmo's World: Wild Wild West (2001). For Sesame Street season 35, Freudberg co-wrote, with Lou Berger, the primetime special, Sesame Street Presents: The Street We Live On (2004), which was nominated for an Emmy as Outstanding Children's Program. She also wrote for Sesame Workshop's comedy series The Upside Down Show.

Freudberg died on June 10, 2012, in Manhattan at age 62 from complications of a brain tumor.
