= Tony Geiss =

American film producer

- Born: Nicholas Anthony Geiss; November 16, 1924; Manhattan, New York City, U.S.
- Died: January 21, 2011 (aged 86); Manhattan, New York City, U.S.
- Education: Cornell University
- Occupations: Producer; screenwriter; songwriter; lyricist; author
- Years active: 1967–2009
- Spouse: Phyllis Eisen (d. 2010)

Nicholas Anthony "Tony" Geiss (November 16, 1924 – January 21, 2011) was an American producer, screenwriter, songwriter, lyricist and author, known principally for his children's work. During his time at Sesame Street, he often collaborated with Judy Freudberg and co-created Elmo's World with her. He co-wrote the animated film An American Tail (1986) and co-created The Land Before Time franchise. Geiss won 17 Daytime Emmy Awards and was nominated for a Primetime Emmy Award in 1984.

== Biography ==
Geiss was born in Manhattan to Jewish immigrants Alexander "Alec" Geiss (1896–1974) and Doris Marjorie Thirer (1899–1980). He grew up in Greenwich Village, where he was exposed to the arts and entertainment. His father, who was born in Kropyvnytskyi, Ukraine, was a painter and animator, best known for his work at Columbia' Screen Gems studio. His mother, a press agent, was born in England of Romanian and Polish descent, and helped promote American interest in foreign films after World War II.

Geiss served two years as a radar technician in the US Navy during WWII. He graduated from Cornell University in 1946.

Geiss wrote for The David Frost Show and for comedians including Dick Cavett and Bill Cosby.

Geiss was a staff writer and songwriter for Sesame Street and wrote for characters Elmo, Big Bird, and Kermit the Frog. He wrote Don't Eat the Pictures (1983), for which he was nominated for a Primetime Emmy Award.

Geiss was a writer for The Land Before Time (1988) and the associated book. He was also a producer and writer for the Don Bluth film An American Tail (1986).

Geiss died at the age of 86 on January 21, 2011, from complications from a neck injury caused by a fall at his home in Manhattan, New York.
