= John Ingle =

American actor (1928–2012)

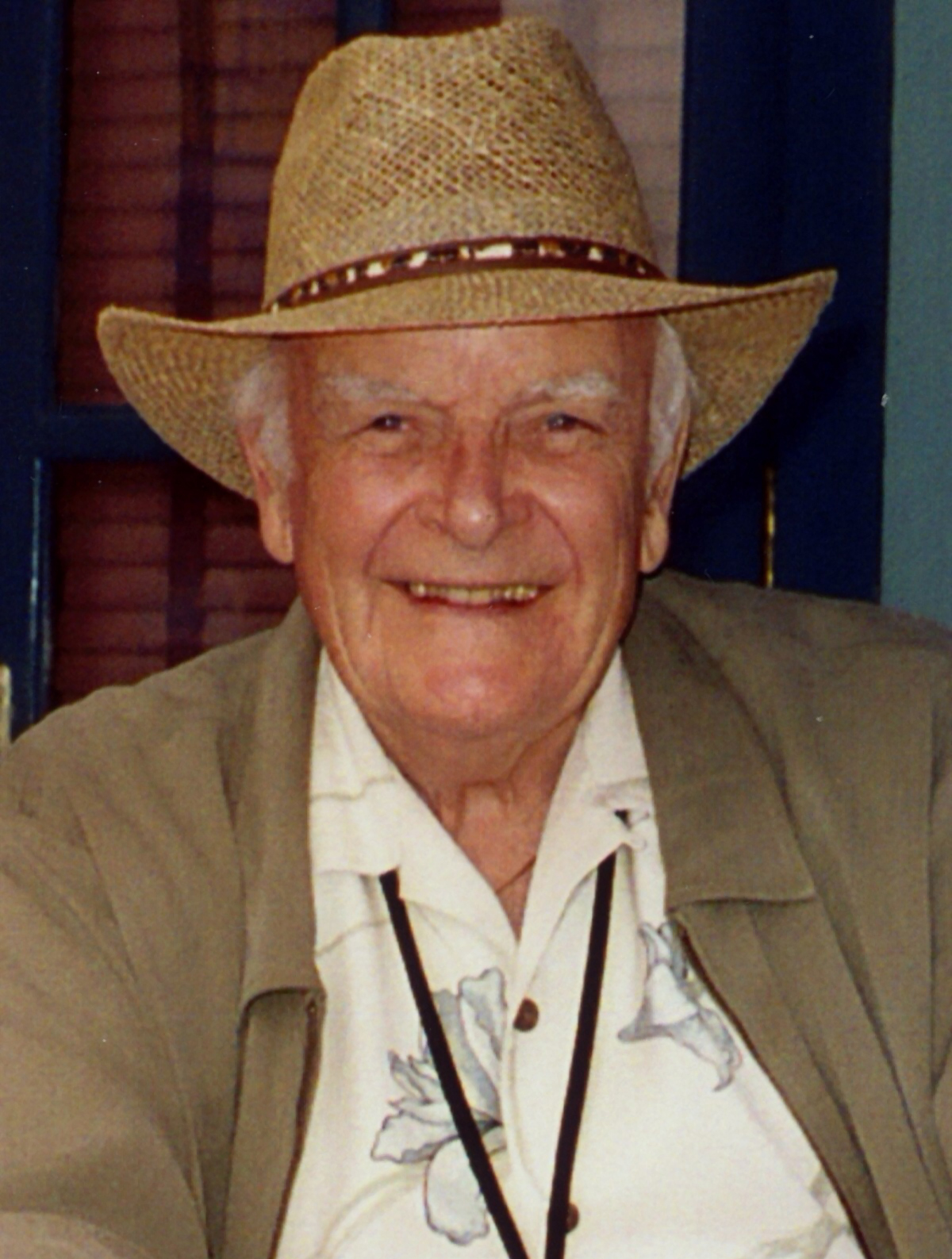
- Ingle in December 2006
- Born: John Houston Ingle; May 7, 1928; Tulsa, Oklahoma, U.S.
- Died: September 16, 2012 (aged 84); Los Angeles, California, U.S.
- Occupations: Actor; schoolteacher
- Years active: 1985–2012
- Known for: Portrayal of Edward Quartermaine; Voice of Mr. Threehorn
- Spouse: Grace-Lynne Ingle (m. 1954; died 2012)

John Houston Ingle (May 7, 1928 – September 16, 2012) was an American actor best known for his roles as scheming patriarch Edward Quartermaine in the ABC soap opera General Hospital and Mr. Threehorn, the father of the main character Cera in the Land Before Time.

== Career ==
A retired high school drama teacher, Ingle began mainstream acting in 1985 doing various guest appearances; one of his first cinema appearances was a performance of the song "Puzzling Evidence" in the 1986 David Byrne musical, True Stories (his recording of the song would not be released until 2018). In 1993, he took over the role of Edward Quartermaine in General Hospital. He had appeared on "General Hospital" in the late 1980s as a W.S.B. associate of Anna Devane.

In December 2003, Ingle was fired and Edward was to be killed off. Without a contract to keep him at General Hospital, Ingle was free to court other offers and accepted the contract role of Mickey Horton, as a recast for the retiring John Clarke, on the soap opera, Days of Our Lives. Ingle left General Hospital in February 2004 and Edward was recast with Jed Allan.

Once at Days of our Lives, Ingle became part of a love triangle story involving Bonnie (Judi Evans Luciano) and Maggie (Suzanne Rogers). Ingle had recurring roles in HBO's Big Love, The Drew Carey Show, and the long-running The Land Before Time.

Ingle played "Wise Paw" in the 21-episode 1985 syndicated series Paw Paws, a segment of the animated block The Funtastic World of Hanna-Barbera.

Ingle returned to General Hospital as Edward Quartermaine, being re-hired after public complaints about Ingle's mistreatment by the producers, on a recurring basis, starting in April 2006.

== Personal life ==
John Houston Ingle was born in Tulsa, Oklahoma. He graduated from Verdugo Hills High School in Tujunga, Los Angeles, California. He graduated from Occidental College in Los Angeles. He began teaching English and theater in 1955 at Hollywood High School until transferring in 1964 to teach drama at Beverly Hills High School in Beverly Hills, California, until his retirement in 1985. His pupils included Nicolas Cage, Albert Brooks, Richard Dreyfuss, Joanna Gleason, Barbara Hershey, Swoosie Kurtz, Stefanie Powers, David Schwimmer, Jonathan Silverman, Louise Sorel and Julie Kavner. He called former General Hospital actor Stuart Damon his "closest friend". Ingle, along with actress Leslie Charleson, fought Damon's 2007 dismissal from the show.

== Health ==
In late 2008, Ingle underwent treatment for a small section of melanoma on his scalp. He was forced to wear a hat while onscreen to cover the bandage. Ingle was an active volunteer with Habitat for Humanity.

== Family and death ==
Ingle married Grace-Lynne Martin in 1954. They had five daughters. Grace-Lynne Ingle died on February 11, 2012. Ingle died seven months later on September 16, aged 84, after battling cancer.

== Selected filmography ==
=== Films ===
- 1985 Stitches as Dr. Clayton Fowler
- 1986 True Stories as The Preacher
- 1987 Amazon Women on the Moon as Felix Van Dam (segment "Art Sale")
- 1988 Defense Play as Senator
- 1988 Heathers as Principal Gowan
- 1990 RoboCop 2 as Surgeon General
- 1990 Repossessed as Father Crosby (as John H. Ingle)
- 1991 For Parents Only as Dr. Carlisle
- 1992 Stepfather III as Father Ernest Thomas Brennan
- 1992 Death Becomes Her as Eulogist
- 1993 Suture as Sidney Callahan
- 1993 Skeeter as The Preacher
- 1993 King B: A Life in the Movies as Robert Kurtzman
- 1994-2007 The Land Before Time as Topsy, Cera's Dad / Narrator (voice)
- 1997 Batman & Robin as Doctor
- 1998 Senseless as Economics Professor
- 2005 Hostage as Gray Hair Man
- 2009 Timer as Dutch
- 2010 Mean Parents Suck as Dr. Carlisle

=== Television ===
- 1985 Cheers - episode "The Groom Wore Clearasil" as Professor Moffat
- 1986 Gimme a Break! - episode "Pride and Prejudice" as Mr. Randall
- 1986 Beverly Hills Madam - (television movie) as Law Professor
- 1987 Mama's Family - episode "Educating Mama" as Mr. Tucker
- 1989 The Golden Girls - episode "Dancing in the Dark" as Harv
- 1989–1991 Night Court as Theodore Wood / Mr. Kitteridge
- 1992 Beverly Hills, 90210 as Dickson St.Clair
- 1993–2012 General Hospital as Edward Quartermaine (#2) (final television appearance)
- 1999 Boy Meets World - episode "The Honeymooners" as Mr. Frank Nelson
- 2004–2006 Days of Our Lives as Mickey Horton (#3)
- 2007: The Office (US) - Episode: "Dunder Mifflin Infinity" as Robert Dunder
- 2007–2008 The Land Before Time as Topsy, Cera's Dad (voice)
