= Drew Barrymore filmography =

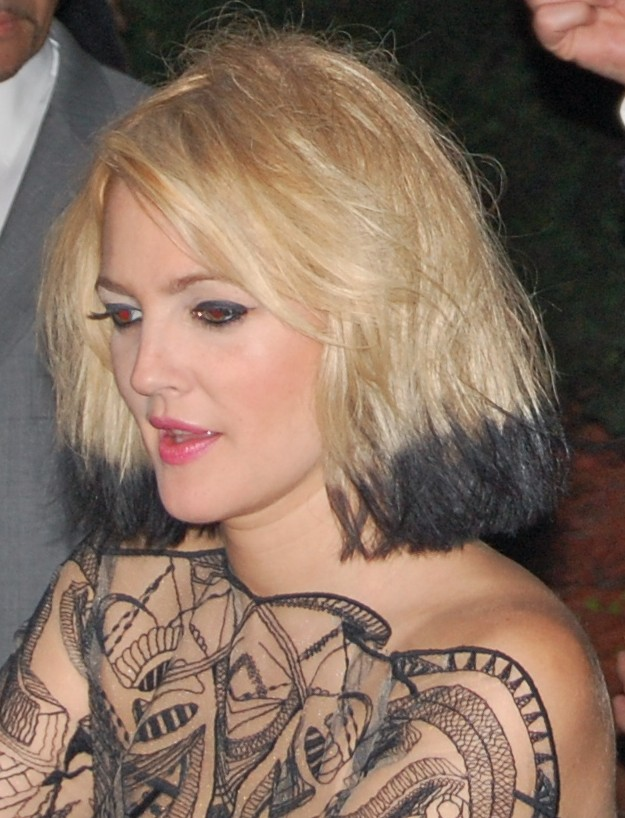
Barrymore at the 2009 premiere of Whip It

Drew Barrymore is an American actress and producer. She is the recipient of numerous accolades, including a Golden Globe and a Screen Actors Guild Award, as well as seven Emmy Award nominations and a BAFTA nomination. She achieved fame as a child actress with her role in E.T. the Extra-Terrestrial. Following a highly publicized childhood marked by drug and alcohol abuse, she released an autobiography Little Girl Lost. She appeared in several successful films, such as Charlie's Angels, Never Been Kissed, Poison Ivy, Boys on the Side, Mad Love, Batman Forever, Scream, and Ever After. She starred with Adam Sandler in the films, The Wedding Singer, 50 First Dates, and Blended. Other films included Firestarter, Never Been Kissed, Donnie Darko, Riding in Cars with Boys, Confessions of a Dangerous Mind, Charlie's Angels: Full Throttle, Fever Pitch, Music and Lyrics, Going the Distance, Big Miracle, and Miss You Already. She also starred in her directorial debut film Whip It. She won a SAG Award and a Golden Globe for her role in Grey Gardens. She starred in the Netflix series Santa Clarita Diet and currently hosts the syndicated talk show The Drew Barrymore Show.

== Filmography ==
=== Film ===
Year	Title	Role	Notes
1980	Altered States	Margaret Jessup	
1982	E.T. the Extra-Terrestrial	Gertie Taylor	
1984	Firestarter	Charlie McGee	
1984	Irreconcilable Differences	Casey Brodsky	
1985	Cat's Eye	Our Girl / Amanda	
1989	See You in the Morning	Cathy Goodwin	
1989	Far from Home	Joleen Cox	
1991	Motorama	Fantasy Girl	Cameo
1992	Poison Ivy	Ivy	
1992	Waxwork II: Lost in Time	Vampire Victim #1	Cameo
1992	Guncrazy	Anita Minteer	
1993	No Place to Hide	Tinsel Hanley	
1993	Doppelganger	Holly Gooding	
1993	Wayne's World 2	Bjergen Kjergen	
1994	Bad Girls	Lilly Laronette	
1994	Inside the Goldmine	Daisy	Cameo
1995	Boys on the Side	Holly Pulchik	
1995	Mad Love	Casey Roberts	
1995	Batman Forever	Sugar	
1996	Everyone Says I Love You	Skylar Dandridge	
1996	Scream	Casey Becker	
1997	Best Men	Hope	
1997	Wishful Thinking	Lena	
1998	The Wedding Singer	Julia Sullivan	
1998	Ever After	Danielle de Barbarac	
1998	Home Fries	Sally Jackson	
1999	Never Been Kissed	Josie Geller	
2000	Skipped Parts	Fantasy Girl	
2000	Titan A.E.	Akima Kunimoto	Voice
2000	Charlie's Angels	Dylan Sanders	
2001	Donnie Darko	Karen Pomeroy	
2001	Freddy Got Fingered	Davidson's Receptionist	Cameo
2001	Riding in Cars with Boys	Beverly "Bev" Donofrio	
2002	Confessions of a Dangerous Mind	Penny Pacino	
2003	Charlie's Angels: Full Throttle	Dylan Sanders / Helen Zaas	
2003	Duplex	Nancy Kendricks	
2004	50 First Dates	Lucy Whitmore	
2005	Fever Pitch	Lindsey Meeks	
2005	Stewie Griffin: The Untold Story	Herself	Voice; Direct-to-video
2006	Curious George	Maggie Dunlop	Voice
2007	Music and Lyrics	Sophie Fisher	
2007	Lucky You	Billie Offer	
2008	Beverly Hills Chihuahua	Chloe	Voice
2009	He's Just Not That Into You	Mary Harris	
2009	Everybody's Fine	Rosie Goode	
2009	Whip It	Smashley Simpson	
2010	Going the Distance	Erin Langford	
2012	Big Miracle	Rachel Kramer	
2014	Blended	Lauren Reynolds	
2015	Miss You Already	Jess	
2020	The Stand In	Paula / Candy Black	
2021	A Castle for Christmas	Herself	Cameo
2023	Jackpot	Herself	Short film; Cameo
2024	Child Star	Herself	Documentary
2024	Smile 2	Herself	Cameo
2026	Influenced	Herself	
2026	Outcome	Herself	

=== Television ===
Year	Title	Role	Notes
1982–2009	Saturday Night Live	Herself / host	6 episodes
1985	ABC Weekend Specials	Con Sawyer	Episode: "The Adventures of Con Sawyer and Hucklemary Finn"
1985	Star Fairies	Hilary	Voice, television film
1986	The Ray Bradbury Theatre	Heather Leary	Episode: "The Screaming Woman"
1986	Babes in Toyland	Lisa Piper	Television film
1987	Conspiracy of Love	Jody Woldarski	Television film
1989	CBS Schoolbreak Special	Susan	Episode: "15 and Getting Straight"
1992	Sketch Artist	Daisy	Television film
1992	2000 Malibu Road	Lindsay Rule	6 episodes
1993	The Amy Fisher Story	Amy Fisher	Television film
1996	Bill Nye the Science Guy	Herself	Episode: "Flowers"
1998	The Larry Sanders Show	Herself	Episode: "Putting the 'Gay' Back in Litigation"
1999	Olive, the Other Reindeer	Olive	Voice, Television film
2000, 2022	The Simpsons	Sophie, Herself	Voice, episode: "Insane Clown Poppy" and "The King of Nice"
2005–2013	Family Guy	Lana Lockhart, Jillian Russell	Voice, 12 episodes
2009	Grey Gardens	Edith Bouvier Beale	Television film
2016	Odd Mom Out	Meredith	Episode: "Knock of Shame"
2017–2019	Santa Clarita Diet	Sheila Hammond	30 episodes
2017	First Dates	Narrator	Voice
2018	The Daily Show	Investor	Episode: "Rosie Perez"
2019	The World's Best	Herself	Judge
2020	Beat Bobby Flay	Herself	Judge
2020	Martha Knows Best	Herself	Episode: "Winter Is Coming"
2020–present	The Drew Barrymore Show	Herself / Josie Geller / Casey Becker	Creator
2022	Ziwe	Herself	Episode: "Miss Universe"
2023	The Eric Andre Show	Herself	Episode: "Don't You Say a Word"
2023	And Just Like That...	Herself	Episode: "February 14th"
2024	Princess Power	Headmistress Miranda	Voice, 7 episodes
2025	Hollywood Squares	Herself	Center square, co-executive producer

=== Video games ===
Year	Title	Voice role
2003	Charlie's Angels	Dylan Sanders

=== Music videos ===
Year	Title	Artist
1986	"Rock 'n' Roll to the Rescue"	The Beach Boys
1995	"You Got It"	Bonnie Raitt
1999	"Candy in the Sun"	Swirl 360
2017	"Drew Barrymore"	SZA

=== Podcasts ===
Year	Title	Role	Notes	Ref.
2015	Wildflower	Author / Narrator	Audiobook	
2021	Rebel Homemaker: Food, Family, Life	Co-author / Narrator	Audiobook; Co-authored with Pilar Valdes	
2021	Armchair Expert with Dax Shepard	Guest	Episode: "Drew Barrymore"	
2022–present	Drew's News	Host		

=== Director ===
Year	Title	Notes
2004	Choose or Lose Presents: The Best Place to Start	Television film
2009	Whip It	Directorial debut
2011	"Our Deal" by Best Coast	Music video

=== Producer ===
Year	Title	Notes
1999	Never Been Kissed	Executive producer
2000	Charlie's Angels	
2001	Donnie Darko	Executive producer
2003	Charlie's Angels: Full Throttle	
2003	Duplex	
2005	Fever Pitch	
2009	He's Just Not That Into You	Executive producer
2009	Whip It	
2011	Charlie's Angels	Executive producer
2014	Animal	Executive producer
2016	How to Be Single	Executive producer
2017–2019	Santa Clarita Diet	Executive producer
2017	Freak Show	Executive producer
2019	Charlie's Angels	Executive producer
2020–present	The Drew Barrymore Show	Executive producer
2023–2024	Princess Power	Executive producer
