= The Land Before Time =

American animated media franchise

- Official franchise logo, as originally released by Universal Pictures in 1988
- Created by: Don Bluth; Judy Freudberg; Tony Geiss
- Original work: The Land Before Time (1988)
- Owner: Universal Pictures
- Years: 1988–2016

Films and television
- Films: List of films
- Animated series: The Land Before Time (2007–08)

Games
- Video games: List of video games

Audio
- Soundtrack: The Land Before Time

Miscellaneous
- Theme park attraction: The Land Before Time Adventure (1997–98)

Official website
- landbeforetime.com

The Land Before Time is a franchise consisting of American animated adventure films centered around dinosaurs, including a theatrical movie, various straight-to-home video sequels, and a spin-off TV series. Based on an original story by Judy Freudberg and Tony Geiss and distributed by Universal Pictures, the franchise began in 1988 with the eponymous film, directed and produced by Don Bluth and executive produced by George Lucas and Steven Spielberg.

Its success spawned thirteen direct-to-video musical sequels before expanding into other media including video games, soundtracks, and related merchandising. Notably, the additional movies and TV show did not include the collaborative participation of Bluth, Lucas, nor Spielberg.

The 14 films were released as a Complete Collection DVD set in June 2016.

== Plot ==
The films follow the friendship of a group of young reptiles (four dinosaurs and a pterosaur) named Littlefoot (a male Apatosaurus), Cera (a female Triceratops), Ducky (a female Saurolophus), Petrie (a male Pteranodon), and Spike (a male Stegosaurus). After finding the Great Valley, they raise a carnivorous baby (a male Tyrannosaurus whom they name Chomper), survive a drought, a cold snap, and witness a solar eclipse. Throughout the films they embark on adventures, learning lessons about life, teamwork, and friendship along the way.

== Films ==
=== Theatrical ===
Film	Year	Director	Screenwriter	Story by	Producer(s)
The Land Before Time	1988	Don Bluth	Stu Krieger	Judy Freudberg and Tony Geiss	Don Bluth, Gary Goldman and John Pomeroy

=== Direct-to-video ===
Film	Year	Director	Screenwriter(s)	Producer(s)
The Land Before Time II: The Great Valley Adventure	1994	Roy Allen Smith	John Loy, John Ludin and Dev Ross	Roy Allen Smith
The Land Before Time III: The Time of the Great Giving	1995	Roy Allen Smith	Dev Ross	Roy Allen Smith and Zahra Dowlatabadi
The Land Before Time IV: Journey Through the Mists	1996	Roy Allen Smith	Dev Ross	Roy Allen Smith
The Land Before Time V: The Mysterious Island	1997	Charles Grosvenor	John Loy	Charles Grosvenor
The Land Before Time VI: The Secret of Saurus Rock	1998	Charles Grosvenor	Libby Hinson and John Loy	Charles Grosvenor
The Land Before Time VII: The Stone of Cold Fire	2000	Charles Grosvenor	Len Uhley	Charles Grosvenor
The Land Before Time VIII: The Big Freeze	2001	Charles Grosvenor	John Loy	Charles Grosvenor
The Land Before Time IX: Journey to Big Water	2002	Charles Grosvenor	Dev Ross	Charles Grosvenor
The Land Before Time X: The Great Longneck Migration	2003	Charles Grosvenor	John Loy	Charles Grosvenor
The Land Before Time XI: Invasion of the Tinysauruses	2005	Charles Grosvenor	John Loy	Charles Grosvenor
The Land Before Time XII: The Great Day of the Flyers	2006	Charles Grosvenor	John Loy	Charles Grosvenor
The Land Before Time XIII: The Wisdom of Friends	2007	Jamie Mitchell	John Loy	Charles Grosvenor
The Land Before Time XIV: Journey of the Brave	2016	Davis Doi	Cliff Ruby and Elana Lesser	Lisa Melbye and Deidre Brenner

== Television series ==
Series	Season(s)	Episodes	Originally released			Showrunner	Executive producers	Status
Series	Season(s)	Episodes	First released	Last released	Network	Showrunner	Executive producers	Status
The Land Before Time	1	26	March 5, 2007	January 21, 2008	Cartoon Network	Charles Grosvenor	Charles Grosvenor and Diane A. Crea	Ended

A spin-off television series based on the films began airing on YTV in Canada on January 5, 2007. It consisted of one season of 26 episodes, and officially premiered on Cartoon Network in the United States on March 5, 2007, after the DVD release of The Land Before Time XII: The Great Day of the Flyers. The TV series takes place after the events of The Land Before Time XIII: The Wisdom of Friends. It has since been collected and released on 6 DVDs, each containing 4 episodes, in the United States and the UK. The complete series was released on DVD in 2022.

== Cast and characters ==
List indicator

This section includes characters who will appear or have appeared in more than two films in the series.

- An empty grey cell indicates the character was not in the film, or that the character's official presence has not yet been confirmed.
- ^{D} indicates an appearance as a character's disguised voice.
- ^{S} indicates an appearance as a character's singing voice.

Characters	Films														Television
Characters	The Land Before Time	The Great Valley Adventure	The Time of the Great Giving	Journey Through the Mists	The Mysterious Island	The Secret of Saurus Rock	The Stone of Cold Fire	The Big Freeze	Journey to Big Water	The Great Longneck Migration	Invasion of the Tinysauruses	The Great Day of the Flyers	The Wisdom of Friends	Journey of the Brave	The Land Before Time
Characters	1988	1994	1995	1996	1997	1998	2000	2001	2002	2003	2005	2006	2007	2016	2007–2008
Narrator	Pat Hingle	John Ingle	John Ingle	John Ingle	John Ingle			John Ingle	John Ingle	John Ingle	John Ingle	John Ingle	John Ingle	Tony Amendola	
Littlefoot	Gabriel Damon	Scott McAfee	Scott McAfee	Scott McAfee	Brandon LaCroix Thomas Dekker^{S}	Thomas Dekker	Thomas Dekker	Thomas Dekker	Thomas Dekker	Alec Medlock	Aaron Spann	Nick Price	Cody Arens Logan Arens^{D} Anthony Skillman^{S}	Felix Avitia	Cody Arens Anthony Skillman^{S}
Cera	Candace Hutson	Candace Hutson	Candace Hutson	Candace Hutson	Anndi McAfee	Anndi McAfee	Anndi McAfee	Anndi McAfee	Anndi McAfee	Anndi McAfee	Anndi McAfee	Anndi McAfee	Anndi McAfee	Anndi McAfee	Anndi McAfee
Ducky	Judith Barsi	Heather Hogan	Heather Hogan	Heather Hogan	Aria Noelle Curzon	Aria Noelle Curzon	Aria Noelle Curzon	Aria Noelle Curzon	Aria Noelle Curzon	Aria Noelle Curzon	Aria Noelle Curzon	Aria Noelle Curzon	Aria Noelle Curzon	Aria Noelle Curzon	Aria Noelle Curzon
Petrie	Will Ryan	Jeff Bennett	Jeff Bennett	Jeff Bennett	Jeff Bennett	Jeff Bennett	Jeff Bennett	Jeff Bennett	Jeff Bennett	Jeff Bennett	Jeff Bennett	Jeff Bennett	Jeff Bennett	Jeff Bennett	Jeff Bennett
Spike	N/A	Rob Paulsen	Rob Paulsen	Rob Paulsen	Rob Paulsen	Jeff Bennett	Rob Paulsen	Rob Paulsen	Rob Paulsen	Rob Paulsen	Rob Paulsen	Rob Paulsen	Rob Paulsen	Rob Paulsen	Rob Paulsen
Chomper		Rob Paulsen			Cannon Young									Issac Brown	Max Burkholder
Ruby														Meghan Strange	Meghan Strange
Grandpa Longneck	Bill Erwin (deleted role)	Kenneth Mars	Kenneth Mars	Kenneth Mars	Kenneth Mars	Kenneth Mars	Kenneth Mars	Kenneth Mars	Kenneth Mars	Kenneth Mars	Kenneth Mars	Kenneth Mars	Does not speak	Barry Bostwick	Kenneth Mars
Grandma Longneck	Does not speak	Linda Gary	Linda Gary	Linda Gary	Miriam Flynn	Miriam Flynn	Miriam Flynn	Miriam Flynn	Miriam Flynn	Miriam Flynn	Miriam Flynn	Does not speak	Miriam Flynn	Miriam Flynn	Miriam Flynn
Daddy Topps	Burke Byrnes	John Ingle	John Ingle	Does not speak	John Ingle	John Ingle	John Ingle	John Ingle	John Ingle	John Ingle	John Ingle	John Ingle	John Ingle	George Ball	John Ingle
Ducky's Mother	Does not speak	Tress MacNeille	Tress MacNeille		Tress MacNeille		Tress MacNeille	Tress MacNeille	Tress MacNeille	Does not speak	Tress MacNeille	Does not speak	Does not speak	Meghan Strange	Tress MacNeille
Petrie's Mother	Does not speak	Tress MacNeille	Tress MacNeille		Tress MacNeille	Does not speak	Tress MacNeille	Tress MacNeille	Tress MacNeille		Tress MacNeille	Tress MacNeille	Does not speak	Anndi McAfee	Tress MacNeille
Kosh			Rob Paulsen		Jeff Bennett						Rob Paulsen	Rob Paulsen			Pete Sepenuk Jeff Bennett
Littlefoot's Mother	Helen Shaver									Flashback					Flashback
Chomper's parents		N/A			N/A										
Hyp			Whit Hertford												Mikey Kelley
Nod			Scott Menville												Scott Menville
Mutt			Jeff Bennett												Jeff Bennett
Ali				Juliana Hansen											Nika Futterman
Old One				Carol Bruce											Jessica Walter
Doc						Kris Kristofferson									Jeff Bennett
Mr. Thicknose								Robert Guillaume							Dorian Harewood
Tippy								Jeremy Suarez							Cree Summer
Tippy's Mother								Susan Krebs							Susan Krebs
Stegosaurus Leader								Rob Paulsen							Rob Paulsen
Mo									Rob Paulsen	Does not speak		Rob Paulsen			Rob Paulsen
Shorty										Brandon Michael DePaul					Elizabeth Daily
Bron										Kiefer Sutherland				Scott Whyte	Cam Clarke
Tria											Camryn Manheim	Camryn Manheim	Jessica Gee		Jessica Gee
Guido												Rob Paulsen			Rob Paulsen
Tricia												Nika Futterman			Meghan Strange

== In other media ==
=== Albums ===
- The Land Before Time (1988) Original Motion Picture Soundtrack
- The Land Before Time: Sing-Along Songs (1997): Songs from the first four movies (movies I, II, III, and IV). The album was later released in a VHS format which included facts about the dinosaurs featured in the franchise.
- The Songs from The Land Before Time (1997): Songs from the first four movies (movies I-IV)
- The Land Before Time: More Sing-Along Songs (1999) Songs from movies V and VI (the last two of the first 6 movies) and An American Tail film series (movies III and IV).
- The Best Songs from The Land Before Time (2016) Songs from movies I, VI, VIII, IX, X, XI, and XIV.

=== Video games ===
The series has spawned 14 spin-off games, eight for PC, one for the Game Boy Color, two for the Game Boy Advance and three for the original PlayStation. The PC games are usually educational games aimed for preschool and kindergarten. Games for the Game Boy Color and Advance include The Land Before Time and The Land Before Time: Into the Mysterious Beyond, in which the original six characters must search for Chomper.

Games for the PlayStation include The Land Before Time: Big Water Adventure, a spin-off of Journey to Big Water, The Land Before Time: Great Valley Racing Adventure and The Land Before Time: Return to the Great Valley. All characters in these games are voiced by Lani Minella.

== Merchandise ==
By 2000, the franchise generated $1 billion in retail sales.
