= List of awards and nominations received by Drew Barrymore =

Drew Barrymore awards
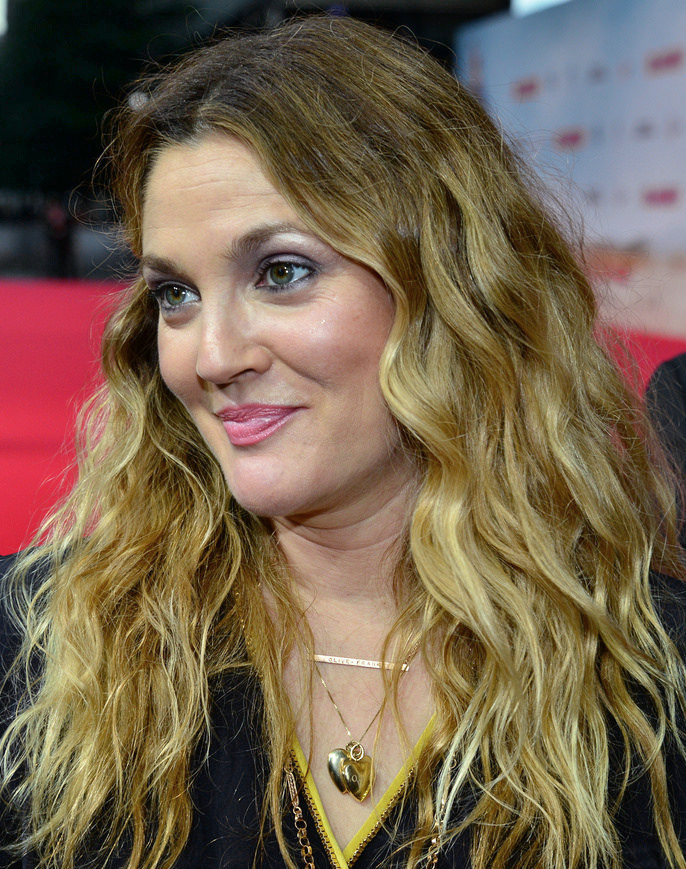
Totals
Award	Wins	Nominations
Alliance of Women Film Journalists	0	1
American Comedy Awards	0	2
Blockbuster Entertainment Awards	3	4
British Academy Film Awards	0	1
Daytime Emmy Awards	1	9
DVD Exclusive Awards	0	1
Dorian Awards	1	1
Elle Women in Hollywood Awards	1	1
GLAAD Media Awards	1	1
Golden Apple Awards	1	1
Golden Globe Awards	1	3
Golden Raspberry Awards	0	4
Gracie Awards	1	1
Guinness World Records	1	0
Hasty Pudding Theatricals	1	1
Hollywood Film Festival	1	1
Hollywood Walk of Fame	1	1
IFTA Film & Drama Awards	0	1
Make-Up Artists & Hair Stylists Guild	1	1
MTV Movie & TV Awards	3	9
MystFest Awards	1	1
NATO Awards	3	3
Nickelodeon Kids' Choice Awards	2	6
Online Film & Television Association	1	3
People's Choice Awards	2	7
Primetime Emmy Awards	0	2
Prism Awards	0	1
Satellite Awards	1	1
Saturn Awards	1	3
Screen Actors Guild Awards	1	1
Stockholm International Film Festival	0	1
Teen Choice Awards	0	12
Utah Film Critics Association	0	1
Women in Film Awards	1	1
Young Artist Awards	3	6
Awards won	36
Nominations	101

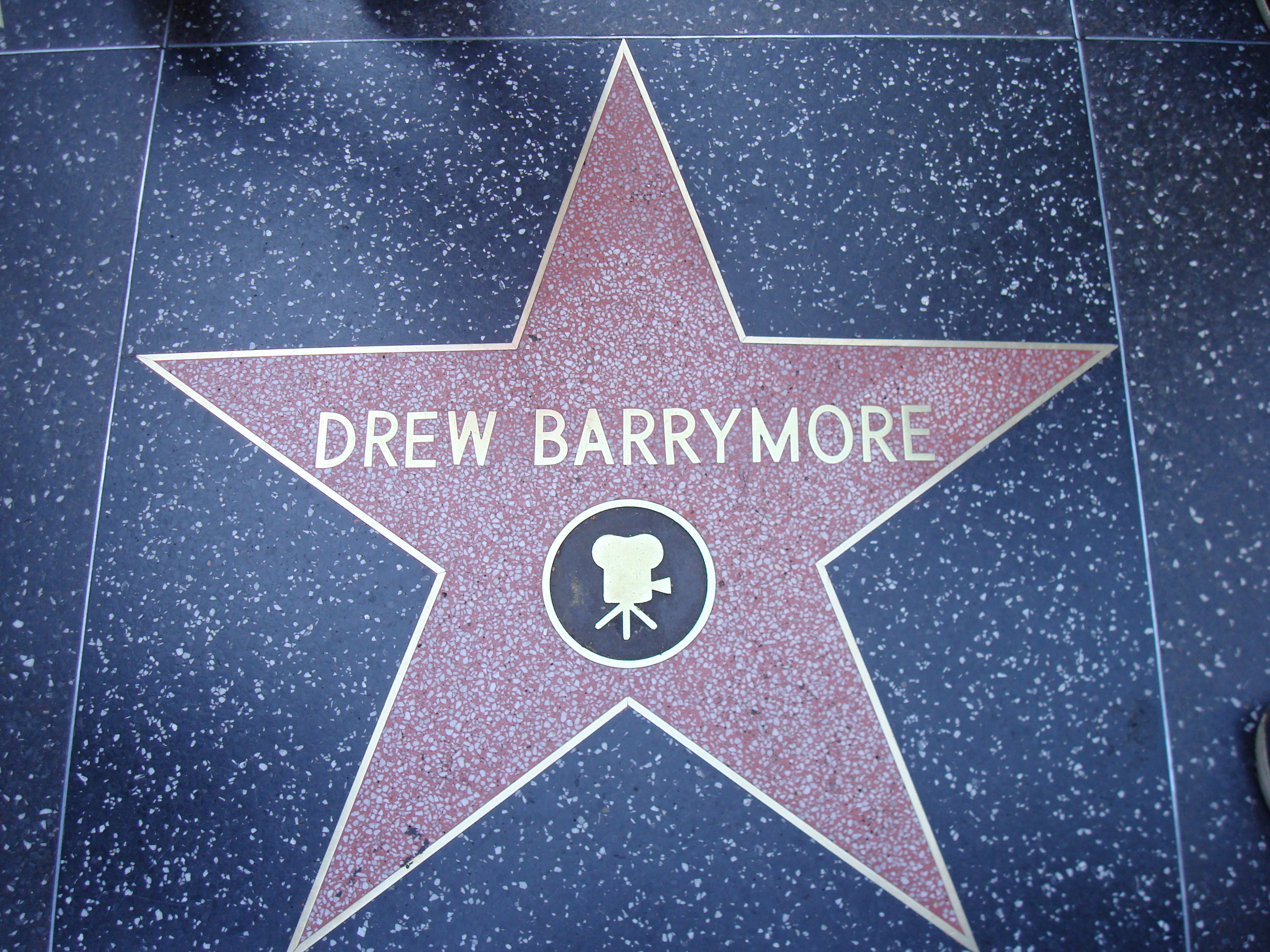
Drew Barrymore's star on the Hollywood Walk of Fame

The following is a list of awards and nominations received by Drew Barrymore.

Drew Barrymore is an American actress, screenwriter, film director and producer. Known for her roles on film, she has received various accolades including a Golden Globe Award, an Emmy Award, and a Screen Actors Guild Award, as well as nominations for a BAFTA Award and ten Emmy Awards.

As a child actor she acted in the Steven Spielberg directed science-fiction coming-of-age drama E.T. the Extra-Terrestrial (1982) for which she was nominated for the BAFTA Award for Most Promising Newcomer to Leading Film Roles. She then acted in the Charles Shyer directed comedy-drama Irreconcilable Differences (1982) for which she received a Golden Globe Award for Best Supporting Actress – Motion Picture nomination.

On television, she received Golden Globe Award for Best Actress – Miniseries or Television Film nominations for her performances as a teenage murderer in the Showtime film Guncrazy (1992) and Edith Bouvier Beale in the HBO film Grey Gardens (2009). The role for the later also earned her the Screen Actors Guild Award for Outstanding Performance by a Female Actor in a Miniseries or Television Movie as well as nomination for the Primetime Emmy Award for Outstanding Lead Actress in a Miniseries or a Movie. As the host of The Drew Barrymore Show she has received eight Daytime Emmy Awards nominations, winning for Outstanding Daytime Talk Series Host in 2025.

In 1999 she received the Women's Image Network Award's Crystal Award. For her contributions to the Entertainment industry, Barrymore received a star on the Hollywood Walk of Fame in 2004. She has also received three Kids' Choice Awards, three MTV Movie & TV Awards, two People's Choice Awards, a Satellite Award, a Saturn Award, and three Young Artist Awards as well as nominations for 13 Teen Choice Awards.

== Major associations ==
=== BAFTA Awards ===
Year	Category	Nominated work	Result	Ref.
British Academy Film Awards
1982	Most Outstanding Newcomer to Leading Film Roles	E.T. the Extra-Terrestrial	Nominated	

=== Emmy Awards ===
Year	Category	Nominated work	Result	Ref.
Primetime Emmy Awards
2000	Outstanding Animated Program (for Programming One Hour or More)	Olive, the Other Reindeer	Nominated	
2009	Outstanding Lead Actress in a Miniseries or a Movie	Grey Gardens	Nominated	
Daytime Emmy Awards
1986	Outstanding Performer in Children's Programming	The Adventures of Con Sawyer and Hucklemary Finn	Nominated	
2021	Outstanding Entertainment Talk Show	The Drew Barrymore Show	Nominated	
2021	Outstanding Entertainment Talk Show Host	The Drew Barrymore Show	Nominated	
2022	Outstanding Entertainment Talk Show	The Drew Barrymore Show	Nominated	
2022	Outstanding Entertainment Talk Show Host	The Drew Barrymore Show	Nominated	
2023	Outstanding Daytime Talk Series	The Drew Barrymore Show	Nominated	
2023	Outstanding Daytime Talk Series Host	The Drew Barrymore Show	Nominated	
2025	Outstanding Daytime Talk Series	The Drew Barrymore Show	Nominated	
2025	Outstanding Daytime Talk Series Host	The Drew Barrymore Show	Won	

=== Golden Globe Awards ===
Year	Category	Nominated work	Result	Ref.
1984	Best Supporting Actress – Motion Picture	Irreconcilable Differences	Nominated	
1992	Best Actress in a Miniseries or Television Film	Guncrazy	Nominated	
2009	Best Actress in a Miniseries or Television Film	Grey Gardens	Won	

=== Screen Actors Guild Awards ===
Year	Category	Nominated work	Result	Ref.
2009	Outstanding Performance by a Female Actor in a Miniseries or Television Movie	Grey Gardens	Won	

== Miscellaneous awards ==
=== Alliance of Women Film Journalists Awards ===
Year	Category	Nominated work	Result	Ref.
2009	EDA Female Focus Award – Perseverance Award	Whip It	Nominated	

=== American Comedy Awards ===
Year	Category	Nominated work	Result	Ref.
1999	Funniest Actress in a Motion Picture	The Wedding Singer	Nominated	
2000	Funniest Actress in a Motion Picture	Never Been Kissed	Nominated	

=== Blockbuster Entertainment Awards ===
Year	Category	Nominated work	Result	Ref.
1999	Favorite Actress – Comedy	The Wedding Singer	Nominated	
1999	Favorite Actress – Drama/Romance	Ever After	Won	
2000	Favorite Actress – Comedy/Romance	Never Been Kissed	Won	
2001	Favorite Action Team – Internet	Charlie's Angels	Won (Note: Shared with Cameron Diaz and Lucy Liu)	

=== DVD Exclusive Awards ===
Year	Category	Nominated work	Result	Ref.
2001	Best Supporting Actress	Skipped Parts	Nominated	

=== Dorian Awards ===
Year	Category	Nominated work	Result	Ref.
2009	TV Performance of the Year – Drama	Grey Gardens	Won	
2010	Campy Film of the Year	Whip It	Nominated	

=== Elle Women in Hollywood Awards ===
Year	Category	Nominated work	Result	Ref.
2000	Icon Award	Herself	Won (Note: Shared with Glenn Close, Goldie Hawn, Gwyneth Paltrow, Holly Hunter, Laurie MacDonald, and Lauren Shuler Donner)	

=== GLAAD Media Awards ===
Year	Category	Nominated work	Result	Ref.
2010	GLAAD Vanguard Award	Herself	Won	

=== Golden Apple Awards ===
Year	Category	Nominated work	Result	Ref.
2001	Female Star of the Year	Herself	Won	

=== Golden Raspberry Awards ===
Year	Category	Nominated work	Result	Ref.
2001	Worst Supporting Actress	Freddy Got Fingered	Nominated	
2003	Worst Actress	Charlie's Angels: Full Throttle	Nominated	
2003	Worst Actress	Duplex	Nominated	
2015	Worst Actress	Blended	Nominated	

=== Gracie Awards ===
Year	Category	Nominated work	Result	Ref.
2010	Outstanding Female Lead in a Drama Special	Grey Gardens	Won	
2017	Outstanding Actress in a Featured or Guest Role	Odd Mom Out	Won	

=== Guinness World Records ===
Year	Category	Nominated work	Result	Ref.
2017	Wearer of World's Widest Wig (7'4")	Awarded Live on The Tonight Show Starring Jimmy Fallon	Won	

=== Hasty Pudding Theatricals ===
Year	Category	Nominated work	Result	Ref.
2001	Woman of the Year	Herself	Won	

=== Hollywood Film Festival ===
Year	Category	Nominated work	Result	Ref.
1999	Actress of the Year	Herself	Won	

=== Hollywood Walk of Fame ===
Year	Category	Nominated work	Result	Ref.
2004	Motion Pictures Star	Herself	Won	

=== IFTA Film & Drama Awards ===
Year	Category	Nominated work	Result	Ref.
2005	Audience Award – Best International Actress	Fever Pitch	Nominated	

=== Make-Up Artists & Hair Stylists Guild Awards ===
Year	Category	Nominated work	Result	Ref.
2001	Barrymore Award	Herself	Won	

=== MTV Movie & TV Awards ===
Year	Category	Nominated work	Result	Ref.
1998	Best Kiss	The Wedding Singer	Won (Note: Shared with Adam Sandler)	
1998	Best On-Screen Duo	The Wedding Singer	Nominated	
2000	Best Female Performance	Never Been Kissed	Nominated	
2000	Best Kiss	Never Been Kissed	Nominated (Note: Shared with Michael Vartan)	
2001	Best On-Screen Team	Charlie's Angels	Won (Note: Shared with Cameron Diaz and Lucy Liu)	
2001	Best Fight (herself vs. Attackers)	Charlie's Angels	Nominated	
2004	Best Dance Sequence	Charlie's Angels: Full Throttle	Nominated	
2004	Best On-Screen Team	50 First Dates	Won	
2004	Best Female Performance	50 First Dates	Nominated	

=== MystFest Awards ===
Year	Category	Nominated work	Result	Ref.
1993	Best Actress	Guncrazy	Won	

=== National Association of Theatre Owners Awards ===
Year	Category	Nominated work	Result	Ref.
2000	ShoWest Convention Special – Comedy Star of the Year	Herself	Won	
2004	ShoWest Convention Special – Distinguished Decade of Achievement in Film	Herself	Won	
2014	CinemaCon Award – Female Star of the Year	Herself	Won	

=== Nickelodeon Kids' Choice Awards ===
Year	Category	Nominated work	Result	Ref.
1999	Favorite Movie Actress	Ever After and The Wedding Singer	Won	
2000	Favorite Movie Actress	Never Been Kissed	Nominated	
2001	Favorite Movie Actress	Charlie's Angels	Won	
2005	Favorite Movie Actress	50 First Dates	Nominated	
2006	Favorite Movie Actress	Fever Pitch	Nominated	
2008	Favorite Movie Actress	Music and Lyrics	Nominated	

=== Online Film & Television Association Awards ===
Year	Category	Nominated work	Result	Ref.
1999	Best Sci-Fi / Fantasy / Horror Actress	Ever After	Nominated	
2001	Best Voice-Over Performance	Titan A.E.	Nominated	
2009	Best Actress in a Motion Picture or Miniseries	Grey Gardens	Won	

=== People's Choice Awards ===
Year	Category	Nominated work	Result	Ref.
2004	Favorite On-Screen Chemistry	50 First Dates	Won	
2004	Favorite Leading Lady	Herself	Nominated	
2005	Favorite Funny Female Star	Herself	Nominated	
2007	Favorite Leading Lady	Herself	Won	
2008	Favorite Star Under 35	Herself	Nominated	
2009	Favorite Movie Actress	Herself	Nominated	
2010	Favorite Comedic Actress	Going the Distance	Nominated	
2014	Favorite Comedic Actress	Blended	Nominated	

=== Prism Awards ===
Year	Category	Nominated work	Result	Ref.
2010	Performance in a TV Movie or Miniseries	Grey Gardens	Nominated	

=== Satellite Awards ===
Year	Category	Nominated work	Result	Ref.
2009	Best Actress in a Miniseries or a Motion Picture Made for TV	Grey Gardens	Won	

=== Saturn Awards ===
Year	Category	Nominated work	Result	Ref.
1984	Best Performance by a Younger Actor	Firestarter	Nominated	
1996	Best Supporting Actress	Scream	Nominated	
1998	Best Actress	Ever After	Won	

=== Stockholm International Film Festival ===
Year	Category	Nominated work	Result	Ref.
2009	Bronze Horse Award	Whip It	Nominated	

=== Teen Choice Awards ===
Year	Category	Nominated work	Result	Ref.
1999	Choice Female Hottie	Herself	Nominated	
1999	Choice Movie Actress	Ever After and Never Been Kissed	Nominated	
2001	Choice Movie Actress	Charlie's Angels	Nominated	
2001	Choice Movie: Wipeout	Charlie's Angels	Nominated	
2002	Choice Movie Actress: Action/Drama	Riding in Cars with Boys	Nominated	
2004	Choice Movie: Chemistry	50 First Dates	Nominated	
2004	Choice Movie: Liplock (shared with Sandler)	50 First Dates	Nominated	
2004	Choice Movie Actress: Comedy	50 First Dates	Nominated	
2005	Choice Movie Actress: Comedy	Fever Pitch	Nominated	
2005	Choice Movie: Chemistry	Fever Pitch	Nominated (Note: Shared with Jimmy Fallon)	
2005	Choice Movie: Liplock	Fever Pitch	Nominated	
2005	Choice Movie: Love Scene	Fever Pitch	Nominated	
2007	Choice Movie: Liplock	Music and Lyrics	Nominated (Note: Shared with Hugh Grant)	
2014	Choice Movie Actress: Comedy	Blended	Nominated	

=== Utah Film Critics Association Awards ===
Year	Category	Nominated work	Result	Ref.
1982	Best Supporting Actress	E.T. the Extra-Terrestrial	Nominated	

=== Women's Image Network Awards ===
Year	Category	Nominated work	Result	Ref.
1999	Crystal Award	Herself	Won	
2009	Outstanding Actress Feature Film	Whip It	Nominated	

=== Young Artist Awards ===
Year	Category	Nominated work	Result	Ref.
1982	Best Young Supporting Actress in a Motion Picture	E.T. the Extra-Terrestrial	Won	
1984	Best Young Actress in a Motion Picture – Musical, Comedy, Adventure or Drama	Irreconcilable Differences	Won	
1985	Best Starring Performance by a Young Actress – Motion Picture	Cat's Eye	Nominated	
1986	Exceptional Young Actresses in Animation – Series, Specials or Feature Film	Star Fairies	Nominated	
1987	Best Young Female Superstar in Television	Babes in Toyland	Nominated	
1998	Former Child Star Lifetime Achievement Award	Herself	Won	
