= The Land Before Time (TV series) =

2007–2008 American musical TV series

- Genre: Adventure; Fantasy
- Created by: Charles Grosvenor; Judy Freudberg; Tony Geiss
- Based on: Characters by Judy Freudberg; Tony Geiss
- Developed by: Ford Riley
- Directed by: Scott Heming; Dick Sebast
- Voices of: Cody Arens; Anndi McAfee; Aria Curzon; Jeff Bennett; Rob Paulsen; Max Burkholder; Meghan Strange Kenneth Mars; Miriam Flynn; John Ingle; Tress MacNeille; Pete Sepenuk; Dorian Harewood; Jessica Gee
- Theme music composer: Rocco Gagliese; Steve D'Angelo; Terry Tompkins
- Opening theme: "The Land Before Time Theme Song", performed by Ladysmith Black Mambazo
- Ending theme: "The Land Before Time Theme Song" (instrumental)
- Composers: Cory Lerios (score); Michele Brourman (songs)
- Country of origin: United States
- Original language: English
- No. of seasons: 2
- No. of episodes: 26

Production
- Producer: Diane A. Crea
- Running time: 23 minutes
- Production companies: Amblin Entertainment; Universal Animation Studios

Original release
- Network: Cartoon Network
- Release: March 5, 2007 – January 21, 2008

Related
- The Land Before Time XIII: The Wisdom of Friends (2007); The Land Before Time XIV: Journey of the Brave (2016)

The Land Before Time is an American animated musical television series, based on The Land Before Time film series’ characters created by Judy Freudberg and Tony Geiss. It was developed for television by Ford Riley for Cartoon Network and was produced by Universal Animation Studios and Amblin Entertainment (Amblin Entertainment produced the first film with Sullivan Bluth Studios), and animated by Wang Film Productions in Taiwan and Toon City in the Philippines. It premiered on YTV in Canada for a test on January 5, 2007 and premiered on Cartoon Network in the United States on March 5.

It was made as traditionally animated with CGI backgrounds, which the past sequels from The Land Before Time X: The Great Longneck Migration onwards have used, with occasional cel-shaded computer-animated characters in wide shots. The main antagonists in the series are Red Claw, an evil villainous Tyrannosaurus, and Screech and Thud, a pair of henchmen Deinonychus. The TV series takes place between the events of The Wisdom of Friends and Journey of the Brave, due to Chomper and Ruby being absent in the former film.

== Voice cast ==
=== Main ===
- Cody Arens as Littlefoot (Anthony Skillman performs Littlefoot's singing voice; uncredited)
- Anndi McAfee as Cera
- Aria Curzon as Ducky
- Jeff Bennett as Petrie
- Rob Paulsen as Spike, Thud (before uncredited)
- Max Burkholder as Chomper
- Meghan Strange as Ruby
- Pete Sepenuk as Red Claw, Screech (before uncredited)

=== Recurring ===
- Kenneth Mars as Grandpa Longneck
- Miriam Flynn as Grandma Longneck
- John Ingle as Daddy Topps
- Tress MacNeille as Petrie's Mother / Ducky and Spike's Mother
- Dorian Harewood as Mr. Thicknose
- Jessica Gee as Tria
- Meghan Strange as Tricia

=== Guest appearances ===
- Anndi McAfee as Lydia / Corythosaurus
- Aria Curzon as Ceratogaulus Girl
- Jeff Bennett as Apatosaurus #2 / Ruby's brother / Skip / Mutt / Doc / Kosh (The Amazing Threehorn Girl) / Ceratogaulus Elder
- Rob Paulsen as Ruby's Father / Apatosaurus #1 / Hidden Runner / Mo / Milo / Stegosaurus / Guido / Lambeosaurus
- Meghan Strange as Plower / Maiasaura / Iguanodon / Corythosaurus / Ruby's sister
- Pete Sepenuk as Kosh (The Star Day Celebration) / Saro / Allosaurus
- Nika Futterman as Ruby's Mother / Ali
- Elizabeth Daily as Rhett / Shorty
- Jessica Walter as Old One
- Cree Summer as Tippy
- Susan Krebs as Tippy's mother
- Cam Clarke as Bron
- Susan Blu as Dara
- Mikey Kelley as Hyp
- Scott Menville as Nod / Mother Deinonychus
- Kevin Michael Richardson as Scuttle
- Dorian Harewood as Great Hideous Beast
- Jess Harnell as Swooper
- Dee Bradley Baker as Baby Acrocanthosaurus (uncredited) / Sarcosuchus pack

== Episodes ==
=== Series overview ===
Season	Episodes	Originally released	
Season	Episodes	First released	Last released
1	15	March 5, 2007	March 23, 2007
2	11	January 7, 2008	January 21, 2008

=== Season 1 (2007) ===
No. overall	No. in season	Title	Directed by	Written by	Storyboard by	Original release date
1	1	"The Cave of Many Voices"	Scott Heming	Ford Riley	Patricia Wong, Dave Williams and Viki Anderson	March 5, 2007
Chomper realizes his secret cave in the Great Valley becomes leaky and the gang goes exploring in the deep caves to search for another suitable cave for Chomper to live in. Meanwhile, the gang's new member, a Fast Runner named Ruby, teaches Ducky how to act and talk big.
2	2	"The Mysterious Tooth Crisis"	Richard Sebast	Jack Monaco	Robert Sledge, Dean Criswell and Liz Holzman	March 6, 2007
When Chomper loses his tooth, he, Littlefoot, Petrie and Ducky travel around the Great Valley to figure out what is wrong. Meanwhile, Cera, Spike and Ruby relax in Tria's secret mud spa.
3	3	"The Star Day Celebration"	Scott Heming	Krista Tucker	Patrick Archibald, Curtis Cim and Larry Scholl	March 7, 2007
Ruby misses her family on her "Star Day" (birthday) and the gang tries to help cheer her up by being true friends and bringing Ruby her favorite food.
4	4	"The Canyon of Shiny Stones"	Richard Sebast	John Loy	Kathy Carr, Patricia Wong and Flammarion Ferreira	March 8, 2007
When Cera accidentally loses Tria's special shiny stone, the group decides to find a new stone to return to Tria by traveling to the Canyon of Shiny Stones.
5	5	"The Great Log Running Game"	Scott Heming	Phil Harnage	Ken Kessel, Bert Ring and Clint Taylor	March 9, 2007
While trying to get a tree sweet, Ducky makes up a game called the "Log Running Game", and competes against the group in a competition on how long they can run on a log in the water. But when Cera tries to prove Threehorns are the best, she gets swept away on a log to Roaring Falls, forcing the gang and Topps to try and save her.
6	6	"The Brave Longneck Scheme"	Richard Sebast	Phil Walsh	Boyd Kirkland, Dan Root and Robert Sledge	March 12, 2007
Ali's herd returns to the Great Valley, and Littlefoot and Cera find out that Ali has a new friend, Rhett, who boasts about himself and claims Sharpteeth fear him. The gang decides to bring a real Sharptooth (Chomper) to convince Ali that Rhett is making up the stories. However, when Rhett sees Chomper, he runs away to tell his herd, who in turn come to kill Chomper. They let Chomper live after the kids confess the truth, the gang for their prank and Rhett for making up the stories.
7	7	"The Meadow of Jumping Waters"	Scott Heming	Jack Monaco	Curtis Cim, Larry Latham and Larry Scholl	March 13, 2007
The gang decides to travel beyond the Sheltering Grass to see the Meadow of Jumping Waters that Ruby and Chomper passed by when traveling to the Great Valley.
8	8	"The Days of Rising Waters"	Richard Sebast	Catherine Lieuwen	Boyd Kirkland, Ken Kessel and Lenord Robinson	March 14, 2007
When a heavy rainstorm wipes out Petrie's nest, he flips out at the prospect of having to move. Meanwhile, Cera insists that Ducky takes on the seemingly impossible task of teaching Tricia how to swim.
9	9	"Escape from the Mysterious Beyond"	Scott Heming	Jack Monaco	Craig Kemplin, Bert Ring and Rick Hoberg	March 15, 2007
When exploring inside the caves, the group accidentally goes into the Mysterious Beyond and get chased by Red Claw, Screech and Thud. An earthshake occurs, and Chomper and Ducky get trapped on a ridge with Thud.
10	10	"The Hidden Canyon"	Richard Sebast	Don Gillies	Dan Fausett, Kelly James and Robert Sledge	March 16, 2007
When the kids discover a hidden canyon filled with fruit trees, they decide to keep the place a secret, but the secret becomes dangerous when Red Claw and his henchmen use the canyon to enter the Great Valley. NOTE: This episode was previously released as a bonus feature on the standalone DVD release of The Land Before Time XIII: The Wisdom of Friends before also getting included in the Complete Series set.
11	11	"The Legend of the Story Speakers"	Scott Heming	Kent Redeker	Larry Latham, Eric McConnell and Jeff Scott	March 19, 2007
Grandpa Longneck tells Littlefoot and his friends stories about why Longnecks have long necks and about Starwatcher. And then Grandpa Longneck and Saro, his old friend, meet. Saro tells him that all the Longnecks are forgetting the great Longneck stories and he needs to come with him to tell them again, but Grandpa Longneck refuses as he has a home in the Great Valley. Angry, Saro runs out, and Littlefoot and Chomper follow him into the Mysterious Beyond. Saro tells Littlefoot and Chomper a story about Tall Stepper, a Longneck who saved his sister from the wind.
12	12	"The Bright Circle Celebration"	Richard Sebast	Corey Powell	Boyd Kirkland, Lenord Robinson and Clint Taylor	March 20, 2007
Petrie is very excited about the Bright Circle Celebration, but Cera thinks it is silly to thank the Bright Circle for shining. Cera and her dad steer clear of everyone preparing for the festivities, but they rush in to help when a fire threatens everything.
13	13	"The Lonely Journey"	Scott Heming	Noelle Wright	Rick Hoberg, Bert Ring and Mike Sosnowski	March 21, 2007
Chomper is lonely being the only Sharptooth in the Great Valley, so he decides to go to the Mysterious Beyond to teach the Sharpteeth how to be friends.
14	14	"The Missing Fast-Water Adventure"	Richard Sebast	Don Gillies	Kelly James, Boyd Kirkland, Dan Root and Robert Sledge	March 22, 2007
When an earthshake (earthquake) causes the fast-water (river) to dry up, the dinosaurs decide to try and fix the problem by removing the rocks. On the way, they meet an old friend, Mo.
15	15	"The Spooky Nighttime Adventure"	Scott Heming	Jack Monaco	Sahin Ersoz, Larry Latham and Eric McConnell	March 23, 2007
One night, Ruby tells the group a scary story about an invisible dinosaur named "Hidden Runner" and gives everyone scary sleep stories. They see Mr. Thicknose to tell him that she made up the story and there is nothing to worry about, but the story of Hidden Runner was true, and they decide to venture into the Mysterious Beyond to search for him.

=== Season 2 (2008) ===
No. overall	No. in season	Title	Directed by	Written by	Storyboard by	Original release date
16	1	"The Lone Dinosaur Returns"	Richard Sebast	Phil Walsh	Dean Criswell, Boyd Kirkland, Jeff Scott and Dave Williams	January 7, 2008
One day, Doc, The Lone Dinosaur, comes back to the Great Valley in search of his lady friend, Dara. After Chomper hears the stories of him and how he despises Sharpteeth, the dinosaurs try to hide him.
17	2	"Stranger from the Mysterious Above"	Scott Heming	Holly Huckins	Kathy Carr, Celia Kendrick and Bert Ring	January 8, 2008
When Spike falls down a hole, he encounters a colony of horned gophers who think of him as the "Big Wise One" from the Mysterious Above who can save them from a Microceratus whom they name "Great Hideous Beast". Meanwhile, his friends try to save him but only find trouble when Mr. Thicknose and Topps cannot agree on what to do.
18	3	"The Forbidden Friendship"	Scott Heming	John Loy	Celia Kendrick, Bert Ring and Rafael Rosado	January 9, 2008
When Tippy's herd comes back, the adults get into a fight and the kids cannot play with each other, but they sneak out and find green food.
19	4	"The Amazing Threehorn Girl"	Scott Heming	Jack Monaco	Larry Latham, Eric McConnell and Rafael Rosado	January 10, 2008
When the gang gets chased by a pair of Belly Draggers, Cera gets separated from the others and ends up trapped, but she accidentally sets off a rock slide that frightens the Belly Draggers away. When she finds the gang and tells them about it, Petrie flies around telling everyone in the valley, and suddenly everyone thinks Cera is a hero, even when she insists she is not, but she soon lets the fame go to her head and begins to fabricate her story, which Littlefoot and Ruby become skeptical of. However, the Belly Draggers return, and they have brought friends.
20	5	"The Big Longneck Test"	Richard Sebast	Ford Riley	Patrick Archibald and Dean Criswell	January 11, 2008
Littlefoot gets a visit from his father and adoptive older brother, getting the news that he will be taking "The Big Longneck Test", a test of three stages to see if a Longneck is capable of leading a herd. While Littlefoot takes the test, Shorty tries to lead his younger brother's friends on an adventure. NOTE: This is the only episode not on any DVD releases besides the Complete Series set.
21	6	"The Hermit of Black Rock"	Richard Sebast	Don Gillies	Rick Hoberg, Boyd Kirkland and Robert Sledge	January 14, 2008
On a windy day, when Guido and Petrie practice gliding, they are blown into Black Rock and are trapped because Petrie hurts his wing, Guido hurts his foot, and there seems to be no way out, but a blind old hermit and flyer named Swooper decides to help.
22	7	"Return to Hanging Rock"	Richard Sebast	Jack Monaco	Patrick Archibald, Boyd Kirkland and Clint Taylor	January 15, 2008
On the day of the Flying Rocks of Many Nights (meteor shower), Ruby remembers a memory of her family meeting at Hanging Rock when she lived in the Mysterious Beyond. Ruby adventures alone to find her family, but Chomper, Ducky and Spike come along to help. Along the way, they meet Skip, a mammal who knows the Mysterious Beyond very well, and the gang learns an important lesson of being family.
23	8	"March of the Sand Creepers"	Richard Sebast	Don Gillies	Rick Hoberg, Boyd Kirkland, Robert Sledge and Clint Taylor	January 16, 2008
One morning, a herd of "Sand Creepers" (crabs) mysteriously come to the Great Valley. Curious, Littlefoot, Cera, Petrie, Chomper, and Ruby set off to an adventure to find out why the Sand Creepers have come to the Great Valley. They meet Scuttle, a Sand Creeper who can speak the language of leaf-eaters, and try to enlist his help, but Scuttle tries to take advantage of them to the chagrin of Cera.
24	9	"Search for the Sky Color Stones"	Scott Heming	Jack Monaco	Curtis Cim, Larry Latham and Eric McConnell	January 17, 2008
When the gang sees the sky colors in the sky disappear (a rainbow), the gang splits up to find sky color stones (geodes).
25	10	"Through the Eyes of a Spiketail"	Richard Sebast	Ford Riley	Rick Hoberg, Boyd Kirkland and Robert Sledge	January 18, 2008
An episode involving hearing Spike's thoughts.
26	11	"The Great Egg Adventure"	Scott Heming	Noelle Wright	Curtis Cim, Jeff McGrath and Jeff Scott	January 21, 2008
Littlefoot, Ducky, Petrie and Chomper (followed by Hyp, Nod and Mutt) find a nest of three Fast Biter eggs. They decide to carry the eggs away from the valley so the baby Sharpteeth can grow up without eating anyone, and set off on a journey into the Mysterious Beyond. When a mother Fast Biter sees that her eggs have been stolen, she becomes very angry and starts tracking them.

== Production ==
In August 2005, it was reported that Universal Studios Home Entertainment Family Productions had begun production on a 26 episode TV series based on The Land Before Time to debut on Cartoon Network in 2007 followed by a home media release by Universal.

== Broadcast ==
The show premiered on Cartoon Network in the United States on March 5, 2007. Reruns of the series began airing on Sprout in January 2017, and were subsequently moved to Universal Kids upon the channel's launch on September 9, 2017.

== Reception ==
Michael D. Schaffer of the Philadelphia Inquirer said that the animation in the series, although below that of the original 1988 film, was above-average for modern television. Although he praised the theme song, saying it had a "bouncy, almost calypso beat", he was less pleased with the songs "Adventuring" and "Talking Big". He finally described the series as "bland, inoffensive stuff", and appropriate viewing for very young audiences.

== Merchandise ==
Universal Studios Consumer Products Group and Playmates Toys announced a domestic licensing agreement, whereby Playmates served as the master toy license for the then-upcoming animated television series, The Land Before Time. The 22-minute animated series aired on Cartoon Network beginning in spring 2007. The toy line launched in fall 2007 with the introduction of a full line of figures, vehicles, playsets and plush.

== Home media ==
24 episodes of the series were released on DVD by Universal Studios Home Entertainment between 2007–2008 in North America (region 1) and 2010 in Australia (region 4) in the form of six four-episode volumes. A six-disc box set was later released in the UK (region 2) in 2012 containing the 24 episodes from the previous volumes. Two episodes were not included in those releases: "The Hidden Canyon" and "The Big Longneck Test". Only "The Hidden Canyon" was later released as a special feature on the stand-alone DVD release of The Land Before Time XIII: The Wisdom of Friends. In June 2022, a complete TV series DVD was released, not only marking the first time "The Big Longneck Test" has been released on home media but also the first time any episode has been released in widescreen format on a Region 1 DVD.

Vol.	DVD name	Release dates			Episodes
Vol.	DVD name	Region 1	Region 4	Region 2	Episodes
1	Amazing Adventures!	August 28, 2007	March 31, 2010		"The Cave of Many Voices" (1), "Canyon of the Shiny Stones" (4), "The Meadow of Jumping Waters" (7), "The Spooky Nighttime Adventure" (15)
2	Good Times & Good Friends	November 27, 2007	March 31, 2010		"The Star Day Celebration" (3), "The Brave Longneck Scheme" (6), "The Great Log Running Game" (5), "The Bright Circle Celebration" (12)
3	Adventuring in the Mysterious Beyond	February 19, 2008	June 30, 2010		"The Great Egg Adventure" (26), "Escape from the Mysterious Beyond" (9), "The Lonely Journey" (13), "The Hermit of Black Rock" (21)
4	Through the Eyes of a Spiketail	May 13, 2008	June 30, 2010		"Through the Eyes of a Spiketail" (25), "Stranger from the Mysterious Above" (17), "March of the Sand Creepers" (23), "The Forbidden Friendship" (18)
5	Magical Discoveries	August 26, 2008	September 1, 2010		"Search for the Sky Color Stones" (24), "The Amazing Threehorn Girl" (19), "Days of Rising Waters" (8), "Return to Hanging Rock" (22)
6	Friends Forever	December 2, 2008	September 1, 2010		"The Mysterious Tooth Crisis" (2), "The Missing Fast-Water Adventure" (14), "The Lone Dinosaur Returns" (16), "Legend of the Story Speakers" (11)
1–6	Complete TV Series	June 7, 2022		March 12, 2012	Region 2 DVD only contains the 24 episodes from previous volumes. Region 1 DVD contains all 26 episodes.

== Music ==
The songs are edited and written by Michele Brourman (music) and Ford Riley (lyrics).

The theme song is performed by the South African choir Ladysmith Black Mambazo. The theme is written by Rocco Gagliese, Steve D'Angelo, and Terry Tompkins of Eggplant LLC. The music score is by Cory Lerios.

== See also ==
- Dink, the Little Dinosaur
