= Cody Arens =

American actor (born 1993)

- Born: November 8, 1993 (age 32); Richmond, Vermont, U.S.
- Occupation: Actor
- Years active: 1999–present
- Family: Logan Arens (brother)

Cody Arens (born November 8, 1993) is an American actor. He is the brother of Logan Arens and Skye Arens.

== Career ==
He is most notable for the voice of Littlefoot in The Land Before Time television series based on the films and The Land Before Time XIII: The Wisdom of Friends and as the role of Liam Fitzpatrick, the younger brother of Maddie Fitzpatrick, on The Suite Life of Zack & Cody. He also plays as the young Ethan Kendrick in the film D-War, which was released in the United States on September 14, 2007, and is the voice of young Jaster in Rogue Galaxy. He also had a minor role in Meet the Parents in 2000 and Anger Management in 2003.

== Filmography ==
=== Film ===
Year	Title	Role	Notes
2000	Meet the Parents	Little Boy	
2001	Riding in Cars with Boys	Jason - Aged 6	
2003	Anger Management	Boy at Yankee Stadium	
2004	Grandpa's Place	Jason D Jafman	
2004	Plainsong	Bobby Guthrie	TV movie
2004	Single Santa Seeks Mrs. Claus	Christian	TV movie
2004	Shadow Man	Kevin	Short Film
2004	Prodigy		TV movie
2005	Detective	Jason Ainslie	TV movie
2007	D-War	Young Ethan	
2007	The Land Before Time XIII: The Wisdom of Friends	Littlefoot (voice)	Direct-to-Video

=== Television ===
Year	Title	Role	Notes
1999	Law & Order	Jackie Bender	Episode: "Hunters"
2000	Spin City	Kid #1	Episode: "Uneasy Rider"
2001	Third Watch	Richardson's Son	Episode: "A Hero's Rest"
2001	Becker	Boy	Episode: "Sue You"
2001	Sex and the City	Martin Watson	Episode: "Baby, Talk Is Cheap"
2002	Family Affair	Duncan	Episode: "The Room Parent"
2003	The Shield	Mike Jr.	Episode: "Homewrecker"
2003	Lucky	Adam	Episode: "Calling Dr. Con"
2003	Malcolm in the Middle	Young Malcolm	Episode: "Garage Sale"
2003	Crossing Jordan	Mike Stackhouse	Episode: "Sunset Division"
2003	The Division	Casey at 7	Episode: "Wish You Were Here"
2006	The Suite Life of Zack & Cody	Liam Fitzpatrick	Episode: "Not So Suite 16"
2007–2008	The Land Before Time	Littlefoot	Main Voice role; 26 episodes

=== Video games ===
Year	Title	Role	Notes
2005	Rogue Galaxy	Jaster Child	English Version

== Awards ==
In 2005, Cody won a Young Artist Award for the 2004 TV Movie Plainsong.
