= Beverly Donofrio =

American writer (born 1950)

- Born: Beverly Ann Donofrio; September 23, 1950 (age 75); United States
- Education: Wesleyan University (BA); Columbia University (MA)
- Occupations: Memoirist, author, writer, academic
- Notable work: Riding in Cars with Boys

Beverly Ann Donofrio (born September 23, 1950) is an American memoirist, children's author, and creative writing teacher known for her 1992 best selling memoir, Riding in Cars with Boys. The memoir was adapted into the 2001 film Riding in Cars with Boys, directed by Penny Marshall, with Drew Barrymore portraying Donofrio.

== Early life and education ==
Donofrio's parents are Italian-American. She was raised in Wallingford, Connecticut and graduated from Lyman Hall High School. Donofrio studied literature at Wesleyan University and earned an MFA from Columbia University.

== Career ==
Donofrio is a prolific essayist, having published work in numerous anthologies, in The New York Times, The Washington Post Sunday Magazine, The Village Voice, the Los Angeles Times, and in such magazines as Allure, Cosmopolitan, O, The Oprah Magazine, and Marie Claire.

Donofrio has taught writing at New York University and the University of Wyoming, among other institutions. She teaches at the Low Residency MFA Program in Creative Writing at Wilkes University.

== Personal life ==
Donofrio lives in New York.

== Works ==
=== Memoirs ===
- 1992: Riding in Cars with Boys
- 2001: Looking for Mary, or the Blessed Mother and Me
- 2013: Astonished, a Story of Evil, Blessings, Grace, and Solace (Viking/Penguin)

=== Children's books ===
- 2007: Mary and the Mouse, the Mouse and Mary (Random House)
- 2008: Thank You, Lucky Stars (Random House)

=== Essays ===
- 2009: The Face in the Mirror: Writers Reflect on Their Dreams of Youth and the Reality of Age ISBN 978-1-59102-752-2
