= No Place to Hide (1993 film) =

- Directed by: Richard Danus
- Written by: Richard Danus
- Starring: Kris Kristofferson; Drew Barrymore; Martin Landau; O. J. Simpson; Dey Young; Bruce Weitz
- Cinematography: Roberto D'Ettorre Piazzoli
- Music by: Robert O. Ragland
- Production company: Cannon Pictures Inc.
- Release date: April 16, 1993
- Running time: 98 minutes
- Language: English
- Box office: $135,004

No Place to Hide is a 1993 American detective film. Although completed in 1990, the movie sat unreleased for three years. It is the first and only feature film directed by episodic TV veteran Richard Danus (1936 - 2020), who also wrote the screenplay.

== Cast ==
- Kris Kristofferson as Joe Garvey
- Drew Barrymore as Tinsel Hanley / The Narrator
- Martin Landau as Frank McCoy
- Illana Diamant as Joline
- O. J. Simpson as Allie Wheeler
- Dey Young as Karen
- Bruce Weitz as Captain Nelson Silva
- Seth Marten as Harold Rosen
- Lydie Denier as Pamela Hanley
- Kane Hodder as Weller
- Lilyan Chauvin as Mother Superior

== Reception ==
The picture was widely panned by critics, particularly Richard Harrington of the Washington Post: "No Place to Hide is so bad it's not even any good. No guilty pleasures are to be found in its preposterously clumsy plot, or in the limp performance of Kris Kristofferson; someone check his pulse. Even Drew Barrymore regresses from the promise of Guncrazy by being forced to play a petulant 14-year-old caught up in a web of murder and intrigue. For both actors, this film is a triumph of underachievement...The laconic Kristofferson's acting range is measured between squinting eyes and a grinding jaw...The gradually-developing bond between Kris and Drew is excruciatingly detailed in the latter's voiced-over diary entries. It's all very embarrassing...Director Richard Danus, who beats his own script to a pulp, has no idea where to take any of this; loose plot threads abound. The inevitable revelation of a secret society run by Dirty Harry-type elitists is simply ridiculous; if ever a film needed a Satanic subplot, it's this one. In any number of confrontations with Drew's would-be-killer (who looks and acts suspiciously like The Shadow), Kristofferson tells Barrymore to 'Run, run...! Get out of here!' Take those as subliminal messages."

Throughout their lives after the film, Kristofferson and Landau were, apparently, not fans of the film themselves. Once, when asked about the picture by a fan, Landau's retort was "Why would you want to know about that one?" For his part, Kristofferson often pretended to not even remember making the film.

Barrymore also renounced the picture, claiming, "It's not even a B-movie; it's more like a D-movie. I took the role mostly because I needed the work."
