= Drew Barrymore =

American actress (born 1975)

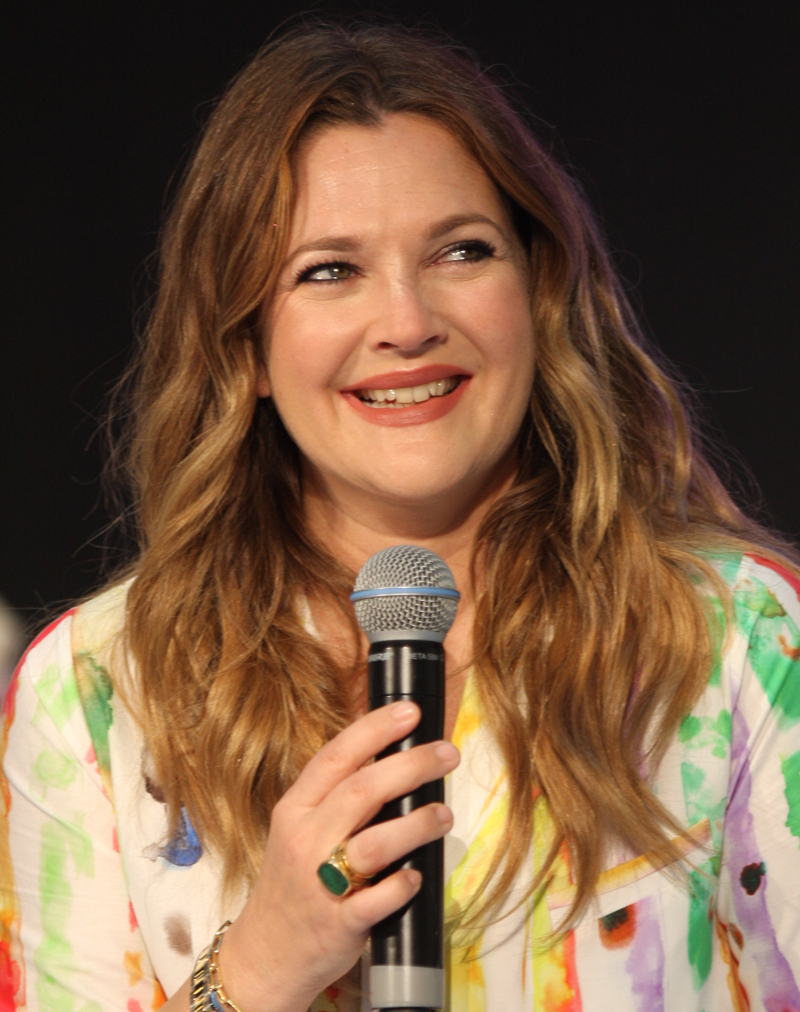
- Barrymore in 2019
- Born: Drew Blyth Barrymore; February 22, 1975 (age 51); Culver City, California, U.S.
- Occupations: Actress; producer; talk show host; businesswoman
- Years active: 1976–present
- Works: Filmography
- Spouses: Jeremy Thomas (m. 1994; div. 1995); Tom Green (m. 2001; div. 2002); Will Kopelman (m. 2012; div. 2016)
- Children: 2
- Father: John Drew Barrymore
- Relatives: John Blyth Barrymore (half-brother)
- Family: Barrymore family; Drew family
- Awards: Full list

Drew Blyth Barrymore (born February 22, 1975) is an American actress. A member of the Barrymore-Drew family of actors, she has received multiple awards and nominations, including a Golden Globe Award, an Emmy Award, and an Actor Award. She was named one of the 100 most influential people in the world by Time in 2023.

Barrymore rose to prominence as a child actor in the 1980s. She made her film debut in Altered States (1980), before achieving wider recognition from her performances in E.T. the Extra-Terrestrial (1982), Firestarter (1984), and Irreconcilable Differences (1984). She emerged as a film star with leading roles in Boys on the Side (1995), The Wedding Singer (1998), Charlie's Angels (2000), Confessions of a Dangerous Mind (2002), Charlie's Angels: Full Throttle (2003), 50 First Dates (2004), Beverly Hills Chihuahua (2008), He's Just Not That Into You (2009), and Blended (2014). Her other film credits include Poison Ivy (1992), Batman Forever (1995), Scream (1996), and Donnie Darko (2001).

On television, Barrymore starred as the titular role in The Amy Fisher Story (1993) and Edith Bouvier Beale in HBO's Grey Gardens (2009), for which she won the Golden Globe Award for Best Actress in a Television Film. She also starred in the Netflix series Santa Clarita Diet (2017–2019) and currently hosts the daytime talk show The Drew Barrymore Show (2020–present).

Barrymore is the founder of the production company Flower Films and has starred in several of its projects. She made her directorial debut with Whip It (2009). She launched a range of cosmetics under the Flower banner in 2013. Her other business ventures include a range of wines, homeware, and clothing. She has released four New York Times bestselling books, including the memoir Little Girl Lost (1990) and the photobook Find It in Everything (2014).

== Early life ==
=== Ancestry ===
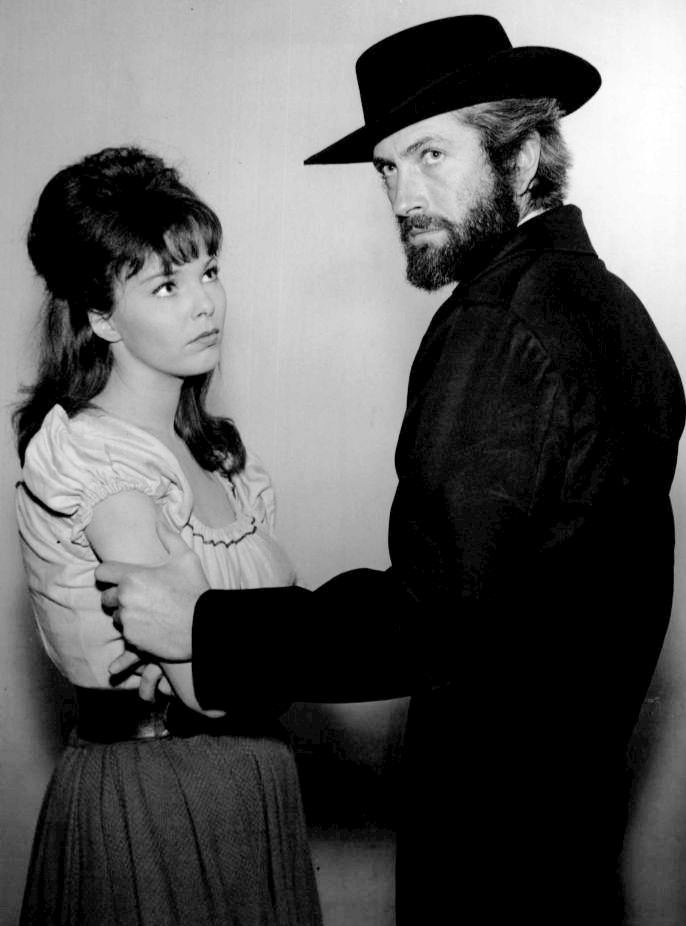
Anne Helm and Drew's father, John Drew Barrymore, in Gunsmoke, 1964

Barrymore was born on February 22, 1975, in Culver City, California, an inner suburb of Los Angeles. Her father was actor John Drew Barrymore. Her mother, Jaid Barrymore was an actor as well. Her mother was born in a displaced persons camp in Brannenburg, West Germany, to Hungarian World War II refugees. Through her father, Barrymore has three older half-siblings, including actor John Blyth Barrymore. Her parents divorced in 1984.

Barrymore was born into an acting family. All of her paternal great-grandparents, Maurice and Georgie Drew Barrymore, Maurice and Mae Costello (née Altschuk), and her paternal grandparents, John Barrymore and Dolores Costello, were actors, with John being arguably the most acclaimed actor of his generation. Barrymore is a niece of Diana Barrymore, a grandniece of Lionel Barrymore, Ethel Barrymore and Helene Costello, and a great-great-granddaughter of Irish-born John and English-born Louisa Lane Drew, all of whom were also actors. She is a great-grandniece of Broadway idol John Drew Jr. and silent film actor, writer and director Sidney Drew.

Barrymore's godmothers are actress Sophia Loren and Lee Strasberg's widow, Anna Strasberg; Barrymore described her relationship with the latter as one that "would become so important to me as a kid because she was so kind and nurturing." Her godfather is filmmaker Steven Spielberg.

Barrymore's first name, Drew, was the maiden name of her paternal great-grandmother Georgie Drew, and her middle name, Blyth, was derived from the birth surname (Blyth) of her great-grandfather who later took the stage name of Maurice Barrymore. In her 1991 autobiography Little Girl Lost, Barrymore recounted early memories of her abusive father, who left the family when she was six months old. She and her father never had a significant relationship and seldom spoke.

=== Childhood ===
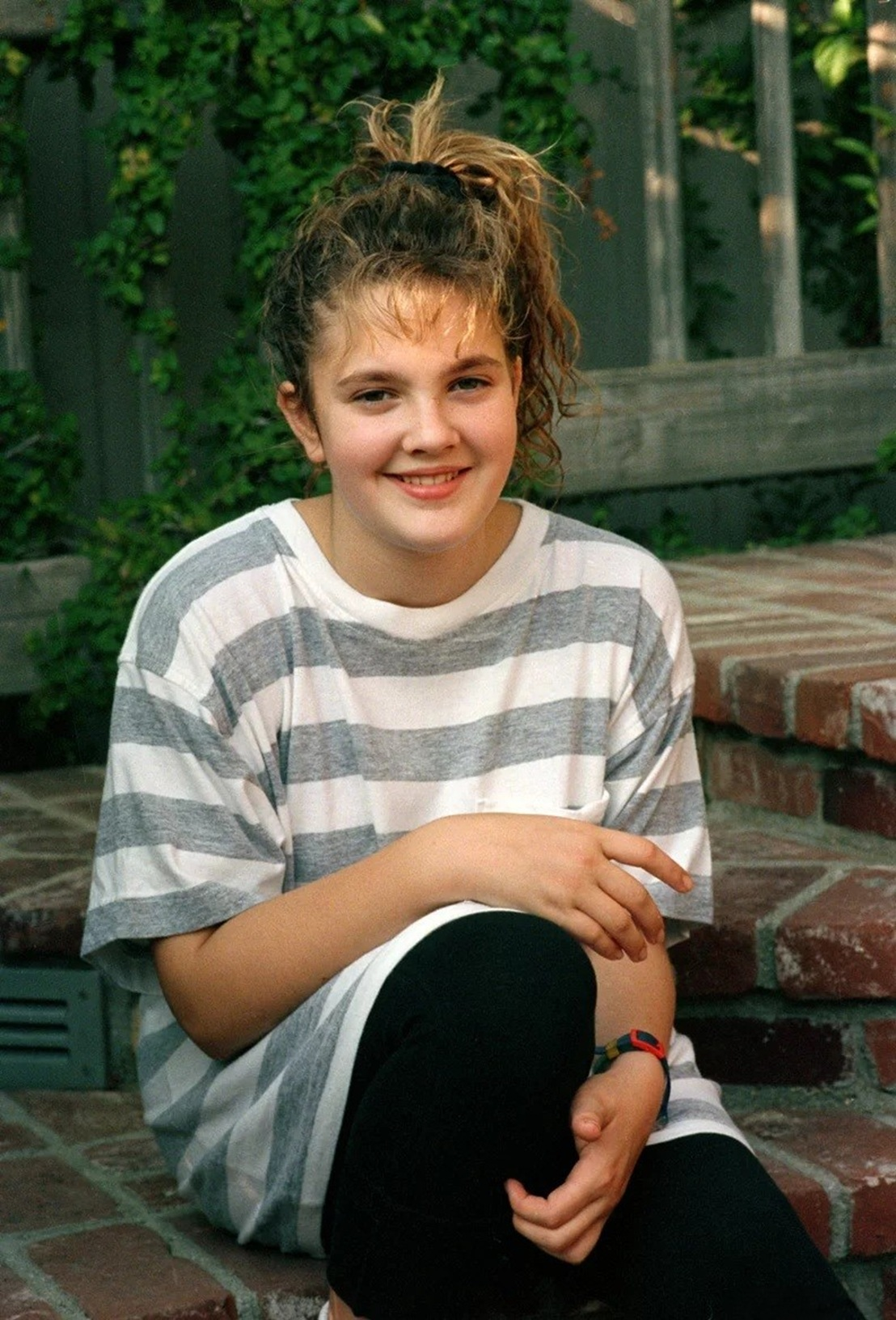
Barrymore in 1987

Barrymore grew up on Poinsettia Place in West Hollywood, until she moved to Sherman Oaks at the age of seven. In her 2015 memoir Wildflower, she says she spoke "like a valley girl" because she grew up in Sherman Oaks. She moved back to West Hollywood on becoming emancipated at age 14. She attended elementary school at Fountain Day School in West Hollywood and Country School. In the wake of her sudden stardom, Barrymore endured a notoriously troubled childhood. She was a regular at Studio 54 as a young girl, and her nightlife and constant partying became a popular subject with the media.

She was placed in rehab at thirteen, and spent eighteen months at Van Nuys Behavioral Health Hospital, an institution for the mentally ill. A suicide attempt at age fourteen put her back in rehab, followed by a three-month stay with singer David Crosby and his wife. The stay was precipitated, Crosby said, because she "needed to be around some people that were committed to sobriety." Barrymore described this period of her life for Little Girl Lost. After a successful juvenile court petition for emancipation, she moved into her own apartment at the age of fifteen.

== Career ==
=== Early roles and breakthrough as a child actor (1980s) ===
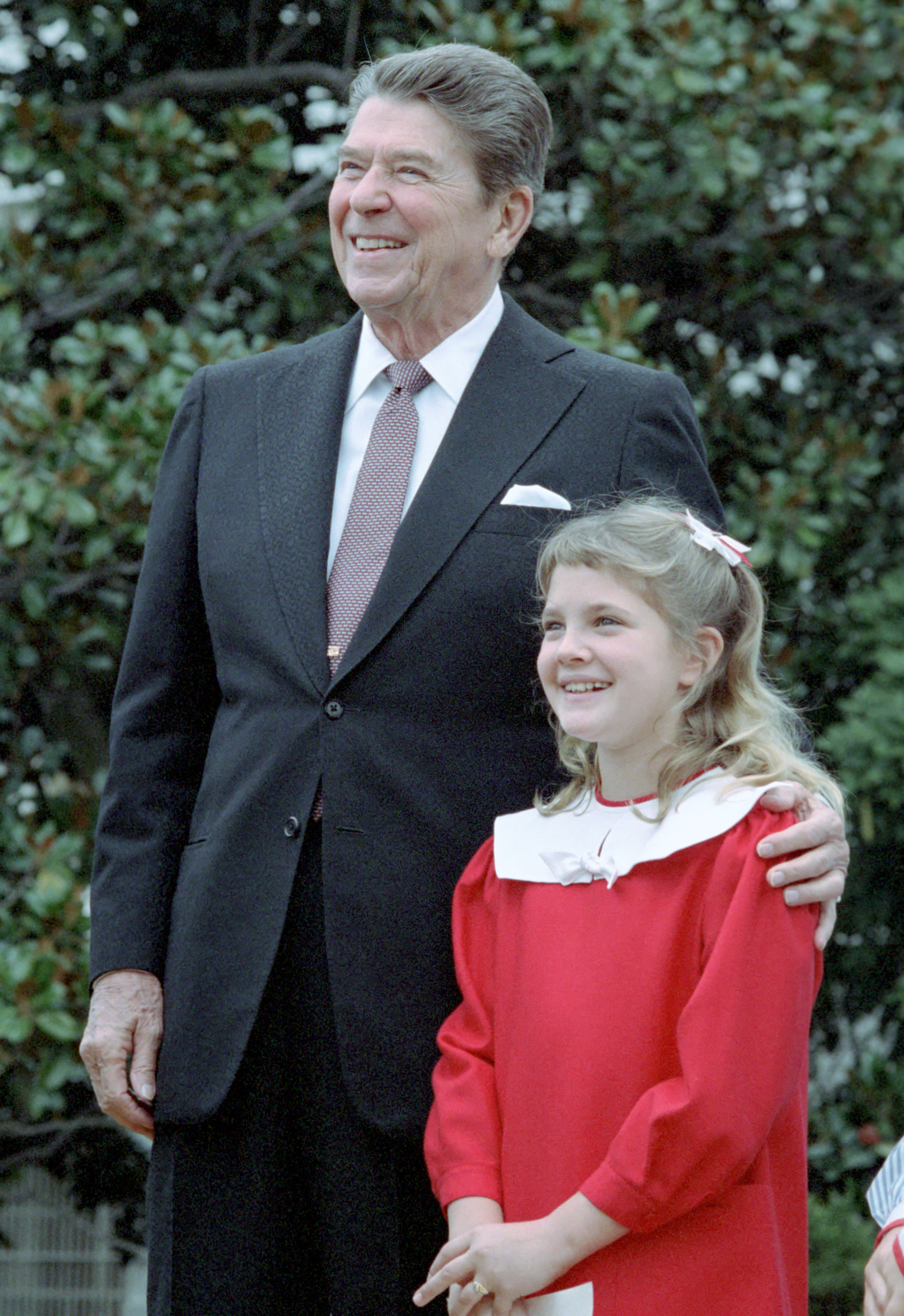
Barrymore and Ronald Reagan in 1984

Barrymore appeared in a dog food commercial when she was eleven months old. After her film debut with a small role in Altered States, she played Gertie in E.T. the Extra-Terrestrial. Director Steven Spielberg felt she had the right imagination for the role after she impressed him with a story that she led a punk rock band. E.T. was the highest-grossing film of the 1980s and made Barrymore one of the most famous child actors of the time. She won the Young Artist Award for Best Young Supporting Actress and was nominated for the Rising Star Award at the British Academy Film Awards. In the eighth season of Saturday Night Live, she became the youngest person to guest-host the series at 7 years old. Barrymore said that "nobody treated me like a kid there" and she felt no different than any other cast member despite her age.

In the 1984 film adaptation of Stephen King's 1980 novel Firestarter, Barrymore played a girl with pyrokinesis, and the target of a secret government agency known as The Shop. That year, she also played a young girl divorcing her famous parents in Irreconcilable Differences and was nominated for her first Golden Globe Award for Best Supporting Actress. In his review in the Chicago Sun-Times, Roger Ebert wrote: "Barrymore is the right actress for this role precisely because she approaches it with such grave calm." She starred in the anthology horror film Cat's Eye, also written by King. It received positive reviews and Barrymore was nominated for a Young Artist Award for Best Leading Young Actress.

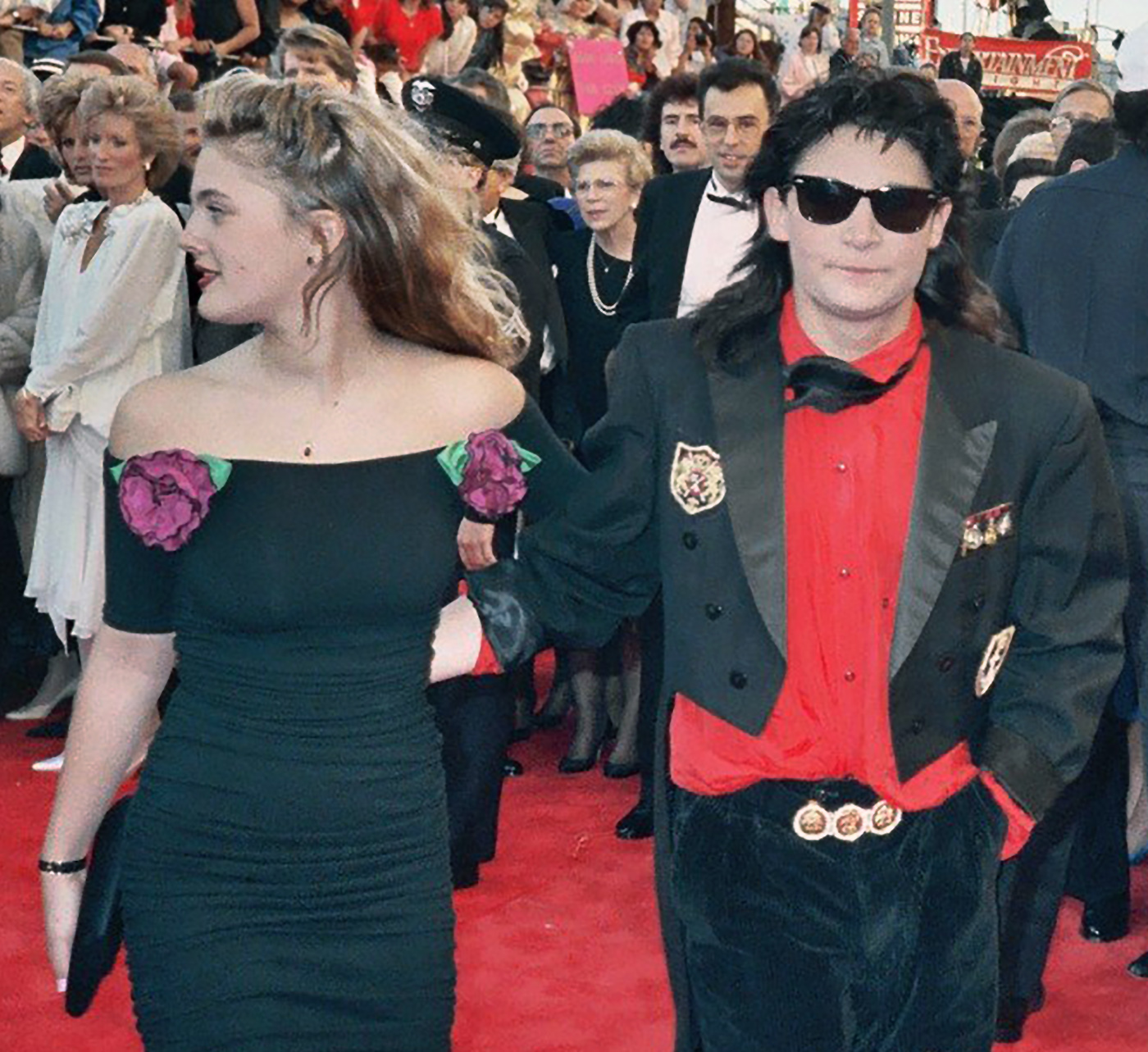
Barrymore and Corey Feldman at the 61st Academy Awards in 1989

Barrymore experienced a troubled youth and acted only intermittently throughout the late 1980s. She next starred in the 1989 romance film See You in the Morning. Vincent Canby of The New York Times criticized the "fashionable phoniness" of the film, but positively singled out Barrymore. In Far from Home, she played a teenager who gets stranded with her father in a small, remote desert town. The film went largely unnoticed by audiences and received negative reviews from critics, who dismissed the sexual portrayal of her role.

=== Teenage stardom (1990s) ===
Barrymore's rebelliousness played itself out on screen and in print. She played a poor teenage girl in Poison Ivy (1992), which was a box-office bomb, but was popular on video and cable. Her character Ivy was ranked at #6 on the list of the top 26 "bad girls" of all time by Entertainment Weekly. Barrymore was 17 when she posed nude with her then-fiancé, actor Jamie Walters, for the cover of the July issue of Interview magazine; she also appeared nude in pictures inside the issue.

In Guncrazy, Barrymore played a teenager who kills her abusive stepfather. Variety remarked that she "pulls [her character] off impressively", and Barrymore was nominated for the Golden Globe Award for Best Actress in a Miniseries or Television Film. She played the younger sister of a murdered ballerina in No Place to Hide (1993) and a writer followed by what is apparently her evil twin in Doppelganger. Both films were panned by critics and failed to find an audience. She appeared in the western film Bad Girls (1994), which follows four former prostitutes on the run following a justifiable homicide and prison escape. Roger Ebert, in his review for the film, wrote for Chicago Sun-Times: "What a good idea, to make a Western about four tough women. And what a sad movie."

Barrymore posed nude for the January 1995 issue of Playboy. Soon after, her godfather Steven Spielberg gave her a quilt for her 20th birthday with a note that read, "Cover yourself up." Enclosed in the quilt were copies of her Playboy pictures which had been altered by Spielberg's art department so that she appeared fully clothed. Barrymore later said that she would not let her own child make the same choice she did.

While appearing on the Late Show with David Letterman, Barrymore climbed onto the desk, flashed her breasts to David Letterman and gave him a kiss on the cheek as a birthday gift. She modeled in a series of Guess? jeans ads during this time. In the late 1990s, Barrymore re-established her image and continued to be a highly bankable star.

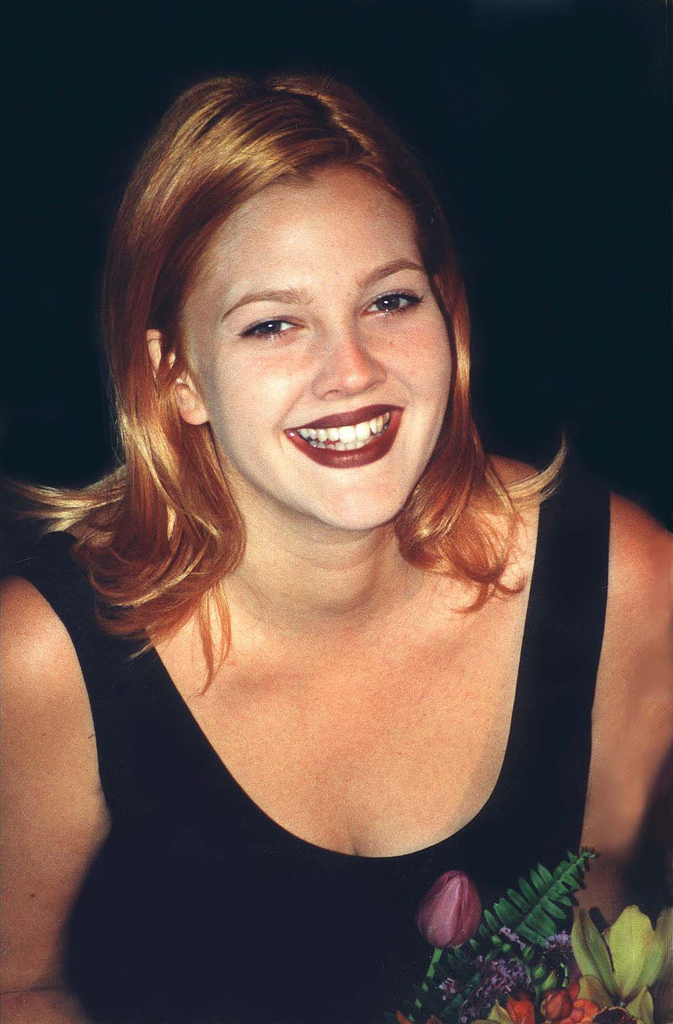
Barrymore in 1997

In Boys on the Side (1995), Barrymore played a pregnant girl attempting to escape from her abusive boyfriend. It was a box office success and was positively received by critics. In the superhero film Batman Forever, she played one of the two female assistants for Two-Face (Tommy Lee Jones).

Barrymore had a small role in Wes Craven's slasher film Scream (1996). She read the film's script and was interested in being involved, approaching the production team herself to request a role. The producers were quick to take advantage of her unexpected interest and signed her to play the lead role of Sidney Prescott. However, after unexpected commitments, Barrymore played Casey Becker in a minor role and Neve Campbell took the leading one. Scream was released to critical acclaim and made $173 million worldwide. She was nominated for the Saturn Award for Best Supporting Actress.

In The Wedding Singer (1998), Barrymore played a waitress in love with the titular character, played by Adam Sandler. Variety found the film to be a "spirited, funny and warm saga" that serves them up "in a new way that enhances their most winning qualities". Budgeted at $18 million, the film grossed $123.3 million internationally. In Home Fries (1998), Barrymore played a pregnant woman unknowingly falling for the stepson of the late father of her baby. She starred in the historical drama film Ever After (1998), which made $98 million and was inspired by the fairy tale Cinderella. Roger Ebert said about Barrymore and the film: "she can hold the screen and involve us in her characters".

Barrymore voiced the titular anthropomorphic Jack Russell Terrier in the Christmas television film Olive, the Other Reindeer (1999) and was nominated for a Primetime Emmy Award. After establishing Flower Films, Barrymore and Nancy Juvonen produced the company's first film, Never Been Kissed, in which Barrymore played an insecure copy editor for the Chicago Sun-Times and a high school student. While reviews from critics were mixed, CNN noted: "There are two words which describe why this film works: Drew Barrymore. Her comedic timing and willingness to go all out in her quest for a laugh combine to make Never Been Kissed a gratifying movie-going experience". The film was a commercial success, grossing $84.5 million.

=== Adult stardom and directorial debut (2000s) ===
In Charlie's Angels (2000), Barrymore, Cameron Diaz, and Lucy Liu played the trio of investigators in Los Angeles. The film was a major box office success and helped solidify Barrymore's standing in her production company as one of the film's producers. Barrymore starred in Riding in Cars with Boys (2001) as a teenage mother in a failed marriage with the drug-addicted father (based on Beverly Donofrio's real-life story). When the production of Donnie Darko was threatened, Barrymore stepped forward with financing from the company and played the title character's English teacher. Although the film was less than successful at the box office in the wake of 9/11, it reached cult status after the DVD release, inspiring numerous websites devoted to unraveling the plot twists and meanings.

Barrymore starred in George Clooney's directorial debut Confessions of a Dangerous Mind (2002), based on the autobiography of television producer Chuck Barris. Barrymore reprised her role in Charlie's Angels: Full Throttle (2003) and starred with Ben Stiller in Duplex. Flower Films and Happy Madison Productions produced the film 50 First Dates (2004), in which Barrymore played an amnesiac woman and Sandler played a marine veterinarian. Summing up Barrymore's appeal, Roger Ebert, in his review for the film, remarked that Barrymore displayed a "smiling, coy sincerity", in what he described as an "ingratiating and lovable" film. 50 First Dates was a commercial success; it made US$120.9 million in North America and US$196.4 million worldwide.

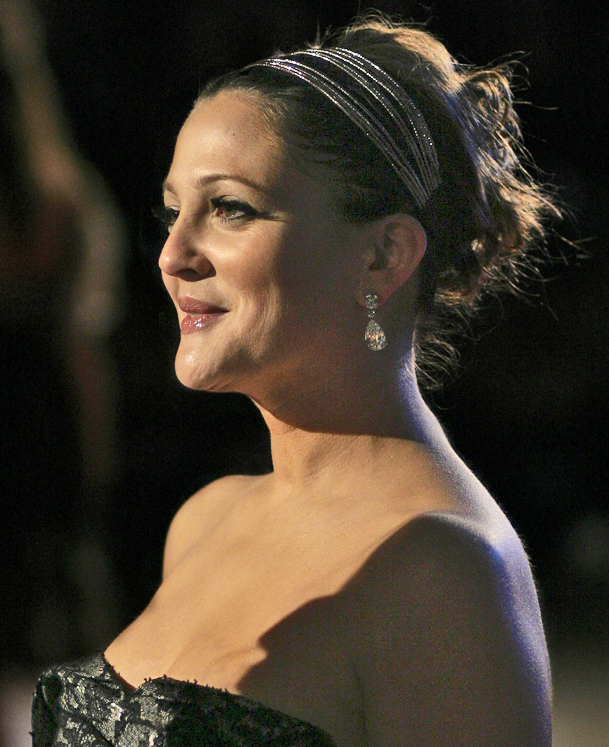
Barrymore at the premiere for Music & Lyrics in 2007

In the 2005 American remake adaptation of the 1997 British film Fever Pitch, Barrymore played the love interest of an immature schoolteacher (Jimmy Fallon). The film grossed a modest US$50 million worldwide and had generally favorable reviews by critics who felt it "has enough charm and on-screen chemistry between [Fallon and Barrymore] to make it a solid hit". Barrymore starred in the 2006 animated film Curious George, based on the book series of the same name. She and Hugh Grant starred in Music and Lyrics (2007), which focuses on the relationship that evolves between a former pop music idol and an aspiring writer as they struggle to compose a song for a reigning pop diva. The romantic comedy, released in February 2007, received largely positive reviews, with The Washington Post finding the two to be "great together" in it. The film was a commercial success, grossing US$145 million globally.

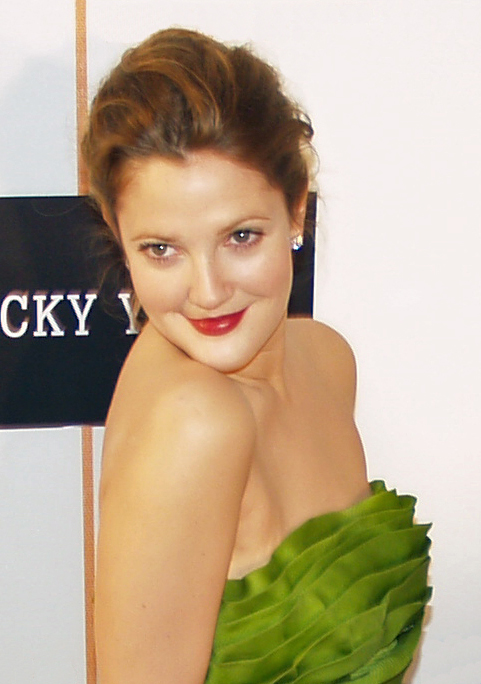
Barrymore at the premiere for Lucky You in 2007

In Curtis Hanson's poker film Lucky You, Barrymore played an aspiring singer and the subject of the affections of a talented player. In Raja Gosnell's film Beverly Hills Chihuahua (2008), Barrymore voiced the titular character, a richly pampered pet who gets dognapped in Mexico and attempts to avoid the Dobermann.

Barrymore starred in the ensemble romantic comedy He's Just Not That Into You (2009), which received mixed reviews, partly due to her limited time on screen, while it grossed US$178 million worldwide. She played Edith Bouvier Beale, the daughter of Edith Ewing Bouvier Beale (Jessica Lange) in the HBO film Grey Gardens, which is based on the 1975 documentary film. The television film was a huge success, winning five Primetime Emmy Awards and two Golden Globe Awards. Rolling Stone writer Peter Travers found Barrymore to be a "revelation" in her role. Barrymore was nominated for the Emmy Award for Outstanding Lead Actress in a Miniseries or a Movie and won the Golden Globe Award for Best Actress – Miniseries or Television Film and the Screen Actors Guild for Outstanding Performance by a Female Actor in a Television Movie or Miniseries.

Barrymore starred in her directorial debut film Whip It. It follows a high-schooler (Elliot Page) ditching the teen beauty pageant scene and participating in an Austin roller derby league. Barrymore worked with screenwriter Shauna Cross for months on script revisions, with Barrymore pushing her to "avoid her story's tidier prospects, to make things 'more raw and open ended'". While the film found limited box office receipts, it was favorably received; according to review aggregation website Rotten Tomatoes, critics agreed that her "directorial debut has enough charm, energy, and good-natured humor to transcend its many cliches". For her venture, Barrymore garnered nominations for a Bronze Horse at the Stockholm Film Festival and for the EDA Female Focus Award at the 2009 Alliance of Women Film Journalists. In Everybody's Fine, Barrymore played the daughter of a recently widowed retiree (Robert De Niro). The drama flopped at the box office, but Stephen Holden for The New York Times considered Barrymore "as ingenuous as ever" in what he described as a "small role".

=== Continued screen work (2010s) ===
Barrymore starred with Justin Long in Nanette Burstein's film Going the Distance (2010). It follows a couple dealing the ups and downs of a long-distance relationship, while commuting between New York City and San Francisco. It garnered generally mixed reviews by critics, who summed it as "timelier and a little more honest than most romantic comedies", and budgeted at US$32 million, the film made US$40 million at the worldwide box office.

On August 2, 2011, Barrymore directed the music video for the song "Our Deal", for the band Best Coast, which features Chloë Grace Moretz, Miranda Cosgrove, Tyler Posey, Donald Glover, Shailene Woodley, and Alia Shawkat. Barrymore starred in the biopic film Big Miracle (2012), which covers Operation Breakthrough, the 1988 international effort to rescue gray whales from being trapped in ice near Point Barrow, Alaska. Her character, Rachel Kramer, is based on Greenpeace activist Cindy Lowry. Despite a positive critical reception, the film flopped at the box office.

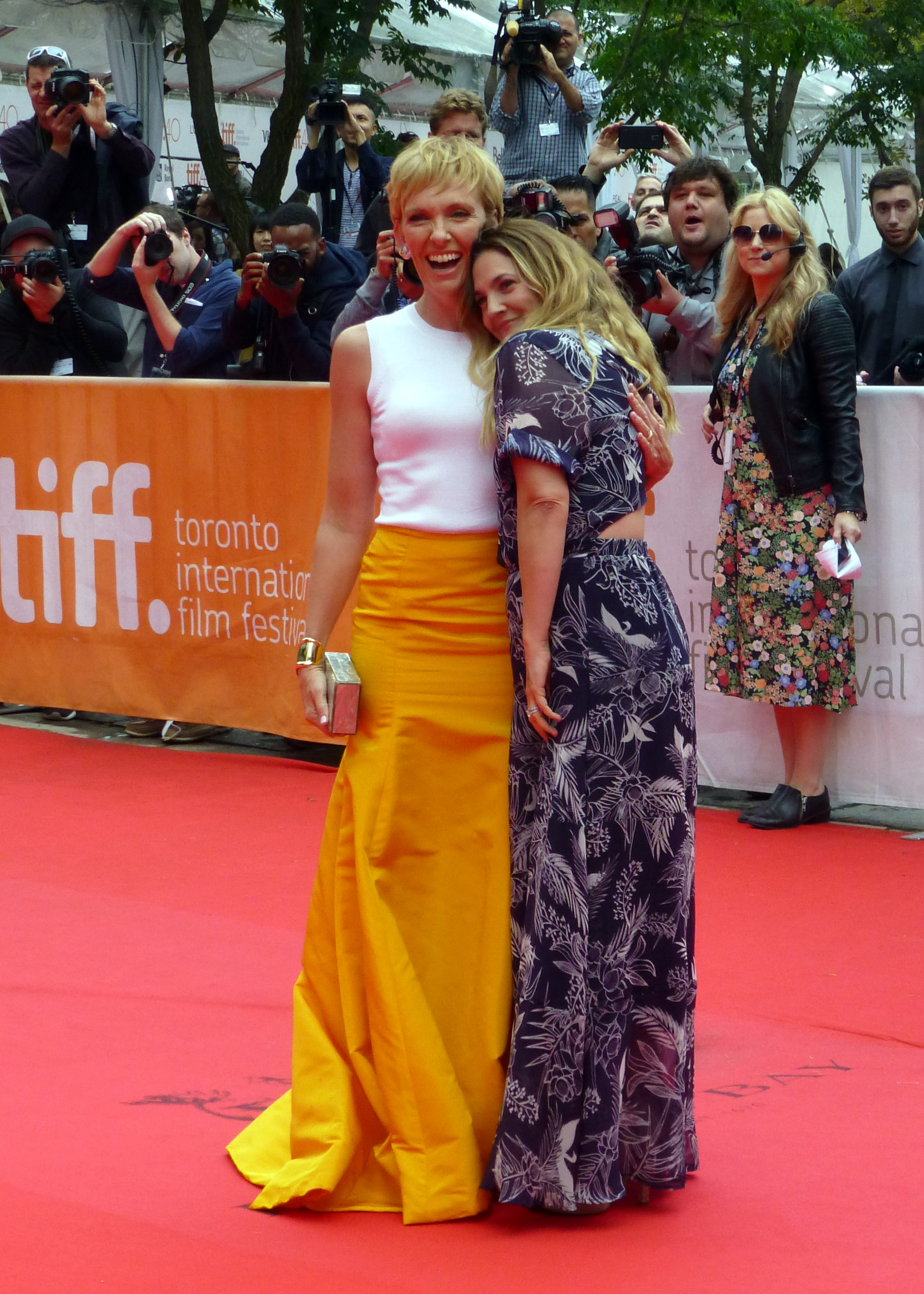
Toni Collette and Barrymore at the premiere for Miss You Already at the 2015 Toronto International Film Festival

In Blended (2014), Barrymore played a recently divorced woman ending up on a family resort with a widower (Sandler). Film critic James Berardinelli dismissed the "hit-and-miss humor" of the story and wrote that "as [Sandler and Barrymore] are concerned, the third time is definitely not the charm", as part of an overall lukewarm critical response. The film ultimately grossed US$128 million worldwide. She and Toni Collette starred in Miss You Already (2015), as two long-time friends whose relationship is put to the test when one starts a family and the other becomes ill. Reviewers embraced the film, while it received a limited theatrical release.

In the Netflix original television series Santa Clarita Diet (2017–2019), Barrymore played a real estate agent who, after experiencing a physical transformation into a zombie, starts craving human flesh. Along with co-star Timothy Olyphant, Barrymore served as an executive producer on the single-camera series, which was favorably received upon its premiere; Rolling Stone felt that "much of [the series' laughs] comes down to the uncrushable Drew Barrymore charm" and furthermore remarked: "The show is a welcome comeback for Barrymore, the eternally beloved grunge-era wild thing—it's not just her big move into TV, but her first high-profile performance anywhere in years. In a way, it circles back to the roles she was doing in the early [90s], playing deadly vixens in flicks like Guncrazy or Doppelganger".

=== Television focus and The Drew Barrymore Show (2020s) ===
Barrymore starred in Jamie Babbit's film The Stand In (2020). It was set to premiere at the Tribeca Film Festival in April 2020, but the festival was cancelled due to the COVID-19 pandemic. On September 14, 2020, Barrymore launched a syndicated daytime talk show, The Drew Barrymore Show. On December 4, 2020, she appeared as a guest star on Martha Knows Best. On March 11, 2021, Barrymore said she was taking an indefinite hiatus from acting. She wrote a cookbook with chef Pilar Valdes entitled Rebel Homemaker (2021), which was a New York Times bestseller. In June 2021, she launched Drew Magazine, a quarterly released lifestyle magazine by publisher Bauer Media USA. Barrymore was named one of the 100 most influential people in the world by Time magazine in 2023.

In September 2023, Barrymore announced she would continue her syndicated TV talk show despite the ongoing WGA strike, writing, "I own this choice", when explaining her reasoning via social media. While SAG had stated that as the host of the show she was not under any obligation to strike, her show continued without unionized writing staff. Audience members showing support for the Writer's Guild were kicked out of the studio and had any WGA pins confiscated. Due to these events, the National Book Foundation removed Barrymore from being the host of the then upcoming 74th National Book Awards. Barrymore apologized for her actions later that week in a video on Instagram, claiming that "I believe there's nothing I can do or say in this moment to make it OK." Barrymore deleted the apology video from her account following criticism. On the 17th, Barrymore announced on her Instagram account that she would be postponing production of her talk show until the strike ends due to the backlash, writing, "I have listened to everyone, and I am making the decision to pause the show's premiere until the strike is over". She also added, "I have no words to express my deepest apologies to anyone I have hurt, and, of course, to our incredible team who works on the show and has made it what it is today". A spokesperson for CBS Media Ventures said, "We support Drew's decision to pause the show's return and understand how complex and difficult this process has been for her."

In May 2024, it was announced that Hollywood Squares would be revived by CBS, with Barrymore as a co-executive producer and center square, and Nate Burleson as host. The series premiered on January 16, 2025. On February 24, 2025, the revival was renewed for a second season.

== Public image ==
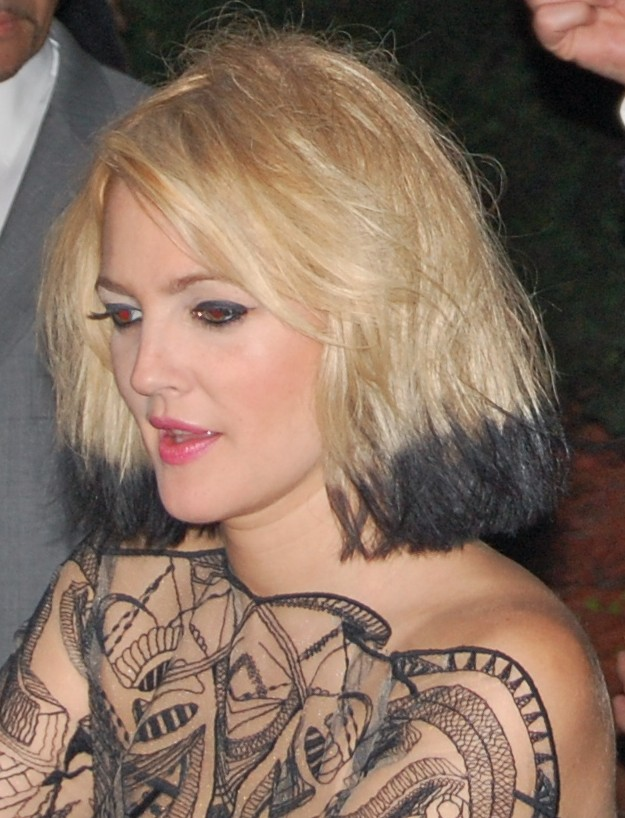
Barrymore at the premiere for Whip It at the 2009 Toronto International Film Festival

Barrymore became a CoverGirl Cosmetics' model and spokeswoman in 2007. In February 2015, she became one of the faces of CoverGirl, alongside Queen Latifah and Taylor Swift. The company partnered with her because, according to vice president and general manager Esi Eggleston Bracey, "she emulates the iconic image of CoverGirl with her fresh, natural beauty and energetic yet authentic spirit". She also helped create the ads. She was No. 1 on People's annual 100 Most Beautiful People list in 2007. She was named the new face for the Gucci jewelry line.

In May 2007, Barrymore was named Ambassador Against Hunger for the United Nations World Food Programme and later donated $1 million to the cause. As a guest photographer for a Time Out magazine series called "They Shoot New York", she appeared on the cover holding a Pentax K1000 film camera. She expressed hopes of exposing her work in a gallery one day, as she had documented the most recent decade of her life with a Pentax camera.

Barrymore launched a women's fashion line in fall 2017 in conjunction with Amazon.com called Dear Drew, which featured a pop-up shop in New York City that opened in November. She became the Chief Gifting Officer for Etsy in January 2024.

== Personal life ==
Barrymore practices meditation and is a longtime supporter of St. Jude Children's Research Hospital.

In a 2003 interview with New Woman magazine, Barrymore said: "Do I like women sexually? Yeah, I do. Totally. I have always considered myself bisexual. I love a woman's body. I think a woman and a woman together are beautiful, just as a man and a woman together are beautiful. Being with a woman is like exploring your own body, but through someone else". She added "I don't think I could ever just solely be with a woman ... It's just not enough for me."

Barrymore is the godmother of Frances Bean Cobain, the daughter of Kurt Cobain and Courtney Love.

Barrymore eats a plant-based diet, and reportedly convinced Cardi B to try veganism.

=== Relationships ===
At 16, Barrymore was briefly engaged to 25-year-old Leland Hayward, III, the grandson of producer Leland Hayward, in 1991.

At 17, Barrymore began a relationship with 23-year-old Jamie Walters that lasted from 1992 to 1993. He proposed to her with a diamond ring in a 1967 Chevrolet Chevelle and planned to marry in spring of 1993. Walters and Barrymore have tattoos of the other's name; Walters has her name in a cross on his upper right shoulder blade and Barrymore has his name, along with her mother's name, in a banner flown by a cherub on her lower back. In 2023, Barrymore spoke positively of Walters while interviewing Tori Spelling on her talk show. (Spelling had played Walters' love interest on Beverly Hills, 90210.)

In early 1994, at 19, Barrymore began dating 31-year-old Jeremy Thomas, a US-based business owner from Wales. Thomas had been allowing Barrymore to drink at The Room, his Los Angeles bar on Cahuenga Boulevard, even though she was underage and had already been receiving treatment for alcoholism on and off for several years. On March 20, 1994, after six weeks of dating, the two impulsively married at around 5:30 am at The Room, paying a 24-hour minister to perform the ceremony. Barrymore wore a white slip dress and combat boots. Barrymore and Thomas separated 19 days later and she filed for divorce less than two months after that, alleging that Thomas had married her for her wealth and a green card. Their divorce was finalized in 1995. In an interview later that year, Barrymore told Rolling Stone that Thomas was "the Devil".

In late 1994, Barrymore began dating Hole guitarist Eric Erlandson. Barrymore began dating MTV host and comedian Tom Green in 1999. They were engaged in July 2000 and married a year later. Together, they starred in Charlie's Angels and Green's directorial film debut, Freddy Got Fingered. Green filed for divorce in December 2001; it was finalized on October 15, 2002.

In 2002, Barrymore began dating the Strokes drummer Fabrizio Moretti, whom she had recently met at a concert. Their relationship ended in January 2007. She then began dating Justin Long, and although they broke up in July 2008, they were intermittently romantically involved until 2010, when they co-starred in the film Going The Distance.

In February 2011, Barrymore began dating Will Kopelman, an art consultant and the son of Arie L. Kopelman, who had once been chief operating officer of the French fashion house Chanel. Kopelman proposed to Barrymore in Sun Valley, Idaho in December of that year, while the two were on a Christmas vacation, and media outlets reported on their engagement in January 2012. They married on June 2, 2012, in a garden-themed Jewish ceremony at her home in Montecito, California; Barrymore wore a Chanel wedding gown. Barrymore gave birth to their first child three months later, and to their second child in 2014.

During her marriage to Kopelman, Barrymore expressed an interest in converting to Judaism, his faith, calling it "beautiful", but never finalized the process. Barrymore announced her separation from Kopelman on April 2, 2016. They filed for divorce on July 15 and it was finalized on August 3. In 2020, Barrymore told People she would never get married again. Kopelman married Vogue director Alexandra "Allie" Michler in 2021 and Barrymore has spoken positively of her relationship with Michler, saying she is a wonderful stepmother. Barrymore moved to Manhattan in 2023 so that her children could be closer to Kopelman.

== Acting credits and accolades ==
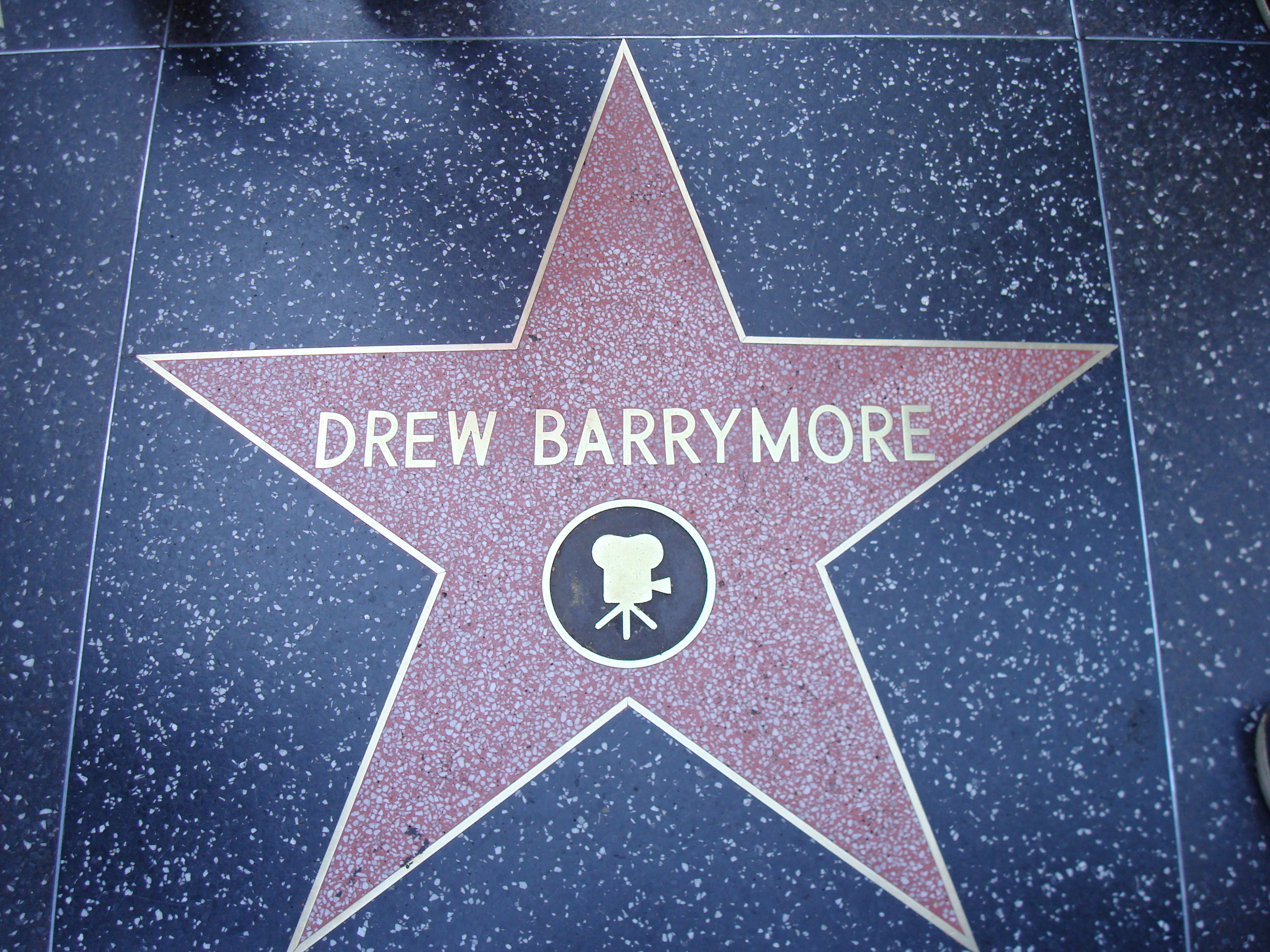
Barrymore's star on the Hollywood Walk of Fame

Barrymore's films compiled a worldwide box office gross that stood at over US$2.3 billion. According to The Hollywood Reporter's annual Star Salary Top 10, she was tied for eighth place on the top ten list of actresses' salaries, commanding 10 to 12 million dollars per film in 2006.

Barrymore became the youngest person to host Saturday Night Live, having hosted on November 20, 1982, at seven years of age, a record that remains unbroken as of 2026. On February 3, 2007, Barrymore hosted SNL for the fifth time, becoming the second female host (after Candice Bergen) in the show's history to do so. She hosted again on October 10, 2009, becoming the first woman to host six times.

In 1999, Barrymore was honored by the Young Artist Foundation with its Former Child Star "Lifetime Achievement" Award commemorating her outstanding achievements within the film industry as a child actress. For her contributions to the film industry, she received a motion pictures star on the Hollywood Walk of Fame in 2004. It is located at 6925 Hollywood Boulevard.

== Bibliography ==
Following a highly publicized childhood marked by drug and alcohol abuse, she released an autobiography, Little Girl Lost, which became a New York Times best seller. E. P. Dutton published a collection of Barrymore's autobiographical essays in her book Wildflower in 2015, for which she also narrated the audiobook version; it was also a bestseller.

- Barrymore, Drew. Little Girl Lost. Pocket Books, 1990. ISBN 0-671-68923-1
- Barrymore, Drew. Find It in Everything. Little, Brown and Company, 2014. ISBN 0-316-25906-3
- Barrymore, Drew. Wildflower. Dutton, 2015. ISBN 1-101-98381-7
- Barrymore, Drew and Valdes, Pilar. Rebel Homemaker: Food, Family, Life. Dutton, 2021. ISBN 0-593-18410-6

== See also ==
- List of celebrities who own wineries and vineyards
