= Martha Knows Best =

2020 American reality television series

- Genre: Reality television
- Created by: Martha Stewart
- Starring: Martha Stewart; Kevin Sharkey; Ryan McCallister
- Country of origin: United States
- Original language: English
- No. of seasons: 2
- No. of episodes: 14

Production
- Executive producers: Martha Stewart; Dan Cesareo; Lucilla D'Agostino; Taylor Lucy Choi; Kim Miller Olko; Jordana Starr; Meghan Spielberg
- Producers: Rob Vonnes; Scott Kolbicz
- Production location: Bedford, New York
- Cinematography: Brett Albright
- Editors: Courtney Sommers; Sean Gill; Ben Milner; Doug Garvey; Eric Koyanagi; Amir Minder
- Running time: 22 minutes
- Production companies: HGTV; Big Fish Entertainment; MGM

Original release
- Network: HGTV
- Release: July 31 – December 4, 2020

Martha Knows Best is an American reality television series that aired on HGTV from July 31 to December 4, 2020. Filmed during the COVID-19 pandemic, it followed Martha Stewart at her Bedford, New York farm as she completed gardening and other household projects, surprised fans, and dispensed domestic advice to her celebrity friends. Its second season focused on autumn and winter holiday projects.

== Guest stars ==
- Drew Barrymore
- Lorraine Bracco
- Lauren Conrad
- Jamie Lee Curtis
- Snoop Dogg
- Richard Gere
- Chelsea Handler
- Derek Hough
- Kate Hudson
- Ice-T
- DJ Khaled
- Hoda Kotb
- Denis Leary
- Jay Leno
- Post Malone
- Lupita Nyong'o
- Leslie Odom Jr.
- Antoni Porowski

== Awards and nominations ==
Martha Knows Best was nominated for "Best Lifestyle: Home/Garden Show" at the 3rd Critics' Choice Real TV Awards.

== Continuation ==
In a slightly altered format, a continuation of the program began airing in July 2021 on Discovery+ as Martha Gets Down and Dirty.
