= Logan Arens =

American actor (born 1996)

- Born: September 26, 1996 (age 29); Springfield, Vermont, U.S.
- Occupation: Actor
- Years active: 2001–present
- Family: Cody Arens (brother)

Logan Arens is an American actor. He is the brother of Cody Arens and Skye Arens. He is most notable for the voice of Littlefoot in The Land Before Time XIII: The Wisdom of Friends and as the roles of Jeremy, on The Education of Max Bickford and Chris on My Wife and Kids.

== Career ==
Arens made his debut in Riding in Cars with Boys as Jason (age 3). Besides his most noted roles, he also played Arnie Davis in the TV movie Love's Enduring Promise, which was released in the United States on November 20, 2004. He also had a minor role in Happy Feet in 2006.

== Filmography ==
Year	Title	Role	Notes
2001	Riding in Cars with Boys	Jason - Age 3	
2002	The Education of Max Bickford	Jeremy	Episode: Money Changes Everything
2002	My Wife and Kids	Chris	Episode: Crouching Mother, Hidden Father
2004	Love's Enduring Promise	Arnie Davis	TV movie
2006	Hidden Places	Luke Wyatt	TV movie
2006	Happy Feet		Voice
2007	The Land Before Time XIII: The Wisdom of Friends	Littlefoot	Voice
2008	Childrens Hospital	Dizzy Boy	Episode: This Kid's Getting a Vasectomy
2011	House	Gabe	Episode: Two Stories
