= Meghan Strange =

American actress

- Born: United States
- Occupation: Actress
- Years active: 1994–present

External image
- Meghan Strange IMDb photo

Meghan Strange is an American actress. She is best known for her roles as Ruby from The Land Before Time television series and Robin from Sofia the First. She also voiced the character Harley Quinn on Batman: The Brave and the Bold and has appeared in a number of short films and children's TV shows.

== Career ==
Strange began her acting career as a member of a chorus line in the 1994 Woody Allen film Bullets Over Broadway. She would later make an appearance as the character Marcy on a January 1999 episode of the soap opera As the World Turns, as well as the 1999 films Entropy and 30 Days.

In 2007, she landed a recurring role as Ruby on the Cartoon Network series The Land Before Time, based on the long-running film series, appearing in every episode as well as the direct-to-video film The Land Before Time XIV: Journey of the Brave. She also voiced Penny on the English version of the Disney Channel series Stitch! between 2008 and 2010. Strange would work for several Disney Junior programs such as Special Agent Oso (as Paw Pilot), Doc McStuffins (as Anna), and Sofia the First (as Robin). In Batman: The Brave and the Bold, she provided the voice for the villain Harley Quinn. Strange would also appear in a 2013 episode of the thriller series Criminal Minds as Catherine Hatchitt.

== Filmography ==
=== Films ===
Year	Title	Role	Notes
1994	Bullets Over Broadway	Three Deuces Chorus Line	
1999	Entropy	Blind Date #4	
1999	30 Days	Maria	
2009	Heidi 4 Paws	Heidi	Voice
2011	Lucky	Woman Eating Celery Sticks	
2012	Sofia the First: Once Upon a Princess	Robin	Voice
2014	A Good Deed	Nurse	Short film
2014	E.D.N.O.R.A.	E.D.N.O.R.A.	Short film
2015	Sister	Nursing Home Volunteer	Short film
2016	The Land Before Time XIV: Journey of the Brave	Ruby, Ducky's Mom	Voice

=== Television ===
Year	Title	Role	Notes
1999	As the World Turns	Marcy	Episode aired January 18, 1999
2007	Higglytown Heroes	Camp Counselor Hero	Voice, episode: "Happy Campers"
2007–2008	The Land Before Time	Ruby, additional voices	Voice, recurring role
2008–2010	Stitch!	Penny (Piko)	9 episodes, English dub
2009–2012	Special Agent Oso	Paw Pilot	Voice, main cast
2010	Batman: The Brave and the Bold	Harley Quinn	Voice, 2 episodes
2010	Freckle and Bean	Andrea	
2012	Doc McStuffins	Anna	Voice, episode: "Anna Split"
2012	iCarly	Bitty Sam	Episode: "iBust a Thief"
2012–2013	Rachel & the TreeSchoolers	Penny	3 episodes
2013	Criminal Minds	Catherine Hatchitt	Episode: "Brothers Hotchner"
2013–2014	The Lil' Sam & Cat Show	Lil' Sam	
2013–2015	Sofia the First	Robin	Voice
2016–2019	The Lion Guard	Laini, Shupavu, Kinyonga, Astuto	Voice, recurring role
