= Riding in Cars with Boys =

2001 film by Penny Marshall

- Theatrical release poster
- Directed by: Penny Marshall
- Screenplay by: Morgan Upton Ward
- Based on: Riding in Cars with Boys by Beverly Donofrio
- Produced by: James L. Brooks; Laurence Mark; Sara Colleton; Richard Sakai; Julie Ansell
- Starring: Drew Barrymore; Steve Zahn; Brittany Murphy; Adam Garcia; Lorraine Bracco; James Woods
- Cinematography: Miroslav Ondříček
- Edited by: Richard Marks
- Music by: Hans Zimmer; Heitor Pereira
- Production companies: Columbia Pictures; Gracie Films
- Distributed by: Sony Pictures Releasing
- Release date: October 19, 2001
- Running time: 132 minutes
- Country: United States
- Language: English
- Budget: $47 million
- Box office: $35.7 million

Riding in Cars with Boys is a 2001 American biographical comedy-drama film based on the autobiography of the same name by Beverly Donofrio, a young teenager who overcame difficulties, including being a young mother, wife and student, later earning a master's degree. The movie's narrative spans the years 1961 to 1986. It stars Drew Barrymore, Steve Zahn, Brittany Murphy, and James Woods. It was the last feature film directed by Penny Marshall, who directed television productions thereafter, until her death in 2018. Although the film is co-produced by Donofrio, many of its details differ from the book.

== Plot ==
In 1961, 11-year-old Beverly "Bev" Donofrio rides with her father, a police officer named Leonard, in Wallingford, Connecticut. She asks for a bra for Christmas to get the attention of a boy, but he tells her she is too young and to focus on books.

In 1965, Bev's dream is to go to college in New York City to become a writer. She joins her friends Fay and Tina at a party. Fay's older boyfriend Bobby is being deployed to Vietnam, so they have a make-out session while Bev gives a love letter to popular boy Sky. He reads it aloud, and she flees to the bathroom where she's consoled by Ray, a stranger who defends her honor by fighting with Sky. Bev and Ray, with Fay and Bobby, flee the party and go to a lookout where Bobby and Fay have sex. Bev is overcome by Ray's kindness so they do, too.

Bev tells Ray she's pregnant and agrees to a hasty wedding to placate her parents. At the reception, everyone is avoiding Bev, so Fay publicly announces she is also pregnant. The girls celebrate that they will be mothers together but lament missing out on their childhood, the prom, and an education. Bev has a son, Jason (upsetting her, as she wanted a girl), while Fay has a daughter, Amelia. Bev continues studying, but when Jason is three, her interview for a college scholarship goes badly since she has to take Jason along. Although the interviewer praises her writing, he fears she is too distracted. Later, Fay reveals that she and Bobby are getting divorced as he met someone else. Bev tells her she's not sure if she loves Jason because his birth has cost her so much. When he almost drowns in Fay's pool, Bev vows to be more attentive.

At Jason's seventh birthday party, several people from Bev's high school come: Tina is engaged and going to NYU, and Tommy, who had a crush on Bev, just graduated from Berkeley. He suggests she move her family to California to get her degree since the state offers financial aid. Ray confesses to being a heroin addict and spending their savings on drugs. Bev helps him detox, but he sneaks out to get more drugs. Saying he can't quit, she tells him to leave, and Ray agrees. Jason grows bitter over his departure and tells Bev he hates her. Two years later, Bev and Fay help Lizard (Ray's younger brother) dry weed in Bev's oven to get money to study in California. Jason, still bitter, tells Grandpa Leonard, who arrests the mothers. Fay's brother bails out Fay on the condition that Fay and Amelia move with him and cut off contact with Bev. Bev then blames Jason for this.

In 1986, Bev and Jason are driving to see Ray since Bev needs Ray to sign a waiver to publish her memoir. On the way, Jason tells her he wants to transfer from NYU to Indiana University, but Bev refuses, wanting him to get the education she couldn't. Jason calls his now-girlfriend Amelia with the bad news. Arriving at Ray's trailer, Bev explains why they are there. When his wife Shirley demands $100,000, Bev storms out, and Jason follows, calling her selfish for only caring about her book when he finally got to see his father again and accusing her of being a bad mother. Ray tells Jason that leaving was the best thing he could have done for him and sneaks the signed papers to him.

Jason finds Bev, who insists she was a great mother who sacrificed everything for him. He reveals that he is transferring to be with Amelia and apologizes for ruining her life. Bev softens, telling him she is proud and he is the best thing in her life. Feeling responsible for her mistakes and poor choices, Bev gives Jason her car to drive to Indiana, and then calls Leonard for a ride. Complaining that Jason blames her for everything wrong in his life, Bev realizes that she herself has done the same to him. They sing a song from her childhood as they drive away.

== Cast ==
- Drew Barrymore as Beverly Donofrio
  - Mika Boorem as Beverly (age 11)
- Steve Zahn as Ray Hasek, Beverly's husband
- Brittany Murphy as Fay Forrester
- Adam Garcia as Jason Hasek, Beverly & Ray's son (age 20)
  - Logan Lerman as Jason (age 8)
  - Cody Arens as Jason (age 6)
  - Logan Arens as Jason (age 3)
- Lorraine Bracco as Teresa Donofrio, Beverly's mother
- James Woods as Leonard Donofrio, Beverly's father
- Sara Gilbert as Tina
- Desmond Harrington as Bobby, Fay's husband
- David Moscow as Lizard Hasek Ray's younger brother.
- Maggie Gyllenhaal as Amelia Forrester, Fay's daughter and Jason's girlfriend (age 20)
  - Skye McCole Bartusiak as Amelia (age 8)
- Peter Facinelli as Tommy Butcher
- Marisa Ryan as Janet Donofrio, Beverly's sister (age 19)

== Reception ==
Riding in Cars with Boys received mixed reviews. It holds a 49% rating on Rotten Tomatoes based on 109 reviews with an average rating of 5.3/10. The website's critical consensus reads: "Riding in Cars with Boys suffers from mixing grit and pathos with cuteness and comedy. Ironically, many critics found Zahn's character more compelling and three-dimensional than Barrymore's". Metacritic, which uses a weighted average, assigned the film a score of 43 out of 100, based on 31 critics, indicating "mixed or average" reviews. Audiences polled by CinemaScore gave the film an average grade of "B+" on an A+ to F scale.

Roger Ebert gave the film three out of four stars and wrote, "A film like this is refreshing and startling in the way it cuts loose from formula and shows us confused lives we recognize ... This movie is closer to the truth: A lot depends on what happens to you, and then a lot depends on how you let it affect you". In his review for The New York Times, Stephen Holden praised Steve Zahn's performance: "It is hard to imagine what Riding in Cars With Boys would have been without Mr. Zahn's brilliantly nuanced and sympathetic portrayal of Ray, who goes through more changes than Beverly". USA Today gave the film three out of four stars and found that the "strength of the movie lies in these performances and in the situational humor, though ultimately the ending is disappointing, attempting to wrap up loose ends far too neatly".

Lisa Schwarzbaum of Entertainment Weekly gave the film a "C+" rating, and wrote, "... every scene is bumpered with actorly business and production detail that says more about nostalgia for the pop culture of earlier American decades than about the hard socioeconomic truths of being a poor, young, undereducated parent". In her review for The Washington Post, Rita Kempley criticized Barrymore's performance: "Barrymore, a delightful comic actress, has the spunk for the role, but can't do justice to the complexities of Beverly's conflicted personality. So she comes off as abrasive and neglectful as opposed to headstrong and ambitious, winning no empathy for this sour single mom". Edward Guthmann also had problems with Barrymore's performance in his review for the San Francisco Chronicle: "She never relaxes, never surrenders to the character, but instead tries to justify her and to make us like her despite her selfishness and poor mothering. American actors as a rule are terrified of playing unsympathetic characters, particularly when they've gained the celebrity and box-office appeal that Barrymore has". Giving the 2 out of 4 stars, Ron Weiskind of the Pittsburgh Post-Gazette called it "a troubling trip" and "is one bumpy ride".

== Box office ==
Riding in Cars with Boys made $10.8 million during its opening weekend, ranking in second place below From Hell. It grossed $30.1 million in the United States and $35.7 million in total including an international gross of $5.6 million. Compared to its $47 million budget, the film was a box office bomb. The film's box office failure was largely attributed to its post-9/11 release.

== Home media ==
Riding in Cars with Boys was released on DVD and VHS on March 19, 2002.
