= Guncrazy =

- Theatrical release poster
- Directed by: Tamra Davis
- Written by: Matthew Bright
- Produced by: Zane W. Levitt; Diane Firestone
- Starring: Drew Barrymore; James LeGros
- Cinematography: Lisa Rinzler
- Edited by: Kevin Tent
- Music by: Ed Tomney
- Distributed by: First Look International
- Release dates: May 14, 1992 (Cannes Film Festival); October 1992 (Showtime); January 1993 (Limited theatrical release)
- Running time: 97 minutes
- Country: United States
- Language: English
- Box office: $114,516

Guncrazy is a 1992 American independent romantic crime drama film inspired by the 1950 film Gun Crazy. It was directed by Tamra Davis in her feature film directorial debut, written by Matthew Bright, and starring Drew Barrymore and James LeGros. Davis had read the script in 1985, but filming did not begin until November 1991. The film was shown at the Cannes Film Festival on May 14, 1992, and aired on Showtime beginning later that year. It had a limited theatrical release in January 1993.

The film follows a teenage girl (Barrymore) from a small town in Central California who goes on a killing spree with a parolee (LeGros) who she develops a romance through a high school pen pal assignment with after she kills her abusive stepfather.

== Plot ==
Anita Minteer is a 16-year-old girl living in derelict small town in Central California desperate to be popular. She agrees to have sex with two of her rowdy high school classmates, Tom and Bill, after school. Afterward, she returns to the mobile home she lives in with her mother's estranged stepfather, Rooney, who tells her that her mother has run off to find work in Fresno. Given a pen pal assignment by one of her teachers, Anita connects with a 24-year-old convict, Howard Hickok, who is incarcerated at the California Institution for Men in Chino for manslaughter. As they exchange more letters, the two develop a romance and come up with a plan for his parole by faking a religious awakening.

Anita learns how to shoot a pistol with Rooney and later gets into an argument with him. He reveals to her that her mother left to become a prostitute to pay for her heroin addiction. He then forces himself on her, and Anita later shoots him in the back of head, killing him. Later, she meets Howard following his release at a bus station. The two arrive at a snake-handling church operated by Hank Fulton, an auto mechanic who sets Howard up with lodging and work at a service station as an apprentice mechanic.

The next day, Howard meets his parole officer, Mr. Kincaid, who questions if he has remorse for pistol-whipping as a youth and beating two convenience store clerks to death, and ridicules him for his aspirations to be a test shooter for a gun manufacturer given his status as a convicted felon. Anita runs into her childhood friend Joy, who is Mr. Kincaid's daughter. Mr. Kincaid encourages Joy to sever ties with Anita, who dismisses her as white trash given her relationship with Howard, but she disobeys her by giving the two a ride back to Anita's trailer after their pickup trucks breaks down.

The two are discovered by Hank while they are making out, who forbids them from continuing their relationship unless they decide to get married, to which they do in an impromptu ceremony. Following the wedding, Howard is unable to consummate the marriage. Instead, the two reveal secrets about each other, with Howard revealing that he is a virgin. Anita reciprocates by showing him Rooney's decomposing corpse in an old refrigerator in her backyard. She reveals to him her stepfather's sexual abuse, and the two dispose of his body in a furnace at a nearby scrap yard. Tom and Bill arrive at the scrap yard unexpectedly and harass the two. Howard draws a pistol to scare the two. Anita swats at the pistol, which causes Howard to accidentally shoot and kill Bill. Tom pulls a knife and Howard kills him in retaliation. Unable to start their pickup truck, they set it on fire and steal Tom's muscle car which they drive out to the desert in to bury the bodies of Bill and Tom.

The next day, Hank is hospitalized after he is bitten by a rattlesnake. Mr. Kincaid arrives at the hospital to detain Howard in the county jail due to Hank's instability. Howard resists arrest and is chased by an accompanying officer, who Anita shoots and kills. The two take Mr. Kincaid hostage and leave him out in the desert after Anita spares him. The two decide drive to Fresno to find Anita's mother. Later in the evening, Howard and Anita hold up a roadside bar, to which its patrons recognize that Anita has a conscience. The patrons shame her into returning their money. The two get back on the highway heading to Fresno, stopping at a convenience store to steal food.

Arriving in Fresno, they threaten a tow truck driver at gun point who tries to take their car after they get a parking ticket. They arrive at a hotel where they meet her mother's pimp, who reveals that she took off with $1,500 of his and offers Anita work. Offended, Howard beats the pimp. The two break into a luxury manor where they steal the owners' clothes, and eat their food, and use as their hideout. Anita calls Joy on the phone, when a television news broadcast documents their crimes. A reporter interviews Howard's own father, who states that he would execute his own son on the electric chair. They plan to flee to South America and make love later that night for the first time.

Law enforcement arrive at the house from tracing Anita's phone call with Joy and surround it. Howard determines that Anita may have a chance of walking free and pretends to be her captor. She kills two cops, and Howard's takes her revolver so he can take the fall. Howard has one last goodbye with Anita before he is killed in a suicide by cop. Mr. Kincaid arrives at the house and takes Anita away, sparing her as she spared him.

== Cast ==
- Drew Barrymore as Anita Minteer
- Michael Ironside as Mr. Kincaid, Joy's Father
- James LeGros as Howard Hickok
- Billy Drago as Hank Fulton
- Robert Greenberg as Mr. Sheets
- Rodney Harvey as Tom
- Jeremy Davies as Bill
- Dan Eisenstein as Chuck
- Joe Dallesandro as Rooney
- Ione Skye as Joy Kincaid
- James Oseland as Sally
- Lawrence Steven Meyers as Larry "Crazy Larry"
- Herb Weld as Clyde
- Lee Mary Weilnau as Susan
- Dick Warlock as Sheriff
- Michael Franco as Officer Frank
- Tracey Walter as Elton
- Roger Jackson as Joe
- Zane W. Levitt as Ed Hopper
- Damon Jones as Damian
- Harrison Young as Mr. Hickok, Howard's Father
- Leo Lee as "Soda Pop", Pimp
- Rowena Guinness as Ruby, The Prostitute
- Jaid Barrymore as Woman With Dog
- Diamond The Dog as Schlitzy The Dog

== Production ==
Guncrazy was Tamra Davis' directorial debut, and was written by Matthew Bright. The film was inspired by the 1950 film Gun Crazy, but is not a remake. Davis originally read the script in 1985 and "loved it because it was one of the few scripts I'd come across that revolved around a strong female character. I then spent years trying to set the picture up and hearing people say, 'Why do you want to make a film about two awful kids who go around killing people?' But that wasn't the picture I saw." According to the Los Angeles Times, Davis was interested in the script because of "the complex psychology of the female lead character, the lower-middle-class milieu where the tale unfolds, and how the story romanticizes the gun." Davis said, "I'd never held a gun before making this movie, I don't own one now and the last thing I want to do is romanticize guns. I wanted to show that America is obsessed with guns, and that if you have them around, bad things can happen because it only takes a second to pull the trigger."

Barrymore repeatedly called to plead that she play the role of Anita. Davis later said, "I saw her and knew she was perfect. You could see she's been through a lot, and the world has not been easy to her. And yet she has this incredible vulnerability. She's so determined to prove that she's worthy of the Barrymore name." Barrymore said, "Anita was very close to home for me. Not that I was so much like her. I'm not. But I had the best understanding of her than any character I've ever played in my life." Barrymore declined to have a chauffeur drive her to the filming locations, which is commonly done for actors. According to Davis: "She said, 'No, you're not going to treat me like a baby.' She said, 'I can get to work on time on my own.'"

Merrie Lawson, the film's costume designer, observed girls at Pasadena's Eagle Rock Plaza shopping mall to determine how Barrymore's character should dress: "We were looking for a real-life gutter image. We didn't want it to look like Hollywood. We wanted a little girl, living without a mother, who only can buy clothes every few years. I got everything from the Salvation Army, St. Vincent de Paul's and Goodwill shops." According to Lawson, undersized dresses were chosen for Barrymore "as if they were years old and all of a sudden she grew a bust." Lawson also tie-dyed all of Barrymore's clothing, including the socks, "to give the image of someone who doesn't do laundry very often, and does it all together."

Filming began on November 10, 1991, in Los Angeles, California, where a majority of filming occurred. Filming in Los Angeles concluded after 23 days. Guncrazy's opening shots were filmed in Ely, Nevada. The film was created at a cost of either $800,000 or $900,000.

== Release ==
The film premiered at the Cannes Film Festival on May 14, 1992. The film did not attract much interest from theater exhibitors at the festival, and its distribution rights went to Showtime and Academy Entertainment, which had the highest bids, covering the cost of making the film. In September 1992, the film was shown at the Toronto International Film Festival, where it was noticed by Los Angeles film consultant Ray Price. The film's producers were asked by Price if he could organize a theatrical release, despite the film being categorized as a television movie and being planned for video release.

The film began airing on Showtime in October 1992, and aired five times during that fall. Price recalled, "I found myself saying to theater people: 'I have this film which has been on television and is coming out on video. Would you like to play it?'" The film was shown at Los Angeles' Landmark Nuart theater in January 1993, and successfully earned $9,211 after five showings. Later that month, on January 27, 1993, the film premiered at Manhattan's Film Forum theater for a scheduled two-week period. In its second weekend at Film Forum, the film's revenue decreased 34 percent as a result of only being shown on one screen instead of two; however, the film still earned a successful $10,302. In its fourth weekend at Film Forum, revenue decreased 30 percent, earning the film $5,191. In its sixth weekend at Film Forum, the film earned $3,971, up 19 percent from the previous weekend.

As of February 1993, the film was also being shown in Dallas, Cleveland, and Seattle, after it earned positive reviews from showings in New York and Los Angeles. Academy Entertainment released the film on VHS on February 24, 1993, while it was still being shown in theaters. At that time, the film had grossed $125,000 from theatrical showings. The New York Times noted that it was unusual for films to be shown in theaters after they have been broadcast on television and released on video.

== Reception ==
On website Rotten Tomatoes, the film has a rating of 63% based on reviews from 8 critics.

Todd McCarthy of Variety wrote that the film is "competently made" but "lacks the exhilaration of a first-class lovers-on-the-run crime drama". Kenneth Turan of the Los Angeles Times wrote a positive review and stated, "Made with sureness and authority, this film doesn't condescend to either its characters or their relationship, and that counts for a lot." Turan wrote that although the film "is very efficiently made (and stylishly photographed by Lisa Rinzler, one of a very few women cinematographers) it does occasionally overreach, going a little heavy on the rural grotesques as well as the romantic nature of the Anita/Howard relationship. On the other hand, it is the film's ability to mostly show us that relationship on its own terms, to reveal both why these two are made for each other and why their very closeness inevitably leads to disaster, that is its strongest suit. With moments of odd, dark humor sprinkled among the violence, this traditional study of psycho kittens in love breaks just enough new ground to be an impressive piece of work."

Peter Travers of Rolling Stone called Guncrazy a "knock-out B movie". Vincent Canby of The New York Times called the film "very accomplished and "cruelly entertaining", and praised the "excellent screenplay". Canby called the film "a remarkably rich melodrama with a strong narrative line and vivid characters. There's no waste space in this movie. Every second of its 97 minutes counts." Hal Hinson of The Washington Post called the film a "source of constant surprise," and wrote that Bright's screenplay "gives the movie a strong sense of direction even when his characters are lost. Plus, Bright gives the actors some classic deadpan lines." Marc Savlov of The Austin Chronicle gave the film three and a half stars out of five and wrote, "Barrymore proves -- once again -- that she's better than 98% of the teenage actresses out there; she manages to make Anita simultaneously pathetic in her desperate neediness and powerful in her smoldering, turbo-charged teenage sexuality."

TV Guide gave the film three stars out of five and wrote, "Marketing-minded folks may be quick to position Guncrazy as a 90s take on Bonnie and Clyde (1967), and its title is certainly meant to evoke Joseph H. Lewis's 1949 classic Gun Crazy. But this film is by no means as brash, startling, or iconoclastic as either." TV Guide also wrote, "Despite her character's actions and circumstances, Barrymore brilliantly makes the audience believe Anita is not a slutty piece of trailer trash with her guileless, winning smile and chirpy good-heartedness." Fred Beldin of AllMovie gave the film two and a half stars out of five and called it an "effective low-key thriller". Beldin praised Barrymore's performance and called Drago's character "unforgettable", stating that he played the role "with just the right combination of huckster con artist and hardcore Holy Roller."

=== Awards ===
Barrymore was nominated for Best Actress in a Miniseries or Television Film at the 50th Golden Globe Awards.
