= List of Darkwing Duck episodes =

Darkwing Duck is an American animated television series produced by The Walt Disney Company. It originally aired on the syndicated programming block The Disney Afternoon and Saturday mornings on ABC from 1991 to 1992. Reruns of the series continued to air on The Disney Afternoon until 1995 and again between 1996 and 1997. The series originally aired as a preview-run on The Disney Channel in the spring of 1991 before beginning its main runs in September of that year. Episode air dates for this preview-run are not currently available. The series featured an eponymous anthropomorphic duck superhero with the alter ego of Drake Mallard, voiced by Jim Cummings.

A total of 91 episodes were made: 78 for the first season, 13 for the second. For the first season (1991–92), 65 aired in syndication on The Disney Afternoon, 13 as part ABC's Saturday morning lineup. The stations carrying The Disney Afternoon launched Darkwing Duck during the weekend of Friday, September 6th–Sunday, September 8th, 1991 (day and time varied by market) by a two-hour special, The Darkwing Duck Premiere / Back to School with the Mickey Mouse Club. The Darkwing Duck half of this combo packageconsisted of a complete broadcast of the two-part "Darkly Dawns the Duck". The first ABC episode, "That Sinking Feeling", aired during that same weekend, on Saturday, September 7th, 1991. In turn, the series' regular Disney Afternoon syndicated weekday run then kicked off on Monday, September 9th, 1991, with "Beauty and the Beet". (The exact dates on which the standard two-part serialized version of "Darkly Dawns the Duck" first aired are unknown, but they were during the fall of 1991.)

The Disney Afternoon episodes and the first 13 ABC episodes are listed separately. In fact, the 65 syndicated episodes and the first 13 ABC episodes constitute a single production season, but Disney originally kept the ABC episodes separate from the syndicated episodes for distribution purposes (network deal versus syndication deal). ABC renewed Darkwing Duck for the fall of 1992, enabling the series' 13-episode second, final, season. All 26 episodes that originally aired on ABC were added to the series' syndicated Disney Afternoon rotation in the fall of 1993, after ABC declined to renew the series further and removed it from the network's schedule.

Since the syndicated and ABC episodes are separated here, episodes are not listed according to their broadcast chronology. In addition, even the broadcast order of the first 78 episodes does not reflect their in-universe chronology – for example, Liquidator's origin episode "Dry Hard" was aired after his appearances in "Just Us Justice Ducks" and "Life, the Negaverse and Everything". The series' production order (with the exception of "Darkly Dawns the Duck") most closely reflects the intended chronological episode order.

== Series overview ==
Season	Episodes	Originally released		
Season	Episodes	First released	Last released	Network
1 — syndicated	65	September 6, 1991	May 20, 1992	syndicated (The Disney Afternoon)
1 — ABC	13	September 7, 1991	November 30, 1991	ABC
2	13	September 12, 1992	December 12, 1992	ABC

== Episodes ==
=== Season 1 — syndicated episodes (The Disney Afternoon) (1991–92) ===
No. overall	No. in season	Title	Directed by	Written by	Villain(s)	Original release date	Prod. code
1	1	"Darkly Dawns the Duck: Part 1"	Dale Case and John Kimball	Story by : Jan Strnad and Tad Stones; Written by : Jymn Magon and Tad Stones; Storyboarded by : Kurt Anderson and Roy Wilson	Taurus Bulba, Hammerhead Hannigan, Hoof, Mouth, Clovis, and Tantalus	September 6, 1991	4308-052
Darkwing Duck is a little-known crime fighter of St. Canard, dying for a big break, and the publicity that goes with it. Yet when he gets on the trail of the infamous Taurus Bulba's latest scheme, he gets into more trouble than he expected, and ends up adopting a young girl, by the name of Gosalyn.
2	2	"Darkly Dawns the Duck: Part 2"	Marsh Lamore and Rick Leon	Story by : Jan Strnad and Tad Stones; Written by : Jymn Magon and Tad Stones; Storyboarded by : Lonnie Thompson and Hank Tucker	Taurus Bulba, Hammerhead Hannigan, Hoof, Mouth, Clovis, and Tantalus	September 6, 1991	4308-053
Gosalyn is now under Darkwing's protection, but Taurus Bulba is still out to get her, believing she has the Waddlemeyer Ramrod arming code when she actually doesn't know anything about it.
3	3	"Beauty and the Beet"	John Kimball and Bob Zamboni	Written by : John Behnke, Rob Humphrey, and Jim Peterson; Storyboarded by : Steve Gordon and Jan Green	Bushroot	September 9, 1991; Disney Channel preview: May 5, 1991	4308-018
Reginald Bushroot, a plant scientist, only wants to make the world a better place to live, but his colleagues mock his passion for plants. When he subjects himself to his own experiments, he becomes a half-plant, half-duck mutant, and now desires to get even with his tormentors.: Title Reference: Beauty and the Beast; Absent: Gosalyn
4	4	"Getting Antsy"	John Kimball and Bob Zamboni	Written by : Doug Langdale; Storyboarded by : Kurt Anderson and Hank Tucker	Lilliput	September 10, 1991; Disney Channel preview: June 22, 1991	4308-008
Lilliput, the owner of the local golf course, has invented a helmet that allows him to communicate with ants. He then uses a shrink ray to shrink the buildings and landmarks of St. Canard, using the ants to haul the now-shrunk buildings back to the golf course, where they become part of the course. Eventually Lilliput shrinks Darkwing down to an even tinier size.
5	5	"Night of the Living Spud"	Bob Shellhorn and Mike Svayko	Written by : Steve Roberts; Storyboarded by : Ryan Anthony, Holly Forsyth, and George Goode	Bushroot and Posey	September 11, 1991; Disney Channel preview: June 15, 1991	4308-040
Bushroot tries to grow a wife for himself, but the result is not the flower that he expected.: Title Reference: Night of the Living Dead
6	6	"Apes of Wrath"	Marsh Lamore and Rick Leon	Written by : Dev Ross; Storyboarded by : Kurt Anderson, Hank Tucker, and Curt Walstaed	Major Trenchrot	September 12, 1991; Disney Channel preview: May 19, 1991	4308-016
S.H.U.S.H. sends Darkwing, Launchpad, and Gosalyn to Africa to find missing famous anthropologist Dr. Beatrice Bruté. Darkwing discovers that Major Trenchrot is planning to open a vacation villa for villains.: Title Reference: The Grapes of Wrath
7	7	"Dirty Money"	Mircea Mantta and Bob Treat	Written by : John Behnke, Rob Humphrey, and Jim Peterson; Storyboarded by : Jill Colbert and Chris Rutkowski	Ammonia Pine	September 13, 1991; Disney Channel preview: April 28, 1991	4308-004
Someone is stealing the money in Saint Canard by erasing all ink on the banknotes and leaving them nothing but worthless papers. S.H.U.S.H. Director J. Gander Hooter calls on Darkwing to help solve the mystery but chief Agent Gryzlikoff doesn't trust him. Darkwing discovers that the thief is Ammonia Pine, a woman who used to be a maid until some dangerous chemicals caused her to be obsessed with cleaning.: Absent: Gosalyn
8	8	"Duck Blind"	Mircea Mantta, Tom Ray, and Mitch Rochon	Written by : Len Uhley; Storyboarded by : Victor Cook, Larry Eikleberry, and Jim Willoughby	Megavolt	September 16, 1991	4308-017
Darkwing Duck falls afoul of Megavolt and comes out blind. Undaunted, DW tries to keep going using a few inventive gadgets, but Gosalyn, Honker and Launchpad almost get killed because of his arrogance. Gosalyn and the gang plan to nab Megavolt themselves, but get caught by him instead.
9	9	"Comic Book Capers"	Dale Case, John Kimball, and Bob Zamboni	Written by : John Behnke, Rob Humphrey, and Jim Peterson; Storyboarded by : Kurt Anderson and Hank Tucker	Megavolt	September 17, 1991	4308-036
Infuriated at how he's portrayed in his new comic book, Darkwing decides he can write the comic better himself. But he keeps getting interrupted by everyone, who then add their own little bits. Finally, even Megavolt joins in the writing of the story.
10	10	"Water Way to Go"	Bob Shellhorn and Mike Svayko	Written by : Dev Ross; Storyboarded by : Holly Forsyth, George Goode, and Rich Chidlaw	Steelbeak	September 18, 1991	4308-001
S.H.U.S.H. has given Darkwing Duck a case to travel to Oilrabia and stop Steelbeak. F.O.W.L.'s top agent is threatening to flood the country with a portable weather machine. The only problem is that Darkwing has agreed to let Launchpad assume the role as hero and be a sidekick himself for the mission.: Title Reference: What a Way to Go!; Absent: Gosalyn
11	11	"Paraducks"	Bob Shellhorn and Mike Svayko	Written by : Doug Langdale; Storyboarded by : Yi-Chih Chen, Robert Souza, and Hank Tucker	The King and his gang	September 19, 1991	4308-033
Darkwing goes back in time with Gosalyn and he meets himself in grade school when he was known as "Drakey". He then sees a record shop being robbed by a gang of greasers. Due to Darkwing's inaction, Darkwing's present time gets changed when the duo comes back to the present. Therefore, Darkwing and Gosalyn must again go back to the past to restore it.: Title Reference: Paradox (Dictionary definition: "a statement or proposition that seems self-contradictory or absurd but in reality expresses a possible truth."); Absent: Launchpad
12	12	"Easy Come, Easy Grows"	David Brain	Written by : Marion Wells; Storyboarded by : Rich Chidlaw, James McLean, and David Prince	Bushroot	September 20, 1991	4308-024
Darkwing investigates a case in which money is disappearing along with the bank vaults. Bushroot creates a tree covered with money.: Title Reference: Easy Come, Easy Go
13	13	"A Revolution in Home Appliances"	Mircea Mantta and Bob Treat	Written by : Gary Sperling; Storyboarded by : Holly Forsyth, George Goode, and John Norton	Megavolt and the appliances	September 23, 1991	4308-050
Megavolt gets zapped with his new invention, which lets him bring regular home appliances to life. He assembles a group consisting of a salon chair, a refrigerator, a guitar, and a TV. Darkwing Duck has to stop them before they take over St. Canard.
14	14	"Trading Faces"	Bob Shellhorn and Michael Svayko	Written by : Julia Jane Lewald and Dev Ross; Storyboarded by : Ryan Anthony, Rich Chidlaw, Jill Colbert, and Chris Rutkowski	Steelbeak	September 24, 1991; Disney Channel preview: June 1, 1991	4308-014
Darkwing's computer goes haywire causing him to trade bodies with Gosalyn as do Launchpad and Honker. Now Gosalyn must pose as Darkwing to stop F.O.W.L.'s latest scheme – stopping the Earth's rotation in an attempt to blackmail the planet.: Title Reference: Trading Places
15	15	"Hush, Hush Sweet Charlatan"	Carole Beers and Terence Harrison	Written by : Carter Crocker; Storyboarded by : Sharon Forward and Roy Shishido	Tuskernini and "the phantom"	September 25, 1991; Disney Channel preview: April 21, 1991	4308-015
Darkwing Duck investigates the production of a movie, which is plagued by accidents and turns out to be directed by none other than Tuskernini, who has abandoned his life of crime for the cinema.: Title Reference: Hush… Hush, Sweet Charlotte
16	16	"Can't Bayou Love"	Vincente Bassols and Mitch Rochon	Written by : Dean Stefan; Storyboarded by : Elizabeth Chapman, James McLean, and David Prince	Jambalaya Jake and Gumbo	September 26, 1991; Disney Channel preview: May 12, 1991	4308-012
Jambalaya Jake and his alligator Gumbo, both from the bayou, have moved to the city after hearing it was "easy pickings". By using Launchpad as bait, they try and catch Darkwing. But Darkwing shows them first hand that in the city it is in fact no "easy pickings". Debut of Jambalaya Jake and Gumbo.: Title Reference: Can't Buy Me Love; Absent: Gosalyn
17	17	"Bearskin Thug"	Mircea Mantta and Bob Treat	Written by : Tad Stones and Pat Corcoran; Storyboarded by : Jill Colbert and Chris Rutkowski	Steelbeak	September 27, 1991	4308-029
Drake takes Gosalyn on a camping trip to teach her about the great outdoors. However, the national park has been evacuated due to a monstrous bear controlled by Steelbeak that has been attacking both campers and wildlife alike.: Title Reference: Bearskin Rug; Absent: Launchpad
18	18	"You Sweat Your Life"	Vincente Bassols, Mitch Rochon, and Tom Ray	Written by : Julia Jane Lewald and Marion Wells; Storyboarded by : Elizabeth Chapman, John Norton, David Schwartz, and Wendell Washer	Jock Newbody, Slim, and Flex	September 30, 1991; Disney Channel preview: May 25, 1991	4308-013
Darkwing goes undercover at a spa to root out a pair of workers responsible for a museum break-in. To his dismay, Herb and Binkie Muddlefoot tag along. The health spa owner, Jock, has discovered the formula for a fountain of youth. The last ingredient he needs is a feather from a true hero: Darkwing Duck.: Title Reference: You Bet Your Life; Absent: Gosalyn
19	19	"Days of Blunder"	Bob Shellhorn and Mike Svayko	Written by : Jan Strnad; Storyboarded by : Ryan Anthony, Jill Colbert, and Chris Rutkowski	Quackerjack	October 1, 1991	4308-044
Posing as a psychiatrist, Quackerjack convinces Darkwing that being a superhero isn't right for him. With Darkwing out of the picture, the criminal is free to go on a crime spree.: Title Reference: Days of Thunder
20	20	"Just Us Justice Ducks: Part 1"	Dale Case and John Kimball	Written by : Kevin Campbell and Brian Swenlin; Storyboarded by : John Flagg and Wendell Washer	The Fearsome Five	October 2, 1991	4308-047
Negaduck, Bushroot, Quackerjack, Megavolt, and Liquidator all join together as the Fearsome Five to defeat Darkwing Duck and take over St. Canard. When the other superheroes (Neptunia, Gizmoduck, Morgana, and Stegmutt) hear about it, they band together to form the Justice Ducks. Darkwing, who wants all the credit for the Fearsome Five's defeat, is less than thrilled – but when he faces the Fearsome Five, he soon finds out that the job is more than he can handle.
21	21	"Just Us Justice Ducks: Part 2"	Marsh Lamore and Rick Leon	Written by : Kevin Campbell and Brian Swenlin; Storyboarded by : Kurt Anderson and Jim Willoughby	The Fearsome Five	October 3, 1991	4308-048
The Justice Ducks are each defeated and captured by the Fearsome Five. Darkwing soon becomes their only hope, and the five heroes join in battle against the villains, with the ultimate victors deciding the fate of the whole city.
22	22	"Double Darkwings"	David Brain and Tom Ray	Written by : Dean Stefan; Storyboarded by : Sharon Forward and Roy Shishido	Jambalaya Jake and Gumbo	October 4, 1991	4308-019
To get revenge on Darkwing, Jambalaya Jake has Granny Whammy mix him up a hex. He mistakes Launchpad for Darkwing (while he is posing as Darkwing Decoy) and targets him with the curse. Now Jamabalya is using Launchpad as a partner in crime, and Darkwing is getting all the blame for it.: Note: There are two versions of the episode marked Double Darkwings: in the first, Jambalaya Jake lures Darkwing to a tower by having Gumbo bite a power line, and finally, in the second, Jamablaya Jake lures Darkwing to the power company by causing a blackout by pouring hot sauce into a telephone. Otherwise, the episodes are identical.; Absent: Gosalyn
23	23	"Aduckyphobia"	Mircea Mantta and Bob Treat	Written by : Doug Langdale; Storyboarded by : Elizabeth Chapman, Yi-Chih Chen, and Robert Souza	Professor Moliarty	October 7, 1991; Disney Channel preview: June 29, 1991	4308-021
In a parodied version of one of the Marvel Comics superheroes, Spider-Man, a mutated spider bite causes Darkwing to grow four extra arms. When it creates the hero trouble while trying to catch Moliarty, Darkwing adopts a new super-hero identity – Arachno-Duck.: Title Reference: Arachnophobia
24	24	"When Aliens Collide"	Charles A. Nichols, Bob Treat, and David Brain	Written by : Jeremy Cushner; Storyboarded by : Jill Colbert, Chris Rutkowski, and Robert Souza	Wacko	October 8, 1991	4308-056
Gosalyn comes upon a spaceship that has crashed in the park. A cute alien emerges, wearing a rather restrictive collar which he doesn't seem to be fond of. However, it turns out, that the extraterrestrial is actually a wanted criminal and Darkwing has to stop him.: Title Reference: When Worlds Collide
25	25	"Jurassic Jumble"	Vincente Bassols and Mitch Rochon	Written by : Marlowe Shawn Weisman; Storyboarded by : Ryan Anthony, John Norton, David Schwartz, Curt Walstaed, Wendell Washer, and Jim Willoughby	Dr. Fossil	October 10, 1991	4308-031
Honker and Gosalyn track down a set of dinosaur footprints, and are led to the nefarious Dr. Fossil, duck turned dinosaur. With his de-evolution ray and the aid of a passing comet, Fossil plans to end the current life on the planet to give dinosaurs a second chance.
26	26	"Cleanliness is Next to Badliness"	Dale Case, John Kimball, and Bob Zamboni	Written by : Steven Hibbert and Gary Sperling; Storyboarded by : Jan Green and Roy Wilson	Steelbeak and Ammonia Pine	October 15, 1991	4308-039
Steelbeak teams up with agent Ammonia Pine to clean out banks for F.O.W.L. Gosalyn starts a Darkwing fan club.: Title Reference: Cleanliness is Next to Godliness
27	27	"Smarter Than a Speeding Bullet"	Charles A. Nichols	Written by : Doug Langdale; Storyboarded by : Ron Campbell	Steelbeak	October 17, 1991	4308-045
As Steelbeak is stealing rubber duckies, Darkwing's attempt to stop him is interrupted by Comet Guy, a superhero from another planet who is looking for a hero to train him.: Title Reference: Faster than a speeding bullet; Absent: Gosalyn
28	28	"All's Fahrenheit in Love and War"	Dale Case and John Kimball	Written by : Eric Lewald and Dev Ross; Storyboarded by : Lonnie Thompson, Richard Morrison, and Craig Kemplin	Isis Vanderchill	October 21, 1991	4308-027
Darkwing becomes fed up with the cold, so he decides to go on a vacation. But before he can, he finds out that banks are being robbed, with no forced entry.: Title Reference: All's Fair in Love and War; Absent: Gosalyn
29	29	"Whiffle While You Work"	Mircea Mantta and Bob Treat	Written by : Ellen M. Svaco and Collen Taber; Storyboarded by : Elizabeth Chapman, Jill Colbert, Holly Forsyth, and George Goode	Quackerjack	October 23, 1991	4308-023
Gosalyn and Darkwing are hyped over a video game competition involving the popular Whiffle Boy. However, a toy maker gone insane, Quackerjack, is out to get revenge on the video game industry that put him out of business. Both Darkwing and Quackerjack end up trapped in a Whiffle Boy video game.: Song: Whistle While You Work; Absent: Launchpad
30	30	"Ghoul of My Dreams"	Vincente Bassols, Carole Beers, and Terence Harrison	Written by : John Behnke, Rob Humphrey, and Jim Peterson; Storyboarded by : Victor Cook and David Schwartz	Nodoff and Morgana MacCawber	October 31, 1991	4308-041
Morgana is using sleep sand to rob the citizens of St. Canard while they sleepwalk. When Darkwing steps in to set things right, he ends up in dreamland. Nodoff, controller of dreamland and supplier of Morgana's sleep sand wants the entire city to snooze, and will see to it that no one gets in his way.: Note: Megavolt, Quackerjack, Bushroot, Liquidator, Steelbeak and Ammonia Pine makes non-speaking cameo appearance in Darkwing's dream.; Absent: Gosalyn; Note: As in the parody of the Bonkers series: "Do Toons Dream of Animated Sheep?"
31	31	"Adopt-a-Con"	Vincente Bassols, Carole Beers, and Bob Shellhorn	Written by : Steve Roberts; Storyboarded by : Ryan Anthony, Elizabeth Chapman, Rich Chidlaw, Robert Lamb, Swinton Scott, and Roy Wilson	Tuskernini	November 7, 1991	4308-046
In a successful case, Adopt-a-Con means the Adopt A Convict Program. The program has sent Tuskernini to Drake's house. DW is sure that Tusker won't reform, even though he acts as if he has. Posing as Bushroot, he takes Launchpad, Gosalyn, and Drake hostages to fish out Darkwing. But Drake's already a hostage himself.
32	32	"Toys Czar Us"	Marsh Lamore and Rick Leon	Written by : Ellen M. Svaco and Collen Taber; Storyboarded by : Curt Walstaed, Wendell Washer, and Jim Willoughby	Quackerjack	November 11, 1991	4308-043
When Quackerjack learns that parents won't buy his dangerous toys, he decides to create a toy utopia for children, with him as the ruler. Gosalyn gets into trouble at school, causing the principal to suggest Drake take a better look at his parenting. Drake gives up Darkwing to become the perfect parent just as Quackerjack executes his insane plot.: Title Reference: Toys "R" Us
33	33	"The Secret Origins of Darkwing Duck"	Marsh Lamore and Rick Leon	Written by : Jan Strnad; Storyboarded by : Victor Cook and John Flagg	Negaduck	November 13, 1991	4308-055
In the distant future, Gosaloid (a futuristic version of Gosalyn) and her friend get trapped in the Darkwing Duck Museum after it closes, and hear the alleged story of the "secret origins" of Darkwing Duck (a combined spoof the Superman origin story and the TV series Kung Fu) from a suspiciously familiar janitor.
34	34	"Up, Up and Awry"	Vincente Bassols, David Brain, and Mitch Rochon	Written by : Dev Ross; Storyboarded by : Sharon Forward, David Schwartz, and Roy Shishido	Megavolt	November 14, 1991	4308-042
Gizmoduck comes to St. Canard to help stop Megavolt's latest scheme; stealing horseshoes and cable to build a giant electromagnet. Darkwing is hardly receptive and wallows in self-pity as Gizmoduck takes the spotlight.: Title Reference: Up, Up and Away
35	35	"Life, the Negaverse and Everything"	Rick Leon and Mike Svayko	Written by : Kevin Campbell and Brian Swenlin; Storyboarded by : Lonnie Thompson, Hank Tucker, and Richard Morrison	Negaduck, Nega-Launchpad, and the Nega-Muddlefoots	November 18, 1991	4308-049
While pursuing the Fearsome Five, Darkwing is thrown into a giant cake – which serves as a portal between his world and the Negaverse. In the Negaverse, everything is the extreme opposite of his world and Negaduck is supreme ruler, so Darkwing decides to use his new friends (The "Friendly Four") to change things a bit, which Negaduck does not like.: Title Reference: Life, the Universe and Everything
36	36	"Dry Hard"	Vincente Bassols and Mitch Rochon	Written by : Kevin Campbell, and Brian Swenlin; Storyboarded by : John Norton, David Schwartz, Hank Tucker, and Wendell Washer	The Liquidator	November 20, 1991	4308-026
Bud Flud, the crooked owner of a bottled water company, has been sabotaging his competitors' drinking water to promote his own. Darkwing moves to stop him, but Flud falls into a vat of contaminated water, only to survive and become a hydrokinetic mutant known as the Liquidator. Now, Liquidator proceeds to turn all of St. Canard's water hard and DW must stop him.: Title Reference: Die Hard
37	37	"Heavy Mental"	Bob Shellhorn and Mike Svayko	Written by : Kevin Campbell and Brian Swenlin; Storyboarded by : Yi-Chih Chen, Dale Schott, and Robert Souza	Major Synapse, Hotshot and Flygirl	November 21, 1991	4308-020
Launchpad gains psychic powers, but has trouble controlling them. F.O.W.L. agent, Major Synapse, steals S.H.U.S.H.'s Nora Ray, and uses it on his underlings to give them super brain powers.: Title Reference: Heavy Metal
38	38	"Disguise the Limit"	Vincente Bassols, Carole Beers, and David Brain	Written by : Doug Langdale; Storyboarded by : Ron Campbell	Negaduck	November 26, 1991	4308-063
Negaduck, disguised, frames Darkwing for a series of crimes. Thanks to S.H.U.S.H. director J. Gander Hooter knowing that Darkwing is innocent, he arranges for him to use an experimental S.H.U.S.H. design to go into hiding, which ends up causing him to spontaneously change into whomever he looks at.: Title Reference: The Sky's the Limit
39	39	"Planet of the Capes"	Dale Case and John Kimball	Written by : Ellen M. Svaco and Colleen Taber; Storyboarded by : Kurt Anderson and Chris Rutkowski	Ordinary Guy	November 27, 1991	4308-061
When Comet Guy returns, he tells Darkwing he needs him back on his planet. Darkwing thinks that he's going to have to save the planet, until he finds out that everyone on the planet is a hero, and they need him as their "ordinary guy," since the last one left. They want Darkwing to be their 'damsel in distress,' so that they'll have someone to rescue. But Darkwing gets fed up, so he tries to turn Comet Guy into a villain.: Title Reference: Planet of the Apes; Absent: Launchpad and Gosalyn
40	40	"Darkwing Doubloon"	Carole Beers and David Brain	Written by : Bruce Reid Schaefer; Storyboarded by : Ryan Anthony, Elizabeth Chapman, Rich Chidlaw, Jill Colbert, Roy Shishido, and Curt Walstead	The Fearsome Five	December 16, 1991	4308-051
Set in the past, Darkwing Doubloon (the penultimate episode of Darkwing Duck from the 1990s) recounts the story of Darkwing Doubloon's adventures fighting the evil pirate Negaduck and his crew of villainous miscreants.
41	41	"It's a Wonderful Leaf"	Carole Beers, David Brain, and Bob Shellhorn	Written by : John Behnke, Rob Humphrey, and Jim Peterson; Storyboarded by : Ryan Anthony, Rich Chidlaw, Albert Ring, Phil Weinstein, and Carin-Anne Anderson	Bushroot	December 23, 1991	4308-060
The crowded, pushy holiday shoppers rub Bushroot the wrong way. He decides to ruin Christmas by taking control of all of St. Canard's Christmas trees.: Title Reference: It's a Wonderful Life
42	42	"Twitching Channels"	Marsh Lamore and Rick Leon	Written by : John Behnke, Rob Humphrey, and Jim Peterson; Storyboarded by : Kurt Anderson, Chris Rutkowski, and Curt Walstead	Megavolt	February 5, 1992	4308-065
Megavolt's latest device accidentally transports him and Darkwing into the human world, where a writer has been using a device to listen in on Darkwing's world and has adapted Darkwing's adventures into a cartoon show.: Title Reference: Switching Channels; Absent: Launchpad and Gosalyn
43	43	"Dances with Bigfoot"	David Brain and Bob Shellhorn	Written by : Ellen Svaco and Colleen Taber; Storyboarded by : Ryan Anthony, Rich Chidlaw, Albert Ring, and Phil Weinstein	Bigfoot Tribe	February 6, 1992	4308-069
Drake Mallard disappears and it's up to the Crimson Quackette to find him.: Title Reference: Dances with Wolves; Absent: Launchpad
44	44	"Twin Beaks"	Marsh Lamore, Rick Leon, and Toby Shelton	Written by : Tad Stones and Jan Strnad; Storyboarded by : Victor Cook, John Flagg, Curt Walstaed, and Fred Warter	Bushroot, Mutant Alien Cabbages	February 10, 1992	4308-067
In a parodied version of the TV series Twin Peaks, Honker's parents go missing and all clues point to the mysterious town of Twin Beaks where mutant alien cabbages have begun their conquest of Earth.: Title Reference: Twin Peaks; Story Reference: Invasion of the Body Snatchers
45	45	"The Incredible Bulk"	Vincente Bassols and Carole Beers	Written by : Gary Sperling; Storyboarded by : Sharon Forward, David Schwartz, and Carin-Anne Anderson	Bushroot and Daisy	February 12, 1992	4308-062
Bushroot creates a new experimental fertilizer that causes plants to grow large and strong.: Title Reference: The Incredible Hulk
46	46	"My Valentine Ghoul"	Dale Case and John Kimball	Written by : Doug Langdale; Storyboarded by : Kurt Anderson and Chris Rutkowski	Negaduck	February 14, 1992	4308-068
Darkwing's refusal of Morgana's suggestion of help makes her very angry, which Negaduck sees as an opportunity.: Absent: Launchpad
47	47	"Dead Duck"	Dale Case and John Kimball	Written by : Carter Crocker; Storyboarded by : Steve Gordon, Lonnie Thompson, Phil Weinstein, and Denise Koyama	Megavolt, Beelzebub, Death	February 17, 1992	4308-058
When his helmet for the Ratcatcher is damaged while pursuing Megavolt, it results in Darkwing getting killed in a traffic accident and Megavolt getting the fame for it. However, Darkwing doesn't believe that he is dead until the Grim Reaper comes after him.
48	48	"A Duck by Any Other Name"	Marsh Lamore and Rick Leon	Written by : Pat Corcoran; Storyboarded by : Viki Anderson, Lonnie Thompson, and Wendell Washer	Tuskernini	February 18, 1992	4308-006
A news program reveals Darkwing Duck's identity as Launchpad. Tuskernini decides to use the revelation to his own advantage, but fails when the real Darkwing Duck gets in the way.
49	49	"Let's Get Respectable"	Dale Case and John Kimball	Written by : Bruce Reid Schaefer; Storyboarded by : Victor Cook, John Flagg, Karl Gnass, and Carin-Anne Anderson	Negaduck	February 20, 1992	4308-064
After a television program shows that Darkwing has a poor reputation with the public, Gosalyn decides that he needs an image change. Meanwhile, Negaduck plans to use this to his own advantage.
50	50	"In Like Blunt"	David Brain, Marsh Lamore, and Rick Leon	Written by : Kevin Campbell, and Brian Swenlin; Storyboarded by : John Norton, David Schwartz, and Wendell Washer	Phineas Sharp	February 24, 1992	4308-002
A nefarious criminal from the past returns, to profit by auctioning off a complete list of all of S.H.U.S.H.'s secret agents. J. Gander teams up Darkwing with the legendary Derek Blunt to intercept the documents before they fall into the wrong hands.: Title Reference: In Like Flint; Note: Steelbeak and Ammonia Pine, and Magica De Spell, the Beagle Boys, and Flintheart Glomgold from DuckTales make non-speaking cameo appearances.; Absent: Gosalyn
51	51	"Quack of Ages"	Carole Beers and Bob Treat	Written by : Joe Olson; Storyboarded by : Sharon Forward, Jan Green, Jim McLean, and Kathleen Carr	Quackerjack	February 26, 1992	4308-059
To prevent the invention of the yo-yo, Quackerjack travels back to the medieval land of Canardia. Darkwing and Launchpad follow Quackerjack and find Herb and Binkie as King and Queen of Canardia. Posing as the king's advisor, Quackerjack convicts Darkwing as a warlock.: Title Reference: "Rock of Ages"; Absent: Gosalyn
52	52	"Time and Punishment"	Rick Leon and Toby Shelton	Written by : Dev Ross; Storyboarded by : Jill Colbert, Denise Koyama, David Schwartz, and Lonnie Thompson	Darkwarrior Duck, Megavolt and Quackerjack	February 27, 1992	4308-070
During a battle between Darkwing, Megavolt and Quackerjack, Gosalyn ends up aboard the villains' Time Top, just before it starts up and takes them to the future. Gosalyn finds out that Darkwing has become Darkwarrior Duck, who enforces the law with an iron fist.: Title Reference: Crime and Punishment; Note: Some various villains make cameo appearance.
53	53	"Stressed to Kill"	Vincente Bassols and Mitch Rochon	Written by : Doug Langdale; Storyboarded by : Carin-Anne Anderson, Karl Gnass, Roy Shishido, and David Williams	Megavolt and Quackerjack	March 3, 1992	4308-066
Darkwing is constantly getting stressed, so he goes to a stress-free clinic (which is being run by Megavolt and Quackerjack), and they brainwash him. Now he is too calm (not even Gosalyn destroying the house can get him mad) when Megavolt and QuackerJack start a fire that soon starts to spread throughout the whole city, Launchpad and Gosalyn have to try to get DW out of his repressed state.: Title Reference: Dressed to Kill
54	54	"The Darkwing Squad"	Carole Beers and Dale Case	Written by : Dev Ross; Storyboarded by : Victor Cook and John Flagg	Steelbeak	April 1992	4308-071
J. Gander asks DW to train some of S.H.U.S.H.'s agents. It does not go over well with Agent Gryzlikoff, who joins F.O.W.L. as a double agent. Steelbeak sets a trap for the newly titled "Darkwing Squad" while Gryzlikoff faces off against Darkwing.: Absent: Gosalyn
55	55	"Inside Binkie's Brain"	Rick Leon and Toby Shelton	Written by : Doug Langdale; Storyboarded by : Kurt Anderson, Karl Gnass, Chris Rutkowski, and Llyn Hunter	Megavolt	April 1992	4308-072
When Binkie Muddlefoot gets hit on the head by a bowling ball, her inner "little hero" escapes and causes her to become the Canardian Guardian. Her endless quest for safety endangers Darkwing's life as he tries once again to capture Megavolt.: Absent: Gosalyn
56	56	"The Haunting of Mr. Banana Brain"	Dale Case and John Kimball	Written by : Dev Ross; Storyboarded by : Karl Gnass, Craig Kemplin, Denise Koyama, Phil Weinstein, and David Schwartz	Quackerjack and Paddywhack	April 29, 1992	4308-073
When Gosalyn gets into mischief, a spirit named Paddywhack is unleashed from a jack-in-the-box and possesses Quackerjack's doll, Mr. Banana Brain. As he causes trouble alongside Quackerjack, he grows, feeding from the negative emotions around himself.
57	57	"Slime Okay, You're Okay"	Marsh Lamore and Rick Leon	Written by : Gordon Bressack; Storyboarded by : John Flagg and Lonnie Thompson	Bushroot and Hedgy	May 1992	4308-074
Bushroot creates a formula, intending to create an intelligent plant friend, and Gosalyn ends up sampling it. Now Darkwing has a limited amount of time to find a cure before Gosalyn melts into a pile of goo.: Title Reference: I'm Okay – You're Okay
58	58	"Whirled History"	Carole Beers, Rick Leon, Mircea Mantta, and Mitch Rochon	Written by : Doug Langdale; Storyboarded by : Kurt Anderson and Chris Rutkowski	Megavolt	May 1992	4308-077
Forced to work on her boring history assignment, Gosalyn dozes off, and begins sleepwalking. She dreams herself with AstroDuck, a television show character, trying to find the Fountain of Knowledge. While she is learning about famous explorers in her dreams, Megavolt uses her as bait to trap and kill Darkwing in the real world.
59	59	"U.F. Foe"	Rick Leon and Bob Shellhorn	Written by : Dev Ross; Storyboarded by : Karl Gnass, Craig Kemplin, David Schwartz, and Phil Weinstein	Bleeb	May 1992	4308-076
Aliens kidnap Launchpad to make him ruler of the universe.
60	60	"A Star is Scorned"	Dale Case and John Kimball	Written by : Haskell Barkin and Tad Stones; Storyboarded by : Craig Kemplin, David Schwartz, and Phil Weinstein	E. Thaddeus Rockwell and Bushroot	May 1992	4308-081
Darkwing's human producer feels that the Darkwing Duck television show needs a new gimmick in the form of a spin-off character, which might really be Darkwing's replacement by Bushroot. The scheme is actually a scam by the producer to steal money from the show, since it is much cheaper to have a plant such as Bushroot as the main star than an actor such as Darkwing. Herb and Binke Muddlefoot are actors who act out of character ruthless business tycoons due to a hidden clause in their acting contract that "The Studio is always Right". The Muddlefoots and Bushroot get to ride in a limousine which Darkwing and Gosalyn have to sneak in the studio disguised as Donald Duck and Louie Duck.: Title Reference: A Star Is Born; Absent: Launchpad
61	61	"The Quiverwing Quack"	Rick Leon and Bob Shellhorn	Written by : Dev Ross; Storyboarded by : Kurt Anderson, Carin-Anne Anderson, and Chris Rutkowski	Negaduck	May 16, 1992	4308-078
Gosalyn takes up archery, and bests Negaduck with it. Against Darkwing's wishes, she creates her alter-ego – the Quiverwing Quack – and causes a stir of publicity. She also becomes Negaduck's new target – so he can regain his position as Public Enemy #1.
62	62	"Jail Bird"	Rick Leon and Bob Shellhorn	Written by : Doug Langdale and Michael Maurer; Storyboarded by : Karl Gnass, Larry Scholl, and David Schwartz	The Fearsome Five	May 17, 1992	4308-080
Negaduck steals a diamond that can steal other people's powers. After he steals the powers from Bushroot, Megavolt, the Liquidator and Quackerjack, they have to use their weaknesses to stop Mega-Negaduck.: Note: Gosalyn appears but does not speak.
63	63	"Dirtysomething"	Dale Case and John Kimball	Written by : Katie Kuch and Cheryl Scarborough; Storyboarded by : John Flagg, Craig Kemplin, Roy Wilson, and Colin Baker	Ammonia Pine and Ample Grime	May 18, 1992	4308-082
It's Ammonia Pine's worst nightmare. FOWL has teamed her with her polar opposite, her filth-loving sister, Ample Grime. It would be easy for Darkwing Duck to stop them. But Gosalyn, not having enough allowance to buy a video game, has discovered that she can cash in whatever she recycles… including the Thunderquack's engine, the Ratcatcher, a few gas guns, etc.: Title Reference: Thirtysomething
64	64	"Kung Fooled"	Rick Leon, Bob Shellhorn, and James T. Walker	Written by : Victor Cook and George Johnston; Storyboarded by : Kurt Anderson, Carin-Anne Anderson, Victor Cook, Craig Kemplin, Chris Rutkowski, and Phil Weinstein	Moliarty and Goose Lee	May 19, 1992	4308-075
Darkwing chases Moliarty to the city Kung Pow where he meets up with his old martial arts instructor, Master Lee.
65	65	"Bad Luck Duck"	Dale Case and John Kimball	Written by : Michael Maurer; Storyboarded by : Roy Wilson, Kurt Anderson, and Colin Baker	Negaduck	May 20, 1992	4308-079
Darkwing Duck is accused of stealing a tribe's jewel and the leader puts a curse on him. Now they have to get it back from Negaduck and stop him from using it. But where is the leader to get the curse off?

=== Season 1 — ABC episodes (1991) ===
No. overall	No. in season	Title	Directed by	Written by	Villain(s)	Original release date	Prod. code
66	1	"That Sinking Feeling"	John Kimball and Bob Zamboni	Written by : Tad Stones; Storyboarded by : Kurt Anderson and Hank Tucker	Moliarty	September 7, 1991; Disney Channel preview: April 7, 1991	4308-007
Moliarty, the fiendish genius marketer and mole from the deep underground, has rallied his fellow race for an attack to take over the surface city of St. Canard. Stealing buildings, he creates a beam to lock the moon in an eternal eclipse to plunge everything in darkness.
67	2	"Film Flam"	Carole Beers and David Brain	Written by : Bruce Reid Schaefer; Storyboarded by : Victor Cook, Larry Eikleberry, and David Schwartz	Tuskernini	September 14, 1991	4308-034
Tuskernini utilizes a special camera gun to pull characters directly out of movies and into the real world. As director of a specially crafted criminal force, he takes them out on the town to do his bidding.
68	3	"Negaduck"	Carole Beers and Tom Ray	Written by : Steve Roberts; Storyboarded by : Ryan Anthony, Rich Chidlaw, James McLean, and David Prince	Megavolt, Negaduck (negatron version)	September 21, 1991; Disney Channel preview: July 6, 1991	4308-025
Darkwing Duck is zapped with Megavolt's tronsplitter, separating his good side from his bad. Another zap with the two sides will restore him to normal, but his negative side is certain not to let that happen. Debut of the original "negatron version" of Negaduck.
69	4	"Fungus Amongus"	Marsh Lamore and Rick Leon	Written by : Dev Ross; Storyboarded by : Lonnie Thompson, Kurt Anderson, and Viki Anderson	Morgana MacCawber and her board of directors	September 28, 1991	4308-010
While investigating pizza topping crimes, Darkwing falls for a beautiful, creepy villainess called Morgana MacCawber.: Absent: Gosalyn
70	5	"Slaves to Fashion"	Carole Beers and Terence Harrison	Written by : Gary Sperling; Storyboarded by : Rich Chidlaw, Victor Cook, Larry Eikleberry, and Roy Wilson	Tuskernini	October 5, 1991	4308-037
Under Binkie Muddlefoot's advice, Drake decides Gosalyn should act more like a "lady". Meanwhile, Tuskernini develops a spray that makes people act the way they are dressed and targets the rich citizens attending the school masquerade party.
71	6	"Something Fishy"	Marsh Lamore and Rick Leon	Written by : Steve Sustarsic; Storyboarded by : Jan Green and Steve Gordon	Neptunia	October 12, 1991	4308-028
A day at the beach gets turned upside down when the gang has to deal with attacks from sea creatures. In comes Neptunia, who is sick of the pollution that was dumped in the sea and caused her to mutate. She plans revenge by flooding the city of St. Canard.
72	7	"Tiff of the Titans"	John Kimball and Bob Zamboni	Written by : Len Uhley; Storyboarded by : Kurt Anderson, Viki Anderson, and Lonnie Thompson	Steelbeak	October 19, 1991	4308-032
Fenton Crackshell, alias the crime-fighting Gizmoduck, heads to St. Canard in pursuit of Steelbeak. The F.O.W.L. agent soon finds out and frames Darkwing so Gizmoduck will think he's evil. The two fight it out, while Steelbeak tries to steal a new, top-secret weapon, the EGRT (Experimental General Retalitory Transport).
73	8	"Calm a Chameleon"	Marsh Lamore and Rick Leon	Written by : Dean Stefan; Storyboarded by : Viki Anderson, Thom Enriquez, and Lonnie Thompson	Camille Chameleon	October 26, 1991	4308-030
The shapeshifting villainess Chameleon plots to take control of the Howl publishing empire so she can print her own money. Honker undergoes a personality transformation when he is bullied at school.
74	9	"Battle of the Brainteasers"	Carole Beers and Terence Harrison	Written by : Kevin Campbell and Brian Swenlin; Storyboarded by : Ryan Anthony, Larry Eikleberry, and Dale Schott	The Brainteasers	November 2, 1991; Disney Channel preview: June 8, 1991	4308-009
Alien hats invade earth, take control of a slew of nuclear weapons, and demand to be made rulers of the universe. Debut of Flarg, Barada and Nikto.: Story Reference: King Klaatu and two of the villains are named after the phrase "klaatu barada nikto" from The Day the Earth Stood Still
75	10	"Bad Tidings"	Vincente Bassols, Carole Beers, and Bob Treat	Written by : Gary Klein and Dean Stefan; Storyboarded by : Jill Colbert, Victor Cook, Sharon Forward, and David Schwartz	Steelbeak and F.O.W.L.	November 9, 1991	4308-038
F.O.W.L. is at it again. The fiendish organization is in control of the tides themselves. J. Gander Hooter teams up Darkwing and Gryzlikoff to foil the plot, and they end up fighting amongst themselves rather than getting to the bottom of things.: Absent: Launchpad and Gosalyn
76	11	"Going Nowhere Fast"	Carole Beers, David Brain, and Bob Shellhorn	Written by : Gary Sperling; Storyboarded by : Sharon Forward and David Schwartz	Negaduck	November 16, 1991	4308-057
Negaduck zaps Darkwing with a particle accelerator, unknowingly giving him super speed. Unfortunately, DW soon learns the major side effect – increased aging. With Darkwing old and decrepit, Negaduck easily takes control of the city.
77	12	"A Brush with Oblivion"	Carole Beers, Terence Harrison, and Mitch Rochon	Written by : Mirith Schilder; Storyboarded by : Rich Chidlaw, Jim McLean, and David Prince	Splatter Phoenix	November 23, 1991	4308-022
Honker notices a villainess named Splatter Phoenix making her way through the museum by way of the paintings. When Honker tries to tell people about it, no one believes him. Mostly his parents punish him for going crazy. Gosalyn gets involved and ends up stuck in a painting. At the end Honker was telling the truth about Splatter Phoenix and Splatter has been arrested and Honker punishment has been overturned by his parents.
78	13	"The Merchant of Menace"	Carole Beers and Terence Harrison	Written by : Peter Hastings; Storyboarded by : Ryan Anthony, Sharon Forward and Roy Shishido	Weasel Lowman	November 30, 1991	4308-035
When Quackerware comes to life, S.H.U.S.H. thinks Herb Muddlefoot is behind it. Drake investigates by joining in on Herb's Quackerware sales route.: Title Reference: The Merchant of Venice; Absent: Gosalyn

=== Season 2 (1992) ===
No. overall	No. in season	Title	Directed by	Written by	Villain(s)	Original release date	Prod. code
79	1	"Monsters R Us"	Dale Case, John Kimball, Rick Leon, and Bob Shellhorn	Written by : Michael Maurer; Storyboarded by : Carin-Anne Anderson and Kurt Anderson	Monoculo MacCawber and the villagers	September 12, 1992	4308-085
Morgana introduces Darkwing to her relatives – who are upset to find out that she is dating a "normal" (or as normal as Darkwing can be in comparison).
80	2	"Inherit the Wimp"	Dale Case and John Kimball	Written by : Gordon Bressack; Storyboarded by : Larry Scholl, Roy Shishido, Dale Case, and John Kimball	Megavolt	September 19, 1992	4308-084
Helping with Gosalyn's homework, Darkwing shows her famous Mallards from history. She sneaks back into time with Quackerjack's timetop and brings them to the present. None of them seem to be as great as they were thought to be. When Megavolt steals Darkwing and Launchpad's nervous energy, the failures have a chance to prove they are heroes at heart.
81	3	"The Revenge of the Return of the Brainteasers, Too!"	Dale Case and John Kimball	Written by : Charlie Howell; Storyboarded by : Karl Gnass, David Schwartz, and Chris Rutkowski	The Brainteasers	September 26, 1992	4308-083
Honker has become a galactic hero after foiling Flog and his companions from ruling the galaxy (in Battle of the Brainteasers). The body-stealing alien hats break free from captivity, bent once again to rule or destroy the universe – with a grudge against the young genius.
82	4	"Star Crossed Circuits"	John Kimball and Rick Leon	Written by : Bill Motz and Robert Roth; Storyboarded by : Karl Gnass and David Schwartz	D-2000	October 3, 1992	4308-086
D.W. gets the D-2000 supercomputer. While it seems to be perfect, Launchpad feels it's replacing him as a sidekick, and Gosalyn is fed up with not getting away with anything and introduces it to Launchpad's soap operas. Soon, even Darkwing wants the machine gone when it falls in love with him. Darkwing finally tells the computer system it's getting unplugged when he gets to the tower, at which point it goes berserk and decides that if it can't have D.W. no one else will.
83	5	"Steerminator"	Rick Leon	Written by : Tad Stones and Dev Ross; Storyboarded by : Kurt Anderson and Chris Rutkowski	Taurus Bulba, Steelbeak and F.O.W.L.	October 10, 1992	4308-089
F.O.W.L. rebuilds Taurus Bulba into a death machine, hoping to create a new agent from him. Bulba refuses their offer and burns only with the desire to have revenge on Darkwing, which includes kidnapping Gosalyn and Honker. To make matters worse, a recent accident has Darkwing in a wheelchair. Can he defeat a new and improved Terminator machine and rescue the kids in his condition?: Title Reference: Terminator
84	6	"The Frequency Fiends"	John Kimball	Written by : Bill Motz and Robert Roth; Storyboarded by : Victor Cook and John Flagg	Megavolt, Heatwave, Lightwave and Radiowave	October 17, 1992	4308-091
Darkwing's new weapon hits Gosalyn. Although she's perfectly fine, three new beings are created, all of which look like Gosalyn, but have powers based on different frequencies: Heatwave (Red), Lightwave (Yellow), and Radiowave (Green). D.W. enlists Megavolt help, but an untrusting Darkwing messes things up. Now the three Frequency Fiends are combined into one super-being, and it's up to the combined efforts of D.W., Launchpad, Goz, and Megavolt to stop them.
85	7	"Paint Misbehavin' "	John Kimball	Written by : Matt Uitz; Storyboarded by : Rich Chidlaw, Roy Shishido, and Roy Wilson	Splatter Phoenix	October 24, 1992	4308-090
Darkwing is to appear as the guest of honor at a comic book convention, while Splatter Phoenix terrorizes the town by "improving" boring art.: Title Reference: "Ain't Misbehavin'"
86	8	"Hot Spells"	Rick Leon	Written by : John Behnke, Rob Humphrey, Jim Peterson; Storyboarded by : Larry Scholl, Llyn Hunter, Victor Cook, Craig Kemplin, and Phil Weinstein	Beelzebub	October 31, 1992	4308-092
Darkwing and Gosalyn go with Morgana to her old magic school, where she is to present her thesis paper. Gosalyn tries to find a shortcut to learning magic. Beelzebub tricks Gosalyn into casting a spell that sends Darkwing into hell where he is confronted with his worst nightmare-spending eternity with the Muddlefoots.: Notes: This is the only episode of the series that has been banned from airing again after its initial broadcast because of its religiously sensitive subject matter, and is the only episode not released on home media in the US, being unavailable for purchase on the iTunes Store and Google TV, and is unavailable to stream on Disney+. The Magic Brooms from Fantasia's "The Sorcerer's Apprentice" make a cameo.; Absent: Launchpad
87	9	"Fraudcast News"	John Kimball and Jang-Gil Kim	Written by : Bill Motz and Robert Roth; Storyboarded by : Denise Koyama, Albert Ring, Rick Morrison, and John Flagg	The Bugmaster (Bianca Beakley)	November 7, 1992	4308-095
A news reporter wants to film Darkwing Duck on his cases. But she thinks what Darkwing is doing is too boring. So she becomes a villain for DW to fight to boost her ratings. Will DW be canceled permanently?: Title Reference: Broadcast News
88	10	"Clash Reunion"	John Kimball	Written by : Bill Motz and Robert Roth; Storyboarded by : Victor Cook and John Flagg	Megavolt	November 14, 1992	4308-094
Drake attends his high school reunion, but it turns out that Megavolt is also a member of his class and is looking for revenge.
89	11	"Mutantcy on the Bouncy"	Rick Leon and Richard Trueblood	Written by : Michael Maurer; Storyboarded by : Karl Gnass, David Schwartz, and Roy Shishido	Cement Head	November 21, 1992	4308-093
Gosalyn, working for her school newspaper, covers the three way battle between the Rubber Chicken, Cement-head and Darkwing Duck.: Title Reference: Mutiny on the Bounty
90	12	"Malice's Restaurant"	John Kimball and Rick Leon	Written by : Matt Uitz; Storyboarded by : Karl Gnass, Larry Scholl, and Chris Rutkowski	Negaduck	December 5, 1992	4308-097
Morgana opens up a new restaurant, but Darkwing forgets to cancel the guests coming to Morgana's Restaurant: The Cute Little Lost Bunnies. Meanwhile, Negaduck plans to turn the C.L.L.B. evil.: Title Reference: "Alice's Restaurant"
91	13	"Extinct Possibility"	Rick Leon and Richard Trueblood	Written by : Tad Stones and Dev Ross; Storyboarded by : Ron Campbell, Chris Rutkowski, and Albert Ring	Johnny T. Rex, Throttle and Mudflap	December 12, 1992	4308-096
Darkwing is asked to investigate a mysterious museum discovery – Darkwing himself encased in amber. To solve the mystery of the unusual specimen, Darkwing uses Quackerjack's timetop to travel to the prehistoric past.

== See also ==
- DuckTales
