= The Little Mermaid (TV series) =

American animated television series

- Genre: Animated series; Adventure; Musical; Children's television series; Comedy; Fantasy
- Based on: The Little Mermaid by Hans Christian Andersen; The Little Mermaid by Walt Disney Feature Animation
- Developed by: Jamie Mitchell
- Directed by: Jamie Mitchell; Mircea Mantta (#2–5)
- Voices of: Jodi Benson; Edan Gross; Samuel E. Wright; Maurice LaMarche; Kenneth Mars; Danny Cooksey; Jim Cummings; Pat Carroll
- Theme music composer: Dan Foliart; Mark Watters
- Opening theme: "Part of Your World", "Under the Sea", and "Kiss the Girl"
- Ending theme: "Under the Sea"
- Composers: Dan Foliart; Mark Watters
- Country of origin: United States
- Original language: English
- No. of seasons: 3
- No. of episodes: 31

Production
- Producer: Jamie Mitchell
- Editor: Elen Orson
- Running time: 22 minutes (1,300 s)
- Production company: Walt Disney Television Animation

Original release
- Network: CBS
- Release: September 11, 1992 – November 26, 1994

Related
- The Little Mermaid; The Little Mermaid II: Return to the Sea; The Little Mermaid: Ariel's Beginning

The Little Mermaid is an American animated television series produced by Walt Disney Television Animation based on the 1989 animated film. It follows the adventures of Ariel as a mermaid before the events of the film. This series is the third Disney television series to be spun off from a major animated film. Some of the voice actors of the film reprise their roles in the series, among them Jodi Benson as Ariel, Samuel E. Wright as Sebastian, Kenneth Mars as King Triton, and Pat Carroll as Ursula. Other voice actors include Edan Gross as Flounder, and Jeff Bennett as Prince Eric.

The Little Mermaid premiered on September 11, 1992, with the animated prime time special called "A Whale of a Tale," then moved to Saturday mornings. This series originally appeared on CBS, with an original run from September 11, 1992, to November 26, 1994. Some of the episodes contain musical segments, featuring original songs written for the series. The opening theme to the show is an instrumental combination of the songs "Part of Your World," "Under the Sea," and "Kiss the Girl." The overture for the 2007 stage musical of The Little Mermaid is similar to this.

== Premise ==
The Little Mermaid is a prequel to the movie of the same name. The story is set before the Disney's 1989 animated feature film, and follows Ariel's adventures as a mermaid still living under the sea with her father King Triton, Sebastian the crab and Flounder the fish. Various episodes highlight her relationships with her friends, father and sisters, and usually involve Ariel foiling the attempts of various enemies that intend ill harm to her, her family and friends, or her kingdom. Ariel's Beginning contains events that contradict the television series (such as Ariel's youth and first meeting with Flounder), making the TV series and the prequel independent continuities.

== Production and development ==
After the success of Disney's 1989 animated feature film, The Walt Disney Company planned to produce a children's television series for its Disney Channel cable outlet called The Little Mermaid's Island. The proposed series would feature puppets from Jim Henson's Creature Shop interacting with a "live" Ariel. But after Jim Henson's untimely death along with production difficulties and as the video release of The Little Mermaid soared in sales during 1990 and early 1991, Disney quietly dropped plans for "The Little Mermaid's Island" in favor of a more ambitious plan: an animated weekly series for CBS. The new show would be about the adventures of Ariel and her friends before the events in the film.

Jamie Mitchell, an artist and graphic designer who worked on Disney's Adventures of the Gummi Bears, was named the producer and director of the new series. Patsy Cameron and Tedd Anasti were the story editors and wrote almost all of the episodes for the show's second and third seasons. Their previous joint work included Hanna-Barbera's The Smurfs, the animated Beetlejuice and Disney's DuckTales. Some of the artists and technicians on the feature film also contributed to the TV series. Mark Dindal, chief of special animated effects for the film, was a consultant for special effects on the TV show. Robby Merkin, who worked with Alan Menken and Howard Ashman on arranging the songs for the film, worked as the arranger and music producer for the first season of the TV show.

Disney Animation Japan and Wang Film Productions in Taiwan both contributed animation to the series.

== Episodes ==
=== Series overview ===
| Season | Episodes | Originally released | |
| Season | Episodes | First released | Last released |
|---|---|---|---|
| 1 | 14 | September 11, 1992 | December 5, 1992 |
| 2 | 9 | September 18, 1993 | December 11, 1993 |
| 3 | 8 | September 17, 1994 | November 26, 1994 |

=== Season 1 (1992) ===
| No. overall | No. in season | Title | Animation directed by | Written by | Storyboarded by | Original release date | Prod. code |
|---|---|---|---|---|---|---|---|
| 1 | 1 | "Whale of a Tale" | Takeshi Atomura, Madoka Yasue, Hisashi Wada & Hiroshi Kawamata | Peter S. Beagle | George Goode, Lonnie Lloyd, Todd Kurosawa, Floro Dery, Holly Forsyth & John Dorman | September 11, 1992 | 1 (4313-007) |
Ariel becomes friends with and adopts a baby killer whale named Spot that was separated from his family because of human poachers. She, Flounder and eventually Sebastian try to keep Spot's existence a secret, but eventually King Triton finds out when Spot crashes Sebastian's Spring performance. King Triton insists that he be sent away once he has been taught how to survive on his own. Ariel, Sebastian and Flounder try to get the friendly Spot to act aggressive, to no avail. The solution rears its ugly head when sharks attack Ariel and her friends, prompting Spot to find the courage to save Ariel and defeat the sharks. In the end, Spot is reunited with his pod and says a fond goodbye to Ariel. Notes: This is the pilot episode. The title is a reference to "A Whale of a Tale" from the film 20,000 Leagues Under the Sea. Music: "Just a Little Love", performed by Jodi Benson and "You've Got to Be You", performed by Samuel E. Wright.
| 2 | 2 | "The Great Sebastian" | Dale Case | Patsy Cameron & Tedd Anasti | Holly Forsyth, John Dorman & George Goode | September 12, 1992 | 2 (4313-001) |
Sebastian tells Triton that he is capable of making a deal with the Sharkanians (a race of shark-like merpeople with an attitude to match), but in truth, he is petrified of them and Ariel and Flounder must tag along to help him make the process go smoothly.
| 3 | 3 | "Stormy" | Russell E. Mooney & Mitch Rochon | Patsy Cameron & Tedd Anasti | Floro Dery & David Smith | September 19, 1992 | 3 (4313-002) |
Ariel rides a wild sea horse named Stormy against her father's wishes and gets lost in the wilderness with Stormy. Music: "The Edge of the Edge of the Sea", performed by Jodi Benson.
| 4 | 4 | "Urchin" | Terence Harrison | Patsy Cameron & Tedd Anasti | Lonnie Lloyd, John Dorman, Frank Nissen, Victor Cook, Holly Forsyth & George Goode | September 26, 1992 | 4 (4313-003) |
Ariel became friends with an orphaned merboy who has fallen in with the underwater gangster 'the Lobster Mobster' and his sidekick 'Da Shrimp' (Note: this is the first appearance of Urchin). Music: "The Lobster Mobster's Mob", performed by Joe Alaskey and David Lander.
| 5 | 5 | "Double Bubble" | Russell E. Mooney | Marie Sager, Laraine Arkow & David Schwartz | Holly Forsyth, George Goode, Todd Kurosawa, John Flagg & Phil Weinstein | October 3, 1992 | 5 (4313-004) |
Ariel babysits two mischievous mertwins. As lively as the twins are, matters are complicated by the Lobster Mobster, who kidnaps the twins to gain their mother's pearl necklace. Music: "Beddie-Bye Blues", performed by Joe Alaskey and David Lander.
| 6 | 6 | "Message in a Bottle" | Russell E. Mooney & Bob Shellhorn | Lynn Lefler | John Dorman, John Flagg, Frank Nissen, Albert Ring & Robert Souza | October 10, 1992 | 6 (4313-005) |
Ariel befriends Simon, a lonely sea dragon after she, Sebastian and Flounder discover his message that he sent in a bottle. Music: "Sing a New Song", performed by Jodi Benson and Brian Cummings.
| 7 | 7 | "Charmed" | Russell E. Mooney & Bob Shellhorn | James A. Markovich, Patsy Cameron & Tedd Anasti | Floro Dery, Frank Nissen & Lonnie Lloyd | October 17, 1992 | 9 (4313-008) |
Ariel puts on a human bracelet, but finds it hard to take it off afterwards. Afraid of how her father would react when he sees her wearing a human thing, she runs away from home and goes off to find the key to the lock of the bracelet. However, the moment that she finds it, a giant whirlpool traps her in a horrible underwater cave.
| 8 | 8 | "Marriage of Inconvenience" | Russell E. Mooney & Bob Shellhorn | Chris Weber & Karen Willson | Robert Souza, Lonnie Lloyd & Ritsuko Notani | October 24, 1992 | 10 (4313-009) |
Ariel believes her father King Triton is setting her up for an arranged marriage with a snobbish merman-prince of another sea kingdom of Olympia named Prince Thor, and her good friends go to great lengths to prevent this from happening.
| 9 | 9 | "The Evil Manta" | Russell E. Mooney & Bob Shellhorn | Tony Marino, Patsy Cameron & Tedd Anasti | Floro Dery, Mark Dindal, John Dorman, George Goode & Ritsuko Notani | October 31, 1992 | 7 (4313-011) |
Ariel accidentally frees a dark figure known as the Evil Manta, who tries to take over Atlantica using deception and lies to turn its merpeople and the sea creatures against each other. To make things even worse, he even tries to turn Flounder against Ariel. Music: "In Harmony", performed by Jodi Benson.
| 10 | 10 | "Thingamajigger" | Russell E. Mooney | Chuck Menville | John Dorman, Holly Forsyth, Todd Kurosawa & Ritsuko Notani | November 7, 1992 | 8 (4313-006) |
When a pirate's boot falls into the sea, Ariel, Sebastian and Flounder try to figure out what it is, culminating in the Lobster Mobster and the Evil Manta both mistaking it for a weapon. Note: This marks the very first appearances of Ariel's romantic interest and human lover, Prince Eric, and his dog Max (as a puppy) in the TV series. Note 2: This episode was dedicated to Chuck Menville, a writer who died before the episode aired.
| 11 | 11 | "Red" | Russell E. Mooney | Emily Swass | Todd Kurosawa, George Goode, Frank Nissen & Jamie Diaz | November 14, 1992 | 12 (4313-012) |
A magic spell turns King Triton into a young and energetic merboy, and Ariel has to play "mother" to him. Music: "Dis is de Life", performed by Samuel E. Wright.
| 12 | 12 | "Beached" | Russell E. Mooney | Alicia Marie Schudt | Floro Dery, Jamie Diaz & Lonnie Lloyd | November 21, 1992 | 13 (4313-013) |
Before a family trip to the Carnival of Tides on the tide, Ariel and Arista get into a fight and are "beached" (grounded); and Sebastian has to stay and look after them. Two gators attempt to steal the royal treasure. Ariel and Arista not only learn more about each other and have an adventure together, but they also learn to work together and to get along.
| 13 | 13 | "Trident True" | Marsh Lamore & Russell E. Mooney | Tony Marino | Robert Souza & Frank Nissen | November 28, 1992 | 14 (4313-014) |
Ariel looks for the perfect Father's Day gift to give to King Triton, but it leads her to misfortune when a giant octopus traps them in a cave, forcing Urchin to try and steal the trident so that he can save the day.
| 14 | 14 | "Eel-Ectric City" | Marsh Lamore & Russell E. Mooney | Chuck Menville | Jamie Diaz | December 5, 1992 | 11 (4313-010) |
Pearl, a mermaid who is obsessed with partying, takes Ariel and her sixth eldest sister, Alana, to Eel-Ectric City instead of to her house, while Sebastian and Flounder follow. In the end Ariel and Alana are beached (Note: this is Ariel's second time getting beached).

=== Season 2 (1993) ===
| No. overall | No. in season | Title | Animation directed by | Written by | Storyboarded by | Original release date | Prod. code |
|---|---|---|---|---|---|---|---|
| 15 | 1 | "Resigned to It" | Mircea Mantta | Patsy Cameron & Tedd Anasti | Holly Forsyth, Ritsuko Notani, Debra Pugh, Hank Tucker & John Flagg | September 18, 1993 | 15 (4313-015) |
Sebastian quits his job as King Triton's royal confidant and advisor and tries to make a new life for himself. At the same time, the dreaded Red Tide returns and threatens to consume all of Atlantica. Music: "You Know I Know", performed by Samuel E. Wright and "Never Give Up", performed by Jodi Benson and Samuel E. Wright.
| 16 | 2 | "Calliope Dreams" | Mircea Mantta & Dale Case | Patsy Cameron & Tedd Anasti | John Dorman & Frank Nissen | September 25, 1993 | 16 (4313-016) |
King Triton wants Ariel to play the sea calliope: an instrument resembling an organ. However, she instead wants to play the new harp she found. The music from the calliope awakens the Seaclops. It is up to Ariel and friends to find a way to put the Seaclops to sleep again. In this episode, Wolfgang Amadeus Mozart has a cameo appearance. King Triton's paternal grandfather (Ariel's great-grandfather) also appears for the first time, and Pearl makes her third appearance.
| 17 | 3 | "Save the Whale!" | Mircea Mantta | Dev Ross & Laraine Arkow | Floro Dery, John Flagg & George Goode | October 2, 1993 | 19 (4313-019) |
Spot, the killer whale from the pilot episode, returns. Spot and Sebastian get captured by a crazed circus owner, and Ariel has to save them.
| 18 | 4 | "Against the Tide" | Mircea Mantta, Dale Case & Rick Leon | Patsy Cameron & Tedd Anasti | Holly Forsyth, Debra Pugh & Shawna Cha | October 9, 1993 | 18 (4313-018) |
Ariel rescues a Bad-Luck Creature named Lucky, putting all of Atlantica in a panic, and must make her own luck when Ursula comes after the creature after her potions have been backfiring countless times. Music: "You Wouldn't Want to Mess with Me", performed by Pat Carroll.
| 19 | 5 | "Giggles" | Mircea Mantta, Dale Case & Barbara Dourmaskin-Case | Patsy Cameron & Tedd Anasti | Carin-Anne Anderson, John Dorman, Frank Nissen & Hank Tucker | October 16, 1993 | 17 (4313-017) |
A grumpy sorcerer blowfish's magic spell causes Ariel to create sea quakes whenever she laughs, then Flounder and Sebastian turn into a shark, a killer whale, a giant squid and a humpback whale, and then swap bodies. Music: "The Sound of Laughter", performed by Samuel E. Wright.
| 20 | 6 | "Wish Upon a Starfish" | Mircea Mantta & Barbara Dourmaskin-Case | Patsy Cameron & Tedd Anasti | Floro Dery, John Flagg, Debra Pugh & Mike Sosnowski | October 23, 1993 | 20 (4313-020) |
A big wave grabs a ballerina music box during a thunderstorm, and Ariel, Flounder, and Sebastian try to get it, but it is unable to reach; later, Ariel wishes she had two tails to dance ballet like the music box. Ariel befriends a mute Latina mermaid named Gabriella, who dreams of becoming a singer, and both of them decide to seek out the magical Wishing Starfish (voiced by Tony Jay) to make their dreams come true. (Note: this is the first appearance of Gabriella. Also, the title is a play on "When You Wish Upon a Star" from the Disney animated film Pinocchio). Music: "Daring to Dance", performed by Jodi Benson.
| 21 | 7 | "Tail of Two Crabs" | Mircea Mantta & Barbara Dourmaskin-Case | Patsy Cameron & Tedd Anasti | Holly Forsyth, John Dorman, Debra Pugh & Carin-Anne Anderson | October 30, 1993 | 21 (4313-021) |
Sebastian feels threatened by Zeus, an old arch-rival crab who is better than him at everything, while Ursula works on a plan to turn Triton, Ariel, and others into sea polyps by using a magic stone (Note: this episode is a parody of A Tale of Two Cities by Charles Dickens).
| 22 | 8 | "Metal Fish" | Mircea Mantta | Story by : Thomas Mitchell; Teleplay by : Patsy Cameron & Tedd Anasti | Floro Dery, Holly Forsyth & Carin-Anne Anderson | November 6, 1993 | 22 (4313-022) |
A human explorer-known in the episode as the author of the original The Little Mermaid story, Hans Christian Andersen-boards a primitive submarine to explore the undersea realm, and crosses paths with Ariel when his submarine is damaged and starts to leak. Note: this episode ends with Kenneth Mars, the voice of King Triton, telling children a message that Hans Christian Andersen wrote the original story and to find his books at your local library.
| 23 | 9 | "T'ank You for Dat, Ariel" | Jamie Mitchell, Barbara Dourmaskin-Case & Terence Harrison | Tedd Anasti & Patsy Cameron | Holly Forsyth, John Dorman, Floro Dery & Carin-Anne Anderson | December 11, 1993 | 23 (4313-023) |
Ariel enters a magic cave to become a sea witch and uses her newfound magical abilities to make Sebastian a great big crab. Unfortunately, she is not quite specific about the size she wishes Sebastian to attain, thus causing quite a commotion wherever he goes.

=== Season 3 (1994) ===
| No. overall | No. in season | Title | Animation directed by | Written by | Storyboarded by | Original release date | Prod. code |
|---|---|---|---|---|---|---|---|
| 24 | 1 | "Scuttle" | Mircea Mantta, Barbara Dourmaskin-Case & Jamie Mitchell | Tedd Anasti & Patsy Cameron | Floro Dery, John Dorman & David Smith | September 17, 1994 | 24 (4313-024) |
Ariel meets Scuttle for the first time and must use his help to rescue Sebastian from a gang of pirates. Note: This marks the second appearance of Prince Eric, and Scuttle's original name is said to be Scuttlebutt, but he changed it. Music: "I Just Like The Sky" and "Just Give Me a Chance", performed by Maurice LaMarche.
| 25 | 2 | "King Crab" | Karen Peterson & Richard Trueblood | Tedd Anasti & Patsy Cameron | John Flagg & Denise Koyama | September 24, 1994 | 26 (4313-026) |
Sebastian realizes that his parents are coming to visit and must try to create a huge scheme to make it appear that he is the king of Atlantica like he wrote in his letters to them.
| 26 | 3 | "Island of Fear" | Mircea Mantta & Barbara Dourmaskin-Case | Tedd Anasti & Patsy Cameron | Floro Dery & Mike Sosnowski | October 1, 1994 | 25 (4313-025) |
A mad scientist captures Sebastian and tries to use him for sinister experiments, while Sebastian bonds with his young apprentice, and it is up to Ariel, Flounder and Scuttle to rescue him.
| 27 | 4 | "Land of the Dinosaurs" | Mircea Mantta & Barbara Dourmaskin-Case | Tedd Anasti & Patsy Cameron | Floro Dery, John Flagg & Mike Sosnowski | October 8, 1994 | 27 (4313-027) |
During a trip to the North Pole, Ariel finds frozen dinosaurs and thaws them with her father's trident. Somehow, they are aquatic and cause chaos before King Triton makes a refuge for them on land.
| 28 | 5 | "Heroes" | Barbara Dourmaskin-Case, Karen Peterson & Rick Leon | Tedd Anasti & Patsy Cameron | Shawna Cha, Karl Gnass & Robert Souza | October 15, 1994 | 28 (4313-028) |
Apollo, a great Atlantican hero, comes to visit, and Ariel wants to go on an adventure with him, only to learn that he is not all that he is cracked up to be.
| 29 | 6 | "The Beast Within" | Barbara Dourmaskin-Case, Karen Peterson & Rick Leon | Tedd Anasti & Patsy Cameron | Jill Colbert, John Dorman & Karl Gnass | October 22, 1994 | 29 (4313-029) |
Flounder gets bitten by a howling hairfish and starts to turn into one, and Sebastian and Urchin get into a fight because Urchin broke Sebastian's trophy that King Triton gave to him for his anniversary by the howling hairfish that bit Flounder.
| 30 | 7 | "Ariel's Treasures" | Mircea Mantta & Barbara Dourmaskin-Case | Emily Dwass | Floro Dery & Karl Gnass | October 29, 1994 | 31 (4313-031) |
Gabriella returns to visit Ariel as she shows her all of her new human things. However, Ursula's spell causes her treasures to go crazy and begin attacking innocent fish and merpeople. Note: Prince Eric makes his third appearance.
| 31 | 8 | "A Little Evil" | Mircea Mantta, Barbara Dourmaskin-Case & Karen Peterson | Tedd Anasti & Patsy Cameron | Jill Colbert, Karl Gnass, Denise Koyama & David Smith | November 26, 1994 | 30 (4313-030) |
The Evil Manta returns and introduces his son, who he wants to be just as evil as he is. Unfortunately, when his son befriends Ariel and goes to the merpeople's school and spends time with her, he starts to get other "good" ideas in his head. Music: "Just Like Me", performed by Tim Curry.

== Release ==
=== Broadcast ===
The show's broadcast debut in September 1992 was in the form of a half-hour prime-time special, The Little Mermaid: A Whale of a Tale. Its Saturday morning debut came the very next day. The show's time slot was 8:30 a.m., following another new animated series, Fievel's American Tails, based on the animated film An American Tail. The Little Mermaid series drew a fair bit of media attention, including more than one spot on Entertainment Tonight, because it was the first series based directly on a Disney animated feature and was a rare (at the time) television cartoon concerning a strong female character. The show kept its time slot the following year with its second season.

For the series' third season, the show was moved to the 8 a.m. time period and was the lead-in for a new Disney animated series, Aladdin. The third season was the final season to be produced; CBS elected not to buy another batch of episodes.

Disney Channel reran the series from October 2, 1995, to September 29, 2002, and again from September 5, 2006, to July 4, 2010. It was also shown on Toon Disney until January 25, 2008. The series then aired on Disney Junior from the channel's launch in 2012 until 2014. However, in Russia, Disney Channel continued to air the series until the channel closed in 2022.

=== Home media ===
==== VHS releases ====
===== North America =====
Seven titles containing a total of 14 episodes of the series were released on VHS in the United States and Canada. Almost simultaneously, three double-feature LaserDiscs containing a total of 12 episodes were also released.

====== Ariel's Undersea Adventures ======
| Title | Episodes | Release date | Catalog number |
|---|---|---|---|
| Whale of a Tale | Whale of a Tale; Urchin | February 26, 1993 | 1664 |
| Stormy, the Wild Seahorse | Stormy; The Great Sebastian | February 26, 1993 | 1665 |
| Double Bubble | Double Bubble; Message in a Bottle | February 26, 1993 | 1666 |
| In Harmony | The Evil Manta; Charmed | November 5, 1993 | 2038 |
| Ariel's Gift | Red; Trident True | November 5, 1993 | 2039 |

====== Princess Collection - Ariel's Songs & Stories ======
| Title | Episodes | Release date | Catalog number |
|---|---|---|---|
| Wish Upon a Starfish | Wish Upon a Starfish; Metal Fish | April 7, 1995 | 4078 |
| Giggles | Giggles; Against the Tide | April 7, 1995 | 4079 |

===== Other territories =====
11 titles containing a total of 22 episodes of the series were released on VHS in Europe, Australia and New Zealand, and South Africa. These titles were also released on VHS, LaserDisc and Video CD in Mexico, South America, and Asia.

====== Ariel's Undersea Adventures ======
| Title | Episodes | Release date |
|---|---|---|
| Whale of a Tale | Whale of a Tale; Urchin | November 26, 1993 |
| Stormy the Wild Seahorse | Stormy; The Great Sebastian | November 26, 1993 |
| Double Bubble | Double Bubble; Message in a Bottle | November 26, 1993 |
| In Harmony | The Evil Manta; Charmed | April 1, 1994 |
| Ariel's Gift | Red; Trident True | April 1, 1994 |
| Ariel the Ballerina | Wish Upon a Starfish; Metal Fish | April 1, 1994 |
| Saltwater Sisters | Beached; Thingmaijigger | April 1, 1994 |

====== Princess Collection - Ariel's Songs & Stories ======
| Title | Episodes | Release date |
|---|---|---|
| Giggles | Giggles; Against the Tide | October 11, 1996 |
| Wish Upon a Starfish | Wish Upon a Starfish; Metal Fish | October 11, 1996 |
| Heroes | Heroes; El-ectric City | March 28, 1997 |
| Tail of Two Crabs | A Little Evil; Tail of Two Crabs | March 28, 1997 |

==== DVD releases ====
The series has not yet been officially released on DVD. However, a total of four episodes were released as part of the following Disney Princess titles, all of which were also available on VHS.

| Title | Episode | Release date | Notes |
|---|---|---|---|
| Disney Princess Party, Volume 1 | "Message in a Bottle" | September 7, 2004 | |
| Disney Princess Stories, Volume 1 | "Wish Upon a Starfish" | September 7, 2004 | |
| Disney Princess Stories, Volume 2 | "Ariel's Treasures" | February 15, 2005 | |
| Disney Princess Stories, Volume 3 | "Giggles" | September 6, 2005 | |

=== Streaming ===
As of August 24, 2018, all 31 episodes of the series are available for purchase on the iTunes Store, and on Amazon Prime Video, in two volumes in High Definition (HD).

The series has been available with the exception of the pilot episode ("Whale of a Tale") through The Walt Disney Company's streaming platform Disney+, since the service's launch on November 12, 2019.

== Songs ==
- "Just a Little Love" (Ariel)
- "You Got to Be You" (Sebastian)
- "To the Edge of the Edge of the Sea" (Ariel)
- "To the Edge of the Edge of the Sea" (Reprise) (Ariel)
- "The Lobster Mobster's Mob" (The Lobster Mobster and Da Shrimp)
- "The Lobster Mobster's Mob "(Reprise) (Da Shrimp)
- "Beddie-Bye Blues" (The Lobster Mobster and Da Shrimp)
- "Sing a New Song" (Ariel and Simon)
- "In Harmony" (Ariel)
- "In Harmony" (Reprise) (Ariel)
- "Dis is de Life" (Sebastian)
- "You Know I Know" (Sebastian)
- "You Know I Know" (Reprise) (Sebastian)
- "Never Give Up" (Ariel and Sebastian)
- "Everybody Cha-Cha-Cha" (Sebastian)
- "You Wouldn't Want to Mess with Me" (Ursula)
- "You Wouldn't Want to Mess with Me" (Reprise) (Ursula)
- "The Sound of Laughter" (Sebastian)
- "The Sound of Laughter" (Repeat) (Sebastian)
- "Daring to Dance" (Ariel)
- "Daring to Dance" (Reprise) (Ariel)
- "Hail Apollo, Defender of the Sea" (Atlantica's Army)
- "I Just Like the Sky" (Scuttle)
- "Just Give Me a Chance" (Scuttle)
- "Just Give Me a Chance" (Reprise) (Scuttle)
- "I Go to the Beach" (Sebastian)
- "Just Like Me" (The Evil Manta)
- "Let's Play Princess (With Ariel)" (opening for Princess Collection - Ariel's Songs & Stories)

Music album release:

== Reception ==
=== Critical response ===
Caroline Siede of The A.V. Club praised the development of Ariel across the show, calling the character relatable and compelling, and said, "The Little Mermaid TV show finally gave Ariel the kind of adventure stories she deserves." Katerina Dailey of Screen Rant included The Little Mermaid in their "10 Best Disney TV Shows That Started As Movies" list, stating, "The film is a great watch even 30 years later. The same can be said, too, for the 1992 to 1994 animated series."

KJ Dell Antonia of Common Sense Media gave the series a grade of two out of five stars, writing, "Spin-off sinks for everyone except besotted fans."

Following the casting of Halle Bailey as Ariel in the 2023 live-action remake of the 1989 The Little Mermaid film, several journalists highlighted the character of Gabriella, a deaf mermaid of color appearing in the show. Sarah Kepins of MovieWeb asserted, "Gabriella was loved and accepted. There was no negative backlash over her addition to the animated show, and her inclusion meant something very important to many people."

=== Accolades ===
| Year | Award | Category | Nominee(s) | Result | Ref. |
|---|---|---|---|---|---|
| 1993 | Daytime Emmy Awards | Outstanding Film Sound Editing | Timothy J. Borquez, Brian F. Mars, John O. Robinson III, Michael Geisler, Michael Gollom, Sam Horta, Tom Jaeger, Rick Freeman | Nominated | |
| 1993 | Daytime Emmy Awards | Outstanding Film Sound Mixing | Timothy J. Borquez | Nominated | |
| 1993 | Annie Awards | Best Animated Television Program | The Little Mermaid | Nominated | |
| 1993 | Humanitas Prize | Children's Animation Category | The Little Mermaid (for "Eel-Ectric City") | Nominated | |
| 1993 | Humanitas Prize | Children's Animation Category | The Little Mermaid (for "Message In A Bottle") | Nominated | |
| 1994 | Daytime Emmy Awards | Outstanding Achievement in Film Sound Editing | Timothy J. Borquez, John O. Robinson III, Brian F. Mars, Dominick Certo, Patrick J. Foley, Kenneth Young, Timothy J. Garrity, Tom Jaeger, Greg LaPlante, Michael Geisler, Chris Rabideau | Nominated | |
| 1994 | Daytime Emmy Awards | Outstanding Achievement in Music Direction and Composition | Mark Watters | Nominated | |
| 1994 | Daytime Emmy Awards | Outstanding Film Sound Mixing | Scott Brownlee, Timothy J. Garrity, Timothy J. Borquez | Nominated | |
| 1995 | Daytime Emmy Awards | Outstanding Animated Children's Program | Patsy Cameron, Tedd Anasti, Jamie Mitchell | Nominated | |
| 1995 | Daytime Emmy Awards | Outstanding Film Sound Editing | John O. Robinson III, Brian F. Mars, Charles Rychwalski, Tom Jaeger, Jennifer Mertens, Michael Geisler, Greg LaPlante | Nominated | |
| 1995 | Daytime Emmy Awards | Outstanding Film Sound Mixing | Timothy J. Garrity, Timothy J. Borquez | Nominated | |

== Spin-off ==
The series received a spin-off entitled Sebastian the Crab, which aired as a segment of the TV series Marsupilami. The segments star Sebastian, and are set outside of the sea, taking place after the wedding between Ariel and Eric in the film.
