= The Further Adventures of Uncle Sam =

1970 animated short film

- Directed by: Dale Case and Robert Mitchell
- Production company: The Haboush Company
- Distributed by: Pyramid Films
- Release date: 1970
- Country: United States

The Further Adventures of Uncle Sam is a 1970 American animated short film by Dale Case and Robert Mitchell.

== Plot ==
Uncle Sam and his friend the American Eagle live peacefully in the Southwestern United States, running a gas station. But when Sam is kidnapped by men with money bags for heads, the Eagle goes off to rescue him. When Sam is rescued, he tells the Eagle that there is a plot to capture the Statue of Liberty by a bomb-headed businessman.

== Accolades ==
The Further Adventures of Uncle Sam was nominated for an Academy Award for Best Animated Short Film.

The film won the Grand Prix at the 1971 Annecy International Animation Festival, in a tie with Poland's The Appeal and Czechoslovakia's The Bride.

It was preserved by the Academy Film Archive in 2007.

== See also ==
- 1970 in film
- Independent animation
- Counterculture of the 1960s
