= Dev Ross =

American actress

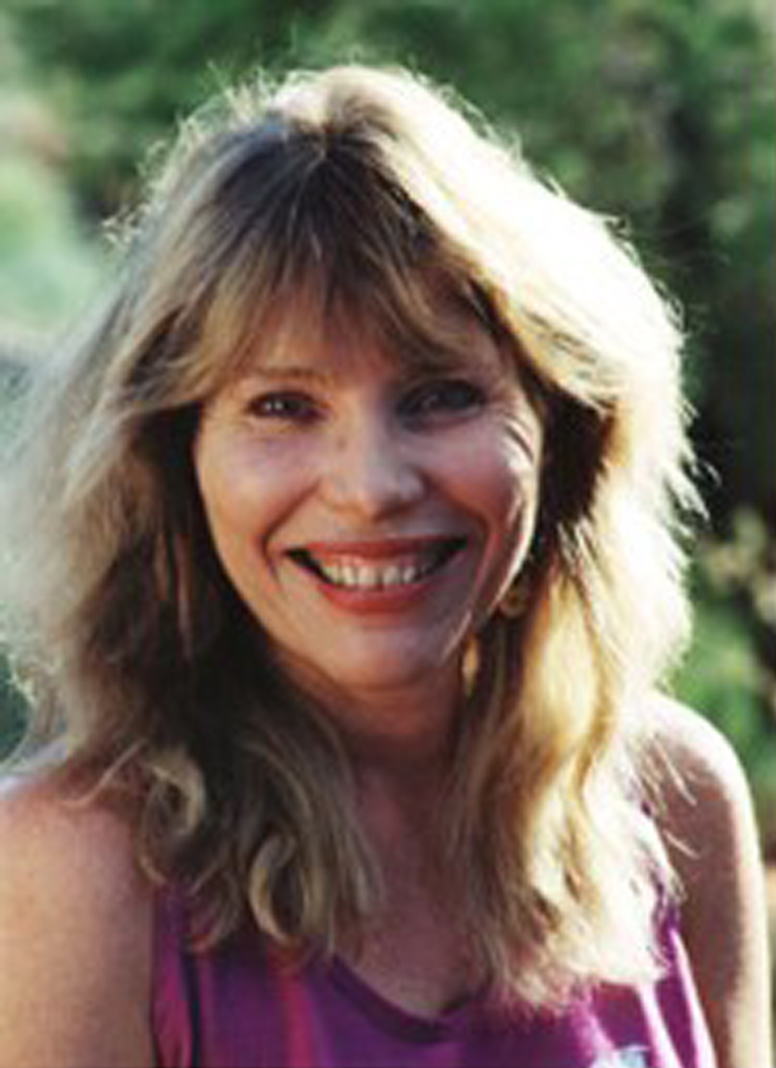
- Occupation: Screenwriter
- Years active: 1986–present

Dev Ross is an American screenwriter, children's book author, performer, director, and producer in theater, film, and television industries.

== Writing credits ==
Ross is a writer in print, animation, and theater, for several media content providers including Disney, ABC, Fox Kids, Universal Cartoon Studios, Cartoon Network, TLC, Discovery Channel, Nickelodeon, Mattel, the Web, and PBS. Ross worked as story analyst for film production companies and then became a staff writer at Disney Studios in 1991, where she also served as a voice director and "story doctor". During 2007, Ross worked for the Samsung Corporation in South Korea teaching university courses in digital screenwriting at both the graduate and undergraduate levels.

Ross wrote for several popular shows during the 1990s. These included Darkwing Duck, Jakers! The Adventures of Piggley Winks, Winnie the Pooh and Chip 'n Dale: Rescue Rangers, The Return of Jafar, Monster High, Animated Classic Showcase, Clifford the Big Red Dog, Clifford's Puppy Days, and the Adventures from the Book of Virtues. She helped bring movie characters to television with Aladdin and The Little Mermaid.

=== Children's books ===
Ross wrote a number of children's books for the popular "We Both Read" series.

- Ross, Dev (2009). Wild Animals of the United States. Treasure Bay. ISBN 978-1601152343.
- Ross, Dev (2008). Frank and the Balloon. Treasure Bay. ISBN 978-1601150127.
- Ross, Dev (November 2006). Fox's Best Trick Ever. Treasure Bay. ISBN 978-1891327704.

=== Television and animation awards ===
Award	Nomination/ Win	Award category	Show Title	Credit	Date	Channel/ Distributor
Action in Children's Television (ACT)	Win	Excellence in Television Writing	The Great American Hero Show	Writer	September 10, 1992	PBS
Annie	Win	Best Animated Home Video Release	The Return of Jafar	Writer	May 20, 1994	Walt Disney Home Video
Daytime Emmy	Nomination	Outstanding Writing in an Animated Program	Raw Toonage	Writer	May 22, 1993	CBS
Daytime Emmy	Win	Outstanding Animated Program	New Adventures of Winnie the Pooh	Writer	June 24, 1989	ABC
Humanitas	Win	Excellence in Screenwriting	Balto II: Wolf Quest	Writer	February 19, 2002	Universal Cartoon Studios

== Straight to video releases ==
- The Return of Jafar
- Balto II: Wolf Quest
- The Land Before Time II: The Great Valley Adventure
- The Land Before Time III: The Time of the Great Giving
- The Land Before Time IV: Journey Through the Mists
- The Land Before Time IX: Journey to Big Water

== Performing arts ==
Before turning to animation, Ross was the artistic director of the "Twelfth Night Repertory Company", a tri-city educational theatre and three time Emmy award-winning television troupe from 1980 to 1982 where she was a writer, director, and performer. Ross wrote and directed more than 70 plays for TNRC and Educational Theater Company, before leaving the schools. She even created a "synthesis of movement, text and sound", for which the schools became noted.

Prior to 2013, Ross's Theatrical awards include:

- Drama-Logue Award for Best New Musical Play, Westwood Playhouse - "Once Upon a Genesis"

As of 2013, Ross is the creator and head writer of her own original web show called "The Rocks."
