= Rock Art Show =

The Rock Art Show is a traveling art show, now based in Philadelphia, presented by local radio stations, with art of and by rock musicians. The show features over 150 framed drawings, paintings, lyrics, photographs, animation cels, gold records, concert posters, album art and other art forms. It is curated by Scott Segelbaum.

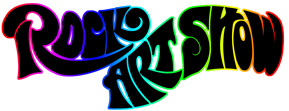
Rock Art Show Logo

== Formation/Early Days (1992–1996) ==
The idea for the first Rock Art Show was the brainchild of Scott Segelbaum during his time working at KLSX, a radio station based in Los Angeles, California. The promotion was an annual one-week event, usually held at the Directors Guild Building on Sunset Boulevard. During its five-year run, the art show was visited by many high-profile guests, including Elton John, Brian Wilson, Stevie Nicks, Mick Fleetwood, Brian Setzer, Graham Nash, Joe Walsh, Peter Frampton, Jon Anderson, and Robbie Krieger. 100% of the art sales went to several AIDS related charities; raising over one million dollars during the show's time in Los Angeles. In 1994, the Rock Art Show was awarded the prestigious 'Best of the Best' Public Service Promotions honor in the 1994 National Association of Broadcasters (NAB) Convention. Around the same time, Segelbaum was hired as a consultant for the book Musicians as Artists (Journey 1994) a book that showcased works of art by famous musicians.

== Greater Media Philadelphia Era (1999–2004) ==
In 1999, Scott relocated to Philadelphia after being offered a job as marketing director for the classic rock oriented station WMGK, and rock station WMMR. Thus, bringing the Rock Art Show with him. Like the previous shows in Los Angeles, the Rock Art Show in Philadelphia proved to be a tremendous success. The show was able to generate press coverage, as well as raising money for charitable organizations. In 2001, the auction raised more than $60,000. The Rock Art Show was also awarded the Achievement in Radio (AIR) award in 2001, for “Best Radio Sponsored Community Event of the Year”.

== Rock Art Show Tour (2004–2022) ==
In 2004, Scott decided to pursue forming his own business, making the Rock Art Show a national event. That same year, he co-founded Right Brain Revenue, Inc. with business partner Sam Milkman. Currently, Right Brain Revenue, Inc. holds an average of 30-40 of these events a year around the country with various radio stations. Featured in the show are photographs from renowned rock photographer, Baron Wolman, the first chief photographer for Rolling Stone Magazine, as well as famous poster designer, Bob Masse, who has created famous concert posters for various bands from the 60's to the present. The Rock Art Show also features original pop art paintings by Beatle's animator Ron Campbell. Other artwork displayed are original hand drawn artwork and lyrics, gold records, concert posters, and paintings. The prices of the art carried by the show range from five dollars, to five thousand dollars. 10% of each show's profit goes to a different charity. Dylan Segelbaum and Jake Segelbaum, sons of Scott, occasionally assist Scott with local shows.

== May Pang Art Exhibit (2023-Present) ==
In early 2023, Scott partnered with May Pang, a former music producer and past romantic partner of John Lennon. During Pang's 18-month relationship with Lennon, she took many candid photographs of Lennon and other legendary musicians. Scott and Pang currently tour the United States exhibiting Pang's artwork.
