= Ron Campbell (animator) =

Australian animator (1939–2021)

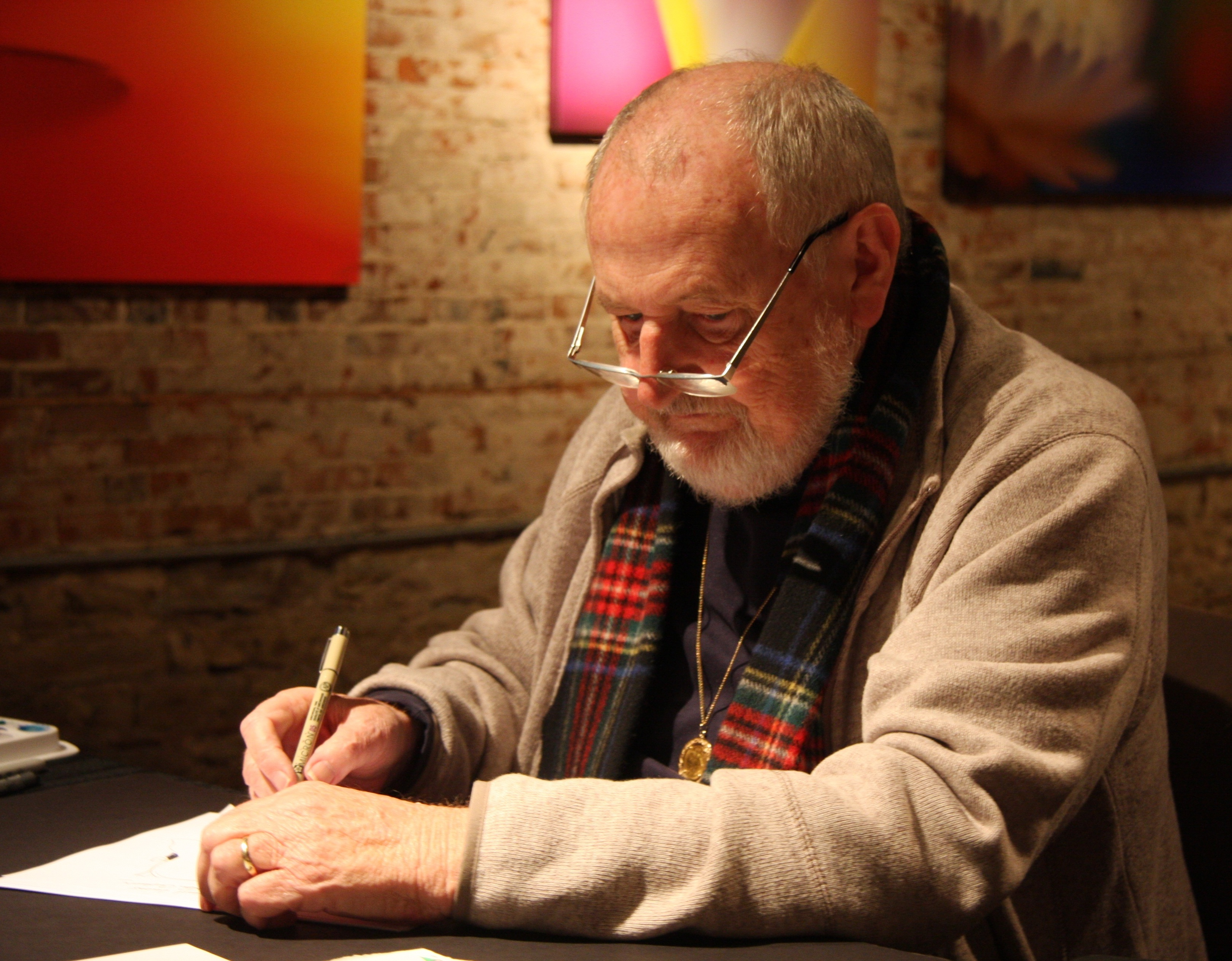
- Campbell in 2015
- Born: 26 December 1939; Seymour, Victoria, Australia
- Died: 22 January 2021 (aged 81); Phoenix, Arizona, U.S.
- Occupation: Animator
- Years active: 1958–2008
- Spouse: Engelina
- Children: 2

Ron Campbell (26 December 1939 – 22 January 2021) was an Australian animator, director, and producer, best known for his work on the 1960s The Beatles television series, as well as the animated feature film Yellow Submarine.

== Early career ==
Ron Campbell's career began in 1958 animating various commercials for Australian television. However, when Al Brodax brought both his Krazy Kat and Beetle Bailey cartoons to Australia for production, Campbell was recruited to work on the project.

After Krazy Kat, Campbell went on to direct many installments of The Beatles television series for King Features. The show debuted on 25 September 1965, and remained number one in the ratings for the duration of its four-year run. He later wrote the foreword to the book Beatletoons: The Real Story Behind The Cartoon Beatles, where his involvement in the show is also talked about extensively.

Ron's surname is misspelled as "CAMBELL" at the end credits of "Cool McCool".

Due in part to the enormous success of the program, Campbell was hired by Bill Hanna (of Hanna-Barbera fame) and relocated to Hollywood, California. In Hollywood, he would go on to work on a wide array of animated television series including, but not limited to: The Smurfs, The Jetsons, The Flintstones, Scooby-Doo, Rugrats, Rocket Power, and Ed, Edd n Eddy.

== Yellow Submarine ==
In 1968, Al Brodax once again contracted Campbell from London, where he was producing The Beatles' feature-length animated motion picture, Yellow Submarine. Brodax asked Campbell, and his colleague Duane Crowther, if they could animate many of the connecting sequences in the movie. Together, they subsequently ended up animating around twelve minutes, or roughly one seventh of the entire film. In his 2004 memoir Up Periscope Yellow, chronicling the making of Yellow Submarine, Brodax accredits Campbell for essentially helping pull together various elements of the movie. As one of the film's animators, Ron Campbell contributed to the book, Inside the Yellow Submarine- The Making of the Beatles Animated Classic by Robert Hieronimus, a unique historical perspective on the making of the film.

== Ron Campbell Films ==
In 1971, Campbell founded his own animation studio, Ron Campbell Films, Inc.; the company's first project would also place him as associate producer for ABC's television special Nanny and the Professor.

He would also go on to produce and direct animation in both the Emmy and Peabody award-winning children's shows, The Big Blue Marble and Sesame Street. Following this, Campbell worked on the hit animated series, The Smurfs.

== Disney, Nickelodeon, and retirement ==
The 1990s took Campbell to Disney Animation, where he worked on several cartoons, including: Bonkers, Goof Troop, The New Adventures of Winnie the Pooh and Darkwing Duck. In addition to this, he also worked with Klasky-Csupo for Nickelodeon, and storyboarded on such shows as: Rugrats, Rocket Power, and Duckman for the USA Network.

In retirement, Campbell lived in the Phoenix, Arizona area and created original pop art paintings, based upon the films he was involved with in one capacity or another. His paintings were sold through Scott Segelbaum's Rock Art Show, with whom he regularly exhibited and sold his artwork in various art galleries throughout North America.

== Death ==
Campbell died in Phoenix, Arizona, on 22 January 2021, aged 81.
