= Balto II: Wolf Quest =

2002 film by Phil Weinstein

- DVD release cover
- Directed by: Phil Weinstein
- Screenplay by: Dev Ross
- Produced by: Phil Weinstein
- Starring: Jodi Benson; David Carradine; Lacey Chabert; Mark Hamill; Maurice LaMarche; Peter MacNicol; Charles Fleischer; Rob Paulsen; Nicolette Little; Melanie Spore; Kevin Schon
- Edited by: Jay Bixsen; Ken Solomon
- Music by: Adam Berry (score); Amanda McBroom; Michele Brourman (songs)
- Production companies: Universal Cartoon Studios; Overseas Animation: Wang Film Productions
- Distributed by: Universal Studios Home Video
- Release date: February 19, 2002
- Running time: 75 minutes
- Country: United States
- Language: English

Balto II: Wolf Quest is a 2002 American direct-to-video animated adventure film produced and directed by Phil Weinstein. It is the sequel to Universal Pictures/Amblin Entertainment's 1995 Northern animated film Balto. Balto II: Wolf Quest was released by Universal Studios Home Video on February 19, 2002.

== Plot ==
A few months after his heroic journey, Balto mated with Jenna, and they now have a new family of six puppies in Alaska. Five of their puppies resemble their husky mother, while one pup, named Aleu, inherits her wolfdog father's features. When the puppies reach eight weeks old, all but Aleu are adopted into new homes. Her wild animal appearance deters potential adopters, leaving her to live with her father.

A year later when she is grown, Aleu is almost killed by a hunter who mistakes her for a wild wolf. Balto tells Aleu the truth about her wolf heritage, causing her to run away, hoping to find her place in the world. Balto then goes out into the Alaskan wilderness to find her. At the same time, Balto has been struggling with strange dreams of a raven and a pack of wolves, and he cannot understand their meaning. Balto resolves to find the meaning of these dreams as he searches for Aleu. His friends Boris, Muk, and Luk attempt to join him, but after they are halted by some unknown force, they realize that this journey is meant only for the father and daughter themselves, making them unable to join the journey to ensure Balto is completely alone.

Taking refuge in a cave, Aleu meets the field mouse Muru, who explains that Aleu should not be ashamed of her lineage, which tells her what she is but not who she is. Muru reveals himself to be Aleu's spirit guide and tells her to go on a journey of self-discovery. Balto and Aleu reunite when he saves her from the grizzly bear and reconcile, and find their way to the ocean, where they are attacked by a group of starving Northwestern wolves led by Niju, an arrogant and vicious wolf.

The confrontation is defused by the elderly Nava, the true leader of the pack, who welcomes Balto and Aleu. Nava announces to his pack that the wolf spirit Aniu has contacted him in "dream visions". Aniu has told him that the caribou herd they depend on during the winter has moved across the ocean and will not return and that they will soon be led by a new leader, "the one who is a wolf but does not know". Nava believes that Balto, who is half wolf himself, is the chosen one that Aniu was speaking of. However, Niju refuses to abandon his homeland and takes control of the pack, and plots to steal from other animal clans in the area to survive the winter.

Aleu has a "dream vision" of the caribou herd crossing a bridge made of ice floes. The next morning, Niju prepares to lead an attack on a clan of bears, but is stopped by Balto just as a large group of ice floes in the ocean come together to form a land bridge. Balto then leads the pack across the bridge until Nava falls behind. When Aleu attempts to help Nava, Niju attacks, and Balto doubles back to save them, leaving the pack leaderless. Nava cannot make the journey across the ice in his old age, and Balto tells Niju to go lead the clan.

Niju refuses, too afraid to leave his home, and soon returns to the shore. Balto prepares to go to the pack, but Aleu realizes that her true place is to take leadership of the pack as Nava foretold. Balto and Aleu say goodbye to each other before Aleu rejoins the pack and takes over as the leader. Back on shore, Nava bids farewell to Balto before going to look for Niju so they can survive together. The raven appears to Balto again, and transforms into Aniu, revealing herself to be his mother before he begins to make his way home.

== Voice cast ==
- Lacey Chabert as Aleu
- Maurice LaMarche as Balto. He was voiced by Kevin Bacon in the original film.
- Mark Hamill as Niju
- David Carradine as Nava
- Peter MacNicol as Muru
- Jodi Benson as Jenna. She was voiced by Bridget Fonda in the original film.
- Charles Fleischer as Boris. He was voiced by Bob Hoskins in the original film.
- Kevin Schon as Muk, Luk, Wolverine #1. Muk and Luk were voiced by Phil Collins in the original film.
- Rob Paulsen as Terrier, Sumac, Wolverine #2, singing voice of Muru
- Nicolette Little as Dingo
- Melanie Spore as Saba
- Joe Alaskey as Hunter, Nuk
- Monnae Michaell as Aniu
- Mary Kay Bergman as Fox, Wolverine #3
- Jeff Bennett as Yak

Balto II: Wolf Quest is the last film Bergman contributed to before she committed suicide on November 11, 1999, releasing it posthumously.

== Production ==
Following the original film's strong video sales, development on Balto II: Wolf Quest, as well as Balto III: Wings of Change, began at Universal Pictures's animation division, Universal Cartoon Studios, after subsequently discontinuing An American Tail film series in 1999. Television animation director and storyboard artist Phil Weinstein, who had recently finished directing on Hercules at Disney Television Animation, was interviewed to direct the sequel, and accepted the job. By the time Weinstein had joined the project, screenwriter Dev Ross had written a screenplay.

Due to a significantly lower budget and faster turnaround time than those of the original film, all of the animation in Wolf Quest was outsourced to the Taiwanese-American animation studio Wang Film Productions, and completed in approximately 36 weeks. The tighter budget, as well as scheduling conflicts, prevented Kevin Bacon, Bob Hoskins, Bridget Fonda and Phil Collins from reprising their respective roles as Balto, Boris, Jenna, Muk and Luk from the original film. They were replaced by Maurice LaMarche, Charles Fleischer, Jodi Benson and Kevin Schon, respectively. Having seen Star Wars (1977) in theaters as a child, Weinstein found it surreal to be working with Mark Hamill, who voiced Niju.

While songwriting duo Michele Brourman and Amanda McBroom wrote the songs for Wolf Quest, the film score was composed by Adam Berry. Berry and Weinstein watched animatic scenes that were mocked up with temp score together, to agree on musical ideas. Though Weinstein already had clear ideas for the score, he stated that Berry "took it way beyond what I ever could have imagined." Berry recorded his score at the chapel of Bastyr University in Seattle, Washington. Weinstein enjoyed being able to sit in the room with the orchestra, as opposed to sitting in an isolated room.

== Music ==
The songs are written by Michele Brourman and Amanda McBroom. A chorus performs several of the songs, and includes Amanda McBroom, George Ball, Roger Freeland, Ali Olmo, Lisa Harlow Stark and Rob Trow.

Original songs performed in the film include:

No.	Title	Performer(s)	Length
1.	"Taking You Home"	Kimaya Seward	1:28
2.	"Muru's Chant"	Rob Paulsen	1:12
3.	"Who You Really Are"	Rob Paulsen & Chorus	2:02
4.	"The Grand Design"	David Carradine, Mark Hamill & Chorus	3:13

== Reception ==
=== Awards ===
Balto II: Wolf Quest was nominated for an Annie Award in 2003 for "Outstanding Storyboarding in an Animated Television Production".

Writer Dev Ross was awarded the Humanitas Prize in 2002 for her script in the Children's Animation category.

=== Simon Wells' reaction ===
In a 2015 interview, Simon Wells, the director of the original film, stated that he has not seen Wolf Quest, nor has he seen Balto III: Wings of Change, because "the original movie was close to my heart, and I didn't want to see what other people had done afterwards." However, Wells recounted that his daughters watched Wolf Quest repeatedly as children, and enjoyed it greatly.
