= Floro Dery =

Filipino illustrator

Floro Dery (born 18 June 1958) is a Filipino illustrator best known for his work as design supervisor of the 1980s The Transformers TV series and was the visual creator of The Transformers: The Movie. He modified the 1984 character models originally designed by Shōhei Kohara and created the 1985 models, all of which became the visual guidelines both for the comic book and the animated cartoon appearances of those characters. He was also charged with designing all the characters introduced in the movie.

Dery is also known for illustrating the Sunday edition of the syndicated The Amazing Spider-Man comic strip from 1982 to 1992. Design supervisor for the 1986 animated series Wildfire, he was responsible for character design. Dery worked alongside fellow Filipino Alex Niño as a storyboard artist for Sunbow Productions on Visionaries: Knights of the Magical Light. He was the character designer for the 1987 animated film Ultraman: The Adventure Begins. He went on to be the production designer for Pirates of Dark Water and a storyboard artist for Spider-Man: The Animated Series.

Dery was involved in the artists' protest movement against the dictator Ferdinand Marcos in the 1970s, the Nagkakaisang Progresibong Artista at Arkitekto (United Progressive Artists and Architects).
