= Dale Case =

American animator and film director

Dale Case (born May 15, 1938) is an American retired animator and film director.

== Life and career ==
Case was born in Los Angeles, California in 1938. His father, Brad, was an animator who worked at Disney, MGM, Hanna-Barbera, and Warner Bros. Case graduated from the Chouinard Art Institute, and his earliest credits came in the 1960s from King Leonardo and His Short Subjects and The Beatles TV series. He was one of the animators for the title sequence of 1963's The Pink Panther, and later worked on a number of Pink Panther shorts at DePatie–Freleng Enterprises. He was an animator on the 1975 The 2000 Year Old Man half-hour special by Mel Brooks and Carl Reiner.

In the 1980s and 1990s, Case worked overseas at Walt Disney Television Animation Australia, supervising animation on shows such as Chip 'n Dale: Rescue Rangers and the Emmy Award-winning The New Adventures of Winnie the Pooh, and films such as DuckTales the Movie: Treasure of the Lost Lamp and the Aladdin sequels The Return of Jafar and Aladdin and the King of Thieves. In 1998, Case directed the "Fifi's Folly" segment of Belle's Magical World. In his later career, Case worked as an animator for Nickelodeon on Hey Arnold! and for Cartoon Network on Ed, Edd n Eddy.

== Accolades ==
In 1970, he received an Academy Award for Best Animated Short Film nomination for co-directing The Further Adventures of Uncle Sam, an independent short film he made with Robert Mitchell. The film also won the Grand Prix at the 1971 Annecy International Animation Festival, and was a nominee for a Gold Hugo at the Chicago International Film Festival. In the 1990s, Case was nominated for two Daytime Emmy Awards for his work on Darkwing Duck and Aladdin.
