= Darkwing Duck =

American animated television series (1991–1992)

- Logo for the show
- Genre: Superhero fiction; Crime comedy; Mystery; Slapstick comedy
- Created by: Tad Stones
- Directed by: Tad Stones; Alan Zaslove
- Voices of: Jim Cummings; Terry McGovern; Christine Cavanaugh
- Theme music composer: Steve Nelson; Thom Sharp
- Opening theme: "Darkwing Duck Theme" by Jeff Pescetto; Steve Tyrell; Kasey Cisyk
- Ending theme: "Darkwing Duck Theme" (Instrumental) by Philip Giffin
- Composer: Philip Giffin
- Country of origin: United States
- Original language: English
- No. of seasons: 3
- No. of episodes: 91 (list of episodes)

Production
- Running time: 22 minutes
- Production companies: Walt Disney Television Animation (Note: Animation outsourced to Atelier BWCA, Hanho Heung-Up, Jade Animation, Kennedy Cartoons, Studio Jack, Sunwoo Animation, Tama Productions, Walt Disney Animation Australia, Walt Disney Animation France, Walt Disney Animation Japan and Wang Film Productions); Walt Disney Television

Original release
- Network: Syndication (The Disney Afternoon)
- Release: September 6, 1991 – May 20, 1992
- Network: ABC
- Release: September 14, 1991 – December 12, 1992

Darkwing Duck is an American animated superhero comedy television series produced by Walt Disney Television Animation that first ran from 1991 to 1992 on both the syndicated programming block The Disney Afternoon and Saturday mornings on ABC. A total of ninety-one episodes were aired. It features the adventures of Darkwing Duck, who is the superheroic alter-ego of ordinary suburban duck Drake Mallard.

As of 2026, a reboot of the series has been ordered for Disney+, with older characters. Mark Hamill will take over the role of Darkwing Duck.

== Premise ==
Darkwing Duck follows the adventures of the titular superhero, aided by his sidekick and pilot Launchpad McQuack. (Note: A character originating from DuckTales.) In his secret identity of Drake Mallard, (Note: A parody of Kent Allard, the alter ego of The Shadow.) he lives in an unassuming suburban house with his adopted daughter Gosalyn, next door to the dim-witted Muddlefoot family. Darkwing struggles to balance his egotistical craving for fame and attention against his desire to be a good father to Gosalyn and help do good in St. Canard as he fights villains that include but are not limited to Negaduck, (Note: An evil counterpart of Darkwing Duck heralding from an alternate reality.) Dr. Reginald Bushroot, Megavolt, Quackerjack, Liquidator, F.O.W.L. agents like Steelbeak and Ammonia Pine, and Arturo Tuskernini. Most episodes place these two sides of Darkwing's character in direct conflict, though his better nature usually wins out.

The show was the first Disney animated TV series overall to emphasize action rather than adventure, with Darkwing routinely engaging in slapstick battles with both supervillains and street criminals. While conflict with villains was routine in earlier Disney Afternoon shows, actual fight scenes were relatively rare.

Darkwing Duck was also the first Disney Afternoon property that was produced completely as a genre parody. Prior shows would contain elements of parody in certain episodes, but would otherwise be straight-faced adventure concepts, this in the tradition of Carl Barks' work in the Disney comics. By contrast, every episode of Darkwing Duck is laden with references to superhero, pulp adventure, or super-spy fiction. Darkwing himself is a satirical character. His costume, consisting of a purple domino mask and tuxedo over a teal sweater, grey hat and dark purple cape, gas gun and flashy introductions are all reminiscent of pulp magazine heroes and Golden Age superheroes such as The Shadow, The Sandman, Doc Savage, Batman, The Green Hornet and the Julius Schwartz Flash, as well as the Lone Ranger and Zorro. The fictional city of St. Canard is a direct parody of Gotham City. (Note: "Canard" is the French word for "duck".)

== Episodes ==
Season	Episodes	Originally released		
Season	Episodes	First released	Last released	Network
1 — syndicated	65	September 6, 1991	May 20, 1992	syndicated (The Disney Afternoon)
1 — ABC	13	September 7, 1991	November 30, 1991	ABC
2	13	September 12, 1992	December 12, 1992	ABC

== Production ==
Darkwing Duck was developed as a last-minute replacement with concept artwork by Michael Peraza for a proposed reboot of The Rocky and Bullwinkle Show, when the management team realized that Disney did not own the rights to the characters. (Note: Disney merely held home video rights to the series.)

The series that would become Darkwing Duck entered development roughly one year after DuckTales ended. The concept was inspired by two specific episodes: "Double-O-Duck" starring Launchpad McQuack as a secret agent, and "The Masked Mallard" in which Scrooge McDuck becomes a masked vigilante superhero wearing a purple uniform and cape. The "Masked Mallard" became an epithet often used in the new show to refer to Darkwing himself.

Tad Stones was directed to come up with a series based around the premise of the "Double-O Duck" character, as an executive liked the title Double-O Duck as a spoof of James Bond and felt Launchpad McQuack would take the starring role. It turned out that the Double-O Duck title could not be used as the Broccoli family owned the "Double-O" name.

A new name was selected, "Darkwing Duck". Thus, Stones designed a new character for the lead, Drake Mallard, while selecting McQuack as the sidekick. This name would result in a new look, complete with a purple tuxedo and domino mask, grey hat and dark purple cape. (Note: In his original design, "Double-O Duck" was to wear a white tuxedo with a red bow tie, red domino mask, and a blue hat and cape.) Other elements of the show, such as Darkwing's habit of coining new catchphrases every time he announced himself, would be invented during production. (Note: As an in-joke, the episode "A Duck by Any Other Name" had Drake suggest "Double-O Duck" as his new secret identity, and Launchpad remarked that it "seems kinda silly".)

Where most prior Disney Afternoon series included at least some preexisting animated characters, Darkwing Duck featured a completely original cast. Even with the DuckTales characters, it had reused no counterpart in early Disney shorts or the comics. The only exception was the episode "In Like Blunt", which featured cameo appearances by the Beagle Boys, Flintheart Glomgold and Magica De Spell.

Though it was originally thought by some fans to be a spin-off of the 1987 DuckTales series, creator Tad Stones stated in a 2016 report that the two shows exist in different universes. Despite this, supporting characters Launchpad McQuack and Gizmoduck appear in both series in similar roles, and Scrooge McDuck is mentioned in the episode "Tiff of the Titans", and thus established a relation to both of those series.

== Broadcast history ==
Darkwing Duck first aired on The Disney Channel on March 31, 1991, as a "sneak preview", and then from April 6 into July 14 of that year as a regularly scheduled run on weekend mornings, as it was advertised to be "The newest animated TV series exclusively to The Disney Channel". In reality, this was a preview-run of the series before it aired on The Disney Afternoon.

The two-part episode "Darkly Dawns the Duck" originally aired as an hour-length TV special on September 6, 1991, as part of a larger syndicated TV special, The Darkwing Duck Premiere / Back to School with the Mickey Mouse Club. The film served as the show's pilot. Seasons 1 and 2 were aired simultaneously in the autumn of 1991. Season 1 aired in syndication as part of The Disney Afternoon block of shows. Seasons 2 and 3 aired on Saturday mornings on ABC. The final episode aired on December 12, 1992. ABC stopped airing reruns of the show in September 1993, and it was replaced by Sonic the Hedgehog. All episodes remained in syndicated reruns on The Disney Afternoon until 1995 and then returned to the lineup from 1996 to 1997.

Starting on October 2, 1995, Darkwing Duck was rerun on The Disney Channel as part of a two-hour programming block called "Block Party" which aired on weekdays in the late-afternoon/early-evening and which also included TaleSpin, DuckTales, and Chip 'n Dale Rescue Rangers. On September 3, 1996, Darkwing Duck was dropped from the beginning of the block when Goof Troop was added to the end.

The series was last seen in the U.S. on Toon Disney on January 19, 2007, as part of the Toon Disney Wild Card Stack. Certain episodes from the show's original run rarely re-aired while the show was on Toon Disney. These episodes appear to have been removed for content reasons. The most prominent of the rarely seen episodes is "Hot Spells", which was never re-aired after its initial broadcast on ABC because of its religiously sensitive subject matter. Darkwing Duck was one of the first American animated TV series to be officially broadcast in syndication in the former Soviet Union. The show formerly aired on Disney XD in international territories such as the Netherlands and Germany.

== Home media ==
Four VHS cassettes, each containing one or two episodes (a total of 6 episodes) of Darkwing Duck, were released under the title Darkwing Duck: His Favorite Adventures in the United States on March 23, 1993, individually titled "Darkly Dawns the Duck", "Justice Ducks Unite!", "Comic Book Capers" and "Birth of Negaduck!". However, most countries around the world only received releases of "Darkly Dawns the Duck" and "Justice Ducks Unite!" Each video came with two "glow-in-the-Darkwing" trading cards. Featured on the cards were Darkwing Duck, Launchpad, Gosalyn, Honker, Negaduck, Bushroot, Megavolt, and Taurus Bulba. The videotapes also included a Darkwing Duck music video which played at the end of each tape.

Additionally, on September 28, 1993, the Darkwing Duck episode "It's a Wonderful Leaf" was released together with the Goof Troop episode "Have Yourself a Goofy Little Christmas" on one VHS cassette as a special release called Happy Holidays with Darkwing Duck and Goofy! On September 3, 1996, the Darkwing Duck episode "Ghoul of My Dreams" was released together with the Chip 'n Dale Rescue Rangers episode "Good Times, Bat Times" on one VHS cassette as a special release called Witcheroo!

Walt Disney Studios Home Entertainment released a three-disc DVD box set entitled "Darkwing Duck - Volume 1" on August 29, 2006. It included 25 episodes, plus the two-part pilot "Darkly Dawns the Duck", as opposed to the uncut version's release on VHS. The second volume, containing the next 27 episodes, was released on August 7, 2007. The sets do not contain any special features. It is currently unknown if Disney has any intentions of releasing the remaining 37 episodes on DVD. No official releases have been made outside of the United States and Canada.

As of September 2019, the majority of the series is available for purchase on the iTunes Store and Google TV, with the lone exception of the banned episode "Hot Spells". They are listed in 6 separate volumes (with Seasons 2 and 3 individually representing the last two volumes), which on the iTunes Store can also be bought in a pack other than individual purchases or a complete series pack at the price of $40 for all 90 available episodes. In addition, the series (with the exception of the episode "Hot Spells") can also be viewed on the Disney+ streaming service, since its launch on November 12, 2019.

== Reception ==
=== Critical reception ===
On the review aggregator website Rotten Tomatoes, the first season holds an approval of 83% based on 6 reviews, with an average rating of 7.00/10.

Nigel Mitchell of CBR.com stated, "He was the terror that flapped in the night. He was the fingernail that scraped the blackboard of your soul. He was Darkwing Duck, and he made a generation laugh and thrill with his crazy adventures. Following the success of DuckTales, the 1992 TV show Darkwing Duck was one of the first action-oriented shows on Disney's block, and wasn't like any other show on TV." Amanda Dyer of Common Sense Media rated the series 4 out of 5 stars, writing, "Darkwing Duck is a 1990s Disney animated comedy that has slapstick cartoon violence (including weapon use) and mild name calling. It follows the heroic yet self-serving antics of cartoon duck superhero Darkwing Duck as he battles various wacky supervillains with his sidekick, Launchpad McQuack."

Darkwing Duck was named the 93rd Best Animated Series by IGN, calling it "one of the many reasons why after-school cartoons rule". "Torgo's Pizzeria Podcast" gave a favorable retrospective review to Darkwing Duck in April 2012; the podcast did however note some weaknesses with the series. Nick Caruso of TVLine lists the theme song from the series, performed by longtime Disney Afternoon veteran Jeff Pescetto, among the best animated series themes of all time.

=== Accolades ===
Year	Award	Category	Nominee(s)	Result	Ref.
1992	Annie Awards	Best Animated Television Program	Disney Television Animation	Nominated	
1992	Annie Awards	Voice Acting in the Field of Animation	Jim Cummings: For the voice of Darkwing Duck	Won	
1992	Daytime Emmy Awards	Outstanding Animated Program	Tad Stones; Alan Zaslove; Bob Hathcock; Ken Kessel; Russ Mooney; Toby Shelton; Hank Tucker; James T. Walker; Carole Beers; Marsh Lamore; Rick Leon; John Kimball	Nominated	
1992	Daytime Emmy Awards	Outstanding Writing in an Animated Program	Steve Roberts; Duane Capizzi: For the episode of "Negaduck"	Nominated	
1992	Daytime Emmy Awards	Outstanding Writing in an Animated Program	Carter Crocker; Tad Stones: For the episode of "Dead Duck"	Nominated	
1992	Daytime Emmy Awards	Outstanding Film Sound Mixing	Allen L. Stone; Robert L. Harman; James L. Aicholtz	Nominated	
1992	Daytime Emmy Awards	Outstanding Film Sound Editing	Rick Hinson; Rich Harrison; David Lynch; Cecil Broughton; Jennifer Harrison; Charlie King; Andrew Rose; Jerry Winicki	Nominated	
1993	Daytime Emmy Awards	Outstanding Animated Children's Program	Tad Stones; Alan Zaslove; Toby Shelton; Dale Case; John Kimball; Rick Leon	Nominated	
1993	Daytime Emmy Awards	Outstanding Film Sound Editing	Jerry Winicki; Cecil Broughton; Rick Hinson; Charlie King; Rich Harrison; Jennifer Harrison; Andrew Rose; David Lynch	Nominated	
1993	Daytime Emmy Awards	Outstanding Film Sound Mixing	Robert L. Harman; Patrick Cyccone Jr. William Freesh	Nominated	

== In other media ==
=== Video games ===
- Darkwing Duck video game was released by Capcom on the Nintendo Entertainment System and the Game Boy as a platform side-scroller. The game was developed for the NES in 1992 and was ported to the Game Boy in 1993. The Game Boy version is essentially a slightly stripped-down version of the game.
- Darkwing Duck (a different game with the same title) was also released for the TurboGrafx-16 in 1992 as an action side-scroller.
- A Disney's Darkwing Duck hand-held LCD game from Tiger Electronics was also released in 1992.
- Darkwing Duck (yet another game with the same title) was released for various touchscreen mobile phones as a platform side-scroller in 2010.
- Disney Infinity: Marvel Super Heroes (2.0 Edition) has two power discs that were released for the game, "Darkwing Duck's Grappling Gun" and "Darkwing Duck's Ratcatcher". Darkwing Duck himself is a townsperson in the 2.0 Toy Box. Darkwing Duck was close to being a playable character in 2.0 but was eventually scrapped.
- Disney Infinity 3.0 had Darkwing Duck close to being a playable character but lost to Olaf in the fan polls for the initial wave of Disney characters for 3.0. However, Darkwing was one of the characters listed on the official fan poll for Disney Infinity that was conducted during the 3.0 life cycle to determine new characters for future installments. Despite being one of the most desired characters, the character will not make it in the game due to the game's cancellation.
- Darkwing Duck was added to Disney Emoji Blitz in 2017 with Scrooge and Launchpad.
- Darkwing Duck was added to Disney Heroes: Battle Mode in January 2019 as a 2-star hero and the first character from Disney Television Animation. Megavolt was added to the game in November 2019 as a 2-star hero. Quackerjack was added to the game in June 2021 as a 1-star hero. Negaduck was added to the game in June 2023 as a 1-star hero.
- Darkwing Duck has been a playable character in Disney Sorcerer's Arena since the game's soft launch.

=== Comic books ===
Disney Comics published a four-issue Darkwing Duck comic book mini-series in late 1991, right around the time of the show's syndicated premiere. This mini-series was an adaptation of a draft of the script for "Darkly Dawns the Duck". Like the TaleSpin comic before it, it was meant to spin off a regular comic series, but the Disney Comics implosion happening at the time prevented that plan. However, Darkwing Duck stories were regularly printed in Disney Adventures magazine between the November 1991 and January 1996 issues. Additionally, Darkwing Duck stories were also regularly featured in Marvel Comics' short-lived Disney Afternoon comic book.

==== BOOM! Studios ====
On March 13, 2010, BOOM! Studios announced that they would be releasing a four-issue Darkwing Duck miniseries, titled "The Duck Knight Returns", starting in June of that year. The series was written by Aaron Sparrow (uncredited), Ian Brill and drawn by James Silvani, and was set one year after the end of the show. BOOM! later announced that due to positive fan reaction, the comic series would be extended indefinitely as an ongoing title. This first trade paperback collection of the initial four issues of the comic was released in the fall of 2010

Unlike the original show, the comic strengthened Darkwing Duck's ties to the parent show DuckTales and began to use a number of Carl Barks characters like Magica De Spell (allied to Negaduck in the second story) and cameoing Scrooge McDuck and Gyro Gearloose. A 4-part crossover story with Disney's DuckTales, titled "Dangerous Currency", was released with parts 1 and 3 for DuckTales #5 and #6, and parts 2 and 4 for Darkwing Duck #17 and #18. The comic also made a lot of homages to other Disney shows: Magica's powered up form in #7 has emblems that reference film villains like Hades and Jafar, someone holds a sign saying "Bring Back Bonkers" in the background of #6, and #3 shows Launchpad tried to get a job with Gadget Hackwrench of the Rescue Rangers from Chip 'n Dale Rescue Rangers.

The eighteenth issue, which shipped in October 2011, was the end of the series due to BOOM! Studios prematurely losing the Disney Comics license. Darkwing Duck Vol. 5 "Dangerous Currency" crossover, released in November 2011, was the final printing.

==== Joe Books ====
On January 20, 2016, it was reported that the series would be returning to the comic book format. Writers Aaron Sparrow and artist James Silvani, both of whom worked on the previous Darkwing Duck comic book that was published by Boom! returned to this comic. Additionally Andrew Dalhouse, Deron Bennett and Jesse Post assumed their roles on the creative team, with R. Janice Orlando, who worked on The Definitively Dangerous Edition, returning as Assistant Editor. Darkwing Duck is now wearing a purple necktie instead of his usual turtleneck.

The first issue debuted on April 27, 2016. Titled "Orange is the New Purple". The comic was cancelled after eight issues due to poor sales.

==== IDW Publishing ====
On July 25, 2018, it was announced that the Boom! Studios would be reprinted in Disney's Afternoon Giant. The first issue will be released in October 2018.

==== Comic creatorship ====
Throughout the run of BOOM! Studios' Darkwing Duck comic series, there was controversy as to who was responsible for the series. Editor Aaron Sparrow is largely credited with the idea to relaunch the property and has claimed to have plotted the first arc and come up with many of the concepts for following story arcs. This has been publicly disputed by Boom and credited series writer Ian Brill. However, artist James Silvani has publicly credited Sparrow not only with the idea of bringing the series back, but assisting him in ghost-writing much of the series and changing a lot of the concepts Brill brought to the series following Sparrow's departure from BOOM! Studios. This seems to be further corroborated by the fact that Sparrow and Silvani have both stated they did not write any of the final arc of the series, "Dangerous Currency", which was largely panned by fans for having many glaring character inconsistencies, particularly in the case of the character Gizmoduck.

Darkwing Duck creator Tad Stones has also publicly credited Sparrow as bringing the character back in a 2010 BOOM! Kids "Get A Sketch" panel at San Diego Comic-Con. Sparrow continues to make public appearances with Silvani and Stones, and Brill does not. In a 2011 livestream interview Tad Stones admitted he was unhappy with later issues of the series, and particularly criticized the election arc, which he "tried to talk them out of". When questioned on whether he had read the entire comic series he stated: "Not the later stuff. I applaud what James tried to do. I hear he saved them but I thought the central premises were wrong."

Sparrow served as moderator at the 2013 Comic-Con panel "25 Years of the Disney Afternoon: The Continuing Legacy", which featured Tad Stones, voice actors Jim Cummings and Rob Paulsen, TaleSpin creator Jymn Magon, and Darkwing Duck comic artist James Silvani, associations which would seem to further corroborate his version of events.

In 2013, Disney European publisher Egmont Group released a compendium of several of the BOOM! Studios Darkwing Duck stories, including "The Duck Knight Returns", "Crisis On Infinite Darkwings", and "F.O.W.L. Disposition". Aaron Sparrow's story credits were not only restored, but he and Silvani created an all-new 3-page introduction, and Brill's dialogue was replaced with original dialogue by Sparrow.

On October 22, 2014, comic news website Bleeding Cool announced that the first 16 issues of Darkwing Duck would be packaged together and published in an omnibus by Joe Books. On his Tumblr account, Silvani stated that the omnibus would be a remastered edition, featuring revised art, a new epilogue, and that the script had been "painstakingly rewritten" by Sparrow. It was also announced that the omnibus would lead into a new monthly series written by Sparrow and drawn by Silvani, with no involvement by Brill. The omnibus only collects the first 16 issues and the annual, omitting the final "Dangerous Currency" crossover with DuckTales, seeming to further call into question Brill's claims of sole authorship.

On January 18, 2016, Joe Books Twitter feed reported that Darkwing Duck would be returning to monthly comics beginning in April 2016 with Sparrow and Silvani at the helm.

According to Silvani's Twitter account, "Dangerous Currency" has been declared non-canon by Disney, and will not be referenced within the new series.

==== Dynamite Entertainment ====
A new comic book series based on the show, which is written by Amanda Deibert and illustrated by Carlo Cid Lauro instead of the team from the previous comic, began publication at Dynamite Entertainment in January 2023. In addition, Dynamite will re-release the original 1991 comic book run.

Dynamite Entertainment revealed a new comic series in June 2023 featuring Negaduck would be released in September written by Jeff Parker and illustrated by Ciro Cangialosi.

Dynamite Entertainment announced another comic series in September 2023 featuring the Justice Ducks would be released in December written by Roger Langridge and illustrated by Carlo Lauro.

Dynamite Entertainment started a kickstarter in June 2024 with the goal of 25k, easily reaching the goal and surpassing it within minutes. Reaching 100k pledges before the night was over. Selling three omnibuses's featuring the classic Darkwing Duck Comics along with their 'The Justice Ducks' and Negaduck's comics under Heroes and Villains, Cowl and Fowl, and Darkly Dawns the Duck. By July 3 with the kickstarter concluded, they had 344k pledged. One reward in the 150k stretch goal for backers was a limited edition cover drawn by Tad Stones for an upcoming Darkwing Duck series scheduled for the fall of 2024.

Dynamite Entertainment announced November 22, a new run of the Darkwing Duck comic would start February 2025. The first issue would start with a Darkwing Duck cover drawn by Tad Stones, followed by being written by Daniel Kibblesmith and drawn by Ted Brandt and Ro Stein.

=== Cameos on other television series ===
- Goof Troop (1992–1993): Quackerjack makes a cameo on Max's watch in the episode "Axed by Addition". In some episodes, Darkwing Duck makes a cameo on the comics and on TV.
- Raw Toonage (1992): Gosalyn made a guest appearance.
- Bonkers (1993–1994): In a dream sequence, Bonkers accepts an award for best cartoon crime-fighter from Darkwing, who is jealous he did not win it himself. Darkwing later makes three more cameos in three other Bonkers episodes.
- Aladdin (1994–1995): In the episode "My Fair Aladdin", the Genie transformed into Darkwing Duck.
- Quack Pack (1996):
- Robot Chicken (2011): In the episode "Kramer vs. Showgirls", a "Where Are They Now" segment revolves around cartoon characters from the 1990s, including Darkwing Duck. Launchpad was killed in a mishap with US Airways Flight 1549 and when Gosalyn needed a kidney transplant, Darkwing donated his body to a Chinese restaurant where he was cooked alive.
- Funny or Die had an April Fool's sketch in 2013 where lead voice actor Jim Cummings tried to crowdfund a Darkwing Duck animated film created all by himself.

==== DuckTales ====
In the DuckTales reboot, Darkwing Duck plays a major recurring role. At first, it appeared as an old television show which Launchpad McQuack is a fan of. The show itself first appears in the episode "Beware the B.U.D.D.Y. System!", which depicts Darkwing fighting Quackerjack, the Liquidator, and Megavolt. While watching the episode, Launchpad states that the actor portraying Darkwing is "an old school actor who did all his own stunts" named Jim Starling – a spoof of his voice actor, Jim Cummings; who reprises his role as the character alongside Michael Bell as Quackerjack. Other references include St. Canard's name being stated in the premiere episode and the name of the evil organization F.O.W.L. appearing as Easter eggs. Additionally, both F.O.W.L. and S.H.U.S.H. appeared in "From the Confidential Case Files of Agent 22!" The end-credits theme of Darkwing Duck appears in "The Last Crash of the Sunchaser!" as part of the show-within-a-show. In "Friendship Hates Magic", Launchpad and Mrs. Beakley watch a Darkwing Duck episode based on an actual episode, "The Haunting of Mr. Banana Brain", featuring Paddywhack.

Darkwing's first major role is in "The Duck Knight Returns", with Drake Mallard (Chris Diamantopoulos) replacing Jim Starling as Darkwing in a movie produced by Scrooge McDuck. After an insane Starling's attempt to kill Mallard results in the set's explosion and the former's presumed death, the movie is canceled. However, Launchpad convinces Drake to become a real superhero, while Starling, having secretly survived the explosion, becomes Negaduck. Drake later reappears in "Moonvasion!" to help thwart the Moonlanders, and at the end of the episode, F.O.W.L. plots to eliminate Scrooge and his family following the trouble they essentially caused; with Steelbeak (Jason Mantzoukas) among their ranks. Darkwing features prominently in the two-part episode "Let's Get Dangerous!", which introduces new incarnations of Gosalyn (Stephanie Beatriz) and Taurus Bulba (James Monroe Iglehart). In the series finale "The Last Adventure!" Drake and Gosalyn attend Webby Vanderquack's birthday party before assisting the Duck family in their final battle against F.O.W.L., during which the pair battle Steelbeak.

=== Films ===
Darkwing makes a cameo at the end of Chip 'n Dale: Rescue Rangers, with Cummings reprising his role. He appears during a mid-credits scene, annoyed at the Rescue Rangers' newly regained fame and trying to attract attention to himself.

== Reboot ==
On April 2, 2015, a rumor surfaced that Disney would be rebooting the series for a 2018 premiere on Disney XD. The report was debunked as an April Fools' prank. Instead, Darkwing Duck returned as a comic book published by Joe Books, which was released on April 27, 2016.

A Darkwing Duck reboot is in development for Disney+. Seth Rogen and Evan Goldberg will executive produce the project via Point Grey Pictures. Tad Stones revealed that he is involved in the reboot series as a creative consultant. While Disney TVA employee Ben Siemon claimed in 2022 that it had been cancelled, Stones clarified in July 2024 that the reboot is still in development, albeit with the original writer's room having been disbanded a month prior. In March 2025, it was revealed that Cummings would reprise his role as Darkwing Duck for the reboot.

In August 2025, Cummings confirmed that the show would actually be a revival series that would take place sometime after the events of the original show, with him comparing it to The Dark Knight Returns since it featured an older Darkwing and Gosalyn. The actor also confirmed that it involved Darkwing deciding to resume his vigilantism after retiring for a long period of time.

In March 2026, during an interview with Screen Rant, Cummings revealed that they had "recorded basically one offshoot so far" and confirmed executive producer Seth Rogen is actively involved as a "prime mover" on the project.

In August 2026, in an interview with Collider, Cummings said that he will not reprise his role as Darkwing Duck and that it will be recast. He also said he recorded a pilot "several years ago", and that everyone "went nuts".

In September 2026, the reboot was given a series order, with the premise following Darkwing as he enters an alternate reality where no one has heard of him. The voice cast includes Mark Hamill as Drake Mallard/Darkwing Duck, Seth Rogen as Launchpad McQuack, Lizzy Caplan as Gosalyn, Lilimar Hernandez as Duckie, Dan Stevens as Glade McTowers, Tiffany Shepis as Rosa, Kathryn Newton as Firecracker, Teo Briones as Timb, Tyler Dean Flores as Pondsy, Katie Rich as Officer Shanks and Nat Faxon as Officer Webb. Sean Tretta and Borja Peña Gorostegui serve as writers and executive producers on the series.

== See also ==
- Paperinik, a superhero alter ego of Donald Duck

== Bibliography ==
- Lenburg, Jeff (1999). The Encyclopedia of Animated Cartoons. New York: Facts on File. ISBN 0816038317.
- Terrace, Vincent (2009). Encyclopedia of Television Shows, 1925 Through 2007. Vol. 1. McFarland & Company. p. 350. ISBN 978-0-7864-3305-6 – via the Internet Archive.
