= List of feature films described as non-narrative =

The distinction between non-narrative film and "narrative films" can be rather vague and is open for interpretation. Few filmmakers would define their works as non-narrative. The following list contains films which have been described as "non-narrative" by independent sources.

== List ==
Title	Year	Country	Director(s)	Cinematographer(s)	Music	Runtime	Ref(s)
13 Lakes	2004	(United States)	James Benning		—N/a	133 mins	
23rd Psalm Branch	1967	(United States)	Stan Brakhage		—N/a	78 mins	
L'Age d'Or	1930	(France)	Luis Buñuel	Albert Duverger	Luis Buñuel, Georges van Parys	63 mins	
Ashes and Snow	2005	(United States)	Gregory Colbert		Gregory Colbert	63 mins	
Atlantis	1991	(France) / (Italy)	Luc Besson		Éric Serra	78 mins	
Baraka	1992	(United States)	Ron Fricke		Michael Stearns	97 mins	
Bestiaire	2012	(Canada) / (France)	Denis Côté	Vincent Biron	—N/a	72 mins	
Blue	1993	(Japan) / (United Kingdom)	Derek Jarman		Simon Fisher-Turner	79 mins	
Bodysong	2003	(United Kingdom)	Simon Pummell		Jonny Greenwood	78 mins	
The Clock	2010	(United Kingdom)	Christian Marclay		—N/a	24 hours	
Decasia	2002	(United States)	Bill Morrison		Michael Gordon	67 mins	
Diva Dolorosa	1999	(Netherlands)	Peter Delpeut		Loek Dikker	70 mins	
Dogora: Ouvrons les yeux	2004	(France)	Patrice Leconte	Jean-Marie Dreujou	Étienne Perruchon	80 mins	
Earth from Above	2004	(France)	Renaud Delourme	Laurent Fleutot, Daniel Marchetti	Armand Amar	67 mins	
Empire	1965	(United States)	Andy Warhol, John Palmer	Jonas Mekas	—N/a	485 mins	
The Falls	1980	(United Kingdom)	Peter Greenaway	Mike Coles, John Rosenberg	Michael Nyman	240 mins	
Field Niggas	2015	(United States)	Khalik Allah		—N/a	60 mins	
Film Socialisme	2010	(France) / (Switzerland)	Jean-Luc Godard	Fabrice Aragno, Paul Grivas	—N/a	102 mins	
Hitler: A Film from Germany	1977	(France) / (United Kingdom) / (West Germany)	Hans-Jürgen Syberberg	Dietrich Lohmann	—N/a	442 mins	
Koyaanisqatsi	1982	(United States)	Godfrey Reggio	Ron Fricke	Philip Glass	86 mins	
Laya Project	2007	(India)	Harold Monfils	Yuk Hoy Cheong, Agung Dewantoro	Yotam Agam, Patrick Sabag	67 mins	
Leviathan	2012	(France) / (United Kingdom) / (United States)	Lucien Castaing-Taylor, Véréna Paravel		—N/a	87 mins	
Lines	2016	(Greece)	Vassilis Mazomenos	George Papandrikopoulos	Dna	88 mins	
Man with a Movie Camera	1929	(Soviet Union)	Dziga Vertov	Mikhail Kaufman, Gleb Troyanski	—N/a	68 mins	
Microcosmos	1996	(France) / (Italy) / (Switzerland)	Claude Nuridsany, Marie Pérennou	Thierry Machado	Bruno Coulais	80 mins	
Mirror	1975	(Soviet Union)	Andrei Tarkovsky	Georgi Rerberg	Eduard Artemyev	108 mins	
Naqoyqatsi	2002	(United States)	Godfrey Reggio	Russell Lee Fine	Philip Glass	89 mins	
A Pigeon Sat on a Branch Reflecting on Existence	2011	(Denmark) / (France) / (Germany) / (Norway) / (Sweden)	Roy Andersson	István Borbás, Gergely Pálos	Stock music from various sources	101 mins	
Powaqqatsi	1988	(United States)	Godfrey Reggio	Graham Berry, Leonidas Zourdoumis	Philip Glass	99 mins	
Ruhr	2009	(Germany)	James Benning		—N/a	121 mins	
Samsara	2011	(United States)	Ron Fricke		Marcello de Francisci, Lisa Gerrard, Michael Stearns	102 mins	
Silence Above the Clouds	2009	(Slovakia)	Pavol Barabáš		Maok Martin Tesak	65 mins	
Sixty Spanish Cigarettes	2015	(Spain)	Mark John Ostrowski		Gabriel Prada	—N/a	
Sophie's Place	1986	(United States)	Larry Jordan		—N/a	90 mins	
Sweetgrass	2009	(France) / (United Kingdom) / (United States)	Lucien Castaing-Taylor		—N/a	101 mins	
El Valley Centro	2000	(United States)	James Benning		—N/a	90 mins	
Visitors	2013	(United States)	Godfrey Reggio	Graham Berry, Trish Govoni, Tom Lowe	Philip Glass	87 mins	
¡Vivan las Antipodas!	2011	(Argentina) / (Chile) / (Germany) / (Netherlands)	Victor Kossakovsky		Alexander Popov	108 mins	
Walden	1969	(United States)	Jonas Mekas		—N/a	177 mins	
Winged Migration	2001	(France) / (Germany) / (Italy) / (Spain) / (Switzerland) / (United States)	Jacques Perrin, Jacques Cluzaud, Michel Debats	Various	Bruno Coulais	97 mins	
Zorns Lemma	1970	(United States)	Hollis Frampton		—N/a	60 mins	
★	2017	(Austria)	Johann Lurf	-	-	130 mins	

== See also ==
- Category:Films without speech
- Nonlinear narrative
  - List of nonlinear narrative films
- Slow cinema
- Structural film
- Surrealist cinema
