= 18th Saturn Awards =

US film and television award ceremony

- Date: March 13, 1992
- Site: California, U.S.

Highlights
- Most awards: Terminator 2: Judgment Day (5)
- Most nominations: Terminator 2: Judgment Day (9)

The 18th Saturn Awards, honoring the best in science fiction, fantasy and horror film and television in 1991, were held on March 13, 1992.

== Winners and nominees ==
Below is a complete list of nominees and winners. Winners are highlighted in bold.

=== Film ===
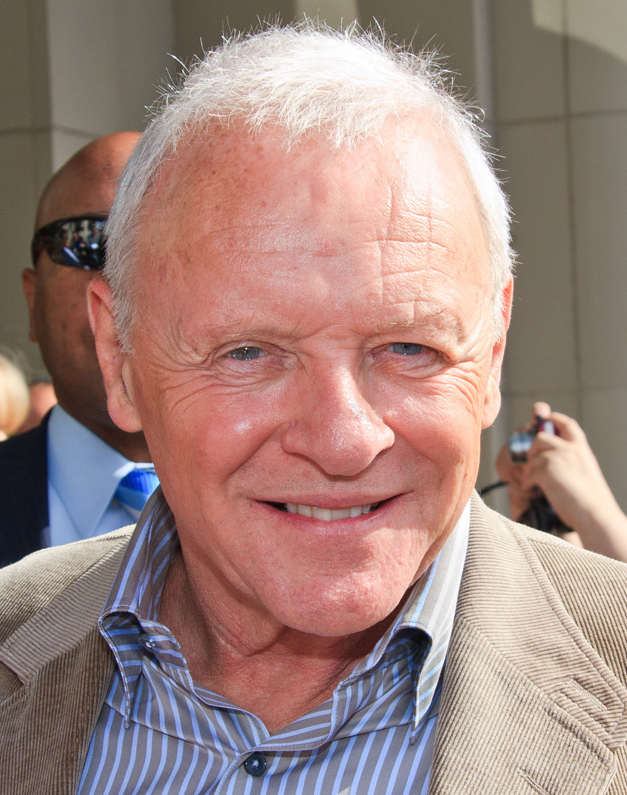
Anthony Hopkins, Best Actor winner

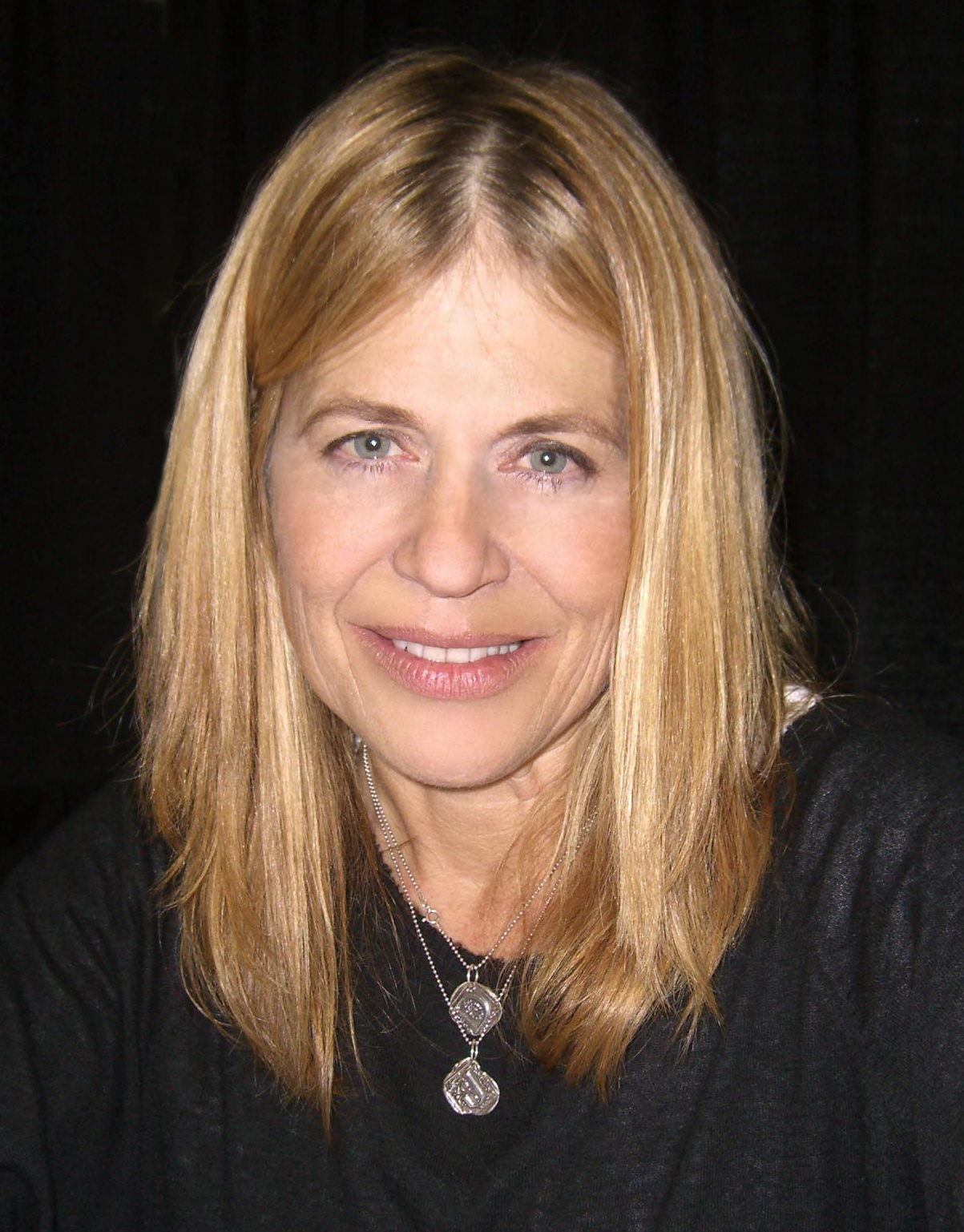
Linda Hamilton, Best Actress winner

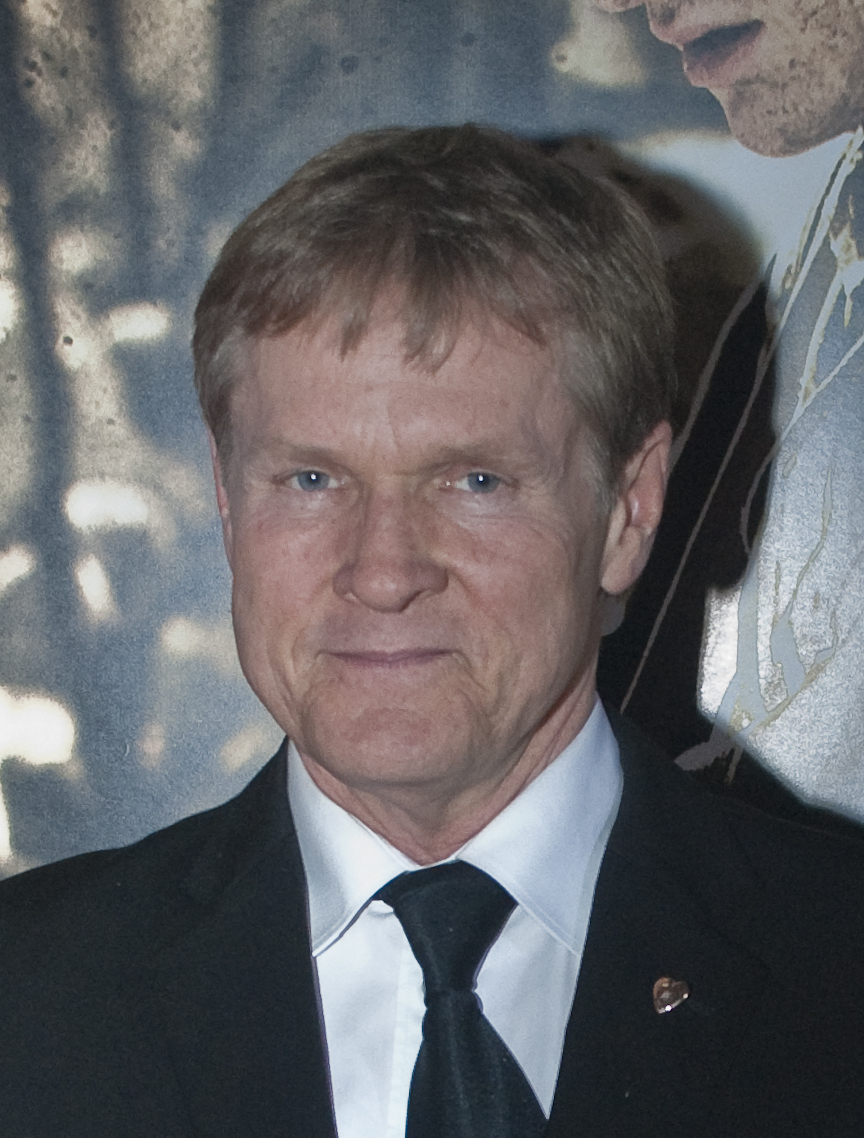
William Sadler, Best Supporting Actor winner

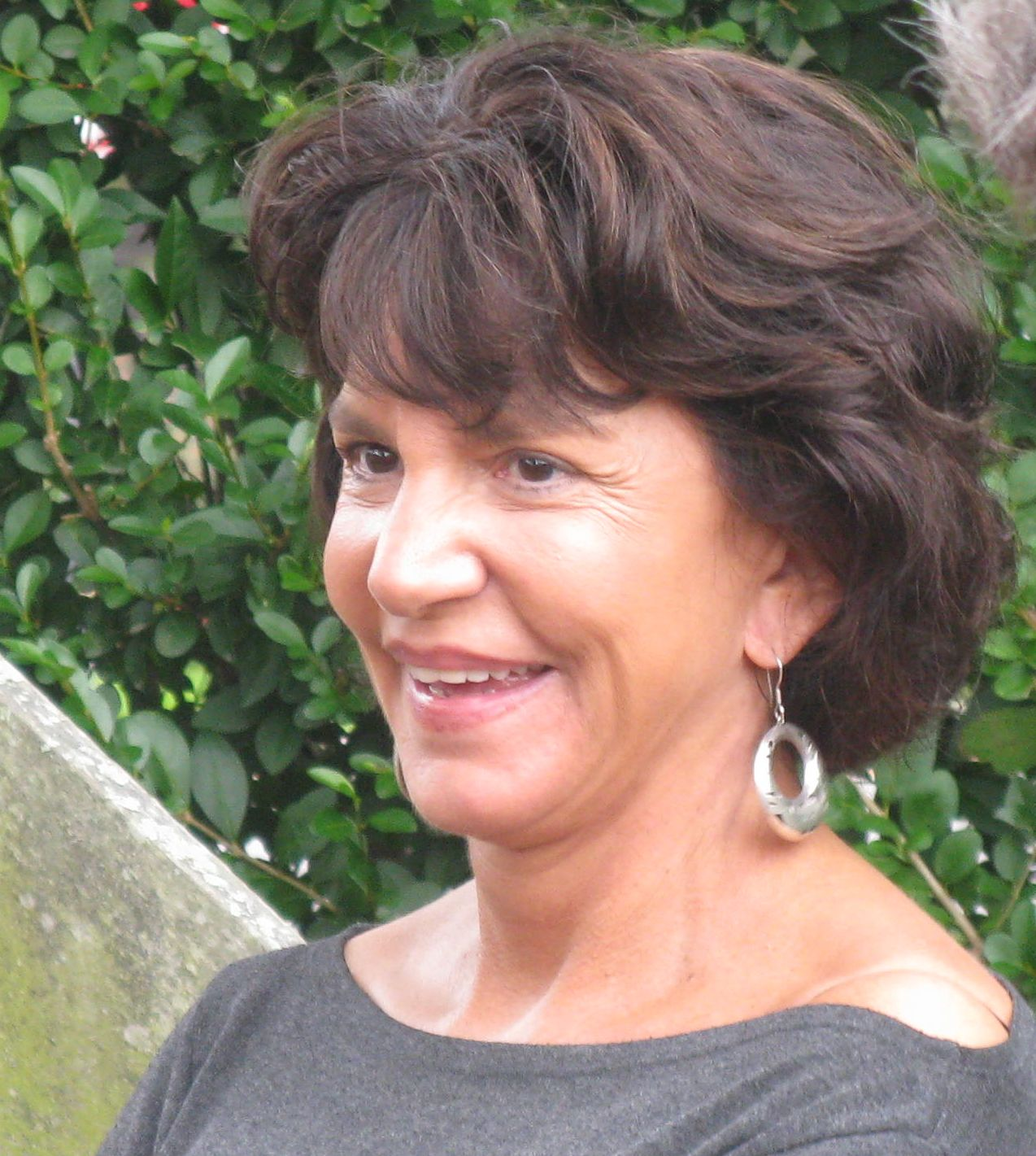
Mercedes Ruehl, Best Supporting Actress winner

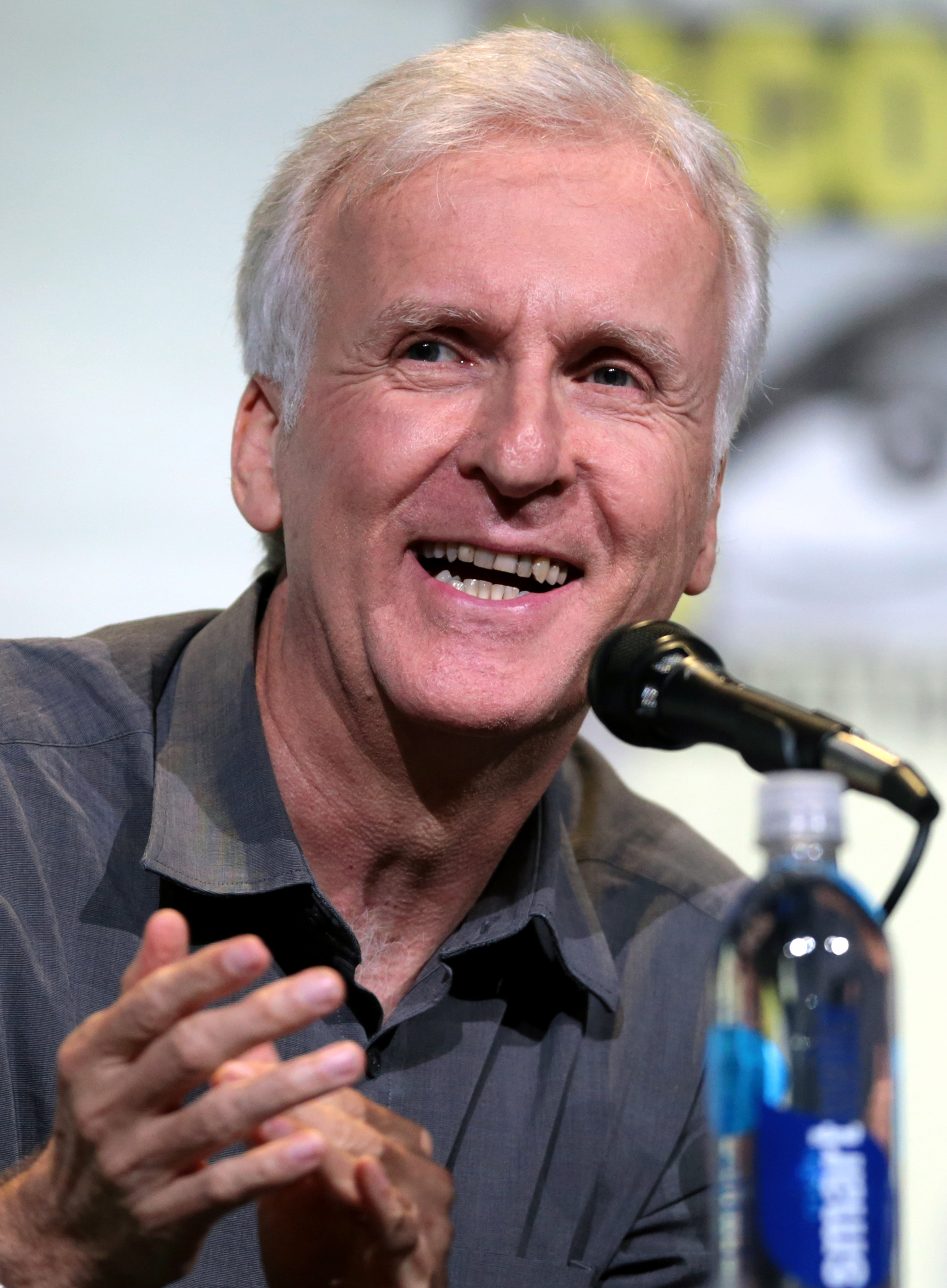
James Cameron, Best Director winner

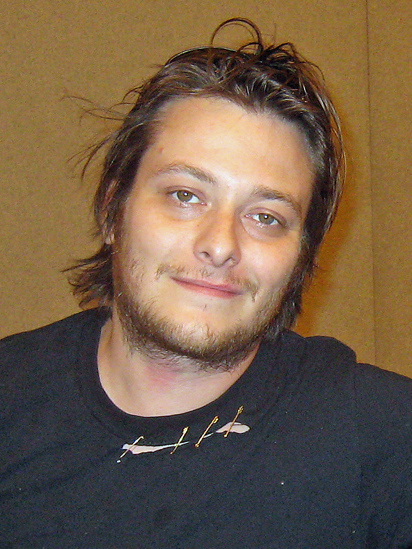
Edward Furlong, Best Performance by a Younger Actor winner

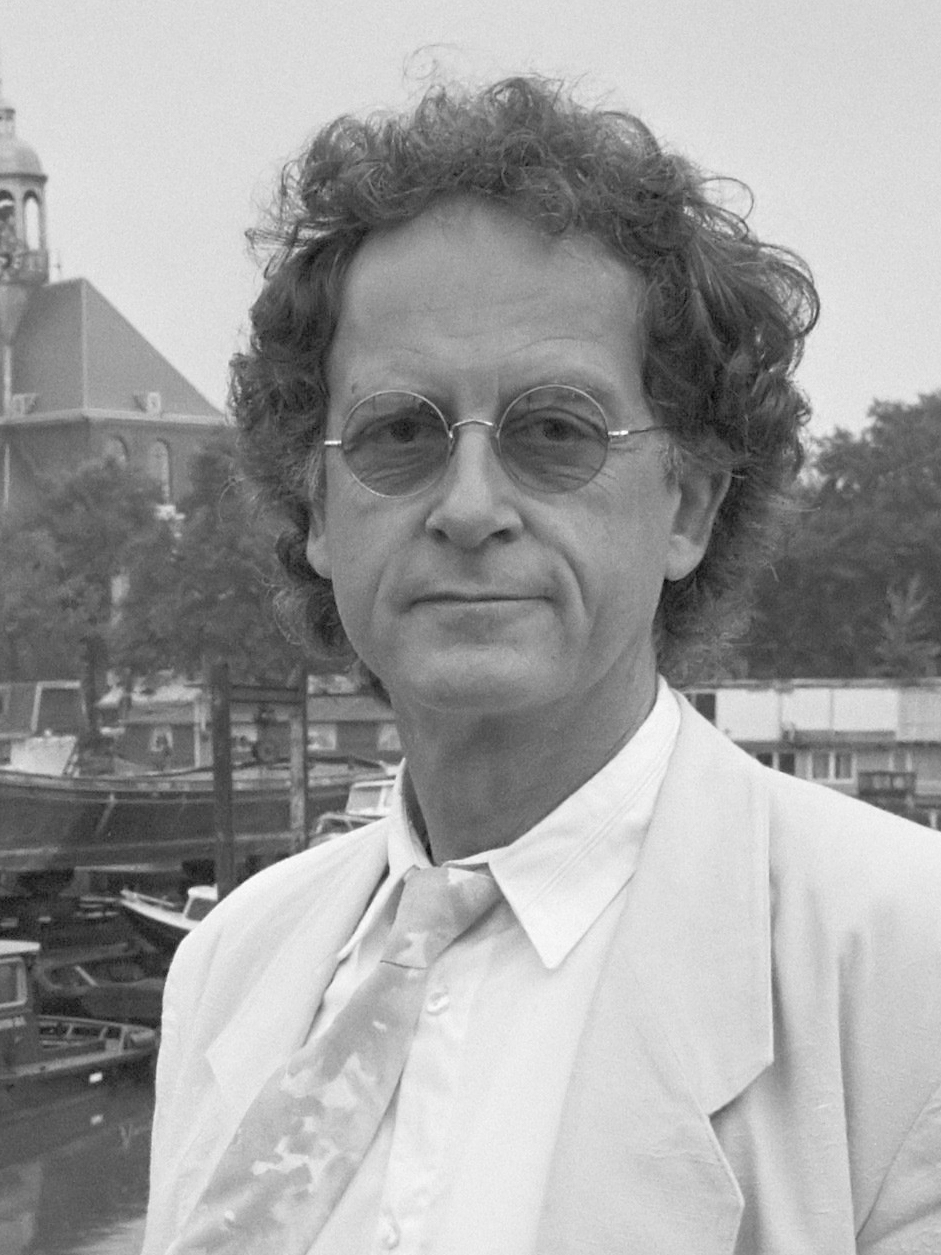
Loek Dikker, Best Music winner

Best Science Fiction Film	Best Fantasy Film
**Terminator 2: Judgment Day**; Frankenstein Unbound; Prayer of the Rollerboys; Predator 2; The Rocketeer; Timescape	**Edward Scissorhands**; Defending Your Life; The Fisher King; If Looks Could Kill; Robin Hood: Prince of Thieves; Warlock
Best Horror Film	Best Performance by a Younger Actor
**The Silence of the Lambs**; Body Parts; Children of the Night; Child's Play 3; Dolly Dearest; Misery; Night of the Living Dead; Sleeping with the Enemy	**Edward Furlong – Terminator 2: Judgment Day as John Connor**; Jonathan Brandis – The NeverEnding Story II: The Next Chapter as Bastian Bux; Chris Demetral – Dolly Dearest as Jimmy Wade; Corey Haim – Prayer of the Rollerboys as Griffin; Candace Hutson – Dolly Dearest as Jessica Wade; Joshua John Miller – And You Thought Your Parents Were Weird as Josh Carson; Justin Whalin – Child's Play 3 as Andy Barclay
Best Actor	Best Actress
**Anthony Hopkins – The Silence of the Lambs as Dr. Hannibal Lecter**; Jeff Bridges – The Fisher King as Jack Lucas; James Caan – Misery as Paul Sheldon; Kevin Costner – Robin Hood: Prince of Thieves as Robin Hood; Arnold Schwarzenegger – Terminator 2: Judgment Day as The Terminator; Robin Williams – The Fisher King as Parry	**Linda Hamilton – Terminator 2: Judgment Day as Sarah Connor**; Kathy Bates – Misery as Annie Wilkes; Jodie Foster – The Silence of the Lambs as Clarice Starling; Julia Roberts – Sleeping with the Enemy as Sara / Laura; Winona Ryder – Edward Scissorhands as Kim Boggs; Meryl Streep – Defending Your Life as Julia
Best Supporting Actor	Best Supporting Actress
**William Sadler – Bill & Ted's Bogus Journey as Death**; Alan Arkin – Edward Scissorhands as Bill Boggs; Patrick Bergin – Sleeping with the Enemy as Martin Burney; Wayne Newton – The Dark Backward as Jackie Chrome; Robert Patrick – Terminator 2: Judgment Day as T-1000; Alan Rickman – Robin Hood: Prince of Thieves as Sheriff of Nottingham	**Mercedes Ruehl – The Fisher King as Anne Napolitano**; Robin Bartlett – If Looks Could Kill as Patricia Grober; Jennifer Connelly – The Rocketeer as Jenny Blake; Mary Elizabeth Mastrantonio – Robin Hood: Prince of Thieves as Maid Marian; Frances Sternhagen – Misery as Virginia; Dianne Wiest – Edward Scissorhands as Peg Boggs
Best Director	Best Writing
**James Cameron – Terminator 2: Judgment Day**; Roger Corman – Frankenstein Unbound; William Dear – If Looks Could Kill; Jonathan Demme – The Silence of the Lambs; Terry Gilliam – The Fisher King; Eric Red – Body Parts	**Ted Tally – The Silence of the Lambs**; Albert Brooks – Defending Your Life; James Cameron and William Wisher Jr. – Terminator 2: Judgment Day; Charles Gale – Guilty as Charged; William Goldman – Misery; Richard LaGravenese – The Fisher King
Best Music	Best Costumes
**Loek Dikker – Body Parts**; Steve Bartek – Guilty as Charged; Danny Elfman – Edward Scissorhands; Jerry Goldsmith – Sleeping with the Enemy; Jerry Goldsmith – Warlock; Howard Shore – The Silence of the Lambs	**Marilyn Vance – The Rocketeer**; Colleen Atwood – Edward Scissorhands; Colleen Atwood – The Silence of the Lambs; John Bloomfield – Robin Hood: Prince of Thieves; Beatrix Aruna Pasztor – The Fisher King; Franca Zucchelli – Frankenstein Unbound
Best Make-up	Best Special Effects
**Carl Fullerton and Neal Martz – The Silence of the Lambs**; David B. Miller – Nothing but Trouble; Gordon J. Smith – Body Parts; John Vulich and Everett Burrell – Night of the Living Dead; Stan Winston and Scott H. Eddo – Predator 2; Stan Winston and Jeff Dawn – Terminator 2: Judgment Day	**Stan Winston (Industrial Light & Magic (ILM), Fantasy II Film Effects, 4Ward Productions) – Terminator 2: Judgment Day**; (Dream Quest Images, Perpetual Motion Pictures) – Warlock; Syd Dutton, Bill Taylor, and Gene Warren Jr. (Illusion Arts Inc.) – Frankenstein Unbound; Ken Ralston (Industrial Light & Magic) – The Rocketeer; Stan Winston and Joel Hynek (R/Greenberg Associates Inc.) – Predator 2; Richard Yuricich and Kevin Yagher (Video Image) – Bill & Ted's Bogus Journey

=== Television ===
Best Genre Television Series
- **Dark Shadows (NBC)**
  - Cast a Deadly Spell (HBO)
  - Psycho IV: The Beginning (Showtime)
  - Quantum Leap (NBC)
  - Star Trek: The Next Generation (Syndicated)
  - Tales from the Crypt (HBO)

=== Video ===
Best Genre Video Release
- **Soultaker**
  - Hider in the House
  - Pale Blood
  - The Pit and the Pendulum
  - Scanners II: The New Order
  - The Unborn

=== Special awards ===
George Pal Memorial Award

- Gene Roddenberry

Life Career Award

- Arnold Schwarzenegger

President's Award

- Robert Shaye

Special Award

- Ray Harryhausen
