= 1991 National Society of Film Critics Awards =

Annual US film awards ceremony

26th NSFC Awards

January 5, 1992

Best Film:
Life Is Sweet

The 26th National Society of Film Critics Awards, given on 5 January 1992, honored the best filmmaking of 1991.

== Winners ==
=== Best Picture ===
1. Life Is Sweet
2. Naked Lunch
3. Bugsy

=== Best Director ===
1. David Cronenberg – Naked Lunch
2. Mike Leigh – Life Is Sweet
3. Jonathan Demme – The Silence of the Lambs

=== Best Actor ===
1. River Phoenix – My Own Private Idaho
2. Warren Beatty – Bugsy
3. Nick Nolte – The Prince of Tides

=== Best Actress ===
1. Alison Steadman – Life Is Sweet
2. Jodie Foster – The Silence of the Lambs
3. Susan Sarandon – Thelma & Louise

=== Best Supporting Actor ===
1. Harvey Keitel – Thelma & Louise, Bugsy and Mortal Thoughts
2. Steven Hill – Billy Bathgate
3. Elliott Gould – Bugsy

=== Best Supporting Actress ===
1. Jane Horrocks – Life Is Sweet
2. Juliette Lewis – Cape Fear
3. Judy Davis – Naked Lunch

=== Best Screenplay ===
1. David Cronenberg – Naked Lunch
2. James Toback – Bugsy
3. Agnieszka Holland – Europa Europa
3. Calder Willingham – Rambling Rose

=== Best Cinematography ===
1. Roger Deakins – Barton Fink
2. Peter Suschitzky – Naked Lunch
3. Allen Daviau – Bugsy

=== Best Foreign Language Film ===
1. The Double Life of Veronique (La double vie de Véronique)
2. The Vanishing (Spoorloos)
3. Europa Europa

=== Best Documentary ===
1. Paris Is Burning
2. Hearts of Darkness: A Filmmaker's Apocalypse
3. American Dream
3. Madonna: Truth or Dare

=== Experimental Film ===
- Archangel

=== Special Citation ===
- Peter Delpeut – Lyrical Nitrate
