= Lost film =

Feature or short film that is no longer known to exist at all

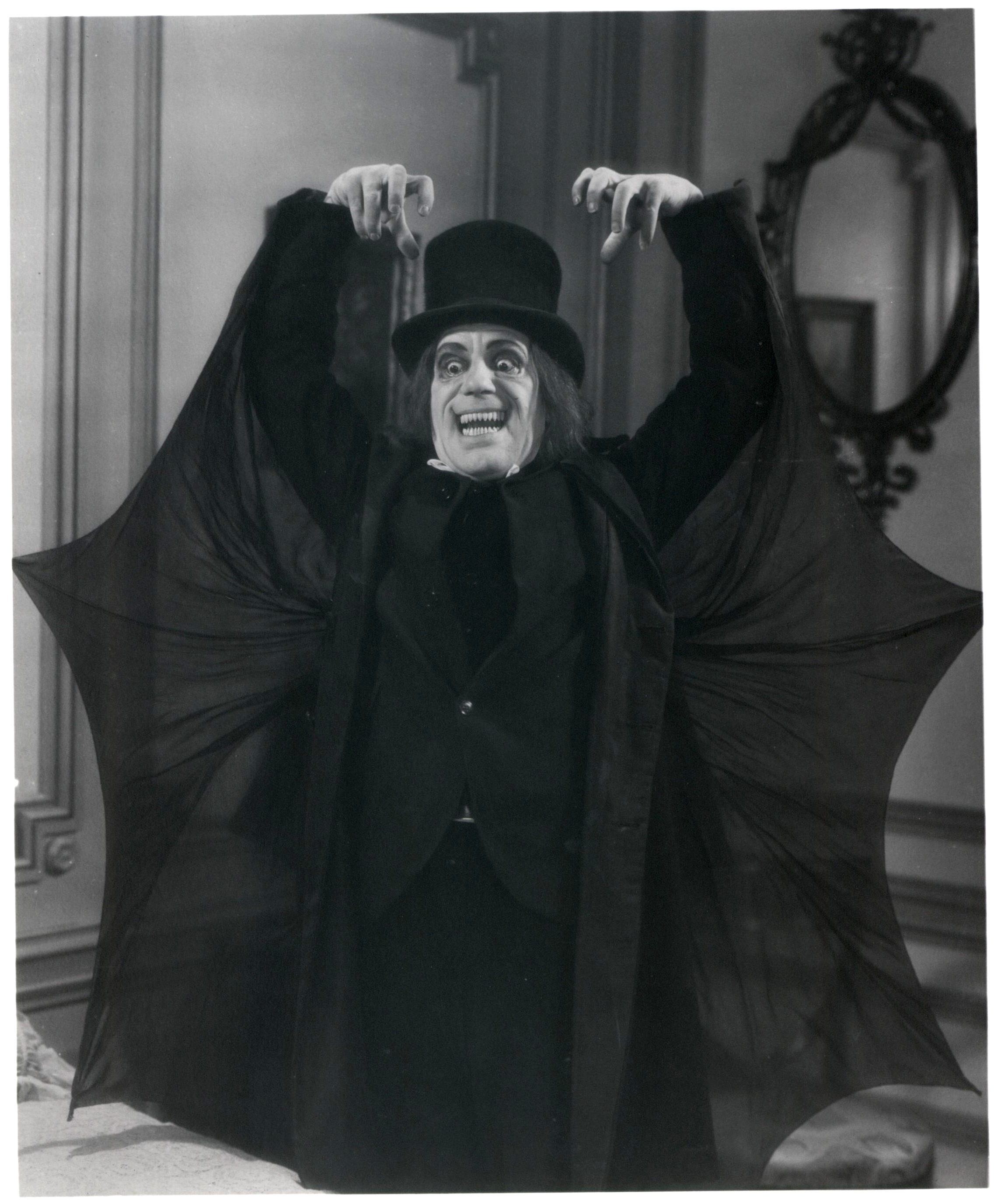
Lon Chaney in London After Midnight (1927), one of the most sought-after lost films, with the last known print of it being destroyed in the 1965 MGM vault fire. A set of production stills survives.

A lost film is a movie in which the original negative and all copies are not known to exist in any studio archive, private collection, or public archive. Films can be wholly or partially lost for a number of reasons. Early films were not thought to have value beyond their theatrical run, so many were discarded afterward. Nitrate film used in early pictures was highly flammable and susceptible to degradation. The Library of Congress began acquiring copies of American films in 1909, but not all were kept. Due to improvements in film technology and recordkeeping, few films produced in the 1950s or beyond have been lost.

Rarely, but occasionally, films classified as lost are found in an uncataloged or miscataloged archive or private collection, becoming "rediscovered films".

== Conditions ==
During most of the 20th century, American copyright law required at least one copy of every American film to be deposited at the Library of Congress at the time of copyright registration. However, the Librarian of Congress was not required to retain those copies: "Under the provisions of the act of March 4, 1909, authority is granted for the return to the claimant of copyright of such copyright deposits as are not required by the Library." A report by Library of Congress film historian and archivist David Pierce estimates that:

- around 75% of original silent-era films have perished;
- 14% of the 10,919 silent films released by major studios exist in their original 35 mm or other formats;
- 11% survive only in full-length foreign versions or film formats of lesser image quality.

Of the American sound films made from 1927 to 1950, an estimated half have been lost.

The phrase "lost film" or "lost media" can also be used for instances where footage of deleted scenes, unedited, and alternative versions of feature films are known to have been created but can no longer be accounted for. Sometimes, a copy of a lost film is rediscovered. A film that has not been recovered in its entirety is called a partially lost film. For example, the 1922 film Sherlock Holmes was considered lost but eventually rediscovered with some of the original footage missing.

== Stills ==
Many film studios hired a still photographer to take pictures during production for potential publicity use. Some are produced in quantity for display use by theaters, others in smaller numbers for distribution to newspapers and magazines, and have subsequently preserved imagery from otherwise lost films.

In some cases, such as London After Midnight, the surviving coverage is so extensive that an entire lost film can be reconstructed scene by scene from still photographs. Stills have been used to stand in for missing footage when making new preservation prints of partially lost films: for example, with the Gloria Swanson picture Sadie Thompson.

== Reasons for film loss ==
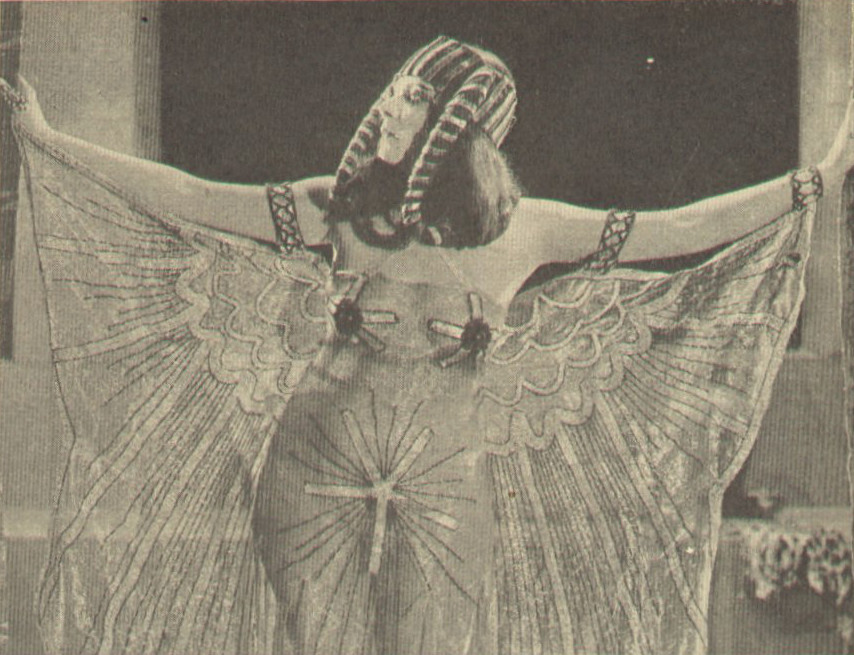
Theda Bara in Cleopatra (1917). Four hundred stills, one minute of the film itself, and the intro are known to have survived.

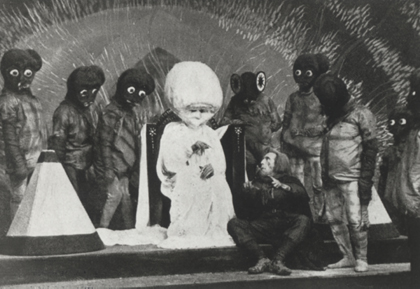
The First Men in the Moon (1919), a lost British film, reputedly "the first movie to ever be based entirely on a famous science fiction novel"

Most lost films originate from the silent film and early talkie era, from about 1894 to 1930. Martin Scorsese's Film Foundation estimates that more than 90% of American films produced before 1929 are lost, and the Library of Congress estimates that 75% of all silent films are lost forever.

The largest cause of silent-film loss is intentional destruction. Before the eras of home cinema, television and home video, films were considered to have little future value when their theatrical runs ended. Similarly, silent films were perceived as worthless after the end of the silent era. Film preservationist Robert A. Harris has said, "Most of the early films did not survive because of wholesale junking by the studios. There was no thought of ever saving these films. They simply needed vault space and the materials were expensive to house." The studios could earn money by recycling film for its silver content. Many Technicolor two-color negatives from the 1920s and 1930s were discarded when studios simply refused to reclaim their films, still being held by Technicolor in its vaults. Some used prints were sold to scrap dealers and ultimately edited into short segments for use with small, hand-cranked 35 mm movie projectors, which were sold as a toy for showing brief excerpts from Hollywood films at home.

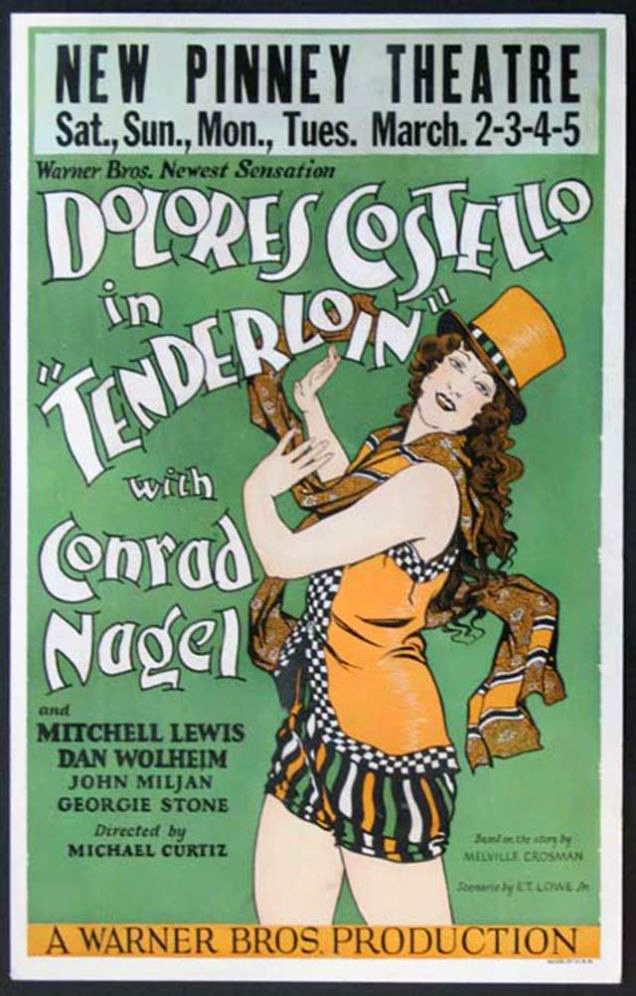
Tenderloin (1928), starring Dolores Costello, the second Vitaphone feature to have talking sequences, is considered a lost film because only its soundtrack is known to have survived.

Many other early motion pictures are lost because the nitrate film employed for nearly all 35 mm negatives and prints created before 1952 was highly flammable unless carefully conditioned and handled. When in very badly deteriorated condition and improperly stored (such as in a sun-baked shed), nitrate film can spontaneously combust. Fires have destroyed entire archives of films, such as the 1937 storage-vault fire that destroyed all the original negatives of pre-1935 films made by Fox Pictures and the 1965 MGM vault fire that destroyed hundreds of silent films and early talkies, including London After Midnight, now considered among the greatest of all lost films. Eastman Kodak introduced a nonflammable 35 mm film stock in 1909; however, the plasticizers employed to increase the film's flexibility evaporated too quickly, rendering the film dry and brittle and causing splices to separate and perforations to tear. By 1911, the major American film studios had reverted to nitrate stock. "Safety film" was relegated to sub-35 mm formats such as 16 mm and 8 mm until improvements were made in the late 1940s.

Nitrate film is also chemically unstable and over time can decay into a sticky mass or a powder akin to gunpowder. This process can be very unpredictable; some nitrate film from the 1890s is still in good condition, while some much later nitrate film was scrapped as unsalvageable at barely 20 years old. Much depends on the environment in which the film is stored. Ideal conditions of low temperature, low humidity and adequate ventilation can preserve nitrate film for centuries, but in practice, storage conditions have usually fallen far below this level. When a film on nitrate base is said to have been "preserved", this almost always means simply that it has been copied onto safety film or, more recently, digitized, but both methods result in some loss of quality.

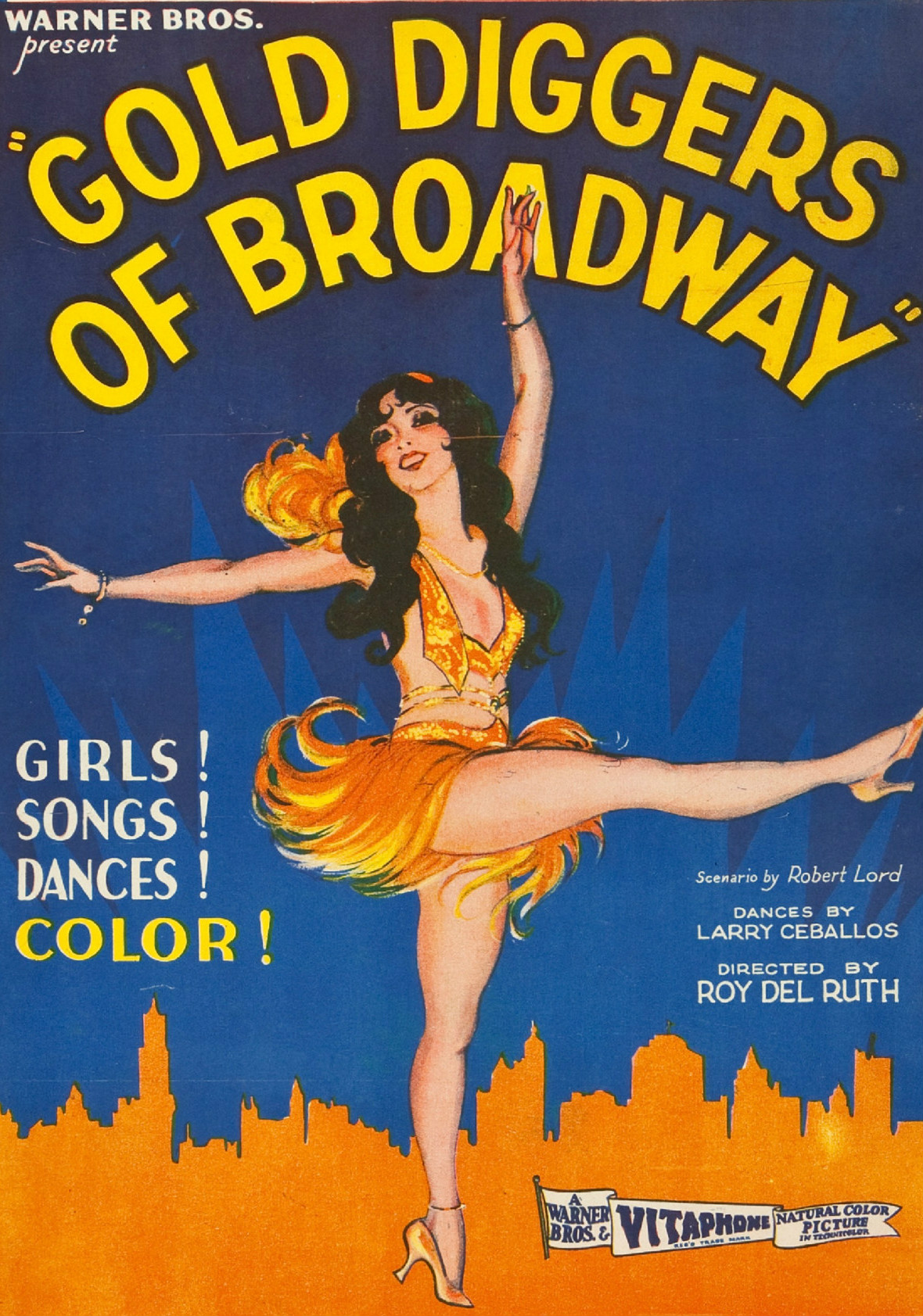
Gold Diggers of Broadway (1929), the third Warner Bros. Pictures film shot in Technicolor, is a "partially lost film".

Some pre-1931 sound films produced by Warner Bros. and First National have been lost because they used a sound-on-disc system with a separate soundtrack on special phonograph records. In the 1950s, when 16 mm sound-on-film reduction prints of early talkies were produced for television syndication, such films without complete soundtrack discs were at risk of permanent loss. Many sound-on-disc films have survived only by way of these 16 mm prints.

As a consequence of this widespread lack of care, the work of many early filmmakers and performers exists in the present day only in fragmentary form. A high-profile example is the case of Theda Bara, one of the most famous actresses of the early silent era. Bara appeared in 40 films, but only six are now known to exist. Clara Bow was equally celebrated in her heyday, but 20 of her 57 films are completely lost, and another five are incomplete. Once-popular stage actresses who transitioned to silent films, such as Pauline Frederick and Elsie Ferguson, have little left of their film performances. Fewer than ten movies exist from Frederick's work from 1915 to 1928, and Ferguson has two surviving films, one from 1919 and the other from 1930, her only talkie. All of the film performances of the stage actress and Bara rival Valeska Suratt have been lost. Most of the starring performances of Katherine MacDonald are gone save for a couple of costar appearances. All of George Walsh's Fox appearances have disappeared. Only three of the films of Fox's William Farnum, an early screen Western star, have survived. Others, such as Francis X. Bushman and William Desmond, accumulated numerous film credits, but films produced in their heyday are missing because of junking, neglect, warfare or the demise of their studios. However, unlike Suratt and Bara, because Bushman and Desmond continued working into the sound era and even on television, their later performances survive.

Films were sometimes destroyed deliberately. In 1921, actor Roscoe "Fatty" Arbuckle was charged with the murder of actress Virginia Rappe. Following a series of trials, he was ultimately acquitted, but not before his name had become so toxic that studios engaged in the systematic destruction of all films in which he had a starring role. The Charlie Chaplin-produced A Woman of the Sea was destroyed by Chaplin himself as a tax write-off.

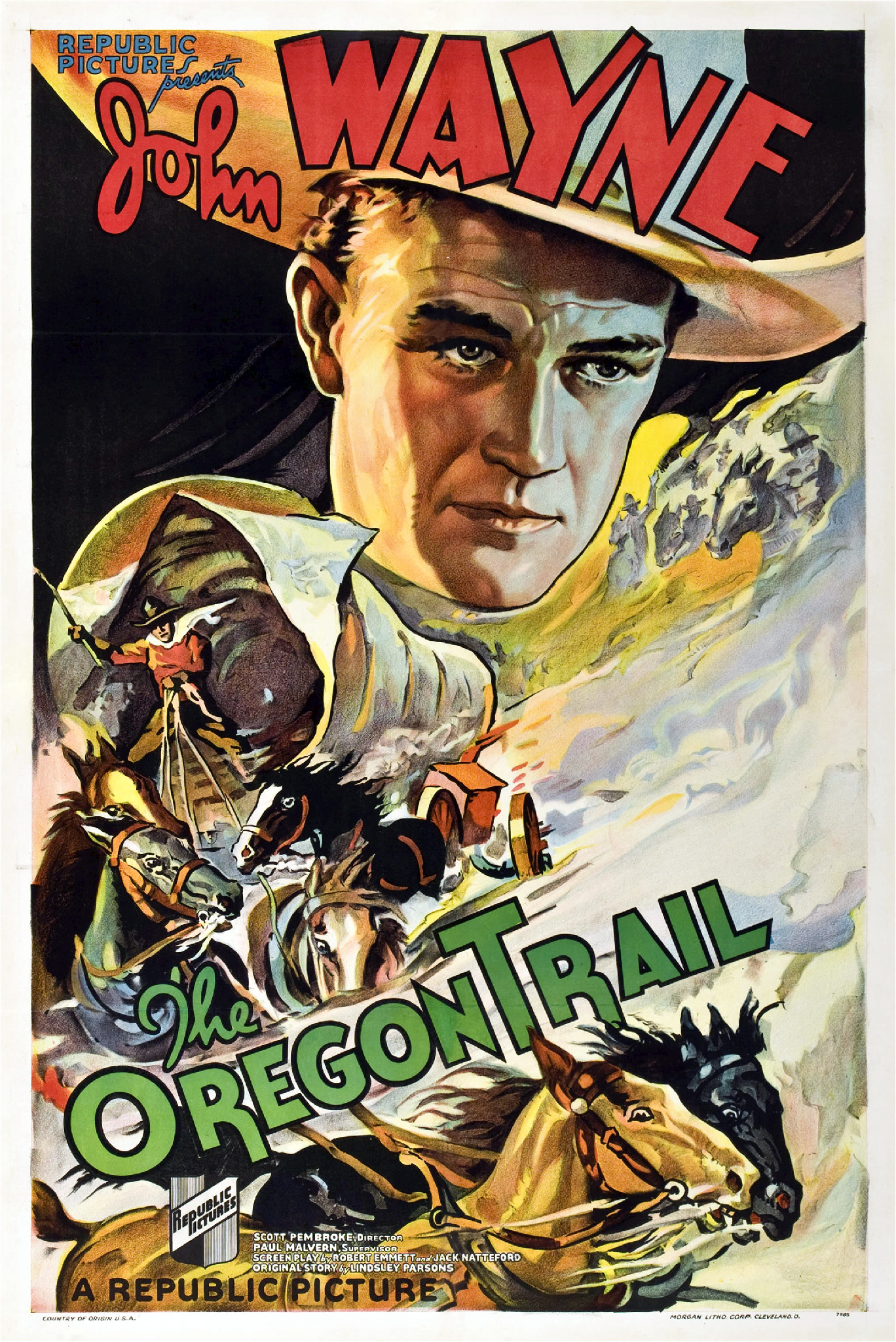
John Wayne in the lost Western The Oregon Trail (1936)

In contrast, the filmography of D. W. Griffith is nearly complete, as many of his early Biograph films were deposited by the company in paper print form at the Library of Congress. Many of Griffith's feature-film works of the 1910s and 1920s were added to the film collection at the Museum of Modern Art in the 1930s and were preserved under the auspices of curator Iris Barry. Mary Pickford's filmography is nearly complete. Her early years were spent with Griffith, and she gained control of her own productions in the late 1910s and early 1920s. She had originally intended to destroy these films but later relented. She also recovered as many of her Adolph Zukor-controlled early Famous Players films as were salvageable. Western star William S. Hart, an influence on such later filmmakers as Akira Kurosawa, has a tremendous amount of surviving feature work with only a few lost films. Likewise, almost all of the films created by Charlie Chaplin have survived, as well as extensive amounts of unused footage dating back to 1916; the exceptions are the aforementioned A Woman of the Sea and one of his early Keystone films, Her Friend the Bandit. Stars such as Chaplin and Douglas Fairbanks benefited from their great popularity: because their films were repeatedly reissued throughout the silent era, surviving prints could be found even decades later. Pickford, Chaplin, Harold Lloyd and Cecil B. DeMille were early champions of film preservation, although Lloyd lost a large number of his silent works to a vault fire in the early 1940s.

In March 2019, the National Film Archive of India reported that 31,000 of its film reels had been lost or destroyed.

== Later lost films ==
An improved 35 mm safety film was introduced in 1949. Since safety film is much more stable than nitrate film, comparatively few films were lost after about 1950. However, color fading of certain color stocks and vinegar syndrome threaten the preservation of films made since that time.

Most mainstream films from the 1950s and later survive today, but several early pornographic films and some B movies are lost. In most cases, these obscure films are unnoticed and unknown, but some films by noted cult directors have been lost as well.

- Several films by Kenneth Anger from throughout his career have been lost for a variety of reasons.
- The 1972 film The Undergraduate, directed by Ed Wood, was once believed lost, but has since been found and released on DVD. His 1971 film Necromania was believed lost for years until an edited version resurfaced at a yard sale in 1992, followed by a complete unedited print in 2001. A complete print of Wood's previously lost pornographic film The Young Marrieds was discovered in 2004. His 1970 film Take It Out in Trade was thought to exist only in fragments without sound, released on home video in 1995 as Take It Out in Trade: The Outtakes, until the release of a scanned 16mm theatrical print on Blu-ray Disc in 2018.
- The Noble Experiment (1955), the first feature film by director/writer Tom Graeff (in which he played a misunderstood genius scientist), was considered lost for many years until it was found by Elle Schneider during the production of The Boy from Out of This World, a documentary about Graeff.
- Most of the early films of Andy Milligan are considered lost.
- Many short sponsored films produced for educational, training or religious purposes from the 1940s through the 1970s are lost, as they were considered disposable or upgradable.
- Some of the first roles of Jackie Chan and Sammo Hung, including those in Big and Little Wong Tin Bar, were considered lost until their discovery and rerelease in 2016.
- The first three films of noted Finnish melodramatic actor and director Teuvo Tulio were lost, along with several other films of interest for historians of Finnish cinema, when Adams Filmi's film depository was destroyed by fire in Helsinki in 1959.
- Some early color films such as The Show of Shows (1929) and Golden Dawn (1930) exist only in partial or complete black-and-white format because the extant copies were created on black-and-white stock.
- Two three-dimensional films from 1954, Top Banana and Southwest Passage, survived in two-dimensional format only because only one print, made for either the left or right eye, was known to exist. The four missing reels from the right side of Southwest Passage were ultimately located in a UK film lab in 2018.
- The original versions of some films that have undergone revision or reediting have been destroyed.

== Lost film soundtracks ==
Some films produced from 1926 to 1931 using the Vitaphone sound-on-disc system, in which the soundtrack is separate from the film, are now considered lost because the soundtrack discs were lost or destroyed, while the picture elements survive. Conversely, and more commonly, some early sound films survive only as sets of soundtrack discs, with the picture elements completely missing, such as The Man from Blankley's (1930), or surviving only in fragmentary form, such as Gold Diggers of Broadway (1929) and The Rogue Song (1930), two highly popular and profitable early musicals in two-color Technicolor.

Many stereophonic soundtracks from the early to mid-1950s that were either played in interlock on a 35 mm full-coat magnetic reel or single-strip magnetic film (such as Fox's four-track magnetic, which became the standard of magnetic stereophonic sound) are now lost. Films such as House of Wax, The Caddy, The War of the Worlds, War and Peace, The 5,000 Fingers of Dr. T. and From Here to Eternity that were initially available with three-track magnetic sound are now available only with monophonic optical soundtracks. The process by which magnetic particles adhere to the tri-acetate film base eventually caused the autocatalytic breakdown of the film (vinegar syndrome). As long as studios had a monaural optical negative that could be printed, studio executives felt no need to preserve the stereophonic versions of the soundtracks.

The original isolated scoring session recordings for the soundtrack of the 1968 musical-fantasy Chitty Chitty Bang Bang were either lost or discarded when United Artists merged its archives, with only the original cut soundtrack recording on the standard 12-inch LP left, as well as several CD releases with mediocre remastering, although still lacking the complete score without dialogue.

== List of incomplete or partially lost films ==
This list consists of films for which any footage survives, including trailers and clips reused in other films.

== Rediscovered films ==
Occasionally, prints of films considered lost have been rediscovered. An example is the 1910 version of Frankenstein, which was believed lost for decades until the existence of a print (which had been in the hands of an unwitting collector for years) was discovered in the 1970s. A print of Richard III (1912) was found in 1996 and restored by the American Film Institute. In 2013, an early Mary Pickford film, Their First Misunderstanding, notable for being the first film in which she was credited by name, was found in a New Hampshire barn and donated to Keene State College.

Beyond the Rocks (1922), with Gloria Swanson and Rudolph Valentino, was considered a lost film for several decades. Swanson lamented the loss of this and other films in her 1980 memoirs but optimistically concluded: "I do not believe these films are gone forever." In 2000, a print was found in the Netherlands and restored by the Nederlands Filmmuseum and the Haghefilm Conservation. It turned up among about two thousand rusty film canisters donated by Haarlem's eccentric Dutch collector, Joop van Liempd. It was given its first modern screening in 2005 and has since been aired on Turner Classic Movies.

In the early 2000s, the German film Metropolis (1927), which had been distributed in many different edits over the years, was restored to as close to the original version as possible by reinstating edited footage and using computer technology to repair damaged footage. However, at that point, approximately a quarter of the original film footage was considered lost, according to the Kino Video DVD release of the restored film. On July 1, 2008, Berlin film experts announced that a copy of the film had been discovered in the archives of the film museum Museo del Cine in Buenos Aires, Argentina, which contained almost all of the scenes still missing from the 2002 restoration. The film now has been restored very close to its premiere version. The restoration process is featured in the documentary Metropolis Refundada.

In 2010, digital copies of ten early American films were presented to the Library of Congress by the Boris Yeltsin Presidential Library, the first film installment from the Russian state archives to be repatriated.

In 2018, the rediscovered 1898 film Something Good – Negro Kiss was inducted into the National Film Registry. Its portrayal of a warm, loving Black couple stands in stark contrast to the typically racist portrayals of that era.

Sometimes, a film believed lost in its original state has been restored, either through the process of colorization or other restoration methods. "The Cage," the original 1964 pilot film for Star Trek, survived only in a black-and-white print until 1987, when a film archivist found an unmarked (mute) 35 mm reel in a Hollywood film laboratory with the negative trims of the unused scenes.

== Stock footage ==
Several films that would otherwise be entirely lost partially survive as stock footage used for later films.

For example, the Universal Pictures short Boo! (1932) contains the only remaining footage of the Universal feature film The Cat Creeps (1930). However, UCLA still has a copy of the soundtrack. The James Cagney film Winner Take All (1932) used scenes from the early talkie Queen of the Night Clubs (1929), starring Texas Guinan; that footage is all that remains of the earlier film, and the follies show sequence from the 1932 film The Tenderfoot starring Joe E. Brown is all that remains of the 1930 First National Pictures film Lilies of the Field, which originally was the mechanical ballet sequence.

Actress-turned-gossip columnist Hedda Hopper made her screen debut in the Fox film The Battle of Hearts (1916). Twenty-six years later, in 1942, Hopper produced her short series "Hedda Hopper's Hollywood #2". In the short, Hopper, William Farnum (the film's star), her son William Hopper, and William Hopper's wife Jane Gilbert view brief portions of The Battle of Hearts. More than likely, Hopper had an entire print of the movie in 1942. However, like many early Fox films, The Battle of Hearts is now lost or missing.

One of the best-known of Charlie Chaplin's works, the silent film The Gold Rush (1925), was re-released in 1942 to include a musical track and narration by Chaplin himself. The reissue would end up having the unintentional result of preserving the film, as the original film (though generally not considered a lost film) shows noticeable degradation of image and missing frames, damage not evident in the 1942 version.

The Polish film O czym się nie mówi (1939) contains three short fragments of Arabella (1917), one of the early films of Pola Negri that was later lost.

== In film and television ==
Several films have been made with lost film fragments incorporated into the work. Decasia (2002) used nothing but decaying film footage as an abstract tone poem of light and darkness, much like the more historical Lyrical Nitrate (Peter Delpeut, 1991) which contained only footage from canisters found stored in an Amsterdam cinema. In 1993, Delpeut released The Forbidden Quest, combining early film footage and archival photographs with new material to tell the fictional story of an ill-fated Antarctic expedition.

The 2016 documentary Dawson City: Frozen Time, about the history of Dawson City, Canada, and the 1978 discovery of previously lost silent films there, incorporates parts of many of those films.

The mockumentary Forgotten Silver, made by Peter Jackson, purports to show recovered footage of early films. Instead, the filmmakers used newly shot film sequences to look like lost films.

In the double feature Grindhouse (2007), both segments—Planet Terror (directed by Robert Rodriguez) and Death Proof (directed by Quentin Tarantino)—have references to missing reels, used as plot devices.

"Cigarette Burns", an episode of the horror anthology series Masters of Horror directed by John Carpenter, deals with the search for a fictional lost film, "La Fin Absolue Du Monde" ("The Absolute End of The World").

== See also ==
- BBC Archives § Archive Treasure Hunt
- Digital permanence
- Doctor Who missing episodes
- Found film
- List of missing treasures
- List of unpublished books
- Lost media
- Preservation (library and archival science)
