= Joseph O'Conor =

Anglo-Irish actor and playwright (1916–2001)

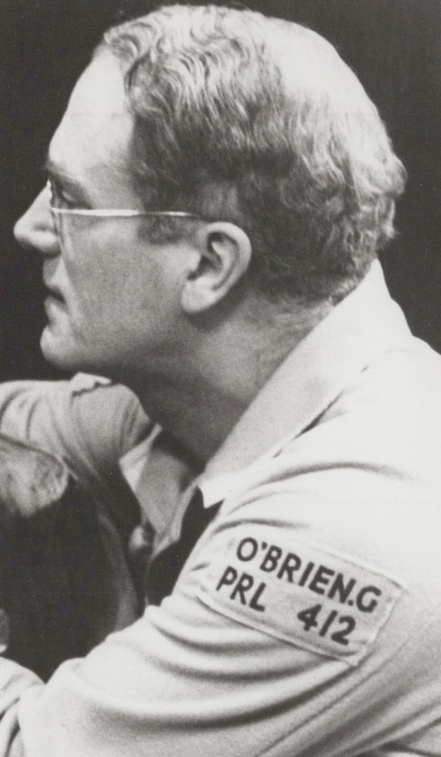
- O'Conor as O'Brien in a 1965 Theatre 625 production of Nineteen Eighty-Four
- Born: 14 February 1916; Dublin, Ireland
- Died: 21 January 2001 (aged 84); London, England
- Occupation: Actor
- Years active: 1947–2001
- Spouses: Naita Moore (m. 1939; died 1977) Lizann Rodger (m. 1979)
- Children: 4

Joseph O'Conor (14 February 1916 – 21 January 2001) was an Irish actor and playwright.

== Early years ==
O'Conor was born in Dublin on 14 February 1916, the son of Frances (née Call) and Daniel O'Conor. His family moved to London, where he attended the Cardinal Vaughan Memorial School, the University of London and RADA. He made his professional stage debut in 1939 playing Flavius, Trebonius, and Titinius in a modern-dress production of Julius Caesar at the Embassy Theatre, and subsequently at His Majesty's Theatre. Also in 1939 he married Naita Moore; they had two children.

== After the war ==
Returning to the stage in 1946, he played a wide variety of roles in London, but with an emphasis on Shakespeare. He spent a season under Donald Wolfit at the Bedford, Camden Town, alternating Iago and Othello with him in Othello (1949) and taking the title role in Hamlet (1949), with Wolfit as the Gravedigger.

O'Conor had a strong spiritual side which found expression in a series of productions at religious-drama festivals and as Christ in the York Mystery Plays (1951 and 1954). A prohibition on the representation of God or Christ on the public stage still existed in England at that time, so his name for the 1951 production was kept a secret.

Seeking a change from London he played two seasons at the Citizens Theatre in Glasgow where his roles included Benedick in Much Ado About Nothing (1954). This he followed with three seasons (1956–1958) at the Bristol Old Vic. Bristol acted in several Bernard Shaw classics. O'Conor played Higgins in Pygmalion and Undershaft in Major Barbara. There was also a production of his own early play, The Iron Harp, set in his Ireland. O'Conor wrote five others.

He continued his theatre work, including major roles in several productions at the Old Vic, but meanwhile he had been building up his television and film activities. In 1967 he played Old Jolyon Forsyte in the television series The Forsyte Saga and in 1968 Mr Brownlow in the film Oliver!.

He spent a season with the National Theatre under Peter Hall for The Tempest (1974) playing Alonso to John Gielgud's Prospero and, with a frightening sense of moral rectitude, Herr Gabor in Frank Wedekind's Spring Awakening (1974). In a season in Greenwich (1975) under Jonathan Miller, he played the King of France in All's Well That Ends Well. He played the Duke in Measure for Measure, set in Freud's Vienna. In the BBC serial The Barchester Chronicles (1982) he played Bunce.

== Later life ==
Following his wife's death in 1977, he married the much younger actress Lizann Rodger. They had two children. He continued to take part in numerous plays, particularly Shakespeare, in the theatre and for television. In 1982 he took the part of the narrator and the voice of the urSkeks in the puppet film The Dark Crystal.

In the 1990s he appeared in several cinema productions. A highlight was the role of J. C. Sullivan in The Forbidden Quest (1993), directed by Peter Delpeut, which gave O'Conor a role as a polar survivor. His subsequent work included the Bishop of Oxford in the film of Tom & Viv (1994) and Mr. Nancarrow in The Wisdom of Crocodiles (1998).

Today he is remembered chiefly by younger viewers for his appearance as Mr Brownlow in Oliver!

As well as his extensive work as an actor, he also directed, and wrote six plays. He died in London on 21 January 2001.

== Selected filmography ==
- Paul Temple's Triumph (1950) - Inspector Crane
- Stranger at My Door (1950) - Michael Foley
- Gorgo (1961) - Prof. Hendricks
- The Devil-Ship Pirates (1964) - Don Jose Margella (uncredited)
- Crooks in Cloisters (1964) - Father Septimus
- The Gorgon (1964) - Coroner
- The Forsyte Saga (1967) - Old Jolyon
- Oliver! (1968) - Mr. Brownlow
- A Walk with Love and Death (1969) - Pierre of St. Jean
- Anne of the Thousand Days (1969) - Bishop Fisher
- The Possessed – Stepan Verhovensky
- Doomwatch (1972) - Vicar
- Father, Dear Father (1973) - Vicar
- Penny Gold (1973) - Blachford
- Yellow Dog (1973) - Dover
- Lost Hearts (1973) - Mr. Abney
- The Black Windmill (1974) - Sir Edward Julyan
- The Barchester Chronicles (1982) - Bunce
- The Dark Crystal (1982) - Narrator / urSkeks (voice)
- The Forbidden Quest (1993) - J.C. Sullivan
- Tom & Viv (1994) - Bishop of Oxford
- Elizabeth (1998) - Earl of Derby
- The Wisdom of Crocodiles (1998) - Mr. Nancarrow
- The Messenger: The Story of Joan of Arc (1999) - Poitiers' Chief Inquisitor

== Writings ==
- The Iron Harp, 1955 (published by Penguin in Three Irish Plays, 1959)
- Inca, 1961 (play, published by Hutchinson, 1968)
- The Tumble Stone, 1962
- A Lion Trap, 1963 (historical adventure, based on the life of Sir Walter Raleigh, published Hutchinson 1969)
- The Third Picture, 1964
- The Heiress, 1971
- King Canoodlum and the Great Horned Cheese (children's story, published BBC 1979)
