= Lyrical Nitrate =

1991 Dutch collage film

Lyrical Nitrate (Dutch: Lyrisch Nitraat) is a 1991 collage film by Peter Delpeut.

== Summary ==
The film consists of clips from various silent films printed on decaying nitrate film stock, including shorts, documentaries, and travelogues. There is no formal narrative. Delpeut followed the film with 1993's The Forbidden Quest, which also uses found footage; the two were released together on video and DVD.

== Production ==
The films were drawn from the Desmet Collection of the Nederlands Filmmuseum (Eye Filmmuseum), where Delpeut worked as deputy director for a decade. Jean Desmet (1875–1956) was an early Dutch film distributor. After Desmet's death a cache of film prints was discovered in the attic of a theater he owned in Amsterdam, and subsequently added to the museum's collection.

== See also ==
- Decasia, a similar non-narrative, found-footage film.
- The Forbidden Quest, Delpeut's unofficial sequel to Lyrical Nitrate.
- Lost film
