= The Film Foundation =

American non-profit organization

- Founded: 1990
- Founder: Martin Scorsese
- Type: Non-profit organization
- Location: United States
- Website: film-foundation.org

The Film Foundation is a US-based non-profit organization dedicated to film preservation and the exhibition of restored and classic cinema. It was founded by film director Martin Scorsese and several other leading filmmakers in 1990. The foundation raises funds and awareness for film preservation projects and creates educational programs about film. The foundation and its partners have restored more than 900 films.

== Background ==
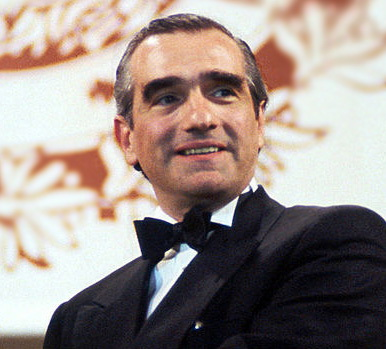
Martin Scorsese in 1995

As of 1997, more than half of all films made before 1950 had been lost, and a mere 10% of those produced in the US prior to 1929 survived. Even films made in Eastmancolor after 1950 were already deteriorating. Because of the risk of deterioration and color fading as films age, Martin Scorsese "began his film preservation crusade in 1980", educating both the industry and the public about the problem.

In 1990, Scorsese created The Film Foundation together with Woody Allen, Robert Altman, Francis Ford Coppola, Clint Eastwood, Stanley Kubrick, George Lucas, Sydney Pollack, Robert Redford and Steven Spielberg, who all sat on the foundation's original board of directors. In 2006, Paul Thomas Anderson, Wes Anderson, Curtis Hanson, Peter Jackson, Ang Lee and Alexander Payne joined the foundation. In 2015, Christopher Nolan also joined the board.

== Description ==
The foundation has been called "the leading organization devoted to fundraising, increasing awareness of preservation, and issuing grants to safeguard this country's cinematic heritage." It aids in preserving movie history by providing support for preservation projects at film archives. Since its inception, the foundation has helped save more than 600 movies. The foundation seeks to promote the exhibition (as well as preservation) of classic cinema. Since 2002, the foundation has been affiliated with the Directors Guild of America, working out of the Guild's offices in New York and Los Angeles and sharing two officers who also sit on the foundation's board.

The foundation also creates educational programs such as "The Story of Movies", a free interdisciplinary curriculum that the foundation has distributed to millions of students and tens of thousands of classrooms. It teaches about the cultural significance of film and the importance of preservation. The curriculum "is intended to teach kids to think critically about what they see in film, and to consider the filmmaking process and decisions made along the way. It also helps students place films in a historical context, using them as a springboard for conversations about social issues."

The Academy Film Archive houses The Film Foundation Collection. The collection consists primarily of newly struck prints on nearly 100 titles. The Film Foundation, UNESCO, and the Fédération Panafricaine des Cinéastes (FEPACI) jointly run The African Film Heritage Project, which preserves culturally significant movies made in Africa and allows Africans to see those movies, as many of them received only limited distribution on their home continent. The project was formally begun in June 2017.

By 2021, the foundation and its partners had restored more than 900 films. The Film Foundation Restoration Screening Room launched May 9, 2022, with the presentation of the 1945 film I Know Where I'm Going! Film screenings run on the second Monday of each month and feature introductions and post-screening conversations about the importance of the films.

== Sources ==
- Slide, Anthony (2000) [1992]. Nitrate Won't Wait: A History of Film Preservation in the United States. Jefferson, North Carolina: McFarland & Company. ISBN 978-0-786-40836-8.

== See also ==
- World Cinema Project
- A Personal Journey with Martin Scorsese Through American Movies
- Cinephilia
