= Felice...Felice... =

1998 film

- Theatrical release poster
- Directed by: Peter Delpeut
- Written by: Peter Delpeut
- Produced by: Pieter van Huystee; Suzanne van Voorst
- Starring: Kumi Nakamura; Johan Leysen
- Cinematography: Walther Vanden Ende
- Edited by: Menno Boerema
- Music by: Loek Dikker
- Distributed by: NFM Distribution
- Release date: 5 February 1998
- Running time: 99 minutes
- Country: Netherlands
- Language: Dutch

Felice...Felice... is a 1998 Dutch drama film directed by Peter Delpeut and was based on the photographs of Felice Beato. The film won the Golden Calves for Best Feature Film and Best Actor (Johan Leysen).

== Plot ==
At the end of the 19th century, a photographer returns to Japan to find out his wife has vanished.

== Cast ==
- Johan Leysen... Felice Beato
- Toshie Ogura ... Ume
- Rina Yasami ... O-Take
- Noriko Sasaki ... Hana
- Yoshi Oïda ... Matsukichi
- Keiko Miyamoto ... Innkeeper
- Yoshi Ota ... Ueno
- Noriko Proett ... O-Koma
- Rika Okemoto ... O-Tae
- Megumi Shimanuki ... Kimiyo
- Kumi Nakamura ... O-Kiku
- Kyomi Yui ... Model
- Peter Kho Sin Kie ... Man in rain
- Daichi Taneko ... Playing boy
- Machiko Okemoto ... Playing boy
