= Dolly Dearest =

- Theatrical release poster
- Directed by: Maria Lease
- Written by: Maria Lease; Rod Nave; Peter Sutcliffe (story); Maria Lease (screenplay)
- Produced by: Daniel Cady
- Starring: Denise Crosby; Sam Bottoms; Rip Torn
- Cinematography: Eric D. Anderson
- Edited by: Geoffrey Rowland
- Music by: Mark Snow
- Production companies: Patriot Pictures; Channeler Enterprises
- Distributed by: Trimark Pictures; Image Organization
- Release date: October 18, 1991
- Running time: 94 minutes
- Country: United States
- Languages: English; Spanish

Dolly Dearest is a 1991 American supernatural horror film directed by Maria Lease starring Denise Crosby, Rip Torn, Sam Bottoms, Chris Demetral, Candace Hutson and Lupe Ontiveros. The film was initially supposed to be direct-to-video, but it did get a limited theatrical release in the Midwestern United States.

== Plot ==
Elliot Wade obtains ownership of the Dolly Dearest factory in Mexico. Not far from the factory is the underground Mayan tomb of Sanzia, or Satan on Earth. An archaeologist breaks into the sarcophagus, accidentally releasing the spirit of the ancient devil child Sanzia, dying in the process. Sanzia takes refuge in the porcelain doll, Dolly Dearest.

The Wade family travels to Mexico to see their new home, where they meet their realtor, Mr. Estrella, and housekeeper, Camilla. The factory, long abandoned, is structurally unstable, upsetting Elliot. Jessica discovers many well-preserved dolls on a shelf and her father allows her to take one: Dolly Dearest. Jimmy finds the entrance to the cave, but his father warns him to never go there.

The next day, the children's mother, Marilyn, finds a disturbing drawing she thinks Jessica drew. Jessica becomes progressively more violent and obsessed with Dolly. She acts normal when her father is around, but exhibits evil behavior around her mother. Camilla believes the doll is controlling Jessica. When Jessica speaks in Sanzian tongue, Camilla tries to warn Marilyn, but is killed by the spirit. Jimmy sneaks out one night and breaks into the factory. He finds the night watchman, Luis, dead and flees.

Marilyn realizes her daughter may truly be possessed and tries to take the doll. Sanzia momentarily possesses Jessica and yells, "I will kill you! The kid's mine." The next day, Marilyn talks with archaeologist Resnick (Rip Torn) about their dig. Resnick explains they are searching for the remains of the Sanzia devil child inside the tomb. The devil child, a force of evil, fed on the warm blood of children. The tribe killed the creature because its dietary needs almost wiped out the tribe's population. Marilyn reveals that Jessica is being controlled by her doll.

At home, Marilyn finds Jimmy hiding; he reveals that he saw Dolly talk and move. Marilyn gets their shotgun and tells Jimmy to call his father. At the factory, the dolls disconnect the phones. Marilyn returns to Jessica's room to find the doll gone. Jimmy can't get through to Elliot so he attempts to call the operator but is unable to communicate because he does not speak Spanish. When Jessica becomes separated from Dolly, her mother attempts to flee with her, only to be blocked by Dolly. Dolly calls to Jessica, who then attacks her mother as Dolly advances with a kitchen knife. Jimmy fires the shotgun at Dolly, releasing the doll's hold on Jessica.

Marilyn, Jessica and Jimmy drive to the factory, where Elliot is being attacked by the dolls. Meanwhile, the professor enters the tomb and sees the remains of the devil child, which has the body of an infant and the head of a goat. Realizing the myth was true, he runs to the factory, where he saves Elliot from the dolls. The family reunites and plants dynamite around the factory. It blows up, along with the dolls, and a demonic scream is heard, implying Sanzia is destroyed. The family watches the blazing factory burn to the ground with the dolls trapped inside.

== Cast ==
- Denise Crosby as Marilyn Wade, Elliot's wife and Jessica and Jimmy's mother. She is the protagonist.
- Sam Bottoms as Elliot Wade, Marilyn's husband, Jessica and Jimmy's father, and the toy maker and manufacturer of the "Dolly Dearest" toy factory.
- Rip Torn as Karl Resnick, an archaeologist who is trying to find the remains of the Sanzia Devil child.
- Lupe Ontiveros as Camilla, the housekeeper. She is later killed by Dolly.
- Candace Hutson as Jessica "Jessie" Wade, Elliot and Marilyn's daughter and Jimmy's younger sister. (Credited as Candy Hutson)
- Chris Demetral as Jimmy Wade, Jessica's older brother.
- Ed Gale as the Dolly double. Serves as the film's antagonist.

== Release ==
=== Home media ===
Dolly Dearest was released on DVD in the United States via Lionsgate Home Entertainment on September 20, 2005 which is available only in a 1.33:1 (4:3) aspect ratio, while the only special feature is a trailer.

In March 2020, it was announced that the film will be released on Blu-ray via Vinegar Syndrome on May 26, 2020. The new remaster will contain a new 2K restoration, special features including interviews from actors Denise Crosby and Ed Gale, reversible cover art, original aspect ratio (1.85:1) and SDH English subtitles.

== Reception ==
=== Critical response ===
Critical reception for Dolly Dearest was mostly panned, with DVD Verdict writing that "aside from a handful of fun moments, there's nothing much here to separate it from the lineup of Child's Play clones it dwells among." Variety praised Hutson's performance but criticized the movie's "klutzy dialogue". DVD Talk panned the film, saying "in the 'killer doll' subgenre of stupid horror flicks, Dolly Dearest may very well be the most moronic". The Austin Chronicle also reviewed the movie, giving Dolly Dearest 2.5 out of 5 stars.
