= Diva Dolorosa =

1999 comedy film

- Directed by: Peter Delpeut
- Screenplay by: Peter Delpeut
- Produced by: Frank Roumen
- Starring: Francesca Bertini; Pina Menichelli; Lyda Borelli
- Edited by: Menno Boerema
- Music by: Loek Dikker
- Release date: 1999

Diva Dolorosa is a 1999 Dutch experimental documentary film directed by Peter Delpeut. It premiered at the 56th Venice International Film Festival.

== Premise ==
The film is a compilation of excerpts from 12 French and Italian silent films made between 1913 and 1920, with an orchestral score by Loek Dikker tying them together.

== Release ==
The film had its world premiere at the 56th edition of the Venice Film Festival, in the New Territories section.

== Reception ==
DVD Talk's critic Jamie S. Rich praised the film, noting "the heavy emotion of the subject, as well as the use of music to drive the story along, retains the awesome power of the images without altering them to fit a greater agenda". Michael S. Gant from Metro described it as 'a kind of "ur-diva" film', and wrote "Diva Dolorosa fills you with the desire to experience more of the riches of this bygone and unknown film era".
