= Candace Hutson =

American actress

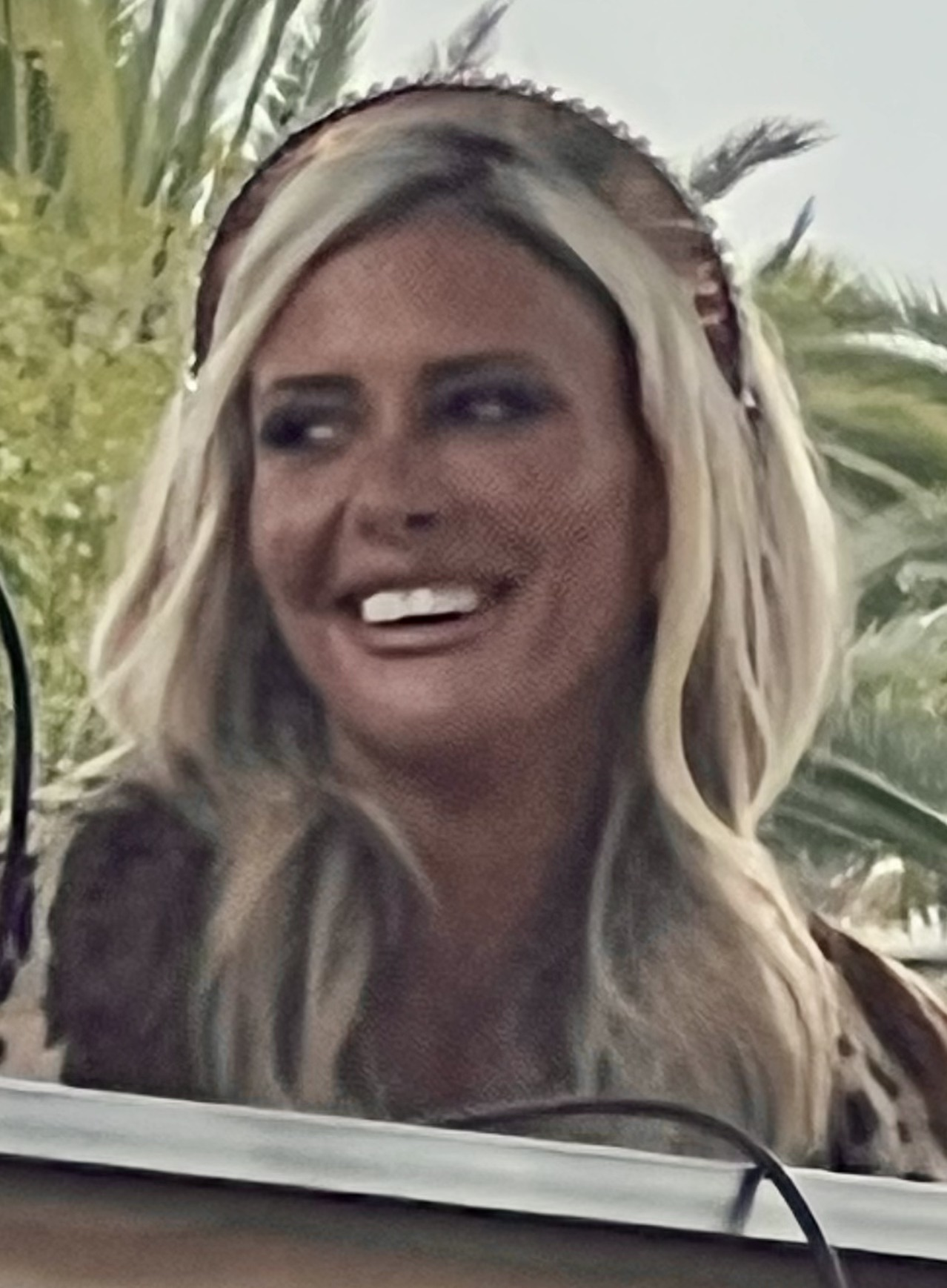
- Hutson in 2026
- Occupations: Actress, voice actress

Candace Hutson (born May 3, 1980) is a former American actress and a voice actress. She voiced Cera in The Land Before Time (1988) as the longest-remaining original cast member, reprising the role in the first three sequels, also she played Jessie Wade in Dolly Dearest (1991) and Molly Newton in Evening Shade (1991–1994).

She attended the University of Tulsa and acted with the Gaslight Dinner Theater in Tulsa and in some of that troupe's touring productions. She left Tulsa to go to New York, where she was an elevator operator at the Danceteria club and was a rock music singer.

== Filmography ==
=== Film ===
Year	Title	Role	Notes
1988	The Land Before Time	Cera	
1989	Hider in the House	Holly Dreyer	
1991	Dolly Dearest	Jessica Wade	
1994	The Land Before Time II: The Great Valley Adventure	Cera	
1995	The Maddening	Jill Scudder	
1995	The Land Before Time III: The Time of the Great Giving	Cera	
1996	The Land Before Time IV: Journey Through the Mists	Cera	

=== Television ===
Year	Title	Role	Notes
1987	Full House	Becky	Episode: "The First Day of School" (credited as Candy Hutson)
1988	The New Leave It to Beaver	Darla	Episode: "Madcap Dreams"
1989	Married... with Children	Tina	Episode: "Life's a Beach"
1990	Baywatch	Little Girl	Episode: "Armored Car"
1990	Hunter	Robin Hawkins	2 episodes
1990	Newhart	Baby Stephanie	Episode: "The Last Newhart"
1990	Empty Nest	Cindy	Episode: "The Boy Next Door"
1990–1991	The Hogan Family	Sally Gordon	2 episodes
1991	Quantum Leap	Kimberly Ellroy	Episode: "Nuclear Family"
1991–1994	Evening Shade	Molly Newton	75 episodes
1993	Against the Grain	Faye	Episode: "Pilot"
