= Étienne Perruchon =

French composer (1958–2019)

Étienne Perruchon (23 October 1958, Suresnes – 14 May 2019) was a French composer, known mainly for his film scores. Perruchon is also particularly known for the "Dogorian Musics" illustrating the world of Dogora, an imaginary country in Central Europe (film Dogora: Ouvrons les yeux).

He died on May 14, 2019, at the age of 61.

== Some works ==
- French Fried Vacation 3
- Dogora: Ouvrons les yeux
- Tchikidan.
- Skaanza.
- Voir la mer
- Beauties at War
- The Suicide Shop
