= Dogora: Ouvrons les yeux =

- Theatrical release poster
- Directed by: Patrice Leconte
- Produced by: Frédéric Brillion; Gilles Legrand
- Cinematography: Jean-Marie Dreujou
- Edited by: Joëlle Hache
- Music by: Étienne Perruchon
- Production companies: Epithète Films; Zoulou Films; TF1 International
- Distributed by: Warner Bros. Pictures
- Release date: 10 November 2004
- Running time: 80 minutes
- Country: France

Dogora: Ouvrons les yeux ("Dogora: Open our eyes") is a documentary film directed by Patrice Leconte, released in 2004. The film has no narration and focuses on everyday life in Cambodia.
