= Loek Dikker =

Dutch musician and composer

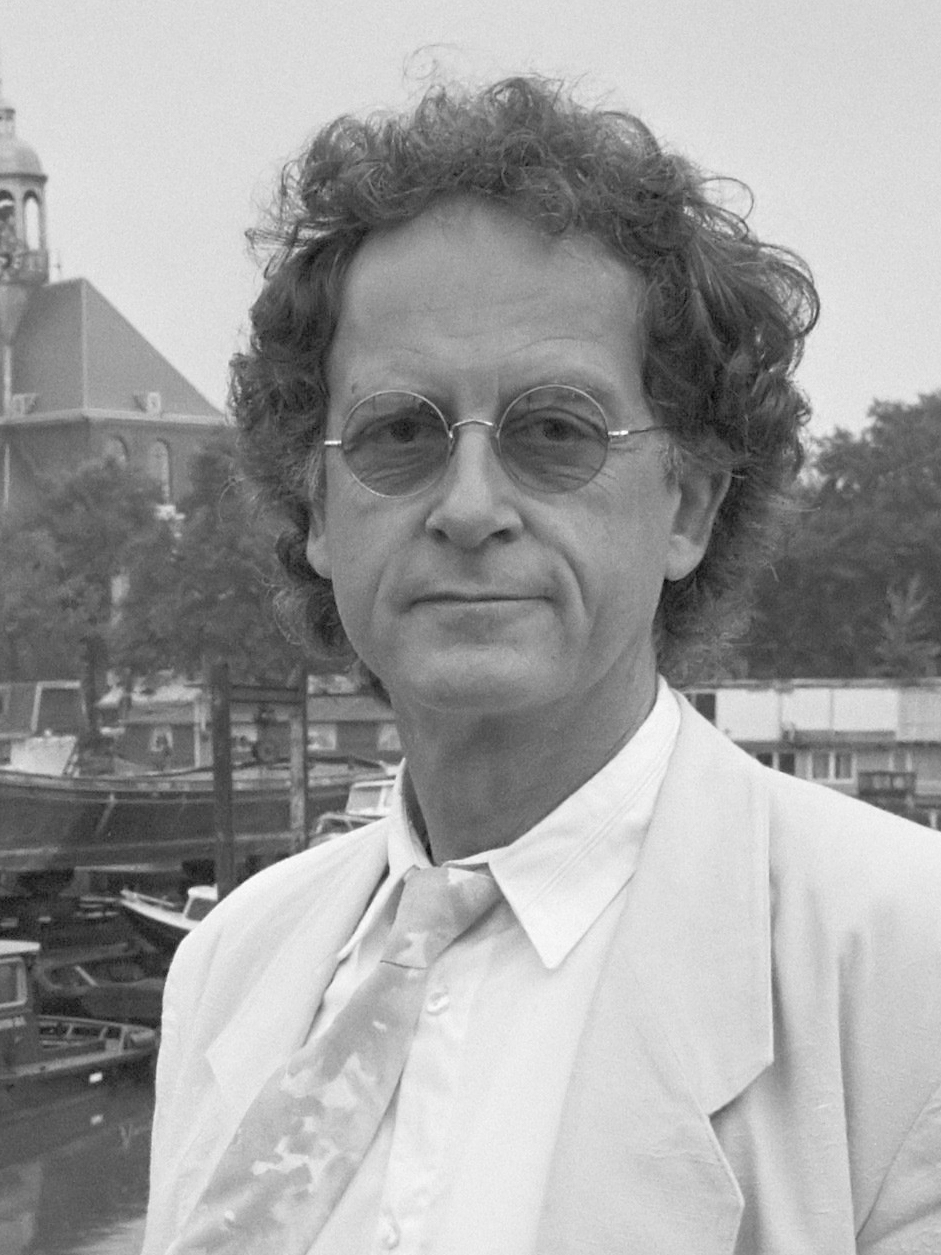
- Loek Dikker in 1989

Background information
- Born: 28 February 1944 (age 82); Amsterdam, Netherlands
- Genres: jazz, classical music
- Occupations: conductor, composer, instrumentalist
- Years active: 1959–present
- Formerly of: Loek Dikker Waterland Ensemble
- Website: www.loekdikker.com

Loek Dikker (born 28 February 1944) is a Dutch pianist, conductor, and composer. Dikker is known for his scores for the films The Fourth Man, Body Parts, and Rosenstraße, among others.

== Biography ==
After training as a classical pianist, Dikker became a jazz musician after seeing a 1959 televised performance by Horace Silver and Sonny Rollins. He gave his first jazz performance in 1960, in a jazz and poetry concert with Godfried Bomans. He later performed in the bands of Hans Dulfer and Theo Loevendie, and with American instrumentalists Oliver Nelson, Cannonball Adderley, and Don Byas. In the mid-1970s, he founded his Waterland Ensemble. He wrote his first film score in 1981, and has scored over sixty films.

Dikker is the founder and chairman of Muziekinstituut MultiMedia, an organization founded in 2006 to promote and encourage collaboration among multimedia composers. He is also a board member of FFACE, the Federation of Film and Audiovisual Composers of Europe.

Dikker's sister, Marianne Dikker, is a screenwriter and director.

== Filmography (as composer) ==
- Two Queens and One Consort (1981)
- The Fourth Man (1983)
- Peaceful Days (1984)
- De droomproducenten (1984) – documentary
- Het bittere kruid (1985)
- Passage: A Richard Erdman Sculpture (1985) – documentary
- Slow Burn (1986) – television movie
- Iris (1987)
- Pascali's Island (1988)
- Een scherzo furioso (1990)
- Dilemma (1990)
- Body Parts (1991)
- Nie wieder schlafen (1992)
- The Forbidden Quest (1993)
- Prinzenbad (1993)
- De tussentijd (1993)
- The Babysitter (1995)
- The Commissioner (1998)
- The Escape (1998) – television movie
- Kinderland ist abgebrannt (1998) – documentary
- Felice...Felice... (1998)
- Diva Dolorosa (1999) – documentary
- Führer Ex (2002)
- Science Fiction (2002)
- Rosenstraße (2003)
- Giacomo Casanova (2004) – television movie
- Wolfsbergen (2004)
- Der junge Beethoven (2007)

== Musical recordings ==
=== Jazz ===
- Love Cry and Super Nimbus (1970)
- Tan Tango (1975)
- Domesticated Doomsday (1978)
- The Waterland Big Band Is hot! Part 1 / Part 2 (1979)
- Mayhem in our Streets (1980)
- Summer Suite (1982)

=== Classical ===
- To Paul Desmond (1991)
- Overijssels Volkslied (2000)
- South Side Ground Zero Boogie Blues (2004)

== Awards ==
- 1983: Silver Desk for Best Dutch film music, for The Fourth Man
- 1990: Golden Calf, for his body of work from 1985–1990
- 1991: Saturn Award for Best Music, for Body Parts
- 2004: Ravello Cinemusica (Italy), for Best European film music, for Rosenstraße
