= Peter Delpeut =

Dutch filmmaker and writer

Peter Delpeut (born 12 July 1956, Vianen) is a Dutch filmmaker and writer. Several of his films have heavily used found footage. He has won several literary awards for his writing.

== Partial filmography ==
- Lyrical Nitrate (1990)
- The Forbidden Quest (1992)
- Cinéma Perdu (1995)
- Felice...Felice... (1998)
- Diva Dolorosa (1999)
- In Loving Memory (2001)
- Go West, Young Man! (2003)
- Immer Fernweh (2011) – short documentary about the German painter Johanna Keizer
