= Shelley Duvall filmography =

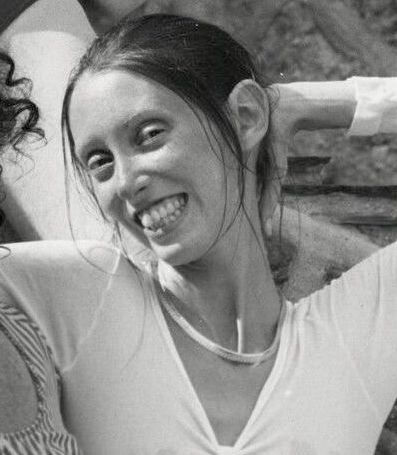
Duvall photographed in Los Angeles, 1975

Shelley Duvall was an American actress who began her career in 1970, appearing in Robert Altman's Brewster McCloud. She went on to have roles in numerous films by Altman throughout the 1970s, including the period Western film McCabe & Mrs. Miller (1971), the crime drama Thieves Like Us (1974), the ensemble musical comedy Nashville (1975), and the Western Buffalo Bill and the Indians, or Sitting Bull's History Lesson (1976). Duvall also had a minor role in Woody Allen's Annie Hall (1977). Her performance in Altman's subsequent psychological thriller 3 Women (1977) won her the Best Actress Award at the 1977 Cannes Film Festival, a Los Angeles Film Critics Association Award, as well as a BAFTA Award nomination in the same category.

In 1980, Duvall starred as Wendy Torrance in Stanley Kubrick's The Shining, an adaptation of the Stephen King novel of the same name. She subsequently starred as Olive Oyl in Altman's musical Popeye (1980), followed by a lead role in Terry Gilliam's fantasy film Time Bandits (1981). She had a main role in the Tim Burton short Frankenweenie (1984), followed by a supporting role in the comedy Roxanne (1987). Much of the late 1980s saw Duvall working as a producer and television host in children's programming, with her Faerie Tale Theatre (1982–1987) and Tall Tales & Legends (1985–1987).

She continued to appear in film through the 1990s, with supporting parts in Steven Soderbergh's thriller The Underneath (1995), and the Henry James adaptation The Portrait of a Lady (1996), directed by Jane Campion. She also appeared in the children's film Casper Meets Wendy, and the supernatural horror film Tale of the Mummy (both 1998). Duvall's last performance prior to her hiatus was in the independent feature Manna from Heaven (2002). After a 21 year absence, Duvall returned to acting in the horror film The Forest Hills (2023), which would be her final film role before her death on July 11, 2024.

== Film ==
Year	Title	Role	Notes	Ref.
1970	Brewster McCloud	Suzanne Davis		
1971	McCabe & Mrs. Miller	Ida Coyle		
1974	Thieves Like Us	Keechie		
1975	Nashville	Martha / L.A. Joan		
1976	Buffalo Bill and the Indians, or Sitting Bull's History Lesson	Mrs. Grover Cleveland		
1977	3 Women	Mildred "Millie" Lammoreaux		
1977	Annie Hall	Pam		
1980	The Shining	Wendy Torrance		
1980	Popeye	Olive Oyl		
1981	Time Bandits	Pansy		
1984	Frankenweenie	Susan Frankenstein	Short film	
1987	Roxanne	Dixie		
1991	Suburban Commando	Jenny Wilcox		
1995	The Underneath	Nurse		
1996	The Portrait of a Lady	Countess Gemini		
1997	Changing Habits	Sister Agatha		
1997	Twilight of the Ice Nymphs	Amelia Glahn		
1997	Shadow Zone: My Teacher Ate My Homework	Mrs. Fink		
1997	RocketMan	Mrs. Randall	Uncredited	
1998	Tale of the Mummy	Edith Butros		
1998	Casper Meets Wendy	Gabby		
1998	Home Fries	Mrs. Jackson		
1999	The 4th Floor	Martha Stewart		
1999	Boltneck	Mrs. Stein		
2000	Dreams in the Attic	Nellie	Unreleased	
2002	Manna from Heaven	Detective Dubrinski		
2023	The Forest Hills	Mama	Final film role	

== Television ==
Year	Title	Role	Notes	Ref.
1973	Cannon	Liz Christie	Episode: "The Seventh Grave"	
1973	Love, American Style	Bonnie Lee	Episode: "Love and the Mr. and Mrs.	
1976	Baretta	Aggie	Episode: "Aggie"	
1976	Bernice Bobs Her Hair	Bernice	Television film	
1977	Saturday Night Live	Herself (host) / Various roles	Episode: "Shelley Duvall/Joan Armatrading"	
1982–1987	Faerie Tale Theatre	Herself (host) / Various roles	27 episodes; also creator and executive producer	
1984	Booker	Laura Burroughs	Short film	
1985–1987	Tall Tales & Legends	Herself (host) / Various roles	9 episodes; also creator and executive producer	
1986	Popples	—N/a	Television film; executive producer	
1986	The Twilight Zone	Margaret	Episode: "A Saucer of Loneliness"	
1987	Frog	Annie Anderson	Television film; also executive producer	
1989	Nightmare Classics	—N/a	Creator and executive producer	
1990	Mother Goose Rock 'n' Rhyme	Little Bo Peep	Television film	
1990	Rockin' Through the Decades	Herself	Television special	
1991	Frogs!	Annie Anderson	Television film	
1991	Stories from Growing up	—N/a	Television film; executive producer	
1991	Backfield in Motion	—N/a	Television film; executive producer	
1992	The Ray Bradbury Theater	Leota Bean	Episode: "The Tombstone"	
1992–1993	Shelley Duvall's Bedtime Stories	Herself (host)	14 episodes; also creator, writer and executive producer	
1993	Roseanne	Herself	Episode: "Halloween V"	
1994	Mrs. Piggle-Wiggle	—N/a	Creator and executive producer	
1994	L.A. Law	Margo Stanton	Episode: "Tunnel of Love"	
1995	Frasier	Caroline (voice)	Episode: "Dark Victory"	
1997	The Adventures of Shirley Holmes	Alicia Fett	Episode: "The Case of the Wannabe Witch"	
1997	Adventures from the Book of Virtues	Fairy (voice)	Episode: "Perseverance"	
1997	Aaahh!!! Real Monsters	Ocka (voice)	Episode: "Oblina Without a Cause"	
1997	Alone	Estelle	Television film	
1998	Maggie Winters	Muriel	Episode: "Dinner at Rachel's"	
1999	Wishbone	Renee Lassiter	Episode: "Groomed for Greatness"	
1999	The Hughleys	Mrs. Crump	Episode: "Storm o' the Century"	
