= Universal Animation Studios =

American animation studio

Universal Animation Studios LLC
- Logo used since 2006
- Formerly: Universal Cartoon Studios (1990–2005)
- Type: Division
- Industry: Animation
- Predecessor: Studio: Walter Lantz Productions; Library: Sullivan Bluth Studios; Amblimation
- Founded: 1990; 36 years ago
- Founder: Jeff Segal
- Headquarters: 111 Universal Hollywood Drive, Universal City, California, U.S.; 1000 Flower Street, Glendale, California, U.S.
- Number of locations: 2
- Key people: Ellen Cockrill (SVP, Animation Production at Universal 1440); Lisa Melbye (VP, Animation Production at Universal 1440); Margie Cohn (head of Universal animated TV properties at DreamWorks)
- Products: Animated films Animated television shows
- Parent: Universal 1440 Entertainment
- Website: uphe.com

Universal Animation Studios LLC, formerly known as Universal Cartoon Studios, is an American animation studio and a unit of Universal 1440 Entertainment, a home entertainment division of Universal Pictures Home Entertainment, which in turn is owned by NBCUniversal, the entertainment and mass media division of Comcast. It has produced direct-to-video sequels to Universal-released feature films, such as An American Tail (1986), The Land Before Time (1988), Balto (1995), and Curious George (2006), as well as other films and television series. This studio rarely made theatrically-released films, focusing instead on direct-to-video/streaming films and TV shows.

The actual animation production is mostly done overseas, usually by foreign animation studios such as AKOM, Wang Film Productions (now known as Brilliant Animation Studios), and Rough Draft Studios, while pre-production and post-production are United States–based. On August 23, 2016, after Universal completed its acquisition of DreamWorks Animation, the division was merged with DreamWorks Animation Television, which began producing a majority of Universal Pictures' family-friendly TV shows. The studio is one of Comcast's three animation studios, alongside DreamWorks Animation and Illumination.

== History ==
Universal Animation Studios was established in 1990 as Universal Cartoon Studios, the animation division of MCA Inc., to produce television shows. It was originally a subsidiary of Universal Family Entertainment, which was headed by former Hanna-Barbera employee Jeff Segal. Its debut work was Back to the Future: The Animated Series, which was announced on March 22, 1991, and premiered on CBS on September 14 the same year.

In 1993, Universal Cartoon Studios was transferred as a joint-venture between Universal Family Entertainment and MCA/Universal Home Video, due to the tremendous growth in the children's home video market.

In 1995, the company partnered with Harvey Comics to launch a new subsidiary, Universal/Harvey Animation Studios, to produce animated series based on Harvey Comics' properties.

In 1996, the two groups Universal Family Entertainment and its subsidiary Universal Cartoon Studios were absorbed into MCA Television Entertainment.

In 1998, Universal Cartoon Studios was later transferred to Universal Family & Home Entertainment Production (later renamed as Universal Home Entertainment Productions), as first mentioned in An American Tail: The Treasure of Manhattan Island.

In 2001, when Vivendi acquired Universal Cartoon Studios and Universal Pictures Home Video's parent Universal Studios alongside its owner Seagram back in 2000, Universal Studios established a new subsidiary that would handle, manage and expand Universal Pictures' key intellectual properties across multiple platforms entitled Universal Pictures Franchise Development with Universal Cartoon Studios and its home entertainment parent Universal Pictures Home Video & London-based British production division Universal Pictures Visual Programming being placed into the new subsidiary alongside Universal Studios' consumer products & licensing division Universal Pictures Consumer Products which also became division of the new subsidiary, while Louis Feola became president of the new subsidiary.

In 2005, Universal Cartoon Studios was absorbed into Universal Studios Family Productions, and later on, it was renamed to Universal Animation Studios.

In 2006, Universal Animation Studios produced and animated the film Curious George in-house in Los Angeles, along with several animation studios around the world.

In 2007, Chris Meledandri founded Illumination (formerly as unnamed until 2008) with a deal was announced positioning his studio as Universal's family entertainment arm, that would produce one to two films a year starting in 2010, while Universal Studios Family Productions acts as Universal Animation Studios' animation home-video arm. As part of the deal, Illumination retains creative control and Universal Pictures exclusively distributes the films.

In 2016, Universal Pictures acquired DreamWorks Animation, making it one of the two theatrical animation divisions of Universal, alongside Illumination. With this acquisition, it was merged with DreamWorks Animation Television, who began to produce shows based on Universal Pictures franchises, such as Fast & Furious: Spy Racers and Jurassic World: Camp Cretaceous.

== Franchises ==
This is not including the original films of An American Tail, The Land Before Time and Balto made by either Hanna-Barbera (formerly), Sullivan Bluth Studios or Amblimation.

Titles	Release dates	Movies	TV Seasons
Woody Woodpecker	1991–present^{(Note: The date reflects the first appearance of Woody Woodpecker in a production from Universal Cartoon Studios rather than the date when the character was originally created in 1940 by Walter Lantz Productions)}	2	6
An American Tail	1986–2000	4	1
The Land Before Time	1988–2016	14	1
Balto	1995–2004	3	0
Alvin and the Chipmunks	1999–2000	2	0
Curious George	2006–2022	6	15

== Filmography ==
=== Feature films ===
==== Theatrical feature films ====
No.	Title	Release date	Director	Writer(s)		Producer(s)	Co-production with
No.	Title	Release date	Director	Story	Screenplay	Producer(s)	Co-production with
1	Curious George	February 10, 2006	Matthew O'Callaghan	Ken Kaufman; Mike Werb	Ken Kaufman	Ron Howard; David Kirschner; Jon Shapiro	Imagine Entertainment
2	Woody Woodpecker^{[R]}^{[S]}	October 5, 2017	Alex Zamm	William Robertson; Alex Zamm; Daniel Altiere; Steven Altiere	William Robertson; Alex Zamm	Mike Elliott	Universal 1440 Entertainment

^{S} Combines live-action with animation.
^{R} Not released theatrically in the United States

==== Direct-to-video/streaming feature films ====
===== Children's feature films =====
No.	Title	Release date	Co-production with
as Universal Cartoon Studios
1	The Land Before Time II: The Great Valley Adventure	December 13, 1994	N/A
2	The Land Before Time III: The Time of the Great Giving	December 12, 1995	N/A
3	The Land Before Time IV: Journey Through the Mists	December 10, 1996	N/A
4	The Land Before Time V: The Mysterious Island	December 9, 1997	N/A
5	Hercules and Xena – The Animated Movie: The Battle for Mount Olympus	January 6, 1998	Renaissance Pictures
6	The Land Before Time VI: The Secret of Saurus Rock	December 1, 1998	N/A
7	Alvin and the Chipmunks Meet Frankenstein	September 28, 1999	Bagdasarian Productions, LLC.
8	An American Tail: The Treasure of Manhattan Island	February 15, 2000	N/A
9	An American Tail: The Mystery of the Night Monster	July 25, 2000	N/A
10	Alvin and the Chipmunks Meet the Wolfman	August 29, 2000	Bagdasarian Productions, LLC.
11	The Land Before Time VII: The Stone of Cold Fire	December 5, 2000	N/A
12	The Land Before Time VIII: The Big Freeze	December 4, 2001	N/A
13	Balto II: Wolf Quest	February 19, 2002	N/A
14	The Land Before Time IX: Journey to Big Water	December 10, 2002	N/A
15	The Land Before Time X: The Great Longneck Migration	December 2, 2003	N/A
16	Balto III: Wings of Change	September 30, 2004	N/A
17	The Land Before Time XI: Invasion of the Tinysauruses	January 11, 2005	N/A
18	The Adventures of Brer Rabbit	March 21, 2006	N/A
as Universal Animation Studios
19	The Land Before Time XII: The Great Day of the Flyers	February 27, 2007	N/A
20	The Land Before Time XIII: The Wisdom of Friends	November 27, 2007	N/A
21	Curious George 2: Follow That Monkey!^{[R]}	July 10, 2009	Imagine Entertainment
22	The Little Engine That Could	March 22, 2011	Crest Animation Productions
23	Curious George 3: Back to the Jungle	June 23, 2015	Imagine Entertainment; Universal 1440 Entertainment
24	The Land Before Time XIV: Journey of the Brave	February 2, 2016	Universal 1440 Entertainment
25	Mariah Carey's All I Want for Christmas Is You	November 14, 2017	Universal 1440 Entertainment; Splash Entertainment; Telegael; Magic Carpet Productions
26	Curious George: Royal Monkey	September 10, 2019	Imagine Entertainment; Universal 1440 Entertainment
27	Curious George: Go West, Go Wild^{[P]}	September 8, 2020	Imagine Entertainment; Universal 1440 Entertainment
28	Bobbleheads: The Movie	December 8, 2020	Threshold Animation Studios; Universal 1440 Entertainment
29	Curious George: Cape Ahoy^{[P]}	September 30, 2021	Imagine Entertainment; Universal 1440 Entertainment
30	Woody Woodpecker Goes to Camp^{[N]}^{[S]}	April 12, 2024	Universal 1440 Entertainment

===== Adult animated short films =====
No.	Title	Release date	Co-production with
as Universal Cartoon Studios
1	Van Helsing: The London Assignment^{[A]}	May 11, 2004	N/A
2	The Chronicles of Riddick: Dark Fury^{[A]}	June 15, 2004	N/A

^{P} Released on Peacock.
^{N} Released on Netflix.
^{A} Adult animated production.

=== Short films ===
- Fractured Fairy Tales: The Phox, the Box, & the Lox (1999) (theatrical release)

=== Television series ===
No.	Title	Creator(s) / Developer(s)	Original run	Network	Co-production with
as Universal Cartoon Studios
1	Back to the Future	Robert Zemeckis; Bob Gale	1991–1992	CBS	Amblin Television; Zaloom/Mayfield Productions; BIG Pictures
2	Shelley Duvall's Bedtime Stories	Shelley Duvall	1992–1993	Showtime	Think Entertainment
3	Fievel's American Tails	David Kirschner	1992	CBS	Amblin Television; Nelvana
4	Exosquad	Jeff Segal; Eric Lewald; Michael Edens	1993–1994	Syndication	N/A
5	Problem Child	Scott Alexander; Larry Karaszewski	1993–1994	USA Network	D'Ocon Films Productions (season 1); Lacewood Productions (season 2)
6	Monster Force	Marv Wolfman	1994	Syndication	Lacewood Productions
7	Beethoven	N/A	1994–1995	CBS	Northern Lights Entertainment
8	Earthworm Jim	Doug TenNapel; Doug Langdale	1995–1996	Kids' WB	Shiny Entertainment
9	The Savage Dragon	Dean Stefan; Bob Forward	1995–1996	USA Network	Lacewood Productions (season 1); Studio B Productions (season 2); P3 Entertainment; USA Studios
10	The Spooktacular New Adventures of Casper	Sherri Stoner; Deanna Oliver	1996–1998	Fox Kids	Amblin Television; Harveytoons
11	Wing Commander Academy	Michael Edens; Mark Edens	1996	USA Network	USA Studios
12	Vor-Tech: Undercover Conversion Squad	N/A	1996	Syndication	Edition Dupuis France S.A. Mediatoon; Lacewood Productions
13	The New Woody Woodpecker Show	Bob Jaques; Kelly Armstrong	1999–2002	Fox Kids	N/A
14	The Mummy: The Animated Series	Thomas Pugsley; Greg Klein	2001–2003	Kids' WB	Studios USA Television (season 1); The Sommers Company
as Universal Animation Studios
15	Curious George	Joe Fallon	2006–2022	PBS Kids (2006–2022); Family Jr. (2018–2020); Peacock (2020–2022)	Imagine Entertainment (seasons 1–9, 14–15); WGBH Boston (seasons 1–12); Universal 1440 Entertainment (seasons 10–15)
16	The Land Before Time	Ford Riley	2007–2008	Cartoon Network	Amblin Entertainment
17	Woody Woodpecker	Alex Zamm	2018–2022	YouTube	Universal Pictures International; Universal 1440 Entertainment; Splash Entertainment

=== Television specials ===
No.	Title	Release date	Network	Co-production with
as Universal Cartoon Studios
1	A Wish for Wings That Work	December 18, 1991	CBS	Amblin Television
as Universal Animation Studios
2	Curious George: A Very Monkey Christmas	November 25, 2009	PBS Kids	Imagine Entertainment; WGBH Boston
3	Curious George Swings Into Spring	April 22, 2013	PBS Kids	Imagine Entertainment; WGBH Boston
4	Curious George: A Halloween Boo Fest	October 28, 2013	PBS Kids	Imagine Entertainment; WGBH Boston
5	How Murray Saved Christmas	December 5, 2014	NBC	Universal Television

=== Miscellaneous work ===
- 63rd Academy Awards (1991) – animation for Woody Woodpecker presenting the award for Best Animated Short Film
- Kids WB! promos – Earthworm Jim segments.
- Dudley-Do Right’s RipSaw Falls (1999) – traditionally-animated queue video.

=== Cancelled projects ===
- Escape from Jurassic Park, an animated TV series that takes place after the first Jurassic Park film, was confirmed to be in development and awaiting Steven Spielberg's approval in June 1993. The series would have centered on John Hammond's attempts to finish Jurassic Park and open it to the public, while InGen's corporate rival Biosyn is simultaneously planning to open their own dinosaur theme park in Brazil, which ultimately ends with their dinosaurs escaping into the jungles. Artist William Stout was hired to work on the series and subsequently made a trailer to demonstrate how the series would look, and how it would combine traditional animation with computer animation. The series required Spielberg's final approval before it could go into production. However, Spielberg had grown tired of the massive promotion and merchandise revolving around the film, and never watched the trailer. On July 13, 1993, Margaret Loesch, president of the Fox Children's Network, confirmed that discussions had been held with Spielberg about an animated version of the film. Loesch also said, "At least for now and in the foreseeable future, there will not be an animated Jurassic Park. That's Steven Spielberg's decision, and we respect that decision."
- A pair of traditionally animated cutscenes were produced for the 1996 video game Crash Bandicoot to serve as the game's intro and outro, as well as act as source material for a potential animated series if the game was well-received and commercially successful. The hand-drawn cutscenes were dropped after Sony Computer Entertainment picked up Crash Bandicoot for publication, as Sony desired to push the PlayStation's 3D polygonal graphics. The cutscenes were uploaded to YouTube by producer David Siller in 2015.
- Jurassic Park: Chaos Effect, an animated television series based on The Lost World: Jurassic Park, was confirmed to be in development within the third part of a four-part comic adaptation of the film published by Topps Comics in July 1997. In November 1997, it was reported that the cartoon would be accompanied by Jurassic Park: Chaos Effect, a series of dinosaur toys produced by Kenner and based on a premise that scientists had created dinosaur hybrids consisting of DNA from different creatures. That month, it was also reported that the cartoon could be ready by March 1998, as a mid-season replacement. The Chaos Effect toyline was released in June 1998, but the animated series was never produced, for unknown reasons.

== See also ==
- Illumination
- DreamWorks Animation
  - DreamWorks Animation Television
- List of Universal Pictures theatrical animated feature films
- List of unproduced Universal Pictures animated projects
- List of animation studios owned by NBCUniversal
