= Shelley Duvall's Bedtime Stories =

- Also known as: Bedtime Stories
- Genre: Anthology
- Created by: Shelley Duvall
- Presented by: Shelley Duvall
- Starring: Various
- Country of origin: United States
- Original language: English
- No. of seasons: 2
- No. of episodes: 13

Production
- Executive producers: Shelley Duvall; Carol Davies
- Running time: 30 minutes
- Production companies: Think Entertainment; Universal Cartoon Studios

Original release
- Network: Showtime
- Release: April 21, 1992 – December 11, 1994

Related
- Faerie Tale Theatre; Tall Tales & Legends; Nightmare Classics

Shelley Duvall's Bedtime Stories (also known as Bedtime Stories) is an American live-action/animated anthology television series that originally ran on Showtime from April 21, 1992 to December 11, 1994. The series, hosted by Shelley Duvall, was a showcase of short animated adaptations of children's literature with narration provided by celebrity guests. The VHS tapes were released by MCA/Universal Home Video, but were closed-captioned by the National Captioning Institute instead of Captions, Inc.

== Format ==
Shelley Duvall hosts a showcase of animated adaptations of children's books from her pop-up book bedroom. The first season's hosting segments are limited to Duvall herself, but in the second season a lamp named Clicker and a Clock named Ticker were added to the segments.

Each episode would typically contain two segments where Duvall would introduce the book which would then transition to an animated segment read by a celebrity guest narrator. Guests who appeared on the show included: Ringo Starr, Bette Midler, Dudley Moore, John Candy, Rick Moranis, Bonnie Raitt, Sissy Spacek, Michael J. Fox, Martin Short and James Earl Jones

== Cast ==
- Shelley Duvall as herself/host
- B. J. Ward as Clicker the Lamp
- Jeff Bennett as Ticker the Clock

== Episodes ==
=== Season 1 (1992) ===
No. overall	No. in season	Title	Directed by	Written by	Original release date
1	1	"Elizabeth and Larry/Bill and Pete"	Arthur Leonardi	Unknown	April 21, 1992
Segment 1: Elizabeth and Larry by Marilyn Sadler, illustrated by Roger Bollen, narrated by Jean Stapleton Segment 2: Bill and Pete by Tomie dePaola, narrated by Dudley Moore
2	2	"Blumpoe the Grumpoe Meets Arnold the Cat/Millions of Cats"	Arthur Leonardi	Unknown	April 28, 1992
Segment 1: Blumpoe the Grumpoe Meets Arnold the Cat by Jean Davies Okimoto, illustrated by Howie Schneider, narrated by John Candy Segment 2: Millions of Cats by Wanda Gág, narrated by James Earl Jones
3	3	"There's a Nightmare in My Closet/There's an Alligator Under My Bed/There's Something in My Attic"	Arthur Leonardi	Unknown	May 5, 1992
Segment 1: There's a Nightmare in My Closet by Mercer Mayer, narrated by Michael J. Fox Segment 2: There's an Alligator Under My Bed by Mercer Mayer, narrated by Christian Slater Segment 3: There's Something in My Attic by Mercer Mayer, narrated by Sissy Spacek
4	4	"Elbert's Bad Word/Weird Parents"	Arthur Leonardi	Unknown	May 12, 1992
Segment 1: Elbert's Bad Word by Audrey Wood, illustrated by Audrey and Don Wood, narrated by Ringo Starr Segment 2: Weird Parents by Audrey Wood, narrated by Bette Midler
5	5	"Little Toot & the Loch Ness Monster/Choo Choo"	Arthur Leonardi	Hardie Gramatky	May 19, 1992
Segment 1: Little Toot and the Loch Ness Monster by Hardie Gramatky, narrated by Rick Moranis Segment 2: Choo Choo by Virginia Lee Burton, narrated by Bonnie Raitt
6	6	"Patrick's Dinosaurs/What Happened to Patrick's Dinosaurs?"	Arthur Leonardi	Unknown	May 26, 1992
Segment 1: Patrick's Dinosaurs by Carol Carrick, illustrated by Donald Carrick, narrated by Martin Short Segment 2: What Happened to Patrick's Dinosaurs by Carol Carrick, illustrated by Donald Carrick, narrated by Martin Short

=== Season 2 (1993–94) ===
No. overall	No. in season	Title	Directed by	Written by	Original release date
7	1	"Tugford Wanted to Be Bad/Little Penguin's Tale"	Arthur Leonardi	Unknown	September 19, 1993
Segment 1: Tugford Wanted to Be Bad by Audrey Wood, narrated by Steve Martin Segment 2: Little Penguin's Tale by Audrey Wood, narrated by Candice Bergen
8	2	"My New Neighbors/Rotten Island"	Arthur Leonardi	Unknown	September 26, 1993
Segment 1: My New Neighbors written by Keith Faulkner, illustrated by Jonathan Lambert, narrated by Billy Crystal Segment 2: Rotten Island by William Steig, narrated by Charles Grodin
9	3	"Moe, the Dog in Tropical Paradise/Amos, The Story of an Old Dog and His Couch"	Arthur Leonardi	Unknown	October 3, 1993
Segment 1: Moe, the Dog in Tropical Paradise by Diane Stanley, illustrated by Elise Primavera, narrated by Richard Dreyfus Segment 2: Amos, The Story of an Old Dog and His Couch by Susan Seligson & Howie Schneider, narrated by Morgan Freeman
10	4	"The Little Rabbit Who Wanted Red Wings/Katy No Pocket"	Arthur Leonardi	Unknown	October 10, 1993
Segment 1: The Little Rabbit Who Wanted Red Wings by Carolyn Sherwin Bailey, illustrated by Jacqueline Rogers, narrated by Shelley Duvall Segment 2: Katy No Pocket by Emmy Payne, illustrated by H.A. Rey, narrated by Mary Steenburgen
11	5	"Bootsie Barker Bites/Ruby the Copycat"	Arthur Leonardi	Unknown	October 17, 1993
Segment 1: Bootsie Barker Bites written by Barbara Bottner, illustrated by Peggy Rathmann, narrated by Rhea Perlman Segment 2: Ruby the Copy Cat by Peggy Rathmann, narrated by Shelley Long
12	6	"Aunt Ippy's Museum of Junk/Uncle Wizzmo's New Used Car"	Arthur Leonardi	Unknown	October 24, 1993
Segment 1: Aunt Ippy's Museum of Junk by Rodney Greenblat (later known for character design in Parappa the Rapper), narrated by Kathy Bates Segment 2: Uncle Wizzmo's New Used Car by Rodney Greenblat, narrated by Ed Begley Jr.
13	7	"The Christmas Witch"	Arthur Leonardi	Unknown	December 11, 1994
The Christmas Witch by Steven Kellogg, narrated by Angela Lansbury

== Accolades ==
Shelley Duvall's Bedtime Stories was nominated for Primetime Emmy Award for Outstanding Animated Program in the 44th Primetime Emmy Awards in 1992 but lost to Claymation Easter on CBS.
