= List of Faerie Tale Theatre episodes =

The following is a list of episodes of the family television anthology Faerie Tale Theatre, also known as Shelley Duvall's Faerie Tale Theatre which ran on Showtime from 1982 to 1987, airing a total 27 episodes.

The series featured numerous Hollywood actors (particularly of the period), with Robin Williams and Teri Garr in the first episode, "The Tale of the Frog Prince". Creator and executive producer Shelley Duvall appeared in 3 episodes and narrated 3 episodes. John Achorn is credited in 11 character roles, while others, including Jean Stapleton, Mark Blankfield, Charlie Dell, Donovan Scott, and Dan Frischman, are credited in more than three episodes.

== Series overview ==
Season	Episodes	Originally released	
Season	Episodes	First released	Last released
1	2	September 11, 1982	October 16, 1982
2	6	February 5, 1983	December 5, 1983
3	7	January 9, 1984	September 17, 1984
4	7	February 12, 1985	October 5, 1985
5	2	July 14, 1986	August 11, 1986
6	3	March 23, 1987	November 14, 1987

== Episodes ==
=== Season 1 (1982) ===
No. overall	No. in season	Title	Based on	Directed by	Written by	Original release date	Prod. code
1	1	"The Tale of the Frog Prince"	The Frog Prince	Eric Idle	Eric Idle	September 11, 1982	101
A spoiled princess is forced to keep her promise to a talking frog who is an enchanted prince when he retrieves her golden ball from the bottom of a well. Starring Robin Williams as the Frog Prince, Teri Garr as the Princess, René Auberjonois as King Ulrich, Candy Clark as Queen Gwynneth, Roberta Maxwell as Queen Beatrice and Griselda, Michael Richards as King Geoffrey, and Eric Idle as the narrator.
2	2	"Rumpelstiltskin"	Rumpelstiltskin	Emile Ardolino	Gerald Ayres	October 16, 1982	102
A tiny man lends a helping hand to a miller's daughter who is forced to answer for her father's tall tale that she can spin gold from straw. Starring Ned Beatty as the King, Shelley Duvall as the Miller's Daughter, Paul Dooley as the Miller, Jack Fletcher as the Wizard, Bud Cort as the Page, and Hervé Villechaize as Rumpelstiltskin.

=== Season 2 (1983) ===
No. overall	No. in season	Title	Based on	Directed by	Written by	Original release date	Prod. code
3	1	"Rapunzel"	Rapunzel	Gilbert Cates	David Wyles	February 5, 1983	201
A beautiful and young girl named Rapunzel is taken from her parents by an evil witch and brought up in an isolated tower that can only be accessed by climbing her unnaturally long and blonde hair until a handsome prince goes there to rescue her. Starring Shelley Duvall as Rapunzel and Rapunzel's mother, Jeff Bridges as the Prince and Rapunzel's father, Gena Rowlands as the Witch, and Roddy McDowall as the narrator.
4	2	"The Nightingale"	The Nightingale	Ivan Passer	Joan Micklin Silver	May 10, 1983	202
A Chinese Emperor finds true friendship from a lowly kitchen maid and a plain little bird; both of whom are worth more than they appear. Starring Mick Jagger as the Emperor, Barbara Hershey as the Maid, Bud Cort as the Music Master, Mako as the Gardener, Keye Luke as the Imperial Doctor, Edward James Olmos as the Prime Minister, Anjelica Huston as Primrose, Jerry Hall as Pansy, and Shelley Duvall as the narrator and the Nightingale.
5	3	"Sleeping Beauty"	Sleeping Beauty	Jeremy Kagan	Jeffery Alan Fiskin	July 7, 1983	203
A handsome prince on the search for a princess best known as the Sleeping Beauty bumps into a woodsman who tells him the story of the Sleeping Beauty, the fabled sleeping princess. Starring Bernadette Peters as Sleeping Beauty, Christopher Reeve as Prince Charming, Beverly D'Angelo as Henbane the Wicked Fairy, Carol Kane as the Good Fairy, George Dzundza as the Woodsman, Sally Kellerman as Queen Natasha, René Auberjonois as King Boris, Ron Rifkin as the Squire, and Richard Libertini as King Murray.
6	4	"Jack and the Beanstalk"	Jack and the Beanstalk	Lamont Johnson	Rod Ash and Mark Curtiss	September 8, 1983	204
A dreamer boy named Jack one day finds that his dreams have grown to enormous proportions. Starring Dennis Christopher as Jack, Elliott Gould as the Giant, Jean Stapleton as the Giantess, Katherine Helmond as Jack's Mother, and Mark Blankfield as the Strange Little Man, the Fairy, and the narrator.
7	5	"Little Red Riding Hood"	Little Red Riding Hood	Graeme Clifford	Rod Ash and Mark Curtiss	November 10, 1983	205
An overprotected young lady named Mary learns that there is merit to her parents' advice that she stick to the path and not talk to strangers. Starring Mary Steenburgen as Mary (Little Red Riding Hood), Malcolm McDowell as Reginald Von Lupin (the Wolf), Frances Bay as Granny, John Vernon as Mary's Father, Diane Ladd as Mary's Mother, and Darrell Larson as Chris.
8	6	"Hansel and Gretel"	Hansel and Gretel	James Frawley	Patricia Resnick	December 5, 1983	206
A boy named Hansel and his sister named Gretel who are left to fend for themselves in the woods and stumble upon a curious house made out of candy that belongs to an evil witch. Starring Ricky Schroder as Hansel, Bridgette Andersen as Gretel, Joan Collins as the Witch and Stepmother, and Paul Dooley as Hansel and Gretel's Father.

=== Season 3 (1984) ===
No. overall	No. in season	Title	Based on	Directed by	Written by	Original release date	Prod. code
9	1	"Goldilocks and the Three Bears"	Goldilocks and the Three Bears	Gilbert Cates	Rod Ash and Mark Curtiss	January 9, 1984	301
Goldilocks, a precocious girl with a penchant for telling tall tales, learns the value of honesty and of respecting others' privacy. Starring Tatum O'Neal as Goldilocks, Hoyt Axton as the Forest Ranger, John Lithgow as Goldilocks' Father, Carole King as Goldilocks' Mother, Alex Karras as Papa Bear, Brandis Kemp as Mama Bear, and Donovan Scott as Cubby Bear.
10	2	"The Princess and the Pea"	The Princess and the Pea	Tony Bill	Rod Ash and Mark Curtiss	April 16, 1984	302
A bored prince decides that the best way to cheer himself up is to get married. As he goes through his mother's list of eligible princesses, an outspoken young candidate appears at the castle with raucous claims. Starring Liza Minnelli as Princess Alecia, Tom Conti as Prince Richard, Beatrice Straight as Queen Veronica, Pat McCormick as King Fredrico, Tim Kazurinsky as the Fool, and Nancy Allen as Princess Elizabeth.
11	3	"Pinocchio"	The Adventures of Pinocchio	Peter Medak	Rod Ash and Mark Curtiss	May 14, 1984	303
When lonely puppet maker Geppetto wishes with all his might to have a real son, the Blue Fairy grants him and a wooden puppet named Pinocchio the chance to make that wish come true. Starring Paul Reubens as Pinocchio, Carl Reiner as Geppetto, Lainie Kazan as Sofia the Blue Fairy, James Coburn as the Gypsy, Jim Belushi as Mario, Michael Richards as Vince, Vincent Schiavelli as the Priest, and Don Novello as the narrator. Note: This production depicts The Terrible Dogfish as an enormous orca.
12	4	"Thumbelina"	Thumbelina	Michael Lindsay-Hogg	Maryedith Burrell	June 11, 1984	304
Thumbelina, a girl the size of a human thumb, embarks on a great adventure in the big wide world. Starring Carrie Fisher as Thumbelina, William Katt as the Flower Prince, Burgess Meredith as Mr. Mortimer Mole, Donovan Scott as Herman Toad, Conchata Ferrell as Thumbelina's Mother, and David Hemmings as the narrator.
13	5	"Snow White and the Seven Dwarfs"	Snow White and the Seven Dwarfs	Peter Medak	Robert C. Jones	July 16, 1984	305
A beautiful young princess named Snow White is forced to flee for her life, when her "crime" of simply being fairest in the kingdom arouses murderous intentions in the jealous and evil Queen, who also happens to be the girl's stepmother. Starring Elizabeth McGovern as Snow White, Vanessa Redgrave as the Evil Queen, Vincent Price as the Magic Mirror, Lou Carry, Tony Cox, Billy Curtis, Phil Fondacaro, Daniel Frishman, Peter Risch, and Kevin Thompson as the Dwarves, and Rex Smith as the Prince.
14	6	"Beauty and the Beast"	Beauty and the Beast	Roger Vadim	Robert C. Jones	August 13, 1984	306
A merchant's beautiful youngest daughter simply named Beauty, sacrifices her freedom to save her father when he is taken captive by a "monster", who also turns out to be a cursed prince. Starring Susan Sarandon as Beauty, Klaus Kinski as the Beast, Stephen Elliott as Beauty's Father, and Nancy Lenehan and Anjelica Huston as Beauty's sisters.
15	7	"The Boy Who Left Home to Find Out About the Shivers"	The Story of the Youth Who Went Forth to Learn What Fear Was	Graeme Clifford	Bruce Franklin Singer	September 17, 1984	307
A boy who doesn't know what fear is sets out into the world, hoping to learn for himself what it means to be afraid. Starring Peter MacNicol as Martin, Dana Hill as Princess Amanda, Christopher Lee as King Vladimir V, David Warner as Zandor the Innkeeper, Jack Riley as the Deacon, Frank Zappa as Atilla, and Vincent Price as the narrator.

=== Season 4 (1985) ===
No. overall	No. in season	Title	Based on	Directed by	Written by	Original release date	Prod. code
16	1	"The Three Little Pigs"	The Three Little Pigs	Howard Storm	Rod Ash and Mark Curtiss	February 12, 1985	401
The mother of three little pigs sends her sons out into the world to find their fortune in their own individual ways and The Big Bad Wolf's nagging wife sends him out to get dinner. Starring Billy Crystal as Larry Pig, Jeff Goldblum as Buck Wolf, Valerie Perrine as Tina, Doris Roberts as Mother Pig, Fred Willard as Paul Pig, and Stephen Furst as Peter Pig.
17	2	"The Snow Queen"	The Snow Queen	Peter Medak	Maryedith Burrell	March 11, 1985	402
A young girl named Gerda begins a perilous journey to rescue her best friend named Kay after he is taken by the fabled Snow Queen. Starring Melissa Gilbert as Gerda, Lance Kerwin as Kay, Lee Remick as the Snow Queen, Lauren Hutton as the Lady of Summer, Linda Manz as the Robber Girl, David Hemmings as the voice of the Reindeer, and Shelley Duvall as the narrator.
18	3	"The Pied Piper of Hamelin"	The Pied Piper of Hamelin	Nicholas Meyer	Nicholas Meyer	April 5, 1985	403
Told entirely in the original poem as a bedtime story to a young boy in 1840 England, the Mayor, Town Council and the whole German town of Hamelin in the year 1376 learns the heavy price of going back on their promise to the magical Pied Piper who helped rid their village of rats. Starring and narrated by Eric Idle.
19	4	"Grimm Party"	N/A	N/A	N/A	July 17, 1985	404
Reunion episode, featuring cast/crew interviews, scripted skits, and recaps. Note: The final episode produced, but not last to air.
20	5	"Cinderella"	Cinderella	Mark Cullingham	Rod Ash and Mark Curtiss	August 14, 1985	405
A beautiful and young girl named Cinderella recovering from the two deaths of her father and her mother finds herself reduced to a servant in her evil stepmother and her two evil stepsisters, her new stepfamily's household, but is given the surprise of her life when her fairy godmother appears to lend a helping hand. Starring Jennifer Beals as Cinderella, Matthew Broderick as Prince Henry, Jean Stapleton as the Fairy Godmother, Eve Arden as the Stepmother, James Noble as King Rupert III, Edie McClurg and Jane Alden as the Stepsisters, and Joseph Maher as the narrator.
21	6	"Puss in Boots"	Puss in Boots	Robert Iscove	Jules Feiffer	September 9, 1985	406
A young man and son of a wind miller journeys from rags-to-riches thanks to his talented talking cat, Puss in Boots. Starring Ben Vereen as Puss, Gregory Hines as Edgar, Alfre Woodard as Princess Lovinia, George Kirby as King Fortuitous, Brock Peters as the Ogre, and Shelley Duvall as the narrator.
22	7	"The Emperor's New Clothes"	The Emperor's New Clothes	Peter Medak	Rod Ash and Mark Curtiss	October 5, 1985	407
An Emperor in 18th-century Europe with peacock tendencies becomes the target for two con men who use his self-indulgence against him. Starring Dick Shawn as the Emperor, Alan Arkin as Bo, Art Carney as Morty, Clive Revill as the Prime Minister, Georgia Brown as Maggie, Barrie Ingham as the Finance Minister, and Timothy Dalton as the narrator.

=== Season 5 (1986) ===
No. overall	No. in season	Title	Based on	Directed by	Written by	Original release date	Prod. code
23	1	"Aladdin and His Wonderful Lamp"	Aladdin	Tim Burton	Rod Ash and Mark Curtiss	July 14, 1986	501
A common boy named Aladdin has big dreams, which he finds coming true when he is approached by a Moroccan magician who presents him an offer he cannot refuse. Starring Robert Carradine as Aladdin, James Earl Jones as the Genie of the Lamp and Genie of the Ring, Leonard Nimoy as the Evil Moroccan Magician, Valerie Bertinelli as Princess Sabrina, Joseph Maher as the Sultan, Rae Allen as Aladdin's Mother, and Ray Sharkey as the Grand Vizier.
24	2	"The Princess Who Had Never Laughed"	The Princess Who Never Smiled	Mark Cullingham	David Felton	August 11, 1986	502
In a kingdom where all frivolity is banned, a princess who has grown up never knowing what laughter is decides that she will marry the first man who can make her laugh, but it takes a peasant's youngest son and his pig to bring out both the laughter and the truth. Starring Ellen Barkin as Princess Henrietta, Howie Mandel as Wienerhead Waldo, Howard Hesseman as the King, Sofia Coppola as Gwendolyn (credited as Domino Coppola), Michael Tucci as Lionel, Jackie Vernon as Phlegmatic Jack, Barrie Ingham as the Tutor, and William Daniels as the narrator.

=== Season 6 (1987) ===
No. overall	No. in season	Title	Based on	Directed by	Written by	Original release date	Prod. code
25	1	"Rip Van Winkle"	Rip Van Winkle	Francis Ford Coppola	Rod Ash and Mark Curtiss	March 23, 1987	601
The story of a lazy man who sleeps for twenty years after wandering off in the mountains and playing ninepins with unusual men. Starring Harry Dean Stanton as Rip Van Winkle, Talia Shire as Wilma Van Winkle, Roy Dotrice as Peter Vanderdonk, Mark Blankfield as Derrick Van Bummel, Ed Begley Jr. as Brom Dutcher, Christopher Penn as Will Tussenbrook, Tim Conway as the Mayoral Candidate, and John P. Ryan as Hendrick Hudson. Note: This episode is based on a story by Washington Irving, whose most famous one is The Legend of Sleepy Hollow, which was the basis of the first episode of Shelley Duvall's follow-up series Tall Tales & Legends.
26	2	"The Little Mermaid"	The Little Mermaid	Robert Iscove	Anne Beatts	April 6, 1987	602
A young and beautiful mermaid named Pearl falls in love with a human prince named Andrew and sacrifices everything to be with him. Starring Pam Dawber as Pearl, Treat Williams as Prince Andrew, Helen Mirren as Princess Emilia, Karen Black as the Sea Witch, Brian Dennehy as King Neptune, and Laraine Newman and Donna McKechnie as Pearl's sisters.
27	3	"The Dancing Princesses"	The Twelve Dancing Princesses	Peter Medak	Maryedith Burrell	November 14, 1987	603
Set in a fictional country during the Napoleonic Wars, a widowed king who is overly protective of his six daughters discovers that their dancing shoes are mysteriously being worn out every night, and offers to let any prince who can solve the mystery choose any of the six princesses to have as his bride, but when the cleverness of the eldest daughter proves too much for the princes, it is up to a wandering soldier to discover the secret. Starring Lesley Ann Warren as Princess Jeanetta, Peter Weller as the Soldier, Roy Dotrice as the King, Zelda Rubinstein as the Old Woman, Ian Abercrombie as the Royal Cobbler, and Max Wright as Prince Heinrick.
