= Think Entertainment =

Film and television production company

- Industry: Motion pictures, Entertainment
- Founded: 1988
- Fate: closed
- Headquarters: United States
- Key people: Shelley Duvall (CEO)
- Products: Film; Television

Think Entertainment was a production company owned by actress Shelley Duvall to produce children's television and films. During its first years the company had a first look deal with MCA/Universal who distributed some of their titles such as Shelley Duvall's Bedtime Stories.

== History ==
Think Entertainment was jointly owned by Duvall and her Cable MSO partners, consisting of Tele-Communications Inc., United Artists Entertainment, and Newhouse Broadcasting. Duvall bought out the MSO partners in February 1991. In 1993, Think partnered with UK-based Enchante, Ltd. owned by Ayman Sawaf following the expiration of the first look deal with MCA/Universal in November 1992. Enchante had bought out half of the production company.

== Productions ==
- Mrs. Piggle-Wiggle (1994)
- Shelley Duvall's Bedtime Stories (1992)
- Stories from Growing Up (1991)
- Nick Jr. Rocks (1991)
- Nightmare Classics (1989)
- Mother Goose Rock 'n' Rhyme (1990)
