= Rico Mambo =

Single by Breakfast Club
- Released: 1984
- Genre: Dance-pop; new wave
- Length: 4:10
- Label: ZE Records
- Songwriter: Dan Gilroy
- Producer: Steve Bray

Breakfast Club singles chronology
"Rico Mambo" (1984)	"Right on Track" (1987)

"Rico Mambo" is a 1984 single by the American band Breakfast Club. Written by the band's lead singer Dan Gilroy and originally produced by drummer Stephen Bray, it was re-recorded for the band's eponymous 1987 album with production by Deodato.

== Early releases ==
Breakfast Club signed with ZE Records, first issuing the "Rico Mambo" in 1984 as a standalone single with "Walk It Off" as a b-side. Distributed by Island Records, the single saw release as both 7″ and 12″ singles on five continents, but failed to chart anywhere.

With its inclusion on the successful Breakfast Club in 1987, the new version of the song saw release in Europe and Australia by MCA on both 7″ and 12″ singles, this time with "Tongue Tied" as a b-side. It again failed to chart.

== Later popularity ==
In 1989, ZE Records re-released the 1984 "Rico Mambo" as part of the Zetrospective: Dancing in the Face of Adversity compilation. Reviewer Robert Christgau praised the album as "the first postmodern dance music—dance music with a critical spirit", but dismissed "Rico Mambo" as "cheesy".

The 1984 version of "Rico Mambo" was first released in the Philippines in 1985. In 2007, the Philippine CPDRC Dancing Inmates performed "Rico Mambo" at their prison in Cebu

In 2019 a "Club Mix" and a "Club Mix Radio Edit" of the 1984 version were released on music streaming services.

== Charts ==
=== Weekly charts ===
Chart (1987)	Peak position
Italy Airplay (Music & Media)	17
