= Fred Fuchs =

American film and television producer

Frederic S. Fuchs
- Occupations: Film producer; television producer
- Known for: Bram Stoker's Dracula; The Godfather Part III

Frederic S. Fuchs (/fjuːks/) is a television and film producer active in the United States and Canada, where he holds dual citizenship. He became an executive in the Canadian Broadcasting Corporation (CBC) on April 3, 2006.

== Career ==
Fuchs became known for the television series Faerie Tale Theatre. He afterwards became president of American Zoetrope, and thus had a hand in producing films such as The Godfather Part III (1990), The Rainmaker (1997) and The Virgin Suicides (1999). With CBC, his work included the television series What It's Like Being Alone (2006). Later, he was an executive producer of the Starz and GK-TV series Camelot. Most recently, Fuchs has been the executive producer of the films Monkey Beach (2020) and The Virtuoso (2021). He also has founded a charitable organization that owns and operates an independent cinema, the Westdale Theatre, in Hamilton, Ontario.

Fuchs gained further attention when he was the subject of a joke in the web series Angry Video Game Nerd, originating in an episode where James Rolfe's character "The Nerd" sees Fuchs' name in the credits of Bram Stoker's Dracula and jokingly pronounces it "Fred Fucks." This later became a recurring joke throughout the series, with Gilbert Gottfried portraying a fictionalized version of him, as a deranged programmer who developed the PlayStation 4 game Life of Black Tiger (actually from Korean developer 1Games). A separate fictionalization of Fuchs additionally appears as the final boss in Angry Video Game Nerd Adventures and its enhanced port Angry Video Game Nerd I & II Deluxe; in the original release, his likeness was based on that of the game's lead programmer, Sam Beddoes, while in the rerelease, he was given a new design in Gottfried's likeness and new dialogue matching the personality of Gottfried's portrayal of the character.

== Honours ==
Fuchs was nominated for Emmy Awards in 1988, 1997 and 1998, for producing the TV series Tall Tales and Legends, the TV miniseries The Odyssey and the TV miniseries Moby Dick.

== Filmography ==
He was a producer for all films listed below unless otherwise noted.

=== Film ===
Year	Film	Credit
1988	Tucker: The Man and His Dream	
1989	New York Stories	
1989	Vietnam War Story: The Last Days	Executive producer
1990	The Spirit of '76	Executive producer
1990	The Godfather Part III	Executive producer
1992	Wind	Executive producer
1992	Bram Stoker's Dracula	
1993	The Secret Garden	
1994	Don Juan DeMarco	
1994	Mary Shelley's Frankenstein	Executive producer
1995	Haunted	
1996	Jack	
1997	Buddy	
1997	The Rainmaker	
1998	Lani Loa – The Passage	Executive producer
1999	The Florentine	Executive producer
1999	The Virgin Suicides	Executive producer
1999	The Third Miracle	
2000	Beautiful Joe	
2006	The End of Silence	Executive producer
2007	Graduation	Executive producer
2016	Population Zero	Executive producer
2016	Total Frat Movie	Executive producer
2016	Milton's Secret	
2018	Love Jacked	Executive producer
2018	Little Italy	Executive producer
2020	Monkey Beach	Executive producer
2021	The Virtuoso	Executive producer

Miscellaneous crew

Year	Film	Role
1978	Jennifer	Production assistant

As an actor

Year	Film	Role
1995	City Dragon	Karate Dojo Fighters

Thanks

Year	Film	Role
1988	Killer Klowns from Outer Space	Special thanks
2009	High Life	Special thanks
2021	The Virtuoso	The producers wish to thank

=== Television ===
Year	Title	Credit	Notes
1986	Popples	Executive producer	Television pilot
1985−86	Tall Tales & Legends		
1982−87	Faerie Tale Theatre	Associate producer	
1988	Vietnam War Story	Executive producer	
1990	The Godfather Family: A Look Inside	Executive producer	Documentary
1995	Tecumseh: The Last Warrior	Executive producer	Television film
1995	Kidnapped	Executive producer	Television film
1996	Dark Angel	Executive producer	Television film
1996	Titanic	Executive producer	
1997	Riot	Executive producer	Television film
1997	Survival on the Mountain	Executive producer	Television film
1997	The Odyssey	Executive producer	
1998	Outrage	Executive producer	Television film
1998	Moby Dick	Executive producer	
2005	Yesteryears	Executive producer	Television short
2006	What It's Like Being Alone	Executive producer	
2011	Camelot	Executive producer	
2013	Mother Up!	Executive producer	
2012−14	Transporter: The Series	Executive producer	

Miscellaneous crew

Year	Title	Role	Notes
2007	The Robber Bride	Executive director: CBC TV Arts and Entertainment	Television film
2009	Being Erica	Executive director	
2007−10	The Tudors	Executive director	

Thanks

Year	Title	Role	Notes
1990	The Godfather Family: A Look Inside	Thanks	Documentary
2008	jPod	Special thanks	
