= Right on Track (song) =

Single by Breakfast Club

from the album Breakfast Club
- Released: January 1987
- Recorded: 1986
- Genre: New wave; synthpop
- Length: 4:18
- Label: MCA
- Songwriters: Dan Gilroy; Stephen Bray
- Producer: Jimmy Iovine

Breakfast Club singles chronology
"Rico Mambo" (1984)	"Right on Track" (1987)	"Kiss and Tell" (1987)

Music video
- "Right on Track" on YouTube

"Right on Track" is a 1987 hit single by the American band Breakfast Club. Written by the band's lead singer and drummer, Dan Gilroy and Stephen Bray respectively, the single climbed to number 7 on the US Billboard Hot 100 chart on May 30, 1987. The single also peaked at number 54 on the UK Singles Chart and number 7 on the Billboard Dance Club Songs chart that same year.

== Charts ==
=== Weekly charts ===
Chart (1987)	Peak position
Australia (Kent Music Report)	4
Belgium (Ultratop 50 Flanders)	16
Netherlands (Dutch Top 40)	10
Netherlands (Single Top 100)	16
New Zealand (Recorded Music NZ)	30
UK Singles (Official Charts)	54
Cash Box (Cashbox)	11
US Billboard Hot 100	7
US Dance Club Songs (Billboard)	7
West Germany (GfK)	32

=== Year-end charts ===
Chart (1987)	Position
Australia (Kent Music Report)	31
Netherlands (Dutch Top 40)	97
US Billboard Hot 100	94
