= Breakfast Club (band) =

American pop group

Background information
- Origin: New York City, U.S.
- Genres: New wave; synth-pop
- Years active: 1979–1988; 2023
- Labels: ZE; MCA
- Past members: Dan Gilroy; Ed Gilroy; Gary Burke; Stephen Bray; Paul Kauk; Hannah Watkins; Megan Watkins; Alex Potts; Austin Phillips; Randy Jackson; Madonna; E. Doctor Smith; Angie Smit

Breakfast Club is an American musical group. Their biggest hit single was "Right on Track" (1987), which peaked at No. 7 on the US Billboard Hot 100 chart. The song was remixed for a commercial release in a 12" version for dance and club play by John "Jellybean" Benitez and became a top 10 hit on the Billboard Magazine Hot Dance Club Play chart. After 35 years of absence, in 2022 the band reformed and released a new single called "Could We Not Stop Dancing?" followed by "Fantasy Street" in December 2023.

== History ==
The group was formed in New York City in 1979 and went through several line-ups, including one in which future pop star Madonna was the drummer. In the early 1980s, the band included Madonna, Angie Smit on bass, and the Gilroy brothers, Dan and Ed, both on guitar (Dan sang lead vocals as well). Dan Gilroy was also briefly Madonna's boyfriend, and he eventually allowed her to sing some lead vocals. Madonna ultimately left to form a new band, Emmy and the Emmys.

In the mid-1980s, the band consisted of the Gilroys (with Dan exclusively on vocals, while Ed provided all guitars), Gary Burke (bass), and Stephen Bray (drums). Both Bray and Burke previously had been Madonna's bandmates in Emmy and the Emmys.

The group signed with ZE Records, first issuing the non-charting single "Rico Mambo" in 1984. They later released an eponymous album in 1987 on MCA Records, which spawned the US hit "Right on Track". A majority of their music videos, including "Right on Track", were filmed by Jeff Stein, director of the Who documentary The Kids Are Alright. They were nominated in the category of Best New Artist at the Grammy Awards in 1988. Sometime after the first album, Randy Jackson (bass) joined the band, though original bassist Burke also remained in the line-up.

The band's last single was a cover version of the Beatles song "Drive My Car" for the 1988 feature film License to Drive. A second album was recorded circa 1988, but was rejected by MCA and was not issued at the time. Shortly afterwards the band broke up.

Bray co-wrote several big hits with Madonna in the 1980s. Dan Gilroy later starred in Mother Goose Rock 'n' Rhyme (1990) and Mrs. Piggle-Wiggle (1994).

In 2008, The Daily Beast published a previously unreleased tape of the Breakfast Club. The tape included pillow talk between Dan Gilroy and Madonna, as well as several previously unheard songs such as "Tell the Truth", which she says is the first song she ever wrote.

On April 5, 2016, Breakfast Club released a new EP, Percolate, which features songs from the group's unreleased second album. This was the group's first release of new material in almost three decades.

== Madonna and the Breakfast Club ==
In 2019, the docudrama film Madonna and the Breakfast Club was released on digital and on-demand platforms. Directed by Guy Guido and starring Jamie Auld as Madonna, the film explores Madonna's struggling pre-fame years in New York with the Breakfast Club leading up to her first solo record deal.

== Discography ==
=== Studio albums ===
Title	Details	Peak chart positions	
Title	Details	US	AUS
Breakfast Club	Released: 1987; Label: MCA; Format: LP, CD	43	26

=== EPs ===
- 2016 – Percolate

=== Singles ===
Title	Year	Peak chart positions					
Title	Year	US	US Dance	AUS	NZ	Can	UK
"Rico Mambo"	1984	—	—	—	—	—	—
"Right on Track"	1987	7	7	4	30	19	54
"Kiss and Tell"	1987	48	—	—	—	—	—
"Rico Mambo" (new version)	1987	—	—	—	—	—	—
"Never Be the Same"	1987	—	8	—	—	—	91
"Expressway to Your Heart"	1988	—	30	—	—	—	—
"Drive My Car"	1988	—	—	—	20	—	—
"—" denotes releases that did not chart or were not released in that territory.
