= Playhouse Video =

Defunct sub-label of CBS/Fox Video

- Logo used from 1984 to 1989
- Type: Division of CBS/Fox Video
- Industry: Home video
- Predecessor: CBS/Fox Children's Video
- Founded: 1984; 42 years ago
- Defunct: 1989; 37 years ago
- Fate: Replaced by Fox Family Features
- Successor: Fox Family Features
- Headquarters: New York City, New York, United States
- Area served: Worldwide
- Products: Prerecorded videos
- Owner: CBS/Fox Video

Playhouse Video was a sub-label of CBS/Fox Video operating from 1984 to 1989. The company was responsible for release of some older, kids and family aimed Fox films, in addition to other things CBS/Fox Video had the rights to at the time. The company was shut down in 1989, and years later, 20th Century Fox Home Entertainment made another kids and family aimed label called "Fox Family Features".

== History ==
The company was launched in 1984 by CBS/Fox Video as CBS/Fox Children's Video. The company was shut down in 1989, and years later, 20th Century Fox Home Entertainment made another kids and family aimed label called "Fox Family Features".

== Short-lived predecessor ==
The company was formerly known as CBS/Fox Children's Video, which was a short-lived kids and family unit of CBS/Fox Video that was used for one year for the releases of A Boy Named Charlie Brown, Snoopy, Come Home, and Sarah and the Squirrel before becoming Playhouse Video a year later with Faerie Tale Theatre.
