= Shelley Duvall =

American actress and producer (1949–2024)

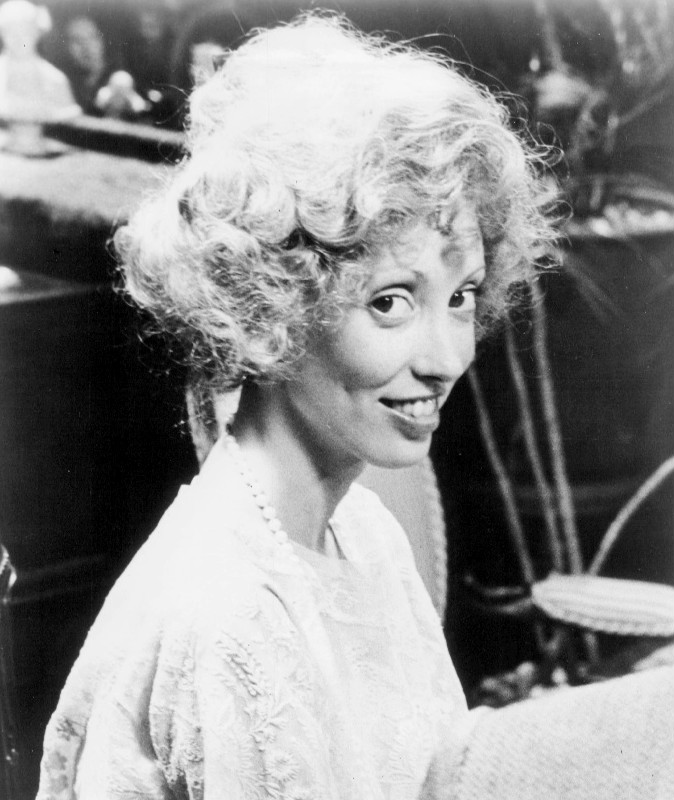
- Duvall in 1977
- Born: Shelley Alexis Duvall; July 7, 1949; Fort Worth, Texas, U.S.
- Died: July 11, 2024 (aged 75); Blanco, Texas, U.S.
- Occupations: Actress; producer
- Years active: 1970–2002; 2022–2024
- Works: Full list
- Spouse: Bernard Sampson (m. 1970; div. 1974)
- Partner(s): Paul Simon (1976–1978); Dan Gilroy (1989–2024)

Shelley Alexis Duvall (July 7, 1949 – July 11, 2024) was an American actress and producer known for her distinctive screen presence, portrayals of eccentric characters, and later productions in children's programming. Her accolades include a Cannes Award and a Peabody Award, in addition to nominations for a British Academy Film Award and two Primetime Emmy Awards. Four of Duvall's films have been preserved in the National Film Registry by the Library of Congress as "culturally, historically, or aesthetically significant" as of 2025.

Duvall was born in Fort Worth, Texas, and raised in Houston, Texas, and was initially interested in science. In 1970, she was hosting a party for her boyfriend at the time at her house, where she was discovered by filmmaker Robert Altman. Impressed by her upbeat personality, Altman cast her in the black comedy film Brewster McCloud that same year. She rose to fame by collaborating with Altman throughout the 1970s, appearing in the Western film McCabe & Mrs. Miller (1971), the crime film Thieves Like Us (1974), and the musical Nashville (1975). She received critical acclaim for her performance in Altman's psychological drama film 3 Women (1977), which earned her a Cannes Award and a nomination for the BAFTA Award for Best Actress. That same year, she had a supporting role in Woody Allen's romantic comedy Annie Hall. She became one of the most successful actresses of the 1970s by the end of the decade.

Duvall gained fame for playing Wendy Torrance in Stanley Kubrick's horror film The Shining (1980), with both her performance and filming experiences receiving continued attention. Also in 1980, she played Olive Oyl in Altman's adventure film Popeye. She increased her profile appearing in Terry Gilliam's fantasy film Time Bandits (1981), Tim Burton's short film Frankenweenie (1984), and Fred Schepisi's comedy film Roxanne (1987). The 1980s also saw Duvall venture into producing children's programming, founding the production companies Platypus and Think Entertainment and creating the programs Faerie Tale Theatre (1982–1987), Tall Tales & Legends (1985–1987), and Shelley Duvall's Bedtime Stories (1992–1994). She received Emmy nominations for Outstanding Children's Program and Outstanding Animated Program.

In the 1990s, Duvall sold her companies and acted infrequently, notably appearing in Steven Soderbergh's thriller film The Underneath (1995) and Jane Campion's drama film The Portrait of a Lady (1996). After her role in Gabrielle Burton's comedy film Manna from Heaven (2002), she announced an indefinite hiatus from acting. Her mental health during this period was covered by the media, briefly turning her private life public. She returned and announced a comeback in 2022 with the independent film The Forest Hills (2023), which would become her final role. Duvall died of diabetes complications on July 11, 2024.

== Early life ==
Shelley Alexis Duvall was born on July 7, 1949, in Fort Worth, Texas, the first child of Bobbie Ruth Crawford (née Massengale, 1929–2020), a real estate broker and in the legal field, and Robert Richardson "Bobby" Duvall (1919–1994), a cattle auctioneer-turned-lawyer. Her younger brothers were Scott, Shane, and Stewart.

For her first few years, Duvall lived in various locations throughout Texas due to her father's work, before the family settled in Houston when she was five years old. She was in a choir. She was an artistic and energetic young child, eventually earning the nickname "Manic Mouse" from her mother. Growing up, Duvall's only exposure to acting was when she forgot her lines to Joyce Kilmer's poem "Trees" in a sixth-grade talent show. She became interested in science at a young age; as a teenager she aspired to become a scientist. After graduating from Waltrip High School in 1967, she sold cosmetics at Foley's, a department store; she attended South Texas Junior College and majored in nutrition and diet therapy. Duvall dropped out of college shortly after when she witnessed a monkey vivisection.

== Career ==
=== 1970–1976: Discovery by Robert Altman and breakthrough ===
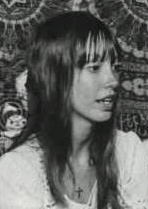
Duvall in 1971, after her discovery by filmmaker Robert Altman

On April Fool's Day 1970, Duvall was hosting a party in Houston for her artist boyfriend, Bernard Sampson, when three crew members in town for Brewster McCloud (1970) pre-production arrived. Intrigued by Duvall's offbeat looks and hyper-enthusiasm, they invited her to pitch Bernard’s paintings the next day to "art patrons". In a surreptitious casting call led by Robert Altman, Bert Remsen, and Lou Adler, they asked her to be part of the feature instead. Altman reflected on casting Duvall: "I was really quite mean to her, as I thought she was an actress. But she wasn’t kidding; that was her. She was an untrained, truthful person. She was very raw in Brewster but quite magic." Filmed in the summer of 1970, Duvall appeared in the film as Suzanne Davis, an Astrodome tour guide and the free-spirited love interest to Bud Cort's reclusive Brewster. After filming ended Duvall left Texas for the first time flying across the country with duties to promote the film, appearing in several publications and photoshoots such as Vogue and Show Magazine. Though not an immediate success, the film was received positively and brought attention to Duvall. Beatrice Loayza of The Atlantic believes her character "would've seemed innocuous enough were it not for the actor's hypnotic charms".

Following Brewster McCloud, Duvall became a protégé of Altman. Her first commercial success came with playing the supporting character of an unsatisfied mail-order bride in McCabe & Mrs. Miller, released in 1971. It was received negatively upon release but has retrospectively been acclaimed, and it is Duvall's first film to enter the United States National Film Registry. Her leading role as Keechie, the forlorn daughter of a convict, in Thieves Like Us followed three years later in 1974. Her experience in Thieves Like Us made her realize she wanted to take acting seriously. Duvall reflected on this turning point: “Until then it had been a piece of cake. Then I began realizing about technique, began learning, began being a little scared."

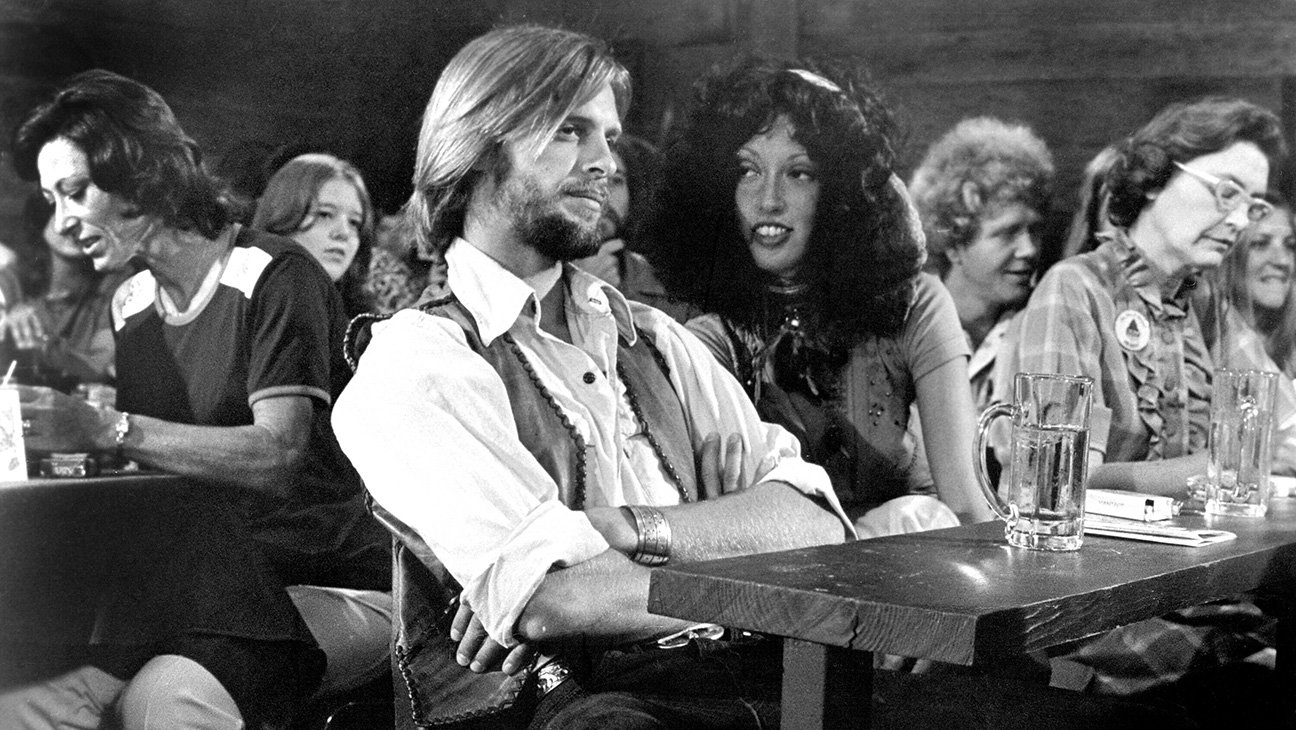
Duvall with Keith Carradine in Nashville (1975)

Duvall had her breakthrough playing Martha, a spaced-out groupie, in Altman's 1975 ensemble comedy film Nashville. The film was a major critical and commercial success, becoming the most "talked about American movie" and grossing $10 million. Keith Carradine, who collaborated with Duvall on Thieves Like Us and Nashville, told Variety: "She had that fascinating physical appearance, there was something slightly off-center and hauntingly beautiful about her. And then she had that extraordinary personality; she was quirky and just utterly enchanting. What you saw on screen, that's just who she was." Nashville would be her second film selected for the National Film Registry. The following year, she played the First Lady, wife of Grover Cleveland, in Altman's Buffalo Bill and the Indians, or Sitting Bull's History Lesson, which was released to mixed reviews. Also in 1976, Duvall starred as Bernice, a wealthy girl from Wisconsin, in the PBS adaptation of F. Scott Fitzgerald's short story Bernice Bobs Her Hair.

=== 1977–1981: Critical acclaim and mainstream recognition ===
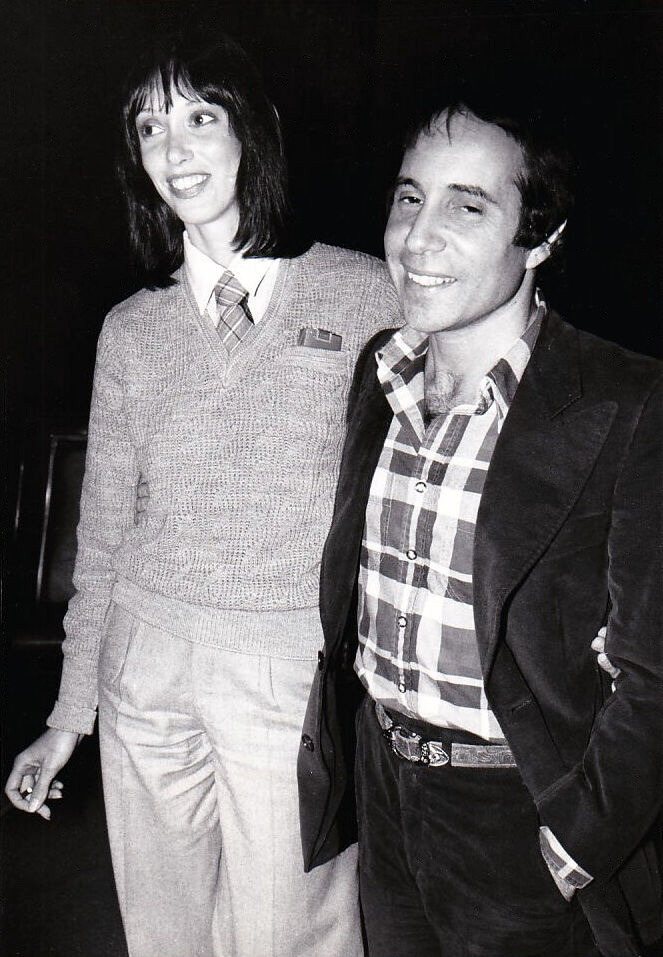
Duvall with Paul Simon in 1977

In 1977, Duvall gave what some critics considered to be one of her best performances in Altman's psychological thriller 3 Women, portraying Mildred "Millie" Lammoreaux, a woman living in a dreary California desert town. Although there was a written screenplay, Duvall, like other cast members, improvised many of her lines. In spite of the film not being a major box-office success, it received critical acclaim. Texas Monthly critics Marie Brenner and Jesse Kornbluth praised Duvall for giving an "extraordinary performance". Michael Sragow of The New Yorker called her "brilliant: she coins a brand-new caricature of the confident yet clueless single female, then suggests a real person underneath." Robbie Freeling of IndieWire believed the film succeeded because of Duvall: "it's one of the finest films of the seventies, and Duvall deserves a lion's share of the credit." Anne Billson at The Guardian agreed, calling it "peak Duvall" and "quite simply one of the greatest performances of the 1970s." Her performance garnered the Cannes Film Festival Award for Best Actress and the Los Angeles Film Critics Association Award for Best Actress, as well as a British Academy Film Award for Best Actress in a Leading Role nomination. Also in 1977, she appeared in a minor role in Woody Allen's Annie Hall, her third film to be added to the National Film Registry, and hosted an evening of Saturday Night Live. On Saturday Night Live, she appeared in five sketches: "Programming Change", "Video Vixens", "Night of the Moonies", "Van Arguments", and "Goodnights".

Duvall's next role was portraying Wendy Torrance in the horror film The Shining (1980), directed by Stanley Kubrick. Jack Nicholson said in the 2001 documentary Stanley Kubrick: A Life in Pictures that Kubrick was great to work with but that he was "a different director" with her. Because of his methodical nature, principal photography took a year to complete. The film's script was changed so often that Nicholson stopped reading each draft. Kubrick antagonized his actors, and he and she argued frequently. He intentionally isolated her and went through exhausting shoots, such as the baseball bat scene, which she had performed 127 times, although the validity of this story has been questioned. Afterward, she presented Kubrick with clumps of hair that had fallen out due to the extreme stress of filming. For the last nine months of shooting, she said that the role required her to cry twelve hours a day, five or six days a week, and "it was so difficult being hysterical for that length of time". In an interview with Roger Ebert, Duvall said that making the film was "almost unbearable. But from other points of view, really very nice, I suppose." In a 2001 interview, she later said "I wouldn't trade the experience for anything. Why? Because of Stanley. And it was a fascinating learning experience, it was such intense work that I think it makes you smarter. But I wouldn't want to go through it again." In a 2021 interview with The Hollywood Reporter, Duvall spoke openly of the emotional toll of the role and the challenges of long days on the set, but said that Kubrick was "very warm and friendly" to her.

Duvall earned positive reviews for her performance in The Shining, but she was controversially nominated for Worst Actress at the Golden Raspberry Awards' inaugural ceremony; it was rescinded on March 31, 2022, and Golden Raspberries cofounder Maureen Murphy said she regretted nominating Duvall. The Shining is her fourth and final film to enter the National Film Registry. Billson of The Guardian stated that "Duvall's horrified reactions as her husband reveals himself to be a mortal threat provide the film with many of its iconic moments." Bilge Ebiri of Vulture wrote: "Looking into Duvall's huge eyes from the front row of a theater, I found myself riveted by a very poignant form of fear. Not the fear of an actor out of her element, or the more mundane fear of a victim being chased around by an ax-wielding maniac. Rather, it was something far more disquieting, and familiar: the fear of a wife who's experienced her husband at his worst, and is terrified that she'll experience it again." Jessica Jalali of Screen Rant ranked it the best performance of her career, calling her "the heart of the film; she is out of her depth in dealing with her husband's looming insanity while trying to protect her young son, all while being fearful of the malevolence around her". Tim Grierson of RogerEbert.com similarly called it one of her best performances, writing that "This is no simple "scream queen" performance as Duvall makes Wendy's terror and determination grippingly, movingly real. Did Kubrick push her to extremes to reach such heights? Perhaps, but the accomplishment is Duvall's, full stop."

While Duvall was in London shooting The Shining, Robert Altman cast her to portray Olive Oyl in his big-screen adaptation of Popeye, opposite Robin Williams. The film was also released in 1980 to commercial success. Popeye received negative critical reviews upon release, but the reviews have improved over time; Duvall was nonetheless praised for her performance. Roger Ebert wrote: "Duvall is like a precious piece of china with a tinkling personality. She looks and sounds like almost nobody else, and if it is true that she was born to play the character Olive Oyl (and does so in Altman's new musical Popeye), it is also true that she has possibly played more really different kinds of characters than almost any other young actress of the 1970s." Staff at Variety agreed that Duvall "makes a delightful Olive Oyl". Better received was Terry Gilliam's Time Bandits (1981), where she played a small supporting role. It was critically acclaimed and a box-office success.

=== 1982–1992: Continued success and television projects ===
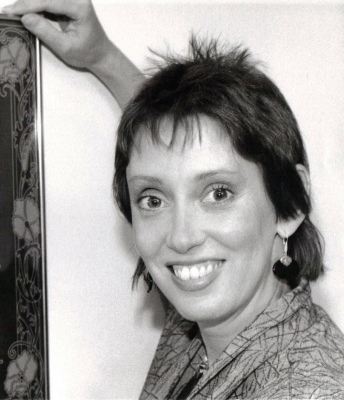
Duvall in a 1985 promotional photo

In 1982, Duvall narrated, hosted, and was executive producer of the children's television program Faerie Tale Theatre. She starred in seven episodes of the series; "Rumpelstiltskin" (1982), "Rapunzel" (1983), "The Nightingale" (1983), "Snow White and the Seven Dwarfs" (1984), "Puss in Boots" (1985), and "Aladdin and His Wonderful Lamp" (1986). Before the program's first episode "The Frog Prince", which starred Robin Williams and Teri Garr, Duvall produced 27 hour-long episodes of the program. In 1985, she created Tall Tales & Legends, another one-hour anthology series for Showtime, which featured adaptations of American folk tales. As with Faerie Tale Theatre, the series starred well-known Hollywood actors with Duvall as host, executive producer, and occasional guest star. The series ran for nine episodes and garnered Duvall an Emmy nomination.

Duvall next landed roles as the mother of a boy whose dog is struck by car in Tim Burton's short film Frankenweenie (1984), and as Laura Burroughs in Booker (also 1984), a biographical television short based on the life of Booker T. Washington, directed by Stan Lathan. Of her role in Frankenweenie, Jacob Slankard of Collider described Duvall as "the most persuasive tool" Burton had, and believed he succeeded in "calling on an actress who can signal to the audience that she's much more than her initial bearings make her out to be, and that was Duvall's specialty." She next appeared as a lonely and timid woman who receives a message from a flying saucer in The Twilight Zone episode "The Once and Future King/A Saucer of Loneliness" (1987), and the friend of Steve Martin's character in the comedy Roxanne (also 1987).

In 1988, Duvall founded a new production company called Think Entertainment to develop programs and television movies for cable channels. She had started another production company, Platypus, in 1982. She created Nightmare Classics (1989), a third Showtime anthology series, which featured adaptations of well-known horror stories by authors including Edgar Allan Poe. Unlike the previous two series, Nightmare Classics was aimed at a teenage and adult audience. It was the least successful series that Duvall produced for Showtime and ran for only four episodes.

In 1990, she played Little Bo Peep in Mother Goose Rock 'n' Rhyme, which she also produced. In 1991, Duvall portrayed Jenny Wilcox, the wife of Charlie Wilcox (Christopher Lloyd) in the Hulk Hogan action-adventure film Suburban Commando. In October of the same year, Duvall released two compact discs, Hello, I'm Shelley Duvall... Sweet Dreams, which feature Duvall singing lullaby songs and Hello, I'm Shelley Duvall... Merry Christmas, on which Duvall sings Christmas songs.

In 1992, Think Entertainment joined the newly formed Universal Family Entertainment to create Duvall's fourth Showtime original series, Shelley Duvall's Bedtime Stories, which featured animated adaptations of children's storybooks with celebrity narrators and garnered her a second Emmy nomination. Also in 1992, she landed a guest spot on the television series L.A. Law as a show dog owner and breeder who presses charges against the owner of a Welsh Corgi that mated with her prize-winning Afghan Hound.

=== 1993–2002: Decrease in workload and hiatus ===
While Duvall was producing Faerie Tale Theatre, it was reported that she was to star as the lead in the film adaptation of Tom Robbins's Even Cowgirls Get the Blues, which was also to star Mick Jagger, Jerry Hall, Cindy Hall, and Sissy Spacek. The project was delayed and, when finally released in 1993, starred an entirely different cast. Also in 1993, Duvall produced a fifth series for Showtime, Mrs. Piggle Wiggle, before selling Think Entertainment in 1993 and retiring as a producer.

Duvall next appeared as the vain, over-friendly, but harmless Countess Gemini—sister to the calculating Gilbert Osmond (John Malkovich)—in Jane Campion's 1996 adaptation of the Henry James novel The Portrait of a Lady. In 1997, she played a beatific nun in the comedy film Changing Habits and a besotted, murderous, ostrich-farm owner in Guy Maddin's fourth feature Twilight of the Ice Nymphs. In the same year, she played Chris Cooper's character's gullible wife who yearns for a better life in Horton Foote's made-for-television film, Alone. In 1998, she played Mrs. Jackson in the comedy Home Fries and Gabby in the direct-to-video children's film Casper Meets Wendy. Near the end of the decade, Duvall returned to the horror genre with a minor role in Tale of the Mummy (1998), co-starring Christopher Lee and Gerard Butler, and The 4th Floor (1999), co-starring Juliette Lewis.

In the 2000s, she accepted minor roles, including the mother of Matthew Lawrence's character in the horror-comedy Boltneck (2000) and Haylie Duff's aunt in the independent family film Dreams in the Attic, which was sold to the Disney Channel but was never released. After a small role in the 2002 independent film Manna from Heaven, Duvall took an extended hiatus from acting and public life. In an interview with People magazine, Duvall said of her retirement: "It's the longest sabbatical I ever took, but it was for really important reasons—to get in touch with my family again." During this time, she kept her personal life private, which nonetheless received media coverage.

=== 2022–2024: Brief return and intended comeback ===
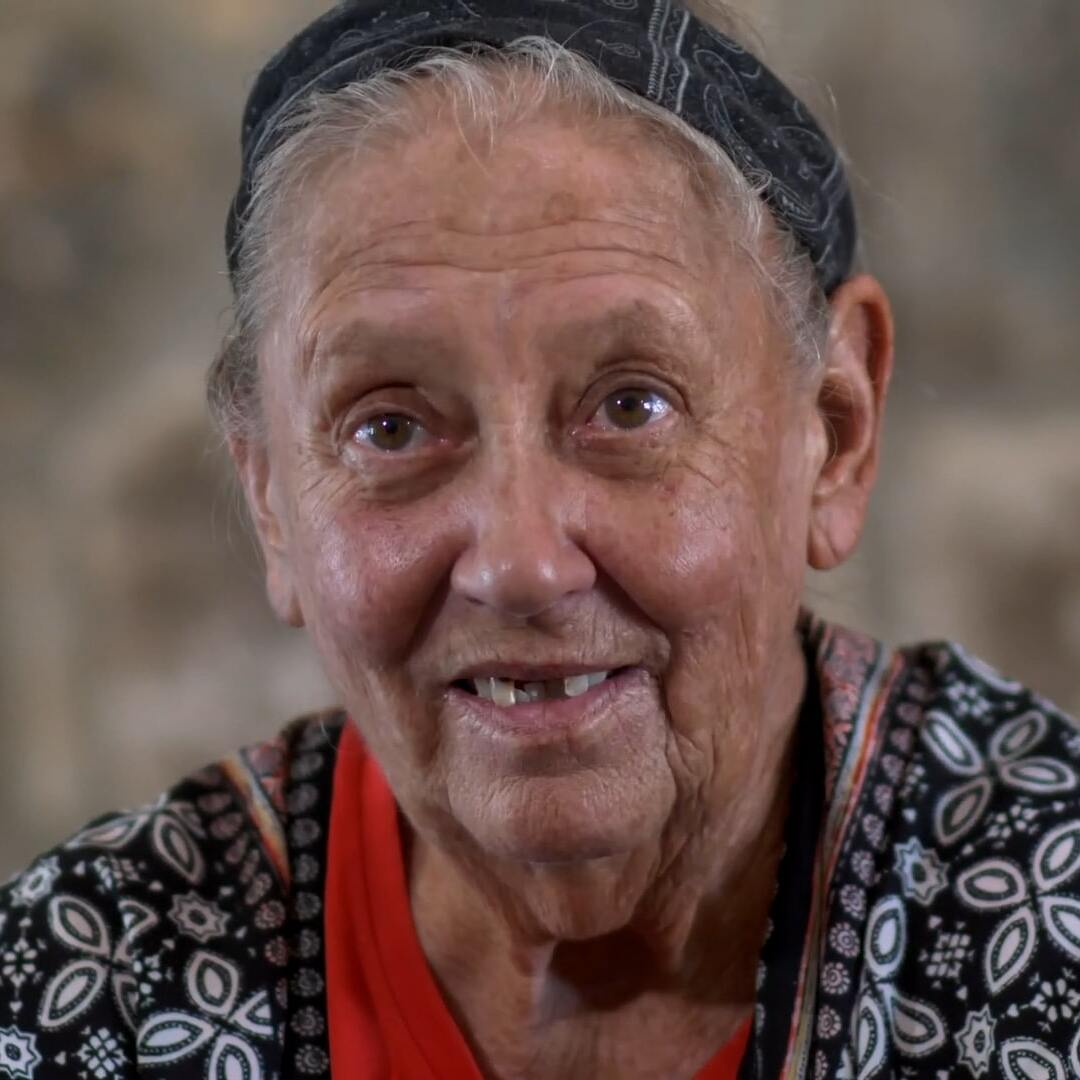
Duvall in a promotional trailer for The Forest Hills (2023), her final role

After a 20-year absence, it was announced in October 2022 that Duvall would be acting in The Forest Hills, an independent horror-thriller film directed and written by Scott Goldberg. The film is about a man "tormented by nightmarish visions after experiencing head trauma in the Catskill woods." Initially playing a cameo role, Duvall joined the ensemble after expressing interest in performing more scenes. She described her acting comeback as "so much fun" and joked that "Jessica Tandy won an Oscar when she was 80. I can still win." To Entertainment Weekly, Goldberg described her as "an amazing actress to work with, and I will forever be grateful for the opportunity to direct her." Duvall reportedly experienced discomfort and pains while filming, but she worked this into her performance as a form of method acting.

A trailer for The Forest Hills was released in November 2022, and it premiered at Smodcastle Cinemas in Atlantic Highlands, New Jersey in March 2023. A second trailer was released in September 2024, and the film was digitally released in October 2024. The Forest Hills received negative critic reviews and little attention, but Duvall's involvement received some praise. Paul Lê of Bloody Disgusting wrote that she "impacts the whole movie" but had too small of a role. Rue Morgue's Chris Hallock agreed that her appearance was brief, but nonetheless wrote, "her undeniable charisma and commanding presence provides a solemn grounding to the film's chaotic proceedings. The beloved actor looks confident in front of the camera".

== Personal life ==
=== Relationships ===
Duvall married artist Bernard Sampson in 1970, but their marriage disintegrated as Duvall's acting career accelerated, leading to their divorce in 1974. She met 26-year-old tobacco heir Patrick Reynolds in a Hollywood nightclub. Duvall invited Reynolds to the set of Nashville, where director Robert Altman cast him in the film. Reynolds and Duvall lived together until 1976.

While she was shooting Annie Hall in New York in 1976, Duvall met singer-songwriter Paul Simon. The couple began a relationship and lived together for two years. Their relationship ended when Duvall introduced Simon to her friend, actress Carrie Fisher, and the two began dating. Duvall briefly dated musician Ringo Starr in 1978.

Duvall was in a relationship with musician and former Breakfast Club lead vocalist Dan Gilroy from 1989 through the remainder of her life. The pair began their relationship after she cast him in Mother Goose Rock 'n' Rhyme. She had no children, but always had a menagerie of pets.

After the 1994 Northridge earthquake, Duvall and Gilroy moved from Benedict Canyon in Los Angeles to Blanco, southwest of Austin, Texas. She decided to return to her home state in 1994, while shooting the Steven Soderbergh film The Underneath. She told The New York Times that her reasons for moving were the health of one of her brothers and the earthquake. In 2002, Duvall retired from acting for 21 years.

=== Mental health ===
In November 2016, Duvall was interviewed by Phil McGraw on his daytime talk show, Dr. Phil, about her mental illness. The segment received significant criticism from the public, with some claiming she was exploited. Vivian Kubrick, daughter of director Stanley Kubrick, posted an open letter to McGraw on Twitter, and actress Mia Farrow tweeted that it was "upsetting and unethical to exploit Shelley Duvall at this vulnerable time in her life".

Director Lee Unkrich located Duvall in 2018 to interview her for his book, Stanley Kubrick's The Shining. Unkrich noted that Duvall remained very proud of her career. In 2021, Seth Abramovitch, writer for The Hollywood Reporter, found Duvall for an interview saying, "I only knew that it didn't feel right for McGraw's insensitive sideshow to be the final word on her legacy." The article noted that her memory was "sharp and full of engrossing stories".

== Death ==
After several months in hospice care, Duvall died due to complications from diabetes at her home in Blanco, Texas, on July 11, 2024, four days after her 75th birthday. Her death was announced by Gilroy to The Hollywood Reporter. Several tributes were posted to Duvall, including messages from Stephen King and the Stanley Kubrick estate.

== Legacy ==
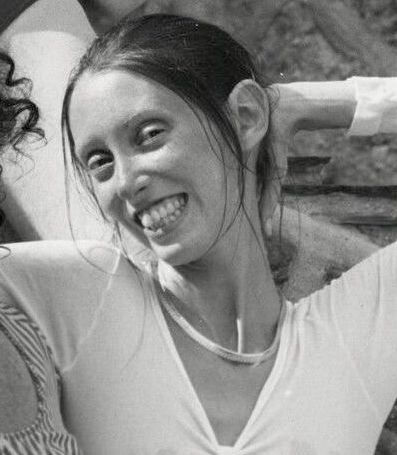
Duvall in 1975

Known for her charismatic, upbeat presence, Duvall is considered one of the most successful actresses of the 1970s. Four of her films have been inducted in the United States National Film Registry for being "culturally, historically or aesthetically significant": McCabe & Mrs. Miller (1971), Nashville (1975), Annie Hall (1977), and The Shining (1980). For her role in the lattermost, she was established as a scream queen by several publications. MovieWeb ranked Duvall as the fifth-best scream queen of all time, writing that her performance in The Shining was "a thing of glory". She is also credited by the Los Angeles Times for reviving children's television.

Beatrice Loayza of The Atlantic said that Duvall was "made for the screen" and called her "a gravitational force". Günseli Yalcinkaya of Dazed dubbed her the "queen of awkward beauty" and "one of the most magnetic on-screen presences of the last century." Robert Lang of Deadline Hollywood deemed Duvall as the 1970s "cinema's new darling". Peter Bradshaw of The Guardian described her as "unique and often misunderstood" and said she "was intensely modern, the very face of the New American Cinema, but was also in her slender grace and wide-eyed charm, and her way with a cigarette, a neo-flapper, a kind of 20s or 30s woman reborn long after the second world war which also made her an excellent casting choice in period movies." The New York Times called her a "fixture" of Hollywood, and wrote: "With her gossamer frame and toothy smile, she was one of the biggest film stars of the 1970s." The New Yorker critic Pauline Kael once called her the "female Buster Keaton" and believed she was "bizarrely original… able to be herself on the screen in a way that nobody has ever been before." Giacomo Aricò of Vogue deemed her "bewitching" and a "master of cinema".

Jamie Lee Curtis cited Duvall as an influence, writing: "She showed that you could change and grow and develop and, of course, now we see so many wonderful actresses and actors become producers and directors and creators. Thank you, Shelley Duvall. You are a legend." Julianne Moore called Duvall "one of the women that made me want to become an actress. She was fascinating, original, vulnerable and inscrutable all at once." Others who have praised her work in tributes include Woody Allen, Mia Farrow, Daryl Hannah, Michael Palin, Malcolm McDowell, and Paul Simon.

In the 2020s, clips of Duvall hosting Faerie Tale Theatre went viral on social media, such as TikTok, where the phrase "Hello, I'm Shelley Duvall" has frequently been sampled. The resurgence of Faerie Tale Theatre helped introduce her to Generation Z. Since 2021, Sarah Lukowski of the online Shelley Duvall Archive has been documenting Duvall's extensive career and post-Hollywood life as a fan-turned-friend of the reclusive star.

Duvall's death spurred several tribute screenings in theaters around the United States. In August and September 2024, several of Duvall's films were shown at the Brattle Theatre. The Brooklyn Academy of Music screened Duvall's films in November 2024. In December 2024, the Austin Film Society hosted a four-day series in celebration of Duvall's achievements in film and television. The 2024 Primetime Emmy Awards attracted controversy after Duvall and others (Note: Others omitted include Erica Ash, Tyler Christopher, Joe Flaherty, Matthew Perry, Chita Rivera, and Johnny Wactor.) were omitted from the "In Memoriam" segment, instead being placed on a memoriam list on the Television Academy website. In March 2025, Duvall was included in the "In Memoriam" segments at the 97th Academy Awards and 3rd Annual Children's and Family Emmys Awards.

== Filmography ==
Duvall's most positively reviewed films, according to the review-aggregation website Rotten Tomatoes, include:

- Brewster McCloud (1970)
- McCabe & Mrs. Miller (1971)
- Thieves Like Us (1974)
- Nashville (1975)
- 3 Women (1977)
- Annie Hall (1977)
- The Shining (1980)
- Popeye (1980)
- Time Bandits (1981)
- Roxanne (1987)

According to The Numbers, Duvall's films have collectively grossed over $240 million worldwide.

== Discography ==
=== Studio albums ===
Title	Album details
Hello, I'm Shelley Duvall...Sweet Dreams	Released: 1991; Label: Rhino; Format: CD
Hello, I'm Shelley Duvall...Merry Christmas	Released: 1991; Label: Rhino; Format: CD

=== Soundtrack appearances ===
Title	Year	Soundtrack
"He's Large"	1980	Popeye
"Sailin'" (with Robin Williams)	1980	Popeye
"He Needs Me"	1980	Popeye

== Awards and nominations ==
Award	Year (Note: Indicates the year of ceremony. Each year is linked to the article about the awards held that year, wherever possible.)	Category	Nominated work	Result	Ref.
British Academy Film Awards	1978	Best Actress in a Leading Role	3 Women	Nominated	
Cannes Film Festival Awards	1977	Best Actress	3 Women	Won	
Gemini Awards	1998	Best Performance by an Actress in a Guest Role in a Dramatic Series	The Adventures of Shirley Holmes	Nominated	
~~Golden Raspberry Awards~~	~~1980~~	~~Worst Actress~~ (Note: Rescinded in 2022.)	~~The Shining~~	Nominated	
Los Angeles Film Critics Association Awards	1977	Best Actress	3 Women	Won	
National Society of Film Critics Awards	1977	Best Actress	3 Women	Runner-up	
New York Film Critics Circle Awards	1977	Best Actress	3 Women	Runner-up	
Peabody Awards	1984	Excellence in Radio and Television	Faerie Tale Theatre	Won	
Primetime Emmy Awards	1988	Outstanding Children's Program	Tall Tales & Legends	Nominated	
Primetime Emmy Awards	1992	Outstanding Animated Program	Shelley Duvall's Bedtime Stories	Nominated	
Texas Film Awards	2020	Hall of Fame	—	Inducted	
Women Film Critics Circle Awards	2019	Lifetime Achievement Award	—	Nominated	
