= Faerie Tale Theatre =

American anthology television series (1982–1987)

- The 6-DVD Starmaker II box set cover
- Also known as: Shelley Duvall's Faerie Tale Theatre
- Genre: Anthology; Fairytale fantasy Adventure; Drama
- Created by: Shelley Duvall
- Presented by: Shelley Duvall
- Starring: see below
- Country of origin: United States
- Original language: English
- No. of seasons: 6
- No. of episodes: 27 (list of episodes)

Production
- Executive producers: Shelley Duvall for Gaylord Production Company, Lion's Gate Films and Platypus Productions; Fred Fuchs
- Running time: 39–58 minutes
- Production companies: Gaylord Production Company; Lion's Gate Films; Platypus Productions

Original release
- Network: Showtime
- Release: September 11, 1982 – November 14, 1987

Related
- Tall Tales & Legends; Nightmare Classics; Bedtime Stories

Faerie Tale Theatre (also known as Shelley Duvall's Faerie Tale Theatre) is an American award-winning live-action fairytale fantasy drama anthology television series created and presented by actress Shelley Duvall. The series originally ran on Showtime from September 11, 1982, until November 14, 1987 before being sold internationally. Twenty-five of the series' 27 episodes are each a retelling of a classic fairy tale, particularly one written by The Brothers Grimm, Charles Perrault, or Hans Christian Andersen. Episode 18 is based on the poem "The Pied Piper of Hamelin".

The series, as a live-action adaptation, was notable for featuring a number of Hollywood actors and famous celebrities portraying the costumed characters, and also utilized filming by well-known directors.

Faerie Tale Theatre was followed by three other short anthology series also produced by Duvall, including Tall Tales & Legends, which follows a theme similar to the latter, with a focus on American folklore, Nightmare Classics (4 produced of the intended 6 episodes), aimed at an older audience, and Bedtime Stories (12 episodes).

== Series background ==
Actress Shelley Duvall, who conceived the series, served as executive producer and host alongside associate producers Bridget Terry and Fred Fuchs. Duvall also starred in three episodes, portraying various characters, and was a featured narrator of three episodes, as well as providing the voice of the animatronic nightingale, in the episode of the same title.

Every episode begins with Duvall introducing herself and giving a brief synopsis of the night's fairy-tale episode that would follow.

The series followed a style similar to an earlier fairy-tale anthology series, called Shirley Temple's Storybook, broadcast between 1958 and 1961, in which Shirley Temple serves as narrator, with this series also featuring numerous celebrities portraying the costumed characters.

The series was one of the first examples of original cable programming, alongside HBO's Fraggle Rock.

== Production ==
Duvall began the conception of Faerie Tale Theatre while she was filming the live-action 1980 film, Popeye, in Malta. She reportedly asked her co-star, Robin Williams, for his opinion on The Frog Prince, a fairy tale that she was reading during production. Williams thought that it was funny, and would later star in the namesake pilot episode of the series that was written, narrated, and directed by Monty Python's Eric Idle (who would appear in the episode "The Pied Piper of Hamelin").

Many of the episodes were produced by Fred Fuchs, in association with Duvall, with the screenplays written by Rod Ash, Mark Curtiss, Maryedith Burrell and Robert C. Jones. All of the episodes were produced and shot from 1982 to 1985, and videotaped mostly at the ABC Television Studios in Burbank, California.

Episodes were directed by Francis Ford Coppola, Ivan Passer, Emile Ardolino, and Tim Burton, as well as other famous Hollywood directors.

== Episodes ==
Season	Episodes	Originally released	
Season	Episodes	First released	Last released
1	2	September 11, 1982	October 16, 1982
2	6	February 5, 1983	December 5, 1983
3	7	January 9, 1984	September 17, 1984
4	7	February 12, 1985	October 5, 1985
5	2	July 14, 1986	August 11, 1986
6	3	March 23, 1987	November 14, 1987

== Artwork ==
Many episodes feature backdrops and settings inspired by specific artists and children's book illustrators.

Artist	Production
Maxfield Parrish	The Frog Prince
Norman Rockwell	Goldilocks and the Three Bears
Arthur Rackham	Hansel and Gretel
Edmund Dulac	The Nightingale
Aubrey Beardsley and Harry Clarke	The Princess and the Pea
Gustav Klimt	Rapunzel
N. C. Wyeth	Rumpelstiltskin, Snow White and the Seven Dwarfs
Kay Nielsen	Sleeping Beauty
Brueghel and Dürer	The Boy Who Left Home to Find Out About the Shivers
Jennie Harbour	Little Red Riding Hood
George Cruikshank	Thumbelina
Jean Cocteau	Beauty and the Beast

== Home media ==
Faerie Tale Theatre was released on VHS, Betamax, CED and Laserdisc in the 1980s through the mid-1990s, initially by CBS/FOX Video (which was also in Australia), followed by Playhouse Video (an extended label under CBS/FOX) and Razzmatazz Entertainment/Cabin Fever Entertainment. In the UK, it was released by MGM-UA Home Video. In Japan, in addition to other formats, all episodes were released individually on Video8 format by Sanrio.

Starmaker II held the rights to the series from 2004 to 2006, and at first, released 26 episodes as individual DVDs. This was followed by a double-sided 4-disc box set and a 6-disc box set, each version containing the same 26 episodes. The "Greatest Moments" episode was not included in this release.

In 2006, Koch Vision held the series' distribution rights, and that November, licensed the rights worldwide (excluding DVDs in North America) to the British company, 3DD Entertainment. A remastered 7-disc box set, including the lost "Greatest Moments" episode, was released by Koch Vision in September 2008. In 2009, Koch Vision released the episodes by theme on six DVD compilations: Tales from the Brothers Grimm ("Hansel and Gretel", "Rapunzel", "Rumpelstiltskin", and "Little Red Riding Hood"), Funny Tales ("The Tale of The Frog Prince", "Pinocchio", "The Three Little Pigs", and "The Princess Who Had Never Laughed"), Tales from Hans Christian Andersen ("The Emperor's New Clothes", "The Nightingale", "The Snow Queen", and "Thumbelina"), Princess Tales ("Cinderella", "The Little Mermaid", "The Dancing Princesses", and "The Princess and the Pea"), Magical Tales ("Aladdin and His Wonderful Lamp", "Beauty and the Beast", "Puss in Boots", and "Snow White and the Seven Dwarfs") and Bedtime Tales ("Jack and the Beanstalk", "Sleeping Beauty", "Rip Van Winkle", and "Goldilocks and the Three Bears").

When released on DVD by Starmaker II and Koch Vision, the following scenes were cut from the series:

- "Goldilocks and the Three Bears": Papa Bear and Mama Bear trying to fix Cubby Bear's chair; the Charades scene is shortened.
- "The Pied Piper of Hamelin": Julius Caesar Rat's monologue.
- "Rumpelstiltskin": the Miller's daughter singing with the animals in the forest (this scene was also cut from the VHS releases).

== Awards ==
Award	Result
Peabody Awards	Won
TCA Award	Won
Golden CableACE Award	Won

== Local and international broadcast ==
In the United States, the series was originally broadcast on Showtime from 1982 to 1987, and re-aired on the Disney Channel from 1994 to 1996. It was also broadcast in syndication on various television channels, including PBS and BookTelevision.

- In Italy, the series aired on Rai 1 every weekend in 1990, and mornings in 1991 and 1992, under the title Nel regno delle fiabe, translated to "In the Kingdom of Fairy Tales".
- In Brazil on TV Cultura
- In Hong Kong, it aired on ATV World every Saturday.
- In Mexico on Canal 5
- In India on DD National
- In Malaysia on TV2
- In Bulgaria on BNT 2
- In the Philippines on ABC 5
- In Bangladesh on Bangladesh Television
- In Sri Lanka on Rupavahini
- In Turkey on TRT 1
- In the United Kingdom on Channel 4

== See also ==
- Cannon Movie Tales
- Mother Goose Rock 'n' Rhyme
- Happily Ever After: Fairy Tales for Every Child
- The Fairytaler
