= The Underneath (film) =

American crime film

- Theatrical release poster
- Directed by: Steven Soderbergh
- Screenplay by: Sam Lowry (Note: Steven Soderbergh is credited as Sam Lowry for the screenplay); Daniel Fuchs
- Based on: Criss Cross by Don Tracy
- Produced by: John Hardy
- Starring: Peter Gallagher; Alison Elliott; William Fichtner; Adam Trese; Joe Don Baker; Paul Dooley; Shelley Duvall; Elisabeth Shue
- Cinematography: Elliot Davis
- Edited by: Stan Salfas
- Music by: Cliff Martinez
- Distributed by: Gramercy Pictures
- Release date: April 28, 1995
- Running time: 99 minutes
- Country: United States
- Language: English
- Budget: $6.5 million
- Box office: $536,023

The Underneath is a 1995 American crime film directed by Steven Soderbergh, from a screenplay he co-wrote under the pseudonym Sam Lowry with Daniel Fuchs, and starring Peter Gallagher and Alison Elliott. The film is based on the novel Criss Cross by Don Tracy, and is a remake of the original 1949 film adapted from the novel by Daniel Fuchs. The plot revolves around many themes common to film noir, including romantic intrigue, a botched crime, and a surprise ending.

== Plot ==
Michael Chambers returns home to celebrate his mother's remarriage. Michael had fled his hometown due to gambling debts and had left his wife Rachel to deal with the mess he created. He now attempts to renew his relationships with his family, his friends – and his enemies. The prodigal son obtains a job working for his mother's new husband as an armored car driver but when he is caught with Rachel by her hoodlum boyfriend, Dundee, he ends up concocting a plan to steal a payroll being transported by the armored car company to get out of his predicament.

== Cast ==
- Peter Gallagher as Michael Chambers
- Alison Elliott as Rachel
- William Fichtner as Tommy Dundee
- Adam Trese as David Chambers
- Joe Don Baker as Clay Hinkle
- Paul Dooley as Ed Dutton
- Shelley Duvall as Blake
- Elisabeth Shue as Susan Crenshaw
- Anjanette Comer as Mrs. Chambers
- Dennis Hill as Tom
- Harry Goaz as Casey
- Mark Feltch as George
- Jules Sharp as Hinkle's assistant
- Kenneth D. Harris as mantrap guard
- Vincent Gaskins as Michael's partner
- Cliff Haby as turret operator
- Tonie Perensky as ember waitress
- Randall Brady as ember bartender
- Richard Linklater as ember doorman
- Helen Cates as Susan's friend
- Kevin Crutchfield as VIP room flunky
- Brad Leland as man delivering money
- John Martin as Justice of the Peace
- C.K. McFarland as BonaFide delivery person
- Rick Perkins as TV delivery man
- Paul Wright as TV delivery man
- David Jensen as satellite dish installer
- Jordy Hultberg as TV sports reporter
- Steve Shearer as detective
- Fred Ellis as detective's partner
- Joe Chrest as Mr. Rodman
- Cowboy Mouth as band at concert (uncredited)
- Mike Enright as Embers V.I.P. (uncredited)
- Mark Hanson as bar patron (uncredited)
- Matthew Hurley as angry bar patron (uncredited)
- Mike Malone as smoking guy at concert (uncredited)
- Christopher K. Philippo as ember clubgoer (uncredited)
- Ryan Wickerham as guy at concert (uncredited)

== Reception ==
On review aggregator website Rotten Tomatoes, the film has a 64% approval rating based on 28 reviews. On Metacritic, the film has a weighted average score of 69 out of a 100 basing on 12 critics, indicating "generally favorable reviews".

Kenneth Turan of the Los Angeles Times wrote: "What The Underneath lacks is the kind of emotional connection that the best film noirs have. Instead of involving, this film is distancing, too given to admiring its own shiny surface".

Writing for Variety, Todd McCarthy said: "Steven Soderbergh attempts to navigate a tense story of a criminal heist into the uncustomarily deep waters of emotional, psychological and philosophical exploration in The Underneath, with intriguing results".

Barbara Shulgasser of the San Francisco Examiner praised film's director by calling him a "talent", but added: "he still hasn't found his groove. He seems to be searching for the project that will be a match for his talents. He needs to keep looking".

An identical observation of the film was made by Steven Winn of the San Francisco Chronicle. His comment was that: "The Underneath may turn out to have been more of a stylistic adventure for the director than for an audience".

Caryn James of The New York Times put her distaste in the film simply: "Too chaotic to work as a thriller".

The Washington Post critics had mixed reactions to the film. Joe Brown had praised the film, calling it: "Downbeat, laconically funny, arty (maybe a touch too arty), it's simmering, smoldering lowlife fun, like a good episode of Twin Peaks without the self-conscious weirdness". Meanwhile, Rita Kempley criticized the film, writing: "As tales of sex and sinfulness go, Soderbergh's fourth film doesn't deliver".

The film also got 2.5 out of 4 stars from Roger Ebert of the Chicago Sun-Times, and an "A−" from Owen Gleiberman of Entertainment Weekly.
