= The Forest Hills Festival Cut =

2023 horror film

The Forest Hills
- Theatrical release poster
- Directed by: Scott Goldberg
- Written by: Scott Goldberg
- Produced by: Elliott Dreznick
- Starring: Chiko Mendez; Shelley Duvall; Edward Furlong; Dee Wallace; Felissa Rose
- Cinematography: Scott Goldberg; Scott B. Hansen
- Edited by: Scott Goldberg; Scott B. Hansen; Chris Roll
- Music by: Scott Goldberg; Mark Nadolski
- Production companies: My Way Pictures; Dreznick Goldberg Productions; Digital Thunderdome
- Release dates: March 11, 2023 (Smodcastle Cinemas); October 4, 2024 (United States)
- Running time: 82 minutes
- Country: United States
- Language: English
- Budget: $250,000

The Forest Hills is a 2023 American crowdfunded independent horror-thriller film directed and written by Scott Goldberg. It stars Chiko Mendez as Rico, a man who, after hiking in the Catskill Mountains, experiences "nightmarish visions" involving his mother (Shelley Duvall). The film also features performances from Edward Furlong, Dee Wallace, and Felissa Rose.

The Forest Hills marked a brief acting comeback for Duvall after a twenty year absence, and also served as her final role; she died a few months before the film's release. The film was released in the United States on October 4, 2024.

== Plot ==
Rico (Chiko Mendez), a man in his 30s, embarks on a solo camping trip in the Catskill Mountains. During his hike, he suffers a traumatic head injury, which marks the beginning of his descent into madness. Upon returning home, Rico is plagued by nightmarish visions and a growing belief that he is transforming into a werewolf.

Back in his hometown, Rico reconnects with his estranged mother, Mama (Shelley Duvall), who is terminally ill with lung cancer. Their relationship is strained, Mama is portrayed as verbally abusive and unsupportive, exacerbating Rico's fragile mental state. As Rico's hallucinations intensify, he suspects that another werewolf is stalking him, further blurring the lines between reality and delusion.

Rico seeks solace in the company of his friend Billy (Edward Furlong) and his sister Emily. However, his erratic behavior and violent outbursts alienate those around him. He experiences vivid nightmares of transformation, violence, and death, leading him to believe that he is responsible for a series of brutal killings in the area. The film employs a non-linear narrative, interspersed with flashbacks and hallucinations, to depict Rico's deteriorating mental state.

As Rico's grip on reality weakens, he embarks on a killing spree, targeting those he perceives as threats or manifestations of his inner demons. The murders are depicted with intense gore and practical effects, including stabbings and asphyxiations. One particularly gruesome scene involves a campfire setting, reminiscent of classic werewolf transformations.

The film culminates in a confrontation between Rico and his inner demons.

== Cast ==
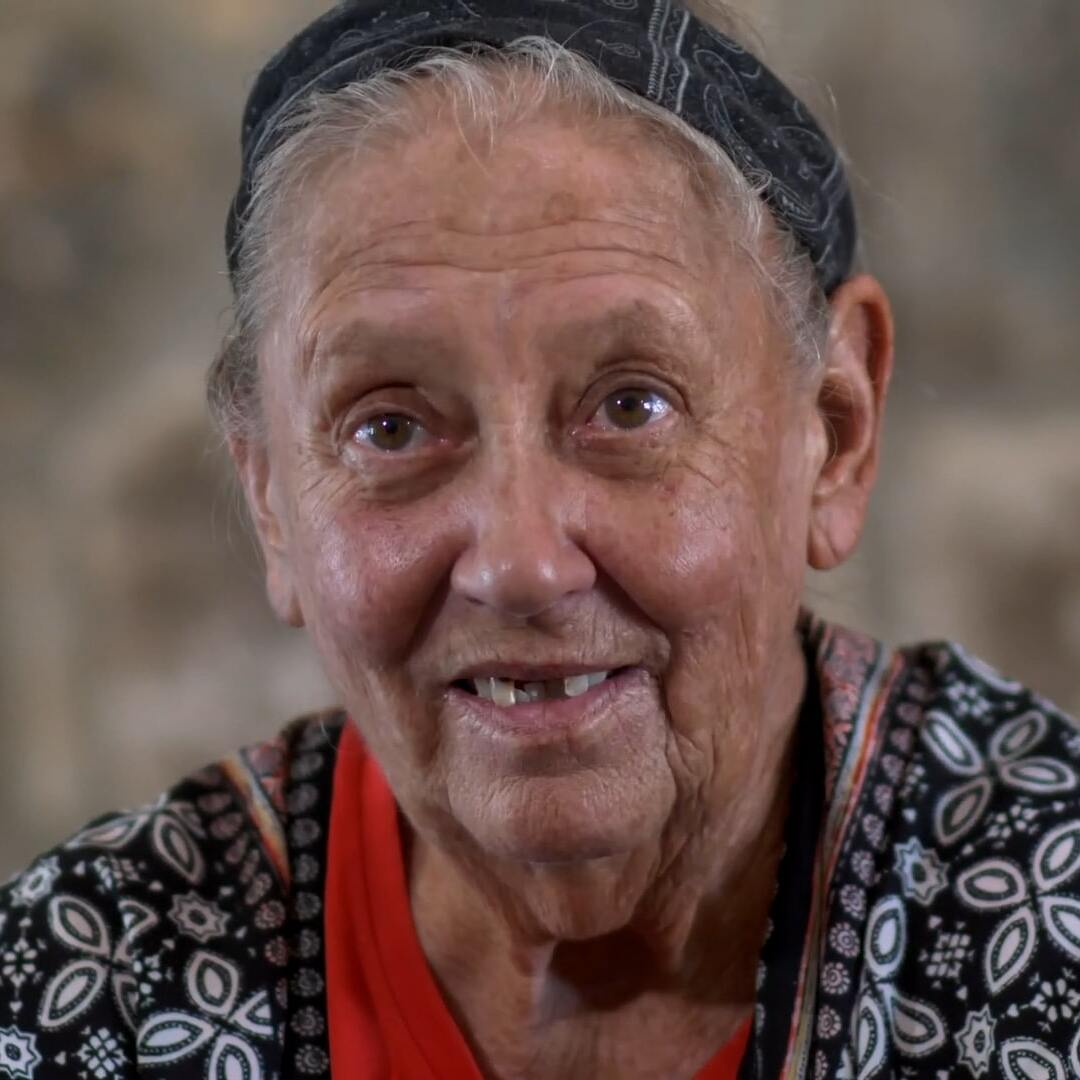
Duvall in a promotional trailer for The Forest Hills, her final role

- Chiko Mendez as Rico
- Shelley Duvall as Mama
- Edward Furlong as Billy
- Dee Wallace as Angela
- Felissa Rose as Dr. Gonzalez
- Stacey Nelkin as Debbie
- Marianne Hagan as Jordana

== Production ==
Goldberg directed and wrote the short film Danielle's Revenge in 2007, and later wrote The Forest Hills as an alternative take on the feature. In October 2022, Shelley Duvall, Edward Furlong, Chiko Mendez, and Dee Wallace were cast. In December 2022, it was revealed that Felissa Rose, Stacey Nelkin, and Marianne Hagan were cast. The project was crowdfunded, with several rounds of fundraising.

Duvall, who had been retired from acting for 20 years, was initially cast in a cameo similar to "a Friday the 13th Pamela Voorhees type of flashback". Her role was expanded after she expressed interest in performing more scenes, and the project gained attention for her involvement. This included some reshoots after the initial cut of the film was first revealed. It is her final acting role, as she died in 2024. To Entertainment Weekly, Goldberg described Duvall as "an amazing actress to work with, and I will forever be grateful for the opportunity to direct her."

== Release ==
The Forest Hills premiered at Smodcastle Cinemas, a theatre in Atlantic Highlands, New Jersey, on March 11, 2023. It was released on October 4, 2024.

The film gained massive attention because it marked the final acting role of The Shining actress Shelley Duvall, ending her 20-year retirement. Because of her health and physical limitations at the time, much of her work was done remotely or in short sequences. After the initial early screenings, the team managed to film additional sequences and flesh out her role more, making the "Festival Cut" substantially different from that first rushed edit.

== Reception ==
Cody Hamman of JoBlo.com gave the film a rating of 6 out of 10. "I was impressed by Mendez, had fun spotting familiar faces in the supporting cast, and loved seeing Duvall again. I can’t say I found The Forest Hills to be an ideal viewing experience. Trippy, scattered, 'is this real or not?' movies just aren’t for me, so this isn’t the sort of movie I would turn to for entertainment. I’m glad I saw it once, but it’s not something I could watch multiple times."

In his review on Bloody Disgusting, Paul Lê rated it with 1.5/5 skulls saying it is "a confusing psychological werewolf movie (...) This feels more like an endurance test than a movie, and not in a rewarding way either."
