= Frankenweenie (1984 film) =

1984 film by Tim Burton

- Home video release poster
- Directed by: Tim Burton
- Screenplay by: Lenny Ripps
- Story by: Tim Burton
- Produced by: Julie Hickson
- Starring: Shelley Duvall; Daniel Stern; Barret Oliver
- Cinematography: Thomas E. Ackerman
- Edited by: Ernest Milano
- Music by: Michael Convertino; David Newman
- Production company: Walt Disney Pictures
- Distributed by: Buena Vista Distribution
- Release date: December 14, 1984
- Running time: 29 minutes
- Country: United States
- Language: English
- Budget: $1 million

Frankenweenie is a 1984 American science fiction comedy horror featurette directed by Tim Burton and written by him and Leonard Ripps. It is both a parody of, and homage to, the 1931 film Frankenstein based on Mary Shelley's 1818 novel Frankenstein; or, The Modern Prometheus. Burton later directed a feature-length stop-motion animated remake, released in 2012.

== Plot ==
Victor Frankenstein is a young boy who creates movies starring his pet Bull Terrier Sparky. After Sparky is hit by a car and killed, Victor learns at school about electrical impulses in muscles and is inspired to bring his pet back to life. He creates elaborate machines in his attic which brings down a bolt of lightning that revives the dog. Victor is pleased, but one day Sparky sneaks out of the house and frightens the Frankensteins' neighbors. Although they do not get a clear look at Sparky, they determine that some sort of creature is dwelling in the Frankenstein home and grow suspicious of the family. Victor's parents discover the revived Sparky, and eventually decide to introduce him to the neighbors in order to quell their suspicions and rumors. However, the arranged introduction ends in chaos as the neighbors recognize Sparky as the creature and fly into a panic.

Sparky runs away, with Victor in pursuit. They find themselves at an abandoned miniature golf course and hide in its flagship windmill. The Frankensteins' neighbors, now an angry mob, arrive on the scene, and when they attempt to use a cigarette lighter to try to see into the windmill, it is accidentally set on fire. Victor falls and is knocked out, but Sparky rescues him from the flames, only to be crushed by the burning windmill. The neighbors, realizing their error, use their cars and jumper cables to "recharge" Sparky. He is revived, and all celebrate. Sparky falls in love with a poodle whose fur bears a strong resemblance to the hairdo of the Bride of Frankenstein.

== Cast ==
- Barret Oliver as Victor Frankenstein, a young boy expert in science who is sad after his dog's death.
- Shelley Duvall as Susan Frankenstein, Victor's mother.
- Daniel Stern as Ben Frankenstein, Victor's father.
- Joseph Maher as Mr. Chambers
- Roz Braverman as Mrs. Epstein
- Paul Bartel as Mr. Walsh
- Sofia Coppola as Anne Chambers
- Jason Hervey as Frank Dale
- Paul C. Scott as Mike Anderson
- Helen Boll as Mrs. Curtis
- Rusty James as Raymond
- Sparky as Himself: Victor's dog. He dies and gets reanimated by Victor.

== Home media ==
In addition to having its own 1992 VHS release, this short was included in the Special Edition, Collector's Edition, and Blu-ray 3D releases of The Nightmare Before Christmas and on the Blu-ray release of its remake.

== Controversy ==
Burton was fired by Disney after the short was completed, as the studio claimed that he had been wasting company resources and felt the film was not suitable for the targeted young audiences. The short was originally planned to be released alongside the summer re-release of The Jungle Book, but its release was rescheduled with the Christmas re-release of Pinocchio on December 21, 1984. Although the film was subsequently shelved, the short played in UK cinemas in 1985 in front of Touchstone Films' Baby: Secret of the Lost Legend. Following the success of Burton's later films Pee-wee's Big Adventure, Beetlejuice, Batman, and Edward Scissorhands, the short was given a home video release in 1992. It was released as an extra, along with Vincent, on The Nightmare Before Christmas DVD, Blu-ray and UMD, as well as the 2000 VHS.

== Remake ==
Disney and Tim Burton produced a full-length remake using stop motion animation, which was released on October 5, 2012 in Disney Digital 3D and IMAX 3D. The original film is included as a bonus feature on the Blu-ray home video release.
