= Roxanne (film) =

1987 film by Fred Schepisi

- Theatrical release poster
- Directed by: Fred Schepisi
- Screenplay by: Steve Martin
- Based on: Cyrano de Bergerac by Edmond Rostand
- Produced by: Michael I. Rachmil; Daniel Melnick
- Starring: Steve Martin; Daryl Hannah; Shelley Duvall; Rick Rossovich; Fred Willard; Michael J. Pollard
- Cinematography: Ian Baker
- Edited by: John Scott
- Music by: Bruce Smeaton
- Distributed by: Columbia Pictures
- Release dates: June 18, 1987 (Premiere); June 19, 1987 (United States)
- Running time: 107 minutes
- Country: United States
- Language: English
- Budget: $12 million
- Box office: $40.1 million (US and Canada)

Roxanne is a 1987 American romantic comedy film directed by Fred Schepisi and written by and starring Steve Martin. Also starring Daryl Hannah, Rick Rossovich, Shelley Duvall, Fred Willard, and Michael J. Pollard, the film is a contemporary adaptation of Edmond Rostand's 1897 play Cyrano de Bergerac. It follows Charlie "C.D." Bales, a witty and well-liked fire chief whose insecurity about his unusually large nose prevents him from expressing his feelings for Roxanne Kowalski, a visiting astronomy student.

Martin developed the project after years of admiring earlier adaptations of Cyrano de Bergerac and spent several years writing the screenplay. Filming took place during the summer of 1986 in Nelson, British Columbia, which served as the setting for the fictional small town depicted in the film. To portray C.D., Martin wore prosthetic nose makeup that required extensive daily application.

Released by Columbia Pictures in June 1987, Roxanne was a commercial success, grossing over $40 million in the United States and Canada. The film received generally favorable reviews from critics, with particular praise directed toward Martin's screenplay and performance. For his work, Martin received a Golden Globe nomination for Best Actor and won Best Actor from both the Los Angeles Film Critics Association and the National Society of Film Critics. Martin also won the Writers Guild of America Award for Best Screenplay.

== Plot ==
Charlie "C.D." Bales is the intelligent, witty, charismatic, and athletic fire chief of the small town of Nelson, where he is well-liked by the town residents. Nevertheless, he is sensitive about his abnormally large nose, which most of the town knows not to mention in front of him. When the beautiful Roxanne Kowalski, an astronomy PhD student, arrives to stay in town over the summer while searching for a passing comet, he and many others are drawn to her. However, he believes she would never be attracted to him because of his nose. Though Roxanne adores him as a friend, she is physically attracted to Chris McConnell, a handsome but dimwitted fireman newly recruited into C.D.'s bumbling and slow-learning team.

After seeing Chris buy a book by philosopher Jean-Paul Sartre for a friend, Roxanne assumes he is deeply intelligent and asks C.D. to approach him on her behalf. When Chris hears of her interest, he feels ill as women intimidate him. He tries to write her a letter, but takes all day with little result. He then convinces C.D. to write it with prose that successfully woos Roxanne. When told Roxanne wants to meet up, a nerve-wracked Chris insists C.D. help him seem equally brilliant in person. He arrives at Roxanne's wearing concealed earphones that relay C.D.'s words. When the equipment fails, Chris bungles it by objectifying Roxanne, and she furiously ends their date. He begs C.D. for help, and, as Chris is unable to relay what C.D. prompts him to say, C.D. hides behind a tree and confesses his true feelings of love for Roxanne while pretending to be Chris. His words touch Roxanne, and she invites Chris inside her home to have sex, much to C.D.'s chagrin.

Roxanne goes out of town for a week and leaves her hotel address with C.D. so Chris can write to her. Instead of telling Chris, C D. writes her three times a day, each letter more impactfully romantic than the last. Meanwhile, Chris and local bartender Sandy begin flirting. While writing a new letter, C.D.'s god sister and close friend Dixie encourages him to tell Roxanne he loves her. Upon learning that Roxanne has returned early, C.D. rushes to warn Chris that she may mention the letters, leaving behind his new letter, which Dixie reads. Roxanne tries and fails to get Chris to be the man in the letters, revealing his looks are secondary for her. Feeling ill and believing his looks are all he has, he runs out, leaving her confused. Chris leaves town with Sandy for Tahoe, writing Roxanne a breakup letter.

C.D. visits Roxanne, who reveals she knows the truth: Dixie delivered C.D.'s final letter with a note revealing him as the author, and Roxanne compared the handwriting with Chris's poorly-written letter. Furious that C.D. misled and tricked her, she punches him in the nose and throws him out. Before he can say more, he is distracted by his extra-keen sense of smell detecting a fire. He alerts his team and leads them to a large fire, which they successfully extinguish.

While resting on his roof, C.D. hears Roxanne reciting his words to him. She tells C.D. that it was his words that she fell in love with, which made her feel romantic, intelligent, and feminine, and it is C.D. she truly loves. C.D. stylishly descends from the roof, and they kiss before retiring inside his home. To C.D.'s delight, she tells him she named the comet Charlie, but reveals it is named after her father.

== Cast ==
- Steve Martin as Charlie "C.D." Bales
- Daryl Hannah as Roxanne Kowalski
- Rick Rossovich as Chris McConnell
- Shelley Duvall as Dixie
- John Kapelos as Chuck
- Fred Willard as Mayor Deebs
- Max Alexander as Dean
- Michael J. Pollard as Andy
- Steve Mittleman as Ralston
- Damon Wayans as Jerry
- Matt Lattanzi as Trent
- Shandra Beri as Sandy
- Jean Sincere as Nina
- Thom Curley as Jim
- Ritch Shydner and Kevin Nealon as Drunk #1 and #2
- Brian George as Dave (cosmetic surgeon)
- Maureen Murphy as cosmetics clerk
- Heidi Sorenson as Trudy (Mayor's love interest)

== Production ==
Steve Martin had always been a fan of the José Ferrer version of Cyrano de Bergerac:

I remember just thinking it was the greatest thing I ever saw. I think it's because the character is so strong. He's like a very smart version of what, coincidentally, is popular in movies today. He's smarter than everybody else, quicker than everybody else, wittier than everybody else and tops everybody. That's what the original Cyrano is like. And this just sort of takes that vicious edge off it.

In the early-1980s Martin had the idea of updating the play, only with the difference that Cyrano would get the girl in the end. He decided to write the screenplay himself, writing 25 drafts over three years. The film was greenlit at Columbia by then-production chief Guy McElwaine. He was replaced by David Puttnam who liked the script, continued the studio's support and suggested the casting of Daryl Hannah. It was the first film released under Puttnam's auspices at Columbia.

Roxanne was filmed in the summer of 1986 in the town of Nelson, British Columbia. Steve Martin chose to use the local fire hall on Ward Street as a primary set. Although the movie has references to the town's name being "Nelson", it is portrayed as being in the USA. The mailboxes which figure in the plot are USPS blue, not Canada Post red. In the bar scenes, neon signs for Miller beer show the advertising slogan of the time: "Made the American Way", which was not used in Canada. There is also a scene which shows the fire truck to have a Washington license plate, which complements an earlier scene in which Martin's character makes a reference to Seattle. Martin's nose makeup took 90 minutes to apply every day and two minutes to take off. "God how I hated that thing", he said.

== Release ==
Roxanne had 780 to 790 advertised sneak previews over the weekend of June 12, 1987. The film was originally due to be released the following weekend on 1,100 screens but, following the performance of the sneak previews, it was decided to reduce the screen count to try to increase the average gross per-screen. The film had its official world premiere on June 18, 1987. It opened the following day on 847 screens in the United States and Canada.

== Reception ==
=== Critical response ===
Roxanne received an 88% approval rating on Rotten Tomatoes based on 43 reviews, with the consensus being: "Though its sweetness borders on sappiness, Roxanne is an unabashedly romantic comedy that remains one of Steve Martin's funniest". Metacritic gave film a score of 73 based on 19 reviews, indicating "generally favorable reviews". Roger Ebert hailed the film as a "gentle, whimsical comedy", giving it three and half stars of four, also stating: "What makes "Roxanne" so wonderful is not this fairly straightforward comedy, however, but the way the movie creates a certain ineffable spirit".

=== Box office ===
The film opened in fifth place at the US box office with an opening weekend gross of $4.6 million. It grossed $40.1 million in the United States and Canada.

=== Accolades ===
It has also won and has been nominated for a number of awards, including:

- Golden Globe Award: Nominated: Best Performance by an Actor in a Motion Picture – Comedy/Musical: Steve Martin
- LAFCA Award: Won (Tied): Best Actor: Steve Martin (Tied with Jack Nicholson for Ironweed (1987) and The Witches of Eastwick (1987).)
- NSFC Award: Won: Best Actor: Steve Martin
- WGA Award (Screen): Won: Best Screenplay Based on Material from Another Medium: Steve Martin

== References to the play ==
- The historical Cyrano de Bergerac wrote of a journey to the Moon and to the Sun, and Roxanne alludes to this in a scene where Bales jokes about UFOs and aliens. Additionally, that scene mirrors one in the play where Cyrano pretends to fall out of a tree to distract another wooer of Roxanne.
- The names of all three main characters are based on their counterparts in the play. C.D. Bales has the same initials as Cyrano de Bergerac, Roxanne's name is a slight alteration of Roxane, and Chris is a shortened form of Christian.
- The string of nose-based insults that C.D. reels off in the bar parallels one that Cyrano delivers to Valvert in Act I of the play, and even paraphrases a portion of it:

Cyrano: "Oh, how you must love the little birds so much that when they come and sing to you, you give them this to perch on."
C.D.: "You must love the little birdies to give them this to perch on."

- C.D.'s position in the firefighters is similar to Cyrano's leadership of the Gascon Cadets.
