= Booker (film) =

- VHS artwork
- Screenplay by: John Allman; Charles Eric Johnson
- Directed by: Stan Lathan
- Starring: Shavar Ross; CCH Pounder; Thalmus Rasulala; James Bond III; Shelley Duvall; Judge Reinhold
- Composer: Webster Lewis
- Country of origin: United States
- Original language: English

Production
- Executive producer: Avon Kirkland
- Producer: Whitney Green
- Cinematography: John Else; Ashley James
- Editor: Stephen Stept
- Running time: 56 minutes
- Production company: New Images Productions

Original release
- Network: Disney Channel
- Release: October 1, 1984

Booker is a 1984 American biographical short television film directed by Stan Lathan, and starring Shavar Ross, CCH Pounder, Thalmus Rasulala, Shelley Duvall, and Judge Reinhold. Its plot follows the early life of civil rights activist Booker T. Washington. The film first screened on the Disney Channel on October 1, 1984.

== Cast ==
- Shavar Ross as Booker T. Washington
- CCH Pounder as Jane
- Thalmus Rasulala as Wash
- James Bond III as John
- Shelley Duvall as Laura Burroughs
- Judge Reinhold as Newt Burroughs
- Julius Harris as Lee
- LeVar Burton as William Davis
- Mel Stewart as Reverend Rice
- Marian Mercer as Mrs. Ruffner
- Jim Haynie as Wheeler

== Reception ==
Booker was named to the ALA Notable Children's Videos list in 1984.
