= Dan Gilroy (musician) =

American singer (born 1947)

- Born: May 19, 1947 (age 79); New York City, U.S.
- Occupations: Singer, musician
- Instruments: Vocals, guitar
- Years active: 1979–present
- Formerly of: Breakfast Club
- Partner(s): Madonna (1979–1980); Shelley Duvall (1989–2024; her death)

Daniel Alan Gilroy (born May 19, 1947) is an American musician best known as the former lead singer of the group Breakfast Club. Following Breakfast Club, he acted in the children's programs Mother Goose Rock 'n' Rhyme and Mrs. Piggle-Wiggle.

== Biography ==
Gilroy met Madonna, then an aspiring dancer, at a party in 1979. They became romantically involved and she moved into the synagogue where Gilroy lived with his brother Ed Gilroy in Corona, Queens. It also served as a studio for the brothers, who at times worked as musicians or comics under the name Bil and Gil. While Gilroy and his brother were waiting tables during the day and performing their comedy routines at night, Madonna was at the synagogue practicing drums. She also began writing songs, Gilroy taught her how to play guitar and they formed the band Breakfast Club. She convinced Gilroy to let her perform her own songs, to which he reluctantly agreed. Madonna promoted the band and they performed local gigs. In 1980, Madonna left Breakfast Club to form the band Emmy and the Emmys.

By the mid-1980s, Breakfast Club consisted of the Gilroy brothers: Dan concentrated on singing, with Ed on guitar. Gary Burke joined the band, playing the bass. Also, Paul Kauk on keyboards, and Stephen Bray on drums. In 1987, Breakfast Club signed a record deal with MCA Records and released the album Breakfast Club. Their single "Right On Track" peaked at No. 7 on the Billboard Hot 100. They recorded a second album that was never released. Their last song was a cover version of the Beatles "Drive My Car", which was included on the soundtrack for the 1988 movie License To Drive.

Gilroy was in a relationship with actress Shelley Duvall from 1989 until her death in 2024. They co-starred in the Disney Channel film Mother Goose Rock 'n' Rhyme (1990). Gilroy also appeared as Pete the Postman in the TV series Mrs. Piggle-Wiggle in 1994.

Gilroy was portrayed by actor Calvin Knie in the 2019 documentary film Madonna and the Breakfast Club.
