= Nightmare Classics =

- Also known as: Shelley Duvall's Nightmare Classics
- Created by: Shelley Duvall
- Starring: Various
- Narrated by: Linda Hunt
- Country of origin: United States
- Original language: English
- No. of seasons: 1
- No. of episodes: 4

Production
- Executive producer: Shelley Duvall
- Running time: 60 minutes

Original release
- Network: Showtime
- Release: August 12 – November 26, 1989

Related
- Tall Tales & Legends; Faerie Tale Theatre

Nightmare Classics (also known as Shelley Duvall's Nightmare Classics) is an American horror anthology television series created, produced and executive produced by Shelley Duvall featuring adaptations of well-known horror stories by authors including Henry James, Sheridan Le Fanu, Robert Louis Stevenson and Ambrose Bierce. Following the success of her two previous anthology series – Faerie Tale Theatre and Tall Tales & Legends – both of which were aimed at the elementary-school set, Duvall attempted to branch out to the teen and young adult audience with Nightmare Classics.

== Broadcast ==
Nightmare Classics originally aired on Showtime from August 12 to November 26, 1989. Although planned as a six-episode series, only four were ultimately produced and it was the least successful series that Duvall produced for Showtime.

== Episodes ==
No.	Title	Directed by	Original release date
1	"The Turn of the Screw"	Graeme Clifford	August 12, 1989
A young governess (Amy Irving) on her first assignment at Bly Manor estate is hired to look after two neglected children, who show signs of having been corrupted by the evil influence of the manor's resident ghost (Michael Harris). The governess becomes obsessed with saving the children from what she sees as a mortal threat to their very souls. Cast: Amy Irving, David Hemmings, Micole Mercurio, Olaf Pooley, Balthazar Getty, Michael Harris
2	"Carmilla"	Gabrielle Beaumont	September 10, 1989
Marie (Ione Skye) is a lonely girl living with her overbearing father (Roy Dotrice) on a plantation during the Civil War era. Their placid lives are invaded when they rescue a sole survivor from a carriage wreck: a mysterious woman named Carmilla (Meg Tilly) who is believed to be a vampire when bodies start turning up with two little holes in the side of their necks. Cast: Ione Skye, Meg Tilly, Roy Dotrice, Roddy McDowall, Armelia McQueen, John Doolittle, Lise Marie Russell
3	"The Strange Case of Dr. Jekyll and Mr. Hyde"	Michael Lindsay-Hogg	October 29, 1989
Henry Jekyll (Anthony Andrews), a shy and unassuming doctor, is obsessed with the idea of separating the good from the evil within humans by using the chemical concoctions he made. He is also obviously attracted to Rebecca (Laura Dern), daughter of the head teacher of the medical school he works for, but the timid doctor just cannot say so until he himself drinks the portion to become Mr. Edward Hyde, handsome and confident gentleman whose wish should never be denied. Cast: Anthony Andrews, Nicholas Guest, George Murdock, Laura Dern, Lisa Langlois, Rue McClanahan
4	"The Eyes of the Panther"	Noel Black	November 26, 1989
A crusty Old West hermit (John Stockwell) relates the story of the eerie experiences of a Midwestern pioneer family whose home was invaded by a mysterious panther. In the years that follow, however, an unnatural curse haunts the family's beautiful daughter Irene (Daphne Zuniga), who finds herself answering the call of primordial, inhuman instincts. Cast: C. Thomas Howell, Daphne Zuniga, John Stockwell, Jeb Brown, Ruth de Sosa, Terry Wills, Nancy Parsons

== Home video ==
Following their initial broadcast on Showtime, all four episodes of Nightmare Classics were each released as a stand-alone VHS in 1990 by Cannon Video.

== See also ==
- Faerie Tale Theatre
- Tall Tales & Legends
