= Tall Tales & Legends =

- Also known as: Shelley Duvall's Tall Tales & Legends
- Genre: Anthology; Adventure; Comedy drama
- Created by: Shelley Duvall
- Presented by: Shelley Duvall
- Starring: see below
- Country of origin: United States
- Original language: English
- No. of seasons: 1
- No. of episodes: 9

Production
- Executive producers: Shelley Duvall for Gaylord Production Company; Frederic S. Fuchs
- Running time: 48–54 minutes

Original release
- Network: Showtime
- Release: September 25, 1985 – December 24, 1986

Related
- Faerie Tale Theatre; Nightmare Classics

Tall Tales & Legends (also known as Shelley Duvall's Tall Tales & Legends) is an American folklore anthology television series of 9 episodes created by television and film actress Shelley Duvall, who also served as executive producer and presenter, alongside Fred Fuchs, following her success with her first anthology series, Faerie Tale Theatre.

Adapting various American-based folk tales and stories of bravery, the series ran from 1985–1987 on Showtime, as well as the Disney Channel. The series was nominated for a Primetime Emmy Award. It was succeeded by a four-part anthology series, titled Nightmare Classics.

== Episodes ==
No.	Topic/Title	Directed by	Written by	Original release date
1	The Legend of Sleepy Hollow	Edd Griles	Story by : Washington Irving; Teleplay by : Lon O'Kun	September 25, 1985
Timid schoolteacher Ichabod Crane (Ed Begley Jr.) faces a headless horseman one dark Halloween night. Co-starring: Beverly D'Angelo as Katrina Van Tassel, Charles Durning as Uncle Duffue/Narrator, Tim Thomerson as Brom Bones, Barret Oliver as Heinrich Van Tassel, Diana Bellamy as Mrs. Van Tassel
2	Pecos Bill	Howard Storm	Alister Berry; Nancy Steen; Neil Thompson	January 1, 1986
Raised by coyotes, Pecos Bill (Steve Guttenberg) grows up to be the cowboy who puts the "wild" in the Wild West. His daring adventure to save the state of Texas from drought proves that acts of selflessness and bravery are never forgotten. Co-starring: Rebecca De Mornay as Rose Peasley (Slue-Foot Sue), Martin Mull as Gov. Ambrose Peasley, Peter Billingsley as Kevin, Dick Schaal as Bob Watkins, Elizabeth Gorcey as Pansy Peasley, Megan Mullally as Posy Peasley, Claude Akins as Grandfather/Narrator
3	Casey at the Bat	David Steinberg	Teleplay by : Andy Borowitz; Poem by : Ernest Lawrence Thayer	January 20, 1986
Down-on-his-luck baseball player Casey Frank (Elliott Gould) follows his dreams to become the biggest star in the game. Co-starring: Carol Kane as Barbara Dent, Hamilton Camp as Undercrawl, Rae Dawn Chong as Circe Lafemme, Bill Macy as Pop Gumm, Mina Kolb as Widow Bleacher, Charles Gray as Mr. Dent, Howard Cosell as Ernie/Narrator, Bob Uecker as Joe
4	Darlin' Clementine	Jerry London	Nancy Sackett	February 8, 1986
Clementine (Shelley Duvall) is the sole woman in her mining camp who cares for everyone around her until her selfish father (Ed Asner) learns a valuable lesson. Co-starring: David Dukes as Levi, Gordon Jump as Mr. Ripple, Michael Richards as Sneaky Pete, Randy Newman as Narrator
5	Johnny Appleseed	Christopher Guest	Mark Curtiss; Rod Ash	October 31, 1986
Johnny Appleseed (Martin Short) travels across the land with a cooking pot on his head and pockets filled with apple seeds and shows that there is nothing wrong with being different. Co-starring: Rob Reiner as Jack Smith, Molly Ringwald as Jenny Smith, Michael McKean as Mac Macintosh, Lewis Arquette as Jimbo Smith/Narrator, Anne Jackson as Betty Nature, Will Sampson as Chief
6	Ponce De Leon and the Search for the Fountain of Youth	Sheldon Larry	Mark Curtiss; Rod Ash	November 16, 1986
The famed Spanish explorer (Michael York) goes on his famous quest to discover the legendary "Fountain of Youth", which is botched by the actions of Lucy the Pirate (Sally Kellerman). With a little help and guidance from the "Mysterious Stranger" (Dr. Ruth Westheimer; Dr. Ruth), the two learn that eternal youth is not all it is cracked up to be. Co-starring: Paul Rodriguez as Julio, Edward Duke as Rudolpho, Lewis Arquette as George, Fisher Stevens as Indian chief, Charles Fleischer as Balboa, Warren Berlinger as Herb/Narrator
7	John Henry	Ray Danton	Samm-Art Williams	December 1, 1986
Former slave John Henry (Danny Glover) stands up to his boss (Barry Corbin) and his new steam drill. Vowing not to be replaced by a machine, Henry challenges the drill to a one-on-one competition. Co-starring: Tom Hulce as Quinn/Narrator, Lynn Whitfield as Pollie Ann, Lou Rawls as Jim Wallace, Thelma Houston as Edna Wallace, James Louis Watkins as Spike Wade
8	Davy Crockett	David Grossman	Susan Denim; Jack Carrerow; Lisa A. Bannick	December 18, 1986
Junior high teacher Mr. Wallace (Michael McKean) gives bored delinquent Ben Parker (Adam Carl) a magical book, which takes him back in time to the open 1820s American frontier, where Davy Crockett (Mac Davis) earns a reputation for bravery and courage, proving that anything is possible. Co-starring: McLean Stevenson as Andrew Jackson, Jennifer Joan Taylor as Polly, Daniel Davis as Congressman, Mimi Kennedy as Mrs. Parker, Gino De Mauro as Whitey
9	Annie Oakley	Michael Lindsay-Hogg	Pamela Pettler	December 24, 1986
Young Phoebe Mosey (Jamie Lee Curtis) defies expectations and proves herself to become "Little Miss Sure Shot" Annie Oakley, the legendary sharpshooter and "Wild West" icon. Co-starring: Brian Dennehy as Buffalo Bill, Cliff DeYoung as Frank Butler/Jim Oakley, Nancy Lenehan as Lyda, Lu Leonard as Queen Victoria, Joyce Van Patten as Ma, Nick Romus as Sitting Bull

== Home media ==
Several episodes were issued on VHS by CBS/Fox Video in the 1980s. Lyrick Studios made it a nine video series on VHS in 1998. Koch Entertainment issued the entire series on DVD in 2005. The episodes were available as separate DVDs or together as a nine-disc box set. The complete series was issued again, this time in a three-DVD set, by E1 Entertainment in 2009.
