= Mother Goose Rock 'n' Rhyme =

1990 television film

- Promotional poster
- Genre: Adventure; Family; Fantasy; Musical; Mystery
- Written by: Mark Curtiss
- Story by: Linda Engelsiepen; Harry Hinkle
- Directed by: Jeff Stein
- Starring: Harry Anderson; Brian Bonsall; Elayne Boosler; Bobby Brown; Shelley Duvall; Art Garfunkel; Teri Garr; Dan Gilroy; Woody Harrelson; Debbie Harry; Cyndi Lauper; David Leisure; Little Richard; Los Trios; Howie Mandel; Cheech Marin; Van Dyke Parks; Katey Sagal; John Santucci; Garry Shandling; Paul Simon; Jean Stapleton; Stray Cats; Ben Vereen; ZZ Top; Pia Zadora
- Music by: Van Dyke Parks
- Country of origin: United States
- Original language: English

Production
- Producer: Thomas A. Bliss
- Cinematography: Tony Mitchell
- Editor: Christopher Willoughby
- Running time: 96 minutes
- Production companies: Hi-Tops Video; Think Entertainment

Original release
- Network: Disney Channel
- Release: May 19, 1990

Mother Goose Rock 'n' Rhyme (also known as Shelley Duvall's Mother Goose Rock 'n' Rhyme or Shelley Duvall's Rock in Rhymeland) is a 1990 American musical television film that aired on the Disney Channel. The film stars Shelley Duvall as Little Bo Peep and Dan Gilroy as Gordon Goose, the son of Mother Goose, along with a supporting cast of actors and musicians portraying a wide range of characters, mostly of Mother Goose nursery rhyme fame.

The film won its production company, Think Entertainment, a Peabody Award and an Emmy Award for Patricia Field.

== Plot ==
Gordon Goose, the son of Mother Goose, is unhappy that he must live in Rhymeland, as he does not fit in with its denizens "Rhymies" and views them as too weird and strange for his liking. On his way to work in the family's store, Gordon comes across Little Bo Peep, who informs him that Mother Goose has gone missing along with Bo Peep's sheep. The two go on a journey to find hints as to her location, in the process discovering that several other Rhymies have also gone missing. They ultimately discover that Mother Goose was abducted by Michael, an 8-year-old child from the real world who plucked her out of his nursery rhyme book. They convince Michael to return them to Rhymeland, as her absence has caused all of the rhymes to disappear.

Once back in Rhymeland, Mother Goose reveals that not only is Gordon a Rhymie, that he is actually the first Rhymie. She kept this a secret from both Gordon and others, as the rhyme was not very good. Gordon asks Bo Peep if she wants help looking for her sheep. The two set out arm in arm, with Gordon now joyfully taking part in Rhymeland's antics.

== Cast ==
- Harry Anderson as Peter Piper
- Brian Bonsall as Michael
- Elayne Boosler as Old Mother Hubbard
- Bobby Brown as Three Blind Mice
- Shelley Duvall as Little Bo Peep
- Art Garfunkel as Georgie Porgie
- Teri Garr as Jill (of Jack and Jill)
- Dan Gilroy as Gordon Goose
- Woody Harrelson as Lou the Lamb (of Mary Had a Little Lamb)
- Debbie Harry as The Old Woman Who Lived in a Shoe
- Cyndi Lauper as Mary (of Mary Had a Little Lamb)
- David Leisure as The Newscaster/The Game Show Host
- Little Richard as Old King Cole
- Los Trios (Stephen Kearney & Neill Gladwin) as The Crooked Man & His Dog/Happy 1 & 2
- Howie Mandel as Humpty Dumpty
- Cheech Marin as The Carnival Barker
- Van Dyke Parks as The Minister of Merriment
- Katey Sagal as Mary, Mary, Quite Contrary
- John Santucci as All the King's Men (of Humpty Dumpty)
- Garry Shandling as Jack (of Jack and Jill)
- Paul Simon as Simple Simon
- Jean Stapleton as Mother Goose
- Stray Cats (Brian Setzer, Lee Rocker & Slim Jim Phantom) as Georgie Porgie's House Band
- Ben Vereen as The Itsy Bitsy Spider
- ZZ Top (Billy Gibbons, Joe Hill & Frank Beard) as Three Men in a Tub
- Pia Zadora as Little Miss Muffet

Special guest appearances

- Vance Colvig Jr.
- Paul Daniels
- The Del Rubio Triplets
- Warren DeMartini, Dweezil Zappa, Randy Jackson & Stephen Bray as The Metal Band, "The Dank"
- Jennifer Evans
- Seymour Heller

== Production ==
The script for Mother Goose Rock 'n' Rhyme was written by Mark Curtiss and Rod Ash, based on a story by Hilary Hinkle and Linda Engelsiepen. Jeff Stein was brought on to direct and Shelley Duvall, who also produced, was cast as Little Bo-Peep. Filming took place over 21 days at a warehouse repurposed for filming. The film had a budget of $2.5 million and starred Jean Stapleton, Dan Gilroy, and several musical bands and artists. Of the film, Duvall stated that she wanted it to appeal to both adults and children, and that she did not want to condescend to younger viewers.

The sets were designed by songwriter and visual artist Allee Willis who was also known for creating unique works for music videos for artists like Debbie Harry, Heart, and MTV's show Just Say Julie.

The film marked the first time that Duvall and her co-star Dan Gilroy met; the two would later go on to marry.

== Release ==
Mother Goose Rock 'n' Rhyme premiered on the Disney Channel on May 19, 1990, followed by a release on VHS later that same year.

== Reception ==
Critical reception upon its release was favorable. Lee Winfrey of the Knight-Ridder Tribune News praised the film as a "cheerful, colorful television show" and cited Little Richard's musical number as their favorite part. It also received praise from Nanciann Cherry of The Blade, who compared it to a music video and stated that it was "all done with a good spirit and deft touch". Martin F. Kohn of the Detroit Free Press was more critical, noting that the film had high spots and the plot was "serviceable, if not extraordinary" while also stating that young viewers may not appreciate all of the show's jokes.

Ron Weiskind of the Pittsburgh Post-Gazette commented upon Mother Goose Rock 'n' Rhyme's humor, questioning who was the target audience, as it could bore younger viewers and that some of the humor and allusions were targeted more for adults.

=== Awards ===
- Peabody Award (1990, winner - Think Entertainment)
- Emmy Award for Outstanding Costume Design For A Variety Or Music Program (1990, won - Patricia Field)
