= An American Tail (franchise) =

Media franchise based around the 1986 movie

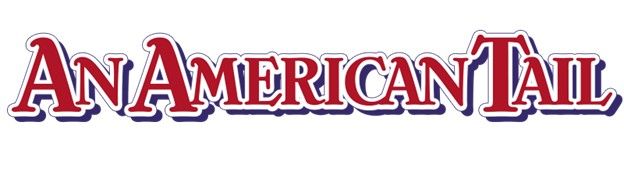
- Official franchise logo
- Created by: Don Bluth; David Kirschner; Judy Freudberg; Tony Geiss
- Original work: An American Tail (1986)
- Owners: Universal Pictures; Amblin Entertainment
- Years: 1986–1999

Games
- Video games: An American Tail: The Computer Adventures of Fievel and His Friends (1992); An American Tail: Fievel Goes West (1994); An American Tail: Fievel's Gold Rush (2002)

Audio
- Soundtracks: An American Tail; An American Tail: Fievel Goes West

Miscellaneous
- Theme park attraction: An American Tail Theatre

An American Tail is a children's film franchise based on the 1986 animated feature film of the same name directed by Don Bluth and produced by Sullivan Bluth Studios/Amblin Entertainment.

The franchise follows the adventures of Fievel Mousekewitz, a baby Russian-Jewish mouse immigrant to the United States in 1885. The franchise opened up several attractions at Universal Studios Hollywood and Universal Studios Florida including "Fievel's Playland" and "An American Tail Show".

Following the two films produced with Spielberg's involvement, Universal Pictures continued the franchise with two direct-to-video sequels, An American Tail: The Treasure of Manhattan Island and An American Tail: The Mystery of the Night Monster. All four American Tail films were released on a combination pack DVD released on June 13, 2017.

== Films ==
Film	U.S. release date	Director(s)	Screenwriter(s)	Story by	Producer(s)
An American Tail	November 21, 1986	Don Bluth	Judy Freudberg & Tony Geiss	David Kirschner and Judy Freudberg & Tony Geiss	Don Bluth, Gary Goldman and John Pomeroy
An American Tail: Fievel Goes West	November 22, 1991	Phil Nibbelink & Simon Wells	Flint Dille	Charles Swenson	Steven Spielberg and Robert Watts
An American Tail: The Treasure of Manhattan Island	February 15, 2000	Larry Latham	Len Uhley	Len Uhley	Larry Latham
An American Tail: The Mystery of the Night Monster	July 25, 2000	Larry Latham	Len Uhley	Len Uhley	Larry Latham

=== An American Tail (1986) ===
An American Tail is the original 1986 film which follows Fievel and his family as they immigrate from Russia to the United States and how he subsequently gets lost and aims to reunite with them.

=== An American Tail: Fievel Goes West (1991) ===
An American Tail: Fievel Goes West is a 1991 western sequel to An American Tail. This film has been exhibited four times at the Jimmy Stewart Museum since 2015, a dedication to the late James Stewart in his final role.

=== An American Tail: The Treasure of Manhattan Island (1998) ===
An American Tail: The Treasure of Manhattan Island is a 1998 direct-to-video sequel not involved with Amblin Entertainment and is noted for exploring darker themes unlike the past films. Released in the United States in February 2000.

=== An American Tail: The Mystery of the Night Monster (1999) ===
An American Tail: The Mystery of the Night Monster is a 1999 direct-to-video sequel not involved by Amblin Entertainment, released in the United States in July 2000. The film series was subsequently discontinued to focus work on direct-to-video sequels based on Balto.

== Television ==
Series	Season(s)	Episodes	Originally released			Showrunner	Executive producer	Status
Series	Season(s)	Episodes	First released	Last released	Network	Showrunner	Executive producer	Status
Fievel's American Tails	1	13	September 12, 1992	December 5, 1992	CBS	David Kirschner	Steven Spielberg	Ended

Fievel's American Tails is a 1992 spin-off TV series and continuation of An American Tail: Fievel Goes West. This series remained abandoned after the release of the direct-to-video sequels until NBCUniversal regained rights to the series in 2020 and was available on Peacock until its removal in 2025.

== Cast and characters ==
List indicator

This section includes characters who will appear or have appeared in more than two films in the series.

- An empty grey cell indicates the character was not in the film, or that the character's official presence has not yet been confirmed.
- ^{S} indicates an appearance as a character's singing voice.

Characters	Films				Television
Characters	An American Tail	An American Tail: Fievel Goes West	An American Tail: The Treasure of Manhattan Island	An American Tail: The Mystery of the Night Monster	Fievel's American Tails
Characters	1986	1991	1998	1999	1992
Fievel Mousekewitz	Phillip Glasser	Phillip Glasser	Thomas Dekker	Thomas Dekker	Phillip Glasser
Tanya Mousekewitz	Amy Green Betsy Cathcart^{S}	Cathy Cavadini	Lacey Chabert	Lacey Chabert	Cathy Cavadini
Papa Mousekewitz	Nehemiah Persoff	Nehemiah Persoff	Nehemiah Persoff	Nehemiah Persoff	Lloyd Battista
Mama Mouskewitz	Erica Yohn	Erica Yohn	Erica Yohn	Jane Singer	Susan Silo
Tiger	Dom DeLuise	Dom DeLuise	Dom DeLuise	Dom DeLuise	Dom DeLuise
Tony Toponi	Pat Musick	Silent cameo	Pat Musick	Pat Musick	
Bridget	Cathianne Blore	Silent cameo			
Honest John	Neil Ross	Silent cameo			
Henri	Christopher Plummer		Silent cameo		
Warren T. Cat	John Finnegan				
Digit	Will Ryan				
Gussie Mausheimer	Madeline Kahn				
Wylie Burp		James Stewart			
Cat R. Waul		John Cleese			Gerrit Graham
T.R. Chula		Jon Lovitz			Dan Castellaneta
Miss Kitty		Amy Irving			Cynthia Ferrer
Cholena			Elaine Bilstad Leeza Miller^{S}		
Chief Wulisso			David Carradine		
Dr. Dithering			René Auberjonois		
Mr. Grasping			Ron Perlman		
Scuttlebutt			John Kassir		
Police Chief McBrusque			Sherman Howard		
Nellie Brie				Susan Boyd	
Madame Mousey				Candi Milo	
Reed Daley				Robert Hays	
Twitch				John Mariano	
Slug				Jeff Bennett	
Lone Woof				John Garry	
Sweet William		Silent cameo			Kenneth Mars

== Production ==
Film	Crew				
Film	Composer(s)	Editor(s)	Production companies	Distributing company	
An American Tail	James Horner	Dan Molina	Universal Pictures, Amblin Entertainment, Sullivan Bluth Studios	Universal Pictures	1 hr 21 mins
An American Tail: Fievel Goes West	James Horner	Nick Fletcher	Universal Pictures, Amblin Entertainment, Amblimation	Universal Pictures	1 hr 15 mins
Fievel's American Tails	Hank Saroyan & Robert Irving and Milan Kymlicka	Rob Kirkpatrick	Universal Cartoon Studios, Amblin Television, Nelvana Studios	Columbia Broadcasting System	6 hrs 30 mins (30 mins/episodes)
An American Tail: The Treasure of Manhattan Island	Michael Tavera and James Horner	Jay Bixsen & Danik Thomas	Universal Family & Home Entertainment Productions, Universal Cartoon Studios, TMS-Kyokuichi Corporation	Universal Pictures Home Entertainment	1 hr 19 mins
An American Tail: The Mystery of the Night Monster	Michael Tavera and James Horner	Jay Bixsen	Universal Family & Home Entertainment Productions, Universal Cartoon Studios, Tama Productions	Universal Pictures Home Entertainment	1 hr 18 mins

The character of Fievel Mousekewitz was named after the Yiddish name of Steven Spielberg's grandfather, Philip Posner. Fievel also served as the mascot for Amblimation, Spielberg's short-lived animation studio, and was featured in its production logo.

== Reception ==
Title	Rotten Tomatoes	Metacritic
An American Tail	76% (86 reviews)	38% (7 reviews)
An American Tail: Fievel Goes West	59% (17 reviews)	—N/a
Fievel's American Tails	TBD (4 reviews)	—N/a
An American Tail: The Treasure of Manhattan Island	TBD (3 reviews)	—N/a
An American Tail: The Mystery of the Night Monster	TBD (2 reviews)	—N/a

== In other media ==
=== Video games ===
- An American Tail: The Computer Adventures of Fievel and His Friends (1992): a Microsoft DOS point-and-click adventure game developed by Capstone Software and Manley & Associates, Inc., the plot follows a premise based on An American Tail and An American Tail: Fievel Goes West.
- An American Tail: Fievel Goes West (1994): a Super Nintendo Entertainment System video game developed by Shimada Kikaku and published by Hudson Soft. The plot follows a premise that is based on the film of the same name.
- An American Tail Movie Book (1998): an Interactive storybook for Windows and Macintosh computers developed by Wayforward Technologies and published by Sound Source Interactive.
- An American Tail: Fievel's Gold Rush (2002): a platform game for Game Boy Advance developed by Hokus-Pokus. It received mixed reviews from critics, and was created for younger players.
- An American Tail (2007): a platform game developed by Data Design Interactive and published by Blast! Entertainment, the plot is based on the film of the same name; while the game was released exclusively in Europe. The game consists of ten levels with four bonus levels, where the player must guide Fievel on a preset path from start to finish. Gameplay takes different forms in different levels, where the player controls the main character through mechanics such as running in a bubble, riding the back of Henri the pigeon, parachuting downwards and others while collecting stars or pieces of cheese along the way.

=== Music ===
"Somewhere Out There" (1986): Created as the main theme of An American Tail, the rock and roll ballad version performed by Linda Ronstadt and James Ingram was included in the movie during the end-titles sequence. The song is notable for winning two Academy Awards at the 30th award show, one for Song of the Year and the other for Best Song Written Specifically for a Motion Picture or Television. It was also nominated for Best Pop Performance by a Duo or Group with Vocal for Rondstadt and Ingram. It also earned attention for its nominations for Best Original Song at the 44th Golden Globe Awards and the 59th Academy Awards, respectively.

"Dreams to Dream" (1991): Created as the main theme of An American Tail: Fievel Goes West, the rock ballad version was performed by Linda Ronstadt and debuted during the end-titles sequence of the movie. The song was noted for having a troubled production history. Anita Baker was initially slated to perform the song before dropping out and being replaced by Ronstadt, only for the latter to reject the offer to include her recording in the film. Replaced by Céline Dion, the single was completed and produced for the movie, before producers later requested that Ronstadt's vocal performance be reinserted into the song. Despite its conflicted production, the finished single earned a nomination for Golden Globe Award for Best Original Song, and was on the short-list for the nominations for Academy Award for Best Original Song though it didn't earn a nomination for the latter.

=== Stage ===
An American Tail Theatre is a discontinued live stage show based on An American Tail: Fievel Goes West, running at various Universal Parks & Resorts theme parks from 1990 to 1992.

=== Playground ===
Fievel's Playland is a playground based on An American Tail and Fievel Goes West, to make guests feel like the size of a mouse on oversized objects, and ride on a 200-foot water slide. It ran at Hollywood from 1989 to 1997, and in Florida from July 5, 1992, to January 16, 2023.
