= Fievel's American Tails =

1992 animated television series

- Created by: David Kirschner
- Based on: Characters by: David Kirschner; Judy Freudberg; Tony Geiss
- Directed by: Larry Jacobs
- Voices of: Phillip Glasser; Dom DeLuise; Susan Silo; Lloyd Battista; Cathy Cavadini; Dan Castellaneta; Gerrit Graham; Kenneth Mars
- Theme music composer: Hank Saroyan; Robert Irving
- Composer: Milan Kymlicka
- Countries of origin: United States; Canada
- Original language: English
- No. of seasons: 1
- No. of episodes: 13

Production
- Executive producer: Steven Spielberg (uncredited)
- Producers: Michael Hirsh; Patrick Loubert; Clive A. Smith
- Running time: 23 minutes
- Production companies: Amblin Television; Nelvana; Universal Cartoon Studios

Original release
- Network: CBS
- Release: September 12 – December 5, 1992

Fievel's American Tails is a children's cartoon television series which aired on CBS for one season in 1992. The series was produced by Amblin Television, Nelvana, and Universal Cartoon Studios, and is part of the An American Tail franchise. Fievel's American Tails was a continuation of Fievel's adventures after the film An American Tail: Fievel Goes West.

Phillip Glasser (as Fievel Mousekewitz), Dom DeLuise (as Tiger), and Cathy Cavadini (as Tanya Mousekewitz) were the only actors from the film to reprise their roles from the film. One character (Wylie Burp) was written out of the series due to the retirement of actor James Stewart, while another character (Tony Toponi) was written out of the series to allow Pat Musick take time away to raise her daughter, the now-actress Mae Whitman.

Fievel's American Tails had a focus on promoting reading, and the cartoon often depicted Fievel finding solutions to conflicts by reading books. In the early 1990s, the mouse character Fievel also appeared in public-service messages promoting book-reading that were sponsored by the nonprofit Reading Is Fundamental.

== Characters ==
- Fievel Mousekewitz: The main protagonist, a baby mouse who is always looking for adventures.
- Tanya Mousekewitz: Fievel and Yasha's older sister who has dreams of being a great singer.
- Yasha Mousekewitz: Tanya and Fievel's little sister.
- Papa Mousekewitz: Tanya, Fievel, and Yasha's father, a famous violin maker who always gives his Jewish Russian family wise advice. Papa's real name is Bernard and he is Aunt Sophie's older brother in "Aunt Sophie's Visit".
- Mama Mousekewitz: Tanya, Fievel, and Yasha's mother, a strict, practical, and realistic homemaker who tries to keep her family safe from Cat R. Waul, Chula, and Sweet William's gang.
- Tiger: The goofy, cowardly Orange tabby cat who is Fievel's best friend. Tiger is a vegetarian who often eats fish. Tiger met Fievel and his family in An American Tail. He later moved out west to Green River, Utah with Fievel's family and his girlfriend Miss Kitty in An American Tail: Fievel Goes West.
- Cat R. Waul: The main antagonist, a gentleman-like cat who is Fievel's nemesis.
- T. R. Chula: Cat R. Waul's tarantula sidekick and a caricature of Butch Cassidy.
- Sweet William: An evil outlaw cat who is Fievel's other nemesis.
- Slim and Feloneous: Sweet William's two dim-witted alley cat sidekicks.
- Jack: One of Fievel's school mates from Australia.
- Jorge: Another one of Fievel's school mates.
- Mr. J. M. Schimmel: The ground squirrel who owns the mouse-sized general store in Green River. He is also Sidney's father and is Austrian-American as revealed in "Law and Disorder".
- Clint Mousewood: One of Fievel's heroes and Tanya's one-sided crush. Appearing in "Mail Order Mayhem", he is a caricature of Clint Eastwood.
- Hambone: The dog guard on the train who appears in "The Gift".
- Sidney Schimmel: One of Fievel's more spoiled classmate, he first appears in "Law and Disorder". He is Mr. J. M. Schimmel's son.
- Sophie Mousekewitz: Tanya, Fievel, and Yasha's aunt from Russia. She visits the Mousekewitzs from "Aunt Sophie's Visit". She is also Papa's younger sister and Mama's sister-in-law.
- Dr. Travis T. Hiprocates: A traveling doctor that gave away hiccup sweets. Appearing in "A Case of the Hiccups", he is a caricature of Sigmund Freud.
- Miss Kitty: Tiger's girlfriend who appears in "Law and Disorder" and is a caricature of Dorothy Gibson.
- Mr. Ironside: The school teacher, probably a mole and British-American as revealed in "The Legend of Mouse Hollow".
- Dog: The dog who guards the jail house.
- Lorna Holcombe: A girl in Fievel's class who appears in "A Case of the Hiccups".
- Patty Paris: The baker, she is a caricature of Ona Munson's Belle Watling from Gone with the Wind.

== Cast ==
- Phillip Glasser as Fievel
- Dom DeLuise as Tiger
- Lloyd Battista as Papa, originally voiced by Nehemiah Persoff
- Susan Silo as Mama, originally voiced by Erica Yohn
- Cathy Cavadini as Tanya and Yasha
- Dan Castellaneta as T. R. Chula, Mr. Schimmel, Slim and Felonious. T.R. Chula was voiced by Jon Lovitz in the original film.
- Gerrit Graham as Cat R. Waul. John Cleese was briefly considered to reprise his role as Cat R. Waul from the film but Graham took over the role.
- Kenneth Mars as Sweet William
- Hal Rayle as Clint Mousewood
- Arthur Burghardt as Hambone
- Cynthia Ferrer as Miss Kitty, originally voiced by Amy Irving
- Patricia Parris as Aunt Sophie
- Carlos Carrasco as Jorge
- Alex Dent as Fernando
- Danny Mann as Dog
- Lisa Picotte as Lorna Holcomb
- Paige Gosney as Sidney
- Roland Thomson as Jack

== Episodes ==
=== Series overview ===
| Season | Episodes | Originally released | |
| Season | Episodes | First released | Last released |
|---|---|---|---|
| 1 | 13 | September 12, 1992 | December 5, 1992 |

| No. | Title | Original release date | Prod. code |
|---|---|---|---|
| 1 | "Fievel, the Lonesome Ranger" | September 12, 1992 | AT-01 |
All the mice of the village are going to the Cheese Festival, but Fievel misses the trip. He and Tiger think they're left with the whole town to themselves until the other cats kidnap Tiger. Fievel becomes the Lonesome Ranger to save the day.
| 2 | "Law and Disorder" | September 19, 1992 | AT-02 |
After being late for school again because of being sidetracked by adventures with Tiger, Papa forbids Fievel from seeing Tiger until his homework and chores are done. Meanwhile, Tiger has written to Miss Kitty and told her that he is the town's marshall. Fievel must then help him when Miss Kitty arrives to town to keep up the charade.
| 3 | "Little Mouse on the Prairie" | September 26, 1992 | AT-03 |
Fievel wants to borrow his friend Jack's boomerang and it flies straight into Cat R. Waul's pocket. Fievel, his sisters, and Tiger go to get the boomerang back, but get lost in the desert while doing so. Note: This episode was excluded from the original United States home media releases.
| 4 | "The Gift" | October 3, 1992 | AT-05 |
Papa gives Fievel a violin for a birthday present (instead of a treehouse like he wanted), but the violin breaks and Fievel plans to rebuild it secretly. In the meantime, Papa sets out to build the treehouse his son actually wants, instead of a violin.
| 5 | "A Case of the Hiccups" | October 10, 1992 | AT-08 |
A quack doctor comes to town and persuades Fievel to deliver candies to every mouse. A strange hiccups epidemic takes over the mice, except Fievel. Of course, the quack has the medicine to cure it.
| 6 | "The Legend of Mouse Hollow" | October 17, 1992 | AT-09 |
The school stage play featuring Tanya is getting a big crowd. Fievel is very unhappy for a role he gets, but his role turns out much more significant than he thought when Cat R. Waul kidnaps the teacher, cancels the play, and arranges a singing concert instead.
| 7 | "Babysitting Blues" | October 24, 1992 | AT-10 |
The photographer is coming to town, but Papa and Mama are not ready for a picture (even though Tanya is at music school). They leave Fievel to babysit Yasha and the adventure to avoid cats begins.
| 8 | "The Lost Mother Lode" | October 31, 1992 | AT-11 |
Gold fever is taking over the mice. It is said that the old miner's ghost is guarding the real gold vein. Fievel and Papa go to find it, but Cat R. Waul is trying to fool the mice with a forged treasure map.
| 9 | "A Mouse Known as Zorrowitz" | November 7, 1992 | AT-13 |
The cheese delivery for next winter is coming to town, but Fievel (who is punished for two days) brags that he knows about the matter and T.R. Chula hears it. Cat R. Waul wants to steal the cheese, but a mysterious mouse called Zorrowitz appears to help.
| 10 | "Mail Order Mayhem" | November 14, 1992 | AT-12 |
A mail order catalog tempts many mice and cats. Sweet William orders a "mouse slapper", and this weapon gets mice so afraid that they make a request for the law servant. Meanwhile, Clint Mousewood and Fievel get tough times for the cats.
| 11 | "Aunt Sophie's Visit" | November 21, 1992 | AT-06 |
The mice are going to have a rodeo, but Fievel cannot participate because Aunt Sophie is coming to visit the Mousekewitzes. However, Aunt Sophie turns out to be more straight than expected.
| 12 | "That's What Friends Are For" | November 28, 1992 | AT-04 |
Because of a misunderstanding, Tiger thinks that he cannot be Fievel's best friend anymore. Meanwhile, Cat R. Waul leaves the town and T.R. Chula becomes a friend of Fievel.
| 13 | "Bell the Cats" | December 5, 1992 | AT-07 |
Fievel ties jingle bells to the cats' tails to inform mice where the cats are moving, which is not such a good idea.

== Home media ==
In 1993 and 1994, MCA/Universal Home Video made twelve episodes available on either six VHS video-cassettes, or two Laserdisc volumes. These have been the only home video releases of the cartoon, at least in the United States. In the United Kingdom, 12 episodes were released on six video-cassettes in 1995, but were in a different episode order to the United States; VHS #4 of the UK release features the only episode that has not been released in the United States. Episodes have been released on DVD in France, Germany, and Italy, but not in the United States. In 2020, the series became available for streaming on Peacock; it was removed from Peacock in July, 2025.
