= An American Tail: Fievel Goes West (soundtrack) =

Soundtrack album by James Horner
- Released: November 12, 1991
- Genres: Original soundtrack Film score
- Length: 56:38
- Label: MCA
- Producer: James Horner

James Horner chronology
The Rocketeer (1991)	An American Tail: Fievel Goes West (1991)	Thunderheart (1992)

An American Tail: Fievel Goes West (Music from the Motion Picture Soundtrack) is the soundtrack and score album to the 1991 film An American Tail: Fievel Goes West. The animated Western comedy film, which was the first to be produced by Amblimation, an animation studio and subsidiary of Steven Spielberg's Amblin Entertainment, is the sequel to An American Tail (1986). James Horner who composed music for the first film, returned to score for Fievel Goes West, and also wrote four original songs with Will Jennings. The album featured four songs, with Linda Ronstadt and Cathy Cavadini performing the tracks. The original song "Dreams to Dream" received a nomination for Golden Globe Award for Best Original Song, and was shortlisted for the nomination of Academy Award for Best Original Song, but the track was not nominated.

== Background ==
The album featured four songs: two versions of "Dreams to Dream", "Way Out West" performed by a chorus, and "The Girl You Left Behind" performed by Cathy Cavadini. The film also features the cover of "Rawhide" from the Blues Brothers 1980 film. Songs and themes from the first film: "Somewhere Out There", "Mouses Even Cry", "If Cheese Grew on Trees", "Anything Can Happen in America" and "Fievel's Point of View" were also played in the film, though not included in the soundtrack.

"Dreams to Dream" is based on the short instrumental piece from the first film. In July 1991, Anita Baker was originally attached to sing "Dreams to Dream", but this did not happen. Although Linda Ronstadt originally sang the song, she rejected allowing her voice on it after recording finished; Celine Dion was replaced, and she recorded her vocals while working on her second English-language album. However, Ronstadt then asked for her vocals to be on the track, and the executives thought Dion did not have enough star power. While this resulted in the re-insertion of Ronstadt's voice, Horner's experience with recording the song with Dion led her to singing on a later Horner-composed song, "My Heart Will Go On". Cavadini also sang Tanya's version of "Dreams to Dream".

The score was recorded and performed by the London Symphony Orchestra, at Abbey Road Studios, but they moved the sessions to the location of Culver City, California and performance sessions done by the Hollywood Studio Symphony, with several instruments were used in the score, including xylophones, fiddles, banjos, harmonicas, and array of wood and metal percussion.

== Release history ==
MCA Records released An American Tail: Fievel Goes West (Music from the Motion Picture Soundtrack) on November 12, 1991, in cassettes, CDs and LP record. The album was released in the United States, the United Kingdom, Canada, Germany, Austria, Brazil, Indonesia, Malaysia and Japan under the catalog number 10416. In 2013, Geffen Records re-released the soundtrack for digital streaming services. On October 20, 2026, Intrada Records remastered and expanded the album with previously unreleased cues and a remastered original soundtrack album.

== Reception ==
Professional ratings
Review scores
Source	Rating
AllMusic	3/5 stars
Entertainment Weekly	A−
Film Tracks	4/5 stars

An Entertainment Weekly review compared the score to the soundtracks of Gunsmoke and Oklahoma! (1955) as well as the works of Aaron Copland. Filmtracks said that the songs "play a lesser role in the success of this overall package than in the first one", but called Horner's score as "no less than fantastic". It further added that "the highlights of the full ensemble performances are the several cues in which Horner blatantly pulls Copland's rodeo music, ambitious string and light percussion rhythms with brass motifs that frankly could have resulted in a lawsuit". AllMusic called the soundtrack as "surely be a favorite among young audiences". RogerEbert.com called the score as "one of the underrated works of James Horner".

== Commercial performance ==
In the United States, Ronstadt's version of "Dreams to Dream" reached number 13 on Billboard's Adult Contemporary chart and number eight on Cashbox's Looking Ahead chart. It also reached 69 on RPM's Canadian singles chart and 18 on the magazine's Adult Contemporary chart.

== Track listing ==
All lyrics are written by Will Jennings; all music is composed by James Horner.

No.	Title	Performer(s)	Length
1.	"Dreams to Dream" (Finale Version)	Linda Ronstadt	4:42
2.	"American Tail Overture" (Main Title)	James Horner	7:09
3.	"Cat Rumble"	James Horner	7:28
4.	"Headin' Out West"	James Horner	2:35
5.	"Way Out West"	Chorus	1:47
6.	"Green River / Trek Through The Desert"	James Horner	5:43
7.	"Dreams to Dream" (Tanya's Version)	Cathy Cavadini	2:34
8.	"Building A New Town"	James Horner	2:43
9.	"Sacred Mountain"	James Horner	2:22
10.	"Reminiscing"	James Horner	2:12
11.	"The Girl You Left Behind"	Cathy Cavadini & Chorus	1:42
12.	"In Training"	James Horner	1:49
13.	"The Shoot-Out"	James Horner	5:29
14.	"A New Land – The Future"	James Horner	8:16
Total length:			56:38
