= An American Tail: The Mystery of the Night Monster =

- DVD cover
- Directed by: Larry Latham
- Screenplay by: Len Uhley
- Based on: Characters by David Kirschner
- Produced by: Larry Latham
- Starring: Thomas Dekker; Robert Hays; Susan Boyd; Candi Milo; Lacey Chabert; John Mariano; Dom DeLuise; Pat Musick; Nehemiah Persoff; Jane Singer
- Edited by: Jay Bixson
- Music by: Michael Tavera; James Horner (archive music); Amanda McBroom; Michele Brourman; Stephan Oberhoff
- Production companies: Universal Family and Home Entertainment Production; Universal Cartoon Studios; Tama Production (overseas animation studio)
- Distributed by: Universal Studios Home Video
- Release dates: December 9, 1999 (Germany); July 25, 2000 (US)
- Running time: 78 minutes
- Country: United States
- Language: English

An American Tail: The Mystery of the Night Monster (also known as An American Tail IV: The Mystery of the Night Monster) is a 1999 American animated film directed and produced by Larry Latham. It is the second direct-to-video follow-up to An American Tail, as well as the fourth and most recently released film of the series. The film premiered on December 9, 1999, in Germany, and was released on July 25, 2000, in the United States and Canada. Similar to the previous film, it features Thomas Dekker and Lacey Chabert as voicing Fievel and Tanya respectively, alongside most of the voice actors from the previous film (with the exception of Erica Yohn as Jane Singer took over her role for Mama Mousekewitz), this film introduces new characters and voices of Susan Boyd, Robert Hays, John Garry, Candi Milo, John Mariano, Jeff Bennett, and Joe Lala. Thomas Dekker received a Young Artist Award for Best Performance in a Voice-Over for Fievel.

== Plot ==
After the events of the third film, Fievel has nightmares because of rumors and stories about a mysterious monster attacking mice all over New York City. The film opens with Fievel dreaming that he is being chased by what he thinks the monster looks like (a fiery demonic cat with a mousetrap on its tongue). Tanya and Tony work at the local newspaper, the Daily Nibbler. Mama and Papa ask Tanya to take Fievel along to work, hoping it will help him with his nightmares. Tanya works as the assistant to the paper's editor, Reed Daley, whom she has a crush on. Tony works as a paperboy, using Tiger (the gang's cat friend) for transport. The kids meet up with Nellie Brie, an ace investigative reporter who specializes in uncovering corruption.

Reed makes up a, as Nellie calls it, "so-called monster" that lives under Manhattan and takes mice away during the night to add more excitement to the otherwise unimportant story, intending to sell more papers. The night monster creates fear among readers, as expected. Reed forces Nellie to report on the monster, much to her dislike. She agrees to take Fievel with her. Nellie tries to help Fievel by telling him that fear is natural and that he can face it. The two go to Chinatown to look into the latest disappearance. Fievel is tasked with drawing the monster based on witness testimony. A particularly suspicious miniature French poodle named Madame Mousey, who has started living among the mice about this time, appears claiming to be a fortune teller. She sells the mice trinkets meant to protect them from the night monster.

As Fievel continues to follow Nellie around, listening to witnesses describe the monster. His nightmares and insomnia get worse. One day, the Scottish owner of a bakery escapes the monster by pouring a tub of butter on it. Nellie and Fievel talk with him and find a cat's hairball at the scene. It is later revealed that Mousey is behind the monster attacks. She uses a secret entrance into the sewers to meet up with her gang of outlaw cats. They use the sewers to sneak under the mice's fortress wall, taking mice with the monster that Mousey provided. All the mice that had disappeared are being held in wooden cages there, to be sold off to other cats and eaten. Mousey decides she needs to capture Nellie before she can uncover Mousey's plot. She gives Tony a tip regarding the monster's lair. Reed sends Fievel and Nellie there. They come to an old, empty house. While there, they are attacked and chased by the monster after it breaks through the floorboards. Tony, having decided to come along anyway, drops a chandelier on the monster, causing it to retreat. The three of them investigate the hole and find it leads to the sewer line. They also find a rhine stone that dropped from Mousey's collar. The heroes finally decide to investigate her through the "dog council" that meets at Central Park. A dog named Lone Wolf, a member of the council and a friend of Nellie's, points them to a lost dog poster. Some research at the newspaper revealed that the old house belonged to the public works chief and his wife before they moved six months prior. The wife owns the lost dog, who turns out to be Mousey. Tony admits she gave him the tip. The paper starts printing the story that Mousey is responsible for the monster attacks.

The night monster itself is revealed to be a machine with ghastly lights and a circular saw. It was damaged during the incident at the house. Mousey convinces the Outlaw Cats to help her fix it, since she knows their plans will fall apart once Nellie publishes the story that the monster is a fake. Then the mice will know the truth and fight back. Fievel travels home to find his house is destroyed, and his parents and baby sister Yasha are gone. Tony and Tiger find Fievel and tell him that Mousey is on a rampage with her monster, taking mice all over town like crazy. Tony and Fievel send Tiger to the park to get the dogs. Meanwhile, they search Mousey's cart to find her entrances to the sewers. They follow it to the Outlaw Cats' hideout, where all the mice, including Fievel's family, are being held captive. Knowing they need help, Fievel rushes towards the newspaper office to get Nellie while Tony stays behind. Fievel finds the office destroyed, and Mousey has Reed, Nellie, and Tanya cornered by the monster and her cat henchmen. Fievel, taking Nellie's earlier advice, faces his fear and sees the monster for what it is. He uses exposed wires to zap Mousey, causing a diversion. The cats activate the machine. They destroy the presses and try to kill the mice. The mice lead the cats to the human newspaper office above. There, they manage to destroy the monster. One cat tries to attack the mice personally. Reed saves Nellie's life at the risk of his own and wins her affection. Nellie and Reed end up in a relationship, much to Tanya's despair. Meanwhile, Tony decides not to wait any longer. He turns on the water pipes, flooding the sewer. This allows the mice a chance to escape while the cats struggle to swim. Tiger arrives with the dog council, who chases away the cats and takes Mousey into custody. The film ends with the last scene at the beach at Coney Island. Tanya is still heartbroken, but Mama makes her eat anyway. Papa reads in the paper about the Outlaw Cats' last sightings. He tells Fievel that he helped Nellie find the monster under their noses, and she, in return, helped him find the courage under his nose. Tony informs the Mousekewitz family and Tiger that the "dog council" has chosen a punishment worse than prison for Mousey, returning her to her owner, Mrs. Abernathy. Mama surmises that now that the mystery has been cleared up, Fievel finally goes to sleep, only to turn around and find him with Yasha already asleep on the beach towel; Papa smiles and says, "You were saying?" The Mousekewitz family, including Tony and Tiger, share a group hug as Mama says, "Sweet dreams, my little Fievel. Sweet dreams."

== Voice cast ==
- Thomas Dekker as Fievel Mousekewitz
- Lacey Chabert as Tanya Mousekewitz
- Nehemiah Persoff as Papa Mousekewitz
- Jane Singer as Mama Mousekewitz
- Dom DeLuise as Tiger
- Keith David as Monster of Manhattan (uncredited)
- Pat Musick as Tony Toponi and Mrs. Abernathy
- Susan Boyd as Nellie Brie
- Robert Hays as Reed Daley
- John Garry as Lone Woof
- Candi Milo as Madame Mousey
- John Mariano as Twitch
- Jeff Bennett as Slug and The Great Dane
- Joe Lala as Bootlick
- Sherman Howard as Haggis

== Production ==
Like the previous direct-to-video sequel, this film was directed by Larry Latham, except it was animated by another overseas company Tama Productions along with other production companies, Complete Post and Larson Sound Center, involved in the project as Universal would end production of An American Tail film series after completing this film as they would then work on direct-to-video sequels based on Balto while continuously working on The Land Before Time sequels. Most of the previous actors reprise their roles for the franchise's original characters, except Erica Yohn as she retired from acting after casting for Mama Mousekewitz in The Treasure of Manhattan Island, which was her last film role. Jane Singer was chosen to take over Yohn's role for the character in this film. Following the changes on basic storyline focuses for this film, new characters and voices are introduced. Susan Boyd was chosen to voice for Nellie Brie, as Boyd had previously been cast as Daisy in Rover Dangerfield and lip-synced for Cameron Diaz as Tina Carlyle's singing voice in The Mask. Robert Hays, the actor known for playing Ted Striker in Airplane! and for voicing Tony Stark in the 1990's Iron Man animated series, was chosen to voice for Reed Daley. The villains are voiced by Candi Milo (Madame Mousey), Jeff Bennett (Slug), and John Mariano (Twitch), who are all well known voice actors in the animation industry. Sherman Howard was the only returning actor who voiced one of the additional characters in the previous sequel (McBrusque), but instead he voiced a minor character (Haggis).

This film was originally scheduled to be released in June 1999, but was put on hold for over a year as it would not reach the markets until after The Treasure of Manhattan Island was released first, which was delayed until the beginning of the 21st century.

== Soundtrack ==
- "Get the Facts", performed by Susan Boyd and Thomas Dekker
- "Creature de la Nuit", performed by Candi Milo, Joe Lala and Jeff Bennett
- "Who Will", performed by Susan Boyd, Thomas Dekker, Pat Musick and Dom DeLuise

== Release ==
Universal Studios Home Video released this fourth installment on VHS in North America on July 25, 2000. The film was later released on DVD in 2004, with a sing-along version of "Creature de la Nuit" as a bonus feature. It was combined with three other films on June 13, 2017.

=== Overseas ===
Before the North American release, it first premiered in Germany in December 1999. Then it was released in the United Kingdom on March 6, 2000. It was also released on November 2, 2004 in Australia, January 5, 2005 in Spain, June 23, 2005 in Japan, October 5, 2005 in Italy, October 31, 2005 in Russia and February 3, 2006 in France.

== Reception ==
David Parkinson of Radio Times rated it 2/5 stars and criticized the film's ethnic stereotyping. Parkinson concluded: "But, apart from a couple of imaginatively eerie dream sequences, there's little here to hold the attention of even the least discriminating youngster". Michael Scheinfeld of Common Sense Media, gave it positive reviews compared to the previous installment, describing it as "a mystery with spunk, courage, and heart", since this film encourages the children how to overcome their fears. Felix Vasquez Jr. called it "a nice diversion and mediocre finale to the animated series".

=== Accolades ===
Young Artist Award

- Best Voiceover Performance - Thomas Dekker (Fievel Mousekewitz)
