= An American Tail: The Computer Adventures of Fievel and His Friends =

1992 video game

- Developer(s): Manley & Associates
- Publisher(s): Capstone Software
- Producer(s): David Turner
- Designer(s): Jonathan Sposato
- Programmer(s): Robert Ridihalgh
- Artist(s): Miik Nichols; Jonathan Sposato
- Composer(s): Tom McMail
- Platform(s): MS-DOS
- Release: August 1992
- Genre(s): Adventure
- Mode(s): Single-player

An American Tail: The Computer Adventures of Fievel and His Friends is point-and-click adventure game published by Capstone Software in 1992 for MS-DOS and developed by Manley & Associates. It is based on the films An American Tail and An American Tail: Fievel Goes West. The manual includes a glossary to define difficult words for younger players. In 1994 the game was released with Trolls and Rock-A-Doodle Computerized Coloring Book on the Capstone CD Game Kids Collection.

== Gameplay ==
The player guides Fievel Mousekewitz to find and protect his family. The gameplay is a simplified click and point set of options without any deaths or dead ends. Whenever the mouse pointer is placed over a particular something, the icon changes to indicate that an appropriate action will take place to correspond with that icon, such as talking to characters, picking up items, looking at objects and going to another location. When talking to a character, the player will have multiple dialogue responses to choose from. Clicking on Fievel himself allows the player to give one or more items from his inventory to a character on screen. Throughout the game, the player must solve some mini-games to gain required items. Losing a mini-game has no consequence but requires the player to try again until the game is won by Fievel.

== Development ==
The game uses digitized scenes from the first two films and was presented to the Chicago 1992 Summer Electronics Show.

== Reception ==
Judy Muldawer reviewed the game for Computer Gaming World:

Solving these adventures promotes a feeling of accomplishment. However, because it is so difficult to assess any one age group as a target for An American Tail, the best use of this adventure game for children might be to share it as a group experience. In this way, children and adults can assist one another and, together, share the joy of accomplishment when the adventure is completed. I recommend this game as a family project for parents and children of elementary school age.
