= An American Tail: Fievel's Gold Rush =

2003 video game

- PAL cover art
- Developer(s): Hokus-Pokus
- Publisher(s): EU: Swing! Entertainment; NA: Conspiracy Entertainment
- Composer(s): Frederic Motte
- Series: An American Tail
- Platform(s): Game Boy Advance
- Release: EU: March 1, 2002; NA: May 2, 2003
- Genre(s): Platform
- Mode(s): Single player

An American Tail: Fievel's Gold Rush is a platform game that was first released in Europe on March 1, 2002, for the Game Boy Advance, then in North America on May 2, 2003. Based on Universal Studios' An American Tail animated feature film franchise, the game was developed by Hokus-Pokus and published by Swing! Entertainment in Europe and Conspiracy Entertainment in North America.

== Gameplay ==
Players control series protagonist Fievel Mousekewitz in a traditional side-scrolling platformer as he travels West through 18 levels and six worlds, including "New York City" and "Gold Dust Gulch", to piece together Cat Malone's treasure map. Fievel will swing on rope, attack with his ten-gallon hat, ride riverboats, and jump the train to find Wylie Burp's gold. Fievel's goal is to rescue his kidnapped family members and friends as well as to find the gold.

Conspiracy Entertainment published the game for a "young audience who loved the films and direct-to-video sequels".

== Reception ==
Reception

Aggregate score
Aggregator	Score
GameRankings	56%

Review score
Publication	Score
Nintendo Power	2.8/5

The game received mediocre reviews from critics. French website Jeuxvideo.com wrote that "it takes a real pleasure to play in an environment so worked. The levels are quite varied and different to want to continue. The characters are very fine and loyal to the cartoon. The animation is very fluid. You will never be hampered by a slowdown and this regardless of the number of enemies displayed[...] particular attention was brought to the soundtrack. It is really very good quality and quite adapted to crossed levels. But there also are somewhat regretted the lack of diversity in the music". The publication pointed out that the title appeals to younger players due in part to the game's short length.
