= An American Tail: Fievel Goes West =

1991 animated film directed by Phil Nibbelink and Simon Wells

- Theatrical release poster
- Directed by: Phil Nibbelink; Simon Wells
- Screenplay by: Flint Dille
- Story by: Charles Swenson
- Based on: Characters by: David Kirschner; Judy Freudberg; Tony Geiss
- Produced by: Steven Spielberg; Robert Watts
- Starring: Phillip Glasser; James Stewart; Erica Yohn; Cathy Cavadini; Nehemiah Persoff; Dom DeLuise; Amy Irving; John Cleese; Jon Lovitz
- Edited by: Nick Fletcher
- Music by: James Horner
- Production companies: Universal Cartoon Studios; Amblin Entertainment; Amblimation
- Distributed by: Universal Pictures
- Release dates: November 17, 1991 (Kennedy Center); November 22, 1991 (United States)
- Running time: 75 minutes
- Country: United States
- Language: English
- Budget: $16.5 million
- Box office: $40.8 million

An American Tail: Fievel Goes West (also known as An American Tail II: Fievel Goes West) is a 1991 American animated Western musical comedy film directed by Phil Nibbelink and Simon Wells (in their feature directorial debuts), with producer Steven Spielberg for Amblin Entertainment and animated by his Amblimation animation studio and released by Universal Pictures. A sequel to 1986's An American Tail, the film follows the story of the Mousekewitzes, a family of Russian-Jewish mice who emigrate to the Wild West. In it, Fievel is separated from his family as the train approaches the American Old West; the film chronicles him and Sheriff Wylie Burp teaching Tiger how to act like a dog.

Fievel Goes West was the first production for the short-lived Amblimation, a studio Spielberg set up to keep the animators of Who Framed Roger Rabbit (1988) working. It is also the only Amblimation film to use cel animation, the last in the series to do so, and the last to be released in theaters. While the animation medium was transitioning to computers in the late 1980s and early 1990s, Spielberg wanted almost all of the animation of Fievel Goes West to be hand-drawn, describing animation as "an arts-and-crafts business". He also wanted the animation to have a "live-action" feel. Phillip Glasser, Dom DeLuise, Nehemiah Persoff, and Erica Yohn reprise their roles from the first film for Fievel Goes West. Tanya's original voice actor, Amy Green, was replaced by Cathy Cavadini, and new characters were voiced by John Cleese, Amy Irving, Jon Lovitz, and James Stewart in his final film role. James Horner returned as a composer and wrote the film's song "Dreams to Dream", which garnered a Golden Globe nomination.

Premiering at the Kennedy Center on November 17, 1991, An American Tail: Fievel Goes West began its American theatrical run on November 22. This was the same day Walt Disney Pictures' Beauty and the Beast (1991) was distributed, making it the third instance of two animated films being released on the same date. Fievel Goes West was promoted with a wide array of tie-ins and started in the top ten at the box office. The film grossed $22 million in the United States against a budget of $16 million. Some film journalists and executives attributed this to having to compete with the Disney film.

Upon its release, Fievel Goes West received mixed reviews from critics: while its animation, score, and voice performances were praised, most criticisms targeted its story, pacing, and lack of character development. However, it found success when it came to home video sales, quickly reaching the top of the video charts when released on tape in March 1992; at the time, the film held the record for shortest theater-to-home-video transfer, and it has since gained a large cult following. In addition to garnering more home media releases, television airings, and video game adaptations later on, the film has made numerous 2010s retrospective best-of lists from online publications, especially best Netflix-available Western films. Fievel Goes West was followed by a short-lived CBS series named Fievel's American Tails and two direct-to-video films: An American Tail: The Treasure of Manhattan Island (1998) and An American Tail: The Mystery of the Night Monster (1999).

== Plot ==
In 1890, five years after emigrating to the United States, the impoverished Mousekewitz family are still struggling against the attacks of mouse-hungry cats. Fievel spends his days thinking about a bloodhound-sheriff called Wylie Burp, while Tanya dreams of becoming a singer. Meanwhile, Tiger's girlfriend, Miss Kitty, leaves him to find a new life out west, remarking that perhaps she is looking for "a cat that's more like a dog".

A British aristocratic cat named Cat R. Waul launches an attack on the mice, forcing them to flee into the sewers. There, they come across a cowboy mouse, who is in fact a marionette controlled by Cat R. Waul, who tricks the mice into moving out west. Tiger tries catching up with his friends, but is thrown off course by a group of dogs. While on the train, Fievel wanders into the livestock car and overhears the cats' intentions to eat the mice. After being discovered, Fievel tries to flee but Cat R. Waul has his hench-spider, T.R. Chula, strand Fievel in the middle of the desert. Devastated over his loss, his family arrives in Green River, Utah.

Upon arrival in Green River, T.R. Chula blocks up the water tower, drying up the river. Cat R. Waul approaches the mice and proposes to build a new saloon together, although intending to trick the mice into doing the bulk of the work and eat them afterwards. Meanwhile, Fievel wanders aimlessly through the desert, as does Tiger, who has found his way out west as well, and they pass each other. However, they each figure that the other is a mirage and continue on their separate ways. Tiger is captured by a local mouse native tribe and hailed as a god. Fievel is picked up by a hawk, dropped over the native village and reunites with Tiger, who chooses to stay while Fievel catches a passing tumbleweed, which takes him to Green River. He reunites with his family, but they are oblivious to Cat R. Waul's plans. At the saloon, Fievel overhears the cats' plan yet again and is discovered once more by Cat R. Waul, who tries eating Fievel, but is thwarted when he hears Tanya singing. He sends Tanya to Miss Kitty, who is now a saloon-girl cat and she reveals that she came at Cat R. Waul's request. He tells Miss Kitty to put her on stage and Tanya performs for the cats. Meanwhile, Fievel is chased by T.R. Chula and taken prisoner, but flees.

Despondent, Fievel speaks with an elderly bloodhound sleeping outside the jail, discovering he is actually Wylie Burp. Fievel convinces him to help and train Tiger as a lawman and as a dog. Though initially reluctant, Tiger relents at the suggestion that a new persona might win back Miss Kitty. They return to Green River to fight the cats, who attempt to use a concealed giant mouse trap on the mice at sunset during the opening of Cat R. Waul's saloon. Tiger, Wylie Burp and Fievel fight the cats, during which Miss Kitty and Tanya discover the trap. Tanya rushes to the mice and, using her singing abilities, helps them escape. Seeing this, Waul uses a giant revolver as a makeshift cannon on the fleeing mice, but Fievel intercepts him. As T.R. Chula takes Miss Kitty hostage, an incensed Tiger rescues her, and the heroes use the mouse trap as a catapult to send Waul and his henchmen out of Green River. The cats fly into a mailbag, which a passing train picks up and leaves. Enamored by his new personality, Miss Kitty reunites with Tiger. Tanya becomes a famous singer and the water tower flows with 1,000 gallons again, making Green River bloom with thousands of flowers. Fievel finds Wylie Burp away from the party, who hands him his sheriff badge. Fievel is Wylie Burp unsure about taking it but realizes that his journey is not over.

== Voice cast ==
- Phillip Glasser as Fievel Mousekewitz
- Cathy Cavadini as Tanya Mousekewitz
- Dom DeLuise as Tiger
- Amy Irving as Miss Kitty
- James Stewart as Wylie Burp
- John Cleese as Cat R. Waul
- Jon Lovitz as T.R. Chula
- Nehemiah Persoff as Papa Mousekewitz
- Erica Yohn as Mama Mousekewitz
- Patrick Pinney as One Eye
- Jack Angel as Frenchy
- Mickie McGowan as Saloon Lady
- David Tate as additional voices

== Production ==
=== Development ===
A sequel to Steven Spielberg's An American Tail (1986) under the working title An American Tail II was put into pre-production by David Kirschner in April 1988 after he finished producing Child's Play (1988); when announcing the project that same month, he summarized that Fievel will "fight the cat-tle barons. It's like a John Ford western with Jewish mice". Kirschner started pre-production as Spielberg was setting up filming for Indiana Jones and the Last Crusade (1989) in Europe. He was not involved in the production and post-production, and admitted in 1993 that he disliked Fievel Goes West as "entertainment without character". The screenplay was written by Flint Dille, who was led to the position by writing for Spielberg's Tiny Toon Adventures (1990–92).

Spielberg produced the live-action animated film Who Framed Roger Rabbit (1988), which was the top grossing motion picture of 1988. As a way to keep the movie's animators working, due to the closure of Richard Williams Animation, Spielberg formed Amblimation, a collaboration of Universal City Studios and Amblin Entertainment, whose offices were located in London. Fievel Goes West was its first production and over 250 crew members from 15 different nations worked on the project starting May 1989. At the time, Amblimation was also developing We're Back! A Dinosaur's Story (1993), Balto (1995), and a screen adaptation of Andrew Lloyd Webber's Cats which never saw completion. In December 1988, Universal announced that they would release an animated film every eighteen months and begin production on An American Tail II in early 1989.

Don Bluth, who had partnered with Spielberg on both the original film and The Land Before Time (1988), was set to direct and have Sullivan Bluth Studios provide the animation; owing to creative differences, however, they parted ways. As Bluth explained, "the business deal wasn't such that it helped our company". With no Bluth in sight for the sequel, Spielberg instead relied on ex-Disney animator Phil Nibbelink and ex-Richard Williams storyboard artist Simon Wells, the great-grandson of science-fiction author H. G. Wells, to direct the project. Nibbelink and Wells had both previously worked with Spielberg as supervising animators on Who Framed Roger Rabbit. Bluth said in April 1992 that he regretted his decision, admitting that he disliked the final product of Fievel Goes West and "maybe we could've helped that film a little more".

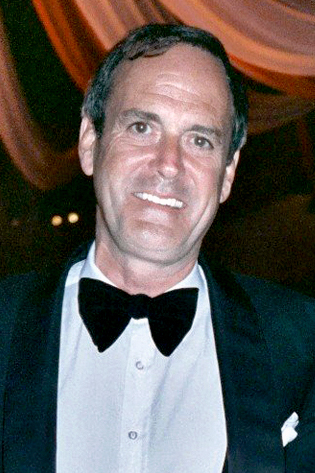
Cleese was paid his lowest fee in ten years for Fievel Goes West.

With John Cleese as the first choice for Cat R. Waul, he was approached in 1989 by one of the film's producers at what Cleese vaguely called "the Italian Oscars". He accepted the offer based on his enjoyment of the first American Tail and "I love sound studios anyway – there's none of the hassle and boredom and time wasting you get in television". Cleese was paid his lowest fee in ten years for the role, however, which made him very unwilling to publicize his involvement with Fievel Goes West. According to Cathy Cavadini, there was another woman initially planned to voice Tanya but left the project, so Cavadini replaced her. Spielberg met James Stewart at a party asking him to voice Wylie Burp, and all of Stewart's lines were recorded in ten days; his last involvement in a Western was in The Shootist (1976).

=== Animation ===
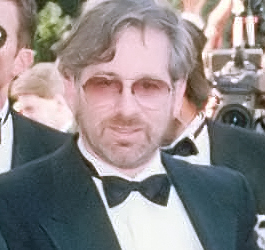
"Computers are on their way, but so far, we have religiously stayed away from them. This is still an arts-and-crafts business, and we have taken the old approach – the personal rapport that happens between an artist and a piece of paper". —Spielberg in a 1991 Los Angeles presentation of Fievel Goes West's production process.

Don Bluth's departure from the project resulted in the animation of Fievel Goes West lacking the Disney-isms of the first film's animation. Instead, its animation is faster-paced and contains more elements of Warner Bros. cartoons. Spielberg instructed his animators to take on a "live-action" method to animating the film, where the characters are affected by parts of the environment such as lighting. Spielberg also directed for the camera to constantly move in sequences such as the sewer ride sequence and a 360-degree pan shot of the film's desert vista. These types of crane and dolly shots replicated certain shots in Spielberg's Jaws (1975) and Raiders of the Lost Ark (1981) and were considered groundbreaking for the time.

Apart from one computer-generated shot of the valley's ground, all of the film was hand-drawn animated; the process was so intensive that it took at least one week to complete a minute of animation, around sixty artists to paint approximately 230,000 cels, and a week for a single animator to finish three seconds of animation. As Fievel Goes West was a parody of Western films, the animators heavily studied the works of John Ford and Sergio Leone.

=== Sound design ===
The voices were recorded over a 10-day period at Interlock Studios (now Larson Studios) at Crossroads of the World in Los Angeles in 1989; ten takes were tracked for each actor at varying speeds and phrasing. The voice actors were videotaped during their recording sessions, and the animators used the footage as reference for moving the characters. The biggest focus was on keeping Cat R. Waul's movement similar to his voice actor's while recording in the studio, as the directors wanted him to feel like Cleese instead of just a cat voiced by him. Nancy Beiman originally worked as a regular animator on Fievel Goes West, but became a supervisor on the project six months after she entered Amblimation. While not assigned to supervise Miss Kitty's animation, she asked for the position and got it. She enjoying working on Kitty for Irving's Mae West-esque delivery and the "scatterbrained dialogue" giving her freedom in animating the character.

=== Music ===
The score was composed by James Horner, who previously scored for the last film (1986) also produced by Spielberg. The album was released by MCA Records and featured 14 tracks, including four original songs written by Horner and Will Jennings, and performed by Linda Ronstadt and Cathy Cavadini. The song "Dreams to Dream", was nominated for a Golden Globe award and a contender by the Academy Award voters for a Best Original Song nomination, although it did not receive one.

== Marketing and release ==
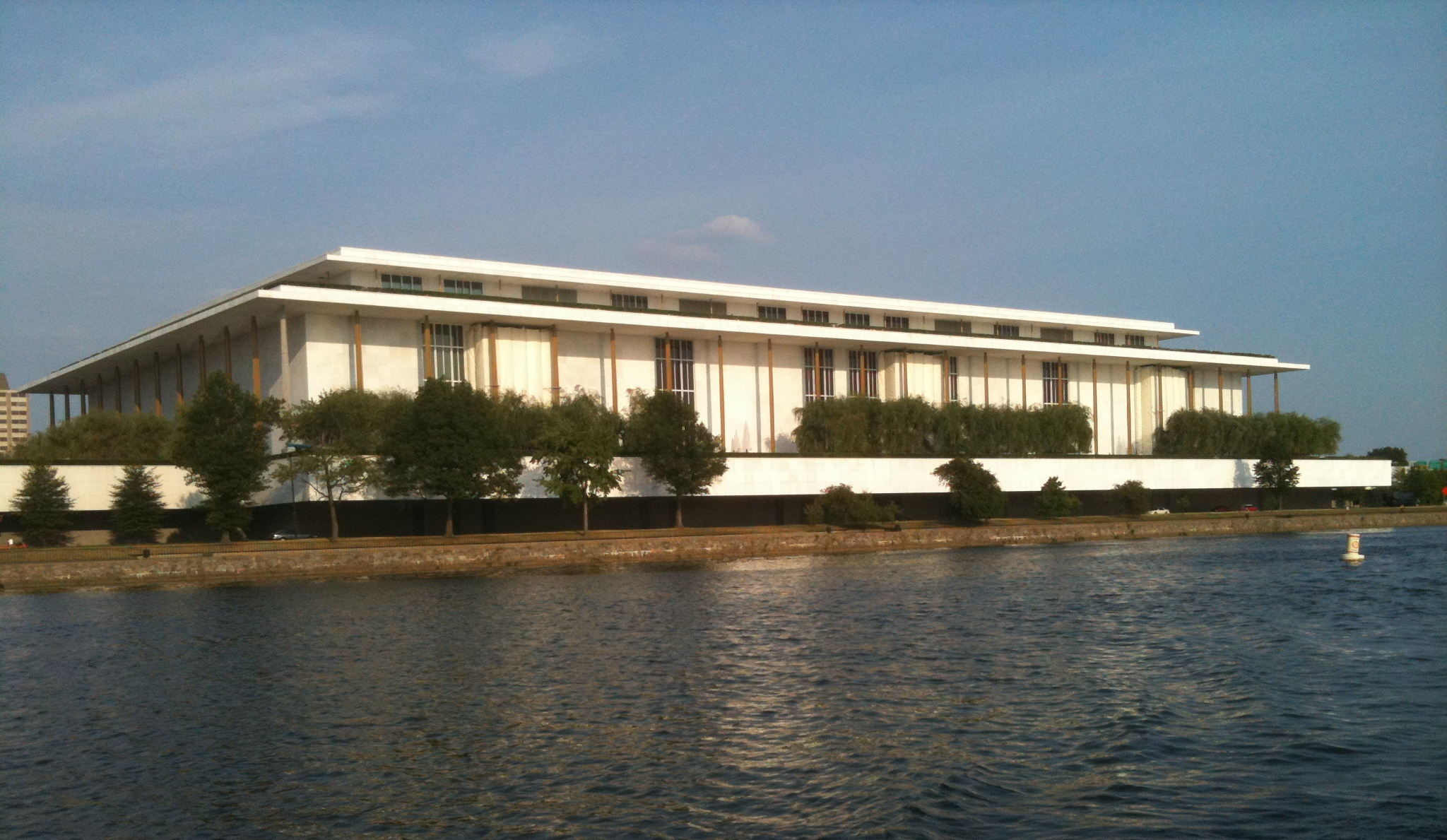
An American Tail: Fievel Goes West made its debut as the big children's theatre act of the John F. Kennedy recital before its nationwide theatrical release.

Fievel Goes West was initially planned for a fall 1990 release, but was delayed to a late 1991 date. In 1989, the date was moved again to Christmas 1992 before reverting to Christmas 1991 in May 1990, when the subtitle Fievel Goes West and a follow-up television series was also first announced. It was moved to the fall of 1991 in November 1990. It made its worldwide premiere at the John F. Kennedy Center for the Performing Arts as their big children's theatre recital performance, on November 17, 1991, where 275 inner-city kids that were guests of Fannie Mae's company attended the event; the children also made their own American Tail storybook and posed with a costume version of Fievel for pictures. Notable adult attendees includes Chuck Robb, Lynda Bird Johnson Robb, Al Gore, Marvin Bush, Margaret Bush, Fred Grandy, Elliot Richardson, and Robert Haft.

Both Fievel Goes West and Disney's Beauty and the Beast (1991) began their United States theater runs on November 22, 1991; this was the third instance of two animated films being released on the same day, after The Land Before Time and Oliver & Company in 1988, and The Little Mermaid and All Dogs Go to Heaven in 1989. Boston Herald noted the clash as "a testimony to the revival of interest in feature-length animation". Along with competing with an unusual number of family films with middling budgets such as The Addams Family, Curly Sue, My Girl, and Spielberg's Hook, both Beauty and the Beast and Fievel Goes West were promoted with, as of the films' release date, the most expensive set of film tie-ins ever.

40 brands licensed with Universal to promote the film, including the non-profit Reading Is Fundamental, which used the character of Fievel as a mascot for Reading Buddies kits; and Pizza Hut, which used characters from the film on designs their Pizza Packs and soft-drink cups, a decision influenced by their previous tie-in success with the Disney summer film The Rocketeer (1991). Upon the film's release, Universal Studios Tour opened the attraction Mouse Trap, a 2,500-seat interactive version of Fievel Goes West. In the summer of 1992, Universal Studios Florida opened American Tail: Fievel's Playland, a playground featuring set recreations of An American Tail and Fievel Goes West. Boxtress also released an illustrated book version of the film written by Cathy East Dubowski and Beverly Lazor-Bahr.

== Home media ==
An American Tail: Fievel Goes West received its first VHS and cassette release on March 19, 1992. Nichols and Tower Video's John Thrasher predicted it would do well in sales due to a lack of competition. According to Nichols, three million copies were rumored to be circulated, although MCA/Universal was willing to reveal the real number. Upon its 1992 VHS release, Fievel Goes West held the record for shortest theater-to-home-video transfer, previously held in a tie by Batman (1989) and Robin Hood: Prince of Thieves (1991). The video for Fievel Goes West topped the video charts the week it was issued, and even when it was dethroned by a reissue of One Hundred and One Dalmatians (1961), it remained at the number-two spot of the Top Kid Video chart for several weeks. On April 10, 1992, the U.S. Postal Service began selling envelopes with 29-cent Western-Americana-themed stamps designed by Harry Zelenko to promote the home video of Fievel Goes West; 19 of them were reissued on May 1 using recycled paper. The release was pulled from the shelves in January 1993.

Beginning on November 18, 1994, McDonald's, in a deal with MCA/Universal, offered customers a $2.50 rebate on a video purchase of Jurassic Park (1993) if they purchased from McDonald's one of the following tapes for six dollars: Fievel Goes West, The Land Before Time (1988), Back to the Future (1985), and Field of Dreams (1989). Fievel Goes West garnered its first American television airing on April 13, 1997, via a Disney Channel "Tune In to Kids and Family Week" promotion of another TV debut, Pocahontas (1995). On August 11, 1998, as part of Universal Family Features's highly-family-demanded $15-million campaign to relaunch the American Tail franchise after a six-year moratorium; digitally-restored versions of An American Tail and Fievel Goes West were released on VHS on a 2-tape release. On the issue of October 3, 1998, the set debuted at number 19 on Billboard's Top Kid Video chart.

An American Tail: Fievel Goes West was released on Video CD in Hong Kong on July 20, 2001, on DVD in the United States on September 25, 2003, Spain on September 29, 2005, and Denmark on November 15, 2011. In the United Kingdom, it first appeared on December 6, 2006, on DVD as part of a Slim 2 box set that featured the first two American Tail films. Similar two-film DVD collections were released in Spain on June 22, 2009, and the United States on August 22, 2010. The film was part of a DVD collection that included all four movies in the franchise on June 13, 2017. Fievel Goes West was issued to Blu-ray on April 4, 2017, in the United States, July 4 in Canada, and September 25 in the United Kingdom. Unlike the previous home media releases, the film has a sequence edited, like the infamous hidden penis doodle that was briefly seen during Tanya's version of "Dreams to Dream" was removed, thanks to the controversy. On online platforms, the film was released to Amazon Prime on November 11, 2013, Netflix on April 1, 2017, and Movies Anywhere on October 12, 2017.

== Reception ==
=== Box office ===
Maybe we put too much faith in a sequel ... when our audience had grown out of [An American Tail] six years later.

— A Universal executive when interviewed by The New York Times, 1991

Amblin Entertainment previously competed with Disney twice: in 1986 when the first American Tail competed with a re-issue of Lady and the Tramp (1955) and in 1988 when it released The Land Before Time around the same time as Oliver & Company. Amblin won both races; Fred Mound, Universal distribution president, said: "We've proven in the past that there's room for two animated features". Tom Pollock, a Universal chairman, also had faith that Fievel Goes West would perform well. Spielberg and Disney's Dick Cook suggested both films would be hits, although Spielberg predicted Beauty and the Beast to make more profits due to having more of an adult appeal than Fievel Goes West. Disney chairman Jeffrey Katzenberg stated in regards to the competition: "We've competed with Amblin before and learned that there's enough room for both. These movies aren't mutually exclusive. There's a big market out there. The success of one doesn't depend on the failure of the other".

Opening to 1,400 theaters in the United States, Fievel Goes West has, as of November 2019, the 110th widest G-rated release of all time and the 96th widest G-rated film opening in the United States. It also has the 124th all-time biggest opening weekend for a G-rated film, opening in fourth place with $3,435,625; and has 60th smallest weekend drop for a film in 600-plus theaters thanks to its second week grossing $3,782,080. However, it also holds the record of the 119th post-thanksgiving weekend drops. Fievel Goes West eventually made just over $22 million domestically, and $18 million overseas, for a total of $40,766,041, making it the 60th highest-grossing film of 1991 in the United States and the 37th highest grosser of the year worldwide. As of December 2019, it is the 141st highest domestic-grossing G-rated film of all time and 123rd worldwide. By contrast, the original film made $47.4 million in the U.S. in 1986, a record at the time for a non-Disney animated one, and a further $36 million overseas, for a total of $84 million.

According to The Washington Post, Fievel Goes West tied with For the Boys (1991) for "the dubious if unofficial distinction of the fastest failure of a big-budget holiday movie". Some journalists and film executives attributed the film's weak box office to the intense competition it faced with Beauty and the Beast. However, it wasn't competing with the Disney production in Canada, and it failed there too according to a Universal executive, who also blamed Spielberg's lack of involvement in the marketing due to being too busy on Hook. Another official of the company explained that he had little faith in the project, describing it as "charmless" and its animation "pedestrian". Other writers blamed it on the content. Dennis Hunt suggested that "the complex story line and the scary villains didn't quite click with the kiddies", and Bernard Weinraub wrote that "even children were not especially interested in an old-fashioned animated movie". Steven Hulett of the union Motion Picture Screen Cartoonists opined that the low performances of both Fievel Goes West and We're Back!: A Dinosaur Story (1993) resulted from the poor quality of their stories, "and animation is a story-driven art form". He attributed this to Spielberg's busy schedule, meaning he didn't have enough time to focus on animation.

=== Critical response ===
An American Tail: Fievel Goes West holds a 59% critical percentage on Rotten Tomatoes based on 17 reviews. Peter M. Nichols wrote Fievel Goes West "was panned on the ground that it was not so innovative as other new animated films, notably Beauty and the Beast from Disney, the leader in animation". Multiple reviewers lambasted Fievel Goes West's lack of a cohesive story and extremely fast pace. As critics summarized, the film "has constant activity but minimal objectives"; "has little narrative drive or emotional resonance", its climax feeling "perfunctory and tacked on"; and has "so many subplots and digressions" that "they simply failed to develop the central narrative". Some reviewers were also uncomforted by the Indian mice tribe as being racially insensitive. Empire opined that, despite its enjoyable comedic relief characters and "fantastic chase scenes", Fievel Goes West suffered from being "fairly predictable". One reviewer in contrast appreciated the bits of "sophisticated humor" and Holocaust undertones in the script, and another highlighted its gag, such as the scene of Tiger being taken captive by the Indian mice. Some critics called the songs weaker and not as memorable as those of the first film, although the Blues Brothers' version of the song "Rawhide" was spotlighted by some writers and "The Girl You Left Behind" by a People magazine review.

Time Out London published an ecstatic review of Fievel Goes West: "Miles better than the overrated American Tail, this laugh-packed sequel boasts all the classic elements so often missing from modern cartoon features: a straightforward zip-zang-boom storyline, clearly etched characters with instantly identifiable flaws, tip-top voice-overs by well-chosen celebrities, and oodles of elasticated slapstick". The Orlando Sentinel wrote that the main plot is "left underdeveloped" amid "numerous subplots". Unlike other critics, Cortney Thekan appreciated the huge amount of subplots: "I mean, we all know the attention span of a 4-year-old. Full-length cartoons need the subplots to hold children's attention". The Washington Post praised it for being "quick, vivid and a real hoot to viewers of any age", but also noted its wonky setup, saying that "the family is tricked into a cross-country quest by a fast-talking fake mouse [...] Not only are the marionette's strings fully visible during Cat R. Waul's spiel, but the cat can be seen through a sewer grate. Stupid mice!" Halliwell's Film Guide labeled Fievel Goes West as an "enjoyable and high-spirited animated film that borrows plot and attitudes from classic Westerns". Roger Ebert gave it two-and-a-half stars out of four and wrote: "There is nothing really the matter with An American Tail: Fievel Goes West, except that it is not inspired with an extra spark of imagination in addition to its competent entertainment qualities".

Most critics found the animation high-quality in general. The Chicago Tribune's Clifford Terry applauded the "vivid and rich" animation, particularly the "colorful figures and detailed backgrounds". Solomon highlighted its "tricky point-of-view shots, such as inside a rolling tumbleweed", and the changes to most of the character designs; while Brenna Kield of the Sun-Sentinel highlighted the realism in the scenery and character movements. Roger Hurlburt called its animation "bright and sassy, "colorful backdrops" and "eye-filling uses of exciting angles". The animation wasn't completely devoid of noted perks in reviews. Solomon criticized the little amount of "nuances of thought and emotion" in the characters; The New York Times summarized the movie's take on the West as "surprisingly dull"; Kield felt that some scenes, especially those that take place in the West, could've been a bit lighter; and The Austin Chronicle opined that "the foregrounds are expressive but the backgrounds are bland and uninspired". The Radio Times enjoyed the animation the least, as "the animation could easily have been done in the 1940s, such is its flat traditionalism". While Terry found most of the characters unmemorable, he and other reviewers praised the presence of Wylie Burp. While most reviews applauded the voice cast, a Hartford Courant review was more divided towards it, appreciating Irving and Stewart's performances but finding DeLuise and his character irritating and Cleese "wasted" on the film. Empire also named Waul "one of the least dastardly animated villains ever, even with the slithering vocal talents of John Cleese".

Entertainment Weekly named it one of the best children's films of 1991 alongside Beauty and the Beast and Wild Hearts Can't Be Broken (1991); and The Seattle Times honored it as one of 1991's "Best arguments for sequels" alongside Terminator 2: Judgment Day, Bill & Ted's Bogus Journey, and The Naked Gun 2½: The Smell of Fear. In a 1993 newspaper feature about portrayals of females in animated films, journalist Ann Doss Helms disliked how most animated women had no other characters of the same gender to motivate or guide them; the writer criticized how little attention Tanya's parents gave to her aspirations, but praised the advice Miss Kitty gave to Tanya, suggesting "there's hope that things are changing".

== Later years ==
In the late 2010s, An American Tail: Fievel Goes West was recognized on publication lists of best Netflix-available westerns, ranking in the top ten of lists by Paste and The Daily Dot. It was also number 24 on GameSpot's "25 Best '90s Movies On Netflix", appeared on Wonderwall's list of best animated sequels, and landed on a Cosmopolitan list of "50 Movies You Definitely Watched in the '90s and Forgot About". Including it on a list of "19 Classic Movies That Prove 1991 Was Truly The Best Year For Film", Bustle described the film as "a fun, action-adventure comedy that gave Fievel's sister Tanya some much-needed screen time". Both Fievel Goes West and the first American Tail were tied for the number-five spot of a list of best non-Disney films from My Web Times: "Political and historical, these feature some fab songs and fun voice-over work from the likes of Jimmy Stewart (in his last role), John Cleese, Madeline Kahn and Dom DeLuise". In her book Steven Spielberg: A Life in Films (Jewish Lives), Molly Haskell wrote that both An American Tail and its sequel Fievel Goes West were oddly more "personal" for Spielberg than Schindler's List (1993), "the film that certified the director's rebirth as a Jew, and his much-vaunted evolution into a newfound 'maturity'".

In a 2017 /Film feature about Amblimation, Dalin Rowell highlighted the "cinematic" scale of its animation and opined that it "should be remembered for its creativity and willingness to be a bit more bold and daring than its predecessor". A 2016 review from Greg Jameson of Entertainment Focus opined it "has less universal appeal than the original, because the themes aren't as rooted in human experience so it packs less of an emotional punch", but he nonetheless called it a fun film and praised its animation and voice acting.

== Other media ==
=== Comics ===
Between January and February 1992, Marvel Comics ran a three-issue series based on Fievel Goes West, written by D.G. Chichester with art by George Wildman.

=== Video games ===
An LCD game based on the film was created by Tiger Electronics in 1991, and a computer game was created in 1993. A Super Nintendo Entertainment System video game of the same name was released in 1994; it was heavily praised by video game critics for its presentation, although its simple gameplay garnered divided opinions. A Game Boy Advance video game based on the film called An American Tail: Fievel's Gold Rush was released by Conspiracy Entertainment in January 2002 to mixed reviews.

== Future ==
=== Followups ===
Two direct-to-video followups were produced after the series: An American Tail: The Treasure of Manhattan Island, released in 1998, and An American Tail: The Mystery of the Night Monster, released in 1999. A piece of dialogue from Fievel in the former appears to retcon Fievel Goes West as a dream the character had. The reason for this was due to a number of inconsistencies and to hue the series closer to the first film as much as it can.

=== Spin-off television series ===
On September 12, 1992, the TV series Fievel's American Tails premiered on CBS; it is a follow-up of Fievel Goes West and features actors such as Glasser, Cavadini and DeLuise reprising their roles. In 2020, NBCUniversal regained rights to the series and it is available on Peacock, over two decades after being abandoned since the release of the DTV films in the late 1990s.

== Legacy ==
Fievel later served as the mascot for Steven Spielberg's Amblimation animation studio, appearing in its production logo. There was also a Fievel-themed playground at Universal Studios Florida, featuring a large water slide and many oversized objects such as books, glasses, cowboy boots, and more. It was the only such playground at any of NBC Universal's theme parks.

The Jimmy Stewart Museum, a museum dedicated to Stewart, has presented Fievel Goes West four times: on September 6, 2015, January 9, 2016, March 11, 2017, and July 8, 2017. On April 28, 2018, Fievel Goes West was screened at the Autry Museum of the American West, a Los Angeles museum of the history of the American West. Comedy television series such as 30 Rock, Brooklyn Nine-Nine, and Rick and Morty have referenced Fievel Goes West.

== See also ==
- List of animated feature films
- 1991 in film
