= The Thirteenth Day: The Story of Esther =

- Written by: Norman Hudis
- Directed by: Leo Penn
- Starring: Olivia Hussey; Tony Musante; Harris Yulin
- Music by: Morton Stevens
- Country of origin: United States
- Original language: English

Production
- Producer: David Victor
- Running time: 60 minutes

Original release
- Network: ABC
- Release: November 18, 1979

The Thirteenth Day: The Story of Esther is a 1979 American television film based on the Bible's Book of Esther, starring Olivia Hussey in the title role. A pilot for a biblical anthology series, it first aired on ABC on November 18, 1979.

== Cast ==
- Olivia Hussey as Esther
- Tony Musante as King Ahasuerus
- Harris Yulin as Haman
- Nehemiah Persoff as Mordecai
- Ted Wass as Simon
- Erica Yohn as Sura
- Kario Salem as Dalphon
