= An American Tail: Fievel Goes West (video game) =

1994 video game

- North American box art
- Developer: Shimada Kikaku
- Publisher: Hudson Soft
- Producer: Eiji Aoyama
- Designer: Junzo Shimada
- Programmers: Junya Shimoda; Tetsuo Oyama; Tomonari Ikeda
- Artists: Yosuke Ikeda; Yūko Chikuda
- Composers: Munetaka Sakamoto; Takashi Tsumaki; Takeshi Sato
- Series: An American Tail
- Platform: Super NES
- Release: NA: August 1994; EU: November 1994
- Genre: Platform
- Mode: Single-player

An American Tail: Fievel Goes West (Note: Japanese: アメリカ物語2/ファイベル西へ行く, Hepburn: Amerika Monogatari 2/Faiberu Nishi e Iku) is a Super NES platform game released in 1994. It is the second game released based on the film of the same name; the other is an adventure game for MS-DOS, published by Capstone Software.

== Gameplay ==
Gameplay screenshot.

The player must either fight or avoid cats and other obstacles as they stroll westward. The game is side-scrolling with a side-view of the action at nearly all times. The character is armed with a pop gun that can eliminate enemies using a non-violent approach to the Wild West genre.

== Plot ==
The storyline of the game is based on the film's plot. Set in the Wild West during 1890, the game is about a 3-inch tall cartoon mouse named Fievel who must make his way to the 1870s-1900s Wild West.

== Reception ==
Reception

Review scores
Publication	Score
AllGame	2.5/5
Computer and Video Games	81%
Electronic Gaming Monthly	7/10, 7/10, 5/10, 5/10
Game Players	55%
Official Nintendo Magazine	83/100
Total!	(UK) 72%, (DE) 5+
Entertainment Weekly	B+
Games World	79/100
Super Gamer	74/100

An American Tail: Fievel Goes West on the SNES received mixed reception from critics.
