= Nehemiah Persoff =

American actor and painter (1919–2022)

- נחמיה פרסוף
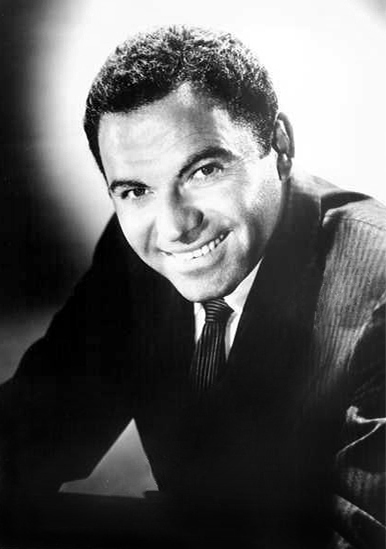
- Persoff in 1960
- Born: August 2, 1919; Jerusalem
- Died: April 5, 2022 (aged 102); San Luis Obispo, California, U.S.
- Citizenship: Israel; United States
- Education: Hebrew Technical Institute
- Occupations: Actor; painter
- Years active: 1948–2003
- Spouse: Thia Persov (m. 1951; died 2021)
- Children: 4
- Military career
- Allegiance: United States
- Branch: United States Army
- Service years: 1942–1945
- Conflicts: World War II

Signature
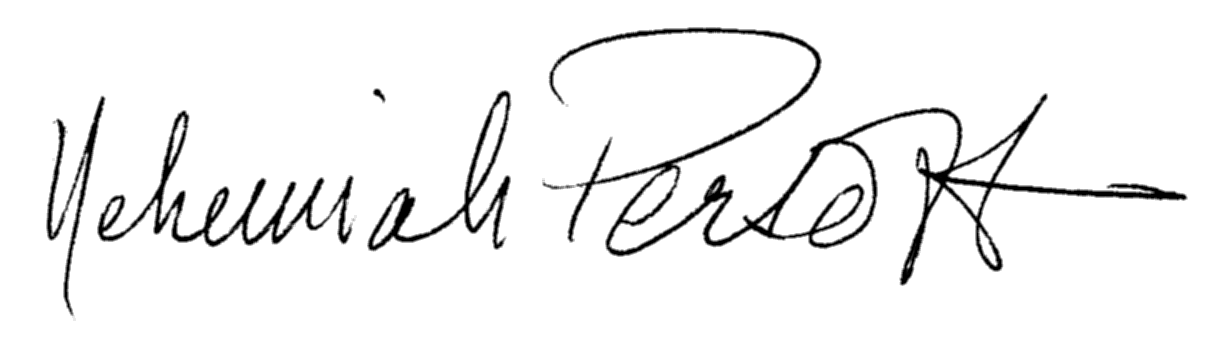

Nehemiah Persoff (Hebrew: נחמיה פרסוף; August 2, 1919 – April 5, 2022) was an American actor and painter. He appeared in more than 200 television series, films, and theatre productions, and also performed as a voice artist in a career spanning 55 years.

His first acting role was as an extra in The Naked City (1948). Persoff is best known for roles as Leo in The Harder They Fall (1956), as Little Bonaparte in Some Like It Hot (1959), as Jake "Greasy Thumb" Guzik in The Untouchables (1959–1963), as Rebbe Mendel in Yentl (1983), and as the voice of Papa Mousekewitz in the animated film An American Tail (1986) and its sequels. He also made appearances on episodes of The Twilight Zone, Gilligan's Island, Hawaii Five-O, Adam-12, and Law & Order.

== Early life and education ==
Persoff was born to Shmuel Persoff and Puah Holman in the city of Jerusalem in 1919. His father, Shmuel, was a silversmith, jeweler, and art teacher born in Chernihiv, Russian Empire (now Ukraine). His mother, Puah, was from a Jewish family that had lived in Jerusalem for many generations. His father decided that there were better prospects for him and his family in the United States and in 1923 immigrated on his own. By 1929, he had become financially secure in New York City and sponsored the immigration of his wife, three sons and two daughters. At first, the family lived in an apartment in Williamsburg, Brooklyn, before eventually moving to The Bronx. The family spoke Yiddish and Hebrew at home. Although not religious, Persoff was a devout Zionist for his entire life. As a teenager Persoff worked in odd jobs to support his family during the Great Depression. He attended the Hebrew Technical Institute in New York City, graduating as a certified electrician in 1937. He studied acting at the New Theatre acting school after obtaining a scholarship.

=== Military service ===
In 1942, he was drafted into the United States Army and served for the remainder of World War II; he was assigned to the Special Services for entertainment. He was tasked with forming an acting company that performed for soldiers. After he completed his military service, he took up an electrician's job as a subway signal maintenance worker in New York City.

== Career ==
Persoff began to pursue his acting career in New York theatre. In 1947, he was accepted into the Actors Studio and was one of the 26 members of the beginners' class taught by Elia Kazan, along with Martin Balsam, Julie Harris, Kim Hunter, Cloris Leachman, and James Whitmore. He began his acting career in 1948. His first role was an uncredited bit part in the documentary–style detective film The Naked City (1948).

To further his acting career, Persoff stayed in the United States and did not return to Israel to fight in the 1948 Arab-Israeli War, a decision he later regretted. In 1951, he visited Israel and performed at the Cameri Theatre in productions of The Glass Menagerie and Volpone.

Among his early film roles was as the taxi driver during Marlon Brando's "I coulda been a contender" scene in On the Waterfront (1954); Leo the accountant in The Harder They Fall (1956), with Humphrey Bogart and Rod Steiger; and the gangster boss Little Bonaparte (a parody of Rico/Little Caesar) in Billy Wilder's film Some Like It Hot (1959), and he appeared again with Steiger in Al Capone (also 1959). He also appeared in supporting roles in films such as The Comancheros (1961) and The Greatest Story Ever Told (1965).

Persoff, alongside Dean Stockwell and Andrew Bloch, appeared as Darius the Great's wicked Babylonian administrators in the 1978 Greatest Heroes of the Bible episode Daniel in the Lions' Den.

In the film Yentl (1983), Persoff portrayed the father of Barbra Streisand's character. He appeared in the comedy film Twins (1988) and in the American Tail animated-film series as Papa Mousekewitz. His last movie was 4 Faces (1999), the last film to be directed by Ted Post.

His acting career included many appearances in television series, including six episodes of The Untouchables, three episodes of which he appeared as Jake "Greasy Thumb" Guzik (regarded by many as his signature role), and Gilligan's Island as the title character in the episode "The Little Dictator" (the favorite episode of the show's creator Sherwood Schwartz). Persoff appeared on the Star Trek: The Next Generation episode "The Most Toys" and was the oldest living male actor to appear in a Star Trek production at the time of his death.

=== Retirement and memoir ===
Persoff retired from acting in 2003 and pursued painting, specializing in watercolors.

His memoir, The Many Faces of Nehemiah, was published by The Autumn Road Company in July 2021.

== Personal life ==
In 1951, Persoff married Thia Persov, who had served as a nurse with the Palmach, the elite fighting force of the Haganah, during the 1948 Arab–Israeli War. He met her while visiting Israel. She died of cancer in 2021. The couple had four children: Jeffrey, Dan, Perry, and Dahlia.

== Death ==
On April 5, 2022, at the age of 102, Persoff died of heart failure at a rehabilitation facility in San Luis Obispo, California.

== Filmography ==
=== Film ===
Year	Title	Role	Director(s)
1948	The Naked City	Smiling Man Departing Subway	Jules Dassin
1954	On the Waterfront	Cab Driver	Elia Kazan
1956	The Harder They Fall	Leo	Mark Robson
1956	The Wrong Man	Gene Conforti	Alfred Hitchcock
1956	The Wild Party	Kicks Johnson	Harry Horner
1957	Men in War	SFC Nate Lewis	Anthony Mann
1957	Street of Sinners	Leon	William Berke
1957	This Angry Age	Albert	René Clément
1958	The Badlanders	Vincente	Delmer Daves
1959	Never Steal Anything Small	Pinelli	Charles Lederer
1959	Green Mansions	Don Panta	Mel Ferrer
1959	Some Like It Hot	Little Bonaparte	Billy Wilder
1959	Al Capone	Johnny Torrio	Richard Wilson
1959	Day of the Outlaw	Dan	Andre de Toth
1961	The Big Show	Bruno Everard	James B. Clark
1961	The Comancheros	Graile	Michael Curtiz; John Wayne
1963	The Hook	Captain Van Ryn	George Seaton
1964	A Global Affair	Under Secretary Segura	Jack Arnold
1964	Fate Is the Hunter	Ben Sawyer	Ralph Nelson
1965	The Greatest Story Ever Told	Shemiah	George Stevens
1967	Too Many Thieves	Georgi	Abner Biberman
1968	The Money Jungle	Lieutenant Dow Reeves	Francis D. Lyon
1968	The Day of the Owl	Pizzuco	Damiano Damiani
1968	The Power	Professor Carl Melnicker	Byron Haskin
1968	Panic in the City	August Best	Eddie Davis
1969	The Girl Who Knew Too Much	Lieutenant Miles Crawford	Francis D. Lyon
1970	The People Next Door	Dr. Salazar	David Greene
1971	Mrs. Pollifax-Spy	Berisha	Leslie H. Martinson
1971	Red Sky at Morning	Amadeo Montoya	James Goldstone
1972	Lapin 360	Unknown	Robert Michael Lewis
1975	Psychic Killer	Dr. Gubner	Ray Danton
1976	Voyage of the Damned	Mr. Hauser	Stuart Rosenberg
1977	Deadly Harvest	Mort Logan	Timothy Bond
1979	In Search of Historic Jesus	Herod Antipas	Henning Schellerup
1981	St. Helens	Mr. Ellison	Ernest Pintoff
1982	O'Hara's Wife	Dr. Fischer	William Bartman
1983	Yentl	Rebbe Mendel (Papa)	Barbra Streisand
1986	An American Tail	Papa Mousekewitz (voice)	Don Bluth
1988	The Last Temptation of Christ	Rabbi	Martin Scorsese
1988	Twins	Mitchell Traven	Ivan Reitman
1991	An American Tail: Fievel Goes West	Papa Mousekewitz (voice)	Phil Nibbelink; Simon Wells
1998	An American Tail: The Treasure of Manhattan Island	Papa Mousekewitz (voice)	Larry Latham
1999	An American Tail: The Mystery of the Night Monster	Papa Mousekewitz (voice)	Larry Latham
2001	4 Faces	Unknown	Ted Post

=== Television ===
Year	Title	Role	Notes
1949	Actors Studio	Unknown	
1953	Suspense	Unknown	
1953–1954	You Are There	Captain de Sandoval	
1953–1954	Goodyear Television Playhouse	Papa / Joe Marco	
1953–1955	The Philco Television Playhouse	Various	
1954–1955	The Stranger	Unknown	
1954–1956	Armstrong Circle Theatre	The Man / Jeff Gardell	
1955	The Man Behind the Badge	Unknown	
1955	Appointment with Adventure	Various	
1955	I Spy	Phineas	
1955–1957	Producers' Showcase	Various	
1955–1958	The United States Steel Hour	Various	
1956	Playwrights '56	Adam	
1956	The Kaiser Aluminum Hour	Leonard Brill	
1956–1957	Kraft Television Theatre	Mr. Arnothy	
1957	The Alcoa Hour	Willie Hauptmann	
1957	Alfred Hitchcock Presents	Ralph Collins	Season 3 Episode 4: "Heart of Gold"
1957–1960	Playhouse 90	Various	
1958	Climax!	Lieutenant Cal Nourse	
1958	Schlitz Playhouse of Stars	Jules Dreise	
1958	Shirley Temple's Storybook	Ali Baba	
1959	The Third Man	Sandor Varnezki	
1959	Five Fingers	Hildalgo	
1959	Mr. Lucky	El Presidente	
1959	The Twilight Zone	Carl Lanser	Episode: "Judgment Night"
1959–1962	The Untouchables	Various	6 episodes
1959–1963	Naked City	Various	
1960	Startime	Prior Andry	
1960	Alfred Hitchcock Presents	Jeff Jensen	Season 5 Episode 17: "The Cure"
1960	Moment of Fear	Unknown	
1960	The Witness	Charles Becker	
1961	Thriller	Lieutenant Jim Wagner	
1961	Wagon Train	Tiburcio Mendez	
1961	Route 66	Jack / Vladis Dvorovoi	
1961	Bus Stop	Dr. Emil Kroger	
1962	The Dick Powell Show	El Valiente	
1962	King of Diamonds	Frank Goby	
1962	The New Breed	Louis Morley	
1962	Frontier Circus	Paco Durando	
1963	Sam Benedict	Vernon Hill	
1963–1964	Rawhide	Michob / Domingo	
1964–1965	Bob Hope Presents the Chrysler Theatre	Alverian / Martin Vesper	
1964–1965	Burke's Law	Various	
1965	Mr. Novak	Henry Selkirk	
1965	For the People	Stephen Wiseman	
1965	Seaway	Montagna	
1965	Gilligan's Island	Pancho Hernando Gonzalez Enriques Rodriguez	Episode: "The Little Dictator"
1965	Ben Casey	Don Ferando	
1965	Convoy	Dimitri Federenko	
1965	A Man Called Shenandoah	Father Rodriguez	
1965–1968	The Wild Wild West	Major Hazard	Episode: "The Night of the Underground Terror"
1965–1975	Gunsmoke	Jack Pinto / Alex Skouras / Driscoll / Ben Rando / Alejo Etchahoun	6 episodes
1966	The Legend of Jesse James	El Carnicero	
1966	Voyage to the Bottom of the Sea	Dobbs	
1966	Honey West	Faustini - Bogus Mystic	
1966	The Trials of O'Brien	Georgi	
1966	The Big Valley	General Vicente Ruiz	Episode: "Legend of A General, Part 1 & 2"
1966	Jericho	Paul Marchand	
1966	The Time Tunnel	Professor Anton Biraki	
1966–1967	I Spy	Roop / Coly Collisi	
1966	Mission: Impossible	Prince Iben Kostas	Episode: "Odds on Evil"
1967	The Man from U.N.C.L.E.	Valandros	
1967	Off to See the Wizard	El Primero	
1967	The Danny Thomas Hour	Lew Beckman	
1967	Maya	Lansing, the Pilot	
1967	The Wild Wild West	Adam Barclay	Season 2, Episode 25: "The Night of The Deadly Blossom"
1968	Tarzan	Chembe Kunji	
1968	CBS Playhouse	Dr. Salazar	
1968	The Name of the Game	Ambassador	
1968–1972	The Wonderful World of Disney	Artie Moreno / Captain Malcione	
1968–1979	Hawaii Five-O	Various	Episode: "Deathwatch"
1969	Mission: Impossible	Igor Stravos	Episode: "Fool's Gold"
1969	Mission: Impossible	Phillipe Pereda	Episode: "The Vault"
1969	It Takes a Thief	Harry Lavender	
1969	Corwin	Unknown	
1969	The Flying Nun	Alonzo Baldazon	
1969	The Bill Cosby Show	Mr. Byron	
1969	Land of the Giants	Titus	
1969–1972	The Mod Squad	Various	
1969–1975	Marcus Welby, M.D.	Various	
1970	Cutter's Trail	Santillo	TV movie
1970	Dan August	Leo Cussoni	
1970	The High Chaparral	Homero José	
1970–1973	Love, American Style	Carl Colbert / Mr. Stone	
1970–1973	Insight	Bishop Palmera / Mr. Gennaro	
1971	The Chicago Teddy Bears	Morris	
1972	Adam-12	Angelo Covelli	
1972	Cool Million	Karinakis	
1972	Mannix	Anton Wojeska	
1972	The Streets of San Francisco	'Papa' Kampacalas	
1973	Search	Emmett Brugman	
1973	Purple Playhouse	Dr. Van Helsing	
1973	Dr. Simon Locke	Mr. John Warren	
1973–1977	McCloud	Tereshkov / Perry Cicero	
1974	McMillan & Wife	Clementa Habib	
1974	The Stranger Within	Dr. Edward Klein	TV movie
1974	The Missiles of October	Andrei Gromyko	TV movie
1974–1979	Police Story	Dr. Burke / Fabrizzio	
1975	The Invisible Man	Dr. Leon Barnard	
1975	Ellery Queen	Dr. Mustafa Haddid	
1976	Columbo	Jesse Jerome	Episode: "Now You See Him"
1976	Baretta	Vittorio Luzianno	
1977	The Six Million Dollar Man	Major Popov	
1977	Wonder Woman	Professor Moreno	
1977	Rich Man, Poor Man Book II	Charles Dietrich	
1977	Hunter	Sheik Farakbi	
1977	Quincy, M.E.	Matt Dorsey	
1977	Charlie's Angels	Anton	
1977	Police Woman	Como	
1978	Logan's Run	Asa	
1978	Little House on the Prairie	Mr. Olaf Lindstrom	Episode: "The Stranger"
1978	High Hopes	Dr. Aaron Herzog	
1978	The Bionic Woman	Dr. Philip Jennings	
1978	Richie Brockelman, Private Eye	Saul Girardi	
1978	Ziegfeld: The Man and His Women	Charles Frohman	TV movie
1978	Sword of Justice	Carlos	
1978	Vega$	The Sheikh	
1978	The Word	Abbot Petropolous	
1978	The Hardy Boys/Nancy Drew Mysteries	Vladimir	
1978–1980	Fantasy Island	Andreas / Horst Von Stern	
1978–1981	Barney Miller	Carl Simms / Yacov Berger	3 episodes
1979	Delta House	Mayor DePasto	
1979	Supertrain	Max	
1979	Battlestar Galactica	Eastern Alliance Leader	
1979	The Rebels	Baron Von Steuben	
1979	The Thirteenth Day: The Story of Esther	Mordecai	TV movie
1979	The French Atlantic Affair	Colonel Schreiner	
1980	B.A.D. Cats	Unknown	
1980	Matt and Jenny	Barnabas Bletcher	
1980	The Littlest Hobo	Lukash	
1980	F.D.R.: The Last Year	Joseph Stalin	TV movie
1980	Condominium	Conlaw	
1983	This Is the Life	Unknown	
1983	Sadat	Leonid Brezhnev	
1984	Scarecrow and Mrs. King	Brobich	
1985	Magnum, P.I.	Rabbi Asher Solomon	
1985	Hotel	Nicholas Petrovsky	
1986	The Facts of Life	Sam	
1986	Highway to Heaven	Deputy Premier Andrey Malinoff	
1987	Adderly	Unknown	
1987	J.J. Starbuck	Patul Batulik	
1988	American Playhouse	Marcus Hoff	
1989	MacGyver	Sam Bolinski	
1990	L.A. Law	Rabbi Isadore Glickman	
1990	Star Trek: The Next Generation	Toff	Episode: "The Most Toys"
1990	Hunter	Harold Goodman	
1990	Murder, She Wrote	Constantin Stavros	
1992	Doogie Howser, M.D.	Max Wernick	
1993	Reasonable Doubts	Klaus Reichel	
1993	Law & Order	David Steinmetz	
1995	Chicago Hope	Rabbi Ben Taubler	
1996	Tracey Takes On...	Grandfather	
2003	Angels in America	Rabbi	Episode: "Millennium Approaches: Bad News"; uncredited

== See also ==
- Jews in the American film industry
- List of centenarians (actors, filmmakers and entertainers)
