= David Kirschner =

American producer and screenwriter

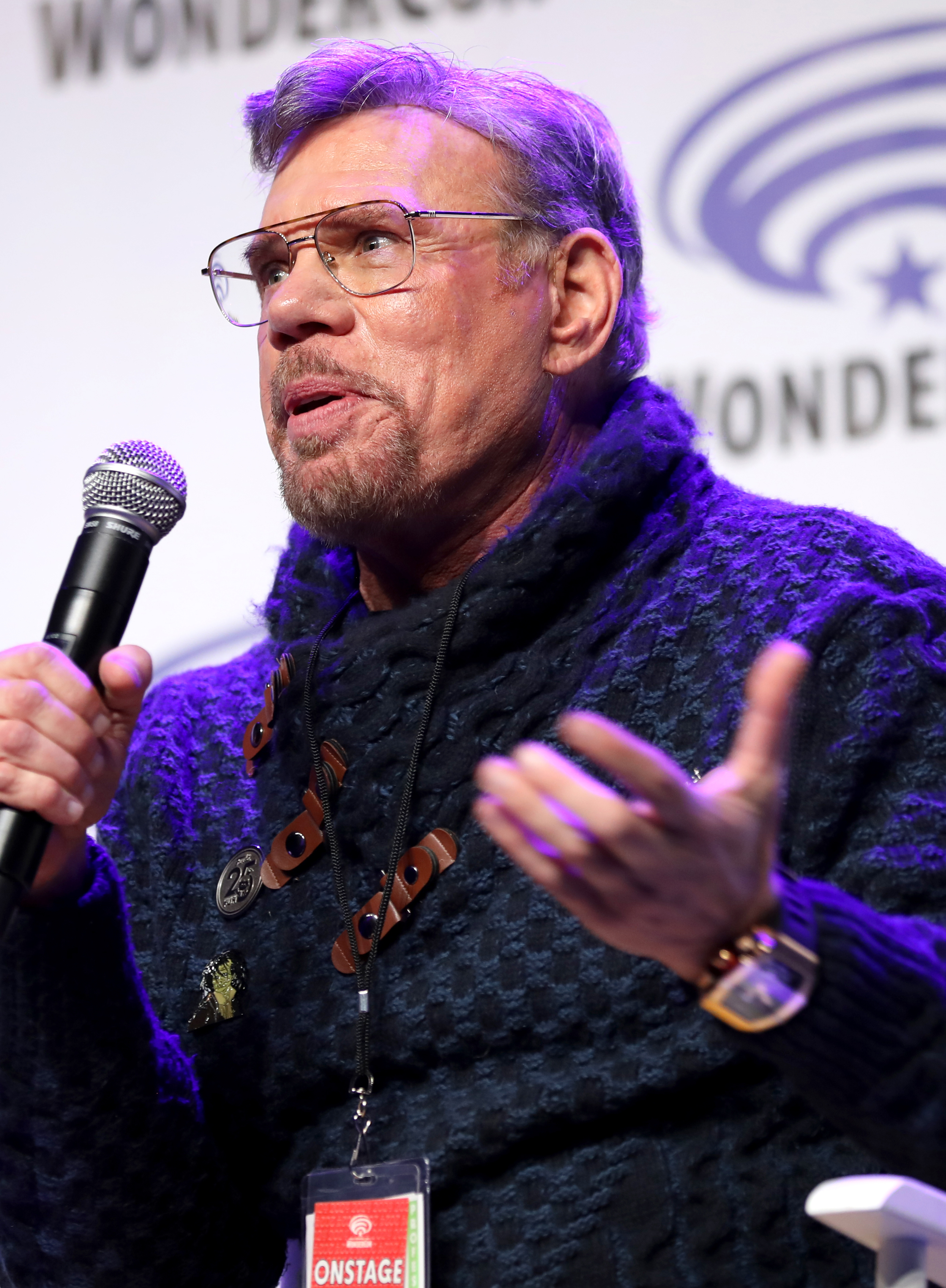
- Kirschner at the 2024 WonderCon
- Born: David Maxwell Kirschner; May 29, 1955 (age 71); Los Angeles, California, U.S.
- Education: USC School of Cinematic Arts
- Occupations: Film producer; television producer; screenwriter
- Years active: 1983–present

David Maxwell Kirschner (born May 29, 1955) is an American film and television producer and screenwriter. His producing credits include Don Bluth's An American Tail (also wrote) and Titan A.E. animated features as well as Cats Don't Dance, Curious George, the Child's Play horror franchise.

== Career ==
After studying at the University of Southern California School of Cinematic Arts, Kirschner began his career designing album cover art for Neil Diamond, including The Jazz Singer, and illustrating characters for the Muppets and Sesame Street. In 1983, Kirschner created and released children's book series Rose Petal Place, which spawned two Television specials, toys, clothing, and a wide array of licensed consumer products. In 1986, Kirschner created and executive produced An American Tail, which was co-executive produced by Steven Spielberg, and, at its release, was the highest-grossing non-Disney produced animated feature of all time. It was followed by its theatrical sequel An American Tail: Fievel Goes West (1991), the television series Fievel's American Tails, and two direct-to-video sequels. In 1986, David Kirschner signed a deal with United Artists Pictures and MGM/UA Television for development, production and distribution of major motion picture and television projects for a two-year deal. Kirschner was appointed chairman of Hanna-Barbera Productions in 1989, where he wrote / created and executive produced many films, specials and shows, including Wake, Rattle & Roll, Gravedale High and The Pirates of Dark Water.

Kirschner also designed the Chucky animatronic doll which is featured in the Child's Play series. He has produced all seven films in the original franchise, as well as executive producing the Chucky television series. In 1993, he left Hanna-Barbera and attempted to start a partnership with Michael Jackson at 20th Century Fox, but never got off the ground. In 1993, he and his producing partner Paul Gertz had delivered a deal with Turner Pictures to develop two features, but only one was released. Other notable productions include 1997's Cats Don't Dance, winner of the 25th annual Annie Award for Best Animated Feature, 2006's Curious George, based upon the book series of the same name, Martian Child, and Golden Globe-nominated Miss Potter. His 2010s/2020s work includes executive producer on Curious George, Hocus Pocus 2 (Disney+), Random (In Pre-Production for The Weinstein Company) and Garden District (In-Development for Dimension Films). Kirschner is currently head of his own production company, David Kirschner Productions.

== Filmography ==
=== Films ===
Title	Year	Functioned as			Notes
Title	Year	Producer	Executive producer	Writer	Notes
An American Tail	1986	No	Yes	Creator / Story	Animated
Child's Play	1988	Yes	No	No	
Child's Play 2	1990	Yes	No	No	
Child's Play 3	1991	No	Yes	No	
An American Tail: Fievel Goes West	1991	No	Yes	Creator	Animated
Once Upon a Forest	1993	Yes	No	No	Animated
Hocus Pocus	1993	Yes	No	Story	
The Flintstones	1994	No	Yes	No	
The Pagemaster	1994	Yes	No	Yes	Live action / animated
Cats Don't Dance	1997	Yes	No	No	Animated
Bride of Chucky	1998	Yes	No	No	
Titan A.E.	2000	Yes	No	No	Animated
Frailty	2001	Yes	No	No	
Secondhand Lions	2003	Yes	No	No	
Seed of Chucky	2004	Yes	No	No	
Thru the Moebius Strip	2005	Yes	No	No	Animated
Curious George	2006	Yes	No	No	Animated
Miss Potter	2006	Yes	No	No	
Martian Child	2007	Yes	No	No	
Curious George 2: Follow That Monkey!	2009	No	Yes	No	Animated / Direct-to-DVD
Curse of Chucky	2013	Yes	No	No	Direct-to-DVD
Kristy	2014	Yes	No	No	
Curious George 3: Back to the Jungle	2015	No	Yes	No	Animated / Direct-to-DVD
Cult of Chucky	2017	Yes	No	No	Direct-to-DVD
Curious George: Royal Monkey	2019	No	Yes	No	Animated / Direct-to-DVD
Curious George: Go West, Go Wild	2020	No	Yes	No	Animated / Direct-to-streaming
Curious George: Cape Ahoy	2021	No	Yes	No	Animated / Direct-to-streaming
Hocus Pocus 2	2022	No	Yes	Story	Direct-to-streaming

=== Television films and specials ===
Title	Year	Functioned as			Notes
Title	Year	Producer	Executive producer	Writer	Notes
Rose Petal Place	1984	Yes	No	Creator	Animated special
Rose Petal Place: Real Friends	1985	Yes	No	Creator	Animated special
...Where's Rodney?	1990	Yes	No	No	Unsold pilot
Poochinski	1990	No	Yes	Story	Unsold pilot
The Dreamer of Oz: The L. Frank Baum Story	1990	No	Yes	Story	
The Last Halloween	1991	No	Yes	No	Live action / animated special
Monster in My Pocket: The Big Scream	1992	No	Yes	No	Animated special
The Halloween Tree	1993	No	Yes	No	Animated special
The Town Santa Forgot	1993	No	Yes	No	Animated special

=== Television series ===
Title	Year(s)	Functioned as			Notes
Title	Year(s)	Creator	Executive producer	Writer	Notes
Gravedale High	1990	Yes	Yes	No	Animated (13 episodes)
Bill & Ted's Excellent Adventures	1990	No	Yes	No	Animated (13 episodes)
Wake, Rattle and Roll	1990–1991	Yes	Yes	No	Live action / animated (50 episodes)
The Pirates of Dark Water	1991–1993	Yes	Yes	No	Animated (21 episodes)
Fievel's American Tails	1992	Yes	No	No	Animated (13 episodes) / Also creative consultant
Fish Police	1992	No	Yes	No	Animated (6 episodes)
The Addams Family	1992–1993	No	Yes	No	Animated (21 episodes)
Capitol Critters	1992–1996	No	Yes	No	Animated (13 episodes)
Earth: Final Conflict	1997–2002	No	Yes	Yes	Executive producer (110 episodes) / Teleplay (Episode: "Law & Order")
Five Days to Midnight	2004	No	Yes	No	Mini-series (5 episodes)
Curious George	2006–2022	No	Yes	No	Animated (198 episodes + 3 specials)
Chucky	2021–2024	No	Yes	No	24 episodes
