= The Jimmy Stewart Museum =

Museum dedicated to Jimmy Stewart

Coordinates: 40.623136°N 79.155698°W

The Jimmy Stewart Museum is a museum dedicated to American actor James Stewart (1908–1997) that is located in Stewart's hometown of Indiana, Pennsylvania.

== Overview ==
The museum is located in the actor's hometown of Indiana, Pennsylvania on the third floor of the Indiana Public Library. The museum highlights the movie career of Stewart, including his role in the 1946 Christmas classic It's a Wonderful Life, as well as his service as a World War II bomber pilot. It contains numerous artifacts from Stewart's childhood, military career, and home life, as well as movie posters and memorabilia. Visitors can also view some of Stewart's movies in a replica 1930s theater.

Stewart himself was originally against the establishment of the museum, citing his own modesty, but was convinced by the potential financial gain of his community. The museum opened on May 20, 1995, with the actor's daughters Kelly Stewart Harcourt and Judy Stewart in attendance. Within walking distance of the museum are several other Stewart-related sites, including his birthplace, childhood home, his family's former hardware store, and the Stewart statue on the courthouse lawn. The museum is overseen by the James M. Stewart Foundation, a nonprofit organization, which also offers several events including the Harvey Award presented on the actor's birthday in May, the "It's a Wonderful Life" festival before Thanksgiving, and a light-up night in late November.

By 2013, the museum was in financial trouble due to lack of visitation and its location in rural Pennsylvania. In December of that year, however, it was reported that several donors had stepped up to make contributions. Museum Director Timothy Harley said a San Diego couple originally from western Pennsylvania began making annual $25,000 donations, matching what the Stewart family gives.
