= Cathy Cavadini =

American voice actress

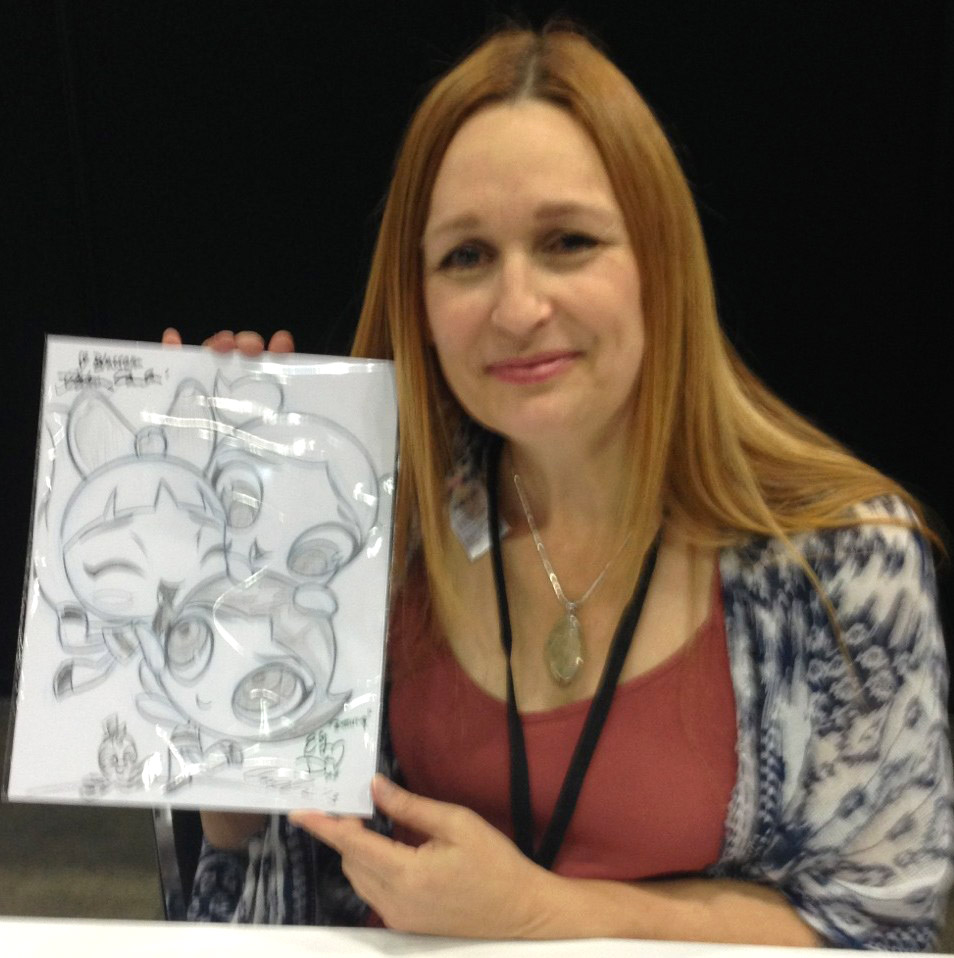
- Cavadini at the 2013 Comikaze
- Occupation: Voice actress
- Years active: 1983–present
- Children: 1
- Website: catherinecavadini.com

Catherine Cavadini is an American voice actress. She is best known as the original voice of Blossom on Cartoon Network's short series What a Cartoon! and the animated television series The Powerpuff Girls, as well as Tanya Mousekewitz in An American Tail: Fievel Goes West.

== Awards ==
In 1998, she was nominated for an Annie Award for "Outstanding Individual Achievement for Voice Acting by a Female Performer in an Animated Feature Production" for performing the voice and singing for the role of Mary in the animated movie Babes in Toyland. She also sang Dreams to Dream as the character Tanya Mousekewitz in the animated movie An American Tail: Fievel Goes West, which was nominated for Best Song at the 49th Golden Globe Awards. In addition, she has received 2 Emmy Award Certificates for contributing to Outstanding Sound on the TV series, The X-Files.

In 2003, Cavadini was honored with a White House Project Epic Award (which gives recognition to projects that promote women leadership) for her work in The Powerpuff Girls Movie as Blossom.

== Filmography ==
=== Film ===
Year	Title	Role	Notes
1985	Starchaser: The Legend of Orin	Additional voices	
1986	My Little Pony: The Movie	North Star	
1987	Jaws: The Revenge	Additional voices	
1988	Pound Puppies and the Legend of Big Paw	Charlamagne, Collette	
1991	An American Tail: Fievel Goes West	Tanya Mousekewitz	
1994	The Lion King	Additional voices	
1997	It Was My Best Birthday Ever, Charlie Brown	Mimi (singing voice)	
1997	Babes in Toyland	Mary	Nominated - Outstanding Individual Achievement for Voice Acting by a Female Performer in an Animated Feature Production
2000	Dinosaur	Lemurs	
2001	Final Fantasy: The Spirits Within	Phantoms	
2002	Lilo & Stitch	Fainting Girl	
2002	The Powerpuff Girls Movie	Blossom	
2003	Sky Blue	Jay, Young Shua, Cheyenne	
2006	Happy Feet	Additional voices	
2007	Garfield Gets Real	Daisy Girl	
2008	The Other End of the Line	Jennifer David	
2009	Garfield's Pet Force	Additional voices	
2010	Cats & Dogs: The Revenge of Kitty Galore	Christmas Lady	
2011	All-Star Superman	Floral	Direct-to-video
2011	Scooby-Doo! Legend of the Phantosaur	Faith	Direct-to-video
2011	Happy Feet Two	Additional voices	
2012	Batman: The Dark Knight Returns	Joanie	Direct-to-video
2015	Spy	Additional voices	
2016	Sing	Additional voices	
2018	Ready Player One	IOI P.A.	
2018	Incredibles 2	Welch, TV Anchor	
2018	The Grinch	Additional voices	
2019	Ford v Ferrari	Additional voices	
2019	Klaus	Additional voices	
2020	Love and Monsters	Additional voices	
2020	Japan Sinks: 2020	Kanae Murota	Credited as Catherine Cavadini
2020	Soul	Dreamerwind	
2021	Wish Dragon	Additional voices	
2022	Minions: The Rise of Gru	Additional voices	

=== Television ===
Year	Title	Role	Notes
1983	Mister T	Skye Redfern	Episode: "Mystery of the Forbidden Monastery"
1983	Spider-Man and His Amazing Friends	Ariel	Episode: "Spidey Meets the Girl from Tomorrow"
1984–1985	Kidd Video	Glitter	
1985–1988	Jem	Clash	
1987	My Little Pony	Ariel	Episode: "Flight to Cloud Castle"
1990	Fox's Peter Pan & the Pirates	Cecilia	Episode: "Hook's Christmas"
1991	Darkwing Duck	Woman on Street	Episode: "Time and Punishment"
1991–1992	Back to the Future	Jennifer Parker	
1995–1996	What a Cartoon!	Blossom	2 episodes
1997	Duckman	Paperboy	Episode: "All About Elliott"
1997	Adventures from the Book of Virtues	Sarah West, Snake Mother	Episode: "Friendship"
1998–2005	The Powerpuff Girls	Blossom, various voices	Main role
2001	Jackie Chan Adventures	Abila	Episode: "Lost City of the Muntabs"
2001–2002	What's with Andy?	Mom	
2002	Justice League	Dr. Mary	Episode: "The Brave and the Bold"
2004	Johnny Bravo	Sweet Mama, Workout Chick, Cheerleader, Sandy	2 episodes
2004	Teen Titans	Cirolneilien Chrysalis Hunter	Episode: "Transformation"
2004	The Batman	Wife, Movie Star, Reporter	Episode: "The Big Chill"
2004	My Life as a Teenage Robot	Girl	Episode: "A Robot for All Seasons"
2004	Justice League Unlimited	Katie	Episode: "Dark Heart"
2005	Duck Dodgers	Cheerleader	Episode: "The Kids Are All Wrong"
2007	Ben 10	Cooper Daniels	Episode: "Ben 10 vs. the Negative 10"
2009–2011	Batman: The Brave and the Bold	Alanna, Jan, Ruby Ryder, Fiona, Myrra Rhodes	3 episodes
2013	The Cleveland Show	Siri	Episode: "Grave Danger"
2014	Doc McStuffins	Dart	Episode: "Run Doc Run!"
2016–2017	The Tom and Jerry Show	Toodles' Mom	3 episodes
2017	Michael Jackson's Halloween	Additional voices	Television film
2021	The Way of the Househusband	Miku's Mother	English dub
2021–2022	Kid Cosmic	Agent Pink	3 episodes
2025	Jellystone!	Blossom	Episode: "Crisis on Infinite Mirths"
TBA	Damian Ghostkeeper	Additional voices	Pilot; Also Voice Director

=== Video games ===
Year	Title	Role	Notes
2001	The Powerpuff Girls: Mojo Jojo's Pet Project	Blossom	
2001	The Powerpuff Girls: Chemical X-Traction	Blossom	
2002	Final Fantasy X	Calli	
2002	The Powerpuff Girls: Mojo Jojo's Clone Zone	Blossom	
2002	The Powerpuff Girls: Relish Rampage	Blossom	
2005	Gun	Sadie	
2006	Happy Feet	Norma Jean	
2006	Cartoon Network Racing	Blossom	
2007	The Golden Compass	Vala, Nurses	
2007	Lost Odyssey	Additional voices	
2008	Jumper: Griffin's Story	Griffin's Mom, Dr. Hoffstader, Assassin	
2009	FusionFall	Blossom	
2009	Final Fantasy XIII	Cocoon Inhabitants	
2010	White Knight Chronicles	Kara	
2011	White Knight Chronicles II	Kara	
2011	Cartoon Network: Punch Time Explosion	Blossom	
2011	Final Fantasy XIII-2	Additional voices	
2014	Broken Age	Candle Maiden, Car'l, Twyla	
2014	Adventure Time: Secret of the Nameless Kingdom	Lullaby Princess	
2014	WildStar	Mechari Female	
2016	Lego Star Wars: The Force Awakens	Village Chief, Takodana Mercenary, Rebel Pilot	
2017	Dishonored: Death of the Outsider	Aristocrats	
2018	Lego The Incredibles	Brainfreezer	
2020	Final Fantasy VII Remake	Jessie's Mother	
2020	The Walking Dead: Onslaught	Driver	
2023	Redfall	Anna Creelman	
2024	MultiVersus	Blossom	
2024	A Quiet Place: The Road Ahead	Laura	
