= Erica Yohn =

American actress (1928–2019)

- Born: Adella Erica Fishman; October 1, 1928; The Bronx, New York, U.S.
- Died: January 27, 2019 (aged 90); North Hollywood, California, U.S.
- Occupation: Actress
- Known for: An American Tail series
- Spouse(s): Lars Speyer (1950–19??; divorced); Tom Rosqui (August 18, 1963 – April 12, 1991; his death)
- Children: 3

Erica Yohn (October 1, 1928 – January 27, 2019) was an American stage and television actress.

Yohn had many bit parts in film and television, such as Pee-wee's Big Adventure, and television shows, such as Rhoda, ER, Murphy Brown, Double Rush, and Picket Fences. She voiced Mama Mousekewitz in An American Tail and its first two sequels.

From 1971 to 1972, she was a member of the Broadway cast of Lenny, playing various roles, including Sadie Kitchenberg alias Sally Marr, the mother of Lenny Bruce, directed by Tom O'Horgan. She also appeared on Broadway in the original play That Summer - That Fall (1967), an English-language revival of Federico García Lorca's play Yerma (1966–67), the musical Cabaret (1966–69), and revivals of such classics as The Alchemist (1966) and The Country Wife (1965–66).

== Personal life and death ==
Yohn was born Adella (later known as "Adele") Erica Fishman, the younger child of Jacob and Sonia Fishman; she had an elder brother, Marcus. Yohn was married at least two times. She had three children, Lara Gita Speyer and David Speyer, by her marriage to Lars Speyer, and a son, Yohn Rosqui, by her marriage to Tom Rosqui. Erica Yohn died on January 27, 2019, aged 90, of undisclosed causes.

== Partial filmography ==
Year	Title	Role	Notes
1974	The Godfather Part II	Governess	
1975	The Dream Makers	Helen	
1979	The Thirteenth Day: The Story of Esther	Sura	Television film
1981	S.O.B.	Agnes - Costume Designer	
1983	Star 80	Interviewer	
1985	Roadhouse 66	Thelma	
1985	Pee-wee's Big Adventure	Madam Ruby	
1985	Night Court	Madam Loretta	Episode: The Gypsy
1986	An American Tail	Mama Mousekewitz	voice
1987	Amazon Women on the Moon	Selma	segment "Murray in Videoland"
1991	An American Tail: Fievel Goes West	Mama Mousekewitz	voice
1993	Jack the Bear	Mother-in-Law	
1994	Corrina, Corrina	Grandma Eva	
1998	An American Tail: The Treasure of Manhattan Island	Mama Mousekewitz	voice
