= An American Tail =

1986 film by Don Bluth

- Theatrical release poster by Drew Struzan
- Directed by: Don Bluth
- Screenplay by: Judy Freudberg; Tony Geiss
- Story by: David Kirschner; Judy Freudberg; Tony Geiss
- Produced by: Don Bluth; Gary Goldman; John Pomeroy
- Starring: Cathianne Blore; Dom DeLuise; John Finnegan; Phillip Glasser; Amy Green; Madeline Kahn; Pat Musick; Nehemiah Persoff; Christopher Plummer; Neil Ross; Will Ryan; Hal Smith; Erica Yohn
- Edited by: Dan Molina
- Music by: James Horner
- Production companies: Amblin Entertainment; Sullivan Bluth Studios; U-Drive Productions
- Distributed by: Universal Pictures
- Release date: November 21, 1986
- Running time: 80 minutes
- Countries: United States; Ireland
- Language: English
- Budget: $9 million
- Box office: $84.5 million

An American Tail is a 1986 animated musical comedy-drama film directed by Don Bluth and written by Judy Freudberg and Tony Geiss. It stars the voices of Cathianne Blore, Dom DeLuise, John Finnegan, Phillip Glasser, Amy Green, Madeline Kahn, Pat Musick, Nehemiah Persoff, Christopher Plummer, Neil Ross, Will Ryan, Hal Smith, and Erica Yohn. Set in the late 19th century, the story follows the Mousekewitzes, a family of Russian-Jewish mice emigrating from the Russian Empire to the United States for freedom. Fievel, the youngest of the Mousekewitz family, gets lost and must find a way to reunite with them.

Production on An American Tail commenced in December 1984 and was originally conceived as a television special; executive producer Steven Spielberg felt it had potential as a feature film, and asked Bluth to "make [him] something pretty like [he] did in NIMH." The film was animated at Sullivan Bluth Studios, with James Horner composing the film's score and writing original songs.

An American Tail was theatrically released in the United States on November 21, 1986, by Universal Pictures. It received mixed reviews from critics and was a commercial success, grossing $85 million worldwide on a $9 million budget. The success spawned a franchise, including a theatrical sequel, a television series, and two sequels released on home video.

== Plot ==
In 1885 Shostka, Russian Empire, the Mousekewitzes are a Russian-Jewish family of mice who live with a human family named Moskowitz. While celebrating Hanukkah, Papa gives his kashket to his son, Fievel, and tells him about the United States, a country in which he believes there are no cats. The celebration is interrupted when a battery of Cossacks ride through the village square in an anti-Semitic arson attack and their cats attack the village mice. The Moskowitz home, along with that of the Mousekewitzes, is destroyed, while Fievel narrowly escapes from the cats. They flee the village in search of a better life.

In Hamburg, Germany, the Mousekewitzes board a tramp steamer, setting sail for New York City. All the mice aboard are ecstatic at the prospect of going to America, believing that there are "no cats" there. During a thunderstorm on their journey, Fievel finds himself separated from his family and washed overboard. Thinking that he has died, they proceed to the city as planned, though they become depressed at his loss.

However, Fievel floats to New York in a bottle and, after a pep talk from a French pigeon named Henri, decides to look for his family. He encounters conman Warren T. Rat, who sells him to a sweatshop. He escapes with Tony Toponi, a street-smart Italian mouse, and they join up with Bridget, an Irish mouse trying to rouse her fellow mice to fight the cats. When a cat gang called the Mott Street Maulers attacks a mouse marketplace, the immigrant mice learn that the tales of a cat-free country are not true; and that Warren T. Rat is demanding payment for protection from them.

Bridget takes Fievel and Tony to see Honest John, an alcoholic politician who knows the city's voting mice. However, he is unable to help Fievel search for his family, as they have not yet registered to vote. Led by the rich Gussie Mausheimer, the mice hold a rally to decide what to do about the cats. Warren is extorting them all for protection that he never provides. No one knows what to do about it until Fievel whispers a plan to Gussie. Although his family also attends, they stand well in the back of the audience, and they are unable to recognize Fievel onstage with her.

The mice take over an abandoned museum on the Chelsea Piers and begin constructing their plan. On the day of launch, Fievel gets lost and stumbles upon Warren's lair. He discovers that he is actually a cat in disguise and the leader of the Maulers. They capture and imprison Fievel, but his guard is a reluctant member of the gang, a vegetarian tabby cat named Tiger, who befriends and frees him.

Fievel races back to the pier with the cats chasing after him and exposes Warren as a cat when Gussie orders the mice to release the secret weapon. A huge mechanical mouse, inspired by the bedtime tales Papa told Fievel of the "Giant Mouse of Minsk", chases Warren and his gang down the pier and into the water. A tramp steamer bound for Hong Kong picks them up on its anchor and carries them away. However, a pile of leaking kerosene cans has caused a torch lying on the ground to ignite the pier, and the mice are forced to flee when the fire department arrives to extinguish it.

During the fire, Fievel is once again separated from his family and ends up at an orphanage in an alley. Papa and Tanya overhear Bridget and Tony calling out to Fievel. Papa is sure that there is another "Fievel" somewhere, until Mama finds his hat. Joined by Gussie, Tiger allows them to ride him. This allows them to find Fievel. Papa returns Fievel's hat, commenting that it now fits him, and he has grown up into a mouse. Henri ends the journey by taking everyone to see his newly completed project—the Statue of Liberty, which appears to smile and wink at Fievel and Tanya, and the Mouskewitzes' new life in the United States begins.

== Voice cast ==
- Phillip Glasser as Fievel Mousekewitz. While "Fievel" is a generally accepted spelling of his name, and appears as such in the end credits, the opening credits spell it as "Feivel", the more common transliteration of the Yiddish name (פֿײַװל Fayvl) (Cf. Shraga Feivel Mendlowitz and Feivel Gruberger). The main protagonist, he is the only son of Papa and Mama Mousekewitz. A high-spirited, daring yet naïve baby mouse, Fievel becomes a frightened child when he is separated from his family. The strength and the encouragement from his new American friends from Henri to Tony and Bridget give him the fortitude to reach his goal in reuniting with his family while starting a new life in America. Feivel was the name of Steven Spielberg's grandfather, whose stories as an immigrant influenced the film. However, many English-speaking writers have come to adopt the spelling Fievel, especially for this character; this spelling was used on the film's poster, in promotional materials and tie-in merchandise, and in the title of the sequel An American Tail: Fievel Goes West. His last name is a play on the Russian-Jewish last name "Moskowitz", the name of the human occupants of the house his family is living under at the beginning of the film.
- John Finnegan as Warren T. Rat, a small Havana Brown who disguises himself as a giant rat. He is the leader of the Mott Street Maulers, an all-cat gang which terrorizes the mice of New York City. Conniving and a schemer, he misleads the impressionable Fievel at one point. Later on, he gets his comeuppance when Fievel discovers and later exposes him as a cat to the Mouse community. He is accompanied everywhere by his accountant Digit, a small English-accented cockroach.
- Amy Green as Tanya Mousekewitz (singing voice provided by Betsy Cathcart), Fievel's older sister, whom he mutually adores. Optimistic and cheerful, less daring but more obedient than her brother, she alone believes (correctly) that he survived being washed overboard en route to the United States. She is given the American name "Tillie" at the immigration point at Castle Garden.
- Nehemiah Persoff as Papa Mousekewitz, the head of the Mousekewitz family who plays the violin and tells stories to his children.
- Erica Yohn as Mama Mousekewitz, Fievel's mother. Countering Papa's dreamy idealism, she is a level-headed pragmatist, besides being stricter with their offspring than he is. She also has a fear of flying.
- Pat Musick as Tony Toponi, a streetwise teenage mouse of Italian descent. His "tough guy" attitude suits his New York surroundings. The name "Toponi" is a play on "topo", the Italian word for "mouse". He hits it off with Fievel, acting as a surrogate big brother to the younger mouse, whom he calls "Fillie". In a subplot, he falls in love with Bridget.
- Dom DeLuise as Tiger, the most physically imposing member of the Mott Street Maulers, for whom he serves as an enforcer, and often is the brunt of their cruel jokes. Although not especially intelligent, Tiger is very friendly, and his warm nature endears him to mice and birds. He is mostly vegetarian, aside from the occasional bit of fish. Tiger becomes Fievel's best friend. He enjoys card games like poker and gin rummy, despite being terrible at them.
- Christopher Plummer as Henri le Pigeon, a pigeon of French descent, who oversees construction of the Statue of Liberty.
- Cathianne Blore as Bridget, an attractive, elegant Irish-born mouse and Tony's love interest. Her parents were slain and devoured by the Mott Street Maulers, making her an advocate in speaking out against the cats. Kind, passionate yet soft-spoken, she acts as a surrogate big sister to Fievel.
- Neil Ross as Honest John, a local Irish-born mouse politician who knows every voting mouse in New York City. An ambulance-chasing drunkard, he takes advantage of voters' concerns to increase his political prestige. John is a caricature of real-life Tammany Hall boss John Kelly (also nicknamed "Honest John") and other 19th-century New York City politicians.
- Madeline Kahn as Gussie Mausheimer, a German-born mouse considered the richest in New York City, who rallies the mice into fighting back against the cats. Despite being against cats, she later accepts Tiger for helping reunite Fievel with his family.
- Will Ryan as Digit, Warren's British cockroach accountant who has a fondness for counting money but is plagued by frequent electrical charges in his antennae whenever he gets nervous or excited.
- Hal Smith as Moe, a fat rat who runs the local sweatshop. Fievel is sold to him by Warren.
- Dan Kuenster as Jake, Warren's burly aide-de-camp. Among the Mott Street Maulers, he alone enjoys listening to his leader's violin music. Jake catches Fievel after a chase through the sewers. After Tiger takes pity on Fievel and sets him free, Jake and his fellow Maulers pursue the young mouse to the Chelsea Pier, only to face the "Giant Mouse of Minsk".

== Production ==
=== Development ===
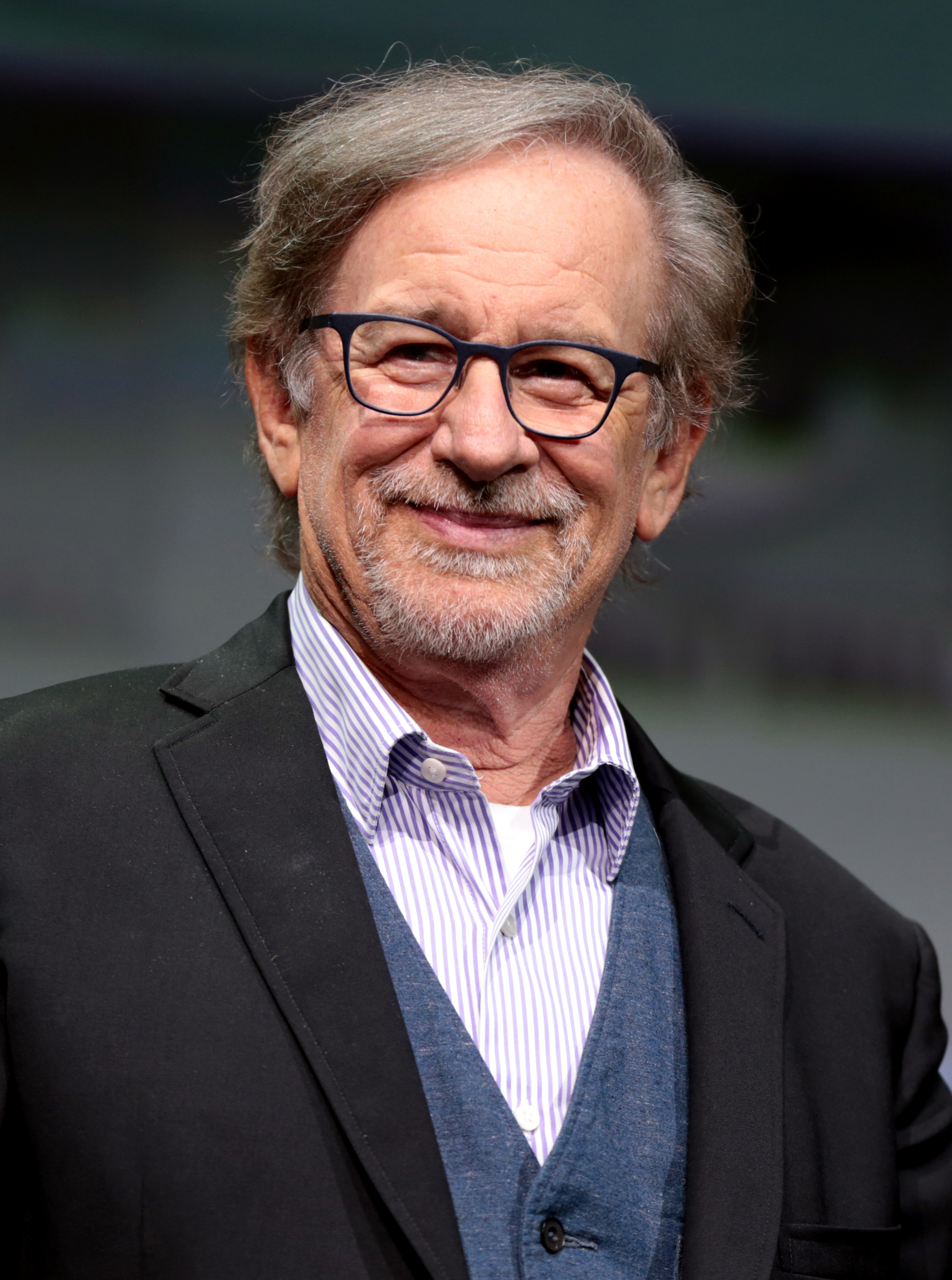
Executive producer Steven Spielberg in 2017

Production began in December 1984 as a collaboration between Spielberg, Bluth, and Universal, based on a concept by David Kirschner. Originally, the idea was conceived as a television special, but Spielberg felt it had potential as a feature film. Spielberg had asked Bluth to "make me something pretty like you did in NIMH...make it beautiful". In a 1985 interview, he described his role in the production as "first in the area of story, inventing incidents for the script, and now consists of looking, every three weeks to a month, at the storyboards that Bluth sends me and making my comments". Bluth later commented that "Steven has not dominated the creative growth of Tail at all. There is an equal share of both of us in the picture". Nevertheless, this was Spielberg's first animated feature, and it took some time for him to learn that adding a two-minute scene would take dozens of people months of work. In 1985, he stated: "At this point, I'm enlightened, but I still can't believe it's so complicated". It was Universal's third animated film, and also the first animated feature film since Pinocchio in Outer Space in 1965 and the first animated film that they co-produced.

=== Writing ===
Originally, the concept consisted of an all-animal world, like Disney's Robin Hood, but Bluth suggested featuring an animal world existing as a hidden society from the human world, like his own NIMH and Disney's The Rescuers. After viewing The Rescuers, Spielberg agreed. Emmy Award-winning writers Judy Freudberg and Tony Geiss (known for their work on Sesame Street) were brought in to expand the script. When the initial script was complete, it was extremely long and was heavily edited before its final release. Bluth felt uncomfortable with the main character's name, thinking "Fievel" was too foreign-sounding, and he felt audiences wouldn't remember it. Spielberg disagreed. The character was named after his maternal grandfather, Philip Posner, whose Yiddish name was Fievel. The scene in which he presses up against a window to look into a classroom filled with American "school mice" is based on a story Spielberg remembered about his grandfather, who told him that Jews were only able to listen to lessons through open windows while sitting outside in the snow. Spielberg eventually won out, though something of a compromise was reached by having Tony refer to Fievel as "Filly". Spielberg also had some material cut that he felt was too intense for children, including a scene Bluth was developing revolving around wave monsters while the family was at sea.

=== Casting ===
Bluth described the process of voice casting as "sometimes you can select a 'name' voice [i.e., a well-known actor] because it fits the essence of the character so well. Other times, you need to seek an obscure voice, close your eyes, and just listen to it. If it has the highs and lows in the deliverance of lines and it captures the focus of the character, it allows the animators to get a true fix on the action":

- Glasser (Fievel) was discovered by accident when Bluth and his crew overheard him auditioning for an Oscar Mayer commercial.
- Green (Tanya Mousekewitz) was a young actress who had done some previous television series work and several commercials.
- Persoff, a respected actor in many films, was chosen to play the part of Papa Mousekewitz mostly because he had a similar role as Barbra Streisand's father in Yentl.
- Yohn (Mama Mousekewitz) has appeared in many features, but her work as a Russian Rom on a TV show attracted the attention of Bluth and John Pomeroy.
- Finnegan won the role of Warren T. Rat by reciting excerpts of Shakespeare's Hamlet in the voice of a Brooklyn taxi driver. This idea inspired the writers to make Warren a pretentious illiterate who continually misquoted Shakespeare.
- Musick (Tony Toponi) based Tony's voice on a friend she knew from grade school.
- DeLuise (Tiger) had worked previously with Bluth in The Secret of NIMH, and DeLuise even added material to the script at various points. During the song "A Duo", he suggested they stop the music where the lyrics mention "back scratch" and have Fievel actually scratch Tiger's back.
- Henri was originally to be voiced by comedian Sid Caesar, and was conceived as scraggly and worn, but later Plummer was cast for the part and Henri was drawn with a more dignified look. Bluth felt Henri was an essential character to act as a voice for the statue "welcoming" Fievel to the new world.
- Kahn was chosen to play the part of Gussie Mausheimer with the hopes that she would use a voice similar to the one she used as a character in Mel Brooks' Blazing Saddles, with the character being written as German American for such.

Will Ryan (Digit), Neil Ross (Honest John), Cathianne Blore (Bridget), and Hal Smith (Moe) are all voice actors well known in the animation industry.

=== Design ===
In designing the look of the film and its characters, Bluth worked with Amblin Entertainment and the Sears marketing department (Sears had a major marketing push on the main character). He decided to make a stylistic shift from the more angular "modern style" of animation of the time to a style similar to Disney animation from the 1940s, where the characters have a softer and cuddlier feel. This proved successful, and at release many critics praised the "old fashioned style" of the film's look and feel. This was during a period when the market for nostalgia was particularly strong among baby boomers, who at this time were seeking products for their young children, and only three years before the beginning of the Disney Renaissance for the studio Bluth once worked for.

=== Animation ===
Bluth preferred to storyboard an entire picture, but it soon proved to be an enormous task. Larry Leker was brought in to assist, turning Bluth's rough sketches into final storyboard panels. Bluth commented that he would then "send them over to [Spielberg]. Often I brought them over myself, so that I could explain them. Steven would get very excited by what he saw, and we'd edit the boards right there...adding more drawings, or trimming some back". A large crew of animators was pulled together from around the world, using cel painters in Ireland. Discussion arose about moving the entire production to Ireland, but Spielberg balked at the idea of a story called An American Tail being produced overseas.

At this time, Bluth and his crew discovered that using a video printer greatly increased their productivity. They could videotape an action, then print out small black and white thermal images from the tape for reference for both human and animal characters, a shorthand method similar to the rotoscoping technique (called in fact xerography) used since the earliest days of animation, in which sequences are shot in live action and traced onto animation cels. They also utilized the process of building models and photographing them, particularly the ship at sea, and the "Giant Mouse of Minsk", a technique also used in many Disney films.

=== Production difficulties ===
During production, Amblin and Universal expected to view the dailies and approve all major work on the film, and various outside parties also requested changes here and there. The production buckled under the excessive oversight, and Bluth felt that he was losing freedom of control over the production process. As the release deadline approached, pressure grew among the crew and numerous problems arose, ranging from slower-than-expected cel painting in Ireland to low footage output by some animators. Also, the songwriters had written the score much later than originally desired. Suddenly scenes had to be dropped to save time and money and new, shorter scenes had to be created to help pick up the story points lost in the process, sometimes making the story line look jumbled. Notable cuts include the Mousekewitzes' journey across Europe, a scene in which they first meet Tiger, and he gets stuck up in a tree, an upbeat song that Fievel was planned to sing while imprisoned in the sweatshop, and a scene that gave greater explanation of the changing of names at Ellis Island. Cuts are also responsible for baby Yasha's apparent disappearance after the boat trip.

The film was also plagued by union difficulties. Bluth had agreed to accept $6.5 million to get it produced (which later grew to $9 million), at a time when Disney was spending around $12 million per film. He knew it would be difficult, but felt it was worth the sacrifice to work with Spielberg on a major project. With the agreement of his employees, salaries were frozen for a year and half. Unlike the former Bluth studios, the new Sullivan Bluth studios were non-union, and when many workers attempted to withdraw from the union, it sparked a battle between Bluth and the union that continued through most of the production. It was mostly this struggle that later compelled Bluth to relocate to Ireland, which he felt offered a more supportive atmosphere.

== Music ==
The soundtrack to An American Tail consisted of an original score composed by James Horner, which was performed by the London Symphony Orchestra and the Choir of King's College and four original songs composed by Cynthia Weil and Barry Mann in collaboration with Horner. The song "Somewhere Out There", performed by Linda Ronstadt and James Ingram, it later went on to win two Grammy Awards for Song of the Year and Best Song Written Specifically for a Motion Picture or for Television. It would become one of the most popular songs from an animated feature since the 1950s.

An official soundtrack containing 14 tracks from the film was first released on November 21, 1986, by MCA Records, and was made available on audio cassette, vinyl record, and CD. It was later released digitally by Geffen Records on February 5, 2013. Intrada Records released an expanded edition on February 12, 2019.

== Reception ==
=== Box office ===
The film has grossed up to $47 million in the United States and Canada, and $84 million worldwide. At the time of its domestic release, it became the highest-grossing animated feature for an initial release and the highest-grossing non-Disney produced animated feature. It was also one of the first animated films to outdraw a Disney one, beating out The Great Mouse Detective (another traditionally animated film involving mice that was released in 1986 but four months earlier) by over US$22 million, but The Great Mouse Detective was more successful with critics, most notably Gene Siskel and Roger Ebert. It would later be outgrossed by Bluth's next film, The Land Before Time, although Oliver & Company would make more at the box office.

=== Critical response ===
On the review aggregator website Rotten Tomatoes, 76% of 86 critics' reviews are positive, with an average rating of 6.4/10. The website's consensus reads: "Exquisitely animated, An American Tail is a sweet, melancholy, immigrants story." Metacritic, which uses a weighted average, assigned the film a score of 38 out of 100, based on 7 critics, indicating "generally unfavorable" reviews. Critics Gene Siskel and Roger Ebert gave it "two thumbs down" on a November 22, 1986, episode of their television program At the Movies, calling it "the most downbeat children's movie since Return to Oz", and that it was "way too depressing for young audiences". Both reviewers also criticized how it gave little mention that the main characters were Jewish, or that the attack on their home at the beginning was an antisemitic one. They called it "a Jewish parable that doesn't want to declare itself" and felt that it "chickened out on its ethnic heritage". In his own review for the Chicago Sun-Times, Roger Ebert gave it two stars out of four, giving credit to the animation, calling it "full and detailed, enhanced by computers and an improvement on so much recent animation that cuts corners", but that the story was too "dark and gloomy".

The film's writing garnered a mixed response. Halliwell's Film Guide claimed it didn't have "much in the way of narrative interest or indeed humor". Vincent Canby of The New York Times called it "witless if well-meaning", adding that its high points were scenes involving the characters Gussie Mausheimer and Tiger. In his review for the Chicago Reader, Pat Graham panned its "flimsy characterizations" but said that "the overall quality of the animation—baroquely executed if rather conventionally conceived—makes it worth a look". Common Sense Media gave it largely positive reviews, commenting that "this is a heartwarming animated tale about the experience of immigrants coming to America. Told from the perspective of an adorable young mouse, An American Tail should engage kids in an important part of U.S. history". Rita Kempley of The Washington Post called it "a bright-eyed tale of Jewish triumphs that will find a place in many young hearts", adding that "it reiterates the happiness of homogeneity, prepares the pups for both brotherhood and the free enterprise system. And it's as pretty as a cascade of soap bubbles".

Roger Harlburt, reviewing for the Sun-Sentinel, also praised the character of Fievel: "You'll discover in gentle Fievel an endearing character that manages to be lovable without undue sentiment. His eyes may tear up once in a while and his lower lip quiver, but mostly he's ready to face the situation. Still, the superb animation makes you believe Fievel is a small boy lost in a big world". Harlburt later summarized: "Laced with action scenes and peppered with amusing dialogue, the film moves along briskly. Little ones won't be bored. Original songs – including "Never Say Never", "Somewhere Out There" and "We're a Duo" – are also entertaining. You'll marvel over the quality of Plummer's singing voice and be convulsed by DeLuise's feline antics".

=== Accolades ===
Award	Category	Nominee(s)	Result	Ref.
Academy Awards	Best Original Song	"Somewhere Out There"; Music by James Horner and Barry Mann; Lyrics by Cynthia Weil	Nominated	
ASCAP Film and Television Music Awards	Most Performed Songs from a Motion Picture	"Somewhere Out There"; Music by James Horner and Barry Mann; Lyrics by Cynthia Weil	Won	
BMI Film & TV Awards	Most Performed Song from a Film	"Somewhere Out There"; Music by James Horner and Barry Mann; Lyrics by Cynthia Weil	Won	
Golden Globe Awards	Best Original Song	"Somewhere Out There"; Music by James Horner and Barry Mann; Lyrics by Cynthia Weil	Nominated	
Grammy Awards	Song of the Year	"Somewhere Out There"; James Horner, Barry Mann, and Cynthia Weil	Won	
Grammy Awards	Best Pop Performance by a Duo or Group with Vocals	"Somewhere Out There"; Linda Ronstadt and James Ingram	Nominated	
Grammy Awards	Best Album of Original Instrumental Background Score Written for a Motion Picture or Television	James Horner	Nominated	
Grammy Awards	Best Song Written Specifically for a Motion Picture or for Television	"Somewhere Out There"; James Horner, Barry Mann, and Cynthia Weil	Won	
Saturn Awards	Best Fantasy Film		Nominated	
Saturn Awards	Best Music	James Horner	Nominated	
Young Artist Awards	Best Family Motion Picture – Animation		Won	
Young Artist Awards	Best Animation Voice-Over Group	Phillip Glasser and Amy Green	Won	

American Film Institute recognition:

- 2004: AFI's 100 Years...100 Songs
  - "Somewhere Out There" – Nominated

== Home media ==
In September 1987, An American Tail was first released on VHS and became one of MCA Home Video's biggest sellers with sales of 1.4 million. It was later released on LaserDisc in both regular and CAV play editions in November 1991 by MCA Universal Home Video in North America, and CIC Video internationally. On August 11, 1998, both the film and its sequel An American Tail: Fievel Goes West were digitally restored and re-released onto VHS in a 2-pack box set with both videos having clamshell cases. A DVD version was first made available on January 20, 2004, by Universal Studios, which was presented in fullscreen aspect ratio only, and contained a number of changes from earlier versions, including re-dubbing certain character's voices in the Orphan Alley scene, the addition of new voices where there was previously no dialog, and new "humorous" sound effects. This version was reprinted along with other Universal films such as its sequel, The Land Before Time, and Balto. It was released in widescreen on Blu-ray for the first time on March 4, 2014, which included a digital HD and UltraViolet copy. It had the same changes as the DVD, although part of the film's end credits music score was 9% sped-up this time (due to time constrictions). A re-release of the fullscreen DVD version with new cover artwork followed on February 3, 2015. All four American Tail films were re-released on a combination pack DVD released on June 13, 2017. That release marked the first widescreen debut of the first two films on a Region 1 DVD.

== Sequels and legacy ==
The film gave rise to a number of follow-up media, in which Don Bluth had no direct involvement. The theatrical sequel Fievel Goes West, directed by Phil Nibbelink and Simon Wells and produced by Steven Spielberg and Robert Watts, was released in 1991 and follows the adventures of Fievel and his family as they move from New York to the Wild West. A 13-episode TV series based on it called Fievel's American Tails aired on the CBS network between September and December 1992. Two direct-to-video films were also later produced by Universal Pictures Home Entertainment: The Treasure of Manhattan Island in 1998, and The Mystery of the Night Monster in 1999. DeLuise was the only cast member to remain throughout the entire series as the voice of Tiger, while Glasser would be replaced by Thomas Dekker as the voice of Fievel in the direct-to-video sequels, and various other cast members were replaced throughout the franchise.

The Mousekewitz family would be parodied, somewhat, as a family of Italian American fleas in a few episodes of Tiny Toon Adventures, also produced by Steven Spielberg.

A video game based on this film was released for PlayStation 2 only in Europe in 2007 by Data Design Interactive.

Fievel would also serve as the mascot for Spielberg's Amblimation animation production company in London, England, appearing in its production logo until the studio's replacement by DreamWorks Animation in 1997. In March 2000, Fievel became the official children's spokesman for UNICEF, with the organization's director of communications Craig Kornblau remarking that "Fievel Mousekewitz is a popular endearing character for children everywhere" and "his immigration experiences reflect the adventures and triumphs of all cultures and their children".

Children's Theatre Company in Minneapolis has adapted the film into a stage musical, which made its world premiere on April 25, 2023. An American Tail the Musical features book and lyrics by playwright Itamar Moses, music and lyrics by Michael Mahler and Alan Schmuckler, and directed by Taibi Magar. The show is choreographed by Katie Spelman.

The Workers Circle staged a livestream table read of the script on September 10, 2026, to benefit its efforts towards advancing social justice in American society. The table read was hosted by Ken Jeong and Whoopi Goldberg, narrated by Jesse Eisenberg, and featured celebrities, including Bernadette Peters, Oscar Nuñez, and Mark Hamill.

== Alleged plagiarism ==
Art Spiegelman accused Spielberg of plagiarism because the Jews are depicted as mice in the film, just as in Spiegelman's earlier Maus, a metaphor he had adopted from Nazi propaganda. Instead of pursuing copyright litigation, he opted to beat its release date by convincing his publishers to split Maus into two volumes and publish the first before he even finished the second.

== Bibliography ==
- Cawley, John (1991). "An American Tail". The Animated Films of Don Bluth. Image Pub of New York. pp. 85–102. ISBN 0-685-50334-8.
