= List of compositions by James Horner =

This is a list of compositions by James Horner.

== Film ==
=== 1970s ===
Year	Title	Director	Studio(s)	Notes
1978	The Drought			(for the American Film Institute)
1978	Fantasies			(for the American Film Institute)
1978	Gist and Evans			(for the American Film Institute)
1978	Landscapes			(for the American Film Institute)
1978	Just for a Laugh			(for the American Film Institute)
1978	The Watcher			(for the American Film Institute)
1979	The Lady in Red	Lewis Teague	New World Pictures	
1979	Up from the Depths	Charles B. Griffith	New World Pictures	Additional cues only. Main score composed by Russell O’Malley.

=== 1980s ===
Year	Title	Director	Studio(s)	Notes
1980	Humanoids from the Deep	Barbara Peeters	New World Pictures	
1980	Battle Beyond the Stars	Jimmy T. Murakami	New World Pictures	Score reused in later Roger Corman productions
1981	The Hand	Oliver Stone	Orion Pictures; Warner Bros. Pictures	
1981	Wolfen	Michael Wadleigh	Orion Pictures; Warner Bros. Pictures	Replaced Craig Safan
1981	Deadly Blessing	Wes Craven	PolyGram Pictures; United Artists	
1981	The Pursuit of D. B. Cooper	Roger Spottiswoode	Universal Pictures	
1982	Star Trek II: The Wrath of Khan	Nicholas Meyer	Paramount Pictures	
1982	48 Hrs.	Walter Hill	Paramount Pictures	
1983	Space Raiders	Howard R. Cohen	New World Pictures	Score edited from Humanoids from the Deep and Battle Beyond the Stars
1983	Something Wicked This Way Comes	Jack Clayton	The Bryna Company; Walt Disney Pictures	Replaced Georges Delerue
1983	Krull	Peter Yates	Columbia Pictures	
1983	Brainstorm	Douglas Trumbull	Metro-Goldwyn-Mayer	
1983	Testament	Lynne Littman	Paramount Pictures	
1983	The Dresser	Peter Yates	Columbia Pictures	
1983	Gorky Park	Michael Apted	Orion Pictures (original theatrical release); Metro-Goldwyn-Mayer (current rights)	
1983	Uncommon Valor	Ted Kotcheff	Paramount Pictures	
1984	The Stone Boy	Christopher Cain	20th Century Fox	
1984	Star Trek III: The Search for Spock	Leonard Nimoy	Paramount Pictures	
1985	Heaven Help Us	Michael Dinner	HBO Pictures; TriStar Pictures	
1985	Cocoon	Ron Howard	20th Century Fox	
1985	Volunteers	Nicholas Meyer	TriStar Pictures	
1985	The Journey of Natty Gann	Jeremy Kagan	Walt Disney Pictures	Replaced Elmer Bernstein
1985	Commando	Mark L. Lester	Silver Pictures; 20th Century Fox	
1986	Off Beat	Michael Dinner	Silver Screens Partners II; Touchstone Pictures	
1986	Aliens	James Cameron	Brandywine Productions; 20th Century Fox	Oscar nomination
1986	Where the River Runs Black	Christopher Cain	Metro-Goldwyn-Mayer	
1986	The Name of the Rose	Jean-Jacques Annaud	RAI; Constantin Film; FR3; 20th Century Fox (North America); Columbia Pictures (International)	
1986	An American Tail	Don Bluth	Sullivan Bluth Studios; Amblin Entertainment; Universal Pictures	First score for an animated film; Grammy Winner, Oscar & Golden Globe nomination; also wrote "Somewhere Out There" with Barry Mann and Cynthia Weil for Linda Ronstadt and James Ingram
1987	P.K. and the Kid	Lou Lombardo	Sunn Classic Pictures	
1987	Project X	Jonathan Kaplan	20th Century Fox	
1987	*batteries not included	Matthew Robbins	Amblin Entertainment; Universal Pictures	
1988	Willow	Ron Howard	Lucasfilm; Imagine Entertainment; Metro-Goldwyn-Mayer	
1988	Red Heat	Walter Hill	Carolco Pictures; TriStar Pictures	
1988	Vibes	Ken Kwapis	Imagine Entertainment; Columbia Pictures	
1988	The Land Before Time	Don Bluth	Sullivan Bluth Studios; Amblin Entertainment; Universal Pictures	Also wrote "If We Hold On Together" with Will Jennings for Diana Ross
1988	Cocoon: The Return	Daniel Petrie	20th Century Fox	
1989	Field of Dreams	Phil Alden Robinson	Universal Pictures	Oscar nomination
1989	Honey, I Shrunk the Kids	Joe Johnston	Walt Disney Pictures	
1989	In Country	Norman Jewison	Warner Bros. Pictures	
1989	Dad	Gary David Goldberg	Amblin Entertainment; Universal Pictures	
1989	Glory	Edward Zwick	TriStar Pictures	Golden Globe nomination

=== 1990s ===
Year	Title	Director	Studio(s)	Notes
1990	I Love You to Death	Lawrence Kasdan	TriStar Pictures	
1990	Another 48 Hrs.	Walter Hill	Paramount Pictures	
1991	Once Around	Lasse Hallström	Cinecom Entertainment; Universal Pictures	
1991	My Heroes Have Always Been Cowboys	Stuart Rosenberg	The Samuel Goldwyn Company	
1991	Class Action	Michael Apted	Interscope Communications; 20th Century Fox	
1991	The Rocketeer	Joe Johnston	Gordon Company; Silver Screen Partners IV; Walt Disney Pictures	
1991	An American Tail: Fievel Goes West	Phil Nibbelink; Simon Wells	Amblimation; Amblin Entertainment; Universal Pictures	Golden Globe nomination; also wrote "Dreams to Dream" with Will Jennings for Linda Ronstadt
1992	Thunderheart	Michael Apted	TriBeCa Productions; TriStar Pictures	
1992	Sneakers	Phil Alden Robinson	Universal Studios	
1992	Unlawful Entry	Jonathan Kaplan	Largo Entertainment; 20th Century Fox	
1992	Patriot Games	Phillip Noyce	Paramount Pictures	
1993	Swing Kids	Thomas Carter	Hollywood Pictures	
1993	A Far Off Place	Mikael Salomon	Touchwood Pacific Partners; Amblin Entertainment; Walt Disney Pictures	
1993	Jack the Bear	Marshall Herskovitz	20th Century Fox	
1993	Once Upon a Forest	Charles Grosvenor	ITV; Hanna-Barbera Productions; 20th Century Fox	also wrote "Once Upon A Time With Me" with Will Jennings for Florence Warner
1993	House of Cards	Michael Lessac	Miramax Films	
1993	Hocus Pocus	Kenny Ortega	Walt Disney Pictures	Only wrote "Sarah's Theme" with Brock Walsh; film scored by John Debney
1993	Searching for Bobby Fischer	Steven Zaillian	Paramount Pictures	
1993	The Man Without a Face	Mel Gibson	Icon Productions; Warner Bros. Pictures	
1993	Bopha!	Morgan Freeman	Paramount Pictures	
1993	We're Back! A Dinosaur's Story	Dick Zondag; Ralph Zondag; Phil Nibbelink; Simon Wells	Amblimation; Amblin Entertainment; Universal Pictures	also wrote "Roll Back The Rock (To The Dawn Of Time)" with Thomas Dolby for Little Richard
1993	The Pelican Brief	Alan J. Pakula	Warner Bros. Pictures	
1994	Clear and Present Danger	Phillip Noyce	Paramount Pictures	
1994	The Pagemaster	Joe Johnston	Turner Feature Animation; 20th Century Fox (North America); Turner Pictures (International)	also wrote "Whatever You Imagine" with Barry Mann and Cynthia Weil for Wendy Moten
1994	Legends of the Fall	Edward Zwick	Bedford Falls Productions; TriStar Pictures	Golden Globe nomination; also wrote "Twilight and Mist" with Brock Walsh
1995	Braveheart	Mel Gibson	Icon Productions; The Ladd Company; Paramount Pictures (North America); 20th Century Fox (International)	Oscar, Golden Globe & BAFTA nomination
1995	Casper	Brad Silberling	Harvey Films; Amblin Entertainment; Universal Pictures	
1995	Apollo 13	Ron Howard	Imagine Entertainment; Universal Pictures	Oscar nomination
1995	Jade	William Friedkin	Paramount Pictures	
1995	Jumanji	Joe Johnston	Interscope Communications; TriStar Pictures	
1995	Balto	Simon Wells	Amblimation; Amblin Entertainment; Universal Pictures	also wrote "Reach for the Light" with Barry Mann and Cynthia Weil for Steve Winwood
1996	The Spitfire Grill	Lee David Zlotoff	Castle Rock Entertainment; Columbia Pictures	Replaced Bennie Wallace
1996	Courage Under Fire	Edward Zwick	Davis Entertainment; 20th Century Fox	
1996	To Gillian on Her 37th Birthday	Michael Pressman	Rastar; Triumph Films	
1996	Ransom	Ron Howard	Icon Productions; Imagine Entertainment; Touchstone Pictures	Replaced Howard Shore
1997	The Devil's Own	Alan J. Pakula	Columbia Pictures	
1997	Titanic	James Cameron	Lightstorm Entertainment; Paramount Pictures (North America); 20th Century Fox (International)	Oscar, Golden Globe & Grammy winner, BAFTA nomination; also wrote "My Heart Will Go On" with Will Jennings for Celine Dion
1998	Deep Impact	Mimi Leder	Paramount Pictures (US); DreamWorks Pictures (International)	
1998	The Mask of Zorro	Martin Campbell	Amblin Entertainment; TriStar Pictures	also wrote "I Want to Spend My Lifetime Loving You" with Will Jennings for Tina Arena and Marc Anthony
1998	Mighty Joe Young	Ron Underwood	RKO Pictures; Walt Disney Pictures	
1999	Bicentennial Man	Chris Columbus	1492 Pictures; Touchstone Pictures (North America); Columbia Pictures (International)	also wrote "Then You Look at Me" with Will Jennings for Celine Dion

=== 2000s ===
Year	Title	Director(s)	Studio(s)	Notes
2000	The Perfect Storm	Wolfgang Petersen	Warner Bros. Pictures	also wrote "Yours Forever" with Will Jennings for John Mellencamp
2000	How the Grinch Stole Christmas	Ron Howard	Imagine Entertainment; Universal Pictures	also wrote "Where Are You, Christmas?" with Mariah Carey and Will Jennings for Faith Hill; based on a book by Dr. Seuss.
2001	Enemy at the Gates	Jean-Jacques Annaud	Mandalay Pictures; Paramount Pictures	
2001	Iris	Richard Eyre	BBC Films; Intermedia; Mirage Enterprises; Miramax Films	
2001	A Beautiful Mind	Ron Howard	Imagine Entertainment; DreamWorks Pictures; Universal Pictures	Golden Globe & Oscar Nominee; also wrote "All Love Can Be" with Will Jennings for Charlotte Church
2002
2002	Windtalkers	John Woo	Lion Rock Productions; Metro-Goldwyn-Mayer; 01 Distribution (Italy)	
2002	The Four Feathers	Shekhar Kapur	Lakeshore Entertainment; Mandeville Films; Paramount Pictures (US); Miramax Films (International)	
2003	Beyond Borders	Martin Campbell	Mandalay Pictures; Paramount Pictures	
2003	Radio	Michael Tollin	Tollin/Robbins Productions; Revolution Studios; Columbia Pictures	
2003	The Missing	Ron Howard	Revolution Studios; Imagine Entertainment; Columbia Pictures	
2003	House of Sand and Fog	Vadim Perelman	DreamWorks Pictures	Oscar nominee
2004	Bobby Jones: Stroke of Genius	Rowdy Herrington	Film Foundry Releasing	
2004	Troy	Wolfgang Petersen	Warner Bros. Pictures	Replaced Gabriel Yared; also wrote "Remember" with Cynthia Weil for Josh Groban and Tanja Carovska
2004	The Forgotten	Joseph Ruben	Revolution Studios; Columbia Pictures	
2005	The Chumscrubber	Arie Posin	Newmarket Films; Equity Pictures; Go Fish Pictures (through DreamWorks Pictures)	
2005	Flightplan	Robert Schwentke	Imagine Entertainment; Touchstone Pictures	
2005	The Legend of Zorro	Martin Campbell	Spyglass Entertainment; Amblin Entertainment; Columbia Pictures	
2005	The New World	Terrence Malick	New Line Cinema	
2006	All the King's Men	Steven Zaillian	Relativity Media; Phoenix Pictures; Columbia Pictures	
2006	Apocalypto	Mel Gibson	Icon Productions; Touchstone Pictures	
2007	The Life Before Her Eyes	Vadim Perelman	2929 Entertainment; Magnolia Pictures	
2008	The Spiderwick Chronicles	Mark Waters	Nickelodeon Movies; The Kennedy/Marshall Company; Paramount Pictures	
2008	The Boy in the Striped Pyjamas	Mark Herman	BBC Films; Heyday Films; Miramax Films	
2009	Avatar	James Cameron	Lightstorm Entertainment; Dune Entertainment; Ingenious Film Partners; 20th Century Fox	Golden Globe, BAFTA & Oscar Nominee; also wrote "I See You" with Kuk Harrell and Simon Franglen for Leona Lewis

=== 2010s ===
Year	Title	Director(s)	Studio(s)	Notes
2010	The Karate Kid	Harald Zwart	Overbrook Entertainment; JW Productions; China Film Group; Columbia Pictures	Replaced Atli Örvarsson
2011	Day of the Falcon (also known as Black Gold)	Jean-Jacques Annaud	Image Entertainment	
2012	Cristiada	Dean Wright	ARC Entertainment; 20th Century Fox	
2012	The Amazing Spider-Man	Marc Webb	Marvel Entertainment; Columbia Pictures	
2015	Wolf Totem	Jean-Jacques Annaud		
2015	One Day in Auschwitz	Steve Purcell		Documentary
2015	Living in the Age of Airplanes	Brian J. Terwilliger	Terwilliger Productions	Documentary
2015	Southpaw	Antoine Fuqua	Escape Artists; Fuqua Films; The Weinstein Company	Posthumous release
2015	The 33	Patricia Riggen	Alcon Entertainment; Phoenix Pictures; Warner Bros. Pictures	Posthumous release
2016	The Magnificent Seven	Antoine Fuqua	Village Roadshow Pictures; Metro-Goldwyn-Mayer; Columbia Pictures	Posthumous release Composed with Simon Franglen; Main theme by Elmer Bernstein

== Television ==
- 1981 A Few Days in Weasel Creek
- 1981 Angel Dusted
- 1982 A Piano for Mrs. Cimino
- 1982 Rascals and Robbers: The Secret Adventures of Tom Sawyer and Huckleberry Finn
- 1983 Between Friends
- 1984 Shelley Duvall's Faerie Tale Theatre episode The Pied Piper of Hamelin
- 1985 Amazing Stories ("Alamo Jobe")
- 1985 Surviving
- 1990 Tales from the Crypt ("Cutting Cards")
- 1990 Extreme Close-Up
- 1992 Fish Police (theme and pilot episode)
- 1992 Crossroads (theme)
- 1999 Michelle Kwan Skates to Disney's Greatest Hits
- 2000 Freedom Song
- 2006 CBS Evening News

== Short films ==
- 1986 Captain EO
- 1989 Tummy Trouble
- 2012 First in Flight

== Other ==
- 2015 album Pas de Deux released in May 2015
- Pandora – The World of Avatar, theme park land and attractions; composed with Simon Franglen
- The score for the third THX promotional trailer, titled "Cimarron"
- The 1990-1997 Universal Pictures fanfare
- The 1996 Imagine Entertainment fanfare
- Horner's Spider-Man theme briefly appeared in the 2021 film Spider-Man: No Way Home
