= We're Back! A Dinosaur's Story =

We're Back! A Dinosaur's Story may refer to:

- We're Back! A Dinosaur's Story (book), a 1987 children's book drawn and written by Hudson Talbott
- We're Back! A Dinosaur's Story (film), a 1993 American animated film
