= James Horner =

American film composer (1953–2015)

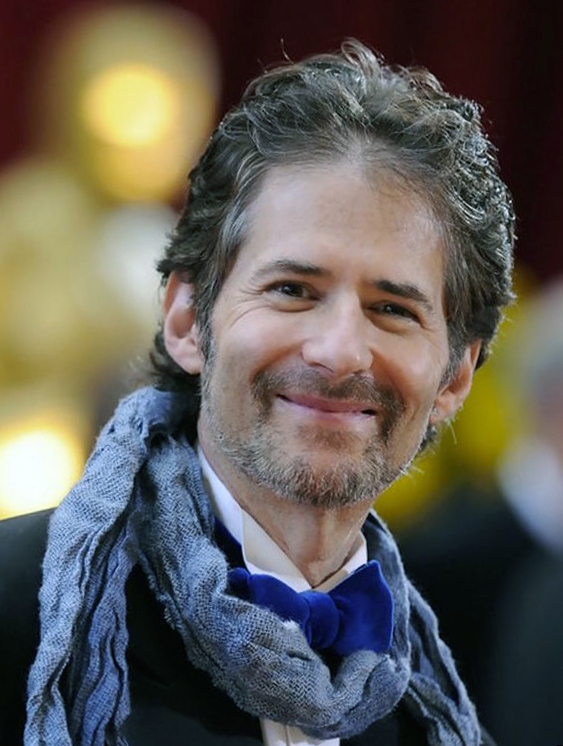
- Horner in 2010
- Born: August 14, 1953; Los Angeles, California, U.S.
- Died: June 22, 2015 (aged 61); Los Padres National Forest, near Ventucopa, California, U.S.
- Spouse: Sara Nelson
- Children: 2
- Father: Harry Horner
- Relatives: Susan B. Nelson (mother-in-law)
- Musical career
- Genre: Film score
- Occupations: Composer; conductor; orchestrator; music producer; songwriter
- Works: Full list
- Years active: 1978–2015

James Roy Horner (August 14, 1953 – June 22, 2015) was an American film composer and conductor. He is known for the integration of choral and electronic elements alongside traditional orchestrations, and for his use of motifs associated with Celtic music.

Horner worked on more than 160 films and television productions between 1978 and 2015. He won two Academy Awards for his musical composition to James Cameron's Titanic (1997), which became the best-selling orchestral film soundtrack of all time. He also wrote the score for the highest-grossing film of all time, Cameron's Avatar (2009). Horner's other Oscar-nominated scores were for Aliens (1986), An American Tail (1986), Field of Dreams (1989), Apollo 13 (1995), Braveheart (1995), A Beautiful Mind (2001), and House of Sand and Fog (2003). Horner's other notable scores include Star Trek II: The Wrath of Khan (1982), Willow (1988), The Land Before Time (1988), Glory (1989), The Rocketeer (1991), Legends of the Fall (1994), Jumanji (1995), Casper (1995), Balto (1995), The Mask of Zorro (1998), Deep Impact (1998), The Perfect Storm (2000), How the Grinch Stole Christmas (2000), Troy (2004), The New World (2005), The Legend of Zorro (2005), Apocalypto (2006), The Karate Kid (2010), and The Amazing Spider-Man (2012).

Horner collaborated on multiple projects with directors including James Cameron, Don Bluth, Ron Howard, Joe Johnston, Edward Zwick, Walter Hill, Mel Gibson, Vadim Perelman, Jean-Jacques Annaud, Nicholas Meyer, Wolfgang Petersen, Martin Campbell, Phil Nibbelink and Simon Wells; producers including Steven Spielberg, George Lucas, David Kirschner, Brian Grazer, Jon Landau, and Lawrence Gordon; and songwriters including Will Jennings, Barry Mann and Cynthia Weil. Adding to his two Academy Awards win, Horner also won six Grammy Awards, two Golden Globes, and was nominated for three BAFTA Awards.

An avid pilot, Horner died in a single-fatality crash in 2015 while flying his Short Tucano turboprop aircraft. He was 61 years old. The scores for his final three films, Southpaw (2015), The 33 (2015) and The Magnificent Seven (2016), were all completed and released posthumously.

== Early life and education ==
Horner was born on August 14, 1953, in Los Angeles, California, to Jewish immigrant parents. His father, Harry Horner, was a set designer and art director who emigrated from the Austro-Hungarian Empire. His mother, Joan Ruth (née Frankel), was born to a Canadian family. His brother Christopher is a writer and documentary filmmaker.

Horner started playing piano at the age of five. He also played violin. He spent his early years in London, where he attended the Royal College of Music, where he studied with György Ligeti. He returned to America, where he attended Verde Valley School in Sedona, Arizona, and later received his bachelor's degree in music from the University of Southern California. After earning a master's degree, he started work on his doctorate at the University of California, Los Angeles (UCLA), where he studied with Paul Chihara, among others. After several scoring assignments with the American Film Institute in the 1970s, he finished teaching a course in music theory at UCLA, then turned to film scoring.

== Career ==
Horner's first credits as a feature-film composer were for B-movie director and producer Roger Corman. 1979's The Lady in Red was followed by 1980's Humanoids from the Deep and Battle Beyond the Stars. As his work gained notice in Hollywood, Horner was invited to take on larger projects.

Horner's big break came in 1982 when he was asked to score Star Trek II: The Wrath of Khan. It established him as an A-list Hollywood composer. Director Nicholas Meyer quipped that Horner was hired because the studio could no longer afford the first Trek movie's composer, Jerry Goldsmith; but that by the time Meyer returned to the franchise with Star Trek VI: The Undiscovered Country, the studio could not afford Horner either.

Horner continued writing high-profile film scores in the 1980s, including 48 Hrs. (1982), Krull (1983), Star Trek III: The Search for Spock (1984), Commando (1985), Cocoon (1985), Aliens (1986), Captain EO (1986), *batteries not included (1987), Willow (1988), Glory and Field of Dreams (both 1989). Cocoon was the first of his many collaborations with director Ron Howard.

In 1987, Horner's original score for Aliens brought him his first Academy Award nomination. "Somewhere Out There," which he co-composed and co-wrote with Barry Mann and Cynthia Weil for An American Tail, was also nominated that year for Best Original Song.

Throughout the 1980s, 1990s and 2000s, Horner wrote orchestral scores for family films (particularly those produced by Steven Spielberg's Amblin Entertainment), with credits for An American Tail (1986); The Land Before Time (1988); The Rocketeer, Once Around and An American Tail: Fievel Goes West (1991); Sneakers (1992); Once Upon a Forest and We're Back! A Dinosaur's Story (1993); The Pagemaster (1994); Casper, Jumanji and Balto (1995); Mighty Joe Young (1998); and How the Grinch Stole Christmas (2000).

In 1990, Horner conducted a new fanfare for Universal Pictures which was first used in Back to the Future Part III.

Horner scored six films in 1995, including his commercially successful and critically acclaimed works for Braveheart and Apollo 13, both of which received Academy Award nominations.

Horner's biggest critical and financial success came in 1997 with his score for James Cameron's Titanic. At the 70th Academy Awards, Horner received the Oscar for Best Original Dramatic Score, and shared the Oscar for Best Original Song with co-writer Will Jennings for "My Heart Will Go On". The film's score and song also won three Grammy Awards and two Golden Globe Awards. (Ten years earlier, Horner had vowed never to work with Cameron again, referring to the highly stressful scoring sessions for Aliens as "a nightmare.")

After Titanic, Horner continued to compose for major productions, including The Perfect Storm, A Beautiful Mind, Enemy at the Gates, The Mask of Zorro, The Legend of Zorro, House of Sand and Fog and Bicentennial Man. He also worked on smaller projects such as Iris, Radio and Bobby Jones: Stroke of Genius. He received his eighth and ninth Academy Award nominations for A Beautiful Mind (2001) and House of Sand and Fog (2003), but lost on both occasions to composer Howard Shore.

Horner composed the 2006–2011 theme for the CBS Evening News, which was introduced during the debut of anchor Katie Couric on September 5, 2006. He wrote various treatments of the theme, explaining, "One night the show might begin with the Iranians obtaining a nuclear device, and another it might be something about a flower show... The tone needs to match the news."

Horner collaborated again with James Cameron on his 2009 film Avatar, which became the highest-grossing film of all time, surpassing Cameron's own Titanic. Horner worked exclusively on Avatar for over two years. He said, "Avatar has been the most difficult film I have worked on, and the biggest job I have undertaken... I work from four in the morning to about ten at night, and that's been my way of life since March. That's the world I'm in now, and it makes you feel estranged from everything. I'll have to recover from that and get my head out of [it]."

Avatar brought Horner his tenth Academy Award nomination, as well as nominations for the Golden Globe Award, British Academy Film Award and Grammy Award, all of which he lost to Michael Giacchino for Up.

After Avatar, Horner wrote the score for the 2010 version of The Karate Kid, replacing Atli Örvarsson. In 2011, he scored Cristiada (also known as For Greater Glory), which was released a year later; and Black Gold. In 2012 he scored The Amazing Spider-Man. In an interview on his website, Horner revealed that he did not return to compose the score for the sequel because he did not like how the movie resulted in comparison to the first movie, calling it "dreadful." He was replaced by Hans Zimmer. James Horner's theme for The Amazing Spider-Man would later be incorporated into the film Spider-Man: No Way Home, composed by Michael Giacchino.

In early 2015, after a three-year hiatus, Horner wrote the music for the adventure film Wolf Totem, his fourth collaboration with director Jean-Jacques Annaud.

At the time of his death, Horner had scored two films yet to be released: Southpaw, a boxing drama directed by Antoine Fuqua (Horner wrote the score for free, due to his love for the film) and The 33, for director Patricia Riggen.

In July 2015, a month after his death, it was discovered Horner had also written the score for the 2016 remake of The Magnificent Seven, planning it as a surprise.

Horner's scores are also heard in trailers for other films. The climax of Bishop's Countdown, from his score for Aliens, ranks as the fifth most commonly used soundtrack cue in trailers.

Horner also wrote the theme music for the Horsemen P-51 Aerobatic Team, and appears in The Horsemen Cometh, a documentary about the team and the P-51 Mustang fighter plane. The theme is heard at the team's airshow performances.

=== Orchestral work ===
Pas de Deux, a double concerto for violin, cello and orchestra with the Royal Liverpool Philharmonic Orchestra, was premiered on November 12, 2014, by Mari and Håkon Samuelsen, with the orchestra conducted by Vasily Petrenko. Horner also composed Collage, a concerto for four horns, premiered on March 27, 2015, at London's Royal Festival Hall by the London Philharmonic Orchestra conducted by Jaime Martín, with soloists David Pyatt, John Ryan, James Thatcher and Richard Watkins. Two early works, Spectral Shimmers (1978) and A Forest Passage (2000), are to be performed and recorded for the first time in 2021.

== Musical "borrowing" ==
Horner was criticized on many occasions for reusing passages from his earlier compositions and for featuring brief excerpts and reworked themes from classical composers. For example, his scores from Star Trek II: The Wrath of Khan and Star Trek III: The Search for Spock include excerpts from Prokofiev's Alexander Nevsky and Romeo and Juliet, respectively. Much of his score from Star Trek II: The Wrath of Khan was reworked yet again for his musical score for 1983’s Krull. The action ostinato from Aliens is originally from Wolfen. The film's main title is almost identical to Aram Khachaturian's Gayane Ballet Suite (Adagio), already used in an outer-space context in 2001: A Space Odyssey, and was used again within the score of Patriot Games and Clear and Present Danger.

The heroic theme from Willow is based on that of Robert Schumann's Rhenish Symphony. Field of Dreams includes cues from the "Saturday Night Waltz" portion of Aaron Copland's ballet Rodeo and Copland's score from Our Town. Horner blended part of an early theme from the third movement of Shostakovich's Symphony no. 5 into an action scene in Patriot Games. Musical motifs from 48 Hrs. are recycled into Commando, Red Heat, and Another 48 Hrs.. The climactic battle scene in Glory includes excerpts from Wagner and Orff.

Some critics felt these propensities made Horner's compositions inauthentic or unoriginal. In a 1997 issue of Film Score Monthly, an editorial review of Titanic said Horner was "skilled in the adaptation of existing music into films with just enough variation to avoid legal troubles".

Several critics have noted stark similarities between Braveheart's "Main Theme" and an earlier theme song, Kaoru Wada's "Pai Longing" from the 1991 Japanese anime series 3×3 Eyes.

On at least one occasion, Horner's musical "borrowing" almost led to litigation. Horner's main title for Honey, I Shrunk the Kids (1989) incorporates cues from the score by Nino Rota from Federico Fellini's film Amarcord (1973) and Raymond Scott's piece "Powerhouse B" (1937), the latter often referenced in Carl Stalling's Warner Bros. cartoon scores. Scott's piece was used without payment or credit, leading his estate to threaten legal action against Disney. Disney paid an undisclosed sum in an out-of-court settlement and changed the film's cue sheets to credit Scott.

== Personal life ==
Horner was a qualified private pilot and owned several small airplanes. His studio was filled with small automatons and objects which he purchased and collected over time. After his death, Horner's widow and daughter disclosed that he had been diagnosed with Asperger syndrome.

== Death ==
Horner was killed on June 22, 2015, when his turboprop aircraft, a Short Tucano with registration number N206PZ, crashed into the Los Padres National Forest near Ventucopa, California. Horner was the only occupant of the aircraft when it took off after fueling at Camarillo Airport. Three days later, on June 25, the Ventura County Medical Examiner's Office ruled the crash an accident.

Post-accident investigation by the National Transportation Safety Board (NTSB) revealed that the leading cause of the accident was Horner's inability to maintain clearance from terrain during low-level flight. During the flight, Horner contacted the Southern California Air Route Traffic Control Center, from which he received advisories while flying over the Chumash Wilderness area. The NTSB interviewed two witnesses of the flight, who were in their homes when Horner flew over them; one said that the plane was flying at between 500 and 750 feet (150 and 230 m). FAA radar data showed that the plane had made multiple low-altitude turns and performed rapid altitude change maneuvers, flying low through Quatal Canyon and skimming mountain ridgelines by less than 100 feet (30 m).

In addition to Horner's failing to maintain clearance, the NTSB determined there were other key factors that led to the accident. Foremost among these was Horner's use of prescription medications for pain relief and headaches. Toxicology testing found butalbital, codeine and ethanol in his body—although the ethanol may have been due to ingestion or produced by microbial activity after his death.

=== Tributes ===
Contemporaries and collaborators around the world paid their respects to Horner, including composers Hans Zimmer, John Williams, Paul Williams and Alan Menken, and directors Ron Howard and James Cameron. Horner was reported to have been committed to the Avatar franchise; Cameron said "There's so much music he could have done. We were looking forward to our next gig." Horner's assistant, Sylvia Patrycja, wrote on her Facebook page, "We have lost an amazing person with a huge heart and unbelievable talent [who] died doing what he loved."

Many celebrities, including Russell Crowe, Diane Warren and Celine Dion, also gave their condolences. Dion, who sang "My Heart Will Go On", one of Horner's most popular compositions, which is considered Dion's signature song, wrote on her website that she and husband René Angélil were "shaken by the tragic death" of their friend and "will always remember his kindness and great talent that changed [her] career".

Leona Lewis, who recorded Horner's "I See You" for Avatar, said working with him "was one of the biggest moments of my life." The final films for which he composed the score, Southpaw, The 33 and The Magnificent Seven, were all dedicated to his memory, as was the film Hacksaw Ridge. Avatar: The Way of Water, which Horner was set to work on before he died, was also dedicated to his memory (as well as actor Bill Paxton, who died in 2017 and appeared in films Aliens, Apollo 13, and Titanic scored by the composer).

== Legacy ==
Horner's extensive papers and archives are preserved and available for researchers at the UCLA Charles E. Young Research Library Special Collections and Archives. The film, The World of James Horner – Hollywood in Vienna (2013), directed by Sandra Tomek was dedicated to Horner.

== Awards and nominations ==
Horner won two Academy Awards, for Best Original Dramatic Score (Titanic) and Best Original Song ("My Heart Will Go On") in 1998, and was nominated for an additional eight Oscars. He also won two Golden Globe Awards, three Satellite Awards, three Saturn Awards, six Grammys, and was nominated for three British Academy Film Awards.

In October 2013, Horner received the Max Steiner Award at the Hollywood in Vienna Gala, an award given for extraordinary achievement in the field of film music.

=== AFI ===
In 2005, the American Film Institute unveiled their list of the top twenty-five American film scores. Five of Horner's scores were among 250 nominees, making him the most nominated composer to not make the top twenty-five.

- Field of Dreams (1989)
- Glory (1989)
- Apollo 13 (1995)
- Braveheart (1995)
- Titanic (1997)

=== List of accolades ===
Award	Year	Category	Project	Outcome
Academy Awards	1987	Best Original Score	Aliens	Nominated
Academy Awards	1987	Best Original Song	"Somewhere Out There" (from An American Tail; shared with Cynthia Weil and Barry Mann)	Nominated
Academy Awards	1990	Best Original Score	Field of Dreams	Nominated
Academy Awards	1996	Best Original Dramatic Score	Apollo 13	Nominated
Academy Awards	1996	Best Original Dramatic Score	Braveheart	Nominated
Academy Awards	1998	Best Original Dramatic Score	Titanic	Won
Academy Awards	1998	Best Original Song	"My Heart Will Go On" (from Titanic; shared with Will Jennings)	Won
Academy Awards	2002	Best Original Score	A Beautiful Mind	Nominated
Academy Awards	2004	Best Original Score	House of Sand and Fog	Nominated
Academy Awards	2010	Best Original Score	Avatar	Nominated
BAFTA Awards	1996	Best Film Music	Braveheart	Nominated
BAFTA Awards	1998	Best Film Music	Titanic	Nominated
BAFTA Awards	2010	Best Film Music	Avatar	Nominated
Chicago Film Critics Association	1995	Best Original Score	Apollo 13	Nominated
Chicago Film Critics Association	1997	Best Original Score	Titanic	Won
Chicago Film Critics Association	2001	Best Original Score	A Beautiful Mind	Nominated
Chicago Film Critics Association	2009	Best Original Score	Avatar	Nominated
Golden Globe Awards	1987	Best Original Song	"Somewhere Out There" (from An American Tail; shared with Cynthia Weil and Barry Mann)	Nominated
Golden Globe Awards	1990	Best Original Score	Glory	Nominated
Golden Globe Awards	1992	Best Original Song	"Dreams to Dream" (from An American Tail: Fievel Goes West; shared with Will Jennings)	Nominated
Golden Globe Awards	1995	Best Original Score	Legends of the Fall	Nominated
Golden Globe Awards	1996	Best Original Score	Braveheart	Nominated
Golden Globe Awards	1998	Best Original Score	Titanic	Won
Golden Globe Awards	1998	Best Original Song	"My Heart Will Go On" (from Titanic; shared with Will Jennings)	Won
Golden Globe Awards	2002	Best Original Score	A Beautiful Mind	Nominated
Golden Globe Awards	2010	Best Original Score	Avatar	Nominated
Golden Globe Awards	2010	Best Original Song	"I See You" (from Avatar; shared with Kuk Harrell and Simon Franglen)	Nominated
Grammy Awards	1987	Best Instrumental Composition	Aliens	Nominated
Grammy Awards	1988	Song of the Year	"Somewhere Out There" (from An American Tail; shared with Cynthia Weil and Barry Mann)	Won
Grammy Awards	1988	Best Song Written Specifically For A Motion Picture Or Television	"Somewhere Out There" (from An American Tail; shared with Cynthia Weil and Barry Mann)	Won
Grammy Awards	1988	Best Album Of Original Instrumental Background Score Written For A Motion Picture Or Television	An American Tail	Nominated
Grammy Awards	1990	Best Instrumental Composition	Field of Dreams	Nominated
Grammy Awards	1990	Best Album Of Original Instrumental Background Score Written For A Motion Picture Or Television	Field of Dreams	Nominated
Grammy Awards	1991	Best Instrumental Composition Written For A Motion Picture Or For Television	Glory	Won
Grammy Awards	1996	Best Song Written Specifically For A Motion Picture Or Television	"Whatever You Imagine" (from The Pagemaster; shared with Cynthia Weil and Barry Mann)	Nominated
Grammy Awards	1999	Record of the Year	"My Heart Will Go On" (from Titanic; shared with Will Jennings)	Won
Grammy Awards	1999	Song of the Year	"My Heart Will Go On" (from Titanic; shared with Will Jennings)	Won
Grammy Awards	1999	Best Song Written For A Motion Picture Or For Television	"My Heart Will Go On" (from Titanic; shared with Will Jennings)	Won
Grammy Awards	2003	Best Score Soundtrack Album For A Motion Picture, Television Or Other Visual Media	A Beautiful Mind	Nominated
Grammy Awards	2011	Best Song Written for a Motion Picture, Television or Other Visual Media	"I See You" (from Avatar; shared with Kuk Harrell and Simon Franglen)	Nominated
Grammy Awards	2011	Best Score Soundtrack Album For A Motion Picture, Television Or Other Visual Media	Avatar	Nominated
Satellite Awards	1997	Best Original Score	Titanic	Won
Satellite Awards	1997	Best Original Song	"My Heart Will Go On" (from Titanic; shared with Will Jennings)	Won
Satellite Awards	2001	Best Original Score	A Beautiful Mind	Nominated
Satellite Awards	2001	Best Original Song	"All Love Can Be" (from A Beautiful Mind; shared with Will Jennings)	Won
Satellite Awards	2003	Best Original Score	The Missing	Nominated
Saturn Awards	1983	Best Music	Brainstorm	Won
Saturn Awards	1983	Best Music	Krull	Nominated
Saturn Awards	1983	Best Music	Something Wicked This Way Comes	Nominated
Saturn Awards	1985	Best Music	Cocoon	Nominated
Saturn Awards	1986	Best Music	An American Tail	Nominated
Saturn Awards	1989	Best Music	Honey, I Shrunk the Kids	Nominated
Saturn Awards	1995	Best Music	Braveheart	Nominated
Saturn Awards	2000	Best Music	How the Grinch Stole Christmas	Won
Saturn Awards	2009	Best Music	Avatar	Won
