= Zondag =

Zondag may refer to:

- "Zondag", song by Dutch singer Rob de Nijs
- Ralph Zondag, Canadian animator
