= Donald Corren =

American actor

- Born: Donald T. Corren; Stockton, California, U.S.
- Other name: Sam Gold
- Occupations: Actor, screenwriter
- Years active: 1989–present
- Website: http://www.donaldcorren.com

Donald T. Corren is an American Broadway and film actor and screenwriter. He created the role of Cosmé McMoon opposite Judy Kaye's Florence Foster Jenkins in the 2005 Broadway production of Souvenir. He also starred on Broadway in Torch Song Trilogy, for which he received awards from both the Los Angeles and San Francisco Drama Critics Circle while on tour. He appeared Off Broadway in The Last Sunday in June, Saturday Night, and Tom Foolery. He played the recurring part of Medill for nine seasons on NBC's Law & Order and has also appeared on Rescue Me, Law & Order: Criminal Intent, and Law & Order: Trial by Jury. Corren has also written for TV and corporate clients, including Martha Stewart's early weekly television shows and the 2002 Winter Olympics in Salt Lake City, Utah. Corren received his education at Juilliard.

== Filmography ==
| Year | Film | Role | Notes |
|---|---|---|---|
| 1989 | The Days and Nights of Molly Dodd | Waiter #1 | television movie |
| 1991 | Law & Order | Carl Dibbs | episode: Renunciation |
| 1991 | Law & Order | Ezra Stine | episode: Heaven |
| 1992–99 | Law & Order | Medill | 17 episodes |
| 2004 | Law & Order: Criminal Intent | Dr. Nouriyani | episode: Semi-Detached |
| 2004 | Rescue Me | Kevin | episode: Kansas |
| 2005 | Law & Order: Trial by Jury | Martin Addas | episode: Blue Wall |
| 2006 | Romeo & Juliet: Sealed with a Kiss | Benvolio (voice) | Credited as Sam Gold |
| 2008–09 | The Mr. Men Show | Mr. Happy, Mr. Bounce and Mr. Grumpy (voice, American version) | Credited as Sam Gold; 53 episodes |
| 2008 | The Torch | writer | documentary |
| 2012 | 666 Park Avenue | Hans | episode: Downward Spiral |
| 2014–15 | Z Nation | Dr. Kurian | 6 episodes |
| 2015 | Specials | Mr. Green | Short film |
| 2017 | Broadway: The Next Generation | himself | documentary |
| 2020 | Christmas on the Square | Dr. Marshall | |
