= Amblimation =

British animation production subsidiary of Amblin Entertainment

- Type: Subsidiary
- Industry: Animation
- Predecessor: Sullivan Bluth Studios (through distribution of An American Tail: Fievel Goes West by Universal Pictures)
- Founded: May 1989; 37 years ago
- Founder: Steven Spielberg
- Defunct: 1995; 31 years ago
- Fate: Closed
- Successor: Studio: DreamWorks Animation; Library: Universal Animation Studios (through distribution of the An American Tail and Balto sequels, both by Universal Pictures)
- Headquarters: Park House, 207–211 The Vale, Acton, London, England, United Kingdom
- Key people: Kate Mallory (studio manager); Simon Wells (director); Cynthia Woodbyrne (production manager)
- Products: Animated films
- Parent: Amblin Entertainment

Amblimation was a British animation production company that served as the animation subsidiary of Amblin Entertainment. It was formed by Steven Spielberg in May 1989, following the success of Who Framed Roger Rabbit (1988), and after he parted ways with Don Bluth due to creative differences. It only produced three feature films: An American Tail: Fievel Goes West (1991), We're Back! A Dinosaur's Story (1993), and Balto (1995), all three of which feature music composed by James Horner and were distributed by Universal Pictures. The company's mascot, Fievel Mousekewitz, appears in its production logo. It was based in the former Eaton Yale and Towne UK factory in Acton, London, and had 250 crew members from 15 different nations.

The studio closed in 1997 after only eight years of operation after the box office failures of We're Back! A Dinosaur's Story and Balto. All 250 of Amblimation's crew members went on to join DreamWorks Animation, which was later acquired in 2016 by Universal's parent companies Comcast and NBCUniversal for $3.8 billion.

== History ==
Film director and producer Steven Spielberg first began working in animation when he served as executive producer on An American Tail and The Land Before Time, both directed by Don Bluth, as well as Robert Zemeckis's Who Framed Roger Rabbit. Following the successes of all three films, Spielberg planned to collaborate with Bluth again to produce a sequel to An American Tail; however, owing to creative differences, both men parted ways. In light of Bluth's departure, Spielberg chose former Disney animator Phil Nibbelink and former Richard Williams storyboard artist Simon Wells, the great-grandson of science-fiction author H. G. Wells, both of whom had previously worked with him as supervising animators on Who Framed Roger Rabbit, to direct the sequel, Fievel Goes West. In order to produce the film, Spielberg formed Amblimation, a collaboration between Universal Pictures and Amblin Entertainment, which was based out of the former Eaton Yale and Towne factory in Acton, London, and had an international crew of 250 members from 15 different nations. Fievel Goes West was officially put into production when the studio first opened in May 1989, and at the time, the studio was also developing We're Back! A Dinosaur's Story, an animated adaptation of Andrew Lloyd Webber's Cats and an animated adaptation of William Steig's book Shrek!

As production on Fievel Goes West was wrapping up, Nibbelink and Wells began storyboarding on We're Back!. Once the animatic for We're Back! was completed in 1991, Spielberg brought in brothers Dick and Ralph Zondag to continue directing it, and assigned Nibbelink and Wells to direct Cats, which was intended to be Amblimation's third film after We're Back!. However, production on Cats was delayed continuously, due to Webber's dissatisfaction with the story direction. Eventually, Cats was scrapped, and Nibbelink and Wells returned to finish We're Back!. However, shortly afterwards, Wells left the project again to direct Balto, leaving Nibbelink to finish We're Back! alone. Ultimately, We're Back! was a box-office bomb, grossing just over $9 million and failing to reach the massive success of Jurassic Park, which Spielberg had released the previous summer.

The commercial failure of We're Back! led to budgetary constraints on Balto, and would lead to it being Amblimation's final film. In October 1994, Spielberg co-founded DreamWorks Pictures with former Disney chairman Jeffrey Katzenberg and music executive David Geffen, and relocated 120 of Amblimation's crew members to Los Angeles as Balto neared completion, to form DreamWorks Animation. In early June 1995, Edgar Bronfman, Jr., then-head of Universal's parent company at the time, Seagram, agreed to discontinue Amblimation as part of a distribution deal with Geffen, despite the objections of his colleague, Michael Ovitz. After Balto failed at the box office, Amblimation was officially closed, and most of the remaining crew members joined DreamWorks to begin working on The Prince of Egypt, while some moved on to join other studios. DreamWorks would also pick up one of Amblimation's in-development projects, being the adaptation of Shrek! where it would become the 2001 animated film, Shrek.

== Filmography ==
=== Theatrical feature films ===
Title	Release date	Director(s)	Story by	Screenplay by	Producer(s)	Budget	Box office gross
An American Tail: Fievel Goes West	22 November 1991	Phil Nibbelink; Simon Wells	Based on the characters by: David Kirschner; Judy Freudberg; Tony Geiss	Flint Dille	Steven Spielberg; Robert Watts	$16.5 million	$40,766,041
An American Tail: Fievel Goes West	22 November 1991	Phil Nibbelink; Simon Wells	Charles Swenson	Flint Dille	Steven Spielberg; Robert Watts	$16.5 million	$40,766,041
We're Back! A Dinosaur's Story	24 November 1993	Phil Nibbelink; Simon Wells; Ralph Zondag; Dick Zondag	Based on the book by: Hudson Talbott	John Patrick Shanley	Steve Hickner	$20 million	$9,317,021 (US)
Balto	22 December 1995	Simon Wells	Based on: The true story of Balto	Cliff Ruby; Elana Lesser; David Steven Cohen; Roger S.H. Schulman	Steve Hickner	$31 million	$11,348,324
Balto	22 December 1995	Simon Wells	Cliff Ruby; Elana Lesser	Cliff Ruby; Elana Lesser; David Steven Cohen; Roger S.H. Schulman	Steve Hickner	$31 million	$11,348,324

== See also ==
- Illumination
- Amblin Entertainment
- DreamWorks Animation
- Universal Interactive
- Universal Animation Studios
- Sullivan Bluth Studios
- List of Universal Pictures theatrical animated feature films
- List of unproduced Universal Pictures animated projects
