= Phil Nibbelink =

American animator and film director

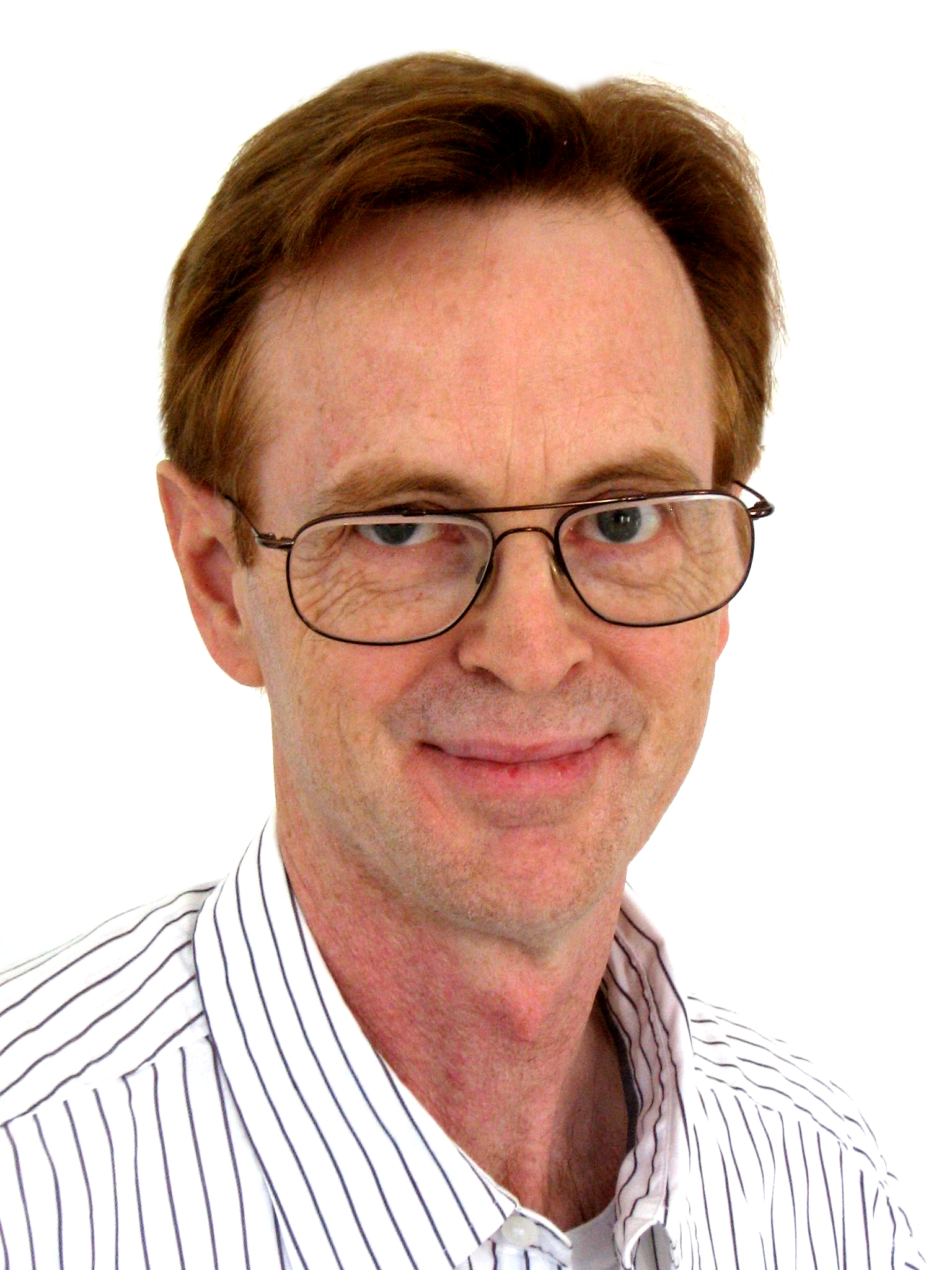

Phil Nibbelink is an American animator and film director as well as comic book writer and illustrator known for his work on films as the Academy Award-winning Who Framed Roger Rabbit and the 1991 cult animated sequel An American Tail: Fievel Goes West.

== Career ==
Nibbelink worked for ten years at Disney and was a directing animator on Who Framed Roger Rabbit. Then he spent ten years working under Steven Spielberg as an animation director, working on films such as An American Tail: Fievel Goes West (which he co-directed with Simon Wells) and Casper as animation director. He also directed an animated adaptation of the children's book We're Back! A Dinosaur's Story for Amblimation. He was originally scheduled to co-direct Balto with Wells, but production on We're Back! A Dinosaur's Story was incomplete, so Wells advised Nibbelink to continue working on We're Back! A Dinosaur's Story, while he set to work on Balto. Afterwards, Nibbelink began working with Dick and Ralph Zondag (with whom he and Wells had co-directed We're Back! A Dinosaur's Story) on the upcoming movie, Cats, until it was cancelled after Amblimation's founder and owner, Steven Spielberg, closed the studio in 1997 and co-founded DreamWorks Animation.

== Later works ==
Nibbelink later turned his attention to independent filmmaking, producing three full-length animated features single-handedly. These films included Puss in Boots (1999) and Romeo & Juliet: Sealed with a Kiss (2006). He is the founder and owner of his company, Phil Nibbelink Productions. Nibbelink was a storyboard artist on Wolverine and the X-Men.

== Filmography ==
- Banjo the Woodpile Cat (1979) (animator: dogs) (uncredited)
- The Fox and the Hound (1981) (character animator)
- The Black Cauldron (1985) (voice of Henchmen, character designer, character animator)
- The Great Mouse Detective (1986) (character animator)
- Who Framed Roger Rabbit (1988) (directing animator, supervising animator)
- Oliver & Company (1988) (storyboard artist - uncredited)
- An American Tail: Fievel Goes West (1991) (director)
- The Magic Voyage (1992) (animation director, key animator, storyboard artist)
- We're Back! A Dinosaur's Story (1993) (director)
- Casper (1995) (animation director)
- Boogie Woogie Whale Sing-Along (1997) (director, writer, animator)
- Puss in Boots (1999) (director, writer, editor, animator, background artist, songwriter)
- Leif Ericson: The Boy Who Discovered America (2000) (director, writer, editor, animator, background artist)
- Romeo & Juliet: Sealed with a Kiss (2006) (voice of Prince, director, producer, writer, editor, animator, background artist, songwriter)
- Wolverine and the X-Men (2008–2009) (storyboard artist)
- The Further Adventures of Thunderbolt (2015) (animator)
- Animal Crackers (2017) (storyboard artist)
- Michael Jackson's Halloween (2017) (storyboard artist)
- Marmaduke (2022) (co-director, animation director, storyboard artist, additional writing, songwriter)
- The Swan Princess: A Fairy Tale is Born (2023) (set designer)
- The Swan Princess: Far Longer Than Forever (2023) (storyboard artist, set designer)
