= Romeo & Juliet: Sealed with a Kiss =

2006 film by Phil Nibbelink

- Theatrical release poster
- Directed by: Phil Nibbelink
- Written by: Phil Nibbelink
- Based on: Romeo and Juliet by William Shakespeare
- Produced by: Phil Nibbelink; Margit Friesacher
- Starring: Daniel Trippett; Patricia Trippett; Chip Albers; Sam Gold; Michael Toland; Stephen Goldberg; Phil Nibbelink; Chanelle Nibbelink
- Narrated by: Michael Toland
- Edited by: Phil Nibbelink
- Music by: Christopher Page; Tommy Carter; Stephen Bashaw; Jack Waldenmaier; Steven Wenger; Bill Holloman; Curt Macdonald; Kirk Cirillo
- Animation by: Phil Nibbelink
- Layouts by: Phil Nibbelink
- Backgrounds by: Phil Nibbelink
- Production company: Phil Nibbelink Productions
- Distributed by: Indican Pictures
- Release date: October 27, 2006
- Running time: 76 minutes
- Country: United States
- Language: English
- Budget: $2 million
- Box office: $463,002

Romeo & Juliet: Sealed with a Kiss is a 2006 American animated musical romantic fantasy comedy-drama film loosely following the play Romeo and Juliet by William Shakespeare. The film is about two star-crossed sea lions, Romeo and Juliet (voiced by Daniel and Patricia Trippet respectively), who fall in love against the wishes of their warring families. It was released in Spain in mid-2006 and on October 27 in the United States.

The film was directed, written, and entirely animated by former Disney animator Phil Nibbelink. The film, created on an estimated budget of $2 million, took 4½ years to complete and required 112,000 frames, all drawn by Nibbelink on a Wacom tablet directly into Flash 4 in combination with Moho software. While it received mixed-to-negative ratings, it won an award in Best in Show at the Southwest Film Festival.

== Plot ==
Warring Capulet's herd and Montague's herd, portrayed as Steller sea lions and California sea lions respectively, have their feud watched in horror and astonishment by Capulet's only daughter, Juliet. A fight on the shore is ended when the Prince, an elephant seal, appears and warns the two groups that, if there is any more disturbance, the seal who caused it shall be exiled to Shark Island where his henchman Sharky lives. Romeo, Montague's only son, is depressed, wishing to fall in love with someone. His humorous and rebellious friend, Mercutio, urges him and another of his friends, Benvolio, to go to a Capulet party later that evening. They attend the party, covered in white sand to look like Capulets, and Romeo falls in love with Juliet at first sight. Juliet, however, was promised by her father to marry the Prince, who attends the party. Romeo and his friends manage to wreak havoc, and are revealed to be Montagues. Later that evening, the play's balcony scene is recreated on a cliff on the beach where a tree grows. Romeo promises Juliet that they shall marry the next morning, and she will not have to marry the Prince.

Romeo begs Friar Lawrence the sea otter, to wed them. After some thought, the friar believes their marriage will end the feud between their families, and agrees. Romeo and Juliet are wed that morning and traverse the sea in their happiness. However, even the other sea and land animals strongly oppose their being together. A kissing goldfish named Kissy finds them a lovely couple, but warns them that they will be in big trouble if the Prince finds out. Back on the beach, Mercutio is telling some jokes, which leads to him making insulting jokes against the Capulets, and the Prince is headed in that direction. When he arrives, Mercutio mocks him as well. Romeo rushes to aid his friend, but after a struggle Mercutio falls off the cliff where Juliet met Romeo the previous evening, and everyone thinks that he is dead. The Prince, jealous of Juliet's affection for Romeo, exiles Romeo to Shark Island. In despair, Juliet seeks the Friar's help, and he gives her a potion to put her in a deathlike state. Mercutio is revealed to be alive and sees the whole thing, remarking, "What a tangled web we weave".

Lawrence shows the Capulet seals that Juliet is "dead", right as they were celebrating the marriage. But Benvolio sees her as well, and swims to Shark Island to tell Romeo. The Friar chases him to stop him, but is attacked by Sharky. After receiving the terrible news from Benvolio, Romeo heads to the shore to see if Juliet is truly dead. Friar Lawrence arrives too late and tries to follow Romeo, only to have his tail maimed by Sharky. After an undersea chase and some help from Kissy, the fish Romeo and Juliet met earlier, Lawrence escapes and heads to the beach. A heartbroken Romeo walks past the mourning Capulets and tries to kiss Juliet, only to have some of the potion slip into his own mouth, putting him in a deathlike state as well. Two groups of seals begin to weep for their loss, and Lawrence, who has just arrived, teaches them a lesson about where hatred leads them to evil. Suddenly, Romeo and Juliet awaken, and all is well. Mercutio returns, and the prince finds a new mate, an elephant seal like himself. The movie ends with the two families at peace, and Romeo and Juliet remaining together.

== Cast and characters ==
- Daniel Trippett as Romeo, a kind Montague and Juliet's love interest, later husband.
- Patricia Trippett as Juliet, a Capulet and Romeo's love interest, later wife.
- Chip Albers as Mercutio, Romeo's lighthearted, trouble-making best friend.
- Michael Toland as
  - Capulet, Juliet's father
  - Friar Lawrence, a sea otter and a good friend of Romeo, he knows that Romeo and Juliet shouldn't be married, but realizes that the wedding will stop the rivalry of the two families.
- Stephen Goldberg as Montague, Romeo's father.
- Phil Nibbelink as The Prince, an elephant seal who has rancid breath and a quick temper.
- Chanelle Nibbelink as Kissy the Kissing Fish, a small goldfish who acts as a comic relief.
- Sam Gold as Benvolio, a good friend of Romeo.

== Production ==
=== Background ===
Nibbelink, a former Disney animator, and his wife, Margit Friesacher, founded the independent company Phillip Nibbelink Productions in 1998. He said that he grew tired of the "big industry merry-go-round" and wanted to make films himself. He had independently created two feature-length animated films before Romeo & Juliet: Sealed with a Kiss, Puss in Boots and Leif Ericson: The Boy Who Discovered America. Nibbelink decided to make Romeo and Juliet in 2000, when he was finishing Leif Ericson, and began work on it in early 2003. Nibbelink wanted the film to be a family-friendly version of Shakespeare's original tale, because of the few appropriate family films available at the time.

=== Animation ===
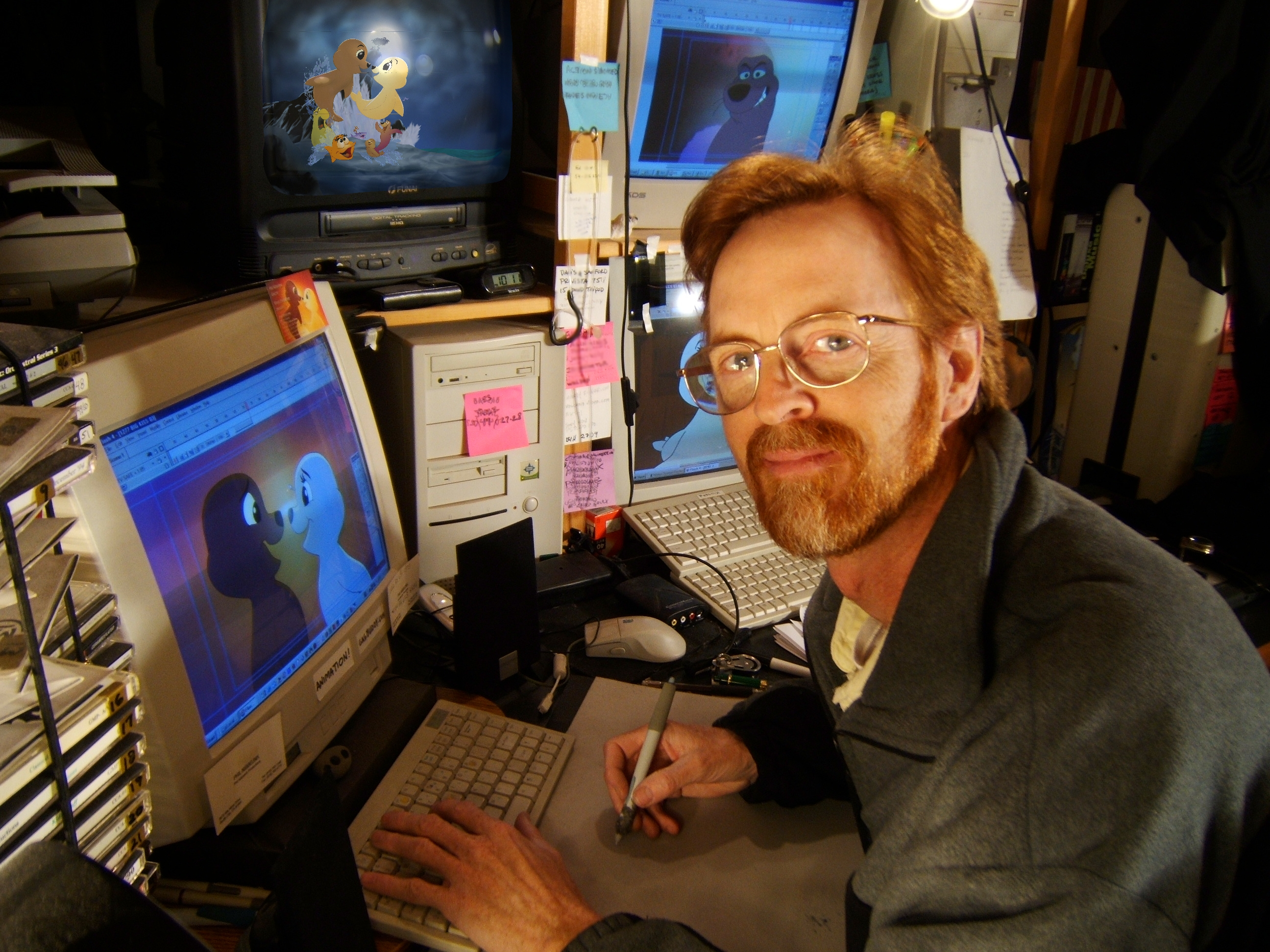
Nibbelink in his studio working on the film.

The film took 4½ years of animating and required 112,000 frames, each of which were completed in under 2 minutes and drawn on a Wacom tablet directly into Flash 4, in combination with Moho software. Nibbelink worked with a tight self-imposed deadline, with all drawings being completed within a month of his original timeline predication. The Moho software was used for the "over-the-shoulder" or the "listening" characters, or crowd scene characters. The film was a half-year in post-production. Nibbelink used Flash 4 because when he tried to migrate to Flash 5, it created forward-compatibility problems. Even cut-and-paste work using Flash 4 and Flash 5 launched at the same time created RAM issues and crashed.

=== Audio ===
Most actors of the film were Nibbelink's friends and children, whose voices he recorded in a studio in his basement. The film's Spanish dub was originally done in Madrid. Nibbelink said his daughter's voice-over was completely unscripted: "I would take these silly improvs that my little daughter would do. I mean, lines like, she would say, 'Babies – p-ew! I hate stinky babies!' I said, 'That's hilarious!' So I would use it".

The film had no official composer. Nibbelink bought melodies from royalty-free music compositions, and wrote the lyrics for the music. These royalty free music companies were Intents Creative Music, British Audio Publishing, Crank City Music, Jack Waldenmaier Music Productions in association with The Music Bakery, River City Sound Productions, Bejoodle Music, Fresh Music, and Music 2 Hues. Three songs are included in the film: a version of "Twinkle Twinkle Little Star", performed by Chanelle Nibbelink and arranged by Elva Nibbelink, "Bite My Tail", performed by Michael Toland and arranged by Nibbelink, and "Singing Starfish", performed by Jennifer, Russell, and Gigi Nibbelink.

== Release ==
=== Theatrical release ===
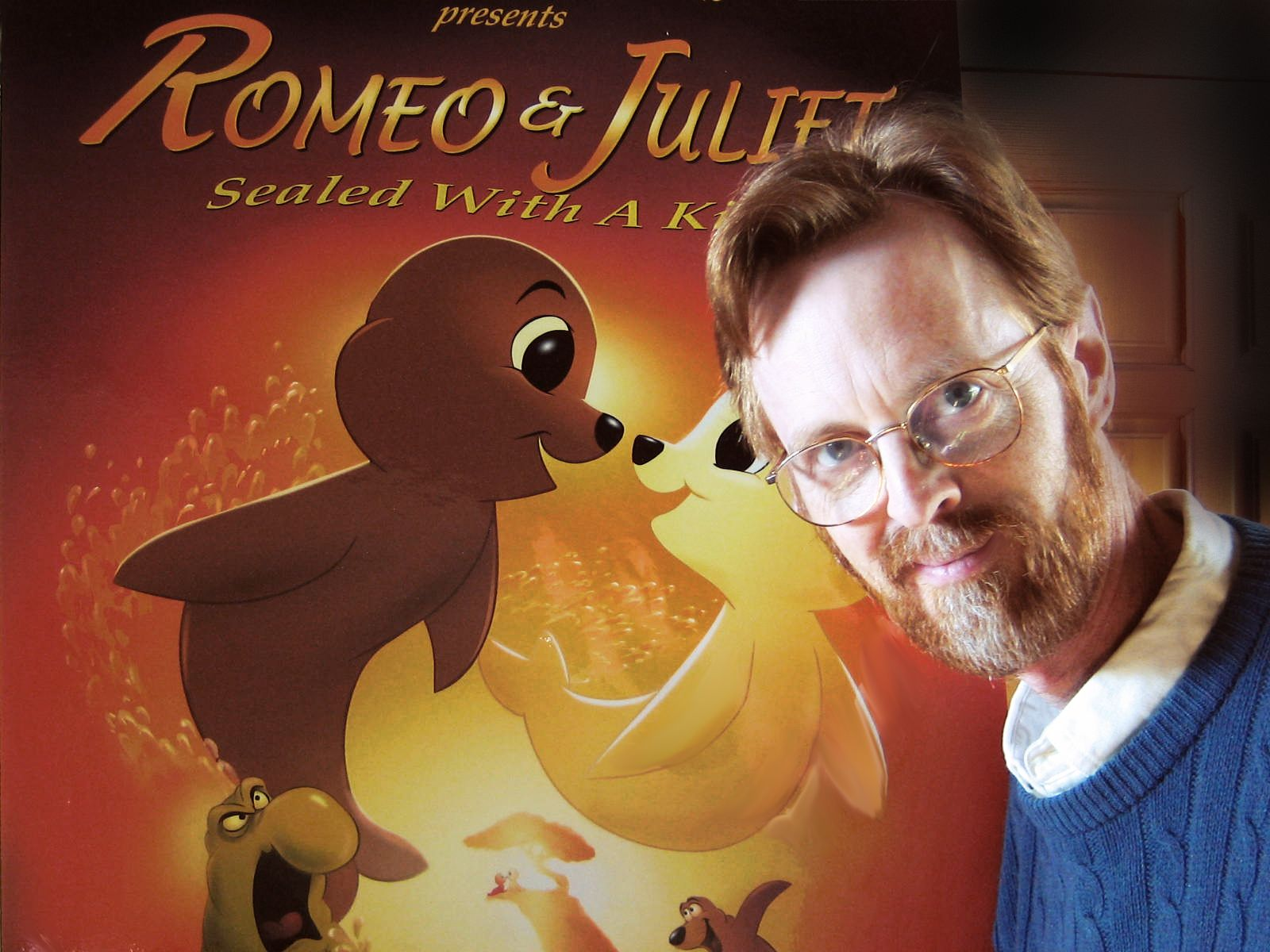
Nibbelink standing in front of the poster for the film.

Nibbelink tried to sell the film to 800 people, and was picked up by distributors MarVista Entertainment for release in foreign territories and Indican Pictures for a domestic release. A preview of the film was screened at Sony Pictures Entertainment in Los Angeles, California on November 17, 2004, and the film was later showcased at the 2005 Asia Television Forum in Singapore. It was released as Fofita, una foquita la mar de salada to 32 theaters in Madrid and Seville on June 23, 2006.

The film had a domestic total of $463,002 in its 34-week (238-day) box office run. On opening weekend in 2006, the film, which debuted in Los Angeles, California, grossed $80,938, with an average of $4,220. That same week, it grossed a total $109,720. The film closed its box office run on July 19, 2007, having grossed just $895 that same week. Despite being a minor box office bomb, as of June 2013, the film is the third most profitable film released by Indican Pictures.

=== Home media ===
The film was released to DVD on June 12, 2007. Animatedviews.com's Ben Simon, in his review of the DVD, gave it an overall 7 out of 10, praising the large bonus content for a low-budget film, but criticizing the glitchy sound and audio of the feature. A giveaway was previously held in 2005 by Abbey Home Media and Courier Kids, and the prize was a DVD copy of the film and a toy seal. Ten copies were given. Reissuing this film on DVD and a Blu-ray release of it have yet to be scheduled.

=== Online streaming ===
The film was available to stream on Netflix, but is eventually taken down in 2016. It was also available to purchase on iTunes and Amazon Prime, but removed from the sites in 2018. As of today, Lionsgate holds the film's streaming rights via their purchase of Starz in 2016.

== Critical reception ==
The film was negatively received by critics. Review aggregation website Rotten Tomatoes reports that only 20% of critics gave the film a positive review, with an average rating of 3/10, based on 5 reviews. Movies.com's Dave White compared what he considered the film's poor animation to the animation of The Wild, and criticized some dialogue of the film judged "vaguely Shakespearean", sarcastically writing that "children love 16th-century English pronouns". Sam Adams of the Los Angeles Times called the film a "genuine tragedy, although not in the Shakespearean sense" and wrote that a "comprehensive list of what's wrong with Romeo & Juliet: Sealed With a Kiss would stretch farther than the unabridged works of William S." LA Weekly's Luke Y. Thompson said that the film "should find its primary audience among college potheads who like to watch '70s Hanna-Barbera creations on the Cartoon Network late at night". Common Sense Media writer Renee Schonfeld said in his 2012 review that it was "an amateurish effort with a grating villain, tired jokes, and sub-par music". He gave it 2 out of 5 stars.

Despite the mostly negative reviews, most critics did commend Nibbelink for animating the entire film by himself.

In contrast, Reel.com's Pam Grady gave the film a 2.5 out of 4, saying that, "surprisingly, it's not terrible". Animatedviews.com's Ben Simon defended the film, saying it was "a charming little movie" that remains faithful to Shakespeare's text. The film won two awards at the Southwest Film Festival, in the animation and Best in Show category.
