= Souvenir (play) =

Judy Kaye as Florence Foster Jenkins in Souvenir

Souvenir is a two-character play, with incidental music, by Stephen Temperley.

== Overview ==
In a Greenwich Village supper club in 1964, Cosmé McMoon flashes back to the musical career of Florence Foster Jenkins, a wealthy socialite with a famously uncertain sense of pitch and key. In 1932, she met mediocre pianist Cosmé McMoon, and the two teamed up in the hope of achieving success. Over the next dozen years, their bizarre partnership yielded hilariously off-key recitals that became the talk of New York City, earning them cultish fame. The play culminates in a sold-out performance at Carnegie Hall in 1944, where the audience "turns on her in gales of derisive guffaws."

Judy Kaye plays "the one who gets to hilariously murder the music of Mozart, Verdi, Gounod and Brahms and to wear more of Tracy Christensen's elegant as well as spectacularly silly costumes than a whole ensemble in a more populated musical." The play's title, Souvenir, comes from Jenkins insisting on recording "Queen of the Night" (Mozart), saying that when her voice is not as strong, the recording will make "a lovely souvenir."

== Productions ==
The play was produced by the Off-Broadway York Theatre Company running from November 23, 2004 to January 2, 2005. The production was directed by Vivian Matalon and starred Judy Kaye and Jack Lee.

The play opened on Broadway on November 10, 2005 at the Lyceum Theatre, where it ran for 68 performances and fourteen previews. Directed by Vivian Matalon (who originally suggested the subject matter to Temperley), Judy Kaye and Donald Corren comprised the cast. Kaye was nominated for both the 2006 Tony and 2005 Drama Desk Award for her performance.

The Lyric Stage Company, Boston staged Souvenir in February 2007; their production featured direction by Spiro Veloudos, and starred Leigh Barrett as Jenkins, with Will McGarrahan as Cosmé. Barrett won the Elliot Norton Award - Outstanding Actress in a Musical.

The San Jose Repertory Theater staged the West-Coast premiere of Souvenir in March and April 2008, with Mark Anders playing Cosmé McMoon and Patti Cohenour as Florence Foster Jenkins.

San Francisco's American Conservatory Theater staged the play in early 2009, with Judy Kaye and Donald Corren reprising their Broadway roles as Florence Foster Jenkins and Cosmé McMoon, and Vivian Matalon again directing.

The Flat Rock Playhouse, Flat Rock, North Carolina staged Souvenir in their 2013 season. Carl Danielsen played Cosmé McMoon and Linda Edwards played Florence Foster Jenkins.

The Fortune Theare, Dunedin, New Zealand; 2014, The NZ Premiere of the play directed by Lara MacGregor, with Angela Johnson as Florence, and Michael Lee Porter as Cosme.

A German translation was shown in 2013 at the Komödie im Bayerischen Hof in Munich with Désirée Nick as Foster Jenkins.

The Colorado Springs Fine Arts Center staged a production of Souvenir as part of their 2016-2017 season. Sally Hybl played Jenkins and Jerry McCauley played McMoon.

The Milwaukee Repertory Theatre staged a production of Souvenir for their 2017-2018 season in their Stackner Caberet. Marguerite Willbanks played Florence Foster Jenkins and Jack Forbes Wilson played Cosmé McMoon.

Rep Stage in Columbia, Maryland, staged a production of Souvenir for its 2019-2020 season. It starred Actors' Equity Association members Grace Bauer as Jenkins and Alan Naylor as McMoon. Joseph W. Ritsch directed.
