= Puss in Boots (1999 film) =

- DVD cover
- Directed by: Phil Nibbelink
- Written by: Jacob Grimm (story); Phil Nibbelink
- Produced by: Margit Friesacher; Eric Parkinson
- Starring: Judge Reinhold; Dan Haggerty; Michael York; Vivian Schilling
- Edited by: Phil Nibbelink
- Production company: Phil Nibbelink Productions
- Distributed by: Allumination; Plaza Entertainment (United States); Showcase International (international)
- Release dates: January 1, 1999 (theatrical); July 6, 1999 (home media)
- Running time: 75 minutes
- Country: United States
- Language: English

Puss in Boots is a 1999 American animated adventure comedy film directed by Phil Nibbelink. It is based on the fairy tale of the same name.

The film features the voices of Judge Reinhold, Dan Haggerty, Michael York, and Vivian Schilling.

== Plot ==
Puss in Boots serves as the narrator at the beginning of the film. He says that he used to belong to a poor miller and his three sons, the youngest being Gunther. Despite being the favorite, Gunther only inherits Puss after his father's passing while his older brothers, Zeek and Zak, inherit the mill and their father's donkey respectively. Zeek and Zak, envious of Gunther, kick him and Puss out.

Puss and Gunther walk through town when a carriage carrying the princess speeds past them, followed by a shape-shifting ogre who wants to marry the princess. The princess' carriage breaks loose during the chase and falls down a cliff. Puss and Gunther take the princess and her cat to the mill, where they are able to temporarily defeat the ogre, with Gunther and the princess becoming attracted to each other. The princess returns to the castle to tell her father, the king, that the ogre will return. Smitten with the princess' cat, Puss decides to get into the castle to see her again. He has Gunther buy a pair of boots for him, along with a cape and hat. Puss then enters the castle to entertain the king and princess. The ogre returns and threatens to destroy the kingdom if the princess does not marry him by sundown, taking her beloved cat as leverage so she won't betray him. The princess decides to comply with the ogre's demands.

Puss devises a new plan. He has Gunther pose as the "Marquis of Carabas", a nobleman who can defeat the ogre. Puss directs the coachman to the Palace of Carabas, which is really the ogre's castle and manages to arrive before them. He tricks the ogre into turning himself into a mouse and eats him. Then, as the carriage arrives, the ogre escapes Puss's mouth and exposes Gunther as a fraud. The ogre throws Puss and Gunther into the dungeon below the castle and takes the princess inside to marry her. In the dungeon, Puss and Gunther have a brief falling out before quickly reconciling and escaping the dungeon with help from the princess' cat. Just before the ogre can marry the princess, Puss and Gunther break in and defeat him.

With the ogre gone, Gunther marries the princess while Puss marries her cat.

== Cast ==
- Michael York – Puss in Boots
- Judge Reinhold – Gunther
- Dan Haggerty – The King
- Vivian Schilling – Princess (singing voice by Scottie Haskell)
- Kevin Dorsey – Ogre
- Patrick Pinney – Zeek, Coachman, Cobbler, Soldiers
- Charles von Bernuth – Zak
- Phil Nibbelink – Jester

== See also ==
- List of animated films
