= Judy Kaye =

American singer and actress

- Education: University of California, Los Angeles
- Occupations: Singer, actress
- Years active: 1972–present
- Spouse: David Green

Judy Kaye is an American singer and actress. She has appeared in stage musicals, plays, and operas. Kaye has been in long runs on Broadway in the musicals The Phantom of the Opera (earning her first Tony Award), Ragtime, Mamma Mia!, and (in a second Tony award-winning role) Nice Work If You Can Get It.

== Early life ==
Kaye attended UCLA, studying drama and voice. "Her voice spans three octaves. She started out as a mezzo and now sings all the way up to an E natural...but basically she feels she is now a soprano." She "easily shifts between Broadway belt and soaring soprano" according to Playbill.com.

== Career ==
Kaye made her Broadway debut as a replacement Rizzo in the original company of Grease in the 1970s. Her next show was the Broadway musical On the Twentieth Century (1978), playing only the small role of the maid Agnes, and also the understudy for leading lady Madeline Kahn. Kahn left the show early in the run, and Kaye took over the lead role. The New York Times reported "Judy Kaye replaced Madeline Kahn...and bang, boom, overnight she is a star." Kaye also toured the US in the musical.

Her next two Broadway ventures flopped. The Moony Shapiro Songbook (1981), a campy spoof of songwriter-based revues like Side by Side by Sondheim and Ain't Misbehavin', closed after fifteen previews and one official performance. Frank Rich, in his New York Times review, wrote "Two members of the company suggest what might have been - Judy Kaye, a skilled musical-comedy comedienne who sings a pretty ballad at a white piano." In November 1981 Oh, Brother!, which transplanted William Shakespeare's The Comedy of Errors to the Middle East, closed after thirteen previews and three official performances. Frank Rich's New York Times review noted that "Judy Kaye, while getting campier each time out, remains a big belter with a sure comic sense."

She was featured in the 1987 concert version of the rarely produced musical Magdalena. In 1988, Kaye returned to Broadway as Carlotta in The Phantom of the Opera, She won the 1988 Tony Award for Best Featured Actress in a Musical for this role.

It was nearly a decade before her next Broadway role, appearing as Emma Goldman in Ragtime from 1997 to 2000. She was the only principal to remain with that show for its entire run, where she showcased her remarkable range as she sang the Goldman alto part while hitting the B5 high note in the opening prologue. In 2000, she played Mrs. Lovett opposite Len Cariou as Todd and Davis Gaines as Anthony in a London concert of Sweeney Todd: The Demon Barber of Fleet Street. Next on Broadway, she appeared as "Rosie" in Mamma Mia! in 2001–2003, and received a Tony Award nomination as Best Featured Actress in a Musical.

Kaye has performed extensively in regional theatre, in roles as widely varied as both Julie Jordan and Nettie Fowler in Carousel, Annie Oakley in Annie Get Your Gun, Nellie Forbush in South Pacific, Meg in Brigadoon, Hildy in On the Town, Lalume in Kismet, Lili Vanessi in Kiss Me, Kate, Pistache in Can-Can, Babe Williams in The Pajama Game, the Old Lady in Candide, Maria in The Sound of Music, Rose in Gypsy, Anna in The Anastasia Game, Aldonza in Man of La Mancha, Lucy in You're a Good Man, Charlie Brown, Sally in Follies (1995, Theatre Under the Stars), Mary Magdalene in Jesus Christ Superstar.

Kaye's non-musical roles have included such classics as The Man Who Came to Dinner and You Can't Take It with You (1996, Connecticut Repertory Theatre, Storrs). In 1996 she performed in The Royal Family at the McCarter Theater in Princeton, New Jersey as Kitty Dean. She appeared in Lost in Yonkers in 2011 as Grandma Kurnitz at the Arizona Theatre Company in Phoenix, Arizona.

Kaye appeared in Stephen Temperley's Souvenir and "drew raves for her humorous, yet touching work" with her portrayal of the legendarily bad singer Florence Foster Jenkins. The play originally ran Off-Broadway in November 2004 to January 2005. After a production at the Berkshire Theatre Festival in August to September 2005, it premiered on Broadway, from October 2005 to January 2006, and she has since performed it in several venues in the United States. Ben Brantley, in his New York Times review, wrote: "Ms. Kaye strikes that single note of personality with a happy mixture of ardor, unblinking obliviousness and ... pitch-perfect period detail."

In June 2006, Kaye assumed the role of Mrs. Lovett in Sweeney Todd on Broadway for one week during Patti LuPone's vacation. She returned in August 2006, when LuPone left for a week to play "Rose" in Gypsy. She went on to play Mrs. Lovett in the 2007–2008 North American Tour of Sweeney Todd. The Curtain Up review of that tour in Los Angeles praised Kaye, stating: "There's humor in this production ... Much of that is due to Kaye's impeccable timing, the delicacy of her yearning and her way with a tuba." Kaye had previously played Mrs. Lovett in the Paper Mill Playhouse production of Sweeney in 1991. The New York Times reviewer wrote of her performance there, "it's going to be tough to come up with a Todd and a Mrs. Lovett comparable to George Hearn and Judy Kaye. ... Ms. Kaye's voluptuous voice taps and illuminates musical treasures. The ribaldry, seductiveness and wit of her performance appear thoroughly rooted in Mrs. Lovett's love for Todd."

The musical Paradise Found featured Kaye in a production co-directed by Harold Prince and Susan Stroman at the Menier Chocolate Factory in London from May – June 2010. She appeared in the musical adaption of Tales of the City at the American Conservatory Theater, San Francisco, California, from May through July 2011, as Anna Madrigal.

She starred in the musical Nice Work If You Can Get It, which opened on Broadway in April 2012. She won the Tony Award, Drama Desk Award and Outer Critics Circle Award for this role. In 2014, she played General Matila Cartwright in Guys and Dolls at Carnegie Hall. Later that year, she joined the Broadway production of Cinderella as the Fairy Godmother and remained with the show till its final performance on January 3, 2015.

From February to October 2016, Kaye performed the role of Madame Morrible in the Broadway production of Wicked. She then took over the role of the Dowager Empress in the Broadway production of Anastasia from September 2018 through January 2019.

On November 17, 2021, Kaye opened in the Broadway production of Diana, The Musical at the Longacre Theater. She plays the roles of Queen Elizabeth II and the novelist Barbara Cartland, who was Princess Diana's step-grandmother.

=== Opera, operetta, and recordings ===
She has performed frequently in opera, operetta and older musicals, including leading roles in The Beggar's Opera, Orpheus in the Underworld, Leave It to Jane, Oh, Lady! Lady!!, The Cat and the Fiddle, and Trouble in Tahiti. She appeared in concert at The Town Hall, New York, in Eileen and Sweethearts (1983) and Sweet Adeline (1985).

In August 1990 she played Musetta in the Santa Fe Opera production of La Bohème. She debuted the role of Abbie in the premiere of composer Edward Thomas' musical version of Eugene O'Neill's Desire Under the Elms, presented by the New York Opera Repertory Theater in 1989. She performed the title role in The Merry Widow at the Paper Mill Playhouse (Millburn, New Jersey) in 1991. She has appeared with opera companies and orchestras such as the Santa Fe Opera (1985 and 1990), the New York City Opera (1989), the New York Philharmonic (1990), the Boston Pops Orchestra (1990), and the London Symphony Orchestra (1990).

Kaye has made several recordings, including Where, Oh, Where?: Rare Songs of the American Theater (Premier), Diva to Diva (Varèse Sarabande), which focus on musical theatre and "great musical theatre women", and Judy Kaye: Songs From The Silver Screen (Varèse Sarabande), saluting women singing in movie musicals. Two other CDs partner her with the baritone William Sharp, one an all-George Gershwin program, the other all-Leonard Bernstein; the latter includes the world-premiere recording of Bernstein's Arias and Barcarolles.

Kaye is featured on six tracks of John McGlinn's EMI disc Broadway Showstoppers, four of them numbers from Jerome Kern's Sweet Adeline (including the ballad "Why Was I Born?") and one a first-ever recording of the "Duet for One (The First Lady of the Land)", the tour-de-force from Leonard Bernstein and Alan Jay Lerner's 1600 Pennsylvania Avenue. She was featured on the 1997 Varèse Sarabande studio recording of the 1965 musical Drat! The Cat!

=== Kinsey Millhone books ===
Kaye is the voice for the audiobooks of Sue Grafton's Kinsey Millhone series.

== Personal life ==
Kaye lives in New Jersey with her husband, David Green, in an apartment overlooking Manhattan.

== Stage ==
Year	Title	Role	Venue	Ref.
1968	You're a Good Man, Charlie Brown	Lucy Van Pelt	Regional, Los Angeles Civic Light Opera	
1969	Fiddler on the Roof	Hodel	Regional, Hawaii Civic Light Opera	
1971	Fiddler on the Roof	Tzeitel	Regional, Sacramento Music Circus	
1972	Grease	Betty Rizzo	Broadway, Eden Theatre	
1972	Grease	Betty Rizzo	U.S. National Tour	
1972	Jesus Christ Superstar	Mary Magdalene	U.S. National Tour	
1975	Jesus Christ Superstar	Mary Magdalene	Regional, Sacramento Music Circus	
1976	Jesus Christ Superstar	Mary Magdalene	Regional, Casa Mañana	
1977	Jesus Christ Superstar	Mary Magdalene	Regional, Paper Mill Playhouse	
1978	On The Twentieth Century	Agnes	Broadway, St. James Theatre	
1978	On The Twentieth Century	Lily Garland	Broadway, St. James Theatre	
1979	On The Twentieth Century	Agnes	U.S. National Tour	
1979	On The Twentieth Century	Lily Garland	U.S. National Tour	
1980	Carousel	Julie Jordan	Regional, Coachlight Dinner Theatre	
1981	The Moony Shapiro Songbook	Miscellaneous	Broadway, Morosco Theatre	
1981	Oh, Brother!	Saroyana	Broadway, ANTA Playhousel	
1983	The Sound of Music	Maria Rainer	Regional, Paper Mill Playhouse	
1984	What About Luv?	Ellen	Off-Broadway, Audrey Wood Theatre	
1984	Sweeney Todd: The Demon Barber of Fleet Street	Mrs. Lovett	Regional, Michigan Opera Theatre	
1985	Windy City	Molly Malloy	Regional, Paper Mill Playhouse	
1986	No, No, Nanette	Lucille Early	Off-Broadway, Carnegie Hall	
1986	Going Hollywood	Performer	Regional, Paper Mill Playhouse	
1986	Kismet	Lalume	Regional, Canadian Opera Company	
1987	Magdalena	Performer	Concert, Lincoln Center Theatre	
1987	Annie Get Your Gun	Annie Oakley	Regional, Paper Mill Playhouse	
1987	Kismet	Lalume	Off-Broadway, New York City Opera	
1988	South Pacific	Nellie Forbush	Regional, Paper Mill Playhouse	
1988	The Phantom of the Opera	Carlotta Guidicelli	Broadway, Majestic Theatre	
1989	On The Town	Hildy Esterhazy	Off-Broadway, New York City Opera	
1989	The Pajama Game	Babe Williams	Regional, New York City Opera	
1989	The Anastasia Game	Anna	Regional, Merrimack Repertory Theatre	
1990	Gypsy	Mama Rose	Regional, Paper Mill Playhouse	
1991	Can-Can	La Môme Pistache	Regional, Paper Mill Playhouse	
1991	The Merry Widow	Hanna Glawari	Regional, Paper Mill Playhouse	
1992	Sweeney Todd: The Demon Barber of Fleet Street	Mrs. Lovett	Regional, Paper Mill Playhouse	
1993	Cather County	Performer	Off-Broadway, Playwrights Horizons	
1995	Follies	Sally	Regional, 5th Avenue Theatre	
1995	The Man Who Came to Dinner	Maggie Cutler	Regional, The Civic Theatre	
1995	Man of La Mancha	Aldonza/Dulcinea	Regional, The Civic Theatre	
1996	Brigadoon	Meg Brockie	Off-Broadway, New York City Opera	
1996	You Can't Take It With You	Penelope Sycamore	Regional, Connecticut Repertory Theatre	
1996	The Royal Family	Kitty Dean	Regional, McCarter Theatre	
1997	Candide	The Old Lady	Off-Broadway, New York City Opera	
1997	Ragtime	Emma Goldman	Regional, Shubert Theatre, Los Angeles, CA	
1998	Ragtime	Emma Goldman	Broadway, Ford's Center for Performing Arts	
2001	Kiss Me, Kate	Lili Vanessi	Regional, Glimmerglass Opera	
2001	Gypsy	Mama Rose	Regional, 5th Avenue Theatre	
2001	Mamma Mia!	Rosie	Broadway, Winter Garden Theatre	
2005	Souvenir	Florence Foster Jenkins	Broadway, Lyceum Theatre	
2006	Sweeney Todd: The Demon Barber of Fleet Street	Mrs. Lovett	Broadway, Eugene O'Neill Theatre	
2007	Sweeney Todd: The Demon Barber of Fleet Street	Mrs. Lovett	U.S. National Tour	
2007	Souvenir	Florence Foster Jenkins	Regional, Arizona Theatre Company	
2009	Souvenir	Florence Foster Jenkins	Regional, American Conservatory Theater	
2009	Souvenir	Florence Foster Jenkins	Regional, CenterStage Baltimore	
2009	Souvenir	Florence Foster Jenkins	Regional, Asolo Repertory Theatre	
2009	Souvenir	Florence Foster Jenkins	Regional, Geva Theatre Center	
2010	Lost in Yonkers	Grandma Kurnitz	Regional, Old Globe Theatre	
2010	Paradise Found	Frau Mantzner	London, Menier Chocolate Factory	
2010	Bells Are Ringing	Sue Summers	Off-Broadway, New York City Center	
2011	Lost in Yonkers	Grandma Kurnitz	Regional, Arizona Theatre Company	
2011	Tales of the City	Anna Madrigal	Regional, American Conservatory Theater	
2011	Saving Amy	Minnie Kennedy	Regional, 5th Avenue Theatre	
2012	Nice Work If You Can Get It	Duchess Estonia Dulworth	Broadway, Imperial Theatre	
2013	Rodgers and Hammerstein's Cinderella	Marie	Broadway, Broadway Theatre	
2017	Wicked	Madame Morrible	U.S. National Tour	
2017	Sousatzka	Countess	Regional, Elgin Theatre	
2018	Anastasia	Dowager Empress	Broadway, Broadhurst Theatre	
2019	Diana	Queen Elizabeth	Regional, La Jolla Playhouse	
2021	Diana	Queen Elizabeth	Broadway, Longacre Theatre	
2022	Wicked	Madame Morrible	Broadway, Gershwin Theatre	
2023	'Til Death	Mary	Off-Broadway, Abdington Theatre Company	
2024	Ibsen's Ghost: An Irresponsible Biographical Fantasy	Magdalene Kragh Thoresen	Regional, George Street Playhouse	
2024	Ibsen's Ghost: An Irresponsible Biographical Fantasy	Magdalene Kragh Thoresen	Off-Broadway, 59E59 Theatres	
2024	Babbitt	Storyteller 6	Regional, Shakespeare Theatre Company	
2025	Driving Miss Daisy	Daisy Werthan	Regional, Theatre Aspen	

== Awards and nominations ==
Year	Award	Category	Work	Result	Ref.
1978	Drama Desk Award	Outstanding Actress in a Musical	On the Twentieth Century	Nominated	
1978	Theatre World Award		On the Twentieth Century	Honouree	
1988	Tony Award	Best Featured Actress in a Musical	The Phantom of the Opera	Won	
1988	Drama Desk Award	Outstanding Featured Actress in a Musical	The Phantom of the Opera	Nominated	
2002	Tony Award	Best Featured Actress in a Musical	Mamma Mia!	Nominated	
2002	Drama Desk Award	Outstanding Featured Actress in a Musical	Mamma Mia!	Nominated	
2005	Drama Desk Award	Outstanding Actress In A Play	Souvenir	Nominated	
2005	Drama League Award	Distinguished Performance	Souvenir	Nominated	
2005	Lucille Lortel Award	Outstanding Lead Actress	Souvenir	Nominated	
2006	Tony Award	Best Actress In A Play	Souvenir	Nominated	
2012	Tony Award	Best Featured Actress in a Musical	Nice Work If You Can Get It	Won	
2012	Drama Desk Award	Outstanding Featured Actress In A Musical	Nice Work If You Can Get It	Won	
2012	Outer Critics Circle Award	Outstanding Featured Actress In A Musical	Nice Work If You Can Get It	Won	
2022	Golden Raspberry Awards	Worst Supporting Actress	Diana	Won	
2026	Henry Award	Outstanding Performance in a Play	Driving Miss Daisy	Nominated	
