= Hudson Talbott =

American author and illustrator (1949–2026)

- Born: July 11, 1949; Louisville, Kentucky, U.S.
- Died: January 22, 2026 (aged 76); New York State, U.S.
- Occupations: Author, illustrator
- Writing career
- Years active: 1980–2024
- Notable work: We're Back: A Dinosaur's Story

Hudson Talbott (July 11, 1949 – January 22, 2026) was an American author and illustrator known for his children's books.

== Early life and education ==
Talbott was born on July 11, 1949, in Louisville, Kentucky. He was the youngest of four children. His father was a bank manager and his mother managed a dress shop.

Talbott went to the University of Cincinnati and then transferred to the Tyler School of Art at Temple University. There he studied sculpture and painting, spending his junior year abroad at a campus of the school in Rome. He graduated with a BFA in 1971.

== Career ==
Talbott wrote and illustrated over 27 books, including A Walk In The Words, From Wolf to Woof!, It's All About ME-ow and River of Dreams - The Story of the Hudson River, which was made into a musical by composer Frank Cuthbert. Talbott collaborated with Stephen Sondheim on a book version of the composer's musical Into The Woods. He illustrated the Newbury Honor winner Show Way (written by Jacqueline Woodson), and the ALA Notable and VOYA Honor book Leonardo's Horse (written by Jean Fritz). His most famous work, We're Back! A Dinosaur's Story was adapted into an animated film of the same name in 1993.

== Personal life and death ==
Talbott lived in Catskill, New York. He died on January 22, 2026, at the age of 76. His place of death is reported variously as Greene County or Albany, New York.
