= We're Back! A Dinosaur's Story (film) =

1993 animated film

- Theatrical release poster by Drew Struzan
- Directed by: Dick Zondag; Ralph Zondag; Phil Nibbelink; Simon Wells
- Screenplay by: John Patrick Shanley
- Based on: We're Back! A Dinosaur's Story by Hudson Talbott
- Produced by: Stephen Hickner
- Starring: John Goodman; Blaze Berdahl; Rhea Perlman; Jay Leno; René Le Vant; Felicity Kendal; Charles Fleischer; Walter Cronkite; Joey Shea; Julia Child; Kenneth Mars; Yeardley Smith; Martin Short
- Edited by: Nick Fletcher; Sim Evan-Jones
- Music by: James Horner
- Production companies: Amblin Entertainment; Amblimation
- Distributed by: Universal Pictures
- Release date: November 24, 1993
- Running time: 71 minutes
- Countries: United Kingdom; United States
- Language: English
- Budget: $20 million
- Box office: $9.3 million

We're Back! A Dinosaur's Story is a 1993 animated adventure comedy film directed by Dick Zondag, Ralph Zondag, Phil Nibbelink, and Simon Wells from a screenplay by John Patrick Shanley. Loosely based on the 1987 Hudson Talbott children's book of the same name, its plot follows three dinosaurs and one pterosaur who travel to the present day and become intelligent by eating a "Brain Grain" cereal invented by scientist Captain Neweyes. The film was produced by Steven Spielberg's Amblimation studio and features the voices of John Goodman, Felicity Kendal, Charles Fleischer, Walter Cronkite, Jay Leno, Julia Child, Kenneth Mars, Yeardley Smith, and Martin Short.

We're Back! A Dinosaur's Story was released by Universal Pictures on November 24, 1993; it was marketed as the more family-friendly equivalent of Spielberg's Jurassic Park, which was released in June of the same year. The film received mixed reviews from critics and was a box-office bomb, grossing $9.3 million worldwide.

== Plot ==
In New York City, a young bluebird named Buster runs away from his siblings and meets an intelligent orange Tyrannosaurus named Rex, who is playing golf. He explains to Buster that he was once a ravaging dinosaur and proceeds to tell his personal story.

In the Cretaceous Period, Rex is chasing a small Thescelosaurus, only to be taken aboard a flying time-traveling ship owned by Captain Neweyes, who wants children of the present day to see real dinosaurs from the Mesozoic era. He and his alien assistant Vorb have come to collect four dinosaurs – Rex, a blue Triceratops named Woog, a purple Pterodactyl named Elsa, and a green Parasaurolophus named Dweeb – and give them the cereal 'Brain Grain' to bestow them sentience. Neweyes welcomes them aboard his ship, explains his plan to take them to Dr. Julia Bleeb, who will guide them to the Museum of Natural History, and warns them to avoid Professor Screweyes, his unhinged twin brother who causes mischief after having lost his left eye to a crow in his youth.

Neweyes drops the dinosaurs in the East River in the year 1993, but they are unable to meet up with Dr. Bleeb. They encounter two runaway children willing to help them find the museum – a boy named Louie, who ran away from home in order to join the circus, and a girl named Cecilia, who is neglected by her wealthy parents. To avoid being noticed as real dinosaurs, they pose as animatronics in the Macy's Thanksgiving Day Parade. Their cover is blown, however, when Rex accidentally deflates an Apatosaurus balloon after performing a musical number during the parade. The children at the parade are ecstatic upon realizing that the dinosaurs are real and show no fear towards them. However, the adult citizens panic and run, forcing the dinosaurs to flee to Central Park while being pursued by the police and the army.

Meanwhile, Louie and Cecilia meet Professor Screweyes, who is running the horror-themed "Eccentric Circus". Unaware of his dark nature, the children sign a contract to perform in his troupe. When the dinosaurs arrive to save them, Screweyes devolves the children into mindless chimpanzees using "Brain Drain", pills that are the polar opposite of the Brain Grain cereal. The dinosaurs are forced to consume the pills, which cause them to lose their intelligence and revert to their natural forms, in exchange for Screweyes restoring Louie and Cecilia back into humans and releasing them. The next morning, a friendly clown named Stubbs, who works for Professor Screweyes, informs the two kids about Screweyes' plan to exploit the dinosaurs for their scare potential.

That night, Stubbs helps Louie and Cecilia sneak into the circus, where the dinosaurs perform their terrifying act – Screweyes hypnotizing Rex – before the trick is ruined by a crow turning on flares. Rex grabs and prepares to eat Screweyes, but Louie steps in and talks the Tyrannosaurus out of his vengeance. His and Cecilia's impassioned pleas and loving touch restore the dinosaurs' sentience; Cecilia then admits her love for Louie - who is at first reluctant - and kisses him on the lips. Stubbs resigns from Professor Screweyes' employment and Captain Neweyes arrives in his ship to lift the kids and the dinosaurs out of the circus, leaving an unrepentant Screweyes to be devoured by crows. The dinosaurs arrive at the museum and meet Dr. Bleeb, then are secretly revealed to a crowd of children the next day, fulfilling Neweyes' plan, while Louie and Cecilia reunite and reconcile with their respective parents and become a couple.

Back in the present day, Buster returns to his family, ignoring his siblings' taunts after retaliating against them with a simple gesture while hugging his mother, and Rex bids him good night and asks him to remember his story as he leaves to rejoin his friends at the museum.

== Voice cast ==
- John Goodman as Rex, a kind Tyrannosaurus.
- René Le Vant as Woog, a gluttonous Triceratops.
- Felicity Kendal as Elsa, an elegant Pterodactyl.
- Charles Fleischer as Dweeb, a half-witted Parasaurolophus (an Apatosaurus in the original storyboard and storyline).
- Walter Cronkite as Captain Neweyes, an inventor who brings the dinosaurs to the present.
- Jay Leno as Vorb, an alien that works for Captain Neweyes.
- Joey Shea as Louie, a brave 12-year-old boy from a lower-class background who runs away from his overbearing family to join a circus.
- Julia Child as Dr. Juliet Bleeb, a worker at the Museum of Natural History.
- Kenneth Mars as Professor Screweyes, Captain Neweyes' evil sorcerer twin brother who runs a circus.
- Yeardley Smith as Cecilia Nuthatch, a 12-year-old girl from a wealthy family whose workaholic father and socialite mother often leave her alone.
- Martin Short as Stubbs the Clown, a clown who reluctantly works for Professor Screweyes.
- Blaze Berdahl as Buster the Bird, a young bluebird who is running away from home and is told the film's plot by Rex.
- Rhea Perlman as Buster's Mother

== Production ==
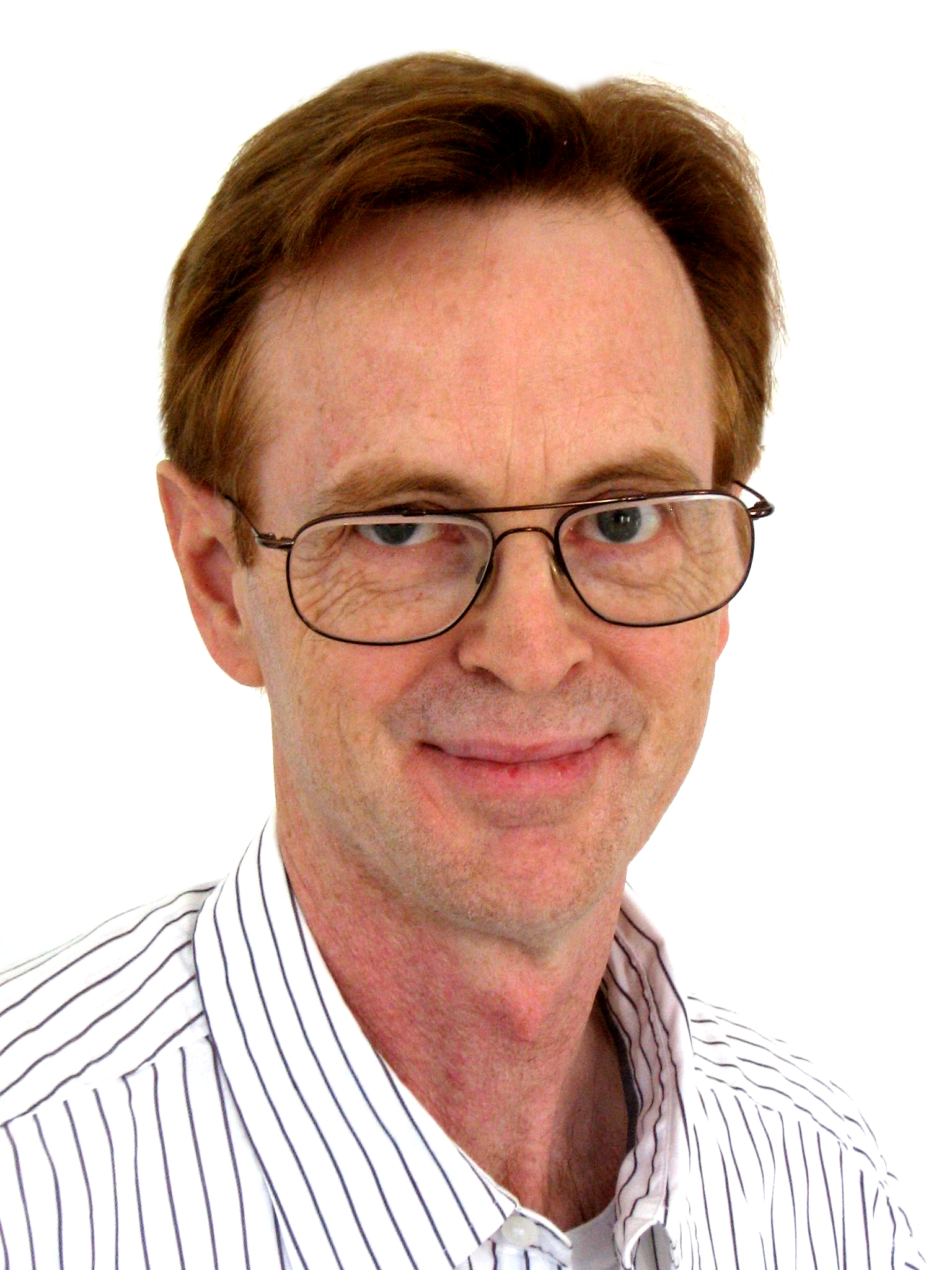
Phil Nibbelink in 2013. He was the most involved of the four directors on the film.

=== Development ===
Hanna-Barbera was the first company to contact Hudson Talbott about obtaining rights to his 1987 book We're Back! A Dinosaur's Story, and the encounter occurred only months after its release; Universal Pictures then paid off Hanna-Barbera and purchased the rights for Steven Spielberg to produce the film through his London-based animation studio, Amblimation. John Musker and Ron Clements were also interested in adapting the book for Walt Disney Feature Animation, as a potential project after The Little Mermaid (1989), but were informed that Universal and Spielberg had already purchased the rights. Musker envisioned their version "like Snow White and the Seven Dwarfs, but a 7-year-old Snow White and with dinosaurs instead of the dwarfs."

Although Talbott had little involvement, he encountered the creators of the film many times during production, including Spielberg who would make several calls to the author from Los Angeles and had a personal meeting with him when he first arrived in London. We're Back! A Dinosaur's Story was directed by Simon Wells, Phil Nibbelink, and the brothers Dick and Ralph Zondag, though Nibbelink was the most involved with the project out of the four directors, while Wells only co-directed during the writing process before he was assigned to direct Balto (1995) shortly after. All of the directors frequently rotated in and out between projects in Amblimation, with We're Back!, Balto and development on a failed animated adaptation of Andrew Lloyd Webber's musical Cats happening at the same time.

Nibbelink and Wells began storyboarding We're Back! in 1990, during the production of An American Tail: Fievel Goes West (1991). The Zondag brothers joined the project a year later, and redid some sequences from scratch, but their alterations were overall minimal. The source material was only 20 pages and lacked any antagonist or sense of a plot, making it difficult to convert to a full-length feature. The first screenplay draft, which was described by executive Douglas Wood as more lighthearted, was written by Flint Dille and Wells, and was not well received by Spielberg. John Patrick Shanley, writer of Moonstruck (1987), had worked with Spielberg on Joe Versus the Volcano (1990). Spielberg hired Shanley to write another draft, which was done quickly and was the script ultimately used. Shanley made his draft darker, which both Wood and Spielberg liked, but Nibbelink disagreed with. Talbott was often skeptical about how the book was being adapted, so Nibbelink instructed the author to have a positive mindset. Talbott felt Shanley's script had none of the book's tongue-in-cheek humor. Likewise, the voice actors and Nibbelink found Shanley's dialogue a bit unnatural, so they changed a few lines while recording; this was not approved by Shanley, however, so recordings of his original dialogue were used in the finished film. Nonetheless, Shanley continued to rewrite and change the script at Spielberg's behest, even through post-production.

=== Animation ===
To ensure scientific accuracy in the dinosaurs' designs, the filmmakers visited the Natural History Museum in London several times to study the dinosaur displays; nonetheless, the animators frequently relied on their own creative instincts. Nibbelink was particularly pleased with the work done by the effects animators, especially on Captain Neweyes' flying ship. We're Back! was also the first animated film not produced by Disney to fully use digital ink-and-paint technology to complete the animation, which was done by the San Diego-based film colorization company American Film Technologies. Additional animation was provided by Character Builders in Columbus, Ohio.

=== Casting ===
Various crew members offered very different accounts of the film's casting process. Nibbelink claimed to have voiced the characters in animatics, which involved successful imitations of notable figures like Walter Cronkite and Julia Child; Spielberg, enjoying Nibbelink's voicing, cast the people that were impersonated in the animatics. According to Shanley, Spielberg cast Child and Cronkite in direct response to his comments that the characters should sound like them. Wood stated that he and the developmental group made the casting choices during meetings, when they received the script. John Goodman started recording the role of Rex just after having his wisdom teeth removed, and healed his face between takes. We're Back! was not Wells' first encounter with Felicity Kendal, who voiced Elsa, as he previously asked to work with her on a student project that she declined. Nibbelink and Wells recorded with Cronkite on a Saturday morning in New York City, but when they arrived for his recording session, he was unable to get into the building due to the doors being locked, and Nibbelink had to apologize to him before the session could begin. Prior to Cronkite's casting as Captain Neweyes, Shanley suggested Mickey Rooney for the role, but was overruled, because Rooney was deemed "too difficult." Wood was most impressed with Martin Short, who showed full commitment to his role as Stubbs the Clown.

Originally, John Malkovich was set to voice the role of Professor Screweyes, but eventually dropped out, allegedly owing to creative differences. According to Nibbelink, Malkovich was let go after Spielberg rejected his performance as too dark and frightening. After Malkovich exited the project, the directors considered Christopher Lloyd to be the voice of Professor Screweyes, but the day they flew out to Boston, where he was in a play at the time, he was unavailable due to a severe cold, and his recording session had to be rescheduled to the following weekend. However, when he did record the role, Spielberg also rejected his performance, because according to Wood, he "just sounded like the character from Back to the Future and a little bit of Jim Ignatowski from Taxi", so the role ultimately went to Kenneth Mars. Similarly, Yaphet Kotto was originally cast as Woog, but had to drop out after only one recording session, so the role went to René Le Vant.

In addition, Spielberg, wanting to truly capture the feeling of New York, decided to include a brief appearance of Larry King fielding radio calls about dinosaur sightings in the city. During the recording session, however, King was uncomfortable with improvising a call-in conversation, so Wood, being a former member of The Second City, did a few improvisations with him of callers calling in.

=== Post-production changes ===
Near the end of production, Spielberg made $1 million worth of alterations at the demand of then-Universal CEO Sidney Sheinberg, following a poor test screening at Universal, including the addition of the Macy's parade scene; the scene features Rex singing a song originally written for the film by James Horner and Thomas Dolby, "Roll Back the Rock", which Little Richard also sings in the end credits.

Other changes that resulted from the test screening included toning down darker aspects of the film; for instance, a significant fragment of Professor Screweyes' fear-based circus, which was fully animated and in color, was deemed too frightening for children, and had to be cut to maintain a G rating. This scene eventually resurfaced on YouTube in May 2009, and contains a portion of Malkovich's original performance. The sequence of Professor Screweyes' demise was also considerably toned down.

=== Music ===
According to Dolby, he was asked by Horner to help him write "Roll Back the Rock", due to Horner's lack of experience with writing rock or pop music, and wrote the song with little input from him. Because Goodman was not a professional singer, his recording was pieced together from different takes. Initially, Dolby had commissioned Tom Jones to sing the end credits cover. Jones had finished his recording, but conflicts with his record label at the time forced Dolby to shelve it and hire Little Richard. Horner also composed the film score, having previously scored Fievel Goes West. According to Nibbelink, however, during the scoring sessions, instead of conducting the score himself as he normally did, Horner hired four freelance composers to conduct while he supervised from the control booth.

== Release and promotion ==
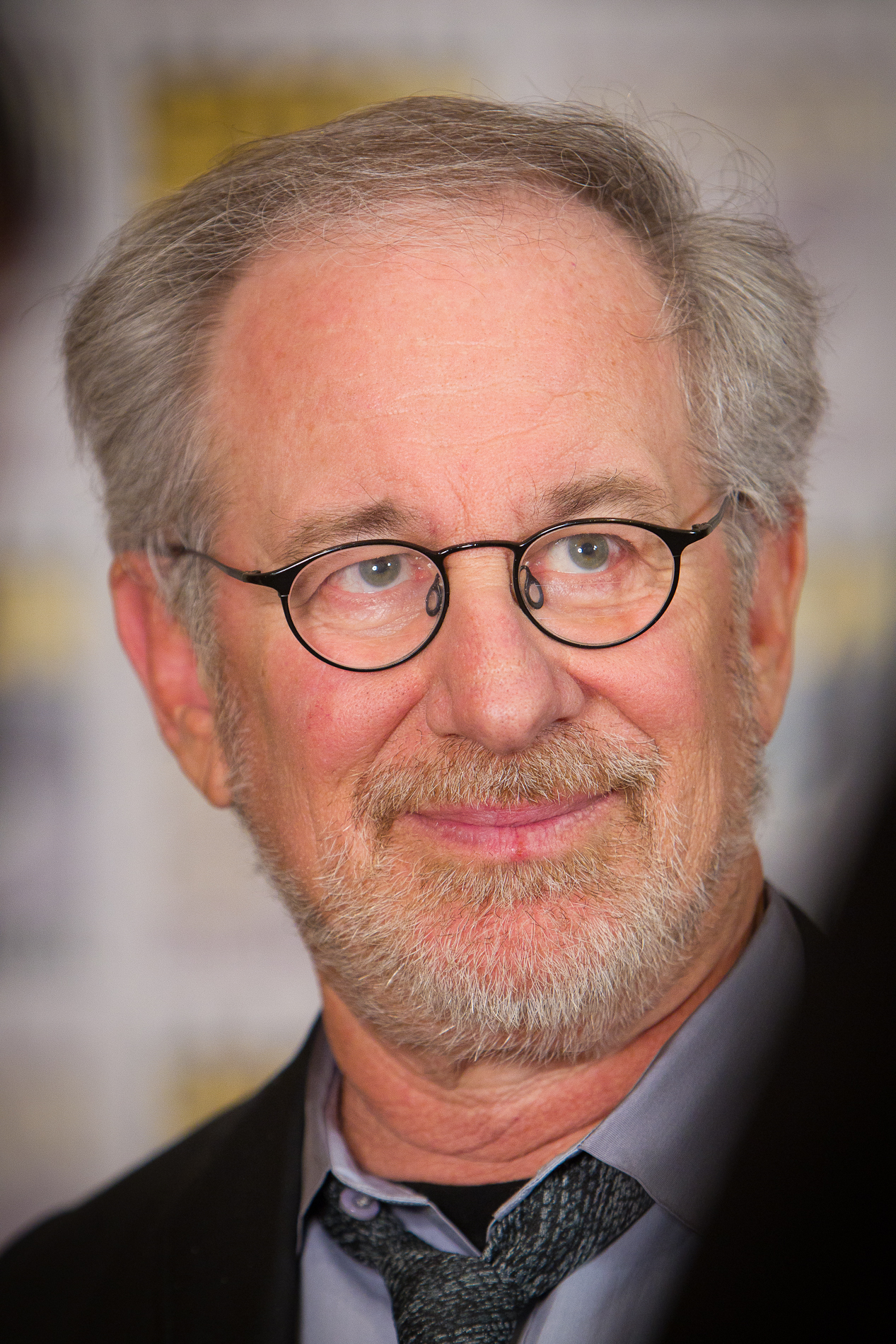
Steven Spielberg in 2011. Two dinosaur films produced by him were released in 1993: Jurassic Park and the more family-friendly We're Back! A Dinosaur's Story.

We're Back! A Dinosaur's Story was meant to capitalize on a craze of dinosaurs in popular culture known as the dinosaur renaissance, which started in the 1960s. The mania included an explosion of dinosaur content in film and television, including television cartoons like Cadillacs and Dinosaurs and Extreme Dinosaurs, with many more produced that were attributed to the release and success of Steven Spielberg's Jurassic Park. We're Back! A Dinosaur's Story was released in the same year as Jurassic Park, and was marketed as the more family-friendly Spielberg-made dinosaur film; the tagline in promotional materials was "A dinosaur adventure for the whole family". Fiction in the dinosaur renaissance presented the creatures in a more friendly and upfront manner; We're Back! A Dinosaur's Story, for example, depicts dinosaurs in an American suburb playing golf, among other anthropomorphic activities.

The film was heavily advertised and promoted with merchandise and fast food tie-ins. A balloon of Rex floated at the real-life 1993 Macy's Thanksgiving Day Parade, which deflated after coming into contact with a traffic light. Hi Tech Expressions also published platform video games based on the film for the Sega Genesis, Game Boy and Super Nintendo Entertainment System (SNES). In the Genesis and SNES games, the player plays as Cecilia and Louie helping the dinosaurs get to the museum, while the Game Boy game, a reskinned version of the existing game Baby T-Rex, involves the dinosaur Rex as a playable character rescuing the other three dinosaurs captured by Screweyes.

We're Back! A Dinosaur's Story was released to American theaters on November 24, 1993. It was released on March 15, 1994, on home video. Each copy included pockets of reusable stickers and coupons for Universal Theme Parks and products from Nestle, The Hertz Corporation, and First Alert.

== Reception ==
=== Box office ===
In the United States, We're Back! A Dinosaur's Story opened during the Thanksgiving holiday with other new entries including Mrs. Doubtfire, A Perfect World and a film adaptation of George Balanchine's The Nutcracker. It grossed $4.6 million on its opening week, well below expectations. Its opening weekend at the time was attributed to snow storms and weather patterns across the country and had also affected the rest of the film box office that weekend. In its second weekend, We're Back! A Dinosaur's Story grossed $1.5 million, a 60% decline. Its run ended with a total gross of $9.3 million, with journalists quickly evaluating its run as a commercial flop. Journalists called the commercial performance of the film an indicator of how difficult it was to compete with Walt Disney Feature Animation, as from a commercial perspective at the time most of Disney's animated features were commercial successes while other animated films released within those years had performed either disappointingly or outright bombed. Steven Hulett of the union Motion Picture Screen Cartoonists argued the low performances of these films, including We're Back! A Dinosaur's Story, resulted to a lack of focus on plot in a story-driven medium like animation.

=== Critical response ===
The film received mixed reviews from professional critics. On Rotten Tomatoes, it has an approval rating of 38% based on 16 professional reviews with an average rating of 4.1/10. Audiences polled by CinemaScore gave the film an average grade of "B" on an A+ to F scale.

An extremely favorable review from Cashbox magazine called it "delightful fun" for children and adults with "warmth, eye-catching visuals and a few chills", while Roger Ebert of the Chicago Sun-Times, in his one-star review, thought it would not compete well in the animated film industry due to its "routine" animation and "shallow and kind of dumb" writing. As a critic for The Baltimore Sun summarized his problems with the film, there were "terrific ideas" which were blurred due to being "lacking in wit, emotion, memorable music and, most importantly, magic"; and the voice actors are "shackled with insipid dialogue and few opportunities to shine". Some journalists, including Ebert, found the film more like a television cartoon for kids than an actual feature. Coverage included unfavorable comparisons to other Spielberg-produced animations, such as series like Tiny Toon Adventures (1990–1992) and Animaniacs (1993–1998) and films such as The Land Before Time (1988), which also featured dinosaurs. Critics also attacked an easter egg as shameless self-promotion for Spielberg, where a poster of Jurassic Park is seen on a theater building during the parade scene.

Several reviews found the story convoluted, Robert W. Butler calling it "complicated and superficial". Butler and Asbury Park Press writer Eleanor O'Sullivan found the flashback framing device pointless and obnoxious, while the Ottawa Citizen's Laura Robin reported inconsistencies, such as with Rex's weight where a light raft holds him yet a bigger dock doesn't. Variety's Daniel M. Kimmel found the villain and his motivations not only convoluted but also ableist, as the film attributes his malevolence to his loss of an eye. Jane Horwitz and Janet Maslin noted other iffy moments, such as the police chase, drugging of dinosaurs, the scary circus scenes, and Screweyes' death. The film was considered cliched, preachy, and unoriginal, such as by Pamella Bruce of the Austin Chronicle; she described it as a rip-off of The Jungle Book (1967) that stole elements of the works of Tim Burton and Alfred Hitchcock. Even a favorable review from the Hartford Courant's Roger Catlin found recycled aspects of the child characters, particularly Cecilia's "poor little rich girl" lifestyle, Louie's Bowery Boys-esque wise-guy attitude, and him running away to join the circus. Reviewers also felt the writing lacked humor and imagination, Pensacola News Journal's Marshall Fine claiming the dialogue was more stuffed than witty.

The fast pacing was also targeted. Some critics argued it caused elements of the writing, particularly its characters, to not fully develop. Robin wrote that Vorb, Stubbs, and Dr. Juliet Bleeb were nothing more than cameos for celebrity voice actors, while Charles Soloman of the Los Angeles Times noted many motivations and feelings of the dinosaurs being unknown, specifically with their relationship with Louie and Cecilia and their sacrificing of intelligence, and argued these unclarities made it difficult to be emotionally invested into them. David Elliot argued the pace didn't allowed for relaxation or moments to be fully emotional, and Soloman similarly opined that it made scenes like the flight through Manhattan far less enjoyable.

The animation was generally acclaimed, a frequently-noted aspect being its mixture of traditional and computer animation. 3D backgrounds, such as those of Manhattan during the flight sequence, were a common highlight, Butler also noting the design of NewEyes' spaceship. Catlin praised the characters as "agreeable and fast-moving", and eagerly noted "all sorts of show-offy animation details such as smoke and shadows". However, the visuals also garnered some lukewarm reactions and were considered inferior to Jurassic Park and the works of Disney. Horwitz felt it "lacks the gorgeous background detail" and "heart-tugging romance" of Disney films. Some critics also panned the non-differentiable designs of the kids.

Multiple reviews positively commented on the voice cast. Some found Cronkite's voice acting one of the film's most hilarious moments. Kimmel called Goodman and Short the top actors, said that Mars and Smith were "handling their chores", and found it amusing Cronkite and Child were voicing animated characters. Robin enjoyed the characters, particularly finding Rex and Captain NewEyes "inspired". Critics also highlighted the Macy's Thanksgiving Day Parade scene, particularly the dinosaurs' performance of "Roll Back the Rock", Kimmel calling it the film's best scene.

=== Accolades ===
Supervising sound editor Alexander Campbell Askew was nominated for Outstanding Achievement in Sound Editing for an Animated Feature at the Motion Picture Sound Editors' Golden Reel Awards.

=== Modern reception ===
Mixed opinions continued in retrospective coverage. Seventeen, in 2017, listed it as one of the 18 best-animated films to view on Netflix; and Country Living, in 2019, included it in a list of the 15 best kid-friendly dinosaur films. On the other hand, The A.V. Club placed it in its 2015 list of the 14 worst dinosaur media; and Paste, that same year, ranked the dinosaur characters the ninth-worst in popular culture, calling them the "silliest, most annoying of the animated dinosaurs". The A.V. Club also ranked Screweyes' devouring by the crows the 19th most terrifying moment in children's entertainment. /Film's Dalin Rowell felt that, despite its poor character animation and bizarre writing, the incorporation of a horror circus and real dinosaurs dancing on city streets would fascinate children's minds, and the character of Rex would appeal to young audiences looking for a supportive and very fun friend. Common Sense Media's Renee Schonfeld called it "clever enough, visually appealing enough, and brisk enough to make it satisfying". He praised the "engaging" child protagonists, voice acting, and parade scene, although felt it suffered from an "often tangled, overloaded story" with too many characters.

== See also ==
- List of films featuring dinosaurs
