= We're Back! A Dinosaur's Story (book) =

1987 children's book

- We're Back! A Dinosaur's Story cover
- Author: Hudson Talbott
- Illustrator: Hudson Talbott
- Cover artist: Hudson Talbott
- Genre: Fiction, children's literature
- Publisher: Crown
- Publication date: November 1987
- Publication place: United States
- Media type: Print (flatcover)
- Pages: 20
- Preceded by: Into the Woods
- Followed by: Going Hollywood! A Dinosaur's Dream

We're Back! A Dinosaur's Story is a 1987 children's book drawn and written by Hudson Talbott, and published by Crown. A Tyrannosaurus Rex named Rex is the main character and narrator. Other dinosaurs included in the book are a Triceratops, a Saurolophus, an Apatosaurus, a Stegosaurus, and a Deinonychus, with the only exception being the Pteranodon, a pterosaur.

A sequel book was later published, Going Hollywood! A Dinosaur's Dream and Your Pet Dinosaur: An Owner's Manual.

== Plot ==
One day, in the Cretaceous Period, as a Tyrannosaurus named Rex is about to devour a Thescelosaurus, he is captured by a flying saucer piloted by a small Troodon named Vorb. He recruits him and several other dinosaurs (including Woog the Triceratops, Pteri the Pteranodon, Jorbi the Saurolophus, Bigon the Apatosaurus, Spike the Stegosaurus, and Dwig the Deinonychus) he has found for a trial of a special "vitamin" he has developed which, upon feeding it to the dinosaurs, causes them to become sentient. Vorb takes them aboard his saucer and they travel to the present, dropping them off in New York City, which at that moment is celebrating the Macy's Thanksgiving Day Parade. The dinosaurs pretend to be inflatable balloons to sneak along with the parade, but Rex mistakes one of the real dinosaur balloons to be his Allosaurus friend Worgul. The ruse is broken as a result of him accidentally popping "Worgul" and the dinosaurs flee as the crowd panics in sight of them. The police come to capture the dinosaurs soon after, but the helpful curator of the American Museum of Natural History, Dr. Miriam Bleeb, takes the dinosaurs in, and hides them from the cops by having them pretend to be life-size model dinosaurs. This satisfies the police, who leave to search for the dinosaurs elsewhere, and the curator lets them stay for the night. She reads them a bedtime story about a trilobite who wanted to walk on land, while the dinosaurs watch out the window, unsure about their future.

== Film adaptation ==
The book was later adapted into an animated film of the same name in 1993, produced by Steven Spielberg's Amblimation animation studio and distributed by Universal Pictures.
