= Ralph Zondag =

Canadian–American animator

- Other name: Ralf Zondag
- Occupations: Animator, storyboard artist, director
- Years active: 1985–present

Ralph Zondag is a Canadian animator, storyboard artist, and director.

== Life and career ==
Zondag studied animation at Sheridan College, Ontario, Canada from 1983 to 1984.

He started his career at the Toronto-based Nelvana studio in working on projects like The Care Bears Movie (1985). He later joined Sullivan Bluth Studios in Ireland and worked as animation director on The Land Before Time (1988), in which he animated the characters Petrie and the Sharptooth, and All Dogs Go to Heaven (1989). He also directed television commercials while working at Sullivan Bluth. In 1993, he made his directorial debut for We're Back! A Dinosaur's Story based on the book of the same name, along with his brother Dick.

Zondag joined Walt Disney Feature Animation during the early 1990s and co-wrote Pocahontas in 1995. In 2000, he and Eric Leighton directed Dinosaur as a part of the Disney Computer Graphics Unit. Zondag was nominated for Annie Award for Outstanding Individual Achievement for Directing in an Animated Feature Production.

He worked on projects such as Rugrats Go Wild (2003), Home on the Range (2004), Balto III: Wings of Change (2004), Valiant (2005), and Curious George (2006). Zondag worked as storyboard artist on Ultimate Avengers 2, Flushed Away (2006), The Golden Compass (2007), and Kung Fu Panda (2008). He worked on the 3-D animated features Meet the Robinsons (2007) and Bolt (2008). Zondag also created concept art during the pre-production of Tangled (2010).

His most recent credits are the educational TV series Space Racers and the Christian-themed film The Star.

== Filmography ==
=== Animation department ===
- The Star (character designer) 2017
- Space Racers (TV Series) (storyboard supervisor - 6 episodes) 2016-2017
- NFL Rush Zone (TV Series) (storyboard artist - 4 episodes) 2013
- Superbook (TV Series) (revisions - 1 episode, 2013) (Revisions - 1 episode, 2013)
- Bolt (animator) 2008
- Curious George (animator: July Films) 2006
- Valiant (character developer) 2005
- Rugrats Go Wild (additional animator) 2003
- All Dogs Go to Heaven (directing animator) 1989
- The Land Before Time (directing animator) 1988
- An American Tail (animator) 1986
- Strawberry Shortcake Meets the Berrykins (TV movie) (animator) 1985
- Ewoks (character layout artist - 13 episodes) 1985
- Star Wars: Droids (character posing artist - 13 episodes) 1985
- The Care Bears Movie (animator) 1985

=== Art department ===
- Barbie: Dolphin Magic (storyboard artist) 2017
- Animal Crackers (storyboard artist) 2017
- Space Racers (TV Series) (storyboard artist/supervisor - 12 episodes, 2014–2018)
- Peter Rabbit (TV Series) (storyboards - 9 episodes) 2012-2013
- Dragons: Riders of Berk (TV Series) (storyboard artist - 3 episodes) 2012-2013
- Archer (TV Series) (storyboard artist - 13 episodes) 2011-2012
- The Little Mermaid: Ariel's Beginning (storyboard artist) 2008
- Ultimate Avengers II (storyboard artist) 2006
- The Adventures of Brer Rabbit (Video) (storyboard artist) 2006
- Bionicle 3: Web of Shadows (storyboard artist) 2005
- Father of the Pride (storyboard artist - 1 episode) 2004
- Mickey's Twice Upon a Christmas (storyboard artist) 2004
- Balto III: Wings of Change (storyboard artist) 2004
- Mickey, Donald, Goofy: The Three Musketeers (storyboard artist) 2004
- Clifford's Puppy Days (TV Series) (storyboard artist - 1 episode) 2004
- A Troll in Central Park (storyboard artist) 1994
- Rock-a-Doodle (storyboard artist) 1991

=== Director ===
- Dinosaur (2000)
- We're Back! A Dinosaur's Story (1993)

=== Miscellaneous crew ===
- Superbook (TV series) (revisions - 2 episodes, 2013 - 2014) (Revisions - 1 episode, 2013) 2013-2014
- Rock-a-Doodle (sequence director) 1991

=== Writer ===
- The Little Matchgirl (Short) (story development) 2006
- Home on the Range (additional story) 2004
- Dinosaur (story) 2000
- Pocahontas (story) 1995
