= Simon Wells =

English film director (born 1961)

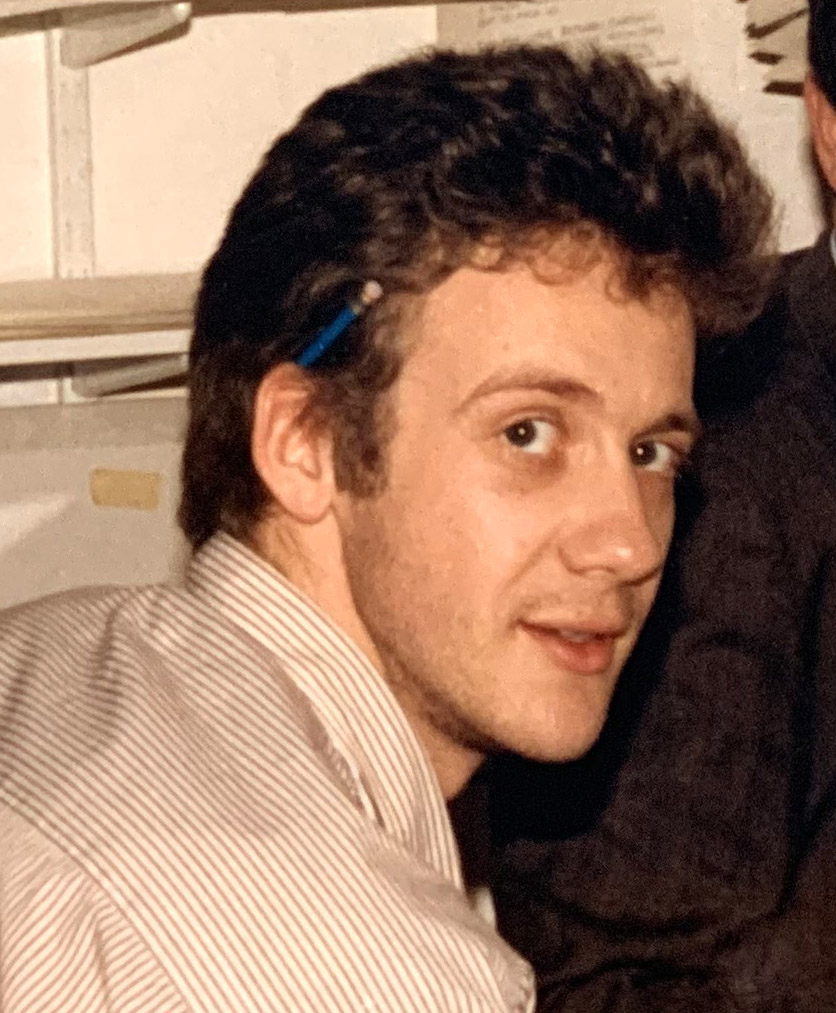
- Wells on the set of Who Framed Roger Rabbit in 1987
- Born: 19 October 1961 (age 63); Cambridge, Cambridgeshire, England
- Occupations: Film director; animator
- Years active: 1988–present
- Employers: Amblimation (1989–1995); DreamWorks Animation (1995–present)
- Spouse: Wendy Wells (m. 1988)
- Children: 2
- Relatives: H. G. Wells (great-grandfather)

Simon Finlay Wells (born 19 October 1961) is an English film director of animation and live-action films. He is the great-grandson of author H. G. Wells, and is best known for directing An American Tail: Fievel Goes West (1991), Balto (1995), and The Prince of Egypt (1998).

== Early life and education ==
Born in Cambridge, he attended The Perse School and De Montfort University where he studied audio-visual design. Upon graduating he found a job at Richard Williams's studio where he animated commercials and other projects. Wells later supervised the animation on Who Framed Roger Rabbit.

== Career ==
Wells began his film career by joining Richard Williams Animation, where he served as a supervising animator on Who Framed Roger Rabbit. After the closing of Richard Williams Animation, Wells became a member of Amblimation, a studio owned by Steven Spielberg, where he served as director on their only three films: An American Tail: Fievel Goes West, We're Back! A Dinosaur's Story and Balto. Wells was set to direct a sequel to Casper, but the project was cancelled.

After the closing of Amblimation, Wells joined DreamWorks where he worked as storyboard artist on many animated projects, and also directed The Prince of Egypt which was nominated for an Annie Award.

In 2002, Wells directed his first live-action film, a film adaptation of his great-grandfather's book The Time Machine.

Wells went back to DreamWorks Animation, where he continued as a story artist for films such as Spirit: Stallion of the Cimarron (2002), Shrek 2 (2004), Madagascar (2005) and Flushed Away (2006).

In 2011 he co-wrote and directed Mars Needs Moms using motion-capture technology during the filming.

== Filmography ==
Director

- An American Tail: Fievel Goes West (1991)
- We're Back! A Dinosaur's Story (1993)
- Balto (1995)
- The Prince of Egypt (1998)
- The Time Machine (2002)
- Mars Needs Moms (2011) (Also writer)

Story artist

- Spirit: Stallion of the Cimarron (2002)
- Sinbad: Legend of the Seven Seas (2003)
- Madagascar (2005)
- Over the Hedge (2006)
- Flushed Away (2006)
- Shrek the Third (2007)
- Kung Fu Panda (2008)
- The Croods (2013)
- Kung Fu Panda 3 (2016)
- The Lego Ninjago Movie (2017)
- The Croods: A New Age (2020)
- Puss in Boots: The Last Wish (2022)
- Ruby Gillman, Teenage Kraken (2023)
- Kung Fu Panda 4 (2024)

Additional story artist

- Antz (1998)
- The Road to El Dorado (2000)
- Chicken Run (2000)
- Shrek 2 (2004)
- Shark Tale (2004)
- Kung Fu Panda 2 (2011)
- How to Train Your Dragon: The Hidden World (2019)
- Ultraman: Rising (2024)

Other credits

Year	Title	Role
1988	Who Framed Roger Rabbit	supervising animator
1989	Back to the Future Part II	consultant: Future
1990	Back to the Future Part III	assistance/thanks
2001	Shrek	special thanks
2004	The Polar Express	digital visual concept consultant
2008	Kung Fu Panda	action sequence supervisor
