= List of TaleSpin episodes =

The following is an episode list for the Disney animated television series TaleSpin. The majority of the series and storylines are stand-alones and bear little significance in the order they are aired. The only recurrent themes are Baloo's drive to save money in order to repurchase his plane (the Sea Duck) and Rebecca's desire to make a profitable living. As with many animated series of the time, there was no formal conclusion to the series. A comic ran for a short period and was then discontinued as well.

Select episodes were first aired on The Disney Channel in the spring of 1990, as a preview for the series; these episodes' Disney Channel airdates are given separately.

== Episodes ==
No.	Title	Animation director(s)	Written by	Storyboard	Original release date
1 2 3 4	"Plunder & Lightning"	Robert Taylor, John Kimball, Larry Latham, Richard Trueblood and Bob Zamboni	Alan Burnett, Len Uhley and Mark Zaslove	Viki Anderson, Larry Eikleberry, Sharon Forward, Warren Greenwood, Bob Kline, John Norton, Frank Paur, David Schwartz, Lonnie Thompson, Hank Tucker, Wendell Washer and Roy Wilson	September 7, 1990
In the series premiere, Baloo, an air cargo pilot, meets Kit Cloudkicker, a 12-year-old orphan, and takes him on as his navigator. He also loses his business to Rebecca Cunningham, a business major who becomes his boss. Meanwhile, Don Karnage, a notorious air pirate, uses a special gem stolen from Shere Khan's company, Khan Industries, to power a lightning gun and threaten Cape Suzette. The episode, which originally aired as a two-hour film, re-aired in four parts from November 19 through November 22. Animation Production by: Walt Disney Animation (France) S.A. (2x), Walt Disney Animation (Japan) Inc., Sun Woo Animation; Additional Production Facility: Hanho Heung-Up Co., Ltd.
5	"From Here to Machinery"	John Kimball	Len Uhley	Sharon Forward and John Norton	September 10, 1990
Baloo loses a race to a robot pilot funded by one of Shere Khan's scientists, putting himself and several other cargo pilots in Cape Suzette out of work. Don Karnage takes advantage of the robot pilot's inability to evade trouble, and it is up to Baloo to save the day. Animation: Sun Woo
6	"It Came from Beneath the Sea Duck"	Robert Taylor, John Kimball, Rick Leon and Bob Zamboni	Don Rosa	Ryan Anthony, Warren Greenwood and Roy Wilson	September 11, 1990
Kit volunteers to babysit Molly while Baloo and Rebecca go shopping. The babysitting is anything but routine as Kit and Molly deal with air pirates and a giant squid. Animation: HANHO HEUNG-UP CO., LTD
7	"Time Waits for No Bear"	Terence Harrison, John Kimball, Rick Leon, Bob Zamboni and Robert Taylor	Jeremy Cushner and Karl Geurs	Viki Anderson, Larry Eikleberry, John Norton, Ryan Anthony, Vic Cook and Sharon Forward	September 12, 1990
When Baloo is late one too many times with his deliveries, Rebecca makes him fly a guided tour, going past certain checkpoints at designated times. However, Baloo hears of a stolen crown and concocts a scheme to get the crown back while Wildcat flies the tour.
8	"Mommy for a Day"	Terence Harrison and John Kimball	Libby Hinson	Kurt Anderson and Hank Tucker	September 13, 1990
Molly becomes a surrogate mother to a flying creature that becomes large when it gets wet and small when it dries. This becomes more difficult when she has to protect the creature from the bloodthirsty poacher MacKnee.
9	"I Only Have Ice for You"	Bob Zamboni, Terence Harrison and Robert Taylor	Don Rosa	Hank Tucker and Roy Wilson	September 14, 1990
Rebecca takes over flying the Sea Duck after Baloo's license is temporarily suspended while trying to evade air pirates. The move causes havoc as Higher for Hire attempts to deliver a block of ice to a wealthy desert prince.
10	"Molly Coddled"	Jamie Mitchell	Alan Burnett and Eric Lewald	Yi-Chih Chen, Rich Chidlaw and Robert Souza	September 17, 1990
Covington, a notorious jewel thief, hides a valuable item in the Sea Duck. When he tries to retrieve it, he discovers that Baloo and Kit have cleaned out the plane and Molly has added the item to her doll collection.
11	"Polly Wants a Treasure"	Jamie Mitchell	Carter Crocker and Bruce Talkington	Holly Forsyth and George Goode	September 18, 1990
Kit befriends a parrot, Ignatz, who claims to know about some buried treasure. Baloo meanwhile is upset when Rebecca charges him for the value of a shipment of expensive crystal, which was actually broken by air pirates.
12	"Vowel Play"	Ed Ghertner	Dean Stefan	Holly Forsyth, David Smith, Vincent Trippetti and Jamie Mitchell	September 19, 1990
Baloo's bad spelling hampers Rebecca's attempt to go into the skywriting business. Meanwhile, a notorious criminal uses the skywriting to attempt to send coded messages to his henchmen and hold Cape Suzette for ransom. Animation Production by: Walt Disney Animation (Japan) Inc. Additional Production Facility: Tama Production Co., Ltd
13	"The Idol Rich"	Jamie Mitchell	Carter Crocker, Libby Hinson and Bruce Talkington	Bob Cline and Yi-Chih Chen	September 20, 1990
Baloo competes with Colonel Spigot to acquire a valuable idol, but uses brains over brawn to get the idol back when Spigot takes the idol from him. Animation Production by: Sun Woo Animation
14	"Stormy Weather"	Ed Ghertner	Jan Strnad	Jan Green, Swinton Scott and David Smith	September 21, 1990
After Kit gets into an argument with Baloo about taking unnecessary risks, he runs away to join an air circus led by Daring Dan Dawson. However, Dawson makes Kit perform more dangerous and wilder stunts, and it is up to Baloo to rescue his navigator. Animation Production by: Hanho Heung-Up Co., Ltd., Walt Disney Animation Japan, Inc.
15	"Bearly Alive"	Robert Taylor	Ken Koonce, Dean Stefan and David Wiemers	Warren Greenwood and Bob Kline	September 24, 1990
Rebecca misinterprets a phone call as news that Baloo is dying. When Baloo finds out, he decides to fly to the Bearmuda Trapezoid, from which no pilot has ever returned. Animation Production by: Wang Film Productions Co., Ltd.
16	"Her Chance to Dream"	Ed Ghertner	Libby Hinson	Kurt Anderson and David Smith	September 25, 1990
When a debonair ghost ship captain sweeps Rebecca off her feet, she enjoys what she thinks is a dream. When Baloo and Louie decide to exorcise the ghost, Rebecca is forced to choose between her dream and her daughter. Animation Production by: Sun Woo Animation
17	"All's Whale That Ends Whale"	Jamie Mitchell	Kurt Anderson and David Smith	Ryan Anthony, Rich Chidlaw and George Goode	September 26, 1990
Baloo and Kit rescue a mistreated whale from a circus and give him his freedom. Animation Production by: Walt Disney Animation (Japan) Inc. Additional Production Facility: Jade Animation Productions Limited
18	"The Golden Sprocket of Friendship"	Larry Latham	Steve Sustarsic	Eduardo Olivares, Frank Paur and David Schwartz	September 27, 1990
Colonel Spigot is charged with presenting a golden sprocket as a gift to the Mayor of Cape Suzette, but Trader Moe wants to steal the sprocket, and it is up to Kit and Baloo to stop him and help Spigot. Animation Production by: Walt Disney Animation (Japan) Inc. Additional Production Facility: Tama Production Co., Ltd
19	"For a Fuel Dollars More"	Robert Taylor	Chuck Tately	Hank Tucker and Roy Wilson	September 28, 1990
Rebecca starts a midair refueling station, which is a hit with the pilots and boosts Higher for Hire's business. Trouble is, it significantly lowers business for Louie, who starts his own rival station to compete, and Baloo and Kit are caught in the middle. Animation Production by: Walt Disney Animation Japan, Inc., Hanho Heung-Up Co., Ltd.
20 21	"A Bad Reflection on You: Parts 1 and 2"	Robert Taylor and Jamie Mitchell	Chuck Tately and Jymn Magon	Holly Forsyth and George Goode	October 1, 1990 - October 2, 1990
Baloo gets an award from Shere Khan for being "the best pilot in the world", but he lets that go to his head when he is selected for the Master Run, a dangerous route from which none of Khan's pilots that have flown it have returned. When they fly the Master Run, Baloo and Kit learn who is really behind the disappearances, as well as how the trick is done (performed with mirrors - literally). "A Bad Reflection on You" featured the voices of both Alan Roberts and R.J. Williams as Kit. Animation Production by: Sunwoo Animation
22	"On a Wing and a Bear"	Robert Taylor	Ken Koonce and David Weimers	Viki Anderson, Larry Eikleberry, Hank Tucker and Roy Wilson	October 3, 1990
Baloo inadvertently lets his pilot's license expire, but has trouble renewing it when his examiner rattles him by requiring him to perform his actions alphabetically. He then learns that Don Karnage has teamed up with Shere Khan to create an oil shortage in Cape Suzette. Animation Production by: Wang Film Productions Co., Ltd.
23	"A Star Is Torn"	Larry Latham	Dev Ross	Lonnie Thompson and Wendell Washer	October 4, 1990
Baloo is starstruck when he meets film star Kitten Kaboodle, and immediately signs on as her stunt pilot. Concerned for Baloo as his friend, Rebecca learns that the "accidents" on Kitten's set are no accidents. Animation Production by: Walt Disney Animation (Japan) Inc. Additional Production Facility: Hanho Heung-Up Co., Ltd
24	"A Touch of Glass"	Jamie Mitchell and Robert Taylor	Libby Hinson	Rich Chidlaw, Jim Mitchell and John Norton	October 5, 1990
Wanting to cater to only the upper class, Rebecca puts up the Sea Duck as collateral insurance for what appears to be a valuable jewel shipment. However, Baloo loses the shipment -- and the Sea Duck -- to what turn out to be two con artists posing as a wealthy couple. Animation Production by: Sun Woo Animation
25	"The Bigger They Are, the Louder They Oink"	Larry Latham	Jeremy Cushner	Frank Paur and David Schwartz	October 8, 1990
Baloo is upset when Rebecca gets a truffle-hunting pig instead of a new pontoon for the Sea Duck. Refusing to believe that her idea may not be good, Rebecca gets herself and the pig enslaved by pygmies, and it is up to Kit and Baloo to save her. Animation Production by: Wang Film Productions Co., Ltd.
26	"A Spy in the Ointment"	Jamie Mitchell	Mark Zaslove	Kurt Anderson, Rob LaDuca and Keith Tucker	October 9, 1990
Rebecca chides Baloo over being too gullible, but herself ends up being the gullible one when she helps a "spy" deliver a package. Animation Production by: Walt Disney Animation (Japan) Inc. Additional Production Facility: Hanho Heung-Up Co., Ltd.
27	"The Balooest of the Bluebloods"	Ed Ghertner	Libby Hinson	Kurt Anderson, Keith Tucker and Chris Rutkowski	October 15, 1990
Baloo learns he's actually a long-lost baron, but when he goes to the mansion that he has supposedly inherited, there are several attempts on his life. Animation Production by: Walt Disney Animation (Japan) Inc., Hanho Heung-Up Co., Ltd
28	"A Baloo Switcheroo"	Robert Taylor	Alan Burnett, Ken Koonce and David Wiemers	Viki Anderson and Roy Wilson	October 16, 1990
In a plot reminiscent of Freaky Friday, a magical idol switches Baloo with Kit and Rebecca with Don Karnage. They are then involved in a race against time to get back to normal; if they fail, by sunrise they will remain like this forever. Animation: Walt Disney Japan
29	"Whistlestop Jackson, Legend"	Jamie Mitchell	Carter Crocker	Holly Forsyth and George Goode	October 22, 1990
Legendary hero Whistlestop Jackson pays a visit to Cape Suzette and volunteers to do a special cargo run for Higher for Hire, but Shere Khan, his longtime rival, has other plans. Animation: Sun Woo
30	"Double or Nothing"	Ed Ghertner and Larry Latham	Bruce Morris	Jan Green, Warren Greenwood and Keith Tucker	October 24, 1990
When Baloo learns that Kit's life savings will pay for him to replace his favorite record, he offers to double Kit's money if Kit lets him "invest" it. Animation: Walt Disney Japan
31	"Feminine Air"	Jamie Mitchell	Julia Lewald and Bruce Talkington	Vic Cook and Robert Souza	October 30, 1990
Higher for Hire's business is suffering because its boss is female. Baloo decides to enter an air scavenger hunt, but only an all-female aviation club will sponsor Higher for Hire, so he disguises himself as a lady to do so. Animation: Sun Woo
32	"Last Horizons"	Larry Latham	Jeremy Cushner, Dev Ross and Chuck Tately	Sharon Forward, Larry Houston and John Norton	November 1, 1990
Baloo finds the legendary "Panda-La", a mystical place, where he is warmly received. The reception, however, turns out to be a ruse, as Panda-La's inhabitants decide to attack Cape Suzette. Animation: Sun Woo
33	"Flight of the Snow Duck"	Robert Taylor	Steve Roberts	Roy Wilson and Viki Anderson	November 5, 1990
When Wildcat babysits Molly, she convinces him to take her to Thembria to see snow. Once there, however, they have fun, which gets them imprisoned because having fun is illegal in Thembria. Animation: Walt Disney Japan
34	"Save the Tiger"	Larry Latham	Stephen Sustarsic	Andrew Austin, Sharon Forward, Larry Latham, John Norton, and David Schwartz	November 7, 1990
When Baloo saves Shere Khan's life, Khan offers Baloo anything he wants, a decision he quickly regrets when Baloo takes advantage of it. Animation: Walt Disney Japan
35	"The Old Man and the Sea Duck"	Ed Ghertner	Libby Hinson	Jan Green, David Smith and Keith Tucker	November 8, 1990
Baloo suffers amnesia after he hits his head while taking a shortcut during a cargo run. He then lands on an island where an old pilot, Joe McGee, helps him remember how to fly. Animation: Wang
36	"War of the Weirds"	Ed Ghertner, Larry Latham and Jamie Mitchell	Len Uhley	Jan Green and Keith Tucker	November 13, 1990
Rebecca overworks Baloo to the point where he lies to her to get some time off. The lie escalates into a Martian invasion, which quickly becomes complicated when a trigger-happy colonel overhears the conversation over the radio. Animation: Sun Woo
37	"Captains Outrageous"	Ed Ghertner	Jan Strnad	Kurt Anderson, Rob LaDuca and Chris Rutkowski	November 15, 1990
Kit introduces his friend, accident-prone Oscar Vandersnoot, to his club, the Jungle Aces, but Oscar needs an adventure to join. When Kit decides to get Oscar his adventure, he gets more than what he bargained for when Don Karnage kidnaps Oscar for ransom. Animation: Walt Disney Japan
38	"The Time Bandit"	Robert Taylor	Ken Koonce and David Weimers	Viki Anderson, Ryan Anthony, Larry Eikleberry and Bob Kline	November 23, 1990
Baloo makes Rebecca think it is one day later than it actually is so he can get paid early. That one day, however, turns out to be significant as Rebecca then claims that Baloo missed important deliveries to Myopia and Thembria, and goes along to apologize on his behalf. The conflict quickly escalates, and only the arrival of Cleanser's comet can save Rebecca from peril. Animation: Walt Disney France
39 40	"For Whom the Bell Klangs: Parts 1 and 2"	Robert Taylor and Jamie Mitchell	Mark Zaslove	Viki Anderson, Holly Forsyth, George Goode, Hank Tucker and Roy Wilson	November 27, 1990 - November 28, 1990
Baloo and Louie go on vacation and get involved with archaeologist Katie Dodd, who is searching for the lost city of Tinabula. Thadeos E. Klang, a mysterious villain, is also looking for the city, but has his own plans for it. Animation: Sun Woo
41	"Citizen Khan"	Jamie Mitchell	Eric Lewald	Ryan Anthony, John Dorman and Dan Fausett	December 3, 1990
Baloo and company visit one of Shere Khan's mining operations, which is overseen by a sheriff who mistreats the workers. When the workers mistake Wildcat for Khan, they kidnap him, but Khan learns of "his" abduction and goes to investigate. Animation: Sun Woo
42	"Gruel and Unusual Punishment"	Robert Taylor	Michael Edens	Viki Anderson, Jill Colbert Trousdale, Paulette King, Hank Tucker and Roy Wilson	December 4, 1990
To lose weight for the Pilot's Ball, Baloo goes to what he thinks is a weight loss camp, but the camp turns out to be a Thembrian prison. Animation: Walt Disney Japan
43	"Jolly Molly Christmas"	Ed Ghertner and James T. Walker	Libby Hinson	Kurt Anderson, David Smith and Jill Colbert Trousdale	December 20, 1990
When Baloo learns that all that Molly wants for Christmas is for it to snow for her mom, he takes Kit and Rebecca on a mission to make Molly's wish come true. Animation: Wang
44	"My Fair Baloo"	Ed Ghertner	Jeffrey Scott	Kurt Anderson, Rob LaDuca, Chris Rutkowski and Jill Colbert Trousdale	January 7, 1991
Rebecca decides to shmooze with the upper class by booking a reservation on the "Spruce Moose". Trouble is, Baloo's crude, unrefined behavior causes problems, but he then has to save the day when the Spruce Moose is hijacked and then crashes. Animation: Sun Woo
45	"Waiders of the Wost Tweasure"	Jamie Mitchell	Mark Edward Edens and Michael Edens	Victor Cook, John Norton and Robert Souza	January 9, 1991
When Baloo delivers a package to Walla Walla Bing Bang, he runs into an old rival, Airplane Jane, and a battle for Walla Walla Bing Bang's throne between Princess Grace and her long lost cousin Prince Rudolf. Animation: Wang
46	"Flight School Confidential"	Jamie Mitchell	Martin Donoff	Victor Cook and Robert Souza	January 10, 1991
When Kit, who yearns to be a pilot even though he's too young, hears that the flying age has been lowered to twelve in Thembria, he goes there... only to discover that the whole thing is just a ruse and the kids won't actually be flying. Animation: Sun Woo
47	"Bringing Down Babyface"	Jamie Mitchell	Ellen Svaco and Colleen Taber	Ryan Anthony, Rich Chidlaw and George Goode	January 17, 1991
A case of mistaken identity causes what would have been a routine prisoner transport to become a serious headache for Baloo as he is pursued by both gangsters and the cops. Animation: Sun Woo
48	"Jumping the Guns"	Larry Latham	Julia Lewald and Steve Roberts	John Norton and Wendell Washer	January 21, 1991
When a mishap during a delivery knocks out the sentries who man Cape Suzette's cliff guns, Baloo and an old codger named Barney O' Turret, who hasn't fired the guns in years, are forced to man the guns to stop Don Karnage and his gang from attacking. Animation: Walt Disney Japan
49	"In Search of Ancient Blunders"	Robert Taylor	Steve Roberts	Larry Eikleberry and Roy Wilson	January 30, 1991
When Baloo and Wildcat deliver an Egyptian tablet to Myra, an archaeologist in Aridia who plans to open her own Museum of Ancient History, the delivery becomes anything but routine as they look for a lost treasure of King Utmost and try to evade air pirates, traps and an ancient treasure guardian. Animation: Walt Disney Japan
50	"Louie's Last Stand"	Larry Latham	Chuck Tately	Sharon Forward, Frank Paur and Lonnie Thompson	January 31, 1991
An overzealous Douglas Benson, one of Shere Khan's employees, forges Khan's signature to acquire several of Khan's assets to forcibly take over Louie's. Animation: Sun Woo
51	"Sheepskin Deep"	Larry Latham	Dean Stefan	Michael Fallows and John Flagg	February 4, 1991
Desperate to attend a reunion for a grade school (from which he never graduated), Baloo goes back to school to earn his degree in time for the reunion. Animation: Wang
52	"Pizza Pie in the Sky"	Robert Taylor	Mark Edward Edens and Michael Edens	Roman Arambula, Larry Eikleberry, Jim Willoughby and Roy Wilson	February 5, 1991
Rebecca leaves Baloo and Kit in charge when she attends a Better Business Boot Camp. Baloo takes advantage of this to team up with Louie to start their own pizza delivery business, but things quickly spiral out of control as they get the attention of the Health Department. Animation: Walt Disney France
53	"Baloo Thunder"	James T. Walker	Stephen Sustarsic	Liz Chapman, Jan Green and David Schwartz	February 6, 1991
When Professor Buzz, who works in Shere Khan's research and development section, is framed for stealing a top secret research project, Baloo and Kit work to clear Buzz's name and find out who the real culprit is. Animation: Sun Woo
54	"Bullethead Baloo"	Jamie Mitchell	Steve Roberts	Victor Cook, Holly Forsyth and Robert Souza	February 7, 1991
When Baloo learns that he is "yesterday's news" and the new hot item is a character called "Bullethead", Baloo tries to regain the kids' respect by posing as Bullethead. Meanwhile, Shere Khan deals with a crazed robotics scientist and his Mechanical Electric Laborer (MEL) robot. Animation: Walt Disney Japan
55	"Destiny Rides Again"	Robert Taylor	Cathryn Perdue	Viki Anderson, Paulette King, Roy Shishido and Roy Wilson	February 8, 1991
Baloo and Kit find themselves flirting with destiny as they encounter an Idol of Doom and El Gato, a villain who wants the idol for himself.
56	"Mach One for the Gipper"	Robert Taylor	Cathryn Perdue	Larry Eikleberry, Don Manuel and Roy Shishido	February 11, 1991
After Baloo inadvertently picks up a package belonging to another pilot, Ace London, Ace blames Baloo for the mix-up and Baloo has to clear his name while also dodging air pirates. Animation: Wang
57	"Stuck on You"	Robert Taylor	Len Uhley	Jim Willoughby and Roy Wilson	February 12, 1991
Baloo finds himself literally stuck to Don Karnage after an accident with a 55 gallon drum of glue. They race to return to get the glue removed, but have to dodge Rebecca and the other air pirates along the way.
58	"The Sound and the Furry"	Jamie Mitchell	Julia Lewald	Rich Chidlaw, Holly Forsyth, George Goode and David Prince	February 13, 1991
Wildcat's love of animals shows itself when he befriends several small, furry creatures. The animals, however, are wearing radio control collars, which when activated causes them to take anything mechanical apart, especially airplanes.
59	"The Road to Macadamia"	Larry Latham	Len Uhley	Yi-Chi Chen, Sharon Forward and John Norton	February 20, 1991
When Baloo and Louie deliver a shipment to the kingdom of Macadamia, they are in for more than they bargained for with the kingdom's evil vizier. Meanwhile, they also fall for the king's attractive daughter.
60	"The Ransom of Red Chimp"	Larry Latham	Libby Hinson	John Norton and Wendell Washer	February 21, 1991
Louie's aunt, Aunt Louise, visits him and turns out to be more than a handful as she is just as much of a party animal as her nephew. She even goes after Don Karnage, who tries to kidnap her.
61	"Your Baloo's in the Mail"	James T. Walker	Jeremy Cushner	James McLean, David Smith and Jill Colbert Trousdale	February 22, 1991
When Rebecca wins a contest, she has Baloo mail the winning ticket for her. Unfortunately, Baloo spends most of the money on food rather than postage, and now has to help speed the mail along so it can get delivered in time.
62	"Paradise Lost"	Larry Latham	Jeffrey Scott	Yi-Chi Chen, Sharon Forward, Chris Rutkowski and Wendell Washer	February 25, 1991
Baloo and Wildcat take an explorer to an island that looks deserted but restores prehistoric life when a magical river runs through it.
63	"The Incredible Shrinking Molly"	James T. Walker	Chuck Tately	Kurt Anderson, James McLean and Chris Rutkowski	April 8, 1991
Molly finds herself caught in a mad scientist's lab and inadvertently gets herself shrunk. It is up to Baloo, Rebecca and Kit to go to the scientist's lab and find a way to get Molly un-shrunk.
64	"Bygones"	James T. Walker	Stephen Sustarsic	Kathleen Carr, Jan Green and David Schwartz	May 3, 1991
When Baloo meets a pilot who claims he is Rick Sky, who had vanished some twenty years ago, Sky takes the Sea Duck to finish a mission he had failed to complete. Baloo has to evade air pirates, get the Sea Duck back, and find out who this mysterious pilot really is.
65	"Flying Dupes"	Jamie Mitchell	Martin Donoff	Ryan Anthony, Dale Schott and David Thrasher	August 8, 1991
In the series finale, Baloo is asked to deliver a package, which is actually a bomb, to the Thembrian High Marshal. Meanwhile, Colonel Spigot is instructed to fly a plane but does not know how, and Baloo offers to teach him if he will complete the delivery for him. Note: This episode was only shown once before it was banned from the lineup, most likely due to its terrorist theme.
