= Plunder & Lightning =

1990 film directed by Larry Latham

- Genre: Action; Adventure; Comedy drama Dieselpunk; Science fiction Crime
- Written by: Alan Burnett; Len Uhley; Mark Zaslove
- Directed by: Larry Latham; Robert Taylor
- Starring: Ed Gilbert; R. J. Williams; Sally Struthers; Janna Michaels; Pat Fraley; Tony Jay; Jim Cummings
- Theme music composer: Christopher L. Stone
- Country of origin: United States
- Original language: English

Production
- Producers: Larry Latham; Robert Taylor
- Editors: Rich Harrison; Cecil E. Broughton
- Running time: 91 minutes
- Production company: Walt Disney Television Animation

Original release
- Network: Syndicated
- Release: September 7, 1990

Plunder & Lightning is an animated television film, originally broadcast on September 7, 1990, that makes up the first four episodes of the Disney animated series TaleSpin. The film was broadcast in syndication on various local and regional channels at different times from Friday, September 7 through Sunday, September 9, 1990. In 1991, the film was the sole nominee for an Emmy Award in the category of Outstanding Animated Program (For Programming More Than One Hour). After its original airing, the film (which serves as the pilot episode of the TaleSpin series) was split up into four parts which were treated as episodes of the series itself, but with severe edits. This four-part version first aired from Monday, November 19 through Thursday, November 22, 1990 (airing one part per day for four days).

== Plot ==
=== Part 1 ===
The series opens with Don Karnage and his band of air pirates hijacking and boarding a plane owned by Shere Khan to steal a box containing something that the pirates want. However, after Karnage and his men return with the box to their mothership, the Iron Vulture, a young bear-cub named Kit Cloudkicker steals the box and then leads the pirates through a chase sequence that results in him jumping off the ship and cloud-surfing out of the area with his trusty airfoil, hitching a ride over to a tavern owned by Louie, wherein he hides the box. Karnage and his men bust in, and Kit annoys them some more before escaping and following customer Baloo, who allows him to ride in his cargo plane, which he has named the Sea Duck. The air pirates give chase, with Baloo not understanding why they are after him, but he manages to elude them by flying to the city of Cape Suzette, where the air pirates cannot enter because the people working the cliff guns (which are anti-aircraft artillery pieces) keep shooting at them.

Having eluded the pirates, Baloo takes Kit to his company headquarters building (a shack equipped with a dock) for his air cargo business called "Baloo's Air Service", which is in trouble because he never bothers to pay his overdue bills. Baloo believes in only working when he feels he has to, and he considers making Kit his navigator. Kit explains that he has to get back to Louie's, but Baloo is not in the mood to go back to the bar so soon. Then a man from the Cape Suzette National Bank shows up to tell Baloo that since he is so far behind on his bills, his plane is going to be repossessed. Baloo is desperate for a way to prevent that, so he accepts Kit's idea of taking a $3,000 job, promising that he will take him to Louie's the next day if he helps him. However, the job he takes is a zoo delivery of gorilla-birds, large ostrich-like birds that are extremely hard to control. As they are struggling to deliver the gorilla-birds, the air pirates attack them again, this time causing Baloo to come in for a rough landing. At this point, Baloo realizes the pirates are after Kit and demands to know what the pirates want with him, but Kit reacts by storming off. Then Baloo discovers that the gorilla-birds have escaped and ran off.

Kit goes hacking through the jungle, only to be captured by Karnage, who ties him upside-down to a tree, demanding to know where the box is. Baloo has, in the meantime, gone looking for the gorilla-birds, and just when he has caught them all, he overhears Karnage tormenting Kit. To rescue him, he reluctantly lets the gorilla-birds loose and has them distract the pirates while he saves Kit. They make their way over a pack of alligators to get back to the Sea Duck and take off. As they fly off, Kit admits that he has hidden a large jewel at Louie's, and Baloo realizes that with a jewel like that, he could buy back the Sea Duck.

=== Part 2 ===
The next morning, Baloo and Kit meet their service's new owner, Rebecca Cunningham, who says she is going to turn this failing business into a real moneymaker. Rebecca says that Baloo will have to pay her $50,000 to reclaim the Sea Duck, but until then, he is her staff pilot. Baloo reluctantly agrees to this, because he can get to Louie's this way. When the business's mechanic Wildcat demonstrates his mechanical skills, Rebecca is impressed and remarks that at least something about this business works. Afterwards, Rebecca has the business's name changed to "Higher for Hire" (because she thinks it sounds cuter), makes Baloo and Kit wear silly-looking uniforms, and has the Sea Duck covered in a clownish paint job. She then sends Baloo and Kit to go deliver mangos, but no sooner do they get out of her sight, they ditch their uniforms and try to head off for Louie's. However, her daughter Molly has stowed away, and she is willing to tell her mother about their plan to go to Louie's if they do not allow her to come along. Thus they go ahead and bring Molly with them to Louie's.

Once there, Baloo and Kit find the jewel, but after Louie examines it he tells them that it is not a real jewel, and therefore it is worthless. When Kit mentions that Don Karnage had stolen it from Shere Khan, Baloo takes another look at it, only to have it shock him, making him decide that the jewel might be valuable after all. Just as they are leaving, the air pirates come back to attack. After a lengthy chase sequence, Baloo and Kit manage to throw the pirates off course by dumping the mangos on them. When they return to Higher for Hire, Rebecca is furious that they jettisoned the cargo and does not believe that it was because they were attacked by pirates until Molly defends them and admits that she sneaked onto the plane.

The next morning, before paying a visit to Khan Industries, Baloo and Kit hide the jewel in Molly's doll, Lucy, figuring that it would be wiser to find out how much Shere Khan is willing to pay for its return before they actually return it. After Baloo and Kit arrive at Khan's office, Khan explains to them that the stone is actually an electrical alloy developed by his scientists, and he is offering $100,000 for its return. Meanwhile, unbeknownst to Baloo and Kit, Don Karnage sneaks into Higher for Hire accompanied by Dumptruck and Mad Dog, looking for Baloo's plane. When Baloo and Kit return to Higher for Hire, they find that the pirates have ransacked the place and have kidnapped Rebecca and Molly, leaving behind a ransom note demanding that they be given the stone.

=== Part 3 ===
Kit feels that it is his own fault for the kidnapping, and as he helps Baloo find his way to Pirate Island, he confesses the story of his past. Until recently, he was an air pirate himself, but after about a year with Karnage and his men, he got sick of it and rebelled against them by taking the electrical stone and fleeing from them. Baloo sympathizes for him. While that is going on, Karnage and his men hijack another one of Shere Khan's planes, but they only steal seemingly worthless and useless items.

As Baloo and Kit land in the volcanic Pirate Island, Rebecca seduces the prison guard into letting them out by saying she will give him the deed of ownership of the Sea Duck if he promises to let them go free. The guard agrees to this, but just as he gets the keys, Baloo knocks him out and takes the deed, then lets Rebecca and Molly out. Just then, Karnage and his men return, and Baloo and company are forced to hide from the pirates' sight. Upon his return, Karnage reveals the master weapon he has been working on building using the junk they have stolen – a lightning gun, with which, he says, they will use to plunder Cape Suzette. He then sings a catchy song about what it means to be air pirates, during which Baloo and company try to sneak past disguised as other pirates, only to have Baloo foolishly try to prolong the song, blowing their cover in the process. To cover their escape, Kit pretends to rejoin the pirates and gives them the stone, but his acting angers Baloo, who believes it to be true. Baloo, Rebecca, and Molly make their escape not knowing that Kit was faking his betrayal, but the pirates are right behind. With the pirate fighters unshakable, Baloo turns on an overdrive function in the Sea Duck that allows them to get away very fast.

Upon returning to Cape Suzette, they are suddenly snatched by Shere Khan's men, who bring them to Khan himself who is anxious to recover his stone. Rebecca has no clue about what the stone is, so Khan has his scientist Dr. Debolt explain it: The "stone" is a "sub-electron amplifier", a one-of-a-kind creation that can generate limitless electrical energy and is powerful enough to run Khan's entire corporation. Khan chastises Baloo for not retrieving the stone as promised, and Baloo responds by complaining about everyone who is in the room with him. Back at Higher for Hire, Baloo packs his bags into the Sea Duck, which he buys back from Rebecca by paying her with a bag of gold dust that he had taken from the pirates earlier. Rebecca and Molly, though, do not want him to leave, partly because they do not believe that Kit has really gone bad.

=== Part 4 ===
Karnage and his pirates load the lightning gun onto the Iron Vulture and make their way towards Cape Suzette. In the city, Rebecca goes looking for new cargo pilots and planes. In Khan's office tower, Dr. Debolt informs Khan of the possibility that Karnage has created a lightning gun, but Khan does not believe it until he sees and hears an explosion coming from the cliff guns. He calls up the air field to combat this menace, but they are no match for the machine.

On board the Iron Vulture, Karnage announces to the citizens that he and his men are now going to plunder the city. However, Kit snatches the stone and runs off with it, taking refuge in a radio room. There, he calls a Mayday to nearby pilots to let Baloo know what is happening to the city and that he never really double-crossed Baloo. Over at Louie's, Baloo is enjoying himself when a pilot runs in telling him that he has got a message from "Little Britches". When Baloo hears Kit's message over Louie's transmission radio, he realizes he was wrong and that Kit never betrayed him, so he jumps back into the Sea Duck and activates the plane's overdrive again in order to arrive in Cape Suzette in time to rescue Kit.

Back on board the Iron Vulture, Kit tries to escape on his airfoil again, only to be snatched up by Dumptruck and have his airfoil broken by Karnage. Karnage, furious that Kit lied to him and continues to insult him, orders Dumptruck to drop Kit out of the ship to his death, but Baloo comes to the rescue just in time, burning out his overdrive in the process. They hide under a bridge in order to deter Karnage from looking for them. Afterwards, Baloo radios Higher for Hire to say that they are coming back. In spite of Baloo's suggestions, Rebecca refuses to leave the city, and then states that she knows how to combat Karnage's lightning gun - coat the Sea Duck with an armor of rubber materials. After doing this, she joins Baloo and Kit for the ride, because they have armored the plane with her tires. When Karnage hears Baloo and Kit taunting him on his radio, he orders his men to blow them up, but just as specified, the rubberized Sea Duck is unaffected by the lightning gun. Karnage tries sending his men out in their fighter-planes to chase the Sea Duck, but they all end up getting wrecked along the way. Baloo then reluctantly rams the Sea Duck right into the lightning gun, sending it, and the stone that powers it, crashing into the bay where it explodes due to contact with water, creating a tsunami. With the pirates' primary weapon destroyed, reinforcements of Khan's air force attack them which forces them to retreat from Cape Suzette. Baloo and company wash up on shore and survive, but the Sea Duck is practically destroyed.

A week later, the Sea Duck is repaired, but since Rebecca paid for its repairs, she owns it again, so now Baloo is again stuck as her staff pilot. This time, however, he accepts the job with less reluctance than before, saying it is only until he is able to buy it back again. The whole group takes an enjoyable flight through the skies in the restored Sea Duck, celebrating their new lives together.

== Cast ==
- Ed Gilbert as Baloo
- R. J. Williams as Kit Cloudkicker
- Sally Struthers as Rebecca Cunningham
- Janna Michaels as Molly Cunningham
- Pat Fraley as Wildcat
- Tony Jay as Shere Khan
- Jim Cummings as Don Karnage and Louie
- Charlie Adler as Mad Dog
- Chuck McCann as Dumptruck and Gibber
- Rob Paulsen as Ratchet and Dr. DeBolt
- Frank Welker as additional voices

== Edits ==
When the film was broadcast in four parts for reruns in 1990, several short scenes were cut for time. Like with the Darkwing Duck pilot episode Darkly Dawns the Duck, these scenes were not restored when the pilot was released on the TaleSpin: Volume 1 DVD set on August 29, 2006. These edited scenes do appear in the four-issue comic book adaptation. Some scenes were altered rather than cut, and others were not in the TV-movie version but were added to the four-part version.

When TaleSpin began reruns on The Disney Channel in 1995, Plunder & Lightning experienced even more cut scenes which remained absent during its reruns on The Disney Channel and Toon Disney, but unlike the earlier cuts, these scenes were restored in the TaleSpin: Volume 1 DVD release.

== Comic book adaptation ==
Plunder & Lightning was adapted into a four-issue limited series comic called "Take Off," which was published one issue per month between January and April 1991 by the Disney subsidiary W. D. Publications, Inc. as part of their Disney Comics line.
