= TaleSpin (Sega video game) =

1992 video game

- Developer: Interactive Designs
- Publisher: Sega
- Composer: Paul Gadbois
- Series: TaleSpin
- Platforms: Genesis, Game Gear
- Release: Genesis: NA: November 1992; EU: 1992; Game Gear: NA: March 1993; EU: 1993
- Genre: Action

TaleSpin is a platform game for the Sega Genesis and Game Gear. It is based on the Disney animated series of the same name. Sega released the game on the Sega Mega Drive/Genesis in 1992 and Game Gear in 1993.

== Plot ==
This game involves the adventures of Baloo and Kit Cloudkicker, two bears delivering cargo for Rebecca Cunningham, another bear. However, Shere Khan, the evil tiger tycoon, wants to put Rebecca out of business, so he hires air pirates, led by Don Karnage, to do his dirty work.

Baloo and Kit face up against Shere Khan's company in a contest to earn a lifetime work contract from the city of Cape Suzette.

== Gameplay ==
=== Mega Drive/Genesis ===
The Sega Mega Drive/Genesis version of the game is a platform game for up to two players, playing as either Baloo or Kit. The aim of each level is to collect at least 10 cargo boxes in order to open the exit.

=== Game Gear ===
The Game Gear version is a platform game, similar to the Mega Drive/Genesis version, in which players can again control either Baloo or Kit and have to collect cargo boxes through the levels.

== Reception ==
Reception

Review scores
Publication	Score
Computer and Video Games	SMD: 75/100
Mega Zone	GG: 80/100

== See also ==
- List of Disney video games
