= Larry Latham =

Larry Latham may refer to:

- Moondog Spot (1952–2003), American professional wrestler whose real name was Larry Latham
- Larry Latham (animator) (1953–2014), American Emmy-winning animator, artist, producer and director
