= Richard Karron =

American actor

- Born: Richard Karant; April 11, 1934; The Bronx, New York, U.S.
- Died: March 1, 2017 (aged 82); Wilmington, North Carolina, U.S.
- Occupation: Actor
- Years active: 1975–2000

Richard Karron (born Richard Karant; April 11, 1934 – March 1, 2017) was an American actor who was noted for his distinctive voice. He was known for his roles in History of the World: Part I, The Flintstones in Viva Rock Vegas and Fatso.

== Early life ==
Karron was born in The Bronx, New York, to Samuel and Gertrude Karant. He served in the Army in the Korean War for eight years and was an Honor Guard at the Tomb of the Unknown Soldier. After a career as a salesman, he then was discovered by Dustin Hoffman at 'Catch a Rising Star' in New York and started an acting career. Karron was in the entertainment industry including stage, television, and film and voice overs well into his late 60s and early 70s. He married his wife, Judy, in September 2001 and they later moved from New York to Wrightsville Beach, North Carolina, where he contributed to the community through Canines for Service and self-recovery programs.

== Filmography ==
=== Film ===
Year	Title	Role	Notes
1977	Fun with Dick and Jane	Pool Builder	
1977	Roosevelt and Truman	Richie	Television film
1977	The World's Greatest Lover	Bodyguard	
1977	Mad Bull	Yapopotsky, 'The Cave Man'	Television film
1978	The One and Only	The Elephant	
1979	Young Guy Christian	Junkman	Television film
1979	A Pleasure Doing Business	Scarpuchi	
1980	Fatso	Sonny	
1980	The Further Adventures of Wally Brown	Bruno	Television film
1981	History of the World: Part I	Prehistoric Man #2	
1981	Pen 'n' Inc.	Delivery Man	Television film
1983	Dempsey	Morgan	Television film
1987	Spaceballs	Pizza the Hutt	Actor in original takes
1990	The Jackie Bison Show	Larry J. Lizard	Voice, television film
1998	An American Tail: The Treasure of Manhattan Island	Mr. O'Bloat	Voice, direct-to-video
2000	Ready to Rumble	Sanitation Guy	
2000	The Flintstones in Viva Rock Vegas	Bronto Crane	Final film role

=== TV ===
Year	Title	Role	Notes
1975	Baretta	Malcolm	Episode: "The Big Hand's on Trouble"
1975	Kojak	Alley Oop	Episode: "A Long Way from Times Square"
1976	The Blue Knight	Herman	Episode: "A Slight Case of Murder"
1977	Laverne & Shirley	Robert A. Markland	Episode: "The Robot Lawsuit"
1979	Starsky & Hutch	Hammerlock Grange	Episode: "The Golden Angel"
1980	Good Time Harry	Lenny	7 episodes
1982	Teachers Only	Mr Pafko	8 episodes
1983	Laverne & Shirley	The Ghost	Episode: "The Ghost Story"
1983–1984	Webster	Maurice	8 episodes
1984	Three's Company	Officer	Episode: "Forget Me Not"
1986	Santa Barbara	Man in Bar	Episode 367
1989	Growing Pains	Philly	Episode: "Paper Route"
1991	Pro Stars		Voice
1992	Goof Troop	Slick	Voice, episode: "Counterfeit Goof"
1992	Bobby's World		Voice, episode: "Swim by Me"
1991–1992	Darkwing Duck	Joke Store Owner / A.F. Erret	Voice, 2 episodes
1992	The Little Mermaid	Ebb	Voice, episode: "Beached"
1993	Bonkers		Voice, episode: "In Toons We Trust"
1995	What-a-Mess		Voice, 3 episodes
1994–1995	Weird Science	Mr. Brinkman	2 episodes
1995	Timon & Pumbaa	Herman / Eddie the Snake	Voice, 2 episodes
1996	Quack Pack	Doctor	Voice, episode: "The Germinator"
1996	Pinky and the Brain	Sweaty Pete	Voice, episode: "The Pink Candidate"
1997	Pacific Blue		Episode: "Rave On"
1997	George and Leo	Chief Big Heart	Episode: "The Halloween Show"
1997	L.A. Heat	Landlord	Episode: "Captain Crimestopper"
