= What a Dummy =

1990 American syndicated TV sitcom

- Genre: Sitcom
- Created by: Leslie Eberhard; Barbara Hobart; Arthur L. Annecharico; Craig Kellem
- Directed by: Scott Redman; Jerry Ross
- Starring: Stephen Dorff; Joshua Rudoy; David Doty; Annabel Armour; Janna Michaels; Kaye Ballard
- Voices of: Loren Freeman
- Composer: Bill Fulton
- Country of origin: United States
- Original language: English
- No. of seasons: 1
- No. of episodes: 24

Production
- Executive producer: Arthur Annecharico
- Production companies: The Arthur Company; MCA TV

Original release
- Network: Syndication
- Release: September 29, 1990 – May 25, 1991

What a Dummy is a syndicated television sitcom that lasted for one season in 1990 until 1991.

== Premise ==
The premise of the show was that the Brannigan family of Secaucus, New Jersey was getting advice from a talking, thinking ventriloquist's dummy named Buzz (voiced by Loren Freeman), who had been locked in a trunk for fifty years before being discovered by the family. Kaye Ballard played the family's next-door neighbor, Mrs. Treva Travalony. The animatronic puppet used for Buzz was created by special effects artists Alec Gillis and Tom Woodruff Jr. of Amalgamated Dynamics, and puppeteered by Mark Rappaport.

== Cast ==
- Stephen Dorff as Tucker Brannigan
- Joshua Rudoy as Cory Brannigan
- David Doty as Ed Brannigan
- Annabel Armour as Polly Brannigan
- Janna Michaels as Maggie Brannigan
- Kaye Ballard as Treva Travalony
- Loren Freeman as Buzz (voice)

== Episodes ==
No.	Title	Directed by	Written by	Original release date
1	"What a Dummy"	Scott Redman	Unknown	September 29, 1990
When Ed Brannigan's great uncle passes away, they discover a steamer trunk full of old props left over from the days when his Uncle Jackie had a traveling ventriloquist show, including Buzz, the dummy. Only this dummy talks and isn't too happy about being left in a trunk for 50 years.
2	"My Hero"	Scott Redman	Unknown	October 6, 1990
After Cory saves Tucker's life, that life then becomes slavery when Tucker must do anything and everything Cory wants.
3	"The Contractor from Hell"	Scott Redman	Unknown	October 13, 1990
In Ed's attempt to save money, Lucky Ernesto is hired to fix a plumbing problem. Unfortunately, this was not a smart move and Ed ends up having to take Lucky to court.
4	"Whose Life Is It Anyway?"	Scott Redman	Unknown	October 20, 1990
In order to attract the eye and affections of a young lady, Tucker takes on the persona of his sensitive brother and tries to act like Cory would act if he were in the same situation.
5	"The Champ"	Scott Redman	Unknown	October 27, 1990
Tucker is suffering from feelings of low self worth, so Ed tries to help by offering him a position at the restaurant while Cory nurses a broken heart.
6	"Good Neighbor Brannigan"	Scott Redman	Unknown	November 3, 1990
Trying to be the nice and friendly neighbors, the Brannigans invite their next door neighbors out to dinner, only to find that they are a couple of strange birds.
7	"Car Wars"	Scott Redman	Unknown	November 10, 1990
Tucker's mom, Polly, covers for him by taking the blame after the young man wrecks his dad's cherry Mustang.
8	"Grandpa Lou"	Scott Redman	Unknown	November 17, 1990
9	"What I Did for Love"	Scott Redman	Unknown	November 24, 1990
10	"The Substitute"	Scott Redman	Unknown	December 1, 1990
11	"Unmarried... with Children"	Scott Redman	Unknown	December 8, 1990
12	"Bringing Up Baby"	Jerry Ross	Unknown	January 26, 1991
13	"Buzz Is Loaded"	Scott Redman	Unknown	February 2, 1991
14	"Fear Itself"	Scott Redman	Unknown	February 9, 1991
15	"The Babysitter"	Scott Redman	Unknown	February 16, 1991
16	"Tucker's on the Air"	Scott Redman	Unknown	February 23, 1991
17	"Mrs. Grumbacher's Talent Show"	Scott Redman	Unknown	March 2, 1991
18	"My Imaginary Friend"	Scott Redman	Unknown	March 9, 1991
19	"The Vacation That Never Was"	Jerry Ross	Unknown	March 16, 1991
20	"Buzz for Sale"	Scott Redman	Unknown	April 27, 1991
21	"The Nudge Who Came to Dinner"	Scott Redman	Unknown	May 4, 1991
22	"Treasure of the Sierra Secaucus"	Scott Redman	Unknown	May 11, 1991
23	"Knock on Wood"	Scott Redman	Unknown	May 18, 1991
24	"Toys Aren't Us"	Scott Redman	Unknown	May 25, 1991

== International broadcast ==
The series also aired in Germany, as Der Familienschreck (The Family Fright), Spanish countries as Vaya muñeco (Go Doll), and Italy as L’amico di legno (The Wooden Friend).
