= An American Tail: The Treasure of Manhattan Island =

1998 animated film directed by Larry Latham

- Original VHS cover
- Directed by: Larry Latham
- Written by: Len Uhley
- Based on: Characters by David Kirschner
- Produced by: Larry Latham
- Starring: Thomas Dekker; Lacey Chabert; Elaine Bilstad; Pat Musick; Dom DeLuise; René Auberjonois; David Carradine; John Kassir; Sherman Howard; Tony Jay; Nehemiah Persoff; Erica Yohn; Richard Karron; Ron Perlman
- Music by: Michael Tavera; James Horner (archive music)
- Production companies: Universal Family & Home Entertainment Production; Universal Cartoon Studios; TMS-Kyokuichi Corporation (Japanese Animation services)
- Distributed by: Universal Studios Home Video
- Release dates: November 16, 1998 (United Kingdom); February 15, 2000 (United States)
- Running time: 79 minutes
- Country: United States
- Language: English

An American Tail: The Treasure of Manhattan Island (also known as An American Tail III: The Treasure of Manhattan Island) is a 1998 American animated film produced by Universal Cartoon Studios and directed by Larry Latham. It is the third film in the An American Tail series and the first film in the series not to be produced by Amblin Entertainment.

While retaining Dom DeLuise throughout the film series, the film reunites the voice cast of Nehemiah Persoff and Erica Yohn from both An American Tail (1986) and An American Tail: Fievel Goes West, Pat Musick from An American Tail with the return of her character Tony Toponi, and introduces Elaine Bilstad, René Auberjonois, David Carradine, John Kassir, Ron Perlman, Tony Jay and Richard Karron. Fievel and Tanya Mousekewitz's voices were performed by Thomas Dekker and Lacey Chabert, replacing the previous voice actors Phillip Glasser, Amy Green from the 1986 film, and Cathy Cavadini from both Fievel Goes West and the TV series Fievel's American Tails.

The film premiered in the United Kingdom on November 16, 1998, and was released in the United States and Canada on February 15, 2000.

== Plot ==
In New York City, sometime after the events of the first film, the Mousekewitz family has settled into life in America. The events of the second film are revealed to have been a dream Fievel had. He and his friend Tony snoop around an abandoned subway and stumble upon the remains of a dead mouse clutching a treasure map. They turn to an archaeologist Tony knows, rat Dr. Dithering, who deciphers the map and learns that it leads to an ancient treasure underneath Manhattan left behind by the Lenape, New York's pre-colonial inhabitants; he organizes an expedition to find this treasure, bringing Fievel, Tony, Tiger, and his assistant Scuttlebutt. The group survive several traps only to discover that the "treasure" the map had referred to was actually a village of Lenape mice buried deep underground. The Lenape welcome the visitors from the surface and explain that they retreated to their hidden village upon witnessing the treatment of the human Lenape by the European colonists. The sachem, Chief Wulisso, decides to send his daughter, Cholena, to the surface to see if they have "changed their ways."

Meanwhile, Fievel's father works at a cheese factory run by Mr. Grasping, Mr. Toplofty, and Mr. O'Bloat. The overworked, underpaid workers are beginning to grow resentful of the mistreatment at the factory, but they are intimidated into compliance by the NYPD, led by the brutal Chief McBrusque, who is on Grasping, Toplofty, and O'Bloat's payroll. Upon the expedition's return, Scuttlebutt (who is secretly also on Grasping, Toplofty, and O'Bloat's payroll) reports the existence of the Lenape village to the factory owners, who see an opportunity to distract the workers from their grievances. Taking advantage of the anti-Native American sentiments among the populace, Grasping works the mice of New York into a frenzy and sends them out to capture Cholena and anyone aiding her. When Papa quickly warns his family and Tony that Cholena is in danger, a disguised Cholena gets separated from Fievel and the others during the ensuing riot. Fievel and Tony manage to save Cholena from the police, but Dr. Dithering is captured by the mob and taken to the butcher's shop for trial. Reunited, Papa instructs Fievel, Tony, and Tanya to take Cholena back to her village while he and Tiger save Dithering.

At the butcher shop, Dithering is sentenced to death, but he is saved by Tiger before the police mice can execute him. Papa appears before the crowd and makes them realize that the factory owners are using xenophobia to divide them. Seeing the workers turning against them, Mr. Grasping, Mr. Toplofty, and Mr. O'Bloat quickly make their escape and instruct McBrusque to wipe out the Lenape to prevent an alliance between them and the workers.

Upon returning Cholena to her home, Fievel helps to protect the village by creating a diversion. McBrusque, Scuttlebutt, and the other police officers show up to the village, but Fievel and the Lenape drive them away. To prevent future intruders, the chief gives Fievel, Tanya, and Tony a gunpowder bomb to collapse the tunnel connecting the underground village to the outside world. But before they can do so, they are attacked by the enraged McBrusque and Scuttlebutt who attempt to get revenge on the Mousekewitz children and Tony, but the two crooks are overpowered and Fievel manages to set off the bomb. This floods the tunnel, together with McBrusque and Scuttlebutt as they fall into the chasm to their deaths. Tony and Tanya manage to reach higher ground, but Fievel is seemingly carried off by the current.

When the water recedes, Tanya and Tony desperately search through the mud to find him before Fievel miraculously breaks through the surface. The three share a muddy group hug, thankful that everyone survived. Afterwards, Papa forms a worker's union and Mr. Grasping, Mr. Toplofty, and Mr. O'Bloat are forced to negotiate with them to avoid a labor strike and the wrath of Tiger, who becomes the new police chief. Using a foldable telescope given from Dr. Dithering, Fievel sees Cholena and her father disappearing into a hidden door at the top of a park statue, which pleases him as he wishes for the best for them.

== Voice cast ==
- Thomas Dekker as Fievel Mousekewitz
- Lacey Chabert as Tanya Mousekewitz
- Nehemiah Persoff as Papa Mousekewitz
- Erica Yohn as Mama Mousekewitz
- Dom DeLuise as Tiger
- Pat Musick as Tony Toponi
- Elaine Bilstad as Cholena
  - Leeza Miller as Cholena's singing voice
- René Auberjonois as Dr. Dithering
- David Carradine as Chief Wulisso
- Ron Perlman as Mr. Grasping
- Tony Jay as Mr. Toplofty
- Richard Karron as Mr. O'Bloat
- Sherman Howard as Police Chief McBrusque
- John Kassir as Scuttlebutt
- Dave Mallow as additional voices

== Production ==
Following a six year hiatus for the An American Tail series, Universal kicked off a $15 million marketing campaign to reignite interest in the franchise with re-releases of the first two films leading up to the release of An American Tail III with the fourth installment scheduled for the following June. The mandate for the series as dictated by then President of Universal Worldwide Home Entertainment, Louis Feola, was "...to create the same value and success for An American Tail as the studio did with the Land Before Time". However, there were various distribution challenges, including problems with animation quality and storyline development, that prevented this film from being released on time as it was delayed further until the 21st century.

=== Animation ===
Japanese studio TMS-Kyokuichi Corporation was the overseas animation studio for the film, one of the overseas companies that worked on Steven Spielberg's previous works Tiny Toon Adventures and Animaniacs for Warner Bros., despite that Spielberg wasn’t involved in the project nor was it worked on at Amblin Entertainment.

=== Casting ===
New voices were handed out for Fievel and Tanya during production while some of the original characters retaining their original voices from the first film. Phillip Glasser was unable to recast as Fievel for this film due to voice changing by age, as Glasser was 19 at the time. Universal hired then-child actor Thomas Dekker as Fievel. Then-15-year-old Lacey Chabert was chosen as the voice for Tanya. The previous actress, Cathy Cavadini, could not participate in the role at the time due to being under the contract for Cartoon Network while casting for Blossom in The Powerpuff Girls. Pat Musick returned to reprise her role as Tony, as the character returns since An American Tail in 1986. Several other voices from the original film didn’t return, causing their characters to be dropped from the project.

Universal hired actors from the previous works to voice the characters for this film. René Auberjonois (Odo in Star Trek: Deep Space Nine), David Carradine (Kwai Chang Caine in Kung Fu), Ron Perlman (Vincent in Beauty and the Beast), and John Kassir (the Crypt-Keeper from the Tales from the Crypt franchise) are cast as Dr. Dithering, Chief Wulisso, Mr. Grasping, and Scuttlebutt, respectively.

Elaine Bilstad, a Native American actress, was chosen to voice for Cholena. Bilstad was previously given limited roles as one-time characters in Walker, Texas Ranger, Baywatch Nights, and as Catherine in the TV movie The Broken Chain. She even played White Snow, the indigenous version of Snow White in Happily Ever After: Fairy Tales for Every Child. This was Bilstad's final film role.

== Songs ==
In addition to three original songs, archive music from the first two films are reused.

All tracks are written by Michael Tavera.

No.	Title	Performer(s)	Length
1.	"We Live in Manhattan"	Chorus
2.	"Friends of the Working Mouse"	Ron Perlman, Tony Jay & Richard Karron
3.	"Anywhere in Your Dreams"	Leeza Miller & Thomas Dekker

== Release ==
Advertisement of the third film shown inside the cover of the 1998 reissues of An American Tail and An American Tail: Fievel Goes West while being delayed.

As early as March 17, 1998, The Treasure of Manhattan Island was advertised on the VHS release of The Chipmunk Adventure. It was then advertised on the VHS reissues of An American Tail and its sequel Fievel Goes West on August 11 the same year. Unfortunately, the film's North American release date remained undisclosed until late December 1999, receiving the VHS release on February 15, 2000. It was later released on DVD on January 20, 2004, with a sing-along version of "Anywhere In Your Dreams" as a bonus feature. It was later combined in a DVD set packaged with three other films on June 13, 2017.

=== Overseas ===
The film premiered in the United Kingdom in November 1998. It was also released on April 6, 2001 in Italy, January 2, 2003 in Spain, February 9, 2003 in Australia, April 3, 2003 in Russia, June 19, 2003 in France, November 4, 2003 in Germany and April 4, 2006 in Japan.

== Reception ==
Robert Pardi of TV Guide gave the film 2 out of 5 stars and wrote: "Although the bright and bubbly animation lacks depth, these cute little vermin have just enough personality to make tykes unaware they're being spoonfed ethnic-harmony aphorisms". Susan King of the Los Angeles Times wrote that young children under 10-years-old might find it entertaining. Grace Montgomery of Common Sense Media felt that the politically sensitive elements depicted in the film are "out of place for An American Tail" and recommended that "your kids would be better off to stick with the original An American Tail and skip this one".
