= TaleSpin =

American animated television series

- Genre: Action/adventure; Comedy; Dieselpunk
- Created by: Jymn Magon; Mark Zaslove
- Based on: Characters by Rudyard Kipling; Larry Clemmons; Ralph Wright; Ken Anderson; Vance Gerry; Bill Peet
- Directed by: Larry Latham; Robert Taylor
- Voices of: Ed Gilbert; R. J. Williams; Sally Struthers; Janna Michaels; Pat Fraley; Jim Cummings; Charlie Adler; Chuck McCann; Tony Jay; Lorenzo Music; Rob Paulsen; Frank Welker
- Theme music composer: Silversher & Silversher
- Opening theme: "TaleSpin Theme" by Jim Gilstrap
- Ending theme: "TaleSpin Theme" (Instrumental)
- Composer: Christopher L. Stone
- Country of origin: United States
- Original language: English
- No. of seasons: 1
- No. of episodes: 65 (list of episodes)

Production
- Producers: Robert Taylor; Ed Ghertner; Larry Latham; Jamie Mitchell
- Running time: 22 minutes
- Production companies: Walt Disney Television Animation (Note: Animation outsourced to Hanho Heung-Up, Sunwoo Animation, Walt Disney Animation France, Walt Disney Animation Japan and Wang Film Productions.); Walt Disney Television

Original release
- Network: The Disney Channel (preview); First-run syndication
- Release: September 7, 1990 – August 8, 1991

TaleSpin is an American animated television series produced by Walt Disney Television Animation. The series reimagines characters from Disney's 1967 film The Jungle Book in an aviation-themed setting. The premise centers on laid-back pilot Baloo and his ambitious young navigator Kit Cloudkicker, who fly deliveries for Rebecca Cunningham's small cargo business Higher for Hire, using their seaplane the Sea Duck. They operate from the fortified coastal city of Cape Suzette while contending with air pirates, corrupt businessmen, and exotic locales.

The series premiered as a preview-run on The Disney Channel in 1990 before entering syndication as part of The Disney Afternoon programming block later that year. The show is one of nine Disney Afternoon shows to use established Disney characters as the main characters, with the other eight being: Darkwing Duck, DuckTales, Chip 'n Dale: Rescue Rangers, Goof Troop, Bonkers, Quack Pack, Aladdin, and Timon & Pumbaa. It is also one of two Disney animated television series based on Rudyard Kipling's The Jungle Book, the second being Jungle Cubs.

== Background ==
=== Development ===
The series was largely developed by writers Jymn Magon and Mark Zaslove, who were also the supervising producers on the series as well as story editors. There were four production teams, each one headed by a producer/director: Robert Taylor, Larry Latham, Jamie Mitchell, and Ed Ghertner.

Initially, Disney simply commissioned Magon and Zaslove with creating a thirty-minute animated program for them, with no requirements as to what the show should be about. Nearing the deadline for a pitch without having come up with anything, Magon hit upon the idea of making the story about Baloo, one of the central characters of Disney's The Jungle Book, which had recently been theatrically rereleased. The show Tales of the Gold Monkey was an inspiration according to creator/supervising producer, Jymn Magon. Similar to the main character in that show, they decided to have Baloo work for an air cargo delivery service, a concept also occasionally featured on Disney's successful DuckTales. In order to add dramatic tension, they decided to maintain the impressionable son/bad father dynamic which had driven part of the plot of The Jungle Book, replacing the human Mowgli with the anthropomorphic bear Kit. Inspired by Cheers — then one of the most popular programs on television — Magon and Zaslove created the character Rebecca (voiced by actress Sally Struthers), basing her on the character Rebecca Howe and giving her that character's arc of being an intelligent and headstrong yet inexperienced manager put in charge of a fledgling business. Deciding to make the show a period piece, the pair lastly decided to make one of the show's primary locations a neutral zone inspired by Rick Blaine's bar in Casablanca, where they inserted the character of Louie in place of Rick. The decision to add Shere Khan to the cast was not made until later in the show's development. Magon and Zaslove also took inspiration from Hayao Miyazaki's 1989 manga Hikōtei Jidai, about a pig-headed man who flies a seaplane and fights air pirates. Two years after TaleSpin premiered, Miyazaki released an anime adaptation called Porco Rosso, which Zaslove felt took cues from TaleSpin. Phil Harris, who voiced Baloo for the film, was initially hired to reprise the role; at age 85, however, Harris had lost some of his comic timing and had to be chauffeured from his home in Palm Springs for each recording session. His work was discarded and Ed Gilbert took over the role for the rest of the series. According to Magon, the relationship between Baloo and Rebecca was fashioned after Sam Malone and Rebecca Howe from the then-popular sitcom Cheers.

Famed Uncle Scrooge comic writer and artist Don Rosa wrote episode 6, "It Came from Beneath the Sea Duck", and episode 9, "I Only Have Ice for You".

The series was animated by Walt Disney Animation (Japan) Inc., Hanho Heung-Up Co., Ltd., Jade Animation, Tama Productions, Walt Disney Animation (France) S.A., Sunwoo Entertainment, and Wang Film Productions.

=== Broadcast ===
After a preview-run of TaleSpin aired on The Disney Channel from May 5 to July 15, 1990, the series began its main syndicated run in September of the same year. The original concept was embodied in the pilot episode and introductory television movie Plunder & Lightning which was the sole nominee for an Emmy Award for Outstanding Animated Program (For Programming More Than One Hour) in 1991. After its premiere on September 7, 1990, Plunder & Lightning was re-edited into four half-hour episodes for reruns. The show was often seen either on its own as a half-hour show, or as part of the two-hour syndicated programming block The Disney Afternoon. TaleSpin ended on its 65th episode which aired on August 8, 1991, but reruns continued to be shown on The Disney Afternoon until September 1994. On October 2, 1995, TaleSpin began reruns on The Disney Channel as part of a two-hour programming block called "Block Party" which aired on weekdays in the late-afternoon/early-evening and which also included Darkwing Duck, DuckTales, and Chip 'n Dale: Rescue Rangers. Later, the show was aired on Toon Disney, where it was first aired from April 1998 until January 2006 (with a hiatus between 2001 and 2002) and later from January 2007 until May 2008. Throughout its broadcast history, the series has been subjected to numerous edits.

== Synopsis ==
TaleSpin is set in a fictional world populated entirely by anthropomorphic animals and characterized by early aviation technology. The primary locale is Cape Suzette, a harbor city safeguarded by towering cliffs armed with anti-aircraft artillery to repel invaders.

The premise follows Baloo, a laid-back but skilled bush pilot who flies the Sea Duck, a modified seaplane, for Higher for Hire, a small cargo delivery service based in Cape Suzette. Baloo takes the position after falling on hard times, putting himself under the employ of determined entrepreneur Rebecca Cunningham, a single mother to her precocious young daughter Molly. Joined by his eager young navigator, Kit Cloudkicker, an orphaned former air pirate, and the quirky mechanic Wildcat, Baloo undertakes perilous cargo runs across treacherous skies and exotic locales. These missions frequently pit the crew against such antagonists as the theatrical air pirate Don Karnage, the ruthless corporate magnate Shere Khan, and the authoritarian state of Thembria.

== Home media ==
=== VHS releases ===
Eight VHS cassettes containing 15 episodes of the series were released in the United States.

VHS name	Episode titles	Release date
True Baloo	"From Here to Machinery" & "The Balooest of the Bluebloods"	August 9, 1991
That's Show Biz!	"Stormy Weather" & "Mommy for a Day"	August 9, 1991
Jackpots & Crackpots	"A Touch of Glass" & "Her Chance to Dream"	August 9, 1991
Fearless Flyers	"Jumping the Guns" & "Mach One for the Gipper"	August 9, 1991
Treasure Trap	"The Idol Rich" & "Polly Wants a Treasure"	February 28, 1992
Imagine That!	"Flight of the Snow Duck" & "Flight School Confidential"	February 28, 1992
Wise Up!	"Molly Coddled" & "The Sound and the Furry"	February 28, 1992
Search for the Lost City	"For Whom the Bell Klangs" (Parts 1 & 2)	February 28, 1992

==== Australia and New Zealand releases ====
Eleven VHS cassettes containing 21 episodes of the series were released in Australia and New Zealand.

VHS name	Episode titles	Release date
TaleSpin (Volume 1): Fearless Flyers	"From Here to Machinery" & "The Balooest of the Bluebloods"	September 11, 1991
TaleSpin (Volume 2): Baloo Skies	"Stormy Weather" & "For a Fuel Dollars More"	September 11, 1991
TaleSpin (Volume 3): Dare-Devil Bears	"Mommy for a Day" & "The Idol Rich"	September 11, 1992
TaleSpin (Volume 4): Hot Shot Heroes	"Jumping the Guns" & "Mach One for the Gipper"	September 11, 1992
TaleSpin (Volume 5): Imagine That	"Flight of the Snow Duck" & "Flight School Confidential"	September 11, 1992
TaleSpin (Volume 6): Treasure Trap	"Polly Wants a Treasure" & "The Bigger They Are, the Louder They Oink"	April 2, 1993
TaleSpin (Volume 7): True Baloo	"The Time Bandit" & "Louie's Last Stand"	April 2, 1993
TaleSpin (Volume 8): Jackpots & Crackpots	"Her Chance to Dream" & "A Touch of Glass"	September 10, 1993
TaleSpin (Volume 9): That's Show Biz!	"I Only Have Ice for You" & "It Came from Beneath the Sea Duck"	September 10, 1993
TaleSpin (Volume 10): Wise Up!	"Molly Coddled" & "The Sound and the Furry"	September 10, 1993
TaleSpin (Volume 11): Search for the Lost City	"For Whom the Bell Klangs" (Parts 1 & 2)	September 10, 1993

=== DVD releases ===
Walt Disney Studios Home Entertainment has released the complete series on DVD; three volumes have been released in Region 1 featuring all 65 episodes of the series. The first volume was released on August 29, 2006 (containing episodes 1–27) and the second on November 13, 2007 (containing episodes 28–54). Volume 2 includes the controversial episode "Last Horizons", which never re-aired on broadcast syndication although it did re-air on The Disney Channel and Toon Disney. On June 25, 2013, the third and final volume was released on DVD via the Disney Movie Club Exclusives. TaleSpin: Volume 3 is also for sale on DisneyStore.com.

TaleSpin: Volume 3 received a wide retail DVD release on January 13, 2015, and has been seen as a Wal-Mart Exclusive in Canada since October 12, 2014. It was also available in Southeast Asia and in the United States since October 14, 2014.

DVD name	Ep#	Release date
TaleSpin: Volume 1	1-27	August 29, 2006
TaleSpin: Volume 2	28-54	November 13, 2007
TaleSpin: Volume 3	55-65	June 25, 2013 (Disney Movie Club); October 12, 2014 (retail)

=== International releases ===
The series has been released into several volumes in different countries, each containing only 4 episodes each.

==== Germany ====
In Germany, the series of 3-disc sets, starting with Collection 1, was released on December 5, 2012, in Region 2, PAL format. The sets contain the episodes in the same order as the US releases, as well as a Fastplay feature and 6 language tracks: English, Danish, German, Italian, Norwegian and Swedish, but no subtitles have been added. the first collection has only 17 episodes. A second collection, containing 16 episodes, was released on March 7, 2013. A third collection, containing 17 episodes, was released on May 29 of the same year.

A few episodes have been removed from the original list. The 1^{st} collection does not include "From Here to Machinery" and "Vowel Play". The 2^{nd} set excludes "A Touch of Glass", while the 3^{rd} set misses out "Jumping the Guns". There is no confirmation on whether these episodes will be released, along with the final 11 episodes of the series.

DVD name	Ep#	Release date
Käpt'n Balu und seine tollkühne Crew Collection 1	17	December 5, 2012
Käpt'n Balu und seine tollkühne Crew Collection 2	16	March 7, 2013
Käpt'n Balu und seine tollkühne Crew Collection 3	17	May 29, 2013
Käpt'n Balu und seine tollkühne Crew Collection 4	15	N/A

==== United Kingdom ====
The United Kingdom had only two releases, each containing 3 discs per set, the sets do skip over episodes that were present on the North American sets. The first collection came out on February 11, 2013 and the second collection was released on May 20 of the same year.

DVD name	Ep#	Release date
TaleSpin First Collection (Volumes 1–3)	17	February 11, 2013
TaleSpin Second Collection (Volumes 4–6)	16	May 20, 2013

==== Australia ====
The sets from Germany and the United Kingdom have also been released in Australia. The first collection came out on August 17, 2012. The second collection was released on March 15, 2013, followed by the third on October 11 of the same year.

DVD name	Ep#	Release date
TaleSpin First Collection (Volumes 1–3)	1-27	August 17, 2012
TaleSpin Second Collection (Volumes 4–6)	28-54	March 15, 2013
TaleSpin Third Collection	55-65	October 11, 2013

==== India ====
In India, TaleSpin was dubbed in Hindi, Tamil and Telugu for TV broadcast in the 90s along with DuckTales. In 2012, 63 Hindi dubbed episodes out of the total 65 episodes were released by Disney India on 21 DVD volumes in PAL format. These discs support DVD Region 2, Region 4 and Region 5, but due to limited number of copies, they quickly went out of stock. Each DVD contained only 3 episodes.

=== Video on demand ===
The entire series is currently available for purchase in standard definition on Amazon Prime Video and the iTunes Store in the United States.

As of November 12, 2019, the series is available to stream on Disney+, with the exception of the banned episodes "Last Horizons" and "Flying Dupes".

== Reception ==
In 2009, IGN listed TaleSpin as the 81st best animated series in its list of the Top 100 Animated TV Shows.

== Comics ==
A monthly comic book based on the show was published by the Disney subsidiary W. D. Publications, Inc. as part of their Disney Comics line in 1991, running for eleven issues, including a four-issue limited series called "Take Off" based on the series premiere episode Plunder & Lightning, which was published between January and April, followed by a series of seven regular issues published between June and December. Bobbi J.G. Weiss was the writer for regular issues 1–4 and 6–7, while "Take Off" was adapted from Plunder & Lightning and regular issue 5 was adapted from episode 35, "The Old Man and the Sea Duck", for both of which Weiss is credited for adaptation.

The comic's cancellation at the end of 1991 terminated several planned stories that would have revealed pieces of background for the main characters. This one seems to be an exception though: issue #7, "The Long Flight Home", explored Kit's past, and how he joined up with the pirates. According to the letter page in #3, a planned story for the comic's annual would have explored the origin of the Iron Vulture. In addition, #4–7 would have letters 'answered' by the characters. A collected edition called Disney's Cartoon Tales featuring TaleSpin came out in 1991 (ISBN 1-56115-269-2). It reprints #4 and 6 from the regular comic book series. Subsequent comic stories were also printed in Disney Adventures from 1990 to 1995, and then re-appeared in the Summer 2006 issue of Disney Adventures Comic Zone Magazine, as well as in The Disney Afternoon comic book published by Marvel Comics.

Although issue #8 of the monthly comic series never made it to print, the end of issue #7 included a preview for it: "Spies in Cape Suzette?! There are some mighty mysterious folk sniffing around Shere Khan Industries. When Special Agent Booker shows up to handle the problem he finds that battling foreign agents is easier than dealing with Baloo as an assistant in... THE SPY WHO BUGGED ME!"

In May 2026, Dynamite Entertainment announced a new comic series by writer Amanda Deibert and artist Carlo Lauro.

== Video games ==
Three different TaleSpin video games were produced. One game was a scrolling shooting game published by Capcom for the NES and Game Boy. The other two were platform games; one developed by Sega for the Genesis and Game Gear, and the other by NEC for the TurboGrafx-16. Rebecca, Kit, Baloo, Don Karnage and Shere Khan from Talespin also appeared on cards in the 1993 puzzle game Mickey's Memory Challenge, released for Amiga and MS-DOS compatible operating systems, developed by Infogrames.

=== TailSpin (War Thunder parody game) ===
Although not an official TaleSpin game, Gaijin's War Thunder 2021 April Fools' Day event called "TailSpin" is apparently related to or inspired by the show.

This became a game mode for War Thunder again from March 10–30, 2022.

==== Content ====
A number of aircraft in the game appear to be inspired by those in the original show. Players start with the "Nimble" biplane seaplane fighter, and progress to more advanced aircraft by shooting down or getting "assists" on shooting down enemy aircraft, until reaching the mighty "Sly Duck" seaplane (which closely resembles the Sea Duck from the show). The game also includes a "Bear" pilot icon resembling Baloo and a "Fox" pilot icon. Every aircraft in the event besides the "Nimble" is from TaleSpin or heavily based on one seen in the show.

Gameplay is air arcade, and players are randomly allocated to a side. Both sides have the same aircraft.

Other content includes:

- Airship aircraft carriers.
- Custom muzzle flash, tracer, explosion, fire and smoke effects.
- A dragged art style combined with a hard gloss on all aircraft which glint when they are in the sun.
- A floating airborne map reminiscent of Ming the Merciless' cloud empire from Flash Gordon or Avatar.

== Cameos and parodies ==
- Darkwing Duck (1991–1992): In the episode "Film Flam", the front of Darkwing Duck's uniform is ripped open, revealing the TaleSpin logo on the shirt he wears underneath.
- Raw Toonage (1992): In the episode "Sheerluck Bonkers / All Potato Network / The Puck Stops Here", Don Karnage hosts the episode, teaches viewers how to look for treasure, finds a lunchbox with a picture of Baloo on it, and sword fights with Captain Hook.
- Bonkers (1993–1994): In the episode "Of Mice and Menace", Shere Khan appears in a mugshot.
- Aladdin (1994–1995): In the episode "When Chaos Comes Calling", there is a scene where the Genie transforms into a figure resembling and dressed like Baloo and is flying the Sea Duck, while Iago is dressed like Kit Cloudkicker, Jasmine has Rebecca Cunningham's clothes and hairstyle, and Abu is dressed like Louie.
- Robot Chicken (2014): In the episode "Batman Forever 21", Baloo is seen in the jungle with Mowgli and Bagheera, where he has dreams of his former life as a bush pilot, only to find out he was one and was forced into a life as a 'lazy bear'. Only Louie and Rebecca know, whereas Bagheera is hired to hide the fact. Kit Cloudkicker is only shown in flashbacks.
- Pickle and Peanut (2016): The episode "90's Adventure Bear" parodies TaleSpin with the title character being a stand-in for Baloo who leads a team consisting of characters based on King Louie and Kit as well as fellow Disney Afternoon characters Gadget and Zipper. An over-the-hill star of a long-ended show, 90's Adventure Bear has become bitter in his retirement and laments the show's lack of a DVD release, reflecting the incomplete status of many Disney Afternoon DVD releases.
- DuckTales (2017): In the premiere episode "Woo-oo!", Dewey Duck mentions Cape Suzette while trying to take his uncle Donald Duck's boat for a joyride and a newspaper in the episode references air pirates. Don Karnage and his Sky Pirates make appearances in the episodes "Sky Pirates...In the Sky!", "GlomTales!", "The Lost Cargo of Kit Cloudkicker!", and "The Last Adventure!", with Karnage voiced by Jaime Camil. In addition, adult versions of Kit Cloudkicker (voiced by Adam Pally) and Molly Cunningham (voiced by Eliza Coupe) also appear in "The Lost Cargo of Kit Cloudkicker!" and "The Last Adventure!", along with a cameo by Baloo in a Higher for Hire commercial in the former.
- War Thunder (2021): In an update published on April 1, 2021, as an April Fools' Day event, War Thunder introduced a limited time availability game mode called "TailSpin", which takes artistic inspiration from the TaleSpin cartoon series.
- Chip 'n Dale: Rescue Rangers (2022): During the Fancon event portrayed in the film, Baloo is a guest of honor who performs "Bare Necessities". Both the announcer of said show and Dale mention that Baloo was part of the Disney Afternoon only for him to return to the spotlight in 2016. During the end credits, a poster for "Disney Afternoon Fight Fest" is shown that includes art of Baloo, Kit Cloudkicker and Rebecca.

== Award ==
- Emmy Award
  - 1991 – Outstanding Animated Program (For Programming More Than One Hour) – Jymn Magon, Larry Latham, Robert Taylor, Mark Zaslove, Alan Burnett, and Len Uhley for Plunder & Lightning (juried award; did not receive enough votes to win).
