= Young Hollywood =

American multimedia entertainment company

- Company type: Private company Mass media
- Website type: Entertainment programming
- Available in: English
- Founded: April 6, 2007 (United States and Canada)
- Headquarters: Los Angeles, California, United States
- Area served: US, Canada, Europe, Asia, Middle East, North Africa, and South America
- Founder: R. J. Williams
- Key people: R. J. Williams, CEO
- Website: www.younghollywood.com
- Current status: Active

Young Hollywood is a privately held multimedia entertainment company founded in Los Angeles, California, by R. J. Williams. The company licenses the “Young Hollywood” trademark domestically and internationally for various consumer products and services. It also owns a television network and is a large producer and distributor of celebrity content in the digital space, with over 2 billion views.

== Television network ==
YHN is a 24/7 network that offers scheduled programming and an extensive video-on-demand library, currently available in more than 180 countries. Young Hollywood reaches over 700 million homes and is available in 24 languages. The network creates and delivers original content year-round to a global audience.

In early 2015, Young Hollywood exclusively partnered with Apple to launch the network with content exclusive to the Apple TV platform. The channel premiered seven new original half-hour series and programming across multiple platforms, including reality, scripted series, animation, and documentaries, focusing on entertainment, music, sports, fashion, and lifestyle. By the end of 2015, the network expanded to devices such as Roku, Amazon Fire TV, Samsung Blu-ray players, and Android tablets and phones.

== Programming ==
Young Hollywood is known for avoiding gossip and being anti-paparazzi. The YoungHollywood.com website, officially launched in 2007, reached 3 million unique visitors per month. YH further expanded its audience by creating a street team of fan ambassadors to promote Young Hollywood. Its distribution network extended the reach to over 100 million viewers.

Young Hollywood has been compared to MTV because both offer a 360-degree approach to reaching zoomers. They both create original content, have a built-in distribution network with a significant marketing arm to promote their content, and have direct relationships with advertisers.

== Partnerships ==
=== YouTube ===
Young Hollywood partnered with Google for their channel initiative to launch "The Young Hollywood Network" (YHN) on YouTube in January 2012. Other brands included in the initiative included WWE and The Wall Street Journal The Young Hollywood channel on YouTube is ranked #12 on AdAge magazine's list of "Top YouTube Original Channels of All-Time".

=== TikTok ===
Young Hollywood created the first live-streamed hit show on TikTok's live.ly platform, which has over 95 million users. The premiere episode of Young Hollywood's series had nearly 600,000 live viewers. Other notable Live.ly users include Mark Cuban and Time Inc.

=== Jimmy Kimmel Live! ===
Young Hollywood programming was parodied in a skit during a 2012 episode of Jimmy Kimmel Live!

=== Four Seasons Hotel ===
In April 2010, Young Hollywood formed a strategic partnership with the Four Seasons Hotel Los Angeles at Beverly Hills to build a fiber-optic enabled, high-definition broadcast studio within the hotel, where it conducts daily celebrity interviews. In August 2011, the partnership expanded to include the hotel's restaurant with the launch of The Young Hollywood Salad.

== International expansion ==
Young Hollywood formed an exclusive international content distribution deal with Fremantle Media. The first two series under the agreement have sold to over 30 international territories. YH content can be found on RTL Group in Germany, Middle East Broadcasting Center in the Middle East, M-Net in South Africa, and the Lifestyle Network in the Philippines.
