= List of TaleSpin characters =

This is a list of characters in the Disney animated series TaleSpin. TaleSpin was previewed on The Disney Channel in May through July 1990, and premiered in syndication in September of that year. Some of the characters also appeared in the 2017 DuckTales reboot.

== Higher for Hire ==
- Baloo (voiced by Ed Gilbert) is the main character of the series, based primarily on the sloth bear from Disney's The Jungle Book. Although lazy, slobbish, unreliable and always broke, he is also an excellent pilot and capable of the most daring maneuvers in the air. He flies a cargo plane called the Sea Duck. He will also selflessly come to the aid of those in need of help. His irresponsible behavior sometimes jeopardizes important situations. In the episode "The Balooest of the Bluebloods", it is revealed that Baloo comes from a prominent noble family and that his full name is Baloo, Baron von Bruinwald XIII. Gilbert replaced Phil Harris, who had originally been hired to reprise his role from The Jungle Book. At 85 years old, Harris had lost some of his comic timing, and producers concluded he would not be able to handle the load of a 65-episode series at his age and condition, nor were they in the position to chauffeur him to and from his home in Palm Springs, California, a two-hour trip in each direction, for each session. To perfect his rendition of Baloo's voice, Gilbert listened to old recordings of Phil Harris and practiced for many hours until he had it just right.
- Kit Cloudkicker (voiced by R. J. Williams as a child in some episodes, Alan Roberts in others, Adam Pally as an adult in the 2017 DuckTales series) is a 12-year-old brown bear cub and the navigator aboard Baloo's plane, the Sea Duck. Having lived with the air pirates under Don Karnage for one year prior to the start of the series, the introductory film states that he left the air pirates because he "got sick" of them, implying that either he was mistreated or he got tired of Karnage's arrogance and ruthlessness. It is not exactly known when, where or how Kit was orphaned, but in the associated comics, it was revealed he spent some of his life on the streets and later a village of hobos (not unlike the Hoovervilles of actuality) prior to the series. He also claims that he never knew his parents, which could mean he had lost them when he was too young to remember. In the 2017 DuckTales series, Kit was owner of both the Sea Duck and Higher for Hire, which he lamented in as he did "what was expected of him". He still possessed his air foil skills and when the adult Molly Cunningham bought the Sea Duck for her "Danger Woman's Circus", she convinced him to join her circus as a performer, rather than a pilot, showing she respects his skills.
- Rebecca Cunningham (voiced by Sally Struthers) is a bear who bought Baloo's Air Service and his plane in the introductory episode Plunder & Lightning when the pilot failed to pay his bank loan, and renamed the business "Higher for Hire". Although she originally relegated herself to the administrative and sales functions of the business, the series shows she eventually learns to be a capable would-be pilot in her own right.
- Molly Elizabeth Cunningham (voiced by Janna Michaels, Eliza Coupe as an adult in the 2017 DuckTales series) is Rebecca's yellow-furred, 6-year-old daughter. She is an adventurous child who even at her age, is not afraid to speak her mind just like her mother, who nicknames her "Honey" and "Pumpkin". No mention was ever made of Molly's father, as series creator Jymn Magon reportedly said that Rebecca is either a widow or divorced, although at a 1998 U.S. fan convention Q&A online chat he did state in roundabout tones that she is divorced. In the 2017 DuckTales series, Molly, like Kit, has grown up, and like her mother, became the proprietor, but of a circus called "Danger Woman's Flying Circus". She acquires the Sea Duck and recruits Kit as a performer for his recurring air foil skills.
- Wildcat (voiced by Pat Fraley) is a clueless and gangly lion who typically wears a mechanic's outfit. Although very childlike, he is ultimately a mechanical genius. For example, he can fix a smashed telephone in under ten seconds. He is honest and truthful, but at times too truthful, much to the annoyance of Baloo.

== Air Pirates ==
- Don Karnage (voiced by Jim Cummings, Jaime Camil in DuckTales) is the leader of a crew of air pirates and captain of the massive hybrid airship, the Iron Vulture, which serves as an airborne aircraft carrier. He is the main antagonist in the series. According to series creator Jymn Magon, he is a red wolf, but has orangish-brown fur reminiscent of a fox. When dogfighting or raiding, Karnage flies a hybrid fighter plane that appears to be based on a low-wing monoplane but with wings added so that it is actually a triplane. Voice actor Jim Cummings cited Desi Arnaz's performance as Ricky Ricardo from the TV sitcom I Love Lucy as an inspiration for Karnage.

=== Other pirates ===
- Mad Dog (voiced by Charlie Adler) is a scrawny coyote with a "Fu Manchu" style mustache who wears aviator goggles on his head. He is Don Karnage's first mate (second-in-command).
- Dumptruck (voiced by Chuck McCann) is a large Mastiff who is the second mate (third-in-command) of Don Karnage. He speaks with a thick Swedish-Dutch accent.
- Gibber (voiced by Chuck McCann) is a stubby American Pitbull Terrier pirate who whispers advice and other information into Karnage's ear. He has never spoken a word louder than his mumbles.
- Hacksaw (voiced by Charlie Adler) is a big yellowish colored husky pirate who has a whining Australian accent.
- Ratchet (voiced by Rob Paulsen) is a mechanic.
- Hal (voiced by Frank Welker) is a large, overweight tan cat. Seen in only a few episodes, his only major role in the series (and probably the only one where he spoke) was when he accompanied Mad Dog and Dumptruck on their mission to take over the cliff guns in the episode "Jumping the Guns".
- Sadie (voiced by Chuck McCann) is a brown Schnauzer pirate who has a gray mustache and wears a Viking helmet.
- Jock (voiced by Tony Jay) is a black Scottish Terrier and head engineer of the Iron Vulture.
- Will is a pirate who briefly appears in "In Search of Ancient Blunders".

== Thembrians ==
The Thembrians are all wild boars.

- Colonel Ivanod Spigot (voiced by Michael Gough) is a Thembrian who is unnaturally short with a Napoleon complex and a prominent lisp. He is the head of Thembria's Air Force.
- Sergeant Dunder (voiced by Lorenzo Music) is Spigot's second-in-command.
- The High Marshal (voiced by Jack Angel) is a high-ranking military official.
- Professor Boris Crackpotkin (voiced by John Stephenson) is a mad scientist who was imprisoned at Bedevilled Island Maximum Security Prison for terrorist acts in the episode "Gruel and Unusual Punishment". His name is a reference to Peter Kropotkin.
- Warden Slammer (voiced by Allan Melvin) is the prison warden of Bedevilled Island Maximum Security Prison. Although at first he seems ruthless, he is eventually revealed to be a more-or-less fair and levelheaded individual.
- Bobbo (voiced by Edan Gross) is a 12-year-old boy who enrolls in flight school in Thrembia alongside Kit.
- Wally (voiced by Jack Angel) is a manager of a Thembrian bomb factory.
- Mick (voiced by Jim MacGeorge) is a coworker and associate of Wally.

== Khan Industries ==
- Shere Khan (voiced by Tony Jay) is a Bengal tiger and the head of the corporation Khan Industries, which is the dominant economic force in the city of Cape Suzette. Dour, humorless and slightly arrogant because of his wealth and position, he takes the enjoyment of running small companies out of business with a sense of ruthlessness to skirt around the law as he so chooses. Despite his ruthless and self-interested behavior, Khan is willing to act nobly at times, such as ordering his forces into the air to protect Cape Suzette from air pirate attacks. He is also shown to respect Baloo's piloting skills.

=== Other Khan Industries members ===
- Buzz (voiced by Kenneth Mars) is a short purple-haired bird of indeterminate species who is Khan's eccentric in-house inventor as well as an old friend of Baloo.
- Mrs. Laslie Snarly (voiced by Jennifer Darling) is a shrew who is Khan's secretary.
- Doctor DeBolt (voiced by Rob Paulsen) is a rabbit who is Khan's head scientist.
- Douglas "Dougie" Benson (voiced by Mark L. Taylor) is a tabby cat and an investor working for Khan Industries who lost his job as a result of a combination of bad investments, forging Khan's signature and flagrant misuse of Khan's private air force for personal gain.
- Walters (voiced by Phil Crowley) is a gray panther investor who is Douglas Benson's aide and confidant.
- Mr. Simon Perry (voiced by Michael Bell) is a scheming and sharply-dressed cheetah employee who secretly cooperates with Khan's rival Mr. Sultan.
- Garth (voiced by Patric Zimmerman) and his unnamed partner (voiced by Tony Pope) are Khan's well-dressed panther and tiger goons respectively.
- Captain Hotspur (voiced by Frank Welker) is the gravelly-voiced lion commander of one of Khan's gunships.

== Other characters ==
- Louie (voiced by Jim Cummings) is a fun-loving orangutan who runs the nightclub and motel Louie's Place near Cape Suzette. Louie's Place doubles as a refueling station/pit stop area for pilots.
- Louise L'Amour (voiced by Jim Cummings) is an aviator and Louie's aunt. Her name is a play on the Western novelist/adventurer Louis L'Amour, and the title and plot of the episode in which she appears are loosely based on the short story The Ransom of Red Chief.
- The Jungle Aces Secret Midnight Club (often simply referred to as The Jungle Aces) is a club of young wannabe pilots, of whom Kit is a member. Other club members include club leader Ernie (a hyena; voiced by Whitby Hertford), a hippopotamus, a rabbit, and a bird.
- Oscar Vandersnoot (voiced by Ben Ryan Ganger) is a short, geeky-looking yellow bear cub and friend of Kit who wants to join his Jungle Aces Secret Midnight Club, much to the consternation of the other members. Kit and Wildcat are captured by pirates, who take them hostage along with Oscar and Baloo. Oscar manages to outsmart Karnage, saves himself and his friends, and becomes a member and honorary president of The Jungle Aces Secret Midnight Club.
- Trader Moe (voiced by Jim Cummings) is a diminutive alligator or crocodile criminal with a short temper.
- El Gato (voiced by Jim Cummings) is a large, maniacal swarthy-looking cat with a thick Spanish accent and a short temper. Accompanied by a pet crow and flying on a giant condor (both voiced by Welker), he is persistent on obtaining the Idol of Doom, a golden talisman with mystical powers.
- Professor Edward O'Bowens (voiced by Patrick Pinney) is a chimpanzee archaeologist who discovers the Idol of the Spirit Switcher, a relic with body-switching abilities.
- Ignatius (voiced by S. Scott Bullock), is an intelligent parrot who knows the location of a large treasure. He and Baloo do not get along, but he befriends Kit, and the two of them go looking for the treasure.
- Seymour (voiced by Hamilton Camp) is the red wolf owner of the aquarium/theme park Seymour's See More Seaquarium. He abuses and neglects the animals in his care, including a whale named Moby Dimple (voiced by Welker) who is befriended by Kit. Kit and Baloo become concerned about Dimple's wellbeing, much to Seymour's annoyance. Kit and Baloo eventually help Dimple escape from the theme park, and Seymour ends up getting arrested.
- Inspector Ike Burrow (voiced by Jim Cummings) is an otter and an inspector who works for ACHOO (the Agency Concerned with the Happiness of Oceanic Oddities).
- Barney O'Turret (voiced by Jack Angel) is a pig guard working in Cape Suzette.
- MacKnee (voiced by Jim Cummings) is a large koala with a nasty temper and an Australian accent who will go to any lengths to bag the perfect beast (even endangering the lives of others in the name of profit).
- Henry is an Inkara, a mythical yet gentle creature, who Molly befriends and protects from MacKnee.
- Covington (voiced by Jim Cummings) is a panther con artist who wears a moustache, sharp clothing and a toupee.
- Daring Dan Dawson (voiced by Cam Clarke) is the sleazy owner and lead performer of an aerial circus.
- Prince Neverhasbeenbroke (voiced by Jim Cummings) is a eccentric but kindly hyena who is the ruler of an unnamed Middle Eastern country.
- Howard Huge (voiced by Charlie Adler) is a rich but maniacal hippopotamus airplane designer. His name is a pun on aviation pioneer Howard Hughes.
- Jack Case (voiced by Brian Cummings) is a rabbit mailman and wannabe spy.
- Doctor Axolotl (voiced by Rodger Bumpass) is a psychotic salamander inventor who sought revenge against Shere Khan with his robot, the Mechanical Electric Laborer (M.E.L.)
- Doctor Zibaldo (voiced by Dan Castellaneta) is a short, manic fox mad scientist who invented a shrink ray for the purpose of fitting his clothes into luggage easier.
- Colonel Grogg (voiced by Michael Bell) is a jingoistic, paranoid and overly excitable military intelligence officer spaniel. Obsessed with the "threat" of an alien invasion, he clandestinely monitored and recorded Baloo's radio transmissions during his phony flight to Mars, which, unbeknownst to Grogg was actually a lame attempt to scam a two-week vacation at Lake Flaccid out of Rebecca. Grogg's uncle Bucky, realizing that he is delusional, has him demoted to private.
- Professor Martin Torque (voiced by Patrick Gorman) is a Doberman inventor who sought to replace every pilot in Cape Suzette with his Auto-Aviator (voiced by Pat Fraley), a coldly efficient robotic pilot that was bought by Shere Khan. The result was that every freelance cargo service in the city (including Higher for Hire) was put out of business, and every pilot (freelance or otherwise) was put out of work. After his attempt flops in an incident with the air pirates due to the robots' programing rendering them unable to deviate from their course, Torque attempts to sell his reprogrammed machines to the Thembrians.
- Babyface Half Nelson (voiced by Hamilton Camp) is a bulldog gangster who tricked Baloo into helping him escape police custody. His name is a reference to Baby Face Nelson.
- Mrs. Half Nelson (voiced by Billie Hayes) is Babyface Half Nelson's mother.
- Detective Thursday (voiced by Jack Angel) is a hard-boiled canine detective who runs a secret branch of the Cape Suzette police force.
- Heimlich Menudo (voiced by Kenneth Mars) is a leopard criminal with diamond teeth who is obsessed with diamonds.
  - Weazel (voiced by David Lander) - Heimlich Menudo's weasel henchmen who hates being called "weasel".
- Officer Gertalin (voiced by Danny Mann) is a dog police officer and the main underling of Detective Thursday.
- Officer Malarkey (voiced by Jim Cummings) is a pig police officer who speaks with an Irish accent.
- Tiny (voiced by Jim Cummings) is a polar bear and the owner and bartender of Tiny's Grill, a restaurant and bar frequented by gangsters.
- Mr. Sultan (voiced by Corey Burton) is a tiger who is the head of the Miniversal Corporation, the rival of Shere Khan's corporation Khan Industries.
- Kitten Kaboodle (voiced by Tress MacNeille) is a seductive blond feline Starrywood star who acts like a femme fatale and can manipulate any hapless male under her spell. Kaboodle sabotages her own films in order to boost her sagging popularity and poor acting skills. She outs herself during a plane accident she set up for Baloo and was subsequently taken in by the police.
- Katie Dodd (voiced by Ellen Gerstell) is a vixen archaeologist who discovered the lost city of Tinabula.
- Myra (voiced by Liz Georges) is a fox who is the state archaeologist and Minister of Culture for the desert country of Aridia. She enlists Baloo and Wildcat to help find a lost pyramid, in order to create a tourist attraction for her country.
- Princess Lotta L'Amour (voiced by Kath Soucie) is a fox who is the crown princess of Macadamia. She is smart and strong in comparison to her seemingly dim-witted monarch rabbit father King Amuck.
- King Amuck (voiced by Howard Morris) is an elderly rabbit who is the monarch of Macadamia and Princess Lotta L'Amour's father. Dressed as a cross between a king and a court jester, he appears at first as not too bright but is a shrewd leader who is manipulated by his scheming Royal Chancellor Trample to consider abdicating his throne. After the plot fails, Amuck frugally rewards Baloo and Louie with ten sacks of chocolate macadamia nuts.
- Chancellor Trample (voiced by Jim Cummings) is a conniving vulture out to usurp the throne of King Amuck to gain the riches of the royal house of Macadamia. After his plans go awry, he confesses his crimes, begging to be locked up and tortured than endure more of Baloo and Louie's antics.
- Owl Capone (voiced by Maurice LaMarche) is a diminutive owl gangster. He is a parody of Al Capone.
- Thaddeus E. Klang (voiced by Tim Curry) is a cobra and the leader of a cult-like organization seeking the secret weapon hidden in the lost city of Tinabula. He initially appears with metallic body parts, which are later revealed to be fake.
- Ace London (voiced by Phil Hartman) is a highly arrogant, yet highly regarded gray wolf test pilot who went to school with Baloo and makes fun of him and his capabilities after winning a game of billiards against him in.
- Whistlestop Jackson (voiced by Hamilton Camp) is a pilot and Baloo's childhood hero. By the time Rebecca hires him to be Higher for Hire's vice president, Whistlestop's skills are sorely obsolete and he does business solely based on his reputation.
- Finance Minister LaFong (voiced by Jack Angel) is the finance minister of Clopstokia who conspires with Shere Khan to secure a lucrative air cargo contract between Clopstokia and Khan Enterprises.
- Joe Magee (voiced by Hal Smith) is an old ace pilot and flight instructor who appears in the episode "The Old Man and the Sea Duck". While Baloo is flying alone in the Sea Duck, Magee helps Baloo to land at his airfield because Baloo cannot remember how to fly due to amnesia he had suffered from a blow to the head during a previous flight. He then helps Baloo regain his memories of flying by teaching him how to fly again and about the true meaning of flying (that is, having fun and feeling free). When Baloo returns, he finds that Magee is gone and the airfield and flight school look abandoned. Baloo learns that Magee had died twenty years earlier and realizes that he had been helped by Magee's spirit.
- Doctor Cooper (voiced by Alan Young) is a tortoise doctor whom Joe Magee told Baloo to go and get in order to treat Magee's supposedly injured leg in the episode "The Old Man and the Sea Duck". Cooper is the one who later informs Baloo of the truth about Magee's life.
- Rick Sky (voiced by Simon Templeman) is an ace fighter pilot who speaks with a British accent and appears in the episode "Bygones". Captain Rick Sky was the leader of the legendary "Squadron of Seven" who fought in the Great War, which ended 20 years prior. Initially believed dead, Baloo later discovers that Sky survived after finding him adrift at sea.
- Cool Hands Luke (voiced by Ron Feinberg) is a polar bear with a highly aggressive, chauvinistic, narcissistic, and apparently sociopathic attitude. His winning streak in the Air Scavenger Race (achieved through cheating) was broken when Rebecca and Baloo (in his "Tan-Margaret" persona) beat him and revealed him to be a fraud. Luke's name is a pun on the book and film Cool Hand Luke.
- Mr. Pomeroy (voiced by Alan Oppenheimer) is a bear who is the principal of Kit's grade school.
- Mrs. Morrissey (voiced by Susan Tolsky) is a bear who works as a teacher at Kit's grade school.
- Clementine Clevenger (voiced by Kath Soucie) is a cat with an American Southern accent. She is the unwitting secretary/court reporter/Girl Friday of the corrupt and self-appointed Sheriff Gomer in the small, Western frontier-type mining town of Boomstone. After catching the crooked lawmen and meeting the CEO, Clevenger becomes the new foreman of the urgonium mine. Clevenger appreciates Wildcat's gentleness, innocent sincerity and mechanical genius, with him having mutual feelings for her as well (calling her "Clem"), and they both fall in love.
- Sheriff Gomer (voiced by David Doyle) is a hog who works as a mine foreman in the mining town of Boomstone. With his deputy Wendell, he forces any passersby to work in the mines on trumped-up charges and even imprisons them. Baloo, Kit and Wildcat manage to stop Gomer and Wendell, who are forced to work in the mines.
  - Wendell (voiced by Frank Welker) is a wolf who is Gomer's deputy and accomplice.
- Wan Lo (voiced by Robert Ito) is the giant panda emperor of the city of Panda-La.
- Muffy and Buffy Vanderschmere (voiced by Linda Gary and Frank Welker respectively) are a fox con artist couple posing as rich, snobbish clients who trick Higher for Hire into transporting some supposedly valuable family jewels to Hyenasport, hoping to get the Sea Duck as collateral insurance in case of theft or loss of the jewelry.
- Broadcast Sally (voiced by Sheryl Bernstein) is a large, strong and sensual hippopotamus who works as a disc jockey at K-CAPE radio station in Cape Suzette. She is so popular that her broadcast range goes as far as Thembria, where her transmission is banned by law but is heard, regardless of the penalty that comes with it.
- Ralph Throgmorton (voiced by Ken Sansom) is an immaculately dressed coypu with round glasses who works as a flight instructor for FLAP (the Federal Licensing Agency for Pilots) in Cape Suzette. Uptight and humorless, he is extremely meticulous and does absolutely everything "alphabetically" (for example, he insists on having his car serviced by first having the Air in the tires checked, then the Brake fluid, then the Coolant, then the Dipstick, etc. in alphabetical order).
- Airplane Jane (voiced by Susan Silo) is a hippopotamus pilot who learned to fly from Baloo. Despite her show-offish attitude and often sneaky, competitive nature, she is ultimately kind and willing to help friends in need.
- Princess Grace (voiced by Victoria Carroll) is a white swan princess and first in line to the throne of the kingdom of Walla Walla Bing Bang. However, her right to the throne is challenged by her supposed long-lost cousin Prince Rudolf, and in order to prove her right to rule she must obtain the long-lost Ruby Wings. After Baloo and Airplane Jane retrieve the wings and bring them to her, she is crowned queen.
- Prince Rudolf (voiced by Dan Castellaneta) is a black swan who is supposedly second in line to the throne of the kingdom of Walla Walla Bing Bang and Princess Grace's long-lost cousin. In reality, Rudolf is a foreign imposter who intends to steal the throne.
- Captain William Stansbury (voiced by Peter Reneday) is a 19th-century lion sea captain who crashed his sailing ship a hundred years earlier onto what is now the island where Louie built his nightclub and whose ghost haunts when he is magically brought forth during a casual night of carousing. While Baloo and Louie are forced to do chores by the captain's magical power, they find a book of spells in the ship that will get rid of Stansbury and return everything back to normal. They then begin to exorcise the ghost by reading a spell from the book, but Rebecca intervenes before they can finish. Rebecca finishes off the spell, returning Stansbury to the spirit world.
- Crazy Edie (voiced by Billy Hayes) is a bird mechanic and con artist who sabotages airplanes in order to charge high prices to fix them, with the help of her four cute, furry gremlin-like creatures (voiced by Frank Welker) who are forced against their will to assist her. She controls them with special collars fitted around their necks which cause them to destroy/disassemble machines when exposed to a certain sound frequency. After encountering the creatures, Wildcat returns them to their home in the bayou.
- Hans and Helga (voiced by Stan Jones and Joan Gerber respectively) are the homicidal servants of the von Bruinwald Castle in Bearvaria who live to serve and kill the von Bruinwald family in order to gain the family's inheritance. They are stopped after Baloo fakes his death.
- Austin Featheridge (voiced by Ed Gilbert) is a bird who is the von Bruinwald family's lawyer and financial representative.
- O'Roarke (voiced by Jim Cummings) is a bull who tricks Baloo and Wildcat into taking him to a mysterious land of dinosaurs that come alive with the aid of a magical waterfall, presumably to start a touring business. In reality, O'Roarke intends to start a hunting business that targets the dinosaurs. To foil his plans, Wildcat shuts off the waterfall so as to hide the valley from the hunters leaving him at the mercy of the two hunters that he started to enlist. Due to the mechanic's good nature and feelings of wonder toward the prehistoric creatures, he secretly allows the waterfall to reopen.
- Nanuk (voiced by Jim Cummings) is a polar bear who is one of the customers of Baloo and Louie's "Pizza Pie in the Sky" pizza air delivery business.
- Bob (voiced by Jim Cummings) is a pelican fishmonger and owner of Bob's Discount House of Fish.
