= Janna Michaels =

American former child actress (born 1983)

- Born: 1983 (age 42–43)
- Occupations: actress, voice actress

Janna Michaels (born 1983) is an American former child actress. She is best known for voicing Molly Cunningham on Disney's TaleSpin.

Michaels was a regular on the short-lived television series, What a Dummy. She later had a recurring role on Dr. Quinn, Medicine Woman and played a young Kes in the Star Trek: Voyager episode "Before and After".

She also had roles in the family comedy films Little Giants (playing the child version of Susanna Thompson's character) and Bushwhacked. She then appeared as Sally Burrows in the 1996 TV movie If These Walls Could Talk.

Michaels was nominated for two Young Artist Awards, one for What a Dummy and another for TaleSpin. Michaels left acting behind following her fourth and final appearance on Dr. Quinn, Medicine Woman in 1997.
