= R. J. Williams =

American actor (born 1978)

- Born: Robert Jackson Williams; July 19, 1978 (age 48); Los Angeles, California, U.S.
- Education: Crossroads High School
- Alma mater: University of Southern California
- Occupations: Entrepreneur; producer; actor
- Years active: 1981–present
- Known for: Founder of Young Hollywood
- Website: www.arjayentertainment.com www.yhworldwide.com www.rjwilliamsonline.com

R. J. Williams (born July 19, 1978) is an American media and Internet entrepreneur, producer, and former child actor. He is the founder of the media company Young Hollywood.

== Early life and education ==
Williams was born in Los Angeles, California, United States in 1978. He was educated at the Crossroads School for Arts and Sciences in Santa Monica, and attended film school at the University of Southern California.

== Acting career ==
Williams began his career as a child actor, gaining recognition for his role as Rowdy on the soap opera General Hospital. His performance earned him the Young Artist Award for best Actor in a Daytime Series at the 12th annual Youth In Film Awards. Additionally he showcased his talents by portraying a young Thomas Magnum in the Emmy award-winning episode of Magnum, P.I., "Home from the Sea".

Throughout his career, Williams made guest appearances on several popular shows including Full House and Star Trek: The Next Generation, where he played Ian Andrew Troi, son of Counselor Deanna Troi in the Season 2 episode (The Child) He also had notable roles in Punky Brewster. and starred as C.B. in the 1984 Christmas movie The Night They Saved Christmas alongside Jaclyn Smith and Art Carney,

In the early 1990s, Williams expanded his talents to voice acting, lending his voice to a variety of animated characters. He voiced Kit Cloudkicker in the animated show TaleSpin, and Cavin in the final season of Disney's Adventures of the Gummi Bears. Additionally, he was the voice of the title cartoon bear Kissyfur, which premiered in 1986.

He also was the star of the 1990s syndicated children's TV show Wake, Rattle and Roll, a daily syndicated interview show that ran for 130 episodes. Once Wake, Rattle and Roll stopped producing episodes, Williams decided to take a hiatus from show business to attend both Crossroads High School and the film school at the University of Southern California (USC).

In 2004, Williams returned to the spotlight, shifting to hosting. He teamed up with Lance Bass of NSYNC to co-host a one-hour primetime pre-show for the American Music Awards with Dick Clark Productions and ABC. He has since made numerous hosting appearances on various shows produced by his own production company for networks like Showtime and Fox.

== Young Hollywood ==
Williams is the founder of Young Hollywood, a global digital video platform specializing in celebrity and lifestyle programming. The company creates and distributes celebrity and lifestyle programming globally; owns several leading entertainment brands, and licenses the Young Hollywood trademark internationally for a range of consumer products and services.

Young Hollywood has formed strategic partnerships with major digital platforms including Yahoo, Hulu, Google, and YouTube. Notably, YouTube selected Young Hollywood as a partner for its first-ever live streaming initiative, which launched with appearances by skateboarder Tony Hawk, comedian Dane Cook, and Jackass star Steve-O.

Young Hollywood collaborated with Google to launch the Young Hollywood Network (YHN). As part of YouTube's $100 million content initiative, Young Hollywood played a key role in developing premium digital programming.

In June 2012, Williams was featured in a BBC World News cover story highlighting this initiative and Young Hollywood's impact. The Young Hollywood Network has become a "barker channel" for other new YouTube channels—like a Leno for the YouTube set introducing audiences to other YouTube stars.

In recent years, Young Hollywood has partnered with tech giants such as Apple, Samsung, Roku, Amazon, and Microsoft. Williams also announced the launch of Young Hollywood TV, a streaming network tailored to millennial audiences, focused on celebrity-driven content. The network produces more than 500 original hours of exclusive programming annually. Plans were also announced to expand into several new content verticals including reality and scripted programming and to heavily invest in their own IP, as well as work with outside talent and creators, to continue to expand content offerings.

In 2010, Williams partnered with the Four Seasons Hotel to establish full time broadcast studios at its properties across the globe with the first one launching in Beverly Hills, California.

== Media career ==
Williams works closely advising several brands including Coca-Cola, Samsung, AT&T, Unilever, Subway, Rayban, Intuit and Electronic Arts on content production, product integration, experiential marketing and maximizing their social reach. He is known for paving the way by being one of the first to utilize new technologies such as what he did with programmatic advertising and creating PMP’S

Williams has been profiled in media such as Wall Street Journal, Forbes, Ad Week, Ad Age, BBC World News, USA Today and was named to The Hollywood Reporter Power 50 list joining the top execs from such places as Facebook, Twitter, Hulu, YouTube and Netflix. It was said that "Everything Young Hollywood Founder and CEO RJ Williams does is counterintuitive and effective" Fast Company recently included Williams on their list of "today's most innovative business thought leaders" joining Starbucks CEO Howard Schultz, Foursquare CEO Dennis Crowley, Zynga CEO Mark Pincus, Legendary CEO Thomas Tull, and Tumblr CEO David Karp.

Williams is represented by the Creative Artists Agency.

=== Producing ===
After graduation from USC, Williams formed a production company, Arjay Productions which focused on celebrity and lifestyle programming. Between 2003 and 2006, his company went on to produce multiple specials and series that were distributed by Showtime Networks. Williams was the creator, host and executive producer of these shows.
