= Larry Latham (animator) =

American animator and film director

Larry Latham (April 15, 1953 – November 2, 2014) was an American animator, storyboard artist, character designer, writer, voice actor, producer and director. He was perhaps best known as a producer and director on Disney's animated series TaleSpin, the pilot episode of which earned him a Primetime Emmy Award for Outstanding Animated Program.

Latham worked on several other Disney productions as a storyboard artist or designer, including Disney's Adventures of the Gummi Bears, Chip 'n Dale Rescue Rangers, and DuckTales the Movie: Treasure of the Lost Lamp. He was also a producer, director, co-creator and storyboard artist on Disney's Bonkers.

Latham also directed storyboards on numerous Hanna-Barbera cartoons, including Super Friends, Scooby-Doo and Scrappy-Doo, and The Smurfs. For Marvel Productions, he was storyboard director on My Little Pony 'n Friends and Spider-Man.

In 1996, Latham received a nomination for a Daytime Emmy Award for his work as a storyboard artist on The Tick.

More recently, Latham worked on several direct-to-video features for Universal Cartoon Studios. Among these were An American Tail: The Treasure of Manhattan Island and An American Tail: The Mystery of the Night Monster, both of which he produced and directed.

In 2008, Latham began writing, drawing and publishing a webcomic called Lovecraft is Missing, a project inspired by the works of H. P. Lovecraft and originally conceived by Latham as an animated series. He released the first pages on October 1, 2008, and kept the comic going until his death from cancer on November 2, 2014.
