= Robert Taylor (animator) =

American animator and film director

- Born: 1944; Boston, Massachusetts
- Died: December 11, 2014 (aged 69–70); Woodland Hills, California
- Occupations: Animator, film director, writer, television producer
- Children: 5

Robert Taylor (1944 – December 11, 2014) was an American Primetime Emmy Award-winning animator, writer, producer and film director. He is best remembered for his satirical film The Nine Lives of Fritz the Cat (1974), a sequel to Ralph Bakshi's Fritz the Cat (1972). At the time, this sequel flopped at the box office, but it later gained a cult following.

Taylor's credits include such films and television series as The Nine Lives of Fritz the Cat, The Flintstone Kids, It's Flashbeagle, Charlie Brown, Challenge of the GoBots, Challenge of the Superfriends, Bonkers, Goof Troop, Aladdin and the King of Thieves, TaleSpin and Heidi's Song.

He died in Woodland Hills, California on December 11, 2014, from complications due to COPD.
