= Beauty and the Beast Live on Stage =

Live show at Disney's Hollywood Studios theme park in Orlando

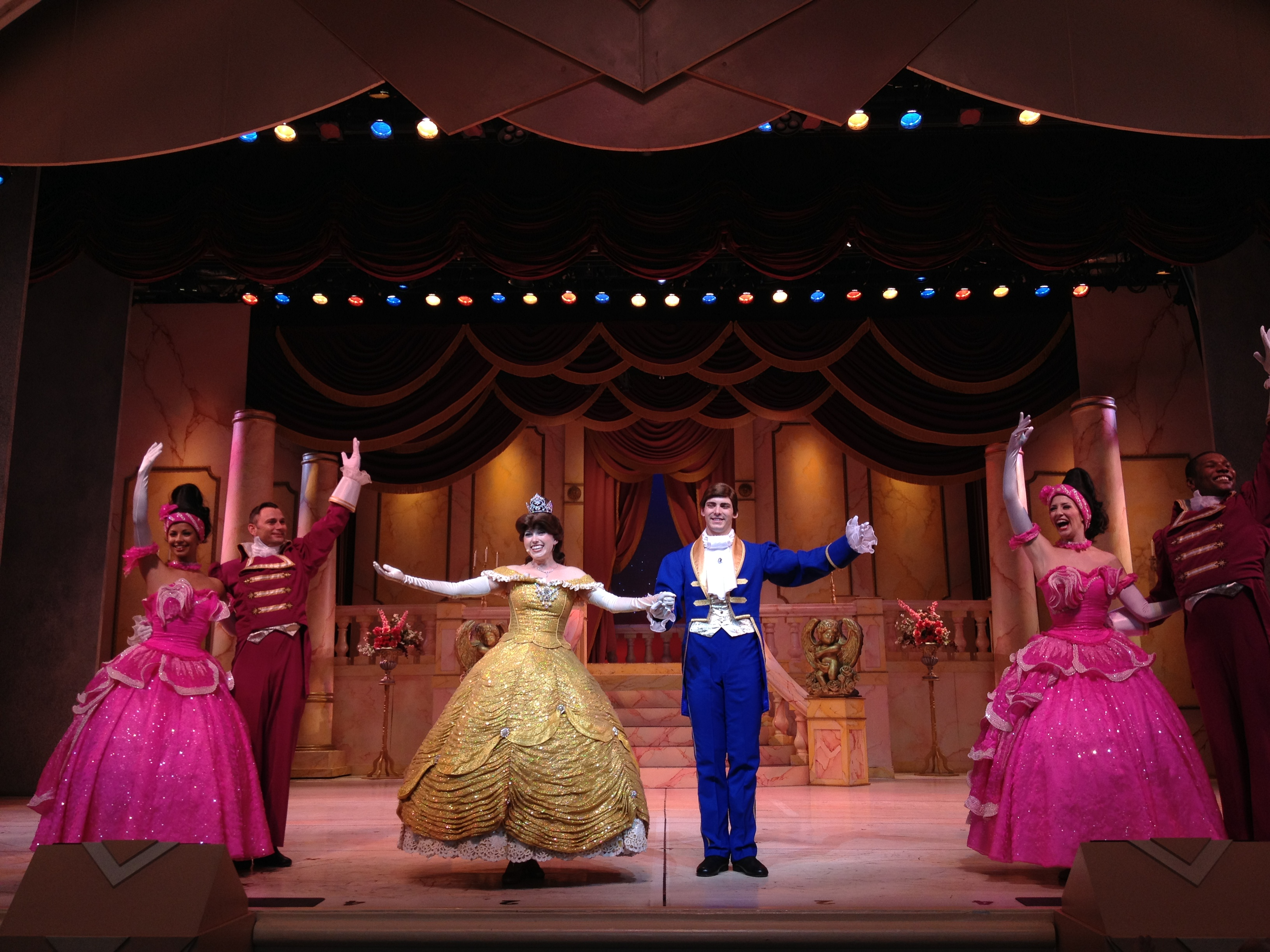
- Final bow of the show

Disney's Hollywood Studios
- Area: Hollywood Boulevard (1991–93); Sunset Boulevard (1994–2020, 2021–Present)
- Status: Operating
- Opening date: November 22, 1991 (original version); August 15, 2021 (updated version)
- Closing date: March 12, 2020 (original version)
- Replaced: Disney Society Orchestra and Friends (2020)
- Replaced by: Hollywood's Pretty Woman (1991); Disney Society Orchestra and Friends (2020)

Ride statistics
- Attraction type: Live show
- Model: Amphitheater
- Theme: Beauty and the Beast
- Music: Alan Menken (music), Howard Ashman (lyrics) & Alan Menken (score)
- Lightning Lane available
- Wheelchair accessible
- Assistive listening available

Beauty and the Beast: Live on Stage is a Broadway-style musical at the Theater of the Stars, on Sunset Boulevard, at Disney's Hollywood Studios, Walt Disney World. It is based on Disney's 1991 animated feature film Beauty and the Beast and opened on November 22, 1991, the same day the film was released. Two versions of the show have been presented since opening day.

Because of the COVID-19 pandemic, on August 2, 2020 a new show, Disney Society Orchestra and Friends, performed on the Theater of the Stars stage. On August 15, 2021, the Beauty and the Beast show reopened, with some modifications to the staging and choreography to account for the health and safety of the performers. Since then, the show has reverted to its pre-COVID, fully-staged format.

A third version of the show, titled Beauty and the Beast: A Musical Spectacular, premiered on the Disney Cruise Line ship Disney Treasure in 2025.

== Voice Cast ==
- Robby Benson - Beast / Prince
- Jerry Orbach - Lumiere
- David Ogden Stiers - Cogsworth / Narrator
- Angela Lansbury - Mrs. Potts
- Bradley Pierce - Chip

== Summary ==
The original version opened on November 22, 1991, the same day the film was released. When the Theater of the Stars was moved in September 1993 (to make room for the construction of Sunset Boulevard), the show was temporarily moved to the Premiere Theater on New York Street. The show reopened on July 15, 1994, in the now-covered and newly rebuilt Theater of the Stars on Sunset Boulevard.

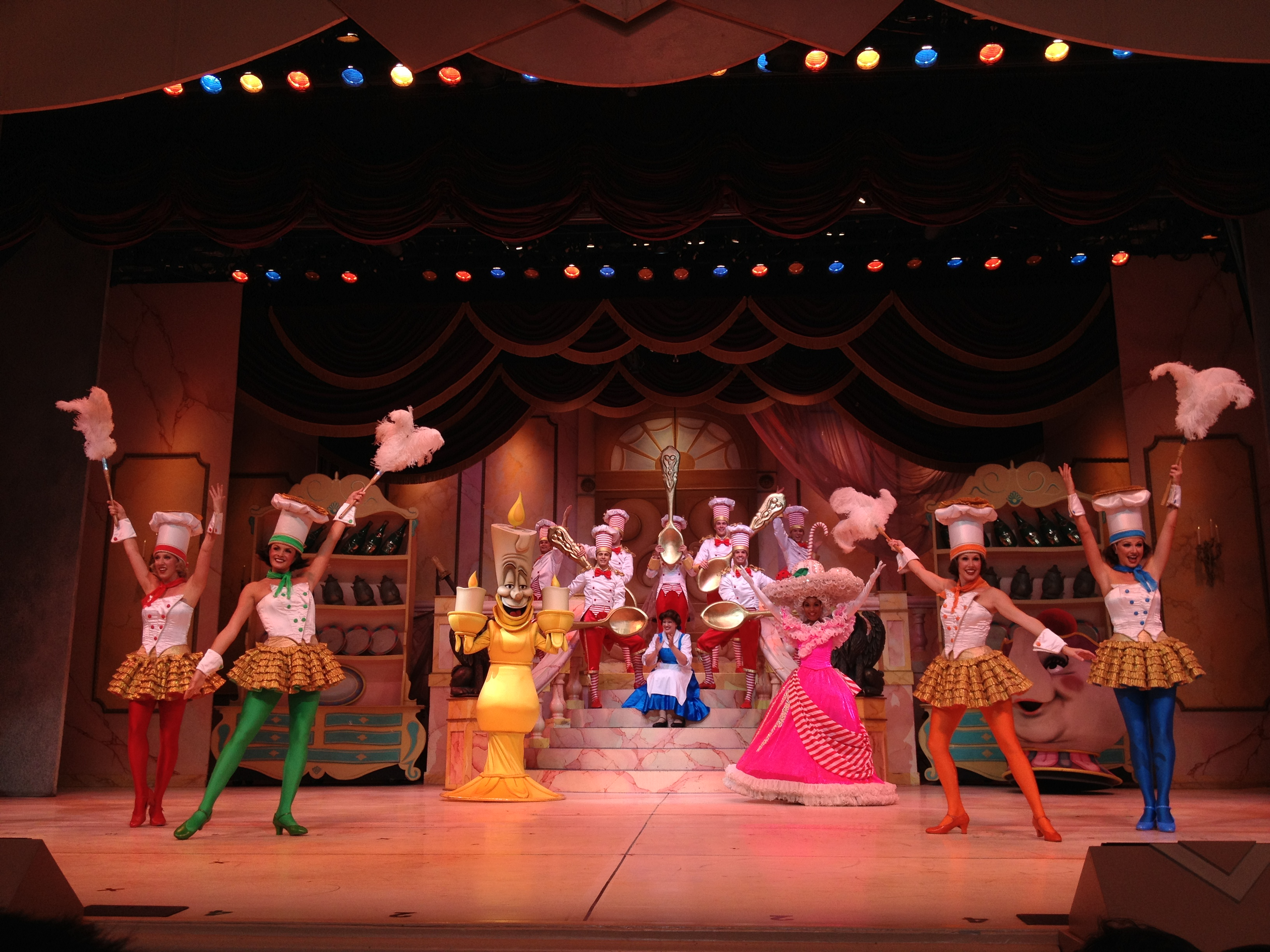
"Be Our Guest"

The stage show changed considerably from the original version to the currently running version, causing it to more closely resemble the 1991 film of the same name. However, because the show is condensed to approximately 25 minutes, many cuts and edits are made. Also, while most of the soundtrack is pre-recorded, the actors playing Belle and Gaston are the only two that have live dialogue and singing parts.

The show opens like the Broadway musical. An old beggar woman asks a spoiled and selfish prince if he will allow her to stay in his castle for the night from the bitter cold, in exchange for a single rose; to which the prince turns her away. Because his heart is cold, the old beggar woman punishes the prince by transforming him in to an ugly, scary, and hideous Beast. Everyone in the castle gets a punishing transformation as well. The prince can only break the spell by learning to love another, and earning their love in return, and failure to do so will doom him to "remain a beast for all time".

Years later, Belle is walking in the quiet little French village where she lives. The other villagers agree that Belle is beautiful, but she is also no ordinary character. Gaston, the handsome young hunter of the town, boasts how he loves Belle and asks her to marry him ("Belle"/"Gaston") and she politely refuses. Soon though, "under a series of mysterious circumstances", Belle finds herself inside the Beast's enchanted castle. She is confronted by the magical castle inhabitants, Cogsworth the clock, Lumiere the candelabra, Mrs. Potts the teapot, and her son, Chip the teacup. Cogsworth thinks that they made a mistake by allowing Belle inside, but the others believe she could be the one to break the curse. So they throw her a feast and, simultaneously invite her to dinner ("Be Our Guest"). The Beast abruptly ends the celebration and expresses his fear that Belle could never learn to love him. Belle, on a tour through the castle, enters the West Wing and discovers the rose. The Beast is furious at Belle, because he told her never to enter that part of the castle. All of this causes Belle and the Beast to argue. But the others advise Beast to be a gentleman, because Belle could be the one to break the curse. The castle's inhabitants discover that there could be a romance not seen before in Beast ("Something There"), and the two fall in love.

Meanwhile, Gaston declares that Belle has rejected him for the last time. He convinces the villagers that the Beast is a monster, and the village is not safe until he is dead. So they decide to kill him ("The Mob Song"). The townspeople take over the castle, ruining everything in sight. Gaston fights the Beast, and Belle appears just to see Gaston stab the Beast. Seeing the Beast dying, Belle admits she loves him just as the rose's last petal falls. This breaks the curse, and the Beast is magically transformed back into the Prince. The entire cast returns for a final dance, and declare that the love of "Beauty and the Beast" will thrive forever. Instantly, Belle and the Prince reappear in their traditional costumes ("Beauty and the Beast"). At the curtain call, Belle and the Prince will give away a rose to an audience member.

== Setlist ==
=== Original (1991–2001) ===
1. "Be Our Guest"
2. "Belle"/"Gaston"
3. "Something There"
4. "The Mob Song"
5. "Beauty and the Beast"

=== Current (2001–present) ===
The second version of the show debuted in March 2001 and features the songs arranged in a similar order in which they are presented in the film. It is currently the longest-running stage show at any Disney theme park.

1. "Prologue: The Enchantress"
2. "Belle"/"Gaston"
3. "Belle (Reprise)"
4. "Be Our Guest"
5. "Something There"
6. "The Mob Song"
7. "Beauty and the Beast"
8. "Beauty and the Beast", performed by Celine Dion and Peabo Bryson (exit music)

== Television appearances ==
- The show was featured on The Oprah Winfrey Show in an episode where Oprah goes to Disney World; a performance of "Beauty and the Beast" by Celine Dion and Peabo Bryson was featured and characters such as Belle, The Prince, Chip, Mrs. Potts, Lumiere and Cogsworth also appeared.
- Excerpts from the show were shown during the Walt Disney World Christmas Day Parade in 1991, when the show first premiered.
- The cast appeared on the Walt Disney World Christmas Day Parade in 2005, featuring John O'Hurley singing "Be Our Guest" with the cast.

== List of handprints in forecourt ==
- Steve Allen
- Morey Amsterdam
- John Astin (August 26, 1989)
- Imogene Coca
- Tim Conway (November 26, 1991)
- Bob Denver (October 15, 1989)
- James Doohan (July 3, 1989)
- Lou Ferrigno (April 18, 1990)
- Peter Graves (October 2, 1993)
- Monty Hall (June 14, 1990)
- Valerie Harper and her daughter, Cristina (December 4, 1992)
- Woody Harrelson (April 6, 1992)
- Sherman Hemsley (May 23, 1989)
- Florence Henderson
- Howard Hesseman (September 17, 1993)
- David Leisure (July 7, 1990)
- June Lockhart (November 26, 1991)
- Howie Mandel (February 2, 1990)
- Jayne Meadows
- Martin Mull (June 7, 1989)
- Fess Parker (November 29, 1992)
- Tom Poston (June 24, 1990)
- Charlotte Rae (August 28, 1990)
- McLean Stevenson (December 19, 1989)
- Loretta Swit (May 28, 1989)
- Meshach Taylor (October 4, 1991)
- Alex Trebek (November 15, 1992)
- Ben Vereen (November 3, 1992)
- George Wendt (August 31, 1990)
- Vanna White (March 24, 1992)

== 2020 labor dispute ==
When Walt Disney World reopened in July 2020 following the COVID-19 shutdown, all stage shows such as Finding Nemo – The Musical, Beauty and the Beast Live on Stage, Festival of the Lion King, and the Indiana Jones Epic Stunt Spectacular! remained closed due to a dispute between the Actors' Equity Association and Walt Disney World over allowing performers to wear face masks and providing regular testing.

== Disney's Jollywood Nights ==
On November 12, 2023, Disney's Hollywood Studios announced that a new show, Disney Holidays in Hollywood, featuring the voices of Matt Vogel, Eric Jacobson, Bret Iwan and Kaitlyn Robrock as Kermit the Frog, Miss Piggy, Mickey Mouse and Minnie Mouse, would take place in the evenings at Theatre of the Stars, during a new holiday event, Disney's Jollywood Nights. This is part of The Walt Disney Company's 100th Anniversary celebration, and the Beauty and the Beast show will continue its regular schedule during the holidays.
