= Beauty and the Beast (1991 soundtrack) =

Beauty and the Beast: Original Motion Picture Soundtrack
- Artwork by John Alvin

Soundtrack album by Various Artists
- Released: October 22, 1991 (original release)
- Recorded: 1989–1991
- Studios: BMG Recording, New York; Evergreen Studios, Los Angeles; Sony Studios, Culver City
- Genres: Film score; pop
- Length: 50:12 (1991 release)
- Label: Walt Disney
- Producers: Howard Ashman, Alan Menken, Walter Afanasieff

Singles from Beauty and the Beast: Original Motion Picture Soundtrack
- 1. "Beauty and the Beast" Released: November 25, 1991

Beauty and the Beast: Original Motion Picture Soundtrack is the official soundtrack album to the 1991 Disney animated film Beauty and the Beast. Originally released on October 22, 1991, by Walt Disney Records, the album's first half – tracks 2 to 9 – generally contains the film's musical numbers, all of which were written by composer Alan Menken and lyricist Howard Ashman, while its latter half – tracks 10 to 14 – features its musical score, composed solely by Menken. While the majority of the album's content remains within the musical theatre genre, its songs have also been influenced by French, classical, pop and Broadway music. Credited to Various Artists, Beauty and the Beast: Original Motion Picture Soundtrack features performances by the film's main cast – Paige O'Hara, Richard White, Jesse Corti, Jerry Orbach, Angela Lansbury, Robby Benson and David Ogden Stiers – in order of appearance. Additionally, the album features recording artists Celine Dion and Peabo Bryson, who perform a pop rendition of the film's theme song of the same name, which simultaneously serves as the soundtrack's only single.

Following a difficult period during where Walt Disney Feature Animation struggled to release successful animated feature films, the studio, inspired by their most recent animated success The Little Mermaid (1989), decided to adapt the fairy tale "Beauty and the Beast" into an animated musical film after a non-musical adaptation had been attempted that failed to impress Jeffrey Katzenberg, the chairman of Walt Disney Studios. Katzenberg ordered that production on the film be started over from scratch, hiring songwriting team Howard Ashman and Alan Menken, who had just recently completed scoring The Little Mermaid, to write the film's songs. Dion and Bryson were hired to record a pop version of – and draw media attention to – the film's title song. Ashman, who was initially hesitant to join the project, died of AIDS before the film's completion and the album's release.

Like the film, the soundtrack was a massive critical success, receiving universal praise and recognition from both film and music critics. The music featured on the album won several awards, including the Golden Globe Award for Best Original Score, the Academy Award for Best Original Score and the Grammy Award for Best Instrumental Composition Written for a Motion Picture or for Television. Its title track and only single, "Beauty and the Beast", achieved similar success, winning the Golden Globe Award for Best Original Song, Academy Award for Best Original Song and Grammy Awards for both Best Song Written for Visual Media and Best Pop Performance by a Duo or Group with Vocals. The soundtrack was also nominated for a Grammy Award for Album of the Year.

On December 18, 2001, the soundtrack was re-released as a Special Edition to coincide with the IMAX re-issue of the film and the upcoming two-disc Platinum Edition. The new release featured the film version of "Transformation", which had been replaced with an early unused version in some early pressings, the newly animated song "Human Again", the original instrumental intended for the "Transformation" scene (titled "Death of the Beast (Early Version)" here) and demos for "Be Our Guest" and the title track. On September 14, 2010, the soundtrack was re-released again as a Diamond Edition soundtrack; to coincide with the successful Blu-ray and DVD Diamond Edition release of the film, the 1991 version of the soundtrack was released and included Jordin Sparks' cover of "Beauty and the Beast" as a bonus track. The soundtrack was reissued as the fourteenth entry in The Legacy Collection on February 9, 2018, and includes previously unreleased score.

== Background ==
During the 1970s and 1980s, Walt Disney Feature Animation struggled to release animated feature films that achieved the levels of success that some of the studio's earlier productions did. In 1989, Walt Disney Pictures released The Little Mermaid. An animated musical that features songs written by lyricist Howard Ashman (who is also the film's producer) and composer Alan Menken, The Little Mermaid was both a tremendous critical and commercial success. Hoping to release a film that achieved similar success, the studio decided to adapt the fairy tale "Beauty and the Beast" by Jeanne-Marie Le Prince de Beaumont into an animated film.

Prior to getting professionally involved with Disney, Ashman and Menken had collaborated on a musical adaptation of Little Shop of Horrors and its subsequent musical film adaptation. Following the studio's attempt to adapt the fairy tale into a non-musical animated film under the direction of Richard Purdum, Disney CEO Jeffrey Katzenberg, dissatisfied by the direction in which the film was headed, ordered that it be scrapped and restarted from scratch, this time in the form of a musical. In addition to hiring a screenwriter, Katzenberg recruited Ashman and Menken to write the film's songs.

=== Ashman's failing health ===
Ashman was initially reluctant to agree to work on Beauty and the Beast because he had just recently been diagnosed with AIDS. Additionally, he had already begun writing songs for Aladdin (1992). Ashman's health began deteriorating soon after he completed The Little Mermaid. However, he wanted his illness to remain secret and decided to tell few about it. Too weak to travel, Ashman requested that he be allowed to work on the film's songs from his home, causing Menken and the filmmakers to frequently travel from the film's studio in Burbank, California to his home in New York in order to collaborate with him. Ashman wrote the majority of the song's lyrics from his deathbed.

== Content and composition ==
Lyricist Howard Ashman and composer Alan Menken intended for the songs in Beauty and the Beast to serve as plot devices and assist in the telling of its story. According to Menken, the film's songs grew out of the fact that the film was written to "almost ... exist as a stage musical." Stylistically, Ashman and Menken drew creative influence from several musical styles and genres, including French, classical and Broadway music, using them as reference and inspiration when composing the film's songs. Menken also revealed that the film's songs and score tend to convey a wide variety of emotions, ranging from poignancy to humor and joy.

While composing the orchestral score that accompanies the film's prologue, Menken was inspired by the French suite The Carnival of the Animals by Camille Saint-Saëns, referring to it as his own version of Saint-Saëns' composition. Menken believes that all properly structured musicals should feature an "I Want" song because they are essentially "about a character having a big dream, then [there's] some obstacle to that quest." "Belle", the film's opening number, is an "orchestra-driven", "snare-tapping" song. Accompanied by a full orchestra, it is considered Beauty and the Beast's "I Want" song. Musically, Menken based "Belle" on the narrative style of a traditional operetta, describing it as "something to portray Belle in a world that is so protected and safe." Menken described the film's following musical number, "Gaston", as a hilarious "drinking song sung by basically a group of Neanderthal level guys in praise of a complete lug-head", referring to Ashman's choice of song lyrics as humorous and "tongue in cheek".

When it came time to write the film's large-scale "scintillating" musical number "Be Our Guest", Menken originally composed and provided Ashman with a simple melody that was initially intended for temporary use only, simply for the purpose of allowing his co-writer to start developing the song's lyrics. He labeled the rough composition "the dummy". However, Menken eventually gave up on his attempt to improve upon the song's simple melody, and it ultimately became the version to which Ashman wrote his lyrics. Menken described "Be Our Guest" as a song that is both "simple and tuneful" that "let[s] the lyric shine."

Originally, Ashman and Menken had written a rather lengthy, large-scale musical number for the film called "Human Again". However, when it was deemed "too ambitious", they swiftly wrote and replaced it with a smaller-scale musical number entitled "Something There". According to Menken, the film's theme and title song, "Beauty and the Beast", was "a very hard song to come by" despite its relative simplicity. He revealed that the writing process for "Beauty and the Beast" was the longest period of time that he had ever devoted to one particular song. Written to resemble a lullaby, Ashman and Menken conceived "Beauty and the Beast" as "a song that could have a life outside the movie." The film's final musical number, "The Mob Song", was written as what Menken described as "a macho adventure underscore".

=== Single ===
When the film was released, it garnered three separate Academy Award nominations for Best Original Song for "Belle", "Be Our Guest" and "Beauty and the Beast". Producer Don Hahn expressed concern that this would cause confusion among audiences and voters, and potentially result in an unfavorable tie. In order to prevent this from happening, the studio fought in favor of the film's title song and decided to release a pop rendition of "Beauty and the Beast" as a commercial single in an attempt to persuade voters to vote for it. When "Beauty and the Beast" was written, it was composed with the potential of having "half a life outside the movie." Menken revealed that this was the first time one of his compositions had been rearranged and "turned into ear candy".

Menken recruited musician Robbie Buchanan to arrange "Beauty and the Beast" into the form of a pop duet while Walter Afanasieff was responsible for producing the track. Afanasieff also assisted Buchanan in the arranging of the song. Menken was ultimately pleased with Afanasieff's production, explaining, "Walter Afanasieff ... took it and really molded it into something very different than I ever intended and I grew to love it. In a way, Walter made it his own, and I love that." Because Disney could not afford to hire a "big singer", they drafted Canadian singer Celine Dion, who was relatively new to the music industry at the time, to record "Beauty and the Beast". However, the studio feared that she would not draw much media attention because of her relative obscurity in the United States, so they hired American singer Peabo Bryson, who was a more well-known recording artist at the time, to perform alongside her. The newly arranged song was released as the album's lead single on November 25, 1991.

== Reception ==
=== Critical response ===
Professional ratings
Review scores
| Source | Rating |
|---|---|
| Allmusic | 4.5/5 stars |
| Filmtracks | 5/5 stars |
| Sputnikmusic | 4.5/5 |

Similar to the overwhelmingly positive critical response that the film received, Beauty and the Beast: Original Motion Picture Soundtrack was met with universal acclaim from both music and film critics, garnering nearly unanimous praise for both its songs and score. Tavia Hobart of AllMusic awarded the soundtrack a nearly perfect overall score of 4.5/5 stars, describing Ashman and Menken's compositions as "positively delightful." However, she felt that the album's orchestral score was not as good as The Little Mermaid. Filmtracks was very enthusiastic about the album, praising each of its songs and labeling them "remarkably upbeat". The reviewer also praised Ashman and Menken for avoiding "stupid comedic performances to appeal to children." Unlike AllMusic's opinion, the reviewer felt that the score was "a vast improvement" over The Little Mermaid's. Sputnikmusik's Irving Tan awarded the album a "superb" overall rating of 4.5/5. Praising the film's entire collection of songs in a detailed review, Tan accredited the overall appeal of the soundtrack with much the film's success.

When Beauty and the Beast was released in November 1991, several film and entertainment critics awarded specific praise to its music, both songs and score. Entertainment Weekly's Lisa Schwarzbaum wrote, "The songs unleash a chemical reaction of happiness."

The soundtrack became the first (and so far, the only) animated film to receive a Grammy nomination for Album of the Year. The pop version of the title track "Beauty and the Beast" also received Grammy nominations for Record of the Year and Song of the Year. In total, the soundtrack won five Grammys for Best Album for Children and Best Instrumental Composition Written for a Motion Picture or for Television for the soundtrack, and Best Pop Performance by a Duo or Group with Vocals (Celine Dion & Peabo Bryson), Best Pop Instrumental Performance, and Best Song Written for Visual Media for "Beauty and the Beast".

== Track listing ==
In the movie, track eight comes after track nine.

All lyrics are written by Howard Ashman; all music is composed by Alan Menken.

| No. | Title | Recording artist(s) | Length |
|---|---|---|---|
| 1. | "Prologue" (Score) (Includes narration by David Ogden Stiers) | | 2:26 |
| 2. | "Belle" (^{[A]}) | Paige O'Hara, Richard White, Chorus | 5:09 |
| 3. | "Belle" (Reprise) | O'Hara | 1:05 |
| 4. | "Gaston" | Jesse Corti, White, Chorus | 3:40 |
| 5. | "Gaston" (Reprise) | Corti, White, Chorus | 2:04 |
| 6. | "Be Our Guest" (^{[A]}) | Angela Lansbury, Jerry Orbach, Chorus | 3:44 |
| 7. | "Something There" | Lansbury, Stiers, Orbach, O'Hara, Robby Benson | 2:19 |
| 8. | "The Mob Song" | White, Chorus | 3:30 |
| 9. | "Beauty and the Beast" (^{[B]}) | Lansbury | 2:46 |
| 10. | "To the Fair" (Score) | | 1:58 |
| 11. | "West Wing" (Score) | | 3:42 |
| 12. | "The Beast Lets Belle Go" (Score) | | 2:22 |
| 13. | "Battle on the Tower" (Score) | | 5:29 |
| 14. | "Transformation" (Score) | | 5:47 |
| 15. | "Beauty and the Beast" (Duet) (^{[B]}) | Céline Dion & Peabo Bryson | 4:04 |
| Total length: | | | 50:12 |

2010 Bonus Track
| No. | Title | Recording artist(s) | Length |
|---|---|---|---|
| 16. | "Beauty and the Beast" (^{[C]}) | Jordin Sparks | 3:14 |
| Total length: | | | 53:26 |

2001 Special Edition
| No. | Title | Recording artist(s) | Length |
|---|---|---|---|
| 1. | "Prologue" (Score) (Narration by Stiers) | | 2:26 |
| 2. | "Belle" | O'Hara, White, Chorus | 5:09 |
| 3. | "Belle" (Reprise) | O'Hara | 1:05 |
| 4. | "Gaston" | Corti, White, Chorus | 3:40 |
| 5. | "Gaston" (Reprise) | Corti, White, Chorus | 2:04 |
| 6. | "Be Our Guest" | Lansbury, Orbach, Chorus | 3:44 |
| 7. | "Something There" | Lansbury, Stiers, Orbach, O'Hara, Benson | 2:19 |
| 8. | "Human Again" (Previously Unreleased) (^{[D]}) | Lansbury, Stiers, Orbach, Jo Anne Worley, Chorus | 4:54 |
| 9. | "The Mob Song" | White, Chorus | 3:30 |
| 10. | "Beauty and the Beast" | Lansbury | 2:46 |
| 11. | "To the Fair" (Score) | | 1:58 |
| 12. | "West Wing" (Score) | | 3:42 |
| 13. | "The Beast Lets Belle Go" (Score) | | 2:22 |
| 14. | "Battle on the Tower" (Score) | | 5:29 |
| 15. | "Transformation" (Score) | | 5:47 |
| 16. | "Be Our Guest" (Demo) (Previously Unreleased) | Ashman | 3:29 |
| 17. | "Beauty and the Beast" (Work Tape & Demo) (Previously Unreleased) | Menken & Ashman | 3:58 |
| 18. | "Beauty and the Beast" | Dion & Bryson | 4:04 |
| 19. | "Death of the Beast" (Score) (Early Version) (^{[E]}) | | 1:29 |
| Total length: | | | 1:04:43 |

=== Notes ===
- A Nominated for the Academy Award for Best Original Song.
- B Won an Academy Award for Best Original Song.
- C Produced by Robert Buchanan.
- D New song integrated into the film for the 2001 Special Edition IMAX re-issue and 2001 DVD release.
- E Integrated into the film's end credits for the 2001 Special Edition IMAX re-issue and 2002 DVD release. On initial pressings of the original release of the soundtrack, this cue replaced the version used in the film up until the moment when the transformation begins. Eventually the album was re-pressed with the film version of the cue and has been presented in its proper film version on the 2001 and 2010 reissues.

== Charts ==
| Chart (1991–2017) | Peak position |
|---|---|
| Australian Albums (ARIA) | 14 |
| Canada Top Albums/CDs (RPM) | 50 |
| Irish Albums (IRMA) | 28 |
| Dutch Albums (Album Top 100) | 25 |
| New Zealand Albums (RMNZ) | 21 |
| Spanish Albums (Promusicae) | 95 |
| US Billboard 200 | 19 |
| US Soundtrack Albums (Billboard) | 9 |

== Certifications ==
| Region | Certification | Certified units/sales |
|---|---|---|
| Australia (ARIA) | Gold | 35,000^{^} |
| Canada (Music Canada) | Platinum | 100,000^{^} |
| Germany (BVMI) | Gold | 250,000^{‡} |
| Japan (RIAJ) | Gold | 100,000^{^} |
| Spain (Promusicae) | Platinum | 100,000^{^} |
| United Kingdom (BPI) | Silver | 60,000^{^} |
| United States (RIAA) | 3× Platinum | 3,000,000^{^} |
^{^} Shipments figures based on certification alone.^{‡} Sales+streaming figures based on certification alone.

== The Legacy Collection release ==
Walt Disney Records released a two-disc soundtrack album of Beauty and the Beast as part of The Legacy Collection. It includes the complete score and early demos.

== See also ==
- The Music Behind the Magic
- Beauty and the Beast (2017 soundtrack)
