= Be Our Guest =

Song from Disney's Beauty and the Beast

Song by Jerry Orbach, Angela Lansbury, and Chorus

from the album Beauty and the Beast: Original Motion Picture Soundtrack
- Released: October 29, 1991
- Genre: Show tune
- Length: 3:44
- Label: Walt Disney
- Composer: Alan Menken
- Lyricist: Howard Ashman
- Producers: Howard Ashman; Alan Menken

"Be Our Guest" is a song written by lyricist Howard Ashman and composer Alan Menken for Walt Disney Pictures' animated film Beauty and the Beast (1991). Recorded by American actor Jerry Orbach, English actress Angela Lansbury, and the additional voice acting choir of the 1991 animated film. "Be Our Guest" is a large-scale Broadway-inspired musical number that takes place during the first half of Beauty and the Beast, performed by the castle's staff of enchanted objects in an elaborate attempt to welcome Belle. The song had originally been intended for Belle's father Maurice. However, "Be Our Guest" had to be entirely re-written as the story evolved in order to return its focus to Belle.

"Be Our Guest" has garnered universal acclaim from both film and music critics who, in addition to dubbing the song a show-stopper, praised its catchiness and Orbach's vocal performance while applauding the scene's unprecedented use of computer-generated imagery. "Be Our Guest" has since been extolled as one of Disney's greatest and most iconic songs. The song received nominations for both the Golden Globe and Academy Awards for Best Original Song, being performed by Orbach live at the 64th Academy Awards, ultimately losing both to the film's title song. "Be Our Guest" has been ranked highly on several "best Disney song" countdown lists, garnering recognition from IGN, M and the American Film Institute. Disney has further used the song in the Broadway musical adaptation and the 2017 live-action remake of Beauty and the Beast. The song's title was used for the Be Our Guest Restaurant at the Magic Kingdom, and as a tagline for promoting the 2017 film. The song has been parodied in an episode of The Simpsons and the film South Park: Bigger, Longer and Uncut.

== Background ==
Be Our Guest
30 second excerpt of the song Be Our Guest.

Originally, Beauty and the Beast, under the direction of Richard Purdum, was not intended to be a musical. Then-studio chief Jeffrey Katzenberg decided to turn the film into a Broadway-style musical similar to The Little Mermaid (1989), Disney's previous animated film, after he, displeased with the film's initial story reel, ordered the film scrapped and restarted from scratch. As a result, Purdum resigned, and first-time feature film directors Kirk Wise and Gary Trousdale replaced him.

Following the Academy Award-winning success of The Little Mermaid, Katzenberg asked The Little Mermaid songwriting duo of Howard Ashman and Alan Menken to write the songs for and score Beauty and the Beast. At first Ashman, who was at the time writing songs with Menken for a recently pitched idea for another Disney film called Aladdin (1992), was reluctant to join the struggling film project, but eventually agreed.

Musically, "Be Our Guest" is based on a simple melody that was composed by Menken, who initially had little intention of using it as anything more than just a "dummy." Upon singing the tune and presenting it to co-writer Ashman, Menken discovered that he was unable to come up with a melody capable of surpassing "that dumb piece of music that I wrote initially because it was just right." Subsequently, Ashman wrote the song's lyrics.

Originally, the filmmakers had initially intended for "Be Our Guest" to be performed by Lumière to Belle's disoriented father Maurice when the character first discovers the Beast's castle. According to co-director Gary Trousdale, "The song had already been recorded and the sequence partially animated when we decided that it would be more meaningful if it was directed towards Belle" because "she is one of the two main characters and the story revolves around her coming to the castle." Consequently, the song had to be re-written and the entire scene re-animated. Trousdale explained, "We had to bring Jerry Orbach and all the other vocal talents back into the studio to change all references to gender that appeared in the original recording."

== Context, scene, and analysis ==
Beauty and the Beast's fourth musical number, "Be Our Guest" is set within the first half of the film, occurring shortly after Belle sacrifices her own freedom in return for her father's, becoming the Beast's prisoner. Confined to her bedroom when she, upset, stubbornly refuses to join the Beast for dinner, Belle eventually ventures into the kitchen after feeling hungry, where she is greeted by the castle's staff of enchanted inanimate objects – Mrs. Potts, Cogsworth and Lumière. Upon insisting that they treat her more like a guest than a prisoner, Lumière decides to go against the Beast's orders and invites Belle to dinner. A "food chorus line," "Be Our Guest" is "a rollicking invitation to Belle from the castle staff." As one of the film's most poignant, large-scale, "all-stops-pulled production number[s]," the scene features "dancing plates and other fanciful dinner guests" as they "perform for Belle, hoping to make her stay a little more comfortable." As the film's heroine, Belle is served a meal in the form of "a Broadway-quality stage show." Commonly regarded as the "show-stopper" of Beauty and the Beast, the sequence both visually and musically "derive[s its] insatiable energy and excitement from the gradual accumulation of participation." The Washington Post observed that "'Be Our Guest'" involves "the household gadgets enjoin[ing] Belle to live with them," comparing it heavily to the song "Under the Sea" from Disney's The Little Mermaid (1989), which was also written by Menken and Ashman. Longing to be human, servant and maître d' Lumière is also of the impression that he is worth nothing unless he serves, singing,"Life is so unnerving/For a servant who's not serving."

"Cogsworth nor Mrs. Potts can really hold a candle to Lumière, who makes out with a pretty feather duster and later sings the show stopper 'Be Our Guest' in his entertainingly thick Gallic accent. The number - which is staged like a Busby Berkeley production, complete with rows of dancing table settings - is the closest thing in Beauty and the Beast to the bubbly 'Under the Sea' extravaganza in The Little Mermaid."
— Jay Boyar, the Orlando Sentinel.

In terms of character development, "Be Our Guest introduces both Belle and audiences to Lumière's "musical expertise." Additionally, the energetic and flamboyant way in which Lumiere, a suave, French-accented candelabra, is personified and portrayed throughout "Be Our Guest" has often been likened to French entertainer Maurice Chevalier. The Washington Post commented, "The model for Lumiere seems to have been Maurice Chevalier, and the idea is so choice, and so deftly executed, that it places him immediately among the top rank of Disney characters." American actor and singer Jerry Orbach, who provided the voice of Lumiere, himself admitted to People that the character was very much him doing a deliberate impersonation of Chevalier.

Described as both a "musical montage" and the "magical set piece" of Beauty and the Beast, "Be Our Guest" is "a big production number featuring dancing cutlery." Analyzing the scene's complex, elaborate choreography, film critics have observed the profound influence that American filmmaker and choreographer Busby Berkeley has had on "Be Our Guest", deeming its lively "Busby Berkeley-style choreography" both "joyous and charming" while commenting, "Without the confines of camera range, there are virtually no limits to how spectacular an animated Berkeley scene can be ... most notably ... 'Be Our Guest'." David Kronke of Amazon.com hailed the song itself as "an inspired Busby Berkeley homage." Similarly, the Dance Films Association wrote, "the 'Be Our Guest' number features practically all of the techniques employed by Berkeley in his musical comedies," while The New York Times called "Be Our Guest" a "Busby Berkeley-style number in which Belle is serenaded by furniture and dishes." Film critic Roger Ebert joked that the "Be Our Guest" choreography resembles "Busby Berkeley running amok." Additionally, Jerry Griswold, author of The Meanings of "Beauty and the Beast": A Handbook, observed several similarities between "Be Our Guest" and a scene from Maurice Sendak and Carole King's musical Really Rosie.

Significantly, Beauty and the Beast was one of Disney's earliest feature-length animated films to fully employ computer-generated imagery and technology, utilizing it to a significant extent, as depicted throughout its signature musical numbers "Be Our Guest" and "Beauty and the Beast." Significantly, "Be Our Guest" "marks the debut of the [Pixar Image Computer] system that is featured in the ballroom dance sequence and 'Be Our Guest'." Due to its elaborateness, the sequence has been noted for "tak[ing] full advantage of the advantages of animation."

== Music and lyrics ==
"Be Our Guest" is, according to the song's official sheet music, a Broadway musical-inspired song. Another inspiration for the song is a minor theme from Gustav Mahler's Third Symphony, occurring in both the first and third movements, which the Disney song copied nearly note for note as the main theme. An energetic, "turbo-charged Broadway chorus number," "Be Our Guest" was written in common time at a "free" tempo of 50 beats per minute, spanning a length of three minutes and forty-four seconds. In "Be Our Guest," Orbach's "low" tenor or baritone vocal range spans roughly three octaves, from the low note of F_{2} to the high note of D♭_{5}. Described as a "scintillating," "jolly," "lavish and bouncy" song, "Be Our Guest" is, according to TV Guide, a "boisterous" number, comparing it to songs from the Broadway musicals Hello, Dolly! and Mame. Musically, the song, according to Film.com, has a total of four key changes and modulations, beginning slowly and "gradually build[ing] ... to a thunderous, bring-the-house-down climax."

Additionally described as "a spark of Gallic vaudeville that lights a flame to both [entertainers] Maurice Chevalier and Yves Montand," "Be Our Guest" depicts both "fun" and "humour." Extending a warm, energetic invitation towards Belle, the first verse of the song is preceded by a spoken introduction. It reads, at first in French, "Ma chere Mademoiselle, it is with deepest pride and greatest pleasure that we welcome you tonight. And now we invite you to relax, let us pull up a chair as the dining room proudly presents: your dinner," immediately succeeded by the sung lyrics "Be our guest, be our guest, put our service to the test," continuing with "Go on, unfold your menu / take a glance and then you'll / be our guest / oui, our guest / be our guest." A nostalgic Lumiere muses about being human, pining for the "good old days when we were useful." Furthermore, Lumiere voices his need to serve, singing, "Life is so unnerving/For a servant who's not serving."

== Reception ==
=== Critical response ===
"Be Our Guest" has been universally lauded, receiving widespread critical acclaim and garnering nearly unanimously positive reviews from both film and music critics. Hailing it as a "crowd-pleasing production number," TV Guide drew similarities between "Be Our Guest" and songs from the Broadway musicals Hello, Dolly! and Mame. The Globe and Mail's Jennie Punter called the song "show-stopping." Similarly, Drew Taylor of Indiewire echoed Punter's statement, writing, "when the enchanted wait staff dazzle the captive Belle, assuring her that she's not a prisoner she's a guest of the castle," the result is ultimately "show-stopping." Writing for the Austin Chronicle, Kathleen Maher, who generally panned the film's songs and musical numbers, liked "Be Our Guest", describing it as Beauty and the Beast's "only ... magical set piece." Ranking Beauty and the Beast: Original Motion Picture Soundtrack as Disney's greatest soundtrack, Moviefone's Sandie Angulo Chen highlighted "Be Our Guest", noting its "infectious quality" while hailing it as an "amazing food chorus line." JoBlo.com wrote that "Be Our Guest" is both "eye-popping" and "impossibly catchy." Orbach's performance as Lumiere has also garnered significant praise. Filmtracks.com commented, "the ever popular 'Be Our Guest' ... flourish[es] due to a spirited lead performance by Jerry Orbach." Similarly, Hollywood.com cited in the website's biography of the actor, "Among the highlights of [Beauty and the Beast] was Orbach's delivery of the showstopping number 'Be Our Guest'."

'Be Our Guest,' the lavish production number that is a dry-land answer to 'Under the Sea' from The Little Mermaid, may not have the identical calypso charm, but it has just about everything else, including Busby Berkeley-style choreography carried out by dancing silverware ... This demonstrates Mr. Ashman's gifts as an outstandingly nimble lyricist.

— The New York Times' Janet Maslin.

Several critics have awarded specific praise to "Be Our Guest"'s choreography, comparing it extensively to the work of director and choreographer Busby Berkeley. In addition to hailing "Be Our Guest" as "delightful," Candice Russel of the Sun-Sentinel wrote, "In setting the table for Belle, Lumiere and friends concoct a Busby Berkeley song-and-dance extravaganza." The Deseret News' Chris Hicks described "the Busby Berkeley-style 'Be Our Guest'" as "first-rate." Lisa Schwarzbaum of Entertainment Weekly highlighted the scene, writing, "The set pieces are narcotically pleasing, especially the Busby Berkeley-style dancing-kitchenware spectacular, 'Be Our Guest'." James Berardinelli of ReelViews coined "'Be Our Guest' ... the animated equivalent of Broadway show-stoppers, with all the energy and audacity of something choreographed by Busby Berkeley." Calling it a "wonderful musical number," Roger Ebert enthused, "'Be Our Guest' is a rollicking invitation to Belle from the castle staff, choreographed like Busby Berkeley running amok." In review of the 2011 3D re-release of Beauty and the Beast, Stephen Whitty of The Star-Ledger commented, "The illusion of depth does add more life to the enchanted housewares — particularly the 'Be Our Guest' number, with its Busby Berkeley geometrics."

While Beauty and the Beast's several theatrical re-releases and reissues have been met with generally mixed reviews, critical response towards the "Be Our Guest" musical sequence has remained predominantly positive. Reviewing the 2001 IMAX re-release of the film, the Los Angeles Times' Charles Solomon felt that the inclusion of the deleted song "Human Again" was unnecessary, preferring "Be Our Guest" and writing, "a second major production number simply isn't needed; 'Be Our Guest' is sufficient." Similarly, the Seattle Post-Intelligencer's William Arnold wrote, "On the other hand, it's understandable why ["Human Again"] was cut from the original. It's almost too similar to the film's show-stopper, 'Be Our Guest'." Reviewing the film's 2012 3D conversion, Todd Gilchrist of Boxoffice wrote that "Be Our Guest" is "effective, immersive and maybe even memorable." Meanwhile, Annlee Ellingson of Paste wrote, "It's thrilling to experience this film's major set pieces on the big screen again, especially the Broadway-infused 'Be Our Guest' number." The Times-Picayune's Mike Scott wrote, "But then the 3-D all but disappears until the 'Be Our Guest' number -- with its artfully surreal dance of the dishes." Andrew Pulver of The Guardian, who otherwise criticized the film's songs, praised "Be Our Guest", writing, "Apart from the spectacular Busby Berkeleyesque [']Be Our Guest['], the film pretty much grinds to a halt whenever one of the songs ... starts up." Likewise, Neil Smith of Total Film concluded that "only 'Be Our Guest' and the ballroom swoop really benefit from a stereoscopic make-over that doesn't do the hand-drawn remainder many favours."

Although vastly critically acclaimed, the song did receive some minor criticism. Lukewarmly, Irving Tan of Sputnikmusic commented, "numbers like 'Be Our Guest' provides evidence that Lumiere and co. are infinitely preferable as entertaining flatware." On Lansbury's performance, Tan joked, "The singer's delightfully personable contribution is almost reason enough to forgive Disney for thinking her English accent ... would not look out of place in a film set in 18th century France." A more negative review was written by Pete Vonder Haar of The Houston Press. Observing that Beauty and the Beast "was Disney's first stab at incorporating computer animation," he felt that "the results are, now, pretty primitive," concluding, "I recall thinking the dancing forks during 'Be Our Guest' ... looked pretty bad and time has not been kind." The song has also been compared to "Under the Sea" from The Little Mermaid, most of which have been mixed. Jay Boyar the Orlando Sentinel opined, "'Be Our Guest' ... is the closest thing in Beauty and the Beast to the bubbly 'Under the Sea' extravaganza in The Little Mermaid," while Entertainment Weekly's Owen Gleiberman's review was much more negative, describing the song as "merely serviceable" and concluding, 'Be Our Guest,' ... sorry to say, is no 'Under the Sea'." Likewise, Desson Howe of The Washington Post panned both the song and Lumiere, writing, "the Candelabrum's Maurice Chevalier accent is clearly intended to substitute for the Caribbean-lilted lobster in Mermaid. And the ensemble song, 'Be Our Guest,' in which the household gadgets enjoin Belle to live with them, is an obvious attempt to reprise a similar Mermaid number, 'Under the Sea.' But it's just under par."

=== Awards, accolades and legacy ===
Alongside the songs "Beauty and the Beast" and "Belle," "Be Our Guest" was nominated for the Academy Award for Best Original Song at the 64th Academy Awards in 1992. Having garnered three separate Academy Award nominations for Best Original Song, Beauty and the Beast became the first film in the history of the Academy Awards to achieve this rare feat; this would not be repeated until The Lion King had three songs nominated for the award. Ultimately, "Be Our Guest" lost to the film's title song. In an interview with Entertainment Weekly, Beauty and the Beast producer Don Hahn revealed that Disney feared that having three songs nominated for Best Original Song would result in a draw or three-way tie. Therefore, while "Beauty and the Beast" received heavy promotion from the studio, significantly less was given to "Be Our Guest" and "Belle." "Be Our Guest" was nominated for the Golden Globe Award for Best Original Song at the 49th Golden Globe Awards in 1992, losing again to "Beauty and the Beast." In 2004, the American Film Institute nominated "Be Our Guest" for its "100 Years…100 Songs" ranking.

Dubbed one of the most memorable songs from Beauty and the Beast, while lauded as a "favorite," a "classic" and "one of the greatest showstoppers" in film history, "Be Our Guest" is commonly cited as one of Disney's greatest songs. As Beauty and the Beast's "most frequently heard song," BuzzSugar ranked "Be Our Guest" third on the website's list of the "25 Disney Songs We Will Never Stop Singing". Calling the song a "gem," author Maggie Pehanick wrote that "Be Our Guest" was "one of the first [Disney] songs to get permanently lodged in your brain." Oh No They Didn't ranked "Be Our Guest" eighth on its list of "The Top 25 Disney Songs of All Time", while IGN ranked the song third, with author Lucy O'Brien writing, "Of all the brilliant numbers peppered throughout Beauty and the Beast, it's the turbo-charged Broadway chorus number [']Be Our Guest['] that's the stand-out," describing it as "one of the best songs ever devised by Alan Menken and Howard Ashman." "Be Our Guest" was ranked seventh on M's "Top 20 Disney Songs of All Time" list, with author Stephanie Osmanski citing "Be our guest, be our guest, put our service to the test" as her favorite lyrics. Meanwhile, HitFix ranked "Be Our Guest" sixth on their own list o "The 20 Best Disney Songs of All Time." Additionally, while ranking Lumiere the thirty-ninth "Best Animated Movie Character" of all-time, Empire hailed "Be Our Guest" as the character's best moment and "Stroke of genius," writing, "The song ... sees Lumiere introduce perhaps the greatest dining experience in animation history." While ranking the "50 Greatest Fairy Tale Movies," on which Beauty and the Beast ranked second, Total Film highlighted "Be Our Guest" as the film's "Most Magical Moment." Film.com ranked "Be Our Guest" the thirteenth "Greatest Musical Number ... in Movie History," describing the song as "a masterpiece of showtune construction" while lauding its Busby Berkeley-inspired choreography. "Be Our Guest" was the only animated musical number included on the website's list of 50.

==== Certifications ====
Region	Certification	Certified units/sales
United Kingdom (BPI)	Gold	400,000^{‡}
United States (RIAA)	Platinum	1,000,000^{‡}
^{‡} Sales+streaming figures based on certification alone.

== Live performances ==
In 1992, Jerry Orbach performed "Be Our Guest" at the 64th Academy Awards.

== Cultural impact ==
=== Covers and parodies ===
In The Simpsons sixth-season episode "Two Dozen and One Greyhounds" (1995), "Be Our Guest" is parodied by the character Mr. Burns when he performs the song "See My Vest". New York magazine-run website Vulture.com ranked the song eighth on its list of "The Ten Best Simpsons Songs". An Oscar-themed rendition of the song was performed by Seth MacFarlane at the 85th Academy Awards. In 2013, English television personalities Ant & Dec appeared in a Christmas television advertisement for the supermarket Morrisons. In the minute-long commercial, a computer-animated gingerbread man named Ginger serenades Ant & Dec to the tune of "Be Our Guest," inviting them to enjoy the store's products. The 2015 Disney Channel Original Movie Descendants includes a remix version of the song, sung by Mitchell Hope in the role of Ben, son of Belle and Beast. In 2020, the song was parodied under the name "Wear a Mask", a song that tells people how to defend themselves from the COVID-19 pandemic and lampoons criticisms from politicians and "mask debaters", all in the style of the 1991 animated film featuring Lumière and his appliances. In September 2025, The Late Show with Stephen Colbert parodied the song after Disney suspended Jimmy Kimmel Live!

=== Broadway musical ===
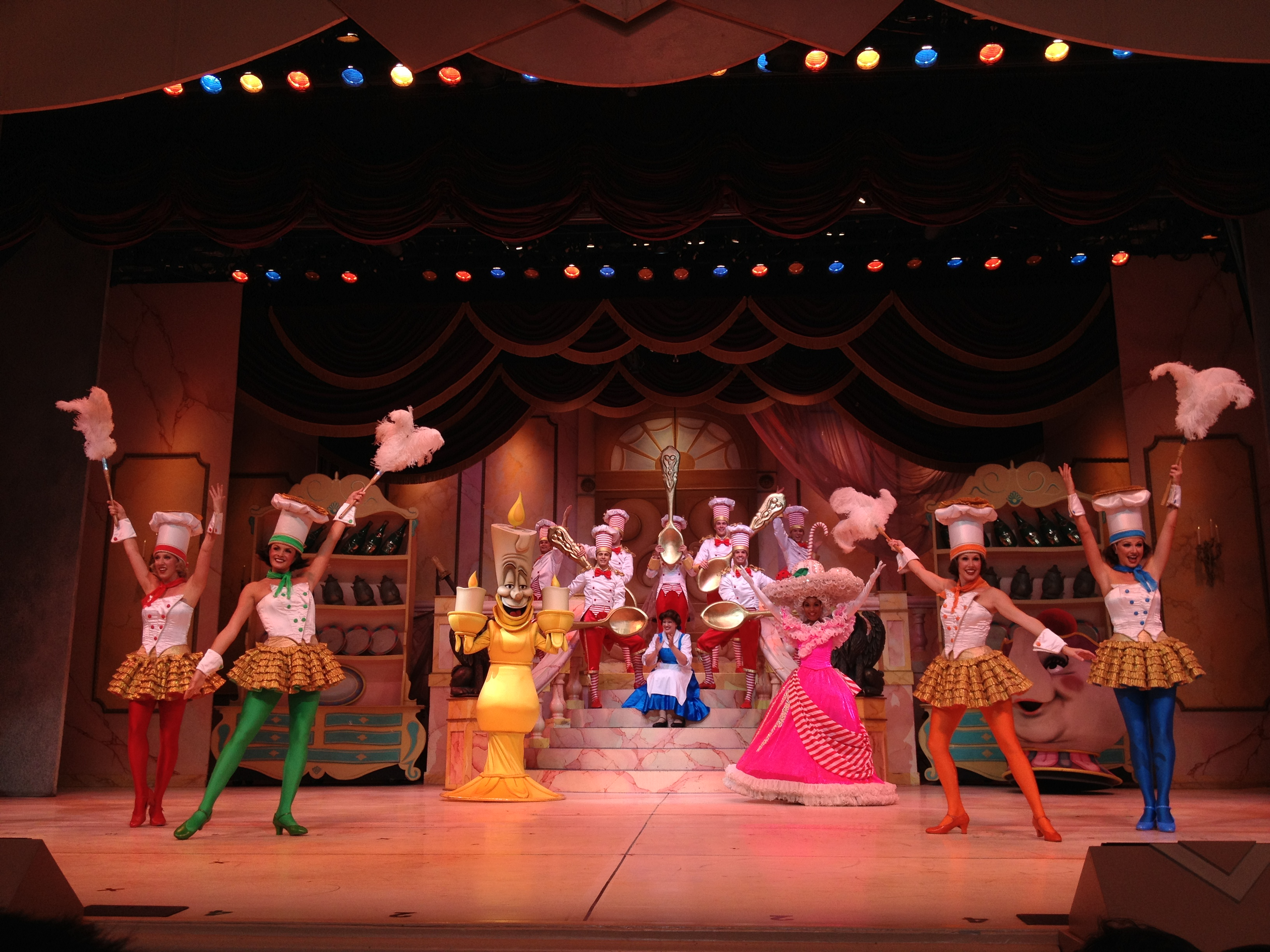
"Be Our Guest" performed at Walt Disney World's Beauty and the Beast Live on Stage, distinct from the Broadway production, in September 2012.

"Be Our Guest" was also featured as an elaborate production number in the Broadway musical adaptation of Beauty and the Beast, which ran from 1994 to 2007. Originally performed by American actors Gary Beach and Beth Fowler, who originated the roles of Lumiere and Mrs. Potts, respectively, "Be Our Guest" was "a spectacular dance of illuminated saucers, showgirls bedecked with spinning plates, and giant-size bottles spewing streams of brilliant sparkles." In addition to "performance[s] by eye-catching cutlery, plates, a tablecloth and napkins," the musical number featured "a show-stopping routine [from] a dancing doormat." When the Broadway production transferred to the Lunt-Fontanne Theatre in 1999, they also incorporated confetti and streamer cannons that erupt at the end.

Reception towards the Broadway treatment of "Be Our Guest" has been generally mixed. While some theatre critics, such as Alex Bentley of CultureMap, felt that "Be Our Guest" "remain[s] as timeless as ever," The Christian Science Monitor's Karen Campbell criticized the number's lavishness, feeling that it compromised the story Campbell wrote, "Only in the fantastical 'Be Our Guest' number ... does the show's extraordinary technological magic threaten to derail the story line." However, some critics did positively comment on the fact that the Broadway adaptation of "Be Our Guest" was more than simply a "cookie-cutter" carbon copy rendition of the original version featured in the animated film.

=== Live-action film ===
"Be Our Guest" is featured in the 2017 live-action adaptation of Beauty and the Beast. In addition, the phrase "Be Our Guest" became the tagline in promotional trailers and posters for the film. The song is performed primarily by Ewan McGregor, with contributions from Emma Thompson, Gugu Mbatha-Raw, and Ian McKellen. This version is very similar to the animated film, except that Lumiere sings "Too long we've been rusting" where he sang "Ten years" in the original, as well as when Lumiere sings "We'll prepare and serve with flair a culinary cabaret," there is a musical nod to Kander & Ebb's 1966 musical Cabaret's "signature, campy, percussive sound."
