= Something There =

1991 song from Disney's Beauty and the Beast

Song by Paige O'Hara and Robby Benson featuring Jerry Orbach, Angela Lansbury and David Ogden Stiers

from the album Beauty and the Beast: Original Motion Picture Soundtrack
- Released: October 29, 1991
- Length: 2:18
- Label: Walt Disney
- Composer: Alan Menken
- Lyricist: Howard Ashman
- Producers: Howard Ashman; Alan Menken

"Something There" is a song written by lyricist Howard Ashman and composer Alan Menken for Walt Disney Pictures animated film Beauty and the Beast (1991). Sung by the majority of the film's main cast, the song was recorded by American actors Paige O'Hara as Belle and Robby Benson as the Beast via voice over, featuring actors Jerry Orbach, Angela Lansbury and David Ogden Stiers as Lumiere, Mrs. Potts and Cogsworth, respectively. The only song performed by the Beast, "Something There" is heard midway through Beauty and the Beast during a scene in which Belle and the Beast finally begin to acknowledge their romantic feelings for each other.

A last-minute addition to the film, the simple love song was quickly written by Ashman and Menken to replace the more elaborate and ambitious "Human Again" after the latter was cut from Beauty and the Beast. O'Hara based her own vocal performance on that of American singer and actress Barbra Streisand, whom Ashman advised the actress to impersonate, while O'Hara herself convinced the songwriters to have Benson record the song. Critical reception towards "Something There" has been positive, with film and music critics alike praising Ashman's abilities as both a songwriter and a storyteller.

== Background ==
"Something There" was written by lyricist Howard Ashman and composer Alan Menken. According to Menken, "Something There" was written as "a very quick replacement for ... 'Human Again'," the latter of which was ultimately cut from Beauty and the Beast because it was considered "too ambitious" for the film. Eleven minutes in length, producer Don Hahn explained that the song was cut because "We just couldn't figure out how to make it work and not take away from the central story of Belle." Upon learning that "Human Again" was removed from Beauty and the Beast, Ashman and Menken were forced to return "to the drawing board to write something more contained and simple," the ultimate result of which was the love song "Something There," which has been described as "shorter and more direct" than "Human Again". The creative team had originally believed that the Beast saving Belle from the wolves was enough to justify the dance sequence near the end of the film, though later realised they had in fact not yet earned this moment; this quiet song where Beast gives Belle his library was pitched and written by Howard Ashman and "as soon as that was written, we knew the movie was going to work".

In his biography I'm Not Dead... Yet!, actor Robby Benson, voice of the Beast, revealed that it was co-star Paige O'Hara's idea to have Benson's character duet with O'Hara's Belle in "Something There". According to Benson, the actress "explained to Ashman and Menken that [Benson] had made records and sang in Broadway musicals." O'Hara briefly struggled to record one of the song's lines – "a bit alarming" – to which an ailing Ashman, who was forced to communicate with O'Hara and the studio via telephone from his hospital bed in New York due to his illness, simply responded "Streisand." By this, Ashman meant that he wanted O'Hara to impersonate singer and actress Barbra Streisand, and by doing so O'Hara finally recorded the song successfully. "Something There" was recorded by O'Hara and Benson accompanied by a live orchestra.

== Context, sequence and analysis ==
In the book The Meanings of "Beauty and the Beast": A Handbook, author Jerry Griswold observed that the "Something There" musical sequence is preceded by "the once feisty Belle ... bandaging and nursing [the Beast]" after he rescues her from the wolves. Contextually, the purpose of the song has been identified as "Dramatizing [Belle and the Beasts'] partnership." Leading up to the musical sequence, the Beast first "surprises Belle by showing her his library and then they learn to eat together." Author Robin O. Winter observed that "During the scene they begin to see beneath their outer appearances and start to appreciate each other's inner qualities," while one critic identified this as one of the scenes in "which Belle and the Beast hesitantly slowly open up to one another." Writing for Wesleyan University, Rachel Anne Silverman observed that "Something There" depicts "The first time Belle and the Beast's attraction is introduced," describing the couple's relationship as "a passion that has developed over time." Initially, Belle is alarmed "as she realizes her growing love for the Beast," briefly hiding behind a tree as she sings. According to the Hal Leonard Corporation and Music Theatre International, the castle's staff of enchanted objects also discover "something different between Belle and the Beast." "Something There" concludes with Belle and the Beast retreating to a fireplace and reading. In the original film, "Something There" immediately precedes the film's title song. However, for its special edition re-release, the song is immediately followed by the newly reinstated "Human Again".

Screenshot of the Beast and Belle finally realizing that they are beginning to fall in love with each other during the "Something There" musical sequence.

Identifying the song as "where the genius of music as storytelling kicks in," Simon Brew of Den of Geek felt that "Something There" is "the track with the heaviest workload." The author observed that "In two minutes and 19 seconds, [the song] gets across just how the position and feelings of the characters have changed." For instance, "At the beginning of 'Something There,' Belle admits that she thought the Beast was mean, coarse, and unrefined. By the end, she's feeling pretty smitten," according to Oh My Disney. The song also depicts the film's passing of time, while providing audiences with an opportunity "to appreciate Beast and first see the potential for Belle and him." On the song's role in the special edition version of the film, co-director Kirk Wise explained, "There's a ... little suite of music now that starts with 'Something There' ... which segues into 'Human Again' which gives the object perspective on what they hope for when [Belle and the Beast] fall in love and that transitions into 'Beauty and the Beast' the ballad, which is the culmination of their relationship." Dubbing the song "soliloquies of Belle and the Beast," TV Guide drew comparisons between "Something There" and songs from the musical South Pacific.

The "Something There" musical sequence was added towards the end of Beauty and the Beast's filmmaking process. Belle was animated by Mark Henn, while the Beast was animated by Aaron Blaise. Henn described "Something There" as "a great sequence," continuing, "I love to animate songs." The Los Angeles Times' Charles Solomon felt that Belle was drawn inconsistently throughout the film, observing that the character appears "noticeably slimmer" during "Something There".

== Composition ==
Something There
Sample of "Something There".

Written in the key of D-flat major at a quick allegretto tempo of 108 beats per minute in common time, the "playful" "Something There" is a Broadway musical-inspired duet in which Belle and the Beast finally conclude that "there's something there that wasn't there before." The song spans a duration of two minutes and eighteen seconds, making it the third shortest song on the soundtrack behind the reprises of "Belle" and "Gaston", respectively. Describing "Something There" as "a fluffy song," Filmtracks.com observed that the song "shares many instrumental devices with 'Belle';" one of Belle's verses in "Something There" serves as "a reprise of the secondary phrase from ['Belle']". Combined, O'Hara and Benson's vocal ranges span two octaves, from the low note of A♭_{3} to the high note of E♭_{5}. The song, described as "a poignant character number" performed "Against a background of the easy rhythms of soft, lilting violins," "allowed [O'Hara and Benson] to blend their voices." In addition, Women's Studies in Communication observed that the "tentative bursts of notes symbolize the uncertainties of this new way of relating".

In the song's first verse, "Belle articulates how her attraction to [the Beast] stems from his shut-off demeanor," singing, "There's something sweet/And almost kind/But he was mean/And he was coarse and unrefined/But now he's dear/And so unsure/I wonder why I didn't see it there before." The Beast's verse reads, "when we touched she didn't shudder at my paw." According to Laurence E. MacDonald, author of the book The Invisible Art of Film Music: A Comprehensive History, Benson "shocked many filmgoers with his richly resonant baritone." Finally, Belle sings the song's bridge, which reads, "New and a bit alarming/Who'd have ever thought that this could be?/True, that he's no Prince Charming/But there's something in him that I simply didn't see." According to the Los Angeles Times, by the end of "Something There", "the audience understands what Belle and Beast feel and how disconcerting those emotions seem."

== Reception ==
"Something There" has garnered mostly positive reviews from film and music critics. Writing for Den of Geek, Simon Brew felt that "Something There" is "where the genius of music as storytelling kicks in." In Brew's opinion, the "utterly convincing and un-mawkish" song works "because the two characters aren't on screen singing directly at each other." Brew concluded, "Everyone who makes an animated film that has a love story at the heart should watch this." Filmtracks.com described "Something There" as an "affable" song. Particularly praising Ashman's songwriting, Charles Solomon of the Los Angeles Times wrote that "Ashman's songs advance the plot by exploring the characters' emotions and making story points more concisely than conventional exposition." Solomon concluded, "By the end of the deceptively simple-sounding 'Something There,' the audience understands what Belle and Beast feel and how disconcerting those emotions seem." O'Hara continues to cite "Something There" as her favorite of the film's songs, elaborating, "Every time I see the Beast with that grin on his face and the bird in his hand, my heart just melts."

For the studio's pending live-action adaptation of Beauty and the Beast, Julia Emmanuele of Hollywood.com suggested that the filmmakers "feel free to drop 'Something There' if there's no room for it" because "it won't be missed." However, when English actress Emma Watson confirmed in January 2015 that she will be portraying Belle via Facebook, she cited "Something There" as one of her favorite songs from her childhood. Irving Tan of Sputnikmusic jokingly called "Something There" "the closest the movie comes to admitting its horrendously inappropriate stance on human-animal sexual relations."

== Certifications ==
| Region | Certification | Certified units/sales |
|---|---|---|
| United States (RIAA) | Gold | 500,000^{‡} |
^{‡} Sales+streaming figures based on certification alone.
