= Belle (Disney song) =

Song by Paige O'Hara and Richard White

from the album Beauty and the Beast: Original Motion Picture Soundtrack
- Released: October 29, 1991
- Genre: Operetta
- Length: 5:09
- Label: Walt Disney
- Composer: Alan Menken
- Lyricist: Howard Ashman
- Producers: Ashman; Menken

"Belle" is a song written by lyricist Howard Ashman and composer Alan Menken for Disney's animated film Beauty and the Beast (1991). Recorded by American actors Paige O'Hara and Richard White, "Belle" is a mid-tempo classical music-inspired song that borrows elements from Broadway and musical theatre. It was the first song Ashman and Menken wrote for Beauty and the Beast, which they feared Disney would reject due to its length and complexity; however, the film's producers ultimately accepted the idea of an opening song for the film.

The film's first song and opening number, "Belle" appears during Beauty and the Beast as a bustling operetta-style musical number that introduces audiences to the film's heroine, Belle (O'Hara), and her arrogant suitor, Gaston (White). In addition to describing Belle's goals and aspirations, the song uses lyrics interspersed with spoken dialogue to reveal how the townsfolk feel about her and Gaston, positioning the former as an outcast due to her beauty and love of reading, and the latter as a hero despite his arrogance. Belle reprises the song later in the film after rejecting a marriage proposal from Gaston, declaring her deep longing for adventure.

"Belle" has received widespread acclaim from film and music critics, who praised its effectiveness as an opening number and likened it to songs from the musical films West Side Story (1961) and The Sound of Music (1965). "Belle" was nominated for the Academy Award for Best Original Song at the 64th Academy Awards in 1992, but lost to the film's title song. "Belle" was similarly featured in the stage adaptation of the film, originally performed by actress Susan Egan on Broadway. Actors Emma Watson and Luke Evans performed the song in the 2017 live-action remake of the film.

== Background and writing ==
In an effort to replicate the unprecedented success of The Little Mermaid (1989), Disney decided to adapt the fairy tale "Beauty and the Beast" into a feature-length animated film. Although originally developed as an animated film without songs under the direction of Richard Purdum, Disney chairman Jeffrey Katzenberg was unsatisfied with the dark, somber direction of the film at the time, and ultimately ordered that it be re-written into a "Broadway-style musical with a strong heroine", similar to The Little Mermaid. Disney then hired The Little Mermaid's songwriters, lyricist Howard Ashman and composer Alan Menken, to write original songs for the revised film. The songwriting duo wrote "Belle". According to Menken, songs such as "Belle" developed naturally due to the fact that Beauty and the Beast was written in the style of a traditional Broadway musical. Actress and singer Paige O'Hara, who voices Belle, said the songwriters wanted to eschew the pop songs of The Little Mermaid in favor of a more Jerome Kern and Rodgers and Hammerstein-inspired score for Beauty and the Beast, which was heavily inspired by French, classical, and traditional Broadway music. Additionally, Menken described "Belle" and the other Beauty and the Beast songs as "tangents from 18th-century France", and Ashman suggested that the film's opening be "a full-fledged operetta".

"Belle" was the first song they wrote for the film, which Menken described as far more ambitious than anything Disney had asked them for. Hoping to craft a song that would portray Belle in a safe, protected environment, Ashman and Menken drew inspiration from operetta storytelling, using the opening song to establish the tone of the rest of the film. Written in a style Menken described as "very distant from contemporary pop", the songwriters were influenced by classical music, Mozart, and the stage musical She Loves Me (1963). Writing "Belle" much like how they would have written any song for the stage, Menken said the song occupies several roles in the film – simultaneously serving as an opening song, entertaining production number, and showing audiences the character they should be rooting for – and emphasized the importance of it happening early in the film to establish that Beauty and the Beast is a musical. Ashman's partner, Bill Lauch, recalled that he and Menken worked particularly hard on "Belle", explaining that story-wise it ultimately serves multiple purposes, including providing information about characters, offering a tour of the town, and aside from the Beast "pretty much introduces all the central characters that you're going to follow through the film".

Ashman and Menken were initially skeptical about "Belle"'s success upon completing the song, fearing it would end their Disney careers should the studio not like their creation. Estimating the completed song to be seven minutes long, the songwriters doubted the filmmakers would appreciate their very theatrical approach to animation. Actor Richard White agreed that, at the time, "No show of any kind starts with a seven-minute opening number that's all exposition". Ashman was particularly wary, avoiding submitting the song to Disney for several days. Menken claims Ashman's AIDS diagnosis contributed to the lyricist's emotional vulnerability during this time. The cassette tape the songwriters eventually sent to the producers also contained the demo for the reprise and "Be Our Guest". Much to their surprise, "Belle" was ultimately very well received by the creative team, becoming one of the film's few songs to remain largely unchanged during production. Ashman determined where characters would speak or sing during the song, similar to a choreographer choreographing a dance routine. Story supervisor Roger Allers requested more back-and-forth among the townspeople towards the end of the song, prompting Ashman and Menken to suggest several phrases and actions the characters could sing about. Menken played an electric piano while Ashman wrote dialogue. Their demo recording of "Belle" was included on the compilation album The Legacy Collection: Beauty and the Beast (2018). O'Hara called the song one of her favorites from the film because it establishes who Belle is as a character.

== Use in Beauty and the Beast ==
"Belle" is the first song in Beauty and the Beast. Described by the film's producer Don Hahn as Gilbert and Sullivan operetta-style, "Belle" reveals a significant amount of information within a relatively short period of time. According to Gizmodo's Germain Lussier, "Belle" serves as more than simply a song by establishing the film's setting, explaining its main character, foreshadowing the movie, and setting up one of the film's central conflicts, "all in mere minutes". Taking place shortly after the prologue, "Belle" helps progress the film to the present-day, with its title character walking through to return a book to the bookshop. According to Menken, the song relays "the story of Belle going to the town and everyone's reaction to her and getting to see Gaston and knowing he is infatuated with her – but more infatuated with himself". As Beauty and the Beast's opening number, "Belle" is a "pivotal moment...in the narrative", playing a significant role by introducing both the film's heroine and villain, Belle and Gaston, as well as where both characters are in their lives, establishing Belle as an outsider. The song also introduces the same townsfolk who would eventually hunt the Beast later in the film due to fearing the unknown.

Belle has grown frustrated with her predictable village life and longs for an adventure similar to the ones she reads about in her books, while Gaston is a narcissistic hunter determined to marry her because he believes they are the two best-looking residents. The sequence begins with Belle returning a library book about "a beanstalk and an ogre", in exchange for one she has already read several times. During the scene, Belle attempts to share the plot of her most recent novel with some villagers such as the Baker, only to be brushed off. In roughly five minutes, the song explains both Belle and Gaston's roles in Beauty and the Beast to the audience, offering insight into Belle's desire for "something more". Belle has grown bored of the feeling that every day seems to be the same to her. Ironically, Belle is unaware of the adventure she is about to embark on, or how her dreams would manifest. The song also voices the opinions of the townsfolk and "sets up the overall theme and foreshadows what makes the town so oppressive to [Belle]". While the villagers praise Belle for her beauty, they view her as "odd" because of her love of books, with their opinions of her ranging from open attraction to critical bewilderment. They remain fascinated by her despite their wariness of her. However, they idolize Gaston's looks and masculinity. Commonly referred to as the film's "I Want" song, "Belle" offers its protagonist an opportunity to convey her yearnings, specifically wanting more than the provincial life she has been living. Josh Spiegel of The A.V. Club observed that, like many other Beauty and the Beast songs, "Belle" spotlights the film's supporting cast. Commentators have offered theories suggesting that the book Belle is reading in the opening scenes is either Sleeping Beauty or foreshadowing her own story that eventually unfolds in Beauty and the Beast.

Belle reprises the song in a more defiant manner later in the film after rejecting Gaston's marriage proposal, which according to Dirk Libbey of CinemaBlend "captures all of Belle's dreams" in a manner the original version does not. The character explicitly wishes for "adventure in the great, wide somewhere", expressing her boredom with her current circumstances. O'Hara described it as the moment her character "wants to break loose out of this little town and explore the world—not looking for a man—just explore the world". Critics compared the scene to The Sound of Music (1965), which O'Hara confirmed they borrowed inspiration from. Nate Millado of Backstage cited inspiration from the musical Oklahoma! (1943) in the way the song " propels the plot and peeks into characters".

== Music and lyrics ==
Ashman wrote the song's lyrics while Menken composed its music. According to its official sheet music from Walt Disney Music Publishing, "Belle" is a Broadway and musical theatre-inspired song, performed at a "pastorally" tempo of 80 beats per minute in the key of D major. Vocally, the arrangement includes several high notes. Combined, O'Hara and White's vocal ranges span approximately two octaves, from A3 to G5. Additionally, actors Jesse Corti, Alec Murphy, Mary Kay Bergman, and Kath Soucie's voices are also featured on the track. In total, "Belle" lasts five minutes and nine seconds in duration. The song's verse, chorus, and musical break structure allows for the interjection of monologue and dialogue. According to Irving Tan of Sputnikmusic, the track is an "idyllic, orchestra-driven" operetta. Menken described it as "19th-century operetta style", and Filmtracks.com called it "snare-tapping".

Belle
"Belle" is a highly complex piece, which comprises the interweaving of conversation snippets from several characters.

The track begins slowly with Belle's solo describing a typical morning in her village before several distinct townspeople join her singing "bonjour". She sings "Little town, it's a quiet village / Every day, like the one before". Afterwards, "Belle" adopts a faster speed, becoming a "rhythmically driven tune" that several patrons perform at various moments throughout the song, including the Baker's line "Marie! The baguettes! Hurry up". The town ostracizes Belle for her love of reading but considers her beauty a redeeming quality, describing her as "A beauty, but a funny girl". Eventually, the song introduces a counter melody performed by Belle, who lovingly recounts a book she is reading about a young woman and a handsome prince, followed by Gaston singing a faster melody with the Bimbettes, who fawn over him. As the song crescendos, Belle belts her desire for greater ambitions "There must be more than this provincial life", countered with Gaston's "Just watch, I'm going to make Belle my wife", highlighting their opposing dreams and goals. According to author Alexandra Heatwole, Belle's line is representative of the Disney Renaissance heroines' overarching desire to break away from the confines of social milieus, noting that Ariel and Jasmine expressed similar longings in their songs. Finally, in a Broadway-style climax, the song concludes with virtually every villager singing together.

Lyrically, its verses are interspersed with dialogue from various characters, which was unusual for an animated film at the time. The protagonist discusses how she feels left out and unseen by her peers, who describe her as their "most peculiar mademoiselle" due to her love of reading. Its lyrics also describe the actions occurring throughout the scene, such as "There goes the baker with his tray like always". It includes the lyrics "Here's where she meets Prince Charming/But she won't discover that it's him 'til chapter three!" Billboard found the vocal and lyrical layering to be reminiscent of songs from the musical Les Misérables. Katrine Ames of Newsweek likened its "sly and quick-cutting dialogue" to the work of composer Stephen Sondheim. Tyler B. Searle of Collider identified its overall theme as "how society treats those it deems different, which has helped it remain topical thirty years later". Thematically, Jonathan Romney of Sight and Sound found it similar to "Maria" from The Sound of Music, while author Andrew Osmond called it "the radiant flipside to Menken and Ashman's tragicomic ‘Skid Row' in the musical Little Shop of Horrors".

== Critical response ==
"Wandering through her village while reading a book, Belle becomes the focus of a spectacular opening number that captures the essence of this film's appeal. Bit by bit, the population trickles out to greet Belle and gossip about her, while she herself bemoans the small-mindedness of the place. This rousing number reaches such a flurry of musical counterpoint that it recalls sources as unlikely as West Side Story, while the direction builds energetically from quiet beginnings to a formidable finale."
— The New York Times film critic Janet Maslin's detailed analysis of the song and its corresponding scene.

When an unfinished version of Beauty and the Beast premiered at the New York Film Festival on September 29, 1991, "Belle" was one of the few sequences to have been almost completely animated in time for the premiere. The song received a standing ovation from the festival audience.

"Belle" has received widespread acclaim. Filmtracks.com hailed the song as "among the most satisfying and clever cast pieces in history", calling it deserving of its Academy Award for Best Original Song nomination. Filmtracks.com also praised its reprise, drawing similarities to the title song from The Sound of Music. Bob Hoose of Plugged In called it "masterful". James Berardinelli of ReelViews described "Belle" as "the animated equivalent of Broadway show-stoppers, with all the energy and audacity of something choreographed by Busby Berkeley". Pete Vonder Haar of the Houston Press liked both the song and its reprise, admitting to the inevitability of having to experience an "unexpected swell of emotion" when both songs are heard.

Several critics praised the song's quality and effectiveness as an opening number, which Josh Spiegel of The A.V. Club has enough " conversational musicality to rival the work of Stephen Sondheim". Spiegel said the song is one of Disney's most memorable, despite not being their most hummable. Jennie Punter of The Globe and Mail hailed "Belle" as "one of the most delightful openings of any movie musical", and Bruce Westbrook of the Houston Chronicle called it "a traditional 'I want' Broadway song at its best". In a review for The New York Times, journalist Janet Maslin called "Belle" "a spectacular opening number that captures the essence of this film's appeal", comparing it to musical selections from the film West Side Story (1961). Highlighting the song as one of the film's most notable, Sandie Angulo Chen of Moviefone described "Belle" as "infectious", and AllMusic's Perry Seibert called it a highlight from "one of the great soundtracks in movie history". TV Guide positively compared "Belle" to some of the songs featured in the musicals Fiddler on the Roof and She Loves Me. Writing for Sight and Sound, Jonathan Romney praised the animation and direction of the sequence, which he likened to the work of comic actor Buster Keaton. Ben Travis of Empire said the scene showcases some of the studio's finest choreography. In 2017, Bustle writer Kayleigh Hughes said lyrics such as "There must be more than this provincial life" have "stood the test of time". Caitlin Devlin of Ticketmaster called "Belle "the best opening number of any Disney musical", while Flynn Kaufman of Screen Rant called it "wonderful". Gregory Ellwood of HitFix wrote, "you can't argue the cinematic joy in numbers such as the opening 'Belle'." However, Jessica Mason of The Mary Sue accused the film of depriving Belle of her own solo and limiting her "I Want" song to a reprise.

Alongside "Be Our Guest" and "Beauty and the Beast", "Belle" was one of the three Beauty and the Beast songs that received an Academy Award nomination for Best Original Song at the 64th Academy Awards in 1992. Beauty and the Beast became the first film to receive three Oscar nominations for Best Original Song. "Belle" ultimately lost to the film's title and theme song.

== Live performances and cover versions ==
O'Hara performed "Belle" live for the first time at the 64th Academy Awards in 1992, where the song had been nominated for Best Original Song. Disney executives Michael Eisner and Jeffrey Katzenberg insisted that "Belle" be performed by its original artists, despite producers of the telecast requesting pop stars. O'Hara also insisted on singing live, despite being offered the choice to lip-synch. The actress disliked the blue checked costume she wore for the performance, which she described as "too frilly" for Belle's personal style. In August 2011, O'Hara performed an abridged version of "Belle" live at the Disney Legends awards ceremony, at which she was an honoree. The performance was a Beauty and the Beast medley, in which O'Hara combined "Belle" with "Beauty and the Beast" and "Be Our Guest". In January 2020, O'Hara sang a few lines from "Belle" at the premiere of a Beauty and the Beast Sing-Along at Epcot. During the COVID-19 pandemic lockdowns in 2020, actress and writer Mary Neely recorded an elaborate performance of herself lip syncing the song as Belle and the townsfolk, donning various costumes.

Michelle Nicastro covered "Belle" for her movie-themed album Toonful (1993). The song appears in the stage adaptation of the film, which premiered on Broadway in 1994. David Richards of The New York Times called it "reminiscent of Lerner and Loewe". Susan Egan originated Belle in the production, and recorded the song for the original cast album with Burke Moses as Gaston.

In the 2017 live-action film, "Belle" is sung by Emma Watson and Luke Evans. Among the changes made to the scene, Belle does not have a conversation with the Baker, but her love of books is maintained. Director Bill Condon confirmed the scene's staging was inspired by the film Love Me Tonight (1932), which opens with a musical number about Paris waking up. Writing for Variety, Owen Gleiberman found the staging of this version to be lacking the "slapstick spryness" of the animation despite its faithfulness to the original material and Watson's performance, saying, "the number feels like something out of one of those overly bustling big-screen musicals from the late '60s that helped to bury the studio system". According to Kaitlin Reilly of Refinery29, some fans complained that the baker's line about baguettes had been removed from the remake. The author attributed the revision to the scene being paced differently than the animated film. In 2023, Watson's version of the song was certified Gold by the RIAA.

== Legacy ==
"Belle" is considered to be one of the most famous songs from Beauty and the Beast. CinemaBlend ranked "Belle" and its reprise the third and fifth best songs from the film, respectively. The same publication named it the seventh best Disney Princess song. Consequence ranked "Belle" the 12th best Disney song, hailing it as "One of the great opening numbers in all of musical theatre" and arguably the score's catchiest song. Time also ranked it 12th, with author Barry Levitt writing that it "infectiously establishes why Belle ... has become such a beloved Disney princess". The Ringer ranked Belle 23rd. Billboard ranked it the 42nd best song in the Disney universe, calling it "tough to beat" among opening numbers. The same publication ranked it the 13th best song from the Disney Renaissance, while Syfy ranked it 28th, and Den of Geek placed it 5th. "Belle" has also been ranked among Disney's best "I Want" songs by publications such as MTV News. Vulture ranked the reprise Disney's third-best "I Want" song. Collider ranked it the eighth-best opening song from a musical film.

"Belle" is heavily parodied in the animated musical film South Park: Bigger, Longer & Uncut (1999) through its opening number, "Mountain Town". Filmtracks.com described the parody as "a delightful introductory piece". Amy Keating Rogers, a writer working on the animated television series My Little Pony: Friendship Is Magic, mentioned she was influenced by the song as she wrote "Pinkie the Party Planner", the first musical number that appears in the musical-intensive episode "Pinkie Pride".

== Certifications ==
Region	Certification	Certified units/sales
United Kingdom (BPI) Sales since 2006	Silver	200,000^{‡}
United States (RIAA)	Gold	500,000^{‡}
^{‡} Sales+streaming figures based on certification alone.
