= Beauty and the Beast (1991 film) =

American animated film by Disney

- Theatrical release poster by John Alvin
- Directed by: Gary Trousdale; Kirk Wise
- Screenplay by: Linda Woolverton
- Story by: Brenda Chapman; Chris Sanders; Burny Mattinson; Kevin Harkey; Brian Pimental; Bruce Woodside; Joe Ranft; Tom Ellery; Kelly Asbury; Robert Lence
- Based on: "Beauty and the Beast" by Gabrielle-Suzanne Barbot de Villeneuve
- Produced by: Don Hahn
- Starring: Paige O'Hara; Robby Benson; Richard White; Jerry Orbach; David Ogden Stiers; Angela Lansbury; Bradley Michael Pierce; Rex Everhart; Jesse Corti; Hal Smith; Jo Anne Worley
- Edited by: John Carnochan
- Music by: Alan Menken
- Production company: Walt Disney Feature Animation
- Distributed by: Buena Vista Pictures Distribution (Note: Distributed under the Walt Disney Pictures banner, with funding by Silver Screen Partners IV.)
- Release dates: September 29, 1991 (New York Film Festival); November 22, 1991 (United States)
- Running time: 84 minutes
- Country: United States
- Language: English
- Budget: $25 million
- Box office: $451.2 million

Beauty and the Beast is a 1991 American animated musical romantic fantasy film directed by Gary Trousdale and Kirk Wise, written by Linda Woolverton, and based on the French fairy tale "Beauty and the Beast". (Note: The film incorporates elements from Gabrielle-Suzanne Barbot de Villeneuve's original version and Jeanne-Marie Leprince de Beaumont's abridged adaptation of the fairy tale. However, neither author was credited upon the film's release, with de Beaumont receiving recognition only in the French dub.) Produced by Walt Disney Feature Animation, the film stars Paige O'Hara, Robby Benson, Richard White, Jerry Orbach, David Ogden Stiers, Angela Lansbury, Bradley Michael Pierce, Rex Everhart, Jesse Corti, Hal Smith in his final film, and Jo Anne Worley. Set in 18th-century France, a selfish prince is cursed to remain a beast forever unless he can earn the love of a spirited young woman named Belle before the final petal falls from his enchanted rose.

Walt Disney had attempted to adapt "Beauty and the Beast" into an animated film during the 1930s and 1950s. Inspired by the success of The Little Mermaid (1989), the studio enlisted Richard Purdum to adapt the fairy tale, which he originally conceived as a non-musical period drama. Dissatisfied with Purdum's efforts, Disney executive Jeffrey Katzenberg ordered the entire film reworked into a musical with original songs by The Little Mermaid's songwriting team, lyricist Howard Ashman and composer Alan Menken. First-time directors Trousdale and Wise replaced Purdum, and Woolverton's involvement made Beauty and the Beast Disney's first animated film to utilize a completed screenplay prior to storyboarding. The film was the second fully made with Computer Animation Production System (CAPS), which enabled seamless blending of traditional and computer animation, particularly during its ballroom scene. Beauty and the Beast is dedicated to Ashman, who died from AIDS eight months before the film's release.

Beauty and the Beast premiered at the New York Film Festival with an unfinished version on September 29, 1991, before its wide release on November 22. It received widespread acclaim for its story, characters, music, and animation, specifically for the ballroom sequence. With an initial worldwide gross of $331 million, the film finished its run as the third highest-grossing film of 1991 and the first animated film to gross over $100 million in the United States. Subsequent re-releases (IMAX in 2002 and 3D in 2012) later increased the film's all-time gross to $451 million. Among its accolades, Beauty and the Beast was the first animated film to win the Golden Globe Award for Best Motion Picture – Musical or Comedy and the first to receive a nomination for the Academy Award for Best Picture. At the latter's 64th ceremony, the film received five other nominations, ultimately winning the Academy Awards for Best Original Score and Best Original Song ("Beauty and the Beast"). The film is considered one of the greatest animated films of all time.

In 1994, Beauty and the Beast became the first Disney film adapted into a Broadway musical, which won a Tony Award and ultimately ran for 13 years. Other derivate works include three direct-to-video follow-ups, a television series, a live-action remake in 2017, and a live-action/animated television special in 2022. In 2002, Beauty and the Beast was selected for preservation in the United States National Film Registry by the Library of Congress for being "culturally, historically, or aesthetically significant".

== Plot ==
In a faraway land lives a young but cruel and selfish prince in his castle. One night, an old beggar woman arrives at the castle and offers the prince an enchanted rose in exchange for shelter from a storm. When he scornfully declines, she reveals her true form as an enchantress and transforms him into a beast and his servants into household objects. To break the curse, the prince must learn to love someone and gain that person's love before the last petal of the rose falls; if he fails, he will remain a beast for the rest of his life.

Ten years later, in a nearby village, Belle, the bookish daughter of eccentric inventor Maurice, dreams of adventure while constantly rejecting advances from Gaston, an arrogant hunter. One day, Maurice travels to a local fair to present his latest invention, a wood-chopping machine, but becomes lost in the forest. Upon seeking refuge in the Beast's castle, he is eventually detained for trespassing. Maurice's horse, Philippe, returns to Belle and takes her to the castle. After Belle finds Maurice locked in the castle dungeon, she offers to take his place as a prisoner; the Beast agrees.

Belle meets the castle's servants, including candelabra Lumière, mantel clock Cogsworth, teapot Mrs. Potts, and her son Chip, a teacup. To break the spell, the servants try to help the Beast win Belle's heart, but his temper makes her more distant. When Belle finds the enchanted rose, the Beast angrily forces her to flee outside. Wolves ambush Belle, and the Beast rescues her, getting injured in the process. As she nurses his wounds, they develop a rapport. Over time, they begin to fall in love.

In the village, Maurice fails to convince the townsfolk of the Beast. Hearing Maurice's statements, Gaston bribes Monsieur D'Arque, the warden of the local insane asylum, to have Maurice declared insane and locked up, which Gaston will use to blackmail Belle into marrying him in exchange for Maurice's release. Before they can act, Maurice leaves to attempt a rescue alone. At the castle, Belle and the Beast have a romantic dance, which almost seals their love. After that, Belle discovers Maurice's predicament via a magic mirror. Out of his love for her, the Beast releases Belle to rescue him. After returning to town, a mob led by Gaston and D'Arque arrive to arrest Maurice. Belle reveals the Beast via the mirror, shocking the townsfolk and proving her father's sanity. Realizing she has fallen for the Beast, Gaston jealously has her thrown into the cellar with Maurice and rallies the villagers to kill the Beast. Chip, who stowed away when Belle left, frees the two with Maurice's machine.

As the castle's servants defeat the villagers, Gaston attacks the depressed Beast, who regains his spirit upon seeing Belle return and spares Gaston's life, but Gaston fatally stabs him before losing his footing and falling to his demise. (Note: Gary Trousdale, Kirk Wise, and Don Hahn confirmed on the audio commentary that Gaston died after he fell off the rooftops. Additionally, a frame where Gaston falls reveals skulls in his irises.) Belle tearfully professes her love to a dying Beast mere seconds before the last petal falls, which undoes the curse, reviving the Beast and restoring him and his servants to their human forms, and the castle is restored to its true appearance. The prince and Belle later host a ball for the kingdom.

== Voice cast ==
- Paige O'Hara as Belle, a bright young woman who seeks adventure and offers her own freedom to the Beast in return for her father's. To "enhance" the character from the original story, the filmmakers felt that Belle should be "unaware" of her own beauty and made her "a little odd". Wise recalls casting O'Hara because of a "unique tone" she had, "a little bit of Judy Garland", after whose appearance Belle was modeled. (Note: James Baxter and Mark Henn served as the supervising animators for Belle.)
- Robby Benson as the Beast, a young prince named Adam who is transformed into a talking beast by an enchantress as punishment for his arrogance and selfishness. The animators drew him with the head structure and horns of an American bison, the arms and body of a bear, the eyebrows of a gorilla, the teeth and mane of a lion, the tusks of a wild boar, and the legs and tail of a wolf. Storyboard artist and visual development artist Chris Sanders drafted designs for the Beast and came up with designs based on birds, insects, and fish before coming up with something close to the final design. Glen Keane, supervising animator for the Beast, refined the design by going to the zoo and studying the animals on which the Beast was based. Benson commented, "There's a rage and torment in this character I've never been asked to use before." The filmmakers commented that "everybody was big fee-fi-fo-fum and gravelly" while Benson had the "big voice and the warm, accessible side" so that "you could hear the prince beneath the fur".
- Richard White as Gaston, a hunter who vies for Belle's hand in marriage. He serves as a foil personality to the Beast, who was originally as egotistical as Gaston prior to saving Belle from the wolves. Gaston's supervising animator, Andreas Deja, was pressed by Jeffrey Katzenberg to make Gaston handsome in contrast to the traditional appearance of a Disney villain, an assignment he found difficult at first. In the beginning, Gaston is depicted as more of a narcissist than a villain, but later he threatens to put Maurice in a mental institution if Belle does not marry him, and eventually leads all the villagers to kill the Beast, enraged that Belle would love a beast more than him.
- Jerry Orbach as Lumière, the kind-hearted but rebellious French-accented maître d' of the Beast's castle, who has been transformed into a candelabra. He has a habit of disobeying his master's strict rules, sometimes causing tension between them, but the Beast often turns to him for advice. He is depicted as flirtatious, as he is frequently seen with the Featherduster and immediately takes a liking to Belle. A running gag throughout the film is Lumière burning Cogsworth. (Note: Nik Ranieri served as the supervising animator for Lumière.)
- David Ogden Stiers as Cogsworth, the Beast's majordomo, the head butler of the household staff and Lumière's best friend, who has been turned into a mantel clock. He is extremely loyal to the Beast so as to save himself and anyone else any trouble, often leading to friction between himself and Lumière. Stiers also narrates the film's prologue. (Note: Will Finn served as the supervising animator for Cogsworth.)
- Angela Lansbury as Mrs. Potts, the housekeeper, turned into a teapot, who takes a motherly attitude toward Belle. The filmmakers went through several names for Mrs. Potts, such as "Mrs. Chamomile", before Ashman suggested the use of simple and concise names for the household objects. (Note: David Pruiksma served as the supervising animator for Mrs. Potts and Chip.)
- Bradley Pierce as Chip, Mrs. Potts's son, who has been transformed into a teacup. Originally intended to only have one line, the filmmakers were impressed with Pierce's performance and expanded the character's role significantly, eschewing a mute Music Box character.
- Rex Everhart as Maurice, Belle's inventor father. The villagers see him as insane for crafting devices believed impossible to construct in reality, but his loyal daughter believes he will be famous one day. (Note: Ruben A. Aquino served as the supervising animator for Maurice.)
- Jesse Corti as LeFou, Gaston's sidekick. He looks up to Gaston as his hero, and sings a song with the other villagers to cheer him up. His name is French for "The Madman" and also a phonetic play on "The Fool". (Note: Chris Wahl served as the supervising animator for LeFou.)
- Jo Anne Worley as the Wardrobe, the castle's authority over fashion, and a former opera singer, who has been turned into a wardrobe. The character of Wardrobe was introduced by visual development artist Sue C. Nichols to the then entirely male cast of servants, and was originally a more integral character named "Madame Armoire". Wardrobe is known as "Madame de la Grande Bouche" (Madame Big Mouth) in the stage adaptation of the film and is the only major enchanted object character whose human form does not appear in the film. (Note: Tony Anselmo served as the supervising animator for the Wardrobe.)
- Hal Smith as Philippe, Belle's horse. (Note: Russ Edmonds served as the supervising animator for Philippe.)
- Mary Kay Bergman and Kath Soucie as the Bimbettes, a trio of village maidens who constantly fawn over Gaston. They are known as the "Silly Girls" or "Les Filles de la Ville" (the village girls) in the stage adaptation.
- Jack Angel, Phil Proctor, Bill Farmer, and Patrick Pinney as Tom, Dick, Stanley, and Gramps, respectively, Gaston and LeFou's circle of friends.
- Brian Cummings as the Stove, the castle's chef who has been transformed into a stove. He is named Chef Bouche in 1998's Belle's Magical World.
- Alvin Epstein as the Bookseller, the owner of a book shop in Belle's village.
- Tony Jay as Monsieur D'Arque, the sadistic warden of the Asylum de Loons. Gaston bribes him to help in his plan to blackmail Belle.
- Alec Murphy as the Baker, the owner of a bakery in Belle's village.
- Kimmy Robertson as the Featherduster, a maid and Lumière's sweetheart, who has been turned into a feather duster. She is never mentioned by name in the 1991 film (listed as Featherduster in the credits); Babette is the name given to this character later in the 1994 stage adaptation of the film; Fifi in the 1998 animated musical film Belle's Magical World and Plumette in the 2017 live-action remake.
- Frank Welker as Sultan, the castle's pet dog turned into a footstool.

== Production ==
=== Early versions ===
Following the widespread critical and commercial success of Snow White and the Seven Dwarfs in 1937, Walt Disney sought out other stories to adapt into feature films. Among the titles considered was Jeanne-Marie Leprince de Beaumont's version of the "Beauty and the Beast" fairy tale. Walt attempted to adapt the story into an animated film during both the 1930s and 1950s, but efforts were shelved once the plot proved too challenging, particularly its second half. Author and film critic Peter M. Nichols suggested that Disney might have also been discouraged by the success of Jean Cocteau's 1946 version.

Decades later, as Who Framed Roger Rabbit was nearing completion in 1987, the Disney studio resurrected Beauty and the Beast as a project for the satellite animation studio they established in London, England to work on Roger Rabbit. Richard Williams, who had directed the animated portions of Roger Rabbit, was approached to direct Beauty and the Beast but declined in favor of prioritizing his long-gestating project, The Thief and the Cobbler. He suggested his colleague, English animation director Richard Purdum, in his place, and work began under producer Don Hahn on a non-musical version of Beauty and the Beast set in 19th-century France.

At the behest of Disney CEO Michael Eisner, Beauty and the Beast became the first Disney animated film to use a screenwriter in an official capacity. This was an unusual move for an animated film, which at this time were traditionally developed on storyboards rather than in a scripted form. After Linda Woolverton had written a spec script for a Winnie the Pooh project that was never developed, Katzenberg asked her to work on Beauty and the Beast, with her earliest drafts being darker and non-musical. Beauty and the Beast was Disney's first animated film to use a completed script prior to storyboarding and animation. Woolverton said there was a significant learning curve on Beauty and the Beast because the new process was not explained to herself nor the story department who, prior to Beauty and the Beast, would have done the screenwriting themselves. Roger Allers, the film's story supervisor, acknowledged some tension between Linda Woolverton and the story team but explained that Woolverton was unaccustomed to working in a collaborative environment where no material is considered sacred or untouchable as the story evolves from script to visual medium.

=== Script rewrite and musicalization ===
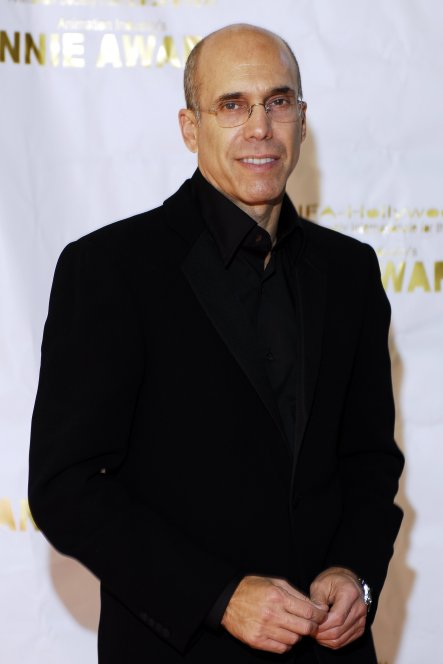
Upon seeing the initial storyboard reels in 1989, Walt Disney Studios chairman Jeffrey Katzenberg ordered that the film be scrapped and started over from scratch.

Upon seeing the initial storyboard reels in 1989, Walt Disney Studios chairman Jeffrey Katzenberg was dissatisfied with Purdum's idea and ordered that the film be scrapped and started over from scratch. A few months after starting anew, Purdum resigned as director. The studio had approached John Musker and Ron Clements to direct the film, but they turned down the offer, saying they were "tired" after just having finished directing Disney's recent success The Little Mermaid. Katzenberg then hired first-time feature directors Kirk Wise and Gary Trousdale. Wise and Trousdale had previously directed the animated sections of Cranium Command, a short film for a Disney EPCOT theme park attraction. In addition, wanting another musical film, Katzenberg asked songwriters Howard Ashman and Alan Menken, who had written the song score for The Little Mermaid, to turn Beauty and the Beast into a Broadway-style musical film in the same vein as Mermaid.

Ashman, who at the time had learned he was dying of complications from AIDS, had been working with Disney on a pet project of his, Aladdin, and only reluctantly agreed to join the struggling production team. To accommodate Ashman's failing health, pre-production of Beauty and the Beast was moved from London to the Residence Inn in Fishkill, New York, close to Ashman's Beacon, New York home. Here, Ashman and Menken joined Wise, Trousdale, Hahn, and Woolverton in retooling the film's script. Since the original story had only two major characters, the filmmakers enhanced them, added new characters in the form of enchanted household items who "add warmth and comedy to a gloomy story" and guide the audience through the film, and added a "real villain" in the form of Gaston. Ashman and Woolverton agreed that their story should really be the Beast's story, since according to Hahn "He's the guy trapped in the monkey suit who has to redeem himself during the course of the movie. The meter's ticking for him."

The film also incorporates ideas from the 1946 French film directed by Jean Cocteau. These ideas were somewhat similar to elements of the 1946 French film version of Beauty and the Beast, which introduced the character of Avenant, an oafish suitor somewhat similar to Gaston, as well as inanimate objects coming to life in the Beast's castle. The animated objects were, however, given distinct personalities in the Disney version. By early 1990, Katzenberg had approved the revised script, and storyboarding began again. The production flew story artists back and forth between California and New York for storyboard approvals from Ashman, though the team was not told the reason why.

=== Casting and recording ===
Disney had originally considered casting Jodi Benson from The Little Mermaid as Belle. They eventually decided upon Broadway actress and singer Paige O'Hara in favor of having a heroine who sounded "more like a woman than a girl". According to co-director Kirk Wise, O'Hara was given the role because she "had a unique quality, a tone she would hit that made her special", reminiscent to that of American actress and singer Judy Garland. O'Hara, who, after reading about the film in The New York Times, competed for the role against 500 hopefuls, believes the fact that lyricist Howard Ashman admired her cast recording of the musical Show Boat proved integral in her being cast. O'Hara modeled her interpretation of Belle after the spirited performance of Katharine Hepburn in Little Women (1933).

Several actors were considered to voice the Beast, the role was eventually given to actor Robby Benson. A number of actors were considered for the role of Cogsworth (including John Cleese), before David Ogden Stiers was cast for his first film role for Disney. Stiers was also originally considered to voice Lumiere until the role was given to Jerry Orbach, whom Stiers had apologized to Orbach for "having the temerity to audition for the role". The role of Mrs. Potts was originally considered for Julie Andrews, but she turned down the role; Angela Lansbury was cast instead. Among a number of actors that were auditioned for the role of Gatson was Rupert Everett, until Richard White was cast to make the character sound more arrogant. Jason Alexander was originally considered to voice Lefou, before Jesse Corti was cast.

=== Animation ===
A frame from the "Beauty and the Beast" ballroom dance sequence. The background was animated using computer generated imagery which, when the traditionally animated characters are composited against it using Pixar's CAPS system, gives the illusion of a dollying film camera.

Production of Beauty and the Beast was to be completed on a compressed timeline of two years rather than the traditional four-year Disney Feature Animation production schedule; this was due to the loss of production time spent developing the earlier Purdum version of the film. Most of the production was done at the main Feature Animation studio, housed in the Air Way facility in Glendale, California. A smaller team at the Disney-MGM Studios theme park in Lake Buena Vista, Florida assisted the California team on several scenes, particularly the "Be Our Guest" number.

Beauty and the Beast was the second film, after The Rescuers Down Under, produced using the Computer Animation Production System (CAPS), a digital scanning, ink, paint, and compositing system of software and hardware developed for Disney by Pixar. The software allowed for a wider range of colors, as well as soft shading and colored line effects for the characters, techniques lost when the Walt Disney studios abandoned hand inking for xerography in the early 1960s. CAPS/ink & paint also allowed the production crew to simulate multiplane effects: placing characters and/or backgrounds on separate layers and moving them towards/away from the camera on the Z-axis to give the illusion of depth, as well as altering the focus of each layer.

In addition, CAPS/ink & paint allowed an easier combination of hand-drawn art with computer-generated imagery, which before had to be plotted to animation paper and then xeroxed and painted traditionally. This technique was put to significant use during the "Beauty and the Beast" waltz sequence, in which Belle and Beast dance through a computer-generated ballroom as the camera dollies around them in simulated 3D space. The filmmakers had originally decided against the use of computers in favor of traditional animation, but later, when the technology had improved, decided it could be used for the one scene in the ballroom. Before that, CGI environments had first been printed out as wireframe, but this was the first time Disney made use of 3D rendering. The success of the ballroom sequence helped convince studio executives to further invest in computer animation. Pixar's RenderMan, among other software, was used to render the ballroom.

The final dance between Belle and the Prince was reused from the final dance sequence between Princess Aurora and Prince Phillip from the 1959 film Sleeping Beauty. According to Trousdale, this was done because production of the film was nearing the deadline, and this was the easiest way to do that sequence.

=== Music ===
Ashman and Menken wrote the Beauty song score during the pre-production process in Fishkill, the opening operetta-styled "Belle" being their first composition for the film. Other songs included "Be Our Guest", sung to Belle by the objects when she becomes the first visitor to eat at the castle in a decade and not to be locked in the dungeon, "Gaston", a solo for the swaggering villain and his bumbling sidekick, "Human Again", a song describing Belle and Beast's growing love from the objects' perspective, the love ballad "Beauty and the Beast (Tale as Old as Time)" and the climactic "The Mob Song". As story and song development came to a close, full production began in Burbank while voice and song recording began in New York City. The Beauty songs were mostly recorded live with the orchestra and the voice cast performing simultaneously rather than overdubbed separately, to give the songs a cast album-like "energy" the filmmakers and songwriters desired.

During the course of production, many changes were made to the structure of the film, necessitating the replacement and re-purposing of songs. After screening a mostly animated version of the "Be Our Guest" sequence, story artist Bruce Woodside suggested that the objects should be singing the song to Belle rather than her father. Wise and Trousdale agreed, and the sequence and song were retooled to replace Maurice with Belle. The film's title song went through a noted bit of uncertainty during production. Originally conceived as a rock-oriented song, it was changed to the version seen in the film. Howard Ashman and Alan Menken asked Angela Lansbury to perform the song, but she did not think her voice was suited for the melody.

When she voiced her doubts, Menken and Ashman asked her for at least one take and told her to perform the song as she saw fit. Lansbury reportedly reduced everyone in the studio to tears with her rendition, nailing the song in the one take asked of her. This version went on to win the Oscar for Best Original Song. "Human Again" was dropped from the film before animation began, as its lyrics caused story problems about the timeline over which the story takes place. This required Ashman and Menken to write a new song in its place. "Something There", in which Belle and Beast sing (via voiceover) of their growing fondness for each other, was composed late in production and inserted into the script in place of "Human Again".

Menken would later revise "Human Again" for inclusion in the 1994 Broadway stage version of Beauty and the Beast, and another revised version of the song was added to the film itself in a new sequence created for the film's Special Edition re-release in 2002. Ashman died of AIDS-related complications at the age of 40 on March 14, 1991, eight months before the film's release. He never saw the finished film, though he did get to see it in its unfinished format. Ashman's work on Aladdin was completed by another lyricist, Tim Rice. Before Ashman's death, members of the film's production team visited him after the film's well-received first screening, with Don Hahn commenting that "the film would be a great success. Who'd have thought it?" Ashman replied, "I would".

A tribute to the lyricist was included at the end of the credits crawl: "To our friend, Howard, who gave a mermaid her voice and a beast his soul, we will be forever grateful. Howard Ashman 1950–1991". A pop version of the "Beauty and the Beast" theme, performed by Céline Dion and Peabo Bryson over the end credits, was released as a commercial single from the film's soundtrack, supported with a music video. The Dion/Bryson version of "Beauty and the Beast" became an international pop hit and performed considerably well on charts around the world. The song became Dion's second single to land within the top-10 of the Billboard Hot 100, peaking at number nine. The song peaked at number three on the Billboard Hot Adult Contemporary chart. In Canada, "Beauty and the Beast" peaked at number two. Outside of North America, the song peaked within the top ten in New Zealand and the United Kingdom, while peaking within the top twenty in Australia, Netherlands, and Ireland. The song sold over a million copies worldwide. This version of the song was also nominated for Record of the Year, Song of the Year, and Best Pop Duo/Group Vocal Performance at the 35th Annual Grammy Awards, winning the latter.

== Release ==
=== Work-in-progress and original theatrical run ===
Disney made a concerted effort to market the film towards both children and adults, arguably more-so than they had done with any previous animated film from the studio. To appeal to adult audiences, the approach involved blending live-action filmmaking techniques with animation, crafting a narrative that resonates with mature perspectives, and evoking nostalgia among baby boomers through a classic Broadway-style soundtrack. The film also employed two distinct main theatrical posters, one showcasing colorful, child-friendly artwork featuring the ensemble of animated characters; the other presents a darker, more subdued image of the title characters dancing in silhouette, which Disney placed in newspaper ads to appeal to adult readers.

In a first-time accomplishment for The Walt Disney Company, an unfinished version of Beauty and the Beast was shown at the New York Film Festival on September 29, 1991. The film was deemed a "work in progress" because roughly only 70% of the animation had been completed; storyboards and pencil tests were used in replacement of the remaining 30%. Additionally, certain segments of the film that had already been finished were reverted to previous stages of completion. At the end of the Disney screening, Beauty and the Beast received enthusiastic reviews and a ten-minute-long standing ovation from the film festival audience. The completed film was also screened out of competition at the 1992 Cannes Film Festival. The finished film premiered at the El Capitan Theatre in Hollywood on November 13, 1991, beginning a limited release before expanding wide on November 22, along with the openings of The Addams Family and An American Tail: Fievel Goes West.

=== Reissues ===
The film was restored and remastered for its New Year's Day, 2002 re-release in IMAX theaters in a special-edition edit, including a new musical sequence. Although Disney's anthology film Fantasia 2000 was the first feature-length animated film to be released in IMAX, Beauty and the Beast was the first narrative film to receive a major IMAX release. For this version of the film, much of the animation was cleaned up, a new sequence set to the deleted song "Human Again" was inserted into the film's second act, and a new digital master from the original CAPS production files was used to make the high-resolution IMAX film negative.

A sing-along edition, hosted by Jordin Sparks, was released in select theaters on September 29 and October 2, 2010. Prior to the showing, Sparks showed an exclusive behind-the-scenes look at the newly restored film and the making of her new Beauty and the Beast music video. There was also commentary from producer Hahn, interviews with the cast and an inside look at how the animation was created.

A Disney Digital 3-D version, the second of a traditionally animated film, was originally scheduled to be released in US theatres on February 12, 2010, but the project was postponed, first to 2011 and then to 2012. On August 25, 2011, Disney announced that the 3D version would make its American debut at Hollywood's El Capitan Theatre from September 2–15, 2011. Disney spent less than $10 million on the 3D conversion. After the successful 3D re-release of The Lion King, Disney announced a wide 3D re-release of Beauty and the Beast in North America beginning January 13, 2012.

To celebrate Disney's 100th anniversary, Beauty and the Beast was re-released in selected Cinemark theaters from August 18 to 31, 2023, across the United Kingdom from September 22 to 28, and in Helios theaters across Poland on October 7.

=== Home media ===
On October 30, 1992, in the United States and Canada, Walt Disney Home Video (currently known as Walt Disney Studios Home Entertainment) released the film to VHS, Beta and LaserDisc as part of the Walt Disney Classics series, and later put it on moratorium on April 30, 1993, it was not included in the Walt Disney Masterpiece Collection line. The "work-in-progress" version screened at the New York Film Festival was also released on VHS and LaserDisc at this time; however, said version was the only one available on the latter format until the fall of 1993, when the completed theatrical version was released. This measure was to diminish the threat of video pirates making copies derived from the LaserDisc (which are not copy-protected) and selling them in international markets, where the film was yet to be available for home release. By October 1993, the VHS sold a record 20–22 million units. In 1993, the film was also released on home video in different countries, including the United Kingdom on September 20 of that year, and sold a record 8.5 million units.

Beauty and the Beast: Special Edition, as the enhanced version of the film released in IMAX/large-format is called, was released on a THX certified "Platinum Edition" two-disc DVD and VHS on October 8, 2002. The DVD set features three versions of the film: the extended IMAX Special Edition with the "Human Again" sequence added, the original theatrical version, and the New York Film Festival "work-in-progress" version. This release went to "Disney Vault" moratorium status in January 2003, along with its direct-to-video follow-ups Beauty and the Beast: The Enchanted Christmas and Belle's Magical World.

The film was released from the vault on October 5, 2010, as the second of Disney's Diamond Editions, in the form of a three-disc Blu-ray Disc and DVD combination pack—the first release of Beauty and the Beast on home video in high-definition format. This edition consists of four versions of the film: the original theatrical version, an extended version, the New York Film Festival storyboard-only version, and a fourth iteration displaying the storyboards via picture-in-picture alongside the original theatrical version. Upon its first week of release, the Blu-ray sold 1.1 million units, topping the Blu-ray sales chart and finishing in third place on the combined Blu-ray and DVD sales chart for the week ending on October 10, 2010. It was the second-best-selling Blu-ray of 2010, behind Avatar. A two-disc DVD edition was released on November 23, 2010. A five-disc combo pack, featuring Blu-ray 3D, Blu-ray 2D, DVD and a digital copy, was released on October 4, 2011. The 3D combo pack is identical to the original Diamond Edition, except for the added 3D disc and digital copy. The Blu-ray release went into the Disney Vault along with the two sequels on April 30, 2012.

A 25th-anniversary Signature Edition was released on Digital HD September 6, 2016, and was followed by Blu-ray/DVD combo pack on September 20, 2016. Upon its first week of release on home media in the U.S., the film topped the Blu-ray Disc sales chart, and debuted at number 3 in the Nielsen VideoScan First Alert chart, which tracks overall disc sales, behind Teenage Mutant Ninja Turtles: Out of the Shadows and Captain America: Civil War. The film was released on 4K digital download and Ultra HD Blu-ray on March 10, 2020.

== Reception ==
=== Box office ===
For its original theatrical run, Beauty and the Beast earned $9.6 million in its opening weekend, ranking in third place behind The Addams Family and Cape Fear. During its initial release in 1991, the film grossed $145.9 million in revenues in North America and $331.9 million worldwide. It ranked as the third-most successful film of 1991 in North America, surpassed only by the summer blockbusters Terminator 2: Judgment Day and Robin Hood: Prince of Thieves. At the time, Beauty and the Beast was the most successful animated Disney film release, and the first animated film to reach $100 million in the United States and Canada in its initial run. In its IMAX re-release, it earned $25.5 million in North America and $5.5 million in other territories, for a worldwide total of $31 million.

It also earned $9.8 million from its 3D re-release overseas. During the opening weekend of its North American 3D re-release in 2012, Beauty and the Beast grossed $17.8 million, coming in at the No. 2 spot, behind Contraband, and achieved the highest opening weekend for an animated film in January. The film was expected to make $17.5 million over the weekend; however, the results topped its forecast and the expectations of box office analysts. The re-release ended its run on May 3, 2012, and earned $47.6 million, which brought the film's total gross in North America to $219 million. It made an estimated $206 million in other territories, for a worldwide total of $425 million. It was the highest-grossing film in Italy, surpassing the 39 billion lira grossed by Johnny Stecchino.

=== Critical response ===
Upon release, Beauty and the Beast received universal praise for its script, animation, characters, and music. Review aggregator website Rotten Tomatoes gives the film a 95% approval rating based on 170 reviews, with an average rating of 9.1/10. The website's critical consensus reads, "Enchanting, sweepingly romantic, and featuring plenty of wonderful musical numbers, Beauty and the Beast is one of Disney's most elegant animated offerings." Audiences polled by CinemaScore gave the film a rare "A+" grade. The film also holds a score of 95 out of 100 based on 22 reviews from critics on review aggregator Metacritic, indicating "universal acclaim". It is the fifth best-reviewed film from Walt Disney Animation Studios on the platform.

For The New York Times, Janet Maslin said Beauty and the Beast borrowed elements from The Little Mermaid to replicate its success, concluding, "lightning has definitely struck twice". Roger Ebert awarded the film a perfect score and called its quality on-par with Snow White and the Seven Dwarfs, Pinocchio (1940), and The Little Mermaid, writing that Beauty and the Beast recalls "an older and healthier Hollywood tradition in which the best writers, musicians, and filmmakers are gathered for a project on the assumption that a family audience deserves great entertainment, too". Kenneth Turan called it Disney's most satisfying film in decades for appealing to both children and adults "with a practiced expertness", and expected Beauty and the Beast to continue charming audiences "for a long time to come". James Berardinelli of ReelViews declared Beauty and the Beast "the finest animated movie ever made", praising its romance, music, inventiveness, and animation. He was among several critics who singled out its use of computer animation—particularly in the ballroom sequence—as a highlight.

Hal Hinson of The Washington Post called it "a near-masterpiece that draws on the sublime traditions of the past while remaining completely in sync with the sensibility of its time". Michael Sragow praised its animation, characterizations of Belle and the Beast, musical numbers, and voice acting, calling the film "a zesty charmer with a solid story and hip filigree". Gene Siskel declared it "one of the year's most entertaining films" and also believed Beauty and the Beast would revive the movie musical, a genre he said had been in decline for the previous 20 years. On their Siskel and Ebert show, both he and Ebert declared the film a "legitimate contender for Oscar consideration as Best Picture of the Year". Meanwhile, John Hartl of The Seattle Times praised the animators and voice actors for making audiences care about their characters. Jay Boyar of the Orlando Sentinel added that the film "has a beauty of a bite," commending Disney's attempt to tell a darker fairy tale in its use of themes and art direction. When animation historian Charles Solomon reviewed the IMAX re-release in 2001, he said that Beauty and the Beast " has the strongest claim to being a classic" of all the films Disney released during the 1980s and 1990s.

Some critics were more reserved in their praise. Dave Kehr described the film as "adequate holiday entertainment for children" but lacking the technical mastery and emotional depth of Disney's earlier work. Owen Gleiberman said that although the film delivers nearly everything one would want and expect from an animated Disney film, Beauty and the Beast lacks the heart and yearning of earlier efforts, deeming the Beast in particular underdeveloped. Animation historian Michael Barrier commented on Belle's character, noting that her intellect seems more symbolic—"hanging out with books" rather than engaging deeply with them—but acknowledged that the film pushes closer to the challenges tackled by the finest Walt Disney features. Cultural and thematic observations also stood out among scholars. David Whitley noted that Belle's independence marked a departure from earlier Disney heroines, as she was largely free from domestic chores and embodied a modern adolescent's undefined role. Whitley also highlighted the film's feminist undertones, critical view of Gaston's chauvinism, and the cyborg-like portrayal of the enchanted servants. Eric Smoodin reflected on how the film merges traditional fairy tales with feminism and technological innovation, suggesting its "greatness could be proved in terms of technology, narrative, or even politics."

=== Accolades ===
Alan Menken and Howard Ashman's song "Beauty and the Beast" won the Academy Award for Best Original Song, while Menken's score won the award for Best Original Score. Two other Menken and Ashman songs from the film, "Belle" and "Be Our Guest", were also nominated for Best Original Song. Beauty and the Beast was the first picture to receive three Academy Award nominations for Best Original Song, a feat that would be repeated by The Lion King (1994), Dreamgirls (2006), and Enchanted (2007). In 2008, Academy rules have been changed to limit each film to two nominations in this category.

The film was also nominated for Best Picture and Best Sound. It was the first animated film ever to be nominated for Best Picture, and remained the only animated film nominated until the 2009 nominee Up, after the Best Picture field had been widened to ten nominees. Thus, it remains the only animated film nominated for the award when only five nominees were allowed. It was the third Disney film ever to be nominated for Best Picture, following Mary Poppins (1964) and Dead Poets Society (1989). It became the first musical in twelve years to be nominated for the Academy Award for Best Picture of the Year, following All That Jazz (1979), and the last one to be nominated until Moulin Rouge! (2001), ten years later. It lost the Best Picture award to The Silence of the Lambs and the Best Sound award to Terminator 2: Judgment Day. With six nominations, the film currently shares the record for the most nominations for an animated film with WALL-E (2008), although, with three nominations in the Best Original Song category, Beauty and the Beast's nominations span only four categories, while WALL-E's nominations cover six individual categories. The February 2020 issue of New York Magazine lists Beauty and the Beast as among "The Best Movies That Lost Best Picture at the Oscars."

While The Little Mermaid was the first to be nominated, Beauty and the Beast became the first animated film to win the Golden Globe Award for Best Motion Picture – Musical or Comedy. This feat was later repeated by The Lion King and Toy Story 2.

List of awards and nominations
Award	Category	Nominee(s)	Result	Ref.
Academy Awards	Best Picture	Don Hahn	Nominated	
Academy Awards	Best Original Score	Alan Menken	Won	
Academy Awards	Best Original Song	"Be Our Guest"; Music by Alan Menken; Lyrics by Howard Ashman	Nominated	
Academy Awards	Best Original Song	"Beauty and the Beast"; Music by Alan Menken; Lyrics by Howard Ashman	Won	
Academy Awards	Best Original Song	"Belle"; Music by Alan Menken; Lyrics by Howard Ashman	Nominated	
Academy Awards	Best Sound	Terry Porter, Mel Metcalfe, David J. Hudson, and Doc Kane	Nominated	
Annie Awards	Best Animated Feature		Won	
Annie Awards	Outstanding Individual Achievement in the Field of Animation	Glen Keane	Won	
British Academy Film Awards	Best Original Film Score	Alan Menken and Howard Ashman	Nominated	
British Academy Film Awards	Best Special Visual Effects	Randy Fullmer	Nominated	
Chicago Film Critics Association Awards	Best Picture		Nominated	
Dallas–Fort Worth Film Critics Association Awards	Best Film		3rd Place	
Dallas–Fort Worth Film Critics Association Awards	Best Animated Film		Won	
Golden Globe Awards	Best Motion Picture – Musical or Comedy		Won	
Golden Globe Awards	Best Original Score – Motion Picture	Alan Menken	Won	
Golden Globe Awards	Best Original Song – Motion Picture	"Be Our Guest"; Music by Alan Menken; Lyrics by Howard Ashman	Nominated	
Golden Globe Awards	Best Original Song – Motion Picture	"Beauty and the Beast"; Music by Alan Menken; Lyrics by Howard Ashman	Won	
Grammy Awards	Album of the Year	Beauty and the Beast: Original Motion Picture Soundtrack – Walter Afanasieff, Howard Ashman, Alan Menken, and Various Artists	Nominated	
Grammy Awards	Record of the Year	"Beauty and the Beast" – Celine Dion, Peabo Bryson, and Walter Afanasieff	Nominated	
Grammy Awards	Song of the Year	"Beauty and the Beast" – Alan Menken and Howard Ashman	Nominated	
Grammy Awards	Best Pop Performance by a Duo or Group with Vocals	"Beauty and the Beast" – Celine Dion and Peabo Bryson	Won	
Grammy Awards	Best Pop Instrumental Performance	"Beauty and the Beast" – Richard Kaufman	Won	
Grammy Awards	Best Album for Children	Beauty and the Beast: Original Motion Picture Soundtrack – Various Artists	Won	
Grammy Awards	Best Instrumental Composition Written for a Motion Picture or for Television	Beauty and the Beast: Original Motion Picture Soundtrack – Alan Menken	Won	
Grammy Awards	Best Song Written Specifically for a Motion Picture or for Television	"Beauty and the Beast" – Alan Menken and Howard Ashman	Won	
Hugo Awards	Best Dramatic Presentation	Gary Trousdale, Kirk Wise, Linda Woolverton, Roger Allers, Kelly Asbury, Brenda Chapman, Jeanne-Marie Leprince de Beaumont, Tom Ellery, Kevin Harkey, Robert Lence, Burny Mattinson, Brian Pimental, Joe Ranft, Chris Sanders, and Bruce Woodside	Nominated	
Kansas City Film Critics Circle Awards	Best Animated Film		Won	
Los Angeles Film Critics Association Awards	Best Animated Film	Gary Trousdale and Kirk Wise	Won	
National Board of Review Awards	Special Award for Animation		Won	
Online Film & Television Association Awards	Film Hall of Fame: Productions		Inducted	
Online Film & Television Association Awards	Film Hall of Fame: Songs	"Beauty and the Beast"	Inducted	
Satellite Awards	Outstanding Youth DVD		Nominated	
Saturn Awards (1992)	Best Fantasy Film		Nominated	
Saturn Awards (1992)	Best Music	Alan Menken	Nominated	
Saturn Awards (2002)	Best Classic Film DVD Release		Nominated	
Young Artist Awards	Outstanding Family Entertainment of the Year		Won (Note: Tied with Aladdin.)	

== Legacy ==
Beauty and the Beast is widely regarded as a groundbreaking animated film due to its unprecedented combination of critical acclaim, box office success, accolades, and overall cultural impact. As one of the earliest Disney animated films to integrate computer-generated imagery in a way that significantly enhanced narrative and visual storytelling, it represents a pivotal transition between Disney's traditionally animated works and what would evolve into the artistic standard for modern animation, merging "the elegant simplicity of Disney's early fairy tales with elevated character development", according to IndieWire. Film critics and scholars recognize Beauty and the Beast for its innovative use of animation techniques achieved by blending traditional animation with computer-generated imagery, particularly exemplified by the ballroom sequence. (Note: Attributed to multiple references:) Film critic Richard Corliss said that, only four years later, Pixar's Toy Story would take full advantage of the computer animation foundation laid by Beauty and the Beast. Retrospective critics have argued that Beauty and the Beast marked a significant shift in Disney's depiction of female leads, being considered as much a departure from Cinderella (1950) and Sleeping Beauty as it was a precursor to Mulan (1998) and Moana (2016).

Although The Little Mermaid had been a significant achievement in restoring Disney's animation department, Beauty and the Beast would serve as the crucial follow-up test to prove whether Disney's resurgence was long-lasting, especially following the underperformance of The Rescuers Down Under. The film's success ultimately cemented Disney's return to dominating the animation industry as a forerunning entry in the Disney Renaissance. Journalist and filmmaker Bilge Ebiri identifies Beauty and the Beast, particularly its unfinished screening at the 1991 New York Film Festival, as a turning point in shifting the public stigma that had dismissed animated films as mere children's entertainment for decades. This event, he argues, helped critics and audiences recognize the complexity, artistry, and decision-making involved in animation, paving the way for the medium's acceptance as legitimate cinema. Similarly, Emma Cochrane of Empire wrote in a 2000 review that Beauty and the Beast signals the beginning of the public referring to animated films as "animated features" instead of "cartoons", which was encouraged by the film's animation, music, and storytelling appealing to adults arguably more than any prior animated film. According to Bill Gibron of PopMatters, the film's Best Picture Oscar nomination transcended categorical limitations, legitimizing animated films as serious contenders at the Academy Awards beyond musical and technical categories, and paving the way for future animated films to compete for Best Picture. The high standard set by the film continues to impact current Disney projects. According to Bruce Westbrook of the Houston Chronicle, Beauty and the Beast remains Disney's "crowning achievement", crediting it with cementing the studio's Broadway-style approach to animated musicals that would ultimately inspire their own stage adaptations. Additionally, writers for IndieWire believe the ballroom sequence alone "deserves to be recognized as one of the great moments in movie history".

Author Mayukh Sen reported that the film's legacy had only gotten stronger in the decades since the film's release, writing that "Even the most resistant of Disney agnostics will concede that Beauty and the Beast is the Disney Renaissance's unimpeachable artistic apex". Beauty and the Beast has been described by critics and journalists as one of Disney's greatest films. (Note: Attributed to multiple references:) Filmsite declared Beauty and the Beast "Arguably the most successful Disney animated film of all time". Consequence ranked it the best film of the Disney Renaissance, and retrospective critics have described it as the era's "crown jewel". Several publications have ranked it among the studio's best work, including The Independent (2), IGN (2), GamesRadar+ (2), Paste (2), The Daily Telegraph (4), and Rolling Stone (10), while Leah Pickett of Consequence described it as arguably "the most critically lauded animated film of the 20th century". In 2010, IGN named Beauty and the Beast the greatest animated film of all-time. In 2009, journalist Marc Bernardin ranked it the sixth-best animated film, and at the time thought it would be the only animated film to receive a Best Picture Academy Award nomination. Several media organizations have ranked the film among the greatest animated films of all-time, including Esquire, IndieWire (4), Harper's Bazaar (5), Parade (5), Time Out (11), Empire (20), and IGN (21). According to research conducted by 24/7 Wall Street based on online critic and audience ratings, and reported by USA Today in 2018, Beauty and the Beast is the 37th best animated film of all-time. In October 2026, USA Today surveyed an array of people from across the entertainment industry to rank the 100 best animated movies of all-time and Beauty and the Beast ranked 20th best of all-time.

In 2002, Beauty and the Beast was added to the United States National Film Registry as being deemed "culturally, historically, or aesthetically significant". In June 2008, the American Film Institute revealed its "Ten Top Ten" lists of the best ten films in ten "classic" American film genres, based on polls of over 1,500 people from the creative community. Beauty and the Beast was acknowledged as the seventh-best film in the animation genre. In previous lists, it ranked number 22 on the institute's list of best musicals and number 34 on its list of the best romantic American films. On the list of the greatest songs from American films, Beauty and the Beast ranked number 62.

American Film Institute recognition:

- AFI's 100 Years...100 Passions – No. 34
- AFI's 100 Years...100 Songs:
  - "Beauty and the Beast" – No. 62
- AFI's Greatest Movie Musicals – No. 22
- AFI's 10 Top 10 – No. 7 Animated film
- AFI's 100 Years ... 100 Heroes and Villains –
  - Belle – Nominated Hero

== Adaptations ==
=== Broadway musical ===
According to an article in the Houston Chronicle, "The catalyst for Disney's braving the stage was an article by The New York Times theater critic Frank Rich that praised Beauty and the Beast as 1991's best musical. Theatre Under The Stars (TUTS) executive director Frank Young had been trying to get Disney interested in a stage version of Beauty about the same time Eisner and Katzenberg were mulling over Rich's column. But Young couldn't seem to get in touch with the right person in the Disney empire. Nothing happened till the Disney execs started to pursue the project from their end. When they asked George Ives, the head of Actors Equity on the West Coast, which Los Angeles theater would be the best venue for launching a new musical, Ives said the best theater for that purpose would be TUTS. Not long after that, Disney's Don Frantz and Bettina Buckley contacted Young, and the partnership was under way." A stage condensation of the film, directed by Robert Jess Roth and choreographed by Matt West, both of whom moved on to the Broadway development, had already been presented at Disneyland at what was then called the Videopolis stage. Beauty and the Beast premiered in a joint production of Theatre Under The Stars and Disney Theatricals at the Music Hall, Houston, Texas, from November 28, 1993, through December 26, 1993.

On April 18, 1994, Beauty and the Beast premiered on Broadway at the Palace Theatre in New York City to mixed reviews. The show transferred to the Lunt-Fontanne Theatre on November 11, 1999. The commercial success of the show led to productions in the West End, Toronto, and all over the world. The Broadway version, which ran for over a decade, received a Tony Award, and became the first of a whole line of Disney stage productions. The original Broadway cast included Terrence Mann as the Beast, Susan Egan as Belle, Burke Moses as Gaston, Gary Beach as Lumière, Heath Lamberts as Cogsworth, Tom Bosley as Maurice, Beth Fowler as Mrs. Potts, and Stacey Logan as Babette the feather duster.

Many well-known actors and singers also starred in the Broadway production during its thirteen-year run, including Kerry Butler, Deborah Gibson, Toni Braxton, Andrea McArdle, Jamie-Lynn Sigler, Christy Carlson Romano, Ashley Brown, and Anneliese van der Pol as Belle; Chuck Wagner, James Barbour, and Jeff McCarthy as the Beast; Meshach Taylor, Patrick Page, Bryan Batt, Jacob Young, and John Tartaglia as Lumière; Marc Kudisch, Christopher Sieber, and Donny Osmond as Gaston; and Nick Jonas, Harrison Chad, and Andrew Keenan-Bolger as Chip. The show ended its Broadway run on July 29, 2007, after 46 previews and 5,462 performances. As of March 2026, it is Broadway's eleventh-longest-running show in history.

=== Live-action remake ===
In June 2014, Walt Disney Pictures announced that a live-action film adaptation of the original animated film was in the works, with Bill Condon directing and Evan Spiliotopoulos penning the screenplay. Condon originally planned on not only drawing inspiration from the animated film, but also to include most, if not all, of the Menken/Rice songs from the Broadway musical, with the intention of making the film as a "straight-forward, live-action, large-budget movie musical". In September 2014, it was announced that Stephen Chbosky would re-write the script. In January 2015, Emma Watson announced via her Facebook page that she would portray Belle in the live-action film.

In March 2015, Dan Stevens, Luke Evans, Emma Thompson, Josh Gad, Audra McDonald, and Kevin Kline joined the film as the Beast, Gaston, Mrs. Potts, Lefou, Garderobe, and Maurice, respectively. (Note: Attributed to multiple references:) The following month, Ian McKellen, Ewan McGregor, Stanley Tucci, and Gugu Mbatha-Raw joined the cast, as Cogsworth, Lumière, Cadenza, and Plumette, respectively. (Note: Attributed to multiple references:) Composer Alan Menken returned to score the film's music, with new material written by Menken and Tim Rice. In June 2015, Menken said the film would not include the songs that were written for the Broadway musical. Filming began on May 18, 2015, in London, and at Shepperton Studios in Surrey. Production officially wrapped in August 2015. The film was released on March 17, 2017.

=== Beauty and the Beast at the Hollywood Bowl ===
In 2018, a live concert celebration took place at the Hollywood Bowl, directed by Richard Kraft and Kenneth Shapiro. The cast included Zooey Deschanel as Belle, Anthony Evans as the Beast, Taye Diggs as Gaston, Kelsey Grammer as Lumière, Rebel Wilson as LeFou, Jane Krakowski as Mrs. Potts, and Baraka May as Chip. They were accompanied by a live orchestra, singing songs from the original film.

=== Beauty and the Beast: A 30th Celebration ===
On July 5, 2022, ABC reported that a live-action/animation special was in development that would air on December 15, 2022, with Hamish Hamilton set to direct and Jon M. Chu as executive producer. ABC said that it would include live never-before-seen musical performances, along with new sets and costumes inspired by the classic story. On July 20, 2022, it was reported that H.E.R. was cast to play Belle. In September 2022, Josh Groban, Joshua Henry, and Rita Moreno, had been cast as the Beast, Gaston, and the narrator, respectively. David Alan Grier was later announced to play Cogsworth. During the month, Martin Short and Shania Twain entered final talks to play Lumière and Mrs. Potts, respectively. Rizwan Manji, Jon Jon Briones, and Leo Abelo Perry complete the cast as LeFou, Maurice, and Chip, respectively. On December 12, 2022, D23 revealed that Paige O'Hara (the original voice of Belle), Richard White (the original voice of Gaston), and composer Alan Menken would cameo in the special as, respectively, the Bookseller, the Baker, and a piano player during "Belle".

=== Gaston-focused live-action film ===
In December 2025, a new spin-off live-action film centering around Gaston was announced with David Callaham writing the script from a previous draft by Kate Herron and Briony Redman. The film will have a new actor portraying Gaston and will have 'swashbuckling' undertones.

== Merchandise ==
Beauty and the Beast merchandise cover a wide variety of products, among them storybook versions of the film's story, a comic book based on the film published by Disney Comics, toys, children's costumes, and other items. In addition, the character of Belle has been integrated into the "Disney Princess" line of Disney's Consumer Products division, and appears on merchandise related to that franchise. In 1995, a live-action children's series entitled Sing Me a Story with Belle began running in syndication, remaining on the air through 1999. Two direct-to-video followups (which take place during the timeline depicted in the original film) were produced by Walt Disney Television Animation: Beauty and the Beast: The Enchanted Christmas in 1997 and Belle's Magical World in 1998; in contrast to the universal acclaim of the original, reception to the sequels was extremely negative. Disney on Ice produced an ice version of the movie that opened in 1992 in Lakeland, Florida. The show was such a huge commercial and critical success, touring around the world to sell-out crowds, that a television special was made when it toured Spain in 1994. The show ended its run in 2006, after 14 years.

=== Video games ===
The first video game based on the film was titled Beauty and the Beast: Belle's Quest and is an action platformer for the Sega Mega Drive/Genesis. Developed by Software Creations, the game was released in North America in 1993. It is one of two video games based on the film that Sunsoft published for the Mega Drive/Genesis, the other being Beauty and The Beast: Roar of the Beast. Characters from the film like Gaston can help the player past tricky situations. As Belle, the player must reach the Beast's castle and break the spell to live happily ever after. To succeed, she must explore the village, forest, castle, and snowy forest to solve puzzles and mini-games while ducking or jumping over enemies. Belle's health is represented by a stack of blue books, which diminishes when she touches bats, rats, and other hazards in the game. Extra lives, keys and other items are hidden throughout the levels. While there is no continue or game saving ability, players can use a code to start the game at any of the seven levels.

The second video game based on the film was titled Beauty and the Beast: Roar of the Beast and is a side-scrolling video game for the Genesis. As the Beast, the player must successfully complete several levels, based on scenes from the film, to protect the castle from invading villagers and forest animals and rescue Belle from Gaston.

The third and fourth video games based on the film are action platformers developed by Probe Software and published by Hudson Soft. One, titled Beauty and the Beast, was released in Europe in 1994 for the NES, while the other, Disney's Beauty and the Beast, was released in North America in July 1994 and in Europe on February 23, 1995, for the SNES. The entire games are played through the perspective of the Beast. As the Beast, the player must get Belle to fall in love so that the curse cast upon him and his castle will be broken. The final boss of the game is Gaston. The Beast can walk, jump, swipe, stomp, super stomp, and roar, the last of which is used to both damage enemies and reveal hidden objects.

The fifth video game based on the film was titled Disney's Beauty and the Beast: A Board Game Adventure and is a Disney Boardgame adventure for the Game Boy Color. It was released on October 25, 1999.

Beast's Castle, a world based on Beauty and the Beast, appears in the video game series Kingdom Hearts. In the first game, the world has been destroyed and Belle kidnapped by the Heartless, led by Maleficent. The Beast travels to Maleficent's stronghold and works with Sora to defeat Maleficent and rescue Belle and the Princesses of Heart. In Kingdom Hearts II, Beast's Castle is restored and Xaldin manipulates Beast in an attempt to transform him into a Heartless. Beast eventually comes to his senses and works with Sora to defeat Xaldin. In the game's ending credits, the Beast turns back into the Prince. Beast's Castle also appears as a level in Kingdom Hearts 358/2 Days, and in Kingdom Hearts χ.

Belle and the Beast also appeared in Disney Dreamlight Valley, they first appeared in Update Seven: Enchanted Adventure. Lumiere and Cogsworth later appeared in Update Nineteen: Return to Beast’s Castle. Gaston was introduced in the Eternity Isle expansion pack.

== Follow-ups ==
The success of the film spawned two direct-to-video follow-ups: Beauty and the Beast: The Enchanted Christmas (1997) and Belle's Magical World (1998). A television series, Sing Me a Story with Belle (1995–1997), and another direct-to-video film, Belle's Tales of Friendship (1999), featured live-action actors as well as animation.

== See also ==
- List of Disney theatrical animated feature films
- List of Disney animated films based on fairy tales
