= Gaston (song) =

Song by Jesse Corti and Richard White

from the album Beauty and the Beast
- Released: 1991
- Genre: Waltz
- Length: 3:40
- Label: Walt Disney
- Composer: Alan Menken
- Lyricist: Howard Ashman
- Producers: Howard Ashman; Alan Menken

"Gaston" (from the character of Gaston) is a song from the 1991 Disney animated film Beauty and the Beast. A short reprise is performed later in the musical. It is sung by Jesse Corti and Richard White in their voice roles of LeFou and Gaston, respectively.

The song also appears in the 2017 live-action remake, where it is again performed by the characters of LeFou and Gaston, this time played by Josh Gad and Luke Evans, respectively.

== Synopsis ==
The musical number shows Gaston and the village people singing about how great he is, in an effort to cheer him up after Belle's rejection. Gaston's talent ranges from fighting, to spitting, to eating excessive quantities of eggs with no apparent negative health impacts, to interior decoration. Gaston, however, is portrayed as somewhat unintelligent, or at least as a relatively poor chess player. "Gaston (Reprise)"' sees Gaston hatch a plan with the help of LeFou to send Maurice to an insane asylum in order to force Belle to marry him in order to stop him.

== Composition ==
The Globe and Mail described the song as a "Lerner and Loewe-flavoured drinking song".

== Versions ==
In the theatrical version, the section where LeFou forgets how to spell Gaston's name was cut, but was retained in the soundtrack. It was reinstated in the 2017 live-action version, with LeFou explaining that he is illiterate.

The 2017 film includes lyric changes which Menken described as part of the original lyrics by Ashman that were cut from the animated film.

== Critical reception ==
Mayland Theatre Guide deemed it "one of the highlights of the show". The Herald Sun noted the song "delivers the punches of humorous lyrical accomplishment as well as memorable choreography". In a review of the musical version, The Globe and Mail said it "stops the show midway through Act 1". ColumbiaUnderground called it "the second best song and dance number of the musical".

SputnikMusic wrote "Ever one to recognize a true gem, Disney then decided to employ White and Corti for the subsequent song "Gaston" and its reprise as well. These numbers are from the scene in the local tavern just after Belle's capture by the Beast, and are perhaps best remembered for being the manliest songs in the entire film. White manages to come across as a pure paragon of maleness, sporting rippling musculature and bristling chest hair all at once. Herein, White comfortably busts out lines like "As you see I've got biceps to spare!" and "I'm especially good at expectorating - ptooey!" with much gusto. The gaggle of incompetent, second-rate buffoons in the background do a stunning job too, rolling out accompanying refrains like "No one plots likes Gaston!/Takes cheap shots like Gaston!/Likes to persecute harmless crackpots like Gaston!" to rousing effect. Take it from me - it's ridiculously hard to come out of this one without having the burning desire to eat five dozen eggs per day and become roughly the size of a barge."

Soundtrackgeek wrote "For me...not much can beat the musical and lyrical genius of Belle and Gaston and their respective reprises. The two greatest character pieces in Disney's canon, these tracks introduce the story and style of the film staggeringly well, showing brilliant lyrical detail and hilarity, as well as giving a sublime showcase for Menken's talents".
