= CultureMap =

British think tank

CultureMap is a British think tank that specialises in understanding SMEs or small businesses and entrepreneurs.

== History ==
CultureMap was founded in 2002. The organisation partnered with BMRB and the Durham Business School to develop the Business Culture Index (BCI).
