= Jesse Corti =

American actor

- Born: July 3, 1955 (age 71); Venezuela
- Occupations: Actor; theater director
- Years active: 1978–present
- Spouses: Laura Deberardino (m. 1986; died 1987) Julietta Marcelli (m. 1989)
- Children: 2

Jesse Corti (born July 3, 1955) is an American actor and theater director known for playing Courfeyrac in the original Broadway show Les Misérables and for voicing LeFou in Beauty and the Beast.

== Career ==
Corti also voiced the Spanish Dignitary in Frozen and Mr. Manchas in Zootopia. He has appeared in numerous feature films, and in several popular television series such as 24, Heroes, Desperate Housewives, The West Wing, Judging Amy, and Law & Order. In 1990, he received a Clio Award for his Drug Free America commercial. Corti has also directed various stage productions in Los Angeles.

== Personal life ==
Corti was previously married to Laura Lyn Deberardino, whom he wed in 1986. Deberardino was killed a year later in a 1987 collision between an Amtrak train and a Conrail freight train in Chase, Maryland. At that time, Deberardino had been returning to New York City after having seen her husband perform in Les Misérables at the Kennedy Center in Washington, D.C. The crew of the freight train tested positive for marijuana, and Corti subsequently appeared in both an English-language and a Spanish-language public service announcement for Partnership for a Drug-Free America.

== Filmography ==
=== Film ===
| Year | Title | Role | Notes |
|---|---|---|---|
| 1986 | Courage | Chico | Television film |
| 1986 | Florida Straits | Guido | Television film |
| 1987 | Heart | Herman's Trainer | |
| 1989 | High Stakes | Super | |
| 1989 | Night Life | Jose | Television film |
| 1990 | Revenge | Medero | |
| 1990 | Sesame Street Home Video Visits the Firehouse | Firefighter Emilio | Direct-to-video |
| 1991 | Beauty and the Beast | LeFou (voice) | Also Latin Spanish Dub |
| 1993 | Roosters | Unknown role (voice) | |
| 1994 | A Brilliant Disguise | Maitre D' | |
| 1995 | In the Kingdom of the Blind | Man on Cross | |
| 1996 | All Dogs Go to Heaven 2 | Charlie B. Barkin (voice) | Singing voice |
| 1996 | The Undercover Kid | Raven (voice) | |
| 1996 | Bid in a Window | Chinese Man, Red (voice) | |
| 1997 | The Corporate Ladder | Armand Kristopolous | |
| 1997 | MGM Sing-Alongs: Friends | Performer | Segment: "I Will Always Be with You" |
| 1997 | MGM Sing-Alongs: Searching for Your Dreams | Performer | Segment: "It's Too Heavenly Here"/"On Easy Street" |
| 2000 | Love & Basketball | Coach Parra | |
| 2000 | Gone in 60 Seconds | Cop at Quality Cafe | |
| 2000 | Last Mistake | Tony | Short film |
| 2000 | The Christmas Lamb | Issac, David (voice) | Television film |
| 2003 | Bringing Down the House | Italian FBI Agent | |
| 2003 | K10C: Kids' Ten Commandments | Jacob (voice) | |
| 2003 | Hulk | Colonel | |
| 2005 | Choker | Interviewer, Mr. Cater | |
| 2006 | The Visitation | Catholic Priest | |
| 2006 | All In | Jesus | |
| 2007 | A Modern Twain Story: The Prince and the Pauper | Studio Gate Guard | |
| 2008 | Stiletto | Hector Molinas | |
| 2009 | Playmobil: The Secret of Pirate Island | Sly (voice) | Singing voice |
| 2011 | Mia and the Migoo | Pedro, Wilford (vocie) | English dub |
| 2013 | Berserk: The Golden Age Arc I – The Egg of the King | Julius (voice) | English dub |
| 2013 | Frozen | Spanish Dignitary (voice) | |
| 2015 | Night of the Living Dead: Origins 3D | Newscaster (voice) | |
| 2016 | Zootopia | Mr. Manchas (voice) | |
| 2016 | Quackerz | Kianga (voice) | |
| 2026 | I Am Frankelda | Editor Damastes, Mr. Isidro (voice) | English dub |

=== Television ===
| Year | Title | Role | Notes |
|---|---|---|---|
| 1982 | Search for Tomorrow | Hold Up Man #2 | 2 episodes |
| 1987 | Kate & Allie | Charles | Episode: "Brother, Can You Spare a Dim" |
| 1989 | Men | Jesse Tanton | Episode: "Baltimore" |
| 1990–1993 | Law & Order | Angel Suarez, Alex Nunez | 2 episodes |
| 1991 | One Life to Live | Julio | 1991 episodes only |
| 1992 | The Little Mermaid | Additional voices | Episode: "The Evil Manta" |
| 1992 | The Tom & Jerry Kids Show | Additional voices | Episode: "Penthouse Mouse/12 Angry Sheep/The Ant Attack" |
| 1992 | Darkwing Duck | Cement Head (voice) | Episode: "Mutancy on the Bouncey" |
| 1992 | Super Dave: Daredevil for Hire | Additional voices | Episode: "The Fuji-tive" |
| 1993 | Bonkers | March Hare (voice) | 3 episodes |
| 1994 | Where on Earth Is Carmen Sandiego? | Additional voices | 10 episodes |
| 1996 | Gargoyles | Jade (voice) | Episode: "The Green" |
| 1997 | Walker, Texas Ranger | Drug Dealer #2 | Episode: "Last Hope" |
| 1997 | Rugrats | Various voices | 2 episodes |
| 1997 | Team Knight Rider | Maddox | Episode: "Choctaw L-9" |
| 1998 | The Wild Thornberrys | Crocodiles (voice) | Episode: "Only Child" |
| 1998 | Men in Black: The Series | Additional voices | Episode: "The Dog Eat Dog Syndrome" |
| 1999 | The Angry Beavers | El Supermuerto, Police Captain, Referee (voice) | Episode: "Noberto y Daggetto en 'El grapadura y el castor malo" |
| 2000 | JAG | Master Sgt. Manny O'Bregon | Episode: "People v. Gunny" |
| 2000 | Boy Meets World | Man | Episode: "Brotherly Shove" |
| 2000 | Max Steel | Additional voice | Episode: "Swashbucklers" |
| 2000 | The West Wing | Dave Stewart | Episode: "The Midterms" |
| 2001 | Godzilla: The Series | Paul Dimanche (voice) | Episode: "The Ballard of Gens Du Marais" |
| 2002 | 24 | Charles McLemore | Episode: "Day 1: 6:00 am – 7:00 am" |
| 2002 | As Told by Ginger | Dr. Juan, Running Doctor (voice) | Episode: "Mommie Nearest" |
| 2002 | Judging Amy | Lt. Daniels | Episode: "A Pretty Good Day" |
| 2002 | CSI: Miami | Dean of Students | Episode: "A Horrible Mind" |
| 2002 | Providence | Lt. Morris | Episode: "The Eleventh Hour" |
| 2003 | Robbery Homicide Division | FBI Agent Fonseca | Episode: "Vamonos Chica" |
| 2004 | Crossing Jordan | Detective Al Morris | Episode: "Slam Dunk" |
| 2004 | All Grown Up! | Male Judge (voice) | Episode: "Runaround Susie" |
| 2005 | Higglytown Heroes | Submarine Captain Hero (vocie) | 3 episodes |
| 2005 | The Batman | Chief Angel Rojas (voice) | 6 episodes |
| 2006 | Desperate Housewives | Social Worker | Episode: "It Wasn't Meant to Happen" |
| 2006 | Shark | Jim Ellis | Episode: "Fashion Police" |
| 2007 | Heroes | LAPD Police Captain Knox | Episode: "Chapter Thirteen 'The Fix'" |
| 2007 | The Shield | Galindo/Sr. | Episode: "The Math of the Wrath" |
| 2007–2012 | Handy Manny | Francisco, Ticks, Relando (voice) | 3 episodes |
| 2011 | Law & Order: LA | Victor Aguilar | Episode: "Westwood" |
| 2012–2014 | NFL Rush Zone | Drop Kick (voice) | 29 episodes |
| 2015 | Goldie & Bear | Itsy (voice) | Episode: "Tiny Tale" |
| 2022 | The Casagrandes | Ziggy (voice) | 2 episodes |
| 2023 | Pluto | Wagner (voice) | 1 episode |

=== Video games ===
| Year | Title | Role | Notes |
|---|---|---|---|
| 2004 | Metal Gear Solid 3: Snake Eater | Commander | English dub |
| 2005 | Resident Evil 4 | Bitores Mendez | English dub |
| 2005 | SOCOM U.S. Navy SEALs: Fireteam Bravo | Additional Chile AO Voices | |
| 2006 | Syphon Filter: Dark Mirror | Additional voices | Credited as Jessie Corti |
| 2006 | Just Cause | Caramona | |
| 2006 | Metal Gear Solid: Portable Ops | DCI | |
| 2007 | The Shield | Galindo/Sr. | |
| 2007 | Uncharted: Drake's Fortune | Mercenaries #4 | |
| 2007 | Lost Odyssey | Gongora | |
| 2010 | Metal Gear Solid: Peace Walker | Soldiers | |
| 2010 | Lost Planet 2 | Additional voices | |
| 2011 | Call of Juarez: The Cartel | Antonio Alvarez | |
| 2011 | Uncharted 3: Drake's Deception | Colombian Citizens | |
| 2013 | BioShock Infinite | Additional voices | |
| 2013 | Call of Juarez: Gunslinger | Additional voices | |
| 2013 | Lightning Returns: Final Fantasy XIII | Additional voices | |
| 2018 | Red Dead Redemption 2 | The Local Pedestrian Population | |
| 2018 | Just Cause 4 | People of Solis | |
| 2019 | Death Stranding | Deadman | |
| 2025 | Death Stranding 2: On the Beach | Deadman | |
| 2025 | Call of Duty: Black Ops 7 | Raul Menendez | |

=== Theme parks ===
| Year | Title | Role | Notes |
|---|---|---|---|
| 2020 | Beauty and the Beast Sing-Along | Lefou | Epcot attraction |

== Theatre ==
| Year | Title | Role | Notes |
|---|---|---|---|
| 1981 | El Bravo! | Jose Ensalada | |
| 1982 | Lullabye and Goodnight | Deputy | |
| 1986 | Lovers and Keepers | Performer | |
| 1987 | Les Misérables | Courfeyrac | |
| 2016 | Hairspray | N/A | Director |
