= Lego Disney Princess: Magical Mayhem =

2026 animated television special on Disney+

- Based on: Lego Disney; Disney Princess
- Developed by: Byron Howard; Elise Aliberti; Jonako Donley; Kyle Zabala; Liz Watson; Mandesa Tindal
- Written by: Rachel Vine
- Directed by: Randi Rodrigues; Jake Wilkinson
- Starring: Jodi Benson; Auliʻi Cravalho; Mandy Moore; Linda Larkin; Ming-Na Wen; Jim Cummings
- Composer: Steffan Andrews
- Countries of origin: United States; Denmark
- Original language: English

Production
- Executive producers: Jill Wilfert; Keith Malone; Pamela J. Keller; Jennifer Twiner McCarron; Robert Fewkes
- Editors: Jake Wilkinson; Sarah Fricker
- Running time: 22 minutes
- Production companies: The Lego Group; Atomic Cartoons

Original release
- Network: Disney+
- Release: August 21, 2026

Related
- Lego Disney Princess: The Castle Quest; Lego Disney Princess: Villains Unite

Lego Disney Princess: Magical Mayhem is a 2026 animated television special based on the Lego Disney toyline and Disney Princess franchise. It is a crossover between several characters featured in films produced by Walt Disney Animation Studios and the third installment in a series of Lego Disney Princess specials, preceded by Lego Disney Princess: Villains Unite (2025).

Lego Disney Princess: Magical Mayhem released on Disney+ on August 21, 2026 as part of World Princess Week.

== Plot ==
On a rainy day, Ariel, Moana, Rapunzel, Jasmine, and Mulan decide to shelter a bunch of animals until the storm clears. The Cheshire Cat sees this as an opportunity for mayhem and spawns a surplus of animals that invade the castle, confusing the five princesses. While trying to keep the peace, Ariel has to save Flounder from being eaten by a crocodile. Following a trail of ants, the princesses find the Wardrobe's portal as the source of the animals, though unbeknownst to them the Cat has possessed her. When the Cat gets close to being exposed, he sends out a stampede of elephants that the princesses have to chase out of the castle. Afterwards, the Cat floods the castle with water.

After opening the castle doors to let the water escape, the Cat covers the entire castle in thick vines. To get out of the vines, the Magic Mirror summons Snow White to break the princesses out and joins the group. The chaos caused by the Cat causes the castle's foundation to begin to fail, and the princesses need an additional guide to help the animals escape. Their help comes from Mushu. Snow White ends up staying inside the castle but is rescued by birds before she can fall to the ground. Regrouping, Snow White figures out it was the Cheshire Cat's doings and after he is confronted, uses his powers to rebuild the castle, expanding it to include new sections, which the princesses love. In a subplot, Abigail and Amelia Gabble watch the chaos unfurl in real time and view it as a live performance.

== Voice cast ==
- Jodi Benson as Ariel
- Auliʻi Cravalho as Moana
- Katherine Von Till as Snow White
- Mandy Moore as Rapunzel
- Linda Larkin as Jasmine
- Ming-Na Wen as Mulan
- Jim Cummings as:
  - The Cheshire Cat
  - Kaa
- Issac Robinson-Smith as Mushu. Smith reprises his role from the video game Disney Dreamlight Valley (2023).
- Carson Minniear as Flounder
- Kaitlyn Robrock and Haley Clair as Abigail and Amelia Gabble
- Corey Burton as the Magic Mirror
- Jo Anne Worley as Wardrobe
- Michael Gough as Beaver
- Jamieson Price as Epic Announcer

Other characters who appear include the Magic Brooms from Fantasia, Tick-Tock the Crocodile from Peter Pan, the Magic Carpet and Rajah from Aladdin, Pascal from Tangled, and Heihei and Pua from Moana.

== Reception ==
=== Critical response ===
Alex Reif of Laughing Place, commented about the special: "Fast-paced and fun, LEGO Disney Princess: Magical Maghem continues the adventures that started in 2023's LEGO Disney Princess: The Castle Quest and last year's LEGO Disney Princess: Villains Unite. Presumably, next year’s special will delve deeper into the latest version of the castle, which really only appears at the end of the story. But for now, whether you’re playing along or just enjoying it on its own merits, there’s plenty of fun to be had."

Polly Conway of Common Sense Media gave Lego Disney Princess: Magical Mayhem a grade of three out of five stars, saying: "This special advertises mayhem, and mayhem it delivers. Lego Disney Princess: Magical Mayhem presents a chaotic adventure with lots of action and some cute nods to classic and modern Lego sets. On that subject, kids may be interested in actual Lego sets after watching this special. With six princesses sharing the spotlight, everyone gets a little moment to shine, and the princesses' relationships with their pets are cute to watch as well. There's not a ton of depth to this one, but it's fast-paced princess fun for Disney fans."
