= Gaston (Beauty and the Beast) =

Fictional character from Disney's Beauty and the Beast

- Beauty and the Beast character
- First appearance: Beauty and the Beast (1991)
- Created by: Linda Woolverton
- Voiced by: Richard White
- Portrayed by: Wolf Bauer (1995–1997); Luke Evans (2017 film); Joshua Henry (Beauty and the Beast: A 30th Celebration); Burke Moses (Original Broadway cast of stage musical); Hugh Jackman (Original Australia stage musical)

In-universe information
- Occupation: Professional hunter
- Affiliation: Disney Villains
- Children: Gaston II (in Descendants); Gaston the Third (in Descendants); Gil (in Descendants)
- Nationality: French

Gaston is a fictional character and the main antagonist of Walt Disney Pictures' animated film Beauty and the Beast (1991). Voiced by American actor and singer Richard White, Gaston is an arrogant and ruthless hunter whose unrequited feelings for the intellectual Belle drive him to kill his adversary, the Beast, once he realizes she cares for him instead. Gaston serves as a foil personality to the Beast, who was once as vain as Gaston prior to his transformation.

Gaston is a character original to Disney, as he is not present in the original fairy tale. Imagined by screenwriter Linda Woolverton, Gaston was developed specifically for Disney's adaptation of Beauty and the Beast because the studio felt that the film could benefit from a strong villain, who is lacking in the original story. As the character evolves from a non-threatening aristocrat into an arrogant man relentlessly seeking Belle's hand in marriage, Gaston ultimately replaced a female relative of Belle's who the filmmakers had originally created to serve as the film's villain.

In direct contrast to his adversary the Beast, Gaston is depicted as physically handsome with an unattractive personality, both physically and emotionally embodying hypermasculinity. Both Disney and supervising animator Andreas Deja initially struggled with the concept of animating a handsome villain, which had never been attempted by the studio before. Deja ultimately based Gaston's appearance on those of handsome soap opera actors in order to create a grotesque version of the Prince Charming stock character, while some of White's own operatic mannerisms were incorporated into the character.

Gaston has been generally positively received by film critics, as his lack of "magic power or political influence" means that his villainy tends to resonate with audiences who often identify someone similar to him in real life, although some critics regard him as a less memorable villain than some of the studio's previous efforts.

== Development ==
=== Conception and writing ===
Gaston is one of several elements unique to The Walt Disney Company's animated adaptation of the Beauty and the Beast fairy tale, written by Jeanne-Marie Leprince de Beaumont. Under Richard and Jill Purdum's direction, Gaston originally resembled a "foppish aristocrat" as opposed to the strong, arrogant hunter he would ultimately be revised into; The Huffington Post described early drafts of Gaston as "a weaselly, sort of wimpy character." In fact, Gaston was originally intended to resemble more of an annoying than antagonistic character, while the main villainous role belonged to Belle's aunt Marguerite instead, who plotted to force Belle into marrying Gaston. This version of Gaston was abandoned along with much of the original film treatment's elements, including Marguerite, at the behest of Disney chairman Jeffrey Katzenberg.

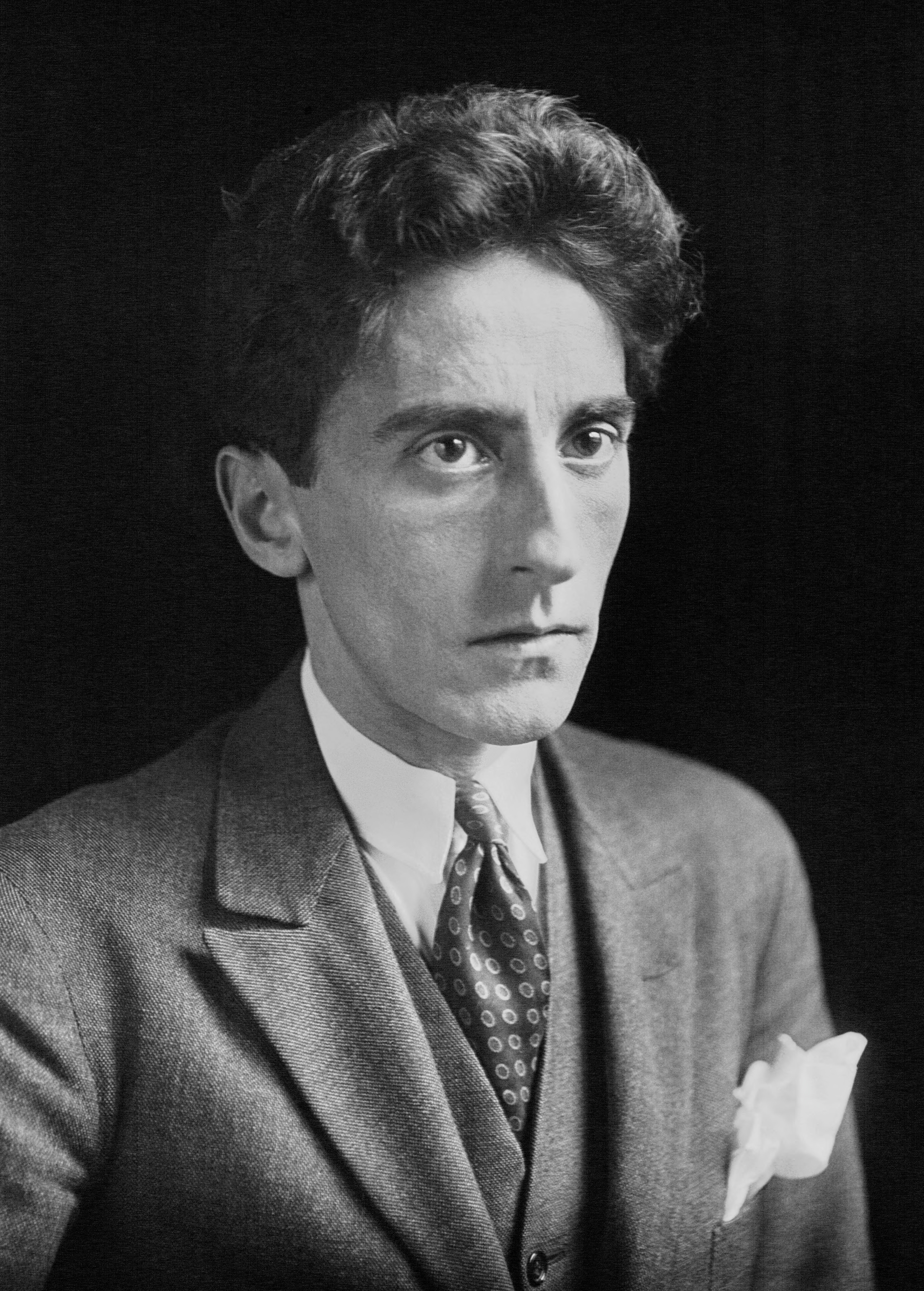
French filmmaker Jean Cocteau, who created the character Avenant for his 1946 live-action adaptation of the fairy tale; a character that would inspire Disney's Gaston

After Katzenberg insisted that development on the film be completely overhauled, the studio ultimately decided to incorporate elements from filmmaker Jean Cocteau's 1946 film adaptation of the fairy tale into their own version of Beauty and the Beast. Gaston, a character who does not exist in the original fairy tale, was among several elements borrowed from the live-action version of the story, based on a character Cocteau himself had created specifically for his film: Avenant, portrayed by French actor Jean Marais who also plays the Beast in a dual role. Similar to Cocteau's addition of Avenant, Gaston was created for the animated adaptation because Disney felt that the story could potentially benefit from a legitimate villain, which the original text lacks, in addition to instilling Beauty and the Beast with a more prominent element of danger. With Marguerite eliminated, Gaston replaced her and ultimately became a more formidable villain. Thomas S. Hischak, author of Musicals in Film: A Guide to the Genre, observed that Gaston himself had been developed as "a new kind of Disney villain" because he is introduced as a harmless, comic individual who gradually changes and evolves into a much more sinister character as the film progresses. With its handsome villain and liberated heroine, both of whom had been developed into fully realized, multi-dimensional characters, finally established, Beauty and the Beast's storyline began to solidify. However, some filmmakers continued to contest whether or not Gaston was actually a strong enough villain.

In addition to eliminating Belle's sisters, screenwriter and creator Linda Woolverton introduced Gaston as a "blockheaded suitor" for the heroine, basing the character on boyfriends she had dated in the past. Several darker elements originally conceived for the film were ultimately written out of the final version, among them the idea of Gaston himself first visiting the insane asylum in which he plans on imprisoning Belle's father Maurice. After Woolverton re-wrote Belle into a more liberated Disney heroine, the animators struggled to realize the screenwriter's vision and briefly depicted the character shoving Gaston into a closet after he proposes to her, an idea Woolverton strongly contested and fought to have written out of the film in favor of Belle rejecting her suitor's proposal in a less "bitchy" way. During Gaston and the Beast's climactic battle, the character was originally intended to yell "Time to die!" to his opponent, but the writers ultimately replaced this line with "Belle is mine!" in order to return some of the scene's focus to the heroine of the story, over whom the two men are fighting. The writers also briefly deliberated having Gaston kill himself once he realizes that Belle will never love him, but this idea was also quickly discarded. Small skulls were drawn in Gaston's eyes as he descends from the Beast's castle to confirm that he does, in fact, die from his fall.

=== Voice and animation ===
Disney hosted an open casting call for the character, which several actors attended. Among the actors who auditioned for the role was Rupert Everett, who Disney decided not to cast because the filmmakers felt that he did not sound arrogant enough to voice such a proud character; Everett would ultimately go on to voice Prince Charming, a similar character who appears in the Shrek film series, using the critique of not sounding arrogant enough to play Gaston to secure the role in Shrek 2 (2004), although Charming's motives and vindictive traits were more in resemblance to that of Jafar's (as he only wanted Princess Fiona for the throne and seized it in the same manner). American actor and opera singer Richard White was selected to voice Gaston. His initial audition was first recorded on audio cassette, a copy of which was then forwarded to Disney. White's feature film debut, the actor recalled that lyricist and executive producer Howard Ashman guided him through discovering how he would approach voicing Gaston without telling him exactly how to do it, describing having the opportunity to voice a character like Gaston as "freeing... cathartic, in a way." Although White did not feel like it was necessary for him to physically "become" his character in order to voice him, in retrospect, he admits that he acted much more like Gaston during recording sessions. Dave Kehr of the Chicago Tribune compared White's "brash" vocal performance to that of actor Howard Keel.

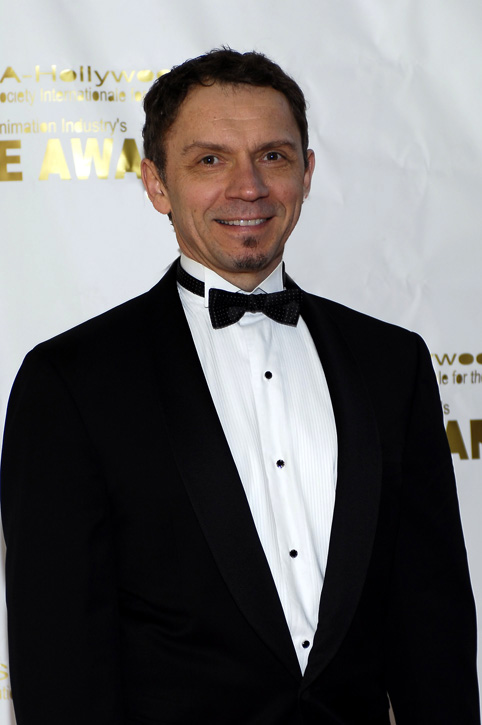
Gaston was the first villain that supervising animator Andreas Deja animated for Disney. Deja originally struggled to realize executive Jeffrey Katzenberg's vision of a handsome villain.

Andreas Deja served as Gaston's supervising animator. The first villainous character to whom Deja had been assigned by Disney, the animator immediately recognized that Gaston was unique in terms of Disney villains because he was not designed to frighten both the film's hero and audience, as previous Disney villains had been. In the case of Gaston, Deja stated that viewers are unable to immediately decipher whether or not the character is actually an antagonist based on his physical appearance alone. White agreed that Gaston is "full of himself, of course, but he's not recognizably villainous" until his opinions and expectations of Belle are further explored. Deja initially struggled with the idea of designing a "supremely handsome" villain, a specific instruction administered to him by Katzenberg, but he eventually grew to understand the concept upon studying the film's underlying themes of not judging a book by its cover and "deceptive appearances". Deja explained, "I understood him from a story point of view, but visually was hard", and at times argued with Katzenberg over whether or not the character was handsome enough. Some Disney executives also shared Deja's initial hesitation over the character's appearance. Deja ultimately overcame his deliberations about the character's appearance by modeling Gaston based on handsome soap opera actors, a creative decision Katzenberg approved of, explaining to the animator "the story we're trying to tell here is don't judge a book by its cover, so Gaston has to have the opposite qualities of the Beast...no one said it was going to be easy!'".

White's casting ultimately influenced Gaston's design; the animators adjusted the character's appearance after hearing White's operatic singing voice for the first time, making Gaston similarly operatic in his movements, gestures and mannerisms. According to White, Gaston's early designs initially looked "much more Brutish" before the animators ultimately decided to go in a "more beautiful" direction, basing the character "on a grotesque version" of the Prince Charming character. Describing the design process as highly collaborative between actor and animator, White would record his lines while the animators drew his character, alternating back and forth for several months. This process allowed the animators to incorporate White's acting performance into Gaston. Because White continued to perform on Broadway while working on Beauty and the Beast, Disney would accommodate his stage career by hiring a studio to work wherever he was located. White recalled, "The experience is kind of like an actor's sandbox. You're in a room by yourself and are invited to be as creative as you can be. Anything you could imagine...they could draw!" In his book Tradigital Animate CC: 12 Principles of Animation in Adobe Animate, author Stephen Brooks observed that Deja's challenge "was to let [audiences] know that Gaston is not as courageous as everyone says he is ... but also keep him a real and credible threat" since he is a villain nonetheless.

Both Gaston's personality and physical appearance evolved dramatically during production over the course of two and a half years. Deja incorporated physical attributes of several of Disney's "classic" villains into Gaston's design, specifically the wide chest and square jawline of Captain Hook from Peter Pan (1953). One particular challenge of animating a realistic-looking character like Gaston was the difficulty of having him express certain emotions that would not result in him looking too "cartoony," but at the same time trying to instill the character's performance with "life." Gaston's expressions were exaggerated to the point of which they exceeded normalcy, essentially "overacting." Deja recalled that he was constantly "walking a fine line by drawing and animating Gaston in subtle ways, yet he also had to be able to articulate emotions like arrogance, anger and evil." To make Gaston a multi-dimensional character, Deja worked to incorporate various "expressions—the sarcasm, the broadness and the expressiveness—that the handsome leading man seldom gets to show". According to Den of Geek's Simon Brew, Gaston is "animated really carefully, as it would have been easy to slip, and allow us to see the less jovial, more sinister side of his character earlier." Deja maintains "a real discipline here in holding Gaston back, to let the audience hook into him, before allowing his gradual slide." Deja also exaggerated Gaston's proportions to help audiences believe that the character could actually physically face the beast head-on. In terms of research, Deja sought inspiration from male Los Angeles residents who constantly adore themselves, observing them as they fix their hair and admire themselves in mirrors, explaining, "It was fun to observe them and bring some of that attitude to Gaston." Creating the character's chest hair, which he exposes during his performance of "Gaston", was a fiercely debated subject among animators. Deja described early renditions of the character's chest hair as "peculiar" in design because of the way in which it was combed, "from the inside out." The final version was decided via a contest, in which the animators vied to determine who could best design Gaston's chest hair. Colors were used to indicate characters' emotions and affiliations in the film; while Gaston is dressed in red to represent evil, Belle and the Beast wear blue to depict goodness. Following Gaston's success, Deja would develop a reputation of animating Disney villains, continuing with Jafar from Aladdin (1992) and Scar from The Lion King (1994).

== Characteristics and themes ==
=== Inner beauty and superficiality ===
Gaston is depicted as a very narcissistic, self-centered and superficial individual, motivated by extreme jealousy. Identified as the film's villain by the Orlando Sentinel's Joy Boyar, Gaston is not ugly in appearance, nor does the audience realize that he is a villain until approximately midway through the film and during "The Mob Song", a musical number he uses to convince his loyal followers to storm the Beast's castle and kill him, although traces of his villainy are first hinted after he proposes to Belle. Simon Brew of Den of Geek attributes Gaston's increasing villainy to "his raging jealousy and insecurity" that ultimately "transforms him into the story's antagonist" after he finally succumbs to "circumstance[s] of his life." The character's villainy peaks after he attempts to have Maurice incarcerated, although his transformation remains far from complete. Further distinguishing Gaston from the Evil Queen, the villain in Disney's Snow White and the Seven Dwarfs (1937), the character does not undergo a hideous physical transformation before he dies. Mania.com's Rob Vaux observed that Gaston is "small-minded" in comparison to other Disney villains because his ideas tend to resemble those of school bullies, particularly one whose ego has been inflated "by the people around him," as opposed to "grand schemes;" the character has no known desire to conquer the world, lacking ambitions beyond simply marrying the woman he is attracted to. The character is also void of both magical powers and political influence. The Huffington Post's Lauren Duca agreed that Gaston is "more aggressively intolerable than horrifying."

Beloved by nearly every character in the film, most of whom revere him as the town's most eligible bachelor, Decent Films film critic Steven D. Greydanus agreed that Gaston initially resembles "merely the ultimate dumb jock". Gaston's bodybuilder physique serves as a deliberate exaggeration upon "the stereotyped image of male beauty"; The Meanings of "Beauty and the Beast": A Handbook author Jerry Griswold compared the character's appearance to actors Sylvester Stallone and Arnold Schwarzenegger, while the Chicago Tribune's Gene Siskel described him as a "Robert Goulet clone on steroids." Tradigital Animate CC: 12 Principles of Animation in Adobe Animate author Stephen Brooks likened Gaston's exaggerated facial expressions to the way in which people "give away their lies as they try to overcompensate." According to Elizabeth Bell, author of From Mouse to Mermaid: The Politics of Film, Gender, and Culture, Gaston "functions...to contrast to the Beast", whose personality ultimately helps make the Beast a more appealing hero despite the latter character's own flaws. While the Beast maintains "a heart of gold" despite being hideous in appearance, Gaston boasts a handsome exterior but remains "rotting on the inside"; the Beast risks becoming like Gaston on the inside if he fails to change his ways. Gaston represents "the difference between outward beauty and beauty of the soul," one of the film's central themes. The fact that Gaston's cruel nature is not mirrored by his handsome exterior "further emphasiz[es] the film's message about inner beauty." A visual reference to the Beast's "half-man, half-animal" appearance, Gaston's body is temporarily attached to a pig's head when he falls into a large mud puddle upon having his marriage proposal rejected by Belle. Ultimately, although Gaston mortally wounds the Beast, he is still unable to kill the human who continues to thrive within him. In the end, Gaston becomes the monster the Beast was originally depicted as, and his failure "to transform into a New Man" ultimately results in his own death. At the same time, Gaston's cowardice is demonstrated by his decision to stab the Beast in the back immediately after the reformed creature offers him a choice to walk away unharmed.

From very early during the film, audiences are led to expect that Gaston's obsession with Belle will eventually drive him to battle the Beast, Belle's love interest and protector. Despite their obvious differences, Gaston and the Beast boast several similarities, namely their shared interest in Belle—Gaston's climactic fight with the Beast is driven by the fact that both characters are in love with the same person, albeit differently—exaggerated musculature, and respective goals motivated by their own insecurities. Additionally, both characters use Belle's loyalty to her father to manipulate her. The scene in which Gaston sits in his large chair in the village tavern is a reference to him and the Beast's similarities. Decorated with fur and horns, Gaston's chair resembles the Beast when viewed from behind. In his book The Meanings of 'Beauty and the Beast': A Handbook, author Jerry Griswold observed that "given the dramatic contrast between Gaston and the Beast ... the title of the film may actually refer to them alone." In her book Beyond Adaptation: Essays on Radical Transformations of Original Works, author Phyllis Frus observed that the villain's subtle, entirely non-physical transformation into a more demonic version of himself forces the character to suffer a "loss of humanity", in the end justifying his ultimate death. By the end of the film, Gaston has essentially traded places with the Beast, the latter of whom was originally depicted as the story's antagonist. Frus elaborated, "few viewers predict that" Gaston "will finish the film snarling like an animal ... before falling to his death", concluding that the character "does not need to magically turn into a beast at the end because, as a male, he is already 'beastly'."

=== Masculinity and misogyny ===
Beauty and the Beast parodies the idea of excessive masculinity, a trait shared by both Gaston and the Beast. Obsessed with his own virility, Gaston shares several opinions associated with "the hyper-masculine male", boasting many "traditionally heroic" qualities and beliefs. Representing "everything that can go wrong in the heterosexual male" according to The Meanings of "Beauty and the Beast": A Handbook author Jerry Griswold, Gaston is essentially a caricature of hypermasculinity; he proudly hunts, drinks, fights, spits, bullies and lies in addition to being shallow and ignorant, exuding what are considered to be some of the worst masculine traits. Gaston intimidates and threatens anyone opposed to his ideas, and actively attends male social gatherings via which he can exercise his "alpha male" status. Extremely egotistical, Gaston appears to pride himself as the greatest at any task he attempts. Stephen Hunter of The Baltimore Sun wrote, "at the foundation of [Gaston]'s personality is something that is merely hinted at in conventional star personas: an overweening vanity. He's in love with the face in the mirror, and the pathology of male vanity is a very '90s idea."

Gaston is Disney's most chauvinistic villain to-date, although this trait is approached with humor, making him at times a comic relief character early on, unlike Disney's previous villains. According to Yahoo! Movies' Will Perkins, Gaston believes that "he's God's gift to women and the world." Referred to as a personification of misogyny, Gaston is accustomed to acquiring anything he desires, and believes he deserves to marry Belle only because she is considered to be the most beautiful girl in his hometown, and thus "the best." According to Practicing Passion: Youth and the Quest for a Passionate Church author Kenda Creasy Dean, the character "only understands love as self-fulfillment, which allows him to perpetrate domination, viciousness and violence" in pursuit of it. Greg Garrett, author of The Gospel According to Hollywood, determined that Gaston serves as "a reminder that what the world loves is not worth emulating". Determined to win Belle as a trophy wife, Gaston never attains her; the character's ego is sorely bruised when his vision of a provincial life is threatened by Belle's rejection, only augmenting his determination to marry her at whatever cost, and bringing his insecurities to the forefront for the first time. Gaston fails to understand Belle's passion for reading. Gaston effectively uses his charm, good looks and a fabricated image of the Beast to rally the entire village against his opponent, demonstrating his ability to convince others that he is a gentleman despite never actually having shown concern for anyone other than himself; only Belle remains unfazed by Gaston's facade and uncovers his true nature, further highlighting the heroine's strength and independence. Opposed to the idea of women reading, Gaston believes that he'll be able to "cure" Belle of her thirst for intellect after marrying her, although at the same time these same passions appear to heighten his interest in her. The film makes sure that Gaston's opinions about women are viewed as little more than "boorish"; Woolverton wanted Gaston to teach young boys "how not to treat women."

As a strong leader, Gaston is able to convince a large following to do as he commands and trigger conformity and bigotry in others, although he remains incapable of implementing such ideas on his own. Richard Corliss of Time observed that the character's "bigotry, for wanting to marry Belle because she's the prettiest girl in town...corrodes into malevolence when he consigns Belle's eccentric father to an asylum and leads the ignorant villagers on a torches-and-pitchforks crusade," which has been compared to scenes from the horror film Frankenstein (1931). Brett Seegmiller of Medium compared Gaston's leadership skills to those of German politician Adolf Hitler because he combines "a call to action with the command to follow him ... after he's whetted our appetites for some action." Additionally, author Jerry Griswold wrote in his book The Meanings of "Beauty and the Beast": A Handbook that Gaston's hypermasculinity potentially "amounts to a resistance to his own homosexuality" (after all, he is in love with himself), comparing him to Lester Burnham's homophobic neighbor in the film American Beauty (1999). Toying with gender expectations, Gaston's masculinity is depicted as ridiculous, while Belle becomes drawn to the Beast's "gentle vulnerability". The Beast gifting Belle a library further emphasizes the differences between the two male characters because Gaston frowns upon reading, accusing the activity of giving women ideas and allowing them to think for themselves as opposed to solely bearing children. Ultimately, Gaston and the Beast embody bad and good masculinity, respectively; the characters are used "to play the New Age sensitive man off against the macho man," according to Ways of Being Male: Representing Masculinities in Children's Literature author John Stephens.

== Appearances ==
=== Animated portrayal ===
Gaston debuted in Beauty and the Beast as an arrogant hunter who is determined to marry Belle, whom he considers to be the village's most beautiful woman. However, she refuses his proposal when he throws a wedding party without her prior knowledge. Belle is the only one in town who actually dislikes Gaston for the person he is inside. Thoroughly humiliated, he sulks, but when her father Maurice shows up saying that she has been captured by a hideous Beast, he comes up with the idea of having him thrown into an insane asylum, unless Belle agrees to marry him. His blackmail plan fails when Belle proves the Beast does exist, and she says that he is her friend, and that he is a better person than Gaston. He becomes jealous, snaps, and decides to gather a band of villagers to kill the Beast, playing off their fears that the Beast might wreak havoc on their village. In the ensuing fight, he shoots the Beast with an arrow and beats him down, taunting him about his appearance, and still refusing to believe that Belle will not marry him. The Beast has no heart to fight until he sees that Belle came back for him, at which point he easily overpowers Gaston and intends to kill him. However, when Gaston begs for his life, the Beast decides to be the better man and have mercy, and climbs back up to Belle. Ungrateful and unrepentant, Gaston stabs the Beast in the back when he sees him embracing Belle, but loses his balance when the Beast swings his arm backwards at him; consequently, Gaston falls to his death.

Gaston has appeared in the television series House of Mouse, and was voiced again by White. He makes sporadic appearances, mostly acting as a comedic foil, always stating "No one (insert action) like Gaston!" while walking by, rudely interrupting people's conversations. Variants of this phrase are frequently used by other characters.

Gaston appears as the main antagonist in Lego's animated special, Lego Disney Princess: The Castle Quest, released on Disney+ on August 18, 2023. He returns as one of the antagonists in the 2025 sequel Lego Disney Princess: Villains Unite.

=== Live-action portrayals ===
==== Beauty and the Beast (2017) ====
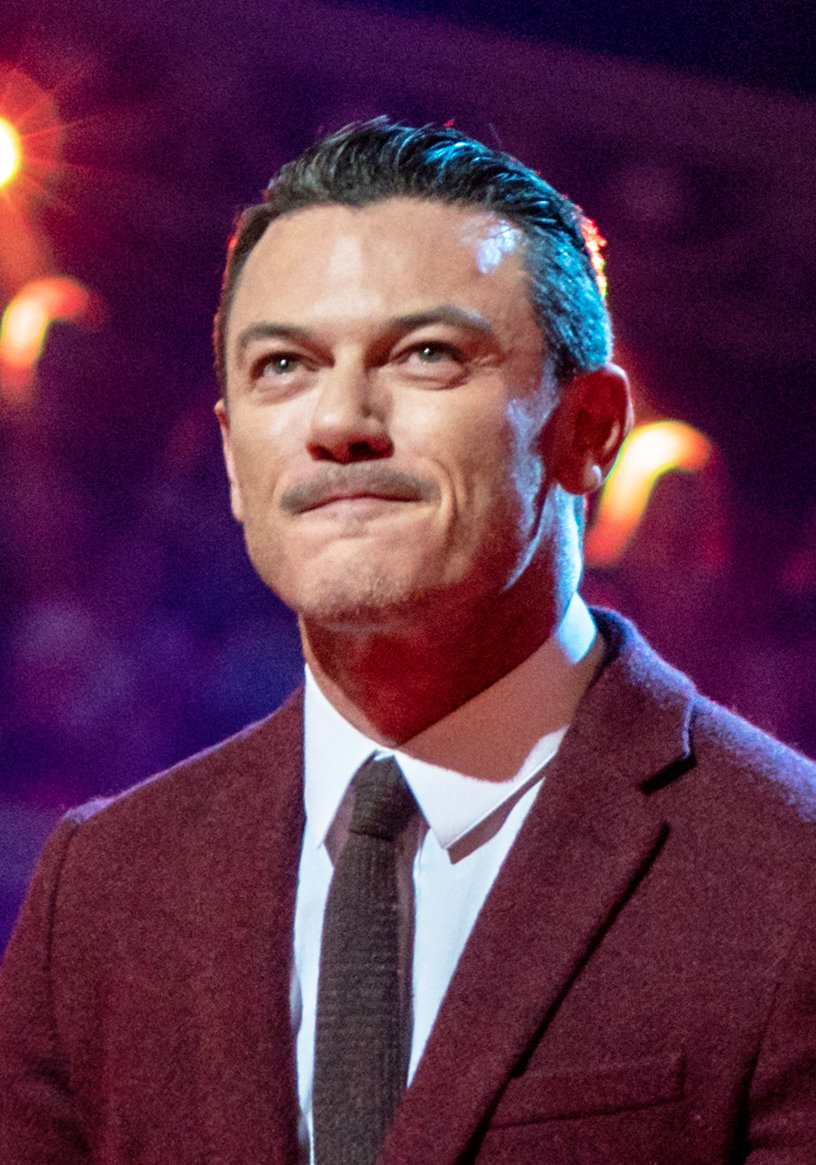
Luke Evans

Gaston appears in the 2017 live-action remake, played by Luke Evans. In an interview with Empire, Evans said that Gaston would retain his hunter background, yet would also be a former soldier in the French Royal Army. He also implied that this version of Gaston is darker than the original. In the film, Gaston plays out the same role as in the animated film, though with a few differences. A Captain in the light cavalry, Gaston is a hero to the village, but he is bored with his peaceful life after returning from the war. Gaston pursues Belle, determined to marry her, as she is the most beautiful girl in the village and thus the only one good enough for him. He also finds her independence to be a thrilling challenge, and shows disdain for the Bimbettes who constantly fawn over him purely because of his appearance. When the headmaster and Clothilde catch Belle teaching a girl how to read, they rouse some of the villagers into destroying the laundry invention she made which LeFou informs Gaston about. Gaston breaks up the activity as Pére Robert helps Belle pick up her laundry. While unaware on how this transaction towards Belle started, Gaston scolds the villagers for behaving like this and orders them to go home immediately. At one point, Gaston mentions in a discussion to Belle that the headmaster did not like him at first. He accosts her at her home, subtly offering his hand in marriage for when Maurice dies, but she turns him down. Gaston sulks in the tavern until LeFou cheers him up with a song. Maurice appears, claiming that Belle has been imprisoned by the Beast. While Gaston does not believe in the Beast, he offers to help Maurice in order to find out where Belle has gone.

Unfortunately, the way to the castle is blocked, and Gaston loses his temper with Maurice, revealing that he is violent, rough, and demanding. LeFou tries to calm him down, but it is too late; his true nature is revealed and Maurice tells Gaston that he will never let him marry Belle, so Gaston ties him to a tree, leaving him to the wolves. He hopes by doing this, it would coerce Belle into marrying him, as he tells LeFou that after Maurice dies there will be no one to take care of Belle except for him. Maurice later accuses Gaston of his crime, but Gaston fools the people into thinking Maurice is mad and arranges for him to be locked up in the asylum. He privately offers to put a stop to it if he lets him marry Belle, but Maurice still refuses. When Belle turns up and proves the Beast's existence with a magic mirror, Gaston's jealousy drives him to rally the people to storm the castle and kill the Beast, but not before he orders Tom, Dick, and Stanley to lock Belle alongside her father to prevent her from warning the Beast. He confronts the Beast alone and shoots him in the back, claiming Belle sent him. However, Belle appears and the Beast fights back, holding Gaston over a chasm; Gaston begs for mercy and is spared. Instead of leaving, Gaston stands on a nearby stone bridge and shoots the Beast again, twice, this time fatally. As a result of the Beast's life fading, the castle begins to crumble and the bridge where Gaston is standing breaks into pieces, sending Gaston falling to his death into the water below. Unlike in the animated film, Gaston's demise is shown on screen.

Evans was set to reprise his role in a Beauty and the Beast spin-off/prequel series for Disney+, but it was postponed indefinitely due to creative and scheduling issues. Luke Evans would end up playing a second Disney Villain in a "live action re-imagining", in this case The Coachman in Pinocchio.

==== Other appearances ====
Gaston in the Sing Me a Story with Belle episode "What's Inside Counts", portrayed by Wolf Bauer.

A live-action version of Gaston appears in two episodes of the fantasy television series Once Upon a Time, in which he is first portrayed by Sage Brocklebank and later by Wes Brown. The first was in the first season episode "Skin Deep", where he was Belle's fiancé and attempted to save Belle from Rumplestiltskin, but got transfigured into a rose. The second time was in the fifth season episode "Her Handsome Hero", where he befriended Belle. He was depicted in a lighter manner compared to the original movie, where it is implied that his love for Belle was genuine.

=== Stage productions ===
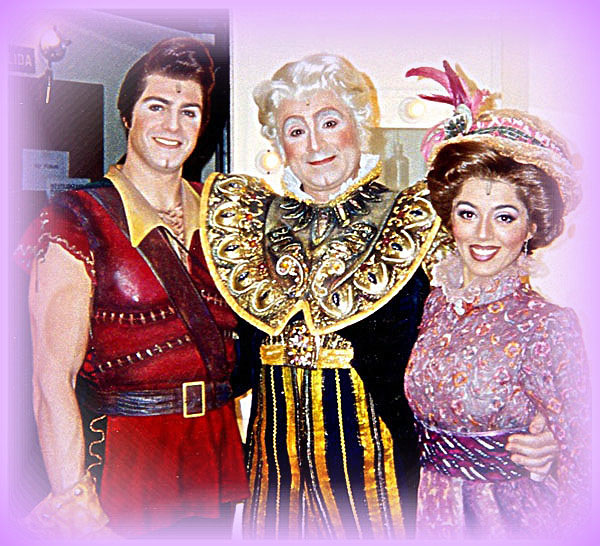
Spanish actor Lisardo (Left) as Gaston

Gaston appears in the Broadway musical adaptation of Beauty and the Beast, which premiered at the Palace Theatre on April 18, 1994. The role was originated by actor Burke Moses, who received a nomination for a Drama Desk Award and won a Theatre World Award. Besides the songs "Belle", "Gaston", and "The Mob Song" (which are from the Disney film), Gaston performs "Me" (in which he selfishly proposes to Belle), "Gaston (Reprise)" (which was expanded to have Gaston and Lefou sing about his wicked plan, with Gaston also admitting he "won't feel the least bit remorseful" so long as it works), and "Maison de Lunes" (in which he recruits the asylum owner to have Maurice committed).

In the Melbourne stage production of the film, he was played by Hugh Jackman. Notable actors who have played the role on Broadway include Burke Moses, Marc Kudisch, Christopher Sieber, and Donny Osmond. Notable actors who have played the role on the West End and the UK tour include Burke Moses, Stephen Matthews, Tom Senior, and Earl Carpenter.

=== Literary portrayals ===
Gaston is featured in the Marvel Comics serial for Beauty and the Beast, taking place during Belle's stay at the castle. He generally served as comic relief and effectively the "protagonist" of the village B-stories, where he is trying to come up with some scheme to get Belle to marry him, only for the triplets to interfere and sabotage his plans in order to get him to focus on them over Belle.

He also appears in an expanded role in Serena Valentino's 2014 book The Beast Within: A Tale Of Beauty's Prince, which takes place prior to the start of the original film. In the novel, Gaston and the Beast are portrayed as childhood friends, with the curse erasing Gaston's memory of the prince. Gaston also appears in the 2016 book As Old as Time: A Twisted Tale, which serves as an alternate take on the film's story. He has a brief cameo in the fourth Kingdom Keepers book, where he alongside Prince John and Horned King were present with the Overtakers at Tom Sawyer Island. He also had a section dedicated to himself in the tongue-in-cheek book Villain Files alongside the other Disney villains, with it implying that his meeting Belle was during archery practice.

He is also in Descendants: Isle of the Lost, the tie-in novel to Descendants, where he has four kids. Two of whom, Twins Gaston Jr and Gaston the Third, he evidently named after himself due to his egomania. Gil his youngest son who appears in Descendants 2 and Descendants 3. They also shared his egomania to some extent but were comparatively kinder than their father.

=== Video-game portrayals ===
He is included in the 1993 video game adaptations Beauty & The Beast: Belle's Quest and Beauty & The Beast: Roar of the Beast. Although he acted as the main antagonist for both games, he also acted as an ally character in the former, using his strength to help in a task early in the game. In the Disney Princess video game, he acts as the main antagonist of Belle's chapter. Like in the film, he attempts to rabblerouse the villagers into attacking the castle. This time, however, he simply tries to convince the villagers the castle was evil and of dark magic, and thus needed to be destroyed, and to that end tried to abduct Mrs. Potts, Chip, Cogsworth, and Lumiere to act as proof. However, Belle outsmarted him.

He also had a mention in Kinect: Disneyland Adventures, and also appeared briefly as a disguise for the villain Mizrabel in Epic Mickey: Power of Illusion. Gaston also appears as a non-playable character in the Kingdom Hearts video game Kingdom Hearts χ as an antagonist who controls an army of Heartless. Gaston is a playable character to unlock for a limited time in Disney Magic Kingdoms. An alternate version of Gaston appears as a playable character in the video game Disney Mirrorverse. He is an unlockable racer in Disney Speedstorm and appears as a villager in Disney Dreamlight Valley.

== Reception and legacy ==
Gaston has received generally favorable reviews from film critics. Simon Brew of Den of Geek was very receptive towards the character: "thanks to a mix of humour, believable character development, compelling motivation and the excellent voicing work of Richard White (proving you don't need a big movie star on voice duties), he's an utterly compelling antagonist, and an extremely interesting one." Writing for Entertainment Weekly, Owen Gleiberman hailed Gaston as "a wonderful character", while The Daily Beast lauded the character as "a triumphantly funny villain". The New York Times' Janet Maslin described Gaston's "fatuousness" as "well conveyed" while praising White's performance, writing that the actor "do[es] wonders in bringing ... Gaston to life." Writing for IndieWire, Drew Taylor felt the fact that Gaston is "a strapping cad" as opposed to a witch or hideous creature contributes to making the film "a wholly unique experience". Reviewing the film 25 years after its original theatrical release, Creative Loafing's Matt Brunson admitted that he "never grow[s] tired of watching the boorish Gaston". The Seattle Times' John Hartl called White "hilarious" as Gaston.

However, critical opinions of Gaston have been rather lackluster in comparison to those of other, more acclaimed Disney villains; reviewers generally prefer Scar, Maleficent and Jafar. While dubbing Gaston's characterization "one of the movie's cleverest touches", at the same time Stephen Hunter of The Baltimore Sun felt that the character lacks the charisma of some of Disney's earlier female villains, namely the Evil Queen and Cruella de Vil from Snow White and the Seven Dwarfs (1937) and One Hundred and One Dalmatians (1964), respectively. Time's Richard Corliss called Gaston "a way-too-handsome galoot" and "Dudley Do-Right gone wrong." Hal Hinson of The Washington Post felt that Gaston was "overbearing" because "everything about him is comically exaggerated and satirized to the point that you feel as if the cleft in his chin might swallow you whole." In her book From Mouse to Mermaid: The Politics of Film, Gender, and Culture, author Elizabeth Bell reviewed Gaston as a "Chauvinist Pig, the kind that would turn the women of any primetime talkshow audience into beasts themselves." Similarly, The Media and the Models of Masculinity author Mark Moss accused the character of uttering "the most anachronistic nonsense heard on the screen for quite some time." JoBlo.com reviewed Gaston as an "inferior villain", writing, "While White's performance is terrific, the character itself is ultimately basic and bland." Jaime N. Christley of Slant Magazine dismissed the character as juvenile and little more than the film "reducing every aspect of its source material to the level a kindergartner would understand". Film critic Roger Ebert described Gaston as too "insufferable" as he "degenerates ... from a chauvinist pig to a sadistic monster", but at the same time cited White among the film's "gifted cast".

Gaston is considered to be one of Disney's "classic" villains, as well as one of the studio's most famous. Prior to Gaston's debut, virtually every Disney villain before him had been unattractive in appearance; Den of Geek writer Simon Brew holds Gaston accountable for changing the reputation of future Disney villains. The character's villainy tends to resonate with audiences more than those of other Disney villains because fans can often identify someone similar to him in real life. Medium contributor Brett Seegmiller strongly believes that "Gaston is one of the best villains in the Disney canon" because audiences both respect and fear him, as well as the best leader in his opinion. MTV crowned Gaston "Disney's smarmiest villain", while Thomas S. Hischak, author of Musicals in Film: A Guide to the Genre, dubbed him "one of Disney's most fiendish human villains". Crowning the character the "Most Terrifying Disney Villain of All", Bustle's Mary Grace Garis praised Gaston's depiction of a misogynistic villain: "because Gaston is the walking embodiment of patriarchy at its most comically aggressive, anyone ... from a 3-year-old to a 23-year-old can look at him and be like, 'THAT. That's the enemy.'," with Gaston being easier to relate to than other Disney villains due to him lacking "magic power or political influence" and being "just your everyday alpha-male trying to mansplain to you when you're just trying to live your life".

Gaston frequently appears within the top-tens of Disney villain rankings organized by various media publications; however, he is usually placed closer towards the middle of these countdowns and seldom ranks number one. E! ranked the character the sixth best Disney villain. TVOvermind also ranked Gaston sixth despite his lack of magical powers "because of his overwhelming douchebaggery" whose "general intolerance makes for a terrific villain." On The Huffington Post's "Definitive Ranking Of 25 Classic Disney Villains", Gaston was featured at number eight, while About.com placed the character ninth on a similar list. Yahoo! Movies included Gaston at number 11 on their ranking of "the 12 most famous Disney villains from worst to best", awarding him "points for not only being a huge jerk, but for also trying to blackmail Belle into marrying him ... and for leading a mob to kill Beast." According to the Orlando Sentinel, Gaston is the 12th-greatest Disney villain. Meanwhile, on Babble's list of "The Top 15 Disney Villains Ranked from Bad to Worst", which ranked the characters based on scariness, Gaston was placed 10th. CNN agreed that Gaston is one of "Disney's scariest villains", writing, "the only thing worse than a cocky, demanding guy who can't take a hint is a cocky, demanding guy who organizes a mob to kill your boyfriend", concluding, "He may not have looked scary, but he was obviously the movie's real beast." Featured among Collider's "9 Most Wicked Animated Villains", contributor Matt Goldberg hailed Gaston as "a delightful caricature of an idiotic jock." Facetiously, Beamly considers Gaston to be among "8 Disney villains who are better than the heroes" for catching their attention despite being an "awful and sexist" character. Moviefone was less receptive towards the character, ranking him 25th out of 30 on their list of the "Top Disney Villains of All Time". Oh My Disney ranked Gaston's line "The most beautiful girl in town, that makes her the best! And don't I deserve the best?" the ninth-most-sinister quote uttered by a Disney villain.
