= Rapunzel (Tangled) =

Fictional character from the 2010 animated film Tangled

- Tangled character
- First appearance: Tangled (2010)
- Based on: Rapunzel by the Grimm Brothers (1812)
- Adapted by: Glen Keane
- Voice: Mandy Moore; Delaney Rose Stein (young) (Tangled); Kelsey Lansdowne (Kingdom Hearts III); Belle Adams (Sofia the First: Royal Magic)
- Portrayer: Teagan Croft (live-action film)

In-universe information
- Title: Princess of Corona
- Affiliation: Disney Princesses
- Family: King Frederic (father); Queen Arianna (mother); Mother Gothel (acting mother); Cassandra (foster sister)
- Spouse: Flynn Rider
- Relatives: Willow (maternal aunt); King Edmund (father-in-law); Queen of the Dark Kingdom (mother-in-law)
- Nationality: Kingdom of Corona

Rapunzel is a fictional character in Disney Animation's Tangled (2010). Based on the title character from the Brothers Grimm fairy tale of the same name, Rapunzel is a young princess kept unaware of her royal lineage by Mother Gothel, a vain woman who kidnaps her as a baby to hoard her hair's healing powers and remain young forever. A song is needed to activate the healing powers. Raised in a secluded tower, Rapunzel escapes with a wanted thief, Eugene "Flynn Rider" Fitzherbert, who promises to help her see the elusive floating lights in time for her 18th birthday, in exchange for a crown she has hidden from him. She is voiced by actress and singer Mandy Moore.

Created and animated by supervising animator Glen Keane, the character was adapted into a less passive heroine for the film by removing her from the confines of the tower. The character was originally to have been voiced by actresses Kristen Chenoweth and Reese Witherspoon, who eventually left the project and were replaced by Moore. Keane based her personality and interests on those of his own daughter, specifically painting. Special software was used to animate Rapunzel's 70 feet of long hair.

Critical reception of Rapunzel has been generally positive, with critics complimenting her spirited, lively personality and independence. The tenth Disney Princess, Rapunzel was officially inducted into the line-up on October 2, 2011, becoming the franchise's first CGI-animated member and the first European princess in 20 years, the last being Belle from Beauty and the Beast (1991). Her appearance and personality have drawn much comparison between her and one of the preceding Disney Princesses, Ariel from The Little Mermaid (1989), by whom she was inspired.

== Development ==
=== Creation ===
Veteran Disney animator Glen Keane had planned to adapt the Brothers Grimm fairy tale "Rapunzel" into a feature-length animated film as early as 1996. Keane was drawn to the idea of directing an animated adaptation of "Rapunzel" because he was especially intrigued by the concept of someone being "born with this gift inside of her and it had to come out", which he found similar to his experience working at Walt Disney Animation Studios. Keane eventually resigned from his position as director after suffering a heart attack in 2008, and he was replaced by Nathan Greno and Byron Howard. Keane remained closely involved with the film, serving as both an executive producer and Rapunzel's supervising animator.

"The development of a character for me is a very personal journey. For me the joy of creating a character that I believe is real is at the heart of creating a memorable character. I use people I know as inspiration. It's a very intimate personal process and I will do hundreds, sometimes thousands, of drawings in finding that design. There is a great “aha" moment when I finally recognize the character on my paper as someone I know."
— Keane, on the process of creating Rapunzel.

Walt Disney himself had attempted to adapt "Rapunzel" shortly after the release of the studio's first feature-length animated film Snow White and the Seven Dwarfs (1937), but the project was shelved due to challenges developing its story, much of which is confined to a single tower. To overcome this dilemma, Tangled's writers were forced to conceive a plan to remove Rapunzel from her tower. Originally, the film was called Rapunzel Unbraided, which Keane described as "a Shrek-like version" that revolved around a remarkably different premise. According to actress Kristin Chenoweth, who was originally cast as this early version of Rapunzel, the character was intended to be a squirrel at some point during development. However, Keane ultimately decided the film would benefit from a more sincere, genuine retelling of the original story, and the film was completely retooled.

As directors, Greno and Howard found it essential that Rapunzel be less passive than her fairy tale depiction, explaining that they wanted their version to be a role model for the contemporary audience the film was intended for: "We wanted all this girl power and to really drive this story, so she doesn't wait around for anything ... she's a smart girl, she has these hopes and dreams and she's going to get what she wants out of life". At the time it was being made, Tangled's production was surrounded by rumors and speculation that it would be Disney's final "princess film", which would have effectively made Rapunzel their last Disney princess. The studio confirmed that Tangled was their last princess film for the "foreseeable future", which they attributed to audience's changing interests, big-budget franchises dominating the box office, the commercial underperformance of the previous year's The Princess and the Frog (2009), and wanting to expand beyond the fairy tale formula Disney had been known for decades.

=== Voice ===
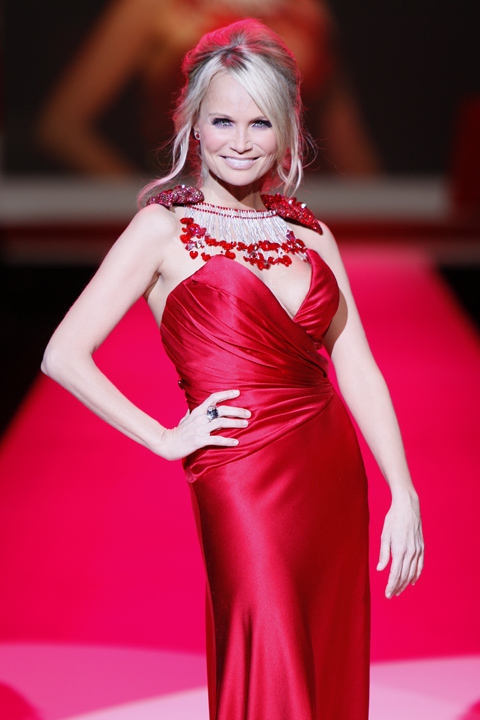
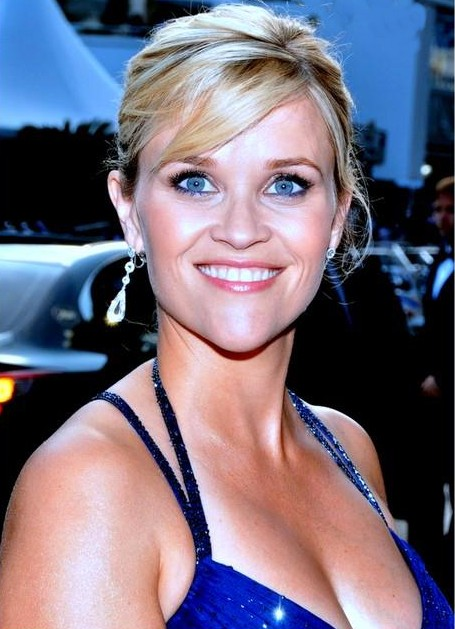
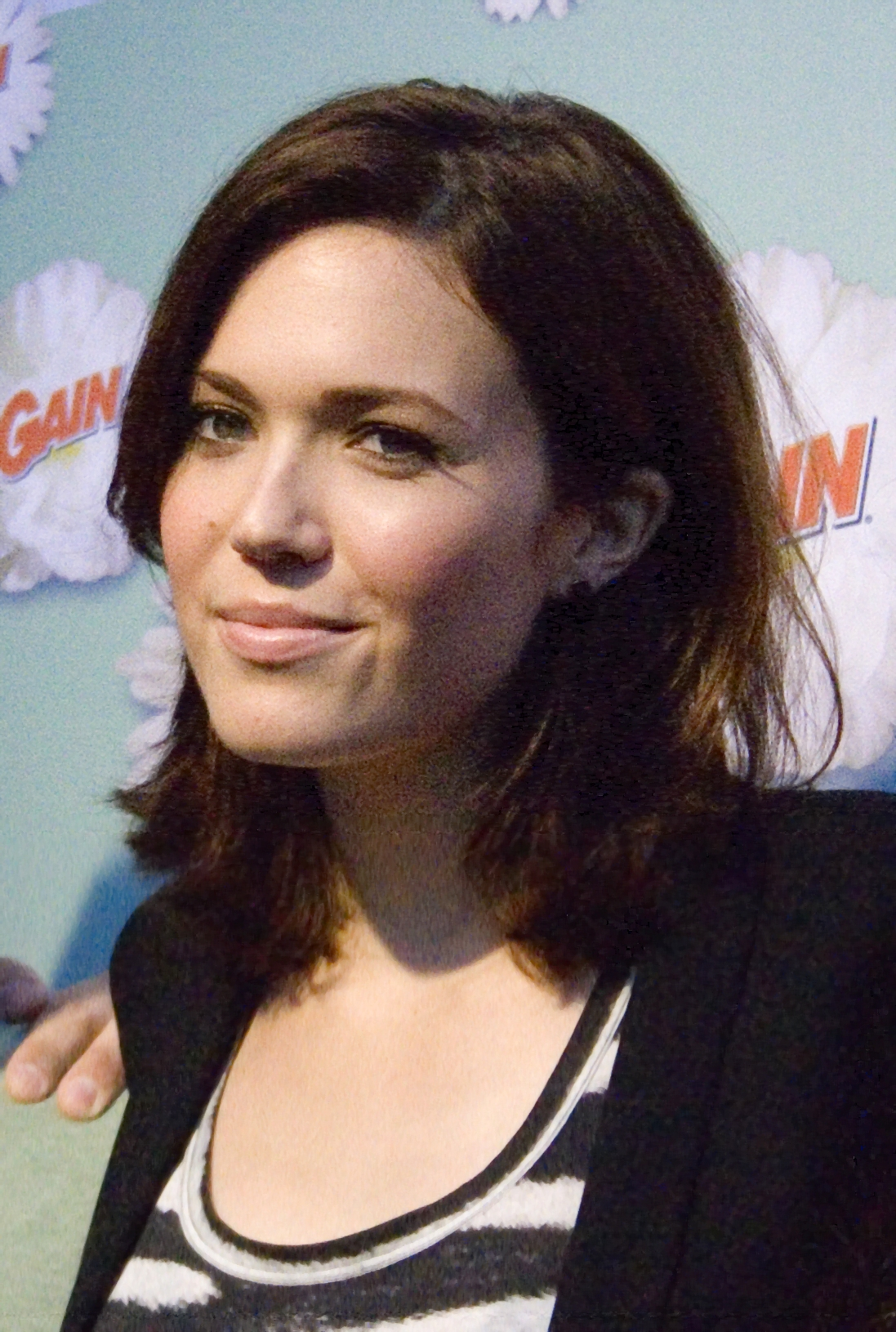
Actresses Kristin Chenoweth (left) and Reese Witherspoon (center) were originally cast as Rapunzel before Mandy Moore (right).

In 2004, actress and singer Kristin Chenoweth was cast as the original voice of Rapunzel while the film was still called Rapunzel Unbraided under Keane's direction. At one point, Disney had been considering casting actress Reese Witherspoon. Some media outlets reported that Chenoweth and Witherspoon would actually be sharing the role, while The Guardian reported that Witherspoon would be voicing "a modern girl who gate-crashes Rapunzel's fairytale world". Additionally, Witherspoon was intended to be an executive producer on the film, a position the studio had offered her to convince the actress to accept the role. However, Witherspoon eventually exited the project due to alleged creative differences over the film's script, claiming the project is "no longer the film that Reese had originally signed on to do". Following Witherspoon's resignation, Rapunzel remained uncast for quite some time, further jeopardizing the film's already belabored production, a period during which the character's voice was temporarily provided by "friends around the studio" in lieu of actors.

The directors continued to audition hundreds of young actresses to find Rapunzel's voice, among them Idina Menzel and Kristen Bell (who both were eventually cast as Disney Princesses Elsa and Anna in the Frozen franchise respectively), but none sounded quite right until they discovered Mandy Moore. A long-time Disney fan, Moore nearly deterred herself from auditioning because the role was heavily coveted at the time. Once she decided to audition, Moore pursued the role heavily, auditioning twice. Because the film is a musical, all auditonees were asked to perform a singer-songwriter style of their choice; Moore auditioned with a cover of Joni Mitchell's "Help Me". According to Howard, her voice possesses a soul and "down-to-earth, girl-next-door quality that makes her everything you could hope for in a Disney heroine". Moore barely worked with co-stars Zachary Levi and Donna Murphy, who voiced Flynn Rider and Mother Gothel respectively, never meeting Murphy and having met Levi only once to record their duet "I See the Light". Moore was surprised to learn that she would be working alone against initial expectations that "we're all going to be chummy, hanging out at the studio laughing and going out to dinner together". She had little idea what her character looked like because, in terms of visual aid, she was only shown rough, incomplete sketches and storyboards, relying on her imagination and the directors' input for "everything else".

Moore was often required to re-record a single line at least four times, from which the directors would select the best version. After watching the completed film for the first time, Moore was disappointed with her own performance, feeling she sounded "shrill". According to composer Alan Menken, Moore's musical background made her "a delight to work with". Moore found singing in character challenging compared to recording her own music, explaining, "I can't just be like Mandy and sing something the way that I want to necessarily, because you know, you sort of have to stick to certain guidelines". She found recording "When Will My Life Begin" particularly difficult due to its speed, and cites both Menken and discovering Rapunzel as a character with guiding her through the process. Child actress Delaney Rose Stein was eventually cast as a young version Rapunzel.

=== Personality and design ===
"With Rapunzel I did an enormous amount of drawings and I wanted to keep a sense of asymmetry in her. I read a book about feminine beauty and it said the key to beauty is strangeness in a woman's face. There needs to be something slightly off, some element; it might be her nose, her lip, her tooth, or one eye higher than the other, but something. Even in Rapunzel's teeth, the way she talks, there's something a little bit wonky in the placement of her teeth, and things like that were designed so that she was more real, true and appealing."
— Keane, on designing Rapunzel and the concept of "feminine beauty".

Executive producer John Lasseter explained that one of the main challenges encountered when developing Rapunzel's personality was making her "feel like a smart, clever, educated, healthy, fun human being", despite the fact that the character had not left her tower for 18 years. According to Brooks Barnes of The New York Times, Rapunzel's personality marked a significant departure from traditional Disney heroines. Moore believes Rapunzel is an atypical Disney princess because she is an independent character who "can take care of herself", in addition to being oblivious to the fact that she is a princess. Moore also said: "I like to think of her as the bohemian Disney princess. She's barefoot and living in a tower. She paints and reads… She's a Renaissance woman".

Keane designed Rapunzel under the tutelage of veteran Disney animator Ollie Johnston, one of Disney's Nine Old Men. Johnston advised Keane to capture what Rapunzel is thinking as opposed to simply animating what the character is doing after reviewing one of his early pencil tests. Keane compared hearing this advice to receiving a "slap that I never forgot, so when I was drawing over people's work, I really tried to get into the head of the thinking of the character". Howard was inspired by Ariel from Disney's The Little Mermaid (1989), a character who was also animated by Keane. The director elaborated that "Ariel was the first character that I ever thought there was a soul behind her eyes", which they wanted to replicate with Rapunzel "to find some sort of soul and depth that people could relate to". Meanwhile, Keane observed that Ariel and Rapunzel also share "irrepressible" spirits while encountering barriers that prevent them from pursuing their dreams. Keane was inspired by a book he read about the idea of feminine beauty; the book cited "strangeness" as "the key to beauty ... in a woman's face." Taking this into consideration, Keane maintained a sense of asymmetry while drawing Rapunzel, incorporating into her face several subtle imperfections, specifically her bucked teeth. The character was also drawn with freckles, making her the first Disney princess to have this feature. Keane designed Rapunzel with large eyes to convey her "irrepressible quality", a trait he also discovered in Moore's voice. Rapunzel is depicted as a barefooter, and Moore was barefoot herself while recording her lines. Although Moore has observed some physical similarities between the character and herself, she maintains that Rapunzel's appearance was developed long before she became involved with the project, dismissing any similarities as "coincidental".

Keane is known for basing his characters on members of his family; Rapunzel's passion for art and painting was inspired by his daughter, Claire. Several of Claire's original drawings and paintings are used to decorate Rapunzel's tower. While Keane was working on Tangled, Claire gave birth to his first grandchild, Matisse, whose appearance served as the animator's inspiration for the infant Rapunzel.

==== Hair ====
"The hair ... proved to be one of the film's biggest challenges. Because Rapunzel's mane is her ticket (it heals wounds, serves as transportation and makes the girl a prize to her captor), it had to look real on screen. To create it, the director says, animators created a series of tubes that looked like spaghetti. 'It's about 1,000 tubes or 100,000 actual hairs. The artists were able to get a general movement from those tubes.'"
— The Sioux City Journal, interviewing Howard and Greno.

Rapunzel was the first blonde Disney animated heroine since Aurora in Sleeping Beauty (1959). Animating Rapunzel's hair using computer-generated imagery has been regarded as the most challenging aspect in the development process of Tangled. According to the Los Angeles Times, supervising animator Glen Keane has become well known for animating some of Walt Disney Animation Studios' "greatest hair hits" since 1989, including Ariel from The Little Mermaid, the Beast from Beauty and the Beast (1991) and Pocahontas from Pocahontas (1995). Keane advised the technical team to avoid approaching hair as though it were a technical problem, reminding them that hair " represents an outward manifestation of the character's problem on every movie that I had done". He explained that Rapunzel's hair represents her enormous undiscovered potential. Both Keane and Howard have expressed similar opinions on Rapunzel's hair, with Keane describing it as "this constant reminder that she has this gift". As directors, Howard and Greno provided the animators with much live-action material and reference to use as inspiration for the appearance of Rapunzel's hair, such as attaching long strands of string to a baseball cap that they would take turns wearing in the studio and moving around it. Additionally, they recruited women who had not cut their hair in several years to serve as live models.

Senior Software Engineer Dr. Kelly Ward, a hair simulation major and graduate from the University of North Carolina, was placed in charge of developing special software meant to assist the animators in animating 70 to 75 feet of hair. Ward revealed that, in real life, the character's hair would weigh roughly 60 pounds, "more weight than a real person would be able to move around as effortlessly as we allow Rapunzel to do in the movie". For simplicity, the animators reduced the realistic total of 100,000 individual strands of hair found on a typical human head to a more manageable 100 for Rapunzel. Acquiring the unique but realistic shade of golden blonde for Rapunzel's hair also proved challenging to the animators.

== Appearances ==
=== Film and television ===
==== Tangled (2010) ====
Rapunzel first appears in Tangled as an infant princess who is born to a queen. Having inherited the healing abilities of a magical flower the ailing queen ingested while pregnant, the night after the princess is born she is kidnapped by a vain old woman named Mother Gothel, who from then on uses Rapunzel's hair to remain young and beautiful. Gothel raises the princess in an isolated tower, from which Rapunzel sees the release of thousands of floating lanterns, unaware that they are the kingdom's attempt to guide her home. As her eighteenth birthday arrives, Rapunzel grows increasingly eager to leave the tower and see the lights, and blackmails a wanted thief named Flynn Rider to take her there in her mother's absence. However, Gothel soon learns of Rapunzel's disobedience and pursues them, hiring a pair of thieves to incapacitate Flynn.

Rapunzel and Flynn eventually arrive at the kingdom in time for the lantern ceremony. Soon afterwards, Flynn is ambushed and turned in to the police by his former partners-in-crime, the Stabbington brothers, whom he abandoned in an attempt to outrun the king's soldiers, and is sentenced to death. However, before the Brothers can harm Rapunzel, Gothel knocks them unconscious and takes a heartbroken Rapunzel back to the tower.

Back in her bedroom, Rapunzel suddenly regains subconscious memories of her true identity and rebels against Gothel. However, Gothel, unwilling to lose Rapunzel, traps her. When Flynn escapes and arrives at the tower to save Rapunzel, Gothel stabs him. Desperate to save him, Rapunzel promises to do whatever Gothel pleases in return. Gothel complies, but just before Rapunzel can heal him, Flynn cuts her hair short with a mirror shard, causing it to turn brown and lose its magical powers, causing Gothel to age suddenly before she falls to her death. Flynn apparently dies in Rapunzel's arms, but the flower's magic manifests itself through Rapunzel's tears and revives him. Flynn returns Rapunzel to the palace, where she is finally reunited with her parents.

At the end of the film, Flynn accepts his birth name, Eugene Fitzherbert, and reveals that he has proposed to Rapunzel.

==== Tangled: Ever After (2012) ====
In this 6-minute short film, the entire kingdom is preparing for Rapunzel's marriage to Eugene. Several guests are in attendance, including Rapunzel's birth parents, the King and Queen, the pub thugs and the Stabbington Brothers, while their animal friends Pascal, a chameleon, and Maximus, a horse, serve as the Flower boy and ring bearer, respectively. Just as a brown-haired Rapunzel, accompanied by her father, completes her journey down the aisle to unite with Eugene, Maximus, who is carrying the wedding rings on a pillow in his mouth, has a reaction to one of Pascal's flower petals and sneezes, expelling the rings down the aisle and out onto the city streets.

Desperate to retrieve them, Pascal and Maximus sneak out of the chapel while Rapunzel and Eugene say their wedding vows. After pursuing the rings on a tumultuous pursuit around the kingdom and encountering several obstacles along the way, they finally manage to recover them from a flock of flying doves, crashing into a tar factory in the process. Pascal and Maximus return to the chapel just as the bishop asks for the rings. Though shocked by their tar-covered appearance, Rapunzel and Eugene exchange rings nonetheless and share a kiss. Exhausted from their previous endeavors, Maximus sits down, nudging the wedding cake in the process and causing it, which has been positioned on wheels, to roll down the aisle.

==== Frozen (2013) ====
Rapunzel and Eugene have a cameo appearance on Elsa's coronation day. Rapunzel is shown at the front gates grand opening as Anna runs out singing "For the First Time in Forever".

==== Sofia the First ====
In the special "The Curse of Princess Ivy", Called upon by the Amulet of Avalor, Rapunzel rescues Princess Sofia and Princess Amber from a crevice by letting them climb her 70-foot-long blonde hair. Flying back to Enchancia on one of the dragons, she teaches Amber about the consequences of her actions toward Sofia, in the form of a song, "Risk It All" and refers to Eugene it in. She then gives Amber one final piece of advice: "If you truly love your sister, you'll know what to do when the time comes" and vanishes back to Corona. Mandy Moore reprises her role from the film as well.

It was announced in April 2026 that Rapunzel will appear in the sequel series to Sofia the First, entitled Sofia the First: Royal Magic, with Rapunzel providing "wisdom and guidance" with the protagonist, Sofia. Belle Adams voiced Rapunzel in this series

==== Tangled: Before Ever After (2017) ====
Rapunzel is adjusting to her new life as the princess of Corona six months after the events of Tangled. Rapunzel's coronation is set to happen in a few days. Her father restricts her freedom, prepared to not lose his daughter once more. In the middle of all this stress, on the night of the royal banquet, Eugene publicly proposes to Rapunzel, but she rejects it, feeling she is not sure if she is interested to stay at the palace after marriage and that she needs to sort out her life first. On that night, she is sneaked out from the kingdom by her lady-in-waiting, Cassandra, so that she can get her mind off her problems. When Cassandra shows her the place where the mystical golden flower that saved her mother and herself was found, she touches one of the mystical rock spikes that started to sprout around a year ago, causing her 70 feet long blonde hair to grow back, and possessing new abilities. The story continues as she is confronted by a known enemy of the kingdom on her coronation day, and is forbidden to leave the walls of Corona without her father's consent. In her bedchamber, Rapunzel is determined to fill her journal with her own adventures, and solve the mystery of her hair's miraculous return.

==== Rapunzel's Tangled Adventure (2017–2020) ====
Rapunzel appears in the animated television series. Most of the first season is set on her uncovering the mystery of her new hair and its connection to the mystical rock spikes she had discovered several weeks ago, with the help of her lady-in-waiting Cassandra (who later turns out to be Mother Gothel's daughter, which also makes her Rapunzel's adoptive sister), and a young scientist named Varian. In addition, she tries her best on how to be a good princess and future queen of Corona, even though her naive and gullible ways often get her into trouble.

==== Ralph Breaks the Internet (2018) ====
Rapunzel, alongside other Disney Princesses, appeared in the film Ralph Breaks the Internet, as was announced at the 2017 D23 Expo.

==== Lego Disney Princess specials ====
Rapunzel appears as one of the main characters in Lego's animated special, Lego Disney Princess: The Castle Quest, released on Disney+ on August 18, 2023. She also appears in the 2025 sequel, Lego Disney Princess: Villains Unite.

==== Once Upon a Studio (2023) ====
Rapunzel appears in the short film, Once Upon a Studio. She is shown helping Mickey Mouse save Clarabelle Cow from being hypnotized by Kaa by knocking Kaa out with her pan and she is shown standing next to Eugene in the group photo.

==== Tangled (2028) ====
Teagan Croft has been announced to play Rapunzel in a live-action adaptation of the 2010 film.

=== Merchandise ===
"Rapunzel spends most of her life in a tower with her chameleon friend, Pascal, imagining the world outside. When she meets Flynn Rider, the two of them go on an adventure so she can finally live her dream."
— Blurb extracted from Rapunzel section of official Disney Princess website, summarizing her role in Tangled.

Rapunzel is the tenth member of the Disney Princess line-up, a marketing franchise aimed primarily at young girls that manufactures and releases products such as toys, video and audio recordings, clothing, and video games. The Walt Disney Company introduces characters into its Disney Princess line-up through coronation. Rapunzel's was held on October 2, 2011, at the Kensington Palace in London, England; the character became the franchise's first princess to have been computer-animated. However, the franchise uses a traditionally animated rendering of Rapunzel in most of its merchandise. Following her coronation, Rapunzel was recognized with her own page on the official Disney Princess website.

Disney Consumer Products has released several merchandise based on Tangled that features Rapunzel. The character's likeness has also been adapted into a variety of doll products. Rapunzel was the first character created and released as part of the Disney Animator's Collection, a series of dolls depicting each of the eleven Disney Princesses as toddler. She was designed by Glen Keane, who served as her supervising animator on the original film.

==== Video games ====
Rapunzel appears as a playable character in an interactive adventure-themed video game based on the film, entitled Tangled: The Video Game. The game was released by Disney Interactive Studios on November 23, 2010, one day before the film's November 24 theatrical release, specifically for the Nintendo video game platforms Wii and DS, and follows the plot of the original film. Voice actress Mandy Moore reprises her role as Rapunzel in the video game.

Rapunzel appears in Kingdom Hearts III as a temporary computer-controlled party member. In addition to reprising her role from the film, Rapunzel is identified as one of the New Seven Hearts, the successors to the franchise's original Princesses of Heart, who are targeted by series antagonist Xehanort in his plan to create the χ-blade, a legendary weapon.

An alternate version of Rapunzel appears as a playable character in the video game Disney Mirrorverse.

==== Books ====
Rapunzel appears in Mother Knows Best: A Tale of the Old Witch, the fifth book of the Disney Villains series by author Serena Valentino. She is stolen by Mother Gothel as a baby, but rather than being raised by Gothel, who is obsessed with the preservation of her two sisters, she is raised by Mrs. Tiddlebottom and Mrs. Lovelace, the housekeeper and nanny. On her eight birthday, the Odd Sisters come and assist Gothel in attempting to use Rapunzel's hair to raise her sisters from the dead. When Mrs. Lovelace finds them, the ceremony is broken. Rapunzel is put to sleep and remains asleep in the tower for a decade. When the Odd Sisters' spell breaks, she awakes and events follow the path of the film, with her meeting Flynn and going off on her adventures. When Flynn is stabbed and dies after cutting her hair, Circe uses Rapunzel's tears to resurrect Flynn. The two are later married with Circe and Snow White attending their wedding.

=== Theme parks ===
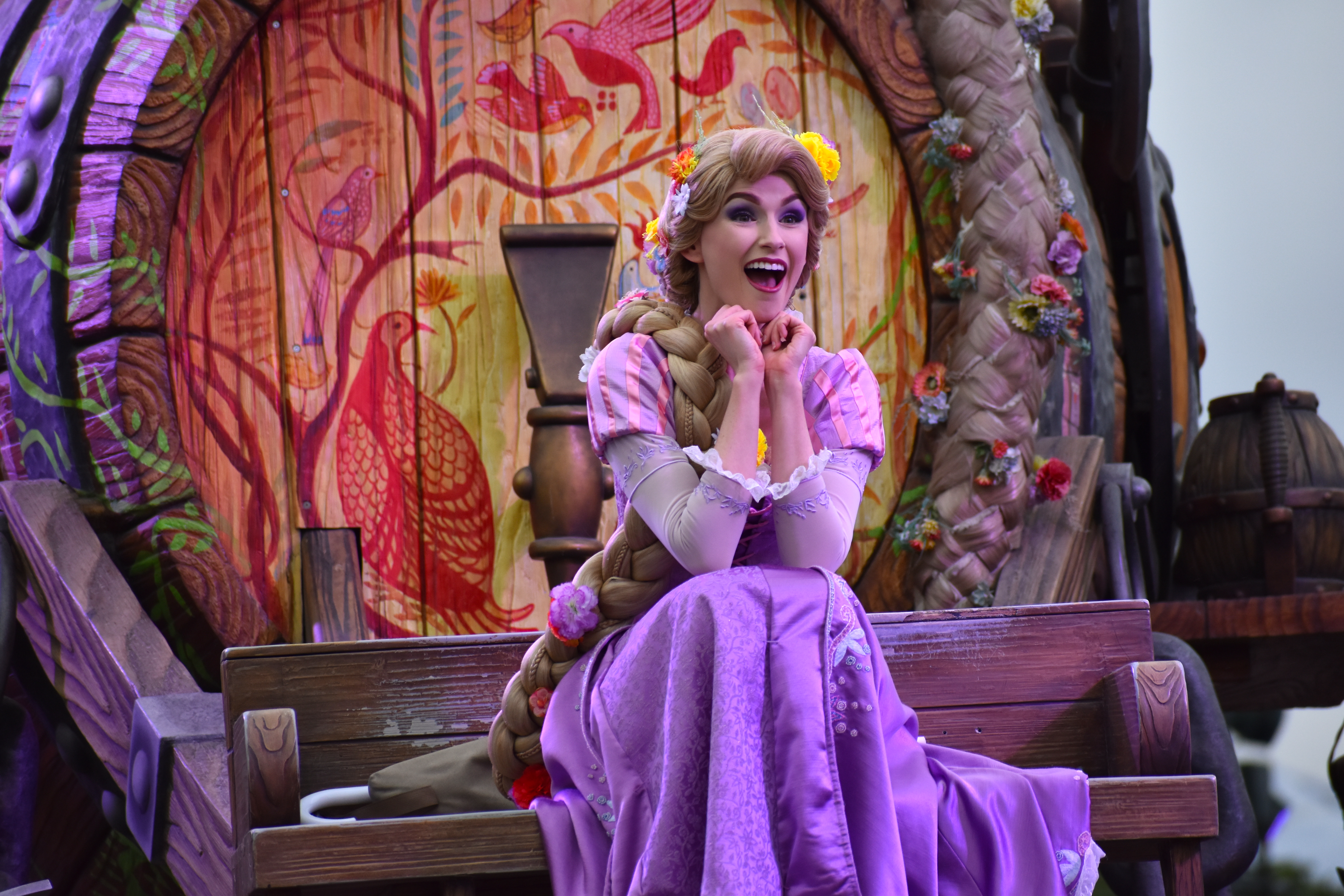
Rapunzel at Shanghai Disneyland in 2019.

Rapunzel currently makes regular appearances at various Walt Disney Parks and Resorts sites, locations and attractions. In anticipation of the film's theatrical release, several Tangled-based attractions were constructed at various Disney Parks locations in both California and Florida, United States. These include a life-sized replica of Rapunzel's tower, located in Fantasyland.

As part of photographer Annie Leibovitz's Disney Dream Portrait Series that she has been commissioning for Walt Disney Parks and Resorts since 2007, The Walt Disney Company hired American country singer-songwriter Taylor Swift to be featured as the model for Rapunzel. In a detailed description of the piece, Us Weekly wrote, "The stunning image — captioned 'Where a world of adventure awaits' — shows the 23-year-old Grammy winner perched on the window ledge of a moss-covered stone tower. A pink petticoat peeks out from under her purple gown as she stares wistfully into the distance, her long golden tresses flowing regally in the wind." Swift told On The Red Carpet that she was honored.

== Reception ==
=== Critical response ===
Critics were generally positive in their opinions of Rapunzel. The St. Paul Pioneer Press' Chris Hewitt described the character as "no damsel in distress", while Sara Vizcarrondo of Boxoffice described the character as "a spunky heroine who could infiltrate the heavily guarded princess canon." Stephen Whitty of The Star-Ledger dubbed Rapunzel "a fairly capable young woman". Bruce Diones of The New Yorker wrote that Rapunzel has "a sharp wit and intelligent concerns", while Claudia Puig of USA Today opined, "Rapunzel is ... believable in her teenage histrionics". Calling the character a "delight", The Austin Chronicle's Marjorie Baumgarten wrote, "Rapunzel is a spunky gal, capable of defending herself". Sandie Angulo Chen of Common Sense Media wrote that Rapunzel is a "guileless, strong, and beautiful" character who is "so breathtakingly good that you can't help but weep with her when she thinks all hope is lost." The Milwaukee Journal Sentinel's Cathy Jakicic described Rapunzel as a "scrappy, self-reliant" heroine who "can rescue herself". The Scotsman commented, "the film doesn't ... turn [Rapunzel] into a simpering damsel in distress." Describing the character as "innocent but (inevitably) feisty", Empire's Helen O'Hara enjoyed the fact that both Rapunzel and Flynn are given "decent character development" while "bas[ing] their growing love story on more than a single longing glance." Similarly, the Mountain Xpress praised Rapunzel and Flynn's relationship, writing, "what works best is the interplay between the two leads ... these animated characters are frankly more believable and charismatic than the human ones in ... Love and Other Drugs (2010)". Todd Hertz of Christianity Today called Rapunzel "fun, dynamic, and wondrous". In 2022, Matthew Stewart and Paul Sheehan of Gold Derby ranked Rapunzel as the third best Disney Princess saying, "Rapunzel's brief yet eventful journey, during which she changes from a naive child into an enlightened young adult, is fascinating to witness. The creatives behind "Tangled" deserve praise for molding a one-dimensional fairy tale character (who, on the page, is outshone by her imposter mother) into a dynamic heroine well worth rooting for."

Jim Schembri of The Age gave the character a very detailed, positive review, writing:

And, of course, the heart of the story is Rapunzel, a freshly minted heroine who morphs from prisoner to strong-willed seeker of her own destiny. Blondes have not had a good rap of late, thanks chiefly to the stream of formulaic rom-coms that have played them up as the ditzes and airheads of cliché. Rapunzel's no-nonsense attitude and proactive air, however, reminds us that the blondes of yore were not to be trifled with. As reimagined in Tangled, Rapunzel defies authority, shuts down male ego and charts her own course. She's not only a great role model for kids, she's the type of gutsy, independently minded, value-added blonde Mae West would have been proud of.

— Jim Schembri, The Age.

The character was not void of criticism. Although Richard Corliss of Time thoroughly enjoyed the film, he felt that too much emphasis was placed on Flynn Rider and not enough on Rapunzel. Corliss questioned the future of Disney's animated heroines, writing, "For 60 years ... girls were the focal characters who could be expected to come of age, triumph over adversity and, in general, man up," and accused various film studios of "abolish[ing] female-centered stories". Variety's Justin Chang described Rapunzel as a "bland, plastic" heroine, likening her to a Barbie doll. Similarly, Tom Huddleston of Time Out described Rapunzel as "bland". James Berardinelli of ReelViews was fairly mixed in his review, writing, "although likeable and energetic, [Rapunzel] is not as memorable as Snow White, Ariel, or Belle". Keith Uhlich of Time Out described the character as "synthetic". He wrote, "you never feel like you're watching a girl on the empowering cusp of adulthood so much as a selection of attitudes compiled through demographic study." The Independent's Anthony Quinn panned the character, describing her as "bland and Valley Girlish". Joe Williams of the St. Louis Post-Dispatch opined, "when the big-eyed heroine tries to tug at our heartstrings and Flynn turns into Prince Charming, the too-familiar hero-and-damsel motif feels like a fashion faux-pas". Similarly, the SouthtownStar's Jake Coyle wrote, "Both Rapunzel and Flynn too much resemble Barbie and Ken, lacking both superficial and emotional individuality." Jen Yamato of Movies.com criticized Disney for "failing to give Rapunzel a backbone and retreading ground so familiar you can fall asleep for ten minutes and still know exactly what happened".

As the tenth Disney Princess, several critics have drawn comparisons between Rapunzel and preceding Disney Princesses and animated heroines, the most frequent and prominent of whom remains Ariel from The Little Mermaid (1989). The Daily News' Joe Neumaier likened Rapunzel's independence to that of Belle from Beauty and the Beast (1991), writing, "thoroughly modern Rapunzel does most of the saving". Jonathan Crocker of Total Film noted similarities between Rapunzel and Ariel, describing Rapunzel as "A strong-willed heroine longing to see outside." Mike Scott of The Times-Picayune commented on Rapunzel's innocence, describing it as "reminiscent of Amy Adams' flighty Giselle from ... Enchanted (2007)". LoveFilm's Tom Charity commented on the character's independence, likening Rapunzel's spirited personality to those of both Ariel from The Little Mermaid (1989) and the title character of Mulan (1998). Charity also labeled Rapunzel "another addition to the more recent Disney tradition of emancipated heroines".

=== Accolades and recognition ===
CNN's Stephanie Goldberg included Rapunzel in her article "Brave (2012)'s Merida and other animated heroines", a list that recognized some of Disney's most heroic and independent heroines who have appeared in animated films. Goldberg jokingly wrote, "So what if ... Rapunzel defends herself with a frying pan and holds prisoners captive with her long, magical hair?" Sonia Saraiya of Nerve ranked Rapunzel fourth in her article "Ranked: Disney Princesses From Least To Most Feminist". Comparing the character's spirited personality to that of preceding Disney Princesses Ariel and Jasmine from Aladdin (1992), Saraiya described Rapunzel as "badass," despite the fact that "her naivete sometimes gets in the way of her progressivism." Saraiya continued, "[Rapunzel] also recognizes the unfairness of her plight and finds a way out of it, outwitting her 'mother,' who is in fact her kidnapper, to venture to the outside world." Tala Dayrit of Female Network included Rapunzel in her article "30 Fierce and Fun Female Cartoon Characters", writing that, unlike her original fairy tale counterpart, "She's not the helpless damsel locked in a tower awaiting an unknown fate, but a strong woman capable of defending herself in a fight."

In the film, Rapunzel performs the song "I See the Light" as a duet with Flynn Rider. The song received an Academy Award nomination for Best Original Song at the 83rd Academy Awards in 2011. Voice actress Mandy Moore performed the song live at the ceremony with co-star Zachary Levi, who provided the voice Flynn in the film. The song did, however, garner the Grammy Award for Best Song Written for Visual Media at the 54th ceremony in 2012.
