= Lego Disney Princess: Villains Unite =

2025 animated television special on Disney+

- Promotional release poster for the special.
- Based on: Lego Disney; Disney Princess
- Developed by: Byron Howard; Mandesa Tindal; Liz Watson; Kyle Zabala; Elise Aliberti; Heather Blodget
- Written by: Rachel Vine
- Directed by: Randi Rodrigues; Jake Wilkinson
- Starring: Jodi Benson; Auli'i Cravalho; Mandy Moore; Anika Noni Rose; Katie Von Till; Julie Nathanson; Jennifer Hale; Kate Higgins; Richard White
- Music by: Steffan Andrews
- Countries of origin: United States; Denmark
- Original language: English

Production
- Executive producers: Jill Wilfert; Keith Malone; Pamela J. Keller; Jennifer Twiner McCarron; Robert Fewkes
- Editors: Jake Wilkinson; Sarah Fricker
- Running time: 23 minutes
- Production companies: The Lego Group; Atomic Cartoons

Original release
- Network: Disney+
- Release: August 25, 2025

Related
- Lego Disney Princess: The Castle Quest; Lego Disney Princess: Magical Mayhem

Lego Disney Princess: Villains Unite is a 2025 animated streaming television special based on both the Lego Disney toyline and Disney Princess franchise. It is a crossover between several characters featured in films produced by Walt Disney Animation Studios, and the second Lego special based on the franchise, preceded by Lego Disney Princess: The Castle Quest.

Lego Disney Princess: Villains Unite focuses on Ariel, Tiana, Rapunzel, Moana and Snow White who face off against Gaston and his villain allies in their attempts to take over their kingdoms once again as well as contending with another villain that Gaston wants to ally with. The special was released on Disney+ on August 25, 2025. It was followed up by Lego Disney Princess: Magical Mayhem on August 21, 2026.

== Plot ==
While on her way to the village marketplace, Snow White is shocked upon the sight of Gaston's return where he now has Sir Hiss as his companion as he explains to him how he survived his encounter with Dragon Maleficent. Gaston has formed a team with Jafar, Ursula, and the Evil Queen to defeat the princesses and reclaim the castle from them following his previous defeat.

Snow White returns to the castle and alerts them of Gaston's plan, to which Ariel, Tiana, Moana, and Rapunzel all decide that they will need extra help in saving the day. Upon being told by Snow White that Evil Queen might have her revenge on him for helping the princesses, the Magic Mirror helps them by summoning Cinderella, Aurora, and Belle to join the team.

The princesses learn that Gaston has also called upon a "bog monster". While first frightened, the princesses are reminded to not give into fear by Snow White. The villains get into a disagreement over who will get the castle when the princesses attack and defeat the villains where Snow White gets over her weariness of apples to defeat the Evil Queen. It is then that the "bog monster" shows up and is revealed to be Chernabog. His presence scares off the other villains except for Gaston and Sir Hiss. Tiana suggests that Gaston team up with them to save the day, but Chernabog ends up turning him into a pig as Gaston constantly fails to get Chernabog to work with him. Realizing that Chernabog only grows more powerful the stronger the night sky is, the eight princesses create a mock sunrise to turn him into a powerless bat that got dubbed "Chernabat".

Recognizing the damages, everyone helps rebuild the village with additional help from the villagers. Sir Hiss tells Gaston that he likes his new look. The princesses find Aurora sleeping with "Chernabat".

== Voice cast ==
- Jodi Benson as Ariel, a mermaid princess from Atlantica.
- Auli'i Cravalho as Moana, a princess from the island of Motonui.
- Mandy Moore as Rapunzel, the princess of the kingdom of Corona.
- Anika Noni Rose as Tiana, the princess of Maldonia.
- Katie Von Till as Snow White, one of the eight princesses.
- Julie Nathanson as Belle, one of the eight princesses. Belle was originally voiced by Paige O'Hara.
- Jennifer Hale as Cinderella, one of the eight princesses.
- Kate Higgins as Aurora, one of the eight princesses.
- Richard White as Gaston, an professional hunter seeking revenge on the princesses for what happened in the last film.
- Jonathan Freeman as Jafar, a sorcerer and former vizier of Agrabah.
- Susanne Blakeslee as the Evil Queen, Snow White's stepmother.
- Debra Wilson as Ursula, a half-woman half-octopus sea witch that was earlier banished from Atlantica. Wilson reprises her role from Disney Speedstorm. Ursula was originally voiced by Pat Carroll.
- Corey Burton as the Magic Mirror, a sentient all-knowing mirror that was originally owned by the Evil Queen.
- Henri Lubatti as Sir Hiss, an anthropomorphic snake and former servant of Prince John. He was originally voiced by Terry-Thomas in Robin Hood.

Additionally, non-speaking appearances of other Disney characters include a Magic Broom and Chernabog from Fantasia, the Evil Queen's raven, Jaq, Gus and Mary from Cinderella, and the forest owl from Sleeping Beauty. Jasmine is mentioned by Jafar where he mentioned that he would have had a witty comment if she was here.

== Production ==
Lego Disney Princess: Villains Unite was announced on July 24, 2025. Animation for the special was done by Atomic Cartoons, replacing Pure Imagination Studios and Zebu Animation Studios from the prior special. The trailer for the special released on August 12, 2025.

== Release ==
Lego Disney Princess: Villains Unite was released on Disney+ on August 25, 2025.

== Reception ==
=== Viewership ===
Lego Disney Princess: Villains Unite ranked No. 1 on Disney+'s daily "Top 10" list a day after its premiere—a ranking based on daily viewership across both films and episodic content—and remained on the chart through August 30, 2025.

=== Critical response ===
Alex Reif of Laughing Place said that Lego Disney Princess: Villains Unite is a lively follow-up to The Castle Quest, bringing friendship, imagination, and Lego magic into another playful adventure. He found that the special expands the world by adding more princesses and villains, with returning voices like Jodi Benson, Anika Noni Rose, Mandy Moore, and Auli’i Cravalho adding authenticity. Reif appreciated the humor of seeing the characters behave in ways different from their original films—like Rapunzel searching for new household items to use as weapons—calling it "all in good fun." He praised the clever cameos, such as the Bog Monster and Sir Hiss from Robin Hood, which give adult Disney fans something extra to enjoy. Reif noted that while the special also showcases new Lego playsets, it ultimately encourages kids to use their creativity, tying in with Disney’s "Create Your World" campaign. Ashley Moulton of Common Sense Media gave Lego Disney Princess: Villains Unite a grade of three out of five stars, noting that while the special includes mild battles with villains and a bog monster, the overall tone remains light and nonthreatening. Moulton appreciated the themes of altruism, teamwork, and courage, observing that the princesses are portrayed as brave, resourceful, and in control of their own destinies, while the villains' selfishness is not rewarded. She also highlighted the special's efforts to modernize classic princesses by giving them more agency and humor, even parodying Gaston's toxic masculinity. However, she pointed out that despite strong gender representation, diversity remains limited, with most princesses portrayed as white and "conventionally attractive."

== Sequel ==
A third Lego Disney Princess special, Magical Mayhem, was released on Disney+ on August 21, 2026 as part of World Princess Week.
