= Kaa =

Fictional animal character

- The Jungle Book character
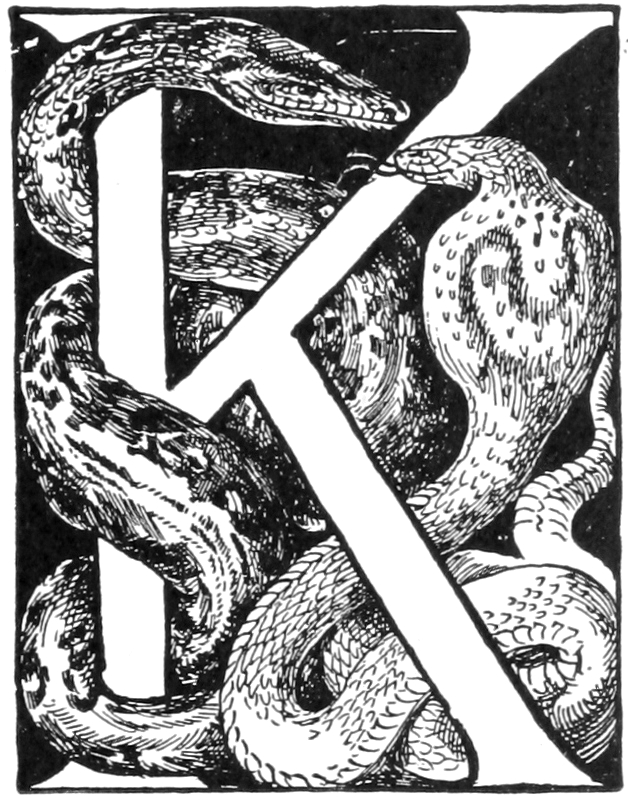
- Kaa (left), as illustrated in the 1895 edition of The Two Jungle Books
- First appearance: "Kaa's Hunting"
- Last appearance: "The Spring Running"
- Created by: Rudyard Kipling

In-universe information
- Species: Indian python
- Gender: Male; Female (The Second Jungle Book: Mowgli & Baloo, 2016 film, and Mowgli: Legend of the Jungle)

Kaa is a fictional character from The Jungle Book stories written by Rudyard Kipling. He is an Indian python who possesses the power of hypnosis. In the books and many of the screen adaptations, Kaa is an ally of protagonist Mowgli, acting as a friend and trusted mentor or father figure alongside Bagheera and Baloo. However, Disney's screen adaptations portray him as a secondary antagonist who attempts to eat Mowgli.

== Kipling's Mowgli stories ==
First introduced in the story "Kaa's Hunting" in The Jungle Book, Kaa is a huge and powerful snake, more than 100 years old and still in his prime. In "Kaa's Hunting", Bagheera and Baloo enlist Kaa's help to rescue Mowgli when the man-cub is kidnapped by Bandar-log (monkeys) and taken to an abandoned human city called the Cold Lairs. Kaa breaks down the wall of the building in which Mowgli is imprisoned and uses his serpentine hypnosis to draw the monkeys toward his waiting jaws. Bagheera and Baloo are also hypnotized, but Mowgli is immune because he is human and breaks the spell on his friends.

Kaa is a symbol of cold-blooded power, both physically and psychologically.

Then Kaa came straight, quickly, and anxious to kill. The fighting strength of a python is in the driving blow of his head, backed by all the strength and weight of his body. If you can imagine a lance, or a battering-ram, or a hammer, weighing nearly half a ton driven by a cool, quiet mind living in the handle of it, you can imagine roughly what Kaa was like when he fought... Generations of monkeys had been scared into good behavior by the stories their elders told them of Kaa, the night-thief, who could slip along the branches as quietly as moss grows, and steal away the strongest monkey that ever lived; of old Kaa, who could make himself look so like a dead branch or a rotten stump that the wisest were deceived till the branch caught them, and then—

The python despises poisonous snakes:

Kaa was not a poison snake--in fact he rather despised the poison snakes as cowards--but his strength lay in his hug, and when he had once lapped his huge coils round anybody there was no more to be said.

In The Second Jungle Book, Kaa appears in the first half of the story "The King's Ankus". After Kaa and Mowgli spend some time relaxing, bathing and wrestling, Kaa persuades Mowgli to visit a treasure chamber guarded by an old cobra beneath the same Cold Lairs. The cobra tries to kill Mowgli but its venom has dried up. Mowgli takes a jeweled item away as a souvenir, not realizing the trouble it will cause them, and Kaa departs.

In "Red Dog", Mowgli asks Kaa for help when his wolf pack is threatened by rampaging dholes (the red dogs of the title). Kaa goes into a trance so that he can search his century-long memory for a stratagem to defeat the dogs:

For a long hour Mowgli lay back among the coils, while Kaa, his head motionless on the ground, thought of all that he had seen and known since the day he came from the egg.

The light seemed to go out of his eyes and leave them like stale opals, and now and again he made little stiff passes with his head, right and left, as though he were hunting in his sleep. Mowgli dozed quietly, for he knew that there is nothing like sleep before hunting, and he was trained to take it at any hour of the day or night. Then he felt Kaa's back grow bigger and broader below him as the huge python puffed himself out, hissing with the noise of a sword drawn from a steel scabbard;

"I have seen all the dead seasons", Kaa said at last, "and the great trees and the old elephants, and the rocks that were bare and sharp-pointed ere the moss grew. Art thou still alive, Manling?"

With Kaa's help Mowgli tricks the dholes into attacking prematurely. Kaa takes no part in the resulting battle (obliquely citing his loyalty to the boy rather than to the wolves, who often caused Mowgli grief) but Mowgli and the wolves finally kill all the dholes, though not without grievous losses.

In "The Spring Running", as the teenage Mowgli reluctantly prepares to leave the jungle for the last time, Kaa tells Mowgli that "it is hard to cast the skin", but Mowgli knows he must cast the skin of his old life in order to grow a new one. Kaa, Baloo and Bagheera sing for Mowgli in "The Outsong", a poem and the ending of "The Spring Running".

== Disney adaptations ==
=== 1967 animated film and sequels ===
Kaa appears in the 1967 animated adaptation by Walt Disney Productions. This version of Kaa is recast as a secondary antagonist and took over as Tabaqui's place, as Walt Disney felt audiences would not sympathize with a snake character. The voice of Kaa is provided by Sterling Holloway.

Kaa notices Mowgli in a tree one night and, rather than a serpentine dance, uses his hypnotic eyes to lull Mowgli into a deep sleep. Kaa nearly eats Mowgli before Bagheera awakens nearby, notices him, and slaps him, awakening Mowgli. Kaa retaliates by hypnotizing Bagheera, though Mowgli pushes Kaa out of the tree, making him unravel violently. Kaa encounters Mowgli again later in the film and once again, hypnotizes him in quick succession, this time using his song, "Trust in Me", to lull him into a deep sleep, though he must hide him when Shere Khan asks him if he's seen the boy. Shere Khan makes Kaa swear to tell him when he finds Mowgli and leaves, though Mowgli eventually wakes up and pushes Kaa out of the tree again.

Kaa is based on earlier characters from Disney films who comically and unsuccessfully attempt to eat the protagonist, including Tick-Tock the crocodile from Peter Pan and the wolf from The Sword in the Stone. Holloway provided Kaa with a hissing lisp while voicing him, which the Sherman Brothers incorporated into Kaa's song "Trust in Me".

Kaa returns in The Jungle Book 2, now voiced by Jim Cummings and has a smaller role. Kaa again tries and fails to eat Mowgli while he and Baloo are singing "The Bare Necessities". After Mowgli inadvertently loses his prickly pear which lands on Kaa's head, he angrily swears that he will "never again associate with mancubs" until he discovers Mowgli's sweetheart Shanti. He hypnotizes her, and tries to eat her. Mowgli's adoptive brother Ranjan thwarts him, causing him to fall down a cliff. Shere Khan finds Kaa again and asks him where Mowgli is, but Kaa lies that Mowgli is heading toward the swamp.

Kaa appears in the prequel series Jungle Cubs, where he is voiced by Jim Cummings. Kaa is seen as a snakeling who is still trying to master his hypnotic abilities, though he is cowardly. He is shown as a protagonist as opposed to the 1967 film, being friendly with the other cubs.

=== 1994 live-action film ===
Kaa appears in the 1994 live-action adaptation. Most of his appearances were created using animatronics and computer-generated imagery, although an unnamed trained anaconda was also used.

Kaa is depicted as a far more menacing predator who lives in Monkey City with King Louie, guarding the orangutan's treasure from intruders. Kaa attacks Mowgli and tries to drown him in a moat, but Mowgli wounds him with a dagger, forcing him to flee in a cloud of blood. Later, Louie summons Kaa again after Mowgli defeats Captain Boone and Boone begins stealing treasure; Kaa scares Boone into the moat, where the stolen treasure weighs him down to the bottom. Struggling to free himself, Boone sees the skeletal remains of Kaa's former victims before being killed by the python.

=== 2016 live-action/CGI hybrid film ===
Kaa appears in the 2016 remake of the 1967 film as a giant female Indian python, voiced by Scarlett Johansson.

As in the 1967 film, Kaa is a villain who desires to hypnotize and eat Mowgli; but like the 2003 sequel, she has a minor role. While she hypnotizes the boy, she reveals that he came to live in the jungle after Shere Khan killed his father and Bagheera found him, then show him the dangerous power of the "red flower" (aka the fire). Soon, the snake wraps her coils around Mowgli and tries to devour him, but Baloo interferes and fights her, therefore rescuing the boy.

Johansson described Kaa in an interview as a "window into Mowgli's past", who uses storytelling to seduce and entrap Mowgli, noting that the way Kaa moves is "very alluring" and "almost coquettish". Johansson also recorded a new version of "Trust in Me" for the film, saying the song was "a strange melody. We wanted it to be a lullaby, but it has a very mysterious sound."

=== Other appearances ===
- A snake-like character resembling Kaa made a cameo during the final scene of Who Framed Roger Rabbit (1988) with the other Disney characters.
- Kaa has several cameo appearances in the television series House of Mouse. He also appears as one of the main villains in the direct-to-video film Mickey's House of Villains.
- In the 2022 short The Simpsons: Welcome to the Club Kaa is one of the Disney villains meeting Lisa Simpson, being voiced by Dawnn Lewis. This was the very first time the character appears in animation ever since The Jungle Book 2. In the end credits he was shown hypnotizing Homer Simpson in his coils.
- In the 2023 short Once Upon a Studio Kaa is shown hypnotizing Clarabelle Cow, and Mickey Mouse tells Kaa to stop it, but Rapunzel knocks Kaa out cold with her frying pan. He is later seen at the end on the roof for the group photo with all the characters.
- In the 2024 short The Simpsons: The Most Wonderful Time of the Year Kaa is among the Disney villains singing the spoof song "It's the Most Wonderful Time of the Year".
- Kaa appears as a playable character in the mobile game Disney Heroes Battle Mode.
- A Lego version of Kaa appears as a minor antagonist in the 2026 special Lego Disney Princess: Magical Mayhem, where he hypnotizes Moana, but she is able to snap out of it and escape.

== Other adaptations ==
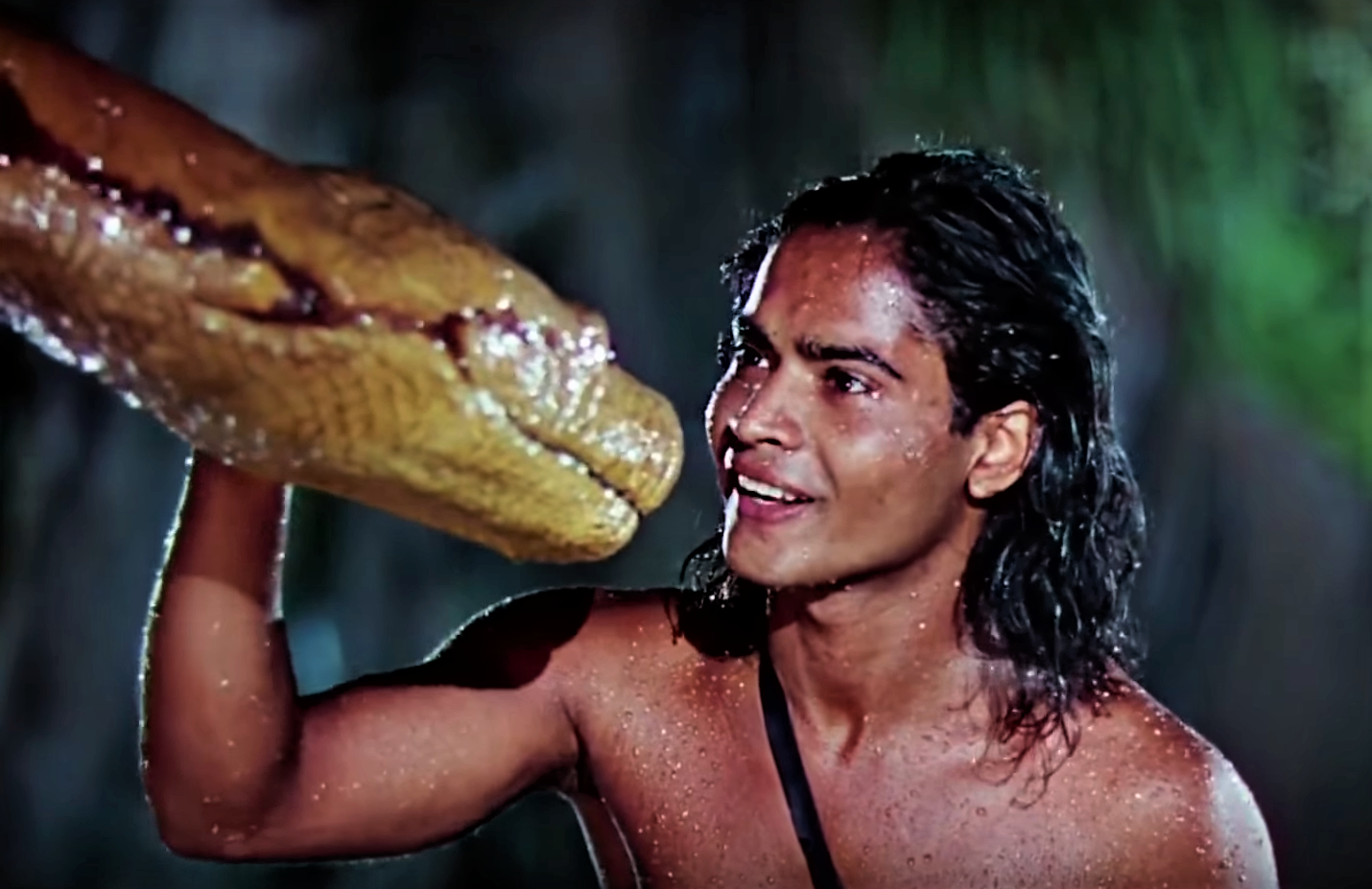
Kaa along with Mowgli in the 1942 film.

- In the 1989 Japanese anime series Jungle Book Shōnen Mowgli, Kaa is voiced by Keaton Yamada in the Japanese and Terrence Scammell in the English dub.
- Kaa appears in the 1942 film adaptation.
- In the 1967 Adventures of Mowgli Soviet cartoons, Kaa was voiced by Vladimir Ushakov in the Russian version, by Sam Elliott in the English dub, and by Adriano Celentano in the Italian dub.
- Kaa also made an appearance in the 1997 live-action film The Second Jungle Book: Mowgli & Baloo. She appears as the snake charmer Karait's pet female python.
- In the 2010 CGI animated television series, Kaa is given a more ferocious personality than in the books, but at the same time he is friends and allies with Mowgli, Bagheera, and Baloo.
- In Mowgli: Legend of the Jungle, Kaa (Cate Blanchett) is a gigantic female Indian python with big, dark green and light yellow scales, and has a calm yet intimidating personality, but has more human facial features and full puffy lips. She is a seer who takes a mentor-like role toward Mowgli and even saving his life at one point in the film.
