= Richard White (actor) =

American actor

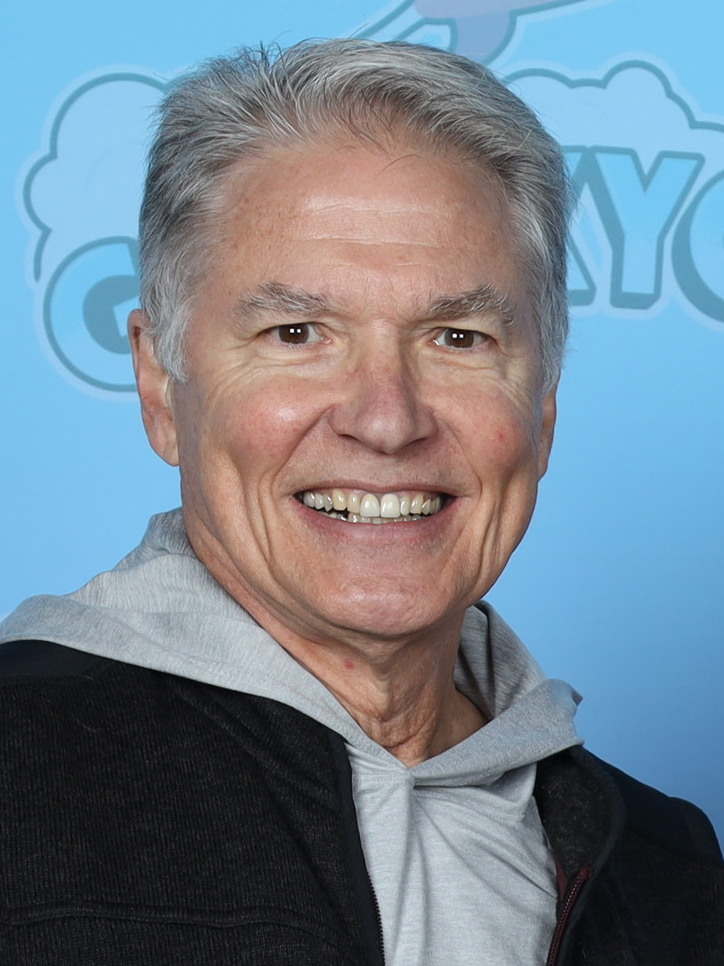
- White at GalaxyCon Richmond in 2023
- Born: 1953 (age 72–73)
- Occupations: Actor, tenor opera singer vocalist
- Years active: 1979–present
- Notable work: Voice of Gaston in Disney's Beauty and the Beast (1991)

Richard White (born 1953) is an American actor and opera singer best known for voicing the character of Gaston in Disney's Beauty and the Beast. He also voiced the character in the early 2000s animated TV series House of Mouse and the 2023 works Lego Disney Princess: The Castle Quest, Disney Speedstorm, Once Upon a Studio, and Disney Dreamlight Valley.

== Career ==
White also played the character of Gaylord Ravenal in Show Boat at Paper Mill Playhouse and Robert Mission in The New Moon, at the New York City Opera. White also created the title role of Erik in the world premiere of Arthur Kopit and Maury Yeston's musical, Phantom and sings the role on the cast recording. White has performed on Broadway as Joey in The Most Happy Fella and has had roles in New York revivals of Brigadoon, South Pacific, and Auntie Mame. He was nominated for a 1985 Joseph Jefferson Award for Actor in a Principal Role in a Musical for Carousel at the Marriott Theatre in Chicago, Illinois. From 2012 to 2013, White starred as Sir Danvers Carew in the national tour and Broadway revival of Jekyll & Hyde.

== Filmography ==
=== Actor ===
Year	Title	Role	Notes
1989	Great Performances	Gaylord Ravenal / Robert Mission / Himself	Episodes: "The New Moon" "Show Boat" "An Evening with Alan Jay Lerner"
1991	Beauty and the Beast	Gaston (voice)	
1992	The 64th Annual Academy Awards	Himself	(TV special)
2001–2003	House of Mouse	Gaston (voice)	Episodes: "Daisy's Debut" "Clarabelle's Big Secret" "The Mouse Who Came to Dinner" "Humphrey in the House" "Halloween with Hades"
2016	King's Quest – Chapter III: Once Upon A Climb	Whisper	video game
2022	Beauty and the Beast: A 30th Celebration	Baker	(TV special)
2023	Lego Disney Princess: The Castle Quest	Gaston (voice)	(TV special)
2023	Disney Speedstorm	Gaston (voice)	video game; credited under "Featuring the Voice Talents Of"
2023	Once Upon a Studio	Gaston (voice)	(Short film)
2023	Disney Dreamlight Valley	Gaston (voice)	video game (via A Rift in Time expansion); credited under "Featuring the Voice Talents Of"
2025	Lego Disney Princess: Villains Unite	Gaston (voice)	(TV special)

== Theatre work ==
=== Broadway ===
- 1979 – The Most Happy Fella – Neighbor
- 2013 – Jekyll and Hyde – Sir Danvers Carew
- 2015 – Gigi

=== Off-Broadway ===
- 1980 – Elizabeth and Essex – Essex
- 1987 – The Desert Song – Pierre Birabeau/The Red Shadow

=== Regional ===
- 1984 – The Desert Song – Pierre Birabeau/The Red Shadow
- 1985 – Show Boat – Gaylord Ravenal
- 1985 – Carousel – Billy Bigelow
- 1987 – Annie Get Your Gun – Frank Butler
- 1989 – Show Boat – Gaylord Ravenal
- 1991 – Phantom – Erik/The Phantom
- 1991 – The Merry Widow – Danilo
- 1992 – Oklahoma! – Curly
- 1993 – Phantom – Erik/The Phantom
- 1994 – Camelot – Lancelot
- 1996 – Gigi – Gaston Lachailles
- 1998 – Dr. Jekyll and Mr. Hyde – Dr. Henry Jekyll
- 2004 – Chasing Nicolette – Count de Valence
- 2013 – A Christmas Carol – Ebenezer Scrooge

== Soundtrack ==
Year	Artist/Writer	Song	Film	Role
1989	Jerome Kern & Oscar Hammerstein II	"Where's the Mate for Me?" "Make Believe" "You Are Love" "Act I Finale" "Why Do I Love You?" "Nun's Processional" "Make Believe" "You Are Love"	Great Performances	Gaylord Ravenal
1991	Howard Ashman & Alan Menken	"Belle" "The Mob Song" "Gaston" "Gaston Reprise"	Beauty and the Beast	Gaston
