= Lego Disney Princess: The Castle Quest =

2023 animated television special on Disney+

- Promotional release poster for the special.
- Based on: Lego; Disney Princess
- Written by: Jenny Lee; Rachel Vine
- Directed by: Michael D. Black
- Starring: Jodi Benson; Auli'i Cravalho; Mandy Moore; Anika Noni Rose; Katie Von Till; Richard White; Jim Cummings; Corey Burton
- Music by: David Wurst; Eric Wurst
- Countries of origin: Denmark; United States
- Original language: English

Production
- Executive producers: Robert Fewkes; Sanjee Gupta; Pamela J. Keller; Joshua Wexler; Jill Wilfert
- Editor: Michael D. Black
- Running time: 47 minutes
- Production companies: The Lego Group; Pure Imagination Studios

Original release
- Network: Disney+
- Release: August 18, 2023

Related
- Lego Disney Princess: Villains Unite; Lego Disney Princess: Magical Mayhem

Lego Disney Princess: The Castle Quest is a 2023 animated streaming television special based on both the Lego Disney toyline and Disney Princess franchise. It is a crossover between several characters featured in films produced by Walt Disney Animation Studios, and the first Lego special based on the franchise. In the special, five princesses have been transported to a mysterious castle and must stop Gaston from taking over their individual kingdoms.

The special was animated by Zebu Animation Studios and released on Disney+ on August 18, 2023. It is the first in a series of Lego Disney Princess specials, followed up by Lego Disney Princess: Villains Unite, released on Disney+ on August 25, 2025.

== Plot ==
Gaston has entrapped King Triton in a fish tank in a castle he is in and tries to possess his trident to make him ruler of land and oceans. Triton proposes a challenge securing him his freedom, to which Gaston asks who would challenge him. The Magic Mirror summons Snow White, Ariel, Tiana, Rapunzel, and Moana, for they are the only ones that could out-best him. Ariel, shocked at the sight of her father demands his release and agrees to partake in Gaston's challenge, and the rest of the princesses follow suit. Gaston breaks the fish tank so that Triton slowly loses water.

The princesses split up. Ariel and Moana set off to find the Magic Carpet while Snow White, Tiana and Rapunzel head to the Dark Forest to find the Sundrop Flower. Gaston brews a storm which is overpowered by Ariel and Moana's connections to the ocean and the two of them come across a pirate ship planning to steal the Magic Carpet. The other three princesses are chased by wolves that they befriend through Snow White's ability to talk to animals, including Flower the Skunk. Ariel and Moana are confronted by the pirate ship's captain, Iago, who attempts to destroy them. His attempt is defeated by Moana, and the two of them get away on the Magic Carpet and return to the castle.

The five reunite and head for the final challenge where they must navigate a maze. The maze feeds off the princesses' anxieties and doubt, and Ariel uses her singing to guide everyone out. Gaston attempts to use the challenge as a way of killing the princesses through Dragon Maleficent, but the princesses notice that her wing is damaged and help restore it. This leads to Dragon Maleficent letting the princesses best Gaston's challenge and she defeats Gaston while the princesses head back.

The princesses return to the castle, devastated by the sight of a dehydrated Triton. Now confident through her new friends, Ariel grabs the trident and the five send him back to the ocean as Triton looks forward for Ariel to visit him. The princesses question the logistics of the castle. The Magic Mirror reveals to them that the castle is also made for them. The princesses move into the castle and each get their own rooms based on their respective identities.

== Cast ==
- Jodi Benson as Ariel, a mermaid princess from Atlantica, and King Triton's youngest daughter.
- Auli'i Cravalho as Moana, a princess from the island of Motonui.
- Mandy Moore as Rapunzel, the princess of the kingdom of Corona.
- Anika Noni Rose as Tiana, the princess of Maldonia.
- Katie Von Till as Snow White. Von Till has voiced the character in all media since 2011, with the exception of Ralph Breaks the Internet (2018) and Once Upon A Studio (2023).
- Richard White as Gaston, the main antagonist of the special. White reprises his role for the first time since Beauty and the Beast (1991) and House of Mouse (2001–03).
- Jim Cummings as King Triton, the king of Atlantica, and Ariel's father. Cummings reprises his role for the first time since The Little Mermaid: Ariel's Beginning (2008), and has voiced the character since the death of his original voice actor, Kenneth Mars.
- Corey Burton as The Magic Mirror, a sentient all-knowing mirror that was originally owned by Snow White's stepmother, the Evil Queen. Burton previously voiced the Magic Mirror in Kingdom Hearts Birth by Sleep following the death of his previous voice actor Tony Jay.
- Barrett Leddy as Iago, he appears as the captain of the pirate ship. This marks the first time someone other than Gilbert Gottfried has voiced the character following his death in 2022. Leddy had previously impersonated Gottfried on The Howard Stern Show in 2014.
- Jeff Bennett as Mr. Smee, a member of Iago's crew.

Additional cast members include Roland Rubio, who voiced Flower from Bambi (1942), and Jo Anne Worley, who reprises her role as the Wardrobe from Beauty and the Beast (1991). Additionally, Gramma Tala (in manta ray form) from Moana, Maleficent (in dragon form) from Sleeping Beauty (1959) and Sebastian from The Little Mermaid appear in non-speaking roles.

== Release ==
Lego Disney Princess: The Castle Quest was revealed on August 2, 2023 as part of a series of month long celebrations of "nearly a century of Disney Princess". A trailer was released on August 8 where it was confirmed that many of the original voices of the characters would reprise their roles.

== Reception ==
Farid-ul-Haq of The Geekiary called the special "an enjoyable little treat for Disney fans", praising some elements such as the easter eggs and the actors' reprisals. Luke Manning of Laughing Place said: "LEGO Disney Princess: The Castle Quest obviously will not live up to any of the movies featured within, but it is a fun diversion for the Princess fan young or young at heart. With trademark LEGO humor and fun animation added, it's a recommended sleepy afternoon viewing".

== Sequels ==
A sequel for this special, Lego Disney Princess: Villains Unite, was released on August 25, 2025 on Disney+. The plot detail the Princesses using the Magic Mirror to summon the aid of Aurora, Belle, and Cinderella when Gaston plans his revenge while allying with Sir Hiss, the Evil Queen, Jafar, and Ursula. In July 2026, a third special, Lego Disney Princess: Magical Mayhem, was announced to release on August 21, 2026 on Disney+.
