= The Mob Song =

1991 song from Beauty and the Beast by multiple artists

Song by Angela Lansbury, David Ogden Stiers, Jerry Orbach, Kimmy Robertson, Paige O'Hara, Rex Everhart, Richard White, and Robby Benson

from the album Beauty and the Beast: Original Motion Picture Soundtrack
- Released: October 29, 1991
- Length: 3:30
- Label: Walt Disney
- Composer: Alan Menken
- Lyricist: Howard Ashman
- Producers: Howard Ashman; Alan Menken

"The Mob Song" is a song from the 1991 Disney animated film Beauty and the Beast.

== Plot ==
"The Mob Song" sees Gaston instill fear into the villagers about the Beast, claiming he will supposedly kill them. Gaston then proceeds to lead the angry mob up to the Beast's castle so that he can kill the Beast while the rest of the villagers rob the castle of its treasures. CommonSenseMedia explains that "misguided townspeople say scary and violent things about the Beast, proposing they kill him and mount his head on a wall."

At one point, Gaston says, "Screw your courage to the sticking place", which is a line from Macbeth.

== Composition and analysis ==
Lyricist Howard Ashman, who had AIDS by the time he wrote the song and viewed the Beast's curse as an allegory for AIDS, was inspired by public sentiment at the time against AIDS and the gay community when writing the song's lyrics. Beauty and the Beast producer Don Hahn further said that the song was written as "almost a metaphor for" the stigmatization against people with AIDS. Tinker Belles and Evil Queens: The Walt Disney Company from the Inside Out claims the song "taps into this demonization of persons with AIDS".

The book Sigmund Romberg says the song is "a cinematic recreation of Nelson Eddy's nocturnal march 'Stouthearted Men' in the 1940 musical film New Moon. The Cambridge Companion of Singing describes the song as a "parody" of the earlier number.

== Critical reception ==
Unlocked described it as a "less time-consuming number". CommonSenseMedia said the song is one of the few things in the film that parents should be concerned about. WCPO said it was "dramatic" with "dark energy".

== 2017 version ==
For the 2017 live-action remake of Beauty and the Beast, Alan Menken adjusted the lyrics to reflect LeFou starting to turn against Gaston. Menken said that he changed the lyrics because director Bill Condon "wanted this sense of Gaston as a demagogue at that point, and the turnaround of Lefou".
