= Snow White (Disney character) =

Snow White and the Seven Dwarfs character

- Snow White and the Seven Dwarfs character
- First appearance: Snow White and the Seven Dwarfs (1937)
- Created by: Hamilton Luske (animator); Marc Davis (animator); Walt Disney
- Based on: Snow White by the Brothers Grimm
- Voiced by: Adriana Caselotti (1937 film); Thelma Boardman (1938 radio); Beatrice Hagen (singing voice, 1938 radio); Jane Powell (1945 radio); Ilene Woods (1949 audiobook); Dorothy Warenskjold (1953 radio); June Foray (1954 record album); Mary Kay Bergman (1989–1999); Carolyn Gardner (2000–2010); Susan Stevens Logan (studio singing voice); Melissa Disney (singing voice, 2000–2010); Katie Von Till (2011–present); Pamela Ribon (Ralph Breaks the Internet); Natalie Babbitt Taylor (Once Upon a Studio)
- Portrayed by: Ann Jillian (The Mouse Factory); Sandy Duncan (Christmas in Disneyland); Mary Jo Salerno (Musical); Stephanie Bennett (Descendants); Rachel Zegler (2025 live-action film)

In-universe information
- Full name: Snow White
- Title: Princess
- Occupation: Scullery maid (former)
- Affiliation: Disney Princesses
- Family: The King (father); The First Queen (mother); Queen Grimhilde (stepmother; deceased)
- Significant other: The Prince
- Nationality: German

Snow White is a fictional character and a main character from Disney Animation's first feature film Snow White and the Seven Dwarfs (1937). Voiced by Adriana Caselotti, the character is derived from the 1812 fairy tale collected by the Brothers Grimm.

Snow White is the first Disney Princess and the first fictional female character with a star on the Hollywood Walk of Fame. Given the title the "Fairest One of All", she has continued to inspire similar traits in future Disney heroines, such as singing and communicating with animals.

After Caselotti, she has also been voiced by Thelma Boardman, Jane Powell, Ilene Woods, Dorothy Warenskjold, June Foray, Mary Kay Bergman, Carolyn Gardner, Melissa Disney, Katie Von Til, and Pamela Ribon, and portrayed live by Mary Jo Salerno (musical) and Stephanie Bennett (Descendants). Rachel Zegler portrays a live-action version of the character in the live-action adaptation of the original 1937 film.

== Appearances ==
=== In Snow White and the Seven Dwarfs ===
Snow White first appears in the film Snow White and the Seven Dwarfs (1937). In "another land, far away," "many, many years ago," about the time of fairy tales of castles, knights, fair maidens, romance, magic and witches," a mysterious and icily beautiful woman with magical powers (a 1938 promotional brochure suggests that she is able to work her witchcraft having sold "herself body and soul to the bad spirits" of Germany's Harz mountains) has gained her royal position by marrying the widowed King, giving her rule over his kingdom before he died. "From that time on the cruel Queen ruled all alone, her every word was law, and all trembled in mortal fear of her anger." The vain Queen owned a magical mirror with which she could look upon whatever she wished. The Magic Mirror shows a haunted, smokey face of her familiar demon which replies to the Queen's requests. She regularly asks the mirror who is the fairest in the realm ("Magic mirror on the wall, who is the fairest one of all?" which is often misquoted as "Mirror mirror on the wall, who is the fairest of them all"), and the mirror would always reply that she is. The Queen has magical power only over her own domain, which is the castle.

In the film, Snow White is initially depicted as living under her wicked, vain stepmother, the Evil Queen, who forces Snow White to work as a scullery maid, fearing that one day Snow White's beauty might become greater than her own. After many years, the Queen's Magic Mirror confirms Snow White as being the "fairest of them all", which causes the Queen to cast Snow White out and send a huntsman to kill her. But when he is unable to bring himself to do so, the huntsman helps Snow White escape into the forest. Snow White stumbles upon the home of the Seven Dwarfs Doc, Sneezy, Grumpy, Happy, Bashful, Sleepy and Dopey, who happily aid her.

The Queen discovers that Snow White has survived, so she uses magic to disguise herself as an old hag and creates a magic poisoned apple that will put anyone who eats it into a “Sleeping Death" from which only the kiss of true love will revive. When the dwarfs are away, the disguised Queen arrives at the dwarfs’ cottage and gives Snow White the cursed apple, stating the apple will grant her a wish if she bites into it. Snow White takes the apple, wishes for a reunion with the Prince, and takes a bite of the apple, which puts her in a deep sleep. Upon discovering what happened, the dwarfs track down the Queen; a short chase ensues, and the Queen is killed. Believing Snow White to be dead, too, the dwarfs build a glass and gold casket in the forest glen, where she sleeps for a year. The Prince comes across Snow White. Saddened by her apparent death, he kisses her, causing her to awaken. As the Seven Dwarfs dance with joy, Snow White and the Prince go off to live together happily ever after.

=== Other appearances ===
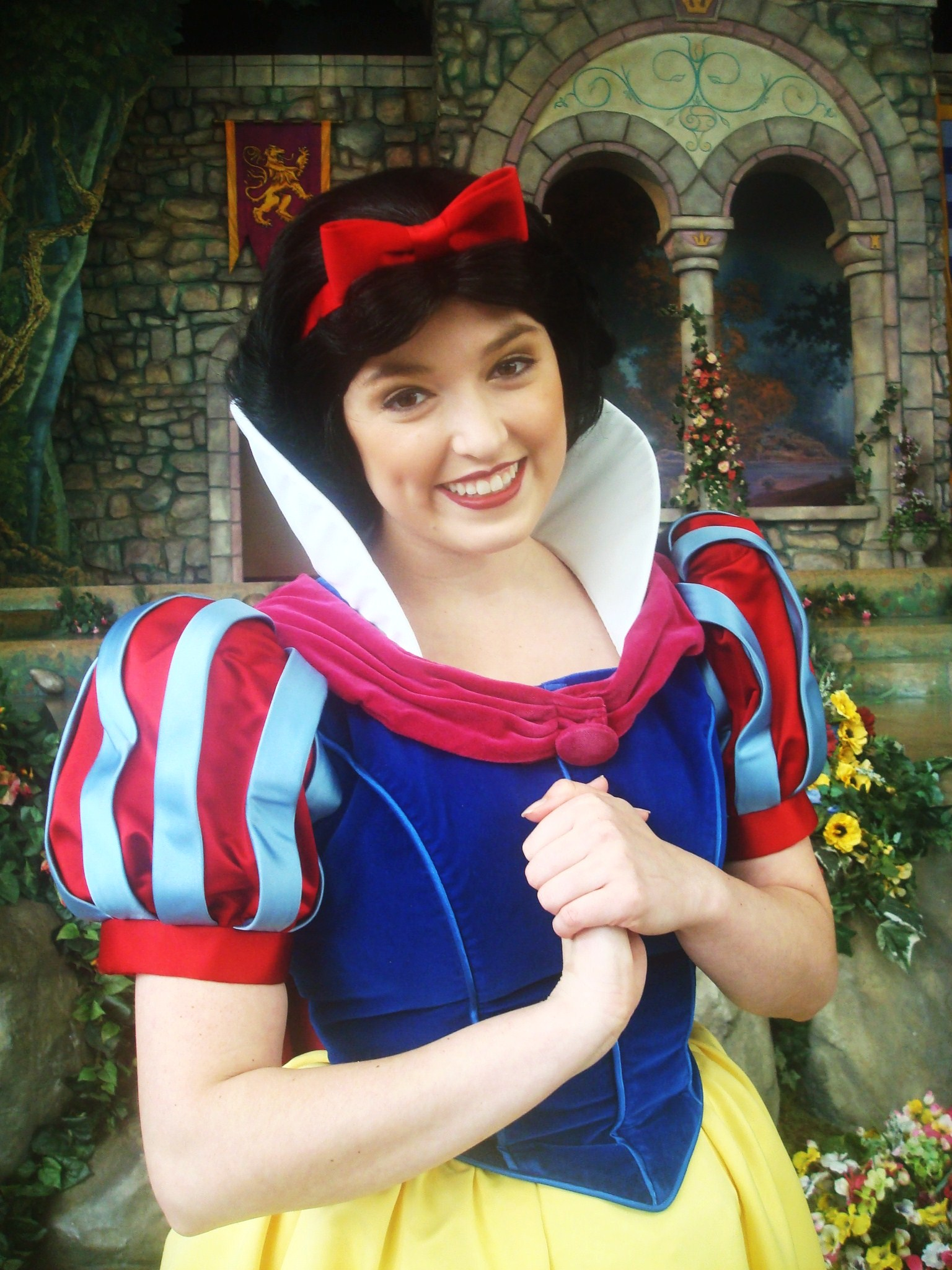
Snow White at Disneyland in 2012

Actress and dancer JoAnn Dean Killingsworth became the first person to portray Snow White at Disneyland in 1955. She was hired to play Snow White for Disneyland's opening on July 17, 1955. Killingsworth's Snow White was the only Disney Princess to have own float during Disneyland's first parade down Main Street, U.S.A. on opening day. Since Killingsworth's 1955 debut as Snow White, more than 100 actresses have played the character at Disneyland.

Snow White's Scary Adventures is a dark ride dedicated to the princess and her story at the Disneyland, Tokyo Disneyland, and Disneyland Paris theme parks. Located in Fantasyland, it is one of the few remaining attractions operational on Disneyland's opening day in 1955. The ride was closed in Disney World in May 2012 as part of the New Fantasyland expansion.

She also makes appearances at Cinderella's Royal Table in Magic Kingdom and at the Akershus Restaurant and Germany Pavilion in Epcot. In California, Snow White can be found at the Princess Royal Hall in Fantasyland at Disneyland Park, on Main Street U.S.A., or by the Wishing Well next to the Sleeping Beauty Castle. She was also one of the meetable characters at Ariel's Grotto in California Adventure until it closed in January 2018. In Disneyland Paris, Snow White can often be at the Princess Pavilion in Fantasyland or at Auberge de Cendrillon in Disneyland Park. In Hong Kong, she is often up by the Wishing Well. In Tokyo, Snow White appears often in Fantasyland or World Bazaar. On Disney Cruise Line, Snow White sometimes appears, depending on a sailing.

Snow White is an official member of the Disney Princess line, a prominent franchise directed at young girls. The franchise covers a wide variety of merchandise, including but not limited to magazines, music albums, toys, clothes, and stationery.

Aside from appearing in video games related to the Disney Princess franchise media as well as appearances on the television series House of Mouse, Snow White also appears in the popular Kingdom Hearts series as one of the Princesses of Heart. She first appears in Kingdom Hearts (2002) as a Princess of Heart captured by Maleficent. She reprises her role from the film in the video game Kingdom Hearts Birth by Sleep. Snow White also appears in the video game Disney Magical World which includes multiple furniture and costume items related to the character, and is also a playable character in Disney Magic Kingdoms.

Mary Jo Salerno originated the role of Snow White in the 1970s musical adaptation. Video recordings were shown on television in the early 1980s.

In a season six episode of the sitcom series Full House known as The House Meets The Mouse Parts 1 & 2, Snow White appeared in Part 2. Snow White also had cameos in the films Who Framed Roger Rabbit (1988) where she appears in the Toontown scene and at the end of the film with the toons and The Lion King 1½ (2004) where she, Seven Dwarfs, and other Disney characters came to rewatch the film with Timon and Pumbaa. In 2014, Snow White made a guest appearance on Sofia the First, in "The Enchanted Feast". She tells Sofia about how her stepmother tricked her by assuming a disguise, helping Sofia to determine that a visiting sorceress is actually an old foe, Miss Nettle. Snow White, alongside other Disney Princesses, appeared in the film Ralph Breaks the Internet. She, along with the other Princesses, are portrayed in what The Washington Post described as a parody of the "Disney Princess Industrial Complex", and are later seen wearing modern outfits inspired by their respective backstories.

In the ABC television series Once Upon a Time, an alternative version of Snow White is the daughter of King Leopold and Queen Eva and later stepdaughter of the Evil Queen (Regina Mills). She is the true love of Prince Charming, mother of Emma Swan and Prince Neal, and grandmother of Emma's son Henry. In Storybrooke, she appears as Mary Margaret Blanchard, Henry Mills' teacher at Storybrooke Elementary School.

In the Disney Channel Original Movie Descendants, Snow White appears as a news reporter who reports activities in Auradon.

Snow White appears as one of the main characters in Lego's animated special Lego Disney Princess: The Castle Quest, released on Disney+ on August 18, 2023. She also appears in the 2025 sequel, Lego Disney Princess: Villains Unite and the 2026 sequel Lego Disney Princess: Magical Mayhem.

Snow White appears in the short film Once Upon a Studio. She sings with Mulan and Asha near the end of "When You Wish Upon a Star" and sits next to the Prince in the group photo.

Rachel Zegler as Snow White in the poster for the 2025 Disney film with Gal Gadot as the Evil Queen.

She is played by Rachel Zegler in Disney's live-action adaptation of the animated film. While the film received mixed reviews, most critics considered Zegler's performance as "one huge highlight" of the film. In this version of the film, unlike most of her fairy tale versions, Snow White is revealed to be named for a snowstorm on the day of her birth by her parents to remind her of her resilience.

=== Books ===
==== The Fairest of All: A Tale of the Wicked Queen ====
Snow White is present in the first book of the Disney Villains series by Serena Valentino. In Fairest of All, Snow White plays a minor role, as the story is more focused on her stepmother. In the story, Snow and the Queen have a very good relationship before the Odd Sisters enchant the Magic Mirror to cause the Queen's jealousy and hatred of Snow. At the end of the novel Snow obtains the mirror and her stepmother becomes the spirit inside.

==== Mistress of All Evil: A Tale of the Dark Fairy ====
Snow White reappears as an older Queen in the fourth book of the Villains series. In the story, she is a queen, is still happily married to her Prince whom she has had children with. She also meets Circe for the first time and helps her uncover secrets about her past. It is revealed as well that Maleficent was assigned Snow White as a charge during her wish granting fairy test, and in order to help Snow White destroyed the mirror that contained Grimhilde's father's wicked spirit to free Grimhilde from her misery and allow her to return to the loving stepmother Snow White knew.

==== Mother Knows Best: A Tale of the Old Witch ====
Queen Snow White appears alongside Circe. She alongside Circe follows Mother Gothel's journey in the storybook kept by the Odd Sisters.

==== The Odd Sisters: A Tale of the Three Witches ====
Snow White features prominently in the sixth book in the Villains series. Alongside Circe, the two of them set out to discover the truth about the Odd Sisters' origins as well as set to rights the trouble and chaos they caused. Along the way they encounter several previous characters in the novels. It isn't until they go to the Dead Woods and encounter Primrose and Hazel that they discover the truth of the Odd Sisters, that they were split into three individual witches by Manea's mother, Nestis, a powerful witch. The babies were taken by Jacob, Manea's former lover and now undead servant, to be given to the White family, where they were raised. A one on one encounter with the Odd Sisters results in the pulling of Grimhilde's spirit from the mirror, where she shatters and dies in front of Snow White. A shaken Snow White then watches as Circe kills herself in front of the Odd Sisters, dying in Snow White's arms despite her pleas.

==== Mirror Mirror: A Twisted Tale ====
In the fifth novel of the series, the question is asked What if the Evil Queen poisoned the Prince? In this retelling, Snow White becomes a warrior princess determined to overthrow her tyrannical stepmother, who poisons Prince Charming to lure her out of hiding.

== Characteristics ==
Snow White is a princess, described by her stepmother's Magic Mirror as having "hair as black as ebony, lips as red as the rose, skin as white as snow." Snow White's clothing is traditionally feminine, and conservative in covering as much skin as possible. Though she is first seen in rags at the film's beginning, Snow White is most well known for her iconic long dress with a white collar, a blue bodice, blue and puffy sleeves with red slashing (paned), an ankle-length yellow skirt with a self-sewn white laced petticoat and a high white collar, along with high-heeled yellow shoes with a bow-like ribbon on each of them, a brown cape with a red interior, and a red bow in her hair.

Snow White is depicted as innocent, kind, and cheerful. Her generous, trusting and helpful nature can cause her trouble, as other people might take advantage of it, such as her stepmother. Although she is sensitive and soft-spoken, she can be energetic, stern, and sarcastic to a degree, such as when she told the Dwarfs to wash their hands or when she scolded the birds for "frightening the poor old lady [the Queen disguised as an old peddler woman]". Snow White is motherly, compassionate, and delights in keeping house for the lovable Seven Dwarfs while she waits to meet her beloved prince again. With her kindness and ethereal beauty, Snow White charms every creature in the kingdom except the Queen. She also shows great resilience and an inner strength against adversity.

=== Description ===
In the original film, Snow White is depicted with black bobbed hair, brown eyes, and skin as white as snow. She wears subtle make-up and rouge. The red color of her lips and cheeks resembles the red color of the poisoned apple that puts her to sleep. She is not yet an adult woman, but a girl in her puberty years. Her plump face is a characteristic typically associated with good health and kindness.

== Development ==
Animators' initial sketches for Snow White's character, some of which bore a resemblance to Betty Boop, did not meet Walt Disney's expectations, as they were too cartoonish. Hamilton Luske, whom Disney had selected as the supervising animator for Snow White's character, was tasked with the challenge of making Snow White more believably human and realistic than any of the Disney studio's previous animated characters. Inspiration for Snow White came from actresses Claudette Colbert and Janet Gaynor. Another possible inspiration came from silent film actress Mary Pickford. Luske's co-animator Les Clark had been asked to develop the character of Persephone for the Silly Symphonies animated short The Goddess of Spring. Of that project, Les Clark later remarked, "I'm sure Walt was thinking ahead to Snow White." Though the Persephone character ended up appearing somewhat lifeless and devoid of personality, that experiment in imitating realistic human movement and anatomy was continued and its lessons were applied in the development of Snow White's animation techniques. Snow White and the Queen were refined by Grim Natwick and Norm Ferguson, who would often override Walt Disney's instructions, as well as Charlie Thorson.

The relatively new technique of using live-action footage as a reference for character movements was used extensively to bring Snow White's character to life. A young dancer named Marge Champion (nicknamed Margie Bell) served as the live-action model for Snow White. (Margie Bell, daughter of animator Ernest Belcher, also later modeled for the Blue Fairy character in Disney's 1940 film Pinocchio.) Hamilton Luske directed her through the filming of numerous movement sequences, and then the animators studied and copied the footage to enhance the realism of Snow White's animated movements. Animator Ollie Johnston later recalled, "Ham's careful planning and shooting of the live-action footage, always with the idea in mind of how it would be used in animation, resulted in a very convincing character."

Originally, Disney could not find what they thought was a suitable voice for Snow White. Around 150 girls auditioned for the role of Snow White, including well-known actresses such as Deanna Durbin, whose voice seemed too old to Disney. One assistant to Disney called music teacher Guido Caselotti, complaining that Hollywood had no singing girls. Caselotti wanted to offer to send their best to listen to the students, but it turned out that his 20-year-old daughter Adriana Caselotti overheard a conversation on another phone in the house, and she began to sing in a young girl's voice. Her father was confused and told his daughter to get away from the phone, but the casting director liked her voice and invited her to audition. After Walt Disney heard her, he immediately gave her the role. The studio signed a multi-page contract with Adriana Caselotti: she was forbidden to sing in a film or on the radio before or after the film premiered because Walt Disney did not want the voice of Snow White to be heard anywhere else. Instead, she received $970 (now worth approximately $21,724).

=== Setting ===
While the film never states the location of its story, "the dwarfs’ home is decorated with carved wooden furniture and instruments". This home is surrounded by mountains and an extensive forest. These details suggest a location within the Black Forest of Germany, where there is a tradition of wood carving.

BuzzFeed views Snow White as a German woman, and suggests that a "historically accurate" Snow White would have been raised within the "austere and religious" culture of the Holy Roman Empire in the 16th century.

== Reception ==
=== Critical reception ===
Critical reception towards the character of Snow White has been polarized. TV Guide described Snow White as iconic, unique and incomparable, writing, "never again would Walt's heroine have such a fantasy singing voice, and for that reason, she's the favorite heroine of many animation auteurs." Calling Snow White a "fairy-tale princess," Otis Ferguson of The New Republic simply described the character as "just what you would have her." Variety's John C. Flinn deemed Snow White "the embodiment of girlish sweetness and kindness, exemplified in her love for the birds and the small animals of the woods that are her friends and, as it subsequently develops, her rescuers."

Contemporary critics felt that Snow White "lack[s] nerve, unlike many later Disney heroines," while her relationship with the Prince is void of chemistry. Roger Ebert of the Chicago Sun-Times felt that had "Snow White and the Seven Dwarfs ... been primarily about Snow White, it might have been forgotten soon after its 1937 premiere, and treasured today only for historical reasons." Ebert continued, "Snow White is, truth to tell, a bit of a bore, not a character who acts but one whose mere existence inspires others to act," describing Disney's tendency to "confuse the titles of his movies with their subjects" as a "mistake" as the film is more about the dwarfs and the Evil Queen than Snow White. The Washington Post's Desson Howe wrote, "the spirit in the mirror is dead wrong: The Wicked Queen ... is the fairest in the land" while Snow White lacks "real estate." Time Out opined, "Snow White herself might be felt to be almost unbearably winsome."

=== Awards ===
Snow White's big role is in Snow White and the Seven Dwarfs where she plays a young princess who tries and escape her evil stepmother. The character won many awards for her role like the Grand Biennale Art Trophy from the Venice Film Festival, the New York Film Critics Circle, and the Academy of Motion Pictures Arts and Sciences. There was also an honorary custom-made Academy Award with the standard Oscar statuette and seven small statuettes that represented the seven dwarfs. Snow White is one of the few fictional characters with a star on the Hollywood Walk of Fame.

=== Trademark ===
On June 18, 2013, the United States Patent and Trademark Office granted the trademark application of Disney Enterprises, Inc. (filed November 19, 2008), for the name "Snow White" that covers all live and recorded film, television, radio, stage, computer, Internet, news, and photographic entertainment uses, except literature works of fiction and nonfiction.

== Cultural impact and significance ==
Snow White was the first Disney Princess and her character provided the basis for later heroines in Disney fairy tales to come. Widely referred as the “fairest one of all”, Film Magazine hailed Snow White as the Best Disney Princess ever, saying: “Snow White is the pioneer of the Disney Princess, and she is probably the most memorable. She embodies everything you think of when you think of a princess, pure innocence, beauty, kindness and grace.” San Antonio Express-News listed her as one of the most famous fictional princesses of all time. MTV ranked Snow White as the 3rd Best Disney Princess of all time. Teen Vogue also included her on their list of Top 10 Best Disney Princesses of All Time, saying: “Snow White showed us that you can make friends in unlikely places and that you should never let go of your optimism.”

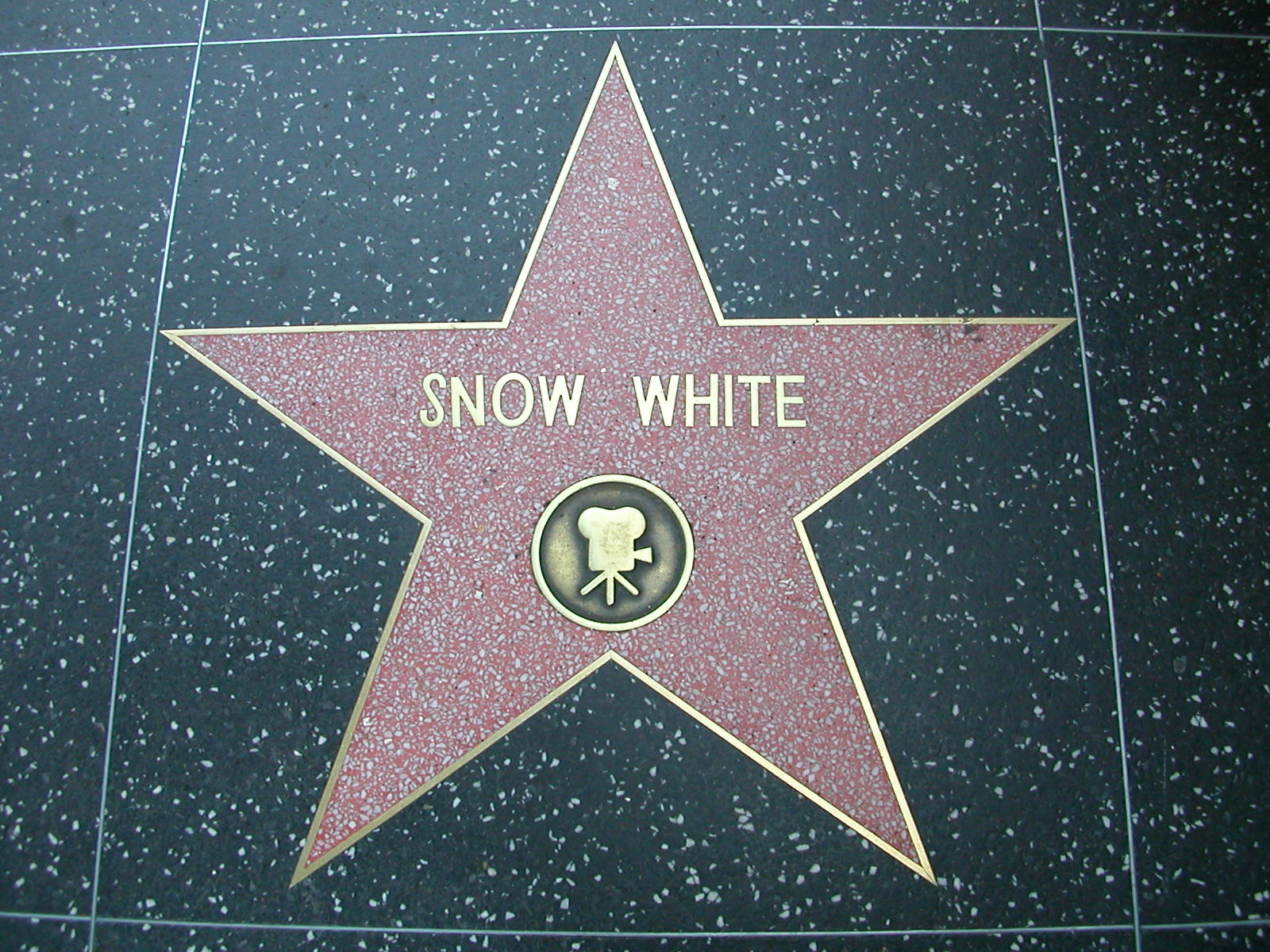
Snow White's star on Hollywood Walk of Fame

In 1987, Snow White became the first female fictional character to receive a star on Hollywood Walk of Fame. She was voted as the Most popular Disney Princess in Nevada, and was also voted as Great Britain's most loved Princess in 2018. Time Magazine ranked her as the 3rd Most Popular Disney Princess (in terms of the amount they've earned on eBay since May 2013). Furthermore, Snow White is also the most successful Disney Princess in terms of office revenue.

=== Fashion ===
Art historian Carmenita Higginbotham explains how Walt Disney's Snow White became a reflection of American women during the Great Depression saying: “Snow White is the perfect embodiment of 1930s culture.” National News also discussed how cartoon characters like Snow White influenced fashion. A Cartier charm bracelet, originally created in 1937 to commemorate Disney's first animated film, earned more than five times the high-end of its pre-sale estimate.

In 2014, Valentino released an entire Snow White-inspired collection “Red Valentino”, a diffusion line aimed to attract youth culture. In 2018, Coach released their third collaboration with Disney called “A Dark Fairytale Collection”, which features iconography from both "Sleeping Beauty" and "Snow White and the Seven Dwarfs." Stylist included Snow White's dark bob and pale skin as an “ideal” on their list of Best Beauty Looks in Disney. Sennet Frères released a bridalwear collection in collaboration with Disney, inspired by Snow White, Cinderella and Belle.
