= Commodity feminism =

Feminist concept

Commodity feminism theorizes that the mass media appropriates feminism for commercial purposes, using it as a vehicle to sell consumer products and services. By associating brands with key concepts surrounding feminism, such as the idea that women are empowered and strong, marketers and advertisers use feminism in ways that are internally contradictory and appropriative. It is a phenomenon that has fueled contemporary debates on corporations and whether their use of commodity feminism helps or hinders feminism in the long term.

The term "commodity feminism" was developed and articulated by Goldman, Heath, and Smith in a 1991 essay in Critical Studies in Mass Communication. This essay notes that femininity and feminism have been in opposition, with feminism critical of the ways in which femininity is used to marginalize and oppress women. The authors argue, in part, that in the marketplace, "Femininity and feminism become presented as interchangeable alternatives" through the "logic of market segments and product differentiation," transforming "feminism into a manipulable set of semiotic markers -- confidence and attitude -- which bear the meanings of individual freedom and independence associated with feminism. Terms like 'attitude' and 'confidence' [...] represent what can be acquired through the right consumer choices" (p. 348).

This “commodity feminism” reflects a transition in overall advertising. The Fourth Wave of Feminism has increased the amount of pro-women advertisements. This shift began with the increasing independence of women in the financial sphere in the 1970s, leading to more open critiques of advertising depicting women as sex objects. Especially in recent years, corporations have begun to lean into commodity feminism to appeal to a wider audience.

== Influence on feminist scholarship ==
Since the article's publication in 1991, commodity feminism has become a major concept that is broadly applied in feminist media studies, cited frequently by other scholars, many of whom apply it in their analysis of media and popular culture. For example, it has informed critical analyses of topics including telenovelas, girl power, children's media, TV shows such as Sex and the City, and pop stars such as Beyoncé. It has also informed the rise of new, related terms like "femvertising."

Commodity feminism, due to its connections to global consumer culture, has also been connected to concepts of ethical capitalism and neoliberal influences in relation to themes of feminism.

The term "commodity feminism" brings to mind the term "commodity fetishism" and added a new dimension to it, as Kirsten Howard has noted.

== Examples ==
The Spice Girls, the Virginia Slims' "You've Come A Long Way, Baby" campaign, The Dove Campaign for Real Beauty, the Fearless Girl statue, the Always #LikeAGirl campaign, THINX's “We Bleed for Female Empowerment," and women requiring deodorant “Strong Enough For A Man” put on Secret. are among the many products and advertising campaigns have been cited as examples as commodity feminism.

The Dove Campaign for “Real Beauty” is notable; it was started at the G(irls) 20 Summit, and in many ways popularized the use of commodity feminism by bringing together their consumers and social change. This widespread campaign has allowed many scholars the opportunity to study the closer relationship between corporations and social change in recent years.

Another notable example, the “Always #LikeAGirl" video by Procter & Gamble, had praise and critiques, providing another widespread example of commodity feminism for scholars. They won awards for their challenge of the phrase “like a girl” being used as an insult, and their subsequent positive reframing of it. However, there were also critiques, questioning the authenticity behind the video's message, especially within a capitalist context.

In the field of media, more subtle examples of commodity feminism appear through the financial power of companies over female youth and the impacts, both positive and negative. Movies such as those made by Pixar or Disney impact gender perceptions of young people. In an age of Fourth Wave Feminism, companies like Disney have responded by adapting their products to exhibit “soft feminism” to meet consumer demands and sell more products promoting characters or movies that encourage female empowerment. This can be positive and negative, depending on the gender norms being exhibited in the films.

Today, commodity feminism is particularly pervasive in representations of femininity in popular culture. Such things in advertising present the viewer with “narrow stifling stereotypes” which may come across as empowering females or degrading while working against the feminist movement. “Young women of the world, two things are lacking in your life: gender equality and shiny hair. And we can help you achieve at least one of those things.”. A quote from a Pantene ad also using class commodity feminism to claim to fix gender inequality with a product; shampoo.

== Critiques ==
"Much contemporary advertising, including the examples mentioned above, engages in obfuscation of the labour and product-ness of the commodity being presented. Value is instead assigned or implied by linking the commodity to a particular lifestyle, identity or social cause. Commodity feminism is one example of the addition of an ideological layer that distracts from the origins and nature of the commodity advertised."

The term pays homage to Marx's notion of “commodity fetishism” and is often framed within contemporary Marxist and feminist terms. The definition of commodity feminism and commodity fetishism go hand in hand. Commodity fetishism is the relation of production and exchange of social relationships involving money and merchandise. The use of fetishism towards females has been occurring for decades, but within the use of ads in the consumerism increase, this commodity fetishism has created commodity feminism. Consumerism has taken over enough for feminism to be used and become a commodity that is profitable. This profit off feminism has consumers in debate about how far it can go as well as if it is morally correct to be exploiting a fight that has been fought by women for decades. These advertisement that are making feminism a commodity have done things like promote “real beauty” and to tackle body image disorders among young women. Some of these campaigns can not only portray the opposite of what they claim to be feminism but can have real side effects on the credibility of feminism. These are the doubts raised by critics of movements such as the Dove Beauty Campaign and the Always #LikeAGirl campaign; their feminist messages placed in the context of consumerism could raise doubts about the sincerity of those messages.

"Also valid is the comment that the “you be you” message of these ads is at odds with the very nature of marketing, which emphasizes a lack or imperfection in order to then provide a product with which to solve this “problem”." As said by Kristen Howard, the nature of marketing; fixing a problem, being involved with feminism can be contradictory as the "you be you" message as companies try to convince us that buying their product will support the feminine cause. Dara Persis Murray makes a similar statement regarding the contradiction within the Dove Campaign for Real Beauty (CFRB), emphasizing that "real beauty," while it has a message within its branding of positive viewpoints on beauty, also has an inherent nature of dominant standards of beauty. It both rejects standards and utilizes them for their product.

== See also ==
- Astroturfing
- Brigitte Vasallo
- Ethnocentrism
- Feminationalism
- Femvertising
- Greenwashing
- Homonationalism
- Intersectionality
- Islamic feminism
- Pinkwashing
- Redwashing
- Postcolonialism
- Whitewashing
