= Gendered Islamophobia =

Gender-differentiated discrimination against Muslims

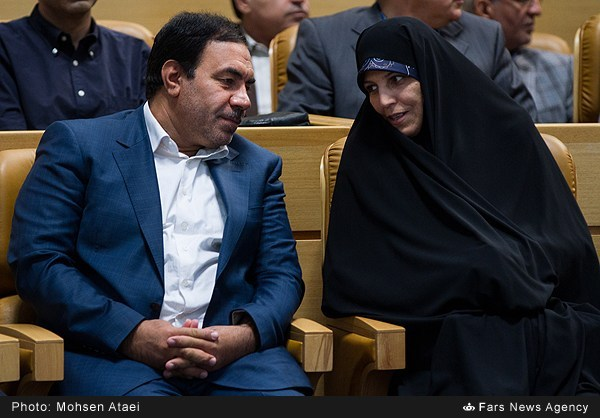
The fact that Islamic tradition imposes dress codes on women, but not on men, or that it permits polygyny but not polyandry, reflects the structural sexism of Muslim societies, reinforcing gender stereotypes.

Gendered Islamophobia is a specific form of Islamophobia that manifests through stereotypes, prejudice, and discrimination directed differently toward Muslim men and women.

In this form of sexism, Muslim women are often perceived as inherently oppressed, backward, or incompatible with values such as gender equality. This representation serves both to justify their exclusion by certain ideological groups and to argue for the need to liberate them by others.

Muslim men, meanwhile, are often stereotyped as sexist or violent, while their loyalty and sense of belonging to the nation in which they reside are called into question, and they may even be associated with extremist or terrorist values. These prejudices portray them as potential aggressors not only toward Muslim women, but toward all women and Western society as a whole, potentially serving to justify the expulsion of migrants.

== See also ==
- Gender roles in Islam
- Islamic feminism
- Islamic veil
- Muslim feminist views on hijab
- Hijabophobia
- Femonationalism
- Purplewashing
- Women in Islam
