= Belle (Disney character) =

- Beauty and the Beast character
- Belle wearing her ball gown
- First appearance: Beauty and the Beast (1991)
- Created by: Linda Woolverton
- Based on: Beauty by Gabrielle-Suzanne Barbot de Villeneuve
- Designed by: James Baxter (supervising animator); Mark Henn (supervising animator)
- Voiced by: Paige O'Hara (1991-present); Julie Nathanson (2011 - In tandem with O'Hara)
- Portrayed by: Susan Egan (1994 musical); Lynsey McLeod (1995–1997 TV series), and (1999 film); Keegan Connor Tracy (Descendants); Emma Watson (2017 film); H.E.R. (Beauty and the Beast: A 30th Celebration)

In-universe information
- Affiliation: Disney Princesses
- Family: Maurice (father)
- Significant other: Beast/Prince (Note: Some later documents revealed his real name was Adam.)
- Children: Ben (Descendants)
- Nationality: French

Belle is a fictional character in Disney's Beauty and the Beast franchise. First appearing in the 1991 animated film, Belle is the book-loving daughter of an inventor who yearns for adventure and respite from her mundane village. When her father is imprisoned by a cold-hearted beast, Belle offers her own freedom in exchange for his. Despite his outward appearance, she gradually befriends the Beast, who learns kindness in return.

The character was created by screenwriter Linda Woolverton, who Disney had hired to adapt the "Beauty and the Beast" fairy tale into an animated musical about a strong heroine. Influenced by the women's movement, Woolverton committed to writing Belle as a proactive and intelligent character to distinguish her from previous Disney heroines, particularly Ariel from The Little Mermaid (1989). Belle's supervising animators, James Baxter and Mark Henn, drew inspiration from various sources to design a beautiful yet believable heroine, specifically referencing European facial features, ballerinas, and several classical Hollywood actresses. 500 actresses auditioned for the role before Paige O'Hara was cast due to her Broadway experience and mature-sounding voice.

Belle has received mostly positive reviews from film critics, who praised her bravery, intelligence, and independence. Although she was initially celebrated as a feminist character, reassessments have been more divided, with some critics arguing that her story romanticizes captivity and traditional romantic ideals. The fifth Disney Princess, Belle is often ranked among the franchise's best characters and is credited with influencing a generation of smart, empowered animated heroines. One of Disney's most recognizable characters, she was also the only animated heroine nominated for the American Film Institute's list of greatest film heroes.

Susan Egan was nominated for a Tony Award for Best Actress in a Musical for originating the role of Belle in Broadway adaptation of the film, and Emma Watson played her in its 2017 live-action remake. In addition to the film's several sequels, spin-offs, and merchandise, iterations of the character have appeared in various media outside the Beauty and the Beast franchise.

== Role ==
Belle debuts in Beauty and the Beast (1991) as a bright, independent young woman, who longs for adventure beyond her "provincial" town. Although admired for her beauty, she is considered odd by the villagers due to her love of books. She is relentlessly pursued by the arrogant hunter Gaston, whose advances she rejects. When her father goes missing, Belle finds him imprisoned by a beast in a mysterious castle inhabited by enchanted objects and offers herself in exchange for his freedom. Belle gradually forms a bond with her host after he rescues her from a wolf attack and she tends to his injuries. As their relationship deepens, the Beast allows Belle to return home after she discovers her father has fallen ill. When Gaston leads an attack on the castle, Belle returns in time to confess her love to the mortally wounded Beast before he dies, breaking the spell and restoring his human form.

In Beauty and the Beast: The Enchanted Christmas (1997), Belle attempts to reignite the castle's waning spirit by reintroducing and celebrating Christmas, in spite of the Beast's strong resentment towards the holiday. Meanwhile, a solemn pipe organ named Forte grows determined to sabotage Belle and the Beast's burgeoning friendship because he longs to maintain his co-dependent relationship with his master. Tricked by Forte into retrieving a large Christmas tree from a frozen pond, Belle nearly drowns, only to be rescued by the Beast. The Beast, however, having been misinformed by Forte, wrongly accuses Belle of trying to escape again, and locks her in the dungeon as punishment. When the Beast finally discovers the truth, they forgive each other, and Belle helps him thwart Forte's plan to destroy the castle. Belle's Magical World (1998), depicts Belle as she interacts with both the Beast and his enchanted servants in various segments, exploring themes such as forgiveness, friendship, cooperation and respect.

In Belle's Tales of Friendship (1999), a spin-off of the film series, Belle owns a bookshop in which she teaches valuable lessons to children by reading and retelling well-known stories and fairy tales, narrating four Disney animated shorts: The Three Little Pigs (1933), Peter and the Wolf (1946), The Wise Little Hen (1934), and Morris the Midget Moose (1950). For the first time, Belle appears as both animated and live-action versions of herself, voiced and portrayed by actresses Paige O'Hara and Lynsey McLeod, respectively.

== Development ==
=== Creation and writing ===
After the success of Disney's first feature-length animated film, Snow White and the Seven Dwarfs (1937), Walt Disney himself had attempted to adapt the "Beauty and the Beast" fairy tale several times. The project was shelved due to challenges encountered translating the fairy tale's static main characters and plot to film, and Walt Disney was particularly wary about animating Belle's imprisonment. Inspired by the success of 1989's The Little Mermaid, Disney chairman Jeffrey Katzenberg greenlit another attempt at adapting the story under director Richard Purdum. However, Katzenberg was dissatisfied with Purdum's dark, somber interpretation, and ordered that the film be completely reworked into a musical starring a strong heroine, similar to The Little Mermaid. Largely fueled by some critics' condemnation of Ariel's characterization in The Little Mermaid, Disney encouraged a "feminist twist" on the "Beauty and the Beast" story. After hearing some of her ideas about Belle in a story meeting, Katzenberg hired screenwriter Linda Woolverton to write the film's screenplay.

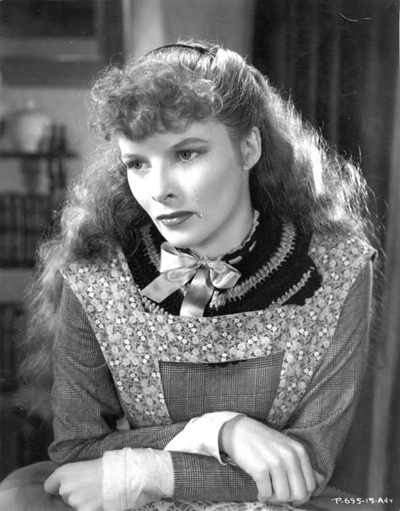
Screenwriter Linda Woolverton based Belle on actress Katherine Hepburn's performance in Little Women (1933).

Woolverton is credited with creating the character. She felt Disney had typically portrayed their female leads as victims, with Belle's lack of agency in early drafts of Beauty and the Beast proving contentious among the film's writers. While the studio still wanted Beauty and the Beast to evoke their classic films, the writers by contrast envisioned Belle as "a woman that was ahead of her time". As the first woman to write a feature-length animated film for Disney, Woolverton decided to use Belle as an opportunity to create a female character who would ultimately be better received than Disney's previous princesses, specifically Ariel. Aware of the daunting responsibility due to the mermaid's popularity, Woolverton fought relentlessly to create "a new kind of Disney heroine". Inspired by the women's rights movement, the screenwriter conceived Belle as a brave yet book smart feminist to avoid creating an "insipid" princess. She believed contemporary audiences would not relate to Belle unless she was updated to reflect modern times, but incorporated fairy tale elements so she would still seem plausible in her environment. Refusing to watch Jean Cocteau's 1946 film adaptation of the fairy tale, Woolverton instead based Belle on actress Katharine Hepburn's portrayal of Jo March in the 1933 film adaptation of Louisa May Alcott's novel Little Women.

The story team for Beauty and the Beast was predominantly male. Woolverton frequently debated Belle's characterization with some of the more traditional-minded story artists, although she was supported by Katzenberg and lyricist Howard Ashman, who advocated for Belle to be "a thinker and a reader" rather than a passive character. She recalled that much of her work on Belle was met with pushback, including an instance where a scene depicting Belle choosing travel destinations on a map was replaced with her baking a cake. Arguing that baking did not align with Belle's independent nature, Woolverton proposed having her read a book instead, although some felt this was too passive an activity. As a compromise, Belle was ultimately depicted walking while reading, a behavior inspired by Woolverton's own childhood habit. Despite numerous revisions that she found at odds with her original vision, her overall concept for Belle remained largely intact. Woolverton acknowledged that her firm stance on Belle's characterization was not always well received by the writing staff, but she remained committed to shaping the character as she had envisioned.

In adapting the fairy tale, Woolverton omitted Belle's two selfish sisters and their love interests to prioritize her dynamic with Gaston. She also removed the subplot in which Belle asks her father for a rose. Characters from Purdum's treatment, including Belle's younger sister, Clarice, and her strict aunt, Marguerite, were discarded; Clarice's removal emphasized Belle's loneliness, while Marguerite was replaced by Gaston as the film's primary antagonist. Visual development artist Sue Nichols suggested that Belle needed a female confidante in the castle to help her feel safe and develop a bond with the Beast, leading to the creation of Mrs. Potts. In Jeanne-Marie Leprince de Beaumont's version of the fairy tale, Belle is forced to take her father's place as the Beast's prisoner. To emphasize Belle's independence, Woolverton rewrote the character to willingly search for her father at the castle, where she confronts the Beast and offers to take Maurice's place. Woolverton explained that she wanted to establish Belle's willingness to make sacrifices early in the film so the audience would find her decision believable. To add realism, Woolverton included small imperfections in Belle's design, such as a stray lock of hair that frequently falls into her face, which was one of the few details she specified about the character's appearance. During Gaston's climactic fight with the Beast, his original line, "Time to die!", was changed to "Belle is mine!" to keep the story's focus on Belle.

=== Voice ===
Disney auditioned approximately 500 actresses for the role of Belle. They originally considered rehiring Ariel's voice actress, Jodi Benson, but decided she sounded too young and American for the character they created, who they wanted to sound more like an adult woman than a girl. Actress Paige O'Hara was performing on Broadway when she first read about Disney's then-upcoming animated film Beauty and the Beast in The New York Times, and immediately booked an audition once she learned the studio was specifically recruiting Broadway talent for its female lead. Familiar with O'Hara's work in the Broadway musical Show Boat, Ashman had already been considering her for the part. O'Hara auditioned five times over the span of two weeks, first solely for casting director Albert Taveres. She also mailed recordings of herself singing "Heaven Help My Heart" from the musical Chess to Disney. At her first in-person audition, O'Hara originally spoke and sang in a higher register but the filmmaker's preferred her natural voice. In addition to Katzenberg and Ashman, O'Hara's last few auditions were attended by directors Kirk Wise and Gary Trousdale, producer Don Hahn, and composer Alan Menken. They initially listened with their eyes closed to avoid being influenced by her physical appearance. Wise said they were drawn to a unique hitch in O'Hara's voice that helped convince them she was equally capable delivering comedy and drama, with certain qualities that reminded them of actress Judy Garland. An hour after her final audition, Disney telephoned O'Hara on her birthday to inform her she had been cast. The actress was fairly confident she had been cast before it was official, for which she credits Ashman. The lyricist would later reveal to Benson that the final choice was between her and O'Hara, and explained that they ultimately chose the latter because they felt the princesses should be represented by different actors.

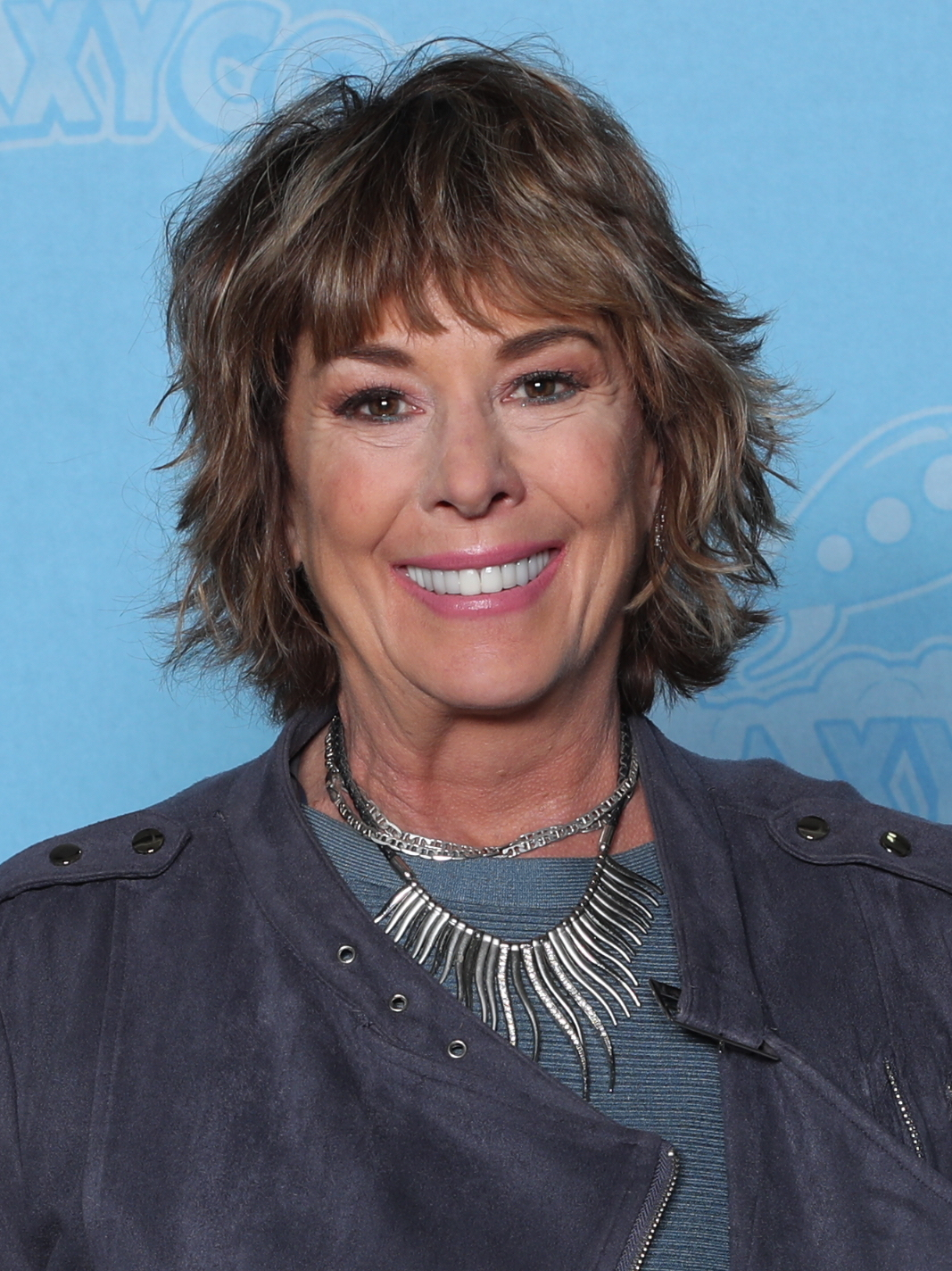
Belle's voice actress, Paige O'Hara.

Already 30 years-old by the time of her audition, O'Hara naturally imbued Belle's voice with maturity despite her character's young age, reflecting Woolverton's vision. In addition to sharing Belle's love of reading, O'Hara empathized with her character being ostracized by her peers due to unconventional interests, explaining, "I was into musical theater ... while people were going to Led Zeppelin concerts ... I had a one-track mind, and I think that Belle was like that a lot". The actress worked on the film on-and-off for over two years, and completed the entire script during her first day of recording. She identified the scene where Belle is gifted the Beast's library among the fastest she recorded due to her own love of books, "so all I had to imagine was that my husband gave me that library".

She initially found it challenging to soften her voice during recording sessions due to having been trained to project as a stage performer. Despite its costliness and technical complexity, O'Hara and actor Robby Benson, voice of the Beast, were granted permission from Disney to record in the same booth as opposed to separately, becoming some of the few voice actors to do so for a Disney project. O'Hara credited these intimate recording sessions with helping Belle and the Beast's relationship sound more convincing. One example is the scene in which the Beast discovers that Belle has disobeyed him by entering the forbidden West Wing, resulting in a heated confrontation. She also recorded some material with Richard White, Gaston's voice actor. Although O'Hara would occasionally ad-lib per her directors' encouragement, none of her improvisation was included in the final film. Despite her successful stage career, O'Hara was virtually unknown to Hollywood when she was cast in Beauty and the Beast; she was one of the last obscure actors cast in a feature-length Disney animated film before the studio shifted towards casting celebrity talent in subsequent animated projects.

Since the film's release, O'Hara has reprised her role in a variety of follow-up films, tie-in media, and merchandise, including its direct-to-video sequels Beauty and the Beast: The Enchanted Christmas (1997), Belle's Magical World (1998), and Belle's Tales of Friendship (1999). In 2010, O'Hara said she was recording new material for Belle's merchandise as often as eight times per year. In 2012, O'Hara described Disney as her "main employer for 20 years". She voiced Belle in high-profile projects such as the animated film Ralph Breaks the Internet (2018) and the animated/live-action short Once Upon a Studio (2023). O'Hara partnered with Disney Fine Art – Collector's Editions to create a collection of original artwork inspired by the film, entitled "Belles by Belle".

=== Personality ===
According to producer Don Hahn, the original fairy tale's Belle is an "incredibly passive" character, the personality of whom he likened to Aurora from Sleeping Beauty (1959) and Cinderella, as well as actress Doris Day, describing them as women who are "capable, but filling a role that women might fill in the 1950s and 1960s". In a concerted effort to update the "Beauty and the Beast" story and characters for the 1990s, Woolverton and the filmmakers reworked Belle into a more three-dimensional character by imbuing her with goals and aspirations beyond romance and marriage, resulting in an unusual, inquisitive heroine. Woolverton worked particularly closely with Ashman to create a proactive, thinking, and literate character who is not a victim and cares little about how she looks, wanting her to defy the template of Disney heroines "taking all of this abuse, smiling and talking to little animals through it all". Although Belle being well-read is mentioned in the source material, this trait is hardly integral to the plot. Therefore, Belle's passion for reading was greatly expanded upon for the film, borrowing elements from both Little Women's Jo March and Woolverton's own love of books to emphasize the character's intelligence and open-mindedness. Woolverton confirmed that much of Belle's personality was inspired by her own.

Both Woolverton and O'Hara encouraged the filmmakers to highlight Belle's intelligence and love for books, but the animators occasionally faced challenges realizing Woolverton's vision. Initially, Belle was storyboarded constantly crying during her imprisonment, but Woolverton argued that Belle would more likely be occupied with planning an escape or being intrigued by her new life in an enchanted castle. Contrarily, character animator Kathy Zielinski, despite not working on Beauty and the Beast herself, recalled a male story artist consulting her about whether she would cry in Belle's situation, to which she responded "Yes ... But no blubbering". However, Woolverton also noted that once the team realized Belle would not conform to typical Disney female tropes, they tended to push her characterization to the opposite extreme, making her "bitchy", a portrayal Woolverton felt was inconsistent with Belle's intelligence.

Due to her personality and aspirations, the film's cast and crew considers Belle to be a revolutionary Disney heroine and the first of her kind in many ways. Among other notable attributes, she was not born a princess. Robby Benson considers her the film's true hero. Story artist Brenda Chapman, who also tried "to portray a different kind of female heroine from other Disney movies", echoed these sentiments, describing Belle as a strong, proactive female character and one of her favorite projects. Similarly to Woolverton, Chapman drew inspiration from Hepburn's on-screen bickering with actor Spencer Tracy for some of Belle's arguments with the Beast. Wise was aware that comparisons to Ariel would be inevitable due to similarities between the two films, and sought to make her personality distinct from the mermaid by writing her as older, wiser, more sophisticated, and extremely protective of her father, in contrast to Ariel's "All-American teen-ager" naivety and impulsiveness. A few years older than Ariel, Belle's love of reading establishes the character as worldlier, more mature, and more cautious about falling in love than her predecessor. Henn believes Belle is "probably" the oldest of Disney's princesses. Both he and O'Hara estimated her to be in her early 20s, while animation historian Jim Korkis estimates her to be 18 or 19 years-old.

=== Design and animation ===
Early concept art of Belle was revised to help her appear less glamorous and more relatable. Some of concept artist Alyson Hamilton's drawings depicted her wearing a pink dress, curlier hair, and softer, more feminine makeup. Before being assigned to Gaston, Andreas Deja had wanted to animate Belle. Belle's supervising animators were James Baxter and Mark Henn. Baxter was selected because "his work has this graceful effortlessness to it", according to Wise, and he oversaw a team of eight animators who worked on Belle. The animator said drawing a beautiful character like Belle can pose unique challenges because "she can become very ugly very quickly—all it takes is a few misplaced lines". Baxter based Belle's appearance on preliminary sketches Chapman and story supervisor Roger Allers had already created for the character, retaining elements such as her round face and European features, while exaggerating her eyes, lips, and eyebrows to appear more "exotic" at the directors' behest. They agreed the character should be brunette, a hair color Disney had never used for their princesses prior. Baxter studied the work of French impressionist Edgar Degas, whose ballerina portraits inspired the animator to incorporate "graceful, swan-like movements" into Belle's gait, as well as footage of ballerinas. Despite these inspirations, Baxter avoided relying too heavily on the ballerina motif to prevent Belle from becoming too prissy at the cost of her believability because they wanted her movements to reflect self-reliance, capability, and practicality, despite her beauty and gracefulness. Trousdale explained that, compared to a fantasy character like Ariel, animating Belle granted the artists less room for imagination because "Everybody knows how a pretty [human] girl looks and walks". Baxter described maintaining her locomotion as "very tricky" due to the subtlety and realism required to animate it, unlike a more cartoonish character. For complicated scenes requiring a lot of movement, Baxter drew either every frame or every other frame, but limited himself to four-six frames for relaxed scenes, often completing as many as 25 drawings per day. Additionally, she is on screen for a combined total of half an hour, nearly twice as long as any of the film's other characters.

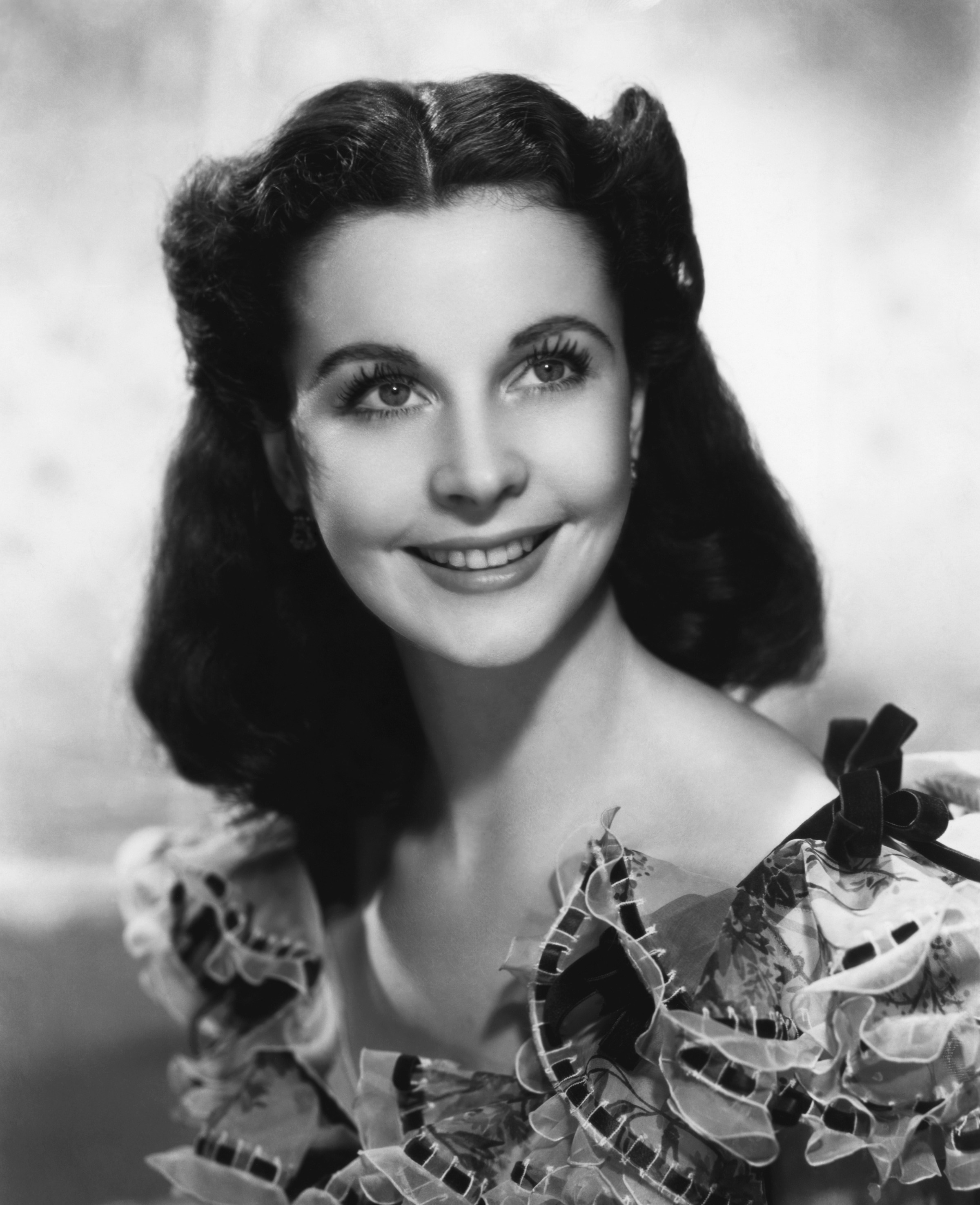
British actress Vivien Leigh was one of several classical Hollywood actresses who inspired Belle's physical appearance.

Wanting Belle to look more European than Ariel, the animators drew her with fuller lips, narrower eyes, and darker eyebrows inspired by British actress Vivien Leigh, while her statuesque frame was inspired by teen idols Jennie Garth and Alyssa Milano. Additional inspiration was drawn from Judy Garland in The Wizard of Oz (1939) and Julie Andrews in The Sound of Music (1965). Belle was Henn's second Disney heroine, after Ariel. He animated select scenes from out of the studio's Florida division, which included Belle sneaking into the West Wing, bandaging the Beast's arm, and the "Something There" musical sequence. For visual inspiration and reference, Henn decorated his workstation with photographs of several classic Hollywood actresses, including Natalie Wood, Elizabeth Taylor, Grace Kelly, and Audrey Hepburn. Lorna Cook, Belle's only female animator, filmed herself to create reference footage for some of the character's reaction shots, while calling upon her own memories to avoid stereotypes and visually convey Belle's inner beauty. Henn said Belle's final appearance began to materialize once he heard O'Hara's voice for the first time, from which point on the animators merged their drawings with her performance. O'Hara found the photographs of "all these beautiful women" intimidating, but Cook reassured her that they would reference her own photographs as well. While working on Beauty and the Beast, Henn rarely met O'Hara in person aside from select occasions when he would travel to California for production meetings. Meanwhile, the animators dissuaded O'Hara from seeing unfinished drawings of her character.

Animators videotaped O'Hara's recording sessions to incorporate some of her mannerisms, expressions, and gestures into her character. Actress and writer Sherri Stoner also served as the character's live-action reference model. Because she had performed the same service for Ariel, Stoner made a concerted effort to not recycle some of Ariel's habits such as lip biting, which was deemed "not in Belle's character". Although Baxter reviewed Stoner's footage thoroughly, he avoided replicating many of her extraneous movements so his drawings would not look unnatural. Belle's tendency to brush strands of hair out of her face was inspired by both Stoner and O'Hara, which Henn had noticed the latter doing constantly "no matter how much hairspray she uses". The animators also borrowed elements of O'Hara's eyes, cheekbones, and eyebrows. The actress said that while some fans agree that there is a resemblance, others argue that her character does not look like her whatsoever. O'Hara felt early renditions of Belle looked flawless and expressed concerns that children would find her difficult to relate to until the animators redesigned her. She described the final design of Belle as much easier to identify with, despite remaining beautiful. Animation historian Charles Solomon observed some quality inconsistencies in Belle's appearance throughout the film, writing, "The prettiest and liveliest Belle waltzes with Beast in his marble ballroom and weeps over his body before he's transformed into the Prince", while "The Belle who receives the library from Beast has wider-set eyes and a more prominent mouth than the noticeably slimmer Belle who sings 'Something There'." Critic Mari Ness attributed the variances to different animators working on the same character from different locations, explaining, "all of the overnight delivery systems in the world couldn't compensate for those factors".

Belle undergoes four distinct costume changes in the film. The colours she wears throughout the film mirror her emotions, with blue indicating sadness, loneliness, and goodness in direct contrast to Gaston's red, and yellow showing her warming up towards the Beast. McEntee suggested that Belle be the only character wearing blue in her village to emphasize her ostracization. The Beast also wears blue, signaling their emotional connection to audiences. Coincidentally, O'Hara wore blue on several occasions while involved with the film, including her audition and premieres. Her ball gown was inspired by a costume Audrey Hepburn's character wears in the romantic comedy Roman Holiday (1953). Hahn designed it with a small team of male filmmakers. The film's marketing department had originally wanted the dress to be pink to appeal to female audiences, but art director Brian McEntee preferred gold to distinguish Belle from other Disney princesses. McEntee confirmed that, despite the film being set in the 18th century, much of Belle's aesthetic is lifted directly from 1990s trends, drawing inspiration from cover girls Isabella Rossellini and Cindy Crawford.

== Characterization and themes ==
Woolverton created Belle as part of "her self-directed mandate to move women and girls forward." The Express-Times described the character as an intelligent young woman who "sings songs about reading and wanting to gain knowledge, rather than falling in love." Woolverton credits Belle's knowledge and love of books with providing the character with a "point of view of her life and that doesn't necessarily involve a man getting her there." One of the film's main themes, Belle is considered an outsider because her love of reading provides her with knowledge of the outside world as opposed to her "narrow-minded" village peers. Writing for Wired.com, Matt Blum dubbed Belle "the geekiest heroine of any Disney animated film", exemplified by an opening number that demonstrates just how much she does not fit in with her peers due to her intelligence and active imagination. Similarly, Boxoffice's Amy Nicholson coined the character "Disney's Smartest Heroine", while Rob Burch of The Hollywood News observed that the character "comes across as arrogant at times" because she "spends much of the first act complaining." In her book Sex, Love and Abuse: Discourses on Domestic Violence and Sexual Assault, author Sharon Hayes described Belle as "the quintessential beautiful young ingénue." Comparing Belle's personality to that of the princess in the Brothers Grimm's fairy tale "The Frog Prince", The Meanings of "Beauty and the Beast": A Handbook author Jerry Griswold described the character as a similarly "feisty and outspoken" heroine. Writing for St. Francis Xavier University, Dawn Elizabeth England observed that Belle possesses equally as many traditionally feminine as she does masculine traits, citing her bravery, independence and assertiveness as masculine, and her sensitivity and fearfulness as feminine. According to Hard Bodies: Hollywood Masculinity in the Reagan Era author Susan Jeffords, "Belle's credentials as heroine are established ... when she is the only one of the town's single women not to swoon over Gaston," while the character's love of reading is essentially manipulated "to mark her as better than the rest of the townspeople." Writing for The Statesman, David O'Connor cited Belle's intelligence and bibliophilia as "in stark opposition to the insensitive and significantly dim-witted Gaston." Critics continue to debate over whether Belle or the Beast is the film's protagonist. Susan Jeffords, author of Hard Bodies: Hollywood Masculinity in the Reagan Era, felt that although Belle appears to be the protagonist in Beaumont's original fairy tale, the character becomes "less the focus of the narrative" in Disney's adaptation and more of a "mechanism for solving the Beast's 'dilemma.'" In her article "The Tangled Evolution of the Disney Princess," Noelle Buffam felt that Belle arrived just in time when Disney's heroines were "in a dire need for some change," awarding her "the red stamp of approval" for her intelligence and spirit.

Analyzing ways in which Disney's heroines have evolved over time due to "the approach to the characterization of the princesses chang[ing]" as the characters gradually transformed from passive young women into heroines who "had ambitions and desires aside from finding true love," critics often divide the Disney Princesses into three separate categories and rank Belle among the middle of the timeline, with Kit Steinkellner of HelloGiggles.com observing that the character improved upon "the Disney princess archetype" by simultaneously serving as both a "dreamer" and a "doer" in her film, as opposed to exclusively the former. Film historian Paula Sigman Lowery explained to the Daily Express that Belle's personality is a combination of Ariel's spirit and burgeoning independence, and Pocahontas' maturity, while Belle is "a little older [than Ariel] and a little further along in their journey towards independence." About.com's David Nusair believes that Belle belongs to a category of Disney Princesses known as "The Lady Vanishes", in which the heroines, in spite of being brave, outspoken and independent, nonetheless "are forced to behave passively as others help them achieve their respective goals." Michelle Munro, writing for Durham College, felt that even though Belle shares several traits with her more passive predecessors, the character introduced "new possibilities for princesses." Girls in Capes wrote that Belle pioneered a generation of princesses who taught "about ambition, self-discovery and the pursuit of what we want."

== Reception ==
=== Critical response ===
Belle has received mostly positive reviews from film critics, who praised her bravery, intelligence, independence, and maturity. Journalist Janet Maslin said that by deviating from the film's source material, Disney created "a conspicuously better role model than the marriage-minded Disney heroines of the past". Similarly, Utah State University assistant professor Claudia Schwabe said that Disney produced a "uniquely modern heroine" who is curious, feisty, and intellectual by changing Beaumont's heroine, who by contrast struggles with an "initial inability to see beyond appearances". Jennie Punter of The Globe and Mail described Belle as a "smart, courageous ... 'take-charge kind of gal'", and the film's "main attraction". Martin F. Kohn of the Detroit Free Press called her a "wonderful lead character". Both Emma Cochrane of Empire and Annlee Ellingson of Paste complimented the character's feminism, with the former calling Belle "more rounded than previous Disney characters". According to film critic Stephen Hunter, Belle is "no passive fairy tale princess, but a real live girl, with a spunky personality and her own private agenda". A reviewer for TV Guide thought the film's plot was improved by Belle's bravery, confidence, and independence, which About.com's David Nusair called "nothing short of admirable". Journalist Marc Bernardin deemed Belle "the hero" of Beauty and the Beast, which he also described as the best of Disney's princess films. Bob Hoose of Plugged In called her inspiring for being willing to set her dreams aside to protect her father, and associate professor Sarah Coyne said Belle's sacrifice allows parents and children to "focus more on her bravery ... as opposed to glitter and the glam" of a warrior-type princess.

Many critics praised Belle as a departure from previous Disney princess characters, noting that she avoided some of the negative tropes associated with her predecessors. Aslıhan Alp of The Stanford Daily called her a "great example of Disney's development" by emphasizing a woman's intelligence over her beauty. Entertainment Weekly's Christian Blauvelt said, "Unlike previous Disney heroines who needed to be rescued by a prince themselves, Belle not only saves the Beast's life, she saves his soul". AllMovie's Don Kaye and Perry Seibert echoed each other's reviews, with the latter calling Belle a "strong female character" who "sidesteps most of the clichés surrounding Disney heroines". Common Sense Media hailed Belle as a positive role model and "one of Disney's smartest, most independent heroines". Journalist Jennifer Roback Morse said Belle's appeal had never relied on her "embodiment of some new feminist protagonist", but rather her kindness, faithfulness, and selflessness, "the same reasons we have always loved our heroines". In The Washington Post, linguist Carmen Fought said that, like The Little Mermaid, critics deemed Beauty and the Beast superior to other princess films of the time period because "They have 'active women who get things done'". In 2022, Matthew Stewart and Paul Sheehan of Gold Derby ranked Belle the second-best Disney Princess, calling her "one of the smartest, bravest, and most tender-hearted characters the Disney company has ever created" who "serves as a source of inspiration for all women".

Several critics preferred Belle over Ariel, her immediate predecessor. Film critic Hal Hinson described Belle as a "compelling" character who he found "more mature, more womanly and less blandly asexual" than the mermaid. John Hartl of The Seattle Times said Beauty and the Beast avoids déjà vu by making Belle a "more poignant" heroine. Boxoffice wrote, "in response to criticism that the cute little 'Mermaid' Ariel was nothing more than a precocious sexpot", Belle's creators "chose to make her an icon of self-reliance and a voracious reader with a curiosity and love for everything around her". Critics also praised O'Hara's performance. The Star-Ledger's Stephen Whitty enjoyed O'Hara's "pretty soprano". Hartl said she "does a spirited job of investing the character with warmth, intuition and maturity", while the Sun-Sentinel's Candice Russel felt she "does a good job of creating Belle as intellectual, wisely feminine and disarmed by the stirrings of her heart".

One of the character's few negative reviews was written by Ethan Alter of Television Without Pity, who felt what agency Belle had was compromised by her "maternalistic streak" towards both the Beast and Maurice. Meanwhile, journalist Tom Brook said despite her strong will, she loses some of her own identity once she "starts seeing the world from the perspective of the beast".

=== Feminist analysis ===
Disney has marketed Belle as a feminist since 1991, which authors Timothy B. Cargal and Claudia Mitchell believe embodies the studio's initiative to update their heroines to reflect timely social concepts such as third-wave feminism and girl power. Most critics and advocates initially applauded Disney's efforts to position Belle as more feminist than her predecessors by promoting her intelligence and courage, qualities that resonated with girls during the 1990s. Hayden Manders of Nylon dubbed her "the internet's favorite feminist princess". According to Constance Grady of Vox, Belle's agency is a key reason critics argue that she is an empowered feminist. Although some journalists consider her a feminist icon, feminist scholars have long debated and reevaluated the character's feminist qualifications. According to Kathi Maio of New Internationalist, the character's love of reading remains her only genuinely feminist strength, despite Disney's marketing strategy. Daniel Wayland of The Brown Daily Herald reported that, since 1991, Belle has been a contentious topic among feminist scholars, some of whom argue that her personality is not truly representative of empowerment, but rather a superficial marker that merely implies agency. Some critics have contested that she is hardly shown reading during the film and found her literary interests limited to fiction, fairy tales, and fantasy. Alfonso Pizano of The Jesuit Post said that despite the studio's intentions, Belle doesn't fully reach her potential, as she is depicted primarily reading romances, has vague aspirations, and continues to exhibit some familiar Disney princess tropes. Jezebel acknowledged that Belle is often regarded "as the standard of the 'feminist' Disney princess", but questioned why her actions are afforded more grace than Ariel's.

Interpretations of Belle's role have been widely debated, with opinions remaining divided. Slate critic Rebecca Onion felt the film's efforts to make Belle feminist are weakened by establishing beauty as one of her defining characteristics. While the animated film was initially praised for featuring a progressive feminist lead, some critics argue that, despite Belle's resistance to Gaston, the story is ultimately about her seeking an "ideal man". Michelle Ruiz of Vogue and Manders noted that despite her intelligence and independence, Belle still settles down with a prince in a castle, like other Disney princesses. Nancy Reagin of Twilight and History and Kathleen Maher of The Austin Chronicle criticized Belle for reinforcing traditional ideas of marriage fulfillment, with Maher considering her an example of pseudo-feminism for exchanging a common man for a prince. Judith Welikala of The Independent commended Belle for seeing beyond the Beast's appearance but argued that she reverts to domesticity once he becomes a prince. Andrew Teverson, author of Fairy Tale, and Phyllis Frus, author of Beyond Adaptation, considered Belle a response to feminist critiques of earlier Disney heroines, but criticized her curiosity as defined by romance. In Refinery29's "Definitive Ranking of Disney Princesses as Feminist Role Models", Vanessa Golembewski ranked Belle eighth, calling her ambitions "confusing". Claire Fallon of HuffPost noted that, in hindsight, Belle no longer seems as independent compared to newer heroines, but she laid the groundwork for stronger female leads. Ariane Lange of BuzzFeed saw Belle as a step toward a more independent archetype, crediting the women involved in her creation. Muireann O'Shea of the College Tribune pointed to Elsa, Tiana, Moana, Pocahontas, and Mulan as stronger feminist role models. Writer Mayukh Sen criticized the film's polished aesthetic for limiting the portrayal of Belle as a more compelling feminist figure and suggested that Woolverton's original vision for the character, which he believed was compromised by creative conflicts, might have better portrayed Belle as a more complex feminist.

Feminist discourse surrounding Belle was revived by the 2017 live-action remake, with actress Emma Watson heavily promoting the character's feminist qualities and her efforts to update Belle into a more independent woman. O'Shea argued that if feminism is defined by agency, Belle already met that standard, and Watson's revisions neither significantly strengthened nor weakened the original film's message. In retrospect, some critics have reassessed Belle's relationship with the Beast, arguing that it romanticizes domestic abuse by suggesting that women's kindness can reform their abusive partners. Melanie Hamlett of Paste observed that the film's major male characters either seek to control, imprison, or be saved by Belle. Writing for the University of Central Florida, Faith Dickens argued that Belle's character development is overshadowed by the Beast's struggles, with her passion for adventure giving way to romance. Similarly, scholar Henry A. Giroux believes Belle is relegated to "a prop for resolving the Beast's problems". Anna E. Altmann, author of Tales, Then and Now: More Folktales as Literary Fictions for Young Adults, found Belle's relationships with both the Beast and Maurice to be overly motherly. Sonia Saraiya of Nerve ranked Belle the sixth-most feminist Disney princess, writing that, unlike Ariel, her defiance stems from intellect rather than teenage rebellion. She commended Belle for resisting societal expectations but argued that, despite her bravery, she ultimately falls for a domineering man. Similarly, writer Kit Steinkellner expressed concern about "abusive undercurrents" in Belle and the Beast's relationship, despite her proactive nature. Bustle's Mary Grace Garis also praised Belle's aspirations and love of reading while critiquing her relationship with the Beast.

Over time, some critics have argued that Belle exhibits Stockholm syndrome, suggesting that she develops feelings for the Beast while being held captive. Jessica Mason of The Mary Sue said, despite her progressiveness, Belle's legacy is complicated by "problematic aspect[s]" of her story, which ultimately prevent Beauty and the Beast from being feminist. Writers for Mother Jones called Belle "a near-perfect heroine", if not for the Stockholm syndrome, abuse, and kidnapping allegations, as well as double standards perpetuating "that girls are often taught to fall in love with men for who they are and not how they look, while men in Disney movies (and beyond) so often fall in love with women because of their beauty". Woolverton refuted this interpretation, stating that Belle's love and kindness lead to the Beast's transformation without compromising her own identity. Chapman also defended the character, saying that their only intention had been to create a heroine who saves her father and just happens to reform a beastly character, as opposed to what some interpret as "an abused woman hanging out with her abusive captor". Rebecca Lewis of Metro initially supported the Stockholm syndrome argument but later reassessed her stance, concluding in 2017 that Belle's autonomy in her decisions makes her "a feminist ... character that women around the world need right now". In 2017, psychiatrist Frank Ochberg, who had originally helped put the term into use, stated that "the case for Beauty and the Beast not being Stockholm syndrome is stronger than the case of it being Stockholm syndrome", explaining that Belle's dynamic with the Beast lacks much of the trauma bonding required to qualify for the condition. Ultimately, Ochberg described Belle as brave, courageous, and "a nice heroic story from a feminist point of view". Discussing Belle's mixed reception, Rebecca Farley of Refinery29 described her as "the Disney princess we all love to hate", noting that some of her actions have been viewed as questionable. However, she also regarded Belle as a compelling heroine due to her unconventional nature. Additionally, Belle has been criticized for being portrayed in isolation from other strong female characters, which some argue suggests that she is "the only worthwhile woman around".

== Cultural impact ==
In 2012, Todd Gilchrist of Boxoffice Pro deemed Belle an "iconoclast" who remains just as exciting as when the film was released over 20 years prior. Belle is regarded as a pop culture icon. Journalists for Time and Harper's Bazaar consider the character to be Disney's first feminist princess. Some reporters believe her characterization as one of Disney's first proactive princesses helped revolutionize how princess characters would be depicted in animated media. (Note: Attributed to multiple references:) According to Amy Ratcliffe of Nerdist, she "opened the door into a new era where the female protagonist of a Disney movie wasn't motivated by love". Filmmaker Mamoru Hosoda believes Disney's treatment of Belle triggered a "major shift" towards the presence of independent, intelligent fairy tale heroines, and cited the character as an inspiration on Belle (2021), his own retelling of the "Beauty and the Beast" fairy tale. Emma Gray, senior women's reporter for HuffPost, said "For women who grew up in the late '80s and early '90s, few characters loom larger than Belle", crediting her interest in reading over marriage with offering "a portrait of a more empowered Disney princess". According to Kevin Fallon of The Daily Beast, Belle challenged the conventional Disney princess, one he described as "singing songs about how much you love combing your hair with a fork and giving away your voice if it meant you got to marry the guy with that dreamy chiseled jaw". Animation historian Charles Solomon considers Belle one of four Disney princesses responsible for breaking conventional restrictions, and film critic Chris Nashawaty said she helped establish Disney's second generation of princesses as independent instead of damsels in distress. Writing for Virgin Media, Limara Salt believes the character "proved that audiences could fall in love with a brown-haired intellectual". A survey conducted by Disney after the film's release claims to have discovered that Belle's affinity for reading inspired young women to read. In 1991, Disney Press released Belle's Book of Books, a journal in which fans were encouraged to write about their favourite books. In 2015, writers for Time and Stylist said Belle is arguably one of the most famous bookworms in pop culture. According to Emily Rome of Uproxx, she "became an immediate favorite for any girl who ... would rather have her nose stuck in a book than doing just about anything else". The character is also revered as a positive role model for young women. According to a poll reported by Parents, Belle was voted the best Disney Princess role model based on over 2,400 parents surveyed.

Belle is the fifth member of the Disney Princess franchise, and is frequently recognized as one of its most popular and enduring characters. Tyler B. Searle of Collider, who ranked her the second-best protagonist from the Disney Renaissance, remarked that she is often considered "one of if not the best Disney princesses". Patricia Garcia of Vogue described her as "a welcome exception to the Disney princess stereotype" due to her bravery, adventurous nature, and love of reading. Similarly, Kayleigh Dray of Stylist referred to her as "one of the least two-dimensional characters in the original Disney Princess line-up". Kim Renfro of Business Insider credited Belle with contributing to a new era of modern Disney heroines, and Vicki Arkoff of TLC noted that the character helped "break Disney's passive-princess mold". Belle has consistently ranked highly in polls and media lists evaluating Disney Princesses. A 2020 international survey reported by Marie Claire found her to be the most popular princess in nine countries and the fourth overall. She was ranked first in separate polls by E!, ComingSoon.net, and HuffPost, second by the Harvard Law Record, Refinery29 and /Film, third by the Yale Daily News, fourth by Cosmopolitan, fifth by USA Today, Seventeen, BuzzFeed, and IGN, and sixth by Paste. Cristina Alexander of IGN described her as "one of the first modern Disney Princesses to break the stereotype of how princesses behave". In terms of commercial success, Belle was the fifth most successful Disney Princess based on box office performance as of 2014, with Beauty and the Beast grossing over $350 million worldwide. Despite this, she was the lowest-selling Disney Princess on eBay in 2013, generating under $7,000 in merchandise sales, although she is frequently cited as a customer favorite.

As Disney heroines go, Belle was an iconoclast. Her strong-willed, independent personality feels invigorating in a medium where most damsels are in distress. That was definitely true 20 years ago when Beauty was released, and it's still half-true today.

— Boxoffice Pro's Todd Gilchrist explaining the way in which Belle altered Disney heroines for the 20th and 21st centuries.

Belle is widely regarded as one of Disney's most beloved heroines, (Note: Attributed to multiple references:) whose popularity film historian Justin Humphreys of The Hook described as "staggering". In 2016, Scott Huver of People said the character's "popularity remains a force to be reckoned with" over 25 years after the film's release. Kelsie Gibson of People declared her among "the most recognizable animated characters of all time", and a writer for the Yale Daily News called her "One of Disney's best heroines". In 2023, The A.V. Club ranked Belle the 10th greatest animated Disney character of all time, deeming her essential to Beauty and the Beast's reputation as one of Disney's greatest films. Business Insider readers voted Belle the 15th most iconic female film character. Belle was the only animated heroine nominated for the American Film Institute's 50 greatest heroes ranking. She was ranked Disney's second most iconic character by the Daily Mirror, behind only Mickey and Minnie Mouse. Meanwhile, PopMatters ranked her Disney's second-best hero. People described her as one of "The World's Most Beautiful Cartoon Characters" in 2016. The character was ranked 64th on UGO's list of the most attractive female cartoon characters, and 14th on Complex's "25 Hottest Cartoon Women of All Time". Considered to be a style icon, E! ranked Belle the second best-dressed Disney Princess. Her ball gown is widely regarded as one of the most famous dresses in film history. Belle appeared on Stylist's list of the "Best beauty looks in Disney" twice, for both her hairstyles. As of 2022, Entertainment Weekly ranked Belle's hairstyles seventh among the Disney princesses.

According to journalist Emily Zemler, characters like Belle helped prove that strong female protagonists are capable of drawing audiences into theatres. Becoming a prolific screenwriter after Beauty and the Beast, Woolverton has achieved notoriety for her dedication to writing strong female characters. Since Belle, most of Woolverton's heroines have been headstrong and independent, namely Nala from The Lion King (1994), Mulan from Mulan (1998), Alice from Alice in Wonderland (2010), and Maleficent from Maleficent (2014). Susan Wloszczyna of IndieWire said Woolverton's Belle "set a new standard for fully fleshed-out fairy-tale heroines", in turn paving the way for Katniss Everdeen from The Hunger Games, and Anna and Elsa from Frozen (2013). Woolverton remains protective of Belle. In Beauty and the Beast, Belle performs the film's opening number, "Belle", which was nominated for the Academy Award for Best Original Song at the 64th Academy Awards in 1992. To commemorate her work on Beauty and the Beast and various contributions to Disney, O'Hara was honored with a Disney Legends award on August 19, 2011. Susan Egan, who originated the role of Belle in the Broadway production, was also honored as a Disney Legend in 2026 for her portrayal and for her other contributions to the company.

== In other media ==
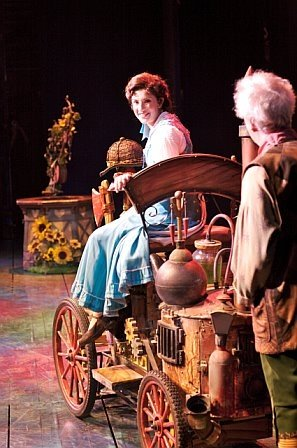
Anneliese van der Pol as Belle in the stage musical

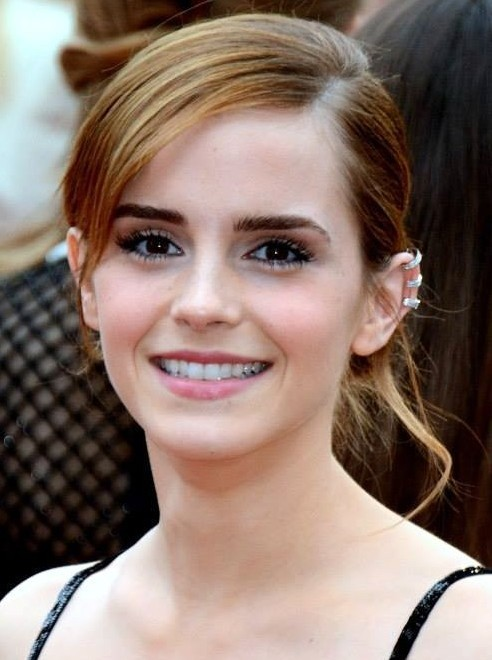
English actress Emma Watson portrays Belle in the 2017 live-action film.

In 1994, Susan Egan originated the role of Belle on Broadway in the stage adaptation of the film. Egan's manager insisted that she audition despite the actress initially having reservations that adapting a cartoon for Broadway "was a terrible idea". She ultimately turned down callbacks for productions of My Fair Lady, Carousel, and Grease because she had always wanted to originate a Broadway role. Egan had never watched Beauty and the Beast prior to auditioning, and instead relied on her "creative instincts" to avoid imitating O'Hara. Her performance was critically praised and received a Tony Award nomination for Best Actress in a Musical at the 48th Tony Awards. At least 20 actresses played Belle on Broadway until the show closed in 2007, with Anneliese van der Pol in the role. Sarah Litzsinger remains Broadway's longest-running Belle, while Christy Carlson Romano was the character's youngest performer, at age 19. Singer Toni Braxton was the only Black woman to play Belle on Broadway. The ballad "A Change in Me" was written specifically for Braxton when she joined the cast in 1998, and has been retained in the musical ever since.

Lynsey McLeod played Belle on the television series Sing Me a Story with Belle (1995–97), in which the character owns a bookshop where she tells and sings stories to patrons. Emma Watson played Belle in the 2017 live-action remake of the film. Watson suggested several changes to modernize the character's personality and costumes, including refusing to wear a corset and opting for riding boots to preserve her mobility. In this version of the film, Belle is also an inventor like her father, and uses her inventions to grant herself more time to read. Her mother is revealed to have died when Belle was an infant, resulting in Maurice being overprotective of her. Critics noted Watson's performance as a standout in the remake, although reactions to her singing were mixed. (Note: Attributed to multiple references:) In 2022, H.E.R. portrayed Belle in a musical television special commemorating the 30th anniversary of the animated film, becoming the first Afro-Filipino to play the character onscreen.

Belle has appeared in several other Disney film and television projects outside the Beauty and the Beast franchise. She has a cameo in the animated film The Hunchback of Notre Dame (1996) during the "Out There" musical sequence. The character is briefly shown from above walking while reading a book, in a similar setting to her Beauty and the Beast hometown. Belle appeared in the animated television series House of Mouse (2001–2003) and its two direct-to-video films. The animated series Sofia the First features a guest appearance from Belle in the episode "The Amulet and the Anthem" (2013). She shares several scenes with other Disney Princesses in Ralph Breaks the Internet (2018), and appears in the Walt Disney Animation Studios short film Once Upon a Studio (2023). Emilie de Ravin plays a version of Belle on the television series Once Upon a Time as the love interest of Rumplestiltskin, the show's iteration of the Beast. Keegan Connor Tracy plays the character in the Descendants film series (2017–2019), in which she is the Queen of the United States of Auradon and shares a son, Ben, with the Beast.

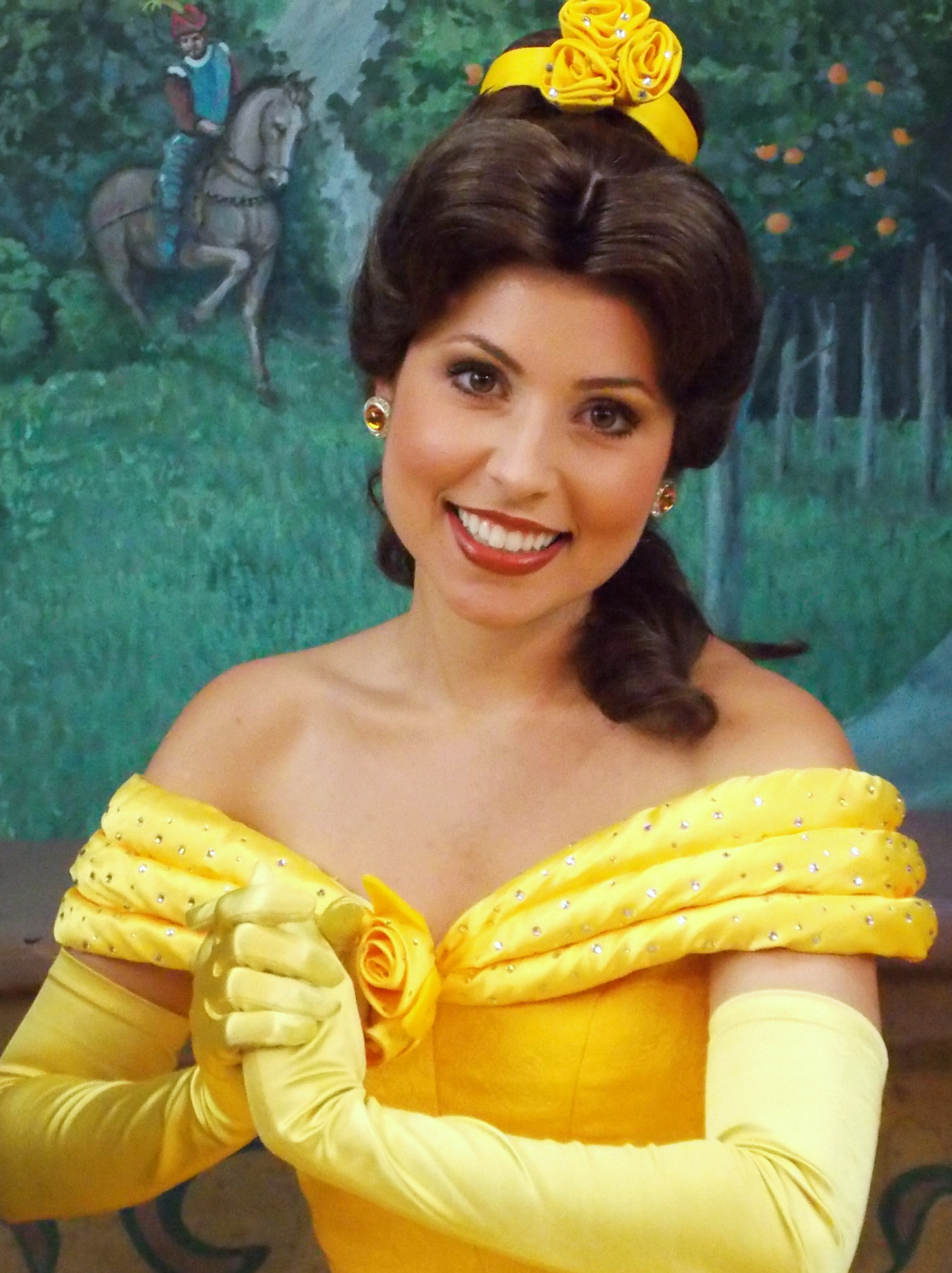
Belle, as she appears at the Disney Parks.

Belle was the main character in various comic book adaptations of the film, including a graphic novel by Bobbi J. G. Weiss, and 1995 Marvel Comics series set during Belle's stay at the castle, specifically some time after the Beast gifts her the library. A prequel series set several years before the film was published distributed by Disney Comics. She makes regular appearances at Disney parks and events. Belle and the other characters from the first film appear in the stage show, Beauty and the Beast Live on Stage at Disney's Hollywood Studios, Walt Disney World. Belle also appears in a meet-and-greet attraction at Magic Kingdom's Fantasyland called Enchanted Tales with Belle, along with meet-and-greets in all of the other parks worldwide.

In addition to Disney Princess merchandise, Belle has her own line of merchandise that includes clothing, jewelry and housewares. Belle has appeared in various video games. She recurs throughout the Kingdom Hearts series as one of the Princesses of Heart, seven female characters whose hearts lack darkness or corruption potential, and thus pose as threats to the games' antagonists. Belle appears as a playable character to unlock for a limited time in the video game Disney Magic Kingdoms. An alternate version of Belle appears as a playable character in the video game Disney Mirrorverse. She is also featured as a character the player meets during their adventures in Disney Dreamlight Valley alongside Beast and Gaston. In the kart racing game Disney Speedstorm (2023), Belle is a playable racer who can use her enchanted mirror to a variety of effects, including summoning obstacles in front of opponents. Game Rant ranked her one of the best characters in the game.

In 1992, Belle presented the Academy Award for Best Animated Short Film at the 64th Academy Awards, alongside the Beast and Chip. Spanish actress Penélope Cruz posed as Belle in photographer Annie Leibovitz's Disney Dream Portrait Series.
