= Belle's ball gown =

Dress featured in the 1991 film Beauty and the Beast

- Belle's ball gown as it appears for the first time in the original 1991 animated film.
- Designer: Various, including Brian McEntee
- Year: 1991
- Type: Animated off-the-shoulder golden ball gown

In the ballroom scene from Disney's 1991 animated film Beauty and the Beast, during which the fictional character Belle dances with the Beast to the film's titular song, Belle wears an opulent golden off-the-shoulder ball gown with a voluminous tiered skirt that has sashes draped all around it. Although Beauty and the Beast is set in 18th-century France, the dress's streamlined and anachronistic design borrows inspiration from several different fashion eras, with some of its elements centuries removed from its historical setting.

Although art director Brian McEntee had always envisioned the dress as gold, representing Belle's emotional growth into a happier and warmer character, Disney's marketing department wanted a pink dress to appeal to young girls; McEntee convinced the studio that gold would differentiate Belle from previous Disney princesses. The dress has been reimagined for several adaptations of the film, notably by Ann Hould-Ward for the Broadway musical in 1994, by Jacqueline Durran for the 2017 live-action remake in which the costume is worn by actress Emma Watson, and by Marina Toybina for the 2022 television special worn by singer H.E.R. Despite some significant deviations from their animated predecessor, all designs retained the original's signature color.

The dress is considered to be one of the most famous in film history, as well as one of Disney's most renowned outfits. Belle's dress has inspired several iterations in various tie-in media, including toys, video games and television, with an alternate version of the character wearing a similar costume in the television series Once Upon a Time. Replications of the dress have been worn by actresses Penélope Cruz and Hailee Steinfeld.

== History and design ==
In Disney's 1991 animated film Beauty and the Beast, Belle attends dinner with the Beast wearing a golden ball gown. (Note: The original dress from the animated film has alternatively been described as either gold or yellow by various sources, but producer Don Hahn and art director Brian McEntee have called the gown gold or golden.) She slowly enters down the grand staircase before eating and dancing with the Beast, to the tune of the title song performed by Mrs. Potts. The dress is worn during one of Disney's most famous scenes, which in turn contributed to the outfit's popularity among audiences. According to Tracy Brown of the Chicago Tribune, the scene "helped cement the iconic status of Belle's gold dress". The dress is a voluminous and off-the-shoulder tiered ball gown with sashes draped all around its skirt; it is additionally accessorized with a matching headpiece and evening gloves, round earrings and high-heeled shoes, all of which are yellow, with Belle having her hair put in a half-up style to top it all off. Out of her four costume changes, the gold gown is the most opulent dress that Belle wears in the film. Its color also matches that of the ballroom. Screenwriter Linda Woolverton theorized that Belle obtained the dress from the Wardrobe character, who was no longer able to fit into the gown upon being turned into a wardrobe.

A writer for The Times of India believes the dress demonstrates Belle's preference for monochromatic, sometimes ostentatious pieces. Writing for the Los Angeles Times, Paddy Calistro observed that "the cut of Belle's clothes becomes more and more bare" as she falls in love with the Beast, "revealing voluptuous breasts and alluring shoulders". According to Vox contributor Genevieve Valentine, the dress "was lifted out of time, with crinolines and neckline a century removed from the movie's vaguely rococo trappings", believing these details help establish the character's "forward-thinking affinity for the unusual". Glamour fashion historian April Calahan determined that Belle's dresses are not historically accurate because they borrow design elements from entirely different fashion eras. The ball gown in particular is less shapely and omits several layers that would have been common for a typical gown of the time period, additionally lacking a wig or hat to indicate the character's sexual availability. Contrarily, Lacey Womack of Screen Rant believes the dress is fairly historically accurate but less "extreme" than 18th century fashion, observing that Belle's waist should be far more cinched to emphasize the fullness of her skirt. Uproxx contributor Donna Dickens wrote that audiences "believe the amount of petticoats utilized would hold the dress up without a human to support it", despite its lack of historical accuracy. Some critics have speculated that the gown was inspired by a costume actress Audrey Hepburn wears in the film Roman Holiday (1953), but this has not been confirmed by Disney.

=== Background and original animation ===
Beauty and the Beast is believed to be set in 18th-century France. Walt Disney himself had attempted to adapt the fairy tale during the 1940s but the idea was shelved, with an illustration of Belle wearing a gold dress by Kay Nielsen being one of the few surviving artworks from the original project. In animator Andreas Deja's concept art from the film's early development dated 1989, Belle's dresses appear to draw inspiration from anywhere between the 1650s and 1780s. After the success of The Little Mermaid (1989) and popularity of its heroine Ariel, Disney was reminded of the potential their princess characters possess "as a narrative industry". Among several changes made to the film's style, Belle became the studio's "next great hope in establishing a second generation of indelible — and marketable — princesses", with her costumes adopting a cleaner, more anachronistic aesthetic. Dickens believes the animators forwent the intricacies of 18th-century fashion in favor of streamlining Belle's ball gown to save both time and effort.

Beginning with Belle's blue dress during the film's opening scenes, color is used to demonstrate the character's emotional journey throughout her story and differentiate her from other characters. Art director Brian McEntee wanted the dress to be yellow and gold so light could capture as many of her movements as possible, despite the color being difficult to animate at the time. McEntee explained that by the time Belle wears her gold dress, the character has matured and warmed up, dressing her entirely in gold "to show her love and her warmth". Disney's marketing department originally wanted the dress to be pink or lavender to appeal to female audiences. However, McEntee and story artist Chris Sanders convinced the studio to allow the dress to be gold to distinguish Belle from previous Disney princesses, specifically Sleeping Beauty’s (1959) Aurora, who wears pink.

Although the dress is not credited to a specific animator or designer, (Note: Filmmakers commonly associated with designing the dress include art director Brian McEntee, producer Don Hahn, story artist Chris Sanders and supervising animator James Baxter.) producer Don Hahn and McEntee recalled designing it with several male filmmakers while eating pizza and drinking alcohol. Hahn and McEntee find it ironic that, for several years to come, young girls would be wearing a costume that was essentially designed by drunken men. Although several different animators constructed Belle's movements throughout production, only supervising animator James Baxter animated the character and her ball gown during the ballroom scene.

=== 1994 Broadway adaptation ===
Belle's dress was adapted for the Broadway adaptation of the film, which premiered in 1994. The show's costumes were designed by Ann Hould-Ward, who consulted with the film's animators about how they created their characters. Despite resembling the original dress, Hould-Ward based her version of the gown on several historical portraits and artwork. Her daughter, Leah, insisted that the dress remain yellow or gold, prompting crewmembers to nickname its loyalty to the original design "The Leah Factor". Notably, the stage version of the garment adheres to the original 18th century-influenced concept art and time period more closely by incorporating a robe a la française, elbow sleeves, and panniers. Weighing 30–40 pounds (14–18 kg), the completed costume was made of silk and consisted of a hoop skirt, brocade, beading, flowers, bows, lace, and ribbons. The corset-shaped bodice was decorated with various ribbons, bows, flowers and a corsage, all of which contributed to its "classic Belle look". Accessories included a beaded necklace, jewel earrings, floral hairpiece, and cream-colored fishnet elbow-length gloves. Hould-Ward also created a pair of bloomers to be worn underneath the dress, which were embroidered with flowers despite being hidden from the audience.

The weight of the dress would pull actress Susan Egan, who originated the role of Belle, in the opposite of whichever direction she was dancing during "Beauty and the Beast". After the ballroom scene, removing the costume required assistance from three stagehands, who used wires to hoist the dress up into the backstage rafters for storage until its next performance. Belle's costume was the first one completed for the show, since Disney Theatrical Productions wanted the dress to be ready in time for marketing and photoshoots six months prior to rehearsals. Egan was fitted for her costume several months before she met her original castmates. The New York Times published the first colored line-drawing by caricaturist Al Hirschfeld, which depicted Egan and her co-star Terrence Mann in costume as their characters. However, Disney was furious upon discovering that Hirschfeld had painted Belle's dress pink instead of yellow. Hirschfeld defended his work, explaining, "The costumes may have been blue and yellow, but they made me feel green and pink". The lithograph painting is currently estimated at $5,500. The stage utilized a spotlight with a yellow filter that would shine on the dress to saturate its hue.

Egan recalled that young girls would regularly attend shows wearing their own versions of the dress purchased from the Disney Store, with one girl yelling that Egan looks "just like [her]" when the actress appeared on stage one evening. The outburst paused the show momentarily, and prompted laughter from both the audience and cast. Hould-Ward won a Tony Award for Best Costume Design for her work on Beauty and the Beast. The dress was re-designed for R&B singer Toni Braxton when she joined the production as Belle in 1998, with alterations designed to make the costume sexier and more revealing. Braxton also wore a "fringed" version of the dress during the show's curtain call. Although simplified for traveling purposes, the costume's design has remained largely unaltered for subsequent touring productions. For 2023 performances at Sydney’s Capitol Theatre, an updated version of the gown was based on Elizabeth II’s coronation dress, with each petal on the dress being embroidered with between 300-600 crystals, pearls and beads. In 2000, Broadway Cares/Equity Fights created a teddy bear wearing a miniature replica of Belle's costume from the Broadway musical for charity.

=== 2017 live-action remake ===
Costume designer Jacqueline Durran redesigned Belle's ball gown for the film's 2017 live-action remake, in which Belle is portrayed by actress Emma Watson. Durran identified the garment as the most difficult costume to adapt due to the original's popularity, prompting several production discussions about its appearance, color, and material. Never intended to be an exact replica of its animated predecessor, Durran decided to retain its color in homage to the original, but added more texture to "mak[e] it feel like a real living costume.” She felt that simply replicating the dress would result in "a terrible costume" due to the original's comparative simplicity. However, she feared the dress would disappoint fans if it did not invoke the original in some manner, and maintains that she never considered the costume being any color other than yellow. Handkerchief edges and taffeta fabrics were among some of the alternations Durran had considered, in addition to changing the shape of the skirt.

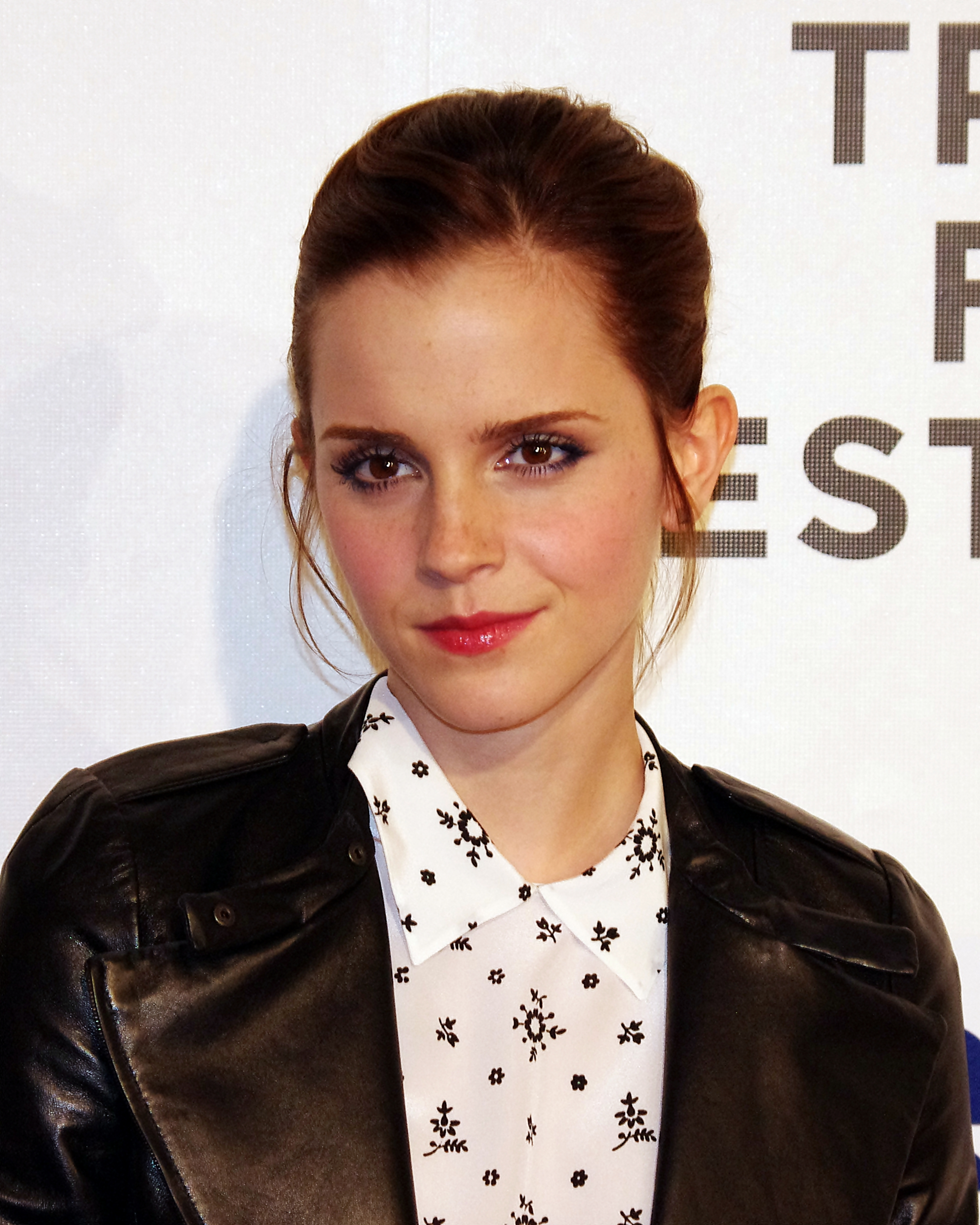
Actress Emma Watson's personal preferences, such as the omission of a corset, influenced the appearance of Belle's dress for the film's 2017 live-action remake, which was designed by Jaqueline Durran.

Durran camera tested several different fabrics to determine the best shade of yellow for the film, as well as how the ballroom's lighting would affect its shade on screen. Watson retained significant creative input over her character's wardrobe, explaining that she did not "want a big princess dress" in favor of moving freely. Watson also insisted that the dress not consist of a corset, fearing the item would restrict her movement. The actress found it most important that the garment "dance beautifully", explaining, "We wanted it to feel like it could float, like it could fly." Willow, the five-year-old daughter of Watson's costar Dan Stevens, drew Watson several sketches of how she felt the dress should look, which Watson took seriously and reviewed with the costume department. Durran also designed a miniature version of the dress for Willow to wear to the film's premiere. The dress underwent several interpretations and re-designs during production, ranging from historically accurate to modern and experimental. Durran ultimately opted for simplicity, describing the costume as a "soft structure built up by with meters and meters of silk organza dyed yellow and cut broadly in a circular shape", which emphasize the actress' movement. Dickens theorized that Disney opted for a simpler design to make the dress easier to replicate for costumes and merchandise.

Durran incorporated 18th-century fashion elements into the dress, namely its layered skirt and emphasized waistline. The costume required 12,000 hours to design and create, with 238 of those hours and 10 crewmembers devoted to making the dress. Multiple copies were made. The final costume is made of lightweight tulle, 180 feet of dyed satin organza, and taffeta, stitched together using 3,000 feet of thread. Although Watson wore a cage underneath certain areas of the skirt, several layers of organza contribute to most of its volume. Elements of the Beast's castle were incorporated into the design, specifically a gold rococo pattern borrowed from the ceiling. Durran recruited an English artist to transform the pattern's floral motif into a painted design, which was hand-painted onto a canvas before being enlarged and digitally printed onto the dress. Durran's team printed the artwork onto three layers of the skirt using gold leaf filigree in a pattern reminiscent of the ballroom's Rococo floor, on top of which they sewed 2,160 Swarovski crystals for additional sparkle. Overall, the design remained faithful to the original but, according to Fawnia Soo Hoo of Nylon, was updated to reflect Belle's liberated nature and allow her to lean into the final action scenes.

The gown's accessories also complement the characters' surroundings, namely Belle's plant-like ear cuff, feather-like hairpiece and gold filigree necklace. Durran explained that since everything worn in the castle is created in the castle, the accessories should also "partake in the magic enchantment of the castle itself", with Belle's ear cuff resembling a growing plant. Watson wears her hair in a "half-up, half-down" style reminiscent of the original, held in place using a gilded hair piece which is used to unlock a cart later in the film. Belle's shoes are 18th-century high heels hand-painted with golden glowers. Despite their height, the shoes are practical enough for Belle to wear while running. Watson has identified wearing the dress as her favorite moment in the film. Unlike previous adaptations, Watson's Belle does not re-wear the golden gown at the end of the film once the castle's spell is lifted. Instead, Durran designed an original white floral dress for Watson.

=== 2022 television special ===
Singer H.E.R. played Belle in Beauty and the Beast: A 30th Celebration, a 2022 television special commemorating the 30th anniversary of the film's Academy Award nomination for Best Picture. Costume designer Marina Toybina adapted Belle's ball gown for the special, which was the final costume she created for the program. Toybina debated whether she should design a live-action replica of the gown, or approach it from an entirely new direction. To help establish that H.E.R. was portraying her own version of the popular character for a modern audience, Toybina opted not to design an exact replica of the dress in favor of incorporating H.E.R.'s own musical style. Toybina wanted to use the rose motif in the gown's design, aiming to create a "yellow version of the rose". To achieve this effect, the designer specially draped the skirt in a manner intended to resemble rose petals, invoking a "softness and elegance" unique to the new design. Four different pleating techniques were used for the skirt's fullness, including sunburst pleating and gathered pleating. All embroidery was hand-beaded.

After debating with the production team on whether the dress should appear yellow or gold, the costumer designer ultimately decided on a hybrid of both, described as "an iridescent yellow fabric with golden detailing on the corset". Discussing the gown's hue which continues to be debated, Toybina explained that the dress was originally gold dress and evolved into a yellow dress over time. She also drew inspiration from contemporary fashion designers such as Alexander McQueen, Thierry Mugler, and Daniel Roseberry, while the armor-like bodice draws inspiration from Joan of Arc.

== Reception ==
When Beauty and the Beast was released in 1991, Belle's ball gown quickly became a favorite among Disney fans, and it has since become closely associated with the character. Alexis Bennett of Cosmopolitan called it "unforgettable". D23 contributor Beth Deitchman believes the dress "has remained equally enchanting since 1991", while Shea Simmons of Bustle called it "the star of the show". According to E!, the gown resembles a dress "straight off the Oscar de la Renta runway". Writing for Seventeen, Kelsey Stiegman called the dress "every little girl's prom dream". Both Hould-Ward and Durran's costume designs were nominated for industry awards in their respective fields of stage and film. Writer Genevieve Valentine believes the design is difficult to recreate both at the Disney Parks and in merchandise, observing that the dress had received at least half a dozen redesigns by 2017.

Durran's version of the dress divided critics and audiences, earning mixed reviews upon its debut in the film's 2017 live-action remake. Emmet Asher-Perrin of Tor.com felt "there's nothing wrong with the dress", describing it as functional and faithful to the original, but questioned its muted hue. Upon release of the remake's trailer, Penny Goldstone of Marie Claire complimented its details and silhouette. Brooke Bobb of Vogue described the costume as a "sun-colored cupcake frock" in which Watson "looks resplendent". While Dickens lauded the original dress as "a magnificent piece of fashion", she dismissed the remake as "a limp piece of margarine", particularly in comparison to costumes worn by the film's supporting characters and the gown worn by Lily James in Disney's 2015 live-action remake of Cinderella (1950). Valentine found Durran's design to be more concerned with Watson's brand than historical or aesthetical accuracy, opining that the garment's lack of visual impact "means they had something besides standout costuming in mind". Describing the dress as "a casualty of practicality", Valentine called it "a walking uncanny valley" in comparison to more imaginative costumes, particularly the Beast's. Farmers Harvest felt the costume "does not live up to its iconic" reputation, comparing it to a modern prom dress "as opposed to the royal French ball gown it is supposed to be", which they blamed on Watson's creative input. Jessica Mason of The Mary Sue described Watson's interpretation as a "monstrosity" and one of "the worst offenses in 'period' costuming".

Nevertheless, both Cosmopolitan and Wonderwall cited Watson's version among the most iconic dresses in film history, with the latter calling it an "amazing gown that looks like it was ripped from the pages of a fairy tale", while Vogue Paris hailed it as one of film's most iconic yellow dresses. The Guardian journalist Jess Cartner-Morley described Watson's dress as an improvement over the original, writing that it "retains pride of place on screen – albeit with the sickly, 90s shade of the original ... filtered into a softer mid-century yellow". Cartner-Morley also observed that the dress adheres to the revival of yellow as a trending formalwear color between 2016 and 2017, while Anne Cohen of Refinery29 said yellow dresses were experiencing a comeback. According to Fawnia Soo Hoo of Nylon, "no timeless yellow dress brings as much warm nostalgia as Belle's circa-18th-century-France ballgown".

== Legacy ==
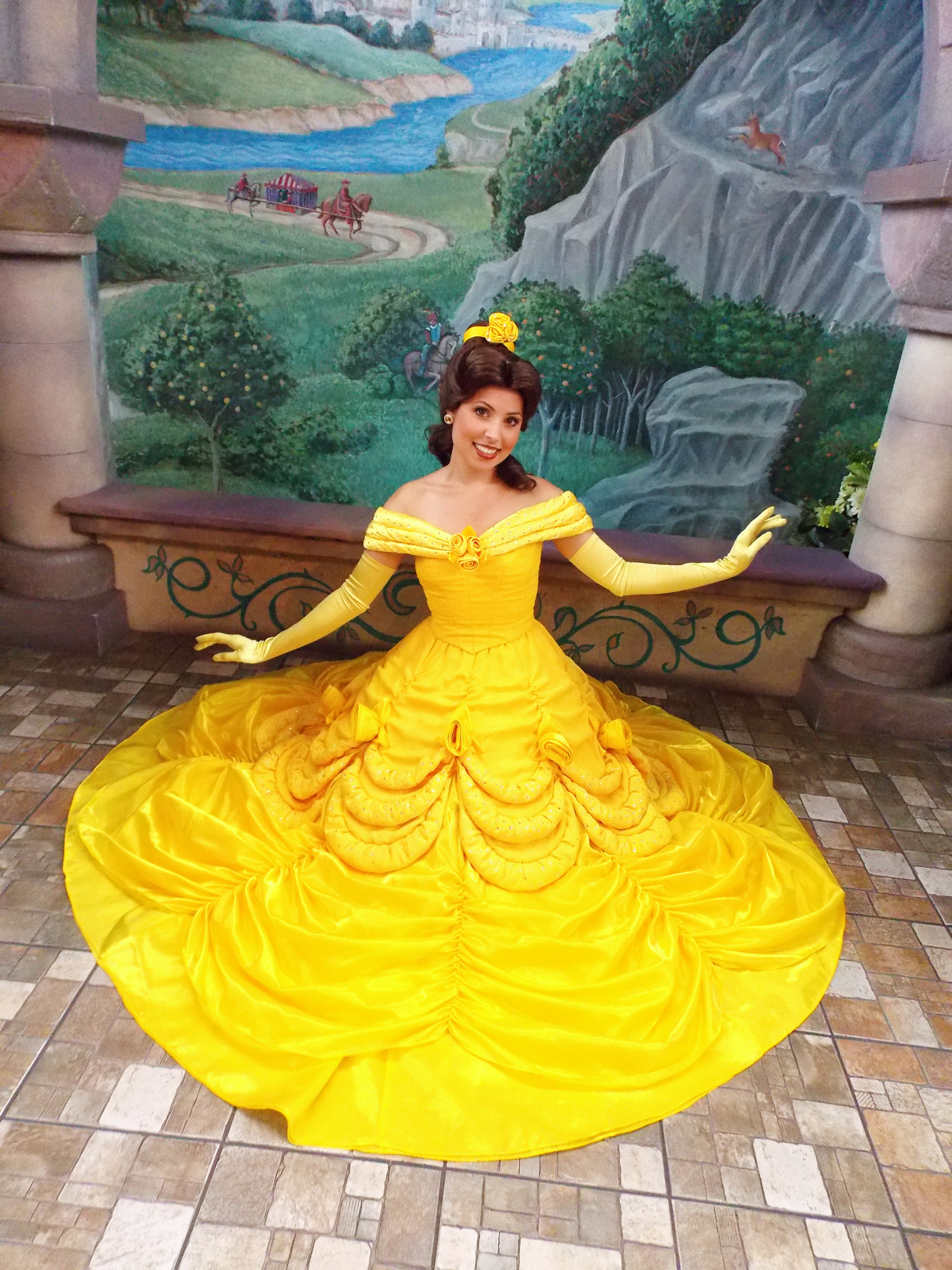
A Disney Parks cast member dressed as Belle.

Belle's ball gown is considered to be one of the most famous dresses in film history, as well as one of Disney's most recognizable dresses. Several media publications have referred to the dress as "iconic", with Clark Collis of Entertainment Weekly writing in 2016 that it "has become a genuinely iconic garment in the 25 years since the film's release". According to Floriane Reynaud of Vogue Paris, the dress "is one of the most iconic costumes in film history", comparing its impact to costumes from the films Gone With the Wind (1939) and Moulin Rouge! (2001). Penny Goldstone of Marie Claire agreed that the dress is Disney's most iconic princess gown, while Jo-Anne Rowney of the Daily Mirror called it "one of the most iconic dresses in Disney history". Sarah Karmali of British Vogue considers it to be both one of the studio's "most instantly recognisable dresses" and one of the 20 most famous dresses in fashion history.

In a 2018 ranking of "Pop culture's 15 most iconic yellow dresses", Entertainment Weekly contributor Mary Sollosi said the dress "has gone down in Disney history as one of [their] most iconic fairy-tale dresses". The Houston Chronicle mentioned the garment in a similar ranking of famous yellow dresses, with author Kyrie O’Connor writing, "Whether you're Belle or Beyonce, wearing a yellow dress sends the message that the wearer is confident and doesn't worry about getting noticed". Niamh Campbell of Evoke.ie believes the dress alone is beloved enough to convince people to watch the live-action remake in theaters. According to Screen Rant's Sierra Robinson, the garment "is a huge reason as to why the [animated] film is so loved", ranking it the fifth "most iconic" movie dress. Writing for the same publication, Rotem Rusak ranked it the second-best Disney princess gown, describing it as an "incredible" dress that made Disney history, while Bethany Aroutunian ranked it third on the website's list of "Best Outfits In Disney Live-Action Adaptations".

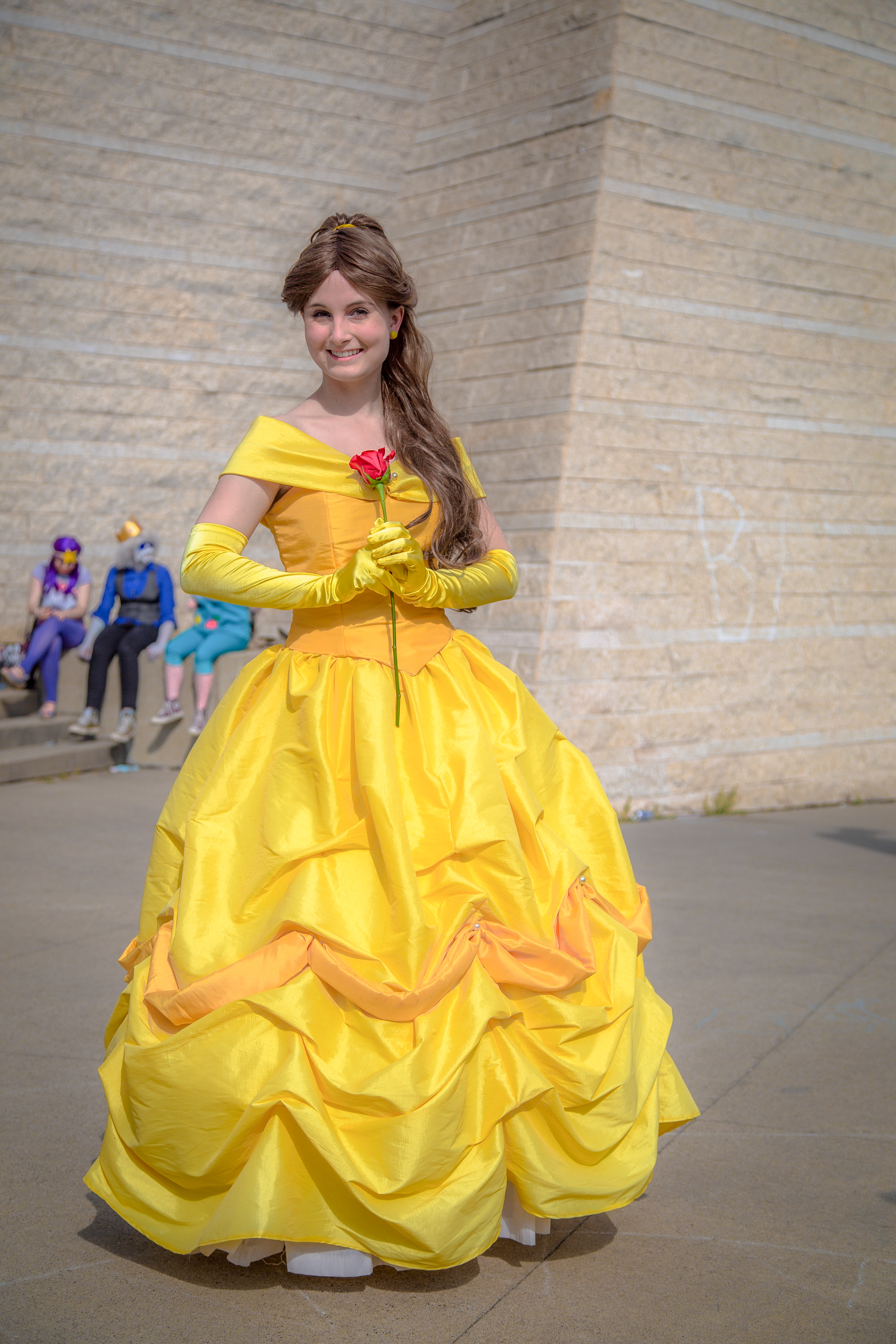
Belle's dress has been worn as a Halloween costume and at cosplay events.

According to Fawnia Soo Hoo of Fashionista, the gown remains the film's most recognizable look, having been immortalized in the forms of dolls, Halloween costumes, and merchandise. The dress continues to be a popular Halloween costume among young girls, surpassed only by Elsa's ice dress from Frozen in terms of Disneyland purchases as of 2021. According to Bobb, "little girls everywhere have dreamed of twirling around in that dress" since 1991, describing it as arguably "the single most recognizable image from the original film". The gown is believed to have inspired red carpet dresses worn by several celebrities, including Cheryl, Alicia Vikander, Leslie Mann and Katie Holmes, as well as fashion designer Giambattista Valli's Haute Couture fashion show. Vikander admitted that the yellow Louis Vuitton dress she wore to the 88th Academy Awards in 2016 was deliberately inspired by Belle, who she had idolized as a child. In 2017, Olivia Bahou of InStyle observed that the dress's "appeal is spilling over from the screen to the fashion world, and the proof is on the red carpet ... with everyone [in Hollywood] channeling the Disney princess". Bahou called the gown "the original celebrity stylist", while Emma Firth of Grazia coined the dress's influence on fashion trends the "Belle-effect". Actress Penélope Cruz wore a rendition of Belle's dress for photographer Annie Leibovitz's Disney Dream Portraits series in 2011. Actress Hailee Steinfeld wore a Belle costume during a musical performance at the 2017 MTV Movie & TV Awards. An interpretation of the dress, designed by Eduardo Castro, appears in the television series Once Upon a Time. It is worn by actress Emilie de Ravin, who plays an alternate live-action version of Belle. Costume designer Bea Åkerlund identified the dress as their favorite "yellow fashion moment".

Screen Rant contributor Lucy-Jo Finnighan believes the dress "is probably one of the reasons why this film is considered the best on-screen adaptation of Beauty and the Beast". The version of the costume Braxton wore on Broadway was displayed during the Treasures of the Walt Disney Archives exhibit at the Ronald Reagan Presidential Museum and Library in 2012. To commemorate the release of the remake, Belle's gown was exhibited at the El Capitan Theatre in March 2017. In 2019, Watson's costume was displayed at the Walt Disney Archives' "Heroes and Villains: The Art of the Disney Costume" exhibit at the D23 Expo. The dress and its exhibit were moved to the Museum of Pop Culture in 2021, following delays as a result of the COVID-19 pandemic.

== See also ==
- List of individual dresses
- Belle (Beauty and the Beast)
- Beauty and the Beast (1991 film)
- Beauty and the Beast (musical)
- Beauty and the Beast (2017 film)
