= Pseudo-feminism =

Act of co-opting feminist rhetoric and ideologies

Pseudo-feminism, also known as fake feminism or feminism appropriation, refers to the act of co-opting feminist rhetoric and ideologies for purposes that contradict or undermine the goals of feminism. It involves using the language and imagery of feminism to promote ideologies, products, or actions that reinforce traditional gender roles, objectification, or oppression of women.

Pseudo-feminism is often criticized as a form of purplewashing, where corporations or organizations try to market themselves as supportive of women's rights and feminist values while engaging in practices that harm or exclude women. It can also manifest as individuals or groups claiming to be feminists while promoting misogynistic, anti-feminist, or regressive views.

Critics argue that pseudo-feminism can be damaging as it co-opts and dilutes the meaning of feminism, undermining the efforts of genuine feminist movements. It is seen as a form of cultural appropriation, exploiting feminist discourse for personal gain or commercial interests without understanding or commitment to the underlying principles.

== Impact ==
In the pursuit of gender equality and justice, the concept of feminism has played a pivotal role in shaping society. However, a distorted version of feminism, known as pseudo-feminism, has emerged and begun to tarnish its reputation. Pseudo-feminism refers to the misuse of feminist principles and laws, often resulting in false accusations and harm to innocent individuals.

One of the most significant impacts of pseudo-feminism is the misuse of rights and laws intended for the protection of women. This can lead to false accusations of sexual harassment, assault, and other forms of abuse. These false claims can have severe consequences for the accused, including damage to their reputation, mental health, and even suicide, Just like Manav Singh case.

False accusations can also create a skewed perception of reality, as they may lead to increased mistrust and hostility between men and women. This imbalance in gender relations can hinder the progress of genuine feminist causes, as the focus shifts from equality to personal grudges and ego.

Moreover, pseudo-feminism can undermine the credibility of actual cases of abuse, making it difficult for victims to receive the support and justice they deserve. The constant fear of false accusations can also create a sense of reluctance among men to engage in normal interactions with women, further straining relationships.
