= Hijabophobia =

Fear or hatred against Muslim women who wear hijab

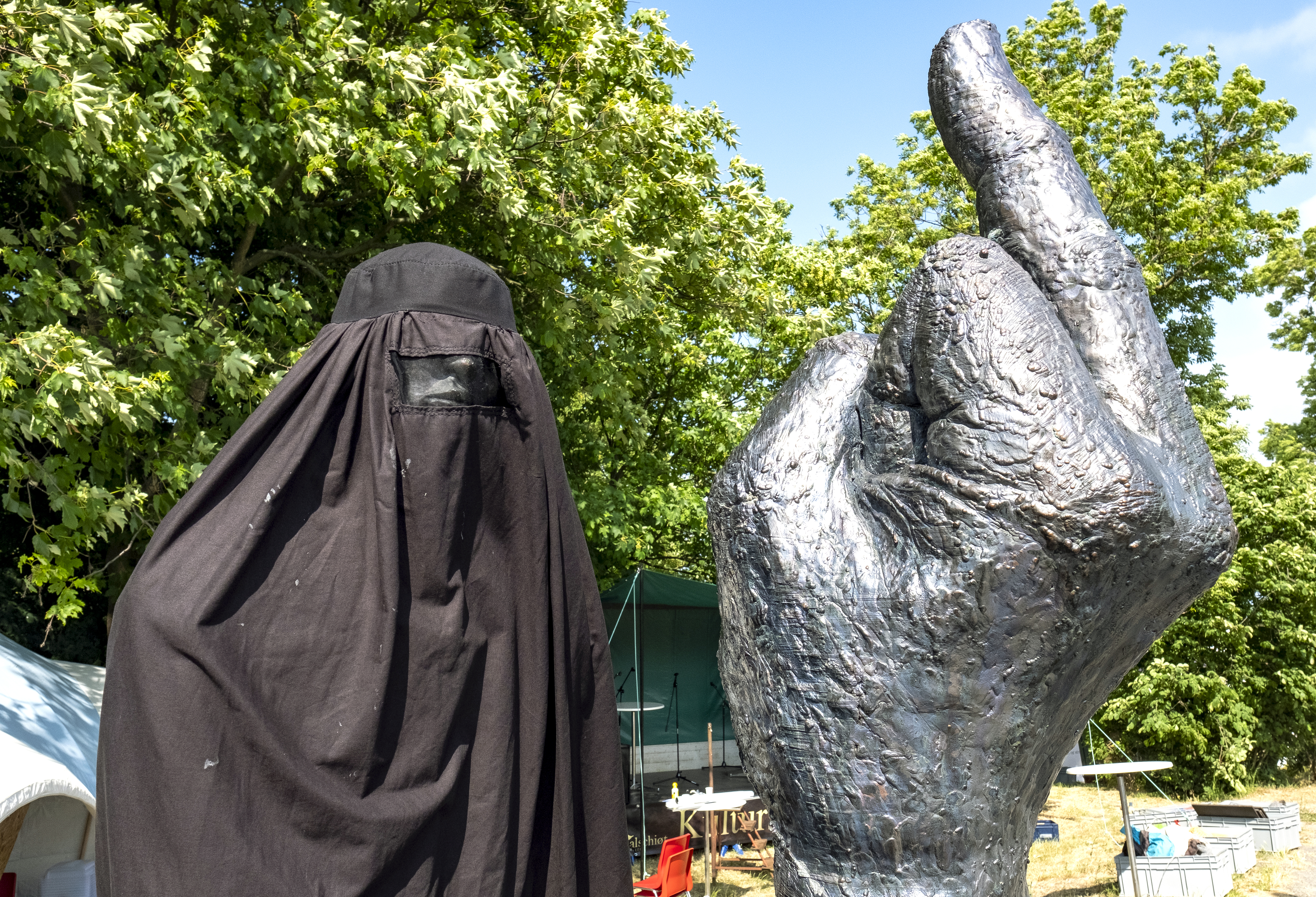
Anti-hijab installation at a park in Malmö.

Hijabophobia is a type of religious and cultural discrimination against Muslim women who wear the hijab. The discrimination has had manifestations in public, working, and educational places.

== Analysis ==
Hijabophobia is a term referring to discrimination against women wearing Islamic veils, including the hijab, chador, niqāb, and burqa. It is considered a gender-specific type of Islamophobia or simply "hostility towards the hijab". The term is applied to discourse based in colonial representations of Muslim women as victims oppressed by misogynistic in academic circles.

According to The Gazette, hijabophobia began as a French national phenomenon, citing the 1989 headscarf affair (French: l'affaire du foulard). In France, according to Ayhan Kaya, Islamophobia is mixed with hijabophobia. In a 2012 paper, Hamzeh posits that "hijabophobia" encapsulates the sexist aspects of Islamophobia, in which Muslim women bear the brunt of anti-Muslim attacks.Other studies referred to the way that the Islamophobia is laced with hijabophobia, creating a scapegoating system in which Muslim women are stigmatized for using a hypervisible Islamic symbol. The practice of Hijab is also viewed as a submission to the patriarchal discourse that US media and Western communities stoke it as a part of the religion of Islam. Overall, such veils supposedly "interfere with the culture of Western communities as being symbols of extremism, backwardness, and oppression."

Political scientist Vincent Geisser argues that hijabophobia became more widespread after the September 11 attacks, as evidenced by the number of laws regulating and restricting the hijab in public places and governmental offices. A study found that Muslim girls in London perceived discrimination when wearing the hijab outside their immediate communities, and felt social pressure to not wear the hijab. In addition, according to the ACLU, 69% of women who wore the hijab reported at least one incident of discrimination, compared to 29% of women who did not wear the hijab.

== Manifestations ==
=== Workplaces ===
==== European Court of Justice ====
On 14 March 2017, (Note: The court verdict: "the prohibition on wearing an Islamic headscarf, which arises from an internal rule of a private undertaking prohibiting the visible wearing of any political, philosophical or religious sign in the workplace, does not constitute direct discrimination based on religion or belief within the meaning of that directive.") a ruling by European Union's top law court, the European Court of Justice, allowed employers "to ban staff from wearing visible religious symbols" including the hijab. The decision was criticized for disguising what Muslims described as "a direct attack on women wearing hijabs at work." As a result, by 2017, two women from France and Belgium were dismissed from work since they refused to remove their hijabs. Samira Achbita, a woman from Belgium, was dismissed from working in her company G4S as a result of the court ruling. OpenDemocracy argued that the court ruling was a normalization of hijabophobia, as it did not challenge the assertion that an employee wearing a hijab can conflict with a company’s desire to project an image of neutrality.

=== Public places ===
There are instances where Muslim dress have been banned in public spaces. The burqa was banned by local laws in Spain in 2010, though these laws began to be overturned by the Spanish Supreme Court in 2013. Similarly, in 2016, France's Council of State began to overrule a ban on the burkini by over thirty French municipalities as Islamophobic. In 2018, Austria banned full-face coverings in order to limit the visibility of orthodox Islam. This was criticized by police who were put in the position of charging people for wearing smog and ski masks. France and Belgium have enacted a similar ban since 2011. In 2015, a partial ban was introduced in the Netherlands, and the German parliament banned face coverings while driving in September 2017. Hijabophobia also influences the hospitality industry in Malaysia. Hotels believe employees that wear the headdress appear less professional, therefore causing islamophobic policies to be implemented. On February 16, 2021, The National Assembly of France voted in favor of an “anti-separatism” bill that aims to reinforce the secular system in France by banning the wearing of hijabs for women under 18 while in public. In response, #handsoffmyhijab was spread across social media platforms.

=== Schools ===
In 1994, the French Ministry for Education sent out recommendations to teachers and headmasters to ban Islamic veiling in educational institutions. According to a 2019 study by the Institute of Labor Economics, more girls with a Muslim background born after 1980 graduated from high school after the ban was introduced.

In October 2018, Austria banned headscarves for children in kindergarten. The ban was motivated by protecting children from family pressure to wear the headscarf. According to an Austrian teachers' union, a ban for pupils aged up to 14 years should be considered, as that is the religious legal age (German: religionsmündig).

In Quebec, public servants, including teachers, are banned from wearing religious garments, such as a kippa, hijab, or turban at work.

In January 2022, a number of colleges in South-Indian state of Karnataka stopped female students wearing a hijab from entering the campus. The issue has since then snow-balled into a major political controversy in India. The Hindu nationalist Bharatiya Janata Party (which began the controversy) supports the ban, stating that enforcing Hindus and other religious groups to adhere to Western attire in the name of proper conduct while allowing Muslims to wear religious clothing is tantamount to institutionalized Muslim appeasement. On 15 March 2022, through a highly controversial verdict, the Karnataka High Court upheld the hijab ban in educational institutions as a reasonable restriction of fundamental rights.

=== Brands ===
In 2019, Decathlon, a French sportswear brand, made the decision to not sell hijab sportswear in France, following opposition to the clothing line from figures such as health minister Agnes Buzyn, who voiced her distaste for the garment on a radio show.

=== Sports ===
Hijabophobia has led female athletes to be ineligible in sporting events due to wearing a hijab. One example is FIFA's "hijab ban" crisis after the organization banned head coverings from 2011 to 2014. The Iranian women's national soccer team was disqualified from the 2012 Olympics because the players wore hijabs. During the 2024 Summer Olympics, French athletes were barred from wearing hijabs, with one player having to wear a cap in order to participate in the opening ceremony. Another example is unravelling in the French soccer league, as it is the only international body to exclude hijab-wearing women from practising the sport.

== See also ==
- Gendered Islamophobia
- Islamic scarf controversy in France
- Hijab § Legal bans
- Kashf-e hijab
