= Brigitte Vasallo =

Spanish feminist writer and activist (born 1973)

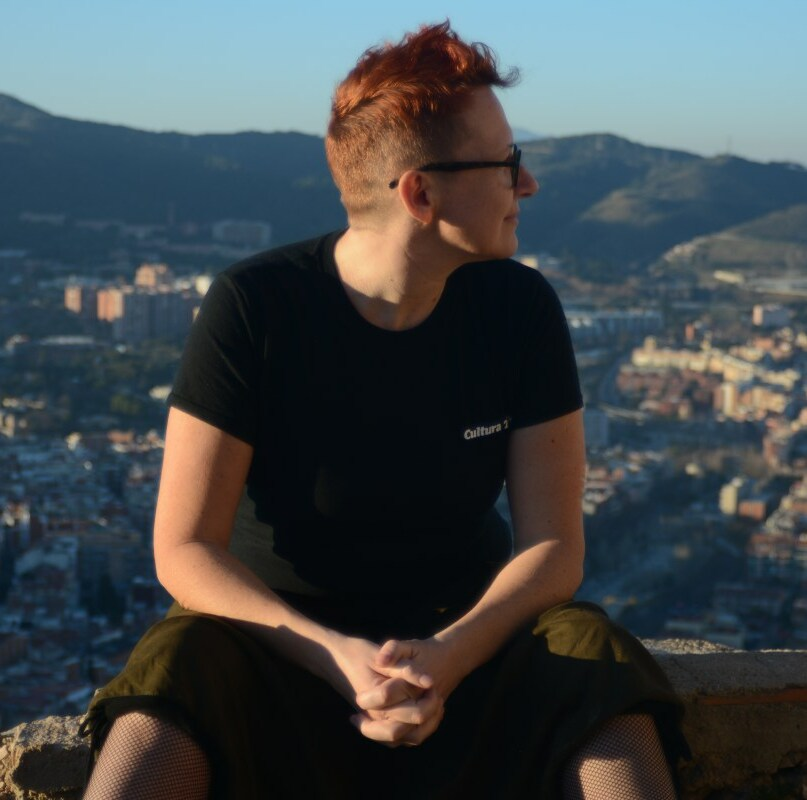
- Born: 1973 (age 52–53); Barcelona
- Occupations: Writer and activist
- Notable work: Pornoburka (2013)

Brigitte Vasallo (born 1973 in Spain) is a Spanish writer and antiracist, feminist and LGBTI activist, specially known for her critique of gendered Islamophobia, purplewashing and homonationalism, as well as for the defence of polyamory in affective relationships.

== Biography ==
Daughter of a Galician family that migrated to France and then to Catalonia, which excludes her from the meaning of the term xarnego, although she has tried to appropriate it as part of her own identity. She has spent most of her adult life in Morocco, which has allowed her to acquire a perspective of the ethnocentric and colonial hegemonic thinking of Western society.

She collaborates regularly with various media, such as eldiario.es, Catalunya Ràdio, Diagonal, La Directa or Pikara Magazine, in addition to giving numerous lectures. Likewise, she is a lecturer in the Master of Gender and Communication at the Autonomous University of Barcelona.

== Work ==
Vasallo's work is structured around two main axes. On the one hand, she analyzes intersectionality between racism and misogyny, particularly on how it affects Muslim women. In this sense, she denounces purplewashing and pinkwashing, or in other words, how feminism and LGBTI rights are instrumentalized to justify xenophobia, ceasing to be ends in themselves.

On the other hand, she values other ways of relating, apart from the traditional monogamy, overcoming fidelity as a mode of possession and love as a limited good. However, she also warns of how polyamory can be appropriated by neoliberalism from an individualistic perspective, reproducing the inherited power structures and objectifying people and their bodies as another consumable commodity.

=== Books ===
- Pornoburka: desventuras del Raval y otras f(r)icciones contemporáneas (2013).
- Pensamiento monógamo. Terror poliamoroso (2018).
  - Translated into English as Monogamous Mind, Polyamorous Terror (2024).
- Mentes insanas. Ungüentos feministas para males cotidianos (2020).
- Lenguaje inclusivo y exclusión de clase (2021).
