= Gender roles in Islam =

Role of men and women in Islamic culture

Gender roles in Islam are based on scriptures, cultural traditions, and jurisprudence.

The Quran, the holy book of Islam, indicates that both men and women are spiritually equal. The Quran states:

"Those who do good, whether male or female, and have faith will enter Paradise and will never be wronged; even as much as the speck on a date stone."

— Quran 4:124

However, this notion of equality has not been reflected in several laws in Muslim-based institutions.

The Quran does not specify gender roles for women, but Islamic practice does. This is partially because men and women are at times allotted different rights and cultural expectations. Hadith Sahih Bukhari (9:89:252) states that a man is expected to be the "guardian of [his] family," whereas a woman is expected to be the "guardian of her husband's home and his children."

In some Muslim-based countries, women are legally restricted from practicing certain rights.

== Traditional gender roles ==
Cultural traditions often impact gender roles, prevailing cultural norms, and the interpretation of the Quran and other Islamic texts.

=== Family ===
Some reformist and feminist scholars argue that the concept of guardianship has formed the basis of particular gender roles in Muslim societies. Women are often expected to be obedient wives and mothers, staying within the familial environment. Meanwhile, men are expected to be the protectors and caretakers of their families. However, the majority of Muslim scholars agree that women are not obligated to serve their husbands, do housework, or do any kind of work at home. According to Egypt's Dar-al-Ifta, it is regarded as permissible for a woman to go out for work if she has the consent of her husband. If there is no mutual consent, then it is not permissible for her to go out and work. Until the period of the rise of Islam, there were many ideas of certain actions and behaviors of women that should be expected that were considered traditional gender roles. Women were seen as inferior to men, and women were supposed to behave and respect men. In earlier times, women were seen as the housekeepers and relied on their husbands to protect them since they were thought to be not strong enough to take care of themselves.

According to Sayyid Qutb, a prominent member of the Egyptian Muslim Brotherhood in the 1950s and 1960s, the Quran "gives the man the right of 'guardianship' or 'superiority' over the family structure to prevent dissension and friction between the spouses. The equity of this system lies in the fact that God both favored the man with the necessary qualities and skills for the 'guardianship' and also charged him with the duty to provide for the structure's upkeep." Qutb's ideologies are still impactful for radical Islamists today, influencing such prominent Middle Eastern leaders as Ayman Zawahiri and terrorists as Osama bin Laden.

In Islamic culture, the roles played by men and women are equally important. Gender roles viewed from an Islamic perspective are based on the Qur'an and emphasize the dynamic structure of the family. As in any socio-cultural group, gender roles vary depending on the conservative or liberal nature of the specific group.

Although there are no elaborate roles for men and women in the Qur'an, it is strongly implied that each gender provides equally significant contributions to the family realm.

Chapter 4, in verse 34, in the Qur'an, states that "men are the maintainers of women," because of the "wealth they have spent" on women and that believing women are "devoutly obedient" to their husbands and/or God and protect their faith ("al-ghayb") or the couple's house in husband's absence. Outside of this, there's very little explicit mention of specific gender roles in Qur'an despite difference in rulings regarding inheritance, polygamy, testimony in some cases, dowry and financial support to divorced women, especially when pregnant. Traditionally, it's accepted that a noble "husband's responsibilities commit him to support his wife and children, provide education for his offspring, be kind and attentive to his spouse, and be good to his affine". These values have remained rather consistent throughout the history of Islam. It is culturally understood that women do, and should, rely on men. This is viewed not as a restricting reliance, but as an arrangement to protect women from the distress and inconveniences of the public arenas. It is because of this ideology that women traditionally do not contribute to the household financially, leaving men to be the sole breadwinners.

The woman's role in the home, although different from that of men, is also of great value and importance in Islamic culture. In earlier times, from a very young age, girls traditionally grew up in the women's quarters of the house called the harem. The harem was that part of the house where the female members of the family and household lived. It was normally out of bounds to all males except the master of the house, his sons and perhaps a physician. Here, young girls were familiarized with domestic activities and were taught Islamic laws and values.

=== Femininity ===
What is deemed feminine, and the "ideal" Muslim woman, is constantly changing. These changes are influenced by many things, including the global market and modernization. The Quran requires Muslim men and women to dress modestly. The law of the hijab states that the whole female body aside from the face and hands should be covered when a woman leaves her home as a sign of modesty, obedience to God and respect for Islamic values. Modernization has changed many aspects of femininity, in the past, and in the present. The global market is changing femininity by showcasing and promoting images that are desirable for an ideal Muslim woman, and this change has caused certain traditions for women to become outdated and contested. One tradition that is becoming less accepted is the veil; some women, though not all, now see this as degrading in today's world whereas in the past it was seen as a sign of respect. Regardless of traditions, women have been used throughout history as a cultural symbol of Muslim religious values, which has shaped what it means to be feminine in a society.

=== Clothing ===
Several passages of the Quran deal with acceptable dress standards for both men and women. Surah 24, Verses 30-31 states:

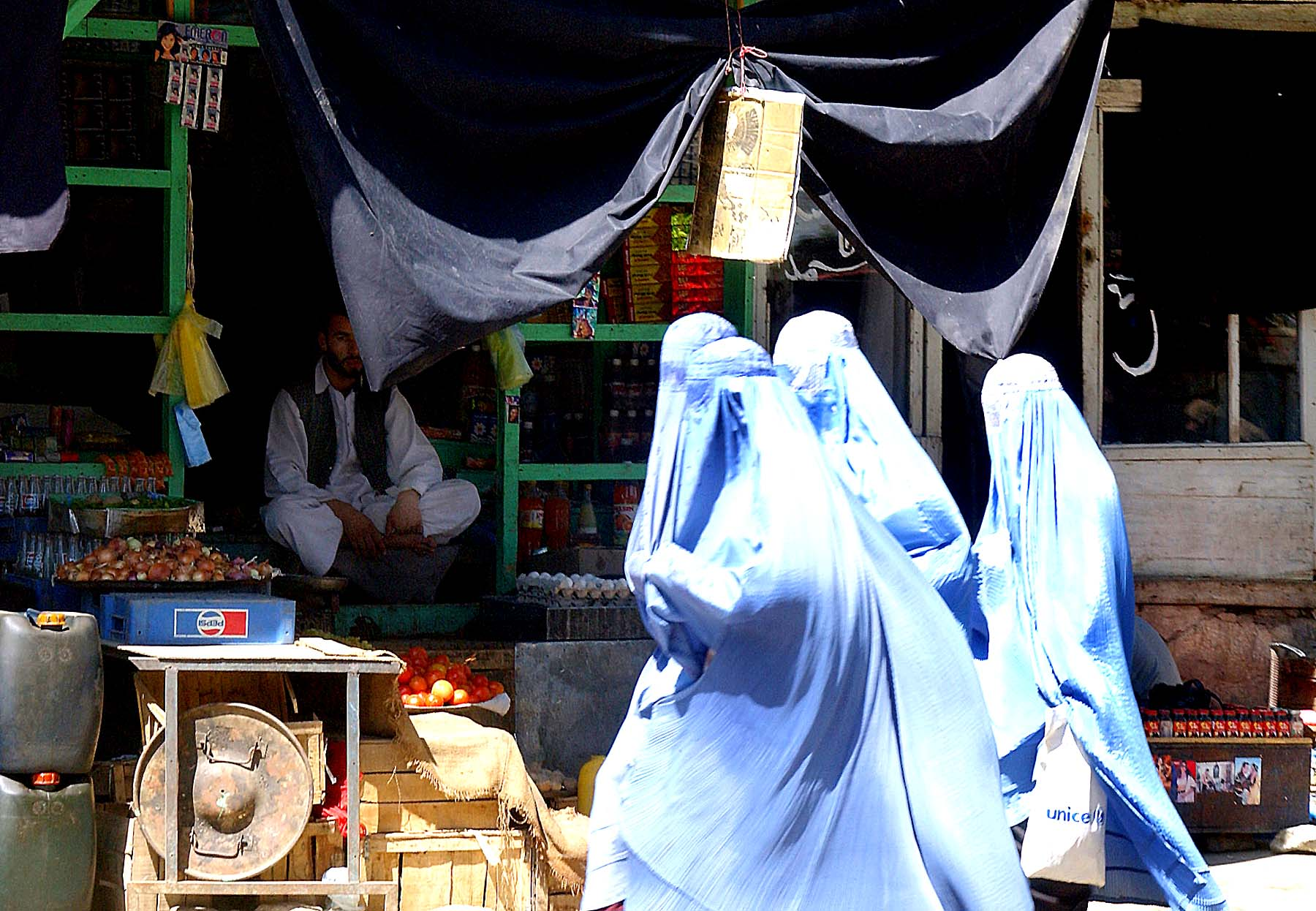
Women wearing burqas in Afghanistan

"And tell the believing men to lower their gaze and be modest. That is purer for them and tell the believing women to lower their gaze and be modest, and to display of their adornment only that which is apparent, and to draw their veils over their bosoms, and not to reveal their adornment save to [those relatives who fall within bounds of close relationship explained in the Qur’an (i.e. the Mahrams)]..."

In Iran, breaking the Islamic dress code or participation in perceived cross dressing is a crime resulting in imprisonment.

=== Prayer and worship ===
For Friday prayers, by custom, Muslim's congregations segregate men, women, and children into separate groups. Men are expected to offer the five daily prayers at the nearest mosque. Muhammad specifically allowed Muslim women to attend mosques and pray behind men. Muhammad said, "Do not prevent your wife(s) from going to the mosque, even though their houses are better for them," implying women are recommended to stay at home. "A woman’s prayer in her house is better than her prayer in her courtyard, and her prayer in her bedroom is better than her prayer in her house." (Reported by Abu Dawud in al-Sunan, Baab maa jaa’a fee khurooj al-nisaa’ ilaa’l-masjid. See also Saheeh al-Jaami‘, no. 3833).

== Controversial practices ==
=== Female genital mutilation (FGM) ===
Surveys have shown a belief in a small minority of Muslim nations, particularly in Mali, Mauritania, Guinea, and Egypt, that FGM is a religious requirement. Gruenbaum has argued that practitioners may not distinguish between religion, tradition, and chastity, making it difficult to interpret the data. FGM's origins in northeastern Africa are pre-Islamic, but the practice became associated with Islam because of that religion's focus on female chastity and seclusion. (Note: Gerry Mackie, 1996: "FGM is pre-Islamic but was exaggerated by its intersection with the Islamic modesty code of family honor, female purity, virginity, chastity, fidelity, and seclusion.") There is no mention of it in the Quran. It is praised in a few daʻīf (weak) hadith (sayings attributed to Muhammad) as noble but not required, (Note: Gerry Mackie, 1996: "The Koran is silent on FGM, but several hadith (sayings attributed to Mohammed) recommend attenuating the practice for the woman's sake, praise it as noble but not commanded, or advise that female converts refrain from mutilation because even if pleasing to the husband it is painful to the wife.") although it is regarded as obligatory by the Shafi'i version of Sunni Islam. In 2007 the Al-Azhar Supreme Council of Islamic Research in Cairo ruled that FGM had "no basis in core Islamic law or any of its partial provisions".

== Modern viewpoints ==
Viewpoints regarding gender roles vary with different interpretations of the Quran, different sects of the religion, and different cultural traditions and geographical locations.

=== Salafaism ===
Salafiyyah, the Arabic term for "Salafism", is defined as "that which pertains to ancestry". It was first conceived by Muhammad Abduh, referring to the first generations of the early Muslims who supported Muhammad during the seventh century.

The ideas of Abdul Aziz bin Abdullah bin Baz are characteristic of much of the salafiyyah sect. Bin Baz believed that the engagement of women in "male domains" separates them from their God-given nature, eventually leading to women's misery and demise. He believed that women entering "male domains" posed a danger to Muslim society, eventually causing it to fall into moral decay. Additionally, he asserted that a woman outside the home was a woman denying her true, God-given character. He viewed the involvement of women in male domains as a detriment to the next generation, which he says may receive a worse education and less compassion from their mothers. Bin Baz also thought that women should only work in certain fields, those that are within a woman's domain, such as female education, nursing, and medical care. But even these must obey a strict separation of gender.

=== Wasatiyyah ===
The Qur'anic and prophetic terms for "moderation" are reflected in the word "wasatiyyah," which means the "middle way between extremes" and "upright without losing balance."

Muhammad Al-Ghazali's ideas characterize much of the wasatiyyah school of thought. His ideas are shared by other notable and influential people including Yusuf Al-Qaradawi, Abdel-Haleem AbuShaqua, and Hasan al-Turabi. Together they represent a growing modernist trend. Al-Ghazali indicated that Islam suggests a significant sense of equality between men and women. He maintained that there are traditions created by people and not by God that slow women's development and keeps them in religious ignorance, which he believes results in the degradation of the whole Muslim community. Ghazali asserts that women have been denied a say in their communities and have been restricted to domestic service. He also called for a change in Islamic thinking in general and the re-evaluation of cultural traditions that are attributed wrongly as central to the Islamic faith.

==== Fatema Mernissi ====
In her writings, Fatema Mernissi said that "if women's rights are a problem for some modern Muslim men, it is neither because of the Qur'an nor the Prophet Muhammad, nor the Islamic tradition, but simply because those rights conflict with the interests of a male elite". She questions the social norm that a man is dishonored if a woman in their family works outside of domestic space. She asserts that in the male mind, society is divided into an economically productive section that is public and male and, a domestic sphere that is private and female, and that these two areas should not mix.

==== Heba Ra'uf ====
Heba Ra'uf (born 1965) stresses the importance of new interpretations of the Quran and Sunnah (traditions and sayings of Muhammad). Ra'uf argues that the advancement of women's causes in Arab and Muslim societies requires a reworking of Islamic thought. She criticizes the efforts of those who draw their inspiration exclusively from Western feminism. On the other hand, some feminists like Nawal El-Saadawi severely criticize the veil: "veiling and nakedness are two sides of the same coin. Both mean women are bodies without mind...". But Ra'uf sees wearing a veil as a means of liberation: "the veil neutralizes women's sexuality in the public sphere, making clear that they are citizens – not sexual objects".

Ra'uf acknowledges that women belong in the public sphere, and she challenges any gender-based separation between the public and private spheres. She has asserted that "breaking the dichotomy would give housewives more social esteem and would encourage working women to fulfill their psychological need to be good mothers and wives," emphasizing that women's work should extend both into the private and the public sectors.

== Countries ==
=== Saudi Arabia ===
As of June 2018, women are allowed to drive in Saudi Arabia. They were the only country in the world which banned woman from driving. In some areas, such as Mecca, they are expected to cover their hair as well. While they have gained increased access to education and a few gender-segregated job opportunities, their representation in the labor market has increased from just over 10 percent in 2002 to 33 percent in 2021.

Women's development in Saudi Arabia has been relatively slower than in its neighboring Arab countries, especially regarding the improvement of female participation. In 2004, the fifth Jeddah Economic Forum held in Saudi Arabia had its first ever woman in key activities, with Lubna Olayan delivering the keynote speech.

=== Iran ===
The Islamic Republic of Iran has witnessed several advancements and setbacks for women's roles in the past 40 years, especially following the Iranian Revolution in 1979. After the revolution, Iranian women had more opportunities in some areas and more restrictions in others. One of the striking features of the revolution was the large-scale participation of women from traditional backgrounds in demonstrations leading up to the overthrow of the monarchy. The culture of education for women was established by the time of the revolution so that even after the revolution, large numbers of women entered civil service and higher education, After the 1989 Iranian constitutional referendum, changes resulted in an improvement in the lives and opportunities of women. Since then, several women have been elected to the Iranian parliament and more women participate in civil service. This is partially due to women taking advantage of higher educational opportunities. Iranian female education went from a 46 percent literacy rate, to 83 percent. Iran ranked 10th in terms of female literacy in the 1970s, and still holds this position. The Hijab became compulsory as well as modesty requirements; loose-fitting clothing as well as a Rusari (headscarf) that covers all the hair. On the economic front, Women's labor force participation rate and literacy rate have been on the rise. Yet the unemployment rate for women compared to that of men is still considerably higher.

=== Afghanistan ===
In the Afghanistan, women's rights have oscillated back and forth depending on the time period. After the fall of Kabul in 2021 during the Taliban insurgency and subsequent takeover of Afghanistan by the Taliban, concern about the future of women in the country increased. For the past 18 years, there were improvements in girls' education in which 4 out of 10 children were girls, according to a report by UNESCO. Due to the pressure from United Nations and International Organizations, Talibans were forced to allow women for education including under-graduate and post-graduate.

Apart from the education rights, the Women's Ministry was also replaced by the Ministry of Vice and Virtue. These groups of Islamic religious police were considered very harsh and even beat women if they were spotted without male guardians or dressed immodestly.

== See also ==
- Gendered Islamophobia
- Islamic clothing
- Islam and domestic violence
- Islamic Feminism
- Status of women's testimony in Islam
