= Disney Dream Portrait Series =

Series of portraits released between 2007 and 2014

From 2007 to 2014, Disney released a series of advertisements created by photographer Annie Leibovitz, and featured celebrities in Disney fairy tale scenes to promote Disney Parks' Year of a Million Dreams celebration.

== Portraits ==
Year	Scene	Title	Character(s)	Ref
2007	Alice in Wonderland	Where Wonderland is your destiny	Beyoncé Knowles as Alice; Lyle Lovett as the March Hare; Oliver Platt as The Mad Hatter	
2007	Sleeping Beauty	Where imagination saves the day	David Beckham as Prince Phillip	
2007	Cinderella	Where every Cinderella story comes true	Scarlett Johansson as Cinderella	
2007	Pinocchio and Disney Fairies	Where the magic begins	Abigail Breslin as Fira; Julie Andrews as The Blue Fairy	
2007	Snow White	Where you're the fairest of them all	Rachel Weisz as Snow White	
2007	The Sword in the Stone	Where you're always the king of the court	Roger Federer as King Arthur	
2008	Aladdin	Where a whole new world awaits	Jennifer Lopez as Princess Jasmine; Marc Anthony as Aladdin	
2008	Pocahontas	Where dreams run free	Jessica Biel as Pocahontas	
2008	Peter Pan	Where you never have to grow up	Gisele Bündchen as Wendy; Mikhail Baryshnikov as Peter Pan; Tina Fey as Tinker Bell	
2008	Aladdin	Where your every wish is our command	Whoopi Goldberg as Genie	
2008	The Little Mermaid	Where another world is just a wish away	Julianne Moore as Ariel; Michael Phelps as a merman	
2009	Sleeping Beauty	Where true love can be celebrated	Vanessa Hudgens as Princess Aurora; Zac Efron as Prince Phillip	
2011	Snow White	Where magic speaks, even when you’re not the fairest of them all	Alec Baldwin as the Magic Mirror; Olivia Wilde as the Evil Queen	
2011	Beauty and the Beast	Where a moment of beauty lasts forever	Jeff Bridges as the Beast; Penélope Cruz as Belle	
2011	The Little Mermaid	Where memories take hold and never let go	Queen Latifah as Ursula	
2011	Pirates of the Caribbean	Where magic sets sail...	Johnny Depp as Jack Sparrow	
2011	Pirates of the Caribbean	...and adventures become legendary	Johnny Depp as Jack Sparrow; Patti Smith as Second Pirate in Command	
2012	Haunted Mansion	Where wickedly good times await	None	
2012	Haunted Mansion	Where you can go on the ride of your afterlife	Jack Black as Phineas; Jason Segel as Gus; Will Ferrell as Ezra	
2012	Peter Pan	Where every moment leaves you hungry for more	Russell Brand as Captain Hook	
2013	Tangled	Where a world of adventure awaits	Taylor Swift as Rapunzel	
2013	The Princess and the Frog	Where you always follow your heart	Jennifer Hudson as Tiana	
2014	Brave	Where your destiny awaits	Jessica Chastain as Merida	
