= Islamic tradition =

Islamic tradition may refer to:

- Ahl al-Hadith, an Islamic school of Sunni Islam
- Atharism, a school of theology in Sunni Islam
- Islamic mythology, the body of myths associated with Islam
- Islamic philosophy, philosophy that emerges from the Islamic tradition
- Islamic schools and branches
- Traditionalism (Islam Nusantara), a unique blend of Islam in Indonesia that involves local and ancient traditions

== See also ==
- Islamic culture, the cultural practices that developed among the various peoples living in the Islamic world
