= Western society =

Western society may refer to:

- Western civilization, a term used to refer to the civilizations of people of European origin and their descendants
- Western world, countries whose dominant culture is derived from European civilization, countries residing in Europe, and part of Oceania
