= Purplewashing =

Use of feminist aesthetics to promote organisations

The feminist symbol including a fist inside of the female sign, enclosed in the color purple, the color of feminism

Purplewashing is the use of feminist issues to mask discriminatory or harmful practices. It involves selectively promoting certain aspects of feminism to improve a company's or organization's image, while often neglecting or undermining these same issues in other contexts.

In the context of feminism, it is used to describe a variety of political and marketing strategies aimed at promoting countries, people, companies and other organizations through an appeal to gender equality. This marketing tactic has also been called femvertising, which was most discussed in Gillette Razor's #MeToo commercial aimed towards toxic masculinity.

== Synonyms ==
Femvertising is a combination of "feminism" and "advertising" which refers to marketing strategies which highlight feminist themes such as female empowerment, gender equality, challenging female stereotypes, representation, and gender issues.

== Marketing ==
Through marketing and political strategies that reinforce a commitment to gender equality, western countries use this as a method of image-cleaning. This marketing tactic has also been called, "Femvertising", which was most discussed in Gillette Razor's #MeToo commercial aimed towards toxic masculinity. In advertisements, women are often portrayed through gender stereotypes, the objectification of the female body and the little representation of women. The term "femvertising" gained popularity in 2014 after the iBlog magazine SheKnows defined it as advertising that uses female-centric talent, messaging, and visuals to uplift and inspire women and girls, specifically due to its ability to question traditional gender stereotypes tied to women in advertising. Through "femvertising" marketers are able to reach female consumers as they use female empowerment to advertise.

One of the most well known examples today is the Dove Campaign for Real Beauty, launched in 2004, which featured women of various ages and body types, as opposed to polished models. The campaign began a trend of companies incorporating body positivity messaging and "real people" casting into advertisements. However, the campaign has been criticized for retaining a focus on physical beauty, and from the perceived hypocrisy of Dove's parent company Unilever owning other brands (such as Axe, SlimFast and Glow & Lovely) marketed using ideas contradicting those of the campaign.

Social media is a way in which companies can further market to women. Social media platforms such as Instagram portray the usage of "femvertising". Ads on social media apps provide a means for brands to bolster products and strategize the marketable content that the users interact with. These advertisements are generated based on the users' activity, increasing interest and therefore the probability of purchases and interaction. Social media feed that relates to women will drive the trends within these apps. In 2016, the clothing company H&M launched a campaign titled "She's A Lady", featuring women of diverse appearances and empowering imagery, which was used on social media platforms. Such campaigns online display the influence of "femvertising" to invest in the interest of women.

== Political ==
Within the Spanish Army, there have been many legislative and formal changes to fight sexism. However, it has not altered the relationship between the patriarchy and militarism that remains today within the Spanish Army. The report of Centre Delas d'Estudis per la Pau analyzes the women in the Armed Force and how they are far from actually reaching the feminist milestone for equality in the areas of power. Through certain strategies, the Army has engaged in purplewashing and therefore instrumentalized women in order to create a false reality of equality and modernity in the Armed Forces.

== See also ==
- -washing
- Aestheticization of politics
- Astroturfing
- Brigitte Vasallo
- Commodity feminism
- Ethnocentrism
- Feminationalism
- Gendered Islamophobia
- Homonationalism
- Humanewashing
- Intersectionality
- Islamic feminism
- Pastel QAnon
- Postcolonialism
- Purple capitalism
