= Beauty and the Beast (franchise) =

Disney media franchise based on fairy tale by Jeanne-Marie Leprince de Beaumont

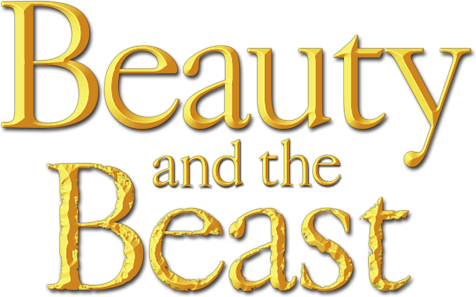
- The official promotional logo of the franchise, used since the 1991 original film.
- Created by: Walt Disney Animation Studios
- Original work: Beauty and the Beast (1991)
- Owner: The Walt Disney Company
- Years: 1991–present
- Based on: Beauty and the Beast by Gabrielle-Suzanne de Villeneuve

Films and television
- Films: Beauty and the Beast (1991; animated); Beauty and the Beast (2017; live-action)
- Television series: Sing Me a Story with Belle (1995–1997)
- Television special: Beauty and the Beast: A 30th Celebration
- Direct-to-video: Beauty and the Beast: The Enchanted Christmas (1997); Belle's Magical World (1998); Belle's Tales of Friendship (1999)

Theatrical presentations
- Musicals: Beauty and the Beast Live on Stage (1991); Beauty and the Beast (1994)

Games
- Video games: Beauty & The Beast: Belle's Quest (1993); Beauty & The Beast: Roar of the Beast (1993); Beauty and the Beast (1994; NES); Disney's Beauty and the Beast (1994; Super NES); Disney's Beauty and the Beast: A Board Game Adventure (1999); Disney's Beauty and the Beast Magical Ballroom (2000)

Audio
- Soundtracks: Beauty and the Beast: Original Motion Picture Soundtrack (1991); Beauty and the Beast: Original Motion Picture Soundtrack (2017)

Miscellaneous
- Theme park attractions: Beauty and the Beast Live on Stage (1991–present); Be Our Guest Restaurant (2012–present); Enchanted Tales with Belle (2012–present); Enchanted Tale of Beauty and the Beast (2020-present)
- Based on: Beauty and the Beast (1756) by Jeanne-Marie Leprince de Beaumont

Beauty and the Beast is a Disney media franchise comprising a film series and additional merchandise. The success of the original 1991 American animated feature, Beauty and the Beast, directed by Gary Trousdale and Kirk Wise, led to three direct-to-video follow-up films, a live-action spin-off television series, a Disney World stage show, a Disney World restaurant, a trackless dark ride, several video games, merchandise, and the 10th longest-running musical in Broadway history, which was nominated for nine Tony Awards, winning for Best Costume Design. In March 2017, Disney released a live-action remake of the film.

Belle is also a character used on Disney Consumer Products' Disney Princess franchise, while Gaston and LeFou are part of the Disney Villains franchise.

== Titles ==
=== Animated feature films ===
The 1991 animated film Beauty and the Beast is the original film of the franchise. It was directed by Gary Trousdale and Kirk Wise and produced by Walt Disney Feature Animation. Beauty and the Beast belongs to an era known as the Disney Renaissance. The plot of the film is based on the fairy tale Beauty and the Beast by Jeanne-Marie Le Prince de Beaumont. In 2002, Beauty and the Beast was selected for preservation in the National Film Registry by the Library of Congress for being "culturally, historically, or aesthetically significant".

Beauty and the Beast: The Enchanted Christmas is the first direct-to-video installment of the film series and served as a holiday special. It was directed by Andrew Knight, and released on November 11, 1997. Most of the film takes place in a flashback to a few weeks after the Beast saved Belle from the wolves but the beginning and the end take place one year after the events of the first film.

Belle's Magical World is the second direct-to-video installment of the film series. It was directed by Cullen Blaine, Daniel de la Vega, Barbara Dourmashkin, Dale Kase, Bob Kline, Burt Medall, and Mitch Rochon. It was released on February 17, 1998, and takes place during the events of the original film during the song “Something There.”

=== Live-action feature films ===
Belle's Tales of Friendship is a live-action/animated direct-to-video installment of the film series. It was directed by Jimbo Mitchell, and released on August 17, 1999 to help promote Disney Channel's television series, Sing Me a Story with Belle.

A live-action remake of Disney's 1991 animated feature film of the same name was released in March 2017, directed by Bill Condon. The film stars Emma Watson as Belle, Dan Stevens as the Beast, Luke Evans as Gaston, Ewan McGregor as Lumière, Ian McKellen as Cogsworth, Emma Thompson as Mrs. Potts, Kevin Kline as Maurice, and Josh Gad as LeFou.

In December 2025, a new spin-off movie centering around Gaston was announced with David Callaham writing the script from a previous draft by Kate Herron and Briony Redman. The film will have a new actor portraying Gaston and will have 'swashbuckling' undertones.

=== Television productions ===
Sing Me a Story with Belle was a live-action television series created by Patrick Davidson and Melissa Gould. It featured Belle, who owns and manages the bookshop in her village. The show ran for 26 episodes from September 8, 1995, to March 1, 1997. Two episodes from the first season were released with an episode of a failed Beauty and the Beast animated television series and were released direct-to-video as Belle's Tales of Friendship.

In 2020 was announced that it was developing a streaming television series centered on Gaston and LeFou in development for Disney+. The series, serving as a prequel to the 2017 film, was created and written by Josh Gad, Eddy Kitsis and Adam Horowitz, with Gad, Kitsis and Horowitz executive-producing the series alongside Luke Evans. Evans and Gad will reprise their roles from the 2017 film as Gaston and LeFou, respectively. In June 2021, Brianna Middleton joined the cast as female lead. In January 2022, Jelani Alladin and Fra Fee joined the cast, followed by Rita Ora in February. In the same month, Disney+ temporarily paused the project, until it was cancelled to make way for a spin-off movie.

A musical television special, Beauty and the Beast: A 30th Celebration, produced by Jon M. Chu and directed by Hamish Hamilton aired on December 15, 2022, on ABC. The special included live never-before-seen musical performances, along with new sets and costumes inspired by the animated film. H.E.R. has been cast to play Belle. The rest of the cast featured Josh Groban, Joshua Henry, Rita Moreno, Martin Short, Shania Twain, and David Alan Grier as the Beast, Gaston, the narrator, Lumière, Mrs. Potts, and Cogsworth, respectively. Paige O'Hara and Richard White, the original voices of Belle and Gaston, respectively, and composer Alan Menken made cameos in the special.

=== Broadway musical ===
A musical, based on the original film, debuted April 18, 1994, on Broadway at the Palace Theatre and later transferred to the Lunt-Fontanne Theatre in 1999. The musical was directed by Robert Jess Roth, produced by Disney Theatrical, and written by Linda Woolverton. Beauty and the Beast ran on Broadway for 5,461 performances between 1994 and 2007, becoming Broadway's eighth longest-running production in history. The musical has grossed more than $1.4 billion worldwide and played in thirteen countries and 115 cities. The stage version included many songs not included in the musical, such as the deleted songs "Human Again" (whose demo was 9 minutes long) and "Gaston (Reprise)", a Beast number - "If I Can't Love Her", and a Maurice number - "No Matter What". The song "A Change in Me" was kept in the production after being written for Toni Braxton during her stint as Belle.

=== Video games ===
- Beauty and the Beast is an action platformer developed by Probe Software and published by Hudson Soft for the NES. It was released in Europe in 1994. Gaston, logically, is the final boss of the game because he wants to kill the Beast and marry Belle
- Disney's Beauty and the Beast is an action platformer for the SNES. It was developed by Probe Entertainment and published by Hudson Soft in North America and Europe on July 1, 1994, and February 23, 1995, respectively. The game was published by Virgin Interactive in Japan on July 8, 1994. The entire game is played through the perspective of the Beast. As the Beast, the player must get Belle to fall in love so that the curse cast upon him and his castle will be broken, she will marry him and become a princess. The final boss of the game is Gaston, a hunter who will try to steal Belle from the Beast. There is even a snowball fight scene in the middle of the game and cutscenes between stages that tells the story of Beauty and the Beast.
- Beauty and the Beast: Belle's Quest is an action, platformer for the Sega Mega Drive/Genesis. Developed by Software Creations, the game was released in North America in 1993. It is one of two video games based on the film that Sunsoft published for the Genesis, the other being Beauty and the Beast: Roar of the Beast. Characters from the film like Gaston can help the player past tricky situations. As Belle, the player must reach the Beast's castle and break the spell to live happily ever after. To succeed, she must explore the village, forest, castle, and snowy forest to solve puzzles and mini-games while ducking or jumping over enemies. Belle's health is represented by a stack of blue books, which diminishes when she touches bats, rats, and other hazards in the game. Extra lives, keys and other items are hidden throughout the levels. While there is no continue or game saving ability, players can use a code to start the game at any of the seven levels.
- Beauty and the Beast: Roar of the Beast is the title of a side-scrolling video game for the Sega Genesis/Mega Drive. The game was one of two games based on the film released for the Sega Genesis, the other game being Beauty and the Beast: Belle's Quest, both of which were produced by Sunsoft and released in 1993. As the Beast, the player must successfully complete several levels, based on scenes from the film, in order to protect the castle from invading villagers and forest animals and rescue Belle from the evil Gaston. Intermission screenshots between each level help to move the story along, as do mini-games. The Beast can crouch, jump, swing his fists, and use a special roar attack that will freeze the on-screen enemies for a brief period. He can sometimes locate items within a level to restore some of his health, and the game provides unlimited continues. It was often described as having a high difficulty level.
- Disney's Beauty and the Beast: A Board Game Adventure is a Disney Boardgame adventure for the Game Boy Color. IGN gave the game a rating of 6.0 out of 10.
- Disney's Beauty and the Beast Magical Ballroom contains a collection of mini-games around the characters of the film.
- In the Kingdom Hearts series, Beast appears in the first Kingdom Hearts video game as a party member in Hollow Bastion, where he traveled to find Belle, who was kidnapped by Maleficent. Both also appear in Kingdom Hearts: Chain of Memories. A world based on the film, "Beast's Castle", appears in Kingdom Hearts II, Kingdom Hearts 358/2 Days and Kingdom Hearts χ, along with other characters of the film.
- During a limited time Event focused on Beauty and the Beast, the world builder video game Disney Magic Kingdoms included Belle, Beast, Lumière, Cogsworth, Mrs. Potts, Chip and Gaston as playable characters, along with attractions, costumes, and other material based on the film. LeFou and Maurice were also included as playable characters in later updates of the game. In the game the characters are involved in new storylines that serve as a continuation of Beauty and the Beast (also ignoring other material from the franchise).
- Alternate versions of Belle, Beast and Gaston appear as playable characters in the video game Disney Mirrorverse.
- Items of furniture and clothing directly referencing Beauty and the Beast are available in Disney Dreamlight Valley. Belle, the Beast, and Gaston were later added as villagers through updates, with the former two bringing in a realm based on the film, and Gaston being added through the paid expansion A Rift In Time. Belle is also featured prominently on the box art and promotional images for the game.

=== Other media ===
- Disney's Beauty and the Beast: A Concert on Ice was an ice show adaptation broadcast on CBS December 8, 1996, produced by Micawber Productions and Rodan Productions. The ice show starred Ekaterina Gordeeva as Belle and Victor Petrenko as The Beast with Scott Hamilton as Lumiere while Steve Binder directed and as hosts James Barbour and Susan Egan.
- Beauty and the Beast story or characters are included in several Disney on Ice shows including 100 Years of Magic, Follow Your Heart, Magical Ice Festival and Dream Big.
- Beyond the Castle: Stories Inspired by Beauty and the Beast is set of three short films that premiered on Disney's social media via a partnership with Tongal creative crowd sourcing platform and Young Storytellers. Children from the Storytellers, who advance screened the live action movie, wrote scripts base on the characters. The shorts were released around the release of the live action film in 2017.
  - Beauty and the Curse is a live action feature film explaining how the beast's curse comes about. Tamara Sims wrote the short and Maya Rudolph was the director.
  - Pug in a Cup was puppet-based story written by Hana Morshedi and directed by Tucker Barrie about the adventures at a local market of Chip and Gumbo the Pug away from the caste.
  - LeFouston was claymation short about LeFou and Gaston's first meeting with director Kevin Ulrich and writer Robert Nelson.
- A stage musical named Beauty and the Beast Live on Stage is performed live in Sunset Boulevard, at Disney's Hollywood Studios, Walt Disney World. It was also performed at Tomorrowland, Disneyland Park (Anaheim) and Discoveryland, Disneyland Park (Paris). Originally, the show was more like a revue, and not a condensed version of either the film or Broadway show. However it changed considerably from the original version to the presently running version, causing it to more closely resemble the 1991 film. Because the show is condensed to approximately 25 minutes, many cuts and edits are made. The show features the award-winning music from the first film.
- Be Our Guest Restaurant is a quick service and table service restaurant in Fantasyland at Magic Kingdom in the Walt Disney World Resort. The restaurant has the theme and appearance of the Beast's Castle from Disney's 1991 animated film Beauty and the Beast. The name of the restaurant is a reference to "Be Our Guest", the classic song from that film.
- Enchanted Tale of Beauty and the Beast is a trackless dark ride at Tokyo Disneyland telling the story of the film. It opened on September 28, 2020.
- Beast and Belle, played by Dan Payne and Keegan Connor Tracy, appear in the live-action film Descendants, where they are the rulers of Auradon and have a son named Ben. They three return in the sequels Descendants 2 and Descendants 3, where also appears Gaston's son, Gil.
- Gaston appears as the main antagonist in two Lego's animated special, LEGO Disney Princess: The Castle Quest, which was released on Disney+ on August 18, 2023, and a sequel, LEGO Disney Princess: Villains Unite, was released on Disney+ on August 25, 2025.

== Common elements ==
=== Plot and themes ===
The Beauty and the Beast universe encompasses two main locations: a French village and a castle, which are linked by woods. As the three spin-off films all take place within the time period of the original film, the plot of the Beauty and the Beast franchise is encompassed in the original 1991 film, which the other films serving to give added insight to certain parts of the story that were skimmed over (such as when Belle is living in the castle with Beast).

=== Cast and characters ===
List indicators

This section includes characters who will appear or have appeared in more than two films in the series.

- An empty grey cell indicates the character was not in the film, or that the character's official presence has not yet been confirmed.
- ^{Y} indicates a younger version of the character.
- ^{L} indicates an appearance as a live action character.
- ^{S} indicates an appearance as a character's singing voice.

Character	Animated films				Television series	Live-action film
Character	Beauty and the Beast	Beauty and the Beast: The Enchanted Christmas	Belle's Magical World	Belle's Tales of Friendship (Note: Although most of it consists of live action scenes with Belle, most of the characters have their part in the animated segment "Mrs. Potts' Party".)	Sing Me a Story with Belle	Beauty and the Beast
Character	1991	1997	1998	1999	1995–1997	2017
Belle	Paige O'Hara	Paige O'Hara	Paige O'Hara	Paige O'Hara	Lynsey McLeod	Emma Watson
Belle	Paige O'Hara	Paige O'Hara	Paige O'Hara	Lynsey McLeod^{L}	Lynsey McLeod	Daisy Duczmal^{Y}
The Beast	Robby Benson	Robby Benson	Robby Benson	Robby Benson		Dan Stevens
The Beast	Robby Benson	Robby Benson	Robby Benson	Robby Benson		Adam Mitchell^{Y}
Lumière	Jerry Orbach	Jerry Orbach	Jerry Orbach	Jerry Orbach		Ewan McGregor
Cogsworth (Note: In the live-action remake, his first name is revealed to be Henry.)	David Ogden Stiers	David Ogden Stiers	David Ogden Stiers	David Ogden Stiers		Ian McKellen
Mrs. Potts (Note: In the live-action remake, her first name is revealed to be Beatrice.)	Angela Lansbury	Angela Lansbury	Anne Rogers	Anne Rogers		Emma Thompson
Chip	Bradley Pierce	Haley Joel Osment	Gregory Grudt	Gregory Grudt		Nathan Mack
Chip	Bradley Pierce	Andrew Keenan-Bolger^{S}	Gregory Grudt	Gregory Grudt		Nathan Mack
Gaston	Richard White				Wolf Bauer	Luke Evans
Maurice	Rex Everhart	Silent cameo			Unspecified actor	Kevin Kline
Maurice	Rex Everhart	Silent cameo			Unspecified actor	Joylon Coy^{Y}
LeFou	Jesse Corti					Josh Gad
Wardrobe (Note: Known as Madame de Garderobe in the live-action remake.)	Jo Anne Worley		Jo Anne Worley	Jo Anne Worley		Audra McDonald
Featherduster (Note: Known as Fifi in Belle's Magical World and as Plumette in the live-action remake)	Kimmy Robertson	Unknown^{S}	Kimmy Robertson			Gugu Mbatha-Raw
Coat Rack (Note: He was renamed as Chapeau in the live-action remake. Despite this, they are the same character.)	Silent role	Silent role				Thomas Padden
Enchantress (Note: Also known as Agathe in the live-action remake.)	Silent role	Kath Soucie				Hattie Morahan
Enchantress	Silent role	Kath Soucie				Rita Davies (Note: Davies portrays Agathe when she disguises herself as an elderly woman.)
Monsieur D'Arque	Tony Jay					Adrian Schiller
Chef Bouche (Note: He was renamed as Cuisinier in the live-action remake. Despite this, they are the same character.)	Brian Cummings		Jim Cummings	Jim Cummings		Clive Rowe
Bookseller	Alvin Epstein					Ray Fearon
Cadenza						Stanley Tucci
Forte		Tim Curry				
Fife		Paul Reubens				
Angelique		Bernadette Peters				
Webster			Jim Cummings	Jim Cummings		
Le Plume			Rob Paulsen	Rob Paulsen		
Crane			Jeff Bennett	Jeff Bennett		
Chandeleria			April Winchell	April Winchell		
Phillipe	Hal Smith	Frank Welker				Rusty
Bimbettes (Note: Known as The Village Lasses in the live-action remake.)	Mary Kay Bergman					Sophie Reid
Bimbettes	Mary Kay Bergman					Rafaëlle Cohen
Bimbettes	Kath Soucie					Carla Nella
Footstool (Note: Known as Sultan in The Enchanted Christmas and FrouFrou in the live-action remake.)	Frank Welker	Frank Welker	Frank Welker	Frank Welker		Gizmo
Lewis				Jim Cummings	Jim Cummings	
Carroll				Christine Cavanaugh	Christine Cavanaugh	

==== Crew ====
Crew by film
Film	Director(s)	Producer(s)	Writer(s)	Composer(s)	Songwriter(s)	Editor(s)
Beauty and the Beast (1991)	Gary Trousdale & Kirk Wise	Don Hahn	Linda Woolverton	Alan Menken	Howard Ashman & Alan Menken	John Carnochan
Beauty and the Beast: The Enchanted Christmas	Andy Knight	Susan Kapigian	Flip Kobler, Cindy Marcus, Bill Motz & Bob Roth	Rachel Portman	Rachel Portman & Don Black	Tony Migalaski
Belle's Magical World	Cullen Blaine, Daniel de la Vega, Barbara Dourmashkin, Dale Kase, Bob Kline, Burt Medall & Mitch Rochon	Bob Kline & David W. King	Alice Brown, Richard Cray, Carter Crocker, Sheree Guitar & Chip Hand	Harvey Cohen	Michael Silversher & Patty Silversher	Lee Phillips & John Cryer
Belle's Tales of Friendship	Jimbo Mitchell	David W. King	Alice Brown & Richard Cray	N/A	N/A	Parris Patton & Marcus Weise
Beauty and the Beast (2017)	Bill Condon	David Hoberman & Todd Lieberman	Stephen Chbosky & Evan Spiliotopoulos	Alan Menken	Alan Menken, Howard Ashman & Tim Rice	Virginia Katz

== Development ==
=== History ===
A 1995 article by the LA Times regarding the then-new Broadway musical adaption of the 1991 movie (the first Disney film to be adapted for the stage), asked if the property was "Disney's Newest Franchise".

== Reception ==
The original Beauty and the Beast film, as well as the stage musical and live-action remake, have received overwhelmingly positive feedback. The various other aspects of the franchise, such as the direct-to-video sequels, have received mixed to negative reviews.

=== Box office performance ===
Film	Release date	Budget	Box office revenue			Box office ranking	
Film	Release date	Budget	North America	Other territories	Worldwide	All-time North America	All-time worldwide
Animated Films
Beauty and the Beast	November 13, 1991	$25 million	$218,967,620	$206,000,000	$424,967,620	#150	#234
Beauty and the Beast: The Enchanted Christmas	November 11, 1997	Direct-to-video	Direct-to-video	Direct-to-video	Direct-to-video	Direct-to-video	Direct-to-video
Belle's Magical World	February 17, 1998	Direct-to-video	Direct-to-video	Direct-to-video	Direct-to-video	Direct-to-video	Direct-to-video
Belle's Tales of Friendship	August 17, 1999	Direct-to-video	Direct-to-video	Direct-to-video	Direct-to-video	Direct-to-video	Direct-to-video
Live Action Film
Beauty and the Beast	March 17, 2017	$160 million	$504,014,165	$759,506,961	$1,263,521,126	#8	#10

=== Critical reaction ===
Film	Rotten Tomatoes	CinemaScore
Animated Films
Beauty and the Beast	93% (103 reviews)	A+
Beauty and the Beast: The Enchanted Christmas	13% (7 reviews)	—N/a
Belle's Magical World	17% (6 reviews)	—N/a
Belle's Tales of Friendship	—N/a	—N/a
Live Action Film
Beauty and the Beast	71% (348 reviews)	A
