= Disney's Beauty and the Beast (SNES video game) =

1994 platforming video game

Beauty and the Beast
- Developer: Probe Software
- Publisher: Hudson Soft
- Series: Beauty and the Beast
- Platform: SNES
- Release: JP: July 8, 1994; NA: July 1994; EU: February 23, 1995
- Genre: Platform
- Mode: Single-player

Beauty and the Beast is a 1994 platform game for the Super Nintendo Entertainment System. Based on the 1991 animated film of the same name, it was developed by Probe Entertainment and published by Hudson Soft in North America in July 1994 and Europe on February 23, 1995, respectively. The game was published by Virgin Interactive in Japan on July 8, 1994.

== Gameplay ==
The game is played through the perspective of the Beast. As the Beast, the player must get Belle to fall in love with him so that the curse cast upon him and his castle will be broken. The final boss of the game is Gaston, a hunter who attempts to steal Belle from the Beast.

As the Beast, the player fights their way through the castle and the surrounding woods, battling sentient objects and forest creatures. The beast is able to use his claws to attack and is able to roar to stun enemies and activate platforming components. The gameplay is divided into short stages, with a score attributed to each stage.

== Reception ==
On release, Famitsu reported that the game had received a 6/10 in their Reader Cross Review. Contemporary reviews praise the game for its beautiful graphics and note its difficulty.
