= Disney's Beauty and the Beast: A Board Game Adventure =

1999 video game

- North American cover art
- Developer: Left Field Productions
- Publisher: Nintendo
- Producer: James Maxwell
- Designer: James Maxwell
- Programmers: David Ashley; John Brandwood
- Artist: Robert Hemphill
- Composer: Chris Lamb
- Series: Beauty and the Beast
- Platform: Game Boy Color
- Release: NA: October 25, 1999; PAL: December 1999
- Genre: Party
- Modes: Single-player, multiplayer

Disney's Beauty and the Beast: A Board Game Adventure is a 1999 party video game developed by Left Field Productions and published by Nintendo for the Game Boy Color.

== Gameplay ==
The gameplay is similar to the Mario Party series. The game is set up to mimic a board game, with virtual dice rolls and spaces on the board corresponding to various mini games. The first player to make it to the end of the board wins. In addition to the multiplayer mode, where up to four players can participate in normal gameplay, there is also a Story Mode wherein players race Gaston to the castle at the end of the board.

== Reception ==
IGN gave the game a rating of 6.0 out of 10.
