= Be Our Guest Restaurant =

Beauty and the Beast-themed restaurant

Coordinates: 28.421424°N 81.5808468°W

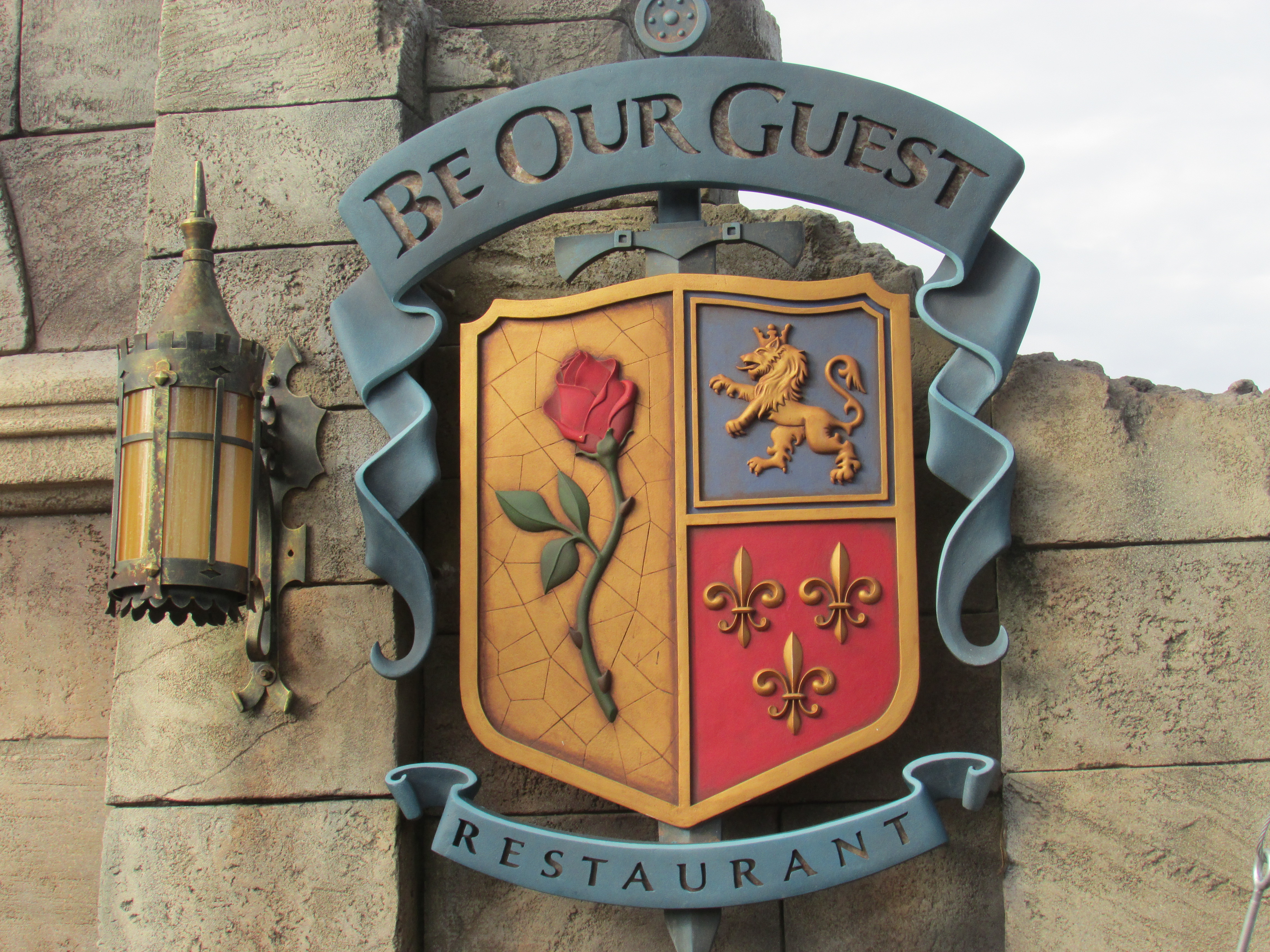
- Interactive map of Be Our Guest Restaurant

Restaurant information
- Established: November 19, 2012 (soft opening); December 6, 2012 (grand opening)
- Food type: American & French
- Location: Bay Lake, Orange County, Florida, United States
- Theme: Beauty and the Beast

Be Our Guest Restaurant is a table service restaurant in Fantasyland at Magic Kingdom in the Walt Disney World Resort. The restaurant has the theme and appearance of the Beast's Castle from Disney's 1991 animated feature film Beauty and the Beast. The name of the restaurant is a reference to "Be Our Guest", one of the signature songs from that film.

== History ==
The restaurant was added as part of a large expansion and renovation in 2012 to Fantasyland's phased opening.

In September 2009, it was announced at the D23 Expo that Fantasyland would be expanded to incorporate Disney Princess characters, along with a larger 3 ring circus-themed Dumbo area (now Storybook Circus). Recent conceptual artwork for the expansion shows several new additions and changes. Included is a new area themed to Disney's Beauty and the Beast featuring the Beast's Castle with a new dining experience, Gaston's tavern, and Belle's cottage.

The restaurant was the only publicly accessible Magic Kingdom venue to serve wine and beer (exclusively at dinner) prior to December 23, 2016, when additional restaurants at Magic Kingdom added it to their menus.

On March 20, 2015, Be Our Guest Restaurant began to serve breakfast meals featuring foods such as eggs florentine and an open-faced egg and poached-bacon sandwich. Breakfast has since been discontinued in the post COVID-19 era with lunch and dinner being served in a table service setting and a limited Prix Fix menu available.

== Restaurant ==
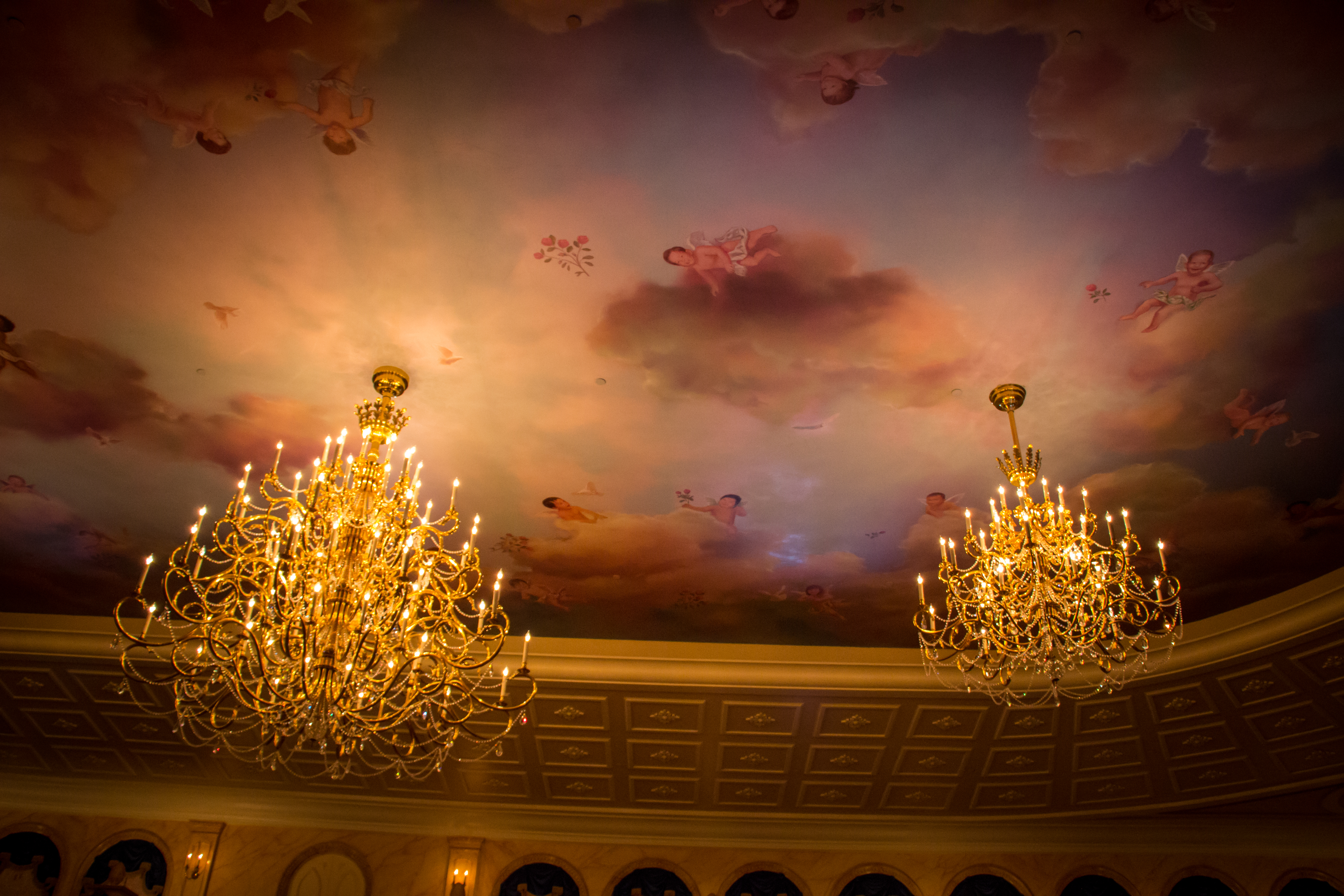
The chandeliers in the ballroom that is based on the ballroom scene from the 1991 film

The castle features a full table service restaurant for lunch and dinner, requiring reservations. Cuisine is French-inspired. There are three dining rooms are located within the castle, the Grand Ballroom where Belle and the Beast had their first dance, the (un)forbidden West Wing where the enchanted rose is kept on display, and the Rose Gallery with paintings and a 7' foot tall wooden music box depicting Belle and Beast dancing.

The Grand Ballroom features baroque windows reaching the ceiling showing an exact recreation of the same view that Belle and the Beast had of the enchanted forest.

The Rose Gallery has murals hand painted by Belle depicting the Enchanted Rose and many characters from the film, including the Beast, Mrs. Potts, Chip, Lumière, and Cogsworth.

The West Wing is the darkest room in the castle with the Enchanted Rose on display and an enchanted portrait of the Prince (before he became the beast) which may occasionally flash and show his now current Beast Form.

== Area attractions ==
=== Enchanted Tales with Belle ===
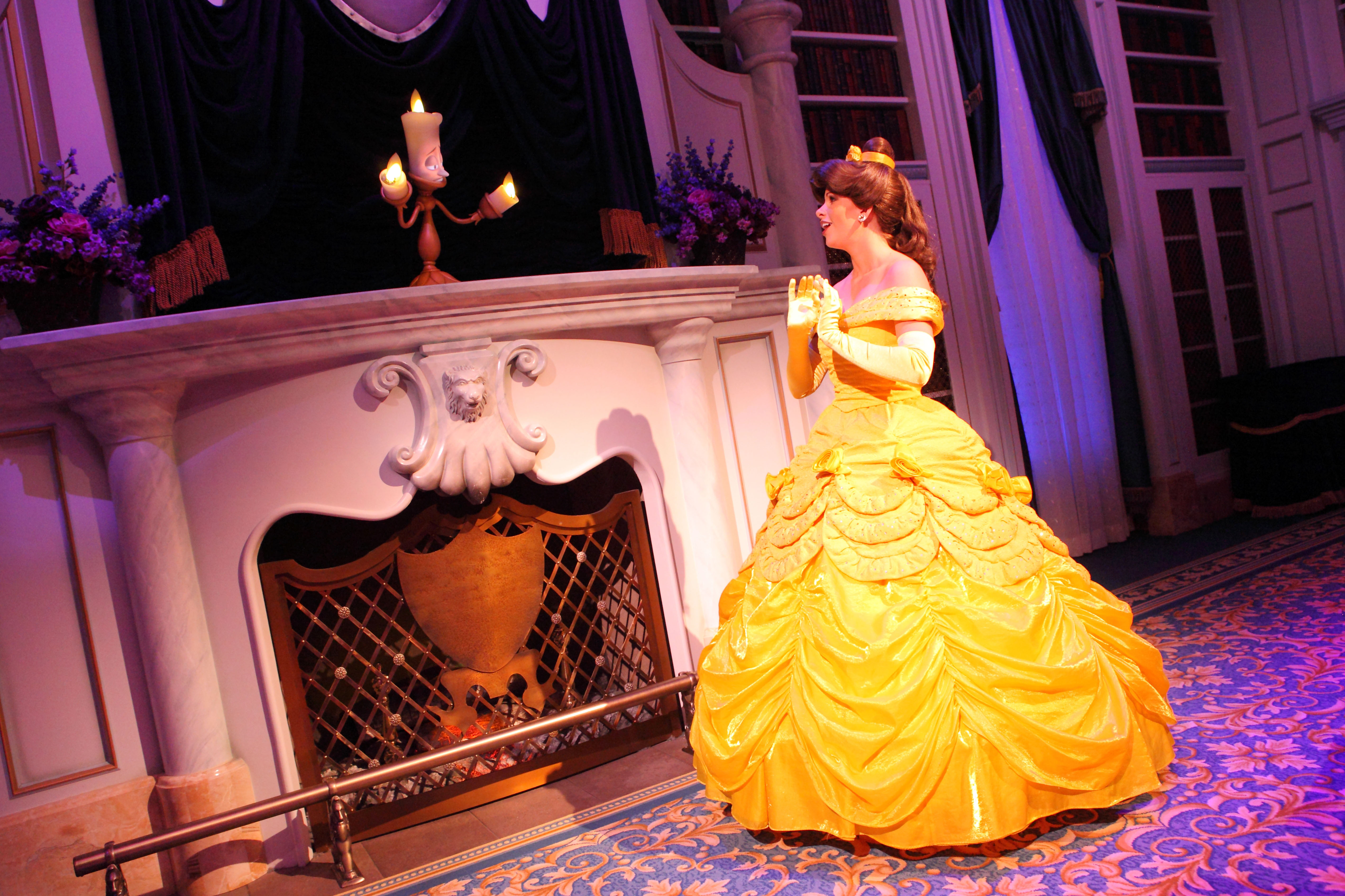
Lumiere and Belle in the library at Enchanted Tales with Belle

Enchanted Tales with Belle is a live interactive show located in within the Beast's Castle. It serves as the replacement for the Storytime with Belle attraction which was originally located in the Fairytale Gardens.

Guests could visit Belle's father's cottage, located at the former site of Ariel's Grotto. They can explore the home and encounter a magic mirror (a gift from the Beast) in Maurice's workshop which transports them to the Beast's Castle. Inside, they meet an audio-animatronic Madame Wardrobe who casts some guests as objects. Guests then head to the library and meet an audio-animatronic Lumiere, who surprises a live Belle with guests. He will then tell the classic story with help from her and the selected guests.

Enchanted Tales with Belle opened in December 2012. On March 12, 2020, Walt Disney World Resort announced that all live shows would be suspended and temporarily closed due to the COVID-19 pandemic. Enchanted Tales with Belle reopened on February 19, 2023, after a three-year hiatus, as part of Walt Disney World's 50th Anniversary celebration and the Disney 100 Years of Wonder celebration.

=== Gaston's Tavern ===
Outside the castle and Belle's house is Gaston's Tavern, another restaurant. It is themed to look like the tavern where Gaston sings his title song in the original film. The tavern features a portrait of Gaston over a large fireplace. Antlers and buckskins hang upon the wall, which is lined with barrels. Gaston's serves up some of the most popular quick service dining snacks including their famous cinnamon roll. Mugs and goblets can be purchased, but alcohol is not served. Instead, a non-alcoholic beverage has been created called "LeFou's Brew", an apple soda with a marshmallow foam topping that looks like the beer served in Gaston's tavern in the film during the song. Just outside is a water fountain of Gaston, holding barrels, with his foot on LeFou, holding mugs.

=== Bonjour Village Gift Shop ===
A gift shop inspired by the village where Belle lived in the film is also part of the area.
