= Paige O'Hara =

American actress

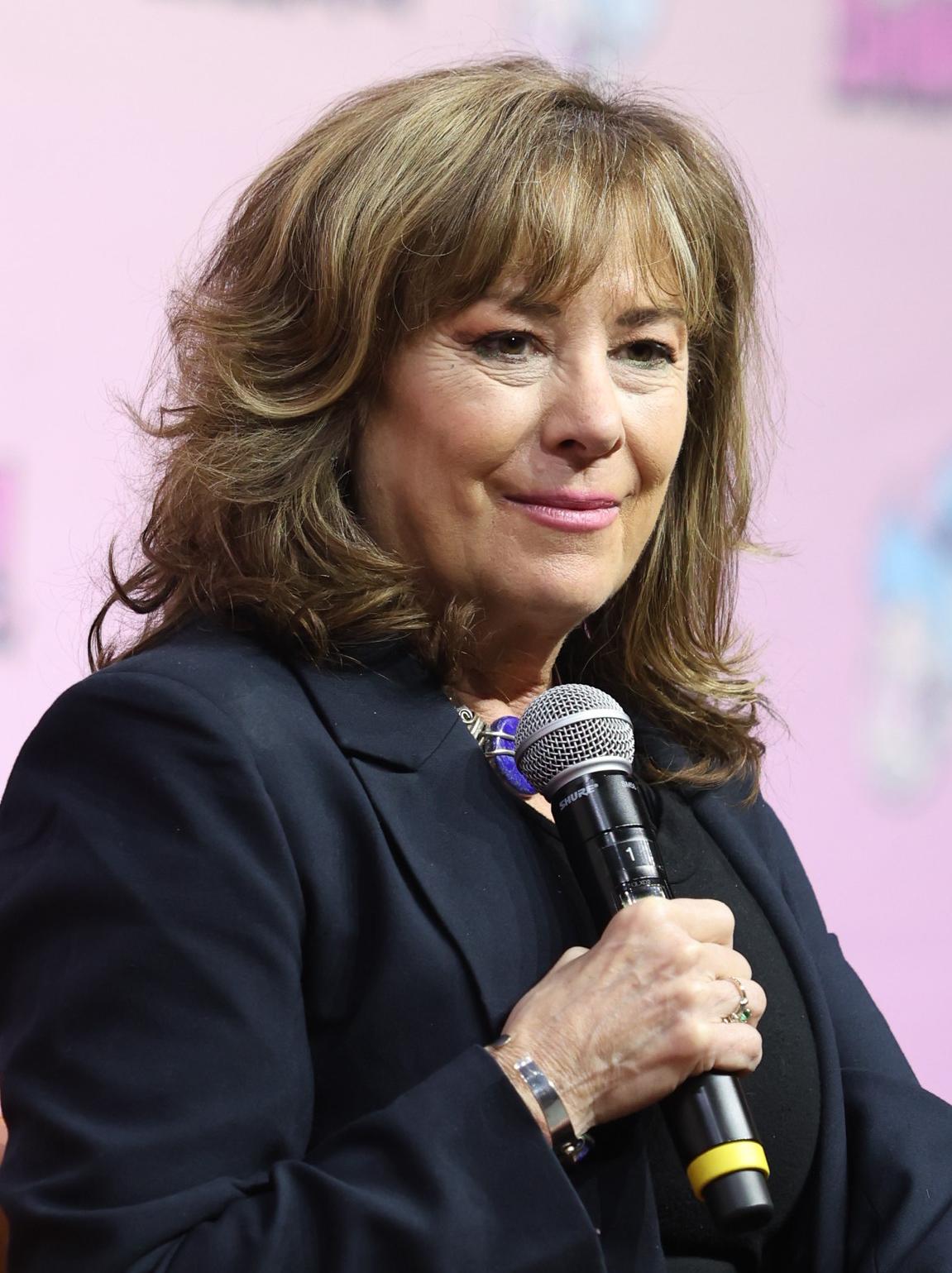
- O'Hara at Animate Miami in 2024
- Born: Donna Paige Helmintoller; May 10, 1956 (age 70); Fort Lauderdale, Florida, U.S.
- Occupations: Actress; singer; painter
- Years active: 1975–present
- Spouses: Lew Resseguie (m. 1980, divorced) Michael Piontek (m. 1990)
- Awards: Disney Legend (2011)
- Website: www.paigeohara.net

Paige O'Hara (born Donna Paige Helmintoller; May 10, 1956) is an American actress, singer, and painter. O'Hara began her career as a Broadway actress in 1975 when she portrayed Della in The Gift of the Magi. In 1991, she made her motion picture debut in Disney's Beauty and the Beast, in which she voiced the film's heroine, Belle. Following the critical and commercial success of Beauty and the Beast, O'Hara reprised her role as Belle in the film's three direct-to-video follow-ups, Beauty and the Beast: The Enchanted Christmas (1997), Belle's Magical World (1998), Belle's Tales of Friendship (1999). She played Belle again in Ralph Breaks the Internet (2018), Once Upon a Studio (2023), and in Disney's How NOT to Draw series for the 35th anniversary of Beauty and the Beast.

== Early life ==
O'Hara began acting at the age of four, attending acting classes in her home state of Florida. It was not until she was 12 years old that she developed an interest in singing and enrolled in a performing arts high school. O'Hara cites American actress and singer Judy Garland as one of her idols.

== Career ==
=== Broadway and stage ===
O'Hara made her first appearance on the Broadway stage as Della in The Gift of the Magi in 1975. She would later play Ellie May Chipley in the revival of Showboat in 1983 starring Donald O'Connor. She repeated the role for the Houston Grand Opera's 1989 production and continued with them when the show was moved to the Cairo Opera House in Egypt. Continuing her legacy as Ellie, she also sang the part on the 1989 Grammy-nominated recording of the musical with Jerry Hadley, Frederica von Stade, and Teresa Stratas, conducted by John McGlinn on the Angel EMI label. Her other American stage credits include the title role in The Mystery of Edwin Drood (Broadway and national tour) and Ado Annie in a national tour of Oklahoma! directed by William Hammerstein. In 1995, she joined the Broadway production of Les Misérables, where she played the role of Fantine.

Internationally, O'Hara has played the role of Nellie Forbush in South Pacific (Australia).

In April 2011, O'Hara played the role of Judy Garland in From Gumm to Garland: JUDY, The Musical at the Tempe Center for the Arts in Tempe, Arizona.

=== Transition to film and Beauty and the Beast ===
A longtime fan of Walt Disney Pictures, O'Hara auditioned for Beauty and the Beast at the age of 33 after reading about the film in The New York Times.

In Season 2 of The Legend of Prince Valiant (which starred her Beauty and the Beast co-star Robby Benson), O'Hara had a recurring role as Princess Aleta (who was later promoted to queen). Benson's character Prince Valiant fell in love with Aleta at first sight.

O'Hara also starred as Venus in the BBC's recorded broadcast of the live presentation of Kurt Weill's "One Touch of Venus" and in tribute to her Belle character from Beauty and the Beast, she portrayed Angela, a character in a fictional soap opera, for Disney's 2007 live-action/traditional 2D animated film Enchanted.

For her work as Belle, O'Hara was honored with a Disney Legend Award on August 19, 2011.

Along with voicing Belle, O’Hara paints for Disney Fine Art and does promotional appearances for Disney. In 2016, O'Hara appeared at numerous special screenings of Beauty and the Beast in honor of the film's 25th anniversary. She also appeared as a librarian in the TV special Beauty and the Beast: A 30th Celebration.

== Personal life ==
In May 1980, in Manhattan, O'Hara married actor Lewis Denton "Lew" Resseguie (May 3, 1932 - June 30, 2019). They met in 1979 while performing in Fiorello! at Paper Mill Playhouse. They later divorced.

O'Hara married actor, Michael Piontek on 25 August 1990.

She is Catholic.

She is of mixed Irish, British, Dutch, and German descent.

== Filmography ==
=== Film ===
Year	Title	Role	Notes
1991	Beauty and the Beast	Belle (voice)	Nominated — Grammy Award for Album of the Year
1997	Beauty and the Beast: The Enchanted Christmas	Belle (voice)	
1998	Belle's Magical World	Belle (voice)	Nominated — Annie Award for Outstanding Individual Achievement for Voice Acting by a Female Performer in an Animated Feature Production
1999	Belle's Tales of Friendship	Belle (voice)	
2001	Legend of the Candy Cane	Jane Aubrey (voice)	
2001	Mickey's Magical Christmas: Snowed in at the House of Mouse	Belle (voice)	Direct-to-video
2004	Sing Along Songs: Disney Princess: Once Upon a Dream	Belle (voice)	Direct-to-video
2005	Disney Princess Party: Volume Two	Belle (voice)	Direct-to-video
2007	Enchanted	Angela	
2016	Always Belle	Herself	Documentary
2018	Ralph Breaks the Internet	Belle (voice)	
2023	Once Upon a Studio	Belle (voice)	Short film

=== Television ===
Year	Title	Role	Notes
1993	The Legend of Prince Valiant	Princess Aleta / Queen Aleta (voices)	9 episodes
1995	The Twisted Tales of Felix the Cat	Girls (voice)	Episode: "Felix in Nightdrop Land/Shocking Story", uncredited
1996	Adventures from the Book of Virtues	The Princess / June Washington (voice)	Episode: "Honesty"
2002	Rapsittie Street Kids: Believe in Santa	Nicole (voice)	Television film
2022	Beauty and the Beast: A 30th Celebration	Bookseller	TV special
2026	How NOT to Draw	Belle (voice)	1 episode

=== Video games ===
Year	Title	Role	Notes
2000	Disney's Beauty and the Beast Magical Ballroom	Belle (voice)	
2005	Kingdom Hearts II	Belle (voice)	English version
2007	Kingdom Hearts II: Final Mix+	Belle (voice)	English version
2007	Disney Princess: Magical Jewels	Belle (voice)	
2007	Disney Princess: Enchanted Journey	Belle (voice)	

== Theatre ==
Year	Title	Role	Notes
1975	The Gift of the Magi	Della	
1979	Fiorello!	Marie	
1980	Naughty Marietta	Lizette	
1980	Paint Your Wagon	Jennifer Rumson	
1983	Showboat	Ellie May Chipley	
1984	The Unsinkable Molly Brown	Molly Brown	
1985	Oh, Boy!	Jacky	
1985	The Mystery of Edwin Drood	Alice Nutting / Edwin Drood	
1986	Oklahoma!	Ado Annie	
1987	Of Thee I Sing	Diana Deveraux	
1988	Mack and Mabel	performer	
1989	Sitting Pretty	performer	
1990	Anything Goes	Reno Sweeney	
1990	The Cat and the Fiddle	Angie Sheridan	
1991	Evita	Eva Perón	
1992	Tiger Lady	Winnie Ruth Judd	
1995	Les Misérables	Fantine	
1995	South Pacific	Nellie Forbush	
1996	Peter Pan	Peter Pan	
1996	Evita	Eva Perón	
2002	Joseph and the Amazing Technicolor Dreamcoat	Narrator	
2014	Menopause The Musical	performer	

== Discography ==
- Jerry Herman: Mack and Mabel in Concert (Live at the Theatre Royal), conducted by David Firman, First Night Records, 1988
- Jerome Kern: Show Boat, conducted by John McGlinn, EMI, 1988
- Loving You: Paige O'Hara Sings Jerry Herman, conducted by Dennis Buck, Varèse Sarabande, 1995
- Rodgers and Hammerstein: South Pacific, conducted by John Owen Edwards, Jay Records, 1996
- Paige O'Hara: Dream With Me, Intersound, 1998
