= Belle's Magical World =

1998 American animated film

- Original VHS edition
- Directed by: Bob Kline
- Screenplay by: Alice Brown; Richard Cray; Carter Crocker; Sheree Guitar; Chip Hand
- Produced by: Bob Kline; David W. King
- Starring: David Ogden Stiers; Robby Benson; Gregory Grudt; Paige O'Hara; Anne Rogers; Jerry Orbach
- Cinematography: Ninky Smedley
- Edited by: Lee Phillips; John Cryer
- Music by: Harvey Cohen
- Production companies: Walt Disney Home Video; Disney Video Premiere; Walt Disney Television Animation (Note: Animation outsourced to Toon City with additional production outsourced to Thai Wang Film Productions.)
- Distributed by: Buena Vista Home Entertainment
- Release date: February 17, 1998
- Running time: 70 minutes (original release); 92 minutes (special edition)
- Country: United States
- Language: English

Belle's Magical World is a 1998 American animated anthology direct-to-video musical fantasy film, made of episodes produced by Walt Disney Television Animation from a failed Beauty and the Beast television series. It was released by Buena Vista Home Entertainment on February 17, 1998. As the second sequel to Disney's 1991 animated feature film Beauty and the Beast and the third and final installment in the Beauty and the Beast films, it features the voices of David Ogden Stiers as Cogsworth, Robby Benson as The Beast, Gregory Grudt, who replaced Bradley Pierce as Chip Potts, Paige O'Hara as Belle, Anne Rogers, who replaced Angela Lansbury as Mrs. Potts, and Jerry Orbach as Lumiere. The film features two songs performed by Belle, "Listen With Our Hearts" and "A Little Thought." The film takes place during the song “Something There.”

When first released in 1998, the film consisted of three connected segments, which are "The Perfect Word", "Fifi's Folly" and "The Broken Wing". For the special edition released in 2003, another segment was included, "Mrs. Potts' Party" (from Belle's Tales of Friendship) making the film 22 minutes longer.

== Plot ==
=== The Perfect Word ===
The Beast and Belle plan to eat together, and the Beast asks for advice from Lumiere. While Cogsworth escorts Belle to the dining room, she meets the castle's well-meaning but rather verbose scribe, Webster, who was transformed into a dictionary. She invites him to join in the dining room, to Cogsworth's dismay.

During the meal, while Belle explains Cinderella, which she has been reading to the Beast, the Beast gets sweaty. He demands for the windows to be opened, despite that there is a draft of air in the room and the servants getting cold. He and Belle get into an argument. He strikes Webster off the table when Webster gives synonyms to Belle's insults. They both stop speaking to each other, despite Lumiere and Cogsworth's attempts to patch things up. Webster and his friends, a pile of papers named Crane and a quill named LePlume decide to forge a letter of apology from the Beast to Belle. Unbeknownst to them, Mrs. Potts overhears their scheme, but she wants Belle and the Beast to make amends so much that she does not tell on them. When Belle sees the letter, she makes amends with the Beast.

However, that night, Cogsworth reveals to him about the letter, which he demands Belle to show him. Mrs. Potts suggests to Webster, Crane and LePlume that they confess their scheme to the Beast. When they do, the Beast chases them around the castle and banishes them as punishment for their scheme. They try to go to Belle’s village, but they get turned around and end up back at the castle. Belle brings them back in and the Beast, touched by Belle's sympathy for them, forgives them. Everyone learns that it is easy to forgive and not to meddle in people’s mistakes.

=== Fifi's Folly ===
On the fifth anniversary of Lumiere's first date with Fifi, Lumiere grows nervous to the point that he cleans himself excessively and turns to Belle for advice, by walking with her in the garden and reciting what he plans to say to Fifi to her. Fifi overhears this, and believes that Lumiere and Belle are having an affair behind her back. In reality, Lumiere has planned a surprise snow ride around the castle gardens with Fifi. To get back at Lumiere, Fifi attempts to make Cogsworth fall in love with her, who is not interested.

In the end, things are cleared up and Lumiere and Fifi go for the ride, but the punch bowl that they are sitting in slips off the edge of the balcony and hangs over the moat. Lumiere holds onto Fifi while hanging for dear life, and tells her that he loves her. Before they can fall, Belle, Cogsworth and a few more servants arrive and get them back to safety. Everyone learns not to reach conclusions too quickly.

=== Mrs. Potts' Party (special edition) ===
Mrs. Potts is feeling depressed due to dreadful weather, and Belle decides to cheer her up by throwing a surprise party for her. Belle has come to look at Mrs. Potts as a mother figure by this point. During preparations for the party, Belle and her friends avoid waking up the sleeping Beast. He spent the previous night fixing a leak in the roof. Lumiere and Cogsworth argue and compete over composing music, choosing Mrs. Potts' favorite flowers, and choosing the flavors of the cake that will be served at the party. Two oven mits, Chaude and Tres, each side with one of them.

Their attempt to sabotage each other's decisions has consequences. The baking cake explodes, making a mess in the kitchen. After a scolding from Belle, they decide to work together to make a small surprise for Mrs. Potts. The plan goes well, Mrs. Potts is cured of her depression, and the sun shines again. Lumiere and Cogsworth learn that if they work with each other instead of against each other, they can create something special.

=== The Broken Wing ===
Belle and the Beast arrange to have lunch together, but an injured bird flies into Belle's room. She forgets their arrangement, instead paying more attention to the bird. The Beast discovers this, and flies into a rage, as he has a strong dislike for birds. When he tries to catch it, he trips over Cogsworth and hits his head on the floor. He gains a liking of singing birds, but his selfishness remains, driving him to put the bird in a cage and demand that it sing for him when he wants, but it refuses.

Cogsworth thinks that he is losing control over his staff and demands respect with harsh treatment. Belle convinces the Beast to release the bird once its wing is cured. The bird, still too weak, begins to fall and the Beast rushes to rescue it. In the process, Cogsworth falls from the West Wing balcony into the garden. The Beast learns to treat anyone with respect, compassion and attention, while Cogsworth learns that he cannot demand respect, but he can earn it.

== Voice cast ==
- David Ogden Stiers - Cogsworth, Narrator
- Robby Benson - The Beast
- Gregory Grudt - Chip
- Paige O'Hara - Belle
- Anne Rogers - Mrs. Potts
- Jerry Orbach - Lumiere
- Kimmy Robertson - Fifi the Featherduster
- Frank Welker - Sultan the Footstool
- Jim Cummings - Webster, Tubaloo, Chef Bouche, Punch Bowl
- Jeff Bennett - Crane, Frappe
- Rob Paulsen - LePlume, Tres, Egg Beater
- April Winchell - Chandeleria, Chaude, Concertina
- Jo Anne Worley - Armoire the Wardrobe

== Production ==
The film consists of three episodes of an unreleased television series, loosely woven together in a feature-length story and also based on the original Disney animated feature. It was produced by Walt Disney Television Animation and animated by Toon City Animation, Inc. in Manila, Philippines and Thai Wang Film Productions in Bangkok, Thailand. Finished and copyrighted in the fall of 1997, at the time when Beauty and the Beast: The Enchanted Christmas was released, the film was originally set for release on January 13, 1998, but was pushed to February 17 for unknown reasons.

== Home media ==
Belle's Magical World was released on VHS in the United States and Canada on February 17, 1998; the film consisted of three connected segments called The Perfect World, Fifi's Folly and The Broken Wing. In the first two days of its release, sales of its VHS copies were more than expected. Ultimately, more than a million copies were sold. At the time, the film ranked among the top 10 top-selling videos of all time, bringing in profits.

The film was retitled to Beauty and the Beast: Belle's Magical World for its Special Edition, when released on VHS and DVD on February 25, 2003, in North America. This release included another segment from the cancelled TV series, called Mrs. Potts' Party, making the film 22 minutes longer. Although this segment was not featured in the original version of the film, its footage of Belle's song "A Little Thought" was featured on a Disney Sing Along Songs home video release in North America and Southeast Asia, Honor to Us All, which featured songs from Mulan (1998), Hercules (1997), Pocahontas II: Journey to a New World, The Lion King II: Simba's Pride, and Disney's other animated productions.

The film was re-released on DVD on November 22, 2011, with a new bonus feature, Sing Me a Story with Belle episode, "What's Inside Counts".

In 2019, the original version of the film was released on Disney+. It marked the first release of the film without the additional segment Mrs. Potts’ Party since the original release on VHS. Despite that, the second song "A Little Thought" has been accidentally removed from this print. Currently, it is the only Beauty and the Beast film available only in standard-definition.

== Critical reception ==
On the review aggregator website Rotten Tomatoes, 17% of 6 critics' reviews are positive, with an average rating of 3.1/10.

DVDDizzy spoke poorly of the "Disney employee who had the idea to salvage episodes created for an animated TV series that wasn't going to materialize by stringing them together as a direct-to-video feature film", noting that it resulted in one of the very worst movies Disney put their name on.

== Awards and nominations ==
Year	Nominee / work	Award	Result
1998	Belle's Magical World	Annie Award for Outstanding Achievement in an Animated Home Video Production	Nominated
1998	Paige O'Hara for playing "Belle"	Annie Award for Outstanding Individual Achievement for Voice Acting by a Female Performer in an Animated Feature Production	Nominated
1999	Belle's Magical World	Golden Reel Award for Best Sound Editing - Direct to Video - Sound	Nominated
