= Jo Anne Worley =

American actress and comedienne (b. 1937)

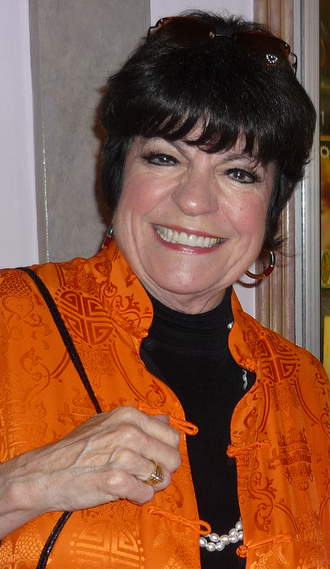
- Worley in May 2010
- Born: September 6, 1937 (age 89); Lowell, Indiana, U.S.
- Occupations: Actress; comedian; singer
- Years active: 1955–present
- Spouse: Roger Perry (m. 1975; div. 2000)

Jo Anne Worley (born September 6, 1937) is an American actress, comedian, and singer. Her work covers television, films, theater, game shows, talk shows, commercials, and cartoons. Worley is widely known for her work on the comedy-variety show Rowan & Martin's Laugh-In.

== Early life and education ==
Worley was born on September 6, 1937, in Lowell, Indiana, the third child of Rose Irene (née Gardner) and Joseph Lauraine Worley. In 1962, her parents divorced and her father remarried, having four children with his second wife, Nancy.

After graduating from high school in 1955, Worley moved to Blauvelt, New York, where she began her professional career as a member of the Pickwick Players. This led to a drama scholarship to Midwestern State University in Wichita Falls, Texas.

== Career ==
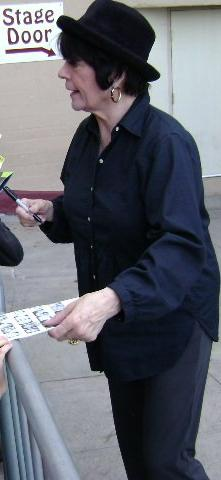
Worley signing autographs at a Wicked performance

After studying at Midwestern for two years, Worley moved to Los Angeles to study at Los Angeles City College and the Pasadena Playhouse. She was soon given her first musical role in a production of Wonderful Town. In 1961, Worley received her first major break when she appeared in the musical revue Billy Barnes People in Los Angeles; this production moved to Broadway, where it ran for only six performances. However, the New York Times reviewer wrote: "Jo Anne Worley has an earthy style that suggests she could be a rowdy comedienne." In 1964, she was selected to appear as a standby for the lead in the original Broadway production of Hello, Dolly! One year later, Worley created her own nightclub act in Greenwich Village, where she was discovered by Merv Griffin in 1966.

Impressed by Worley's talents, Griffin engaged her to be one of his primary guest stars on his show, where she made approximately 40 appearances on The Merv Griffin Show. In 1966, she appeared Off-Broadway in The Mad Show, a musical revue based on Mad Magazine. In 1967, Worley's stint on Griffin's show led to her discovery by George Schlatter, who soon cast her in Rowan & Martin's Laugh-In.

In 1970, Worley left Laugh-In to pursue other projects and has made guest appearances on several television series, including Love, American Style, The Tonight Show Starring Johnny Carson, The Andy Williams Show, Adam-12, Emergency!, Murder, She Wrote, The Middle, and different game shows such as Super Password, Hollywood Squares, and the many versions of Pyramid. She continued working in various movies, television series, and theatrical performances (original productions and revivals alike) over the years. Worley also became known for her work as a voice provider for several cartoons, animated movies, and video games. Her voice work includes Nutcracker Fantasy (1979), the Disney movies Beauty and the Beast (1991), A Goofy Movie (1995), Beauty and the Beast: Belle's Magical World (1998), and the voice of the Wardrobe in the video game Kingdom Hearts II (2005). She remains involved with Disney, making cameos in several Disney Channel sitcoms such as Kim Possible playing the role of Bonnie Rockwaller's mother, Wizards of Waverly Place, and Jessie.

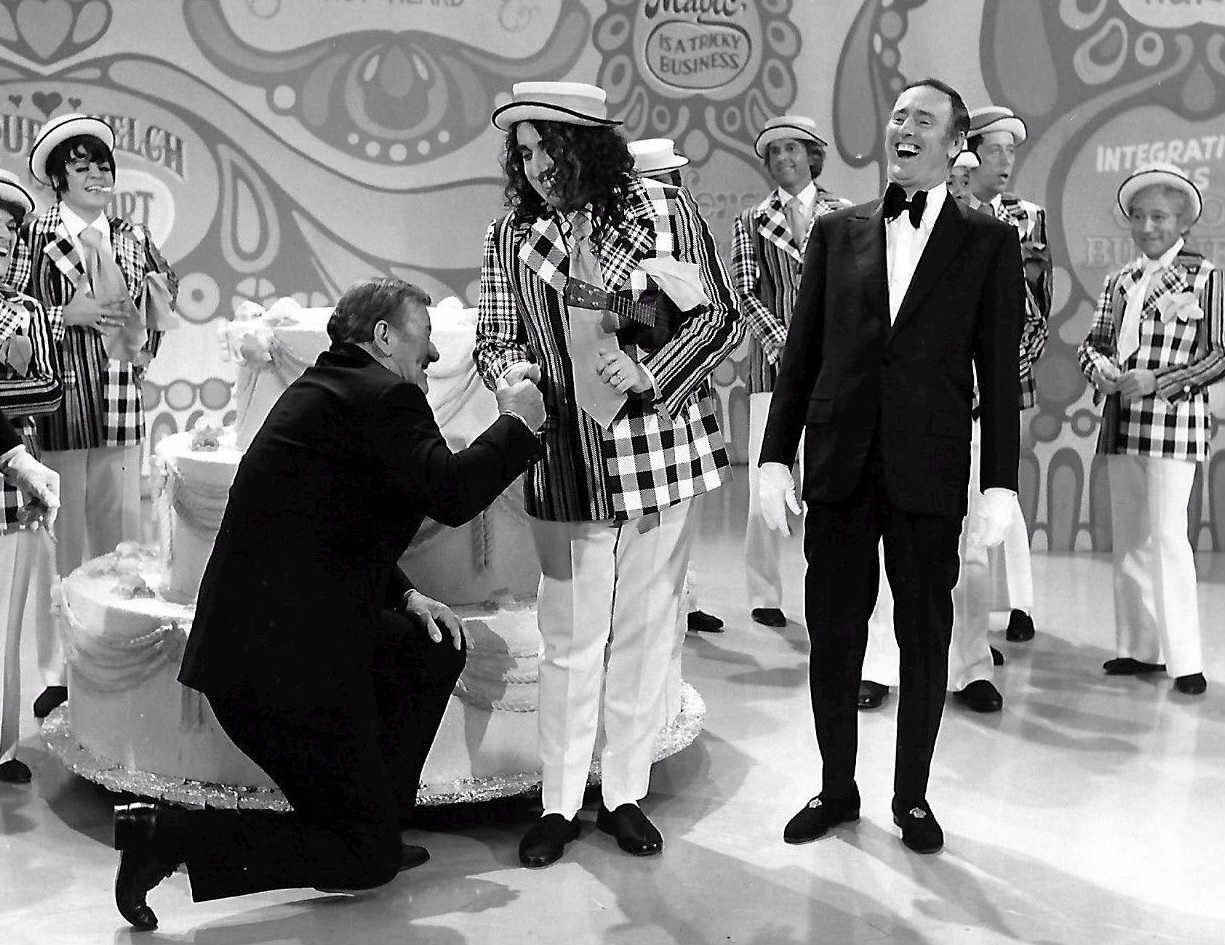
Rowan & Martin's Laugh-In, front L-R: John Wayne, Tiny Tim, Dick Martin. Back, L-R: Ruth Buzzi, Jo Anne Worley, Alan Sues, Dennis Roy Allen, and Henry Gibson (1971).

Worley performed in regional theater, such as the Melody Top Theater in Milwaukee, Wisconsin, where she appeared in Gypsy: A Musical Fable as Rose (1984), Annie Get Your Gun (1982), Hello Dolly! (1980), Anything Goes (1978) and Once Upon a Mattress (1974), She also appeared at the Welk Dinner Theater in San Diego, California in Same Time, Next Year in 1985, Call Me Madam at the California Music Theatre, Pasadena, California, in 1987, and Nunsense at the La Mirada Theatre for the Performing Arts, La Mirada, California, in 1991.

In 1989, Worley returned to Broadway to appear in Prince of Central Park, but the show was canceled after four performances. She was cast as the Wicked Witch of the West in a 1999 musical production of The Wizard of Oz, directed and adapted by Robert Johanson, with Mickey Rooney playing the eponymous role. The production had a limited run at the Pantages Theater, Hollywood, California, and at the Theater at the Theater at Madison Square Garden, and she also joined the limited US tour. Worley played Mrs. Tottendale in the Broadway musical, The Drowsy Chaperone at the Marquis Theatre from July through December 2007. She then reprised the role of Mrs. Tottendale at The Cape Playhouse from June to July 2015.

From January 8 until August 24, 2008, Worley played the role of Madame Morrible in the Los Angeles production of Wicked.

== Personal life ==
Worley is an animal lover. For more than 40 years she has been involved with the organization Actors and Others for Animals, founded in 1971, which funds spay-and-neuter programs, and provides veterinary financial assistance to pet guardians in Southern California. She served on a voluntary basis on the board of directors for several years before becoming vice president, and since 2007, has served as president of the organization.

== Filmography ==
=== Film ===
Year	Film	Role	Notes
1962	Moon Pilot	Extra	Technicolor science fiction and comedy film directed by James Neilson.; Uncredited
1968	Head	Woman in Playtex Bra Ad	Adventure musical satirical film featuring The Monkees and directed by Bob Rafelson.
1976	The Shaggy D.A.	Katrinka Muggelberg	Comedy film and sequel to The Shaggy Dog and directed by Robert Stevenson.
1979	Nutcracker Fantasy	Queen Morphia (voice)	くるみ割り人形 (Kurumiwari Ningyō, lit. The Nutcracker) Japanese-American stop motion animated film. directed by Takeo Nakamura.
1991	Beauty and the Beast	Armoire the Wardrobe (voice)	Animated musical and fantasy film directed by Gary Trousdale and Kirk Wise.
1995	A Goofy Movie	Miss Maples (voice)	Animated musical road comedy film directed by Kevin Lima.
1998	Beauty and the Beast: Belle's Magical World	Armoire the Wardrobe (voice)	Direct-to-video; Musical romantic fantasy film directed by Cullen Blaine, Daniel de la Vega, Barbara Dourmashkin, Dale Kase, Bob Kline, Burt Medall, and Mitch Rochon.; Credited as Joanne Worley
1999	Belle's Tales of Friendship	Armoire the Wardrobe (voice)	Direct-to-video; Live action/animated directed by Jimbo Mitchell.
2004	Goodnight, We Love You	Herself	Documentary written and directed by Gregg Barson.
2008	Forever Plaid: The Movie	The Usher	Musical film directed by Stuart Ross.; Scenes deleted
2012	Carol Channing: Larger Than Life Documentary	Herself	Documentary directed and co-written by Dori Berinstein.
2019	Still Laugh-In: The Stars Celebrate	Herself	

=== Television ===
Year	Title	Role	Notes
1960	The Many Loves of Dobie Gillis	Myrtle Tarantino	Episode: "Baby Talk" (S 2:Ep 3)
1961	Adventures in Paradise	Guest	Episode: "Act of Piracy" {S 2:Ep 18}
1961	The Many Loves of Dobie Gillis	Myrtle Tarantino	Episode: "Goodbye, Mr. Pomfritt, Hello, Mr. Chips" (S 2:Ep 34)
1967	Captain Nice	Rusty	Episode: "One Rotten Apple" (S 1:Ep 14)
1968–1970	Rowan & Martin's Laugh-In	Performer	Contract role
1970	Hot Dog	Host	Contract role; Saturday morning documentary series for children
1970	Pat Paulsen's Half a Comedy Hour	Underwater Wife	Episode: "Episode #1.4" (S 1:Ep 4)
1970	Love, American Style	Maggie	Episode:"Love and the Coed Dorm/Love and the Optimist/Love and the Teacher" (S 1:Ep 19)
1971	The Feminist and the Fuzz	Dr. Debby Inglefinger	ABC Movie of the Week directed by Jerry Paris.
1971	Love, American Style	Guest	Episode: "Love and the Boss/Love and the Jury/Love and the Logical Explanation/Love and the Pregnancy" (s 2:Ep 21)
1971	Night Gallery	Iris Travers	Episode: " House — With Ghost/A Midnight Visit to the Neighborhood Blood Bank/Dr. Stringfellow's" (S 2:Ep 9)
1971	What's a Nice Girl Like You...?	Cynthia	ABC Movie of the Week directed by Jerry Paris.
1971	Love, American Style	Housewife	Episode: "Love and the Detective/Love and the Guilty Conscience/Love and the Mixed Marriage/Love and the Wake-Up Girl" (S 3:Ep 5)
1971	Love, American Style	Susie	Episode: "Love and the Baby/Love and the Big Mother/Love and the Free Weekend/Love and the Jealous Husband/Love and the Old Cowboy" (S 3:Ep 9)
1972	Love, American Style	Mrs. Stevens	Episode: "Love and the Big Surprise/Love and the Security Building/Love and the Ski Lodge/Love and the Happy Unhappy Couple/Love and the Topless Policy" (S 3:Ep 16)
1972	Adam-12	Juju Perrin	Episode: "Mary Hong Loves Tommy Chen" (S 4:Ep 19)
1972	The Mouse Factory	Guest Host	Episode: "Women's Lib" (S 1:Ep 2)
1972	The Paul Lynde Show	Fay	Episode: "An Affair to Forget" (S 1:Ep 12)
1973–1974	It Pays to Be Ignorant	Herself	Panelist
1973–1991	Pyramid	Recurring celebrity guest	Its subsequent versions
1973	Love, American Style	Beverly Arnold Rhode	Episode: "Love and the Games People Play/Love and High Spirits/Love and the Memento/Love and the Single Husband/Love and the Stutter" (S 5:Ep 4)
1973	Emergency!	Screaming Woman	Episode: "Zero" (S 3:Ep 10)
1974–1976	Match Game	Herself	Panelist
1974	The Six Million Dollar Man	Mona	Episode: "Survival of the Fittest" (S1 :Ep 2)
1975	Get Christie Love!	Miss Holmes	Episode: "Murder on High C" (S 1:Ep 16)
1975	New Zoo Revue	Vanessa Gramcracker	Episode: "September 2, 1975"
1977	The Riddlers		unsold game show pilot
1977	The Wonderful World of Disney	Miss Osborne	Episode: "The Mouseketeers at Walt Disney World" (S 24:Ep 6)
1977	Hawaii Five-O	Anna Jovanko	Episode: "Blood Money Is Hard to Wash"
1978	The Love Boat	Sandy Beal	Episode: "A Time for Everything/The Song Is Ended/Accidental Cruise/Anoushka" (S 2:Ep 8)
1978	The Gift of the Magi	Star	Adapted made-for-TV-Movie directed by Marc Daniels.
1979	The Love Boat	Dottie Anderson	Episode: "The Stimulation of Stephanie/The Next Step/Life Begins at 40" (S 3:Ep 14)
1979	CHiPs	Herself	Episode: "Roller Disco: Part 2" (S 3:Ep 2); Uncredited
1979	The Arthur Godfrey Special	Herself	Sketch comedy musical directed by Sterling Johnson.
1981	Through the Magic Pyramid	Mutnedjmet	TV movie directed by Ron Howard.
1981–82	The All New Popeye Hour	Sgt. Bertha Blast	Contract role
1983	The Love Boat	Mrs. Honeycutt	Episode: "The Dog Show: Going to the Dogs/Putting on the Dog/Women's Best Friend/Whose Dog Is It Anyway" (S 6:Ep 25)
1985	Murder, She Wrote	Carla Raymond	Episode" "My Johnny Lies over the Ocean" (S 1:Ep 13)
1985	Super Password	Herself	Game Show Contestant / Celebrity Guest Star
1985	Pound Puppies	Nose	TV movie directed by Alan Zaslove and Ray Patterson.; Credited as JoAnne Worley
1985	The Wuzzles	Hopopotamus	Contract role
1989	DuckTales	Guest	Episode: "The Good Muddahs" (S 2:Ep 14); Credited as JoAnne Worley
1990	Match Game	Herself	Panelist
1992	The Elf Who Saved Christmas	Mrs. Buzzard	Short film directed by Bob Sykes.
1993	Tom & Jerry Kids	Guest	Episode:"Penthouse Mouse/Twelve Angry Sheep/The Ant Attack" (S 3:Ep 21); Credited as JoAnne Worley
1993	The Elf and the Magic Key	Mrs. Buzzard	TV movie directed by Bob Sykes.
1993	The Pink Panther	Mrs. Chubalingo	Episode: "Pilgrim Panther/That Old Pink Magic" (S 1:Ep 10); Credited as Joanne Worley
1995	Family Reunion: A Relative Nightmare	Aunt Kate	TV movie directed by Neal Israel.
1996	Mad About You	Herself	Episode: "Dream Weaver" (S 4:Ep 12)
1998	Caroline in the City	Herself	Episode: "Caroline and the Sandwich" (S 3:Ep 22)
1998	Sabrina, The Teenage Witch	Aunt Beulah	Episode: "Good Will Haunting" (S 3:Ep 6)
1999	Boy Meets World	Mrs. Stevens	Episode: "Pickett Fences" (S 7:Ep 10)
2002	Kim Possible	Mrs. Rockwaller	Episode: "Downhill" (S 1:Ep 5)
2004	Hollywood Squares	Herself	Recurring
2005	Kathy Griffin: My Life on the D-List	Herself	Episode: "Out & About" (S 1:Ep 1–Pilot)
2009	Wizards of Waverly Place	Maggie	Episode: "Alex Does Good" (S 2:Ep 17)
2011	Unscripted	Herself	Episode: "Jo Anne Worley" (S 1:Ep 6); Biography
2011	Bones	Diane Michaels	Episode "The Truth in the Myth" (S 6:Ep 18)
2011	Curb Your Enthusiasm	Rosemary	Episode: "The Smiley Face" (S 8:Ep 4)
2011	Jessie	Nana Banana	Episode: "Zuri's New Old Friend" (S 1:Ep 6); Credited as JoAnne Worley
2012	The Middle	Miss Lambert	Episode: "The Guidance Counselor" (S 3:Ep 21)
2023	Lego Disney Princess: The Castle Quest	Armoire the Wardrobe (voice)	TV special

=== Stage roles ===
Year	Show	Role	Venue	Notes
2008	Wicked	Madame Morrible	Pantages Theatre	Replacement
2007	The Drowsy Chaperone	Mrs. Tottendale	Marquis Theatre	Replacement
1999	The Wizard of Oz	Miss Gultch/The Wicked Witch of the West	National tour	Replacement
1994	Grease	Miss Lynch	Eugene O'Neill Theatre	Replacement
1992	Annie	Miss Hannigan	National tour	Originated role
1989	Prince of Central Park	Margie Miller	Belasco Theatre	Originated role
1981	The Pirates of Penzance	Ruth	National tour	Originated role
1964	Hello, Dolly!	Mrs. Dolly Gallagher Levi	St. James Theatre	Standby
1961	Carnival!	The Incomparable Rosalie	National tour	Originated role

=== Video games ===
Year	Title	Role	Notes
2000	Disney's Beauty and the Beast Magical Ballroom	Armoire the Wardrobe (voice)	
2005	Kingdom Hearts II	Armoire the Wardrobe (voice)	キングダムハーツII (Japanese: Kingudamu Hātsu Tsū), an action role-playing game developed and published by Square Enix in 2005 for the PlayStation 2 video game console.; Credited as JoAnne Worley
2007	Kingdom Hearts II: Final Mix+	Armoire the Wardrobe (archive foootage)	キングダムハーツII (Japanese: Kingudamu Hātsu Tsū), an action role-playing game developed and published by Square Enix in 2005 for the PlayStation 2 video game console.; Credited as JoAnne Worley
