= Beauty and the Beast (1994 video game) =

- German cover art
- Developer: Probe Software
- Publisher: Hudson Soft
- Composers: Jeroen Tel; Nick Stroud; Alan Menken
- Series: Beauty and the Beast
- Platform: Nintendo Entertainment System
- Release: EU: 1994
- Genre: Platform
- Mode: Single-player

Beauty and the Beast is a platform game developed by Probe Software and published by Hudson Soft for the Nintendo Entertainment System. It was released in Europe in 1994.
