= Sing Me a Story with Belle =

American syndicated children's TV series (1995–1997)

- Also known as: Disney's Sing Me a Story with Belle
- Based on: Beauty and the Beast
- Developed by: Buena Vista Television
- Written by: Patrick Davidson; Melissa Gould; Deborah Raznick
- Directed by: Steve Purcell
- Presented by: Lynsey McLeod
- Starring: Kerry Anne Bradford; Jacob Chase; Tim Goodwin; Chris Robles; Kirsten Storms; Julie Vanlue; J.J. Ward
- Voices of: Mary Kay Bergman; Corey Burton; Christine Cavanaugh; Jeff Conover; Jim Cummings
- Opening theme: "Sing Me a Story" by Lynsey McLeod
- Ending theme: "Sing Me a Story" (Instrumental)
- Composer: Andy Belling
- Country of origin: United States
- Original language: English
- No. of seasons: 2
- No. of episodes: 26

Production
- Executive producer: Patrick Davidson
- Editors: Lisa Bianco; Pete Opotowsky; Gary Woods
- Running time: 30 minutes
- Production companies: Patrick Davidson Productions; Buena Vista Television

Original release
- Network: Syndication
- Release: September 8, 1995 – March 1, 1997

Related
- Shining Time Station; Noddy

Sing Me a Story with Belle is an American live-action/animated television series created by Patrick Davidson and Melissa Gould. The series features Belle from Disney's 1991 animated feature film Beauty and the Beast, who owns and manages the bookshop in her village. She is usually greeted by children who would like to hear a story. Belle interacts with the children and narrates vintage Disney animated shorts while doing activities around the bookstore. The series premiered on September 8, 1995, on Disney Channel.

== Development ==
According to Ken Weiner, vice president at Buena Vista Television, using vintage Disney animated shorts allows the show to present a higher quality of animation than would normally be feasible in an educational show that would meet the Federal Communications Commission's E/I standards.

By early 1995, it was said that the show would present two short films per episode (with updated music and voices), which Belle and the children would sometimes interrupt for discussion purposes or to "test cognitive abilities".

The show filmed at the Disney-MGM Studios park of Walt Disney World in Orlando, Florida.

To promote the series, lead actress Lynsey McLeod made public appearances as Belle the 1996 Los Angeles Times Festival of Books.

In an interview with set designer Jimbo Marshall, he said, "First of all, this is a book shop, so we have shelf after shelf overflowing with books -- 3,000 real books. We wanted the look of real dimension that you just can't get with prop books.... The stair railings are decorated with musical notes and treble clefs. The shop is really a reflection of Belle's personality, full of music and wonder and fun."

== Plot ==
Belle (Lynsey McLeod) after having married the prince, bought the bookshop in her village. Helping her are Lewis and Carroll, two magical bookworms, Harmony the Cat and Big Book, a large talking book. The bookstore is visited by local children to whom Belle will sing songs and tell stories, usually with a moral relating to something that's happened that day. Clips from vintage Disney cartoons would often be used to illustrate the stories.

== Cast ==
- Lynsey McLeod - Belle from Beauty and the Beast
- Tim Goodwin - Brioche
- Jacob Chase - Jacob
- Kirsten Storms - Kirsten
- Shawn Pyfrom - Shawn
- Hampton Dixon - 'Little' Hampton
- Jennifer Jesse - Jennifer
- Natalie Trott - Natalie
- Julie Vanlue - Julie
- Kerry Anne Bradford - Kerry Anne
- Chris Robles - Chris
- J. J. Ward - J. J.
- Lindsay Louie - Lindsay
- Trevor Mann - Trevor
- Holly Arnstein - Holly
- Victoria Gregson - Victoria
- Justin Chapman - Justin
- Crysta Macalush - Crysta
- Faryn Einhorn - Faryn
- Corey Hayes - Corey
- Thea Cabreros - Thea
- Kristian Truelsen - Uncle Zack
- Wolf Bauer - Gaston (1 episode, "What's Inside Counts")
- Cyndi Vicino - Inez
- Mary Pat Gleason - Madame Soufflé
- Lindsey Alley - Miss Woohoo
- William Akey - Pierre

=== Voices ===
- Tress MacNeille - Daisy Duck, Lambs, Tillie Tiger, Chip
- Mary Kay Bergman - Fifi, Hansel & Gretel, Elf, Witch
- Sterling Holloway - Winnie the Pooh, Tigger
- Christine Cavanaugh - Carroll the Book Worm
- Jeff Conover - Harmony the Cat
- Jim Cummings - Big Book, Lewis the Book Worm
- Eddie Carroll - Jiminy Cricket
- Wayne Allwine - Mickey Mouse
- Tony Anselmo - Donald Duck
- Bill Farmer - Goofy, Pluto, Practical Pig
- Russi Taylor - Minnie Mouse, Huey, Dewey, Louie
- Maurice LaMarche - Mortimer Mouse, Joe Giraffe
- Corey Burton - Ghosts, Dale
- Will Ryan - Willie the Giant
- Anita Gordon - The Golden Harp

== Episodes (including featured animated subjects) ==
Episode	Title	Summary	Airdate
1	Everybody Needs a Friend	Belle and Brioche the Baker show everyone especially Big Book that everybody needs a friend. Disney Stories: Pluto's Fledgling (1948), Little Hiawatha (1937)	September 8, 1995
2	Feeling Like an Outcast	Belle explains that everybody and thing is different as she finds an old and dusty book and Julie has new glasses. Disney Stories: Ferdinand the Bull (1938), Elmer Elephant (1936)	September 15, 1995
3	Folk Heroes	Belle sings the story of the biggest folk hero who towers them all. Disney Stories: Paul Bunyan (1958)	September 22, 1995
4	Everyone's Special	Tiny Hampton feels inferior. Disney Stories: Goliath II (1960)	September 29, 1995
5	Stick to It (Don't Give Up)	Inez the village mail carrier is not sure that she can stick to her job and Jennifer is not sure that she can stick to playing the trumpet. Disney Stories: Mail Dog (1947), The Brave Engineer (1950)	October 6, 1995
6	Taking Responsibility	Carroll takes full responsibility after accidentally knocking Belle's Bach bust off the shelf. Disney Stories: Little Toot (1948), In Dutch (1946)	October 13, 1995
7	Working Together	The kids help Belle clean up the bookshop except Kirsten. Disney Stories: Morris the Midget Moose (1950), Babes in the Woods (1932)	October 20, 1995
8	Overcoming Fear	Belle tells everybody that they should face their fears like a thunderstorm. Disney Stories: Lambert the Sheepish Lion (1952), Brave Little Tailor (1938)	October 27, 1995
9	Problem Solving: Ingenuity	Belle is trying fix a broken cello shown at the end belonging to Willie the Giant. Disney Stories: Mickey and the Beanstalk (1947)	November 3, 1995
10	Valuing What's Worthy	Axle the auto mechanic arrives at the bookshop as everyone is having a garage sale. Disney Stories: Susie the Little Blue Coupe (1952), The Little House (1952)	November 10, 1995
11	Reap What You Sow	Shawn and Harmony won't help with some chili that everybody is making. Disney Stories: The Wise Little Hen (1934), Three Little Pigs (1933)	November 17, 1995
12	Best Friends	Lewis and Carroll have a big fight. Disney Stories: Goofy and Wilbur (1939), The Pelican and the Snipe (1944)	November 24, 1995
13	Taking the Easy Way Out	Putting a bike together is easy if you don't take shortcuts. Disney Stories: The Grasshopper and the Ants (1934), The Big Bad Wolf (1934)	December 1, 1995
14	Steady Effort	Chris is about to give up on learning a musical piece on the piano that he will be playing at the village fair because it is too hard and Brioche reminds Belle that she has to bake 200 chocolate chip cookies for the village fair and is not sure that she can do it. Disney Stories: The Tortoise and the Hare (1935), Pedro (1943)	December 8, 1995
15	Sibling Rivalry	Big Book isn't talking to his brother as he was the one who lost Big Book's favourite bookmark. Disney Stories: Pluto's Kid Brother (1946)	December 15, 1995
16	Feeling Left Out (Loneliness)	Harmony wants to join the Witty Kitty Club. Disney Stories: Ugly Duckling (1939), The Cold-Blooded Penguin (1945)	December 22, 1995
17	Wonderful World of Music	Belle's Uncle Zack arrives at the book and music shop on the day of his concert just as Shawn is trying to pick a musical instrument to play. Disney Stories: Music Land (1935)	December 29, 1995
18	Creativity and Inspiration	Maurice is stumped on an invention. Disney Stories: Goofy's Glider (1940), Mickey's Trailer (1938)	January 5, 1996
19	Temptation	Carroll finds Madame Soufflé's birthday cake very tempting. Disney Stories: Moth and the Flame (1938), Pinocchio (1940)	January 12, 1996
20	Sleepover	Belle invites everybody for a slumber party at the bookshop. Disney Stories: Lonesome Ghosts (1937), Wynken, Blynken and Nod (1938)	May 3, 1996
21	Talent Show	Belle and her friend Pierre help Justin find his special talent. Disney Stories: Mickey's Amateurs (1937), Mickey's Circus (1936)	May 10, 1996
22	What's Inside Counts	Gaston has invited everybody to his Gaston Day party, which is why nobody has come to the kids' magic show. Disney Stories: Mickey's Rival (1936), The Cookie Carnival (1935)	May 17, 1996
23	Be Yourself	Julie is being Belle instead of being herself. Disney Stories: The Flying Mouse (1934), Society Dog Show (1939)	May 24, 1996
24	Friends in Books	Harmony is writing a book to put on one of Belle's shelves but there is no room. Disney Stories: Winnie the Pooh and the Honey Tree (1966)	February 15, 1997
25	Make a Difference	Belle explains to the kids that people in the world can make a difference. Disney Stories: The Legend of Johnny Appleseed (1948)	February 22, 1997
26	Do Something	Belle thinks that she should get in the game. Disney Stories: Goofy Gymnastics (1949), How to Play Baseball (1942), How to Play Golf (1944), How to Play Football (1944), Wonder Dog (1950)	March 1, 1997

== Syndication ==
This series premiered in first-run syndication in select markets as a sneak preview on September 8, 1995. In August 1996, two videos featuring two episodes each were released as part of the Disney Princess Collection: Chapters of Enchantment and Beauty and the World of Music. In August 1999, two episodes from the first season were released with an episode of an abandoned Beauty and the Beast animated series on the direct-to-video film Belle's Tales of Friendship.

Two episodes were also featured separately as an extra in both the 2011 re-release of Beauty and the Beast: The Enchanted Christmas, and Belle's Magical World.
