= The D Show =

1998 video game

- Developer: Disney Interactive
- Publisher: Disney Interactive
- Platforms: Microsoft Windows; Apple Macintosh
- Release: US: August 18, 1998

The D Show is a 1998 interactive trivia game from Disney Interactive. It was released on August 18, 1998, for Microsoft Windows and Apple Macintosh computers.

== Development and Summary ==
The game was showcased at E3 1998. The D Show has more than 540 multiple-choice questions, 450 Disney fact-or-fiction items, more than 150 film clips, 60 bonus rounds in a wide variety of categories, multiplayer capabilities for up to three people or teams, and a theme song.

== Reception ==
Reception

Review scores
Publication	Score
Marshfield News-Herald	3.5/5
The Des Moines Register	4/5

The Des Moines Register said "As for the family room test, children and adults are winners here. It's a refreshing way to spend quality time."

Marshfield News-Herald said "To enhance the game are 150 video clips from various Disney productions, along with a catchy theme song that players can sing along with as the closing credits roll. In short, "The D Show" is far from a Mickey Mouse game."

MacHome Journal said "Kids who have logged hundreds of hours in front of The Little Mermaid or the Lion King will be rewarded for their time spent, here if nowhere else, making it something that the whole family can play. This is, however, really a title for the Disney lover; regular trivia fans probably won't find enough in here to keep them inspired".

Kids Domain said "If your family has ever seen a Disney movie-cartoon-show or gone to Disney Land-World-etc (okay, that should be about everybody...) then you will enjoy this game"
