= Belle's Tales of Friendship =

- VHS cover art
- Directed by: Jimbo Mitchell
- Written by: Alice Brown; Richard Cray
- Produced by: David W. King
- Starring: Lynsey McLeod; Paige O'Hara; Robby Benson; Kirsten Storms
- Production companies: Walt Disney Home Video; Walt Disney Television Animation
- Distributed by: Buena Vista Home Entertainment
- Release date: August 17, 1999
- Running time: 70 minutes
- Country: United States
- Language: English

Belle's Tales of Friendship is a 1999 American direct-to-video live action animated fantasy film. It is based on the syndicated television series Sing Me a Story with Belle, for which a live-action Belle tells stories from Disney cartoons such as The Wise Little Hen, The Three Little Pigs, Morris the Midget Moose and Babes in the Woods. The film stars Lynsey McLeod, who continues portraying Belle in live-action form.

It also stars Paige O'Hara, Robby Benson, David Ogden Stiers, and Jerry Orbach, who reprise their roles as Belle, Beast, Cogsworth, and Lumiere, respectively, in the animated form, in the short film Mrs. Potts' Party, which later was also used for the special edition released in 2003 of Belle's Magical World. The film was released on VHS on August 17, 1999.

== Plot ==
=== Belle's narration ===
Belle owns and works at the bookstore in her village. A group of children walk into the store eager to hear Belle's stories, as she is noted to be a great storyteller. Belle agrees to tell a story, but the gang also plays games and learns some simple lessons on life. Belle narrates two Disney cartoons, Morris the Midget Moose and Hansel and Gretel, while the children help Belle clean the bookstore. She also reads The Wise Little Hen and The Three Little Pigs, but Shawn and Harmony will not help make chili for the group. Along the way, Belle adds music and interacts with the children.

=== Mrs. Potts' Party ===
Mrs. Potts is feeling depressed due to dreadful weather, and Belle decides to cheer her up by throwing a surprise party for her. Belle has come to look at Mrs. Potts as a mother figure by this point. During preparations for the party, Belle and her friends avoid waking up the sleeping Beast. He spent the previous night fixing a leak in the roof. Lumiere and Cogsworth argue and compete over composing music, choosing Mrs. Potts' favorite flowers, and choosing the flavors of the cake that will be served at the party. Two oven mits, Chaude and Tres, each side with one of them.

Their attempt to sabotage each other's decisions has consequences. The baking cake explodes, making a mess in the kitchen. After a scolding from Belle, they decide to work together to make a small surprise for Mrs. Potts. The plan goes well, Mrs. Potts is cured of her depression, and the sun shines again. Lumiere and Cogsworth learn that if they work with each other instead of against each other, they can create something special, accompanied by the song A Little Thought.

== Cast ==
=== Live-action ===
- Lynsey McLeod - Belle
- Shawn Pyfrom - Shawn
- Kirsten Storms - Kirsten
- Natalie Trott - Natalie
- Hampton Dixon - Hampton
- Jennefer Jesse - Jennefer
- Julie Vanlue - Julie
- Jim Cummings - Lewis/Big Book (voice)
- Christine Cavanaugh - Carroll (voice)
- Jeff Conover - Harmony (Voice)

=== Animated ===
- Paige O'Hara - Belle
- Robby Benson - The Beast
- David Ogden Stiers - Cogsworth
- Jerry Orbach - Lumiere
- Gregory Grudt - Chip
- Anne Rogers - Mrs. Potts
- Jo Anne Worley - The Wardrobe
- Frank Welker - Sultan
- Jim Cummings - Webster, Chef Bouche, Tubaloo, Big Book
- Jeff Bennett - Crane, Frappe
- Rob Paulsen - LePlume, Tres
- April Winchell - Chandeleria, Chaude, Concertina
