= Beauty and the Beast: The Enchanted Christmas =

1997 American direct-to-video film

- North American VHS cover
- Directed by: Andy Knight
- Written by: Flip Kobler; Cindy Marcus; Bill Motz; Bob Roth
- Produced by: Susan Kapigian
- Starring: Paige O'Hara; Robby Benson; Jerry Orbach; David Ogden Stiers; Angela Lansbury; Haley Joel Osment; Bernadette Peters; Tim Curry; Paul Reubens
- Edited by: Daniel Lee
- Music by: Rachel Portman
- Production company: Walt Disney Television Animation
- Distributed by: Walt Disney Home Video
- Release date: November 11, 1997
- Running time: 72 minutes
- Country: United States
- Language: English

Beauty and the Beast: The Enchanted Christmas is a 1997 American direct-to-video animated Christmas musical fantasy film produced by Walt Disney Television Animation and Disneytoon Studios, as a sequel to Disney's 1991 animated feature film Beauty and the Beast. The film was released by Walt Disney Home Video on November 11, 1997. While a frame story is set after the events of the original film, the main narrative is a flashback recounting Belle and the Beast's first Christmas together. The film sold 7.6 million VHS tapes in 1997.

== Plot ==
Several months after the Prince was returned to human form, a Christmas party is held at the castle, with most of the villagers in attendance. While reminiscing about the previous year's celebration, Lumière and Cogsworth get into an argument over who "saved" that Christmas, leading Mrs. Potts to tell the villagers the story.

A few weeks after the Beast saved Belle from the wolves, Belle and the servants are anticipating the coming Christmas. However, the Beast is not because Christmas is when the spell was cast. After bumping into each other in the courtyard, Belle teaches the Beast how to skate. They are observed from a room in the West Wing by Forte, the castle's music conductor who was transformed into a pipe organ, and his piccolo minion, Fife. Forte has a passion for ominous music that went underappreciated when he was human, but his music is now more appreciated because it makes the Beast feel better, leading Forte to no longer wish to become human again.

Forte sends Fife to sabotage Belle and the Beast's newfound friendship by promising to give Fife a solo, causing Belle and the Beast to crash into the snow. When Belle makes a snow angel, the Beast sees his beastly snow figure and storms off in anger. Despite the Beast's misgivings, Belle decides to celebrate Christmas, even enlisting the help of Angelique, the castle's decorator who was transformed into an Angel ornament. She and Chip try to find a good Christmas tree, but all of the trees on the castle's premises are small and underwhelming. Forte lures them in his room, where he suggests that they can retrieve a larger tree from the Black Forest. Though this would break her promise to not leave the castle's premises, Belle agrees in hopes it will make the Beast happy.

When the Beast looks for Belle, Forte lies that she abandoned him and manipulates him into a rage. The Beast destroys the Christmas decorations in the dining room before storming off to look for Belle. In the Black Forest, Belle and Chip find a good tree, unknowingly followed by Fife. Fife accidentally startles Phillipe, causing a chain reaction that leads to Belle falling through ice and almost drowning. The Beast saves her, but confines her to the dungeons as punishment for leaving the castle's premises. While Belle is comforted by the servants and Fife, Forte tempts the Beast to destroy the rose when a petal falls on the storybook that Belle made for him. After reading it, he realizes that she wants him to be happy, the Beast goes to Belle and apologizes for the cruel treatment and agrees to celebrate Christmas.

Not wanting his music to be underappreciated again, Forte attempts to destroy the castle with his music, thinking that Belle and the Beast cannot fall in love if they are dead. Fife tries to stop Forte, thinking that this is too extreme, but Forte rebukes him and reveals he was never planning to give Fife a solo. Belle and the Beast confront Forte while Lumière, Cogsworth and Angelique save the rose. Forte's music disorients the Beast, but Fife reveals that Forte's power comes from his keyboard. The Beast separates Forte's keyboard from him and smashes it before Forte's bolts rip from the wall, causing Forte to crash to the floor and killing him. Despite learning Forte's true nature, the Beast still mourns his friend's death. Soon after, the castle is repaired, the Beast pardons Fife, and Christmas is celebrated.

As she finishes the story, Mrs. Potts concludes that it was Belle who saved Christmas. Belle and the Prince enter the court to greet their guests, giving Chip a storybook as a gift. While new music conductor Fife leads the orchestra, Belle and the Prince share a moment on the balcony where he gives her a rose as a gift.

== Voice cast ==
- Paige O'Hara as Belle
- Robby Benson as the Beast
- Jerry Orbach as Lumière
- David Ogden Stiers as Cogsworth
- Angela Lansbury as Mrs. Potts
- Haley Joel Osment as Chip
  - Andrew Keenan-Bolger provides Chip's singing voice
- Bernadette Peters as Angelique
- Paul Reubens as Fife
- Tim Curry as Forte
- Frank Welker as Phillippe the Horse, Sultan, and Wolves
- Jeff Bennett as Axe
- Kath Soucie as The Enchantress
- Rodger Bumpass as additional vocals

== Production ==
In the wake of the success of The Return of Jafar (1994), The Walt Disney Company opened the Walt Disney Animation Canada studios in January 1996 to produce direct-to-video and potential theatrical films, as well as utilize the talent pool of Canadian animators. With 200 animators hired, Disney Animation Canada had two separate animation facilities in Toronto and Vancouver which were supervised by Joan Fischer, a former Canadian public television executive. Their first project was Beauty and the Beast: The Enchanted Christmas, which went into pre-production later that spring. Additional animation work was done by Walt Disney Television Animation Australia, Wang Film Productions Co., Ltd. located in Xindian District, Taipei, Taiwan, and Character Builders. It was Disney's first direct-to-video animated film to use digital ink and paint.

Initially, the film was going to be a direct sequel to the original film with the main villain slated to be Gaston's younger brother Avenant, named for the antagonist of the French 1946 live action black and white film Beauty and the Beast (La Belle et la Bête). Avenant's goal was to avenge Gaston by ruining the lives of Belle and the prince and threatening to kill them, reportedly using sorcery to transform the prince back into a Beast and frame Belle for it. Although he was cut out of the story and the plot had changed, these traits were incorporated into Forte, the pipe organ, who did not want the Beast to become human again. Unlike the other characters, Forte was entirely computer animated.

== Release ==
The film was first released on VHS and LaserDisc by Walt Disney Home Video in the United States and Canada on November 11, 1997. Four Beauty and the Beast: The Enchanted Christmas snow domes could be obtained with the purchase of the video and Ocean Spray products, as well as a $5 mail-in rebate from Lever 2000. A bare-bones DVD was released on October 14, 1998.

Both editions were quickly taken out of print, and the film remained unavailable until Disney released the Special Edition DVD and VHS on November 12, 2002, just a month after the studio released the original film's Platinum Edition DVD and VHS release. The new DVD featured a remake music video of the song "As Long As There's Christmas" by Play. Also featured was a game titled Forte's Challenge, a 10-minute behind-the-scenes featurette, Disney Song Selection, and Enchanted Environment, where it shows the Beast's Castle during the different seasons. The original film's Platinum Edition and this film's Special Edition were taken out of print at the same time in January 2003.

A Special Edition of the film was released on DVD and on Blu-ray/DVD combo packs on November 22, 2011, following the release of the Diamond Edition of the first film on October 5, 2010. In Australia, the film was released on Region 4 DVD on November 3, 2011, with the same features as the original Beauty and the Beast: The Enchanted Christmas DVD. The Blu-ray release was placed into the Disney Vault along with the other two films.

A little over one month after the first film's 25th anniversary Signature Edition was released, Walt Disney Studios Home Entertainment re-released Beauty and the Beast: The Enchanted Christmas on October 25, 2016, on DVD as well as a Blu-ray / DVD / Digital HD combo pack — the latter of which was a Disney Movie Club Exclusive.

In 2019, the film was released on Disney+.

== Reception ==
Review aggregator website Rotten Tomatoes reported that the film has a 10% "rotten" approval rating with an average rating of 4.1/10, based on 10 reviews.

Ty Burr, reviewing for Entertainment Weekly, graded the film a C−, concluding in his review, "All in all, a pretty soggy Christmas fruitcake. Will your kids eat it up? Sure, and that makes Enchanted Christmas worth a rental. But Disney really wants you to put this sucker in your permanent collection. And next to Beauty and the Beast — still the company's crown jewel — Christmas looks like a lump of coal."

== Accolades ==
Award	Result
Annie Award: Outstanding Individual Achievement for Directing in an Animated Feature Production for director Andrew Knight	Nominated
Annie Award: Outstanding Individual Achievement for Music in an Animated Feature Production for "As Long As There's Christmas" by Rachel Portman and Don Black	Nominated
Annie Award: Outstanding Individual Achievement for Voice Acting by a Male Performer in an Animated Feature Production for Tim Curry	Nominated
Annie Award: Outstanding Individual Achievement for Voice Acting by a Male Performer in an Animated Feature Production for Jerry Orbach	Nominated
Annie Award: Outstanding Individual Achievement for Writing in an Animated Feature Production for the Writers	Nominated

== Music ==
Beauty and the Beast: The Enchanted Christmas

Soundtrack album by Various Artists
- Released: September 16, 1997
- Genres: Soundtrack; Christmas
- Length: 46:44
- Label: Walt Disney
- Producers: Bambi Moe; Jay Landers; Harold J. Kleiner

A soundtrack was released on September 16, 1997. The original score and songs were composed by Rachel Portman with lyrics written by Don Black, marking the first time in history that a Disney animated feature film has been scored by a woman. The film's songs were recorded "live" with an orchestra and the cast in a room, similar to the first film.

"Stories", sung by Paige O'Hara, is about what Belle will give the Beast for a Christmas: a story book, and is heavily based on the motif in the finale of Jean Sibelius' symphony no. 5. "As Long as There's Christmas", the theme of the film, is about finding hope during Christmas Time. The song was sung by the cast of the film with a back-up chorus and is sung when Belle and the enchanted objects redecorate the castle for Christmas. "Don't Fall in Love", sung by Tim Curry, displays Forte's plan on keeping the Beast away from Belle to stop the spell from breaking. "A Cut Above the Rest", also sung by the cast, is about how teamwork and friends are very important in life.

"Deck the Halls" is performed during the opening title by Jerry Orbach, David Ogden Stiers, Bernadette Peters, and the Chorus. Tracks 8 to 15 also act as a Christmas album of traditional carols sung by Paige O'Hara.

All tracks are written by Rachel Portman.

No.	Title	Performer(s)	Length
1.	"Deck the Halls"	Jerry Orbach, David Ogden Stiers, Angela Lansbury, Bernadette Peters & Chorus
2.	"Stories"	Paige O'Hara
3.	"As Long as There's Christmas"	Paige O'Hara, Jerry Orbach, David Ogden Stiers, Angela Lansbury, Bernadette Peters & Chorus
4.	"Don't Fall in Love"	Tim Curry
5.	"As Long as There's Christmas (Reprise)"	Paige O'Hara & Bernadette Peters
6.	"A Cut Above the Rest"	Jerry Orbach, David Ogden Stiers & Paige O'Hara
7.	"As Long as There's Christmas (End Title)"	Peabo Bryson & Roberta Flack

== See also ==
- Belle's Magical World - Sequel to the 1991 film
- Belle's Tales of Friendship - Another direct-to-video Beauty and the Beast film
- List of Christmas films
