= Richard Cray =

American actor and singer

- Also known as: Dickie Cray
- Born: Richard Edward Cray; September 10, 1958 (age 68)
- Genre: Musical theatre
- Occupations: Singer, actor
- Instruments: Vocals
- Website: richardcray.com

Richard Cray (born 1958) is an American actor and singer.

== Education ==
A native of Kinston, North Carolina, Richard was chosen as a teenager to participate in a unique educational program called The "Governor's School of North Carolina". This program was the first of its kind for gifted students in the United States. Every year students compete for one of the precious slots in their artistic or academic field.

Richard received his formal education at North Carolina School of the Arts and Indiana University School of Music where he studied voice with Walter Cassel, a 25-year veteran of the Metropolitan Opera. Richard also studied vocal jazz styles with Eileen Farrell, and coached lieder with John Wustman. Opera roles performed include Count Almaviva in Mozart's "The Marriage of Figaro" Papageno in Mozart's "The Magic Flute", and Escamillo in Bizet's "Carmen".

== Career ==
=== As a boy soprano ===
Richard began singing when he was nine years old. Possessing a true boy soprano voice, he was in great demand appearing in more than twenty plays, concerts and musicals before the age of twelve, including a co-star role as "Patrick Dennis" with Broadway actress Denise Lor in "Mame".

=== As an adult ===
After formal schooling Richard spent a year traveling around the world as a solo artist aboard The Royal Viking Star. Ports of call included; Australia, New Zealand, Bora Bora, Moorea, Singapore, Bangkok, Bali, Hong Kong, Shanghai, Beijing, Japan, Hawaii, Canada, Alaska and South America.

Following his lifelong friend and mentor Keith Keen to New York City, Richard made his Broadway debut (cast by writer Rupert Holmes and director Wilford Leach) in the New York Shakespeare Festival's Tony Award winning production of "The Mystery of Edwin Drood" at the Imperial Theatre where he was placed into the show by Rob Marshall, assistant to show choreographer Graciela Daniele. Soon after, Richard starred off-Broadway, opposite George Hearn and Rob Morrow in the musical version of Chaim Potok's celebrated novel "The Chosen".

Other credits include: "Windy City" at the Paper Mill Playhouse, a new musical workshop recording for Sheldon Harnick, and appearing as Billy Bigelow (opposite Rebecca Luker as "Julie) in the Lake George Opera Festival production of Rodgers and Hammerstein's "Carousel". In New York, Richard studied acting at HB Studios, also with John Hirsch and Sanford Meisner. Richard's NYC vocal coach was Andrew Cooke. During his first year in New York, Richard performed with "Harbor Lights" a vocal quartet that opened for headliners in the Catskills.

A solo appearance with the San Diego Symphony celebrating the 100th birthday of Cole Porter (Jack Everly Conductor) and a guest appearance at the Crystal Cathedral brought Richard to the West Coast, where he performed in the Hollywood Bowl Orchestra's musical recording for the classic science fiction movie "Thing's to Come".

In the summer of 1993, Richard was asked to perform in The "Tomorrows Realities Gallery" at the annual SIGGRAPH convention held in Anaheim, CA. as "Dynamation Man" giving voice and movement to a live, animated character. This event turned out to be the first live, operatic performance in digital real-time computer generated animation using a full upper-body Waldo and data glove with a single performing vocal artist interfaced with a character in total control. This project led Richard to perform and direct "A Musical Performance Animation" with composer Steven Bowen, an accomplished musician and arranger for the creation of a seven-minute singing musical story giving life to three computer generated characters; Pirate King, Reggae Man and the Sunny Boy, featured on CNN and in Computer Graphics World Magazine.

In May 2003, Richard starred in the title role of the MAPA / Maui Civic Light Opera's production of Maury Yeston's Phantom, directed by John Langs at the Maui Arts & Cultural Center Castle Theater.

Long Leaf Opera Company (Chapel Hill, North Carolina) production of "Kismet". as the "Wazir".

Richard most recently performed in the Maui Academy of Performing Arts (MAPA) 2024 production of Man of La Mancha in the lead role as "Don Quixote / Miguel de Cervantes" opposite Amy Hānaialiʻi Gilliom as Aldonza / Dulcinea, directed by David C. Johnston at the Maui Arts & Cultural Center Castle Theater.

=== Other Work ===
Richard founded the "Performance Animation Society" a special interest group catering to the needs of performing and creative professionals involved with the emerging technology of performance capture. He developed and created dynamic and ongoing innovative and entertaining projects with what he calls "the future of performing artists" through this innovative forum.
