= Disney's Beauty and the Beast Magical Ballroom =

2000 video game

- Developer: Creative Capers Entertainment
- Publisher: Disney Interactive
- Directors: David Molina, Natasha Sasic, Terry Shakespeare
- Producers: Jacqueline Valle, Seth Shapiro, Patrice Monis
- Designers: Bonnie Leick, Matt Bates
- Artist: Victoria Pellouchoud
- Series: Beauty and the Beast
- Platform: Windows
- Release: 2000
- Genres: Action, strategy

Disney's Beauty and the Beast Magical Ballroom is a 2000 video game collection and part of Disney's Beauty and the Beast media franchise.

== Summary ==
The software contains a collection of children's minigames based on the Disney animated movie Beauty and the Beast, involving Belle and her friends throwing a party for Beast.

== Development ==
This and Disney’s The Little Mermaid II: Return to the Sea were designed to "combine girls’ creative interests with their natural play patterns".

== Reception ==
SuperKids said the package "offers the same enchanting theme and endearing characters we loved" in the film, commending its "creativity and problem solving activities" as "well-planned and enjoyable", while criticising its difficulty and lack of a developed storyline. Strange Little Games said it was suitable for children and fans of the franchise.
