= Beast (Disney character) =

Character from the Beauty and the Beast

- First appearance: Beauty and the Beast (1991)
- Created by: Linda Woolverton (film adaptation)
- Based on: The Beast by Gabrielle-Suzanne Barbot de Villeneuve
- Voiced by: Robby Benson (1991 film and related project); Dan Stevens (2017 film; voice and motion capture)
- Portrayed by: Terrence Mann (1994 Broadway musical); Jeff Bridges (Disney Dreams Portraits photographs); Dan Payne (Descendants); Dan Stevens (2017 live action film); Chuck Wagner (Broadway); Steve Blanchard (Broadway); Earl Carpenter (West End); Josh Groban (Beauty and the Beast: A 30th Celebration)
- Full name: Prince Adam (merchandise and other select instances only) (Note: The Beast was not given a proper name in the films nor during the original 1991 film's production and is thus not named in any of those works. However, he was given the name "Prince Adam" by the 1998 trivia computer game The D Show; this name has been used in official merchandise of the character and in luxury hotel rooms in Disney's Port Orleans Resort Riverside.)
- Title: Master of the Castle
- Occupation: Prince
- Spouse: Belle
- Children: Prince Ben (son; in Descendants only)
- Relatives: Maurice (father-in-law)
- Nationality: French

The Beast is a fictional character who appears in Walt Disney Animation Studios' animated film Beauty and the Beast (1991), as well as in the film's two direct-to-video followups Beauty and the Beast: The Enchanted Christmas and Belle's Magical World. Based on the character from the French fairy tale, the Beast was created by screenwriter Linda Woolverton and animated by Glen Keane.

A pampered but dangerously grouchy prince transformed into a hideous beast as punishment for his cold-hearted and selfish ways, the Beast must, in order to return to his former self, earn the love of a beautiful young woman named Belle whom he imprisons in his castle. All this must be done before the last petal falls from the enchanted rose on his twenty-first birthday. In all animated film appearances, the Beast is voiced by American actor Robby Benson. The 1991 animated film was adapted into a Broadway musical in 1994, with the role being originated by American actor Terrence Mann. English actor Dan Stevens portrays a live-action version of the character in the 2017 adaptation of the 1991 film.

== Development ==
Determining a suitable appearance for the Beast proved challenging. Although entirely fictional, supervising animator Glen Keane felt it essential for the Beast to resemble a creature that could possibly be found on Earth as opposed to an alien. The initial designs had the Beast as humanoid but with an animal head attached as per the original fairy tale, but soon shifted towards more unconventional forms. The earlier sketches of the Beast's character design are seen as gargoyles and sculptures in the Beast's castle.

Inspired by a buffalo head that he purchased from a taxidermist, Keane decided to base the Beast's appearance on a variety of wild animals, drawing inspiration from the mane of a lion, head of a buffalo, brow of a gorilla, tusks of a wild boar, legs and tail of a wolf, and body of a bear. However, he felt it important that the Beast's eyes remain human. In fear that Glen Keane would design the Beast to resemble voice actor Robby Benson, Walt Disney Studios chairman Jeffrey Katzenberg did not allow Keane to see Benson during production of the film.

== Characteristics ==
The Beast is not of any one species of animal, but a chimera (a mixture of several animals), who would probably be classified as a carnivore overall. He has the head structure and horns of a buffalo, the arms and body of a bear, the eyebrows of a gorilla, the jaws, teeth, and mane of a lion, the tusks of a wild boar, and the legs and tail of a wolf. He also bears resemblance to mythical monsters like the Minotaur or a werewolf. He also has blue eyes, the one physical feature that does not change whether he is a beast or a human.

As opposed to his original counterpart, Disney gave him a more primal nature to his personality and mannerisms, which truly exploited his character as an untamed animal (i.e. alternating between walking and crawling, animal growls). Producer Don Hahn envisioned that the Beast's psychological state has become increasingly feral the longer he was under the curse, such that he would eventually lose his last vestiges of humanity and become completely wild if the spell could not be broken. Hahn's idea doesn't manifest prominently in the finished 1991 animated film, since the Beast is only seen in a brief scene some time after his transformation while much of the narrative starts during the later period of the curse.

In the original tale, the Beast is seen to be kind-hearted for the most part, and gentleman-like, with only an occasional tendency to be hot-tempered. Disney's interpretation of the Beast made him more constantly angry and depressed, due to the shame from his unkind actions which led to his transformation, and particularly his struggle of reconciling his hideous appearance with his inner humanity which made him feel hopeless about breaking the curse. Supervising animator Glen Keane describes The Beast as "a twenty-one-year-old guy who's insecure, wants to be loved, wants to love, but has this ugly exterior and has to overcome this." Upon his reform under his love interest Belle, his personality changes to refined and more even-tempered, while naive about the world at the same time.

To reflect his early personality, the Beast is seen shirtless, with ragged, dark gray breeches, and a ragged reddish-colored cape with a golden colored circular-shaped clasp. Despite the actual color of his cape being a dark reddish color, the Beast's cape is more often referenced to be purple (and in most of the Beast's subsequent appearances after the film, such as The Enchanted Christmas, House of Mouse, or the Kingdom Hearts games, his cape is colored purple). The reason for this change in color is unknown, although the most likely reason is that the color purple is often associated with royalty. After the Beast saves Belle from a pack of wolves, his dress style changes to become more formal and disciplined, reflecting a more refined personality as he attempts to win Belle's friendship and love. His most referenced form of dress is his ballroom outfit, which consisted of a golden vest over a white dress shirt with a white kerchief, black dress pants trimmed with gold, and a royal blue ballroom tail coat trimmed with gold, worn during the film's ballroom dance sequence.

The blue tailcoat outfit is retained after he was restored back to human, which is meant to be a stark contrast to the royal regalia and armor he was depicted in before his curse. His human form is that of a tall and slender young man with auburn hair and soft cream-colored skin while also retaining his bright blue eyes. As a human he is simply known as the "Prince", as supervising animator Glen Keane stated that everyone on the production was too busy to give him an alternative name. However, some licensed works, such as the trivia video game The D Show (1998) have named him "Prince Adam". Disney has come to embrace the name, as seen in multiple pieces of merchandise, as well as a plaque hung up in 2012 (and still hanging there as of 2017) in Walt Disney World's Port Orleans Riverside Royal Rooms that clearly states his name as "Prince Adam." Nevertheless, Disney archivist Dave Smith rejected "Adam" as the Beast's official name.

== Appearances ==
=== Beauty and the Beast ===
The Beast with Belle.

A handsome young prince lives in a luxurious castle in France. He has everything he ever wanted, and as a result, he is spoiled, selfish, and unkind. One night, his heart is put to the test when a beggar woman comes to the castle and asks for shelter from the freezing cold, with a single rose as payment. When he shuns the beggar for her repulsive appearance, she then reveals her true form as a beautiful enchantress. Seeing her beauty and realizing her power, the Prince tries to apologize but she transforms him into a terrifying beast-like creature for his arrogance as punishment. She also casts a spell on the entire castle, transforming it into a dark, foreboding place, its lush green grounds into dangerous immortal wolf-infested woods, and the good-natured servants into anthropomorphic household objects to reflect their different personalities. Ashamed of his new appearance, the Beast conceals himself inside his castle with a magic mirror as his only window to the outside world, and an enchanted rose that would act as the curse's timer which would bloom until he turns 21. If the Beast could learn to love another and earn her love in return before the final petal fell off the rose, the curse would be broken, but if not he would remain a beast forever. The Beast turns to despair as the years pass by, with little hope of achieving this.

As the enchanted rose reaches late bloom and slowly wilts, the first outsider is an old man named Maurice who accidentally stumbles upon the castle, being allowed inside by the servants for shelter. However, the Beast detains Maurice in the tower as a prisoner for trespassing. Maurice's horse returns to the village, and then takes Maurice's daughter Belle back to the castle. In the tower Belle confronts Beast and pleads with him to let her father go, offering herself as a prisoner instead, to which the Beast agrees in return for her promise never to leave. Being prodded by his servants into believing that she is the key to breaking the spell, the Beast shows flashes of compassion for the first time despite his overall gruff manner. For instance, he feels some remorse for ejecting her father without a proper farewell, and as an atonement he lets her stay in a furnished room rather than the tower dungeon and places the servants at her disposal. When she enters the castle's forbidden west wing and nearly touches the rose, he frightens her into fleeing the castle via the woods, which he regrets upon realizing that he lost his temper, then he saves her from being killed by wild wolves. The Beast and Belle come to appreciate each other when she brings him back to the castle and tends to his wounds. He strikes up a friendship with her, by giving her the castle library and learns kindness and manners from her. Eventually, the Beast falls in love with Belle, and placing her happiness before his own, he releases her to tend to her sick father, a decision that disheartens him upon realizing that she had not yet returned his love which means that the curse remains unbroken.

A mob from the village comes to storm the castle and kill the Beast, led by a jealous rival suitor named Gaston. Beast is too miserable from Belle's departure to respond to a challenge from Gaston, although his servants manage to beat back the villagers. Upon seeing Belle's return to the castle, the Beast's mood is roused and he duels Gaston upon the castle rooftops. The Beast uses guile to make up for his lack of weaponry, and remains unfazed by frequent taunts from Gaston, who proclaims that handsome appearance is the entitlement to Belle. The Beast eventually overpowers Gaston and intends to drop him until the hunter begs him not to. Not wanting to sink to Gaston's level of behavior, the Beast decides to show mercy and spare Gaston on the condition that he immediately leave the castle. Belle then shows up on the balcony and the Beast climbs up to meet her; however Gaston refuses to accept defeat and stabs the Beast from behind. Gaston loses his balance and falls from the castle roof to his death, but Belle manages to grab the Beast and pull him up. The Beast, knowing he is mortally wounded, expresses his appreciation to Belle for returning and being able to see her one last time, before falling unconscious and apparently succumbing to his injuries. Belle is able to tell the Beast that she loves him before the final petal falls. Then, Belle's declaration of love for the Beast breaks the spell and transforms him back into the prince. The castle and the servants also return to normal. Later they have a ball to celebrate with the Prince and Belle living happily ever after.

=== Beauty and the Beast: The Enchanted Christmas ===
In this film, which takes place not long after the Beast rescued Belle from the wolves, much to Beast's frustration, Belle wants to celebrate Christmas and throw a real Christmas party. Beast hates the idea of Christmas, for it was the very day almost ten years ago when the Enchantress cast the spell on him and the entire castle. (In contrast to the 1991 animated film where the Prince is depicted in stained-glass windows wearing royal regalia and armor before being cursed, the Prince in Enchanted Christmas is dressed simply in a white shirt and black breeches prior to his transformation.) While Beast sits most of the preparations out, a treacherous servant plots to have Belle thrown out of the castle: Forte the Pipe Organ, since he is far more appreciated by the Beast while under the spell.

Unknown to Beast, Belle writes him a special book which he doesn't see until later on. She also meets Forte later on in a chance meeting. Forte tells her that Beast's favorite Christmas tradition was the Christmas tree. Belle becomes frustrated, for no tree she has seen on the grounds has been tall enough to hang ornaments. Forte lies to Belle, saying that a perfect tree can be found in the woods beyond the castle. Reluctant to go against Beast's orders that she never leave the castle, Belle leaves nonetheless in order to find the perfect tree. When Belle does not arrive to see Beast's Christmas present to her, he begins to suspect that she isn't there at all. When Cogsworth, having been ordered to retrieve Belle, explains that the household cannot find her, Beast becomes enraged. He goes to Forte to ask for advice, and Forte lies that Belle has abandoned him. Beast manages to find Belle and saves her in time from drowning after she fell through thin ice.

Still believing that Belle disobeyed him by breaking her promise not to leave, Beast locks her into the dungeons to rot. But when Forte goads him into destroying the rose to end his suffering, Beast finds Belle's book in the West Wing and reads it, coming to his senses and realizing that all Belle wants is for him to be happy. Releasing Belle from the dungeon and asking for her forgiveness, Beast prepares to join in the Christmas festivities. But Forte doesn't give up and even goes as far as to attempt to destroy the entire castle with Beethoven's 5th. Fortunately, Beast finds him in time and destroys his keyboard with Franz Schubert's Symphony No 8. Losing his balance (and his pipes), Forte falls from the wall he is leaned up against and is silenced forever. Later, the castle and servants are arrayed in Christmas decorations when Belle and the Beast do their famous ballroom dance from the first film.

The story flashes forward to the first Christmas after the spell is broken. The Prince and Belle give Chip, Mrs. Potts' son, a book to read, which he loves. As the Prince and Belle come out to the balcony, he gives her a rose as a gift.

=== Belle's Magical World ===
In the final entry of the franchise, made up of four segments from a presumably failed television series, Belle teaches the Beast a thing or two about life itself, consideration and manners. He appears only in the first and fourth segments, and in a cameo in the third. In the first part, The Perfect Word, Beast and Belle have a bitter falling out at dinner when the Beast demands that Cogsworth open the windows to cool him down, despite the fact that he is the only one hot and there is a cold wind, and angrily strikes his servant, Webster, a long-tongued dictionary. Despite Lumiere and Cogsworth's pleas, Beast refuses to apologise for his behaviour, until Webster, Crane and LePlume forge a letter of apology from the Beast to Belle. All is settled, until the Beast realises that it was a forgery. He furiously banishes Webster, Crane and LePlume from the castle, but Belle brings them back from the woods, and the Beast soon learns to forgive them, as their intentions were good.

In the fourth part, The Broken Wing, the Beast loses his temper with Belle again when she brings an injured bird into the castle, as he dislikes birds. As he tries to chase the bird out, however, he falls over on the stairs and hits his head hard, stripping him of his hatred for birds. However, his selfishness still remains, and he locks the bird in a cage in his room, demanding that it sing for him whenever he demands it. The bird, terrified, refuses, until Belle teaches the Beast that the bird will only sing when happy. The Beast lets the bird out, and learns to consider others before himself.

Earlier on, in the third segment, Mrs. Potts' Party, the Beast makes several cameos sleeping in his bed in the West Wing. Dialogue between Lumiere and Cogsworth shows that he had spent the entire previous night mending leaks in the castle roof and is still resting. An argument between Lumiere and Cogsworth about Mrs. Potts' favourite flowers lead to them having to hide several bunches of flowers around the Beast's bed. At one point, the Beast begins to smell one of the flowers and almost wakes up, but it is removed just in time and he falls asleep again. Mrs. Potts' Party was re-released as part of Belle's Tales of Friendship.

=== Beauty and the Beast (2017 live action film) ===
In March 2015, English actor Dan Stevens was cast as the Beast in a live-action adaptation of the film, which was released on March 17, 2017. The Beast was portrayed with a “more traditional motion capture puppeteering for the body and the physical orientation", where Stevens was "in a forty-pound gray suit on stilts for much of the film". The facial capture for the Beast was done separately order to "communicate the subtleties of the human face" and "[capture the] thought that occurs to him" which gets "through [to] the eyes, which are the last human element in the Beast.” Unlike the original film, the Beast is shown to have a more leonine-like appearance with ram-like horns on his head.

The live-action portrayal closely follows the animated version, but with some differences. Unlike the original 1991 version, where his bad nature is not explained, the 2017 version expands a backstory which reveals that the Prince was a good-natured person whose mother the Queen died of an illness when he was a boy, leaving his cruel, vain, self-centered, and arrogant father the King to raise him. The harsh upbringing caused his cruel nature and he taxed the villagers of his kingdom unjustly. In addition, the curse' length in the live-action adaptation is not mentioned as opposed to the 1991 version wherein its limit would reach by the end of the Beast's twenty-first year.

The Prince was hosting a debutante ball at his castle when a beggar woman appeared at his castle and offered a single rose as payment for shelter from an oncoming storm. The Prince turned her away twice, prompting the beggar to reveal herself to be an enchantress. The Enchantress placed a powerful spell upon the kingdom, turning the Prince into a beast and the servants into animated household objects, while also wiping all memory of the castle from the nearby village's inhabitants. If the Beast was unable to love another and earn that person's love in return, by the time the last petal on the enchanted rose fell, he would remain a beast forever, and in addition his servants would become inanimate antiques.

The live-action version of the Beast is quite civilized in personality and mannerisms, in contrast to the Beast in the animated film which was originally quite primal in behavior. Although the Beast does not seem to have become increasing feral the longer the enchantment runs, in contrast to his animated counterpart from 1991 (reflecting Don Hahn's original intent for the Beast eventually grow wild if he never met Belle), it is his transformed servants who are gradually losing their remaining humanity while the castle deteriorates.

The last rose petal falls before the curse is broken; however, upon seeing Belle profess her love for the Beast, the enchantress reveals herself and lifts the spell on the castle and its inhabitants. Afterward, Prince and Belle host a ball for all the villagers.

== In other media ==
=== Descendants franchise (2015-2021) ===
Beast appears in the Disney Channel musical franchise Descendants. This adaption takes place decades after the 1991 film and unites it with a variety of other Disney fairy tales. In the franchise, Beast is the founder of the United States of Auradon, a collection of different kingdoms of Disney princesses and characters, and was elected to serve as the High King over all kingdoms. He and Belle established the Isle of the Lost, an island that imprisons all Disney villains and eventually their children as well for twenty years.

Beast and Belle are married and have a son, Benjamin Florian, who they pass the crown to in the first film. The franchise follows Ben dismantling the Isle of the Lost to free the children and falling in love with Mal, the daughter of Maleficent. Beast and Belle serve as supporting characters in the original trilogy and the animated short film Descendants: The Royal Wedding.

=== Cameos ===
Beast, along with Belle and Chip, appeared at the 64th Academy Awards as presenters for Best Animated Short Feature.

Beast appeared in the animated television series House of Mouse and its direct-to-video films Mickey's Magical Christmas: Snowed in at the House of Mouse and Mickey's House of Villains.

In 2023, Beast made an appearance in the short, Once Upon a Studio.

=== Stage musical ===
The Beast appears in the Broadway musical adaptation of Disney's Beauty and the Beast, originally portrayed by Terrence Mann. For his performance, Mann received a nomination for the Tony Award for Best Actor in a Musical. Other actors who have taken on the role include Jeff McCarthy (1995-1997, & 2004), Chuck Wagner (1997), James Barbour (1998-1999), and Steve Blanchard (1999-2007).

Alasdair Harvey originated the role on the West End. Other actors who played the role include John Barrowman and Earl Carpenter (who was in the closing cast of the original production), and Shaq Taylor who played the role in the revival. Other notable actors who have taken on the role include Steve Barton and Ethan Freeman who played the role in the original Austrian production in Vienna.

=== Video games ===
==== Kingdom Hearts series ====
Beast appears as a major Disney character in the video game series Kingdom Hearts.

In the first Kingdom Hearts, during a time in which the spell had not yet broken, Beast's home is attacked by the Heartless, led by Maleficent, who take Belle captive. Determined to rescue Belle, Beast exploits the power of darkness and risks his own life to transport himself to Hollow Bastion, where Belle is being held captive with the other six Princesses of Heart. Upon arriving in Hollow Bastion, Beast is confronted by Riku, who challenges him to a duel and easily defeats him. Beast is saved at the last minute by Sora, Donald and Goofy, who are looking for Kairi. Allying himself with Sora, since Donald and Goofy have temporarily joined Riku, Beast fights the Heartless and protects Sora while they work their way into the Hollow Baston castle. Entering the castle, Beast, Sora, Donald and Goofy fight their way through until they encounter and defeat Maleficent, who transforms into her dragon form and challenges them once again, only to be defeated once more. The four heroes find Kairi, but the circumstances cause Sora, Donald, Goofy and Kairi to leave Hollow Bastion, and Beast states that he will not leave without Belle. Later on, Beast encounters Sora once again when he returns to Hollow Bastion to lock the Keyhole. During their second search, Beast and Sora find Belle, who embraces Beast and presents Sora with the Divine Rose Keychain. In the Final Mix version of the game, Beast allies himself with Sora once again to fight and defeat Xemnas (then known as "Unknown").

In Kingdom Hearts: Chain of Memories, Beast is merely a figment of Sora's memories. He is once again separated from Belle, courtesy of Maleficent, but once more, Beast defeats Maleficent with Sora's help and rescues Belle.

In Kingdom Hearts II, after Sora defeats Ansem, all the previously attacked worlds are restored, including Beast's Castle. Afterwards, Beast and Belle return to their home to carry on with their lives. However, the peace is shattered once again when Beast is approached by Xaldin of Organization XIII to do his bidding. Xaldin is determined to manipulate Beast into becoming a Heartless. If that happens, Beast will not only become a strong Heartless which Sora would have to destroy and feed to Kingdom Hearts, but also leave behind a powerful Nobody for Xaldin to use as he wishes (just like what happened to Xehanort). Manipulated and controlled, Beast is forced to allow the Heartless into the castle and lock the entire servant staff in the dungeons, with Belle too scared to intervene. Beast starts mistreating Belle. When Sora, Donald and Goofy arrive, they are encountered by Beast, who attacks them without hesitation. Sora wins the battle, and Beast comes back to his senses thanks to his servants who were released by Sora. Xaldin appears to flee. Later on, during a ball, Xaldin returns and steals the rose, throwing Beast into a depression and causing him to ask Belle and Sora to leave his castle. However a pep talk from Sora spurs him back into action. Xaldin confronts them and sends his Nobodies at them. They fight the Nobodies off, but Xaldin escapes to the castle drawbridge with Belle and the rose. Belle manages to escape from Xaldin's clutches with the rose, and Xaldin is then killed by Beast, Sora, Donald and Goofy. Belle gives Beast the rose but he is more relieved that she wasn't hurt. Beast then bids a grateful farewell to Sora, and returns to a normal life with Belle, until the spell is finally broken and Beast turns back into a human at the end of the game (a scene witnessed during the game's credits following completion). Beast's Limit attack for Kingdom Hearts II is Twin Howl, where he and Sora violently roar together and slash at enemies furiously.

In Kingdom Hearts 358/2 Days, Beast appears along with his homeworld again. The missions in Beast's Castle chronicle some of the events that occurred between Kingdom Hearts and Kingdom Hearts II, such as Belle and Beast attempting to resume their normal lives and Beast's first encounter with Xaldin.

==== Other video games ====
Beast appeared in 2001's video game Disney's Beauty and the Beast Magical Ballroom. He also appeared in Cookie Run Kingdom as a cookie.

Although the film and others never made mention of his real name, the 1998 computer game The D Show said "The Prince's name is Adam."

Beast was included in the video game Disney Magic Kingdoms during a 2017 Event focused on Beauty and the Beast, being a playable character to unlock for a limited time.

An alternate version of Beast appears as a playable character in the video game Disney Mirrorverse.

In 2023 he appeared in Disney Speedstorm and Disney Dreamlight Valley.

== Reception ==
The Beast has generally garnered positive reviews. MsMojo ranked the Beast second in the Top 10 Disney Princes video, praising his character development in the film. Dan Stevens's portrayal of the Beast is also praised. Julia Alexander from Polygon praised Stevens' acting for making the Beast feel real, commenting that "there are moments where you forget the beast isn't real — everything about him feels humane." Dana Schwartz from The Observer is less positive in the Beast's 2017 portrayal. She commented that the Beast's less scary appearance gave lesser impact when he revealed himself to Belle compared to the original. And the fact that the Beast wears a tailcoat and pants all the time makes it unbelievable for certain scenes since the Beast is characterized as "someone who's been an animal for so long he's forgotten how to be human."
