= Cinderella (franchise) =

Disney franchise

Disney's Cinderella
- Logo used for Disney's 2015 live-action film
- Created by: Walt Disney
- Original work: Cinderella (1950)
- Owner: The Walt Disney Company
- Years: 1950–present
- Based on: Cinderella fairy tale

Films and television
- Films: Cinderella (1950; animated); Cinderella (2015; live-action)
- Direct-to-video: Cinderella II: Dreams Come True (2002); Cinderella III: A Twist in Time (2007)

Theatrical presentations
- Musical: Disney's Cinderella KIDS

Games
- Video game: See video games section

Audio
- Soundtrack: Cinderella (first re-released 1997)

Miscellaneous
- Theme park attractions: Cinderella Castle (1971–present, Magic Kingdom; 1983–present, Tokyo Disneyland); Prince Charming Regal Carrousel (1971–present); L'Auberge de Cendrillon (1992–present)

Cinderella is a Disney franchise that commenced in 1950 with the theatrical release of the 1950 film Cinderella. The franchise's protagonist is the titular character Cinderella, who was based on the character of the same name from the Cinderella fairy tale.

== Overview ==
MCNG Marketing wrote "Cinderella alone is a brand that is easily worth hundreds of million of "bippity boppity" dollars." The blog Fragments said "Cinderella seems to be the main princess in the Disney Princess franchise–there are 108 items for Cinderella on DisneyStore.com ... Cinderella is the alpha-princess of the Disney Princess franchise, which seems a bit odd since she is from the second-oldest film that is included in the franchise."

The paper Saving Cinderella: From Disney to Cyborg Princess examines why Cinderella is such an enduring franchise:

For many little girls, Cinderella is synonymous with "Disney Princess" – that astronomically successful franchise in which eleven young ladies become Princess. Not only is she beautiful, but her transformation – from pauper to princess (albeit courtesy of a fairy godmother) – makes her ever so real: if Cinderella can make such a transformation, so might I. However, Cinderella’s transformation is not limited to this ‘becoming-princess’; her transition is also about growing up, and in this way, it is a narrative of feminine identity. It is about, in Cinderella’s case, taking on the identity of Princess, a particular version of femininity.

== Animated feature films ==
=== Cinderella (1950) ===
Cinderella is a 1950 American animated romantic musical fantasy film produced by Walt Disney and released by RKO Radio Pictures. Based on the fairy tale Cendrillon by Charles Perrault, it was released on February 15, 1950. The film was directed by Clyde Geronimi, Hamilton Luske and Wilfred Jackson. The songs were written by Mack David, Jerry Livingston, and Al Hoffman; they include "A Dream Is a Wish Your Heart Makes", "Bibbidi-Bobbidi-Boo", "So This Is Love", "The Work Song" and "Sing, Sweet Nightingale". In 2018, Cinderella was selected for preservation in the United States National Film Registry by the Library of Congress as being "culturally, historically, or aesthetically significant".

The story follows Cinderella's stepmother and two stepsisters forcing Cinderella to work as a maid, preventing her from attending the royal ball. When her fairy godmother appears and magically transforms the world around Cinderella according to her desires, Cinderella seduces Prince Charming at the ball. However, she is in a race against the clock, as she needs to hurry home before the spell wears off, and her stepmother and sisters punish her.

=== Cinderella II: Dreams Come True ===
Cinderella II: Dreams Come True is a 2002 American animated romantic musical fantasy film, the first direct-to-video sequel to the 1950 American romantic musical film Cinderella. It was released on February 26, 2002. It was followed by Cinderella III: A Twist in Time in 2007. It consists of three segments featuring Cinderella planning a party, Jaq the mouse being turned into a human and living as Cinderella's page boy, and one of Cinderella's brutal stepsisters (Anastasia, the redheaded one in a pink dress) reaching her redemption through falling in love with a young baker, a low-class man of whom Lady Tremaine and Drizella do not approve. Estimated to cost $5 million, Cinderella II: Dreams Come True was Walt Disney Pictures' top selling animated sequel that year, grossing approximately $120 million in direct-to-video sales. The film received negative reviews. This is the only film with opposite reception.

Cinderella prepares for her first royal ball and tries to help her stepsister find love.

=== Cinderella III: A Twist in Time ===
Cinderella III: A Twist in Time is a 2007 American animated musical fantasy film, the second direct-to-video sequel to the 1950 American romantic musical film Cinderella. Canonically it is a continuation of the original Cinderella, rather than Cinderella II: Dreams Come True, instead this film was set in between the first and second films, though due to its unusual chronological sequencing it acknowledges the events of Cinderella II: Dreams Come True by using some of its characters. The film was released on February 6, 2007, directed by Frank Nissen and features the voices of Jennifer Hale and Susanne Blakeslee. For the UK release of the film, it was simply titled "Cinderella: A Twist in Time", without mention of it being a sequel. It made its world television premiere on Toon Disney on December 3, 2007. The film received generally positive reviews (the first film received more positive reception than the third film, but the second film received contrasting reviews).

On the first anniversary of Cinderella's marriage to Prince Charming, her stepsister Anastasia finds the Fairy Godmother's wand in the forest. Cinderella's cruel stepmother, Lady Tremaine, uses it to reverse time, making the famous glass slipper fit Anastasia's foot before Cinderella has a chance to try it on. But, no longer retaining any memory of who Cinderella is, the prince prepares to marry Anastasia, and Cinderella is forced to jump into action to regain her happy ending.

== Live-action remake ==
Cinderella is an American romantic fantasy film directed by Kenneth Branagh from a screenplay written by Aline Brosh McKenna and Chris Weitz. Produced by David Barron and Simon Kinberg for Walt Disney Pictures, the film is inspired by the folk tale Cinderella by Charles Perrault and the 1950 American romantic musical film of the same name. It stars Lily James as the titular character, Cate Blanchett as Lady Tremaine, Richard Madden as Prince Kit, Sophie McShera as Drisella Tremaine, Holliday Grainger as Anastasia Tremaine and Helena Bonham Carter as The Fairy Godmother. Principal photography on the film began on September 23, 2013 in London. The film was released on March 13, 2015.

After her father unexpectedly dies, young Ella finds herself at the mercy of her cruel stepmother and two stepsisters, who reduce her to scullery maid. Despite her circumstances, she refuses to despair. An invitation to a palace ball gives Ella hope that she might reunite with the dashing stranger she met in the woods, but her stepmother prevents her from going. Help arrives in the form of a kindly beggar woman who has a magic touch for very ordinary things.

== Cast and characters ==
List indicators

This section includes characters who will appear or have appeared in the franchise.

- An empty grey cell indicates the character was not in the film, or that the character's official presence has not yet been confirmed.
- ^{Y} indicates a younger version of the character.
- ^{S} indicates an appearance as a character's singing voice.

Characters	Animated films			Live-action film
Characters	Cinderella	Cinderella II: Dreams Come True	Cinderella III: A Twist in Time	Cinderella
Characters	1950	2002	2007	2015
Cinderella	Ilene Woods	Jennifer Hale	Jennifer Hale Tami Tappa^{S}	Lily James
Lady Tremaine	Eleanor Audley	Susanne Blakeslee	Susanne Blakeslee	Cate Blanchett
Fairy Godmother	Verna Felton	Russi Taylor	Russi Taylor	Helena Bonham Carter
Anastasia Tremaine	Lucille Bliss	Tress MacNeille	Tress MacNeille	Holliday Grainger
Drizella Tremaine	Rhoda Williams	Russi Taylor	Russi Taylor	Sophie McShera
Jaq	Jimmy MacDonald	Rob Paulsen	Rob Paulsen	Character is mute
Gus	Jimmy MacDonald	Corey Burton	Corey Burton	Character is mute
The King	Luis van Rooten	Andre Stojka	Andre Stojka	Derek Jacobi
The Grand Duke	Luis van Rooten	Rob Paulsen	Rob Paulsen	Stellan Skarsgård
Prince Charming	William Edward Phipps Mike Douglas^{S}	Christopher Daniel Barnes	Christopher Daniel Barnes	Richard Madden
Lucifer	June Foray	Frank Welker	Frank Welker	Animal sounds only
Bruno	Jimmy MacDonald	Frank Welker		
Perla	Lucille Williams	Silent cameo		
Suzy	Maria Kawamura	Silent cameo		
Mary	Silent cameo	Russi Taylor		
Narrator	Betty Lou Gerson			Helena Bonham Carter
Prudence		Holland Taylor	Holland Taylor	
The Baker		Rob Paulsen	Silent cameo	
Pom-Pom		Frank Welker		
The Captain				Nonso Anozie
Cinderella's father	Silent cameo			Ben Chaplin
Cinderella's mother				Hayley Atwell

== Theme park attractions ==
=== Cinderella Castle ===
Cinderella Castle is the fairy tale castle at the center of two Disney theme parks: the Magic Kingdom at the Walt Disney World Resort, and Tokyo Disneyland at the Tokyo Disney Resort. Both serve as worldwide recognized icons and the flagship attraction for their respective theme parks. Along with Sleeping Beauty Castle, the Castle is an iconic symbol of The Walt Disney Company as a whole.

=== Prince Charming Regal Carrousel ===
Prince Charming Regal Carrousel (formerly Cinderella's Golden Carrousel) is an authentic carousel ride in the Magic Kingdom at Walt Disney World Resort. Similar attractions under varying names can be found at two other Disney parks, including Tokyo Disneyland and Hong Kong Disneyland. This 90-horse carousel plays organ-based Disney songs during the two-minute ride period. Hand-painted scenes from Disney's Cinderella can be seen on the ride; hence the name "Prince Charming".

=== L'Auberge de Cendrillon ===
L'Auberge de Cendrillon (French for Cinderella's Inn) is a restaurant located in Fantasyland in Disneyland Paris, which opened in 1992 with the park. It is themed to the Disney movie Cinderella.

=== Cinderella Castle Suite ===
A suite, which can be compared to the size of a master bedroom and bathroom in an average house, exists inside the upper levels of Cinderella Castle.

=== Cinderella's Royal Table ===
Cinderella's Royal Table is a restaurant "event" held daily within the Cinderella Castle's upper level at Disney World, Florida. While lunches are sometimes available, the primary meal served is Dinner. Reserved Guests are admitted to a waiting alcove before proceeding to a French-styled eating area with a number of coves, tables, and various Baroque props and chandeliers. Menus are provided for ordering a number of entrees, all of which are typically found in mid to upper level dining restaurants (beef and chicken tend to dominate). During the dinner, the Cinderella characters (usually Cinderella, Prince Charming and the Godmother) will circulate with and briefly chat with the guests, often posing for pictures. Reservations are required, and over the years wait times have ranged from two days to (for dinner) nearly 6 months.

=== Cinderella's Fairy Tale Hall ===
In Tokyo Disneyland, Cinderella Castle contains a walk-through attraction. At the lobby and corridor, guests will find eight murals showing how Cinderella changed from beloved daughter, to servant girl, and then to Princess. They will also see a diorama of Cinderella magically transformed into wearing a beautiful ball gown, and other artworks made from various materials such as paper, wood and glass. In the Grand Hall guests will find a magnificent chandelier, the renowned glass slipper, a throne, and special paintings that reveal a magical message when photographed using a flash.

== Stage musical ==
=== Disney's Cinderella KIDS ===
Disney's Cinderella KIDS is a scaled-down stage musical version of the film known as Disney's Cinderella KIDS is frequently performed by schools and children's theaters.

== Video games ==
=== Cinderella: Magical Dreams ===
Cinderella: Magical Dreams is a video game based on the film of the same name. The game was released September 20, 2005.

=== Cinderella's Dollhouse ===
Disney's Cinderella Dollhouse is a point-and-click computer game released by Disney Interactive in 2000.

=== Cinderella Dollhouse 2 ===
Cinderella Dollhouse 2 is a point-and-click computer game released by Disney Interactive in 2000.

=== Cinderella's Castle Designer ===
Cinderella's Castle Designer is computer game that allows players to build the castles from 1950's Cinderella.

=== Disney Princess games ===
Because Cinderella is a Disney Princess, there is an overlap between the Cinderella and Princess franchises. Disney Princess: Enchanting Storybooks is a video game based on the Disney Princess franchise, developed and published by THQ and was released for the Nintendo Wii and Nintendo DS on November 8, 2011. Disney Princess Cinderella is a 2003 adventure video game developed by Art Co., Ltd for the Game Boy Advance. The game has the princesses completing several levels. Disney Princess: Enchanted Journey is a 2007 video game released for PlayStation 2, Wii and PC.

=== Kingdom Hearts series ===
Cinderella and Fairy Godmother appear in the first Kingdom Hearts video game. A world based on the film, Castle of Dreams, appears in Kingdom Hearts Birth by Sleep, in addition to them two also appearing Jaq, Lucifer, Prince Charming, Lady Tremaine, Anastasia, Drizella and the Grand Duke. Fairy Godmother returns in the Kingdom Hearts III DLC Kingdom Hearts III Re Mind, and in Kingdom Hearts: Melody of Memory.

=== Disney Magic Kingdoms ===
Cinderella, Prince Charming, Fairy Godmother, Lady Tremaine, Anastasia and Drizella appear as playable characters in the video game Disney Magic Kingdoms.

== Music ==
=== Soundtrack ===
There was an original soundtrack album with the film's release in 1950. The revised soundtrack for Cinderella was first released by Walt Disney Records on February 4, 1997 and included a bonus demo. On October 4, 2005 Disney released a special edition of the soundtrack album of Cinderella, for the Platinum Edition DVD release, which includes several demo songs cut from the final film, a new song, and a cover version of "A Dream is a Wish Your Heart Makes".
