= Kilala Princess =

Manga

Disney's きらら☆プリンセス (Dizunii Kirara Purinsesu)
- Genre: Fantasy, adventure
- Manga
- Written by: Rika Tanaka
- Illustrated by: Nao Kodaka
- Published by: Kodansha
- English publisher: NA: Tokyopop
- Magazine: Nakayoshi
- Original run: 2005 – 2008
- Volumes: 5

Kilala Princess, known in Japan as Disney's Kirara Princess, (Note: Japanese: Disney's きらら☆プリンセス, Hepburn: Dizunii Kirara Purinsesu) is a shōjo fantasy, romance, and adventure manga series written by Rika Tanaka and illustrated by Nao Kodaka. The first 15 chapters were serialized by Kōdansha in the monthly manga magazine Nakayoshi, while the last 8 chapters were serialized in the quarterly Nakayoshi Lovely. It was later collected in five bound volumes (volumes 1–3 containing the Nakayoshi chapters and volumes 4–5 containing the Nakayoshi Lovely chapters). It is about a young girl named Kilala and a lost Prince named Rei who join to find the "7th Princess" and save the kingdom of Paradiso. However, Kilala is not mentioned as a relevant member of the princesses in other later media.

== History and Publication ==
The series is licensed in English by Tokyopop in North America and Chuang Yi in Singapore. The first volume in English was printed in January 2007. Tokyopop has released Volume 1 and 2, but has split them into "Manga Minis," meaning the two volumes were split into four. Tokyopop's Volume 4 was released in December 2007 and no further volumes have been released since.

Tokyopop's license to Kilala Princess expired for a time, but they have since reclaimed the series and rerelease began in July 2016. Kilala Princess 2 began in July 2019.

== Plot ==
Kilala Reno is a young girl who fancies Disney, specifically the Disney Princesses. She dreams to meet her 'Prince Charming' and have a happy ending, like the Disney Princesses. Her story is about how she meets her prince, saves the Kingdom of Paradiso and ultimately, through hardship, becomes a Princess herself.

=== Volume 1 ===
This is Volume 1 and 2 of the Tokyopop release

One day after school, a young girl named Kilala Reno stumbles across a boy sleeping in her yard. After thinking to herself, he looks like a Prince, she tries to kiss him, thinking it will wake him up, just like a kiss wakes up Sleeping Beauty. He does wake up, but only to fall back asleep again. Kilala then carries him inside her house and watches over him sleeping, as she wonders who he is and where he came from. As she folds his coat, a small tiara falls out, which she tries on. To her surprise, she feels just like one of the Disney Princesses. Then, Rei wakes up and accuses her of stealing the tiara. She calls him the Thief instead, questioning how she would know if he didn't steal it first. Rei's servant, Valdou, runs in and unintentionally breaks up the fight.

Valdou explains that Rei and he are searching for the Seventh Princess and the rightful owner of that tiara. There is a legend that the Princess can save their country from turmoil. Kilala tells them she knows where they can find a princess and leads them to a Princess Contest where her best friend, Erika, had just won. Certain that Erika was the Princess they were looking for, she goes to find her only to watch as strange men in long coats kidnap her and throw her in the back seat of a car. Kilala goes after her, but is almost injured by the mysterious men before Rei comes and saves her.

Rei and Kilala come upon a strange gated door called the "Gate of Dreams." The Tiara starts to glow and Kilala places it on her head, praying that the door leads the way to save Erika. However, when the two wake up, they suddenly find themselves in the world of Snow White and the Seven Dwarfs, where they meet Snow White in person. The two of them become dwarfs. After some introductions, Kilala realizes how to find a way to find Erika and the two make their way to the Magic Mirror, summoning it. The Mirror tells them the Tiara will show them the way if they can survive the danger ahead. Before Kilala can ask what the danger is, they are attacked by the Evil Queen, who demands the Tiara. They try to escape but are ultimately captured when they are attacked by dogs, badly injuring Rei.

The Queen turns into an old lady and tries to force Kilala to eat a poison apple, making the dogs hold down Rei. Snow White appears and tells The Queen that, to save Kilala, she will eat the apple instead. Just before she can, however, Kilala knocks the apple out of her hand telling The Queen no one will be eating that apple and the Seven Dwarfs appear. They are all able to attack the Queen, pushing her into a Cauldron which turns her into a vulture. Afterwards, Snow White gives Kilala a ruby, which attaches itself to the Tiara and changes her and Rei back to normal. The Gate reappears and the two leave Snow White's world, following the light back to their world, which leads them to Erika. Rei questions why they would leave her behind, but then realizes it must be because she is not the Seventh Princess.

The next day, everything returned to normal for Kilala. She goes to visit the gate but finds it just won't open anymore. She reminisces on her journey and blushes as she realizes she has feelings for Rei, who appears next to her. Before she can tell him her feelings, he tells her he's leaving for other countries to continue his search for the Seventh Princess. Realizing she can't be selfish and ask him to stay, she wishes him a safe journey and, heartbroken walks away.

Later that night, she goes to the Princess Contest Afterparty to support Erica. She starts to feel lonely without a partner before a dress but Rei shows up asking her for a dance. She comments she doesn't have a dress and doesn't know how to dance, to which he replies by saying he's dressed in his normal clothes too and doesn't know how to dance either. The two dance in the garden outside as crowds begins to gather to watch them. Kilala thinks to herself that it feels like she's dancing with a real Prince. She asks for time to stop on this moment forever.

The volume ends with Kilala crying in Rei's arms, knowing Rei will have to leave her and Erika, hypnotized by the mysterious men from before, stealing the Tiara.

=== Volume 2 ===
This is Volume 3 and 4 of the Tokyopop release

Kilala rescues Erika before the unnamed villains can kill her, and sneaks up to their boat where she steals back the Tiara before falling into the ocean. Kilala and Rei go to the world of The Little Mermaid. Unlike their trip to Snow White's world, however, they retain their true clothes but are able to breathe underwater. Ariel, Flounder, Spot, Sebastian and Scuttle help Kilala find a sick Rei. While Kilala and Ariel set off to find white crown seaweed to cure Rei, he is later captured by Ursula who intends to marry him and become a Queen. Kilala sets off to find Ursula's lair. Ursula tells her that Rei is really a Prince and should marry a suitable bride. An injured Flounder tells Ariel of Kilala and Rei's situation; Ariel then attempts to make her way to Kilala, but Flounder collapses out of exhaustion. Ariel then remembers what she'd learned about love, and sang to encourage Kilala to fight further. With encouragement from Ariel's song, Kilala defeats Ursula with the Tiara. She questions Rei about his identity as a prince and he confirms that he is a Prince of somewhere he can't remember, but he is still himself. Ariel gives Kilala an aquamarine gemstone as a token of their friendship, which turns out to be one of the magic gems to be acquired by the Tiara. Kilala's parents come home from Paradiso after their long absence, only to tell Kilala that the kingdom is under attack and they barely got out. This makes Rei remember that he is actually the Prince of Paradiso and questions why he couldn't remember something so important before. He gives Kilala the Tiara and promises to return for it soon. He leaves on a ship back to Paradiso.

The Volume ends with Kilala's mother telling her she has what it takes to become a true princess and urges Kilala to find a way to Paradiso to help Rei's country.

=== Volume 3 ===
Kilala travels to a new city to locate a professor, only to find that he's dead. She comes across a little girl, Mill, who's being bullied by teenagers accusing her of believing in fairies. Kilala tries to defend her but ends up getting the book dirty, and Mill blames her for it. Later, however, Mill returns to thank her for the aid. As they talk about believing in fairies, Tinker Bell appears and lures them to an ancient library. There, Kilala finds a journal containing information about the Seventh Princess. Rei finds out Valdou is the leader of the Coup, the people responsible for attacking the kingdom of Paradiso. Rei is held captive as Valdou goes after the Tiara. Kilala enters a Princess Cinderella contest, only to fail every single test and humiliates herself. She runs away in tears before running into Valdou, who "takes" her to Rei. Rei escapes Valdou's capture and finds Kilala.

Upon getting shot in the back, Kilala's consciousness travels to the world of Cinderella. She helps Cinderella finish her chores to get her on time for the royal ball, but Drizella and Anastasia continue to make a mess to make them work. Jaq and Gus make a dress for Cinderella while Kilala secretly finishes the chores. Cinderella also teaches her the proper ways of eating, walking, singing and dancing like a princess. Anastasia steals her Tiara during a confrontation and decides to use it to brainwash the prince. After the Fairy Godmother helped Cinderella to the ball, Kilala asks for her help. At the ball, she knocks down Drizella before she can hypnotize the prince and sends the Tiara flying out the balcony. Just then, Cinderella arrives and the dance goes smoothly as ever. Kilala finds the Tiara broken and shattered. The Fairy Godmother appears and restores it, with a new gem added to it: a white diamond, given by Cinderella. When Kilala returns to the human world, her body is healed. She and Rei are then captured and taken to a devastated Paradiso. Kilala is thrown into an Internment Camp and Rei is taken to be brainwashed and forced to help the Coup. Kilala saves him before they can and the two declare their feelings for one another.

The Volume ends with Kilala and Rei walking towards the Paradiso gate, determined to collect all the remaining gems and save the country.

=== Volume 4 ===
Kilala and Rei fall into the world of Beauty and the Beast, followed by Rei's old fiancée Sylphy, the obnoxious and self-busy princess of Floradiso. They accidentally lose the Beast's pocket watch in the river and follow the current to the village to get it back. After finding out that the watch is in Gaston's hands, Rei starts a fight with the bulky man only to lose. Gaston throws the watch back to them but keeps the amber stored inside. Kilala and Sylphy pose as dancers to steal back the jewel. Rei starts a fight with Gaston again, and wins, along with the gem. Kilala convinces the Beast to confess his feelings to Belle and give her the broken pocket watch, which she happily accepts. As a token, Belle and Beast give Kilala the amber, only to find out that it's one of the gems needed for the Tiara.

The Tiara immediately brings them to the World of Sleeping Beauty. The three fairies, Flora, Fauna and Merryweather, provide gowns and outfits for the trio, but Kilala's dress turns into that of a maid and is forced to work at the castle's party for Princess Aurora's 17th birthday. Kilala helps Prince Phillip's little cousin find a glass bead. When they do find it, the little princess gives it to her as a token for her help. Sylphy laughs at Kilala for being naïve and unsuitable to be a real princess. Princess Aurora finds Kilala on the balcony and tells her to keep on believing in herself and her love for Rei. Maleficent appears (disguised as Malecent) and attempts to curse Aurora with magic rose thorns. Kilala shields the princess and falls under the spell. Rei breaks Maleficent's magic with true love's kiss. Right after Maleficent is defeated, the glass bead turns into rose quartz and joins with the Tiara.

When they return to Paradiso, it's in more ruin than when they left. Sylphy shows herself to also be a traitor, siding with Valdou in agreement that he will make Rei marry her. They run away but are ultimately saved by Sylphy, who has regretted joining with Valdou by Kilala's persuasion. They race off on an air vehicle. The Volume ends with Sylphy, Rei and Kilala being shot out of the sky by Valdou.

=== Volume 5 ===
Kilala, Rei and Sylphy visit the world of Aladdin and land on Aladdin and Princess Jasmine's magic carpet before falling into the ocean. On their way back to Agrabah, the guards of the palace appear under Jafar's orders to arrest Aladdin, Kilala, Rei and Sylphy. While Rei and Aladdin hold off the guards, the girls make their way to escape. Jasmine falls off the roof trying to help Sylphy and ends up captured by Valdou, who has also followed them to this world and sided with Jafar. Sylphy tries to use the lamp to first make Rei fall in love with her (which is denied) and later to find Jasmine, but Valdou steals the lamp before she can summon Genie again. He wishes to return to Paradiso and become its ruler. As he fades away, Kilala steals back the lamp and wishes to find Jasmine.

After the tension, Aladdin wishes the princess good night. Kilala immediately remembers Aladdin's capture, but it is too late. The Sultan gives Kilala a huge diamond as a token for being Jasmine's first friend. Jafar turns into Sylphy after she left and attempts to steal the diamond, but Kilala and Rei figure him out. Kilala returns the diamond and Jasmine gives her a flower given to her by Aladdin as a token of their friendship. Angered, Jafar has Iago steal the flower and take it far off the desert. They find a nearly drowned Aladdin and Genie. Sylphy steals the lamp again and wishes to find the flower. It changes into the sixth gem: an amethyst.

Kilala, now the Seventh Princess, restores Paradiso to the way it was before, along with the people who have been brainwashed. Rei gathers the townsmen and women to fight against Valdou and his Coup to protect Paradiso. Valdou creates a powerful blast and sets the village on fire. Kilala runs into a church to save the children trapped inside. Grief-stricken by her sacrifice, Rei fills his weapon with the power of love and defeats Valdou once and for all, further ending the fire in the village. Kilala survives.

Now married to Rei and becoming a true princess, Kilala takes on the new road of learning to become a proper princess. Rei sets sail to end serious problems caused by Valdou in other countries. Kilala helps create a school for the children who have lost their parents, despite everyone else's protests. Having chosen her way of life as a princess, the final gem appears on the Tiara: an emerald. Rei returns to Paradiso.

And they lived happily ever after.

== Characters ==
=== Major characters ===
Kilala Reno (きらら・リーノ, Kirara Rīno)
The heroine of the story, Kilala is a cheerful and energetic teenage girl who is a big fan of Disney characters, especially the Disney Princesses. Kilala hopes to become like them someday, but her clumsy and spunky attitude puts her very behind. She is in a different place from her parents and wishes to meet them again someday. Her best friend is Erica and her pet is Tippe. She newly holds the power of the princesses after awakening Rei, who she later falls in love with. She is enthusiastic about the world she is traveling in but cares much more about her best friend's well-being. Kilala has things in common with otaku, a Japanese term for anyone who is obsessed with entertainment, or in Kilala's case, Disney works. Although this obsession seems useless in the real world, it comes to her aid in travelling in the Disney world.
Halfway through the series, Kilala experiences a hairstyle change thanks to her mother. Her hair is thinner and longer, contrasting her thick hair before. Kilala's three curls are looser, and the braid at the back is replaced with red beads.
Rei (レイ)
The male protagonist of the story, Rei is a stubborn, headstrong, but well-intentioned prince who has come to Kilala's town to search for the princess of his country, Paradiso (パラディソス Paradisosu (Paradeisos)). Kilala tried to kiss him because she first found him asleep, and to her embarrassment, Rei remembers that event quite clearly. Kilala later finds out he's a prince. And the two fall in love with each other. Later on in the story, Rei must go back to Paradiso and gives Kilala the tiara of the seventh princess. He finds out later that his memories were erased by Valdou and the Coup, who are trying to take over his country.
Tippe (ティッピ, Tippi)
Kilala's pet female Flying Mouse. Tippe is pink and has a ribbon on her back. In Volume 2, Tippe begins to talk and it surprises Kilala and Rei. She only talks when she is inside a Disney Princess' world.
Valdou (バルドー, Barudō)
Rei's bodyguard, and is also searching for the Legendary Princess along with Rei. Valdou is later an antagonist revealed to wanting to rule Paradiso with his humanoids in place of humans, a species which he considers worthless and unproductive due to their "unnecessary" emotions.
Erica (エリカ, Erika)
A supporting character in the story, Erica is Kilala's best friend and a model student in her school. Erika is very friendly, cute, and kind, she is very much like a princess. After she is crowned princess at the 'Princess Contest', she is kidnapped by two cloaked men (later revealed to be humanoids) and it is up to Kilala and her newfound companions to retrieve her. Soon after Kilala and Rei's adventure in Snow White's world, the duo find Erica, but she's behaving quite abnormally and even tries to steal the tiara of the seventh princess because the men hypnotized Erica to steal the tiara for them. In volume 2, it is revealed that she is not the seventh princess.
Sylphy (シルフィ, Shirufi)
The beautiful princess of Floradiso and Kilala's rival. She claims to be Rei's fiancee, though this is hinted to be unofficial. Sylphy is the exact opposite of Kilala: superficial, inconsiderate, and obnoxious, but she possesses a good heart underneath her cold attitude. She lets Rei and Kilala be together after learning compassion and becoming attached to Kilala.
Disney Princesses
6 accomplished, kind-hearted, and beautiful princesses from famous Disney works, are Kilala's idols because of her wishes of finding a Prince Charming and living a life of luxury. These princesses are Belle, Aurora, Cinderella, Ariel, Snow White, and Jasmine.

=== Minor characters ===
Kilala's Parents
Kenta
A guy who harbors a crush on Erica. Kenta even went to The Annual Princess After-party. He and Kilala sometimes make fun of each other. It is possible that he is dating Erica.
The Seven Dwarfs
The Evil Queen
Flounder
Sebastian
Prince Eric
King Triton
Spot
Ursula
Flotsam and Jetsam
Mill
A girl who believes in fairies. She met Kilala when she was bullied for reading books on fairies and stopped believing, after talking to Kilala, she believes in fairies again and a fairy came to help Kilala
Jaq and Gus
Lady Tremaine
Anastasia and Drizella Tremaine
Tinker Bell
Beast
Gaston
Lumière
Mrs. Potts
Cogsworth
Chip
LeFou
Footstool
Flora, Fauna, and Merryweather
Maleficent
Aladdin
Abu
Genie
Magic Carpet
Jafar
Iago
The Sultan
