= Music of Cinderella (1950 film) =

Soundtracks to the 1950 film Cinderella

The music for the 1950 animated musical fantasy film Cinderella produced by Walt Disney Productions, featured original songs written and composed by Mack David, Jerry Livingston, and Al Hoffman, along with incidental underscore provided by Oliver Wallace and Paul Smith. The songs were recorded by Ilene Woods, Rhoda Williams, Mike Douglas, Verna Felton amongst others.

A soundtrack was not issued during the initial theatrical release. Later, an original soundtrack was released in 1997 under Walt Disney Records label, featuring score cues and songs. A collector's edition was later released on October 2012, that included lost chords and new recordings.

== Background ==
In 1946, story artist and part-time lyricist Larry Morey joined studio music director Charles Wolcott to compose the songs. Cinderella would sing three songs: "Sing a Little, Dream a Little" while overloaded with work, "The Mouse Song" as she dressed the mice, and "The Dress My Mother Wore" as she fantasizes about her mother's old wedding dress. To recycle an unused fantasy sequence from Snow White, the song, "Dancing on a Cloud" was used as Cinderella and the Prince waltz during the ball. After the ball, she would sing "I Lost My Heart at the Ball" and the Prince would sing "The Face That I See in the Night." However, none of their songs were used.

Two years later, Disney turned to Tin Pan Alley songwriters Mack David, Jerry Livingston, and Al Hoffman to compose the songs. They were the first professional composers to be hired outside the production company. The trio had previously written the song "Chi-Baba, Chi-Baba" that Disney heard on the radio and decided would work well with the Fairy Godmother sequence. They finished the songs in March 1949. In total six songs were performed in the film: "Cinderella", "A Dream Is a Wish Your Heart Makes", "Oh, Sing Sweet Nightingale", "The Work Song", "Bibbidi-Bobbidi-Boo", and "So This Is Love".

Oliver Wallace and Paul Smith composed the score, but only after the animation was ready for inking, which was incidentally similar to scoring a live-action film. This was a drastic change from the earlier Disney animated features in which the music and action were carefully synchronized in a process known as Mickey Mousing. The film also marked the launching of the Walt Disney Music Company. The soundtrack was also a first in using multi-tracks for vocals – with the song "Oh, Sing Sweet Nightingale", Ilene Woods recorded a second and third vocal track to enable her to sing harmony with herself.

== Release history ==
=== 1950 album ===
On February 4, 1950, Billboard announced that RCA Records and Disney would release a children's album in conjunction with the theatrical release. The RCA Victor album release sold about 750,000 copies during its first release and hit number-one on the Billboard pop charts.

=== 1995 album ===
On September 12, 1995, a special edition of the soundtrack entitled Walt Disney Records Presents The Music of Cinderella was released to coincide with the film's re-release on home video. The album opened with cover versions of the songs from the film including Linda Ronstadt singing "A Dream is a Wish Your Heart Makes" in English and Spanish, Take 6 singing "The Work Song", James Ingram singing "So This Is Love", David Benoit and David Sanborn performing a jazz medley from the film, and Bobby McFerrin's take on "Bibbidi-Bobbidi-Boo".

=== 1997 album ===
The soundtrack for Cinderella was released by Walt Disney Records on CD and audio cassette on February 4, 1997, and included a bonus demo. On October 4, 2005, Disney released a special edition of the soundtrack album of Cinderella, for the Platinum Edition DVD release, which includes several demo songs cut from the final film, a new song, and a cover version of "A Dream is a Wish Your Heart Makes". The soundtrack was released again on October 2, 2012, and consisted of several lost chords and new recordings of them. A Walmart exclusive limited edition "Music Box Set" consisting of the soundtrack without the lost chords or bonus demos, the Song and Story: Cinderella CD and a bonus DVD of Tangled Ever After was released on the same day.

=== 2015 album ===
In conjunction with the film's 65th anniversary and the release of its live-action remake, the soundtrack for Cinderella was re-released in 2015 as part of the Legacy Collection.

== Track listing ==
=== 1997 original track list ===
Walt Disney's Cinderella: Original Motion Picture Soundtrack

Soundtrack album by Various artists
- Released: February 4, 1997
- Length: 44:33
- Label: Walt Disney

No.	Title	Artist(s)	Length
1.	"Main Title / Cinderella"	Marni Nixon; The Jud Conlon Chorus	2:51
2.	"A Dream Is a Wish Your Heart Makes"	Ilene Woods	4:34
3.	"A Visitor / Caught in a Trap / Lucifer / Feed the Chickens / Breakfast Is Served / Time on Our Hands"		2:10
4.	"The King's Plan"		1:22
5.	"The Music Lesson / Oh, Sing Sweet Nightengale / Bad Boy Lucifer / A Message from His Majesty"	Woods; Rhoda Williams	2:06
6.	"Little Dressmakers / The Work Song / Scavenger Hunt / A Dream Is a Wish Your Heart Makes / The Dress / My Beads / Escape to the Garden"	Mice Chorus	9:24
7.	"Where Did I Put That Thing / Bibbidi-Bobbidi-Boo"	Verna Felton	4:47
8.	"Reception at the Palace / So This Is Love"	Woods; Mike Douglas	5:44
9.	"The Stroke of Midnight / Thank You Fairy Godmother"		2:05
10.	"Locked in the Tower / Gus and Jaq to the Rescue / Slipper Fittings / Cinderella's Slipper / Finale"		7:36
11.	"I'm in the Middle of a Muddle" (Demo Recording) (CD version only)		1:54
Total length:			44:33

=== 2012 collectors edition ===
Cinderella: Collector's Edition

Soundtrack album by Various artists
- Released: October 2, 2012
- Length: 78:26
- Label: Walt Disney

No.	Title	Artist(s)	Length
1.	"Main Title"	Nixon; Jud Conlon Chorus	2:51
2.	"A Dream Is A Wish Your Heart Makes"	Woods	4:34
3.	"A Visitor / Caught In A Trap / Lucifer / Feed The Chickens / Breakfast Is Served / Time On Our Hands"		2:10
4.	"The King's Plan"		1:21
5.	"The Music Lesson / Oh, Sing Sweet Nightingale / Bad Boy Lucifer / A Message From His Majesty"	Woods; Williams	2:06
6.	"Little Dressmakers / The Work Song / Scavenger Hunt / A Dream Is A Wish Your Heart Makes / The Dress / My Beads / Escape To The Garden"	Mice Chorus	9:24
7.	"Where Did I Put That Thing / Bibbidi Bobbidi Boo"	Felton	4:47
8.	"Reception at the Palace / So This Is Love"	Woods; Douglas	5:44
9.	"The Stroke of Midnight / Thank You Fairy Godmother"		2:05
10.	"Locked in the Tower / Gus and Jaq to the Rescue / Slipper Fittings / Cinderella's Slipper / Finale"		7:37
11.	"I'm In The Middle of a Muddle" (Demo)		1:53
12.	"I'm In The Middle of a Muddle" (New recording)	Kate Higgins	1:54
13.	"Dancing On A Cloud" (Demo)		2:00
14.	"Dancing On A Cloud" (New recording)	Jennifer Paz	2:18
15.	"The Dress My Mother Wore" (Demo)		1:37
16.	"The Dress My Mother Wore" (New recording)	Jeff Gunn; Rob Paulsen	1:38
17.	"The Mouse Song" (Demo)		2:47
18.	"The Mouse Song" (New recording)	Juliana Hansen	2:54
19.	"The Face That I See In the Night" (Demo)		3:45
20.	"The Face That I See In the Night" (New recording)	Gunn; Higgins	4:10
21.	"Sing a Little, Dream A Little" (Demo)		2:35
22.	"Sing a Little, Dream A Little" (New recording)	Hansen	2:52
23.	"I Lost My Heart At the Ball" (Demo)		2:32
24.	"I Lost My Heart At the Ball" (New recording)	Gunn; Paz	2:52
Total length:			78:26

=== The Legacy Collection ===
Disc 1
No.	Title	Artist(s)	Length
1.	"Main Title / Cinderella"	Nixon; Jud Conlon Chorus	2:51
2.	"A Dream Is a Wish Your Heart Makes"	Woods	4:34
3.	"A Visitor / Caught in a Trap/Lucifer / Feed the Chickens / Breakfast Is Served / Time On Our Hands"		2:10
4.	"The King's Plan"		1:21
5.	"The Music Lesson / Oh, Sing Sweet Nightingale / Bad Boy Lucifer / A Message from His Majesty"	Woods; Williams	2:06
6.	"Little Dressmakers / The Work Song/Scavenger Hunt / A Dream Is a Wish Your Heart Makes / The Dress / My Beads / Escape to the Garden"	Mice Chorus	9:24
7.	"Where Did I Put That Thing / Bibbidi-Bobbidi-Boo (The Magic Song)"	Felton	4:47
8.	"Reception at the Palace / So This Is Love"	Woods; Douglas	5:44
9.	"The Stroke of Midnight / Thank You Fairy Godmother"		2:05
10.	"Locked in the Tower / Gus and Jaq to the Rescue / Slipper Fittings / Cinderella's Slipper / Finale"		7:36
Total length:			42:38

Disc 2
No.	Title	Artist(s)	Length
1.	"I'm in the Middle of a Muddle Demo"		1:53
2.	"I'm In the Middle of a Muddle"	Higgins	1:54
3.	"I Lost My Heart at the Ball Demo"		2:00
4.	"I Lost My Heart at the Ball"	Paz	2:18
5.	"The Mouse Song Demo"		1:37
6.	"The Mouse Song"	Gunn; Paulsen	1:38
7.	"Sing a Little, Dream a Little Demo"		2:47
8.	"Sing a Little, Dream a Little"	Hansen	2:54
9.	"Dancing on a Cloud Demo"		3:45
10.	"Dancing on a Cloud Performed"	Gunn; Higgins	4:10
11.	"The Dress That My Mother Wore Demo"		2:35
12.	"The Dress That My Mother Wore"	Hansen	2:52
13.	"The Face That I See in the Night Demo"		2:32
14.	"The Face That I See in the Night"	Gunn; Paz	2:54
15.	"Cinderella: Prologue"	Chorus	4:40
16.	"Cat and Mice / The King's Plans"		3:50
17.	"Entanglements / Dress Building"		5:04
18.	"The Palace at Evening / A Dress for the Ball"		2:56
19.	"Royal Fanfare and Reception at the Palace"		2:44
20.	"So This Is Love" (Waltz)		1:58
21.	"Midnight Chase"		1:36
22.	"A Perfect Fit"		1:30
23.	"Cinderella" (Finale)	Chorus	1:06
Total length:			61:13

== Accolades ==
Award	Category	Nominee(s)	Result
Academy Awards	Best Scoring of a Musical Picture	Oliver Wallace and Paul Smith	Nominated
Academy Awards	Best Original Song	"Bibbidi-Bobbidi-Boo"; Music and Lyrics by Mack David, Al Hoffman and Jerry Livingston	Nominated
Academy Awards	Best Sound Recording	C. O. Slyfield	Nominated

== Bibliography ==
- Barrier, Michael (2007). The Animated Man: A Life of Walt Disney. University of California Press. ISBN 978-0-5202-5619-4.
- Koenig, David (1997). Mouse Under Glass: Secrets of Disney Animation & Theme Parks. Bonaventure Press. ISBN 978-0-9640-6051-7.
