= Cinderella III: A Twist in Time =

2007 animated film by Frank Nissen

- DVD cover
- Directed by: Frank Nissen
- Written by: Dan Berendsen; Margaret Heidenry; Colleen Ventimilia; Eddie Guzelian
- Produced by: Margot Pipkin
- Starring: Jennifer Hale; C. D. Barnes; Susanne Blakeslee; Corey Burton; Tress MacNeille; Andre Stojka; Russi Taylor
- Edited by: Lisa Linder Silver
- Music by: Joel McNeely
- Production company: Disneytoon Studios; (Note: Animation outsourced to Toon City Animation.)
- Distributed by: Buena Vista Home Entertainment (Note: Released through the Walt Disney Pictures banner.)
- Release date: February 6, 2007
- Running time: 70 minutes
- Country: United States
- Language: English
- Budget: $8 million

Cinderella III: A Twist in Time is a 2007 American animated direct-to-video musical fantasy film produced by Disneytoon Studios and distributed by Buena Vista Home Entertainment. Directed by Frank Nissen from a screenplay written by Dan Berendsen, Margaret Heidenry, Colleen Ventimilia, and Eddie Guerlain, it is the third installment in Disney's Cinderella trilogy and a sequel to Cinderella (1950) and prequel to Cinderella II: Dreams Come True (2002). In Cinderella III: A Twist in Time, set one year after the first film, Cinderella struggles with the effects of a time-reversing spell cast by Lady Tremaine to prevent her from marrying the Prince. The film's voice cast consists of Jennifer Hale, C. D. Barnes, Susanne Blakeslee, Tress MacNeille, Russi Taylor, and Andre Stojka, most of whom continue to replace the 1950 film's cast by reprising their roles from Cinderella II: Dreams Come True.

Cinderella III: A Twist in Time was completed over the course of two years, from 2004 to 2006. Inspired by Anastasia's romantic subplot introduced in Dreams Come True, A Twist in Time expands upon her reformation into a more sympathetic character, while the writers updated Cinderella and the Prince's personalities to be more appealing to modern audiences. Although none of Cinderella's original animators were involved in the sequel, the filmmakers referenced the 1950 film and Disney's Animation Research Library for research and inspiration. The film was one of Disney's last direct-to-video sequels before the studio pivoted towards making original content. A Twist in Time was also the final project produced by DisneyToon Studios Australia, with Disney dissolving various departments while the film was still in production.

Cinderella III: A Twist in Time was released direct-to-video on February 6, 2007. Unlike most of Disney's direct-to-video sequels, it received generally positive reviews from critics, who deemed it a vast improvement over its immediate predecessor and praised the character developments of Cinderella, the Prince, and Anastasia. Cinderella III: A Twist in Time has grossed nearly $93 million in home video sales.

== Plot ==
Cinderella's Fairy Godmother, Jaq, and Gus host a picnic to celebrate Cinderella and the Prince's first wedding anniversary. Since marrying the Prince, Cinderella's stepmother, Lady Tremaine, has been forcing her daughters, Drizella and Anastasia, to perform Cinderella's old housework. Anastasia grows distracted and stumbles upon the picnic, discovering that the Fairy Godmother's magic helped Cinderella meet the Prince at the ball. When the Fairy Godmother drops her magic wand, Anastasia steals it and shows it to Lady Tremaine, who is only convinced once Anastasia accidentally turns the Fairy Godmother into a statue.

Seizing the opportunity to restore her fortunes at Cinderella's expense, Lady Tremaine uses the wand to travel back in time to the day the Grand Duke tries the glass slipper on Cinderella. With Cinderella locked in her room, Lady Tremaine magically enlarges the slipper to fit Anastasia's foot, leading the Grand Duke to declare Anastasia as the Prince's bride. When Cinderella finally escapes, Lady Tremaine shatters her remaining glass slipper, destroying her only proof of having danced with the Prince. Undeterred, Jaq and Gus reassure Cinderella that the Prince will recognize her, and the trio follows the stepfamily to the palace.

When the Prince meets Anastasia, he instantly realizes she is not the girl he has been searching for. However, Lady Tremaine uses the wand to enchant him into believing Anastasia is the one he danced with at the ball. Cinderella sneaks into the palace as a maid and encounters the Prince, who informs her of his plan to marry Anastasia. Jaq and Gus, having seen Lady Tremaine use the wand to cast her spell, reveal the truth to Cinderella, and together they devise a plan to recover the wand.

Despite Anastasia's lack of refinement, the King grows fond of her, as she reminds him of his late wife, the Queen. He gifts her the Queen's cherished seashell, which causes Anastasia to start having mixed feelings about her family's deceit. Meanwhile, Cinderella sneaks into Lady Tremaine's bedroom and manages to steal the wand, but is captured by guards before she can reverse the spell. As she is apprehended, she grazes the Prince's hand, sparking a faint recognition. Under Lady Tremaine's orders, Cinderella is sentenced to exile and placed on a ship to leave the kingdom. Jaq and Gus reveal the entire scheme to the Prince, presenting him with Cinderella's repaired glass slipper. The sight of the slipper restores his memory, and he rushes to intercept the ship. There, he confesses his love to Cinderella, who joyfully agrees to marry him.

After returning to the palace, the Prince and Cinderella inform the King of Lady Tremaine's scheme, prompting him to order the Tremaine family's arrest. However, they flee with the wand. As Cinderella prepares for her wedding, Lady Tremaine returns with Anastasia, whom she has magically transformed into Cinderella's double. Using the wand, Lady Tremaine traps Cinderella and the mice in an enchanted pumpkin carriage driven by their cat, Lucifer. Cinderella, Jaq, and Gus work together to escape before the carriage drives over a cliff.

Cinderella arrives at the palace on horseback just in time to witness Anastasia rejecting the Prince's proposal, realizing she wants to find her own true love. Angry at Anastasia's defiance, Lady Tremaine transforms several guards into animals. The Prince uses his sword to shield Cinderella and Anastasia from the same spell, which deflects and transforms Lady Tremaine and Drizella into toads. After returning to her original form, Anastasia offers the seashell back to the King, but he declines, reminding her that everyone deserves a chance at love. Cinderella and Anastasia reconcile and restore the Fairy Godmother; she offers to return them to their original timeline, but seeing that Cinderella and the Prince’s bond has only grown stronger, decides to leave things as they are.

In a mid-credits scene, Drizella and Lady Tremaine are restored to their human forms, but are both dressed in Cinderella's old rags, much to their horror.

== Cast ==
Cast and order of credits adapted from Variety and the British Film Institute:

- Jennifer Hale as Cinderella
  - Tami Tappan provides Cinderella's singing voice
- C. D. Barnes as the Prince (Note: Although nicknamed "Prince Charming" in the media, the character's name is not mentioned in the film, and he is only ever referred to or credited as "the Prince".)
- Susanne Blakeslee as Lady Tremaine
- Tress MacNeille as Anastasia Tremaine
  - Lesli Margherita provided Anastasia's singing voice
- Russi Taylor as Drizella Tremaine and The Fairy Godmother
- Andre Stojka as the King
- Holland Taylor as Prudence
- Rob Paulsen as the Grand Duke and Jaq
- Corey Burton as Gus
- Frank Welker as Lucifer

== Production ==
=== Development ===
Adhering to Disney's then-popular strategy of releasing direct-to-video follow-ups to some of their classic animated films, Cinderella III: A Twist in Time is Cinderella's second sequel, after 2002's Cinderella II: Dreams Come True. Despite being unfavorably reviewed by critics upon release, Dreams Come True proved to be a top-seller on home video, encouraging Disney to commission a third installment. Whereas Dreams Come True resembled an anthology film containing three self-contained episodes from a canceled Cinderella television series, A Twist in Time focuses on one contiguous storyline. A Twist in Time was directed by Frank Nissen, who had previously directed the Winnie the Pooh film Pooh's Heffalump Movie (2005). Disney approached him to direct "a Cinderella movie" just as production on Pooh's Heffalump Movie was wrapping in 2004. Nissen claims he was not intimidated by the responsibility of directing a Disney property as revered as Cinderella, instead finding the opportunity a daunting but exciting challenge he hoped to learn from. He re-watched Walt Disney's 1950 film several times to obtain story and artistic inspiration.

Some critics and Disney fans protested the announcement of another Cinderella sequel. Addressing the debate surrounding the perceived inferior quality of direct-to-video Disney sequels at the time, Nissen believes the challenge is always attempting to expand upon the original in a meaningful manner: "in the case of Cinderella, she gets the prince, so what else is there to talk about? ... how do you make an equally interesting and equally strong story, an equally satisfying story, when everybody kind of knows who the characters are and what's supposed to happen". Nissen opted to ignore the studio's negative reputation and focus on simply making the best film he could possibly make. Nissen maintains that Disney executives allowed him much creative freedom to fulfill his vision. Despite essentially being an alternate re-telling of the Cinderella fairy tale, the director was not influenced by other revisionist fairy tales of the time. (Note: Popular fairy tale parodies released around this time include the Shrek film series, Hoodwinked!, Disney's own Enchanted, and the Broadway musical Wicked.) Although A Twist in Time was produced around the same time as Twice Charmed, a Cinderella-inspired stage musical hosted on the Disney Cruise Lines, Disney insists that the film is not a spin-off of the production, despite sharing songwriting team Michael Weiner and Alan Zachary. As such, A Twist in Time does not intentionally borrow elements or characters from the stage production, with Nissen explaining that any similarities between the two are merely coincidental. A Twist in Time was Disney's first direct-to-video sequel to officially contain "III" in its title, despite not being Disney's first direct-to-video sequel to be a franchise's third instalment.

The voice cast consists of a roster of established voice actors Disney typically re-hires to voice their older animated characters, re-using most of the cast from Dreams Come True for continuity. Despite understanding that these characters' voices would need to be mimicked based on previous performances, Nissen concerned himself little with the voice acting, trusting "that the actors had the skill and the craft to recreate the voices". Instead, he focused on providing the actors with material that felt authentic to the original iterations of their characters.

=== Writing ===
Cinderella III: A Twist in Time was written by Dan Berendsen, Margaret Heidenry, Colleen Ventimilia, and Eddie Guzelian. Dating back to as early as 1950's Cinderella, Anastasia had always been depicted as Cinderella's marginally less unpleasant stepsister. Inspired by Anastasia's burgeoning reformation in Cinderella II: Dreams Come True, the writers expanded upon the 2002 film's subplot about Anastasia becoming a more sympathetic, complex character, opting to continue her character development over Drizella's. Along with the character Prudence introduced in the previous film, Anastasia's character arc was the only recurring motif borrowed from Cinderella II, although the Baker (Anastasia's love interest in Dreams Come True) makes a cameo during the end credits.

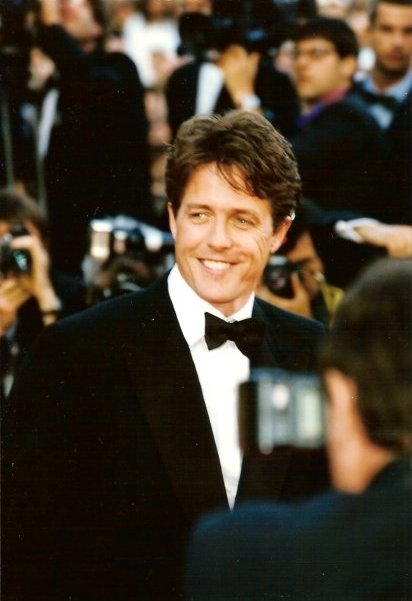
Actor Hugh Grant inspired the Prince's personality in Cinderella III: A Twist in Time.

The writers believed focusing on a supporting character would in turn offer a more interesting story, as opposed to solely highlighting Cinderella. Due to Cinderella's popularity as a character, Disney wanted to tell a different story that captured the original film's spirit nonetheless. Nissen commended the writers for crafting a compelling story, which granted them freedom to "fine-tune the emotional stuff within that structure, so we didn't have to worry about solving why something happened or the logic behind how someone was feeling" in order to focus on the more cinematic aspects of the film. He also credited producer Margot Pipkin with keeping the crew focused, resulting in few regretted cut scenes, although Nissen wishes the film could have been longer in order to accommodate new characters and concepts. A subplot revolving around Gus discovering a parallel universe inhabited by mice was storyboarded but discarded because they found it distracting from Cinderella and the Prince's relationship.

There was some discourse between Nissen and the studio over wanting to update Cinderella's themes and characters for modern audiences, without disrespecting the original film. He found adapting lead characters Cinderella and the Prince, the latter of whom plays a much larger role in A Twist in Time, particularly challenging. He felt very strongly about retaining Cinderella's original qualities despite making her a more modern heroine, believing she remains one of Disney's most beloved princesses "because of who she is" and "her attitude toward life". To reflect changes in how society viewed heroines over the 50 years since Cinderella was released, the character deliberately becomes a more active heroine during the film's second act, deciding to take control of her situation. Meanwhile, the filmmakers essentially created their version of the Prince from scratch, about whom little was previously known due to his limited screen time in the 1950 film. Nissen explained, "We didn't want him too modern so he would appear like a nice guy from the suburbs. I still wanted that romantic kind of quality to the Prince, so it was a very delicate thing". Several writers were recruited to revise the Prince's dialogue to discover the appropriate balance of self-awareness, self-deprecating humor and sincerity. The filmmakers also based his personality on those of romantic comedy leading men, citing actor Hugh Grant as a particularly influential example of embodying many of the Prince's desired qualities. Nissen credits C. D. Barnes, who voices the Prince, with imbuing the character with "the right mix of classical hero plus modern guy". The character's late mother, who is pictured in A Twist in Time for the first time, was nicknamed "Queen Gertie" during production.

Despite some early discussions about modernizing the stepmother in the vein of the musical Wicked by providing her with her own song, Nissen insisted that Lady Tremaine, who he considers to be one of Disney's greatest villains, essentially remain the same. The film's dialogue also pokes fun at some of the 1950 film's ideas, such as the idea that no other woman in the kingdom can share Cinderella's shoe size.

=== Animation ===
Despite having some animation experience, Nissen himself did very little animating on the film, instead focusing on storyboarding and occasionally re-tooling challenging scenes. During the time travel sequences, several scenes that appear nearly identical to the original film were re-drawn for the new film. Nissen explained that the original scenes could not simply be reused in A Twist in Time due to advancements in animation technology, such as aspect ratio, frame format and digitally cel-shading, otherwise colors "would be two or three generations removed by the time we processed it". Nissen decided that animating new material instead would help the revisited scenes appear more seamless in A Twist in Time. Since much of the original film's creative team had died or retired by the time production began on A Twist in Time, the director referred to Disney's Animation Research Library for character inspiration and design continuity. Describing Lady Tremaine as the film's most anatomically realistic character, Nissen worked to preserve the character's non-cartoonish appearance in order to truly convey her evil, menacing nature.

The film was completed over the course of two and a half years, beginning in early 2004 and ending late 2006, which the director described as much faster than a typical animated film. By June 2007, Disney announced that, under the creative direction of Pixar's John Lasseter, DisneyToon would abandon sequels in favor of producing exclusively original DVD content. It was initially unclear as to whether the Cinderella sequel would be completed. Ultimately, A Twist in Time was one of Disney's last direct-to-video sequels, shortly followed by The Little Mermaid: Ariel's Beginning (2008). DisneyToon Studios shifted their focus to franchises and computer animation shortly thereafter, with Nissen becoming involved in the Tinker Bell film series.

A Twist in Time was DisneyToon Studios Australia's final film. The film studio was gradually closed while A Twist in Time was still in production, but Nissen and DisneyToon Studios head Sharon Morrill commended the Australian animators for remaining determined to complete the film to the best of their ability, despite it being many of their last. Various departments were shuttered and their employees subsequently laid off once they completed their tasks. Once A Twist in Time wrapped in July 2006, the studio was closed and remaining equipment was auctioned off. The film's end credits include a dedication thanking the Australian studio "for their many years of producing beautiful hand-drawn animation". The film was produced on a budget of $8 million.

=== Music ===
Michael Weiner and Alan Zachary wrote original songs for A Twist in Time. They had also written the book and music for Twice Charmed. Composer Joel McNeely composed the film's orchestral score. He had previously scored several Disney sequels, including Return to Neverland (2002), The Jungle Book 2 (2003), Mulan II (2004), Pooh's Heffalump Movie, Lilo & Stitch 2 (2005) and The Fox and the Hound 2 (2006). Cast as Cinderella's singing voice, Broadway performer Tami Tappan recorded several songs for the film. Actress Hayden Panettiere recorded the film's theme song, "I Still Believe", one of her earliest attempts to establish a music career. Panettiere's music video was heavily rotated on Disney Channel at the time and was included as a bonus feature on the film's DVD. A soundtrack released March 2, 2007, and featuring a cover by singer Laura Dickinson, is available for digital download on Apple Music.

== Release ==
Cinderella III: A Twist in Time was released direct-to-DVD on February 6, 2007. The film returned to the Disney Vault on January 31, 2008, alongside Cinderella and Dreams Come True. On November 20, 2012, A Twist in Time was released on Blu-ray on November 20, 2012, as a double feature with Dreams Come True.

Variety predicted that the film would earn "healthy if not quite humongous sales and rentals". Cinderella III: A Twist in Time topped the national DVD sales chart during its first week of release, selling 80% more copies than its closest competition, Flags of Our Fathers (2006). The film retained its top position and continued to outsell Flags of Our Fathers the following week by twice as much. The film had fallen to second place by the end of the month, but still sold more than twice as many copies as the third-place entry, Open Season (2006). By 2008, Cinderella III: A Twist in Time had earned more than $80 million in home video sales. The film has ultimately earned over $92 million, with The Numbers reporting that A Twist in Time has grossed $92,915,486 in-home video sales to-date.

The film was among the first several titles to premiere on Disney+ when the streaming service launched on November 12, 2019.

== Critical reception ==
Direct-to-video Disney sequels are typically known to have a poor reputation among critics and fans of their original works. However, Cinderella III: A Twist in Time performed better than its contemporaries upon release. It received mostly positive reviews from critics, who praised it for its cleverness and improving upon its immediate predecessor. The review aggregator Rotten Tomatoes reported a 75% approval rating based on eight reviews, with an average rating of 6.03/10, significantly higher than Cinderella II: Dreams Come True's 13% rating.

Writing for AllMovie, Jason Buchanan said A Twist in Time is "a compelling twist on the familiar fairy tale" and "an enchanting animated sequel filled with show-stopping musical numbers, nail-biting suspense, and magical wonders for the entire family". BBC Online reviewed the film as "a classic story re-told in a refreshing funny way". Joe Strike of Animation World Network called A Twist in Time "an excellent film, in some ways better than the original—richer emotionally and with characters who transcend their caricatured origins to display depth and personality". Film critic and historian Joe Leydon described the film as a "lightly amusing animated vidpic" that "should satisfy its obvious target audience of easily distracted moppets, doting and/or indulgent parents and grandparents, and tweeners who still dream of becoming princesses". Common Sense Media contributor Nancy Davis Kho called A Twist in Time a "funny, likable twist on the original Cinderella", while Female.com.au expected fans of the heroine to enjoy it. John Lasser of Blogcritics reviewed the film as "a more than acceptable addition to the [Cinderella] franchise" but criticized its songs. Channel Awesome's Doug Walker described A Twist in Time as one of Disney's "strangest" and "most entertaining" direct-to-video releases, while Ed Perkis of CinemaBlend found the film more imaginative than most of Disney's direct-to-video offerings. Cinderella, the Prince, and Anastasia's personalities and arcs were widely praised by various critics. Eileen Clarke of Entertainment Weekly praised Cinderella's resourcefulness and determination, Anastasia's transformation into "a multi-layered, more sympathetic character", and the film's plot for teaching young girls that happily ever after is attainable but "a lot of work". While praising Nissen's direction, DVD Talk's Brian Orndorf lauded MacNeille's performance as Anastasia, writing that the actress "gives a rich, sweet reading of Anastasia that the film eventually comes to rely on in an unexpected way".

Rory L. Aronsky of Film Threat admitted that "At the very least, [A Twist in Time] was treated with a level of dignity and poise" they believe had not been offered to the Little Mermaid (1989), Aladdin (1992), and Pocahontas (1995) sequels. Despite criticizing its character designs, action sequences, and script, David Cornelius of DVD Talk praised the animation quality and found the film a vast improvement over Dreams Come True. Andrew Scharf of CHUD.com described the film as a decent but unnecessary sequel, criticizing Disney for continuing to "taint the goodwill of the mostly classic original films". Scharf also found the film's self-aware humor "out of place", comparing it negatively to Shrek 2 (2004). In a negative review, C. S. Strowbridge of The Numbers dismissed A Twist in Time as predictable and cliched, while criticizing its animation as "terribly flat". Faulting the film for adhering to the Disney sequel formula too closely, Amazon contributor Jon Foster said A Twist in Time "can't hold a torch to the original", despite being superior to Dreams Come True.

== Legacy ==
Over time, Cinderella III: A Twist in Time has developed a reputation as one of Disney's best direct-to-video sequels. Following Disney's decision to stop producing direct-to-video sequels in 2007, Slate's Dan Kois used A Twist in Time to defend the practice, describing the film as a worthy successor to the original. Polygon ranked A Twist in Time Disney's second-best direct-to-video sequel, while Insider ranked it fourth. Declaring the film "one of the best direct-to-video sequels Disney made", Ross Bonaime of Collider believes A Twist in Time pushed boundaries like no Disney sequel had done prior. In 2022, Bonaime wrote that A Twist in Time represents "a bygone era of Disney, an era where these worlds were open sandboxes that could be explored and tinkered around with. No, it rarely worked to the longterm benefit of the brand, but it was unique and wild in a way Disney rarely is anymore". Bonaime also said A Twist in Time pre-dated Disney's era of releasing live-action remakes that re-examine and deconstruct their classic films, identifying it as a precursor to Maleficent (2014), Cinderella (2015), and Cruella (2021).

Anthony Gramuglia of Comic Book Resources cited the film as a standout example of Disney's direct-to-video sequels taking a satirical approach to revisiting their original films: "These irreverent movies have fun with the potential offered by a direct-to-video sequel and tell entertaining, fun stories—assuming, of course, you're up for ridiculous takes on classic Disney films". Kevin Wong of GameSpot named A Twist in Time one of Disney's seven weirdest sequels. In recent years, some media publications have compared A Twist in Time's time travel storyline to the superhero film Avengers: Endgame (2019).
