= Disney Princess: My Fairytale Adventure =

2012 video game

- North American Wii box art
- Developer: High Impact Games
- Publisher: Disney Interactive Studios
- Composer: Mark Watters
- Series: Disney Princess
- Platforms: Wii; Nintendo 3DS; Microsoft Windows
- Release: 2012
- Genre: Adventure
- Mode: Single-player

Disney Princess: My Fairytale Adventure is a 2012 video game released for the Wii, Nintendo 3DS, and PC. The game was published by Disney Interactive Studios as a part of the Disney Princess franchise.

== Summary ==
Players become the Fairy Godmother's apprentice and use their magic wands to stop a dark spell that has been cast over the kingdoms. They can enter the worlds of Disney princesses such as Belle, Rapunzel, Ariel, Cinderella, and Tiana and discover locations from the Disney films, including the Beast's castle, Rapunzel's tower, and Cinderella's ball. Players are also able to interact with supporting Disney characters from the films, play minigames, and personalize their characters and rooms in the Fairy Godmother's castle. They can earn gems while doing quests, which can then be exchanged for unique items.

== Reception ==
Canadian Online Gamers gave the game a score of 83/100: "As far as Disney games on the 3DS are concerned, Disney Princess: My Fairytale Adventure ranks among the better ones out there. The visuals are vibrant, and the varied gameplay will keep all those aspiring Princesses busy for hours on end. While the gameplay does tend to get tedious at times, the reality is that the game's target audience, girls anywhere from 5 to 10, will definitely enjoy the game, provided, of course, they adore those Disney Princess characters". Common Sense Media rated the game 4/5 stars for "quality", writing: "Disney Princess: My Fairytale Adventure is a non-violent adventure game in which kids take on the role of a customizable fairy godmother-in-training. Its simple themes of friendship and doing your duty are safe for kids, and its intuitive controls and elementary activities are suitable for kids as young as four or five years old. The only potential concern is that the game features plenty of commercial Disney characters and goes a little heavy on Princess glamor".Gaming XP gave the game an 82/100: "The game is perfectly designed for children and has a good mix of Disney flair, difficulty, and gameplay. In addition to that, it looks good, especially with the 3D effect, and has a fully localized language edition. Disney Princess: My Fairytale Adventure also comes with collectibles, so a more in-depth experience is produced. Too bad that the playing time is a little too short; otherwise, an even higher rating would have been easily possible."

Nintendo Life was less impressed with the game and gave it a rating of 2 stars out of 10, describing it as "crawling with glitches, slowdown, repetitive gameplay, disinterested voice actors, and stiff controls [...] less a game than it is a mess of unfinished code. [...] Young gamers will likely get a kick out of interacting with their favourite characters, but the magic fizzles all too soon when the adventure is this uninspired. There are many opportunities to customize small aspects of the game, such as your character's appearance and a bedroom you can decorate, but it's simply not worth the effort".
