= Lady Tremaine =

Fictional character from Cinderella

- Cinderella character
- Lady Tremaine in Cinderella (1950)
- First appearance: Cinderella (1950)
- Created by: Frank Thomas
- Based on: The Wicked Stepmother from Charles Perrault's fairytale
- Voiced by: Eleanor Audley (in Cinderella); Susanne Blakeslee (in sequels)
- Portrayed by: Cate Blanchett (2015 film); Linda Ko (Descendants 3); Julee Cerda (Descendants: The Rise of Red)

In-universe information
- Alias: The Wicked Stepmother
- Nickname: Madame Tremaine
- Species: Human; Toad (temporarily)
- Title: Lady
- Occupation: Socialite
- Affiliation: Disney Villains
- Spouses: Cinderella's father (deceased); Sir Francis Tremaine (deceased; 2015 film)
- Children: Drizella Tremaine (daughter); Anastasia Tremaine (daughter; disowned in animated sequels); Cinderella (step-daughter; disowned)
- Relatives: Prince Charming (step-son-in-law; disowned); Anthony Tremaine (grandson; Descendants); Dizzy Tremaine (granddaughter; Descendants); Chad Charming (step-grandson; Descendants); Chloe Charming (step-granddaughter; Descendants)
- Pet(s): Lucifer (cat)

Lady Tremaine is a fictional character who appears in Walt Disney Productions' animated film Cinderella (1950) and its direct-to-video sequels Cinderella II: Dreams Come True (2002) and Cinderella III: A Twist in Time (2007). In the original film, Lady Tremaine is voiced by Eleanor Audley. For the sequels and subsequent appearances, Audley was succeeded by Susanne Blakeslee.

Lady Tremaine treats Cinderella, her stepdaughter, like a scullery maid and focuses all of her attention on her own two daughters, Drizella and Anastasia. She is based on The Wicked Stepmother character from the original fairytale by Charles Perrault. Lady Tremaine was animated by Frank Thomas.

In the 2015 live-action remake of the 1950 animated film, Tremaine is portrayed by Cate Blanchett and is given a backstory where she hears Ella's father say that he loved his first wife more. This explains her hatred toward Cinderella, because she reminded her of how her late husband gave all of his love to his first wife and Tremaine herself was getting none of it.

== Development ==
Animators Ollie Johnston and Frank Thomas, in their book The Disney Villain, describe animating Eleanor Audley's voice as "a difficult assignment but a thrilling one, working to that voice track with so much innuendo mixed in with the fierce power." Audley, who later performed as Maleficent, the evil fairy, in Sleeping Beauty, provided some live-action recording for both of these characters, to inspire the animators. It was noted in April 2012 that Lady Tremaine's physical appearance and personality was inspired by Bette Davis's performance as Regina Giddens in The Little Foxes.

In contrast to the broad treatment given to some of the other characters, Lady Tremaine was animated in malevolent and subtle realism. A cruel, cold, and calculating tyrant, Tremaine wants nothing more than her daughters to succeed. Unlike most Disney villains, who sport fiery personalities and desire power and the spotlight, she possesses a more cunning, subtle, passive-aggressive personality with a shrewd intelligence and ability for manipulation, particularly towards her daughters. She rarely yells, speaking in a calm, collected voice, even when angered. She wishes her daughters to succeed so that she may reap the benefits when it best suits her, although she becomes much more physically and emotionally abusive towards not only Cinderella, but also her two genetic daughters, as it becomes clear that she is only using them to gain access to an opulent lifestyle in the Palace.

== Appearances ==
=== Cinderella films ===
==== Cinderella (1950) ====
In the animated film, where she is voiced by Eleanor Audley, Lady Tremaine is introduced in the prologue of the film. Cinderella's father, a widower anxious for his daughter to have a mother figure, married Tremaine, whom the narrator describes as "a woman of good family". She was a widow herself, with two daughters from her first marriage. After an unspecified amount of time living happily together as a family, Cinderella's father tragically died and Tremaine revealed her true colors. She lets the chateau fall into disrepair while pampering her own selfishly spoiled daughters and forcing Cinderella to become a maid in her own home. Tremaine allows Cinderella to attend the Royal Ball, on the condition that Cinderella finishes all her chores and finds a suitable dress. When Cinderella actually finishes her work and appears ready for the Ball in a suitable dress, Tremaine mildly mentions the beads and sash that Jaq and Gus found after Anastasia and Drizella threw them out. Enraged, her daughters cruelly tear apart Cinderella's dress, leaving her unable to attend the ball. When Cinderella, with the help of a Fairy Godmother, nevertheless attends the ball, her stepfamily does not recognize her, but Tremaine notes a familiarity about her appearance as she dances with Prince Charming.

News promptly arrives by way of a Royal Proclamation that the Prince will marry the girl whose foot fits the glass slipper accidentally left behind by Cinderella at the ball. Lady Tremaine overhears Cinderella dreamily humming the song "So This is Love" as she heads to the attic, and realizes that she was the mysterious girl at the ball. Hoping to pass off one of her daughters as the mysterious girl, Tremaine follows Cinderella up to the attic and locks her in her room, putting the key in her pocket. However, two of Cinderella's mice friends, Gus and Jaq, steal the key from the stepmother's pocket, and succeed in returning the key to Cinderella, who rushes downstairs to the Grand Duke just as he and the footman are about to leave. Tremaine attempts to convince the Duke that Cinderella is a lowly scullery maid who did not attend the ball. But the Duke, who is required by the King's Royal Proclamation not to skip a single maiden in the kingdom on his quest for the mysterious girl the Prince danced with, rebuffs Tremaine. The Duke also finds Cinderella strikingly familiar to him. He proceeds to try the glass slipper on Cinderella. In a last-ditch effort to foil Cinderella's dreams, Tremaine trips the footman bearing the glass slipper, causing it to smash. She deviously grins with wicked satisfaction as the Duke wails in despair and fear of the King's reaction when he finds out that the slipper was broken. But Cinderella still manages to come out on top by revealing that she has the other slipper, and that it fits her foot, proving that she is the girl who danced with Prince Charming, much to her stepmother's appalled horror. Beyond a single brief close-up of her appalled face, the movie does not dwell on her defeat, how she and her daughters further reacted or what happened to them; instead there is only a quick resolution where Cinderella is shown as the Prince's happy bride, her stepfamily out of the picture.

==== Cinderella II: Dreams Come True ====
In this film, where she is voiced by Susanne Blakeslee, Lady Tremaine only appeared in the An Uncommon Romance segment, where she plans to have both Drizella and Anastasia find wealthy suitors for Cinderella's incoming ball. However, she finds out that Anastasia has fallen in love with a likable, slightly plump humble baker, and furiously forbids Anastasia to ever be with the baker as she hates commoners. Tremaine and Drizella do everything they can to thwart this romance, but Cinderella encourages Anastasia to follow her own heart (which she does). In the end, Anastasia finally cuts all ties with Tremaine to be with the baker, and Tremaine furiously disowns her on the spot before leaving with Drizella.

==== Cinderella III: A Twist in Time ====
Lady Tremaine's latest animated major appearance is in this film, where she is once again voiced by Blakeslee. This time, she acquires the Fairy Godmother's magic wand after Anastasia finds it after accidentally turning the Fairy Godmother into a statue. Still bent on ruining Cinderella's life (in what she believes to be revenge), Tremaine uses the wand to reverse time to undo Cinderella's "happily ever after". She manipulates the glass slipper to fit Anastasia so that Cinderella never gets to try on the slipper herself, then she brainwashes the Prince into forgetting Cinderella and marrying Anastasia. Even when Cinderella tries to set things right, Tremaine uses the magic wand to thwart her efforts before having her sent off from the kingdom on a ship.

Despite this, Prince regains his memories (thanks to the mice using the broken glass slipper as proof) and rescues Cinderella before telling the King of what really happened. As the King orders the arrest of Lady Tremaine and her daughters, Tremaine makes one final attempt for revenge: having Anastasia to pose as Cinderella for the wedding while sending the real Cinderella to her supposed doom. However, Cinderella escapes and witnesses Anastasia rejecting the Prince at the altar, feeling guilty that she can't marry someone who doesn't love her for who she is. Furious at Anastasia's sudden conscience and Cinderella's interference, Tremaine emerges from her hiding place and begins turning some of the palace guards into farm animals (chickens, pigs, and rabbits). On Drizella's advice, Tremaine resolves to punish both Cinderella and Anastasia by turning them into toads, but the Prince defends the two from the spell and reflects it back with his sword, turning Tremaine and Drizella into toads instead. Anastasia then gives the magic wand to Cinderella so that she can revive the Fairy Godmother and undo all the wrongs that her stepmother has committed.

During the end credits, Lady Tremaine and Drizella have been restored back to their human forms, but they are horrified to learn that they are holding brooms and wearing scullery clothes identical to those Cinderella used to wear, implying that they have been sentenced to work in the palace as servants as punishment for their crimes and villainous actions.

==== Cinderella (2015) ====
In this film, Lady Tremaine is portrayed by Cate Blanchett. A woman of grace and refinement, she married Ella's father for the sake of her daughters; shortly after her first husband Sir Francis Tremaine died. At first, Tremaine did not seem to bear any particular animosity towards Ella, but her jealousy and spite was incited after overhearing a private conversation in which it was confirmed that her second husband loved his biological daughter more than he did her, and that he still cherished the memory of his first wife. After he died while on a business trip, Tremaine was hurt and jealous that his dying words had only been of Ella and her mother. Revealing her true passive-aggressive colors, she takes her jealousy out on Ella, firing all of the servants and forcing Ella to take up most of their duties. She even joins in her daughters' childish taunting of Ella, and mocks her as "Cinderella". When she and her daughters are getting ready to go to the ball, Ella comes downstairs at the last minute, wearing a gown of her mother's. Tremaine rips one of the sleeves and encourages her daughters to help her tear the dress apart. At the ball, she is as mystified as all the other guests when a mysterious girl in a blue gown enraptures Kit (the Fairy Godmother having cast an additional spell to prevent Ella's step-family recognizing her), but realizes that it's really Ella based on her attitude after the ball. The next morning, she discovers a glass slipper hidden in the attic. Knowing that the other slipper will fit Ella, she demands that Ella make her the head of the royal household and to ensure that Drisella and Anastasia find proper husbands. Ella rejects this out of hand, telling her that she isn't about to let Kit fall into her stepmother's clutches after she failed to protect her father. An enraged Tremaine locks Ella in the attic and shatters the slipper. She then blackmails the Grand Duke into ensuring that she will become a countess and that her daughters will get wealthy husbands, in return for keeping the secret so that Kit can be married to a princess from another kingdom, as his father had originally intended. When the Captain finds Ella hidden in the attic, Tremaine initially tells the Captain that as her mother, she will not allow Ella to try it on. Ella curtly tells her that she is not, nor will she ever will be, her mother. Ella leaves with Kit after forgiving her stepmother. The Fairy Godmother narrated that the Tremaines leave the kingdom with the Grand Duke never to return.

=== Other animated appearances ===
- Lady Tremaine has made various appearances on the animated series House of Mouse; she frequently shares a table with another famous wicked stepmother, the Evil Queen from Snow White and the Seven Dwarfs.
- Lady Tremaine makes an appearance in the Who Framed Roger Rabbit Special Edition DVD in one of the menus.
- Lady Tremaine appears briefly in the 2023 short film Once Upon a Studio, where she meets with the rest of the Walt Disney Animation Studios characters for a group photo.
- In the end credits of The Simpsons short film May the 12th Be with You, Lady Tremaine appears along with the Evil Queen and Mother Gothel protesting against Disney being unfair to stepmothers.

=== Other live action appearances ===
==== Once Upon a Time ====
Two versions of Lady Tremaine appear in the 2011 American drama fantasy TV series Once Upon a Time. The first version of Tremaine appears in the first season episode "The Price of Gold", portrayed by Jan Brandle Smith, and in the sixth season episode "The Other Shoe", portrayed by Lisa Banes. A second version of Tremaine appears as the main antagonist of the seventh and final season, portrayed by Gabrielle Anwar, with the character amalgamated with another fairytale character, Rapunzel. Meegan Warner plays the younger version of the character in flashbacks.

==== Descendants films ====
Lady Tremaine has a voice cameo in the sequel Descendants 2 as she yells inside her Curl Up and Dye hair salon at her granddaughter Dizzy (daughter of Drizella) to be quiet, but the actress that voiced her was uncredited.

She makes a physical appearance in Descendants 3, portrayed by Linda Ko. She says goodbye to Dizzy when her granddaughter leaves for Auradon, showing sadness as she says goodbye. She is later joyfully reunited with her at the film's climax.

In Descendants: The Rise of Red, she is portrayed by Julee Cerda.

=== Video games ===
==== Kingdom Hearts series ====
Lady Tremaine appears in Kingdom Hearts Birth by Sleep along with Anastasia and Drizella. She plays out the same role as in the film, only this time, the darkness in her heart transforms Cinderella's pumpkin coach into the Cursed Coach, an Unversed fueled by her hatred of Cinderella. The Cursed Coach attempts to kill Cinderella before Aqua defeats it.

She also appears in Kingdom Hearts Union χ, fulfilling the same role as in the 1950 film.

==== Disney Magic Kingdoms ====
Lady Tremaine appears as an unlockable playable character in Disney Magic Kingdoms.

=== Live appearances ===
==== Disney Parks ====
Lady Tremaine appears as a character that can be found around the Disney theme parks.

==== Twice Charmed: An Original Twist on the Cinderella Story ====
Lady Tremaine is the antagonist in the Disney Cruise Line Broadway-style stage musical Twice Charmed: An Original Twist on the Cinderella Story.

==== Disney's Cinderella KIDS ====
Lady Tremaine is the antagonist in the children's musical Disney's Cinderella KIDS.

=== Printed media appearances ===
==== The Isle of the Lost ====
In the novel The Isle of the Lost from the Descendants franchise, Lady Tremaine has a grandson, Anthony (son of Anastasia), and several granddaughters (referred to as the step-granddaughters). She teaches "Evil 101" in the high school Dragon Hall on the Isle of the Lost.

==== Cold Hearted: A Tale of the Evil Stepmother ====
Lady Tremaine is the antagonist in Serena Valentino's installment in the Disney Villains book franchise.

After Lord Tremaine died from an illness, Lady Tremaine married Cinderella's father, Sir Richard, seeking that she needed help in keeping her daughters under control. At the chateau however, Tremaine and her daughters were forced into servitude under Sir Richard and Cinderella. It is then revealed that Sir Richard was living in poverty and was in debt to the Royal Crown. Marrying Tremaine was the only way for him to loosen those debts, leaving her penniless under her own name. On Sir Richard's death, Tremaine took over as head of household. She then forced Cinderella to become a servant in revenge, as well as having the last laugh on having his daughter become the lowly maid.

Years after the events of the animated film, the chateau is now in complete disrepair. Tremaine, now penniless and consumed with insanity, had turned her abuse towards Drizella and Anastasia, aside from making them do the household chores. The Fairy Godmother then appeared to help the stepsisters and give them a second chance at the request of Cinderella. Tremaine then proceeded to attack the Fairy Godmother, who turned her into a stone statue.

== References in other media ==
In Jake and the Never Land Pirates, Mama Hook (voiced by Sharon Osbourne), Captain Hook's mother is based on Lady Tremaine.

The Twisted Wonderland franchise includes the character Mozus Trein, a teacher at Night Raven College who is based on Lady Tremaine, looking elegant like her and also having a black cat as a pet.

The 2026 debut novel of Rachel Hochhauser, Lady Tremaine, is a feminist reimagining of the Cinderella story from the so-called “evil stepmother”’s point of view, demonstrating how far she will go for her children in a deeply patriarchal society.

== See also ==
- Cinderella effect
