= Disney's Fairy Tale Weddings & Honeymoons =

Wedding and travel subsidiary of Disney Parks

- Type: Programme
- Industry: Wedding and travel
- Founded: 1991
- Headquarters: Franck’s Studio, Walt Disney World, Lake Buena Vista, Florida, US
- Services: Wedding planning
- Parent: Disney Parks, Experiences and Products (The Walt Disney Company)

The Disney's Fairy Tale Weddings & Honeymoons is a program offering wedding and honeymoon services to couples at the Disneyland Resort in California, the Walt Disney World Resort in Florida, the Tokyo Disney Resort in Japan, the Disneyland Paris Resort in France, the Hong Kong Disneyland Resort in Hong Kong, the Shanghai Disney Resort in China, and on the Disney Cruise Line. It operates within the Disney Parks, Experiences and Products segment of The Walt Disney Company.

From September 1991 to April 2017, Disney parks have hosted over 30,000 weddings with 1,300 in 2013. In 2016, there were 4,000 ceremonies at 11 per day. The division is based at Franck's Studio, which is named after the Father of the Bride character played by Martin Short. The planners are called fairy godmothers."

== History ==
Disney parks began hosting weddings in September 1991. Disney's Fairy Tale Weddings & Honeymoons division was started in 1992, with 200 wedding by October 28, 1992. In 1995, the Wedding Pavilion opened.

In 2007, Disney began offering commitment ceremonies for same-sex couples. Previously, the company only had allowed gay couples to purchase its wedding packages if they had valid California or Florida marriage licenses. Before the change in policy, gay couples were able to plan to have their own ceremonies at the resorts' rented meeting rooms.

A line of Disney Fairy Tale Wedding gowns was designed by Kirstie Kelly and available in January 2008. The Magic Kingdom train station was added as a wedding venue in 2014 but only at 7:30 AM prior to opening. On April 29, 2016, weddings would begin to be staged during park hours, with the announcement of 9:30 a.m. ceremonies at the East Plaza Garden near Cinderella's Castle. Three more sites were added as wedding location options in July 2018.

A Disney's Fairy Tale Weddings 90 minute special was announced on March 29, 2017 for Freeform. A series and another special for the show was ordered for Freeform. On October 10, 2019, it was announced that Season 2 of the series would be released in 2020, and would move from Freeform to Disney+.

== Dress line ==
A line of Disney Fairy Tale Wedding gowns designed by Kirstie Kelly became available in 2007. The original line grew to include matching jewelry, "blossom" flower girl dresses, and "maiden" bridesmaid dresses.

Disney licensed Alfred Angelo in 2010 to produce Disney Fairy Tale Weddings dresses. With the 2015 line, Elsa was added. In early September 2017, Kuraudia Co. revealed its licensed Disney line of 14 rental wedding dress based on six princesses.

After the closing of Alfred Angelo due to bankruptcy in late 2018, Allure Bridals will begin selling their Collection of wedding dresses bridal-wear line which includes 16 styles in a variety of silhouettes from romantic ball gowns to mermaid trains and fit and flare hemlines and fabrications include soft mikado, ethereal tulle and flowing chiffon, balanced by the dramatic structure of ruffled organza and unique, dimensional laces that are inspired by the style and spirit of Disney Princess characters such as Ariel, Aurora, Belle, Jasmine, Cinderella, Pocahontas, Rapunzel, Tiana, and Snow White and will be featured exclusively at Kleinfeld Bridal stores in New York and Toronto as the Disney Fairy Tale Weddings Platinum Collection. Allure Bridals will unveil the entire collection during New York Bridal Fashion Week in April 2020. The new bridal collection was proudly released in June and announced on ABC news and Good Morning America in June. Ranging in different sizes from 0 - 30, nine of the gowns will range from $1,200 - $2,600 and each includes a mesmerizing mix of embroidered detailing, detachable accessories, soft crepe and sprinkles of sparkle throughout and will be available 81 bridal salons across the United States, Canada, and Puerto Rico while The other seven retail from $3,500 - $9,500 and are specifically inspired by Ariel, Aurora, Tiana, Belle, Jasmine and Snow White that will exclusively be sold at Kleinfeld Bridal in New York and Toronto.

== Locations ==
- The Atrium on the Disney Dream

=== Walt Disney World Resort ===
- Magic Kingdom
  - Train Station (2014-)
  - East Plaza Garden (2016-)
- Grand Floridian Resort & Spa
  - Gazebo
  - Disney's Wedding Pavilion
- Polynesian Village Resort
  - Beach
  - Luau Pointe
- Epcot
  - China Pavilion
  - Norway Loft, Norwegian Village
- Disney’s Animal Kingdom
  - The Tree of Life
  - Harambe Street
- Disney's Fort Wilderness Resort & Campground
- Disney's Hollywood Studios
  - The Chinese Theatre

=== Wedding Pavilion ===
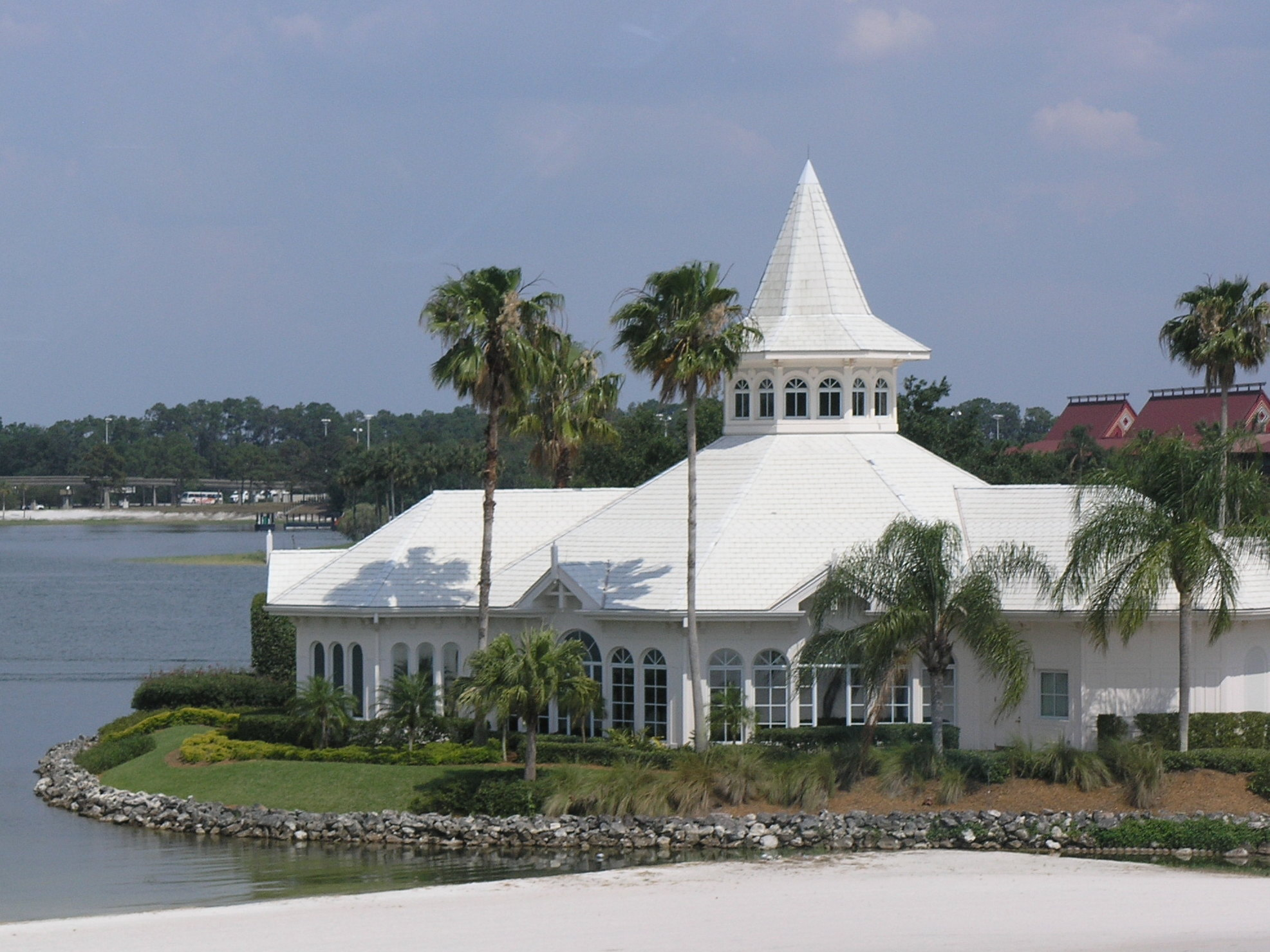
Disney's Wedding Pavilion in 2009

The Disney’s Wedding Pavilion is a Victorian wedding chapel on a private island accessible by the footbridge at the Grand Floridian Resort & Spa. The chapel has two views of Cinderella Castle and seats 250.

In 1995, the Wedding Pavilion opened. The first wedding at the pavilion was featured in the first episode of Weddings of a Lifetime with a Tennessee couple. The pavilion received a makeover in late 2016.
