= Andy Mooney =

Scottish businessman (born 1955)

Andrew P. Mooney (born 1955) is a Scottish business executive who was CEO of Fender Musical Instruments Corporation and as chairman of Disney Consumer Products. Mooney had joined the Walt Disney Company as the president of Disney Consumer Products in December 1999 and was promoted to chairman in May 2003. Businesses under Mooney's leadership and the DCP umbrella were The Baby Einstein Company, Disney Publishing Worldwide and newly re-acquired retail chain The Disney Store. He is credited with pioneering the $45 billion Disney Princess franchise.

== Early life ==
Andy Mooney is a native of Whitburn, West Lothian, United Kingdom and is the son of a miner. He holds an Accounting Certificate in the UK.

He played the electric guitar in various bands during and after high school in hopes of becoming a professional musician. He was a semi-professional musician through his 20s until he moved to the United States from the UK.

== Career ==
Prior to Disney, Mooney spent 20 years with Nike, Inc. Originally joining Nike's United Kingdom division as chief financial officer, he transitioned to marketing in 1982, holding several senior positions before becoming chief marketing officer for Nike in the United States in 1994. Immediately prior to joining DCP, Mooney was chief marketing officer and head of Nike's $3 billion Global Apparel organization with additional responsibilities for worldwide marketing strategies for the Nike and Jordan brands. He led the reorganization of Nike's brand marketing activities and introduced new advertising strategies.

In 2000, Mooney, having recently been made chairman of Disney Consumer Products Worldwide, went to see a Disney on Ice show in Phoenix, Arizona, where he saw little girls dressed as princesses, wearing handmade gowns with mismatched jewelry. Though he noted the deep affection for the characters with which these outfits were made, he imagined that ones assembled professionally by Disney could be lucrative. He successfully packaged the characters together under a single media franchise for the first time in Disney history. Under the Disney Princess brand, Disney sold items such as a yellow organza Belle costume, Sleeping Beauty pajamas and matching accessories. As of 2011, the franchise is a $4 billion-a-year brand featuring 26,000 products.

In early 2001, his executive assistant, Pamela, brought him an idea of creating a line of wedding dresses inspired by the Disney Princesses. Giving the go-ahead, Pamela approached Vera Wang for the opportunity to design the gowns. Ms. Wang declined the opportunity, which resulted in Mooney pulling together a group of Disney creative people. Under Mooney's leadership this team, the Disney Global Creative team created he Disney Fairy Tale Weddings line. The wedding dresses are inspired by the princess characters, and they later were designed by Kirstie Kelly.

Mooney announced his resignation from Disney on September 6, 2011, to pursue interests with other companies.

In March 2012, Mooney joined the Board of shopkick, the mobile shopping application, along with Kleiner Perkins and Reid Hoffman.

In January 2013, Quiksilver announced that Mooney would be its new president and chief executive officer, replacing Bob McKnight. On March 27, 2015, Quiksilver announced the termination of Mooney as CEO of the company. He was replaced as CEO by Pierre Agnes, who had worked at Quiksilver for 27 years and was promoted to president in November 2014.

On June 2, 2015, Mooney was appointed CEO of Fender Musical Instruments Corporation, replacing Scott Gilbertson. As part of Mooney's strategy to concentrate on Digital assets rather than manufacture, Fender re-located to Los Angeles, California and heavily invested in expertise to bring Mooney's vision to fruition. No published information exists on the Return On Investment (ROI) for Fender Play, Fender Songs, Fender Academy or Mooney's digital strategy in general. Fender's manufacturing continues to re-brand/rename existing product lines in order to take advantage of competition law and new product introduction price protection. In January 2020 Fender were fined £4.5 million ($5.9 million) for breaking British competition law. The fine is the largest ever imposed by the U.K.'s Competition and Markets Authority (CMA) for price fixing, or what it terms as "resale price maintenance".

In the fall of 2015 Mooney executed the re-structure of Fender Musical Instruments Europe (FMIE) set up in the early 2000s by Bill Schultz and Bill Mendello with the appointment of Graeme Mathieson as FMIE Managing Director.

In January 2026, Fender announced that Mooney would retire from the company and be succeeded as CEO by Edward 'Bud' Cole on February 16.
