= Disney Princess =

Walt Disney Company media franchise

- Logo used since 2024
- Created by: Andy Mooney
- Original work: Animated films by Walt Disney Animation Studios and Pixar Animation Studios
- Owner: The Walt Disney Company
- Years: 2000–present

Print publications
- Books: Disney Princess Chapter Books; A Jewel Story
- Comics: Kilala Princess; Disney Princesses series; Disney Princess Comics
- Magazine: Disney Princess

Films and television
- Animated series: The Princess Power Hour (block); Sofia the First; Whisker Haven Tales with the Palace Pets; Sofia the First: Royal Magic
- Television specials: Lego Disney Princess: The Castle Quest; Lego Disney Princess: Villains Unite; Lego Disney Princess: Magical Mayhem
- Direct-to-video: Enchanted Tales: Follow Your Dreams

Games
- Video games: Disney Princess; Royal Adventure; Magical Jewels; Enchanted Journey; Enchanting Storybooks; My Fairytale Adventure

Audio
- Original music: Disney's Princess Favorites; Disney Princess: The Ultimate Song Collection; Disney Princess Tea Party; Ultimate Disney Princess

Miscellaneous
- Toys: Dolls; Palace Pets; Comics line figures
- Extension: Palace Pets
- Clothing: Disney Fairy Tale Weddings collection

Official website
- princess.disney.com

Disney Princess, also called the Princess Line, is a media franchise and toy line owned by the Walt Disney Company. Created by Disney Consumer Products chairman Andy Mooney, the franchise features a lineup of female characters who have appeared in various Disney films.

The franchise does not include all princess characters from the whole of Disney-owned media but rather refers to select specific female lead characters from the company's animated films, including only protagonists of theatrical animated films from Walt Disney Pictures, with twelve characters from Walt Disney Animation Studios films and one character from a Pixar film, with the term "Princess" for the franchise being used as a title in a way unrelated to the royal title, being used as a term for specific heroines who have shown certain inspiring qualities.

The franchise has released dolls, sing-along videos, apparel, beauty products, home decor, toys, and various other products featuring some of the Disney Princesses. Licensees for the franchise include Glidden (wall paint), Stride Rite (sparkly shoes), Funko (vinyl figures), Fisher-Price (plastic figurines), Lego (Lego sets), Hasbro, Jakks Pacific, and Mattel (games and dolls). It is one of the highest-grossing media franchises of all time.

== History ==
=== Conception ===
Standing in line in the arena [of a Disney on Ice show], I was surrounded by little girls dressed head to toe as princesses...They weren't even Disney products. They were generic princess products they'd appended to a Halloween costume. And the light bulb went off. Clearly, there was latent demand here. So the next morning I said to my team, "O.K., let's establish standards and a color palette and talk to licensees and get as much product out there as we possibly can that allows these girls to do what they're doing anyway: projecting themselves into the characters from the classic movies."

— Mooney, on his creation of the Disney Princess franchise as reported by The New York Times

Former Nike, Inc. executive Andy Mooney was appointed president of the Walt Disney Company's Disney Consumer Products division in December 1999. While attending his first Disney on Ice show, Mooney noticed that several young girls attending the show were dressed in princess attire—though not authentic Disney merchandise. "They were generic princess products they'd appended to a Halloween costume," Mooney told The New York Times. Concerned by this, Mooney addressed the company the following morning and encouraged them to commence work on a legitimate Disney Princess franchise in January 2000. Mooney's insight was that the company was "missing a key element in merchandising the characters"; he wanted to bring them together under one franchise for the first time. Walt's nephew, Roy E. Disney, objected to the creation of the line, as the company had long "avoided mingling characters from its classic fairy tales in other narratives, worrying that it would weaken the individual mythologies."

The original Disney Princess line-up was formalized in 2000, consisting of Snow White, Cinderella, Tinker Bell, Aurora, Ariel, Belle, Jasmine, Pocahontas, Esmeralda, and Mulan. Tinker Bell and Esmeralda were removed in 2005; the former would go on to headline the sister franchise Disney Fairies (also created by Mooney).

The creation of Disney Princess was the first time that the member characters would be displayed together as part of a single media franchise, separate from their original films. Mooney decided that, when featured in marketing advertisements such as posters, the princesses should never make eye contact with each other to keep their individual "mythologies" intact. "[Each] stares off in a slightly different direction as if unaware of the other's presence."

In an unconventional manner, Mooney and his team launched the Disney Princess line without utilizing any focus groups and with minimal marketing. By 2001, Disney Consumer Products (DCP) had generated about $300 million, but by 2012, the division had increased revenue to $3 billion, making it the top seller of consumer entertainment products globally. DCP issued princess product licenses to Hasbro for games, Mattel for dolls, and Fisher-Price for plastic figurines in 2000, allowing the franchise to meet the $1 billion mark in revenue in three years.

=== Expansions ===
==== Inductions and coronations ====
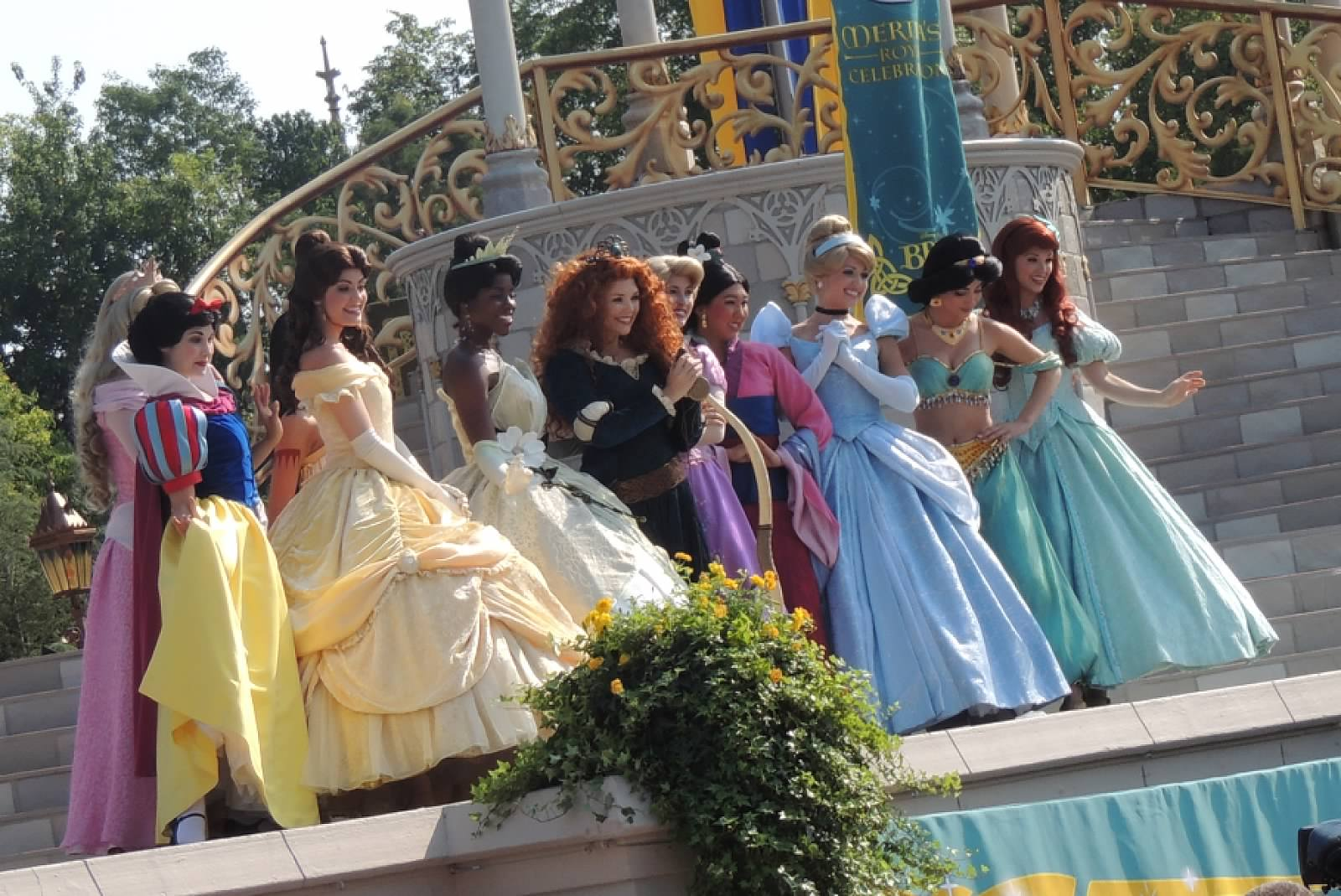
The Princesses at Merida's coronation on Cinderella Castle's forecourt stage at the Magic Kingdom Park at Walt Disney World on May 11, 2013

Tiana became the first additional character to the Disney Princess franchise officially on March 14, 2010, taking Tinker Bell's short-lived place as the ninth member. Her "coronation" took place at the Lotte New York Palace Hotel in Midtown Manhattan. The latter was already heading up another franchise, Disney Fairies, starting in 2005.

Rapunzel was crowned and inducted into the franchise as the tenth member on October 2, 2011, during "Rapunzel's Royal Celebration," a special event in London. Also attended by the other Princesses plus the Fairy Godmother and Flynn Rider, it included a procession through Hyde Park concluding with a ceremony at Kensington Palace in the Royal Borough of Kensington and Chelsea, a residence used by the Royal Family since the 17th century and whose residents included Diana, Princess of Wales and Princess Margaret, Countess of Snowdon. Disney hosted the event in cooperation with Historic Royal Palaces, a British nonprofit organization that maintains the State Rooms.

On May 11, 2013, Merida became the first Pixar character as well as the eleventh member of the franchise series in a coronation ceremony in front of Cinderella Castle at the Magic Kingdom Park at Walt Disney World in Orlando, Florida.

In May 2019, Moana was added to the line-up as the twelfth member of the franchise without having a coronation ceremony, but rather being included in new merchandise.

In August 2022, it was announced that Raya from Raya and the Last Dragon would be inducted as the thirteenth member of the franchise during World Princess Week at Disneyland Paris. In January 2023, she was featured on some Disney Princess products and was later added in August that year among the other princesses on their official website.

At different points, Jane Porter (Tarzan), Giselle (Enchanted), and Anna and Elsa (Frozen) were considered to be included in the line-up, but did not officially join.

==== Redesigns, merchandise and other events ====
A line of Disney Fairy Tale Wedding gowns were designed by Kirstie Kelly, based on the Princesses, and were available in January 2008.

In 2012, the Princesses were given modern redesigns. While some like Tiana and Rapunzel just had added glitter on their outfits, others like Ariel, Belle, and Jasmine received new hairstyles or modified outfits. The most drastic of these was Cinderella, who was given side-swept bangs and an outfit with sheer sleeves.

With Target as its marketing partner, Disney held the first National Princess Week on April 23, 2012. During the week, there was the release of The Princess Diaries on Blu-ray and the book The Very Fairy Princess. In 2012, Harrods celebrated Christmas with a Disney Princess theme, featuring designer gowns from houses like Oscar de la Renta. In August, the dress was on display at the D23 Expo before being auctioned on November 13 to benefit Great Ormond Street Hospital Children's Charity.

Mattel added a Barbie princess-themed line in late 2010 and the fairy tale-based Ever After High in 2013. With these competing lines and an expiration of the brand license at the end of 2015, Disney offered Hasbro a chance to gain the license, given their work on Star Wars, which led to a Descendants license. DCP was also attempting to evolve the brand by marketing them less as damsels and more as heroines. In September 2014, Disney announced that Hasbro would be the licensed doll maker for the Disney Princess line starting on January 1, 2016.

Logo used for the franchise from 2014 to 2024

The June 2013 release of the Disney Princess Palace Pets app from Disney Publishing led DCP to turn Palace Pets into a Disney Princess franchise extension, with the release of the Palace Pets toy line in August from licensee Blip Toys. The line was also selected by TimetoPlayMag.com for its Most Wanted List Holiday 2013. In 2015, Disney Publishing released the animated short series Whisker Haven Tales with the Palace Pets. The short journey to the magical world of Whisker Haven, a secret realm deep in a fairy tale land between the Disney Princess kingdoms.

Disney Consumer Products and Interactive Media launched the Princess Comics line, which was started with Princess Comics graphic novels by Joe Books, in August 2018 at Target with Hasbro figures and Hybrid Promotions apparel. This expansion featured Ariel, Belle, Jasmine, Pocahontas, and Rapunzel.

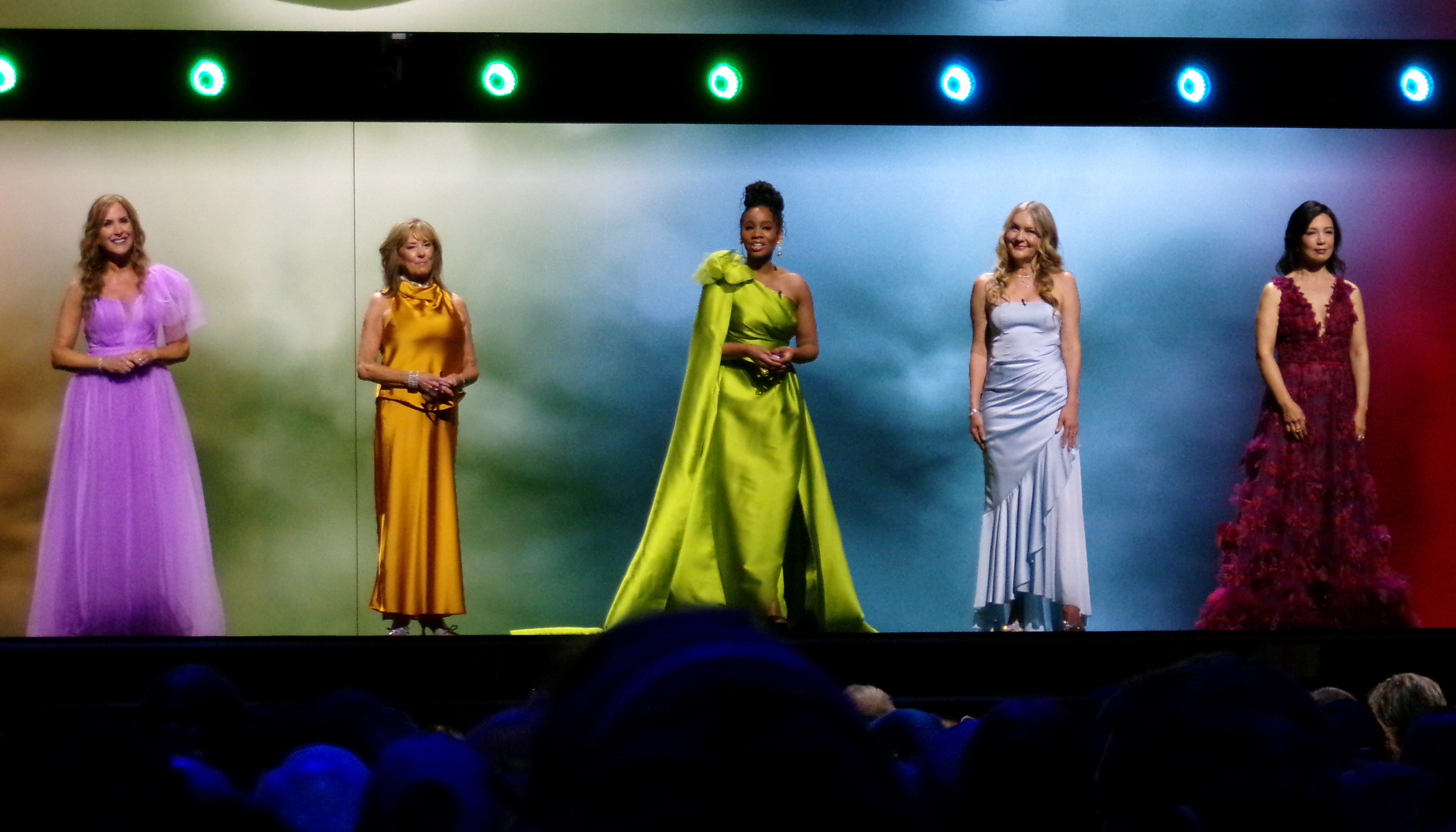
Jodi Benson, Paige O'Hara, Anika Noni Rose, Linda Larkin, and Ming-Na Wen at the 2024 D23 Disney Legends ceremony for Mark Henn, supervising animator for Ariel, Belle, Tiana, Jasmine and Mulan

On April 27, 2021, Disney launched the "Ultimate Princess Celebration." This year-long event brought back the princesses' classic designs and included many special events, products, and performances. Pop singer Brandy released a new single, "Starting Now," as the official anthem of the celebration. Despite not being official, Anna and Elsa from the Frozen franchise were included in parts of the celebration; they were removed from their temporary inclusion in the collection at the end of August 2022. When the celebration launched in South Africa on April 29, 2021, Sofia from Sofia the First and Elena from Elena of Avalor were also included in its territory, though in a lesser capacity than the other princesses. On August 23 of the same year, Disney announced World Princess Week, as part of the "Ultimate Princess Celebration."

In January 2022, Mattel regained the license to produce lines of toys and dolls for the brand.

== Criteria ==
To be included in the Disney Princess line, a character must be a protagonist or main supporting character in an animated theatrical film produced by a studio owned by the Walt Disney Company that is the first film in its franchise (thus excluding characters introduced in sequels, direct-to-video films, and television series), must be human in her standard form and in general should be a princess by way of either marriage to a prince or through herself descending from a monarch or tribal chief. Exceptionally heroic characters who do not have a royal title can also be included.

Marketability is a key factor in whether a character is chosen for inclusion in the line. Characters from unsuccessful Disney franchises are not generally considered. In the case of Anna and Elsa, they are eligible by Disney standards, but have only sporadically been included (particularly in the aforementioned expanded "Ultimate Princess" line) because the standalone success of the Frozen franchise has made bundling them into the line unnecessary.

== List of Disney Princesses ==
The official lineup of Disney Princesses consists of the female protagonists from thirteen selected Disney films, most of whom have royal ties within their fictional universes. They were given an official number in the franchise line-up based on the chronological order in which their films were released, starting with Snow White as the first and original Disney Princess, and Cinderella as the second, followed by Aurora, and so on.

=== Current members ===
No.	Name	Film	Synopsis	Voiced by	Notes
1	Snow White	Snow White and the Seven Dwarfs (1937)	Snow White is the princess of a kingdom whose beauty and kindness rival her stepmother, the Evil Queen. Consumed by jealousy, the Queen orders a huntsman to kill Snow White, but he spares her life. Snow White flees into the forest, where she discovers the home of seven dwarfs—Doc, Grumpy, Happy, Sleepy, Bashful, Sneezy, and Dopey—who welcome her and offer protection. Despite her refuge, the Evil Queen discovers Snow White is still alive and disguises herself to give Snow White a poisoned apple. Snow White is placed in a deep sleep upon taking a bite. She can only be awakened by true love's kiss, which eventually comes from a prince who had fallen in love with her at first sight. Snow White awakens, the Queen is defeated, and Snow White and the Prince live happily ever after.	Adriana Caselotti	Added with the creation of the franchise in 2000.
2	Cinderella	Cinderella (1950)	Cinderella is a young woman who lives with her wicked stepmother and two stepsisters, who treat her as a servant in her own home. Despite her difficult circumstances, Cinderella remains gentle, hopeful, and dreams of a better life. With the help of her Fairy Godmother, Cinderella is magically transformed for one night to attend the royal ball. She captivates the Prince with her beauty and charm, but must leave at midnight, leaving behind a single glass slipper. Determined to find the mysterious girl, the Prince searches the kingdom. Eventually, the slipper fits Cinderella perfectly, and she is reunited with the Prince. Cinderella's kindness and perseverance are rewarded as she marries the Prince and lives happily ever after.	Ilene Woods	Added with the creation of the franchise in 2000.
3	Aurora	Sleeping Beauty (1959)	Aurora is born to King Stefan and Queen Leah. At her christening, an evil fairy named Maleficent curses her to die on her sixteenth birthday by pricking her finger on a spinning wheel's spindle before sunset. Three good fairies—Flora, Fauna, and Merryweather—raise Aurora in secrecy in a forest cottage to protect her from the curse, which was changed from death to sleep by Merryweather. Despite their protection, Aurora encounters Maleficent and pricks her finger on the spinning wheel's spindle, placing her in her foretold sleep. She can only be awakened by true love's kiss. Prince Phillip, whom she had met earlier in the forest, bravely confronts Maleficent and awakens Aurora with a kiss, breaking the curse. Aurora and Phillip marry, and peace is restored to the kingdom.	Mary Costa	Added with the creation of the franchise in 2000.
4	Ariel	The Little Mermaid (1989)	Ariel is a young mermaid, the daughter of King Triton, ruler of Atlantica. Fascinated by the human world, she collects human artifacts and dreams of living on land. Her curiosity leads her to make a dangerous deal with the sea witch Ursula: in exchange for her voice, Ariel will become human for three days to win the love of Prince Eric. With the help of her friends—Sebastian the crab, Flounder the fish, and Scuttle the seagull—Ariel navigates the challenges of the human world. Ursula's schemes threaten her happiness, but Ariel's courage and determination, along with Eric's love, ultimately defeat Ursula. Ariel regains her voice, and her father grants her wish to live on land. She marries Eric, uniting the human and mermaid worlds.	Jodi Benson	Added with the creation of the franchise in 2000.
5	Belle	Beauty and the Beast (1991)	Belle is a bright and independent young woman living in a small village. She dreams of adventure beyond her provincial life and is often misunderstood by the villagers for her unconventional interests and intelligence. When her father Maurice is captured by a fearsome Beast, Belle bravely offers herself in his place as the Beast's prisoner. The Beast, who is actually Prince Adam cursed by an enchantress for his arrogance, must learn to love and earn love in return to break the spell. Over time, Belle sees past his fearsome appearance to his kind and noble heart. Through shared experiences, courage, and compassion, Belle and the Beast develop a deep bond. When the curse is broken, the Beast transforms back into Prince Adam, and they marry, uniting love, understanding, and mutual respect.	Paige O'Hara	Added with the creation of the franchise in 2000.
6	Jasmine	Aladdin (1992)	Jasmine is the princess of Agrabah, a vibrant desert kingdom. Feeling confined by palace life and the pressures of royal expectations, she longs for freedom and the chance to make her own choices. When she meets Aladdin, a "diamond in the rough" street-smart young man, she is drawn to his courage and kindness rather than his social status. Together, Jasmine and Aladdin confront the evil sorcerer Jafar, who seeks to seize the throne and marry her for power. Through bravery, quick thinking, and love, Jasmine helps protect Agrabah and its people. She ultimately chooses to marry Aladdin, having found true love based on mutual respect and shared values.	Linda Larkin	Added with the creation of the franchise in 2000.
7	Pocahontas	Pocahontas (1995)	Pocahontas is the daughter of Chief Powhatan and a Native American woman of the Powhatan tribe. Curious, brave, and free-spirited, she explores the wilderness around her village and seeks harmony between her people and the natural world. When English settlers, including Captain John Smith, arrive in her homeland, tensions arise between the two cultures. Pocahontas befriends John Smith and helps mediate peace, teaching both sides about understanding, respect, and coexistence. Through her courage and wisdom, she helps prevent conflict and inspires others to embrace empathy and harmony with nature.	Irene Bedard	Added with the creation of the franchise in 2000.
8	Mulan	Mulan (1998)	Mulan is a young Chinese woman who struggles with traditional expectations placed upon her as a daughter in her family. When the Emperor issues a decree that one man from each family must join the army to defend China from invading Huns, Mulan disguises herself as a man to take her aging father's place. Training alongside the soldiers, Mulan proves herself to be courageous, resourceful, and strategic, ultimately saving the Emperor and the entire country. Her true identity is revealed, but instead of shame, she is honored for her bravery. Mulan reunites with her family and is admired by all, including Captain Li Shang, who respects and admires her courage and character.	Ming-Na Wen	Added with the creation of the franchise in 2000.
9	Tiana	The Princess and the Frog (2009)	Tiana is a hardworking young woman in New Orleans who dreams of opening her own restaurant. Focused and independent, she values ambition and self-reliance. Her life takes a magical turn when she kisses Prince Naveen, who has been transformed into a frog by a wicked voodoo doctor. Instead of breaking his curse, Tiana herself is turned into a frog. Together, Tiana and Naveen navigate the bayous of Louisiana, facing challenges, magical creatures, and learning important lessons about love, trust, and following one's dreams. By the end, Tiana achieves her goal of owning her restaurant and breaks the curse, marrying Naveen, and living happily ever after.	Anika Noni Rose	Officially added in 2010.
10	Rapunzel	Tangled (2010)	Rapunzel is a young princess kidnapped as a baby by Mother Gothel, who keeps her in a secluded tower to exploit the magical healing powers of Rapunzel's hair. Despite her captivity, Rapunzel remains curious, spirited, and dreams of leaving the tower to explore the outside world and see the floating lanterns she has admired since childhood. Her life changes when she meets Flynn Rider, a charming thief who hides in her tower while escaping from the palace guards. Together, they embark on a journey filled with adventure, self-discovery, and romance. Rapunzel learns the truth about her royal heritage, confronts Mother Gothel, and reunites with her real parents, reclaiming her identity as the lost princess.	Mandy Moore	Officially added in 2011.
11	Merida	Brave (2012)	Merida is the headstrong princess of the Scottish kingdom of Dunbroch, daughter of King Fergus and Queen Elinor. Preferring adventure and freedom over tradition, she resists the expectations of royal life, including an arranged marriage meant to unite her kingdom with neighboring clans. After a heated argument with her mother, Merida seeks help from a witch, unintentionally transforming her mother into a bear. Merida must then embark on a courageous journey to reverse the spell and repair the bond with her mother. Through bravery, cleverness, and determination, she learns the value of understanding, responsibility, and self-discovery.	Kelly Macdonald	Officially added in 2013.
12	Moana	Moana (2016)	Moana is the daughter of Chief Tui and the heir to the chiefdom of Motunui, a Polynesian island. From a young age, she feels a deep connection to the ocean and dreams of exploring beyond the reef, despite her father's insistence on staying within the safety of the island. When the island faces environmental decline due to a curse caused by the demigod Maui stealing the heart of Te Fiti, Moana sets out on a daring voyage to restore it. Along the way, she befriends Maui, confronts challenges at sea, and learns to embrace her own leadership and identity. By returning the heart to Te Fiti, Moana restores balance to her island and earns her place as a wise and courageous leader.	Auliʻi Cravalho	Officially added in 2019.
13	Raya	Raya and the Last Dragon (2021)	Raya is a skilled warrior and the daughter of Chief Benja, leader of the land of Kumandra. When an ancient evil known as the Druun threatens her world, Raya embarks on a quest to find the last dragon, Sisu, in order to restore peace and harmony. Along the way, she faces betrayal, overcomes challenges, and learns the importance of trust, unity, and teamwork. Through courage, perseverance, and compassion, Raya ultimately brings together the divided tribes of Kumandra and defeats the Druun, restoring balance and harmony to her world.	Kelly Marie Tran	Officially added in 2023.

=== Former members ===
Name	Film	Synopsis	Voiced by	Notes
Tinker Bell	Peter Pan (1953)	Tinker Bell is a devoted fairy companion to Peter Pan in Neverland. She is fiercely loyal, courageous, and often outspoken, though sometimes jealous or mischievous. Her magic allows others to fly, and she frequently aids Peter and the Lost Boys in their adventures, defending Neverland from Captain Hook and other threats.	—N/a	Added with the creation of the franchise in 2000; reassigned to the Disney Fairies franchise in 2005.
Esmeralda	The Hunchback of Notre Dame (1996)	Esmeralda is a spirited Romani woman living in Paris who fights for the rights of her people while captivating the city with her dancing and charm. She befriends Quasimodo, the kindhearted bell ringer of Notre Dame, and stands up against the corrupt Judge Frollo, who oppresses the Romani and plots to harm her. Through courage, wit, and determination, Esmeralda challenges injustice, protects her friends, and inspires others to fight for equality and freedom. Her compassion and bravery ultimately help bring change to the city and save those she loves.	Demi Moore	Added with the creation of the franchise in 2000; removed in 2005.

== Disney Parks & Resorts live experiences ==
Collapsible Summary Table^{1}
Area	Park/Resort	Location		Featured Princess(es)
Area	Park/Resort	Name	Type	Featured Princess(es)
(United States) (California) Disneyland Resort Anaheim Resort, Anaheim, CA, US	Disneyland	Royal Hall	Greeting	Snow White, Cinderella, Aurora, Ariel, Belle, Jasmine, Mulan, Tiana, Rapunzel, Merida
(United States) (California) Disneyland Resort Anaheim Resort, Anaheim, CA, US	Disneyland	Snow White Grotto	Greeting	Snow White, Cinderella, Aurora, Ariel, Belle, Jasmine, Tiana, Rapunzel
(United States) (California) Disneyland Resort Anaheim Resort, Anaheim, CA, US	Disneyland	Frontierland	Greeting	Pocahontas
(United States) (California) Disneyland Resort Anaheim Resort, Anaheim, CA, US	Disneyland	New Orleans Square	Greeting	Tiana
(United States) (California) Disneyland Resort Anaheim Resort, Anaheim, CA, US	Disneyland	It's a Small World Mall	Greeting	Ariel (2023 live-action version)
(United States) (California) Disneyland Resort Anaheim Resort, Anaheim, CA, US	Disney California Adventure	Napa Rose (Breakfast only)	Dining/Greeting	All of them
(United States) (California) Disneyland Resort Anaheim Resort, Anaheim, CA, US	Disney's Grand Californian Hotel & Spa	Grizzly Peak	Greeting	Raya
(United States) (Florida) Walt Disney World Bay Lake, Orlando, FL, US	Magic Kingdom	Princess Fairytale Hall	Greeting	All of them
(United States) (Florida) Walt Disney World Bay Lake, Orlando, FL, US	Magic Kingdom	Cinderella's Royal Table	Dining/Greeting	Cinderella, Snow White, Aurora, Ariel, Jasmine, Rapunzel
(United States) (Florida) Walt Disney World Bay Lake, Orlando, FL, US	Magic Kingdom	Enchanted Tales with Belle	Show/Greeting	Belle
(United States) (Florida) Walt Disney World Bay Lake, Orlando, FL, US	Magic Kingdom	Ariel's Grotto	Greeting	Ariel
(United States) (Florida) Walt Disney World Bay Lake, Orlando, FL, US	Magic Kingdom	Town Square	Greeting	Snow White
(United States) (Florida) Walt Disney World Bay Lake, Orlando, FL, US	Magic Kingdom	Liberty Square Gazebo	Greeting	Merida
(United States) (Florida) Walt Disney World Bay Lake, Orlando, FL, US	Magic Kingdom	Agrabah Bazaar	Greeting	Jasmine
(United States) (Florida) Walt Disney World Bay Lake, Orlando, FL, US	Epcot	Akershus Royal Banquet Hall	Dining/Greeting	All of them
(United States) (Florida) Walt Disney World Bay Lake, Orlando, FL, US	Epcot	France Pavilion	Greeting	Aurora, Belle
(United States) (Florida) Walt Disney World Bay Lake, Orlando, FL, US	Epcot	Germany Pavilion	Greeting	Snow White
(United States) (Florida) Walt Disney World Bay Lake, Orlando, FL, US	Epcot	Morocco Pavilion	Greeting	Jasmine
(United States) (Florida) Walt Disney World Bay Lake, Orlando, FL, US	Epcot	China Pavilion	Greeting	Mulan
(United States) (Florida) Walt Disney World Bay Lake, Orlando, FL, US	Epcot	Journey of Water	Experience/Greeting	Moana
(United States) (Florida) Walt Disney World Bay Lake, Orlando, FL, US	Disney's Hollywood Studios	Beauty and the Beast – Live on Stage	Show	Belle
(United States) (Florida) Walt Disney World Bay Lake, Orlando, FL, US	Disney's Hollywood Studios	The Little Mermaid – A Musical Adventure	Show	Ariel
(United States) (Florida) Walt Disney World Bay Lake, Orlando, FL, US	Disney's Hollywood Studios	Walt Disney Presents	Greeting	Ariel (2023 live-action version)
(United States) (Florida) Walt Disney World Bay Lake, Orlando, FL, US	Disney's Animal Kingdom	Discovery Island	Greeting	Pocahontas, Moana
(United States) (Florida) Walt Disney World Bay Lake, Orlando, FL, US	Disney's Grand Floridian Resort & Spa	1900 Park Fare	Dining/Greeting	Cinderella, Tiana
(United States) (Florida) Walt Disney World Bay Lake, Orlando, FL, US	Disney's Grand Floridian Resort & Spa	Garden View Tea Room^{2} (Breakfast only)	Dining/Greeting	Aurora
(United States) (Florida) Walt Disney World Bay Lake, Orlando, FL, US	Disney's Wilderness Lodge	Artist Point	Dining/Greeting	Snow White
(United States) (Florida) Walt Disney World Bay Lake, Orlando, FL, US	Disney's BoardWalk Resort	Trattoria al Forno^{2} (Breakfast only)	Dining/Greeting	Ariel, Rapunzel
Tokyo Disney Resort Urayasu, Chiba, Japan	Tokyo Disneyland	World Bazaar	Greeting	Snow White, Cinderella, Aurora, Belle, Rapunzel
Tokyo Disney Resort Urayasu, Chiba, Japan	Tokyo Disneyland	Fantasyland	Greeting	Snow White, Cinderella, Belle, Rapunzel
Tokyo Disney Resort Urayasu, Chiba, Japan	Tokyo Disneyland	Critter Country	Greeting	Pocahontas
Tokyo Disney Resort Urayasu, Chiba, Japan	Tokyo DisneySea	Arabian Coast	Greeting	Jasmine
Tokyo Disney Resort Urayasu, Chiba, Japan	Tokyo DisneySea	Mermaid Lagoon	Greeting	Ariel
Disneyland Paris Marne-la-Vallée/Chessy, Paris, Île-de-France, France	Disneyland Park (Paris)	Princess Pavilion	Greeting	Snow White, Cinderella, Aurora, Ariel, Belle, Jasmine, Mulan, Tiana, Rapunzel, Merida
Disneyland Paris Marne-la-Vallée/Chessy, Paris, Île-de-France, France	Disneyland Park (Paris)	L'Auberge de Cendrillon	Dining/Greeting	Snow White, Cinderella, Aurora, Ariel, Belle, Jasmine, Mulan, Tiana, Rapunzel, Merida
Disneyland Paris Marne-la-Vallée/Chessy, Paris, Île-de-France, France	Disneyland Hotel	La Table de Lumière	Dining/Greeting	Snow White, Cinderella, Aurora, Ariel, Belle, Jasmine, Tiana
Hong Kong Disneyland Resort Penny's Bay, Lantau Island, Hong Kong, China	Hong Kong Disneyland	Royal Reception Hall	Greeting	Random
Hong Kong Disneyland Resort Penny's Bay, Lantau Island, Hong Kong, China	Hong Kong Disneyland	Adventureland	Greeting	Jasmine, Mulan, Moana
Hong Kong Disneyland Resort Penny's Bay, Lantau Island, Hong Kong, China	Hong Kong Disneyland	Frontierland	Greeting	Pocahontas, Tiana
Shanghai Disney Resort Pudong, Shanghai, China	Shanghai Disneyland	Adventure Isle	Greeting	Raya
Shanghai Disney Resort Pudong, Shanghai, China	Shanghai Disneyland	Storybook Court	Greeting	Random
(United States) (Hawaii) Aulani Ko Olina Resort, Kapolei, Oahu, HI, US		Aunty's Beach House	Experience/Greeting	Moana

^{1} Current as of April 14, 2024.
^{2} Denotes an experience yet to resume following the COVID-19 pandemic.
Does not include shows or parades featuring characters across the Disney franchises/IPs.

=== Disneyland ===
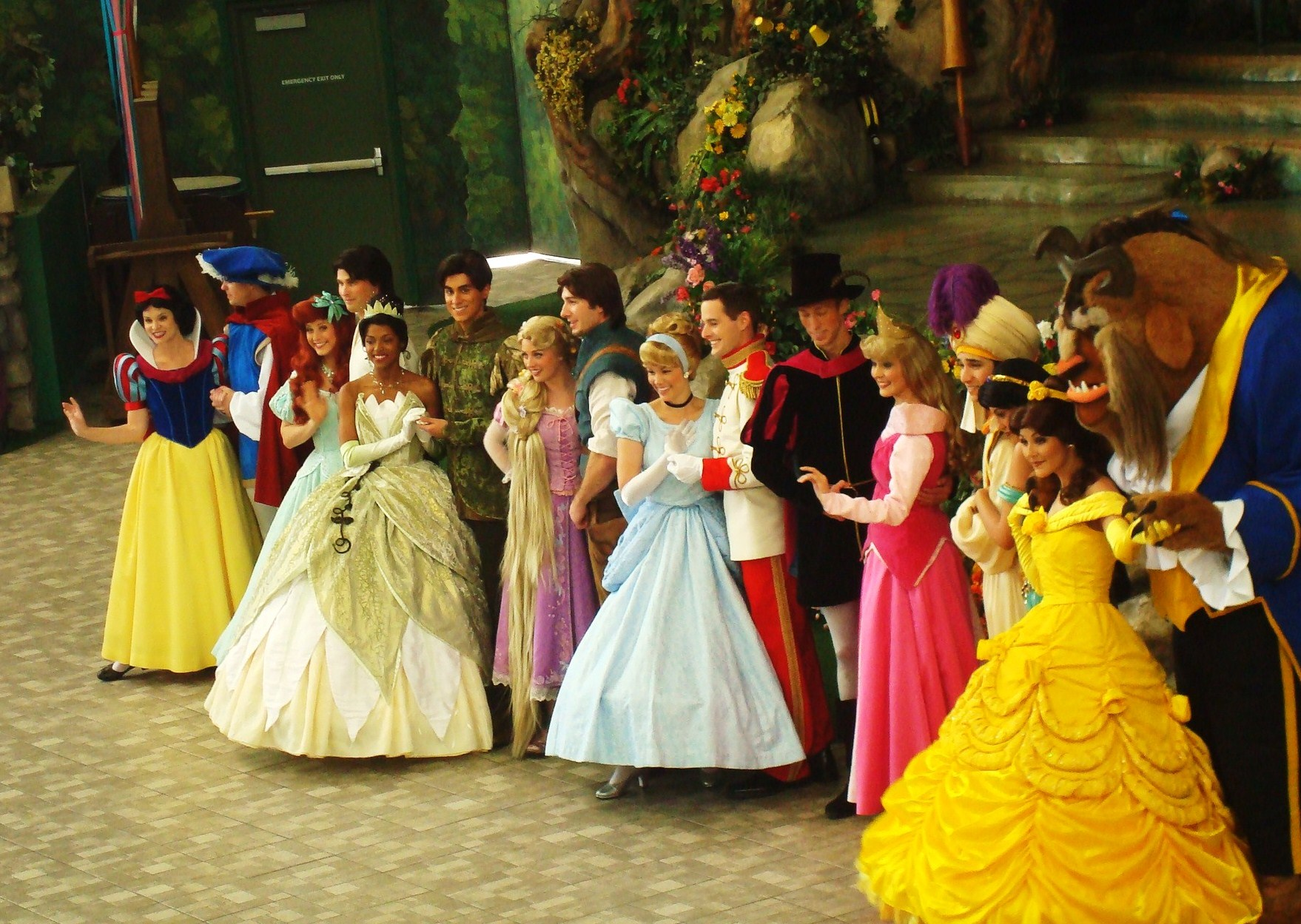
From left to right: Snow White, the Prince; Ariel, Prince Eric; Tiana, Prince Naveen; Rapunzel, Flynn Rider; Cinderella, Prince Charming; Prince Phillip, Aurora; Aladdin (as Prince Ali), Jasmine; Belle, and the Beast (before returning to his human form) on February 14, 2012

All the princesses are available for meet-and-greets at Disneyland Resort in California. Additionally, in 2006, as part of the "Year of Million Dreams" celebration, the Fantasyland Theater began hosting the Disneyland Princess Fantasy Faire, a show featuring "Lords" and "Ladies" who taught young boys and girls the proper etiquette to be a Prince or Princess and featured appearances from the Disney Princesses. In 2010, Rapunzel was given a Tangled meet-and-greet location. The Carnation Plaza Gardens bandstand, adjacent to Sleeping Beauty Castle, was closed to replace a new Fantasy Faire area in the Spring of 2013.

==== Fantasy Faire ====
Fantasy Faire

Disneyland
- Area: Fantasyland
- Status: Operating
- Opening date: March 3, 2013
- Replaced: Carnation Plaza Gardens
- Website: Fantasy Faire

Magic Kingdom
- Name: Princess Fairytale Hall
- Area: Fantasyland
- Status: Operating
- Opening date: September 18, 2013
- Replaced: Snow White's Scary Adventures
- Website: Princess Fairytale Hall

Shanghai Disneyland
- Name: Storybook Court
- Area: Fantasyland
- Status: Operating
- Soft opening date: May 7, 2016
- Opening date: June 16, 2016
- Website: Storybook Court

Hong Kong Disneyland
- Name: The Royal Reception Hall
- Area: Fantasyland
- Status: Operating
- Soft opening date: December 13, 2017 (temporary)
- Opening date: December 14, 2017 (temporary); November 21, 2020 (reopened)
- Website: The Royal Reception Hall

Disneyland Park (Paris)
- Name: Princess Pavilion
- Area: Fantasyland
- Status: Operating
- Website: Princess Pavilion

Ride statistics
- Attraction type: Meet-and-greet location
- Theme: Gothic-inspired village & fair

The Fantasy Faire area at Disneyland officially opened on March 12, 2013, as the permanent home for the Disney Princesses, consisting of a Royal Hall, a Royal Theatre, Maurice's Treats food cart, and a Fairytale Treasures gift shop. The theater features two small shows based on Beauty and the Beast and Tangled. The hall is used for meet and greets with the princesses, which have a rotation schedule with three princesses scheduled to appear at a time.

==== Character dining ====
The current Princess character dining offering at Disneyland is the "Disney Princess Breakfast Adventure" at Napa Rose at Disney's Grand Californian Hotel & Spa.

=== Walt Disney World ===
At Walt Disney World, the Princesses are available for meet-and-greets in more specific locations. Character dining for multiple Princesses is located at Cinderella's Royal Table at Cinderella Castle at the Magic Kingdom and at Akershus Royal Banquet Hall, which is named after Akershus Fortress in Oslo and is set inside a partial recreation of the fortress/castle at the Norway Pavilion at Epcot. Snow White, Dopey, Grumpy, and the Queen can also be met at "Story Book Dining at Artist Point with Snow White" at Artist Point at Disney's Wilderness Lodge. Before the COVID-19 pandemic, Ariel and Rapunzel, along with Prince Eric and Flynn Rider, could also be met at the "Bon Voyage Adventure Breakfast" at Trattoria al Forno at Disney's BoardWalk Resort, but it is yet to resume. Similarly, the Perfectly Princess Tea party at the Garden View Tea Room at Disney's Grand Floridian Resort & Spa featuring Aurora is also yet to resume following the pandemic. In April 2024, 1900 Park Fare at the same resort reopened with "Wish Makers Enchanted Dining" featuring Cinderella and Tiana, among others, including Aladdin and Mirabel (from Encanto) after having previously hosted "Cinderella's Happily Ever After Dinner" (formerly known as the "Cinderella's Gala Feast Dinner") featuring Cinderella, Prince Charming, Anastasia, and Drizella before the pandemic.

Several Princesses are also found in their respective pavilions around the Epcot World Showcase, such as Snow White in Germany, Mulan in China, and Belle and Aurora in France. On September 18, 2013, a meet-and-greet attraction called Princess Fairytale Hall opened in Fantasyland at the Magic Kingdom behind Cinderella Castle.

=== Disneyland Paris ===
A meet-and-greet location for a single Disney Princess is located at the Princess Pavilion near It's a Small World. In addition, Paris' Disneyland Park also hosts a Disney Princess character restaurant, L'Auberge de Cendrillon (Cinderella's Inn), beside Le Château de la Belle au Bois Dormant (Sleeping Beauty's Castle) in a building similar to a classic French inn and resembling Cinderella's Castle from the film. Since 2023, princesses and their princes have greeted guests at the character restaurant La Table de Lumière (Lumière's Table) in the Disneyland Hotel.

=== Shanghai Disneyland ===
A Disney Princess meet-and-greet location called Storybook Court is located at Enchanted Storybook Castle.

=== Hong Kong Disneyland ===
Hong Kong Disneyland's Castle of Magical Dreams has a meet-and-greet location being The Royal Reception Hall for the Disney Princesses.

=== Aulani ===
The Aulani Disney Vacation Club resort at the Ko Olina Resort in Hawaii also hosts Kakamora Chaos with Moana at Aunty's Beach House, its kids club. The experience includes traditional Hawaiian children's games as well as the Kakamora Relay from her homeland of Motunui.

== Media ==
=== Films and television ===
Princess Party Palace (formerly known as The Princess Power Hour) was a programming block on Toon Disney from 2000 until 2007. It used to air episodes of The Little Mermaid and Aladdin.

The Disney Princesses' television appearances were compiled into the Disney Princess Collection, a series of compilation VHS cassettes containing episodes from The Little Mermaid and Aladdin, as well as two Beauty and the Beast specials. A later DVD series, Disney Princess Stories, featured content similar to the previous release.

Belle had her live-action television series, Sing Me a Story with Belle. The first eight Disney Princesses also appeared on the animated TV series, House of Mouse. Cinderella, Belle, and Snow White also made cameo appearances in the TV animated series, Mickey Mouse. The television special The Little Mermaid Live! starred Auliʻi Cravalho as Ariel. The 2022 TV special Beauty and the Beast: A 30th Celebration starred H.E.R. as Belle.

In 2006, a bonus feature included on the Disney Princess Sing-Along Songs Volume 3 DVD teased a new series of direct-to-video films with original stories entitled Disney Princess Fairy Tales. The first film Disney Princess Fairy Tales: A Kingdom of Kindness which was scheduled for released in September 2006, was to feature story segments with Aurora and Belle. By February 2007, Disney renamed the series as Disney Princess Enchanted Tales, and revealed the first film would feature segments with Aurora, Belle and Jasmine. In March 2007, the Belle segment was revealed to be excluded from the premiere film, which was renamed Follow Your Dreams. The first film in the series, was released on September 4, 2007. It is a musical film featuring a new tale about Jasmine and the first new tale about Aurora since the original Sleeping Beauty. Originally, A Kingdom of Kindness contained a different Aurora story and had a Belle story rather than a Jasmine story. Disney made this change without any sort of notice.

A second installment in the series, titled Honesty, featuring new stories with Cinderella and Mulan, was planned to be released in February 2008. Merchandise for the second film began production, starting with children's books, though they never released. The series was cancelled, and only Follow Your Dreams exists.

The TV series Once Upon a Time, which aired on ABC, featured live-action versions of Snow White, Cinderella, Belle, Aurora, Mulan, Ariel, Rapunzel, Merida, Jasmine and Tiana. Snow White and Belle are the main characters, while the rest make recurring or guest appearances. Beginning in season 7, Cinderella, Tiana and Rapunzel are the main characters. Many of these characters are patterned after their Disney counterparts, but a few drew inspiration from older stories.

In the TV series Sofia the First, which premiered on Disney Junior on January 11, 2013, Princess Sofia (voiced by Ariel Winter) can summon the Disney Princesses. Cinderella appeared in the pilot film, Once Upon A Princess. Jasmine, Belle, Aurora, Snow White, Mulan, Tiana, and Merida appeared on the show as guest appearances. Ariel and Rapunzel appeared in the TV specials, The Floating Palace and The Curse of Princess Ivy, respectively. The sequel series, Sofia the First: Royal Magic, will have Moana appearing as a guest in the series, along with Rapunzel, Cinderella, Aurora, and Jasmine making returning guest appearances.

In 2017, the TV series Rapunzel's Tangled Adventure debuted with the television film Tangled: Before Ever After serving as the pilot—with Mandy Moore reprising her voice role as Rapunzel. In December 2020, it was originally announced that Tiana and Moana would have spin-off TV shows, both airing on Disney+, with Moana: The Series debuting in 2024 and Tiana set for a later date. However, in February 2024, Moana: The Series was transformed into Moana 2, which was released on November 27, 2024, and in March 2025, Tiana was announced to be cancelled and no longer moving forward as a series.

In the films Maleficent and Maleficent: Mistress of Evil, Elle Fanning plays Aurora. Lily James portrays Cinderella in the eponymous 2015 film. Emma Watson is seen as Belle in the 2017 film Beauty and the Beast. Naomi Scott stars as Jasmine in the 2019 film Aladdin. Liu Yifei appears as Mulan in the eponymous 2020 film. Halle Bailey plays Ariel in the 2023 film The Little Mermaid. Rachel Zegler portrays the title character in the 2025 film Snow White. Catherine Laga'aia stars as Moana in the eponymous 2026 film. Teagan Croft has been cast as Rapunzel in the 2028 film Tangled.

In the 2018 film Ralph Breaks the Internet, Vanellope von Schweetz meets the Disney Princesses, along with Anna and Elsa (and Moana, who was not included in the line-up until the following year), in short guest appearances. This film marks the first direct interaction between the characters in an animated Disney feature. Rich Moore and Phil Johnston, the directors of Ralph Breaks the Internet, said that a film focusing on the Disney Princesses could be made depending on the audience's response and "if there's a good story to be told."

In 2021, Disney Channel began to air shorts in the Chibi Tiny Tales series, a loose follow-up to Big Chibi 6 The Shorts, based on the Disney Princess franchise. The first episode, "Moana As Told By Chibi," was released on August 27, 2021.

An animated Lego special, Lego Disney Princess: The Castle Quest, was released on Disney+ on August 18, 2023. The special stars Snow White, Ariel, Tiana, Rapunzel, and Moana, in an adventure to stop the evil plans of Gaston (the main antagonist of Beauty and the Beast). A second special, Lego Disney Princess: Villains Unite, was released on Disney+ on August 25, 2025. The Princesses of the previous special return in this sequel, with the addition of Cinderella, Aurora, and Belle, again trying to stop the plans of Gaston, along with his new villain allies. A third special, Lego Disney Princess: Magical Mayhem, was released on Disney+ on August 21, 2026, again featuring Snow White, Ariel, Rapunzel, and Moana, and introducing Jasmine and Mulan.

The characters of the franchise, excluding Merida, appeared in the 2023 short film Once Upon a Studio in celebration of Disney's 100th anniversary.

=== Literature ===
==== Disney Princess chapter books ====
- Ariel: The Birthday Surprise
- Belle: The Mysterious Message
- Cinderella: The Great Mouse Mistake
- Tiana: The Grand Opening
- Jasmine: The Missing Coin
- Aurora: The Perfect Party
- Rapunzel: A Day to Remember

==== A Jewel Story ====
- Ariel: The Shimmering Star Necklace
- Cinderella: The Lost Tiara
- Belle: The Charming Gift
- Jasmine: The Jewel Orchard
- Tiana: The Stolen Jewel
- Merida: Legend of the Emeralds

=== Comics ===
In Kilala Princess, a Japanese fantasy/romance manga produced by Kodansha that debuted on Nakayoshi in April 2005, a girl named Kilala and her adventures to find her kidnapped friend with the help of the first six Disney Princesses (Snow White, Cinderella, Aurora, Ariel, Belle, and Jasmine). However, Kilala herself is not considered part of the franchise.

On February 24, 2016, a Disney Princesses anthology ongoing comic book's first issue hit the stands. The series is published by Joe Books, which expanded Disney Princess to a graphic novel line as an exclusive for Target along with a Hasbro figure line and a Hybrid Promotions apparel line.

=== Video games ===
Disney Princesses have appeared in various other media, such as video games, including Disney Princess for Game Boy Advance, Enchanted Journey, Magical Jewels, and My Fairytale Adventure.

Rapunzel can be found as a playable character in the 2013 game Disney Infinity, like with the rest of the playable characters being released a figure of her. Disney Infinity 2.0 has the addition of Jasmine and Merida. In the case of Merida, being included with Stitch in the Toy Box Starter Pack for the game. Disney Infinity 3.0 has the addition of Mulan.

All Disney Princesses are also playable characters in the mobile game Disney Magic Kingdoms, with Cinderella, Aurora, Pocahontas, and Rapunzel being part of the main storyline, while the rest are limited time characters. The game also includes Princess Fairytale Hall as an attraction.

Almost all the Disney Princesses, with the exception of Pocahontas, were included as playable characters in the role-playing game Disney Mirrorverse.

Almost all the Disney Princesses, with the exception of Raya, appear as villagers in Disney Dreamlight Valley. Cinderella, Ariel, Belle, Jasmine, Pocahontas, Mulan, Tiana, and Moana are part of the main base game, while Snow White, Aurora, Rapunzel, and Merida are available through DLCs with game expansions.

Almost all the Disney Princesses, with the exception of Pocahontas and Raya, are all playable characters in the kart racing game Disney Speedstorm.

==== Kingdom Hearts ====
In the Kingdom Hearts game series, the seven "Princesses of Heart" are young maidens with entirely pure hearts who can open the way to Kingdom Hearts if gathered together. Five of these maidens include Snow White, Cinderella, Aurora, Belle, and Jasmine. The remaining Princesses of Heart are Alice from Alice in Wonderland and series-original character Kairi. Introduced in Kingdom Hearts (2002), the Princesses of Heart make subsequent appearances in Kingdom Hearts: Chain of Memories (2004), Kingdom Hearts II (2005), Kingdom Hearts Coded (2008), Kingdom Hearts 358/2 Days (2009), and Kingdom Hearts Birth by Sleep (2010). Ariel and Mulan are not Princesses of Heart; they are instead guest party members in Kingdom Hearts and Kingdom Hearts II respectively.

Kingdom Hearts III (2019) introduces the "New Seven Hearts," a new set of princesses inheriting the roles from the previous princesses. Kairi, Rapunzel, Anna, and Elsa are known to be among the New Seven Hearts, with the other three currently being unknown.

== Awards and recognition ==
By 2022, five Disney Princess films had been selected for preservation in the National Film Registry by the Library of Congress for being "culturally, historically, or aesthetically significant":

- Snow White and the Seven Dwarfs (1937; added in 1989)
- Beauty and the Beast (1991; added in 2002)
- Cinderella (1950; added in 2018)
- Sleeping Beauty (1959; added in 2019)
- The Little Mermaid (1989; added in 2022)
