= Disney Princess: Enchanted Journey =

2007 video game

- North American PS2 box art
- Developer: Papaya Studio
- Publisher: Disney Interactive Studios
- Director: Stephen Jarrett
- Producers: Jonathan Hall; Sandy Abe
- Designers: Derek Dutilly; Stephen Jarrett; Kurt Loudy
- Programmers: Laurent Horisberger; Greg McBride; Karl Lai
- Artists: Vincent Perea; Jay Riddle; Janry Burns
- Composer: Mark Watters
- Platforms: PlayStation 2, Wii, Windows, PlayStation Network
- Release: Wii, Windows: EU: October 16, 2007; NA: October 30, 2007; JP: December 6, 2007; PlayStation 2: WW: November 7, 2007; PlayStation Network: EU: February 15, 2012
- Genre: Action-adventure
- Modes: Single-player, multiplayer

Disney Princess: Enchanted Journey, released in Japan as Disney Princess: To the Magic World (ディズニープリンセス 魔法の世界へ, Dizunī Purinsesu Mahō No Sekai E), is a video game based on the Disney Princess franchise, which was released for the PlayStation 2, Wii and Windows in 2007. It was released on PlayStation Network on February 15, 2012 in Europe.

== Gameplay ==
The players can interact with various characters and solve problems by way of a magic wand that they are given at the start of the game. The players can collect gems and transform Bogs into non-threatening butterflies. As players complete each world a gem will shine in their avatar's necklace and their castle will become less run down and more fixed up.

== Plot ==
The game follows an amnesiac young girl (Isabelle Fuhrman) that is brought to a dilapidated castle called "Gentlehaven" and set on a quest to travel to the homes of various Disney Princesses and help solve problems caused by mischievous creatures called Bogs. The player travels to several worlds inhabited by Ariel (Jodi Benson), Jasmine (Linda Larkin), Cinderella (Jennifer Hale), and Snow White (Carolyn Gardner), ultimately culminating with a battle between the player and Zara - an ex-princess who is trying to stop every girl from becoming a princess. After successfully defeating Zara, the player is informed that she is a princess and that she can now travel to the world of Belle (Paige O'Hara) to solve additional problems.

== Reception ==
Common Sense Media and the Gainesville Sun both praised the game overall, and the Gainesville Sun commented that "while "Enchanted Journey" is only for a limited audience, young girls who follow the Disney Princess line will be thrilled with the game and really enjoy exploring the different Princess worlds. The game is easy to learn and fun to play". IGN panned the game for its rough graphics and repetitive nature, remarking that while the game would be "a good way to keep kids entertained for a couple of hours", it was not worth paying full price.
