= L'Auberge de Cendrillon =

Restaurant at Disneyland Paris

Disneyland Park (Paris)
- Area: Fantasyland
- Status: Operating
- Opening date: April 12, 1992

Ride statistics
- Attraction type: Restaurant
- Designer: Walt Disney Imagineering
- Theme: Cinderella
- Wheelchair accessible

L'Auberge de Cendrillon (French for Cinderella's Inn) is a restaurant located in Fantasyland in Disneyland Paris, which opened in 1992 with the park. It is themed to the Disney movie Cinderella.

== Design ==
The restaurant is located beside Le Château de la Belle au Bois Dormant (Sleeping Beauty Castle), in an old French inn-like building, resembling Cinderella's Château from the movie, complete with a fountain of the princess at the entrance, her pumpkin-shaped carriage, and the tower where she is locked up most of the time.

Along with the outside seating area in the garden, the building features five Renaissance-style rooms, all ornamented with pictures and tapestries depicting famous scenes from the movie. Here, guests can consume traditional French-inspired meals.

The restaurant offers character dining and menus for special diets, including vegetarian, vegan and halal.
