= So This Is Love (Cinderella song) =

Song by Ilene Woods and Mike Douglas in the 1950 animated film "Cinderella"
- Published: 1948
- Genre: Soundtrack
- Songwriters: Mack David; Al Hoffman; Jerry Livingston

"So This Is Love" is a 1948 song composed by Al Hoffman, Mack David, and Jerry Livingston. It was written for Walt Disney's Cinderella, in which it was performed by Ilene Woods and Mike Douglas. It is sung by the characters of Cinderella and Prince Charming as they dance with each other at the ball. Composed in 3/4 time (also known as waltz time), a secondary title, "The Cinderella Waltz", appears in parentheses next to or beneath the song's main name on many editions of sheet music. Prior to the Hoffman, David, and Livingston trio joining the film, songs for Cinderella were written by Larry Morey and Charles Wolcott, with a song entitled "Dancing on a Cloud" intended for the ball scene. However, their songs would be scrapped. The song does not appear in Disney's 2015 live-action adaptation of the film, replaced instead with 19th-century inspired waltzes and polkas written by cinematic composer Patrick Doyle.

Ilene Woods also commercially recorded the song with RCA Victor in 1949 to help promote the film's release the next year. It has since been performed by artists such as Vaughn Monroe, Vera Lynn, James Ingram, The Cheetah Girls, and Dave Brubeck, amongst others.

The song's copyright was registered in 1949, and renewed in 1976.

== Certifications ==
Region	Certification	Certified units/sales
United States (RIAA)	Gold	500,000^{‡}
^{‡} Sales+streaming figures based on certification alone.

== Covers ==
In 2024, American actor-singers Brandy and Paolo Montalban duetted on a cover of "So This Is Love", featured on the soundtrack to the Disney+ film Descendants: The Rise of Red in which they both appear.
