= A Disney Halloween (Walt Disney) =

- Walt Disney episode
- Episode no.: Season 28; Episode 5
- Original air date: October 24, 1981
- Running time: 60 minutes

Guest appearance
- uncredited (Magic Mirror)

"A Disney Halloween" is a 60-minute Halloween-themed episode which originally aired as part of television series Walt Disney on CBS, October 24, 1981. The special is hosted by the Magic Mirror (voiced by an uncredited actor) which incorporates segments of various villains from three Disney feature films and two classic short cartoons.

== Featured segments with the Magic Mirror ==
- The Headless Horseman - The Adventures of Ichabod and Mr. Toad (1949)
- The Evil Queen – Snow White and the Seven Dwarfs (1937)
- Trick or Treat (1952)
- Maleficent – Sleeping Beauty (1959)
- Lonesome Ghosts (1937)

== Trivia ==
- The title during the pre-show is written as "A Walt Disney Halloween."
- The announcer during the pre-show for the broadcast referred to the special as "A Walt Disney Halloween" but never by its title.

== See also ==
- "Our Unsung Villains" (1956)
- "Halloween Hall o' Fame" (1977)
- "Disney's Greatest Villains" (1977)
- "Disney's Greatest Villains" (1984)
- "Disney's Halloween Treat" (1982)
- "A Disney Halloween" (1983)
- Mickey's House of Villains (2002)
- Once Upon a Halloween (2005)
