= List of Disney villain characters =

List of villains in Disney productions, games and comic books

Disney Villains
- Logo of the franchise since 2019
- Created by: Disney Consumer Products
- Original work: Walt Disney Pictures films

Print publications
- Books: List of books
- Novels: Kingdom Keepers series; The Isle of the Lost series
- Comics: Disney Villains graphic novels

Films and television
- Films: Mickey's House of Villains; Once Upon a Halloween; Descendants; Descendants 2; Descendants 3; Descendants: The Rise of Red
- Short films: Welcome to the Club; Once Upon a Studio; The Most Wonderful Time of the Year
- Animated series: House of Mouse; Disney Twisted-Wonderland
- Television specials: Lego Disney Princess: The Castle Quest; Lego Disney Princess: Villains Unite

Games
- Traditional: Disney Villainous
- Video games: Disney's Villains' Revenge; Kingdom Hearts series; Disney Twisted-Wonderland; Disney Villains Cursed Café

Miscellaneous
- Toy: Villains Designer Collection
- Theme park attractions: Fantasmic!; Mickey's Not-So-Scary Halloween Party; Dream Along with Mickey; Villains Tonight; Disney Villains: Unfairly Ever After
- Extension: Disney's Divas of Darkness

Disney Villains is a franchise focused on various antagonists from Walt Disney Pictures productions who have been featured as part of the Disney character line-up.

Much like with the Disney Princess line with some of Disney's female lead animated characters, the characters used in the Disney Villains line are also often grouped together in the franchise, with a main focus on characters from animated films, mainly those from Walt Disney Animation Studios productions for most of its merchandising.

== List of Disney Villains ==
The characters listed here are featured in Disney productions and merchandise as "official" villains within the Disney Villains franchise.

Primary villains

These characters are seen most frequently in Disney Villains related merchandise, live events, attractions, etc. The characters are also known as "The 13 Reflections of Evil".

| Character | Origin |
|---|---|
| The Evil Queen | Snow White and the Seven Dwarfs |
| Chernabog | Fantasia |
| The Queen of Hearts | Alice in Wonderland |
| Captain Hook | Peter Pan |
| Maleficent | Sleeping Beauty |
| Cruella De Vil | 101 Dalmatians |
| Ursula | The Little Mermaid |

| Character | Origin |
|---|---|
| Gaston | Beauty and the Beast |
| Jafar | Aladdin |
| Oogie Boogie | The Nightmare Before Christmas |
| Scar | The Lion King |
| Hades | Hercules |
| Dr. Facilier | The Princess and the Frog |

Minor villains

These characters appear or have appeared in the franchise less frequently.

| Character | Origin |
|---|---|
| Pete | Mickey Mouse & Friends |
| Big Bad Wolf | Three Little Pigs |
| Magic Mirror | Snow White and the Seven Dwarfs |
| Stromboli Honest John and Gideon | Pinocchio |
| The Ringmaster | Dumbo |
| Willie the Giant | Fun and Fancy Free |
| Weasels Headless Horseman | The Adventures of Ichabod and Mr. Toad |
| Lady Tremaine Anastasia and Drizella Lucifer | Cinderella |
| King of Hearts Card Soldiers Cheshire Cat Mad Hatter | Alice in Wonderland |
| Mr. Smee | Peter Pan |
| Aunt Sarah Si and Am | Lady and the Tramp |
| Diablo | Sleeping Beauty |
| Jasper and Horace | 101 Dalmatians |
| Madam Mim | The Sword in the Stone |
| Shere Khan Kaa | The Jungle Book |
| Edgar Balthazar | The Aristocats |
| Prince John Sir Hiss Sheriff of Nottingham | Robin Hood |
| Madame Medusa | The Rescuers |
| Amos Slade | The Fox and the Hound |
| Horned King Creeper | The Black Cauldron |
| Ratigan | The Great Mouse Detective |
| Sykes | Oliver & Company |
| Flotsam and Jetsam | The Little Mermaid |
| Percival C. McLeach Joanna | The Rescuers Down Under |
| LeFou | Beauty and the Beast |
| Iago | Aladdin |
| Sanderson Sisters | Hocus Pocus |
| Shenzi, Banzai and Ed | The Lion King |
| Ratcliffe | Pocahontas |
| Sid Phillips Scud | Toy Story |
| Claude Frollo | The Hunchback of Notre Dame |

| Character | Origin |
|---|---|
| Pain and Panic | Hercules |
| Shan Yu | Mulan |
| Hopper Molt | A Bug's Life |
| The Prospector Emperor Zurg | Toy Story 2 |
| Clayton | Tarzan |
| Yzma Kronk | The Emperor's New Groove |
| Lyle Tiberius Rourke Helga Sinclair | Atlantis: The Lost Empire |
| Randall Boggs Henry J. Waternoose | Monsters, Inc. |
| Captain Gantu Jumba Jookiba Dr. Hämsterviel | Lilo & Stitch franchise |
| John Silver Scroop | Treasure Planet |
| Bruce | Finding Nemo |
| Syndrome | The Incredibles |
| Chick Hicks | Cars |
| Bowler Hat Guy | Meet the Robinsons |
| Chef Skinner | Ratatouille |
| AUTO | WALL-E |
| Charles F. Muntz | Up |
| Lotso | Toy Story 3 |
| Mother Gothel Stabbington Brothers | Tangled |
| Miles Axlerod Professor Z | Cars 2 |
| Mor'du | Brave |
| King Candy | Wreck-It Ralph |
| Ripslinger | Planes |
| Prince Hans Duke of Weselton | Frozen |
| Cad Spinner | Planes: Fire & Rescue |
| Yokai | Big Hero 6 |
| Thunderclap | The Good Dinosaur |
| Dawn Bellwether | Zootopia |
| Tamatoa Kakamora | Moana |
| Ernesto de la Cruz | Coco |
| Evelyn Deavor | Incredibles 2 |
| Dragon | Toy Story 4 |
| King Magnifico | Wish |

== Merchandising ==
In August 2018, a strategy game titled Disney Villainous was designed by Prospero Hall, published by Ravensburger and released exclusively to Target stores. The game has players compete as Disney Villains attempting to accomplish their goals from the film, while simultaneously trying to slow down their opponents. As of March 2021, four standalone expansions have released, with each adding three different playable villains.

Villain merchandise was available at the former Villains in Vogue store in Sunset Blvd, at Disney's Hollywood Studios. This first store was so successful that the Disneyland Villain Shop was opened afterwards in 1991.

USAopoly has released a number of products featuring Disney villains. Among them is a Monopoly-based board game called My Disney Villains Monopoly; a checkers game; and a collector's card game set.

An online Disney trivia game called Who Wants to be a Villionaire, released in October 2001, is loosely based on Who Wants to Be a Millionaire? and features several villains as hosts, asking questions about the film in which they are featured. The "Phone-a-Friend" feature is renamed "Phone-a-Fiend" and will connect the player to Cruella de Vil.

There is a sub-franchise derived from Disney villains entitled Disney's Divas of Darkness. The line-up includes Maleficent, the Evil Queen, Cruella de Vil, Ursula, and the Queen of Hearts.

The Villains Designer Collection re-imagines the stylish wickedness of Disney villains. This line of merchandise includes Maleficent, Cruella de Vil, the Evil Queen, the Queen of Hearts, Ursula and Mother Gothel.

The Vinylmation collection also includes a Villains series.

In October 2026, McDonald's released for limited time due to Halloween buckets under the name "Boo Buckets" themed after several Disney Villains, focused on Maleficent, Cruella, Ursula, Jafar, and Scar.

== Theme parks and live events ==
Several characters from the Disney villains make meet-and-greet appearances at various Disney Parks locations. Previous parades such as Disney's Hollywood Studios' Disney Stars and Motor Cars Parade, SpectroMagic and Disney's Once Upon a Dream Parade featured a float dedicated to villains, and Parade of Dreams (an Ursula float).

A 1999 exhibit at the Cartoon Art Museum entitled "The Disney Villains" included displays featuring Disney's official villains, along with other villainous characters such as the Hunter from Bambi, and Br'er Fox & Br'er Bear from Song of the South.

=== Fantasmic! ===
Disney villains play a vital role in the nighttime show Fantasmic!, performed at the Disneyland and Disney's Hollywood Studios theme parks. In the shows, the Evil Queen decides it is time to finish off Mickey Mouse once and for all, and invokes other villains to help her.

=== Mickey's Not-So-Scary Halloween Party ===
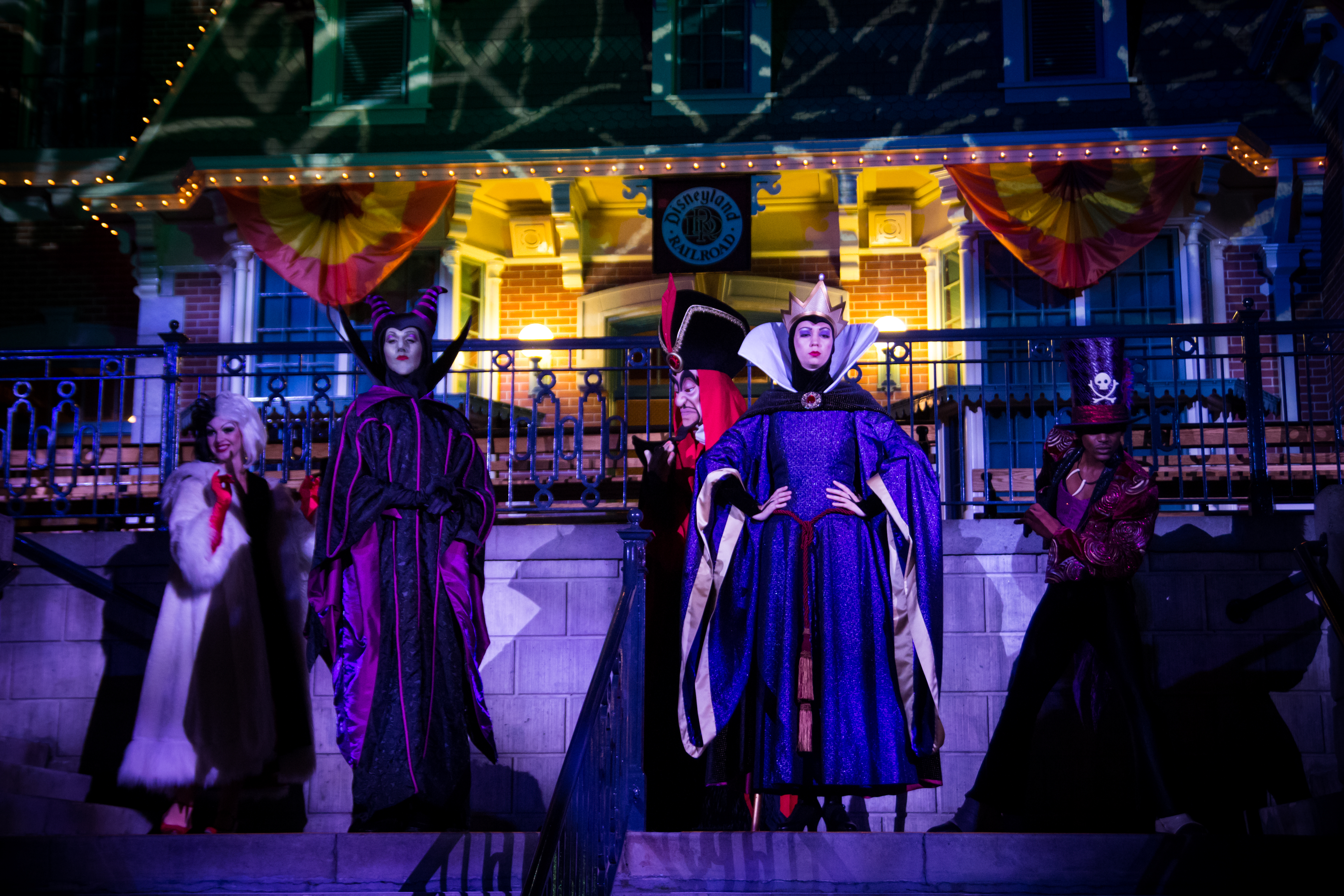
Cruella de Vil, Maleficent, Jafar, the Evil Queen and Dr. Facilier during Mickey's Not-So-Scary Halloween Party.

Disney villains appear in Mickey's Not-So-Scary Halloween Party, a Halloween-themed event held annually during the months of September and October at the Magic Kingdom theme park at Walt Disney World and at Disneyland Paris. A stage show and meet-and-greet with the villains led by Dr. Facilier (and prior to 2011 by Maleficent) titled "The Disney Villains Mix and Mingle" is held on the Cinderella Castle Forecourt Stage. Among those to visit are the Queen of Hearts, Captain Hook, and the Evil Queen among others. During the fireworks show HalloWishes some villains arrive to the celebration, starting with Ursula "plopping in" on the party and adding her own musical mix to the festivities. Jafar and Oogie Boogie soon follow, and arriving last is Maleficent showing the audience how Halloween should really be celebrated.

=== Dream Along with Mickey ===
In the Dream Along with Mickey stage show at Walt Disney World's Magic Kingdom, the Disney villains appear onstage to threaten Mickey Mouse, Minnie Mouse, Donald Duck and Goofy. Maleficent states that since people no longer believe in dreams, it is the perfect time for her to return to power and make the Magic Kingdom "The Place Where Nightmares Come True"—a play on the Disney Experiences slogan of "The Place Where Dreams Come True". She is also accompanied by Captain Hook.

=== Villains Tonight ===
The Disney villains star as the main characters in the Disney Cruise lines' variety show, Villains Tonight. This musical stage production features Hades on a quest to get more evil in the Underworld by summoning up Disney's most powerful villains so he can keep his job. This show features Maleficent, Jafar, the Evil Queen, Cruella de Vil, Captain Hook, Scar, Yzma, Ursula, and Chernabog in a variety of comical situations while performing various musical numbers from their respective appearances. This show debuted on the Disney Magic cruise ship March 27, 2010, and the Disney Dream on January 26, 2012.

=== Villains Land ===
In August 2024, it was announced that a seventh themed land focused on the Disney Villains will be built at the Magic Kingdom, at Walt Disney World. In August 2026, it was revealed that the name of Villains-themed land is Villains Land and the land will feature a storyline and two attractions, such as Maleficent coaster and Magic Mirror dark ride.

=== Disney Villains: Unfairly Ever After ===
In September 2024, it was announced that Lightning McQueen's Racing Academy would be closed on October 7, 2024, to make way for the Disney Villains-themed stage show Disney Villains: Unfairly Ever After, which debuted on May 27, 2025 in Sunset Showcase Theater at Disney's Hollywood Studios.

=== Villains Pre-Parade ===
In November 2025, it was announced that Disney Villains parade would return from Mickey's Not-So-Scary Halloween Party as a new special daytime parade, Villains Pre-Parade, which would take place before the holiday parade on Mickey's Very Merry Christmas Party at Magic Kingdom.

== Video games ==
=== Disney's Villains' Revenge ===
Disney's Villains' Revenge is a 1999 video game which tells the story of how the Evil Queen, Captain Hook, Queen of Hearts, and the Ringmaster change the story from their original tales to the way they wanted the story to end, with no "Happily Ever After".

=== Kingdom Hearts series ===
In the Kingdom Hearts series of action role-playing games developed and published by Disney Interactive Studios and Square Enix, Disney villains play a major role as they seek to harness the power of darkness. The villains are antagonists in different worlds, such as the Villains group led by Maleficent, with Pete as her main henchman, Hades in Olympus, Jafar in Agrabah, Ursula in Atlantica, Oogie Boogie in Halloween Town, Captain Hook in Neverland, and Scar in the Pride Lands. Other villain in the group outside the official Disney Villains line-up is Captain Barbossa of Port Royal.

Other Disney Villains in the games are Queen of Hearts in Wonderland, Clayton in Deep Jungle, Chernabog in End of the World & Symphony of Sorcery, Shan Yu in the Land of Dragons, The Evil Queen in Dwarf Woodlands, Lady Tremaine, Anastasia and Drizella in Castle of Dreams, Captain Gantu in Deep Space, Claude Frollo in La Cité des Cloches, Gaston in Beast's Castle, King Candy in Candy Kingdom, Mother Gothel in Kingdom of Corona, Randall Boggs in Monstropolis and Hans in Arendelle.

Other villains from Disney productions outside the official line-up that also make appearances include Sabor in Deep Jungle, the Master Control Program & Sark in Space Paranoids, CLU & Rinzler in The Grid, the Beagle Boys in Country of the Musketeers, Julius in Traverse Town, and Davy Jones & Cutler Beckett in The Caribbean. Monstro, the whale from Pinocchio, is both a character and a location as well as a boss in Kingdom Hearts Birth by Sleep Final Mix.

=== Epic Mickey series ===
Epic Mickey introduces new villains to the world of Disney, most of which are from old-style Disney films and attractions. In the first game, Mickey unwittingly creates a monster called the Shadow Blot (not to be confused with the Phantom Blot). As Mickey tries to get rid of it, Yen Sid approaches and Mickey is forced to flee, leaving some of the Blot undestroyed. Years later, the Blot has Mickey kidnapped so that his heart can be used to escape Wasteland. With Oswald's help, Mickey returns home as the Blot is defeated. The game also features an animatronic version of Captain Hook from Peter Pan as a boss.

In the second game, The Mad Doctor tries to rule in the Shadow Blot's stead. In the first game, the Mad Doctor supplied robots for the Blot. If the player choose the Hero path, The Mad Doctor's toon form is restored. If the player chooses the Scrapper path, The Mad Doctor is left in the final battle room to rot. Lastly, at the end of the second game, several versions of Pete look like they are going to take over the Wasteland themselves.

=== Disney Twisted-Wonderland ===
The mobile game Disney Twisted-Wonderland is focused in the Night Raven College, a college whose students live in seven different dormitories based on different Disney villains who are known as "The Great Seven": Heartslabyul, based on the Queen of Hearts; Savanaclaw, based on Scar; Octavinelle, based on Ursula; Scarabia, based on Jafar; Pomefiore, based on the Evil Queen; Ignihyde, based on Hades; and Diasomnia, based on Maleficent.

Additionally, several of the college staff are inspired by some villains, including the alchemy teacher Divus Crewel inspired by Cruella De Vil, the history teacher Mozus Trein inspired by Lady Tremaine, the gym teacher Ashton Vargas inspired by Gaston, and the school store proprietor Sam inspired by Dr. Facilier.

=== Disney Villains Cursed Café ===
In March 27, 2025 was released Disney Villains Cursed Café, a simulation video game where the player must prepare their orders for the Disney Villains in a coffeehouse frequented by them, with the villains appearing with designs adapted to the game, dressed in modern clothing.

=== Other games ===
Several Disney Villains are present as playable characters in the video game Disney Magic Kingdoms, acting as antagonists in new storylines placed after the events of their respective films. Maleficent acts as the main antagonist of the game, being responsible for the curses in the titular Kingdom, while Pete, Zurg, Mother Gothel, and Shere Khan appear as enemy bosses during the progression of the game's main storyline.

Alternate versions of the Evil Queen, Captain Hook, Maleficent, Cruella De Vil, Ursula, Gaston, Oogie Boogie, Scar, Zurg and Hades appear as playable characters in the video game Disney Mirrorverse.

Several Disney Villains appear in Disney Dreamlight Valley as villagers of the titular valley, with Ursula, Scar and Mother Gothel appearing during the progress of the main game, while Oogie Boogie can be welcomed for a limited time during Halloween events. Some of them act as main antagonists in the expansions of the game, as is the case of Jafar in the "A Rift in Time" DLC, Maleficent and Hades in "The Storybooke Vale" DLC, and Cruella in the "Wishblossom Ranch" DLC. Gaston also appears in "A Rift in Time", although in his case he finds himself in the position of acting as an ally to the player.

== Other media ==
=== Television ===
Characters from the franchise have been featured in television specials. The first, Our Unsung Villains, was aired in 1956 as part of Walt Disney Presents. In the special, Walt Disney himself hands hosting duties over to the Magic Mirror, who hosts a show devoted to Disney villains such as the Big Bad Wolf, the Evil Queen and Captain Hook, and Br'er Fox and Br'er Bear.

In 1977, there was an update to this show entitled Disney's Greatest Villains, that featured the Evil Queen and Captain Hook again, along with other characters from the franchise. Segments from this special were featured in A Disney Halloween.

A handful of alternate versions of Disney Villains appear in the ABC fantasy drama television series Once Upon a Time. A notable case of their appearances is in the fourth season, where Maleficent, Ursula and Cruella De Vil form a group known as the Queens of Darkness.

Gaston, Iago and Maleficent (in her dragon form) appear as antagonists in the Lego special for Disney+ Lego Disney Princess: The Castle Quest (2023). Gaston returns in the sequel Lego Disney Princess: Villains Unite (2025), where he is now allied with Ursula, Jafar, the Evil Queen, and Sir Hiss, and also tries to ally with Chernabog, but without success. In the third special, Lego Disney Princess: Magical Mayhem (2026), Cheshire Cat unleashes chaos in the princesses' castle by attracting various animals, among them Kaa, who tries to hypnotize Moana in order to devour her.

==== Descendants ====
The Disney Villains are a main focus in the Descendants franchise.

In the Disney Channel Original Movie Descendants appear Maleficent, the Evil Queen, Jafar and Cruella de Vil, along with their children, Mal, Evie, Jay and Carlos, respectively. They live on The Isle of the Lost, an island where all of Disney's villains and their various sidekicks have been imprisoned, along with all the other villains and their children. Mal, Evie, Jay, and Carlos were chosen by Prince Ben (son of King Beast and Queen Belle) to live in The United States of Auradon.

In the animated series Descendants: Wicked World, appear Freddie, Dr. Facilier's daughter, CJ, Captain Hook's daughter, and Zevon, Yzma's son.

In the sequel, Descendants 2, Uma, Harry and Gil, children of Ursula, Captain Hook and Gaston, appear as the main antagonists. Dizzy, Drizella's daughter, also appears as a more friendly character. Maleficent appears in a lizard form, having that appearance after the events in the previous film, while Ursula yells at her daughter from the kitchen in her restaurant, only one of her tentacles visible, and Lady Tremaine is simply heard yelling at her granddaughter from upstairs in her hairdresser.

In the third film, Descendants 3, appear Hades, Dr. Facilier, Lady Tremaine, and Mr. Smee. Celia, Dr. Facilier's daughter, and Squeaky and Squirmy, Mr. Smee's twin sons, are also introduced.

The fourth film, Descendants: The Rise of Red, feature Queen of Hearts, and teen versions of her, Maleficent, Hades, and Captain Hook. The film also introduce Red, Queen of Hearts' daughter.

The upcoming fifth film, Descendants: Wicked Wonderland, will introduce Queen of Hearts' other daughter, Pink, Captain Hook's daughter, Hazel, and Dr. Facilier's son, Felix.

=== Direct-to-video films ===
==== Mickey's House of Villains ====
The Disney Villains star in Mickey's House of Villains, the 2002 film adaptation of the animated television series House of Mouse. Set during a Halloween party, Jafar tells Cruella De Vil, Ursula and Captain Hook his plan to take over the club at midnight. Led by Jafar, they take over the club through the musical number "It's Our House Now", and all the other villains in the House join in. In the process, the Card Soldiers traps all the heroes in the kitchen, throws Mickey and his friends out into the street, while the House's name changes to the "House of Villains". Mickey, Donald and Goofy in turn try to return things to normal, but Chernabog keeps throwing them out. Minnie also tries to demand that they leave the club, but is expelled by Captain Hook. Afterwards, Mickey dresses in his famous sorcerer outfit from Fantasia and challenges Jafar to a magical duel using fireballs. Mickey's sorcerer hat is bounced off and there is very little time to put it back on, but then Aladdin saves the day by escaping the kitchen to the backstage room on the magic carpet and giving Daisy who gives Mickey the lamp to trap Jafar. Mickey sucks Jafar into the lamp, while the rest of the villains flee, restoring the House to normal.

==== Once Upon a Halloween ====
In the film Once Upon a Halloween, on the night before Halloween, the Evil Queen plans to conquer Halloween, and asks her cauldron to show the viewer several villains to which one of them helps her in her plan. Among them, Peg Leg Pete, Ursula, Captain Hook, Yzma, Professor Ratigan, Alameda Slim, Judge Claude Frollo, and Horned King are the ones with a main focus.

=== Short films ===
In The Simpsons short Welcome to the Club (2022), several Disney Villains, among them Evil Queen (in her witch form), Queen of Hearts, Captain Hook, Maleficent, Cruella de Vil, Ursula, Kaa, Jafar, Scar, and Hades, try to show Lisa Simpson through a musical number how much fun being a villain can be. In the 2024 short The Most Wonderful Time of the Year (2024), the Disney Villains and Sideshow Bob, along with some other villains from franchises from other Disney brands, sing a carol for Halloween.

Several Disney Villains from Walt Disney Animation Studios productions was appeared in the short film Once Upon a Studio (2023) in celebration of Disney's 100th anniversary.

=== Novels ===
==== Kingdom Keepers series ====
In the Kingdom Keepers novel series, Disney villains form a group known as the "Overtakers".

=== Comic books ===
==== Disney Villains graphic novels ====
A series of graphic novels focused on the Disney Villains started to be released in 2023, with issues focused on Scar, Maleficent, and Hades. In 2024 was released an issue focused on Cruella De Vil. In 2026, were released issues focused on Ursula and Gaston.

=== Board games ===
==== Disney Villainous ====
The Villainous board game franchise, published by Ravensburger, puts players in the roles of Disney villains. It has been praised by critics and fans for its lush artwork and easy-to-learn yet compelling strategy elements. The game is unique in that it features an asymmetrical structure, with players working to complete their own unique goals. The core game, The Worst Takes It All, has been followed up with eight expansions (to date): Wicked to the Core, Evil Comes Prepared, Perfectly Wretched, Despicable Plots, Treacherous Tides, Filled with Fright, Sugar and Spite, and Bigger and Badder. With a ninth expansion, Come, We Fly!, scheduled to be released at the end of 2026.

== Legacy ==
Disney villains proved their mark in cinematic history when the American Film Institute named the Evil Queen from Snow White and the Seven Dwarfs as the 10th-greatest movie villain of all time. Other Disney Villains on AFI's list were the Man from Bambi as the 20th and Cruella de Vil from 101 Dalmatians as the 39th. AFI did not rely on Disney's classification of who qualified as a villain, but used this definition instead:

a "villain" was defined as a character(s) whose wickedness of mind, selfishness of character and will to power are sometimes masked by beauty and nobility, while others may rage unmasked. They can be horribly evil or grandiosely funny, but are ultimately tragic.

Other Disney villains who got a nomination here were Maleficent from Sleeping Beauty, Ursula from The Little Mermaid, Lady Tremaine from Cinderella, and Stromboli from Pinocchio.

== See also ==
- Disney Consumer Products
- Disney Princess
- Disney Fairies
