= A Disney Halloween =

A Disney Halloween may refer to:

- "A Disney Halloween" (Walt Disney)
- A Disney Halloween (1983 special)
