= Susanne Blakeslee =

American actress

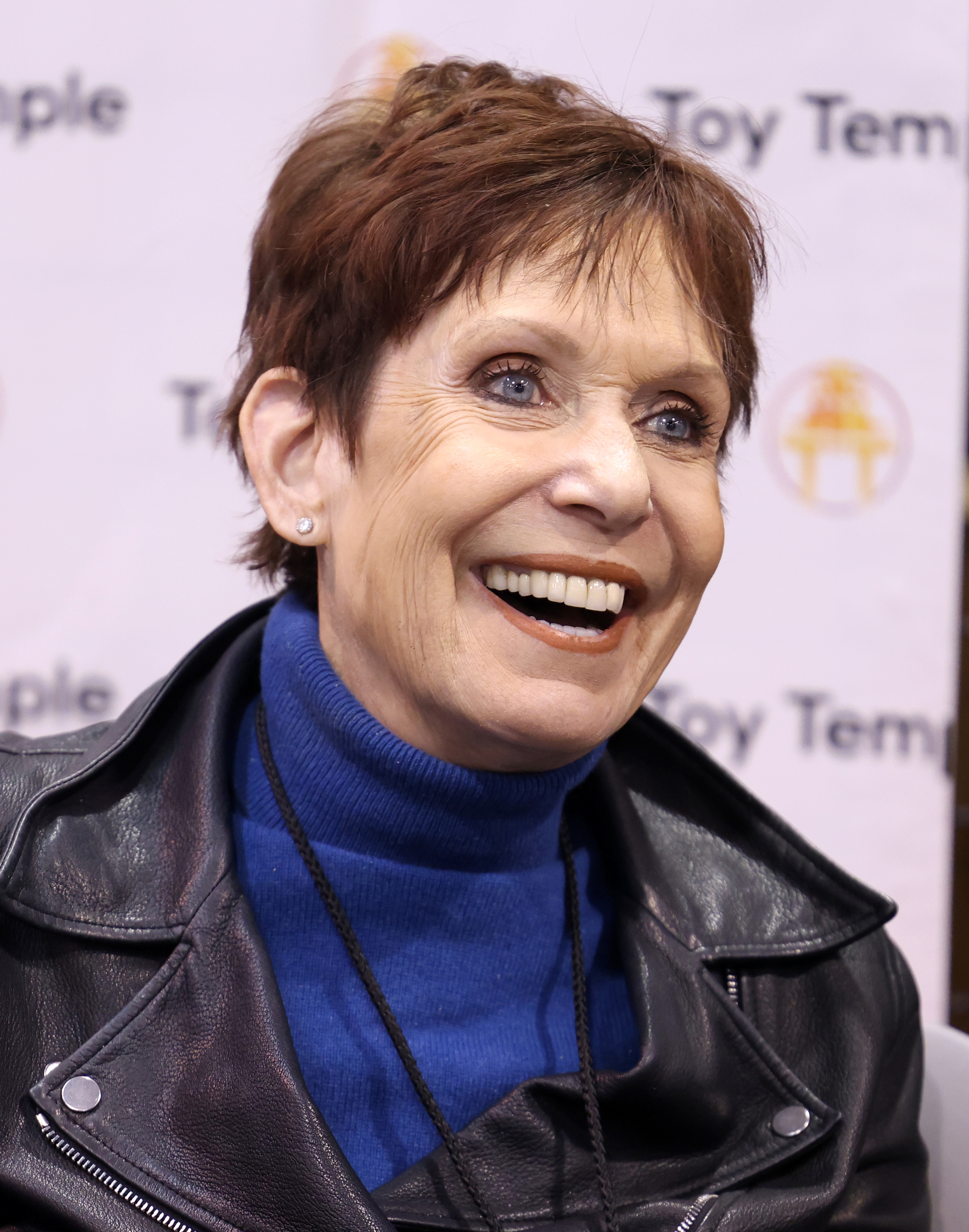
- Blakeslee in 2025
- Other names: Susan Blakeslee; Suzanne Blakeslee; Suzanne Blakesley
- Occupation: Actress
- Years active: 1985–present
- Awards: Ovation Award

Susanne Blakeslee is an American voice actress. Her notable roles include the voices of Wanda, Anti-Wanda, and Mrs. Turner on The Fairly OddParents; and as the voices of Cruella De Vil, Evil Queen, Lady Tremaine, Maleficent and Madame Leota for various Disney media.

In 2012, Blakeslee won an Ovation Award for Lead Actress in a Musical for Forbidden Broadway Greatest Hits, Volume 2.

== Career ==
=== Stage ===
Blakeslee performed on the stage set of Forbidden Broadway from 1990 to 1994 and worked as the show's choreographer in 1994. Blakeslee won the Lead Actress in a Musical Ovation Award in 2012 for her performance in Forbidden Broadway Greatest Hits, Volume 2.

=== Voice acting ===
Blakeslee is noted for voicing Wanda, Anti-Wanda, and Mrs. Turner, for The Fairly OddParents franchise from 2001 to 2017, including 172 episodes of the television series, six specials and seven TV movies, as well as voicing these characters in the related Jimmy Timmy Power Hour trilogy. Blakeslee reprised the role of Wanda in the 2022 live-action/animated series The Fairly OddParents: Fairly Odder and in the 2024 animated series The Fairly OddParents: A New Wish.

Blakeslee has done extensive voice work for Disney, including animated features and theme park attractions at the Disneyland Resort, Walt Disney World and Tokyo Disney Resort since 2001.

Blakeslee has voiced-sound-alikes and original characters in Disney media. Her roles include the following:

- Cruella de Vil in 101 Dalmatians II: Patch's London Adventure (replacing Betty Lou Gerson after her death).
- Madame Leota in the Haunted Mansion Holiday attractions in Disneyland and Walt Disney World (replacing Eleanor Audley after her death).
- The Evil Queen in House of Mouse and Once Upon a Halloween.
- Kala in The Legend of Tarzan (replacing Glenn Close).
- Lady Tremaine in Cinderella II: Dreams Come True and Cinderella III: A Twist in Time (replacing Audley after her death).
- Maleficent in Kingdom Hearts (replacing Audley after her death).
- Delores Derceto and Ms. Birch in American Dragon: Jake Long.
- Flora in the Nightfall Glow attraction in Tokyo Disneyland.
- The Witch in the video game Brave.
- Old Lady Crowley in Rapunzel's Tangled Adventure (replacing Pat Carroll).
- Mrs. Quackfaster in the 2017 reboot series DuckTales.

== Filmography ==
=== Live-action roles ===
Year	Title	Role	Notes	Source
1995	Saved by the Bell: The New Class	Woman	Episode: "No Smoking"	
1996	The Home Court	Tricia	Episode: "Touched by an Anger"	
1997	Caroline in the City	Singing Woman	Episode: "Caroline and the Long Shot"	
2005	Ned's Declassified School Survival Guide	Wanda (voice)	Episode: "Daydreaming"	
2022	The Fairly OddParents: Fairly Odder	Wanda (voice)	Main role	

=== Anime roles ===
- Vampire Princess Miyu - Machiko (ep. 8), Ja-Ka (ep. 10)

=== Animated roles ===
Year	Title	Role	Notes	Source
1997–2001	The Angry Beavers	Daggett Beaver (singing), Hen, Female Passenger	3 episodes	
1998	Cow and Chicken	Loulabelle, Gunslinger, Cat, Polar Bear	3 episodes	
1998	Superman: The Animated Series	Teacher	Episode: "Little Big Head Man"	
1998–2000	Oh Yeah! Cartoons	Wanda, various voices	6 episodes	
2001	The Legend of Tarzan	Kala	7 episodes	
2001–2003	House of Mouse	Cruella de Vil, The Evil Queen	8 episodes	
2001–2017	The Fairly OddParents	Wanda, Mrs. Turner, various voices	Main role	
2004	The Powerpuff Girls	Sandra Practice, Police Operator, Woman	Episode: "Girls Gone Mild"	
2004	What's New, Scooby-Doo?	Penelope Bailey	Episode: "Recipe for Disaster"	
2004	Evil Con Carne	Hector's Mother	Episode: "The Mother of All Evils"	
2005	The Grim Adventures of Billy & Mandy	Crabina	Episode: "My Fair Mandy"	
2005	Danny Phantom	Dora Mattingly	Episode: "Beauty Marked"	
2005–2007	American Dragon: Jake Long	Dolores Dercerto	5 episodes	
2006	Brandy & Mr. Whiskers	Rodent in Stands	Episode: "Go! Fight! Win!"	
2007	The Replacements	Mistress Serena	Episode: "Fiddlin' Around"	
2008–2010	The Secret Saturdays	Miranda Grey, Rani Nagi	10 episodes	
2009	Chowder	Turtle Lady, Witch	Episode: "The Big Hat Biddies"	
2010	The Penguins of Madagascar	Teacher	Episode: "Field Tripped"	
2010–2011	Kick Buttowski: Suburban Daredevil	Librarian	2 episodes	
2011–2013	Green Lantern: The Animated Series	Sayd	6 episodes	
2011–2014	Winx Club	Assistant Principal Griselda, Sirenix Guardian, various voices	English dub	
2013–2014	Kung Fu Panda: Legends of Awesomeness	Mei Ling	2 episodes	
2015	Be Cool, Scooby-Doo!	Charlene Tandywine, Lady Annabelle	Episode: "Poodle Justice"	
2016	All Hail King Julien	Butterfly Queen	Episode: "The Butterfly War"	
2016–2022	The Loud House	Mrs. Johnson, Mrs. Jelinsky, Photographer	Recurring role	
2017	Bunsen Is a Beast	Wanda, Mrs. Turner	Episode: "Beast of Friends"	
2017	Billy Dilley's Super-Duper Subterranean Summer	Hag Witch	3 episodes	
2017–2019	DuckTales	Mrs. Quackfaster, various voices	6 episodes	
2019–2020	Rapunzel's Tangled Adventure	Old Lady Crowley	Replacing Pat Carroll	
2019–2022	Amphibia	Valeriana	3 episodes	
2020	Elena of Avalor	Ship Chandler	Episode: "Giant Steps"	
2020	It's Pony	Nana B	Episode: "Bramley Holiday"	
2021–2022	DreamWorks Dragons: Rescue Riders	Chief Ingrid	2 episodes	
2024	The Fairly OddParents: A New Wish	Wanda, Anti-Wanda	Main role	

=== Film ===
Year	Title	Role	Notes	Source
2002	Cinderella II: Dreams Come True	Lady Tremaine		
2002	Mickey's House of Villains	Cruella de Vil		
2003	101 Dalmatians II: Patch's London Adventure	Cruella de Vil		
2004–2006	The Jimmy Timmy Power Hour series	Wanda, Mrs. Turner, Anti-Wanda, Anti Fairy Walla	Television films	
2005	Once Upon a Halloween	Evil Queen		
2006	Tales from Earthsea	Queen	English dub	
2007	Cinderella III: A Twist in Time	Lady Tremaine		
2007	Shrek the Third	Evil Queen		
2007	Disney Princess Enchanted Tales: Follow Your Dreams	Narrator		
2011	A Fairly Odd Movie: Grow Up, Timmy Turner!	Wanda	Television film	
2012	A Fairly Odd Christmas	Wanda	Television film	
2014	Scooby-Doo! Frankencreepy	Townswoman	Direct-to-video	
2016	My Life as a Courgette	Ms. Paterson, Zucchini's Mother		
2025	The Colors Within	Sister Juri		

=== Video games ===
Year	Title	Role	Notes
1999	Lands of Lore III	Jaden, Rosalinda	
1999	Tarzan	Kala	
1999	Sword of the Berserk: Guts' Rage	Dunteth's Wife	
2000	Nox	Women	
2000	Disney's 102 Dalmatians: Puppies to the Rescue	Cruella de Vil	
2001	Tarzan: Untamed	Kala	
2002	Kingdom Hearts	Maleficent	
2002	Summoner 2	Bashra, Perduellion, Nepanthies	
2003	Treasure Planet: Battle at Procyon	Admiral Amelia	
2003	Arc the Lad: Twilight of the Spirits	Selkis	
2003	Nickelodeon Toon Twister 3-D	Wanda	
2003	Disney's Extreme Skate Adventure	Kala	
2003	The Fairly OddParents: Breakin' Da Rules	Wanda, Mrs. Turner	
2004	Nicktoons Movin'	Wanda	
2004	The Fairly OddParents: Shadow Showdown	Wanda	
2004	The Nightmare Before Christmas: Oogie's Revenge	Helgamine	
2004	EverQuest II	Various enemies	
2004	Spyro: A Hero's Tail	Ineptune	
2005	God of War	Oracle of Athens, Village Oracle	
2005	Scooby-Doo! Unmasked	Dame Nella Vivante	
2005	Evil Dead: Regeneration	Deadites	
2005	Nicktoons Unite!	Wanda, Lab Computer	
2006	Kingdom Hearts II	Maleficent	
2006	Scooby-Doo! Who's Watching Who?	Henrietta Bascombe, Scare Pair	
2006	Nicktoons: Battle for Volcano Island	Wanda	
2007	Shrek the Third	Evil Queen, Dronkies, Witch	
2007	BioShock	Julie Langford, Lady Smith Splicers	
2007	Nicktoons: Attack of the Toybots	Wanda	
2007	The Golden Compass	Mrs. Lonsdale	
2008	Kung Fu Panda	Wu Sister, Queen Crocodile	
2008	Kung Fu Panda: Legendary Warriors	Wu Sister	
2009	Coraline	Miriam Forcible	
2010	BioShock 2	Lady Smith Splicers	
2010	God of War III	Gaia	
2010	Kingdom Hearts Birth by Sleep	Lady Tremaine, Maleficent, Evil Queen	
2010	Epic Mickey	Madame Leota	
2010	Spider-Man: Shattered Dimensions	Madame Web	
2011	Kingdom Hearts Re:coded	Maleficent	
2011	Shadows of the Damned	Grim Shisatsu	
2011	Kinect: Disneyland Adventures	Madame Leota	
2012	Diablo III	Maghda	
2012	Brave	Witch	
2012	Kingdom Hearts 3D: Dream Drop Distance	Maleficent	
2013	God of War: Ascension	Village Oracle	
2013	Kingdom Hearts HD 1.5 Remix	Maleficent	
2014	Diablo III: Reaper of Souls	Maghda	
2014	Disney Infinity 2.0	Witch	
2014	Kingdom Hearts HD 2.5 ReMIX	Maleficent	
2015	Disney Infinity 3.0	Maleficent	
2017	Kingdom Hearts HD 2.8 Final Chapter Prologue	Maleficent	
2019	Kingdom Hearts III	Maleficent	
2020	Kingdom Hearts: Melody of Memory	Maleficent	
2023	Harry Potter: Magic Awakened	Minerva McGonagall	
2023	Persona 5 Tactica	Jerri	
2024	Persona 3 Reload	Mitsuko Kitamura	
2024	Alone in the Dark	Magdalene Thompson	
2024	Disney Speedstorm	Maleficent, Cruella de Vil, Evil Queen	
2025	Disney Villains Cursed Café	Maleficent, Cruella de Vil, Evil Queen	
2025	Like a Dragon: Pirate Yakuza in Hawaii	Additional voices	
2025	Nicktoons & The Dice of Destiny	Wanda	
2025	Dune: Awakening	The Reverend Mother	

=== Theme parks ===
- Wishes - Evil Queen (voice)
- Fantasmic! - Cruella de Vil (voice)
- Halloween Screams - Maleficent (voice)
- HalloWishes - Maleficent (voice)
- Magic, Music and Mayhem - Flora (voice)
- Haunted Mansion Holiday - Madame Leota (voice)
- Jimmy Neutron's Nicktoon Blast - Wanda (voice)
- Nightfall Glow - Flora (voice, uncredited)
- Disney's Fantillusion! - Flora (voice, uncredited)
- Sorcerers of the Magic Kingdom - Cruella de Vil (voice), Flora (voice, uncredited), Maleficent (voice)

=== Stage shows ===
- Disney Live! Mickey's Magic Show - Evil Queen (voice)
- Disney on Ice: Disneyland Adventure - Maleficent (voice)
- Disney on Ice: Let's Celebrate - Cruella de Vil (voice), Evil Queen (voice), Maleficent (voice)
- Disney on Ice: Princess Classics - Lady Tremaine (voice)
- Dream Along With Mickey - Maleficent (voice)
- Hocus Pocus Villain Spelltacular - Maleficent (voice)
- The Disney Villains Mix and Mingle - Maleficent (voice)
- Three Classic Fairy Tales - Evil Queen (voice), Lady Tremaine (voice)

=== Stage appearances ===
- Forbidden Broadway 1990, Theatre East, New York City, 1990
- Forbidden Broadway 1991 ½, Theatre East, 1991–92
- Forbidden Christmas, Theatre East, 1991–92
- Forbidden Broadway featuring Forbidden Christmas, Theatre East, 1992
- Forbidden Broadway 1993, Theatre East, 1993
- Forbidden Broadway 1994, Theatre East, 1994
- On the Twentieth Century as Dr. Johnson, UCLA Freud Playhouse, Los Angeles, 2003
- What If?, Hudson Main Stage, Los Angeles, 2004

=== Stage work ===
- Choreographer, Forbidden Broadway 1994, Theatre East, New York City, 1994

=== Discography ===
- Disney Princess Cinderella Read-Along Storybook and CD (2009/Disney Book Group) - Lady Tremaine
- Disney Songs and Story: Cinderella (2009/Walt Disney Records) - Lady Tremaine

== Awards and nominations ==
Ovation Awards

- 2012: Won the award for Lead Actress in a Musical for her role as Woman 1 in the Musical Theatre West production of "Forbidden Broadway Greatest Hits, Volume 2"
