= A Disney Halloween (1983 TV film) =

1983 television special

- Narrated by: Hans Conried (Magic Mirror); Hal Douglas (Off-screen Narrator)

Production
- Running time: 90 minutes

Original release
- Network: Disney Channel
- Release: October 1, 1983

A Disney Halloween is a 90-minute Halloween-themed television special which originally aired as an exclusive on The Disney Channel on October 1, 1983.

== Summary ==
The special is hosted by an offscreen narrator (voiced by Hal Douglas) and the Magic Mirror (using re-edited vintage footage of the late Hans Conried) which incorporates segments from both "Disney's Halloween Treat" (1982) and "Disney's Greatest Villains" (1977) episodes featuring classic short cartoons and excerpts of various villains from Disney feature films. The opening and closing credits feature footage of the 1929 Silly Symphony short The Skeleton Dance, as did "Disney's Halloween Treat", but the coloring on the skeletons has been changed to green, orange, and dark green. The special was rebroadcast during October for the following years on The Disney Channel until the late 1990s.

=== Introduction ===
In later versions, Disney's then-chairman, Michael Eisner, introduces the special along with Mickey Mouse (Wayne Allwine) and Minnie Mouse (Russi Taylor) in their incarnation as costumed characters from the Disney theme parks. Mickey tells Eisner that Goofy is on his way and "has been working on his costume for a month". There is a knock on the door we see Goofy's "costume": Michael Eisner, overdubbed with Goofy's (Bill Farmer) voice.

This intro was also used to introduce The Adventures of Ichabod and Mr. Toad which resolves the confusion Michael Eisner posed when he refers to this special as "a Disney Halloween treat;" his referral was not meant to be a title for the program but rather a generic description for any Halloween program to follow.

=== Part I: Featured segments with the Narrator ===
- "Night on Bald Mountain" sequence – Fantasia (1940)
- "Madam Mim" – The Sword in the Stone (1963)
- The Old Mill – Silly Symphony (1937)
- Clip of Mickey's Parrot (1938)
- Donald Duck and the Gorilla (1944) – Donald Duck and his nephews Huey, Dewey and Louie
- "Heffalumps and Woozles" nightmare sequence – Winnie the Pooh and the Blustery Day (1968) from The Many Adventures of Winnie the Pooh (1977) (with song lyrics on-screen)
- "Pluto's Judgement" sequence featuring three Pluto cartoons assembled together:
  - Puss Cafe (1950)
  - Cat Nap Pluto (1948)
  - Pluto's Judgement Day (1935)
- "Of Cats and Men" (1968) (This was an educational short that used a portion of video from "The Great Cat Family" – Disneyland (1956) dubbed over with the special's narrator)
- "Si and Am" – Lady and the Tramp (1955) (with song lyrics on-screen)

=== Part II: Featured segments with the Magic Mirror ===
- Captain Hook – Peter Pan (1953)
- Edgar Balthazar – The Aristocats (1970)
- Willie the Giant – Mickey and the Beanstalk segment of Fun and Fancy Free (1947)
- Shere Khan and Kaa – The Jungle Book (1967)
- The Evil Queen – Snow White and the Seven Dwarfs (1937)
- Maleficent – Sleeping Beauty (1959)
- Lady Tremaine – Cinderella (1950)
- Cruella de Vil – One Hundred and One Dalmatians (1961)
- The Queen of Hearts – Alice in Wonderland (1951)
- Madame Medusa – The Rescuers (1977)

=== Part III: Featured segments with the Narrator ===
The following two cartoons were featured after the Magic Mirror's segment of the program:

- Lonesome Ghosts (1937) – Mickey Mouse, Donald Duck and Goofy
- Trick or Treat (1952) – Donald Duck, Huey, Dewey and Louie and Witch Hazel

== See also ==
- "Our Unsung Villains" (1956)
- "Halloween Hall o' Fame" (1977)
- "Disney's Greatest Villains" (1977)
- "A Disney Halloween" (1981)
- "Disney's Halloween Treat" (1982)
- Mickey's House of Villains (2002)
- Once Upon a Halloween (2005)
