= Mickey's Mechanical House =

- Mickey Mouse Works episode
- Episode no.: Season 1 Episode 9
- Narrated by: John Cleese
- Original air date: September 11, 1999

Episode chronology
← Previous "Donald On Ice"	Next → "Pluto Gets the Paper: Street Cleaner"

"Mickey's Mechanical House" is a cartoon made by Walt Disney Television Animation, originally released in 1999 as part of the 9th episode of Mickey Mouse Works. It is narrated by Monty Python member John Cleese. The cartoon was also included in the plot of the film Mickey's House of Villains (2002), and in the House of Mouse episode "House of Genius" (2003).

== Plot ==
This cartoon is narrated in rhyme. A very tired Mickey Mouse is trying to sleep but his house has several flaws that prevent him from doing so; the roof constantly creaks, wind blows around, the boiler turns on by itself, causing pipes to rattle and shutters constantly open and close. When he goes to the bathroom for a drink of water, the water comes out of the drain and squirts him in the face.

This is the final straw for him. He gets fed up with his house's flaws so he decides to move. He and Pluto walk past houses for sale and are drawn to one in particular. A salesman who is selling it reveals that it is electric. It includes a couch that folds into a wall, a robot chef and a vacuum machine. Mickey signs a contract and accepts the opportunity to live in the house.

With a few button presses, he receives a snacks, a recliner that has mechanical hands that massage him, surround sound and dimming lights. When he decides to take a bath before bedtime, the recliner takes him to the bathroom where he receives a car wash-like bath. After being tucked in, he realizes that he is unable to sleep because he is so amazed by his house's amenities.

He decides to stay up all night to play with the devices. However, when he attempts to leave his bedroom, the robot chef, refusing to let him stay up, grabs him and forces him back into bed. He escapes but the robot chef stops him again. After several more unsuccessful attempts, he escapes and declares war on the robot chef. He plans to use a bucket of water in the kitchen to short it out. When it goes in the kitchen, he pulls a rope, releasing the bucket which falls on it. The water destroys it but this causes the house's circuits to malfunction.

Food in the refrigerator splatters Mickey. The recliner drags him to the bathroom where he gets bathed against his will. When he flees, he comes across the vacuum machine which sucks everything around it. He tries to fight it but the recliner attacks from behind. The recliner squeezes him but he overcomes the squeezing. He throws the recliner at the remote that controls the house, destroying it.

While the house starts to collapse, Mickey escapes and gets Pluto. After they see the house collapse, they return to their old house. Mickey recognizes that it is not perfect but he decides that he and Pluto should stop on a whim.

== Cast ==
- Wayne Allwine as Mickey Mouse
- Bill Farmer as Pluto
- John Cleese as the Narrator
- Jeff Bennett as Salesman

== Reception ==
The episode is said to exemplify fiction that "animate(s) the sentient home through its collection of labor-saving, but ultimately" malfunctioning devices. The film is also described as follows: "It's a new short, well animated in the UPA style of the 1950s. Cleese does a wonderful job as the narrator, and brings the story to life with zest and his impeccable sense of wry irony in his voice."
