= Disney's Halloween Treat =

- Walt Disney episode
- Episode no.: Season 29; Episode 6
- Original air date: October 30, 1982
- Running time: 60 minutes

Guest appearance
- Hal Douglas (Jack-o'-lantern)

Episode chronology
← Previous "EPCOT Center: The Opening Celebration"	Next → "No Deposit, No Return"

"Disney's Halloween Treat" is a 1982 Halloween-themed episode of Walt Disney which originally aired October 30, 1982 on CBS.

== Plot ==
The episode is narrated by a jack-o'-lantern puppet (voiced by Hal Douglas) and features a compilation of Disney short cartoons involving spooky or supernatural themes as well as excerpted segments of various villains from Disney feature films. The opening and closing credits feature an orange colorized version of the 1929 Silly Symphony short The Skeleton Dance as well as its own title theme song, sung in the opening and closing credits. The lyrics were written by Galen R. Brandt with music by John Debney.

== Alternate title ==
This special was also released under an alternative title, "Scary Tales of Halloween", and was also available in both syndicated and network versions.

== Updated version ==
An updated version of this program, the Disney Channel exclusive, "A Disney Halloween" aired in 1983 which incorporated segments from both "Disney's Halloween Treat" and "Disney's Greatest Villains" (1977). "Disney's Halloween Treat" was rebroadcast throughout the 1980s up until the mid-1990s.

== Featured segments ==
- "Madam Mim" – The Sword in the Stone (1963)
- "Night on Bald Mountain" sequence – Fantasia (1940)
- Clip of Pluto's Sweater (1949)
- Clip of Mickey's Parrot (1938)
- Donald Duck and the Gorilla (1944) – Donald Duck and his nephews Huey, Dewey and Louie
- "Pluto's Judgement" sequence featuring three Pluto cartoons assembled together:
  - Puss Cafe (1950)
  - Cat Nap Pluto (1948)
  - Pluto's Judgement Day (1935)
- "Captain Hook" – Peter Pan (1953)
- "Cruella de Vil" – One Hundred and One Dalmatians (1961)
- "The Evil Queen" – Snow White and the Seven Dwarfs (1937)
- "Si and Am" – Lady and the Tramp (1955) (with song lyrics on-screen)
- "Ichabod Crane and Headless Horseman" – The Adventures of Ichabod and Mr. Toad (1949)

== Home video release ==
"Disney's Halloween Treat" was released on VHS in 1984. As of today, it has not yet been released on DVD, Blu-ray or any streaming platform.

== Credits ==
- This program is the results of the talents of many creative people at the Walt Disney Studios.
- The contribution of the ANIMATION STAFF is particularly appreciated.

== Trivia ==
- The announcer during the pre-show for the broadcast referred to the special as both "A Spooky Halloween Treat" and "A Halloween Treat" but never by its title.
- The VHS cut the original broadcast opening, from the pan/zoom into Sleeping Beauty's castle to the ghost playing the organ in the Haunted Mansion, which subsequently also cut out the pumpkin narrator's "And" before "Now it's time for Disney's Halloween Treat." This portion of the opening is retained in A Disney Halloween" (1983).
- The pumpkin narrator is actually uncredited in the special and VHS.

== See also ==
- "Our Unsung Villains" (1956)
- "Disney's Greatest Villains" (1977)
- "Halloween Hall o' Fame" (1977)
- "A Disney Halloween" (1981)
- "A Disney Halloween" (1983)
- Mickey's House of Villains (2002)
- Once Upon a Halloween (2005)
