= Joseph Rosenberg =

Banker

- Born: Joseph Henry Rosenberg; 28 August 1881; Hungary
- Died: 29 June 1971 (age 89); Los Angeles
- Education: Yale University
- Occupation: Banker
- Known for: movie lending
- Parent(s): Henry Rosenberg, Lottie Rosenberg
- Family: never married

Joseph H. Rosenberg (1881–1971) was a bank executive credited with financing most of the Hollywood movie industry in its early days. Rosenberg, who served as an executive of Bank of America and Lehman Brothers, had a 61-year career in banking.

== Early years ==
Joseph Rosenberg was born in Hungary, immigrated to the US (Cleveland, Ohio), age six. After studying engineering at Case School of Applied Science and graduating from Yale University (class of 1903), he was a surveyor of an ill-fated Mexican railroad construction venture, attempted a mining career in Arizona, and rode a horse 275 miles from Goldfield, Nevada, to Chloride, Arizona, in search of a job. This lone open-country ride, in which Indians ferried him across the Colorado River while the horse swam at the end of a rope, took two weeks. The trip was prolonged for two days because he was asked to stay by a family he met in his travels, who had not seen anyone for three months. After seven unsuccessful years of engineering, Rosenberg was hired by the Arizona Central Bank (Kingman, Arizona with a branch in Chloride) in 1910. In 1926 he joined Los Angeles Merchants National Bank. When Merchants was absorbed by Bank of America, Rosenberg became a vice president. With most banks skeptical about the movie industry as it tried to become big business, Bank of America financed many studio loans. The job of evaluating producers and movies fell to Rosenberg, who had total responsibility for approving movie lending.

== Walt Disney ==
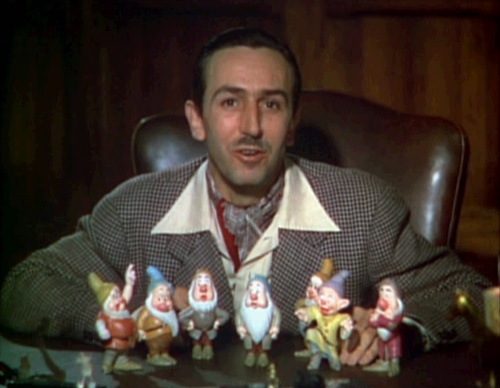
Walt Disney introduces each of the Seven Dwarfs in a scene from the original 1937 Snow White and the Seven Dwarfs theatrical trailer.

Midway through making Snow White and the Seven Dwarfs, Walt Disney, after spending $1.25 million, needed another $250,000 to complete the film. Disney ran a rough cut for Rosenberg, who sat impassively during the showing. Then Rosenberg turned to the worried Disney and said, “Walt, that thing is going to make a hatful of money” and approved the loan. In April 1941, work on The Adventures of Ichabod and Mr. Toad had begun as animators and writers had come off from Bambi, which was nearly complete. When the Disney animators' strike was finished in October 1941, Rosenberg issued an ultimatum in which he would permit an absolute loan limit of $3.5 million, and in return, he ordered the studio to restrict itself to producing animation shorts and to finish features already in production—Dumbo, Bambi, and The Adventures of Ichabod and Mr. Toad—but no other feature film would begin work until they had been released and earned back their costs. In response, the studio's feature film production, including early versions of Alice in Wonderland and Lady and the Tramp, were heavily scaled back while The Adventures of Ichabod and Mr. Toad was kept in production as animation work had already begun. However, after reviewing the animation footage, Disney decided to shelve the project deciding that "the quality was too far below the standard necessary to be successful on the market."

Similarly, Rosenberg would later urge Walter Lantz, creator of Woody Woodpecker, to temporarily close his studio in 1949 due to Lantz's financial struggles with distributor United Artists. Once Lantz's loans were reduced, his studio would reopen in 1950.

== Trial of Joseph Schenck ==
On 18 March 1941, Rosenberg described in court a $100,000 loan made to Joseph M. Schenck, which Schenck repaid within four days. Rosenberg, testifying in the trial of the film executive on income tax evasion charges, said that on June 22, 1937, four days after the loan was made, Schenck telephoned him just before the bank closed for the day and said he was coming over. Rosenberg said that Schenck appeared carrying a brown paper grocer's bag. In the bag was $100,000 in fifty and hundred dollar bills. The government described the $100,000 as a "mystery" sum and indicated testimony could be offered to show that through a series of business deals Schenck came out $100,000 ahead and allegedly failed to declare the $100,000 in his income tax return. Schenck was convicted of tax evasion, went to prison, and subsequently received a presidential pardon from Harry S. Truman.

== Later years ==
At the age of 65 in 1946, the bank forced Rosenberg to retire, and he started a second career. He joined Lehman Brothers as a senior partner and opened their Los Angeles office a month after leaving Bank of America. Even at the age of 89 he was still working when he became ill. He died at Good Samaritan Hospital (Los Angeles) and is interred in Home of Peace Cemetery (East Los Angeles). In later years he often criticized companies for forcing managers to retire at 65. He called it a waste of the country's most productive resource. Rosenberg outlived his three brothers, who managed Milwaukee woolen mills in which Rosenberg held an interest. Three nieces who lived in Milwaukee survived him.

== Philanthropy ==
In 1968, the Hebrew Union College's new California school, adjacent to University of Southern California at 32nd and Hoover Streets, included the Joseph H. Rosenberg Center of the American Jewish Archives. The Center collected documents pertaining to the origins and development of Western Jewry that made history. Dr. Nelson Glueck, college president, said that the center was being named for its donor, who at 86 was still a general partner in the Los Angeles office of Lehman Brothers. Rosenberg had long been active on behalf of the California school and was chairman of its budget and finance committee. Dr. Glueck added that the Rosenberg Center would be the West Coast depository of copies of documents, numbering about three million pages, in the American Jewish Archives on the Cincinnati campus of the 93-year-old rabbinical seminary. The Archives, said Dr. Glueck, were a Jewish counterpart of the National Archives in Washington, D.C., and devoted to the systematic collection and preservation of material shedding light on the Jewish experience in the Western Hemisphere. The new California school, for which land had recently been purchased, was to replace inadequate facilities at 8745 Appian Way in the Hollywood Hills, part of the four-campus college, which also had schools in New York and Jerusalem to train rabbis, cantors and Jewish educators.

== Bibliography ==
- Barrier, Michael (1999). Hollywood Cartoons: American Animation in Its Golden Age. Oxford University Press. ISBN 978-0-19-802079-0.
- Gabler, Neal (2006). Walt Disney: The Triumph of the American Imagination. Vintage Books. ISBN 978-0-679-75747-4.
