= Once Upon a Halloween =

- British DVD cover
- Directed by: Jamie Mitchell
- Starring: Susanne Blakeslee; Corey Burton
- Production company: Walt Disney Home Entertainment (Note: Clip scenes featured were animated by Walt Disney Feature Animation.)
- Distributed by: Buena Vista Home Entertainment
- Release date: 28 September 2005
- Running time: 53 minutes
- Country: United Kingdom
- Language: English

Once Upon a Halloween is a 2005 British direct-to-video animated fantasy film featuring the Evil Queen (from Snow White and the Seven Dwarfs) and Disney Villains. Similar to several Disney villains-themed episodes from Disney anthology television series, or the 1983 television special A Disney Halloween, the film is an anthology that features clips from Disney animated films focused on Disney villains, plus shorts and songs. While the scenes shown as flashbacks are from traditional animated films, the original scenes of the film featuring the Evil Queen with her cauldron were animated in CGI.

== Plot ==
On the night before Halloween, the Evil Queen from Snow White and the Seven Dwarfs plans to conquer Halloween, and asks her cauldron to show several villains, to which one of them helps her in her evil plan, such as Peg Leg Pete from Mickey & Friends (in his role as Tiny Tom in Officer Duck), Ursula from The Little Mermaid, Captain Hook from Peter Pan, Yzma from The Emperor's New Groove, Professor Ratigan from The Great Mouse Detective, Alameda Slim from Home on the Range, and Judge Claude Frollo from The Hunchback of Notre Dame. The cauldron also explains its origins and the Horned King, both from The Black Cauldron. In the end the cauldron makes the Evil Queen disappear, foiling her plan to take over Halloween.

== Cast ==
- Susanne Blakeslee as the Evil Queen
- Corey Burton as Cauldron
- Pat Carroll as Performer of "Sidekicks and Henchmen"; Ursula (archive voice)

Archive footage voice cast include:

- Grant Bardsley as Taran
- Susan Sheridan as Princess Eilonwy
- Nigel Hawthorne as Fflewddur Fflam
- John Byner as Gurgi
- Eda Reiss Merin as Orddu
- Adele Malis-Morey as Orwen
- Billie Hayes as Orgoch
- Clarence Nash as Donald Duck
- Billy Bletcher as Tiny Tom (Peg Leg Pete)
- Jodi Benson as Ariel
- Hans Conried as Captain Hook
- Bill Thompson as Mr. Smee
- Eartha Kitt as Yzma
- Patrick Warburton as Kronk
- Vincent Price as Professor Ratigan
- Candy Candido as Fidget
- Alan Young as Mr. Flaversham
- Susanne Pollatschek as Olivia Flaversham
- Randy Quaid as Alameda Slim
- Sam J. Levine as the Willie Brothers
- Tony Jay as Judge Claude Frollo
- John Hurt as the Horned King
- Phil Fondacaro as Creeper

== See also ==
- List of films set around Halloween
- Disney Villains
- "Our Unsung Villains" (1956)
- "Disney's Greatest Villains" (1977)
- "Halloween Hall o' Fame" (1977)
- "A Disney Halloween" (1981)
- "Disney's Halloween Treat" (1982)
- "A Disney Halloween" (1983)
- Mickey's House of Villains (2002)
