= The Bluegrass Special =

- The Wonderful World of Disney episode
- Episode no.: Season 23; Episode 21
- Directed by: Andrew V. McLaglen
- Story by: James Algar
- Teleplay by: Sheldon Stark
- Cinematography by: Duke Callaghan
- Editing by: Gordon D. Brenner
- Original air date: May 22, 1977
- Running time: 60 minutes

Guest appearances
- William Windom (Phil Wainright); Celeste Holm (Deirdre Wainwright); Devon Ericson (Penny Wainwright); Davy Jones (Davey Sanders)

Episode chronology
← Previous "Disney's Greatest Villains"	Next → "Gus"

"The Bluegrass Special" is a 1977 episode of The Wonderful World of Disney starring William Windom, Celeste Holm, Devon Ericson and Davy Jones which originally aired on NBC on May 22, 1977.

== Synopsis ==
Penny is a teenage horse trainer with a dream of becoming a jockey. She picks Woodhill to compete in the upcoming Bluegrass Special; Woodhill is a race horse with a bad reputation who threw and injured his rider during a race in Tijuana.

== Cast ==
- William Windom as Phil Wainright
- Celeste Holm as Deirdre Wainwright
- Devon Ericson as Penny Wainwright
- Davy Jones as Davey Sanders

== Home video ==
On April 26, 2009, "The Bluegrass Special" was released as a Disney Movie Club exclusive DVD, available only to club members for mail or online ordering.
