= Trick or Treat (1952 film) =

1952 Donald Duck cartoon

- Theatrical release poster
- Directed by: Jack Hannah
- Story by: Ralph Wright
- Produced by: Walt Disney
- Starring: June Foray; Clarence Nash; The Mellomen
- Music by: Paul J. Smith
- Animation by: Volus Jones; Bill Justice; George Kreisl; Don Lusk; Dan MacManus (effects)
- Layouts by: Yale Gracey
- Backgrounds by: Yale Gracey
- Color process: Technicolor
- Production company: Walt Disney Productions
- Distributed by: RKO Radio Pictures
- Release date: October 10, 1952
- Running time: 8 minutes
- Country: United States
- Language: English

Trick or Treat is a 1952 animated short film produced by Walt Disney Productions and released by RKO Radio Pictures. The cartoon, which takes place on Halloween night, follows a series of pranks between Donald Duck and his three nephews with Witch Hazel. The film was directed by Jack Hannah and features the voices of Clarence Nash as Donald and his nephews, and June Foray as Hazel.

The film introduced the song "Trick or Treat for Halloween" which was written by Mack David, Al Hoffman, and Jerry Livingston and performed by The Mellomen.

== Plot ==
The film opens with the song "Trick or Treat for Halloween", the lyrics of which tell the film's moral – one must be generous on Halloween or face trouble.

One Halloween night, a witch named Hazel takes great joy in scaring bats on a clock tower and a cat on fence. But then she gets scared by a jack-o'-lantern and hides behind a tree. The jack-o-lantern turns out to be part of Huey, Dewey, and Louie’s costumes as they go trick-or-treating. When the trio goes to their uncle Donald Duck's house, Donald decides to prank the boys (giving them a "trick" instead of a treat). Instead of giving them candy, he puts firecrackers in their bags and then pulls a string that dumps a bucket of water on their heads. After Donald bids farewell to the boys, the discouraged nephews go and sit on the curb.

Hazel, who was watching the drama unfold, approaches the boys and when she discovers that they believe in witches, Hazel happily offers to help them get their treats from Donald. At first, she tries to kindly convince Donald but he skeptically retorts, yanks on her stretchy nose, and dumps the bucket of water on her head, not believing she is a real witch. Realizing that the job may be harder than anticipated, Hazel tells the boys she will use her magic for this situation. In another location, a scene paying homage to Shakespeare's Macbeth shows Hazel and the nephews concocting a magic potion, adding somewhat more whimsical ingredients than the Three Witches in Macbeth (such as, "Eye of needle, tongue of shoe, hand of clock that points at two!", etc.). After testing the potion, Hazel fills an insecticide sprayer (similar in appearance to a Flit gun) with the potion and returns to Donald's house with the nephews.

Upon arriving back at Donald's house, Hazel sprays the potion on an assortment of objects (a jack-o'-lantern, a can of paint, three fence posts that turn into ghosts, and a gate) causing them to become animated or anthropomorphic. Donald, stunned at the magic being displayed before him, immediately gives in and agrees to treat his nephews, but when Hazel refers to him as a pushover, he changes his mind, locks his pantry and swallows the key. Hazel uses the potion on Donald's feet to give her control of their maneuverability and commands them to kick out the key, causing Donald to perform a crazy dance while Hazel plays her broom like a guitar and sings to the dance. This also causes Donald to get his rear poked by a cactus that was turned big by Hazel and burned by the fireplace, successfully getting the key out of his stomach. However, Donald makes the situation worse by throwing the key under the pantry door. Enraged, Hazel casts a spell "that's double-grim!" on Donald's feet by spraying them even harder and ordering them to "smash that door down" with Donald. This is initially unsuccessful, so Hazel commands him to take a longer start, and he runs even faster right before he rams down the pantry door and is left unconscious on the floor in defeat.

In the end, Huey, Dewey, and Louie collect their treats and wave goodbye to Hazel as she flies off into the night. A final shot shows the enchanted jack-o'-lantern from earlier suddenly popping onto the screen saying "Boo!" to the viewers before smiling.

== Voice cast ==
- Clarence Nash as Donald Duck, Huey, Dewey, Louie, the Scaredy Cat
- June Foray as Hazel the Witch
- Lucille La Verne as Hazel's scream (Archive audio)
- Jimmy MacDonald as Beelzebub
- The Mellomen as Fencepost Ghosts
- Thurl Ravenscroft as Jack-o'lantern

== Adaptations ==
The cover of Donald Duck #26 featuring "Trick or Treat".

A print adaptation by Carl Barks was published simultaneously in the Donald Duck comic book. Barks was given a storyboard of the film by Ralph Wright while production of the film was still in progress. Barks was asked to create a 32-page comic adaptation, yet Barks did not believe he had enough material. In the end, he wound up making a lot of his own material, creating new characters such as Smorgie the Bad, a villainous six-armed ogre serving Witch Hazel.

When the final product was sent to the publisher, Barks' segment with Smorgie was rejected, and the story was cut to 27 pages. To fill out the rest of the comic book, Barks created an additional story called "Hobblin' Gobblins". The original story was later restored with the publication of the Carl Barks Library.

Disneyland Records also produced an audio adaptation that was narrated by Ginny Tyler. This version was 12 minutes long and also included a song and story from the Haunted Mansion Disneyland attraction.

== Releases ==
- 1952 - original theatrical release
- 1957 - Disneyland, episode #3.15: "All About Magic" (TV)
- 1972 - The Mouse Factory, episode #1.4: "Spooks and Magic" (TV)
- 1977 - The Wonderful World of Disney episode #5: "Halloween Hall o' Fame" (TV)
- 1983 - A Disney Halloween (TV Special)
- 1998 - The Ink and Paint Club, episode #1.34: "Donald's Nephews" (TV)
- 2002 - Mickey's House of Villains (DTV)
- 2010 - 13 Nights of Halloween (TV)

== Home media ==
The short was released on November 11, 2008, on Walt Disney Treasures: The Chronological Donald, Volume Four: 1951-1961.

Additional releases include:

- c. 1965 - Super 8 release
- 1990 - Cartoon Classics: Halloween Haunts (VHS)
- 2000 - The Legend of Sleepy Hollow, Gold Classics Collection (VHS and DVD)
- 2000 - The Black Cauldron, Gold Classics Collection (VHS and DVD)
- 2001 - Disney Cartoon Classics - Birdbrain Donald (international Video CD release)
- 2002 - Mickey's House of Villains (VHS and DVD; included within the film's plot)
- 2010 - The Black Cauldron, 25th Anniversary Edition (DVD)
- 2020 - Disney+ release (streaming)
- 2021 - The Black Cauldron, Disney Movie Club exclusive (Blu-ray)

== See also ==
- List of films set around Halloween
