= Halloween Hall o' Fame =

- The Wonderful World of Disney episode
- Episode no.: Season 24; Episode 5
- Directed by: Arthur J. Vitarelli
- Written by: George Petlowany
- Cinematography by: Frank Phillips
- Original air date: October 30, 1977
- Running time: 60 minutes

Guest appearances
- Jonathan Winters as The Watchman and Jack-o'-lantern

Episode chronology
← Previous "The Incredible Journey"	Next → "The Mouseketeers at Walt Disney World"

"Halloween Hall o' Fame" is a 1977 Halloween-themed episode of The Wonderful World of Disney which originally aired on October 30, 1977.

== Synopsis ==
Jonathan Winters stars as a night watchman working late at Walt Disney Studios on Halloween night. He is accompanied by his dog, Peanuts. The night watchman, bitter about working on Halloween night, stumbles upon the prop room at the studio and begins acting out scenes with various props. Eventually, he finds a crystal ball and removes a blanket containing a talking Jack-o'-lantern (also played by Winters). Jack-o'-lantern is hiding out from Halloween because it's no longer scary like it was back in "the olden days". The night watchman disagrees with Jack and tells him that he oughta be ashamed of himself for hiding out on Halloween.

The dialogue between the night watchman and the jack-o'-lantern is interspersed with four Halloween-related Disney cartoons that jack-o'-lantern shows the night watchman in his crystal ball and which the audience gets to enjoy. After the cartoons, the night watchman provokes the jack-o'-lantern to come out of hiding from the crystal ball and celebrate Halloween the way he’s supposed to because the trick or treaters are counting on him to show up tonight. Then, jack-o'-lantern uses his magic powers to switch places with the night watchman and since Jack doesn’t have a body of his own, he uses the Night Watchman’s body until he gets back. He laughs and heads out into the night to mix with the trick or treaters. Meanwhile, the night watchman says that it looks like he's going to have a nice Halloween after all and incidentally if they see Mr. Pumpkin Head on their block tonight he tells them to have him come back before midnight or else.

== Featured cartoons ==
- Trick or Treat (1952) – Donald Duck, Huey, Dewey and Louie and Witch Hazel
- Lonesome Ghosts (1937) – Mickey Mouse, Donald Duck and Goofy
- Pluto's Judgement Day (1935) – Pluto and Mickey Mouse
- The Legend of Sleepy Hollow (as part of The Adventures of Ichabod and Mr. Toad) (1949) – Ichabod Crane and Headless Horseman

== Notes ==
The syndicated versions did not include Lonesome Ghosts (1937) and often played along with "Disney's Scary Tales of Halloween" (1986).

== See also ==
- "Our Unsung Villains" (1956)
- "Disney's Greatest Villains" (1977)
- "A Disney Halloween" (1981)
- "Disney's Halloween Treat" (1982)
- "A Disney Halloween" (1983)
- Mickey's House of Villains (2002)
- Once Upon a Halloween (2005)
