= Officer Duck =

1939 Donald Duck cartoon

- Theatrical release poster
- Directed by: Clyde Geronimi
- Produced by: Walt Disney
- Color process: Technicolor
- Production company: Walt Disney Productions
- Distributed by: RKO Radio Pictures
- Release date: September 22, 1939
- Running time: 7 minutes
- Language: English

Officer Duck is a Donald Duck short film which is produced in Technicolor by Walt Disney Productions and released September 22, 1939 by RKO Radio Pictures. This cartoon marked the first appearance of Pete in a Donald Duck series cartoon.

== Plot ==
Police officer Donald Duck is asked to capture a terrible criminal named Tiny Tom (Pete).

Donald starts his mission by finding Tom's decrepit house. Donald nervously tells Tom—who is much bigger and stronger than Donald—that he is under arrest. Tom angrily kicks Donald out.

Donald decides to use a different strategy by pretending to be an abandoned baby, and subsequently gains Tom's sympathy. When Tom spots handcuffs in the baby crib, Donald shakes them noisily, convincing Tom that the handcuffs are being used as a baby rattle. As Tom continues to play with Donald as if he were a baby, Donald repeatedly tries and fails to steal the gun from Tom's pocket.

Donald finally manages to handcuff Tom, and then tricks him into giving him the gun by throwing a tantrum. Donald removes his baby costume, revealing his police uniform. An enraged Tom, realizing that he has been tricked, chases Donald, and threatens to rip him into pieces. Luckily for Donald, a large group of police are marching by on parade, blocking the road. Tom turns around, followed by Donald and the rest of the marching police officers. Donald salutes proudly.

== Voice cast ==
- Clarence Nash as Donald Duck
- Billy Bletcher as Tiny Tom

== Home media ==
The short was released on May 18, 2004, on Walt Disney Treasures: The Chronological Donald, Volume One: 1934-1941.

== Legacy ==
The short is part of the direct-to-video anthology film Once Upon a Halloween (2005), where it is shown as a flashback.

Pete wears the same clothes from this short in the 2023 short film Once Upon a Studio.
