= Disney's Greatest Villains =

- The Wonderful World of Disney episode
- Episode no.: Season 23; Episode 20
- Original air date: May 15, 1977
- Running time: 60 minutes

Guest appearance
- Hans Conried

Episode chronology
← Previous "The Castaway Cowboy"	Next → "The Bluegrass Special"

"Disney's Greatest Villains" is a 1977 episode of The Wonderful World of Disney which originally aired on NBC on May 15, 1977.

== Synopsis ==
A follow-up to the 1956 episode "Our Unsung Villains", this updated version was used to showcase Madame Medusa, the newest villainess in the then upcoming animated film, The Rescuers. Hans Conried reprises his role as the Magic Mirror from "Our Unsung Villains" and other television specials to host the program. The Magic Mirror explains the importance of villains and introduces clips of various Disney villains while also providing biased, yet humorous, commentary. Most of the villains received a good-sized clip from their respective films, although some were featured in very brief 30-second segments. One sidenote is that the music featured in Madame Medusa's segment was not used in The Rescuers.

"Disney's Greatest Villains" would be shown again in reruns, the last time being on the Vault Disney block of programming on the Disney Channel. In 1983, portions of "Disney's Greatest Villains" were incorporated into the 90-minute special "A Disney Halloween".

== Featured villains ==
- Captain Hook – Peter Pan (1953)
- The Evil Queen – Snow White and the Seven Dwarfs (1937)
- Madam Mim – The Sword in the Stone (1963)
- Maleficent – Sleeping Beauty (1959)
- Lady Tremaine – Cinderella (1950)
- Cruella de Vil – One Hundred and One Dalmatians (1961)
- The Queen of Hearts – Alice in Wonderland (1951)
- Madame Medusa – The Rescuers (1977)
- Edgar – The Aristocats (1970)
- Willie the Giant – Mickey and the Beanstalk segment of Fun and Fancy Free (1947)
- Shere Khan and Kaa – The Jungle Book (1967)

== See also ==
- "Our Unsung Villains" (1956)
- "Halloween Hall o' Fame" (1977)
- "A Disney Halloween" (1981)
- "Disney's Halloween Treat" (1982)
- "A Disney Halloween" (1983)
- Mickey's House of Villains (2002)
- Once Upon a Halloween (2005)
