= Mickey's House of Villains =

2002 American animated comedy film

- Home video release poster
- Directed by: Jamie Mitchell; Roberts Gannaway; Tony Craig; Rick Calabash; Mike Moon
- Written by: Thomas Hart; Kevin Campbell; Elizabeth Stonecipher; Roberts Gannaway; Henry Gilroy; Jymn Magon
- Based on: House of Mouse by: Roberts Gannaway Tony Craig; Mickey Mouse; Walt Disney Ub Iwerks
- Produced by: Melinda Rediger
- Starring: Wayne Allwine; Russi Taylor; Tony Anselmo; Bill Farmer; Scott Weinger; Jonathan Freeman; Susanne Blakeslee; Corey Burton; James Woods; Pat Carroll
- Narrated by: John Cleese (Mickey's Mechanical House)
- Music by: Michael Tavera
- Production company: Walt Disney Television Animation
- Distributed by: Buena Vista Home Entertainment (Note: Distributed under the Walt Disney Home Entertainment imprint.)
- Release date: September 3, 2002
- Running time: 70 minutes
- Country: United States
- Language: English

Mickey's House of Villains is a 2002 American direct-to-video animated comedy horror crossover film produced by Walt Disney Television Animation. It is based on the animated television series House of Mouse, and serves as a stand-alone sequel to the 2001 direct-to-video animated film Mickey's Magical Christmas: Snowed in at the House of Mouse, starring Mickey Mouse, Donald Duck, Minnie Mouse, Goofy, Daisy Duck, and Disney Villains that appeared in past Disney productions. It was released on both VHS and DVD by Buena Vista Home Entertainment on September 3, 2002.

== Plot ==
It is Halloween night at the House of Mouse and a lot of villains are showing up. Jafar has a trick in store for the staff and he plans to unleash it at midnight. Donald enters a costume contest and tries to come up with the winning costume.

After a series of cartoons, Jafar, along with other villains joining his plan, takes over the House and transforms it into the House of Villains. The non-villains are imprisoned in the kitchen while the staff are thrown outside.

Mickey, Donald, and Goofy try to take the House back but Chernabog stops them from entering the building as the villains start to show cartoons that are grimmer in nature. Minnie tries to take back the House herself, but she is dragged away by Captain Hook.

Mickey dresses in his sorcerer outfit from The Sorcerer's Apprentice and challenges Jafar to a magical duel. When Jafar causes Mickey’s sorcerer hat to be knocked off of Mickey’s head, Aladdin and the magic carpet escape from the kitchen and Aladdin gives Daisy his lamp. She, Goofy, Donald and Minnie give it to Mickey, who sucks Jafar inside of it while the rest of the villains flee.

After the House of Villains transforms back into the House of Mouse, the non-villains are freed from the kitchen and the House of Mouse goes back to normal. Mickey announces Goofy, who is dressed as Jafar, as the winner of the costume contest, much to Donald’s frustration.

== Voice cast ==
- Wayne Allwine as Mickey Mouse
- Russi Taylor as Minnie Mouse
- Bill Farmer as Goofy/Pluto
- Tony Anselmo as Donald Duck, Huey, Dewey and Louie
- Tress MacNeille as Daisy Duck/Queen of Hearts/The Fates/Si and Am
- Jonathan Freeman as Jafar
- Gilbert Gottfried as Iago
- Corey Burton as Captain Hook/Chernabog/How-to Narrator
- Susanne Blakeslee as Cruella de Vil
- Pat Carroll as Ursula
- James Woods as Hades
- Bobcat Goldthwait as Pain
- Matt Frewer as Panic
- Lois Nettleton as Maleficent
- John Cleese as Narrator (Mickey's Mechanical House)
- Jim Cummings as Zeke Midas Wolf/Kaa/Ed
- Scott Weinger as Aladdin
- April Winchell as Clarabelle Cow
- Rod Roddy as Mike the Microphone

== Cartoons ==
(shown in sequential order)

- Trick or Treat (1952)
- Mickey's Mechanical House (1999)
- How to Haunt a House (1999)
- Lonesome Ghosts (1937)
- Dance of the Goofys (1999)
- Donald Duck and the Gorilla (1944)
- Donald's Halloween Scare (2000)
- Hansel and Gretel (1999)

In addition, certain pieces of animation in the House of Mouse segments are recycled from the series' episodes "Halloween with Hades" and "House Ghosts".

== Production ==
Mickey's House of Villains was produced by Walt Disney Television Animation, with animation production by Toon City Animation and additional animation production by Walt Disney Feature Animation Florida. The events of the film take place during the third season of House of Mouse.

== See also ==
- List of films set around Halloween
- "Our Unsung Villains" (1956)
- "Disney's Greatest Villains" (1977)
- "Halloween Hall o' Fame" (1977)
- "A Disney Halloween" (1981)
- "Disney's Halloween Treat" (1982)
- "A Disney Halloween" (1983)
- Once Upon a Halloween (2005)
- Welcome to the Club (2022)
- The Most Wonderful Time of the Year (2024)
