= Lonesome Ghosts =

1937 Mickey Mouse cartoon

- Theatrical release poster
- Directed by: Burt Gillett
- Story by: Dick Friel
- Produced by: Walt Disney
- Starring: Walt Disney; Clarence Nash; Pinto Colvig; Billy Bletcher; Don Brodie; Jack Bergman; Harry Stanton
- Music by: Albert Hay Malotte
- Animation by: Character animation: Art Babbitt; Rex Cox; Clyde Geronimi; Dick Huemer; Milt Kahl; Isadore Klein; Ed Love; Bob Wickersham; Dick Williams; Marvin Woodward (all uncredited); Additional character animation: Don Williams (uncredited)
- Color process: Technicolor
- Production company: Walt Disney Productions
- Distributed by: RKO Radio Pictures
- Release date: December 24, 1937 (Christmas Eve)
- Running time: 9 minutes
- Country: United States
- Language: English

Lonesome Ghosts is a 1937 Disney animated cartoon, released through RKO Radio Pictures on Christmas Eve. It was directed by Burt Gillett and animated by Izzy (Isadore) Klein, Ed Love, Milt Kahl, Marvin Woodward, Bob Wickersham, Clyde Geronimi, Dick Huemer, Dick Williams, Art Babbitt and Rex Cox. In the cartoon, a quartet of ghosts named Jasper, Grubb, Boo and Moss are bored because they have scared away all of the inhabitants of a haunted house. The ghosts decide to hire Mickey Mouse, Donald Duck and Goofy, who are ghost exterminators, in order to prank them. It was the 98th short in the Mickey Mouse film series to be released, and the ninth for that year. This short marked the first use of one of Goofy's catchphrases, "Somethin' wrong here!".

It is often speculated that this cartoon was an inspiration for Ghostbusters. The phrase "I ain't scared of no ghost" occurs in this cartoon, a similar line to that used in the bridge of the 1984 film's theme song written by Ray Parker Jr. In the 1987 Halloween special DTV Monster Hits, the song is matched to an edited version of the cartoon.

== Plot ==
On a snowy night, a quartet of ghosts named Jasper, Boo, Moss and Grubb are alone inside a haunted house, complaining about how there is no one remaining inside the house to scare. Moss finds an advertisement in a newspaper for the Ajax Ghost Exterminators whose members consist of Mickey Mouse, Donald Duck and Goofy. The ghosts decide to hire them in order to prank them. At their work building, the ghost exterminators are sleeping until their telephone rings. They get the ghosts’ call with Grubb impersonating a woman while claiming that the house is haunted.

When they arrive at the house, Mickey knocks on the front door but no one answers. He knocks on it again, causing it to fall down. He announces their arrival but they discover that there is no one inside. While they tiptoe into the house, the door lifts up and throws them inside before putting itself back in place, causing their stuff to fly everywhere, including a mousetrap which falls shut on Goofy's nose. After hearing the ghosts’ laughter, Mickey decides that he, Donald and Goofy should split up in order to surround them.

Jasper knocks Mickey on the head and Mickey tries to shoot him but Jasper blocks his gun’s barrels with his fingers, causing it to explode. Mickey chases Jasper upstairs and tries to open a door that he disappears into, which falls down, revealing nothing behind it. All of the ghosts, forming a marching band, come out of the fallen door and go into another. When Mickey opens the door, water pours out. Jasper, Boo and Moss surf on surfboards and Grubb drives a motorboat that goes in a circle around Mickey until the ghosts and water disappear.

After Grubb scares Donald with the sounds of breaking dishes and rattling chains, he whacks him in the butt with a wooden board twice. Donald punches Grubb, who falls on the floor but he transforms into water and disappears. Grubb comes out of the floor and spits water at Donald's face before disappearing again when Donald tries to follow him. Donald gets soaked with water when he puts his hat back on.

Moss bangs a wooden spoon on a pan and plays a trombone, scaring Goofy into running into a bedroom. When Moss kicks his butt, he chases him into a dresser and sees Moss in the mirror instead of his reflection. After a mirror gag, Moss pokes Goofy in the eyes. Goofy becomes tangled in the dresser and stabs his butt with a pin when he mistakes his pants for the ghost's.

The ghosts shove Goofy and the dresser into the basement where Mickey and Donald are. Mickey and Donald take cover behind boxes of molasses, flour and syrup that the dresser crashes into, causing the trio to be covered in the ingredients. This makes them look like ghosts which scares the actual ghosts out of the house. The trio walk up to a window that the ghosts crashed through and triumphantly watch them run off, while also not sure how they were driven out. Donald closes the short with calling the ghosts sissies and laughing.

== Voice cast ==
- Mickey Mouse: Walt Disney
- Donald Duck: Clarence Nash
- Goofy: Pinto Colvig
- Jasper, Boo, and Moss: Don Brodie, Jack Bergman, Harry Stanton
- Grubb: Billy Bletcher

== Releases ==
- 1937 – theatrical release
- 1954 – Disneyland, episode #1.1: "The Disneyland Story" (TV)
- 1963 – theatrical re-release with The Sword in The Stone
- 1968 – Walt Disney's Wonderful World of Color, episode #15.11: "The Mickey Mouse Anniversary Show" (TV)
- c. 1972 – The Mouse Factory, episode #5: "Spooks and Magic" (TV)
- c. 1977 – The Wonderful World of Disney episode #5: "Halloween Hall o' Fame" (TV)
- c. 1983 – Good Morning, Mickey!, episode #79 (TV)
- 1983 – A Disney Halloween (TV)
- c. 1997 – The Ink and Paint Club, episode #22: "Classic Mickey" (TV)
- c. 1998 – The Ink and Paint Club, episode #55: "Oooh! Scary!" (TV)
- 2009 – Have a Laugh!, episode #1 (TV)
- 2010 – 13 Nights of Halloween

== Home media ==
The short was released on December 4, 2001, on Walt Disney Treasures: Mickey Mouse in Living Color.

Additional releases include:

- 1982 – bonus on The Legend of Sleepy Hollow (VHS)
- 1989 – Cartoon Classics: Halloween Haunts (VHS)
- 2000 – bonus on The Adventures of Ichabod and Mr. Toad (DVD)
- 2002 – Mickey's House of Villains (VHS and DVD; included within the film's plot)
- 2010 – Have a Laugh! Volume One" (DVD)
- 2019 – Disney+ release
- 2023 – Mickey & Friends: 10 Classic Shorts - Volume 2 (Blu-ray)

== In other media ==
- An edited (and silent) version of the cartoon was released as a cartridge for the Fisher-Price Movie Viewer, a small crank-operated toy.
- In 1957, the scream sound effect heard at the beginning of this short was used in the fourth episode of Zorro, "The Ghost of the Mission", which appropriately aired on Halloween.
- In 1977, singer/songwriter Rod McKuen used the scream sound effect as well as the ghosts' laughter in his instrumental song "Full Moon over the Ansonia Hotel" on his album "Slide... Easy In".
- A snippet was used telling about New Year's superstitions near the end of Disney's "Wonderful World of Winter" 1983 educational short.
- The Lonesome Ghosts appear as helpers in the video game Disney's Magical Quest 2 Starring Mickey & Minnie.
- Lonesome Ghosts was the basis for, and title of the fourth level in the video game Mickey Mania: The Timeless Adventures of Mickey Mouse, and its PlayStation version, Mickey's Wild Adventure.
- A scene from Lonesome Ghosts with new music appears in Disney's Magical Mirror Starring Mickey Mouse.
- The Lonesome Ghosts and The Ajax Ghost Exterminators were incorporated into a painting by artist Randy Souders. Entitled "A Haunting We Will Go", it was created for the 1997 Disneyana Convention at Walt Disney World.
- Lonesome Ghosts also appeared in an episode of Sing Me a Story with Belle.
- The ghosts make a cameo in the episode "When the Spirit Moves You" of the TV series Bonkers.
- In the "House Ghosts" episode of House of Mouse, The Lonesome Ghosts make a cameo scaring Pete during the musical number "Grim Grinning Ghosts". The Lonesome Ghosts also appear in the direct-to-video film Mickey's House of Villains, as part of the villains from the film, with the Lonesome Ghosts short being also seen by the characters during the film's plot.
- In the "Houseghosts" episode of The Wonderful World of Mickey Mouse, The Lonesome Ghosts appear to take advantage of Mickey's kindness and moved into his house after their house was torn down and become homeless for scaring the entire neighborhood.
- A shortened version aired on the Disney Channel in October 2009, as part of a show called Have a Laugh!, which featured remastered and redubbed versions of old cartoons.
- There is a travel map in the video game Epic Mickey based on this cartoon. The Lonesome Ghosts appear as Wasteland denizens and are named Gilbert, Ian, Gabriel, and Screechin' Sam.
- A newspaper clipping of the advertisement for The Ajax Ghost Exterminators is inside of the ticket booth of the El CapiTOON Theater, which houses the Mickey & Minnie's Runaway Railway attraction at Disneyland. In addition, Mickey, Donald and Goofy's telephone and the ghosts' dresser are on display inside the attraction's queue as props from the short, with the ghosts occasionally appearing in the dresser's mirror.

== See also ==
- List of ghost films
- Mickey Mouse (film series)
