= Our Unsung Villains =

- Disneyland episode
- Episode no.: Season 2 Episode 20
- Directed by: Hamilton Luske; Wilfred Jackson
- Written by: Carl Cons; Hamilton Luske
- Original air date: February 15, 1956

Guest appearance
- Hans Conried (Magic Mirror)

Episode chronology
← Previous "Survival in Nature"	Next → "A Trip Through Adventureland/Water Birds"

"Our Unsung Villains" is a 1956 episode of Disneyland which originally aired on ABC on February 15, 1956. It was repeated on June 10, 1960.

== Synopsis ==
The episode has Walt Disney handing over the hosting duties to the Magic Mirror, who promptly decides to do a show devoted to the Disney villains. Hans Conried plays the Magic Mirror from Snow White and the Seven Dwarfs and would reprise the role in many Disney television specials, including the 1977 follow-up episode "Disney's Greatest Villains." In this episode, the Magic Mirror only focuses on four villains, whereas he covers twelve in "Disney's Greatest Villains."

== Featured villains ==
- Big Bad Wolf – Three Little Wolves (1936)
- The Evil Queen – Snow White and the Seven Dwarfs (1937)
- Br'er Fox and Br'er Bear – Song of the South (1946)
- Captain Hook – Peter Pan (1953)

== Credits ==
- Disney's Sing-Along Songs I Love to Laugh clips courtesy of Walt Disney Home Video

== See also ==
- "Halloween Hall o' Fame" (1977)
- "Disney's Greatest Villains" (1977)
- "Disney's Greatest Villains" (1984)
- "Disney's Halloween Treat" (1982)
- "A Disney Halloween" (1983)
- Mickey's House of Villains (2002)
- Once Upon a Halloween (2005)
