= Maleficent =

Sleeping Beauty character

- Sleeping Beauty character
- Maleficent (along with her raven Diablo), as she appears in Disney's Sleeping Beauty
- First appearance: Sleeping Beauty (1959)
- Created by: Marc Davis; Eric Cleworth
- Based on: The Wicked Fairy by Charles Perrault
- Designed by: Marc Davis; Eyvind Earle
- Voiced by: Eleanor Audley (Sleeping Beauty); Linda Gary (Fantasmic! & Disney's Fantillusion); Lois Nettleton (House of Mouse); Susanne Blakeslee (2002–present); Tress MacNeille (Plusaversary)
- Portrayed by: Kristin Chenoweth (Descendants); Marissa Kruep (Descendants: The Rise of Red; as teenager)

In-universe information
- Species: Fairy
- Gender: Female
- Title: The Mistress of Evil
- Affiliation: Disney Villains
- Significant others: Hades (in House of Mouse and Descendants)
- Children: Mal (daughter; in Descendants)
- Home: The Forbidden Mountains

Maleficent (/məˈlɛfɪsənt/ or /məˈlɪfɪsənt/) is a fictional character who first appears in Disney Animation's 1959 film, Sleeping Beauty. Maleficent is the self-proclaimed "Mistress of All Evil" based on the wicked fairy character in Charles Perrault's fairy tale Sleeping Beauty, as well as the villainess who appears in the Brothers Grimm's retelling of the story, Little Briar Rose. Maleficent was originally animated by Marc Davis.

In the 1959 film, Maleficent was originally voiced by Eleanor Audley, who earlier voiced Lady Tremaine, Cinderella's evil stepmother, in Disney Animation's 1950 film Cinderella. Maleficent is represented as an evil fairy and the self-proclaimed "Mistress of All Evil" who, after not being invited to a christening, curses the infant Princess Aurora to "prick her finger on the spindle of a spinning wheel and die" before the sun sets on Aurora's sixteenth birthday.

A revision of the character appeared as the titular protagonist in the 2014 live-action film Maleficent, portrayed by Angelina Jolie, who reprised the role in the 2019 sequel Maleficent: Mistress of Evil. This version of Maleficent is portrayed as a sympathetic character, who is misunderstood in trying to protect herself and her domain from humans.

== Development ==
Maleficent was animated by Marc Davis, who also animated Aurora in the film. She was aptly named "Maleficent" (an adjective derived from the Latin maleficentia, which means "doing evil or harm"), and may have been based on earlier French and European myths and legends about the fairy Mélusine, especially in the 2014 live-action film of the same name. French historian Jean Markale suggested that the name "Mélusine" may have derived from the earlier Latin name Mala Lucina, with "Lucina" being an epithet of Juno, the Roman goddess of marriage and childbirth. In determining Maleficent's design, standard depictions of witches and hags were dismissed, as Davis had opted for an elegant, sinister, green-skinned beauty, depicted as "vain femme fatale, utilizing a classic archetype of a bad woman". According to Davis, Maleficent "was designed like a giant vampire bat to create a feeling of menace".

Maleficent was voiced by Eleanor Audley, who had previously performed Lady Tremaine, Cinderella's evil stepmother, in Disney's Cinderella (1950). Audley also provided some live-action recording for both of these characters to inspire the animators. In addition, dancer Jane Fowler performed some live-action reference for Maleficent. Animators Ollie Johnston and Frank Thomas, in their book The Disney Villain, describe animating Audley's voice as "a difficult assignment but a thrilling one, working to that voice track with so much innuendo, mixed in with the fierce power".

It was long rumored that Maleficent's likeness was inspired by actress Maila Nurmi, best known for her character Vampira, a camp icon that was created in 1953, and inspired by Morticia Addams from The Addams Family comic strip by Charles Addams for The New Yorker; the Dragon Lady from the comic strip Terry and the Pirates; and the Evil Queen from Disney's Snow White and the Seven Dwarfs (1937). In 2014, entries were discovered in Nurmi's journals describing sessions for Walt Disney in November 1956, and the Walt Disney Company was subsequently able to find archival documents corroborating Nurmi's participation as a "live-action reference" model for the character. Maleficent's likeness in the eponymous 2014 film, as portrayed by actress Angelina Jolie, was inspired by Lady Gaga's appearance in her music video "Born This Way" (2011).

For the scene when Maleficent transforms into a dragon in the original film, she was animated by Eric Cleworth, who said that the dragon was modeled on a rattlesnake, with "powerful muscles moving a bulky body over the rocky terrain". Sound effects artist Jimmy MacDonald searched for the sound of a dragon's fiery breath by requesting the United States Army to send him some training films on flame throwing, and these films provided just the right sound for him.

== Appearances ==
=== Sleeping Beauty ===
Maleficent transforms into a dragon at the film's climax.

In the animated film, where she is voiced by Eleanor Audley, Maleficent arrives at King Stefan and Queen Leah's castle during the christening of their newborn daughter, Princess Aurora. She expresses displeasure about not receiving an invitation, to which one of the good fairies named Merryweather replies that she was unwanted. Angered, she prepares to leave. Queen Leah asks her if she is offended, causing Maleficent to deny her rage, and subsequently offers to bestow a "gift" on Aurora to prove that she "bears no ill will". Maleficent confirms that Aurora will "grow in grace and beauty, beloved by all who know her", but as revenge for not being invited by the kingdom, she curses Aurora to die by sunset on her sixteenth birthday by pricking her finger on a spinning wheel's spindle. Before the Royal Guards can seize her, Maleficent disappears, laughing triumphantly. Though Merryweather still has her gift to bestow, she cannot dispel Maleficent's power, but she can weaken the curse: if Aurora was to prick her finger, she will not die, but only sleep until true love's kiss awakens her.

Later, at her castle in the Forbidden Mountains, a frustrated Maleficent asks her bestial army why they have been unable to find Aurora, who had been hidden and brought up by the three good fairies. Maleficent learns that they have focused on searching for a baby the entire time, even though 16 years have passed. She flies into a destructive rage, and soon desperately instructs her pet raven, Diablo, to find Aurora. The bird manages to succeed due to a magical quarrel between Merryweather and Flora, which exposes their location.

On Aurora's sixteenth birthday, after the three fairies have momentarily left the depressed princess alone in a castle room, Maleficent visits Aurora in the form of a will-o-the-wisp, luring the princess to a tower room where Maleficent transforms into a spinning wheel. The fairies, realizing their mistake, pursue Aurora to the tower room. Unfortunately, on Maleficent's command, Aurora pricks her finger on the spindle and falls into her foretold sleep. When Flora, Merryweather, and Fauna arrive too late, Maleficent appears and taunts them of their attempts of defeating her. Maleficent then reveals Aurora, shocking the fairies as she disappears, leaving the fairies heartbroken at what happened.

Later on, Maleficent and her goons capture Prince Phillip, Aurora's true love, and imprisons him. Maleficent then rests well, thinking she has triumphed. However, she later wakes up and by seeing that Diablo has been turned to stone, she discovers that the fairies have freed Phillip from her dungeon. She climbs to the top of one of her castle's towers and proceeds to blast Phillip with lightning, and after the good fairies foil these attempts, she summons a forest of thorns, through which Phillip slices his way out. Enraged, she blows away and confronts him in front of King Stefan's castle and transforms into a dragon. The three fairies enchant Phillip's Sword of Truth, which he throws into Maleficent's heart, mortally wounding her before she falls off the cliff to her death.

=== Maleficent film series ===
Maleficent
- Maleficent character
- Angelina Jolie as Maleficent in the 2014 live-action re-imagining film of the character
- First appearance: Maleficent (2014)
- Portrayed by: Angelina Jolie; Ella Purnell (Maleficent; as teenager); Isobelle Molloy (Maleficent; as child)
- Voiced by: Rajia Baroudi (Disney Infinity)

In-universe information
- Alias: The Mistress of Evil
- Title: Queen of the Moors
- Occupation: Protector of the Moors
- Children: Aurora (surrogate daughter)
- Home: The Moors

==== Maleficent ====
The 2014 live-action reboot presents Maleficent as a good-hearted but tragic fairy who defends the Moors, a realm of supernatural beings, from neighboring humans. She is played by Angelina Jolie.

Prior to the film's events, Maleficent was a benevolent fairy who possessed healing abilities and shared an immense fondness with all the denizens of her mystical domain. Maleficent befriends a thieving peasant boy named Stefan, upon being alerted to his presence by a trio of pixies: Knotgrass (Imelda Staunton), Thistletwit (Juno Temple), and Flittle (Lesley Manville).

As a young adult, Maleficent is betrayed by Stefan, who uses iron to burn off her wings so that he can succeed King Henry. After claiming a raven named Diaval (Sam Riley) as her henchman, Maleficent renames herself from guardian of the Moors to ruler of same. Both her clothing and realm turn dark, reflecting the hatred with which she is now consumed. When she learns that now-King Stefan and his Queen Leila have a newborn daughter named Aurora (Elle Fanning), Maleficent acts in the name of what she considers poetic justice by cursing the newborn Aurora to fall into a deathlike slumber on her 16th birthday; the spell can be broken only by the kiss of true love, which neither Maleficent nor Stefan believe in. Knotgrass, Thistletwit, and Flittle are assigned to look after Aurora until after her 16th birthday, but prove to be incompetent and negligent. To ensure that her curse comes to pass, Maleficent cares for and protects Aurora from afar. As Aurora grows, Maleficent recognizes the folly of punishing Stefan's daughter for something he alone did. This tender regard for Aurora enables Maleficent to undo the damage which she herself inflicted; after Philip's kiss fails to break the curse, Maleficent voices her regrets and herself kisses Aurora's brow. Roused from her enchanted sleep and now aware of her father's true nature, Aurora foils his efforts to destroy Maleficent by returning Maleficent's wings to her. Completely stripped of her bitterness and thirst for vengeance, Maleficent declares an end to her feud with Stefan, but the king, driven by shame too great to bear, attempts to kill her and himself, only to take a fatal fall from his castle's highest turret.

Following Aurora's ascension over her parents' domain, Maleficent crowns her to rule the Moors as well, with Diaval and Phillip looking on proudly.

==== Maleficent: Mistress of Evil ====
Angelina Jolie reprised the role in Maleficent: Mistress of Evil, in which Maleficent's relationship with Aurora was tested. Other fairies of her species appeared, led by Conall (Chiwetel Ejiofor). In the course of the film, Prince Philip's mother Ingrith (Michelle Pfeiffer) attempts to provoke a war between the humans and the fairies by creating the impression that Maleficent has cast another curse on the king, forcing Maleficent to flee the kingdom only to be rescued by others of her kind. During this time, Maleficent's species is identified as 'Dark Fey', although Maleficent's powers are unique to her due to her being the latest reincarnation of the powerful Phoenix. The queen nearly destroys the fairies after devising a cloud of red dust that will turn all fairies exposed to it into plants and luring them into a church for Aurora's wedding, but during the Dark Fey's attack on the kingdom, Aurora learns the truth and is able to convince both sides to stand down, Philip appealing to his own soldiers while Aurora confronts Maleficent. After asserting that she still regards Maleficent as her mother, Aurora is knocked off a tower by the queen, but Maleficent is able to save Aurora, ending the conflict when she breaks the curse on the King and turns the Queen into a goat. With peace restored, Maleficent walks Aurora down the aisle for her wedding to Philip, and later assures Aurora that she will return when their first child is born.

=== Descendants franchise ===
Kristin Chenoweth played Maleficent in Disney Channel live-action film Descendants (2015), which follows the teenage children of Disney's iconic heroes and villains, including Maleficent's daughter Mal. She is the main antagonist of the film, as well as the leader of the villains who have been imprisoned on the Isle of the Lost. In the prequel novel for the film, The Isle of the Lost, it is mentioned that she and the Evil Queen argued over being the ruler of the place. In the film, she longs to get the Fairy Godmother's magic wand, and combine it with her scepter in order to rule good and evil as she pleases, for which she entrusts her daughter with the task of stealing it. When she accidentally breaches the barrier surrounding the island, she and Maleficent escape from her and obtain the wand, freezing the inhabitants of Auradon on the spot. Mal confronts her mother with the help of her friends to recover the wand, with Maleficent having to transform into a dragon in the confrontation. However, the power that Mal possesses of her thanks to the friendship of her friends, helps her defeat her mother, transforming her into a lizard, and immediately afterwards being locked in a glass cabinet.

In the sequel Descendants 2 (2017), Maleficent continues in her lizard form, and is taken back by Mal to the Isle of the Lost, where she accidentally falls and ends up on the streets of the place. Although she does not appear in Descendants 3 (2019), it is revealed that Mal's father, and Maleficent's former mate, is Hades.

She appears in the animated television special Descendants: The Royal Wedding (2021), still turned into a lizard, where she attends Mal and Ben's wedding.

A teenage Maleficent appears in the spin-off film Descendants: The Rise of Red (2024), played by Marissa Kruep.

=== Television series ===
==== House of Mouse ====
Maleficent is a recurring character in the animated series House of Mouse, voiced by Lois Nettleton. She often has cameo appearances, having only a major role in the episode "Halloween with Hades", where Hades falls in love with her and tries to win her over. She also appeared as one of the villains in the series' direct-to-video film Mickey's House of Villains, where she takes part in the "It's Our House Now" musical number along with the other villains.

==== Once Upon a Time ====
Maleficent
- Once Upon a Time character
- First appearance: "The Thing You Love Most" (Season 1; Episode 2)
- Last appearance: "Leaving Storybrooke" (Season 7; Episode 22)
- Portrayed by: Kristin Bauer van Straten

In-universe information
- Species: Fairy/Dragon
- Title: Queen of Darkness
- Occupation: Sorceress
- Affiliation: Queens of Darkness (formerly)
- Significant other: Zorro
- Children: Lilith Page (daughter)

An alternate version of Maleficent appears in the ABC television series Once Upon a Time, played by Kristin Bauer van Straten.

She debuts in a flashback of the first season episode "The Thing You Love Most", where Regina (the Evil Queen) goes in search of her help, being Maleficent shown as a woman with curly blonde hair and wearing a pink dress. She was slain by Emma Swan in dragon form in the first season finale, "A Land Without Magic".

She later returns in an undead form in the second season episode "The Evil Queen", where Hook confronts her.

She acts as one of the main antagonists in the second half of the fourth season, where she is resurrected by Mr. Gold (Rumplestiltskin), appearing with a look more inspired by the animated version of Disney, and is part of a group known as the Queens of Darkness, along with Ursula and Cruella De Vil, and temporarily the Evil Queen. In dragon form, she mothered Lilith, and ends up making a deal with the protagonists to find her. In the series finale, it is mentioned in dialogue that Lilith's father was Zorro, whom no one knew could become a dragon.

In the spin-off series Once Upon a Time in Wonderland, Robin Hood and his Merry Men infiltrate Maleficent's castle in the episode "Forget Me Not". Although she does not make a physical appearance, and only her dragon roar is heard when she discovers that there are intruders.

=== Video games ===
==== Kingdom Hearts ====
Maleficent appears as one of the main antagonists in the Kingdom Hearts video game series, voiced by Susanne Blakeslee in the English versions and Toshiko Sawada in the Japanese versions. She seeks to take control of the many worlds and engulf them in darkness, with Pete acting as her second-in-command. She has appeared in nearly every game in the series.

She appears in the first Kingdom Hearts game (2002), as the leader of a group of villains who seek to dominate the worlds thanks to the darkness using the Heartless. She has her base of operations in the Hollow Bastion castle, where she faces the protagonist, Sora, who manages to defeat her.

In Kingdom Hearts: Chain of Memories (2004), Maleficent fills the same role as in the first game as a fragment of Sora's memories.

Maleficent is resurrected in Kingdom Hearts II (2005), where with Pete's help she tries to find a new base of operations and assemble a new group of villains.

She and Pete return in Kingdom Hearts Coded (2008), where they are transported into the Datascape to conquer the data worlds.

Maleficent's past is explored in Kingdom Hearts Birth by Sleep (2010), where she appears in her home world, Enchanted Dominion, fulfilling the same role as in Sleeping Beauty. Though she is defeated in her dragon form, she reverts to her first form and flees before she can be finished off.

In Kingdom Hearts 3D: Dream Drop Distance (2012), Maleficent and Pete invade Disney Castle and take Minnie hostage, but they are stopped in the act thanks to Lea.

She appears in Kingdom Hearts Union χ (2017) fulfilling the same role as in Birth by Sleep, as an image of the future events. After her defeat, she meets the Darkness, who tells her about her future.

During Kingdom Hearts III (2019), Maleficent and Pete focus on traveling the worlds in search of the Black Box.

==== Other games ====
- Maleficent appears as the final boss of the North American version of Mickey Mousecapade (1987), replacing the Queen of Hearts from the original Japanese version.
- Maleficent, modeled after the incarnation of the character in the 2014 film, appears as a playable character in the Disney Infinity series, voiced by Rajia Baroudi.
- Maleficent appears as the main antagonist in Disney Magic Kingdoms (2016), where she invokes the curse that plunges the titular Kingdom into darkness.
- The mobile game Disney Twisted-Wonderland (2020) is focused on Night Raven College, an academy whose students live in seven different dormitories based on different Disney Villains known as "The Big Seven", one of them being the Diasomnia dormitory, founded in honor of Maleficent. People of this world know Maleficent as "The Thorn Fairy," and students of the Diasomnia dorm are expected to emulate her qualities of "nobility." The character Malleus Draconia, housewarden of Diasomnia, is the Twisted Wonderland incarnation of Maleficent herself. Like Maleficent, Malleus is an extremely regal, powerful fairy, with the ability to wield lightning and transform himself into a dragon at will. Malleus also takes invitations very seriously, but often misses events due to his skewed sense of time.
- An alternate universe version of Maleficent appears as a playable character in Disney Mirrorverse (2022).
- Maleficent appears as a purchasable outfit in Fortnite Battle Royale (2024).
- Maleficent appears in the DLC "The Storybook Vale" (2024) of the video game Disney Dreamlight Valley as one of the villagers of the titular valley.

=== Theme parks ===
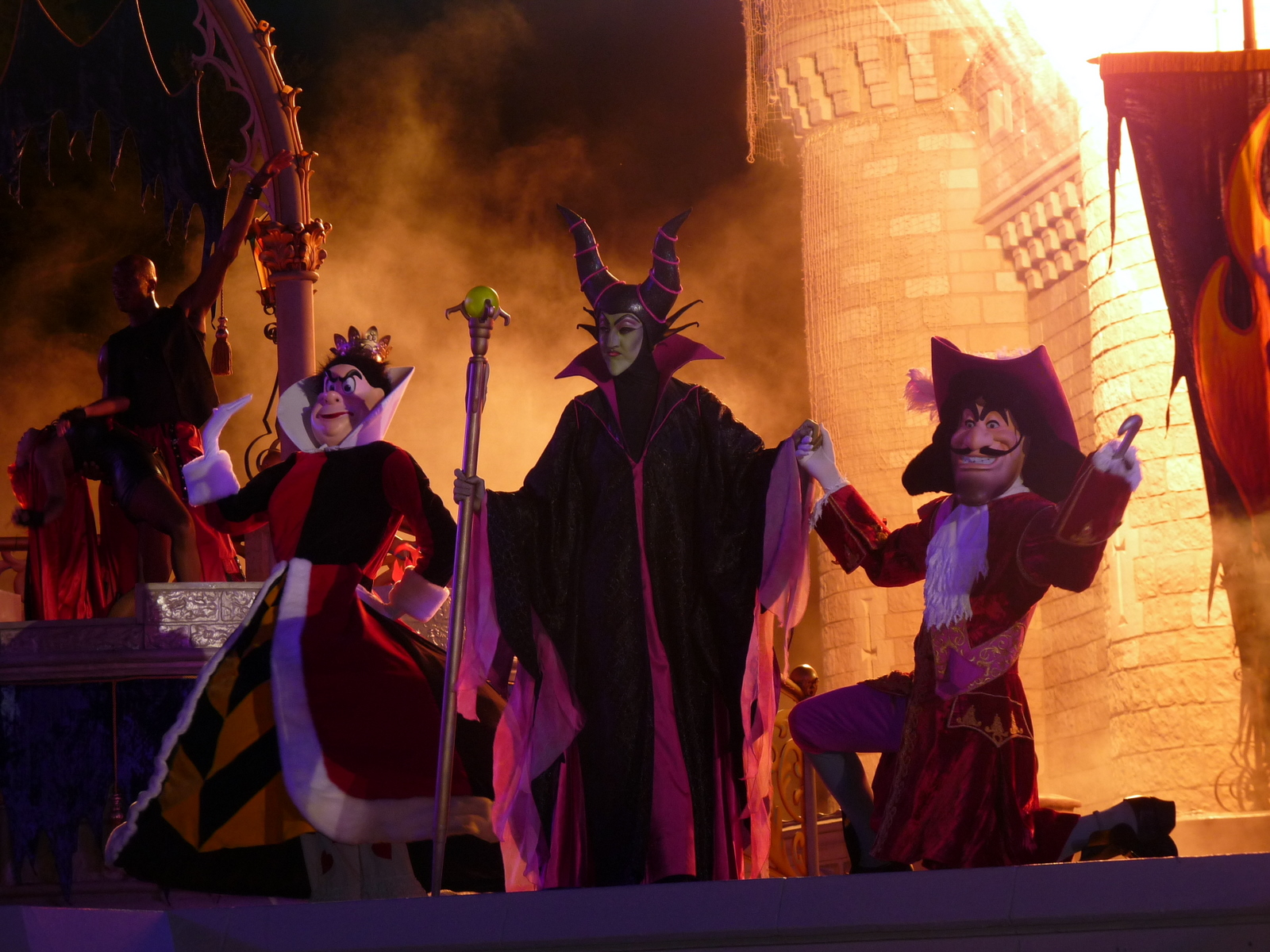
Maleficent along with Queen of Hearts (left) and Captain Hook (right) during Mickey's Not-So-Scary Halloween Party.

Maleficent sometimes appears in Disney Parks as a meet-and-greet character. She also appears in attractions and live shows, commonly involved with other Disney Villains, like Fantasmic! (voiced by Linda Gary), Mickey's Not-So-Scary Halloween Party, or Dream Along with Mickey. At Disneyland Paris an animatronic version of Maleficent's dragon form La Tanière du Dragon is located in the lower-level dungeon underneath Le Château de la Belle au Bois Dormant (Sleeping Beauty Castle).

=== Printed media ===
In the book series by Ridley Pearson, Kingdom Keepers, Maleficent appears as one of the first Overtakers encountered as she intends to leave the confines of Disney World to take over the world.

Maleficent was featured in the book sequel to Sleeping Beauty called Maleficent's Revenge.

Maleficent also appears as one of the villains in the 2005 Disney manga series Kilala Princess by Rika Tanaka and Nao Kodaka.

Maleficent is the protagonist in Serena Valentino's Disney Villains franchise book Mistress of All Evil: A Tale of the Dark Fairy.

=== The Simpsons shorts ===
In The Simpsons short Plusaversary (2021), Maleficent (voiced by Tress MacNeille) runs the check-in table to enter at the party in Moe's Tavern, denying access to Homer due to not being listed as part of the guests.

In another The Simpsons short, Welcome to the Club (2022), Maleficent appears along with other Disney Villains trying to convince Lisa Simpson how fun it is to be a villain.

=== Other appearances ===
- Maleficent appears in her dragon form as a minor antagonist in the Lego animated special Lego Disney Princess: The Castle Quest (2023), being a sidekick of Gaston, but after the princesses notice that her wing is damaged and help restore it, this leads to Maleficent siding with the princesses, and she defeats Gaston to help them.
- Maleficent has a cameo appearance in the short film Once Upon a Studio (2023), as part of the Walt Disney Animation Studios characters who gather to take a group photo.
- The DuckDuckGo search engine has a logo variant featuring the duck mascot in a Maleficent costume when searching for Maleficent.

== Reception ==
The original version of Maleficent has been called as "most menacing villains in the Disney canon". She is generally described as an "evil, cold hearted fairy who can curse an innocent baby just because she is not invited to the christening ceremony." Guillermo del Toro has stated that along with Vermithrax in Dragonslayer, Maleficent is his favorite cinematic dragon. Voice actress Eleanor Audley and supervising animator Marc Davis were also praised for their work on the character. In 2016, The Frisky described Maleficent and the Evil Queen as "two of the best-realized female villains in movie history."

Maleficent's live-action version from the film series of the same name has received critical attention, different from its original, animated counterpart. Benjamin Justice describes this version of Maleficent as "a full person, good and evil, powerful and vulnerable, vengeful and loving" and notes that, while she and Aurora value heterosexual relationships and love, neither of them "let the idea of [one true love] define the arc of the personal or public lives." When analyzing Maleficent's disability after she loses her wings due to Stephan's betrayal, Colleen Elaine Donnelly compares her role to that of Elphaba in Wicked, explaining that in both cases, the story "intends to reform the stereotype of the evil witch by providing a backstory."
