= The Adventures of Ichabod and Mr. Toad =

1949 American animated anthology film

- Theatrical release poster
- Directed by: Jack Kinney; Clyde Geronimi; James Algar
- Story by: Erdman Penner; Winston Hibler; Joe Rinaldi; Ted Sears; Homer Brightman; Harry Reeves
- Based on: The Wind in the Willows by Kenneth Grahame; "The Legend of Sleepy Hollow" by Washington Irving
- Produced by: Walt Disney
- Starring: Eric Blore; Pat O'Malley; John Ployardt; Colin Campbell; Campbell Grant; Claude Allister; The Rhythmaires
- Narrated by: Bing Crosby (The Legend of Sleepy Hollow); Basil Rathbone (The Wind in the Willows)
- Edited by: John O. Young
- Music by: Oliver Wallace
- Production company: Walt Disney Productions
- Distributed by: RKO Radio Pictures
- Release date: October 5, 1949
- Running time: 68 minutes
- Country: United States
- Language: English
- Box office: $1.625 million (worldwide rentals)

The Adventures of Ichabod and Mr. Toad is a 1949 American animated anthology film produced by Walt Disney Productions and released by RKO Radio Pictures. It consists of two segments: the first based on Kenneth Grahame's 1908 children's novel The Wind in the Willows and narrated by Basil Rathbone, and the second based on Washington Irving's 1820 short story "The Legend of Sleepy Hollow" and narrated by Bing Crosby. The production was supervised by Ben Sharpsteen, and was directed by Jack Kinney, Clyde Geronimi, and James Algar.

The Adventures of Ichabod and Mr. Toad began development in 1940 as a single-narrative feature film based on The Wind in the Willows. After a series of production delays, the project was cut down to a short film and eventually merged with The Legend of Sleepy Hollow (which was also originally conceived as a full-length feature) in 1947. It is the last of the studio's package film era of the 1940s; they returned to full-length animated films starting with Cinderella in 1950. Disney would not produce another package film until The Many Adventures of Winnie the Pooh (1977).

The Adventures of Ichabod and Mr. Toad was released in theaters on October 5, 1949. Beginning in 1955, the two segments of the film were separated, and televised as part of the Disneyland television series. They were later marketed and sold separately on home video.

== Plot ==
Both of the film's animated segments are introduced through live-action scenes set in a library as a framing device. The first segment (based on Kenneth Grahame's novel The Wind in the Willows) is introduced and narrated by Basil Rathbone; the second segment (based on Washington Irving's short story "The Legend of Sleepy Hollow") is introduced and narrated by Bing Crosby. Both narrators preface their stories by mentioning various literary characters from both English and American literature, before settling on the characters of Mr. Toad and Ichabod respectively for their tales.

=== The Wind in the Willows ===
In Great Britain in 1905, J. Thaddeus Toad is the wealthy owner of the Toad Hall estate in London, England, whose adventures and positive mania for various fads have brought him to the brink of bankruptcy. One of Toad's friends, Angus MacBadger, volunteers as an accountant to help Toad keep the estate, which is the pride of the community. One summer day, MacBadger asks Toad's best friends, Water Rat and Mole, to persuade him to give up his latest mania of recklessly driving around the countryside in a gypsy cart pulled by his horse Cyril Proudbottom, which is accumulating financial liability in damaged property. Rat and Mole confront Toad and unsuccessfully try to change his mind. Toad then sees a motor car for the first time and is taken over by motor mania.

To keep him out of trouble, Rat and Mole lock Toad in his bedroom, but he escapes and is soon charged with car theft. At his trial, Toad represents himself, with Cyril as his first witness. Cyril testifies that the car which Toad was accused of taking had been stolen by a gang of weasels. Unaware of this, Toad found weasels in a tavern and offered to buy the car from them, but since he had no money, he traded Toad Hall for the car. The court shows disbelief at the statement, so Toad calls Mr. Winky, the barman from the tavern, to testify in his favor. When Winky instead implicates Toad in trying to sell him the stolen car, Toad is found guilty on the spot and sentenced to imprisonment in the Tower of London. His friends try to appeal his case, but to no avail.

On Christmas Eve, Cyril visits Toad and helps him escape by giving him a disguise. Toad hijacks an engine from a railway station and heads to the riverbank, where he hides in the Rat's house after escaping from the police. MacBadger visits to tell them that the weasel gang has taken over Toad Hall, with Winky as their leader, confirming that Toad had indeed traded his estate for the stolen car. To prove his innocence before the law, Toad, McBadger, Rat, and Mole sneak into the estate and narrowly manage to take the deed (bearing Toad and Winky's signatures) away from the weasels after a chase around Toad Hall.

Toad is exonerated and regains his house, but develops a mania for planes. As MacBadger, Rat, and Mole celebrate the New Year's Day, Toad and Cyril recklessly fly past on a Wright Flyer.

=== The Legend of Sleepy Hollow ===
In 1790, Ichabod Crane arrives in the small Tarrytown village of Sleepy Hollow to be the new schoolmaster. Due to his scarecrow-like appearance and highfalutin behavior, Ichabod becomes a target for Brom Bones, a rascally yet respected resident, but forms good relationships with his students and the village's women. Ichabod soon meets and falls in love with Katrina, the daughter of wealthy farmer Baltus Van Tassel, while also having one eye on her family's fortune. Brom, who intends to marry Katrina, proceeds to compete for her affection with the schoolmaster, but Ichabod wins Katrina over at every opportunity, with Katrina noticing Brom's increasing anger and jealousy.

Ichabod and Brom are invited to Van Tassel's annual Halloween frolic, where Brom tries in vain to keep Ichabod and Katrina separate. Discovering that Ichabod is superstitious, Brom tells the tale of the Headless Horseman who, every Halloween night, travels through the woods searching for a living head to replace the one he lost; the only way to escape him is to cross a covered bridge, at which point he will vanish. Katrina and all the guests find the story amusing, but Ichabod is left terrified.

That night, Ichabod rides his horse Gunpowder home through the Hollow where the Headless Horseman is said to appear; remembering the story, his fear and anxiety heighten and he is frightened by every sound he hears. Passing through the old European cemetery, Ichabod becomes convinced he can hear the sound of a galloping horse approaching, but bursts into laughter when it turns out to be cattails bumping on a log. His laughter is cut short when the real Headless Horseman appears, mounted on a fiery black horse and carrying a jack-o'-lantern and a sword. Ichabod and Gunpowder run off and, remembering Brom's story, ride towards a covered bridge with the Horseman in pursuit. They finally cross the bridge but as Ichabod looks back, the Horseman throws the jack-o'-lantern in his direction.

The next morning, Ichabod's hat and a shattered pumpkin are found near the bridge, but there was no trace of the schoolmaster. Subsequently, Brom marries Katrina, and rumors persist that Ichabod survived and married a wealthy widow in a distant county, though the Dutch settlers remain certain he was spirited away by the Headless Horseman. The ending of the story prompts the film's narrator to exclaim: "Man, I'm gettin' outta here."

== Voice cast ==
- Bing Crosby as the narrator of The Legend of Sleepy Hollow segment
- Basil Rathbone as the narrator of The Wind in the Willows segment
- Eric Blore as J. Thaddeus Toad, Esq., the boastful and volatile master of Toad Hall, who is prone to wild manias
- J. Pat O'Malley as Cyril Proudbottom, Toad's jolly and eccentric horse
- John McLeish (Note: Listed in the credits as John Ployardt.) as the District Attorney who prosecutes Toad's case at the trial
- Colin Campbell as Mole, Toad's devoted close friend
- Campbell Grant as Angus MacBadger, Toad's practical friend and accountant at Toad Hall
- Claud Allister as Water Rat, Toad's meticulous close friend
- The Rhythmaires as the title chorus

Both Oliver Wallace and Alec Harford are credited with voicing Mr. Winky, a sly and treacherous barman who takes advantage of Toad's motor mania to get Toad Hall. Wallace also provided Ichabod's whistle in the final chase scene, with the character's scream done by Pinto Colvig. Harford also voiced the postman and jailer in the Tower of London. Leslie Denison voiced the judge at Toad's trial. Edmond Stevens voiced the policeman. James Bodrero, Denison, Stevens, and McLeish provided the voices of the weasels, a gang of small-time crooks who are Winky's henchmen. Billy Bletcher voiced the evil laugh of the Headless Horseman.

== Production ==
=== Early development ===
I remember the Wind in the Willows stuff was on leica... It was about 47 minutes, as I recall, and the thing just sparkled. Everyone was so high on it. It was funny, and it was warm, and great characters, and gee, it just went. We said, there's our picture, and you put it into work, it's naturally going to expand to the hour 10, 15 [minutes] that you want—but it didn't. As you expanded it, it got soggy, and it got heavy, and it slowed up, and it lost all of that brightness that it had. Nobody knew why.

— Frank Thomas, on the early development of The Wind in the Willows as a single-narrative feature

Walt Disney was introduced to Kenneth Grahame's children's novel The Wind in the Willows (1908) in 1934, having received a copy from an English correspondent. Roy O. Disney acquired the rights to the novel during his European acquisition spree of properties for potential features in April 1938, but Walt was not interested, finding the story "awfully corny". After reading the book, story artist James Bodrero convinced him to put The Wind in the Willows into production, which was originally intended to be a single-narrative feature. The first story meetings were held by September 1940, with the film's production officially confirmed the following month. Disney commissioned Mel Shaw to create inspirational artwork, and James Algar was appointed to direct the film. Bodrero and fellow story artist Campbell Grant prepared the first storyboards and a Leica reel, which combined story sketches with rough dialogue performed by members of the animation staff. The animation work had begun by April 1941, as animators and writers had come off from Bambi, which was nearly complete. The project was put on hold the following month due to the Disney animators' strike, although Shaw (who was relatively indifferent to the politics of the situation) continued to work on the film before leaving the Disney studio that summer to found a new animation studio with Hugh Harman.

The Wind in the Willows was put back into production by October 1941, after the strike was settled. At the same time, Joseph Rosenberg of the Bank of America issued an ultimatum in which he would permit an absolute loan limit of $3.5 million. In return, he ordered the Disney studio to restrict itself to producing animation shorts and to finish features already in production (such as Dumbo and Bambi), but no other feature film would begin work until they had been released and earned back their costs. In response, most of the studio's feature film productions were heavily scaled, although The Wind in the Willows was kept in production as animation work had already begun. After reviewing the animation footage a few weeks later, Walt Disney decided to shelve the project, feeling that "the quality was too far below the standard necessary to be successful on the market." Over 3,000 feet of animation had been completed by that time. By January 1942, The Wind in the Willows was officially put on hold.

=== Return to production ===
We started out not co-directing as much as salvaging. Walt [Disney] said, "Let's see what we got there. Put it together, find out what shape it's in, re-shoot the scenes, whatever, and see what it looks like." So we did that, and then he looked at it and said, "It still doesn't hold up," but he had some new ideas of scenes to put in it, and he also wanted it cut down to thirty minutes. We cut it down to thirty minutes and he said, "It's still too long. Cut it down to twenty-five." So we cut out scenes which we really hated to cut out, some of the best ones ... I handed out a lot of scenes, and about that time I got pulled off it to work on Johnny Appleseed.

— Frank Thomas, on co-directing The Wind in the Willows with James Algar in 1946

The Wind in the Willows resumed production in October 1943, with Bodrero and Grant reattached and joined by Perce Pearce and Paul Gerard Smith. It was the only feature that Bank of America allowed to proceed during World War II, aside of Peter Pan. Around this same time, Walt Disney planned to combine The Wind in the Willows with either The Legend of Happy Valley (which would later evolve into the Mickey and the Beanstalk segment for Fun and Fancy Free) or The Gremlins (an original story developed for Disney by Roald Dahl) into a package film. His brother Roy disapproved this idea, calculating that the project would recoup its production costs only as a feature film. The Wind in the Willows underwent additional story treatment by February 1944, but in general, the film progressed slowly through production. After finishing his military service in World War II, Frank Thomas returned to the Disney studio in April 1946 and was assigned to direct additional footage (alongside James Algar) in hopes of salvaging the project. Under Disney's orders, the film was shortened down to a length of 25 minutes.

The Wind in the Willows was shelved again following layoffs in August 1946, with Bodrero and Grant leaving the studio, while Thomas went on to work on Johnny Appleseed segment for Melody Time. By October of that year, the film was put back into production, with Ward Kimball, Jack Kinney, Homer Brightman, and Harry Reeves brought in to work out the pace and add more gags to the story. In early 1947, Disney started production on an animated version of Washington Irving's short story "The Legend of Sleepy Hollow" (1820), which was to be co-directed by Kinney and Clyde Geronimi. Like The Wind in the Willows, it was originally intended to be a feature film. By November 1947, Disney decided to pair both productions into a singular package film, titled Two Fabulous Characters, as neither part was long enough to be a full-length feature. The project was scheduled to be released in late 1949 and was eventually renamed The Adventures of Ichabod and Mr. Toad.

=== Casting ===
Most of the voices for The Wind in the Willows segment were recorded in 1941, before the United States entered World War II. Claud Allister, who had just recorded as Sir Giles for The Reluctant Dragon, was cast as Water Rat. Walt Disney considered Eric Blore for the role of Mr. Toad as early as when the project was first announced. Blore completed his recording sessions in a few days, receiving about $1,000 per day. Story artist Campbell Grant provided the voice of Angus MacBadger for an early Leica reel and recorded the final dialogue for the character in 1946. The same reel featured John Dehner as the prosecuting attorney; he was replaced by John McLeish in the final film. Oliver Wallace, the film's music director, was cast as Mr. Winky, although several sources alternatively cite Alec Harford as the voice of the character.

Gracie Fields originally signed on to narrate and sing in The Wind in the Willows segment in July 1946, although Charles Laughton was sought to provide narration for the segment by February 1948. The following month, it was reported that Bing Crosby had signed on to narrate the Sleepy Hollow segment. Basil Rathbone eventually signed on to provide narration for The Wind in the Willows segment.

== Music ==
The Adventures of Ichabod and Mr. Toad

Studio album by Oliver Wallace
- Released: 1949
- Label: Disneyland Records

=== The Wind in the Willows ===
All lyrics are written by Larry Morey & Ray Gilbert; all music is composed by Frank Churchill & Charles Wolcott.

No.	Title	Performer(s)	Length
1.	"The Merrily Song"	Eric Blore & J. Pat O'Malley
2.	"Auld Lang Syne"	Chorus

=== The Legend of Sleepy Hollow ===
All tracks are written by Don Raye & Gene de Paul.

No.	Title	Performer(s)	Length
1.	"Ichabod Crane"	Bing Crosby & Jud Conlon's Rhythmaires
2.	"Katrina"	Bing Crosby & Jud Conlon's Rhythmaires
3.	"The Headless Horseman"	Bing Crosby & Jud Conlon's Rhythmaires

== Release ==
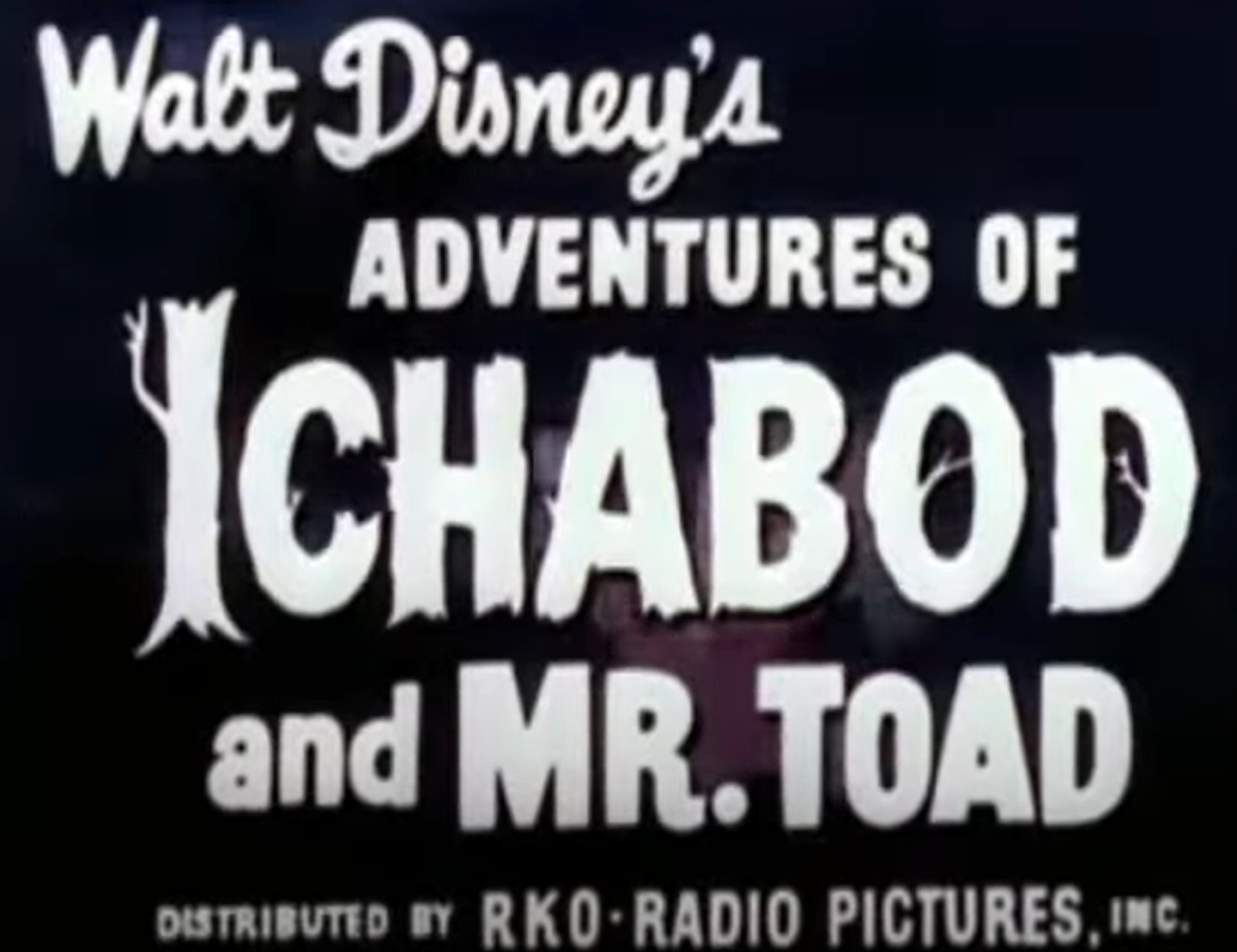
Title card from the original 1949 trailer

The Adventures of Ichabod and Mr. Toad was released in theaters on October 5, 1949. The film grossed $1,200,000 in domestic rentals in the United States and Canada. Cumulatively, it earned $1,625,000 in worldwide rentals.

=== Television airings ===
The Mr. Toad segment of The Adventures of Ichabod and Mr. Toad was first screened on television, in edited form, as part of the inaugural season of the Disneyland anthology series, on February 2, 1955, under the title The Wind in the Willows. It was paired with an edited version of Disney's The Reluctant Dragon due to the fact that both cartoons are based on stories by author Kenneth Grahame. The Ichabod segment of the film had its television premiere during the following season of TV's Disneyland, on October 26, 1955, under the title The Legend of Sleepy Hollow. Notably, for this airing of Sleepy Hollow and subsequent reruns, a new 14-minute animated prologue was added, recounting the life of Washington Irving, the story's author. This prologue has never been released on home media.

The Legend of Sleepy Hollow was released on its own to theaters as a 33-minute featurette in September 1963. This was the same edit presented on the Disneyland television series, minus the 14-minute prologue and the Walt Disney live-action host segments. Similarly, in 1978, the Wind in the Willows segment of the original film was re-released to theaters under the new title The Madcap Adventures of Mr. Toad to accompany Disney's feature film Hot Lead and Cold Feet.

The Legend of Sleepy Hollow had a subsequent television airing, in truncated form, as part of the TV specials Halloween Hall o' Fame (1977) and Disney's Halloween Treat (1982).

Once it was split into two segments for airing on the Disneyland television series, The Adventures of Ichabod and Mr. Toad was not available for viewing in its original form for many years thereafter, but was instead screened as two individual items. When first released on home video, the segments retained their names from the Disneyland series (The Legend of Sleepy Hollow and The Wind in the Willows, respectively), having taken their names from the original stories.

Some of the scenes were cut when the segments were split up for home video release. For example:

- The Wind in the Willows
  - Part of the introduction was cut because of the new music added. As a side effect, most of the original audio for the introduction was synced incorrectly.
  - The scene where Angus MacBadger confronts the angry townspeople who are suing Toad.
  - The newspaper scene regarding Toad's disgrace was shortened by removing the newspaper articles of his friends' attempts to reopen his case.
  - When Toad realizes he is underwater after unknowingly jumping into a river to elude the police pursuing him, there is a brief full-body scene of Toad frantically trying to pull out the ball-and-chain he is shackled to out of the floor of the river.
- The Legend of Sleepy Hollow
  - The only thing that was cut was the introduction in the bookcases.

=== Home media ===
The Adventures of Ichabod and Mr. Toad received its first complete home video release in the UK in 1991 and in the US in 1992, when it was released by Walt Disney Home Video on VHS and LaserDisc. A subsequent complete release on VHS followed in 1999 as the last title in the Walt Disney Masterpiece Collection line. In 2000, it appeared on DVD for the first time as part of the Walt Disney Gold Classic Collection line.

The 1963 theatrical version of The Legend of Sleepy Hollow was released on VHS in 1982, 1990, and 1994. The 1978 theatrical version of The Wind in the Willows was released on VHS in March 1983, 1988, and 1996. This same version of The Wind in the Willows was issued on DVD for the first time in 2009, as part of the fifth volume of the Walt Disney Animation Collection: Classic Short Films series. Both had been released to video separately in the US in the early 1980s as white clamshell releases even though Fun and Fancy Free had been released in its entirety around the same time.

The Adventures of Ichabod and Mr. Toad was released on Blu-ray, DVD, Digital HD and in a two-film collection with Fun and Fancy Free on August 12, 2014. It was also released as solely on Blu-ray, DVD and digital copy combo and a stand-alone DVD exclusively to Walmart stores.

The film was available to stream on Disney+ when the service launched on November 12, 2019.

== Reception ==
=== Critical response ===
A. H. Weiler of The New York Times praised the film, saying that "Mr. Disney, abetted by his staff, such perfect narrators as Bing Crosby and Basil Rathbone, and a pair of durable literary works, has fashioned a conclave of cartoon creatures, which, by and large, have the winsome qualities and charm of such noted creations as Mickey Mouse, Dumbo, et al." Herman Schoenfeld of Variety felt the film "ranks among the best full-length cartoons turned out by the Walt Disney studios." On The Wind in the Willows, he commented that it "has a subtle, satirical edge on its comedy which will limit its appreciation to adult audiences. The Irving legend, however, is treated with splashes of color and broad strokes of humor and violence that will appeal in a fundamental way to all age groups. Together they comprise a solid package of varied entertainment."

A review in Life magazine felt Disney's adaptation of The Wind in the Willows "leaves out the poetry and most of the subtlety, but it still has enough action for the children and wit enough for everybody. It is deft and pleasant, and throughout, ironic and goodhearted. Although the Ichabod part of Ichabod and Mr. Toad is silly and bumbling, Mr. Toad's half is good enough to convince Disney admirers that the old master can still display the bounce and vitality he had before the war." A review in Time magazine felt the film was "an uneven doubleheader by Walt Disney, who has combined into one film two dissimilar literary classics." However, they particularly praised The Wind in the Willows, writing, "This lighthearted, fast-moving romp has inspired some of Disney's most inventive draftsmanship and satire." They were less receptive to Sleepy Hollow, writing it was "Disney at his facile best. The rest of the story, dealing with quaint, legendary people, is flat and prosaic."

Leonard Maltin, writing in his book The Disney Films, wrote that the film was "one of Disney's most beguiling animated features: The Wind in the Willows in particular has some of the finest work the studio ever did." Altogether, he claimed "these sequences form a most engaging feature, with as the saying goes, something for everyone. The half-hour length seems ideal for each of the stories, with neither a feeling of abruptness, nor a hint of padding to reach that length. And somehow the two tales seem to complement each other quite well, providing an interesting contrast, notable in style and execution, and more obviously in the change of narrator." M. Faust of Common Sense Media gave the film five complete stars writing, "Two classic stories told in the best Disney style." On the review aggregator website Rotten Tomatoes, The Adventures of Ichabod and Mr. Toad has an approval rating of 89%, based on 18 reviews, with an average score of 7.4/10. Its consensus states "This Disney two-fer may not be the most reverent literary adaptation, but it's remarkably crafted and emotionally resonant." On Metacritic, the film has a weighted average score of 74 out of 100, based on 5 critics, indicating "generally favorable reviews".

=== Accolades ===
The film won the Golden Globe Award for Best Cinematography – Color.

== Legacy ==
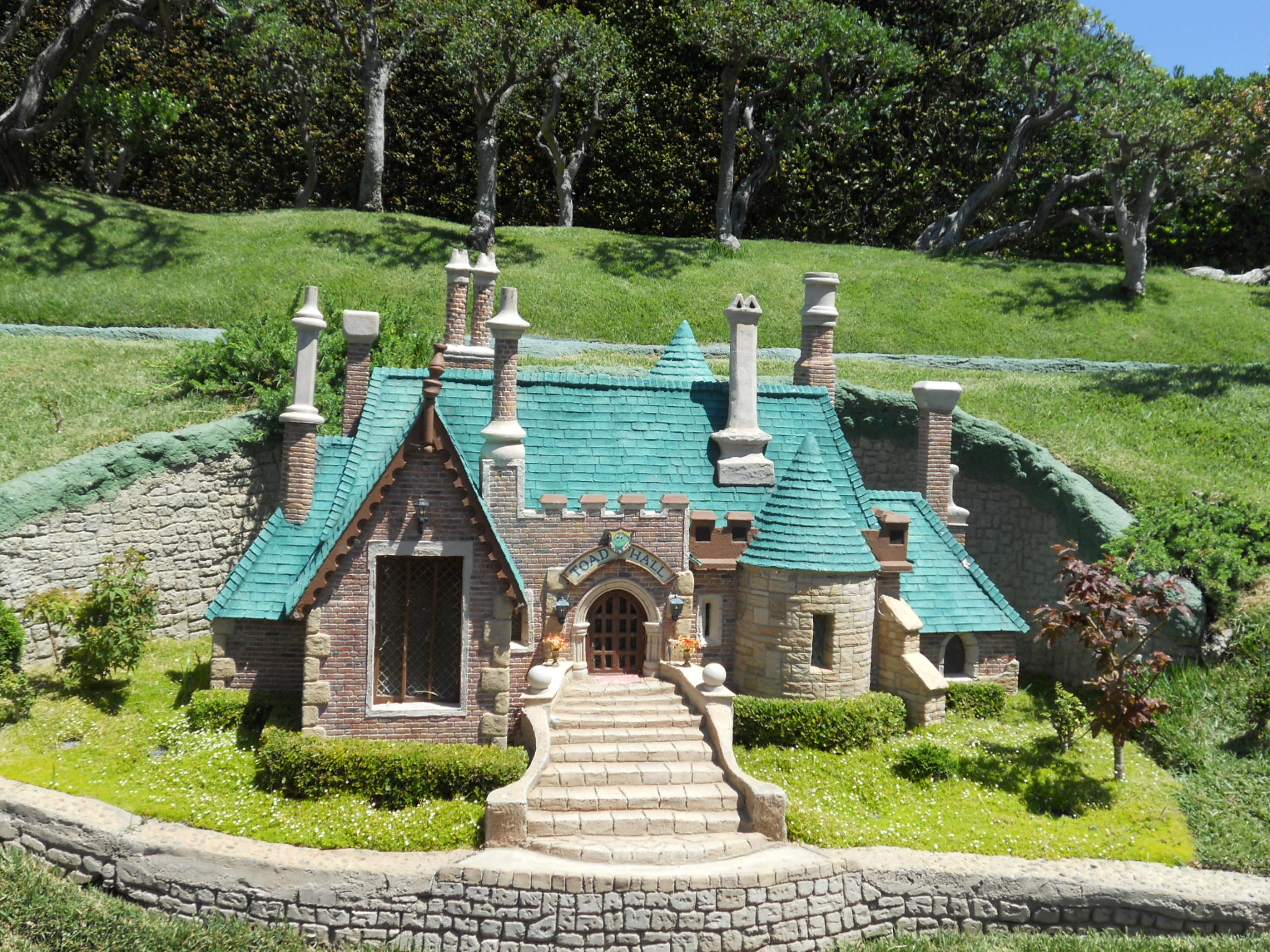
Toad Hall at Storybook Land Canal Boats attraction in Disneyland.

The film has a presence at some of the Disney Parks and Resorts mainly through rides and restaurants. There is a Sleepy Hollow refreshments café themed to The Legend of Sleepy Hollow in Liberty Square at the Magic Kingdom, whilst the story of The Wind in the Willows is present at Toad Hall Restaurant located in Fantasyland at Disneyland Paris. At the Disneyland Resort, Mr. Toad's Wild Ride in Fantasyland at Disneyland Park is themed after Mr. Toad, while the Frightfully Fun Parade during Oogie Boogie Bash features the Headless Horseman at Disney California Adventure Park. The Headless Horseman is also featured in a pre-parade ride during Mickey's Not-So-Scary Halloween Party at the Magic Kingdom in Walt Disney World.

The Wind in the Willows is also represented in later Disney media, with occasional appearances made by Toad, Moley, Ratty, MacBadger and the Weasels, notably in Mickey's Christmas Carol (1983).

== See also ==
- 1949 in film
- List of films set around Halloween
- List of American films of 1949
- List of Walt Disney Pictures films
- List of Disney theatrical animated feature films
- List of animated feature films of the 1940s
- List of highest-grossing animated films
- List of animated package films
- Mr. Toad's Wild Ride

== Bibliography ==
- Barrier, Michael (1999). Hollywood Cartoons: American Animation in Its Golden Age. Oxford University Press. ISBN 978-0-19-802079-0.
- Barrier, Michael (2007). The Animated Man: A Life of Walt Disney. University of California Press. ISBN 978-0-5202-5619-4.
- Gabler, Neal (2006). Walt Disney: The Triumph of the American Imagination. Vintage Books. ISBN 978-0-6797-5747-4.
- Canemaker, John (2001). Walt Disney's Nine Old Men and the Art of Animation. Disney Editions. ISBN 978-0-7868-6496-6.
- Ghez, Didier (2012). Walt's People: Talking Disney with the Artists who Knew Him – Volume 12. Xlibris US. ISBN 978-1-4771-4790-0.
- Ghez, Didier (2017). They Drew As they Pleased: The Hidden Art of Disney's Late Golden Age (The 1940s - Part Two). Chronicle Books LLC. ISBN 978-1-4521-6407-6.
- Ghez, Didier (2019). They Drew as They Pleased Vol 5: The Hidden Art of Disney's Early Renaissance. Chronicle Books LLC. ISBN 978-1-7972-0410-9.
- Koenig, David (1997). Mouse Under Glass: Secrets of Disney Animation & Theme Parks. Bonaventure Press. ISBN 978-0-9640-6051-7.
- Maltin, Leonard (1995). The Disney Films. Disney Editions. ISBN 978-0-7868-8527-5.
- Scott, Kevin (2022). Cartoon Voices of the Golden Age, 1930-70 Vol. 1. BearManor Media. ISBN 979-8-88-771008-2.
- Smith, Dave (1996). Disney A to Z: The Official Encyclopedia. Disney Editions. ISBN 978-0-7868-6223-8.
- Thomas, Frank; Johnston, Ollie (1993). The Disney Villain. Disney Editions. ISBN 978-1-5628-2792-2.
- Webb, Graham (2011). The Animated Film Encyclopedia: A Complete Guide to American Shorts, Features and Sequences, 1900-1999. McFarland & Company. ISBN 978-0-7864-4985-9.
