= Esbjerg Sløjdhøjskole =

Coordinates: 55.4883°N 8.4890°E

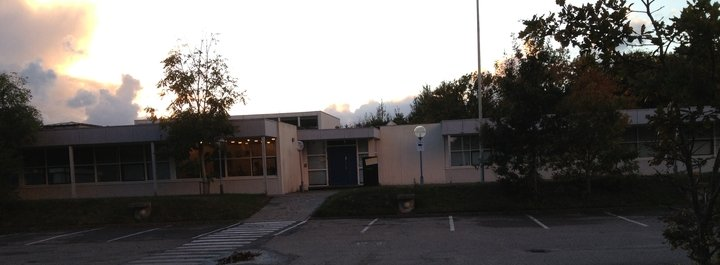

Location
- Esbjerg; Denmark

Information
- Former name: Askov Sløjdskole
- School type: Folk high school
- Established: 1886

Esbjerg Sløjdhøjskole, previously known as Askov Sløjdlærerskole, is a folk high school in Esbjerg, Denmark which teaches handicrafts under the principles of sloyd. The school has been integrated into University College South Denmark.

== Askov Sløjdlærerskole ==
Askov Sløjdlærerskole, also known as Askov Sløjdskole, was founded by Søren Larsen Meldgaard in 1886 with the encouragement of the principal of Askov Højskole, Ludvig Schrøder. Meldgaard bought a plot of land and erected the first two buildings with his own resources.

The school was originally named Husflids- og Sløjdskolen i Askov. Handicrafts and sloyd were both taught in the summer, and in the winter the school functioned as a boys efterskole. The handicraft and sloyd schools later separated, forming Askov Sløjdlærerskole and Askov Husflidsskole.

While studying at Nääs in Sweden in the 1880s, Meldgaard had learned a system for handicraft education called Nääs-sloyd from the craftsman Otto Salomon. The school in Askov borrowed from this system's method of "exercise sequences", where a student produced models in increasing difficulty and were not allowed to move on until they had perfected the technique. For a number of years, the system of sloyd used at Askov was referred to as the Askov-Nääs System, because of the similarities it bore to the original Swedish system. In time, the school's unique system was referred to simply as Askov-sloyd.

During the first few decades, the school held many courses for young people who did not complete their sloyd exams (sløjdlærereksamen). In 1953 Askov Sløjdlærerskole became an independent institution with Aksel Sørensen as its first chairman.

In 1974 the school moved to Esbjerg, and in 1975 reopened as the Sløjdhøjskolen Esbjerg. The original school's old gymnasium in Askov has been used as an amateur theatre since 1991 and is named Sløjdscenen after the school.

== Directors ==
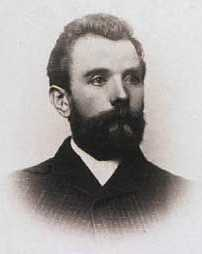
Søren Meldgaard

- 1886-1894 Søren Larsen Meldgaard (1850-1894)
- 1895-1908 Jørgen Rasmussen Kirkebjerg (1859–1929)
- 1908-1938 Anders Nielsen (1864-1950)
- 1938-1964 Poul Vynne (1906-1971)
- 1964-1972 Kurt Bay-Petersen (1935- )
- 1972-1993 Johannes Sole Pedersen (1930-2018)
- 1993-2009 Gert Broge (1949- )
