= Agda Meyerson =

Swedish nurse and activist

- Born: Agda Sofia Meyerson; 1 February 1866; Stockholm, Sweden
- Died: 27 December 1924 (aged 58); Stockholm, Sweden
- Occupation: Nurse
- Years active: 1898–1924
- Known for: Pioneering the nursing profession in Sweden

Agda Meyerson (1 February 1866 – 27 December 1924) was a Swedish nurse who became an activist to improve the education, pay and working conditions of her profession. She served as vice chair of the Swedish Nursing Association in 1910 and on the board of numerous nursing facilities. She is recognized as one of the pioneers of the profession in Sweden.

== Early life ==
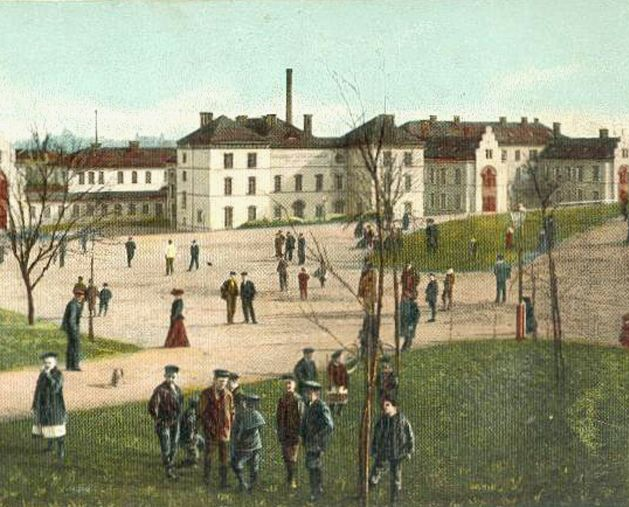
Crown Princess Lovisa Children's Hospital

Agda Sofia Meyerson was born as a twin with Gerda Meyerson on 1 February 1866 in Stockholm, Sweden to Betty (née Hirsch) and Herman August Meyerson. Her parents were Swedish Jews and belonged to the Mosaic Assembly. Her mother had been educated and though she participated in the mikveh before marriage, she did not shave her head. Herman was a wholesaler, who later worked as the Assistant Director of the Scandinavian Bank. Her paternal grandfather, Lesser Meyerson (also Meijerson) was a manufacturer and leader in the Mosaic community. Her maternal grandparents, Simon and Thèrése (née Suber) Hirsch were of German and French heritage and also operated a factory.

The twins were the only daughters in the family, with two older brothers and one younger brother. The children were born in their grandfather Meyerson's home and moved several times to various locations around the city. The girls attended the Åhlin Girls' School until 1882. Meyerson then attended the lecture courses of Otto Salomon to learn handicrafts and practical knowledge, before entering nurse's training in 1896 at Sabbatsberg Hospital. Without graduating, she then studied child care at the Crown Princess Lovisa Children's Hospital and Samaritan Children's Hospital.

== Career ==
After completion of her training, in 1897, Mayerson joined the Swedish Red Cross and then from 1898 to 1907 she worked as an overseer at the Bernhardt Hospital. In 1906, her mother died and Meyerson used her inheritance to purchase a five-story stone house at #56 Brahegatan, which was used as a nursing facility with a three-room apartment, which she and Gerda shared. She directed the operations at this nursing facility until 1917. It is unclear whether she paid herself a salary, or whether she provided her services free of charge at Sister Agdas Nursing Home. In 1910 the Swedish Nursing Association was founded and Meyerson was elected as its first deputy chairman. Between 1911 and 1922, she coordinated classes for nurses training from throughout the Nordic countries and served as a lecturer, as well as the organizer of the communications and accommodations for the participants in the courses. The weekly courses typically had over 200 participants and were both continuing education classes and practical skills practices. Assisting in the presentations were Dr. Ada Nilsson, who taught about women's diseases and Meyerson's twin, Gerda, who discussed social aspects.

In 1912, Meyerson made a six-week investigative trip through Denmark, eastern Germany, and Finland for the government to evaluate education and working conditions of women who were working in the healthcare industry. She worked as secretary of the team for this comparative study from 1912 to 1916. The analysis also included information on the conditions and licensing requirements in Austria, England, Norway, the United States and western Germany. Between 1916 and 1918, Meyerson also worked with a team of doctors, nurses and politicians to evaluate working conditions for district nurses. Because there were no requirements for nursing education, Meyerson pressed for standards to be established for nursing schools and urged that they come under the regulating authority of the Medical Board. During World War I she helped develop a network of nurses who cared for 120 German nurses recuperating from fatigue or illness, who had been housed with various Swedish families by the Swedish Nursing Association.

Between 1917 and 1924, Meyerson was the director of the nursing facility operated by the Swedish Nursing Association. In 1920, based largely upon the proposals made by the committee reviewing nursing conditions, the Riksdag passed legislation to establish nursing inspectors and conduct surveys on standardization. In 1921, she made another trip traveling through Germany, Italy, and Switzerland. She published an article in Travel Impressions on the educational requirements and hospital facilities she encountered on her trip. Over the course of her career, Meyerson published approximately thirty articles in Sjukskötersketidningen (Nursing Magazine), primarily having to do with increasing the competency and professionalism for nurses throughout Sweden. She was also instrumental in pressing for provisions to care for retired nurses.

== Death and legacy ==
Meyerson died on 27 December 1924 at her home in Stockholm. She left a legacy to the Israeli Sickness and Funeral Society. She is remembered as the first vice-chair of the Swedish Nursing Association when it was formed in 1910. She was the driving force in providing for the social needs of patients in nursing facilities and concerned with the fate of retired nurses, proposing the Comrade Fund, to support aging nurses. The fund currently provides assistance for medical, eye or dental care.
