= Design education =

Design education is the teaching of theory and application in the design of products, services, and environments, and focuses on the development of both particular and general skills for designing, preparing students for professional practice. It is primarily oriented to preparing higher education students for professional design practice, and based around project work and studio or atelier teaching methods, while general education uses design methods to improve materials for teachers and students.

== History ==
Design education’s origins can be seen as far back as the 18th century despite not being referred to as such until the 1970s. Despite the contrast between the Arts and Sciences, the use of design principles to scientific matters would theoretically allow for scientific and mathematical subjects to be approached practically without taking away from the subject matter itself. Research into the usage of design methodology in various fields would see its incorporation into general education as methods for teaching and a subject to be taught.

=== Early implementations ===
Johann Heinrich Pestalozzi was regarded as the “father of manual training”, in regards to his beliefs that manual work and general education would provide a better foundation than just a one sided education. Pestalozzi also believed in adherence to the structure of the senses and their usage in obtaining and processing knowledge, which he believed children should do to gain a well rounded sense of the world.

Friedrich Fröbel would implement Pestalozzi’s ideals in a known vocational way, as he would go on to found the Kindergarten as an educational institution. His approach to Pestalozzi’s methodology would be from his own religious and practical point of view, where he sought to assist in the development of early age children, who believed to be inherently create and best express themselves through action. Fröbel’s concept Kindergarten persists as both an institution and a set of ideals.

Uno Cygnaeus would develop the Sloyd Pedagogy in response to research done on the principles of Fröbel and Pestalozzi. The system would regard each student as an individual that would be taught woodcraft in relation their general education. Otto Salomon and Aksel Mikkelsen would implement these systems in Sweden and Denmark respectively, with Mikkelsen and Salomon training teachers from various nations to teach Sloyd in their home countries.

=== Modern implementation ===
L. Bruce Archer was a researcher and professor at the Royal College of Art who would become recognized for his designs. Archer’s utilization of systematic methods, in regards to industrial design, would coincide with his belief that design is a third pillar education. His tenure at the Royal College of Art would see him and his team being converted into the Department of Design Research, where they were able to take contract work researching, developing and implementing designs. In 1971 the Department would pivot from strictly research to formally educating postgraduate students in design research. Archer’s advocacy to the Department for Education and Science for the inclusion of design education principles would see it added throughout the school's curriculum. Use of design in education at the higher level would eventually lead to the curriculum being adopted across the United Kingdom. In his lifetime Arthur would commit to his belief that a “designerly” way of approaching scholarly and scientific subjects exists, that is both unique and as powerful when compared to current academia.

There are also broader forms of higher education in design studies and design thinking, and design also features as a part of general education, for example within Design and Technology and Engineering Technology.

== Research ==
For more information see: Design research

Various methods of design education would be up to debate and discussion, International Conference on Design and Technology Research (IDATER) was one forum for this purpose which ran from 1988 to 2001. The purpose of these conferences was to create a standard for studying and analyzing the curriculum for design and technology that was beginning to emerge in England with the onset of the 1990s.

== Institutions ==
Institutions for design education date back to the nineteenth century. The Norwegian National Academy of Craft and Art Industry was founded in 1818, followed by the United Kingdom's Government School of Design (1837), Konstfack in Sweden (1844), and Rhode Island School of Design in the United States (1877). The German art and design school Bauhaus, founded in 1919, greatly influenced modern design education.

In 1970, in Japan, South Korea, and Singapore there were no design schools. However, as of the early 2000s there are more than 23 design schools within the three Asia countries.

== See also ==
- Design
- STEAM fields

== Other sources ==
- Salama, Ashraf M. A., and Nicholas Wilkinson. 2007. Design studio pedagogy: Horizons for the future. Gateshead, U.K.: Urban International Press.
- Michl, Jan. 2006. "A case against the modernist regime in design education"
- Wang, Tsungjuang. 2010. "A New Paradigm for Design Studio Education." International Journal of Art & Design Education.
