= Art Institute of Pittsburgh =

Private college in the United States

The Art Institute of Pittsburgh
- Motto: The College for Creative Minds
- Type: (1921–2017) For-profit art school (2017–2019) Nonprofit art school
- Active: 1921–2019
- Location: Pittsburgh, Pennsylvania, United States
- Campus: Urban

The Art Institute of Pittsburgh was a private art college in Pittsburgh, Pennsylvania. The school emphasized design education and career preparation for the creative job market. It was founded in 1921 and closed in 2019.

The Art Institute of Pittsburgh was part of The Art Institutes, a private for-profit system of art schools in the United States, which closed down in September 2023.

== History ==
Founded in 1921, the school began as a profit-based independent school of art and illustration, producing a number of notable artists including watercolorist Frank Webb, animation producer and director Rick Schneider-Calabash, and the late science fiction illustrator Frank Kelly Freas.

Later, the institute specialized primarily in design disciplines and culinary arts.

=== Sale to EDMC ===
In 1968, the Pittsburgh-based Education Management Corporation (EDMC) acquired the Art Institute of Pittsburgh, later creating additional schools in The Art Institutes system.

Enrollment in the online division and EDMC's other online programs ballooned from 7,900 in 2007 to 42,300 in 2012, largely due to practices that devoted more per-student expenditures to marketing ($4,158) than on education ($3,460). In 2008, the Art Institute of Pittsburgh briefly became one of the largest arts colleges in the United States (factoring in online enrollment).

In 2009, EDMC had an initial public offering, with Goldman Sachs assuming a majority position. Emphasis throughout the EDMC system shifted increasingly toward shareholder profits with cost-cutting measures resulting in larger classes, fewer student services, and a standardized curriculum throughout the system. This standardization removed the need for resident experts and curriculum developers at the individual colleges.

In 2010 enrollment began to drop, in part due to the falsification of records. Whistleblowers within the company sued the institute due to practices at the online division, and were later joined by the United States Department of Justice. Dramatic drops in enrollment led to massive layoffs in the online division.

In 2013, Payscale.com found that the institute provided the worst return on tuition of all institutes of higher learning surveyed. According to disclosures the college was required to provide to the Department of Education, overall graduation rates fell to 39% in 2012, while graduation rates among Pell Grant recipients were still lower at 27%. The graduation rate fell substantially further in 2014 from 39% to 24%.

New owners took control of EDMC in 2015, as EDMC entered into a debt-for-equity swap with its current owners, giving up the majority of their stock to creditors with whom they broke loan covenants.

=== Sale to the Dream Center ===
In 2017, Education Management Corporation reported that it had sold the Art Institute of Pittsburgh and the other existing Art Institutes to Dream Center Education Holdings (in turn a division of The Dream Center, a Los Angeles-based Pentecostal non-profit 501(c)(3) established in 1994). The sale was completed in October 2017.

According to a 2018 report by the National Center for Education Statistics, the Art Institute of Pittsburgh had a 29 percent graduation rate and a 20.9 percent student loan default rate.

Dream Center would later blame EDMC for providing inaccurate revenue and cost projections at the time of the sale, resulting in a substantial operating deficit that forced the Art Institute into federal receivership in January 2019.

=== Closure ===
After the collapse of a last-ditch effort to sell the school, the Art Institute of Pittsburgh shut its doors in March 2019 after being placed into federal receivership. At the time of its closure, Ai-Pittsburgh was facing removal of its accreditation by the Middle States Commission on Higher Education (MSCHE) due to concerns over the executive leadership.

== Location ==
The original location was in an industrial building in the Strip District. The school moved locations six times over the following decades into larger facilities with a broader curriculum. The school purchased a historic landmark building at 420 Boulevard of the Allies in 2000 but sold it to a Chicago developer in 2014.

On March 27, 2017, The school moved to 1400 Penn Avenue in Pittsburgh. During its growth phase, it relocated several times, expanding and broadening the curriculum, but later reduced offerings during its contraction period.

== The Art Institute of Pittsburgh – Online Division ==
The Art Institute of Pittsburgh's online division was a semi-autonomous division of the Art Institute. It offered degree programs and non-degree diploma courses in a variety of creative fields. The online division was shut down alongside the Strip campus location.

== Licensing, accreditation and memberships ==
The Art Institute of Pittsburgh was accredited by the Middle States Commission on Higher Education (since 2008).

== Notable alumni ==
The Art Institute of Pittsburgh has more than 55,000 alumni.

- Matt Bors, a nationally syndicated American editorial cartoonist and editor of online comics publication, The Nib.
- Shane Callahan, an American film and television actor.
- Stig Asmussen, an American video game developer and designer
- Julian Michael Carver, American sci-fi and horror novelist, author of one Primeval: New World novel.
- Frank Kelly Freas, an American science fiction and fantasy artist with a career spanning more than 50 years. He was known as the "Dean of Science Fiction Artists" and he was the second artist inducted into the Science Fiction Hall of Fame.
- Paul Gulacy, an American comics artist who worked for both DC and Marvel Comics. He is best known for drawing one of the first graphic novels, Eclipse Enterprises 1978 Sabre: Slow Fade of an Endangered Species, with writer Don McGregor.
- Leon Levinstein, an American street photographer best known for his work documenting everyday street life in New York City from the 1950s through the 1980s.
- Garrett Mason, an American Republican politician.
- J. Howard Miller (1939), an American graphic artist who painted posters during World War II in support of the war effort, among them the famous "We Can Do It!" poster, frequently misidentified as Rosie the Riveter.
- John Prentice, an American cartoonist and comic-book artist most widely known for his work on the syndicated comic strip Rip Kirby.
- Martha Rial, an independent photographer based in Pittsburgh. 1998 Pulitzer Prize winner for Spot News Photography, for her photographs of Rwandan and Burundian refugees.
- Jennifer M. Smith, former Premier of Bermuda 1998–2003; the first premier who was not a member of the United Bermuda Party.
- Roman Verostko (diploma in illustration, 1949), an American artist and educator who created code-generated imagery, known as algorithmic art.
- Frank Webb (1946), an American watercolor painter.
- Tom Wilson (1955), American cartoonist and creator of the Ziggy comic strip.
- Rick Schneider-Calabash, award-winning animation producer, writer, director for Walt Disney Studios.
