= Toppelius =

Toppelius is a Finnish-language surname. Notable people with the surname include:

- Mikael Toppelius (1734–1821), Finnish painter
- Meri Toppelius (1863–1896), Finnish-born American educational theorist

== See also ==
- Topelius (surname)
