= Askov Højskole =

Danish folk high school

Coordinates: 55°28′14″N 9°05′57″E

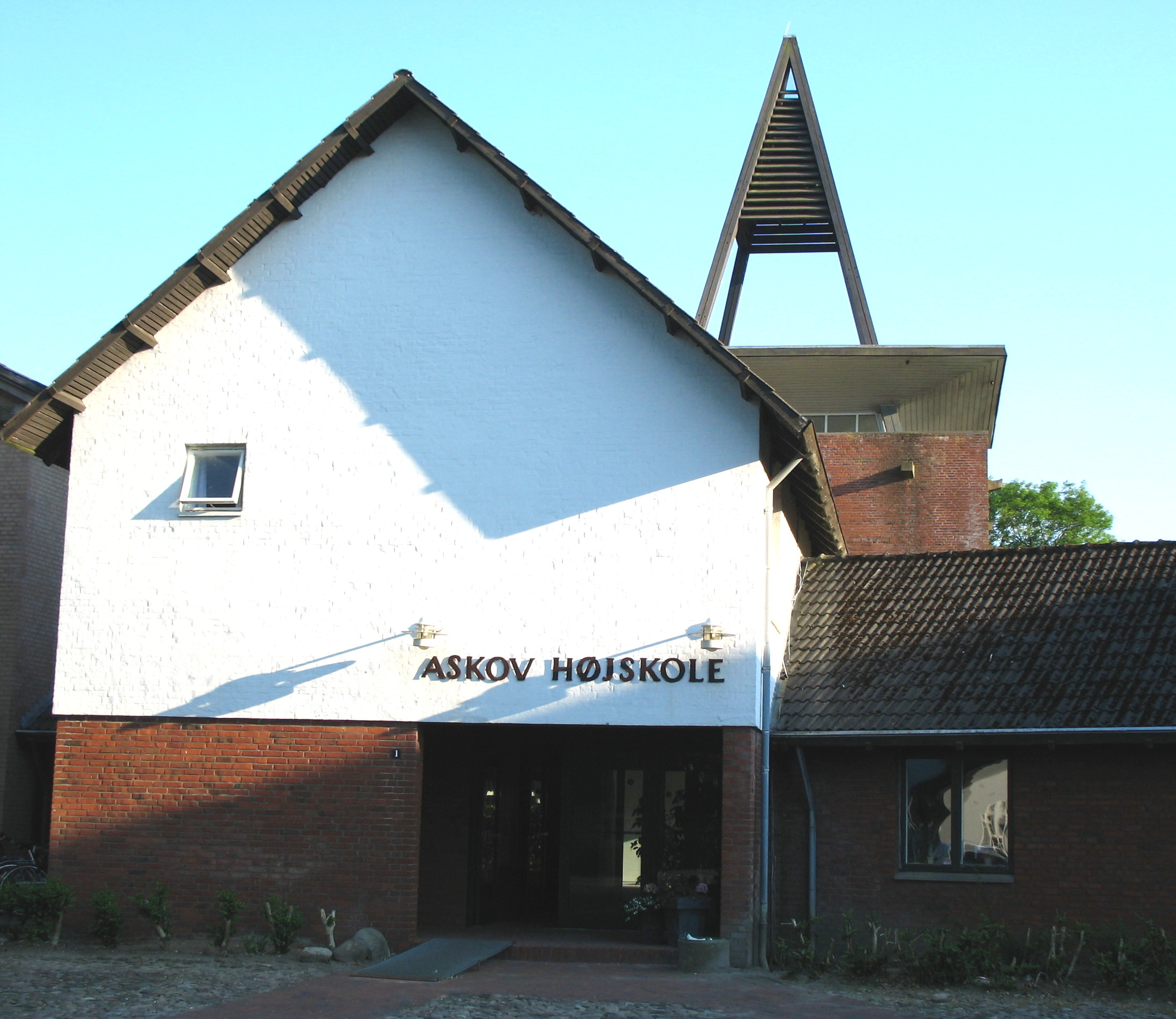
- Askov Højskole in 2007
- Type: folk high school
- Established: 1865
- Principal: Rikke Holm
- Location: Askov, Denmark
- Website: www.askov-hojskole.dk

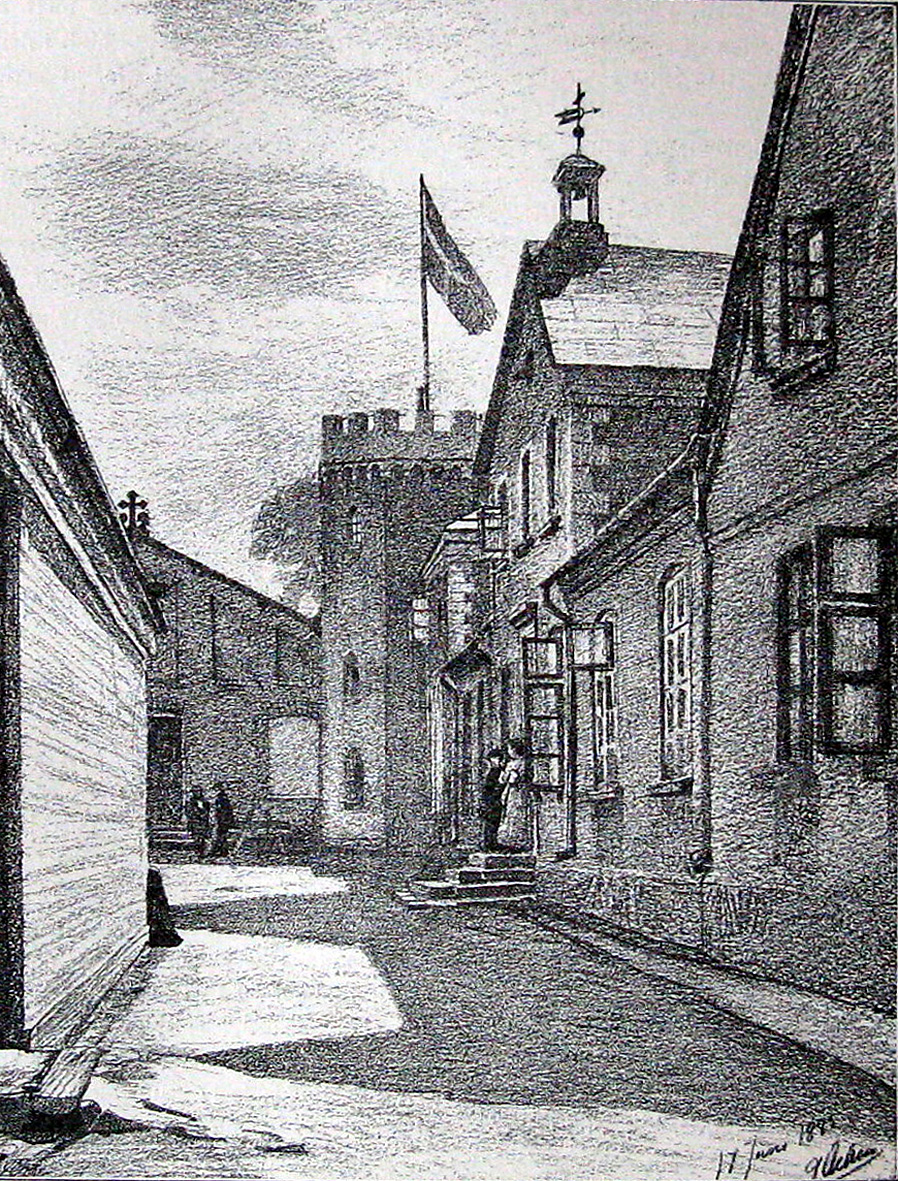
Askov Højskole in 1885

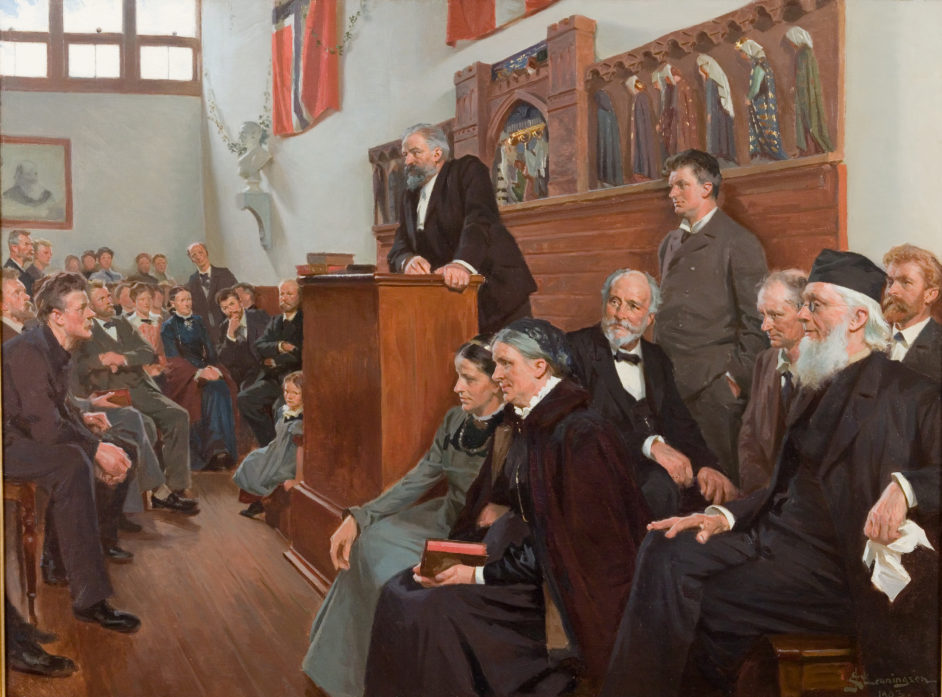
Askov Højskole, Erik Henningsen, 1903. Ribe Kunstmuseum

Askov Højskole is a Danish folk high school, that is located in the village of Askov in southern Jutland between Kolding and Esbjerg. It was founded in 1865 as an extension of Denmark's first folk high school, which had been established in 1844 in Rødding by Christian Flor. The first principal of Askov Højskole was Ludvig Schrøder.

== History ==
After 1864, a group of teachers, along with Ludvig Schrøder as their director, wanted to continue their work north of the border. Askov became known for its introduction of the "extended" højskole in 1878, which had longer terms. A number of extended subjects were offered, which were primarily intended for students (both male and female) who had previously attended other folk high schools. The school attracted highly qualified teachers such as the physicist and inventor Poul la Cour, whose windturbine experiment had been groundbreaking at the time. In La Cour altered the traditional view of the schools natural science program and laid the foundation for a new natural science tradition, which was continued by later principals Jacob Appel and J. Th. Arnfred, among others.

Since its establishment, Askov Højskole has been regarded as a "flagship" for other folk high schools and a "stronghold" of Grundtvig's original theory. The school's focus has remained both on life enlightenment, which is related to the conditions of existence, and on popular enlightenment which answers society's most important questions. As a natural consequence of this objective, the school has, like other grundtvigian folk highschools, had a great impact on its student personal development and their understanding of self, in addition to a deeper understand of democracy and its nature. Initially, most of the students at Askov Højskole came from the lower class, though eventually students from other walks of life also enrolled.

In the mid 1880s, the principal at the time, Schrøder, encouraged Søren Larsen Meldgaard to establish Askov Sløjdlærerskole, next to the folk high school. Askov Sløjdskolen operated as an efterskole for many years. Today, the school's old buildings are used as a theatre.

Askov højskole was affected by the youth rebellion of the late 1960s in Denmark. In 1972, a group of teachers, including Ebbe Kløvedal Reich, left the school because they were displeased with its principals and advocated for modernized teaching. As a result, Kolding Højskole was established, which was initially based on a Marxist foundation. Kolding Højskole was forced to close in the mid 1990s because of poor finances.

In addition to the longer courses, Askov arranges a series of shorter courses, especially in the summer months. The school has also functioned as a physical space for community meetings and has been a gathering place for a number of important initiatives of both political and cultural significance. In 2001, Askov Efterskole merged with the Højskole, and became a department of Askov Højskole and Efterskole. Askov Efterskole is an academic efterskole for students in the 9th and 10th grades and offers programs in theatre, design, music and media.

== Principals ==
- 1865–1906 Ludvig Schrøder
- 1906–1928 Jacob Appel, together with his wife Ingeborg
- 1928–1953 J. Th. Arnfred
- 1953–1968 Knud Hansen
- 1968–1970 H. Engberg-Pedersen
- 1970–1971 Knud Hansen
- 1971–1980 Helge Skov
- 1980–1993 Hans Henningsen
- 1993–1998 Morten Kvist
- 1998–2006 Henning Dochweiler
- 2006–2007 Hans Rosenquist
- 2007–2008 Bjarne Bundsgaard Nielsen
- 2008–2013 Ole Kobbelgaard
- 2013, Bjarne Bundsgaard Nielsen
- 2013–2016 Jørgen Kløve
- 2016, Bjarne Bundsgaard Nielsen
- 2017–2018 Klaus Majgaard
- 2018–present Rikke Holm
