= Topelius =

Topelius may refer to:

- Topelius, Minnesota
- Topelius (surname)
