= Ingeborg Appel =

Danish educator (1869–1948)

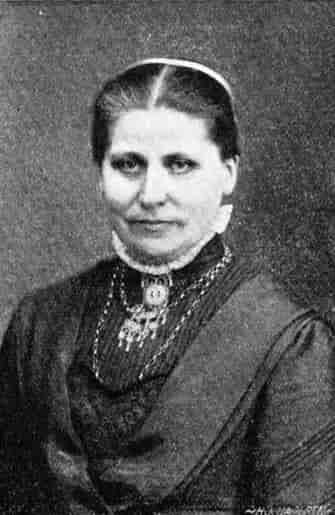
Ingeborg Appel (1911)

Ingeborg Appel née Schrøder (26 June 1869, Askov—5 November 1948, Brørup) was a Danish educator who was active at Askov Folk High School. As a teenager, she became interested in teaching gymnastics which she later studied at the Swedish School of Sport and Health Sciences in Stockholm. She introduced the subject at Askov where she also gave courses in health and nursing. In 1891, she married the school's principal Jacob Appel with whom she shared responsibility for the school, running the establishment herself during the lengthy periods when he was tied up as a government minister. In addition to her teaching skills, Appel proved to be an excellent administrator and an inspiring speaker.

== Early life, education and family ==
Born on 26 June 1868 at Askov in the south of Jutland, Ingeborg Schrøder was the daughter of the Askov folk high school principal Ludvig Peter Schrøder (1836–1908) and his wife Charlotte Caroline Elise Johanne née Wagner (1842–1904), the school's matron. She was the third of the family's 12 children. While she was a student at Vallekilde Folk High School, in 1885 the Swedish gymnastics teacher Sally Högström inspired her to teach gymnastics. From 1887 to 1889, she was one of the first Danish women to study at the Swedish School of Sport and Health Sciences (then known as Gymnastiska Centralinstitutet) in Stockholm. In September 1891, she married the folk high school principal and government minister Jacob Christian Lindberg Appel (1866–1931) with whom she had four children: Margrethe (1898), Cornelius (1901), Julie (1901) and Charlotte (1906).

== Career ==
As she grew up at Askov, Appel became increasingly involved in helping her parents at the school. After being introduced to gymnastics at Vallekilde School, when she was only 17 she started giving gymnastics lessons at Askov in the winter of 1885–86. On returning from Sweden, in 1889 she was given responsibility for running school's gymnastics courses which proved to be highly successful. It was mainly as a result of her enthusiasm that gymnastics began to be taught in rural areas throughout Denmark as she introduced the subject to folk high school associations and parish meetings. In addition, Appel addressed health education and gave introductory courses in nursing before nursing colleges had been established in Denmark.

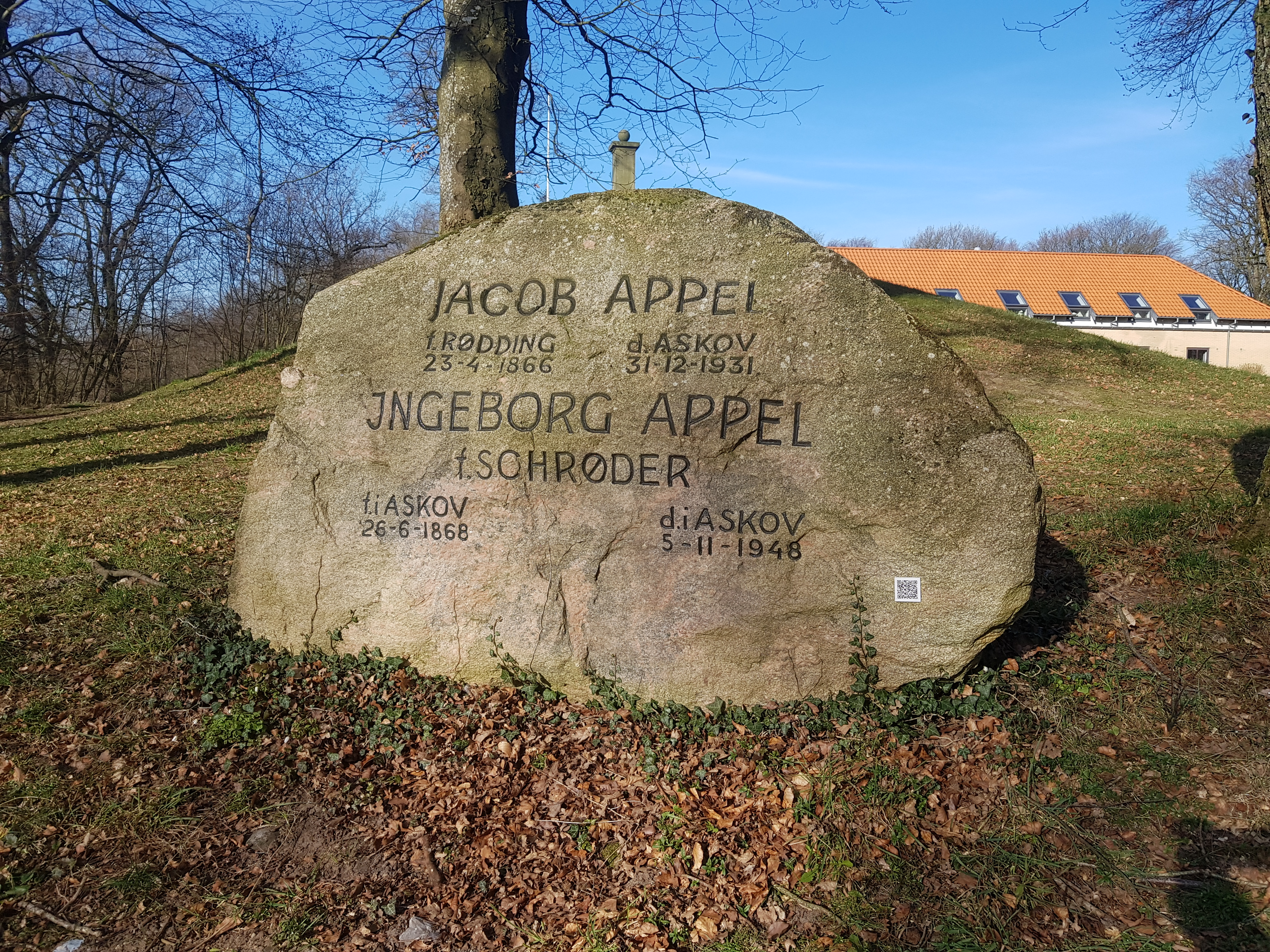
Stone in the Skibelund Krat Memorial Park

In addition to her teaching duties, Appel helped her husband with the general running of the school and acted as the school's matron, taking care of the boarders and the young unmarried teachers who were housed in her home. During the two lengthy period when her husband served as a government minister (1910–13 and 1920–24), she ran the school herself. She proved to have excellent administrative skills and was also an inspiring speaker. Following the death of her husband in 1931, Appel continued to teach at the school until her 70th birthday in 1938 when she retired.

Ingeborg Appel died on 5 November 1948 in Brørup and is buried in Askov. A stone in memory of Jacob Appel was installed in the Skibelund Krat Memorial Park in 1944 and Ingeborg Appel was added following her death.
