= Frank Webb (artist) =

American painter (1927–2022)

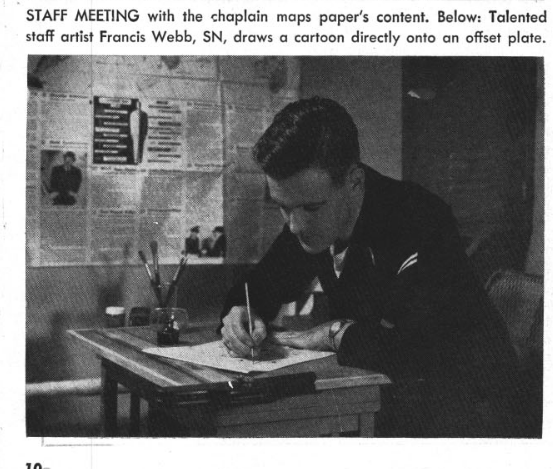
- Webb aboard the USS Macon (CA-132), 1952
- Born: 1927; Edgewood, Allegheny County, Pennsylvania
- Died: August 28, 2022 (aged 94–95); Pittsburgh, PA
- Known for: Watercolor painting

Frank Webb (14 September 1927 – 28 August 2022) was an American watercolor painter from Pittsburgh, Pennsylvania. Webb was a graduate of the Art Institute of Pittsburgh.

== Biography ==
Webb was born on September 14, 1927 in North Versailles, Pennsylvania, a suburb of Pittsburgh. He served in the US Navy during World War II and was recalled during the Korean War to serve aboard the USS Macon (CA-132). He enrolled at the Art Institute of Pittsburgh via the GI Bill and worked as a commercial illustrator after graduation, eventually taking over and running a commercial studio.

In 1970, Webb enrolled in a watercolor workshop led by Edgar Whitney, and subsequently began exhibiting extensively, becoming a member of the American Watercolor Society in 1973. This is one of the oldest non-profit societies in the United States. Webb retired from his commercial studio in 1980 and began teaching workshops in watercolor painting. He taught over 500 workshops in every state in the United States as well as internationally. He stressed the importance of having a sketch or drawing of your painting before you paint, design, draw, etc. He thought artists would be able to find all the key elements they wanted to include in a piece by doing so, and then the sketch would come to life when they began to paint.

== Publications, honors, awards ==
Webb was awarded the Mario Cooper & Dale Meyers Medal from the American Watercolor Society in 2013, and is recognized as a TWSA Master by the Transparent Watercolor Society of America. He was also a member of the National Watercolor Society, Audubon Artists, Pennsylvania Watercolor Society, and was an honorary lifetime member of the Pittsburgh Watercolor Society and the Philadelphia Watercolor Society.

Webb is the author of three instructional books on watercolor painting: Watercolor Energies, Webb on, and Strengthen Your Paintings With Dynamic Composition.

== Type of work ==
Webb focused on painting landscapes, buildings, etc. He enjoyed using the color theory and composition, design, layout, etc. Some of his work includes Dock square, Market in Mexico, Mother Lode, Mountain Farm, Nautical Nook, Pacific Highway, Place of Worship, Public Wharf, Two Bridges, etc. Webb said he enjoyed the doodle factor of very abstract buildings and views because he could simplify them and make them more fun. He thought traditional realism was boring.
