= Scarab Productions =

- Type: Private
- Industry: Film, Television, New Media Production
- Founded: 2005
- Founder: Rick Calabash
- Headquarters: Los Angeles, California USA
- Website: scarabproductions.com

Scarab Productions, Inc. is a film, television and new media production company that specializes in family entertainment. It was founded in 2005 by producer, writer, director Rick Calabash. The company currently has television and feature film projects in production and/or development with The Zanuck Company, Johnny Depp's Infinitum Nihil Warner Bros. Pictures and The Walt Disney Company. It is located in Los Angeles, California.

== Television ==
- Our Crazy Life (in development with The Disney Channel)

== Film ==
- Little Ludwig (in development with The Zanuck Company, Johnny Depp's Infinitum Nihil and Warner Bros. Pictures)
- Mickey's PhilharMagic (2003)
- Mickey's House of Villains (2002)
- Mickey's Magical Christmas (2001)
