= Mickey Mouse Works =

American animated television series

- Also known as: Disney's Mickey Mouse Works; Mouse Works
- Genre: Animated series; Comedy; Slapstick; Sketch comedy; Variety
- Based on: Mickey Mouse by Walt Disney & Ub Iwerks
- Developed by: Roberts Gannaway
- Written by: Roberts Gannaway; Rick Schneider-Calabash
- Directed by: Roberts Gannaway; Tony Craig; Rick Schneider-Calabash
- Voices of: Wayne Allwine; Tony Anselmo; Russi Taylor; Bill Farmer; Diane Michelle (season 1); Tress MacNeille (season 2); Corey Burton
- Narrated by: John Cleese (Mouse Tales and Mickey's Mechanical House); Corey Burton (Goofy and Goofy's Extreme Sports)
- Music by: Stephen James Taylor
- Country of origin: United States
- Original language: English
- No. of seasons: 2
- No. of episodes: 25 (96 segments)

Production
- Production company: Walt Disney Television Animation (Note: Animation outsourced to Toon City Animation.)

Original release
- Network: ABC (Disney's One Saturday Morning)
- Release: May 1, 1999 – December 16, 2000

Related
- House of Mouse

Mickey Mouse Works (also known as Disney's Mickey Mouse Works or simply Mouse Works) is an American animated television series produced by Walt Disney Television Animation featuring Mickey Mouse and his friends in a series of animated shorts. Roy Disney (chairman of the board of directors of The Walt Disney Company in that moment), working closely with Disney Television's Los Angeles-based senior vice president, Barry Blumberg, and executive producers Roberts Gannaway and Tony Craig, created an opening sequence in which music would be played by the characters, similar to the early Mickey Mouse cartoons. Production began in January 1998, and Mickey Mouse Works, a weekly half-hour series scheduled to premiere in January 1999, was produced by an animation team assigned exclusively to create new adventures for Disney's most famous characters.

It is formatted as a variety show, with skits starring Mickey Mouse, Minnie Mouse, Donald Duck, Daisy Duck, Goofy, Pluto and Ludwig Von Drake while other characters from the Mickey Mouse universe appear as supporting or minor characters. Musical themes for each character were composed by Stephen James Taylor with a live 12-piece band and extensive use of the fretless guitar to which the music of the series was nominated for an Annie Award in both 1999 and 2001. Most of the shorts from the series were later used in House of Mouse.

== Overview ==
As Mickey Mouse's first revival series, Mickey Mouse Works was produced to recreate the golden age of Disney's animated shorts featuring Disney's most popular characters. By using basic colors and the original sound effects, effort was put forth to capture the look and feel of "classic" Disney.

Each half-hour episode consisted of various short cartoons that fell into three general types: 90-second gag cartoons, 7-and-a-half-minute character cartoons, and 12-minute "Mouse Tales" based on famous stories. The character-based segments also included "Silly Symphonies", carrying on the tradition of that series of theatrical shorts.

The gag shorts, which lasted 90 seconds each, were shown with the following umbrella titles:

- Mickey to the Rescue: Mickey tries to rescue Minnie from Pete's trap-laden hideout.
- Maestro Minnie: Minnie conducts an orchestra of anthropomorphic rebellious musical instruments.
- Donald's Dynamite: Donald's activity is interrupted by the appearance of a well-placed bomb.
- Goofy's Extreme Sports: Goofy shows off extreme sports in the words of his off-screen narrator.
- Pluto Gets the Paper: Pluto goes through a bit of problems trying to fetch the newspaper for Mickey.
- Von Drake's House of Genius: Ludwig Von Drake shows off an invention of his which goes haywire.

With no established schedule or routine, Mickey Mouse Works was designed to look like one spontaneous flow. Adding to that feeling were the show's opening credits which ended differently each week, the only constant being an elaborate interruption from a spotlight-stealing Donald Duck.

While most skits involved individual characters, some have Mickey, Donald and Goofy running a special service group. Most Goofy skits have him doing a "how-to" segment always accompanied by a narrator. Most Donald segments were about him trying to accomplish a certain task which never works out right, frustrating him. Some stories were set to a specific theme for a specific character, but with differing scenarios – for example, one set focused on Mickey seeking to rescue Minnie from Pete, against a different obstacle in each short, while another set focused on Pluto's efforts to get Mickey his paper while facing a different problem.

== Characters ==
=== Main ===
- Mickey Mouse (voiced by Wayne Allwine, Quinton Flynn in "Minnie Takes Care of Pluto") is the main protagonist of the series. He gets himself entangled in many farcical situations due to his guilelessness, but is overall a calm character.
- Minnie Mouse (voiced by Russi Taylor) is Mickey's girlfriend; like how Donald gets frustrated, Minnie is often peeved by Mickey's impulsiveness and Daisy's loudmouth, though she is sweet and mature for her age.
- Donald Duck (voiced by Tony Anselmo) is one of Mickey's friends; he is well known for his bad temper, impatience, and self-righteousness.
- Daisy Duck (voiced by Diane Michelle in season 1 and Tress MacNeille in season 2) is Donald's girlfriend; though they both have hot tempers, Daisy is shown to be more aloof, selfish and dull-witted in this show.
- Goofy (voiced by Bill Farmer) is one of Mickey's friends; he isn't the smartest character on the show, and his idiocy usually irritates his friends.
- Pluto (voiced by Bill Farmer) is Mickey's loyal dog who is often combative towards some animals.
- Ludwig Von Drake (voiced by Corey Burton) is a scientist duck who is shown to be highly intelligent, but insane. He is Donald's uncle and Huey, Dewey, and Louie's great-uncle.

=== Supporting ===
- Pete (voiced by Jim Cummings) is Mickey's rival. He is intimidating and aggressive, but extremely gullible.
- Huey, Dewey, and Louie (voiced by Tony Anselmo), Donald's three naughty nephews.
- Chip 'n' Dale (voiced by Tress MacNeille and Corey Burton), two chipmunks, common rivals of Donald and Pluto.
- Narrator (voiced by Corey Burton), serves as a guide narrating the cartoons starring Goofy.
- Mortimer Mouse (voiced by Maurice LaMarche) is Mickey's sleazy rival who is charming, but in a condescending and harmful manner; he often flirts with Minnie Mouse and/or Daisy, and his most famous catchphrase is "I CHACHA!" (pronounced "ha cha cha").
- Clarabelle Cow (voiced by April Winchell), a friend of Mickey's gang. She is Horace's girlfriend.
- Chief O'Hara (voiced by Corey Burton), police chief in the town.
- Louie the Mountain Lion (voiced by Frank Welker), a mountain lion who wants to eat Goofy.
- Butch the Bulldog (voiced by Frank Welker), a big bulldog, rival of Pluto.
- Dinah the Dachshund (voiced by Frank Welker), Pluto's love interest.
- Phantom Blot (voiced by John O'Hurley) is the mysterious shadow in the distance, who wants to steal all the colors for himself and leave the real world stuck in black and white.
- Salty the Seal (voiced by Frank Welker), a playful seal.
- Figaro (voiced by Frank Welker), Minnie's pet cat.
- Humphrey the Bear (voiced by Jim Cummings), a bear of the forest.
- J. Audubon Woodlore (voiced by Corey Burton), a ranger in charge of Humphrey.
- Aracuan Bird (voiced by Frank Welker)
- Horace Horsecollar (voiced by Bill Farmer)
- Clara Cluck (voiced by Russi Taylor)
- Scrooge McDuck (voiced by Alan Young), is Donald's uncle and Huey, Dewey, and Louie's great-uncle.
- José Carioca (voiced by Rob Paulsen), an old friend of Donald.
- Baby Shelby (introduced) (voiced by Jeff Bennett), a small turtle who always torments Donald.
- Mrs. Turtle (introduced) (voiced by Estelle Harris), Shelby's mother.
- Mr. Jollyland (voiced by Jeff Bennett)

== Legacy ==
When the show was replaced by House of Mouse in January 2001, most of the Mouse Works segments were repeated there but the original Mickey Mouse Works format has never been seen again.

Four of the gag cartoons were released theatrically with various Disney films during 1998 and 1999 and released to theaters as commercials for the show. The cartoons included:

- Goofy's Extreme Sports: Skating the Half Pipe with I'll Be Home for Christmas
- Goofy's Extreme Sports: Paracycling with Mighty Joe Young
- Pluto Gets the Paper: Spaceship with My Favorite Martian
- Donald's Dynamite: Opera Box with Doug's 1st Movie

== Episodes ==
=== Series overview ===
Season	Episodes	Originally released	
Season	Episodes	First released	Last released
1	13	May 1, 1999	October 30, 1999
2	12	November 6, 1999	December 16, 2000

=== Season 1 (1999) ===
No. overall	No. in season	Title	Directed by	Written by	Original release date
1	1	"Mickey to the Rescue: Train Tracks" "Goofy: How to Be a Waiter" "Maestro Minnie: William Tell Overture" "Donald Duck: Donald's Failed Fourth" "Mickey, Donald & Goofy: Roller Coaster Painters"	Tony Craig and Roberts Gannaway	Kevin D. Campbell, Roberts Gannaway, Thomas Hart, and Elizabeth Stonecipher	May 1, 1999
Mickey arrives at Pete's hideout to find Minnie tied to railroad tracks with a train approaching, Mickey must save her; and himself before the train gets them. Goofy's career as a waiter is frustrating – he's always getting ordered around by customers. When things become too much, he decides to shoot for a better career and become a film star. However, what goes around comes around when his first acting role ends up being that of a waiter. Minnie, as the leader of an orchestra, goes on a wild west chase to rein in a rampaging trumpet. (Note: This short was first shown during the premiere broadcast of "Winnie the Pooh: A Valentine for You on ABC on February 13, 1999.) It's the Fourth of July and Donald Duck has found the perfect picnic spot to watch fireworks under the stars with Daisy. He battles the blanket, wrestles the lawn chairs, and combats the picnic basket until, finally, the site is set. When Daisy arrives, she discovers that Donald has miscalculated and they cannot even see the fireworks. Donald is disappointed to discover he has messed things up, again, but Daisy thinks the view is very romantic – a beautiful full moon. Mickey, Donald, and Goofy are hired to paint a roller-coaster, and there's an added incentive: whoever paints the most wins a lifetime pass to Jolly-Land Amusement Park. The competition between Mickey and Donald escalates to a wild paint war, but Goofy ends up winning the pass with his sure-and-steady pace. Donald's cold opening accident: Donald attempts to ride through on an elephant with a sign reading "Starring Donald Duck". The elephant sits on him after pulling the elephant's tail instead of the chord.
2	2	"Goofy's Extreme Sports: Skating the Half Pipe" "Mickey Mouse: Mickey's New Car" "Pluto: Pluto's Penthouse Sweet" "Donald Duck: Donald's Shell Shots"	Tony Craig and Roberts Gannaway	Kevin D. Campbell, Roberts Gannaway, Don Gillies, Thomas Hart, and Elizabeth Stonecipher	May 8, 1999
Goofy demonstrates the beautiful, yet dangerous, sport of stunt rollerblading, but once he gets rolling, he has trouble putting on the brakes. (Note: This short was first shown in theaters before I'll Be Home for Christmas on November 13, 1998.) Mickey's old car is a clunker, so in order to get to a date with Minnie on time, he trades it in on a fancy new one with all the accessories. The new car then sends him on a wild ride when the accessories start to take over. (Note: This short was first aired during the premiere broadcast of Winnie the Pooh: A Valentine for You on ABC on February 13, 1999.) When Mickey and Donald head out on a double-date with Minnie and Daisy, Pluto is left behind feeling lonely. Then he spies Tiki, a beautiful Maltese Terrier, and pursues her to her sky-high skyscraper. However, once inside her penthouse suite, Pluto finds the tables turned, with Tiki in hot pursuit of him. Portrait photographer Donald has to take a picture of Shelby, an adorable baby turtle who refuses to cooperate. Donald's cold opening accident: Donald brings down a window blind saying "Starring Donald Duck", which rolls up taking Donald with it.
3	3	"Donald's Dynamite: Bowling Alley" "Mickey Mouse: Mickey's Airplane Kit" "Von Drake's House of Genius: Time Reverser" "Mickey, Donald & Goofy: Turkey Catchers" "Silly Symphony: Dance of the Goofys"	Tony Craig and Roberts Gannaway	Kevin D. Campbell, Roberts Gannaway, Thomas Hart, and Elizabeth Stonecipher	May 15, 1999
Donald is enjoying a relaxing day at the bowling alley until his ball turns out to be a bomb. When he tries to defuse it, the pins really begin to fly. Mickey orders a do-it-yourself airplane kit as a special surprise for a date with Minnie. Rushed for time, he ignores the instructions and pays a bitter price when the plane falls apart during their date. Ludwig Von Drake introduces his new invention: a time machine, but when he depends on his greatest creation to get him out of trouble, Von Drake's time quickly runs out. Mickey, Donald and Goofy open a turkey catching business and their first customer is a pompous pilgrim. The three friends come up with the perfect plan. As they do every night, the Goofy Fairies come out to close all the flowers. When the goofiest Goofy Fairy causes his boss to be captured by a young boy with mad scientist ambitions, he must overcome his goofy shortcomings and come to the rescue before his boss becomes a science project. Donald's cold opening accident: Donald sails through on a sailboat and unfurls the sail which reads "Starring Donald Duck". The sailboat then sinks.
4	4	"Pluto Gets the Paper: Spaceship" "Donald Duck: Donald's Rocket Ruckus" "Goofy's Extreme Sports: Paracycling" "Mickey, Donald & Goofy: Organ Donors" "Mickey Mouse: Mickey's Mistake"	Tony Craig and Roberts Gannaway	Kevin D. Campbell, Roberts Gannaway, Thomas Hart, and Elizabeth Stonecipher	May 22, 1999
Mickey sends Pluto out to fetch the newspaper, this time only to be taken aboard an alien spacecraft, where he is examined with tools and uses the transformation ray to make him to have two legs and turns him an alien, a mammoth, a pen with a piece of writing paper and a dinosaur which he grows gigantic and the transformation ray turns him back and brings the newspaper back to Mickey and he pats him but his ears turn into alien antenna. (Note: The short was first shown in theaters with My Favorite Martian on February 12, 1999.) Huey, Dewey, and Louie want to go on the best ride in the whole amusement park, The Rocket Ruckus, but Uncle Donald is the ride operator, and he alters the height-requirement sign so his nephews are too short to ride. When the angry boys finally succeed in getting past him, Donald spins the ride out of control and his nephews decide to take mischievous revenge. Goofy defies the laws of physics and common sense when he bicycles off a cliff and ungracefully parachutes to the ground. (Note: The short was shown in theaters with Mighty Joe Young on December 25, 1998.) Mickey, Donald, and Goofy deliver a used pipe organ to a deranged Toy Maker. They soon learn that he does not want a pipe organ – he wants their internal organs. Mickey finds a wad of money and buys Minnie an expensive hair bow. Then he finds out the money belonged to the orphans and goes through many disguises in his efforts to get the hair bow back from Minnie so he can get the money back to the orphans. Donald's cold opening accident: Donald brings through an elegant flashing electrical sign which says "Starring Donald Duck" and then turns into a time and temperature flasher. Donald exclaims "Aw Phooey!" as this happens while looking at the viewers.
5	5	"Maestro Minnie: Hungarian Rhapsody No. 6" "Goofy: How to Be a Spy" "Silly Symphony: Donald's Valentine Dollar" "Pluto: Pluto's Kittens"	Tony Craig and Roberts Gannaway	Kevin D. Campbell, Roberts Gannaway, Thomas Hart, and Elizabeth Stonecipher	May 29, 1999
Minnie's set on playing a classical piece, while the instruments are set on something with a slightly different tempo. When paranoid Goofy thinks the neighbors are up to something suspicious, he orders himself a mail-order spy kit and learns how to be a spy. It's Valentine's Day, but Donald can only afford a "$1.00" box of candy for Daisy's present. His dollar bill blows away on a gust of wind and into a kite-flying park. Donald straps on a kite to make a set of wings and takes to the sky, battling other kites, stormy winds and his pesky, playful dollar-bill before he emerges victorious. Pluto overcomes his dislike for felines and rescues three stray kittens from a rainstorm. Hiding them from Mickey, Pluto takes the blame for their antics, and gets thrown out of the house for breaking the rules. In the end, Mickey discovers the kittens and all is well. (Note: The short was shown on the 1999 Australian VHS release of The Aristocats.) Donald's cold opening accident: Donald unfolds an umbrella which says "Starring Donald Duck" which then gets zapped by a lightning bolt.
6	6	"Von Drake's House of Genius: Remote Controlled Laser Lawn Mower" "Pluto: Pluto vs. the Watchdog" "Donald's Dynamite: Opera Box" "Mouse Tales: Around the World in Eighty Days"	Tony Craig and Roberts Gannaway	Kevin D. Campbell, Roberts Gannaway, Thomas Hart, Elizabeth Stonecipher, and Ron Weiner	June 5, 1999
When Ludwig Von Drake's latest invention rages out of control, Von Drake may be the one who ends up with a trim. Because of Pluto's ineptitude at watch-dogging, Mickey gets a new watchdog. Little does he realize the new dog is part of Pete's plot to rob Mickey's house. (Note: One of seven shorts to be animated with traditional cel animation.) Donald and Daisy are enjoying a relaxing night at the opera when Donald reaches into Daisy's purse and pulls out a bomb. Now he must defuse it without Daisy noticing. (Note: The short was first shown in theaters before Doug's 1st Movie on March 26, 1999, but it was not present on the VHS release.) Based on Jules Verne's novel, in this adaptation Mickey Mouse must circumnavigate the globe in 80 days to receive his inheritance and save an orphanage. Donald's cold opening accident: Donald plants flowers which bloom into letters that spell "Starring Donald Duck". They are eaten from underneath by a gopher who pops his head up to let out a loud "burp!"
7	7	"Donald's Dynamite: Fishing" "Minnie Mouse: Purple Pluto" "Von Drake's House of Genius: Money Increaser" "Mickey, Donald & Goofy: Sandwich Makers" "Pluto: Pluto's Arrow Error"	Tony Craig and Roberts Gannaway	Kevin D. Campbell, Roberts Gannaway, Thomas Hart, Elizabeth Stonecipher, and Jess Winfield	June 12, 1999
Donald is enjoying a relaxing day of fishing when he reels in a bomb. He tries to throw it back, but a cunning frog is determined to stop him. Minnie is getting Pluto ready for the big dog show when she accidentally uses hair dye instead of shampoo. Mickey later finds out that his true-blue friend is now purple. Ludwig Von Drake believes his new invention – a Money Increaser Machine – will save people from poverty, but it ends up getting him thrown in jail for counterfeiting. Goofy is swept away with power when he becomes the captain of a submarine sandwich shop, but he soon learns that cooperation and friendship are essential for running a tight ship. When Pluto is rejected by Dinah, he finds a quiver of magic cupid arrows and aims on using them to obtain her love, but his plan backfires when the arrow accidentally bulls-eyes Butch. Donald's cold opening accident: Donald builds a brick wall on which he paints the words, "Starring Donald Duck", but the wall falls over on him.
8	8	"Mickey to the Rescue: Staircase" "Pluto: Pluto Runs Away" "Daisy Duck: Daisy Visits Minnie" "Goofy: How to Ride a Bicycle"	Tony Craig and Roberts Gannaway	Kevin D. Campbell, Roberts Gannaway, Thomas Hart, and Elizabeth Stonecipher	June 19, 1999
Mickey must battle a contraption-filled staircase to rescue Minnie from Pete's hideout. When Pluto digs up Mickey's yard to bury a bone, Mickey has to discipline him. Thinking he's being treated poorly, Pluto runs away, only to bump into Pete and learn what bad treatment is really like. Minnie Mouse is looking forward to a quiet night at home, but the peace and quiet is soon interrupted when Daisy Duck invites herself over, not to mention a lion that escaped from the zoo. Mr. Biker (a.k.a. Goofy) is seized with bicycle race fever, but accidentally totals his bike. He goes through all the lessons of bike riding, ending once more in his race-fever craze and competing in a high-pressure BMX stadium race. Donald's cold opening accident: Donald drives up in a truck with "Starring Donald Duck" painted on the side. The truck then drives away without him, and then returns to run over Donald.
9	9	"Goofy's Extreme Sports: Rock Climbing" "Silly Symphony: Hansel and Gretel" "Donald Duck: Donald on Ice" "Mickey Mouse: Mickey's Mechanical House"	Tony Craig and Roberts Gannaway	Kevin D. Campbell, Roberts Gannaway, Thomas Hart, Elizabeth Stonecipher, and Jess Winfield	September 11, 1999
Goofy grapples with equipment, balance and an annoying announcer as he scales to new peaks and plunges. Mickey and Minnie play the roles of Hansel and Gretel in a musical retelling of the fairy tale. Huey, Dewey and Louie are building a snowman for the big snowman contest, but Donald's skating mishaps destroy their first attempt, so they immediately retaliate. In this rhyming tale, Mickey is unsatisfied and annoyed by his old and noisy house and decides to buy a new home that runs itself. He later discovers, however, that this house is not much more comfortable, so he decides to move back at the end. Donald's cold opening accident: Donald flies by in an airplane with a banner that reads "Starring Donald Duck". After flying offscreen, the airplane blows up, leaving Donald flying the engine held together with a few leftover parts of the plane.
10	10	"Pluto Gets the Paper: Street Cleaner" "Donald Duck: Donald's Dinner Date" "Maestro Minnie: Brahms Lullabye" "Von Drake: Hydro Squirter" "Mickey Mouse: Mickey's Piano Lesson"	Tony Craig and Roberts Gannaway	Kevin D. Campbell, Roberts Gannaway, Thomas Hart, Elizabeth Stonecipher, and Jess Winfield	September 18, 1999
This time Pluto gets sucked up into the bowels of an oncoming street sweeper in his endless quest to fetch Mickey's newspaper. (Note: The short was first shown on the 1999 VHS release of One Hundred and One Dalmatians, released on March 9.) Donald must restrain his temper on a dinner date with Daisy, even though the incompetent Goofy is their waiter. When Minnie conducts an orchestra come to life, she keeps dozing off during her favorite lullaby, but the instruments take over and wake her up. When Von Drake has trouble with his shower, he makes some adjustments and accidentally turns it into a teleportation device. With each twist of the faucet, towel-clad Von Drake finds himself in another embarrassing situation. When Minnie signs herself and Mickey up to perform in a piano recital, Mickey decides the music is too easy for him to practice. When he begins the performance, he realizes that without practice things never go as planned. Donald's cold opening accident: Donald pulls down a blind that "Starring Donald Duck" which rolls up taking him with it.
11	11	"Mickey to the Rescue: Cages And Cannons" "Mickey Mouse: Mickey's Remedy" "Goofy's Extreme Sports: Wakeboarding" "Mouse Tales: A Midsummer Night's Dream"	Tony Craig and Roberts Gannaway	Kevin D. Campbell, Roberts Gannaway, Thomas Hart, Elizabeth Stonecipher, and Jess Winfield	September 25, 1999
When Pete kidnaps Minnie and whisks her off to his funhouse-like hideout, Mickey must cross a cartoony bridge and dodge Pete's boxing-glove cannons to rescue her from a cage suspended high above the ground. Donald decides to give Mickey a try in controlling his three nephews, but Mickey has more than a few surprises up his sleeve, including the threat of "Bolvainian Brain Fever". Goofy takes to the water to master the art of wakeboarding, but his attempts at difficult stunts leave him high and dry. Mickey, Minnie, Donald and Daisy compete in Shakespeare's tale of mismatched lovers and a special love potion. Donald's cold opening accident: Donald pulls up in a train engine with a car attached with a banner that reads "Starring Donald Duck". While cleaning a smudge off of the side of the car, the side falls off, flattening him.
12	12	"Pluto Gets the Paper: Bubble Gum" "Mickey Mouse: Mickey Tries to Cook" "Donald Duck: Donald and the Big Nut" "Mickey Mouse: Topsy Turvy Town"	Tony Craig and Roberts Gannaway	Kevin D. Campbell, Roberts Gannaway, Thomas Hart, Elizabeth Stonecipher, and Jess Winfield	October 2, 1999
Mickey sends Pluto out to fetch the newspaper, who has to fight with a discarded piece of bubble gum to retrieve it. (Note: The short was first shown at the beginning of the 1999 VHS release of The Rescuers on January 5, and again on March 23. It was also shown on the premiere broadcast of Winnie the Pooh: A Valentine for You on February 13 of the same year.) When Mickey discovers Minnie has fallen for José Carioca who can cook, he tries to make a fancy dinner to win her back. Donald accidentally spills a super growth formula which results the growth of a giant nut which he wants to take to competition while Chip and Dale want to eat it. Stranded in Topsy Turvy Town, a place where everything is the opposite of normal, Mickey and Minnie accidentally break the town's strange laws and are sentenced to an unusual punishment. Donald's cold opening accident: Donald blows up a balloon which reads "Starring Donald Duck" but he blows it up too far and it explodes.
13	13	"Von Drake's House of Genius: Teledinger" "Goofy: How to Haunt a House" "Maestro Minnie: Flight of the Bumblebee" "Mouse Tales: The Nutcracker"	Tony Craig and Roberts Gannaway	Kevin D. Campbell, Roberts Gannaway, Thomas Hart, and Elizabeth Stonecipher	October 30, 1999
Ludwig Von Drake's new invention has a certain ring to it – a Teledinger, but he discovers the invention is already in use and is commonly known as the telephone. In order to demonstrate how to haunt a house, the narrator arranges for Goofy to temporarily be "not living" and selects Donald Duck to be the one whom Goofy's ghost will haunt. Minnie must tame a buzzing bumblebee that is disrupting her symphony. When Maria (Minnie) is captured by the Mouse King (Donald), her beloved nutcracker doll turns into a handsome Prince Mickey and rescues her from becoming the Mouse Queen. This familiar story is told by a comical narrator with big band versions of the familiar Tchaikovsky "Nutcracker" music. Donald's cold opening accident: Donald drops down a huge block of granite which he carves into a monument which reads "Starring Donald Duck". The monument collapses around him, leaving a pile of rock which reads "Darn Old Duck".

=== Season 2 (1999–2000) ===
No. overall	No. in season	Title	Directed by	Written by	Original release date
14	1	"Pluto Gets the Paper: Vending Machine" "Donald Duck: Donald's Grizzly Guest" "Donald's Dynamite: Snowman" "Mickey, Donald & Goofy: Mickey Foils the Phantom Blot"	Tony Craig and Roberts Gannaway	Roberts Gannaway, Elizabeth Stonecipher, Kevin D. Campbell, Henry Gilroy and Thomas Hart	November 6, 1999
Instead of picking the paper up from the ground, Pluto has to balance a quarter and wrestle with a newspaper vending machine. (Note: This short, along with "Minnie Takes Care of Pluto", was one of the only two "Mouse Works" shorts that didn't show up again on "House of Mouse" for unknown reasons.) With the rainy season approaching, Humphrey the Bear, dissatisfied with his leaky cave, decides to make camp in Donald's spiffy trailer. Donald has a nice winter outing building a snowman until he discovers that his snowman's head is actually a bomb. When Von Drake arrives at Mickey, Donald and Goofy's delivery service with a mysterious package that he wants delivered to himself, our heroes smell a mystery. The mystery deepens when the package is stolen by the Phantom Blot. Donald's cold opening accident: Donald attempts the boat and sail again, but this time he is squashed by a whale and sent to the bottom of the sea.
15	2	"Daisy Duck: Daisy's Road Trip" "Goofy: Goofy's Big Kitty" "Von Drake: Relaxing with Von Drake"	Tony Craig and Roberts Gannaway	Tracy Berna, Jymn Magon and Elizabeth Stonecipher	December 4, 1999
Mickey and Minnie are considering a quiet drive in the country to see the sunset by themselves, when Daisy happens by and decides to invite herself along. Goofy brings home a new kitty at the same time that a mountain lion has escaped from the circus. Goofy is unaware that he mistook the lion for his kitty. Ludwig Von Drake uses Donald as a guinea pig to demonstrate various methods of stress management. Donald's cold opening accident: Donald unfolds an umbrella which reads "Starring Donald Duck". The umbrella promptly folds, swallowing him up.
16	3	"Goofy: How to Be a Baseball Fan" "Mickey, Donald & Goofy: Locksmiths" "Minnie Mouse: Minnie Takes Care of Pluto"	Tony Craig and Roberts Gannaway	Neil Alsip, Jim Peterson, John Behnke, Rob Humphrey, Thomas Hart and Steve Roberts	January 22, 2000
Goofy takes time out from being a participant in sport to join the fans in the bleachers. Mickey, Donald and Goofy in business, this time as locksmiths who cannot even seem to get their own front door open. Mickey drops Pluto off at Minnie's house unexpectedly, so Pluto's conscience convinces him that Minnie is out to do him in. (Note: This short, along with "Pluto Gets the Paper: Vending Machine", was one of the only two Mouse Works shorts that didn't show up again on House of Mouse due to dark content. Later reruns of the original Mickey Mouse Works replaced this cartoon with "L'il Bad Wolf", which was made for House of Mouse.) Donald's cold opening accident: Donald floats by in a hot air balloon reading "Starring Donald Duck" which suddenly punctures and deflates leaving Donald stranded in mid-air.
17	4	"Donald's Dynamite: Magic Act" "Donald Duck: Survival of the Woodchucks" "Mickey Mouse: Mickey's Rival Returns" "Silly Symphony: Mickey and the Seagull"	Tony Craig and Roberts Gannaway	Rick Schneider, Gregg Taylor, Brian Swenlin and Roberts Gannaway	February 19, 2000
Donald tries to perform a magic act on stage but is continually interrupted by a reappearing bomb. In order to win Junior Woodchucks merit badges, Huey, Dewey and Louie have to negotiate a difficult survival course, but they soon discover that Donald, their scout leader, never finished the course himself. Mickey tries for a relaxing day at the beach and maybe a date with Minnie afterwards, but his day is ruined by the return of Mortimer Mouse, an old rival for Minnie's affection. Each tugboat is the fleet is assigned a seagull from the flock. Even Mickey's, who gets a replacement when his regular one begins using a wheelchair following an accident. Donald's cold opening accident: Donald brings down a steel plate that reads "Starring Donald Duck. He rivets this over the regular logo, but not well enough as the plate falls over, flattening him into his hard hat.
18	5	"Goofy: Goofy's Radio" "Mickey, Donald & Goofy: Car Washers" "Pluto: Pluto's Seal Deal"	Tony Craig and Roberts Gannaway	Steve Roberts, Neil Alsip and Roberts Gannaway	March 11, 2000
Goofy decides to escape the pressures of big-city life and take a vacation at Brownstone Park. He takes his radio with him, which has a curious effect on Louie, the Mountain Lion. The terrific trio go into business washing cars, and who should their first customer be but Pete. They however also have a fairly destructive washing machine. Pluto is given the responsibility to guard a package that is being delivered for Mickey, but instead of the cappuccino machine he's expecting, he gets to take charge of Salty, the Seal. Donald's cold opening accident: Donald attempts to bring down a series of stage curtains with his name, but is pelted with tomatoes and rotten vegetables before he can.
19	6	"Mickey Mouse: Mickey's Mixed Nuts" "Goofy's Extreme Sports: Shark Feeding" "Mickey Mouse: Mickey's Mountain" "Donald Duck: computer.don"	Tony Craig and Roberts Gannaway	Brian Swenlin, Elizabeth Stonecipher and Henry Gilroy	April 15, 2000
While Minnie is short of nuts, Chip and Dale have only golf balls. Mickey and the chipmunks head to the store competing for the last batch of nuts. Goofy dons scuba gear and an anti-shark cage to go underwater and feed the sharks. The first person to the top of "unnamed mountain" gets to give it a name. Mickey wants to claim it in the name of Minnie, but has to race Pete to the top. A technologically behind-the-times Donald is coerced by Daisy into buying a computer, or be labeled a "dweeb". Donald's cold opening accident: Donald rides by on a stagecoach which reads "Starring Donald Duck" on the side. The donkey, however, gets mad and kicks Donald and the coach offscreen.
20	7	"Donald Duck: Donald's Halloween Scare" "Donald Duck: Donald's Lighthouse" "Goofy: How to Take Care of Your Yard"	Tony Craig and Roberts Gannaway	Jymn Magon, Henry Gilroy, Thomas Hart and Doug Langdale	May 20, 2000
Donald scares the candy out of Huey, Dewey and Louie's trick or treat bags, so naturally, they have to retaliate. Donald attempts to rid his lighthouse of a rather stubborn pelican. Goofy learns to take care of his yard, throughout the four seasons. Donald's cold opening accident: Donald lays train track and brings in a train car which reads "Starring Donald Duck", but another set of tracks gets laid in front of it, and another train comes through which runs him down.
21	8	"Pluto Gets the Paper: Mortimer" "Minnie Mouse: Minnie Visits Daisy" "Goofy: How to Wash Dishes" "Donald Duck: Domesticated Donald"	Tony Craig and Roberts Gannaway	Roberts Gannaway, Tracy Berna, Cameron Selwood and Kevin Hopps	June 10, 2000
Mortimer shows up again to try to steal Mickey's paper when Pluto is sent out to retrieve it. Minnie decides to visit Daisy and bring one of her "famous" apple pies, but cannot seem to get Daisy's attention when she comes knocking on the door. Despite the title, this short features Goofy as a travel-hound while charging everything on his new charge card. Shelby the turtle returns as Donald is forced to serve as babysitter to the hyperactive youngster. Donald's cold opening accident: Donald rolls out a magic disappearing box, shuts the curtains (which read "Duck Works"), but when he opens them, an upset Louie the Mountain Lion (as a tiger) has appeared.
22	9	"Mickey Mouse: Mickey's Mix-Up" "Donald Duck: Whitewater Donald" "Mickey Mouse: Mickey's Christmas Chaos"	Tony Craig and Roberts Gannaway	The Trio, Tracy Berna and Thomas Hart	September 16, 2000
Mickey buys a new fax machine. His first few faxes are a nasty one to Mortimer and a sweet one to Minnie. When he suspects that the faxes have gotten switched, he has to secretly try to get the nasty fax back from Minnie before she reads it. Donald tries to go fishing, taking Daisy along, who is under the impression that they are going on a romantic date. Mickey gets into a Christmas decorating contest with next-door neighbor Mortimer. Donald's cold opening accident: Donald rides by in a Goodyear type blimp with an electronic sign that reads "Duck Works". The sign begins to spark, shorts out and fries the blimp.
23	10	"Donald Duck: Donald's Fish Fry" "Pluto: Presto Pluto" "Mickey Mouse: Mickey's Cabin"	Tony Craig and Roberts Gannaway	Jess Winfield, Steve Roberts, Jymn Magon and Thomas Hart	October 21, 2000
Humphrey the Bear is told to get a big fish to get him through the coming winter season, but mistakenly snags the one that Donald has on the end of his line. Pluto is again in competition with Butch for Dinah's affections when he accidentally swallows a magic wand. Mickey is snowbound with Pete and his cousin Zeke who have stolen an automated teller machine. Donald's cold opening accident: Donald floats by in a hot air balloon which reads "Starring Donald Duck". The balloon releases out the bottom and blows him away.
24	11	"Pluto Gets the Paper: Vending Machine" "Mickey, Donald & Goofy: Mickey's Answering Service" "Pluto: Pluto's Magic Paws" "Mickey Mouse: Mickey's Big Break"	Tony Craig and Roberts Gannaway	Roberts Gannaway, John Ludin and Neil Alsip	November 18, 2000
Instead of picking the paper up from the ground, Pluto has to balance a quarter and wrestle with a newspaper vending machine. Mickey, Donald, and Goofy try business together as the owners of a telephone answering service, but they soon have to deal with a fully automated business when getting their phone repaired. Mickey mistakenly picks up a pair of magic gloves from the dry cleaners instead of his regular gloves. When Pluto is left at home with them, disaster breaks out. When Donald and Mickey break a picture of Minnie and Daisy by playing football in the house, they go to extreme lengths to try to replace it. Donald's cold opening accident: Donald rolls in a huge cake that reads "Starring Donald Duck", but Clarabelle pops out of it, grabbing Donald and kissing him into a frenzy.
25	12	"Donald Duck: Bird Brained Donald" "Goofy: How to Be a Gentleman" "Donald Duck: Donald's Pool"	Tony Craig and Roberts Gannaway	Jymn Magon and Elizabeth Stonecipher	December 16, 2000
Donald again attempts to get a picture of the elusive and maniacal Aracuan Bird. In order to join a ritzy country club, Goofy must learn to dress and behave like a proper gentleman. Donald's relaxing day by the pool is crashed by Mrs. Turtle, who only wants to sunbathe, and Shelby who as usual, only wants to cause trouble. (Note: This is the only standard-length Mouse Works short to be shown in two different episodes of House of Mouse.) Donald's cold opening accident: Donald spray paints the words "Starring Donald Duck" over the official logo, but is then arrested for vandalism.

== Home media ==
While the series has not seen an official VHS or DVD release, several shorts have been featured on other releases.

In April 2005, Disney released a DVD in European, Latin American and Asian territories entitled Mickey's Laugh Factory, which contained nine selected shorts taken from this series as well as those from House of Mouse with jokes told by various children used as framing material. While some shorts have the Mickey Mouse Works title card background, others have the House of Mouse version (the Mouse Works version has various mechanics in the background including a Mickey-shaped one and one with the Mouse Works text inside it, but the House of Mouse version has various moving swirls). Cartoons include Hickory Dickory Mickey, Mickey Tries to Cook, Organ Donors, Mickey's Airplane Kit, Street Cleaner, Mickey's New Car, Bubble Gum, Mickey's Big Break and Mickey's Mix-Up.

The DVD Disney's Learning Adventures: Mickey's Seeing the World includes the cartoons Around the World in Eighty Days and Mickey's Mechanical House slightly abridged to fit in with the documentary nature of the DVD.

On November 11, 2008, the eighth wave of Walt Disney Treasures was released. One of the sets released in this wave, The Chronological Donald, Volume Four, features a handful of Donald-centric shorts from both Mickey Mouse Works and House of Mouse as bonuses, including Bird Brained Donald, Donald and the Big Nut, Donald's Charmed Date, Donald's Dinner Date, Donald's Failed Fourth, Donald's Rocket Ruckus, Donald's Shell Shots, Donald's Valentine Dollar, Music Store Donald and Survival of the Woodchucks.
