= Rick Calabash =

American television director

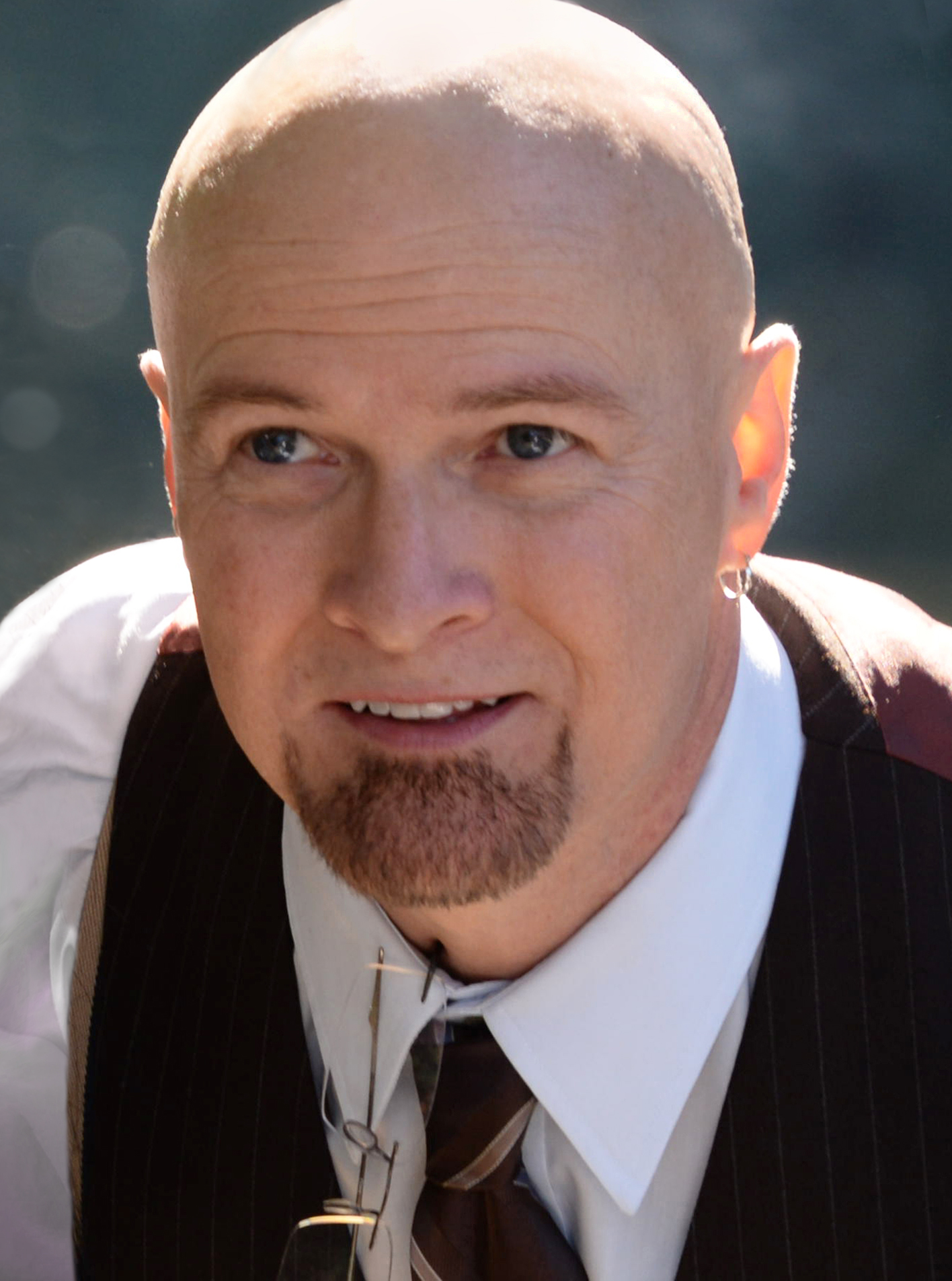
- Born: Richard Thomas Schneider; Wheeling, West Virginia, US
- Education: West Liberty University; The Art Institute of Pittsburgh
- Occupations: Producer, writer, director
- Years active: 1990–present
- Employer: Zanuck Family Entertainment
- Notable work: Cats Don't Dance, Disney's 101 Dalmatians: The Series, Mickey Mouse Works, House of Mouse

Rick Calabash (sometimes credited as Rick Schneider) is an American film and television producer, writer and director, particularly of animated family films.

== Biography ==
Calabash was born in Wheeling, West Virginia. As a teen, Calabash once worked for Mister Rogers' Neighborhood, for whom he designed and built theatrical sets.

His first break in the entertainment industry came from producer, David Kirschner, for whom he developed many television and feature film projects during Kirschner's tenure as president of Hanna-Barbera Productions.

When Kirschner formed Turner Feature Animation, Calabash joined the team as a storyboard supervisor, character designer and writer, working on such films as The Pagemaster, which starred Christopher Lloyd and Macaulay Culkin and the Annie Award winning animated feature Cats Don't Dance, which starred Scott Bakula and Hal Holbrook with original songs by Randy Newman and Natalie Cole.

Notable television productions for which Calabash served as producer, writer, and director are Disney's 101 Dalmatians: The Series, for which he received two Emmy nominations and won a Silver Angel Award, House of Mouse and Disney's Mickey Mouse Works for which he won a Golden Reel Award. He also served as a storyboard supervisor and director on the two highest-grossing home video releases of 2001 and 2002, Mickey's House of Villains and Mickey's Magical Christmas: Snowed in at the House of Mouse.

In addition to his work in television and film, he was a storyboard artist and creative consultant on the popular theme park attraction Mickey's PhilharMagic, a 3-D musical featurette, which premiered on the largest screen in the world at the Walt Disney World Resort in 2003, followed by installations at Hong Kong Disneyland, Tokyo Disneyland, Disneyland Paris, and Disney's California Adventure in 2019.

Calabash was formerly the president of Scarab Productions, Inc., a film, television and new media production company which has projects in development with The Disney Channel, Zanuck Family Entertainment, Johnny Depp's Infinitum Nihil and Warner Bros. Pictures.

Calabash is currently an executive at Zanuck Family Entertainment.

== Filmography ==
=== Producer ===
- Disney's 101 Dalmatians: The Series (1997)

=== Writer ===
- Cats Don't Dance (1997)
- Mickey Mouse Works (1999)
- House of Mouse (2001)

=== Director ===
- 101 Dalmatians: The Series (1997)
- Mickey Mouse Works (1999)
- House of Mouse (2000)
- Mickey's Magical Christmas (2001)
- Mickey's House of Villains (2002)

=== Consultant, supervisor, or other ===
- Wake, Rattle, and Roll (1990)
- Tom & Jerry Kids (1990)
- Gravedale High (1990)
- Jetsons: The Movie (1990)
- Capitol Critters (1992)
- Fish Police (1992)
- The Pagemaster (1994)
- Cats Don't Dance (1997)
- Mickey Mouse Works (1999)
- House of Mouse (2000)
- Mickey's Magical Christmas (2001)
- Mickey's House of Villains (2002)
- Mickey's PhilharMagic (2003)
- Get Low (2009)
- The Zero Theorem (2013)

== Awards and nominations ==
- Emmy Awards

Outstanding Children's Animated Program
1998 101 Dalmatians: The Series (Nomination)
1999 101 Dalmatians: The Series (Nomination)

- Angel Awards

Award of Excellence Outstanding Children's Television Program
1998 101 Dalmatians: The Series (Won)

- Golden Reel Awards

Outstanding Achievement in the Motion Picture & Television Industries
2000 Disney's Mickey Mouse Works (Won)
