= Meri Toppelius =

Finnish-born American educational theorist

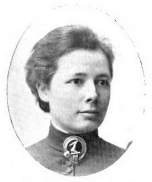
Meri Toppelius

Meri Toppelius (9 July 1863 – 1896) was a Finnish-born American educational theorist who was the first to introduce the sloyd system in the United States.

== Early years and education ==
Jenny Maria ("Meri") Toppelius was born in Hamina, Finland, a daughter of General Gustaf Viktor Toppelius (1825–1906), of the Finnish army, and Jenny Hedvig Carolina Toppelius. She was also a niece of Zachris Topelius, the poet laureate of Finland.

Toppelius was educated and lived as the eldest daughter of a family of rank, but she sought in vain for the satisfaction which social distinction was expected to give. At seventeen, she decided to devote her life to children. The rounded culture of manual and mental accomplishment, which is characteristic of the North-European education, was available to her, and at Vera Hjelt's training school, in Helsinki, she found sloyd (Swedish: slöjd). After taking a course under Hjelt, a progressive educator, Toppelius remained in the school as instructor.

== Career ==
=== Finland ===
Toppelius gained five years' experience as a teacher of sloyd under Hjelt. During this time, Mrs. Hemingway, an educational leader of Boston, became interested in the sloyd system and its results in the north of Europe. Hemingway made a request of Toppelius to come to Boston and introduce to the United States the ideal of hand education. Toppelius accepted Hemingway's request, and planned to come and present the sloyd system but she became ill a short time prior to her expected departure. Toppelius requested a younger sister, Sigrid, whom she had already interested in sloyd work to a sufficient extent to be well trained for an instructor, to take her commission and go in her place to Boston. Her parents, though reluctant to allow their eldest daughter the independence of traveling on such a mission in a foreign land, refused to allow their younger daughter to be alone for such an assignment.

=== Early years in the U.S. ===
Toppelius accompanied Sigrid to Boston in 1890, and herself took up a course of instruction in the gymnasium, while her sister carried on the sloyd in a primary school according to Hemingway's plans. In the spring of 1891, the Chicago Woman's Club asked Toppelius to come to Chicago, which she did, leaving Sigrid to conduct the work in Boston. Toppelius conducted private sloyd classes in Chicago, arranged by those interested in the movement, and spoke of it whenever opportunity afforded her to do so. In the summer of that year, she went to Bay View, Michigan, to become one of the summer Chautauqua faculty, where she had a class for teachers, and also an observation class where children could be seen at work.

She addressed the National Education Association in convention at St. Paul, Minnesota and the Kansas State Teachers' Association at Topeka, while it was yet difficult for her to express herself readily and satisfactorily in English. While in St. Paul, and after teaching several months in Chicago, Toppelius received so many calls for teachers in sloid, she determined to open a training institute at the corner of Fifth avenue and Madison street, Chicago. In 1892, Sigrid returned to Finland. In 1893, at the time of the World's Columbian Exposition in Chicago, Toppelius was appointed, by request of Ebba Nordquist, née Baronesse Alfthan, of Finland, to address the Auxiliary Congress concerning the work of the Finnish women.

=== Chicago ===
A wedge was entered in the public school system by allowing Toppelius a sloyd department in Chicago's Agassiz school. A room was fitted out under her direction in the basement, and the boys of each grade sent down to her a few hours each week. With perseverance and enthusiasm, she introduced to the public school system of Chicago the culture of hand and eye education. With added effort and cheerfulness she took up a mission work of sloyd among the boys of a needy community on the farther side of the city. In time, the agitation of the school board over "fads and their uses" came up. Toppelius was categorised as a faddist. But her strong personal force, her enthusiasm and courage, her work and its stronghold on her friends, her associates, and her pupils, worked in her favor. Solely through her enthusiasm, and inspired by her earnestness, one of the school board made an effort to assist Tooppelius, and obtained an appropriation of US$25,000 to carry on and propagate the sloyd work which she pioneered.

The sloyd of Sweden and Denmark was arranged for the boys of upper grades, allowing for physical ability to handle tools and a mental power sufficiently developed to grasp the purpose and aim of the work. The sloyd of Finland adapted itself to the needs of the growing child, regardless of sex; the requirement of development was the same, and lent itself to the moulding of the abilities and powers to the development of capacity, physical and mental, for its best appreciation and use. Toppelius' whole theory of instruction was the system for the child, not the child for the method. It was her regret that only the boys of the Agassiz school were assigned to her department. To her, the needs of childhood were universal, not of a class or sex. She grafted her already simplified system upon the kindergarten, and worked out and adapted her model series by careful experiment for the best result to her pupils. The work which they accomplished, the exercise which they gained, the dexterity which they acquired was in unity of concept. Toppelius defined the aim of her work as universally useful, idealizing the practical, and giving harmonious education, and systematically developing the usefulness of the child.

She said in an address before a body of teachers:—

“One may confess to any fundamental pedagogic views that he desires, but all will ultimately agree with Pestalozzi on the necessity of harmonious development of the powers of soul and body. May we always remember the words of Locke, ‘a sound mind in a sound body’; also the saying of Svedelli: “It is not intellect nor science nor talent that governs the world, but character. It is not the soul nor the body that shall be educated, but the man—to noble, powerful, and active citizenship. It is the influence of the harmonious individual which brings culture and progress into society, state, and home.”

== Personal life ==
Along with Anna Murray of Stockholm, who was principal of the Chicago Sloyd school, Toppelius resided with a private family in Lake View, Chicago. Toppelius was never free from bodily pain. She died in Chicago on January 27, 1896, and was buried at All Souls Unitarian Church in Chicago.
