= Topelius (surname) =

Topelius is a surname. Notable people with this surname include:

- Toini Topelius (1854–1910), Finnish journalist and writer
- Zachris Topelius (1818–1898), Swedish-speaking Finnish author, poet, journalist, historian, and rector

== See also ==
- Toppelius
