= Uno Cygnaeus =

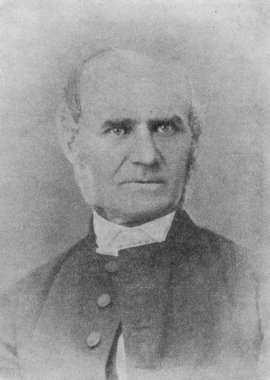
Cygnaeus, c. 1880

Uno Cygnaeus (12 October 1810 in Hämeenlinna – 2 January 1888 in Helsinki) was a Finnish clergyman, educator, and chief inspector of the country's school system. He is considered the father of the Finnish public school system. His accomplishments also include the initiation of high-class teacher training, emphasizing the importance of women's education and most importantly introducing the use of crafts (sloyd – veisto in Finnish, sløyd in Norwegian, slöjd in Swedish, and sløjd in Danish) as a mandatory subject in the school curriculum.

== Early life ==
Cygnaeus was born in Hämeenlinna, Finland, on 12 October 1810. His father died early in Cygnaeus' childhood when he was eight years old. Uno studied natural sciences and theology at the University of Turku and continued in Helsinki when the university moved over to Helsinki. In 1837 he was ordained as a priest and served in Viipuri until 1839. In Viipuri he served as assistant pastor and prison chaplain in addition to teaching at a private school. This experience and his study of the work of the educational philosophers Johann Heinrich Pestalozzi and Friedrich Fröbel led to the formulation of Cygnaeus's own educational philosophy and ideas.

In 1840 he was sent off to Russian America to serve for five years as the first pastor of Sitka Lutheran Church in New Archangel (now Sitka, Alaska) as a punishment for an extramarital affair. This place was a trading post, where Cygnaeus got a chance to observe the barter exchanges between the Europeans and the Native Alaskans. Upon his return, he spent twelve years as a superintendent of a Finnish parish school in Saint Petersburg.

== Career ==
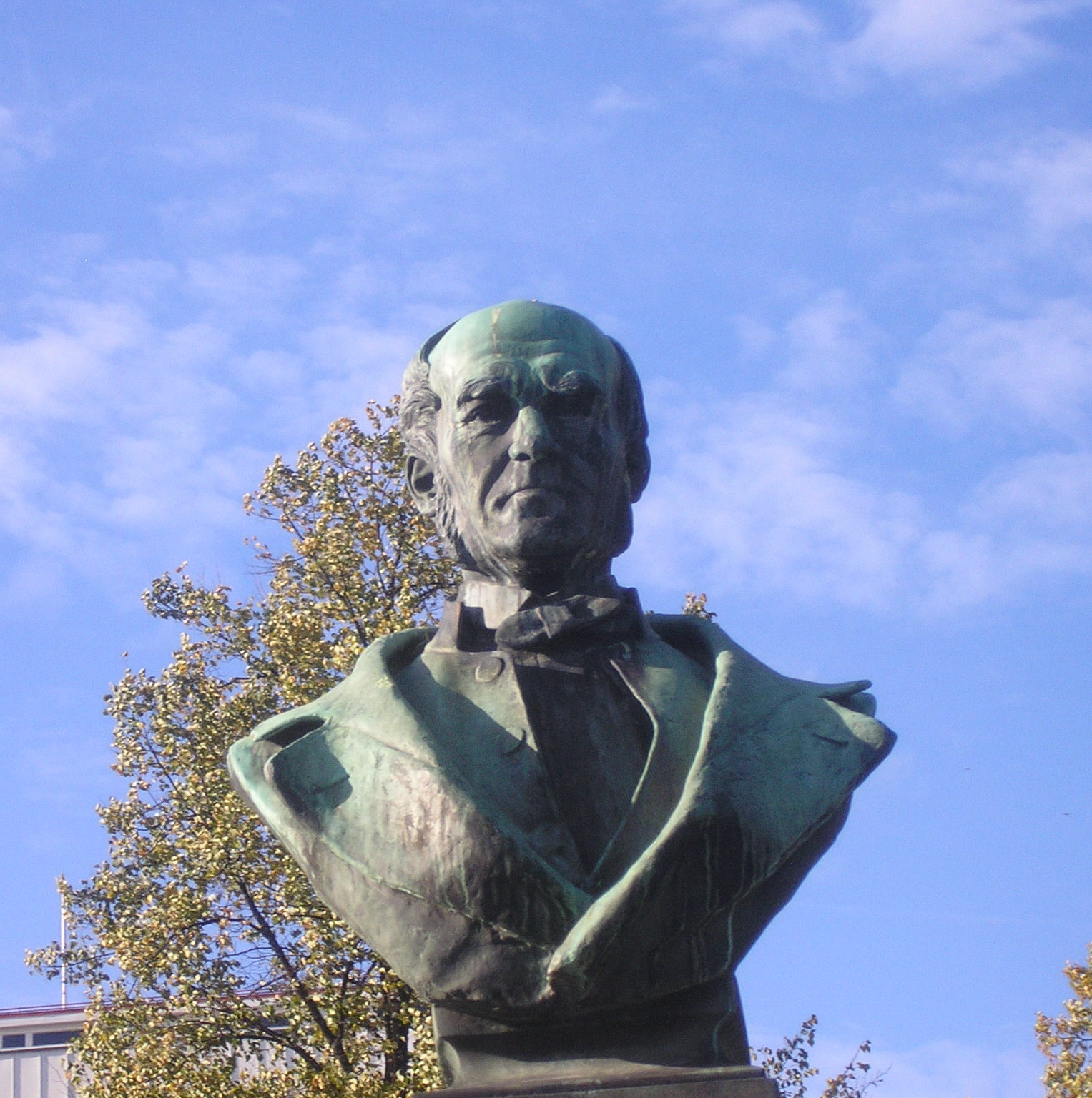
Bust of Cygnaeus.

In 1855 the Russian senate was commissioned to advance the educational system in Finland after Tsar Alexander II ascended to the throne. The senate collected proposals from different sources. Uno Cygnaeus also sent a proposal which gained the senate's support and Cygnaeus was appointed to develop a folk school system. He travelled via Sweden and Denmark to the German states and to Switzerland to collect information about different educational systems. He was most influenced by the kindergartens in Hamburg and the Swiss school system. Cygnaeus drew up a plan on the basis of notes, which he took during his journeys, and the senate approved his plan in 1861.

Cygnaeus advocated separating schools from the supervision of the church and establishing a teacher training college. Cygnaeus's plan formed the basis for the folk school regulation, which was laid down in 1866. The sloyd system became compulsory for boys in all rural schools (as it still is all over the country as of 2007) and for all male teachers in teacher training institutions. Students learned about metals, about fabrication techniques, about selecting appropriate wood samples from the forests, about the care necessary for working with materials and finally the need for collaborative efforts to accomplish tasks. Sweden adopted these ideas a few years after Finland. A sloyd training school was set up in Nääs, Sweden in the 1870s by Otto Salomon. Thousands of teachers from all over the world attended classes at Nääs. Some of the countries in which sloyd was successfully introduced were the UK, the US, Japan, Brazil, Argentina, Cuba, and the Scandinavian countries. Currently, sloyd is still part of the compulsory school curriculum in Finland, Sweden and Norway.

The influence of Cygnaeus also reached the United States (Bennet 1937) when Larsson, trained by Otto Salomon, moved to the U.S. and founded the Boston Sloyd School in 1888. This institution is still regarded as an important step in American technological education (Phillips 1985). The views of the American educator John Dewey were based on then-current global trends, one of the most important one being the sloyd movement begun by Cygnaeus. D.W. Olson, the first American researcher writing about technology education, values Cygnaeus quite highly.

Finnish general education still has educative handicraft (käsityö) as a school subject. It is divided into two separate subjects: textile work (tekstiilityö) and technical work (tekninen työ). They are taught as compulsory subjects from the third grade of primary education. Students can choose either tekninen työ or tekstiilityö.

From 1863 until 1869, Cygnaeus served, besides being a chief inspector of the country's school system, as the director of a Finnish seminary at Jyväskylä. After that he returned to full-time job as chief inspector and from 1870 to 1887 he was also a member of the supreme board of education.

== Death ==
Cygnaeus died on 2 January 1888 in Helsinki, Finland.

== Family ==
His cousin, Fredrik Cygnaeus, was a Swedish-language poet.
