= Sloyd =

System of handicraft-based education

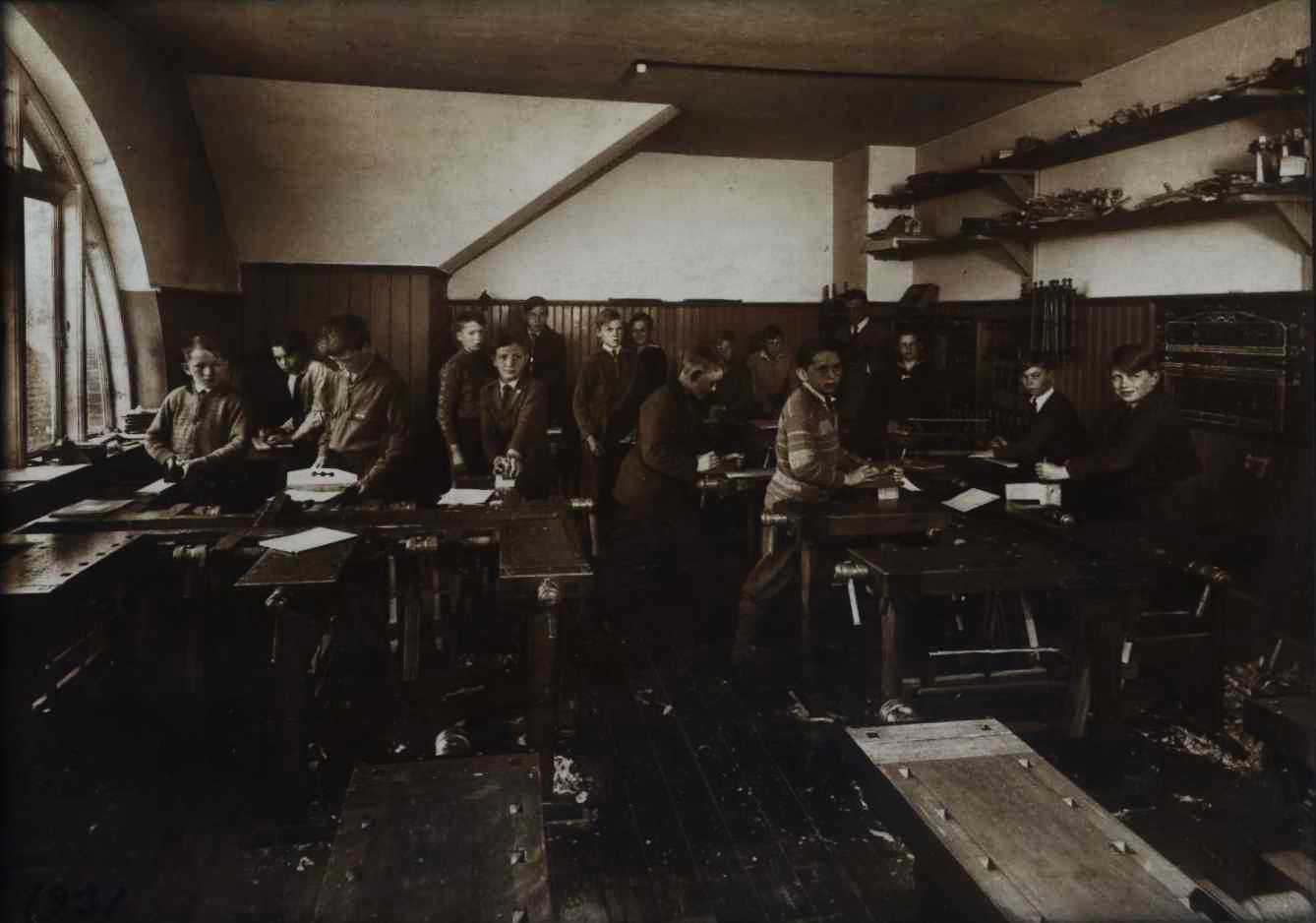
Woodwork room for teaching sloyd in Denmark, 1931

Sloyd (Swedish: Slöjd), also known as educational sloyd, is a system of handicraft-based education started by Uno Cygnaeus in Finland in 1865. The system was further refined and promoted worldwide, and was taught in the United States until the early 20th century. It is still taught as a compulsory subject in Finnish, Danish, Swedish and Norwegian schools.

== Historical overview ==
=== Background ===
The word sloyd is derived from the Swedish word slöjd, which translates as crafts, handicraft, or handiwork. It refers primarily to woodwork but also paper-folding and sewing, embroidery, knitting and crochet.

Otto Salomon, with the financial support of his uncle, started a school for teachers on the Nääs estate (now a part of the Swedish municipality of Lerum) in the 1870s. The school attracted students from throughout the world and was active until around 1960.

Educational sloyd's purpose was formative in that it was thought that the benefits of handicrafts in general education built the character of the child, encouraging moral behavior, greater intelligence, and industriousness. Sloyd had a noted impact on the early development of manual training, manual arts, industrial education, and technical education.

=== Sloyd in Sweden ===
Sloyd (slöjd) has been a Swedish school subject since the 1870s and compulsory since 1955. In the present national curriculum for Swedish elementary schools, students have classes in slöjd every semester, normally between the ages of nine and fifteen.

In most schools, the course is still divided traditionally into two parts: soft materials (textiles) and hard materials (woodwork and metalwork). Each semester, students switch between the two different classrooms. Differences in what kind of tasks are selected, and how the subject-specific content is handled, depending on the teacher's training.

The present aims of the slöjd curriculum in Sweden are to give pupils the opportunity to develop:

- the ability to create and design products in different materials with the help of appropriate materials and tools
- the ability to develop ideas, as well as choose and motivate their approach in keeping with the intention of the work
- the ability to reflect over processes and results, bearing in mind considerations of quality, expression and sustainability

In other words, the subject of slöjd in Swedish schools aims to develop the student's practical knowledge, and their ability to solve practical problems through knowledge of different working processes, as well as how to evaluate the results of their own work during the production process by trying out different ways to handle specific tools or materials or by choosing alternative tools and materials.

=== Sloyd in America ===
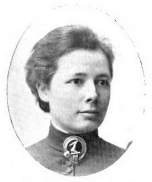
Meri Toppelius

Born in Finland, Meri Toppelius was the first to introduce the sloyd system in the United States.

The major points of sloyd introduction in the United States were Gustaf Larsson's Sloyd Teacher Training School, which was housed on the fourth floor of the North Bennet Street Industrial School (now the North Bennet Street School) in Boston, and at the Baron de Hirsch Trade School in NYC.

Of the sloyd system, North Bennet Street Industrial School's annual report from the school year 1908–1909 had the following to say:

The North Bennet Street Industrial School came into being in 1880 as an answer to the question thus stated in the first annual report: 'Might we not train these unskilled masses, and thus create a demand for them and their labor?' Throughout its history, the school has had a single aim—social betterment by means of such education as shall increase efficiency and respect for labor... Indeed, it is largely due to the work started here and developed through the Sloyd Training School that manual training has become the inheritance of children over our entire country.

That same annual report goes on to say that "The Sloyd Training School, for many years occupying the fourth floor, was given a new building on Harcourt Street, the growth and demands upon the school has increased to such an extent as made the old quarters entirely inadequate. The implication is that the teachings were further absorbed into the Boston educational system.

Gustaf Larsson wrote a number of books about sloyd and sloyd education, and B.B. Hoffmann, principal of the Baron De Hirsch Trade School, also published an important text. Ednah Anne Rich, a graduate of Gustaf Larsson's school in Boston and of the Sloyd Training School at Nääs started Sloyd teacher training in Santa Barbara. In a few years, sloyd was being taught in hundreds of schools throughout the US.

== Principles ==
=== Developmental goal ===
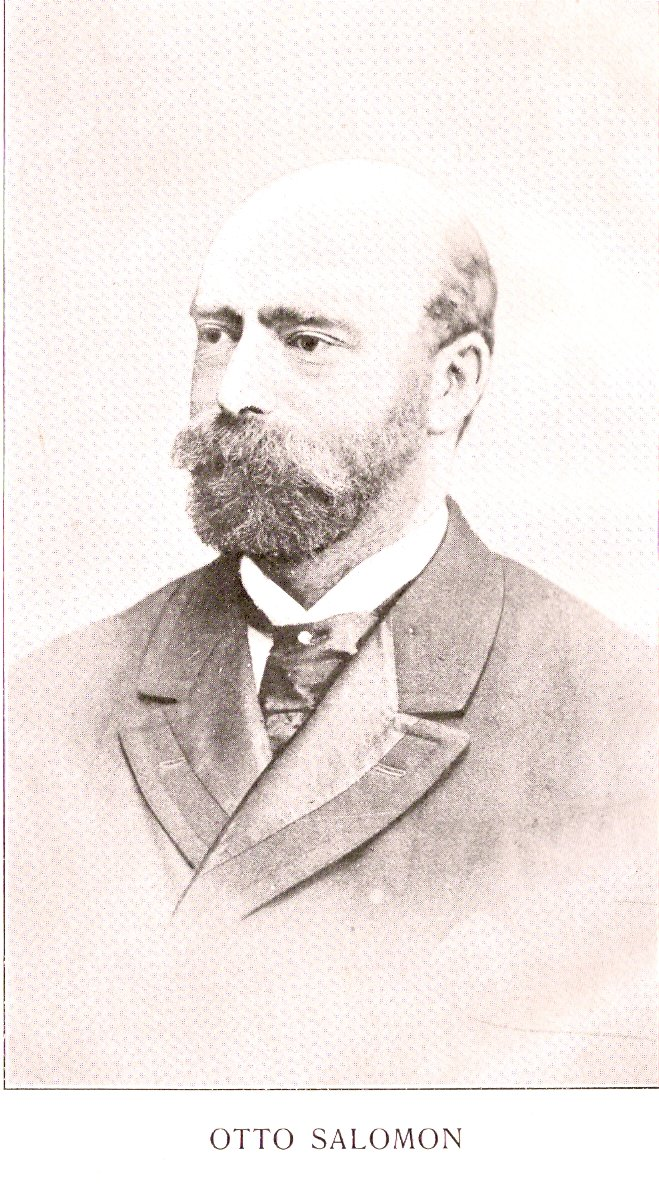
Otto Salomon

In educational sloyd, as devised by Otto Salomon in the 1870s, woodworking projects were designed to build incrementally on the child's growing skill. This was accomplished by making the projects grow in the degree of difficulty over a period of time, through the introduction of the complexity of shape and procedures, and through the gradual introduction of more difficult woodworking tools. Salomon believed that the teacher should carefully study and know each child. It was said that from the student's perspective, no project should be any more difficult than the immediately preceding project. Sloyd was taught through the use of series of models, growing in difficulty and complexity that the students were supposed to accurately reproduce without interference from the teacher. Salomon developed exercises in the use of various tools leading to proficiency in the making of models. The exercises in the use of various tools were developed through a careful study by Salomon, but he also encouraged that model series be adapted and made relevant to the various cultures in which sloyd was taught. The objects in the model series were designed to be useful to the child and his family, thereby building a relationship of goodwill and mutual support in the child's education.

"Paper sloyd," in particular, was intended as a preparation for woodworking and sewing, which were considered more difficult work appropriate for older students. The book Paper Sloyd for Primary Grades suggests that the craft's benefits for the student included the following: "Observation is quickened; eyes are trained to see right lines and distances, thus aiding in free-hand drawing and writing; while the hand and wrist muscles, being used for a definite purpose, unconsciously become obedient assistants."

Paper sloyd consisted of paper folding which resembles the Japanese art of origami, but involves more cutting and gluing. Projects might include folding a case for a comb or whiskbroom, a box for candies or pencils, pinwheels, a "match scratcher," a blotting-pad, or a penwiper.

=== Unique characteristics ===
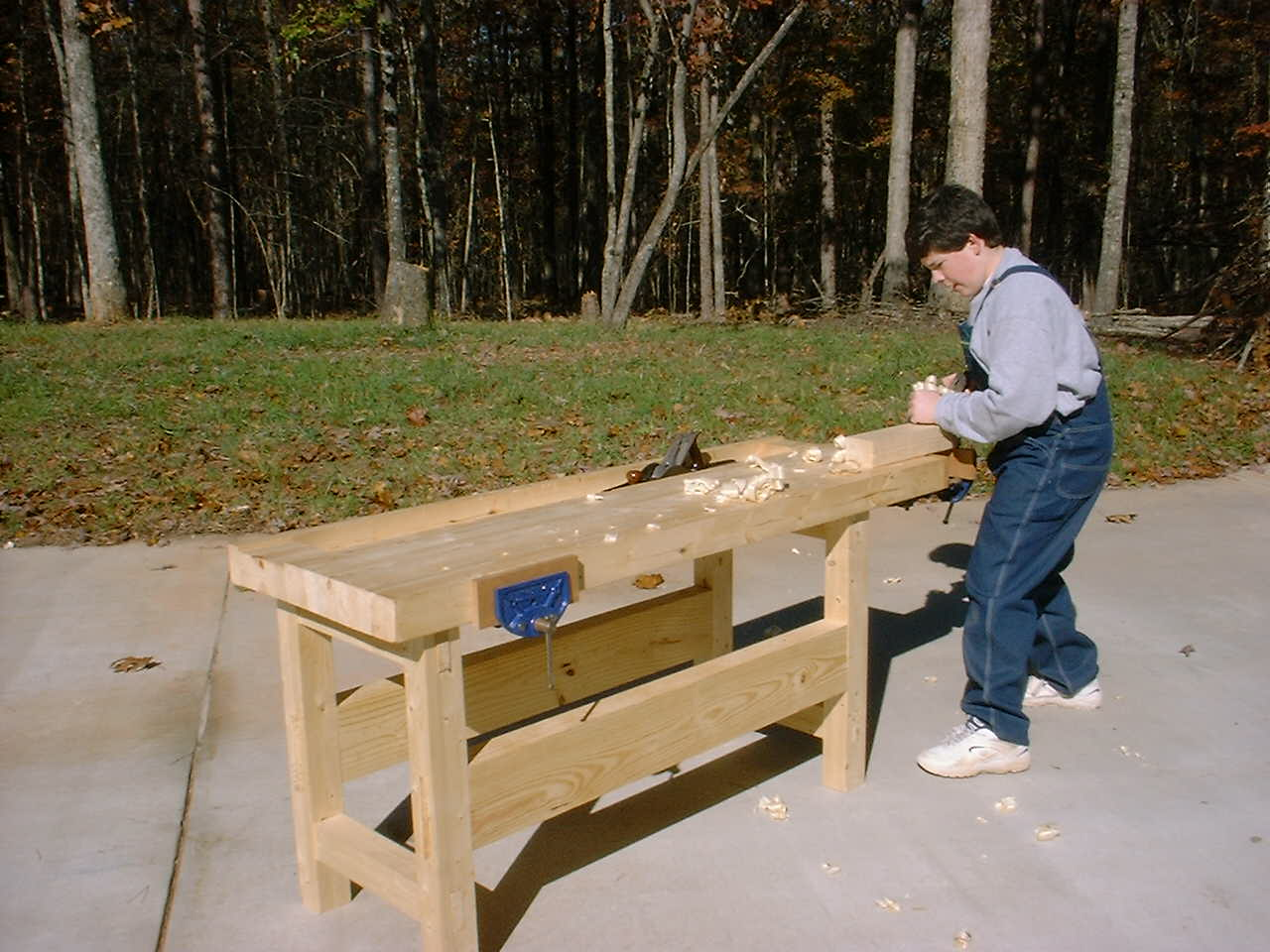

Sloyd differed from other forms of manual training in its adherence to a set of distinct pedagogical principles. These were: that instruction should move from the known to the unknown, from the easy to the more difficult, from the simple to the more complex, from the concrete to the abstract, and the products made in sloyd should be practical in nature and build the relationship between home and school. Sloyd, unlike its major rival, the "Russian system" promoted by Victor Della-Vos, was designed for general rather than vocational education.

Educational sloyd as practiced in Sweden started with the use of the knife. The knife was controversial when sloyd was first introduced in the UK. Educators in London and the other cities of the UK could hardly imagine putting knives in the hands of the juveniles. They developed a rationale for the use of chisels instead. Salomon's purpose in the use of the knife was that it illustrates a fundamental premise. During the time of sloyd's invention and introduction in rural Sweden, nearly every boy growing up on a farm was already experienced in the use of the knife and knew how to use it without endangering himself or others. Starting with the known and moving toward the unknown was a crucial element of Salomon's theory. He also believed that beauty of form was more readily available through the use of the knife.

Salomon believed that of all the basic crafts, woodworking best fit general educational purposes. Because most schools would not be able to afford to introduce a wide variety of crafts to their students, the overall needs of education would be best served through woodworking sloyd. He adhered rigidly to this plan, and it was not until his death that textile and metal sloyd was added to the teacher training at Nääs. It was also clear to Salomon that mastery of a single craft was more important than a cursory exploration of several crafts that did not offer the student the opportunity of reaching a point of mastery.

Unlike woodworking education of the later years in the US, woodworking sloyd was introduced in the primary grades for the greatest benefit to the child's growing intellect. This was in contrast to the Russian system devised by Victor Della-Vos, which was intended as a vocational system to help prepare students for employment in industry. The distinctions between the two systems were greater than perceived by many. Both used a series of models, but the Russian system used only parts of things rather than finished objects. Salomon's system was based firmly on his study of a long line of educational philosophers like Rousseau, Pestalozzi, Fröbel, Commenius and others. Teacher training at Nääs involved extensive lectures in the fundamental theory of education. Salomon believed that teaching was an art in itself, and that woodworking skills were of secondary importance in the teaching of sloyd. Of various educational theorists, sloyd is most closely associated with Fröbel. Hand & Eye, an educational journal published in England from about 1890–1902, was dedicated to joint discussion of the principles of "Froebelian education" and educational sloyd.

=== Relationship to physical education ===
As Salomon was a great believer in physical education, training teachers in games as part of the basic curriculum. In fact, the school at Nääs was the point of introduction of basketball to Europe, with the game being brought to the school by students from the US. Salomon also believed that woodworking was a means for physical development. He drew a distinction between the posture of the carpenter and the proper posture for use in sloyd.

== Legacy ==
Salomon kept up a regular correspondence with former students all over the world, spoke in several languages, and delivered his lectures on alternate days in Swedish, English, and German. He was not as good in English – but he practiced in his lessons and conversations during the summer courses. "My English is always better in the autumn", he said as a joke.

Thousands of teachers from all over the world attended classes at Nääs. Some of the countries in which sloyd was successfully introduced were the UK, the US, Japan, Brazil, Argentina, Cuba, the Scandinavian countries, and many more.

== Today ==
Currently, sloyd is still part of the compulsory school curriculum in Finland, Sweden, Denmark, and Norway. In Sweden, students take part in wood, metal and textile sloyd, and are given one grade that covers their proficiency in the subject as a whole, in Denmark all three materials are compulsory as individual subjects, and in Norway, they are united into one subject called forming. In Iceland, sloyd pedagogy is the basis for the Icelandic Design and Craft school curriculum.

While sloyd disappeared from the American educational landscape in the early 1900s, articles have been published by Doug Stowe in Woodwork Magazine, August 2004 and again in August 2005, and by Joe Barry in the Journal of the American Period Furniture Makers, September 2004, Volume IV.

Roy Underhill gives a 30-minute presentation from The Book of Sloyd on The Woodwright's Shop on PBS.

In 2019, a non-profit organization called Sloyd Experience was established in Boulder County, Colorado. According to the organization's website, its mission is "to strengthen children's character through woodworking, where our sole aim is to foster self-reliance, nurture concentration, coach perseverance, encourage neatness, and instill an appreciation for labor – all of which will prepare them for their future." Sloyd Experience advertises itself as reviving sloyd education and philosophy in the United States and working to provide this authentic, hands on education in communities across the country in an equitable and accessible way.

== See also ==
- Duodji
