= Efterskole =

Type of school in Denmark

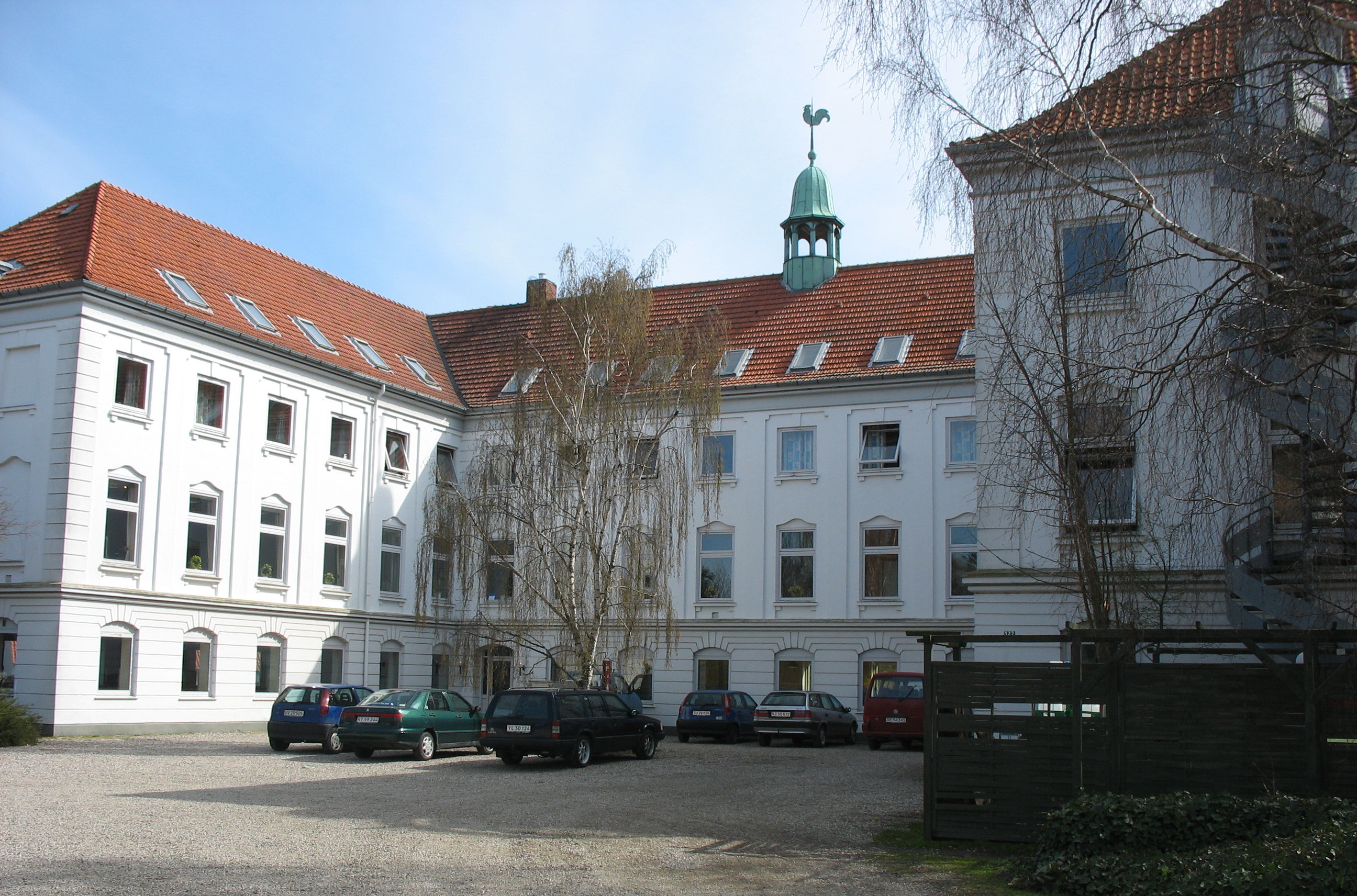
Odsherreds Efterskole

An efterskole (literally "afterschool", plural efterskoler) is a unique type of Danish voluntary independent residential school for young people between the age of 14 to 18. At an efterskole, students can choose to spend one, two or three years finishing their education, and currently some 28,500 students attend one of approximately 260 such schools throughout Denmark. The schools are open to students from abroad.

An efterskole usually offers a variety of "study lines", focusing on specific themes, such as general sports, association football, sailing, golf, cooking, media, animation, theatre, music, dance, etc. Those particular lines offers practice and training on a professional level. Some schools also focus on helping pupils with dyslexia, or other educational issues.

== Idea and organization ==
=== Common educational purpose ===
Each efterskole is a self-governing independent institution, and they all deal with both the educational and personal development of the students. They embrace a common educational focus on Enlightenment values, general education and democratic citizenship.

=== Freedom of the efterskoler ===
Compared to public schools, efterskoler have substantial freedom in terms of e.g. choice of subjects, teaching methods and educational approach. These vary in accordance with individual school's political, religious or pedagogical orientation. The freedom of the efterskoler is assured by substantial state subsidies to both schools and students.

== History ==
The first efterskoler were founded in the 1870s. The schools were closely related to the Danish Folk High School and the educational ideas of Christen Kold (1816-1870) and N. F. S. Grundtvig (1783–1872) who wanted schools to impart enlightenment values rather than formal vocational training.

The Danish efterskoler came to play an important role for the Danish-oriented residents of the Danish-German borderland of Schleswig when Germany introduced a law for language schools in 1888. To secure qualified teaching in Danish language and culture, the residents were forced to send their children to efterskoler in Denmark. The first efterskole in the region of Southern Jutland was built in 1919. The attendance rate – from the Danish minority of Southern Schleswig especially – increased dramatically during the 1920s, when Germany experienced political extremism and economic meltdown. After World War II in 1945, the attendance rate from the region increased once again. The German minority of the region also has a dedicated efterskole in Tinglev, founded in 1951. After a general declining attendance rate from the 1950s onwards in the region and countrywide, a renewed interest in efterskoler took hold in the 1990s.

After a period of stagnation and sometimes decreasing number of students in modern times, efterskoler have seen an increase in popularity in the last two decades or so, now with an increased focus on the natural sciences and international affairs. Currently, two out of three students at efterskoler attend the 10th grade; the rest attend 8th or 9th grade. This development has been criticised by the corporate confederation of Dansk Industri (DI) as a "waste of money" because of the state subsidies involved.

In the first decade of the 2000s, the cost of attending an efterskole rose by 75%, and this development has been a matter of concern in Denmark. The prices for one year at an efterskole range from roughly 20,000 to more than 80,000 kroner.

== Sources ==
- Raahede, Uffe: Grundtvig, Efterskolen og Medborgerskabet. Forlaget-Aerligtalt, (2006), ISBN 87-989950-2-2 (in Danish)
- Efterskoleforeningen. Official homepage of the national association of "efterskoler" in Denmark (in Danish)
- Efterskole - About the Danish efterskole. Efterskoleforeningen.
- "Kort om efterskoler ["Efterskoler" in brief]" (in Danish). The Danish Ministry of Education. 23 August 2014.
- "Spørgsmål og svar om efterskoler [Questions and answers about "efterskoler"]" (in Danish). The Danish Ministry of Education. 10 May 2013.
- Educations: "Efterskoler" (in Danish). The Danish Ministry of Education. 2 January 2014.
- Minister of Education Christine Antorini (13 August 2014). "Bekendtgørelse af lov om efterskoler, husholdningsskoler og håndarbejdsskoler [Decree of the law on "efterskoler", schools for housekeeping and schools for handicraft]". retsinformation.dk (in Danish). The Department of Civil Affairs.
