= Nääs Castle =

Mansion near Gothenburg, Sweden

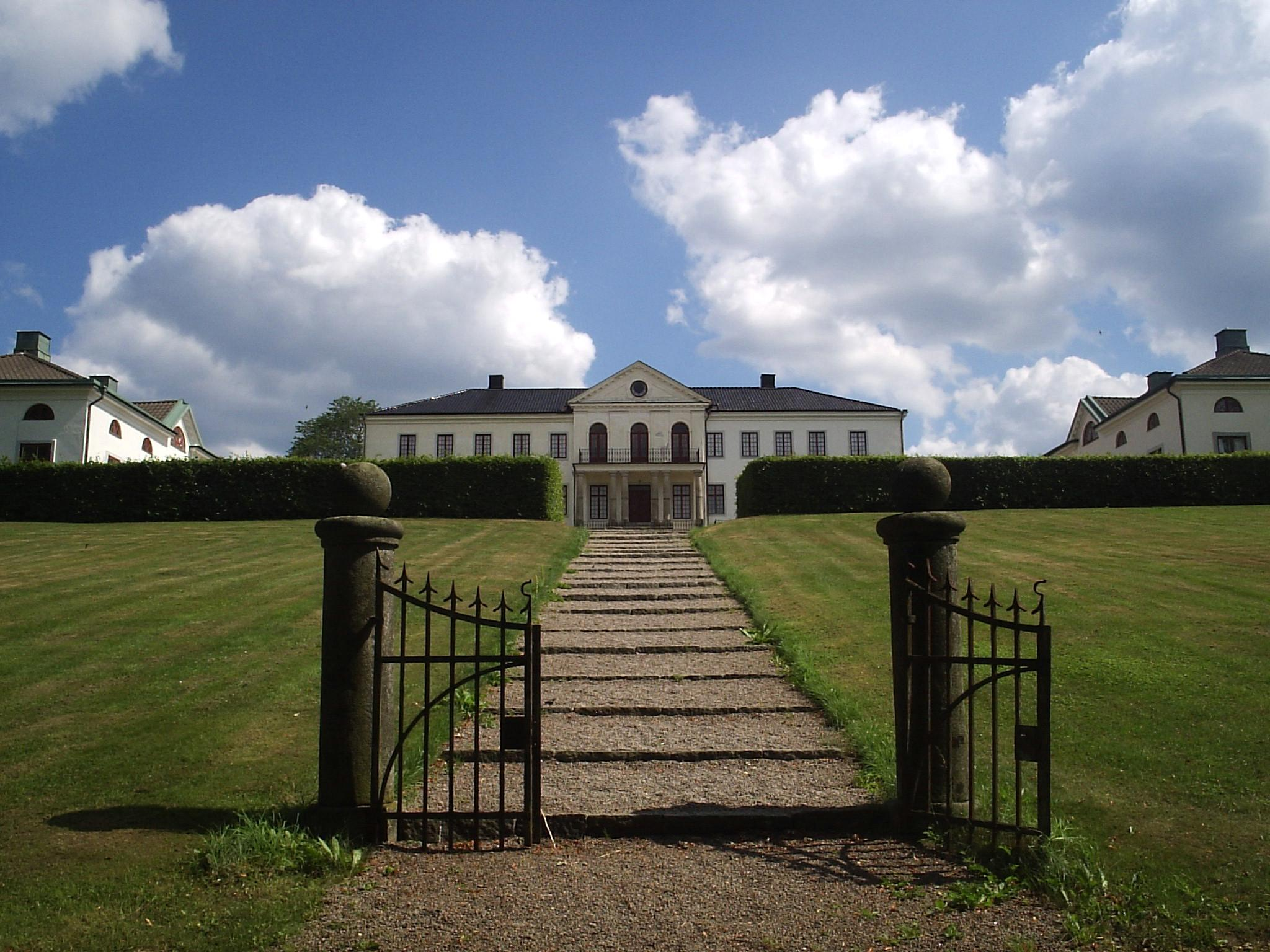
Nääs

Nääs Castle is a 17th-century mansion near Gothenburg, Sweden. It is situated by Sävelången Lake in Västergötland.

In the latter half of the 19th century, Nääs became known for its craft college, and for more than 50 years it was regarded as 'Sweden's window to the world'.

Nääs Castle is located on the Nääs Estate by Sävelången Lake in Västergötland, Sweden, east of Floda, Lerum Municipality, Skallsjö parish. Nääs Estate is widely renowned for its craft education during the late 19th century and the early 20th century.

The official spelling for geographical map productions is Näs (KML 1 kap. 4 §).

== Nääs Castle and the craft college ==
The main building on the cultural heritage site of Nääs Estate, Nääs Castle, is now a museum open to the public, daily between May and September (guided tours only), and for pre-booked group visit outside the tourist season.

The estate consists of a number of historic buildings open to the public. In addition to a restaurant, café, art & crafts shop and west Sweden’s very own heritage foundation, byggnadsvård Nääs, a range of public events are organized each year. Art and craft courses are still provided in one of the buildings, albeit to a lesser extent.

The old stable is now home to a horse riding school and Nääs Equestrian Association. In addition to several nature and walking trails, Nääs Estate also provides bed and breakfast and conference accommodations. During the summer, several craft courses are held at Slöjdseminariet, the crafts college's official building.

Nääs Castle and Craft College is administered and maintained by the August Abrahamsons Foundation, a Swedish government administration.

== Owners of Nääs Estate ==
According to legend, Kristian II built a castle for hunting parties at Näs. The first historical evidence of Nääs Estate however, derives from title deeds dated 3 October 1529. The first known owner, Joen Småswen, constructed a large manor on the promontory in Lake Savelången. At the end of the 16th century the estate was owned by the governor of west Sweden, Göran Eriksson Ulfsparre. It was subsequently owned by Ulfsparres family members and the noble families Lilliehöök, Natt och Dag, Cronsköld, Oxenstierna, Göthenstierna, von Utfall and Reenstierna.

In 1824, the estate was sold to Peter Wilhelm Berg, a wholesaler from Gothenburg. After his death, the property was divided between his surviving children (only three of his ten children survived childhood). Berg’s son Theodor and his daughter Nensy were allotted Nääs factories (Nääs fabriker). The youngest son, Gottfrid, received the rest of the estate, including the mansion. A memorial stone to the seven dead brothers and sisters was erected in the castle gardens on the northern side of the mansion.

In 1868, the mansion and its associated land was sold to August Abrahamson, another wholesaler from Gothenburg. Abrahamson founded the famous craft college and donated the entire property to the state after his death in 1897.

In 1898, Nääs Castle and the craft workshop were owned and managed by the August Abrahamson Foundation. The foundation was formed under a will on April 7, 1898 by August Abrahamson to secure the continuity of the Nääs handicraft teacher seminary at the property Nääs in Skallsjö, Västra Götaland. "The foundation consists of the property Nääs and in addition, donated properties, salaries, salaries and cash". The foundation thus manages around 60 buildings and approximately 1,500 hectares of land.

The foundation has two main purposes: to preserve Nääs as a site of cultural heritage, and to promote the survival of craftsmanship: The foundation shall preserve and revitalize Nääs by managing, caring for and preserving the property's internal and external environments and giving the public access to the property and the activities carried out there. The foundation shall promote the survival of craftsmanship through activities on the property that educate, collect, maintain and disseminate knowledge, collaborate within research and development, and create the right conditions for craftsmen to practice their profession.
