= Otto Salomon =

Swedish educational theorist (1849–1907)

Otto Aron Salomon
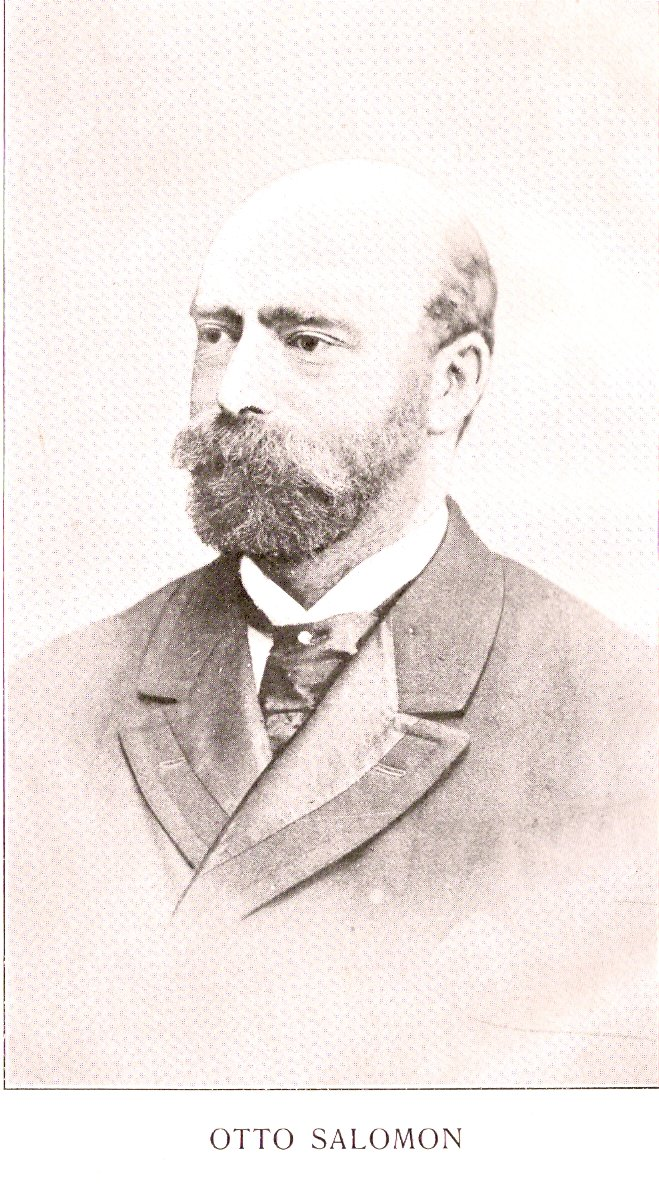
- Born: 1849; Gothenburg, Sweden
- Died: 1907 (aged 57–58)
- Other name: Otto Salomon

Otto Aron Salomon (1849–1907) was a Swedish educator and both a noted writer and proponent of educational sloyd. Born in Gothenburg, Sweden in 1849, Salomon studied at the Institute of Technology in Stockholm but left after a year to accept a position as Director of the Sloyd Teachers Seminary in Nääs, Sweden. It was while at the seminary that Salomon was able to popularize the educational sloyd movement.

== Bibliography ==
- The Slöjd in the Service of the School (1888)
