= Evil Queen (Disney) =

Main antagonist of Disney's Snow White and the Seven Dwarfs

The Evil Queen
- Snow White and the Seven Dwarfs character
- The Evil Queen in both forms from the 1937 film
- First appearance: Snow White and the Seven Dwarfs (1937)
- Created by: Art Babbitt (animation); Walt Disney & Joe Grant (design)
- Based on: The Evil Queen by Brothers Grimm
- Voiced by: Lucille La Verne (1937 film); Paula Winslowe (1938 radio); Gloria Gordon (as Old Hag, 1938 radio); Jeanette Nolan (1945 radio); Eleanor Audley (1949 audiobook, 1953 radio); June Foray (Disney on Parade); Ginny Tyler (as Old Hag, Snow White's Enchanted Wish); Janet Waldo (1974 Christmas album); Eda Reiss Merin (1990 Disney Read-Along); Louise Chamis (1992–2001); Susan Silo (1994–1995); Susanne Blakeslee (2001–present); Tress MacNeille (as Old Hag, The Wonderful World of Mickey Mouse, Welcome to the Club, The Most Wonderful Time of the Year)
- Portrayed by: Anne Francine (musical); Charles Edward Hall (as Old Hag, musical); Jane Curtin (TV special); Various (Disney on Ice); Kathy Najimy (Descendants); Gal Gadot (Snow White)

In-universe information
- Aliases: Wicked Queen, Queen Grimhilde, Old Witch, Wicked Witch, Witch Queen, Queen-witch, Old Hag, Snow White's stepmother
- Occupation: Sorceress, queen dowager/regnant
- Affiliation: Disney Villains
- Spouse: The King
- Children: Snow White (stepdaughter); Evie (daughter in Descendants)
- Relatives: The Prince (stepson-in-law, sequel stories)

The Evil Queen, also known as the Wicked Queen, Queen Grimhilde, Evil Stepmother, or just the Queen, is a fictional character who appears in Walt Disney Productions' first animated feature film Snow White and the Seven Dwarfs (1937) as its main antagonist and remains a villain character in their extended Snow White franchise. She is based on the Evil Queen character from the 1812 German fairy tale "Snow White".

The Evil Queen is a cold, sadistic, cruel, and extremely vain individual, owning a magic mirror solely for her obsessive and narcissistic desire to remain the "fairest in the land". She becomes madly envious over the beauty of her stepdaughter, Princess Snow White, as well as the attentions of the Prince from another land; this love triangle element is one of Disney's changes to the story. This leads her to plot the death of Snow White and ultimately on the path to her own demise, which in the film is indirectly caused by the Seven Dwarfs. The film's version of the Queen character uses her dark magic powers to actually transform herself into an old woman instead of just taking a disguise like in the Grimms' story; this appearance of hers is commonly referred to as the Wicked Witch or alternatively as the Old Hag or just the Witch in the stepmother's disguised form. The Queen dies in the film, but lives on in a variety of non-canonical Disney works.

The film's version of the Queen was created by Walt Disney and Joe Grant, and originally animated by Art Babbitt and voiced by Lucille La Verne. Inspiration for her facial features came from Joan Crawford, Greta Garbo, and Marlene Dietrich. Her wardrobe design came from the characters of Queen Hash-a-Motep from She and Princess Kriemhild from Die Nibelungen. The Queen has since been voiced by Paula Winslowe, Jeanette Nolan, Eleanor Audley, June Foray, Ginny Tyler, Janet Waldo and Susanne Blakeslee, among others, and was portrayed live by Anne Francine (musical), Jane Curtin (50th anniversary TV special), Olivia Wilde (Disney Dream Portraits), Kathy Najimy (Descendants), and Gal Gadot (Snow White).

This version of the fairy tale character has been very well received by film critics and the public, and is considered one of Disney's most iconic and menacing villains. Besides the film, the Evil Queen has made numerous appearances in Disney attractions and productions, including not only these directly related to the tale of Snow White, such as Fantasmic!, The Kingdom Keepers and Kingdom Hearts Birth by Sleep, sometimes appearing in them alongside Maleficent from Sleeping Beauty. The film's version of the Queen has also become a popular archetype that influenced a number of artists and non-Disney works.

== Snow White and the Seven Dwarfs ==
=== Storyline ===
The Queen in her secret lair in an illustration by the Brothers Hildebrandt.

In "another land, far away," "many, many years ago," about "the time of fairy-tales of castles, knights, fair maidens, romance, magic and witches," a mysterious and icily beautiful woman with magical powers has gained her royal position by marrying the widowed King, giving her rule over his kingdom before he died. The vain Queen owned a magical mirror with which she could look upon whatever she wished. The Magic Mirror shows a haunted, smokey face which replies to Queen's requests. She regularly asks the mirror who is the fairest in the realm and the mirror would always reply that she is. The Queen has magical power only over her own domain, which is the castle.

One day, however, the mirror tells her that there is a new fairest woman in the land, her stepdaughter, Princess Snow White. She became obsessively jealous of the princess' emerging beauty, therefore turning her into a scullery maid in her own home. After observing the handsome young prince named Florian from another kingdom singing a love song to Snow White, the proud Queen falls in a jealous rage. She commands her faithful Huntsman to take the princess deep into the woods and kill her. He is also ordered to bring back her heart in a box to prove that he had done so. But the Huntsman cannot bear to kill the young princess upon seeing her innocence, so he tells Snow White of Queen's plot and tells her to run away and never to come back. To escape the penalty, he comes back with a pig's heart and gives it to the Queen. When she questions her mirror, it again replies that Snow White is the fairest in the land, and that she lives at the remote cottage of the Seven Dwarfs, revealing that the box contains the heart of a pig. The Dwarfs, too, are frightened of the Queen's black magic and fear she would kill them all, but they decided to take in Snow White anyway.

The Witch offering a poisoned apple to Snow White in Gustaf Tenggren's inspirational art

Furious that the Huntsman tricked her, the Queen decides that Snow White shall die by her own hand and at any cost. She goes down the dungeon to her secret room where she practices her dark magic, and in desperation uses her spellbook and cauldron to make a potion that transforms her into a hag. The recipe calls it a peddler disguise as she gathers its ingredients like mummy dust to make her old, the black of night to shroud her clothes, the old hag's cackle to age her voice, the scream of fright to whiten her hair, a breath of wind to fan her hate, and a thunderbolt to mix it well. Her beauty is shrouded in ugliness and age upon ingesting the potion, though presumably reversible. She then conjures a poison apple, which will cause "the Sleeping Death", and leaves the castle. She is sure that no one would know or perform the counter-curse to her spell, and believes the Dwarfs would bury her rival alive, thinking her dead. The Queen comes to the cottage and finds Snow White baking a pie for Grumpy the dwarf as she passes herself off as a traveling peddler. Snow White's forest animal friends feel there is something wrong about this strange old woman. After an unsuccessful attempt to warn Snow White by attacking the Queen, they hurry to warn the Dwarfs of the Queen's arrival. Now alone, the Queen successfully tricks the princess into letting her inside the cottage and eating the bewitched apple, telling her that it is a magic wishing apple. Snow White takes a bite of the apple, which puts her in a deep sleep.

The Queen rejoices in her victory, but is soon discovered by the angry Seven Dwarfs and attempts to escape. The Dwarfs, who have lost all fear of her, grab clubs and chase her deep into the forest as a great storm begins. The Queen climbs up into the mountains, where she is trapped upon a precipice that overlooks a seemingly bottomless canyon. She tries to push down a large boulder to crush the approaching vengeful Dwarfs. Just before she can do so, a lightning bolt strikes between her and the boulder, destroying the precipice and sending the Queen (along with the boulder) down the cliff to her death, screaming while she falls to the jagged rocks below. As the Dwarfs look wide-eyed over the cliff's edge, they cannot see her, but the vultures descend into the valley towards the meal they have been waiting for. The Queen's dark reign is over, and her castle is then taken over by the revived Snow White and Florian who broke the spell. (A 1936 pre-release Good Housekeeping novelization by Dorothy Ann Blank, a member of the film's story team, affirms that the Queen in fact dies: "Far below, in a chasm as dark as her own wicked soul, lay the body of the hateful Queen. No magic would ever bring her to life again.")

=== Conception, design and portrayal ===
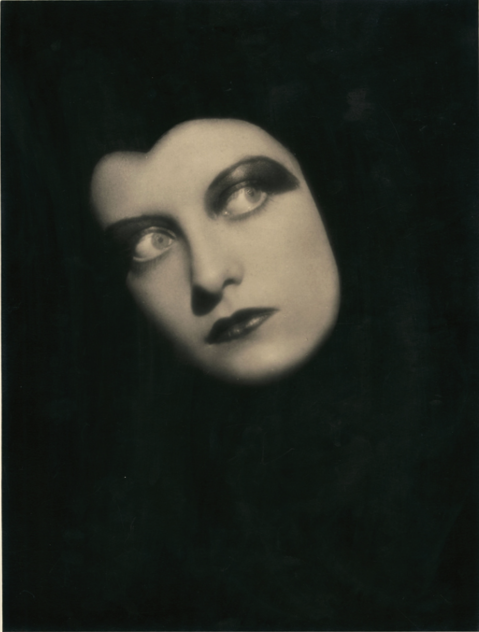
Joan Crawford in 1928

Early concepts for the film called for a "fat, batty, cartoon type, self-satisfied" Evil Queen. However, Walt Disney became concerned that such an approach would make the character seem less plausible. Sensing that more time was needed for the development of the Queen, he advised that attention be paid exclusively to "scenes in which only Snow White, the Dwarfs, and their bird and animal friends appear." Disney further developed the main plot himself (Ollie Johnston said the film's story was based on the idea that the Queen's character was going to murder "another drawing" and Disney decided to make it appear believable), finding a dilemma in the characterization of the Queen, whom he envisioned as a mixture of Lady Macbeth and the Big Bad Wolf, and decided to set on "a high collar stately beautiful type" whose "beauty is sinister, mature, plenty of curves – she becomes ugly and menacing when scheming." According to a description in her card in the Disney Villains set, "the Witch's ugliness symbolises the evil disguised by the Queen's beauty."

The Queen was made to look like both a 1930s femme fatale and a medieval, magical villainess. Her appearance was inspired by Queen Ayesha ("She who must be obeyed"), an "ageless ice goddess" from the 1935 film She, played by Helen Gahagan. The Queen, who originally had the name Grimhilde (but would ultimately remain nameless in the film), was also modeled in part on Kriemhild in the film Die Nibelungen. Her face bears resemblance to American actresses Joan Crawford and Gale Sondergaard, as well as two Hollywood stars from Europe, Greta Garbo and Marlene Dietrich. Her costume and figure may have been based on a column statue at the Naumburg Cathedral depicting Uta von Ballenstedt who was widely regarded as the most beautiful woman of Medieval Germany. Both the Queen and Snow White were refined by Grim Natwick and Norm Ferguson, who would often override Walt Disney's instructions. As in the case of other characters for the film, the Queen's appearance had to be approved by Albert Hurter before being finalised. One pre-final version of the queen had her wear a looser hood and a different crown and the edge of her cape was fur trimmed, as it can be seen in Gustaf Tenggren's pictures.

Unlike much of Disney's animation of human characters in the era, none of Art Babbitt's lead animation work on the character was rotoscoped. The animators were noted to prefer to draw the Queen over Snow White "because she was more real and complex as a woman, more erotic, and driven to desperate acts by her magic mirror." The character, however, turned out to be especially problematic for the animators, as she had to be "regally beautiful, with confined but graceful movements," and "the experiments on her lovely cruel mouth and eyes alone represent drawings enough to fill a paper house." The sequence of her transformation in particular was the film's toughest to visualise using trick effects, especially since Disney insisted on showing how the Queen felt as she changed.

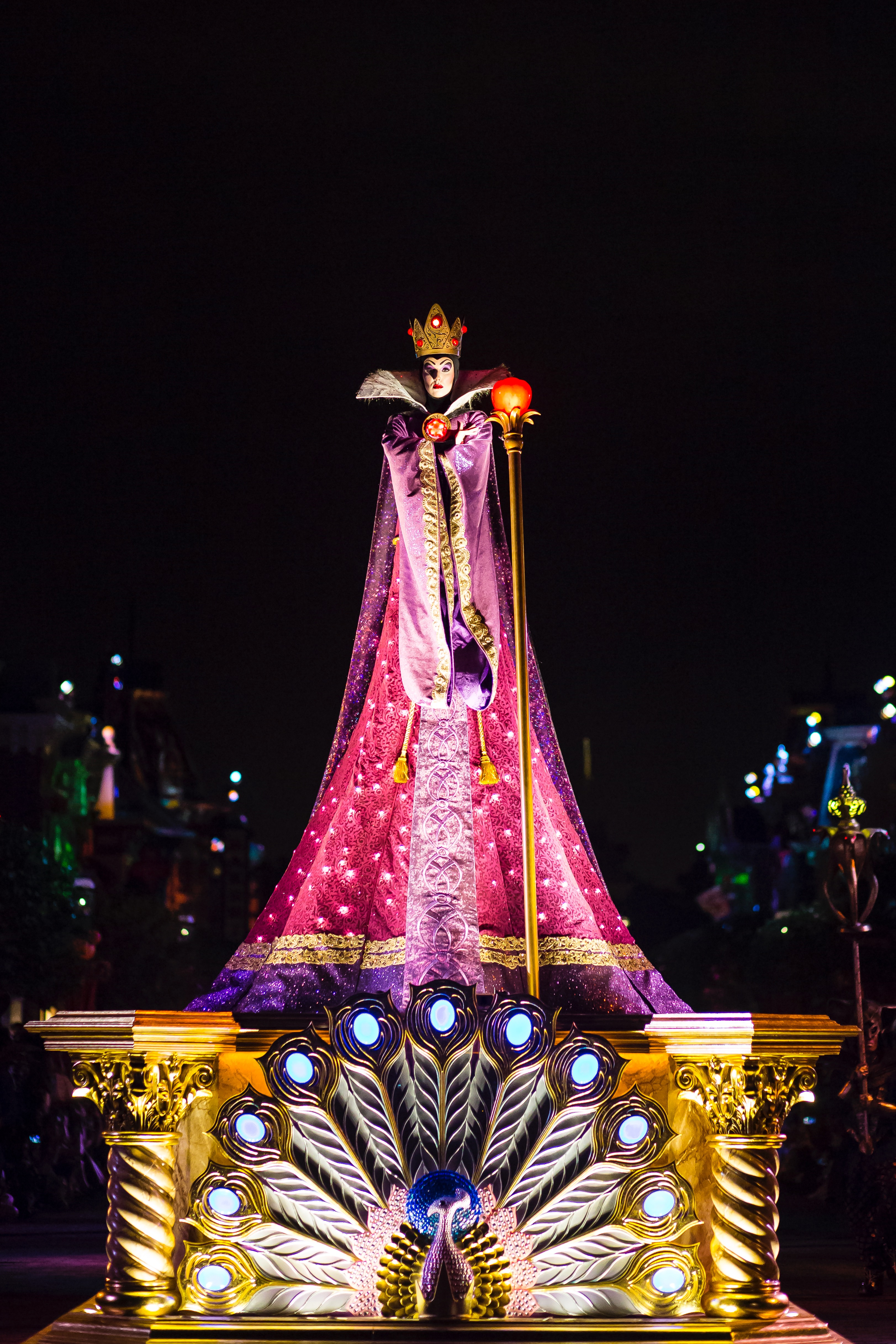
The Evil Queen during Hong Kong Disneyland's Villains Night Out! parade (2016), with the peacock motif prominent

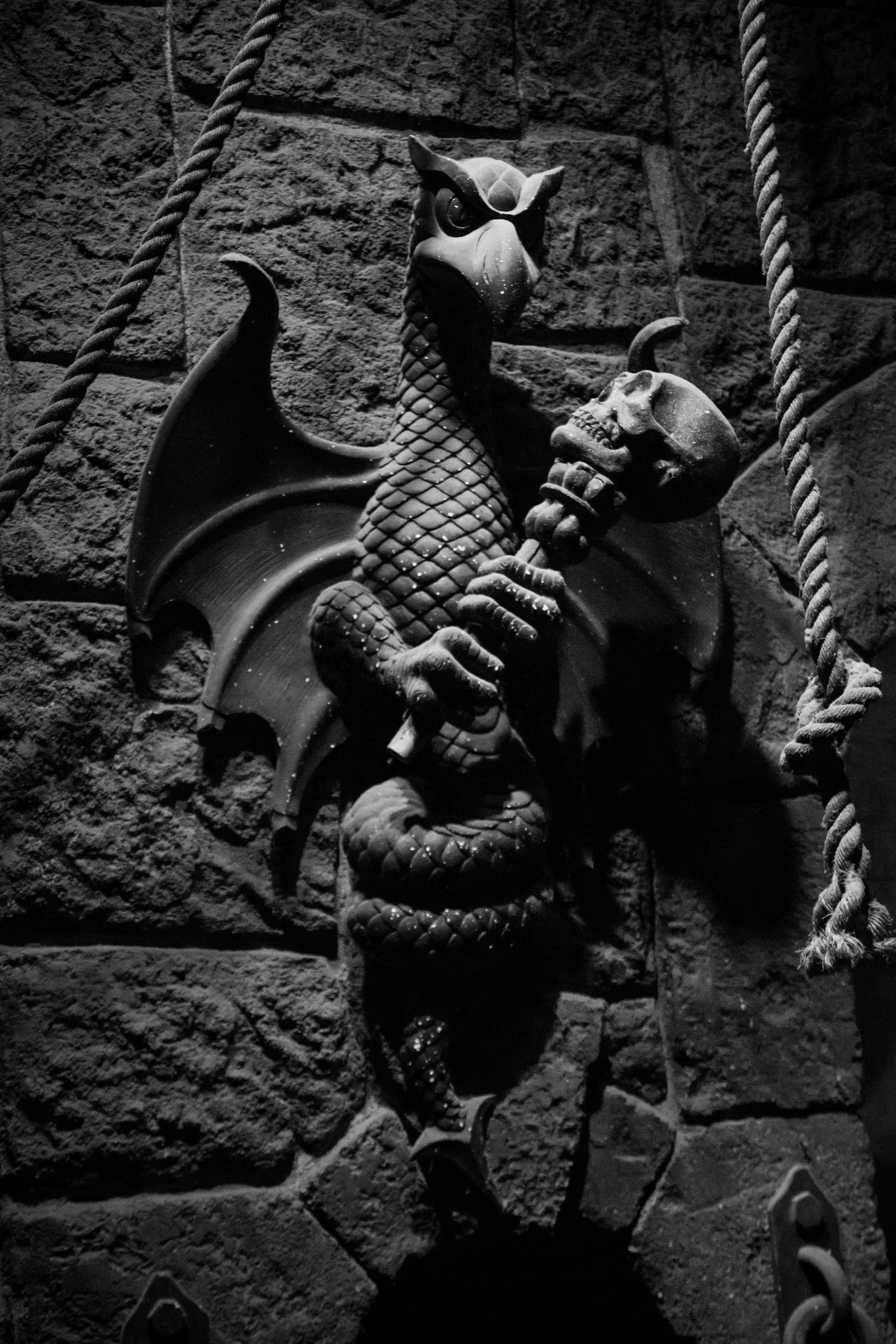
An evil ornament on a wall of the Queen's dungeon in Snow White's Scary Adventures (later Snow White's Enchanted Wish)

Her castle, which had been originally different and less grand in a concept art by Cornett Wood, might have been inspired by Spain's Alcázar of Segovia. Walt Disney wanted the Queen's castle to serve "as a symbol of domestic control and imperial power" and the throne she uses has a peacock motif to symbolise her extreme vanity. The Queen is clad mostly in black and other "negative" dark colors, providing a contrast to Snow White's bright colorful wardrobe, and has "shiny black hair" under her hood. Her royal costume was painted with specially developed paints made to look like satin for her collar and like velvet for her robe. The Queen's music tracks were created with low celio notes, basses, and bassoons; the scribblings in her book of spells were written in Italian. The mysterious entity in her mirror was described as her familiar demon in a press book, but this was never made explicit in the film or any of its adaptations.

The Queen is notably the first character ever to speak in an animated feature film. Lucille La Verne provided the voices of both the Queen and her old hag form, the latter by removing her false teeth. Joe Grant, who contributed the design for her Witch form, noticed La Verne's changing attitude and posture when voicing the Queen and Witch, and sketched these poses and her body language down for animation reference. He also said he based the Witch's concept art on a woman who lived across the street from him.

The Queen was the first character to meet death in a Disney film. As part of elimination of the original story's more gruesome aspects, and to make Snow White seem more a "nice girl", the Evil Queen is no longer cannibalistic and her destruction was made "just as certain but more merciful" than in the original story, where she is forced to dance to her death in red-hot iron shoes on her feet as an invited guest at Snow White's wedding. Snow White's role in the Queen's demise was removed, and the Queen "dies more neatly and quickly," as justice is served without resorting to killing or torture. She also invites her own downfall while pushing the boulder, and her fate is only suggested rather than shown. One of the Witch's animators was Ward Kimball, whom Walt Disney suggested draw the two vultures watching her fall "to make it a little easier" for him, as Kimball had been reassigned after his own sequence was cut from the film, since Disney thought these additional dwarfs gag scenes would distract from "the real drama" of the tension between Snow White and her wicked stepmother that was supposed to drive the film. The film's 1936 press book describes the manner of her death as inspired by what the company fancifully claimed was the Queen's invocation when she had sold her soul to the evil spirits in exchange for her dark powers, supposedly present in "famous folk lore" of German peasants that the Grimms obtained their story from (in what the book claims as a translation to English: "If I had to keep my vow / That I take and swear to now, / May the vultures, wolf and bear / On my body feed and tear / Mock my agony and groans / Rend the red flesh from my bones / Where the dark pine branches wave / Be this wilderness my grave!"). The entire scene might have been also inspired by the lynch mob ending of the 1931 film Frankenstein.

=== Abandoned concepts ===
The original outline of the story featured another attempt by the Queen to kill Snow White, using a poisoned comb, an element taken from the Grimms' version of the tale (the Dwarfs would arrive in time to remove it). The Queen was originally intended to have seven black panthers guarding the entrance to her secret room with the Mirror; a concept art of the Queen walking a pet panther can be seen in The Walt Disney Family Museum and at Disney California Adventure. The tie-in books Snow White: Magic Mirror Book and The Complete Story of Walt Disney's Snow White and the Seven Dwarfs reveal that the Huntsman was afraid to disobey a command to kill Snow White because the Queen might feed him to her panthers or shrink him magically "to the size of a walnut". In one 1937 novelization, the Queen vows the Huntsman would pay dearly for allowing her stepdaughter to escape, but first she would deal with Snow White herself. In another version, the Huntsman would also be dragged to the dungeon when the Queen finds out that he has betrayed her, and the Queen might smash her own Mirror in anger.

The envious Queen would also decide to take possession of Snow White's attractive young suitor, the 18-year-old Prince (described in a press kit as "every woman's dream man") for herself, offering him an opportunity to share the throne with her through a marriage. With the Prince refusing to marry her, the Queen would have him captured by her guards and taken to her dungeon to be suspended in chains in a torture chamber. She would later visit him there and use her sorcery to taunt him by bringing the dungeon's skeletons (also chained to the walls) to life and making them dance, identifying one skeleton as "Prince Oswald" (the name was an inside joke reference to Oswald the Lucky Rabbit), only for the Prince to defy her again. She then has him given to the torturers, described as "the Nubians", and "exits with a dirty laugh." According to production story-meeting notes from October 1934, "Queen wants to marry Prince, but he refuses to acknowledge 'that she is the fairest in the land,' since he has seen Snow White." A story note states about their meeting in the dungeon: "This is a sequence of gruesome comedy ― of dancing skeletons ― fantastic shadows ― witchcraft and deviltry." Later, after transforming herself, she decides to punish the Prince for having scorned her. She informs the Prince of her plan to have the Dwarfs bury Snow White alive and then leaves him to his death, still chained and trapped in a subterranean chamber filling with water to slowly drown. She then makes her way to the Dwarfs' cottage with the poisoned apple, while birds and forest animals were to help the Prince escape the Queen's minions and find his horse as would race to try and save Snow White.

The Prince-in-dungeon plotline described above was not used in the final film, although it was carried out to the drawing and cel stage, and several inspirational sketch pictures of the dungeon scenes were drawn by Ferdinand Hovarth. It is said that Disney "knew that the Queen would have to look scary without being too scary." Some skeletons are briefly featured in the finished film in the other parts of the dungeon, except in Australia's censored original theatrical release version. Similar motifs and scenes were later used in Sleeping Beauty and Aladdin. Elements of this sub-plot have also made their way into some other Disney's Snow White fiction and visitor attractions.

== Other appearances ==
=== Disney theme park attractions ===
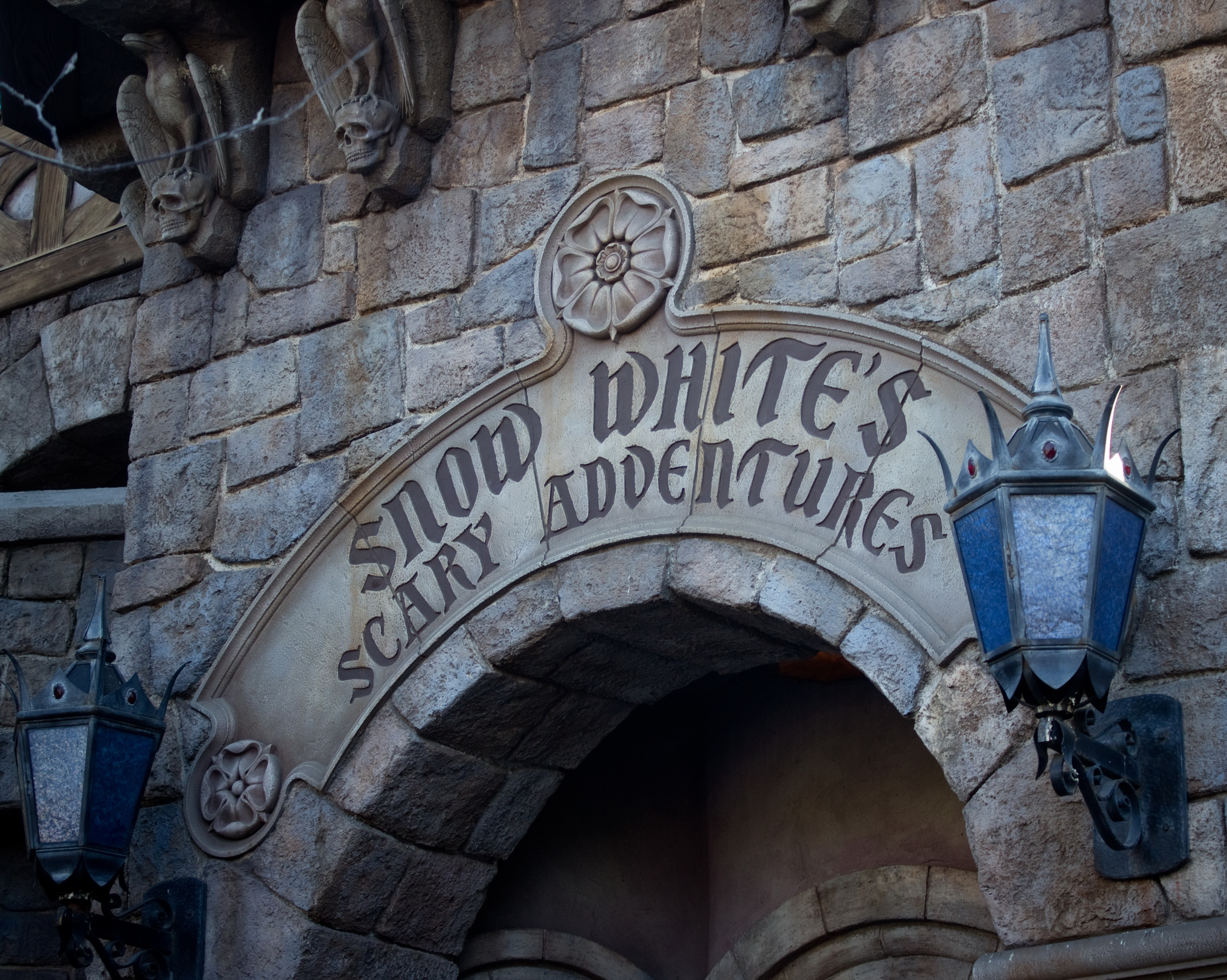
The Queen's castle at Fantasyland (1983–2020)

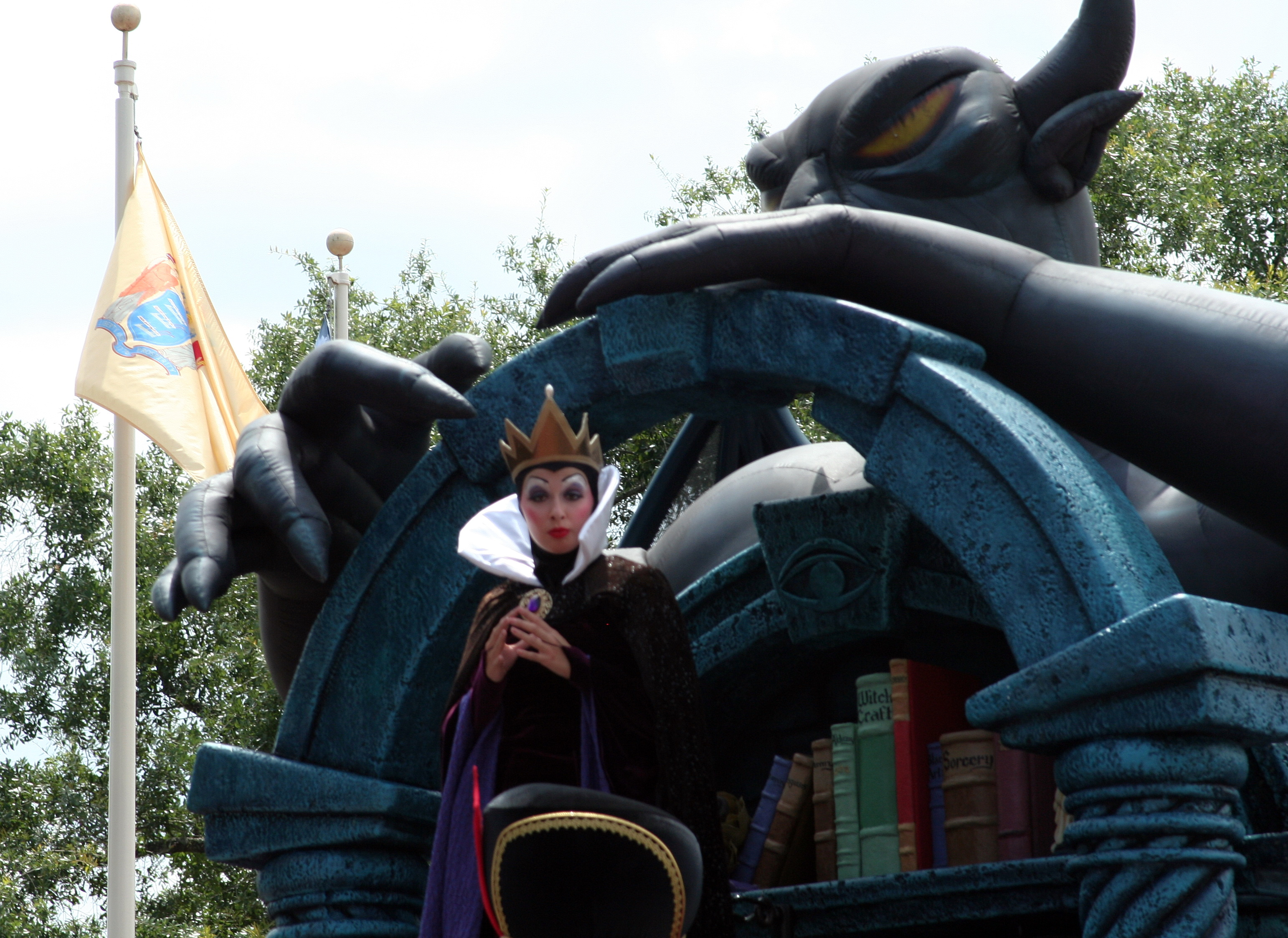
The Queen with her magic books is watched over by the demon Chernabog from Fantasia at Share A Dream Come True Parade 2008

The Queen is a primary character in the Disneyland ride Snow White's Scary Adventures (first opened in 1955), where she was seen more than any other character in all four versions of the ride, recreating a number of scenes from the film, sometimes including the torture chamber from an abandoned concept, with "a few skeletons of her past victims." In one new scene, she turns into a hag while standing in front of the mirror (back to the visitors) and intoning: "Magic Mirror on the wall, with this disguise I'll fool them all!" In 2021, when the ride was redesigned to Snow White's Enchanted Wish, she appeared less often in order for guests to focus more on Snow White's story. She also appears in her hag form at the roller coaster Seven Dwarfs Mine Train, which first opened in 2014.

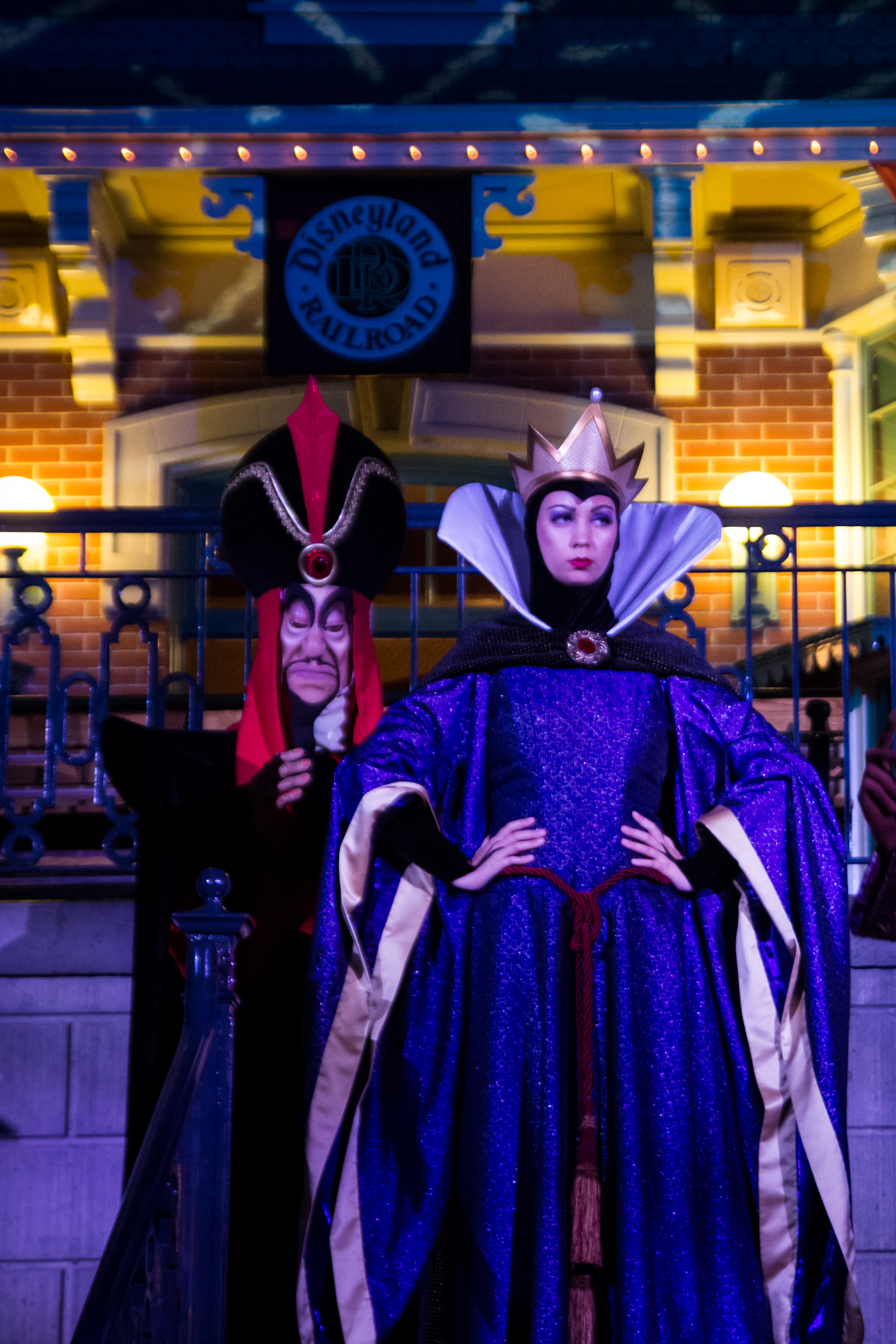
The Evil Queen with the wizard Jafar from Aladdin during Mickey's Not-So-Scary Halloween Party in 2012

In the Disney Villains Mix and Mingle and Mickey's Boo-to-You Halloween Parade shows during Magic Kingdom's Mickey's Not-So-Scary Halloween Party, the Queen is one of the villains led by Maleficent that appear during the Cinderella Castle Forecourt Stage. Susanne Blakeslee voiced the Queen at 2001's Share A Dream Come True Parade, where she could be seen transform herself into a hag. The Evil Queen is one of the "favourite" villains included in Magic Kingdom Park's special pre-parade procession "It's Good to be Bad" a night before the annual Main Street Electrical Parade. One event featured a giant interactive mirror and included the Queen and two other "Divas of Evil", Maleficent and Cruella de Vil. She also prominently appears at Villains Unleashed party, a separately ticketed event at Disney's Hollywood Studios that was introduced in 2014.

In the interactive gallery Walt Disney: One Man's Dream, the Queen appears alongside Maleficent and Judge Frollo in the villains' act of the show, where she seems to be the leader of the trio. On the cruise ship Disney Fantasy, the Queen, appearing with her raven, is one of the seven suspects (and sometimes the culprit) in the interactive gallery Midship Detective Agency's story "The Case of The Plundered Paintings".

=== Film and television ===
The Queen is featured in some Disney television specials like Our Unsung Villains (1956) and Disney's Greatest Villains (1977). Segments of the Queen's appearance are also shown in A Disney Halloween (1981) and Disney's Halloween Treat (1982). She makes small cameo appearances in the animated series House of Mouse, voiced by Susanne Blakeslee (where she is seen sitting with Lady Tremaine in her queen form, and with Madam Mim and Witch Hazel in her witch form) and in the films Who Framed Roger Rabbit (1988) and Runaway Brain (1995), shown there in her witch form.

In the television special Disney's Golden Anniversary of Snow White (1987), the Queen is played by Jane Curtin in a parodic scenario. She casts a spell on Grumpy in an attempt to get him to persuade the other Dwarfs to retire and destroy the original film after the 50 years. After the failure of this, her Mirror convinces her to finally quit "this whole curse business" and focus on her current career as a television horror host.

The Queen (voiced by Susanne Blakeslee) is the main villain in the 2005 animated film Once Upon a Halloween, but appears only in the Witch version despite misleading cover art (furthermore, only her shadow is shown). In it, the Queen plots to conquer Halloween and asks her cauldron to show several villains to which one of them helps her in her plan. The cauldron also explains its origins as it is one of the cauldrons formerly owned by the three witches from The Black Cauldron. Eventually, the cauldron turns against the Queen and makes her vanish into nothingness.

In Enchanted (2007), Susan Sarandon's Queen Narissa characteristics, powers, and physical features were inspired by the Queen as well as by Maleficent from Sleeping Beauty. Hank Tucker's storyboard shows how Narissa would appear as just the Evil Queen in an early version of the film's animated opening. In a possibly related Mike Disa's and Evan Spiliotopoulos' abandoned pitch for the DisneyToons' Snow White prequel film The Seven Dwarfs, a beautiful girl similarly named Narcissa appears to aid the dwarfs against an evil wizard, who would be eventually revealed as her father whom she would betray and trap him inside a mirror. Narcissa steals the ancient magic secrets of the Olden Dwarfs, marries and then murders Snow White's father, and "begins her reign as the Evil Queen, with the damned soul of her own father forever encased in the Magic Mirror as her slave. Thus, the dwarfs must live in hiding to protect their families from the Queen's vengeance." Three animated sequels to The Seven Dwarfs "were to follow the title characters return home to families and friends after the Evil Queen's death in Snow White."

In Descendants (2015), the aged Evil Queen (Kathy Najimy) is among a host of other villains who was resurrected and imprisoned on the forbidden Isle of the Lost, and her daughter Evie (Sofia Carson) is among their offspring who are allowed to return into the kingdom to attend school alongside the offspring of iconic Disney heroes (Evie's father is unidentified). The Evil Queen have joined forces with Maleficent, Jafar, and Cruella De Vil in trying to take over Auradon. Its title image features the iconic red apple of the Evil Queen, which was prominently featured in a teaser trailer. Before the film, was released the novel The Isle of the Lost, also including the Evil Queen as a supporting character, and Evie as one of the main characters. The film was followed by the animated series Descendants: Wicked World (2015), and the films Descendants 2 (2017), and Descendants 3 (2019), all of them starring Sofia Carson as Evie, who also appears in other media of the franchise like short films and books.

The Queen's crown is one of the items known as the Wicked Nine in Sofia the First, having a main focus in the episode "In Cedric We Trust"; being known as Grimhilde's Crown, was put in a museum by Snow White, and during an exhibition, Prisma, one of the main antagonists in the series, tries to stole it.

In The Wonderful World of Mickey Mouse, the Queen, in her old hag form (voiced by Tress MacNeille), is a prominent character in the parody episode "Once Upon an Apple", where she goes up against Mickey Mouse after the mirror told her he is the fairest in the land, ending with Mickey dressing her up as Snow White and sending her off to find her prince.

In Justin Merz and Evan Daugherty's script for the live-action spin-off Rose Red, in development as of 2016, Snow White's sister Rose Red is going to "join Grumpy and the fellow Dwarves on a journey to find the Evil Queen and break her curse." Another Evil Queen related project in development was Michael Seitzman's television series Book of Enchantment, which was cancelled after Disney executives deemed it "too dark".

The Evil Queen appears as one of the antagonists in the Lego special for Disney+ Lego Disney Princess: Villains Unite.

=== Theatrical shows ===
As in the film, the Queen character is featured in 1979 Snow White and the Seven Dwarfs musical version, played by Anne Francine. In the Disney on Ice reenactment of the movie in 1986–1987, and then in 1994–1997 and again in 2000–2001, she was voiced by Louise Chamis and played by various skaters beginning with Melanie Scott in 1986–1987, and including Elena Koteneva, who was substituted by Davina Lee-Gooding in 1995. Francine also played her in the 1980 stage play and television program Snow White Live and Chamis voiced her in Disneyland's Snow White – An Enchanting Musical in 2004 and 2006. The Evil Queen was further featured in Disney Live's Three Classic Fairy Tales in the section based on the film.

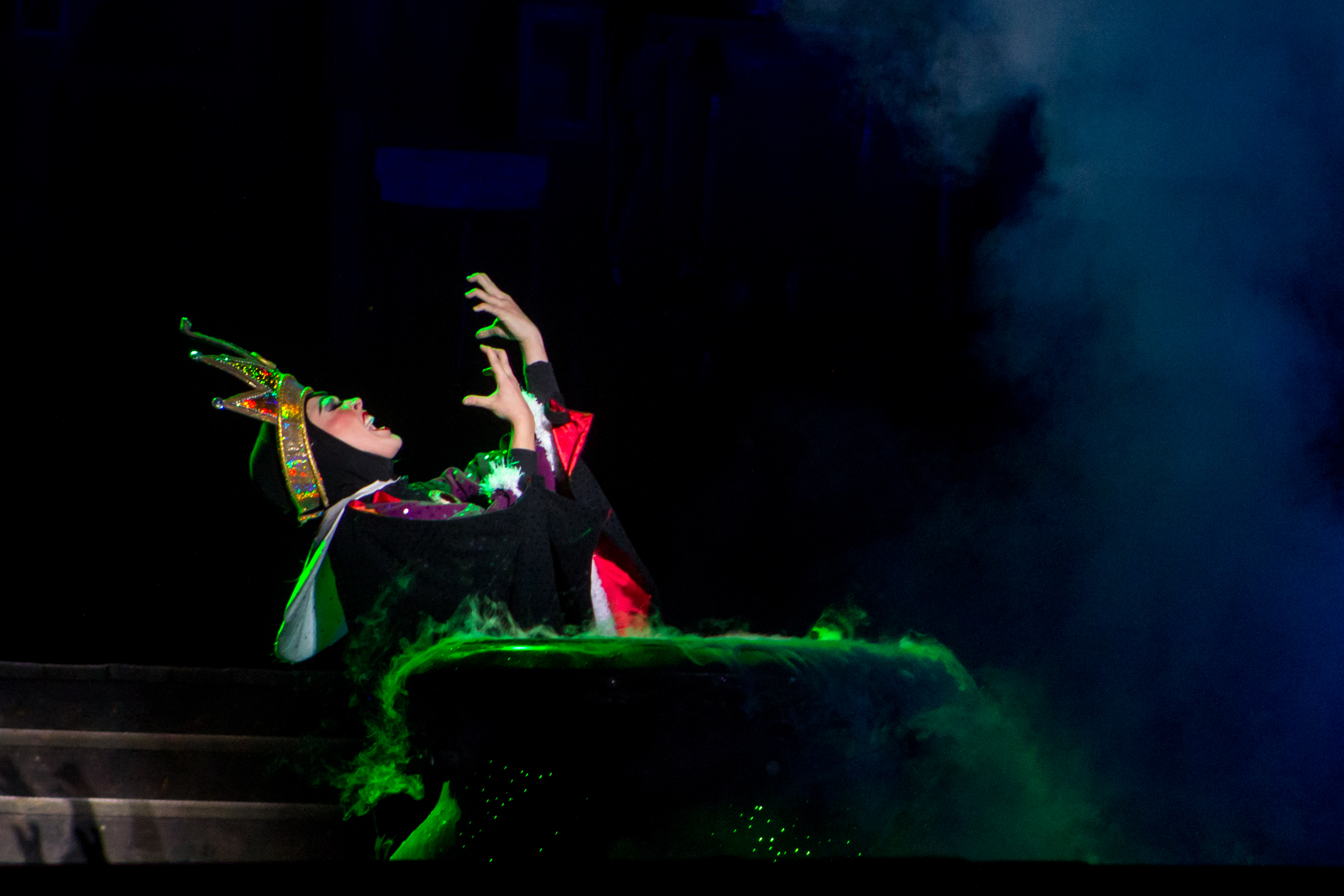
The Queen with her magic cauldron during Fantasmic! show in 2013

In the night-time visual show Fantasmic!, first played in 1992, the Queen, voiced by Louise Chamis, is the main villain and the leader of all the Disney Villains. She is introduced in the second act, when her Magic Mirror (voiced by Tony Jay) tells her that there are now three princesses (Snow White, Ariel and Belle) fairer than her. Enraged, the Queen transforms herself into a hag and uses the Mirror and her cauldron to summon various "all the forces of evil" in the form of a collection of Disney villains to come to her aid. They include Maleficent, who transforms into a dragon. (In the Tokyo DisneySea version, she also traps Mickey inside her mirror.) At the climax of the show, Mickey is able to defeat the dragon and vanquish all the villains with a magic sword. The Witch is the last to die, transforming back into the Queen before she is destroyed.

In the Disney Dream cruise ship show Villains Tonight!, first played in 2010, Hades calls forth Disney's most powerful villains for help to regain his evil. The Queen, changing from the Witch form, denies his invitation since Hades also invited Maleficent, her rival for Hades' affections and for the status of "the most evil in the land". The Queen claims not to be Hades' girlfriend, but they just had "an interesting weekend" on Castaway Cay. In the end, the Queen and Maleficent put their differences aside as all villains should stick together and advise Hades to find evil within himself, and not from others.

=== Games ===
The Evil Queen is featured in a number of traditional games, albeit usually as a mere obstacle for the players. She is, however, playable in some of them, such as Snow White and the Seven Dwarfs Game in the Disneykins franchise and Disney Villains Collector's Edition Monopoly. In 2019, the Evil Queen was added to Disney Villainous as a playable character in the expansion set Wicked to the Core. Jim Razzi's 1985 children's gamebook Snow White in the Enchanted Forest (Choose Your Own Adventure: Walt Disney #1) features an alternate story starring the original character of the Prince's unnamed teenage squire trying to save Snow White in a series of non-canonical confrontations with Evil Queen as she is searches the Enchanted Forest for the princess hiding with the Dwarfs, as the goal is either to "put her, once and for all" before it is too late, or to lead the Prince to the sleeping Snow White. (Note: This task is made harder by the Queen's much greater powers in it than in the film, including being able to instantly change between her hag and queen forms at will, similarly change herself back and forth into different animals to deceive or attack, control the "evil wood-spirits" of living "black trees", turn others into animals with magic beams from her hands, and magically disappear in a cloud of smoke. In an alternative ending to the film's story, killing her earlier can be achieved if the boy has his stallion Hero fight her off in the form of a huge ferocious boar, then choosing to listen to Bashful and chase her to a high cliff, where she is trapped and turns back into her Queen form just before Hero forces her to fall down the chasm; the boy and Bashful then leave to tell Snow White "the good news".)

The Queen serves as the antagonist in the unreleased Snow White game for the Atari 2600. In 2001's Walt Disney's Snow White and the Seven Dwarfs for the Game Boy Color, the players need first to solve a puzzle-mini game for the Queen to consult her mirror, and later to lead the Dwarfs in pursuit of the Witch before she can get back to her castle.

In the 1990 video game Castle of Illusion Starring Mickey Mouse, an old witch named Mizrabel takes the form of the Evil Queen after draining the youth from Minnie Mouse. In 2012's Epic Mickey: Power of Illusion, the previously defeated Mizrabel returns to transform into various Disney villains, including the Queen, before setting on Maleficent. In 2013's HD remake of Castle of Illusion, Mizrabel looks like a cross between the Queen and Maleficent in her youthful form and professes her ambition to be "the fairest of them all".

The Evil Queen in person is one of the four Disney Villains that appear in 1999 video game Disney's Villains' Revenge, voiced by Louise Chamis. Jiminy Cricket and the player venture into the worlds of the stories to restore the happy endings. In the game's final story, it is shown that the Queen has a lair resembling her poisoned apple inside the forest, where she intends to put the Seven Dwarfs to eternal sleep. The player needs to correctly mix ingredients for several potions including the True Love Potion to magically summon the Prince so he can save Snow White with a kiss. It is followed by the fight with the Queen in which the player has to reflect her magic ball spells, until she retreats to her lair. There, while asking her mirror, she suddenly transforms into a hag and is frightened to death by her own reflection in the magic mirror that then breaks.

In 2010's video game Kingdom Hearts: Birth by Sleep, the Queen (voiced by Kyoko Satomi in Japanese and Susanne Blakeslee in English) appears in the Dwarf Woodlands world. She recruits Terra to kill Snow White and bring back her heart in return for allowing him to use the Magic Mirror to locate Xehanort. Terra, like the huntsman, ultimately does not go through with this, and the Queen, learning of his betrayal, forces the Mirror to consume him, but Terra manages to fight the Mirror off and the Queen reluctantly gives him the information he looks for. She later appears briefly in Ventus's scenario, where she crosses paths with him on her way to poison Snow White. She drops the poisoned apple, which Ventus returns to her. She notices Ventus's Keyblade and muses that Terra threatened her with a similar weapon. The Evil Queen is mentioned in Aqua's storyline when the Magic Mirror tells Aqua that the Queen is dead and that he is no longer under her control.

In 2013's free-to-play mobile game Seven Dwarfs: The Queen's Return, an uncanonical continuation of the film, the Queen has survived the fall at the climax of the film because there was a lake at the bottom of the abyss. She then reverted to her youthful form and, seeking revenge, cast an evil curse on Snow White as well as the dwarfs and their entire forest. The game's updates were supposed to allow the players to "meet (and defeat)" the Queen, adding quests involving a search for her hidden hideout to, as promised, "help the Dwarfs rid the enchanted forest of the Evil Queen." However, this was ultimately left unresolved as the game was discontinued in 2014.

A 2014 weekly challenge in Disney Infinity: Toy Box included "Mirror Mirror" obstacle course that pit Snow White against the Evil Queen in a race for the poisonous apple. Downloadable Queen-themed avatar costumes were made available for the users of the PlayStation 3 and Xbox 360 video game consoles. A webcam browser game Become Your Inner Villain hosted on Disneyland Resort's Facebook page enables the player turn into one of four villains including the Evil Queen. Her dungeon and laboratory (complete with the Mirror) are featured in the online game Aaah-Choo. The Queen is referenced as one of the Seven Great Magicians in the mobile game Disney Twisted-Wonderland, in which there is a dorm in her honor called Pomefiore at the school Night Raven College, famous for being the oldest of all.

In 2017, the Queen was a playable character to unlock for a limited time in the video game Disney Magic Kingdoms. An alternative version of the Evil Queen appears as a playable character fighting the villains for her own power-hungry purposes in the 2022 video game Disney Mirrorverse.

In the 2025 visual novel and bartending simulation game Disney Villains Cursed Café, The Evil Queen is reimagined as a ruthless, high-fashion cosmetics mogul who runs a mega-beauty empire built on vanity and flawless PR, and her product "Vitagems" (also referred to as VA Gems), the energy crystals that she claims have invigorating, energy-boosting effects, but are secretly intended to make people obey her commands. She is the CEO of "Fairest Cosmetics," obsessed with eternal youth and market dominance. She struggles to maintain her flawless public image while dealing with competitive stress and corporate pressure. She attempts to recruit ordinary commoners to join her network as "Crystal Nobles" or "Crystal Associates". Her storyline heavily features themes of vanity, mirrors, and toxic perfectionism. The Player's relationship with The Evil Queen shifts from a tense transactional service to a complicated "villainous friendship." As the cafe's Potionista, The Player acts as her sounding board, corporate critic, and magical confidante. The Player's relationship is shaped by several key factors. Initially, she treats The Player strictly as a server. She can be incredibly snarky, demanding, and quick to anger if The Player messes up her orders. If The Player says the wrong thing or brews the wrong drink, The Player can trigger her wrath. The Player often has to rely on Yzma's "Do-Over Doppio" potion to rewind time and fix the mistakes. As she sits at the counter, she vents to The Player about her competitive stress, her cosmetics empire ("Fairest Cosmetics"), and her disdain for Gaston's dating life. The Player is one of the few people who can openly question her. For instance, The Player can criticize her plans to launch a literal pyramid scheme (a multi-level marketing (MLM) business venture) called "The Crystal Queen", though she will likely try to dismiss the warnings. Deep down, she visits the café because she actively craves The Player's reassurance to feel like corporate royalty. The Player's dialogue choices and potions directly steer her destiny. The Player can choose to enable her toxic vanity or gently guide her toward letting go of her corporate control.

=== Literature ===
In the 1949 audiobook release, the Queen (voiced by Eleanor Audley) tells the Huntsman to take Snow White to the forest and leave her there to die. In the end of the book, after being chased by the dwarfs, the Queen dies when she slips while climbing the mountain and falls into the sea. The Queen's story from the film is itself subject of the 2018 storybook release Disney Villains: The Evil Queen.

One chapter in Todd Strasser's 1993 Disney's the Villains Collection/Stories from the Films is dedicated to Snow White and the Queen. She is also a subject of one of the illustrated books in the Disney Princess series My Side of the Story, titled Snow White/The Queen (2004), which portrays her as a misunderstood positive character.

The novel Fairest of All: A Tale of the Wicked Queen by Serena Valentino, published by Disney Press in 2009, tells a story much more sympathetic to the Queen than most other Disney media. The book shows how the Queen became the villain from the film, much in the style of The Killing Joke, with the Magic Mirror, here possessed by the spirit of her abusive father, having been a corrupting influence. According to the book, her mother was a witch and the King died in a war against another kingdom prior to the events of the film. After her husband's death, the Queen slowly descends into madness. By the end of the novel, Snow White gets the mirror and the Queen becomes the spirit inside the mirror after her death in the film.

The Queen is one of the Overtakers, villains of The Kingdom Keepers novel series. She was introduced in 2011 in the fourth book of the saga, Power Play, alongside Cruella De Vil. Like Maleficent, she is very powerful and is able to cast almost any spell with a flick of her finger; she can also transform herself and other characters. In Power Play, when Maleficent and Chernabog are captured by the Keepers, the Queen becomes the new leader of the Overtakers.

Melissa de la Cruz wrote the Descendants prequel novel Isle of the Lost. In that book, it is revealed that the Evil Queen once tried to overthrow Maleficent as the ruler of the Isle.

=== Comics ===
The 1937–1938 film tie-in serial comic strip "Snow White and the Seven Dwarfs" written by Merrill De Maris, one of the writers of the film, is centred primarily around the relationship between Snow White and the Queen. It further explores the source of the Queen's descent into a murderous envy, as she learns that the Prince came to her castle seeking the most beautiful woman in all the world and is shocked when he says he meant Snow White. Like in the abandoned film concept, the Queen (here actually named Grimhilde) has the Prince arrested. In her Witch form, she later tells the captive Prince that she is going to get rid of Snow White and make him hers, while the Prince is defiant and calls her a "miserable hag". This scene is followed by his escape from prison, in much less dramatic circumstances than the film's drowning concept. The film was further adapted into an other comics including in 1969, 1973, 1983, and 1991.

There are a number of sequel comics quasi-canonically set in the film's world. A 1939 Italian comic "Snow White and the Wizard Basilisk" (Biancaneve e il mago Basilisco) features the titular evil wizard who later lives in the castle that had belonged to the Queen, trying to hurt Snow White's and the Prince's son until he is too killed when the castle is destroyed. The Prince's imprisonment in the Queen's dungeon from the earlier comics is referenced in it. Another early sequel comic Pamuk Prenses ile Sevimli Prens (1942) tells of the further adventures of Snow White and Prince Charming, as the Witch returns to put a spell on the latter. In one American 1944 sequel, the dead Queen's castle is taken over by her brother, the Wicked Prince.

Later comics usually feature the Queen in her Witch incarnation, often with her still trying to eliminate either Snow White ("The Seven Dwarfs and Thumper", "No Ritmo Da Bruxa", "A Maçã Superenfeitiçada", "Kerstverhaal") or the dwarfs ("The Enchanted Mountain", "Halloween"). Such stories include Jack Bradbury's stand-alone 1958 comics Mystery of the Missing Magic and A New Adventure of Snow White and the Seven Dwarfs. In the comic "The Seven Dwarfs and the Witch-Queen", the Witch shrinks all the dwarfs except of Dopey who manages to save his brothers. In "A Pirate's Tale" (aka "The Pirate"), the greedy old Witch transforms herself into a rat as she plans to steal a treasure and turn the dwarfs into cheese and eat them, but Dopey destroys her with a cat.

Usually under the guise (and alias) of the Witch, she often comes back to interact (usually to antagonize, but sometimes also to occasionally cooperating with protagonists) with other Disney characters. She has appeared in the comics of many characters, including Daisy Duck's nieces April, May and June, the Beagle Boys, Br'er Rabbit, Chip 'n' Dale, Donald Duck & Mickey Mouse, Goofy, Huey, Dewey, and Louie, Jiminy Cricket, José Carioca, Mickey & Minnie Mouse, Li'l Bad Wolf, Tinker Bell, and the Three Little Pigs, as well as her fellow Disney witches such as Madam Mim from The Sword in the Stone, Witch Hazel from Trick or Treat, and Magica De Spell (especially in Brazilian comics). She also starred with the Big Bad Wolf in the 1970s-1980's comics series The Big Bad Wolf & The Wicked Witch, including "Mirror Mirror", "Witch Switch", "The Apple Caper", "The High-Hopping Wolf", "Double Trouble", and "Getting the Boot".

Several comics include the Witch kidnapping another Disney character, either to be her slave or to exchange them for something, until they are rescued. Example of this include her abducting, besides Snow White ("Diamond Dust Dilemma", "The Weather Witch"), such characters as Chip 'n' Dale ("Witch Convention"), Tinker Bell ("Pixie Dust Dilemma", "The Big Bust-out"), and Dumbo characters ("Dumbo", "The Chips Are Flying", "A Witch in Time"). The Witch also captures Dumbo in "Dumbo l'échappe belle", but is defeated by Mickey and Br'er Bear and imprisoned by the Dwarfs. In "The Gingerbread House", the Witch captures the Wicked Witch of the West's children Witch Child and Warlock whom Magica De Spell was tasked to look after. Another recurring motif is the Witch's attempts to turn characters into gold, for example Pinocchio ("The Magic Brew") or all the forest animals ("Get Rich Witch"). She may also simply try to steal the treasures, from either the Dwarfs ("Snow White and The Seven Dwarfs", "Verjongingsdrank") or other characters ("Black Magic Menace", "Pursuit of Plunder"). In a prequel story Battle of Wits and Witches, the Queen turns into the hag to steal a diamond from the Dwarfs but is foiled by Mickey and Goofy. She also repeatedly attempts to ruin Christmas, like in "The Golden Christmas Tree" where she lures Huey, Dewey and Louie to her lair use their tear drops in a magic potion to destroy all the Christmas trees in the world, or in "Delivery Problems" where she plots to put Santa Claus' reindeer to sleep.

In the Walt Disney's Comics and Stories parody of The Wonderful Wizard of Oz, "The Wizard of Bahs" by Vic Lockman and Strobl, the Witch is unexpectedly turned into an old tree trunk by Daisy Duck while her castle turns to sand. In "The Captured Castle", the Witch captures Cinderella's castle, while in "It's Snow Joke" she turns Dale's snowdragon alive and Chip 'n' Dale steal her flying powder in "The Magic Spell". The Witch's magic wand is obtained by Goofy in "Magic-Mender" and stolen by the Big Bad Wolf in "The Magic Wand". In "The Haunted House Caper", the Witch turns Donald Duck's house into a haunted one, a story continued in "13 Blackcat Road". In O Sindicato Das Bruxas, José Carioca fights against her syndicate of witches. In "The Washed-up Witch", she ends up deprived of her powers and accepting Scrooge McDuck's offer to become his private secretary, while Mickey hires the Witch as a babysitter for Morty and Ferdie in "The Sitter Solution".

Many stories have been first published in Italian Disney digest comic series, in particular in Topolino. They include "The Seven Dwarfs and the Evil Witch" (I Sette Nani e la Strega Malvagia), "Snow White and the Broken Mirror" (Biancaneve e lo specchio infranto), "The Seven Dwarfs and the Spell of the Queen" (I Sette Nani e l'incantesimo della regina), "Snow White and the Castle of Four Winds" (Biancaneve al castello dei quattro venti), "The Seven Dwarfs and the Heroic Antieve" (I Sette Nani e l'eroica antivigilia), "The Seven Dwarfs and the Brew of Seven Herbs" (I Sette Nani e l'infuso delle sette erbe aka "The Seven Herbs Spell!"), "Snow White and the Silver Rose" (Biancaneve e la rosa d'argento), and "The Seven Dwarfs and the Joker Wizard" (I Sette Nani e il mago burlone), among others. "Snow White and the Shattered Mirror" (Biancaneve e lo specchio infranto) has the old Witch, terminally ill, discover she has only one day to live, but she refuses to accept her destiny and finds a way to conquer death.

In Italian comics, the Queen in her youthful form is usually wearing a red robe and is often shown using a crystal ball to spy on the good characters. "Goofy the Magician and the Seven Dwarfs" (Pippo mago e i Sette Nani) has the Queen's four goon henchmen attack the dwarfs and steal their treasure but then decide to keep it for themselves and Grimhilde seeks help from the wizard Abracadabro to stop their run; eventually, it is the Prince who defeats the robbers. In some other comics, the Queen works specifically to magically hurt Snow White and others in various cruel ways. "Donald Fracasse" (Paperin Fracassa) is a parody of the adventure film Captain Fracasse in which Snow White is blinded by the Queen and Donald Duck needs to heal her. In "The Seven Dwarfs and Christmas in Danger" (I Sette Nani e il Natale in pericolo), the Queen goes to steal a comet stardust as the last ingredient for her spell to destroy Snow White. In another Christmas story, "The Seven Dwarfs and the Christmas Spell" (Il Sette Nani e l'incantesimo di Natale, the Queen turns Snow White's baby son Glauco into a Christmas tree, but the curse is broken by the motherly love of the princess. In "Grump & Crump" (Brontolo & Briciola), Grumpy sends the Queen to her to prison by the magic of the Christmas mistletoe.

Many of the Topolino Snow White comics were the works of Romano Scarpa. His comic "The Seven Dwarfs and King Arbor's Crystal" (I Sette Nani e il cristallo di Re Arbor) provides an explanation as to how the Queen would have survived her apparent death in the film (as some branches and bushes eased the fall and she was rescued by her loyal guards) and why she could not change back to her normal self (as her castle was burned down by the Huntsman and her book of magic is gone). In this story, Grimhilde (Grimilde) enlists the aid of her great admirer and past suitor, the evil King Arbor of Vegetalia, in a plot to use a magic crystal device to swap her old body with Snow White's. The intrigue is foiled by the dwarves who destroy the crystal, and the resigned Arbor allows the Witch to live with him, saying he will try to remember she was "the most beautiful among queens". The uneasy relationship between Grimhilde and Abor continued in "The Seven Dwarfs and the Fountainhead" (I Sette nani e la fonte meravigliosa), in which she desperately attempts to regain her youth, but instead only turns into a childlike version of her Witch form for a short time.

Other comics by Scarpa do have the Queen back in her youthful body, and sometimes even taking other shapes, as well as commanding various minions. In "The Seven Dwarfs and the Birtch Ring" (I Sette Nani e l'anello di betulla by Romano Scarpa), the Queen learns about the eighth Dwarf named Ginger (Zenzero), who has left his companions to go in search of fortune traveling the world, and transforms into a pixie calling herself Fagottina to send him home and sow discord among his brothers. In "The Seven Dwarfs and the Wolf's Cliff" (I Sette Nani e la balza del lupo), she sends a gang of three bandits named Bragia, Sghembo and Schidione to kidnap Snow White. In "The Seven Dwarfs and the Throne of Diamonds" (I Sette Nani e il trono di diamanti), Jiminy Cricket is deeply enamored by the Queen's beauty and attempts to convince her to become good, but the Queen refuses to be redeemed. Instead she orders her loyal soldiers to steal the throne that the Dwarfs make for Snow White in a plot to turn her rival into an old woman. Eventually, the Queen is captured by another witch named Tardona and Snow White is restored to her youth.

Several stories by Scarpa and others have the Queen meet her actual end in various ways while trying to get her revenge, usually involving being defeated by Dopey as he alone escapes her plots. In Scarpa's three-part "Snow White and the Green Flame" (Biancaneve e verde fiamma), the Queen proudly flies on a broom to the great gathering of witches, expecting to be celebrated, but is met with a very different welcome: the other attendees scorn her and declare that her shameful inability to deal with just a little girl and a few dwarfs has disgraced them all, and for this she should be punished according to the laws of Hell. When the Queen begs the High Witch for mercy, she is given the last chance and a powerful magic wand with the power of transformation to use against her enemies. However, she is told that, if she still fails again this time, she herself will be turned into a magic broom for a more "honorable" witch to fly on. Desperate to avoid her sentence, the Queen uses the wand to gain trust of Snow White and to turn her a figurine, then takes the form of the princess to ambush the dwarfs and do the same with them. But Dopey escapes and he manages to outwit the Queen as she waits for the Prince's arrival to complete her work. After a fight, he takes hold of her wand and uses it to restore his friends and to foil the last gamble of the Queen, who is herself transformed into the figurine and then turns into a broom by the High Witch's curse. "Snow White and the Bewitched Dress" (Biancaneve e l'abito stregato) has the Queen magically disguise herself as an old Gypsy to give Snow White a cursed dress and capture her, then start her work on the spell to rid of the dwarfs and all the good forest creatures that aid Snow White. But Dopey infiltrates her castle, frees Snow White, and locks up the Queen inside her laboratory set ablaze; after he and the princess escape, they watch how the castle with the Queen trapped in her own dungeon is consumed by fire and finally explodes. In "The Seven Dwarfs and the Covenant of the Queen" (I Sette Nani e il patto della regina), she conjures the demon Shadow Lord Oren and makes a pact with him to take the soul of Snow White, but Oren warns her that if she fails she will pay him with her own life. With now greater powers and the help of seven evil dwarfs she attempts to eliminate her hated rival once and for all, but instead ends up burning all of her vital energy and Oren arrives to inform her how she has destroyed herself with her own hands. The Queen, begging for a last chance, disappears as Oren takes her with him to Hell.

In some of such stories, the Queen's demise is brought by a good fairy. Scarpa's "Snow White and the Chained Fairy" (I Sette Nani e la fata incatenata) begins with Grimhilde flying to strike down Snow White with a thunderbolt, but the princess is saved by the fairy named Fawn. The Queen retaliates by capturing Fawn in a dangerous cavern and the dwarfs go there to free the fairy. To thwart their mission, the Queen takes on many forms trying destroy them in various ways, and one-by-one the dwarfs sacrifice their lives until only Dopey remains. But then he alone manages to win the magical water that brings back all of them to life, and the freed fairy's magic makes the cavern collapse down on the Queen to make sure she will never hurt anyone again. The Queen also again transforms into a pixie in his "Snow White and Easter in the Woods" (Biancaneve e la Pasqua nel bosco), where, after her attempt to kill Snow White with magic is foiled by woodland creatures, the Queen is so enraged that she calls upon the infernal powers to "take her" and her castle burns into flames and crumbles around her. "The Seven Dwarfs and the Christmas Fairy" (I Sette Nani e la fatina di Natale) presents a scenario in which the Queen successfully casts a forever-sleep enchantment on Snow White once again, but this time the curse is perfected as to not be broken by an awakening kiss. However, while trying to zap Dopey, she then accidentally falls victim of her own witchcraft. The titular Christmas Fairy manages to wakes up Snow White, but leaves the Queen to her Sleeping Beauty style fate.

The Queen also appears as one of the villains in the 2005 Disney manga series Kilala Princess by Rika Tanaka and Nao Kodaka, where the protagonists Rei and Kilala Reno find themselves in the world of Snow White, and meet and befriend the princess. They go the Queen's castle to ask the Magic Mirror how to find Kilala's friend Erika, but discover the Queen is still alive (and even commanding the two vultures, as well as wolves) as she appears and demands Kilala's magical tiara. The children try to flee but are attacked by wolves and locked up in the dungeon, where the Queen transforms into the Witch and prepares to turn Kilala into an ugly creature. Snow White appears and agrees to sacrifice herself to save them, but Kilala stops her at last moment before she can eat a poison apple; Rei then attacks the Queen, who falls into her cauldron, turns into a vulture, and flies away in a defeat.

=== Merchandise ===
The character has been featured in a wide variety of Disney merchandise, such as in the Designer Villains series of limited edition dolls and make-up products, or the Wickedly Beautiful entry in the Beautifully Disney collection of cosmetic products. Various other such merchandise include many dolls and figurines/statuettes, costumes, clothing items, watches/clocks/mirrors, mugs, other tableware, bags/purses/suitcases, containers, key chains, prints/posters/cards/stickers, pins/buttons/magnets, plush toys, holiday ornaments, other beauty products, and so forth. In one issue of Disney Adventures in 1997, the Evil Queen appeared on the cover attempting to woo Will Smith.

One hand-made figure costing $2,000 was the most expensive out of 200,000 items being sold at the Disney World shopping village in 1985. During an auction in 1988, an animation cel from the iconic scene of the Queen holding her heart box sold for a record-setting price of $30,000. In 1997, another cel from the same scene sold for $21,275 and a cel of the Witch offering an apple to Snow White realized $13,800. Another cel showing the Queen reading her spellbook sold for $8,050 in an earlier in auction in 1995. In 2015, a Hag cel was sold on an auction for $48,000. Another record was made in 2016, when a cel of the Queen in front of her mirror was sold for $58,000.

== Alternative versions ==
=== Order of the Seven ===
Order of the Seven, cancelled in 2012, was Disney's live-action martial arts retelling of the Snow White story set in the 19th-century China, where the Evil Queen figure would be an Asian empress. The project was also known under other working titles such as Snow White and the Seven.

=== Once Upon a Time ===
An almost entirely alternate take on the character of the Evil Queen is Regina Mills, the main antagonist of the first season of the 2011 ABC live-action television series Once Upon a Time, where she is played by Lana Parrilla. Regina is the mayor of the idyllic town of Storybrooke, Maine, but is secretly the Evil Queen of legend, having cursed many beloved fairy tale characters to live in a dimension without magic, where they never have their happy endings and almost everyone but Regina has been given false memories. She is the adoptive mother of Henry Mills, a ten-year-old born in the real world outside Storybrooke, whom she genuinely loves but has a strained relationship with due to his discovery of the curse, which she tries to convince him is just a child's delusion. The first season revolves around Henry's attempts to prove to newcomer Emma Swan that she is the prophesied savior who can break Regina's curse.

The show is not directly based on the Disney animated films, but is inspired by them and makes many references to them. One of its episodes is titled "The Evil Queen". Regina's reason for hating Snow White is not, as in the fairy tale and Disney film, jealousy of her beauty, but rather resentment over the fact that as a child, Snow unwittingly revealed Regina's romance with a stable boy named Daniel, which led to Daniel's death and Regina being trapped in a loveless marriage to Snow's father, King Leopold. Unlike her classic depiction, Regina does not die and ultimately redeems herself, becoming one of the main protagonists of the series.

=== Snow White ===
Gal Gadot portrays the character of the Evil Queen in Snow White, a 2025 live-action reimagination of the 1937 animated film. In April 2022, Gadot revealed that she sings and dances in the film, which is something that the character did not do in the original animated film. The following year, Gadot later added that playing the role of the first Disney villain ever was "fun and delicious", feeling that she was able to make a more dramatic role by changing her voice due to the film being a musical. In the film, the Evil Queen appeared after the death of Snow White's mother and showed off her magic. When she foresaw a threat to the kingdom, the Evil Queen had the King lead his army on a mission. Once the King was gone, the Evil Queen oppressed the kingdom by having most of the farmers recruited to the royal guard, some riches taken from the civilians, and had Snow White reduced to a scullery maid while having a servant cut off her pony tail. As long as the Magic Mirror kept telling the Evil Queen that she is the fairest in the land, Snow White was safe.

Years later, Snow White tries to defend a rebel bandit named Jonathan when the Huntsman catches him taking something from the kitchen. The Evil Queen has Jonathan tied to the gate without his coat and shoes so that he can die from the cold. After Snow White freed Jonathan and the Magic Mirror stated that Snow White is the fairest in the land, the Evil Queen had the Huntsman take Snow White to the apple orchard where he is to kill her and bring back his heart. Unfortunately, the Huntsman couldn't do the job and had Snow White flee while holding back the information on what the Evil Queen did to the King.

After asking the Magic Mirror again and learning that Snow White is alive and with seven magical beings, (Note: The characters are not referred to as "dwarfs" in the film. The term "magical beings" was used in promotion.) she finds the box that she provided the Huntsman with containing an apple instead. After having the Huntsman condemned to the dungeon, the Evil Queen sends the royal guards to find Snow White. They managed to catch Jonathan in their net and the Evil Queen has him condemned in the same dungeon that the Huntsman is in. Taking matters into her own hands, the Evil Queen enters her secret chamber and plans to take matters into her own hands by taking a potion that turns her into an elderly peddler. She proceeds to make the poisoned apple and leaves out the secret passageway near the moat.

After the miners head off to work, the Evil Queen's old peddler form visited Snow White stating that she is a friend of Jonathan and gives her the poisoned apple which she eats. Before teleporting away upon Snow White entering the Sleeping Death, the Evil Queen states to Snow White that she murdered her father, having been disgusted with his beliefs on goodness. Back at the castle, the Magic Mirror tells the Evil Queen that she is the fairest in the land as she goes to the balcony where the civilians are made to chant "Long live the Queen".

Following Jonathan's escape and him awakening Snow White from the Sleeping Death, the Evil Queen is confronted by Snow White and the roused civilians. The Evil Queen dares Snow White to take her kingdom back by stabbing her with a diamond knife which Snow White is unable to do. As the royal guards move in to take out Snow White, she reminds them on how she knew them from their previous jobs while mentioning how the Evil Queen killed the King. As the seven miners and Jonathan's bandits prevent the Evil Queen from killing Snow White, the royal guards turn on her. Retreating into her castle, the Evil Queen speaks to the Magic Mirror and states that she is still the fairest. The Magic Mirror states "Famed is thy beauty, but it goes no further than the skin. For Snow White, beauty comes from deep within". As Snow White arrives during that point, the Magic Mirror continues by quoting "And so, my Queen, at last you see, she will always be more fair than thee". The furious Evil Queen then uses her scepter to break the Magic Mirror while shouting "YOU LIE" as the scepter breaks in the process. The shards stop halfway as the Magic Mirror's voice echoes "Snow White, more fair than thee". The Evil Queen then slowly turns into glass and her shattering remains get sucked into the vortex in the Magic Mirror as it repairs itself.

== Reception and legacy ==
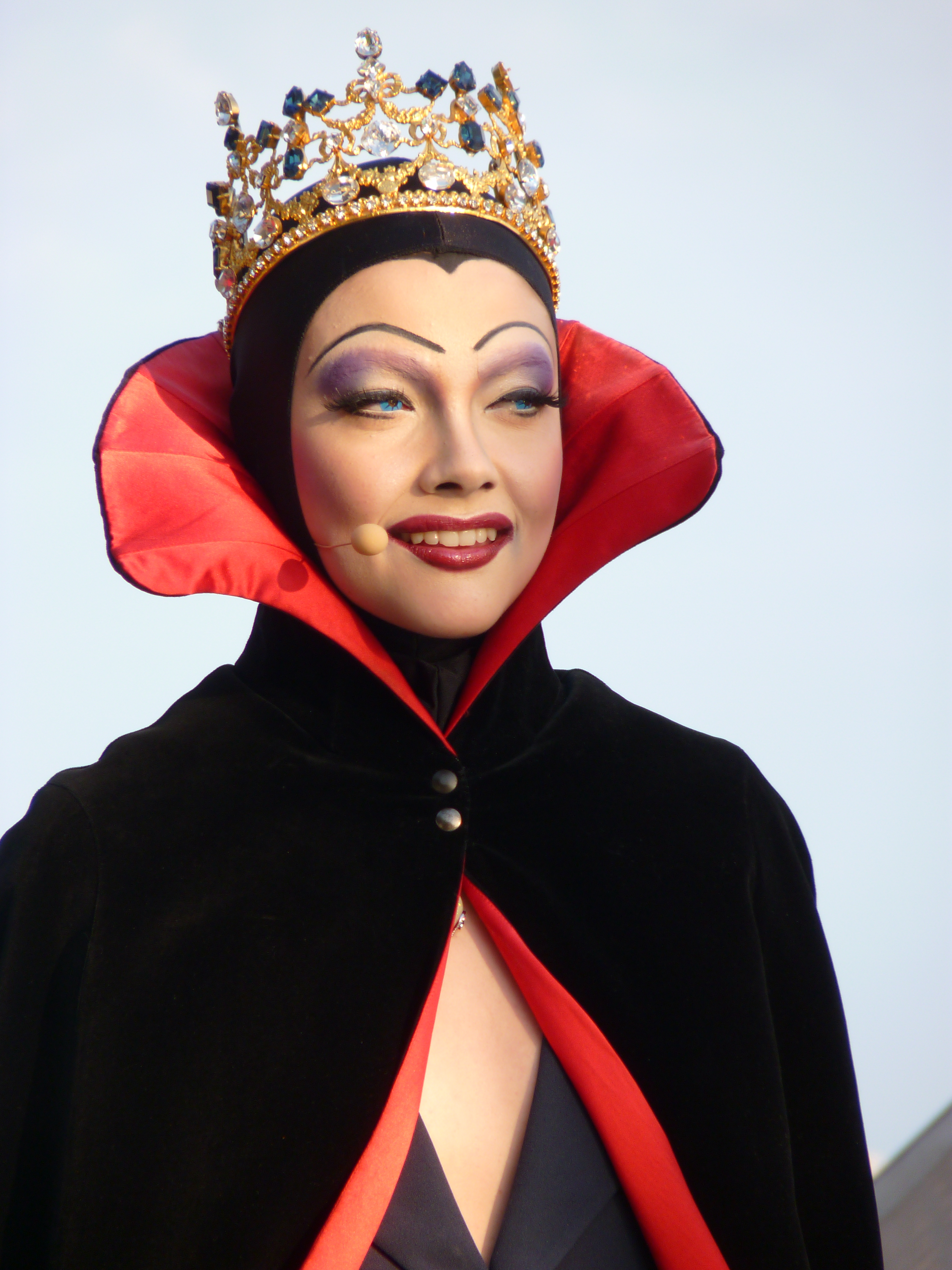
French actress and TV host Solweig Rediger-Lizlow at the 2012 Cannes Festival

=== Critical reception and popularity ===
The Disney version of the character was very well received by film critics, even as some were disturbed (columnist Dorothy Kilgallen for instance urged Disney to not make future villains as scary as the Witch). According to Eric Smoodin of the British Film Institute, the Queen has been "perhaps then as now the real star of the film", as "the one significant character who does not sing – the Queen – stands out as the only really compelling personality in the film. She is driven by human emotions writ large: jealousy, hatred, narcissism, insecurity. She is also subject to an extraordinarily violent death when, as the old hag and pursued by the dwarfs, she plummets off a cliff. (...) At the very least, this [transformation] scene and others in which she appears make the Queen the most memorable character in the film, while the nuances of La Verne’s performance also, perhaps, make her the most sympathetic." Janet Maslin wrote the film's Snow White "exists only to be victimized by her wicked stepmother - a far more interesting character. The image of the wicked Queen (initially conceived as a raven-haired glamour girl, and the epitome of late-1930s sophistication) who drinks an aging potion and then shrivels, sprouting warts and claws, turning before our eyes from a sexy, voluptuous creature into a frightening old crone, must leave as powerful an impression on the audience as Snow White's chirpy femininity." Similarly, Roger Ebert wrote Snow White and the Seven Dwarfs was "not so much about Snow White as it was about the Seven Dwarfs and the Evil Queen," opining this was the reason it has remained "the ultimate animated masterpiece" by 2001 instead of having been forgotten soon after its premiere in 1937.

Individualist feminist Camille Paglia said that she used to be transfixed by this "temperamental diva bitch", due to the contrast with the ideal of womanhood that she had been presented to as a child: "Mary, this silent mother; and here was the witch queen who has this weird dialogue in the mirror and it didn't have to be charitable and it didn't have to be nice. I thought she was fabulous." Likewise, Lana Parrilla, who later herself played the Evil Queen in Once Upon A Time, said that whenever she watched Disney's Snow White as a young girl she rooted for and "loved the evil queen―every time the evil queen came on, I was like 'OK!' She was just so fascinating to me." Author Deborah Lipp wrote: "As I've said before and will doubtless say again, given a choice of being Snow White (helpless, sweet, voiceless) and the Wicked Queen, with the cool castle and the magic and the minions, give me my Magic Mirror now!" Film director John Waters said he too rooted for the evil queen to win, and Chay Yew said that if he were a Disney character, he would be the evil queen from Snow White. Stephen Hunter included her being "cool" among the "wonderful truths about Snow White."

Once Upon the Time co-creator Adam Horowitz said that his earliest Disney memory was seeing a re-release of Disney's Snow White when he was "terrified by the Evil Queen while also being unable to look away and that stuck with me through the years." Similarly, fashion designer and Angelina Jolie's Maleficent collaborator Stella McCartney said: "My favorite Disney film was Snow White. I remember growing up watching [it] and being completely freaked out by that scene where the evil queen becomes the old witch and she makes the poison apple." Film maker and actor Terry Gilliam listed the film's Queen among his eight favourite villains, commenting how "truly strange" is that "vanity and beauty are what she's all about, yet the identity she assumes when she becomes the old beggar woman is practically the ugliest in all the kingdom."

Fairy tale lecturer Jack Zipes alike noted that "it is somewhat strange that the queen believes the mirror, for the picture of Snow White reveals that she is a pretty pubescent red-cheeked ordinary girl while the queen is a stunning beautiful mature woman who might easily win a beauty contest." According to feminist analysis essay "The Poisonous Apple in Snow White: Disney's Kingdom of Gender" by English literature professor Brenda Ayres, "the film promotes any source of female empowerment as evil" and "gender conformity through indictments against rebellious women." Ayres interpreted the Queen's odd vulnerability at the end, when she flees in fear and cannot defend herself with magic means, as being in accordance to the film's perceived message of how the only real power of women comes solely from their youthful looks: "without being the fairest one, she had no power whatsoever of her own and there was no knight, prince, king, or other male to come to her rescue."

Jim Lentz, Director of Animation Art at Heritage Auctions, said in 2015: "The Evil Queen is, to this day, one of the great villains of cinema, and she was at her terrifying best when she became the Old Hag and set off to destroy Snow White." According to film maker and actor Brad Bird, back in 1937 "they had to re-upholster the seats in a very large movie palace in New York because little kids were peeing on the seats when the witch came on in Snow White." The Queen ranked as tenth in the American Film Institute's 2003 list of the 50 Best Movie Villains of All Time, being the highest-ranked animated villain. When Walt Disney Parks and Resorts held their 2011 Disney Villains popularity poll for Wicked Gooey Apple Awards (named after the Queen's poison apple), the Evil Queen came first and won in three out of five categories: "Sinister Stylings" (for the most fashionable villain), "Curses! Foiled Again!" (for the villain who received the best comeuppance), and the ultimate "Unfairest of Them All" (for the most evil villain). Jeff Kurtti's 2005 book Disney Villains: The Top Secret Files ranks her as "the greatest villain of them all". The Evil Queen has also been often included on top lists of best villains by various publications. (Note: In 2013, for instance, the Queen was among the 20 terrifying kids' movie characters by Digital Spy, commenting that "Julia Roberts and Charlize Theron may have taken a stab at this role in two competing 2012 blockbusters, but they didn't get anywhere near the kind of creepiness of Disney's evil Queen," as well as among ten scariest Disney villains of all time by entertainment.ie. In 2014, E! ranked "the original head bitch in charge" as the seventh top Disney Villain. Nerdist put the Disney Villainesses "starting in 1937 with the Evil Queen" at top spot in a 2015 ranking of "most bad ass" female villains in pop culture, while Gay Times ranked her third among the "top five wicked women of Disney" and MTV listed her as one of the nine Disney Villains who were "way better than the good guys." That same year, Moviepilot included her among the seven most terrifying and evil Disney Villains as "she may be the prettiest woman in the list, but sadly, that beautiful facade covers an ugly and wicked soul," while Gulf News, ranking her as the second greatest Disney Villain, commented she "still stands today - 78 years after the release of the first movie," as the most evil personality that Disney has ever created. Moviepilot also proposed "Disney could give Snow White the Maleficent treatment and make a version telling the story through the Evil Queen’s perspective," suggesting she should be played by Megan Fox. In 2016, The Frisky described her and Maleficent as "two of the best-realized female villains in movie history.")

=== Cultural impact ===
According to Maria Tatar, an academic specializing in children's literature, the film turned "the evil queen into a figure of gripping narrative energy and makes Snow White [the character] so dull that she requires a supporting cast of seven to enliven her scenes. Ultimately it is the stepmother's disruptive, disturbing, and divisive presence that invests the film with a degree of fascination that has facilitated its widespread circulation and that has allowed it to take such powerful hold in our own culture." Alan Charles Kors and Edward Peter credited the Queen's character's influence in changing the popular visual image of witches in film and other fiction as specifically female, more often young and attractive than old and ugly, and dressed in a characteristically defining costume. A part of Maila Nurmi's inspiration for her character of Vampira came from Nurmi being fascinated by the Queen after watching Disney's Snow White at the age of 14. When she was cast for the 1939's The Wizard of Oz as the Wicked Witch of the West, Gale Sondergaard (who herself has earlier served as one of inspirations for Disney) insisted on playing a glamorous vision of the character, similar to the Disney's interpretation of the Queen from Snow White; when Sondergaard's idea was rejected by producers Mervyn LeRoy and Arthur Freed in favor of making the Wicked Witch ugly, she withdrew from the project and Margaret Hamilton was cast instead. Still, the similarities between the two films, including the portrayals on their respective witch characters, were such that The Wizard of Oz was at one point advertised as "Snow White with live actors."

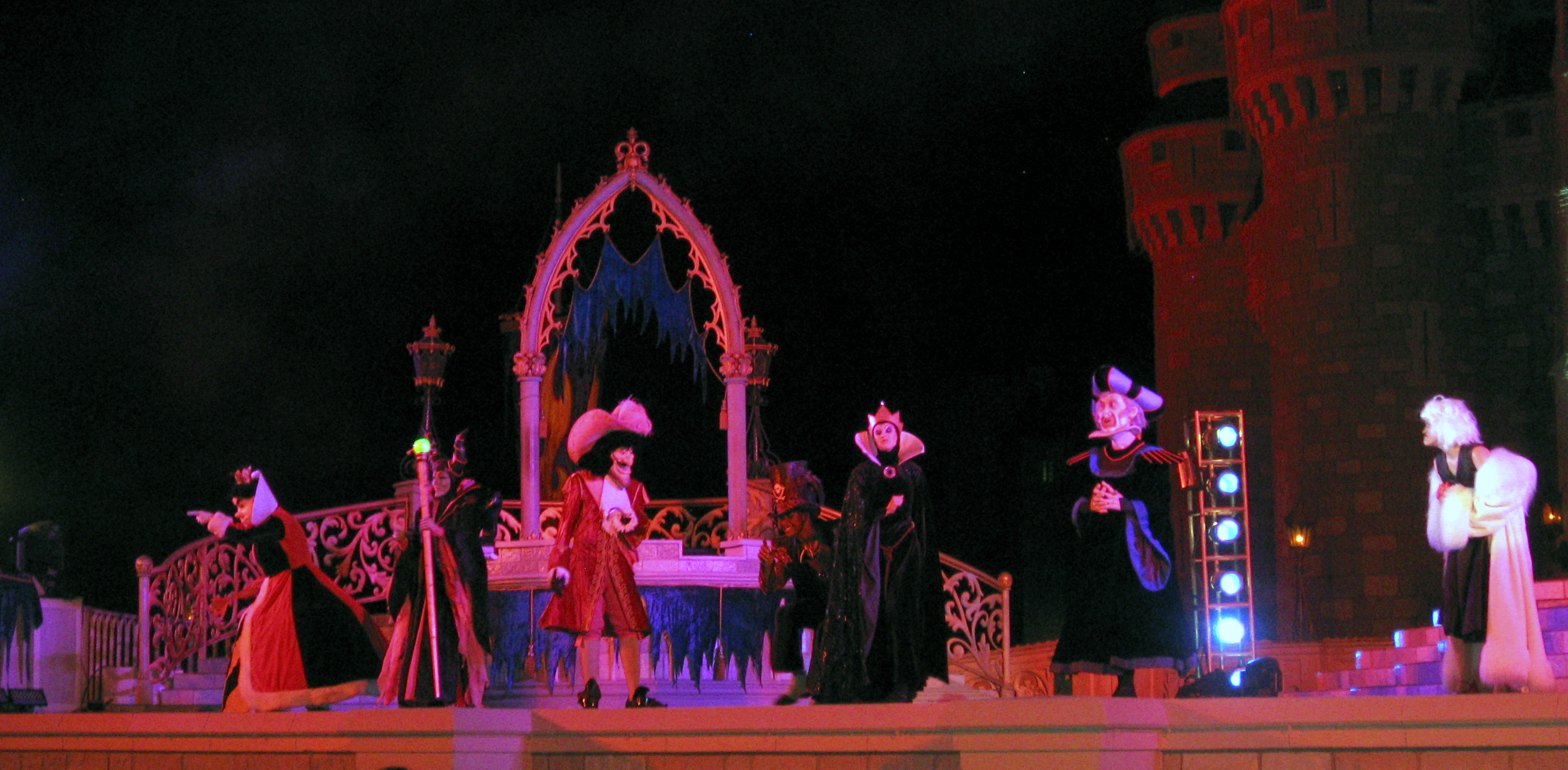
The Evil Queen with several other Disney villains, including Maleficent and the Queen of Hearts at Magic Kingdom in 2011

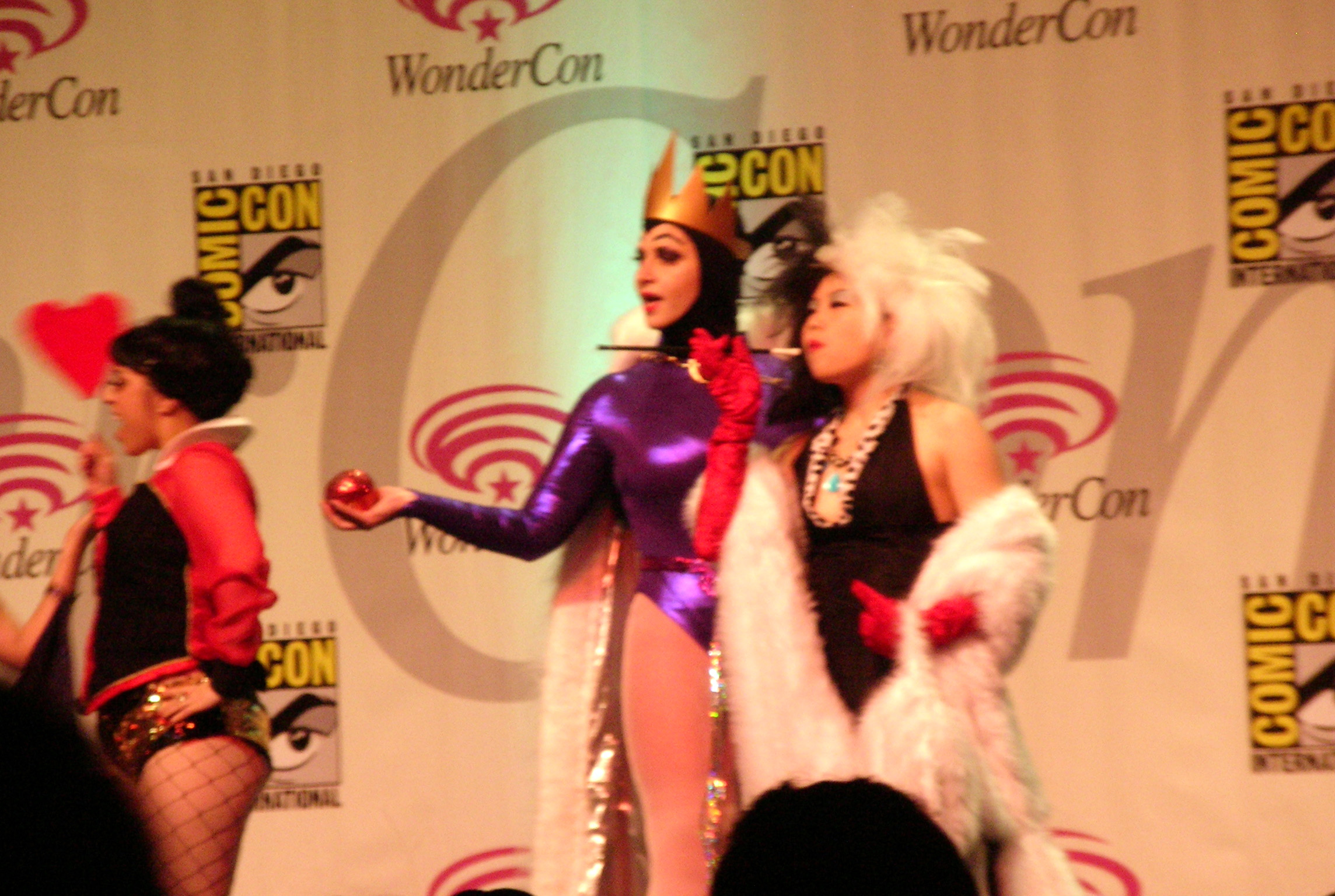
The "Disney Villainess Squad" cosplayers at WonderCon 2010

An official Disney.com blog Oh My Disney stated the Evil Queen has been "the original Disney villain, and we’re really not exaggerating." According to The Daily Telegraph, La Verne's role as the Queen "was credited as the model for such future villains as Ursula in The Little Mermaid (1989) and Scar in The Lion King (1994)." Maleficent from Sleeping Beauty inherited a number of characteristics from the Evil Queen, including the cowl, high collar, billowing cloak, arched eyebrows, cruel lips, and raven familiar. An abandoned concept from Snow White was that the Queen kidnap the Prince and lock him in her dungeon; similarly, in Sleeping Beauty, Maleficent kidnaps Prince Philip. Lady Bane, a vain evil sorceress from Disney's Adventures of the Gummi Bears, too bears a similarity to the Evil Queen in her costume and character. Four wicked witches of the East, West, North and South, resembling the Witch from Disney's Snow White, are also the villains Mickey has to kill to save Disneyland in 1988's Mickey Mouse: The Computer Game. The first names for the magic-wielding antagonist couple The Glooms in Disney XD's own series The 7D (2014) ― set in a timeframe before the Seven Dwarfs first met Snow White ― might have been inspired by the Evil Queen character's alternate name "Grimhilde", with the bumbling warlock husband named "Grim" and the determined witch wife named "Hildy".

The Queen's character design from the film was used in some other Snow White adaptations, such as for the Queen in the Turkish film Pamuk Prenses ve Yedi Cüceler (1970). Queen Naga in Italian erotic comic books Biancaneve was at first loosely based on the Disney version, as was its Snow White's character. When Filmation announced their own animated sequel to the fairy tale, the studio was sued by Disney until Filmation promised their characters would not resemble the ones from the Disney film. The settlement specifically stated there could not be a "wicked witch" character appearing in the film, which instead was made to feature the Queen's brother in a vendetta to avenge her death, and the title was changed from Snow White in the Land of Doom to Happily Ever After.

The Queen also inspired main antagonist characters in the otherwise unrelated titles, such as the stepmother queen in the Russian animated film The Wild Swans (1962), the Witch Queen in the Mexican film Tom Thumb and Little Red Riding Hood (1962), the goddess Venus in the anime version of Unico, Queen Admira in the American film The Hugga Bunch (1985), and the queen of the witches in the video game Curse of Enchantia (1992). Lady Macbeth's rendition in Orson Welles' 1948 Macbeth resembles the Queen in her costume, make-up, and even the manner of her death; Lady Macbeth was also visually based on the Queen in a 1982 comic book adaptation. The evil Queen Bavmorda from 1988's film Willow bears a resemblance so much that Cinefantastique editor Frederick S. Clarke described her as "simply Snow White's Wicked Queen, right down to her hooded costume." Robin Wood has drawn a connection between the looks of the Witch and of the Emperor in the Star Wars franchise (which eventually became a Disney property too). According to video game designer Steve Brown, the Queen's old Witch form served as an inspiration for the main character Witch Queen in his 1985 game Cauldron. Brigitte Nielsen said she based her role as the Black Witch (who also kidnaps a prince character out of jealously for a princess) in the 1992 Italian film Fantaghirò 2 on Disney's "Grimilde" (the Queen's name in Italian comics).

The Queen's castle has been used prominently in the advertising of the film (acting as the backdrop of the film's poster). Later Disney fairy tales, including Cinderella, Sleeping Beauty, The Little Mermaid, Beauty and the Beast and Aladdin, feature similarly fantastical castles and palaces, and often these buildings act as centerpieces or backdrops for the movies' posters. A fairy tale castle stands at the centre of each Disney theme park, and the image of the castle is used in the logo for Buena Vista International.

=== Homage cameos and parodies ===
The character has also made several parodic cameo and homage appearances in non-Disney media. In the 1945 radio program This Is My Best, the Queen uttered a curse so dreadful that the Magic Mirror shattered into a thousand pieces and where the Queen once stood was nothing but a heap of ashes from which black spiders crawled and scuffled off into the night. In Woody Allen's live-action film Annie Hall (1977), Alvy mentions that when he saw Disney's Snow White, he was attracted to the Queen while all the other children had a crush on Snow White. This is followed by an animated sequence of the Wicked Queen, resembling Annie and voiced by Diane Keaton, talking to the cartoon version of the daydreaming Alvy, but turns out that even the Queen scolds him; Alvy attributes it to her having her period mood, to which the Queen reminds him she is just a cartoon character.

The Queen was referenced when she appeared as a villain in an issue of Italian horror comic book series Dylan Dog in 1988. In The Simpsons episode "Four Great Women and a Manicure" (2009), the Queen escapes the dwarves after poisoning Snow White, only to be lynched by a mob of angry woodland creatures. In the short film Welcome to the Club (2022), the Queen appears in her witch form along with other Disney villains. She also appears in the following short films May the 12th Be with You and The Most Wonderful Time of the Year (both 2024). In the U.S. Acres two-part cartoon "Snow Wade and the 77 Dwarves", Lanolin appears as the Wicked Queen with a costume is based on the Disney version. In the Family Guy 2009 episode "Road to the Multiverse", Herbert appears as the disguised Queen. The Muppet Show character Miss Piggy is the Queen in the 2010 parody comic book miniseries Muppet Snow White. Cassie Scerbo played the Evil Queen in the 2013 YouTube parody music video Cell Block Tango. The Queen also appears in Counting Scars, Oh My Disney's Halloween 2014 parody music video of OneRepublic's "Counting Stars". Kimberly Cole played the Evil Queen in Todrick Hall's 2014 parody music video Snow White and the Seven Thugs. A clip of the Queen as the Witch is featured in the credits sequence of the 2024 Marvel Cinematic Universe (MCU) television Disney+ miniseries Agatha All Along (2024), with Jennifer "Jen" Kale (played by Sasheer Zamata) also dressed up as the Witch in the fourth witch trial in the episode "Death's Hand in Mine".

== See also ==
- The Queen from "Snow White" in the original fairy tale, and in other derivative works
