= Anne Francine =

American actress and cabaret singer (1917–1999)

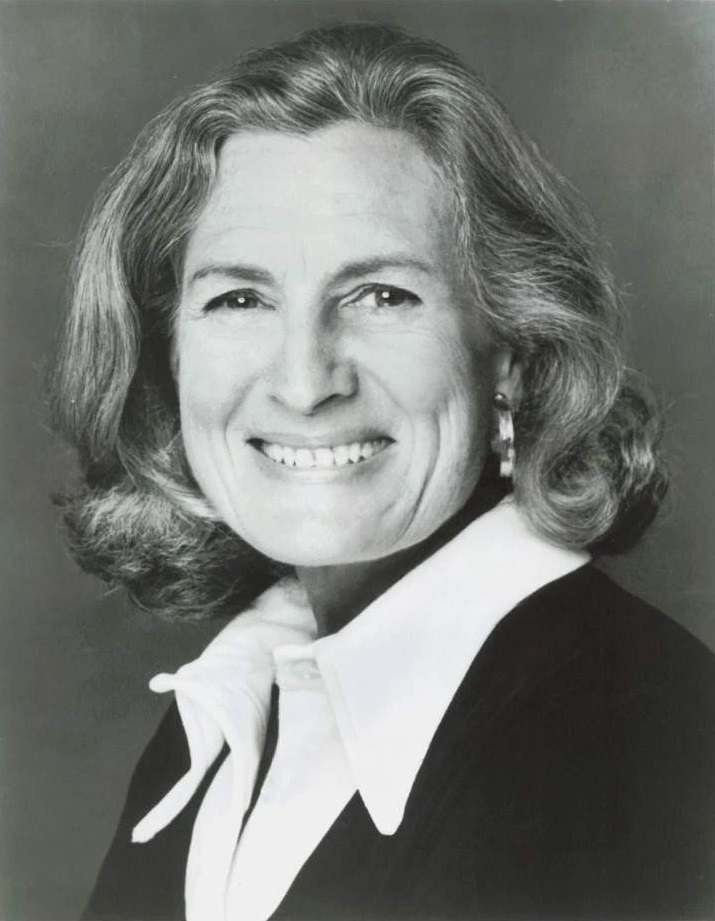
- Francine in 1976
- Born: Anne Hollingshead Francine; August 8, 1917; Atlantic City, New Jersey, U.S.
- Died: December 3, 1999 (aged 82); Lawrence and Memorial Hospital, New London, Connecticut, U.S.
- Resting place: Laurel Hill Cemetery, Philadelphia, Pennsylvania, U.S.
- Occupations: Actress, singer
- Years active: 1954–1988

Anne Hollingshead Francine (August 8, 1917 – December 3, 1999) was an American actress and cabaret singer.

== Biography ==
Anne Hollingshead Francine was born on August 8, 1917, in Atlantic City Hospital in Atlantic City, New Jersey, to Mr. and Mrs. Albert P. Francine of Philadelphia. She was raised in the Main Line region of suburban Philadelphia. When Francine was 10 years old, she was rescued from her grandfather's burning house in Edgewater Park, New Jersey. A neighbor saw flames, broke a window, and alerted the family. When they assembled outside they realized that Francine was missing from the group. The neighbor went into the house and found her "bewildered and choking in her bedroom". She graduated from Chatham Hall in Chatham, Virginia, where she was president of the Dramatic Club.

Francine's debut came on October 12, 1935. She won an amateur singing contest and began performing as a cabaret singer in the 1930s at the Coq Rouge. Francine, who was trying to find a job, entered the contest after being encouraged to do so by friends. Her performance of "Night and Day" and a French song resulted in a four-week engagement at the club beginning on November 15, 1938. Other notable engagements included the Copacabana and the Algonquin. She sang abroad in London and Paris in the 1940s. Her signature songs were The Lamp is Low and Raggedy Ann.

She made her Broadway debut in 1954 with Shirley Booth in By the Beautiful Sea. She stepped in for Bea Arthur as Vera Charles in the 1966 Broadway production of Mame, starring Angela Lansbury. She and Lansbury reprised their characters in the 1983 revival. She last appeared on Broadway in 1987 as Mrs. Harcourt in the Lincoln Center revival of Anything Goes, starring Patti LuPone.

She portrayed the role of villain Flora Simpson Reilly in the American television series Harper Valley PTA.

In 1979, she starred as the Evil Queen in the musical adaption of the 1937 animated film Snow White and the Seven Dwarfs.

In 1988 Francine portrayed Mrs. Evangeline Harcourt in a revival of Anything Goes at Lincoln Center. During that run she had a cabaret act in the Algonquin Hotel's Oak Room.

Her film work included Fellini's Juliet of the Spirits (1965), Stand Up and Be Counted (1972), Savages (1972), and Crocodile Dundee (1986).

She taught cabaret singers at the Eugene O'Neill Theatre Center in Waterford, Connecticut even after losing her ability to speak after a stroke in 1992.

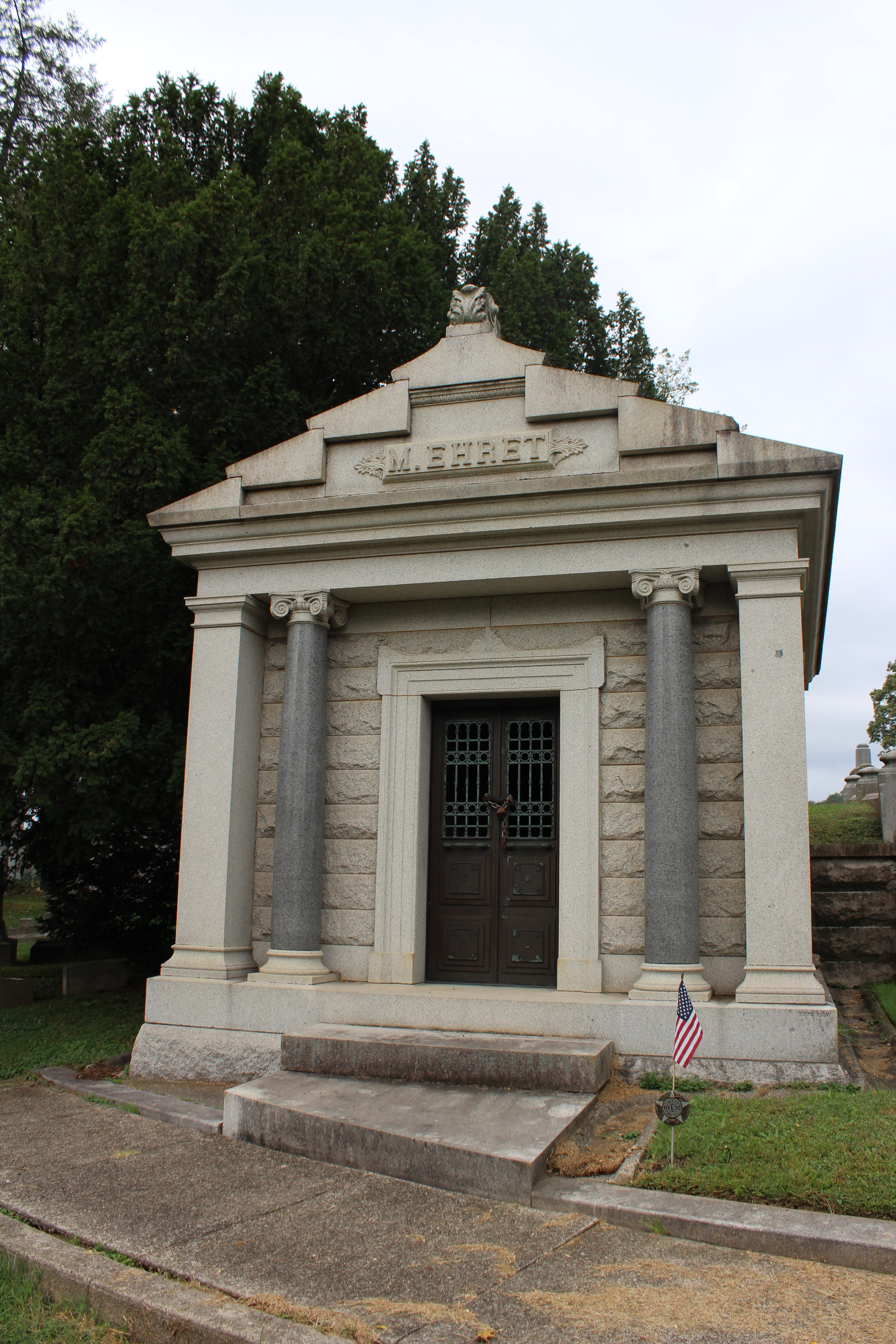
Francine is interred in the Michael Ehret mausoleum in Laurel Hill Cemetery

She died in a Connecticut hospital on December 3, 1999, after suffering a stroke and was interred in the Michael Ehret mausoleum on "Millionaire's Row" at Laurel Hill Cemetery in Philadelphia.

== Filmography ==
Year	Title	Role	Notes
1965	Juliet of the Spirits	Psychodramatist	
1972	Stand Up and Be Counted	Mabel Hammond	
1972	Mission Impossible	Maude Brophy	TV Episode: "Committed"
1972	Savages	Carlotta, a Hostess	
1986	Crocodile Dundee	Fran	
