= Stand Up and Be Counted =

1972 film by Jackie Cooper

- Film poster
- Directed by: Jackie Cooper
- Written by: Bernard Slade
- Produced by: M. J. Frankovich
- Starring: Jacqueline Bisset; Stella Stevens; Steve Lawrence; Gary Lockwood; Lee Purcell
- Cinematography: Fred J. Koenekamp
- Edited by: Harold F. Kress
- Music by: Ernie Wilkins
- Production company: Frankovich Productions
- Distributed by: Columbia Pictures
- Release date: May 12, 1972
- Running time: 99 minutes
- Country: United States
- Language: English

Stand Up and Be Counted is a 1972 American comedy film directed by Jackie Cooper and starring Jacqueline Bisset and Stella Stevens. It features the recording of "I Am Woman" (1971) by Helen Reddy.

== Plot ==
Shelia (Jacqueline Bisset) is sent, by her editor, to her home town, Boulder, Colorado, to write about Women's Liberation, because she is a Woman; and, he assumes that "Women's Libbers won't talk to men".

Shelia's Mother, Mabel (Anne Francine), and her Sister, Karen (Lee Purcell), are very involved in The Women's Liberation Movement.

Karen organizes meetings, arranging for Dr. Joyce Brothers to speak to a diverse group of housewives; lesbians; hookers; and, different ethnicities.

This inspires housewife Hilary (Loretta Swit) and trophy wife Yvonne (Stella Stevens) and others to change; tired of being treated as sex objects, by their husbands; and, as second-class citizens.

The women decide to "Stand Up and Be Counted", staging protests to garner media attention, including disrupting a Playboy spokesman, Michael Ansara, at a press conference.

Whether the men in the women's lives will accept or even understand these changes; or, feel that they can afford to, in the face of The 1970s Recessions is another question.

But, Lou (Héctor Elizondo) says they "can try".

== Cast ==
- Jacqueline Bisset - Sheila Hammond
- Stella Stevens - Yvonne Kellerman
- Steve Lawrence - Gary McBride
- Gary Lockwood - Eliot Travis
- Lee Purcell - Karen Hammond
- Loretta Swit - Hilary McBride
- Héctor Elizondo - Lou Kellerman
- Anne Francine - Mabel Hammond
- Madlyn Rhue - Gloria Seagar
- Alex Wilson - Jerry Kamanski
- Michael Ansara - Playboy Speaker
- Joyce Brothers - Herself
- Jessica Rains - Sadie
- Meredith Baxter - Tracy

== Reception ==
Anne Bennett, writing for Big Mama Rag, in 1973, wrote that, "The storyline is stereotypically simple..." And, "it's clumsiness" is at times "embarrassing" or even "degrading". But, concluded, "you will leave feeling excited".,

The New York Times review, July 20, 1972, said, "'Stand Up and Be Counted' erratically skips between comedy and serious causes with somewhat less than impressive impact either way."

== See also ==
- List of American films of 1972
