= The Most Wonderful Time of the Year (2024 film) =

2024 American animated short film

- Promotional poster
- Directed by: David Silverman
- Written by: J. Stewart Burns; Dan Greaney; Broti Gupta; Al Jean
- Based on: The Simpsons by Matt Groening
- Production companies: Gracie Films; 20th Television Animation
- Distributed by: Disney+ (Disney Platform Distribution)
- Release date: October 11, 2024
- Running time: 2 minutes
- Country: United States

The Most Wonderful Time of the Year is an animated short film based on the American television series The Simpsons. The short was first released on October 11, 2024, in the United States, on Disney+. It follows the murderous villain Sideshow Bob (Kelsey Grammer), as he, joined by other antagonists spanning multiple franchises, spread mayhem around the town of Springfield. Directed by David Silverman, and written by Al Jean, J. Stewart Burns, Dan Greaney, and Broti Gupta, it is the ninth Simpsons Disney+ short film overall.

The short was conceived with Grammer and Sideshow Bob in mind, and includes multiple references to Disney properties and franchises, notably their villain characters, such as Agatha Harkness, who was added to reference the then–recent series Agatha All Along. To not interfere with the upcoming Christmas special, "O C'mon All Ye Faithful", and still parody the Christmas song "It's the Most Wonderful Time of the Year", it was decided to center the short around Halloween. A gag of Sideshow Bob stepping on a rake—which has been featured in The Simpsons multiple times—ends off the short. The scene intentionally refers to it as a "tired gag", a line suggested by Silverman, and was made to be an indicator that the gag would be retired following the short.

Upon release, The Most Wonderful Time of the Year received positive reviews from critics for CinemaBlend and Comic Book Resources, who highlighted the humor and unique handling of the Halloween season.

== Cast ==
- Nancy Cartwright as Bart Simpson and Nelson Muntz
- Chris Edgerly as Santa Claus doll
- Tress MacNeille as Evil Queen
- Kelsey Grammer as Sideshow Bob
- Maurice LaMarche as Amos Slade, Darth Vader, and Thanos

== Plot ==
As the Simpson family are tied up on their couch, the antagonistic Sideshow Bob talks to the audience in a fourth wall break about his love for the Halloween season. Despite Bart begging him not to, Sideshow Bob sings a parody of "It's the Most Wonderful Time of the Year" about Halloween, and is joined by multiple other antagonists from The Simpsons, Disney, and several other franchises, including Thanos, Captain Hook, Palpatine, and many others. Eventually, Bart joins in, with his friend Loki, as the villains all cause mayhem around Springfield.

== Production ==
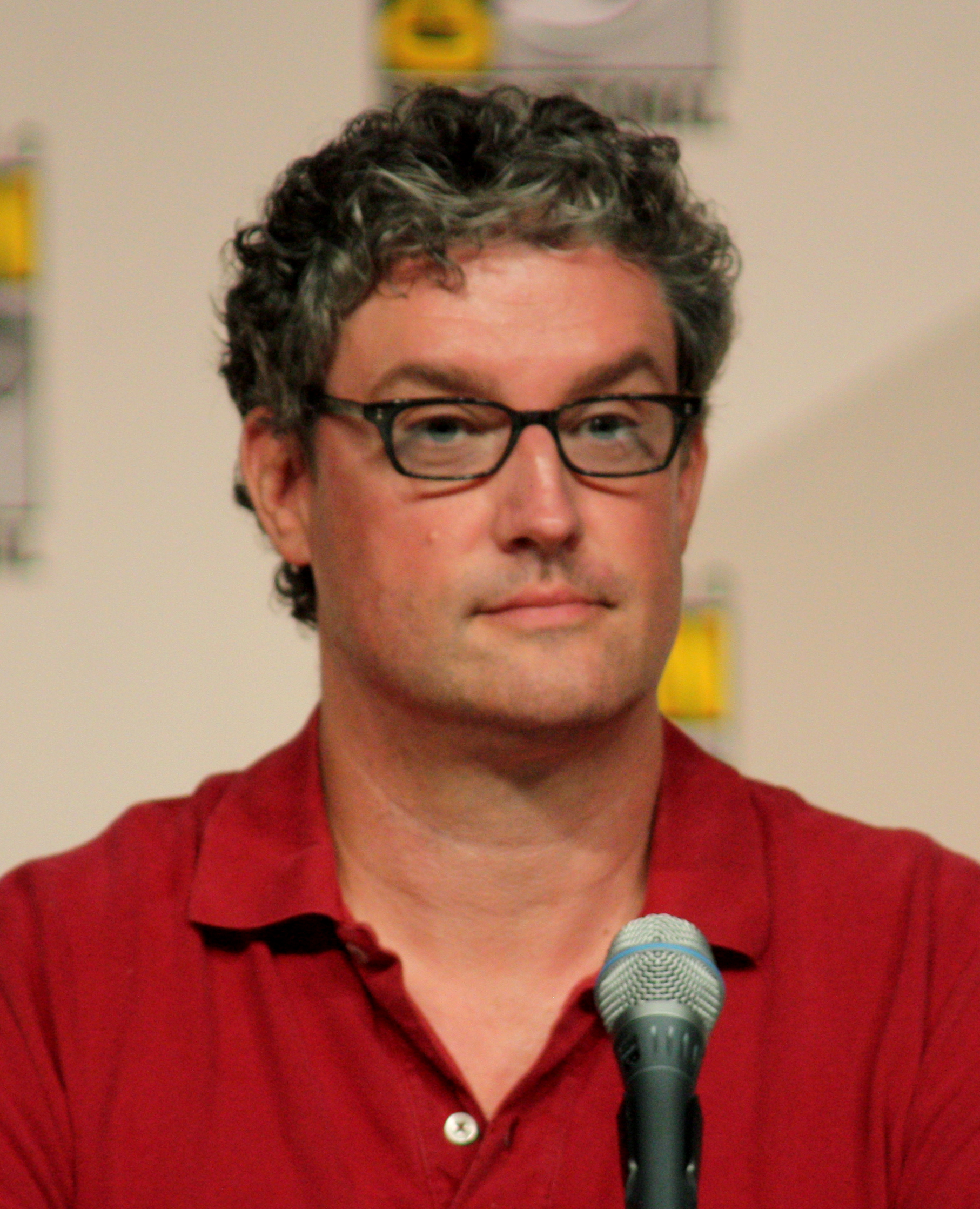
The short was written by series executive producer Al Jean, alongside several other writers.

The Most Wonderful Time of the Year was directed by David Silverman, and written by Al Jean, J. Stewart Burns, Dan Greaney, and Broti Gupta. The short was first announced in a tweet on September 18, 2024, revealing the premise and a release date of October 11. Kelsey Grammer guest stars as the short's main character, Sideshow Bob. It was the ninth short released on the streaming service Disney+ to be based on The Simpsons, and its animation was handled by the same team that worked on the main series. It was produced by 20th Century Animation and Gracie Films.

Jean, who served as the series' executive producer from season 13 through 33, revealed in an interview with Inverse that the idea to center the short on Sideshow Bob came from their goal to make each of the Disney+ shorts unique and "special". Because of this, they decided that using Grammer—who had been working with the series as Sideshow Bob for over 30 years and sang well as the character—for a Halloween parody of the song "It's The Most Wonderful Time of the Year" fit well. The short was themed around Halloween because Jean desired not to do anything Christmas-themed, on account of the fact they already were working on an upcoming double-length Christmas special, "O C'mon All Ye Faithful". Silverman made a list of all the villains he wanted to appear, and the short was written in a "fast day", according to Jean. In the short, Sideshow Bob ends it off by stepping on a rake, which he similarly did in multiple previous episodes of The Simpsons, starting with "Cape Feare". Sideshow Bob remarks, "Tired gag" as he does it, with Jean noting it was added by Silverman as a way to retire the gag altogether from the series, or at least retire it under Jean's jurisdiction.

=== References and parodies ===
A fan of the film Bambi, Jean wanted to include a reference to it in the short, and chose to do one referencing the death of the character's mother in the film, which he later remarked was "crazy" to include. The release of The Most Wonderful Time of the Year coincided with the premiere of the series Agatha All Along, and Jean wished to include the main character, Agatha Harkness, in the short. Not knowing what the plot of the series was, the crew put Agatha generically fighting with two characters from The Simpsons, Patty and Selma, knowing her inclusion would be "a big deal". Coincidentally, Lisa Simpson would later appear in the credits of an episode of Agatha All Along, which Jean enjoyed heavily. Bart's costume in the short served as a homage to the outfit of a character from the film A Clockwork Orange. This continued the series' parodies of Stanley Kubrick's work, and Bart had worn the costume once before in The Simpsons. A line about the Brothers Grimm was incorporated in the song, but the crew could not decide on an ending for it, which was holding up production. After about 20 tries, they settled on one about the Brothers Grimm being an important part of storytelling for Halloween, which allowed them to start work on the short itself.

== Release and reception ==
The Most Wonderful Time of the Year was first released in the United States on October 11, 2024, on Disney+, to celebrate the Halloween season. Melody Day of Comic Book Resources ranked the short film as the second best of the nine Simpsons Disney+ shorts. Day asserted that, despite its short runtime, the short was able to offer a unique take on Halloween that differs from the series' annual Treehouse of Horror specials, as well as praising Grammer's performance. However, Day criticized the "tiresome" amount of media properties owned by Disney featured in the short, ultimately recommending it for casual viewers instead of "avid fans" of The Simpsons. CinemaBlend's Sarah El-Mahmoud hailed The Most Wonderful Time of the Year as "such a fun short" for its handling of the Halloween season, also highlighting the joke about Bambi's mother dying and the "terrifying" man who did it remaining unknown.
