= Snow White and the Seven Dwarfs (musical) =

- Music: Frank Churchill; Jay Blackton
- Lyrics: Larry Morey; Joe Cook
- Book: Joe Cook
- Basis: Snow White and the Seven Dwarfs by Ted Sears; Richard Creedon; Otto Englander; Dick Rickard; Earl Hurd; Merrill De Maris; Dorothy Ann Blank; Webb Smith
- Productions: 1969 The Muny; 1972 The Muny; 1979 Radio City Music Hall

Snow White and the Seven Dwarfs is a musical with music and lyrics by Frank Churchill and Larry Morey, and additional music and lyrics by Jay Blackton and Joe Cook, and book by Cook. Adapted from the Disney 1937 animated film Snow White and the Seven Dwarfs – which in turn had been based on the Grimm's fairy tale "Snow White" – it is about a princess banished from her kingdom by her vain stepmother, and she comes to live with seven dwarfs in their woodland home.

First produced in 1969, the show carries much of the film's score over, by Churchill and Morey, along with four new songs by Blackton and Cook. It ran a total of 106 performances.

== Productions ==
The stage adaptation was originally created at The Muny in St. Louis in 1969 and was repeated there in 1972.

A production opened at the Radio City Music Hall on October 18, 1979, and closed a month later, after 38 performances, in order for Radio City to put on the Radio City Christmas Spectacular (went up November 25, 1979, to and closed after 91 performances on January 6, 1980).

Snow White went on a brief tour with stops in Chicago and Washington, D.C., and then re-opened on January 11, 1980, and closed after 68 performances on March 9, 1980, a total of 106 performances.

A live video recording premiered on HBO on December 14, 1980 and was briefly available on VHS and Betamax from Walt Disney Home Video in the summer of 1981.

== Cast and crew ==
The show was directed and choreographed by Frank Wagner, produced by Robert F. Jani, executive musical director Donald Pippin, scenery by John William Keck, costumes by Frank Spencer, lighting by Ken Billington, conducted by Don Smith, orchestrations by Philip J. Lang, Queen's presentation music arrangement by Ronald Melrose, masks and animal costumes by Joe Stephen, choral arrangements Jay Blackton, Don Pippen, production stage manager Jeff Hamlin, stage manager Neil Miller, and press by Gifford/Wallace, Deborah Morgenthal.

Cast

Character	Actor
Snow White	Mary Jo Salerno
Prince Charming	Richard Bowne
The Queen	Anne Francine
The Witch; The Mirror	Charles Edward Hall
Doc	Don Potter
Grumpy	Benny Freigh
Happy	Richard Day
Bashful	Jay Edward Allen
Sneezy	Louis Carry
Sleepy	Jerry Riley
Dopey	Michael E. King
Huntsman	Bruce Sherman
The King	Thomas Ruisinger
Luna	Yolande Bavan
Greta	Heidi Coe
Mother	Lauren Lipson
Chamberlain	David Pursley

== Musical numbers ==
- Overture
- "Welcome to the Kingdom" – Company
- "Queen's Presentation" – Company
- "I'm Wishing" – Snow White, Greta, Villagers
- "One Song" – Prince Charming
- "With a Smile and a Song" – Snow White, Animals
- "Whistle While You Work" – Snow White, Animals
- "Heigh-Ho" – Seven Dwarfs
- "Bluddle-Uddle-Um-Dum (The Washing Song)" – Seven Dwarfs
- "Will I Ever See Her Again" – Prince Charming
- "The Dwarfs' Yodel Song (The Silly Song)" – Snow White, Seven Dwarfs, Animals
- "Someday My Prince Will Come" – Snow White
- "Heigh-Ho (Reprise)" – Seven Dwarfs
- "Here's the Happy Ending" – Company
