= 8th Hollywood Music in Media Awards =

US film music awards ceremony in 2017

- Date: 17 November 2017
- Location: Avalon Hollywood, Hollywood
- Website: www.hmmawards.com

The 8th Hollywood Music in Media Awards was held on November 17, 2017 to recognize the best in music in film, TV, video games, commercials, and trailers.

== Winners and nominees ==
Original Score — Feature Film	Original Score — Sci-Fi/Fantasy/Horror Film
Oneohtrix Point Never - Good Time; Nicholas Britell - Battle of the Sexes; Carter Burwell - Wonderstruck; Mychael Danna - The Man Who Invented Christmas; Tamar-kali - Mudbound; Dario Marianelli - Darkest Hour; Thomas Newman - Victoria & Abdul	Alexandre Desplat - The Shape of Water; Michael Abels - Get Out; Marco Beltrami - Logan; Rupert Gregson-Williams - Wonder Woman; Mark Mothersbaugh - Thor: Ragnarok; Benjamin Wallfisch & Hans Zimmer - Blade Runner 2049
Original Score — Animated Film	Original Score — Documentary
Michael Giacchino - Coco; Lorne Balfe - The Lego Batman Movie; Clint Mansell - Loving Vincent; Theodore Shapiro - Captain Underpants: The First Epic Movie; Hans Zimmer and Steve Mazzaro- The Boss Baby	Philip Glass - Jane; Jeff Beal - Boston; Danny Bensi & Saunder Jurriaans- LA 92; Blake Neely - The Keepers: "The Conclusion"; Dan Romer and Saul Simon MacWilliams- Chasing Coral; Duncan Thum, Sebastian Örnemark and Steve Gernes - Chef's Table
Original Song - Feature Film	Original Song — Sci-Fi/Fantasy/Horror Film
"Stand Up for Something" from Marshall - Written by Diane Warren, Common; Performed by Andra Day, featuring Common; "I Don't Wanna Live Forever" from Fifty Shades Darker - Written by Taylor Swift, Sam Dew and Jack Antonoff; Performed by Taylor Swift & Zayn Malik; "If I Dare" from Battle of the Sexes - Written by Sara Bareilles and Nicholas Britell; Performed by Sara Bareilles; "Mighty River" from Mudbound - Written by Mary J. Blige, Raphael Saadiq and Taura Stinson; Performed by Mary J. Blige; "The Promise" The Promise - Written and Performed Chris Cornell; "This Is Me" from The Greatest Showman - Written by Benj Pasek & Justin Paul; Performed by Keala Settle	"How Does a Moment Last Forever" from Beauty and the Beast - Written by Alan Menken & Tim Rice; Performed by Celine Dion and Emma Watson; "Evermore" from Beauty and the Beast - Written by Alan Menken & Tim Rice; Performed by Josh Groban; "Guardian's Inferno" from Guardians of the Galaxy Vol. 2 - The Sneepers featuring David Hasselhoff; "Keep Your Eyes On Me" from The Shack - Written and performed by Tim McGraw and Faith Hill
Original Song — Animated Film	Original Song — Documentary
"Confident" from Leap! - Written by Demi Lovato, Ilya Salmanzadeh, Max Martin and Savan Kotecha; Performed by Demi Lovato; "Captain Underpants Theme Song" from Captain Underpants: The First Epic Movie - Written and performed by "Weird Al" Yankovic; "How Does a Moment Last Forever" from Beauty and the Beast - Written by Alan Menken and Tim Rice; Performed by Céline Dion; "I'm a Lady" from Smurfs: The Lost Village - Written by Meghan Trainor & Martin Rene; Performed by Meghan Trainor; "There's Something Special" from Despicable Me 3 - Written and performed by Pharrell Williams; "You Will Always Find Me in Your Heart" from Smurfs: The Lost Village - Written by Christopher Lennertz & KT Tunstall; Performed by Shaley Scott	"Jump" from Step - Written by Laura Karpman, Raphael Saadiq, & Taura Stinson; Performed by Cynthia Erivo; "Dancing Through the Wreckage" from Served Like a Girl - Written by Pat Benatar, Neil Giraldo & Linda Perry; Performed by Pat Benatar; "Prayers for This World" from Cries from Syria - Written by Diane Warren; Performed by Cher with The West Los Angeles Children's Choir; "Tell Me How Long" from Chasing Coral - Written by Dan Romer and Teddy Geiger; Performed by Teddy Geiger; "Truth To Power" from An Inconvenient Sequel: Truth to Power - Written by Ryan Tedder & T Bone Burnett; Performed by OneRepublic; "Two Fingers of Whiskey" from The American Epic Sessions - Written by Bernie Taupin; Composed and performed by Elton John, T Bone Burnett and Jack White
Music Documentary/Special Program	Soundtrack Album
Clive Davis: The Soundtrack of Our Lives - Directed by Chris Perkel; Original Music by Paul S. Henning; Eagles of Death Metal: Not Amis - Directed by Colin Hanks; Produced by Heather Parry, Sean M. Stuart; Gaga: Five Foot Two - Directed by Chris Moukarbel; Produced by Heather Parry, Chris Moukarbel, Bobby Campbell; Hired Gun - Directed by Fran Strine; Written by Tim Calandrello and Fran Stine; Original Music by The Crystal Method/Tobias Enhus; Requiem for My Mother - Written & Directed by Stephen Edwards; Co-directed by David Haugland; Original Music by Stephen Edwards; Score: A Film Music Documentary - Written and Directed by Matt Schrader; Original Music by Ryan Taubert; Women Who Score - Directed by Sara Nesson; Produced by Naida Albright and Sara Nesson; Original Music by Lesley Barber, Miriam Cutler, Lili Haydn, Laura Karpman and Starr Parodi	Baby Driver; Beauty and the Beast; Good Time; Guardians of the Galaxy Vol. 2; Served Like a Girl; The Fate of the Furious
Original Score — TV Show/Limited Series	Song/Score - Trailer
Laura Karpman & Raphael Saadiq - Underground; Rupert Gregson-Williams - The Crown; Mateo Messina - Graves; Meshell Ndegeocello - Queen Sugar; Jesse Novak - BoJack Horseman; Dustin O'Halloran - Transparent; Jeff Russo - Fargo; Antonio Sánchez - Get Shorty	Oleksa Lozowchuk - Dead Rising 4; Jeff Broadbent - Realm of Duels; Saul Gomez - Cocktail & Brothers; Mike Raznick - The Handmaid's Tale; Javier Rodríguez Ríos - Unchained; Layal Watfeh - Invasion
Outstanding Music Supervision — Film	Outstanding Music Supervision — Television
Brian Ross - Lady Bird; Matthew Hearon-Smith - The Florida Project; Dave Jordan - Guardians of the Galaxy Vol. 2; Kirsten Lane - Baby Driver; Dana Sano - Fifty Shades Darker	Robin Urdang - The Marvelous Mrs. Maisel; Zach Cowie and Kerri Drootin - Master of None; Nora Felder - Better Things; Rob Lowry - The Bold Type; Season Kent - 13 Reasons Why; Jennifer Pyken - This Is Us
Original Score — Independent Film	Original Song — Independent Film
Corey Allen Jackson - Chuck; Glen Gabriel - Purgatory Road; Nami Melumad - This Day Forward; Layla Minoui - The Mad Whale; Anne Nikitin - This Beautiful Fantastic; Mark Smythe - Unfallen	"Speak to Me" from Voice from the Stone - Written by Amy Lee & Michael Wandmacher; Performed by Amy Lee; "Calling to Me" from One Percent More Humid - Written by Nathan Halpern; Performed by Emily Forsythe; "My Tiredness Hasn't Limit" from The Enchanted - Written by Ivan Ruiz Serrano, Ricardo Davila and Angela Boj; Performed by Angela Boj; "PBNJ" from Patti Cake$ - Written by Jason Binnick & Geremy Jasper; Performed by Siddharth Dhananjay, Danielle Macdonald and Cathy Moriarty
Original Score — Video Game	Original Song — Video Game
Farpoint - Stephen Cox & Danny McIntyre; Deformers - Austin Wintory; Halo Wars 2 - Gordy Haab, Brian Trifon & Brian Lee White; Honor of Kings - Thomas Parisch and Miles Hankins; Total War: Warhammer II - Creative Assembly	"Ocean Over the Time" from Moonlight Blade OL - Thomas Parisch; "Homestead" from Expeditions: Viking - Knut Avenstroup Haugen; "Oh Willamette" from Dead Rising 4 - Oleksa Lozowchuk
Original Score — Short Film	Original Score — Short Film (Foreign Language)
David Longoria - Becoming A Man; Elia Cmíral - Lacrimosa; Pablo P. García - Four; Nicolas Repetto - The Plural of Blood; Jennifer Thomas - Desert Rose	Christoph Zirngibl – König Opa; Ivan Capillas – The Giant and the Mermaid; Josue Vergara – Un Buen Amigo
Original Score — Short Film (Animated)	Independent Music Video
Arturo Cardelús – In a Heartbeat; Stuart Hancock – We're Going on a Bear Hunt; Orlando Perez Rosso – Wishing Box; Germán Ignacio Tello – Lucerna	Alexa Friedman – "Enraptured"; Brian Mackey – "Underwater"; Builder of the House – "There Is No Hourglass, Only Sand"; J.ournal and Jennifer Thomas – "Nine Twelve"; Jerry Jean – "Do We Reach Home"; Marc Daniels – "Summer Song"; Next Door to the Moon – "Situation"; Poetic Lace – "King of the City"; The Sunset Kids – "Fantasy – Living in a Fantasy"; Wouter Kellerman and Soweto Gospel Choir – "Mathebethebeni"

== Career Achievement Honor ==
- Dianne Warren

== Music Genre Nominees and Winners ==
- ADULT CONTEMPORARY
- Alison Lewis
- Catherine Sarah Manna
- Charlie Midnight and Dale Effren
- Elizabeth Butler
- Jerry Jean
- Malynda Hale
- Ships Have Sailed
- Suspect 21
- Wyle

- ALTERNATIVE
- 2 a.m. Orchestra
- Bazerk
- Christine Owman
- Love Ghost
- Nic Nassuet
- Pennan Brae
- Raven Tide
- Stage 11
- The Infinite Seas
- The Siren

- AMERICANA/FOLK/ACOUSTIC
- Builder of the House
- Chuck Murphy
- Flight of Fire
- Grant Maloy Smith
- Katie Garibaldi
- Mark Alan Stansberry
- Michael Fitz
- Piqued Jacks
- Raveis Kole
- Sunshine Stills

- BLUES
- Bobby Messano
- Guitar Shorty
- Michael Barclay
- Trevor Sewell Feat. Tracy Nelson
- Wendy Sweetlove

- CONTEMPORARY CHRISTIAN/GOSPEL
- Angel Sessions
- Cindy Hughlett
- Composer Ann Hamilton Wallace
- DeDe Wedekind
- Elise Lebec
- Gretchen Rhodes
- Matthew Huff

- CONTEMPORARY CLASSICAL
- Alan Storeygard
- Andre Barros
- Arturo Cardelus
- Bill Wren / Frank Ralls
- Danaë Xanthe Vlasse
- Dirk Ehlert
- Francisco Liberia
- Moonkyung Lee
- Paul Henning
- Rita Ciancio
- Yukiko Nishimura
- Stephen Edwards

- COUNTRY
- Charlie Midnight, Buck Johnson & Dale Effren
- Haywireband
- Jeff Silverman and Niclas Lundin
- JessLee
- Kassidy Lynne
- Randall Cohen & Gregory Martindale
- Terri McPhail Chiasson
- The C.R. Ecker Band
- Tiffany Ashton

- DANCE
- April Diamond
- Diana “Dilee” Maher
- Fadi Awad
- Melissa B.
- Mina Koo
- Natalie Jean
- Septimius The Great

- EDM (Electronic Dance Music)
- Aural Imperative
- Fadi Awad & MAC (feat. Gunvor)
- Fatum (feat. Angel Taylor)
- Miss Tara
- Natiive (feat. Gloria Kim)
- Nick Caster

- HOLIDAY
- Aeone
- Antherius
- Emily Drennan & Patti Drennan
- Gail C Bluestone
- J. Carson
- Katie Hardyman
- Kimberly Haynes
- Rob Cariddi
- Ruth Pollack Pappas
- Suzanne Grzanna

- INSTRUMENTAL
- Alberto De La Rocha
- Carmine Pisano – Francesco Farro
- Carol Albert
- Minimalia
- Kento Masuda
- Lynn Yew Evers
- Matias Baconsky
- Mattia Vlad Morleo
- Tim Neumark
- Vito Leonardo Tritto

- JAZZ
- Carlos Mena
- Drivetime
- Geoff Alpert
- Jan Daley
- Kayla Renee
- Lyn Stanley
- Partners In Time
- Roberto Tola
- Syreeta Thompson (Trumpetlady)
- Threestyle feat. Magdalena Chovancova

- LATIN (Pop/Rock/Urban)
- Henry G
- Los Aguas Aguas
- Los Rastrillos
- Mari Nobre
- Natalie Fernandez
- Panteón Rococó

- LATIN (Traditional)
- Debe Gunn, feat. Rafael Cazaras
- Mariachi Divas De Cindy Shea
- Tomborato
- Jesus Alejandro El Nino
- Mariachi la Estrella

- LYRICS/LYRICIST
- Don Grady & Debra Gussin
- Martha Reich
- Mosi Dorbayani

- MESSAGE SONG/SOCIAL IMPACT
- Dennis Sy
- Isolde Fair
- J.ournal and Jennifer Thomas
- Kim Planert & Nikola Bedingfield
- Monti
- Nicki Kris
- OC Hit Factory
- SayReal
- Shylah Ray Sunshine
- Wendy Loomis, Monica Williams, Irina Mikhailova

- NEW AGE/AMBIENT
- Art Tawanghar Feat. Peter Sterling
- Curtis Macdonald
- Darlene Koldenhoven
- Emilia Lopez-Yañez, Art Tawanghar, Ruth Weber
- Jaime Helios
- Jose Luis Salas
- Maturo
- Michel Huygen
- Mirage Of Deep
- Seay and Geoff Koch
- The Wimshurst's Machine

- POP
- Akkira feat. Sabrina Petrini
- Casii Stephan
- Destiny Malibu
- Erick Blu
- Fat Cat Cinema
- K-Syran
- Katie Kei
- Letters From Pluto
- Nina Amelio
- Sara Serena

- R&B/SOUL
- Alyze Elyse
- Armen Balyan
- DW3
- Laura Lavalle
- Mike Decole
- Ryan Martinez, Mike Westbrook, Debra Gussin
- Tracy Cruz

- RAP/HIP HOP
- Block Scholars
- It's Mental
- Jay Stubbs
- Joe Nance
- Juan Cristiani
- LaTruth

- ROCK
- Acting Natural
- Best Not Broken
- Christina Gaudet
- Danny Vash
- Eternally Yours
- Immortelle
- Sin
- Stage Republic
- Valor & Vengeance

- SINGER-SONGWRITER
- Chelsea Williams
- Jayelle
- Joe Taylor
- Lauren Ashlaie
- Lauren Carter
- Rachel Brett
- Raquel Aurilia
- Shaniah Paige
- Stevie Jewel
- Yelpy

- VOCAL (Female)
- Francesca Passero
- Mike Rubino feat. Marie Digby
- Tracy Cruz
- Sharon Little

- VOCAL (Male)
- Jeremy Harrell
- Junior Turner
- Patrick Joseph
- Robot Nature (DPAK Robot)

- WORLD
- Ban Brothers
- Fernando Peña Burson
- Josue Vergara
- Maryama
- Monica Williams
- Murat Ses
- Nuvolution
- Sangpuy's
- Shashika Mooruth
- The Grasslands Ensemble & Daniel Ho
- Tony Chen
- Wouter Kellerman and Soweto Gospel Chior
