= List of awards and nominations received by Tim Rice =

Tim Rice awards and nominations
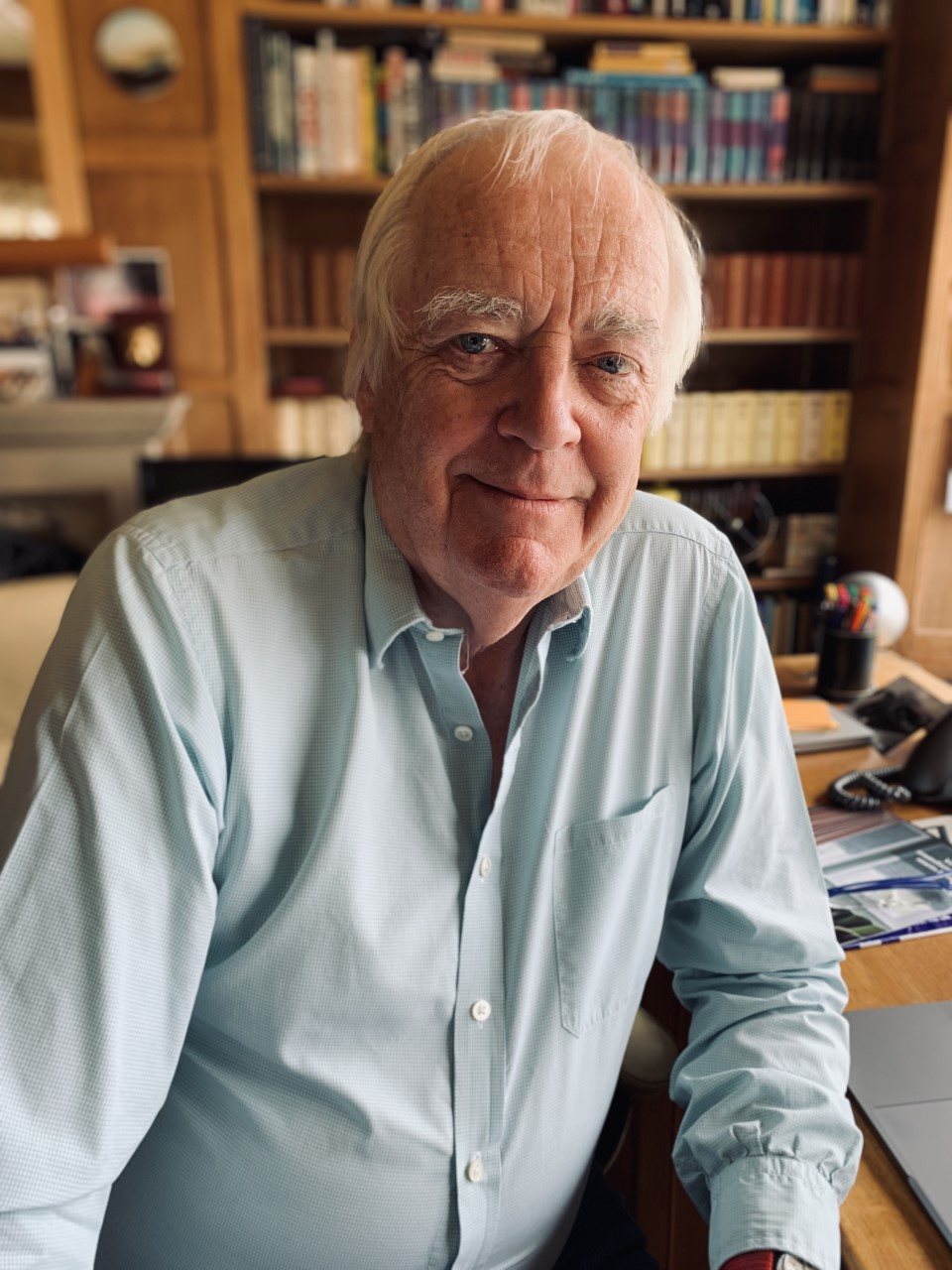
Rice in 2020
Awards and nominations
Award	Wins	Nominations
Totals
Academy Awards	3	5
Annie Awards	0	1
British Academy Film Awards	0	1
Critics' Choice Movie Awards	0	1
Drama Desk Awards	1	3
Gold Derby Awards	0	1
Golden Globe Awards	3	6
Golden Raspberry Awards	0	1
Grammy Awards	5	12
Hawaii Film Critics Society	0	1
Hollywood Music in Media Awards	1	3
Houston Film Critics Society	0	1
International Film Music Critics Association	0	1
Laurence Olivier Awards	2	4
Online Film & Television Association	3	5
Phoenix Film Critics Society	0	1
Primetime Emmy Awards	1	1
Royal Television Society	0	1
Satellite Awards	1	1
Tony Awards	3	9
Wins	23
Nominations	58

Tim Rice is an English lyricist and author. The following are a list of his wins and nominations for awards in music.

He has been nominated for 5 Academy Awards, winning three for Best Original Song in 1992 for "A Whole New World" from Aladdin with Alan Menken, again in 1994 for "Can You Feel the Love Tonight" from The Lion King with Elton John, and again in 1996 for "You Must Love Me" from the film version of Evita with long-time collaborator Andrew Lloyd Webber. He has received five Grammy Awards, three Tony Awards, and a Primetime Emmy Award. Those accolades have given him the EGOT in the US. Rice has also received three Golden Globe Awards, two Laurence Olivier Awards, and a Drama Desk Award. Rice was inducted into the Songwriters Hall of Fame in 1999. In 2002, he was inducted as a Disney Legend. In 2008, he received a star on the Hollywood Walk of Fame.

== Major awards ==
=== Academy Awards ===
Year	Category	Nominated work	Result	Ref.
1992	Best Original Song	"A Whole New World" (from Aladdin)	Won	
1994	Best Original Song	"Can You Feel the Love Tonight" (from The Lion King)	Won	
1994	Best Original Song	"Circle of Life" (from The Lion King)	Nominated	
1994	Best Original Song	"Hakuna Matata" (from The Lion King)	Nominated	
1996	Best Original Song	"You Must Love Me" (from Evita)	Won	

=== British Academy Film Awards ===
Year	Category	Nominated work	Result	Ref.
1996	Best Original Music	Evita	Nominated	

=== Critics' Choice Movie Awards ===
Year	Category	Nominated work	Result	Ref.
2017	Best Song	"Evermore" (from Beauty and the Beast)	Nominated	

=== Golden Globe Awards ===
Year	Category	Nominated work	Result	Ref.
1992	Best Original Song	"A Whole New World" (from Aladdin)	Won	
1992	Best Original Song	"Friend Like Me" (from Aladdin)	Nominated	
1992	Best Original Song	"Prince Ali" (from Aladdin)	Nominated	
1994	Best Original Song	"Can You Feel the Love Tonight" (from The Lion King)	Won	
1994	Best Original Song	"Circle of Life" (from The Lion King)	Nominated	
1996	Best Original Song	"You Must Love Me" (from Evita)	Won	

=== Grammy Awards ===
Year	Category	Nominated work	Result	Ref.
1972	Album of the Year	Jesus Christ Superstar	Nominated	
1973	Album of the Year	Jesus Christ Superstar	Nominated	
1981	Best Cast Show Album	Evita	Won	
1983	Best Cast Show Album	Joseph and the Amazing Technicolor Dreamcoat	Nominated	
1994	Song of the Year	"A Whole New World" (from Aladdin)	Won	
1994	Best Song Written Specifically for a Motion Picture or for Television	"A Whole New World" (from Aladdin)	Won	
1994	Best Musical Album for Children	Aladdin: Original Motion Picture Soundtrack	Won	
1995	Song of the Year	"Can You Feel the Love Tonight" (from The Lion King)	Nominated	
1995	Song of the Year	"Circle of Life" (from The Lion King)	Nominated	
1995	Best Song Written Specifically for a Motion Picture or for Television	"Can You Feel the Love Tonight" (from The Lion King)	Nominated	
1995	Best Song Written Specifically for a Motion Picture or for Television	"Circle of Life" (from The Lion King)	Nominated	
2001	Best Musical Show Album	Aida	Won	

=== Laurence Olivier Awards ===
Year	Category	Nominated work	Result	Ref.
1978	Musical of the Year	Evita	Won	
1986	Musical of the Year	Chess	Nominated	
1998	Best New Musical	Beauty and the Beast	Won	
2000	Best New Musical	The Lion King	Nominated	
2012	Society of London Theatre Special Award	—N/a	Honored	

=== Primetime Emmy Awards ===
Year	Category	Nominated work	Result	Ref.
2018	Outstanding Variety Special (Live)	Jesus Christ Superstar Live in Concert (as Executive Producer)	Won	

=== Tony Awards ===
Year	Category	Nominated work	Result	Ref.
1972	Best Original Score	Jesus Christ Superstar	Nominated	
1980	Best Original Score	Evita	Won	
1980	Best Book of a Musical	Evita	Won	
1982	Best Original Score	Joseph and the Amazing Technicolor Dreamcoat	Nominated	
1982	Best Book of a Musical	Joseph and the Amazing Technicolor Dreamcoat	Nominated	
1994	Best Original Score	Beauty and the Beast	Nominated	
1998	Best Original Score	The Lion King	Nominated	
2000	Best Original Score	Aida	Won	
2014	Best Original Score	Aladdin	Nominated	

== Miscellaneous awards ==
=== Annie Awards ===
Year	Category	Nominated work	Result	Ref.
2000	Outstanding Individual Achievement for Music in an Animated Feature Production	The Road to El Dorado	Nominated	

=== Drama Desk Awards ===
Year	Category	Nominated work	Result	Ref.
1980	Outstanding Lyrics	Evita	Won	
1994	Outstanding Lyrics	Beauty and the Beast	Nominated	
2014	Outstanding Lyrics	Aladdin	Nominated	

=== Gold Derby Awards ===
Year	Category	Nominated work	Result	Ref.
2018	Best Song	"Evermore" (from Beauty and the Beast)	Nominated	

=== Golden Raspberry Awards ===
Year	Category	Nominated work	Result	Ref.
1981	Worst Original Song	"Hearts, Not Diamonds" (from The Fan)	Nominated	

=== Hawaii Film Critics Society Awards ===
Year	Category	Nominated work	Result	Ref.
2017	Best Song	"Evermore" (from Beauty and the Beast)	Nominated	

=== Hollywood Music in Media Awards ===
Year	Category	Nominated work	Result	Ref.
2017	Best Original Song in an Animated Film	"How Does a Moment Last Forever" (from Beauty and the Beast)	Nominated	
2017	Best Original Song in a Sci-Fi, Fantasy or Horror Film	"How Does a Moment Last Forever" (from Beauty and the Beast)	Won	
2017	Best Original Song in a Sci-Fi, Fantasy or Horror Film	"Evermore" (from Beauty and the Beast)	Nominated	

=== Houston Film Critics Society Awards ===
Year	Category	Nominated work	Result	Ref.
2017	Best Original Song	"Evermore" (from Beauty and the Beast)	Nominated	

=== International Film Music Critics Association Awards ===
Year	Category	Nominated work	Result	Ref.
2014	Best New Archival Release of an Existing Score – Re-Release or Re-Recording	The Lion King	Nominated	

=== Online Film & Television Association Awards ===
Year	Category	Nominated work	Result	Ref.
1996	Best Score	Evita	Won	
1996	Best Original Song	"You Must Love Me" (from Evita)	Won	
1996	Best Adapted Song	"Don't Cry for Me Argentina" (from Evita)	Won	
2017	Best Original Song	"Evermore" (from Beauty and the Beast)	Nominated	
2019	Best Adapted Song	"A Whole New World" (from Aladdin)	Nominated	

=== Phoenix Film Critics Society Awards ===
Year	Category	Nominated work	Result	Ref.
2017	Best Original Song	"Evermore" (from Beauty and the Beast)	Nominated	

=== Royal Television Society ===
Year	Category	Nominated work	Result	Ref.
2016	Best Music – Original Title	From Darkness	Nominated	

=== Satellite Awards ===
Year	Category	Nominated work	Result	Ref.
1996	Best Original Song	"You Must Love Me" (from Evita)	Won	

== Special honors ==
=== American Theater Hall of Fame ===
Year	Honor	Result	Ref.
2016	American Theater Hall of Fame	Inducted	

=== Disney Legends Awards ===
Year	Honor	Result	Ref.
2002	Disney Legends Awards	Inducted	

=== Hollywood Walk of Fame ===
Year	Honor	Result	Ref.
2008	Hollywood Walk of Fame	Inducted	

=== Songwriters Hall of Fame ===
Year	Honor	Result	Ref.
1999	Songwriters Hall of Fame	Inducted	
