= Beauty and the Beast (disambiguation) =

Beauty and the Beast is a 1740 literary fairy tale by Gabrielle-Suzanne Barbot de Villeneuve.

Beauty and the Beast commonly refers to:

- Beauty and the Beast (1756), an abridged fairy tale by Jeanne-Marie Leprince de Beaumont

Beauty and the Beast may also refer to:

== Film and stage ==
=== Disney franchise ===
- Beauty and the Beast (franchise), a Disney media franchise
- Beauty and the Beast (1991 film), an animated film
  - Beauty and the Beast (1991 soundtrack)
  - "Beauty and the Beast" (Disney song), a song from the film
- Beauty and the Beast (musical), a 1994 Broadway musical based on the film
  - Beauty and the Beast (Original Broadway Cast Recording), 1994
- Beauty and the Beast Live on Stage, a theme park show at Walt Disney World based on the film
- Beauty and the Beast (video game), several games based on the film
- Beauty and the Beast (2017 film), a live-action remake of the 1991 film
  - Beauty and the Beast (2017 soundtrack)

=== Other films ===
- Beauty and the Beast (1934 film), a Merrie Melodies animated short film
- Beauty and the Beast (1946 film), a French film directed by Jean Cocteau
- Beauty and the Beast (1962 film), an American film directed by Edward L. Cahn, featuring Meg Wyllie
- Beauty and the Beast (1978 film), a Czechoslovak film directed by Juraj Herz
- Beauty and the Beast (1983 film), a Danish film directed by Nils Malmros
- Beauty and the Beast (1987 film), an American musical film starring Rebecca De Mornay and John Savage
- Beauty and the Beast, an animated feature film of 1992 produced by Bevanfield Films
- Beauty and the Beast, an animated feature film of 1992 produced by Golden Films
- Beauty and the Beast (1996 film), an Australian animated television film produced by Burbank Animation Studios
- Beauty and the Beast (1997 film), another animated film produced by Golden Films
- Beauty and the Beast (2005 film), starring Jane March and William Gregory Lee
- Beauty and the Beast (2009 film), directed by David Lister and starring Estella Warren
- Die Schöne und das Biest (2012 film), a film starring Cornelia Gröschel
- Beauty and the Beast (2014 film), a Franco-German film directed by Christophe Gans

== Literature ==
- Beauty and the Beast (1756), an abridged fairy tale by Jeanne-Marie Leprince de Beaumont
- Beauty and the Beast, a long poem by Carol Ann Duffy and Adrian Henri
- Beauty and the Beast, an 1841 two-act play by J. R. Planché
- Beauty and the Beast: And Tales of Home, an 1872 short story collection by Bayard Taylor
- Beauty and the Beast, an 1886 novel by the English writer Henrietta Keddie, under the pseudonym Sarah Tytler
- Beauty and the Beast, an 1890 pantomime by Augustus Harris and William Yardley
- Beauty and the Beast: An Essay in Evolutionary Aesthetic, a 1920 essay by Stewart Andrew McDowall
- Beauty and the Beast, a 1928 novel by the US writer Kathleen Norris
- "Beauty and the Beast", a 1940 short story by Henry Kuttner
- Beauty and the Beast, a 1951 play by Nicholas Stuart Gray
- Beauty and the Beast, a 1978 book by Marianna Mayer
- Beauty and the Beast (Portuguese: A bela e a fera), a 1979 short story collection by Clarice Lispector
- Beauty and the Beast, a 1982 novel by the US writer Ed McBain
- Beauty and the Beast, a 1984–1985 Marvel Comics limited series written by Ann Nocenti; featuring Beast and Dazzler
- Beauty and the Beast, a 1989 novelization of the pilot episode of the TV series by Barbara Hambly
- Beauty and the Beast, a 1992 novel by Hannah Howell
- Beauty and the Beast, a 1992 novelization of the 1991 film by A. L. Singer
- Beauty and the Beast, a 1992 book by Nancy Willard
- Beauty and the Beast, a 2004 novelization of the 1991 film by Narinder Dhami
- "Beauty and the Beast", an adaptation featured in issues #13–14 (February–April 2007) of Grimm Fairy Tales, a comic series by Zenescope Entertainment
- Beauty and the Beast: The Story of Nastassja and Klaus Kinski, a 2011 non-fiction book by W. A. Harbinson
- Beauty and the Beast: The Only One Who Didn't Run Away, a 2012 novel by Wendy Mass

== Music ==
=== Albums ===
- Beauty and the Beast (1991 soundtrack), from the animated film
- Beauty and the Beast (Original Broadway Cast Recording), 1994
- Beauty and the Beast (2017 soundtrack), from the live-action film
- Beauty and the Beast (Mark Murphy album), 1986
- Beauty and the Beast (EP), by Rapsody, 2014
- Beauty and the Beast, by Fair Game, a band fronted by Ron Keel, 1991
- The Beauty and the Beast, by Stormwitch, 1988

=== Songs ===
- "Beauty and the Beast" (David Bowie song), 1978
- "Beauty and the Beast" (Disney song), from the 1991 film
- "Beauty and the Beast" (Kanye West song), 2025
- "Beauty and the Beast" (Stevie Nicks song), 1983
- "Beauty and the Beast", by Band-Maid from New Beginning, 2015
- "Beauty and the Beast", by Nightwish from Angels Fall First, 1997
- "Beauty and the Beast", by the Rose, 2021
- "Beauty and the Beast", by Wayne Shorter, with Milton Nascimento, from Native Dancer, 1975
- "The Beauty and the Beast", by Digital Emotion
- "The Beauty and the Beast", by Sven Väth, 2008

=== Other music ===
- Beauty and the beast (Gothic metal), a singing trope in the Gothic metal genre
- Beauty and the Beast, a duo consisting of K-1 wrestler Choi Hong-man and Korean supermodel Kang Soo Hee
- "Les entretiens de la belle et de la bête" ("Conversation of Beauty and the Beast"), a movement from Ma mère l'Oye by Maurice Ravel

== Television ==
=== Films, specials and series ===
- Beauty and the Beast (talk show), an Australian panel show first aired in 1964
- Beauty and the Beast (1976 film), an American Hallmark Hall of Fame TV film, starring George C. Scott and Trish Van Devere
- Beauty and the Beast, a 1983 American animated special produced by Ruby-Spears
- Beauty and the Beast (1987 TV series), a 1987–1990 American drama series
- Beauty and the Beast (2009 film) or Beauty and the Beasts: A Dark Tale, a TV movie starring Estella Warren
- Beauty & the Beast (2012 TV series), a 2012–2016 American series loosely based on the 1987 series
- Beauty and the Beast Live!, a 2022 musical special based on the 1991 film

=== Episodes ===
- "Beauty and the Beast" (Dexter), 2010
- "Beauty and the Beast" (Faerie Tale Theatre), 1984
- "Beauty and the Beast" (Super Why!), 2008
- "Beauty & the Beast" (X-Men), 1994
- "Beauty and the Beast: Part One", Merlin, 2009
  - "Beauty and the Beast: Part Two"
- "Beauty and the Beast (Or, Come into My Parlour)", an episode of The League of Gentlemen, 2002
- "Beauty and the Beasts", an episode of Buffy the Vampire Slayer, 1998

== Video gaming ==
- Beauty & the Beast (1982 video game), for the Intellivision
- Beauty and the Beast (1994 video game), an action platformer for the NES
- Beauty and the Beast (1995 video game), a bootleg Commodore 64 game made in Iran
- The Beauty and the Beast Corps, a fictional unit in the video game Metal Gear Solid 4: Guns of the Patriots

== Other uses ==
- Beauty and the Beast (ATU 425C), a subgroup of the Aarne–Thompson–Uther Index group Animal as Bridegroom
- Beauty and the Beast (ATU 425C), a subgroup of the Aarne–Thompson–Uther Index group Animal as Bridegroom
- Beauty and the Beast (strongman competition)
- Beauty and the Beast (ballet), a ballet version of the fairy tale by David Nixon

== See also ==
- Beastly, a 2007 novel by Alex Flinn
  - Beastly (film), 2011, adaptation of the novel
- La Belle et la Bête (disambiguation)
- Beauty and the Beat (disambiguation)
- The Sleeping Beauty and the Beast, a 1901 pantomime by J. Hickory Wood and Arthur Collins
