= Days in the Sun =

2017 song by Alan Menken

Song by Adam Mitchell, Stanley Tucci, Ewan McGregor, Gugu Mbatha-Raw, Ian McKellen, Emma Thompson, Emma Watson, Audra McDonald, Clive Rowe

from the album Beauty and the Beast: Original Motion Picture Soundtrack
- Released: March 10, 2017
- Recorded: 2016
- Genre: Show tune
- Length: 2:40
- Label: Walt Disney
- Composer: Alan Menken
- Lyricist: Tim Rice
- Producers: Alan Menken; Matt Sullivan; Michael Kosarin

"Days in the Sun" is a song written by composer Alan Menken and lyricist Tim Rice for the musical fantasy film Beauty and the Beast (2017), a live-action adaptation of Disney's 1991 animated film of the same name. Rice and Menken developed the concept in 2007 during the first discussions about a remake. Performed by Adam Mitchell, Stanley Tucci, Ewan McGregor, Gugu Mbatha-Raw, Ian McKellen, Emma Thompson, Emma Watson, Audra McDonald, and Clive Rowe, "Days in the Sun" is one of four songs added to the 2017 film. It was released on March 10, 2017, as part of the film's soundtrack.

"Days in the Sun" is prominently featured in a flashback sequence about the death of the Beast's mother. In the lyrics, the Beast's servants and Belle reminisce about earlier parts of their lives. Serving as a replacement of the song "Human Again" from the stage adaptation of the original Disney film, it was regarded as a more sombre expression of the subject matter by music critics. An alternative version of "Days in the Sun", in which the Beast's mother sings a verse, was made available on the Blu-ray release; it was changed after a test audience confused Harriet Jones with Hattie Morahan, who played the mother and Agathe, respectively. Critical response to "Days in the Sun" was mixed; some critics praised its content while others questioned whether it was a necessary addition.

== Background and release ==
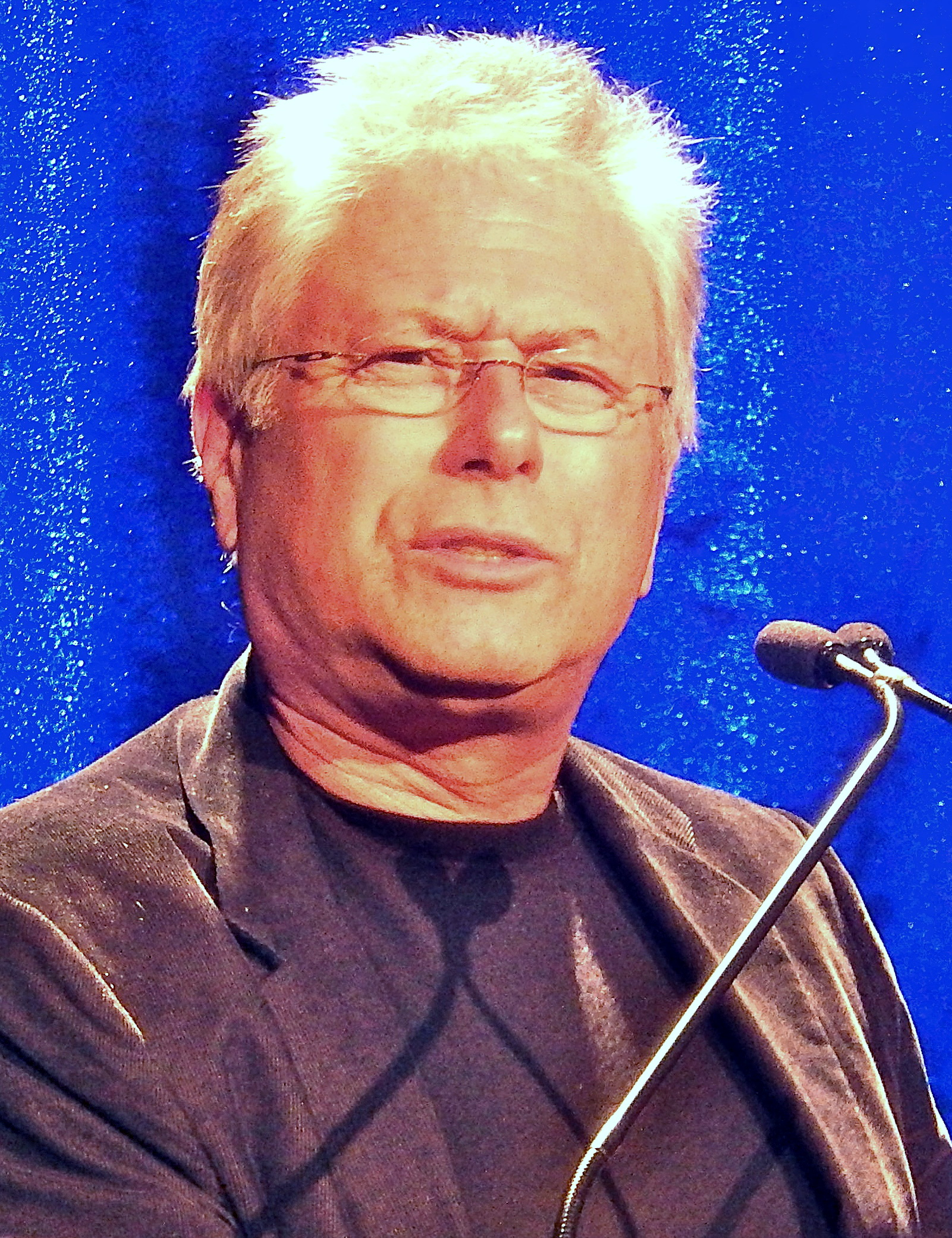
Alan Menken (pictured in 2013) developed "Days in the Sun" with Tim Rice when discussing the possibility of a Beauty and the Beast live-action adaptation.

In 2007, composer Alan Menken and lyricist Tim Rice developed the concept for "Days in the Sun" during early discussions about a possible live-action adaptation of Disney's 1991 animated film Beauty and the Beast. They wrote it during a meeting in London where Menken attended the West End opening for his musical Sister Act. Menken described the song as a lullaby that explores Belle, Beast, and his servants' memories of earlier parts of their lives; Rice approved of the idea as a way of expanding the characters' backgrounds and emphasizing their emotional connection with the audience. When describing his creative process, Menken said he prefers to conduct collaborations in-person; he said: "I prefer to write face to face in the room, I want the feedback, where's the title, the exposition, the architecture of the song." Menken produced the song while collaborating with Rice on the songwriting.

"Days in the Sun" is one of four songs introduced in the 2017 live-action adaptation Beauty and the Beast; the others are "Evermore", "Aria", and "How Does a Moment Last Forever". Menken said he only wanted to create more material for the remake if "it fe[lt] organic to the medium". David Hoberman, who produced the 2017 film, thought "Days in the Sun" would earn Menken his ninth Academy Award for Best Original Song.

A preview of "Days in the Sun" was released on February 17, 2017, along with a portion of Emma Thompson's performance of the 1991 song "Beauty and the Beast". "Days in the Sun" was considered for release as a single but director Bill Condon did not feel it "len[t] itself to the process". A version of "Evermore" performed by Josh Groban was ultimately chosen as a single. Before the film's debut and the soundtrack's release, a series of nail polishes was released; a yellow nail polish was named after the song. "Days in the Sun" was released on March 10, 2017, as a track on the Beauty and the Beast soundtrack; it was made available as an audio CD and a digital download. It is performed by Adam Mitchell as the young Beast, Emma Watson as Belle, and Stanley Tucci, Ewan McGregor, Gugu Mbatha-Raw, Ian McKellen, Emma Thompson, Audra McDonald, and Clive Rowe as the Beast's enchanted servants.

== Context and composition ==
"Days in the Sun" is played three times during the film. It is first heard performed by Audra McDonald as part of a debutante ball. Director Bill Condon identified it as a lullaby the Beast's mother sang for him and said the court had chosen its most celebrated diva to appeal to the Beast.

The song, which Menken called "a combination of a lullaby and a remembrance of happier days for everybody", is performed again by Belle and the servants as they go to bed. Its opening lyrics explores the Beast's childhood. In the scene, the young Prince—before he becomes the Beast—sings "Days in the Sun" for his dying mother. The lyrics include the lines: "Days in the sun / When my life has barely begun / Not until my whole life is done / Will I ever leave you". The song progresses to his servants discussing what they miss about their lives as humans, and their guilt for not preventing the Beast from being spoiled and eventually cursed. Watson's solo contains a reference to the song "A Change in Me", which was written for the stage adaptation of the original Disney film, and its related themes. "Days in the Sun" was also performed as part of a Disney Dream stage production.

"Days in the Sun" replaces the musical theatre version's song "Human Again", and various critics noted that the new addition was more melancholy in comparison. Santa Cruz Sentinel's Bob Strauss called it "a melancholy remembrance of freer and/or more human past". "Days in the Sun" is performed in common-time at a slow tempo of 110 beats per minute, and composed in the key of B-flat major. Seven people perform the song, while its instrumental is provided by a guitar and a piano. One singer's vocal range spans from the low note of F_{3} to the high note of G_{5}.

=== Alternative version and sequence ===
External videos
- Beauty and the Beast Deleted Scene – "Days in the Sun" (2017); The original sequence for "Days in the Sun".

The Blu-ray release of the film includes another version of the song, in which the Beast's mother sings to him. In this version, a sequence showing the Beast's mother singing to her sick child would have been intercut with one of the young Beast singing to his dying mother. The scene and song were changed for the final version because a test audience confused the mother with Agathe. In the original take, the mother was portrayed by Harriet Jones and Agathe by Hattie Morahan. Condon said the changes were a result of his "mistake". He said: "The actresses actually look very much alike, so, sadly when we did it again, even though it is once again Harriet, we had to put her in bed and with dark hair." Jones was retained in the film but Condon had the character portrayed as a brunette to avoid confusion. The actor portraying the young Beast was changed because Condon required the part to be sung.

== Critical reception ==
Critics responded positively to "Days in the Sun" for its contributions to the character development for Belle and the Beast. Estelle Tang of Elle praised the song as a "tearjerker", and Refinery29's Arianna Davis called it "cute and bubbly". Keisha Hatchett of The Mary Sue commended "Days in the Sun" for revealing the similarities of Belle's and the Beast's family backgrounds. Hatchett wrote that their shared understanding of "know[ing] what it's like to lose a mother at a young age and feel[ing] like a freak among their peers" made the characters' romance more understandable for the audience. James Croot of Stuff.co.nz praised the track for "enhanc[ing] the story and allow[ing] the Beast a bit more voice in proceedings".

Several critics responded negatively to "Days in the Sun". Crystal Bell cited it as her least favorite of the new additions to the 2017 adaptation. Bell described it as Watson's best vocal performance in the film, but wrote that the idea of the actress harmonizing with McDonald as laughable. She also praised Mbatha-Raw's vocals and felt the singer deserved her own solo. Sarah Caldwell of Vulture.com said that "Days in the Sun" and "Aria" were created primarily as excuses to provide more material for McDonald. IGN's Eric Goldman criticized "Days in the Sun" and "Evermore" as "uninspired and hard to recall after the fact".
