= If I Can't Love Her =

Song by Terrence Mann

from the album Beauty and the Beast: Original Broadway Cast Recording
- Released: April 26, 1994
- Recorded: 1993–1994
- Length: 4:06
- Label: Walt Disney
- Composer: Alan Menken
- Lyricist: Tim Rice
- Producers: Menken; Bruce Botnick

"If I Can't Love Her" is a song written by composer Alan Menken and lyricist Tim Rice for the musical Beauty and the Beast (1994), a stage adaptation of Disney's 1991 animated film of the same name. Sung by the Beast after he frightens Belle away from the castle, "If I Can't Love Her" details the character's struggles to love her. The song was first performed by American actor Terrence Mann, who both originated the role of the Beast on Broadway and recorded it for the show's original cast album.

Since the Beast barely sings in the original film, Menken and Rice wrote "If I Can't Love Her" to give the Beast a proper solo number, as well as offer him character development and an opportunity to express his feelings about both Belle and his situation. The song borrows musical motifs from some of the score Menken had written for the animated film. A melancholy power ballad more operatic in style than the show's other songs, "If I Can't Love Her" is a lament about love both desired and lost. The song is later reprised after the Beast frees Belle and allows her to return home. Upon premiering in Beauty and the Beast, "If I Can't Love Her" received mostly positive reviews from theatre critics, who praised Menken and Rice's songwriting, and Mann's vocal performance.

"If I Can't Love Her" has since been covered by several artists, including singer Josh Groban. "If I Can't Love Her" was nearly included in the 2017 live-action remake of the film but was ultimately omitted because the songwriters deemed the ballad unsuitable for the film's pacing, instead replacing it with an original song for the Beast entitled "Evermore".

== Background ==
In the animated film Beauty and the Beast (1991), the Beast does not have his own song, and hardly sings apart from a brief solo during "Something There". Composer Alan Menken and lyricist Howard Ashman had not been able to determine a suitable moment for the character to sing in the film, but Menken considered it imperative that the Beast sing in the 1994 stage musical adaptation because he believes he is the story's true protagonist, whose life undergoes the most significant arc. Since Ashman had died in 1991 prior to the film's release, lyricist Tim Rice was recruited to collaborate with Menken on writing new songs for the stage musical, out of which "If I Can't Love Her" was developed. Menken identified creating "If I Can't Love Her" as "one of the benefits" of his new partnership with Rice. "If I Can't Love Her" was one of six original songs Menken wrote with Rice for the production.

"If I Can't Love Her" was written to close the show's first act. Since the musical was written in two-act structure, "If I Can't Love Her" was conceived to allow the Beast an important opportunity to either "howl for redemption" or declare he has given up. "If I Can't Love Her" focuses on character development, as do most original songs written specifically for the show. Deciding that the production did not require any more show-stopping musical numbers like "Be Our Guest" and "Gaston", Rice opted to write new material that "expand[s] the characters and their relationships" instead, describing "If I Can't Love Her" as a song that uncovers the Beast's "human longings". When composing the new songs, Menken attempted to base them on themes he had used to underscore the animated film, to offer audiences a sense of familiarity. For "If I Can't Love Her", he incorporated motifs from the "Prologue", “Belle Enters the Beast’s World” and “Beast Lets Go”, from the original motion picture soundtrack. Librettist Linda Woolverton, who wrote the film's screenplay, also used "If I Can't Love Her" to develop the Beast into a more rounded, fully realized character while adapting her own screenplay, further exploring previously unheard thoughts from the character.

Menken co-produced the track with Bruce Botnick. Actor Terrence Mann, who originated the role of the Beast on Broadway, recorded "If I Can't Love Her" for the musical's original cast album, which was released on April 26, 1994.

== Use in Beauty and the Beast ==
"If I Can't Love Her" is, at times, referred to by critics as the Beast's only solo song in the stage musical, although the character also performs the brief "How Long Must this Go On?". Prior to "If I Can't Love Her", the show primarily consists of upbeat musical numbers performed by supporting characters such as Gaston, Lefou, and Lumiere. In the musical, the Beast sings "If I Can't Love Her" at the end of Beauty and the Beast's first act after he angrily frightens Belle away from the castle, before she encounters a pack of wolves while fleeing through the forest, serving as the finale to Act I. Immediately following the lively "Be Our Guest", the ballad precedes the show's intermission, ending Act I "on a smoky and introspective note", according to Brad Hevenor of The Independent. Belle leaves the Beast to ponder what little is left of his humanity, revealing his tender, compassionate side. While lamenting the status of his relationship with Belle, the Beast realizes that he has squandered an opportunity to love someone and "turn everything around," still struggling to love a person as "beautiful and fascinating" as Belle. Belle's departure forces the Beast to examine that failing to love her will result in him remaining a beast forever, realizing that he has not only lost Belle but also "any chance of being himself again."

Striving to imbue the character with more depth and dimension, Menken described the scene as a moment in which the Beast ponders "If I can’t love her then who can I ever love?". The Disney Song Encyclopedia author Thomas S. Hischak described the song as a "soul-searching" ballad in which the hero "fights off despair and considers his ability to fall in love with Belle". According to Tamara Ikenberg of the Anchorage Daily News, the number "reveals the depths of the Beast's depression as he accepts that he may never be human again and wishes for a way ... out of his pain." Natalie Salvo of The AU Review identified the musical number as the moment "the character poured his heart out". According to LAexcites.com contributor Imaan Jalali, the number demonstrates the character's "distinct melancholy that reverberates with the hearts of attendees" while "he bares his downtrodden soul". The Beast later reprises the song after he allows Belle to return home and tend to her ailing father, wondering if he will ever see her again. Conversely, the reprise "expresses his own sorrow of remaining in the curse, but more importantly of not winning Belle’s love".

Menken summarized the musical number as simply "a moment of just crying out to the heavens." The Ottawa Citizen critic Zaina Khan wrote that the ballad indicates "a shift from ferocity to humility displaying the Beast’s dichotomy between ill-tempered rage and instant regret." Similarly, The Plain Dealer contributor Laura DeMarco believes that the song "further humanize[s]" the Beast. Bruce Miller of the Sioux City Journal described the musical number's staging as a combination of the stage musicals Les Miserables (1980) and Evita (1978), which is sometimes performed onstage amidst artificial fog.

== Composition ==
"If I Can't Love Her" is a melancholy power ballad. Written in the key of C major and performed at a free tempo of 112 beats per minute, the song lasts four minutes and six seconds (4:06) in duration. AllMusic's Peter Fawthrop described the track as "dark" and "mournful". Lindsey BahrIt, writing for the Toronto Star, described its melody as "soaring". The Plain Dealer's Laura DeMarco described the ballad as "sentimental", while D23 called it "heart-wrenching". Some critics have deemed "If I Can't Love Her" an anthem; Holly Beretto of Houstonia identified the song as "an anthem to love desired and lost" that "showcases [the actor's] vocal and acting range." Similarly, Bruce Miller of the Sioux City Journal dubbed it a "lament about lost love". Cassie Tongue of The Guardian called it "a deeply serious cri de cœur that closes the first act".

An emotional number, the song begins with "soft phrases" expressing "gentleness and heartfelt emotion, before build[ing]" as it grows and progresses. Despite being performed in a major key, the ballad compensates by using "vocals, slowness, and mirroring the haunting theme" of the score. Variety's Jerome Weeks wrote that the song "combines a lovely descending-line melody with one of Rice’s most touching efforts in the way the Beast haltingly, almost inarticulately grapples with his developing love." Thomas S. Hischak, author of The Disney Song Encyclopedia, observed that the track boasts "a resounding, operatic tone that is far heavier" than the film's original songs.

Jo Litson of Limelight identified the song as a "tenor power ballad", with Mann's original vocals spanning two octaves, from B_{2} to F_{4}. Performed in the vocal range of a baritenor, the vocalist performs "a high and sustained note" while singing the ballad's final line “If I can’t love her, let the world be done with me”, a lyric Paul Lockwood of the Northwest Herald described as "heart-wrenching". Lyrically, the protagonist wonders who he can love "If [he] can't love her". Beginning "And in my twisted face there's not the slightest trace of anything that even hints of kindness", the song's lyrics convey "hope and hopelessness, the pain and beauty of love, and the anguish of loss." Entertainment Weekly's Clark Collis wrote that the song is about "How am I going to fall in love with her?".

== Critical reception ==
This song has received acclaim from critics, who praised Menken and Rice's songwriting, as well as the performances of Mann and subsequent actors. Variety's Jeremy Gerard reviewed "If I Can't Love Her" as Rice's strongest lyrical contribution to the show. Also writing for Variety, Jerome Weeks said Menken and Rice's efforts particularly "shine" during "If I Can't Love Her", while Tom Jacobs said the song "makes the strongest impact" among their new material. Reviewing Justin Glaser's rendition at the Blaisdell Concert Hall, John Berger of the Honolulu Star-Advertiser said the actor's performance "brings Act I to a stirring and passionate close". The Times-Picayune critic Theodore P. Mahne wrote that Jason Kyle Dowies "solid vocals burst forth with power and passion". The Greenville News critic Paul Hyde called Chase Wolfe's version at the South Carolina Children's Theatre "impassioned", while Bob Curtright of The Wichita Eagle wrote that Thaddeus Pearson's rendition "is particularly powerful and heartbreaking".

Other critics have commended how the song enhances the Beast's character. Melissa Taylor of the Houston Chronicle believes that the song offers the Beast "a gloomily relatable interiority" that the film otherwise lacked. Reviewing a performance at the Broward Center for the Performing Arts, Boca Raton Magazine said "If I Can't Love Her" provides "deeper emotional understanding to the sorrows of both [the Beast and Belle]", while calling it a beautiful conclusion to the first act. Bruce Miller of the Sioux City Journal opined that the number provides the character with his "best roar". Andra Abramson of DC Metro Theater Arts identified "If I Can't Love Her" as the show's only original song that does not "pale in comparison to the familiar songs from the movie." Simon Duke of the Evening Chronicle described the song as "a more than welcome addition to the stage version's repertoire", writing that it allows its actor "the chance to deliver a masterful, extremely powerful and goosebump inducing performance, leaving the audience to give rapturous applause as the curtain came down for the interval". Reviewing Alyn Hawke's performance at the Edinburgh Playhouse, Liam Rudden of the Edinburgh Evening News called his rendition shiver-inducing. Dianne Bourne of the Manchester Evening News called actor Shaq Taylor's performance "stirring".

Conversely, Sean Daly of the Tampa Bay Times dismissed the song as a "hookless yearner", while the Edmonton Journal deemed it "generic" despite its "quivering intensity", writing "the Phantom might easily have taken [it] on, if he felt like padding out his stage time."

== Covers and impact ==
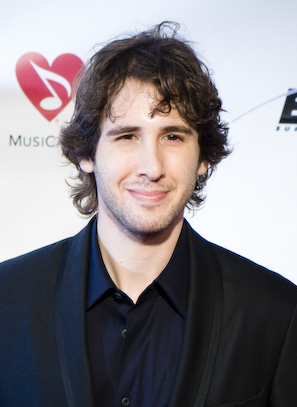
Singer and actor Josh Groban covered "If I Can't Love Her" for his album Stages (2015).

Singer and actor James Graeme covered "If I Can't Love Her" with the National Symphony Orchestra for the compilation album The Very Best Of Broadway Musicals (2002). In 2004, actor Ron Raines included his rendition of the ballad on his album So In Love With Broadway (2004). Singer and actor Josh Groban covered the song and included it on deluxe versions of his studio album Stages (2015), sold exclusively at Target. The track is cited as a "Target exclusive track". Actor Kane Alexander covered "If I Can't Love Her" for his Broadway-themed studio album Kane Alexander: Different Stages (The Broadway Album) (2017).

The song was nearly incorporated into the 2017 live-action remake of the animated film. Menken and director Bill Condon had originally wanted to use "If I Can't Love Her" but ultimately concluded that the film lacked an appropriate moment at which the Beast could sing it, determining that the character could only sing after he had released Belle. Although Menken and Rice had considered re-writing the song's lyrics to suit the scene, they ultimately decided to write an entirely new ballad instead, which became "Evermore". Condon explained that "Onstage, you can have a character express his feelings for three minutes in a beautiful, powerful song" whereas "In a movie, that character has to be somewhere different at the end of the song from where he starts, the story has to keep on." The filmmakers also determined that the original song was not suitable for the film's three-act structure, as the Beast's solo occurs later in the film than it does in the musical. Menken joked that "If I Can't Love Her" was written "specifically for the act break of a Broadway show; in a film, people aren't going out to go to the bathroom and get drinks." Menken maintains that he would have included "If I Can't Love Her" in the film if given the option. Comparing the two ballads, actor Dan Stevens, who portrays Beast in the remake and recorded "Evermore", wrote that the new song is about "I’ve fallen in love with her, and now she’s buggered off, woe is me" whereas "If I Can't Love Her" muses "How am I going to fall in love with her?". Critics consider "Evermore" to be a replacement for "If I Can't Love Her", to which it was compared. Maria Sciullo of the Pittsburgh Post-Gazette wrote that the new song "lacks the sheer power of 'If I Can’t Love Her,'" despite being "more upbeat in spirit". ReelViews' James Berardinelli called "Evermore" "solid, although perhaps not as good as 'If I Can’t Love Her'."

After debuting in the musical, "If I Can't Love Her" proved to be very popular among fans. "If I Can't Love Her" is considered to be one of Mann's signature songs. Since becoming a professor of musical theatre at Western Carolina University, Mann has observed that "If I Can't Love Her" is one of three songs from his stage career regarded as standards for male students due to how much his role in Beauty and the Beast resonated among fans.
