= La Belle et la Bête =

La Belle et la Bête may refer to:

- La Belle et la Bête (fairy tale) or Beauty and the Beast
- La Belle et la Bête (opera), a chamber opera by Philip Glass
- "La Belle et la Bête" (song), a song by Babyshambles from Down in Albion
- La Belle et la Bête (1946 film) or Beauty and the Beast, a French romantic fantasy film by Jean Cocteau
- La Belle et la Bête (2014 film) or Beauty and the Beast, a film by Christophe Gans
- Beauty and the Beast (1987 film) or La Belle et la Bête, an American/Israeli musical film

== See also ==
- Beauty and the Beast (disambiguation)
- "La Bête et la Belle", a 2011 song by Amanda Lear from I Don't Like Disco
