= Voca People =

Israeli a cappella ensemble

The Voca People
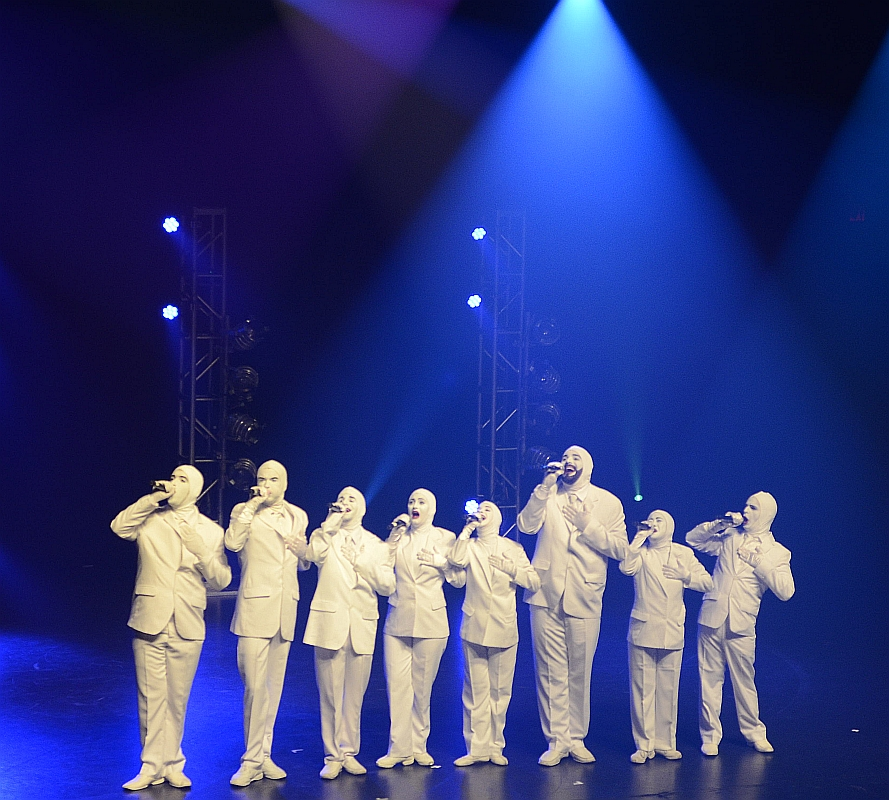

Background information
- Origin: Israel
- Genres: A Cappella
- Years active: 2009–present
- Website: www.voca-people.com

The Voca People is an ensemble performing vocal theater combining a cappella and beat box vocals to reproduce the sounds of an entire orchestra.

They have performed in Spain, United States, Hungary, Italy, France, England, Israel and many other places. They incorporate the public into their songs and change or add bits depending on which country they are in (e.g. If they were in Spain they would perform songs in Spanish and incorporate the Spanish public into their performance.)

== History ==
The creators, Lior Halfon and Shai Fishman, envisioned a group of performers dressed completely in white with red lips. The Voca People claim to come from the Planet Voca (somewhere behind the Sun) where all communication is based on music and vocal expressions. They float around in space in their ship, which is powered by nothing more than music, and arrived on Earth which has a great repertoire of music. Their motto is: "Life is music and music is life."

In Italy they became famous through a clip on YouTube, which had over 15 million hits in less than one year, and a series of television appearances. Their first appearance in an Italian TV show was Ale e Franz on 28 September 2009. Later they also appeared on Domenica In and the Italian X Factor.

The Voca People sometimes mingle with crowds, singing, improvising and playing with passers-by. Their appearance and performances have been compared to Blue Man Group.

In 2010 they brought their show to Italy with stops in Rome, Bari, Milan, Florence, Padua, Naples and Turin. They returned in February 2011 to Aosta.

They performed during the closing ceremony of the 18th Shanghai international film festival in June 2015, Shanghai, China and also during the opening ceremony of the Eurovision song contest that was held in Tel Aviv in 2019.

In 2023 they started touring with a whole new show called "The Voca People Cosmic Tour".

== Troupe members ==
- Beat On: Chen Zimerman / Ran Cimer / Mark Martin / Nadav Eder / Sidi Moussa / Ori Brinker
- Scratcher: Isato Boyko / Ofir Tal / Tiago Grade / Paul Vignes (Polo)
- Tubas: Idan Shemii / Bryant Charles Vance / Alon Sharr / Eyal Edelman / Shimon Smith / Arnaud Leonard / Vandson Paiva / Roie Busany
- Tenor: Cesar Viana-Ross/ Ido Fermon / Almog Kapach / Ashot Gasparian / Omer Shàish / Chris Dilley / Nick Anastasia / Gaëtan Borg / Idan Tendler
- Baritone: Dor Kaminka / Barak Tamam / Uri Elkayam / Jacob Schneider / Oded Goldstein / Tony Bastian / Amit Shekel
- Alto: Inbar Yochananof / Meital Segal / Laura Dadap / Adi Kozlovsky / Maya Pennington / Vered Avidan / Magali Bonfils / Oren Torres
- Mezzo: Nofar Cohen / Maayan Bukris / Sapir Braier / Vered Sasportas / Emily Drennan / Bar Klein / Sharon Laloum / Shoval Shustiel
- Soprano: Nitzan Ofir / Ganit Simovitz / Michelle Green / Alona Alexander / Christine Paterson / Chelsey Keding / Liran Saporta Barel / Cécilia Cara / Noya Added
