= Beauty and the Beast (Original Broadway Cast Recording) =

Beauty and the Beast – A New Musical (Original Broadway Cast Recording)

Cast recording by the original Broadway cast of Beauty and the Beast
- Released: June 20, 1994
- Studio: Sony Music Studios, New York City
- Genre: Show tune; pop; ballad
- Length: 72:09
- Label: Walt Disney
- Producer: Alan Menken; Howard Ashman; Tim Rice

Beauty and the Beast is the cast album performed by the original Broadway cast members from the 1994 Disney stage musical Beauty and the Beast, with music by Alan Menken, lyrics by Howard Ashman and Tim Rice, and a book by Linda Woolverton. It is adapted from Walt Disney Pictures' 1991 animated musical film of the same name, which in turn had been based on the classic French fairy tale by Jeanne-Marie Leprince de Beaumont. The cast album was released on CD and cassette formats, and further re-issued on digital formats in 1999.

== Background ==
Eight of the film's original songs that were retained for the Broadway adaptation. Menken, who had both scored and written the film's songs alongside lyricist Ashman, returned to the project to write six new songs for the musical; those were co-written by Tim Rice, replacing Ashman who had died in 1991, before the film was released. The album featured much of the musical numbers, and alternate versions of the songs. The new musical tracks, include "Human Again", which had originally been written for the film, but ultimately abandoned due to time and story constraints; this number was featured in the 2002 special edition of the film. The track "A Change in Me" was written for specifically for R&B singer Toni Braxton, when she joined the Broadway production to play Belle in 1998. This track was however, not included in the Broadway or of the subsequent cast recordings. However, Susan Egan who played Belle had included it in her 2002 album So Far....

== Reception ==
Peter Fawthrop of AllMusic summarized, "There may not have been reason to own the Broadway Cast Recording, aside from being a fan of Susan Egan's (voice of Belle), if not for these extra songs. Each one could have fit in perfectly with the film — they aren't simply shoveled in as bonuses, but make the whole picture bigger and fuller. Every major character has their own new song, the standout being "Home," which is sung by Belle upon arriving at the Beast's castle. "Me," sung by the handsome and evil Gaston, is a boisterous love song to himself, stuffed with witty lines like "women can have their uses too/mainly to extend the family tree." Even the Beast has his solo moment with the dark, mournful ballad "If I Can't Love Her." The household objects who gave Disney World a new theme of "Be Our Guest," reveal their longings to return to human form in "Human Again," the only new song which was written by Howard Ashman. There is something for all fans here, even those who prefer the clear-cut original versions and voices from the animated film."

== Track listing ==
All music is composed by Alan Menken.

No.	Title	Lyrics	Performer(s)	Length
1.	"Prologue" (The Enchantress)		Wendy Oliver	2:37
2.	"Belle"	Howard Ashman	Broadway Cast of Beauty and the Beast; Burke Moses; Kenny Raskin; Linda Talcott; Paige Price; Sarah Solie Shannon; Susan Egan	5:17
3.	"No Matter What"	Tim Rice	Susan Egan; Tom Bosley	3:06
4.	"No Matter What / Wolf Chase" (Reprise)	Tim Rice	Tom Bosley	1:55
5.	"Me"	Tim Rice	Burke Moses; Susan Egan	2:48
6.	"Belle" (Reprise)	Howard Ashman	Susan Egan	1:08
7.	"Home"	Tim Rice	Susan Egan	3:50
8.	"Home" (Reprise)	Tim Rice	Beth Fowler	0:54
9.	"Gaston"	Howard Ashman	Burke Moses; Kenny Raskin; Linda Talcott; Paige Price; Sarah Solie Shannon	5:02
10.	"Gaston" (Reprise)	Howard Ashman	Burke Moses; Kenny Raskin	1:37
11.	"How Long Must This Go On"	Tim Rice	Terrence Mann	0:56
12.	"Be Our Guest"	Howard Ashman	Barbara Marineau; Beth Fowler; Brian Press; Gary Beach; Heath Lamberts; Stacey Logan	6:55
13.	"If I Can't Love Her"	Tim Rice	Terrence Mann	4:06
14.	"Entr'Acte/ Wolf Chase"		Alan Menken	4:29
15.	"Something There"	Howard Ashman	Beth Fowler; Gary Beach; Heath Lamberts; Susan Egan; Terrence Mann	5:27
16.	"Human Again"	Howard Ashman	Barbara Marineau; Beth Fowler; Brian Press; Gary Beach; Heath Lamberts; Stacey Logan; Cast	4:45
17.	"Maison Des Lunes"	Tim Rice	Burke Moses; Gordon Stanley; Kenny Raskin	2:24
18.	"Beauty And The Beast"	Howard Ashman	Beth Fowler	3:34
19.	"If I Can't Love Her" (Reprise)	Tim Rice	Terrence Mann	1:34
20.	"The Mob Song"	Howard Ashman	Cast; Burke Moses; Gordon Stanley; Kenny Raskin	3:02
21.	"The Battle"	Howard Ashman	Cast	2:34
22.	"End Duet / Transformation"	Tim Rice	Susan Egan; Terrence Mann	3:27
23.	"Beauty And The Beast" (Reprise)	Howard Ashman	Cast	0:42
Total length:				72:09

== Personnel ==
Credits adapted from CD liner notes.

Cast

- Narrator – David Ogden Stiers
- Belle – Susan Egan
- Beast – Terrence Mann
- Gaston – Burke Moses
- LeFou – Kenny Raskin
- Lumière – Gary Beach
- Mrs. Potts – Beth Fowler
- Cogsworth – Heath Lamberts
- Maurice – Tom Bosley
- Babette – Stacey Logan
- Chip – Brian Press
- Monsieur D'Arque – Gordon Stanley

Ensemble cast

- Alisa Klein
- Anna McNeeley
- Barbara Marineau
- Bill Nabel
- Dan Mojica
- David Elder
- Elmore James
- Gordon Stanley
- Gregorey Garrison
- Harrison Beal
- Jack Hayes
- Joan Barber
- Joanne McHugh
- Kate Dowe
- Kim Huber
- Linda Talcott
- Merwin Foard
- Michael Demby-Cain
- Paige Price
- Patrick Loy
- Rob Lorey
- Sarah Solie Shannon
- Vince Pesce
- Wysandria Woolsey

Production

- Music production – Alan Menken, Bruce Botnick
- Recording, editing and mixing – Bruce Botnick
- Programming – Daniel Tramon
- Score arrangement – Michael Kosarin
- Incidental music arrangement and supervision – David Friedman
- Album co-ordinator – Janet Weber

Instruments

- Accordion – Dominic Cortese
- Bass – Jeff Carney
- Bass clarinet – Alva Hunt
- Bassoon and contrabassoon – Marc Goldberg
- Cello – Barry Fincklair, Caryl Paisner, Frederick Zlotkin, Gerald Tarack, Joe Kimura, Maria Kitsopoulos
- Clarinet – Alva Hunt, Kari Ann DiBari
- Drums – John Redsecker
- Flute – Alva Hunt, Kari Ann DiBari, Julius Baker
- French horn – Glen Estrin, Jeff Lang, Tony Cecere
- Harp – Stacey Shames
- Harpsichord – Gerry Ranck, Ken Cooper
- Oboe and English horn – Vicki Bodner
- Percussion – Joe Passaro
- Piccolo flute – Alva Hunt, Julius Baker
- Piccolo trumpet – Tony Kadleck
- Synthesizer – Glen Kelly, Kathy Sommer
- Trumpet and cornet – Neal Balm, Tony Kadleck
- Tuba and bass trombone – Paul Falise
- Violin – Ann Labin, Belinda Whitney, Cenovia Cummins, Evan Johnson, George Wozniak, Rudy Perrault

Orchestra

- Orchestration – Danny Troob
- Additional orchestration – Michael Starobin
- Conductor – Michael Kosarin
- Associate conductor – Kathy Sommer
- Orchestra contractor – John Miller
- Copyist – Peter R. Miller

== Certifications ==
Region	Certification	Certified units/sales
United States (RIAA)	Gold	500,000^{^}
^{^} Shipments figures based on certification alone.

== See also ==
- Beauty and the Beast (Original Australian Cast Recording)
- Beauty and the Beast (Original London Cast Recording)
