= Beauty and the Beat =

Beauty and the Beat may refer to:

- Beauty and the Beat (The Go-Go's album), 1981
- Beauty and the Beat!, a 1959 album by Peggy Lee
- Beauty and the Beat (Edan album), 2005
- Beauty and the Beat (Tarja album), a 2014 musical project by Tarja Turunen and Mike Terrana
- "Beauty and the Beat", an episode of the TV series Jonas
- Beauty & the Beat (EP), 2018 the third extended play from South Korean girl group Loona

== See also ==
- "Beauty and a Beat", a 2012 song by Justin Bieber from the album Believe
- Beauty and the Beast (disambiguation)
