= Human Again (song) =

Song by Jerry Orbach, David Ogden Stiers, Angela Lansbury and Jo Anne Worley

from the album Beauty and the Beast
- Language: English
- Genre: Show tune
- Length: 4:53
- Label: Walt Disney
- Composer: Alan Menken
- Lyricist: Howard Ashman
- Producers: Howard Ashman; Alan Menken

"Human Again" is a song originally written for and later restored to the 1991 musical Beauty and the Beast, animated by Disney. With music by Alan Menken and lyrics by Howard Ashman, "Human Again" was replaced during production of the original 1991 version of the film by "Something There", but was retained and revised by Menken and new lyricist Tim Rice for the 1994 stage musical adaptation of Beauty and the Beast. A newly produced sequence featuring "Human Again" was added to the Beauty and the Beast animated film for its 2002 IMAX Special Edition and subsequent DVD, VHS, and Blu-ray home releases.

The song is an upbeat waltz, with lyrics sung by several of the enchanted objects/house servants in the castle of the Beast, who are hopeful that now that he and Belle are getting closer to one another, they could fall in love and break the spell on their castle, which would restore all of them to human form. The song also expands the role of The Wardrobe, giving her a solo verse in the number. In the film, where it falls between "Something There" and "Beauty and the Beast", "Human Again" is primarily performed by Lumière (Jerry Orbach), Cogsworth (David Ogden Stiers), Mrs. Potts (Angela Lansbury), and The Wardrobe (Jo Anne Worley). Neither Belle nor the Beast sing in the song, but they are seen in a brief scene where Belle teaches the Beast to read starting with Romeo & Juliet (King Arthur in the stage version and demo).

== Production ==
The song was originally written for the 1991 film, but was cut due to pacing issues and its length. It was included in the 1994 Broadway musical, and was brought back for the 2002 DVD release of the film.

Don Hahn explained: "Kirk and Gary and I were sitting around talking about the Star Wars Special Edition that had just come out and Kirk jokingly suggested, 'wouldn't it be fun to do a special edition of Beauty with Human Again or new material in it?' When the head of Feature Animation said he thought it was a great idea, we stopped joking and began thinking about how we could actually do it. We had storyboarded the sequence for the original production, but completely reworked it for this special edition of the film."

Kirk Wise (who directed the original film) also directed the reanimated sequence, with co-director of Beauty and the Beast Gary Trousdale. Wise explained, "we had many of the same animators, same background painters, same artists that worked on the sequence".

== Composition ==
Show Biz Training describes the song as a "beautiful waltz". It is composed in the key of G Major in 3/4 time.

== Removal ==
"Human Again" is considered by the Disney executives as somewhat of a controversial song within Beauty and the Beast. DigitalMediaFX said "there's a reason that the "Human Again" song was not included in the original Beauty and the Beast until 2002—it didn't quite fit", and cites Disney's own statement, "the song posed story problems which were difficult to solve in a timely manner. Because it was originally conceived as an 11-minute musical number, Disney had no other choice but to ultimately replace the song with the shorter and more direct 'Something There'". Show Biz Training explains the song was cut "in spite of the writers' and film makers' strong desire to keep it in the film". They eventually chose service to the story over self-indulgence and reluctantly cut the number.

Kirk Wise explained the motivation behind the song's removal from the film and reinstatement in the stage version thus: "Back when it was originally written and storyboarded it was initially 11 minutes long, which is a pretty heavy milieu for an animated feature that already had a lot of songs. Length was one problem and the structure of the song was also a problem at the time because it indicated the passage of time, months of time, leaves falling. That presented a couple story problems for us because we kept asking, 'Well what? Is Maurice wandering around in the woods all this time? Is Gaston just sitting around in a tavern drinking beer after beer growing a long white beard?' we couldn't quite figure out what to do with the other characters during this time that Belle's at the castle and keep the motor of the story running. Those were the reasons for cutting it at the time. It wasn't until we saw the Broadway version where Alan[Menken] had made a substantial edit in the music and had found a slightly different place for the song to sit, so we realized there was a way to make this work. The bridge which was all about time passing was removed... so that issue went away. And Alan did a couple of additional edits for us when we were tailoring it for the movie, and now it works. There's a great little suite of music now that starts with "Something There," the song that B&B sing while they're having a little snowball fight, which segues into "Human Again" which gives the object perspective on what they hope for when B&B fall in love and that transitions into "Beauty and the Beast" the ballad, which is the culmination of their relationship. So, it's a nice little story within a story now."

== Reception ==
DigitalMediaFX said "The first half of the song (including the intro to it) seem a bit weak, yet it got better as the song continued. Then, three-fourths the way through the song there is a scene where Belle is teaching Beast to read. This single sequence, albeit short, deepened the story and the relationship issue. It is definitely an excellent addition to the movie. I also must admit that it was quite interesting to have something "new" to see. But at the same time, "Human Again" almost makes it feel like there is "one too many" songs in this classic, particularly coming so soon after "Something There." I think the movie would have been perfect if the "learning to read" scene had been added without the song". A review of Beauty and the Beast 3D by Collider noted the exclusion of the number, deeming it a smart move due to not being a "bad song", but being "nowhere near as good as the rest of the number and it slows down the pacing".

While "Human Again" is not featured in the live-action film, a variation of it can be seen in "Days in the Sun", performed after the Beast rescues Belle from the wolves, preceding the number "Something There". The song is sung first by a child representing the then-human Prince during his youth, on his mother's deathbed; then by Lumiére, Plumette, Mrs. Potts, and Madame de Garderobe; then by Belle, before being sung by everyone. The song is all about reliving everyone's "days in the sun" (representing their former lives: the enchanted curse for the Beast (as well as his mother being alive) and the castle staff, and freedom for Belle), and hoping for a "new day".
