= South County Independent =

South County Independent (now The Independent)
- Type: Weekly Newspaper
- Format: Broadsheet
- Owner(s): Rhode Island Suburban Newspapers Operations Inc.
- Publisher: Southern Rhode Island Newspapers
- Editor: Dan Kittredge
- Founded: 1995
- Headquarters: 187 Main St. Wakefield, Rhode Island 02879-3504 United States
- Circulation: 8,482
- Website: http://www.independentri.com

South County Independent was a weekly newspaper serving the areas of Narragansett, South Kingstown, Charlestown, Kingston, Wakefield and Peace Dale in Rhode Island. The paper was founded in 1997 by Frederick J. Wilson III & a group of investors. In October 2015, South County Independent merged with the North East Independent to become one paper, called The Independent, which covers North Kingstown, Narragansett, and South Kingstown. The Independent's weekly circulation is 8,482.

Frederick J. Wilson founded South County Newspapers and the South County Independent after he left the Narragansett Times in 1995. Wilson's split from the Times was not amicable. Wilson said of the Times' owner, the Journal Register Company, "They don't care about the product. They don't care about the customer. They don't care about the employees. And they don't know anything about the business." Wilson wanted to "produce a weekly newspaper that would not be beholden to corporate interests;" upon leaving, he immediately founded a South County Newspapers to compete with the Times and Journal Register Company, and recruited several of the staff to work with him.

South County Newspapers began publishing the South County Life magazine in 1998. South County Life published 7 editions per year. In 1999, South County Newspapers began publishing the North East Independent, which covered the areas of East Greenwich and North Kingstown.

Wilson stepped down from the South County Independent in 2001. Managing editor of the paper, Betty Cotter, who had followed Wilson from the Narragansett Times, said that Wilson's leaving was amicable and that he would remain president of the board of directors. Wilson was named to the Rhode Island Press Association's Hall of Fame in 2010.

After Wilson's departure, South County Newspapers became part of Edward A. Sherman Publishing Co.

In 2015, the South County Independent won the Community Newspaper of the Year award from the Rhode Island Press Association. The paper received 5 additional awards that year. Shortly thereafter, the South County Independent and the North East Independent merged to become one paper, The Independent, under managing editor Liz Boardman. Their combined circulation was 11,400.

In 2017, GateHouse Media Inc. acquired Edward A. Sherman Publishing Co. At the time, The Independent reported a circulation of 9,000.

In 2018, The Independent and the South County Life magazine were sold to Southern Rhode Island Newspapers, which is part of Rhode Island Suburban Newspapers Operations Inc., and which publishes papers that compete with The Independent. Under Rhode Island Newspaper Operations, The Independent is now headquartered and published in Wakefield, Rhode Island.
