= Beauty and the Beast (1995 video game) =

- Developer: Maham Samanpajouh
- Platform: Commodore 64
- Release: 1995

Beauty and the Beast is a bootleg Iranian videogame by Maham Samanpajouh. Based on the homonymous Disney movie, it was published for Commodore 64 in March 1995, being the first Iranian videogame in history, as it predates Ali Baba and the Forthy Thieves of Bagdad by eight months. Some sources claim the game was indeed released in 1996.

It was developed by Maham Samanpajouh, with graphics by Reza Shamsian; who were 16 at the time. With music taken from different places, the game also copies the gameplay and takes various assets from the Last Ninja series, especially the third installment. Never meant for commercial release, according to the developer, it was released around March 1995 in some Iranian computer stores, selling less than 230 copies.
