= Patti Drennan =

American composer and arranger

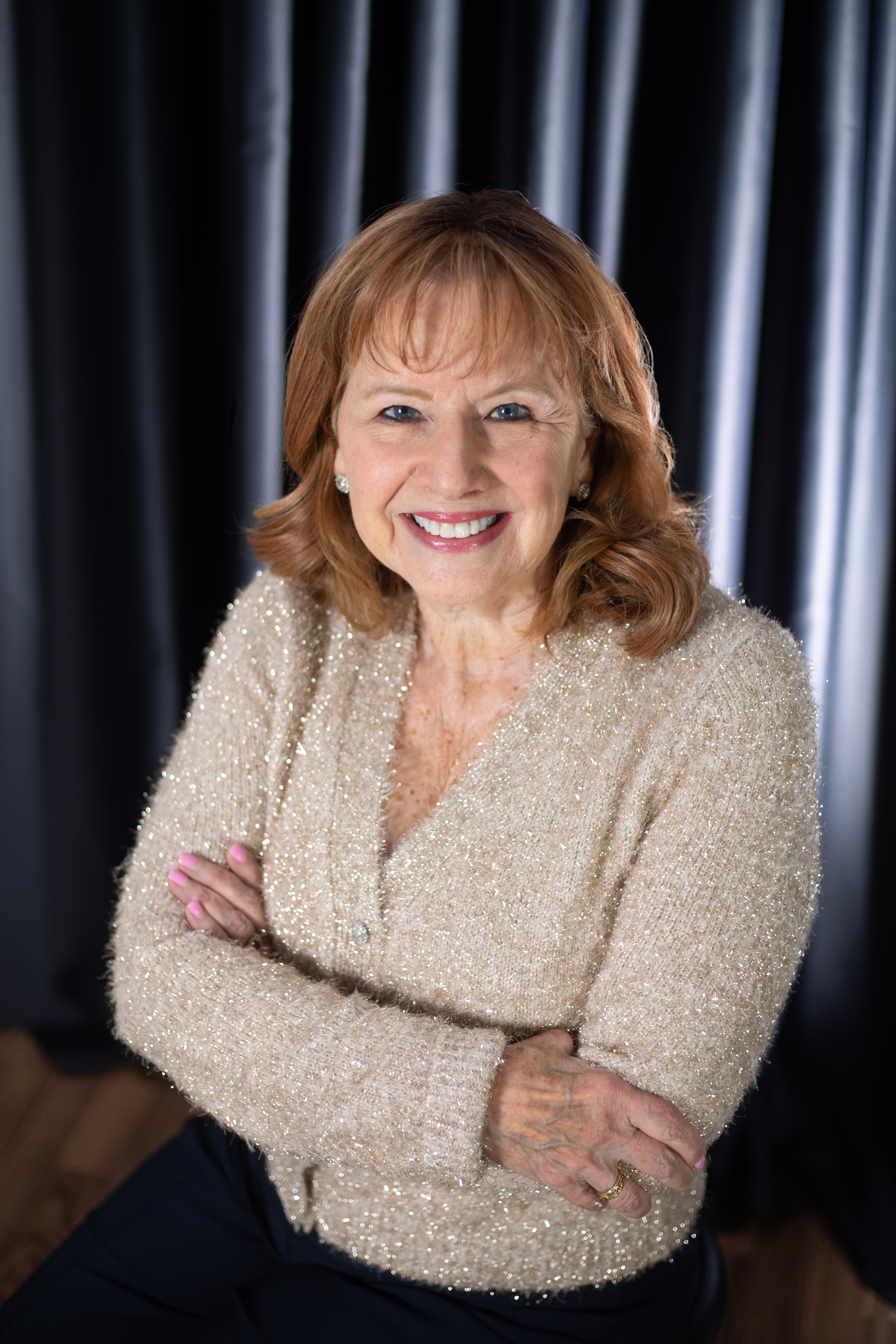

Background information
- Born: U.S.
- Genres: Classical; Musical theatre; Choral
- Occupations: Composer; arranger; conductor

Patti Drennan is an American composer, arranger, conductor, and music educator. She was nominated for a 2026 Grammy Award in the Best Choral Performance category for the album Requiem of Light (2025).

== Life and career ==
Patti earned a Bachelor of Music Education degree from Oklahoma State University and a Master of Music Education degree from the University of Oklahoma.

Patti taught choral music for 28 years at Norman High School and West Mid-High School in Norman, Oklahoma. In 2004 she received the "Director of Distinction" Award from the Oklahoma Choral Directors Association before retiring from public school teaching that year. Following her retirement from teaching, she served as Music and Worship Arts director at First Baptist Church in Norman for nearly ten years followed by three years at NorthHaven Church in Norman. She has also been a co-director and singer with the Oklahoma Ambassadors Concert Choir.

Patti has composed and arranged nearly 900 choral octavos, which have been nationally published by publishers including Hal Leonard, Shawnee Press, Excelcia, Jubilate Music Group and the Lorenz Publishing Company. She has served as a clinician and workshop presenter across the United States and Canada. Her recorded albums include Shelter in the Time of Storm (2007), A Mother Daughter Christmas (2023) with her daughter Emily Drennan, and Echoes of Grace (2024), which charted #1 on the Billboard chart. In 2022, she received the Distinguished Alumna Award from the Oklahoma State University College of Arts and Sciences for the Greenwood School of Music.

In 2025, Patti received a Grammy nomination in the Best Choral Performance category for the a cappella album Requiem of Light, composed with her Emily Drennan, conducted by Steven Fox with The Clarion Choir. The album also garnered the #7 position on the Billboard chart, as well as winning other awards.

=== Recording and production ===
Patti is a member of the Recording Academy and a published ASCAP lyricist. She also contributed as an arranger to the Grammy-nominated album Impossible Dream (2024) by Aaron Lazar.
