= Emily Drennan =

American singer and recording artist

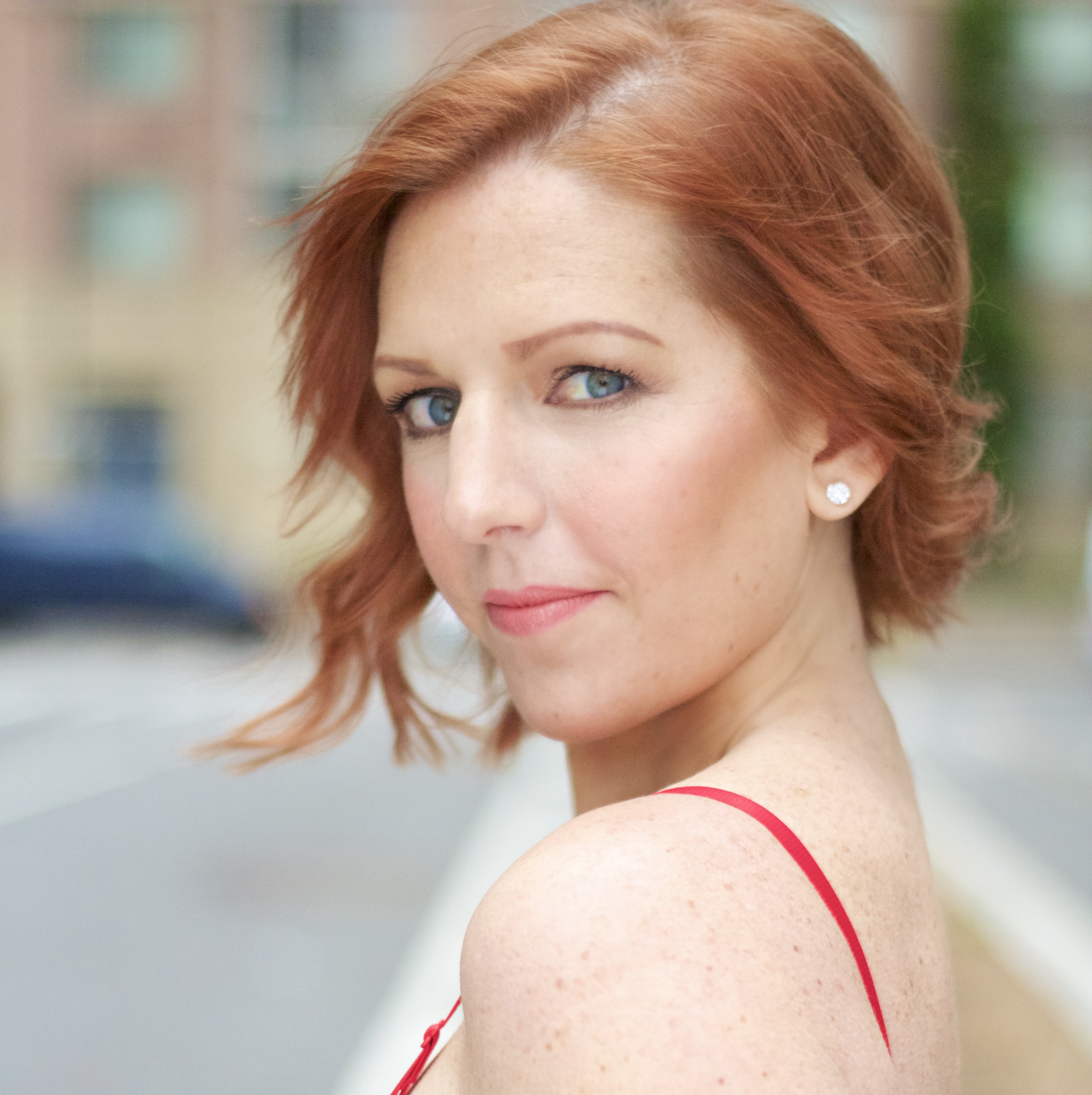

Background information
- Born: Norman, Oklahoma, U.S.
- Genres: Classical; Musical theatre; Choral
- Occupations: Singer; record producer; composer

Emily Drennan is an American singer and recording artist. She was nominated for a 2026 Grammy Award in the Best Choral Performance category for the album Requiem of Light (2025), on which she served as producer, chorus master, and featured vocalist.

== Life and career ==
Emily was born in Norman, Oklahoma. She graduated summa cum laude from Oklahoma State University with bachelor's degrees in Economics and Spanish, along with minors in Finance, Marketing, International Business, and Latin American Studies. She was named a National Presidential Scholar in the Arts and performed as a guest soloist at the John F. Kennedy Center for the Performing Arts.

=== Theater ===
Emily has performed in Broadway, Off-Broadway, and regional theatre productions, including Voca People (Off-Broadway), Mamma Mia!, and the 2016 New York Spectacular Starring the Radio City Rockettes at Radio City Music Hall. She was a member of the a cappella group Toxic Audio, which won a Drama Desk Award. She has appeared on The Tonight Show Starring Jimmy Fallon, and served as a featured soloist in Radio City Christmas Spectacular specials on NBC, PBS, and Netflix.

=== Symphonic and concert ===
Emily has performed as a guest soloist with orchestras, including the Cleveland Orchestra, Dallas Symphony Orchestra, Indianapolis Symphony Orchestra, Oklahoma City Philharmonic, Bravo! Vail, Pittsburgh Symphony Orchestra, Detroit Symphony Orchestra, Buffalo Philharmonic Orchestra, and Vancouver Symphony Orchestra. She has appeared at venues such as Carnegie Hall, Lincoln Center, and Radio City Music Hall.

=== Recording and production ===
Emily is a member of the Recording Academy and a published ASCAP lyricist. Her releases include her debut double-disc album Two-Way Street (2012), A Mother Daughter Christmas (2023) with her mother, Patti Drennan, and numerous singles, including "I Know Your Name" (2023). She also contributed vocals to the Grammy-nominated album Impossible Dream (2024) by Aaron Lazar.

Emily served as chorus master, producer, and vocalist on the Grammy-nominated Requiem of Light (2025).
