= Brian Mackey =

American singer-songwriter

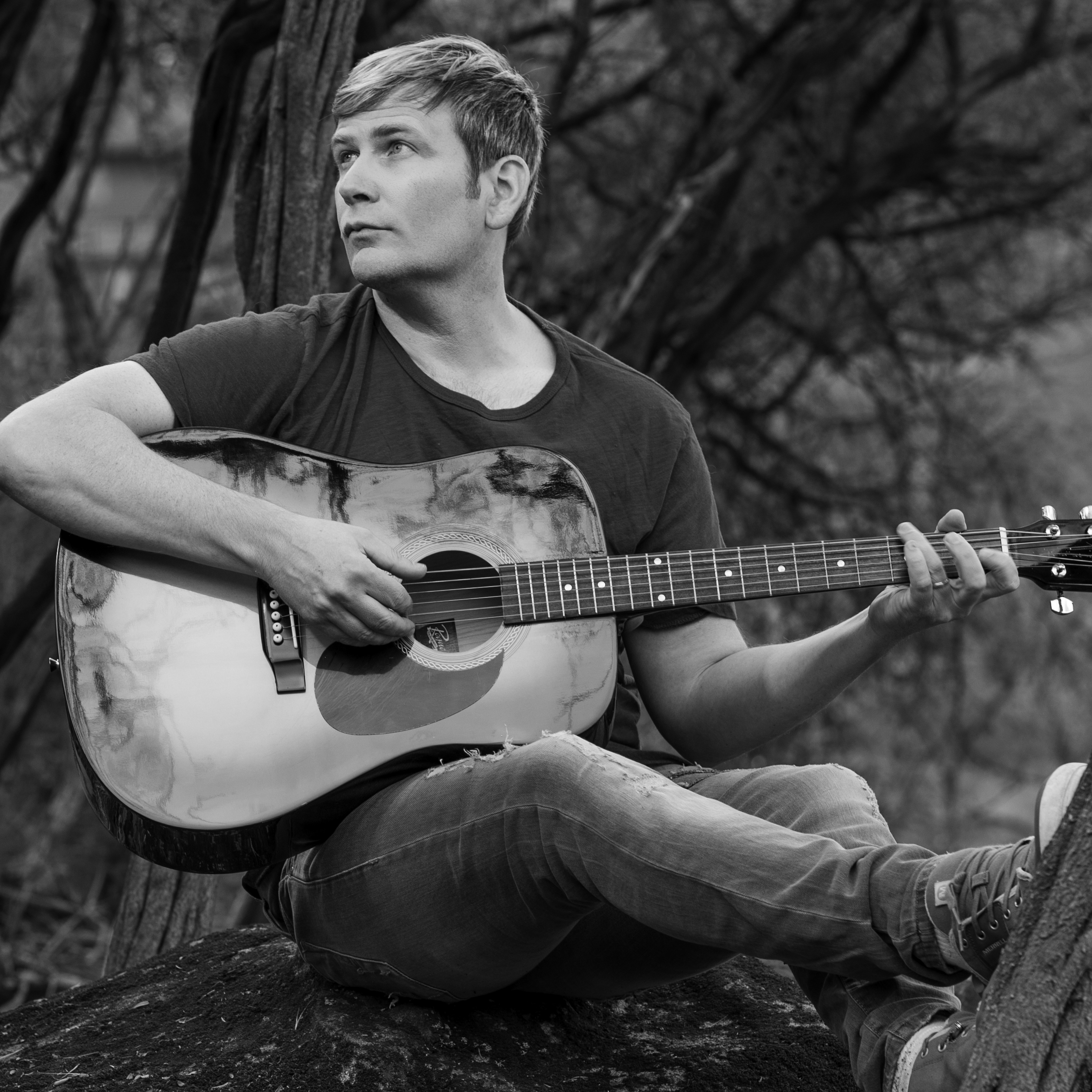

Background information
- Born: Lakewood, New Jersey, United States
- Genres: Americana; Pop
- Occupation(s): Singer-songwriter, guitarist, pianist, composer
- Labels: Red Pass Records
- Website: www.brianmackeymusic.com

Brian Keith Mackey is an American singer-songwriter, guitarist, pianist and composer based in New York City, USA. He began his professional music career as a solo artist in 2006. He has since released multiple EPs, singles and one full-length album leading to a range of successful placements in TV and film as well as selling out tours in the United States and across Europe, both solo and alongside other artists.

== Early life ==
Brian was born in Lakewood, New Jersey and was raised in Havana, Florida. He is the youngest son of three, spending his first few years at the Jersey Shore, and then most of his childhood in the northern Florida panhandle. He was raised on a diet of 90's alt-rock and 70's folk music. His grandmother played piano, sitting in at local clubs whilst his mother dabbled in songwriting and theatre. As a child, Brian was active in choir and theatre and impressed his teachers with a rendition of "The Star-Spangled Banner". Aged only seven, he was inspired to pursue his interest in music. After learning piano from his grandmother and picking up guitar from just a few lessons, Brian was eager to challenge himself by playing music he heard on the radio rather than what was assigned to him. In his teens, the family moved to Staten Island where he finished high school.

== Career ==
After high school, Brian initially played throughout Florida, New Jersey and New York in local bands. He took some time to travel the country playing music, ultimately landing back in New York where he came to realise writing his own solo material would help him master his craft and grow as an artist.

=== Debut EP and Honest Love ===
After writing and recording singles locally and sporadically in the early 2000s, Mackey officially released his first EP, Feng Shui for Slobs, in 2008 featuring the tracks "Painted Red", "Radio," and "Bandage". Two of the tracks on the EP were recorded by Sam Ashworth (The Civil Wars, Switchfoot) at the Arthouse Studio in Nashville, Tennessee. This release garnered his first commercial placement with "Painted Red" appearing on the Disney TV show Naturally Sadie. "Painted Red" then went on to be placed in the TV show Lachey's: Raising the Bar on the A&E Network.

2009 saw Mackey release his second EP, Brian Mackey Red. In 2010, he released his third EP, Honest Love. Songs from Honest Love were featured on Viso Music, US Airways In-Flight Radio, and the Songs of Love for Japan compilation, alongside Sara Bareilles and Ani DiFranco. Honest Love was chosen for a UNICEF, UK – Live Below the Line campaign, and for an Arla Foods campaign in Denmark. Mackey was also selected as a Supercuts Rock the Cut Artist Ambassador shortly after for two consecutive years. An instrumental version of the song "Honest Love" appeared on the MTV Tres show Quiero Mi Boda.

Two of Mackey's tracks, “Color Blue” and “Honest Love,” were sought out for use in motion pictures: Boys of Abu Ghraib; 29,000 Wishes, 1 Regret (directed by Oliver Robins); Fake (with actor Robert Loggia) and Fathoms Deep. "Color Blue" was also placed in the Lifetime TV Network thrillers My Life as a Dead Girl, Killing Mommy, and The Perfect Girlfriend. Another track from the EP, “Out On the Road”, was featured in Anthony Bourdain’s The Layover on the Travel Channel.

=== Broken Heartstrings ===
Brian released the single "America" in 2014, taken from his first full-length album, Broken Heartstrings, released later that year. His music video for "America" and Q+A premiered exclusively on CMT Edge, October 24, 2015, and was placed in rotation in Target Stores throughout the US, as well as the primary theme for an Armagosa Conservancy Campaign. His music video for "The Day" premiered exclusively on the Elmore Magazine website.

Broken Heartstrings also yielded the single "Are You Listening", which was featured in a gameplay video by popular YouTuber Gronkh for Sony PlayStation 4 game Until Dawn. The track peaked at No. 8 on the A/C Radio Charts in the US, charted on German iTunes, was on the ‘100 Most Sold’ chart on Amazon Germany and rapidly amassed over 400k streams on Spotify, resulting in a successful stint of sold-out shows throughout Germany during the fall. In 2016, Brian returned to Europe for solo shows in Germany and the UK before heading back to the US for the summer to take part in the "Camplified" tour partnered with Primary Wave Entertainment.

=== "Learn To Be" and "Underwater" ===
2017 saw the release of two more singles, recorded by LA-based producer Jon Levine (Rachel Platten, Dua Lipa). The first single, "Learn to Be", was mixed by Brian Malouf (Michael Jackson, Queen). The second, "Underwater", was mixed by Joe Zook (Katy Perry). Both singles produced music videos, the first shot by Caro Patlis in Argentina, which exclusively premiered on MusicNews.com.

The accompanying video for follow up single, "Underwater", was shot by director Sandy Stenzel in Los Angeles, premiered on Huffington Post and received an official nomination for a Hollywood Music in Media Award. During the summer of 2017, Mackey hit the road supporting grammy nominated musician David Bromberg, following up with a set of European dates with Americana artist Ron Pope in the fall.

Brian opened 2018 with a slot as direct support for musicians Jon McLaughlin and Howie Day, prior to the release of his single "Don’t Own Much" during the summer. Mackey supported this release with another tour in Europe alongside One Tree Hill stars Kate Voegele and Tyler Hilton.

== Discography ==
Title	Details
Feng Shui For Slobs (EP)	Release date: 2008; Label: Red Pass Records; Producer: Sam Asworth & Lance Stark
Brian Mackey Red (EP)	Release date: 2009; Label: Red Pass Records; Producer: Sam Ashworth & Lance Stark
Honest Love (EP)	Release date: 2010; Label: Red Pass Records; Producer: Sam Ashworth & Brian Mackey
America (Single)	Release date: 2014; Label: Red Pass Records; Producer: Sam Ashworth
Broken Heartstrings (Album)	Release date: 2014; Label: Red Pass Records; Producer: Sam Ashworth & Brian Mackey
Are You Listening (Single)	Release date: 2015; Label: Red Pass Records; Producer: Brian Mackey
Learn To Be (Single)	Release date: 2017; Label: Red Pass Records; Producer: Jon Levine
The American (Vinyl only)	Release date: 2017; Label: Red Pass Records
Underwater (Single)	Release date: 2017; Label: Red Pass Records; Producer: Jon Levine
Best Of Brian Mackey	Release date: 2017; Label: Red Pass Records
Don't Own Much (Single)	Release date: 2018; Label: Red Pass Records; Producer: Jon Levine
