= Evermore (song) =

2017 single by Dan Stevens

Song by Dan Stevens

from the album Beauty and the Beast: Original Motion Picture Soundtrack
- Released: March 10, 2017
- Recorded: 2016
- Length: 3:14
- Label: Walt Disney
- Composer: Alan Menken
- Lyricist: Tim Rice
- Producers: Alan Menken; Matt Sullivan; Michael Kosarin

"Evermore" is a song written by composer Alan Menken and lyricist Tim Rice for the musical fantasy film Beauty and the Beast (2017), a live-action remake of Disney's 1991 animated film of the same name. Originally recorded for the film by English actor Dan Stevens, who performs the song in his starring role as the eponymous Beast, "Evermore" was first released as a single by American singer Josh Groban on March 3, 2017. Stevens' version became available on March 10, 2017 when the film's soundtrack was released online, while Groban's cover is played during the film's closing credits.

In the animated film, the Beast barely sings because Menken and original Beauty and the Beast lyricist Howard Ashman had not been able to determine a moment in the film during which it would have been appropriate for the character to perform his own song. Initially, Menken had especially wanted the Beast to perform "If I Can't Love Her", a song he and Rice had written for the character to sing in the stage adaptation of the animated film, in the remake, but ultimately decided that an entirely new song that establishes that the Beast has finally learned how to love instead would be more suitable due to the film's three-act structure.

"Evermore" is a somber Broadway-influenced power ballad; its lyrics explore themes such as true love, heartbreak, loneliness and sacrifice. In Beauty and the Beast, "Evermore" is performed by the Beast shortly after he releases Belle from the castle so that she may return to the village and aid her father. Despite knowing that freeing her will further jeopardize his chances of becoming human again, the Beast realizes he loves Belle and ultimately sacrifices his own happiness in return for hers. Critical reception towards "Evermore" has been mostly positive, with both film and music critics dubbing it the best of the remake's original songs amidst comparisons to "If I Can't Love Her". Critics frequently recognized Stevens among the cast's best vocalists and agreed that "Evermore" was a strong contender for a Best Original Song nomination at the 90th Academy Awards, however it was not nominated for the category.

== Writing and recording ==
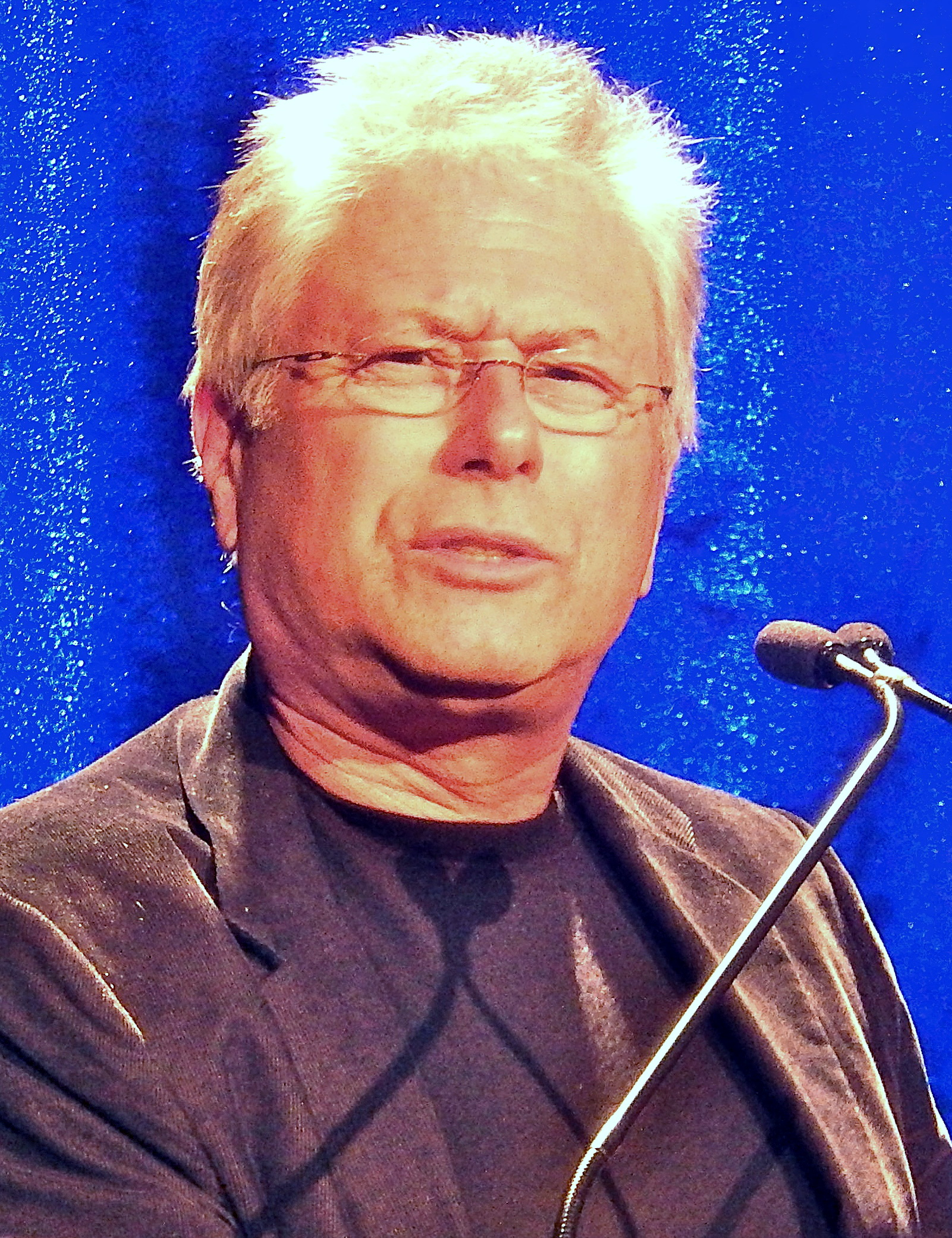
Composer Alan Menken wanted to include "If I Can't Love Her", a song he had written for the Beast in the Broadway adaptation, in the film, but was ultimately convinced to write "Evermore" instead.

Director Bill Condon had originally envisioned including most songs from the Broadway musical adaptation of Beauty and the Beast in the remake. However, Disney ultimately decided to recruit composer Alan Menken and lyricist Tim Rice to write entirely new songs for the film instead. Original Beauty and the Beast composer Menken reunited with Rice, with whom he had previously collaborated on Disney's animated film Aladdin (1992), to write three new songs for the remake. Rice once again replaced original Beauty and the Beast lyricist Howard Ashman, who had died shortly before the animated film's release, similar to the manner in which he replaced the lyricist to aid Menken in writing new material for the 1994 stage adaptation. Menken believes the songs he and Rice had written for the stage musical would not have translated well to the screen due to structural and pacing differences between the two formats.

In the animated film, the Beast does little singing apart from a brief solo during "Something There" because Menken and Ashman had been unable to agree upon a suitable moment during which the Beast could perform his own song. However, Menken considered it imperative that the character sing a solo in both the stage and live-action adaptations because he believes the Beast is actually the story's protagonist "whose life has changed in the most dramatic way." In the stage production, the Beast performs the ballad "If I Can't Love Her" after he frightens Belle away from the castle, wondering how he can possibly love anyone since he struggles to love her. Menken and Condon had debated whether or not to re-use the song in the remake; despite Menken's strong attachment to "If I Can't Love Her", the musical number was ultimately omitted because it had been written specifically to conclude the first act of a Broadway musical. Screenwriter Stephen Chbosky had originally suggested that the character receive a new song to perform some time after he has saved Belle from the wolves, although Menken and Rice had considered re-writing the song's lyrics into "Now that I've lost her" to better suit the scene. Due to the remake's three-act structure, Menken and Condon concluded it would be best to replace "If I Can't Love Her" with a song that better depicts the Beast's feelings for Belle after he has finally learned to love her and realizes she is no longer his prisoner, while accepting the grim reality that releasing her would ultimately decrease his chances of becoming human again. Rice further convinced the composer to substitute "If I Can't Love Her" with a more appropriate song, joking, "it would be like writing 'Don't Cry for Me Brazil'," referring to "Don't Cry for Me Argentina", a song he wrote for the stage musical Evita.

The songwriters determined that the moment Beast releases Belle and fears that he might have lost her was the only suitable moment in which the character could sing in the film. Menken also agreed that the moment Beast realizes Belle is no longer his prisoner would be a "more satisfying moment" for a musical number. Originally entitled "For Evermore", "Evermore" was written by composer Menken and lyricist Rice. The last of the three original songs written for the remake, "Evermore" was completed considerably late into production after the filmmakers finally agreed that the Beast should perform his own. Written in Spring 2015 in London, England, Menken quickly composed its melody before Rice contributed lyrics revolving around the Beast releasing Belle. Actor Dan Stevens, who portrays the Beast and performs "Evermore", had little singing experience prior to being cast in the film. Before "Evermore" was written, Condon informed Stevens that he would be singing a new song in his role as Beast. Having not sung professionally since childhood, Stevens was required to retrain his singing voice, the process of which he found challenging. To prepare for the recording, Stevens received extensive vocal coaching from vocal coach Ann-Marie Speed in addition to working closely with Menken. Stevens first recorded a "guide track" for "Evermore" before he and Menken revisited the track to modify specific lines and notes. To make the actor sound more "beast-like", sound engineers digitally modified Stevens' voice, which Menken produced with Matt Sullivan and Michael Kosarin. Auto-Tune was used to make Stevens' voice sound lower and heavier. Menken continued making minor changes to the song well into production. On recording a new song, Stevens said, "the pressure's sort of off — but it's also on — because it doesn't have to sound like it did before, but it should sound good enough to sit alongside the music that's already pretty great." Stevens agreed that the song is "a big, romantic, soaring number" about the Beast lamenting "I've fallen in love with her, and now she's buggered off, woe is me", while "If I Can't Love Her" is "How am I going to fall in love with her?" Replacing "If I Can't Love Her" with "Evermore" helped make the songwriters eligible for an Academy Award nomination for Best Original Song.

Stevens' version of "Evermore" was released on March 10, 2017 as a track on the Beauty and the Beast soundtrack. Menken's demo version of the song is included on deluxe editions of the album.

== Context and use in Beauty and the Beast ==
One of at least nine significant ways the remake deviates from its source material, "Evermore" is among the film's songs that emphasize the sadness and loneliness of both the Beast and Belle's situations. Occurring approximately two-thirds into the film, the song assumes a role that was originally occupied by the song "If I Can't Love Her" in the Broadway musical, identified by Fred Hawson of ABS-CBN News as "a grand moving solo" during which the Beast sincerely expresses his undying feelings for Belle. In Beauty and the Beast, "Evermore" appears as a solo performed by the Beast shortly before "The Mob Song" as the film approaches its dramatic climax. After the Beast and Belle (Emma Watson) share a dance in the castle's ballroom to Mrs. Potts (Emma Thompson) singing "Beauty and the Beast", the couple has a conversation during which the Beast learns how much Belle actually misses her father, Maurice (Kevin Kline). Finally admitting that Belle is no longer his prisoner, the character sings "Evermore" shortly after he releases the heroine from the castle, insisting that she return to her village and protect Maurice from Gaston (Luke Evans). Believing that Belle has been lost to him forever, the Beast is heartbroken by the character's departure and laments his misfortune by performing "Evermore", accepting that releasing his former prisoner makes breaking the enchantress' spell more difficult, even impossible. Serving as a culmination of both the Beast's personal and emotional journeys, Tracy Goldman of The Cornell Daily Sun observed that the song "adds more depth to the character" by "highlighting the changes he goes through throughout the movie."

Similar to "If I Can't Love Her", "Evermore" provides the Beast with "a stronger voice". The song occurs at a pivotal moment in the film during which the Beast bemoans his decision to release Belle, uncovering both his inner pain and character growth as he voices "a sad sense of longing". For the first time, audiences learn exactly how the Beast feels when he frees Belle to rescue Maurice. In the musical sequence, the Beast continues to climb higher up the turrets of his castle to watch Belle as she rides away on her horse and gradually disappears into the distance. The orchestra increases and swells as the anguished Beast continues to climb. Menken explained that the character watches Belle leave while thinking to himself "I know what love is now, and it's wonderful, even though I'll never see her again". "Evermore" captures the Beast's agony as he watches the woman he loves leave him. Whereas "If I Can't Love Her" allowed the character to remain in one location for three minutes, the film required him to be somewhere different from where he began the end of the song. Condon observed that the song reflects the Beast's actions, both musically and lyrically ascending as the character "climb[s] higher and higher in the castle so that he can still keep sight of her and so that he can see her for as long as he possibly can."

Citing the song as an example of the film's characters resorting to singing whenever they find that they are not able to speak, Condon described "Evermore" as one of the film's "dramatic high points", proving that the Beast has finally become "worthy of love". For the Beast, the song represents "an ode to his love for Belle and his unending, longing devotion as she rides away from him, possibly forever", serving as "a profound meditation on his own isolation and heartache". According to Menken, the character is "basically singing about how he now knows what love is". The Beast is now shown to be capable of feeling and expressing human emotions, namely heartbreak, loneliness and helplessness, having learned about true love and sacrifice. According to Zoe Nicholson of The Daily Gamecock, "Evermore" "adds humanity not yet seen in a character regarded as savage or spoiled rotten." Walt Disney Studios president of music and soundtracks Mitchell Leib described the scene as the film's "Phantom of the Opera moment." Traditionally in Disney films, heroines are typically assigned "rousing" musical numbers to perform. Screen Rant contributor Kacey Spivey observed that Belle's departure and the scene represents a reversal of the traditional fairy tale trope in which a princess is trapped in a tower. Instead the Beast is confined to his tower, longing for the heroine to return and free him from his enchantment. Brett Nachman compared the scene to Quasimodo performing "Out There" in Disney's animated musical The Hunchback of Notre Dame (1996).

== Music and lyrics ==
Distinguished for being the remake's "most powerful" original song, music critics have described "Evermore" as a big, romantic number. A "soaring ballad" supported by "grand orchestration", WTOP's Jason Fraley described "Evermore" as a "haunting song of longing". A "mournful love song", it crescendos into a soaring lament about longing for a lost love. Delivered as an emotional power ballad, its instrumentation begins with the Beast's "eerie" "Rose" theme, before transitioning into a musical solo based on the track's melody and bridge. Despite being a "lovesick ballad" reminiscent of songs from the stage musical Les Misérables, the ballad is a more upbeat offering than its Broadway counterpart, "If I Can't Love Her". However, the track remains one of the more melancholy inclusions on a soundtrack largely consisting of upbeat musical numbers. Writing for Elle, Alyssa Bailey deemed the song Broadway's version of a breakup ballad, which features the lyrics "I let her steal into my melancholy heart/It's more than I can bear". Musically, the track bears similarities to songs from Disney's animated film The Hunchback of Notre Dame (1996), which Menken also composed, and has been likened to the work of composer Andrew Lloyd Webber.

"Evermore"'s melody is paired with lyrics that express loneliness, accompanied by heavy orchestration that swells as the ballad progresses. Simultaneously "brooding" and hopeful, Jay Jason of ComicBook.com believes the song's lyrics are inspired by the popular phrase "If you love someone, let them go". Stevens' voice quivers with emotion when he sings "I never needed anybody in my life", which Amanda Greever of The Daily Times insisted will move listeners to tears. Featuring lyrics that explore heartache and heartbreak, "Evermore"'s chorus reads: "Now I know she'll never leave me/Even as she runs away/She will still torment me/Call me, hurt me/Move me, come what may/Wasting in my lonely tower/Waiting by an open door/I'll fool myself, she'll walk right in/And be with me for evermore". The track also discusses themes such as true love, sacrifice, and learning to understand love.

Stevens sings within the vocal range of a "deep, resonating baritone" throughout the song, which lasts three minutes and fourteen seconds in duration. Channel NewsAsia contributor Genevieve Sarah Loh compared Stevens' voice to "melted-chocolate", which gradually becomes more human-sounding as the song progresses. Belting comfortably, Stevens' voice has been compared to that of Terrence Mann, the actor who originated the role of the Beast in the Broadway adaptation and recorded "If I Can't Love Her". Mumbling slightly, Stevens begin the song using a more "guttural" part of his voice in an effort to impersonate the sound of a beast before the song truly progresses into "a soaring love ballad". Some traces of Auto-Tune can be heard in Stevens' performance.

== Reception ==
"Evermore" received generally positive reviews from film and music critics, becoming a fan favorite. When Disney released the film's first official trailer in November 2016, Billboard's Taylor Weatherby ranked "Evermore" the fifth most-anticipated song from the remake. Vulture.com's Sarah Caldwell commended Disney's bravery to immediately follow-up the film's most famous song with an original song. Writing for Stuff.co.nz, James Croot appreciated "Evermore" for enhancing the film by allowing the Beast to sing. Katlin Risen of The State Journal-Register and Andrew Gaug of News-Press NOW called the song a welcome addition to the story. Citing "Evermore" among the film's musical highlights, the Christian Broadcasting Network reviewed the track as "a wonderful, heartbreaking ballad". Lindsay Bahr of the Associated Press felt "Evermore" was "more fitting" for the character than "If I Can't Love Her", while Her Campus's Justine Steiner called it "infectious". Xposé's Marese O'Sullivan claims to have "adored" the song upon hearing it for the first time. Cameron Meier of Orlando Weekly lauded "Evermore" as the film's dramatic highlight, which he nearly rewarded with a standing ovation, while Metro's Sarah Deen dubbed it "an instant classic". Writing for the British Film Institute, Kate Stables opined that "Evermore" remains "the only standout among the film’s forgettable trio of new songs".

Critics agreed that Stevens' vocal performance was a musical highlight of the film. The Yakima Herald-Republic's Danielle Niemann, Jason Fraley of WTOP, and Varsity contributor Robert Crawford agreed that the actor's voice was chill-inducing, while The Salt Lake Tribune's Sean P. Means said the ballad "gives Stevens a nice moment to pour out the tragic hero's broken heart". According to the Toronto Star's Peter Howell, "Evermore" establishes Stevens as one of the cast's best singers, while La Presse's Sonia Sarfati found the actor's performance moving. CIHR-FM's Shelby Knox concluded that Stevens "shows a lot of promise" despite his limited singing experience. Meanwhile, MTV ranked "Evermore" fourth on their "All 14 Songs from Disney's Live-action Beauty and the Beast" ranking; author Crystal Bell claims she would have it ranked it higher had Stevens' voice not been manipulated. Bell went on to write that the song sounds like "a B side off The Hunchback of Notre Dame", which she insists is "the highest compliment I can give a song."

Calling the track inferior to "If I Can't Love Her", ReelViews film critic James Berardinelli found "Evermore" "solid" but unmemorable. However, Berardinelli deemed Stevens' voice the strongest among the film's cast, wishing his character was allowed "more opportunities to use it". Angie Han of Mashable said the song fares marginally better than "How Does a Moment Last Forever" and "Days in the Sun", but ultimately accused it of slowing down the film. Maria Sciullo of the Pittsburgh Post-Gazette found the ballad to be lacking power and criticized Stevens' use of Auto-Tune, while Zimbio contributor Lani Conway called his voice "confusing". IGN's Eric Goldman was unimpressed with the track, dismissing "Evermore" as uninspired and unmemorable, while Alexandra August of Comic Book Resources reviewed "Evermore" as "excessively sentimental", "meandering", and "mopey". The Rolla Daily News critic Dana Barbuto found the song "less soaring than intended", while Katie Walsh, writing for The Sun Chronicle, relegated "Evermore" to "the perfect bathroom break"; a "snooze-worthy tune does nothing for the already dragging story". In a mixed review, the Daily Bruin's Matthew Fernandez described "Evermore" as one of two songs "that matches the grandeur of the classic Disney works" but criticized Steven's vocals, which he found "less pleasing to the ear" due to Stevens' impersonation of a beast, dismissing the attempt as "cheesy" and harmful to the actor's performance.

Some journalists felt "Evermore" was a strong contender for an Academy Award for Best Original Song nomination. Paul Sheehan of Golderby theorized that the Academy of Motion Picture Arts and Sciences would most likely favor "Evermore" over "How Does a Moment Last Forever" and "Days in the Sun". In December 2017, the Academy of Motion Picture Arts and Sciences revealed that "Evermore" was one among 70 songs that the organization shortlisted for Best Original Song consideration. Ultimately, "Evermore" did not earn a nomination in the category, which some critics have viewed as a snub given the popularity of the song and the film. "Evermore" was nominated for Best Song at the 2018 Critics' Choice Awards, losing to "Remember Me" from Pixar's Coco (2017).

== International versions ==
On its theater release, the movie numbered 32 dubbings worldwide, with the song Evermore counting 31 versions overall: Yoni Amar's recording of the song was used in both French versions released in Europe and Canada, although the rest of the two dubbings was independent. Yiánnis Palamídas, Greek voice actor of the Beast, had already dubbed this character in the original animated version: he reprised his role in the live-action 24 years later.

"Evermore" worldwide
Language	Performer	Title	Translation
Bulgarian	Михаил Сървански (Mikhail Sŭrvanski)	Unknown	Unknown
Croatian	Filip Riđički	Unknown	Unknown
Czech	Viktor Dyk	"Dál si nalhávám"	"I keep lying to myself"
Danish	Tomas Kofod	"Den jeg lever for"	"The one I live for"
English	Dan Stevens	"Evermore"	
Finnish	Tuukka Leppänen	"Ikuisesti häntä ootan"	"I will wait evermore for her"
Flemish	Mike Wauters	"Voor altijd"	"Forever"
French	Yoni Amar	"Ensemble à jamais"	"Forever together"
German	Sascha Rotermund	"Ich warte hier auf dich"	"I wait for you here"
Greek	Γιάννης Παλαμίδας (Yiánnis Palamídas)	"Για πάντα εδώ'" ("Gia pánta edó")	"Here forever"
Hebrew	אסף פריינטא (Asaf Priente)	"פה בארמון" ("Po ba'armon")	"Here in the castle"
Hindi	राजा सेवक (Raja Sevak)	"मेरे पास" ("Mere paas")	"With me"
Hungarian	Pál Tamás	"Örökre már"	"Forever"
Italian	Luca Velletri	"Per sempre"	"Forever"
Japanese	山崎育三郎 (Yamasaki Ikusaburō)	"ひそかな夢" ("Hisoka na yume")	"A secret dream"
Korean	황만익 (Hwang Man-Ik)	"항상" ("Hangsang")	"Always"
Mandarin Chinese	王凱 (Kai Wang)	"永久" ("Yǒngjiǔ")	"Eternal"
Norwegian	Håvard Bakke	"Udyrets sorg"	"Song of the beast"
Polish	Hubert Zapiór	"Aż po zmierzch"	"Until dusk"
Portuguese (Brazil)	Fábio Azevedo	"Nunca mais"	"Nevermore"
Portuguese (Europe)	Mário Redondo	"Um eterno amor"	"An eternal love"
Romanian	—N/a	Unknown	Unknown
Russian	Андрей Бирин (Andrey Birin)	"Растает лёд" ("Rastaet lëd")	"Ice will melt"
Serbian	Борис Режак (Boris Režak)	"Зар је живот ова ноћ" ("Zar je život ova noć")	"Is this night truly what life is?"
Slovak	Alexander Maďar	Unknown	Unknown
Spanish (Europe)	Ignasi Vidal	"Esperándola sin más"	"Waiting for her forever"
Spanish (Latin America)	Jair Campos	"Vuelve el amor"	"Love returns"
Swedish	Daniel Engman	"Kärleken blir aldrig vår"	"Love will never be ours"
Thai	กิตตินันท์ ชินสำราญ (Kittinan Chinsamran)	"ชั่วกาล" ("Chàw kāl")	"Forever"
Turkish	Onur Kırış	Unknown	Unknown
Ukrainian	Сергій Кияшко (Serhii Kyiashko)	"Це лиш сон" ("Tse lysh son")	"This is a dream"

== Chart performance ==
Although Stevens' version of the song was never released as a single, its popularity combined with that of the film and its related soundtrack resulted in the track charting on several charts due to digital download sales. "Evermore" peaked at number 18 and 46 on the US Billboard Bubbling Under Hot 100 Singles and US Digital Songs charts, respectively, on April 8, 2017, spending one week on both charts.

Chart (2017)	Peak position
US Bubbling Under Hot 100 (Billboard)	18
US Digital Song Sales (Billboard)	46

== Certifications ==
Region	Certification	Certified units/sales
United Kingdom (BPI)	Silver	200,000^{‡}
United States (RIAA)	Platinum	1,000,000^{‡}
^{‡} Sales+streaming figures based on certification alone.

== Josh Groban version ==
"Evermore"

Single by Josh Groban

from the album Beauty and the Beast: Original Motion Picture Soundtrack
- Released: March 3, 2017
- Recorded: January 2017
- Genre: Operatic pop
- Length: 3:09
- Label: Walt Disney
- Composer: Alan Menken
- Lyricist: Tim Rice
- Producer: Martin Nessi

Following the release of Ariana Grande and John Legend's pop rendition of "Beauty and the Beast", Leib asked the studio for permission to release another one of Beauty and the Beast's original songs as a single ahead of the film's March 17, 2017 release date. After eliminating "Days in the Sun" and confirming that Canadian singer Celine Dion would not be available to promote her cover of "How Does a Moment Last Forever", the studio ultimately decided to release "Evermore". Menken and Condon had been discussing which contemporary recording artist would be capable of delivering a song as vocally "demanding" as "Evermore". After briefly considering Italian opera singer Andrea Bocelli, Leib suggested American singer Josh Groban because, in his opinion, the singer's "voice is a natural fit for this showstopper of a composition." Having already known Groban personally, Menken texted the singer who immediately confirmed his interest. Groban recorded the song shortly after the studio made final arrangements with his manager.

On January 26, 2017, Disney announced that Groban had recorded a cover of "Evermore" – still entitled "For Evermore", at the time – and revealed that his version would be included on the remake's soundtrack in addition to being played during the film's end credits. Groban released a statement, saying: "I am honored to sing this beautiful new song by two of my absolute favorites, Alan Menken and Tim Rice. Beauty and the Beast has been with me since my childhood and to have a musical connection to this new film makes me so happy." The announcement coincided with the studio's release of a new promotional poster for the film, which Disney allowed the singer to premiere using his official Twitter account. A 30-second sample of the track was uploaded to SoundCloud on February 14, 2017, which Groban also shared on Twitter. Groban's version was released as the second single from Beauty and the Beast's soundtrack on March 3, 2017, several days before the album, on which Stevens' original rendition appears, was released. Groban promoted the song with a performance on Good Morning America on March 14, 2017. The occasion marked both the song's first televised performance, as well as the first time an original song from the remake was performed live on television.

Musically, Groban's single remains a "Broadway-like" operatic pop ballad that features the same lyrics, beginning "I was the one who had it all". Written in the key of A major at moderately slow tempo of 96 beats per minute, Groban's three-minutes-and-nine-seconds rendition evokes a "sweeping, operatic quality", featuring lyrics revolving about pining for true love. At the same time, the single resembles contemporary Disney ballads such as Sarah McLachlan's "When She Loved Me" and Phil Collins' "You'll Be In My Heart" from the animated films Toy Story 2 and Tarzan, both of which were released in 1999, respectively. According to Golderby's Paul Sheehan, the track is Groban's "heartbreaking rendition of" a "plaintive plea for love." The song garnered positive reviews from critics that distinguished it from the mild controversies that had been surrounding the film at the time of its release. Devan Coggan of Entertainment Weekly described the song as a "gorgeous ballad", while Den of Geek praised Groban's interpretation as "immeasurable". According to Elle writer Alyssa Bailey, Groban's emotional performance will cause listeners to "feel the Beast's feels". Dubbing the track "one of the highlights of the album", the Daily Bruin's Matthew Fernandez reviewed the ballad as "a grand uplifting ballad centered on Groban's rich voice". Vulture.com's Sarah Caldwell admitted to listening to both Groban and Stevens' versions of the song back-to-back with "zero ounces of shame." 34th Street Magazine contributor Haley Weiss preferred Groban's version to Stevens' original, calling it "breathtaking and downright lovely to listen to" while dismissing the film version as "downright mediocre in comparison." Weiss questioned why Disney hadn't cast Groban as the Beast instead of Stevens due to the former's acting and musical theatre background.

Groban would again sing the song as the Beast for 2022's Beauty and the Beast: A 30th Celebration on ABC.
