= Beauty and the Beast (2017 soundtrack) =

Soundtrack album by Various artists
- Released: March 10, 2017
- Recorded: 2015–2016
- Studio: Abbey Road Studios; Air Lyndhurst Studios; British Grove Studios
- Genre: Film soundtrack
- Length: 53:43; 131:56 (Deluxe Edition)
- Label: Walt Disney
- Producer: Alan Menken; Matt Sullivan; Mitchell Leib

Singles from Beauty and the Beast
- 1. "Beauty and the Beast" Released: February 2, 2017; 2. "Evermore" Released: March 3, 2017

Beauty and the Beast is the soundtrack album to the 2017 film Beauty and the Beast. The album, largely based on material from Disney's 1991 animated version, features score and songs composed by Alan Menken with lyrics by Howard Ashman and three new songs composed by Menken with lyrics by Tim Rice. The soundtrack album was released by Walt Disney Records on March 10, 2017.

The songs feature vocals from the film's ensemble cast including Emma Watson, Dan Stevens, Luke Evans, Kevin Kline, Josh Gad, Ewan McGregor, Stanley Tucci, Audra McDonald, Gugu Mbatha-Raw, Ian McKellen, Emma Thompson, Adam Mitchell, Nathan Mack, Clive Rowe, Gerard Horan, and Haydn Gwynne.

== Track listing ==
All music is composed by Alan Menken.

No.	Title	Lyrics	Performers	Length
1.	"Overture"			3:05
2.	"Main Title: Prologue Pt. 1" (Includes narration by Hattie Morahan)			0:42
3.	"Aria"	Tim Rice	Audra McDonald	1:02
4.	"Main Title: Prologue Pt. 2" (Includes narration by Hattie Morahan)			2:21
5.	"Belle"	Howard Ashman	Emma Watson; Luke Evans; Ensemble	5:33
6.	"How Does a Moment Last Forever (Music Box)"	Rice	Kevin Kline	1:03
7.	"Belle (Reprise)"	Ashman	Watson	1:15
8.	"Gaston"	Ashman	Luke Evans; Josh Gad; Ensemble	4:25
9.	"Be Our Guest"	Ashman	Ewan McGregor; Emma Thompson; Gugu Mbatha-Raw; Ian McKellen	4:48
10.	"Days in the Sun"	Rice	Adam Mitchell; Stanley Tucci; McGregor; Mbatha-Raw; Thompson; McDonald; Watson; McKellen; Clive Rowe	2:40
11.	"Something There"	Ashman	Watson; Dan Stevens; Thompson; Nathan Mack; McKellen; McGregor; Mbatha-Raw	2:54
12.	"How Does a Moment Last Forever (Montmartre)"	Rice	Watson	1:55
13.	"Beauty and the Beast"	Ashman	Thompson	3:19
14.	"Evermore"	Rice	Stevens	3:14
15.	"The Mob Song"	Ashman	Evans; Gad; Ensemble; Watson; McKellen; Tucci; Mack; Mbatha-Raw; McGregor; Gerard Horan; Haydn Gwynne	2:28
16.	"Beauty and the Beast (Finale)"	Ashman	McDonald; Thompson; Ensemble	2:14
17.	"How Does a Moment Last Forever"	Rice	Celine Dion	3:37
18.	"Beauty and the Beast"	Ashman	Ariana Grande; John Legend	3:47
19.	"Evermore"	Rice	Josh Groban	3:09
Total length:				53:43

Deluxe edition – disc one (bonus tracks)
No.	Title	Lyrics	Performers	Length
20.	"Aria" (demo)	Rice	Menken	0:36
21.	"How Does a Moment Last Forever (Music Box)" (demo)	Rice	Menken	0:59
22.	"Days in the Sun" (demo)	Rice	Menken	3:30
23.	"How Does a Moment Last Forever (Montmartre)" (demo)	Rice	Menken	1:21
24.	"Evermore" (demo)	Rice	Menken	2:55
Total length:				63:05

Deluxe edition – disc two
No.	Title	Length
1.	"Main Title: Prologue"	3:01
2.	"Belle Meets Gaston"	0:54
3.	"Your Mother"	2:13
4.	"The Laverie"	1:22
5.	"Wolf Chase"	3:14
6.	"Entering the Castle"	1:18
7.	"A White Rose"	3:57
8.	"The Beast"	4:03
9.	"Meet the Staff"	1:00
10.	"Home (extended mix)"	2:04
11.	"Madame de Garderobe"	1:28
12.	"There's a Beast"	2:02
13.	"A Petal Drops"	1:02
14.	"A Bracing Cup of Tea"	2:06
15.	"The West Wing"	2:58
16.	"Wolves Attack Belle"	3:17
17.	"The Library"	3:05
18.	"Colonnade Chat"	2:54
19.	"The Plague"	0:51
20.	"Maurice Accuses Gaston"	2:01
21.	"Beast Takes a Bath"	1:21
22.	"The Dress"	1:01
23.	"You Must Go to Him"	2:50
24.	"Belle Stops the Wagon"	2:42
25.	"Castle Under Attack"	4:20
26.	"Turret Pursuit"	2:12
27.	"You Came Back"	5:13
28.	"Transformations"	4:06
Total length:		68:50

- Deluxe editions on streaming services open with tracks 17–19 on disc one, maintaining the same running order after that.

== Commercial performance ==
The album debuted at No. 3 on the Billboard 200 chart with 57,000 units, 48,000 of which are traditional album sales. It has sold 337,000 copies in the United States as of July 2017.

== Charts ==
=== Weekly charts ===
Chart (2017)	Peak position
Australian Albums (ARIA)	4
Austrian Albums (Ö3 Austria)	10
Belgian Albums (Ultratop Flanders)	5
Belgian Albums (Ultratop Wallonia)	11
Canadian Albums (Billboard)	7
Danish Albums (Hitlisten)	32
Dutch Albums (Album Top 100)	33
Finnish Albums (Suomen virallinen lista)	23
Irish Albums (IRMA)	8
Italian Compilation Albums (FIMI)	5
Mexican Albums (AMPROFON) (Spanish version)	11
New Zealand Albums (RMNZ)	7
Norwegian Albums (VG-lista)	12
Polish Albums (ZPAV)	46
Scottish Albums (Official Charts)	6
South Korean Albums (Gaon)	34
South Korean Albums International (Gaon)	1
Spanish Albums (Promusicae)	7
Swiss Albums (Schweizer Hitparade)	19
UK Albums (Official Charts)	8
UK Soundtrack Albums (Official Charts)	1
US Billboard 200	3
US Soundtrack Albums (Billboard)	1

=== Year-end charts ===
Chart (2017)	Position
Australian Albums (ARIA)	37
Belgian Albums (Ultratop Flanders)	87
Belgian Albums (Ultratop Wallonia)	158
Japanese Albums (Billboard Japan)	58
UK Albums (OCC)	63
US Billboard 200	45
US Kid Albums (Billboard)	17
US Soundtrack Albums (Billboard)	3

Chart (2018)	Position
US Soundtrack Albums (Billboard)	21

== Certifications ==
Region	Certification	Certified units/sales
Canada (Music Canada)	Gold	40,000^{‡}
United Kingdom (BPI)	Silver	60,000^{‡}
United States (RIAA)	Gold	500,000^{‡}
^{‡} Sales+streaming figures based on certification alone.

== See also ==
- Beauty and the Beast (2017 film)
- Beauty and the Beast (1991 soundtrack)
