= How Does a Moment Last Forever =

2017 song by Tim Rice and Alan Menken

Song by Kevin Kline

from the album Beauty and the Beast
- Released: March 10, 2017
- Genre: Show tune
- Length: 1:04
- Label: Walt Disney
- Composer: Alan Menken
- Lyricist: Tim Rice
- Producers: Alan Menken; Matt Sullivan; Michael Kosarin

How Does a Moment Last Forever is a song written by lyricist Tim Rice and composer Alan Menken for the live‑action Disney film Beauty and the Beast (2017), a remake of the 1991 animated musical. In the film, the ballad is performed by American actor Kevin Kline as Maurice, reflecting on memories of his late wife, the mother of Belle. Later in the story, Belle (Emma Watson) reprises the song when she learns the truth about her mother's past. A separate pop version, recorded by Canadian singer Celine Dion, appears over the end credits and was included on the film's soundtrack, released on March 10, 2017.

In the original animated film, Maurice does not sing. The 2017 remake expands the backstories of both Belle and the Beast, providing additional context for their characters and motivations. Director Bill Condon explained that these additions were intended to clarify how Belle and the Beast became outsiders within their respective worlds.

"How Does a Moment Last Forever" is a reflective ballad centered on themes of memory and emotional continuity. Menken described it as a meditation on preserving meaningful moments. Within the film, the song accompanies two key scenes: Maurice's remembrance of his wife and Belle's discovery of her mother's fate. Dion was approached to record a pop rendition; although initially hesitant, she accepted due to the importance that Beauty and the Beast had in her career. Because she was unable to promote the track, Disney selected Evermore as the primary single. Dion's version nonetheless achieved modest international visibility alongside the film's commercial success. Critical reception was generally positive, though some reviewers regarded the song as less distinctive than other entries in her catalogue.

== Production ==
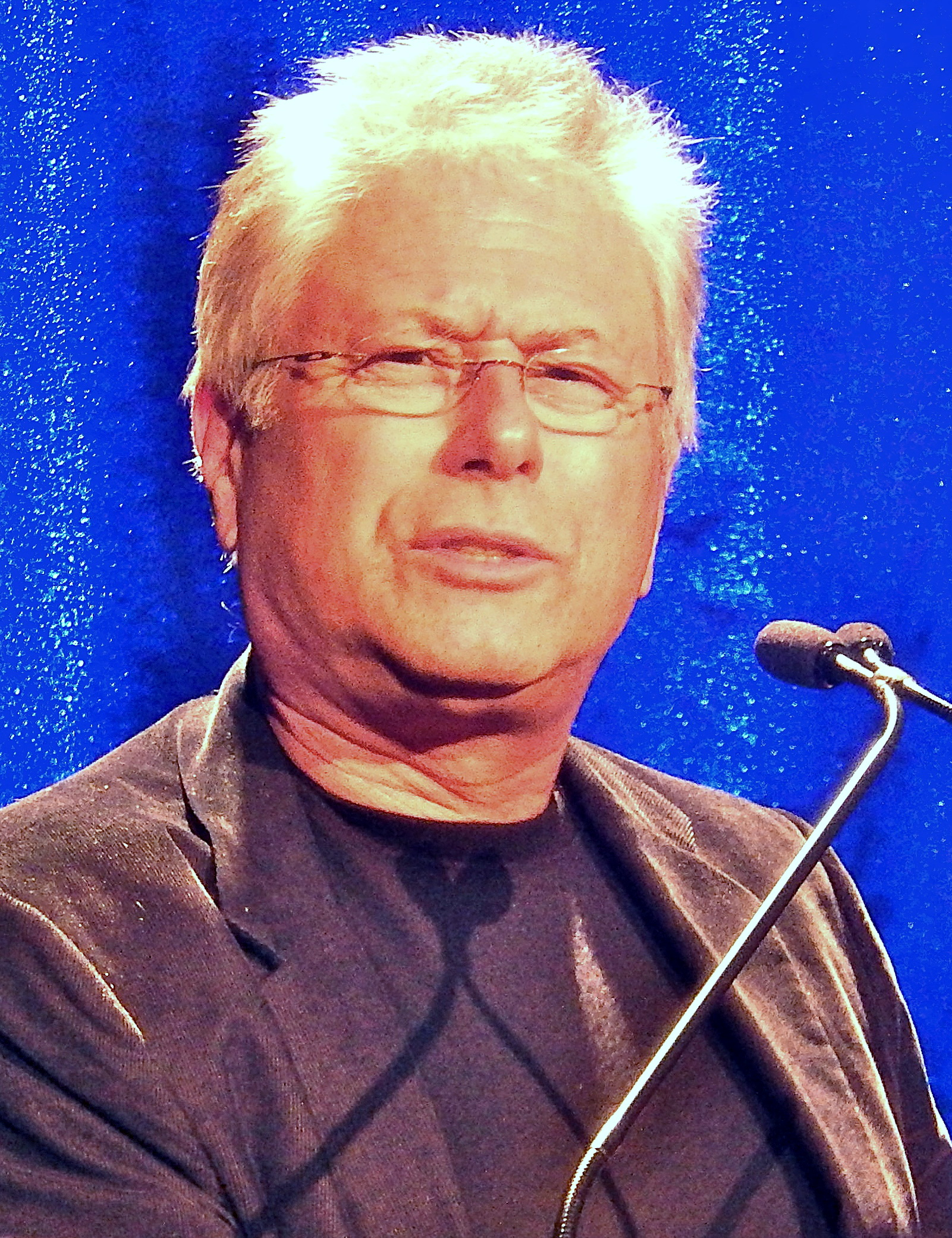
Composer Alan Menken in 2013

Director Bill Condon initially considered incorporating songs from the Broadway adaptation of Beauty and the Beast into the live‑action remake. Disney ultimately chose to commission new material from composer Alan Menken and lyricist Tim Rice. Menken, who wrote the original score for the 1991 film, reunited with Rice, his collaborator on the 1994 stage musical, to compose three new songs for the remake. One of these, "How Does a Moment Last Forever", was originally titled "Our Song Lives On".

Rice again assumed the role previously held by Howard Ashman, the lyricist for the animated film, who died in 1991 from complications related to HIV. The remake marked Menken and Rice's first collaboration in more than two decades; their previous joint project had been the stage musical. Menken noted that the Broadway songs would not have translated effectively to a cinematic format because of structural differences between theatre and film.

== Context and use in Beauty and the Beast ==
One of several major additions created specifically for the live‑action adaptation, "How Does a Moment Last Forever" was introduced to expand Belle's backstory. Her search for information about her mother mirrors the Beast's own childhood loss. In the film, the song is first performed by Maurice (Kline) shortly after the opening number "Belle". When Belle (Watson) returns to their home in the village, she quietly observes her father working on a music box. Maurice sings "How Does a Moment Last Forever" while recalling his late wife and their life in Paris. When he notices Belle watching, he finishes the music box — designed to resemble himself and his wife — and avoids answering her questions about her mother. Bustle writer Olivia Truffaut-Wong noted that "it's obvious that he's still holding on to her". This rendition appears on the soundtrack under the title "Music Box".

Later in the film, the Beast (Dan Stevens) allows Belle to use his enchanted book, which can transport them to any place she chooses. Belle selects the Paris home where she lived as an infant. There, while singing "How Does a Moment Last Forever", she and the Beast discover a plague mask, leading Belle to learn that her mother died of the plague. A flashback shows that Belle's mother insisted Maurice leave her behind to save their child, a decision he made with great sorrow. The scene deepens Belle's character and strengthens her connection with the Beast. According to Truffaut-Wong, Belle shares "an extremely intimate moment with him and turns to him for safety and comfort after, asking him to take her back home". This version is titled "Montmartre" on the soundtrack, named after the Parisian neighbourhood of the same name. Elements of the song also appear throughout the film's underscore.

== Reception ==
The song received generally positive reviews upon release. Broadway World described it as "an emotional ballad about holding onto life's precious moments". SunStar interpreted the piece as a sorrowful reflection of Maurice's feelings for his late wife. Hello called it "reflective and upbeat" and suggested it was worthy of an Academy Award for Best Original Song nomination. Us Weekly praised Dion's vocals and her delivery of the song's "spirited riffs and flawless octave changes". Hollywood Life described the track as moving and predicted it would have a strong emotional impact on audiences while NDTV Movies viewed it as "a subtle nod to the baggage that this production brings with it".

Rolling Stone noted that although the song does not reach the "cinematic peaks" of "My Heart Will Go On", Dion performs it with emotional weight and a restrained ending. In a more critical view, Metro compared the song unfavourably to "Beauty and the Beast", while Mashable argued that the "wistful" tune "fails to make much of an impression" despite its three iterations in the film.

== Celine Dion version ==
"How Does a Moment Last Forever"

Song by Celine Dion

from the album Beauty and the Beast
- Released: March 8, 2017
- Genre: Pop
- Length: 3:38
- Label: Walt Disney
- Composer: Alan Menken
- Lyricist: Tim Rice
- Producers: Alan Menken; Matt Sullivan; Michael Kosarin; Humberto Gatica

Music video
- "How Does a Moment Last Forever" on YouTube

Celine Dion had previously recorded the pop version of "Beauty and the Beast" with R&B artist Peabo Bryson, a release that helped establish her career in the English‑speaking market. For the 2017 live‑action adaptation, Menken invited her to record a new rendition of "How Does a Moment Last Forever", which plays over the end credits. Her version uses a mix of piano, accordion, and orchestral strings, and was recorded to a pre‑existing music track prepared by Menken during the scoring sessions.

=== Background ===
Dion initially hesitated to record the song following the death of her husband and manager René Angélil, who had played a central role in securing the 1991 duet. She later explained: "The first 'Beauty and the Beast' decision was made with my husband. Now I'm making decisions on my own. It's a little bit harder. I couldn't say yes right away, because I felt like I was kind of cheating in a way". She ultimately accepted, citing the importance of Beauty and the Beast in her early career: "I was at the beginning of my career, it put me on the map, it put me where I am today". Dion's vocal was produced by Humberto Gatica.

=== Accolades ===
On November 17, 2017, "How Does a Moment Last Forever" won a Hollywood Music in Media Award in the category Best Original Song in a Sci‑Fi, Fantasy or Horror Film. It was also nominated for Best Original Song in an Animated Film.

=== Commercial performance ===
Disney released Dion's version on its official YouTube channel on March 8, 2017, nine days before the film's premiere. Although not released as an official single due to Dion's unavailability for promotion, the song charted in several territories following the film's commercial success. It reached number one for two weeks in Quebec, number nine on the US Billboard Kid Digital Song Sales chart, number 80 in Scotland, number 94 on the UK Singles Downloads Chart, and number 125 in France, as well as number 124 on the French Digital Singles chart. It also reached number six on South Korea's International Download chart.

=== Music video ===
The music video for Dion's version was released on April 25, 2017, and consists of footage from the film accompanied by the song.

=== Charts ===
Chart performance
Chart (2017)	Peak position
France (SNEP)	125
Quebec Digital Song Sales (ADISQ)	1
Scottish Singles Sales (Official Charts)	80
South Korea International Download (Gaon)	6
UK Singles Downloads (Official Charts)	94
US Kid Digital Songs (Billboard)	9
