= Beauty and the Beast (2017 film) =

2017 film by Bill Condon

- Theatrical release poster
- Directed by: Bill Condon
- Screenplay by: Stephen Chbosky; Evan Spiliotopoulos
- Based on: Disney's Beauty and the Beast by Linda Woolverton
- Produced by: David Hoberman; Todd Lieberman
- Starring: Emma Watson; Dan Stevens; Luke Evans; Kevin Kline; Josh Gad; Ewan McGregor; Stanley Tucci; Audra McDonald; Gugu Mbatha-Raw; Ian McKellen; Emma Thompson
- Cinematography: Tobias Schliessler
- Edited by: Virginia Katz
- Music by: Alan Menken
- Production companies: Walt Disney Pictures; Mandeville Films
- Distributed by: Walt Disney Studios Motion Pictures
- Release dates: February 23, 2017 (Spencer House); March 2, 2017 (El Capitan Theatre); March 17, 2017 (United States)
- Running time: 129 minutes
- Country: United States
- Language: English
- Budget: $160–255 million
- Box office: $1.266 billion

Beauty and the Beast is a 2017 American musical romantic fantasy film and a live-action adaptation of Disney Animation's 1991 film, itself based on the French fairy tale. Directed by Bill Condon and written by Stephen Chbosky and Evan Spiliotopoulos, the film stars Emma Watson as Belle and Dan Stevens as the Beast, with Luke Evans, Kevin Kline, Josh Gad, Ewan McGregor, Stanley Tucci, Audra McDonald, Gugu Mbatha-Raw, Ian McKellen, and Emma Thompson in supporting roles.

The film was first announced in April 2014, with Condon attached to direct. The cast members signed on between January and April 2015, and filming took place primarily at Shepperton Studios in England from May to August of that year. The estimated production budget was around $255 million.

Beauty and the Beast had its world premiere at Spencer House in London on February 23, 2017, followed by its American premiere at the El Capitan Theatre in Hollywood on March 2. It was released theatrically in the United States on March 17. The film received generally positive reviews from critics, who praised its cast, songs, and visual detail. It grossed $1.27 billion, becoming the second-highest-grossing film of 2017 and the tenth-highest-grossing film of all time. Amongst Disney's live-action adaptation remakes, it is the second-highest-grossing film to date. The film received several accolades, including nominations for Best Production Design and Best Costume Design at the 90th Academy Awards.

== Plot ==
A selfish and unkind prince hosting a ball is visited in his castle by an enchantress disguised as an old beggar woman, who offers him an enchanted rose in exchange for shelter from a storm. When he rebuffs her, she reveals her true form and transforms him into a beast and his servants into household objects before erasing them from the memories of their loved ones. For the curse to be broken, the prince must learn to love someone and have that person love him back before the rose sheds its last petal, or else he will remain a beast forever.

Several years later in a nearby village, Belle, the bookworm daughter of widowed artist Maurice, dreams of adventure while constantly rejecting advances from Gaston, an arrogant hunter and war veteran. One day, Maurice becomes lost in the forest and — after escaping a pack of wolves — seeks refuge in the Beast's castle. The Beast imprisons him after he catches him stealing a rose from the garden for Belle. Belle travels to the castle and offers to take her father's place as prisoner; the Beast agrees.

Belle meets the castle's servants, including candelabra Lumière, mantel clock Cogsworth, feather-duster Plumette, teapot Mrs. Potts, and her son Chip, a teacup. When she finds the rose, the Beast angrily forces her to flee outside. Belle is ambushed by wolves and the Beast rescues her, getting injured in the process. As she nurses his wounds, they bond. He shows her a gift from the enchantress, a book that transports readers to their desired location. She and the Beast visit her childhood home in Paris, where they discover a plague doctor's mask and Belle realizes that when she was an infant, she forcibly departed with Maurice after her mother's death from the bubonic plague, the one thing Maurice could not bring himself to reveal.

Meanwhile, Maurice fails to convince the other villagers of the Beast. Gaston agrees to help, seeing rescuing Belle as the perfect opportunity to win her hand in marriage. When Maurice discovers his ulterior motive, Gaston abandons him to be devoured by wolves. Maurice is rescued by the town hermit Agathe, but Gaston convinces the village to send Maurice to an insane asylum. Belle discovers Maurice's predicament via a magic mirror, another gift from the enchantress. The Beast releases her to save him. Arriving back in town, she reveals the Beast via the mirror, shocking the townsfolk and proving her father's sanity. Realizing Belle has fallen for the Beast, Gaston jealously has her thrown into the asylum carriage with Maurice, then rallies the villagers to slay the Beast. Belle tells Maurice about her mother's death, and the two escape.

Gaston attacks the depressed Beast, who regains his spirit upon seeing Belle return. He spares Gaston's life, but Gaston shoots the Beast twice from an unstable bridge; its collapse sends Gaston falling to his death. The Beast dies just as the last petal falls, and the servants become inanimate. As Belle tearfully professes her love to him, Agathe reveals herself as the enchantress and undoes the curse, restoring the Beast and his servants to their human forms along with the villagers' memories, as well as restoring the castle to its true appearance. Belle and the prince host a ball for the kingdom.

== Cast ==
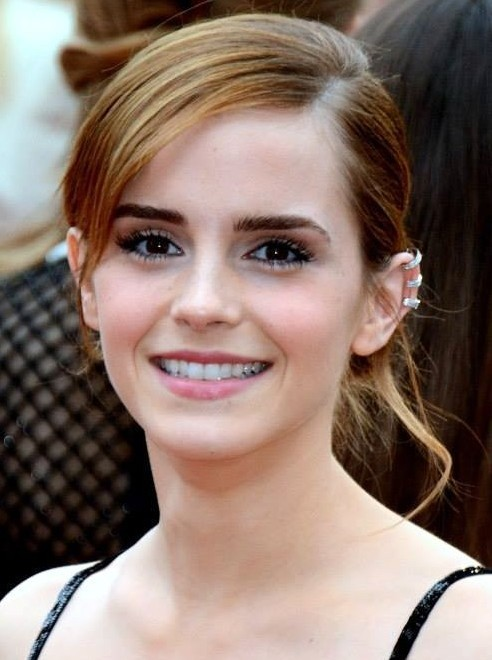
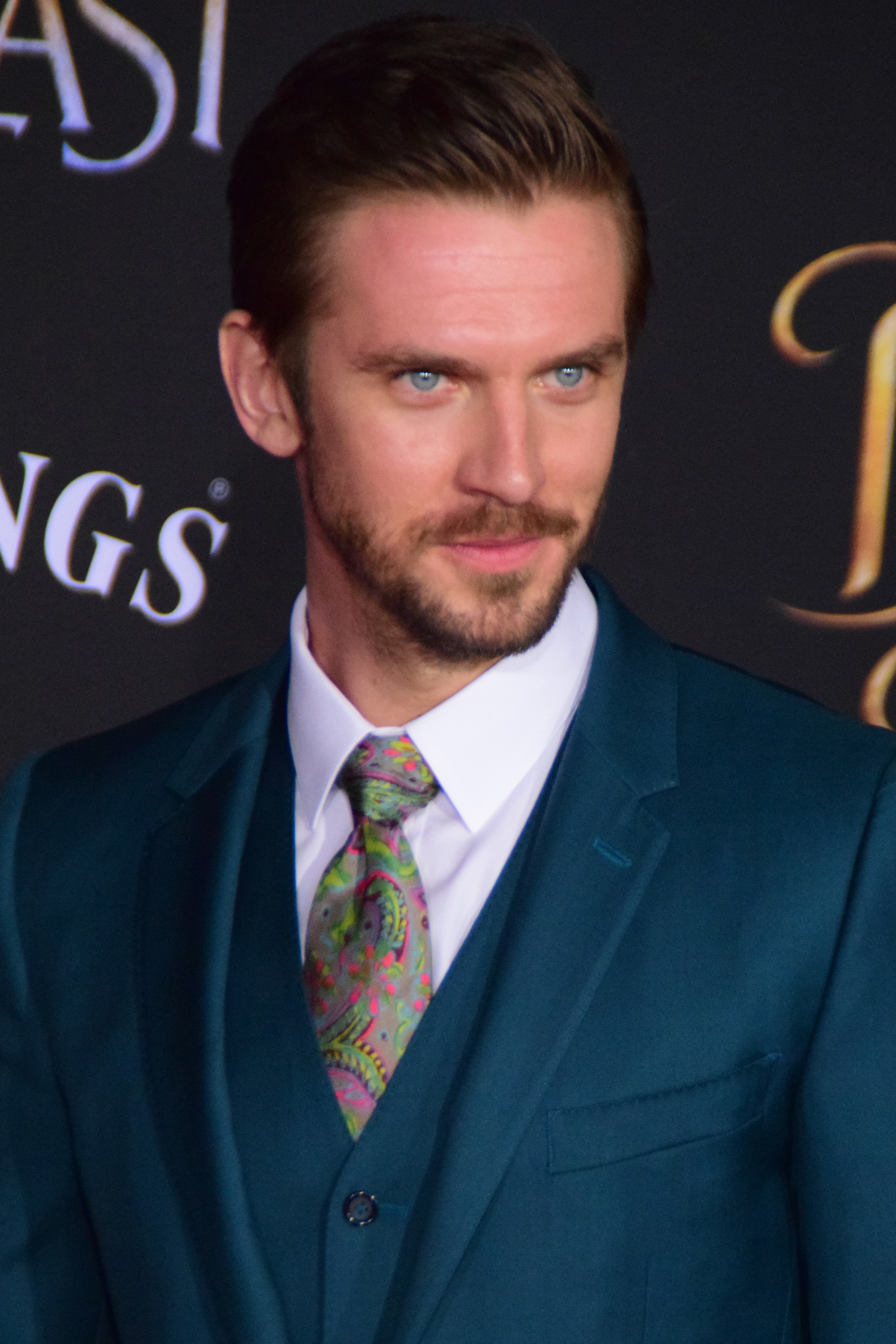
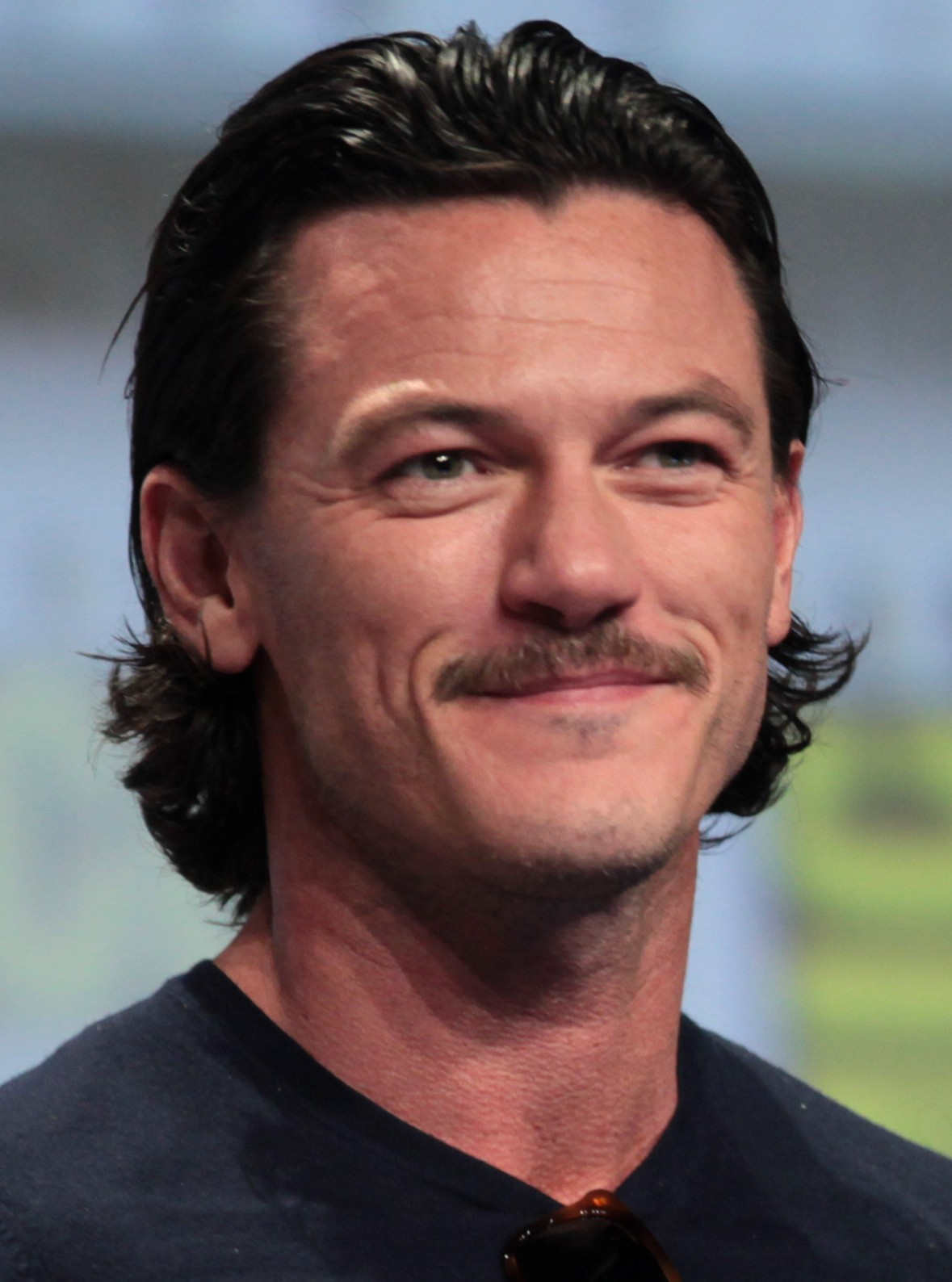
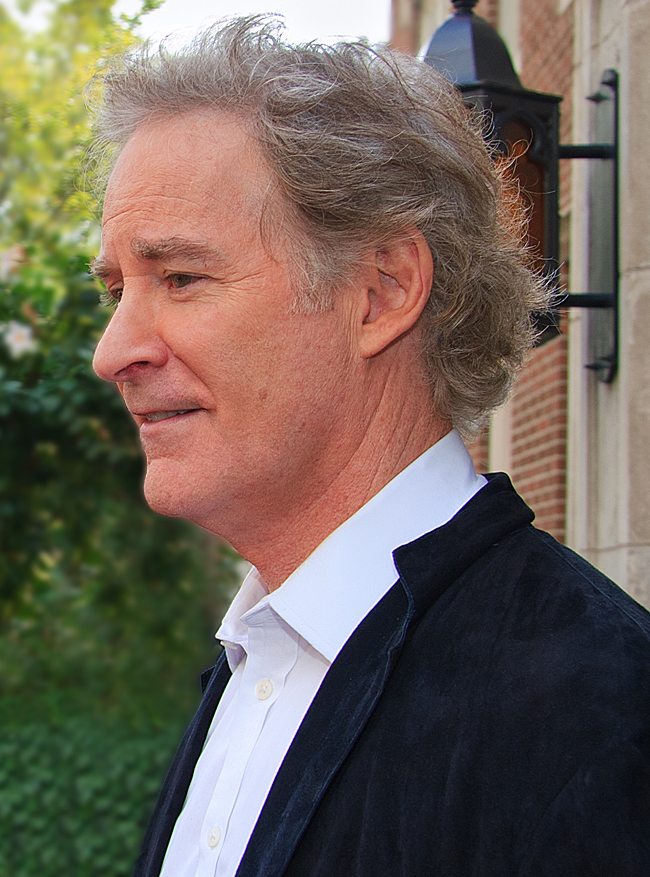
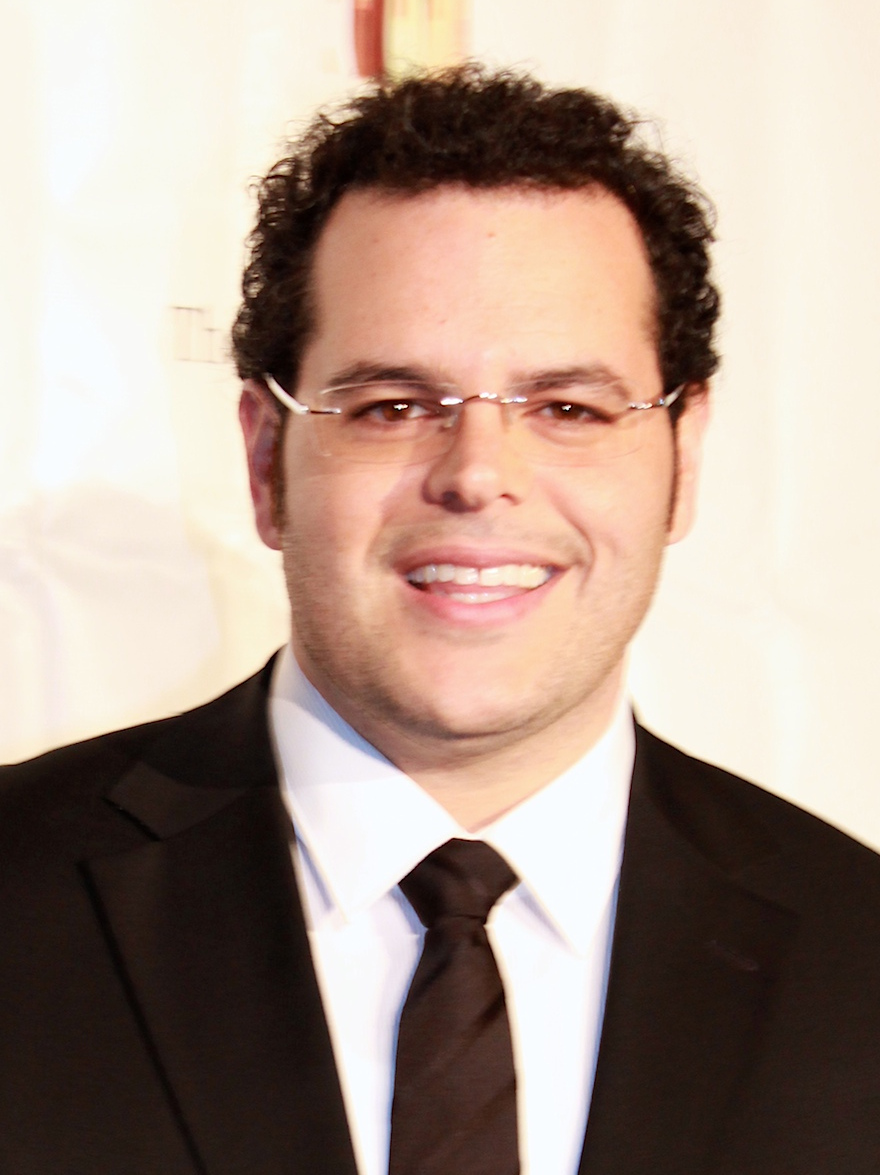
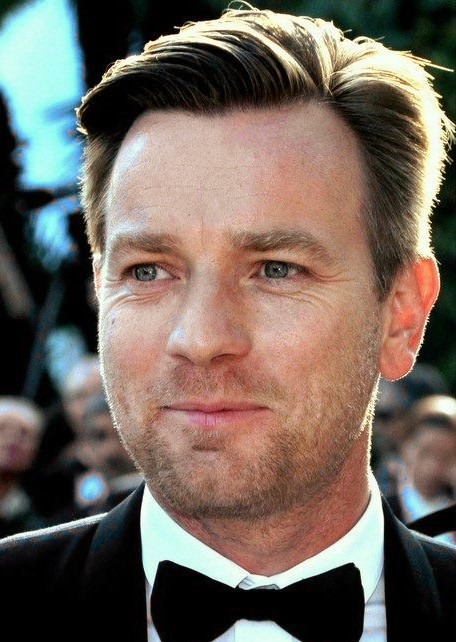
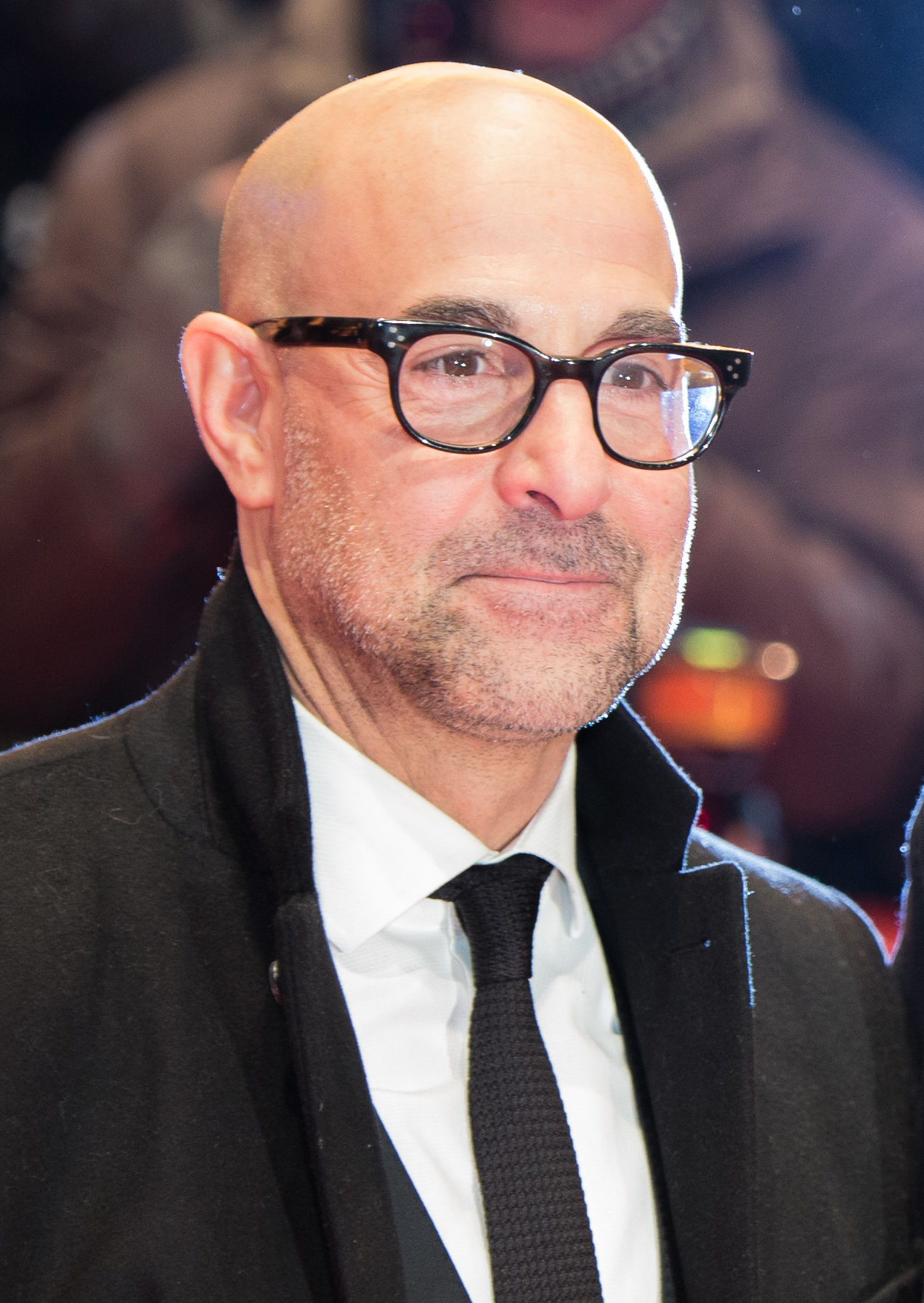
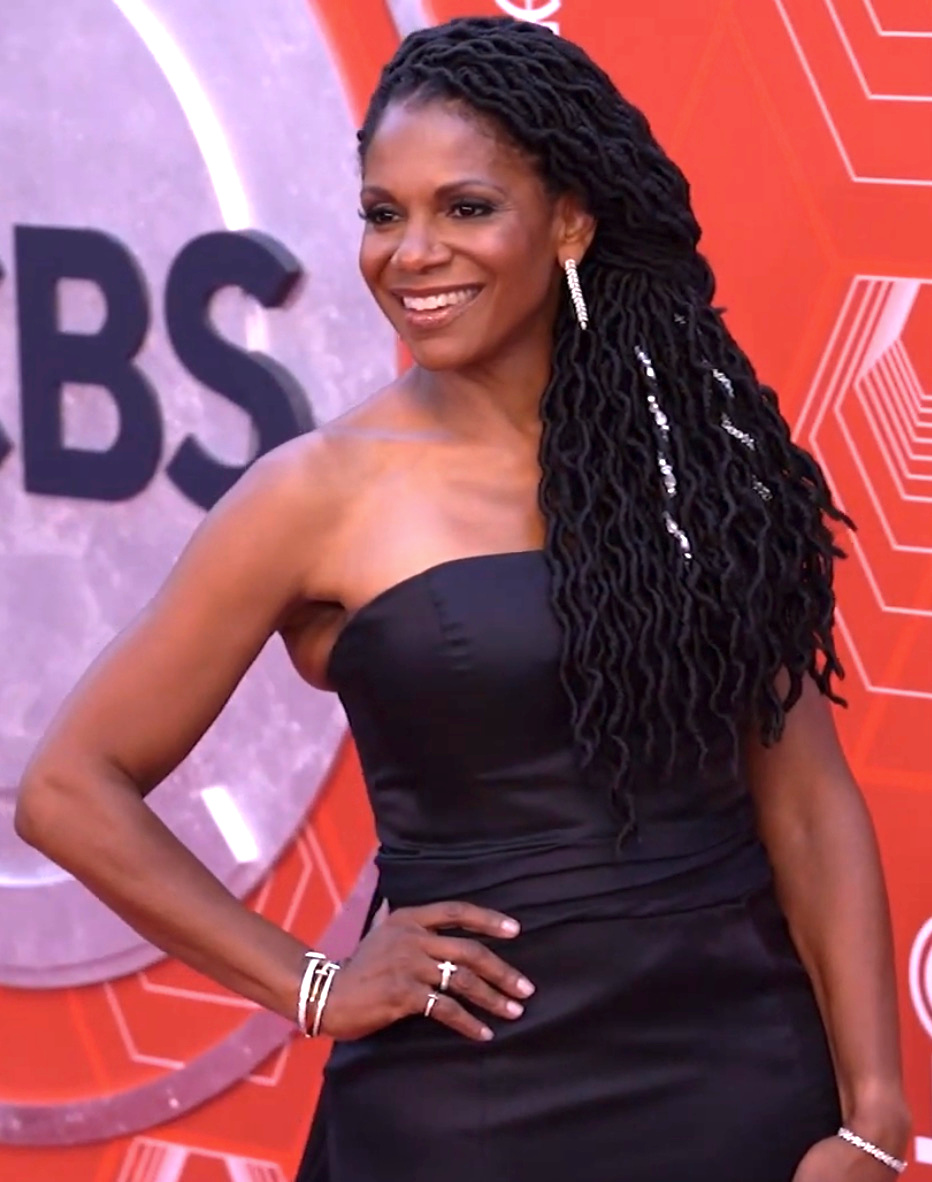
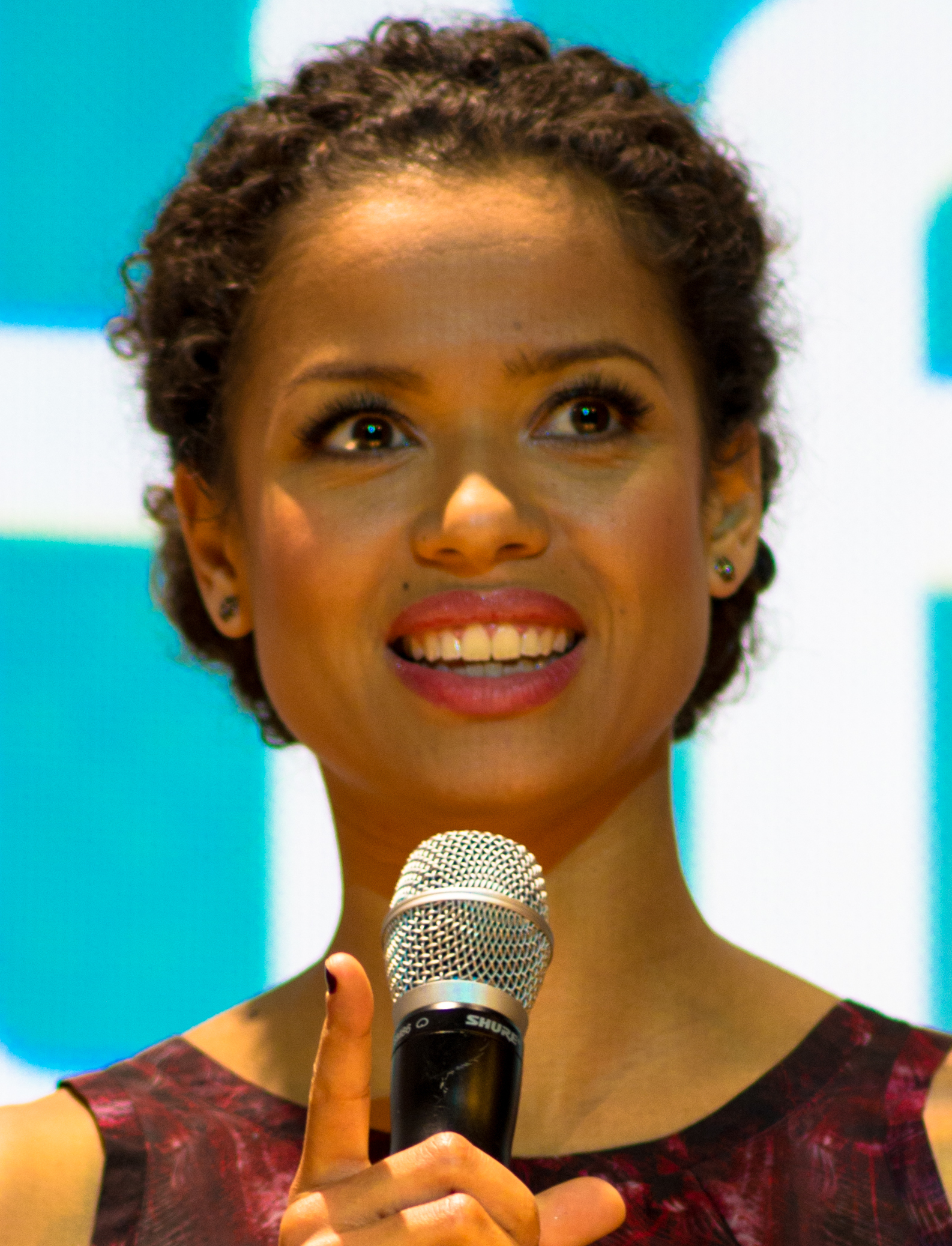
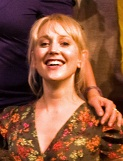
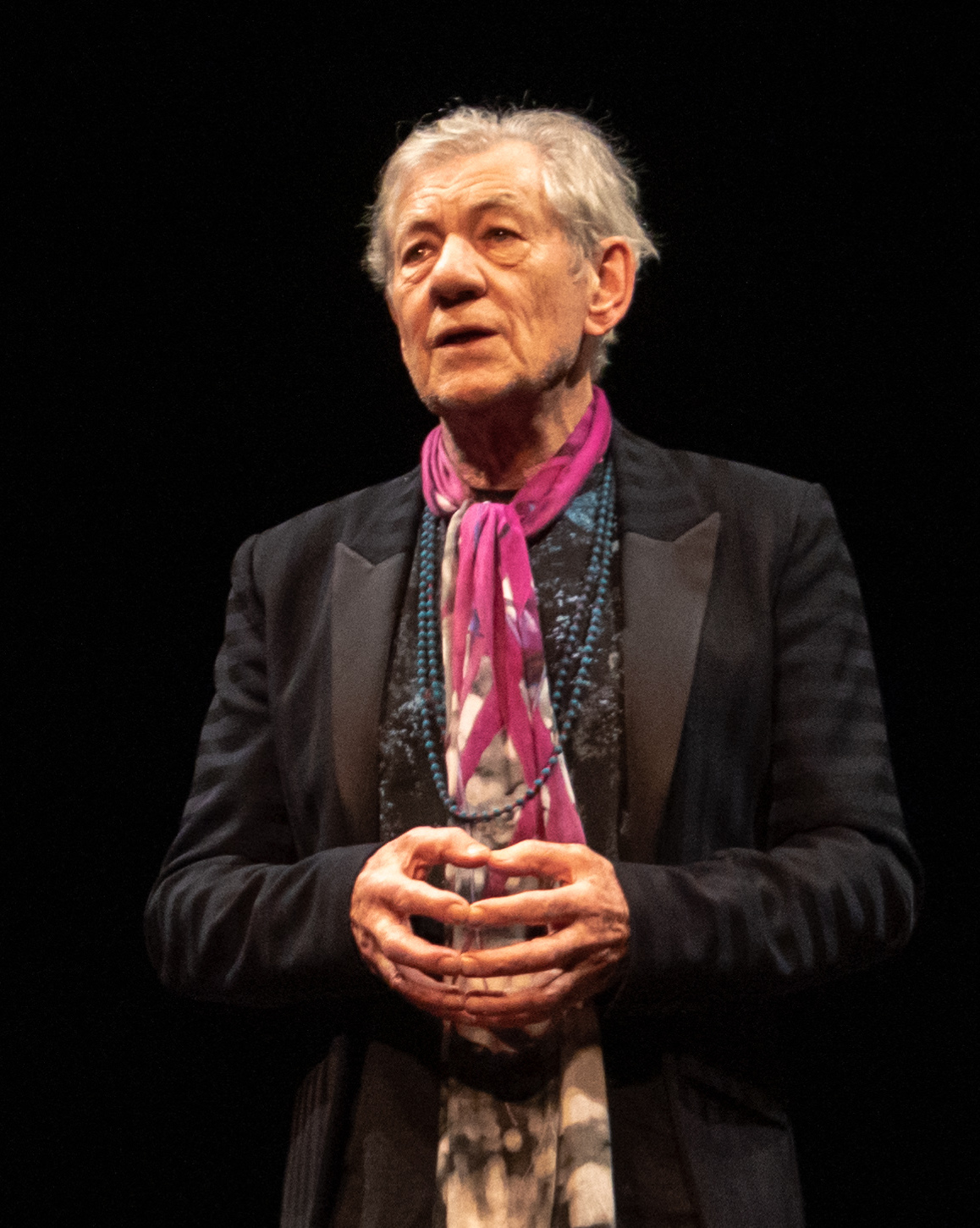
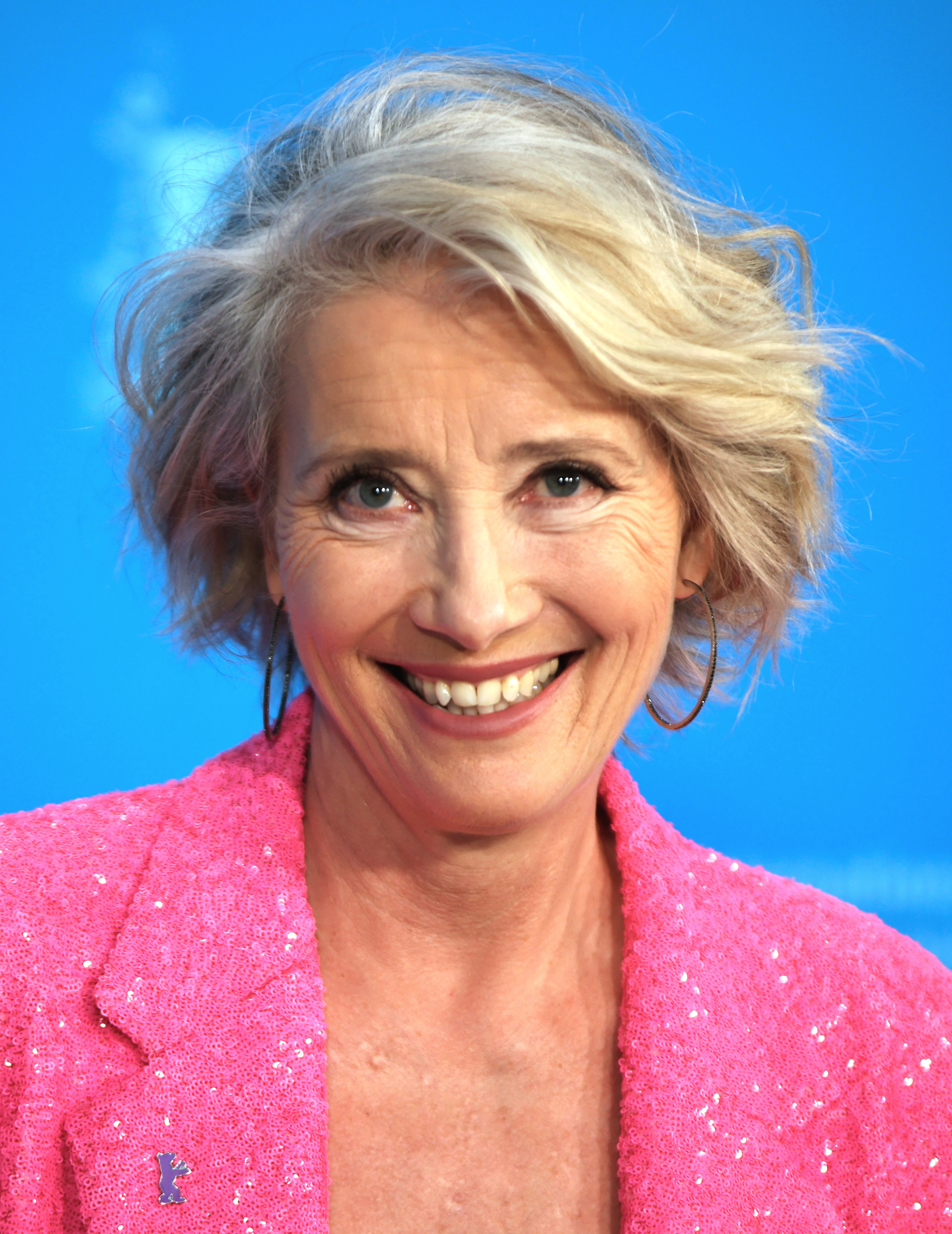
Top row: Emma Watson, Dan Stevens, Luke Evans and Kevin Kline play Belle, Beast, Gaston and Maurice.
Middle row: Josh Gad, Ewan McGregor, Stanley Tucci, Audra McDonald play LeFou, Lumière, Cadenza and Madame de Garderobe
Bottom row: Gugu Mbatha-Raw, Hattie Morahan, Ian McKellen, and Emma Thompson play Plumette, Agathe, Cogsworth, and Mrs. Potts.
- Emma Watson as Belle, a bright and spirited bibliophile who rejects the monotony of provincial life and yearns for life beyond the confines of her village.
  - Daisy Duczmal as Baby Belle.
- Dan Stevens as the Beast, a spoiled and arrogant prince who has been transformed into a monstrous, talking beast and forced to earn back his humanity by learning to truly love and be loved in return. Stevens portrays the character through motion-capture.
  - Adam Mitchell as Young Prince. (Note: In the initial theatrical release, Mitchell was miscredited as Rudi Goodman in the cast, but listed under his real name in the soundtrack credits.)
- Luke Evans as Gaston, a narcissistic and arrogant hunter and veteran of the French Royal Army who seeks to have Belle as his trophy wife.
- Kevin Kline as Maurice, Belle's protective widowed father who works as a music box maker and an artist.
  - Jolyon Coy as Young Maurice.
- Josh Gad as LeFou, Gaston's flamboyant, illiterate, animal-loving, and long-suffering sidekick who bolsters his friend's ego but often disagrees with his decisions.
- Ewan McGregor as Lumière, the Beast's charismatic maître d' who has been transformed into a candelabra.
- Stanley Tucci as Cadenza, a neurotic composer (who is described as "a neurotic maestro") and Madame de Garderobe's husband who has been transformed into a harpsichord.
- Audra McDonald as Madame de Garderobe, a world-renowned opera singer and Cadenza's wife who has been transformed into a wardrobe.
- Gugu Mbatha-Raw as Plumette, a castle maid and Lumière's lover who has been transformed into a feather duster.
- Hattie Morahan as Agathe, an enchantress responsible for cursing the Prince, and who lives incognito in Belle's village as a "hag". Morahan also narrates the prologue.
  - Rita Davies as Old Woman, the enchantress's beggar disguise. The film was released posthumously after Davies's death.
- Nathan Mack as Chip, Mrs Potts's plucky son who has been transformed into a teacup.
- Ian McKellen as Cogsworth, the Beast's strict but loyal butler and the head of the household staff who has been transformed into a mantel clock.
- Emma Thompson as Mrs Potts, the castle's motherly head housekeeper who has been transformed into a teapot.

The film also features Thomas Padden as Chapeau, the prince's valet who has been transformed into a coat rack, and Clive Rowe as Cuisinier, the castle's head chef who has been transformed into a stove. Additionally, Sophie Reid, Rafaëlle Cohen, and Carla Nella appear as the Village Lasses, a trio of women who fawn over Gaston and are jealous of Belle. Jimmy Johnston, Dean Street, and Alexis Loizon appear as Tom, Dick, and Stanley, a trio of men who are friends with Gaston and LeFou and serve as the former's henchmen. Adrian Schiller appears as Monsieur D'Arque, the sly warden of the local asylum who is bribed by Gaston to have Maurice institutionalized. Gerard Horan appears as Monsieur Jean Potts, Mrs Potts's husband and Chip's father. Haydn Gwynne appears as Clothilde, a fishmonger and Cogsworth's wife. Michael Jibson appears as the Tavern Keeper, the owner and keeper of Villeneuve's local tavern. Ray Fearon appears as Père Robert, Villeneuve's local chaplain who encourages Belle to borrow the books in the chapel's meager library. Zoë Rainey appears as Belle's mother, Maurice's late wife who contracted the plague and died when Belle was an infant. Gizmo appears as Frou-Frou, Maestro Cadenza's and Madame de Garderobe's pet Yorkshire Terrier who has been transformed into a footstool. Tom Turner (Note: In the initial theatrical release, Turner is miscredited as Henry Garrett in the cast.) appears as the King, the prince's father who, following his wife's death, raised his son to be just as arrogant and selfish as he was. Harriet Jones appears as the Queen, the Prince's mother who died of an illness when he was a child. Dale Branston appears as Villeneuve's resident baker. Chris Andrew Mellon appears as Nasty Headmaster, the unnamed headmaster of an all-boys school in Villeneuve that disapproves of Belle teaching a young girl how to read. Vivian Parry appears as the Village Lasses' mother, an unnamed seamstress. Stephen Merchant was set to appear as Monsieur Toilette, a servant who was turned into a toilet, but his scenes were wiped from the theatrical release of the film.

== Production ==
=== Development ===
Previously, Disney had begun work on a film adaptation of the 1994 Broadway musical. However, in a 2011 interview, composer Alan Menken stated the planned film version of the Beauty and the Beast stage musical "was canned".

By April 2014, Walt Disney Pictures had already begun developing a new live-action version of Beauty and the Beast after making other live-action fantasy films such as Alice in Wonderland, Maleficent, Cinderella, and The Jungle Book. Two months later, Bill Condon signed on to direct the film from a script by Evan Spiliotopoulos. Later in September of that same year, Stephen Chbosky (who directed Emma Watson in The Perks of Being a Wallflower) was hired to re-write the script.

Before Condon was hired to direct the film, Disney approached him with a proposal to remake the film in a more radical way as Universal Studios had remade Snow White and the Huntsman (2012). Condon later explained that "after Frozen opened, the studio saw that there was this big international audience for an old-school-musical approach. But initially, they said, 'We're interested in a musical to a degree, but only half full of songs.' My interest was taking that film and doing it in this new medium—live-action—as a full-on musical movie. So I backed out for a minute, and they came back and said, 'No, no, no, we get it, let's pursue it that way.'" Walt Disney Pictures President of Production Sean Bailey credited Walt Disney Studios chairman Alan F. Horn with the decision to make the film as a musical: "We worked on this for five or six years, and for 18 months to two years, Beauty was a serious dramatic project, and the scripts were written to reflect that. It wasn't a musical at that time. But we just couldn't get it to click and it was Alan Horn who championed the idea of owning the Disney of it all. We realized there was a competitive advantage in the songs. What is wrong with making adults feel like kids again?" The film's ending originally featured Gaston being cursed by the Enchantress, though the idea was scrapped.

=== Casting ===
In January 2015, it was announced that Emma Watson had been cast as Belle, the female lead. She was the first and only choice of Walt Disney Studios chairman Alan F. Horn, who had previously run Warner Bros. which released the eight Harry Potter films that starred Watson as Hermione Granger. Watson had previously been attached to star in Guillermo del Toro's film adaptation of the original fairy tale for Warner Bros., but the project never materialized. Susan Egan, who originated the role of Belle in the 1994 Broadway musical, commented on the casting of Watson as "perfect", while Paige O'Hara, who voiced Belle in the original 1991 animated film, said, "I think that if I were producing that movie, Emma Watson would've been my first choice for Belle. I was just really happy they went with Emma. She's got the intelligence, she's got the humor. I think she's going to be really, really special." Watson was paid $3 million upfront, with an agreement that her final take-home pay could rise as high as $15 million if the film generated gross box office income similar to the $758 million worldwide gross of Maleficent.

Two months later, Luke Evans and Dan Stevens were reported to be in talks to play Gaston and the Beast respectively, and Watson confirmed their casting the next day on Twitter. Idris Elba also auditioned for the role of Gaston. The rest of the principal cast, including Josh Gad, Emma Thompson, Kevin Kline, Audra McDonald, Ian McKellen, Gugu Mbatha-Raw, Ewan McGregor, and Stanley Tucci were announced between March and April to play LeFou, Mrs. Potts, Maurice, Madame de Garderobe, Cogsworth, Plumette, Lumière, and Cadenza, respectively.

=== Filming ===
Principal photography began on May 18, 2015, taking place at Shepperton Studios in Surrey, England, nearby in the village of Cranleigh, and in Lacock, Wiltshire.The massive movie set of the fictional provincial town of Villeneuve (named after the author of the original fairy tale, Gabrielle-Suzanne Barbot de Villeneuve) was inspired by the town of Conques in southern France and measured 28,787 square feet (2,670 m^{2}). The director, Bill Condon, referred to the prestigious International Debutante Ball at the Waldorf-Astoria Hotel in New York City as inspiration for the grand ball scene.

Filming with the principal actors concluded on August 21. Six days later, co-producer Jack Morrissey confirmed that production had officially wrapped. The castle in the film was inspired by the Château de Chambord in France.

The Beast was portrayed with a "more traditional motion capture puppeteering for the body and the physical orientation", where actor Dan Stevens was "in a forty-pound gray suit on stilts for much of the film". The facial capture for the Beast was done separately in order to "communicate the subtleties of the human face" and "[capture the] thought that occurs to him" which gets "through [to] the eyes, which are the last human element in the Beast." The castle servants who are transformed into household objects were created with CGI animation.

One concern was that one wrong step could lead to one of Stevens's steel stilts crushing one of Watson's feet, which could have severely disrupted production. To minimize that risk, the actors spent three months in pre-production and rigorously rehearsed their scenes. For the film's iconic dance scene, they initially practiced waltz steps on the ground, then Stevens learned how to walk on stilts, and then he learned how to waltz on stilts.

Prior to the film's release, Bill Condon refilmed one certain sequence in the "Days in the Sun" number, due to confusion among test audiences caused by actress Harriet Jones, who looked similar to Hattie Morahan, who portrayed Agathe. In the original version of the scene, it was Jones' character, the Prince's mother, who sings the first verse of the song, with Rudi Goodman playing the young Prince and Henry Garrett playing his father; but in the reshot version of the scene, the singing part is given to the Prince (now played by Adam Mitchell). The King was also recast to Tom Turner, although Harriet Jones was still the Queen, albeit with dark hair. Both Goodman and Garrett's names were mistakenly featured in the original theatrical release's credits, but was later corrected in home releases.

== Music ==
When released in 1991, Beauty and the Beast marked a turning point for Walt Disney Pictures by appealing to millions of fans with its Academy Award-winning musical score by lyricist Howard Ashman and composer Alan Menken. In Bill Condon's opinion, that original score was the key reason he agreed to direct a live-action version of the film. "That score had more to reveal", he says, "You look at the songs and there's not a clunker in the group. In fact, Frank Rich described it as the best Broadway musical of 1991. The animated version was already darker and more modern than the previous Disney fairy-tales. Take that vision, put it into a new medium, make it a radical reinvention, something not just for the stage because it's not just being literal, now other elements come into play. It's not just having real actors do it."

Condon initially prepared on only drawing inspiration from the original film, but he also planned to include most of the songs composed by Menken, Ashman and Tim Rice from the Broadway musical, with the intention of making the film as a "straight-forward, live-action, large-budget movie musical". Menken returned to score the film's music, which features songs from the original film by him and Ashman, plus new material written by him and Rice. Menken said the film would not include songs that were written for the Broadway musical and, instead, created four new songs. However, an instrumental version of the song "Home", which was written for the musical, is used during the scene where Belle first enters her room in the castle.

On January 19, 2017, both Disney and Celine Dion — singer of the original 1991 "Beauty and the Beast" duet song, with singer Peabo Bryson — confirmed that Dion would be performing one of the new original songs "How Does a Moment Last Forever" to play over the end titles. She originally had doubts about whether or not to record the song due to the recent death of her husband and manager René Angélil, who had previously helped her secure the 1991 pop duet. While ultimately accepting the opportunity, she said: "[The] first Beauty and the Beast decision was made with my husband. Now I'm making decisions on my own. It's a little bit harder. I couldn't say yes right away, because I felt like I was kind of cheating in a way." She eventually felt compelled to record the song because of the impact Beauty and the Beast has had on her career. According to Dion, "I was at the beginning of my career, it put me on the map, it put me where I am today." Also, Josh Groban was announced to be performing the new original song "Evermore" six days later.

The 2017 film features a remake of the 1991 original song recorded as a duet by Ariana Grande and John Legend. Grande and Legend's updated version of the title song is faithful to the original, Grammy-winning duet, performed by Celine Dion and Peabo Bryson for the 1991 Disney film. Disney debuted the music video for Ariana Grande and John Legend's interpretation of the title song on Freeform television network on March 5, 2017, and it has since been viewed over 250 million times on the Vevo video-hosting service.

Emma Thompson also performed the title song, which was performed by Angela Lansbury in the original 1991 animated film.

== Marketing ==
Disney spent around $140 million to market the film worldwide. Disney premiered the first official teaser trailer on Good Morning America in May 2016. In its first 24 hours, the teaser trailer reached 91.8 million views, which was the largest number ever seen for a trailer in that amount of time. This record has since been broken by Thor: Ragnarok, It, and Avengers: Infinity War. The first official teaser poster was released on July 7, 2016. On November 2, 2016, Entertainment Weekly debuted the first official image on the cover of their magazine, along with nine new photos. One week later, Emma Watson and Disney debuted a new poster. On November 14, 2016, the first theatrical trailer was released, again on Good Morning America. This reached 127.6 million views in its first 24 hours, setting a new record for the most views in one day, beating Fifty Shades Darker; this record has since been broken by The Fate of the Furious. A TV spot with Watson singing was shown during the 74th Golden Globe Awards. Disney released the final trailer on January 30, 2017.

=== Novelization ===
A tie-in novelization of the film was published by Disney Publishing Worldwide on January 31, 2017.

== Release ==
=== Theatrical ===
The world premiere of Beauty and the Beast took place as a Spencer House Royal World Charity Event in London on February 23, 2017. The US premiere was held at the El Capitan Theatre in Hollywood on March 2, 2017. The stream was broadcast on YouTube.

A sing-along version of the film released in over 1,200 US theaters nationwide on April 7, 2017. The United Kingdom received the same version on April 21, 2017.

The film was re-released in New York City and Los Angeles for a one-week engagement starting December 1, 2017. The movie was an awards push as the 2017–18 awards season heated up.

On March 16, 2015, Disney announced the film would be released in 3D on March 17, 2017. The first official presentation of the film took place at Disney's three-day D23 Expo in August 2015.

On February 10, 2017, IMAX announced that the film would have an expanded aspect ratio of 1.90:1, revealing 26% more picture, only in IMAX theatres.

=== Home media ===
Beauty and the Beast was released on Blu-ray, DVD, Blu-ray 3D and Digital HD on June 6, 2017. The film debuted at No. 1 on the NPD VideoScan overall disc sales chart, with all other titles in the top 20, collectively, selling only 40% as many units as Beauty and the Beast. The film regained the top spot on the national home video sales charts during its third week of release. Overall, the film made a revenue of $85.1 million from home video sales with 4.3 million units sold, making it the second best-selling film of 2017 behind Moana. Beauty and the Beast was released on 4K Blu-ray and on Digital Movie Copy 4K ULTRA HD Streamable Version Downloadable Format on March 10, 2020, concurrently along with the original animated feature film.

== Reception ==
=== Box office ===
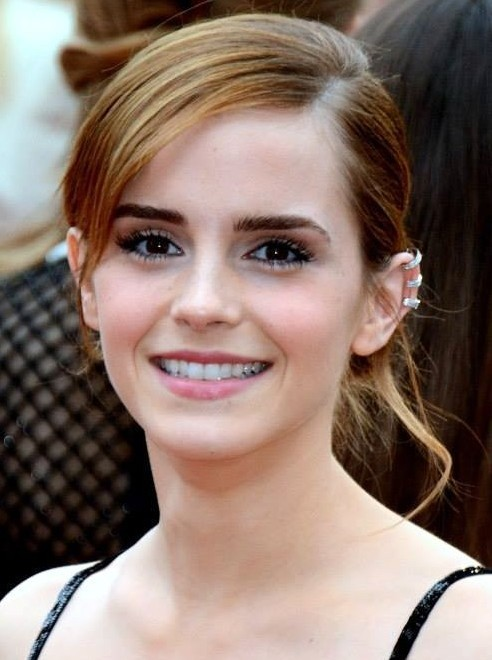
Beauty and the Beast is Emma Watson's highest-grossing film in the domestic side and second-highest-grossing film overall, behind only Harry Potter and the Deathly Hallows – Part 2.

Beauty and the Beast grossed $504 million in the United States and Canada and $759.5 million in other countries for a worldwide gross of $1.263 billion. With a production budget of $254 million, it is the most expensive musical ever made. In just ten days, it became the highest-grossing live-action musical of all time, beating the nine-year-old record held by Mamma Mia!. It also became the second-biggest musical ever overall at the time, behind Disney's Frozen (2013). Worldwide, the film proved to be a global phenomenon, earning a total of $357 million over its four-day opening weekend from 56 markets. Critics said the film was playing like superhero movies amongst women. It was the second-biggest March global opening, behind only Batman v Superman: Dawn of Justice, the thirteenth-biggest worldwide opening ever and the seventh-biggest for Disney. This includes $21 million from IMAX plays on 1,026 screens, a new record for an IMAX PG title. It surpassed the entire lifetime total of the original film in just six days.

Beauty and the Beast was the 300th digitally remastered release in IMAX company's history, which began with the re-release of Apollo 13 in 2002. Its robust global debut helped push the company past $6 billion for the first time, and led to analysts believing that the film had a shot of passing $1 billion worldwide from theatrical earnings. On April 12, it passed the $1 billion threshold, becoming the first film of 2017, the fourteenth Disney film, and the twenty-ninth film overall to pass the mark. It became the first film since Rogue One: A Star Wars Story (also a Disney property) in December 2016 to make over a billion dollars, and did so on its 29th day of release. It is currently the second-highest-grossing film of 2017 (behind Star Wars: The Last Jedi), the highest-grossing March release, the highest-grossing remake of all time, and the sixth-biggest Disney film. Even after inflation adjusted, it is still ahead of the $425 million gross ($760 million in 2017 dollars) of the original film. Deadline Hollywood calculated the film's net profit as $414.7 million, accounting for production budgets, marketing, talent participations, and other costs; box office grosses and home media revenues placed it second on their list of 2017's "Most Valuable Blockbusters".

==== United States and Canada ====
In the United States and Canada, Beauty and the Beast topped Fandango's pre-sales and became the fastest-selling family film in the company's history, topping the studio's own animated film Finding Dory released the previous year. Early tracking had the film grossing around $100 million in its opening weekend, with some publications predicting it could reach $130 million. By the time the film's release was 10 days away, analysts raised projections to as high as $150 million. It earned $16.3 million from Thursday previews night, marking the biggest of 2017 (breaking Logan's record), the biggest ever for a Disney live-action film (breaking Maleficent's record), the second-biggest ever for both a G- or PG-rated film (behind the sixth Harry Potter film Harry Potter and the Half-Blood Prince) and the third-biggest ever in the month of March (behind Batman v Superman: Dawn of Justice and The Hunger Games). An estimated 41% of the gross came from IMAX, 3D and premium large format screenings which began at 6 pm, while the rest—59%—came from regular 2D shows which began at 7 pm. The numbers were considered more impressive given that the film played during a school week.

On its opening day, the film made $63.8 million from 4,210 theaters across 9,200 screens, marking the third biggest in the month of March, trailing behind Batman v Superman ($81.5 million) and The Hunger Games ($67 million). It was also the biggest opening day ever for a film that wasn't PG-13, displacing the $58 million opening Wednesday of Harry Potter and the Half-Blood Prince. Its opening day alone (which includes Thursday's previews) almost matched the entire opening weekend of previous Disney live-action films, Maleficent ($69.4 million) and Cinderella ($67.9 million). Unlike all previous four Disney live-action films witnessing a hike on their second day, Saturday, Beauty and the Beast actually fell 2%, nevertheless, the dip was paltry, and the grosses are so much greater in comparison to the other titles. Earning a total of $174.8 million on its opening weekend, it defied all expectations and went on to set numerous notable records. This includes the biggest opening of the year as well as the biggest for the month of March and pre-summer/spring opening, beating Batman v Superman, the biggest start ever for a PG title (also for a family film), surpassing Finding Dory until it was later surpassed by Incredibles 2, the biggest debut of all time for a female-led film, ahead of The Hunger Games: Catching Fire, the biggest for a Disney live-action adaptation, ahead of Alice in Wonderland and the biggest live-action musical and musical debuts ever, supplanting Pitch Perfect 2 and The Lorax, respectively. Furthermore, it is also Watson's highest-opening, beating Harry Potter and the Deathly Hallows – Part 2 same with Emma Thompson, director Bill Condon's biggest debut ever ahead of The Twilight Saga: Breaking Dawn – Part 2 and the biggest outside of summer, save for Star Wars: The Force Awakens, not accounting for inflation.

It became the forty-third film to debut with over $100 million and the fifteenth film to open above $150 million. Its three-day opening alone surpassed the entire original North American run of the first film ($146 million; before the 3D re-release), instantly becoming the second-biggest film of the year, behind Logan ($184 million), and the second-highest-grossing musical, behind Grease's $188 million cumulative gross in 1978. Out of the total ticket sales, 70% came from 2D showings thus signifying that people who don't go to theaters frequently came out in bulk to watch the film. About 26% of the remaining tickets were for 3D. IMAX accounted for 7% ($12.5 million) of the total weekend's gross, setting a new record for a PG title, ahead of Alice in Wonderland ($12.1 million) while PLF repped 11% of the box office. The film's opening day demographic, around 70% were female, dropping to 60% through the weekend. According polling service PostTrak, about 84% of American parents who saw the film on its opening day said they would "definitely" recommend it for families. The film's opening was credited to positive word of mouth from audiences, good reviews from critics, effective marketing which sold the title not just as a family film but also as a romantic drama, the cast's star power (namely Emma Watson), lack of competition, being the first family film since The Lego Batman Movie a month earlier, nostalgia, and the success and ubiquity of the first film and Disney's brand.

On Monday, its fourth day of release, the film fell precipitously by 72% earning $13.5 million. The steep fall was due to a limited marketplace where only 11% K-12 and 15% colleges were off per ComScore. Nevertheless, it is the second-biggest March Monday, behind Batman v Superman ($15 million). This was followed by the biggest March and pre-summer Tuesday with $17.8 million, a 32% increase from its previous day. The same day, the film passed $200 million in ticket sales. It earned $228.6 million in the first week of release, the sixth-biggest seven-day gross of all time. In its second weekend, the film continued to maintain the top positioning and fell gradually by 48% earning another $90.4 million to register the fourth-biggest second weekend of all time, and the third-biggest for Disney. In terms of percentage drop, its 48% decline is the third-smallest drop for any film opening above $125 million (behind Finding Dory and The Force Awakens). The hold was notable considering how the film was able to fend off three new wide releases: Power Rangers, Life, CHiPs, and Wilson. As a result, it passed the $300 million threshold becoming the first film of 2017 the pass said mark. The film grossed $45.4 million in its third weekend, finally being overtaken for the top spot by newcomer The Boss Baby ($50.2 million). On April 4, 2017, its nineteenth day of release, it passed the $400 million threshold becoming the first film of 2017 to do so. By its fourth weekend, the film was playing in 3,969 cinemas, a fall of 241 theaters from its previous weekend. Of those, approximately 1,200 cinemas were sing-along versions. It earned $26.3 million (−48%) and retained second place. By comparison, previous Disney films Moana (−8%) and Frozen (−2%) both witnessed mild percentage declines the weekend their sing-alone versions were released. In its seventh week, The Circle, also starring Emma Watson, was released and debuted at number four; Beauty and the Beast placed number six.

By May 28, the film had earned over $500 million in ticket sales becoming the first film of 2017 (until it was later surpassed by The Last Jedi), the third female-led film (after The Force Awakens and Rogue One followed by Wonder Woman and The Last Jedi) and the eighth overall film in cinematic history to pass the mark. It has already become the biggest March release, dethroning The Hunger Games (2012), the biggest musical film (both animated and live-action), as well as the second biggest film of 2017 after The Last Jedi. In July 2020, due to the ongoing COVID-19 pandemic closing most theaters and limiting new releases, Beauty and the Beast returned to 527 theaters (mostly drive-ins) and grossed $467,000.

==== Other territories ====
Outside the US and Canada, the film began playing on Thursday, March 16, 2017. Through Sunday, March 19, it had a total international opening of $182.3 million from 55 markets, 44 of which were major territories, far exceeding initial estimations of $100 million and opened at No. 1 in virtually all markets except Vietnam, Turkey, and India. Its launch is the second-biggest for the month of March, behind Batman v Superman ($256.5 million). In IMAX, it recorded the biggest debut for a PG-rated title (although it carried varying certificate amongst different markets) with $8.5 million from 649 screens, the second-biggest for a PG title behind The Jungle Book. In its second weekend, it fell just by 35% earning another $120.6 million and maintaining its first position hold. It added major markets like France and Australia. It topped the international box office for three consecutive weekends before finally being dethroned by Ghost in the Shell and The Boss Baby in its fourth weekend. Despite the fall, the film helped Disney push past the $1 billion threshold internationally for the first time in 2017.

It scored the biggest opening day of the year in Hong Kong and the Philippines, the biggest March Thursday in Italy ($1 million, also the biggest Disney Thursday debut), the biggest March opening day in Austria, and the second-biggest in Germany ($1.1 million), Disney's biggest March in Denmark, the biggest Disney live-action debut in China ($12.6 million), the UK ($6.2 million), Mexico ($2.4 million) and Brazil ($1.8 million) and the third-biggest in South Korea with $1.2 million, behind only Pirates of the Caribbean: At World's End and Pirates of the Caribbean: On Stranger Tides. In terms of opening weekend, the largest debut came from China ($44.8 million), followed by the UK ($24.3 million), Korea ($11.8 million), Mexico ($11.8 million), Australia ($11.1 million), Brazil ($11 million), Germany ($10.7 million), France ($8.4 million), Italy ($7.6 million), Philippines ($6.3 million), Russia ($6 million), and Spain ($5.8 million).

In the United Kingdom and Ireland, the film recorded the biggest opening ever for a PG-rated film, the biggest Disney live-action opening of all time, the biggest March opening weekend, the biggest opening for a musical (ahead of 2012's Les Misérables), the number one opening of 2017 to date and the fifth-biggest-ever overall with £19.7 million ($24.5 million) from 639 theatres and almost twice that of The Jungle Book (£9.9 million). This included the second-biggest Saturday ever (£7.9 million), only behind Star Wars: The Force Awakens. It witnessed a decline in its second weekend, earning £12.33 million ($15.4 million). Though the film was falling at a faster rate than The Jungle Book, it had already surpassed the said film and its second weekend is the third-biggest ever (behind the two James Bond films Skyfall (2012) and Spectre).

In India, the film managed to take an occupancy of 15% on its opening day. It earned around ₹1.5 crore (US$160,000) nett on its opening day from an estimated 600 screens which is more than the three Indian releases—Machine, Trapped, and Aa Gaya Hero—combined. Disney reported a total of ₹9.26 crore (US$990,000) gross for its opening weekend there. It was ahead of all new releases and second overall behind Badrinath Ki Dulhania and its Indian gross was around ₹17.63 crore (US$1.9 million).

In Russia, despite receiving a restrictive 16 rating, the film managed to deliver a very successful opening with $6 million.

In China, expectations were high for the film. The release date was announced on January 24, giving Disney and local distributor China Film Group Corporation ample time—around two months—to market the film nationwide. The release date was strategically chosen to coincide with White Day. Preliminary reports suggested that it could open to $40–60 million in its opening weekend. Largely driven by young women, its opening day pre-sales outpaced that of The Jungle Book. The original film was, however, never widely popular in the country. Although China has occasionally blocked gay-themed content from streaming video services, in this case, Chinese censors decided to leave the gay scene intact. According to local box office tracker Ent Group, the film grossed an estimated $12.1 million on its opening day (Friday), representing 70% of the total receipts. Including previews, it made a total of $14.5 million from 100,000 screenings, which is 43% of all screenings in the country. It climbed to $18.5 million on Saturday (102,700 showings) for a three-day total of $42.6 million, securing 60% of the total marketplace. Disney on the other hand reported a different figure of $44.8 million. Either-way, it recorded the second-biggest opening for a Disney live-action film, with $3.4 million coming from 386 IMAX screens. Japan—a huge Disney market—served as the film's final market and opened there on April 21. It debuted with a better-than-expected $12.5 million on its opening weekend helping the film push past the $1.1 billion threshold. An estimated $1.1 million came from IMAX screenings, the fourth-biggest ever in the country. The two-day gross was $9.7 million, outstripping Frozen's previous record of $9.5 million. The total there is now over $98 million after seven weekends and is the biggest film release of the year and, overall, the eleventh-biggest of all time. It topped the box office there for eight consecutive weekends.

The only markets where the film did not top the weekend charts were Vietnam (behind Kong: Skull Island), Turkey (with two local films and Logan ahead) and India (where Badrinath Ki Dulhania retained No. 1). It topped the box office for four straight weekends in Germany, Korea, Austria, Finland, Poland, Portugal, Brazil, Venezuela, Bolivia, Switzerland and the UK (exclusive of previews). In the Philippines, it emerged as the most successful commercial film of all time—both local and foreign—with over $13.5 million. In just five weeks, the film became one of the top 10 highest-grossing film of all time in the United Kingdom and Ireland, ahead of all but one Harry Potter film (Deathly Hallows – Part 2) and all three The Lord of the Rings films (which also starred Ian McKellen). It is currently the eighth-biggest grosser with £70.1 million ($90 million), overtaking Mamma Mia! to become the biggest musical production ever there. The biggest international earning markets following the UK are Japan ($108 million), China ($85.8 million), Brazil ($41.5 million), Korea ($37.5 million), and Australia ($35 million). In Europe alone, the cumulative total is $267 million, which led it to become the second-highest-grossing film in the past year (behind Rogue One: A Star Wars Story).

=== Critical response ===
Sources described critical reception towards Beauty and the Beast as ranging from generally positive to mixed or lukewarm. Overall, critics praised the cast, costumes, and production design, but generally found the remake inferior to the original. Jeff Albertson of The Seattle Times reported that while some critics praised the film’s faithfulness to the original, others viewed it as an unnecessary retread of the animated version. On Rotten Tomatoes, a review aggregator, the film has an approval rating of 71% based on 380 reviews and an average rating of 6.7/10. The website's critical consensus reads, "With an enchanting cast, beautifully crafted songs, and a painterly eye for detail, Beauty and the Beast offers a faithful yet fresh retelling that honors its beloved source material." On Metacritic, the film has a score of 65 out of 100 based on 47 critics, indicating "generally favorable" reviews. In CinemaScore polls, audiences gave the film an average grade of "A" on an A+ to F scale.

Leslie Felperin of The Hollywood Reporter wrote: "It's a Michelin-triple-starred master class in patisserie skills that transforms the cinematic equivalent of a sugar rush into a kind of crystal-meth-like narcotic high that lasts about two hours." Felperin also praised the performances of Watson and Kline as well the special effects, costume designs and the sets, while commending the inclusion of Gad's character of LeFou as the first LGBT character in Disney. Owen Gleiberman of Variety, in his positive review of the film, wrote: "It's a lovingly crafted movie, and in many ways a good one, but before that it's an enraptured piece of old-is-new nostalgia." Gleiberman compared Stevens' portrayal of the Beast to a royal version of the titular character in The Elephant Man and the 1946 version of the Beast in Jean Cocteau's original adaptation. A. O. Scott of The New York Times praised the performance of Stevens, and wrote: "It looks good, moves gracefully and leaves a clean and invigorating aftertaste. I almost didn't recognize the flavor: I think the name for it is joy."

However, The Washington Post's Ann Hornaday gave Watson's performance a mixed review, describing it as "alert and solemn" while deeming her singing abilities "serviceable enough to get the job done". Richard Roeper of the Chicago Sun-Times awarded the film three and a half out of five and lauded the performances of Watson and Thompson which he drew a comparison to Paige O'Hara's and Angela Lansbury's performances in the 1991 animated version while appreciating the performances of the other cast. He also commented on the advantage of its using both motion capture and CGI technology, writing: "Almost overwhelmingly lavish, beautifully staged and performed with exquisite timing and grace by the outstanding cast". Mike Ryan of Uproxx praised the cast, production design and the new songs while noting the film doesn't try anything different, saying: "There's certainly nothing that new about this version of Beauty and the Beast (well, except it isn't a cartoon anymore), but it's a good recreation of a classic animated film that should leave most die-hards satisfied." In her A− review, Nancy Churnin of The Dallas Morning News praised the film's emotional and thematic depth, remarking: "There's an emotional authenticity in director Bill Condon's live-action Beauty and the Beast film that helps you rediscover Disney's beloved 1991 animated film and 1994 stage show in fresh, stirring ways." James Berardinelli of ReelViews described the 2017 version as "enthralling".

Brian Truitt of USA Today commended the performances of Evans, Gad, McGregor and Thompson alongside Condon's affinity with musicals, the production design, visual effects featured in some of the song numbers including new songs made by the composers Alan Menken and Tim Rice, particularly Evermore which he described the new song with a potential for an Academy Award for Best Original Song. Peter Travers of Rolling Stone rated the film three out of four, deeming it an "exhilarating gift" while he remarked that "Beauty and the Beast does justice to Disney's animated classic, even if some of the magic is M.I.A (Missing in Action)". Stephanie Zacharek of Time magazine gave a positive review with a description as "Wild, Vivid and Crazy-Beautiful" as she wrote "Nearly everything about Beauty and the Beast is larger than life, to the point that watching it can be a little overwhelming." and added that "it's loaded with feeling, almost like a brash interpretive dance expressing the passion and elation little girls (and some boys, too) must have felt upon seeing the earlier version." The San Francisco Chronicle's Mick LaSalle struck an affirmative tone, calling it one of the joys of 2017, stating that "Beauty and the Beast creates an air of enchantment from its first moments, one that lingers and builds and takes on qualities of warmth and generosity as it goes along" while referring the film as "beautiful" and also praised the film for its emotional and psychological tone as well Stevens' motion capture performance.

Tim Robey of The Daily Telegraph gave the film four out of five and wrote that "It dazzles on this chocolate box of a picture that feels almost greedy yet to make this film work, down to a sugar-rush finale to grasp the nettle and make an out-an-out, bells-and-whistles musical" while he praised the performances of Watson, McKellen, Thompson, McGregor, Evans and Gad.

Several critics regarded the film as inferior to its 1991 animated predecessor. David Sims of The Atlantic wrote that the 2017 film "feels particularly egregious, in part, because it's so slavishly devoted to the original; every time it falls short of its predecessor (which is quite often), it's hard not to notice". Michael Phillips of the Chicago Tribune said that the 2017 film "takes our knowledge and our interest in the material for granted. It zips from one number to another, throwing a ton of frenetically edited eye candy at the screen, charmlessly." Phillips wrote that the film featured some "less conspicuously talented" performers ("Watson, primarily") who are "stuck doing karaoke, or motion-capture work of middling quality", though he praised Kline's performance as the "best, sweetest thing in the movie; he brings a sense of calm, droll authority". Peter Bradshaw of The Guardian wrote that the film was "lit in that fascinatingly artificial honey-glow light, and it runs smoothly on rails—the kind of rails that bring in and out the stage sets for the lucrative Broadway touring version." In the same newspaper, Wendy Ide criticized the film as "ornate to the point of desperation" in its attempt to emulate the animated film.

Chris Nashawaty of Entertainment Weekly gave the film a B−, writing that the new songs were "not transporting". He felt the film needed more life and depth. Dana Schwartz of The New York Observer felt that some of the characters, such as Gaston and the Beast, had been watered down from the 1991 film, and that the additional backstory elements failed to "advance the plot or theme in any meaningful way" while adding considerable bloat. Schwartz considered the singing of the cast to be adequate but felt that their voices should have been dubbed over, especially for the complex songs.

Robert W. Butler of The Charlotte Observer called it "big, well-designed, tuneful and — finally — romantic" but said it was not as good as the original. Chris Hunneysett of the Daily Mirror called the film "irresistible" and said, "There is excellence everywhere, from the superb cast, to sumptuous costumes and detailed design."

In a 2018 interview with The Hollywood Reporter's historical podcast, It Happened in Hollywood, Linda Woolverton, who wrote the 1991 animated film, revealed that she was not "totally thrilled" with the remake. She said "I didn't think it was exactly true to the mythology of the storytelling, and I'm not happy that I don't get to participate. Who would be?" Woolverton also questioned the change that saw The Beast come and go from his castle via a magic mirror. She said "The castle is supposed to be impenetrable. After that, the mythology didn't work for me."

=== Accolades ===
Award	Date of ceremony	Category	Recipient(s)	Result	Ref.
Academy Awards	March 4, 2018	Best Costume Design	Jacqueline Durran	Nominated	
Academy Awards	March 4, 2018	Best Production Design	Sarah Greenwood and Katie Spencer	Nominated	
Art Directors Guild Awards	January 27, 2018	Excellence in Production Design for a Fantasy Film	Sarah Greenwood	Nominated	
British Academy Film Awards	February 18, 2018	Best Production Design	Sarah Greenwood and Katie Spencer	Nominated	
British Academy Film Awards	February 18, 2018	Best Costume Design	Jacqueline Durran	Nominated	
Casting Society of America	January 18, 2018	Feature Big Budget – Comedy	Lucy Bevan, Bernard Telsey and Tiffany Little Canfield	Nominated	
Chicago Film Critics Association	December 12, 2017	Best Art Direction	Sarah Greenwood	Nominated	
Costume Designers Guild Awards	February 20, 2018	Excellence in Sci-Fi/Fantasy Film	Jacqueline Durran	Nominated	
Critics' Choice Movie Awards	January 11, 2018	Best Art Direction	Sarah Greenwood and Katie Spencer	Nominated	
Critics' Choice Movie Awards	January 11, 2018	Best Costume Design	Jacqueline Durran	Nominated	
Critics' Choice Movie Awards	January 11, 2018	Best Hair & Makeup	Beauty and the Beast	Nominated	
Critics' Choice Movie Awards	January 11, 2018	Best Song	"Evermore"	Nominated	
Empire Awards	March 18, 2018	Best Actress	Emma Watson	Nominated	
Empire Awards	March 18, 2018	Best Soundtrack	Beauty and the Beast	Nominated	
Empire Awards	March 18, 2018	Best Make-up and Hairstyling	Beauty and the Beast	Won	
Golden Trailer Awards	June 6, 2017	Best Animation/Family	Beauty and the Beast	Nominated	
Golden Trailer Awards	June 6, 2017	Best Original Score	Beauty and the Beast	Nominated	
Golden Trailer Awards	June 6, 2017	Best Animation/Family TV Spot	Beauty and the Beast	Nominated	
Golden Trailer Awards	June 6, 2017	Best Fantasy Adventure TV Spot	Beauty and the Beast	Nominated	
Guild of Music Supervisors Awards	February 8, 2018	Best Music Supervision for Film: Budgeted Over 25 Million Dollars	Matt Sullivan	Nominated	
Hollywood Film Awards	November 5, 2017	Costume Design Award	Jacqueline Durran (Note: Also credited for Darkest Hour.)	Won	
Hollywood Film Awards	November 5, 2017	Make-Up & Hair Styling Award	Jenny Shircore	Won	
Hollywood Music in Media Awards	November 16, 2017	Best Original Song – Animated Film	"How Does a Moment Last Forever" – Alan Menken and Tim Rice	Nominated	
Hollywood Music in Media Awards	November 16, 2017	Best Original Song – Sci-Fi, Fantasy, Horror Film	"How Does a Moment Last Forever" – Alan Menken and Tim Rice	Won	
Hollywood Music in Media Awards	November 16, 2017	Best Original Song – Sci-Fi, Fantasy, Horror Film	"Evermore" – Alan Menken and Tim Rice	Nominated	
Hollywood Music in Media Awards	November 16, 2017	Best Soundtrack Album	Beauty and the Beast	Nominated	
Hollywood Post Alliance	November 16, 2017	Outstanding Color Grading – Feature Film	Stefan Sonnenfeld	Nominated	
Hollywood Post Alliance	November 16, 2017	Outstanding Visual Effects – Feature Film	Kyle McCulloch, Glen Pratt, Richard Hoover, Dale Newton, Neil Weatherley and Framestore	Nominated	
Houston Film Critics Society	January 6, 2018	Best Original Song	"Evermore" – Alan Menken and Tim Rice	Nominated	
ICG Publicists Awards	March 2, 2018	Motion Picture	Beauty and the Beast	Nominated	
Make-Up Artists and Hair Stylists Guild	February 24, 2018	Feature Motion Picture: Best Period and/or Character Hair	Jenny Shircore, Marc Pilcher and Charlotte Hayward	Nominated	
MTV Movie & TV Awards	May 7, 2017	Movie of the Year	Beauty and the Beast	Won	
MTV Movie & TV Awards	May 7, 2017	Best Performance in a Movie	Emma Watson	Won	
MTV Movie & TV Awards	May 7, 2017	Best Kiss	Emma Watson and Dan Stevens	Nominated	
MTV Movie & TV Awards	May 7, 2017	Best Duo	Josh Gad and Luke Evans	Nominated	
MTV Movie & TV Awards	May 7, 2017	Best Musical Moment	"Beauty and the Beast" – Ariana Grande and John Legend	Nominated	
NAACP Image Awards	January 15, 2018	Outstanding Supporting Actress in a Motion Picture	Audra McDonald	Nominated	
Nickelodeon Kids' Choice Awards	March 24, 2018	Favorite Movie	Beauty and the Beast	Nominated	
Nickelodeon Kids' Choice Awards	March 24, 2018	Favorite Movie Actress	Emma Watson	Nominated	
San Diego Film Critics Society	December 11, 2017	Best Production Design	Sarah Greenwood and Katie Spencer	Nominated	
San Diego Film Critics Society	December 11, 2017	Best Visual Effects	Beauty and the Beast	Runner-up (Note: Tied with Dunkirk.)	
San Diego Film Critics Society	December 11, 2017	Best Costume Design	Jacqueline Durran	Won (Note: Tied with Mark Bridges for Phantom Thread.)	
San Diego Film Critics Society	December 11, 2017	Best Use of Music	Beauty and the Beast	Nominated	
Satellite Awards	February 10, 2018	Best Costume Design	Jacqueline Durran	Nominated	
Saturn Awards	June 27, 2018	Best Fantasy Film	Beauty and the Beast	Nominated	
Saturn Awards	June 27, 2018	Best Actress	Emma Watson	Nominated	
Saturn Awards	June 27, 2018	Best Production Design	Sarah Greenwood	Nominated	
Saturn Awards	June 27, 2018	Best Costume Design	Jacqueline Durran	Won	
Seattle Film Critics Society	December 18, 2017	Best Costume Design	Jacqueline Durran	Nominated	
St. Louis Film Critics Association	December 17, 2017	Best Production Design	Sarah Greenwood	Nominated	
St. Louis Film Critics Association	December 17, 2017	Best Visual Effects	Beauty and the Beast	Nominated	
Teen Choice Awards	August 13, 2017	Choice Movie: Fantasy	Beauty and the Beast	Won	
Teen Choice Awards	August 13, 2017	Choice Movie: Fantasy Actor	Dan Stevens	Nominated	
Teen Choice Awards	August 13, 2017	Choice Movie: Fantasy Actress	Emma Watson	Won	
Teen Choice Awards	August 13, 2017	Choice Movie Villain	Luke Evans	Won	
Teen Choice Awards	August 13, 2017	Choice Movie Ship	Emma Watson and Dan Stevens	Won	
Teen Choice Awards	August 13, 2017	Choice Liplock	Emma Watson and Dan Stevens	Won	
Teen Choice Awards	August 13, 2017	Choice Scene Stealer	Josh Gad	Nominated	
Teen Choice Awards	August 13, 2017	Choice Hissy Fit	Luke Evans	Nominated	
Teen Choice Awards	August 13, 2017	Choice Hissy Fit	Dan Stevens	Nominated	
Visual Effects Society Awards	February 13, 2018	Outstanding Virtual Cinematography in a Photoreal Project	Shannon Justison, Casey Schatz, Neil Weatherley and Claire Michaud for "Be Our Guest"	Nominated	
Washington D.C. Area Film Critics Association	December 8, 2017	Best Motion Capture Performance	Dan Stevens	Nominated	
Washington D.C. Area Film Critics Association	December 8, 2017	Best Production Design	Sarah Greenwood and Katie Spencer	Nominated	
Women Film Critics Circle	December 17, 2017	Best Family Film	Beauty and the Beast	Nominated	

== Controversies ==
=== Homosexual character ===
Controversy arose after director Bill Condon said there was a "gay moment" in the film, when LeFou briefly waltzes with Stanley, one of Gaston's friends. In a later interview with Vulture, Condon stated, "Can I just say, I'm sort of sick of this. Because you've seen the movie—it's such a tiny thing, and it's been overblown." Condon also added that Beauty and the Beast features much more diversity than just the highly talked-about LeFou: "That was so important. We have interracial couples—this is a celebration of everybody's individuality, and that's what's exciting about it." GLAAD president and CEO Sarah Kate Ellis praised the move, stating, "It is a small moment in the film, but it is a huge leap forward for the film industry."

In Russia, Vitaly Milonov agitated for culture minister Vladimir Medinsky to audit and potentially ban the film, but instead it was given a 16+ rating (people under the age of 16 can only be admitted to see it in theaters with accompanying adults). Additionally, a theater in Henagar, Alabama, did not screen the film because of the subplot. In Malaysia, the Film Censorship Board insisted the "gay moment" scene be cut, prompting an indefinite postponement of its release by Disney, followed by their decision to withdraw it completely if it could not be released uncensored. The studio moved the release date to March 30, to allow more time for Malaysia's censor board to make a decision on whether or not to release the film without changes. The distributors and producers then submitted an appeal to the country's Film Appeal Committee, which allowed the film to be released without any cuts and with a P13 rating on the grounds that "the gay element was minor and did not affect the positive elements featured in the film". In Kuwait, the film was withdrawn from cinemas by National Cinema Company, which owns most of the cinemas in the country. A board member of the company stated that the Ministry of Information's censorship department had requested it to stop its screening and edit it for things the Ministry deemed offensive.

The film also received criticism over its portrayal of LeFou, as some felt that it was used as a way of teasing LGBTQ+ audiences without providing adequate representation, with his "exclusively gay moment" being his three seconds' dancing with another man at the end of the film.

In response to the decision of making LeFou gay, Linda Woolverton, the screenwriter behind the 1991 animated film, told The Hollywood Reporter in 2018 that "Was he in love with Gaston? No. He was just a toady and besotted with a person he could never be."

=== Belle and the Beast's relationship ===
Disney has sought to portray Belle as an empowered young woman, but a debate over whether it is possible for a captor to fall in love with their prisoner, and whether this is a problematic theme, has resulted. As was the case with the original animated film, one argument is that Belle has Stockholm syndrome (a condition that causes hostages to develop a psychological alliance with their captors as a survival strategy during captivity). Before signing on to the film, Emma Watson did study whether Belle is trapped in an abusive relationship with the Beast and concluded that she does not think the criticism fits this version of the fairy tale. Watson described Stockholm syndrome as "where a prisoner will take on the characteristics of and fall in love with the captor." She went on to assert that "Belle actively argues and disagrees with the Beast constantly. She has none of the characteristics of someone with Stockholm syndrome because she keeps her independence, she keeps that freedom of thought", further adding that Belle defiantly "gives as good as she gets" before forming a friendship and eventual romance with the Beast.

Psychiatrist Frank Ochberg, who was responsible for defining the term "Stockholm syndrome", said he does not think Belle exhibits the trauma symptoms of prisoners with the syndrome because she does not experience a period of feeling that she is going to die. Some therapists, while acknowledging that the pairing's relationship does not meet the clinical definition of Stockholm syndrome, argue that the relationship depicted is dysfunctional and abusive and does not model healthy romantic relationships for young viewers. Following this viewpoint, Constance Grady of Vox stated that Jeanne-Marie Leprince de Beaumont's Beauty and the Beast was a fairy tale originally written to prepare young girls in eighteenth-century France for arranged marriages, and that the power disparity is amplified in the Disney version. Additionally, Anna Menta of Elite Daily remarked that the Beast does not apologize to Belle for imprisoning, hurting, nor manipulating her, and that his treatment of her is not painted as wrong.

=== Software usage ===
On December 21, 2023, a jury found that Disney used Rearden LLC's Mova motion capture software without permission for the film's Beast character and ordered for Disney to pay Rearden $600,000 in damages.

== Future ==
Shortly after the release of the film, Sean Bailey said that Walt Disney Pictures would "explore possible [live-action] spin-off and prequel scenarios" for animated and live-action Disney films, including Beauty and the Beast. Emma Watson and Dan Stevens have both expressed interest in reprising their roles in a potential sequel or prequel to the film.

On March 6, 2020, ABC Signature Studios announced that it was developing a limited series focused on Gaston and LeFou, for Disney+. Luke Evans and Josh Gad were set to reprise their roles from the film and executive produce the series alongside Eddy Kitsis and Adam Horowitz, with Gad, Kitsis, and Horowitz serving as showrunners and writers for the series. Alan Menken was reported to be in talks to return as composer for the series, which he confirmed in April. The series was titled Little Town, which is a nod to the lyrics of the song "Belle" from the 1991 Beauty and the Beast film. In June 2021, Brianna Middleton joined the cast as the female lead named Tilly. In January 2022, Jelani Alladin and Fra Fee joined the cast to play Jean-Michel and Prince Benoit Berlioz, respectively. In February 2022, Rita Ora and Sharon D. Clarke joined the cast, with the latter set to play Claire Lafayette. Days later, it was announced the series was put on hold indefinitely due to creative and scheduling issues. On August 13, 2024, when asked about the progress of the series, Luke Evans responded that the project was "sadly... not on the table", which implies that the series was no longer moving forward.
