= Suresh Shyamlal Gupta =

Indian politician

Suresh Gupta
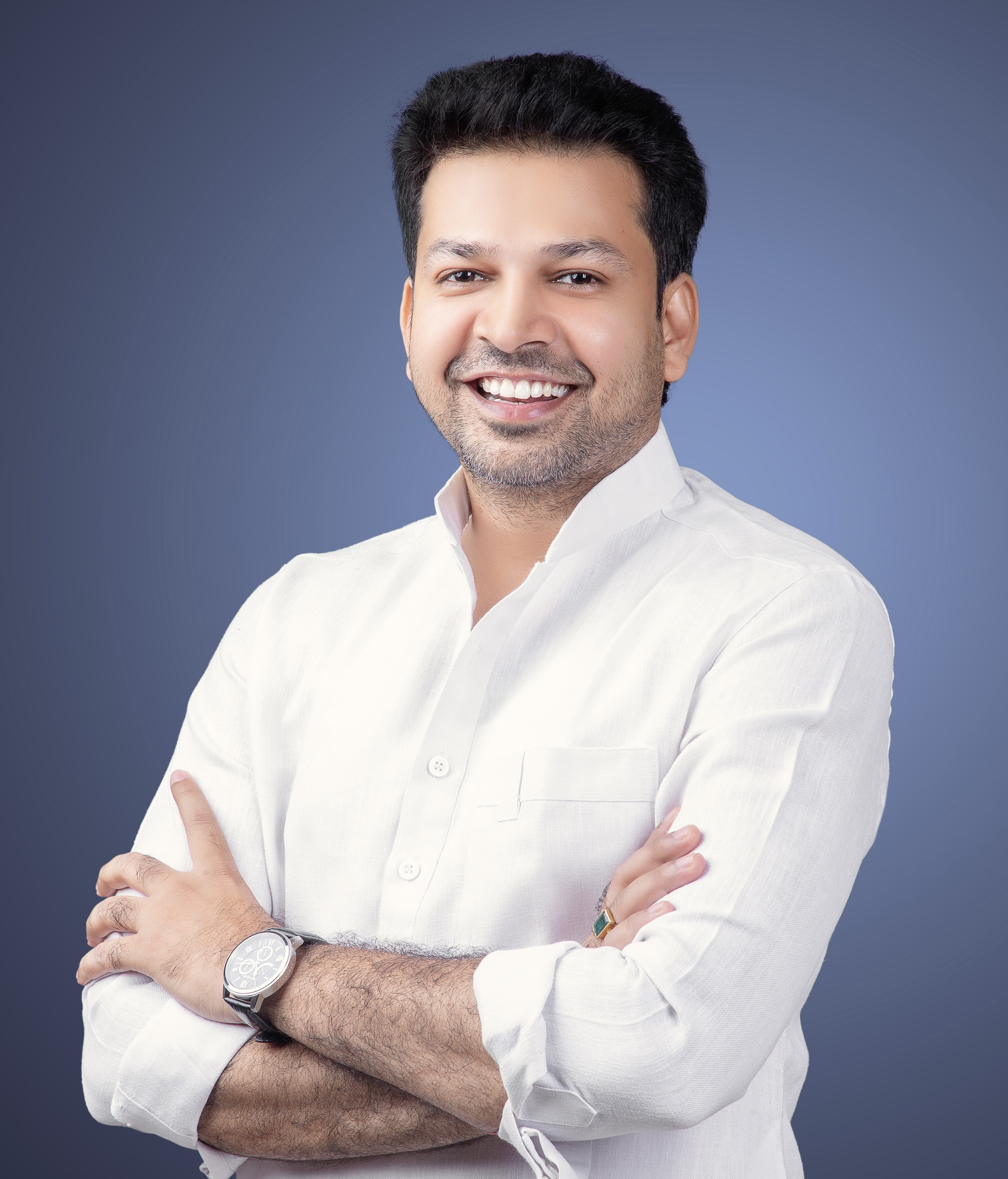
- Suresh Shyamlal Gupta
- Born: Suresh Shyamlal Gupta; 26 March 1988 (age 38); Mumbai, Maharashtra, India
- Education: Padmabhushan Vasantdada Patil Pratishthan's College of Engineering
- Occupations: Politician, social activist
- Years active: 2006 - present
- Known for: All Indian Cine Workers Association
- Political party: Indian National Congress

Suresh Shyamlal Gupta (born 26 March 1988) is an Indian politician, trade union leader, and social activist. He is the founder and president of the All Indian Cine Workers Association (AICWA) and holds the position of Mumbai President for the youth wing of the Indian National Trade Union Congress (INTUC). He also serves as a committee member of the Government of Maharashtra focusing on industries, labor, and energy.

As president of the INTUC body, he busted an illegal kidney racket at Hiranandani Hospital, Mumbai in 2016. As president of AICWA, he objected to the Netflix web series Sacred Games for insulting former Prime Minister of India Rajiv Gandhi. Following the 2019 Pulwama terror attack, he announced a ban on Pakistani artists and singers in India and an industry boycott of singer Mika Singh for performing at a wedding event in Pakistan.

== Early life and education ==
Suresh Gupta was born in Mumbai, Maharashtra. His ancestral village is Borra, Pratapgarh, Uttar Pradesh. He attended Sandesh Vidyalaya School and Uttar Bhartiya Sabha School in Mumbai for his early education. He attended S.K. Somaiya College and earned a degree in Electronics and Telecommunications Engineering from Padmabhushan Vasantdada Patil Pratishthan's College of Engineering.

== Political career ==
In 2013, he was appointed as the Mumbai President of the Youth Wing of the Indian National Trade Union Congress. In 2014 he became the National Secretary of Youth Wing of the Indian National Trade Union Congress.

== All Indian Cine Workers Association ==
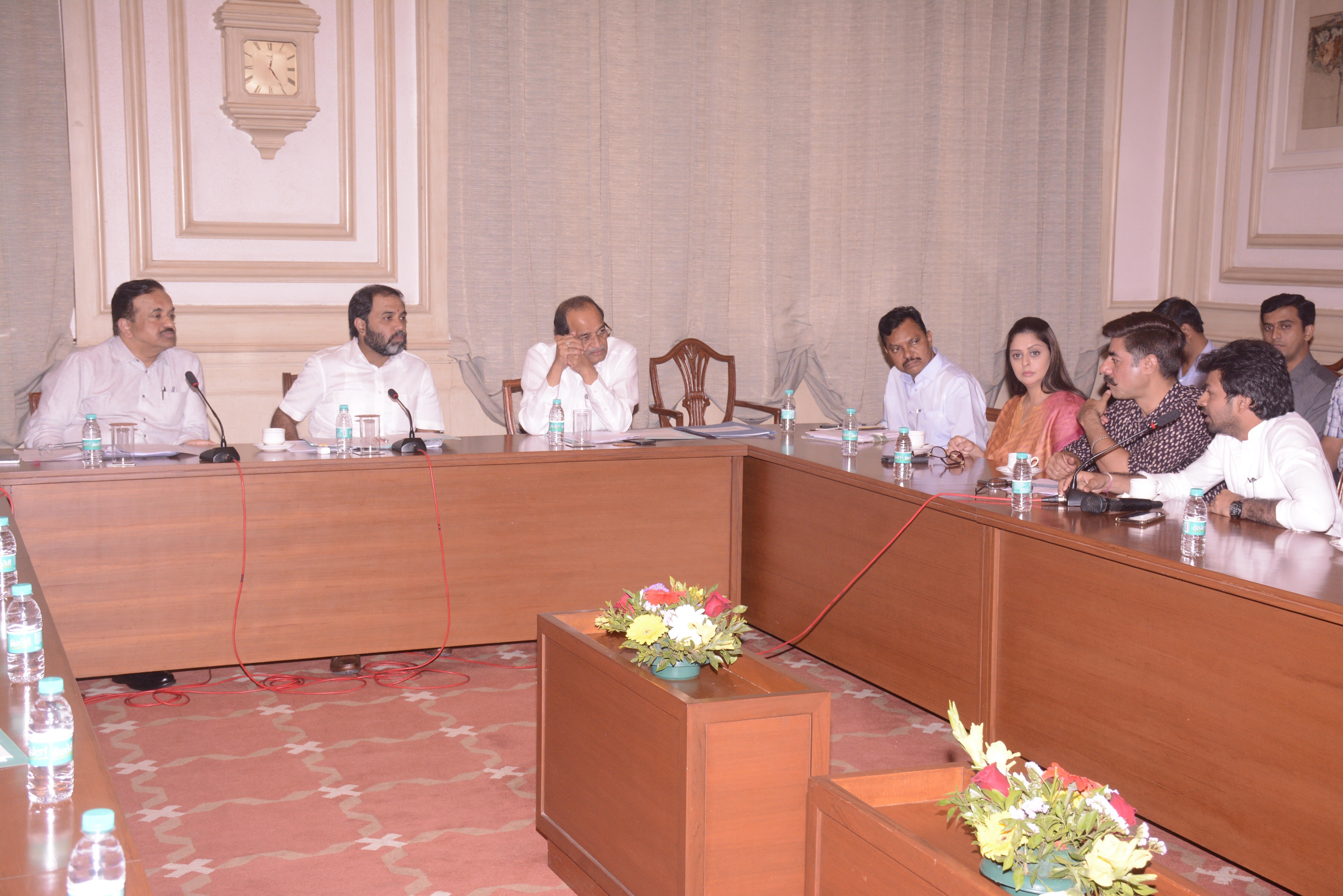
Meeting regarding film industry at Sahyadri House, Chief Minister's Office, Mumbai

In 2016, he founded All Indian Cine Workers Association (AlCWA), a non-profit organisation aimed at addressing the concerns and issues faced by artists, workers, and labourers within the Indian Film Industry.

In a meeting with the government authorities, the Government of Maharashtra agreed to establish a committee dedicated to the welfare and rights of individuals in the film industry. Gupta was appointed as the employee representative on this committee. Under his presidency, the organization has raised issues and made demands related to the Indian film and television industry.

=== The ‘Sacred Games’ controversy ===
After a complaint was filed in Kolkata in July 2018 against the Netflix web series Sacred Games, its showrunners and lead actor Nawazuddin Siddiqui, for allegedly insulting former Indian Prime Minister Rajiv Gandhi in one scene, Gupta, as President of AICWA, filed a complaint at the Chembur police station, A Public Interest Litigation on the matter was later filed in the Delhi High Court.

=== Ban on Pakistani artists ===
Following the 2019 Pulwama attack by the Pakistan-based terrorist organization Jaish-e-Mohammed (JeM) in Jammu and Kashmir, AICWA announced a complete ban on Pakistani actors and artists. Gupta said the attack was "cowardly" and the most shameful act Pakistan has ever done, it will take strict action against anyone working with Pakistani artists. In reciprocation of the ban, a petition was filed in the Lahore High Court seeking a ban on the trade of Indian films in Pakistan.

=== Mika Singh's Pakistan performance controversy ===
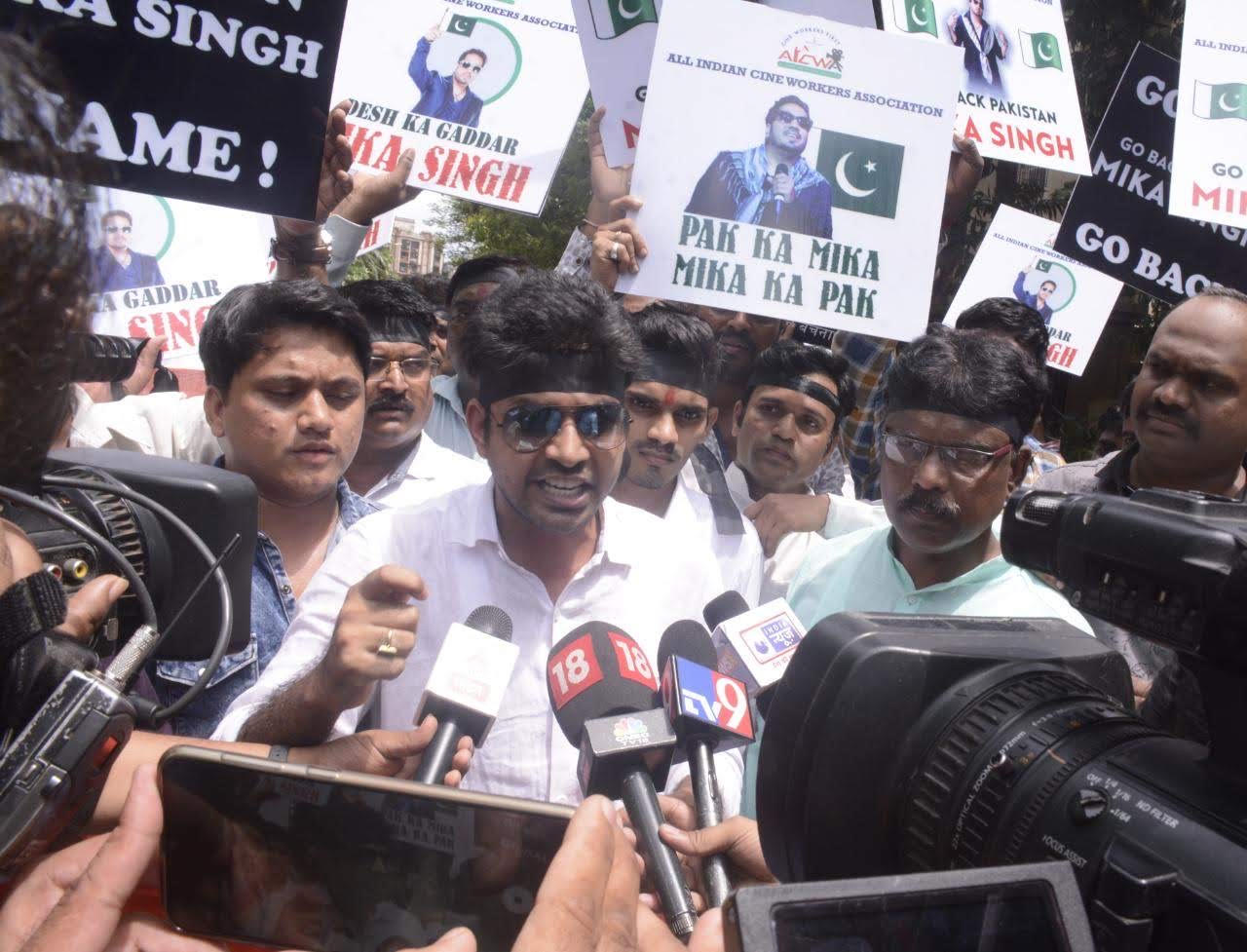
Protested against singer Mika Singh's

AICWA protested against singer Mika Singh's performance at an event in Pakistan in August 2019, and boycotted him from any association with film production houses, music companies and online music content providers. The Federation of Western India Cine Employees (FWICE) also issued the ban against him and his crew who performed at the event, but revoked the ban after he apologized.

=== Director Raju Sapte's suicide ===
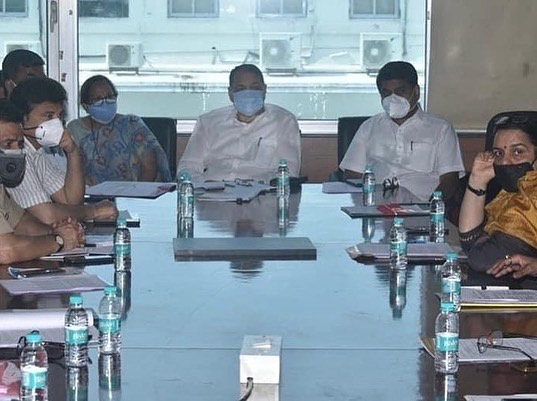
Meeting at Mantralaya under the leadership of the Home Minister regarding the Raju Sapte case, August 2021

Art director Raju Sapte’s suicide was raised in the Maharashtra Legislative Assembly on AICWA's demand, following which a meeting was held under the leadership of Home Minister Dilip Walse-Patil and State Home Minister Satej Patil, and orders were issued for strict action against the culprits. In August 2021, the accused were arrested by the Mumbai Police for alleged extortion.

=== Poonam Pandey death stunt ===
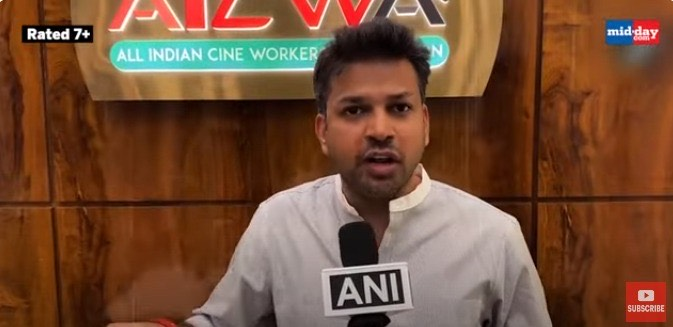
During a press interaction regarding the Poonam Pandey death incident

In February 2024, model-actor Poonam Pandey and her agency, Schbang, executed a fake death stunt to raise awareness about cervical cancer, leading to public outrage and calls for legal action. Gupta, as President of AICWA, demanded that the Mumbai Police Commissioner register an FIR against Pandey and her manager, arguing that their actions could damage the credibility of death announcements within the Indian film industry and potentially exploit serious health issues for personal gain. Following the public backlash, Pandey and her agency apologized, explaining that their intention was to highlight the seriousness of cervical cancer and to emphasize the importance of its prevention and awareness.

== Bust of illegal kidney trade ==
Suresh Gupta busted a kidney racket at Hiranandani Hospital, Mumbai in 2016. His efforts led to a change in the law on organ transplantation in Maharashtra.

This incident resulted in the arrest of more than 20 people, including Hiranandani Hospital CEO Sujit Chatterjee, several doctors and agents.

Certain types of keywords were being used for illegal kidneys in Hiranandani Hospital, after which many illegal kidney rackets were busted in Maharashtra and many places in India. Fraudulent documents prepared for donors and recipients for an illegal kidney transplant that showed fraudulent family ties between them. High-profile people were involved in this case.Key witness and victim Sundar Singh Jatav, through a friend, approached Suresh Gupta for help uncovering this complex kidney trafficking network. Soon after the FIR was registered, Sundar started receiving death threats.

After Jatav was found hanging at his home in 2016, Gupta demanded a CBI inquiry as he claimed it was not a case of suicide. Gupta alleged that bloodstains were found on the floor of Singh's residence.
