= Jagbir Dahiya =

Indian film director & producer

Jagbir Dahiya is an Indian film director and producer. He directed and produced Kuch Kariye starring Sukhwinder Singh, Shirya Saran and directed The Journey of Karma starring Shakti Kapoor and Poonam Pandey. Recently he started his music label Asian Records.

== Filmography ==
No.	Film	Release	Role
1	Kuchh Kariye	2010	Director & Producer
2	The Journey Of Karma	2018	Director & Producer
