= Love Is Poison =

Love is Poison
- theatre poster
- Directed by: Nandan Prabhu
- Written by: Nandan Prabhu
- Produced by: K Somashekar
- Starring: Balle Rajesh; Shruthi Raj
- Cinematography: Veenus Murthy
- Edited by: E S Eshwar
- Music by: Sai Kiran
- Production company: Akash Enterprises
- Release date: 20 June 2014
- Running time: 132 min
- Country: India
- Language: Kannada

Love Is Poison is a 2014 Indian Kannada-language drama film directed by Nandan Prabhu starring Balley Rajesh and Shruthi Raj in the lead roles.

== Summary ==
The film is a story about today's youth that take impulsive decisions. In the film, the protagonist is a boy from a village, who comes to the city and falls in love with the heroine.

== Cast ==
- Rajesh
- Shruti Raj
- Sadhu Kokila
- Bullet Prakash
- Nagamagala Jayaram
- Doohi
- Chandru
- Biradar
- Honnavalli Krishna
- Poonam Pandey

== Production ==
The film was in the news for featuring an item number with Bollywood actress Poonam Pandey. The film also received media attention when actor "Jungle Jackie" Rajesh died during the shooting of this film.

== Soundtrack ==
The music was composed by Sai Kiran and released under the label of Anand Audio video. The audio launch was held in tribute to Balle Rajesh.

Love is Poison

Soundtrack album by Sai Kiran
- Released: Dec 11, 2013
- Recorded: 2013
- Genre: Soundtrack
- Length: 21:01
- Label: Anand Audio Video
- Producer: Sai Kiran

Track list
No.	Title	Lyrics	Singer(s)	Length
1.	"E Khali Hrudaya"	Ravi Shankarnag	Sonu Nigam	4:28
2.	"Kanna Munde"	Kaviraj	Tippu	4:26
3.	"Yako Kaane Dinaa"	Panakanahalli Prasanna	Palak Muchhal, Love Guru Rajesh	4:02
4.	"Shyane Ishta Criketu"	V. Nagendra Prasad	Mamta Sharma	4:03
5.	"Dhyaniyagiruve"	Panakanahalli Prasanna	Palak Muchhal	4:02
Total length:				21:01
