= Padmabhushan Vasantdada Patil Pratishthan's College of Engineering =

College in Mumbai, India

Coordinates: 19.050522°N 72.878392°E

Vasantdada Patil Pratishthan's College of Engineering & Visual Arts
- Type: Private
- Established: 1990
- Founder: Manohar (Mama) Phalke
- Accreditation: NAAC Grade:A
- Principal: Alam N. Shaikh
- Location: Mumbai, Maharashtra, India
- Campus: Metropolitan
- Website: www.pvppcoe.ac.in

Padmabhushan Vasantdada Patil Pratishthan's College of Engineering (PVPP COE) is an engineering college in Mumbai, India, established in 1990.

The college is a tribute to the late Shri Vasantdada Patil. Former deputy Prime Minister Yeshwantrao Chavan laid the foundation of the college.

In 2016, a case was registered against the founder and principal of the institute for failure to provide economic backward class (EBC) scholarships to 2,500 students.

== Notable alumni ==
- Suresh Shyamlal Gupta, Politician and activist.

== See also ==
- List of colleges in Mumbai
