= Kuchh Kariye =

Indian Hindi film

Kuchh Kariye is an Indian Hindi film directed and produced by Jagbir Dahiya starring Sukhwinder Singh, Shriya Saran, Suresh Chatwal, Dinesh Hingoo, Mushtaq Khan, Surendra Pal and Mukesh Tiwari. Kuch Kariye was released in 2010.

== Plot ==
Sukhwinder, a small-town guy, moves to Mumbai with his girlfriend to pursue his passion for music. Sukhwinder teams up with a group of actors and film-makers who are eager to help him realize his dreams. However, he is thrown off his feet when he meets terrorists.

== Cast ==
No.	Cast	Character
1.	Sukhwinder Singh	Rishi
2.	Suresh Chatwal	Nandkumar
3.	Dinesh Hingoo	Govershan Bhai
4.	Ahmed Khan	Kari
5.	Mushtaq Khan	Pappu Halva
6.	Rufy Khan	Shani
7.	Khuahhish	Roza
8.	Vikrum Kumar	Javed Khan
9.	Anil Nagrath	Jaqub
10.	Surendra Pal	Commissioner
11.	Anil Pandey	Politician
12.	Shriya Saran	Alpana
13.	Deepak Shirke	Anna Swami
14.	Ranjha Vikram Singh	Javed Khan (as Vikram Singh)
15.	Mukesh Tiwari	Banda Nawaj
16.	Abhay Bhargava	Neta (as Abhay Bhargav)

== Reception ==
Times of India gave two star and wrote" Here's another singer who wants to become an actor. Now, there's nothing wrong with that really. But hey, why must they all want to do stuff superstars do! Like chasing terrorists, shaking their legs on the dance floor, serenading girls in meadows and even stripping their shirt. Why can't they leave all that routine stuff to Shah Rukh and Salman and concentrate on plausible character-driven stories." Taran Adarsh from Bollywood Hungama gave one star and wrote" On the whole, KUCHH KARIYE is a big yawn." Komal Nahta from Koimoi wrote "Kuchh Kariye will not be able to do anything at the ticket windows. A dry, drab and dull enterprise, it will bomb miserably at the box-office."
