= The Journey of Karma =

2018 Hindi film

- Theatrical release poster
- Directed by: Jagbir Dahiya
- Written by: Rupesh Paul
- Produced by: Jagbir Dahiya
- Starring: Poonam Pandey; Shakti Kapoor
- Cinematography: Salih Salam
- Edited by: Akshay Kaledy
- Music by: Danish Alfaaz; Nishant Salil; Onkar Minhas
- Production company: Surya Entertainment
- Release date: 26 October 2018
- Running time: 98 minutes
- Country: India
- Language: Hindi

The Journey of Karma is a 2018 Hindi film starring Poonam Pandey and Shakti Kapoor directed by Jagbir Dahiya and written by Rupesh Paul. The Journey of Karma was released on 26 October 2018.

== Premise ==
It is a story of a slum girl who is good in studies and tries to chase her dreams to works at US. She travels through her journey packed with twist'n turns, surprises & lust with a mysterious old man.

== Cast ==
- Poonam Pandey as Karma D'souza
- Shakti Kapoor as Mahek D. Shukla
- Shravani
- Shivender Dahiya
- Kressy Singh as Karma D'souza's Friend

== Soundtrack ==
The Journey of Karma

Soundtrack album by Danish Alfaaz, Nishant Salil and Onkar Minhas
- Released: 25 October 2018
- Recorded: 2018
- Genre: Feature film soundtrack
- Length: 24:32
- Label: Surya Entertainment
External audio
- Official Audio Jukebox on YouTube

The music of the film is composed by Danish Alfaaz, Nishant Salil and Onkar Minhas.

No.	Title	Singer(s)	Length
1.	"Maula Mere"	Danish Alfaaz	6:01
2.	"Sugar Biscuit"	Lyla, Danish Alfaaz	2:52
3.	"Parinde"	Sukhwinder Singh	5:06
4.	"Aao Na"	Lyla	4:05
5.	"Oh Baby"	Amrita Talukder	2:58
6.	"The Journey of Karma"	Sukhwinder Singh, Amrita Talukder, Lyla, Danish Alfaaz, Nishant Salili	3:30
Total length:			24:32
