= Malini & Co. =

- Directed by: Veeru K.
- Written by: Veeru K.
- Produced by: Mahesh Rathi; S. N. Uppalapati; Kishore Rathi
- Starring: Poonam Pandey; Samrat Reddy; Suman
- Cinematography: C. Ramprasad
- Edited by: M. R. Varma
- Music by: V. Gopal
- Production company: Manisha Films
- Distributed by: Manisha Films
- Release date: 28 August 2015
- Country: India
- Language: Telugu

Malini & Co. is a 2015 Indian Telugu-language action film based on terrorism. The film stars Poonam Pandey, Samrat Reddy, and Suman.

== Cast ==
- Poonam Pandey as Malini
- Samrat Reddy as Dharmendra
- Suman
- Samba Siva
- Ajay Rathnam
- Zakir Hussain
- Ravi Kale
- Kavya Singh
- Jeeva

== Soundtrack ==
The music was composed by K.Veeru and K.Gopal and released by Vega Music. All Lyrics were written by Veeru K.

Malini & Co

Soundtrack album by K.Veeru K.Gopal
- Released: 6 October 2015
- Recorded: 2015
- Genre: Soundtrack
- Length: 18:50
- Language: Telugu
- Label: Vega Music
- Producer: K.Veeru; K.Gopal

Track list
No.	Title	Singer(s)	Length
1.	"Malini (Title Song)"	Malgudi Subha	2:14
2.	"Jagamantha"	Sameera Bharadwaj	3:31
3.	"Premichi Champe"	Geetha Madhuri, Sameera	3:42
4.	"Ededo Neelo Aasa"	Lipsika, Hema, Sam	3:03
5.	"Hello Hello Doctor"	Lipsika, Sam	2:57
6.	"Malli Malii"	Gayatri	3:23
Total length:			18:50
