= Film Censorship Board of Malaysia =

Malaysian government censorship board

LPF
- Lembaga Penapis Filem

Agency overview
- Formed: 1 May 1954
- Status: Active
- Headquarters: Putrajaya
- Minister responsible: Saifuddin Nasution Ismail, Minister of Home Affairs
- Deputy Minister responsible: Shamsul Anuar Nasarah, Deputy Minister of Home Affairs
- Parent agency: Malaysian Ministry of Home Affairs
- Website: lpf.moha.gov.my

The Film Censorship Board of Malaysia (Malay: Lembaga Penapis Filem) is the Malaysian government ministry that is responsible for film censorship in Malaysia. It is under the control of the Ministry of Home Affairs.

== History and legislative regulations ==
LPF was established on 1 May 1954 in Singapore, with two committees: one for Malaya in Kuala Lumpur, and one for the Straits Settlements in Singapore. It was initially a branch office of the Malayan Censorship Board. In 1965 or 1966, after Singapore separated from Malaysia, the LPF's headquarters were relocated to Kuala Lumpur.

The original laws for the censorship policy were the Cinematograph Films Ordinance 1952 (amended in 1966) and Akta (Penapisan) Filem 1952 (Akta 35), which were then superseded by Akta Penapisan Filem 2002 (Akta 620), the Film Censorship Act 2002.

Any film that is to be screened in Malaysia must be certified by the Board. Under the provisions of the Act, no one is allowed to view any film that has not been licensed by the Board.

The Board watches the uncensored film or programme and decides whether its content is acceptable for a Malaysian audience. The film receives approval only after the Board is satisfied that the film (either without cuts or with cuts required by the Board) satisfies the rules under which the Board operates.
