= Aa Gaya Hero =

2017 Indian film by Dipankar Senapati

- Promotional poster
- Directed by: Dipankar Senapati; Dinesh Chand Meena (DCM)
- Written by: Govinda
- Produced by: Govinda
- Starring: Govinda; Ashutosh Rana; Murali Sharma; Makarand Deshpande; Chandrachur Singh; Harish Kumar; Shekhar Kant Jha
- Music by: Meet Bros; Vicky & Hardik; Arghya Banerjee
- Production companies: Mangal Tara T.V & Films
- Distributed by: Paras Maan
- Release date: 17 March 2017
- Country: India
- Language: Hindi
- Budget: ₹8.50 crores
- Box office: ₹1.39 crores

Aa Gaya Hero (transl. Here Comes The Hero) is a 2017 Indian action comedy film directed by Dipankar Senapati starring Govinda in the lead role. Previously titled Abhinay Chakra, it was Govinda's comeback film. The film received highly negative reviews from critics.

== Plot ==
ACP Ravindra Varma (Govinda) is a daring and sincere police officer assigned to apprehend a dreaded terrorist (Milind Shinde). While pursuing him, Ravindra Varma discovers that two ministers (Surendra Pal and Makrand Deshpande) are secretly working with the terrorist.

The ministers are also supported by two brothers (Murali Sharma and Ashutosh Rana), who act as their right-hand men. Ravindra Varma sets out to expose and bring the corrupt ministers, their associates and the terrorist to justice. The film follows his efforts to determine whether he can overcome their powerful criminal network and bring the culprits to book.

== Cast ==
- Govinda as ACP Ravindra Verma
- Ashutosh Rana
- Murli Sharma
- Makarand Deshpande
- Harish Kumar
- Chandrachur Singh
- Richa Sharma
- Poonam Pandey in an item number

== Promotion ==
Govinda visited the BSF camp near Najafgarh, Delhi, to promote the film. He got an opportunity to have a conversation with the BSF jawans. He did a lot of activities there, from having lunch to making the jawans dance with their family members. He also promoted the film on The Kapil Sharma Show, where he was joined by his wife and actor Shakti Kapoor, who was shooting nearby and decided to drop in and meet him.

== Soundtrack ==
The soundtrack of the film features seven tracks which was released 15 February 2017.

No.	Title	Singer(s)	Length
1.	"Lohe Da Liver"	Mika Singh, Meet Bros	2:51
2.	"Aa Gaya Hero (Title Track)"	Arghya Banerjee	4:33
3.	"Police Wala Don"	Ahan, Poorvi Koutish	4:19
4.	"UP Ki Don"	Arghya Banerjee	3:38
5.	"Dirty Flirty"	Mika Singh, Swati Sharma	3:05
6.	"Lo Hoigwa"	Ahan	4:59
7.	"Mahiya"	Ahan	4:52
Total length:			28:20

== Release ==
Aa Gaya Hero was certified U/A by the CBFC on 6 March 2017. The film released in 300 screens on 17 March 2017 all over India along with other releases being Machine and Trapped.

== Reception ==
BookMyShow reviewed the film and wrote, "Catch the film in your nearest theatre to entertain yourself with a two-hour parody of the 90s, with signature Govinda dance moves and hilarious dialogues and action. Take along your friends to experience a laugh riot. However The Times of India gave it 1.5 stars saying "Unfortunately, besides the actor's trademark dance moves, there is nothing worth watching here. The 'hero' might just need to make another comeback soon and hopefully a more 'relevant' one this time."

== Box office ==
The film had a disappointing box office performance despite strong initial showings. It made 23 lakh on its opening day, 32 lakh on Saturday, and 42 lakh on Sunday, totaling 97 lakh in its first weekend. By Friday, its total domestic earnings had reached 1.66 crores, with its second-weekend collection of 17 lakh bringing the total to 1.80 crores. Its lifetime domestic earnings amounted to 2.78 crores. Overseas, it started strong with 10 lakh on Friday and 50 lakh over its first weekend, but its total overseas earnings reached only 99 lakh. The film had a modest success in Malaysia with 40 screens but ultimately grossed 1.39 crores against a production budget of 8 crores, making it a financial disaster.
