= Film censorship in Malaysia =

Film censorship in Malaysia is pervasive since its conception under British rule under the 1908 Theatre Ordinance enacted by the Straits Settlements colonial government starting 1912. Even with the successive independence of these colonies, the Film Censorship Board of Malaysia (Malay: Lembaga Penapis Filem) is the government ministry that which dictates whether, when, and how a film gets released in the country. It is under the control of the Ministry of Home Affairs (Malay: Kementerian Dalam Negeri). The government censors film content for mainly homosexual, political and religious reasons.

Any film passed with compulsory cuts must have the cuts made by the distributor before the film is released/screened. This is accomplished either by having the studio produce an edited version (in the case of digital or television screenings) or by physically removing (cutting out) the offending section on the film itself. Screening films with compulsory cuts in its unedited form can make the distributor and cinema operator or television station operator legally liable.

The Film Censorship Act 2002 bans the possession and/or screening of pornography or provocative materials. Films that contain sex and nude scenes are strictly censored/prohibited. Screening of such films in public, even in good faith, can subject the screener to fines/imprisonment.

The two main cinema operators in Malaysia, Golden Screen Cinemas and Tanjung Golden Village, are known to be strict in ensuring that only patrons aged 18 and above are allowed to view films rated "18". Although movies shown in Malaysian cinemas carry an age-restricted rating such as "18", films that contain scenes of sex and nudity are completely censored off by the LPF (Malaysia's film censorship board), which renders the 18 rating meaningless and strict entry by the cinema operators pointless.

Kissing and make-out scenes are also censored in movies rated "P13" but in recent years the Board has loosened the censorship. On the other hand, there have been many "18" rated films filled with profanity and graphic violence that were hardly censored or uncensored in recent years. This shows that the board mostly views sex and nudity as completely unacceptable for a Malaysian audience.

== Rating system ==
The rating system for movies shown in Malaysian cinemas has evolved over time:

1953	1996	April 2010	January 2012	February 2023	Description	
General Viewing	U (Umum/Universal; Everyone)				For general audiences. Persons of all ages are admitted. Used by the majority of films screened in Malaysia until 2008 but it continues only for television, notably for RTM.	
—N/a		PG13 ("Parental Guidance 13")	P13 (Penjaga 13)	P12 (Parental Guidance)	P12: Persons under 12 years old must be supervised by their parent or an adult guardian. P13/PG13: Parental guidance required for audiences under the age of 13. Passionate kissing scenes are not allowed. Introduced in 2006, this became the official Malaysian motion picture rating system in 2008. They used a temporary rating called "U - PG-13" for movies like "Remp-It", "Congkak" and "Jangan Pandang Belakang", then they renamed it to "PG13" for the movie Quantum Of Solace before it was made official. The "PG-13" rating was revised to "P13" from January 2012 onwards to emphasize the use of Malay language instead of English. In February 2023, Film Censorship Board of Malaysia announced that they will change the "P13" to "P12" to accommodate more children and teenagers. This was made so that more people have more freedom in watching the movie without worrying about ages.	
—N/a				13 (Teen)	Admission restricted to persons aged 13 and above. Persons under 13 years old are not admitted. Proof of age must be shown before entering the theater.	
—N/a				16 (Mature)	Admission restricted to persons aged 16 and above. Persons under 16 years old are not admitted. Proof of age must be shown before entering the theater.	
For Adults Only	18SG (Seram, Ganas: "Graphic Violence and Horror/Terror")	18 (Adults Only)			Film may contain strong violence, gore or horror/terror people may find objectionable.	Admission restricted to persons aged 18 and above. Persons under 18 years old are not admitted. Proof of age must be shown before entering the theater. Cinemas may be strict on age checking to make sure only persons aged 18 and above can watch the movie. On television, programmes with this rating may only be broadcast from 10pm to 5am. In April 2010, Film Censorship Board of Malaysia removed subcategories of 18 due to low usage. The four 18 categories were superseded by the simplified 18 rating, which makes no distinction on what type of objectionable content is contained within the movie.
For Adults Only	18SX (Seks: "Sexual Content")	18 (Adults Only)			Film may contain sex scenes, nudity or sexual dialogue/references people may find objectionable (despite scenes of sex and nudity being strictly censored off by the LPF)	
For Adults Only	18PA (Politik, Agama: "Strong Religious or Political Elements")	18 (Adults Only)			Film may contain elements which include religious, social or political aspects people may find objectionable. (Rarely used)	
For Adults Only	18PL (Pelbagai: "Various")	18 (Adults Only)			Film may contain strong violence, gore, horror/terror, sex scenes, nudity, sexual dialogues/references, religious, social or political aspects people may find objectionable. (The majority of the 18+ movies use this rating. For example, a film with sex scenes and strong violence will be classified as 18PL.) (despite scenes of sex and nudity being strictly censored off by the LPF)	

Film classification logos used in January 2012 until February 2023.

The new film classification logos introduced since February 2023.

== Banned films ==
Over the years, various films has been banned in Malaysia.

On 4 March 2007, the Malaysian Censorship Board decided to ban Tsai Ming-liang's film, I Don't Want to Sleep Alone, based on 18 counts of incidents shown in the film depicting the country "in a bad light" for cultural, ethical, and racial reasons. However, they later allowed the film to be screened in the country after Tsai agreed to censor parts of the film according to the requirements of the Censorship Board.
