= Poonam Pandey =

Indian media personality and actress (born 1991)

- Born: 11 March 1991 (age 35)
- Occupations: Media personality; actress
- Years active: 2010–present

Poonam Pandey (born 11 March 1991) is an Indian media personality and actress. She debuted in Hindi cinema with the erotic film Nasha in 2013. She was also a contestant in Khatron Ke Khiladi 4 (2011) and Lock Upp season 1 (2022).

== Early life and media spotlight ==
Pandey was born in a middle class family in Mumbai on 11 March 1991. Her family originally belongs to Jaunpur, Uttar Pradesh. She began career as a model in 2010.She became one of the top nine contestants of the Gladrags Manhunt and Megamodel Contest and appeared on the cover page of the fashion magazine.

Pandey rose to the media's spotlight when she promised to strip for the India national cricket team if it won the 2011 Cricket World Cup. India indeed lifted the World Cup; however, Pandey did not fulfill her promise due to public disapproval, but later claimed she was denied permission by the Board of Control for Cricket in India.

In 2012, she posed nude after Kolkata Knight Riders won the Indian Premier League.

In 2017, Poonam Pandey launched a mobile application named the Pandey App, which featured adult-oriented content. Within an hour of its release, Google removed the app from the Play Store, citing violations of its content policy. The removal of the app led to discussions and debate regarding freedom of expression on digital platforms.

== Film career ==
In 2013, she played the female lead of the film Nasha, playing a teacher who ends up having a sexual relationship with one of her students. While Rediff.com stated that she excelled as a seductress in the role, the Mumbai Mirror said she did "not play seductresses but a proper, responsible drama teacher" and that "Poonam makes an effort but isn't quite there".

The posters for the film, which featured her "clad in nothing, but two placards tactfully placed to cover her body", angered people and a group of protesters tore the posters and set them on fire on 20 July 2013 in Mumbai. The general secretary of Shiv Sena Chitrapat objected to advertisements, saying, "We find the poster highly vulgar and derogatory and won't allow such hoardings."

== Personal life ==
On 5 November 2020, Pandey was arrested in North Goa for filming a nude video on government property. The arrest came after the Goa Forward Party filed a complaint and FIR, and stated to the media that Pandey's video was an assault on the women of Goa.

On 18 January 2022, she was given protection from arrest by the Supreme Court of India after being accused of involvement in the major porn-film-racketing scandal, that involved many Bollywood stars. The Bombay High Court had earlier rejected her anticipatory bail plea, prompting Pandey to approach the Supreme Court. Along with actor Sherlyn Chopra, Pandey was named as an accused in an FIR registered by the Mumbai Police's Cyber Cell under various sections of the Indian Penal Code, the Indecent Representation of Women (Prevention) Act, and the Information Technology Act. The case alleged the creation and distribution of sexually explicit content.

=== Death stunt ===
Pandey's manager posted on her official Instagram account through a post that Pandey had died of cervical cancer on 1 February 2024, at the age of 32. Following the announcement of Poonam Pandey's purported death, Kanpur Police initiated efforts to trace her based on reports that she was a resident of Kanpur. Subsequent inquiries by Police, however, found those reports to be incorrect, and later reports established that she originally hailed from a village in Jaunpur district. The next day it was revealed to be a publicity stunt to raise awareness about the disease, which received widespread criticism.

Pandey publicly apologised after the All Indian Cine Workers Association demanded that the Mumbai Police Commissioner file an FIR against her.

== Filmography ==
=== Films ===
Year	Title	Role	Notes	Ref.
2013	The Uncanny	Rita	Short film	
2013	Nasha	Anita Joseph	In Hindi	
2014	Love Is Poison	Herself	In Kannada, Special appearance in song "Shyane Ishta Cricketettu"	
2014	Adalat	Herself	in Bhojpuri	
2015	Malini & Co.	Malini	in Telugu	
2017	Aa Gaya Hero	Herself	in Hindi, Special appearance in a song	
2017	GST – Galti Sirf Tumhari		In Hindi	
2018	The Journey of Karma	Karma D'souza	In Hindi	
2019	Love in a Taxi	Herself	In Hindi	
2020	Touch the Fire	Poonam Pandey	In Hindi	

=== Television ===
Year	Title	Role	Notes
2008	CID	Natasha	Season 1 Episode 506
2011	Fear Factor: Khatron Ke Khiladi 4	Contestant	11th place
2013	SuperCops Vs Super Villains	Menaka/Shreya, Natasha	
2015	Total Nadaniyaan	Jalebi Bai	
2015	Pyaar Mohabbat Ssshhh	Jalebi Bai	
2022	Lock Upp	Contestant	7th place

=== Web series ===
Year	Title	Role	Notes	Ref.
2023	Honeymoon Suite Room No. 911		ALTBalaji	
