= All Indian Cine Workers Association =

Indian non-profit

AICWA
- All indian Cine Workers Association
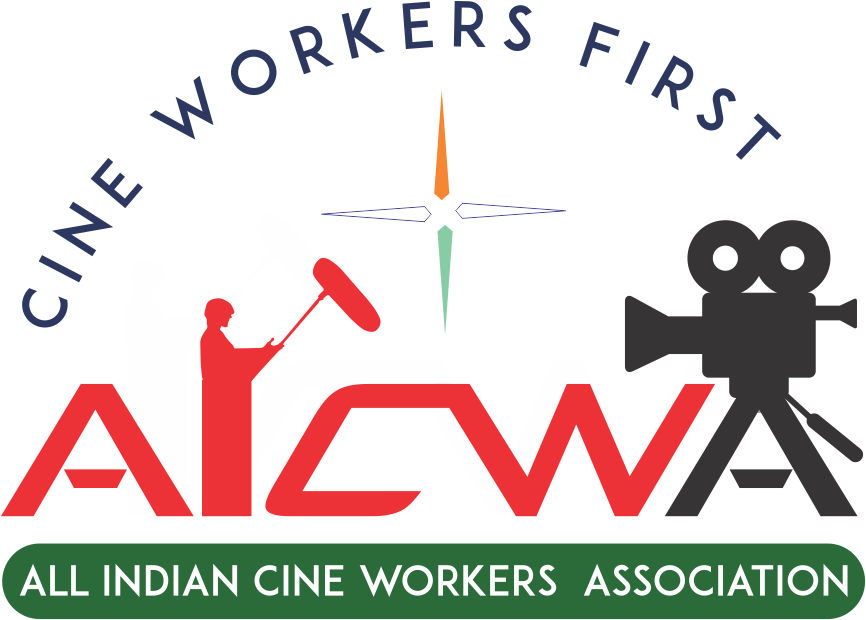
- Founder: Suresh Shyamlal Gupta (President)
- Type: Nonprofit
- Headquarters: 5, Sunheights Building, Suncity Complex, Near Shyamlal Sohanlal Gupta Chowk, JVLR, Powai, Mumbai, Maharashtra - 400076
- Location: India
- Website: www.aicwa.in

All Indian Cine Workers Association (AICWA) is a non-profit organization registered at Mumbai. Founded by Suresh Shyamlal Gupta. AICWA works for security and safety of cine workers and artists of Indian film industry. It was formed for the betterment of workers and artists in the Indian film industry & giving them a platform for resolution of their grievances. It is affiliated with Government of Maharashtra.

== Organization ==
All Indian Cine Workers Association (AICWA) is an Organized Non-Government workers union for the Indian Film Industry. AICWA made a revolution by organizing a meeting with labor ministry and forming a government committee in which AICWA is a committee member and representing workers and Artists working in the Indian Film Industry. AICWA is one of the leading and specialized associations working for the betterment of artists and workers in the Indian film industry. Its president Suresh Shyamlal Gupta is a committee member of labor, Energy, and Industries in the government of Maharashtra. AICWA banned Pakistani artists from Indian films during the Pulwama Terror attack.

Backing up the same, the organization has pleaded for a relief fund from Maharashtra govt seeking financial help for cine workers ruled out of their work during COVID-19 pandemic. Moreover, AICWA has raised a demand for Cine Workers Welfare Fund by making a representation to Nana Patole, the Speaker of the Maharashtra Assembly. The same was put forth to Chief Minister Uddhav Thackeray for the grant.

AICWA has presence in Maharashtra, Uttar Pradesh, Rajasthan, Uttarakhand, Haryana, Punjab, Madhya Pradesh, Gujarat and Jammu & Kashmir with active members from all over the country. It is headquartered in Mumbai, Maharashtra, with around 15 active offices in other states. Key people of AICWA is affiliated with the Government of Maharashtra as officially appointed representative of Cine-Television artists and workers.

During the First wave of COVID-19 pandemic, an essential step was taken by AICWA president Suresh Shyamlal Gupta, he wrote a letter to Maharashtra Chief Minister Uddhav Thackeray seeking financial help for the workers of Film industry, while a nation-wide lockdown was imposed to fight against the COVID-19. Film workers needed financial support for livelihood, few film stars, and directors had tried helping them but it was not enough so AICWA requested the state government to pay Rs. 5000 to each family on a monthly basis to sustain their livelihood.

== Objectives ==
- All Indian Cine Workers Association (AICWA) standards are broadly aimed at ensuring accessible, productive, and sustainable work conditions with a focus on security and dignity for cine workers and artists.
- To make this unorganized sector (film industry) into an organized setup where the worker's interests are the priority & due diligence is placed to achieve the same.
- To set up a Standard Operating Procedure (SOP) for the day-to-day working of the Organization ensuring timely & responsible solutions to problems of cine workers.
- To secure the speedy improvement of conditions of work and life and of the status of the workers in industry and society.
- Working to enhance the Social and Economic conditions of the workers.
- Providing Legal and Social Assistance to artists and workers in Cinema as well as the TV industry.
- Actively engaged with state governments for providing sustainable services to cinema and TV industry workers and artists.
- Conducting stress management sessions.
- Formulated a committee against women/child harassment.
- Helping government formulate laws for Minimum Working Hours, Minimum wages act, Provident Fund, ESIC, Life insurance & Mediclaim, Safety & Security for cine artists and workers.
- To promote and work on a Pan India level by forming Regional Offices for timely resolution of issues.
- To foster the spirit of solidarity, service, brotherhood, cooperation, and mutual help among the workers.
- To develop a sense of responsibility towards the industry and community.
- To raise the worker's morale by creating good working conditions.

== Controversies ==
- During the First wave of the COVID-19 Pandemic while full lockdown was imposed as per government guideline and all shooting was also stopped from 19 to 31 March 2020. AICWA president Suresh Shyamlal Gupta noted actually a few shooting was still not stopped as well as safety instructions were also not followed. Only 50 percent of the shooting was stopped at Goregaon Film City and the rest still continued without following safety guidelines. A notification was issued from Principal Secretary of the Health Department Dr. Pradeep Vyas that must follow safety hygiene while shooting still all the safety hygiene was neglected.
- In 2018, Cine Vista Studio's management faced rage from AICWA as one crew member lost his life due to negligence on the part of the studio owners, the production house, and the producer. "Although a huge quantity of wood was used on the set, they had not adopted safety measures. Many union members have complained about it," said Gupta. Later a notice was served to Cine Vista regarding the same.
- AICWA lodged a complaint at Chembur Police station on 11 July 2018 against over-the-top media services provider Netflix, Nawazuddin Siddiqui and the producers of the new series Sacred Games for insulting the late Prime Minister Rajiv Gandhi. Highlighting the incident, Suresh Shyamlal Gupta stated, "I would like to draw your attention towards a serial called 'Sacred Games' which has started on Netflix contains a scene from the fourth episode in which the lead actor Nawazuddin Siddiqui is seen abusing our Rajiv Gandhi by calling him 'fattu' (p**** as translated in the subtitle of the show)."
- After the 2019 Pulwama attack All Indian Cine Workers Association announced a ban on all Pakistani actors and artists in the Indian film industry, and stated that strong action would be taken on any organization violating this resolution.
- AICWA demanded a ban on Pakistani artists, diplomats & bilateral relations by writing a formal request to Hon'ble Prime Minister of India Narendra Modi. The association issued a statement, "AICWA demands a complete No on Pakistani artists, diplomats and no bilateral relations with Pakistan and its people." President of the association appreciated bold decisions of Home Minister Amit Shah and Prime Minister Narendra Modi.
- All Indian Cine Workers Association (AICWA) on 19 February wrote a letter to the Minister of External Affairs, Sushma Swaraj, asking for Pakistani artists to be deported and their visas canceled following the Pulwama terror attack. AICWA said that the attack was a "cowardly, shameful and most disgraceful act of Pakistan." The association stated that 'Nation Comes First' and claimed to stand with the nation in times of such terrifying and inhuman acts. It further declared a ban on Pak artists after the Pulwama incident and pleaded the Centre to cancel the work visas of all Pakistani artists.
- All Indian Cine Workers Association (AICWA) announced a complete ban on Pakistani artists and singers after the Pakistan-based Pulwama terrorist attack in Jammu and Kashmir. Sheikh Latif, a Pakistani citizen, moved to the Lahore High Court on seeking a complete ban on trade and exhibition of Indian films in Pakistan.
- On 8 August 2019, AICWA demanded blanket ban on Pakistani Artists, diplomats after Pakistan banned screening of Indian films across border. "Entire film industry and cine workers have refused to resume work till there is a complete ban of Pakistani movie makers, artists, and trade partner," the statement by AICWA reads.
- AICWA banned and boycotted Mika Singh from the film industry after Singh performed at a wedding in Pakistan. Members of association protested outside Mika Singh House after he performed at an event in Pakistan at a former dictator General Pervez Musharraf's relatives function. As per the statement, "AICWA workers will make sure that no one in India works with Mika Singh and if anyone does, they will face legal consequences in the court of law". AICWA also requested Ministry of Information and Broadcasting’s intervention in this regard.
- AICWA demanded ban on Punjabi film Chal Mera Putt for casting Pakistani artists. In this regard, the association has sent a formal letter to the Captain Amarinder Singh, CM of Punjab. A copy of the same was also forwarded to the Hon Shri Prakash Javadekar (Minister of Information & Broadcasting), Hon Shri Subrahmanyam Jaishankar (former Minister Of External Affairs) and Hon Shri Prasoon Joshi (Chairman, Central Board of Film Certification) for their kind perusal.
- After Yogi Adityanath announced a new film city in UP, AICWA's president said, "By the way, shooting of many films is going on in Lucknow. It is possible sometimes but not many films will be shot. Women feel safe in Mumbai. There are around 30 percent women associated with film industry in Mumbai. I doubt if the freedom to work day and night be available to them there?"
- Suresh Shyamlal Gupta, President of All Indian Cine Workers Association raised the issues related to the wages of the workers. Raised voice to stop increasing cases of mental stress and suicide due to non-payment of wages and work to laborers during the lockdown.
- All Indian Cine Workers Association (AICWA) Union has demanded an SIT probe into the suicide of noted art director Raju Sapte. On their demand, the matter was raised in the Maharashtra Legislative Assembly in which a meeting was held under the leadership of Home Minister Dilip Walse-Patil and State Home Minister Satej Patil, and orders were issued to take strict action against the culprits. In this case, Suresh Shyamlal Gupta, President of All Indian Cine Workers Association, submitted a letter to the Government of Maharashtra, highlighting the association of the named accused with the Federation.
