= Beauty and the Beast (1987 film) =

- Movie Poster
- Directed by: Eugene Marner
- Written by: Jeanne-Marie Leprince de Beaumont (novel); Carole Lucia Satrina (screenplay)
- Based on: Beauty and the Beast by Gabrielle-Suzanne Barbot de Villeneuve and Jeanne-Marie Le Prince de Beaumont
- Produced by: Yoram Globus; Menahem Golan
- Starring: John Savage; Rebecca De Mornay; Yossi Graber; Michael Schneider; Carmela Marner
- Cinematography: Avraham Karpick
- Edited by: Tova Asher
- Music by: Lori McKelvey
- Production company: Golan-Globus Productions
- Distributed by: The Cannon Group
- Release date: April 1987 (USA)
- Running time: 94 minutes
- Country: Israel
- Language: English

Beauty and the Beast (alternatively: Cannon Movie Tales: Beauty and the Beast) is a 1987 English-language Israeli musical film, part of the 1980s film series Cannon Movie Tales. It is a contemporary adaptation of the classic tale of Beauty and the Beast by Jeanne-Marie Leprince de Beaumont, borrowing elements from Villeneuve's version, such as the dream sequences. The film was shot entirely in Israel, and the taglines were: "The monster they feared was the prince she loved" and "The classic fairy tale about seeing with your heart".

== Plot ==
A wealthy merchant lives an affluent life with his two sons, Oliver and Frederick, and three daughters, Bettina, Isabella and Beauty. Beauty, the youngest daughter, is the caretaker of her family; without her, none of the family can look after themselves, and she is constantly taking care of her siblings. Despite this, Beauty is not frustrated, but she wonders what she would do with her life if she did not devote it to her family.

After the merchant loses his wealth in a storm at sea, the family must renounce their luxurious life and move to the countryside, with Beauty once again taking charge. After a time, the family hear that their wealth may be returned, for a ship has made it to port. To celebrate, the father promises his children gifts of luxury, but Beauty merely wants a rose. The merchant realizes it was a lost cause, for he is still as poor as he was when he left, and returns. He stops off at a beautiful castle where an unseen host treats him to good food and shelter. However, the old man plucks a rose from the garden, and the Beast, the formerly unseen host, demands that as punishment, Beauty must come to live with him. When Beauty's father takes her to the castle, the Beast gives him two chests of gold and horses to carry it, as compensation for giving up his daughter. Beauty is alone for the first time in her life. Therefore, she realizes what she wants to do with her life, and realizes that the Beast is not a complete monster.

It seems that while in the castle anything she wants magically appears. The Beast has magical powers and grants all her wishes. The only time they see each other is at dinner. He holds a rose and each night asks, "Do you love me? Will you marry me?". She always replies "No." Every night she dreams of a prince whom she loves, despite it being only a dream. She is shocked when she finds a painting of the prince in Beast's castle.

Over time, Beauty is happy at the castle, but asks the Beast if she can visit her family, as she misses them. He allows her and says "be back in one month, or I will die". Also time flows differently. In the castle it has been about a week, but to the outside world it has been a year. While with her family they learn how to care for themselves instead of Beauty having to take care of them. She thinks about Beast and has to return, against her family's urging her to stay.

Upon returning to the castle Beauty finds Beast dying for her lateness. She cries and mourns, begging Beast not to die. That's when she realizes how much she cares for him. So he asks again "will you marry me" she finally says "yes". That breaks the curse and Beast heals. He also turns into the prince she been dreaming about. He tells her about the curse. All his former subjects reappear along with her family who can now visit her whenever they want. She and the prince wed, and she becomes his princess.

== Cast ==
- John Savage as Beast/Prince
- Rebecca De Mornay as Beauty
- Yossi Graber as Father
- Michael Schneider as Kuppel
- Carmela Marner as Bettina
- Ruth Harlap as Isabella
- Joseph Bee as Oliver
- Jack Messinger as Frederick
- Tzipi Mor as 1st Maid
- Firat Kanter as 2nd Maid
- Ya'ackov Ben-Sira as Bailiff (as Yaacov Ben-Sira)
- Rafi Goldvasser as Acrobat/Juggler
- Eduardo Hobshar as Acrobat/Juggler
- Nitzan Sitzer as Acrobat/Juggler
- Eran Lavy as Acrobat/Juggler
- Deborah Sherph as Innkeeper
- Amiram Atias as Statue

== Soundtrack ==
- "Without Us"

Music and Lyrics by Lori McKelvey
Performed by Rebecca De Mornay, Carmela Marner, Ruth Harlap, Jack Messinger and Nick Curtis

- "This Life Is for Me"

Music and Lyrics by Lori McKelvey
Performed by George Little

- "If You See with Your Heart"

Music and Lyrics by Lori McKelvey
Performed by Rebecca De Mornay and John Savage

- "Wish for the Moon"

Music and Lyrics by Lori McKelvey
Performed by Rebecca De Mornay and John Savage
