= Beauty and the Beast =

French fairy tale

"Beauty and the Beast" (La Belle et la Bête)
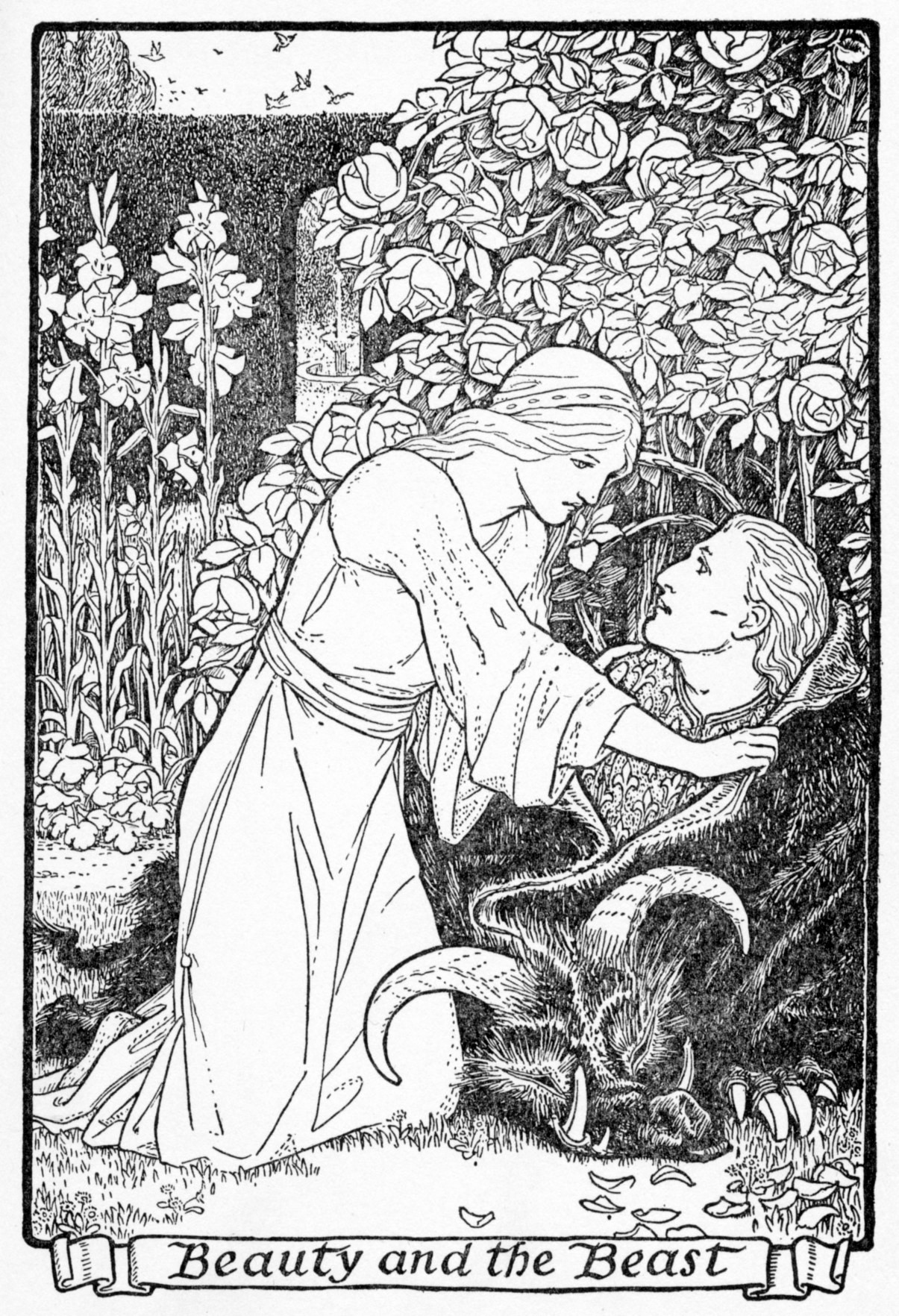
- Beauty releases the prince from his beastly curse. Artwork from Europa's Fairy Book, by John Batten.

Folk tale
- Name: "Beauty and the Beast" (La Belle et la Bête)
- Also known as: French: La Belle et la Bête Italian: La Bella e la Bestia Latin: Bellă et Bēstia or Fōrmōsa et Bēstia Spanish: La Bella y la Bestia Portuguese: A Bela e o Monstro (in Portugal), A Bela e a Fera (in Brazil), or A Bela e a Besta (in literal Portuguese) German: Die Schöne und das Biest Dutch: Belle en het Beest or De Schone en het Beest
- Aarne–Thompson grouping: ATU 425C (Beauty and the Beast)
- Region: France
- Published in: La Jeune Américaine et les contes marins (1740), by Gabrielle-Suzanne Barbot de Villeneuve; Magasin des enfants (1756), by Jeanne-Marie Leprince de Beaumont
- Related: Cupid and Psyche (ATU 425B) East of the Sun and West of the Moon (ATU 425A)

"Beauty and the Beast" is a fairy tale written by the French novelist Gabrielle-Suzanne Barbot de Villeneuve and published anonymously in 1740 in La Jeune Américaine et les contes marins (The Young American and Marine Tales).

Villeneuve's original story was abridged, revised, and published by French novelist Jeanne-Marie Leprince de Beaumont in 1756 in Magasin des enfants (Children's Collection) which became the most commonly retold version. Later, Andrew Lang retold the story in Blue Fairy Book, a part of the Fairy Book series, in 1889. The fairy-tale was influenced by the story of Petrus Gonsalvus as well as Ancient Latin stories such as "Cupid and Psyche" from The Golden Ass, written by Lucius Apuleius Madaurensis in the second century AD, and "The Pig King", an Italian fairy-tale published by Giovanni Francesco Straparola in The Facetious Nights of Straparola around 1550.

Variants of the tale are known across Europe. In France, for example, Zémire and Azor is an operatic version of the story, written by Jean-François Marmontel and composed by André Grétry in 1771, which had enormous success into the 19th century. Zémire and Azor is based on the second version of the tale. Amour pour amour (Love for Love) by Pierre-Claude Nivelle de La Chaussée is a 1742 play based on de Villeneuve's version. According to researchers at a university in Lisbon, the historical antecedents of these stories originated about 4,000 years ago.

== Plot ==
=== Villeneuve's original version ===
==== Chapter 1: There Was Once a Merchant ====
A widowed merchant lives in a mansion in a city with his twelve children: six sons and six daughters. All his daughters are very beautiful, but the youngest, Beauty, is the loveliest. Beauty is also kind and pure of heart; her elder sisters, in contrast, are cruel, selfish, and jealous of Beauty.

The merchant and his children become poor when their house burns down, and his trading ships are lost to storms or pirates. The family of thirteen is forced to move to a small cottage in the countryside and must work on a farm. While Beauty adjusts to country life with a cheerful disposition, her sisters don't and become more jealous of Beauty when neighbours come by to see her.

Two years later, the merchant hears that one of his ships has returned. Before leaving to retrieve it, he asks his children what gifts they want him to bring back for them. His oldest daughters want expensive clothes and jewellery, while Beauty asks for a rose.

When he arrives at the port six months later, the merchant is dismayed to learn that his colleagues, believing him to have died in the fire, have already sold the cargo and left him unable to buy his daughters' presents. During his trip back home, the merchant becomes lost in a vicious snowstorm and he takes shelter in a hollow tree.

==== Chapter 2: The Palace of the Beast ====
The day after the snowstorm, the merchant arrives at a palace surrounded by lifelike statues. Seeing that no one is home, the merchant sneaks in and finds tables inside laden with food and drink, which seem to have been left for him by his host. The merchant accepts this gift and spends the night there.

The next morning, the merchant is about to leave when he sees a bush of roses and remembers to give Beauty one. The merchant plucks one rose and is then confronted by his host: a hideous "Beast" with hard scales and an elephant-like trunk who threatens to punish the merchant for stealing the rose. The merchant begs for his life, explaining the promise he had made to his youngest daughter. The Beast agrees to let the merchant go home, but only if he brings one of his daughters back to live with the Beast instead. The merchant is upset, but agrees to the bargain.

The following morning, a winged horse takes the merchant home to his children. The merchant hands Beauty her rose and explains to all his children his deal with the Beast. The merchant's sons vow to kill the Beast but he forbids them from doing so, and his eldest daughters urge Beauty to go to the Beast's palace because she had requested the rose. Beauty willingly agrees to go to the Beast, moving her father who remembers a Romani fortune-teller's prophecy about his youngest daughter making his household lucky.

A month later, a flying horse takes Beauty and her father to the Beast's palace. Upon arrival, Beauty is greeted with a fireworks show.

==== Chapter 3: Beauty Meets the Beast ====
Beauty meets the Beast and is scared of him at first. The Beast allows father and daughter one final night together and orders the merchant to leave the next morning and never return. Beauty helps her father fill trunks with gifts for her siblings.

The following morning, two winged horses take the merchant and the trunk of gifts away, leaving Beauty with the Beast. That night, Beauty dreams she is in a garden where she meets a handsome young man, "the Unknown", who professes his love for her; a lady also appears and warns Beauty not to be deceived by appearances.

Beauty wakes up and explores the rooms in the Beast's palace. She finds a bracelet with the Unknown's face on it and a full-size portrait of him. That night at supper, the Beast appears and asks Beauty to let him sleep with her,, but lets her respond with a yes or a no. Shocked by the Beast's request, Beauty says no and when she dreams of the Unknown, he is sad.

==== Chapter 4: Beauty Explores the Palace ====
For several months, Beauty lives a life of luxury at the Beast's palace. To pass the time, Beauty explores more rooms, each giving her new delights and gifts; she even finds tamed songbirds, talking parrots, and monkeys, who all become her friends, plus a special room whose windows project plays and operas.

Every night, the Beast asks Beauty to let him sleep with her and she always says no; and every time Beauty sleeps, she dreams of the Unknown whom she has fallen for. Ever since meeting the two, Beauty has become conflicted about her gratitude to the Beast and her love for the Unknown.

One night at supper, Beauty is sad and when the Beast asks her what is wrong, she pleads homesickness and he sadly allows her to leave, warning her to return to the palace in two months. Beauty agrees to this and is presented with an enchanted ring, which allows her to wake up in her family's home in an instant.

==== Chapter 5: Beauty Returns Home ====
Beauty wakes up in her family's new house. The merchant and his sons are happy to see her again, while her sisters aren't. When Beauty tells her father of her dreams and the Beast's nightly proposal, he persuades her to let the Beast sleep with her and to heed the lady's warning. Throughout the two months, Beauty doesn't dream of the Unknown.

The five older sisters become more jealous of Beauty when their suitors abandon them and start courting her instead; Beauty tries to persuade her unwanted suitors to leave her, but to no avail. When the two months expire, Beauty's father and brothers beg her to stay with them a little longer, and she reluctantly breaks her promise to the Beast.

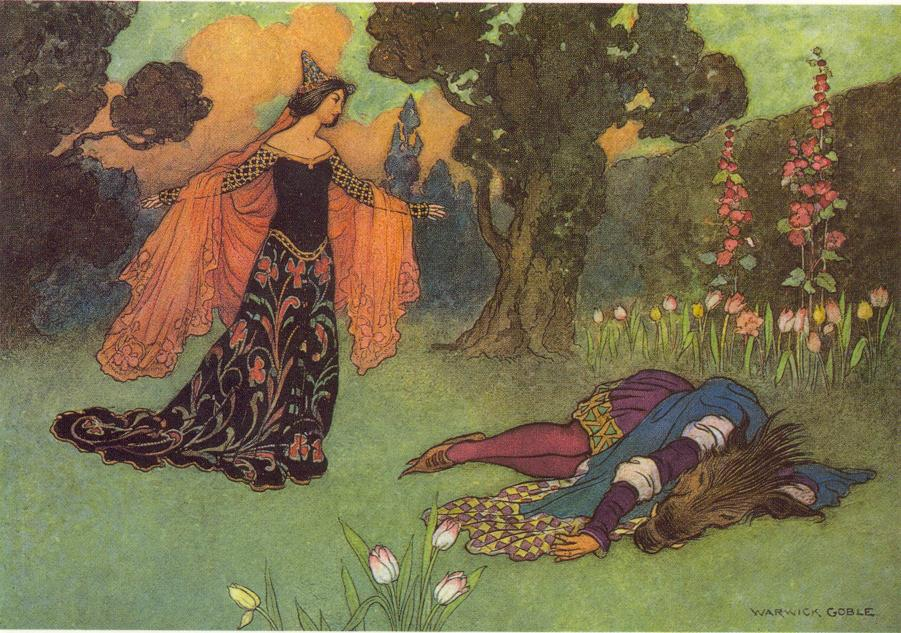
Illustration by Warwick Goble.

That night, she dreams of the Beast dying alone on the palace grounds and hastens to return despite her brothers' resolve to prevent her from doing so.

Once she is back in the palace, Beauty's fears are confirmed when she finds the Beast near death in a cave on the grounds. Seeing this, Beauty is distraught, realising that she loves him. With some monkeys' help, Beauty fetches water from a nearby spring, which she uses to resuscitate the Beast.

The next night when the Beast proposes, Beauty agrees. The sky is lit up by a magical fireworks show. That night, the Beast falls asleep beside Beauty.

==== Chapter 6: Beauty Meets the Prince ====
When Beauty dreams of the Unknown again, he and the lady tell her that all will be revealed when she wakes up.

In the morning, Beauty finds that the Beast has transformed into the Unknown, revealing they are the same person. Beauty is then visited by a Queen and the dream lady who is a Fairy who arrive in a chariot drawn by white stags. The Fairy explains to Beauty that the Unknown is a Prince, whose mother is displeased that her son has become engaged to a merchant's daughter and not a princess. When the Prince wakes up, the Fairy reveals that Beauty is indeed a princess: the daughter of the Queen's brother, the King of the Fortunate Island and the Fairy's sister. The Queen apologises to Beauty and she and the Fairy leaves the couple.

==== Chapter 7: The Beast's Story ====
The Prince tells Beauty the story of his life and how he became a Beast. The Prince explains that his father died before the Prince was born, and his mother had to fight an enemy to defend the kingdom. The Queen left the Prince in the care of his evil fairy godmother, who tried to seduce him when he turned fifteen and helped his mother win the war.

When the war ended, the evil fairy godmother accompanied the Queen and the Prince back to the palace and asked him to marry her. But the Prince refused and the Queen considered her too old. The evil fairy godmother, in a rage, transformed the Prince into an ugly beast in front of his shocked mother. Before leaving mother and son, the evil fairy godmother warned them that only a maiden's act of true love could break the spell and that if anyone else beside the Queen knew about it, the Prince would be a Beast forever.

After the Prince's evil fairy godmother left, the good fairy arrived to help him by turning the palace's servants to stone to prevent them from revealing the curse to outsiders, and promising to protect his mother from the evil fairy. The good fairy also summoned her genie servants to keep the Prince company while he waited for Beauty's arrival.

At the end of his story, the Prince reveals to Beauty that her animal friends are the genie servants, and that the good fairy had arranged for her to see the Prince's true self in dreams.

==== Chapter 8: The Fairy Reveals All ====
The Good Fairy then summons the King of the Fortunate Island to meet Beauty, and having reunited the royal family, brings the petrified servants back to life.

The Good Fairy then tells how her sister disguised herself as a shepherdess to marry the King of the Fortunate Island with whom she has one child: Beauty. Shortly after the Princess was born, her mother and aunt attended a Fairies' meeting with the Fairy Queen in Fairyland. The Queen of the Fortunate Island was imprisoned for breaking the law that bans non-Elder Fairies (fairies below the age of 1,000 years) from marrying and having children with humans. Testifying against the young Queen was the Prince's evil godmother, who herself is an Elder, and another Elder Fairy cursed Beauty to marry a Beast.

Back on the Fortunate Island, the people had faked their imprisoned Queen's death after they were unable to find her. The Evil Fairy then plotted to marry the King of the Fortunate Island. She became the Princess's governess and hired a greedy couple to kill the little girl. But the Good Fairy, then 990 years old, rescued her niece by mastering the Terrible Act, a spell that allows Elder Fairies to change their forms. Turning herself into a bear, the Good Fairy slew the would-be killers and carried her niece away.

When the King of the Fortunate Island believed both his wife and daughter to be dead, he banished the Evil Fairy who would later curse her godson.

The Good Fairy then brought her niece to a cottage wherein slept three nursesmaids and a sickly little girl the same age as the Princess. The sick child had been sent to the countryside by her father, the merchant, in hopes that the fresh air would cure her. When the merchant's youngest daughter died, the Good Fairy secretly swapped the two girls and buried the dead child.

Unaware she wasn't their master's child, the three nursemaids soon returned to the city with the Princess. The Good Fairy followed the nurses to the merchant's mansion, disguised herself as a Romani fortune-teller and told him the prophecy of "his" youngest child bringing luck to his household. She also decreed that the baby be named "Beauty."

The Good Fairy later arranged for Beauty and the Prince to meet, the young couple's love both breaking the Evil Fairy's spell and fulfilling the Princess's destiny to marry a Beast. She also testified against the Evil Fairy, who had now been imprisoned for her crimes.

==== Chapter 9: A Happy Ending ====
After the Good Fairy finishes her story, her sister arrives at the palace, having been freed by the Fairy Queen. With the entire Royal Family reunited, Beauty's aunt summons the merchant and his family. Beauty's surrogate family members are told the whole truth and are made members of her court.

Beauty marries the Prince and they live for many years because of the powers of the Princess's Fairy mother and aunt.

The Prince's mother commands the story to be recorded in the imperial archives so everyone might know the tale of Beauty and the Beast.

=== Beaumont's version ===
Beaumont greatly pared down the cast of characters and pruned the tale to an almost archetypal simplicity. The story begins in much the same way as Villeneuve's version, although now the merchant has only six children: three sons and three daughters, including Beauty. Unlike Villeneuve's version, Beaumont's version treats the merchant as Beauty's biological father and there is no indication of her being royalty by birth. The circumstances leading to her arrival at the Beast's castle unfold in a similar manner, but on this arrival, Beauty is informed that she is a mistress and he will obey her. Beauty still dreams of the fairy, but not the handsome stranger, and there are no other inhabitants of the castle besides herself and the Beast. Beaumont strips most of the lavish descriptions present in Beauty's exploration of the palace and quickly jumps to her return home. She is given leave to remain there for a week, and when she arrives, her sisters feign fondness to entice her to remain another week in hopes that the Beast will devour her in anger. Again, she returns to him dying and restores his life. The two then marry and live happily ever after. The entire third act of Villeneuve's version detailing the backstories of both the Beast and Beauty is eliminated completely, with the Beast simply mentioning that he was cursed by a wicked fairy. The Fairy from Beauty's dream still appears, but in this version turns Beauty's sisters into statues as punishment for their wickedness.

=== Lang's version ===
A variant of Villeneuve's version appears in Andrew Lang's The Blue Fairy Book. The Merchant's mansion is burned in a fire, along with his belongings, forcing him and his family to move to their country home in the forest. His ships are lost at sea, captured by pirates, etc., except one, which returns later. Unlike the other two versions, the sisters in Lang's story are not jealous of Beauty. Also, Lang maintained the lavish descriptions of the Beast's palace. This version in particular is one of the most commonly told, along with those of Villeneuve and Beaumont.

This version was written between 1889 and 1913, some time after the original version, so it should be considered as a later version of the story. The Beast was described in this story to have the face of a bear or a wolf, the mane of a lion, the horns of a ram, the trunk of an elephant, and the hands of a human.

== Analysis ==
The tale is classified in the Aarne–Thompson–Uther Index as type ATU 425C, "Beauty and the Beast". It is related to the general type ATU 425, "The Search for the Lost Husband" and subtypes.

In a study about the myth of Cupid and Psyche, Danish folklorist Inger Margrethe Boberg argued that "Beauty and the Beast" was "an older form" of the animal husband narrative, and that subtypes 425A, "Animal as Bridegroom", and 425B, "The Disenchanted Husband: The Witch's Tasks", were secondary developments, with motifs incorporated into the narrative.

== Variants ==
=== Europe ===
==== France ====
Emmanuel Cosquin collected a version with a tragic ending from Lorraine titled The White Wolf (Le Loup blanc), in which the youngest daughter asks her father to bring her a singing rose when he returns. The man cannot find a singing rose for his youngest daughter, and he refuses to return home until he finds one. When he finally finds singing roses, they are in the castle of the titular white wolf, who initially wants to kill him for daring to steal his roses, but, upon hearing about his daughters, changes his mind and agrees to spare him his life under the condition he must give him the first living being that greets him when he returns home (note story of Jephthah and his daughter in Judges 11). This turns out to be his youngest daughter. In the castle, the girl discovers that the white wolf is enchanted and can turn into a human at night, but she must not tell anyone about it. Unfortunately, the girl is later visited by her two elder sisters who pressure her to tell them what is happening. When she finally does, the castle crumbles and the wolf dies.

Henri Pourrat collected a version from Auvergne in south-central France, titled Belle Rose (sometimes translated in English as Lovely Rose). In this version, the heroine and her sisters are the daughters of a poor peasant and are named after flowers, the protagonist being Rose and her sisters Marguerite (Daisy) and Julianne, respectively. The Beast is described as having a mastiff jaw, a lizard's back legs, and a salamander's body. The ending is closer to Villeneuve's and Beaumont's versions with Rose rushing back to the castle and finding the Beast lying dying beside a fountain. When the Beast asks if she knows that he can't live without her, Rose answers yes, and the Beast turns into a human. He explains to Rose that he was a prince cursed for mocking a beggar and could only be disenchanted by a poor but kind-hearted maiden. Unlike in Beaumont's version, it is not mentioned that the protagonist's sisters are punished at the end.

==== Italy ====
According to philologist Gianfranco D'Aronco and scholar Renato Aprile, the tale is popular in the Italian oral tradition. Christian Schneller collected a variant from Trentino titled The Singing, Dancing and Music-making Leaf (German: Vom singenden, tanzenden und musicirenden Blatte; Italian: La foglia, che canta, che balla e che suona) in which the Beast takes the form of a snake. Instead of going to visit her family alone, the heroine can only go to her sister's wedding if she agrees to let the snake go with her. During the wedding, they dance together, and when the girl kicks the snake's tail, he turns into a beautiful youth, who is the son of a count.

Sicilian folklorist Giuseppe Pitrè collected a variant from Palermo titled Rusina 'Mperatrici (The Empress Rosina). Domenico Comparetti included a variant from Montale titled Bellindia, in which Bellindia is the heroine's name, while her two eldest sisters are called Carolina and Assunta. Vittorio Imbriani included a version titled Zelinda and the Monster (Zelinda e il Mostro), in which the heroine, called Zelinda, asks for a rose in January. Instead of going to visit her family, staying longer than she promised, and then returning to the Monster's castle to find him dying on the ground, here the Monster shows Zelinda her father dying on a magic mirror and says the only way she can save him is saying that she loves him. Zelinda does as asked, and the Monster turns into a human, who tells her he is the son of the King of the Oranges. Both Comparetti's and Imbriani's versions were included in Sessanta novelle popolari montalesi by Gherardo Nerucci.

British folklorist Rachel Harriette Busk collected a version from Rome titled The Enchanted Rose-Tree where the heroine does not have any sisters. Antonio De Nino collected a variant from Abruzzo, in eastern Italy, that he also titled Bellindia, in which instead of a rose, the heroine asks for a golden carnation. Instead of a seeing it on a magic mirror, or knowing about it because the Beast tells her, here Bellinda knows what happens in her father's house because in the garden there is a tree called the Tree of Weeping and Laughter, whose leaves turn upwards when there is joy in her family, and they drop when there is sorrow.

Francesco Mango collected a Sardinian version titled The Bear and the Three Sisters (S'urzu i is tres sorris), in which the Beast has the form of a bear.

Italo Calvino included a version on Italian Folktales titled Bellinda and the Monster, inspired mostly from Comparetti's version, but adding some elements from De Nino's, like the Tree of Weeping and Laughter.

==== Iberian Peninsula ====
===== Spain =====
Manuel Milá y Fontanals collected a version titled The King's Son, Disenchanted (El hijo del rey, desencantado). In this tale, when the father asks his three daughters what they want, the youngest asks for the hand of the king's son, and everybody thinks she is haughty for wanting such a thing. The father orders his servants to kill her, but they spare her and she hides in the woods. There, she meets a wolf that brings her to a castle and takes her in. The girl learns that in order to break his spell, she must kill the wolf and throw his body into the fire after opening it. From the body flies a pigeon, and from the pigeon an egg. When the girl breaks the egg, the king's son comes out. Francisco Maspons y Labrós extended and translated the tale to Catalan, and included it in the second volume of Lo Rondallayre.

Maspons y Labrós collected a variant from Catalonia titled Lo trist. In this version, instead of roses, the youngest daughter asks for a coral necklace. Whenever one of her family members is sick, the heroine is warned by the garden (a spring with muddy waters; a tree with withered leaves). When she visits her family, she is warned that she must return to the castle if she hears a bell ringing. After her third visit to her family, the heroine returns to the garden where she finds her favorite rosebush withered. When she plucks a rose, the beast appears and turns into a beautiful youth.

A version from Extremadura, titled The Bear Prince (El príncipe oso), was collected by Sergio Hernández de Soto and shows a similar introduction as in Beaumont's and Villeneuve's versions: the heroine's father loses his fortune after a shipwreck. When the merchant has the chance to recover his wealth, he asks his daughters what gift they want from his travels. The heroine asks for a lily. When the merchant finds a lily, a bear appears, saying that his youngest daughter must come to the garden because only she can repair the damage the merchant has caused. His youngest daughter seeks the bear and finds him lying on the ground, wounded. The only way to heal him is by restoring the lily the father took, and when the girl restores it, the bear turns into a prince. This tale was translated to English by Elsie Spicer Eells and retitled The Lily and the Bear.

Aurelio Macedonio Espinosa Sr. collected a version from Almenar de Soria titled The Beast of the Rose Bush (La fiera del rosal), in which the heroine is the daughter of a king instead of a merchant.

Aurelio Macedonio Espinosa Jr. published a version from Sepúlveda, Segovia titled The Beast of the Garden (La fiera del jardín). In this version, the heroine has a stepmother and two stepsisters and asks for an unspecified white flower.

Beauty and the Beast in the Basque language is called Ederra eta Piztia.

===== Portugal =====
In a Portuguese version collected by Zófimo Consiglieri Pedroso, the heroine asks for "a slice of roach off a green meadow". The father finally finds a slice of roach off a green meadow in a castle that appears to be uninhabited, but he hears a voice saying he must bring his youngest daughter to the palace. While the heroine is at the palace, the same unseen voice informs her of the goings-on at her father's house using birds as messengers. When the heroine visits her family, the master of the castle sends a horse to let her know it is time to return. The heroine must go after hearing him three times. The third time she goes to visit her family, her father dies. After the funeral, she's tired and oversleeps, missing the horse's neigh repeat three times before it leaves. When she finally returns to the castle, she finds the beast dying. With his last breath, he curses her and her entire family. The heroine dies a few days after, and her sisters spend the rest of their lives in poverty.

Another Portuguese version from Ourilhe, collected by: Francisco Adolfo Coelho and titled A Bella-menina, is closer to Beaumont's tale in its happy ending – the beast is revived and disenchanted.

==== Belgium and the Netherlands ====
Beauty and the Beast in the Standard Dutch language is De Schone en het Beest (literally "The Beauty and the Beast"), but it is usually called Belle en het Beest (literally "Belle and the Beast").

In a Flemish version from Veurne titled Roosken zonder Doornen or Rose without Thorns, the prince is disenchanted differently than in Beaumont's and Villeneuve's versions. The heroine and the monster attend each of the weddings of the heroine's elder sisters, and to break the spell, the heroine has to give a toast for the beast. In the first wedding, the heroine forgets, but in the second she remembers, and the beast becomes human.

In a second Flemish variant collected by Amaat Joos, titled Van het Schoon Kind, the heroine's father is a king instead of a merchant, and when he asks his three daughters what they want him to bring them when he returns from a long journey, the king's youngest daughter asks for a bush of trembling roses while her two eldest sisters asks for robes with golden flowers and a silver skirt. During her stay at the monster's castle the princess has a nightmare where she sees the monster drowning in a pond, and after she wakes up and finds out the monster is not in the corner where he sleeps, she goes to the garden where she finds the monster in the same situation she saw him in her dream. The monster turns into a prince after the princess saves him.

Another Flemish version from Wuustwezel, collected by Victor de Meyere, is closer to Beaumont's plot, the merchant's youngest daughter staying one day more at her family's home and soon returning to the Beast's palace. When she returns, she fears something bad has happened to him. This one is one of the few versions in which the merchant accompanies his daughter back to the Beast's castle.

More similar Beaumont's plot is a Dutch version from Driebergen titled Rozina. In this version, it is Rozina's vow to marry the Beast that eventually breaks the spell.

==== Central Europe ====
Beauty and the Beast (Albanian: E Bukura dhe Bisha, Bulgarian: Краса́вицата и Звя́ра, Krasávitsata i Zvyára, Macedonian: Убавицата и Ѕверот, Ubavitsata i Dzverot, Serbo-Croatian: Лепо̀тица и Звȇр, Lepòtica [Lepòtitsa] i Zvȇr, Slovenian: Lepotíca [Lepotítsa] in Zvȇr, Czech: Kráska a zvíře, Slovak: Kráska a zviera, Hungarian: A Szépség és a Szörnyeteg, Polish: Piękna i Bestia, Romanian: Frumoasa și Bestia, German: Die Schöne und das Biest) is known in several different variants in Central Europe.

The Brothers Grimm originally collected a variant of the story, titled The Summer and Winter Garden (Von dem Sommer- und Wintergarten). Here, the youngest daughter asks for a rose in the winter, so the father only finds one in a garden that is half-eternal winter and half-eternal summer. After making a deal with the beast, the father does not tell his daughters anything. Eight days later, the beast appears in the merchant's house and takes his youngest daughter away. When the heroine returns home, her father is ill. She cannot save him, and he dies. The heroine stays longer for her father's funeral, and when she finally returns, she finds the beast lying beneath a heap of cabbages. After the daughter revives the beast by pouring water over him, he turns into a handsome prince. The tale appeared in Brothers Grimm's collection's first edition, in 1812, but because the tale was too similar to its French counterpart, they omitted it in the next editions.

Despite the other folklorists collecting variants from German-speaking territories, Ludwig Bechstein published two versions of the story. In the first, Little Broomstick (Besenstielchen), the heroine, Nettchen, has a best friend called Little Broomstick because her father is a broommaker. Like in The Summer and Winter Garden, Nettchen asks for roses in the dead of winter, which her father only finds in the Beast's garden. When a carriage comes to bring Nettchen to the Beast's castle, Nettchen's father sends Little Broomstick, who pretends to be Nettchen. The Beast discovers the scheme, sends Little Broomstick back home, and Nettchen is sent to the Beast's castle. The prince is disenchanted before Nettchen's visit to her family to cure her father using the sap of a plant from the prince's garden. Jealous of her fortune, Nettchen's sisters drown her in the bath, but Nettchen is revived by the same sorceress who cursed the prince. Nettchen's eldest sisters are too dangerous, but Nettchen doesn't want them dead, so the sorceress turns them into stone statues.

In Bechstein's second version, The Little Nut Twig (Das Nußzweiglein), the heroine asks for the titular twig. When the father finally finds it, he has to make a deal with a bear, promising him the first creature that he meets when he arrives at home. This turns out to be his youngest daughter. Like in Little Broomstick, the merchant tries to deceive the bear by sending another girl, but the bear discovers his scheme and the merchant's daughter is sent to the bear. After she and the bear cross twelve rooms of disgusting creatures, the bear turns into a prince.

Carl and Theodor Colshorn collected two versions from Hannover. In the first one, The Clinking Clanking Lowesleaf (Vom klinkesklanken Löwesblatt), the heroine is the daughter of a king. She asks for the titular leaf, which the king only gets after making a deal with a black poodle, promising to give him the first person that greets the king when he arrives home. This turns out to be his youngest daughter. The merchant tries to trick the poodle, giving him other girls pretending to be the princess, but the poodle sees through this. Finally, the princess is sent to the poodle, who brings her to a cabin in the middle of the woods, where the princess feels so alone. She wishes for company, even if it is an old beggar woman. In an instant, an old beggar woman appears, and she tells the princess how to break the spell in exchange for inviting her to the princess' wedding. The princess keeps her promise, and her mother and sisters, who expressed disgust at the sight of the old beggar woman, become crooked and lame.

In Carl and Theodor Colshorn's second version, The Cursed Frog (Der verwunschene Frosch), the heroine is a merchant's daughter. The enchanted prince is a frog, and the daughter asks for a three-colored rose.

Ernst Meier collected a version from Swabia, in southwestern Germany, in which the heroine has only one sister instead of two.

Ignaz and Josef Zingerle collected an Austrian variant from Tannheim titled The Bear (Der Bär) in which the heroine is the eldest of the merchant's three daughters. Like in The Summer and Winter Garden and Little Broomstick, the protagonist asks for a rose in the middle of winter. Like in Zingerle's version, the Beast is a bear.

In the Swiss variant, The Bear Prince (Der Bärenprinz), collected by Otto Sutermeister, the youngest daughter asks for grapes.

In another Polish version from Kraków, the heroine is called Basia and has a stepmother and two stepsisters. An apple also plays a relevant role when the heroine goes to visit her family in a Polish version from Mazovia, in this case to warn the heroine that she is staying longer than she promised.

In a Czech variant, the heroine's mother plucks the flower and makes the deal with the Beast, who is a basilisk, who the heroine later will behead to break the spell.

In a Moravian version, the youngest daughter asks for three white roses, and the Beast is a dog; In another Moravian version, the heroine asks for a single red rose and the Beast is a bear.

In a Slovenian version from Livek titled The Enchanted Bear and the Castle (Začaran grad in medved), the heroine breaks the spell reading about the fate of the enchanted castle in an old dusty book.

In a Hungarian version titled The Speaking Grapes, the Smiling Apple and the Tinkling Apricot (Szóló szőlő, mosolygó alma, csengő barack), the princess asks her father for the titular fruits, and the Beast is a pig. The king agrees to give him his youngest daughter's hand in marriage if the pig is capable of moving the king's carriage, which is stuck in the mud. (Note: However, despite the proximity of the Hungarian tale with others of The Animal as Bridegroom cycle, Hungarian scholarship separates this tale under its own classification in the Hungarian Folktale Catalogue: MNK 425X*, "Gorgeous Grapes, Smiling Apple, Bloomy Peach". In the updated Catalogue of Hungarian Folktales (MNK), published in 1988, scholar Ákos Dömötor described type MNK 425X* as "a regional form" of ATU 425C, and of "Hungarian origin".)

==== Scandinavia ====
Beauty and the Beast (Danish: Skønheden og udyret, Norwegian: Skjønnheten og udyret (Bokmål) or Skjønnheita og udyret (Nynorsk), Swedish: Skönheten och odjuret, Icelandic: Fríða og Dýrið, or Yndisfríð og Ófreskjan, Faroese: Vakurleikin og Ódjórið, Finnish: Kaunotar ja Hirviö) is well-known in the Nordic countries, especially since the adaptation by Walt Disney Feature Animation in 1991.

Evald Tang Kristensen collected a Danish version that follows Beaumont's version almost exactly. The most significant difference is that the enchanted prince is a horse.

In a version from the Faroe Islands, the youngest daughter asks for an apple instead of a rose.

Kvitebjørn kong Valemon and Østenfor sol og vestenfor måne are some Norwegian variants of the fairy-tale.

==== Eastern Europe ====
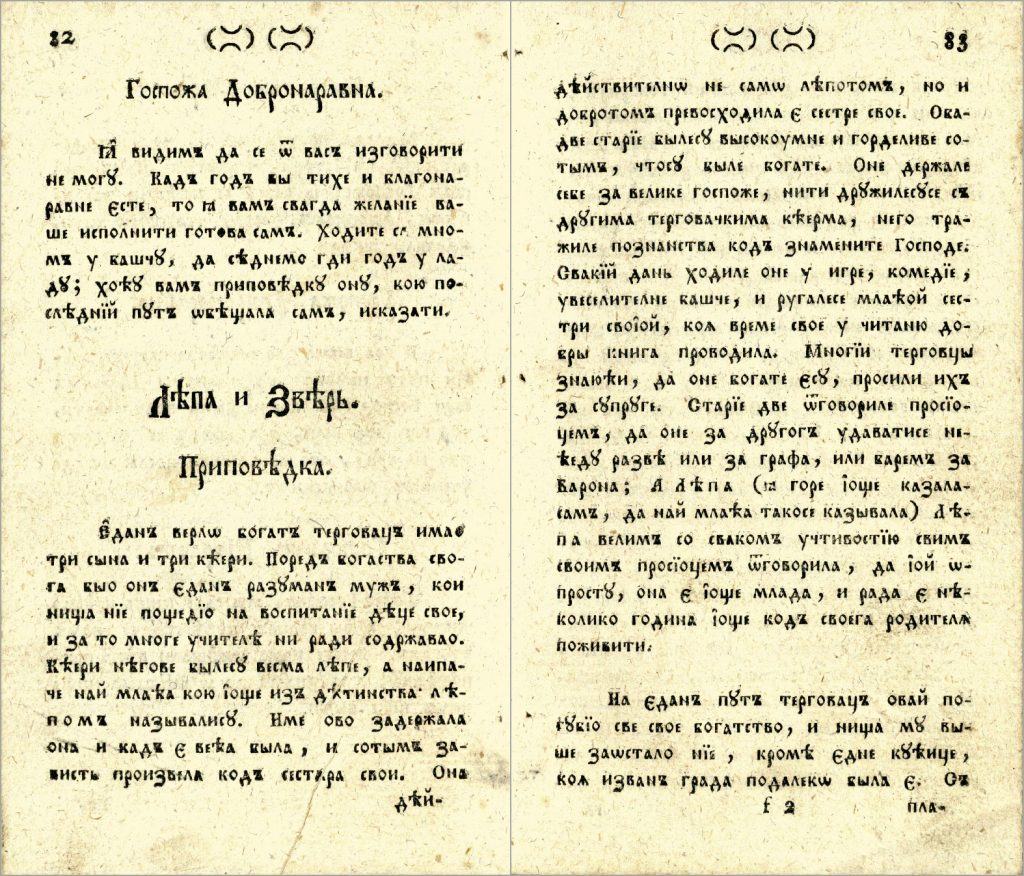
A Serbian translation from 1787, published in the old Slavonic-Serbian literary language, translated by Avram Mrazović.

Beauty and the Beast (Russian: Краса́вица и Чудо́вище, Krasávitsa i Tchudóvishtche, Ukrainian: Красу́ня і Чудо́висько, Krasúnya i Tchudóvysʹko, Belarusian: Прыгажу́ня і Пачва́ра, Pryhazhúnya i Patchvára) is known in some different versions in Eastern Europe.

Alexander Afanasyev collected a Russian version, The Enchanted Tsarevich (Закля́тый царе́вич, Zaklyátyĭ tsarévitch), in which the youngest daughter draws the flower she wants her father to bring her. The beast is a three-headed winged snake. There is a more famous version, The Scarlet Flower, written by Sergey Aksakov and published in 1858.

In a Ukrainian version, both the heroine's parents are dead. The Beast, who has the form of a snake, gives her the ability to revive people.

==== Greece and Cyprus ====
Beauty and the Beast in Modern Greek is called "Η Πεντάμορφη και το Τέρας" (I Pentámorfi kai to Téras) or "Η Ωραία και το Τέρας" (I Oraía kai to Téras), and Belle's name in Modern Greek is Μπελ (Bel, lit. translit. Mpel, pronounced as Bell).

In a version from the island of Zákynthos in Western Greece, the prince is turned into a snake by a nereid whom he rejected.

The prince is also turned into a snake in a version from Cyprus in which he is cursed by an orphan who was his lover. In the end, the heroine's elder sisters are turned into stone pillars.

=== Asia ===
Beauty and the Beast (Hebrew: הַיָפָה וְהַחַיָּה, Ha-Yafáh ve-Ha-Chayyáh, Arabic: الجميلة والوحش, Al-Jamīla wa-Al-Waḥsh, Persian: دیو و دلبر, Delbar o Div, Kurdish: Bedew û Cinawir or Ciwanê û Cinawir, Turkish: Güzel ve Çirkin, Chinese: 美女 與 野獸 (traditional) or 美女 与 野兽 (simplified), Měinǚ yǔ Yěshòu, Japanese: 美女 ト 野獣 (Kanji), Bíjò to̞ Yàjū, or びじょ と やじゅう (Hiragana), Bídyò to̞ Yàdyū, Korean: 미녀 와 야수, Minyeo wa Yasu, Indonesian: Si Cantik dan Si Buruk Rupa, Tagalog: Si Maganda at ang Halimaw) is known in some different variants in Asia.

==== Eastern Asia ====
North American missionary Adele M. Fielde collected a tale from Swatow, China, titled The Fairy Serpent. In this tale, the heroine's family is visited by wasps until she follows the beast, who is a serpent. One day, the well she usually fetches water from is dry, so she walks to a spring. When the heroine returns, she finds the snake dying and revives him plunging him in the water. This turns him into a human.

In a second Chinese variant, Pearl of the Sea, the youngest daughter of rich merchant Pekoe asks for a chip of The Great Wall of China because of a dream that she had. Her father steals a chip and is threatened by an army of Tatars who work for their master. In reality, the Tatar master is her uncle Chang, who has been enchanted prior to the story, and could only be released from his curse until a woman consented to live with him in the Great Wall.

=== North America ===
==== United States ====
William Wells Newell published an Irish American variant simply titled Rose in the Journal of American Folklore. In this version, the Beast takes the form of a lion.

Marie Campbell collected a version from the Appalachian Mountains, titled A Bunch of Laurela Blooms for a Present, in which the prince was turned into a frog.

Joseph Médard Carrière collected a version in which the Beast is described having a lion's head, a horse's back legs, a bull's body, and a snake's tail. Like the end of Beaumont's version, Beauty's sisters are turned into stone statues.

In a variant from Schoharie, New York, collected by Emelyn Elizabeth Gardner with the title The Rosy Story, the heroine is named Ellen. The character that demands the youngest daughter is a headless man, but the Beast-like figure is a large toad.

Folklorist Fanny Dickerson Bergen published a fragmentary variant from Ohio, with the title The Golden Bird, which is the object the youngest daughter asks for.

==== Mexico ====
Mexican linguist Pablo González Casanova collected a version from the Nahuatl titled Cizuanton huan yolcatl (Spanish: La doncella y la fiera), in which after returning to her family's home, the heroine finds the beast dead on the ground. The girl falls asleep by his side, and she dreams of the beast, who tells her to cut a specific flower and spray its water on his face. The heroine does so, and the beast turns into a beautiful young man.

=== South America ===
Lindolfo Gomes collected a Brazilian version titled A Bela e a Fera in which the deal consists of the father promising to give the Beast the first living creature that greets him at home. The heroine later visits her family because her eldest sister is getting married.

== Broader themes ==
Harries identifies the two most popular strands of fairy-tale in the 18th century as the fantastical romance for adults and the didactic tale for children. Beauty and the Beast is interesting as it bridges this gap, with Villeneuve's version being written as a salon tale for adults and Beaumont's being written as a didactic tale for children.

== Commentary ==
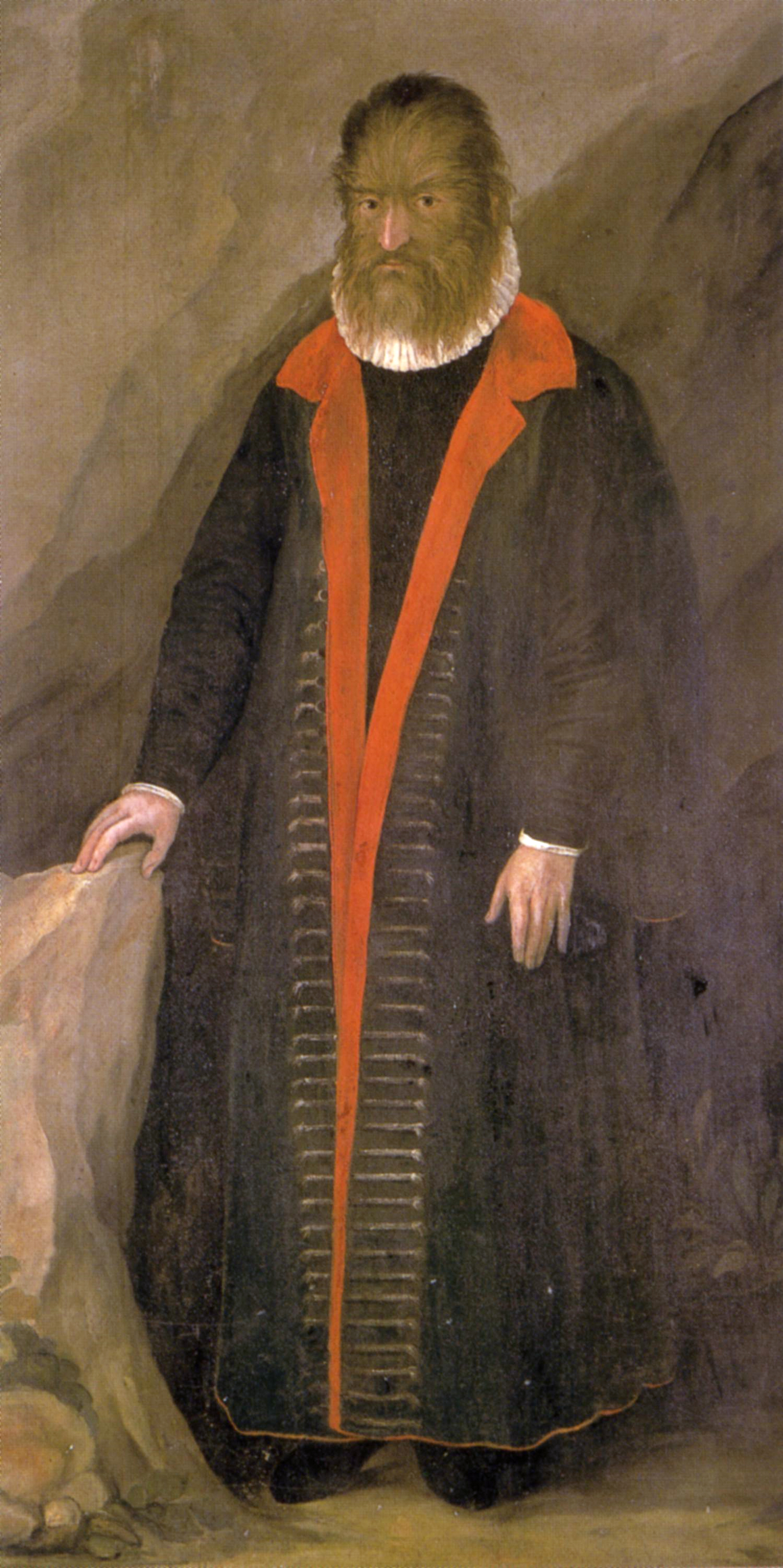
Painting of Petrus Gonsalvus (c. 1580).

Tatar (2017) compares the tale to the theme of "animal brides and grooms" found in folklore throughout the world, pointing out that the French tale was specifically intended for the preparation of young girls in 18th century France for arranged marriages. The urban opening is unusual in fairy-tales, as is the social class of the characters, neither royal nor peasants; it may reflect the social changes occurring at the time of its first writing.

Hamburger (2015) points out that the design of the Beast in the 1946 film adaptation by Jean Cocteau was inspired by the portrait of Petrus Gonsalvus, a native of Tenerife who suffered from hypertrichosis, causing an abnormal growth of hair on his face and other parts, and who came under the protection of the French king and married a beautiful Parisian woman named Catherine.

== Modern uses and adaptations ==
The tale has been notably adapted for screen, stage, prose, and television over many years.

=== Literature ===
- The Scarlet Flower (1858), a Russian fairy-tale by Sergey Aksakov.
- Beauty and the Beast ... The Story Retold (1886), by Laura E. Richards.
- Beauty: A Retelling of the Story of Beauty and the Beast (1978), by Robin McKinley.
- "The Courtship of Mr. Lyon" (1979), from Angela Carter's The Bloody Chamber, based on Madame Le Prince de Beaumont's version. "The Tiger's Bride" in the same book is a variant of the tale.
- Beauty (1983), a short story by Tanith Lee, a science fiction retelling of Beauty and the Beast.
- Fashion Beast, a 1985 screenplay by Alan Moore, adapted into a graphic novel in 2012.
- "A Grain of Truth" (1993), a short story by Andrzej Sapkowski in The Last Wish.
- Lord of Scoundrels (1995), by Loretta Chase, a Regency romance and retelling of Beauty and the Beast.
- The Fire Rose (1995), by Mercedes Lackey.
- Rose Daughter (1997), by Robin McKinley.
- Beauty (1997), modern retelling by Susan Wilson.
- The Quantum Rose, by Catherine Asaro, a science fiction retelling of Beauty and the Beast.
- Beastly (2007), by Alex Flinn, a version that sets the story in modern-day Manhattan.
- Bryony and Roses (2015), by T. Kingfisher (pen name of Ursula Vernon).
- Belle: An Amish Retelling of Beauty and the Beast (2017), by Sarah Price.
- A Court of Thorns and Roses (2015), by Sarah J. Maas.
- A Curse So Dark and Lonely (2019), by Brigid Kemmerer.
- Vow of Eternal Night (2026), by Lily Crozier.

=== Live-action feature films ===
- La Belle et la Bête (1946), directed by Jean Cocteau, starring Jean Marais as the Beast and Josette Day as Beauty.
- Beauty and the Beast (1962), directed by Edward L. Cahn, starring Joyce Taylor and Mark Damon.
- Panna a netvor (1978), a Czechoslovak film directed by Juraj Herz.
- Beauty and the Beast (1987), a musical live-action version directed by Eugene Marner, starring John Savage as Beast, and Rebecca De Mornay as Beauty.
- Blood of Beasts (2005), a Viking period film directed by David Lister alternatively known as Beauty and the Beast.
- Spike (2008), directed by Robert Beaucage, a dark version of the fairy-tale updated to modern times.
- Beauty and the Beast (2009), an Australian fantasy reimagining of the tale, starring Estella Warren.
- Beastly (2011), directed by Daniel Barnz and starring Alex Pettyfer as the beast (named Kyle) and Vanessa Hudgens as the love interest.
- Beauty and the Beast (2014), a French-German film.
- Beauty and the Beast (2017), a live-action adaptation of the 1991 Disney animated film, directed by Bill Condon, and starring Emma Watson and Dan Stevens.

=== Animated feature films ===
- The Scarlet Flower (1952), an animated feature film directed by Lev Atamanov and produced at the Soyuzmultfilm.
- Beauty and the Beast, a planned animated film that was to be directed by Don Bluth and distributed by Columbia Pictures. It was announced in 1984 and subsequently cancelled in 1989.
- Beauty and the Beast (1991), an animated film produced by Walt Disney Feature Animation and directed by Kirk Wise and Gary Trousdale, with a screenplay by Linda Woolverton, and songs by Alan Menken and Howard Ashman.
- Beauty and the Beast (1992), a direct-to-video animated feature film unrelated to the preceding year's Disney release but containing similar packaging, featuring Irene Cara as the voice of Beauty, Jan Rabson as Beauty's father, and Susan Silo as Beauty's sister Alicia, Clara the Fairy Housekeeper, and the evil fairy that was Clara's sister.
- Belle (2021), a Japanese animated science fantasy film written and directed by Mamoru Hosoda and produced by Studio Chizu.

=== Live-action television ===
- Shirley Temple's Storybook episode "Beauty and the Beast" (1958), broadcast live and in color starring Claire Bloom and Charlton Heston.
- Beauty and the Beast (1976), a made-for-television movie starring George C. Scott and Trish Van Devere.
- "Beauty and the Beast" (1984), an episode of Shelley Duvall's Faerie Tale Theatre, starring Klaus Kinski and Susan Sarandon.
- Mansion of the Beast (1985), episode in the short-living Otherworld_(TV_series), with nods to Beauty_and_the_Beast_(1946_film) from Jean_Cocteau.
- Beauty and the Beast (1987), a television series which centers around the relationship between Catherine (played by Linda Hamilton), an attorney who lives in New York City, and Vincent (played by Ron Perlman), a gentle but lion-faced "beast" who dwells in the tunnels beneath the city.
- Beauty (1998), a made-for-television movie starring Janine Turner and Jamey Sheridan.
- Beauty & the Beast (2012), a reworking and modernizing of the 1987 TV series starring Jay Ryan and Kristin Kreuk.
- Once Upon a Time episode "Skin Deep" (2012), starring Emilie de Ravin as Belle and Eric Keenleyside as Maurice. In this show, Rumplestiltskin (portrayed by Robert Carlyle) was amalgamated with the Beast and the Crocodile from Peter Pan.
- Beauty and the Beast (2014), an Italian/Spanish two-part miniseries starring Blanca Suárez and Alessandro Preziosi.
- Bekaboo (2023), an Indian television series.
- The Princess and the Werewolf (2023) is a Chinese television series, starring Chen Zheyuan and Wu Xuanyi in a comedic spin on the tale, where the wolf king wants to marry a sassy princess who accidentally swallowed the pearl that holds his power. 30 episodes airing 20 July – 18 August 2023.

=== Animated television ===
- Tales of Magic (1976–79), anime anthology series animated by Dax International features a 10-minute adaptation.
- Hello Kitty's Furry Tale Theater (1987), episode Kitty and the Beast, created by Sanrio, produced by DIC Enterpr ises and animated by Toei Animation.
- Grimm's Fairy-Tale Classics episode "Beauty and the Beast (The Story of the Summer Garden and the Winter Garden)" (1988). The Beast is depicted with an ogre-like appearance.
- Long Ago and Far Away (1990), an episode narrated by Mia Farrow
- Britannica's Tales Around the World (1990–91), features three variations of the story.
- World Fairy-Tale Series (Anime sekai no dōwa) (1995), anime television anthology produced by Toei Animation, has half-hour adaptation.
- Happily Ever After: Fairy-Tales for Every Child had an episode featuring an African adaption of "Beauty and the Beast" which starred the voices of Vanessa L. Williams as Beauty, Gregory Hines as the Beast, and Paul Winfield as Beauty's Father. The Beast is depicted as having a rhinoceros head, a lion-like mane and tail, a humanoid body, and a camel-like hump where he is served by gargoyle-like servants
- Wolves, Witches and Giants (1995–99), episode Beauty and the Beast, season 2 episode 12.
- Stories from My Childhood, episode "Beauty and the Beast (A Tale of the Crimson Flower)" (1998), featuring the voices of Amy Irving as Beauty, Tim Curry as the Beast, and Robert Loggia as Beauty's father.
- The Triplets (Les tres bessones/Las tres mellizas) (1997-2003), Catalan animated series, has a spoof of the fairy-tale in episode 22 from the third season.
- Simsala Grimm (1999-2010), episode 12 of season 3.
- Sofia the First episode "Beauty is the Beast" (2016), in which Princess Charlotte of Isleworth (voiced by Megan Hilty) is turned into a beast (a cross between a human and a wild boar with a wolf-like tail) by a powerful enchantress for how she treated a local goblin (voiced by Andrew Rannells).

=== Theatre ===
- La Belle et la Bête (1994), an opera by Philip Glass based on Cocteau's film. Glass's composition follows the film scene by scene, effectively providing a new original soundtrack for the movie.
- Beauty and the Beast (1994), a musical adaptation of the Disney film by Linda Woolverton and Alan Menken, with additional lyrics by Tim Rice.
- Beauty and the Beast (2011), a ballet choreographed by David Nixon for Northern Ballet, including compositions by Bizet and Poulenc.

=== Other ===
- A hidden object game, Mystery Legends: Beauty and the Beast, was released in 2012.
- The hidden object game series Dark Parables based the main story of ninth game (The Queen of Sands) on the tale.
- The narrative of the Sierra Entertainment adventure game King's Quest VI follows several fairy-tales, and Beauty and the Beast is the focus of one multiple part quest.
- G5 Entertainment published a free-to-play hidden object game called Sherlock (2020), where one of the featured books is Beauty and the Beast.
- Stevie Nicks recorded "Beauty and the Beast" for her 1983 solo album, The Wild Heart.
- Real Life based the video for their signature hit "Send Me an Angel" on the fairy story.
- Disco producer Alec R. Costandinos released a twelve inch by his side project Love & Kisses with the theme of the fairy-tale set to a disco melody in 1978.
- The interactive fiction work Bronze by Emily Short is a puzzle-oriented adaptation of Beauty and the Beast.

== See also ==
- East of the Sun and West of the Moon
- Eros and Psyche
- The King of the Snakes (Chinese folktale)
- Noble savage
- Shapeshifting
- Thabaton and Keibu Keioiba - Meitei mythology equivalent of the Beauty and the Beast.
