= Brigid Kemmerer =

American author

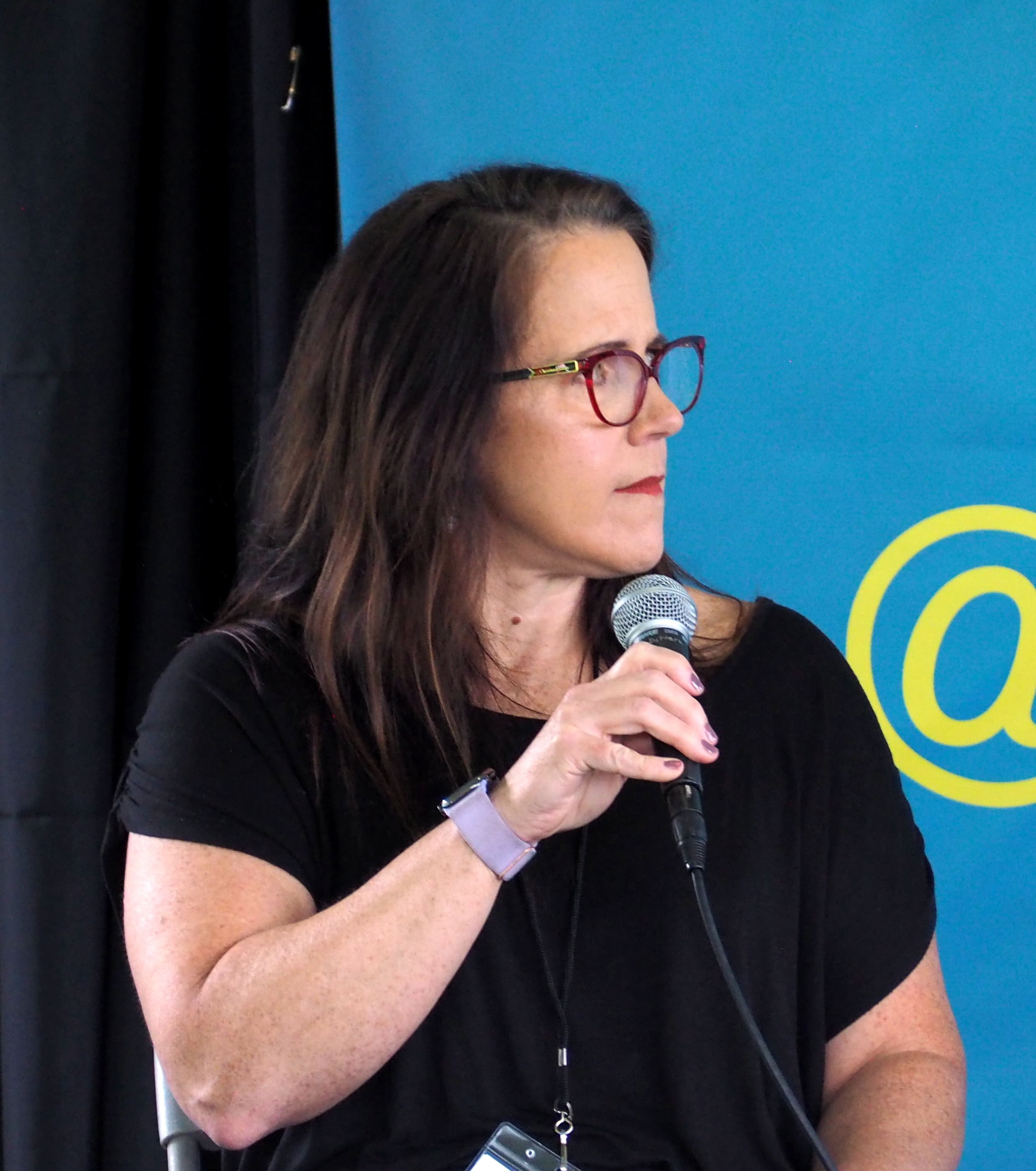
- Kemmerer at the 2024 Gaithersburg Book Festival
- Born: January 11, 1978 (age 48); Omaha, Nebraska, U.S.
- Occupations: Author; speaker
- Writing career
- Language: English
- Genres: Fantasy; romance; young adult fiction
- Website: brigidkemmerer.com

Brigid Kemmerer (born January 11, 1978) is an American author of young-adult fantasy and romance novels. She is best known for her series Cursebreakers, Defy the Night, and Letters to the Lost.

== Life ==
Kemmerer was born in Omaha, Nebraska, but lived in many other places during her early life including Albuquerque, New Mexico, and Cleveland, Ohio, before settling in Annapolis, Maryland. She was raised Catholic.

Her favorite books as a child were Shattered Glass by Elaine Bergstrom, The Vampire Chronicles by Anne Rice, Dun Lady’s Jess by Doranna Durgin, and Anything by Christopher Pike.

She worked in the finance industry before becoming a full-time writer.

She lives in the Baltimore area with her husband and sons. Kemmerer does not identify as religious, instead considering herself a spiritual person.

== Career ==
The authors most influential to her writing are Christopher Pike, Jodi Picoult, Charlaine Harris, Dan Savage, and Bill Konigsberg.

=== Cursebreakers series ===
One of the main characters in the Cursebreakers series, Harper, has cerebral palsy, which Kemmerer was inspired to include because one of her friends has the same condition. The first book is based on the fairytale "Beauty and the Beast".

A Curse So Dark and Lonely was a New York Times bestseller and received a starred review from Publishers Weekly.

=== Defy the Night series ===
Defy the Night is about a kingdom ruled by a cruel king whose brother is in charge of enforcing the law and meets an apothecary apprentice who illegally sneaks around to try to cure a mysterious illness making its way through the land.

=== Letters to the Lost series ===
Her novel More Than We Can Tell, a companion to her earlier book Letters to the Lost, received a starred review from the School Library Journal.

== Publications ==
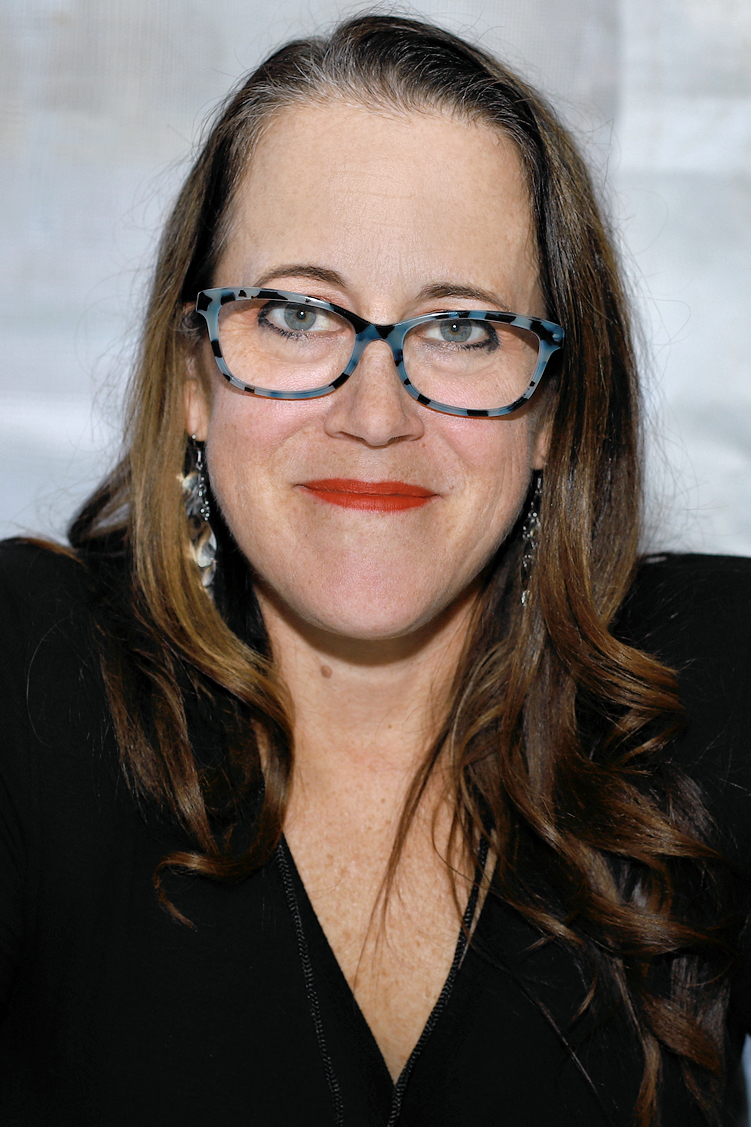
Kemmerer at the 2022 Texas Book Festival.

=== Elemental series ===
- Elemental (#0.5) (2012)
- Storm (#1) (2012)
- Fearless (#1.5) (2012)
- Spark (#2) (2012)
- Breathless (#2.5) (2013)
- Spirit (#3) (2013)
- Secret (#4) (2014)
- Sacrifice (#5) (2014)

=== Letters to the Lost series ===
- Letters to the Lost (2017)
- More Than We Can Tell (2018)

=== Cursebreakers series ===
- A Curse So Dark and Lonely (2019)
- A Heart So Fierce and Broken (2020)
- A Vow So Bold and Deadly (2021)

=== Forging Silver into Stars series (Cursebreakers spin-off) ===
- Forging Silver into Stars (2022)
- Carving Shadows into Gold (2025)
- Sparking Fire out of Fate (2026)

=== Defy the Night series ===
- Defy the Night (2021)
- Defend the Dawn (2022)
- Destroy the Day (2024)

=== Braided Fate series ===
- Warrior Princess Assassin (2025)
- Captive Traitor King (2026)

=== Standalone novels ===
- Thicker Than Water (2015)
- Call It What You Want (2019)
