= Prince Hyacinth and the Dear Little Princess =

Prince Hyacinth and the Dear Little Princess, a French fairy tale, is the second story in Andrew Lang's The Blue Fairy Book.

== Translations ==
Andrew Lang gave as reference, at the end of the story, the tale of Le Prince Desir et la Princesse Mignonne, by Madame Leprince de Beaumont.

An English language translation, by Laura Valentine, named it Prince Desire and Princess Mignonnetta, in The Old, Old Fairy Tales.

Author and dramatist James Planché translated the tale as The Prince Désir and the Princess Mignone.

== Synopsis ==
Prince Hyacinth is born to a widowed Queen. He is a beautiful baby, except for his nose- the very largest ever seen. Unknown to either the Queen or any of her court, this giant nose had been foretold before his parents' marriage.

Prince Hyacinth's father, the King, had sought the help of the Fairy to win the Princess when his courtship failed. Taking pity on the distraught suitor, she told him the secret of breaking the spell that prevented the Princess from marrying: step on the tail of the Princess' great cat. As soon as the King managed to get his foot squarely on the cat's tail, the animal transformed into an angry wizard, who tried to dampen the King's joy. "You will have a son who will be horribly unhappy", the enchanter taunted, "a Prince made miserable because he will not know of the enormity of his own nose". The King was more confounded than worried by this prediction. After all, how could anyone not know the appearance of his own nose?

Sure enough, the prince grew to be a man with no idea that he had an unusual facial feature. From the moment of his birth, his mother and everyone at court went to great lengths to imply that the length of his nose was not only normal but desirable. Only children with extra-long noses were allowed to play with him, courtiers pulled on their own noses to make them appear longer, his history tutor took pains to describe any handsome or beautiful personage as having had a particularly long nose.

When he became of age, Prince Hyacinth was shown a portrait of a dear little Princess. Falling in love with her instantly, he still had to admit that her nose was extremely small and tilted. His mother, pleased with the match, re-assured him that small noses are actually not considered so ugly in women. Ambassadors were sent to ask the neighboring King for the Dear Little Princess' hand in marriage.

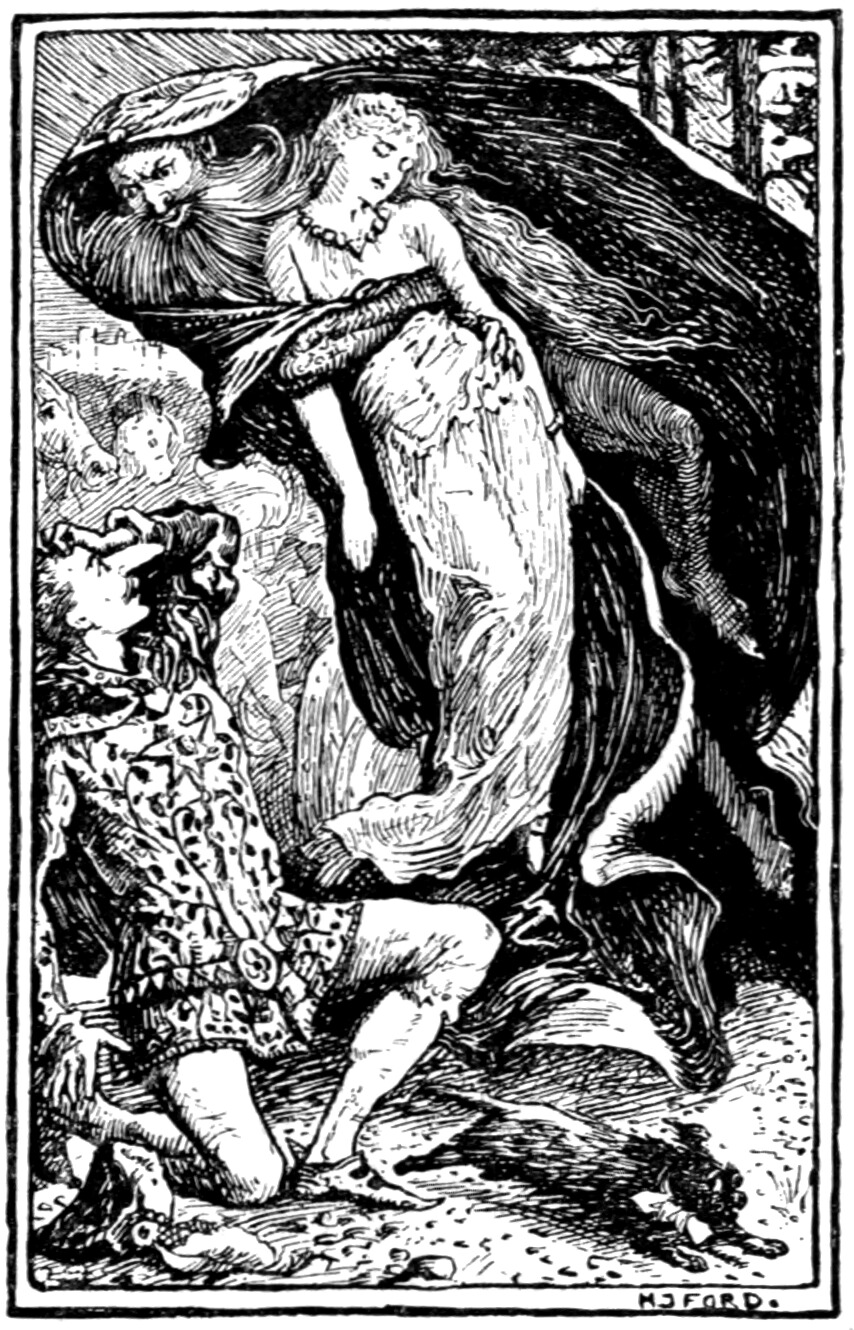
The sorcerer seizes the princess, as Prince Hyacinth watches. Illustration by Henry Justice Ford for Andrew Lang's The Blue Fairy Book (1889).

Consent was given, and the joyful Prince travelled to meet her. As he approached, ready to kiss her hand, the Sorcerer appeared and whisked her away.

The Prince ordered his entourage of courtiers to leave him and wandered, disconsolate. For the first time in his life, he was alone. He meets the Fairy, a little old woman who takes quite some time adjusting her spectacles to look him over. Her nose is too short to easily secure the glasses, and they repeatedly fall off. Regarding each other, each bursts into laughter. The Prince is stunned to find the Fairy thinks his nose is ridiculous. He sees that everyone flatters her and assumes they have deceived her into believing her tiny nose is not a fault. How foolish some people are, he thinks, not to see the reality of their own character. At dinner, which he is very glad to get, his hunger prompts him to put up with her repeated observations about the length of his nose. Finally, he asks her to stop mentioning his nose. She agrees, promising that she will not only stop talking about it, she will even try to believe he has an ordinary nose, though clearly it could make three reasonable sized ones. With that, the Prince has had enough and rides off. Everywhere he goes, searching for the Dear Little Princess, he meets people who claim that his nose is abnormally large. He thinks them all mad.

The old Fairy, who had been so fond of his father, helps Prince Hyacinth. She shuts the Dear Little Princess in a crystal palace and places the palace where the Prince will find it. With great joy, he sets to work to free her, but cannot get through its walls. The Dear Little Princess extends her hand through a window for him to kiss it, but he cannot manage to get his lips past his nose to touch her hand, no matter how he turns or twists. For the first time, he realizes just how long that nose really is, too long!

With that realization, the crystal palace shattered into splinters and the old Fairy presented the Dear Little Princess to him with the admonition, "You see how self-love keeps us from knowing our own defects. We refuse to see them until we find them in the way of our interests."

Prince Hyacinth's nose shrinks down to a usual size and he marries the Dear Little Princess. The two live happily ever after.
