= Thomas Pichon =

French colonial official (1700–1781)

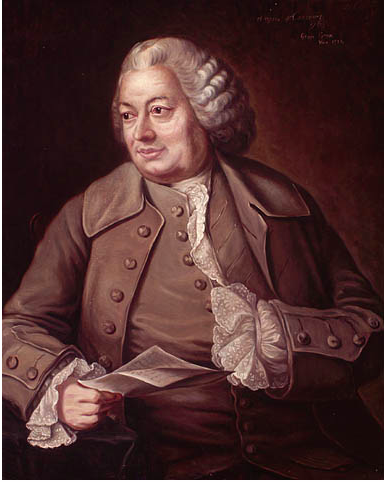
- Thomas Pichon by Henri Baud (1800–1900) (copied from original portrait by N. Coucourt)
- Born: 30 March 1700; Vire (dept of Calvados), France
- Died: 22 November 1781 (aged 81); Saint Helier, Jersey
- Known for: colonial official, spy, and author

Thomas Pichon (30 March 1700 – 22 November 1781), also known as Thomas Tyrell, was a French government agent during Father Le Loutre's War. Pichon is renowned for betraying the French, Acadian and Mi’kmaq forces by providing information to the British, which led to the fall of Beauséjour. He has been referred to as "The Judas of Acadia."

== Father Le Loutre's War ==
During Father Le Loutre's War, Pichon entered the service of secretary for Jean-Louis de Raymond, latterly reputed to be a place-seeker, who had been appointed Governor at the Fortress of Louisbourg and Île-Royale (New France) in 1751.

== Death and legacy ==
Pichon retreated to London in 1757, where he entered on an affair with the French novelist Jeanne-Marie Leprince de Beaumont, whose marriage had been annulled. Never a master of the English language, in 1769 he moved to Saint Helier, Jersey (a remnant of the Norman conquest where French was spoken), in which place he died on 22 November 1781.

Pichon left behind a very large collection of documents. They are held by the Bibliothèque municipale de Vire, in Normandy, France. His 1760 book on Cape Breton Island—Genuine letters and memoirs relating to the natural, civil, and commercial history of the islands of Cape Breton and Saint John : from the first settlement there, to the taking of Louisbourg by the English in 1758—published in both English and French shortly after the conquest of Louisbourg in 1758, was the first such history of that island.

Pichon has been called Le Judas de l'Acadie by a 20th-century French-Canadian priest-historian, and elsewhere his conduct has been uniformly deplored. Between 2012 and 2015, historian and novelist A. J. B. Johnston made Pichon the central character is a series of three novels.

== See also ==
- Military history of Nova Scotia
- Military history of the Acadians

== In fiction ==
Thomas Pichon's life is the inspiration for a series of novels by Canadian historian and novelist A. J. B. Johnston.

- Johnston, A.J.B. (2015). Crossings, A Thomas Pichon Novel. Sydney: Cape Breton University Press. ISBN 978-1-77206-020-1. EPUB 978-1-77206-022-5, Kindle 978-1-77206-023-2, Web pdf 978-1-77206-021-8
- Johnston, A.J.B. (2014). The Maze, A Thomas Pichon Novel. Sydney: Cape Breton University Press. ISBN 978-1-897009-76-5. EPUB 978-1-927492-71-0, MOBI 978-1-927492-72-7
- Johnston, A.J.B. (2012). Thomas, A Secret Life. Sydney: Cape Breton University Press. ISBN 978-1-897009-74-1. EPUB 978-1-897009-89-5, MOBI 978-1-897009-90-1
