= A Curse So Dark and Lonely =

Novel by Brigid Kemmerer

- Author: Brigid Kemmerer
- Language: English
- Series: Cursebreakers Series
- Genre: Young adult
- Published: Bloomsbury
- Publication date: January 29, 2019
- Publication place: United States
- Media type: Print (hardback)
- Pages: 496
- ISBN: 978-1-68119-508-7

A Curse So Dark and Lonely is a young adult fantasy novel written by American author Brigid Kemmerer. This is the first book in the Cursebreakers series and an adaptation of Beauty and the Beast. Sequels include A Heart So Fierce and Broken and A Vow So Bold and Deadly. It was a New York Times bestseller and garnered a starred review from Publishers Weekly when it came out in 2019. The book later rose to popularity on the social media app TikTok.

== Plot ==
Harper, a teenage girl with Cerebral Palsy living in Washington D.C., is accidentally transported to the kingdom of Emberfall while trying to stop a kidnapping. Once there, she meets Prince Rhen and Commander Grey of the Royal Guard at the abandoned Ironrose Castle. The castle is trapped in time, repeating the autumn season of Rhen's eighteenth year until he can find a girl to fall in love with. At the end of the season, Rhen turns into a bloodthirsty monster and rampages until the loop resets again. Though the season has repeated hundreds of times, outside of Ironrose only five years have passed. Lilith, the enchantress who cursed Rhen, has declared that this will be the last season and his final chance at breaking the curse. With the royal family dead, murdered by Rhen after he transformed during the first season, and Rhen sequestered in his castle to keep his people safe, Emberfall is essentially rulerless and vulnerable to foreign invaders.

Karis Luran, the Queen of Syhl Shallow has been encroaching on Emberfall's borders, sending soldiers to seize land and say they are doing so for the crown. With Emberfall's army dissolved due to the absence of a monarch's involvement in the kingdom's affairs, Rhen partners with Harper to claim that she is the princess of a distant kingdom called Disi. They bluff an alliance that will grant Emberfall Disi's fictitious troops to scare Karis Luran into backing down. As the season progresses, feelings bud between Rhen and Harper, but the kingdom's situation is too dire for things to develop further. Throughout the season, Lilith makes appearances to torture Rhen with her magic. Harper tries to stop her and is shown a vision of her family back in D.C. Jake, her older brother, is given one more day to pay off the loan shark their family is indebted to, and their mother is near death from cancer. Harper begs to be allowed to return home, and Lilith grants Grey the power to travel between worlds at will rather than only at the start and end of the season. Rhen agrees to let her go, knowing that if Harper leaves, she will take any chance of breaking the curse with her. Harper makes Grey promise to return to D.C. for her in one day so she can go back to Emberfall and try to fix things before it is too late.

Harper pays off the loan shark with jewels from Rhen and is there for her mother's death. Jake doesn't believe her story about Grey and Emberfall, especially when Grey fails to come back for her. She tries to adjust back to her old life. While having dinner with Jake and his boyfriend Noah, a resident doctor at a hospital, Grey shows up at the door gravely injured. Noah patches him back up, but the loan shark returns, demanding to know where Jake got the jewels from. Before a fight can break out, Grey transports them all to Emberfall.

Emberfall is under attack. Karis Luran has her soldiers marching on Ironrose Castle and people are unable to evacuate due to attacks from Rhen, who has turned into a winged monster. Harper comes up with a plan to get Rhen's people out, and in the process, finds out that even in his monster form he recognizes and listens to her. She leads a march against Syhl Shallow's overwhelming forces, using the monster to drive them back over the mountains. Lilith returns, ready to run a sword through monster Rhen, but Harper takes the strike for him. Grey steps in and transports Lilith to the real world where he will be able to kill her. Rhen's curse is broken, but it is unclear if this is due to Harper's act of love or if it happened because Lilith was killed. Grey doesn't return, and without him to take Harper, Jake, and Noah home, they are stuck in Emberfall helping to rebuild the kingdom. It is assumed that Grey is dead, but he fled after Lilith revealed to him that he is the true heir to Emberfall, and the product of an affair the king had with an enchantress before Rhen was born.

== Characters ==
Harper: A 17-year-old girl from Washington D.C. with Cerebral Palsy. Her father abandoned their family, her mother is dying from cancer, and her older brother, Jake, is trying to pay off their father's debts to a loan shark. She plays the role of Princess Harper of Disi, a made up kingdom, during her time in Emberfall.

Prince Rhen: The Crown Prince of Emberfall. He has been cursed by Lilith to repeat the season and turn into a bloodthirsty monster at the end of it if he cannot find a girl to fall in love with him. As the last remaining member of the royal family, it is his duty to reaffirm to the people of Emberfall that their monarchs are still looking out for them and secure his borders from foreign threats.

Commander Grey: The last remaining remember of the Royal Guard. He swore loyalty to Prince Rhen and is the only one by his side through the curse, repeating the season with him. Lilith gave him the power to cross between worlds, but only at the beginning of the season to find a new girl to try to break the curse.

Lilith: The last enchantress left in Emberfall after the king, Rhen's father, banished them from the kingdom. She is a jilted ex-lover of Rhen's and put the curse on him to teach him a lesson. Throughout the repeating seasons, she shows up to torture him and Grey with her magic.

Freya: Saved by Harper, Rhen, and Grey when her home was burned by invaders, leaving herself and her children homeless. She later becomes Harper's lady in waiting.

Zo: Apprentice to the Master of Song for Silvermoon. She ends up joining the Royal Guard. When assigned to protect Harper, the two become friends.

Jake: Harper's brother, who often has to harm people or commit other crimes at the behest of the lone shark his family in indebted to. With Harper gone, he is taking care of their sick mother alone while trying not to drag his boyfriend, Noah, into his family's trouble. He believes his sister to be dead until her surprise return, and plays the role of Crown Prince of Disi while in Emberfall.

Noah: Jake's boyfriend and a resident doctor at a hospital. When accidentally transported to Emberfall, he becomes their version of a healer and runs the infirmary caring for those injured by Syhl Shallow's attempted invasion.

Karis Luran: The Queen of Syhl Shallow, a neighboring kingdom. The long absence of the royal family has allowed her to encroach on Emberfall's borders, eventually building up to a full-scale invasion.

== Background ==
A Curse So Dark and Lonely was first drafted in 2012 when fantasy was not desired by the author's publisher at the time, and was shelved until Kemmerer began working on it again in 2016 for fun. In an interview with Publishers Weekly, she shares that she finds the story of Beauty and the Beast so compelling because "there's something that's really fascinating about falling in love with someone for who they are rather than the exterior impression they give the world," and she was particularly interested in exploring what was happening to the people of the kingdom during their prince's curse.

Kemmerer grew up with a friend who has Cerebral Palsy, and states that while writing Harper with the condition, she "wanted to look at the idea of curses, and how sometimes what seems like a curse to one person might not be a curse at all to someone else." She has explained that she does not do much planning beyond determining a few key plot points and that "part of the magic for me is the discovery I experience during writing." The book ended up being published by Bloomsbury after extensive rewriting.

== Reception ==
A Curse So Dark and Lonely was a New York Times Bestseller upon its release. This was Brigid Kemmerer's ninth novel, but her first time on the bestseller list, and it has been referred to as her "breakout novel." It made the Indie Next List as a Kid's Next Winter 2018-2019 pick. According to Publishers Weekly, Kemmerer's combined sales for all of her books published with Bloomsbury surged to over one million copies in the year after A Curse So Dark and Lonely's release.

A starred review from Publishers Weekly called it an "enthralling modern fable" that does a good job "illustrating intimacy's relationship with honesty, respect, trust, and consent." Kirkus Reviews dubbed this book "A fast-paced, richly detailed feminist epic." Tor highlighted A Curse So Dark and Lonely as one of their recommendations for Science Fiction/Fantasy books with disability representation, saying that Harper "embraces her true value, makes friends who don't view her as a liability, and sees her condition as a part of her that she doesn't need to change."

A Curse So Dark and Lonely has also found success in the BookTok corner of TikTok, exposing it to a wider audience and causing it to receive notice for being similar in audience to other popular books on the app like A Court of Thorns and Roses.
