= A. J. B. Johnston =

Canadian historian, novelist and museum writer

- Born: Andrew John Bayly Johnston; Truro, Nova Scotia, Canada
- Education: Dalhousie University, Université Laval
- Occupations: Historian; Writer
- Spouse: Mary Topshee
- Children: 3
- Writing career
- Genres: History, Historical fiction
- Subject: Atlantic Canada
- Website: ajbjohnston.com

Andrew John Bayly Johnston is a Canadian historian, novelist, and museum writer. He is the author of six novels of historical fiction, as well as 16 books (and over 100 articles) on the history of Atlantic Canada. Johnston is originally from Truro, Nova Scotia, and currently lives in Halifax.

== Career ==
Johnston's writing career is closely associated with the history of the Fortress of Louisbourg. In recognition of his body of work on that national historic site of Canada, the Government of France made Johnston a chevalier of the Ordre des Palmes académiques. His 2017 book Endgame 1758 won a Clio award from the Canadian Historical Association and was short-isted for the Dartmouth Book Award.

Johnston had a long career as an historian with Parks Canada.

The historical account Ni'n na L'nu: The Mi'kmaq of Prince Edward Island, co-authored with Jesse Francis, won the "best Atlantic-published" book, the PEI Book Award for non-fiction and a PEI Heritage Award. Johnston also developed the story lines and scripts for the exhibit of the same name.

Johnston has written the scripts for many exhibits in Atlantic Canada. Some of those exhibits have been at (or currently still are at) the Nova Scotia Museum, the Colchester Historeum, Musée des Acadiens des Pubnicos, Yarmouth County Museum, the Black Cultural Centre, and the aforementioned travelling exhibit entitled N'in na L'nu: The Mi'kmaq of Prince Edward Island.

Since 2009, Johnston has published three novels inspired by the historical figure of Thomas Pichon (1700–1781): Thomas, A Secret Life (2012), The Maze (2014) and Crossings (2015).Atlantic Books Today described Johnston as "a natural to write this story". The review of Thomas in The Antigonish Review stated: "This is a fine novel, one that strikes just the right balance between fact and fiction." As for The Maze, Paul W. Bennett writes: "Taking on historical fiction and imaginatively recreating the inner life of one of Canada's most controversial early historical figures would be beyond the reach of most scholars. A. J. B. Johnston... is more than equal to that challenge." The reviewer in the Nashwaak Review wrote: "Pichon is as real and developed a character as you will find anywhere ... both believable and impressive." Two more novels appeared in 2018, with The Hat, a YA novel about the Expulsion of the Acadians from Grand-Pré in 1755, and Something True, a coming-of-age biographical fiction about Katharine McLennan (1892–1975).

In 2020, Nimbus Publishing released Johnston's Kings of Friday Night: The Lincolns about a 1960s rock 'n roll band that was based in Truro, Nova Scotia, and was widely popular across the Maritimes. Though all-white, they played mostly Soul and R&B songs, and are credited with breaking racial barriers at the time. One member of that band was renowned playwright, novelist and composer John MacLachlan Gray. Gray wrote the "Foreword" to the book. The "Afterword" was written by the band's singer, Frank MacKay. After The Lincolns and a Toronto-based band called Soma, MacKay would go on to have a celebrated career as a stage actor as well. Johnston was interviewed about the book on "Book-Me Podcasts", hosted by Costas Halavrezos. In November 2020, Johnston collaborated with Tom Ryan and Costas Halavrezos to create a 5-minute micro-documentary about The Lincolns. The video—Kings of Friday Night: The Lincolns—was posted on YouTube

Johnston's research archives are deposited at the Beaton Institute of the Cape Breton University.

In February and March 2017, Johnston was Writer-in-Residence at Wolff Cottage (the Center for the Writing Arts) in Fairhope, Alabama.

In July 2018, Johnston was named to a task force asked to make recommendations to the Halifax Regional Municipality regarding the commemoration of British colonial governor of Nova Scotia, Edward Cornwallis, and of the commemoration of Indigenous history within the municipality. That task force report was submitted to HRM mayor, council and staff in May 2020.

Johnston's most recent book is a young adult novel, Into the Wind, A Novel of Acadian Resilience, published by Acorn Press.

== Authored and co-authored books ==
=== Fiction ===
- Johnston, A.J.B. (2023). Into the Wind. ISBN 978-1-773661-2-54.
- Johnston, A.J.B. (2018). Something True. ISBN 978-1-9802412-2-5.
- Johnston, A.J.B. (2018). The Hat. ISBN 978-1-9802319-4-3. EPUB 978-1-7752289-0-5
- Johnston, A.J.B. (2015). Crossings, A Thomas Pichon Novel. Sydney: Cape Breton University Press. ISBN 978-1-77206-020-1. EPUB 978-1-77206-022-5, Kindle 978-1-77206-023-2, Web pdf 978-1-77206-021-8
- Johnston, A.J.B. (2014). The Maze, A Thomas Pichon Novel. Sydney: Cape Breton University Press. ISBN 978-1-897009-76-5. EPUB 978-1-927492-71-0, MOBI 978-1-927492-72-7
- Johnston, A.J.B. (2012). Thomas, A Secret Life. Sydney: Cape Breton University Press. ISBN 978-1-897009-74-1. EPUB 978-1-897009-89-5, MOBI 978-1-897009-90-1

=== History ===
==== Current English editions and re-prints ====
- Johnston, A.J.B.; Francis, Jesse (2021). Ancient Land, New Land: Skmaqn—Port-la-Joye—Fort Amherst National Historic Site of Canada. Charlottetown: Acorn Press. ISBN 978-1-773660-70-7.
- Johnston, A.J.B. (2020). Kings of Friday Night: The Lincolns. Halifax: Nimbus Publishing. ISBN 978-1-77108-848-0. ASIN : B08N1L2SKP. EPUB : ISBN 978-1-77108-849-7
- Johnston, A.J.B.; LeBlanc, Ronnie-Gilles (2015). Grand Pré, Landscape for the World. Halifax: Nimbus Publishing. ISBN 978-1-771082-71-6.
- Johnston, A.J.B. (2013). Louisbourg: Past, Present, Future. Halifax: Nimbus Publishing. ISBN 978-1-771080-52-1.
- Johnston, A.J.B.; Francis, Jesse (2013). Ni'n na L'nu: The Mi'kmaq of Prince Edward Island. Charlottetown: Acorn Press. ISBN 978-1-894838-93-1.
- Johnston, A.J.B. (2007). Endgame 1758. The Promise, the Glory and the Despair of Louisbourg's Final Decade. Lincoln: University of Nebraska Press. ISBN 978-1-897009-20-8. (Canada), ISBN 978-0-8032-6009-2 (USA)
- Johnston, A.J.B. (2004). Storied Shores: St. Peter's, Isle Madame and Chapel Island in the 17th and 18th Centuries. Sydney: University College of Cape Breton Press. ISBN 978-1-897009-00-0.
- Johnston, A.J.B.; Kerr, W.P. (2004). Grand-Pré, Heart of Acadie. Halifax: Nimbus Publishing. ISBN 978-1-55109-479-3.
- Johnston, A.J.B. (2001). Control & Order: The Evolution of french Colonial Louisbourg, 1713–1758. East Lansing: Michigan State University Press. ISBN 0-87013-570-8.
- Johnston, A.J.B. (1996). Life and Religion at Louisbourg, 1713–1758. Montreal & Kingston: McGill-Queens University Press. ISBN 0-7735-1525-9. Paperback Edition
- Campbell, Brian; Johnston, A.J.B. (1995). Tracks across the Landscape: A Commemorative History of the S&L Railway. Sydney: University College of Cape Breton Press. ISBN 0-920336-64-7.
- Johnston, A.J.B.; Donovan, Kenneth; Balcom, B.A.; Storm, Alex (2004) [1991]. Louisbourg, An 18th-Century Town. Halifax: Nimbus Publishing. ISBN 978-0-921054-88-7.
- Johnston, A.J.B.; Reardon, Chris (photography) (1997). Louisbourg: The Phoenix Fortress. Halifax: Nimbus Publishing. ISBN 0-921054-35-1. Paperback Edition
- Dunton, Hope; Johnston, A.J.B. (1986). From the Hearth: Recipes from the World of 18th-Century Louisbourg. Sydney: University College of Cape Breton. ISBN 0-920336-01-9.
- Johnston, A.J.B. (2002) [1983]. The Summer of 1744, A Portrait of Life in 18th-Century Louisbourg. Ottawa: Parks Canada. ISBN 0-660-18786-8.
- Johnston, A.J.B. (1981). Defending Halifax: Ordnance, 1825–1906. Ottawa: Parks Canada. ISBN 0-660-10842-9.

==== Previous English editions ====
- Johnston, A.J.B. (1984). Life and Religion at Louisbourg, 1713–1758. Montreal & Kingston: McGill-Queens University Press. ISBN 0-7735-0427-3. Hardcover Edition
- Johnston, A.J.B.; Reardon, Chris (photography) (1990). Louisbourg: The Phoenix Fortress. Halifax: Nimbus Publishing. ISBN 0-921054-51-3. Hardcover Edition

==== Non-English editions and translations ====
- Johnston, A.J.B.; Francis, Jesse (2014). Ni'n na L'nu : Les Mi'kmaq de l'île-de-Prince-Édouard. Tracadie-Sheila: La Grande Marée. ISBN 978-2-349-72315-4.
- Johnston, A.J.B.; Buttiens, Michel (tr) (2011). 1758 : La finale. Promesses, splendeur et déolation de la dernière décennie de Louisbourg. Québec: Les Presses de l'Université Laval. ISBN 978-2-7637-9060-2. ISBN 9782763710600
- Johnston, A.J.B.; Kerr, W.P.; Filion, Sylvain (tr) (2004). Grand-Pré, Coeur de l'Acadie. Halifax: Nimbus Publishing. ISBN 978-1-551094-91-5.
- Johnston, A.J.B. (1988). La religion dans la vie à Louisbourg (1713–1758). Ottawa: Environnement Canada. ISBN 0-660-92278-9.
- Johnston, A.J.B.; Reardon, Chris (photography); Pichette, Robert (tr.) (1997). Louisbourg, Reflets d'une époque. Halifax: Nimbus Publishing. ISBN 1-55109-210-7. Paperback Edition
- Johnston, A.J.B.; Reardon, Chris (photography); Pichette, Robert (tr.) (1997). Louisbourg, Reflets d'une époque. Halifax: Nimbus Publishing. ISBN 1-55109-206-9. Hardcover Edition
- Johnston, A.J.B. (2002) [1983]. L'été de 1744: La vie quotidienne à Louisbourg au XVIIIe siècle. Ottawa: Parcs Canada. ISBN 0-660-96662-X.
- Johnston, A.J.B. (1981). La défense d'Halifax : Artillerie, 1825–1906. Ottawa: Parcs Canada. ISBN 9780660906645.
