= Prince Darling =

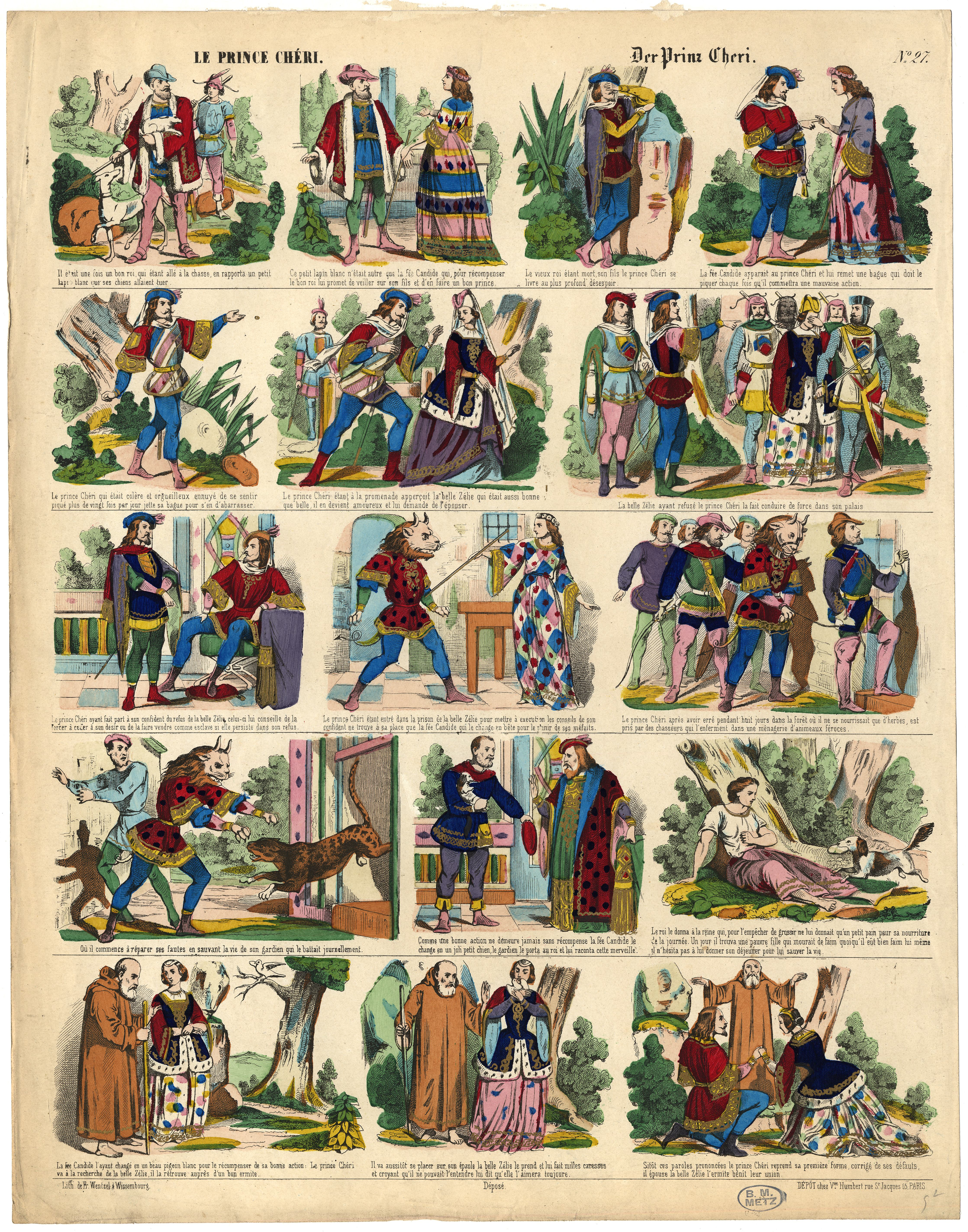
Le Prince Chéri

Prince Darling (Prince Chéri) is a French literary fairy tale written by Madame Jeanne-Marie Leprince de Beaumont.

== Translations ==
Andrew Lang included a version named Prince Darling in his Blue Fairy Book. He listed the origin of the tale as Le Cabinet des Fées.

An English language translation, by Laura Valentine, named it Prince Cherry, in The Old, Old Fairy Tales.

Author and dramatist James Planché translated the tale as Prince Chéri. He noted that the tale was corrupted as Prince Cherry in English compilations and suggested the tale has some "Oriental" provenance, due to names such as Suleiman and Zélie.

== Synopsis ==
An aged king who is a widower lavishes indulgence on his only son, who the people consequently call "Prince Darling." He fears he will die before the child is of age and confesses his concern to his friend, the Fairy of Truth. The fairy promises to grant the boy a boon such as beauty, wealth or military success, but the king asks only that the fairy make the boy a good person. The fairy says she cannot change the boy's character, but she can give him advice and correct him when he errs.

After the king's death, the fairy appears to Prince Darling, now the king, and gives him a magic ring that will prick his finger whenever he do something bad or wrong. Prince Darling continues to follow the instructions of his wise old mentor, Suleiman, but begins carousing at night with power-seeking sycophants who encourage his bad behaviour. Prince Darling meets a young shepherdess and arrogantly announces to her that he will marry her. Instead of being honoured, the shepherdess refuses because of Prince Darling's wicked reputation. The sycophants tell him that if he won't punish subjects who disobey him, his power will dissolve and the people will depose him. By this time Prince Darling has discarded the magic ring because it was almost constantly pricking him. So he puts the shepherdess in prison to force her consent to the marriage. When she mysteriously vanishes from her cell, the sycophants accuse Suleiman of freeing her, and that he is trying to undermine Prince Darling's authority and take over the kingdom. Prince Darling then imprisons Suleiman.

At this time the fairy of truth again appears to Prince Darling in a rage, saying that because he did not heed the ring's gentle correction he has become a monster. She transforms him into a creature with a head of a lion, the horns of an ox, the feet of the wolf, and a body of a snake. The fairy tells him that as ugly as she can make him, his soul is still a hundred times more hideous. She disappears, and the creature is left alone in the woods to ruminate on the error of his ways.

The monster prince is captured by a hunter, who hopes to sell him as a curiosity. On the way back to the town, they encounter a reveller who says the whole town is rejoicing because Prince Darling is dead. He says the people have released Suleiman from prison and crowned him as the new king. Prince Darling sees this as a confirmation of everything his flattering friends said, and roars in rage. The hunter decides to take the monster to the new king as a coronation gift.

The hunter takes the monster prince to the coronation ceremony where they hear Suleiman announce that he is only taking the throne in trust for Prince Darling, who is not dead and will return one day. The hunter presents the monster to the king, who puts it in his menagerie. In his cage, Prince Darling observes that the animal keeper is a drunkard who abuses the animals. Prince Darling reflects that he was wrong about Suleiman, who only has his best interests in mind. He realizes that his friends were really the ones manipulating him and seeking power, and the prince resolves to do only good from now on. When the animal keeper has a near-fatal accident, the prince monster breaks out of his cage to save him. The Fairy of Truth appears momentarily, saying that good actions will be rewarded, and transforms him from the horrible monster into a dog.

The animal keeper takes the dog to King Suleiman to report that a miracle has happened. Suleiman's daughter takes a liking to the dog and decides to keep him herself. One morning the dog receives a spare breakfast of one dinner roll, which he takes out in the countryside. As he roams, he discovers a house of splendour, made of jewels. There are well-dressed people going into the building, but when they come out, they are thin and pale, wearing rags and apparently starving to death. One young girl crawling out of the palace passes the dog, and attempts to eat a blade of grass. The dog decides to give his roll to the girl. The girl tells the dog not to go in the house, because it is the Palace of Pleasure, and all the food is poisoned. The dog sees the shepherdess entering the palace and is desperate to save her. At this time, the Fairy of Truth appears and rewards his generosity by turning him into a dove. The dove prince flies around the palace, and through a window he sees the shepherdess, who suddenly vanishes in a puff of smoke. Resolving to find her, the dove flies all across the land. Eventually he spies her in a remote place, walking with an old beggar woman in rags. He flies down and lights on the shepherdess' finger, cooing. She remarks that it is the most beautiful dove in the world and that if it were a man, she would marry it. The beggar woman throws off her rags and reveals that she is the Fairy of Truth. She transforms the dove back into Prince Darling. The Prince kneels and begs the shepherdess for forgiveness. The fairy declares that the girl had always loved the prince, but didn't like his bad behaviour. Prince Darling and the shepherdess are then married, and Prince Darling resumes the throne to become a just and beloved ruler. He once again wears the ring on his finger, but it never pricks him.

== Adaptation ==
An episode of The Adventures of Rocky and Bullwinkle and Friends adapts the tale in the Fractured Fairytale segment.
