= Jeanne-Marie Leprince de Beaumont =

French author (1711–1780)

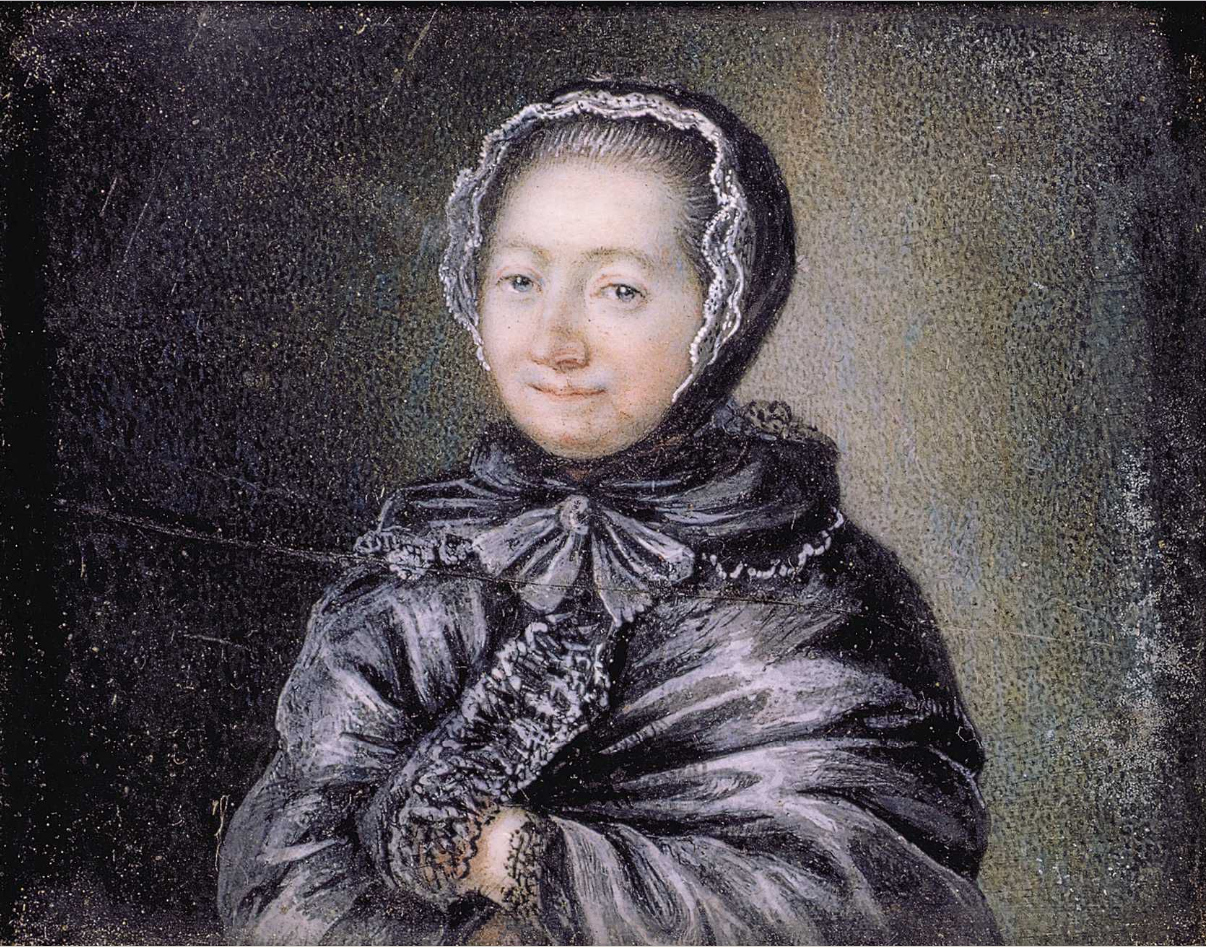
- Portrait of de Beaumont, c. 1750
- Born: Marie-Barbe Le Prince; 26 April 1711; Rouen, France
- Died: 8 September 1780 (aged 69); Avallon, France
- Occupation: Novelist
- Spouse: Grimard de Beaumont (m. 1743–1745)
- Partner: Thomas Pichon (1750s–1763)
- Relatives: Jean-Baptiste Le Prince (half-brother); Prosper Mérimée (great-grandson)

Jeanne-Marie Leprince de Beaumont (French: [ʒan maʁi ləpʁɛ̃s də bomɔ̃] ^{ⓘ}; 26 April 1711 – 8 September 1780) was a French writer who wrote the best-known version of Beauty and the Beast, an abridged adaptation of the 1740 fairy tale by Gabrielle-Suzanne Barbot de Villeneuve. Born to a middle-class family, she was raised alongside her younger sister, Catherine Aimée. Both were provided education at a convent school and stayed on as teachers. Rather than remain and take her vow as a nun, she left for Metz, France, and became a governess for a prominent family in a court in Lunéville. As a long-time educator, she became well known for her written works on behavior and instructional teaching for young women. Her interest in the genre of education contributed to her inclusion of fairytales to teach moral behavior.

Although she was a successful writer for her time, her works as a pedagogue sometimes shadowed her publishing on topics of socio-political issues. Within many of her other works, she discussed reform for the roles of women in society. She urged women to become active political participants by providing them with literary instruction on how to become instrumental citizens.

Her contributions to children's literature and the folklore genre have gained her popularity and influence as a female writer of the eighteenth century.

== Life and work ==
Christened as Marie-Barbe Le Prince, she was born in 1711 in Rouen, France, the eldest daughter of Jean-Baptiste Le Prince, a sculptor and painter, and his second wife Barbe Plantart. Having lost her mother when she was eleven years old, she and her younger sister, Catherine, were subsequently mentored by two wealthy women who enrolled them in a convent school at Ernemont in Rouen. Upon completing their educations, they remained there as teachers from 1725 to 1735. In 1735, instead of taking her vow as a nun, she left the convent school and settled in Metz, France where her father was staying with his third wife.

De Beaumont then obtained a prestigious position as a singing teacher to the children at the Court of the Duke of Lorraine, Stanisław Leszczyński, at Lunéville. After her time as a teacher in Lunéville, she left France to become a governess in London. During this time, she wrote many original works of fiction and nonfiction. Her first work, the moralistic novel, The Triumph of Truth (Le Triomphe de la vérité), was published in 1748. She published approximately seventy volumes during her literary career. Most famous were the collections titled "Le Magasin des infans", published in 1758, which included her version of "Beauty and the Beast". Following this collection, she published "Le Magasin des adolescents" in 1760, "Instructions pour les jeunes dames" in 1764, and "Les Amèricaines" in 1770. All of these works were written as instructional handbooks for parents and educators of students from childhood through adolescence, mostly for young females. She also wrote for other audiences like boys, artists, and people living in poverty or rural areas. She was one of the first to include folktales as a moralist and educational tool in her writings. Her interest in folktale led to the writing of her abridged version of Beauty and the Beast, originally called, La Belle et la Bête, adapted from Gabrielle-Suzanne Barbot de Villeneuve's original. This version was published in 1757 and is considered the more popular version of the classic tale.

De Beaumont also wrote several novels, such as Lettres de Madame du Montier and Memoires de Madame laBaronne de Batteville, both published in 1756. Then, she published Civan, roide Bungo, histoire japonnoise ou tableau de I'education d'un prince all in 1758. Lastly, The New Clarissa: A True History was published in 1768 and Lettres d'Emerance a Lucie in 1774. The New Clarissa: A True History was a novel she wrote as a reply to the original novel Clarissa: Or The History Of A Young Lady by Samuel Richardson. In her version, the lead female character maintained more control over her life and individual freedom.

She published the magazine Le Nouveau Magasin français, ou Bibliothèque instructive et amusante between 1750 and 1752, and contributed articles to the British newspaper The Spectator during her years in London. De Beaumont has been identified as a likely inventor of the jigsaw puzzle during her time in England; her use of 'wooden maps' to teach children is referred to in letters of 1759 and 1762, predating the widely circulated idea that cartographer and mapseller John Spilsbury was the first inventor of puzzles in 1766. After a successful publishing career in England, she left the country in 1763 and returned to France. She lived first in Savoy, near the city of Annecy, then moved to Avallon near Dijon in 1774 (see her personal letter #21 dated 22 December 1774 to Thomas Tyrrell) until her death in 1780.

== Personal life ==
Her first marriage was in 1743 to the dancer, Antoine Grimard de Beaumont. Shortly after, she bore a daughter, named Elisabeth. In 1745, her relationship with de Beaumont ended, through annulment or separation, but kept his name. There is some discrepancy with records of her marital history. Including an account of marriage in 1737 to Claude-Antoine Malter, a famous French dancer in the well-known Malter family. However, most sources acknowledge her marriage in 1743 as her first. She is cited as having an adventurous youth and much of her romantic history is not well documented. Before marriage, she supported herself through work until her publishing career began.

During her time among the royal courts, de Beaumont communicated regularly with influential social figures, such as Emilie du Châtelet and Françoise de Graffigny. Both women published works of their own after de Beaumont's first publications. She also exchanged discussions of ideology with Voltaire, who became a frequent contributor to her Nouveau Magasin Français. Voltaire would respond with letters, essays, poems and other correspondences throughout 1760–1770. Her position as a governess and writer within higher society in England and France gained her exposure to people of educated and successful reputations within her fields of interest. Being an educated woman, de Beaumont was provided opportunities to build the success of her career as a writer.

While in London, she met Thomas Tyrell, originally known as Pichon but who had to change his name once he was exiled from France. Tyrell worked with British intelligence and there is evidence that he and de Beaumont lived together until she returned to France with only her daughter Elisabeth and son-in-law Nicolas Moreau. Most of her life after returning to France is documented in her letters to Tyrell from 1763 to 1775, which are kept at the municipal library in Vire, France.

She made her final move to Avallon before her death. De Beaumont was known to travel often while spending her last decades in France, including trips to Paris and Spain. She was survived by her daughter, Elisabeth, son-in-law Nicolas Moreau, and six grandchildren, one of which would later give birth to her great-grandchild, Prosper Mérimée.

== Beauty and the Beast ==
De Beaumont's version of the classic fairy tale, Beauty and the Beast, which was first published in 1756, was reinvented from the original text by Gabrielle-Suzanne Barbot de Villeneuve, first published in 1740. Both tales begin with a wealthy merchant who has several sons and daughters. Once he loses his fortune, they all must go to live in a small house far away from the city. The youngest daughter, Beauty, is said to be beautiful and intelligent; she is contrasted by her other sisters who are spoiled and spiteful. When their father offends the Beast in the forest, Beauty volunteers to repay the offense by returning to the Beast's home and remaining with him. At the Beast's castle, she is treated like a queen. Each night, the Beast asks her to be his bride, but she consistently refuses. They grow to understand each other over time and become fond of each other's company. When Beauty asks to return home to visit her family, the Beast agrees. Beauty states she will return after two months. When she forgets to return within the promised time, the Beast begins to die from the sadness of losing her. Beauty returns to him and confesses her love by agreeing to marry the Beast. The Beast transforms into a prince, and Beauty discovers he was enchanted by a terrible curse.

The biggest difference between both tales is how de Beaumont uses dialogue to incorporate moral lessons to educate young readers. For example, at the end of the tale in de Beaumont's version, both of Beauty's cruel sisters were punished to live as stoned statues until they had accepted their flaws. De Beaumont had a clear understanding that fairytales are a helpful tool to teach young readers about life lessons without them knowing. For her, fairytales were a productive way to disguise learning moments while children were engaged in the extraordinary elements of folklore. Her version's popularity and common acknowledgment as the "original" Beauty and the Beast are credited to its reduced length. De Beaumont shortened Villeneuve's version by a considerable amount. Her ability to reinvent other published works of folklore with moralized considerations and publish them within an easily condensed collection helped in building a widespread reception of her works around Europe. The tale of Beauty and the Beast has been reimagined for centuries, since its first publishing. This long-lasting tale demonstrates the power of retelling in keeping stories alive.

== In fiction ==
Because of her relationship in London with the French spy Thomas Pichon (1700–1781), she is a character in a novel entitled Crossings : A Thomas Pichon Novel, by A. J. B. Johnston. However, in that fictional appearance, the dates for her relationship with Pichon are not accurate.

== Works ==
- Civan, roi de Bungo: Histoire japonnoise ou tableau de l'éducation d'un prince. Slatkine. 1998. ISBN 978-2-05-101683-4. (1st edition 1758)
- Jeanne-Marie Leprince de Beaumont (1983). La Belle et la Bête. Illustrator Willi Glasauer. Gallimard Jeunesse. ISBN 978-2-07-053881-2.

=== Fairy tales ===
- Magasin des enfants
- Le Prince Chéri (Prince Darling)
- La Curiosité (The Curiosity)
- La Belle et la Bête (Beauty and the Beast)
- Le Prince Fatal et le Prince Fortuné (Prince Fatal and Prince Fortune)
- Le Prince Charmant (Prince Charming)
- La Veuve et ses deux filles (The Widow and her Two Daughters)
- Le Prince Désir (Prince Hyacinth and the Dear Little Princess)
- Aurore et Aimée (Aurore and Aimée)
- Conte des trois souhaits (The Tale of the Three Wishes)
- Conte du pêcheur et du voyageur (The Tale of the Fisherman and the Traveler)
- Joliette
- Le Prince Tity (Prince Tity)
- Le Prince Spirituel (Prince Spirituel)
- Belote et Laidronette (Belote and Laidronette)
- Morlock te Money (Morlock te Money)
