= Gabrielle-Suzanne Barbot de Villeneuve =

French author (1685–1755)

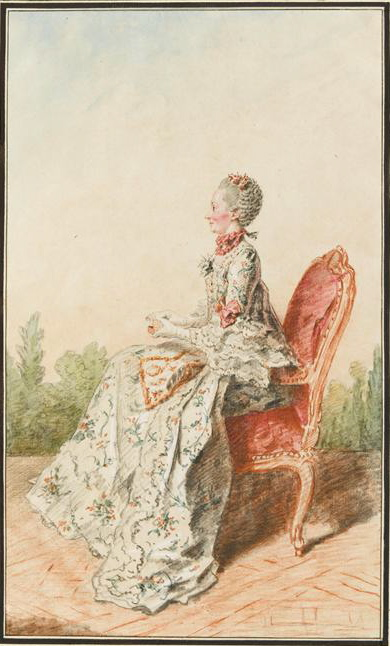
- Portrait of de Villeneuve, 1759
- Born: Gabrielle-Suzanne Barbot; 28 November 1685; Paris, France
- Died: 29 December 1755 (aged 70); Paris, France
- Occupation: Novelist
- Spouse: Jean-Baptiste de Gaalon de Villeneuve (m. 1706; died 1711)

Gabrielle-Suzanne Barbot de Villeneuve (28 November 1685 – 29 December 1755) was a French author influenced by Madame d'Aulnoy, Charles Perrault, and various précieuse writers. Villeneuve is particularly noted for her original story of La Belle et la Bête, which was published in 1740 and is the oldest known variant of the fairy tale Beauty and the Beast.

== Biography ==
Gabrielle-Suzanne Barbot was born and died in Paris. She belonged to a powerful Protestant family from La Rochelle and was a descendant of Amos Barbot, a Peer of France and a deputy in the Estates General in 1614. His brother, Jean Amos, became mayor of La Rochelle in 1610. Another relative, Jean Barbot (1655-1712), was an early explorer of West Africa and the Caribbean, and worked as an agent on slave ships. He published his travel journals in French and English after he migrated to England to escape the persecution of Protestants after Louis XIV revoked the Edict of Nantes in 1685.

In 1706, Gabrielle-Suzanne Barbot married Jean-Baptiste de Gaalon de Villeneuve, a member of a noble family from Poitou. Within six months of their marriage, she requested a separation of property from her husband, who had already squandered much of their substantial joint inheritance. A daughter was born, but no records indicate if she survived. In 1711, Gabrielle-Suzanne became a widow at the age of 26. She lost her fortune and was forced to seek employment to support herself. Eventually, she made her way back to Paris, where she met Prosper Jolyot de Crébillon, or Crébillon père, the most famous writer of tragedies of the period. It is likely that she began living with Crébillon père in the early 1730s, although the earliest documented date is 1748. She remained with him until her death in 1755 and assisted him with his duties as the royal literary censor. She thus became knowledgeable about the literary tastes of the Parisian reading public.

== Major works ==
Gabrielle-Suzanne Barbot de Villeneuve published both fairy tales and novels. Her publications include a novella, Le Phénix conjugal (1734, The Conjugal Phoenix); two collections of fairy tales, La Jeune Américaine, et les Contes marins (1740) and Les Belles Solitaires (1745); and four novels, Le Beau-frère supposé (1752), La Jardinière de Vincennes (1753, The Gardener of Vincennes), Le juge prévenu (1754, The Biased Judge), and Mémoires de Mesdemoiselles de Marsange (1757, Memoirs of Mlles de Marsange). La Jardinière de Vincennes was considered her masterpiece and gave her her greatest commercial success. The Bibliographie du genre romanesque français 1751-1800 lists 15 editions of this novel.

=== Beauty and the Beast ===
Gabrielle-Suzanne Barbot de Villeneuve is particularly noted for her original story of La Belle et la Bête, which was published in her La jeune américaine, et les contes marins in 1740, and is the oldest known modern variant of the fairy tale Beauty and the Beast. This book, which is as long as a conventional novel, was influenced by the style of 17th-century novels and contains many subplots or intercalated stories, one of which is the story of Beauty and the Beast. The Beast is "bête" in both senses of the French word: both a beast and lacking in intelligence. After her death, Villeneuve's tale was abridged, rewritten, and published by Jeanne-Marie Leprince de Beaumont in 1756 in her Magasin des enfants to teach young English girls a moral lesson. In her widely popular publication, Leprince de Beaumont gave no credit to Villeneuve and thus she is often wrongly referred to as the author of the tale. Her shortened version is the one most commonly known today.

The Beast, a prince, loses his father at a young age. His mother has to wage war to defend his kingdom, and leaves him in the care of an evil fairy. This fairy attempts to seduce him when he reaches adulthood. He rejects her and she transforms him into a beast. He must remain in this form until someone agrees to marry him without knowing his past. In a neighboring kingdom, Beauty is the daughter of a king and a different fairy. Beauty's mother has broken the laws of fairy society by falling in love with a human, so she is sentenced to remain in the fairy land and Beauty is sentenced to marry a hideous beast when she grows up (the same beast that the prince was turned into). After Beauty's mother disappears, the evil fairy unsuccessfully attempts to take Beauty's life and marry her father. Beauty's aunt, another good fairy, intervenes and exchanges Beauty for the dead daughter of a merchant. She also places the Beast in a magically hidden castle until Beauty grows old enough to meet him.
