= Katharine McLennan =

Katharine McLennan (1892 – December 8, 1975) was a Canadian who served her community through volunteerism during World War I, in supporting the reconstruction of the Fortress of Louisbourg National Historic Site, and in aiding community organizations.

== Early life and upbringing ==
Katharine's father, John Stewart "J.S." McLennan (1853–1939), was a Montreal-born industrialist, historian and publisher who first came to Cape Breton Island to manage the early coal and steel industries of the area. He married artist Louise Ruggles Bradley of Chicago in 1881, and together they welcomed five children into the world - Frances, Isabel, Hugh, Margaret, and Katharine.

By 1898, J.S. moved the young McLennan family to Sydney, Nova Scotia, permanently. They lived in several residences during these early Cape Breton years, including Havenside in Louisbourg and Brookdale in South Bar.

During this time, Katharine was educated by private tutors and through travel. She studied art in Paris with Percyval Tudor-Hart and spent time researching the Fortress of Louisbourg with her father, who would later write the seminal text, Louisbourg From Its Foundation to Its Fall. The family suffered a terrible loss when Louise was stricken with appendicitis and died at the age of 51 on February 27, 1912 leaving Katharine, the family's only unmarried daughter, with the responsibility of becoming the lady of the house.

== World War I ==
Shortly after her brother was killed in battle near Ypres, Katharine McLennan decided she wanted to join other young women overseas as a nurse's aide in the military hospitals. Her father, however, would not hear of his youngest daughter tending to sick and dying soldiers. Frustrated by his refusal, Katharine enlisted the help of her sisters to convince him to let her go to France with the Red Cross Society, the Secours aux Blessés Militaires. J.S. eventually relented and she headed overseas in the spring of 1916.

Katharine's first commission was in Hospital de l'Alliance in Yvetot from May 10 to December 28, 1916, followed by Hôpital Auxiliaire No.109 in Pont-Audemer from January 18 to September 18, 1917. From there she was transferred to Vasseny at a hospital referred to only as HOE 18; she was there from October 13, 1917 to February 28, 1918. Katharine took a break in the spring and early summer of 1918, but returned to France to Pontoise and the Hôpital Militaire, Caserne de Cavaliere from July 16 to November 11, 1918. She also spent time in a German hospital in Langenschwalbach from January to May 1919.

Her friends, Edith Parkman and Helen Homans, were her constant companions at work and her sightseeing partners on breaks. Her letters home are filled with descriptions of her daily activities, amusing stories, touching reminiscences of the wounded soldiers, and questions and comments about people back home. Katharine had developed an interest in photography and she kept scrapbooks of the haunting images she took of her experiences in France. Many of her photographs are now part of the McLennan collection and are kept at the Cape Breton Regional Library.

The brutality and cruelty of the war was disturbing to her however, and this comes through in the sketches she made of the soldiers in the hospitals. As the war dragged on, Katharine's correspondence expressed a tiredness with the situation and more specifically, with the lack of trained nurses.

Katharine would continue to make use of her nursing experience following the war, serving local Red Cross and Victorian Order of Nurses chapters in Cape Breton.

== Service at the Fortress of Louisbourg ==
Like her father, Katharine McLennan was passionate about history. Since her mother's death in 1912, she has supported her father in his research about the history of the Fortress of Louisbourg, especially during the 18th century, and used her travels to London, Paris, Boston, and Ottawa, to gather information to that effect. The research efforts of Katharine and her father included visiting archives of Canada, France, Britain, and copying documents by hand, including sketching with precision the maps and plans of the fortress.

After the end of World War I and her return from Europe, Katharine joined a group of local supporters, including her father and the local Archdeacon, to ask the federal government to protect the Fortress's historical site. Katharine also raised funds towards the creation of a museum about Louisbourg, and gathered artifacts from the French period to be exhibited in the museum, such as a cannon retrieved at Halifax and the Louisbourg bells. These efforts resulted in the creation of the Louisbourg Museum in 1936. In the site's brochure, entitled "A Short History of Louisbourg", she articulates her commitment to the museum in these words: "The museum was built in the belief that a visual memorial is a necessary adjunct to a living past, and it is far more illuminating than the most eloquent words."

For over twenty years, Katharine served as "Honorary Curator" of the museum - in a later interview, she jokingly cautions listeners against the assumption that "honorary" means that she never does any work. Instead, her volunteer work included cataloguing the museum's possessions and supervising further acquisitions, organising exhibitions and events such as commemorative ceremonies, but also writing or giving talks about the history of Louisbourg. To this day, the detailed scale model of the Fortress's site, which she constructed, remains a valued item in the collection.

John Lunn, former Superintendent of Louisbourg, commented on Katharine's role in the restoration of the Fortress of Louisbourg. "Single handedly," he said, "she founded and financed the Louisbourg Museum and was the active curator for 20 years. For many more years she was a member of the Committee for Restoration and in her lady-like way she persisted with the authorities until something was done."

While working for the museum, Katharine also lobbied the federal government to allocate funding for the restoration of the fortress, true to her father's vision. Her efforts unlocked a commitment of twenty million dollar in 1961, and the restoration started. Katharine remained deeply involved throughout the restoration, visiting the site, investigating the work being done, engaging in conversations with the men and providing her expertise about the history of the site, and entertaining the experts working on the project at her Sydney home.

== Other community involvement ==
In addition to her work at Louisbourg, Katharine became involved with the Cape Breton Regional Library Board, the Victorian Order of Nurses, and the Red Cross. She was a founding member of the Old Sydney Society and an ardent supporter of the Cape Breton Miners' Museum and St. Patrick's Church Museum. For her service, she was given many honors by organizations such as the National Library Association, the Business and Professional Women’s Club of Sydney, and the Sydney Centennial Commission. Katharine was also invested as an Officer of the Order of Canada and received an honorary doctorate from St. Francis Xavier University.

== Legacy ==
Katharine McLennan's contributions to her community and nation were recognized through the creation of Through Her Eyes: Katharine McLennan, a virtual exhibit featuring the photographs, textual records, and artwork that Katharine accumulated throughout her lifetime. The launch of the exhibit coincided with the inaugural presentation of the Katharine McLennan Award to John C. O'Donnell. The award, which recognizes the exceptional contributions of an individual who has, through community, life, and volunteer work, made a significant and lasting difference in the area(s) of arts, culture and/or historical preservation of Cape Breton Island, will be presented to an individual who has exhibited leadership, integrity, social responsibility and a willingness to serve community throughout their life each year.

In 2017, Katharine McLennan was one of the individuals chosen to be included in the Nova Scotia Museum's exhibit entitled VANGUARD: 150 Years of Remarkable Nova Scotians. In 2018, historian and novelist A. J. B. Johnston released a work of biographical fiction in which Katharine McLennan is the central character. That novel is called Something True.
