= Ernst Heinrich Meier =

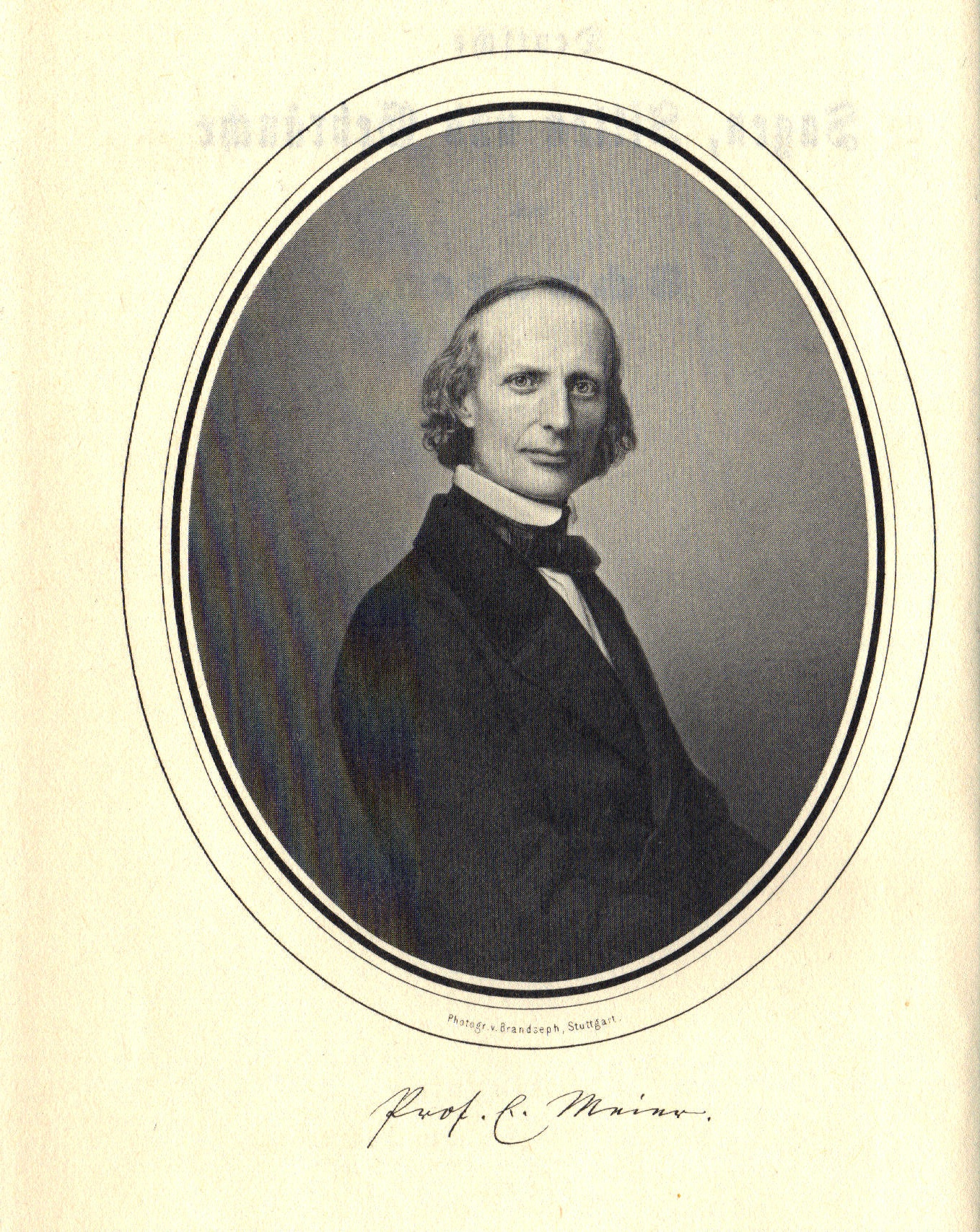
Ernst Meier

Ernst Heinrich Meier (17 May 1813 in Bückeburg – 2 March 1866 in Tübingen) was a German orientalist. He published an Indian play, Sakuntala or the Lost Ring. He also published a collection of German folk songs.

Meier collected coins. His collection was purchased by the University of Tübingen.
