= A Change in Me =

1998 Toni Braxton song

Song by Susan Egan

from the album So Far
- Released: March 19, 2002
- Genre: Pop
- Length: 3:49
- Label: JAY Productions Ltd.
- Composer: Alan Menken
- Lyricist: Tim Rice
- Producer: Craig Barna

"A Change in Me" is a song written by composer Alan Menken and lyricist Tim Rice for the musical Beauty and the Beast, a stage adaptation of Disney's 1991 animated film of the same name. The song was written specifically for American singer Toni Braxton when she joined the production to play the role of Belle in 1998, four years into the musical's run. Menken and Rice wrote "A Change in Me" to appease Braxton after Rice promised the singer, who was hesitant to sign her contract, that he would write an entirely new song for her to perform in the musical on the condition that she finally agree to play Belle.

Appearing during the show's second act, Belle sings "A Change in Me" to her father Maurice after reuniting with him to explain how much she has matured and changed for the better while she was imprisoned at the Beast's castle. Immediately popular among critics and audiences, the pop ballad has been positively received since Braxton debuted it, remaining part of the show's set list ever since. Actress Susan Egan, who originated the role of Belle in 1994, recorded the first studio version of "A Change in Me" in 2002 for her debut studio album So Far; her cover was the song's first English-language recording.

== Background ==
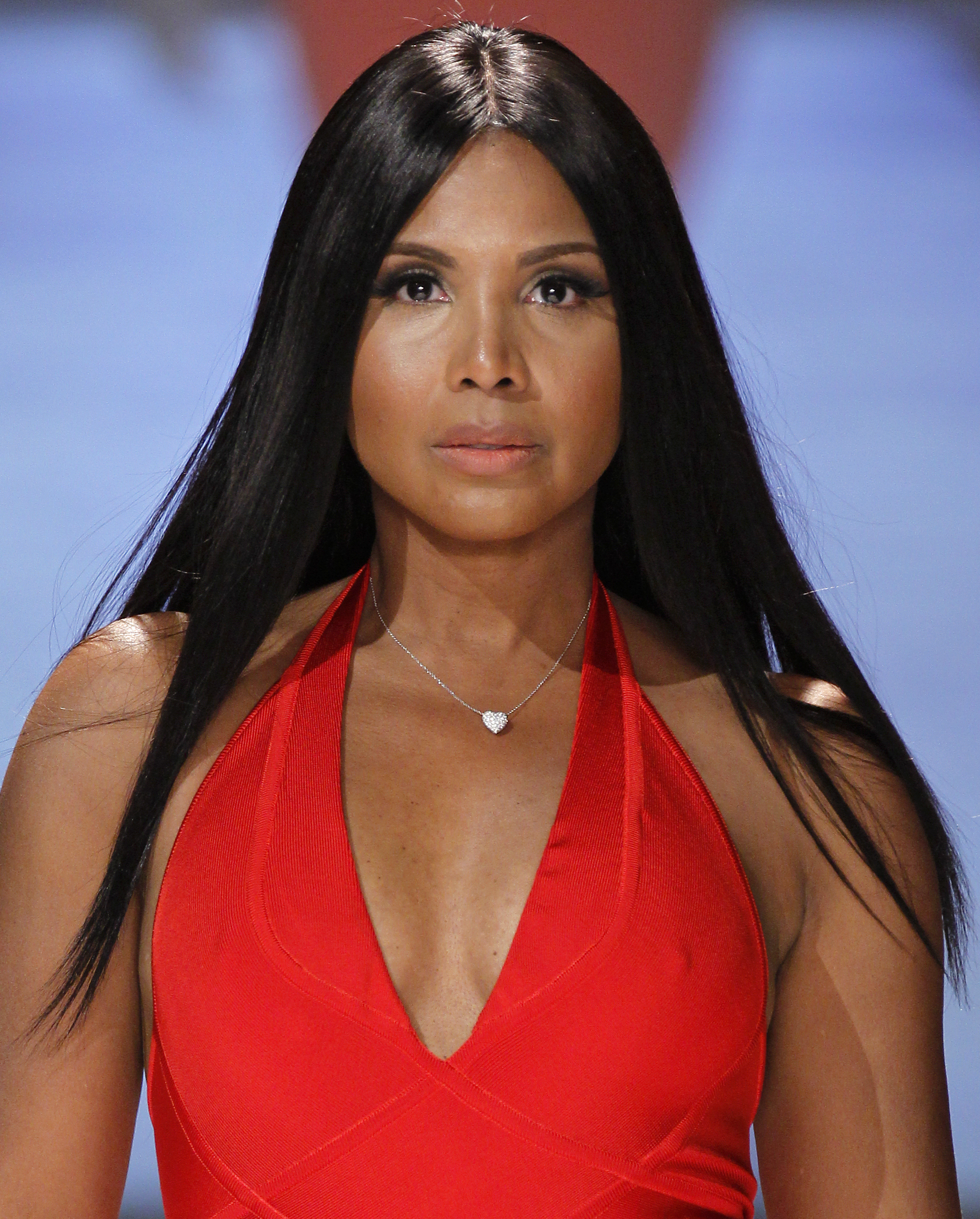
"A Change in Me" was written specifically for R&B singer Toni Braxton to convince her to accept the role of Belle.

Composer Alan Menken and lyricist Tim Rice had already written six original songs for the stage adaptation of Beauty and the Beast, most of which focus on character development, including a solo for Belle entitled "Home". In July 1998, American R&B singer Toni Braxton entered final negotiations to make her Broadway debut as Belle in Beauty and the Beast, replacing actress Kim Huber in the role. Despite having initial reservations due to the singer's reputation as a sex symbol, director Robert Jess Roth eventually concluded that Braxton would offer an "interesting" interpretation of Belle after first meeting with her to discuss the role and observing similarities between Braxton's own personality and the character's. Once Roth forwarded his approval of the singer's casting to Disney, the studio began collaborating with Braxton's management on developing a contract stipulating that the singer would appear in the show for a three-month period. However, various circumstances resulted in Braxton continuously delaying to sign the contract until she met for dinner with Menken, Rice and choreographer Matt West; Roth was out of town at the time and unable to attend due to scheduling conflicts.

A few days after their dinner, Braxton telephoned Roth to confirm that she had finally signed the contract; this was the first time Roth learned that Rice had apparently promised Braxton that he would write an entirely new song for her to sing in the musical if she agreed to sign the paperwork. Panicked, Roth immediately contacted Rice, who confirmed that he had in fact agreed to write a song for Braxton, blaming himself for having consumed too much alcohol during their dinner. Rice asked Roth to allow him 24 hours to review the musical and see if there was in fact a moment for which he and Menken could develop a new song, and decided to write a ballad for the second act during which Belle tells Maurice how she has changed during her stay in the Beast's castle. "A Change in Me" was written four years into Beauty and the Beast's run. In addition to being the first black performer to portray Belle on Broadway, Braxton was the first African-American woman to star in a leading role in a Disney production across any medium.

== Context and composition ==
"A Change in Me" is considered to be among the musical's original songs that both advance its storyline and provide character development; "A Change in Me" specifically allows Belle to further explore and elaborate on her newfound feelings for the Beast, adding dimension to their relationship. The song also further empowers Belle, expanding upon her dimension as a character. Appearing during the show's second act, the ballad is performed by Belle to indicate that her feelings towards the Beast have softened. Delivered simply, she explains to her father Maurice that she no longer longs for the things she had wished for earlier in Act 1's "Belle (Reprise)", revealing just how much her time spent in the Beast's castle has transformed both her identity and perspective. Belle claims that she has evolved into a better person as a result of having gotten to know and ultimately fallen in love with the Beast, the same individual she once viewed "with abhorrence and dread". Forced to confront feelings she has never felt before, Belle tries to convince Maurice that the Beast is not the monster he thinks he is while explaining how much she has matured. According to Joey Guerra of the Houston Chronicle, "A Change in Me" "encapsulate[s] the show's sweet emotion." Vladimir Bunoan of ABS-CBNnews.com felt that the ballad "signal[s] a break in [Belle and the Beast's] relationship".

"A Change in Me" was originally published in the key of D major, performed at a slow tempo. A "belty" pop ballad often performed within "a plaintive register", its lead vocal spans two octaves, from E_{3} to F_{5}. Like most of the musical's songs, the melody of "A Change in Me" is borrowed from the film's orchestral score. The New Jersey Monthly summarized "A Change in Me" as "a soaring number about how adventure comes in many forms." Beginning, "There's been a change in me a kind of moving on though what I used to be", the song was identified by author Thomas S. Hischak as a delicate, "moving ballad". Lyrically, the song is "about being at peace with oneself and how it's expected as you grow up." It has also been described as "uplifting", featuring the lyrics "I never thought I'd leave behind / My childhood dreams / But I don't mind / I'm where and who I want to be". The chorus ends "Now I love the world I see / No change of heart–a change in me". Vocally, "A Change in Me" is considered to be one of the musicals two "most commanding ballads", alongside "Home", another song Belle performs in the production.

== Reception and impact ==
When Braxton debuted "A Change in Me" during her opening night at the Palace Theatre on September 9, 1998, critics and audiences immediately praised the addition of the new song and Braxton's performance overall. The Drama Review wrote, "As she approached the chorus of 'A Change in Me,' Braxton let loose a vocal wail that seemed to send a shuddering rush through to the back of the audience." Braxton subsequently performed the song live on The Rosie O'Donnell Show on October 7, 1998. Braxton was costumed in Belle's dress, while the stage was decorated to resemble a star-lit foggy night. Describing Braxton as "angelic", BroadwayBox.com called her performance "absolutely stunning." Disney executive Michael Eisner, who attended Braxton's first show, was so pleased with the ballad that he decided "A Change in Me" should be written into every other production of Beauty and the Beast that was running at the time. Roth spent the next month personally traveling to several different cities, where he taught the song to the various companies. Establishing itself as an "irreplaceable spotlight" and "crowd pleaser", "A Change in Me" has remained part of the show's set list ever since Braxton's departure in February 1999. Braxton would go on to star in Disney's Broadway musical Aida.

The ballad has continued to receive praise in subsequent iterations of Beauty and the Beast, particularly touring and regional productions. The Lodi News-Sentinel dubbed "A Change in Me" one of the musical's "new favorites". Tamara Ikenberg of the Alaska Dispatch News described the song as "a gorgeous, revelatory piece". The New Jersey Monthly called the ballad a musical highlight. Individual performers are often commended for their renditions. Bob Curtright of The Wichita Eagle complimented actress Jillian Butterfield's "clear soprano" for "captur[ing] the right moods" on musical numbers such as "A Change in Me". In a separate review of Beauty and the Beast for the same publication, Curtright called the ballad "absolutely lovely." The Seattle's Child's Kelly Rogers Flynt wrote, "Not only does the song help the storyline, it also gives Jillian Butterfield a chance to shine." Jennifer Perry, writing for Maryland Theatre Guide, called actress Emily Behny's rendition "very memorable and displays her sweet soprano and strong belt." In the Fayetteville Flyer, Michelle Parks called actress Hilary Mailberger's voice "particularly gorgeous on 'A Change in Me'". Michael Grossberg of The Columbus Dispatch agreed that Mailberger's rendition "is a second-act highlight". Contributing to Silverkris, Rachel AJ Lee wrote that the actress' "strong and harmonious voice ... shone" during "A Change in Me". Gale Shapiro of the South Florida Insider deemed "A Change in Me" actress Brooke Pointanas' "best spot" in the entire show.

The Houston Chronicle's Everett Evans described "A Change in Me" as a "serviceable ballad". In a less positive review, Morgan Halaska of the Twin Cities Daily Planet felt that the ballad only "unravels everything Belle is supposed to be in its attempt to explain Belle's motive to ditch her dreams for a dude", concluding, "She comes off as weak, nothing like the strong, independent woman she embodied in Act I." L. Nicholls, writing for the Edmonton Journal, dismissed "A Change in Me" as a "sappy pop ballad", although he commended Butterfield's vocal performance.

== Cover versions ==
Since "A Change in Me" was introduced four years into Beauty and the Beast's run, the song has not yet been included on any official English-language cast albums. However, it has been recorded for the 2005 Manila, 2008 Madrid and 2009 Barcelona original cast recordings of the musical by various actresses in their native languages. It has since been covered by several artists. Actress Susan Egan, who originated the role of Belle when the show premiered in 1994, had already long left the production by the time "A Change in Me" was introduced. She covered the song for her debut studio album So Far in 2002. Arranged and produced by Craig Barna, Egan's version of "A Change in Me" was the first English-language studio recording of the song.

In her role as Kristen, actress Ashley Brown performed the song in the jukebox musical Disney's On the Record in 2005, which also appears on the original cast recording. Brown would eventually play Belle in the Broadway production of Beauty and the Beast, performing "A Change in Me" several times during her tenure. Brown also sang the song live in the concert "The Originals: Disney on Broadway" at the D23 Expo in 2015. Actress Anneliese van der Pol performed the song on Live with Regis & Kelly in 2007, shortly before the musical closed on Broadway. Actress Kissy Simmons covered the song live on the Disney Wonder cruise ship as part of the Disney Theatrical Group's concert series Stars Set Sail in 2016. Although Disney decided against using any songs from the stage musical in their 2017 live-action adaptation of the film, "A Change in Me" is briefly referenced during Belle's (Emma Watson) solo in the original song "Days in the Sun". Watson's contribution shares similar themes with "A Change in Me".
