= On the Record (musical) =

- Original US touring logo
- Music: Various; arranged by David Chase
- Lyrics: Various
- Book: Chad Beguelin
- Basis: Revue of various Disney songs
- Productions: 2004 US Tour

On the Record (sometimes referred to as Disney's On the Record) is a jukebox musical revue featuring many classic songs from a variety of live action and animated films and television series produced by Walt Disney Pictures, Broadway musical plays produced by Walt Disney Theatrical, and even Disneyland attractions. This theatrical celebration of 75 years of Disney music tells the story of four singers recording a greatest hits album in a magical recording studio. After opening in Cleveland in 2004, the production toured for nine months, visiting 24 cities in the United States before closing in Denver in mid-2005.

== Production development history ==
Following the successful stage productions of Beauty and the Beast, The Lion King, and Aida, Walt Disney Theatrical began to brainstorm a way to showcase Disney's wide catalogue of songs without the use of a movie screen to present them. The result was When You Wish, a new revue that, though intended to ultimately to play on Broadway, failed to make it past the workshop stage, despite having Tony Award-winning actress Faith Prince attached to the project.

Instead, Walt Disney Theatrical president Thomas Schumacher, along with director and choreographer Robert Longbottom, conceived a new show meant specifically for the road: On the Record, which would tell a very simple story of four recording artists in a studio. Though the developers of the production originally planned to create more complex characters and greater tension between them in the studio, they instead eventually "watered down" the plot for more general revue entertainment, because, says Longbottom, the "songs were from so many different character points of views, [that one] couldn't begin to create a book musical that would allow them to coexist."

After the basic concept of the show had been developed, musical arranger and supervisor David Chase joined the project. Collaborating with Longbottom, Chase delved through Disney's music canon to extract songs that would showcase the personality of the characters and would be able to tell the story without spoken words. Designers Robert Brill, Gregg Barnes, and Natasha Katz took on the task of creating a classy show with modest design elements, so the production would be able to travel easily.

After technical elements of the show began to come together, casting auditions were held in June 2004 around the country, including New York City and Cleveland. Broadway veterans Emily Skinner and Brian Sutherland were cast as the older, more experienced couple of recording artists, while newcomers Ashley Brown and Andrew Samonsky were cast in the roles of the newer musicians. Richard Easton received the role of the Sound Engineer, a part that was ultimately cut from the show. Kaitlin Hopkins, as the only actor to regularly replace one of the original four leads, took over Skinner's role as Diane on January 15, 2005. In its 36-week tour, On the Record was performed for over 350,000 people, opening on November 19, 2004 at Cleveland, Ohio's Palace Theater and closing July 31, 2005 at Denver, Colorado's Denver Center for the Performing Arts. While the production was originally planned to run through September 4, after playing to disappointing, small audiences, the production ultimately decided on an earlier closing date after only two months on the road. There are currently no plans for either Equity or non-Equity licensing of the production.

In April 2009, the show saw new life in the form of Children's Musical Theater of San Jose's production of When You Wish, a separate revue based on On the Record. Adapted by the theater's artistic director, Kevin Hauge, When You Wish, much unlike its basis, tells the story of three children who stumble upon a fantasy world in which they meet many beloved Disney characters. While When You Wish abandons the recording studio setting, it incorporates On the Record's same catalog of 71 years of Disney music. Later in 2014 White Plains Performing Arts Center presented the regional premiere of the production in its original form with a few new additions to the production.

=== Original touring company ===
Diane	Emily Skinner
Julian	Brian Sutherland
Kristen	Ashley Brown
Nick	Andrew Samonsky

=== Regional Premiere (White Plains PAC) ===
Diane	Paulette Oliva
Julian	Joseph Bellino
Kristen	Triona O'Callaghan
Nick	Devin Lewis

== Synopsis ==
On the Record, like most revues, involves characters that express their personalities and emotions with the use of song, rather than speech. In this case, the characters tell the show's simple, almost non-existent plot through selections of Disney music. The story is one of a love rectangle between four recording artists, including reigning pop diva Diane, matinee idol Julian, and the fresh faces on the music scene Kristen and Nick, recording a Disney compilation album. Upon entering the studio, Kristen instantly develops a crush on teen heartthrob-to-be, Nick, though Nick initially denies any attraction. Meanwhile, Julian attempts to rekindle an apparent ex-relationship with Diane but is often interrupted by his unrequited love's flirtation with the younger talent. As the show comes to an end, though, Diane comes back to Julian, remembering how precious their time together had once been. Nick, in turn, learns to embrace love and professes that he will always be there for Kristen.

== Music ==
Emily Skinner as Diane and Andrew Samonsky as Nick sing the Aladdin classic "A Whole New World" in Session 4, the portion of the show featuring songs about flight. (Photograph by Joan Marcus.)

Musical numbers in On the Record are performed by the previously mentioned four principal characters, as well as a separate, unnamed quartet, and an eight-member orchestra. While the show is often advertised as a collection of 64 Disney songs, there are actually 71, with three of them reprised. Hardly any song, however, is performed in its entirety. Under the musical adaptation and arrangement by David Chase, songs also take different twists on their original counterparts from film or stage. "Be Our Guest" especially drifts from the original film version in that it is sung in a surplus of different languages. Julian sings a portion of the song in French, Diane sings in German, Kristen sings in Japanese, Nick sings in Swedish, and the company sings other portions in English and other languages. "The Work Song", however, hardly drifts from the original version at all, digitally altering the characters' voices to imitate those of Cinderella's mice.

The 75 years of Disney music represented in the revue dates back to "Minnie's Yoo-Hoo" from a 1929 Mickey Mouse short called Mickey's Follies, with the recent selection being "Will the Sun Ever Shine Again" from the 2004 film Home on the Range. On the Record includes a total of eight Academy Award for Best Song winners: "When You Wish Upon a Star" from Pinocchio, "Zip-A-Dee-Doo-Dah" from Song of the South, "Under the Sea" from The Little Mermaid, "Beauty and the Beast" from Beauty and the Beast, "A Whole New World" from Aladdin, "Can You Feel the Love Tonight" from The Lion King, "Colors of the Wind" from Pocahontas, and "You'll Be in My Heart" from Tarzan. The catalogue of music does not only come from the screen, however, but also from such Disneyland attractions as It's a Small World and The Enchanted Tiki Room, both with songs by Disney's prolific songwriter brother duo, Richard and Robert Sherman. Also performed in the musical is composer Alan Menken's "A Change in Me" — a song written for Toni Braxton when she entered the role of Belle in the Broadway production of Beauty and the Beast.

The songs are grouped into 15 recording sessions, as well as a prologue, finale, and a collection of instrumentals played after curtain call as the audience exits the theater, with each section's songs holding a unifying theme. Some sessions contain themes such as falling in love, while others may contain songs made up of entirely nonsense words, or even numbers about foreign cuisine. More often than not, songs within a session are presented in the form of a medley, leading directly into one another, without a break between them.

Released to stores on March 15, 2005, the cast recording, featuring the entire original cast, excluding Emily Skinner and including Kaitlin Hopkins, received decent reviews. Produced by Walt Disney Records, the two-disc set with a total of 45 tracks was mostly acclaimed for the talent of the cast and the timelessness of the Disney favorites. Because the show contains very little dialogue, the two discs are a recording of nearly the entire show. Furthermore, since the show's plot involves the characters recording an album of Disney's greatest hits, the cast album is effectively the resulting compilation.

=== Prologue ===
- A Dream is a Wish Your Heart Makes (Cinderella)
- Whistle While You Work/Give a Little Whistle (Snow White and the Seven Dwarfs and Pinocchio)

=== Session 1 ===
- Can You Feel the Love Tonight/I Won't Say (I'm in Love)/Let's Get Together/Belle (The Lion King, Hercules, The Parent Trap, and Beauty and the Beast)
- Someday My Prince Will Come/Once Upon a Dream (Snow White and the Seven Dwarfs and Sleeping Beauty)

=== Session 2 ===
- The Walrus and the Carpenter/I Wanna Be Like You (Alice in Wonderland and The Jungle Book)
- Prince Ali (Aladdin)
- I Just Can't Wait to Be King/Lavender Blue (The Lion King and So Dear to My Heart)
- When She Loved Me (Toy Story 2)

=== Session 3 ===
- Minnie's Yoo-Hoo (Mickey's Follies)
- Heigh-Ho (Snow White and the Seven Dwarfs)
- The Work Song (Cinderella)
- I'm Wishing/One Song (Snow White and the Seven Dwarfs)

=== Session 4 ===
- You Can Fly! You Can Fly! You Can Fly! (Peter Pan)
- So This Is Love (Cinderella)
- A Whole New World (Aladdin)
- The Second Star to the Right (Peter Pan)

=== Session 5 ===
- Under the Sea (The Little Mermaid)
- Part of Your World (The Little Mermaid)
- Poor Unfortunate Souls (The Little Mermaid)
- Kiss the Girl (The Little Mermaid)

=== Session 6 ===
- Reflection (Mulan)

=== Session 7 ===
- Bella Notte/Les Poissons (Lady and the Tramp and The Little Mermaid)
- Ev'rybody Wants to Be a Cat/The Siamese Cat Song/The Tiki Tiki Tiki Room (The Aristocats, Lady and the Tramp, and Walt Disney's Enchanted Tiki Room)
- He's a Tramp (Lady and the Tramp)

=== Session 8 ===
- Higitus Figitus/Bibbidi-Bobbidi-Boo/Supercalifragilisticexpialidocious/Hi-Diddle-Dee-Dee/Following the Leader/Zip-A-Dee-Doo-Dah/The Dwarfs' Yodel Song (The Silly Song)/Hakuna Matata/Mickey Mouse March (The Sword in the Stone, Cinderella, Mary Poppins, Pinocchio, Peter Pan, Song of the South, Snow White and the Seven Dwarfs, The Lion King, The Mickey Mouse Club)

=== Entr'acte ===
- Let's Go Fly a Kite (Mary Poppins)

=== Session 9 ===
- I Will Go Sailing No More/Just Around the Riverbend/Strangers Like Me (Toy Story, Pocahontas, and Tarzan)
- Colors of the Wind (Pocahontas)

=== Session 10 ===
- "When I See an Elephant Fly" (Dumbo)
- "Look Out For Mister Stork" (Dumbo)
- "Pink Elephants on Parade" (Dumbo)
- "Baby Mine" (Dumbo)

=== Session 11 ===
- The Bells of Notre Dame (The Hunchback of Notre Dame)
- Out There (The Hunchback of Notre Dame)
- Something There/Beauty and the Beast (Beauty and the Beast)
- A Change in Me (Beauty and the Beast: The Broadway Musical)

=== Session 12 ===
- Be Our Guest (Beauty and the Beast)

=== Session 13 ===
- Will the Sun Ever Shine Again (Home on the Range)

=== Session 14 ===
- You've Got a Friend in Me (Toy Story)
- If I Never Knew You (Pocahontas)
- You'll Be in My Heart (Tarzan)

=== Session 15 ===
- When You Wish Upon a Star (Pinocchio)
- A Dream is a Wish That Your Heart Makes (reprise) (Cinderella)

=== Finale ===
- The Bare Necessities (The Jungle Book)
- A Spoonful of Sugar (Mary Poppins)
- It's a Small World (It's a Small World)

=== Exit Music ===
- Mickey Mouse March (Mickey Mouse Club)
- Colonel Hathi's March (The Jungle Book)
- Cruella De Vil (101 Dalmatians)
- A Spoonful of Sugar (Mary Poppins)
- Winnie the Pooh (Winnie the Pooh and the Honey Tree)
- I've Got No Strings (Pinocchio)

== Credits ==
Many composers and lyricists are credited as working on this project, inasmuch as their songs are included in the show:

- Al Hoffman
- Al Rinker
- Alan Menken
- Allie Wrubel
- Bob Hilliard
- Carl Stalling
- David Zippel
- Eliot Daniel
- Elton John
- Floyd Huddleston
- Frank Churchill
- Glenn Slater
- Howard Ashman
- Jack Lawrence
- Jerry Livingston
- Jimmie Dodd
- Larry Morey
- Leigh Harline
- Mack David
- Matthew Wilder
- Ned Washington
- Oliver Wallace
- Peggy Lee
- Phil Collins
- Randy Newman
- Ray Gilbert
- Sherman Brothers
- Sammy Cahn
- Sammy Fain
- Sonny Burke
- Stephen Schwartz
- Ted Sears
- Terry Gilkyson
- Tim Rice
- Walt Disney
- Winston Hibler

== Response ==
In the revue, Ashley Brown, starring as the ingénue Kristen, sings two of Alan Menken's pop ballads: "Part of Your World", "A Change in Me", and Matthew Wilders' "Reflection". (Photograph by Joan Marcus.)

During its nine-month run, On the Record received mixed reviews. Regional theatre reviewer Ann Miner commented in her review of the production that the gimmicks giving new twists to the classic songs, including monkey imitations in The Jungle Book's "I Wanna Be Like You" and glow-in-the-dark microphone cords in The Little Mermaid's "Poor Unfortunate Souls", translated poorly to stage. Pittsburgh Post-Gazette writer Christopher Rawson felt as though the attempt to create a storyline was too forced and that the show should have taken a general revue route by completely scrapping the plot. While Rawson described the production as "unimpressive", he, among others, felt that the eight-member cast was talented.

== Aftermath ==
The revue proved to be the beginning of Ashley Brown's relationship with Disney's theatrical department. After receiving positive reviews for her performance as Kristen, Brown landed the role of Belle in Beauty and the Beast on Broadway on September 20, 2005. After completing her run as Belle on May 28, 2006, Brown opened the Broadway production of Mary Poppins on November 16, 2006, in the title role — a performance which earned her a Drama Desk Award nomination for Outstanding Actress in a Musical. Brown ended her Broadway run on October 5, 2008, but subsequently returned to the role, opening the North American national tour of Mary Poppins in Chicago on March 25, 2009. Meredith Inglesby, who served as a member of the quartet and as Diane's understudy, also found success with Disney Theatrical Productions, landing the roles of Babette the feather duster in the same production of Beauty and the Beast and later, Carlotta in the Broadway production of The Little Mermaid. She can be seen as Hannah in the North American tour of Newsies. Also, Tyler Maynard of the quartet has gone on to work with Walt Disney Theatrical, both in Mary Poppins as Valentine and, subsequently, in The Little Mermaid as Flotsam.
