= Sarah Litzsinger =

American actress and singer

Sarah Litzsinger is an American actress and singer, best known for her career in musical theatre.

== Life and career ==
Litzsinger appeared in Marilyn: An American Fable and in the Broadway revival of Oliver!, alongside Patti LuPone. She also was in the ensemble of Les Misérables, understudying the roles of Cosette and Eponine. She went on to star as The Narrator in the Canadian production and U.S. national touring companies of Joseph and the Amazing Technicolor Dreamcoat, with Donny Osmond. On December 2, 2000, she took over the role of Belle from Andrea McArdle in the Broadway production of Beauty and the Beast after playing it on the national tour and understudying the role on Broadway for a year. After playing Belle full-time for nearly two years she left the show August 2002 and was succeeded by Jamie-Lynn Sigler. In August 2002, Sarah went right into rehearsal for Michel LeGrand's Amour on Broadway. She originated the role of Madeleine in the French musical fable. After Amour closed, Litzsinger returned to the role of Belle on February 11, 2003.

In 2006, she played Eva Peron in the 25th U.S. national tour of Evita.

From May 30 – September 17, 2006, she once again appeared in Disney's Beauty and the Beast replacing Ashley Brown as Belle. Litzsinger holds the distinction of being Broadway's longest-running Belle.

In 2004, Litzsinger released a self-titled solo album.

She is also a member of the band TASTiSKANK, along with another Broadway actress, Kate Reinders. In 2007, they won the Breakout Award at the HBO Aspen Festival. They were also voted as two of the 25 Sexiest New Yorkers by the New York Post. Tastiskank performed their act at the 2008 TBS Comedy Festival in Las Vegas. Reinders and Litzsinger co-starred opposite Constantine Maroulis in an independent TV pilot called Teachers which aired at the fourth annual New York Television Festival.

In 2010, Litzsinger received a Wilde Award "Best Actress in a Musical" for her portrayal of Mrs. Lovett in Sweeney Todd, and most recently played 'Peter Pan' in Peter Pan at Alabama Shakespeare Festival.

== Stage credits ==
- Beauty and the Beast – Broadway (Belle)
- Evita – U.S. tour (Eva Peron)
- The Last Five Years – George Street Playhouse (Cathy)
- tick, tick...BOOM! – George Street Playhouse (Susan)
- "A Year with Frog and Toad" -Minneapolis Children's Theatre (Bird/Mouse)
- Falsettos – George Street Playhouse (Cordelia)
- Amour – Broadway (Madeleine)
- Joseph and the Amazing Technicolor Dreamcoat – U.S. tour, Canada (Narrator)
- Les Misérables – Broadway (Cosette/Eponine u/s)
- Marilyn: An American Fable – Broadway (Young Norma Jean u/s)
- Oliver! – Broadway (Bet)
- Little Shop of Horrors – The Encore Musical Theatre Company, in Dexter, Michigan (Audrey)
- Oklahoma! – The Encore Musical Theatre Company (Ado Annie)
- Sweeney Todd: The Demon Barber of Fleet Street – The Encore Musical Theatre Company (Mrs. Lovett)
- Peter Pan (1954 musical) – Alabama Shakespeare Festival (Peter Pan)
- "Next to Normal" Milwaukee Rep (Diana)
- “Beetlejuice (musical)” North American Tour (Delia)

== Television credits ==
- Law & Order: Criminal Intent (episode: "Grow") – 2005
- Ed (episode: "The World of Possibility) – 2000
- Strangers with Candy (episode: "Who Wants Cake?") – 1999
- Perry Como's Christmas in New York She and Como visit a toy store and sing a duet of "Talk to the Animals. — 1983
- Law & Order (episode: "Forgiveness")
