= Sea Beast =

2008 American television monster movie

- DVD Cover
- Genre: Horror
- Written by: Paul Ziller; Neil Elman
- Directed by: Paul Ziller
- Starring: Miriam McDonald; Corin Nemec; Daniel Wisler; Gary Hudson; Christie Laing; Roman Podhara; Brandon Jay McLaren
- Theme music composer: Chuck Cirino
- Country of origin: United States
- Original language: English

Production
- Executive producers: Peter von Gal; Kirk Shaw; Lindsay MacAdam; Paul Hertzberg; Lisa Hansen
- Producer: Breanne Hartley
- Cinematography: Mahlon Todd Williams
- Editor: Gordon Williams
- Running time: 87 minutes
- Production companies: Syfy; Insight Productions; CineTel Films; Muse Entertainment; NBC Universal Television

Original release
- Release: June 30, 2008

Sea Beast, also known as Troglodyte, is a 2008 Canadian-American television monster movie starring Miriam McDonald, Daniel Wisler, Brandon Jay McLaren and Corin Nemec. It is the sixteenth film in the Maneater film series and it was released on DVD on June 30, 2009.

== Plot ==
Will is fishing with his crew in a thunderstorm. As they try to pull the fishing net in, a wave hits the ship, and one crew member, Joey, is suddenly spat in the face, attacked, dragged into the sea, and killed by an invisible creature. The mysterious creature attaches itself to the bottom of the boat.

Back at the village, a funeral is held for Joey. Will finds slime on his boat where Joey was taken. Two of Will's crew, Danny and Drew, secretly plan to go to a nearby island with their girlfriends Carly (Will's daughter) and Erin. Because of work, Drew plans to join the others the next day but is devoured at the dock by the hideous beast attached to the boat.

The next day, Will and Arden look for Drew but find his severed arm in the water. They also find slime on the platform of the dock. Back on the island, Carly finds Erin on the beach waiting for Drew. After Carly leaves, Erin sees the boat drifting away. She goes to pull the rope back in but is spat on and paralyzed by the beast and then killed. Will confronts Ben, who lost a crewman the same way Will did, asking him to tell the people what he really saw.

While gathering firewood, Danny is startled when a smaller beast suddenly appears. It bites him on the hand when he tries to take a picture of it. Will meets Arden, who tells him the slime is a toxin. As they discuss the beast, they are interrupted by the beast killing two teenagers. Will gives chase, but it escapes. Danny and Carly go to retrieve the first aid kit from the boat but find the boat missing. Danny suspects that Erin took it to confront Drew, so Sheriff Jay, Roy, and two other men organize a hunting party but are killed by the beast. Arden goes scuba diving to investigate the situation and finds an egg laid by the beast that has already hatched. She concludes that there are more eggs.

Danny and Carly find Erin's corpse and flee back to the cabin. The smaller beasts attack them at the cabin. They manage to kill a few of the beasts on the second floor. A swarm of them appears downstairs, so they lock themselves in the bathroom. Will and Arden find the hunting party slaughtered. Barbara, the harbormaster, radios Will and tells him that Ben is setting a trap on the dock, using himself as bait. Danny and Carly make a break for it when the coast is clear but are ambushed by a lone beast which Danny manages to kill as it attacks Carly. Will and Arden head back to find Barbara's headless body lying on the dock platform and Ben killed by the beast's venom. Will discovers that Ben tagged the beast with a GPS tracker and that it is heading for the island.

Carly and Danny flee from the cabin to an abandoned ferry to check if they can radio for help. The beast realizes they are inside and calls for the smaller beasts. Will and Arden go to save them. When they find Danny, who is about to lead them to Carly, the beast kills him. Meanwhile, Carly kills the smaller beasts that tried to attack her. She escapes and rejoins Will and Arden. They find a nest filled with eggs. The mother beast attacks them, but Will holds it off while Carly and Arden flee from the ferry. The creature attacks Will, but he survives and blows up the ship, exterminating all the beasts and the eggs. Will, Carly, and Arden decide to start their own fishing business, ending the film.

== Cast ==
- Corin Nemec as Will McKenna
- Miriam McDonald as Carly McKenna
- Daniel Wisler as Danny (as Daniel James Wisler)
- Camille Sullivan as Arden James
- Gwynyth Walsh as Barbara
- Brent Stait as Ben
- Gary Hudson as Sheriff Jay McKenna
- Christie Laing as Erin
- Brandon Jay McLaren as Drew
- Douglas Chapman as Joey
- Roman Podhora as Roy (as Roman Podhara)
- Brock Johnson as Hunter 1
- Brad Kelly as Hunter 2
- Lea Kovach as Witness

== Release ==
=== Home media ===
The film was released on DVD by RHI Entertainment on June 30, 2009. RHI later re-released the film on May 11, 2010, as a part of a three-disk Maneater Series movie pack.

== Reception ==
Dread Central awarded the film a score of 2.5 out of 5, calling the film "unimaginative", and wrote, "Never a total bore yet never anything more than what it is, which isn’t much." Andrew Smith from Popcorn Pictures gave the film a score of 3/10, writing, "Some of the Sci-Fi Channel’s aquatic horrors have been reasonably entertaining... but this one is just scraping the barrel. Sea Beast stoops to a new low of ridiculousness and tedium that will be pretty hard to beat." Christopher Monfette from IGN gave the film a score of 4/10, writing, "Sea Beast is a terrible movie, but at the very least, it's fun. Sci-Fi Channel fun. Cheesy, B-movie fun. It aspires to nothing and makes no pretense of being anything other than a gory, cornball homage to the underwater creature feature. It's the kind of movie worthy of a drunken night indoors, laughing with friends as you openly mock the TV screen."
