= Daniel Wisler =

American actor (born 1980)

- Born: Daniel James Wisler; September 10, 1980 (age 45); Fairfield, Ohio, United States
- Occupation: Actor
- Years active: 2005–present
- Spouse: Ashley Brown (2011-present)

Daniel James Wisler (born September 10, 1980) is an American actor, best known for his recurring role in the television series The Unit, in which he played Jeremy Erhart, an Army veteran. He appeared in six episodes.

Wisler has also appeared in other films and television series, and starred in the 2008 TV film Troglodyte, as Danny, renamed Sea Beast in 2009 as the DVD title.

== Filmography ==
Film
Year	Film	Role	Other notes
2007	Imperial Violet	Eddie Fallow	Short film
2008	A Gunfighter's Pledge	Hank	
2008	Dark Reel	Tall Man	
2008	The Day the Earth Stood Still	Army Fighter Pilot #2	USA: promotional abbreviation: D.T.E.S.S.
2008	Troglodyte	Danny	Released to DVD June 30, 2009 as Sea Beast
Television
Year	Series	Role	Other notes
2005	CSI: Crime Scene Investigation	Yak #4	"Snakes" (Season 5, Episode 12)
2006	The Unit	Jeremy Erhart	6 episodes; 2006–2007
