= Caroline Vasicek =

Austrian actress and singer (born 1974)

- Born: Caroline Vasicek; August 19, 1974; Vienna, Austria
- Occupation: Voice actress
- Years active: 1974–2003

Caroline Vasicek (born 19 August 1974 in Vienna) is an Austrian actress and singer.

== Early life ==
She studied dance, drama and musicals in Vienna under Peter Weck. Her first stage role came at age ten and her first lead at twelve year. She was the narrator in a production of Andrew Lloyd Webber's Joseph and the Amazing Technicolor Dream Coat. She played Fanny in Elisabeth (Theater an der Wien) Sandy in Grease (Vienna's Raimund Theater) and Belle in Beauty and the Beast (1995–1997).

She played the female lead role of Elena Bühringer in Franz Antel's film The Bockerer II - Austria is free. Her second film was with Charles Aznavour, Wedding in Vienna.

She performed on the Disney Musical Fantasy Gala on its Europe tour. Until the beginning of 1999 she returned to the role of Sandy Grease, this time in Düsseldorf and in its Berlin premiere (Theatre the West). For the two Disney films Arielle, the Mermaid (Austrian version) and Mulan, she sang the female lead roles. She voiced two of Ariel's sisters in the English version of the film.

She played Nannerl, Mozart's sister, in the world stage premieretofhe musical Mozart! (Theater an der Wien).

She appeared in The Bockerer III - The Bridge at Andau, German TV series Medicopter 117 and Bockerer IV. In August 2001 in Cologne she played Stephanie in Saturday Night Fever. She returned to Vienna from August to November 2002 as Sally in Me and My Girl in Baden near Vienna.

From autumn 2003, she was in the play In light candles (Theater in der Josefstadt ). In 2005 played Lucy Westenra in the musical Dracula (Municipal Theatre of St. Gallen).

She appeared in Musical Christmas in Vienna (Raimund Theater) with André Bauer, Jesper Tydén, Carin Filipcic, Jasmina Sakr and Dennis Kozeluh.

She married Boris Pfeifer in September 2006 after a seven-year partnership. The couple have one child.

== Filmography ==
- 1996: Der Bockerer II – Österreich ist frei as Elena Kolotschewa
- 1997: Sans cérémonie (TV Movie) as Puppe
- 1998: Arielle, die Meerjungfrau (Austrian version: Speaking and singing voice of Ariel) as Attina and Aquata (English)
- 1998: Mulan (German version: Singing voice of Mulan)
- 2000: Der Bockerer III – Die Brücke von Andau as Elena Bühringer
- 2001: Medicopter 117 – Jedes Leben zählt (TV Series) as Vivian
- 2003: Der Bockerer IV – Prager Frühling as Elena Bühringer
