= Beauty and the Beast (musical) =

Stage musical based on the 1991 animated Disney film

- Vocal Selections cover art
- Music: Alan Menken
- Lyrics: Howard Ashman; Tim Rice
- Book: Linda Woolverton
- Basis: Beauty and the Beast by Linda Woolverton
- Productions: 1993 Houston (tryout); 1994 Broadway; 1995 Australia; 1995 Vienna; 1995 1st US tour 1997 West End; 1999 2nd US tour 2001 1st UK tour 2001 3rd US tour 2010 4th US tour 2021 2nd UK tour 2022 West End revival 2023 Australia revival 2025 5th US tour TBA Broadway Revival
- Awards: Laurence Olivier Award for Best New Musical

Beauty and the Beast is a musical, with music by Alan Menken, lyrics by Howard Ashman and Tim Rice, and book by Linda Woolverton. Adapted from Walt Disney Animation Studios's 1991 film – which in turn was based on "Beauty and the Beast" by Jeanne-Marie Leprince de Beaumont – it tells the story of an unkind prince who has been magically transformed into an unsightly creature as punishment for his selfish ways. To revert into his true human form, the Beast must learn to love a bright, beautiful young lady who he has imprisoned in his enchanted castle and earn her love in return before it is too late.

Critics, most of whom hailed the original film as one of the finest musicals in years, instantly noted its Broadway musical potential when it was first released in 1991, encouraging Disney CEO Michael Eisner to venture into Broadway. All eight songs from the animated film were reused in the musical, including a resurrected musical number which had been cut from the motion picture. Original songwriter Menken composed six new songs for the production alongside lyricist Rice, replacing Ashman, who died during the production of the film. Woolverton, who was writing the film's screenplay, adapted her own work into the musical's libretto, and specifically expanded upon the characterization of the Beast. Woolverton expanded the storylines of the castle staff from servants who would already have been transformed into household objects referring to the 1991 animation, to have humans slowly turning into inanimate objects. Costumes were designed by Ann Hould-Ward, who based her creations on both the animators' original designs as well as the Rococo art movement after researching how clothing and household objects looked during the 18th century.

After completing tryouts in Houston, Beauty and the Beast premiered on Broadway on April 18, 1994, starring Susan Egan and Terrence Mann as the eponymous Belle and Beast, respectively. The musical opened to mixed reviews from theater critics, but was a massive commercial success and well received by audiences. Beauty ran on Broadway for 5,461 performances for thirteen years (1994–2007), becoming Broadway's sixth longest-running production in history at the time of closure. As of December 2025, it is still the eleventh longest running show. The musical has grossed more than $1.7 billion worldwide and played in thirteen countries and 115 cities. It has also become a popular choice for junior, amateur and high school productions.

== Background and inception ==
Still recovering from Walt Disney's demise, Disney's animated films continued to experience a decline in quality while struggling to attain critical and commercial success during the 1970s and 1980s from Walt Disney's death. The Walt Disney Company CEO Michael Eisner was hired to ensure the performance of the studio's next animated projects, despite having virtually no animation experience. Eisner himself had been a theater major in college. Eisner's first hire as Disney's CEO was theatrical producer Peter Schneider, who subsequently became responsible for hiring more artists who shared similar theatrical backgrounds to contribute to the studio's next animated releases, among them lyricist Howard Ashman and his long-time collaborator, composer Alan Menken. Ashman and Menken had previously amassed great live musical success with their Off-Broadway production Little Shop of Horrors, but the performance of Ashman's first Broadway venture Smile had been disappointing. Eager to redeem himself, Ashman agreed to work on Disney's animated film The Little Mermaid (1989), which he and Menken would famously decide to approach as though they were scoring a Broadway musical. Upon release, The Little Mermaid was a massive critical and commercial success, garnering two Academy Awards, both of them for Ashman and Menken's original music. Disney established a successful renaissance period, during which Ashman and Menken became responsible for teaching the art of transforming traditional animated films into animated musicals.

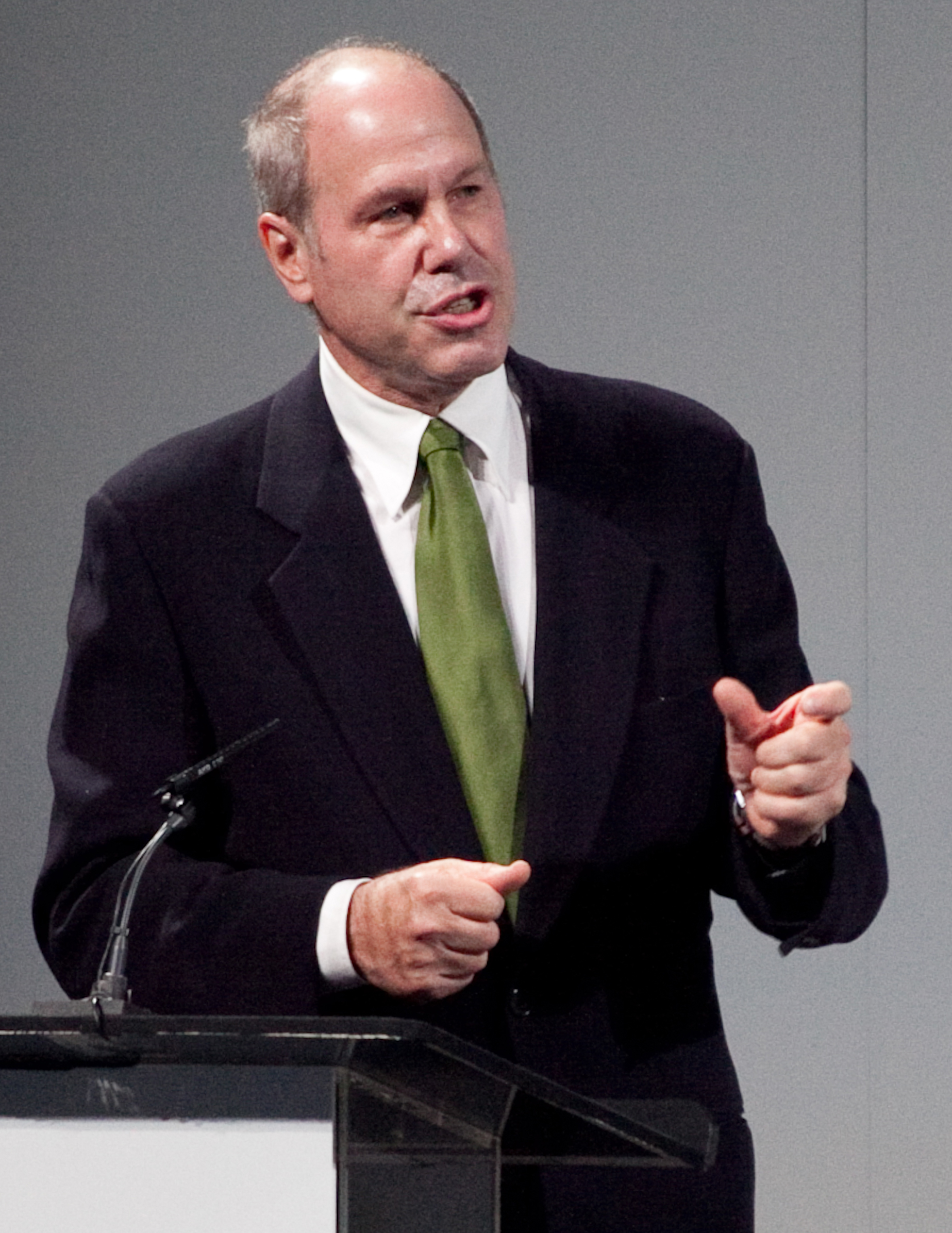
Disney CEO Michael Eisner eventually green-lit a Broadway adaptation of Beauty and the Beast.

Inspired by The Little Mermaid's success, production on an animated musical adaptation of the "Beauty and the Beast" fairy tale began shortly afterward, during which Ashman finally confessed to Menken that he was dying of AIDS, a secret he had been keeping from the studio in fear of being discriminated against or fired. Before the film had even been completed, executive vice president Ron Logan suggested to Eisner that he consider adapting Beauty and the Beast for Broadway, an idea Eisner quickly deflected. While the film, written by screenwriter Linda Woolverton, was premiering at the New York Film Festival, an ailing Ashman was being cared for at St. Vincent's Hospital; the lyricist succumbed to his disease four days later on March 14, 1991, dying eight months before the film's November release. Beauty and the Beast became the last project on which Menken worked with Ashman. The film was released to immediate critical acclaim and commercial success, outperforming The Little Mermaid by becoming the highest-grossing animated film in history, as well as the first animated film to be nominated for an Academy Award for Best Picture. Once again, Academy Awards were won for Ashman and Menken's music. Several critics noticed the film's live musical potential, among them prolific New York Times theater critic Frank Rich. Lamenting the Broadway selection at the time, Rich famously praised the songwriting duo for having written "[t]he best Broadway musical score of 1991", while hailing the film as a "better [musical] ... than anything he had seen on Broadway" in 1991. Rich's review would ultimately provide Eisner and Katzenberg with the confidence needed to seriously consider the film as a potential Broadway project. Disney was also inspired by the successes of Broadway musicals such as Cats, Les Misérables and The Phantom of the Opera strongly believing their production could be just as profitable.

Virtually unknown at the time, Robert Jess Roth was appointed the production's director based on his various successes directing live shows at the Disney theme parks. Eisner and Katzenberg had opted against hiring a more established director in order to retain creative control over the project, believing that an A-list director would likely feel more inclined to challenge their vision. Roth himself had previously pursued Eisner about investing in a Broadway show – originally suggesting a stage adaptation of Mary Poppins into a Broadway musical in 1984 – only to have his idea declined, citing cost of investment and time concerns. However, Eisner invited Roth to ask him about pursuing Broadway again in the future once he had finished directing three additional Disney theme park shows. Ultimately impressed with Roth's adaptation of The Nutcracker, Eisner finally suggested an adaptation of Beauty and the Beast, inspired by the success of a condensed stage version of the film at Disneyland, although briefly discouraged by the idea of having humans instantly transformed into inanimate objects live. Since the film had not yet been released on home video, Roth spent an entire day re-watching Beauty and the Beast in theaters while brainstorming how to present its fantastical elements onstage, and eventually worked with choreographer Matt West and set designer Stan Meyer on their own proposal, with contributions from Menken and Woolverton. In a hotel in Aspen, Roth convinced Eisner and Katzenberg to green-light a Broadway adaptation of Beauty and the Beast using a combination of 140 storyboards, costume sketches, fabric swatches and demonstrating one illusion. Eisner retained final approval over all creative elements of the production, "from the lowest chorus swing performer to the director, stars and design team." Menken was initially skeptical of Roth's qualifications, as he had never directed a Broadway show before. Meanwhile, the producers were concerned that audiences might not be interested in seeing the same story that they have enjoyed on film on the Broadway stage. Among the skeptics was theatrical producer Steven Suskin, author of Opening Night and Broadway, who argued that the production was more likely to be successful in reverse: "(The movie is) basically written as a theater piece. I'm sure it would've worked in the theater first, and it then would've worked in the movies", believing audiences would have difficulties accepting a new version of such an immensely popular work.

Beauty and the Beast became Disney's first Broadway venture, although Snow White and the Seven Dwarfs, a stage adaptation of Disney's animated film of the same name, had premiered in New York in 1979, produced by Radio City Music Hall Productions, Inc. Theatre Under the Stars' executive director Frank Young campaigned heavily to have the show open in Houston, Texas, even getting Governor Ann Richards involved in order to secure the stage rights.

== Development ==
=== Writing and screen-to-stage modifications ===
Roth summarized Beauty and the Beast as a story about "seeing past the exterior of a person and into his or her heart". Woolverton learned that Disney had commissioned her to adapt the animated film she had written into a Broadway musical while she was vacationing with her family in Maui, and her initial response to the idea was "Yikes". In the process of adapting her own animated screenplay into a full-length, two-act libretto for the stage, Woolverton contributed several distinct changes to the material, specifically instilling more emotional "depth" into each main character. The writer expanded the story by both "fleshing out" each character and allowing room for new musical numbers. Namely, Woolverton made the Beast a more threatening yet sympathetic figure; the writer expanded upon his characterization by developing the Beast into "a fuller character", aided by the addition of his own song, "If I Can't Love Her". Meanwhile, the book-loving Belle was adapted into a more headstrong and determined heroine. Belle and the Beast's relationship benefits from a new scene Woolverton wrote specifically for the stage, during which the couple read in the castle's library; Belle introduces the Beast to the tale of King Arthur and reads the book to him, to which the Beast responds by showing genuine vulnerability for the first time.

In 1993, Woolverton explained to the Los Angeles Times that "the mythology in the story would be changed to explain, for example, a 6-foot-tall candelabra." Perhaps Woolverton's most significant modification involves the enchanted objects, and the decision to have the enchantress' spell gradually transform the castle's staff of loyal servants into household objects throughout the entire duration of the musical, as opposed to having already done so immediately at the beginning. Essentially, becoming completely inanimate if the spell is not broken in time would equate to each character dying, which ultimately augments the story's drama. Consequently, this plot decision enhanced the story into a tale about people being forced to make difficult decisions, as opposed to solely a story of a man struggling to retain his humanity, in turn providing the audience with an opportunity to care about the supporting characters dramatically.

Generally, Woolverton's book remained quite faithful to the original text; the plot is essentially the same, but particular detail has been added in order to "flesh out" the story. The feather duster and wardrobe characters – only minor characters in the animated film – were broadened into fully realized supporting characters and named for the first time; Woolverton named them Babette and Madame de la Grande Bouche, respectively. Taking her job seriously, Woolverton worked relentlessly on revising the script, and often took the cast's suggestions into consideration (though not always yielding to their opinions). Despite the musical having been based on a pre-existing story by Jeanne-Marie Leprince de Beaumont, Woolverton retains a sole writing credit for her work, as the story had long lapsed into the public domain by that time.

=== Casting ===
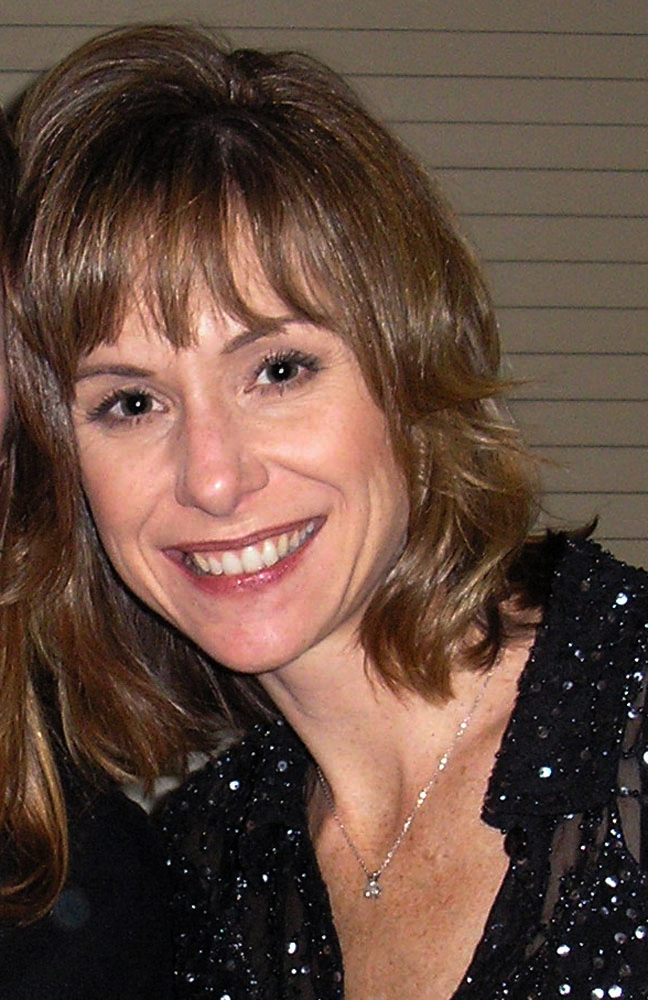
Actress Susan Egan was cast as Broadway's original Belle based on her refreshing ability to play the role both comically and as an ingénue. The role served as her Broadway debut, garnering her a Tony Award nomination.

Broadway producers are usually eager to cast big-named performers in their musicals, but Katzenberg, famous at the time for avoiding working with actors of such caliber, decided against this practice for Beauty and the Beast. Eisner concluded that most of the film's original voice actors would be too busy to reprise their roles onstage. In her Broadway debut, then-22-year-old actress Susan Egan was cast as the musical's original Belle. Egan, who had not yet seen the film, had been auditioning for several other Broadway projects at the time – namely My Fair Lady, Carousel and Grease – in which she was much more interested. Despite longing to originate a Broadway role, the actress was initially reluctant to audition for Beauty and the Beast because she thought that "it was a terrible idea for Disney to put a cartoon on Broadway." Additionally, Egan felt she was not attractive enough to play a character touted "the most beautiful girl in the village", but her agent managed to convince her otherwise. Without any film to reference, Egan determined that Belle is supposed to be a "quirky" character and approached her funnier than how she is depicted in the film, in turn garnering laughs from the producers – who were amused by her unique interpretation – and eventually earning several callbacks. Meanwhile, her competition of 500 actresses, many of whom were simply offering imitations of voice actress Paige O'Hara's original performance, continued to be eliminated.

Egan's final week of auditions, during which she sang for Menken for the first time, was particularly challenging. On her last day of auditioning, Egan auditioned opposite several actors trying out for the roles of the Beast and Gaston. As the day concluded, Roth directed Egan to approach the role as "a straight ingénue", and she was ultimately cast upon proving capable of playing Belle both straight and comically. Only afterward did Egan celebrate by finally renting and watching the entire film for the first time. Although Egan did not feel particularly pressured about the role, she was grateful to be surrounded by a supporting cast of veteran Broadway performers.

Actor Terrence Mann was cast as the Beast. Mann had previously performed as Javert in Les Misérables, for which he was nominated for a Tony Award. For his final audition for Disney management, Mann performed for a large audience comprising Disney executives and secretaries in a theater located on 42nd Street, which he felt was in stark contrast to the usual method of auditioning for six to eight people in a dark theater. Actor Gary Beach was cast as Lumiere. Beach had seen Beauty and the Beast premiere at the El Capitan Theatre, prior to which he had watched a stage rendition of the film, and thoroughly enjoyed both. Beach was particularly drawn to Jerry Orbach's rendition of "Be Our Guest" in his role as Lumiere, thinking, "Now why can't I get a part like that". Two years later, Beach received a call from casting director Jay Binder inviting him to play Lumiere during their workshop of Beauty and the Beast, but kept turning down the offer due to having prior commitments to an upcoming show starring comedian Carol Burnett. It was only at Burnett's insistence that Beach finally accepted. Amidst a cast of relatively obscure actors, Tom Bosley, famous for his roles on the television series Happy Days and Murder, She Wrote, became the show's most recognizable performer when he was cast as Belle's father Maurice.

=== Musical numbers and choreography ===
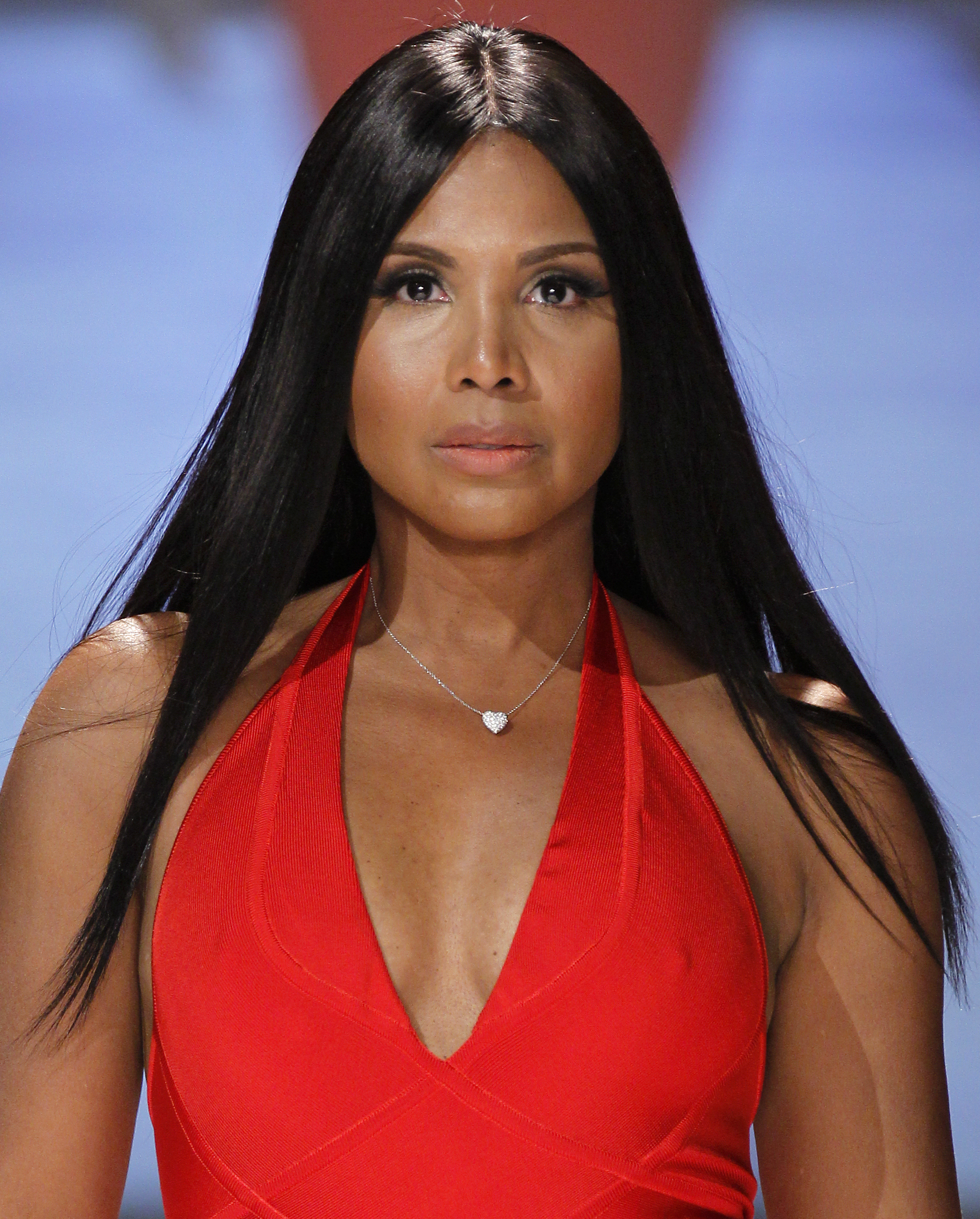
An entirely new song entitled "A Change in Me" was written specially for Toni Braxton when the R&B singer joined the production in the role of Belle in 1998, and has been included in the musical ever since.

All eight of the film's original songs were retained for the Broadway adaptation. The song "Human Again" had originally been written for the film, but it was ultimately abandoned due to time and story constraints; the musical number was finally resurrected for and included in the production. Composer Alan Menken, who had both scored and written the film's songs alongside lyricist Howard Ashman, returned to the project to write six new songs for the musical. Lyricist Tim Rice joined Menken to co-write the new numbers, replacing Ashman who had died in 1991, before the film was released. Both Menken and Rice initially approached the project with some resistance; Menken's emotional attachment to the music he had written with Ashman made him fear Disney's vision of a Broadway musical would transform Beauty and the Beast into an attraction too similar to what one would find at Walt Disney World. Meanwhile, Rice, who had previously worked as composer Andrew Lloyd Webber's lyricist on the Broadway musicals Jesus Christ Superstar and Evita, was hesitant to replace Ashman in fear of worsening Beauty and the Beast. Notably, Rice had similarly replaced Ashman to write the remaining songs for Disney's Aladdin (1992) after the lyricist died. Ultimately, the collaboration resulted in approximately half of the Broadway score having co-writing credits by Menken and Ashman, while the remaining half are Menken and Rice compositions. The Menken-Rice songs are sometimes billed as "additional songs composed by [Alan] Menken and lyrics by Tim Rice". On working on the musical without Ashman, Menken explained that "The main challenge ... was blending the lyrics of Tim Rice with those of Howard. In the end, the finished score has a quality all its own; a hybrid between" Ashman and Rice's styles. Elaborating on the main difference between writing songs for the stage as opposed to film, Menken stated that the lack of close-ups and montages in a live musical production creates a requirement for more singing material in order "to provide the same kind of illumination that intimate facial expression provides."

Most of the new material focused on character development, such as Gaston's "Me", Belle's "Home" and the Beast's "If I Can't Love Her". Other new songs, Maurice's fatherly ballad "No Matter What" and Gaston, LeFou, and Monsieur D'Arque's villainous number "Maison des Lunes", were written to flesh out the plot (and in the case of Maison Des Lunes, give Belle and the Beast a longer chance to change into their ballroom outfit). In 1998, a seventh song entitled "A Change in Me" was written four years into production's run specifically for R&B singer Toni Braxton when she joined the cast to play Belle, and appears during the show's second act. The idea for the song originated while Braxton was still in negotiations with Disney to appear in the show for a total of three months, but various circumstances led to the singer constantly delaying signing the contract. It was not until Braxton had dinner with Menken, Rice and West that she finally agreed to sign the contract under the condition that a brand new song be written specifically for her, which an intoxicated Rice had drunkenly offered and promised. When confronted by Roth about his promise upon learning of it from Braxton a few days later, within 24 hours Rice successfully discovered a location within the musical in which to include a new song, specifically "where Belle tells Maurice about how the time that she spent with the Beast in his castle has changed her." That song ultimately became the ballad "A Change in Me", which lyrically addresses the ways in which Belle's initial motivations have ultimately changed during her imprisonment, explaining to Maurice that she has matured and no longer longs for what she originally cited in "Belle (Reprise)". Braxton premiered the song in the form of a live performance on The Rosie O'Donnell Show. Both the song and Braxton's performance were well received, and "A Change in Me" has been included in the musical ever since. Eisner especially enjoyed the song, demanding that it be included in international productions as well, to which he personally traveled in order to teach it to the cast.

David Friedman served as music supervisor, while John Petrafesa Jr. handled sound design. Unlike in the film, Belle actually performs and dances alongside the enchanted objects during "Be Our Guest", which resembles "a high-energy Vegas number" similar to the musical Ziegfeld Follies. The original Broadway cast recording of Beauty and the Beast was released by Walt Disney Records in 1994. Similar cast albums followed suit, including Australian and Japanese recordings in 1994 and 1996, respectively. "A Change in Me" has yet to be included on any official English-language cast recordings though the original Belle, Susan Egan included it on her album So Far.

=== Set and costumes ===
Stanley Meyer designed the original production's set. Following Disney's instructions "to make the animated film come to life", Meyer's set was very much a similar interpretation of the film. Meyer found it "tricky" to translate two-dimensional environments from on screen into a three-dimensional world on stage. The West Wing's appearance has mirrors of its resident the Beast, being hideous on the outside but beautiful when the audience is finally sees the inside of it. In stark contrast to popular musicals The Phantom of the Opera and Into the Woods, Beauty and the Beast's set resembles a hybrid of Gothic Victorian and Louis Quinze.

Disney park company CEO hired costume designer Ann Hould-Ward to design the musical's costumes because the studio enjoyed a "certain aesthetic" she had used in her previous work, and allowed her much creative freedom. Roth was particularly impressed with the designer's contributions to the musicals Sunday in the Park with George and Into the Woods. Hould-Ward accepted Disney's offer because she was interested in seeing exactly how a corporate company producing a Broadway musical for the first time would "change the Broadway world." Conceptualization began in summer 1992. For research purposes, Disney encouraged Hould-Ward to reference the animated film; Linda also researched clothing worn throughout the late 18th century, during which the original fairy tale was written, and spent one year researching household items the way they looked during the mid-1700s. Additionally, Hould-Ward visited with Beauty and the Beast's original animators, spending one week learning how they created their characters to ensure they would be recognizable to those from the film. However, Hould-ward also decided her own creations would not exactly replicate the film's. Basing the costumes on the Rococo art movement, Hould-Ward presented her initial ideas to Eisner & COO Frank Wells. Once approved, Hould-Ward and her team spent the following year creating prototypes of each major costume. With a long work schedule of two years, Hould-Ward recalled "this kind of timeline ... wasn't the norm in a Broadway musical" at the time.

Physically designing Beauty and the Beast's costumes required more collaboration between designer and actor than most other Broadway productions Hould-Ward previously worked on; she frequently sought input from the cast to make sure they were able to move. Designing Belle's costumes was an “easy" task for Hould-Ward; the character was originally dressed in standard Disney heroine attire until replaced with more elaborate costumes, once Belle meets the Beast. Hould-Ward based the character's famous yellow ballgown from several historic portraits. The gown became the first costume built for the production to accommodate Disney's mandate to market the dress in photoshoots and commercials starring Susan and Terrence, six months prior to rehearsals. Weighing 45 pounds, the dress is a combination of various patterns and materials, including a hoop skirt, silk, brocade, beading, flowers and bows. Too large to fit inside Egan's dressing room after the ballroom sequence, undressing required help from three backstage crew members they used wires to hoist the dress into the rafters, it would be stored until the next performance. A lot of time spent designing the Beast's costume, physically creating was especially challenging due to requirements to "allow vocal movement of the performer to show through." Hould-Ward's initial designs for the Beast were constantly rejected by Katzenberg, who reiterated that she "put the movie onstage" until the producer realized that the excessive prosthetics were limiting Mann's vocal performance. A wire frame was utilized to maintain the costume's shape, which evokes heavy metal fashion until substituted for a black Oscar de la Renta-inspired velvet suit when the Beast finally transforms into a prince. Hould-Ward designed the leads' costumes from the perspective of her daughter Leah, explaining, "when Leah comes to see the show, she remembers from the movie that the Beast was in that blue jacket. Leah expects that blue jacket, and if you don't give it to her, she and a lot of other ten-year-olds are going to be sad". At same time, the designer wanted her creations to be equally interesting on an intellectual level for parents to enjoy also.

The challenge of designing Belle and the Beast's costumes paled in comparison to the difficulty of creating the enchanted objects, for which several costumes required intricate wiring, prosthetics and pyrotechnics. Scale was the most prominent "obstacle" for Hould-Ward's to overcome: "The original problem of presenting an actor as a life-sized teapot when the characters in the animation were little in comparison". Because the castle's enchanted staff is slowly transforming into objects, shown at various stages of transformation without completely becoming the objects themselves, Hould-Ward was required to create several different costumes for each character to depict the transformation as the show progresses. Meanwhile. The costume of Lumiere alone, was originally built by a team of forty people, and required a hair and Vac-U-Form specialist; a pyrotechnician, responsible for equipping the costume's pyro unit with butane; and another man to operate the butane tank. While transforming animation into real life, Hould-Ward also worked on adding the physic to each costume, explaining, "I wanted the reality of the real person rather than the fantasy of the object… The essence of my job is to allow our real actors to take you to this fantastical place." A system of wired frames was used to help actors support their characters' heavy outfits. Such elaborate costumes had never been designed for a Broadway production before. Cogsworth's costume features a fully functioning clock on his face. Meanwhile, Madame de la Grande Bouche was the production's most expensive costume.

The musical originally relied on heavy prosthetics and elaborate costuming in an attempt to make the musical resemble the film as closely as possible. In an attempt to replicate the film's famous movie poster, Egan was dressed in flats while Mann was standing on heel hight stilts to establish a more dramatic height difference. According to Egan, the studio "didn't trust the audience's ability to suspend disbelief, something theater-goers are routinely asked to do." However, the company finally began to relent as the production neared Houston tryouts after a final run-through which the actors did not wear costumes; thus, the prosthetics were gradually lessened and replaced by make up for the Beast and enchanted objects during 1993 previews. The elaborate costumes resulted in their fair share of technical difficulties, malfunctions and performance restrictions, many of which manifested during the seven-week tryouts in Houston. The costumes left little room for performers to change between scenes, and air conditioners were fastened to them regulating the air temperature In general, the weight of the enchanted objects' costumes limited dancing. Chiropractors and therapists remained on standby to assist Beth Fowler, her Mrs. Potts costume required to always keep one arm in the air. Beach compared holding up two propane tanks used to represent Lumiere's candles to carrying two hams around a grocery store two and a half hours. To build his stamina, Beach would carry the tanks during rehearsal. Beach's hand caught fire during one performance, which not noticing until Mann subtly pointed it out using "furtive head nods". While dancing, the movement of Egan's heavy ballgown caused its skirt to constantly pull her in opposite direction of which way she turned. Mann likened performing in the Beast's costume to wearing several heavy winter coats, comparing the wig to "four Angora cats and gaffer taping them to your head and then running around the block 10 or 12 times." Disney was outraged, after their first performance at the Palace Theatre, The New York Times published describing Al Hirschfeld's line drawing interpretation of Belle and the Beast's pose, in which Belle's yellow gown was colored pink, and the Beast's tuxedo appeared greenish as opposed to royal blue. When Disney confronted Hirschfeld, the artist defended his work, explaining, "The costumes may have been blue and yellow, they make me feel green and pink." Hould-Ward adjusted the costumes to accommodate the locations as the production traveled to various theaters.

=== Lighting and special effects ===
Lighting designer Natasha Katz was hired to work on Beauty and the Beast. When Disney first approached Katz to offer her the job, several of Katz's cohorts – specifically other lighting designers – attempted to discourage her from accepting in fear of changing the appearance of musical theater forever. In hindsight, Katz defended Disney's work, explaining, "Beauty and the Beast didn't bring theatre back to New York, but it did change the dynamic, no question about it, of the business." Known for assisting David Copperfield with his illusions, Roth hired Jim Steinmeyer to work on Beauty and the Beast. Steinmeyer had previously contributed to the musical Merlin. The Beast's transformation sequence during the second act was much-discussed. It took about 11 weeks to set the design.

== Synopsis ==
=== Act I ===
On a cold winter's night, an old beggar woman comes to a young spoiled prince's castle, offering him a single rose in return for shelter, but the prince turns her away solely for her appearance. The woman warns him not to be deceived by appearances, for beauty is found within, only to be rejected again. She then transforms into a beautiful enchantress and turns the prince into a hideous Beast and his servants into various household objects, while giving him the rose to use as an hourglass. The only way he can break the spell is to learn to love another and earn her love in return before the last petal falls ("Prologue").

Ten years later, a beautiful young girl named Belle makes her way into town one morning to get a book from the local bookseller. On the way, she expresses her wish to live in a world like her books, full of adventure, while the townspeople note her unparalleled beauty but find her love of books odd ("Belle"). Belle has also attracted the attention of Gaston, the local hunter and town hero, who admires her only for her beauty. Belle, however, is not oblivious to her peers' views of her, and voices her concerns about it to her eccentric father and inventor, Maurice, who assures her that she is anything but strange ("No Matter What"). The two then put the finishing touches on his invention, and Maurice heads off to an invention fair donning a scarf knitted for him by Belle ("No Matter What (Reprise)"), but becomes lost in the woods and is attacked by a pack of wolves. After surviving the wolf attack, he enters the Beast's castle, where he meets the servants, including Lumière, a maître d' turned into a candelabra, Cogsworth, the head of household turned into a clock, Babette, a maid turned into a feather duster, Mrs. Potts, the head of the kitchen turned into a teapot, and Chip, her son turned into a teacup. They welcome him, but the horrid Beast arrives and locks Maurice away in the dungeon for trespassing.

Back in town, Gaston proposes to Belle, which she politely rejects ("Me"). Appalled by Gaston's forwardness, Belle once again voices her need for a life outside this provincial life ("Belle (Reprise)"). Gaston's sidekick, LeFou, returns from the woods wearing the scarf Belle knitted for Maurice. Belle realizes her father is in danger and heads into the woods to look for him. She ends up at the castle, where she finds her father locked away in a dungeon. She makes a deal with the Beast, Maurice goes free, but she remains instead. They agree, and Maurice is sent back to town without being allowed to say goodbye. Belle is given a guest room and ordered by the Beast to join him for dinner. She mourns her situation ("Home"), but Mrs. Potts and Madame de la Grande Bouche, an operatic wardrobe, attempt to cheer her up ("Home (Reprise)").

Back in town, at the local tavern, Gaston sulks at his loss of a bride, though LeFou and the patrons successfully attempt to cheer him up ("Gaston"). When Maurice rushes in, claiming a Beast has Belle locked away, they laugh at him, but Gaston is inspired by Maurice's claims to formulate a sinister plan ("Gaston (Reprise)"). Back at the castle, the Beast grows impatient as Belle has yet to join him for dinner, and when Cogsworth informs him she refuses to come, a shouting match between Belle and the Beast ensues (which ends in a victory for Belle), and the Beast then tells her if she cannot eat with him, then she will not eat at all. He storms back to his quarters and begins to sulk, noting his fate should the spell not break ("How Long Must This Go On?"). Eventually, Belle does become hungry and ventures into the kitchen where the servants offer her dinner despite their master's orders, and they treat her to an amazing cabaret show ("Be Our Guest").

After dinner, Belle gets a tour of the castle courtesy of Cogsworth and Lumière. Her curiosity leads her to enter the West Wing, a place the Beast told her was forbidden. Mesmerized by a mysterious rose floating in a bell jar, she reaches out to touch it, but before she can, the Beast stops her and orders her to get out, accidentally shoving her in the process. Fearing for her life, Belle flees from the castle. Realizing his mistake, the Beast knows he will be a monster forever if he cannot learn to love her ("If I Can't Love Her").

=== Act II ===
In the woods, Belle is attacked by wolves and is only rescued when the Beast comes to her aid, but he is injured during the fight and collapses ("Entr'acte/Wolf Chase"). Instead of taking the chance to run home, Belle helps him back to the castle. She cleans his injuries, and after a brief argument about whose fault this is, the Beast thanks her for her kindness, and thus, their friendship is born. Wanting to give her a thank-you gift, the Beast gives Belle his huge library, which excites her. She notes a change in the Beast's personality as the servants note a change in Belle and the Beast's relationship ("Something There"). They express their hope of being human once more ("Human Again"), while Belle asks the Beast to accompany her to dinner that night.

Back in the village tavern, Gaston and Lefou meet with the owner of the local insane asylum, Monsieur D’Arque. They conspire to blackmail Belle into marrying Gaston by having Maurice incarcerated, unless she agrees. (“Maison Des Lunes”).

The Beast and Belle attend a lovely dinner and personal ball, where they dance together ("Beauty and the Beast"). The Beast, who plans to tell Belle he loves her, asks Belle if she is happy here, to which she responds positively but notes that she misses her father. He offers her his Magic Mirror to view him, and she sees that Maurice is sick and lost in the woods and fears for his life. Even though the Beast knows there are only a few hours left till the last petal falls from the rose, he allows Belle to leave to save her father; she departs after a bittersweet goodbye ("If I Can't Love Her (Reprise)").

Belle finds her father and brings him back to their house in the village. After she nurses him back to health, she explains the transformation she seems to have gone through while she was with the Beast ("A Change in Me"). A mob arrives, led by Gaston, to take Maurice away, but Belle proves her father's sanity by showing the townspeople the Beast is real using the Magic Mirror, but does not realize the error in her gesture. The townspeople immediately fear the Beast, but Belle insists that he is gentle and kind. Gaston catches her tone and recognizes the Beast as his rival for Belle's affections and organizes the mob to "kill the Beast" ("Mob Song"). To warn the Beast, Belle and Maurice attempt to beat the mob to the castle, but they arrive too late as Gaston and the mob reach the castle.

The servants keep the lynch mob at bay ("The Battle"), but Gaston breaks through and finds the Beast in his tower. He engages in a fight with him, mercilessly beating and taunting him, but the Beast has lost the will to live at Belle's departure. As Gaston moves in for the killing blow, Belle arrives. The Beast immediately turns on Gaston and is prepared to kill him, but spares his life after seeing the fear in his eyes. The Beast and Belle are reunited, but this reunion is cut short as Gaston fatally stabs the Beast in the back. This act of violence causes Gaston to lose his footing, and he falls to his death.

Belle assures the Beast he'll live, but they both know she is helpless to save him. She begs him not to leave her because she has found a home in his company ("Home (Reprise)"), but despite this, he dies; Belle sobs and whispers "I love you" just before the last rose petal falls. A transformation occurs, and the Beast is alive and human once more. Though Belle does not recognize him at first, she looks into his eyes and sees the Beast within, and they share a kiss. The two of them sing of how their lives have changed because of love and they dance once more as the servants, now changed back to their human form, gathers in the ballroom ("Transformation/Finale").

== Productions ==
=== Houston (1993) ===
Beauty and the Beast premiered in a joint production of Theatre Under The Stars and Disney Theatrical at the Music Hall, Houston, Texas, from November 28, 1993, through December 26, 1993. Previews began November 27, 1993.

=== Original Broadway production (1994–2007) ===
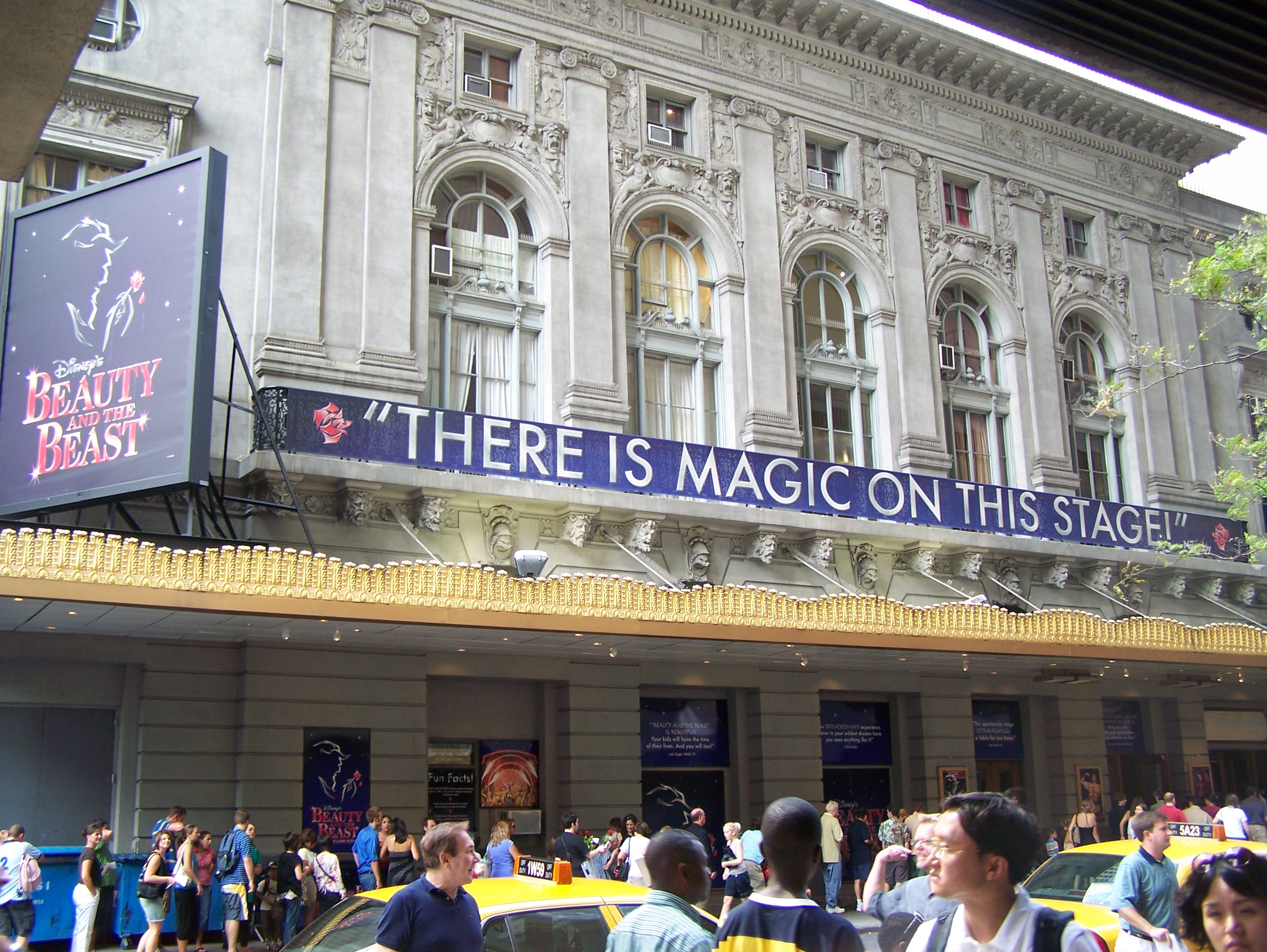
The Beast Logo outside the Lunt-Fontanne Theatre in 2006, in the final years of Beauty and the Beast, before closing in 2007.

The show began previews on Broadway at the Palace Theatre on March 9, 1994, with the official opening on April 18, 1994, and ran there until September 5, 1999. The show then transferred to the Lunt-Fontanne Theatre on November 11, 1999, with an official opening date of November 16, 1999. The musical closed on July 29, 2007, after 46 previews and 5,461 performances, and is Broadway's eleventh-longest running production in history (as of December 2025). The production holds the record of being the longest running production at both the Palace Theatre, where it opened, and the Lunt-Fontanne Theatre, where it closed its Broadway run. The production cost an estimated $12 million, arguably higher, becoming the most costly Broadway musical at the time. However, some analysts estimate the cost to be closer to $20 million.

Directed by Robert Jess Roth with choreography by Matt West and assisted by Dan Mojica, the original Broadway cast included Susan Egan as Belle, Terrence Mann as the Beast, Burke Moses as Gaston, Gary Beach as Lumière and Beth Fowler as Mrs. Potts. Orchestrations were by Danny Troob (after his own orchestrations and arrangements of the film), scenic designer was Stan Meyer, costume designer Ann Hould-Ward, lighting designer Natasha Katz, sound was by T. Richard Fitzgerald, hair designer David H. Lawrence, and prosthetics were by John Dods. Illusions were by Jim Steinmeyer and John Gaughan, and pyrotechnic design was by Tyler Wymer.

The Broadway production closed to make way for Disney's next musical venture, The Little Mermaid. With Disney set to open its Broadway version of The Little Mermaid on November 3, 2007, at the time, it was believed that having two Disney Princess films on Broadway at the same time would divide audiences and cause competition between the two shows. At this point, Disney also had three other shows running at the same time: The Lion King, Tarzan, and Mary Poppins. It was reported that Disney Theatrical planned to revive the show on Broadway for the 2008 holiday season, but Disney did not pursue this.

In 2026, Alan Menken teased at D23 Expo that a Broadway revival is in the works.

=== TV ice-show special (1996) ===
On December 8, 1996, Disney's Beauty and the Beast: A Concert on Ice, an ice show adaptation, was broadcast on CBS. The special was produced by Micawber Productions and Rodan Productions and featured songs from the musical. It starred Ekaterina Gordeeva as Belle and Victor Petrenko as The Beast with Scott Hamilton as Lumiere while Steve Binder directed and was hosted by James Barbour and Susan Egan.

=== West End production (1997–1999) ===
The West End production opened at London's Dominion Theatre on April 29, 1997, starring Julie-Alanah Brighten as Belle and Alasdair Harvey as the Beast. It also featured Burke Moses reprising his role as Gaston, Derek Griffiths as Lumiere, Mary Millar as Mrs. Potts, Norman Rossington as Maurice, Barry James as Cogsworth, Di Botcher as Madame de la Grande Bouche, Richard Gauntlett as LeFou, and Rebecca Thornhill as Babette.

Over the course of the production, notable replacements included Michelle Gayle and Annalene Beechey as Belle, John Barrowman and Earl Carpenter as the Beast, Alex Bourne as Gaston, and Billy Boyle and Terry Doyle as Maurice. The production ended on December 11, 1999.

The production won the American Express Award for Best New Musical at the 1998 Laurence Olivier Awards, against other nominees Enter the Guardsman, The Fix and Lady in the Dark.

=== West End revival (2022) ===
The UK and Ireland reimagined tour which opened in August 2021, played a limited London Palladium engagement from June 24 through September 17, 2022. It starred Shaq Taylor as The Beast, Courtney Stapleton as Belle, and the rest of the tour's cast.

=== US national tours ===
The show had five US national tours. The first national tour launched on November 15, 1995 at the Orpheum Theatre in Minneapolis, and closed in 1999. It featured Kim Huber as Belle, Fred Inkley as the Beast, Patrick Page as Lumiere, and Paige Davis as Babette. Patrick Page and Paige Davis met and fell in love during the tour and married.

A second national tour opened in 1999 with Susan Owen as Belle and Grant Norman as The Beast. This production closed in 2003. The third national tour opened in 2001 and closed in 2003. This production starred Jennifer Shraeder as Belle and Roger Befeler as the Beast with Marc G. Dalio as Gaston. Notable replacements on the tours have included Sarah Litzsinger, Erin Dilly and Danyelle Bossardet as Belle. The three touring companies visited 137 venues in 90 North American cities. About 5.5 million people in the United States and Canada saw these tours.

The fourth national tour of Beauty and the Beast began February 2010, opening in Providence, Rhode Island, starring Liz Shivener as Belle and Justin Glaser as the Beast. Under the direction of the original Broadway creative team, the show featured all new sets and costumes. The tour was the longest in the show's history, running until July 2016.

A new North American tour based on the UK and Australian productions opened in June 2025 at the Cadillac Palace Theater in Chicago, with Kyra Belle Johnson as Belle, Stephen Mark Lukas as Gaston, and Fergie L. Philippe as the Beast. Levi Blaise Coleman (through November 15, 2026) and Beatrice Goddard Beggs shared the role of Chip for the on set of the newly imagined North American Tour. Kanoa Edgar joined the tour replacing Beatrice Goddard Beggs in November of 2025 with “Bea” who became the Chip Vacation Swing.

=== UK national tours ===
The UK national tour (prior to the closure of the West End Production in 1999) began on November 2, 2001, at the Empire Theatre in Liverpool with stops in Bristol, Birmingham, Dublin, Southampton, Manchester and ended on April 12, 2003, at the Playhouse Theatre in Edinburgh. The tour starred Annalene Beechey (reprising her role from the London production) as Belle, Alistair Robins as the Beast, Ben Harlow as Gaston, Julia Goss as Mrs. Potts, Stephen Matthews as Lumiere, Barry James (reprising his role from the London production) as Cogsworth, Billy Boyle (reprising his role from the London production) as Maurice, Karen Davies as Madame de la Grande Bouche, Kate Graham (reprising her role from the London production) as Babette, Anthony Clegg as LeFou, and Oliver Taylor (reprising his role from the London production) and Sion Eifion sharing the role of Chip. Notable replacements included Dianne Pilkington as Belle, Alex Bourne as the Beast, Earl Carpenter as Gaston, Marilyn Cutts as Mrs. Potts, Richard Tate as Maurice, and Drew Varley as LeFou.

The musical's branding and promotional graphics were updated in 2020 for the UK national tour. The designs have since been adopted for the 2023 Australian tour, and the 2025 US Tour, though a future Broadway revival might use it.

In September 2020, it was announced that the production embarked on a new UK and Ireland tour, which was scheduled to open at the Bristol Hippodrome on August 25, 2021, with stops in Liverpool, Edinburgh, Cardiff, Sunderland, Birmingham, Manchester and Dublin with further dates to be confirmed. The production starred Courtney Stapleton and Emmanuel Kojo as Belle and the Beast respectively, while other cast members include Tom Senior, Martin Ball, Gavin Lee, and Sam Bailey. The branding and promotional graphics, including posters, venue banners, and advertising, were updated for this and subsequent tours. The new design features silhouettes of Belle and the Beast embracing over a rose, their shapes dissolving into a swirling tower of rose petals on a purple background. The imagery is accompanied by metallic logo and type, based on the Rococo style typeface, Span, by Jamie Clarke.

In October 2021, Kojo was suspended (and later fired) from playing the role of The Beast due to allegations of inappropriate language to women working in the show. After an investigation was launched, Beast understudy Alyn Hawke was promoted to temporary principal until Shaq Taylor stepped in as full-time replacement in early 2022.

=== International productions ===
Beauty and the Beast has been performed in more than 40 countries, including Argentina, Australia, Austria, Belgium, Brazil, Canada, China, Egypt, Estonia, Finland, France, Germany, Greece, Hungary, India, Indonesia, Ireland, Israel, Italy, Japan, Lebanon, Mexico, Netherlands, Norway, Philippines, Poland, Qatar, Romania, Russia, Singapore, South Africa, South Korea, Spain, Sweden, Switzerland, Taiwan, Thailand, Turkey, United Arab Emirates, United Kingdom, and United States. Over 35 million people have seen the show worldwide and it has grossed more than $1.7 billion.

On July 15, 1995, the musical began its original Australian run in Melbourne at the Princess Theatre, before moving on to Sydney. The original Australian cast included Michael Cormick as The Beast, Rachael Beck as Belle, Hugh Jackman as Gaston, and Ernie Bourne as Maurice.

In 1995, the musical opened in Japan and was performed by the Shiki Theatre Company. The musical continued to tour Japan until May 2017. An updated, permanent production opened at the Maihama Amphitheater at Tokyo Disney Resort, produced by Shiki Theatre Company in association with Disney Theatrical Productions, in October 2022.

The Toronto production opened at the Princess of Wales Theatre on July 25, 1995, and closed on August 30, 1997. The production starred Kerry Butler as Belle and Chuck Wagner as the Beast, with Terry Doyle as Maurice. Notable replacements included Melissa Thomson as Belle and Steve Blanchard as the Beast. The lesser known Halifax production at the Neptune Theatre was the longest running production in the theater's history.

A Los Angeles production opened at the Shubert Theatre on April 12, 1995, and closed on September 29, 1996. Most of the original Broadway cast returned, including Susan Egan, Terrence Mann, Gary Beach, Beth Fowler, Burke Moses and Tom Bosley. Notable replacements included James Stacy Barbour as the Beast. The sets in this production were widely considered to be the largest out of all the musical's productions in the world. After the show closed in Los Angeles, all of the sets were transferred for the production in Mexico City in 1997.

A production opened in Vienna, Austria in 1995. The principal cast included Ethan Freeman as the Beast, Caroline Vasicek as Belle, Kevin Tarte as Gaston, and Viktor Gernot as Lumiere. Steve Barton joined the cast in 1996 as the Beast.

In December 1997, the musical opened in Stuttgart at the Palladium Theatre, Stuttgart and played there until December 22, 2000. Leah Delos Santos played Belle and Uwe Kröger played the Beast and Marc G. Dalio played Gaston.

2026 the show was revived in Vienna.

In 1999, the musical opened in China.

On March 4, 2005, Beauty and the Beast had its Scandinavian premiere at The Göteborg Opera with Fred Johanson as the Beast and Annica Edstam as Belle.

On June 16, 2005, the musical began its Philippine run at the Meralco Theater. Produced by Atlantis Productions, it featured KC Concepcion alternating with Karel Marquez as Belle, Jett Pangan as the Beast, and Calvin Millado as Gaston. In September 2005, a production in Budapest, Hungary premiered at the Budapesti Operettszínház.

In South America, Argentina was the first country to produce it, with Marisol Otero as Belle, Juan Rodó as Beast, Diego Jaraz as Gaston, Gustavo Monje as LeFou, Pablo Lizaso as Lumière, Mónica Nuñez as Mrs. Potts, Omar Pini as Cogsworth, Alejandra Radano as Babette and Rodolfo Valss as Maurice. It ran from November 26, 1998, at the Teatro Ópera in Buenos Aires until August 15, 1999, before opening again in 2010. Brazil was the second country to host the musical. Disney had plans to bring it to the country in 1999, after the success in Argentina, but nobody really knew if it would work. Three years later, in 2002, Beauty and the Beast finally opened in Brazil at Teatro Abril, one of the biggest theaters in the country. It was a huge hit, for more than one and a half years, it was presented with Kiara Sasso playing Belle and Saulo Vasconcelos playing the Beast. In 2009, a new Belle and a new Beast were cast, Lissah Martins and Ricardo Vieira, as the musical came back to Brazil, Kiara Sasso was playing Maria in The Sound of Music. Beauty and the Beast remained for six months at Teatro Abril. Even though the play was brought back as a way to try to recoup some of the money lost in Brazil's version of Miss Saigon, this second incarnation of Beauty and the Beast failed to create any critical buzz, or to be a box office success.

In Spain, there have been three productions of the show. The first one, based on the original Broadway production, had its Madrid debut on December 2, 1999, at Teatro Lope de Vega. The original cast included Xenia Reguant (later replaced by Julia Möller) as Belle, Carlos Marín (later replaced by Joe Luciano) as Beast, Lisardo Guarinos (later replaced by Manuel Bandera) as Gaston, Víctor Ullate Roche as LeFou, Germán Torres as Lumière, Kirby Navarro as Mrs. Potts, David Venancio Muro as Cogsworth, Dulcinea Juárez as Babette, Laura Inclán as Madame de la Grande Bouche and Miguel de Grandy as Maurice. After a successful run of 27 months and about 900 performances, the production finally closed on March 3, 2002, becoming the longest-running musical ever in Madrid at that time. In 2007, a second version produced by Stage Entertainment premiered on October 3, at Teatro Coliseum, Madrid, for a limited run of six months, but the closing was postponed due to a successful season. The original cast included Julia Möller reprising her role as Belle (later replaced by María Adamuz), David Ordinas as Beast, Pablo Puyol as Gaston, Raúl Peña as LeFou, Armando Pita as Lumière, Angels Jiménez as Mrs. Potts (later replaced by Rita Barber), Esteban Oliver as Cogsworth, Silvia Luchetti as Babette, María José Oquendo as Madame de la Grande Bouche and Lorenzo Valverde as Maurice. The production closed on January 11, 2009, and was transferred to Barcelona, where it ran from February 26, 2009, to January 10, 2010, at the BTM, with some changes in the cast, including Mercè Martínez as Mrs. Potts, Marta Capel as Babette, Patricia Paisal as Madame de la Grande Bouche and Albert Muntanyola as Maurice. In 2012, the Stage Entertainment version was relaunched as a touring production, beginning performances on September 6, at Teatro Calderón, Valladolid. The original cast of this third Spanish production included Talía del Val as Belle, Ignasi Vidal as Beast, Daniel Diges as Gaston, Raúl Peña as LeFou, Diego Rodríguez as Lumière, Mone as Mrs. Potts, Frank Capdet as Cogsworth, Marta Capel as Babette, Eva Diago as Madame de la Grande Bouche and Enrique R. del Portal as Maurice.

In 2005, Disney and Stage Entertainment produced a new version of the show, directed by Glenn Casale, using brand new sets and costumes. After touring the Netherlands and playing in Antwerp, Belgium, Disney and Stage Entertainment brought the show to Berlin, Germany, in 2006 after a (approx.) one-year run at the Metronom Theater in Oberhausen. This production opened in 2007 in Madrid, Spain and in 2009 in Barcelona, Spain; and Milan and Rome, Italy, with Arianna as Belle and Michel Altieri as the Beast. A Russian production of the show opened in 2009 in Moscow, Russia; with television actress Yekaterina Guseva and Stage Entertainment actress Natalya Bystrova alternating the role of Belle.

The Broadway production played a second time in Mexico City beginning in September 2007 and in Hiroshima, Japan, beginning in February 2008. The Broadway production opened in South Africa in September 2008 and ran until March 2009. In 2004, Disney began to license the show to other companies for touring, and the show has been performed by professional and amateur companies in many countries.

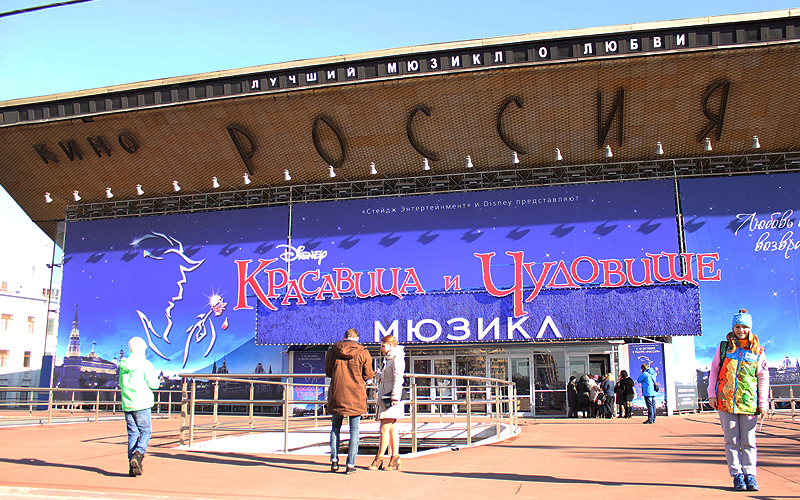
Russian revival at the Rossiya Theatre in Moscow, 2014.

On October 24, 2013, the Glenn Casale production of Beauty and the Beast opened at Théâtre Mogador in Paris, France. A Russian revival was staged at the Russia theatre, in Moscow starring Anastasia Yatsenko and Yulia Iva alternating as Belle. One of the Belles in the original Russian cast, Natalya Bystrova, revisited the role for selected performances. The production came back to the Netherlands at the Circustheater in The Hague, starring Anouk Maas as Belle, Edwin Jonker as Beast and Freek Bartels as Gaston.

Beginning October 2014, Disney Theatrical Productions, NETworks, and Broadway Entertainment Group launched an international tour in celebration of Beauty and the Beast's 20th anniversary on stage. The tour opened at the Zorlu Center in Istanbul, Turkey, and closed in January 2016 at Dubai World Trade Centre, having visited Turkey, United Arab Emirates, Greece, Italy, Philippines, Thailand, Singapore, Indonesia, China, Taiwan, Egypt, Lebanon, Romania, and Qatar.

In 2016, Disney and Marmelade produced an updated version for the Flemish Region of Belgium. The original cast included Josje Huisman as Belle, Jan Schepens as Beast, Dieter Troubleyn as Gaston, Peter Van de Velde as Lumière, Frank Hoelen as Maurice, Ivan Pecnik as Cogsworth (called Tickens), Eline De Munck as Babette, Peter Thyssen as LeFou, Barbara Dex as Mrs. Potts and Saskia Schäfer as Madame de la Grande Bouche (called La Commodia). The show premiered on December 10, 2016, at Flanders Expo in Ghent.

In 2018, an Estonian non-replica production was produced by Disney Theatrical Productions at the Vanemuine Teater with Saara Pius & Kärt Anton sharing the role of Belle, Kalle Sepp & René Soom in the role of The Beast, Mihkel Tikerpalu & Oliver Timmusk in the role of Gaston, Norman Salumäe & Samuel Pilpak in the role of LeFou and Juss Haasma & Silver Laas in the role of Lumière.

A new Australian production based on the 2021 UK tour opened at Sydney's Capitol Theatre in June 2023, and went to Melbourne and Brisbane in 2024. It starred Shubshri Kandiah as Belle and Brendan Xavier as Beast.

=== Amateur rights ===
The show's rights became available (in association with Josef Weinberger Ltd.) to amateur performing groups and regional musical societies. The show has been performed in numerous countries, by theatre companies on both an amateur and professional level.

In 2008, Music Theatre International released licensing rights for Disney's Beauty and the Beast JR., a 60-minute adaptation of the musical intended for younger performers.

The libretto was revised by the original creative team for the 2021 UK tour. Most of the changes (except for the new reduced orchestration, which isn't available for licensing), were added to the official licensed script in June 2021. Some of the changes include the removal of "Maison des Lunes" and "The Battle", optional cuts to dance breaks and making "No Matter What" an optional song. The "Silly Girls" were renamed "Les Filles de la Ville".

== Original casts ==
Characters	Broadway	Los Angeles	Australia	Toronto	Vienna	1st US tour	West End	2nd US tour	1st UK tour	2nd UK tour	West End revival	Australia revival	5th US tour
Characters	1994	1995					1997	1999	2001	2021	2022	2023	2025
Belle	Susan Egan	Susan Egan	Rachael Beck	Kerry Butler	Caroline Vasicek	Kim Huber	Julie-Alanah Brighten	Susan Owen	Annalene Beechey	Courtney Stapleton	Courtney Stapleton	Shubshri Kandiah	Kyra Belle Johnson
The Beast	Terrence Mann	Terrence Mann	Michael Cormick	Chuck Wagner	Ethan Freeman	Fred Inkley	Alasdair Harvey	Grant Norman	Alistair Robins	Emmanuel Kojo	Shaq Taylor	Brendan Xavier	Fergie L. Philippe
Gaston	Burke Moses	Burke Moses	Hugh Jackman	Dan Chameroy	Kevin Tarte	Tony Lawson	Burke Moses	Chris Hoch	Ben Harlow	Tom Senior	Tom Senior	Jackson Head	Stephen Mark Lukas
Lumière	Gary Beach	Gary Beach	Grant Smith	André Thérien	Viktor Gernot	Patrick Page	Derek Griffiths	Ron Wisniski	Stephen Matthews	Gavin Lee	Gavin Lee	Rohan Browne	Danny Gardner
Mrs. Potts	Beth Fowler	Beth Fowler	Robyn Arthur	Judy Marshak	Rosita Mewis	Betsy Joslyn	Mary Millar	Janet MacEwen	Julia Goss	Sam Bailey	Sam Bailey	Jayde Westaby	Kathy Voytko
Cogsworth	Heath Lamberts	Fred Applegate	Bert Newton	Paul Brown	Heinz Zuber	Jeff Brooks	Barry James	John Alban Coughlan	Barry James	Nigel Richards	Nigel Richards	Gareth Jacobs	Javier Ignacio
LeFou	Kenny Raskin	Jamie Torcellini	Zachary McKay	Cliff Saunders	Eric Minsk	Dan Sklar	Richard Gauntlett	Michael Raine	Anthony Clegg	Louis Stockil	Louis Stockil	Nick Cox	Harry Francis
Maurice	Tom Bosley	Tom Bosley	Ernie Bourne	Terry Doyle	Rudolf Wasserlof	Grant Cowan	Norman Rossington	Ron Lee Savin	Billy Boyle	Martin Ball	Martin Ball	Rodney Dobson	Kevin Ligon
Babette	Stacey Logan	Heather Lee	Alinta Carroll	Elizabeth Beeler	Ann Mandrella	Leslie Castay	Rebecca Thornhill	Jennifer Shrader	Kate Graham	Emma Caffrey	Emma Caffrey	Hayley Martin	Cameron Monroe Thomas
Madame de la Grande Bouche	Eleanor Glockner	Mary Jo Catlett	Gloden Mercer	Jo-Anne Kirwan Clark	Marika Lichter	Mary Stout	Di Botcher	Monica M. Wemitt	Karen Davies	Samantha Bingley	Samantha Bingley	Alana Tranter	Holly Ann Butler
Chip	Brian Press	Adam Wylie Jeremy Lelliott	Paul Cheyene Anthony Hammer Zach Meyers	Gil Filar Noah Reid		Alex Bowen Braden Dickie	Ben Butterfield Dayle Hodge Simon Kennedy	Michael Mags Miles Meehan	Oliver Taylor Sion Eifion	Manasseh Mapira Iesa Miller Theo Querico Rojae Simpson Joshua Smith	Benjamin Dalton Sekhani Dumezweni Zarian Marcel Obatarhe Rojae Simpson	Romeo Angelkovski Akiva Guigen Christopher Joseph Orlando Steiner	Beatrice Goddard Beggs Levi Blaise Coleman

=== Notable cast replacements ===
Notable Broadway cast replacements (approximate dates given where available)

- Belle: Sarah Uriarte Berry (1995–1996 & 2006), Kerry Butler (1996–1997), Debbie Gibson (1997–1998), Toni Braxton (1998–1999; first African American to play Belle on Broadway), Andrea McArdle (1999–2000), Sarah Litzsinger (2000–2002, 2003 & 2006), Jamie-Lynn Sigler (2002–2003, Broadway debut), Megan McGinnis (2003–2004), Christy Carlson Romano (2004), Ashley Brown (2005–2006, Broadway debut), Anneliese van der Pol (2007, Broadway debut, closing cast). A total of 17 actresses have played the part of Belle in the Broadway production, with Litzsinger playing it the longest.
- Beast: Jeff McCarthy (1995–1997 & 2004), Chuck Wagner (1997–1998), James Barbour (1998–1999), Steve Blanchard (who played the Beast for the last eight years of the Broadway run).
- Gaston: Marc Kudisch (1995–1997), Steve Blanchard (1997–1999), Christopher Sieber (2001), Donny Osmond (2006 & final Broadway performance)
- Lumière: Lee Roy Reams (1995), Meshach Taylor (1998–1999, Broadway debut), Patrick Page (1999–2001 & 2003), Paul Schoeffler (2001), Bryan Batt (2001–2002), Jacob Young (2006, Broadway debut), John Tartaglia (2006–2007)
- Cogsworth: Peter Bartlett, Jonathan Freeman (2006–2007)
- Chip: Harrison Chad, Sean Curley, Nick Jonas

Notable Canada cast replacements

- Beast: Steve Blanchard

Notable Vienna cast replacements

- Beast: Steve Barton

Notable West End cast replacements

- Belle: Michelle Gayle
- Beast: John Barrowman, Earl Carpenter
- Mrs. Potts: Gemma Craven
- Maurice: Billy Boyle

Notable 1st UK Tour cast replacements

- Belle: Dianne Pilkington
- Gaston: Earl Carpenter

== Characters ==
Character	Description
Belle	A vibrant, intelligent young beauty who wants much more in life than living in a small town. She is perceived to be quite odd. Voice type: Mezzo-Soprano
The Beast	A prince transformed into a terrifying beast for his lack of compassion; short-tempered and commanding, but with a warm, loving heart buried far beneath his gruff exterior. Voice type: Baritone
Gaston	The story's antagonist. The vain, egotistical, narcissistic, ultra-masculine villain determined to marry Belle. Voice type: Baritone
Lumière	A suave, French, debonair enchanted candelabra. The maître d' of the castle. Voice type: Baritone
Mrs. Potts	A kind-hearted, maternal enchanted teapot. The head of the castle's kitchen. Voice type: Mezzo-Soprano
Cogsworth	A tightly wound, enchanted stuffy mantle clock and head of the Beast's castle. Voice type: Baritone
LeFou	Gaston's bumbling sidekick. Voice type: Tenor
Maurice	Belle's loving, eccentric inventor father. Voice type: Baritone
Babette	A saucy, flirtatious featherduster who seeks Lumière's affections. The maid of the castle. Voice type: Soprano
Madame de la Grande Bouche	A former opera diva turned into a wardrobe. Voice type: Soprano
Chip	A young teacup; Mrs. Potts' son. Voice type: Boy soprano
Monsieur D'Arque	The freaky, scheming proprietor of the local insane asylum, the Maison des Lunes. Voice type: Tenor
Ensemble	Silly Girls, Enchanted Objects, Townspeople, Tavern Patrons, Mob.

== Musical numbers ==
Act I

- Overture*#¶ — Orchestra
- Prologue — Narrator
- Belle — Belle, Gaston, Silly Girls, Ensemble
- No Matter What*#¶ — Maurice, Belle
- No Matter What (Reprise) / Wolf Chase*# — Maurice
- Me*# — Gaston, Belle
- Belle (Reprise) — Belle
- Home* — Belle
- Home (Reprise) — Mrs. Potts
- Gaston† — LeFou, Gaston, Silly Girls, Ensemble
- Gaston (Reprise)† — Gaston, LeFou
- How Long Must This Go On?*# — Beast
- Be Our Guest† — Lumiere, Mrs. Potts, Ensemble
- If I Can't Love Her*# — Beast

Act II

- Entr'acte/Wolf Chase* — Orchestra
- Something There — Belle, Beast, Lumiere, Mrs. Potts, Cogsworth
- Human Again*‡ — Lumiere, Mrs. Potts, Chip, Madame de la Grande Bouche, Babette, Cogsworth, Ensemble
- Maison Des Lunes*#¶ — Gaston, LeFou, Monsieur D' Arque
- Beauty and the Beast — Mrs. Potts
- If I Can't Love Her (Reprise)* — Beast
- A Change in Me*§# — Belle
- The Mob Song — Gaston, Ensemble
- The Battle*¶ — The Company
- Home (Reprise II)* — Belle
- Transformation* — Beast, Belle, Ensemble
- Beauty and the Beast (Reprise) — The Company

* New song/Expanded score

† Expanded vocal or instrumental content, using either cut lyrics by Ashman or dance arrangements by Glen Kelly, or both.

‡ "Human Again" was written by Menken and Ashman for the movie, but was cut, due to the complications it made on the film's timeline. It was repurposed for the Broadway play, and on account of the musical's great success, an entirely new animated sequence based on the Broadway version was set to this song and inserted into 2002's Special Edition DVD release.

§ "A Change in Me" was written into the show in 1998 for the debut of Toni Braxton and was retained thereafter.

¶ Cut from the show for the 2021–23 UK Tour/MTI revision (Maison Des Lunes) and optional (No Matter What).

# not in the Junior Broadway show, but some Junior versions have retained the song.

== Instrumentation ==
Music Theatre International offers two orchestrations for Beauty and the Beast.

The "Standard Orchestration", of the licensed version of the show is the bigger orchestration, based on the original Broadway arrangements and the revisions for the Stage Entertainment production. It is scored for three synthesizers (the first playing piano and celeste, the second augmenting different sections and the third augmenting the string section), a drum kit (including glockenspiel), a percussion section, double bass, three woodwind players, three French horns in F, two trumpets in B-flat, trombone, divided violins (with a minimum of two players), cello, and a harp. The first woodwind player doubles on flute and piccolo, the second on English horn and oboe, and the third on clarinet, bass clarinet, and flute. The trombonist doubles on bass trombone and tuba and both trumpeters double on piccolo trumpet.

The original Broadway orchestration, orchestrated by Danny Troob, featured a string section of 6 violins and 2 celli, and two additional woodwind players. The first played flute and piccolo, the second oboe and English horn, the third piccolo, flute and clarinet in B-flat, the fourth piccolo, flute, clarinet in B-flat and bass clarinet in B-flat, and the fifth on bassoon and contrabassoon. The excised reed parts and the larger string section were used for the synthesizer parts upon their removal for the licensed orchestration..

The "Alternate Orchestration", offered by Music Theatre International when licensing the show, is a reduced orchestration for 11 players. It is scored for percussion (including Drum Kit, Glockenspiel and other instruments), double bass, three woodwind players, a brass section consisting of a trumpet (doubling on flugelhorn) and French horn, violin, cello, synthesizer and piano (optionally doubling synthesized harp and celeste). This orchestration has the option to be piano conducted (the conductor plays the piano part and conducts), though some shows have a separate conductor and pianist.

For the Stage Entertainment productions of the show; Danny Troob re-orchestrated the score for 14 players. This new arrangement was mostly based on the licensed orchestration, with the string section played on keyboard 3. It was scored for three synthesizers, a percussion section, (including drums and glockenspiel), double bass, three woodwind players, two French horns in F, a trombone (doubling on bass trombone and tuba), two trumpets in B-flat, and a harp. However, Stage Entertainment soon started reducing the size of their orchestras for the production, replacing musicians with the electronic software KeyComp. The pit for the Paris production and for the 2015 Dutch revival were composed of seven musicians (two keyboards, three woodwind players, a percussion section, and a single French horn).

The third UK tour of the musical introduced reworked dance arrangements, and a new orchestration and vocal arrangements (some of them closer to the 2017 movie). The score was reorchestrated for 10 players, who play using the electronic software KeyComp. It is scored for two synthesizers, two woodwind players, 1 trombone (doubling bass trombone), 1 French horn in F, 1 trumpet in B flat, 1 violin, 1 cello and a player playing both percussion and a drum kit.

== Recordings ==
The Original Broadway Cast Recording was released on April 26, 1994. The CD included Susan Egan as Belle, Terrence Mann as Beast, Burke Moses as Gaston, Gary Beach as Lumière, Tom Bosley as Maurice, Anna McNeeley as Madame de la Grande Bouche and Beth Fowler as Mrs. Potts. The album was certified gold by the RIAA on December 7, 2000.

The Original Australian Cast Recording was released in 1995. The principal cast included Rachael Beck as Belle, Michael Cormick as Beast, Hugh Jackman as Gaston, Ernie Bourne as Maurice, Toni Lamond as Madame de la Grande Bouche, Grant Smith as Lumière, Robyn Arthur as Mrs. Potts and Bert Newton as Cogsworth.

The Original Vienna Cast Recording was released in 1996. The principal cast included Ethan Freeman as Beast, Caroline Vasicek as Belle, Kevin Tarte as Gaston, Viktor Gernot as Lumière, Ann Mandrella as Babette, and Rosita Mewis as Mrs. Potts.

The Original London Cast Recording was released in 1997. The principal cast included Julie-Alanah Brighten as Belle, Alasdair Harvey as Beast, Burke Moses once again as Gaston, Derek Griffiths as Lumière and Mary Millar as Mrs. Potts.

The Original Stuttgart Cast Recording was released in 1998. The principal cast included Uwe Kroger as Beast and Leah Delos Santos as Belle and Ann Mandrella as Babette.

The Original Madrid Cast Recording was released in 1999. The principal cast included Xenia Reguant as Belle, Carlos Marín as Beast, Lisardo Guarinos as Gaston, Víctor Ullate Roche as LeFou, Germán Torres as Lumière, David Venancio Muro as Cogsworth and Kirby Navarro as Mrs. Potts. A second cast recording for the new production was released in May 2008, starring Julia Möller as Belle, David Ordinas as Beast, Pablo Puyol as Gaston, Raúl Peña as LeFou, Armando Pita as Lumière, Esteban Oliver as Cogsworth and Angels Jiménez as Mrs. Potts.

The Original Dutch Cast Recording was released in 2005. The principal cast included Chantal Janzen as Belle, Stanley Burleson as Beast, René van Kooten as Gaston, Carlo Boszhard as Lumière, Ger Otte as Tickens (Cogsworth) and Mariska van Kolck as Mrs. Potts.

== Critical reception ==
Reception towards the tryouts in Houston were so enthusiastic that the production was extended for two weeks. Jerome Weeks of Variety responded to the show with a positive review, praising the performances of Egan, Mann and Moses, as well as the Beast's new song "If I Can't Love Her". At the same time, Weeks felt that the production "gets close to slipping into a big-budget kiddie show or magic act with its overdone showbiz glitz and sparkly stage-illusion effects" at times, but in the end predicted that "'Beauty and the Beast' could well be the big new musical hit this Broadway season has been waiting for." However, in 1994, Beauty and the Beast finally premiered on Broadway to reviews that ranged from mixed to negative, leaving critics mostly unimpressed. Reactions from the New York theater community and Broadway producers were particularly harsh, ridiculing Disney for deciding to produce the musical themselves as opposed to enlisting traditional theater companies. Egan recalled that "the same five families [had] produced Broadway shows for a hundred years and Disney shook that up."

Nearly universally panned by theater critics, they concurred that Beauty and the Beast was a "great spectacle, but not great theater". Likening the musical to the Empire State Building, David Richards of The New York Times called the show "hardly a triumph of art, but it'll probably be a whale of a tourist attraction." While awarding specific praise towards its musical numbers, choreography, costumes and cast – particularly Mann's ability to "convey the delicacy of awakening love" despite the physical demands of his costume, at the same time Richards criticized the production's set and special effects for lacking subtlety, ultimately accusing them of leaving little "to the imagination". Richards concluded, "The result is a sightseer's delight, which isn't the same thing as a theatergoer's dream." Also writing for The New York Times, Vincent Canby disparaged the musical entirely as "relentlessly bland, busy, upbeat and robotlike", criticizing the production for resembling "a dinner theater". Canby felt that the new Menken-Rice songs were "inferior" to the originals, likened the special effects to Fourth of July sparklers, criticized the sound engineering for ranging from too loud to barely audible, and panning Woolverton's book for failing to supplement her screenplay. Minor praise was awarded to the performances of Lamberts, Beach and Fowler, as well as Mann's climactic beast-to-prince transformation. In addition to predicting that Beauty and the Beast would be derided by traditional Broadway theatre-goers and critics alike, Variety writer Jeremy Gerard was largely negative in his own review. While admitting that the production "boasts several real pluses", Gerard criticized the show for appearing "bloated, padded, gimmick-ridden, tacky and ... utterly devoid of imagination." The critic voiced his strong disapproval of the costumes while dismissing the set as "something designed to be seen by people in moving seats, maybe at Disneyland", panning West's choreography and ultimately deriding Roth's directing and blocking of actors who "look generally like they're following dotted lines on the stage." Critics agreed that Roth's direction and West's were equally uninspired. In a mixed review with a headline reading "Beauty and the Beast isn't magical in the least, even if it does bristle with magic tricks", New York's John Simon wrote that the production resembles "a belated infomercial" for the film by which he was bored, yet impressed by its special effects and illusions. Simon also felt that the actors struggled to resemble their animated counterparts despite Hould-Ward's costumes, criticizing Egan's acting, Woolverton's dialogue and the new Menken-Rice numbers while praising Moses', Beach's and Fowler's performances.

Audiences did not share critics' negative opinions, and the musical famously resonated with the public and families. Children were especially delighted by the idea of their favorite movie performed on stage by live actors. Subsequent productions have gradually attracted kinder remarks; the national tours in particular have been well received. Reviewing a performance of the musical at the Shubert Theatre in Los Angeles in 1995, Tom Jacobs of Variety wrote, "Born in Hollywood as an animated film, Disney's version of 'Beauty and the Beast' has returned home as an opulent stage musical, a year after its Broadway bow. Both good and bad choices have been made in adapting the 1991 film, but with its outstanding performances, fantastic production values and memorable score, this show should warm the hearts of all but the most curmudgeonly theatergoers." However, Jacobs felt that the production suffered from the lack of danger felt watching the film. After having been left unimpressed upon viewing the original Broadway production, Variety's Matt Wolf was pleasantly surprised by the musical's West End debut one year later.

== Awards and nominations ==
"Be Our Guest" was used as the commercial for the 1994 Tony Awards. Michael Goldstein of New York correctly predicted that Mann would earn a Tony Award nomination for his performance. Despite having been nominated for a total of nine individual awards, Beauty and the Beast was ultimately shunned at the ceremony, winning only one award – Best Costume Design – for Hould-Ward. Nominated for the Tony Award for Best Musical, the production famously lost to Stephen Sondheim's Passion, which is considered to be his own version of the "Beauty and the Beast" fairy tale. In 1995, some of Hould-Ward's costumes, namely Lumiere, were put on display in Nordstrom stores. Meanwhile, Belle and the Beast's ballroom costumes were exhibited at Westside Pavilion, and Mrs. Potts and LeFou appeared at South Coast Plaza.

=== Original Broadway production ===
Year	Award	Category	Nominee	Result
1994	Tony Awards			
1994	Tony Awards	Best Musical		Nominated
1994	Tony Awards	Best Book of a Musical	Linda Woolverton	Nominated
1994	Tony Awards	Best Original Score	Alan Menken, Howard Ashman, and Tim Rice	Nominated
1994	Tony Awards	Best Performance by a Leading Actor in a Musical	Terrence Mann	Nominated
1994	Tony Awards	Best Performance by a Leading Actress in a Musical	Susan Egan	Nominated
1994	Tony Awards	Best Performance by a Featured Actor in a Musical	Gary Beach	Nominated
1994	Tony Awards	Best Direction of a Musical	Robert Jess Roth	Nominated
1994	Tony Awards	Best Costume Design	Ann Hould-Ward	Won
1994	Tony Awards	Best Lighting Design	Natasha Katz	Nominated
1994	Drama Desk Award			
1994	Drama Desk Award	Outstanding Musical		Nominated
1994	Drama Desk Award	Outstanding Actor in a Musical	Terrence Mann	Nominated
1994	Drama Desk Award	Outstanding Actress in a Musical	Susan Egan	Nominated
1994	Drama Desk Award	Outstanding Featured Actor in a Musical	Burke Moses	Nominated
1994	Drama Desk Award	Outstanding Choreography	Matt West	Nominated
1994	Drama Desk Award	Outstanding Orchestrations	Danny Troob	Nominated
1994	Drama Desk Award	Outstanding Lyrics	Howard Ashman and Tim Rice	Nominated
1994	Drama Desk Award	Outstanding Music	Alan Menken	Nominated
1994	Drama Desk Award	Outstanding Sound Design	T. Richard Fitzgerald	Nominated
1994	Drama Desk Award	Outstanding Special Effects	Jim Steinmeyer and John Gaughan	Nominated

=== Original London production ===
Year	Award	Category	Nominee	Result
1998	Laurence Olivier Award	Best New Musical		Won
1998	Laurence Olivier Award	Best Theatre Choreographer	Matt West	Nominated
1998	Laurence Olivier Award	Best Costume Design	Ann Hould-Ward	Nominated

== Impact and legacy ==
Largely due to audience reception, Beauty and the Beast remains one of Broadway's biggest successes of the current era. Beauty and the Beast established itself as a musical that could survive on Broadway despite its unenthusiastic reviews. Several detractors had thought that musicals like Beauty and the Beast would be a one-time event, but the results ultimately turned out to be quite the opposite. According to theatrical producer Stuart Oken, Disney's success with Beauty and the Beast is responsible for today's biggest Broadway hits and making the medium "better than it has ever been". The groundbreaking performance of Beauty and the Beast inspired other major Hollywood studios to produce Broadway renditions of some of their own films. Disney soon began to commission Broadway adaptations of several of the studio's most popular musical films, namely The Lion King (1997), Mary Poppins (2004), Tarzan (2006), The Little Mermaid (2008), Newsies (2012), Aladdin (2014), and Frozen (2018), in addition to producing the musical Aida. After completing her run in Beauty and the Beast, Egan would famously go on to voice Meg in Disney's animated musical Hercules (1997), establishing herself as a popular voice and film actress. Following the success of "Human Again", the song was later incorporated into reissues of the animated film in the form of an animated musical sequence.

Beauty and the Beast is considered to be Broadway's first legitimate family show, responsible for birthing an entirely new generation of young theatergoers. The family demographic of the musical established inspired international productions of Aladdin and Matilda. According to The Complete Book of 1990s Broadway Musicals author Dan Dietz, "the show's resounding success opened the floodgates for a spate of ... productions based on Disney and other family-oriented films", transforming Broadway into "a theme park with a parade of musicals aimed at kids and teenagers." Dietz believes that the plethora of Broadway musicals that came after Beauty and the Beast have unfortunately resembled "feel-good family show[s] whose goal was to emulate its film source." Additionally, the success of the musical inspired a legion of Broadway productions geared towards young women, including Hairspray (2002), Wicked (2003), Legally Blonde (2007), Matilda (2013) and Rodgers and Hammerstein's Cinderella (2013). While these musicals flourished on Broadway, it seems as though more serious, adult-oriented fare struggled to perform as well. New York theater critic Howard Kissel famously despised "the Kiddy Komponent of New York theatergoing" spearheaded by the successful 13-year Broadway run of Beauty and the Beast. The success of Beauty and the Beast inspired Eisner to invest in his own theater to house future stage adaptations of the studio's animated classics.

Original arrangements of some of the show's original songs can be heard playing in the Belle's Village area of Fantasyland in Tokyo Disneyland, which opened September 28, 2020.
