= Matt West =

American choreographer

Matt West is a choreographer and actor. He choreographed the first Broadway production of Beauty and the Beast. He won a Drama-Logue Award for his work on that show.

His acting credits include the role of Bobby in the Broadway musical A Chorus Line. He reprised this role in the 1985 movie version directed by Richard Attenborough.

West co-produced and choreographed Lestat, a musical based on the Vampire Lestat stories by Anne Rice.
