= Ashley Brown =

American actress and singer

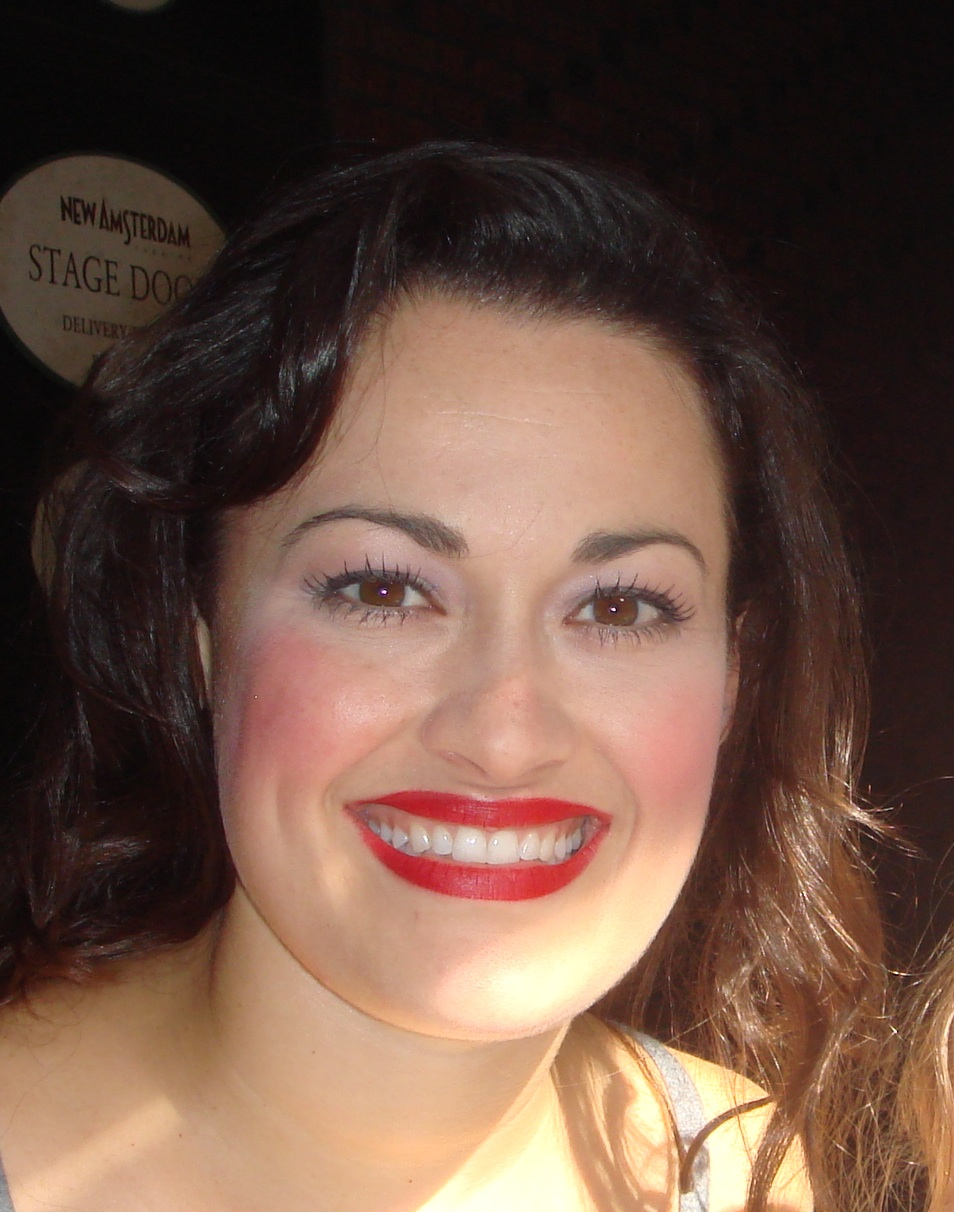
- Born: February 3, 1982 (age 44); Gulf Breeze, Florida, U.S.
- Education: University of Cincinnati (BFA)
- Occupations: Actor; singer; dancer
- Years active: 2004–present
- Spouse: Daniel Wisler (m. 2011)
- Children: 1

Ashley Brown (born February 3, 1982) is an American singer and actress who is best known for playing the titular character in the United States national tour and Broadway productions of Mary Poppins.

== Early life ==
Brown was born February 3, 1982, in Gulf Breeze, Pensacola, Florida, the youngest of four children. She started singing when she was 6 years old and then started professional singing lessons when she was 14. She studied at Cincinnati College-Conservatory of Music.

== Career ==
Brown initially caught the attention of casting director Tara Rubin not long after graduating from the Cincinnati College-Conservatory of Music. After a successful audition, she was cast in the Disney touring production On the Record. This in turn led to her Broadway debut on September 20, 2005, replacing Brooke Tansley as the lead character, Belle, in the Disney Theatrical production of Beauty and the Beast. She departed the role on May 28, 2006, after eight months and she was succeeded by Sarah Litzsinger.

On November 16, 2006, Mary Poppins opened on Broadway with Brown starring as the title character. Brown left the Broadway company on October 5, 2008, after playing the role for two years and was replaced by Scarlett Strallen who previously played the role in the West End.

In March 2007, Brown appeared on All My Children as herself.

On March 11, 2009, Brown reprised the role of Mary Poppins in the US national tour. She left the tour on February 7, 2010, and was succeeded by Caroline Sheen.

On October 20, 2009, Brown performed the role of Snow White in the world symphonic premiere of Snow White and the Seven Dwarfs – A Symphonic Retelling, at the Walt Disney Concert Hall in Los Angeles, conducted by John Mauceri.

She has recorded her first solo album of American songbook standards, which was released in January 2010.

Brown played Maria in The Muny production of The Sound of Music, which ran from July 26 to August 1, 2010. For this role she won the Kevin Kline Award for Outstanding Actress in a Musical.

Brown starred as Oona in the world-premiere of the new musical Limelight: The Story of Charlie Chaplin, which ran at the La Jolla Playhouse from September 7 through October 17, 2010.

Brown played the role of Mary Poppins again in the Broadway production from March 8 to July 17, 2011, while Laura Michelle Kelly was away filming a movie.

Brown played Magnolia Hawks alongside Nathan Gunn as Gaylord Ravenal, Alyson Cambridge as Julie LaVerne, and Morris Robinson as Joe, in Francesca Zambello's production of Show Boat for the Lyric Opera of Chicago, which ran from February 12 to March 17, 2012. It was broadcast on NPR stations in June 2012, the first time a complete performance of Show Boat has ever been broadcast on radio.

In 2013, Brown made her sold-out solo Carnegie Hall debut with the New York Pops as well as having a minor role in the television broadcast The Sound of Music Live!, in which she played Ursula, one of the servants in the Von Trapp household.

In 2015, she sang "A Kiss Goodnight" by Richard M. Sherman, the exit song from Disneyland Forever, a production that commemorated Disneyland's 60th anniversary.

Brown played the Mother Abbess in the national tour of The Sound of Music, which launched September 2015. She then played Mrs. Juniper and Madame Calypso in the 2017 Encores! production of The Golden Apple, and returned to Carnegie Hall with the New York Pops in December 2018. She returned to Broadway in the 2024 revival of Elf the Musical playing the role of Emily Hobbs.

== Personal life ==
Brown became engaged to actor Daniel Wisler on April 18, 2010; they married November 5, 2011. Brown gave birth to a baby girl on May 9, 2016.

== Awards and nominations ==
Year	Award	Category	Show	Result
2006	Drama Desk Award	Outstanding Actress in a Musical	Mary Poppins	Nominated
2006	Austin Critics Table Award	Distinguished Performance	Mary Poppins	Nominated
2006	Outer Critics Circle Award	Outstanding Actress in a Musical	Mary Poppins	Nominated
2009	PBS Telly Award	Film Video – TV Programs, Segments, or Promotional Pieces - Entertainment	Ashley Brown: Call Me Irresponsible	Won
2010	Kevin Kline Award	Best Actress in a Musical	The Sound of Music	Won

== Theatre credits ==
Year	Title	Role	Venue	Other notes
2004	Meet Me in St. Louis	Rose	The Muny	
2005–2006	Beauty and the Beast	Belle	Lunt-Fontanne Theatre	
2006–2008	Mary Poppins	Mary Poppins	New Amsterdam Theatre	Original Broadway cast member Nominated Outer Critics Circle Award for Outstanding Actress in a Musical; Nominated Drama League Award for Distinguished Performance; Nominated Drama Desk Award for Outstanding Actress in a Musical
2010	The Sound of Music	Maria	The Muny	Winner Kevin Kline Award for Outstanding Lead Actress in a Musical
2010	Limelight: The Story of Charlie Chaplin	Oona	La Jolla Playhouse	Out-of-town tryout for Chaplin: The Musical
2011	Mary Poppins	Mary Poppins	New Amsterdam Theatre	Return to role
2012	Show Boat	Magnolia Hawks	Lyric Opera of Chicago	
2013	Oklahoma!	Laurey Williams	Lyric Opera of Chicago	
2013	Hello Dolly!	Irene Molloy	Goodspeed Opera House	
2015	My Fair Lady	Eliza Doolittle	Cape Playhouse	
2017	The Golden Apple	Mrs. Juniper/Madame Calypso	Encores!	
2019	Cinderella	Marie/Fairy Godmother	The Muny	
2024–2025	Elf the Musical	Emily Hobbs	Marquis Theatre	
2025	Come from Away	Diane and Others	The Muny	

=== Tours ===
Year	Tour title	Role
2004–2005	On the Record	Kristen
2009–2010	Mary Poppins	Mary Poppins
2015–2016	The Sound of Music	Mother Abbess

== Discography ==
Year	Title	Other notes
2004	Disney's On the Record	
2009	Speak Low	
2018	The Secret of Christmas	
