= List of awards and nominations received by Alan Menken =

Alan Menken awards and nominations
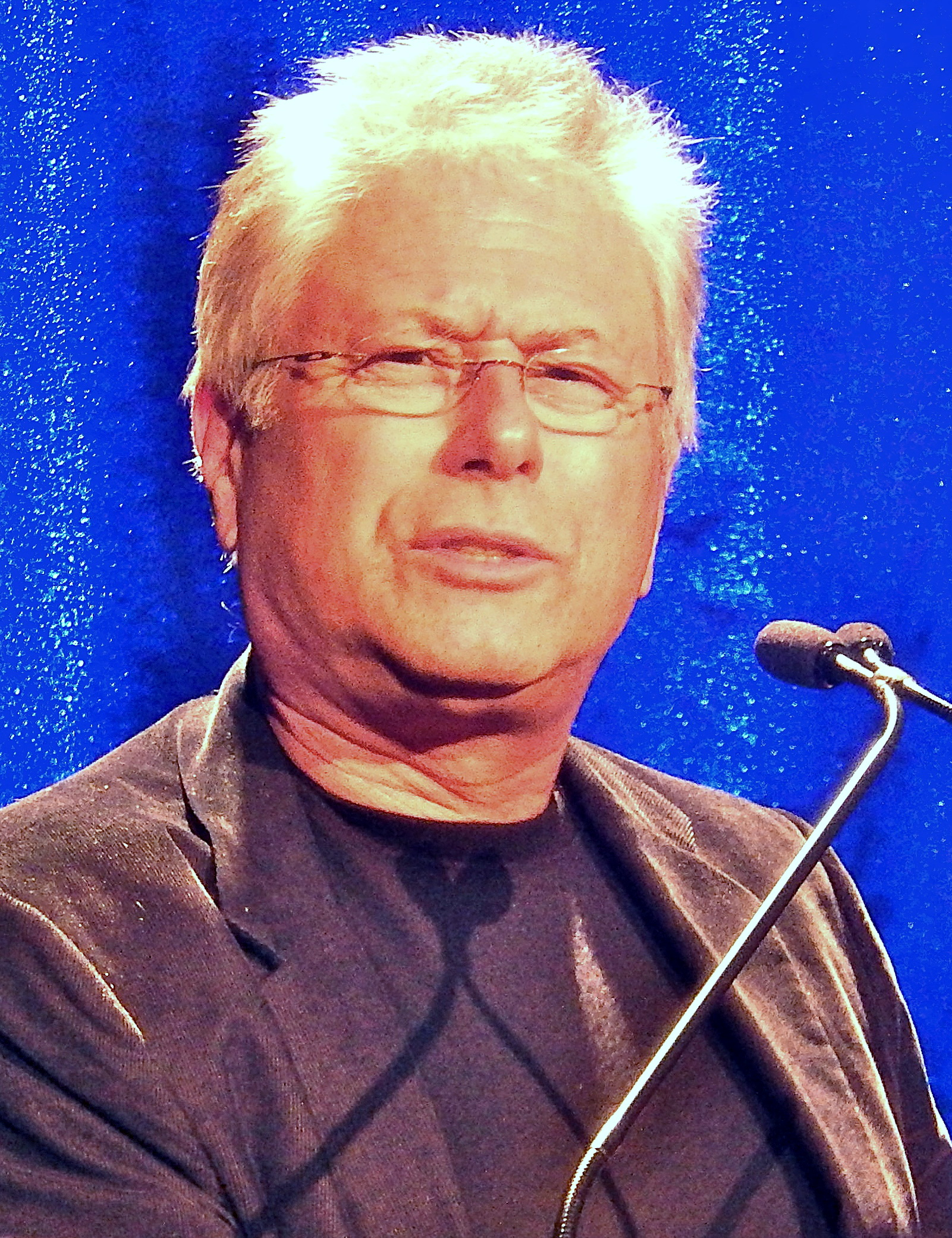
- Menken in 2013
Awards and nominations
Award	Wins	Nominations
Academy Awards	8	19
BAFTA Awards	0	2
Critics' Choice Awards	0	5
Emmy Awards	1	3
Golden Globe Awards	7	16
Grammy Awards	11	26
Laurence Olivier Awards	1	3
Tony Awards	1	5

Totals (Note: Certain award groups do not simply award one winner. They acknowledge several different recipients, have runners-up, and have third place. Since this is a specific recognition and is different from losing an award, runner-up mentions are considered wins in this award tally. For simplification and to avoid errors, each award in this list has been presumed to have had a prior nomination.)
- Wins: 58
- Nominations: 170

This is a list of awards and nominations received by Alan Menken.

Alan Menken is an American composer known for his work on film, television and theater. Menken has been recognized with several accolades including 8 Academy Awards, 7 Golden Globe Awards, 11 Grammy Awards, a Daytime Emmy Award, a Laurence Olivier Award and a Tony Award as well as nominations for two BAFTA Awards, five Critics' Choice Awards, and two Primetime Emmy Awards.

For his work in film he earned 19 Academy Award nominations winning 8 Oscars for The Little Mermaid (1989), Beauty and the Beast (1991), Aladdin (1992), and Pocahontas (1995). He also earned 16 Golden Globe Award nominations winning 7 awards. He has earned two British Academy Film Award nominations, and five Critics' Choice Movie Award nominations. For his work in theatre he received five Tony Award nominations winning once, and 2 Laurence Olivier Awards winning once. He also received 26 Grammy Awards nominations, winning 11 awards. For his work in television he has earned two Emmy Awards.

== Major awards ==
=== Academy Awards ===
Year	Category	Nominated work	Result	Ref.
1986	Best Original Song (Note: Shared with Howard Ashman)	"Mean Green Mother from Outer Space" (from Little Shop of Horrors)	Nominated	
1989	Best Original Score	The Little Mermaid	Won	
1989	Best Original Song (Note: Shared with Howard Ashman)	"Kiss the Girl" (from The Little Mermaid)	Nominated	
1989	Best Original Song	"Under the Sea" (from The Little Mermaid)	Won	
1991	Best Original Score	Beauty and the Beast	Won	
1991	Best Original Song (Note: Shared with Howard Ashman)	"Beauty and the Beast" (from Beauty and the Beast)	Won	
1991	Best Original Song	"Be Our Guest" (from Beauty and the Beast)	Nominated	
1991	Best Original Song	"Belle" (from Beauty and the Beast)	Nominated	
1992	Best Original Score	Aladdin	Won	
1992	Best Original Song (Note: Shared with Howard Ashman)	"Friend Like Me" (from Aladdin)	Nominated	
1992	Best Original Song (Note: Shared with Tim Rice)	"A Whole New World" (from Aladdin)	Won	
1995	Best Original Musical or Comedy Score (Note: Shared with Stephen Schwartz)	Pocahontas	Won	
1995	Best Original Song (Note: Shared with Stephen Schwartz)	"Colors of the Wind" (from Pocahontas)	Won	
1996	Best Original Musical or Comedy Score (Note: Shared with Stephen Schwartz)	The Hunchback of Notre Dame	Nominated	
1997	Best Original Song (Note: Shared with David Zippel)	"Go the Distance" (from Hercules)	Nominated	
2007	Best Original Song (Note: Shared with Stephen Schwartz)	"Happy Working Song" (from Enchanted)	Nominated	
2007	Best Original Song	"So Close" (from Enchanted)	Nominated	
2007	Best Original Song	"That's How You Know" (from Enchanted)	Nominated	
2010	Best Original Song (Note: Shared with Glenn Slater)	"I See the Light" (from Tangled)	Nominated	

=== BAFTA Awards ===
Year	Category	Nominated work	Result	Ref.
British Academy Film Awards
1992	Best Original Film Score	Beauty and the Beast (Shared with Howard Ashman)	Nominated	
1993	Best Original Film Score	Aladdin	Nominated	

=== Critics' Choice Awards ===
Year	Category	Nominated work	Result	Ref.
Critics' Choice Movie Awards
2007	Best Composer	Enchanted	Nominated	
2007	Best Song	"That's How You Know" (from Enchanted); Shared with Stephen Schwartz	Nominated	
2010	Best Song	"I See the Light" (from Tangled); Shared with Glenn Slater	Nominated	
2017	Best Song	"Evermore" (from Beauty and the Beast); Shared with Tim Rice	Nominated	
2019	Best Song	"Speechless" (from Aladdin); Shared with Benj Pasek and Justin Paul	Nominated	

=== Emmy Awards ===
Year	Category	Nominated work	Result	Ref.
Primetime Emmy Awards
2013	Outstanding Original Music and Lyrics (Note: Shared with Glenn Slater)	"More or Less the Kind of Thing You May or May Not Possibly See on Broadway" (from The Neighbors)	Nominated	
2016	Outstanding Original Music and Lyrics	"A New Season" from Galavant (episode: "A New Season")	Nominated	
Children's and Family Emmy Awards
2026	Outstanding Music Direction and Composition for an Animated Program	Spellbound	Nominated	
2026	Outstanding Original Song for a Children’s and Young Teen Program (Note: Shared with Glenn Slater)	"The Way It Was Before" from Spellbound	Nominated	
Daytime Emmy Awards
2021	Outstanding Original Song for a Preschool, Children’s or Animated Program (Note: Shared with Glenn Slater)	"Nothing Left To Lose" from Tangled: The Series (episode: "Cassandra's Revenge")	Nominated	
2020	Outstanding Original Song in a Children's, Young Adult or Animated Program (Note: Shared with Glenn Slater)	"Waiting in the Wings" from Tangled: The Series (episode: "Rapunzel and the Great Tree")	Won	
Special Emmy Awards
1990	Outstanding contribution to the success of the Academy's anti-drug special for children (Note: Shared with Howard Ashman)	"Wonderful Ways to Say No" (from Cartoon All-Stars to the Rescue)	Won	

=== Golden Globe Awards ===
Year	Category	Nominated work	Result	Ref.
1989	Best Original Score	The Little Mermaid	Won	
1989	Best Original Song	"Kiss the Girl" (from The Little Mermaid); Shared with Howard Ashman	Nominated	
1989	Best Original Song	"Under the Sea" (from The Little Mermaid); Shared with Howard Ashman	Won	
1991	Best Original Score	Beauty and the Beast	Won	
1991	Best Original Song	"Beauty and the Beast" (from Beauty and the Beast); Shared with Howard Ashman	Won	
1991	Best Original Song	"Be Our Guest" (from Beauty and the Beast); Shared with Howard Ashman	Nominated	
1992	Best Original Score	Aladdin	Won	
1992	Best Original Song	"Friend Like Me" (from Aladdin); Shared with Howard Ashman	Nominated	
1992	Best Original Song	"Prince Ali" (from Aladdin); Shared with Howard Ashman	Nominated	
1992	Best Original Song	"A Whole New World" (from Aladdin); Shared with Tim Rice	Won	
1995	Best Original Score	Pocahontas	Nominated	
1995	Best Original Song	"Colors of the Wind" (from Pocahontas); Shared with Stephen Schwartz	Won	
1996	Best Original Score	The Hunchback of Notre Dame	Nominated	
1997	Best Original Song	"Go the Distance" (from Hercules); Shared with David Zippel	Nominated	
2007	Best Original Song	"That's How You Know" (from Enchanted); Shared with Stephen Schwartz)	Nominated	
2010	Best Original Song	"I See the Light" (from Tangled); Shared with Glenn Slater	Nominated	

=== Grammy Awards ===
Year	Category	Nominated work	Result	Ref.
1984	Best Cast Show Album	Little Shop of Horrors; Shared with Howard Ashman and Phil Ramone	Nominated	
1991	Best Recording for Children	The Little Mermaid: Original Walt Disney Records Soundtrack; Shared with Howard Ashman	Won	
1991	Best Score Soundtrack for Visual Media	The Little Mermaid: Original Walt Disney Records Soundtrack	Nominated	
1991	Best Song Written for Visual Media	"Kiss the Girl" (from The Little Mermaid); Shared with Howard Ashman	Nominated	
1991	Best Song Written for Visual Media	"Under the Sea" (from The Little Mermaid); Shared with Howard Ashman	Won	
1993	Album of the Year	Beauty and the Beast: Original Motion Picture Soundtrack; Shared with Various Artists	Nominated	
1993	Song of the Year	"Beauty and the Beast" (from Beauty and the Beast); Shared with Howard Ashman	Nominated	
1993	Best Album for Children	Beauty and the Beast: Original Motion Picture Soundtrack; Shared with Howard Ashman	Won	
1993	Best Score Soundtrack for Visual Media	Beauty and the Beast: Original Motion Picture Soundtrack	Won	
1993	Best Song Written for Visual Media	"Beauty and the Beast" (from Beauty and the Beast); Shared with Howard Ashman	Won	
1994	Song of the Year	"A Whole New World" (from Aladdin); Shared with Tim Rice	Won	
1994	Best Musical Album for Children	Aladdin: Original Motion Picture Soundtrack; Shared with Tim Rice	Won	
1994	Best Score Soundtrack for Visual Media	Aladdin: Original Motion Picture Soundtrack	Won	
1994	Best Song Written for Visual Media	"Friend Like Me" (from Aladdin); Shared with Howard Ashman	Nominated	
1994	Best Song Written for Visual Media	"A Whole New World" (from Aladdin); Shared with Tim Rice	Won	
1995	Best Musical Show Album	Beauty and the Beast: A New Musical	Nominated	
1996	Best Musical Album for Children	Pocahontas Sing-Along; Shared with Stephen Schwartz	Nominated	
1996	Best Song Written for Visual Media	"Colors of the Wind" (from Pocahontas); Shared with Stephen Schwartz	Won	
2009	Best Musical Show Album	The Little Mermaid: Original Broadway Cast Recording; Shared with Bruce Botnick, Michael Kosarin and Chris Montan	Nominated	
2009	Best Song Written for Visual Media	"Ever Ever After" (from Enchanted); Shared with Stephen Schwartz	Nominated	
2009	Best Song Written for Visual Media	"That's How You Know" (from Enchanted); Shared with Stephen Schwartz	Nominated	
2012	Best Compilation Soundtrack for Visual Media	Tangled	Nominated	
2012	Best Song Written for Visual Media	"I See the Light" (from Tangled); Shared with Glenn Slater	Won	
2013	Best Musical Theater Album	Newsies: Original Broadway Cast Recording	Nominated	
2015	Best Musical Theater Album	Aladdin: Original Broadway Cast Recording	Nominated	
2021	Best Musical Theater Album	Little Shop of Horrors: The New Off-Broadway Cast	Nominated	

=== Laurence Olivier Awards ===
Year	Category	Nominated work	Result	Ref.
1983	Musical of the Year	Little Shop of Horrors (Shared with Howard Ashman)	Nominated	
1998	Best New Musical	Beauty and the Beast (Shared with Howard Ashman & Tim Rice)	Won	
2010	Best New Musical	Sister Act (Shared with Glenn Slater)	Nominated	

=== Tony Awards ===
Year	Category	Nominated work	Result	Ref.
1994	Best Original Score	Beauty and the Beast (Shared with Howard Ashman and Tim Rice)	Nominated	
2008	Best Original Score	The Little Mermaid (Shared with Howard Ashman and Glenn Slater)	Nominated	
2011	Best Original Score	Sister Act (Shared with Glenn Slater)	Nominated	
2012	Best Original Score	Newsies (Shared with Jack Feldman)	Won	
2014	Best Original Score	Aladdin (Shared with Howard Ashman, Tim Rice and Chad Beguelin)	Nominated	

== Miscellaneous awards ==
Organizations	Year	Category	Nominated work	Result	Ref.
Annie Awards	1995	Outstanding Music in an Animated Feature	Pocahontas (Note: Shared with Stephen Schwartz)	Won	
Annie Awards	1996	Outstanding Music in an Animated Feature	The Hunchback of Notre Dame (Note: Shared with Stephen Schwartz)	Nominated	
Annie Awards	2018	Outstanding Music in an Animated Feature	Ralph Breaks the Internet (Note: Shared with Henry Jackman, Phil Johnston, Tom MacDougall and Dan Reynolds)	Nominated	
Annie Awards	2018	Outstanding Music in an Animated Series	Tangled: The Series (Note: Shared with Glenn Slater and Kevin Kleisch)	Nominated	
BMI Film & TV Awards	1990	BMI Film Music Award	The Little Mermaid	Won	
BMI Film & TV Awards	1992	BMI Film Music Award	Beauty and the Beast	Won	
BMI Film & TV Awards	1993	BMI Film Music Award	Aladdin	Won	
BMI Film & TV Awards	1994	Most Performed Song from a Film	"A Whole New World" (from Aladdin) (Note: Shared with Tim Rice)	Won	
BMI Film & TV Awards	1996	BMI Film Music Award	Pocahontas	Won	
BMI Film & TV Awards	1997	BMI Film Music Award	The Hunchback of Notre Dame	Won	
BMI Film & TV Awards	1998	BMI Film Music Award	Hercules	Won	
BMI Film & TV Awards	1998	Richard Kirk Career Achievement Award	—N/a	Won	
BMI Film & TV Awards	2008	BMI Film Music Award	Enchanted	Won	
BMI Film & TV Awards	2013	BMI Film Music Award	Mirror Mirror	Won	
Drama Desk Awards	1983	Outstanding Music	Little Shop of Horrors	Nominated	
Drama Desk Awards	1994	Outstanding Music	Beauty and the Beast	Nominated	
Drama Desk Awards	2011	Outstanding Music	Sister Act	Nominated	
Drama Desk Awards	2012	Outstanding Music	Leap of Faith	Nominated	
Drama Desk Awards	2012	Outstanding Music	Newsies	Won	
Drama Desk Awards	2014	Outstanding Music	Aladdin	Nominated	
Drama League Awards	2012	Distinguished Achievement in Musical Theatre	Himself	Won	
Evening Standard Theatre Awards	1983	Best Musical	Little Shop of Horrors (Note: Shared with Howard Ashman)	Won	
French Mickey d'Or	2007	Best Music	Enchanted	Nominated	
French Mickey d'Or	2007	Best Song	"Happy Working Song" (from Enchanted) (Note: Shared with Stephen Schwartz)	Nominated	
French Mickey d'Or	2007	Best Song	"That's How You Know" (Note: (from Enchanted)); Shared with Stephen Schwartz	Nominated	
French Mickey d'Or	2010	Best Music	Tangled	Won	
French Mickey d'Or	2010	Best Song	"I See the Light" (from Tangled) (Note: Shared with Glenn Slater)	Won	
French Mickey d'Or	2017	Best Music	Beauty and the Beast	Won	
French Mickey d'Or	2017	Best Song	"Evermore" (from Beauty and the Beast) (Note: Shared with Tim Rice)	Nominated	
French Mickey d'Or	2017	Best Song	"How Does a Moment Last Forever" (from Beauty and the Beast) (Note: Shared with Tim Rice)	Nominated	
French Mickey d'Or	2019	Best Song	"Speechless" (from Aladdin) (Note: Shared with Benj Pasek and Justin Paul)	Nominated	
Georgia Film Critics Association	2011	Best Original Song	"Star Spangled Man" (from Captain America: The First Avenger) (Note: Shared with David Zippel)	Nominated	
Gold Derby Awards	2007	Best Original Score	Enchanted	Nominated	
Gold Derby Awards	2007	Best Original Song	"Happy Working Song" (from Enchanted) (Note: Shared with Stephen Schwartz)	Nominated	
Gold Derby Awards	2007	Best Original Song	"That's How You Know" (from Enchanted) (Note: Shared with Stephen Schwartz)	Nominated	
Gold Derby Awards	2010	Best Original Song	"I See the Light" (from Tangled) (Note: Shared with Glenn Slater)	Won	
Gold Derby Awards	2018	Best Original Song	"Evermore" (from Beauty and the Beast) (Note: Shared with Tim Rice)	Nominated	
Golden Raspberry Awards	1990	Worst Original Song	"The Measure of a Man" (from Rocky V)	Nominated	
Golden Raspberry Awards	1992	Worst Original Song	"High Times, Hard Times" (from Newsies) (Note: Shared with Jack Feldman)	Won (Note: Became the first person to win both a Razzie and an Oscar (for Aladdin (1992)) in the same year. Menken officially accepted this Razzie and has spoken proudly of it in interviews since.)	
Hawaii Film Critics Society	2017	Best Song	"Evermore" (from Beauty and the Beast) (Note: Shared with Tim Rice)	Nominated	
Hawaii Film Critics Society	2019	Best Song	"Speechless" (from Aladdin) (Note: Shared with Benj Pasek and Justin Paul)	Nominated	
Hollywood Film Awards	2019	Hollywood Song Award	"Speechless" (from Aladdin) (Note: Shared with Benj Pasek and Justin Paul)	Nominated	
Hollywood Music in Media Awards	2016	Best Original Song in an Animated Film	"The Great Beyond" (from Sausage Party); Shared with Glenn Slater, Seth Rogen and Evan Goldberg	Nominated	
Hollywood Music in Media Awards	2017	Best Original Song in an Animated Film	"How Does a Moment Last Forever" (from Beauty and the Beast); Shared with Tim Rice	Nominated	
Hollywood Music in Media Awards	2017	Best Original Song in a Sci-Fi, Fantasy or Horror Film	"How Does a Moment Last Forever" (from Beauty and the Beast); Shared with Tim Rice	Won	
Hollywood Music in Media Awards	2017	Best Original Song in a Sci-Fi, Fantasy or Horror Film	"Evermore" (from Beauty and the Beast); Shared with Tim Rice	Nominated	
Hollywood Music in Media Awards	2019	Best Original Song in a Feature Film	"Speechless" (from Aladdin); Shared with Benj Pasek and Justin Paul	Nominated	
Houston Film Critics Society	2007	Best Original Song	"Happy Working Song" (from Enchanted) (Note: Shared with Stephen Schwartz)	Nominated	
Houston Film Critics Society	2011	Best Original Song	"Star Spangled Man" (from Captain America: The First Avenger) (Note: Shared with David Zippel)	Nominated	
Houston Film Critics Society	2017	Best Original Song	"Evermore" (from Beauty and the Beast) (Note: Shared with Tim Rice)	Nominated	
International Film Music Critics Association	2006	Best Original Score for a Comedy Film	The Shaggy Dog	Nominated	
International Film Music Critics Association	2007	Best Original Score for a Comedy Film	Enchanted	Won	
International Film Music Critics Association	2010	Best Original Score for an Animated Feature	Tangled	Nominated	
Las Vegas Film Critics Society	2010	Best Song	"I See the Light" (from Tangled) (Note: Shared with Glenn Slater)	Won	
Las Vegas Film Critics Society	2016	Best Song	"The Great Beyond" (from Sausage Party) (Note: Shared with Glenn Slater, Seth Rogen, Evan Goldberg, Ariel Shaffir and Kyle Hunter)	Nominated	
Latino Entertainment Journalists Association	2019	Best Song	"Speechless" (from Aladdin) (Note: Shared with Benj Pasek and Justin Paul)	Nominated	
New York Drama Critics' Circle	1983	Best Musical	Little Shop of Horrors (Note: Shared with Howard Ashman)	Won	
Online Film & Television Association	1996	Best Score	The Hunchback of Notre Dame (Note: Shared with Stephen Schwartz)	Nominated	
Online Film & Television Association	1996	Best Original Song	"Someday" (from The Hunchback of Notre Dame) (Note: Shared with Stephen Schwartz)	Nominated	
Online Film & Television Association	1997	Best Comedy/Musical Score	Hercules (Note: Shared with David Zippel)	Nominated	
Online Film & Television Association	1997	Best Original Song	"Go the Distance" (from Hercules) (Note: Shared with David Zippel)	Nominated	
Online Film & Television Association	2003	Film Hall of Fame: Support (Music)	—N/a	Inducted	
Online Film & Television Association	2007	Best Original Song	"That's How You Know" (from Enchanted) (Note: Shared with Stephen Schwartz)	Nominated	
Online Film & Television Association	2010	Best Original Song	"I See the Light" (from Tangled) (Note: Shared with Glenn Slater)	Nominated	
Online Film & Television Association	2011	Best Original Song	"Star Spangled Man" (from Captain America: The First Avenger) (Note: Shared with David Zippel)	Nominated	
Online Film & Television Association	2017	Best Original Song	"Evermore" (from Beauty and the Beast) (Note: Shared with Tim Rice)	Nominated	
Online Film & Television Association	2017	Best Adapted Song	"Beauty and the Beast" (from Beauty and the Beast) (Note: Shared with Howard Ashman)	Nominated	
Online Film & Television Association	2017	Best Adapted Song	"Be Our Guest" (from Beauty and the Beast) (Note: Shared with Howard Ashman)	Runner-up	
Online Film & Television Association	2019	Best Adapted Song	"A Whole New World" (from Aladdin) (Note: Shared with Tim Rice)	Nominated	
Outer Critics Circle Awards	1983	Best Off-Broadway Musical	Little Shop of Horrors (Note: Shared with Howard Ashman)	Won	
Outer Critics Circle Awards	1983	Best Score	Little Shop of Horrors	Won	
Outer Critics Circle Awards	1994	Best Broadway Musical	Beauty and the Beast	Nominated	
Outer Critics Circle Awards	1995	Best Broadway Musical	A Christmas Carol	Nominated	
Outer Critics Circle Awards	2011	Outstanding New Broadway Musical	Sister Act	Nominated	
Outer Critics Circle Awards	2011	Outstanding New Score	Sister Act	Nominated	
Outer Critics Circle Awards	2012	Outstanding New Broadway Musical	Newsies	Nominated	
Outer Critics Circle Awards	2012	Outstanding New Score	Newsies	Won	
Outer Critics Circle Awards	2014	Outstanding New Broadway Musical	Aladdin	Nominated	
Outer Critics Circle Awards	2014	Outstanding New Score (The Marjorie Gunner Award)	Aladdin	Nominated	
Outer Critics Circle Awards	2017	Outstanding New Broadway Musical	A Bronx Tale; Shared with Glenn Slater	Nominated	
Outer Critics Circle Awards	2017	Outstanding New Score	A Bronx Tale; Shared with Glenn Slater	Nominated	
Phoenix Film Critics Society	2010	Best Original Song	"I've Got a Dream" (from Tangled) (Note: Shared with Glenn Slater)	Nominated	
Phoenix Film Critics Society	2011	Best Original Song	"Star Spangled Man" (from Captain America: The First Avenger) (Note: Shared with David Zippel)	Nominated	
Saturn Awards	1986	Best Music	Little Shop of Horrors	Won	
Saturn Awards	1992	Best Music	Aladdin	Nominated	
Saturn Awards	1992	Best Music	Beauty and the Beast	Nominated	
Saturn Awards	2007	Best Music	Enchanted	Won	
Saturn Awards	2019	Best Music	Aladdin	Nominated	
Saturn Awards	2024	Best Music	The Little Mermaid	Nominated	
Society of Composers & Lyricists	2019	Outstanding Original Song for Visual Media	"Speechless" (from Aladdin) (Note: Shared with Benj Pasek and Justin Paul)	Nominated	
St. Louis Gateway Film Critics Association	2007	Best Score	Enchanted (Note: Shared with Stephen Schwartz)	Nominated	
Webby Awards	2020	Websites and Mobile Sites Professional Services & Self-Promotion		Won	
World Soundtrack Awards	2011	Best Original Song Written for a Film	"I See the Light" (from Tangled); Shared with Glenn Slater	Nominated	

== Special honors ==
=== Disney Legends Awards ===
Year	Honor	Result	Ref.
2001	Disney Legends Awards	Inducted	

=== Hollywood Walk of Fame ===
Year	Honor	Result	Ref.
2010	Hollywood Walk of Fame	Inducted	

=== Songwriters Hall of Fame ===
Year	Honor	Result	Ref.
2008	Songwriters Hall of Fame	Inducted	

- 1993 – Distinguished Alumni Award (given by New York University Association)
- 1998 – Kol Zimrah Award (given by Hebrew Union College-Jewish Institute of Religion)
- 1998 – Colleen Dewhurst Awards: "in recognition for outstanding contribution to the arts" (given by Northern Westchester Center for the Arts)
- 2000 – Presidential Medal (given by New York University)
- 2008 – Inductee: NYU Musical Theatre Hall of Fame
- 2009 – Lifetime Achievement Award (given during the Musical Awards)
- 2011 – Maestro Award (given by Billboard/The Hollywood Reporter Film and TV Conference)
- 2012 – Honors: "for extraordinary life achievement" (given by Encompass New Opera Theatre)
- 2013 – The Oscar Hammerstein Award (given by York Theatre Company)
- 2013 – Broadway Junior Honors: "in recognition for his contribution towards the advancement of musical theatre for young people"
- 2013 – Freddie G. Award for Musical Achievement (given during Junior Theatre Festival)
