= Mother Knows Best (song) =

Song by Donna Murphy

from the album Tangled: Original Soundtrack
- Released: November 16, 2010
- Genre: Pop
- Length: 3:10
- Label: Walt Disney
- Composer: Alan Menken
- Lyricist: Glenn Slater
- Producer: Menken

"Mother Knows Best" is a song written by composer Alan Menken and lyricist Glenn Slater for Disney's animated film Tangled (2010). The songwriters wrote "Mother Knows Best" in the style of a classic Broadway musical number at the behest of the film's directors, Byron Howard and Nathan Greno, despite Menken's initial reservations that it would sound too different from Tangled's other songs. Released on November 16, 2010 as part of the film's soundtrack, "Mother Knows Best" was recorded by American actress Donna Murphy as Mother Gothel, the film's villain, and accompanies the character's efforts to frighten Rapunzel into remaining confined to their tower so she can continue exploiting her hair's healing powers.

"Mother Knows Best" is a musical theatre-inspired pop ballad with lyrics consisting of passive-aggressive insults; its upbeat melody masks its sinister themes about fearmongering, lying, manipulation, and child abuse. Later in the film, Gothel reprises "Mother Knows Best" in a more direct, vengeful manner when Rapunzel openly defies her for the first time. Musically, "Mother Knows Best" stands in contrast to the singer-songwriter style of Rapunzel's songs, which were performed by pop singer Mandy Moore. An accomplished Broadway performer, Murphy approached recording "Mother Knows Best" by envisioning Gothel as someone who thrives in the spotlight and relishes being the center of attention.

"Mother Knows Best" has received widespread acclaim from film and music critics, many of whom named it the film's best song. They also praised Murphy's performance, comparing it to actresses Patti LuPone and Julie Andrews. Additionally, the song has been compared to the work of Broadway composer and lyricist Stephen Sondheim, as well as Menken's previous work for Disney. In retrospect, several publications have ranked "Mother Knows Best" among Disney's greatest villain songs.

== Writing and recording ==
"Mother Knows Best" was written by composer Alan Menken and lyricist Glenn Slater. Menken and Slater wrote "Mother Knows Best" for Disney's animated film Tangled (2010) as a musical theater-inspired song at the behest of directors Byron Howard and Nathan Greno, who had specifically commissioned "a musical theatre moment" for the film's villain, Mother Gothel. Menken was initially concerned that its genre differed too greatly from the singer-songwriter style they had used to write the film's other songs, most of which were are performed by pop singer Mandy Moore. Before writing "Mother Knows Best", Menken and Slater selected appropriate moments during which the film's main characters could sing, and ultimately determined that "Mother Knows Best" "flows directly out of the conflict between" Gothel and Rapunzel. He realized that it was unusual for the film's "mother" character to also be performing its villain song, occupying both roles simultaneously.

Menken found "Mother Knows Best" challenging to write due to the subtlety required to not reveal the true nature of Gothel and Rapunzel's complex relationship. The composer explained that, in addition to establishing that the characters care for each other to a certain extent, the song was also tasked with delicately addressing the serious subject of emotional abuse in a manner appropriate for a Disney film. Furthermore, Menken observed both parallels and stark differences between Gothel and Claude Frollo from The Hunchback of Notre Dame (1996), another Disney villain he had written songs for, who also has an unhealthy relationship with his non-biological child. One of the song's lines, "getting kind of chubby", was borrowed from a real conversation the directors had with several female employees about their complicated relationships with their own mothers. Ultimately, Menken was pleased with "Mother Knows Best".

"Mother Knows Best" was recorded by actress and singer Donna Murphy. Primarily a stage performer, Murphy had never voiced an animated character prior to spontaneously auditioning for Tangled. Because the film is a musical, all auditionees were asked to perform a song of their choice in the style of their desired character, and Murphy opted to sing "Children Will Listen" from the stage musical Into the Woods. (Note: The stage musical "Into the Woods" is a fractured fairy tale that also features a version of the Mother Gothel character, a role Murphy herself would play in 2012.) Because of the actress' extensive musical theatre experience, Menken and the directors welcomed her suggestions about Gothel's music, on one occasion suggesting an alternate arrangement of "Mother Knows Best". Murphy envisioned her character as an entertainer who "envisions herself periodically being hit with a spotlight", which ultimately informed her performance on "Mother Knows Best". Recording the song helped her understand her character's true wickedness. After hearing "Mother Knows Best" for the first time, animator Jin Kim imagined a "1940s Hollywood screen siren motif" for Gothel's appearance and personality, whereas Menken likened her to a nightclub singer.

== Context and use in Tangled ==
Sung during the first act, "Mother Knows Best" occurs within the first fifteen minutes of Tangled. On the eve of her eighteenth birthday, Rapunzel finally musters the courage to ask Gothel's permission to see the mysterious floating lanterns in person. Gothel, whose eternal youth and beauty relies on the preservation of Rapunzel's magical hair, warns her ward that beyond the tower is rife with selfish people who wish to steal and take advantage of her hair. Gothel insists her refusal is for Rapunzel's own protection. "Mother Knows Best" is Gothel's attempt to rationalize keeping Rapunzel imprisoned indefinitely, going to great lengths to convince her that she is better off staying home by reminding her that "mother knows best". Gothel simultaneously lists multiple reasons Rapunzel could never survive without her, while telling her how much she cares. She manipulates Rapunzel into remaining home by scaring and guilt tripping her. Rapunzel believes Gothel has the best intentions despite audiences fully knowing that she is only being used for Gothel's personal benefit. Despite being a villain song, Gothel desperately tries to disguise her villainy. Softonic.com wrote that at first the song might not sound like it is being performed by the film's villain, who seemingly "apparently worried about the dangers of the outside world – all she wants to do is protect her daughter". A writer for Disney.com observed, "The creepiness of this song lies in the fact that the very untrustworthy Mother Gothel is positioning herself as a helpful figure to Rapunzel".

By the end of the musical number, Gothel actually contradicts herself by forbidding Rapunzel from asking to leave their tower ever again. According to Amid Amidi of Cartoon Brew, the scene alternates between funny and scary, identifying Gothel's "theatrical gestures" and "claustrophobia-inducing stark black backgrounds" as examples of each. Moviefone's William Goss cited the musical number as an example of "fear-mongering". According to Jennie Punter of The Globe and Mail, the sequence "hilariously convey[s] the fear and guilt that have kept Rapunzel in the tower of her own free will". In the book Marvels & Tales (2012), author Kendra Magnusson observed that, during "Mother Knows Best", "the manipulation of Rapunzel's hair leaves the heroine's body wrenched in one moment and bound up in it the next", demonstrating that, while Rapunzel can use her hair to defend herself, "it is simultaneously a liability" that can just as well be used to harm her.

Critics have analyzed the scene's implications regarding abusive relationships. In the book How Fairy Tales Live Happily Ever After: (Analyzing) the Art of Adapting Fairy Tales (2014), author Conny Eisfeld observed that "Mother Knows Best" emphasizes the irony of Gothel's superiority over Rapunzel, in spite of the fact that "her existence solely depend[s] on Rapunzel". A writer for Bitch felt that "Mother Knows Best" is Gothel's strongest demonstration of abusive mothering from the entire film, with Charlie Ridgley of ComicBook.com writing that the scene establishes "just how little she actually cares for Rapunzel". Some critics have often identified the sequence as one of the film's darkest and edgiest moments, about which Consequence said it shows "how damaging and debilitating emotional manipulation can be, particularly from those who (pretend to) love us". Glen Chapman of Den of Geek wrote that the scene "strikes a balance between melodic and narrative sophistication, as well as being equal parts sweet and sinister". Gothel later reprises the song in manner which, according to Barry Levitt of /Film, finally allows Rapunzel "to see just how cruel and manipulative her captor-mother can be".

== Music and lyrics ==
According to the song's official sheet music, "Mother Knows Best" is performed "with rubato" in the key of F major at a moderate tempo of 66 beats per minute. Critics have described the song as a "brash", Broadway-style ballad. Lasting three minutes and ten seconds in duration, "Mother Knows Best" is the second-longest track the soundtrack, behind the Mandy Moore-Zachary Levi duet "I See the Light". According to Tom Charity of CNN, it is a "grand, theatrical number", in which some reviewers identified jazz, pop, and operetta influences. Michael Smith of the Tulsa World referred to the song as "a bouncy little Freudian nightmare", and Variety's Justin Chang dubbed it an "authoritarian anthem". According to Anthony Quinn of The Independent, "Mother Knows Best" is a "creepy-funny ode to self-interest", whereas Joe Williams of the St. Louis Post-Dispatch described its musical undertones as "mercenary". A writer for Filmtracks.com observed that its "lovely romantic melody and instrumentation is betrayed by its absolutely evil lyrics". Similarly, Softonic.com felt that "never before has such a sweet tune hidden so much evil".

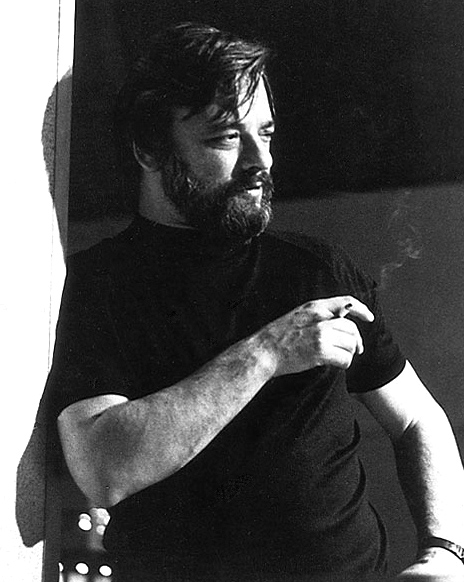
Music critics likened "Mother Knows Best" to the work of Broadway composer Stephen Sondheim.

Featuring dark, humorous lyrics, "Mother Knows Best" is about overprotecting someone to hide the truth from and maintain control over them, with a mother claiming to know what her child deserves. "Mother Knows Best" stands apart from Tangled's more empowering, adventurous songs. Io9 contributor Meredith Goerner described the ballad as a "twisted song about" a mother "sheltering her fake daughter from the real world so she can live forever". The song's lyrics name several factors Gothel claims are dangers to Rapunzel, such as ruffians, thugs, poison ivy, quicksand, cannibals, snakes, and the plague, to deter her from leaving their secluded tower. Using passive-aggressive insults, the song opens with Murphy speaking, "You want to go outside? Why, Rapunzel!", and features the line "skip the drama, stay with mama". Barry Levitt of Time said Menken's "soft and soothing" melody deliberately contradicts Slater's lyrics, which he described as "a powerful expression of toxic and unbalanced relationships". Josh Lezmi, a writer for Thought Catalog, said the song appears to be "filled with advice and guidance, yet the lyrics mask Mother Gothel's desire to keep her daughter isolated" from the world. Writing for Slant Magazine, Christian Blauvelt found its lyrics similar to "Out There" from Disney's The Hunchback of Notre Dame (1996), specifically Claude Frollo's verse; both songs were composed by Menken. AllMusic's James Christopher Monger also compared "Mother Knows Best" to Menken's earlier work for Disney, saying it is "cut from the same pop cloth as all of the late 20th/early 21st century Disney offerings".

Murphy's vocal range on the song spans approximately two octaves, from F_{3} to C_{5}. She uses a Transatlantic accent throughout the track, which according to musicologist Robert Komaniecki makes her character sound like a time capsule. Proma Khosla of Mashable likened her performance to "a true Broadway diva going in for the kill". Playbill's Ruthie Fierberg felt Murphy discovered "new ways to use her belt and her delicate coloratura". For Little White Lies, Georgie Hobbs said the actress "performs ... with a schizophrenic frenzy" and likened "Mother Knows Best" to the work of Broadway songwriter Stephen Sondheim. Dan Kois of The Village Voice compared her work to Sondheim's musical Gypsy, while Norman Wilner of Now was reminded of Broadway actress Patti LuPone, which according to Marjorie Baumgarten of The Austin Chronicle "drip[s] with sarcasm and biting wit". Meanwhile, Tim Robey of The Daily Telegraph likened Murphy's performance to actress and singer Julie Andrews, describing it as "Julie-Andrews-on-stimulants".

According to Bitch, the song's reprise "features far darker harmonies and a slightly revised melody as compared to the original rendition of the song".

== Reception ==
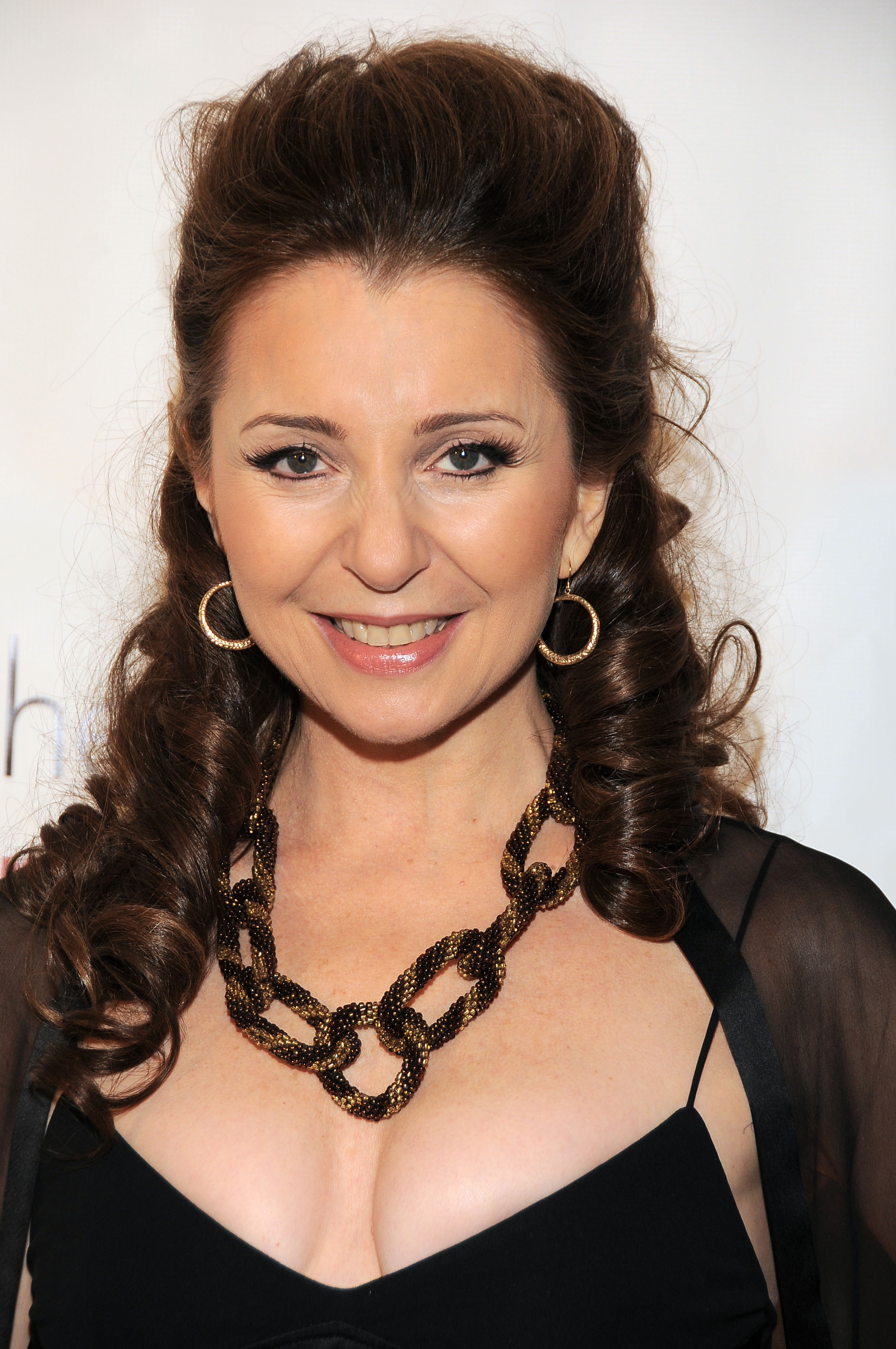
Critics praised Donna Murphy's vocal performance.

"Mother Knows Best" has received widespread acclaim from film and music critics, many of whom praised the song despite expressing ambivalence towards most of Tangled's musical numbers. Den of Geek's Glen Chapman called it the film's "finest track" that "strikes a balance between melodic and narrative sophistication, as well as being equal parts sweet and sinister". Michael Smith, writing for the Tulsa World, felt the song's darkness imbues Tangled with "a bitter balance for the sugar and spice" by recalling "the nasty bits of the original Grimm's fairy tale". Mal Vincent of The Virginian-Pilot called it "a good villain entry". Critics have unanimously named "Mother Knows Best" the film's best song, some of whom declared it worthy of some of Sondheim's heroines, specifically Mama Rose from Gypsy (1959). Steve Persall of the Tampa Bay Times called "Mother Knows Best" "a knockout" and "potential Broadway showstopper". According to an article by William Bibbiani of Mandatory in 2017, "Mother Knows Best" remains one of Menken's richest, most subversive Disney compositions. Calling the track "terrifically catchy", Barry Levitt of /Film described "Mother Knows Best" as "a masterclass in manipulation and passive-aggressiveness". IndieWire said at least one-third of the film's greatness is owed to "Mother Knows Best".

Murphy's vocals were also well-received, which critics likened to performances by Patti LuPone and Julia Andrews. Lindsey Ward of Canoe.ca said "Murphy alone turns [the song] into a giant spectacle with her voice". Rolling Stone film critic Peter Travers called her performance "comic bliss with a sting in its tail". 7x7's Rossiter Drake called her efforts "a welcome revelation", while The Austin Chronicle's Marjorie Baumgarten praised her showmanship. Tom Charity of CNN commended the actress for treating the musical number like "the showstopper it deserves to be", and Linda Cook of the Quad-City Times concluded that she "makes the purchase of the soundtrack worthwhile". Christian Blauvelt of Slant Magazine wrote, "If a couple of Menken's songs feel less than soaring, it's due only to the limited pop-star vocals of Mandy Moore", but "when Broadway vet Murphy takes to scaling Menken's octave-climbing melodies like a vocal escalator, it's a different story". Sandie Angulo Chen of Common Sense Media said her vocals are "on fabulous display in the amazing number", and William Goss of Moviefone said she belts it "perfectly".

In a mixed review, Wesley Morris of The Boston Globe enjoyed the quality of the song but found it unnecessary and melodramatic. James Berardinelli of ReelViews gave it a negative review, feeling that it was equally as unmemorable as the other tracks and writing, "It's hard to imagine someone humming ... 'Mother Knows Best' when leaving the theater".

== Live performances and use in media ==
In 2021, actress Melora Hardin and professional dance partner Artem Chigvintsev performed a jazz routine to Hardin's cover of "Mother Knows Best" on the reality television dance competition Dancing with the Stars. Hardin's performance received unanimous praise from the judges, earning the highest score of the "Disney Villains"-themed portion of the episode, as well as the season's first 10.

== Legacy ==
In the years since the song was released, several publications have ranked "Mother Knows Best" in their assessments of songs performed by Disney villains. Thought Catalog and Screen Rant ranked it the third-best Disney villain song. TVOvermind and Mashable ranked "Mother Knows Best" Disney's fifth best villain song. Ranking the song seventh, ComicBook.com's Charlie Ridgely believes "the intention behind the lyrics are what really set it apart as one of the great Disney villain numbers". Hillary Busis of Entertainment Weekly ranked "Mother Knows Best" Disney's ninth-best villain song, opining that Gothel "can't elevate it higher than the middle of the pack" despite her "admirable swagger". Io9 ranked the song 11th on the website's list of "The 36 Greatest Supervillain Musical Numbers of All Time". Barry Levitt of Time placed "Mother Knows Best" 37th on the website's 2024 "50 Best Disney Songs" ranking. On their "Definitive Ranking" of 295 Disney songs, Consequence ranked "Mother Knows Best" 112th. Backstage selected it as one of the top musical theatre audition songs for female singers. In 2011, GamesRadar+ named the scene one of Disney's 50 greatest film moments.

In 2024, University of British Columbia musicology professor Robert Komaniecki used a "rigorous methodology" to rank Disney songs released up to that point. He evaluated factors such as lyrics, music, vocals, plot integration, and "subjective enjoyment", sharing his rankings on X in groups of five. By the end of his research, Komaniecki ranked "Mother Knows Best" as the best Disney song from a final list of 114. His list received widespread media coverage, and "Mother Knows Best" was deemed a controversial winner over popular contenders such as "When You Wish Upon a Star", "Beauty and the Beast", and "Part of Your World". Komaniecki defended his choice, citing the song's resemblance to contemporary musical theatre, its role in plot progression, strong bridge, and his commitment to his ranking criteria. He also praised the song's orchestration, composition, and lyrics. Slater contacted Komaniecki to express how much he had enjoyed the ranking.

"Mother Knows Best" inspired the title of the novel Mother Knows Best: A Tale of the Old Witch (2018) by author Serena Valentino, which reimagines Gothel's origin story.

== Certifications ==
Certifications for "Mother Knows Best"
Region	Certification	Certified units/sales
United Kingdom (BPI)	Silver	200,000^{‡}
United States (RIAA)	Platinum	1,000,000^{‡}
^{‡} Sales+streaming figures based on certification alone.
