= When Will My Life Begin? =

2010 song from Disney's Tangled

Song by Mandy Moore

from the album Tangled
- Published: Wonderland; Walt Disney Music Company
- Released: November 16, 2010
- Recorded: 2010
- Genre: Show tune
- Length: 2:32
- Label: Walt Disney
- Composer: Alan Menken
- Lyricist: Glenn Slater
- Producers: Scott Cutler; Anne Preven; Alan Menken

"When Will My Life Begin?" is a song from Disney's 2010 animated feature film, Tangled. It is sung by American actress Mandy Moore in her vocal role of Princess Rapunzel and serves as the "I Want" song of the film. It is reprised later on once she is allowed out of the tower for the first time. A short reprise with Rapunzel reiterating her situation, and reasoning that "I've got my mother's love...I have everything" etc., was cut from the final film, though was included in the soundtrack. Lyrics are by Glenn Slater, and music is by Alan Menken.

== Production ==
"When Will My Life Begin?" was the first song that was written for the movie. Alan Menken explained how he devised the song within the constraints of the chosen genre (guitar-themed score): "When I thought about Rapunzel in the tower and her long hair, on a gut level, and I thought of the folk music of the 1960s—Jackson Browne, Joni Mitchell—and, it wasn't an immediate yes, but I wrote six different versions of that opening number ["When Will My Life Begin" performed by Mandy Moore as Rapunzel] and it worked". Menken noted that in the context of the musical film's structure and to move the plot forward "In Tangled, we had to have to have Rapunzel start with [the premise that] 'everything's great here [in the tower]' and end with: 'when will my life begin?'".

When asked by DenofGeek about the "over-arching [musical] theme of the film", Menken responded:

In the case of Tangled, it was a B-section of When Will My Life Begin, the theme that I use. [at which point Mr Menken starts singing the theme out loud] That really was not the major part of any song, because I couldn't use [he sings another bit here].I just go, "What can I use? what can I use? Oh, I'll use that!"

The film's Blu-ray disc features "extended versions of the songs 'When Will My Life Begin?' and 'Mother Knows Best', with animatic renderings of the unfinished animation". The main version originally had a prologue in which Rapunzel sings about how she had spent 6000 hours of her life locked up in a monotonous life, and how her 18th birthday is 24 hours away. Bennets Reviews wrote "Interestingly, the first reprise of "When Will My Life Begin" does not appear in the film, though the second reprise does".

== Synopsis ==
The film's "opening tune" is about how Rapunzel accomplishes many things throughout her day, but what she really wants is adventure and to be outside her tower. Spirituality & Practice explains "For her entire life, Rapunzel has been dreaming about venturing out of the tower to see up-close-and-personal the floating lights in the sky that appear every year on her birthday. But to do so, she would have to step into the dangerous unknown world".

== Composition ==
The song's tempo is "moderately fast", and the genre is "rock". Collider explains: "Joni Mitchell is an influence on When Will My Life Begin?, and the barebones use of guitar provides a different feel. One can easily see the parallels that Menken and the directors went for in blending old with new, and there is an interesting result. Mother Gothel's songs feel as ancient as she is, while Rapunzel's songs have a truly youthful exuberance and feel." Alan Menken acknowledges that he was "painfully aware" of thematic similarities between this song and Quasimodo's "I Want" song "Out There" from The Hunchback of Notre Dame (1996) during the writing process, and "wanted to make sure we avoided them". He elaborated further however, explaining "But there is a difference. Quasimodo looks out [from the church bell tower] and knows he wants to be out there in the world—but Rapunzel is not so sure; she's afraid. We have to want it for her. So, it was a challenge. There's also a very different energy in Tangled".

== Analysis ==
The One Year Father-Daughter Devotions noted that "In the midst of her daily routine, [Rapunzel] sings a catchy song in which she wonders repeatedly, "When will my life begin?" What she's really asking is, When will I be making my own decisions and having my own new adventures in life?". Thematically, the song harks back to similar songs in Disney's history. From Snow White to Tangled: Gender and Genre Fiction in Disney's "Princess" Animations notes the song is "very similar to Snow Whites' first song 'I'm wishing'". The academic paper From Rapunzel to Tangled and beyond: Multimedia practices in the language and literature classroom explains that at the very beginning of the movie when this song is sung, "first Rapunzel is a maid". It explains that in this scene, "Rapunzel wants to go out the day of the birthday and her mother wants her to stay inside". Comparing the song to the "1920s jazz age-style" Almost There from Princess and the Frog, Home Sweat Home: Perspectives on Housework and Modern Relationships says the song "similarly elevates domestic routine to the level of the operatic", describing Rapunzel as "enslaved".

== Critical reception ==
FilmTracks wrote, "Rapunzel's 'When Will My Life Begin?', representing the soundtrack's best mainstream appeal and the most likely candidate for awards consideration, is a Broadway-style rock song (Andrew Lloyd Webber's Evita is emulated in some of the progressions) with acoustic guitar, Hammond organ, and aggressive percussion. Mandy Moore's performance in the lead is passable but a little too rough around the edges to put the stamp of approval upon her for this role. A princess' voice is typically prettier and better enunciated in spoken portions, so Moore may bother some listeners. This applies especially to the two reprises of 'When Will My Life Begin?', both of which orchestral and requiring better performance range in the merging of spoken and sung lyrics than Moore seems comfortable providing." Allmusic wrote ""When Will My Life Begin" and "Every Girl Can Be a Princess" are lush, wittily written songs typical of latter-day Disney films".

CommonSenseMedia describes it as "eternally optimistic". Pajiba writes "The only song that doesn't feel lifted [from an earlier Disney film] is Rapunzel's "When Will My Life Begin?", and that's because the guitar and rhythm instantly date it as a circa 2010 pop song performed by Mandy Moore. GaryWrightOnline named the song "rather forgettable". Vulture said "Early on, Rapunzel sings a ditty called 'When Will My Life Begin?' that recounts how she spends her days and nights, and though it's awfully sprightly for a lifelong shut-in, Moore has a supple voice, the staging is amusing, and the tune (by Alan Menken) is catchy." Spirituality & Practice notes the song expresses the "teenager's frustration". Bennets Reviews wrote "The album opens with "When Will my Life Begin" which also acts as Repunzel's theme. The song is a mix of orchestra and contemporary elements that actually blend together well. Mandy Moore's vocals may not be as strong as some of the vocals from other Menken scored films, but they still work fine in this instance". The site added that "I See the Light returns to the classic/contemporary blend heard in "When Will My Life Begin", though this time in a lovely romantic setting".

== Cover version ==
Female members of SM Entertainment's pre-debut trainees team SM Rookies Koeun, Hina, Herin, and Lami covered the song in the Disney Channel Korea show Mickey Mouse Club in 2015.

== Certifications ==
Region	Certification	Certified units/sales
New Zealand (RMNZ)	Platinum	30,000^{‡}
United Kingdom (BPI)	Platinum	600,000^{‡}
United States (RIAA)	3× Platinum	3,000,000^{‡}
^{‡} Sales+streaming figures based on certification alone.
