= I've Got a Dream =

Song by Brad Garrett, Jeffrey Tambor, Mandy Moore, and Zachary Levi

from the album Tangled
- Published: Wonderland / Walt Disney Music Company
- Released: November 16, 2010
- Recorded: 2010
- Genre: Show tune
- Length: 3:11
- Label: Walt Disney
- Composer: Alan Menken
- Lyricist: Glenn Slater
- Producer: Alan Menken

"I've Got a Dream" is a song written by composer Alan Menken and lyricist Glenn Slater from Disney's 2010 animated feature film, Tangled. It is performed by Brad Garrett, Jeffrey Tambor, Mandy Moore and Zachary Levi.

== Synopsis ==
I've Got a Dream is performed by the threatening and masculine patrons at a seedy pub known as "The Snuggly Duckling" who initially intimidate Rapunzel and Flynn Rider after recognizing Flynn as a wanted fugitive, however the patrons, led by Hook Hand, eventually subvert expectations by revealing their dreams and passions to Rapunzel, who, in turn, reveals her dream of watching the floating lanterns in person. This endears her to them, and as royal guards arrive, the patrons help Rapunzel and Flynn escape the pub through a secret passage.

== Critical reception ==
ComingSoon said the song was "memorable for the silly barbarians". In regard to the lyrics quality of the song, for example "rhym[ing] 'femurs' and 'dreamers' and has a line that goes, 'I've got scars and lumps and bruises/plus something here that oozes'", Vulture commented: "Very nice". On the men's desires, BitchFlicks wrote "Even tough guys have nuance and feminine qualities!". The Independent Critic deemed it "very Enchanted like" The Dive Review said "If Tangled's laughs resemble anything, it's probably closest to the absurd, surreal comedy of Monty Python's Flying Circus, particularly moments like the big "I've Got a Dream" production number". TheScoreCard wrote ""I've got a dream" is the only song I will be able to remember. I appreciate it even if it's grammatically incorrect. It's fast and fun. It reminds me of "Gaston" from Beauty and the Beast". The site also said it was the best scene. WeAreMovieGeeks wrote "Luckily "I've Got a Dream" is livened up by some great animation of the forest thugs. I found it distracting that these medieval folks were using modern phrases like "downer" and "freak-out". Perhaps I'm nitpicking too much." FilmTracks wrote " At least there's no yodeling in "I've Got a Dream" (behold Home on the Range for that pleasure), and Moore's contribution actually works well when mixed with all the colorful secondary voices."

== Certifications ==
Region	Certification	Certified units/sales
New Zealand (RMNZ)	Gold	15,000^{‡}
United Kingdom (BPI)	Silver	200,000^{‡}
United States (RIAA)	Platinum	1,000,000^{‡}
^{‡} Sales+streaming figures based on certification alone.
