= Mirror Mirror (soundtrack) =

Mirror Mirror: Original Motion Picture Soundtrack

Film score by Alan Menken
- Released: April 2, 2012
- Studio: Bastyr University Chapel (Kenmore, Washington, United States)
- Genre: Classical; orchestral
- Length: 56:14
- Label: Relativity Music Group; Sony Classical
- Producer: Kevin Kliesch

Alan Menken chronology
Tangled (2010)	Mirror Mirror (2012)	Sausage Party (2016)

Professional ratings
Review scores
Source	Rating
AllMusic	3/5 stars
Filmtracks	3.71/5 stars

Mirror Mirror: Original Motion Picture Soundtrack is the score album to Relativity Media's 2012 film of the same name with 15 score pieces composed by Alan Menken. The soundtrack includes two versions of the song "I Believe In Love", performed by Lily Collins.

== Background ==
=== I Believe In Love ===
The song "I Believe In Love" was originally written in 1970 by Nina Hart, a singer-song writer and stage and TV actress (then working at New York City music-publishing company, Golden Bough Productions). The song was one of several written by Hart for director Miloš Forman to consider for his film Taking Off. She performed the song in Forman's film, playing a character at an audition; Hart's recording was a hit in Italy and was later covered by Iranian singer Googoosh. Tarsem Singh—who was unaware that it had previously been used in a film—chose the song for the Bollywood-style musical finale of Mirror Mirror because his daughter had enjoyed the song when he had played it for her the previous year.

== Track listing ==
All music is composed by Alan Menken, except where noted.

Mirror Mirror: Original Motion Picture Soundtrack
No.	Title	Length
1.	"Opening"	3:43
2.	"Snow White And The Kingdom"	3:09
3.	"Love At First Sight"	2:16
4.	"Beauty Treatment"	1:10
5.	"The Ball"	2:26
6.	"The Queen Wants Snow Killed"	2:51
7.	"The Dwarves"	2:41
8.	"Seduction"	1:52
9.	"The Training"	2:15
10.	"Dueling"	4:46
11.	"Love Potion"	3:25
12.	"Mannequin Attack"	3:23
13.	"Breaking The Spell"	4:11
14.	"Beast"	6:44
15.	"Happy End"	5:51
16.	"I Believe In Love (Mirror Mirror Mix)" (Lily Collins)	2:43
17.	"I Believe In Love (Evil Queen Mix)" (Lily Collins)	2:58
Total length:		56:14

== Personnel ==
Credits adapted from CD liner notes:

- Art Direction, Design – Jordan Butcher
- Conductor (Choir) – Michael Kosarin
- Contractor – David Sabee
- Coordinator (Music For Relativity Media Group) – Ian Broucek
- Coordinator (Score) – Deborah Streeter, Rick Kunis (2)
- Engineer (Monitor), Stage Manager – Jon Schluckebier
- Engineer (Pro Tools), Recorded By (Recordist) – Kevin Globerman
- Engineer (Seattlemusic Staff) – Brian Valentino, Kory Kruckenberg
- Executive-Producer (Soundtrack) – Bob Bowen, Brett Ratner, Happy Walters, Jason Markey, Ryan Kavanaugh
- Liner Notes – Alan Menken
- Management (Executive In Charge Of Music For Relativity Media) – Bob Bowen
- Management (Executive In Charge Of Soundtracks For Relativity Media Group) – Jason Markey
- Mastered By – Patricia Sullivan
- Music By – Alan Menken
- Performer – The Northwest Sinfonia
- Producer (Score) – Kevin Kliesch
- Recorded By, Mixed By – Frank Wolf
- Score Editor – Lee Scott (3)
- Score Editor (Supervising) – Katrina Schiller
- Technician (Stage Techs) – John Winters (4), Paul Herlihy
