= Tangled (soundtrack) =

2010 soundtrack album by Various artists

Soundtrack album by Various Artists
- Released: November 16, 2010
- Recorded: 2007–2010
- Studios: Eastwood Scoring Stage, Warner Bros. Studios
- Genres: Folk rock; medieval
- Length: 55:39
- Label: Walt Disney
- Producers: Chris Montan; Alan Menken; Scott Cutler; Anne Preven; Frank Wolf; Grace Potter; Mike Daly; Kevin Kliesch

Alan Menken chronology
| Enchanted (2007) | Tangled (2010) | Mirror Mirror (2012) |

Tangled is the soundtrack album to the 2010 animated film Tangled produced by Walt Disney Animation Studios. The film's original score and songs were composed by Alan Menken, which marked his return to composition for an animated feature, as he previously worked on several of Disney's animated features till Home on the Range (2004). (Note: Though Menken had composed for the 2007 film Enchanted, it is a live-action-animation film, hence it cannot be considered as a full-fledged animation feature.) The original songs were created by blending medieval music with 1960s folk rock. Glenn Slater wrote lyrics for most of the tracks in the album, except for the closing credits song, "Something That I Want", which was written, composed and performed by Grace Potter from Grace Potter and the Nocturnals, with the score orchestrated by Kevin Kliesch and conducted by Menken's longtime collaborator Michael Kosarin.

The soundtrack was released by Walt Disney Records on November 16, 2010, followed by a vinyl edition that was released on March 21, 2014. Apart from being critically acclaimed, the soundtrack received several awards and nominations, including the Grammy Award for Best Song Written for Visual Media for the track "I See the Light". Menken and Slater wrote three new songs for the series, apart from reusing the original tracks for the stage adaptation Tangled: The Musical.

== Reception ==
Professional ratings
Review scores
| Source | Rating |
|---|---|
| Filmtracks | 4/5 stars |

The soundtrack (particularly Menken's musical score) in general was technically praised, however the songs mostly received some mixed reactions for being too derivative to many of Menken's previous works (particularly the 1990s renaissance ones). Bill Graham from Collider praised them for their variations to the tempo and tone, memorable lyrics, and "blending old with new," However, he also stated that "the film's constant mixture of tones can feel a bit off-putting for some." Roth Cornet from Screen Rant was positive towards them, saying that "Alan Menken's music is as catchy, uplifting and effecting as one would expect." Scott of The New York Times positively reviewed the music, saying that it "takes you back to a charmed world of swoony longing and sprightly mischief," with a slick and efficient atmosphere and grace notes of self-conscious classicism. Corliss from Time was also positive to the songs, noting that though "don't sound on first hearing like top-drawer Menken," the songs still "smoothly fill their functions." He described the opener, "When Will My Life Begin?," as the "heroine's 'I wanna' song," a Disney tradition that stretches back to Snow White's "Some Day My Prince Will Come." "I See the Light" was described as "a generically tuneful love ballad, which is sure to be nominated for a Best Song Oscar."

James Berardinelli, on the other hand, negatively commented the songs as "neither catchy nor memorable." Tim Robey from The Daily Telegraph gave a negative review, saying that they were only "OK—there's nothing you want to whistle on the way home." Peter Bradshaw from The Guardian, who gave the movie two out of five stars, described the songs as "sporting a laboured selection of Broadway-style show tunes," and hence are actually added for profit.

== Track listing ==
Tangled (Original Motion Picture Soundtrack) track listing
| No. | Title | Performers | Length |
|---|---|---|---|
| 1. | "When Will My Life Begin?" | Mandy Moore | 2:32 |
| 2. | "When Will My Life Begin? (Note: Not featured in film.)" (Reprise 1) | Moore | 1:03 |
| 3. | "Mother Knows Best (Note: This is an extended version of the song.)" | Donna Murphy | 3:10 |
| 4. | "When Will My Life Begin?" (Reprise 2) | Moore | 2:06 |
| 5. | "I've Got a Dream" | Brad Garrett; Jeffrey Tambor; Moore; Zachary Levi; Tangled ensemble | 3:11 |
| 6. | "Mother Knows Best" (Reprise) | Murphy | 1:38 |
| 7. | "I See the Light" | Moore; Levi | 3:44 |
| 8. | "Healing Incantation" | Moore | 0:54 |
| 9. | "Flynn Wanted" (Score) | Alan Menken | 2:51 |
| 10. | "Prologue" (Score and song) | Menken; Murphy; Delaney Rose Stein | 2:02 |
| 11. | "Horse with No Rider" (Score) | Menken | 1:57 |
| 12. | "Escape Route" (Score) | Menken | 1:57 |
| 13. | "Campfire" (Score) | Menken | 3:21 |
| 14. | "Kingdom Dance" (Score) | Menken | 2:20 |
| 15. | "Waiting For the Lights" (Score) | Menken | 2:47 |
| 16. | "Return to Mother" (Score) | Menken | 2:06 |
| 17. | "Realization and Escape" (Score) | Menken | 5:50 |
| 18. | "The Tear Heals" (Score and song) | Menken; Moore | 7:37 |
| 19. | "Kingdom Celebration" (Score) | Menken | 1:50 |
| 20. | "Something That I Want" | Grace Potter | 2:43 |
| 21. | "I See The Light" (Reprise) | Shannon Saunders | 3:38 |

== Charts ==
=== Weekly charts ===
| Chart (2010) | Peak position |
|---|---|
| |US Billboard 200 | 44 |
| US Billboard Soundtracks | 7 |
| US Billboard Kids Albums | 3 |

=== Year-end charts ===
| Chart (2022) | Position |
|---|---|
| US Soundtrack Albums (Billboard) | 17 |
| Chart (2023) | Position |
| US Soundtrack Albums (Billboard) | 19 |
| Chart (2024) | Position |
| US Soundtrack Albums (Billboard) | 19 |
| Chart (2025) | Position |
| US Soundtrack Albums (Billboard) | 19 |

== Certifications ==
| Region | Certification | Certified units/sales |
|---|---|---|
| United Kingdom (BPI) | Gold | 100,000^{‡} |
| United States (RIAA) | Platinum | 1,000,000^{‡} |
^{‡} Sales+streaming figures based on certification alone.

== Accolades ==
| Award (Note: Awards, festivals and organizations are in alphabetical order.) | Date of ceremony (Note: Date is linked to the article about the awards held that year, wherever possible.) | Category | Recipient(s) and nominee(s) | Result | Ref. |
|---|---|---|---|---|---|
| Academy Awards | February 27, 2011 | Best Original Song | "I See the Light" – Mandy Moore and Zachary Levi | Nominated | |
| Critics' Choice Movie Awards | January 14, 2011 | Best Song | "I See the Light" – Mandy Moore and Zachary Levi | Nominated | |
| Golden Globe Awards | January 16, 2011 | Best Original Song | "I See the Light" – Mandy Moore and Zachary Levi | Nominated | |
| Golden Reel Awards | April 15, 2011 | Best Sound Editing: Music in a Musical Feature Film | Tom MacDougall | Nominated | |
| Grammy Awards | February 12, 2012 | Best Compilation Soundtrack for Visual Media | Tangled (Original Motion Picture Soundtrack) | Nominated | |
| Grammy Awards | February 12, 2012 | Best Song Written For Visual Media | "I See the Light" – Mandy Moore and Zachary Levi | Won | |
| Las Vegas Film Critics Society | December 16, 2010 | Best Song | "I See the Light" – Mandy Moore and Zachary Levi | Won | |
| Phoenix Film Critics Society Awards | December 29, 2010 | Best Original Song | "I've Got a Dream" – Brad Garrett, Jeffrey Tambor, Mandy Moore, Zachary Levi and the Tangled Ensemble | Nominated | |
