= Dear Worthy Editor =

- Cover art of the original "pre-Broadway" concert staging of Dear Worthy Editor
- Music: Alan Menken
- Lyrics: Alan Menken
- Book: Judy Menken
- Setting: American, early 1900s
- Basis: Bintel Brief column from Jewish Daily Forward
- Premiere: c. 1974: New Rochelle, New York

Dear Worthy Editor: Letters to The Daily Forward (originally called A Bintel Brief) is a 1960s or c. 1974 musical and one of the early works by Alan Menken. He collaborated with his mother to develop the musical, adapted from the Bintel Brief letters-to-the-editor published by the Yiddish-language newspaper Jewish Daily Forward. While Menken had written musicals prior to this, it became his first work to achieve a level of success, being performed many times in the Jewish-American circuit.

== History ==
=== Background ===
The show was one of Alan Menken's first, written during his time at BMI, along with For Madmen Only (based on the novel Steppenwolf), Conversations With Pierre (inspired by therapy sessions with menken's psychiatrist), and Murder at the Circus (a musical based around a single song). Menken was able to audition for the workshop through a mutual composer friend of his parents' named Don Frieberg. Lehman Engel immediately said he was in the workshop, which was unusual for the man. Engel ran classes at the BMI Musical Theatre Workshop which aimed to evaluate the works of would-be composers. In these sessions, works would be played and sung, then critiqued by both the moderator and the students.

=== Development ===
Dear Worthy Editor, written around 1974, was based on letters to the editor sent to the Jewish Daily Forward, an American newspaper originally written in Yiddish and targeted to a Jewish-American audience. Menken was talked into writing the musical by his mother Judy Menken. She was active in New Rochelle's Mercury Players (a.k.a. Vignette Players) community group as a writer, performer and director. At this point, she was still living in New Rochelle, New York, while Alan had moved to Manhattan. At the time, Alan needed money for college so they decided to put on a show to raise funds. Judy wrote the book while Alan composed the music and lyrics. The musical was written in the Yiddish vernacular.

=== Design ===
Judy was inspired by the Bintel Brief advice column in the Jewish Daily Forward. Literally meaning "a bundle of letters", this letters-to-the-editor column was formed in 1906 to help Eastern European immigrants navigate their way in the New World and allowed them to write to the editor, seeking advice from spiritual questions to family squabbles. They would address their woes to "Dear Worthy Editor", trying to navigate assimilation while retaining their own identities. Judy retroactively explained: "It was a tribute to the courageous immigrants who came to this country at the turn of the century. Their strength… determination… hopes… dreams.…". Alan described it as "very much Jewish immigrants singing about their problems in the new World".

=== Release ===
Dear Worthy Editor, as it would become known, evolved into a full production, and would be performed many times. Its performance life began as concert version named A Bintel Brief. The show was originally performed in local synagogues including Temple Israel, and at one point even included the chazzan of their New Rochelle synagogue as part of the cast. In 1974, producer and director Fred De Feis premiered the piece at his Arena Players Repertory Company playhouse, located in a strip shopping mall across from Republic Airport in East Farmingdale. This pre-Broadway tryout staging, which ran from July 3 through to the end of July, replaced Neil Simon's hit Last of the Red Hot Lovers; tickets were $3 per weekday and $4 on Saturday.

On April 10, 1976, the musical was presented at Beth El Synagogue in New Rochelle, with a cast consisting of Alan Menken, Peggy Atkinson, Sumner Crocket (a chazzan), and Judy Menken.

== Critical reception and legacy ==
Upon presentation at a BMI class, Engel described the musical as either "the most anti-Semitic thing [I've] ever heard in [my] life" or "the most anti-Semitic document since Mein Kampf", which Menken responded to with laughter due to being Jewish himself. Engel, who liked to give his students nicknames, would give Alan the moniker of "D Minor", possibly due to his flagrant use of the key in this musical. In an unnamed newspaper, Elaine Bissel described the musical as "a poignant tale of one family, as it reaches these shores and moves into the American Experience during the early years of this century".

The work became one of the first musicals of Alan Menken, who would have a long and successful career. Newsday described it as "then-unknown Alan Menken's first musical". The New York Times suggests that this musical saw Menken's very first collaboration, even before his collaboration with Howard Ashman began in 1979 with Kurt Vonnegut's God Bless You, Mr. Rosewater. Another stage work based on the same subject matter would be created by American choreographer Rosalind Newman, entitled 4; Stories: A Bintel Brief, Letters to the Editor. Meanwhile, Menken would revisit Jewish themes in his 1997 musical King David.
