= Leap of Faith (musical) =

- Broadway Playbill cover
- Music: Alan Menken
- Lyrics: Glenn Slater
- Book: Janus Cercone; Warren Leight
- Basis: Leap of Faith (1992)
- Productions: 2010 Los Angeles; 2012 Broadway

Leap of Faith is a stage musical based on the 1992 American movie of the same name, which starred Steve Martin. The music is by Alan Menken, with lyrics by Glenn Slater and a book by Janus Cercone and Warren Leight about a con man posing as a man of faith, who is redeemed by the love of a good woman.

The musical premiered in September 2010 in Los Angeles for a limited run through October, directed and choreographed by Rob Ashford. The musical opened on Broadway in April 2012.

== Production history ==
A workshop was held in May 2008, with Taylor Hackford directing. The cast included Raul Esparza as Jonas Nightingale and Elizabeth Stanley as Marla McGowan. At the time, producer Tom Viertel said :"As with any productive workshop of a new musical, we learned a lot about Leap of Faith last month, including what works well and what needs work. But we have no plans and have made no decisions to alter the creative team in any way whatsoever."

Another workshop was held in New York in early 2010, with Sutton Foster and a new director, Rob Ashford.

Leap of Faith, with Rob Ashford as director and choreographer, made its world premiere at the Ahmanson Theatre in Los Angeles, starring Esparza and Brooke Shields. Previews commenced on September 11, 2010, opening night was on October 3, with the run ending October 24.

The show opened on Broadway at the St. James Theatre in previews on April 3, 2012, officially on April 26. Esparza, Jessica Phillips and Kendra Kassebaum played the lead roles, with direction by Christopher Ashley and choreography by Sergio Trujillo. The book was revised by Warren Leight. Composer Alan Menken discussed the style of the songs to Playbill as "flavored with the sounds of gospel, country and American roots music."

The production closed on May 13, 2012, after 24 previews and 20 performances. It was reported by The New York Times that the entire $14 million investment was lost.

== Synopsis ==
Note: Based on the Broadway production

A con artist, the "Reverend" Jonas Nightingale, travels with his ministry, but his bus breaks down in a small Kansas town. The some-time reverend pitches a tent and invites the townspeople to a revival. However, the sheriff, a woman named Marla McGowan, is determined to stop Jonas from taking the people's money. Jonas is challenged when he becomes romantically involved with the sheriff. Her love forces the cynical Reverend to come to terms with his life.

== Original cast and characters ==
Character	Broadway
Character	2012
Jonas Nightingale	Raúl Esparza
Marla McGowan	Jessica Phillips
Sam Nightingale	Kendra Kassebaum
Ida Mae Sturdevant	Kecia Lewis
Isiaiah Sturdevant	Leslie Odom Jr.
Ornella Sturdevant	Krystal Joy Brown
Jake	Talon Ackerman

== Musical numbers ==
Act I

- "Rise Up" — Ida Mae, Ornella, Isaiah, Jonas, Sam & Angels of Mercy
- "Fox in the Henhouse" — Marla & Jonas
- "Fields of the Lord" — Sam, Jonas & Angels of Mercy
- "Step Into the Light" — Ornella, Jonas, Ida Mae, Angels of Mercy & Townspeople
- "Walking Like Daddy" — Isaiah
- "Lost" — Ida Mae & Angels of Mercy
- "I Can Read You" — Marla & Jonas
- "Like Magic" — Jake & Jonas
- "I Can Read You" (Reprise) — Sam & Jonas
- "Dancin' in the Devil's Shoes" — Isaiah, Ornella, Ida Mae & Angels of Mercy
- "King of Sin" — Jonas
- "Dancin' in the Devil's Shoes" (Reprise) — Isaiah, Ornella, Ida Mae, Angels of Mercy & Townspeople

Act II

- "Rise Up" (Reprise) — Angels of Mercy & Townspeople
- "Long Past Dreamin'" — Marla & Jonas
- "Are You on the Bus?" — Ornella, Sam, Ida Mae, Isaiah & Jonas
- "Like Magic" (Reprise) — Jake & Jonas
- "People Like Us" — Sam & Marla
- "Last Chance Salvation" — Jonas, Angels of Mercy & Townspeople
- "If Your Faith Is Strong Enough" — Jonas, Angels of Mercy & Townspeople
- "Jonas's Soliloquy" — Jonas
- "Leap of Faith" — Company

== Critical response ==
=== Los Angeles ===
The Backstage reviewer wrote: "Though the overlong show improves marginally during the home stretch, its story and themes never fully cohere, and the derivative, gospel-driven Alan Menken-Glenn Slater score is disappointing. By inserting superfluous Agnes de Mille-style ballet segments, as if this were a modern-day Rodgers-and-Hammerstein opus, and pumping up the volume and the histrionics, it's clear Menken, director-choreographer Rob Ashford, and co-librettists Slater and Janus Cercone envisioned this adaptation as more of an artsy prestige musical than a sentimental bromide for The Sound of Music crowd ... Esparza has a dynamic singing voice and is a formidable presence, but his Mephistophelean con man seems a shade too smarmy for us to buy into his eventual redemption. The performer also sometimes indulges in a mush-mouthed Brando broodiness that seems inappropriate here. Shields sings sweetly if not spectacularly and provides a welcome note of calmness amid the boisterous goings-on."

Charles McNulty, in his review for the Los Angeles Times, wrote: "much of the score is derivative, the dancing often seems like ballet school parody, Shields' singing defensively retreats to the safest possible key and the closing moments are pure sentimental hokum. But there's a fascinating character in the middle of it all, and a performance by Esparza that digs deep into questions of faith, love and mystery. The show needs another overhaul, but it's easy to see why the creators have persisted for so long with this project: There's something uniquely compelling in the source material. I hope the collaborators press on (Broadway is apparently in their sights). They can begin with some radical pruning."

=== Broadway ===
The show received mixed-to-negative reviews on Broadway, with critics writing generally of the show's unsurprising and predictable plot, Esparza's hardworking performance (whether for good or ill), and a bland and confused tone.

Ben Brantley of The New York Times called the show "this season's black hole of musical comedy, sucking the energy out of anyone who gets near it." He criticized Esparza for "[seeming] to keep a chilly distance from his character", and the show in general for working in "bad faith" and "[recycling] its clichés without a shred of true conviction." Erik Haagensen of Backstage called the "ersatz musical" "a compendium of formulaic characters and clichéd situations all too obviously cribbed from better and more original works"; and Joe Dziemianowicz of the New York Daily News wrote that "nothing happens in this frustrating and manipulative new Broadway musical ... you don't see coming a mile away."

Dziemianowicz also called Esparza's performance "big, bold and a little buggy, but ... never boring", while Elisabeth Vincentelli of the New York Post (in a highly positive review) called his performance somewhat "sinister", but also alluring ("[Y]ou can also see why the good people of Sweetwater would so eagerly swallow Jonas's hooks: He's got some bright, snazzy lures.") Scott Brown of New York Magazine, however, called Esparza "transparently shifty" and "[seeming] to be winking at his marks at every turn", and wrote that "there's not an ounce of adequately feigned sincerity in him."

Brown also described the show as "persistently confused ... in tone, content, and mood", and that "Leap feels like the not-awful, not-wonderful product of a long series of compromises"; Elysa Gardner of USA Today (in a 2 1/2-star out of 4 review) called it "an odd, uneasy mix of souped-up razzle-dazzle and earnest romantic drama"; and David Cote of Time Out New York (in a 2 out of 5-star review) called the show "bland and confused", "never [finding] the right proportion of comic cynicism to wide-eyed spiritual wonder".

Terry Teachout of The Wall Street Journal called the show "as slick as ice on Teflon", lacking in "sweat and heart" - but that "if you're looking for pure Broadway razzmatazz, Leap of Faith delivers the goods".

Some critics, however, were more positive. Vincentelli wrote that while "you can see everything coming a mile away" in the show, "[t]he only surprise is ... how ridiculously fun it is" – and that "[i]f there's a lesson in Leap of Faith, it's that high-energy entertainment is the perfect sweetener". Chris Jones of the Chicago Tribune wrote that the show was "actually an interesting new American musical that, in its best moments, takes a look at a side of America that musicals usually fly right over", while praising the "admirably complex" Esparza as "the guy you want in your show when your leading character is having a crisis of faith", and that the show "delivers, with considerable flourish, the always-useful message that the more you think you know about life, the less the truth reveals itself." David Finkle of TheaterMania described Esparza's performance as "his finest ... to date", and praised the show for having three of that Broadway seasons' best musical numbers (in "I Can Read You", "Dancin' in the Devil's Shoes" and "Are You On the Bus?").

== Awards and nominations ==
=== Original Broadway production ===
Year	Award	Category	Nominee	Result
2012	Tony Award	Best Musical		Nominated
2012	Drama Desk Award	Outstanding Musical		Nominated
2012	Drama Desk Award	Outstanding Book of a Musical	Janus Cercone and Warren Leight	Nominated
2012	Drama Desk Award	Outstanding Actor in a Musical	Raúl Esparza	Nominated
2012	Drama Desk Award	Outstanding Director of a Musical	Christopher Ashley	Nominated
2012	Drama Desk Award	Outstanding Choreography	Sergio Trujillo	Nominated
2012	Drama Desk Award	Outstanding Music	Alan Menken	Nominated
