= I See the Light =

Song by Mandy Moore and Zachary Levi

from the album Tangled: Original Soundtrack
- Published: Wonderland Music Company / Walt Disney Music Company
- Released: November 16, 2010
- Recorded: 2010
- Genre: Folk-pop
- Length: 3:44
- Label: Walt Disney
- Composer: Alan Menken
- Lyricist: Glenn Slater
- Producer: Alan Menken

Audio video
- "I See the Light (From "Tangled" / Soundtrack Version)" on YouTube

"I See the Light" is a song written by composer Alan Menken and lyricist Glenn Slater for Walt Disney Animation Studios' animated film Tangled (2010). A duet originally recorded by American recording artist and actress Mandy Moore and American actor Zachary Levi in their respective film roles as main characters Rapunzel and Flynn Rider, the folk-inspired pop ballad serves as both the film's love and theme song. Lyrically, "I See the Light" describes the developing romantic relationship between Rapunzel and Flynn, and is featured as the seventh track on the film's soundtrack album.

Tangled was originally conceived by Disney animator Glen Keane. Subsequently, Walt Disney Animation Studios hired veteran Disney composer Alan Menken and lyricist Glenn Slater to write the film's songs. Initially, Menken and Slater had written a more anthemic version of "I See the Light" before finally re-working it into a gentler, simpler, and more folk-oriented song. Menken would later reveal that, out of Tangled's five songs and musical numbers, he is most proud of "I See the Light".

"I See the Light" received polarized reviews from film and music critics, who were largely ambivalent towards the song's content, questioning its originality. However, the "lantern sequence", during which "I See the Light" is performed by Rapunzel and Flynn, received high critical acclaim, with journalists and commentators praising its visuals and use of 3-D. Critically, both the song and the scene have been compared to similar romantic musical sequences from preceding Disney animated films, including "Kiss the Girl" from The Little Mermaid (1989) and "A Whole New World" from Aladdin (1992), both of which are love songs also composed by Menken.

In spite of its polarized reviews, "I See the Light" has garnered numerous awards and accolades. The song was nominated for the Academy and Golden Globe awards for Best Original Song in 2010. Subsequently, "I See the Light" won both the Las Vegas Film Critics Society Award for Best Song and the Grammy Award for Best Song Written for Visual Media. Since its release, the song has been recorded and covered by various musical artists, including musical theatre performers David Harris and Lucy Durack, and classical singer Jackie Evancho.

== Background ==
The concept of an animated film based on the Brothers Grimm fairy tale "Rapunzel" originated from Disney animator Glen Keane in 1996. Veteran Disney composer Alan Menken had just recently completed scoring Walt Disney Pictures' Enchanted (2007) when he received a telephone call from Walt Disney Animation Studios in 2008, who invited him to compose the music for the studio's then-upcoming animated film Tangled. Upon accepting, Menken invited frequent collaborator Glenn Slater, with whom he had previously worked on Disney's Home on the Range (2004), and the Broadway musical adaptation of The Little Mermaid (1989), to serve alongside him as his co-writing lyricist once again.

Aware that Tangled would not be "a [traditional] musical like Beauty and the Beast or [The Hunchback of Notre Dame]", on both of which Menken worked as a composer, Menken described the film as a "hybrid" because it is "far from [a] classic break into song musical." For Tangled, Menken challenged himself to come up with a different, unique sound that would differ significantly from the musical styles of his previous Broadway musical-influenced film projects and compositions. Inspired by the ongoing motif of Rapunzel's "long hair and the freedom she wanted", Menken decided to draw particular influence from the musical genre of 1960s folk rock, citing the musicianship and artistry of Canadian singer-songwriter Joni Mitchell as a major source of musical inspiration.

== Writing and recording ==
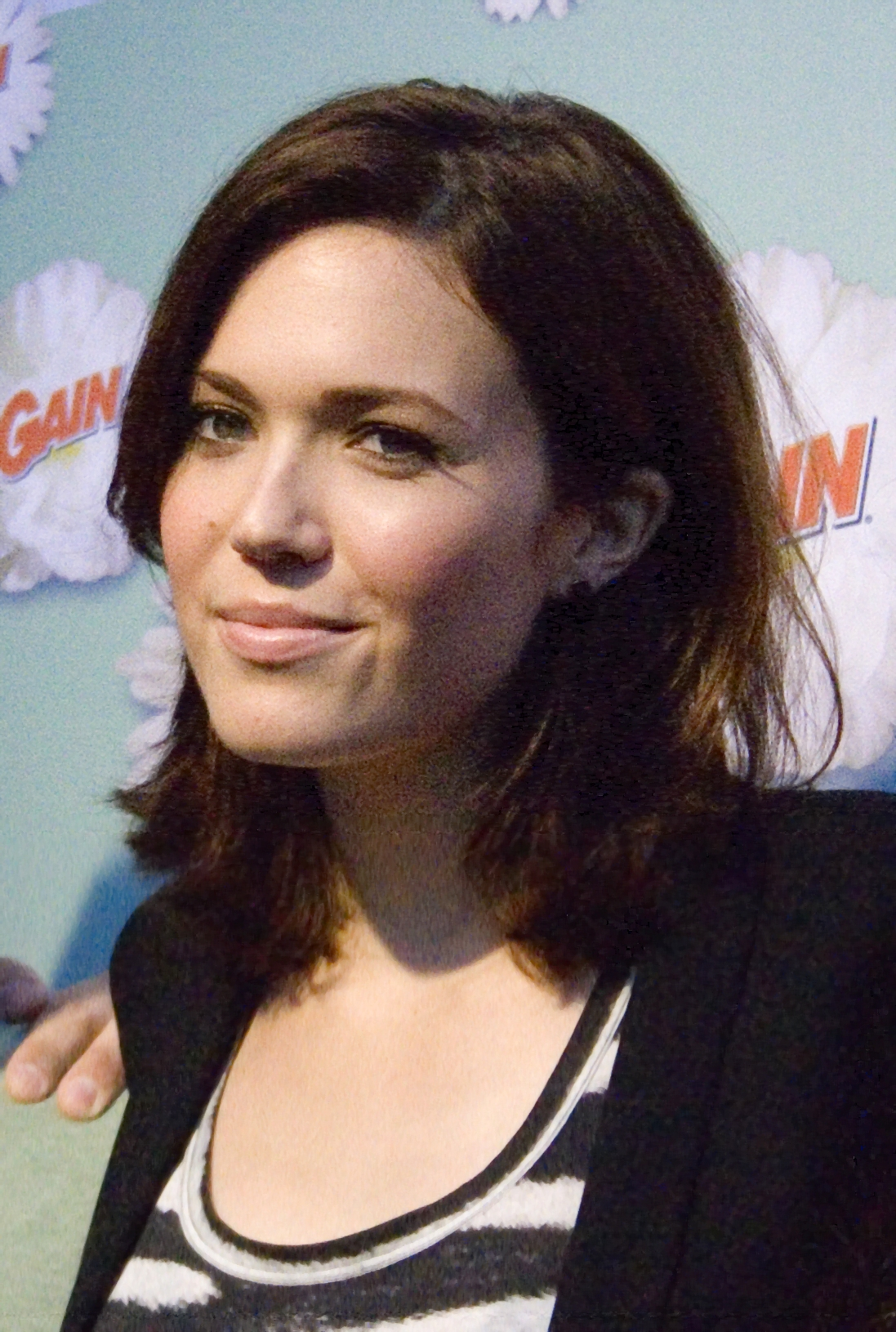
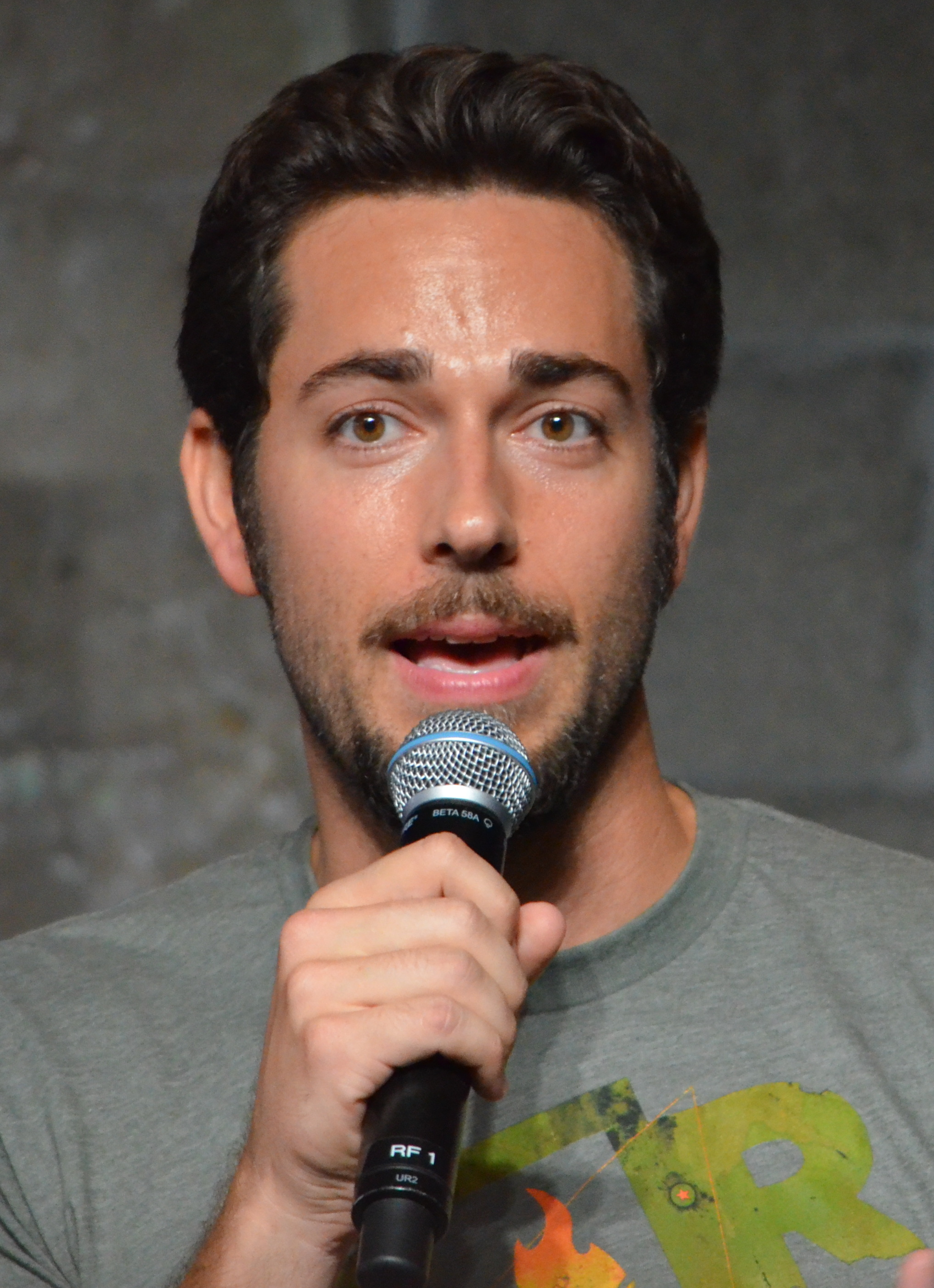
As the respective voices of Rapunzel and Flynn Rider, singer-songwriter Mandy Moore and actor Zachary Levi recorded "I See the Light" for the film and its soundtrack.

When it came to writing the film's songs and musical numbers, Menken and Slater "looked for what is going to be an appropriate song moment for the main characters." In the specific case of "I See the Light", Menken elaborated, "The lantern song ... flows pretty much out of the sense of completion and [Rapunzel] finally sees the lanterns and has this moment. It's more of a montage number."

Menken and Slater had originally intended for "I See the Light" to sound more "anthem-like". The songwriters eventually changed their minds, deciding to re-write "I See the Light" into a gentler, more folk-oriented song. Menken spoke of the creative writing process, "we began throwing melodies up, doing songs and riffs and harmonies, and we waited for something to stick". Additionally, Menken later admitted that, out of Tangled's five songs and musical numbers, he is most proud of "I See the Light" because it "is a great moment in the film and I am very happy with the beauty and simplicity of the song."

Similarly, co-director Byron Howard also took an immediate liking towards the song. Hailing "I See the Light" as his favorite of the film's songs, Howard elaborated, "The moment [co-director Nathan Greno and I] heard Alan Menken's demo we knew that one would be a classic."

A romantic duet performed during the narrative portion of the film by its 2 main characters, Rapunzel and Flynn Rider, "I See the Light" was recorded by American recording artist and actress Mandy Moore as the voice of Rapunzel and American actor Zachary Levi as the voice of Flynn Rider. While filming Tangled, Moore and Levi met to work with each other only twice, one of which was to record the vocals for "I See the Light". According to Levi, he and Moore first rehearsed the song live accompanied by the film's 80-piece orchestra before eventually being divided into separate isolation booths to record their respective lyrics, verses and harmonies individually.

== Context and scene ==
Occurring towards the end of Tangled, "I See the Light" takes place during the film's second act soon after Rapunzel and Flynn Rider have finally completed their grueling journey from Mother Gothel's tower to Corona, arriving in the kingdom just in time to experience its annual lantern-lighting ceremony, which Rapunzel has spent 18 years – her entire life – observing at a distance from the confinement of Gothel's tower. There the couple embarks on a boat ride to watch the ceremony as "the night sky [is] illuminated with a sea of lanterns." During the pivotal scene, described by critics as the film's "emotional peak" because "Rapunzel's dream of watching the floating lanterns seems to be reali[z]ed", the musical number both "highlights the ... flight of the lanterns" while essentially triggering Rapunzel and Flynn's "budding romance", who are gradually beginning to fall in love.

Screenshot from Tangled depicting Rapunzel and Flynn Rider during the "I See the Light" lantern sequence.

According to Marianne Paluso of the Catholic News Agency, Rapunzel, during the scene, "finally sees for herself the wondrous floating lanterns she's yearned to see her entire life". Meanwhile, the audience is shown the way in which "love ... has blossomed between" the film's 2 main characters. Commonly referred to by critics as one of Tangled's "show-stopping moments", Rapunzel and Flynn perform the romantic duet while "play[ing] off each other" as they continue to fall in love.

As a result of the song's setting, romantic context and lyrical content, several comparisons have been drawn between both the song and its corresponding scene and various romantic musical sequences from a number of preceding Disney animated feature films, the most frequently referenced of which are "Kiss the Girl" from The Little Mermaid (1989) and "A Whole New World" from Aladdin (1992), both romantic ballads also composed by Menken. One particular reviewer, Steven D. Greydanus of Decent Films Guide, drew comparisons between the scene and the musical "Nutcracker Suite" sequence from Disney's animated feature film Fantasia (1940), describing it as "a moment of visual transcendence."

Throughout the filmmaking process, Tangled's co-directors Byron Howard and Nathan Greno continued to hold the scene in particularly high regard, constantly boasting to the production team that "I See the Light" "will be the most spectacular animated sequence you've ever seen." According to Greno, the use of 45,000 floating lanterns during the scene was directly inspired by traditional Indonesian ceremonies during which people "set up rice paper lanterns and send them into the sky."

== Composition ==
A "dreamy" love song that embodies a "classic romantic feel", "I See the Light" is a "peppy and cheerful" romantic pop ballad accompanied by a "soaring" melody that spans a length of three minutes and forty-four seconds. Stylistically combining both classical and contemporary music with folk influences, the lyrics of the "endearing" romantic duet center around main characters Rapunzel and Flynn while describing their developing romantic relationship, which is finally beginning to allow the couple to "[see] life in a whole new way" as they "begin to connect romantically," ultimately falling in love.

According to the song's official sheet music, published by Walt Disney Music Publishing. "I See the Light" is a mid-tempo pop ballad, written in the key of C major (later changing to E♭ major) at a tempo of 104 beats per minute. Combined, Moore and Levi's vocal ranges span over 2 octaves, with Levi singing the low note of B♭_{2} and Moore singing the high note of E♭_{5}. In addition to vocals, the song's instrumentation also encompasses harp, acoustic guitar and orchestra.

== Reception ==
=== Critical reception ===
==== Song ====
Musically, "I See the Light" has received polarized reviews from critics, many of whom were generally underwhelmed by the film's songs.

Catherine Jones of the Liverpool Echo reviewed "I See the Light" positively, hailing the song as a "rousing love ballad". While Jessica Dawson of Common Sense Media described "I See the Light" as a "sweet duet" between Rapunzel and Flynn. Common Sense Media's Sandie Angulo Chen called it a "great" love song. Lindsey Ward of Canoe.ca praised both Moore and Levi's vocal performance, commenting, "their work on the film's signature love ballad ... is bound to melt some hearts."

Meanwhile, several critics have reacted much less favorably towards "I See the Light". Scott Chitwood of ComingSoon.net described the song as nothing more than "pretty good". Tim McCall of The Star-Ledger reviewed "I See the Light" very negatively, describing it as both "predictable" and "the sort of thing you'd plug your ears through". McCall went on to pan Slater's lyrics, describing them as a "dull ... 20-car pileup of cliche." Time's Richard Corliss described "I See the Light" as a "generically tuneful love ballad". In another review, Corliss similarly commented, "'I See the Light' ... isn't the most inventive of Menken melodies". Questioning the song's originality, Cindy White of IGN described "I See the Light" as "unmemorable". Filmtracks.com wrote a mixed review, describing Levi's vocal performance as "conservatively appropriate" while criticizing Moore for "lacking in depth of inflection."

==== Lantern sequence ====
The picture goes from strength to strength, with ... some amazing animation set pieces, culminating in a love ballad set against a backdrop of floating lanterns that's among the most dazzling pieces of moving artwork executed in any animated movie, Disney or otherwise, ever.

— Glenn Kenny of MSN Movies' very positive analysis of the sequence.

Contrastingly, the climactic musical sequence during which "I See the Light" is performed by Rapunzel and Flynn, commonly referred to as the "lantern sequence", has fared significantly better than the song itself, garnering widespread acclaim from film critics. Keith Uhlich of Time Out described the scene as "especially wonderful", while Digital Spy's Simon Reynolds similarly hailed it as one of the film's most "striking moments". Although Georgie Hobbs of Little White Lies wrote that, lyrically, "I See the Light" is "nothing special", she went on to praise the scene, describing it as a "treat ... that will clinch it for romantics and 3-D tech-heads alike." Radio Times' Alan Jones labeled the sequence one of the film's "most beautifully uplifting moments". Similarly, Christian Blauvelt of Slant Magazine highlighted the scene as one of Tangled's "few moments of otherworldly beauty". A. O. Scott of The New York Times wrote, "A scene of paper lanterns descending through mist onto water is especially breathtaking, partly because it departs from the usual 3-D insistence on deep focus and sharply-defined images, creating an experience that is almost tactile in its dreamy softness."

Dan Kois of Westword commented, "while Tangled's 3-D is mostly unobtrusive, the lights swooping over the audience might be the most crowd-pleasing 3-dimensional filigree I've seen yet." Rediff.com's Sukanya Verma praised both the scene and the song, writing, "it's the luminous imagery of ["I See the Light"], merging the reach of technology with Menken's sublime melody that produces a spectacular celluloid moment." Tasha Robinson of The A. V. Club opined, "even a falling-in-love sequence cribbed in part from The Little Mermaid is overwhelmingly magical." Colin Covert of the Star Tribune wrote, "A romantic boat-ride beneath a constellation of floating lanterns is one of the more breathtaking episodes of gratuitous beauty". MSN Movies' Glenn Kenny hailed the scene as one of "the most dazzling pieces of moving artwork executed in any animated movie, Disney or otherwise, ever."

=== Accolades ===
The Academy of Motion Picture Arts and Sciences decided to modify the nomination rules pertaining to the Academy Award for Best Original Song after Menken's Enchanted garnered 3 separate nominations for the award in 2008, decreasing the nomination limit from 3 to only 2 from any individual film. After the release of Tangled, Menken revealed that the studio will only be submitting 1 song from the film to the Academy of Motion Picture Arts and Sciences for consideration for the Best Original Song award at the 83rd Academy Awards in 2011 "to avoid songs canceling each other out if nominated." Menken decided upon "I See the Light" because he considers it "the heart-and-center of the film" and "seems to be the one that can break out." Additionally, several critics expected the song to win Best Original Song, including Time's Richard Corliss.

'I See the Light' is the heart and center of this movie and it's a beautiful sequence, so it's our best option. I'm proud of the others as well, but ... 'I See the Light' seems to be the one that can break out."
— Menken, on his reason for submitting "I See the Light".

As widely anticipated, "I See the Light" was nominated for the Academy Award for Best Original Song at the 83rd Academy Awards in 2011, becoming Menken's nineteenth Academy Award nomination. Menken said of the accomplishment, "I don't take it for granted at all". However, the song ultimately lost to Randy Newman's "We Belong Together" from Toy Story 3 (2010), another animated feature film released by Walt Disney Pictures, produced by Pixar Animation Studios. Previously, "I See the Light" had garnered a Golden Globe nomination for Best Original Song at the 68th Golden Globe Awards in 2011, which it lost to "You Haven't Seen the Last of Me" from Burlesque (2010), written by Diane Warren and performed by Cher. Lastly, "I See the Light" was nominated for Best Song at the 16th Broadcast Film Critics Association Awards in 2011, losing to "If I Rise" from 127 Hours (2010).

"I See the Light" went on to win the Las Vegas Film Critics Society Award for Best Song in 2010, and the Best Song Written for Visual Media Award at the 54th Grammy Awards in 2012.

Babble.com ranked "I See the Light" as one of the "Greatest ... Disney Movie Moments".

== Performances and cover versions ==
In celebration of the song's Best Original Song nomination, Moore and Levi performed "I See the Light" live at the 83rd Academy Awards in February 2011, accompanied by Menken himself on piano. For the performance, Moore asked that she be provided with a "show-stopping" dress, specifically requesting that it not resemble a Disney costume. To comply, fashion designer Monique Lhuillier "incorporated elements of 3 dresses Moore loved" into the final dress, resulting in a full-skirted cobalt blue gown. Moore revealed that she was feeling confident about the performance "until about 2 minutes before the show". Moore also said of the performance, "It was the most intimidating audience I performed for ... I made a point not to look at anyone … because I was nervous."

Australian actor and singer David Harris included his rendition of "I See the Light" on his second studio album At This Stage (2011), recording the song as a duet with Australian actress Lucy Durack. Theatre People's Simon Parris wrote of Harris' version, "the gorgeous duet .. will have listeners rushing out to watch their Tangled blu-ray again." American classical singer Jackie Evancho recorded "I See the Light" for her fourth studio album Songs from the Silver Screen (2012) as a duet with American singer Jacob Evancho, her elder brother. Amazon.com described Evancho's rendition as a "very special duet."

== Certifications ==
Certifications and sales for "I See the Light"
Region	Certification	Certified units/sales
Brazil (Pro-Música Brasil) Portuguese Version	Platinum	60,000^{‡}
New Zealand (RMNZ)	Platinum	30,000^{‡}
United Kingdom (BPI)	Platinum	600,000^{‡}
United States (RIAA)	3× Platinum	3,000,000^{‡}
^{‡} Sales+streaming figures based on certification alone.
