= Alan Menken =

American composer (born 1949)

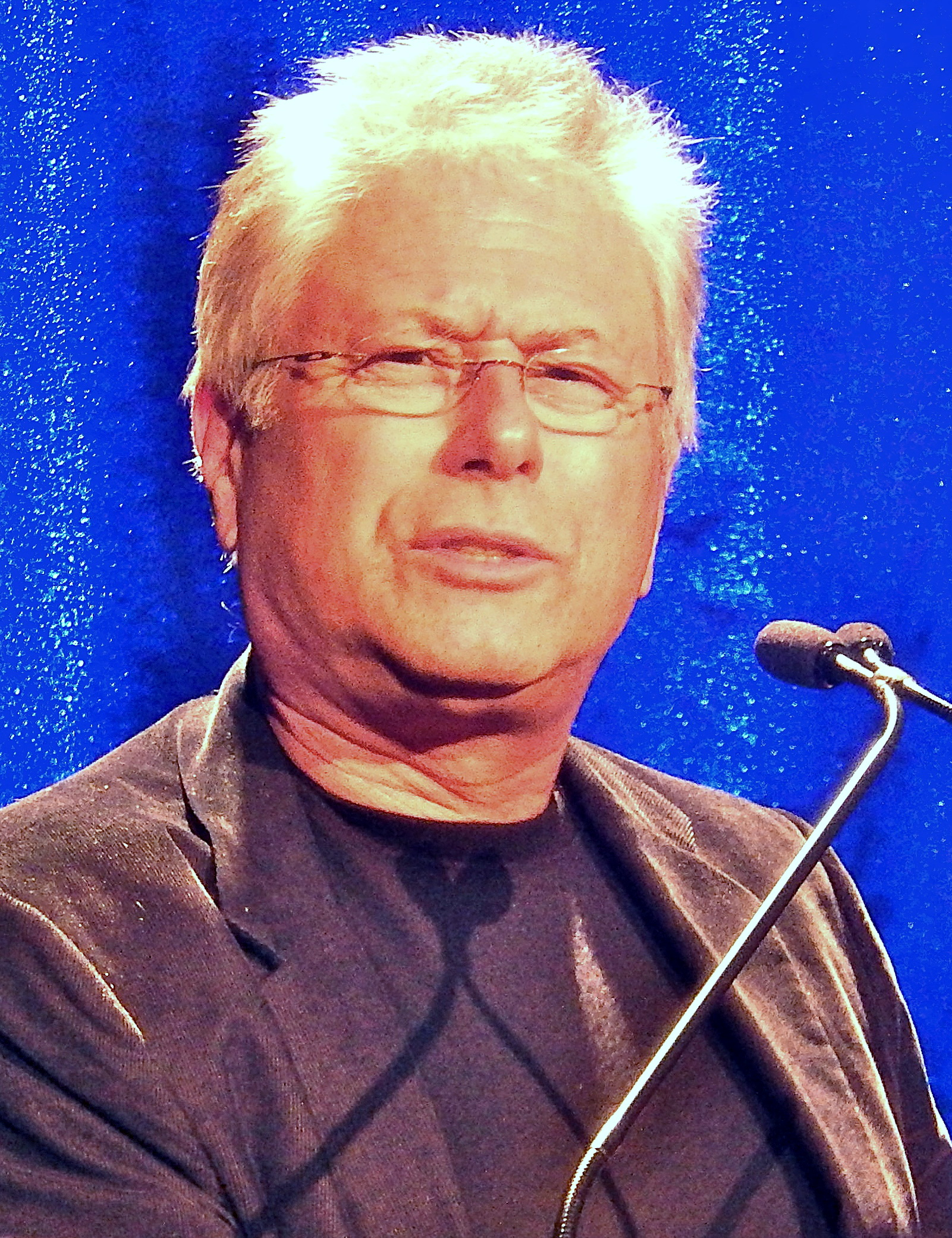
- Menken in 2013

Background information
- Born: Alan Irwin Menken; July 22, 1949 (age 77); Manhattan, New York City, U.S.
- Education: New York University (BA)
- Genres: Pop; musical theatre; film score
- Occupations: Composer; conductor; arranger; music director; music producer
- Years active: 1972–present
- Label: Walt Disney
- Spouse: Janis Roswick (m. 1972)
- Website: www.alanmenken.com

Alan Irwin Menken (born July 22, 1949) is an American composer and conductor. Over his career he has received numerous accolades including winning eight Academy Awards, a Tony Award, eleven Grammy Awards, seven Golden Globe Awards, and a Daytime Emmy Award. He is one of 28 recipients to have won the competitive EGOT (Emmy, a Grammy, an Oscar, and a Tony).

He is best known for his scores and songs for films produced by Walt Disney Animation Studios. Menken's contributions to The Little Mermaid (1989), Beauty and the Beast (1991), Aladdin (1992), and Pocahontas (1995) won him two Academy Awards for each film. He also composed the scores and songs for Little Shop of Horrors (1986), Newsies (1992), The Hunchback of Notre Dame (1996), Hercules (1997), Home on the Range (2004), Enchanted (2007), Tangled (2010), Disenchanted (2022), and Spellbound (2024), among others.

He is also known for his work in musical theater for Broadway, winning the Tony Award for Best Original Score for Newsies (2012). He was Tony-nominated for Beauty and the Beast (1993), The Little Mermaid (2008), Sister Act (2009), and Aladdin (2014). His other stage hits include Little Shop of Horrors (1982), A Christmas Carol (1994), Leap of Faith (2012), and A Bronx Tale (2016).

Menken has collaborated with lyricists such as Christopher Lennertz, Howard Ashman, Jack Feldman, Tim Rice, Lynn Ahrens, Stephen Schwartz, David Zippel, Glenn Slater, Benj Pasek and Justin Paul, and Lin-Manuel Miranda.

== Early life and education ==
Alan Irwin Menken was born on July 22, 1949, at French Hospital in Chelsea, Manhattan, to Judith and Norman Menken. His father was a boogie-woogie piano-playing dentist, and his mother was an actress, dancer, and playwright. His family was Jewish. Menken developed an interest in music at an early age, taking piano and violin lessons. He began to compose at an early age. At age nine, at the New York Federation of Music Clubs Junior Composers Contest, his original composition "Bouree" was rated Superior and Excellent by the judges.

Menken noted that "Before college, I was writing songs to further my dream of being the next Bob Dylan. A lot of guitar songs – I was composing on piano before that."

He attended New Rochelle High School in New Rochelle, New York, and graduated in 1967. Menken remembers: "I'd make up my own Bach fugues and Beethoven sonatas because I was bored with the piano and I didn't want to practice; so I'd go off on tangents". He then enrolled at New York University. Menken graduated in 1972 from University College of Arts and Science at the Heights campus, which is now the College of Arts and Science. After college, he attended the BMI Lehman Engel Musical Theatre Workshop.

Menken recalled: "First, I was pre-med. I thought I'd be a dentist like my dad. Finally, I got a degree in music, but I didn't care about musicology. It wasn't until I joined BMI Workshop ... under Lehman Engel, and walked into a room with other composers that I knew this was it."

== Career ==
=== 1974–1987: Early career and breakthrough ===
After graduating, Menken's plan was to become either a rock star or a recording artist. His interest in writing musicals increased when he joined the Broadcast Music, Inc. (BMI) Musical Theatre Workshop and was mentored by Lehman Engel. From 1974 to 1978, he showcased various BMI workshop works, such as Midnight, Apartment House (lyric by Muriel Robinson), Conversations with Pierre, Harry the Rat and Messiah on Mott Street (lyrics by David Spencer). According to Menken, during this period, he "worked as a ballet and modern dance accompanist, a musical director for club acts, a jingle writer, arranger, a songwriter for Sesame Street and a vocal coach". He performed his material at clubs like The Ballroom, Reno Sweeny and Tramps.

In 1976, John Wilson reported for The New York Times that members of Engel's BMI Workshop began performing as part of the "Broadway at the Ballroom" series: "The opening workshop program ... featured Maury Yeston and Alan Menken, both playing their piano accompaniment and singing songs they have written for potential musicals." Wilson reviewed a performance at the Ballroom in 1977 where Menken accompanied a singer: "In the current cabaret world, a piano accompanist is no longer expected to merely play piano for a singer. More and more, pianists can be heard joining in vocally, harmonizing with the singer, creating a background of shouts and exclamations or even doing brief passages of solo singing."

Menken contributed material to revues like New York's Back in Town, Big Apple Country, The Present Tense (1977), Real Life Funnies (Off-Broadway, 1981), Diamonds (Off-Broadway, 1984), and Personals (Off-Off-Broadway, 1985). His revue Patch, Patch, Patch ran at the West Bank Cafe in New York City in 1979 and featured Chip Zien. The New York Times reviewer Mel Gussow wrote: "The title song ... refers to a life's passage. According to Alan Menken ... after age 30 it is a downhill plunge." Menken wrote several shows that were not produced, including Atina, Evil Queen of the Galaxy (1980), with lyrics by Steve Brown. He also wrote The Thorn with lyrics by Brown, which was commissioned by Divine in 1980. This was a parody of the film The Rose, but they could not raise the money to have it produced. He collaborated with Howard Ashman in an uncompleted musical called Babe (c. 1981), with Tom Eyen in Kicks: The Showgirl Musical (1984), and with David Rogers in The Dream in Royal Street (c. 1981), which was an adaptation of A Midsummer Night's Dream. Menken contributed music for the film The Line (1980), directed by Robert J. Siegel.

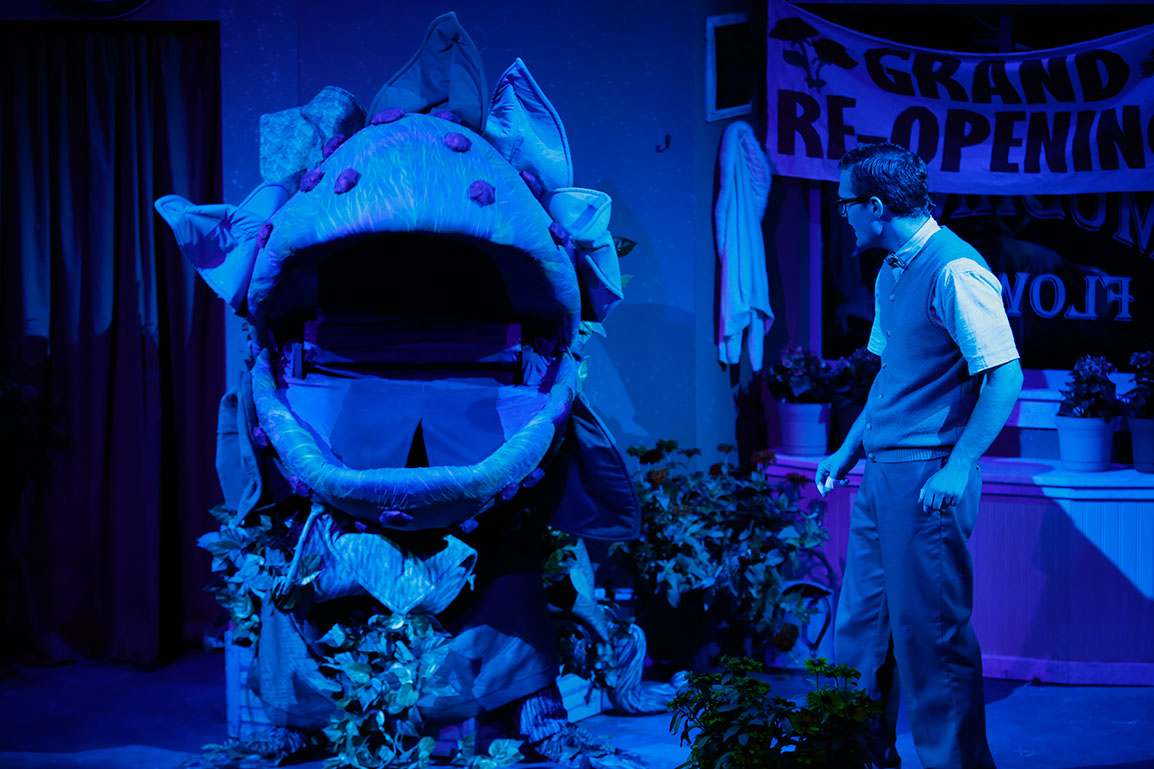
Menken achieved success with Ashman with Little Shop of Horrors (1982)

Menken finally achieved success as a composer when playwright Howard Ashman chose him and Engel to write the music for his musical adaptation of Kurt Vonnegut's novel God Bless You, Mr. Rosewater. The musical opened in 1979 at the WPA Theater to excellent reviews and modest box office. It transferred after several months to the Off-Broadway Entermedia Theater, where it ran for an additional six weeks. Menken and Ashman wrote their next musical, Little Shop of Horrors, for a cast of only 9 performers, including a puppeteer. This musical is based on the 1960 black comedy film The Little Shop of Horrors. It opened at WPA Theater in 1982 to warm reviews. It moved to the Off Broadway Orpheum Theatre in the East Village, Manhattan, where it ran for five years. The musical set the box-office record for highest grossing Off-Broadway show of all time. It toured around the world, won theater awards and was adapted as a 1986 musical film starring Rick Moranis that earned Menken and Ashman their first Oscar nomination for the song "Mean Green Mother from Outer Space". For his body of work in musical theatre, he was awarded the BMI Career Achievement Award in 1983.

In 1987, Menken and lyricist David Spencer's adaptation The Apprenticeship of Duddy Kravitz, based on the 1959 novel of the same name, was produced in Philadelphia. After substantial re-writes, it was produced in 2015 in Montreal. In 1992, the WPA Theatre produced Menken's Weird Romance, also with lyrics by Spencer. Menken's musical based on the Charles Dickens novella A Christmas Carol, with lyrics by Lynn Ahrens and book by Mike Ockrent, debuted at Madison Square Garden's Paramount Theater in 1994. The show proved successful and was an annual New York holiday event. From 1989 to 1990, Menken and Howard Ashman wrote songs for the popular puppet TV show Sesame Street. In 2008, Menken said that his work on Sesame Street was "pathetic money, but it still had some prestige to it. It was on the air and [he] was getting some royalties". The duo also wrote a song titled "Wonderful Ways to Say No" for the 1990 animated anti-drug special Cartoon All-Stars to the Rescue.

=== 1989–2007: Disney Renaissance and Broadway work ===
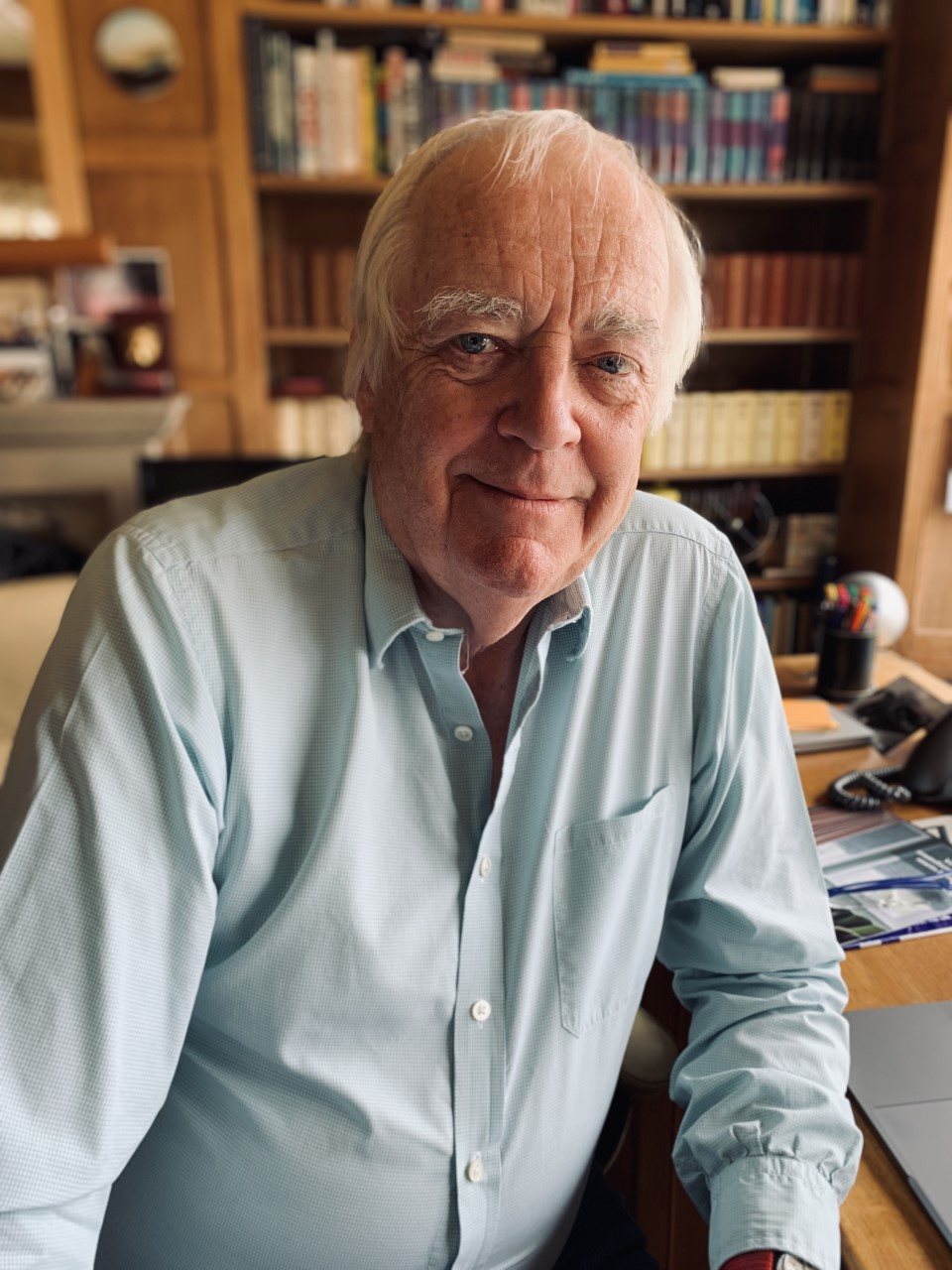
During this time Menken worked with lyricist Tim Rice

On the strength of the success of Little Shop of Horrors, Menken and Ashman were hired by Walt Disney Studios to write the music for The Little Mermaid (1989). The challenge was to create an animated musical film of this Hans Christian Andersen fairy tale that could sit alongside the Disney films Snow White and the Seven Dwarfs and Cinderella. The Little Mermaid opened to critical and commercial success and signaled a new Disney era called the Disney Renaissance. The film gave them their first Academy Award win: Best Song for the song "Under the Sea". Menken also won the 1989 Academy Award for Best Score. Critic Roger Ebert declared in his review, [the film] contains some of the best Disney music since the glory days."

Menken and Ashman's Beauty and the Beast garnered them three 1991 Academy Award nominations for Best Song, winning for its title song. Menken won another Academy Award for Best Score. The two were working on Aladdin at the time of Ashman's death in 1991. Ashman wrote only three songs in the film and Menken collaborated with Tim Rice, who was then working on The Lion King, to write the rest of the songs for the film. The film won an Academy Award in 1992 for Best Song, "A Whole New World". Menken also won the Oscar for Best Score. Menken debuted on Broadway with a musical theater adaptation of Beauty and the Beast that opened in 1994 and ran for 13 years before closing in 2007. In 1997, he collaborated with lyricist Tim Rice on a musical, King David, based on the biblical character, which was performed in a concert version on Broadway at the New Amsterdam Theatre. Little Shop of Horrors played on Broadway from 2003 to 2004.

Menken's live-action musical film Newsies, with lyrics by Jack Feldman, was released in 1992. Three more animated musical films followed. Menken collaborated with Stephen Schwartz for Pocahontas, for which the two won two Academy Awards: Best Song and Best Musical or Comedy Score. In 1996, the same musical team created the songs, and Menken, the score, for The Hunchback of Notre Dame. In 1997, Menken reunited with his early collaborator, David Zippel, for his last film in the era, Hercules. Menken also wrote the music for the Michael J. Fox vehicle Life with Mikey (1993), the holiday film Noel (2004) and Mirror Mirror (2012). His other film scores for Disney have included Home on the Range (2004), the Tim Allen remake of The Shaggy Dog (2006), Enchanted (2007), and Tangled (2010).

=== 2008–2016: Return to Broadway ===
He next created the stage version of The Little Mermaid, which played on Broadway from 2008 to 2009 and for which he received a nomination for a Tony Award for Best Score. Menken's stage adaptation of Sister Act debuted in London in 2009, and opened on Broadway in 2011. He was nominated for another Tony Award for Best Score. Menken received a star on the Hollywood Walk of Fame in 2010. In December 2010, he was a guest on the NPR quiz show Wait Wait... Don't Tell Me!. In 2012, Menken won a Tony Award for Best Score for his musical adaptation of Newsies, which ran until 2014. He also wrote the music for Leap of Faith, which had a brief run on Broadway in 2012. His stage adaptation of Aladdin opened on Broadway in 2014, earning him another Tony nomination for Best Score. In 2013, he was a guest at the annual Junior Theatre Festival in Atlanta, Georgia, and was honored with the Junior Theater Festival Award. He gave a concert there, including music that was cut from various productions, while talking about his creative process.

Menken's stage adaptation of The Hunchback of Notre Dame played at La Jolla Playhouse, California, in 2014. In 2015, Menken co-composed the score for the musical television series Galavant alongside Christopher Lennertz, reuniting him with Tangled screenwriter Dan Fogelman. Menken also co-wrote songs for the series alongside Glenn Slater. The series lasted two seasons, first airing on January 4, 2015, and last airing on January 31, 2016. The Apprenticeship of Duddy Kravitz was revived in Montreal in 2015, and A Bronx Tale: The Musical played at the Paper Mill Playhouse in 2016. Menken is currently working on stage musical adaptations of Night at the Museum and Animal Farm.

=== 2017–present: Live-action Disney films ===
Menken wrote songs for a prospective prequel/spin-off series to 2017's Beauty and the Beast titled Little Town, which would be centered on Gaston and LeFou. The series would be released on Disney's streaming service, Disney+, and Menken would also be an executive-producer on the series. In February 2022, it was reported that the series would not go forward for now. In March 2017, Disney released a live-action adaptation of Beauty and the Beast, directed by Bill Condon and starring Emma Watson and Dan Stevens, with the songs from the 1991 film and new material by Menken and Rice. Menken collaborated with Benj Pasek and Justin Paul on writing new songs for the 2019 live-action version of Aladdin, directed by Guy Ritchie.

As of 2019, Menken reunites with his Newsies creators Jack Feldman and Harvey Fierstein to develop a new musical called Greetings from Niagara Falls. A reading was held in January 2019; however, there is no word on future plans for the project at this time. In 2017, Menken and Slater returned to write songs for the animated series Rapunzel's Tangled Adventure, which is set after the events of Tangled. The series ended in 2020, after three seasons. On July 26, 2020, Menken and Slater won the Daytime Emmy Award for Original Song in a Children's, Young Adult or Animated Program for the song titled "Waiting in the Wings".

Menken again worked with Stephen Schwartz to write new songs for Disenchanted, the sequel to Enchanted. Menken also worked on new music for a live-action film adaptation of The Little Mermaid, directed by Rob Marshall, with longtime The Little Mermaid fan Lin-Manuel Miranda, whom Menken knew since the former's childhood, as Miranda went to the same school as Menken's niece. Menken also worked alongside former Disney chief creative officer John Lasseter on a project at Skydance Animation. On May 20, 2020, the project was revealed to be Vicky Jenson's Spellbound. Menken co-wrote songs for Spellbound alongside collaborated with lyricist Glenn Slater, with whom he worked on Home on the Range and Tangled. Menken is also reportedly attached to a sequel to Aladdin. Menken was set to work with Schwartz to write new songs for a remake of The Hunchback of Notre Dame, which Menken would score. However, in May 2023, Menken suggested that the development had been stalled due to the original movie's content and themes.

With eight Academy Awards, only composer Alfred Newman (nine wins), art director Cedric Gibbons (11 wins) and Walt Disney (22 wins) have received more Academy Awards than Menken. He is tied for fourth place with late costume designer Edith Head, and currently holds the record for the most wins for a living person.

== Personal life ==
Menken was introduced to ballet dancer Janis Roswick while working with the Downtown Ballet Company. They have been married since November 1972 and live in North Salem, New York with their two daughters, Anna and Nora.

In 2024, he was one of 500 Jewish directors, filmmakers, and creative professionals who signed an open letter supporting Jonathan Glazer in the midst of the backlash he received as a result of his Oscar acceptance speech condemning Israel’s actions in Palestine.

== Artistry and reception ==
Menken described his signature style of songwriting as pop and rock music married with a "theatrical sensibility" derived from working with theatre composers Lehman Engel and Maury Yeston. Darryn King of The Sydney Morning Herald observed that Menken's first three Disney films alone demonstrated a wide range of musical genres and styles, namely sea shanties, German cabaret, French music hall, Mozart operetta, and "the Harlem grooves of Fats Waller and Cab Calloway". Writing for the same publication, Debbie Cuthbertson identified romance, swelling strings, and humour as trademarks of Menken's songs. Menken said he prefers his compositions to be "hummable", and emphasized the importance of creating infectious melodies and rhythms that elicit desired emotions.

Menken described himself as a chameleon in terms of his composing process. When writing for Disney films in particular, he attempts to progress the story in a manner appropriate for each character and dramatic situation by gathering as much information as possible about the project before composing using a piano. His music is also created prior to the scripts and storyboards. Menken records his own demos using either a straight piano-vocal or piano-vocal-MIDI orchestral arrangement. He maintains that there is little value in writing music that does not elicit strong emotional responses from listeners. Apple Music said the composer's work is "Rich with the tones, colors, and textures that help viewers feel those big moments deep in their hearts". Although he rarely orchestrates or conducts his own work, he produces his film's soundtracks and remains in the control room during recording sessions. Menken has written with numerous lyricists throughout his career, his most famous collaboration remaining his songwriting partnership with Ashman, despite having worked together for a relatively short period of time. He initially wrote both music and lyrics and considers himself to be a strong lyricist, but decided to focus on composing upon meeting Ashman. He said he enjoys working with different lyricists because "they reflect different dimensions of my career". Lyricist and frequent collaborator Glenn Slater said Menken is arguably "the greatest melodist that we've had in the theatre and the film world for the past 30 years".

Steve Hochman of Grammy.com said Menken "ranks among the top composers in film and theater", writing, "his music is part of the DNA of several generations of children and parents alike". In 2024, Katcy Stephan of Variety said of Menken "he remains one of the industry's most sought-after songwriters". Playbill's Logan Culwell-Block described Menken as "one of musical theatre's most prolific composers—but what puts him in an elite class is not the quantity of his output, but its quality". According to Jeff Bond of The Hollywood Reporter, Menken is largely responsible for redefining the musical genre for a contemporary audience both in film and on stage, calling him "one of film music's most versatile craftspeople". Phil Sweetland of American Songwriter credited Menken's work for Disney with preserving musical theater after the genre had fallen into decline following the Golden Age of musicals, before its resurgence in the 1990s and early 2000s. However, King observed that, despite his achievements, Menken's work is often overlooked and dismissed due to his affiliation with animation and children's entertainment. Menken himself has said he dislikes writing specifically for children, despite the target audience of much of his best-known projects, and credits Ashman with teaching him not to write directly to children. Menken explained that "I never write for kids ... I write for myself. I want to tell a story. I want to make those kids feel like I felt when I saw those earlier movies". His work has influenced a generation of songwriters across film and stage. Menken has noted his influence on songwriters and musicians such as Benj Pasek, Justin Paul, Robert Lopez, Kristen Anderson-Lopez, Lin-Manuel Miranda, Elton John, and Sara Bareilles, although he maintains he does not have a specific protege. Although Lopez believes Menken can practically do anything, he possesses in particular "a God-given gift for a heartfelt emotional melody that will bring tears to your eyes".

Menken is an EGOT winner, having won at least one Emmy, Grammy, Oscar and Tony for his work.

== Works ==
=== Film ===
Year	Title	Director(s)	Credited as				Notes
Year	Title	Director(s)	Composer	Songwriter	Score producer	Actor	Notes
1972	A Dancer's Life	William Richert	No	No	No	Yes	Documentary film
1986	Little Shop of Horrors	Frank Oz	No	Yes	No	No	Composed original and new songs with lyrics by Howard Ashman; score by Miles Goodman
1989	The Little Mermaid	John Musker; Ron Clements	Yes	Yes	Yes	No	First score for an animated film Composed songs with lyrics by Howard Ashman
1990	Rocky V	John G. Avildsen	No	Yes	No	No	Composed song "Measure of a Man"; score by Bill Conti
1991	Beauty and the Beast	Gary Trousdale; Kirk Wise	Yes	Yes	Yes	No	Composed songs with lyrics by Howard Ashman
1992	Newsies	Kenny Ortega	No	Yes	No	No	Composed songs with lyrics by Jack Feldman; score by J.A.C. Redford; First score for a live-action film
1992	Home Alone 2: Lost in New York	Chris Columbus	No	Yes	No	No	Composed song "My Christmas Tree" with lyrics by Jack Feldman; score by John Williams
1992	Aladdin	John Musker; Ron Clements	Yes	Yes	Yes	No	Composed songs with lyrics by Howard Ashman & Tim Rice
1993	Life with Mikey	James Lapine	Yes	Yes	No	No	Composed songs "Cold Enough to Snow" and "Life with Mikey Theme" with lyrics by Stephen Schwartz & Jack Feldman
1995	Pocahontas	Mike Gabriel; Eric Goldberg	Yes	Yes	Yes	No	Composed songs with lyrics by Stephen Schwartz
1996	The Hunchback of Notre Dame	Gary Trousdale; Kirk Wise	Yes	Yes	Yes	No	Composed songs with lyrics by Stephen Schwartz
1997	Hercules	John Musker; Ron Clements	Yes	Yes	Yes	No	Composed songs with lyrics by David Zippel
2004	Home on the Range	Will Finn; John Sanford	Yes	Yes	No	No	Composed songs with lyrics by Glenn Slater
2004	Noel	Chazz Palminteri	Yes	Yes	Yes	No	Composed song "Winter Light" with lyrics by Stephen Schwartz
2006	The Shaggy Dog	Brian Robbins	Yes	No	No	No	
2007	Enchanted	Kevin Lima	Yes	Yes	No	No	Composed songs with lyrics by Stephen Schwartz
2010	Tangled	Byron Howard; Nathan Greno	Yes	Yes	Yes	No	Composed songs with lyrics by Glenn Slater
2011	Captain America: The First Avenger	Joe Johnston	No	Yes	No	No	Composed "Star Spangled Man" with lyrics by David Zippel; score by Alan Silvestri
2011	Jock the Hero Dog	Duncan MacNeillie	No	Yes	No	No	Composed song "Howling at the moon" with lyrics by Tim Rice; score by Klaus Badelt and Ian Honeyman
2012	Mirror Mirror	Tarsem Singh	Yes	No	No	No	
2016	Sausage Party	Conrad Vernon; Greg Tiernan	Yes	Yes	No	No	Co-composer with Christopher Lennertz; Composed song "The Great Beyond" with lyrics by Glenn Slater, Seth Rogen, Evan Goldberg, Ariel Shaffir and Kyle Hunter
2016	Aria for a Cow	Dan Lund	Yes	Yes	No	No	Short film; Composed song "Aria" with lyrics by Howard Ashman
2017	Beauty and the Beast	Bill Condon	Yes	Yes	No	No	Returned from the 1991 animated film Composed original songs with lyrics by Howard Ashman; Composed new songs with Tim Rice
2018	Ralph Breaks the Internet	Rich Moore; Phil Johnston	No	Yes	No	No	Composed songs "In This Place" and "A Place Called Slaughter Race" with lyrics by Phil Johnston & Tom MacDougall; score by Henry Jackman
2018	Holmes & Watson	Etan Cohen	No	Yes	No	No	Composed song "Strange Sensation" with lyrics by Glenn Slater; score by Mark Mothersbaugh
2018	Howard	Don Hahn	Yes	No	No	Yes	Documentary film Disney+ original film Limited theatrical run in 2018; official release in 2020
2019	Aladdin	Guy Ritchie	Yes	Yes	No	No	Returned to score from the 1992 animated film Composed original songs with lyrics by Howard Ashman & Tim Rice; Composed new songs with lyrics by Benj Pasek & Justin Paul
2022	Disenchanted	Adam Shankman	Yes	Yes	No	No	Disney+ original film Returned from the 2007 film Composed songs with lyrics by Stephen Schwartz
2023	The Little Mermaid	Rob Marshall	Yes	Yes	No	No	Returned to score from the 1989 animated film Composed original songs with lyrics by Howard Ashman; Composed new songs with lyrics by Lin-Manuel Miranda
2024	Spellbound	Vicky Jenson	Yes	Yes	Yes	No	Netflix original film Composed songs with lyrics by Glenn Slater

=== Television ===
Year	Title	Credited as					Notes
Year	Title	Composer	Songwriter	Score producer	Executive producer	Actor	Notes
1989–1990	Sesame Street	No	Yes	No	No	No	Composed "Grouchelot", "What is Friend?", "It's Gonna Get Dirty Again," "Snuffle Friends," "Martian Family (Yip Yip Song)," "Monster Up and Down", "Pond Full of Fish" and "Todos un Pueblo"
1989	Polly	No	Yes	No	No	No	Television film Composed song "By Your Side" with lyrics by Jack Feldman; score by Joel McNeely
1990	Cartoon All-Stars to the Rescue	No	Yes	No	No	No	TV special Composed "Wonderful Ways to Say No" with lyrics by Howard Ashman; score by Richard Kosinski, Sam Winans, Paul Buckmaster, Bill Reichenbach, Bob Mann and Guy Moon
1992	Lincoln	Yes	No	No	No	No	Television film
2004	A Christmas Carol	No	Yes	No	No	No	Television film Composed songs with lyrics by Lynn Ahrens; score by Michael Kosarin
2013	The Neighbors	No	Yes	No	No	No	Episode: "Sing Like a Larry Bird"; Composed "More or Less The Kind of Thing You May or May Not Possibly See on Broadway", "Giselle", "More or Less The Kind of Thing You May or May Not Possibly See on Broadway" (Reprise)
2015–2016	Galavant	Yes	Yes	Yes	Yes	No	Composed complete soundtrack, score co-composed with Christopher Lennertz
2017	Tangled: Before Ever After	No	Yes	No	No	No	Television film Disney Channel original film Composed songs with lyrics by Glenn Slater; score by Kevin Kliesch
2017–2020	Rapunzel's Tangled Adventure	Yes	Yes	No	No	No	Composed complete soundtrack, score composed by Kevin Kliesch
2019	The Little Mermaid Live!	Yes	Yes	No	No	No	TV special Composed original songs with lyrics by Howard Ashman; Composed new songs with lyrics by Glenn Slater
2020	Central Park	No	Yes	No	No	No	Episode: "Dog Spray Afternoon"; Composed song "Spoiler Alert" with lyrics by Glenn Slater
2021	The Falcon and the Winter Soldier	No	Yes	No	No	No	Episode: "The Star-Spangled Man"; Composed "Star Spangled Man" with lyrics by David Zippel for Captain America: The First Avenger; score by Henry Jackman
2022	Beauty and the Beast: A 30th Celebration	Yes	Yes	No	No	Yes	TV special Composed original songs with lyrics by Howard Ashman; Composed "Evermore" with lyrics by Tim Rice
2024–present	Sausage Party: Foodtopia	No	No	Yes	No	No	"The Great Beyond Score Theme" several episodes

=== Theater ===
- Dear Worthy Editor (Off-Broadway, c. 1974)
  Book by Judy Menken
  Based on the letters-to-the-editor of Jewish-American newspaper Daily Jewish Forward
- Kurt Vonnegut's God Bless You, Mr. Rosewater (Off-Broadway, 1979)
  Lyrics by Howard Ashman and Dennis Green
  Book by Ashman
  Based on a 1965 novel by Kurt Vonnegut
- The Dream on Royal Street (Regional, 1981)
  Lyrics by David Rogers
  Book by June Walker Rogers
  Based on Shakespeare's A Midsummer Night's Dream
- Little Shop of Horrors (Off-Broadway, 1982; West End, 1983; Broadway, 2003)
  Book and Lyrics by Ashman
  Based on the 1960 Filmgroup film
- Weird Romance (Off-Broadway, 1992)
  Lyrics by David Spencer
  Book by Alan Brennert and Spencer
  Two one-act musical: Based on "Her Pilgrim Soul" and "The Girl Who Was Plugged In"
- Beauty and the Beast (Broadway, 1994; West End, 1997)
  Lyrics by Ashman and Tim Rice
  Book by Linda Woolverton
  Based on the 1991 Disney animated film and the 1740 novelist by Gabrielle-Suzanne Barbot de Villeneuve
- A Christmas Carol (Madison Square Garden, 1994–2003)
  Lyrics by Lynn Ahrens
  Book by Mike Ockrent and Ahrens
  Based on 1843 novella by Charles Dickens
- King David (Broadway, 1997)
  Book and Lyrics by Rice
  Based on the Biblical books of "Samuel", "1 Chronicles" and "Psalms"
- The Hunchback of Notre Dame (Berlin, 1999; La Jolla Playhouse, 2014)
  Lyrics by Stephen Schwartz
  Book by James Lapine and Peter Parnell
  Based on the 1996 Disney animated film and the 1831 novel by Victor Hugo
- The Little Mermaid (Broadway, 2008)
  Lyrics by Ashman and Glenn Slater
  Book by Doug Wright
  Based on the 1989 Disney animated film and the 1837 fairy tale by Hans Christian Andersen
- Sister Act (West End, 2009; Broadway, 2011)
  Lyrics by Slater
  Book by Cheri Steinkellner and Bill Steinkellner
  Based on the 1992 Touchstone film
- Leap of Faith (Broadway, 2012)
  Lyrics by Slater
  Book by Janus Cercone and Warren Leight
  Based on the 1992 Paramount film
- Newsies (Paper Mill Playhouse, 2011; Broadway, 2012)
  Lyrics by Jack Feldman
  Book by Harvey Fierstein
  Based on the 1992 Disney film
- Aladdin (Seattle, 2011; Broadway, 2014)
  Lyric by Ashman, Rice and Chad Beguelin
  Book by Beguelin
  Based on the 1992 Disney animated film and the folk tale from "One Thousand and One Nights"
- The Apprenticeship of Duddy Kravitz (Montreal, 2015)
  Book and Lyrics by Spencer
  Based on the 1959 novel by Mordecai Richler
- A Bronx Tale: The Musical (Broadway, 2016)
  Lyrics by Slater
  Book by Chazz Palminteri
  Based on the 1990 autobiographical one-man play by Palminteri
- Hercules (Central Park, 2019; West End, 2025)
  Lyrics by David Zippel
  Book by Kristoffer Diaz, Robert Horn and Kwame Kwei-Armah
  Based on the 1997 Disney animated film and the legendary hero "Heracles"

=== Other ===
- Aladdin, Jr. – 1-act, 7-scene musical adapted from the animated film Aladdin 1992
- Beauty and the Beast Live on Stage – Theatrical show at Disney's Hollywood Studios, Walt Disney World
- Disney's Aladdin: A Musical Spectacular – Theatrical show at Disney California Adventure
- The Hunchback of Notre Dame – Theatrical show at Disney's MGM Studios, Walt Disney World
- The Little Mermaid: Ariel's Undersea Adventure – Attraction at Disney California Adventure
- Sindbad's Storybook Voyage featuring "Compass of Your Heart" – Attraction at Tokyo DisneySea, Tokyo Disney Resort
- Dramatists Guild of America YouTube Channel music video featuring "Someone Wrote That Song"
- Tangled: The Musical – Theatrical show on the Disney Cruise Line (starting November 2015)
- Dubai Parks and Resorts's official theme song "All the Wonders of the Universe" (opening October 2016)
- Boston Pops Fireworks Spectacular 2017 celebration featuring the world premiere of "The Sum of Us" (lyrics by Jack Feldman) for soloist, chorus, and orchestra (Brian Stokes Mitchell, U.S. Army Soldier's Chorus and the Boston Pops Orchestra)

== Awards and nominations ==
Alan Menken has received eight Academy Awards (and nineteen nominations), becoming the second most prolific Oscar winner in the music categories after Alfred Newman (who has 9 Oscars), eleven Grammy Awards (and twenty-four nominations), one Tony Award (and four nominations), and one Daytime Emmy Award. He has also received seven Golden Globe Awards (and sixteen nominations), one Drama Desk Award (and five nominations), and three Outer Critics Circle Awards. Four of Menken's songs have won both the Academy Award for Best Original Song and a Grammy Award in a songwriting category (either Song of the Year or Best Song Written Specifically for a Motion Picture or for Television).

He was made a Disney Legend in 2002 and was the recipient of a Richard Kirk Career Achievement Award in 1998, a Freddie G. Award for Musical Excellence in 2013, and The Oscar Hammerstein Award in 2013, among others.

The American Film Institute included the title song from the film Beauty and the Beast, in the AFI's 100 Years...100 Songs. Five other songs from his Disney films were nominated:

- "Under the Sea" from The Little Mermaid (1989)
- "Be Our Guest" from Beauty and the Beast (1991)
- "Belle" from Beauty and the Beast (1991)
- "A Whole New World" from Aladdin (1992)
- "Friend Like Me" from Aladdin (1992)

In 2006, AFI listed its 25 greatest movie musicals, with Beauty and the Beast (1991) ranked 22nd. It is the only animated musical film on the list. Four of his other film musicals were also nominated:

- Little Shop of Horrors (1986)
- The Little Mermaid (1989)
- Aladdin (1992)
- The Hunchback of Notre Dame (1996)

In 2019, Menken finally accepted the Razzie Award for Worst Original Song he won at the 13th Golden Raspberry Awards (1993) for "High Times, Hard Times" from Newsies (1992), becoming the first person to win a Razzie and Oscar in the same year. Menken wrote the music for the song, and shared the award with lyricist Jack Feldman.

In 2020, Menken reached EGOT status when he won the Daytime Emmy Award for Outstanding Original Song in a Children's, Young Adult or Animated Program for co-writing the song "Waiting in the Wings" for Rapunzel's Tangled Adventure.
