= Glenn Slater =

American lyricist (born 1968)

- Born: January 28, 1968 (age 58); Brooklyn, New York, U.S.
- Education: Harvard University (1990)
- Occupation: Lyricist
- Spouse: Wendy Leigh Wilf
- Children: 2

Glenn Slater (born January 28, 1968) is an American lyricist for musical theatre. He is a frequent collaborator with Alan Menken, Christopher Lennertz, and Andrew Lloyd Webber, among other composers. He was nominated for three Tony Awards for Best Original Score for the Broadway versions of The Little Mermaid in 2008, Sister Act in 2011, & School of Rock in 2016.

== Early life ==
Slater was born in Brooklyn, New York. He is Jewish. Raised in East Brunswick, New Jersey, he graduated from East Brunswick High School as part of the class of 1986; he became interested in drama while at high school after an unsuccessful effort as a songwriter with a band. In 1990, he graduated from Harvard University where he composed Hasty Pudding Theatricals' 141st production, Whiskey Business. He has received the ASCAP Foundation's Richard Rodgers New Horizon Award with composer Stephen Weiner.

== Career ==
Slater wrote the lyrics for the Off-Broadway stage revue Newyorkers produced by the Manhattan Theatre Club in 2001. He has written lyrics for six editions of Ringling Brothers & Barnum and Bailey Circus.

His first work with Alan Menken was writing the lyrics for the film Home on the Range in 2004 and the stage production Sister Act the Musical (2006).

He wrote the lyrics for the songs newly composed for the stage adaptation of Disney's The Little Mermaid (2008), replacing the animated film's original lyricist Howard Ashman, who died in 1991. He also worked with Menken on the new musical version of Leap of Faith.

Slater and his wife, Wendy Leigh Wilf, wrote the book, music and lyrics to a new musical Beatsville that received a production at the 2008 NAMT Festival of New Musicals, in New York. It is based on the 1959 Roger Corman film A Bucket of Blood.

He has also composed the lyrics and co-wrote the book for the major Andrew Lloyd Webber musical Love Never Dies, which is a sequel to Lloyd Webber's 1986 musical The Phantom of the Opera. The show premiered in the West End in March 2010.

Adding to his career as a lyricist, Slater wrote the lyrics for the songs in Disney's 50th animated feature Tangled. In 2015 he worked again with Andrew Lloyd Webber for the Broadway musical School of Rock and continued his working relationship with Alan Menken writing lyrics for the musical A Bronx Tale and the songs of Galavant on ABC.

Slater attended the BMI Musical Theatre Workshop and was a resident writer with Musical Theatreworks.

== Awards and honors ==
Slater has received the Kleban Award for Lyrics, the ASCAP Foundation Richard Rodgers New Horizons Award and the Jonathan Larson Award.

He was nominated for the 2008 Tony Award for Best Original Score for The Little Mermaid and received his second nomination for this award in 2011 for Sister Act. He received his third nomination for this award in 2016 for School of Rock.

He won a Grammy Award in 2012 for Best Song Written for Visual Media for the song "I See The Light" from the animated movie Tangled. He was nominated for an Oscar for Best Original Song for that song. In July 2020, Slater won a Daytime Emmy Award for Original Song in a Children's, Young Adult or Animated Program for the song "Waiting in the Wings" from Rapunzel's Tangled Adventure.

In 2021, Menken and Slater were unsuccessfully nominated for a Daytime Emmy for the song "Nothing Left to Lose" from Rapunzel's Tangled Adventure.

== Personal life ==
Slater lives in New York City with his wife, Wendy Leigh Wilf, and two sons, Benjamin and Daniel. He is a supporter of the Premier League club Tottenham Hotspur.
