= Tangled (franchise) =

Disney franchise starting with a 2010 animated film

- Created by: Dan Fogelman
- Original work: Tangled (2010)
- Owner: The Walt Disney Company
- Years: 2010–present
- Based on: Rapunzel by the Brothers Grimm

Films and television
- Film(s): Tangled (2010); Tangled (2028)
- Short film(s): Tangled Ever After (2012)
- Animated series: Rapunzel's Tangled Adventure (2017–2020)
- Television film(s): Tangled: Before Ever After (2017)

Theatrical presentations
- Musical(s): Tangled: The Musical

Games
- Video game(s): Tangled: The Video Game (2010); Disney Infinity (2013)^{*}; Kingdom Hearts III (2019)^{*}

Audio
- Soundtrack(s): Tangled (Original Motion Picture Soundtrack) (2010)
- Original music: "When Will My Life Begin?"; "Mother Knows Best"; "I've Got a Dream"; "I See the Light"
- ^{*} Work where this franchise's characters or settings appeared as part of a crossover.

Tangled is a media franchise owned by The Walt Disney Company that began with the 2010 American CGI-animated film of the same name, directed by Nathan Greno and Byron Howard from a screenplay by Dan Fogelman. Produced by Roy Conli, the film featured songs by Alan Menken and Glenn Slater, while Glen Keane, John Lasseter, and Aimee Scribner served as its executive producers. The film was loosely based on the German fairy tale "Rapunzel" from the 1812 collection Grimms' Fairy Tales by the Brothers Grimm.

The franchise consists of a feature film, a video game, a short sequel, a stage musical, and a television series, as well as a television film.

== Films ==
Film	Release date	Director(s)	Screenwriter(s)	Producer(s)
Animated
Tangled	November 24, 2010	Nathan Greno & Byron Howard	Dan Fogelman	Roy Conli
Live-action
Tangled	March 31, 2028	Michael Gracey	Jennifer Kaytin Robinson & Michael Montemayor	Kristin Burr & Michael De Luca

=== Animated ===
==== Tangled (2010) ====
Tangled is a 2010 American CGI-animated musical adventure fantasy comedy film produced by Walt Disney Animation Studios and released by Walt Disney Pictures. It is loosely based on the German fairy tale "Rapunzel" from the 1812 collection Grimms' Fairy Tales by the Brothers Grimm. Featuring the voices of Mandy Moore and Zachary Levi, the film tells the story of a lost, young princess with long magical hair who yearns to leave her secluded tower. Against her mother's wishes, she accepts the aid of a handsome intruder to take her out into the world which she has never seen. Composer Alan Menken, who had worked on prior Disney animated features, returned to score Tangled.

=== Live-Action ===
==== Tangled (upcoming 2028 film) ====
In January 2026, Disney announced the casting of Teagan Croft as Rapunzel, and Milo Manheim as Eugene. Kathryn Hahn will play the role of Mother Gothel in the film. Production for the film will take place in Spain in June 2026, with Michael Gracey as director. It is scheduled to be released to be released on March 31, 2028.

== Short film ==
=== Tangled Ever After ===
Disney released a short sequel named Tangled Ever After in theaters in early 2012. The plot revolves around Rapunzel and Eugene's wedding day and about Pascal and Maximus losing the wedding rings and bringing them back.

== Television ==
=== TV film ===
The television sequel Tangled: Before Ever After, set between the events of Tangled and Tangled Ever After, was released on March 10, 2017. Tangled: Before Ever After doubled as a pilot for Rapunzel's Tangled Adventure.

=== Rapunzel's Tangled Adventure (2017 TV series) ===
A television series based on the film premiered on Disney Channel on March 24, 2017, entitled Rapunzel's Tangled Adventure. The series takes place between the events of original film and the 2012 short Tangled Ever After, with Mandy Moore and Zachary Levi reprising their roles.

== Cancelled comic book spin-off ==
Shortly following the series finale of Rapunzel's Tangled Adventure, series' storyboard artist Kaitlyn Ritter revealed that she and Anna Lencioni had pitched an idea for a spin-off comic book focusing on Varian titled Varian and the Seven Kingdoms. The series saw Varian learning that his mother, Ulla, was an alchemist and sets out on a journey to search for her after discovering her almanac. He teams up with three other young heroes named Princess Nuru, Yong and Hugo to learn the seven alchemical stages of transformation and collect a totem for each so as to be reunited with his mother while also evading her former partner Donella who wants the totems for herself. Varian would have also encountered his long lost cousins who shared his scientific fascinations. Storylines would have revolved around Hugo being a hired agent of Donella who later turns on her and Ulla revealed to be the villain of the series with Varian trying to turn her good based on his own personal experience. According to Ritter, while Disney was enthusiastic with the project and even received support and encouragement, they ultimately passed as they felt that a series that focused on a Rapunzel-related character without Rapunzel would be risky. Disney even suggested changing Varian to a completely original character so as to be an original brand, but Ritter and Lencioni refused.

== Musical ==
Tangled the Musical
- Stage musical logo
- Music: Alan Menken
- Lyrics: Glenn Slater
- Book: Glenn Slater
- Basis: Tangled by Dan Fogelman
- Premiere: November 11, 2015: Disney Magic

A stage musical adaptation of the film premiered on board the Disney Magic of the Disney Cruise Line on November 11, 2015, featuring three new songs by Menken and Slater. The show is one hour long, forty minutes shorter than the movie. The new songs are "Flower of Gold" (about the flower), "Wanted Man" (Eugene's backstory), and "When She Returns" during the festival.

== Music ==
- Tangled (2010)
- Tangled: The Series (2018)
- Rapunzel's Tangled Adventure (2019)
- Rapunzel's Tangled Adventure: Plus Est En Vous (2020)

== Video games ==
Tangled: The Video Game, a video game based on the film was released on November 23, 2010, for two Nintendo consoles, Nintendo DS and Wii, as well as for the PC platform by Disney Interactive Studios.

The figure of Rapunzel is available for the Disney Infinity video game series, and is compatible with all three editions.

Rapunzel, Flynn, Maximus, Mother Gothel, and Pascal are playable characters in the video game Disney Magic Kingdoms.

A world based on Tangled, "Kingdom of Corona", made its debut in the Kingdom Hearts series in the game, Kingdom Hearts III.

Mother Gothel, Rapunzel and Flynn Rider are characters that appear in Disney Dreamlight Valley, along with items based on the film.

== Books ==
In 2017, Leila Howland wrote Rapunzel and the Lost Lagoon, published by Disney and Random House, which ties into the then-ongoing Disney Channel animated series, featuring Rapunzel and series-original character Cassandra on an adventure in the early days of the series. In 2018, Howland wrote another book tying into the animated series, Rapunzel and the Vanishing Village, focusing on Rapunzel's relationship with Eugene during the second season of the show. In 2026, Margaret Owen wrote Rootbound, a novel tying into the movie and offering an alternate sequel than the animated series, published by Disney and Random House. It is set a month after the film and has Rapunzel and Eugene travel to the long-isolated kingdom of Astera.

== Cast and characters ==
Key

- A dark gray cell indicates the character was not in the film.
- A ^{Y} indicates an actor or actress who portrayed a younger version of their character.

Characters	Film	Short film	Television film	Television series			Live-action film
Characters	Tangled	Tangled Ever After	Tangled: Before Ever After	Tangled: The Series	Rapunzel's Tangled Adventure		Tangled
Characters	Tangled	Tangled Ever After	Tangled: Before Ever After	Season 1	Season 2	Season 3	Tangled
Rapunzel	Mandy Moore	Mandy Moore	Mandy Moore	Mandy Moore	Mandy Moore	Mandy Moore	Teagan Croft
Rapunzel	Delaney Rose Stein^{Y}	Mandy Moore	Mandy Moore	Ivy George^{Y}	Mandy Moore	Mandy Moore	Teagan Croft
Eugene Fitzherbert Flynn Rider	Zachary Levi	Zachary Levi	Zachary Levi	Zachary Levi	Zachary Levi	Zachary Levi	Milo Manheim
Eugene Fitzherbert Flynn Rider	Zachary Levi	Zachary Levi	Zachary Levi	Zachary Levi	Zachary Levi	Sean Giambrone^{Y}	Milo Manheim
Mother Gothel	Donna Murphy		Photograph	Donna Murphy	Donna Murphy	Donna Murphy	Kathryn Hahn
Queen Arianna	Silent role	Kari Wahlgren	Julie Bowen	Julie Bowen	Julie Bowen	Julie Bowen	Caitríona Balfe
King Frederic	Silent role	Silent role	Clancy Brown	Clancy Brown	Clancy Brown	Clancy Brown	Elliot Cowan
Pascal	Uncredited voice	Uncredited voice	Dee Bradley Baker	Dee Bradley Baker	Dee Bradley Baker	Dee Bradley Baker	TBA
Maximus	Uncredited voice	Nathan Greno	Dee Bradley Baker	Dee Bradley Baker	Dee Bradley Baker	Dee Bradley Baker	TBA
Captain of the Guards	M. C. Gainey		M. C. Gainey	M. C. Gainey		M. C. Gainey	TBA
Sideburns Stabbington	Ron Perlman	Nathan Greno		Ron Perlman	Ron Perlman	Ron Perlman	Patrick McPherson
Sideburns Stabbington	Ron Perlman	Nathan Greno		Ron Perlman	Ron Perlman	Brian Hull^{Y}	Patrick McPherson
Patchy Stabbington	Ron Perlman	Nathan Greno		Ron Perlman	Ron Perlman	Ron Perlman	Hugo McPherson
Cassandra			Eden Espinosa	Eden Espinosa	Eden Espinosa	Eden Espinosa	
Lance Strongbow				James Monroe Iglehart	James Monroe Iglehart	James Monroe Iglehart	
Varian				Jeremy Jordan	Jeremy Jordan	Jeremy Jordan	
Hawthorne							Diego Luna

== Crew ==
Role	Animated film	Live-action remake
Role	Tangled	Tangled
Director(s)	Nathan Greno; Byron Howard	Michael Gracey
Producer(s)	Roy Conli	Kristin Burr; Michael De Luca
Writer(s)	Dan Fogelman	Jennifer Kaytin Robinson; Michael Montemayor
Executive Producer(s)	John Lasseter; Glen Keane	Lucy Kitada; Jessica Virtue
Composer	Alan Menken	Alan Menken
Songwriters	Alan Menken; Glenn Slater	Alan Menken; Glenn Slater
Editor(s)	Tim Mertens	TBA
Studio(s)	Walt Disney Animation Studios	Walt Disney Pictures; Burr! Productions
Distributor	Walt Disney Studios Motion Pictures	Walt Disney Studios Motion Pictures
