= Rapunzel's Tangled Adventure season 3 =

Season of Rapunzel's Tangled Adventure

Rapunzel's Tangled Adventure
- Season 3
- Promotional poster
- No. of episodes: 17

Release
- Original network: Disney Channel
- Original release: October 7, 2019 – March 1, 2020

Season chronology
- ← Previous; Season 2

The third and final season of Rapunzel's Tangled Adventure premiered on October 7, 2019, and concluded on March 1, 2020.

== Episodes ==
No. overall	No. in season	Title	Directed by	Written by	Storyboard by	Original release date	Prod. code	U.S. viewers (millions)
44	1	"Rapunzel's Return"	Tom Caulfield & Shane Zalvin	Ricky Roxburgh	Isabelle Gedigk, Diana Kidlaeid, Todd Kurosawa, Anna Lencioni, Kaitlyn Ritter, Wendy Sullivan and Kataneh Vahdani	October 7, 2019	301-302	0.29
Inside the House of Yesterday's Tomorrow (as seen off-screen in "Rapunzeltopia"), Cassandra is greeted by the Enchanted Girl, a spirit who reveals that Cassandra is the biological daughter of Mother Gothel, who abandoned her on the night she kidnapped infant Rapunzel. Enraged that Rapunzel has been (unknowingly) overshadowing her for the entirety of her life, and that she will always be unfairly overlooked, Cassandra snatches the Moonstone Opal, absorbs it, and declared Rapunzel's destiny as her own. She manages to escape from the group and cuts all ties with them, with Rapunzel unable to wrap her head around the entire situation. The group returns to Corona and find that it has been taken over by Varian, who has aligned himself with Andrew and the Separatists of Saporia to erase the King and Queen's memories and enslave Corona's citizens. Rapunzel is captured when she tries to stop the invaders on her own and Varian reveals he regrets his previous actions against Corona and plans to wipe the memories of everyone in Corona so he can start over. However, when Varian realizes that the Separatists plan on using one of his potions' destructive properties to destroy Corona instead, he and Rapunzel work together to stop it. They succeed, and Rapunzel uses the decaying incantation to release Quirin from his amber prison, mending her friendship with Varian. Rapunzel becomes Corona's interim ruler until her parents' memories can be restored, and finally begins to open up about Cassandra to Eugene.
45	2	"Return of the King"	Philip Pignotti	Jeremy Shipp	Adrian Barrios, Eric Elrod, James Fuji, Diana Kidlaeid and Jenessa Warren	October 8, 2019	303	0.34
King Edmund arrives in Corona to see his long-lost son, Eugene, and to give him the royal sash of their bloodline. Eugene wants nothing to do with him, but Rapunzel invites him to stay. Later, the sash is stolen and a ransom note is left behind. Edmund and Eugene decide to go and retrieve it. Their quest begins to feel more like an outing and King Edmund reveals that Eugene's given name is Horace, much to Eugene's annoyance. Meanwhile, the Stabbington Brothers plot revenge on Eugene as they are both viewed as a joke by the other criminals because of their previous defeats. They manage to locate him through the royal guards and Rapunzel takes off to save him and Edmund. Eugene and Edmund manage to fight off the Stabbington brothers, but then Eugene discovers that Edmund took the sash himself so that they could bond.The Stabbingtons abduct King Edmund, and Eugene, and Rapunzel rescue him from a log flume. The royal sash gets destroyed in the attempt, but King Edmund, with help from Xavier, creates a new one for Eugene and they make up. Elsewhere, Cassandra is struggling to use her newfound Moonstone powers when she begins to hear the Enchanted Girl calling her name once again.
46	3	"Who's Afraid of the Big, Bad Wolf?"	Shane Zalvin	Story by : Kelly Hannon and Jase Ricci; Written by : Jase Ricci	Jerry Yu Ching and Antony Mazzotta	October 9, 2019	304	0.24
Rapunzel helps rebuild Old Corona, now the permanent home of Red and Angry, who've returned to settle down. Mysterious footprints and livestock behavior signal a werewolf threat. They meet monster hunter Creighton, who reveals a werewolf possessed a citizen. Rapunzel believes it's Monty, but it's Red. Red's actions were driven by her desire to explain her reluctance to settle down to Angry. They try to remove the spirit, but Creighton attacks Red. Angry calms her down, and she returns to normal. Meanwhile, Cassandra grapples with her connection to the Moonstone and its destructive powers, guided by the Enchanted Girl. Cassandra taps into her darkest emotions, fueled by anger at Rapunzel, unlocking the Moonstone's potential, affecting the Opal and Black Rocks.: Angry and Red's real names are revealed to be "Kiera" and "Catalina".
47	4	"The Lost Treasure of Herz Der Sonne"	Tom Caulfield	Dave Schiff	Sam Hood, Kaitlyn Ritter and Wendy Sullivan	October 10, 2019	305	0.30
Rapunzel tries to unite the kingdom by refurbishing the throne room but encounters constant bickering due to their differences. During the renovation, they discover a map to the Lost Treasure of Herz Der Sonne. Rapunzel organizes a race to find it in pairs, but her partner Feldspar secretly brings a map copy, hindering their progress. Other teams face their own challenges: Pete wants to impress Catalina, Varian endures Xavier's long stories, Kiera teaches Stan to be devious, Ruddiger's schemes backfire, and Eugene and Lance join the race casually. Feldspar reveals he can read the map in Saporian and warns of a curse. Rapunzel and Feldspar reach the treasure, angering the others. When Eugene accidentally opens the treasure, mummies attack. Rapunzel unites the group to defeat them, putting the treasure back. The adventure brings them closer, except for Old Lady Crowley, left in a thorn patch during the race. NOTE: This episode is a parody of the film It's a Mad, Mad, Mad, Mad World
48	5	"No Time Like the Past"	Philip Pignotti	Kelly Hannon	Todd Kurosawa and Anna Lencioni	October 11, 2019	306	0.31
While going over all the things she got done in the morning, Rapunzel discovers Old Lady Crowley tossing out Cassandra's things. Rapunzel is upset and demands that they be left alone. She has Lance and Eugene help her save all of Cassandra's mementos and personal belongings, but she becomes saddened when Eugene reminds her that Cassandra turned her back on "her". Rapunzel takes a box of her things along with, unknowingly, a mysterious hourglass. As she examines it, she accidentally drops and smashes it and she and Pascal find themselves sent back into the past. They run into a teenage Eugene and Lance who keep calling Rapunzel "Sideburns". Rapunzel realizes that she and Pascal have inhabited the bodies of the Stabbington Brothers and decide to recruit the young thieves in getting the hourglass from the castle back. Throughout the quest, Rapunzel realizes that Eugene has no loyalty to anyone, including Lance which upsets her. After Lance gets captured, Rapunzel talks some sense into Eugene and they go back and rescue him. Rapunzel and Pascal return to the present and she discovers that Eugene has been saving all of Cassandra's things, remembering Rapunzel's advice and knowing she would still want to be loyal to her friend. Note: YouTube voice impressionist [[[Brian Hull]] guest stars.
49	6	"Beginnings"	Shane Zalvin	Leanna Dindal	Sam Hood, Diana Kidlaeid and Jenessa Warren	October 15, 2019	307	0.16
Rapunzel is struggling to choose a new lady-in-waiting, with Eugene suspecting it's related to her unresolved feelings for Cassandra. Two years earlier, Rapunzel attempts to befriend Cassandra during the Contest of Crowns, a competition among seven kingdoms. After initial mishaps, Cassandra gets an offer to join the royal guard of Ingvarr, but they must win the final competition. Rapunzel's behavior nearly sabotages Cassandra's chances, leading to a heated argument. However, as they bond during the competition, their friendship grows. In the present, Rapunzel confides in Eugene about her continued thoughts of Cassandra and her desire to reconcile. Meanwhile, at a caravan, Cassandra learns from the Enchanted Girl that part of the moonstone's power now resides in Rapunzel's indestructible hair due to their past interactions. Frustrated with Rapunzel's influence, Cassandra tears up a painting of their former friendship.
50	7	"The King and Queen of Hearts"	Tom Caulfield	Ricky Roxburgh	Jerry Yu Ching and Antony Mazzotta	October 16, 2019	308	0.23
Rapunzel continues to try and restore the memories of her parents, King Frederic and Queen Arianna, and hopes to use the journal of Herz Der Sonne to remind them, but they do not understand the significance. Arianna still lusts for adventure, while Frederic cannot get over his obsession of egg collecting. Rapunzel recruits her friends to try and set up the perfect date for them and while they cannot find anything in common personality wise, they share a mutual love for Rapunzel and begins to bond again. However, King Trevor arrives with the intent to woo Arianna using an ocean crystal he found. Despite Rapunzel's attempts to keep him away, he manages to convince Arianna to join him in watching the sea serpents. Rapunzel realizes that the ocean is lawless and Trevor will attempt to marry Arianna out there. Rapunzel and her friends manage to catch up, but Trevor sends his "navy seal team" to attack them. Arianna fights back and tries to rescue Rapunzel, Frederic and their friends from a sea serpent. Eventually, Frederic realizes that the ocean crystal is, in fact, a sea serpent egg and gives it back. Trevor, who gives up after seeing how much Frederic and Arianna care for each other, gives back the journal that he stole, but it is water logged. Rapunzel makes a new journal that she and Eugene sign and Frederic and Arianna both begin to remember their lives when they were young.
51	8	"Day of the Animals"	Tom Caulfield	Kelly Hannon	Adrian Barrios, David Prince and Jenessa Warren	October 17, 2019	309	0.23
Rapunzel, Varian, Kiera (Angry) and Catalina (Red) are returning stolen loot that the two girls had stolen years ago. They are accompanied by Max, Pascal, Ruddiger and Hamuel who all cannot stop quarreling with each other (or in Hamuel's case, just being useless). While messing with a sea shell pendant, it magically transports the humans into it, leaving the animals to fight over it. A minor thug named Dwayne, steals the pendant forcing the animals to work together to retrieve it. Eventually, Dwayne gets captured by a buzzard and the animals finally work together to get the pendant back. They drop it in the ocean, the only solution that Rapunzel discovers, and the four are released from it and reunite with the animals who now have a better and stronger relationship.
52	9	"Be Very Afraid!"	Philip Pignotti	Jeremy Shipp	Kaitlyn Ritter and Wendy Sullivan	October 18, 2019	311	0.33
When the Enchanted Girl tells Cassandra she must destroy Rapunzel in order to wield the Moonstone's true power, Cassandra discovers that she can create, with fear, red rock spikes that cause fear and freeze their victims. Varian discovers the red rocks and teams up with Rapunzel to use his amber solution on them. Meanwhile, Eugene and Lance decide to throw a talent show to distract everyone from their fears. Though initially a failure, it succeeds when Lance faces his fear of singing in public and encourages everyone to face their own fears. Rapunzel and Varian make their way to the Demanitus chamber. Varian, who is haunted by the memory of what the amber did to his father, can not bring himself to use the solution. Rapunzel, who has been hiding her fear, reveals that she is afraid of losing Cassandra as a friend and of her destroying Corona. At the last second, Varian tackles his fears and encases the rocks in amber, saving Corona, and people begin to respect him again. The Enchanted Girl tells Cassandra that Rapunzel will take all her newfound power and destroy her, and convinces Cassandra to kill her former friend. Rapunzel, who sensed Cassandra's fear through the rocks, tells Eugene that there is still a chance to save her.: Catalina (Red) briefly transforms into her werewolf form at the start of her and Kiera’s (Angry) portion of the show, unintentionally scaring the audience.
53	10	"Pascal's Dragon"	Shane Zalvin	Dave Schiff	Todd Kurosawa, Anna Lencioni and Dave Prince	January 12, 2020	310	0.27
Pascal discovers a pearl that later turns out to be a dragon's egg. The egg hatches and the dragon immediately takes to Pascal. The very next day, the dragon has grown and is very dog like. Nigel the adviser becomes suspicious and learns the egg's origin and warns Rapunzel that they must destroy the dragon once it is found. Rapunzel ends up finding Pascal and the dragon and names him Little Big Guy. Together with Eugene, they sneak Little Big Guy out of the castle where he begins picking up many of Pascal's abilities. In return, he grants Pascal some of his own. They accidentally start a fire and Nigel reveals that he found a baby dragon as a child and his village was destroyed by the dragon's family. Since then, he has viewed all dragons as dangerous. Little Big Guy becomes bigger. Rapunzel and Eugene find him and Pascal and discover he is trying to reconnect with his kind. Nigel attempts to knock out Little Big Guy, but he manages to escape and fly. Seeing Little Big Guy bids goodbye to Pascal, Nigel gives up out of sympathy. Rapunzel paints a mural of Pascal and Little Big Guy to cheer Pascal up.
54	11	"Islands Apart"	Philip Pignotti	Leanna Dindal	Jerry Yu Ching, Ben Choi and Antony Mazzotta	January 19, 2020	312	0.30
With an implication from Owl, Rapunzel and Eugene board a hot-air balloon and return to Tirapi Island, where the Lorbs dwell, in the hope of finding Cassandra. However, they instead meet up with the Captain of the Royal Guards who has been looking for Rapunzel for months but decided to remain on the island with the Lorbs. He then introduces them to a four-year-old Cassandra, who appears to be enjoying being with her adoptive father. From their Lorb leader friend, Rapunzel and Eugene learn of a mystical fountain which grants the wishes of those who drop a Lorb coin into it, but on the ninth day, darkness shall descend onto the wisher. Eugene and Rapunzel try to warn the Captain, but he refuses to listen as he desires to have his daughter back. He reveals he found Cassandra during his search, but strongly believes that the furious woman he had encountered is not his daughter. The wish's darkness arrives, causing hundreds of different Cassandras suddenly attack. The Captain attempts to flee in the balloon with the four-year-old Cassandra but upon seeing she has no shadow, he comes to his senses and removes the coin from the mystic fountain which, in turn, makes all the Cassandras vanish. And so Rapunzel, Eugene and the Captain return to Corona, determined never to give up on the real Cassandra. Meanwhile, a now pale Cassandra and the Enchanted Girl travel to the remains of the Great Tree. The Enchanted Girl tells her that the incantations within were their only hope of unlocking the powers of the ancient Moonstone; aside from the ancient Demanitus scroll. With this information, Cassandra decides that their next stop is Corona.
55	12	"Cassandra's Revenge"	Tom Caulfield & Shane Zalvin	Ricky Roxburgh	Anna Lencioni, Kaitlyn Ritter, Wendy Sullivan and Kuni Tomita	January 26, 2020	313–314	0.35
Rapunzel is preparing for Eugene's real birthday while secretly planning to propose to him, unaware that Eugene plans to do the same thing. Cassandra appears during the party with an ultimatum for the Demanitus scroll or she will destroy Corona, Rapunzel revealed that she gave it to Varian so he can translate three incantations while revealing a fourth unknown incantation. Cassandra kidnaps Varian when he destroyed the translations, using Varian's truth serum to teach her the third incantation to control the black rocks. Cassandra uses the spell to turn the ruins of Gothel's tower into a fortress to attract Rapunzel's attention. Varian tries to reason with Cassandra from his past experience as villain that she’ll lose everything if she continues on a dark path as she refuses to listen and has him imprisoned. The group attempt to enter before Cassandra allows them at the Enchanted Girl's request. The Enchanted Girl visits Varian in a dream and gives a hint on how to discover the fourth incantation; by holding the scroll against the sun. Varian manages to find the fourth incantation, the scroll is burned away in the process. While Eugene rescues Varian, Rapunzel and Cassandra face off with one another. Varian gives Rapunzel the new fourth incantation which the Enchanted Girl was counting on, the clash of energies ending with Cassandra knocked off the crumbling tower as a fragment of the Moonstone chipped off. The heroes return home with Rapunzel and Eugene promising to hold off their proposal until they save their former friend. Cassandra recovers from her defeat as the Enchanted Girl, revealed to be Zhan Tiri and having orchestrated the clash between the Sundrop and Moonstone's energies, is finally freed from her prison.
56	13	"Race to the Spire"	Philip Pignotti	Jeremy Shipp	Adrian Barrios, Isabelle Gedigk and Jenessa Warren	February 2, 2020	315	0.33
Cassandra returns to the Spire to steal the Mind Trap, a device that can control anyone who has sworn loyalty to the Moonstone, from Calliope. Calliope sends a letter to Rapunzel for help and she and Eugene set out by hot air balloon. They pass through the frozen tundra of Krestin Lock where they are shot down and reunite with Calliope who claims to have escaped. They battle their way through the fish like natives, but Rapunzel rescues a couple as they leave. They arrive at the Spire where "Calliope" asks for the key to unlock the chest containing the Mind Trap, but Rapunzel sees through the ruse; Cassandra reveals herself and "Calliope" is Zhan Tiri in disguise. They fight over the Mind Trap Stone, but when Zhan Tiri takes advantage of Rapunzel's compassion by threatening Calliope again and forcing Rapunzel gives the Mind Trap to Cassandra. Before leaving the Spire, the Enchanted Girl reveals herself as Zhan Tiri to Rapunzel and tells her that she has been using Cassandra and threatens Corona yet again with an inevitable eclipse. Cassandra returns to her tower and activates the Mind Trap; brainwashing Hector, Adira and Quirin.
57	14	"A Tale of Two Sisters"	Shane Zalvin	Dave Schiff & Jeremy Shipp	Jerry Yu Ching and Antony Mazzotta	February 9, 2020	316	0.41
Two kids visit Gothel's old house where they are seemingly attacked by her ghost. Rapunzel, learning of this, travels to the house, only to encounter Cassandra, who had been told by Zhan Tiri to investigate the rumors. As the two fight once again, they cause the house to tip over and they fall into a mine. After escaping poisonous gas, Rapunzel and Cassandra are attacked by a giant mole and bats. They team up to escape into a room full of magic mirrors that Gothel used to record her talking about herself, where Cassandra discovers what Gothel was really like through he vain recordings, though one seems to be missing, which Zhan Tiri slips into Rapunzel's bag. A resulting fire leads to the two to run away from the giant mole in a mine cart, after which Cassandra discovers the mirror, which appears to show Gothel loving four-year-old Cassandra, giving Cass her music box and the two hugging. Believing Rapunzel lied to her, a furious Cassandra leaves her to die as revenge, but Pascal saves her. Meanwhile, Zhan Tiri discards the missing shard of the mirror, revealing that Gothel only thought of Cassandra as a lousy pest, that she had only given her the music box to keep her out of her hair.
58	15	"Flynnpostor"	Tom Caulfield	Ricky Roxburgh	Kaitlyn Ritter and Wendy Sullivan	February 16, 2020	317	0.40
After having a nightmare about Cassandra at her stronghold, the Captain of the Royal Guard steps down from his position and hands his title over to Eugene. Eugene is unsure about being chosen as the new captain, but is distracted by the news that there is a new thief who bears a remarkable resemblance to Eugene, also going by the name Flynn Rider, who has stolen the crown again. Eugene, Rapunzel, Maximus and Pascal take off to go look for the thief while Lance is left in charge of watching over Varian's new invention: The Rooster, a large machine that warns of Cassandra's imminent attack. Lance, however, soon messes with the machine, resulting in a large explosion that leaves him temporarily deaf. Rapunzel and Eugene find "Flynn" and capture him. Eugene cannot let go of the fact that this "Flynn" is taking credit for his past endeavors, but Rapunzel reminds him that he has changed. "Flynn" is later kidnapped by the Baron who has lost everything and wants revenge on "Flynn", unaware that he is not the same one. Eugene and Rapunzel catch up and a fight ensues where "Flynn" reveals that his name is Brock Thunderstrike (much to Eugene's jealousy). Eugene gets Brock to move away from the Flynn identity and they defeat the Baron together. Brock sets off with his own animal companion, a crab named Hulk Lightningclaw. While guarding the Baron's prison cell, Eugene tells Lance that he will accept the position, even though Lance cannot hear him.
59	16	"Once a Handmaiden…"	Philip Pignotti	Leanna Dindal	Adrian Barrios, Anna Lencioni and Kuni Tomita	February 23, 2020	318	0.37
Eugene and Varian create a new weapon they call "Project Obsidian", a bazooka that shoots weaponized amber crystals to combat an impending attack from Cassandra, which Rapunzel reluctantly authorizes as a last resort. Meanwhile, Cassandra discovers the missing shard from the mirror and realizes the Enchanted Girl's manipulation, who she finally discovers to be Zhan Tiri. She disguises herself in a magic cloak and takes the form of a handmaiden named Faith in an effort to make amends with Rapunzel. After performing in a play with Rapunzel (which details their battle), Zhan Tiri strips Cassandra of her cloak, revealing herself to the kingdom and causing the guards to attack. As Eugene and Varian stand down, Zhan Tiri sneaks up and activates Project Obsidian, firing a blast of amber at Cassandra. This proves to be the final straw as she, along with the possessed members of the Dark Kingdom's Brotherhood, unleashes the full power of the Moonstone and declares Corona to be hers. Eugene orders a retreat, and he tells Maximus and Pascal to take an unconscious Rapunzel away from the fallen kingdom. Later that night, Rapunzel wakes up and, to her horror, sees Corona completely taken over by Cassandra, who sits upon the throne as its conqueror.
60	17	"Plus Est En Vous"	Benjamin Balistreri, Phillip Pignotti, & Shane Zalvin	Jase Ricci	Anna Lencioni, Antony Mazzotta, Kaitlyn Ritter, Wendy Sullivan and Jenessa Warren	March 1, 2020	319-321	0.47
Rapunzel rallies all of Corona together to take back the kingdom. Varian learns that Lord Demanitus made a machine that trapped Zhan Tiri in another world called "the Lost Realm" for millennia. Rapunzel, Eugene, Pascal, Varian, Lance, Angry and Red venture to Lord Demanitus' tomb to get the plans. They realize that they have to build the machine close to Zhan Tiri and the Coronans proceed to storm the castle. Rapunzel faces off with Cassandra, but with the impending eclipse, Rapunzel's powers begin to wane. The Coronans successfully build the machine, but Hamuel accidentally activates it, sucking everyone in, except Eugene and Edmund. The Brotherhood, still affected by the Mind Trap, attack the two and they race to Cassandra's tower to destroy it. However, Edmund is revealed to also be affected and Maximus rescues Eugene. Eugene gets through to Edmund who willingly destroys the Mind Trap. They return and rescue the Coronans. With the solar eclipse in full effect, Cassandra defeats the weakened Rapunzel, but Zhan Tiri steals both the Sundrop and the Moonstone, rendering both Princess Rapunzel and Cassandra completely powerless and transforming herself into a giant squid-like demon while destroying the machine in doing so. While the Coronans alongside Adira, Hector and King Edmund battle against Zhan Tiri, Rapunzel and Cassandra make up. Inspired by the phrase in Rapunzel's book, Plus est en vous, Cassandra takes the broken piece of the moonstone from their earlier fight and gives it to Rapunzel; giving her hair just enough Sundrop energy. They battle Zhan Tiri and force her to merge the Sundrop and Moonstone gems together at the cost of Rapunzel cutting her brown hair short again. Zhan Tiri is finally destroyed as the rocks disappear and the Sundrop and Moonstone finally become one. Rapunzel uses the Healing Incantation to save everyone before sending the Ultimate Power back into the cosmos where it belongs. Cassandra decides to leave Corona to look for her real destiny and bids farewell to Rapunzel who accepts her title and role as future queen. Eugene becomes the Captain of the royal guards with Maximus at his side. Varian becomes the royal engineer and creates a heated water system with the help of his dad. King Edmund, Adira and Hector return to the Dark Kingdom to rebuild it and Lance decides to adopt Kiera (Angry) and Catalina (Red) as everyone enjoys their happily ever after. Later in the evening, Eugene once again proposes to Rapunzel, who finally accepts.

== Soundtrack ==
Rapunzel's Tangled Adventure: Plus Est En Vous

Soundtrack album by various artists
- Released: March 6, 2020
- Length: 21:56
- Label: Walt Disney
- Producer: Danny Jacob

Rapunzel's Tangled Adventure: Plus Est En Vous (Music from the TV Series) is the fourth soundtrack album from the Tangled franchise. It was released on March 6, 2020, by Walt Disney Records.

=== Track listing ===
All tracks are written by Alan Menken and Glenn Slater and produced by Danny Jacob.

Rapunzel's Tangled Adventure: Plus Est En Vous (Music from the TV Series) track listing
No.	Title	Performer(s)	Length
1.	"Crossing the Line"	Mandy Moore; Eden Espinosa	2:42
2.	"Stronger Than Ever Before"	Moore; Zachary Levi; James Monroe Iglehart	2:10
3.	"Waiting in the Wings (Reprise)"	Espinosa; Hudson D'Andrea	1:16
4.	"Bigger Than That"	Iglehart	2:07
5.	"The Girl Who Has Everything"	Moore	2:39
6.	"The Girl Who Has Everything (Reprise)"	Moore	0:57
7.	"Nothing Left to Lose"	Jeremy Jordan; Espinosa	3:30
8.	"Through It All"	Moore; Cast – Rapunzel's Tangled Adventure: Plus Est En Vous	1:49
9.	"I'd Give Anything"	Moore	1:37
10.	"Life After Happily Ever After (Finale)"	Moore; Cast – Rapunzel's Tangled Adventure: Plus Est En Vous	3:09
Total length:			21:56
