= Waiting in the Wings =

Waiting in the Wings may refer to:

== Theater, film and television ==
- Waiting in the Wings (play), a 1960 play by Noël Coward
- Waiting in the Wings (Wednesday Theatre), a 1965 Australian TV adaptation of Coward's play
- Waiting in the Wings: The Musical, a 2015 film featuring Shirley Jones
- "Waiting in the Wings" (Angel), a 2002 TV episode
- "Waiting in the Wings" (CSI: Vegas), a 2021 TV episode
- "Waiting in the Wings", an episode of I, Claudius, 1976

== Music ==
- Waiting in the Wings (Seventh Wonder album), 2006
- Waiting in the Wings, an album by Daryl Stuermer, 2001
- "Waiting in the Wings", a song by Diana Ross from The Force Behind the Power, 1991
- "Waiting in the Wings", a song by Shayne Ward from Obsession, 2010
- "Waiting in the Wings", a song from season 2 of Rapunzel's Tangled Adventure, 2019

== Literature ==
- Waiting in the Wings, a 1997 book by Cherríe Moraga
