= Queen for a Day (disambiguation) =

Queen for a Day was an American radio and television game show.

Queen for a Day may also refer to:

== Music ==
- "Queen for a Day", a song by Donna Summer from the 1977 album Once Upon a Time
- "Queen for a Day" (Parts 1 & 2), two songs by Blackmore's Night from the 2003 album Ghost of a Rose
- "Queen for a Day", a song by Dance Hall Crashers from the 1995 album Lockjaw
- Queen for a Day, a 2016 album by Anouk

== Film and television ==
- Queen for a Day (film), a 1951 film based on the show
- Queen for a Day (Arrested Development), a season 2 episode of the sitcom Arrested Development
- "Queens for a Day", the third episode in the American television series Ugly Betty
- "Queen for a Day", episode 12 of Totally Spies!.
- "Queen for a Day", episode 16 of Tangled: The Series
- "Queen for a Day", a 1995 television special of the PBS show Shining Time Station

== Other ==
- Proffer letter or "Queen for a Day" letter, allowing a defendant or witness to give information to a prosecutor
