= Donna Murphy =

American actress and singer (born 1959)

- Murphy in 2026
- Born: March 7, 1959 (age 67); New York City, U.S.
- Occupations: Actress; singer
- Years active: 1979–present
- Notable work: Fosca in Passion (1994); Anij in Star Trek: Insurrection (1998); Ruth Sherwood in Wonderful Town (2003); Voice of Mother Gothel in Disney's Tangled (2010)
- Spouse: Shawn Elliott (m. 1990; died 2016)
- Children: 1

Donna Murphy (born March 7, 1959) is an American actress and singer, best known for her work in musical theater. A five-time Tony Award nominee for Best Actress in a Musical, she has won twice: for her role as Fosca in Passion (1994–1995) and as Anna Leonowens in The King and I (1996–1997). She was also nominated for her roles as Ruth Sherwood in Wonderful Town (2003), Lotte Lenya in LoveMusik (2007), and Bubbie/Raisel in The People in the Picture (2011).

Murphy made her Broadway debut as a replacement in the 1979 musical They're Playing Our Song. Her other stage credits include the original Off-Broadway productions of Song of Singapore (1991) and Hello Again (1993), as well as the alternate to Bette Midler as the title character of Dolly Gallagher Levi in a Broadway revival of Hello, Dolly! (2017–2018). In 1997, she won a Daytime Emmy Award for Outstanding Performer in a Children's Special for her role in "Someone Had to be Benny", an episode of the HBO series Lifestories: Families in Crisis. Her film roles include Anij in Star Trek: Insurrection (1998), Rosalie Octavius in Spider-Man 2 (2004), Mother Gothel in the animated film Tangled (2010), and government agent Dita Mandy in The Bourne Legacy (2012). As of 2022, she portrays Caroline Schermerhorn Astor in the HBO series The Gilded Age.

== Early life and education ==
Donna Murphy, the eldest of seven children, was born in Corona, Queens, New York, the daughter of Jeanne (née Fink) and Robert Murphy, an aerospace engineer. Murphy is of Irish, French, German, and Czech ancestry. Her family moved to Hauppauge, Long Island, New York. At age three, she asked for voice lessons, and she put on shows as a child in Hauppauge. She later moved to Topsfield, Massachusetts and graduated from Masconomet Regional High School in 1977.

== Career ==
Murphy dropped out of the New York University drama program in her sophomore year when she was cast to understudy the three backup singers in the 1979 Broadway musical They're Playing Our Song. In a 2007 interview, Murphy explained, "At the end of my sophomore year, I took a leave of absence. I needed to audition without cutting classes." She also studied at the Lee Strasberg Theatre Institute.

She has appeared in many Off-Broadway productions, including the musical Francis in 1981 at the York Theatre at St. Peter's, The Mystery of Edwin Drood in 1985 at the Public Theater's Delacorte Theatre, Birds of Paradise in 1987 (Promenade Theatre), Privates on Parade (Roundabout Theatre) in 1989, the musical Song of Singapore in 1991, the Michael John LaChiusa musical Hello Again at the Lincoln Center Mitzi Newhouse Theater in 1993, Twelve Dreams at the Mitzi Newhouse Theater in 1995, and Helen at the Public Theater/New York Shakespeare Festival in 2002. In 2012, she appeared in Stephen Sondheim's Into the Woods at The Public Theater's Delacorte Theatre as the Witch.

On Broadway, after They're Playing Our Song (1979), she was an understudy in the musical/opera The Human Comedy in April 1984 and played various roles in The Mystery of Edwin Drood from 1985 to 1987. She also played Audrey Fulquard in Howard Ashman and Alan Menken's Little Shop of Horrors. In 1994, she played the role of Fosca in Stephen Sondheim's and James Lapine's Passion, winning the Tony Award for Best Actress in a Musical for her performance at the 48th Tony Awards. A year later she appeared in Lapine's revival, Twelve Dreams. In 1996, she played Anna Leonowens in the revival of The King and I alongside Lou Diamond Phillips, also recording a cast album. The role earned her a second Tony Award for Best Actress in a Musical at the 50th Tony Awards. She appeared as Ruth Sherwood in a revival of Wonderful Town from 2003 to 2005 (having previously performed in the New York City Center Encores! 2000 staged concert of that musical), and was nominated for the Tony Award for Best Actress in a Musical at the 58th Tony Awards and won the Drama Desk Award for Outstanding Actress in a Musical. In 2007, she appeared in LoveMusik as Lotte Lenya, opposite Michael Cerveris as Kurt Weill, receiving a Tony Award nomination at the 61st Tony Awards as well as a Drama Desk Award nomination. She appeared in the 2007 New York City Center Encores! staged concert of Follies as Phyllis. She appeared in the Roundabout Theatre production of a new musical, The People in the Picture, which opened on April 28, 2011, and closed on June 19, 2011. She was nominated for a 2011 Tony Award for Leading Actress in a Musical for her role in the production at the 65th Tony Awards.

She appeared in the Broadway revival of Hello, Dolly! as Dolly Gallagher Levi, the alternate to Bette Midler on Tuesday evenings and other select performances. She played her last performance on January 7, 2018. Murphy returned to Hello, Dolly! for six performances (July 22 and 29, August 5, 12, 19, and 20) when Midler rejoined the musical before it closed on August 25, 2018.

Murphy's film roles include Anij, Captain Jean-Luc Picard (Patrick Stewart)'s love interest, in Star Trek: Insurrection (1998); in the film Center Stage, as Juliette Simone, a ballet teacher (2000); as Rosalie Octavius, wife of Dr. Otto Octavius (Alfred Molina), the film's villain in Spider-Man 2 (2004); as Betty, a surgical research assistant in Darren Aronofsky's film The Fountain (2006), and Annie Braddock (Scarlett Johansson)'s mother Judy Braddock in The Nanny Diaries (2007). In her voice role as Mother Gothel in the animated musical film Tangled (2010), Murphy sang the song "Mother Knows Best". She also played Kathleen Walker, Corinne Walker (Vera Farmiga)'s mother in Higher Ground (2011) and Marie in Dark Horse (2011). In 2012, she appeared as government secretary Dita Mandy in The Bourne Legacy.

On television, Murphy appeared on the NBC soap opera Another World from 1989 through 1991 as District Attorney Morgan Graves. She won a Daytime Emmy Award for Outstanding Performer in a Children's Special at the 24th Daytime Emmy Awards in 1997, for playing Armanda Agrelo in "Someone Had to be Benny" (1996), an episode of the HBO series Lifestories: Families in Crisis. Other television series roles include a recurring role as Abigail Adams on Liberty! The American Revolution (1997), Murder One (1995–1996), Law & Order as Carla Tyrell in a recurring role (2000), Hack (2002–2003), Trust Me (2009) and Quantico (2017). Her voice-over work in TV commercials, includes the Le Vian chocolate diamonds series for Jared Jewelry. In 2022, Murphy joined the cast of HBO's The Gilded Age as Caroline Schermerhorn Astor.

== Personal life ==
Murphy was married to actor and singer Shawn Elliott from 1990 until his death in March 2016. She is the stepmother of Elliott's two daughters. In 2005, they adopted a daughter from Guatemala.

== Stage ==
Year	Show	Role	Location	Notes
1979–1981	They're Playing Our Song	Swing / Sonia Walsk	Imperial Theatre	Voice
1984	The Human Comedy	Bess Macauley and Mary Arena	Royale Theatre	Understudy
1985–1987	The Mystery of Edwin Drood	Various characters	Imperial Theatre	
1991	Song of Singapore	Rose	Irving Plaza	
1993–1994	Hello Again	The Whore	Mitzi E. Newhouse Theater	
1994–1995	Passion	Fosca	Plymouth Theatre	
1995	Twelve Dreams	Dorothy Trowbridge	Lincoln Center	
1996–1997	The King and I	Anna Leonowens	Neil Simon Theatre	
2002	Helen	Helen of Troy	The Public Theater	
2003–2004	Wonderful Town	Ruth Sherwood	Al Hirschfeld Theatre	
2004	Passion	Fosca	Ambassador Theatre	Concert
2007	Follies	Phyllis Stone	New York City Center	
2007	LoveMusik	Lotte Lenya	Biltmore Theatre	
2010	Anyone Can Whistle	Cora Hoover Hooper	New York City Center	
2011	The People in the Picture	Bubbie / Raisel	Studio 54	
2012	Into the Woods	The Witch	Delacorte Theater	Central Park
2017–2018	Hello, Dolly!	Dolly Gallagher Levi	Shubert Theatre	Alternate to Bette Midler
2023	Dear World	Countess Aurelia	New York City Center	
2024	Gutenberg! The Musical!	Producer	James Earl Jones Theatre	One night only

== Filmography ==
=== Film ===
Year	Title	Role	Notes
1995	Jade	Detective Karen Heller	
1998	October 22	Carole	
1998	Star Trek: Insurrection	Anij	
1999	The Astronaut's Wife	Natalie Streck	
2000	Center Stage	Juliette Simone	
2004	The Door in the Floor	Frame Shop Owner	
2004	Spider-Man 2	Rosalie Octavius	
2006	Ira & Abby	Dr. Betsy Goldman	
2006	World Trade Center	Judy Jonas	
2006	The Fountain	Betty	
2007	The Nanny Diaries	Judy Braddock	
2008	Sherman's Way	Evelyn Black	
2010	Tangled	Mother Gothel	Voice
2011	Higher Ground	Kathleen Walker	
2011	Dark Horse	Marie	
2012	The Bourne Legacy	Dita Mandy	
2016	No Pay, Nudity	Pearl	
2020	Anastasia: Once Upon a Time	Yara the Enchantress	
2023	Nowhere Men	Narrator	Voice

=== Television ===
Year	Title	Role	Notes
1987	Tales from the Hollywood Hills: A Table at Ciro's	June	Television film
1988	All My Children	Jean Flynn	Episode: "1.4888"
1991	Another World	Morgan Graves	7 episodes
1993–2000	Law & Order	Karen Unger / Carla Tyrell	3 episodes
1995–1996	Murder One	Francesca Cross	6 episodes
1996	Lifestories: Families in Crisis	Armanda Agrelo	Episode: "Someone Had to Be Benny"
1996	Remember WENN	Ruth Geddy	Episode: "Behind Every Great Woman"
1996	Passion	Fosca	Television film
1997	Nothing Sacred	Camille	Episode: "Spirit and Substance"
1997	Liberty! The American Revolution	Abigail Adams	Miniseries; 6 episodes
1998	The Practice	Marie Hanson	Episode: "Axe Murderer"
1998	Ally McBeal	Marie Hanson	Episode: "The Inmates"
1998	The Day Lincoln Was Shot	Mary Todd Lincoln	Television film
2000	The Last Debate	Joan Naylor	Television film
2000–2001	What About Joan?	Dr. Ruby Stern	Main cast (21 episodes)
2002	The Education of Max Bickford	Esther Weber	Episode: "The Good, the Bad, and the Lawyers"
2002–2003	Hack	Heather Olshansky	Main cast (16 episodes)
2005	CSI: Crime Scene Investigation	Captain Annie Krame	Episode: "Hollywood Brass"
2006	The Book of Daniel	Dr. Libby Webster	Episode: "God's Will"
2006	Studio 60 on the Sunset Strip	Blair	Episode: "Pilot"
2007	Law & Order: Criminal Intent	Maureen Pagolis	Episode: "Albatross"
2007	Damages	Nancy	Episode: "Do You Regret What We Did?"
2008	Law & Order: Special Victims Unit	Dr. Raye Massey	Episode: "Retro"
2009	Trust Me	Denise Goodman	5 episodes
2010	Ugly Betty	Eve	Episode: "Million Dollar Smile"
2012	Made in Jersey	Darlene Garetti	Main cast (7 episodes)
2013	The Mentalist	Diandra Sunderland	Episode: "Behind the Red Curtain"
2013	House of Versace	Maria	Television film
2014	The Good Wife	Judge Alice Adelson	Episode: "A Material World"
2014	Royal Pains	Berta	Episode: "Steaks on a Plane"
2014–2015	Resurrection	Angela Forrester	8 episodes
2015	Hindsight	Georgie Brady	4 episodes
2016–2017	Mercy Street	Jane Green	Main cast (12 episodes)
2017	Doubt	District Attorney Grace Russo	2 episodes
2017	Quantico	Rebecca Sherman	Episode: "Mktopaz"
2017–2020	Tangled: The Series	Mother Gothel	Voice, 6 episodes
2019	The Blacklist	Sophia Quayle	Episode: "The Pawnbrokers (No. 146/147)"
2019	The Bravest Knight	Trulla	Voice, episode: "Cedric & the Troll"
2019–2020	Power	Loretta Walsh	5 episodes
2021–2022	Gossip Girl	Headmistress Vivian Burton	4 episodes
2022	Inventing Anna	Donna Zaveri	Episode: "Two Birds, One Throne"
2022–present	The Gilded Age	Caroline Schermerhorn Astor	Main cast (11 episodes)
2024–present	Brilliant Minds	Muriel Landon	7 episodes

=== Video games ===
Year	Title	Role	Notes
2010	Tangled: The Video Game	Mother Gothel	
2019	Kingdom Hearts III	Mother Gothel	
2023	Disney Dreamlight Valley	Mother Gothel	
2024	Cookie Run: Witch's Castle	Shadow Witch	
2026	Disney Speedstorm	Mother Gothel	

== Awards and nominations ==
Year	Award	Category	Nominated work	Result
1992	Drama Desk Award	Outstanding Actress in a Musical	Song of Singapore	Nominated
1992	Outer Critics Circle Award	Outstanding Actress in a Musical	Song of Singapore	Nominated
1993	Drama Desk Award	Outstanding Actress in a Musical	Hello Again	Nominated
1994	Tony Award	Best Performance by a Leading Actress in a Musical	Passion	Won
1994	Drama Desk Award	Outstanding Actress in a Musical	Passion	Won
1996	Tony Award	Best Performance by a Leading Actress in a Musical	The King and I	Won
1996	Drama Desk Award	Outstanding Actress in a Musical	The King and I	Nominated
1996	Drama League Award	Distinguished Performance	The King and I	Nominated
1996	CableACE Award	Best Actress in a Dramatic Series of Special	Lifestories: Families in Crisis ("Someone Had to be Benny")	Won
1997	Daytime Emmy Award	Outstanding Performer in a Children's Special	Lifestories: Families in Crisis ("Someone Had to be Benny")	Won
2004	Tony Award	Best Performance by a Leading Actress in a Musical	Wonderful Town	Nominated
2004	Drama Desk Award	Outstanding Actress in a Musical	Wonderful Town	Won
2004	Drama League Award	Distinguished Performance	Wonderful Town	Nominated
2004	Outer Critics Circle Award	Outstanding Actress in a Musical	Wonderful Town	Won
2007	Tony Award	Best Performance by a Leading Actress in a Musical	LoveMusik	Nominated
2007	Drama Desk Award	Outstanding Actress in a Musical	LoveMusik	Won
2007	Drama League Award	Distinguished Performance	LoveMusik	Nominated
2007	Outer Critics Circle Award	Outstanding Actress in a Musical	LoveMusik	Won
2011	Tony Award	Best Performance by a Leading Actress in a Musical	The People in the Picture	Nominated
2011	Drama Desk Award	Outstanding Actress in a Musical	The People in the Picture	Nominated
2011	Drama League Award	Distinguished Performance	The People in the Picture	Nominated
2011	Outer Critics Circle Award	Outstanding Actress in a Musical	The People in the Picture	Nominated
2011	Alliance of Women Film Journalists Award	Best Animated Female	Tangled	Nominated
2013	Drama Desk Award	Outstanding Actress in a Musical	Into the Woods	Nominated
2023	Screen Actors Guild Awards	Outstanding Performance by an Ensemble in a Drama Series	The Gilded Age	Nominated
