= Tangled (2028 film) =

Upcoming Disney film

- Official logo
- Directed by: Michael Gracey
- Screenplay by: Jennifer Kaytin Robinson; Michael Montemayor
- Based on: Disney's Tangled by Dan Fogelman; Glen Keane Rapunzel by the Brothers Grimm
- Produced by: Kristin Burr; Michael De Luca
- Starring: Teagan Croft; Milo Manheim; Kathryn Hahn
- Cinematography: Erik Wilson
- Music by: Alan Menken
- Production companies: Walt Disney Pictures; Burr! Productions
- Distributed by: Walt Disney Studios Motion Pictures
- Release date: March 31, 2028
- Country: United States
- Language: English

Tangled is an upcoming American musical romantic fantasy comedy film and a live-action adaptation of Disney's 2010 animated film, itself loosely based on the 1812 fairy tale "Rapunzel" by the Brothers Grimm. Directed by Michael Gracey and written by Jennifer Kaytin Robinson and Michael Montemayor, the film stars Teagan Croft, Milo Manheim, and Kathryn Hahn.

Tangled will be released in cinemas on March 31, 2028, by Walt Disney Studios Motion Pictures.

== Cast ==
- Teagan Croft as Rapunzel
  - Chandler Raye as Young Rapunzel
- Milo Manheim as Flynn Rider
- Kathryn Hahn as Mother Gothel
- Diego Luna as Hawthorne
- Caitríona Balfe as Queen Arianna
- Elliot Cowan as King Frederic
- Patrick and Hugo McPherson as the Stabbington Brothers

== Production ==
=== Development ===
In February 2020, The DisInsider reported that Disney was developing a live-action Rapunzel movie, with Ashleigh Powell writing the script. ScreenRant verified the report after reaching out to Disney, although at the time it was unclear whether it would be a re-imagining of Tangled or draw more from the original Brothers Grimm fairy tale.

A live-action Tangled remake was revealed to be in development in December 2024, with Disney wanting Baz Luhrmann as director of the film. Later, Michael Gracey signed on to direct the film with Jennifer Kaytin Robinson writing the screenplay. In April 2025, it was announced that Disney had paused development, due to the underwhelming box office performance of Snow White (2025).

Development resumed in October 2025. In March 2026, Michael Montemayor joined the film as a co-writer. In April, Erik Wilson joined as cinematographer.

=== Casting ===
Before the project's shutdown, Florence Pugh and Scarlett Johansson had reportedly been offered the lead roles of Rapunzel and Mother Gothel. Additionally, Gigi Hadid and Jojo Siwa had auditioned for Rapunzel, while Corey Mylchreest auditioned for Flynn Rider.

By October 2025, Johansson was still in talks to play Mother Gothel. By December, Johansson had passed on the film due to her commitments to the films The Exorcist: Martyrs (2027) and The Batman: Part 2 (2028). That same month; Freya Skye, Sarah Catherine Hook, Teagan Croft and Olivia-Mai Barrett had screen tested for Rapunzel, while Milo Manheim, Charlie Gillespie and Gilli Jones had screen tested for Flynn Rider, respectively. Lola Tung was offered a screen-test, but had to turn it down due to other commitments. Other names in the mix for Rapunzel included McKenna Grace and Maitreyi Ramakrishnan, Mason Thames and Alex Bar for Flynn Rider, and Cher for Mother Gothel. In January 2026, it was announced that Croft and Manheim were cast as Rapunzel and Flynn Rider, respectively, with Kathryn Hahn being in talks to join the cast as Mother Gothel. Hahn was later confirmed in March. In May, Diego Luna joined the cast as a new character named Hawthorne. In July 2026, it was revealed that Patrick and Hugo McPherson were cast as the Stabbington Brothers. In August 2026, Caitríona Balfe and Elliot Cowan were revealed to have joined the cast as Queen Arianna and King Frederic. In September, it was revealed that Chandler Raye was cast as the young version of Rapunzel.

=== Filming ===
Principal photography began in Spain, specifically in Alicante, Valencian Community, from June 24, 2026, to June 30, in the cities of Catalonia; Tarragona from July 1 to July 10, and in Girona from July 13 to August 3. Filming also took place in Burgos, Castile and León, Álava, Basque Country, and Gironde, France. Filming wrapped on October 30, 2026.

== Release ==
Tangled is scheduled to be released on March 31, 2028.
