= Rapunzel's Tangled Adventure season 1 =

Rapunzel's Tangled Adventure
- Season 1
- Promotional poster
- No. of episodes: 21

Release
- Original network: Disney Channel
- Original release: March 24, 2017 – January 13, 2018

Season chronology
- Next → Season 2

The first season of Rapunzel's Tangled Adventure (known as Tangled: The Series during this season) premiered on March 24, 2017 and concluded on January 13, 2018. It begins nearly two weeks after the movie premiere Before Ever After.

== Episodes ==
No. overall	No. in season	Title	Directed by	Written by	Storyboard by	Original release date	Prod. code	U.S. viewers (millions)
2	1	"What the Hair!?"	Tom Caulfield	Dave Schiff	David Au and Kaitlyn Ritter	March 24, 2017	101	1.30
3	2	"Rapunzel's Enemy"	Stephen Sandoval	Story by : Dave Schiff and ND Stevenson; Written by : Katie Mattila	Ken Boyer and Mark John Howard	March 31, 2017	102	1.05
4	3	"Fitzherbert P.I."	Joe Oh	Story by : Ricky Roxburgh and Suzanne Weber; Written by : Jase Ricci	Heidi Jo Gilbert and Wendy Sullivan	April 7, 2017	103	1.02
5	4	"Challenge of the Brave"	Tom Caulfield	Ricky Roxburgh	Bosook Coburn and Dana Terrace	April 14, 2017	104	0.96
6	5	"Cassandra v. Eugene"	Joe Oh	Katie Mattila	Ken Boyer and Mark John Howard	April 21, 2017	105	0.97
7	6	"The Return of Strongbow"	Tom Caulfield	Dave Schiff	Wendy Sullivan and Shane Zalvin	April 28, 2017	106	1.01
8	7	"In Like Flynn"	Stephen Sandoval	Han-Yee Ling	Hillary Bradfield and Bosook Coburn	July 23, 2017	107	0.94
9	8	"Great Expotations"	Joe Oh	Ricky Roxburgh	David Au, Kaitlyn Ritter and James Suhr	July 30, 2017	108	0.99
10	9	"Under Raps"	Tom Caulfield	Kelly Hannon	Ken Boyer and Jean-Sebastien Dulcos	August 6, 2017	109	0.87
11	10	"One Angry Princess"	Stephen Sandoval	Story by : Katie Mattila and Jase Ricci; Written by : Jase Ricci	Wendy Sullivan and Shane Zalvin	August 13, 2017	110	1.13
12	11	"Pascal's Story"	Tom Caulfield	Ricky Roxburgh	Wendy Sullivan and Shane Zalvin	August 20, 2017	114	0.93
13	12	"Big Brothers of Corona"	Joe Oh	Han-Yee Ling	Hillary Bradfield and Bosook Coburn	October 1, 2017	115	1.06
14	13	"The Wrath of Ruthless Ruth"	Tom Caulfield	Kelly Hannon	David Au and Jean-Sebastien Dulcos	October 8, 2017	117	0.83
15	14	"Max's Enemy"	Joe Oh	Story by : Katie Mattila; Written by : Dave Schiff	Wendy Sullivan and Shane Zalvin	October 15, 2017	118	0.85
16	15	"The Way of the Willow"	Stephen Sandoval	Katie Mattila	Bosook Coburn and Cat Harman-Mitchell	October 22, 2017	119	0.94
17	16	"Queen for a Day"	Joe Oh	Jase Ricci	Hillary Bradfield, Tom Caulfield, Bosook Coburn, Kaitlyn Ritter and James Suhr	November 19, 2017	111–112	1.22
18	17	"Painter's Block"	Stephen Sandoval	Dave Schiff	David Au, Benjamin Balistreri, Jean-Sebastien Dulcos and Stephen Sandoval	November 25, 2017	113	0.99
19	18	"Not in the Mood"	Stephen Sandoval	Kelly Hannon	Kaitlyn Ritter and James Suhr	December 2, 2017	116	0.95
20	19	"The Quest for Varian"	Tom Caulfield	Ricky Roxburgh	Bosook Coburn, Cat Harman-Mitchell, Kaitlyn Ritter and James Suhr	December 9, 2017	120	1.06
21	20	"The Alchemist Returns"	Joe Oh	Dave Schiff	David Au, Tom Caulfield, Jean-Sebastien Dulcos, Wendy Sullivan and Shane Zalvin	December 16, 2017	121	0.96
22	21	"Secret of the Sun Drop"	Stephen Sandoval	Story by : Jase Ricci; Written by : Kelly Hannon, Jase Ricci, Ricky Roxburgh, Dave Schiff, and Jeremy Shipp	Tom Caulfield, Bosook Coburn, Cat Harman-Mitchell, Wendy Sullivan and Shane Zalvin	January 13, 2018	122–123	0.96

== Soundtrack ==
Tangled: The Series

Soundtrack album by various artists
- Released: January 19, 2018
- Length: 26:54
- Label: Walt Disney
- Producers: Andy Dodd; Danny Jacob

Singles from Tangled: The Series
- 1. "Wind in My Hair" Released: February 10, 2017; 2. "Life After Happily Ever After" Released: March 10, 2017; 3. "More of Me" Released: March 24, 2017

Tangled: The Series (Music from the TV Series) is the second soundtrack album from the Tangled franchise. It was released on January 19, 2018, by Walt Disney Records.

=== Track listing ===
All tracks are written by Alan Menken and Glenn Slater and produced by Danny Jacob, except "More of Me", which is written by Dewain Whitmore Jr. and Andy Dodd and produced by Dodd.

Tangled: The Series (Music from the TV Series) track listing
No.	Title	Performer(s)	Length
1.	"Wind in My Hair" (from Tangled: Before Ever After)	Rapunzel (Mandy Moore)	2:34
2.	"Life After Happily Ever After" (from Tangled: Before Ever After)	Cast – Tangled	4:41
3.	"Wind in My Hair (Reprise)"	Rapunzel (Moore); Eugene (Zachary Levi)	1:37
4.	"I've Got This"	Rapunzel (Moore)	2:33
5.	"Let Me Make You Proud"	Varian (Jeremy Jordan)	2:07
6.	"Let Me Make You Proud (Reprise)"	Varian (Jordan)	1:02
7.	"Friendship Song"	Brennley Brown	2:10
8.	"Listen Up"	Ruthless Ruth (Danielle Brooks)	2:49
9.	"Set Yourself Free"	Rapunzel (Moore)	2:15
10.	"Ready As I'll Ever Be"	Varian (Jordan); Cast – Tangled	2:03
11.	"More of Me" (from Tangled: Before Ever After)	Natasha Bedingfield	3:03
Total length:			26:54

EP version
No.	Title	Performer(s)	Length
1.	"I've Got This"	Rapunzel (Moore)	2:33
2.	"Let Me Make You Proud"	Varian (Jordan)	2:07
3.	"Listen Up"	Ruthless Ruth (Brooks)	2:49
4.	"Friendship Song"	Brown	2:10
Total length:			9:39
