= Rapunzel's Tangled Adventure season 2 =

Season of television series

Rapunzel's Tangled Adventure
- Season 2
- Promotional poster
- No. of episodes: 21

Release
- Original network: Disney Channel
- Original release: June 24, 2018 – April 14, 2019

Season chronology
- ← Previous; Season 1 Next → Season 3

The second season of Rapunzel's Tangled Adventure premiered on June 24, 2018, and concluded on April 14, 2019. The series was retitled from Tangled: The Series to Rapunzel's Tangled Adventure ahead of second season premiere.

== Episodes ==
No. overall	No. in season	Title	Directed by	Written by	Storyboard by	Original release date	Prod. code	U.S. viewers (millions)
23	1	"Beyond the Corona Walls"	Joe Oh	Jase Ricci	Juston Gordon-Montgomery, David Pimentel, Kaitlyn Ritter, Wendy Sullivan and Shane Zalvin	June 24, 2018	201–202	0.67
Rapunzel has begun following the Black Rocks and joining her on her journey are Eugene, Cassandra, Pascal, Maximus, Fidella, Owl, Lance, Hook Foot and Shorty (who stowed away). During this time, Eugene is planning on proposing to Rapunzel again, but when Rapunzel accidentally reveals herself when he is practicing it causes an awkward situation between the couple when Rapunzel doesn't give him an answer. Meanwhile, Rapunzel and the group are making their first stop in Vardaros, a city Eugene and Lance previously visited in their past, but discover it has become overrun with criminals. While Eugene and the boys remain in the city to gather supplies, news of Eugene's arrival quickly spreads among the citizens, including the city's leader, the Baron, a criminal kingpin who previously worked with Eugene and Lance in the past and seeks revenge. Eugene, Lance and Shorty are quickly captured by the Baron's men and taken to his castle where they meet the Baron and his daughter, Stalyan, Eugene's ex-fiancée. The Baron threatens Lance's life unless Eugene marries Stalyan. Meanwhile, Rapunzel and Cassandra meet Adira, a mysterious warrior who harbors knowledge on the Black Rocks, but their meeting is interrupted when Hook Foot arrives and reveals Eugene has been kidnapped. Rapunzel and the group return to Vardaros to find Eugene, only to learn about his engagement to Stalyan, leaving Rapunzel heartbroken and regretting her decision on rejecting Eugene's marriage proposal. However, after being encouraged by Cassandra, Rapunzel returns to Vardaros and stops the wedding between Eugene and Stalyan, resulting in a fight breaking out. The Baron is defeated, Lance is saved and Rapunzel and Eugene are reunited and decide to once again hold off on marriage. Rapunzel and the group resume their journey, but not before Rapunzel receives a scroll piece from Adira with new information on the Black Rocks.
24	2	"The Return of Quaid"	Tom Caulfield	Jeremy Shipp	Gaelle Beerens, Casey Coffey and Anna Lencioni	July 1, 2018	203	0.61
Following the Baron's defeat, Rapunzel and the group are ready to depart Vardaros, but Rapunzel is unhappy to leave the city in a disastrous state and with a power vacuum, Anthony the Weasel decides to take over Vardaros. Rapunzel and the group intervene, but Anthony promises to return in a few days to permanently take over the city. Rapunzel and the group stay to fight, but find the citizens unwilling to help. Vex advises the group to seek out Captain Quaid, the retired sheriff of Vardaros. Rapunzel and the group meet Quaid and convince him to come out of retirement, but Quaid is rusty after years of retirement, causing him to lose confidence in himself but he also believes Vardaros is no longer worth saving. Rapunzel and the group train Quaid and secretly help restore his confidence by faking a robbery. With renewed confidence, Quaid begins to inspire the people and makes Vex his deputy, but changes his mind when he learns the robbery was faked, leaving Vex, Rapunzel and the group to face Anthony alone who has returned with a bounty hunter. They hold the upper hand against the group, but with a change of heart, Quaid returns and alongside Vex are victorious after inspiring the citizens to take back their city.
25	3	"Goodbye and Goodwill"	Stephen Sandoval	Story by : Ricky Roxburgh; Written by : Dave Schiff	Bosook Coburn and Cat Harman-Mitchell	July 8, 2018	204	0.59
In hopes of further uplifting the spirits of the citizens, Rapunzel decides to bring the Goodwill festival to Vardaros, but the citizens are not enthusiastic about the upcoming festivities until Cassandra presents daring and dangerous activities. Rapunzel and Cassandra attempt to work together, but they quickly begin to argue and disagree, resulting in them breaking off their partnership and planning their own separate events. However, Rapunzel notices everyone is more interested in Cassandra's ideas and attempts a reconciliation, but the competitiveness between them further escalates and Rapunzel prepares the final event, featuring both dangers and thrills. Eugene tries to help Rapunzel and Cassandra mend their friendship and handcuffs them together. Meanwhile, Lance and Hook Foot are in charge of finding a gopher for the final event, but bring back a dangerous Sneezeweasel instead that quickly begins to cause harm and disarray. Rapunzel and Cassandra work together to stop the Sneezeweasel and at the same time reconcile their friendship. By the end of the festival, Rapunzel and the group leave Vardaros and continue on their journey.
26	4	"Forest of No Return"	Joe Oh	Kelly Hannon	Juston Gordon-Montgomery and Kaitlyn Ritter	July 15, 2018	205	0.53
The group finds themselves lost in the mysterious, ever-changing "Forest of No Return". Eugene's navigating skills prove disastrous for everyone until the mysterious Adira appears yet again, with a map that can lead them through it. Eugene becomes envious of Adira, and becomes separated from the group after falling into a sink pool. They eventually find their way out and continue their journey on the black rock trail.
27	5	"Freebird"	Tom Caulfield	Dave Schiff	Wendy Sullivan and Shane Zalvin	July 22, 2018	206	0.57
When their caravan breaks down, Rapunzel and Cassandra wander off, where they eventually meet a couple only known as the Mother and Father, who trick them into drinking a tea that turns them into birds. Though assured that they could using magical eggs to return to normal before they lose their intelligence within an hour, the group finds out that the Mother and Father have been tricking and imprisoning innocent people as birds. As the group escapes and use the eggs to restore the villains' victims to normal, the supply runs out for Rapunzel, angering Cassandra enough to smash the magic teapot, causing the villains to vanish. Fortuitously, a transformed Shorty produces the eggs needed to restore himself and Rapunzel to normal.
28	6	"Vigor the Visionary"	Stephan Sandoval	Ricky Roxburgh	Anna Lencioni and Stephen Sandoval	July 29, 2018	207	0.52
Rapunzel and Eugene are on a romantic date together until they come across a fortune-teller, Madame Canardist who presents them her pet monkey, Vigor the Visionary who can make psychic predictions. While Eugene refuses to believe fortune-tellers to be real, he and Rapunzel soon find themselves helping Madame Canardist when Vigor is stolen. Eugene discovers the thieves to be Angry and Red, who revealed they "borrowed" Vigor as Angry believes he can help her find her long lost family. Eugene and Rapunzel agree to help, despite Eugene's concerns and doubts. Vigor begins to lead the group and soon Angry is apparently reunited with her family who also welcome Red. However, Eugene and Rapunzel learn the couple are not Angry's real family and are actually two thieves in hiding. Angry and Red subdue the criminals, but Angry is left upset and hurt. Eugene comforts Angry, helping her realize she has found a new family in Red, uplifting her spirits. The group returns Vigor to Madame Canardist and Red and Angry once again part ways with Eugene and Rapunzel.
29	7	"Keeper of the Spire"	Bosook Coburn	Jase Ricci and Jeremy Shipp	Bosook Coburn and Cat Harman-Mitchell	August 5, 2018	208	0.64
In order to acquire the third scroll piece, Rapunzel, Eugene, Cassandra and Lance travel to the home of the Keeper of the Spire and meet Calliope who informs them the third piece is kept inside the Spire's vault at the top of the mountain. The group begins the long journey to the Spire's vault the following day and become increasingly annoyed by Calliope's rude, arrogant and inconsiderate behavior. Despite Calliope's treatment, Rapunzel insists they still need her help all while they being dangerously pursued by the vault's protector, the Kurlock. The group eventually reach the Spire's vault, but again encounter the Kurlock and discover Calliope is not the real Keeper of the Spire. Calliope admits she is actually the Keeper's apprentice, but felt she lost purpose in herself when the Keeper mysteriously disappeared. Rapunzel encourages Calliope and by working together, they succeed in defeating the Kurlock and acquiring the third scroll piece. Calliope is reunited with the real Keeper who reveals this was Calliope's final test to which she has successfully passed, allowing her to become the new Keeper of the Spire. After parting ways, Rapunzel and the group learn the third scroll piece contains an image of a hooded male figure.
30	8	"King Pascal"	Tom Caulfield	Kelly Hannon	Gaelle Beerens, Juston Gordon-Montgomery and Kaitlyn Ritter	August 12, 2018	209	0.60
While following the black rocks out to sea, the group is stranded on an island after a storm. The tiny islanders, the Lorbs, mistake Pascal, who is feeling belittled and small, for their mystical ruler, and the attention goes to his head. However, the Lorbs expect Pascal to defeat their enemy, a giant fire breathing firefly. The group discovers the firefly is only rampaging because it is in pain from eating dangerously hot peppers and Pascal saves the day by feeding it the antidote.
31	9	"There's Something About Hook Foot"	Stephan Sandoval	Jeremy Shipp	Wendy Sullivan and Shane Zalvin	August 19, 2018	210	0.60
The group have recently begun to notice a change in Hook Foot's behavior and discover he has developed romantic feelings for a mermaid named Seraphina, but is nervous about his upcoming first romantic date with her. Rapunzel and Eugene attempt to help Hook Foot by offering him advice, but realize they have a difference in opinion on how Hook Foot should behave. Eventually, Hook Foot and Seraphina's first date arrives and despite a rocky upstart, Hook Foot and Seraphina grow closer and fall in love. However, Water Goblins suddenly appear from the ocean and are after Seraphina, who is revealed to be a thief after stealing a priceless delicate pearl. Seraphina and Hook Foot attempt to run away together, but after seeing Hook Foot and his friends in danger, Seraphina willingly gives herself to save them.
32	10	"Happiness Is…"	Joe Oh	Ricky Roxburgh	Morin Halperin, Todd Kurosawa and Anna Lencioni	August 26, 2018	211	0.50
Rapunzel begins to feel homesick for Corona when she finds an old letter written by her father in one of the many lanterns sent from her previous birthdays. In attempts to uplift her spirits, Rapunzel explores the island and comes across a magical idol that brings instant happiness to whoever possesses it. Rapunzel begins to hallucinate her family and friends back in Corona and soon shares the idol with the rest of the group. However, everyone starts to become obsessive over the idol, desperately wanting it for themselves. Rapunzel tricks everyone into giving her the idol, but when the Lorbs try to help Rapunzel, they fall under the idol's control and soon begin to terrorize the village. Rapunzel's friends and the Lorbs begin to fight each other to acquire the idol and Rapunzel, finally realizing the error of her ways, manages to gain the idol and with the help of Eugene and Cassandra overcomes its power and destroys it. The group and Lorbs hold a celebration in honor of their victory and Rapunzel comes to terms with her homesickness and sends a lantern back to Corona and her parents.
33	11	"Max and Eugene in Peril on the High Seas"	Tom Caulfield	Dave Schiff	Bosook Coburn and Cat Harman-Mitchell	March 3, 2019	212	0.37
Rapunzel and the group are finally leaving Tirapai Island when the cargo ferry arrives, but Eugene and Maximus get into an argument, resulting in them falling overboard. They manage to save themselves on a passing ship, but discover it to be a prison ship where all the criminals, including the Stabbington Brothers, Lady Caine and Axel have escaped and taken control. Eugene and Maximus attempt to escape, but discover the villains' plot to ambush the cargo ferry and set out to stop them. Meanwhile, Rapunzel and the group discover Eugene and Maximus are missing and set out to rescue them.
34	12	"Curses!"	Stephen Sandoval	Kelly Hannon	Juston Gordon-Montgomery and Kaitlyn Ritter	March 10, 2019	213	0.36
After "stealing" a telescope, which was a present from her father, Rapunzel is cursed with bad luck by Vigor the Visionary, as she and her companions traverse a mountain pass. Soon, everyone except Eugene begins to believe the curse is real; Hook Foot gives her clues on how to break it by making a potion from the Source Book of Superstitions while Cassandra and Lance cover themselves with good luck charms. When the group has to cross a dangerous pass, Rapunzel takes Eugene's advice about making her own luck and disproves the curse by making it across.
35	13	"The Eye of Pincosta"	Joe Oh	Jeremy Shipp	Wendy Sullivan and Shane Zalvin	March 10, 2019	214	0.38
The group arrive in the town of Pincosta, but Eugene is immediately thrown in jail for having previously stolen the town's largest diamond, the Eye of Pincosta. The sheriff sentences Eugene to work in the deadly copper mines and when Lance accidentally reveals out loud their intention to break Eugene out, the rest of the group are thrown in jail as well. Rapunzel negotiates with the sheriff, offering to find and retrieve the Eye of Pincosta in exchange for Eugene and the group's release. The sheriff agrees, but on the condition that Rapunzel returns in two days. Rapunzel confronts Eugene about the theft and reluctantly, Eugene reveals he previously worked together with Stalyan, forcing Rapunzel to seek out Stalyan and persuades her to help.
36	14	"Rapunzel and the Great Tree"	Tom Caulfield and Stephen Sandoval	Jase Ricci	Bosook Coburn, Cat Harman-Mitchell, Todd Kurosawa and Anna Lencioni	March 17, 2019	215–216	0.37
The group makes it to the Great Tree, an ancient tree that was once corrupted by Zhan Tiri, only to be confronted by a new adversary: Hector, the brother in arms of Adira, and the most dangerous member of the Brotherhood; sworn to keep all from reaching the Dark Kingdom. As they navigate through the Great Tree, Rapunzel discovers incantations for the Sundrop and the Moonstone, the latter which overwhelms the magical powers of the Sundrop in her blonde hair and causes injury and weakness to those around her. After breaking Rapunzel free from the incantation, the group is attacked again by Hector, who unleashes the sealed evil of the tree. Rapunzel reluctantly uses the Decay Incantation, against Cassandra's warnings, to stop Hector and destroy the tree, but Cassandra cripples her hand breaking Rapunzel out of the incantation. Despite all that happened, the group continues following the black rocks.
37	15	"The Brothers Hook"	Tom Caulfield	Ricky Roxburgh	Wendy Sullivan and Shane Zalvin	March 24, 2019	218	0.28
Rapunzel takes everyone to see Hook Hand in concert. However, this brings back bad memories in Hook Foot, as he was always overshadowed and looked down on by his elder brother. Hook Hand is revealed to be employed by the self-centered King Trevor who wants Hook Hand to play at the ceremony of the marriage between the Seal of Equis and his female mate. Hook Foot finally fulfills his childhood dream of dancing by humiliating King Trevor in a dance-off, which he wins as the female seal is the judge. This finally brings Hook Hand to accept his younger brother's dreams and allows him to accompany him on the road.
38	16	"Rapunzel: Day One"	Stephen Sandoval	Leanna Dindal	Todd Kurosawa and Anna Lencioni	March 24, 2019	217	0.30
Rapunzel and Cassandra come across an abandoned magic stall while searching for parts of their destroyed caravan. The stall contains a wand of forgetting. Cassandra impulsively wishes that Rapunzel would "just forget about everything" when she was tired of her trying to patch things up between them, which results in Rapunzel regressing to when she was still in her tower with Gothel.
39	17	"Mirror, Mirror"	Joe Oh	Dave Schiff	Juston Gordon-Montgomery and Kaitlyn Ritter	March 31, 2019	219	0.31
When their caravan is waylaid by a fallen tree in the middle of a storm, the group stop by a seashell house owned by a Frenchman named Matthews. As they explore the house, they come across a mirror that houses evil doppelgängers who quickly replace everyone except Rapunzel and Pascal. Through their quick thinking, Rapunzel manages to save everyone and trap their doubles. They try to leave, but the storm is still raging, forcing the group to stay for the night, unaware that the tree that trapped them was purposely chopped down by an ax.
40	18	"You're Kidding Me!"	Joe Oh	Kelly Hannon	Bosook Coburn, Cat Harman-Mitchell, Diana Kidlaeid and Todd Kurosawa	March 31, 2019	220	0.33
The front door of the mysterious seashell estate vanishes, trapping the group. They try to find another way out but find a spinning top whose magic regresses Cassandra and Lance into toddlers and Shorty into a baby. Rapunzel and Eugene try their best to act like parents, but they each have different ways to approach their friends without upsetting them. They later succeed in getting Cassandra, Lance and Shorty back to their actual ages, but still have yet to find a way out of the estate. Matthews is revealed to be another disciple of the dark sorcerer Zhan Tiri, who has ordered him to "keep the Sundrop in the house forever".
41	19	"Rapunzeltopia"	Tom Caulfield	Ricky Roxburgh	Giovanny F. Cardenas, Juston Gordon-Montgomery, Kaitlyn Ritter and Yonatan Tal	April 7, 2019	221	0.35
Matthews reveals himself as another dark spirit and disciple of Zhan Tiri, and traps Eugene, Lance and the others in unbreakable vines similar to the Great Tree's evil magic. He has Rapunzel trapped in a dream where she lives the perfect life while he prepares to hand over the mystical powers of the Sundrop to his master. Fortunately, Rapunzel is able to make contact with her brown-haired dream self and attempts to convince her to let go. She manages to gain control over the dream world and have Matthews overpowered, causing the House of Yesterday's Tomorrow to vanish. Cassandra seems to have been left behind, but suddenly reappears through the remaining door. Rapunzel embraces her close friend, but she is acting slightly strange, which Owl notices. With everyone out, the group continue are one step closer towards the Dark Kingdom.
42	20	"Lost and Found"	Shane Zalvin	Jeremy Shipp	Diana Kidlaeid and Wendy Sullivan	April 7, 2019	222	0.35
Rapunzel and Eugene go on a journey to retrieve the fourth and final piece of the scroll that will lead them to the Dark Kingdom. They receive help from Vigor the Visionary, who reveals himself to be Lord Demanitus himself, the author of the scroll depicting the purpose of the Sundrop and Moonstone. He leads them to the maze that he hid the last piece of the scroll in. Guiding them through the maze, they obtain the last piece, which united the four into one singular map. As they are about to leave, they are attacked by a stone monster. Rapunzel and Eugene manage to defeat it. Vigor, in return, gives Eugene the jewel from his turban. That night, Eugene discovers the jewel is actually a locket. Upon opening it, he discovers a warning from Demanitus, saying that one member of their group will ultimately betray Rapunzel once they reach the Dark Kingdom. As Eugene scans the group, his eyes fall on Cassandra who flashes a sinister smile as she looks at Rapunzel, which shocks him. Flashbacks reveal that Quirin was a member of the Brotherhood of the Dark Kingdom, and that Mother Gothel herself was one of Lord Demanitus' loyal pupils, but had ultimately deserted and betrayed him to serve under his arch-nemesis Zhan Tiri in the centuries before the feature movie.
43	21	"Destinies Collide"	Tom Caulfield & Joe Oh	Jase Ricci, Leanna Dindal, Kelly Hannon, Ricky Roxburgh, Dave Schiff, & Jeremy Shipp	Bosook Coburn, Cat Harman-Mitchell, Diana Kidlaeid, Todd Kurosawa, Anna Lencioni, Kaitlyn Ritter and Wendy Sullivan	April 14, 2019	223–224	0.35
Rapunzel and the group have reached the end of their journey and have arrived on the outskirts of the Dark Kingdom. However, Eugene remains worried about Lord Demanitus’ prophecy that someone will turn against Rapunzel, who is doubtful of the premonition. As the group continue onward, they are attacked by a masked figure, King Edmund, who reveals himself as Eugene's father. Ultimately, Rapunzel manages to get into the chamber where the Moonstone resides, but just as she is about to touch it, Cassandra suddenly snatches it for herself and merges with it.

== Soundtrack ==
Rapunzel's Tangled Adventure

Soundtrack album by various artists
- Released: April 12, 2019
- Length: 32:15
- Label: Walt Disney
- Producers: Danny Jacob; Kevin Kliesch

Rapunzel's Tangled Adventure (Music from the TV Series) is the third soundtrack album from the Tangled franchise. It was released on April 12, 2019, by Walt Disney Records.

=== Track listing ===
All tracks are written by Alan Menken and Glenn Slater and produced by Danny Jacob, except for tracks 11–13, which are written and produced by Kevin Kliesch.

Rapunzel's Tangled Adventure (Music from the TV Series) track listing
No.	Title	Performer(s)	Length
1.	"Next Stop Anywhere"	Mandy Moore; Zachary Levi; Eden Espinosa	3:29
2.	"If I Could Take This Moment Back"	Moore; Levi	2:11
3.	"Next Stop Anywhere (Reprise)"	Moore; Levi	1:33
4.	"The View from Up Here"	Moore; Espinosa	2:45
5.	"Hook's Foot's Ballad"	Jeff Ross	0:48
6.	"Buddy Song"	Levi; James Monroe Iglehart	2:31
7.	"Waiting in the Wings"	Espinosa	2:32
8.	"Livin' the Dream"	Fred Tatasciore	2:16
9.	"With You by My Side"	Moore; Levi; Espinosa	2:18
10.	"Everything I Ever Thought I Knew"	Levi	2:24
11.	"Rocks Point the Way"	Kliesch	3:05
12.	"Tower Escape and Destruction"	Kliesch	3:11
13.	"Onward to the Dark Kingdom"	Kliesch	3:12
Total length:			32:15
