= Tangled: The Video Game =

2010 video game

Tangled
- North American cover art
- Developer: Planet Moon Studios (Note: Ported to Microsoft Windows by GameStar.)
- Publisher: Disney Interactive Studios
- Composer: Olivier Deriviere
- Platforms: Wii, Nintendo DS, Microsoft Windows
- Release: NA: November 23, 2010; EU: January 21, 2011; Windows: EU: December 2, 2010; NA: October 6, 2014 (Steam)
- Genre: Action-adventure
- Modes: Single-player, multiplayer

Tangled is a 2010 action-adventure game developed by Planet Moon Studios and published by Disney Interactive Studios for the Wii, Nintendo DS, and Microsoft Windows. It is based on the 2010 CGI-animated film of the same name.

== Gameplay ==
Tangled's gameplay consists of a mix of platforming and puzzle elements and is designed with a heavy emphasis on two-player cooperative gameplay. The player controls Rapunzel, a princess with magical hair abducted by Mother Gothel since childhood, and a second player can control Flynn Rider, a fugitive thief who seeks refuge in Rapunzel's tower after stealing a crown. If a player plays alone, they can switch between Rapunzel and Flynn when needed, with the other character controlled by the game's artificial intelligence. Rapunzel's room acts as a central hub with which main story missions, challenges and a coloring activity can be accessed.

Each character has their own special abilities, in keeping with the film's overarching story–Rapunzel can heal the environment and grow flowers using her magical hair, while Flynn can cut through shrubbery and other obstacles using his saber. In addition, Rapunzel can also use her hair as a makeshift rope to hoist Flynn onto higher ground or swing her way through certain tree branches. Both characters have their own respective meter which fills up upon performing certain actions such as collecting orbs and coins scattered across the level, healing flowers or engaging in melee combat, with Flynn being able to perform a special attack once the meter is full. Both players are armed with their own weapons–a frying pan for Rapunzel and a saber for Flynn; Flynn can fully incapacitate enemies while Rapunzel can only repel them.

== Plot ==
The story follows that of the film closely, with Mandy Moore and Zachary Levi reprising their roles as Rapunzel and Flynn. In a faraway kingdom, a king sought a cure for his wife's life-threatening ailment. After hearing of a magical flower that could cure everything, he ordered a broth made of the flower, and his wife was immediately cured. The trade-off was that their newborn daughter had long, flowing blonde hair that possessed its own healing powers. Hearing of this discovery, an evil witch kidnapped the infant princess, locked her away in a tower, raised her as her own child and warned her of the horrors of the outside world. Years later, a bandit by the name of Flynn Rider came upon the tower and found himself knocked out by the now-teenage princess named Rapunzel. After agreeing to hide his stolen stash, she made a deal with the bandit: the stash would be returned only if he agreed to show her the kingdom where flying lanterns were released every night on her birthday.

== Reception ==
Reception

Aggregate score
Aggregator	Score	
Aggregator	DS	Wii
Metacritic	70/100	63/100

Review score
Publication	Score	
Publication	DS	Wii
The Guardian	N/A	3/5

The DS and Wii versions received "mixed or average reviews" according to video game review aggregator Metacritic.
