= Jennifer Kaytin Robinson =

American actress, director, producer, and writer (born 1988)

- Born: April 4, 1988 (age 38); Miami, Florida, U.S.
- Other name: Jennifer K. Robinson
- Occupations: Film director; film producer; screenwriter
- Years active: 2007–present

Jennifer Kaytin Robinson (born April 4, 1988) is an American film director, producer, and screenwriter best known for co-writing and directing 2025's legacy film I Know What You Did Last Summer.

== Early life ==
Jennifer Kaytin Robinson was born and raised in Miami, Florida, moving to Los Angeles in 2004, at the age of 16, and reaching the final round of auditions of Hannah Montana to play Miley Cyrus's best friend Lilly. While acting, she began working in fashion PR between New York and Los Angeles, which led her to start a career in writing.

== Career ==
In 2016, Robinson created and produced Sweet/Vicious for MTV, a dark comedy series about two female college students who become vigilantes, taking justice into their own hands to revenge on sexual abusers. Although the show received positive reviews, with Variety naming Sweet/Vicious one of their 20 Best New Shows of 2016, it was cancelled after one season. In 2016, Robinson was named as one of Variety‘s 10 TV Writers to Watch, and was invited to speak at the White House under the Obama administration and Vice President Joe Biden's final "It's On Us" summit.

In 2019, Robinson made her feature directorial debut for Netflix with Someone Great, which was generally well received by critics. In 2020, Robinson co-wrote Marvel Studios's Thor: Love and Thunder with director Taika Waititi. Also in 2020, Robinson received a screenplay credit on HBO Max's Unpregnant. In 2022 Robinson directed and co-wrote the Netflix film Do Revenge, starring Camila Mendes and Maya Hawke, a high school comedy version of Strangers on a Train, which received generally positive reviews. Robinson co-wrote, directed and executive produced 2025's legacy film I Know What You Did Last Summer, which received mostly negative reviews, and disappointed at the box office.

In December 2024, she scripted a live-action adaptation of the Disney animated film Tangled (2010).

== Filmography ==
Film

Year	Title	Director	Writer	Producer
2019	Someone Great	Yes	Yes	Executive
2020	Unpregnant	No	Yes	No
2022	Thor: Love and Thunder	No	Yes	No
2022	Do Revenge	Yes	Yes	Yes
2025	I Know What You Did Last Summer	Yes	Yes	Executive
2028	Tangled	No	Yes	No

Television

Year	Title	Director	Writer	Executive Producer	Notes
2016	Sweet/Vicious	No	Yes	Yes	Also creator
2020	Love Life	Yes	No	No	Episode: "Magnus Lund Part II"

Consulting producer

- Hawkeye (2021)

== See also ==
- List of female film and television directors
- List of LGBT-related films directed by women
