= Mother Gothel =

Fictional character in Tangled film

- Tangled character
- Mother Gothel as she appears in Disney's Tangled.
- First appearance: Tangled (2010)
- Based on: Dame Gothel by the Brothers Grimm
- Adapted by: Dan Fogelman
- Voiced by: Donna Murphy
- Portrayed by: Katie Whetsell (Tangled: The Musical); Emma Booth (Once Upon a Time); Kathryn Hahn (live-action film)

In-universe information
- Affiliation: Disney villains
- Children: Rapunzel (kidnapped foster daughter); Cassandra (daughter); Ginny Gothel (daughter in Descendants); Alice/Tilly (daughter in Once Upon a Time)

Mother Gothel is a fictional character in Disney's Tangled franchise, who first appears in the 2010 animated film. Based on Dame Gothel from the fairy tale "Rapunzel", Mother Gothel is a vain elderly woman who hoards the healing powers of a magical golden flower to remain young and beautiful for centuries. When the flower is harvested to heal the kingdom's pregnant queen, its powers are inherited by the newborn princess, Rapunzel. Determined to retain access to the flower's powers, Gothel kidnaps the infant and raises her in a secluded tower, posing as her mother while exploiting Rapunzel's magical hair to remain eternally young.

Due to needing to serve as both a villain and maternal figure to Rapunzel, the filmmakers identified Gothel as the film's most difficult character to develop. They made her a more complex villain than the witch from the fairy tale by removing her magical powers and having her rely solely on her wit, charisma, and intelligence. The character is voiced by actress Donna Murphy in her voice acting debut. Gothel's appearance was designed to make it obvious that she and Rapunzel are not related, with her features inspired by both Murphy's own appearance and American singer Cher.

Mother Gothel has received a mostly positive reception from film critics, who praised her humor, personality, and effectiveness as a villain, while Murphy's performance received widespread acclaim. However, some critics considered Gothel too passive or tame compared with previous Disney villains. She has since appeared in numerous tie-in media within and beyond the Tangled franchise, including video games and television series. She will be portrayed by Kathryn Hahn in the upcoming live-action adaptation of the film.

== Role ==
Mother Gothel first appears in Tangled (2010). Having discovered that a magical golden flower could preserve her youth, Gothel secretly hoards its powers for centuries until the flower harvested to heal the pregnant Queen of Corona, inadvertently transferring its powers to her newborn daughter, Princess Rapunzel. Rapunzel inherits the flower's rejuvenating abilities through her golden hair. After discovering that Rapunzel's hair loses its powers when cut, Gothel kidnaps her as an infant and raises her as her daughter in an isolated tower, exploiting her powers to maintain her youth. As Rapunzel approaches adulthood, she repeatedly begs Gothel to let her leave the tower and see the outside world, particularly the floating lanterns released annually in memory of the lost princess. Gothel refuses, using fear and manipulation to convince Rapunzel that the outside world is dangerous and that she is incapable of protecting herself. When Rapunzel eventually escapes the tower with Flynn Rider, a thief, Gothel pursues them and enlists the Stabbington Brothers to help separate the pair. After Rapunzel develops romantic feelings for Flynn, Gothel convinces her that he has abandoned her by having the Stabbington Brothers capture him and arranging for him to be taken to the kingdom to face execution, while making Rapunzel believe that he has taken the crown and left her. Rapunzel returns to the tower with Gothel, but later discovers her true identity and rebels against her. Gothel fatally wounds Flynn and attempts to flee with Rapunzel, who offers to remain with her if she is allowed to heal him. Flynn then cuts Rapunzel's hair, causing it to lose its magic and Gothel to rapidly age. Gothel subsequently falls from the tower to her death, disintegrating into dust.

== Development ==
=== Creation ===
Walt Disney had attempted to adapt the "Rapunzel" fairy tale into a feature-length animated film during the 1940s, but struggled to develop the project because the story was considered too "small". When Disney greenlit a "Rapunzel" film decades later, the film's original director, Glen Keane, spent several years exploring possible directions for its villain. He had also considered giving Gothel's tower an origin story in which it was the only remaining ruin of a kingdom. By 2008, Tangled's directors, Nathan Greno and Byron Howard, decided to broaden the scope of the story and its characters. The directors felt pressure to create a villain who would meet the standards established by "classic" Disney films, and envisioned Gothel as a more complex villain than the witch from the original fairy tale. Outside of certain influences and personality traits, little had been determined about the character early in development. In the Brothers Grimm fairy tale, Gothel is depicted as a typical witch-like figure, whereas Disney reimagined the character by deriving her powers from Rapunzel's hair, rather than from her own magical abilities. A departure from traditional Disney villains, Mother Gothel is neither a witch nor a sorceress. The character's lack of supernatural powers forces her to rely on her wit, charm, intelligence, and charisma, a deliberate choice made by the writers and directors.

Tangled's creatives agreed that Gothel was the film's most difficult character to develop, a challenge further complicated by the fact that, within the context of the original fairy tale, some of her actions are arguably justified. In most versions of the Brothers Grimm's fairy tale, Dame Gothel (Note: In later editions of the Brothers Grimm's "Rapunzel," the character is referred to as "Dame Gothel".) takes Rapunzel as payment after catching her father stealing rampion from her garden. She later cuts Rapunzel's hair herself after discovering her relationship with a prince. The filmmakers reported that too much emphasis had initially been placed on Flynn Rider at the expense of the other characters, prompting them to rebalance the cast and expand Gothel's role. According to animator Clay Kaytis, the character resembled a one-dimensional villain for much of the film's development, relying primarily on menacing facial expressions. During production, the filmmakers initially struggled to find the right balance between Gothel's roles as a villain and a mother. They questioned how she could convincingly manipulate Rapunzel into remaining in the tower despite mistreating her, particularly because Rapunzel was written as an intelligent and perceptive character. Some members of the staff felt that Gothel was not villainous enough compared to earlier Disney villains, while at other points her characterization was considered too dark. The film's composer, Alan Menken, spent much of the film's development concerned that Gothel might be too frightening for younger audiences. Once her song "Mother Knows Best" was written, the creative team gained a clearer understanding of Gothel's origins, motivations, and characterization, with the song informing many of their subsequent decisions regarding her story. They eventually realized that passive-aggressiveness was key to balancing Gothel's dual role as a mother figure and villain. By portraying her as subtly manipulative rather than openly cruel toward Rapunzel, they realized they could make her villainy apparent to audiences without undermining the heroine's emotional connection to her. They also designed Gothel's tower to appear warm and inviting, as though the character had deliberately created it to make her "child" believe she would never want to leave.

Seeking inspiration for Gothel and Rapunzel's unconventional relationship, Greno and Howard interviewed several female employees about their relationships with their own mothers, specifically asking them to identify qualities they found cloying, restrictive, or overbearing. The "Mother Knows Best" line "Getting kind of chubby" was borrowed directly from one of these interviews. Although Gothel ultimately embodies "the darker side" of overprotective parenting, her relationship with Rapunzel initially appears more traditional and affectionate. Executive producer John Lasseter believes Gothel is "one of the best villains we’ve ever created".

=== Voice ===
The directors prioritized casting actors who were right for their roles over hiring major movie stars. They also considered the ability to perform well both independently and collaboratively an important asset. Gothel proved difficult to cast. They auditioned several actors they considered strong candidates for Gothel but ultimately concluded that their voices sounded either too young or too close in age to Rapunzel's voice actress, Mandy Moore.

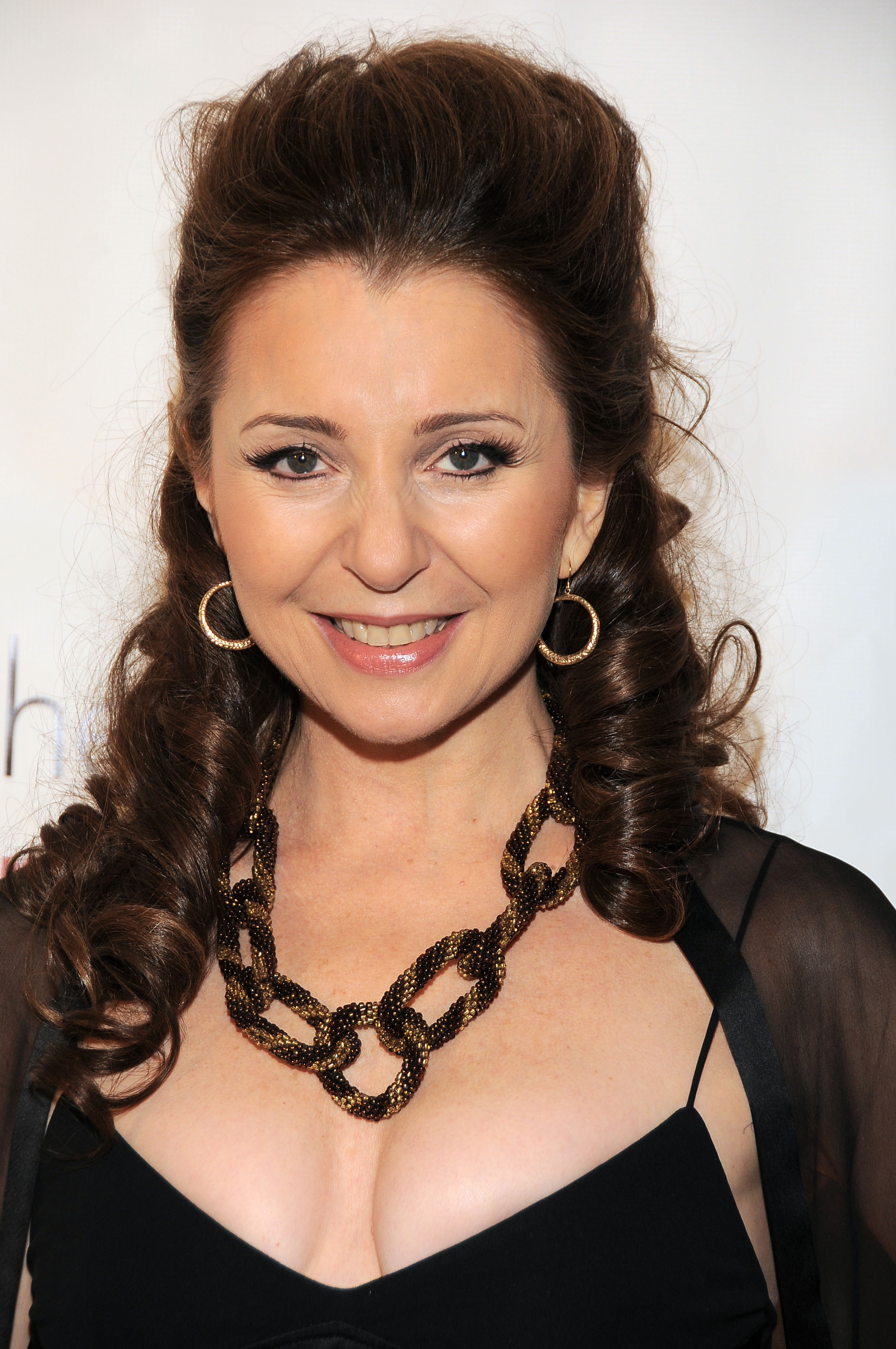
Mother Gothel is voiced by actress Donna Murphy in her voice acting debut.

Mother Gothel is voiced by American actress and singer Donna Murphy, who learned about Tangled's casting call through her agent. Having never voiced an animated character before, Murphy decided to audition for the film's villain, believing the unfamiliar experience would be fun. She immediately developed a strong affinity for Gothel because of the character's complexity. Murphy, primarily a Broadway performer, prepared for her audition in a manner similar to a Broadway audition, including fabricating additional background for Gothel that "flush[ed] out the moments beyond what we see in the film". Although Greno and Howard already knew Murphy was a capable singer, she was still required to audition with a song unrelated to the film, choosing to perform "Children Will Listen" from the stage musical Into the Woods. Howard revealed that Murphy was ultimately selected from hundreds of candidates because she brought "something extra" to the role, particularly noting her charisma and intelligence.

Despite growing up a fan of Disney films, Murphy had never envisioned herself playing a princess, instead preferring adventurous, action-oriented characters. She considers villains among Disney's most dynamic characters because they are typically unbound by ethics, moral codes, or concern for others' feelings and opinions, which she finds liberating as an actor. Although Murphy was never provided with a complete script due to privacy concerns, the directors shared early concepts and ideas about Gothel with her, which she found helpful. Howard recalled that, during one of their first meetings, Murphy spent several hours asking in-depth questions about Gothel's mindset and backstory before reflecting on what she had learned for several days and returning to record. Murphy approached the role as she would a live-action or stage performance. Although the directors provided specific vocal direction during recording, including adjustments to her delivery and tone, Murphy relied on physical acting and character preparation to develop her performance. Comparing voice acting to Broadway, Murphy explained that, unlike stage performances, which typically allow actors several weeks of rehearsal to refine their work, animation requires actors to discover and deliver their performances simultaneously. Musically, the filmmakers were receptive to Murphy's ideas, allowing her to suggest changes to the arrangement when she felt that a musical passage needed a different ending.

Murphy never worked with Moore directly; instead, scenes between Gothel and Rapunzel were recorded with one of the directors impersonating Moore. At first, Murphy found it challenging to perform without being able to react or respond to other actors, but adapted by imagining Rapunzel's voice in her mind. The directors explained to Murphy that Gothel's design will continue to evolve as the character begins to adapt the actress' mannerisms. They also recorded all of her sessions on video, which the animators referenced when creating Gothel's facial expressions and movements. According to Howard, approximately 90% of Murphy's original material and takes were used in the final film. In November 2010, ahead of the film's release, Disney uploaded behind-the-scenes footage of Murphy recording dialogue for the film.

=== Characterization and design ===
According to the filmmakers' character description for Gothel, they wanted her to be as funny as she was frightening, portraying her as a commanding and powerful presence who could convey warmth when necessary. Greno considered Gothel particularly frightening because she is not a witch, describing her instead as "a real-world-type villain". Greno and Howard wanted Gothel to be depicted as a conniving villain who is likeable and charismatic enough that audiences would believe her and Rapunzel's unconventional relationship. According to Howard, because she is subtle and not overtly villainous for much of the film, Gothel is an elusive character who can elicit sympathy despite having made several morally questionable decisions. Murphy believed that Gothel genuinely loved Rapunzel in her own way, viewing their relationship as the only meaningful one the character had sustained throughout her life. She also believed that Gothel could not help but be drawn to Rapunzel's charm and creativity, which was not her original intention. Murphy described her as "a very lonely woman who really did not know how to have a relationship of any kind".

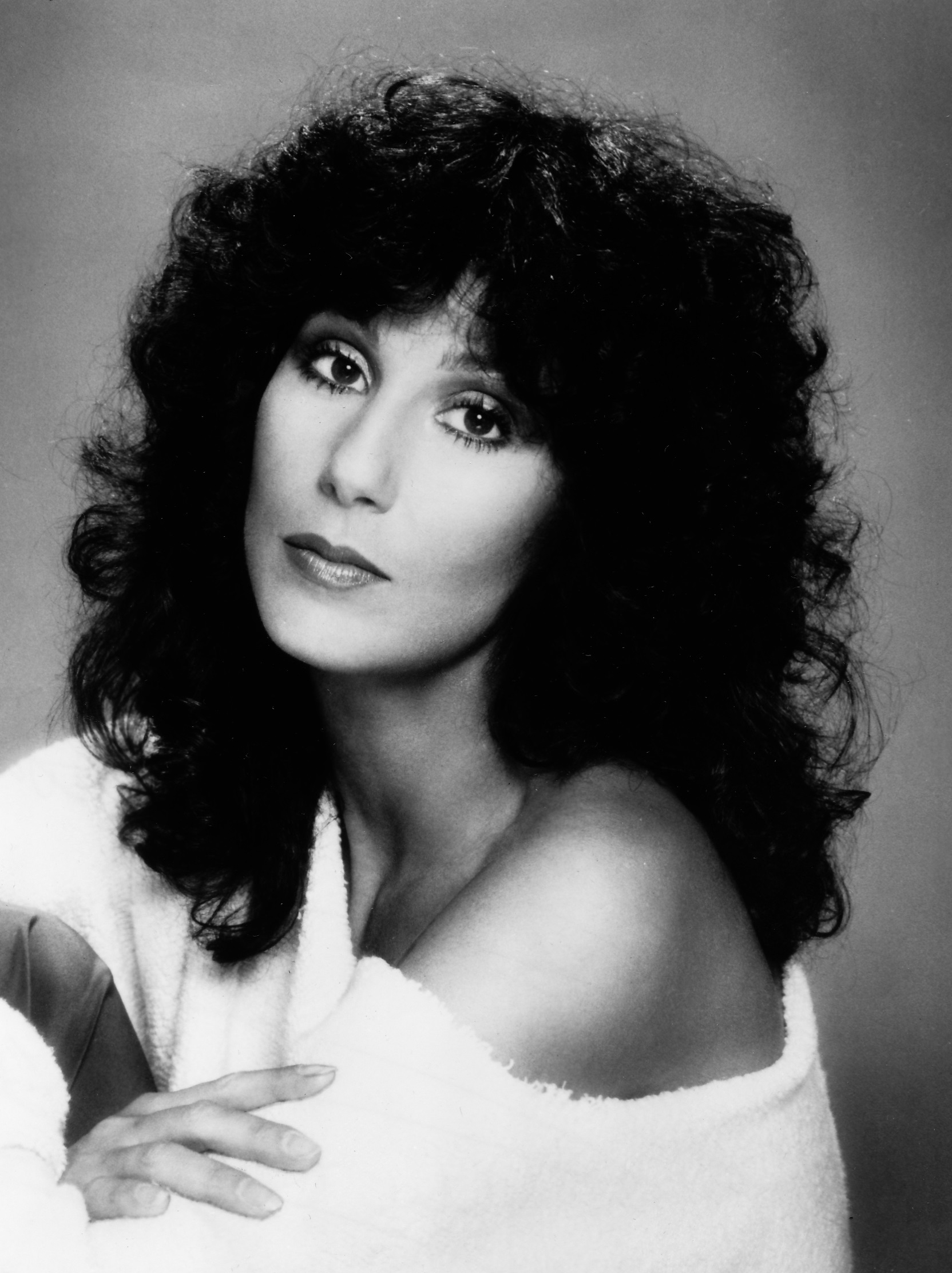
Gothel's appearance was based on American singer Cher.

Character designer Shiyoon Kim attempted to convey Gothel's duality as both a mother and a villain through line work and shapes, initially drawing her with a cuter appearance because he believed it would help prevent her from looking overtly villainous. Animator Jin Kim initially struggled with the idea of a selfish yet motherly figure to Rapunzel until he heard "Mother Knows Best" for the first time, from which he derived a "1940s Hollywood screen siren motif" for Gothel. Thus, he incorporated thick mascara, lipstick, a colorful dress, and long sleeves to evoke what he described as "a very 'actor' type of personality". The character's design underwent several revisions, with Kim spending approximately two years refining Gothel's appearance. Although the final version most closely resembles Howard's designs, according to Kim, it also combines concept art drawn by Keane early in the film's development with elements of Kim's own work. The animators studied footage of Murphy's recording sessions to reference her facial expressions and gestures. The directors confirmed that Gothel's physical appearance was also inspired by American singer Cher, particularly her exotic, gothic-inspired, and striking features.

When Gothel and Rapunzel share scenes, the directors strived to make it clear that the two characters are not biologically related, particularly in contrast to Rapunzel's appearances with her birth parents. They cited differences in their body proportions, hair, skin pigmentation, and Gothel's "very exotic look" as visual evidence of their contrasting appearances. They also used colder lighting when Gothel is in frame, versus Rapunzel's bright, cheerful lighting, and further distinguished the characters through their costumes, dressing Gothel in a Renaissance-inspired gown based on fashions from approximately 400 years before the film's setting. At the same time, however, they realized that Gothel also needed to be beautiful, otherwise her lack of a biological relationship with Rapunzel would be too obvious. To emphasize Gothel's smothering relationship with Rapunzel, the animators incorporated more hugging and physical contact than would typically be featured in an animated film, requiring different materials to rub and interact with one another despite the difficulty of animating such interactions. For example, Gothel's long sleeves frequently interact with Rapunzel's hair. Another challenge arose when Rapunzel's hair is cut and Gothel rapidly ages from approximately 40 to over 80 years old. The animators referenced photographs of the same individuals at different stages of their lives to ensure that Gothel's aging process remained faithful and realistic. Initial attempts to age the character using the same mesh and topology resulted in a version that appeared too realistic, skeletal, and corpse-like, which the animators resolved by removing unnecessary wrinkles and simplifying the model.

== Reception ==
Mother Gothel has received a mostly positive reception from film critics. Nigel Andrews of the Financial Times felt the character had been given the film's "best lines and tunes". Film4 called Gothel fun to the point where "she risks making the good guys seem a bit dull", and Georgie Hobbs of Little White Lies named her the film's "pierre de resistance". IGN's Jim Vejvoda said she "nearly steals the show, with her overprotective tyranny being made to seem almost rational". Writing for the Milwaukee Journal Sentinel, Cathy Jakicic called the character "a great contemporary villain" who "many daughters (and mothers) will find ... funny and a little too familiar". In The New York Times' A. O. Scott's found Gothel's "sheer sadistic intensity" unmatched by previous Disney stepmothers. Jake Coyle of the Southtown Star called Gothel "one of Disney's best" villains, while Michael Smith of the Tulsa World described Gothel as "perfectly wicked". Kirk Baird of The Blade identified Gothel as the film's "strongest character". Several comparisons have been made between Gothel and the Evil Queen in Disney's Snow White and the Seven Dwarfs (1937). Colin Covert of the Star Tribune and Helen O'Hara of Empire agreed that Gothel's ability to evoke fear despite her lack of supernatural powers made her all the more impressive and admirable as a villain. Kenneth Lowe of Paste called her "one of the most contemptible Disney villainesses in a while", whose death "belongs in the top 15 if not the top 10". Mandy Wardrop of Her Campus encouraged viewers to study Gothel's behavior to recognize instances of gaslighting in their own lives, which can often go unnoticed.

Some reviewers felt that Gothel was too passive and tame to be an effective villain. Jeff Meyers of the Detroit Metro Times dismissed Gothel as not "all that villainous", while Tyler Hanley of the Palo Alto Daily News called her "too one-dimensional and generic". PopMatters' Bill Gibron found her inferior to the likes of Maleficent or Cruella de Vil. Some U-T San Diego contributors felt that Gothel was annoying at times, and USA Today's Claudia Puig said she was only sometimes convincing. Although Michelle Orange of Movieline liked Gothel's personality to an extent, the critic found the film lacking in dramatic impact "By reducing Mother Gothel to a vain woman who doesn't want immortality so much as she's determined to keep her profile taut". In The Hollywood Reporter, Todd McCarthy felt that although Gothel could not quite compete with the likes of the Evil Queen or the Wicked Witch of the West, she remained "a formidable first cousin", bolstered by Murphy's "dynamite performance". Steven D. Greydanus of the National Catholic Register argued that although Gothel's actions may not constitute the greatest or most dangerous crime in the Disney canon, her sociopathic narcissism is arguably among the most disturbing.

Murphy's performance received widespread acclaim. Time's Richard Corliss found Murphy's voice acting Tony Award-worthy, saying it "makes Gothel one of the most potent schemers in the Disney canon". David Edelstein of Vulture called her "Broadway's gift to animated movies”. Lisa Schwarzbaum of Entertainment Weekly dubbed her "a firecracker" among an otherwise "sedate" cast. Joe Morgenstern of The Wall Street Journal and Joe Neumaier of the Daily News found her deliciously evil. Tim Robey of The Daily Telegraph, who compared Murphy to Julie Andrews, said she "makes Mother Gothel into a memorable manipulative diva". Jonathan Crocker of Total Film said Murphy does "marvellous" work, and the Tampa Bay Times' Steve Persall believed "Nobody but Murphy should be cast as Gothel". Simon Reynolds of Digital Spy felt that she "steals the show". Quickflix deemed Murphy "wonderful", while Stephen Witty of The Star-Ledger' called her "terrific". Sandie Angulo Chen of Common Sense Media opined, "As for the dramatic tension, it's best in the form of Mother Gothel – brilliantly played by Murphy, whose signature Broadway voice ... adds the necessary punch". The A.V. Club's Tasha Robinson wrote that Gothel was "magnificently voiced by star Murphy". Bill Graham of Collider said the actress "provides the perfect mixture that makes Mother Gothel so haunting" and that the character's lack of magical powers "makes her one of the best villains in the heritage of Disney". Scholar Thomas S. Hischak described Murphy as superb at conveying Gothel's duality as both a nurturing mother and an insidious villain, despite her lack of film and television experience.

Several critics also praised Murphy's performance of "Mother Knows Best", including Peter Travers of Rolling Stone. Linda Cook of the Quad-City Times said Murphy "makes the purchase of the soundtrack worthwhile". Slant Magazine's Christian Blauvelt, who found the film's songs and vocals otherwise lacking, said "it's a different story" when Murphy sings. Canoe.ca's Lindsey Ward wrote that Murphy turns the song "into a giant spectacle with her voice, a powerful force to be reckoned with".

Gothel has appeared on several media rankings of Disney villains, including third by The Mary Sue, fourth on IGN's list of the "12 Disney Villainesses", ninth on Odeon Cinemas's list, 11th on Den of Geek's list of the best animated Disney villains, 17th on PureWow's and Grazia's rankings, and 25th on E!'s list of the 33 greatest Disney villains. Den of Geek's David Crow credited the film's directors with reviving the "evil stepmother shtick" for the 21st century.

== In other media ==
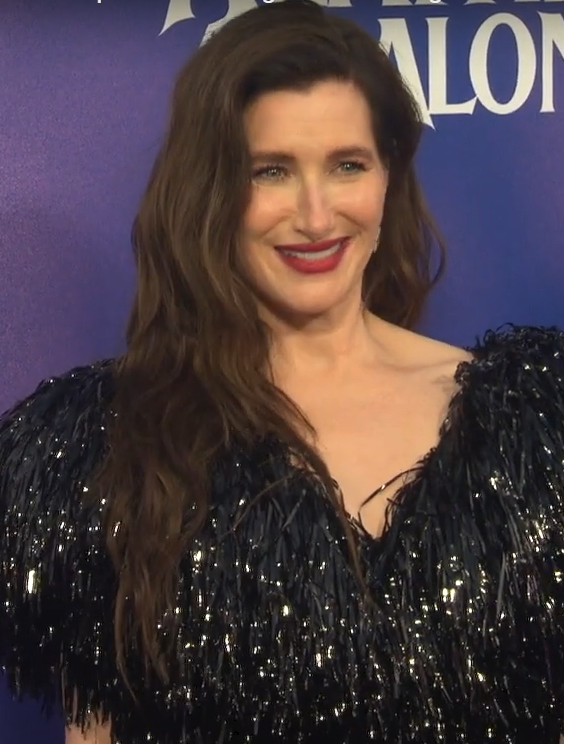
Kathryn Hahn will portray Mother Gothel in the 2028 live-action remake of Tangled.

Having died six months before the events of the film, Mother Gothel appears in Tangled: Before Ever After (2017) as a painting in Rapunzel's bedchamber. She is also referenced in dialogue when Eugene (Note: At the end of Tangled, Flynn Rider adopts the name "Eugene Fitzherbert", which was initially believed to be his birth name until it was later retconned.) recounts her kidnapping Rapunzel and imprisoning her in the tower. Later, Rapunzel references her experience with Gothel when confronted by the film's antagonist, Lady Cain. Gothel is referenced throughout the television series Rapunzel's Tangled Adventure, appearing in several dream sequences and hallucinations. The series also reveals that she was the biological mother of Rapunzel's best friend and handmaiden, Cassandra, whom she abandoned as a child while pursuing Rapunzel's magical hair.

Beginning in 2015, the role was originated by Katie Whetsell in a stage adaptation of the film produced for Disney Cruise Line's Disney Magic. An alternate version of Gothel appears in the seventh season of television series Once Upon a Time, portrayed by Emma Booth. In the show, she is a tree nymph who inherits the title of Mother Nature and eventually assumes the identity of Eloise Gardener. In 2026, Kathryn Hahn was cast as Gothel in Disney's upcoming live-action remake of Tangled.

Gothel has appeared in a variety of merchandise and tie-ins for Tangled and the wider Disney franchise, including dolls, toys, and other collectibles. Her likeness has also been featured in Disney's Disney Villains Designer Collection. She is featured in the 2010 video game adaptation of Tangled. Gothel appears as a playable character in the video game Disney Magic Kingdoms (2016), where she initially serves as the third boss of the game's main storyline before becoming unlockable. She appears in Kingdom Hearts III (2019), with Murphy reprising her role. Her role in the game largely mirrors her role in Tangled. She allies with Marluxia to keep Rapunzel imprisoned in the tower as part of Xehanort's plan to create the χ-blade from Rapunzel's heart. After Gothel is killed, Marluxia transforms her into the Heartless Grim Guardianess, which serves as a boss in a battle against Sora. She also appears in the video game Disney Dreamlight Valley (2023), where she can be unlocked by clearing the Night Thorns that block access to the Glade of Trust biome. Beginning with the season 19 Villainous Ever After update, Gothel became available as a playable character in the kart racing game Disney Speedstorm (2023).

In Mother Knows Best: A Tale of the Old Witch (2018), the fifth book in author Serena Valentino's Villains series, an alternate backstory for Gothel is explored, focusing on her childhood with her witch mother, her relationship with her sisters, and her discovery of the magical golden flower. In the subsequent book, The Odd Sisters, Gothel is revealed to be the younger sister of the titular characters.
