= Flynn Rider =

Fictional character from 2010 film Tangled

- Tangled character
- Flynn Rider as he appears in Disney's Tangled.
- First appearance: Tangled (2010)
- Created by: Dan Fogelman: Nathan Greno; Byron Howard
- Voice: Zachary Levi; Sean Giambrone (teen; Rapunzel's Tangled Adventure)
- Portrayer: Nick Pankuch (Tangled: The Musical); Milo Manheim (live-action film)
- Inspired by: The Prince from the Brothers Grimm's fairy tale

In-universe information
- Full name: Eugene Fitzherbert
- Alias: Flynn Rider
- Title: Prince of Corona
- Occupation: Thief (at the beginning of Tangled)
- Family: King Edmund (father); Queen of the Dark Kingdom (mother)
- Spouse: Rapunzel
- Relatives: King Frederic (father-in-law); Queen Arianna (mother-in-law); Mother Gothel (acting mother-in-law); Cassandra (foster sister-in-law); Willow (aunt-in-law)
- Nationality: Dark Kingdom

Eugene Fitzherbert, known by the alias Flynn Rider, is a fictional character who appears in Walt Disney Animation Studios' animated film Tangled (2010), its short 2012 film Tangled Ever After, and the 2017 television series Rapunzel's Tangled Adventure (previously titled Tangled: The Series). The character is voiced by American actor Zachary Levi, who decided to audition for the role upon learning that he would also be providing the character's singing voice. Levi's duet with singer and co-star Mandy Moore, "I See the Light", would go on to become the actor's first professionally recorded song and musical debut.

Loosely based on the prince in the Brothers Grimm fairy tale "Rapunzel", Flynn is a wanted thief who seeks refuge in Rapunzel's tower after stealing a crown. Blackmailed by Rapunzel into taking her to see the kingdom's floating lanterns in time for her eighteenth birthday, Flynn undergoes a change of heart as he gradually begins to fall in love with Rapunzel. Flynn was created by screenwriter Dan Fogelman and directors Nathan Greno and Byron Howard because they felt that the incarcerated Rapunzel needed someone to escort her out of the tower. He was conceived as a thief as opposed to a traditional prince in favor of making him a funnier and edgier character. Originally written as a British farmer, Flynn was ultimately developed into a swashbuckling thief inspired by fictional characters Han Solo and Indiana Jones, and actors Gene Kelly and Errol Flynn; the alias Flynn Rider was named after the latter.

Flynn has divided film critics. While some reviewers enjoyed the character's refreshing humor, rebelliousness and sarcasm in comparison to traditional Disney princes, others found his personality to be annoying and obnoxious, while panning his narration. Additionally, Flynn has also been strongly accused of being a marketing tool exploited by Disney to attract a larger male audience to Tangled. However, both the character's romantic comedy-esque relationship with Rapunzel and Levi's vocal performance have received widespread acclaim.

== Development ==
=== Conception ===
Filmmaker Walt Disney himself had first attempted to adapt the Brothers Grimm fairy tale "Rapunzel" into a feature-length animated film during the 1930s and 1940s. However, the project was eventually abandoned because the original fairy tale was considered too "small". When they were first approached to direct Tangled in 2008, directors Nathan Greno and Byron Howard decided that it would be best "to blow up the scale of the film" and transform it into a "big event", while updating and modernizing the story for a new audience. Flynn was conceived because the directors felt that "Rapunzel needed to get out [of the tower] ... So she needed to meet a guy to take her to where she's going." In the original fairy tale, Rapunzel's love interest is a prince. However, Greno and Howard decided to make him a thief – dubbed "a subtle yet startling twist for Disney" by The New York Times – to avoid creating a character who is too "safe", opting for a funnier and "edgier" antihero instead. Greno elaborated, "When you look back at some of the past Disney princes ... a lot of them are kind of soft and they're not like people we think are that cool," continuing, "They're good guys, so I guess we sort of took that to the other extreme." However, some of the filmmakers themselves were concerned that Flynn was becoming too edgy. Greno revealed that "There were people ... who were a little worried because they were hearing these rumors, 'Well, it's not a prince it's a thief. He's kind of a ladies' man, and he's very arrogant.'" Greno summarized Flynn's conception and development to Orange:

When we were putting it together and trying to figure out who Flynn Rider was in this movie, we looked at a bunch of different sources ... When you look back at some of the past Disney princes or something, a lot of them are kind of soft and they're not like people we think are that cool, I guess. They're good guys, so I guess we sort of took that to the other extreme. We like cocky, arrogant sort of characters, and I think there were people in our building that were a little worried because we were up in the story room and they were hearing these rumours of, well, it's not a prince, it's a thief, and he's kind of a ladies' man and he's very arrogant ... But, I think the trick is when you're creating a character like that, if you have this cocky character, you have to hit him over the head with a frying pan a dozen times or something, and he needs to kind of pay for being that way. Those characters, if they're done right, can be so funny. On the flip side, if they're not done right, they can be really off putting.

— Director Nathan Greno on Flynn's conception and subsequent development.

Originally, Flynn was conceived as a British farmer named Bastian until his voice actor was finally cast. The directors cited actors Errol Flynn and Gene Kelly, and Star Wars character Han Solo, among several individuals by whom Flynn was inspired. Greno explained that "Having Flynn as a thief seemed like a fresh spin, especially in contrast to Rapunzel, who is a really smart girl but is just locked away in this tower. So she has a very limited world view and Flynn could complement that as this worldly guy." The film's change in title from Rapunzel to the more gender-neutral Tangled is due in part to Flynn's role and involvement. First observing that the Disney tradition is "to name the movie after the Princess", the directors had initially thought that the film "would be structured like Cinderella where there's Cinderella and then a Prince that pops into the movie once in a while". This changed, however, as Flynn was gradually developed into a much more prominent character. Howard explained that "When Nathan and I figured out that this film was really about two characters, Flynn and Rapunzel, we knew that changing the title would be a good idea." Meanwhile, the title Tangled summarizes the relationship between protagonists Flynn and Rapunzel, and antagonist Mother Gothel. Additionally, Flynn also narrates the film, providing it with "an ironic counterpoint", according to Children's Literature and Learner Empowerment: Children and Teenagers in English Language Education author Janice Bland. As "an example of first-person voice-over narration", Flynn's narration "compels the viewer to identify empathetically with" Flynn and Rapunzel.

=== Voice ===
Greno and Howard were not particularly interested in casting solely A-list actors as the voices of main characters Flynn and Rapunzel. Instead, the directors simply searched for actors who had "the right voice" for these characters. Writing for ReelViews, film critic James Berardinelli felt that the directors' decision mirrored "Disney's approach during the late 1980s and early 1990s, when big name stars were often bypassed in favor of lesser known talents". Hundreds of actors and singers auditioned and were considered for the role of Rapunzel's love interest, among them comedian Dan Fogler and American Idol alum Clay Aiken. However, the role of Flynn Rider was ultimately won by American actor Zachary Levi because he, according to Greno, "nailed" his audition. Levi auditioned for the role after he first received a telephone call from his agent informing him about the film. Identifying himself as "a huge Disney nut", Levi was immediately "sold" on the project. His interest was further cemented by the fact that he would also be providing the character's singing voice. Additionally, Levi appears to have a history playing male "characters who are surrounded by tough, strong women". Required to audition a song in the style of a singer-songwriter, Levi decided to perform James Taylor's "Sweet Baby James" for the directors.

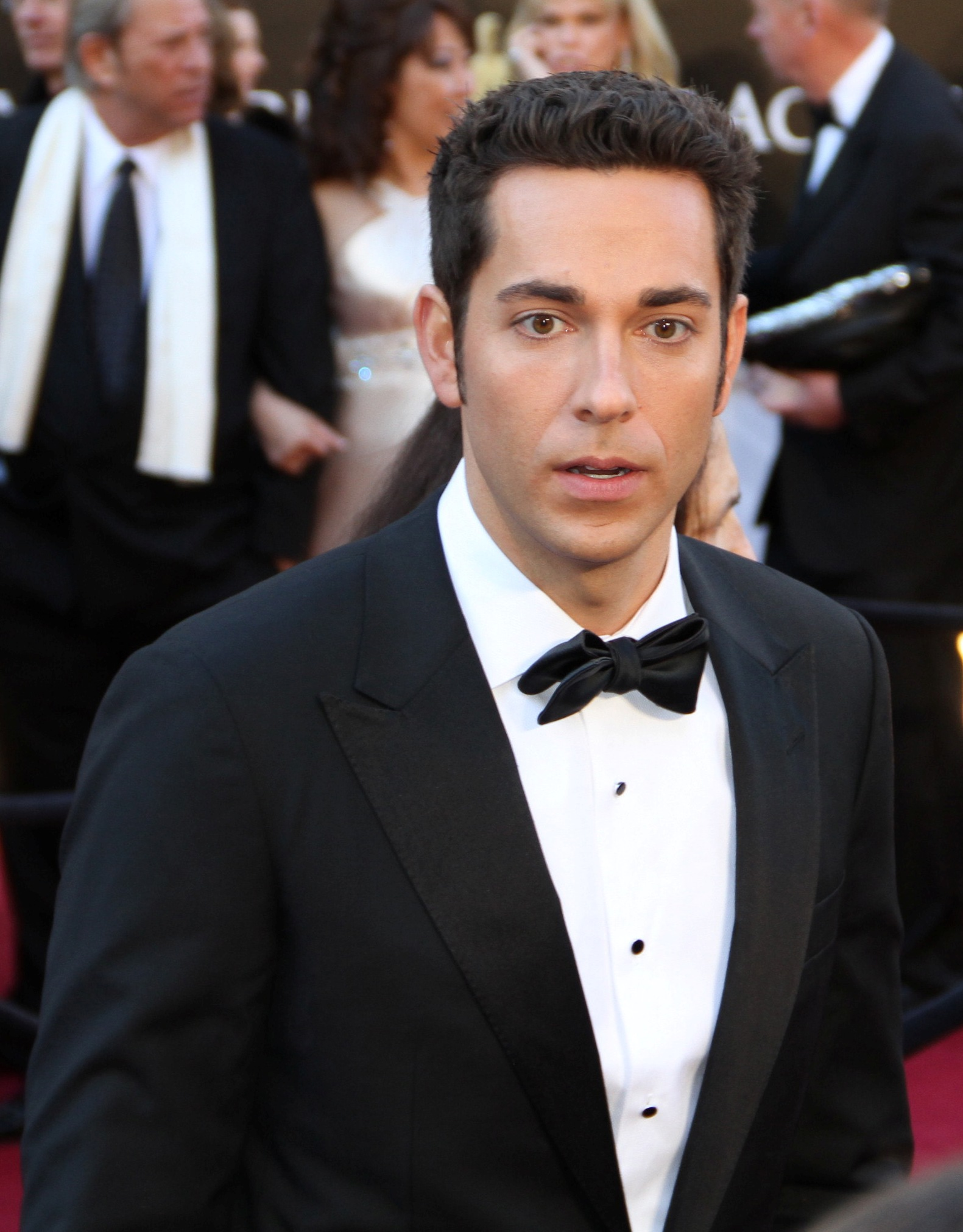
Flynn is voiced by American actor Zachary Levi, whose Academy Award-nominated duet with pop singer Mandy Moore, "I See the Light", marked his musical debut.

When Levi was first cast as the voice of Flynn, the character had been scripted as a British farmer at the time, requiring Levi to voice him with a British accent until Flynn was eventually developed into a bandit with an American accent. Although Flynn and Rapunzel share several scenes together during the film, Levi and singer Mandy Moore, his co-star who provides the voice of Rapunzel, recorded virtually none of their dialogue together due to scheduling conflicts, which Levi cited as one of the challenges he endured while working on the film, in addition to having to star in the television series Chuck simultaneously. Levi's starring role on Chuck required the actor to constantly "shed a character and take on another character and shed that character and then go back to something else". However, Levi and Moore did meet on one occasion to record their romantic duet "I See the Light", Levi was not intimidated by the thought of recording the song, describing the experience as "an added bonus". However, he admitted to having been nervous to sing with Moore, a professional singer, and working with composer Alan Menken. Although the actor identifies himself as "no stranger to singing" due to his background in musical theatre, Levi's performance of "I See the Light" is considered to be his "big singing debut" because it was his first time recording a song professionally.

It took Levi approximately one year to record all of his dialogue due in part to his busy schedule. Levi recorded once every six weeks for six hours at a time, recording each of his lines at least twice. The actor's voice ultimately helped shape and develop Flynn's character. Howard explained, "He's so smart and clever, and his adlibs are so great, and you like him straight away ... he brings that to Flynn." On Levi's own influence on his character, the actor explained that Flynn's "voice was really just a slight variation of [his] own". Wanting to sound "more appropriate" for the film's medieval setting, Levi "cleaned up [his] own diction and made things a little bit more polished", referring to Flynn's accent as mid-Atlantic. Describing Tangled as a "very family friendly" version of Romancing the Stone (1984), Levi studied and channelled the film's star, American actor Michael Douglas, and English legend Robin Hood. However, when Levi heard his performance in its entirety for the first time after the film's release, the actor admitted that he was ultimately dissatisfied with his performance, explaining, "I felt like I sounded incredibly nasally and I was plugged up," likening the experience to hearing one's voice played back on an answering machine.

=== Characterization, design and analysis ===
Greno and Howard wanted Flynn to be funny and sarcastic as opposed to snarky. One occasion in particular involved an animator having Flynn respond to Rapunzel's excitement by simply walking away from her in silence. The directors did not like this because, according to Greno, Flynn "did this reaction where [he] treated her like she's nuts". Although both directors agreed that Flynn's reaction was funny, Greno and Howard wanted the characters to "connect" emotionally during this scene. Screenwriter Dan Fogelman said that Flynn is "at his best ... when he's playing little mind games with other people and entertaining himself along with them", likening him to English actor Cary Grant. Fogelman concluded, "At his heart, he's really kind of a lost soul who doesn't quite know what he wants and who he is." Howard cited fictional characters Ferris Bueller and Indiana Jones as influences because these characters, like Flynn, "are skilled but have a human side to them". Flynn is considered an antihero because "He is quick-witted and agile, stealing to survive" and "he is also extremely narcissistic".

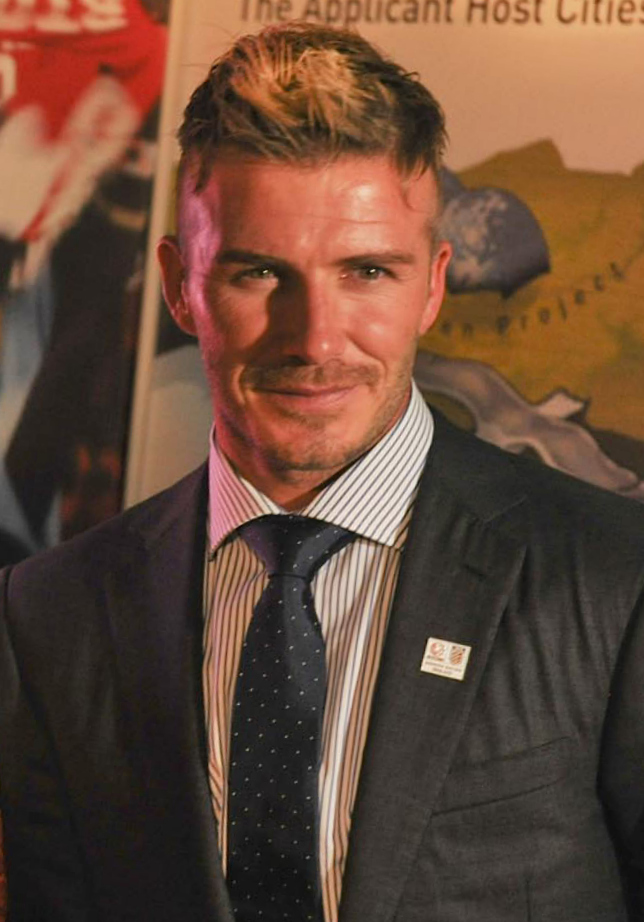
Professional footballer David Beckham are among several individuals who influenced the character's personality and appearance.

Originally, the character resembled a "burlier leading man", described by Greno as "a muscular commoner/farm boy". However, the directors had always envisioned Flynn as "a dashing thief". To assist with the development of Flynn's design, Howard and Greno held a large meeting with thirty of Tangled's female employees. Calling it the "Hot Man Meeting", the employees were encouraged to "bring in pictures of their favorite hunky men". The Hot Man Meeting was created because the directors, who found that they were very much impressed with Rapunzel's design, felt that "Flynn [needed] to be up to [Rapunzel's] level". Greno described the Hot Man Meeting as "crazy", elaborating, "Photos of all the hottest men in Hollywood [were] being thrown around a room. Photos being torn in half and pasted back together. Eyes were ripped from one picture and put on another. Heads were torn from photos," concluding, "I've never seen anything like it." Howard cited American actor Clark Gable and English footballer David Beckham among several celebrities by whom Flynn was influenced during the meeting, joking that the employees eventually "started using Nathan and me as examples of what not to do".

Defending Flynn's personality, Levi explained that "Deep down, Flynn has a good core, although that characteristic is brought out of him through the purity, love and naiveté of Rapunzel." The actor concluded that "These are two very different characters that end up learning a lot from each other on a rather crazy adventure." According to Colin Covert of the Star Tribune, Flynn "teaches [Rapunzel] about courage". Rob Vaux of Mania.com described the character's relationship with Rapunzel as a "partners-in-crime sort of chemistry, filled with mischief and the odd pratfall while establishing a rhythm wholly their own." Rapunzel eventually convinces Flynn to go by his birth name, Eugene Fitzherbert, which Conny Eisfeld described in her book How Fairy Tales Live Happily Ever After: (Analyzing) The Art of Adapting Fairy Tales as "more humane". Stephen D. Greydanus of Decent Films Guide called Flynn "a charismatic bad boy", comparing him to Sinbad from DreamWorks' Sinbad: Legend of the Seven Seas (2003). Similarly, The New York Times' Brooks Barnes felt that "Making the leading man an unlikable thief is a subtle yet startling twist for Disney, and Flynn ... is glib in a way that many people now associate with DreamWorks." On Flynn's thievery, Entertainment Weekly's Lisa Schwarzbaum determined that the character "only steals because he's basically a nice-guy underachiever who needs a better outlet for his leadership abilities". According to Tison Pugh, author of The Disney Middle Ages: A Fairy-Tale and Fantasy Past, Flynn "amalgamates the comedy-action hero with the swashbuckling romantic sensations of Errol Flynn, layering them over a fairy-tale hero attributed with comedic lines that undermine the romantic nostalgia of the film's setting", while serving as a source of comic relief at times. Steve Persall of the Tampa Bay Times believes that Flynn carries "most of the [film's] modern humor". Likewise, Jennie Punter of The Globe and Mail described Flynn as the film's "main source of action, humour and, eventually, romance".

== Appearances ==
Flynn debuted in Tangled (2010) as a sought-after bandit who discovers refuge in Rapunzel's secluded tower after stealing a crown. There, he is captured and blackmailed by Rapunzel, who hides the crown to convince Flynn to guide her to the floating lanterns in time for her eighteenth birthday, while Mother Gothel, her vain, controlling kidnapper, is absent. Flynn is pursued by a police horse named Maximus; the vengeful Stabbington brothers, two betrayed accomplices of his; and Gothel, who grows increasingly obsessed with retrieving Rapunzel to continue using her magic hair to stay immortal. Meanwhile, Flynn falls in love with Rapunzel and undergoes a change of heart. He attempts to reconcile with the Stabbington Brothers, but they hand him over to the officials, who sentence him to death, while Gothel takes Rapunzel away. Maximus helps Flynn escape and return to Rapunzel's tower to rescue her. Flynn finds Rapunzel tied up and gagged, and Gothel fatally stabs him before he can help. Rapunzel convinces Gothel to let her use her hair to heal Flynn, promising to be Gothel's slave forever if she is allowed to do so. A dying Flynn protests the deal, and cuts off Rapunzel's hair with a shard of glass when she tries to heal him. Gothel withers and disappears when the hair is cut, and Flynn dies, but Rapunzel's tear contains enough magic to revive him. He returns Rapunzel to her birth parents, the King and Queen, who grant Flynn a full pardon. He and Rapunzel later marry and he vows to turn over a new leaf and give up thieving.

Flynn appears in the five-minute short film Tangled Ever After, which focuses on his marriage to Rapunzel. The plot follows Pascal and Maximus as they lose the wedding rings and make a frenzied search to recover them.

Flynn also appears in the 2017 television series Rapunzel's Tangled Adventure. It takes place between the feature film and the short Tangled Ever After. Over the course of the series, Flynn struggles with trying to find the perfect moment to propose to Rapunzel, eventually deciding to wait until she is ready. The series also brings to light some of Flynn's past and former friends, revealing more of his backstory. Later, the Captain of the Guards, who initially disliked Flynn, steps down from his position and promotes Flynn to the spot, much to his surprise. He considers the position before finally accepting the title, forever leaving his criminal past behind him. In the series finale, Flynn finally proposes to Rapunzel in the same spot he fell in love with her; out in the Corona lake on a boat.

Flynn appears in the short film Once Upon a Studio, waiting by the door to the Walt Disney Animation Studios building as Mickey Mouse flies out with Dumbo. He is shown with Rapunzel during the group photo.

Flynn and Rapunzel make a cameo appearance in Frozen, where they are seen joining the guests at Elsa's coronation.

Flynn appears in Kingdom Hearts III, with Zachary Levi reprising the role.

Milo Manheim has been announced to play Flynn Rider in a live-action film adaptation of the 2010 film.

== Reception ==
=== Critical response ===
Kirk Baird of The Blade described the character as irresistible, while Columbus Alive's Brad Keefe called him "loveable". Georgie Hobbs of Little White Lies lauded Flynn as "a hero invested with enough colour to liven up what could have been a monochromatic role". Margot Harrison of Seven Days concluded that the character is "better than a prince". Meanwhile, Amy Nicholson of Inland Empire Weekly reviewed the character as a significant improvement upon traditional Disney heroes, writing, "If anything, Tangled is hommepowerment—one more step forward in Disney's slow march to treat male suitors like equals, from its early nameless princes ... to here, a dude with a full-on personality and nearly equal screen time." Tyler Hanley of the Palo Alto Weekly observed that "Flynn talks in a laid-back way that helps make his character both likable and relatable". Ian Bunting of the Daily Record concluded that although "Male characters sometimes get shortchanged in Disney movies ... Flynn is one of their better efforts to add to Aladdin, Mowgli and the Beast." Virtually an equal amount of critics were less impressed with Flynn. Anthony Quinn of The Independent described the character as a "fop", while Tom Huddleston of Time Out called him "bland". The Scotsman wrote, "it's a shame the prominence of Rapunzel's wayward love interest ... needlessly distracts from" the film. Michael Phillips of the Chicago Tribune called Flynn "a second-rate Nickelodeon TV punk". Jeff Meyers of the Metro Times dismissed Flynn as not "all that heroic". The Houston Chronicle's Amy Biancolli quipped that Flynn's "sensitive chin fur, and the way he talks out of the side of his mouth – makes him look like Dick Cheney at a poetry slam". The Los Angeles Times'Kenneth Turan believes that the film's "initial shakiness" is "amplified by the irritating and overly glib nature of" Flynn. Accusing the character of "lacking both superficial and emotional individuality", Jake Coyle of the Southtown Star panned Flynn as "rather obnoxious", Dan Kois of The Village Voice dismissed him as "vanilla". Flynn's narration has also been widely panned. Joe Williams of the St. Louis Post-Dispatch referred to it as "flippant". A. O. Scott of The New York Times described it as "annoyingly smart-alecky". Justin Chang of Variety described the character's opening monologue as "clunky". William Goss of Moviefone compared Flynn to "a modern-day Chris Evans/Pine type, and his glib narration – combined with a hasty prologue – almost makes it feel like writer Dan Fogelman is trying too hard to make this a boys' AND girls' club". However, Goss relented, "The voice-over tapers off, though, and Levi proves to be a suitably cocky foil to the neurotic love interest."

Disney presents the Rapunzel/Flynn relationship as gag-strewn romantic comedy – she hits him several times with a frying pan before they have their first conversation. Once they do start talking, however, writers and animators fashion some fairly decent road-movie chemistry – Flynn takes the sheltered Rapunzel out to see the world (and perhaps meet her real parents) in a protective way, she punctures his exterior of false bravado, they fall in love.

— Much of the character's praise was directed towards his relationship with Rapunzel, as mentioned by Gary Thompson of the Philadelphia Daily News.

Meanwhile, critics lauded the character's relationship and chemistry with Rapunzel enthusiastically, likening it to that of a romantic comedy. Writing for the Mountain Xpress, Ken Hanke felt that "what works best is the interplay between the two leads", concluding, "these animated characters are frankly more believable and charismatic than the human ones in ... Love and Other Drugs." Sandie Angulo Chen of Common Sense Media wrote that the characters' "relationship is built on mutual respect and trust, something completely missing in many earlier Disney movies." The Miami Herald's Rene Rodriquez opined, "Even though they may seem to be boilerplate fairy-tale heroes, you genuinely come to care about Rapunzel and Flynn and root for them to be together," while Joe Neumaier of the Daily News simply called their relationship "cute". Ted Fry of The Seattle Times wrote, "The back-and-forth banter of what inevitably becomes a courtship is consistently witty and given extra sparkle from adroit characterizations by Moore and Levi." Similarly, Cathy Jakicic, writing for the Milwaukee Journal Sentinel, opined, "Moore and Levi, meanwhile, breathe new life into the classic love-hate romance." Colin Covert of the Star Tribune felt that both "characters are equally strong and funny". Ann Hornaday of The Washington Post wrote that the characters' relationship makes the film "engaging". BuzzFeed author Arielle Calderon compiled "19 Reasons Rapunzel And Flynn Rider Are The Best Disney Couple", citing their meeting and opposite personalities among them. Babble.com ranked Flynn and Rapunzel among the "Top 10 Cutest Disney Couples".

Levi's performance has garnered widespread acclaim from critics, who enjoyed the actor's comedic delivery and singing voice. Praising the directors' decision to "[bypass] big-name stars in favor of lesser-known talent", TV Guide described Levi's performance as "charming, roguish, and, well, generic enough". Similarly, Mike Scott of The Times-Picayune wrote that Levi "comes off as an exaggerated, narcissistic version of the rascally Tory Belleci from TV's MythBusters", complimenting the fact that "the cast's names are less than household stature". Rafer Guzman of Newsday described Levi's performance as "terrific". ABC Online appreciated the fact that "the voices of the hero and heroine were not recognisable", concluding, "Zachary Levi and Mandy Moore ... do a really good job on the voices". Dustin Hucks of Film School Rejects wrote that Levi "creates a significant amount of range and emotion with his voice that truly makes the suave thief with a heart of gold Flynn pop on the screen". Hucks went on to call Flynn "one the better [Disney heroes] that have come out of the Disney stable in quite a while". Mathew DeKinder of the St. Louis Post-Dispatch appreciated the comedy in Levi's "quick-tongued delivery", while Rolling Stone's Peter Travers wrote that the actor "does a nice job" as Flynn. James Luxford of The National wrote that both Levi and Moore "adeptly flesh out what could have been basic characters", while Digital Spy's Simon Reynolds described Levi as "excellent as the rogueish hero". Stephen Whitty of The Star-Ledger called Levi "a surprisingly perfect choice for the self-mocking Flynn". Also pleasantly surprised, David Nusair of About.com wrote that "Levi effortlessly captures the character's transformation from a vain (yet charismatic) rogue to a compassionate love interest". Praising the actor's singing voice, Jim Vejvoda of IGN described it as "impressive".

Flynn is often regarded as one of Disney's most attractive heroes. In 2012, Vanity Fair conducted a poll for which readers were asked to vote for the sexiest Disney hero of all-time. Pairing Flynn against Prince Eric from The Little Mermaid, Flynn beat his competition by less than one percent, garnering 50.35 percent of the total votes. E! ranked the character third in its article "The Definitive Ranking of Disney Princes Based on Overall Dating Eligibility". Writing for Seventeen, YouTube personality Tyler Oakley ranked Flynn the sixth most "dateable" Disney prince. Oakley joked, "I like a man who is unaplogetically himself", continuing, "If you gotta go around with a fake name ... then you're simply not on my level." BuzzFeed author Louis Peitzman ranked Flynn the fourth most attractive Disney prince, praising the character's hair and eyebrows in 2013. BuzzFeed also ranked Flynn second on the website's list of the "Top Ten Hottest Male Cartoon Characters", calling him a "bad boy with a heart of gold".

=== Marketing controversy and criticism ===
Critics harshly criticized the film's controversial change in title from Rapunzel to Tangled. Holding Flynn's role and characterization partially responsible for it, they accused the character of being a marketing tool manipulated by Disney to attract larger male audiences via the film's trailers. Writing for the Los Angeles Times, Dawn C. Chmielewski observed that Tangled's marketing campaign involved "amp[ing] up the role of the dashing Errol Flynn-styled male lead to share the spotlight with the golden-haired namesake of the classic Brothers Grimm story". Tom Charity of CNN received Flynn as "an attempt to lure boys and men into the theater". One of the film's trailers features Flynn "trying to win over ... Rapunzel by giving her 'the smolder'" while "emphasiz[ing Flynn's] ... action components ... over the more girl-oriented fairy tale stuff", according to Christian Blauvelt of Slant Magazine. Jennie Punter of The Globe and Mail felt that Flynn was "obviously designed to keep the young male audience from spurning yet another princess movie". Richard Corliss of Time mocked the film's marketing and the idea that "The trailers suggest that the movie is an action comedy about a roguish guy ... whose mission is to storm the tower and free the girl inside." Referring to the film's title as "idiotic", Matt Neal of the Standard-Examiner wrote, "Disney claims it changed the film's title from Rapunzel to Tangled to emphasise Flynn Rider's role in the film ... but that title-change excuse doesn't fly." Similarly, A. O. Scott of The New York Times received Flynn as a "hijacking of a princess's tale", panning the character as "a crude commercial calculation, a sign to the anxious boys in the audience that things aren't going to be too girly, or to Disneyphobes that the studio can bring some DreamWorks-style attitude." Claire Martin of The Denver Post felt that Flynn's sole purpose in the film was for potential merchandising opportunities, specifically to "take Ken's role as [Barbie's] male arm candy".

Directors Nathan Greno and Byron Howard disputed reports that the film's title change from Rapunzel to Tangled was a marketing decision. They said the fact that Rapunzel is not the only main character in the film was the reason for the title change. Greno and Howard went on to say that "you cannot call Toy Story "Buzz Lightyear," and they really needed a title that represented what the film is, and that it stars the duo of Rapunzel and Flynn Rider. Empire's Helen O'Hara defended Disney's claim "that the new title reflects the fact that [Tangled] is very much a two-hander, with Mandy Moore's innocent but (inevitably) feisty Rapunzel and Zachary Levi's street-wise yet clueless Flynn sharing the lead". O'Hara went on to argue that both characters "get decent character development too, and base their growing love story on more than a single longing glance". Todd Hertz of Christianity Today observed that "Disney changed the film's title and showcased the swashbuckling Aladdin-meets-Robin-Hood character who replaces the original story's prince", but felt that "Luckily, these marketing moves don't compromise Tangled's phenomenal storytelling or considerable charm. Hertz concluded, "Still, the movie wisely takes a page from Pixar's playbook to fill the movie with so much well-done slapstick humor, action, goofy characters, and genuine fun that boys won't feel like the ads gave them the old bait-and-switch to trick them into a 'girl' movie."
