= Tangled (disambiguation) =

Tangled is a 2010 animated feature film from Disney, adapted from the Brothers Grimm's tale Rapunzel.

Tangled may also refer to:

== Film and television ==
- Tangled (2001 film), an American thriller film
- Tangled (franchise), a Disney franchise, based on the 2010 film
  - Tangled Ever After, a 2012 short film
  - Tangled: The Video Game, a 2010 video game based on the animated film
  - Tangled: The Series, an animated television series based on the animated film
  - Tangled: Before Ever After, a 2017 TV movie
  - Tangled, an upcoming live-action remake of the animated film
- Tangled, a 2010 TV film by Bronwen Hughes

== Music ==
=== Albums ===
- Tangled (Jane Wiedlin album), 1990
- Tangled (soundtrack), score album from the 2010 Disney film by Alan Menken
- Tangled, 2006 album by Jackie Allen
- Tangled (Nick Heyward album), 1995

=== Songs ===
- "Tangled", by Maroon 5 from the album Songs About Jane

== See also ==
- Tangle (disambiguation)
- Tangled Up (disambiguation)
- Entangled (disambiguation)
