= Tangled Up =

Tangled Up may refer to:

- Tangled Up, a re-release of Britannica's Tales Around the World
- Tangled Up (Girls Aloud album), 2007 album by Girls Aloud
  - Tangled Up Tour, album's supporting concert tour
- Tangled Up (Thomas Rhett album), 2015 album by Thomas Rhett
- "Tangled Up" (Caro Emerald song), a 2013 song by Dutch jazz singer Caro Emerald
- "Tangled Up" (New Found Glory song)
- "Tangled Up", a 2007 song by Shayne Ward from Breathless

== See also ==
- Tangled (disambiguation)
- Tangled Up in Blue (disambiguation)
