= List of Tangled characters =

The following is a list of characters from the franchise Tangled which includes the 2010 film of the same name, Tangled Ever After (2012), Tangled: Before Ever After (2017), as well as the 2017-2020 television series Rapunzel's Tangled Adventure which was previously titled Tangled: The Series.

The franchise takes the classic Brothers Grimm fairy tale character Rapunzel and expands on the surrounding world with new characters and settings.

== Introduced in film ==
=== Rapunzel ===
Princess Rapunzel (voiced by Mandy Moore and Kelsey Lansdowne in Kingdom Hearts III), born with magical healing hair as the result of the power of the sun drop, was kidnapped by Mother Gothel so she could use the power of Rapunzel's hair. Growing up, her hair was never cut (since doing so destroys its power); by the time she was 18, it was 70 feet long. Rapunzel eventually escapes with Flynn Rider and goes on an adventure that changes her life. Always optimistic and searching for the brighter side of things, Rapunzel does all she can to help her friends and family by showing that nothing can keep her down.

=== Flynn Rider ===
Eugene Fitzherbert, born Horace and better known as Flynn Rider, (voiced by Zachary Levi), was abandoned by his father in order to protect him. Flynn grew up as a cocky thief. His luck changed when he found himself unwillingly rescuing Rapunzel from a tall tower. Since then, he has fallen in love with her and has changed his ways to be by her side by protecting her at all costs until he eventually weds her. He is shown to prefer Eugene as his name in Tangled the Series.

=== Pascal ===
Pascal (voiced by Frank Welker and Dee Bradley Baker in all forms of media) is a chameleon who was washed away one rainy night until he found himself adopted by a young Rapunzel. Considered Rapunzel's best friend, Pascal is ever loyal to her and despite his small appearance, hides boundless energy that always comes in handy when protecting his friend.

=== Maximus ===
Maximus (voiced by Frank Welker and Dee Bradley Baker in all forms of media) is a horse for the royal guard. For years, he has been dead set on bringing in Flynn Rider to face his crimes. However, due to Rapunzel's influence and Flynn's eventual reformation, Maximus has become one of their closest allies. A strong, sturdy and reliable horse, Maximus is more of a soldier than the actual soldiers in Corona.

=== Mother Gothel ===
Mother Gothel (voiced by Donna Murphy in all forms of media) is the main antagonist of Tangled. Her actual age is around 400 years old, and due to this Gothel became obsessed with regaining her youth. She was ultimately forced to kidnap Rapunzel and raise her as her own at the cost of abandoning her birth daughter, Cassandra. Gothel mostly cares for her own vanity and while she brings out her maternal instincts, underneath it all she is a cruel and sinister woman who will not stop at anything to get what she wants.

=== The Stabbington Brothers ===
The Stabbington Brothers
- First appearance: Tangled (2010)
- Last appearance: Rapunzel's Tangled Adventure "Plus Est En Vous" (2020)
- Voiced by: Ron Perlman (Sideburns)

In-universe information
- Gender: Male (both)
- Full name: Sideburns and Patchy Stabbington

Sideburns and Patchy Stabbington are unrelenting twin criminals. They are recognized by their tall intimidating appearances, scarred features and orange hair. As their names imply, one has noticeable sideburns and wears a green tunic and leather arm bands while one has an eye patch and black leather tunic with long sleeves. While both are credited, only Sideburns actually speaks while Patchy is silent. They first appear in Tangled; having teamed up with Flynn Rider (Eugene Fitzherbert) to steal the royal tiara from Corona. Eugene betrays the two and they are captured by the royal guards. They manage to escape and plot revenge, only to run into Mother Gothel who hires the two of them to not only get back at Eugene, but also to get Rapunzel. She of course betrays the two and they are captured once again. They briefly appear in Tangled Forever After where they have apparently reformed, though still imprisoned, and are in attendance of Eugene and Rapunzel's wedding, bawling during the reception.

The Stabbington Brothers appear in Tangled: The Series, which chronologically takes before Tangled Forever After. They once again try to get their revenge on Eugene, this time with Cassandra also caught in the middle, but are defeated and reimprisoned. They next appear on a prison ship alongside other criminals that Rapunzel and Eugene have faced in the past. Together, they try to kill Eugene and Maximus after they accidentally end up on their ship, but Rapunzel and her allies arrive and defeat them. Due to their constant defeats, the Stabbington Brothers start to be viewed as jokes by the criminal community and once again plot to kill Eugene. This time, they kidnap Eugene's father, King Edmund, but are once again defeated, but then rescued by Eugene. The two are surprised that Eugene would do such a thing despite their animosity towards him, implying that this act is what causes them to reform. In "No Time Like the Past", the Stabbington Brothers are revealed to have known Eugene and Lance Strongbow since they were teenagers and it is implied that they were the ones to induct them into a life of thievery. The events of the past are slightly muddled for them however as Rapunzel and Pascal had traveled back in time due to a magical hourglass that also allowed them to take over their bodies. Due to their influence, the Stabbingtons indirectly teach Eugene to be much more selfless.

=== Captain of the Guards ===
Captain of the Guards
- First appearance: Tangled (2010)
- Last appearance: Rapunzel's Tangled Adventure "Plus Est En Vous" (2020)
- Voiced by: M. C. Gainey

In-universe information
- Gender: Male
- Family: Cassandra (adopted daughter)
- Pet: Maximus (horse)

The Captain of the Guards is the unnamed head of the Coronan guards. He is a tall, well-built man usually adorned in gold armor and helmet and sporting a mustache. He is loyal to the Kingdom of Corona and is well disciplined. In Tangled, he has almost made it his whole career to chase down Flynn Rider who'd become a notorious thief in the area. He manages to finally capture Flynn, now going by his real name Eugene, and was ready to send him to the gallows, but is thwarted by the Pub Thugs who knock him out and rescue Eugene. He is not seen again for the rest of the film.

The Captain gets more development in Tangled: The Series, where he is revealed to have an adopted daughter named Cassandra, a handmaiden who wishes to be a guard. Despite her being heavily qualified for the position, something which he identifies, the Captain is overly concerned for her and wants to protect her. However, he still is at odds with Eugene due to their past relationship and was heavily against him becoming a member of the guards. Over time, he does become more accepting of him. In the season one finale "Secret of the Sun Drop", the Captain discovers that Cassandra was indirectly responsible for Rapunzel's current condition. He does not speak out against King Frederic's decision to have her sent to a convent; something he deeply regrets and causes a rift between the two. They make up when Varian attacks Corona and he finally sees her as a capable woman and potential soldier.

The Captain does not return until season three. In "Rapunzel's Return", a flashback reveals that he and his guards where close to capturing Mother Gothel after she had kidnapped Rapunzel, but lost her. He instead finds Cassandra (who is revealed to be Gothel's biological daughter) and adopts her as his own after she was abandoned by her mother; unlike Gothel, who did not love Cassandra, the Captain did truly love her. In the present, he sent out a search party to look for Rapunzel after the Separatists of Saporia take over the kingdom. By the time Rapunzel, Eugene, and their friends return, he is still gone. Following an encounter with Cassandra and learning of her turn to evil, he is revealed to have ended up on Terapi Islands, the home of the Lorbs. He uses one of the Lorb artifacts to bring to life a four-year-old version of Cassandra to raise without all of his current regrets. Rapunzel and her friends arrive and learn that the longer the wish stays, the worse it becomes. The Captain, after seeing that the young Cassandra had no shadow and realizing that she isn't real, ultimately chooses to move on and destroys his wish; returning to Corona to resume his place. Following a nightmare about confronting Cassandra, the Captain steps down from his position and hands his title over to Eugene, having fully accepted him as a hero. After Cassandra is redeemed, the Captain reunites and makes amends with her while seeing her off to venture the world. It is heavily implied that Cassandra had accepted him as her true parent.

=== King Frederic ===
King Frederic
- First appearance: Tangled (2010)
- Last appearance: Rapunzel's Tangled Adventure "Plus Est En Vous" (2020)
- Voiced by: Clancy Brown

In-universe information
- Gender: Male
- Family: Queen Ariana (wife); Rapunzel (daughter); Eugene Fitzherbert (son-in-law); Willow (sister-in-law)

King Frederic is the father of Rapunzel and the King of Corona. When his wife became sick late into her pregnancy, he ordered his guards to look for "a miracle" to save his wife. They found the sundrop flower and his wife was cured in time to give birth to a daughter. One night, the infant was stolen by Mother Gothel and King Frederic sent out his guards, but were unsuccessful. For the next eighteen years, Frederic and Arianna held a festival in honor of their missing daughter, by launching lanterns into the sky, in the hopes that she will one day see them. Frederic and Arianna were shocked when Eugene Fitzherbert, formally criminal Flynn Rider, showed up one day to present their daughter, Rapunzel, now fully grown and hugged them. Frederic returns in Tangled Ever After where he got to walk his daughter down the aisle of her wedding. Frederic was completely silent in the film and the short.

Frederic returns in Tangled: Before Ever After and its follow up Tangled: The Series which takes place six months after the film, but before the short film. Frederic is glad to have Rapunzel back, but is over protective of her and has a wall erected around the kingdom. Frederic becomes the target of notorious pirate Lady Caine. He is rescued by Rapunzel who managed to cross the wall with Cassandra and regained her long, glowing hair. While thankful for being saved, Frederic solemnly passes a new law preventing Rapunzel from leaving without his consent. Following this, the two refuse to speak with one another. He finally does speak to his daughter, showing her that despite his severe protection of her, he still loves her. He resorts to lying to his daughter about the black rocks in the hopes of deterring her from reassembling the graphtic scroll used to explain the sundrop and moonstone. Frederic begins to regret his actions against his daughter when she compares him to Mother Gothel, made worse by the fact that he still has the sundrop flower. When Arianna is kidnapped by a vengeful Varian, Frederic finally comes to terms with his actions and teams up with Rapunzel while Eugene, Cassandra, Lance and the people of Corona fight against Varian's automatons. He finally accepts Rapunzel's independence and allows her to leave the kingdom to follow the black rocks.

Frederic and Arianna are completely absent from the second season, title Rapunzel's Tangled Adventure, but make quick appearances in "Happiness Is..." and "Rapunzeltopia", both as part of hallucinations that preyed on Rapunzel's hopes and desires.

When Rapunzel, Eugene and their friends return to Corona, they are shocked to find that in their absence, Frederic and Arianna were hit with amnesia by an escaped Varian who had teamed up with Andrew and the Separatists of Saporia in an effort to overthrow the kingdom. They act completely aloof and do not seem to realize that they are in danger. In "The King and Queen of Hearts", Frederic and Arianna try to remember their relationship with one another as they have also forgotten what made them fall in love to begin with. Frederic is shown to be something of a bore as the only thing he seems interested in is collecting eggs. Rapunzel finally forces the two on a date and upon seeing their daughter's qualities in each other slowly begin to fall back in love. This is almost ruined by King Trevor, who had pined for Arianna's affection in their youth. After another high stakes adventure, Frederic and Arianna begin to remember their life together more. By the episode "Islands Apart", Frederic is shown to have regained practically all of his memories. Eventually, he joins the final battle to defend Corona and fight Zhan Tiri while also witnessing Cassandra's reformation.

=== Queen Arianna ===
Queen Arianna
- First appearance: Tangled (2010)
- Last appearance: Rapunzel's Tangled Adventure "Plus Est En Vous" (2020)
- Voiced by: Kari Wahlgren; Julie Bowen

In-universe information
- Gender: Female
- Family: King Frederic (husband); Rapunzel (daughter); Eugene Fitzherbert (son-in-law); Willow (younger sister)

Queen Arianna is the mother of Rapunzel and the Queen of Corona. Arianna was expecting a daughter, but became incredibly sick and was facing possible death. She was saved by her royal guards when they found the sundrop flower and turned it into a soup for her to drink. She recovered and gave birth to a baby girl named Rapunzel. She was devastated when her daughter was kidnapped in the night by Mother Gothel and further hurt when they could not find her. For the next eighteen years, Frederic and Arianna held a festival in honor of their missing daughter, by launching lanterns into the sky, in the hopes that she will one day see them. Frederic and Arianna were shocked when Eugene Fitzherbert, formally criminal Flynn Rider, showed up one day to present their daughter, Rapunzel, now fully grown and hugged them. Arianna was completely silent in the film. Arianna returns in Tangled Ever After, attending her daughter's wedding. She speaks, albeit in Max and Pascal's fantasy, where she reveals that the rings belonged to her grandmother.

Arianna returns in Tangled: Before Ever After and its follow up Tangled: The Series which takes place six months after the film, but before the short film. She mostly takes a supporting role in various episodes. She does provide Rapunzel with a journal with a written phrase in it stating "Plus Est En Vous", meaning "More is in You"; giving her the motivation needed to feel empowered. It is revealed that Arianna has a younger sister named Wilhelmina "Willow" who is more adventurous than her. As a matter of fact, much of her sister's personality is more akin to Rapunzel than to her. Furthermore, she had a somewhat crippling eagerness to impress those around her, which would result in her taking any dare that Willow threw her way. Her sister's appearance conflicts with her and Rapunzel's plan for her birthday. Ultimately, the siblings make up with one another.

Arianna and Frederic are completely absent from the second season, title Rapunzel's Tangled Adventure, but make quick appearances in "Happiness Is..." and "Rapunzeltopia", both as part of hallucinations that preyed on Rapunzel's hopes and desires.

When Rapunzel, Eugene and their friends return to Corona, they are shocked to find that in their absence, Arianna and Frederic were hit with amnesia by an escaped Varian who had teamed up with Andrew and the Separatists of Saporia in an effort to overthrow the kingdom. They act completely aloof and do not seem to realize that they are in danger. In "The King and Queen of Hearts", Arianna and Frederic try to remember their relationship with one another as they have also forgotten what made them fall in love to begin with. Arianna is shown to be very adventurous and enjoys things like horseback riding. Rapunzel finally forces the two on a date and upon seeing their daughter's qualities in each other slowly begin to fall back in love. This is almost ruined by King Trevor, who had pined for Arianna's affection in their youth. After another high stakes adventure, Arianna and Frederic begin to remember their life together more. By the episode "Islands Apart", Frederic implies that Arianna has regained all of her memories. Eventually, she joins the final battle to defend Corona and fight Zhan Tiri while also witnessing Cassandra's reformation.

=== Pub Thugs ===
- Hook Hand (voiced by Brad Garrett) is a big, bald man with a hook for a hand. He wishes to be a concert pianist despite his missing limb. He succeeds and begins to go on tour, making him completely absent from the series. He eventually returns in "The Brothers Hook" where he hypocritically looks down on his brother Hook Foot's dream of being a dancer. With Rapunzel's help, they ultimately make up and Hook Hand asks his brother to tour with him, to which he accepts. He is also the only pub thug that still dislikes Eugene.
- Big Nose (voiced by Jeffrey Tambor) is a goofy-looking thug with, as his name implies, a big nose. He sings that he has extra toes, a goiter, and apparently a really bad complexion. He wishes to have someone to love, as he is apparently a romantic type. At the end of the movie, he meets a young lady. In the series, Eugene reveals that the woman's name is Assunta. He joins Eugene, Cassandra, Lance, and the people of Corona to fight against Varian's automatons. Eventually, he joins the final battle to defend Corona and fight Zhan Tiri.
- Vladimir (voiced by Richard Kiel in the film and Charles Halford in the series) is a giant intimidating man with a helmet adorned in large horns. Despite his large appearance, he would rather collect tiny ceramic unicorns, which he is passionate about. This was Richard Kiel's final role before his death. He helps Eugene, Cassandra, Lance and the people of Corona fight against Varian's automatons. Eventually, he joins the final battle to defend Corona and fight Zhan Tiri.
- Attila Buckethead (voiced by Nathan Greno in the film and Steve Blum in the series) is a thug who wears a metal helmet that covers his face. He actually loves to bake and is a natural at it. The reason for his helmet is that he is "repugnant" underneath, but also really shy. He was kicked out of the kingdom after being accused of blowing up Monty's candy store, but thanks to Rapunzel was proven innocent. while Eugene, Cassandra, Lance and the people of Corona fight against Varian's automatons. Eventually, he joins the final battle to defend Corona and fight Zhan Tiri.
- Shorty (voiced by Paul F. Tompkins) is a short, white-bearded thug who always seems to be in a state of inebriation. He is very friendly, but is aloof and constantly slurs and has a habit of getting people's names wrong. He is shown to be surprisingly observant and sometimes ends up coming in handy. He disguised himself as Rapunzel to fool Varian but the disguise failed. He joins Rapunzel's entourage, albeit accidentally, when they traveled to the dark kingdom. Eventually, he joins the final battle to defend Corona and fight Zhan Tiri.
- Ulf is a thug who wants to be a mime. He communicates entirely through miming actions and only Shorty seems to be capable of translating it. He helps Eugene, Cassandra, Lance and the people of Corona fight against Varian's automatons. Eventually, he joins the final battle to defend Corona and fight Zhan Tiri.
- Tor is a thug working at the Snuggly Duckling who wants to be a florist.
- Gunther is a thug who wants to do interior designs.
- Bruiser is a thug who knits.
- Killer is a thug who sews.
- Fang is a thug who does puppet shows.

== Television introductions ==
=== Cassandra ===
Cassandra
- First appearance: Tangled: Before Ever After (2017)
- Last appearance: Rapunzel's Tangled Adventure "Plus Est En Vous" (2020)
- Voiced by: Eden Espinosa

In-universe information
- Alias: Cass
- Gender: Female
- Family: Mother Gothel (mother); Captain of the Guards (adoptive father); Rapunzel (adoptive sister); Owl; Fidella (horse)

Cassandra is a major character in Tangled: Before Ever After and Tangled: The Series, later retitled Rapunzel's Tangled Adventure. She was created by Chris Sonnenburg when he was trying to answer the question "What is it that Rapunzel NEEDS in her life?" He began to look at his daughters and the way they interacted with each other and their friends. That, combined with an old concept drawing of Queen Arianna from an early version of the movie where she was a "Joan of Arc" type, led to the creation of Cassandra. Early concept art had the character presented as a slightly younger archer Robin Hood type.

As a contrast from Rapunzel and Eugene, Cassandra, or Cass for short, is a no-nonsense, tough individual that had a very disciplined upbringing. Her first meeting with Rapunzel is established in "Beginnings" where she had the chance to join the royal guard for the Queen of Ingvarr, but upon realizing how much she cared about Rapunzel, chose to give up her opportunity to serve her. She first appears in Tangled: Before Ever After as Rapunzel's lady-in-waiting. On the side, she is a knight in training for her adopted father, the Captain of the Guards. Seeing how Rapunzel felt miserable not being allowed to leave Corona, Cassandra steps up and takes her out beyond the walls to the spot where the sundrop flower once stood; now coated in black rocks. The rocks bring Rapunzel's long, glowing hair back with Cassandra concerned for her job. She forces Rapunzel not to tell Eugene about it, though he finds out anyway, and later coerces her to not explain how it came back as she does not trust Eugene and also so that she can keep her job, though once again he finds out.

Cassandra spends much of season one trying to prove her worth to her father by partaking in various challenges. During this time, her relationship with Rapunzel is explored as Cass feels that she cannot take care of herself. However, the two end up developing a close bond with one another. She also has a habit of getting into petty arguments with Eugene, whom she is not afraid to talk down to and insult. Despite this, the two of them do care about one another. She also befriends the young alchemist Varian who is implied to have a crush on her. However, these feelings are never reciprocated most likely due to their age. Frederic eventually discovers Cassandra's part in Rapunzel's hair returning and she is forced to be sent to a convent; upsetting her as her father fails to defend her actions. He does eventually come around and Cass once again helps Rapunzel and Eugene save the kingdom from a vengeful Varian.

Cassandra joins Rapunzel and her allies in following the black rocks to the Dark Kingdom. They also encounter Adira who follows them, but leaves Cass highly suspicious of her. During the journey, Cass begins to feel that she is doing nothing, but "waiting in the wings" for Rapunzel, especially when she begins to scold her friend for not trusting her decisions. A fight with a warrior named Hector forces Rapunzel to enact the reverse incantation which slowly kills everything around them. When Cass tries to stop Rapunzel, her arm gets completely scorched by the spell. Afterward, Cass dons a suit of leftover armor and takes a more hardened facade. After being forced to stay at a strange inn due to a severe storm, Cass and the group find themselves facing strange supernatural threats. Cass is lead away by the group and enters a strange room. After defeating the owner of the inn, Tromus, the inn disappears and Cass exits in one piece, but disoriented. Upon finally reaching the Dark Kingdom and being allowed entrance to the Moonstone, Cass suddenly takes it from Rapunzel to fulfill "her" destiny. Taking on a dark sinister look with glowing blue hair, Cass turns on her friends.

In the season three premiere, it is revealed that Cassandra is the biological daughter of Mother Gothel (which would technically make Rapunzel her stepsister), having presumably been unintended. Cass openly showed love and devotion to her despite clearly not getting any love in return. On the night that Rapunzel was kidnapped by Gothel, she is abandoned, but then found by the Captain, who promises to look after her. While Gothel pretended to love Cassandra but really considered her a "lousy pest", the Captain did love her for real. In the present, she escapes Rapunzel in the hopes of finding her own destiny. She is accompanied by the spirit of a little girl who has sinister plans for her. Cass encounters the Captain and criticizes him for lying to her this whole time. She soon crashes Eugene's birthday party and demands the scroll. A reformed Varian destroys his translation key, but he is abducted after he reveals that he memorized it. Despite his pleas about becoming a villain, Cass refuses to listen so she ultimately traps him inside a cage then she sends the caged Varian outside on a precipice at the top of the tower to hang helplessly when she fights Rapunzel. Their combined powers causes the Enchanted Girl to regain her physical form. Afterwards, Cass and the Enchanted Girl break into the Spire and steal the Mind Trap to take control of the members of the Brotherhood from the Dark Kingdom. Cass reencounters Rapunzel after they hear of Mother Gothel's ghost haunting the old house. While it seems that the two of them will make up, Cass is convinced that Mother Gothel truly loved her and once again abandons Rapunzel. She later learns the truth and discovers that the Enchanted Girl is the evil demon sorceress Zhan Tiri. Disguising herself as Rapunzel's new handmaiden that is named Faith, Cass attempts to make amends with Rapunzel. However, upon being outed and realizing how everyone sees her, Cass turns on all of Corona and takes over the kingdom, forcing everyone out. Cass and Rapunzel face off again with Zhan Tiri taking advantage and removing both of their powers. Realizing where they have gone, Cass and Rapunzel finally make up with Cass using a small piece of the Moonstone to empower Rapunzel long enough for them to defeat Zhan Tiri once and for all. Cass finally makes amends with everyone, including her adopted father (whom she apparently accepts as her true parent), and bids Rapunzel farewell, now traveling the world to look for a new destiny.

=== Varian ===
Varian
- First appearance: Tangled: The Series "What the Hair?!" (2017)
- Last appearance: Rapunzel's Tangled Adventure "Plus Est En Vous" (2020)
- Voiced by: Jeremy Jordan

In-universe information
- Gender: Male
- Family: Quirin (father); Ulla (not canon mother)
- Pet: Ruddiger (racoon)

Varian is a young 14-year-old alchemist who lives in Old Corona with his father Quirin. He is enlisted by Cassandra to study Rapunzel's hair after it mysteriously grew back from the black rocks. They ultimately have to put their experimentation to the side when a machine he had been working on, that would have created a heated water system, begins to overheat and threatens to blow up. While nobody is harmed, his father is disappointed in him not taking precaution. Later, he enters a science expo to show off his invention to the famous Doctor St. Croix. He is revealed to have something of a crush on Cassandra and relies on her to help him out. After a series of conflicting events, Varian is tasked by Rapunzel to study the black rocks that have been found all around Corona. In "Queen for a Day", Varian discovers that Quirin has been lying to King Frederic about the rocks, he decides to create a concoction to combat the rocks. Unfortunately, the concoction creates a quickly encompassing amber that gets on Quirin. Varian rushes to the castle to ask Rapunzel for help, but a wintery storm has just hit the kingdom but Nigel wants Pete and Stan to remove Varian from inside the castle. Returning home to find his father encased inside the amber and feeling that Rapunzel has betrayed him, Varian selfishly swears revenge on her and everyone. Months later, when he learns that Corona still has the flower, he recruits Rapunzel to steal it. He reveals his true plot to steal the flower. However, the flower fails to free Quirin from the amber and he realizes that the magic is solely inside Rapunzel now. Driving a giant robot, Varian attempts to force Rapunzel to use her unbreakable magic hair to shatter the amber and free his father by abducting Queen Arianna. The magic fails to work and Varian ends up attacking Rapunzel and trying to murder both Queen Arianna and Cassandra. Rapunzel eventually defeats Varian but he is arrested and when he is sent to prison, he still wants to make his dad proud of him.

Varian is completely absent throughout the second season. However, he does make a brief cameo appearance in "Happiness Is..." as a hallucination brought upon Rapunzel when she holds the Idol of Vershaftsbezeigungengien. He is also mentioned by Adira as the son of Quirin in "Rapunzel and the Great Tree".

He returns in the season three premiere "Rapunzel's Return" where he has teamed up with Andrew and the Separatists of Saporia to overthrow the kingdom. Using the Saporian Wand of Oblivium, they wiped the memories of King Frederic and Queen Arianna and fight Rapunzel and her friends. However, Varian reveals that he hoped to use the wand's abilities to create a gas called Quirineon, after his father, and use it on all of Corona so that they can forget his past misdeeds. He teams back up with Rapunzel and defeat the Separatists. Rapunzel recited the decay incantation to free Quirin from the amber and succeeds and then Rapunzel and Varian reconcile their friendship . Since then, Varian has tried to restore the memories of Rapunzel's parents. This has proven difficult as the citizens of Corona still do not trust him because of his misdeeds. Following a bout of red rocks that induce fear in everyone, Varian uses his amber solution to encase the single black rock at the Demanitus Chamber and is hailed a hero. Varian starts to translate the Graphtic Scroll to learn more about the Sundrop and Moonstone. He memorizes it, but then destroys the translation key that Cassandra needs. Cassandra takes Varian, who is forced to tell her the incantation. He tries to talk sense into her by empathizing with her because he was on the same path of darkness and hatred that she is currently on. After Zhan Tiri entered Varian's dream, Varian learns the hidden incantation. He quickly gets to work, creating a defense system against Cassandra, despite still empathizing with her while he and Eugene worked on Project Obsidian to encase Cassandra if she harms him, Eugene, Rapunzel and the people of Corona. Eventually, Varian joins the final battle to defend Corona and fight Zhan Tiri. He builds the machine Demantus used to trap Zhan Tiri Years ago but ends up trapping himself and the others in the lost realm except Eugene and King Edmund. He ends up getting out thanks to his father, Quirin. He also witnessed Cassandra's reformation. In the epilogue, Varian is given the title of the royal engineer and finally creates a water heating system, which he has wanted to do since the first episode, making Corona the first of seven kingdoms to have it.

=== Lance Strongbow ===
Lance Strongbow
- First appearance: Tangled: The Series "The Return of Strongbow" (2017)
- Last appearance: Rapunzel's Tangled Adventure "Plus Est En Vous" (2020)
- Voiced by: James Monroe Iglehart

In-universe information
- Alias: Arnwaldo Schnitz
- Gender: Male
- Family: Angry (adopted daughter); Red (adopted daughter)

Arnwaldo Schnitz, better known as Lance Strongbow, is Eugene’s childhood best friend and former partner-in-crime. Initially based on Star Wars character Lando Calrissian, Lance is a charming, good-natured thief who can occasionally be boastful and over dramatic. In "No Time Like the Past", Lance is established as having become a thief, presumably through the Stabbington Brothers. He first appears in "The Return of Strongbow" where he is reunited with Eugene and convinces him to join him in stealing treasure from an old enemy of theirs, the Baron, by claiming that it was bestowed upon him. This turns out to be a lie and later Lance tries to help Eugene with returning a ring that belonged to Queen Arianna that they had stolen a long time ago. In the end, everything is resolved and Lance ends up donating money to the local Corona orphanage, though he keeps some for himself. Since then, Lance begins making recurring appearances, mostly as a comedic foil. He gets some attention in "Big Brothers of Corona" when Lance tries to help him get a job at the castle as a guard. To prove themselves, they are tasked with looking after two little girls whom they call Angry and Red. While they are unable to change their thieving ways, they do get them to return some of the treasure that they stole and Lance decides to instead be the chef at the Snuggly Duckling. In the season one finale, he concocts a plan to free Rapunzel from her room and then aids in battling a vengeful Varian.

In season two, titled Rapunzel's Tangled Adventure, Lance joins Rapunzel, Eugene, Cassandra, Hook Foot and Shorty on their journey to the Dark Kingdom. They run into the Baron who poisons Lance so that Eugene can marry his daughter Stalyan. He is saved and falls in love with the mysterious warrior Adira, but his feelings are never reciprocated. In "Rapunzel and the Great Tree", Eugene tells Lance that he is a dishonest and vain individual which would make it impossible for Adira to like someone like him. They end up getting drugged by man eating plants while singing the song "Buddy" and make up with one another. He joins his friends in entering the Dark Kingdom and fights off the ghosts of Eugene's ancestors.

Lance returns with his friends to Corona, sans Cassandra, and helps out in fighting off the Separatists of Saporia and reforming Varian. Lance spends the majority of the third and final season filling out a supporting role and adding lighthearted humor to the more serious and darker story. In "Be Very Afraid", he is revealed to suffer from a very specific fear of clown-spiders. He manages to summon the courage to sing "Bigger Than That", allowing everyone to overcome their fears and defeat the red rocks that were inducing them. He comedically gets in the way of a Varian's newest invention of a defense system for Corona against Cassandra. Lance is also present in the final battle against Zhan Tiri. After defeating her and all is restored, while also witnessing Cassandra's reformation. In the epilogue, Lance decides to adopt Angry and Red.

=== Kiera and Catalina Schnitz ===
Kiera and Catalina Schnitz
- First appearance: Tangled: The Series "Big Brothers of Corona" (2017)
- Last appearance: Rapunzel's Tangled Adventure "Plus Est En Vous" (2020)
- Voiced by: Vivian Vencer (Angry); Ruby Jay (Red)

In-universe information
- Aliases: Kiera Schnitz; Catalina Schnitz
- Gender: Female (both)
- Family: Lance Strongbow (adopted father)

Kiera and Catalina Schnitz are two girls and sisters who are recurring characters. They first appear in "Big Brothers of Corona" where the two begin thieving all over the kingdom, but are soon caught. They initially refused to speak, forcing Eugene and Lance to call the duo "Angry", because of her curt demeanor, and "Red", because of her orange-red hair and nicer personality. The two are taken to Rapunzel and soon they begin to open up. Even though they steal for a living, they do not want to. It is soon revealed that they were to steal a tiara for the Baron, but chose to run away. They are captured by Anthony the Weasel, who works for the Baron, but Eugene and Lance arrive and rescue them, with Kiera and Catalina rescuing them back in return. They give up all of their stolen items and leave Corona.

They do not return until the season two episode "Vigor the Visionary" where they kidnap the titular Vigor, a monkey, because he might know where their parents are based on his premonition "Follow the leaf to find your tree". They discover a couple named Petunia and William who welcome them with open arms. However, it turns out that the couple are actually the daylight thieves and they plan on disposing Rapunzel, Eugene, Angry and Red so as not to give up their hideout. They manage to defeat them and Angry and Red realize that the premonition meant that the two of them are family and embrace. They return Vigor to his owner, Madame Canardist, and leave Rapunzel and Eugene to pay for her "services". Angry and Red are mentioned by Rapunzel in "Curses"

In season three, Kiera and Catalina, now visibly older, decide to move into Corona permanently. Their real names are finally revealed to be Kiera and Catalina, respectively with the latter being referred to for the remainder of the series. Catalina is revealed to not want to move out of their tree house and was upset over the fact that no one considered her the angry one because of all of her penned up emotions. She is inflicted with the werewolf curse, but with Kiera now more aware of her sister's feelings, gets her to control her new power. They make a compromise by making their tree house home cozier and covered in Rapunzel's paintings. They begin to make recurring appearances throughout the last season and even go on a trip to Neserdnia with Rapunzel, Varian, Pascal, Ruddiger, Hamuel and Maximus to return Kiera and Catalina's loot that they took from people during their thieving days. They join Rapunzel, Eugene, Lance, Pascal and Maximus in confronting Cassandra when she abducted Varian. They take part in the final battle against Zhan Tiri, with Catalina assuming her werewolf form in the battle. After defeating her and all is restored, while also witnessing Cassandra's reformation. In the epilogue, Kiera and Catalina are adopted by Lance, who moves in with them. This makes them happy even after realizing their new legal last name is Schnitz.

=== King Edmund ===
King Edmund
- First appearance: Rapunzel's Tangled Adventure "Beyond the Corona Walls" (2018)
- Last appearance: Rapunzel's Tangled Adventure "Plus Est En Vous" (2020)
- Voiced by: Bruce Campbell

In-universe information
- Gender: Male
- Family: Eugene Fitzherbert (son); Unnamed wife Rapunzel (daughter-in-law)
- Pet: Hamuel (raven); Domino (horse)

King Edmund is the king of the forgotten Dark Kingdom and the long lost father of Eugene Fitzherbert. In flashback, Edmund ruled the Dark Kingdom with the help of the opal, later revealed to be the Moonstone. However, with the appearance of the black rocks, Edmund tried to destroy the Moonstone to no avail and causing his right arm. With no other options, he sent his finest warriors Quirin and Adira to flee the kingdom with his people. After his wife perished, he took his infant son, christened Horace, but later would grow up as Eugene Fitzherbert and eventually Flynn Rider, and had a servant take him far away and placed in an orphanage. Years later, he attacked Rapunzel and her troupe in an effort to prevent them from entering the kingdom. He was alone with Eugene when he realized that he was his son after looking into his eyes. Edmund welcomed a very confused Eugene and told him of his history. He managed to convince him to prevent Rapunzel from entering as there was no knowing what would happen if her Sundrop power combined with the Moonstone. Edmund eventually got over his own fear, thanks to Eugene, and put his faith in Rapunzel by fighting against the ghosts of his ancestors. Unfortunately, Cassandra became the thing he feared when she took the Moonstone for herself.

After Rapunzel, Eugene and their friends return to Corona, Edmund arrives for a visit where he displays a very eccentric personality. He leaves a sacred sash for Eugene, but it gets stolen and the two of them set off to search for it. It is revealed that Edmund faked the theft so that they can bond. At first Eugene is upset, but learns that Edmund had been keeping tabs on him by collecting some of his toys and his wanted poster. Together, father and son team up to defeat the Stabbington Brothers once and for all. He is present at Eugene's birthday party and reveals that he has been away from him for twenty six years. Edmund takes part in defending Corona against Zhan Tiri. He is forced to face off against his former warriors Adira, Hector and Quirin with Eugene by his side. However, Edmund is always shown to be affected by the Mind Trap and fights his son. He overcomes his control when Eugene speaks to him and finally accepts him as his father. After defeating her and all is restored, while also witnessing Cassandra's reformation. In the epilogue, Edmund, Adira and Hector return to the Dark Kingdom to rebuild it and it is implied that he maintains contact with Eugene and Rapunzel.

=== Zhan Tiri ===
Zhan Tiri
- First appearance: Tangled: The Series "Queen for a Day" (2017)
- Last appearance: Rapunzel's Tangled Adventure "Plus Est En Vous" (2020)
- Voiced by: Jennifer Veal (Enchanted Girl); Tara Fitzgerald

In-universe information
- Alias: Enchanted Girl
- Gender: Female

Zhan Tiri is the primary antagonist of Tangled: The Series, later retitled Rapunzel's Tangled Adventure. She is an evil and fierce demonic sorceress who wants to control the power of the Sundrop and the Moonstone. She first "appears" as a snowstorm that covers Corona. The local blacksmith Xavier first mentions Zhan Tiri as a warlock that could summon storms, though it is later revealed that she could take many forms including a warlock and a storm. Zhan Tiri is mentioned throughout all of season one and two, though she only makes a semi-appearance in one episode. Her disciple, Sugracha the Eternal, attempted to fulfill her master's bidding by releasing her, but was defeated. At some point, Zhan Tiri took over the Great Tree, turning it into a fortress, but the dark magic was sealed off by Lord Demanitus. The second of Zhan Tiri's disciples, Tromus, tries to drain Rapunzel's Sundrop powers into an idol of Zhan Tiri by trapping her in a dream world. He is defeated and banished as well. Lord Demanitus, taking on the form of Vigor, explains how his former disciples turned on him to summon Zhan Tiri. It is revealed that Zhan Tiri's third disciple was indeed Mother Gothel.

Zhan Tiri, taking on the form of the Enchanted Girl, appears to Cassandra and reveals her history with Gothel and her adopting Rapunzel as her own. Convincing her that Rapunzel stole her destiny, Zhan Tiri successfully recruits Cass as her new disciple once she acquires the Moonstone. She pushes her to embrace her angry emotions, as they make her stronger, and further convinces her that Rapunzel will always best her due to her emotions. Zhan Tiri has Cass retrieve the Graphtic Scroll to learn the true power of the Sundrop and Moonstone. When Varian destroys the Graphtic scroll's translation key, having memorized it, they abducted him. Zhan Tiri goes behind Cass' back by telling Varian how to unlock the powers. With Rapunzel and Cass using their full energy, Zhan Tiri is brought back in physical form, albeit still as a child. Zhan Tiri and Cass head back to the Spire and kidnap Calliope and force her to give them the Mind Trap to use against the Brotherhood. She confronts Rapunzel in private and reveals her identity as well as the fact that she is using Cass. Zhan Tiri resorts to tricky methods to further drive a wedge between Cass and Rapunzel. Afterwards, she reveals her identity to Cass, but tells them that it will not matter. Once again, she manipulates events so that Cass can further turn to evil. In a flashback, Zhan Tiri was revealed to once have been friends with Demanitus until she became corrupted by a desire to have the powers of the Sundrop and Moonstone all to herself and was banished to the Lost Realm. In the present, Zhan Tiri enacts her final step and acquires both powers; transforming into a full demon. With Rapunzel and Cassandra' friendship recovered, they team up and defeat Zhan Tiri by fusing the Sundrop and Moonstone together; obliterating her.

=== Corona civilians ===
- Hook Foot (voiced by Jeff Ross) is the younger brother of Hook Hand. He apparently replaces him when he sets off to tour the world as a concert pianist. He spends much of season one helping Rapunzel with various tasks. He helps Eugene, Cassandra, Lance and the people of Corona fight against Varian's automatons. He joins Rapunzel in venturing beyond Corona towards the Dark Kingdom. He even falls in love with a mermaid named Seraphina, whom he is forced to leave when it turns out she is a criminal on the run. He reveals that he dreamed of being a dancer when he reunites with his brother. Despite his brother looking down on his dream, he shows how important it is to him and they make up. He decides to leave the group and join his brother on his tour. In the series finale, he is reunited with Seraphina.
- Owl is an owl that Cassandra, somewhat passively, named Owl. He is loyal to Cassandra and acts as her "eyes in the sky". Even when Cassandra turned evil, Owl remained loyal, but was smart enough to understand that she was wrong about turning on Rapunzel.
- Fidella is Cassandra's, occasionally Rapunzel's, horse. She is briefly Varian's horse in the TV series episode "Once a Handmaiden...". She is Max's love interest.
- Ruddiger is Varian's friendly raccoon companion. When Varian became evil, Ruddiger was transformed into a giant monster, but reverted to normal. When Varian was arrested, he willingly stayed in prison with him. When Varian redeemed himself, Ruddiger joined the rest of the animals where he displayed a mischievous and cowardly personality. Eventually, he joins the final battle to defend Corona and fight Zhan Tiri while also witnessing Cassandra's reformation.
- Quirin (voiced by Jonathan Banks) is Varian's father and former member of the Brotherhood. He cares for his son, but is always embarrassed by his inventions. He gets frozen in a block of amber by one of Varian's chemicals. He is later saved by Rapunzel through the decay incantation and admits to Varian that he is proud of him. Cassandra takes over his mind through the Mind Trap, but is saved by Eugene and Edmund.
- Monty (voiced by Richard Kind) is the friendly owner of Corona's candy store. He likes everyone except Rapunzel due to her making changes to the kingdom which he is not used to. He mutually accepts the fact she does not like him in return after he urges her to accept his resentment towards her. Monty helps Eugene, Cassandra, Lance and the people of Corona fight against Varian's automatons. By season 3, he started to warm up to Rapunzel. Eventually, he joins the final battle to defend Corona and fight Zhan Tiri while also witnessing Cassandra's reformation.
- Hortense Q. "Old Lady" Crowley (voiced by Pat Carroll in seasons 1-2 and Susanne Blakeslee in season 3) is a grumpy old lady who works at the castle. Despite the abundance of strange occurrences in Corona, she maintains a grumpy face. The only thing that makes her happy is utter silence. She helps Eugene, Cassandra, Lance and the people of Corona fight against Varian's automatons. Eventually, she joins the final battle to defend Corona and fight Zhan Tiri while also witnessing Cassandra's reformation.
- Pete (voiced by Sean Hayes) and Stan (voiced byDiedrich Bader) are two recurring guards who despite being the Captain's "best men" are comical and slightly inept. They help Eugene, Cassandra, Lance and the people of Corona fight against Varian's automatons. Eventually, they join the final battle to defend Corona and fight Zhan Tiri while also witnessing Cassandra's reformation.
- Feldspar (voiced by Zachary Levi impersonating Ed Wynn) is the local shoemaker. He helps Eugene, Cassandra, Lance and the people of Corona fight against Varian's automatons. Eventually, he joins the final battle to defend Corona and fight Zhan Tiri while also witnessing Cassandra's reformation.
- Friedborg is a lady in waiting who has atypical features and is always silent. She is off putting, even for Rapunzel.
- Nigel (voiced by Peter MacNicol) is the royal adviser to King Frederic. He can be uptight, but is very loyal to Corona. He once had a pet dragon as a child, but it resulted in the destruction of his home town and since then, he has been against having dragons near Corona. He eventually lets up upon seeing Pascal's dragon return to its family.
- Xavier (voiced by Adewale Akinnuoye-Agbaje) is Corona's local blacksmith. He is well versed in ancient history and speaks with wisdom, but can sometimes ramble. He is based on a cancelled character from an earlier version of the movie. He helps Eugene, Cassandra, Lance and the people of Corona fight against Varian's automatons. Eventually, he joins the final battle to defend Corona and fight Zhan Tiri while also witnessing Cassandra's reformation.
- Ruthless Ruth (voiced by Danielle Brooks) is the original owner of the Snuggly Duckling. She was considered the meanest thug, but in actuality was a shy woman who wanted to write and sing music.
- Willow (voiced by Jane Krakowski) is Queen Arianna's younger sister and Rapunzel's aunt. She is something of a flower child and shares more in common with her niece than she does with her sister.
- Faith is a shy handmaid who works under Crowley. She is constantly pushed to her limits with her, she is briefly impersonated by Cassandra in an attempt to make amends with Rapunzel.

Jake "The Snake" Roberts has a cameo as Doyle the dart player in "The Eye of Pincosta" and "Return of the King" in the 2017 TV series.

=== Outside Corona ===
- Griffon of Pittsford (voiced by Jon Polito) is the short and insecure ruler of the neighboring kingdom to Corona.
- Adira (voiced by Kelly Hu) is a member of the Brotherhood with red paint on her left half of her face who has chosen to watch over Rapunzel and her allies. She had actually betrayed her fellow member Hector as she believed that Rapunzel will save Corona. Following Cassandra's betrayal, she leaves the group. Lance has a crush on her which she does not seem to reciprocate. Cassandra takes over her mind through the Mind Trap, but is saved by Eugene and Edmund, After helping Hector, King Edmund and the people of Corona defeat Zhan Tiri and all is restored, while also witnessing Cassandra's reformation. In the epilogue, Adira, Hector and King Edmund return to the Dark Kingdom to rebuild it.
- Vex (voiced by Britt Robertson) is a selfish and sneaky young girl who attempted to sell out Eugene to the Baron. She ends up helping Rapunzel. She takes the group to Vardaros where she, unwillingly, is forced to help the group overthrow Anthony the Weasel's reign over the town by finding Captain Quaid. Over time, she loosens up and becomes more optimistic, eventually becoming Quaid's deputy. Despite becoming friends with the group, she does not care much for Rapunzel's cheery nature.
- Captain Quaid "the Blade" (voiced by Reg E. Cathey) is the original protector of Vardaros who retired because the people lacked faith. He comes out of retirement and rouses everyone to take the city back. He assigns Vex as his deputy. This was Reg E. Cathey's final role before his death and his remaining dialogue had to be provided by Keith David.
- Vigor the Visionary (voiced by Dee Bradley Baker) is a monkey with supposedly psychic powers. It is heavily implied that while his psychic abilities are clearly fake, that he does possess some kind intuition. It is eventually revealed that he is a temporary vessel for Lord Demanitus so that he can aid Rapunzel and Eugene in defeating Zhan Tiri. Flashback shows that Vigor himself was once the animal companion for Demanitus. Vigor is based on a deleted character from the film whose scene would have taken place sometime after the pub scene.
- Madame Canardist (voiced by Carol Kane) is a fortune teller and Vigor's current owner. She is willing to help Rapunzel and her friends for a price. She can be a very vengeful woman, even if she is just a swindler. Madame Canardist is based on a deleted character from the film whose scene would have taken place sometime after the pub scene.
- Calliope (voiced by Natalie Palamides) is a former street magician who was taken in by the Keeper to apprentice at the Spire. When he left, she felt that she lost her purpose until Rapunzel and her friends arrived. She is obnoxious, self-indulgent and incredibly rude. She eventually drops her ruse when she puts the group in danger. Calliope eventually learns her lesson and becomes the new keeper. Rapunzel and Eugene encounter her again when Cass and Zhan Tiri hold her hostage.
- The Keeper (voiced by Tony Amendola) is the elderly keeper of the Spire who saw potential in Calliope.
- Lorbs are the German accented leaf-like natives of Tirapai Island. They are led by Alfons (voiced by Flula Borg) and include others such as Florina (voiced by Russi Taylor), Jorn and Borb (both voiced by Richard Steven Horvitz). They perceive Pascal as their king and have him defeat the fireflies so that their harvest can prosper. They created an object called the Idol of Vershaftsbezeigungengien which creates happy illusions, but turns the holder to avarice and decide to destroy it. Rapunzel and Eugene meet the Lorbs again when the Captain of the Guards decides to stay on the island. The Lorbs apparently cannot tell humans apart, but find mustaches to be very amusing.
- Seraphina (voiced by Katy Mixon) is a beautiful mermaid who falls for Hook Foot. She is revealed to be a criminal on the run and is forced to leave him to save him. In the series finale, she is reunited with Hook Foot.
- Lord Demanitus (voiced by Timothy Dalton) is an ancient engineer and inventor who once lived long ago in Corona. When the Sundrop and Moonstone fell to earth, Demanitus did all he could to study their power. However, his disciples (Sugracha, Tromus and Gothel) turned on him and summoned Zhan Tiri. Demanitus was actually once friends with Zhan Tiri, but he was forced to seal her away in the lost realm to prevent her from taking over the world.
- Hamuel is King Edmund's loyal, yet incredibly dumb, pet raven.
- Queen of Ingvarr (voiced by Gina Torres) is the ruler of a neighboring kingdom. She had taken an interest in Cassandra and offered her the chance to become part of her warrior guard. She ultimately turned her down when she decided to stay with Rapunzel.
- Little Big Guy is a dragon that Pascal befriends and raises. He can mimic the abilities of that who he is close too, while also share his abilities back. He is forced to leave so he can be with his kind.
- Brock Thunderstrike (voiced by Chris Diamantopoulos) is a thief that takes Eugene’s previous moniker as Flynn Rider. He turns out to be very dashing, but angers Eugene. He eventually learns that he should just use his real name and decides to become an adventurer instead. In the series finale, he hooks up with Stalyan.

=== Villains ===
- Lady Caine (voiced by Laura Benanti) is a pirate and the first major antagonist that Rapunzel and Eugene face in Tangled: Before Ever After. She wanted revenge on King Frederic for imprisoning her father for life when he was under suspicion of kidnapping Rapunzel as a baby. She was defeated and jailed with her crew. She tried to get her horse Axel to free her from prison, but this plan was stopped by Maximus. She later teamed up with the Stabbington Brothers and other criminals on a prison ship and tried to get revenge on Eugene and Maximus when they accidentally got on board, but were defeated again.
  - Lady Caine's Crew are Lady Caine's pirate crew.
    - Pocket (voiced by Jess Harnell) is the shifty second-in-command of Lady Caine's crew.
    - Otter (voiced by Kevin Michael Richardson) is a large intimidating member of Lady Caine's crew.
    - Bandanna is a member of Lady Caine's crew whose face is covered.
    - Skull Ruffian is a member of Lady Caine's with skull face paint.
    - Axel is Lady Caine's horse and Maximus' rival.
- Dwayne (voiced by Dee Bradley Baker) is a rather dumb and pathetic criminal who used to work for Lady Caine.
- Dale (voiced by Artt Butler) is a criminal who poses as an Italian artist named Giovanni while trying to steal a painting, but was stopped by Eugene. He attempted to get revenge on him with other criminals, but fails.
- Wreck Marauder (voiced by Danny Trejo) is a famously fierce warrior. Despite his reputation, Rapunzel and Cassandra are able to take him on. The series finale implies that he is related to Malice Marauder.
- Anthony the Weasel (voiced by Gideon Emery) is a loyal servant of the Baron who is ruthless and cruel. After the Baron is defeated, Anthony takes over Vardaros. He is defeated by Vex and Captain Quaid with the help of Rapunzel and her friends. At some point, he got arrested and was on a prison ship. He, along with other criminals, attempted to get revenge on Eugene and Maximus when they stowed away on their ship, but were once again defeated by Rapunzel.
- King Trevor (voiced by Bradley Whitford) is the childish ruler of Equis and King Fredrick’s longtime rival, who always pulls a yearly tradition of playing pranks on Corona. He hired Hook Hand to perform at his seal's wedding and challenged Hook Foot to a dance off. Trevor has long held unreciprocated feelings for Queen Arianna. He attempted to steal her away when he learned that she and Frederic were suffering from amnesia, but when their love prevailed, Trevor finally accepted that they were meant to be together.
  - Trevor Jr. is King Trevor's pet seal whom he adores. He marries a female seal named Lucille.
- Fernanda Pizazzo (voiced by Jessica St. Clair) is a phony inventor who dazzles the judges with flashiness as opposed to any actual beneficial machines. She is Varian's rival.
- Doctor Jean-Marc St. Croix (voiced by Barry Bostwick) is the ignorant scientist and judge who is easily swayed by Fernanda Pizazzo's useless machine.
- Separatists of Saporia are an organization dedicated to destroying Corona. Centuries ago, after a war between Corona and its rival kingdom Saporia ended in a romantic unity between its two leaders, some Saporians felt betrayed and swore revenge on Corona. They once again attempted to overthrow the kingdom with the help of Varian, but were once again defeated.
  - Andrew (voiced by Dean Winters) is a charming man who pretended to fall in love with Cassandra in order to steal King Herz Der Sonne’s journal, which contains Coronain secrets, but she was well aware of his intent and apprehended him. He also reveals his real name to be Hubert. He and his associates escape with the help of Varian and they give Frederic and Arianna amnesia, but was once again defeated when Varian sees the error of his ways.
  - Kai (voiced by Khary Payton) is a large bearded man with a small derby hat
  - Clementine (voiced by Betsy Sodaro), is a short hunchbacked witch in a green cloak
  - Juniper is a young black woman in an orange dress
  - Maisie is an older man in blue clothes and a top hat.
- Sugracha the Eternal (voiced by Ellen Greene) is one of Zhan Tiri's disciples. She came to Corona disguised as Mrs. Sugarby, the paint teacher. In actuality, she was hypnotizing Coronans so that they can use her magic paints to open a portal and release Zhan Tiri. She was defeated when Rapunzel tried to finish her painting but the painting was destroyed by Rapunzel resulting Sugracha to return to her spirit form and when she was knocked into the portal instead by Fidella. Sugracha was never seen again and her exact fate is left unknown, though it is assumed by fans that she may have been destroyed by Zhan Tiri as punishment for her failure.
- Stalyan (voiced by Yvonne Strahovski) is the daughter of the Baron and Eugene's former flame. She genuinely believes that she and Eugene belong together and tries to force him to marry her by poisoning Lance. This fails as Rapunzel rescues them and Stalyan is forced to carry her defeated father away. Later, she teams up with Rapunzel to pay off a debt to get Eugene out of jail. She attempts to betray Rapunzel, but she changes her mind; having finally accepted that Rapunzel and Eugene belong together. In the series finale, she hooks up with Eugene's look alike, Brock Thunderstrike, establishing that her feelings for Eugene were less to do with him as a person and more to with his good looks.
- The Baron (voiced by Lance Henriksen) is a legendary crime lord, who Eugene and Lance both used to work for. He is mentioned a couple of times throughout season one and has apparently held a grudge against Eugene and Lance for abandoning his team. He finally makes a physical appearance in season two where he attempts to force Eugene to marry his daughter Stalyan by poisoning Lance. In the end, Rapunzel, Pascal, Cassandra, Hook Foot and Maximus fight Stalyan, The Baron, Anthony the Weasel and The Baron's thugs to rescue Eugene, Lance and Shorty while Pascal cures Lance while the Baron is poisoned by his pet Kai spider due to Shorty's clumsiness. He reappears, having been disfigured by the poison and lost his criminal empire. His daughter also left him and he has sworn revenge on Eugene, kidnapping his look alike Brock instead. He is once again defeated and jailed for good. It is further revealed that he had hired Eugene and the Stabbington Brothers to steal the royal tiara as seen at the beginning of the movie.
- Mother Maud (voiced by Kathy Najimy) and Father Francis (voiced by Christian Borle) are two enigmatic individuals magicians who entrap Rapunzel and her friends by turning them into birds. They are defeated when Cassandra breaks their teapot, causing them to disappear.
- Petunia (voiced by Jill Matson-Sachoff) and William (voiced by Greg Grunberg) are a kindly couple who in actuality are the Daylight Thieves. They are confused for being Angry and Red's parents, but shed their guise. They are defeated and captured.
- Vodnik (voiced by Dee Bradley Baker) is strange aquatic beings that cause trouble for Rapunzel and her friends. They appear to be some kind of law enforcement who were in pursuit of Seraphina the mermaid. Rapunzel and Eugene encounter them again in an icy tundra.
- Virtuous St. Goodberry (voiced by Lil Rel Howery) is the jolly owner of a wrestling match who Rapunzel and Stalyan confront over the theft of a diamond.
- Malice Marauder (voiced by Danny Trejo) is Mr. Goodberry's biggest and toughest fighter. The series finale implies that she is related to Wreck Marauder.
- Hector (voiced by Kim Coates) is a violent member of the Brotherhood. He attempted to stop Adira from leading Rapunzel and her friends to the Dark Kingdom as he believed that terrible things would happen, if Rapunzel got it. He is defeated, but Adira spares him. Cassandra takes over his mind through the Mind Trap, but is saved by Eugene and Edmund, before returning to the Dark Kingdom to rebuild it.
- Tromus (voiced by Gavin Creel) is one of Zhan Tiri's disciples. He tricks Rapunzel and her friends into staying in his home, the House of Yesterday's Tomorrows, as Matthews. He uses magic mirrors to entrap them, followed by toys that turn them into children, before trapping Rapunzel in a dream state so that he can drain the power of the Sundrop from her into an idol of Zhan Tiri in order to release her. When Rapunzel awakens from her dream, Tromus and the house turn to sand.
- Captain Creighton (voiced by Artemis Pebdani) is a toughened monster hunter who attempted to hunt for a werewolf. Upon learning that Catalina was the werewolf, she heartlessly attempted to kill her to end the threat, but was stopped.
