= Pascal and Maximus =

Disney characters

- Tangled characters
- Maximus (left) and Pascal (right) as they appear in the short film Tangled Ever After.
- First appearance: Tangled (2010)
- Created by: Dan Fogelman
- Voiced by: Pascal and Maximus: Frank Welker (The original animated film); Dee Bradley Baker (Tangled: Before Ever After/Rapunzel's Tangled Adventure); Maximus only Nathan Greno (Tangled Ever After)

In-universe information
- Species: Pascal: Chameleon: Maximus: Horse
- Gender: Males
- Owner(s): Rapunzel and Flynn Rider

Pascal and Maximus are a pair of anthropomorphic non-talking animal characters who first appear in Walt Disney Pictures' animated film Tangled (2010) as supporting characters, and subsequently star in its short Tangled Ever After (2012), television film Tangled: Before Ever After and television series Rapunzel's Tangled Adventure. Created by screenwriter Dan Fogelman, both characters are usually left unvoiced. A comedic chameleon and horse duo, Pascal and Maximus serve as sidekicks to main characters Rapunzel and Flynn Rider, respectively.

In Tangled, Pascal resides alongside Rapunzel in Mother Gothel's tower, while Maximus is a police horse originally trained to arrest Flynn Rider before he befriends him at Rapunzel's insistence. In Tangled Ever After, Pascal and Maximus appear as ring bearers at Rapunzel and Flynn's wedding. When they lose the couple's wedding rings, the duo frantically attempts to retrieve them. Greno and Howard created Pascal in order to provide the lonely, isolated Rapunzel with a friend to talk to. Feeling that a reptile would complement Rapunzel's quirky personality, the directors ultimately decided to make the character a chameleon as opposed to a traditional woodland creature. Meanwhile, Maximus was originally conceived as a very serious horse based on actor Tommy Lee Jones until the animators decided to make him a funnier and more likeable character. The unusual decision to make Pascal and Maximus incomprehensible to both the audience and human characters with Welker providing them with realistic sound effects was inspired by the performances of silent film actors Charlie Chaplin and Buster Keaton.

Both individually and as a comedic duo, Pascal and Maximus have garnered universal acclaim from film critics, who referred to the characters as scene stealers – British magazine SFX dubbed Maximus the film's breakout star while The Age hailed the character as the funniest horse in film history – in addition to praising the fact that both characters are refreshingly funny, expressive and charismatic without the use of dialogue. Additionally, several film critics preferred Pascal and Maximus to the film's couple.

== Development ==
=== Conception ===
Filmmaker Walt Disney himself had first attempted to adapt the Brothers Grimm fairy tale "Rapunzel" into a feature-length animated film during the 1930s. However, he abandoned the project because the story was considered too "small." When they were approached to direct Tangled in 2008, directors Nathan Greno and Byron Howard decided that it would be best to update the story "for a modern audience", soon discovering "that the problem with having a prison character [like Rapunzel] ... is that they don't have anyone to talk to." Howard explained that because Rapunzel is incapable of having a decent conversation with Mother Gothel, the isolated, incarcerated heroine "needed someone to relate to." Unwilling to default to using the traditional "boring, ordinary side-kick," Greno and Howard created Pascal, conceiving the character as a chameleon because Rapunzel is, according to Greno, "a rough-and-tumble girl." Howard explained that "we wanted to do ... something fresh, something different. This girl, she's not a dainty, precious girl ... So what would she have? ... She's going to have a lizard." Additionally, Howard believed that a reptile would complement Rapunzel's personality best, describing the character as "a quirky pet for a quirky young woman."

We didn't want to do like a bird or a chipmunk or ... [s]quirrel ... you've seen it. You've seen all these things; this is the 50th movie that Disney's made. So what we wanted to do is something fresh, something different. This girl, she's not a dainty, precious girl. She is this rough and tumble girl next door ... She's not going to have a little, pretty bluebird on her shoulder. She's going to have a lizard. That is her. She's different. So when it came time, we put a lot of thought into this and Pascal, this little tough guy that sits on her shoulder.

— co-director Nathan Greno on Pascal's conception.

Howard originally envisioned Maximus as the "ultimate super-cop", jokingly referring to the character as "the Tommy Lee Jones of horses". Attempting to make Maximus feel like a "fresh" character, the filmmakers researched several historical horses from both animated and live-action films to ensure that the character would be unique and different enough from his predecessors. Greno explained that "Maximus ... could have easily slipped into the category of, 'Oh, I've seen that before.'" To prevent this, the filmmakers referenced "a board with photos of all the different animated horses that had been done". Howard explained that Maximus was originally conceived as a "pretty serious" character, but eventually developed into a funnier and more likeable horse as the animators continued to draw him with dog-like attributes. Both Pascal and Maximus, who according to the Austin American-Statesman are responsible for providing the film with the majority of its comic relief, were eventually written into the film by screenwriter Dan Fogelman. Analyzing the characters' roles in the film, HitFix observed that "There's a simplicity to it all that I admire, and you throw in a few anthropomorphized animals so everyone laughs a lot, and that's the Disney recipe". One critic wrote about Maximus:

"Horses have played a key role in armies and police forces around the world for hundreds of years, but Maximus is clearly one of a kind. Fearless in the face of danger, relentless in pursuit, and possessed of a nose befitting a bloodhound, this equine super-sleuth won't let anything stop him getting his man."

— Femalefirst

=== Characterization ===
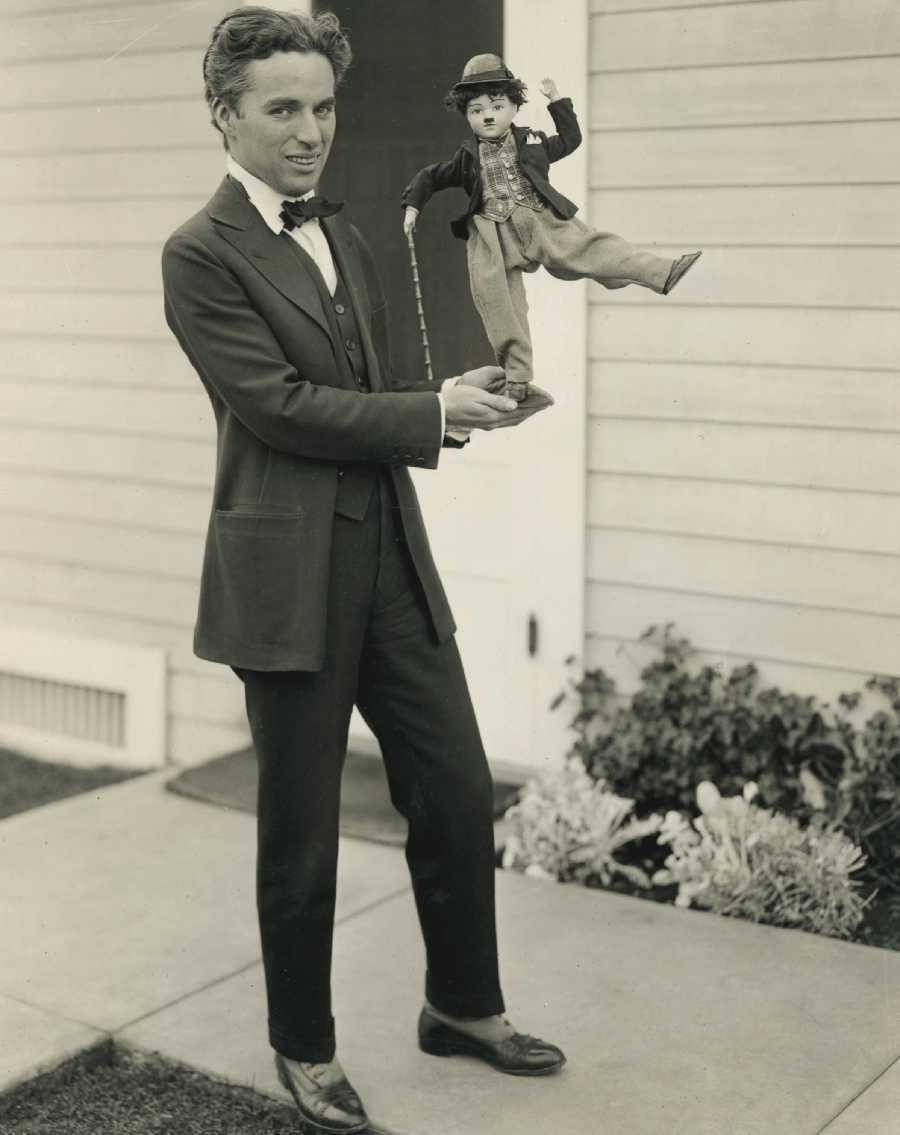
Both Pascal and Maximus were inspired by the performances of actor and comedian Charlie Chaplin in silent films.

Considered rare for Disney animals, Pascal and Maximus do not speak. The idea to make Pascal and Maximus mute was inspired by the performances of actors Charlie Chaplin and Buster Keaton in Silent films. Identifying themselves as "huge fans" of Chaplin, Greno and Howard suggested that it would be a good idea to have a character like the actor featured in the film. Additionally, the directors explained in an interview with Orange that Pascal and Maximus' silence was also inspired by the roles of Princess Aurora's animal friends in Disney's Sleeping Beauty (1959), following the film's rules and guidelines that even though they do not talk, they remain "very expressive" nonetheless and "act and understand without words." Maximus particularly "belongs to the grand tradition of Disney creatures that are full of personality even though they don't talk." One film critic observed that Pascal and Maximus "have personalities all their own, making use of techniques harkening back to the silent era". Howard explained that "Pantomime acting is a great challenge for our animators" because, according to animator Jin Kim, Pascal and Maximus both "had to be funny without speech", forcing the animators to exaggerate their emotions and facial expressions. The Chicago Sun-Times observed that "Pascal ... doesn't speak, but manages to convey himself with eye rolls and changes of color."

Pascal's supervising animator Lino DiSalvo told the Los Angeles Times that at one point the animators "weren't getting enough entertainment out of Pascal." DiSalvo elaborated, "originally, he was very realistic. He moved like a real chameleon," which in turn depicted him as very "cold." By exaggerating the character's shape and face, the animators eventually "amped [him] up" in order to make him funnier. The name "Pascal" was borrowed from a pet chameleon owned by Tangled animator Kellie Lewis. During production, Lewis' other pet chameleon and Pascal's mate hatched six eggs, in turn making Pascal a father. In tribute to Pascal, the directors included a "Chameleon Babies" credit in the film's closing credits, parodying the more traditional "Production babies" credit, while Lewis herself received a "Chameleon Wrangler" credit.

Discussing the likelihood a Tangled sequel, Howard explained to the Los Angeles Times "We don't want to do a sequel for the sake of sequels ... The story has to be worth telling." Because the original film "buttons up" well, the directors wanted to avoid simply creating a movie wedding featuring Rapunzel and Flynn because "that's not entertainment", so Greno and Howard conceived a funny story about Pascal and Maximus instead, providing the animators and writers with "an opportunity to do a lot of slapstick" that was mostly absent in Tangled. Wanting the film "to be a movie for everyone", the directors "figured out a way to give [the audience] exactly what they wanted, so there is a beautiful grand wedding in the short, but what happens pretty quickly, those two goofballs Maximus and Pascal lose the wedding rings ... It turned into this big, zany, cartoony, fun, action-packed short." In the short, Pascal and Maximus encounter "a trail of comical chaos that includes flying lanterns, a flock of doves, a wine barrel barricade and a very sticky finale".

== Appearances ==
=== Tangled ===
Pascal and Maximus first appear in Tangled (2010). Introduced as the pet and best friend of Rapunzel, Pascal is a chameleon who lives with Rapunzel in Mother Gothel's secluded tower. Although Rapunzel pretends to be happy living in isolation under Gothel's strict, controlling parenting, Pascal refuses to hide his discontent. Meanwhile, Maximus and thief Flynn Rider share a bitter animosity; as a police horse, Maximus is determined to arrest Flynn Rider for stealing a crown. Seeking refuge from Maximus, Flynn hides in Gothel's tower where he is quickly incapacitated by Rapunzel, and he and Pascal immediately adopt a love-hate relationship. Determined to see the mysterious "floating lights" in time for her eighteenth birthday, Rapunzel agrees to return Flynn's crown to him only after he escorts her to safely to the kingdom. Meanwhile, Maximus, who continues his search for Flynn, inadvertently tips off Gothel that Rapunzel, on whose magical hair she relies to stay alive, has left the tower accompanied by Flynn. With her life in danger, she desperately pursues them.

When Maximus eventually catches up with Rapunzel, Flynn and Pascal, the horse attempts to apprehend Flynn only to be charmed by Rapunzel, who convinces him to leave Flynn alone until they have arrived at their destination while Pascal ensures that the two maintain a healthy relationship. In the kingdom, Flynn, Rapunzel and Pascal embark on a canoe ride to see the floating lights, revealed to be lanterns, up-close, while Maximus is forced to wait ashore as there is not enough room for him. In a friendly gesture, Flynn gives him a bag of apples. Realizing that he is falling in love with Rapunzel, Flynn attempts to hand off the crown he was promised to the Stabbington brothers, two colleagues of his, only to be kidnapped and handed over to the police. Mistaking this for abandonment, Rapunzel is taken back to the tower by Gothel, who has caught up with them.

Maximus manages to help an imprisoned Flynn about to be hanged for his crimes and escape from the dungeon then gets him to Gothel's tower, where he is stabbed. However, Rapunzel eventually heals Flynn after he slices off her hair, which in turn destroys Gothel, and they live happily every after Pascal and Maximus move to Corona with them; Maximus is eventually knighted, becoming Captain of the Guards and eliminates crime in the kingdom.

=== Tangled Ever After ===
Tangled Ever After takes place sometime after the events of the original movie. In the short, Pascal and Maximus are ring bearers at Rapunzel and Flynn Rider's wedding. When Maximus suffers a reaction from one of the flower petals Pascal is sprinkling along the aisle, Maximus sneezes and the rings are propelled off the pillow on which he is carrying the rings; the fly through a window in the chapel and into the city streets. Pascal and Maximus discreetly sneak out of the chapel to retrieve them in time for Rapunzel and Flynn to exchange them. Pascal and Maximus encounter several obstacles and hindrances in their attempt, eventually crashing into a tar factor upon retrieving the rings from a flock of flying doves. Completely soiled, Pascal and Maximus finally return to the chapel and return the rings, only to cause the wedding cake to roll out the door.

=== Tangled: Before Ever After ===
Pascal is now living in the Castle of Corona with his longtime best friend and her boyfriend, Eugene. He later creates an illusion of Rapunzel to keep Eugene from finding out that she had gone out the walls of Corona.

Maximus is ridden by Eugene in a race against Rapunzel, riding Fidela, and the Guards. At night he accompanies Cassandra and Rapunzel on their sneaking out, and tries to cross the shattering stone bridge. He runs back to release Rapunzel's newly regrown blonde hair from the broken bridge.

=== Rapunzel's Tangled Adventure ===
Pascal continues to live with Rapunzel at the castle of Corona. Although he seems to like helping Rapunzel adjust to her new royal life, he eventually starts to feel he doesn't belong with her and runs away, to Rapunzel's isolated tower in the deepest parts of the forest. In Episode 11, it is revealed that, as a baby, his mother had sent him to safety on a lily-pad to escape a ravenous snake that was pursuing them. As his mother was eaten by the snake, he had floated down a waterfall, where he heard young Rapunzel singing. He climbed her tower but was still being followed by the snake which infected him with its lethal venom. It was then that the young Rapunzel used the light-based, healing magic of her blond hair to return him to life. She welcomed the infant chameleon as her best friend, that way they would never have to be alone again. Upon returning to the ivy-covered tower, he is again attacked by the white snake that had killed his mother. Fortunately, his time with Rapunzel had made him brave, and he fends off the snake until Rapunzel arrives.

Maximus continues to be the guard's greatest steed in arresting criminals in all of Corona. He seems to have feelings for a female horse named Fidella.

=== Video games ===
Both Pascal and Maximus appear in the Nintendo DS version of Tangled: The Video Game (2010). While playing mostly as Rapunzel, players are allowed to "interact with Flynn, Pascal, and Maximus", according to Nintendo.com. The video game includes a minigame inspired by Pascal entitled "Pascal's Colors/Melody Match".

Pascal and Maximus appear as supporting characters in Kingdom Hearts III (2019), fulfilling the same role as in Tangled in the world based on the film.

== Reception ==
=== Critical response ===
Pascal and Maximus have garnered universal acclaim from film critics, who greeted both characters with nearly equal praise but generally reviewed Maximus more enthusiastically. Citing both characters as "right on the money," Jonathan Crocker of Total Film described Maximus as "A horse ... who thinks he's John McClane." Kerry Lengel of The Arizona Republic enthused, "In true Disney fashion, two of the most memorable characters are animals: Pascal ... and Maximus, a barrel-chested horse with the tracking skills of a bloodhound and a sense of duty straight out of Gilbert and Sullivan." The Chicago Tribune's Michael Phillips wrote that both characters are "Very funny, very noble" and "lovely supporting character[s]." Peter Travers of Rolling Stone admitted to having "fell hard" for Maximus and Pascal. Similarly, Lindsey Ward of Canoe.ca predicted Tangled Ever After, writing, "Kids and adults alike will also fall for Rapunzel's trusty chameleon sidekick Pascal and palace horse Maximus -- whose hilarious role as Flynn's foe-turned-BFF might just earn him his own spin-off." The Globe and Mail's Jennie Punter hailed them as "characters that only Disney animators could so memorably portray." Writing for the Miami Herald, Rene Rodriguez described both characters as "terrific," while Alison Gang of U-T San Diego called them "hilarious." David Edelstein of Vulture.com admitted that he "can't help liking a movie with chameleon reaction shots." Joe Neumaier of the Daily News appreciated the fact that although "There are laughs involving ... Rapunzel's silent chameleon sidekick ... directors Nathan Greno and Byron Howard keep the tale grounded." Observing the way in which animal sidekicks have become "Disney animation staples," Doris Toumarkine of Film Journal International wrote that Pascal is "cute-as-can-be," likening the character to Jiminy Cricket from Disney's Pinocchio (1940). Matt Brunson of Creative Loafing wrote that Pascal "is likely to charm the adults, further designating Tangled as silky-smooth entertainment." Norman Wilner of Now wrote that "the best performance is a silent one delivered by ... Maximus, a guardsman's horse clearly modelled on Tommy Lee Jones in The Fugitive – but funnier." Describing the character as "marvelously bothered," Michelle Orange of Movieline wrote that Maximus is "given a nuanced fidelity and expressive agility so precise that it seems more human than human." Cynthia Fuchs of PopMatters called Maximus "magnificent." Empire's Helen O'Hara wrote that Maximus is a "comic scene-stealer and police horse extraordinaire." While Ian Berriman of SFX dubbed Maximus the film's "breakout star," The Age's Jim Schembri hailed the character as "the funniest horse in film history." Sandra Hall of The Sydney Morning Herald labelled Maximus "The de facto star of ... Tangled" who "possesses the strength of Hercules, the nose of an airport sniffer dog and the crankiness of Harrison Ford."

[The music] would be the highlight of "Tangled" were it not for Maximus, who doesn't get to sing because he's a horse. The prize steed of the royal guard, Maximus pursues Flynn doggedly—and I do mean 'like a dog,' complete with ground-sniffing and tail-wagging. The animators have filled this valiant fellow with personality and charisma.

— The Oregonian's Shawn Levy.

According to Greno and Howard, the decision to make Pascal and Maximus non-speaking characters has been appreciated by both critics and audiences alike, explaining, "We've gotten so many compliments about him and Pascal ... and so many people saying: 'Thank you for not making them talk.'" Hailing Pascal and Maximus as "delightful supporting characters who continue yet another Disney custom without saying a word of dialogue", Leonard Martin of IndieWire compared Pascal to a "comic Greek chorus" while dubbing Maximus "an extraordinarily expressive equine adversary ... who earns many of the movie's biggest laughs. Similarly, The Wall Street Journal's Joe Morgenstern wrote, "No one voices Maximus ... but he steals every scene he's in", while calling Pascal "endearing". The Quad-City Times' Linda Cook reviewed, "it's fun to watch the animal sidekicks express themselves, not through words, but facial expressions and body movements. The critters provide much of the comedy", while Steve Persall of the Tampa Bay Times penned, "No talking animals here, although when they're as amusing as a loyal chameleon and a horse who's partly bloodhound and cop-flick action hero, they don't need to speak", joking that the Brothers Grimm "probably wouldn't object." ABC Online "like[d] the way the animals were used", explaining, "They don't talk ... it really is funny", accrediting this to executive producer John Lasseter's influence on the film. Criticizing the script's "abundant chatter," Justin Chang of Variety commended the filmmaker's "shrewd decision to have the animal sidekicks ... express themselves without the benefit of speech." Similarly, Richard Corliss of Time wrote that both characters "radiate plenty of personality without speaking."

Critics who were generally less positive in their opinions of Tangled and its main characters Rapunzel and Flynn Rider were otherwise impressed by Pascal and Maximus' performances. The Liverpool Echo's Catherine Jones felt that "Pascal and Maximus shamelessly scene-steal from the human characters". The Illinois Times' Chuck Koplinski wrote, "Throw in two animal sidekicks – wily horse Maximus and protective chameleon Pascal – and you have a film that, while not as moving as the Pixar movies, is a satisfying lark." TV Guide opined that although "There's nothing particularly innovative about Dan Fogelman's screenplay", the author wrote that "a cute animal sidekick ... extend[s] to the visual aspects of the film". Similarly, Simon Reynolds of Digital Spy wrote, "This ride's a familiar one, but with humourous [sic] sidekicks such as horse-who-thinks-he's-a-dog Maximus and chameleon Pascal, it's thoroughly enjoyable." Although Dave White of Movies.com strongly panned Tangled, he dubbed Pascal and Maximus the film's "Most Memorable Cliché", writing that the characters "are better than the movie deserves." White continued, "they both steal scene after scene from the Cream of Wheat-like main characters", concluding, "I kept wishing I was watching a movie about just them." The Independent's Anthony Quinn, who was ambivalent towards the film, admitted that Pascal and Maximus "provide some chuckles." Similarly, Tom Huddleston of Time Out wrote, "With two such bland heroes, it's good that plenty of attention is paid to the supporting characters, notably ... a bad tempered but loveable horse", while Todd Hertz of Christianity Today called Maximus "a more complex, multi-dimensional character than some movies' leads". Despite calling the film "bland", the Houston Chronicle's Amy Biancolli called Maximus a "stone cool" character. Tyler Hanley Palo Alto Weekly, however, praised the entire ensemble as a whole, calling Rapunzel, Flynn, Pascal and Maximus "a thoroughly enjoyable quartet." In a lone lukewarm review, James Berardinelli of ReelViews called Pascal "among the least recognizable animal sidekicks (although he possesses amusing mannerisms)."

In 2013, M Magazine ranked Maximus the sixth best Disney sidekick, while Pascal was ranked eighth. In 2014, BuzzFeed organized a list of the "Definitive Ranking of Disney Sidekicks", ranking Pascal and Maximus fourth and fourteenth, respectively. Author Jemima Skelley described Pascal as "The most badass chameleon there ever was" while hailing Maximus as "The fiercest horse you've probably ever seen." Unranked, Glamour slightly preferred Pascal to Maximus in the magazine's article "Our Favorite Disney Animals of All Time".

=== Merchandise ===
Tom Huddleston of Total Film predicted that the popularity of Pascal and Maximus, combined with the success of Tangled, would ultimately provide Disney with promising merchandising opportunities, describing the characters as "tie-in toys you just pre-ordered in your head," while Keith Uhlich of Time Out called them "action-figure ready." Pascal's likeness has since been adapted into a wide variety of items, including toys, decorations and ornaments, costumes, clothing, jewellery and cosmetics, as demonstrated by the Disney Store's website. In much of the film's merchandise, Pascal is included alongside Rapunzel, namely play sets; The Rapunzel Tangled Figure Play Set features miniature figurines of both Pascal and Maximus in addition to Rapunzel, Flynn Rider and Mother Gothel. However, merchandise inspired by Maximus remains less common. The character's likeness has, however, been adapted into a plush toy.
