= Entanglement =

Entanglement may refer to:

- Quantum entanglement
- Orientation entanglement
- Entanglement (graph measure)
- Entanglement of polymer chains, see Reptation
- Wire entanglement
- in fishery: method by which fish are caught in fishing nets
  - unintended entanglement of marine fish and mammals in ghost nets or similar: Plastic pollution#Entanglement

== Art ==
- Entanglement (film)
- "Entanglement", a season one episode of Touch
- "Entanglement" (Star Wars Rebels)
- Entanglement (opera), a 2015 chamber opera by Charlotte Bray and the librettist Amy Rosenthal
- "Entanglement", a song by Charlotte Church from Four
- Entanglements, an album by Parenthetical Girls

== See also ==
- Entangled (disambiguation)
