= Tangle =

Tangle may refer to:

== Arts and entertainment ==
=== Fictional characters ===
- Tangle, a character in The Golden Key by George MacDonald
- Tangle the Lemur, a character from IDW Publishing comic series Sonic the Hedgehog

=== Music ===
- Tangle (album), by Thinking Fellers Union Local 282, 1989
- Tangle, a 2016 EP by Trash Talk
- Tangles, a 2005 album by S. J. Tucker

=== Other uses in arts and entertainment ===
- Tangles, a 2026 adult animated biographical drama film
- "Tangles", a 2022 story by Seanan McGuire
- Tangle News, an online newsletter founded by Isaac Saul
- Tangle (TV series), an Australian drama

== Science and technology ==
- The Tangle, the transaction settlement and data integrity layer of the IOTA distributed ledger
- Tangle (mathematics), either of two related concepts
- Tangle, a multipartite entanglement measure
- Neurofibrillary tangle, a primary biomarker of Alzheimer's disease
- TANGLE, a secondary program of the Web programming system
- Tangle, a former social network of Godtube

== See also ==
- Tangled (disambiguation)
- Knot
- Rectangle
- Sea-tangle tents, the dried stalks of Laminaria digitata
