= Entangled =

Entangled may refer to:

- Entangled state, in physics, a state arising from quantum entanglement
- Entangled (film), a 1993 film starring Judd Nelson and Pierce Brosnan
- Entangled (Partington), a 2004 abstract sculpture created by Brose Partington
- "Entangled" (song), a song by Genesis from the 1976 album A Trick of the Tail
- "Entangled" (Red Dwarf), the fourth episode of series 10 of the science fiction sitcom Red Dwarf
- Entangled Publishing, a book publisher

== See also ==
- Entanglement (disambiguation)
- Entangling alliances
- Tangled (disambiguation)
