= Tangled Up in Blue (disambiguation) =

Tangled Up in Blue is a song by American musician Bob Dylan.

Tangled Up in Blue may also refer to:

- Tangled Up in Blue: Blue Labour and the Struggle for Labour's Soul, a 2011 book by Rowenna Davis
- Tangled Up in Blue (film), an upcoming film written and directed by Jamie Adams
- Tangled Up in Blue: Policing the American City, a 2021 book by Rosa Brooks
- "Tangled Up in Blue", a 2018 episode of the American television show The Conners

== See also ==
- Tangled Up in Blues, a 1999 album of covers of Bob Dylan songs
