= Tangled Ever After =

- Directed by: Nathan Greno; Byron Howard
- Written by: Nathan Greno; Byron Howard
- Produced by: Aimee Scribner
- Edited by: David Bess; Lisa Linder; Tim Mertens
- Music by: Kevin McCallister
- Production company: Walt Disney Animation Studios
- Distributed by: Walt Disney Studios; Motion Pictures (Note: Distributed by Walt Disney Studios Motion Pictures through the Walt Disney Pictures banner.)
- Release date: January 13, 2012; (with Beauty and the Beast 3D)
- Running time: 6 minutes
- Country: United States
- Language: English

Tangled Ever After is a 2012 American animated short film written and directed by Nathan Greno and Byron Howard, serving as a sequel to the 2010 Disney animated film Tangled. It premiered in theaters on January 13, 2012, before the 3D theatrical re-release of Beauty and the Beast, and on Disney Channel followed by the premiere of The Princess and the Frog on March 23, 2012. In fall 2012, the short was included as a bonus feature on the Diamond Edition of Cinderella. It was also released three years later, on the Walt Disney Animation Studios Short Films Collection Blu-ray on August 18, 2015. The short is also available as a stand-alone download on iTunes.

The animated short picks up approximately three years after the events of Tangled, explored throughout Rapunzel's Tangled Adventure, from the television film, Tangled: Before Ever After to the three-part series finale, "Plus est en Vous". In the short, the kingdom prepares for the long-awaited royal wedding of Rapunzel and Flynn Rider (Eugene Fitzherbert). However, chameleon Pascal and horse Maximus lose the wedding rings, triggering a frenzied search to retrieve them.

Greno and Howard created the film short after popular demand. Among the film's voice actors are Mandy Moore, Zachary Levi, and Matt Nolan.

== Plot ==
On Rapunzel and Eugene's wedding day, Pascal and Maximus are the ring bearers and are spreading the flowers. When the priest starts talking, one of the flowers falls and Maximus sniffs it and he sneezes causing the rings to be launched outside of the castle. While in shock, the priest asks them for the rings, only to find them gone. The Queen complains that it was her grandmother's wedding rings and one of the guards says that the kingdom is lost. This causes much chaos around the kingdom and there are explosions, but it was revealed to be Maximus' daydream. With more time, they go after the rings only to be launched in two directions.

One of them lands in a pot of soup and Pascal goes after it. When coming out, he causes chaos around the tables and finally retrieves the ring, only to find his tongue stuck in an ice sculpture. Meanwhile, Maximus runs after the other ring, but he runs into dresses, shoes, make-up, and hats and he is now dressed as a lady. A male horse mistakes Maximus for a female and falls in love with him, but he kicks him and goes after the ring. Pascal finally gets his tongue off the ice, but he lands on a waiter's foot, causing him to drop the lintels on the ice and it launches into the air. Maximus manages to retrieve the other ring, but the ice sculpture lands on a catapult he is sitting on and is launched into the air and passes the windows where the ceremony is. He lands in a carriage and goes after the ring.

Meanwhile, Pascal goes after the ring and it lands on a girl's lantern. He chases after it, only for him to be shocked when he finds out it is in hundreds of lanterns. Maximus manages to retrieve the ring, but his face is knocked by several frying pans before hitting a giant frying pan. This causes a few residents to think it was a gong and they release the doves and the lanterns. Pascal finally finds the ring, but realizes he is very high. Meanwhile, the carriage Maximus is in finally stops and is launched into the air, passing Pascal, but he does not know that and looks at the camera. He lands on a decoration and a flock of doves passes Pascal, causing him to lose the ring. It hits a wind vane, a fountain, a decoration and a hook and finally lands on a dove's foot.

Maximus hits the ground, but the hook that the ring landed on causes barrels of juice to chase Maximus and Pascal. When coming to a dead end of fire, Maximus uses one of the decorations as a slingshot and launches them into the air for Pascal to grab the ring. Unfortunately, he misses, but he uses his tongue to grab it. Now with both rings secured, they land in a tar factory. Just as the priest finishes, he asks for the ring, only to find Pascal and Maximus covered in tar and they hand them the rings. The priest declares them husband and wife and they kiss. Just as everybody cheers, Maximus accidentally causes the cake trolley to roll out of the castle.

== Cast ==
- Mandy Moore as Princess Rapunzel
- Zachary Levi as Eugene Fitzherbert
- Alan Dale as Priest
- Paul F. Tompkins as Short Thug
- Kari Wahlgren as Queen Arianna
- Mark Allan Stewart as Dove Caller
- Byron Howard as Lantern Wrangler / Chef (voice)
- Nathan Greno as Maximus / Guard / Stabbington brothers
- Matt Nolan as Frying Pan Caller

== Home media ==
Tangled Ever After was first released on Cinderella: Diamond Edition on October 2, 2012. It was also later released on the Walt Disney Animation Studios Short Films Collection Blu-ray on August 18, 2015.
