= Tangled: Before Ever After =

2017 American animated television film

- Promotional poster
- Genre: Fantasy comedy Musical; Adventure
- Based on: Tangled
- Developed by: Shane Prigmore; Chris Sonnenburg
- Story by: Jase Ricci
- Directed by: Tom Caulfield; Stephen Sandoval
- Starring: Mandy Moore; Zachary Levi; Eden Espinosa; Clancy Brown; Julie Bowen
- Composers: Alan Menken (music); Glenn Slater (lyrics); Kevin Kliesch (score)
- Country of origin: United States
- Original language: English

Production
- Running time: 55 minutes
- Production companies: Disney Television Animation; Mercury Filmworks

Original release
- Network: Disney Channel
- Release: March 10, 2017

Related
- Tangled; Tangled Ever After; Rapunzel's Tangled Adventure

Tangled: Before Ever After is a 2017 American animated fantasy film produced by Disney Television Animation, that premiered on Disney Channel as a Disney Channel Original Movie. It is a sequel to the Walt Disney Animation Studios film Tangled and takes place between the original 2010 film and the short Tangled Ever After, and serves as the first episode to Rapunzel's Tangled Adventure. It was directed by Tom Caulfield and Stephen Sandoval. The film centers on Rapunzel's adjustments to the life of a princess, and the mysterious return of her 70 feet (21 m) of magical, golden hair.

The film premiered on March 10, 2017, on Disney Channel. It features two new songs, "Life After Happily Ever After" and "Wind in My Hair", from Alan Menken and Glenn Slater, who together wrote the songs for the original film. "Wind in My Hair" would go on to become the opening theme of Rapunzel's Tangled Adventure. Mandy Moore, Zachary Levi, and M. C. Gainey reprise their roles from Tangled as Rapunzel, Eugene Fitzherbert, and the Captain of the Guard, respectively. It is the fourth animated Disney Channel Original Movie following Kim Possible Movie: So the Drama, The Proud Family Movie, and Phineas and Ferb the Movie: Across the 2nd Dimension, and the first of them to be based on a Walt Disney Animation Studios film. It is also the second Disney Channel Original Movie based on material from Walt Disney Animation Studios, after the 2015 live-action film Descendants.

== Plot ==
Six months after the events of Tangled, Rapunzel is set to become the official Princess of Corona. However, on the day before her coronation ceremony, Rapunzel and Eugene Fitzherbert, riding Maximus and Fidella, are out in the forest racing each other to the border wall with the Royal Guards in pursuit. Rapunzel is the first to make it to the wall and climbs to the top where she sees on the other side a magnificent view of the land beyond the kingdom. After a while the guards catch up and escort the two of them back to the castle.

Upon returning to the castle, Cassandra, Rapunzel's lady-in-waiting, is waiting for her. Cassandra has been given the task to care for Rapunzel and help her adjust to life as the princess. While Rapunzel is happy to be reunited with her parents, she struggles to adjust to her new life as a princess. She tries her best but she feels overwhelmed with the amount of responsibility that comes with being a princess and because of his fear of losing her again, her father, King Frederic, denies her desire to explore the world and has heavy security placed around her. On the eve of her coronation, Eugene builds up the courage to propose to her. Rapunzel is shocked and delighted but, despite her love for him, she does not feel ready to marry him and rejects his proposal. Returning to her room, Cassandra believes Rapunzel could use some down time and offers to sneak her out and take her beyond Corona's security wall.

Rapunzel and Cassandra sneak out of the castle and venture into the woods. Cassandra takes Rapunzel to the former location of the healing flower that saved her and her mother. In its place, mysterious thornlike rocks have appeared that are unbreakable. As Rapunzel examines the area, she is struck by magic the moment she lays a finger on one of the rocks. Part of her hair begins to glow, and more of those mysterious rocks suddenly sprout from the ground. Rapunzel and Cassandra run away, chased by a trail of sprouting rocks. When they make it out of the woods, Rapunzel's long blonde hair has grown back, with Rapunzel and Cassandra not having a clue why. As the morning of her coronation day rises, Rapunzel and Cassandra sneak back into the castle and try to get rid of the hair, but they discover that it is unbreakable like the thorns. Eugene sneaks into the room and discovers the hair, but they all know that Rapunzel's parents cannot know about it. In order to hide it, Rapunzel wears an over-sized wig. While Rapunzel is having breakfast with her parents, several crooks (under the orders of the mysterious Lady Caine) are committing crimes throughout the kingdom to intentionally get caught and be taken to the dungeons of the castle.

During Rapunzel's coronation ceremony, the royal family is confronted by Lady Caine, who had disguised herself as a visiting duchess and freed the prisoners from the dungeons. Lady Caine seeks vengeance on Frederic for imprisoning her father, whom she describes as "a simple petty thief", because Frederic imprisoned every criminal in the kingdom after Rapunzel was kidnapped by Mother Gothel when she was a baby, regardless of how severe their crimes were. While Frederic and the rest of the royal guests are locked in a cage, Rapunzel reveals her golden hair and uses it as a weapon to defeat the criminals with Eugene and Cassandra's help and Lady Caine and her pirate crew are arrested. Despite proving her worth, Frederic feels more insecure about Rapunzel's safety than ever before and learning the truth about her sneaking out, he forbids her to leave Corona again without his permission.

Hurt by her father's decision, Rapunzel feels trapped once more but Eugene arrives and comforts her, uplifting her spirits. He apologizes for putting her on the spot with his proposal and Rapunzel apologizes for her reaction. Eugene promises Rapunzel that despite not understanding her decision, he will take their relationship slow. After he leaves, Rapunzel reads a message in the journal given to her by her mother, Queen Arianna, and becomes inspired to live her life to the fullest despite the obstacles she will have to face.

A while later, a mysterious individual comes across the site of the magical flower, with more of the rocks now covering the area.

== Cast ==
- Mandy Moore as Rapunzel
- Zachary Levi as Eugene "Flynn Rider" Fitzherbert
- Eden Espinosa as Cassandra
- Julie Bowen as Queen Arianna
- Clancy Brown as King Frederic
- Jeffrey Tambor as Big Nose
- Sean Hayes as Pete the Guard
- Paul F. Tompkins as Shorty
- Diedrich Bader as Stan the Guard
- M. C. Gainey as Captain of the Guard
- Laura Benanti as Lady Caine
- Steven Blum as Attila Buckethead
- Jess Harnell as Pocket
- Kevin Michael Richardson as Otter
- Alan Dale as The Vicar

Non-speaking animal characters include Rapunzel's pet chameleon Pascal, and Maximus, the horse of the head of the palace guard.

== Production ==
On June 3, 2015, Disney Channel announced the development of a Tangled television series. During the premiere of The Swap, a trailer for the series aired, revealing that the series would take place between the events of Tangled and Tangled Ever After, and that a television film entitled Tangled: Before Ever After would air before the series, serving as its pilot. The series would then be known as Tangled: The Series, and then later as Rapunzel's Tangled Adventure. The trailer showed Rapunzel mysteriously regrowing her previous 70 feet of hair. It also introduced a new character, Cassandra.

== Reception ==
IGN reviewer Amy Ratcliffe praised the movie's sense of charm, fun, enjoyableness, and entertainment, ultimately rating it 8.3 out of 10. Luke Bonanno of DVDDizzy deemed the "slight but diverting" film a worthy product if the viewer expects a television series tie-in rather than a full-blown sequel to Tangled. Common Sense Media gave the film a rating of 4/5 stars, with reviewer Emily Ashby calling the movie "enjoyable" and "delightful." She also called Rapunzel a continually "refreshing heroine for kids in the audience" and reminding viewers that choices create "consequences for other people." LRM liked the film, describing it as "gorgeous," while commenting that it is aimed at younger viewers, even though it can be enjoyed by everyone. He also criticized the story's villains for being underdeveloped, even as he praised the "bright colors and fun designs" of the animation. At the same time, Lena Wilson of Screen Rant found the animation style jarring as compared to the original film, although she stated that it would be a "fun way" to jump back into Rapunzel's world and has the "happy-go-lucky spirit" of the first film. The film was viewed by almost 2.9 million viewers on its premiere night, comprising more women than men who were between ages 18–49.

=== Awards and nominations ===
Year	Award	Category	Nominee	Result	Ref.
2018	Annie Award	Best Animated Special Production	Disney Television Animation	Nominated	
2018	Annie Award	Outstanding Achievement for Character Design in an Animated Television/Broadcast Production	Shane Prigmore	Nominated	
2018	Annie Award	Outstanding Achievement for Character Design in an Animated Television/Broadcast Production	Bobby Pontillas	Nominated	
2018	Annie Award	Outstanding Achievement for Character Design in an Animated Television/Broadcast Production	Taylor Krahenbuhl	Nominated	
2018	Annie Award	Outstanding Achievement for Character Design in an Animated Television/Broadcast Production	Mayumi Nose	Nominated	
2018	Annie Award	Outstanding Achievement for Directing in an Animated Television/Broadcast Production	Tom Caulfield	Nominated	
2018	Annie Award	Outstanding Achievement for Directing in an Animated Television/Broadcast Production	Stephen Sandoval	Nominated	

== See also ==
- Tangled (franchise)
  - Tangled (2010)
  - Tangled Ever After (2012)
  - Rapunzel's Tangled Adventure (2017–20)
