= Tangled =

2010 animated Disney film

- Theatrical release poster
- Directed by: Nathan Greno; Byron Howard
- Screenplay by: Dan Fogelman
- Based on: "Rapunzel" by the Brothers Grimm
- Produced by: Roy Conli
- Starring: Mandy Moore; Zachary Levi; Donna Murphy
- Edited by: Tim Mertens
- Music by: Alan Menken
- Production company: Walt Disney Animation Studios
- Distributed by: Walt Disney Studios; Motion Pictures (Note: Distributed under the Walt Disney Pictures banner.)
- Release dates: November 14, 2010 (El Capitan Theatre); November 24, 2010 (United States)
- Running time: 100 minutes
- Country: United States
- Language: English
- Budget: $260 million
- Box office: $592.5 million

Tangled is a 2010 American animated musical fantasy comedy film directed by Nathan Greno and Byron Howard, written by Dan Fogelman, and loosely based on the German fairy tale "Rapunzel". Produced by Walt Disney Animation Studios, it stars Mandy Moore, Zachary Levi, and Donna Murphy. The film tells the story of Rapunzel (Moore), a young princess with magical long blonde hair who tries to leave her secret tower. She accepts the aid of an intruder, the outlaw Flynn Rider (Levi), to take her out into the world which she has never seen.

Originally conceived and proposed by Disney animator Glen Keane in 2001, Tangled spent six years in production at a cost that has been estimated at $260 million, making it the most expensive animated feature film ever made and one of the most expensive films of all time. The film employed a unique artistic style by blending together features of computer-generated imagery (CGI) and traditional animation while using non-photorealistic rendering to create the impression of a painting. Composer Alan Menken, who had collaborated on prior Disney animated features, returned to score Tangled, and also wrote the film's songs with lyricist Glenn Slater. Before the film's release, its title was changed from Rapunzel to Tangled, reportedly to market the film gender-neutrally.

Tangled premiered at the El Capitan Theatre in Los Angeles on November 14, 2010, and was released on November 24 by Walt Disney Pictures. The film earned $592 million and became the eighth-highest-grossing film of 2010. Tangled received positive reviews from critics, with particular praise for the animation, and was nominated for several awards, including Best Original Song at the 83rd Academy Awards. It was Richard Kiel's last film role before he died in 2014.

Tangled spawned a franchise, including a short film, Tangled Ever After (2012), a video game, a stage musical, and a television series which premiered in 2017. A live-action adaptation directed by Michael Gracey and starring Teagan Croft and Milo Manheim is scheduled for release in 2028.

== Plot ==
A drop of sunlight falls from the sky and produces a magic flower with healing properties. For centuries, Gothel used the flower to retain her youth, until it is taken by soldiers from the kingdom of Corona and used to save their very ill, pregnant queen. She gives birth to Rapunzel, whose blonde hair contains the flower's magic. At night, Gothel sneaks into the castle and cuts a lock of her hair, but it turns brown and loses its magic. Gothel then abducts Rapunzel and raises her in a hidden tower in the woods, keeping Rapunzel's magic for herself. Each year on Rapunzel's birthday, the king and queen release sky lanterns, hoping they will guide Rapunzel home. Unaware of her royal identity, Rapunzel grows up isolated from the kingdom, believing the tower to be her only safe home.

Growing up, Rapunzel is fascinated by the annual lights. On the eve of her 18th birthday, she asks to leave the tower and investigate them, but Gothel refuses, maintaining her claim that the outside world is too dangerous. Meanwhile, a runaway common thief, Flynn Rider, steals the lost princess's tiara from the palace, betrays the Stabbington brothers, his partners-in-crime, and is pursued by royal guard-horse Maximus. Flynn discovers and takes refuge in Rapunzel's tower, where she knocks him out and hides him. When Gothel berates Rapunzel for mentioning the lanterns again and refuses to let her ever leave the tower, Rapunzel hatches a new plan and asks Gothel for new paint as a gift, sending her on a three-day journey. After hiding Flynn's satchel containing the tiara, Rapunzel strikes a deal with Flynn, promising to return the tiara in exchange for taking her to see the lanterns.

Outdoors for the first time since infancy, Rapunzel experiences conflicting feelings of excitement and guilt. Flynn takes her to the Snuggly Duckling pub, where thugs try to capture the wanted Flynn, but Rapunzel charms them into revealing their softer and friendly sides. When royal guards arrive, the thugs help Rapunzel and Flynn escape. Flynn and Rapunzel become trapped in a fast-flooded cave; believing they will suffocate, Flynn reveals his true name: Eugene Fitzherbert. Rapunzel shows him the magic glow of her hair, revealing a hidden underwater exit, and they escape. Meanwhile, Gothel returns to the empty tower and finds the satchel with the tiara and a wanted poster of Eugene. Inspired by the discovery, Gothel finds the Stabbington brothers and strikes a deal with them to find Rapunzel. That night, Gothel confronts Rapunzel alone and gives her the satchel, telling her to give it to Eugene to test his loyalty.

The next morning, Maximus tracks down Eugene and attempts to arrest him, but Rapunzel convinces them to strike a truce. Rapunzel and Eugene enter the kingdom and attend a festival in honor of the "lost princess". After a day of celebration, they sail onto the lake to watch the release of the lanterns. Rapunzel gives Eugene the tiara, and they confess their mutual love. When Eugene sees the Stabbingtons on the shore, he goes to apologize and offers them the tiara. The brothers tie Eugene up, tricking Rapunzel into thinking he abandoned her. They try to capture Rapunzel, but Gothel stages a rescue by knocking the Stabbingtons out and takes Rapunzel back to the tower.

Eugene is arrested, but Maximus and the pub thugs help him escape. Meanwhile, Rapunzel realizes that she has subconsciously incorporated the kingdom's standard, a golden sun, into her artwork throughout her life. Realizing that she is the "lost princess", Rapunzel confronts and disowns Gothel. Gothel initially denies it, but realizing she cannot fake her love for Rapunzel anymore, she reveals her true nature. Eugene arrives at the tower, but is tricked and stabbed by Gothel with her dagger. Gothel attempts to take the chained and gagged Rapunzel away, but Rapunzel promises she will never stop defying Gothel and attempting to escape, unless Gothel allows her to heal the dying Eugene. Gothel reluctantly agrees, but Eugene, realizing Rapunzel would spend the rest of her life in captivity, cuts off her long hair before she can heal him. Rapunzel's hair turns brown and loses its magic, and a horrified Gothel suddenly ages rapidly before falling from the tower and disintegrating. Eugene apparently dies in Rapunzel's arms, but as a heartbroken Rapunzel mourns Eugene, he is revived and healed by the flower's magic in one of her tears.

Rapunzel and Eugene return to Corona, where Rapunzel is reunited with her birth parents. Eugene is pardoned for his crimes and the kingdom celebrates. Rapunzel and Eugene eventually marry.

== Voice cast ==
- Mandy Moore – Rapunzel
  - Delaney Rose Stein – young Rapunzel
- Zachary Levi – Eugene "Flynn Rider" Fitzherbert
- Donna Murphy – Mother Gothel
- Brad Garrett – Hook Hand Thug
- Ron Perlman – Stabbington brother
- Jeffrey Tambor – Big Nose Thug
- Richard Kiel – Vlad
- M. C. Gainey – Captain of the Guard
- Paul F. Tompkins – Short Thug

Non-speaking animal characters include Rapunzel's pet chameleon Pascal, and Maximus, the horse of the head of the palace guard. Other non-speaking roles include Rapunzel's parents (the Queen and King of Corona), the other Stabbington brother, and Ulf the Mime Thug.

== Production ==
=== Origins and conception ===
Walt Disney himself had first attempted to adapt the Brothers Grimm fairy tale Rapunzel into a feature-length animated film during the 1930s and 1940s, but Disney's efforts never fully materialized because the original story was considered too "small". The concept behind Tangled originated from The Walt Disney Company supervising animator Glen Keane in 1996. In 2001, Keane pitched the idea to then–Disney CEO Michael Eisner who approved it, but requested the film to be computer-animated. However, Keane was hesitant as he felt computer animation was not quite as fluid or organic as traditional animation was. In October 2003, the film was announced as Rapunzel Unbraided as a computer-animated feature scheduled for a 2007 release, which Keane described as "a Shrek-like version of the film". According to Ed Catmull, Eisner himself had proposed using modern-day San Francisco as the initial setting of the film. The story initially centered on two teenagers, Claire and Vince, who live in San Francisco and are transported into the fairy tale world, where they inhabit the bodies of Rapunzel and her prince Beau. Rapunzel and Beau themselves are turned into a squirrel and a dog. In July 2004, Reese Witherspoon and Kristin Chenoweth were in talks to portray roles, with the latter intended to voice Rapunzel. In October 2005, Dan Fogler was slated to provide a voice.

In reflection, Keane said of the original plot, "It was a fun, wonderful, witty version and we had a couple of great writers. But in my heart of hearts I believed there was something much more sincere and genuine to get out of the story, so we set it aside and went back to the roots of the original fairy tale." In November 2005, Unbraided was pushed back to a summer 2009 release in order to give Keane "more time to work on the story." In January 2006, the film was then shut down about a week before Catmull and John Lasseter were placed in charge of the studio, and one of their first decisions was to restart the project and ask Keane to keep going with the film. It had originally been announced in April 2007 that Annie-nominated animator and story artist Dean Wellins would be co-directing the film alongside Keane.

On October 9, 2008, it was reported that Keane and Wellins had stepped down as directors due to other commitments, and were replaced by the team of Byron Howard and Nathan Greno, director and storyboard director, respectively, of Disney's 2008 animated feature Bolt. Keane stayed on as an executive producer and animation supervisor, while Wellins moved on to direct Tick Tock Tale (2010). After the film's release, Keane revealed that he had "stepped back" from the role of director because of a heart attack in 2008.

=== Casting ===
The directors auditioned hundreds of young actresses to find Rapunzel's voice, among them were Idina Menzel and Kristen Bell, but both were rejected for not sounding right.

On September 10, 2009, it was announced that actress and singer-songwriter Mandy Moore, who previously collaborated with Disney on Disneytoon Studios' Brother Bear 2, had been cast as the voice of Rapunzel, and actor Zachary Levi would provide the voice of Flynn Rider. For the role of Flynn, the studio mandated exclusively only UK actors to audition for the part, as Rider was intended to be British. An American, Levi impersonated a British Received Pronunciation (RP) accent to audition, leading the producers to opt for him to use his natural American accent. Moore approached the project through auditioning, when she heard that a film about the story of Rapunzel was being made. Moore later expressed that she had dreamed to be a Disney princess since she was young and said that with the role of Rapunzel, she had fulfilled her "ultimate childhood dream". She described herself as a "girly fan" of Disney animated films like The Little Mermaid, Beauty and the Beast, Aladdin and The Lion King, and that it was an honor for her to be part of this "legacy"—the lineage of such Disney icons. Since the film was going to be a musical, it was required that all auditionees had to read several scenes and perform a song of their choice, to ensure that the voice actors could both act and sing. For this singing section, Moore chose "Help Me" by Joni Mitchell, a song that she herself had covered on her fourth studio album, Coverage (2003). Moore revealed that she had to attend several audition sessions and described the experiences as "pretty fun" but put little hope in receiving the part because she believed there would be much competition for this role; she just performed her best without any anxiety. When Disney informed her that she got the part, Moore described herself as being "over the moon": "I was working in New York at the time. I was with some friends and my husband—and I screamed as soon as I found out the news."

The film reportedly cost more than $260 million to produce.

=== Writing and character development ===
When asked about the character of Rapunzel, Mandy Moore said that Rapunzel was a relatable character and called her a "Renaissance, bohemian" woman rather than a typical Disney princess: Moore said "[Rapunzel] doesn't know she's a princess [until the end of the film]. She's just really sort of motivated to find out what else is out there beyond this crazy tower she's lived in for 18 years," and that "she's very independent, she can take care of herself, and she's definitely come up with really entertaining ways to keep herself busy." Moore also stated that she herself had little influence on Rapunzel: "The character was developed way before I had anything to do with it."

According to Greno, one of the most difficult problems during the development of the film's plot was for Rapunzel to leave the tower without immediately ending the movie, in that she had thereby escaped Mother Gothel and did not have any other specific objectives to pursue. At a meeting one day, animator John Ripa floated an idea which turned out to be the solution they had been looking for: the mysterious floating lanterns.

=== Recording ===
In Tangled, as with most animated films, all voice actors had to record their dialogue separately from one another to avoid bleeding into each other's tracks. Mandy Moore later recalled that during recording, she had never met Donna Murphy and only met Zachary Levi once when they recorded "I See the Light". Moore thought that this was "a good exercise in employing your imagination". When recording action scenes, the voice actors had to jog a little in place in order to make their voices sound realistic. For the songs, Moore and Levi recorded on a soundstage with a 65-piece orchestra under the supervision of composer Alan Menken. They sang live with the orchestra for several times in order to help everyone "get a vibe" and a feel for the music and the singing, then were asked to go in isolation booths to record the actual tracks. In order to aid animators in animating the characters, the filmmakers did interviews with the voice actors and filmed their facial expressions throughout the recording sessions. Disney animated films are usually animated to synchronize with recorded dialogue rather than asking the vocal talent to synchronize their delivery to animation after it is rendered. Moore found recording challenging, as she only had a few sketches rather than completed animation.

Due to scheduling conflicts with other projects (Moore had to travel to different places such as London or New York, and Levi could only record on weekends for five hours once every six weeks), they did not record dialogue in the same order as in the final film. "[When I came in], maybe that sequence or scene had been recorded by Mandy (Moore) already, maybe it hadn't. We'd end up doing the same scene five times, depending," Levi said. After watching the finished film, Moore was disappointed because she felt that her voice sounded "shrill", while Levi thought that his performance sounded "incredibly nasally".

=== Animation ===
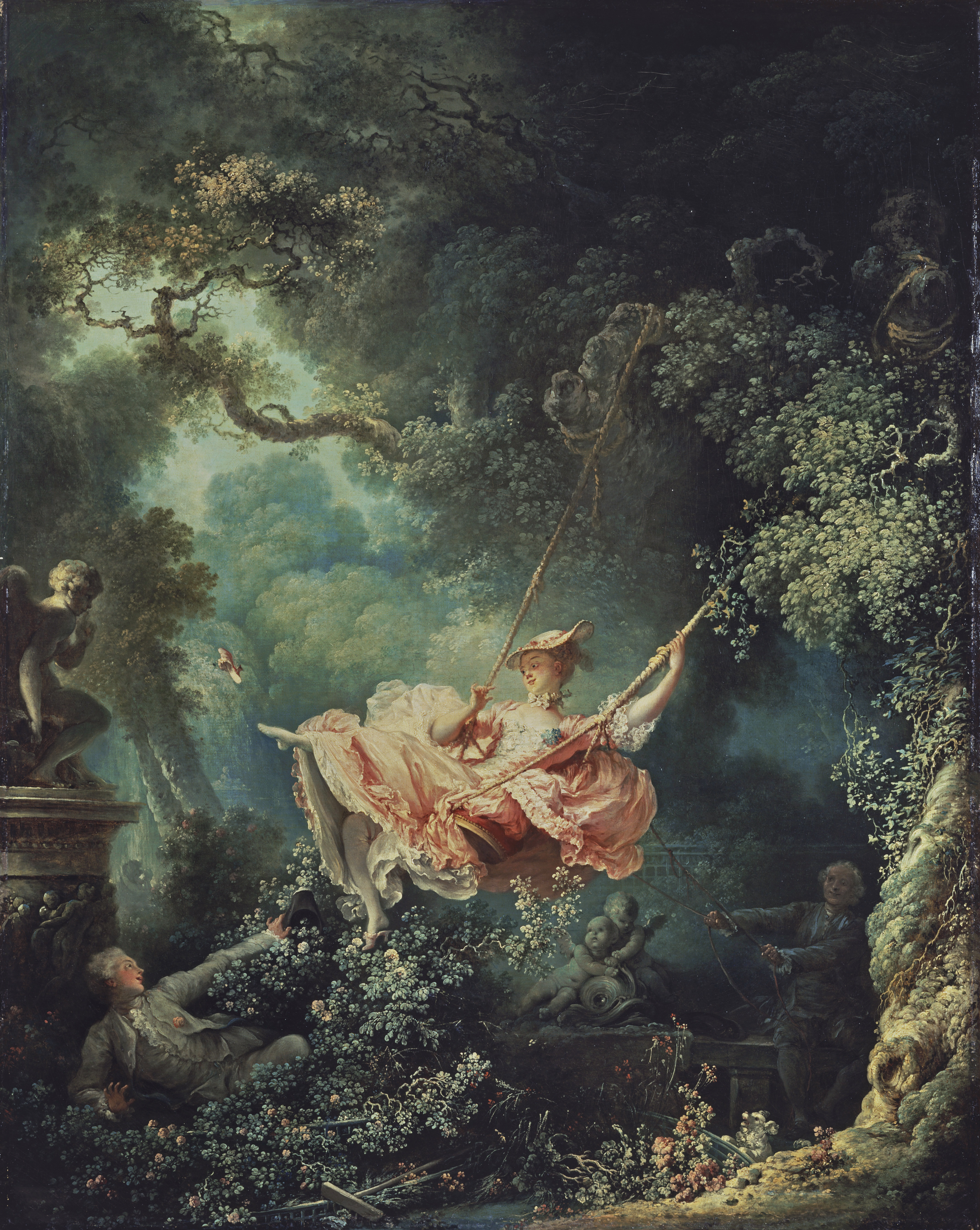
The Swing by Jean-Honoré Fragonard.

The film was made using computer-generated imagery (CGI), although Tangled was modeled on the traditional look of oil paintings on canvas. The Rococo paintings of French artist Jean-Honoré Fragonard, particularly The Swing, were used as references for the film's artistic style, a style described by Keane as "romantic and lush." To create the impression of a painting, non-photorealistic rendering was used.

A concept rendering of Rapunzel by Lisa Keene, demonstrating the "luscious golden hair" Keane wanted.

Glen Keane originally wanted the film to be animated using a traditional 2D animation process. However, Disney executives David Stainton and Dick Cook announced that they would only approve the film for production if it were created using the 3D computer graphics. In response to that demand, Glen Keane held a seminar called "The Best of Both Worlds", where he, with 50 Disney CGI artists and traditional artists, focused on the pros and cons of each style. After the meeting, it was decided that the film would be made in CGI animation, but in a way as to become an extension of the traditional 2D Disney "aesthetic", a term which referred to the naturalistic animation that conforms to the fundamental principles of animation as documented by Frank Thomas and Ollie Johnston in the book The Illusion of Life: Disney Animation.

Due to limitations in computer technology, especially regarding attempts to capture the complexity of a human form, many basic principles of animation used in traditionally animated movies had been absent from earlier CGI films; but technological advancements made it easier to blend the two, combining the strengths of each style. Keane stated repeatedly he was trying to make the computer "bend its knee to the artist" instead of having the computer dictate the artistic style and look of the film. By making the computer become as "pliable as the pencil", Keane's vision of a "three-dimensional drawing" seemed within reach, with the artist controlling the technology. Many of the techniques and tools that were required to give the film the quality Keane demanded did not exist when the project was started, and Walt Disney Animation Studios had to create them on their own. Keane said, "There's no photoreal hair. I want luscious hair, and we are inventing new ways of doing that. I want to bring the warmth and intuitive feel of hand-drawn to CGI."

One of the main goals of the animators was to create movement that mimicked the soft fluidity of the hand-drawn art found in older Disney animated films. Keane credited Disney 3D animator Kyle Strawitz with helping to combine CGI with the traditional hand-drawn style. "He took the house from Snow White and built it and painted it so it looked like a flat painting that suddenly started to move, and it had dimension and kept all of the soft, round curves of the brushstrokes of watercolor. Kyle helped us get that Fragonard look of that girl on the swing… We are using subsurface scattering and global illumination and all of the latest techniques to pull off convincing human characters and rich environments."

Rather than focusing on realism, the 3D team used an aesthetic approach. Robert Newman, the film's stereoscopic 3D supervisor, said that "We're using depth more artistically than ever before, and we're not as concerned with the literal transcription of depth between camera and projector as we are the interpretation of it." To do this, they used a new technique called multi-rigging, which is made up of multiple pairs of virtual cameras. Each pair is used individually on each separate element that adds depth to a scene, like background, foreground, and characters, without adjusting for the relation with the other pairs. When sandwiched together later in production, the result was something that would be visually impossible in the real world, but which created an appealing look to the film.

As a counterpart to the appealing and cute design of Rapunzel, the directors wanted to make Flynn Rider "the most handsome, most attractive male lead Disney has ever had." They held a large "Hot Man Meeting" where they gathered about 30 women from the studio and asked them what they considered attractive in a man. They brought in hundreds of images of their favourite male actors and celebrities, which were torn and pasted back again. After much deliberation, his look was eventually narrowed down to one concept drawing. For Mother Gothel, Howard stated that her visual design was inspired by Cher, citing the singer's "exotic and Gothic looking" appearance and adding that she "definitely was one of the people we looked at visually, as far as what gives you a striking character".

==== Technology development ====
Existing technology continued to present difficulties: in particular, animating hair turned out to be a challenge. Senior software engineer Kelly Ward spent six years writing programs to make it move the way they wanted. As late as January 2010, the directors were still not sure if the Rapunzel character's length of hair was going to work. These problems were finally solved in March: An improved version of a hair simulation program named Dynamic Wires, originally developed for Bolt, was eventually used. To make hair float believably in water, and to surmount other similar challenges, discrete differential geometry was used to produce the desired effects, freeing the animators from executing these specific tasks directly, which would have taken days instead of minutes.

==== Controversy over the film title change ====
Official logo of Rapunzel before the title was changed to Tangled

When first put into production, the film was promoted as having the title Rapunzel Unbraided, which was later changed to Rapunzel. Disney's previous animated feature, The Princess and the Frog (2009)—while being well received by various critics —was not as successful as Disney had hoped, and Catmull later admitted in writing that Disney Animation's faith that The Princess and the Frog's excellent quality would bring in all audiences notwithstanding the word "princess" in the title was their version of "a stupid pill". In order to market the new film to both sexes and additional age groups, Disney changed the title from Rapunzel to Tangled while also emphasizing Flynn Rider, the film's prominent male character, showing that his story is just as important as that of Rapunzel. Disney was criticized for altering the title as a marketing strategy. Floyd Norman, a former Disney and Pixar animator and story artist, said, "The idea of changing the title of a classic like Rapunzel to Tangled is beyond stupid. I'm convinced they'll gain nothing from this except the public seeing Disney as desperately trying to find an audience."

Justin Chang of Variety compared it to changing the title of The Little Mermaid to Beached. Writing for the San Francisco Chronicle's blog, Margot Magowan accused Disney of sexism, writing:

Can you imagine if Disney…switched a movie title so it wouldn't risk highlighting a male star? It's awful that this kind of radical gender discrimination exists for our smallest people—little kids who come into this world with huge imaginations and aspirations, big dreams that get squashed by a bunch of billionaire guys who run massive entertainment franchises.

On November 24, 2010, the day of the film's release, Greno and Howard disputed reports that the title change was a marketing decision. They said they changed the title from Rapunzel to Tangled because Rapunzel is not the only main character in the film. They went on to say that "you cannot call Toy Story "Buzz Lightyear," and they really needed a title that represented what the film is, and that it stars the duo of Rapunzel and Flynn Rider.

In March 2014, Lasseter explained that Disney had changed the name to improve the film's appeal to the four quadrants: "There was an audience perception that these movies were just for little girls but when boys, men, whatever actually see these movies they like them. So on Rapunzel … we changed the name and we called it Tangled. We did marketing that made the people who would not normally show up say, 'Hey, this looks pretty good.'"

== Music ==
The musical score and soundtrack album were composed by Alan Menken with lyrics written by Glenn Slater. It marked Menken's return to scoring for animated films, after recurringly doing so for several Disney Animation films until Home on the Range (2004). (Note: Though Menken had composed for the 2007 film Enchanted, it is a live-action-animation film, hence it cannot be considered as a full-fledged animation feature.) As several Pixar employees, being in charge for Disney, and the sensibilities being changed, Menken thought it as his biggest creative challenge and said that, he was "finding a way that we could wed musical-theater storytelling with the Pixar style of storytelling was primary". Menken said he attempted to blend medieval music with 1960s folk rock to create the new songs and the score and soundtrack were recorded at a span of two-and-a-half years.

Several songs were written, but eventually cut from the final film; "When Will My Life Begin?" replaced an earlier version called "What More Could I Ever Need?". Menken reported that that opening number went through five or six different versions. Elsewhere, Menken reported that there was originally a love song called "You Are My Forever" that Mother Gothel sang to Rapunzel in a motherly way, but was reprised later in the film by Flynn Rider in a romantic way. This idea was apparently replaced with the two songs "Mother Knows Best" and "I See the Light". The song "Something That I Want" written and performed by Grace Potter from Grace Potter and the Nocturnals is featured in the closing credits. The Latin American-Spanish version of the song, titled "Algo quiero querer", was recorded by Colombian pop-singer, Fanny Lú.

The soundtrack, released on Walt Disney Records on November 16, 2010, and peaked at number 44 on the Billboard 200, number 7 on the Soundtrack chart, and number 3 on the Kid Albums chart. Four years later, a double LP picture disc titled as Songs from Tangled was released on March 21, 2014.

== Release ==
=== Theatrical ===
Tangled premiered in Paris on November 17, exclusively screening at the Grand Rex theater two weeks in advance of its French wide release. With over 3,800 tickets sold on its opening day, it set a new record for films showing in a single theater. As part of Disney's 100th anniversary, Tangled was re-released in Helios theaters across Poland on October 21, 2023.

=== Home media ===
Tangled was released by Walt Disney Studios Home Entertainment as a four-disc combo pack on March 29, 2011. The combo pack includes a Blu-ray 3D, standard Blu-ray, DVD, and digital copy. A two-disc Blu-ray/DVD combo pack and single DVD are also available. Bonus features for the Blu-ray include deleted scenes, two alternate opening sequences, two extended songs, and an inside look at how the film was made. The DVD includes only the two Original Storybook Openings and the 50th Animated Feature Countdown.

Sales of Tangled in the US and Canada exceeded $95 million in DVD and Blu-ray sales, the highest-grossing DVD of the year 2011; its home video sales exceeded the film's earnings in its first week in theaters. The film sold a record 2,970,052 units (the equivalent of $44,521,079) in its first week in North America, the largest opening for a 2011 DVD. It dominated for two weeks on the DVD sales chart and sold 6,657,331 units ($102,154,692) as of July 18, 2012. It has also sold 2,518,522 Blu-ray units ($59,220,275) by May 29, 2011. As of January 20, 2016, the film has earned a total of $215 million in home video sales in the United States and Canada ($155 million from DVD sales and $60 million from Blu-ray sales). Tangled was released on Ultra HD Blu-ray on November 5, 2019.

== Reception ==
=== Box office ===
Tangled had a worldwide opening weekend of $86.1 million, and reached the summit of the worldwide box office once, on its eleventh weekend (Feb 4–6, 2011), with $24.9 million. The film earned $200.8 million in North America, and $391.6 million in other countries, for a worldwide total of $592.5 million; making it the third-highest-grossing animated film of 2010, behind Shrek Forever After and Toy Story 3, and the eighth-highest-grossing film of 2010. It was the third Disney film appearing in the Top 10 films of 2010. As of 2017, it was the sixth-highest-grossing film worldwide produced by Walt Disney Animation Studios, behind Frozen, Zootopia, The Lion King, Big Hero 6, and Moana.

Tangled earned $11.9 million on its opening Wednesday, breaking the record for the largest pre-Thanksgiving Wednesday opening, a record previously held by Disney·Pixar's Toy Story 2. In its first weekend of release, it earned $48.8 million (the highest opening for Walt Disney Animation Studios, surpassing The Lion King ($40.9 million), and later surpassed by both Wreck-It Ralph ($49 million) and Frozen ($67.4 million)), placing second for the period behind Harry Potter and the Deathly Hallows – Part 1, which earned $49.1 million. Tangled had the sixth-highest opening weekend for a film that did not debut at #1. Over the traditional Wednesday–Sunday Thanksgiving holiday period, it tallied $68.7 million, again finishing in second place. Tangled also marked the second-largest 3-day and 5-day Thanksgiving opening after Toy Story 2. During its second weekend (post-Thanksgiving), Tangled declined 56% to $21.6 million, although it jumped to first place at the box office. With a final gross of $200.8 million, it is the tenth-highest-grossing film of 2010, and the tenth 2010 film to pass the $200 million mark; it was the fourth-slowest film to pass this mark. Unadjusted for inflation, it is the ninth-highest-grossing film produced by Walt Disney Animation Studios, behind The Lion King ($422.8 million), Frozen ($400.7 million), Zootopia ($341.3 million), Moana ($248.7 million), Big Hero 6 ($221.3 million), Beauty and the Beast ($219 million), Aladdin ($217.4 million), and Ralph Breaks the Internet ($201.1 million).

On its opening weekend, it earned $17.4 million in eight territories and ranked second for the weekend behind Harry Potter and the Deathly Hallows – Part 1 ($117.3 million). It reached first place at the weekend box office outside North America three times in 2011. It marked the seventh-highest-grossing 2010 film and the third-highest-grossing 2010 animated film. In Russia and the CIS, it set an opening-weekend record among non-sequel animated films (first surpassed by Rio) and among Walt Disney Animation Studios films (surpassed by Frozen). Its highest-grossing markets outside North America was Germany ($44.2 million), where it is the highest-grossing 2010 animated film, followed by France and the Maghreb region ($39.4 million) and the UK, Ireland and Malta ($32.9 million).

=== Critical response ===
Tangled received largely positive reviews from critics upon release. Rotten Tomatoes gives the film an approval rating of 89% based on 226 reviews and an average score of 7.5/10. The website's critical consensus is: "While far from Disney's greatest film, Tangled is a visually stunning, thoroughly entertaining addition to the studio's classic animated canon." Metacritic, which assigns a weighted average score based on reviews from mainstream film critics, calculated a score of 71/100 based on 34 reviews, indicating "generally favorable reviews". Audiences polled by CinemaScore during the opening weekend, gave the film a rare "A+" grade on an A+ to F scale.

A. O. Scott of The New York Times positively reviewed the film as "the 50th animated feature from Disney, and its look and spirit convey a modified, updated but nonetheless sincere and unmistakable quality of old-fashioned Disneyness." Time film critic Richard Corliss wrote that Tangled "wades into the DreamWorks style of sitcom gags and anachronistic sass," while praising the film for achieving "the complex mix of romance, comedy, adventure and heart that defines the best Disney features." Corliss included Tangled at 19 in a list of top 25 All-time Best Animated films. Kenneth Turan from the Los Angeles Times awarded the film four stars out of five; he described the film as a "gorgeous computer-animated look that features rich landscapes and characters that look fuller and more lifelike than they have in the past." Sandie Angulo Chen of Common Sense Media gave the film five out of five stars, writing, "Fantastic princess adventure is fun, with great messages." Gael Cooper of NBC News expressed that Tangled may be the best Disney film of all time.

James Berardinelli commented on his review website ReelViews that the film is "entertaining and enjoyable, but not groundbreaking." He also stated Rapunzel is "not as memorable as Snow White, Ariel, or Belle" as well as stating "the songs are neither catchy nor memorable." Todd McCarthy, film reviewer for The Hollywood Reporter opened his review with, "It would have been nice if Disney's self-touted 50th animated feature were one of its best, a film that could stand with the studio's classics, but the world will have to make do with Tangled, a passably entertaining hodgepodge of old and new animation techniques, mixed sensibilities and hedged commercial calculations."

=== Accolades ===
The film has been nominated for a number of awards. Hollywood Foreign Press Association nominated Tangled for two Golden Globe Awards, for Best Animated Feature Film and Best Original Song for "I See the Light", but lost to Toy Story 3 and Burlesque, respectively. It also received an Oscar nomination for the Best Original Song, "I See the Light". The film also received two nominations for the Broadcast Film Critics Association in the same categories, though lost to Toy Story 3 and 127 Hours, as well as nominations for two Annie Awards, for Best Animated Feature Film and for Writing in a Feature Production.

Tangled was also nominated for two Phoenix Film Critics Society Awards, Best Animated Film and Best Original Song for "I've Got a Dream," which it lost to Toy Story 3 and Burlesque. "I See the Light" was nominated for Best Original Song at the 83rd Academy Awards. It has also been nominated for 37th Saturn Award for Best Animated Film.

Tangled won best 3D scene of the year at the second annual International 3D Society Creative Arts Awards.

Tangled was also nominated for favorite film in the British Academy Children Awards for Favourite Film, competing against films like Harry Potter and the Deathly Hallows – Parts 1 & 2, Transformers: Dark of the Moon, Cars 2, and Kung Fu Panda 2.

Group	Category	Result	Ref(s)
83rd Academy Awards	Best Original Song ("I See the Light")	Nominated	
38th Annie Awards	Best Animated Feature Film	Nominated	
38th Annie Awards	Writing in a Feature Production (Dan Fogelman)	Nominated	
British Academy Children's Awards (BAFTA)	Favourite Film	Nominated	
Broadcast Film Critics Association Awards 2010	Best Animated Feature Film	Nominated	
Broadcast Film Critics Association Awards 2010	Best Song ("I See the Light")	Nominated	
68th Golden Globe Awards	Best Animated Feature Film	Nominated	
68th Golden Globe Awards	Best Song ("I See the Light")	Nominated	
Golden Reel Awards	Best Sound Editing: Music in a Musical Feature Film	Nominated	
54th Grammy Awards	Best Compilation Soundtrack for Visual Media	Nominated	
54th Grammy Awards	Best Song Written For Visual Media ("I See the Light")	Won	
Las Vegas Film Critics Society	Best Song ("I See the Light")	Won	
National Movie Awards 2011	Animation	Won	
Phoenix Film Critics Society Awards	Best Animated Film	Nominated	
Phoenix Film Critics Society Awards	Best Original Song ("I've Got a Dream")	Nominated	
37th Saturn Awards	Best Animated Film	Nominated	
2011 Teen Choice Awards	Choice Animated Movie Voice (Zachary Levi)	Nominated	
9th Visual Effects Society Awards	Outstanding Animation in an Animated Feature Motion Picture (Clay Kaytis, John Kahrs, Glen Keane, Roy Conli)	Nominated	
9th Visual Effects Society Awards	Outstanding Animated Character in an Animated Feature Motion Picture (Tony Smeed, Amy Smeed, Becky Bresee, Kira Lehtomaki for "Rapunzel")	Nominated	

== Other media ==
=== Video games ===
A video game based on the film was released on November 23, 2010, for Nintendo DS, Wii, and PC platforms by Disney Interactive Studios.

A world based on the film, Kingdom of Corona, appears in Kingdom Hearts III, released on January 29, 2019, for PlayStation 4 and Xbox One. The story arc takes place during an alternate account of the events of the movie.

In the video game Disney Magic Kingdoms, Rapunzel, Flynn, Maximus, Mother Gothel, and Pascal are playable characters, while Rapunzel's Tower and Snuggly Duckling appear as attractions. The storyline of the characters in the game follows almost the same plot as in the film.

Mother Gothel, Rapunzel, Flynn Rider, and Maximus are also featured in Disney Dreamlight Valley.

=== Short film ===
Tangled Ever After is a short sequel released in 2012. The plot revolves around the wedding of Rapunzel and Eugene. Pascal and Maximus lose the wedding rings and chase after them, causing collateral damage along the way.

=== Manga ===
A manga adaptation of the film with illustrations by Shiori Kanaki was released to promote the film's Japanese release on March 25, 2011. It was later released in the United States on September 12, 2017.

=== Descendants franchise ===
In Descendants: School of Secrets, Rapunzel and Eugene have an unnamed daughter (portrayed by Teresa Decher) that appear as a recurring character. In the novel The Isle of the Lost, Mother Gothel appear as one of the villains imprisoned in the titular isle, working as a teacher in Dragon Hall, and has a daughter named Ginny. In Descendants: Wicked World, appears Rapunzel's daughter, Ruby, although only her hair is seen. In the novel Escape from the Isle of the Lost, Eugene appears as the representative of Corona in the National Association of Far Far Away. Originally, Rapunzel was going to appear in Descendants: The Rise of Red, as a teenager named Zellie (portrayed by Sam Morelos), however, Rapunzel was eventually deleted from the final film, causing Zellie to be rewritten as a cameo character named Meadow.

=== Stage adaptations ===
An abridged stage adaptation titled Tangled: The Musical premiered on board the Disney Magic of the Disney Cruise Line in November 2015, featuring three new songs written by Alan Menken and Glenn Slater.

In February 2024, it was reported that Disney Theatrical Group was developing a new stage adaptation of the film, with a workshop underway. In April 2026, the musical was reported to be moving forward, with Julia Mattison developing the book, Ashley Rodbro attached as director, and an Equity Principal Audition underway.

=== Television series ===
Tangled: Before Ever After, a television movie set between the feature film and the short film Tangled Ever After, aired on March 10, 2017, serving as an introduction to a continuing television series, Tangled: The Series, later renamed Rapunzel's Tangled Adventure, that started airing on Disney Channel on March 24, 2017. It ran for three seasons and sixty episodes until March 2020.

=== Cancelled sequel ===
In December 2014, Tangled's producer, Roy Conli, revealed that the production team had been "heavily pushed" for a feature-length sequel to the film, but when the writers and directors collaborated to develop one, they realized, "she cut her hair. It's over!" Conli explained that at Disney Animation under Lasseter, it is always the filmmakers who decide whether they are ready to make a sequel (not marketing or merchandising). In January 2015, Conli again provided a similar explanation when pressed on this point, and also mentioned that directors Greno and Howard ultimately "weren't really interested" in continuing the story.

== Upcoming 2028 live-action remake ==
A live-action adaptation of Tangled is currently filming, directed by Michael Gracey and written by Jennifer Kaityn Robinson and Michael Montemayor, and starring Teagan Croft as Rapunzel, Milo Manheim as Flynn Rider, Kathryn Hahn as Mother Gothel, and Diego Luna, with filming done in Spain, specifically in Burgos Alicante in the cities of Catalonia; Girona, and Tarragona, and Álava, Basque Country. It is scheduled to be released in March 2028.
