= Roles of mothers in Disney media =

Overview of mother figures in Disney

The heroes and heroines of most Disney films come from unstable family backgrounds; most are either orphaned or have no mothers. Few, if any, have only single-parent mothers. In other instances, mothers are presented as "bad surrogates," eventually "punished for their misdeeds." There is much debate about the reasoning behind this phenomenon.

A prevalent urban legend explains the phenomenon resulted from the death of Flora Disney, mother of Walt and Roy Disney, who died in 1938 due to a gas leak in the house the two brothers had recently purchased for her. This, however, is demonstrably false. The so-called phenomenon had been present in Disney canon from before Flora's 1938 death, with the presence of the Evil Queen in Snow White and the Seven Dwarfs, which released in 1937. Further, the prevalence of absent mothers, or even evil step-mothers, were not creative choices made by the Disney brothers themselves, but were plot points present in the source material that were adapted into later animated films, such as the original Cinderella tale, the 1923 novel Bambi, a Life in the Woods, and Helen Aberson-Mayer's Dumbo the Flying Elephant.

Some feminists (such as Amy Richards) believe it is to create dramatic interest in the main characters; if mothers were present to guide them, they argue, there would not be much of a plot. Some entertainment journalists (such as G. Shearer) believe that it is to show that a happy family does not have to consist of a mother, father and a child and that a family can be one parent and one child, or one parent and many siblings. Below is a list of some notable examples of this aspect of Disney films and television series.

== Categories of mothers ==
=== No (or 'absent') mother ===
- Snow White and the Seven Dwarfs: Snow White – biological mother not mentioned; The Prince – no parents present.
- Pinocchio: Pinocchio – no mother, had a father Geppetto.
- Cinderella: Cinderella – biological mother not mentioned; Prince Charming – no mother (she was mentioned in the third film).
- Alice in Wonderland: Alice and her sister – parents not shown.
- Peter Pan franchise: Peter Pan – no mother; The Lost Boys – no mothers; Jake, Izzy, and Cubby – no mothers.
- Old Yeller: Young Yeller – his mother, Miss Prissy, is not shown, though he had a deceased father Old Yeller.
- Sleeping Beauty: Prince Phillip – no mother.
- The Sword in the Stone: Arthur Pendragon/"Wart" – no parents (his father is revealed to have died); Sir Kay – no mother.
- The Jungle Book: Mowgli – no human parents; Baloo – mother was mentioned.
- Witch Mountain franchise: Tony and Tia Malone – no parents.
- The Rescuers: Penny – no parents, but gets adoptive parents by the end.
- The Fox and the Hound: Copper – no mother.
- Tron franchise: Sam Flynn – no mother. No father for the majority of his life as well.
- The Black Cauldron: Taran – no parents; Princess Eilonwy – no parents, assumed dead.
- The Great Mouse Detective: Olivia Flaversham – no mother.
- DuckTales: Webby Vanderquack – no parents.
- Oliver & Company: Oliver – no mother; Jenny Foxworth – her mother is mentioned to arrive in time for her birthday, but is not shown.
- The Little Mermaid: Prince Eric – no parents present, assumed dead.
- TaleSpin: Kit Cloudkicker – no parents, assumed dead.
- Darkwing Duck: Gosalyn Mallard – no parents, but gets adopted by Drake.
- Beauty and the Beast: Belle – no mother; Beast – no parents present, assumed dead.
- Aladdin: Jasmine – no mother; a mother character was originally written for Aladdin's character, but was ultimately cut so he has no parents, although he finds his father Cassim in Aladdin and the King of Thieves.
- Goof Troop/A Goofy Movie/An Extremely Goofy Movie: Max Goof – no mother.
- Mulan: Li Shang – no mother.
- Tarzan: Jane Porter – no mother.
- The Emperor's New Groove: Kuzco – no parents present, assumed dead (since "Emperor" is a hereditary role); Kronk – no mother.
- Monsters, Inc.: Boo – parents not shown.
- The Hunchback of Notre Dame II: Madellaine – no parents, assumed dead.
- Pirates of the Caribbean (film series): Elizabeth Swann, Jack Sparrow – mother referenced as dead (Elizabeth's mother is noted by her father's ghost, but never seen), Will Turner – mother mentioned having died, father is "Bootstrap" Bill Turner.
- Brother Bear/Brother Bear 2: Kenai, Sitka, and Denahi – no parents present, assumed dead; Nita – no mother.
- Super Robot Monkey Team Hyperforce Go!: Chiro – no parents.
- Pucca: Pucca – no parents.
- Ratatouille: Remy and Emile – no mother, had a father Django. Alfredo Linguini – mother was not shown on screen and is mentioned to have died. His father was the late master chef Auguste Gusteau.
- Phineas and Ferb: Ferb Fletcher – biological mother not mentioned, had a father Lawrence.
- Enchanted: Giselle – no parents; Prince Edward – biological mother not mentioned; Morgan Philip – biological mother mentioned having left the family.
- The Princess and the Frog: Charlotte La Bouff – no mother.
- Tinker Bell and the Great Fairy Rescue: Elizabeth Griffiths – no mother.
- Gravity Falls: Dipper and Mabel Pines – parents not shown.
- Wreck-It Ralph: Ralph – mother was mentioned.
- Frozen: Kristoff – no parents.
- Raya and the Last Dragon: Raya – no mother.
- Luca: Alberto Scorfano – no mother (his father abandoned him); Giulia Marcovaldo – her mother Maria, only shown in the end credits.
- Elemental: Clod – parents not shown.
- Wish: Valentino – no mother (mentioned only).

=== Stepmothers and mother figures ===
- Snow White and the Seven Dwarfs: Queen Grimhilde, Snow White's stepmother.
- Pinocchio: The Blue Fairy, mother figure to Pinocchio.
- Cinderella: Lady Tremaine, Cinderella's stepmother.
- Oliver & Company: Rita, mother figure to Oliver.
- The Santa Clause franchise: Carol Newman-Calvin, mother figure to Charlie.
- Phineas and Ferb: Linda Flynn-Fletcher, mother figure to Ferb.
- Enchanted: Queen Narissa, mother figure to Edward.
- Sofia the First: Queen Miranda, mother figure to Amber and James.
- Big Hero 6: Aunt Cass, Hiro and Tadashi's aunt.
- Disenchanted: Giselle Philip, mother figure to Morgan.
- Kiff: Mrs. Racona (fox), Reggie's stepmother.

=== Mother killed, died, or captured ===
- Dumbo: Dumbo – his mother Mrs. Jumbo, is locked up for the majority of the film, but is not killed.
- Bambi: Bambi – mother killed by a hunter.
- The Fox and the Hound: Tod – mother killed by a gunshot.
- Pocahontas: Pocahontas – no mother (mentioned only; revealed to have been dead for years).
- The Hunchback of Notre Dame: Quasimodo – mother killed by Frollo.
- The Lion King II: Simba's Pride: Kovu, Nuka, and Vitani – their mother Zira fell to her death in the river and Nuka was crushed to death by a falling log.
- Tarzan: Tarzan – mother (and as well as father) killed by Sabor.
- Dinosaur: Aladar – his mother, along with 11 other siblings, was killed by a Carnotaurus.
- The Little Mermaid II: Return to the Sea: Ursula and Morgana – mother dead prior to the events of the film.
- Atlantis: The Lost Empire: Kida Nedakh – her mother was killed while trying to save Atlantis from its first fate. Father dies of internal bleeding in the film.
- Lilo & Stitch franchise:
  - Main continuity (2002–2006): Lilo and Nani Pelekai – parents dead prior to the events of the first film; Lilo implies they died in a car crash in rainy weather. Additionally, the Lilo & Stitch: The Series episode "Remmy" focuses on the anniversary of their parents' death, with Lilo having a dream of her and Nani being with their parents near the end of the episode (the only time they are "seen" alive).
  - Stitch!: Yuna Kamihara – mother dead prior to the events of the series, having died in a typhoon when Yuna was a baby. The second season (The Mischievous Alien's Great Adventure) episode "A Recurring Nightmare" focuses on Yuna's vague memories of her mother.
  - Stitch & Ai: Wang Ai Ling and Jiejie – parents died a year prior to the beginning of the series' events. The Wang sisters' aunt, Daiyu, tries to take over as Ai's caretaker in the series to their resistance. Ai briefly reunites with her parents' spirits in "Dream On".
  - Lilo & Stitch (2025): Lilo and Nani Pelekai – parents dead prior to the events of the film as with the animated original; unlike the original, the cause of death is not specified.
- Finding Nemo: Nemo – his mother Coral, along with all other 400+ siblings, was killed by a giant barracuda.
- Brother Bear: Koda – his mother was killed by Kenai and Sitka fell to his death in the ice.
- Chicken Little: Chicken Little – mother dead for unknown reasons.
- The Little Mermaid: Ariel's Beginning: Ariel, Aquata, Andrina, Arista, Attina, Adella, and Alana – their mother Queen Athena, killed by pirates.
- Tangled franchise: Flynn Rider – mother killed when he was very young. Cassandra – Mother Gothel withered away from old age. Pascal - mother killed by a snake.
- Sofia the First: Amber and James – their mother Queen Lorelei, dead for unknown reasons.
- Frozen: Anna and Elsa – their mother Queen Iduna (as well as father King Agnarr), killed in a shipwreck.
- Maleficent: Aurora – her mother Queen Leila, died halfway in the film (offscreen).
- Big Hero 6: Hiro Hamada – mother (as well as father) died when he was 3 years old and his brother Tadashi was killed in a fire.
- Cinderella (2015): Cinderella – mother died early in the film.
- Elena of Avalor: Elena and Isabel – their mother Queen Lucia (as well as father King Raul), killed by Shuriki; Chancellor Esteban – mother (as well as father) killed in a shipwreck.
- Moana: Chief Tui – his mother Tala, died and manifested in the form of a manta ray.
- Beauty and the Beast (2017): Belle – mother died from the plague; Beast – mother died prior to the events of the film.
- Coco: Elena Rivera – her mother Coco, died after the events of the film.
- Aladdin (2019): Aladdin – mother (as well as father) died when he was young; Jasmine – mother killed prior to the events of the film.
- Amphibia: Sprig and Polly Plantar – mother eaten by a heron when they were young.
- Cruella: Estella/Cruella - her adoptive mother Catherine, was killed by the Suffolk coast's Dalmatian dogs.
- The Little Mermaid (2023): Ariel, Mala, Indira, Caspia, Tamika, Karina, and Perla – mother killed prior to the events of the film; Prince Eric – mother (as well as father) killed in a shipwreck.
- Elemental: Cinder Lumen – mother died of old age; Lutz – no mother (mentioned by Wade to have died).
- Snow White: Snow White – mother died early in the film.
- Elio (2025): Elio Solis – mother (as well as father) died.

=== Present mothers ===
==== Biological mothers ====
- Dumbo: Mrs. Jumbo, Dumbo (Jumbo Jr.)'s mother – single.
- Bambi/Bambi II: Faline – mother of twins Geno and Gurri; Mrs. Hare – mother of Thumper and his sisters; Flower's mother (name not mentioned).
- Cinderella: Lady Tremaine – mother of Drizella and Anastasia.
- Peter Pan franchise: Mary Darling – mother of Wendy, John, and Michael; Wendy Darling – mother of Jane and Danny; Mama Hook, Captain Hook's mother.
- Lady and the Tramp/Lady and the Tramp II: Scamp's Adventure: Lady – mother of Scamp and triplets Annette, Collette, and Danielle; Jane Brown, James Brown Junior's mother.
- Sleeping Beauty: Queen Leah, Aurora's mother.
- One Hundred and One Dalmatians: Perdita – only to the original litter of 15 puppies.
- The Parent Trap franchise: Margaret McKendrick – mother of twins Sharon and Susan; Elizabeth James – mother of twins Hallie and Annie.
- Winnie the Pooh franchise: Kanga, Roo's mother; Christopher Robin's mother (name not mentioned); Mama Heffalump, Lumpy's mother.
- The Ugly Dachshund: Danke, mother of Wilhelmina, Heidi, and Chloe; Duchess, Brutus' mother.
- The Jungle Book franchise: Winifred, Haithi Jr.'s mother; Messua, Ranjan's mother; Shanti's mother (name not mentioned).
- The Aristocats: Duchess – mother of Toulouse, Marie, and Berlioz.
- Robin Hood: Mother Rabbit - single mother of Skippy, Sis, Tagalong Rabbit and the other unnamed rabbit siblings.
- Freaky Friday franchise: Ellen Andrews – mother of Annabel and Ben; Tess Coleman – mother of Anna and Harry; Katherine Blake – mother of Ellie and Fletcher.
- The Brave Little Toaster/The Brave Little Toaster Goes to Mars: Rob McGroarty's mother (only her voice is heard); Chris McGroarty, Robbie's mother.
- Honey, I Shrunk the Kids franchise: Diane Szalinski – mother of Amy, Nick, and Adam.
- DuckTales: M'Ma Crackshell, Fenton's mother; Ma Beagle – mother of the Beagle Boys.
- TaleSpin: Rebecca Cunningham, Molly's mother.
- The Rescuers Down Under: Cody's mother (name not mentioned) – single.
- Darkwing Duck: Binkie Muddlefoot – mother of Honker and Tank.
- Beauty and the Beast: Mrs. Potts – single mother of 12 children, including Chip.
- Goof Troop: Peg Pete – mother of P.J. and Pistol.
- The Lion King franchise: Sarabi, Simba's mother; Sarafina, Nala's mother; Nala – mother of Kiara and Kion; Ma, Timon's mother.
- Gargoyles: Demona, Angela's mother; Diane Maza – mother of Elisa, Derek, and Beth.
- The Santa Clause franchise: Laura Miller – mother of Charlie and Lucy; Carol Newman-Calvin, Buddy's mother.
- Toy Story franchise: Andy and Molly's mother – single; Sid and Hannah's mother (only her voice is heard); Bonnie's mother.
- Hercules: Hera, Hercules' mother.
- Recess: Ellie Detweiler – mother of T.J. and Becky; Flo Spinelli – mother of (Ashley) Spinelli, Vito, and Joey; Vince and Chad's mother; Mikey's mother; Doris Grundler, Gretchen's mother; Madge Griswald, Gus's mother.
- Pepper Ann: Lydia Pearson – single mother of Pepper Ann and Moose.
- PB&J Otter: Opal Otter – mother of Peanut, Jelly, and Baby Butter; Wanda Raccoon – mother of Pinch and Scootch; Betty-Lou Beaver, Munchy’s mother; Shirley Duck, Flick’s mother; Georgina Snootie – mother of Ootsie and Bootsie.
- Mulan: Fa Li, Mulan's mother; Grandmother Fa, Fa Zhou's mother and Mulan's paternal grandmother.
- Rolie Polie Olie: Mrs. Polina Polie – mother of Olie and Zowie; Bonita 'Chiquita' Bevel – mother of Billy and Binky.
- The Weekenders: Tino's mother; Lor and his brothers' mother; Carver, Penny, and Todd's mother; Tish's mother.
- Dinosaur: Plio, Suri's mother.
- The Little Mermaid II: Return to the Sea: Ariel, Melody's mother.
- The Emperor's New Groove: Chicha – mother of Chaca, Tipo, and Yupi.
- Lloyd in Space: Nora Lee Nebulon – single mother of Lloyd and Francine.
- The Proud Family: Trudy Proud – mother of Penny and twins BeBe and CeCe; Sugar Mama Proud, Penny's paternal grandmother and the mother of Oscar and Bobby.
- Monsters, Inc. franchise: Mike Wazowski's mother (only shown in the outtakes); Sheri Squibbles, Squishy's mother; Millie Tuskmon, Tylor's mother; Duncan's mother (name not mentioned).
- The Hunchback of Notre Dame II: Esmeralda, Zephyr's mother.
- Kingdom Hearts: Sora's mother (only her voice is heard).
- Kim Possible: Dr. Ann Possible – mother of Kim and twins Jim and Tim; Ron's mother (name not mentioned).
- Treasure Planet: Sarah Hawkins, Jim Hawkins's mother (his father left the family).
- Lilo & Stitch franchise:
  - Lilo & Stitch: The Series: Mertle Edmonds's mother (name not mentioned) – single, had separated from her husband (named "Karl" in Lilo & Stitch 2: Stitch Has a Glitch) prior to the events of the show; Wendy Pleakley's mother (name not mentioned) – seen without her husband in The Series but seen with and remains married to him in Stitch!.
  - Lilo & Stitch (2025): Mertle Edmonds's mother (name not mentioned) – is still married to her unnamed husband in this film.
- The Incredibles franchise: Helen Parr/Elastigirl – mother of Violet, Dash, and Jack-Jack.
- American Dragon: Jake Long: Susan Shi Long – mother of Jake and Haley.
- The Buzz on Maggie: Frieda Pesky – mother of Maggie, Aldrin, Pupert, and Bella.
- Meet the Robinsons: Lewis' mother (name not mentioned) – single; Franny Robinson, Wilbur's mother; Petunia Robinson – mother of Laszlo and Tallulah.
- Phineas and Ferb: Linda Flynn-Fletcher – mother of Phineas and Candace; Vivian Garcia-Shapiro, Isabella's mother; Ballet's mother; Biffany Van Stomm, Buford's mother; Jeremy and Suzy's mother; Stacy and Ginger's mother; Charlene Doofenshmirtz, Vanessa's mother; Heinz and Roger's mother.
- Bolt: Penny's mother (name not mentioned) – single.
- Up: Russell's mother (name not mentioned) – single.
- The Princess and the Frog: Eudora, Tiana's mother (her father James was killed in the war); Queen of Maldonia – mother of Prince Naveen and Prince Ralphie.
- Alice in Wonderland (2010): Helen Kingsleigh – mother of Alice and Margaret.
- Tangled franchise: Queen Arianna, Rapunzel's mother.
- Gravity Falls: Priscilla Northwest, Pacifica's mother; Janice Valentino, Robbie's mother.
- Brave: Queen Elinor – mother of Merida and triplets Harris, Hubert, and Hamish.
- Sofia the First: Queen Miranda, Sofia's mother; Helen Hanshaw, Ruby's mother; Winifred the Wise – mother of Cedric and Cordelia; Queen Emmaline – mother of Oona and Cora.
- Star vs. the Forces of Evil: Moon Butterfly, Star's mother; Angie Diaz, Marco's mother.
- Inside Out franchise: Jill Andersen, Riley's mother.
- Descendants franchise: Maleficent, Mal's mother; Queen Grimhilde, Evie's mother; Cruella de Vil, Carlos' mother; Belle, Ben's mother; The Fairy Godmother, Jane's mother; Aurora, Audrey's mother; Cinderella, Chad's mother; Fa Mulan, Lonnie's mother; Ursula, Uma's mother (only her voice is heard).
- The Good Dinosaur: Momma Ida – mother of Arlo and twins Buck and Libby.
- Zootopia: Bonnie Hopps – mother of 276 children, including Judy; Nick's mother (only shown in flashback).
- Finding Dory: Jenny, Dory's mother.
- Elena of Avalor: Captain Scarlett Turner, Naomi's mother; Rafa, Mateo's mother; Blanca Núñez, Gabe's mother.
- Milo Murphy's Law: Brigette Murphy – mother of Milo and Sara.
- Moana franchise: Sina – mother of Moana and Simea.
- DuckTales (2017–21): Della Duck – mother of triplets Huey, Dewey, and Louie; Downy McDuck – mother of Scrooge. Hortense, and Matilda; Officer Cabrera, Fenton's mother.
- Coco: Mamá Imelda, Coco's mother and Miguel's late paternal great-great-grandmother; Elena Rivera, Miguel's paternal grandmother and the mother of Berto, Carmen, and Enrique; Luisa Rivera – mother of Miguel and Socorro; Gloria Rivera – mother of Abel, Rosa, and twins Benny and Manny.
- Big City Greens: Nancy Green – mother of Cricket and Tilly; Alice Green, Bill's mother.
- Amphibia: Anne Boonchuy's mother (name not mentioned).
- The Owl House: Camila Noceda, Luz's mother.
- Onward: Laurel Lightfoot – mother of Ian and Barley.
- Soul: Libba Gardner, Joe's mother.
- Raya and the Last Dragon: Virana, Namaari's mother.
- Cruella: The Baroness, Estella/Cruella's mother.
- Luca: Daniela Paguro, Luca's mother; Grandma Paguro, Daniela's mother and Luca's maternal grandmother.
- The Ghost and Molly McGee: Sharon McGee, Molly's mother.
- Encanto: Julieta Madrigal – mother of Mirabel, Isabela, and Luisa; Pepa Madrigal – mother of Dolores, Camilo, and Antonio; Alma Madrigal, Mirabel's maternal grandmother and the mother of triplets Julieta, Pepa, and Bruno.
- Turning Red: Ming Lee, Mei's mother; Ping, Lily's mother; Grandma Wu, Mei's maternal grandmother and the mother of Ming, Ping, and Chen.
- Chip 'n Dale: Rescue Rangers (film): Chip's mother (name not mentioned, only shown in flashback).
- Disenchanted: Giselle Philip, Sofia's mother; Malvina Monroe, Tyson's mother.
- Strange World: Meridian Clade, Ethan's mother; Penelope Clade, Searcher's mother and Ethan's paternal grandmother.
- Elemental: Cinder Lumen, Ember's mother; Brook Ripple – mother of Wade, Alan, and Lake; Eddy Ripple – mother of Marco and Polo.
- Kiff: Beryl Chatterley, Kiff's mother; Mary Buns – mother of Barry, Harry, Terri, and Kristophe; Mrs. Fox, Candle's mother; Mrs. Angstrom, Trevor's mother; Mrs. Racona (raccoon), Reggie's mother.
- Hailey's On It!: Patricia Banks – mother of Hailey, Dwayne, and Johnson; Sunny Denoga – mother of Scott and Becker.
- Wish: Sakina, Asha's mother.
- Primos: Bibi Ramirez Humphrey – mother of Tater, Nellie, and Bud.

==== Adoptive mothers and legal guardians ====
- One Hundred and One Dalmatians: Perdita - only to the other 84 puppies.
- The Jungle Book franchise: Raksha, Mowgli's adoptive wolf mother (formerly); Messua, Mowgli's adoptive human mother.
- The Rescuers: Penny's adoptive mother.
- Rolie Polie Olie: Mrs. Polina Polie, Coochie and Coo's adoptive mother.
- Hercules: Alcmene, Hercules' adoptive mother.
- Tarzan: Kala, Tarzan's adoptive mother.
- Dinosaur: Plio, Aladar's adoptive mother.
- Lilo & Stitch franchise:
  - Main continuity (2002–2006): Nani Pelekai, Lilo's older sister and legal guardian.
  - Lilo & Stitch (2025): Tūtū, David Kawena's grandmother and the Pelekais' neighbor, becomes Lilo's foster mother at the end of the film after Nani relinquishes legal custody.
- Bambi II: Mena, Bambi's adoptive mother (formerly).
- The Replacements: Karen "Agent K" Daring, adoptive mother of Todd and Riley.
- Meet the Robinsons: Lucille Robinson, Lewis' adoptive mother.
- Tangled: Mother Gothel, an example of an evil adoptive mother.
- Frozen: Bulda, Kristoff's adoptive mother.
- Big Hero 6: Aunt Cass, Hiro and Tadashi's aunt and legal guardian.
- Cruella: Catherine, Estella/Cruella's late adoptive mother.
- The Little Mermaid (2023): Queen Selina, Prince Eric's adoptive mother.
- Elio, (2025): Olga Solis, Elio's aunt and legal guardian

== See also ==
- List of Disney television series
- List of Disney Channel series
- List of Walt Disney Pictures films
- List of Disney television films
- List of Disney Channel Original Movies
- Parental portrayals in the media
