= Dumbo =

1941 American animated film produced by Walt Disney

- Original theatrical release poster
- Directed by: Supervising director: Ben Sharpsteen; Sequence directors: Norman Ferguson; Wilfred Jackson; Bill Roberts; Jack Kinney; Samuel Armstrong
- Story by: Joe Grant; Dick Huemer
- Based on: Dumbo, the Flying Elephant by Helen Aberson; Harold Pearl
- Produced by: Walt Disney
- Music by: Frank Churchill; Oliver Wallace
- Production company: Walt Disney Productions
- Distributed by: RKO Radio Pictures
- Release dates: October 23, 1941 (New York City); October 31, 1941 (United States)
- Running time: 64 minutes
- Country: United States
- Language: English
- Budget: $950,000
- Box office: >$1.3 million (est. United States/Canada rentals, 1941)

Dumbo is a 1941 American animated musical fantasy film produced by Walt Disney Productions and released by RKO Radio Pictures. It is based upon the storyline written by Helen Aberson and Harold Pearl, and illustrated by Helen Durney for the prototype of a novelty toy ("Roll-a-Book").

The main character is Jumbo Jr., an elephant who is ridiculed for his oversized ears and mockingly nicknamed "Dumbo", but in fact he is capable of flying by using his ears as wings. Throughout most of the film, his only true friend, aside from his mother, is a mouse named Timothy – a relationship parodying the stereotypical animosity between mice and elephants.

Produced to recoup the financial losses of both Pinocchio and Fantasia, Dumbo was a deliberate pursuit of simplicity and economy. At 64 minutes, it is one of the studio's shortest animated features. Sound was recorded conventionally using the RCA System. One voice was synthesized using the Sonovox system, but it too was recorded using the RCA System.

Dumbo was released on October 23, 1941, where it was met with critical acclaim for its story, humor, visuals, and music. The film was later criticized for stereotyping of black people. Its accolades include an Academy Award for Best Scoring of a Musical Picture. In 2017, this film was selected for preservation in the United States National Film Registry by the Library of Congress as being "culturally, historically and aesthetically significant".

In the years following its initial release, Dumbo has remained popular, spawning a popular theme park attraction, merchandise products, a television series, and a live-action adaptation.

== Plot ==
In Florida, while a large circus spends the off-season in its winter grounds, a flock of white storks delivers many babies to the animals. One elephant, Mrs. Jumbo, does not receive her baby, and keeps scanning the sky in hope. The next spring, the circus loads up its train, Casey Jr., and sets out on a new tour. A belated stork catches up with the train and drops off the expected baby elephant, Jumbo Jr. The other elephants are initially delighted, until the baby sneezes and reveals far-oversized ears; they then mockingly nickname him "Dumbo". Mrs. Jumbo shows her baby great care and love, defending him from the others' abuse.

Being clumsy due to his ears, Dumbo is made into a sideshow attraction. When some rowdy boys start to bully Dumbo, even breaking into his pen to tug on his ears, a furious Mrs. Jumbo spanks their leader and starts throwing hay bales at other spectators. The ringmaster and his staff separate Mrs. Jumbo and her baby, causing her to douse the Ringmaster in a water vat and attack the other men. She is eventually restrained in a locked train car as a mad elephant; the other elephants blame the incident on Dumbo being a "freak", and continue to shun him.

Timothy, a mouse that travels with the circus, decides to intervene in the situation; scaring off the adult elephants, he befriends Dumbo and decides to make him a star. He whispers in the ringmaster's ear while the latter sleeps, convincing him to try a new stunt with Dumbo as the top of a pyramid of elephants. Dumbo trips on his ears during the show and knocks over the pyramid, injuring the others and causing the big top to collapse. Dumbo is demoted to being a part of the clowns' fireman act, in which he has to dress as a baby and jump from a burning platform into a vat of pie filling. The other elephants disown Dumbo as an elephant for disgracing himself in this way; despite his newfound popularity with the clowns, Dumbo becomes depressed.

Timothy decides to take Dumbo to see Mrs. Jumbo, but they cannot see each other's faces and can only intertwine trunks. Meanwhile, the clowns decide to increase the popularity of their fireman act by dangerously raising the platform Dumbo jumps from. In celebration of the plan, they drink champagne, and a bottle of it falls into a water vat. Crying after visiting his mother, Dumbo has an unsettling case of the hiccups, so Timothy takes him to the vat for some water, only to discover too late that the water contains champagne. Both of them get drunk, and hallucinate pink elephants.

Dumbo and Timothy are awakened the next morning by Jim and his gang of crows, who discover them sleeping high up in their tree. Initially making fun of Timothy's assertion that Dumbo must have flown into the tree with his ears while being drunk, the crows are soon moved by Dumbo's sad story. They decide to help Timothy, giving him a "magic feather" to help Dumbo fly. Holding the feather, Dumbo does indeed take off a second time. He and Timothy return to the circus with plans to surprise the audience.

During the clowns' fire act, Dumbo jumps off the platform and prepares to fly. He drops the feather, but Timothy assures him it was only a psychological aid. As Dumbo successfully flies about the big top, he uses his trunk and various props to humiliate the clowns, Ringmaster, and other elephants; the audience applauds, believing this to be part of the act. Dumbo gains fame and fortune, Timothy becomes his new manager and signs him to a Hollywood contract, and Mrs. Jumbo is freed. She and Dumbo are given a private coach on Casey Jr., and the crows wave goodbye to the duo as they travel away.

== Voice cast ==
The voice actors are uncredited for their roles in the film.

- The title character is Dumbo, whose real name is Jumbo Jr. He is a newborn elephant who has huge ears and is able to use them to fly, carrying what he thinks of as a magic feather. Dumbo is speechless in this film.
- Edward Brophy as Timothy Q. Mouse, an anthropomorphic mouse who becomes the only friend of Dumbo after his mother is locked up and does his best to make Dumbo happy again. He is never referred to by name save for a mention in a newspaper article near the end of the film.
- Verna Felton as
  - Elephant Matriarch, the well-meaning but pompous leader of the elephants who is cold toward Dumbo.
  - Mrs. Jumbo, Dumbo's mother, who not only speaks just once in the film to give Dumbo's name, but also sings her lullaby "Baby Mine" to him.
- Cliff Edwards as Dandy Crow (previously named Jim Crow on the original model sheets), the leader of a group of anthropomorphic crows. Though he initially jokes and ridicules Timothy's idea that Dumbo can fly, he hears Dumbo's tragic history and becomes determined to help Dumbo fly for real. He is never mentioned by name in the film.
- Herman Bing as the ringmaster, who is the strict, and foolish owner of the circus. Due to being misinformed about Mrs. Jumbo's attack on the rowdy boys, he assumes she simply snapped and locks her up.
- Sterling Holloway as Mr. Stork, Dumbo's carrier stork seen at the beginning of the film.
- Margaret Wright as Casey Junior, an anthropomorphic 2-4-0 tender locomotive hauling the circus train.
- The Hall Johnson Choir as Crow Chorus
  - Hall Johnson as Deacon Crow
  - James Baskett as Fats Crow
  - Nick Stewart as Specks Crow
  - Jim Carmichael as Dopey Crow
- The King's Men as the Roustabout Chorus
- Noreen Gammill as Elephant Catty
- Dorothy Scott as Elephant Giddy
- Sarah Selby as Elephant Prissy
- Billy Bletcher as Clown
- Malcolm Hutton as Skinny, the boy who taunts Dumbo
- John McLeish as the narrator

== Production ==
=== Development ===
Dumbo is based upon a children's story written by Helen Aberson-Mayer and Harold Pearl, with illustrations by Helen Durney. The children's book was first brought to the attention of Walt Disney in late 1939 by Kay Kamen, the studio's head of merchandise licensing, who showed a prototype of the Roll-A-Book that included Dumbo. Disney immediately grasped its possibilities and heartwarming story and purchased the rights to it.

Originally intended as a short film, Disney soon realized a decent book adaption needed a feature-length film. At the time, the foreign markets in Europe had been curtailed due to World War II, which caused Pinocchio and Fantasia to fail at the box office. With the film's modest budget, Dumbo was intended to be a low-budget feature designed to bring revenue to the studio. Story artists Dick Huemer and Joe Grant were assigned to develop the plot into a feature-length film.

From January 22 to March 21, 1940, they wrote a 102-page script outline in chapters, much like a book, an unusual way of writing a film script. They conceived the stork-delivery and the pink elephants sequences and had Dumbo's mother renamed from "Mother Ella" to "Mrs. Jumbo". They riffed on elephants' fear of mice by replacing a wise robin named "Red" found in the original story with the wisecracking mouse character, Timothy. They also added a "rusty black crow", which was later expanded into five. Regardless of this, very little was changed from the original draft. In March 1940, a story team headed by Otto Englander translated the outline into story sketches.

=== Animation ===
From Disney's perspective, Dumbo required none of the special effects that had slowed down production and grew the budgets of Pinocchio, Fantasia, and Bambi. When the film went into production in early 1941, supervising director Ben Sharpsteen was given orders to keep the film simple and inexpensive. As a result, the character designs are simpler, background paintings are less detailed, and a number of held cels (or frames) were used in the character animation. Although the film is more "cartoony" than previous Disney films, the animators brought elephants and other animals into the studio to study their movement.

Watercolor paint was used to render the backgrounds. Dumbo is one of the few Disney features to use the technique, which was also used for Snow White and the Seven Dwarfs, and regularly employed for the various Disney cartoon shorts. The other Disney features used oil paint and gouache. 2002's Lilo & Stitch, which drew influences from Dumbo, also made use of watercolor backgrounds.

For the part in the "Pink Elephants" sequence where the background is black and the elephants are composed of changing color gradations, it is actually the animation cels that are painted black, while the elephant characters are fully transparent, except for the line drawings. The real backgrounds consist of the various color gradations, which are visible through the transparent elephants.

==== Disney animators' strike ====
During a story meeting for Bambi on February 27, 1940, Disney observed that Dumbo was "an obvious straight cartoon" and that the animators that were assigned on Bambi were not appropriate for the look of Dumbo. Animators such as Art Babbitt and Ward Kimball were considered for the film. For that reason, less experienced animators were brought on to animate the characters. Kimball recalled that Disney approached him in a parking lot about Dumbo and summarized the entire story in five minutes.

"And listening to him tell that story," Kimball noted, "I could tell that the picture was going to work. Because everything sounded right. It had a great plot." In spite of this, Bill Tytla, who was one of the studio's top animators, animated the title character, but admitted that "it was in the nature of the film to go very fast and get it out in a hurry." To speed up production, Disney used photostats of story sketches instead of full layout artwork for the film, and had experienced animators to supervise the younger, less experienced animators assigned on the film.

Production was interrupted on May 29, 1941, when a significant portion of the Disney animation staff initiated a strike. Notably, Kimball continued to work on the film despite his sympathy for the strikers' grievances.

Some have interpreted the clowns' requests to get a raise from their boss being a reference to the Disney animators that went on strike in 1941, during the creation of the film, demanding higher pay from Walt himself. Animator and strike organizer Art Babbitt denied this, saying he had been assigned to animate the sequence before the strike. "People attached political significance to what happened there. You know, 'Let's go on strike' and so on. We weren't thinking strike at the time. In fact, there never would have been a strike if it hadn't been forced on us."

== Music ==
Dumbo

Studio album by Frank Churchill and Oliver Wallace
- Released: 1941
- Label: Disneyland

Frank Churchill and Oliver Wallace scored the film while Ned Washington wrote the lyrics to the songs. For their work on the score, Churchill and Wallace won the Academy Award for Best Original Score. Churchill and Washington's work on "Baby Mine" also garnered a nomination for the Academy Award for Best Original Song.

=== Songs ===
Original songs performed in the film include:

No.	Title	Performer(s)	Length
1.	"Look Out for Mr. Stork"	The Sportsmen
2.	"Casey Junior"	The Sportsmen
3.	"Song of the Roustabouts"	The King's Men
4.	"Baby Mine"	Betty Noyes
5.	"The Clown Song (A.K.A. We're Gonna Hit the Big Boss for a Raise)"	Billy Bletcher, Eddie Holden and Billy Sheets
6.	"Pink Elephants on Parade"	The Sportsmen
7.	"When I See an Elephant Fly"	Cliff Edwards and the Hall Johnson Choir
8.	"When I See an Elephant Fly (Reprise)"	Chorus

== Release ==
The original 1941 theatrical trailer of Dumbo

Dumbo was completed and delivered to Disney's distributor, RKO Radio Pictures, on September 11, 1941. RKO initially balked at the film's 64-minute length and asked Disney to add another ten minutes. Disney refused, "No, that's as far as I can stretch it. You can stretch a thing so far and then it won't hold. The picture is right as it is. And another ten minutes is liable to cost five hundred thousand dollars. I can't afford it." The film was re-released in theaters in 1949, 1959, 1972, and 1976.

=== Television broadcast ===
Dumbo had its television premiere on September 14, 1955, albeit severely edited, as an installment of the Disneyland television show. The film was shown unaltered on September 17, 1978, as part of a two-night salute to the program's 25th anniversary.

=== Home media ===
Along with Alice in Wonderland, Dumbo was the first of Disney's canon of animated films to be released on home video. The film was originally released in June 1981, on VHS, LaserDisc and Betamax as a rental only before becoming available for sale in early 1982. Sales were extended to CED in October 1982. It was re-released on VHS and Betamax as part of the Walt Disney Classics series in November 1985.

The film was re-released on VHS and LaserDisc in July 1991. Another re-issue on VHS and LaserDisc occurred in October 1994, as a part of the Walt Disney Masterpiece Collection. On October 23, 2001, a 60th Anniversary Edition was released in VHS and DVD formats.

In 2006, a "Big Top Edition" of the film was released on DVD. A 70th Anniversary Edition of the film was released in the United States in September 2011. The 70th Anniversary Edition was produced in two packages: a two-disc Blu-ray/DVD combo and a one-disc DVD. The film was also released as a movie download. All versions of the 70th Anniversary Edition contain deleted scenes and several bonus features, including "Taking Flight: The Making of Dumbo" and "The Magic of Dumbo: A Ride of Passage", while the two-disc Blu-ray version includes games, animated shorts, and several exclusive features. The film was re-released on Blu-ray and DVD in April 2016, to celebrate its 75th anniversary.

== Reception ==
=== Box office ===
Despite the advent of World War II, Dumbo was still the most financially successful Disney film of the 1940s. After its October 23 release, Dumbo proved to be a financial miracle compared to other Disney films. The simple film only cost $950,000 (equivalent to $20,790,000 in 2025) to produce, half the cost of Snow White, less than a third of the cost of Pinocchio, and certainly less than the expensive Fantasia. Dumbo eventually grossed roughly more than $1.3 million (equivalent to $35,020,000 in 2025) during its original release. The film returned a profit of $850,000.

=== Critical reception ===
Upon its initial release, Dumbo received widespread acclaim for its animation and story. Variety wrote that Dumbo was "a pleasant little story, plenty of pathos mixed with the large doses of humor, a number of appealing new animal characters, lots of good music, and the usual Disney skillfulness in technique in drawing and use of color." Cecelia Ager, writing in PM, called Dumbo "the nicest, kindest Disney yet. It has the most taste, beauty, compassion, skill, restraint. It marks a return to Disney first principles, the animal kingdom—that happy land where Disney workers turn into artists; where their imagination, playfulness, ingenuity, daring flourish freest; where, in short, they're home."

Bosley Crowther, reviewing for The New York Times, wrote that the film was "the most genial, the most endearing, the most completely precious cartoon feature film ever to emerge from the magical brushes of Walt Disney's wonder-working artists". Time wrote: "Like story and characters, Dumbo's coloring is soft and subdued, free from picture-postcard colors and confusing detail—a significant technical advance. But the charm of Dumbo is that it again brings to life that almost human animal kingdom where Walter Elias Disney is king of them all."

Harrison's Reports praised the film as "one of Walt Disney's most delightful offerings. Technically, it is excellent; the color is exceptionally good. The story itself is pleasing; it combines comedy with human appeal. The only fault is that occasionally the action slows down."

Time had originally scheduled to run a story with an appearance cover for "Mammal of the Year" (a play on its annual "Man/Person of the Year" honor) on December 8, 1941. The attack on Pearl Harbor on December 7 of that year had postponed it, and the story was later published on December 29.

Among retrospective reviews, film critic Leonard Maltin stated that Dumbo is his favorite of Disney's films and he described it as "one of Walt Disney's most charming animated films". In 2011, Richard Corliss of Time named the film as one of the 25 all-time best animated films. In October 2026, USA Today surveyed an array of people from across the entertainment industry to rank the 100 best animated movies of all-time and Dumbo ranked 8th best of all-time. On the review aggregator website Rotten Tomatoes, Dumbo has an approval rating of 95% based on 44 reviews, with an average score of 8.3/10. The website's consensus reads "Dumbo packs plenty of story into its brief runtime, along with all the warm animation and wonderful music you'd expect from a Disney classic." Metacritic has assigned a weighted score of 96 out of 100 for Dumbo based on 11 reviews, indicating "universal acclaim".

==== Depiction of African Americans ====
The film has been criticized for its stereotypical depiction of black people. The Encyclopedia of Racism in American Films (2018) notes that "All of the circus laborers are African American, the only time that blacks are seen in any great number in the entire movie." Film scholar Richard Schickel, in his 1968 book The Disney Version, argued that the group of crows in the film were African American stereotypes. The lead crow, voiced by white actor Cliff Edwards in an imitation of Southern African American dialect, was named "Jim Crow", after the pre-Civil-War minstrel character. The term had become a pejorative term for African Americans, and commonly referred to racial segregation laws, and the character's name was changed in the 1950s to "Dandy Crow" in attempt to avoid controversy.

The other crows were voiced by African American actors and singers of the popular all-black "Hall Johnson Choir", including actors James Baskett (Song of the South) and Nick Stewart (The Amos 'n' Andy Show). Ward Kimball, the chief animator of the crows, used famous African-American dancers Freddie and Eugene Jackson as live-action reference for the characters. Karina Longworth, exploring the history of Song of the South in her podcast You Must Remember This, discussed the basis of the crows in minstrel show culture, as part of a wider use of minstrel culture by Walt Disney.

The crow characters have been praised by a number of critical sources. Animation historian John Canemaker felt that the crows were amongst the very few characters in the film that sympathize and are empathetic with Dumbo's plight. Being a marginalized ethnic group themselves, they can relate to Dumbo as a fellow outcast. Canemaker further added that the crows "are the most intelligent, the happiest, the freest spirited characters in the whole film."

In 1980, film critic Michael Wilmington referred to the crows as "father figures", self-assured individuals who are "obvious parodies of proletarian blacks", but comments, "The crows are the snappiest, liveliest, most together characters in the film. They are tough and generous. They bow down to no one. And, of course, it is they who teach Dumbo to fly."

In 2017, Whoopi Goldberg expressed the desire for the crow characters to be more merchandised by Disney, "because those crows sing the song in Dumbo that everybody remembers." In 2019, Floyd Norman, the first African-American animator hired at Walt Disney Productions during the 1950s, defended the crows in an article entitled Black Crows and Other PC Nonsense.

The crows were not included in the 2019 live-action/CGI remake of Dumbo. In 2019, it was reported that an edited version of the animated film without the crows would be featured on the forthcoming Disney+ service. The movie streams on Disney+ uncensored, with an advisory in the synopsis warning "it may contain outdated cultural depictions." In 2021, the film was one of several that Disney limited to viewers 7 years and older on their service Disney+, citing similarity of the crows' depictions to "racist minstrel shows".

=== Awards and nominations ===
Award	Category	Nominee(s)	Result	Ref.
Academy Awards	Best Scoring of a Musical Picture	Frank Churchill and Oliver Wallace	Won	
Academy Awards	Best Original Song	"Baby Mine"; Music by Frank Churchill; Lyrics by Ned Washington	Nominated	
Cannes Film Festival	Best Animation Design	Ben Sharpsteen	Won	
National Board of Review Awards	Top Ten Films		5th Place	
National Film Preservation Board	National Film Registry		Inducted	
Online Film & Television Association Awards	Hall of Fame – Motion Picture		Inducted	

== Media and merchandise ==
=== Books ===
- Walt Disney's Dumbo: Happy to Help: (ISBN 0-7364-1129-1) A picture book published by Random House Disney, written by Liane Onish and illustrated by Peter Emslie. It was published January 23, 2001. This paperback is for children aged 4–8. Twenty-four pages long, its 0.08 of an inch thick, and with cover dimensions of 7.88 x 7.88 inches.
- Walt Disney's Dumbo Book of Opposites: (ISBN 0-307-06149-3) A book published in August 1997 by Golden Books under the Golden Board Book brand. It was written by Alan Benjamin, illustrated by Peter Emslie, and edited by Heather Lowenberg. Twelve pages long and a quarter of an inch thick, this board edition book had dimensions of 7.25 x 6.00 inches.
- Walt Disney's Dumbo the Circus Baby: (ISBN 0-307-12397-9) A book published in September 1993 by Golden Press under the A Golden Sturdy Shape Book brand. Illustrated by Peter Emslie and written by Diane Muldrow, this book is meant for babies and preschoolers. Twelve pages long and half an inch thick, this book's cover size is 9.75 x 6.25 inches.

=== Theme parks ===
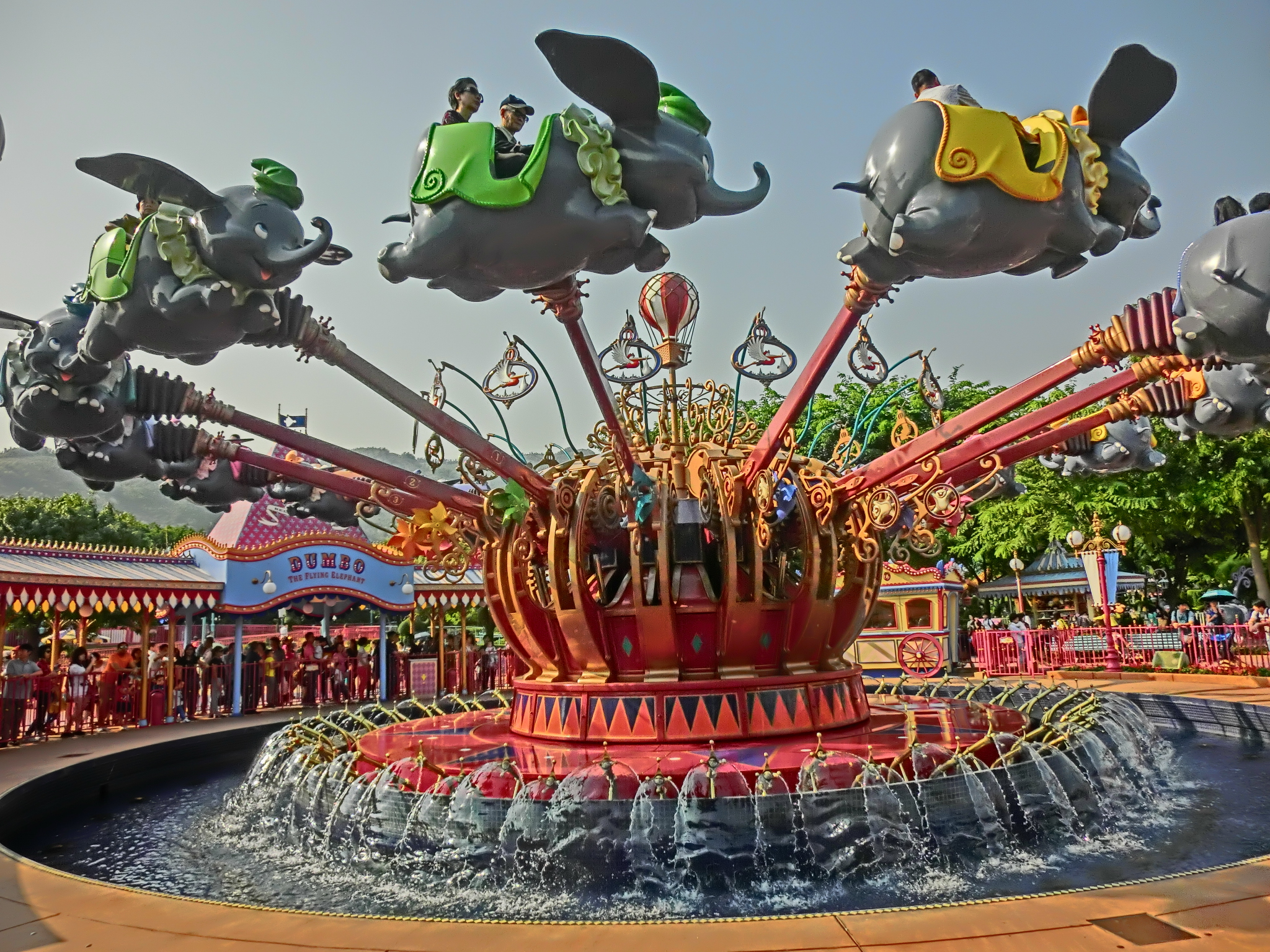
Dumbo the Flying Elephant, as it appears in Hong Kong Disneyland.

Dumbo the Flying Elephant is a popular ride that appears in Disneyland, Walt Disney World's Magic Kingdom, Tokyo Disneyland, Disneyland Park (Paris), and Hong Kong Disneyland. It is located in Fantasyland.

The Casey Jr. Circus Train is an attraction found at Disneyland and Disneyland Paris.

In June 2009, Disneyland introduced a flying Dumbo to their nighttime fireworks show, in which the elephant flies around Sleeping Beauty Castle while fireworks synched to music go off.

Casey Junior is the second float in the Main Street Electrical Parade and its versions. Casey, driven by Goofy, pulls a drum with the parade logo and Mickey Mouse and Minnie Mouse.

=== Video games ===
The Ringmaster appears as one of four villains in the 1999 PC game Disney's Villains' Revenge. In the game, the Disney Villains alter the happy endings from Jiminy Cricket's book; in particular, the Ringmaster forces Dumbo to endlessly perform humiliating stunts in his circus. In the end, the Ringmaster is defeated when he is knocked unconscious by a well-aimed custard pie.

Dumbo appears in the popular PlayStation 2 game Kingdom Hearts released in 2002 in the form of a summon that the player can call upon in battle for aid. Sora, the protagonist, flies on Dumbo while he splashes enemies with water from his trunk. Dumbo reprises his role as a summon in the follow-up game Kingdom Hearts: Chain of Memories released in 2004 for the Game Boy Advance.

Dumbo, Timothy Q. Mouse, the Ringmaster, Mrs. Jumbo, and Mr. Stork appear as playable characters in the world builder video game Disney Magic Kingdoms, as part of the main storyline of the game.

=== Dumbo's Circus ===
Dumbo's Circus is a live-action/puppet television series for preschool audiences that aired on The Disney Channel in the 1980s. Unlike in the film, Dumbo spoke on the show. Each character would perform a special act, which ranged from dancing and singing to telling knock knock jokes.

=== Cancelled sequel ===
In 2001, the "60th Anniversary Edition" DVD of Dumbo featured a sneak peek of the proposed sequel Dumbo II, including new character designs and storyboards. Robert C. Ramirez (Joseph: King of Dreams) was to direct the sequel, in which Dumbo and his circus friends navigated a large city after being left behind by their traveling circus. Dumbo II also sought to explain what happened to Dumbo's father, Mr. Jumbo.

Dumbo's circus friends included the chaotic twin bears Claude and Lolly, the curious zebra Dot, the older, independent hippo Godfry, and the adventurous ostrich Penny. The animals were metaphors for the different stages of childhood. Dumbo II was supposed to be set on the day immediately following the end of the first Dumbo movie. John Lasseter cancelled Dumbo II, soon after being named Chief Creative Officer of Walt Disney Animation Studios in 2006.

=== Live-action adaptation ===
In July 2014, Walt Disney Pictures announced that a live-action adaptation of Dumbo was in development. In the same announcement, Ehren Kruger was confirmed as the screenwriter, as well as co-producer with Justin Springer. In March 2015, Tim Burton was announced as the director. On January 11, 2017, it was reported that Will Smith was in talks to star in the remake as the father of some children who befriend Dumbo. That same day, it was revealed that Tom Hanks had reportedly been offered to play the film's villain.

In February, it was announced that Smith would not be starring in the film. Smith passed on the project due to a disagreement over salary and scheduling and to star in Bad Boys for Life. He played the role of Genie in the 2019 live-action remake of Aladdin. In March 2017, Eva Green was in talks to play a trapeze artist. Following this announcement, Danny DeVito was cast as a ringleader named Medici. Two weeks later, Colin Farrell entered negotiations to play the role of Holt, which was originally offered to Will Smith.

Michael Keaton confirmed that he would play the film's villain on June 26, 2017. Filming took place at Cardington Studios in Bedfordshire, England. In July 2017, Disney announced the casting for all of the principal roles, and that the film would be released on March 29, 2019. DeObia Oparei, Joseph Gatt and Alan Arkin play new characters created for the film.

== See also ==
- Seeing pink elephants
- Roles of mothers in Disney media
