= Family in advertising =

Advertising trope

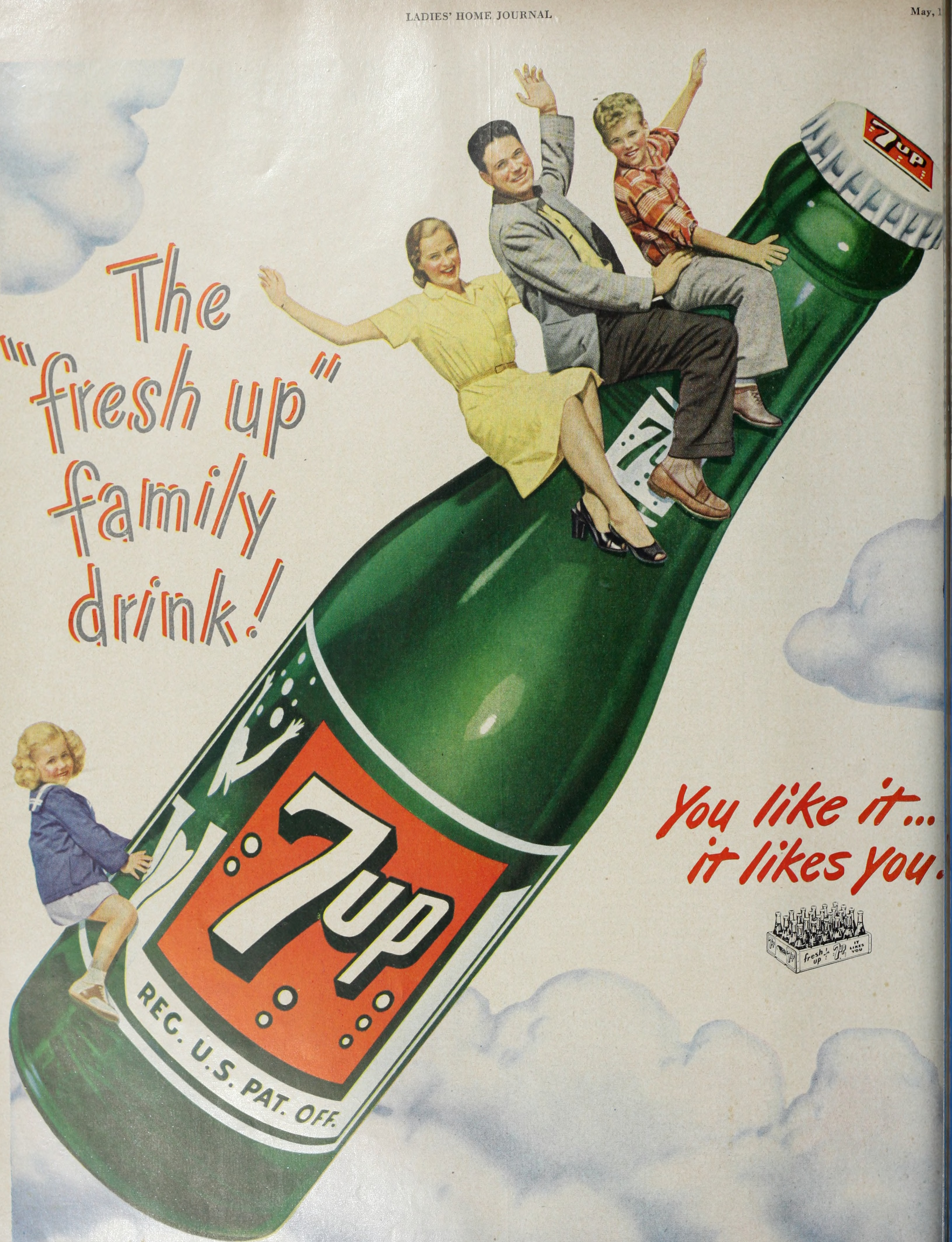
1948 7 Up ad in the Ladies' Home Journal, an American magazine

Since the Industrial Revolution, use of the family in advertising has become a prominent practice in marketing campaigns to increase profits. Some sociologists say that these advertisements can influence behavior and attitudes; advertisers tend to portray family members in an era's traditional, socially-acceptable roles.

== History ==
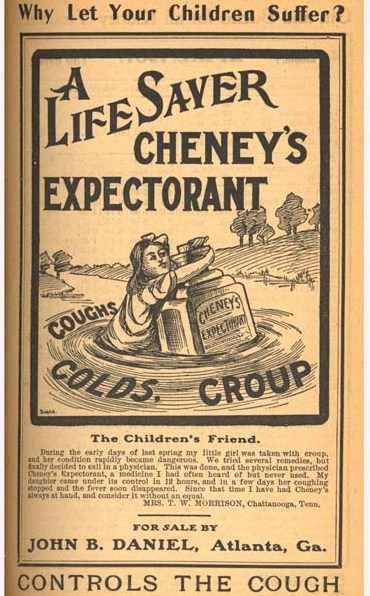
1906 advertisement for Cheney's Expectorant

After the Industrial Revolution, advertising increased and the use of family images became prevalent. Advertising changed, from information about the availability of goods in 17th- and 18th-century Europe for an audience who lived and worked near the vendors (and their wares) to multi-million-dollar campaigns which attempted to connect and persuade people around the world. Large companies emerged as mass producers, products were branded, and customers began exhibiting brand loyalty.

Persuading consumers to purchase one brand instead of another became vital to advertising in competitive industrial markets. Advertising's size and scope changed as marketing strategies began to target specific audience, using symbols, representations, and stereotypes (including the family). Because family life stresses group benefits, preferences, and successes over those of the individual, collectivist societies tend to use more family symbols in advertising than individualist societies. Collectivist South Korea has more success with family advertisements than the United States, which views itself as individualistic.

Post-industrial advertising reaffirmed widely-held social values such as heterosexuality and those of the middle class, neglecting alternative values or lifestyles. Countries such as Japan continue to present the family stereotypically, especially in television advertisements. Many advertising agencies, however, have begun to more accurately reflect consumer diversity in lifestyles and family types.

== Function ==
The family, a popular symbol in commercial advertising, is used to increase profit and develop a positive reputation with consumers. It functions on three levels of persuasion: social, psychological and personal.

Social persuasion appeals to one's role in a group and one's corresponding expectations; it appeals to reference groups, social class, culture and subculture. The family symbol is socially persuasive, appealing to one's role in the family and their corresponding expectations. There is emotional pressure, due to psychological attachments in family relationships. Psychological persuasion in advertising appeals to motivation, attitudes, and personality. A parent might want to purchase a product which limits harm for their child due to their emotional attachment to the child, and emotional and psychological persuasion are popular advertising strategies. Family affects audiences at the psychological level, the level at which advertising is most effective.

Personal persuasion appeals to one's demographic identity or consumer behaviors. The family is persuasive because although a family may make a purchase decision as a unit, one family member may make most of its buying decisions. Targeting that person, noting their role in the family and the corresponding responsibility to make family purchase decisions, is more productive than targeting other family members. The McDonald's Corporation in India has successfully marketed itself as "McDonald's Family Restaurant".

=== Sociological interpretations ===
Advertising is used to attract customers to a business's products or services, making statements about race, social class, gender, values, and family. It describes these social categories and prescribes behavior according to social ideals or norms. According to Belk and Pollay (cited in Burke's master's thesis), advertisements show the ideal life and instruct in how to live. Targeting specific groups of people for products and services, advertisements reflect changes in social norms and acceptable behavior. Some argue that the image of a family only plays a symbolic role, reflecting contemporary cultural values. Sociologists have challenged the public to study ads with family images as marketing messages and vehicles for behavior and attitudes towards society.

Advertisements depicting families note the transition from modernity to postmodernity. This transition is that of middle class nuclear families (where heterosexuality is the norm) to the recognition and acceptance of a variety of family types, embracing societal polysexuality and plurality, the transition from popular culture to sub-cultures and multiculturalism. According to literary critic Fredric Jameson, "Our advertising ... is fed by postmodernism in all the arts, and is inconceivable without it."

== Family members ==
=== Parents ===
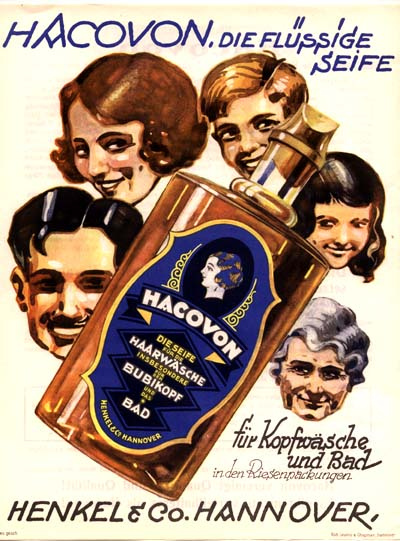
1920 German advertisement for Hacavon shampoo

Throughout history, mothers have been portrayed as the primary physical caregivers of children. Physical caregiving includes tasks such as breastfeeding and changing diapers. Some theorize that women have a natural instinct to provide care. Fathers have been more likely to be portrayed as playing with their children, more with sons than daughters. Similar to the decline in wives being portrayed solely as housekeepers, the portrayal of mothers as the primary physical caretakers of children has also declined; mothers are portrayed more in recreational activities with their offspring.

=== Other family members ===
Like fathers, other male family members (including sons and grandsons) are primarily portrayed in play activities with children. Young female family members are more likely depicted in activities related to household chores and child care. Grandparents are largely absent from advertising.

Family images depend on their source and the audience the source intends to reach. In a women's magazine, such as Good Housekeeping, women are portrayed primarily as housewives.

=== Husbands ===
As wives in advertising have reflected the general view of their appropriate role, husbands also reflect the cultural values surrounding their role; images of the husband working outside the home and handling the family finances are common. These roles were especially prevalent in 1920, 1936, and 1970. Husbands have generally not been depicted in advertising doing household chores, except when they humorously perform them badly. The portrayal of husbands and wives in an intimate, romantic relationship has increased.

=== Wives ===
Advertising generally reflects popular contemporary attitudes toward gender roles. During the 1920s, when relatively few wives worked outside the home, working wives were rarely portrayed in advertising. This changed during the Great Depression, when more wives entered the workforce. Since then, as housekeeping becomes a less-important family role, the number of advertisements depicting women performing household tasks has declined.

== See also ==
- Advertising campaign
- Capitalism
- Consumerism
- Commercialism
- Outline of marketing
- Marketing
- Influence of mass media
- Representation (arts)
- Sex in advertising
- Parental portrayals in the media
