= Dumbo the Flying Elephant (story) =

1939 children's story

Dumbo the Flying Elephant is a 1939 children's story by Helen Aberson-Mayer and Harold Pearl. The story was adapted into Dumbo by Walt Disney in 1941.

The husband and wife writing duo, Aberson-Mayer and Harold Pearl, co-wrote the Dumbo story and sold it to Roll-a-Book in 1939. No copies of the roll-a-book version have been found, though proofs of the story and examples of earlier versions of the medium indicate it may have existed.

Full surviving text of Dumbo the Flying Elephant (1939) as a galley proof.

Everett Whitmyre, the Syracuse advertising agent behind Roll-a-Book, sold the story to Walt Disney in 1939. The story was supplemented with illustrations by Helen Durney. Aberson-Mayer may have earned about US$1,000, some royalties, and credit rights for the sale. A series of Disney Golden Book versions of the story began publication in 1940.
