= Parental portrayals in the media =

The portrayal of parents in media sometimes depicts gender stereotypes in society, often highlighting the "traditional nuclear family" as opposed to nonconventional configurations. Social Scientists have found that home, family, and romance are three of the most important components of the way characters are presented. Moreover, these qualities are often presented in a stereotypical and traditional fashion. In the 1950s the meaning of the word parent coincided with the nuclear family structure—husband, wife, and children. Parents had a responsibility to uphold traditional gender roles in society. Gender roles in society were as follows: fathers work outside of the home and bring in the bread (take on the role of providers), while mothers tend to housework, make sure they are emotionally available, and look after the children (take on the role of caretakers). In today's time, the definition and responsibility of a parent has become more flexible/adjustable since the 1950s, although some parents tend to stick to their traditional gender roles. For example, two-married-parent families were the most common type of family unit a generation ago; however, in the year 2000 that particular family structure could only be found in one out of four households. Because of the shift in parenting, media outlets took it upon themselves to provide representation for certain family structures outside of the nuclear family, leaving them flexible as well. Mass media has presented a multitude of family structures and has promoted the acceptance of alternate family structures in many ways including television, newspapers, movies, commercials, books, comics, etc. Media is linked to the structure of families, given that parents and their children confide in it when questioning their own family and parenting practices. Its influence impacts parents positively and negatively, either by underrepresentation (dumb, irresponsible) or drawing the perfect picture (good mothers and fathers).

== Major theories ==
=== Family and gender in general ===
There have been a number of approaches to ultimately study the media's portrayal of the family. One theoretical approach surrounds the cultivation perspective which states that cultivation of a worldview skewed toward that of televised portrayals among heavy viewers. According to a 1976 study done by Gerber and Gross, this type of worldview becomes the social reality of television heavy viewers. Social learning theory has also been used as a theoretical framework for study the effects that the media has on the individual. Evidence also suggests that depictions can have serious consequences. Television, according to a study done by Signorielli in 1990, entrenches the cognitive schema in children that women are happy when they are doing traditional gender roles like staying home to raise children and that men are more ambitious than women are.

=== Portrayals of fathers ===
Early television fathers were depicted as bumbling fathers in working-class families, for example, Homer Simpson (The Simpsons) or authoritative figures in suburban families, for example, Ward Cleaver (Leave It to Beaver). Over time, changing economic and political situations contributed to changes in family life. As women began to work outside the home and domestic gender roles were adjusted, the idea of the nuclear family changed. Fathers adapted to be more nurturing to their children and more participative in family and domestic roles. Fogel, a television media expert, refers to this as the "new father;" he is a mix of traditional masculinity and traits typically associated with mothers. Instead of simply being the breadwinner, the typical idea of the father has shifted to include traits associated with being a “good” father. This relies on both being supportive to his wife and to his children. The transition can be seen in the multi-generational family shown in Modern Family. Jay Pritchett, the father on the show with two adult children, says "90% of being a dad is just showing up." He represents the traditional idea of less involved parenting by the father. In comparison, Phil Dunphy, who has three adolescent children, describes his parenting style as "peerenting," meaning he seeks to be both a peer and parent to his children. His more hands-on approach marks the transition from the father who just need to show up to the "new" father who is actively involved in his children's lives.

==== Stay-at-home fathers ====
The traditional role of "father" in the household is evolving; fathers are now expected to embrace more hands-on duties with their children. The roles are shifting so much that there has been an increase in "stay at home fathers", compared to previous generations. Also, increases of positively portrayed stay at home fathers in the media have been indicated. Stay at home fathers have made appearances in television shows and documentaries. An increase in media presence can contribute to the understanding and support for men who choose to care for their children. This evolution of "fatherhood" shows the dynamic nature of parental roles. A few overarching themes in fatherhood were found in a study interviewing 32 men across the United States. These themes consist of fathers feeling emotional closeness with their children, positive reaction from others about being a stay at home fathers, and importance and pride in family work. The typical reasons behind becoming a stay at home father: wives high salaries, job “issues”, and wives being relocated for their jobs.

==== "Disneyland dads" ====
The term "Disneyland dads" refers to fathers who are considered to be the nonresidential parent. However, any father can express this type of characteristic. "Disneyland dads" have the tendency to undertake recreational activities over real parental responsibilities that can include participating in their child's day-to-day activities. In other words, they represent the fun parent while leaving the "residential parent" to deal with child rearing. These dads can be permissive and fail to discipline their children properly. Richard Gilmore, a father and grandfather in Gilmore Girls, is a splitting image of this. Richard is rich and tends to buy his daughter's and granddaughter's love and approval with his money, while his wife, Emily Gilmore takes on the role of the disciplinarian. Mothers can be classified as Disneyland parents also. According to Stewart, information on Disneyland moms is harder to come by given the fact that mothers are more likely to display nurturing behaviors when they are primary caregivers, leaving secondary primary caregiving to the fathers who fall back on more leisure activities.

=== Portrayals of mothers ===
==== New momism ====
Susan Douglas and Meredith Michaels refer to "new momism" as shaping current Western motherhood. New momism introduces the myth of the perfect mother who assumes all the roles needed of her within the household, does so flawlessly, and emerges from the experience fulfilled and complete. Douglas and Michaels suggest that the media only superficially celebrates mothers by presenting standards, values, and practices that in reality place expectations on mothers that are impossible to reach. New momism is reinforced in the media through portrayals of perfect and unrealistic mothers, and through “news reports emphasizing the unspeakable tragedies that await children of mothers who dare deviate from the One True Path of Momism” according to Judith Stadtman Tucker. New momism also creates the false dichotomy of the “good” versus “bad” mother, and the media supplements viewers with the attitudes and practices that characterize both labels: the good mother is always in control, able to fulfill all responsibilities toward children and husband, while the bad mother is overwhelmed, disorganized, and lost among the chaos.

==== Mommy wars ====
“Mommy wars," as introduced by Nina Darnton in a June 1990 Newsweek article, represents the media-staged tensions between stay-at-home mothers and working mothers. Stay-at-home mothers criticize working mothers for abandoning their children and homes to build a personal career, while working mothers resent stay-at-home mothers both because of the time and attention they are able to devote to their children, and because of the notion that a mother is only "good enough" if she can devote all her time and attention to the children and household. Susan Podnieks argues that the "mommy myth", as well as the supposed battle between working and stay-at-home mothers, are circulated by news media and talk shows, sparking debates about the proper sphere of women. As a result, the general public believes that "there is a bitter war in the suburban cul-de-sacs of the United States between the complacent minivan-driving stay-at-home moms and the overachieving soon-to-be-burnout working mothers who still think they can have it all." This leads to grouping mothers into rigid and rival categories, leading them to feel insecure about their mothering, and in turn leading them to devalue other mothers in order to elevate themselves.

==== Media mother police ====
The media mother police refers to the media's surveillance and policing of mothers (specifically famous mothers) by dissecting and evaluating their parenting practices. Susan Douglas and Meredith Michaels use the term to describe child care experts who engage in the practice of watching over famous mothers and judge their efforts. Elizabeth Podnieks uses it to refer to reporters, the paparazzi, and all those involved within entertainment journalism who participate in maternal surveillance. The media mother police simultaneously reinforces The Mommy Myth by showcasing examples of perfect and airbrushed celebrity mothers, and also heightens the stigma of the "bad" mother by exposing the failures and debaucheries of certain celebrating mothers.

==== Portrayals of single mothers ====
The depiction of single mothers in the media is crucial because it impacts children's views on parenthood. This topic became especially relevant after the 1990s. Between 1986 and 1989 there was a 19% increase in pregnancy for 15- to 17-year-olds, consequently the number of single mothers increased. In a study conducted by sociologist Mary Larson, participants were asked to view several soap operas and comment on the role of the single mother. The study consisted of 163 junior and senior high-school students in a rural-suburban community in Northern Illinois in 1993. The student body was 9% minority and had an average family income of $41,000. The students in the study declared that most soap operas depict the single mother as white upper middle class with a successful job. Participants also noted that coping with a job and having a child did not seem to be a problem for the mothers. Their children were allowed to attend social events and each woman had a dominant male figure who helped with the baby on a daily basis. After viewing the shows, participants were asked to answer several questions on single mothers. Most responses indicate a skewed perception of being a single mother. Most students did not believe single mothers were more likely to live in poverty and that most babies had a dominant male presence in their lives. Other scientists have determined that men are actually more commonly portrayed as single parents in prime time television. One study^{[which?]} revealed that men outnumber women by three to one as being single parents. Additionally, women are more frequently portrayed as married in a home setting. Whereas single men never endure the conflict of balancing their work and family life, women are depicted as struggling to balance both.

=== Portrayal of African American families ===
Given the changing traditional structure of the American family, it would be suspected different family dynamics are depicted by different characters and themes. For example, one would expect television to encapsulate the different themes and qualities of the African American family that are a result of prejudice and discrimination. However, studies have shown that the television characteristics of people of color do not reveal the unique experiences of being African, Latino, Native American or Asian American, but rather represent the perceptions of the White producers. From the period of 1969–1982 African American families were almost never portrayed as husband, wife and children living together under one roof. Moreover, most families were highlighted as being "poor and struggling". These representations make it appear as though African Americans cannot care for their families accurately. As pressure increased on the industry to produce a more accurate portrayal of the nuclear African American family, shows such as The Cosby Show, 227, and Charlie & Co became popular. The emergence of these shows created a TV culture that more accurately depicted an intact African American family. Unfortunately, data reveals that the same cannot be said for other minority families such as Latino Americans.

=== Portrayal of Latino American Families ===
In 1984, the media portrayed Latinos as illegal aliens that were on the run. This wasn't an accurate representation of who they really were and the lifestyles they lived in reality (doctors, lawyers, husbands, wives, etc.). The study Latinwood and TV 2000 restated that Latino Americans were not accurately presented in the media. They were highly underrepresented and superficially/negatively illustrated on screen, usually characterized as nannies, gardeners, and servants. Just as there was an uproar about media not accurately representing African Americans families properly, there was a similar issue for Latino Americans. With this issue, came the emergence of successful Latino-themed shows such as Dora the Explorer, George Lopez, Ugly Betty, and Wizards of Waverly Place. As media outlets started to present more authentic Latino representation, it gave way for these shows to make an appearance: Jane the Virgin, Queen of the South, One Day at a Time, and On My Block which is a show that represents both Latino and African American families and their culture.

=== Portrayal of Interracial Families ===
Interracial relationships are likely to be invisible in the media, or they are portrayed as problematic/ unnatural. For example, Black/White relationships are depicted as dangerous. It wasn't until an episode of Star Trek, that the first Black/White kiss was televised. Soon after, an interracial couple on The Jeffersons appeared on television. In the show, Tom (White) and Helen (Black) were often taunted by their Black neighbor, George, for being two different races. Helen and Tom had a biracial daughter who George would refer to as "zebra", which was a derogatory word. George wasn't a fan of people dating outside of their race. If shows highlighting interracial couples did premiere, they were canceled after a few seasons. The Jeffersons was canceled after a decade, True Colors was canceled after two seasons and Kevin Hill was canceled after one season. Happy Endings and Parenthood are recent shows portraying interracial couples. Although they are recent, the shows aren't portraying interracial couples properly. Interracial couples in the media are more of an elephant in the room rather than experiencing something new.

== Major empirical findings ==
=== Television ===
Over time, television series have reflected the changing norms of real families. Viewers have regarded these television families as models of familial behavior despite the unrealistic nature of many television series.

Media expert Jennifer Fogel notes that families on television have evolved to focus more on strong marital partnerships, but many shows still focus on a traditional, patriarchal family. She suggests a number of different types of families that have been seen on television in the 21st century: parents adjusting to parenthood (e.g., Yes, Dear), dysfunctional yet loyal families (e.g., Arrested Development), and blended families (e.g., The New Adventures of Old Christine). For white families, television series have included single parenthood, divorced families, and multi-generational households. In comparison, minority families on television usually conform to nuclear family roles (e.g., George Lopez, Black-ish).

In an analysis of television shows, Dr. William Douglas found modern parent-child relationships to be judged as mutually respectful. Though both mothers and fathers regularly provide support for their children, mothers were particularly likely to behave in a supportive or nurturing manner. In dealing with conflict, television fathers are more likely to use strategies which include blaming, rejection, aggressive questioning, and joking. They are more focused on winning an argument than protecting the relationship. Television mothers are more likely to use strategies that include emphasizing commonalities and using empathy in dealing with conflict such that relational goals are promoted over winning the argument. In modern television families, both mothers and fathers are more likely to work outside the home. Douglas suggests that the modern television family is reflective of the modern family in their problems. He asserts families are now unable to construct a nurturing family environment, including establishment of lasting relationships and effective socialization of children, in both families on television and in reality.

Scharrer (2001a) conducted a quantitative study investigating masculine roles within the home, and looked at 136 episodes of 29 domestic sitcoms airing from the 1950s to the 1990s. Scharrer found an increasing tendency to portray fathers as foolish and less adept at child care than mothers. The study revealed that fathers were the butt of 60% of all jokes involving the father in the 1990s sitcoms compared to 30% in the 1950s, 1960s, and 1970s.

=== Movies ===
Films that take place in the 1950s often portray an “ideal family” consisting of a breadwinner husband, a homemaker wife, and their children. To an extent, this is a reflection of the times: upon the conclusion of World War II, there was an increased importance put on the home. Women were not expected to complete secondary education and instead were pushed towards finding a husband. The film Mona Lisa Smile depicts a female professor's struggle with these expectations that have been put both on herself and her students. Many of the professor's students drop out over the course of the film to become housewives and she ultimately fails at her mission of keeping her female students in school. This "ideal family" model of the 1950s is outdated and unrealistic in today's world, however the myth lives on. Continued media portrayal of this shapes public opinion and influences our beliefs.

Over the past 20 years, more and more women have been abandoning the homemaker role in favor of a position in the workforce. There has been a distinct shift from the male-breadwinner model to more dual-earner and single-parent households, and that is not always reflected in film. The movie I Don't Know How She Does It shows a working mother trying to balance a demanding job as well as familial duties. The film Daddy Day Care is about a father that takes on the role of homemaker. However, these two films are far from the norm in terms of familial structure as seen in today's movies. The industry has yet to catch up to the current family climate completely, but films with non-conventional families are becoming more and more common.

=== Television commercials ===
Gayle Kaufman, a professor from Davidson College, explored the expanding social roles of men and women found on television in her article, "The Portrayal of Men's Family Roles in Television Commercials." Through the use of empirical observations, Kaufman's research specifically focuses on the differences in the roles of mother and fathers portrayed by the media in national television commercials. Even though the roles of both men and women have expanded from the past, majority of the commercials were found to display traditional gender ideology. Gender differences found in commercials are prevalent.

Women were found to take on stereotypical roles in many types of commercials. With regards to housework, women were found to be significantly more likely to be shown doing housework than men: cooking, cleaning, washing dishes, and shopping. Now, analyzing the data more closely, the reader can find that 79–80% of all cleaning and shopping in commercials are performed by women. Women were also found to be more responsible for washing dishes at 93% compared to men. Kaufman believes that this finding is based on the socialization process. Information not shown by the table includes the detailed explanation of the actions of the individuals in the study. With cooking commercials, many times the men and children were shown to be passively waiting to be served by their spouse. In cases where no mother is present, the same stereotypical roles are shown to be passed to the daughter as the father and/or brothers are passively waiting. Also, many of the domestic activities done by males are usually very manly, according to Kaufman, like taking out the trash. However, she says that men seemed incompetent about it. There were also striking differences in other activities as well.

When it came to interacting and spending time with children in commercials, men were found to be more likely than women to be with only boys. However, women were three times more likely to be seen with both boys and girls. Women were more likely to not only be with more children in commercials, they were more likely to take care of them as well. Compared to men's 17.7%, women were 35.0% likely to be involved in some type of childcare activity (giving medicine, putting on bandages, etc.) in commercials. This finding was significant. Like mentioned earlier, men, were more likely to care for care for male children more than female children.

However, men did surpass women in three activities with children. Contrary to popular belief, men were found to actually teach kids lessons or read to them more than women. The data showed a significant 41% for men and only 14% for women. Men were also found to be eating with children more than women in commercials.

=== Children's books ===
David Anderson and Mykol Hamilton's research focused on the portrayal of fathers and mothers in children's books and speculated on the implications of it in their 2005 article “Gender Role Stereotyping of Parents in Children’s Picture Books: The Invisible Father”. They empirically analyzed two hundred children's picture books. Out of the 139 books with parents in them. 64% of the books had mothers in them and 47.5% had fathers in them. There were sixty four books that had scenes in them with only mothers but no father scenes. Also, 19% of the books had father only scenes and no mother scenes. In general fathers were not only highly underrepresented in the children's books, but they were also not even mentioned as much as mothers.

The research also focused on the activities and emotions performed by parents in the books. They found that mothers were close to 10 times more likely to care for babies than fathers were. Mothers in the books performed every measure of nursing behavior studied by the researchers two times more than fathers. Emotionally, mothers expressed varying emotions at a greater rate than the fathers. This is contrary to the opinion of the researchers who believed that fathers would express greater amounts of overall anger than did mothers. This is not the case. The findings were significant that mothers were more likely than men to express happiness, cry, or basically have any type of emotion what so ever. Mothers were also found to actually discipline more than fathers in children's books.

The researchers use this to make a number of speculations. The authors use these findings to question the socialization process of our younger children and point out, what they think, is a glaring problem. Fathers from the data took a back seat in the lives of the children throughout these children's books. Anderson and Hamilton fear that these stereotypical portrayals socialize children during critical periods of early development in their lives. When these cognitive schema are formed it is hard to change them as time goes on. Children, according to the researchers, will expect caregiving from the mothers and less from the fathers who seem almost invisible.

=== Magazines ===
A content analysis of women's magazines by both Keller (1994) and Douglas and Michaels (2004) revealed that the articles and ads within those magazines still reinforced traditional roles of motherhood, such as caring only for children and household tasks.

Women's magazines also encourage narrow understandings of motherhood through their misrepresentation of working mothers. Smith (2001) found that articles about working mothers and daycare between 1987 and 1997 usually portrayed working mothers in a negative light, discrediting women's belonging to the public sphere (the workplace) and reaffirming their role within the private sphere (the home).

A study conducted by Johnston and Swanson (2003) that analyzed 1998 and 1999 issues of women's and parenting magazines found that employed mothers were largely underrepresented compared to at-home mothers: working mothers were present in 12% of all mother-related text units as opposed to 88% for at-home mothers.

=== Media ===
A study based in Hong Kong set out to examine “tween" girls in order to determine the media's influence on their perception of gender and identity roles. These girls, ages 8–12, were asked to take images from the media to illustrate what they thought girls and women should or should not do. The sources of media used by the girls in the study included images from: newspapers, magazines, photos of advertisements (in subways, elevators, etc.), television, and Internet. The main goal of this was to find how the media influences the perception of women in the eyes of a "tween" girl. Previous studies have shown that although children might not perform behaviors the media characterizes as “normal” right away, they store these perceptions and recall them during “real life situations”.

The interviewers asked the tweens two questions and the interviewee's were asked to reference a digital image they were asked to have captured. The girls were first asked how women/girls should or should not be. The responses were ultimately categorized under five major themes of how women and girls should act:

1. personality
2. skills and vocation
3. appearance
4. healthy and natural
5. manners and relationships

The most popular responses in regards to personality were: be yourself, be brave, and be gentle. Skills and vocation responses reflected what jobs and skills a woman should have. Housekeeping was regarded as a good skill to have because boys have poor housekeeping skills. Appearance responses included what girls should look like, and how they should not (for example, girls should be presentable not sloppy). Under the category of healthy and natural interviewee's were speaking of exercise, strength, and drug free lifestyles. Among the comments made by interviewee's about manners and relationships were those about self-control, being conservative in sexual relationships, and self-representation in the public sphere. The second thing the girls were asked was what women should or should not do. The responses were categorized into themes, stated in order of most responses in a given category to least responses in a given category: 1) appearance, 2) health and safety, 3) relationships, 4) caring for people and environment, 5) work and others.

The conclusions made from this study were as follows. Tweens' perceptions of gender and identity roles mostly come from their role models. Tweens have conservative attitudes toward sexuality, despite racy advertisements. Tweens heavily favor natural beauty and reject practices that aim to reduce weight drastically. Tweens rejected and labeled sexy appearance and pre-marital sex as inappropriate. This study showed the perceptions tween girls had as a result of the media, giving proper insight into how young girls envision adults, including mothers in the media.

== Controversies ==
Recent films and television shows that challenge the traditional family ideal have been critically acclaimed and celebrated. A non-traditional family structure is becoming more and more common in media. However, some of the most popular examples have been the topic of debate.

The 2010 film The Kids Are All Right depicts a same-sex couple, Jules and Nic, and their trials in raising two children. The film was very well-received, garnering four Oscar nominations. Critics applauded the movie for its depiction of a "realistic" lesbian couple, with Roger Ebert saying: "The Kids Are All Right centers on a lesbian marriage, but is not about one. It's a film about marriage itself, an institution with challenges that are universal.” However, the family structure in the film is a traditional one: Nic is the breadwinner and Jules is the homemaker. This dynamic is a source of tension throughout the movie and is a major obstacle in their relationship. The film is regarded as progressive while at the same time criticized for the archaic model of family.

Television has a similar example in Modern Family. Premiering in 2009 and chronicling three families portraying varying degrees social norms, Modern Family has received awards including 21 Emmys. It has also been the subject of criticism in term of familial portrayal. Phil Dunphy, a father on the show, is portrayed as foolish and easily outmaneuvered by both his wife and children. Claire, his wife, is an uptight stay-at-home mother who has become bored in her role in the family. Many critics have pointed out that both mothers on the show are not employed. In season 5 of the show Claire did return to work after her children had matured. Although on the surface, Modern Family looks like a fresh perspective on today's family environment, it has its shortcomings. The traditional model of family can be seen in the Dunphy household despite the show's promise of a modern family.

== Conclusion ==
Society usually look to views of family planning on the social media and other raw media forms to develop a vague notion, idea or plan of how a perfect family should be and act like. Over time, portrayals of both mothers and fathers in the media have adjusted to reflect changing familial norms. Both television and movies have reflected changes from the traditional family, though the nuclear family is still very present. Advertisements, children's books, and magazines still consistently represent traditional gender norms. Controversies have emerged in parental portrayals that seem to challenge traditional roles but, in reality, reinforce them.

== See also ==
- Roles of mothers in Disney media
- Family in advertising
- Family structure in the United States
- Parenting
- Gender roles in parenting and marriage
