= Helen Aberson-Mayer =

American writer

- Born: June 16, 1907 Syracuse, New York
- Died: April 3, 1999 (aged 91)
- Occupation: Children's book author
- Education: Syracuse University
- Genre: Fantasy
- Notable works: Dumbo the Flying Elephant

Helen Aberson-Mayer (June 16, 1907 – April 3, 1999) was an American children's book author.

Aberson-Mayer was best known for co-authoring the story that inspired Walt Disney's 1941 film Dumbo. In collaboration with her then husband, Harold Pearl, Aberson-Mayer wrote Dumbo the Flying Elephant and sold it to Roll-A-Book, the publisher of a kind of novelty toy, although no copies of this original version have been found. The story was later published as a children's book.

Aberson-Mayer may have also authored several other children stories, but they were never published.

== Early life and education ==
Aberson-Mayer was born on June 16, 1907, in Syracuse, New York. Her parents were Anna and Morris Aberson. Her father is listed in city directories as a cigar maker in 1914 and as a grocer in 1930. Her parents were Russian-Jewish immigrants.

Aberson-Mayer graduated from Syracuse University in 1929.

== Career ==
After graduation, she worked in New York City doing social work. She returned to Syracuse in 1933 to direct dramatic actives at a children's camp and took a position as director of dramatical activities at a municipal recreational department. In August 1937, Aberson-Mayer started work as a radio commentator.

According to her family, Aberson-Mayer may have written more children's books into the 1960s, but none of them were published. Her niece recalled two of their titles: Sim, the Seal, and Otto, The Otter.

== Personal life ==
Aberson-Mayer met Harold Pearl in October 1937, and they married on February 14, 1938.

Aberson-Mayer died on April 3, 1999.
