= Maleficent (disambiguation) =

Maleficent is a fictional character that first appeared in the 1959 Disney film Sleeping Beauty.

Maleficent may also refer to:

- Maleficent (film series), a Disney media franchise
  - Maleficent (film), a 2014 Disney film
    - Maleficent (soundtrack), a soundtrack album for the 2014 film
  - Maleficent: Mistress of Evil, a 2019 Disney film
    - Maleficent: Mistress of Evil (soundtrack), a soundtrack album for the 2019 film
