= Aurora (Sleeping Beauty) =

Fictional character from Disney's Sleeping Beauty

- Sleeping Beauty character
- Aurora wearing her blue ball gown
- First appearance: Sleeping Beauty (1959)
- Created by: Marc Davis; Hal Ambro; Les Clark; Iwao Takamoto
- Based on: Sleeping Beauty by Charles Perrault
- Voiced by: Mary Costa (original); Eddie Collins (crying; archival audio); Erin Torpey (speaking; Disney Princess Enchanted Tales); Cassidy Ladden (singing; Disney Princess Enchanted Tales); Jennifer Hale (2001–2005, 2007–2010); Kate Higgins (2010–present; speaking); Hayley Westenra (2024–present; singing); Kim Huber (albums); Leslie French (albums); Janet McTeer (narrator; Maleficent)
- Portrayed by: Elle Fanning (Maleficent film series); Eleanor Worthington Cox (8-years-old; Maleficent film series); Vivienne Jolie-Pitt (5-years-old; Maleficent film series)

In-universe information
- Full name: Aurora (birth name); Briar Rose (adoptive name)
- Nickname: Sleeping Beauty
- Title(s): Princess; Queen of the Moors (Maleficent film series)
- Affiliation: Disney Princesses
- Family: King Stefan (father); Queen Leah (mother); Maleficent (surrogate mother; Maleficent film series)
- Spouses: Prince Phillip
- Children: Princess Audrey (Descendants)
- Relatives: Flora, Fauna, and Merryweather (adoptive aunts); King Hubert (father-in-law)
- Nationality: French

Aurora, also known as Sleeping Beauty or Briar Rose, is a fictional character who appears in Disney Animation's 1959 film Sleeping Beauty. Voiced by Mary Costa, Aurora is the only child of King Stefan and Queen Leah. An evil fairy named Maleficent seeks revenge for not being invited to Aurora's christening and curses the newborn princess, foretelling that she will prick her finger on a spinning wheel's spindle and die before sunset on her sixteenth birthday. Merryweather, one of the three good fairies, weakened the curse so Aurora would only sleep. Determined to prevent this, three good fairies raise Aurora as a peasant in order to protect her, patiently awaiting her sixteenth birthday—the day the spell can only be broken by a kiss from her true love, Prince Phillip.

Aurora is based on the princess in Charles Perrault's fairy tale "Sleeping Beauty". Some elements, such as her name, are derived from the ballet The Sleeping Beauty by Pyotr Ilyich Tchaikovsky. For several years, Walt Disney had struggled to find a suitable actress to voice the princess and nearly abandoned the film entirely until Costa was discovered by composer Walter Schumann. However, Costa's southern accent nearly cost her the role until she proved that she could sustain a British accent for the duration of the film. In order to accommodate the film's unprecedentedly detailed backgrounds, Aurora's refined design demanded more effort than had ever been spent on an animated character before, with the animators drawing inspiration from Art Nouveau. Aurora wears an off-the-shoulder pink or blue ball gown with a triangular peplum, a ruffled white petticoat, long triangular sleeves, a golden necklace, a golden tiara, and blue or pink high heels. Animated by Marc Davis, Aurora's slender physique was inspired by actress Audrey Hepburn. With 18 lines of dialogue and equally few minutes of screen time, the character speaks less than any speaking main character in a feature-length Disney animated film.

When Sleeping Beauty was first released, the film was both a critical and commercial failure, discouraging the studio from adapting fairy tales into animated films for three decades. Aurora herself received negative reviews from both film and feminist critics for her passivity and similarities to Snow White, and would remain Disney's last princess until Ariel debuted 30 years later in 1989. However, Costa's vocal performance was praised, which inspired her to pursue a full-time career as an opera singer to great success. Chronologically, Aurora is the third Disney Princess in the lineup after Cinderella. Actress Elle Fanning portrayed a live-action version of Aurora in the film Maleficent (2014), a retelling of Sleeping Beauty from the perspective of the title character. Fanning returned to portray Aurora in Maleficent: Mistress of Evil (2019), which is set five years later.

Sleeping Beauty Castle is an attraction at Disneyland. Le Château de la Belle au Bois Dormant (French for "The Castle of the Beauty in the Sleeping Forest", but known more roughly in English as "Sleeping Beauty Castle") was built at Disneyland Park Paris. The castle was replaced by the Castle of Magical Dreams in Hong Kong Disneyland; however, the new castle still pays tribute to Aurora and the other Disney Princesses. Along with Cinderella Castle, the castle is a main symbol of the Walt Disney Company.

== Development ==
=== Conception and writing ===
Filmmaker Walt Disney had long been struggling to adapt the fairy tale "Sleeping Beauty" into a full-length animated film for several years, intending to base the project on both Charles Perrault and the Brothers Grimm's versions of the story. Disney was considering abandoning work on the film altogether until singer Mary Costa was discovered, the casting of whom as the film's heroine finally allowed the project to graduate from development to production. At the time Aurora was conceived, there had only been two prior Disney princesses: Snow White and Cinderella, the heroines of Disney's Snow White and the Seven Dwarfs (1937) and Cinderella (1950), respectively. Disney wanted his third princess to be as different from Snow White as possible, but several strong similarities remain between the two characters and their respective stories. Gary Susman of Moviefone observed that both films feature "an evil witch jealous of a young and beautiful princess, the princess hiding out in a woodland cottage with a group of comic-relief caretakers ... and the witch putting the princess into a deathlike sleep, from which only true love's kiss can awaken her."

In the original fairy tale, the princess actually sleeps for 100 years before she is finally awakened by the prince's kiss; this detail was adjusted for the film in favor of having Prince Phillip introduced earlier, and thus Aurora is awakened much sooner. In the Grimm version, the princess is destined to prick her finger at the age of 15, while Disney decided to age the character by one year. Tchaikovsky named the princess "Aurora" in his ballet, whereas "Briar Rose" is the name of the character from the Brothers Grimm fairy tale. Disney utilized both names in the film, with the princess's birth name being Aurora, and her assumed name while living as a peasant being Briar Rose. Aurora was the last princess in whose conception Walt Disney himself was directly involved prior to his death.

=== Voice ===
Aurora is voiced by American singer Mary Costa, who was 22 years old when she was cast as the character in 1952. Costa had grown up a fan of Disney films, the first of which she saw was Snow White and the Seven Dwarfs. As a child, Costa adored the film so much that she would imitate Snow White by parading around her house wearing a bath towel as a makeshift cape. Costa described herself garnering the role of Aurora as simply "being in the right place at the right time." The filmmakers had long struggled to cast Aurora, having been searching for the right voice for the character for three years. Disney himself had been considering to shelving the project unless a suitable voice actress was found, insisting that the same performer provide both the character's speaking and singing voices. Costa was attending a dinner party for the entertainment industry, to which she had been invited by a friend who was hoping to introduce her to some influential people, where she performed the popular standard "When I Fall in Love". The performance was heard by film composer Walter Schumann who, impressed by her vocals, approached Costa about possibly voicing Aurora and inviting her to audition the following morning. Despite doubting that she would be cast, Costa agreed to audition mostly because she wanted to meet Walt Disney. Upon arriving at the studio the next day, composer George Bruns welcomed Costa by asking her to perform a bird call, which she did successfully. However, being from Knoxville, Tennessee, Costa's strong southern accent nearly prevented her from being cast until she proved that she could sustain a fake British accent for the entire film. The filmmakers likened the situation to English actress Vivien Leigh successfully feigning a southern accent for her role as Scarlet O'Hara in the film Gone With the Wind (1939). Within hours of her audition, Walt Disney himself contacted Costa via telephone to offer her the job, which she immediately accepted. Aurora became Costa's first major film role.

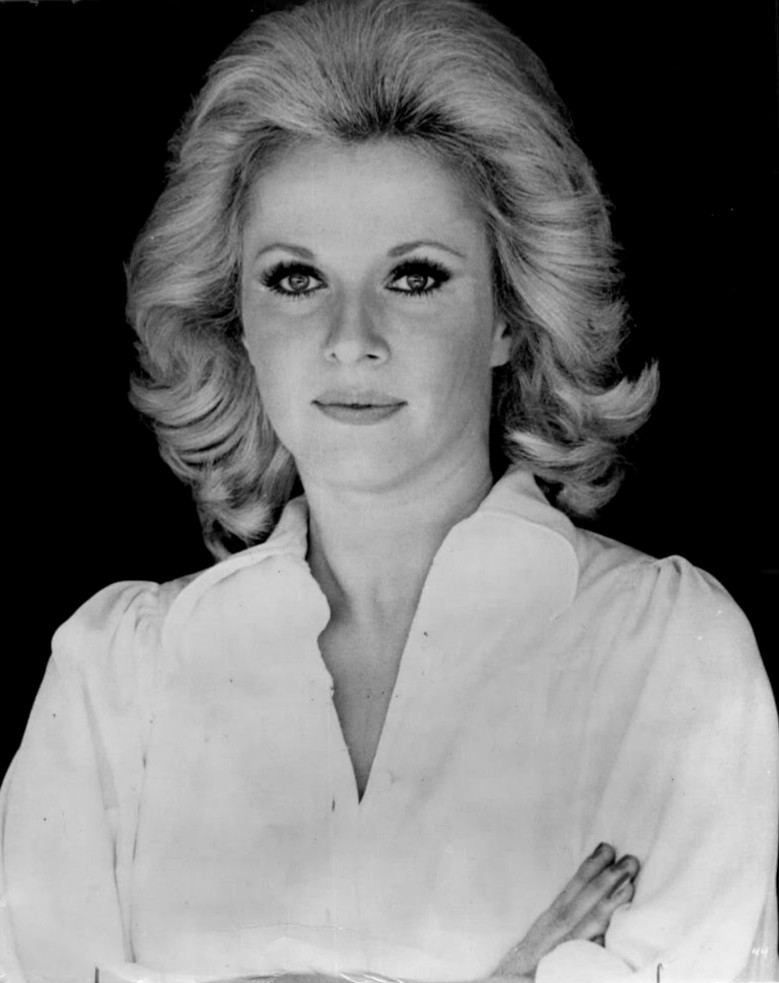
Aurora is voiced by American singer Mary Costa, who feigned a British accent for the role.

Costa communicated with Walt Disney at least twice a week for nine months, but almost exclusively via telephone because the producer feared that her personality or physical appearance would influence his vision of Aurora if they were to meet in person too soon. They first met when Costa was recording "Once Upon a Dream", Walt's favorite song in the film. When Costa asked Walt why he decided to cast her as Aurora out of all the actresses who auditioned, the producer explained that it was because her singing voice sounded "like an extension of speech." Walt advised Costa to "paint with [her] voice", as well as refuse to let anyone demonstrate her lines for her. Walt also instructed Costa to avoid catching a cold, eat a warm meal two hours prior to her recording sessions, exercise her vocal cords, and get nine hours of sleep every night. Walt and Costa developed a special father-daughter relationship. Aurora's supervising animator Marc Davis would often observe and sketch Costa while she worked in order to incorporate her mannerisms into the character. Costa worked closely with actresses Verna Felton, Barbara Jo Allen and Barbara Luddy, the voices of Flora, Fauna and Merryweather, respectively, with whom she became good friends, while declaring the utmost respect for actress Eleanor Audley, voice of Maleficent. She also recorded with actor Bill Shirley, voice of Prince Phillip, admitting to having had a crush on him. Costa cites the scene in which Aurora and Phillip meet as her favorite. Schumann, the composer responsible for discovering Costa, eventually departed the project due to creative differences with Disney, and ultimately died before the film was completed.

Costa's singing voice is a combination of classical and pop singing. Aurora's songs were recorded within the first year of production. Costa would practice her songs live with the orchestra before recording them. After working on the film for three years, Costa finally finished recording in 1955, long before the film was completed; it would take the animators another several years to complete the footage to accompany Costa's vocals and dialogue. Costa would often return to the studio to re-record lines as the story changed and evolved, which she described as a "painstaking" process. However, with only 18 spoken lines, Aurora speaks less than any other main character in a full-length Disney animated feature—aside from Dumbo, who is completely silent—and has absolutely no dialogue once she is awakened from her deep sleep. Ultimately, Costa's performance in Sleeping Beauty—and Walt Disney himself—inspired her to pursue a full-time career as a professional opera singer, advising her "Mary, just remember the three Ds... Dedication, Determination, and Discipline, and you'll achieve your Dreams!". Costa's salary was $250 per week.

=== Personality and design ===
Aurora's blurb on the Disney Princess website once cited the character as "gentle and loving". Walt Disney introduced Aurora to Costa as "a very layered character", describing her as "different. She's calm, yet she's playful. She has a sense of humor, and she has an imagination." Despite popular opinion that Aurora is a very passive character, Costa believes that the princess is actually "very strong", citing her urge to defy her guardians as an example of her strength, while referring to the character as "a beautiful personification of femininity." Raised exclusively by three women in a very sheltered environment, Aurora had never been exposed to a man prior to meeting Phillip. Costa believes that, because of this, Aurora is "innately romantic" as opposed to simply lonely, explaining, there "was a certain part of her that maybe she didn't realize that was just so romantic and maybe expecting something that she didn't even know what", and credits the fact that she was raised by three older women as opposed to her parents with making her "a little bit older, and yet, she ... had this young outreaching spirit." A very loving character, Aurora enjoyed her lonely life as much as she did because she had never experienced anything else. Additionally, the character's close companionship with woodland creatures is used to demonstrate that she is a loving individual.

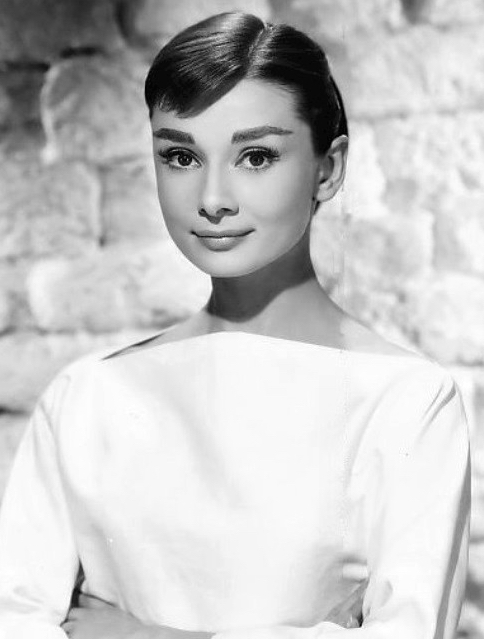
The slender features of British actress Audrey Hepburn inspired Aurora's physique.

Walt Disney challenged his animators to make the film's characters appear "as real as possible". Animator Marc Davis was the supervising animator for Aurora, responsible for animating the character's most important scenes who also animated the film's antagonist Maleficent. By the time he started working on Sleeping Beauty, Davis' prior work experience had already established him as "one of Walt Disney's go-to animators for pretty girls," having previously animated Snow White and Cinderella, as well as Alice from Alice in Wonderland (1951) and Tinker Bell from Peter Pan (1953). Although heroines are among the most difficult characters to animate, Davis' knowledge of the human body and anatomy "brought these iconic female characters to life and made them believable", according to The Walt Disney Family Museum. While other Sleeping Beauty animators struggled to adapt to artistic director Eyvind Earle's unprecedented preference for detailed backgrounds, Davis himself rather embraced this new style. Collaborating with character designer Tom Oreb on Aurora, Davis "crafted a leading lady of elegance", while Oreb drew vertical lines into the pleats of Briar Rose's skirt and incorporated two-dimensional swirls into her hair. With a dignified, angular shape that complemented Earle's vertical and horizontal backgrounds, the princess was "more refined" than preceding Disney heroines, and thus required much more attention to detail than any animated character before her. Quality control animator Iwao Takamoto described working on Aurora as "a laborious job ... because the drawings were so refined", and ultimately limited in-betweeners such as himself to completing only seven drawings per day. With an artistry "characterized by a sense of style", Davis incorporated Art Nouveau and Art Deco into Aurora's long, golden curls. The character also has violet eyes, Disney's first princess to have eyes that are this color. Notably, Davis animated Aurora throughout the entire film as opposed to eventually being replaced by another animator which, according to Costa, would have altered the appearance of the character for the worse. Aurora's refined features complement those of her nemesis Maleficent, who is similarly as refined and "alluring" but in a more "manipulative manner." Both characters were animated by Davis.

Walt Disney strongly encouraged Costa to work closely with Davis while he animated Aurora so that she could learn as much as possible about her character and familiarize herself with "all aspects of her." Drawing Aurora to resemble her voice actress, Davis incorporated Costa's habit of gesturing with her hands while speaking and singing into the character's design, and defended the singer's performance when it was incorrectly referred to a voice-over by a fan, explaining that Costa's voice was "the ocean of sound upon which we animated." Davis and Costa eventually became close friends. Actress and dancer Helene Stanley served as the live-action model for Aurora, providing visual reference for the animators. The performer was recruited due to the high degree of realism required to animate Aurora. Stanley's costume was designed by costume designer Alice Estes at the behest of Davis, then a student of the animator at Chouinard Art Institute. To complement the "tapestry pattern" of the film's backgrounds, Estes agreed to design the dress to "move like [the tapestry] was animated." Estes and Davis eventually got married. Meanwhile, British actress Audrey Hepburn served as Oreb's inspiration for Aurora's body type, from whom they borrowed the princess' "elegant, slender features". The studio disagreed about whether Aurora's gown should be pink or blue, a conflict that was written into the film in the form of an argument between Flora and Merryweather. Aurora has a total of only 18 minutes of screen time.

== International versions ==
When Sleeping Beauty was released in 1959, a dubbing process was started which, in the space of one year, brought the film to number 10 dubbings by 1960. Along the years, Disney's expanded its market to new countries, having the film dubbed into a constantly growing number of dubbings, as well as a starting massive re-dubbing process which regarded many of the oldest dubbings. To this date, only five of the 10 dubbings initially released are still in use and were never redubbed. To this date, the animated film numbers a total of 34 dubbings currently in use in as many languages, and 9 more versions which were later substituted by newer dubbings.

Originally, in the Danish and the first Latin American Spanish dubbings, Aurora's speaking voices, Ellen Winther and Estrellita Díaz respectively, were meant to sing the princess' songs as well. But while Winther was replaced by Inge Stauss because the Danish directors thought that her voice didn't suit Aurora's singing well enough, Díaz didn't get to sing because she died short after having recorded her spoken lines, without having recorded the songs.

Highlighted versions were released between 1959 and 1960
Highlighted versions are a redubbing of an older dubbing

Aurora's dubbers worldwide
Language	Speaking	Singing
Arabic	رشا طلعت (Rasha Talaat)	
Bulgarian	Вилма Карталска (Vilma Kartalska)	Емилия Цветкова (Emilia Tsvetkova)
Cantonese Chinese	雷碧娜 (Lui Bik-Na)	陈美凤 (May Chan)
Cantonese Chinese	张佩德 (Jeung Pooi-Dak)	陈美凤 (May Chan)
Croatian	Maja Posavec	Renata Sabljak
Czech	Iveta Dufková	
Danish	Ellen Winther	Inge Stauss
Dutch	Maria de Booy	Christine Spierenburg
Dutch	Joke de Kruijf	
English	Mary Costa	
Finnish	Mervi Hiltunen	Päivi Ristimäki
French	Irène Valois	Huguette Boulangeot
French	Jeanine Forney	Danielle Licari
German	Maria Milde	
Greek	Αγγελική Δημητρακοπούλου (Aggelikí Dimitrakopoúlou)	
Hebrew	לימור שפירא (Limor Shapira)	
Hindi	—N/a	—N/a
Hungarian	Tiboldi Mária	
Hungarian	Bertalan Ági	Kertesi Ingrid
Icelandic	Þórunn Lárusdóttir	
Indonesian	—N/a	—N/a
Indonesian	Esty Rohmiati	
Italian	Maria Pia Di Meo	Tina Centi
Japanese	高田敏江 (Takada Toshie)	牧三都子 (Maki Satoko)
Japanese	すずきまゆみ (Suzuki Mayumi)	
Korean	함수정 (Ham Su-Jung)	홍화진 (Hong Hwa-Jin)
Malay	—N/a	—N/a
Mandarin Chinese	王儷樺 (Wáng Lì-Huà)	趙粟 (Zhào Sù)
Norwegian	Liv Ragnhild Sømme Tomeberg	
Polish	Maria Broniewska	Bogna Sokorska
Polish	Małgorzata Długosz	
Portuguese (Brazil)	Maria Alice Barreto	Maria Norma Moraes Illner
Portuguese (European)	Carla Garcia	Ana Paula Almeida
Romanian	Mediana Vlad	
Russian	Карина Сербина (Karina Serbina)	
Spanish	Estrellita Díaz	Lupita Pérez Arias
Spanish	Laura Ayala	Brenda Ruiz
Swedish	Liz-Beth Olsson	
Swedish	Birgitta Larsson	
Thai	จันทร์จิรา นิ่มพิทักษ์พงศ์ (Chanjira Nimpitakpong)	
Turkish	Tülay Uyar	
Ukrainian	Дарина Муращенко (Daryna Murashchenko)	
Vietnamese	TBA	TBA

== Characterization and themes ==
Aurora is a member of a trifecta known as the "Golden Era" of Disney heroines. Alongside her two predecessors Snow White and Cinderella, Aurora is one of the three original Disney princesses.

By default, Aurora is usually considered to be the film's main character. Leigh Butler of Tor.com argues that the role of "protagonist" rightfully belongs to the three good fairies because they "make all the critical decisions in the film, the ones which drive the action", while Aurora acts as little more than a pawn. Butler expounded that Aurora "never grows as a character during the course of the film; she has no agency at all, in fact. She doesn't act; she is acted upon. So she is definitely not the hero of the story." Helping Writers Become Authors' K. M. Weiland agreed, writing, "Sleeping Beauty has no arc. Prince Phillip has no arc. And, even more importantly, neither of them are present from start to finish in the story. Without the fairies to hold this thing together, the plot would have lacked any kind of impetus or cohesion." Upon initial viewing of Sleeping Beauty, a writer for Anibundel originally dismissed Aurora as "the ultimate Disney princess in the most negative and passive sense of the stereotype ... playing no part whatsoever in her own outcome." However, in retrospect, the author's opinion eventually evolved upon subsequent viewings: "Although Aurora has little to do with her own conclusion, it's not a mark of her being a non-person. Instead it reflects how sometimes bad things just happen which we have no control over, a difficult but important lesson." Anibundel does agree that although Aurora is Sleeping Beauty's title character, she can hardly be considered the film's protagonist, believing instead that the film actually lacks one completely. Meanwhile, the author dubbed Aurora the film's most sympathetic character because she has "thoughts, feelings, aspirations, and emotions," elaborating, "While most characters ... are overly focused on the plot and reacting to events, Briar Rose is unaware of the other events so we get to see a more authentic everyday side of her." In his book Multiculturalism and the Mouse: Race and Sex in Disney Entertainment, author Douglas Brode wrote that the fairies' raising of Aurora mirrors "precisely that sort of women's commune numerous feminists experimented with throughout the seventies."

Writing for Durham College's The Water Buffalo, Michelle Munro observed that the first five Disney Princesses share physical and personality traits, namely their white skin, naivety, kindness and compassion, "showing viewers what Disney believed a princess should look and act like" at that time. Munro concluded that Aurora specifically can appear both spoiled and childish in demeanor at times. Bailey Cavender of The Silver Petticoat Review believes that the character's appearance and style is reminiscent of the Gibson Girl, a popular character created and designed by graphic artist Charles Dana Gibson, who embodied the idea that "physical beauty was a measure of fitness, character, and Americanness". According to Cavender, Aurora's beauty was considered to be "ideal" for women at the time her film was released, embodying the "classic standards of beauty." In his book Debating Disney: Pedagogical Perspectives on Commercial Cinema, Douglas Brode agreed that Aurora is "a model of modern (1950s) female glamour", comparing her long blonde hair to that of actress Brigitte Bardot while likening her gown to the work of fashion designer Christian Dior. According to The Dissolve's Noel Murray, Aurora's story is a metaphor about a "young woman being cautioned to avoid penetration." Similarly, Carrie R. Wheadon, writing for Common Sense Media, interpreted Aurora's arousal by a handsome prince as being symbolic of a young woman's "transition to adulthood and sexual awakening." According to Multiculturalism and the Mouse: Race and Sex in Disney Entertainment author Douglas Brode, Aurora is "torn between childlike loyalties and adult instincts", while The Disney Middle Ages: A Fairy-Tale and Fantasy Past author Tison Pugh believes that Aurora's first encounter with Prince Phillip "tips her from fantasy into reality, from childhood into womanhood."

== Appearances ==
=== Sleeping Beauty ===
Aurora debuted in Sleeping Beauty (1959) as the only daughter of King Stefan and Queen Leah. Angered at not receiving an invitation to her christening, an evil fairy, Maleficent, places a curse on Aurora; before the sun sets on Aurora's 16th birthday, Aurora will prick her finger on a spinning wheel's spindle and die. Fortunately, one of the three good fairies, Merryweather, alters the curse so if Aurora pricked her finger, she would not die, but be put to sleep until she is awakened by a kiss from her true love. Merryweather and the other two fairies, Flora and Fauna, take extra precautions by raising the princess in a secluded cottage under the alias/nickname Briar Rose to protect her from Maleficent until her sixteenth birthday arrives. Years later, a 16-year-old Aurora meets a handsome man in the forest. Unaware that he is actually a prince named Phillip, to whom she has been betrothed since infancy, the two fall in love and agree to meet again. However, the fairies finally reveal Aurora's true identity to her and thus forbid her from seeing him because they plan on returning the heartbroken princess to her parents. While Aurora is left alone at the castle, Maleficent appears as a glowing green ball of light that calls to Aurora, and hypnotically beckons Aurora to a tower room, where she is lured to prick her finger on a spinning wheel's spindle (which is really Maleficent herself), which puts Aurora in a deep sleep. After Maleficent reveals herself and the sleeping Aurora to the fairies, the fairies place Aurora on a bed in the highest tower to sleep peacefully and put the entire kingdom to sleep until the spell is broken. Meanwhile, Maleficent has captured Phillip, whom the fairies release upon realizing that he is in fact the same man Aurora met in the forest earlier that day. Along with everyone else in the kingdom, Aurora is successfully awakened by Phillip's kiss and is finally reunited with her parents.

=== Disney Princess Enchanted Tales: Follow Your Dreams ===
In Disney Princess Enchanted Tales: Follow Your Dreams (2007), Aurora, voiced by actress Erin Torpey, stars in the segment "Keys to the Kingdom", in which her parents leave her responsible for running the kingdom in their two-day absence with assistance of their majordomo, Lord Duke. Declining assistance from the fairies, they give her her own wand instead should she need help. At first reluctant to use it because she is determined to accomplish everything on her own, Aurora eventually succumbs when her duties prove overwhelming. However, her inexperience with magic leads to several consequences, which forces Lord Duke into warning Stefan, Leah, King Hubert, and Prince Phillip, who were all coming back from a royal conference, about the giant chickens, green pigs, and cows. She is then forced to solve without magic before the others came in the throne room. She hosts a banquet for her parents, King Hubert, Prince Phillip, Lord Duke, Flora, Fauna, and Merryweather.

=== Maleficent film series ===
==== Maleficent ====
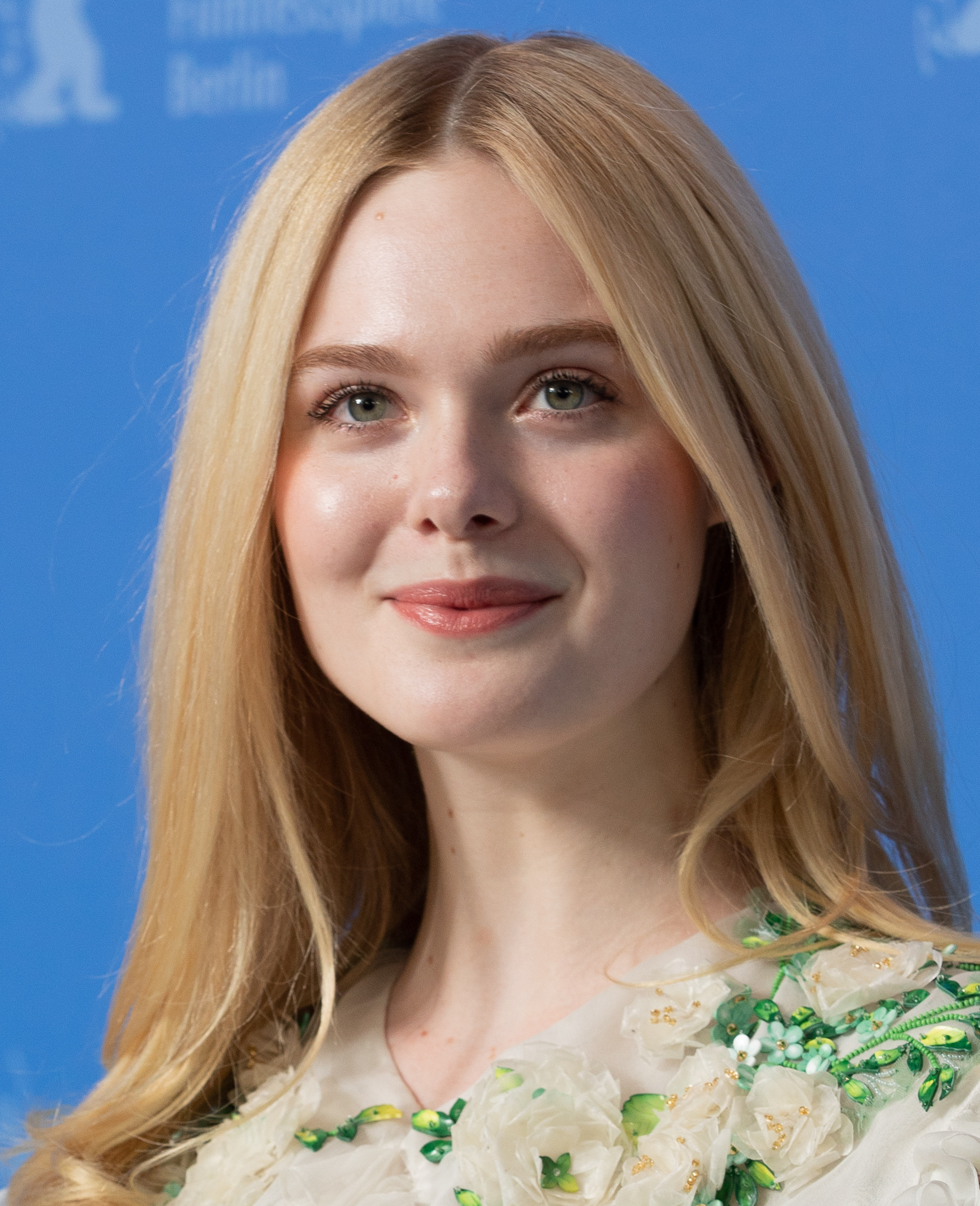
American actress Elle Fanning played Aurora in Maleficent and its sequel.

In Maleficent (2014), a live-action re-imagining of the animated film, the Sleeping Beauty story is retold from the villain's perspective. Here, Aurora is portrayed by Elle Fanning, while Janet McTeer portrays a narrator who turns out to be Aurora as an elderly woman. As an infant, the princess is cursed by Maleficent in order to avenge a years-old betrayal by King Stefan, Aurora's father. Three quarrelsome pixies are charged with raising the princess, but their glaring ineptitude threatens to kill Aurora long before her 16th birthday. Maleficent's pity for the princess overcomes her rage toward Stefan; along with her minion Diaval, Maleficent herself brings up Aurora albeit covertly. When the young princess ultimately encounters Maleficent for the first time, she is touched by Aurora's affectionate nature; the girl, who has never known her biological parents, regards Maleficent as her fairy godmother. When Aurora pricks her finger on a deformed spinning wheel's spindle and falls asleep, despite Maleficent's efforts to revoke it, she herself (rather than Phillip) breaks the spell with a remorseful kiss on Aurora's brow. Aurora then saves Maleficent from her royal father by returning Maleficent's wings to her. The princess is subsequently crowned queen of both her own human kingdom and the fairy kingdom known as the Moors. Fanning's performance was generally well received by critics.

==== Maleficent: Mistress of Evil ====
Fanning reprises the role in the sequel, Maleficent: Mistress of Evil (2019). Five years have passed since Aurora became Queen of the Moors. One day Phillip finally asks for her hand in marriage, which she gladly accepts. Despite Maleficent initially not accepting Phillip's blessing, she agrees to go have dinner at the castle in Ulstead, Phillip's kingdom, to meet Aurora's future in-laws. Maleficent is then wrongfully blamed for cursing Phillip's father, King John, and Aurora refuses to go back home with her. Eventually, Aurora begins to miss her godmother as well as her life in the Moors. She soon discovers that it was Phillip's mother, Queen Ingrith, who cursed the king and that a trap is being set to kill the creatures of the Moors. Aurora and Phillip help Maleficent stop the war against Queen Ingrith, and they are finally married. Critics praised Fanning's performance in the sequel for having, "quite a bit spunk and fight," as well as "useful," and "charming as ever."

=== Once Upon a Time ===
An alternate version of Aurora appears as a recurring character in the fantasy television series Once Upon a Time, portrayed by Sarah Bolger.

=== Sofia the First ===
Aurora made a guest appearance in a Sofia the First episode "Holiday in Enchancia", called on by the mystical amulet of Avalor to assist young Princess Sofia in finding her missing stepfather, King Roland II. She assured Sofia that she could rely on her animal friends' to help just as she had long ago.

It was announced in April 2026 that Aurora will appear in the sequel series to Sofia the First, entitled Sofia the First: Royal Magic, with Aurora providing "wisdom and guidance" with the protagonist, Sofia.

=== Ralph Breaks the Internet ===
Aurora, alongside other Disney Princesses, appeared in the film Ralph Breaks the Internet, as was announced at the 2017 D23 Expo.

=== Once Upon a Studio ===
Aurora appeared in the short film Once Upon a Studio standing with Prince Phillip in the group photo.

=== Miscellaneous ===
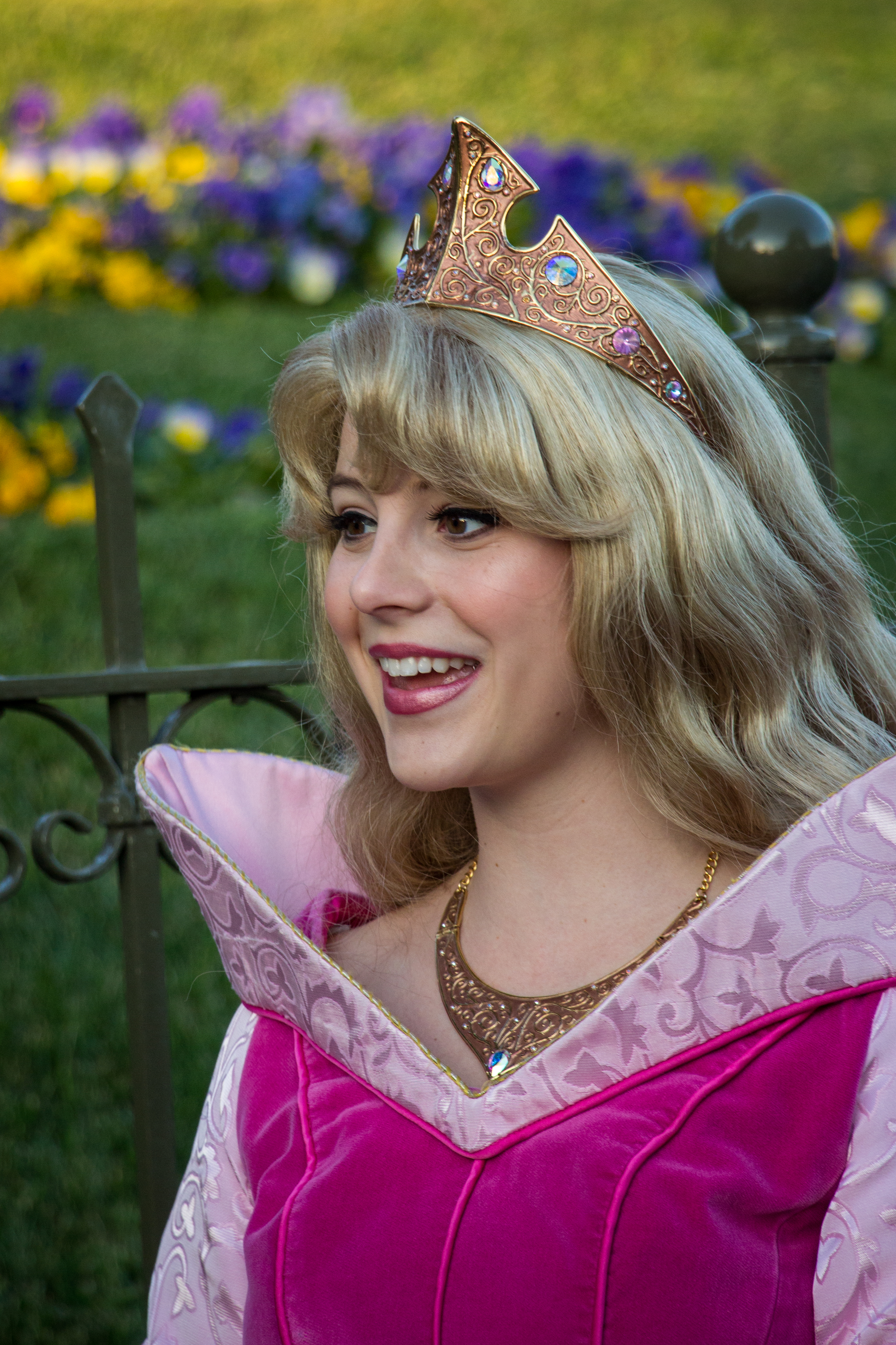
Aurora, as she appears in the Disney Parks

Aurora appears as a non-player character in the Kingdom Hearts video game series, depicted as one of the seven Princesses of Heart. Aurora also appears in the prequel Kingdom Hearts Birth by Sleep (2010), which retells the story of the original film. Aurora appears in Kinect Disneyland Adventures (2011), asking players to collect items various items, including songs performed by birds.

Performers dressed as Aurora make "fairly regular" appearances throughout several popular locations at the Walt Disney Parks and Resorts, specifically Walt Disney World's Epcot France Pavilion, Cinderella's Royal Table, Disney Dreams Come True Parade, and Princess Fairytale Hall in the Magic Kingdom, Fantasyland's Princess Meet 'n' Greet at Disneyland California, Fantasyland's Princess Pavilion and Auberge de Cendrillon at Disneyland Paris, Fantasyland and World Bazaar at Tokyo Disneyland, and the Wishing Well at Hong Kong Disneyland.

Aurora appears as a playable character in the video game Disney Magic Kingdoms.

=== Books ===
==== Mistress of All Evil: A Tale of the Dark Fairy ====
Aurora appears in the fourth book of Serena Valentino's Villains series. In the book she has been cursed by Maleficent to remain in slumber and is trapped in the realm of mirrors with the Odd Sisters, who constantly torment her during the course of the book. It is revealed during the course of the novel that Aurora is actually the daughter of Maleficent, who was created by the Odd Sisters from the remaining best parts of Maleficent. However rather than a feeling of love for her, Maleficent only feels a powerful urge to protect her from developing powers, which will manifest on her sixteenth birthday similar to Maleficent, hence the Sleeping Curse. After Maleficent dies, Circe is able to bind Aurora's powers and wake her from her slumber.

==== Once Upon A Dream: A Twisted Tale ====
In the second book of A Twisted Tale, written by Liz Braswell, the question is asked What if the Sleeping Beauty never woke up? Aurora is trapped in a dream world of Maleficent's design, and when Phillip tries to awaken her with a kiss, he becomes trapped in the dream world as well. Aurora eventually becomes a warrior in her own right and rises up against Maleficent to break herself out of the Dream World.

== Trademark ==
The Walt Disney Company currently has a trademark with the US Patent and Trademark Office, filed March 13, 2007, for the name "Princess Aurora" that covers production and distribution of motion picture films; production of television programs; production of sound and video recordings. This has caused some controversy because "Princess Aurora" is the name of the lead character in The Sleeping Beauty ballet, from where Disney acquired the name and some of the music for its animated film, and which is performed live on stage and sometimes television and often sold later as a recorded performance on video. The trademark was granted on January 17, 2012.

== Reception and legacy ==
Initial critical response towards Aurora was generally unfavorable, with film critics complaining about Aurora's passivity and overall similarity to Snow White. During the 1950s, Disney received "harsh criticism" for depicting both Cinderella and Aurora as "naïve and malleable" characters, and failing to acknowledge the ways in which women's roles in society had evolved since Snow White's debut in 1937. Critics agree that Aurora represents "the classic damsel in distress" by being depicted as a beautiful young woman who is rescued by a stranger. Bosley Crowther of The New York Times felt that the character was too similar to Snow White, writing, "The princess looks so much like Snow White they could be a couple of Miss Rheingolds separated by three or four years." Time Out dismissed Aurora as a "delicate" and "vapid" character. Bustle's Mary Grace Garis wrote that the character "suffers from having very little definable personality and ... serious Damsel-in-Distress syndrome". Sonia Saraiya of Jezebel echoed this sentiment, criticizing Aurora for lacking "interesting qualities"; Saraiya also ranked Aurora Disney's least feminist princess. Similarly, Bustle also ranked Aurora the least feminist Disney Princess, with author Chelsea Mize expounding, "Aurora literally sleeps for like three quarters of the movie ... Aurora just straight-up has no agency, and really isn't doing much in the way of feminine progress." Dismissing the character as "barely more than a cipher", Leigh Butler of Tor.com panned Aurora as "a Barbie doll knockoff who does nothing the whole film but sing wistfully about Finding Her Man, before becoming the ultimate passive Damsel in Distress". However, Butler went on to defend the character somewhat, writing, "Aurora's cipher-ness in Sleeping Beauty would be infuriating if she were the only female character in it, but the presence of the Fairies and Maleficent allow her to be what she is without it being a subconscious statement on what all women are." Similarly, Refinery29 ranked Aurora the fourth most feminist Disney Princess because "Her aunts have essentially raised her in a place where women run the game."

Sleeping Beauty herself is barely more than a cipher. Princess Aurora has virtually no character at all in the film other than to be an ideal—and, I might add, an ideal only achieved with the magical fairy tale equivalent of surgical enhancement ... Aurora in the film is not a person, per se; she is the prize that the other characters fight over. She is an object, really, and that is not feminist at all.

— Tor.com's Leigh Butler on Aurora's lack of character and feminism.

Aurora was Disney's last princess created before Walt Disney's death in 1966. When Sleeping Beauty was first released in 1959, the film performed poorly at the box office while failing to impress critics. In response, the studio decided to avoid adapting fairy tales into feature-length animated films for several years; Aurora would remain Disney's last princess until The Little Mermaid's Ariel debuted in 1989, 30 years later. Mic's Melissa Hugel believes that the negative reception instigated by Aurora's passive role as a woman in Sleeping Beauty also contributed to this hiatus, earning the character a reputation as one of Disney's worst princesses. Meanwhile, David Nusair of About.com attributes the film's failure with "the familiarity of its storyline, as the film boasts many of the elements contained within both of its predecessors – including the revelation that Princess Aurora can only be awakened from her deep slumber by a kiss from her one true love" similar to Snow White. Hollywood.com ranked Sleeping Beauty Disney's worst princess film because its main character remains asleep for the majority of it. At one point, the name "Aurora" became a popular baby name, with parents often naming their daughters after the character. Still, "Aurora has become an oft-forgotten princess" who is not as prominently featured in Disney merchandise and her popularity pales in comparison to that of Cinderella, Ariel, and Snow White. While creating the Disney Princess franchise, Disney Consumer Products decided that Aurora should be marketed wearing the pink version of her dress in order to further distinguish her from Cinderella, who also wears blue. BuzzFeed readers voted Aurora their sixth favorite Disney Princess, who garnered 7% of the 9,554 votes. Time reported that Aurora was the seventh best-selling Disney Princess on eBay in 2014, having sold $215,856 in merchandise that year. However, Seventeen argues that Aurora is one of Disney's most famous princess[es]".

Media publications often tend to place Aurora towards the end of their Disney Princess rankings. Seventeen ranked Aurora last on their "Definitive Ranking Of Disney Princesses" list. Similarly, BuzzFeed also ranked Aurora last. Moviepilot placed Aurora last on the website's "All of the Disney Princess Ranked from Worst to Best" ranking, with author Kristin Lai dismissing the character as "a snooze." Meanwhile, MTV ranked Aurora 12th on the website's "Ultimate Ranking Of The Best Disney Princesses Of All Time". Similarly, E! also ranked Aurora 12th, with author John Boone elaborating, "She's not a bad princess, per se. She might actually be the prettiest of all the princesses ... But she's asleep half the movie! Pretty...but so, so boring." Zimbio ranked Aurora the second worst Disney Princess, while BuzzFeed ranked the character one of Disney's least intelligent princesses, with author Leonora Epstein dismissing Aurora as the "equivalent to the child who puts his finger in a socket when expressly told not to." However, the character has garnered recognition for her beauty and fashion, with Stylist extolling Aurora's "blowout" as "the ultimate hairstyle when it comes to being a princess" while ranking it among Disney's "Best beauty looks", and Bustle dubbing her "the hottest Disney Princess". Entertainment Weekly ranked Aurora's hair the second best of all the Disney Princesses, with author Annie Barrett describing it as "aspirational". Oh My Disney ranked the pink and blue versions of Aurora's dress 15th and 16th on their countdown of every Disney Princess outfit, voicing their preference for the character in blue. Marie Claire ranked Aurora's outfits among "The 20 Greatest Movie Dresses of All Time", writing, "Of all the Disney princesses, Sleeping Beauty's Aurora had a fashionable edge" potentially worthy of being imitated by singers Katy Perry and Nicki Minaj. Aurora was ranked first on Moviepilot's "Which Outfit is Fairest of Them All? 13 Disney Divas Ranked" list. Author Mikayla Sloan enthused that "The lines of Aurora's dress are flawless and her shoulders are set off beautifully" while "Her hair is effortlessly wavy and her accessories accentuate her features perfectly." According to Bustle, the character is the third most stylish Disney Princess, while E! believes that Aurora owns the sixth greatest Disney Princess wardrobe, voicing their preference for the character in pink. BuzzFeed ranked Aurora's ballgown 11th on their "Definitive Ranking Of 72 Disney Princess Outfits". According to Seventeen, the character underwent the fifth greatest Disney Princess makeover. On Cosmopolitan's list of "the 14 Hottest Disney Princesses", Aurora was ranked 12th, with author Frank Kobola dismissing the character as "a snoozefest" and comparing her to "that girl in college who was always taking naps".

Costa has garnered widespread acclaim for her performance as Aurora. BuzzFeed ranked Aurora ninth on the website's ranking of Disney Princess singing voices, with author Kelcie Willis awarding it "Extra props for bringing operatic vocals to Disney." Variety complimented Costa's "rich and expressive" performance, praising the singer for providing Aurora with both "substance and strength". John Clark of SFGate credited Costa's vocals with "manag[ing] to make an enchanting impression in just a few onscreen minutes without being pushy or saccharine." Meanwhile, Artistdirect's Rick Florino wrote that the singer "brought a pure and honest vibrancy to the film." Additionally, Sleeping Beauty served as Costa's first singing job, prior to which she had had little professional singing experience. The role has since had a profound impact on Costa's career, allowing her to successfully transition from animated to operatic roles. Costa credits Walt Disney and Sleeping Beauty with instilling a work ethic in her, which she maintained throughout her entire career. Costa has achieved great success as an opera singer; The New York Times hailed her as "one of the most beautiful women to grace the operatic stage", while Paul MacInnes of The Guardian referred to her as "One of America's finest sopranos". First Lady Jacqueline Kennedy personally requested that Costa perform at the memorial service of her late husband, United States President John F. Kennedy. Despite her success elsewhere, Costa continues to hold voicing Aurora in high regard as her greatest accomplishment because the role "keeps [her] close to young people." Costa was officially recognized as a Disney Legend in 1999, and continues to make promotional appearances for Disney. In 1997, Costa hosted a theatrical screening of Sleeping Beauty in her hometown of Knoxville, Tennessee to commemorate the film's home video release. In 1989, Costa sued Disney for royalties owed since the film's 1986 home video release, claiming that her contract with the studio prevented them from producing "phonograph recordings or transcriptions for sale to the public" without her permission, although Disney claimed that the video tapes are simply versions of the film. The case was settled out-of-court in favor of Costa for an undisclosed sum, provided she relinquish all future rights. Costa continued responding to all fan letters for nearly 60 years after the film's original release, until she found that she had become too elderly to continue responding at the age of 86 in 2016; she continues to meet fans and sign autographs at conventions. In 2020, following her 90th birthday, Costa then asked people to stop sending her any fan-mail in general, but she once again thanked them for their continued love and support over the years.
