= Flora, Fauna, and Merryweather =

Disney's Sleeping Beauty characters

- From left to right: Fauna, Flora, and Merryweather
- First appearance: Sleeping Beauty (1959)
- Voiced by: Flora: Verna Felton (Sleeping Beauty); Tress MacNeille (House of Mouse); Barbara Dirikson (other appearances); Susanne Blakeslee (Sorcerers of the Magic Kingdom); Fauna: Barbara Jo Allen (Sleeping Beauty); Russi Taylor (other appearances); Merryweather: Barbara Luddy (Sleeping Beauty); Tress MacNeille (other appearances)

In-universe information
- Species: Fairies
- Gender: Females
- Occupation: Fairy godmothers
- Relatives: Princess Aurora (adoptive niece; goddaughter)

Flora, Fauna, and Merryweather are the three good fairies in Walt Disney's 1959 film Sleeping Beauty. They are characterized as Princess Aurora's fairy godmothers and guardians, who appear at baby Aurora's christening to present their gifts to her. The three were voiced by Verna Felton, Barbara Jo Allen, and Barbara Luddy, respectively. In Disney's live-action film Maleficent, and its sequel Maleficent: Mistress of Evil, the characters are renamed Knotgrass, Flittle, and Thistlewit, and portrayed by Imelda Staunton, Lesley Manville, and Juno Temple, respectively.

== Characteristics ==
Flora is the eldest fairy, dressed in a red gown, a red hat, and a red cape clipped with an orange square. She is the leader of the group. Her gift to Aurora is the gift of beauty. She created and possessed the powerful Sword of Truth and the invulnerable Shield of Virtue, which she can conjure whenever she sees fit. She is voiced by Verna Felton.

Fauna is the middle fairy, dressed in a green gown, a green hat, and a green cape clipped with a green triangle. She is shown to be a bit flighty, but is the kindest of the three and the most sensitive. Her gift to Aurora is the gift of song. She is voiced by Barbara Jo Allen.

Merryweather is the youngest fairy, dressed in a blue gown, a blue hat, and a blue cape clipped with a blue circle. She is the most aggressive of the fairies and is bolder and feistier than the other two. As Merryweather is about to give Aurora the gift of happiness, Maleficent appears and curses the princess to prick her finger on a spinning wheel's spindle and die before sunset on her sixteenth birthday. Soon after Maleficent disappears, however, Merryweather uses her gift to soften the curse so Aurora will not die if she was to prick her finger, but only sleep, and be awakened by true love's kiss. She is voiced by Barbara Luddy.

== Appearances ==
=== Sleeping Beauty ===
The fairies arrive at the christening of King Stefan and Queen Leah's newborn daughter, Princess Aurora. They tell Stefan and Leah that each of them will give a gift to the infant, the first two being beauty from Flora and song from Fauna. As Merryweather is about to give her gift, the evil fairy Maleficent arrives, angered over not being invited to the christening, to which Merryweather replies that she is "not wanted". Before leaving, Maleficent curses Aurora to die on her sixteenth birthday by pricking her finger on a spinning wheel's spindle. However, Merryweather uses her gift to curse so Aurora will not die from pricking her finger but only sleep and be awakened by true love's kiss.

The fairies plot against Maleficent, since they are not convinced that Stefan and Leah's response to the curse - destroying every spinning wheel in the kingdom - will be enough to stop her. They take Aurora into their custody with her parents' consent, ban themselves from using magic, and disguise themselves as human peasants. On Aurora's sixteenth birthday, Merryweather and Flora argue over the color of Aurora's dress. After Aurora returns from picking berries, she tells the fairies that in the forest, she met a gentleman for whom she has fallen. They reveal her true heritage as a princess and that she has been betrothed to Prince Phillip since her christening. However, the fairies do not know that the gentleman is Phillip and forbid Aurora from seeing him again.

The fairies later take Aurora to a room in the castle, conjure a crown for her to wear as a princess, then leave her alone to give her time to recover. Despite the fairies' efforts, Maleficent hypnotizes Aurora and conjures a spinning wheel and spindle which Aurora pricks her finger on, causing Aurora to fall into sleep. The fairies place the sleeping Aurora on a bed in the castle's topmost tower and put all the kingdom's citizens to sleep until Aurora awakens. While falling asleep, King Hubert tries to tell Stefan of his son being in love with a peasant maiden, which makes Flora realize that Phillip is the man Aurora has fallen in love with and the one fated to break the curse and save the kingdom. The fairies rescue Phillip from Maleficent's stronghold and give him the Sword of Truth and the Shield of Virtue, which he uses to kill Maleficent. The fairies lead Phillip to the tower room, where he awakens Aurora and the kingdom with true love's kiss. Afterward, they watch Aurora reunite with her parents and dance with Phillip.

=== Maleficent ===
A trio of pixies appear in Disney's live-action film Maleficent, and its sequel Maleficent: Mistress of Evil, named Knotgrass, Flittle, and Thistlewit. They are markedly different from their animated counterparts, with their role largely reduced to comic relief.

- Knotgrass (Imelda Staunton) wears pink and is the Flora equivalent: bossy and superior. She blesses Aurora with the gift of beauty.
- Flittle (Lesley Manville) wears blue (like Merryweather) but is the Fauna equivalent: naive and absent-minded. She blesses Aurora with the gift of happiness.
- Thistlewit (Juno Temple) wears green (like Fauna) but is the Merryweather equivalent: giddy and playful. She is interrupted by Maleficent before she could bless Aurora with the gift of finding true love.

=== Other appearances ===
==== Film ====
The fairies appear in Disney Princess Enchanted Tales: Follow Your Dreams during the "Keys to the Kingdom" segment. As King Stefan, Queen Leah, King Hubert and Prince Phillip leave the kingdom for a Royal Conference; Aurora is left in charge of the kingdom, with the castle majordomo, Lord Duke, as her assistant. The fairies offer to help her, but Aurora declines; however, Aurora later asks the fairies to deliver Hubert his speech which he has forgotten at the castle. Before leaving with Flora and Fauna, Merryweather still is worried about Aurora and she gives her wand to the princess in case she needs any assistance and warns her to be very careful with it. The fairies manage to deliver the speech in time, and are about to return when Merryweather reveals she had lent her wand to Aurora when she was not supposed to do so. The fairies appear at the end of the segment and take part of the welcome-back meal by Aurora, along with Phillip, Stefan, Leah, Hubert, and Lord Duke.

They were also among the Disney characters to appear at the end of The Lion King 1½. They are in the last shown crowd before Timon and Pumbaa start the movie again sitting between Terk (from Tarzan) and Br'er Bear (from Song of the South).

==== Television ====
The three fairies had appeared as guests in the television series House of Mouse.

Flora, Fauna and Merryweather appear as regular characters in the animated series Sofia the First, in which they serve as headmistress at Royal Prep Academy. Unlike other appearances, Fauna wears glasses in this series.

In the series The Wonderful World of Mickey Mouse, the fairies make an appearance in the episode "Disappearing Act", where they appear to advise Mickey along with other magical characters.

==== Video games ====
The three good fairies appear as supporting characters in the Kingdom Hearts series of video games. They first appear in Kingdom Hearts II at Yen Sid's tower, giving Sora his new outfit after he wakes from his year-long sleep, as well as the Star Seeker Keyblade and the ability to use Drive, and later witness Maleficent's return to power. At first, they all argue over what color Sora's new outfit should be, until agreeing to zap it all at the same time, creating a black outfit with colorful highlights all over. In Kingdom Hearts Birth by Sleep, the fairies appear in their homeworld Enchanted Dominion, talking with Ventus about Aurora and Phillip and later assisting him in his battle against Maleficent. They also appear at the end of Aqua and Phillip's battle against Maleficent in her dragon form, again blessing Phillip's sword as he throws it into Maleficent's heart. Unlike the original film, the attack does not kill Maleficent.

The three appear as playable characters in the video game Disney Magic Kingdoms, having a supporting role during the game's main storyline.

==== Disney Parks and Resorts ====
The fairies appear at themed-parks as meet-and-greet characters, and in live shows and events. They co-host the Magic, Music and Mayhem show with the Fairy Godmother from Cinderella.

In the Disney Divas event at Disneyland, the fairies appear at the climax of the show, confronting Maleficent, the Evil Queen and Cruella de Vil, among others, and later introducing Cynthia Harriss, former president of Disneyland Resort.

== Reception ==
The characters received positive reception. Variety stated that "Some of the best parts of the picture are those dealing with the three good fairies," Rob Burch, of Hollywood News, noted how the fairies are more prominent than the film's title character Aurora: "It could be argued the three Fairies are the real heroines, as much of the running time revolves around them." Of the three, he praised Merryweather as the best character. Bosley Crowther of The New York Times stated "Indeed, these busy little ladies, fluffy grandmotherly types, called Flora, Fauna and Merryweather, whose operations are conducted largely with wands." He further notes: "They [the fairies] are cunning, especially when they've 'wanded' themselves down to glowworm size and go buzzing through the palace or across the country as cheerful little lights."
