= Maria Pia Di Meo =

Italian actress (born 1939)

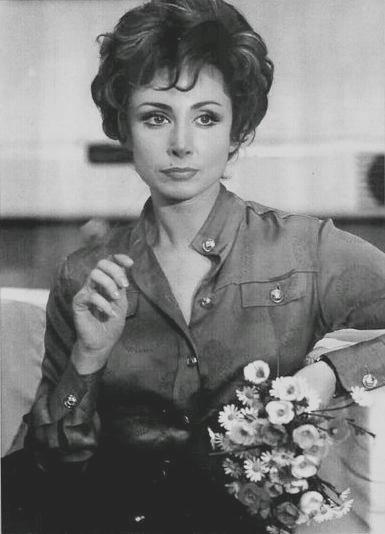
- Di Meo in 1971
- Born: Maria Pia Tempestini; 23 September 1939 (age 86); Rome, Italy
- Occupations: Actress; voice actress; dubbing director
- Years active: 1944–present
- Parents: Giotto Tempestini (father); Anna Di Meo (mother)

Maria Pia Di Meo (born Maria Pia Tempestini, 23 September 1939) is an Italian actress and voice actress, best known for being the official voice dubber of Meryl Streep and Julie Andrews.

== Biography ==
Born in Rome, the daughter of actors Giotto Tempestini and Anna Di Meo, she began her voice actress career in 1944, when she was very young, and occasionally acted on stage together with her parents.

Among the several actresses she dubbed, along with Meryl Streep, Jane Fonda, Audrey Hepburn, Julie Andrews, Julie Christie, Shirley MacLaine and Susan Sarandon. Di Meo has also been very active in dubbing many animated characters, including Princess Aurora in Sleeping Beauty and Anita in One Hundred and One Dalmatians.

== Dubbing roles ==
=== Animation ===
- Princess Aurora in Sleeping Beauty
- Anita Radcliffe in One Hundred and One Dalmatians
- Mrs. Fox in Fantastic Mr. Fox
- Littlefoot's mother in The Land Before Time
- Queen Lilian in Shrek 2
- Queen Lilian in Shrek the Third
- Queen Lilian in Shrek Forever After
- Miss Kitty in An American Tail: Fievel Goes West
- Madame Suliman in Howl's Moving Castle
- Gothel in Barbie as Rapunzel
- Shuriki in Elena and the Secret of Avalor
- The Queen in Maya the Bee
- The Queen in Maya the Bee: The Honey Games
- Madame in Kiki's Delivery Service
- Boy #1 in ChalkZone

=== Live action ===
- Linda in The Deer Hunter
- Joanna Kramer in Kramer vs. Kramer
- Karen Blixen in Out of Africa
- Karen Silkwood in Silkwood
- Molly Gilmore in Falling in Love
- Madeline Ashton in Death Becomes Her
- Lee Wakefield Lacker in Marvin's Room
- Mary Fisher in She-Devil
- Susan Traherne in Plenty
- Suzanne Vale in Postcards from the Edge
- Francesca Johnson in The Bridges of Madison County
- Roberta Guaspari in Music of the Heart
- Blue Fairy in A.I. Artificial Intelligence
- Clarissa Vaughan in The Hours
- Susan Orlean in Adaptation
- Josephine Anwhistle in Lemony Snicket's A Series of Unfortunate Events
- Yolanda Johnson in A Prairie Home Companion
- Miranda Priestly in The Devil Wears Prada and The Devil Wears Prada 2
- Janine Roth in Lions for Lambs
- Sister Aloysius Beauvier in Doubt
- Julia Child in Julie & Julia
- Margaret Thatcher in The Iron Lady
- Violet Weston in August: Osage County
- The Chief Elder in The Giver
- The Witch in Into the Woods
- Emmeline Pankhurst in Suffragette
- Florence Foster Jenkins in Florence Foster Jenkins
- Katharine Graham in The Post
- Aunt March in Little Women
- Sissi in Sissi – Fateful Years of an Empress
- Annemarie von Hartman in The Cardinal
- Janet Lagerlof in Good Neighbor Sam
- Marianne in The Swimming Pool
- Elisabeth of Austria in Ludwig
- Roberte Groult in Love at the Top
- Nadine Chevalier in That Most Important Thing: Love
- Margot Santorini in A Woman at Her Window
- Chantal Martinaud in The Inquisitor
- Katherine Mortenhoe in Death Watch
- Corie Bratter in Barefoot in the Park
- Barbarella in Barbarella
- Cat Ballou in Cat Ballou
- Ella Connors in Comes a Horseman
- Sally Hyde in Coming Home
- Kimberly Wells in The China Syndrome
- Hallie Martin in The Electric Horseman
- Martha Livingston in Agnes of God
- Brenda Morel in Youth
- Teddy Stanton in Fathers and Daughters
- Addie Moore in Our Souls at Night
- Fanny Brice in Funny Girl
- Fanny Brice in Funny Lady
- Dolly Levi in Hello, Dolly!
- Judy Maxwell in What's Up, Doc?
- Katie Morosky in The Way We Were
- Esther Hoffman Howard in A Star Is Born
- Yentl Mendel / Anshel Mendel in Yentl
- Susan Lowenstein in The Prince of Tides
- Rose Morgan in The Mirror Has Two Faces
- Roz Focker in Meet the Fockers
- Roz Focker in Little Fockers
- Princess Aouda in Around the World in 80 Days
- Fran Kubelik in The Apartment
- Irma la Douce in Irma la Douce
- Charity Hope Valentine in Sweet Charity
- Eve Rand in Being There
- Madame Yuvline Sousatzka in Madame Sousatzka
- Louisa "Ouiser" Boudreaux in Steel Magnolias
- Pearl Berman in Used People
- Tess Carlisle in Guarding Tess
- Ella Hirsch in In Her Shoes
- Coco Chanel in Coco Chanel
- Natasha Rostova in War and Peace
- Jo Stockton in Funny Face
- Sister Luke in The Nun's Story
- Holly Golightly in Breakfast at Tiffany's
- Regina Lampert in Charade
- Eliza Doolittle in My Fair Lady
- Nicole Bonnet in How to Steal a Million
- Joanna Wallace in Two for the Road
- Hap in Always
- Samoa in Samoa, Queen of the Jungle
- Cora in Le Mans, Shortcut to Hell
- Floriana in Your Vice Is a Locked Room and Only I Have the Key
- Luisa De Dominicis in The School Teacher in the House
- Nicole Molineaux in Eighteen in the Sun
- Francesca in Crazy Desire
- Mimi in The Libertine
- Cecilia in The Empty Canvas
- Dora in The Girl from Parma
- Anna Terzi in The Cat o' Nine Tails
- Claire Wilson in Ripped Off
- Mia in The Seventh Seal
- Sara in Wild Strawberries
- Hjördis Petterson in Brink of Life
- Sara in The Magician
- Britt-Marie in The Devil's Eye
- Miss Bumblebee in All These Women
- Alma in Persona
- Mary Poppins in Mary Poppins
- Maria von Trapp in The Sound of Music
- Sarah Louise Sherman in Torn Curtain
- Jerusha Bromley in Hawaii
- Judith Farrow in The Tamarind Seed
- Sally Miles in S.O.B.
- Victoria Grant / Count Victor Grezhinski Victor/Victoria
- Pamela Piquet in A Fine Romance
- Marianna in The Man Who Loved Women
- Julie Andrews in Unconditional Love
- Lily in Tooth Fairy
- Lara Antipova in Doctor Zhivago
- Clarisse Linda Montag in Fahrenheit 451
- Jackie Shawn in Shampoo
- Betty Logan in Heaven Can Wait
- Phyllis Mann in Afterglow
- Fiona Anderson in Away from Her
- Donatella in Donatella
- Onahti in The Indian Fighter
- Hilda in The Trial
- Doriana in Wild Cats on the Beach
- Elena in Rice Girl
- Anna in Rampage
- Patricia Franchini in Breathless
- Cecile in Bonjour Tristesse
- Giovanna in This Kind of Love
- Tanya Livingston in Airport
- Luisa in Gang War in Naples
- Varinia in Spartacus
- Elizabeth Rambeau in This Earth Is Mine
- Mary Follett in All the Way Home
- Molly Lang in Rough Night in Jericho
- Caro Plantin in The Black Tulip
- Mrs. Ford in How to Murder Your Wife
- Luisa in The Dolls
- Arabella in Arabella
- Suzanna Moritz in The 25th Hour
- Max in Mission: Impossible
- Sonia Wick in Girl, Interrupted
- Old Briony Tallis in Atonement
- Merry Noel Blake in Rich and Famous
- Judy Tobias in The In-Laws
- Kate Hennings in Sweet Home Alabama
- Kathleen Riley in Suspect
- Margaret Connor in Faithful
- Elsa Morganthal Strauss-Armistan in Tea with Mussolini
- Consuelo / Altagracia Di Lorna in Musketeers of the Sea
- Anna Curtis in The Angry Silence
- Ildith in Sodom and Gomorrah
- Rosa Delle Rose in The Rose Tattoo
- Maria Montagne in The Man in the Gray Flannel Suit
- Catherine de' Medici in Diane
- Patrizia in Don't Torture a Duckling
- Monica Brown in The Syndicate: A Death in the Family
- Louise Pendrake in Little Big Man
- Yolande of Aragon in The Messenger: The Story of Joan of Arc
- Zhora Salome in Blade Runner
- Dolores in Who Framed Roger Rabbit
- Thetis in Clash of the Titans
- Granny Wendy in Hook
- Mrs. Farraday in Mary Reilly
- Alicia Clark in The Paper
- Melanie Daniels in The Birds
- Marnie Edgar in Marnie
- Jill Bryant in The Year of Living Dangerously
- Valeria in The Anonymous Venetian
- Ronnie Neary in Close Encounters of the Third Kind
- Carol in Once Upon a Time in America
- Truly Scrumptious in Chitty Chitty Bang Bang
- Carlotta in Two Weeks in Another Town
- Connie Walsh in House of Sand and Fog
- Melinda Moores in The Green Mile
- Irene Walsh in The Goonies
- Belinda Conine in Philadelphia
- Lillian Thurman in Donnie Darko
- Tina in Martian Child
- Headmistress in Phenomena
- Mrs. Gump in Forrest Gump
- Holly Jones in Prisoners
- Edwina Cutwater in All of Me
- Principal McGee in Grease (2002 redub)
- Dolores "Lolita" Haze in Lolita
- Ophélie in Nutty, Naughty Chateau
