= Maleficent: Mistress of Evil (soundtrack) =

Maleficent Mistress of Evil (Original Motion Picture Soundtrack)

Film score by Geoff Zanelli
- Released: October 18, 2019
- Recorded: 2019
- Studios: Abbey Road Studios, London
- Genres: Orchestral; classical
- Length: 1:11:57
- Label: Walt Disney
- Producer: Geoff Zanelli

Geoff Zanelli chronology
Black and Blue (2019)	Maleficent: Mistress of Evil (2019)	You Should Have Left (2020)

Maleficent: Mistress of Evil (Original Motion Picture Soundtrack) is the score album to the 2019 film Maleficent: Mistress of Evil directed by Joachim Rønning, a sequel to Maleficent (2014). Geoff Zanelli, who previously collaborated with Rønning on Pirates of the Caribbean: Dead Men Tell No Tales (2017), scored music for the film, replacing James Newton Howard, who composed for the predecessor. The soundtrack was released by Walt Disney Records on October 18, 2019. It features 22 score cues composed by Zanelli, and a theme song "You Can't Stop the Girl" by Bebe Rexha, released earlier as a single on September 20, 2019. The score received positive critical response, with Zanelli's composition being considered as an improvement over Howard's score from the predecessor.

== Development ==
On May 22, 2019, Zanelli was hired to score music for the film, in an exclusive article written by Aaron Couch of The Hollywood Reporter. Speaking to the same magazine, Zanelli had said "the storytelling in Maleficent: Mistress of Evil is fantastic", for which he said that "writing [the film's] score is a dream come true". He stated that the music for Mistress of Evil is darker than the first film's score, as "This is a much larger story, a much bigger world in a sense, and the music reflects that. It's darker at times, I'd say, because it deals with a clash of cultures, both human vs. fey on a grand scale, and mother vs. mother on a more intimate scale. The story really does expand the world greatly", while further adding that each musical note is driven by the film's story.

Zanelli did not follow Howard's score from the first film, but he discussed with Rønning on applying the thematic material from the first film. During their conversations, Zanelli and Rønning wanted a traditional orchestral score as she and Aurora being rooted in the fairytale, however, with the arrival of Dark Fae, he explored various musical styles, saying "With them, all bets were off, and I could look all around the world to find a sound that is very exotic to us here in the West. These are local instruments from parts of Asia or Africa or India or Japan." As Maleficent is allergic to iron, Zanelli decided to steer away from using metal sounds, to give the character a different tonal approach, and stayed on using indigenous elements.

Zanelli implemented 80 different drums to accompany the score of Dark Fae, as "the power and the force of their wings implied a rage of percussion". He added "These are winged creatures. They live on the wind. So, wouldn't it seem like that would be what they’d start with for their own musical inventions?". In addition to percussive instruments, he added more woodwinds into the score, which are not orchestral, as well as few plucked strings. He did not want to pay homage to the score of Sleeping Beauty (1959), but however, employed a 108-piece orchestra to record the score at the Abbey Road Studios, London, to score the film similarly to earlier Disney films.

"You Can't Stop the Girl", a theme song performed by Bebe Rexha was released as a single on September 20, 2019, before it was included in the soundtrack. Zanelli said that he and the team, had listened to the song, and the team had agreed to use in the film. But, he thought of integrating the song in the world of Maleficent, hence, he wrote: an orchestral and choir arrangement to compliment Rexha's vocal, and the other, more band-like elements that were already present.

== Track listing ==
Maleficent: Mistress of Evil (Original Motion Picture Soundtrack)
No.	Title	Length
1.	"Mistress of Evil" (Contains original Maleficent themes by James Newton Howard)	1:33
2.	"Poachers on the Moors"	4:24
3.	"What Is Going On Here?" (Contains original Maleficent themes by James Newton Howard)	4:31
4.	"Ulstead"	2:39
5.	"Etiquette Lesson" (Contains original Maleficent themes by James Newton Howard)	2:05
6.	"All He Wanted Was Peace"	4:50
7.	"We Have Her"	3:49
8.	"We're Dark Fey"	3:53
9.	"Pinto's Retcon Mission"	1:52
10.	"It Is Love That Will Heal You"	2:07
11.	"Origin Story"	2:30
12.	"You Don't Have To Change" (Contains original Maleficent themes by James Newton Howard)	2:01
13.	"The Dance of the Fey"	2:11
14.	"Back to the Moors" (Contains original Maleficent themes by James Newton Howard)	1:14
15.	"Our Fight Begins Now!"	1:45
16.	"Your Majesty, They're Coming from the Sea"	2:16
17.	"I've Made My Choice, You'll Have to Make Yours"	3:33
18.	"Protecting Our Kind"	2:42
19.	"Maleficent Returns" (Contains original Maleficent themes by James Newton Howard)	5:09
20.	"The Phoenix" (Contains original Maleficent themes by James Newton Howard)	4:41
21.	"Hello, Beastie!" (Contains original Maleficent themes by James Newton Howard)	3:42
22.	"Time to Come Home" (Contains original Maleficent themes by James Newton Howard)	5:49
23.	"You Can't Stop the Girl" (Bebe Rexha)	2:38
Total length:		1:11:57

== Reception ==
Zanelli's score received positive response from critics, who called it as a favorable comparison to Howard's score from the predecessor. Music critic Jonathan Broxton of Movie Music UK said: "Geoff Zanelli is essentially doing a James Newton Howard impression for most of the score, but you can't hold that against him, especially when Howard established such a strong musical identity for this world in the first film. Not only that, making the score convincing enough to follow the precedent while also giving it enough original musical content to be enjoyable in its own right is no mean feat, and Zanelli succeeds at it admirably. The Dark Fey material is excellent, as is the conceptual thinking behind it all as it relates to the relationship between the Dark Fey and Queen Ingrith's duplicity. Add to this some excellent and enjoyable action material, and plenty of emotional resonance, and you have a score which works on all levels." James Southall of Movie Wave wrote "Howard's music was genuinely phenomenal so it's nice to hear it again: classic fantasy scoring, with soaring themes, thunderous action music, magical choral might and twinkly, playful light-hearted moments. Zanelli does an impressive job reworking it and adds a few new colours (including a striking one provided by some sort of dulcimer). Some of the original material is also very strong – around the middle section of the score the composer starts doing more of his own thing."

Anton Smit of Soundtrack World had stated: "Geoff Zanelli has proven with the fifth Pirates of the Caribbean movie that he is able to do just that, and he has done so again for this score. Not only are the existing themes integrated very well in this score, but Zanelli's new material is wonderful to listen to as well. I love scores with well thought out ideas and many thematic melodies, and this is an excellent example." Filmtracks.com wrote "Zanelli's work doesn't have the awe-inspiring highlights of Howard's original, but it is extremely smart, cohesive, and accomplished from start to end. All things considered, once Howard was not re-signed, this was the best result that concept and film music fans could have hoped for, a faithful adaptation and spell-binding evolution."

== Charts ==
Chart performance for Maleficent: Mistress of Evil (Original Motion Picture Soundtrack)
Chart (2019)	Peak position
UK Soundtrack Albums (OCC)	39
US Soundtrack Albums (Billboard)	24
