= Maleficent (film series) =

Disney media franchise

Disney's Maleficent
- Original work: Maleficent (2014)
- Owner: The Walt Disney Company
- Years: 2014–present
- Based on: Disney's Sleeping Beauty; La Belle au bois dormant by Charles Perrault

Print publications
- Book(s): The Curse of Maleficent: The Tale of a Sleeping Beauty; Heart of the Moors: An Original Maleficent: Mistress of Evil Novel

Films and television
- Film(s): Maleficent (2014); Maleficent: Mistress of Evil (2019)

Games
- Video game(s): Maleficent Free Fall

Audio
- Soundtrack(s): Maleficent; Maleficent: Mistress of Evil

Maleficent is a Disney media franchise that began in 2014 with the theatrical release of Maleficent.

== Premise ==
The film series takes inspiration from the 1959 animated classic, Sleeping Beauty, but from the perspective of the villainous Maleficent, where she's adapted as protector and the most powerful fairy of the Moors, who, in revenge for betrayal, casts a curse on the daughter of her ex-lover King Stefan, Aurora. Over the course of the film, she goes from a hero to villain, following Stefan's betrayal, and back to hero due to maternal feelings she develops towards Aurora.

== Feature films ==
Film(s)	Director(s)	Producer(s)	Screenwriter(s)	Composer	Editor(s)	Cinematographer
Maleficent	Robert Stromberg	Joe Roth	Linda Woolverton	James Newton Howard	Chris Lebenzon and Richard Pearson	Dean Semler
Maleficent: Mistress of Evil	Joachim Rønning	Joe Roth, Angelina Jolie and Duncan Henderson	Linda Woolverton, Noah Harpster and Micah Fitzerman-Blue	Geoff Zanelli	Laura Jennings and Craig Wood	Henry Braham

=== Maleficent (2014) ===
Maleficent is a live-action adaptation/remake of 1959's animated film Sleeping Beauty, from the eponymous antagonist. In 2003, during Don Hahn's meeting with Disney's animation department, it was suggested to create an origin film about Maleficent from Disney's animated film Sleeping Beauty in the same vein as then just released Broadway musical Wicked. The film was originally conceived as animated, but, according to Hahn, it was "too difficult", so it was decided to go for a live-action approach instead. In 2005, Hahn met with Tim Burton to pitch him several projects for Disney, including Maleficent, which Burton agreed to direct, but did not start working on it until around the summer of 2009, when he was finishing Alice in Wonderland (2010). Around the same time, Hahn approached Linda Woolverton, with whom he had previously worked on Beauty and the Beast (1991) and The Lion King (1994), to write the script, and in March 2010 she officially joined the project, while the studio began negotiations with Angelina Jolie to star as Maleficent. Burton personally supervised the development of the film for six months to a year, until in May 2011 it was announced that he had left the project due to his commitments to Frankenweenie (2012) and Dark Shadows (2012). Following Burton's departure, the studio considered David Yates, Darren Aronofsky, and David O. Russell to take over as director. Guillermo del Toro also expressed a desire to direct the film, citing Sleeping Beauty (1959) as one of his three favorite Disney films. In September 2011, Joe Roth joined the project as a producer, and in January 2012 it was announced that Robert Stromberg, the production designer of Avatar (2009), Alice in Wonderland (2010) and Oz the Great and Powerful (2013), would direct the film in his directional debut. A month later, during the 62nd Berlin International Film Festival, Jolie officially confirmed her involvement in the project.

Linda Woolverton's screenplay went through at least 15 versions as the film progressed in production. Stromberg said: "I met many times with Linda Woolverton, the writer. We did lots of roundtable discussions and sort of cut out the fat as much as we could and sort of purified the storyline as much as we could". Paul Dini also performed rewrites on the project with Stromberg, and was credited in early press. In some earlier versions of the story, Stefan was the half-human, half-fairy bastard son of King Henry. The version of the screenplay that went into shooting originally included two characters called Queen Ulla and King Kinloch, the fairy queen and fairy king of the Moors and the aunt and uncle of Maleficent. Miranda Richardson and Peter Capaldi were cast and shot the Queen Ulla and King Kinloch scenes, but their roles were cut in the editing process together with more than 15 minutes of the first act of the film. Stromberg said, "We spent a bit more time originally in the fairy world before we got into the human side of things ... we wanted to get it [the film] under two hours. So we cut about 15 minutes out of the first act, and then that had to be seamed together with some pretty basic reshoots."

Stromberg later claimed in an interview that he employed an "age-old" emotional storytelling for the film and called it "the biggest thrill" against all technology advances. "And the way we play with that is we have somebody who's perhaps in love but betrayed and doesn't believe that true love exists. So the moral to it is we can all feel dark ourselves but not to lose hope because there is light in places where we might not be expecting", he explained. Principal photography began on June 13, 2012, at Pinewood Studios. Some filming took place in the Buckinghamshire countryside near Turville.

The film was originally slated for a March 14, 2014 release, before it was changed to July 2, 2014. On September 18, 2013, the film's release date was preponed to May 30, 2014, as Pixar's The Good Dinosaur faced production issues and delayed to 2015. In the United Kingdom, the film was released on May 28, 2014.

=== Maleficent: Mistress of Evil (2019) ===
Maleficent: Mistress of Evil is the sequel of the 2014 film Maleficent, continuing the story of the first film. The film was released on October 18, 2019. On June 3, 2014, following the release of the first film, Angelina Jolie hinted that a sequel to Maleficent was a possibility. On June 15, 2015, Walt Disney Pictures announced that the sequel was in the works and that Linda Woolverton would return to write the screenplay for the film. Although Jolie's return to the sequel was not yet certain, the script was intended to be written with her in mind. In addition, Joe Roth was reported to return as producer of the film. On April 25, 2016, Disney officially confirmed Jolie's return as the title character. On August 29, 2017, it was reported that Jez Butterworth would rewrite Woolverton's script while Roth was confirmed as returning as producer. In September 2017, Jolie stated that they "have been working on the script and this is going to be a really strong sequel." On October 3, 2017, Deadline reported that the film would be directed by Joachim Rønning and it would start filming in the first quarter of 2018.

In April 2018, Ed Skrein was cast in the film to play a dark fae, with Elle Fanning returning to play Princess Aurora from the previous film. Michelle Pfeiffer was also added as a character described as a queen, later clarified to be an evil queen named Queen Ingrith.

In May 2018, it was announced that Harris Dickinson would replace Brenton Thwaites in the role of Prince Phillip, due to scheduling conflicts with the latter actor. Later it was also confirmed that Jenn Murray, David Gyasi, Chiwetel Ejiofor and Robert Lindsay had also joined the cast. Sam Riley, Imelda Staunton, Juno Temple and Lesley Manville were also confirmed to reprise their roles from the prior film. In June 2018 Judith Shekoni joined the cast.

The movie was theatrically released on October 18, 2019 by Walt Disney Studios Motion Pictures, moving up from the film's previously announced date of May 29, 2020., and on December 31, 2019 by Walt Disney Studios Home Entertainment on Digital HD, followed by a 4K Ultra HD, Blu-ray and DVD release on January 14, 2020. Maleficent: Mistress of Evil was released on Disney+ on May 15, 2020.

=== Future film in development ===
A third film is in early development. In December 2023, Angelina Jolie stated that she is returning to the title role.

== Video game ==
=== Maleficent Free Fall ===
A video game based on the film, titled Maleficent Free Fall and made by Disney Electronic Content, Inc., was released on May 15, 2014.

== Cast and characters ==
List indicators

This section includes characters who will appear or have appeared in the series.

- An empty grey cell indicates the character was not in the film, or that the character's official presence has not yet been confirmed.
- ^{MC} indicates a motion-capture-only role.
- ^{O} indicates an older version of the character.
- ^{V} indicates a voice-only role.
- ^{Y} indicates a younger version of the character.

Characters	Films	
Characters	Maleficent	Maleficent Mistress of Evil
Characters	2014	2019
Maleficent	Angelina Jolie Ella Purnell^{T} Isobelle Molloy^{Y}	Angelina Jolie
Aurora	Elle Fanning Janet McTeer^{O}^{V} Eleanor Worthington Cox^{Y} Vivienne Jolie-Pitt^{Y}	Elle Fanning
Diaval	Sam Riley	Sam Riley
Knotgrass	Imelda Staunton	Imelda Staunton
Flittle	Lesley Manville	Lesley Manville
Thistlewit	Juno Temple	Juno Temple
Prince Phillip	Brenton Thwaites	Harris Dickinson
King Stefan	Sharlto Copley Jackson Bews^{T} Michael Higgins^{Y}	Mentioned
King Henry	Kenneth Cranham	
Queen Leila	Hannah New	
King John	Mentioned	Robert Lindsay
Queen Ingrith		Michelle Pfeiffer
Conall		Chiwetel Ejiofor
Borra		Ed Skrein
Lickspittle		Warwick Davis
Gerda		Jenn Murray
Percival		David Gyasi

== Reception ==
=== Critical and public response ===
Critical and public response of Maleficent
Title	Critical		Public
Title	Rotten Tomatoes	Metacritic	CinemaScore
Maleficent	54% (277 reviews)	56 (44 reviews)	A
Maleficent: Mistress of Evil	39% (261 reviews)	43 (40 reviews)	A

== See also ==
- Sleeping Beauty (franchise)
- Wicked
