= Mayumi Suzuki =

Japanese voice actress

Mayumi Suzuki (すずきまゆみ, Suzuki Mayumi; born August 8, 1970) is a Japanese voice actress who graduated from the Tokyo College of Music as a vocalist. She is best known for dubbing over a number of Disney heroines.

== Roles ==
With the exception of her role in the Kingdom Hearts series, all entries in this list are dubbing roles.

=== Film & Movie animation ===
- The Chipmunk Adventure (the Chipettes)

=== Television animation ===
- House of Mouse (Ariel (Jodi Benson))

=== OVA ===
- The Little Mermaid II: Return to the Sea (Ariel (Jodi Benson))
- Mulan II (Mulan (Ming-Na))
- Tarzan & Jane (Jane Porter (Olivia d'Abo))
- The Little Mermaid: Ariel's Beginning (Ariel (Jodi Benson))

=== Theatrical animation ===
- The Little Mermaid (Ariel (Jodi Benson))
- Mulan (Mulan (Ming-Na))
- Sleeping Beauty (Buena Vista edition) (Princess Aurora (Mary Costa))
- Tarzan (Jane Porter (Minnie Driver))
- Ralph Breaks the Internet (Aurora (Kate Higgins), Mulan (Ming-Na))

=== Video games ===
- Kingdom Hearts (Jane, Ariel)
- Kingdom Hearts II (Mulan, Ariel)
- Kingdom Hearts Birth by Sleep (Aurora)

=== Live action ===
- Roman Holiday (2004 TV edition) (Princess Ann (Audrey Hepburn))
