= You Can't Stop the Girl =

Single by Bebe Rexha

from the album Maleficent: Mistress of Evil (Original Motion Picture Soundtrack)
- Released: September 20, 2019
- Genre: Pop
- Length: 2:38
- Label: Warner; Walt Disney
- Composers: Aaron Huffman; Evan Sult; Jeff Lin; Michael Pollack; Nate Cyphert; Sean Nelson; Alex Schwartz; Joe Khajadourian
- Lyricist: Bleta Rexha
- Producer: The Futuristics

Bebe Rexha singles chronology
"Harder" (2019)	"You Can't Stop the Girl" (2019)	"Baby, I'm Jealous" (2020)

Music video
- "You Can't Stop the Girl" on YouTube

"You Can't Stop the Girl" is a song by American singer Bebe Rexha from the soundtrack of the 2019 American fantasy film Maleficent: Mistress of Evil. It was released as a single on September 20, 2019. It was included on the soundtrack of the film, which was released on October 18, 2019.

== Background and promotion ==
Rexha announced the single on September 17, 2019, following a snippet released the day before. The writers of "Flagpole Sita" by Harvey Danger are credited as songwriters due to melodic similarity.

== Critical reception ==
Claire Shaffer of Rolling Stone wrote that the song "spins the story of Maleficent into a classic girl empowerment anthem [...] and lets Rexha show off her impressive vocal belt." Writing for MTV, Trey Alston stated that "Bebe Rexha has just provided the anthem for power and resilience this winter [...] Being that it's attached to something so massive, it makes sense that it is so wide-eyed and vivid, ready to rear into roaring view. Inevitability has never sounded so strong."

== Music video ==
The inspirational music video was directed by Sophie Muller. It features Rexha leading fellow female runners through a city. The video also shows Rexha wandering through a "magical" and "butterfly-filled" forest while sporting a glittering black gown and headpiece. The video was released on October 15, 2019.

== Credits and personnel ==
Credits adapted from Tidal.

- Bebe Rexha – vocals, songwriter
- The Futuristics – songwriter, producer
- Aaron Huffman – songwriter
- Evan Sult – songwriter
- Jeff Lin – songwriter
- Micheal Pollack – songwriter
- Nate Cyphert – songwriter
- Sean Nelson – songwriter
- Geoff Zanelli – orchestra and choir arranger
- Randy Merrill – masterer
- Manny Marroquin – mixer

== Charts ==
Chart (2019–2020)	Peak position
Netherlands (Dutch Top 40)	29
Netherlands (Single Top 100)	78
New Zealand Hot Singles (RMNZ)	31
US Adult Pop Airplay (Billboard)	34
US Kid Digital Songs (Billboard)	1
US Pop Airplay (Billboard)	40

== Release history ==
Country	Date	Format	Label	Ref.
Various	September 20, 2019	Digital download; streaming	Warner	
United States	September 23, 2019	Adult contemporary radio	Warner	
Italy	November 15, 2019	Radio airplay	Warner	
