= Verna Felton =

American actress (1890–1966)

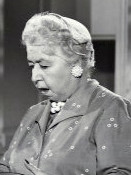
- Felton in 1960 as "Hilda Crocker" from the television program Pete and Gladys.
- Born: Verna Arline Felton; July 20, 1890; Salinas, California, U.S.
- Died: December 14, 1966 (aged 76); Los Angeles, California, U.S.
- Resting place: Grand View Memorial Park Cemetery
- Occupation: Actress
- Years active: 1900–1966
- Known for: Mrs. Jumbo and Elephant Matriarch in Dumbo (1941); The Fairy Godmother in Cinderella (1950); Queen of Hearts in Alice in Wonderland (1951); Aunt Sarah in Lady and the Tramp (1955); Flora in Sleeping Beauty (1959); Pearl Slaghoople in The Flintstones (1962–63); Winifred the Elephant in The Jungle Book (1967)
- Television: The Jack Benny Program (1939–55; on radio) (1955–62; on television); December Bride (1952–53; on radio) (1954–59; on television)
- Spouse: Lee Carson Millar Sr. (m. 1923; died 1941)
- Children: 1

Verna Arline Felton (July 20, 1890 – December 14, 1966) was an American actress known for voicing characters in several classic Disney animated films, including the Fairy Godmother in Cinderella (1950), the Queen of Hearts in Alice in Wonderland (1951), and Flora in Sleeping Beauty (1959).

She also provided the voice for Fred Flintstone's mother-in-law, Pearl Slaghoople in Hanna-Barbera's The Flintstones (1962–63) and had roles in live-action films. However, she was most active in radio programs, where her characters were known for their husky voices and no-nonsense attitudes. Two of her most famous roles were as Dennis Day's mother, Mrs. Day on both radio and television versions of The Jack Benny Program (1939–62) and as Hilda Crocker on December Bride (1952–59).

Felton's television appearances included The George Burns and Gracie Allen Show, I Love Lucy, Where's Raymond?, Pete and Gladys and Dennis the Menace.

== Early years ==
Verna Arline Felton was born in Salinas, California, on July 20, 1890. Her father, Horace Wilcox Felton, a doctor, died shortly before her ninth birthday. When going over his accounts after his death, Felton's mother Clara Winder Felton (née Lawrence) discovered that although her husband had a large medical practice in San Jose, there were no records of his patients' payments for treatment and no cash in the office.

Shortly before her father's death, Felton had performed in a local benefit for victims of the Galveston Flood. Her singing and dancing attracted the attention of a manager of a road show company that was playing in San Jose at the time. The manager spoke to Felton's mother, offering to give Felton a job with his company. Since the family was experiencing difficult financial times with the loss of Felton's father, her mother contacted the road show manager. Felton quickly joined the cast of the show, growing up in the theater.

== Early career ==
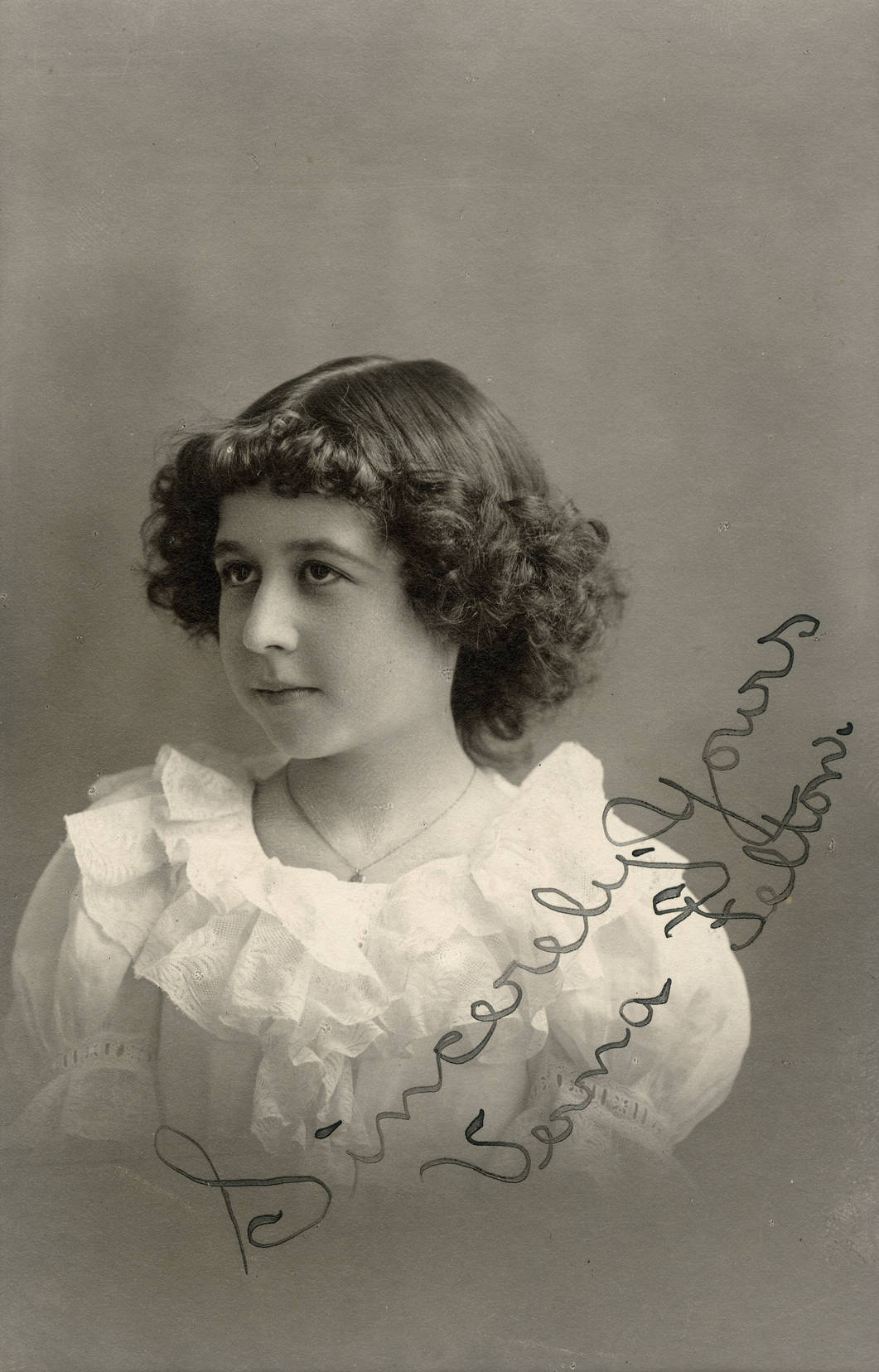
Felton in 1903

An August 19, 1900, newspaper advertisement for Fischer's Concert House in San Francisco listed among the performers "Little Verna Felton, the Child Wonder." By 1903, she was acting with the Allen Stock Company, which that year toured the West Coast of the United States and performed in Vancouver, British Columbia, Canada. By 1907, she was still with the Allen troupe, but she had progressed from child performer to leading lady. Herbert Bashford wrote a play, The Defiance of Doris, specifically for Felton, and the Allen company included it among the group's productions in 1910.

She acted in stage plays at the Empress Theatre in Vancouver in the late 1920s, playing the lead role in Goldfish, Stella Dallas, and The Second Mrs. Tanqueray. Future husband Lee Millar (1888–1941) directed the band for these plays.

== Radio and TV ==
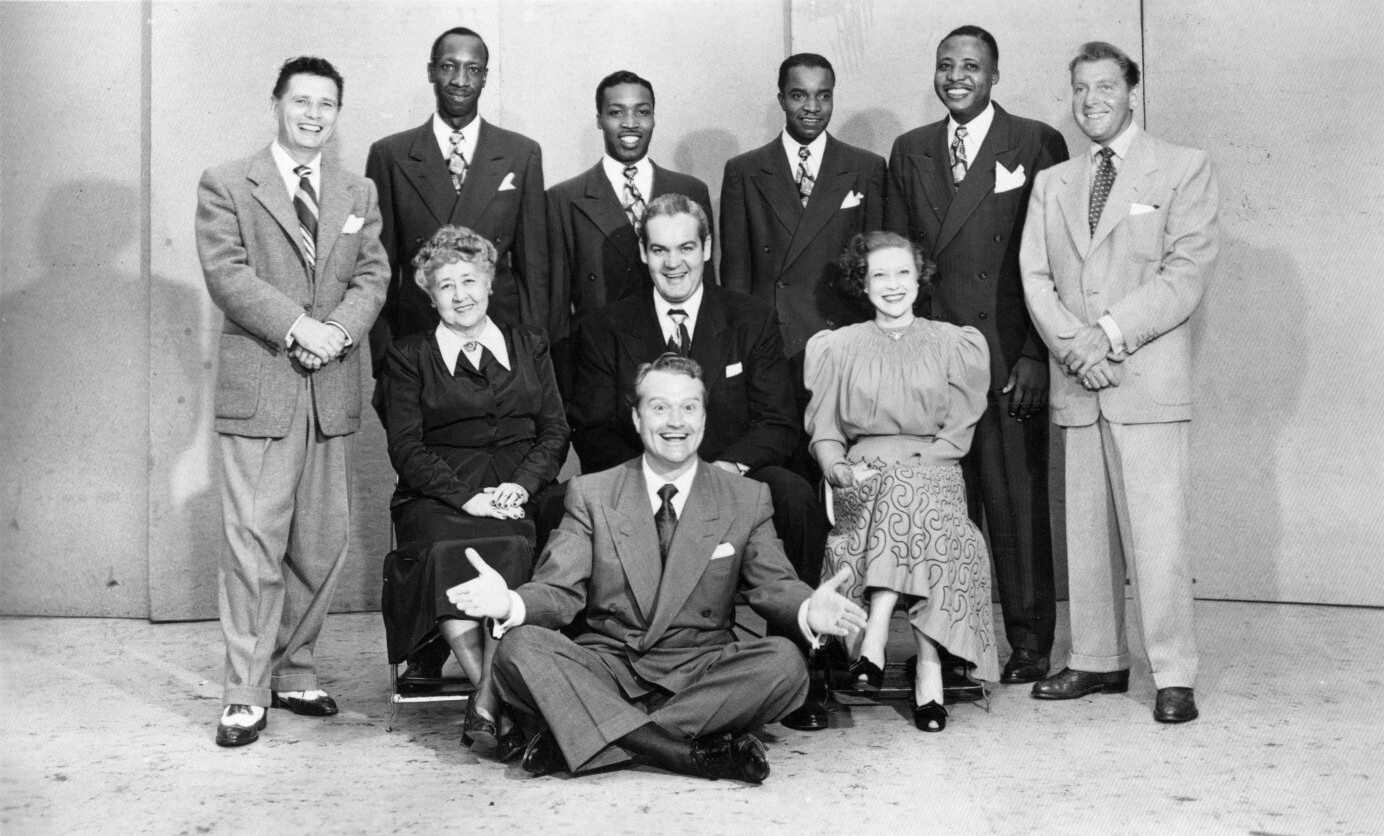
Raleigh Cigarettes Program 1948 cast: Standing: Pat McGeehan, The Four Knights, David Rose (orchestra leader). Seated: Verna Felton ("Grandma" to Skelton's "Junior" character), Rod O'Connor (announcer), Lurene Tuttle ("Mother" to Skelton's "Junior" character). Front: Red Skelton.

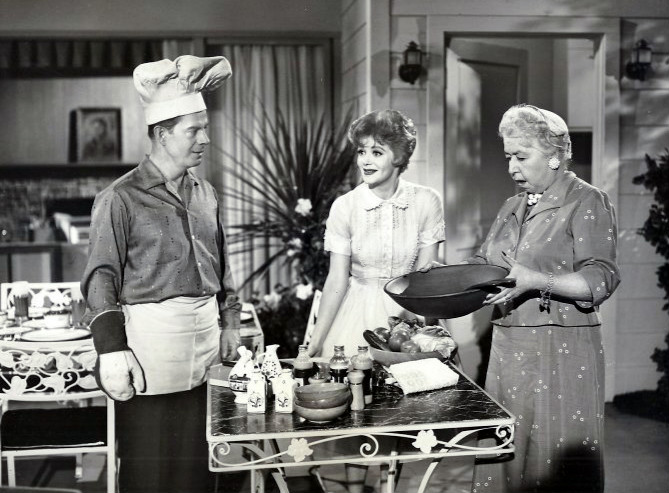
Harry Morgan, Cara Williams and Felton in Pete and Gladys (1960)

Felton worked in the 1930s and 1950s in radio, including playing the children's mother on the serial The Cinnamon Bear, Junior the Mean Widdle Kid's grandmother on Red Skelton's radio series, Hattie Hirsch on Point Sublime, and Dennis Day's mother, Mrs. Day, who was always looking out for him while trying to boss around Jack Benny on The Jack Benny Program. She recurred on The Great Gildersleeve and was heard on The Abbott and Costello Show and other comedy shows, as well as dramatic roles on The Lux Radio Theatre. She played the fairy godmother in one-shot adaptations of the Cinderella story on the anthology series Screen Directors Playhouse and Hallmark Playhouse.

Felton's first television appearance was in a 1951 episode of The Amos 'n Andy Show as a nurse. She appeared in a recurring role as the mother of Ruth Farley, a young woman played by Gloria Winters in the 1953–55 ABC sitcom with a variety show theme, Where's Raymond?, renamed The Ray Bolger Show. Though some sitcom aficionados might assume that her guest appearances on I Love Lucy led to a regular supporting role as Hilda Crocker on the CBS sitcom December Bride, Felton had played that same character on the radio version two years prior to the television production. Felton continued her Hilda Crocker role on the December Bride spin-off, Pete and Gladys, with Harry Morgan and Cara Williams. For her performance on December Bride, Felton was nominated for the Primetime Emmy Award for Outstanding Supporting Actress in a Comedy Series in 1958 and 1959.

Felton was the original voice of Fred Flintstone's mother-in-law, Pearl Slaghoople, voicing the character as a semi-regular in seasons two and three of Hanna-Barbera's landmark TV series The Flintstones. Fred's mother-in-law was not named during Felton's run; the "Slaghoople" name was mentioned in season four when Janet Waldo debuted in the role. In 1963, in the series finale of CBS's Dennis the Menace sitcom, Felton played John Wilson's aunt in the episode entitled "Aunt Emma Visits the Wilsons". In the story line, Mr. Wilson (Gale Gordon) tries to convince Aunt Emma to leave her estate to him and his wife, Eloise (Sara Seegar). Wilson becomes suspicious when Emma begins spending time with Dennis Mitchell (Jay North). Felton's son Lee Millar Jr. played Tommy Anderson's father on the same sitcom.

== Film and animation ==
Felton's first on-screen appearance was in the 1917 silent film, The Chosen Prince, or The Friendship of David and Jonathan. During the 1940s and the early 1950s, she was in demand as a character actress in films, with roles in If I Had My Way (1940), Girls of the Big House (1945), The Fuller Brush Man (1948), Buccaneer's Girl (1950), Belles on Their Toes, Don't Bother to Knock (both 1952), and her memorable role as Mrs. Potts warmly acting as surrogate mother to William Holden in the 1955 film adaptation of William Inge's stage play Picnic.

Felton was a popular actress at the Walt Disney Studios, lending her voice to the animated features:

- Dumbo (1941) as the Elephant Matriarch and Mrs. Jumbo, Dumbo's Mother
- Cinderella (1950) as The Fairy Godmother
- Alice in Wonderland (1951) as the Queen of Hearts
- Lady and the Tramp (1955) as Aunt Sarah, Jim Dear's aunt (Felton's son voiced Jim Dear and the dogcatcher)
- Sleeping Beauty (1959) as Flora, the red fairy
- The Jungle Book (1967) as Winifred the elephant (posthumous release, her final role, animated or live-action)

According to the Los Angeles Times, Felton served as Honorary Mayor of North Hollywood for several years.

== Death ==
Felton died at her home of a stroke at the age of 76 on the evening of December 14, 1966, one day before Walt Disney's death. Her final film, The Jungle Book, was released in October 1967. She is interred at Grand View Memorial Park Cemetery in Glendale, California.

== Credits ==
=== Radio ===
Original Air Date	Program	Role	Notes
1937	The Cinnamon Bear	Mother	
1938–1939	Candid Lady	Aunt Julia	
1939	Fibber McGee and Molly	Mrs. Homer Gildersleeve	
1939–1942	The Great Gildersleeve	Miss Fitch, Mrs. Godwin	
1939–1955	The Jack Benny Program	Mrs. Day (Dennis's mother)	
1940–1944; 1947–1948	Point Sublime	Hattie Hirsch	
1942	Lux Radio Theatre	Madame Therese DeFarge	"A Tale of Two Cities"
1942–1943	Tommy Riggs and Betty Lou	Mrs. MacIntyre	
1942–49	The Abbott and Costello Show	Multiple characters	
1943–1947	The Joan Davis Show	Blossom Blimp	Also known as The Sealtest Village Store
1944	Command Performance	Saleswoman	"Christmas"
1944–1952	The Judy Canova Show	Aunt Aggie	
1945	The Old Gold Comedy Theater	Nick's Mother	"My Favorite Wife"; Also known as The Harold Lloyd Theater
1946–1953	The Red Skelton Show	Junior's Grandmother, Mrs. Fussey, & others	
1948	Suspense	Ada	"The Man Who Thought He Was Edward G. Robinson"
1950	Young Love	Janet's Mother Mrs. Shaw	"Visit by Janet's Mom and Jimmy's Dad"
1950	Screen Directors Playhouse	The Fairy Godmother	"Cinderella"
1951	Hallmark Playhouse	The Fairy Godmother	'"The Story of Cinderella'"
1952–1953	December Bride	Hilda Crocker	Radio version
1952–1955	My Little Margie	Mrs. Odetts	Radio version

=== Film ===
Year	Title	Role	Notes
1917	The Chosen Prince, or the Friendship of David and Jonathan	Michal	
1939	Joe and Ethel Turp Call on the President	Neighbor	Uncredited
1940	Northwest Passage	Mrs. Jill Towne	Uncredited
1940	If I Had My Way	Mrs. Abigail DeLacey	
1941	Dumbo	Elephant Matriarch / Mrs. Jumbo	Voice, Uncredited
1945	Girls of the Big House	Agnes	
1946	She Wrote the Book	Mrs. Lauren Kilgour	Uncredited
1948	The Fuller Brush Man	Junior's Grandmother	Uncredited
1950	Cinderella	The Fairy Godmother	Voice
1950	Buccaneer's Girl	Dowager	
1950	The Gunfighter	Mrs. August Pennyfeather	
1951	New Mexico	Mrs. Fenway	
1951	Alice in Wonderland	Queen of Hearts	Voice
1951	Little Egypt	Mrs. Samantha Doane	
1952	Belles on Their Toes	Cousin Leora	
1952	Don't Bother To Knock	Mrs. Alex Ballew	
1955	Lady and the Tramp	Aunt Sarah	Voice
1955	Picnic	Mrs. Helen Potts	
1957	The Oklahoman	Mrs. Stephanie Waynebrook	
1957	Taming Sutton's Gal	Aunty Sutton	
1959	Sleeping Beauty	Flora / Queen Leah	Voice
1960	Guns of the Timberland	Aunt Sarah	
1965	The Man from Button Willow	Mrs. Tiffany Pomeroy, Mother, Lady on Trolley	Voice
1967	The Jungle Book	Winifred	Voice, Released Posthumously, (final film role)

=== Television ===
Year	Program	Role	Notes
1951	The Amos 'n Andy Show	Nurse	"Kingfish Has a Baby"; Uncredited
1952	The Ezio Pinza Show	Mrs. Day	
1952–1953	The George Burns and Gracie Allen Show	Emily Marsh, Mrs. Rodney, Maggie, Mrs. Evans	4 episodes
1952–1954	The Dennis Day Show	Dennis' Mother Mrs. Day	
1953	I Love Lucy	Mrs. Simpson, Mrs. Porter	"Sales Resistance" & "Lucy Hires a Maid"
1953–1955	Where's Raymond?	Ruth Farley's Mother	
1954	Walt Disney's Disneyland	Queen of Hearts (voice, archived)	"Alice in Wonderland"
1954–1959	December Bride	Hilda Crocker	155 episodes
1955	Walt Disney's Disneyland	Mrs. Jumbo / Elephant Matriarch (voice, archived)	"Dumbo"
1955–1962	The Jack Benny Program	Dennis' Mother Mrs. Day	5 episodes
1957	Climax!	Nurse	"The Disappearance of Amanda Hale"
1959	The Many Loves of Dobie Gillis	Mrs. Lapping	"Deck the Halls"
1960	The Real McCoys	Naomi Vesper	"Cousin Naomi"
1960–1961	Pete and Gladys	Hilda Crocker	30 episodes Spin-off of December Bride
1961	Miami Undercover	Aramintha	"Cukie Dog"
1962	Wagon Train	Gran Jennings	"The Lonnie Fallon Story"
1962	Henry Fonda and the Family		TV miniseries
1962	My Three Sons	Mub	"Coincidences"
1962–1963	The Flintstones	Pearl Slaghoople	Voice role 4 episodes
1963	Dennis the Menace	Aunt Emma	"Aunt Emma Visits the Wilsons"
1977	The Wonderful World of Disney	Flora (voice, archived)	"Sleeping Beauty"
1983	Walt Disney	Flora (voice, archived)	"Sleeping Beauty"
1998	The Wonderful World of Disney	Flora (voice, archived)	"Sleeping Beauty"

=== Discography ===
- Walt Disney's Cinderella: Little Miller Series (1949, RCA/Camden) - The Fairy Godmother
- Walt Disney's Cinderella (1954, RCA/Camden) - The Fairy Godmother
- Disney Songs and Story: Sleeping Beauty (2012, Walt Disney Records) - Flora
