= Maleficent: Mistress of Evil =

2019 film by Joachim Rønning

- Theatrical release poster
- Directed by: Joachim Rønning
- Written by: Linda Woolverton; Noah Harpster; Micah Fitzerman-Blue
- Based on: Characters from: Disney's Sleeping Beauty; "La Belle au Bois Dormant" by Charles Perrault
- Produced by: Joe Roth; Angelina Jolie; Duncan Henderson
- Starring: Angelina Jolie; Elle Fanning; Chiwetel Ejiofor; Sam Riley; Harris Dickinson; Ed Skrein; Imelda Staunton; Juno Temple; Lesley Manville; Michelle Pfeiffer
- Cinematography: Henry Braham
- Edited by: Laura Jennings; Craig Wood
- Music by: Geoff Zanelli
- Production companies: Walt Disney Pictures; Roth/Kirschenbaum Films
- Distributed by: Walt Disney Studios Motion Pictures
- Release dates: September 30, 2019 (El Capitan Theatre); October 18, 2019 (United States)
- Running time: 119 minutes
- Country: United States
- Language: English
- Budget: $186 million
- Box office: $491.7 million

Maleficent: Mistress of Evil is a 2019 American fantasy film and a sequel to Maleficent (2014), itself a live-action adaptation of Walt Disney's 1959 animated film Sleeping Beauty. Produced by Walt Disney Pictures and Roth/Kirschenbaum Films, it is the second installment in the Maleficent film series. The film was directed by Joachim Rønning and written by Linda Woolverton, Micah Fitzerman-Blue, and Noah Harpster. Angelina Jolie, Elle Fanning, Sam Riley, Imelda Staunton, Juno Temple, and Lesley Manville reprise their roles from the first film, with Chiwetel Ejiofor, Harris Dickinson (replacing Brenton Thwaites), Ed Skrein, and Michelle Pfeiffer. Set five years after the first film, the film sees Maleficent face the neighboring kingdom's manipulated perception of herself as a villain, in addition to a subplot of the rise of an endangered, powerful fairy race of the Dark Fey.

After the release of the first film in May 2014, Jolie stated a sequel was possible. The project was officially announced the following June. Jolie signed on in April 2016. Rønning, who co-directed Pirates of the Caribbean: Dead Men Tell No Tales (2017) for Disney, was hired to direct the film in October 2017. The rest of the cast was added/confirmed in May 2018, with filming beginning that month at Pinewood Studios in Buckinghamshire, England, lasting through August.

Maleficent: Mistress of Evil premiered in Los Angeles on September 30, 2019, and was released in the United States theatrically on October 18 by Walt Disney Studios Motion Pictures. It received mixed-to-negative reviews from critics, who praised the performances of Jolie, Fanning, and Pfeiffer, while criticizing the "muddled" plot and "overly artificial" visuals. The film grossed $491 million worldwide, although it needed to make around $500 million in order to make a profit theatrically when factoring in total budget, marketing and distribution costs. It also received an Academy Award nomination for Best Makeup and Hairstyling at the 92nd Academy Awards. A third film is currently in development.

== Plot ==
Five years since King Stefan's death, (Note: As depicted in Maleficent.) Aurora has benevolently reigned as Queen of the Moors, alongside Maleficent as its powerful guardian and protector. Despite her service, the neighbouring kingdom of Ulstead, home to Aurora's boyfriend Prince Philip, still sees Maleficent as a dangerous villain. Diaval, Maleficent's raven and confidant, overhears Aurora accepting Philip's marriage proposal. When he relays this to Maleficent, she advises against the union, though Aurora vows to prove her wrong.

Philip's parents, King John and Queen Ingrith, host an intimate dinner to celebrate. Maleficent maintains her composure after Ingrith tauntingly mentions Aurora's curse and Stefan's death. She openly claims Maleficent killed two human fairy poachers last seen near the Moors. When Ingrith carelessly dismisses Maleficent and Aurora's maternal bond, Maleficent reacts angrily and seemingly curses John, who suddenly falls into a deep slumber; Maleficent says she did not curse him, though Aurora disbelieves her. Philip urges his mother to awaken the King with a kiss; Ingrith resists, and her weak attempt fails because she does not love John. As Maleficent flees the castle, Ingrith's servant, Gerda, shoots Maleficent with an iron bullet.

Wounded, Maleficent falls into the ocean and is rescued by a winged creature. She awakens in a cavern where fairies like herself have been in hiding. Among them is Conall, their peaceful leader who saved Maleficent, and Borra, who favors open conflict with humans and had killed the poachers. Maleficent is among the last creatures called Dark Fey, powerful fairies forced into hiding and nearly driven to extinct by human oppression. She is also the last descendant of the Phoenix, an ancient and powerful Dark Fey ancestor. Because Maleficent's magic is so powerful, Conall and Borra believe she is instrumental in ending the conflict with humans through peace or war.

Meanwhile, Aurora is disillusioned with being an Ulstead noblewoman but is happy the Moor denizens are invited to the wedding. Aurora discovers that Ingrith hates all Moor fairy folk, bitterly resenting their prosperity during one winter when her kingdom had suffered and blaming them for her brother's death; she secretly plots to eradicate all Moor residents using iron weapons and a lethal crimson powder developed by Lickspittle, a de-winged pixie. Aurora also learns that Ingrith cursed John, using Maleficent's cursed spindle, which Ingrith had somehow taken to Ulstead. Ingrith finds out and has Aurora locked up.

The Moor folk are trapped inside the castle's chapel when they arrive. At Ingrith's command, Gerda unleashes the crimson powder by playing the chapel's organ. The fairy Flittle selflessly sacrifices herself to save everyone as a last resort by clogging the organ, rendering it unplayable, while fairies Knotgrass and Thistlewit cause Gerda to fall to her death. The Dark Fey attack Ulstead, but soldiers slaughter them until Maleficent joins the battle, channeling the Phoenix power. She nearly kills Queen Ingrith, but Aurora appeals to Maleficent's humanity, declaring only Maleficent is her mother. Distracted, Maleficent is struck by the Queen's powder-tipped arrow, dissolving into ashes. Devastated, Aurora mourns, but her tears revive Maleficent as a Phoenix. Terrified, Ingrith throws Aurora from the tower and flees, but Maleficent saves her. Borra and the Dark Fey stop Ingrith's escape.

Philip forges peace between the two sides, causing the Ulstead soldiers to stand down. Maleficent reverts to her fairy form and bestows her blessing upon Aurora and Philip. After receiving it from Lickspittle, Maleficent destroys the spindle and its curse, awakening John. As punishment, Ingrith is transformed into a goat by Maleficent, until she can embrace peace between the two peoples. After Aurora and Philip are wed, Maleficent returns to the Moors with the other Dark Fey, promising to return for the christening of Aurora and Philip's future child.

== Cast ==
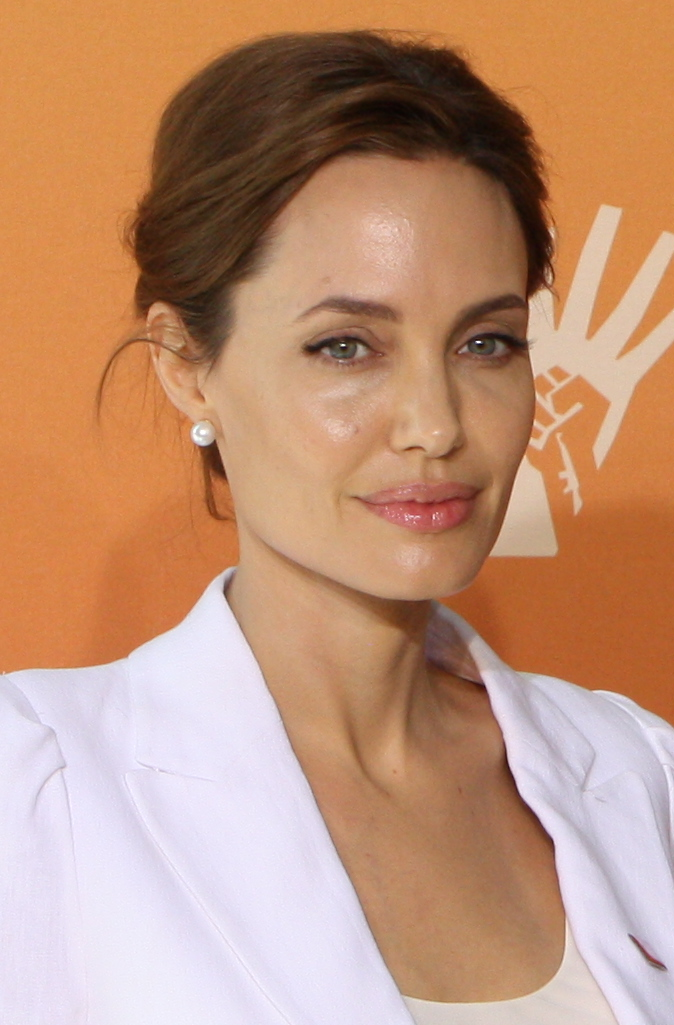
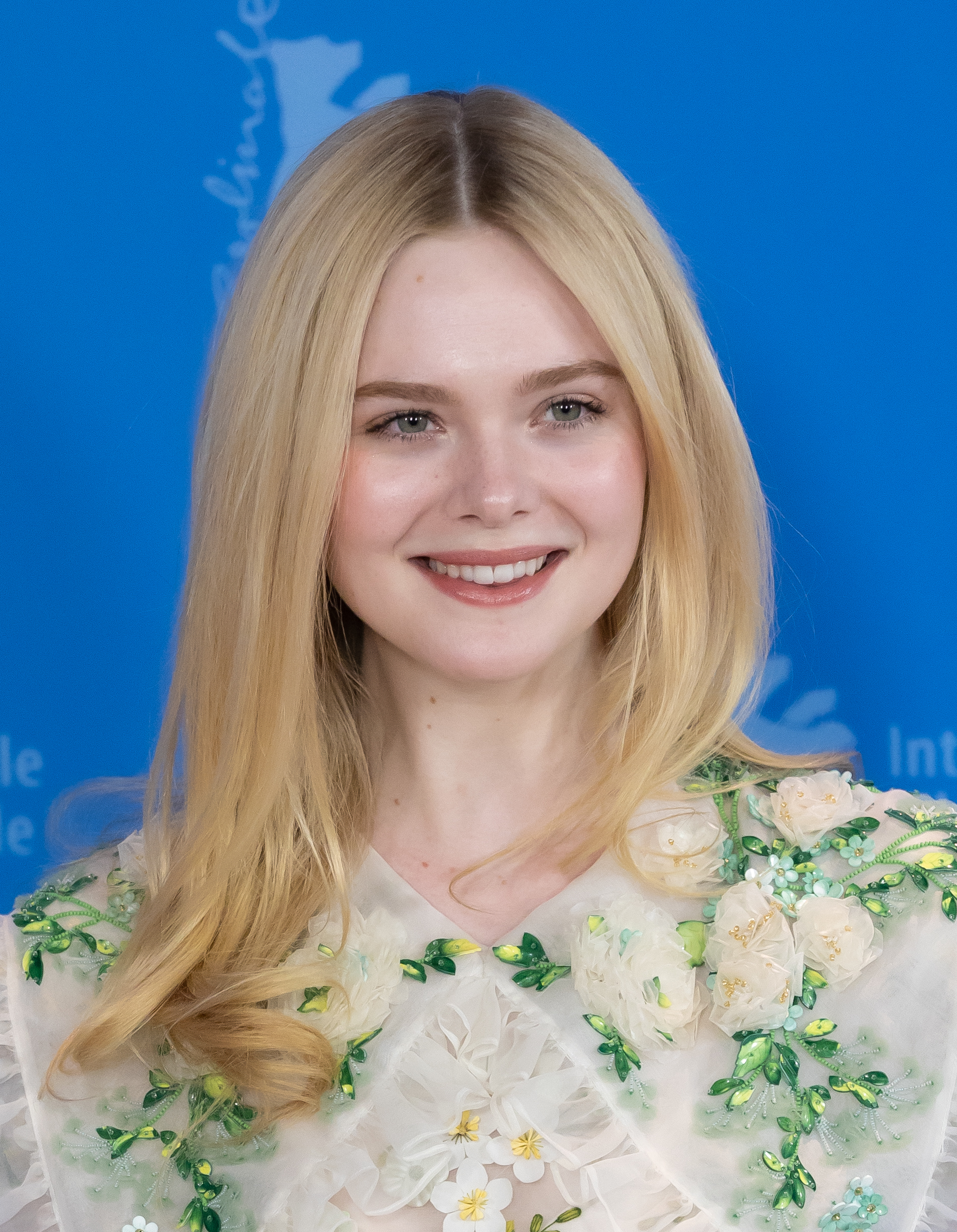
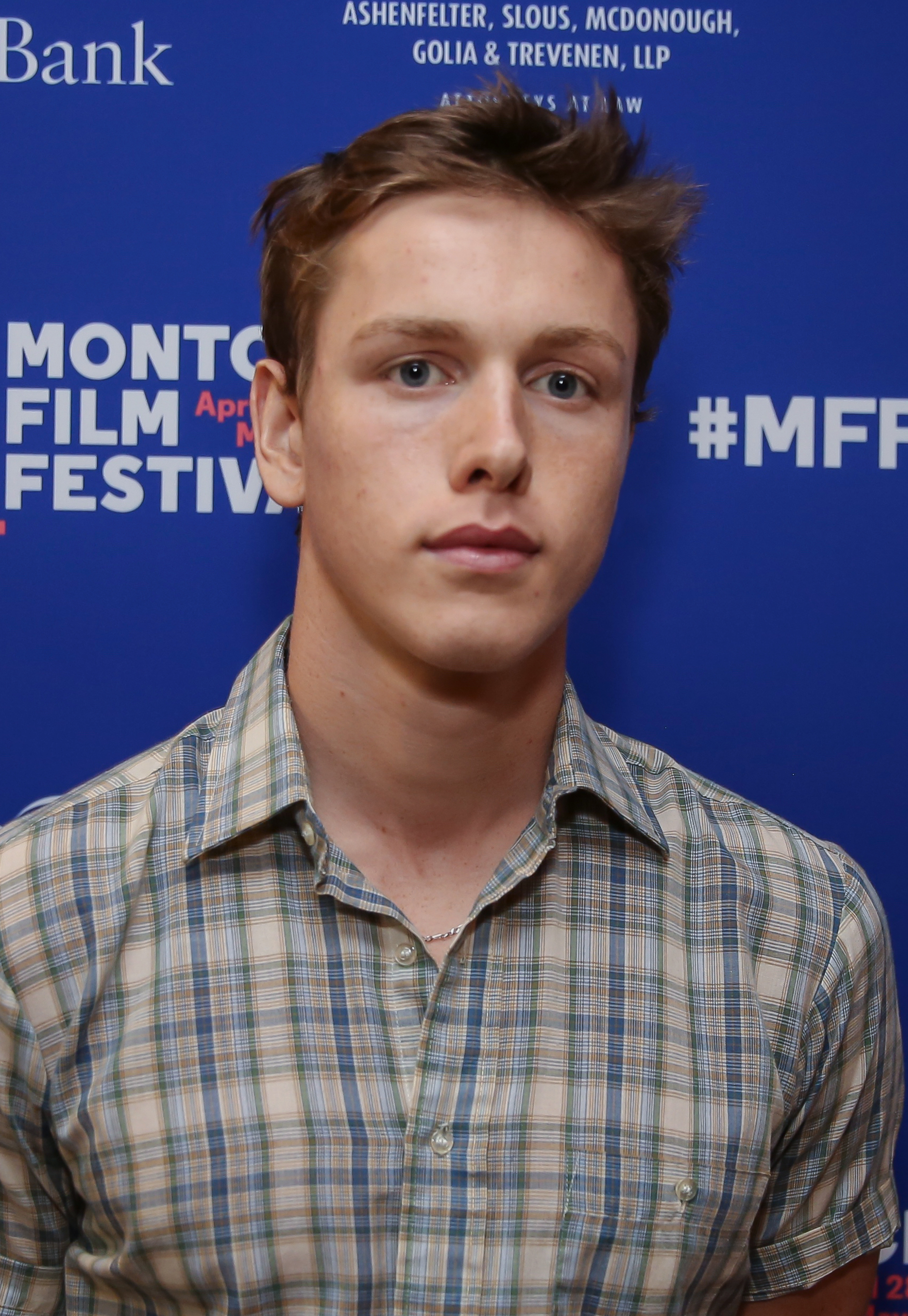
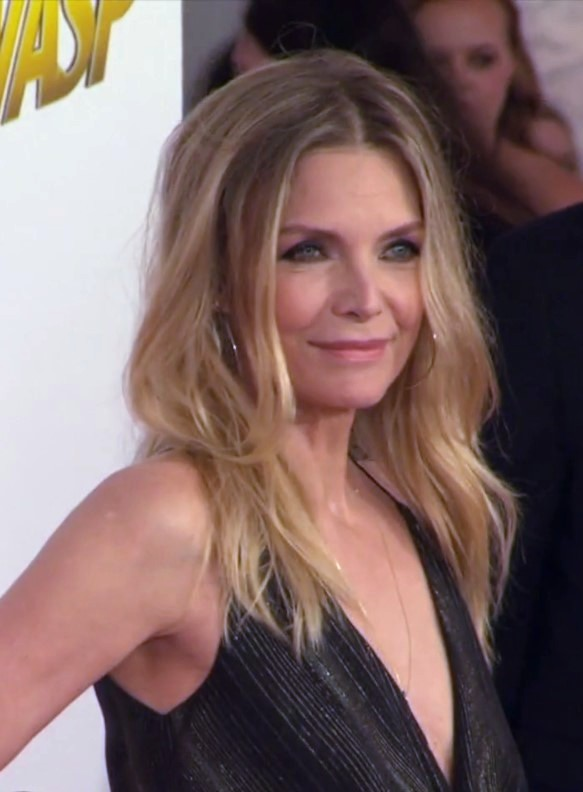
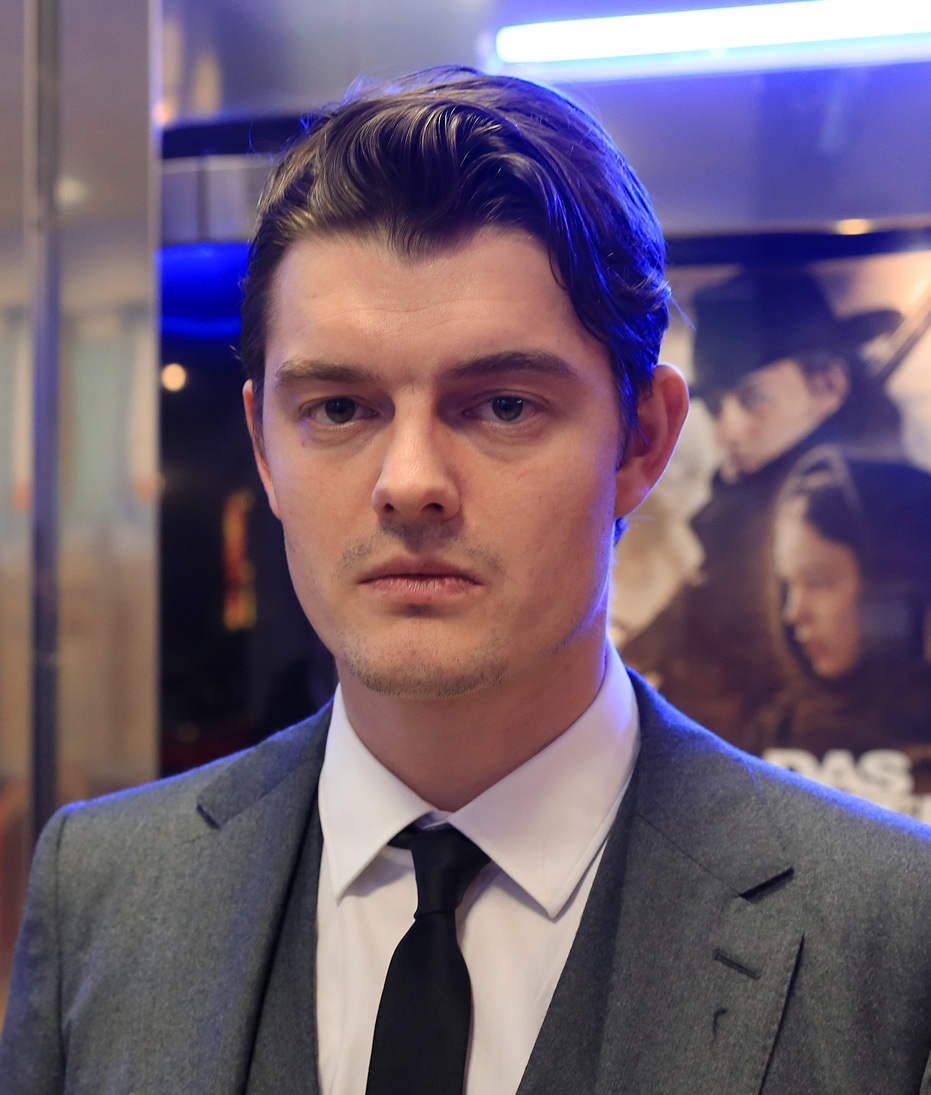
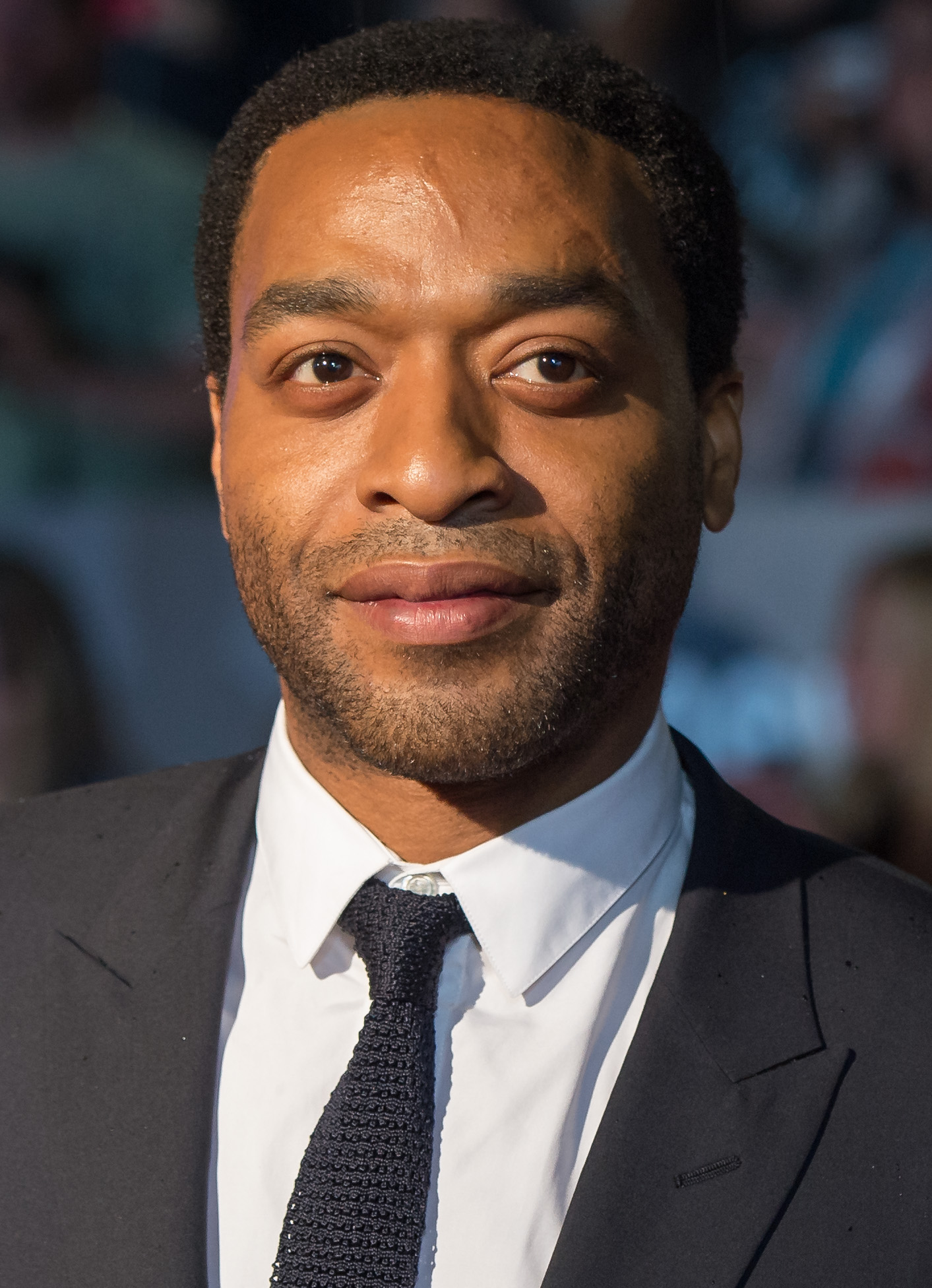
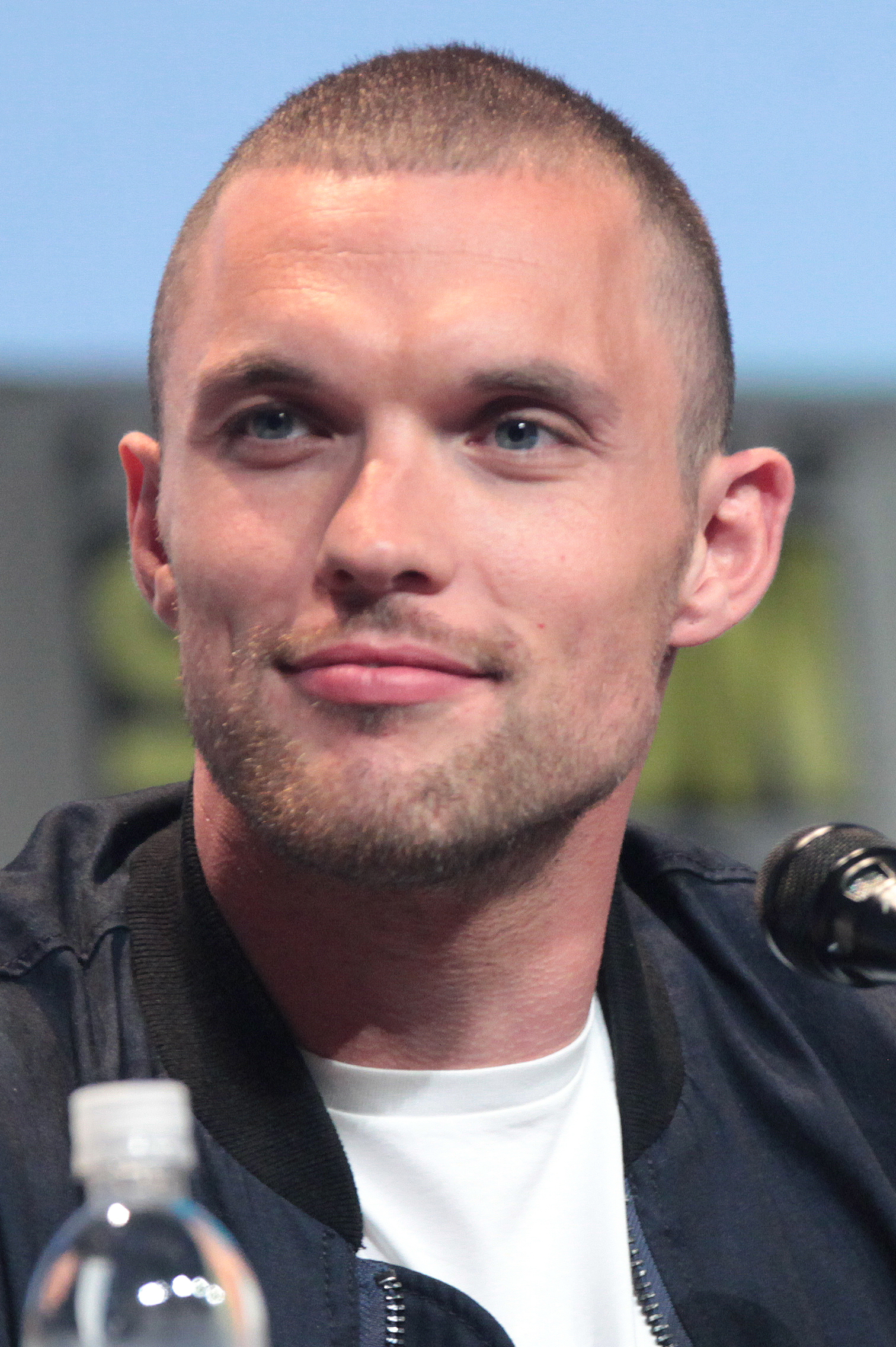
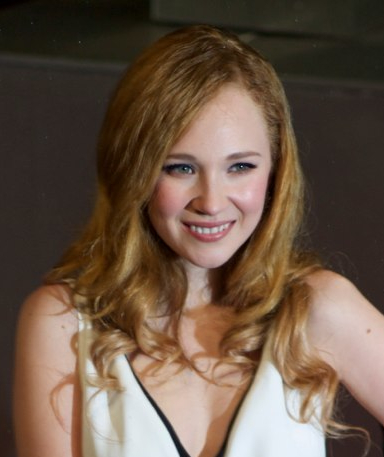
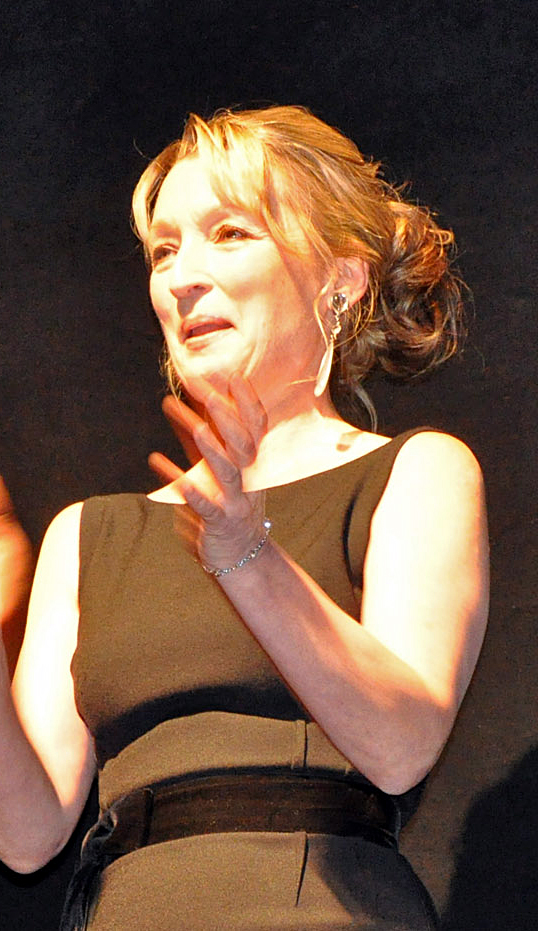
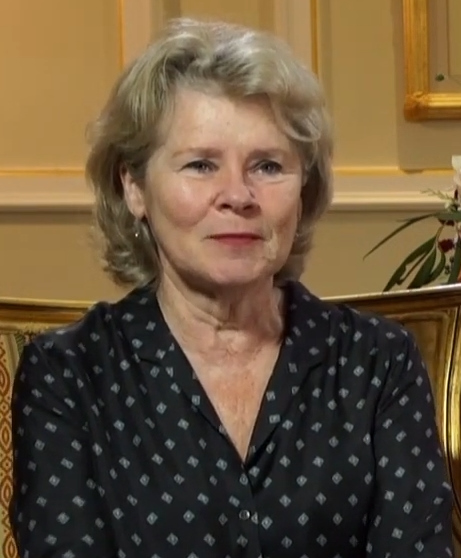
Top row: Angelina Jolie, Elle Fanning, Harris Dickinson, Michelle Pfeiffer, and Sam Riley play Maleficent, Aurora, Prince Philip, Queen Ingrith, and Diaval.
Bottom row: Chiwetel Ejiofor, Ed Skrein, Juno Temple, Leslie Manville, and Imelda Staunton play Conall, Borra, Thistlewit, Flittle, and Knotgrass.
- Angelina Jolie as Maleficent, a powerful Dark Fey, the former ruler of the Moors, Aurora's adoptive mother, and descendant of the Phoenix.
- Elle Fanning as Aurora, the current ruler of the Moors, Maleficent's adoptive daughter, and Prince Philip's love interest and later wife.
- Michelle Pfeiffer as Queen Ingrith, the power-hungry Queen of Ulstead, wife of King John and mother of Prince Philip, who despises both Maleficent and Aurora.
- Sam Riley as Diaval, Maleficent's shape-shifting raven companion.
- Chiwetel Ejiofor as Conall, the leader of Dark Fae that rescues Maleficent.
- Ed Skrein as Borra, a Dark Fae that leads the attack on Ulstead.
- Harris Dickinson as Prince Philip, the Prince of Ulstead, King John and Queen Ingrith's son, and Aurora's love interest and later husband. He was portrayed by Brenton Thwaites in the first film.
- Robert Lindsay as King John, the King of Ulstead, father of Prince Philip, and husband of Queen Ingrith. The character is briefly mentioned by Prince Philip in the first film.
- David Gyasi as Percival, the captain of the guards who works for the Ulstead royal family.
- Jenn Murray as Gerda, a woman who is loyal to Queen Ingrith.
- Juno Temple as the voice and motion-capture of Thistlewit, a green fairy.
- Lesley Manville as the voice and motion-capture of Flittle, a blue fairy.
- Imelda Staunton as the voice and motion-capture of Knotgrass, a red fairy.
- Judith Shekoni as Shrike, a Jungle Fae.
- Miyavi as Udo, a Tundra Fae.
- Kae Alexander as Ini, a Desert Fae.
- Warwick Davis as Lickspittle, a de-winged pixie who reluctantly works for Queen Ingrith.
- Emma Maclennon as the voice and motion-capture of Pinto, a hedgehog-like creature.
  - Maclennon also provides the voice and motion-capture of Button.
- Aline Mowat as the Narrator.
- Freddie Wise as Young Peasant.
- John Carew as Jungle Warrior Fae.
- Ia Östergren as Desert Warrior.

== Production ==
=== Development ===
On June 3, 2014, following the release of the first film, Angelina Jolie hinted that a sequel to Maleficent was a possibility. On June 15, 2015, Walt Disney Pictures announced that the sequel was in the works and that Linda Woolverton would return to write the screenplay for the film. On April 25, 2016, Disney officially confirmed Jolie's return as the title character. On August 29, 2017, Joe Roth was confirmed as returning as producer. In September 2017, Jolie stated that they "have been working on the script and this is going to be a really strong sequel." On October 3, 2017, Deadline reported that the film would be directed by Joachim Rønning and it would start filming in the first quarter of 2018.

=== Casting ===
In April 2018, Ed Skrein was cast in the film to play a dark fae, with Elle Fanning returning to play Princess Aurora from the previous film. Michelle Pfeiffer was also added as a character described as a queen, later clarified to be an evil queen named Queen Ingrith.

In May 2018, it was announced that Harris Dickinson would replace Brenton Thwaites in the role of Prince Philip, due to scheduling conflicts with the latter actor. Later it was also confirmed that Jenn Murray, David Gyasi, Chiwetel Ejiofor and Robert Lindsay had also joined the cast. Sam Riley, Imelda Staunton, Juno Temple and Lesley Manville were also confirmed to reprise their roles from the prior film. In June 2018 Judith Shekoni joined the cast.

=== Costume design ===
Ellen Mirojnick, who had previously worked on The Greatest Showman, Starship Troopers, and Fatal Attraction, was in charge of creating costumes for the film. Mirojnick drew inspiration fine art and paintings, as well as nature and the Renaissance era.

=== Filming ===
Principal photography began on May 29, 2018, at Pinewood Studios in Buckinghamshire, England. Filming wrapped on August 24, 2018.

=== Visual effects ===
The visual effects were provided by The Moving Picture Company and Mill Film, which was supervised by Jessica Norman, Damien Stumpf, Brian Litson, Ferran Domenech, and Laurent Gillet, with Gary Brozenich serving as the Overall Supervisor.

According to Brozenich, the majority of the film's effects were for the enormous battle sequences taking place in and around Ulstead's castle and Queen Ingrith's creation, a mix of fairy dust and iron which turns into a red powder-like substance that destroys the creatures in the film, and is brilliantly realized on-screen as explosions of red smoke in the sky.

When visualizing the film, Director Joachim Rønning pictured the red dust bombs exploding over Berlin during World War II. The wings for Maleficent—who had three different looks, were created with CG effects in post-production, but the simulated flying was completed during principal photography. He and the team were determined to make all the flying sequences look as effortless and real as possible, while keeping the actors safe. The actors wore a tuning fork rig that attached to the actor's hips and was controlled by operators off set. This gave the actors the ability to hover and dive, which makes the action look very fluid and natural.

== Music ==
On May 22, 2019, it was revealed that the film's score would be composed by Geoff Zanelli, replacing James Newton Howard from the previous film. The film marks Zanelli and Rønning's second collaboration, after Pirates of the Caribbean: Dead Men Tell No Tales. Zanelli said that "the storytelling in Maleficent: Mistress of Evil is fantastic", for which he said that "writing [the film's] score is a dream come true". On September 20, 2019, the song "You Can't Stop the Girl" by Bebe Rexha, from the film's soundtrack, was released as a single. The score album was released on October 18, 2019 by Walt Disney Records.

== Release ==
=== Marketing ===
The first teaser trailer for the film was released on May 13, 2019. On July 8, 2019, the official trailer for the film was released, in which Ejiofor's character was revealed. On September 4, 2019, Disney released a behind-the-scenes featurette in which the cast talk about the evolution of Maleficent's personality and some of the moral challenges each of the characters face in the story. On September 10, Disney released a black and white sneak peek detailing the makeup process to transform Angelina Jolie into Maleficent.

=== Theatrical ===
Maleficent: Mistress of Evil was theatrically released on October 18, 2019 by Walt Disney Studios Motion Pictures, moving up from the film's previously announced date of May 29, 2020.

=== Home media ===
Maleficent: Mistress of Evil was released by Walt Disney Studios Home Entertainment on Digital HD on December 31, 2019, followed by a 4K Ultra HD, Blu-ray and DVD release on January 14, 2020. Maleficent: Mistress of Evil was released on Disney+ on May 15, 2020.

The film ranked as No. 1 on the NPD VideoScan First Alert chart and the dedicated Blu-ray Disc sales chart for the week ending January 18, 2020. Blu-ray formats accounted for 75% of its first-week sales, with 4K Ultra HD making up 10% of total unit sales. Maleficent: Mistress of Evil ranked as No. 9 on the top-selling disc releases of 2020, based on combined DVD and Blu-ray unit sales as reported by NPD Group's VideoScan tracking service. The film debuted at No. 2 on the January 2020 sales chart, behind Joker, following its January 14, 2020 home media release. In the United Kingdom, the film ranked as No. 1 on the Official Film Chart following its DVD, Blu-ray, and 4K UHD release. It sold over 100,000 copies in its debut week, surpassing Joker, which dropped to No. 2.

== Reception ==
=== Box office ===
Maleficent: Mistress of Evil has grossed $113.9 million in the United States and Canada, and $377.8 million in other territories, for a worldwide total of $491.7 million. It was estimated the film would need to gross $400–475 million worldwide in order to break-even, and around $500 million in order to turn a profit.

In the United States and Canada, the film was released alongside Zombieland: Double Tap and was initially projected to gross $45–50 million from 3,790 theaters in its opening weekend. However, after making $12.5 million on its first day (including $2.3 million from Thursday night previews), estimates were lowered to $38 million. It went on to debut to $36.9 million, finishing first at the box office but marking a 47% decline from the $69.4 million opening of the first film. The lower-than-expected opening was blamed on the five years between installments, mixed critical reviews and competition from fellow releases. In its second weekend, the film made $19.4 million, retaining the top spot at the box office, before falling to third place in its third weekend with $13.1 million.

=== Critical response ===
The review aggregator website Rotten Tomatoes reported the film holds an approval rating of 40% based on 261 reviews, with an average rating of 5.1/10. The site's critics consensus reads: "While it's far from cursed, Maleficent: Mistress of Evil too rarely supports its impressive cast and visuals with enough magical storytelling to justify its existence." On Metacritic, the film has a weighted average score of 43 out of 100 based on 40 critics, indicating "mixed or average reviews". Audiences polled by CinemaScore gave the film an average grade of "A" on an A+ to F scale, the same score as the first film, while those at PostTrak gave it 4.5 out of 5 stars and a 59% "definite recommend".

Forbes film critic Scott Mendelson called it the "best 'live-action Disney fairy tale' flick since Pete's Dragon," a 1977 live-action Disney flick that got the remake treatment in 2016.

Los Angeles Times film critic Justin Chang calls the film (written by returning scribe Linda Woolverton and A Beautiful Day in the Neighborhood co-writers Noah Harpster and Micah Fitzerman-Blue) an "enjoyably deranged" continuation of the first movie thanks to Jolie's commitment to the character's grim quirks, though he ultimately notes the "flat dialogue, overblown battles, and cloying CGI critters" weigh down the film's merits. IndieWire's Eric Kohn adds that Jolie's natural charm adds so much "delicious flamboyance to this striking villainess that she outshines the latest heavy-handed Disney refashioning" before quipping that "only the world's biggest movie star could upstage her own movie with each fearsome scowl."

=== Accolades ===
Award	Date of ceremony	Category	Recipient(s)	Result	Ref.
Academy Awards	February 9, 2020	Best Makeup and Hairstyling	Paul Gooch, Arjen Tuiten and David White	Nominated	
Art Directors Guild Awards	February 1, 2020	Best Production Design in Fantasy Film	Patrick Tatopoulos	Nominated	
British Film Designers Guild	January 1, 2020	Best Production Design in Fantasy Film	Patrick Tatopoulos & Dominic Capon	Nominated	
Costume Designers Guild Awards	January 28, 2020	Excellence in Sci-Fi/Fantasy Film	Ellen Mirojnick	Won	
Make-Up Artists and Hair Stylists Guild	January 11, 2020	Best Period and/or Character Hair Styling	Audrey Stern	Nominated	
Saturn Awards	October 26, 2021	Best Fantasy Film Release	Maleficent: Mistress of Evil	Nominated	
Saturn Awards	October 26, 2021	Best Production Design	Patrick Tatopoulos	Nominated	
Saturn Awards	October 26, 2021	Best Make-up	Arjen Tuiten and David White	Nominated	

== Future ==
In September 2021, it was reported that the first draft of an untitled Maleficent film had already been written at that time, by Linda Woolverton and Evan Spiliotopoulos. In November, during an interview about Jolie's film Eternals on the podcast D23 Inside Disney, the actress hinted at her return as Maleficent in a third film.

A third Maleficent film was officially announced to be in development in December 2023, as Angelina Jolie confirmed that she would reprise the role of Maleficent in a Wall Street Journal interview and also stated that the film was in development.

On March 26, 2025, Deadline confirmed that screenwriter Linda Woolverton is currently in charge of writing the third installment of Maleficent, which confirms that the movie is still actively in development.

== Novelization ==
A tie-in novelization of the film was published by Disney Publishing Worldwide on October 8, 2019.
