= Sleeping Beauty (franchise) =

Disney media franchise

Disney's Sleeping Beauty
- Original work: Sleeping Beauty (1959)
- Owner: The Walt Disney Company
- Years: 1959-present
- Based on: La Belle au bois dormant by Charles Perrault

Films and television
- Films: Sleeping Beauty (1959); Maleficent (2014); Maleficent: Mistress of Evil (2019)
- Television series: Once Upon a Time (2011–2018)^{*}
- Animated series: House of Mouse (2001–2003)^{*}; Sofia the First (2012–2018)^{*}
- Television special: The Peter Tchaikovsky Story
- Television films: Descendants (2015)^{*}; Descendants 2 (2017)^{*}; Descendants 3 (2019)^{*}; Descendants: The Rise of Red (2024)^{*}
- Direct-to-video: Disney Princess Enchanted Tales: Follow Your Dreams (2007; Keys to the Kingdom segment)

Games
- Video games: Kingdom Hearts (2002–present)^{*}; Disney Princess: Magical Jewels (2007)^{*}; Disney Infinity (2014–2016)^{*}

Audio
- Original music: "Once Upon a Dream"

Miscellaneous
- Theme park attractions: Sleeping Beauty Castle (1955–present, Disneyland; 2005–2018, Hong Kong Disneyland); Le Château de la Belle au Bois Dormant (1992–present)
- ^{*} Characters and/or settings from this franchise appear as part of a crossover

Sleeping Beauty is a Disney media franchise that began in 1959 with the theatrical release of the animated film Sleeping Beauty, based on the homonymous fairy tale.

== Films ==
=== Sleeping Beauty (1959) ===
Sleeping Beauty is a 1959 American animated musical fantasy film produced by Walt Disney based on The Sleeping Beauty by Charles Perrault. In 2019, Sleeping Beauty was selected for preservation in the National Film Registry by the Library of Congress for being "culturally, historically, or aesthetically significant".

=== Maleficent films ===
==== Maleficent (2014) ====
Maleficent is a live-action adaptation/remake of 1959 animated film but tells the story from the eponymous antagonist portrayed by Angelina Jolie.

==== Maleficent: Mistress of Evil (2019) ====
Maleficent: Mistress of Evil is the sequel of the 2014 film Maleficent, continuing the story of the first film. The film was released on October 18, 2019.

==== Untitled third Maleficent film (TBA) ====
In September 2021, a third Maleficent film was confirmed to be in early development, with Angelina Jolie expected to return.

== Direct-to-video and television films ==
=== Keys to the Kingdom (2007) ===
As a segment of Disney Princess Enchanted Tales: Follow Your Dreams, "Keys to the Kingdom" focuses on Princess Aurora, who reigns the kingdom in the absence of her parents, and Merryweather gives Aurora her wand in case she needs any assistance and warns her to be very careful with it.

=== Descendants series ===
==== Descendants (2015) ====
Descendants is a live-action Disney Channel Original Movie based on the lives of the children of various Disney heroes and villains when they attend the same prep school. The film focused mainly on Mal, daughter of Maleficent, who is the main antagonist of the movie. The film also includes Audrey, Aurora and Phillip's daughter, and Queen Leah also makes a minor appearance.

==== Descendants 2 (2017) ====
Descendants 2 is the sequel to the 2015 film Descendants. The film again focuses on Mal, however Maleficent only appears briefly transformed into a lizard (staying in this form in the previous movie). Audrey, Aurora and Prince Phillip's daughter, being only mentioned in the film.

==== Descendants 3 (2019) ====
A third film in the Descendants franchise was released in mid 2019. It featured Mal and Audrey, the daughters of Maleficent and Aurora respectively, with Queen Leah returning in a supporting role. In the film, Mal and Audrey fulfill roles reversed from their mothers in Sleeping Beauty, with Mal acting as the heroine of the story, while Audrey acts as the main antagonist.

==== Descendants: The Rise of Red (2024) ====
A fourth film from the Descendants franchise was released in mid 2024. In the film, Maleficent is seen in her teenage years.

== Television series ==
=== House of Mouse (2001–2003) ===
Disney's animated television series House of Mouse included many Disney animated character cameos, including the Sleeping Beauty characters. Characters from Sleeping Beauty also make minor appearances in the direct-to-video films based in the show, Mickey's Magical Christmas: Snowed in at the House of Mouse and Mickey's House of Villains.

=== Sofia the First (2012–2018) ===
Flora, Fauna, and Merryweather appear as recurring characters in the American animated television series Sofia the First, as the headmistresses of Royal Prep.

The series features characters from the Disney Princess franchise, with Aurora appearing in the 24th episode of the series, "Holiday in Enchancia".

== Theme park attractions ==
=== Sleeping Beauty Castle ===
Sleeping Beauty Castle is a fairy tale castle at the center of Disneyland and Disneyland Park (Paris) and formerly at Hong Kong Disneyland. It is based on the late-19th century Neuschwanstein Castle in Bavaria, Germany.

=== Le Château de la Belle au Bois Dormant ===
Le Château de la Belle au Bois Dormant (English: The Castle of the Sleeping Beauty) is the fairy tale castle at the centre of Disneyland Paris and is a continuation of Sleeping Beauty Castle.

== Video games ==
=== Kingdom Hearts series (2002–present) ===
Maleficent is one of the main antagonists in the Kingdom Hearts video game series, appearing in most entries in the series. Aurora appears for first time in Kingdom Hearts as one of the Seven Princesses of Heart. Flora, Fauna and Merryweather, as well as Maleficent's raven, appear for the first time in Kingdom Hearts II. Kingdom Hearts Birth by Sleep include a world based on the animation film, Enchanted Dominion, which includes for the first time in the games to Prince Phillip and Maleficent's goons.

=== Disney Princess: Magical Jewels (2007) ===
Aurora appears in Disney Princess: Magical Jewels as a playable character.

=== Disney Infinity series (2014–2016) ===
The 2014 live-action version of Maleficent is a playable character in the Disney Infinity video game series, beginning with Disney Infinity 2.0 (2015). As with the other playable characters in the game, a tie-in figure for Maleficent was also released.

=== Disney Magic Kingdoms (2016) ===
Maleficent appears as a non-player character and the main antagonist in the video game Disney Magic Kingdoms, where she casts a curse on the titular Kingdom. Aurora, Prince Phillip, Flora, Fauna and Merryweather appear as playable characters in the main storyline of the game.

== Other ==
The franchise's titular protagonist, Aurora, is part of the characters in the Disney Princess franchise. The main antagonist of the franchise, Maleficent, is included as a regular character of the Disney Villains franchise, while her sidekick raven Diablo also has minor recurring appearances in said franchise.

== Cast and characters ==
List indicators

This section includes characters who will appear or have appeared in more than two films in the series.

- An empty grey cell indicates the character was not in the film, or that the character's official presence has not yet been confirmed.
- ^{O} indicates an older version of the character.
- ^{V} indicates a voice-only role.
- ^{Y} indicates a younger version of the character.
- ^{D} indicates an appearance as a character's voice in a deleted song..
- ^{S} indicates an appearance as a character's singing voice..

Overview of cast and characters in the Sleeping Beauty franchise
| Characters | Animated films | | Live-action films | |
| Characters | Sleeping Beauty | Keys to the Kingdom | Maleficent | Maleficent: Mistress of Evil |
| Characters | 1959 | 2007 | 2014 | 2019 |
|---|---|---|---|---|
| Aurora | Mary Costa | Erin Torpey Cassidy Ladden^{S} | Elle Fanning Vivienne Jolie-Pitt^{Y} Eleanor Worthington Cox^{Y} Janet McTeer^{O}^{V} | Elle Fanning |
| Maleficent | Eleanor Audley | | Angelina Jolie Isobelle Molloy^{Y} Ella Purnell^{Y} | Angelina Jolie |
| Flora Knotgrass in Maleficent | Verna Felton | Barbara Dirikson | Imelda Staunton | Imelda Staunton |
| Fauna Flittle in Maleficent | Barbara Jo Allen | Russi Taylor | Lesley Manville | Lesley Manville |
| Merryweather Thistlewit in Maleficent | Barbara Luddy Colleen Collins^{D} | Tress MacNeille | Juno Temple | Juno Temple |
| Prince Phillip | Bill Shirley | Roger Craig Smith | Brenton Thwaites | Harris Dickinson |
| King Stefan | Taylor Holmes Hans Conried^{D} | Corey Burton | Sharlto Copley Michael Higgins^{Y} Jackson Bews^{Y} | |
| Queen Leah Queen Leila in Maleficent | Verna Felton | Barbara Dirikson | Hannah New | |
| King Hubert King John in Maleficent | Bill Thompson | Jeff Bennett | | Robert Lindsay |
| Diablo the Raven Diaval in Maleficent | Candy Candido | | Sam Riley | Sam Riley |
