= Sorcerers of the Magic Kingdom =

Defunct interactive game

Sorcerers of the Magic Kingdom was an interactive game found in the Magic Kingdom at the Walt Disney World Resort in Florida. The premise of the game is that Hades is trying to take over the Magic Kingdom and Merlin is recruiting park guests as new apprentices. The player, in the position of new apprentice sorcerers helps Merlin the Wizard thwart Hades' plan by attacking notorious Disney villains that can be found throughout the park's themed lands (except Tomorrowland) by using special spell cards. (see Cards)

The game was shut down in January 2021 as a result of "changes in guest use of mobile technology" and a general decline in interest, with the game's final day being January 24.

== Story ==
Having grown tired of the dreary scenery in the Underworld, Hades decides to make the Magic Kingdom his new summer home, but Merlin would be able to easily repel an invasion with the power of his magic crystal. In an attempt to outwit Merlin, Hades sends Pain and Panic to steal the crystal, but their bumbling leads to the crystal being shattered into eight pieces that scatter to each area of the Magic Kingdom. Merlin recruits the player to help him find the pieces of his crystal, giving them magical cards with the Sorcerer's Crest on them; the crest itself is used when specifically needed.

Needing help himself, Hades revives Ursula, Maleficent, Scar and Dr. Facilier, promising them second lives in exchange for a crystal fragment. The two witches have schemes of their own to usurp power. Posing as Boss Teal - Underworld Crime Boss, Lord Indigo of the East Underworld Trading company and Lazuli, god of the underworld, Hades also promises Cruella, Ratcliffe and Yzma something they each want in exchange for help; the 99 puppies, Pocahontas' land, and to be empress of Adventureland respectively. Under the alias and disguise "Prince Azure", Hades also forces genie Jafar into helping. Though he meant to guide the player throughout the kingdom, Merlin forced to fight off Hades' lesser pawns that are trying to invade. Therefore, the player's guidance comes from a foe of each villain: Sebastian, Merryweather, Rafiki, Mama Odie, Pongo, Pocahontas, Kuzco, and Genie.

When all the villains are defeated, the magic crystal is restored, but Hades isn't one to give up; he sends in Chernabog - his "Number 1 Guy", but was only a distraction to let Pain and Panic try stealing the crystal again; they predictably fail. Deciding to use brute force, Hades amasses his army of the dead, which is led by the other villains. Through Merlin's guidance, the player uses the magic of the Sorcerer's Crest to seal Hades and the villains inside the mystic crystal. The crystal is then returned to Merlin's study. Inside the crystal, Hades is left to wonder what went wrong with his plans.

== Gameplay ==
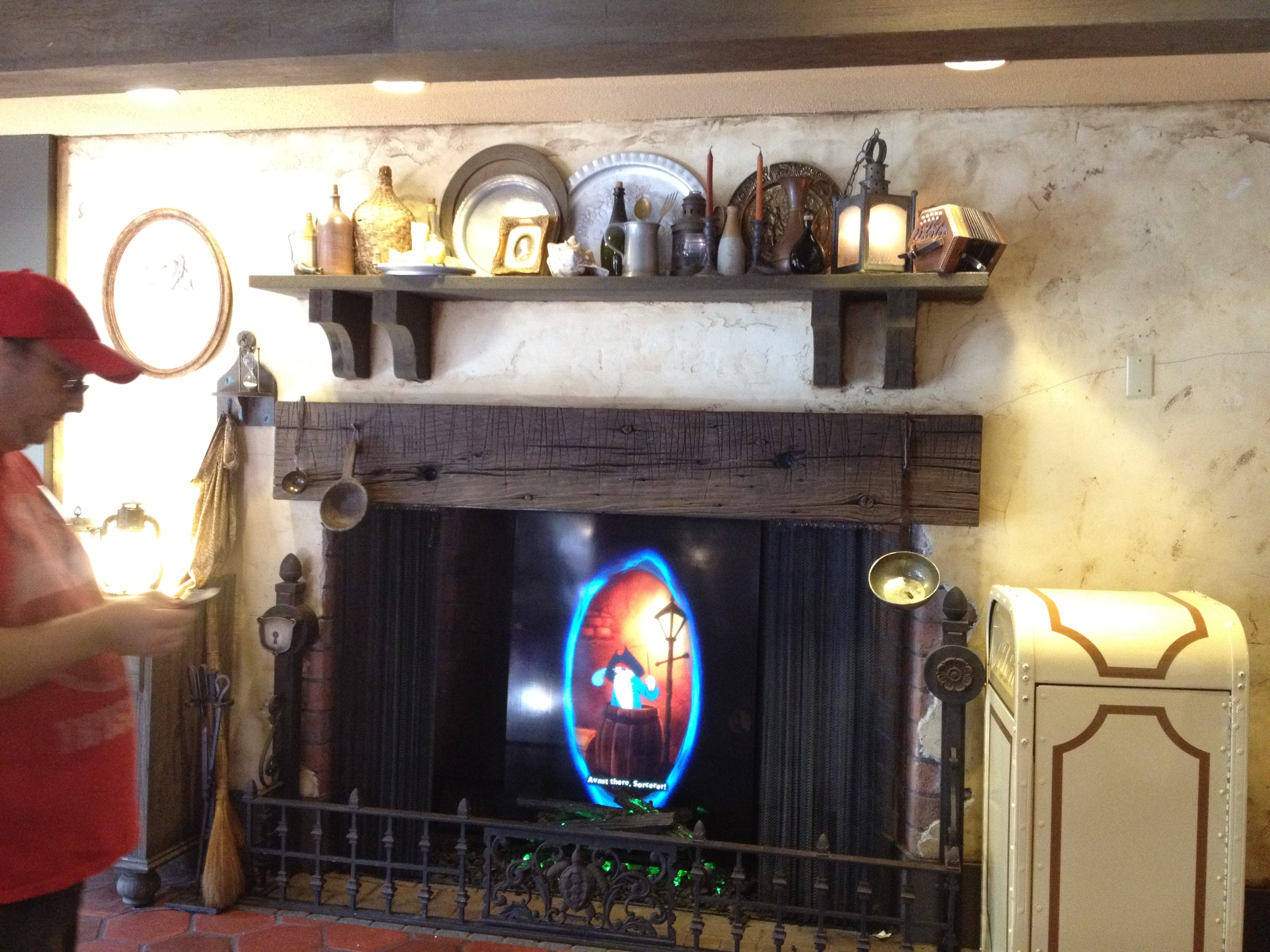
One of the portals of the game in the Tortuga Tavern restaurant in Adventureland.

There was no additional charge to play the game, unless players opted to buy cards or the card binder at the Emporium or the Frontier Trading Post. Players began by going to the Fire Station on Main Street USA to get the game set up and linked to a magic band or entry key. Once linked, players had to keep their original band or card in order to save their progress.

First-time players were given a thorough run-through of the game at the Fire Station. There was formerly a card distribution location behind the Christmas shop in Liberty Square, but this location has since closed.

Once set up, players were given a set of cards and a map, and were told where to begin. The game was played at portals marked on the map in Main Street, Adventureland, Frontierland/Liberty Square, and Fantasyland. Tomorrowland did not have any portals. Each land with portals had five, though construction limited this number.

Players activated a portal by placing their key (band/card) next to the keyhole. Once activated, an animation played and players followed the story from there. The animation was captioned, so hearing-impaired guests could play. Players 'fought' the villains by showing their spell cards when prompted to 'Cast your Spell'. Some interactions required the use of 'Sorcerer's Crest', which was on the back of the card. There were cameras in the wall by the animation screens that read the cards as they were presented. Lighting and angle/distance affected the read, which could cause an unexpected mechanical level of difficulty. Regardless of the outcome of the 'fight', at the conclusion, players were directed to another location symbol which matched a location on the map. If players travelled to the wrong portal, the portal notified them and re-displayed the correct location of the portal.

There were ten main villains and additional associated henchmen. Each had strengths and weaknesses based on the type of cards used.

There were three levels of difficulty: easy, medium, and hard. Easy and Medium followed the strength and weakness listing, but by 2013, Hard was changed to a random strength and weakness per villain.

There was no time limit, and the game could be played during peak ride-wait times or as a specific activity.

You could also quit after you defeated Cruella De Vill, but if you wished to continue, the game (see Story) continued.

=== Special Edition Cards ===
During Mickey's Not-So-Scary Halloween Party and Mickey's Very Merry Christmas Party, all guests are eligible to receive a complimentary special edition holiday-themed card. Only one is allowed per guest and they can be picked up at the Fire Station in Town Square.

== Cards ==
The Spell Cards in the game were divided into nine different spell classes: Toy, Machine, Animal, Fairy, Hero, Princess, Warrior, Monster, and Mystic, along with seven different types of attacks: Charming, Energy, Gross, Quick, Strong, Flying, and Wishful.

A card's rarity is classified by the symbol in the bottom left corner, right above the number out of 70. A Planet means that the card is common, a Crescent Moon means it is uncommon, a Star means it is rare and a Lightning Bolt means it is ultra rare.

Cards 61-70 started to be re-distributed via booster packs beginning in August 2012. These booster packs feature seven cards, tokens, and one of four gameboards for a home version of the game.

Also, beginning with the 2012 Mickey's Not-So-Scary Halloween and Very Merry Christmas parties, special limited edition spell cards exclusive to those events started to be produced.

Spell cards
Number	Rarity	Spell name	Character	Other characters	Franchise	Spell class	Attack type	Attack	Boost	Shield	Rhyme
1/70	Star	Apprentice Mickey's Broomsticks	Sorcerer's Apprentice Mickey Mouse	Broomsticks	Fantasia	Mystic	Charming	4	1	1	Without the touch of human hands, They're marching to their own commands.
2/70	Star	Belle's Mountain Blizzard	Belle		Beauty and the Beast	Princess	Wishful	2	0	3	Soon you'll be a mighty wizard Should you just survive this blizzard.
3/70	Star	Buzz Lightyear's Astro Blasters	Buzz Lightyear	Little Green Men	Toy Story	Toy	Energy	2	2	2	When trouble gets quite out of hand, Call your friends at Star Command.
4/70	Star	Doris's Bowler Hat Attack	DOR-15		Meet the Robinsons	Machine	Quick	2	1	3	A hat! A hat! Imagine that! When these start flying, you'd best scat.
5/70	Star	EVE's Laser Blast	EVE		WALL-E	Machine	Energy	5	1	0	If the darkness you must face, Bring laser beams from outer space.
6/70	Star	Fa Mulan's Dragon Canon	Mulan	Mushu	Mulan	Princess	Flying	4	1	0	Should you make a bold attack, Be sure to load it from the back.
7/70	Star	Flynn Rider's Flying Frying Pan	Flynn Rider	Maximus	Tangled	Warrior	Flying	1	0	4	You might get a massive bruise, When pan-demonium ensues.
8/70	Star	King Triton's Trident	King Triton		The Little Mermaid	Warrior	Charming	2	1	2	If one sharp point will leave you sore, Three will poke you even more.
9/70	Star	Lythos's Rock Titan Boulder Throw	Lythos		Hercules	Monster	Strong	5	0	1	All the land erupts in panic At a fusillade titanic.
10/70	Star	Maurice's Wood Chopper	Maurice		Beauty and the Beast	Hero	Gross	4	1	0	How much wood would a woodsman chop? I'm guessing he might never stop.
11/70	Star	Maximus's Horseshoes	Maximus		Tangled	Animal	Quick	1	0	4	Silver horseshoes bring you luck, But not if in your head they're stuck.
12/70	Star	Merlin's Fireball	Merlin		The Sword in the Stone	Mystic	Energy	5	0	1	If sorcery you would acquire, Don't get too close to balls of fire.
13/70	Star	Monstro's Water Spout	Monstro		Pinocchio	Animal	Gross	5	0	0	Your thirst will be forever quenched, Though after you'll be sorely drenched.
14/70	Star	Nibs's Neverland Assault	Nibs	The Twins	Peter Pan	Hero	Quick	4	0	1	Throw the axes, clubs, and stones Enough to bruise a pirate's bones.
15/70	Star	Rapunzel's Hair Whip	Rapunzel	Pascal	Tangled	Princess	Quick	5	0	0	This is how a girl expresses Her emotions through her tresses.
16/70	Star	Robin Hood's Magic Arrow	Robin Hood		Robin Hood	Warrior	Flying	5	0	0	If with merry men you'd go, Be polite and take a bow.
17/70	Star	Simba's Roar	Simba		The Lion King	Animal	Quick	3	1	1	Beware the sound that shakes the trees And brings the jungle to its knees.
18/70	Star	The Fairy Godmother's Pumpkin Bash	The Fairy Godmother	Jaq	Cinderella	Fairy	Quick	3	0	3	Bibbity bobbity bibbity boo! A spate of pumpkins falls on you!
19/70	Star	The Giant's Giant Stomp	Willie the Giant		Fun and Fancy Free	Monster	Strong	4	1	1	Stomp the castle! Crush the town! What's built up will soon come down.
20/70	Star	Tinker Bell's Pixie Dust	Tinker Bell		Disney Fairies	Fairy	Charming	6	0	0	With their magic dust so charming, Fairies can be quite disarming.
21/70	Star	Violet's Force Fields	Violet Parr		The Incredibles	Hero	Energy	1	0	4	Just because you cannot see it Doesn't mean you shouldn't flee it
22/70	Star	Woody's Cowboy Lasso	Woody	Slinky Dog	Toy Story	Toy	Quick	2	0	4	Twirl yer rope just like a cowboy. You'll be catchin' crooks and how, boy.
23/70	Moon	Aladdin's Lamp	Aladdin	Genie's Arm	Aladdin	Warrior	Charming	1	2	2	Rub my lamp and out will fly Fire and smoke to fill the sky.
24/70	Moon	Bolt's Super Bark	Bolt	Rhino	Bolt	Animal	Quick	3	0	2	BARK! GURR-RUFF! YIP YIP! AROOOO! That's quite the canine ballyhoo.
25/70	Moon	Cinderella's Magic Ribbon	Cinderella	Jaq, Birds	Cinderella	Princess	Wishful	4	0	1	A villain may be loath to think That he's beribboned all in pink.
26/70	Moon	Colonel Hathi's Righteous Stomp	Colonel Hathi	Hathi Jr., other elephants	The Jungle Book	Animal	Strong	4	1	0	You can make a fine example Out of those you choose to trample.
27/70	Moon	Eeyore's Gloomy Cloud	Eeyore		Winnie the Pooh	Toy	Wishful	2	1	3	Oh bother. This disturbs me greatly. At least we've not had earthquakes lately.
28/70	Moon	Frozone's Ice Blast	Frozone		The Incredibles	Hero	Energy	3	2	0	When freezing foes of ill repute, Wear long-johns 'neath your supersuit.
29/70	Moon	Lightning McQueen's Ka-Chow	Lightning McQueen		Cars	Machine	Quick	4	1	1	When that trouble comes a-knocking, This response is something shocking.
30/70	Moon	Mickey's Magic Beans	Mickey Mouse		Fun and Fancy Free	Hero	Wishful	2	1	2	A giant can be dark and Grimm, And he won't like you "stalking" him.
31/70	Moon	Mike's Grand Entrance	Mike Wazowski	James "Sulley" Sullivan	Monsters, Inc.	Monster	Strong	3	2	1	And if behind the door you hide, Beware what's on the other side.
32/70	Moon	Pinocchio's Sawdust Blast	Pinocchio		Pinocchio	Toy	Gross	3	2	1	Could a bag of dust be good For thumping foes? I think it wood.
33/70	Moon	Prince Phillip's Enchanted Sword	Prince Phillip	Samson	Sleeping Beauty	Warrior	Charming	2	2	1	You'll be like this dashing lord Who's not afraid to use his sword.
34/70	Moon	Snow White's Housecleaning	Snow White	Bird, Squirrel	Snow White and the Seven Dwarfs	Princess	Charming	4	1	0	Stay alert, or while you're sleeping, I'll give you a thorough sweeping.
35/70	Moon	The Headless Horseman's Exploding Jack-O-Lantern	The Headless Horseman	The Headless Horseman's Horse	The Adventures of Ichabod and Mr. Toad	Monster	Quick	4	0	2	Tossing bombs without remorse, At least he's not a headless horse.
36/70	Moon	The Mad Hatter's Tea Time	The Mad Hatter		Alice in Wonderland	Mystic	Charming	3	1	2	Hurry up, don't hesitate. It's time for tea so don't be late.
37/70	Moon	The Queen of Hearts's Card Army	The Queen of Hearts	Playing Cards	Alice in Wonderland	Warrior	Strong	3	1	1	Go on, we'll give the cards a shuffle. That will cause a fine kerfuffle.
38/70	Moon	The Sugar Plum Fairies' Dewdrop Spiderweb	Sugar Plum Fairies		Fantasia	Fairy	Charming	1	0	5	The fairy spell can be quite tricky Trapping you in webs so sticky.
39/70	Moon	WALL-E's Trash Crunch	WALL-E		WALL-E	Machine	Gross	1	2	3	Cars, guitars, and vacuum tubes, I'll crush you into tiny cubes.
40/70	Moon	Yen Sid's Sorcerers Hat	Yen Sid		Fantasia	Mystic	Wishful	3	0	3	A wizard you shall be anointed With a hat that's nice and pointed.
41/70	Planet	Aurora's Rose Petals	Princess Aurora	Owl	Sleeping Beauty	Princess	Wishful	1	1	3	Though beautiful, these magic petals Strike a foe lik stinging nettles
42/70	Planet	Baloo's Coconut Cascade	Baloo		The Jungle Book	Animal	Flying	2	2	1	Watch your step if you're a klutz, Or you'll be crowned with coconuts.
43/70	Planet	Caballero Donald's Piñata	Caballero Donald Duck		The Three Caballeros	Warrior	Flying	2	0	3	Inside you'll find a tasty snack So grab a bat and take a whack.
44/70	Planet	Dash's Whirlwind	Dash Parr		The Incredibles	Hero	Quick	2	2	1	Get a move on, make it fast Until your speed is unsurpassed.
45/70	Planet	Flower's Flowers	Flower		Bambi	Animal	Charming	2	0	3	Be mindful when a skunk proposes Taking time to smell the roses.
46/70	Planet	Gopher's Demolition Dynamite	Gopher		Winnie the Pooh	Toy	Energy	3	1	2	Digs a tunnel, den, or tomb In one gargantuan kaboom.
47/70	Planet	Grumpy's Pummeling Pickaxe	Grumpy		Snow White and the Seven Dwarfs	Hero	Strong	2	0	3	Shovels, hammers, spikes, and picks: Just don't tick off the other six.
48/70	Planet	Lumière's Candle Blast	Lumière	Cogsworth	Beauty and the Beast	Warrior	Energy	1	1	3	A fiery waxing soon descends. My candle burns you at both ends.
49/70	Planet	Mowgli's Swinging Vine	Mowgli		The Jungle Book	Warrior	Flying	3	2	0	You may wear the jungle crown, But know it's still a long way down.
50/70	Planet	Mr. Toad's Wild Ride	Mr. Toad		The Adventures of Ichabod and Mr. Toad	Hero	Energy	3	1	1	Bounding round at blazing speed, Now that's a wild ride indeed.
51/70	Planet	Pocahontas's Colors of the Wind	Pocahontas		Pocahontas	Princess	Wishful	3	1	1	Awash in greens and reds and blues, The winds bedecked in many hues.
52/70	Planet	Pongo's Soot Bucket	Pongo		One Hundred and One Dalmatians	Animal	Gross	1	1	3	The thick black dust that I will throw May cover you from head to toe.
53/70	Planet	Prince Naveen's Army of Frogs	Prince Naveen	Tiana (in frog form), other frogs	The Princess and the Frog	Hero	Gross	1	2	2	Don't disturb their lily pad. Too late! You've made them hopping mad.
54/70	Planet	Pumbaa's Odorous Gas	Pumbaa		The Lion King	Animal	Gross	2	1	2	Plug you mouth and hold your nose And hope that soon a stiff wind blows.
55/70	Planet	Quasimodo's Bell	Quasimodo	Hugo	The Hunchback of Notre Dame	Monster	Strong	3	1	2	If a bell ringer you'd be, You soon will find it tolls for thee.
56/70	Planet	Rafiki's Wisdom Stick	Rafiki	Zazu	The Lion King	Mystic	Charming	2	2	2	This might hurt, but I just gotta Hit you with "Hakuna matata."
57/70	Planet	The Blue Fairy's Wand Wish	The Blue Fairy	Figaro	Pinocchio	Fairy	Wishful	2	2	2	If in fairies you confide, Just let your conscience be your guide.
58/70	Planet	The Woozles' Woozle Nightmare	Woozles	Heffalumps	Winnie the Pooh	Animal	Wishful	1	2	2	With our magic we'll bamboozle Those who doubt the mighty woozle.
59/70	Planet	Thumper's Mighty Thump	Thumper		Bambi	Animal	Flying	4	0	1	With a force to make you shiver, Thumping I will soon deliver.
60/70	Planet	Tiana's Hot Sauce	Princess Tiana		The Princess and the Frog	Princess	Gross	3	0	2	This tasty topping has some minuses, Most encountered by your sinuses.
61/70	Lightning	Ariel's Bubble Attack	Ariel		The Little Mermaid	Princess	Quick	3	2	0	Your foe will be beset with troubles In the form of see-through bubbles.
62/70	Lightning	Dumbo's Pink Elephant Parade	Dumbo	Pink Elephants	Dumbo	Animal	Wishful	1	3	1	These in no uncertain terms Are technicolor pachyderms.
63/70	Lightning	Finn McMissile's Missile Salvo	Finn McMissile	Holley Shiftwell	Cars	Machine	Flying	5	0	1	Step right up, and don't be skittish. Our projectiles are quite British.
64/70	Lightning	Hercules's Tower Topple	Hercules		Hercules	Warrior	Strong	4	0	1	This display of awesome power Sure will topple any tower.
65/70	Lightning	Jasmine's Magic Carpet Tassels of Fury	Princess Jasmine	Magic Carpet	Aladdin	Princess	Flying	1	2	2	Hiding in the highest castles Won't escape my flying tassels.
66/70	Lightning	Mama Odie's Magic Charm	Mama Odie	Juju	The Princess and the Frog	Mystic	Charming	1	1	4	These magic charms are quite uncanny Conjured by a kindly granny.
67/70	Lightning	Merryweather's Stone Spell	Merryweather		Sleeping Beauty	Fairy	Energy	4	2	0	Don't just stand there like an ox. You must beware of falling rocks.
68/70	Lightning	Mr. Incredible's Power Heave	Mr. Incredible		The Incredibles	Hero	Strong	5	0	0	It can be quite entertaining When conducting basic "training."
69/70	Lightning	Mushu's Fiery Breath	Mushu		Mulan	Monster	Energy	4	1	1	Here's a simple demonstration Of draconic conflagration.
70/70	Lightning	Winnie the Pooh's Honey Bees	Winnie the Pooh	Bees	Winnie the Pooh	Toy	Flying	1	0	5	What's that sound? Vamoose because I hear those bees are all abuzz.
01/P	2012 Halloween Party Exclusive	Chip 'n' Dale's Bag of Tricks	Chip 'n' Dale		Mickey Mouse	Animal	Gross	2	3	0	Don't be an unwitting stooge To this chipmunk subterfuge.
02/P	2012 Christmas Party Exclusive	Wayne and Lanny's Ornament Barrage	Wayne and Lanny		Prep & Landing	Toy	Quick	4	1	1	Should you meet their elvish gaze, They'll put you in a holi-daze.
03/P	2013 Halloween Party Exclusive	The Haunted Mansion's Happy Haunting Grounds	The Hitchhiking Ghosts		The Haunted Mansion	Monster	Flying	3	2	1	Come on in! Your gracious hosts Would like for you to stay as ghosts.
04/P	2013 Christmas Party Exclusive	Huey, Dewey, & Louie's Snowfort Barricade	Huey, Dewey, and Louie		Donald Duck	Hero	Strong	3	0	2	Brace yourselves! They're now attacking! Fear the might of boys a-quacking.
05/P	2014 Halloween Party Exclusive	The Pirate Helmsman's Bombardment	Skeleton Helmsman		Pirates of the Caribbean (attraction)	Monster	Quick	2	3	1	Fear the waves if ye be seein' Pirates of the Caribbean.
06/P	2014 Christmas Party Exclusive	Elsa's Icy Shield	Elsa	Marshmallow	Frozen	Princess	Energy	2	1	2	Winter's here. Your fate's been chosen When the Snow Queen's heart is frozen.
07/P	2015 Halloween Party Exclusive	Minnie Mouse's Costume Chaos	Minnie Mouse	Daisy Duck, Clarabelle Cow	Mickey Mouse	Mystic	Flying	3	2	1	Clarabelle and Daisy too Will help concoct this bubbly brew.
08/P	2015 Christmas Party Exclusive	Olaf's Snowgies	Olaf	Snowgies	Frozen	Hero	Charming	1	1	3	A snowgie's like a winter breeze That's summoned by a snow queen's sneeze.
09/P	2016 Halloween Party Exclusive	Clawhauser's Tricky Treat	Clawhauser	Rabbit, Tiger	Zootopia	Animal	Charming	3	2	1	House to house, kids are accosting Folks with doughnuts glazed in frosting.
10/P	2016 Christmas Party Exclusive	Goofy's Festive Fiasco	Goofy		Mickey Mouse	Hero	Energy	6	0	0	Botching Christmas decorations Leads to wacky altercations.
11/P	2017 Halloween Party Exclusive	The Country Bears' Moonlight Jamboree	Henry, Ted, Big Al, Gomer, Sammy		The Country Bear Jamboree	Hero	Charming	1	2	3	When those haunting jitters come in, Music sends those fears a-runnin'.
12/P	2017 Christmas Party Exclusive	Rover's Christmas Carousel of Progress	Rover	John, Jim	The Carousel of Progress	Animal	Wishful	3	1	2	Christmastime is never dogless at the Carousel of Progress.
13/P	2018 Halloween Party Exclusive	The Orange Bird's Juice-O-Lanterns	Orange Bird		Sunshine Tree Terrace	Flying Animal	Charming	2	3	1	High atop the Sunshine Tree, He makes each pumpkin wannabe.
14/P	2018 Christmas Party Exclusive	The Tiki Room's Four Cawing Birds	José, Michael, Fritz, Pierre		The Enchanted Tiki Room	Flying Animal	Charming	2	2	2	In your calendar so tiki Are surprises bold and beaky.
15/P	2019 Halloween Party Exclusive	The Phantasmal Fireworks' Flash	Mickey Mouse, Minnie Mouse, Donald Duck, Daisy Duck, Goofy		Mickey Mouse	Machine	Energy	3	2	1	A brilliant night display commences, Sure to please your dazzled senses.
16/P	2019 Christmas Party Exclusive	Pluto's Toppling Popcorn	Pluto	Chip 'n' Dale	Mickey Mouse	Animal	Charming	2	1	3	If by chipmunks you're beset, Trust the sniffer of your pet.
