= List of Disney's Sleeping Beauty characters =

A promotional image of the characters from Sleeping Beauty. From left to right: the forest animals, the Goons, Maleficent, Diablo, Prince Phillip, Princess Aurora, Flora, Queen Leah, Fauna, Merryweather, King Stefan, King Hubert, Samson, and the lackey.

The following are fictional characters in Disney's 1959 film Sleeping Beauty and related media.

== Princess Aurora ==
Princess Aurora is the titular protagonist of the film and the third official Disney Princess. Maleficent, the evil fairy, casts a spell on Aurora as a baby that on her sixteenth birthday she will prick her finger on the spindle of a spinning wheel and die. Aurora and three fairies, Merryweather, Flora and Fauna, move to a cottage in the forest and change her name to Briar Rose to hide her from Maleficent.

On her sixteenth birthday, they send her out to gather berries while planning to have a surprise party to tell her that she is a princess. However, after she returns and tells them that she met a man, they tell her that she cannot see him again because they do not know who he is. Despite their efforts to protect her, Maleficent lures Aurora to a tower room with a spark of light that transforms into a spinning wheel. After she pricks her finger on the spindle, the fairies put the kingdom to sleep before placing her in the tower until she can be awakened. Only true love's kiss will break the spell.

After Phillip's kiss of true love breaks the curse, she learns that he is the same person as the man she met in the woods, and they dance after reuniting with their parents.

== Maleficent ==
Maleficent is the main antagonist of the film and the self-proclaimed "Mistress of All Evil". She is based on the evil fairy godmother character in the original fairy tale, as well as in Brothers Grimm's retelling of the story, Little Briar Rose.

== Flora, Fauna and Merryweather ==
Flora, Fauna and Merryweather are good fairy godmothers, based on the good fairies in the original fairy tale and various retellings. They appear at baby Aurora's christening to present their gifts to the newborn Princess Aurora and aid her, Phillip, and the kingdom with their magic.

== Prince Phillip ==
Prince Phillip
- Prince Phillip, as he appears in Kingdom Hearts Birth by Sleep.
- First appearance: Sleeping Beauty (1959)
- Voiced by: Bill Shirley (original film); Roger Craig Smith (Disney Princess Enchanted Tales); Josh Robert Thompson (Kingdom Hearts Birth by Sleep)
- Portrayed by: Brenton Thwaites (Maleficent); Harris Dickinson (Maleficent: Mistress of Evil)
- Family: King Hubert (father)
- Spouse: Aurora
- Children: Princess Audrey (Descendants)
- Relatives: King Stefan (father-in-law), Queen Leah (mother-in-law)

Prince Phillip is Aurora's true love, who is based on the prince from the original fairy tale. He is the first prince in a Disney theatrical animated film to have an active role and have both a proper name and characterization.

In the film, he is betrothed to marry the princess, the daughter of his father's best friend, and attends Aurora's christening to give her a gift. Phillip reunites with Aurora after hearing her singing while riding in the forest and sings with her, after which they fall in love, but Aurora leaves after realizing that she is disobeying the fairies' orders. Upon arriving at Aurora's home, Maleficent captures him, but the fairies rescue him and aid him with their magic, giving him the Sword of Truth and Shield of Virtue. At the castle, he battles Maleficent, who transforms into a dragon, and slays her with the Sword of Truth. He goes to the castle and kisses Aurora, awakening her and the kingdom. They share a dance after reuniting with their parents.

In Disney Princess Enchanted Tales: Follow Your Dreams, he is one of the characters from Sleeping Beauty to appear. In the "Keys to the Kingdom" segment, he is set to leave the kingdom along with his father and Aurora's parents for a royal conference, leaving Aurora to reign over it in their absence. By the end of the segment, they return in time for the celebration for Aurora's duty.

Phillip appears in Disney/Square's Kingdom Hearts Birth by Sleep in his homeworld, Enchanted Dominion, reprising his role from the film while fighting alongside Aqua. However, unlike the film, Maleficent is not killed, but weakened and returned to her first form.

He also appears in House of Mouse, at theme parks and live events, and in the "Disney Heroes" range of action figures along with Maleficent.

In Maleficent, he is portrayed by Brenton Thwaites. Phillip meets Aurora after his father, King John of Ulstead, sends him to King Stefan's castle on a business matter. Rather than falling in love (yet), they develop a sibling-like fondness for each other.

In Maleficent: Mistress of Evil, he is instead portrayed by Harris Dickinson, as Thwaites was unable to reprise the role due to scheduling conflicts.

== King Stefan ==
King Stefan
- First appearance: Sleeping Beauty (1959)
- Voiced by: Taylor Holmes (original film); Hans Conried (deleted song, "It Happens I Have a Picture"); Corey Burton (Disney Princess Enchanted Tales)
- Portrayed by: Sharlto Copley (Maleficent); Michael Higgins (Maleficent; young); Jackson Bews (Maleficent; teen)
- Spouse: Queen Leah
- Children: Princess Aurora

King Stefan is Aurora's father and one of the rulers of his kingdom. He is caring and protective of his kingdom and family, but he can sometimes be incompetent and grumpy.

King Stefan and Queen Leah gave birth to their daughter named Aurora. During Aurora's christening, Stefan's lifelong friend, King Hubert, attends the celebration, during which Aurora is betrothed to Hubert's son, Prince Phillip, so their marriage will unite their kingdoms. After Maleficent curses Aurora, he tries to have Maleficent and decrees that all spinning wheels in the kingdom burned as a failed attempt to stop the curse before giving up Aurora to the fairies.

Sixteen years later, Stefan felt ashamed of his actions and for worrying about Aurora. During the feast, he and Hubert argue about the plans of their kingdoms and children, as Stefan prefers that the couple spend time together before being wed, while Hubert has already had a new castle made ready for them. When Aurora gets cursed by Maleficent, Stefan is put to sleep along with the rest of the kingdom. When the curse is broken, he and Leah reunite with Aurora. Along with Hubert, he and Leah watch their daughter dance with Phillip.

In Disney Princess Enchanted Tales: Follow Your Dreams, Stefan leaves along with Leah, Hubert, and Phillip for a royal conference, leaving Aurora to rule the kingdom in their absence with help from their majordomo, Lord Duke. After returning home, he attends the celebration that Aurora organized, along with his wife, Hubert, Phillip, the fairies, and Duke.

In Maleficent, he was portrayed by Sharlto Copley and is instead portrayed as a vengeful tyrant in contrast to the original film that depicts him as the flawed but protective patriarch and ruler. As an orphaned farm boy, he was friends with Maleficent before his ambition to become king led him to betray her and sever her wings to win the dying King Henry's favor.

== Queen Leah ==
Queen Leah
- First appearance: Sleeping Beauty (1959)
- Voiced by: Verna Felton (original film, possibly); Barbara Dirikson (Disney Princess Enchanted Tales)
- Portrayed by: Hannah New (Maleficent); Judith Maxie (Descendants & Descendants 3)
- Spouse: King Stefan
- Children: Princess Aurora

Queen Leah is Aurora's mother and King Stefan's wife.

After Aurora is cursed, she sees her off as she and the fairies leave. Sixteen years later, she is put to sleep along with the rest of the kingdom after Aurora pricked her finger on the spinning wheel. However, after the curse is broken, she and Stefan reunite with Aurora before watching her dance with Phillip.

In Disney Princess Enchanted Tales, she, along with Stefan, Hubert, and Phillip, leave for a royal conference, leaving Aurora to rule the kingdom in their absence.

In Maleficent, Queen Leila is portrayed by Hannah New and introduced as the daughter of Stefan's predecessor, King Henry. Leila remains loyal to her father by marrying Stefan and bearing his eventual heir, Aurora. Like her animated counterpart, she witnesses Maleficent place a curse on the princess. Sixteen years later, shortly before Aurora's sixteenth birthday, Leia dies off-screen from an illness.

In Descendants, she meets Mal, whom she blames for Maleficent's actions, and attends the coronation with her granddaughter Audrey.

== King Hubert ==
King Hubert
- First appearance: Sleeping Beauty (1959)
- Voiced by: Bill Thompson (original film); Jeff Bennett (Disney Princess Enchanted Tales)
- Portrayed by: Robert Lindsay (Maleficent: Mistress of Evil; as King John of Ulstead)

King Hubert is Phillip's father, King Stefan's friend, and the ruler of a neighboring kingdom. Though sometimes prone to being temperamental and quarrelsome regarding his argument with Stefan, Hubert does care for Phillip, Stefan, and others in the kingdoms.

In the film, he and Phillip attend Aurora's christening, where he and King Stefan betrothed their children to marry each other and unite their kingdoms. Sixteen years later, he and Stefan have a disagreement during the celebration for Aurora's return until Phillip arrives and informs them that he has decided to marry a woman he met in the forest, which Hubert forbids due to her being a peasant girl. After Aurora gets cursed by Maleficent, Hubert and the whole realm are all put under a sleeping spell; however, he tells Stefan that Phillip is in love with a peasant girl, causing Flora to realize that it was Phillip whom Aurora met in the forest and the only one who can help the kingdom. After the curse is broken, he is about to tell Stefan that Phillip loves a peasant girl until he comes down the stairs with Aurora, during which he, Stefan and Leah watch them dance.

In Disney Princess Enchanted Tales: Follow Your Dreams, he attends a royal conference along with Phillip, Stefan, and Leah, where he is to give a speech. However, he realizes he has forgotten his speech at Stefan's castle until the fairies arrive and deliver him his speech. After returning home, he attends a meal organized by Aurora.

In Maleficent, where he is known as King John of Ulstead, he sends Phillip to King Stefan's castle.

In Maleficent: Mistress of Evil, where he is portrayed by Robert Lindsay, he seeks to establish peace between Ulstead and the Moors. Following his son's engagement, John and Ingrith hold a banquet to celebrate, but tensions rise when Maleficent and Ingrith discuss the fatalities on their respective sides, each claiming that the other is responsible. When Maleficent loses her temper, Ingrith enacts her secret plan to overthrow the king by cursing him with a spindle and blaming Maleficent. Phillip urges his mother to kiss John, but it does not work, as Ingrith secretly despises her husband for desiring peace and is not truly in love with him. The king's curse results in a war between Ulstead and the Moors, as well as the Dark Fey.

After Phillip ends the war and the curse is broken, he attends Aurora and Phillip's wedding and tells him that he is proud of him for achieving peace between Ulstead and the Moors.

== Diablo ==
Diablo is Maleficent's pet raven, who she sends to find Aurora, and discovers the cottage where she is living with the fairies due to Flora and Meryweather's magic. After informing her of this, he joins Maleficent as she and the goons capture Phillip in the cottage, and notices the fairies' presence in the Forbidden Mountain. Diablo later discovers that Phillip has escaped with the fairies' aid and commands the goons to stop them from leaving the mountain. Though Merryweather turns him to stone, he attracts Maleficent's attention and she learns that Phillip has escaped.

He also appears in the Kingdom Hearts series. In Kingdom Hearts II, he carries Maleficent's cloak into Yen Sid's tower to ensure her revival, and in Kingdom Hearts: Dream Drop Distance he delivers a message to Mickey Mouse.

In Maleficent and its sequel Maleficent: Mistress of Evil, where he is portrayed by Sam Riley, he is known as Diaval. After Maleficent rescues the raven by empowering him to shape-shift at will, a grateful Diaval pledges himself to Maleficent's service...becoming her closest confidante as well as her aide-de-camp. He and Maleficent later retire, leaving now-Queen Aurora to rule their domains.

== Samson ==
Samson (voiced by Frank Welker in Disney Princess Enchanted Tales: Follow Your Dreams) is Phillip's horse who guides him to the castle to save his father, Aurora, her parents and the rest of the realm.

== Forest animals ==
There are some forest animals who are friends of Aurora. These include an owl, squirrels, rabbits, and several birds. They take Phillip's cape, hat, and boots to disguise themselves as the prince Aurora dreamed of.

Two birds and a squirrel also appear in the segment "Keys to the Kingdom" from Disney Princess Enchanted Tales: Follow Your Dreams (a rabbit also appears on the DVD cover, although do not make an actual appearance in the film). The forest animals also have cameo appearances in the television series House of Mouse. The owl has a brief cameo appearance in the television special Lego Disney Princess: Villains Unite.

== Maleficent's goons ==
Maleficent's goons are goblin-type creatures who are loyal, but unintelligent, as due to unclear orders from Maleficent, they search for an infant Aurora rather than a girl of proper age. They later capture Phillip and unsuccessfully attempt to prevent him from escaping.

They also appear in Who Framed Roger Rabbit (1988) in Maroon Cartoon Studios, House of Mouse as recurring guests, and Kingdom Hearts: Birth By Sleep as minor enemies.

== Minstrel ==
Minstrel
- First appearance: Sleeping Beauty (1959)

In-universe information
- Alias: Lackey
- Occupation: Maitre d'

Minstrel (also known as the Lackey) is King Stefan's jolly but absent-minded maitre d' hotel of the household staff. He plays the lute while Stefan and Hubert toast singing "Skumps", with him also taking the opportunity to drink, only to end up getting drunk in the act.

== Lord Duke ==
Lord Duke
- First appearance: Keys to the Kingdom (2007)
- Voiced by: Jeff Bennett (Keys to the Kingdom)
- Aliases: Duke; The Duke (in the credits)
- Occupation: Majordomo

Lord Duke (also known simply as Duke for short) is King Stefan's tightly wound, yet extremely obedient, majordomo of the household staff. In his official appearance in the "Keys to the Kingdom" segment from Disney Princess Enchanted Tales: Follow Your Dreams, Duke aids Aurora, who reigns over the kingdom in her family's absence. Though accident-prone, he is loyal and takes his duties as majordomo very seriously no matter how difficult these rules are, in order to impress both of his bosses. However, Duke's own loyalty is still driven out of fear of angering or upsetting his master and mistress.
