= Amy Powers =

American lyricist, songwriter and producer

- Born: 1960 (age 65–66); United States
- Occupations: Producer and songwriter
- Spouse: J. Todd Harris
- Children: Jasper (born 1998) and Cole (born 2000)

Amy Powers (born 1960) is a lyricist, songwriter and producer who writes songs for film, television, and theater.

== Career ==
=== Early life ===
Powers graduated from Vassar College, and then attended Columbia University (M.B.A) and Harvard University (law degree).

=== Musical theater ===
Powers co-wrote the lyrics for the musical Cinderella: A Musical with composer Dan Levy for Riverside Shakespeare Company at Playhouse 91 in New York, which ran in December 1991 to March 1992. She wrote the lyrics and book for the stage musical Lizzie Borden with composer Christopher McGovern. The musical ran at Goodspeed Musicals Norma Terris Theatre (Chester, CT.) in November 2001. The Game, a stage musical for which Powers is the co-librettist/lyricist, was produced at Barrington Stage Company in August 2003.

She is the co/lyricist with Michael Korie for Doctor Zhivago, a musical based on the Russian novel Doctor Zhivago, by Boris Pasternak. The show was revised after its preview run at the La Jolla Playhouse, and premiered at the Lyric Theatre, Sydney in February 2011. The musical premiered on Broadway in April 2015.

Powers, alongside Don Black, was the original co-lyricist for the Andrew Lloyd Webber composed musical adaptation of Sunset Boulevard. Released from the show following a first act developmental presentation at the Sydmonton Festival in 1991, Powers was ultimately given a lyrical development credit for four songs from the show: "With One Look," "The Greatest Star Of All," "Sunset Boulevard" and "As If We Never Said Goodbye".

=== Film and television ===
Powers' first song for film was the title track for the Oscar-Winning When We Were Kings (1996). She has also written songs for the films Sweet Home Alabama, Ella Enchanted and Aquamarine as well as television shows including Guiding Light, All My Children, Laguna Beach, Castle and America's Next Top Model. Powers' songs have been featured in Mattel's Barbie Movies including Barbie & the Diamond Castle, Barbie as the Princess and the Pauper, and Disney Princess Enchanted Tales: Follow Your Dreams.

=== Nominations ===
Powers was nominated for an Outstanding Original Song Daytime Emmy in the Children's/Animated category for "Shine" in Barbie and the 12 Dancing Princesses in 2007, and an Annie Award for Best Music in an Animated Feature Production for her work in Disney Princess Enchanted Tales: Follow Your Dreams in 2007.
