= List of Fantasia (franchise) characters =

The following are fictional characters from Disney's 1940 film Fantasia, its 1999 sequel Fantasia 2000, and the 2014 video game Fantasia: Music Evolved. Characters are sorted by the film and segment in which they appear.

== Notable and recurring characters ==
=== Mickey Mouse ===
Mickey Mouse appears as the main character of the segment The Sorcerer's Apprentice in both Fantasia and Fantasia 2000.

=== Yen Sid ===
Yen Sid
- First appearance: Fantasia (1940); The Sorcerer's Apprentice segment
- Created by: Fred Moore
- Voiced by: Michael Rye (The Wonderful World of Disney, "Disney on Parade"); Corey Burton (English); Takashi Inagaki (Japanese)
- Portrayed by: Dan Bakkedahl (Hidden Heroes: A Descendants Story)

Yen Sid, whose name is derived from "Disney" spelled backwards, is a sorcerer who appears in The Sorcerer's Apprentice. In the segment, his apprentice, Mickey Mouse, watches him cast spells before he decides to take a break, leaving his hat behind. Mickey takes the hat and uses its magic to bring a broom to life to help him retrieve water from the well. However, he is unable to control the magic, and the basement floods after he falls asleep. Eventually, Sid arrives and undoes the spell. Afterwards, he takes back his hat and broom and sends Mickey to finish his chores.

==== Yen Sid in other media ====
- Yen Sid, known as Merlin, appears in The Wonderful World of Disney episode "Disney on Parade", voiced by Michael Rye.
- Yen Sid appears in the Kingdom Hearts series, voiced by Corey Burton in English, Takashi Inagaki in the Japanese versions of most games, and Kazuaki Ito in the Japanese version of Melody of Memory. This version is a retired Keyblade Master and former colleague of Eraqus and Xehanort.
- Yen Sid appears in Epic Mickey, voiced again by Corey Burton.
- Yen Sid appears in Fantasia: Music Evolved, where he employs the player as his new apprentice.
- Yen Sid appears in Disney Magical World as the creator of Castleton who tasks the player with defeating an army of ghosts.
- In the Descendants franchise, Yen Sid appears in the prequel novel to the first film, The Isle of the Lost, where he works at the Dragon Hall school on the Isle and helps its students adapt to life without magical recourse. He returns in the novel Return to the Isle of the Lost, as the founder of the Anti-Heroes Club, where the descendants of various villains want to avoid becoming like their parents. Yen Sid will appear in the film Hidden Heroes: A Descendants Story, played by Dan Bakkedahl.
- Yen Sid appears in the Disneyland attraction "Mickey and the Magical Map", voiced again by Corey Burton.

=== Donald Duck ===
Donald Duck appears as a main character in the segment Noah's Ark (Pomp and Circumstance – Marches 1, 2, 3 and 4) from Fantasia 2000.

=== Daisy Duck ===
Daisy Duck appears as a main character in the segment Noah's Ark (Pomp and Circumstance – Marches 1, 2, 3 and 4) from Fantasia 2000.

=== Chernabog ===
Chernabog
- First appearance: Fantasia (1940); Night on Bald Mountain segment
- Created by: Walt Disney, Bill Tytla
- Voiced by: Corey Burton

In-universe information
- Species: Demon

Chernabog is a devil who appears in Night on Bald Mountain, who can take people's hearts and holds power over various restless souls. His name is derived from Chernobog, a deity from Slavic mythology. While officially a pagan god, Chernabog may have been intended as a representation of Satan, with Walt Disney and Deems Taylor referring to him as such.

In the segment, on Walpurgis Night, Chernabog is disguised as the spire atop Bald Mountain until he reveals himself and uses his powers to raise various evil spirits and restless souls. However, they retreat after morning dawns, signified by the tolling of the Angelus Bell.

==== Chernabog in other media ====
- Chernabog in the Fantasmic! nighttime show at Disneyland in Anaheim, California and the Disney's Hollywood Studios in Orlando, Florida.
- Chernabog appeared in the original version of World of Color at Disney California Adventure, which was replaced with an extended Pirates of the Caribbean sequence in 2011.
- Chernabog appears in Sorcerers of the Magic Kingdom.
- Chernabog appears as a boss in the Kingdom Hearts series. He first appears in Kingdom Hearts (2002) and later appears in Kingdom Hearts 3D: Dream Drop Distance (2012).
- Chernabog appears in Disney at Dawn, the second book of the Kingdom Keepers series. He was sealed in the form of the Yeti in the Disney's Animal Kingdom attraction Expedition Everest before being freed by Maleficent.
- Chernabog appears in House of Mouse, voiced by Corey Burton.
- Chernabog appears in the Once Upon a Time episode "Darkness on the Edge of Town".
- Chernabog appears in the Epic Mickey series.
- Chernabog makes non-speaking appearances in the Mickey Mouse episodes "Touchdown and Out" and "The Scariest Story Ever".
- Chernabog makes a cameo appearance in Once Upon a Studio.
- Chernabog is one of the main antagonists in Lego Disney Princess: Villains Unite.
- Chernabog is a playable character to unlock for a limited time in the video game Disney Magic Kingdoms.

== Introduced in Fantasia (1940 film) ==
This section excludes Toccata and Fugue in D Minor, as no characters appear in them.

=== Nutcracker Suite ===
- The Fairies have control over nature and control each season. The Dewdrop Fairies create dewdrops in flowers and webs for spring while dancing the Dance of the Sugar Plum Fairy. The other fairies are the Summer Fairies, who change spring to summer; the Autumn Fairies, who change summer to autumn and make the leaves fall and change color; the Frost Fairies, who turn autumn to winter and ice the lakes and rivers; and the Snowflake Fairies, who create snow. The fairies of summer, autumn and winter dance the Waltz of the Flowers.
- Hop Low and the Dancing Mushrooms are a group of mushrooms who dance to the Chinese Dance.
- The Dancing Flowers come to life through the fairies' magic, dancing to the Dance of the Reed Flutes on a river and making bubbles.
- The Goldfish swim to the Arabian Dance and make bubbles.
- The Dancing Thistles and the Dancing Orchids, who come in various colors, dance to the Russian Dance.

=== The Sorcerer's Apprentice ===
The Broomsticks are summoned by Mickey to help him bring water from the well. They also appear in the film Who Framed Roger Rabbit, the television series House of Mouse, the video games from the Kingdom Hearts series, Epic Mickey and Epic Mickey 2: The Power of Two, and Disney Magic Kingdoms, the attraction Mickey's PhilharMagic, and the television special Lego Disney Princess: Villains Unite.

=== The Rite of Spring ===
- The Tyrannosaurus rex kills a Stegosaurus, while another Tyrannosaurus collapses in thirst while walking with the other dinosaurs in the drought. It also appears in Bonkers, where it attempts to eat Sergeant Grating, but stops to take a coffee break. The T. rex is depicted with an upright posture, rather than low and parallel to the ground, which was considered scientifically accurate at the time. It is also depicted with three claws on each arm rather than two, as Disney felt that "it looked better that way".
- The Stegosaurus is killed by the Tyrannosaurus rex and is among the dinosaurs that flee the extinction.

=== Intermission/Meet the Soundtrack ===
Soundtrack represents the film's soundtrack and resembles a string instrument. It can make any sound, changing its appearance to various instruments to match the sound it makes.

=== The Pastoral Symphony ===
- Bacchus is the god of wine, who has a pet unicorn donkey named Jacchus. The mythological creatures gather for a bacchanal to honor him before Zeus stops him by throwing lightning bolts at him.
- The Centaurs are half-man, half-horse creatures and lovers of the Centaurettes.
- Brudus is a black-haired blue centaur with purple horse legs.
- The Centaurettes are female centaurs and the centaurs' lovers.
- Melinda is a blonde-haired blue centaurette who falls in love with Brudus.
- Sunflower and Otika are black centaurettes with donkey bodies. Since the film's 1969 re-release, they have been edited out due to their appearance resembling blackface.
- The zebra Centaurettes are half-zebra, half-Nubian centaurettes and followers of Bacchus.
- The Cupids are winged baby-like creatures and followers of Aphrodite.
- The Fauns are half-human, half-goat creatures who play the flute.
- Iris, Apollo, Morpheus and Diana are Olympian gods of the rainbow, sun and music, night and sleep, and the moon and hunting, respectively.
- Pegasus and their family are winged horses. Peter Pegasus appears in Who Framed Roger Rabbit.
- Zeus is the king of the gods and the god of the sky. He attacks the bacchanal with lightning bolts before going back to sleep.
- Vulcan is the blacksmith of the gods, who creates Zeus' thunderbolts.
- The unicorns are horse-like creatures and friends of the fauns. A unicorn appears in Who Framed Roger Rabbit along with the other Toontown inhabitants.
- Boreas is a two-headed cloud that blows Bacchus and Jacchus. Boreas also appears in So Dear to My Heart.

=== Dance of the Hours ===
- Madame Upanova is an anthropomorphic ostrich and leader of the Ostrich dancing group. She also appears in Who Framed Roger Rabbit and House of Mouse, where she is voiced by Tress MacNeille.
- The ostrich class dances to Dance of the Hours and fight over purple grapes before being scared after the Hippopotamus awakens. In the climax, the alligators find them and force them to dance as they ride on their backs.
- Hyacinth Hippo eats the grapes the Ostriches had been fighting over and dances with them before falling asleep. After being woken by Ben Ali Gator, she falls in love with him. She also appears in Who Framed Roger Rabbit, Bonkers, and at Disney World and Disneyland.
- The hippopotamus servants are Hyacinth Hippo's maids, who Taylor describes as being "dressed to represent the brilliant light of noon day". They dance during the afternoon and help Hyacinth into her ballerina dress. In the final scene, they are found by the Alligators and forced to dance for them. They also appear in Mickey's Twice Upon a Christmas, where they help Daisy Duck ice skate.
- Elephanchine is an anthropomorphic Asian elephant.
- The Elephant partners wear pink Mary Jane ballet slippers and are described by Taylor as wearing "costumes that suggest the delicate tones of early evening". They dance during the evening and blow bubbles before being blown away by the wind and found by the Alligators.
- Ben Ali Gator is the prince of the alligators, who Hyacinth Hippo falls in love with. They playfully begin a chase, which escalates to the final dance. He also appears in Bonkers.
- The alligator rivals, in the climax of Dance of the Hours, find the other animals and force them to dance. Taylor describes them as being dressed "all in black, the sombre hours of the night". After attempting to prevent Hyacinth from escaping, they partner up with the Hippopotami, Ostriches, and Elephants. They also appear in Disney's Mickey's Twice Upon a Christmas, where they help Minnie Mouse be the champion in ice skating and ice skate with the Hippopotami.

=== Night on Bald Mountain/Ave Maria ===
- Chernabog's minions are various evil creatures who gather on Walpurgis Night at Bald Mountain after being summoned by Chernabog.
- The monks move in procession while crossing the meadow, going over a bridge and through the woods until the crack of dawn arrives as the choir sings the last chords of the Ave Maria.

== Introduced in Fantasia 2000 ==
This section excludes The Sorcerer's Apprentice, as it was carried over from the original film.

=== Symphony No. 5 ===
The Butterflies and the Bats come in various colors and live in a world that is half light and half darkness until it is finally conquered by light.

=== Pines of Rome ===
- The humpback whale calf is an excellent jumper who is separated from his parents after being trapped in an iceberg while fleeing from an angry flock of seagulls, later finding his way out with his mother's help.
- The Humpback Whales are normal whales who gain the ability to fly following a supernova.

=== Rhapsody in Blue ===
- Duke the Builder is a man who wishes to be a jazz drummer.
- Rachel the Little Girl is a young girl who wishes to spend more time with her parents rather than going to her many lessons.
- Flying John the Red-Haired Man with Glasses is a man who wishes to be free from Killjoy Margaret, his overbearing and domineering wife.
- Jobless Joe the Poor Man is a man who wishes to have a job and, despite being poor, is honest and dependable.
- The Nanny takes Rachel to her different lessons and goes after Rachel when she runs after her ball.
- George Gershwin makes a cameo as a pianist playing in his apartment above the room where Rachel takes piano lessons. This portrayal is based on a Al Hirschfeld caricature of him.

=== Piano Concerto No. 2, Allegro, Opus 102 ===
- The Tin Soldier is based on Hans Christian Andersen's Tin Soldier. He falls in love with the Ballerina before being thrown out of the window and into a waste pipe by the Jack-in-the-Box. The waste pipe leads to the sea, where he is swallowed by a fish caught by the young boy's mother. After escaping from the fish and defeating the Jack-in-the-Box, he and the Ballerina reunite.
- The Ballerina is based on Hans Christian Andersen's character, serving as the Tin Soldier's love interest.
- The Jack-in-the-Box antagonizes the Tin Soldier and the Ballerina after she rejects him.

=== Carnival of the Animals, Finale ===
- The Yo-Yo Flamingo likes playing with a yo-yo, which irritates the other flamingos. Though they try to take away his yo-yo, he kept spares. He also appears in House of Mouse.
- The Snooty Flamingos pride themselves on uniformity and grace, wishing their other member to join the ranks and act the same. They are so frustrated by the yo-yo that they take his yo-yo before he ties them up with a spare yo-yo.

=== Noah's Ark (Pomp and Circumstance – Marches 1, 2, 3 and 4) ===
Noah builds the Ark to save the animals from the flood, putting Donald Duck in charge of them.

=== Firebird Suite ===
- The Spring Sprite is a green woman-like spirit that has control over growth and makes plants sprout where she grows, except for the Firebird's mountain. When she explores the mountain, she upsets the firebird, who attacks her and burns the forest. She is then brought back to life by the elk, but is weakened and weeps over the destruction of the forest. However, she discovers that her tears bring life back to the forest and restores life to the land, including the mountain. Her appearance varies according to her surroundings.
- The elk befriends the Spring Sprite and saves her after the Firebird attacks.
- The Firebird is awoken by the Spring Sprite in a volcano and attacks her and the forest.

== Orchestral instruments ==
Leopold Stokowski and James Levine serve as conductors in the films.

=== Woodwinds ===
- Flute
- Alto flute
- Piccolo
- Oboe
- Cor anglais
- Soprano clarinet
- Bass clarinet
- Bassoon
- Contrabassoon
- Sopranino saxophone
- Soprano saxophone
- Alto saxophone
- Tenor saxophone
- Baritone saxophone

=== Brass ===
- French horn
- Trumpet
- Tenor trombone
- Bass trombone
- Saxhorns
- Tubas
- Sousaphone
- Cornets
- Wagner tuba
- Euphonium
- Flugelhorn

=== Percussion ===
- Xylophone
- Vibraphone
- Marimba
- Glockenspiel
- Snare drum
- Field drum
- Bass drum
- Guillotine drum
- Timpani
- Cymbal
- Triangle
- Castanets
- Maracas
- Tambourine
- Tubular bells
- Gong
- Celesta

=== Strings ===
- Violin
- Viola
- Cello
- Double bass
- Harp
- Guitar
- Banjo

== Fantasia: Music Evolved characters ==
- Percy (voiced by Greg Ellis) is a wisp-like being who serves as the player's guide in Fantasia: Music Evolved, teaching them the basics and guiding them throughout the realms.
- Scout (voiced by Jacqueline Emerson) is Yen Sid's former apprentice. She unintentionally releases the Noise and tasks the player with defeating it.
