= Disney Princess Enchanted Tales: Follow Your Dreams =

- DVD cover
- Directed by: David Block
- Written by: Shirley Pierce
- Produced by: Kurt Albrecht; Douglas Segal
- Starring: Erin Torpey; Linda Larkin; Corey Burton; Gilbert Gottfried; Lea Salonga; Barbara Dirikson; Jeff Bennett; Roger Craig Smith; Russi Taylor; Tress MacNeille; Tara Strong; Zack Shada; Flo Di Re; Frank Welker
- Narrated by: Susanne Blakeslee
- Edited by: Kevin Locarro
- Music by: Jeff Danna (score); Amy Powers; Russ DeSalvo; Denise Gruska; Shirley Pierce
- Production company: Disneytoon Studios (Note: Animation outsourced to Toon City Animation.)
- Distributed by: Walt Disney Studios Home Entertainment (Note: Released through the Walt Disney Pictures banner.)
- Release date: September 4, 2007
- Running time: 56 minutes
- Country: United States
- Language: English

Disney Princess Enchanted Tales: Follow Your Dreams is a 2007 American anthology direct-to-video animated musical film produced by Walt Disney Pictures and Disneytoon Studios. It was the first and only film released for a planned Disney Princess Enchanted Tales series of direct-to-video films, each featuring new stories about the Disney Princesses. It was released on September 4, 2007, by Walt Disney Studios Home Entertainment.

The film features new stories about Aurora from Sleeping Beauty (1959) and Jasmine from Aladdin (1992).

== Segments ==
=== Keys to the Kingdom ===
Keys to the Kingdom features characters from Disney's Sleeping Beauty taking place after the original film. King Stefan, Queen Leah, King Hubert and Prince Phillip have left the kingdom for two days for a Royal Conference, leaving Aurora to reign over it in their absence. The three good fairies, Flora, Fauna and Merryweather offer to help her, but Aurora declines their offer because she believes she can do it alone. Merryweather gives Aurora her wand in case she needs any assistance and warns her to be very careful with it. The fairies also gave King Hubert his speech, which he forgot. With the assistance of the castle majordomo, Lord Duke, Aurora's tasks include planning banquets, dealing with peasants, and organizing servants who look after the kitchens and the gardens. Aurora believes she can do her job without the use of the wand, but later at night before bed, Aurora can't help but play with it and uses magic to make herself a big yellow ballgown. Eventually, after a long day dealing with complaints, Aurora gives in and uses the wand to help a local farmer in need of new chickens, pigs and cows. Her magical inexperience leads to unusual consequences, including massive chickens, green pigs, and transforming the farmer into a duck. When Stefan, Hubert, Leah, and Phillip are about to enter the castle from a royal conference, Lord Duke warns them about giant chickens, green pigs, and cows. After Aurora realizes that using the wand was a mistake, she promptly comes up with ideas to solve the problems on her own just before her parents, Duke, Hubert, Phillip, and the fairies arrived, only to see that they were no giant chickens, green pigs, and cows. At the end of the first segment, they attend the royal banquet, hosted by Aurora.

=== More Than a Peacock Princess ===
More Than a Peacock Princess features characters from Disney's Aladdin and takes place sometime after Aladdin and the King of Thieves with Iago returning to Agrabah. Jasmine is tired and bored with her usual princess duties. She is no longer satisfied with overseeing shop openings and assisting in the sale of a camel at the local market place. While having her portrait painted as a "Peacock Princess," Jasmine loses patience and says she wants more responsibility. The Sultan gives her the job of "Royal Assistant Educator" at the Royal Academy. Jasmine is thrilled until she meets her pupils. They misbehave, draw on the walls, pillow fight, and throw books. She calls her pet tiger Rajah to scare the children into behaving, but they ignore him before chasing him and Jasmine into the mud and up a tree. Jasmine gives up. Later that night, her lady-in-waiting tells her that she needs patience and perseverance and that with these tools, she can do anything she wants. The next day, Hakeem, the stable boy, seeks Jasmine's help. The Sultan's prized horse, Sahara, is missing from the Stables and if he isn't located, Hakeem will lose his job. Jasmine takes it upon herself, with Carpet, Abu, and Iago's help, to find Sahara and return him to the Palace. Upon returning with Sahara she is able to gain the respect of the students at the school and her father.

== Cast ==
- Susanne Blakeslee as The Narrator

=== Keys to the Kingdom ===
- Erin Torpey as Aurora
  - Cassidy Ladden as Aurora (singing)
- Corey Burton as King Stefan
- Barbara Dirikson as Queen Leah, Flora
- Jeff Bennett as Lord Duke, King Hubert, Arguing Neighbor #1, Farmer
- Roger Craig Smith as Prince Phillip
- Russi Taylor as Fauna
- Tress MacNeille as Merryweather
- S. Scott Bullock as Arguing Neighbor #2

=== More Than a Peacock Princess ===
- Linda Larkin as Jasmine
  - Lea Salonga as Jasmine (singing)
- Jeff Bennett as The Sultan, Painter
- Gilbert Gottfried as Iago
- Frank Welker as Abu, Rajah
- Flo Di Re as Aneesa
- Zack Shada as Hakeem
- Tara Strong as Sharma

== Songs ==
- "Keys to the Kingdom" - Lyrics and Music by Amy Powers and Russ DeSalvo, Performed by Cassidy Ladden
- "Peacock Princess" - Lyrics and Music by Amy Powers and Russ DeSalvo, Performed by Lea Salonga and Gilbert Gottfried
- "I've Got My Eyes on You" - Lyrics and Music by Amy Powers and Russ DeSalvo, Performed by Lea Salonga

== Production and cancelled series ==
This film was originally intended to be the first of a series of spinoffs "in which short stories about the various princesses from the Disney canon were paired according to some thematic overlap". Originally, the first film in the series was to be titled A Kingdom of Kindness and feature a completely different Aurora story as well as a story about Belle from Beauty and the Beast rather than Jasmine. Trailers were released for this installment on various Disney DVDs, but it was never released. A music video featuring the song "You'll Never Lose This Love" sung by Belle, originally planned for A Kingdom of Kindness, was included as a bonus feature on the Follow Your Dreams DVD. The second film in the series, referred to simply as Disney Princess Enchanted Tales in previews on various Disney Princess related DVDs, was originally scheduled for a 2008 release. It was to have a new Cinderella story as well as a new Mulan story. It too was never released, due to poor sales of Follow Your Dreams.

The fan blog Antagony & Ecstasy speculates that this specific project was the catalyst for newly appointed Chief Creative Officer for Disney animated projects John Lasseter shutting down all DisneyToon Studios sequel projects that weren't too far into production.

Initially, after the release of Follow Your Dreams, there was planned to be an entire series of Enchanted Tales direct-to-video film installments. However, after Disneytoon Studios president Sharon Morrill stepped down in June 2007, and the animation studio units under the Walt Disney Company underwent into a corporate restructuring as the Pixar leadership assumed more control, the film series was cancelled.

== Critical reception ==
The reviews for the movie ranged from mixed to negative. Common Sense Media assessed that the film had "perseverance lessons for princess fans ages 3-6" and gave it a rating of 2 out of 5 stars. It noted the prevalent themes of "follow your dreams and never give up", the "plucky, brave and determined" role model nature of the princess protagonists, and the notion that "as a Disney property, this film inevitably works as brand reinforcement for the Disney Princess line of products." CineMagazine gave the film a rating of 2 out of 5 stars, noting: "It is unfortunate that the two stories have such varying quality. If it had been a little more balanced then [the film could have] become a great movie. Now it remains weak due to the Sleeping Beauty segment being entirely mediocre and barely worthy of Disney". It concluded that this project was focused on turning a profit than upholding artistic integrity".

Antagony & Ecstasy described it as "the first in an aborted attempt to create a new series of cheap-even-by-the-standards-of-cheapquels videos", and concluded "I cannot entirely hate this dreadful little cast-off. It's too short; it's too ebulliently random; and it might very well be the reason that the Disney sequels were finally strangled to death." AnimatedReviews said "This is Disney Product with a capital P" and "I thought Disney had turned a corner in getting away from this low-level quality, but this is just poor, poor, poor". It added "Personally, I’d like to see this kind of thing where it belongs" which is on a television show called "Disney Princesses, with a new episode with a different Princess every time", as opposed to dressing up things like this, Cinderella II, and Belle’s Magical World as movies.

DVDizzy said "It is hard to praise a pairing of two half-hour "movies", created with standards not much higher than those of a Saturday morning cartoon, that are being marketed as a full-length movie". In a review of the DVD, InsidePulse said "The special features with the games are aimed at girls and Lord knows you won’t enjoy them unless you’re under the age of...6 years." It added that it "does provide a modicum in fun in that it lets us see these winning characters again and more of their lives. But in contrast to the excitement and entertainment of their big screen outings, their lives here are a bit boring and didactic."

Mary Costa, the original voice of Aurora, was not fond of this film and felt that it did not work.

=== Awards ===
Year	Nominee / work	Award	Result	Refs
2008	Amy Powers, Russ DeSalvo and Jeff Danna	Annie Award for Music in a Feature Production	Nominated	
