= Isobelle Molloy =

English actress

- Born: Isobelle Rose Molloy
- Occupation: Actress
- Known for: Matilda the Musical, Maleficent

Isobelle Molloy is an English actress, best known for her portrayal of Amanda and later, Matilda Wormwood in the West End version of Matilda the Musical. She had her film debut as Young Maleficent in the 2014 Disney fantasy film, Maleficent.

== Early life and education ==
Isobelle Molloy was raised by her mother, Leanne Cornwell. She has one sibling, an older brother. Prior to 2012, she lived in Springfield, Essex and attended Tomorrow's Talent theatre school in Little Waltham.

Her family later moved to Maidenhead so she could attend Redroofs Theatre School after being awarded a full scholarship when the director of the school saw her performance as Matilda.

== Career ==
Molloy began her career as a dancer when she was three.
Aged 11, she portrayed Amanda Thripp, a pig-tailed schoolgirl in the West End version of Matilda the Musical since the show began in November 2011.

After the two actresses who portrayed Matilda Wormwood at that time had left, Molloy took over the title role, starting from 15 April 2012 at the Cambridge Theatre. "I only had to do two auditions before they offered me the role and to be honest I was shocked," said Molloy, expressing her feelings when getting the role. "But I am not nervous about taking over as Matilda, I know the show, the stage and all the adults in the cast so it will be a lot easier for me."

Molloy made her film debut playing the role of Young Maleficent in Disney's 2014 fantasy film Maleficent, a live-action reimagining of the 1959 film Sleeping Beauty. She was given the part after a casting director spotted her when she performed the title role of Matilda The Musical.

== Filmography ==
=== Film ===
Year	Title	Role	Notes
2014	Maleficent	Young Maleficent	
2016	Una	Holly	

=== Theatre ===
Year	Production	Role	Notes
2010	Oliver!	Workhouse Child	2010 - 2011
2011	Matilda the Musical	Amanda Thripp	November 2011 - April 2012
2011	Matilda the Musical	Matilda Wormwood	15 April 2012 - August 2012

=== Television ===
Year	Title	Role	Notes
	Comic Relief	Tilly	
2013-14	EastEnders	Bella Young	
2021	Whitstable Pearl	Ruby Williams	6 episodes
