= Maleficent (film) =

2014 American film

- Theatrical release poster
- Directed by: Robert Stromberg
- Screenplay by: Linda Woolverton
- Based on: Disney's Sleeping Beauty; "La Belle au bois dormant" by Charles Perrault
- Produced by: Joe Roth
- Starring: Angelina Jolie; Sharlto Copley; Elle Fanning; Sam Riley; Imelda Staunton; Juno Temple; Lesley Manville
- Cinematography: Dean Semler
- Edited by: Chris Lebenzon; Richard Pearson
- Music by: James Newton Howard
- Production companies: Walt Disney Pictures; Roth Films
- Distributed by: Walt Disney Studios Motion Pictures
- Release dates: May 28, 2014 (El Capitan Theatre); May 30, 2014 (United States)
- Running time: 97 minutes
- Country: United States
- Language: English
- Budget: $180–263 million
- Box office: $759.8 million

Maleficent is a 2014 American fantasy film starring Angelina Jolie as the title character in a live-action retelling of her villainous role in Walt Disney's 1959 animated film Sleeping Beauty, itself an adaptation of the 1697 fairy tale. The film was directed by Robert Stromberg and written by Linda Woolverton. It also stars Sharlto Copley, Elle Fanning, Sam Riley, Imelda Staunton, Juno Temple, and Lesley Manville.

Maleficent was originally developed as an animated project in 2003, before it was changed to a live-action feature in 2006, following Disney's acquisition of Pixar. Tim Burton was originally attached to direct the film, but was replaced by Stromberg in his directorial debut. Jolie signed on to play the title role in January 2012 and also served as the film's executive producer. The rest of the main cast joined between March and May 2012. Principal photography took place at Pinewood Studios in Buckinghamshire, England, from June to October 2012.

Maleficent premiered in El Capitan Theatre in Hollywood on May 28, 2014, and was released in the United States theatrically on May 30 by Walt Disney Studios Motion Pictures. It received mixed reviews from critics and was a commercial success, grossing over $758 million worldwide and becoming the fourth-highest-grossing film of 2014. It received an Academy Award nomination for Best Costume Design at the 87th Academy Awards. A sequel, Maleficent: Mistress of Evil, was released in 2019.

== Plot ==
Maleficent is a powerful fairy living in the Moors, a magical forest realm. As a child, she meets a human boy named Stefan, and they fall in love with each other. However, as they get older, they grow apart, with Stefan's love overshadowed by his ambition to be king, while Maleficent becomes protector of the Moors.

When King Henry attempts to conquer the Moors, Maleficent mortally wounds him. On his deathbed, he declares whoever kills her will be king. Stefan visits Maleficent and drugs her. Unwilling to kill her, Stefan instead uses a bracelet made of iron, which is lethal to fairies, to burn off her wings and presents them as "proof" of her death. While distraught by her loss, Maleficent saves Diaval, a trapped raven, from a farmer by turning him into a human. Diaval offers his service and tells her of Stefan's coronation. Infuriated over the betrayal, Maleficent grows cruel and bitter, ruling the Moors with an iron fist.

Years later, Diaval informs Maleficent about the christening of Stefan's newborn daughter, Aurora. Maleficent arrives uninvited while three pixies, Knotgrass, Flittle, and Thistlewit, are bestowing magic gifts, and places a curse on Aurora: before the sun sets on Aurora's 16th birthday, Aurora will prick her finger on the spindle of a spinning wheel and fall into a death-like sleep. Maleficent mocks Stefan's plea for mercy, but states Aurora's curse can be broken by true love's kiss, which she and Stefan both believe is nonexistent. Stefan orders the pixies to hide and protect Aurora in a forest cottage until after her 16th birthday. He also destroys every spinning wheel in the kingdom, hiding their remnants in the castle dungeon; he then sends his army after Maleficent, but she surrounds the Moors with a wall of thorns. Over the years, Stefan begins mass-manufacturing iron weapons nonstop and grows obsessed with killing Maleficent to the point of insanity, even refusing to see his wife on her deathbed.

Maleficent and Diaval watch Aurora grow from afar, and secretly begin taking over care of her from the incompetent pixies. After several face-to-face encounters with Maleficent, whom she regards as her "fairy godmother", Aurora bonds with her and regularly visits the Moors. Realizing she does not have the heart to hurt Aurora, Maleficent privately and unsuccessfully attempts undoing Aurora's curse, forgetting she made "no power on earth" able to do so. Meanwhile, Aurora meets Philip, a prince from the neighboring kingdom, and both take a liking to each other.

Before Aurora's 16th birthday, Maleficent allows her to live in the Moors. However, the pixies are eventually forced to tell Aurora the truth about her family and the curse. Hurt and betrayed, Aurora confronts Maleficent and returns to her father's castle, where King Stefan imprisons her and scolds the pixies for failing to protect her. As night falls, the curse takes control of Aurora, leading her to a spinning wheel where she pricks her finger and falls into a deep, death-like sleep.

Wanting to save Aurora, Maleficent and Diaval kidnap Prince Philip and sneak into the castle, but Philip’s kiss cannot wake her. Filled with regret, Maleficent says goodbye to Aurora and kisses her forehead with genuine maternal love, which finally breaks the curse and awakens her.

As they try to escape, Stefan and his guards attack them. Maleficent turns Diaval into a dragon, but they are eventually overpowered. Aurora frees Maleficent's wings, allowing her to fight back. Although Maleficent refuses to kill Stefan and tries to end the conflict peacefully, he attacks her again and falls to his death from the tower.

After Stefan's death, Maleficent removes the thorn wall, restores the Moors, and crowns Aurora as ruler, bringing peace between the two kingdoms. Aurora also begins a romance with Philip. The narrator reveals herself as the elderly Aurora, the one people called, the "Sleeping Beauty".

== Cast ==
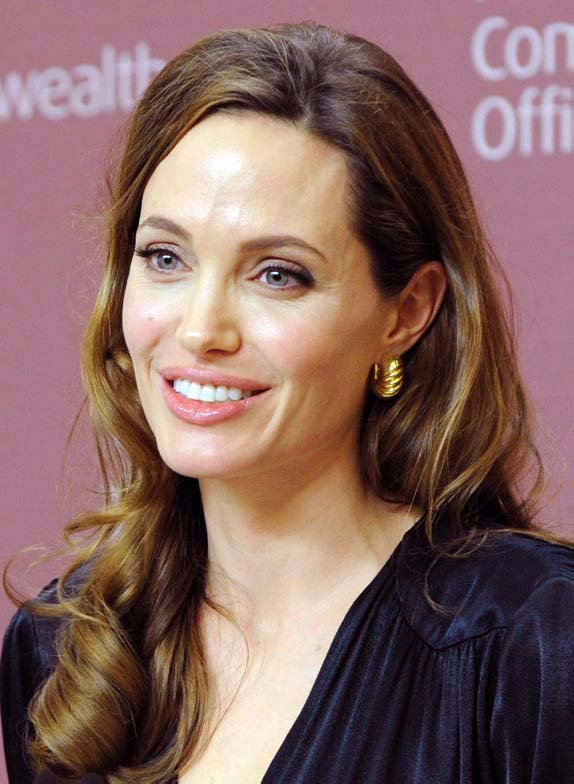
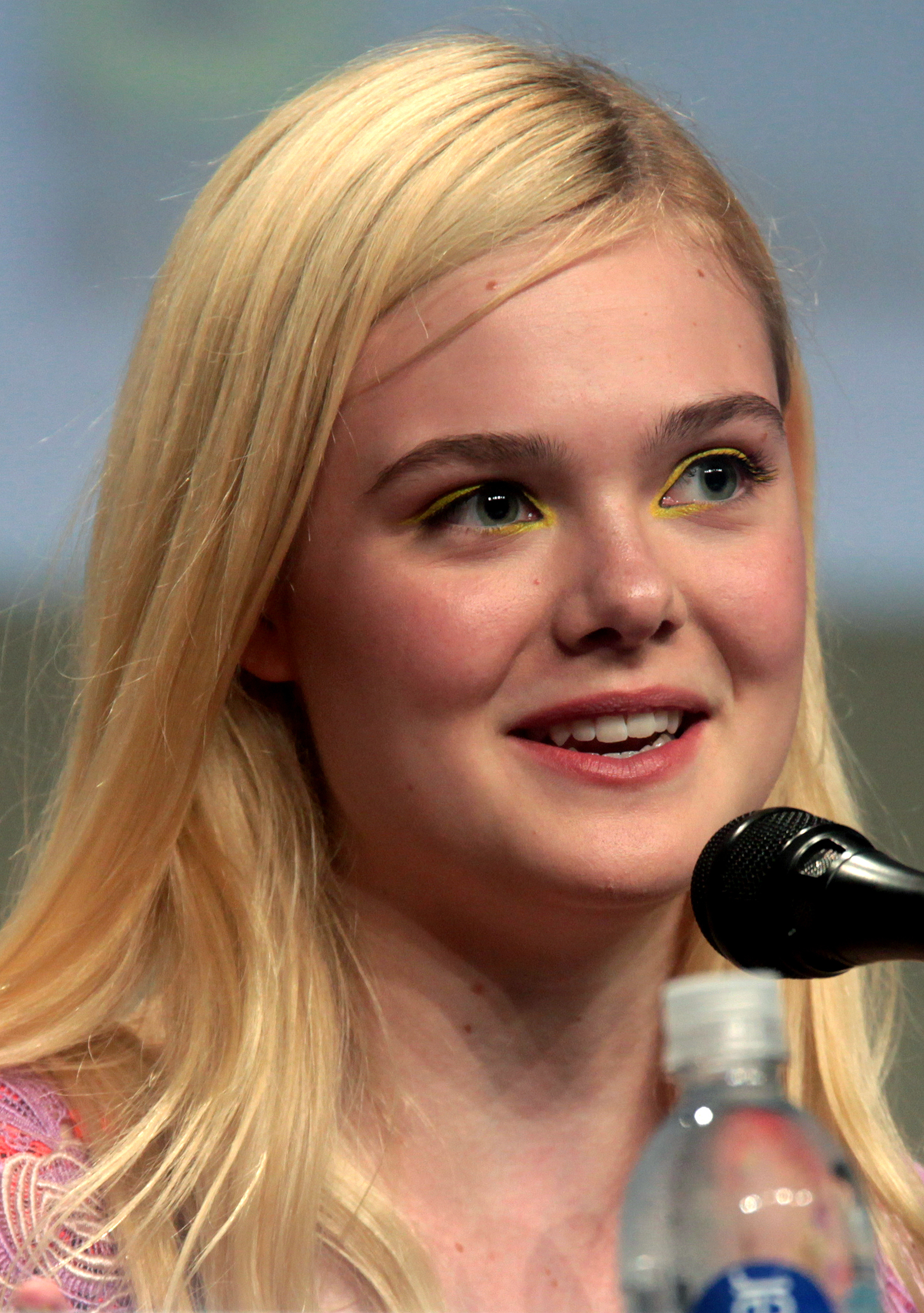
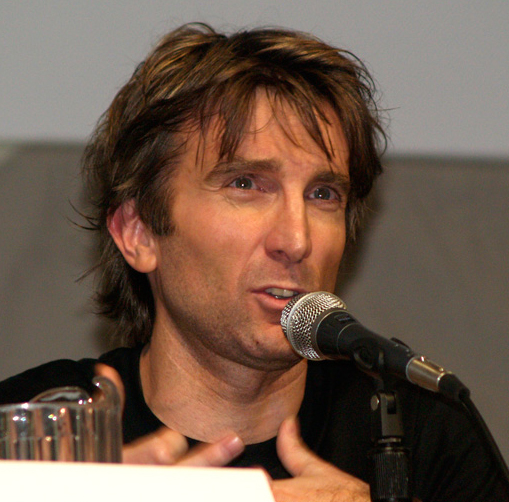
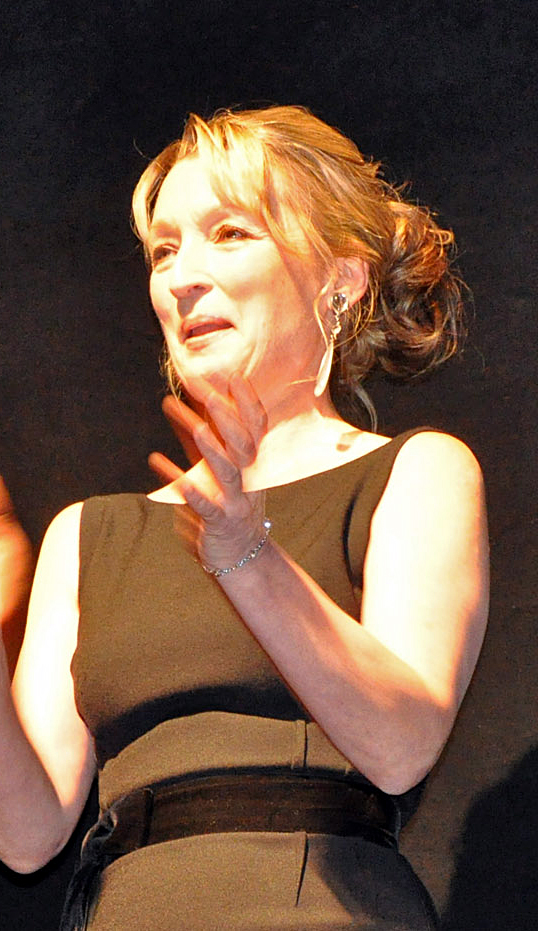
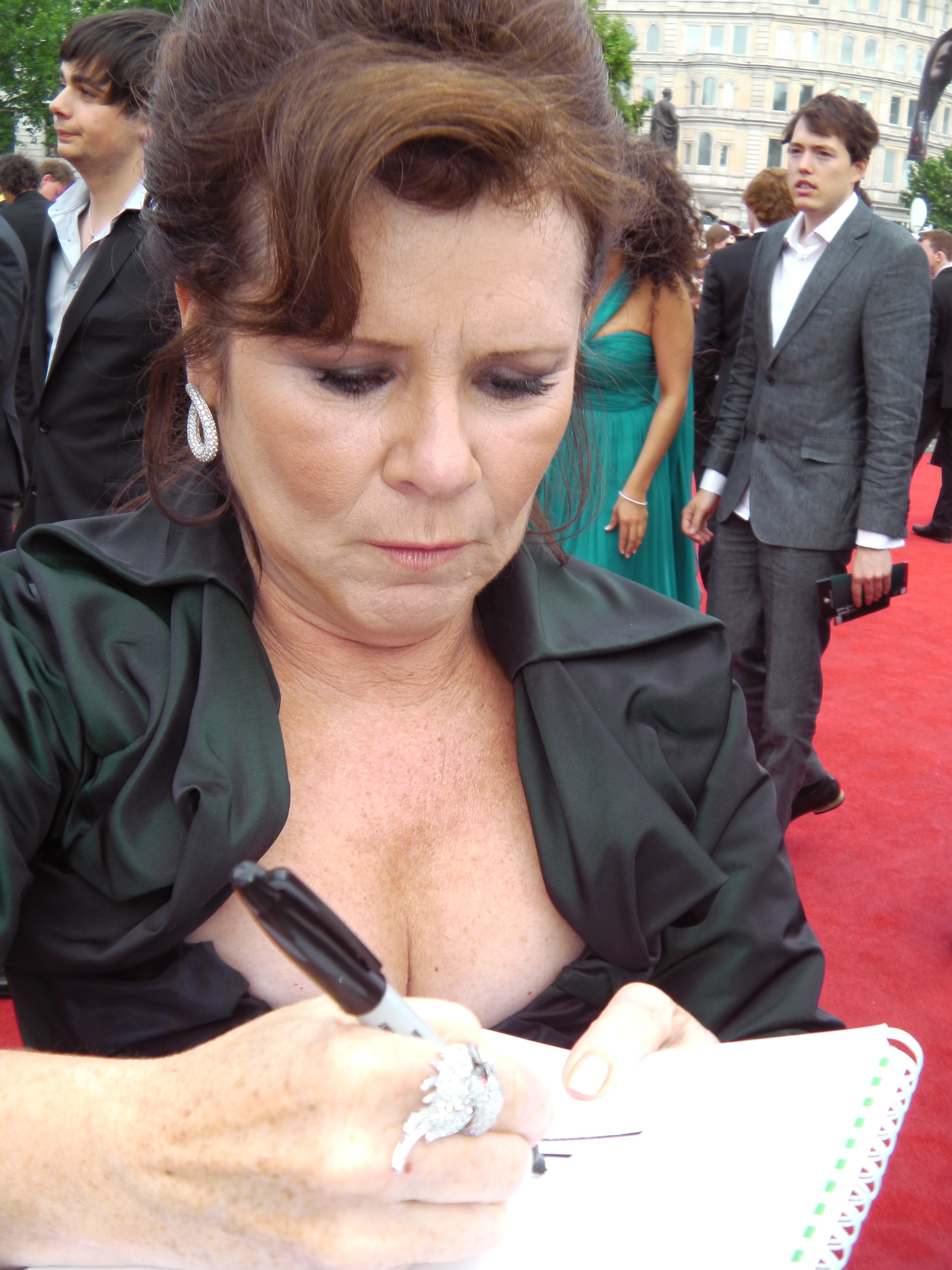
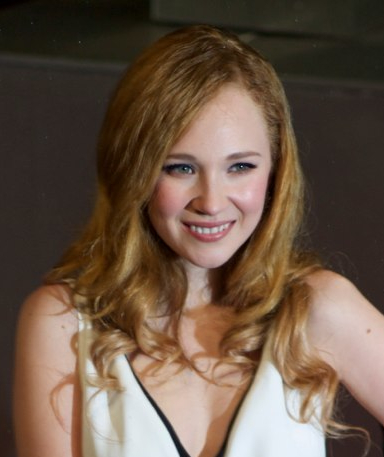
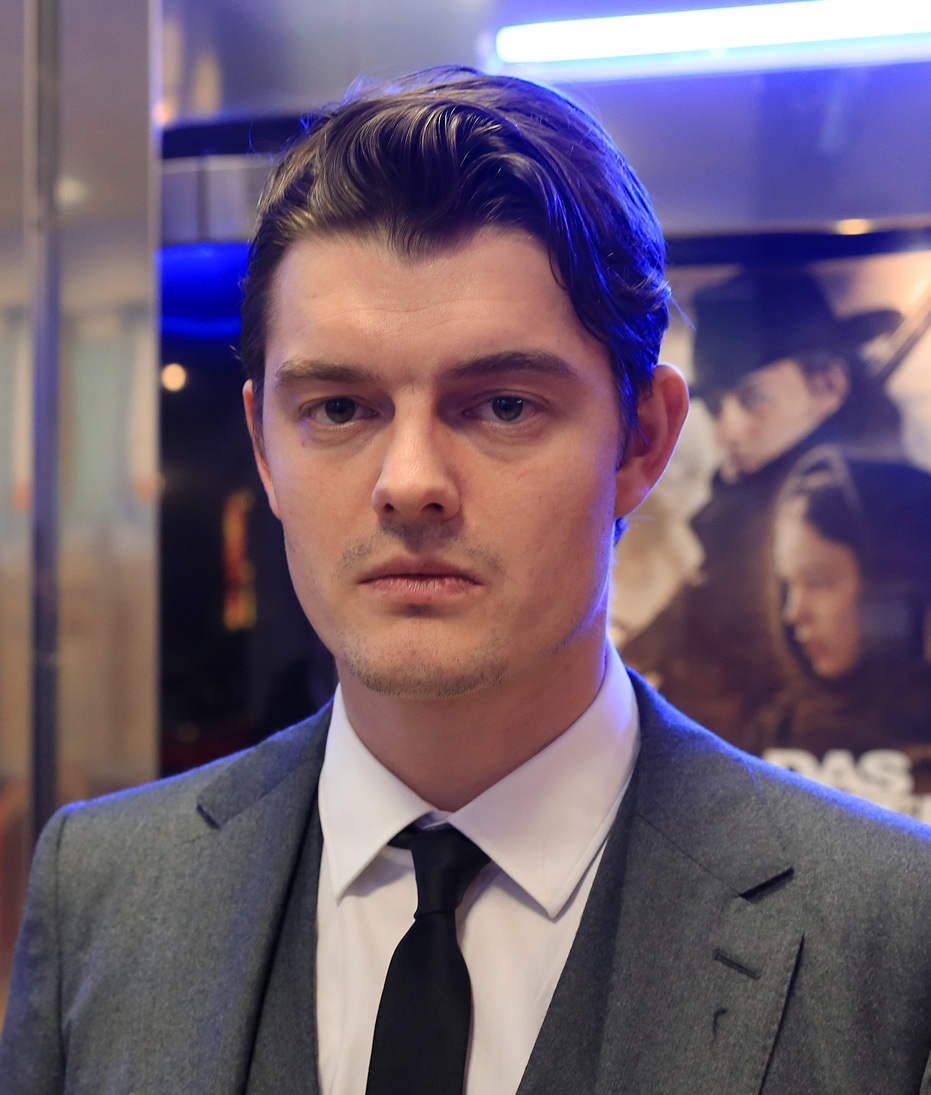
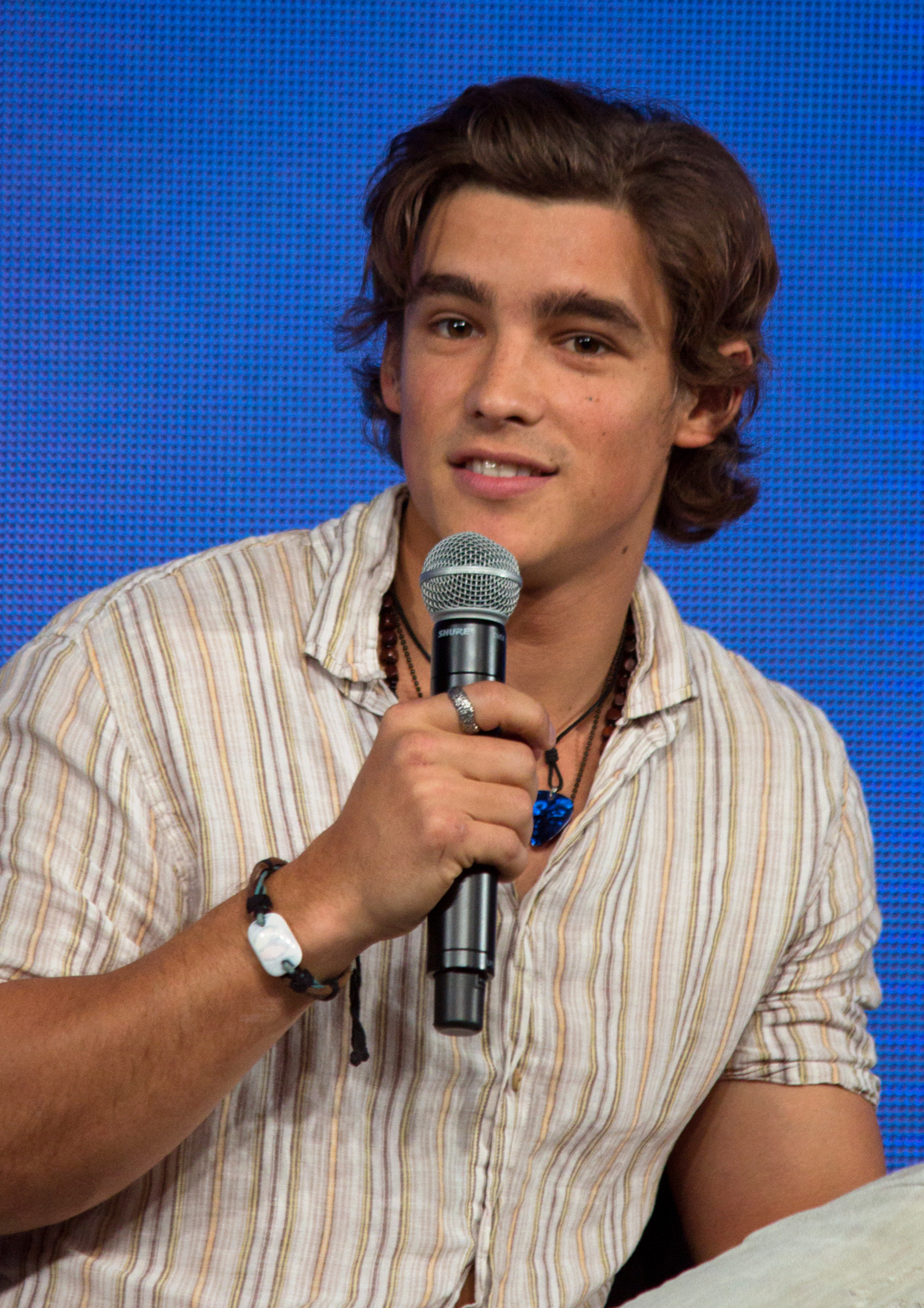
Top row: Angelina Jolie, Elle Fanning, Sharlto Copley, and Leslie Manville play Maleficent, Aurora, Stefan, and Flittle.
Bottom row: Imelda Staunton, Juno Temple, Sam Riley, and Brenton Thwaites play Knotgrass, Thistlewit, Diaval, and Prince Philip.
- Angelina Jolie as Maleficent, a fierce and vindictive protector of the Moors who, in revenge for the betrayal by her former lover Stefan, places a curse on his daughter Aurora. Unlike her animated counterpart, this version of the character is portrayed more sympathetically. As the film progresses, Maleficent turns from a victim into a villain, following Stefan's betrayal, and finally into a hero because of the maternal feelings she develops for Aurora. Jolie described her character as "slightly insane, extremely vibrant, a little wicked, and has a big sense of humor, so she's quite full-on. She's one of those characters that, for me, you couldn't do halfway." She further admitted that Maleficent was one of the most difficult characters that she had ever played because "she represents all sides of what it is to be human, even though she is not… For me, the journey of playing her has been much heavier, much more emotional, and much more difficult an experience than I expected."
  - Isobelle Molloy as Young Maleficent.
  - Ella Purnell as Teen Maleficent.
- Elle Fanning as Aurora, also known as Sleeping Beauty, an innocent, pure-hearted, and free-spirited daughter of Stefan and Leila who falls under Maleficent's curse. Fanning described her character as "very free spirited, and since she has been kept away from normal life, she's very open to things and innocent. But that's what makes her very likable and charming." Robert Stromberg highlighted the contrast between Aurora and Maleficent, which he described as the "beacon of light vs. darkness… It reminds me a little of the girl plucking petals from the flower in Frankenstein. It's such a wonderful contrast and the joy in making this film was bringing those two elements together and discovering things that we normally wouldn't know."
  - Vivienne Jolie as 5-year-old Aurora.
  - Eleanor Worthington Cox as 8-year-old Aurora.
  - Janet McTeer as an elderly Aurora, who serves as the film's narrator.
- Sharlto Copley as Stefan, Aurora's ambitious and vengeful father and Maleficent's former childhood friend/lover, who cuts off the latter's wings to become the king. Unlike his animated counterpart, this version of the character is portrayed in a more antagonistic light. Commenting on his character, Copley said that "it was an opportunity to play a character that was almost like a cautionary tale for men… To have a character like Stefan, who has what most men have, which is a desire to be ambitious, and driven, and the proverbial king of his castle. He literally becomes the king of his castle, but is prepared to sacrifice his true love to get there… It was an interesting character and opportunity to play that kind of male ego running away with itself."
  - Michael Higgins as Young Stefan.
  - Jackson Bews as Teen Stefan.
- Lesley Manville, Imelda Staunton, and Juno Temple as Flittle, Knotgrass, and Thistlewit, a trio of incompetent and inept pixies whom Stefan charges with taking care of Aurora until her sixteenth birthday. These versions of the characters are markedly different from their animated counterparts (named Flora, Fauna, and Merryweather), with their role being reduced to comic relief. Commenting on her character, Manville said that Flittle is "incredibly proud of her special magical power that allows her to turn things blue. She can turn everything blue and she thinks everything should be blue as well." Staunton described Knotgrass as "the most important pixie – in her own head. Very bossy, very organized, has to control everything. There are three pixies and she is the self-appointed grown-up among them." According to Temple, Thistlewit is "the youngest member and she is definitely more 'away with the fairies' than the other two. She's more distracted by nature. She wants to smell flowers and she wants to dance around, so she's a much younger free spirit."
- Sam Riley as Diaval, Maleficent's shape-shifting raven companion. Riley described his character as "Maleficent's loyal ally who can fly to places and spy for her. Their relationship blooms and Diaval develops an affection for her. He's the only character who's capable of telling her when she becomes a little overwrought and who really knows what she's thinking." Stromberg elaborated that Diaval is "the conscience in the ear of Maleficent at all times. He helps her down the path of finding out who she is. He comes at the lowest point in Maleficent's life and becomes, in addition to Aurora, the other character that really pulls Maleficent out of her dark hole."

The film also features Brenton Thwaites as Philip, a prince who befriends and falls in love with Aurora. Kenneth Cranham portrays King Henry, Stefan's predecessor and Leila's father, whose efforts to conquer the Moors get him slain by Maleficent. Hannah New portrays Princess Leila, King Henry's daughter, Stefan's wife, and Aurora's mother. New described her character as a "demure, untouchable princess."

== Production ==
=== Development ===
It was about 2003, maybe, when we're sitting around one day, asking, "Who is a really strong and interesting female character we can base a movie on," and somebody said "Maleficent," but I can't point out exactly who it was. It made sense, because she was this really popular villainess who is glamorous and like a runway model. Still, she's been wounded somehow in the past. We thought we could do a Wicked thing with Maleficent and show her backstory. That was just the germ of the idea and it sat in animation for a while. We did some development and some drawings on it, but then it went pretty quickly over to live-action, where it sat.

— Don Hahn, on developing the idea for Maleficent

The idea for Maleficent was conceived during Don Hahn's meeting with the Disney's animation department in 2003, where it was pitched as an animation project revolving around the origin of the eponymous antagonist from Walt Disney's animated film Sleeping Beauty (1959). The timing of the idea was inspired by the just-released Broadway musical Wicked. While opening the musical adaptation of Mary Poppins in the West End of London in December 2004, Hahn met with Tim Burton to pitch him several movie ideas for Disney, including Maleficent, which Burton was instantly interested in. Simultaneously, Sean Bailey (who was an independent producer at the time) began developing the same concept for a live-action feature, which he envisioned as a "Disney version of Michael Corleone in The Godfather. Have a character do something that's empirically terrible – curse a child – but set it up in such a way that you felt differently about it." Bailey wanted Angelina Jolie for the role of Maleficent and mentioned the idea during lunch with Jolie's manager, receiving a positive response within a few hours. When Bailey presented his concept to the Disney executives, they told him about Hahn's project and suggested they team up. Jolie's interest in the title role prompted the filmmakers to consider moving Maleficent from animation to live-action, which they did after Disney acquired Pixar and reshuffled the animation department in 2006. The project was eventually suspended due to Burton being busy working on Sweeney Todd: The Demon Barber of Fleet Street and Alice in Wonderland.

By the summer of 2009, as Alice in Wonderland entered post-production, Burton renewed his interest in Maleficent. Around the same time, Hahn approached Linda Woolverton (who had just collaborated with Burton on Alice) to write the script. Burton dismissed his involvement with the film as a rumor in February 2010, but the following month, The Guardian reported that he would helm the project, with The Hollywood Reporter confirming Woolverton as the film's writer. At that point, Richard D. Zanuck also joined the production as a producer (until his death in 2012). After Woolverton boarded the project, the creative team (which included Woolverton, Burton, Hahn, and Zanuck) began developing the story, with several drafts made over the course of almost a year. In November 2010, Burton confirmed that he would direct Maleficent, but he had withdrawn by May 2011, due to his commitment to Dark Shadows. After Burton's departure, David Yates, Darren Aronofsky, and David O. Russell were considered to take over as director. Guillermo del Toro also expressed interest in directing Maleficent, citing the original 1959 animated film as one of his favorite Disney features. By September 2011, Joe Roth had joined the project as a producer, and in January 2012, Deadline Hollywood reported that Robert Stromberg (who had been the production designer on Alice in Wonderland) would helm Maleficent in his directorial debut. Palak Patel (the film's executive producer) said that after finishing Alice, Stromberg "really wanted to direct. We said, 'Okay, but we've got Oz the Great and Powerful and we need a production designer. Why don't you do Oz, then we'll make a movie.' In the middle of shooting [Oz], Maleficent came in."

=== Writing ===
After watching the [1959 animated] movie, I came up with some ideas that revealed more about [Maleficent's] character. I created a past for her that leads to the singular moment in which she curses the baby Aurora and then takes us past that moment from Maleficent's point of view through the ending of the film. But it's a reinvention; it's not just a retelling of the same story… The character really is fantastic and once we had Angelina Jolie, my task was to seamlessly meld the two into one to recreate a classic, but wholly unique Maleficent.

— Linda Woolverton, on developing the story of Maleficent

Linda Woolverton's screenplay went through at least 15 versions as the film progressed in production. Stromberg said: "I met many times with Linda Woolverton, the writer. We did lots of roundtable discussions and sort of cut out the fat as much as we could and sort of purified the storyline as much as we could". Paul Dini also performed rewrites on the project with Stromberg, and was credited in early press. In some earlier versions of the story, Stefan was the half-human, half-fairy bastard son of King Henry. The version of the screenplay that went into shooting originally included two characters called Queen Ulla and King Kinloch, the fairy queen and fairy king of the Moors and the aunt and uncle of Maleficent. Miranda Richardson and Peter Capaldi were cast and shot the Queen Ulla and King Kinloch scenes, but their roles were cut in the editing process together with more than 15 minutes of the first act of the film. Stromberg said, "We spent a bit more time originally in the fairy world before we got into the human side of things ... we wanted to get it [the film] under two hours. So we cut about 15 minutes out of the first act, and then that had to be seamed together with some pretty basic reshoots."

Stromberg later claimed in an interview that he employed an "age-old" emotional storytelling for the film and called it "the biggest thrill" against all technology advances. "And the way we play with that is we have somebody who's perhaps in love but betrayed and doesn't believe that true love exists. So the moral to it is we can all feel dark ourselves but not to lose hope because there is light in places where we might not be expecting", he explained.

=== Casting ===
It's one of those rare movies where there wasn't a list. It was just about [Angelina Jolie], and she came on really early on. The first person I pitched it to, as a director, was Tim Burton. Even then, she was circling the project. Tim had worked with Linda Woolverton, so we brought her in, as a writer. Eventually, he had some scheduling problems and had to go off and do Sweeney Todd, but [Jolie] was always circling it. She loves this character, and this character has a lot of layers to it. There's a facade that this character puts up, that seems very in control, manipulative and able to deal with anything, but as you peel back the layers, you see that beneath that facade is a lot of hurt, anger and vulnerability. The way she plays it, as an actress, is brilliant 'cause she only shows you those cards when you need to see them.

— Don Hahn, on casting Angelina Jolie as Maleficent

Angelina Jolie was the first and only choice for the role of Maleficent. According to Don Hahn, they "never made a list of other choices because she seemed like she understood the flesh and blood of the character and could play the nuance." Both Sean Bailey and Joe Roth further stated that the film would not have been made if Jolie had refused. Jolie entered negotiations by March 2010, and signed on for the role in late January 2012, which she personally confirmed during the 62nd Berlin International Film Festival the following month. She was also hired as the film's executive producer. Jolie was initially unsure of making a film about "somebody who curses a baby", but was still interested in the idea because of her fascination with the character of Maleficent as a child, and ended up being "very moved" by the script. Her decision to accept the role was also influenced by the persuasions of her children and brother. Jolie earned an estimated $33 million for her role, which made her the highest-paid actress of 2013. Jolie performed with a British-influenced accent while portraying the title character, reflecting the longstanding convention of using British accents in medieval–fantasy productions to convey authority, nobility, or timelessness.

In March 2012, Elle Fanning was reported to be in talks for the role of Aurora. She was the only choice of the filmmakers after they saw her performance as Alice Dainard in Super 8 (2011). Roth said that he brought Fanning to the studio "literally the next day, told her all about the project, told her about [Angelina Jolie], and she said 'I'm in'." Later that month, Jim Sturgess and Gael García Bernal were reported to be trying out for the role of Diaval, with Jude Law (who had co-starred with Jolie in Sky Captain and the World of Tomorrow) in negotiations to play Stefan. Sharlto Copley was eventually cast as Stefan by May 2012, and a few days later, The Hollywood Reporter announced the casting of Imelda Staunton as Knotgrass, Kenneth Cranham as King Henry, Sam Riley as Diaval, Lesley Manville as Flittle, and Miranda Richardson as Queen Ulla (whose role was deleted from the final cut). On the same day, Variety reported that India Eisley would play the teenage version of Maleficent, and later that month, Juno Temple and Brenton Thwaites were cast as Thistlewit and Prince Philip. Anya Taylor-Joy later revealed that she also auditioned for the role of teenage Maleficent.

In August 2012, Vivienne Jolie (Jolie's real-life daughter with Brad Pitt) was announced to play 5-year-old Aurora. She was cast due to being the only child on the set who was not scared of Jolie in her full Maleficent costume. Jolie initially offered the role to her other daughter, Shiloh, but she refused. Two other children of Jolie, Pax and Zahara, ended up appearing as extras in the christening scene. Toby Regbo was originally cast as the teenage version of Stefan, but after the filmmakers decided that they needed a younger performer, he was replaced by Michael Higgins. By November 2012, Eleanor Worthington Cox and Isobelle Molloy were confirmed to play younger versions of Aurora and Maleficent, respectively. Molloy was brought to the attention of the filmmakers by the casting director, who saw her performance as the title character in the West End production of Matilda the Musical, and ended up doing three auditions (including a screen test) before she was cast. By October 2013, when it was decided to reshoot the film's prologue, Ella Purnell (who originally auditioned for the role of Aurora) replaced Eisley as teenage Maleficent. Purnell's casting was personally approved by Jolie, although they never met in person during the film's production.

=== Filming ===
Principal photography began on June 13, 2012, at Pinewood Studios. Some filming took place in the Buckinghamshire countryside near Turville.

==== Costume design ====
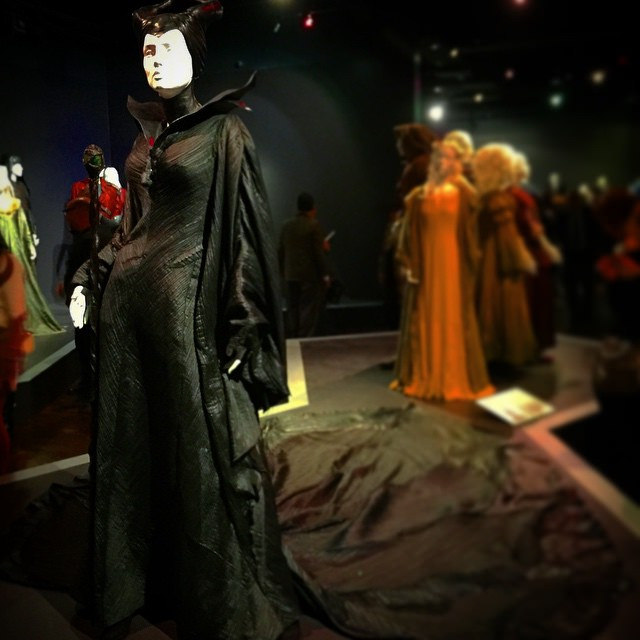
Maleficent's christening costume on display at FIDM Museum in 2016.

Anna B. Sheppard was in charge of designing costumes for the film. She was hired late in pre-production and had about eight weeks before filming began to create all the costumes from scratch, which she described as "a lot of pain, a lot of work, a lot of indecision". Sheppard and her team drew inspiration for the designs from French and Italian art of the Renaissance period (including paintings, sketches, and sculptures), creating more than two thousand costumes by hand.

For the character of Maleficent, a separate group within the costume department (named Team Maleficent) was formed to focus solely on her outfits.

For Aurora's costumes, Sheppard wanted to move away from the "hourglass silhouettes" of the character's animated counterpart in favor of more "innocent and closer to nature" designs, which she felt would be both more natural and age-appropriate for Elle Fanning (who was fourteen at the time of filming).

==== Reshoots ====
John Lee Hancock assisted Stromberg with reshoots for the film. Hancock, who had just finished overseeing the final post-production stages of Saving Mr. Banks, was approached by producer Joe Roth, with whom he had worked on Snow White and the Huntsman. Roth said: "He's not directing. He wrote pages, and I hired a first-time director, and it's good to have him on set." Roth was asked why a "film of this magnitude was entrusted to a novice director", and he noted that Stromberg won Academy Awards for production design on Avatar and Alice in Wonderland. Roth said: "The movie is gorgeous to look at, and the last 75 minutes are really entertaining. The issue was the opening, which was reshot over eight days."

=== Visual effects ===
As a previous production designer, Stromberg sought to balance the use of practical and computer-generated effects. For example, while Maleficent's horns and facial prosthetics were created by makeup artist Rick Baker, Digital Domain took facial capture of Imelda Staunton, Lesley Manville, and Juno Temple for the three pixies to be generated with high authenticity with the help of special rigging by Disney Research in Zurich. For the visuals, Stromberg wanted to make it "a bit more grounded" and "not too surreal" because it could be distracting from the simplicity of the story. He also regretted not employing bigger sets and allowing actors to work in a more tangible environment, on "real sets with real lights".

== Music ==
James Newton Howard was hired to score the film in October 2012. The film marked Howard's first live-action Disney film score, as he had previously scored three films from Walt Disney Animation Studios which include Dinosaur (2000), Atlantis: The Lost Empire (2001) and Treasure Planet (2002). On January 23, 2014, recording artist Lana Del Rey was announced as covering the song "Once Upon a Dream", from the 1959 film Sleeping Beauty, as the title song for Maleficent. The song "Once Upon a Dream" is based on the Grand Waltz from ballet Sleeping Beauty written by Russian composer Tchaikovsky. The single was released on January 26, 2014, during the 56th Grammy Awards and was made available for free for a limited time through Google Play. The soundtrack album, featuring Howard's score and Del Rey's cover of "Once Upon a Dream" was released on May 26, 2014, by Walt Disney Records.

== Marketing ==
On August 10, 2013, as part of the live-action motion-picture panel of the 2013 Disney D23 Expo in the Anaheim Convention Center at Anaheim, California, Disney unveiled its first look of Maleficent by revealing the new logo of the film's title and a one-minute clip from the film. Angelina Jolie made a surprise visit to the expo and talked with the attendees about her fascination with Disney's Sleeping Beauty as a child, her working experience with the filmmakers on the film, and her love of Disney. She also remarked on how she scared little girls when she was in costume, makeup, and acting during shooting; this led to the decision to hire her own daughter, Vivienne Jolie, for the role of the young Princess Aurora since she would not be scared of her during principal photography.

Walt Disney Pictures released the teaser poster for Maleficent on November 12, 2013, featuring Jolie in costume and makeup, akin to the character's depiction in the original film. The first trailer was released the following day, on November 13. The first teaser trailer was attached to Thor: The Dark World, The Hunger Games: Catching Fire, Frozen, and Vampire Academy: Blood Sisters. Two more trailers were released in January 2014, revealing Maleficent's appearance. A third trailer featured Lana Del Rey singing "Once Upon a Dream". The final trailer was released on March 18, 2014.

Starting April 18, 2014, Disney's Hollywood Studios and Disney California Adventure previewed the film inside the ABC Sound Studios and It's Tough to Be a Bug! theaters, respectively. A tie-in novelization of the film written by Elizabeth Rudnick was published by Disney Publishing Worldwide on April 29, 2014. Disney Infinity 2.0 featured Maleficent as a playable figure using the look from the film.

== Release ==
=== Theatrical ===
Maleficent was originally scheduled for a March 14, 2014 release, before it was changed to July 2, 2014. By September 2013, the film's release date was preponed to May 30, 2014, as Pixar's The Good Dinosaur faced production issues and was delayed to 2015. A private exhibition of props and costumes from the film was held at Kensington Palace in London on May 8, 2014, serving as a fundraiser for Great Ormond Street Hospital. The world premiere of Maleficent took place at the El Capitan Theatre in Hollywood on May 28, 2014.

On November 22, 2018, a one-time special screening of the film was held in Sofia, Bulgaria at New Bulgarian University, where Bulgarian actor Peter Baykov does the dubbing for every character in the film by changing his voice from male to female live. He later performs part of the film trailer live during the semi-finals on the Got Talent show in Bulgaria in 2019 which leads him to the season finale. He would later be cast as Prince Philip in the Bulgarian dub of the sequel, Maleficent: Mistress of Evil.

In September 2020, the film returned to cinemas in the United Kingdom following their reopening from closure due to the COVID-19 pandemic.

=== Commercial analysis ===
Dave Lewis, writing for HitFix, predicted that although Disney fairy tales and Angelina Jolie's performance might attract audiences, Maleficent would not gross even as much as Oz the Great and Powerful, explaining that the film was released on the same time frame with competitive releases such as X-Men: Days of Future Past, Godzilla, and A Million Ways to Die in the West, though it outperformed those films later on. Boxoffice wrote that Maleficent had a successful marketing campaign, featured Jolie in the title role, and its "female-driven" themes and plot aimed at women. However, the site also noted that the film would have to compete with other summer releases, and the character of Maleficent may not attract young children. Todd Cunningham of The Wrap shared the same opinion, writing, "[the film's] connecting with parents and that Jolie's considerable star power is having a big impact." Wells Fargo's Marci Ryvicker predicted that Maleficent might be "too dark and scary to be profitable" and was likely to force Disney "into a write-down", as reported by The New York Times; while RBC Capital Markets' David Bank commented that "It's definitely in the 'not a sure thing' bucket." Wall St. Cheat Sheet explained that the film approached to a more "grown-up" and "sinister" aspect of the classic, and targeted for an older audience like young adults. "It's just too scary for younger children," the site wrote. ScreenRant added that the PG rating of the film would "fill a void in the marketplace, which is currently without a traditional "family friendly" option." Box Office Mojo primarily compared the film with 2012's Snow White and the Huntsman (another film that also focused on a fairy tale villain), predicting that Maleficent "has a good chance" of matching Snow White's gross in North America box office. The film, however, ended up grossing double the amount projected.

Variety wrote that the film's opening weekend outperforming initial box-office projections was later attributed by analysts in part to Disney's successful marketing to the "potent demographic" (female audiences) much like the studio accomplished with Frozen, in which both films feature a strong female lead. Disney argued that a lack of family-friendly options in the marketplace would "bode well for Maleficent's [box-office] performance" in its two first weeks of release.

The cost of the film was offset by a rebate from the UK in the amount of £23,535,108 ($37 million in 2012, the period in which it was shot).

=== Home media ===
Maleficent was released by Walt Disney Studios Home Entertainment on Blu-ray, DVD, Blu-ray 3D, and digital download on November 4, 2014. The film topped the home-video sales chart in its first week of release. As of February 2015, Maleficent has made over $74 million in total home-video sales. It was the seventh best-selling title of 2014 with 3.6 million units sold. Maleficent was released on 4K UHD Blu-ray on September 24, 2019.

== Reception ==
=== Box office ===
Maleficent earned a gross of $241.4 million in the US and Canada, and $517.1 million in other countries, for a worldwide total of $758.5 million against a budget of $180 million. Calculating in all expenses, Deadline Hollywood estimated that the film made a profit of $190.77 million, making it the sixth most profitable film of 2014. Worldwide, in its opening weekend, the film earned $175.5 million, $9 million of which were from IMAX locations. It is also the biggest debut among films starring Angelina Jolie, and the actress' highest-grossing film of all time worldwide, as well as the fourth-highest grossing 2014 film (behind Transformers: Age of Extinction, The Hobbit: The Battle of the Five Armies, and Guardians of the Galaxy), and the 15th Disney-distributed film to surpass the $700 million mark at the worldwide box office. The film is also one of four Walt Disney Studios releases in 2014 to gross over $500 million; the other titles being Guardians of the Galaxy, Captain America: The Winter Soldier, and Big Hero 6.

In North America, Maleficent earned $4.2 million in Thursday-night showings, surpassing the midnight or late-night grosses of previous live-action fantasy films, Alice in Wonderland, Oz the Great and Powerful and Snow White and the Huntsman. By the end of its opening day (including late-night Thursday earnings), the film earned $24.3 million, similar to Oz, but ahead of Snow White and the Huntsman and behind Alice. Maleficent finished its debut weekend at first place with $69.4 million ($6.7 million of which was earned from IMAX locations and 35% of which was earned from 3D showings), which exceeded Disney's expectations of a $60 million and making it the largest opening-weekend performance for a live-action film starring Jolie (a record previously held by her 2008 film Wanted), as well as the third-highest opening weekend for a solo female star (behind the first two films in The Hunger Games series). Disney reported that 46% of ticket buyers in Thursday previews were male, while weekend reports said family audiences accounted for 45% of the film's total audience, and couples and teens accounted for 38% and 18%, respectively. Female audiences and moviegoers over 25 years old held respective proportions of 60% and 51%. Dave Hollis, head of Walt Disney Studios Motion Pictures, attributed this success to "some momentum and great word-of-mouth." During its first week, the film earned $93.8 million, ahead of Snow White yet behind Oz and Alice. In its second weekend, Maleficent dropped by 50.6% to $34.3 million, finishing in second place. It experienced a smaller second-weekend drop than Snow White, yet still bigger than Oz and Alice. In North America, Maleficent is the eighth-highest-grossing 2014 film.

Maleficent opened outside North America on the same weekend as North America, earning $20.1 million from 35 territories in its first two days (May 28–29, 2014). During its opening weekend, the film topped the box office with $106.1 million from 47 territories. Its largest opening weekends were in China ($22.2 million), Mexico ($14.0 million), and Russia and the CIS ($13.0 million). On the second weekend of release, Maleficent fell to $61.7 million, earning from 52 markets. It was in first place at the box office outside North America on three weekends, its first, third ($39.2 million) and fourth ($47.9 million).

Maleficent is the fourth-highest grossing 2014 film, and Angelina Jolie's highest-grossing live-action film. In total earnings, the film's top markets after North America are Japan ($57.6 million), China ($47.7 million), Mexico ($46.2 million), Russia ($37.7 million), Brazil ($33.2 million), the United Kingdom ($31.7 million), Venezuela ($24.5 million), and Italy ($19.1 million). It was also the most watched film at the Maltese box office in 2014, enjoying an eighteen-week run.

=== Critical response ===
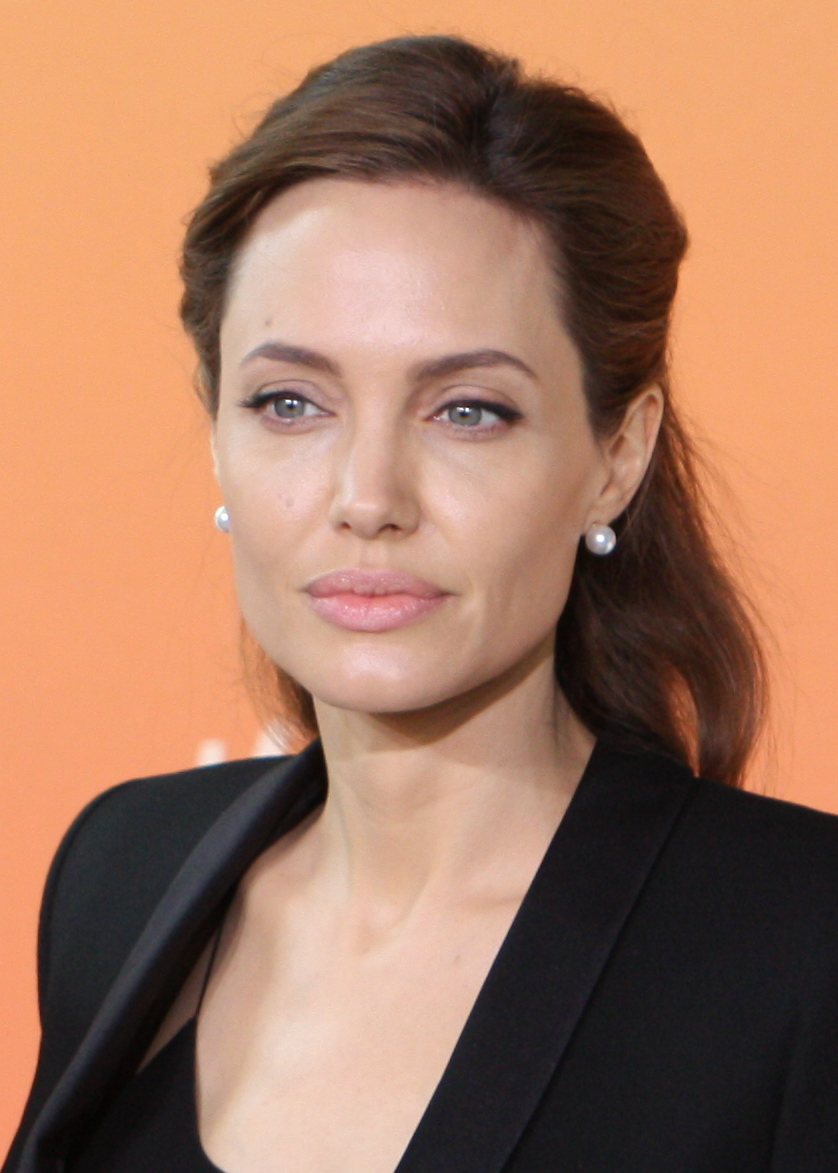
Angelina Jolie's performance was repeatedly acclaimed by critics.

Maleficent received mixed reviews from critics, who praised the performances (especially Jolie's), visual effects and costumes, but criticized the script and Stromberg's direction. The review aggregator website Rotten Tomatoes reported that the film had a 54% approval rating based on 277 reviews, with an average rating of 5.7/10. According to its consensus, "Angelina Jolie's magnetic performance outshines Maleficent's dazzling special effects; unfortunately, the movie around them fails to justify all that impressive effort." On Metacritic, the film has a weighted average score of 56 out of 100 based on 44 critics, indicating "mixed or average reviews". Audiences polled by CinemaScore gave the film an "A" grade on a scale of A+ to F.

The New York Times stated, "with two shorn wings and an astonishing maternal kiss, Maleficent demolishes stereotypes that were only tweaked in Frozen." Kate Taylor of the Globe and Mail was very positive about the film, writing that "[it] surprises not for its baroque visions of a colourful woodland enlivened by joyous fairies and a forbidding castle peopled by unhappy humans, but rather for the thematic richness of its story gloriously personified by Angelina Jolie in the title role." While criticizing the overuse of CGI and 3D effects, she particularly praised the positive message of the film and Jolie's performance. She concluded her review with, "Long live the feminist revisionist backstory." On the contrary, Keith Staskiewicz, writing for the Entertainment Weekly, awarded the film a "B−" and wrote that "there's a lot of levitating cliffs and odd flora. But despite their bleeding-edge digital design, the backgrounds have all the depth of the old matte-painted backgrounds of the analog days," which made the film "[feel] classical in nature." He further commented that "The characters are boiled down to their essentials, the humor is timelessly broad." Michael Philips of the Chicago Tribune gave the film two and a half stars, commenting that the recent "formula" that "a new angle on a well-known fairy tale appears in the light" "works" with Maleficent. He also said that the film "is all about second thoughts" since Maleficent "spends much of the film as Aurora's conflicted fairy godmother." Phillips particularly praised Jolie and Elle Fanning's acting, Rick Baker's makeup (for Jolie's "angular, serrated look"), but criticized James Newton Howard's "sloshy, pushy" musical score. Robbie Collin of The Daily Telegraph wrote, "This Disney reimagining of Sleeping Beauty lacks true enchantment, but Angelina Jolie saves the day." Betsy Sharkey of the Los Angeles Times wrote, "This is Jolie's film because of the Maleficent she makes. Everyone else, even Aurora, fades in her presence." J.C. Maçek III of PopMatters wrote, "Even at its silliest, Maleficent is a well-acted film, with Sharlto Copley turning in a memorable performance and Elle Fanning proving to be an inspired choice for Aurora/Sleeping Beauty. Jolie manages to steal her own show in most every scene. Jolie is excellent as the hopeful fairy, enjoying the world she flies through. She is also brilliant as the Dark Lady, who could be a perfect counterpart to any Darth Vader, as she malevolently takes her revenge on those who have wronged her."

Ann Hornaday of The Washington Post awarded the film three-and-a-half out of four stars, commenting, "Still, for all its limitations, Maleficent manages to be improbably entertaining to watch, due solely to its title character." Writing for Roger Ebert's website, Matt Zoller Seitz awarded Maleficent three out of four stars, praising the themes of the film and the acting of Jolie. Seitz also called the scene in which Maleficent discovers the loss of her wings "the most traumatizing image I've seen in a Hollywood fairy tale since the Christ-like sacrifice of Aslan in 2005's The Chronicles of Narnia: The Lion, the Witch and the Wardrobe." The review in The Globe and Mail further explained that "in the simple context of a fairy tale, Jolie does make both the terrifying horned creature and her gradual awakening heartfelt," extolling the "emotional richness" behind her physical acts. Richard Roeper of the Chicago Sun-Times felt more negatively, assigning it a D. Although Roeper praised the visuals, he criticized the acting and writing, stating that "the story itself might well put you into the same type of coma that befalls the heroine."

Mary Costa, who voiced Aurora in the 1959 animated motion picture, called the film, "a very good movie". She added that "the concept and perspective are totally different than the original film's, which makes it new and interesting." As for Jolie's performance, she said, "No one could have played the part of Maleficent better," concluding that "she was absolutely magnificent!"

=== Rape allegory ===
Multiple reviewers and commentators have opined that an early scene in the movie, in which Stefan drugs Maleficent and removes her wings from her unconscious body, is a metaphor for rape. Hayley Krischer of The Huffington Post interpreted the scene as an important reference to rape culture: "This is the horrific side of rape culture. We're so enmeshed in it that it's impossible to ignore a metaphoric rape that occurs in a Disney movie". She went on to praise the film for giving a positive and hopeful message to rape victims, ultimately allowing "the woman to recover. It gives her agency. It gives her power. It allows her to reclaim the story".

Monika Bartyzel of The Week noted the scene's implications in her review: "In its first act, Maleficent offers a dark, surprisingly adult exploration of rape and female mutilation". However, Bartyzel went on to opine that the film portrayed Maleficent's actions as "a rape revenge fantasy" and criticized the film for not following through on its early subtext, ultimately calling it less feminist and reductive compared to its 1959 counterpart: "In Maleficent, Aurora is the product of a cold and loveless marriage and a vengeful, unhinged rapist. Her safety relies on a trio of clueless and dangerously careless fairies, and her Godmother is the woman who cursed her – and who had, in turn, been violated by her own father".

Angelina Jolie addressed the issue during an interview with BBC Radio 4 on the Woman's Hour programme, claiming that the subtext was intentional: "The question was asked: 'What could make a woman become so dark and lose all sense of her maternity, her womanhood, and her softness?' … We were very conscious, the writer and I, that [the scene] was a metaphor for rape". She further explained that the answer to the question "What could bring her back?" was still "an extreme Disney, fun version [of the story]", but "at the core it is abuse, and how the abused then have a choice of abusing others or overcoming and remaining loving, open people".

=== Accolades ===
Award	Category	Recipient(s)	Result
Academy Awards	Best Costume Design	Anna B. Sheppard	Nominated
Broadcast Film Critics Association	Best Costume Design	Anna B. Sheppard	Nominated
Broadcast Film Critics Association	Best Hair & Makeup		Nominated
Heartland Film Festival	Truly Moving Picture Award	Robert Stromberg	Won
Hollywood Film Awards	Hollywood Production Design	Dylan Cole and Gary Freeman	Won
Hollywood Music in Media Awards	Original Score - SI-FI/Fantasy Film	James Newton Howard	Nominated
Nickelodeon Mexico Kids' Choice Awards	Favorite Movie	Maleficent	Nominated
People's Choice Awards	Favorite Movie	Maleficent	Won
People's Choice Awards	Favorite Family Movie	Maleficent	Won
People's Choice Awards	Favorite Movie Actress	Angelina Jolie	Nominated
People's Choice Awards	Favorite Action Movie Actress	Angelina Jolie	Nominated
Phoenix Film Critics Society	Best Live Action Family Film	Maleficent	Nominated
Phoenix Film Critics Society	Best Costume Design	Anna B. Sheppard	Nominated
Satellite Awards	Best Costume Design	Anna B. Sheppard	Nominated
Satellite Awards	Best Art Direction & Production Design	Dylan Cole, Frank Walsh, Gary Freeman	Nominated
Teen Choice Awards	Choice Movie: Action	Maleficent	Nominated
Teen Choice Awards	Choice Movie Actress: Action	Angelina Jolie	Nominated
Teen Choice Awards	Choice Movie Actress: Action	Elle Fanning	Nominated
45th Annual British Academy Children's Awards	BAFTA Kid's Vote - Film in 2014	Maleficent	Nominated
45th Annual British Academy Children's Awards	Children's Feature Film	Maleficent	Nominated
Saturn Award	Best Fantasy Film	Maleficent	Nominated
Saturn Award	Best Actress	Angelina Jolie	Nominated
Saturn Award	Best Performance by a Younger Actor	Elle Fanning	Nominated
Saturn Award	Best Costume	Anna B. Sheppard	Nominated
Kids' Choice Award	Favorite Movie	Maleficent	Nominated
Kids' Choice Award	Favorite Actress	Angelina Jolie	Nominated
Kids' Choice Award	Favorite Villain	Angelina Jolie	Won
Kids' Choice Award	Favorite Actress	Elle Fanning	Nominated
Visual Effects Society Awards (VES Awards)	Outstanding Visual Effects in a Visual Effects-Driven Photoreal/Live Action Feature Motion Picture	Carey Villegas, Barrie Hemsley, Adam Valdez, Kelly Port, Michael Dawson	Nominated
Visual Effects Society Awards (VES Awards)	Outstanding Performance of an Animated Character in a Photoreal/Live Action Feature Motion Picture	Darren Hendler, Matthias Wittmann, Jeremy Buttell, Elliot Rosenstein	Nominated
Hollywood Post Alliance Awards (HPA Awards)	Outstanding Visual Effects – Feature Film	Carey Villegas, Adam Valdez, Seth Maury, Kevin Hahn, David Seager // MPC	Nominated

== Sequel ==
On June 3, 2014, Angelina Jolie hinted about the possibility of a sequel. On June 15, 2015, Disney announced the sequel with Linda Woolverton returning to write the screenplay and Joe Roth to produce the film. On April 26, 2016, it was confirmed that Jolie would reprise her role as Maleficent. On August 30, 2017, Disney hired screenwriter Jez Butterworth to rewrite the initial script by Woolverton. On October 3, 2017, it was reported that Joachim Rønning (Pirates of the Caribbean: Dead Men Tell No Tales) was in talks on directing the sequel.

In January 2018, the sequel was reported to start filming in spring 2018, and that Patrick Tatopoulos had joined the crew as production designer. In April 2018, Ed Skrein was announced to play the film's villain, with Elle Fanning was set to reprise her role as Aurora.

On April 27, 2018, it was reported that Michelle Pfeiffer was in advanced talks to play a queen in the sequel, while the script's most recent draft was written by Noah Harpster and Micah Fitzerman-Blue. On May 2, 2018, it was reported that Harris Dickinson had joined the cast as Prince Philip, replacing Brenton Thwaites, who was unable to reprise the role due to scheduling conflicts. On May 4, 2018, it was announced that Chiwetel Ejiofor (who previously worked with Jolie in Salt) was in talks to join the cast of the sequel as a potential love interest to Maleficent. On May 17, 2018, Jenn Murray was announced to join the cast.

On May 23, 2018, David Gyasi was reported as joining the cast in an unspecified role. On May 29, the movie officially started filming as the cast and synopsis were revealed.

Principal photography concluded on August 24, 2018. The film was released on October 18, 2019.

== See also ==
- Sleeping Beauty (1959)
- Wicked

== Bibliography ==
- Solomon, Charles (2014). Once Upon a Dream: From Perrault's Sleeping Beauty to Disney's Maleficent. Disney Editions. ISBN 978-1-4231-9902-1.
