= True love's kiss =

Concept used in fairy tales

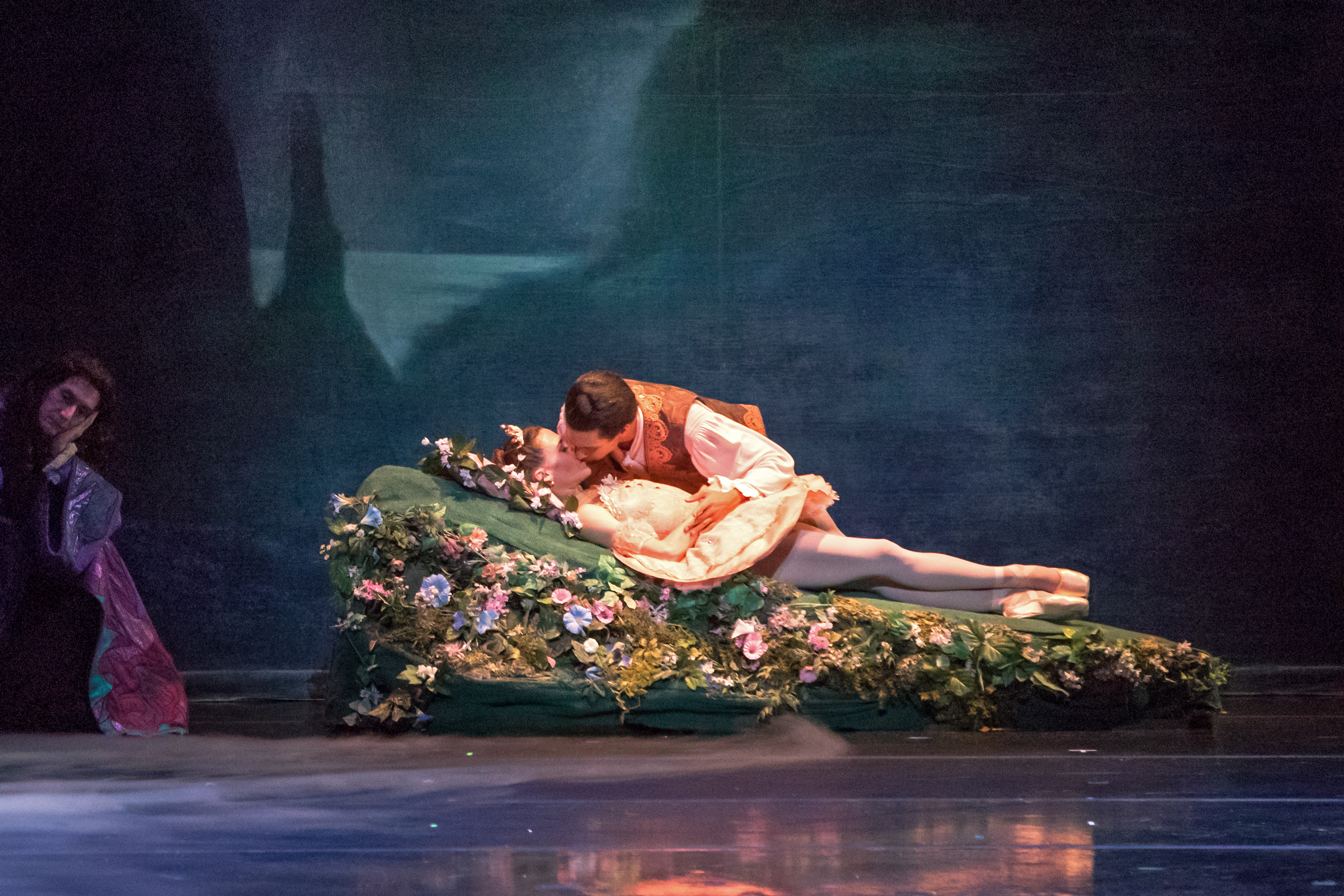
"True love's kiss" in the ballet Sleeping Beauty

In fairy tales, a true love's kiss is a motif and commonly used trope where by a kiss from a romance possesses magical powers and holds significant importance.

== History ==
The phrase "true love's kiss" in storytelling is recorded as early as the 16th century: in William Shakespeare's Richard III, act 4, scene 4, the title character uses the phrase "Bear her my true love's kiss".

In 1812, Children's and Household Tales, written by the Brothers Grimm, included the concept of a magical true love's kiss from the prince to awaken the princess from her 100-year slumber in their adaptation of "Sleeping Beauty", "Dornröschen" ("Little Briar Rose"). The fairy tale was already present in Mother Goose Tales, written by Charles Perrault in 1697, but in his version the princess woke up on her own when the prince knelt before her.

Another early example of true love's kiss can be found in the Grimms' "The True Bride" (Die wahre Braut), in which the heroine breaks the spell over her prince (an evil princess bewitched him to forget her) with true love's kiss.

== In fiction ==
The concept of 'true love's kiss' appears frequently in contemporary fairytale fantasy, including in various modern retellings of fairytales by Walt Disney Pictures.

- In many contemporary adaptations of the tale of "Snow White", starting with the 1937 Disney animated film, Snow White's curse of eternal sleep is broken by the prince's kiss.
- In contemporary adaptations of the fairy tale of "Sleeping Beauty", including the 1959 Disney animated film, the princess's deep sleep is broken by the prince's kiss. In the 2014 retelling in Maleficent, Aurora is revived by a kiss from Maleficent on the forehead, an indicator of her maternal love for her.
- In contemporary retellings of the fairy tale of "The Frog Prince", the frog's transformation to a prince is triggered by a princess kissing the frog.
- In 1989 Disney animated film, Ariel must obtain true love's kiss from Prince Eric to remain human and break the spell cast by Ursula the Sea Witch.
- In contemporary adaptations of the fairy tale of "La Belle et la Bête", including the Disney animated film, the curse of the beast and his household is broken by the true love's kiss of Belle.
- In the Shrek franchise, true love's kiss plays an integral role in the story plots, and has the power to break curses and spells, restore Shrek and Princess Fiona to ogre and human form, and reverse alternate realities.
- In the 2007 film, Enchanted, true love's kiss possesses the only magic powerful enough to break the poisoned apple's curse. One of the songs in the film's soundtrack is also titled "True Love's Kiss".
- In the 2013 book series The School for Good and Evil and subsequent film adaptation, the concept of true love's kiss plays a role in the story as a central riddle, powerful plot device, and as a method to revive the dead.
- In the 2018 film Charming, Lenore brings Prince Charming back to life with true love's kiss.
- In the Once Upon a Time series, true love's kiss is a frequent motif throughout the storyline. For example, Zelena shares true love's kiss with Hades, and Dorothy Gale share's true love's kiss with Red.

In the otome game Love and Deepspace, the "True Love's Kiss" motif is integrated uniquely into the narrative arcs of the male lead, Sylus, showcasing both dramatic and classic romantic executions of the fairytale trope:

- In his companion Myth storyline card, "Beyond Cloudfall," the protagonist (MC) discovers Sylus near death and trapped in a feral dragon form inside a ruined chapel. After singing a soft requiem to restore his awareness, the MC shares an emotionally intense kiss with the dying dragon. This serves as a literal execution of "True Love's Kiss," acting as the catalyst that saves his life and safely reverts him back into his human form.
- In his limited memory card, "Kitten Included," the trope is played straight within a romantic comedy setting, featuring the kiss happening twice within the narrative. When the MC is temporarily transformed into a kitten due to an experimental gene injection, Sylus teases her with fairytale references. The storyline culminates with Sylus kissing her twice, where the final intimate gesture acts as a literal "True Love's Kiss" that successfully breaks the curse and restores her to her human form.
